= United Arab Emirates national football team results (2000–2009) =

This article provides details of international football games played by the United Arab Emirates national football team from 2000 to 2009.

== Results ==
Key
Win
Draw
Defeat

=== 2000 ===
19 February 2000 Oman Cup	Slovenia	1–1	United Arab Emirates	Muscat, Oman
??:?? UTC+4	Udovič 83'	Report	Ali 87'	Stadium: Sultan Qaboos Sports Complex

21 February 2000 Oman Cup	Oman	0–1	United Arab Emirates	Muscat, Oman
??:?? UTC+4		Report	Ali 51'	Stadium: Sultan Qaboos Sports Complex

23 February 2000 Oman Cup	Switzerland	0–1	United Arab Emirates	Muscat, Oman
??:?? UTC+4		Report	Alo Ali 86'	Stadium: Sultan Qaboos Sports Complex

16 August 2000 Friendly	Japan	3–1	United Arab Emirates	Hiroshima, Japan
??:?? UTC+9	Morishima 11'; Nakamura 27'; Oku 87'	Report	Saeed 90'	Stadium: Edion Stadium Hiroshima

7 September 2000 Friendly	Lebanon	0–1	United Arab Emirates	Khiara, Lebanon
??:?? UTC+3		Report	Al Balooshi 48'	Stadium: Jamal Abdel Nasser Stadium

10 September 2000 Friendly	Lebanon	2–2	United Arab Emirates	Beirut, Lebanon
??:?? UTC+3	Newton 45'; Zein 45+2'	Report	Goal	Stadium: Camille Chamoun Sports City Stadium

28 September 2000 Friendly	Saudi Arabia	6–1	United Arab Emirates	Riyadh, Saudi Arabia
18:30 UTC+3	Idris 31', 42'; Al-Temyat 35'; Zubromawi 38'; Al-Dosari 53'; Al-Meshal 77'	Report	Al Kass 74'	Stadium: Prince Faisal bin Fahd Stadium; Referee: Abdulhameed Ebrahim (Bahrain)

4 October 2000 2000 LG Cup	United Arab Emirates	1–1 (3–2 p)	South Korea	Dubai, United Arab Emirates
??:?? UTC+4	Ali 34'	Report	Young-pyo 89'	Stadium: Al Maktoum Stadium
	Penalties
	Saeed (penalty scored); Khater (penalty scored); Abdulrehman (penalty scored)		Dong-gook (penalty scored); Young-pyo (penalty scored)

7 October 2000 2000 LG Cup	United Arab Emirates	1–0	Kuwait	Dubai, United Arab Emirates
??:?? UTC+4	Al Balooshi 88'	Report		Stadium: Al Maktoum Stadium

12 November 2000 Friendly	United Arab Emirates	1–1	Hong Kong	Abu Dhabi, United Arab Emirates
??:?? UTC+4	Ali (?)	Report	Chi Yeung (?)	Stadium: Zayed Sports City Stadium

11 December 2000 Friendly	United Arab Emirates	5–2	Kazakhstan	Abu Dhabi, United Arab Emirates
??:?? UTC+4	Goal	Report	Baltiyev 11', 76' (pen.)	Stadium: Zayed Sports City Stadium

=== 2001 ===
6 January 2001 Friendly	Egypt	2–1	United Arab Emirates	Cairo, Egypt
19:00 UTC+2	Mido 50'; Hassan 77'	Report	Jumaa 31' (pen.)	Stadium: Cairo International Stadium; Referee: Gamal Al-Ghandour (Egypt)

11 February 2001 Friendly	United Arab Emirates	1–4	South Korea	Dubai, United Arab Emirates
??:?? UTC+4	Jumaa 24'	Report	Chong-gug 45'; Sang-chul 65'; Ki-hyeon 72'; Jong-soo 89'	Stadium: Maktoum Bin Rashid Al Maktoum Stadium

27 March 2001 Friendly	Oman	2–1	United Arab Emirates	Muscat, Oman
??:?? UTC+4	Khamis 1'; Al-Dhabit (?)	Report	Masoud (?)

2 April 2001 2002 FIFA World Cup qualification	United Arab Emirates	6–0	Sri Lanka	Al Ain, United Arab Emirates
16:00 UTC+4	Ali (?); Al Shamsi (?); Omar (?); Ibrahim (?)	Report		Stadium: Khalifa bin Zayed Stadium

8 April 2001 2002 FIFA World Cup qualification	India	1–0	United Arab Emirates	Bangalore, India
16:00 UTC+5:30	Alberto 71'	Report		Stadium: Bangalore Football Stadium; Attendance: 12,000; Referee: Sun Baojie (China)

14 April 2001 2002 FIFA World Cup qualification	Brunei	0–12	United Arab Emirates	Bandar Seri Begawan, Brunei
20:15 UTC+7		Report	Ali 1', 58', 67', 75', 81'; Omar 12', 45'; Hussain 27'; Khater 38'; Jumaa 49'; Momin 50' (o.g.); Masoud 90'	Stadium: Hassanal Bolkiah National Stadium; Attendance: 1,000; Referee: Fong Yau Fat Jame (Hong Kong)

26 April 2001 2002 FIFA World Cup qualification	United Arab Emirates	1–0	India	Al Ain, United Arab Emirates
19:30 UTC+4	Khater 63'	Report		Stadium: Khalifa bin Zayed Stadium; Attendance: 12,000; Referee: Halim Abdul Hamid (Malaysia)

4 May 2001 2002 FIFA World Cup qualification	United Arab Emirates	4–0	Brunei	Al Ain, United Arab Emirates
19:30 UTC+4	Ali 20', 50'; Al Kass 70'; Khalil 86'	Report		Stadium: Khalifa bin Zayed Stadium; Attendance: 7,000; Referee: Menfi Redha Falah (Iraq)

11 May 2001 2002 FIFA World Cup qualification	Yemen	2–1	United Arab Emirates	Sanaa, Yemen
16:00 UTC+3	Al Ghurbani 52'; Al-Nono 73'	Report	Al Kass 44'	Stadium: Althawra Sports City Stadium; Attendance: 17,000; Referee: Mohammad Mansour (Lebanon)

18 May 2001 2002 FIFA World Cup qualification	United Arab Emirates	3–2	Yemen	Al Ain, United Arab Emirates
19:30 UTC+4	Al Kass 37', 40'; Ali 45'	Report	Al-Nono 39'; Al-Salimi 61'	Stadium: Khalifa bin Zayed Stadium; Attendance: 20,000; Referee: Qasem Shaban (Kuwait)

2 August 2001 Friendly	United Arab Emirates	2–2	Iraq	Abu Dhabi, United Arab Emirates
19:30 UTC+4	Jumaa 67'; Ali 78'	Report	H. Mohammed 44'; E. Mohammed 57'	Stadium: Al Nahyan Stadium

8 August 2001 Friendly	United Arab Emirates	0–1	Saudi Arabia	Abu Dhabi, United Arab Emirates
19:30 UTC+4	Al-Shahrani 28'	Report		Stadium: Al Nahyan Stadium; Referee: Ali Mandani (Kuwait)

17 August 2001 2002 FIFA World Cup qualification	United Arab Emirates	4–1	Uzbekistan	Abu Dhabi, United Arab Emirates
19:30 UTC+4	Ali 21'; Hareb 33' (pen.); Ali 45'; Bakheet 85'	Report		Stadium: Zayed Sports City Stadium; Attendance: 15,000; Referee: Kim Young-joo (South Korea)

25 August 2001 2002 FIFA World Cup qualification	China	3–0	United Arab Emirates	Shenyang, China
19:30 UTC+8	Xiaopeng 2'; Hong 19'; Haidong 33'	Report		Stadium: Wulihe Stadium; Attendance: 46,000; Referee: Mongkol Rungklay (Thailand)

31 August 2001 2002 FIFA World Cup qualification	United Arab Emirates	0–2	Qatar	Abu Dhabi, United Arab Emirates
19:15 UTC+4		Report	Hashim 65'; Al-Obaidly 71'	Stadium: Zayed Sports City Stadium; Attendance: 20,000; Referee: Abdulrahman Al Zaid (Saudi Arabia)

7 September 2001 Friendly	Saudi Arabia	0–2	United Arab Emirates	Dammam, Saudi Arabia
18:00 UTC+3		Report	Al Anberi 75'; Al Kalbani 89'	Stadium: Prince Mohamed bin Fahd Stadium; Referee: Abdulaziz Al Dokhail (Saudi Arabia)

14 September 2001 2002 FIFA World Cup qualification	Oman	1–1	United Arab Emirates	Muscat, Oman
19:00 UTC+4	Nairooz 52'	Report	Abdulazeez 13'	Stadium: Sultan Qaboos Sports Complex; Attendance: 3,000; Referee: Hassan Marshoud (Jordan)

22 September 2001 2002 FIFA World Cup qualification	Uzbekistan	0–1	United Arab Emirates	Tashkent, Uzbekistan
19:00 UTC+5		Report	Omar 43'	Stadium: Pakhtakor Central Stadium; Attendance: 42,000; Referee: Masayoshi Okada (Japan)

27 September 2001 2002 FIFA World Cup qualification	United Arab Emirates	0–1	China	Abu Dhabi, United Arab Emirates
18:45 UTC+4		Report	Hong 43'	Stadium: Zayed Sports City Stadium; Attendance: 15,000; Referee: Peter Prendergast (Jamaica)

4 October 2001 2002 FIFA World Cup qualification	Qatar	1–2	United Arab Emirates	Doha, Qatar
19:00 UTC+3	Hamzah 47'	Report	Khalil 43'; Ali 84'	Stadium: Khalifa International Stadium; Attendance: 8,000; Referee: Abdulaziz Al Dokhail (Saudi Arabia)

19 October 2001 2002 FIFA World Cup qualification	United Arab Emirates	2–2	Oman	Abu Dhabi, United Arab Emirates
18:30 UTC+4	Ibrahim 45'; Omar 60'	Report	Al-Siyabi 22'; Al-Dhabit 41'	Stadium: Zayed Sports City Stadium; Attendance: 40,000; Referee: Ali Abdulla Mandani (Kuwait)

25 October 2001 2002 FIFA World Cup qualification	Iran	1–0	United Arab Emirates	Tehran, Iran
17:00 UTC+4:30	Bagheri 45'	Report		Stadium: Azadi Stadium; Attendance: 40,000; Referee: Kim Young-joo (South Korea)

31 October 2001 2002 FIFA World Cup qualification	United Arab Emirates	0–3	Iran	Abu Dhabi, United Arab Emirates
18:30 UTC+4		Report	Daei 7'; Bagheri 76'; Minavand 79'	Stadium: Al Nahyan Stadium; Attendance: 18,000; Referee: Toru Kamikawa (Japan)

=== 2002 ===
17 January 2002 2002 Gulf Cup	United Arab Emirates	1–0	Oman	Riyadh, Saudi Arabia
20:00 UTC+3	Alo Ali 12'	Report		Stadium: King Fahd Sports City

20 January 2002 2002 Gulf Cup	United Arab Emirates	0–2	Qatar	Riyadh, Saudi Arabia
20:00 UTC+3	Ibrahim 78'	Report	Al-Kuwari 35'; Nazmi 83'	Stadium: King Fahd Sports City

24 January 2002 2002 Gulf Cup	Saudi Arabia	1–0	United Arab Emirates	Riyadh, Saudi Arabia
20:00 UTC+3	Al-Dosari 3'	Report		Stadium: King Fahd Sports City

27 January 2002 2002 Gulf Cup	United Arab Emirates	1–2	Bahrain	Riyadh, Saudi Arabia
20:00 UTC+3	Ibrahim 78'	Report	Ali 31'; Isa 90'	Stadium: King Fahd Sports City

29 January 2002 2002 Gulf Cup	Kuwait	2–1	United Arab Emirates	Riyadh, Saudi Arabia
20:00 UTC+3	Al-Huwaidi 31', 39'	Report	Jumaa 65'	Stadium: King Fahd Sports City

25 September 2002 Friendly	Oman	2–1	United Arab Emirates	Muscat, Oman
??:?? UTC+4	Goal	Report	Goal

16 December 2002 Friendly	United Arab Emirates	1–2	Egypt	Abu Dhabi, United Arab Emirates
19:00 UTC+4	Ali 50'	Report	Hafeez 6'; Belal 90+3'	Stadium: Mohammed bin Zayed Stadium

=== 2003 ===
26 January 2003 Friendly	United Arab Emirates	1–1	Norway	Sharjah, United Arab Emirates
22:00 UTC+4	Srour 63'	Report	Helstad 72'	Stadium: Sharjah Stadium

26 September 2003 Friendly	United Arab Emirates	1–4	Bahrain	Al Ain, United Arab Emirates
??:?? UTC+4	Khalil 61'	Report	Jalal 18'; Salman 49'; Yousef 57'; Jamal 90'	Stadium: Tahnoun bin Mohammed Stadium

11 October 2003 Friendly	United Arab Emirates	2–2	Uzbekistan	Dubai, United Arab Emirates
20:00 UTC+4	Khalil 24'; Mubarak 49'	Report	Karpenko 40'; Djeparov 86'	Stadium: Maktoum bin Rashid Al Maktoum Stadium

19 October 2003 2004 Asian Cup qualification	Turkmenistan	1–0	United Arab Emirates	Ashgabat, Turkmenistan
??:?? UTC+5	Baýramow 43'	Report		Stadium: Saparmurat Turkmenbashy Olympic Stadium

30 October 2003 2004 Asian Cup qualification	United Arab Emirates	1–1	Turkmenistan	Sharjah, United Arab Emirates
??:?? UTC+4	Matar 58'	Report	Baýramow 41'	Stadium: Sharjah Stadium

7 November 2003 2004 Asian Cup qualification	Syria	1–3	United Arab Emirates	Damascus, Syria
??:?? UTC+3	Al-Khatib 50'	Report	Yaslam 74'; Srour 80'; Jumaa 89'	Stadium: Abbasiyyin Stadium

14 November 2003 2004 Asian Cup qualification	United Arab Emirates	3–1	Syria	Sharjah, United Arab Emirates
??:?? UTC+4	Yaslam 45'; Omar 63'; Rashed 78'	Report	Rafe 36'	Stadium: Sharjah Stadium

18 November 2003 2004 Asian Cup qualification	United Arab Emirates	3–1	Sri Lanka	Dubai, United Arab Emirates
??:?? UTC+4	Omar 11' (pen.); Khater 40'; Matar 61'	Report	Channa 31'	Stadium: Maktoum bin Rashid Al Maktoum Stadium

22 November 2003 2004 Asian Cup qualification	Sri Lanka	0–3	United Arab Emirates	Dubai, United Arab Emirates
??:?? UTC+4		Report	Jumaa 45+2', 79'; Omar 87'	Stadium: Maktoum bin Rashid Al Maktoum Stadium

14 December 2003 Friendly	United Arab Emirates	3–3	Azerbaijan	Dubai, United Arab Emirates
??:?? UTC+4	Mubarak 5'; Srour 54'; Omar 72' (pen.)	Report	Nabiyev 26', 90+1'; Karimov 83'	Stadium: Maktoum bin Rashid Al Maktoum Stadium

21 December 2003 Friendly	United Arab Emirates	2–2	Kenya	Abu Dhabi, United Arab Emirates
??:?? UTC+4	Omar 41' (pen.), 46'	Report	Omondi 86'; Juma 90+1'	Stadium: Zayed Sports City Stadium

26 December 2003 2003 Gulf Cup	Saudi Arabia	2–0	United Arab Emirates	Kuwait City, Kuwait
22:00 UTC+3	Al-Shalhoub 15' (pen.); Tukar 83'	Report		Stadium: Al-Sadaqua Walsalam Stadium

29 December 2003 2003 Gulf Cup	Kuwait	0–2	United Arab Emirates	Kuwait City, Kuwait
22:00 UTC+3		Report	Rashed 70'; Srour 77'	Stadium: Al-Sadaqua Walsalam Stadium

31 December 2003 2003 Gulf Cup	United Arab Emirates	0–2	Oman	Kuwait City, Kuwait
22:00 UTC+3		Report	Kano 32'; Saleh 51'	Stadium: Al-Sadaqua Walsalam Stadium

=== 2004 ===
3 January 2004 2003 Gulf Cup	Qatar	0–0	United Arab Emirates	Kuwait City, Kuwait
22:00 UTC+3		Report		Stadium: Al-Sadaqua Walsalam Stadium

7 January 2004 2003 Gulf Cup	Bahrain	3–1	United Arab Emirates	Kuwait City, Kuwait
22:00 UTC+3	Yousef 26', 80'; Farhan 27'	Report	Khalil 6'	Stadium: Al-Sadaqua Walsalam Stadium

11 January 2004 2003 Gulf Cup	United Arab Emirates	3–0	Yemen	Kuwait City, Kuwait
22:00 UTC+3	Omar 5'; Abdulrahman 20'; Srour 86'	Report		Stadium: Al-Sadaqua Walsalam Stadium

18 February 2004 2006 FIFA World Cup qualification	United Arab Emirates	1–0	Thailand	Al Ain, United Arab Emirates
19:15 UTC+4	Srour 22'	Report		Stadium: Khalifa bin Zayed Stadium; Attendance: 4,000; Referee: Sun Baojie (China)

31 March 2004 2006 FIFA World Cup qualification	North Korea	0–0	United Arab Emirates	Pyongyang, North Korea
16:00 UTC+9		Report		Stadium: Kim Il Sung Stadium; Attendance: 20,000; Referee: Zhou Weixin (China)

31 May 2004 Friendly	United Arab Emirates	2–3	Bahrain	Dubai, United Arab Emirates
??:?? UTC+4	Jumaa 70'; Hubail 76' (o.g.)	Report	Isa 40'; Al Mosawi 48'; Ali 74' (pen.)	Stadium: Maktoum bin Rashid Al Maktoum Stadium

9 June 2004 2006 FIFA World Cup qualification	United Arab Emirates	3–0	Yemen	Al Ain, United Arab Emirates
20:00 UTC+4	Abdulrahman 24'; Omar 28', 73'	Report		Stadium: Khalifa bin Zayed Stadium; Attendance: 5,000; Referee: Allabergen Sapaev (Turkmenistan)

10 July 2004 Friendly	China	2–2	United Arab Emirates	Hohhot, China
??:?? UTC+8	Zhi 63', 90+1' (pen.)	Report	Khamis 48'; Ismail Matar 60'	Stadium: Hohhot People's Stadium

19 July 2004 2004 Asian Cup	Kuwait	3–1	United Arab Emirates	Jinan, China
21:00 UTC+8	Abdullah 24'; Al-Mutawa 39' (pen.); Saeed (o.g.)	Report	Srour 47'	Stadium: Shandong Provincial Stadium; Attendance: 31,250; Referee: Naser Al-Hamdan (Saudi Arabia)

23 July 2004 2004 Asian Cup	United Arab Emirates	0–2	South Korea	Jinan, China
21:00 UTC+8		Report	Dong-gook 41'; Jung-hwan 90+1'	Stadium: Shandong Provincial Stadium; Attendance: 30,000; Referee: Ravshan Irmatov (Uzbekistan)

27 July 2004 2004 Asian Cup	Jordan	0–0	United Arab Emirates	Beijing, China
19:00 UTC+8		Report		Stadium: Workers' Stadium; Attendance: 25,000; Referee: Talaat Najm (Lebanon)

8 September 2004 2006 FIFA World Cup qualification	Yemen	3–1	United Arab Emirates	Sanaa, Yemen
16:00 UTC+3	Al-Nono 22', 77'; Abduljabar 49'	Report	Omar 26'	Stadium: Althawra Sports City Stadium; Attendance: 17,000; Referee: Khalil Al Ghamdi (Saudi Arabia)

8 October 2004 Friendly	Singapore	1–2	United Arab Emirates	Kallang, Singapore
??:?? UTC+8	Masturi 58'	Report	Masoud 25'; Khamis 26'	Stadium: Jalan Besar Stadium

13 October 2004 2006 FIFA World Cup qualification	Thailand	3–0	United Arab Emirates	Bangkok, Thailand
19:00 UTC+7	Jakapong 10'; Nanok 30'; Chaiman 67'	Report		Stadium: Rajamangala Stadium; Attendance: 15,000; Referee: Yuichi Nishimura (Japan)

11 November 2004 Friendly	United Arab Emirates	4–0	Jordan	Dubai, United Arab Emirates
??:?? UTC+4	Khalil 43'; Matar 64'; Khater 66', 82'	Report		Stadium: Rashid Stadium

17 November 2004 2006 FIFA World Cup qualification	United Arab Emirates	1–0	North Korea	Dubai, United Arab Emirates
18:30 UTC+4	Obaid 58'	Report		Stadium: Rashid Stadium; Attendance: 2,000; Referee: Halim Abdul Hamid (Malaysia)

22 November 2004 Friendly	United Arab Emirates	2–3	Belarus	Abu Dhabi, United Arab Emirates
18:00 UTC+4	Abdulla 21'; Masoud 75'	Report	Shkabara 44'; Kovel 60'; Kulchy 90+1'	Stadium: Mohammed bin Zayed Stadium

27 November 2004 Friendly	United Arab Emirates	0–1	Kuwait	Abu Dhabi, United Arab Emirates
??:?? UTC+4		Report	Al-Hamad 50'	Stadium: Zayed Sports City Stadium

3 December 2004 Friendly	United Arab Emirates	1–1	Kuwait	Dubai, United Arab Emirates
??:?? UTC+4	Saeed 26'	Report	Al-Hamad 80'	Stadium: Rashid Stadium

10 December 2004 2004 Gulf Cup	Qatar	2–2	United Arab Emirates	Al Rayyan, Qatar
22:00 UTC+3	Jassem 90'; Rizik 90+1'	Report	Khater 42' (pen.); Matar 83'	Stadium: Jassim bin Hamad Stadium

13 December 2004 2004 Gulf Cup	Oman	2–1	United Arab Emirates	Al Rayyan, Qatar
22:00 UTC+3	Al-Gheilani 73'; Al-Maimani 85'	Report	Masoud 46'	Stadium: Jassim bin Hamad Stadium

16 December 2004 2004 Gulf Cup	United Arab Emirates	1–1	Iraq	Al Rayyan, Qatar
22:00 UTC+3	Faisal Khalil 69'	Report	Munir 90+1'	Stadium: Ahmed bin Ali Stadium

=== 2005 ===
9 February 2005 Friendly	United Arab Emirates	1–2	Switzerland	Dubai, United Arab Emirates
19:00 UTC+4	Ismail Matar 21'	Report	Gygax 9'; Müller 79'	Stadium: Maktoum bin Rashid Al Maktoum Stadium

24 May 2005 Kirin Cup	United Arab Emirates	0–0	Peru	Toyota, Japan
21:00 UTC+9		Report		Stadium: Toyota Stadium; Attendance: 6,536; Referee: Ľuboš Micheľ (Slovakia)

27 May 2005 Kirin Cup	Japan	0–1	United Arab Emirates	Tokyo, Japan
21:00 UTC+9		Report	Alo Ali 69'	Stadium: National Stadium; Attendance: 53,123; Referee: Ľuboš Micheľ (Slovakia)

29 July 2005 Arab Tournament	United Arab Emirates	1–1 (7–6 p)	Kuwait	Lancy, Switzerland
??:?? UTC+2		Report		Stadium: Stade de Genève

31 July 2005 Arab Tournament	Egypt	0–0 (5–4 p)	United Arab Emirates	Lancy, Switzerland
??:?? UTC+2		Report		Stadium: Stade de Genève

23 September 2005 Friendly	United Arab Emirates	0–0	Benin	Manama, Bahrain
??:?? UTC+3		Report		Stadium: Al Ahli Stadium

11 October 2005 Friendly	United Arab Emirates	2–2	Oman	Al Rayyan, Qatar
??:?? UTC+3	Matar 21'; Jumaa 68'	Report	Saleh 60', 85'	Stadium: Khalifa International Stadium

12 November 2005 Friendly	United Arab Emirates	0–8	Brazil	Abu Dhabi, United Arab Emirates
21:30 UTC+4		Report	Kaká 20'; Adriano 52'; Lúcio 64'; Pernambucano 70', 79'; Cicinho 90'	Stadium: Zayed Sports City Stadium

16 November 2005 Friendly	Syria	0–3	United Arab Emirates	Damascus, Syria
16:00 UTC+3		Report	Al Kass 22'; Matar 33'; Khalil 88'	Stadium: Abbasiyyin Stadium

2 December 2005 Friendly	United Arab Emirates	1–1	Libya	Sharjah, United Arab Emirates
18:15 UTC+4	Mubarak 55'	Report	Dawood 38'	Stadium: Sharjah Stadium

=== 2006 ===
18 January 2006 Friendly	United Arab Emirates	1–0	South Korea	Dubai, United Arab Emirates
18:30 UTC+4	Khalil 22'	Report		Stadium: Maktoum bin Rashid Al Maktoum Stadium; Referee: Ahmed Hassan Belal (Egypt)

22 February 2006 2007 Asian Cup Qualification	United Arab Emirates	1–0	Oman	Dubai, United Arab Emirates
19:00 UTC+4	Matar 15'	Report		Stadium: Al Maktoum Stadium; Attendance: 10,000; Referee: Khalil Al Ghamdi (Saudi Arabia)

1 March 2006 2007 Asian Cup Qualification	Pakistan	1–4	United Arab Emirates	Karachi, Pakistan
21:00 UTC+5	Essa 60'	Report	Qassim 68'; Matar 78'; Saad 81'; Al Kass 88'	Stadium: People's Football Stadium; Attendance: 10,000; Referee: Satop Tongkhan (Thailand)

2 May 2006 Friendly	United Arab Emirates	2–1	Syria	Dubai, United Arab Emirates
14:00 UTC+4	Mubarak (?); Khalil 90'	Report	Chaabo 2'	Stadium: Maktoum bin Rashid Al Maktoum Stadium

8 August 2006 Friendly	Iran	1–0	United Arab Emirates	Tehran, Iran
18:00 UTC+3:30	Enayati 5'	Report		Stadium: Azadi Stadium; Attendance: 4,000; Referee: Mahmoud Rafiei (Iran)

16 August 2006 2007 Asian Cup Qualification	Jordan	1–2	United Arab Emirates	Amman, Jordan
19:15 UTC+3	Ali 88'	Report	Omar 52'; Khater 67'	Stadium: Amman International Stadium; Attendance: 18,000; Referee: Naser Al Hamdan (Saudi Arabia)

27 August 2006 Friendly	Saudi Arabia	1–0	United Arab Emirates	Jeddah, Saudi Arabia
21:00 UTC+3	Bashir 9'	Report		Stadium: Prince Abdullah Al Faisal Stadium; Referee: Ali Al-Mutlaq (Saudi Arabia)

6 September 2006 2007 Asian Cup Qualification	United Arab Emirates	0–0	Jordan	Dubai, United Arab Emirates
19:15 UTC+4		Report		Stadium: Maktoum bin Rashid Al Maktoum Stadium; Attendance: 9,000; Referee: Saad Al-Fadhli (Kuwait)

11 October 2006 2007 Asian Cup Qualification	Oman	2–1	United Arab Emirates	Muscat, Oman
22:00 UTC+4	Al-Gheilani 24'; Al-Ajmi 28'	Report	Omar 57'	Stadium: Sultan Qaboos Sports Complex; Attendance: 28,000; Referee: Huang Junjie (China)

15 November 2006 2007 Asian Cup Qualification	United Arab Emirates	3–2	Pakistan	Abu Dhabi, United Arab Emirates
18:15 UTC+4	Abbas 54'; Omar 58', 73'	Report	Akram 23'; Ahmed 67'	Stadium: Mohammed bin Zayed Stadium; Attendance: 6,000; Referee: Subrata Sarkar (India)

6 December 2006 Friendly	United Arab Emirates	2–5	Poland	Abu Dhabi, United Arab Emirates
18:00 UTC+4	Khater 26'; Srour 86' (pen.)	Report	Grzelak 8', 50'; Wasilewski 17'; Magdoń 87'	Stadium: Zayed Sports City Stadium; Referee: Abdullah Al Hilali (Oman)

10 December 2006 Friendly	United Arab Emirates	1–2	Slovakia	Abu Dhabi, United Arab Emirates
18:15 UTC+4	Matar 90+1'	Report	Jonáš 50'; Michalík 53'	Stadium: Zayed Sports City Stadium

=== 2007 ===
12 January 2007 Friendly	United Arab Emirates	0–2	Iran	Abu Dhabi, United Arab Emirates
18:30 UTC+4		Report	Khatibi 26' (pen.); Sadeghi 90'	Stadium: Al Nahyan Stadium

17 January 2007 2007 Gulf Cup	United Arab Emirates	1–2	Oman	Abu Dhabi, United Arab Emirates
19:00 UTC+4	Matar 65'	Report	Bashir 36'; Al-Hosni	Stadium: Zayed Sports City Stadium

20 January 2007 2007 Gulf Cup	United Arab Emirates	2–1	Yemen	Abu Dhabi, United Arab Emirates
22:00 UTC+4	Omar 2' (pen.); Saeed 64'	Report	Al-Sasi 90+2'	Stadium: Mohammed bin Zayed Stadium

23 January 2007 2007 Gulf Cup	United Arab Emirates	3–2	Kuwait	Abu Dhabi, United Arab Emirates
22:00 UTC+4	Matar 1', 90+1'; Khalil 33'	Report	Al-Mutawa 31'; Al Fahd 35'	Stadium: Mohammed bin Zayed Stadium

27 January 2007 2007 Gulf Cup	Saudi Arabia	0–1	United Arab Emirates	Abu Dhabi, United Arab Emirates
21:00 UTC+4		Report	Matar 90+1'	Stadium: Zayed Sports City Stadium

30 January 2007 2007 Gulf Cup	Oman	0–1	United Arab Emirates	Abu Dhabi, United Arab Emirates
21:00 UTC+4		Report	Matar 72'	Stadium: Zayed Sports City Stadium

24 June 2007 Friendly	United Arab Emirates	0–2	Saudi Arabia	Kallang, Singapore
14:00 UTC+8		Report	Al-Harthi 49'; Mouath 57'	Stadium: National Stadium

27 June 2007 Friendly	Bahrain	2–2	United Arab Emirates	Petaling Jaya, Malaysia
11:00 UTC+8	Jalal 11'; Okwunwanne 88'	Report	Al-Shehhi 35'; Jaber 49'	Stadium: Petaling Jaya Stadium

1 July 2007 Friendly	United Arab Emirates	1–0	North Korea	Jurong West, Singapore
13:30 UTC+8	Jaber 52'	Report		Stadium: Jurong West Stadium

8 July 2007 2007 Asian Cup	Vietnam	2–0	United Arab Emirates	Hanoi, Vietnam
19:30 UTC+7	Quang Thanh 64'; Công Vinh 73'	Report		Stadium: Mỹ Đình National Stadium; Attendance: 39,450; Referee: Talaat Najm (Thailand)

13 July 2007 2007 Asian Cup	United Arab Emirates	1–3	Japan	Hanoi, Vietnam
20:30 UTC+7	Al Kass 66'	Report	Takahara 22', 27'; Nakamura 42' (pen.)	Stadium: Mỹ Đình National Stadium; Attendance: 5,000; Referee: Satop Tongkhan (Thailand)

16 July 2007 2007 Asian Cup	Qatar	1–2	United Arab Emirates	Ho Chi Minh City, Vietnam
17:15 UTC+7	Soria 42' (pen.)	Report	Al Kass 60'; Khalil 90+4'	Stadium: Quân khu 7 Stadium; Attendance: 3,000; Referee: Masoud Moradi (Iran)

12 September 2007 Friendly	Singapore	1–1	United Arab Emirates	Jurong West, Singapore
15:30 UTC+8	Wilkinson 39'	Report	Khalil 70'	Stadium: Jurong West Stadium

23 September 2007 Friendly	United Arab Emirates	1–1	Lebanon	Dubai, United Arab Emirates
22:00 UTC+4	Abdulrahman 17'	Report	El Ali 18'	Stadium: Maktoum bin Rashid Al Maktoum Stadium

3 October 2007 Friendly	Thailand	1–1	United Arab Emirates	Bangkok, Thailand
17:30 UTC+7	Thonkanya 73'	Report	Mubarak 89'	Stadium: Suphachalasai Stadium

8 October 2007 2010 FIFA World Cup qualification	Vietnam	0–1	United Arab Emirates	Hanoi, Vietnam
20:30 UTC+7		Report	Saeed 79'	Stadium: Mỹ Đình National Stadium; Attendance: 20,000; Referee: Yuichi Nishimura (Japan)

17 October 2007 Friendly	United Arab Emirates	0–1	Tunisia	Abu Dhabi, United Arab Emirates
19:00 UTC+4		Report	Belaïd 29'	Stadium: Zayed Sports City Stadium

28 October 2007 2010 FIFA World Cup qualification	United Arab Emirates	5–0	Vietnam	Abu Dhabi, United Arab Emirates
19:00 UTC+4	Matar 13'; Al Mahri 40'; Al Shehhi 53'; Mubarak 90'; Al Kass 90+4' (pen.)	Report		Stadium: Mohammed bin Zayed Stadium; Attendance: 12,000; Referee: Subkhiddin Salleh (Malaysia)

17 November 2007 Four Nations Tournament	Benin	1–0	United Arab Emirates	Accra, Ghana
15:00 UTC+0	Maïga 46'	Report		Stadium: Accra Sports Stadium

21 November 2007 Four Nations Tournament	United Arab Emirates	0–5	Togo	Accra, Ghana
15:00 UTC+0		Report	Cissé 20'; Fakher 68' (o.g.); Sapol 73'; Dossevi 82'; Adebayor 84'	Stadium: Accra Sports Stadium

=== 2008 ===
10 January 2008 Friendly	United Arab Emirates	0–0	China	Dubai, United Arab Emirates
19:15 UTC+4		Report		Stadium: Maktoum bin Rashid Al Maktoum Stadium

31 January 2008 Friendly	United Arab Emirates	0–1	Iraq	Abu Dhabi, United Arab Emirates
19:15 UTC+4		Report	Mohammed 26'	Stadium: Al Nahyan Stadium

6 February 2008 2010 FIFA world cup qualification	United Arab Emirates	2–0	Kuwait	Abu Dhabi, United Arab Emirates
19:15 UTC+4	Al-Shehhi 5'; Khalil 53'	Report		Stadium: Mohammed bin Zayed Stadium; Attendance: 19,000; Referee: Ravshan Irmatov (Uzbekistan)

19 March 2008 Friendly	Oman	1–1	United Arab Emirates	Muscat, Oman
14:00 UTC+4	Khalfan 5'	Report	Malallah 85'	Stadium: Sultan Qaboos Sports Complex

26 March 2008 2010 FIFA world cup qualification	Syria	1–1	United Arab Emirates	Damascus, Syria
14:30 UTC+2	Chaabo 2'	Report	Matar 54'	Stadium: Abbasiyyin Stadium; Attendance: 35,000; Referee: Sun Baojie (China)

2 June 2008 2010 FIFA world cup qualification	Iran	0–0	United Arab Emirates	Tehran, Iran
19:00 UTC+4:30		Report		Stadium: Azadi Stadium; Attendance: 50,000; Referee: Lee Gi-young (South Korea)

7 June 2008 2010 FIFA world cup qualification	United Arab Emirates	0–1	Iran	Al Ain, United Arab Emirates
20:00 UTC+4		Report	Zandi 8'	Stadium: Khalifa bin Zayed Stadium; Attendance: 9,000; Referee: Yuichi Nishimura (Japan)

14 June 2008 2010 FIFA world cup qualification	Kuwait	2–3	United Arab Emirates	Salmiya, Kuwait
20:45 UTC+3	Ajab 52', 79'	Report	Matar 23', 39'; Mohammed 90+1'	Stadium: Thamir Stadium; Attendance: 20,000; Referee: Subkhiddin Mohd Salleh (Malaysia)

22 June 2008 2010 FIFA world cup qualification	United Arab Emirates	1–3	Syria	Al Ain, United Arab Emirates
20:00 UTC+4	Matar 83' (pen.)	Report	Al-Hussain 34', 51'; Malki 90+3'	Stadium: Tahnoun bin Mohammed Stadium; Attendance: 7,000; Referee: Mark Shield (Australia)

20 August 2008 Friendly	Algeria	1–0	United Arab Emirates	Le Touquet, France
20:00 UTC+2	Bezzaz 8'	Report		Stadium: Stade Ferdinand Petit; Referee: Antony Gautier (France)

29 August 2008 Friendly	United Arab Emirates	2–3	Bahrain	Abu Dhabi, United Arab Emirates
21:00 UTC+4	Matar 33'; Al Shehhi 51'	Report	Adnan 10', 75'; Al Dakheel 80'	Stadium: Mohammed bin Zayed Stadium

6 September 2008 2010 FIFA World Cup Qualification	United Arab Emirates	1–2	North Korea	Abu Dhabi, United Arab Emirates
22:15 UTC+4	Saeed 86'	Report	Kum-Chol 72'; Chol-hyok 81'	Stadium: Mohammed bin Zayed Stadium; Attendance: 10,000; Referee: Ravshan Irmatov (Uzbekistan)

10 September 2008 2010 FIFA World Cup Qualification	United Arab Emirates	1–2	Saudi Arabia	Abu Dhabi, United Arab Emirates
22:15 UTC+4	Khater 23'	Report	Otaif 69'; Al-Fraidi 73'	Stadium: Mohammed bin Zayed Stadium; Attendance: 15,000; Referee: Yuichi Nishimura (Japan)

9 October 2008 Friendly	Japan	1–1	United Arab Emirates	Niigata, Japan
14:20 UTC+9	Kagawa 72'	Report	Al Hammadi 77'	Stadium: Denka Big Swan Stadium; Referee: Subkhiddin Salleh (Malaysia)

15 October 2008 2010 FIFA World Cup Qualification	South Korea	4–1	United Arab Emirates	Seoul, South Korea
20:00 UTC+9	Keun-ho 20', 80'; Ji-sung 26'; Tae-hwi 89'	Report	Al Hammadi 72'	Stadium: Seoul World Cup Stadium; Attendance: 30,000; Referee: Matthew Breeze (Australia)

19 November 2008 2010 FIFA World Cup Qualification	United Arab Emirates	1–1	Iran	Dubai, United Arab Emirates
19:15 UTC+4	Jumaa 19'	Report	Bagheri 81'	Stadium: Al Maktoum Stadium; Attendance: 8,000; Referee: Subkhiddin Salleh (Malaysia)

27 December 2008 Friendly	United Arab Emirates	2–2	Iraq	Al Ain, United Arab Emirates
18:30 UTC+4	Omar 49'; Jumaa 80'	Report	Shakroun 42'; Rehema 85'	Stadium: Khalifa bin Zayed Stadium

30 December 2008 Friendly	United Arab Emirates	0–0	Kuwait	Dubai, United Arab Emirates
18:40 UTC+4		Report		Stadium: Zabeel Stadium

=== 2009 ===
5 January 2009 2009 Gulf Cup	United Arab Emirates	3–1	Yemen	Muscat, Oman
18:08 UTC+4	Omar 6' (pen.); Al Hammadi 14'; Al Shehhi 67'	Report	Al Nono 90+1'	Stadium: Royal Oman Police Stadium

8 January 2009 2009 Gulf Cup	Qatar	0–0	United Arab Emirates	Muscat, Oman
18:00 UTC+4		Report		Stadium: Royal Oman Police Stadium

11 January 2009 2009 Gulf Cup	United Arab Emirates	0–3	Saudi Arabia	Muscat, Oman
18:00 UTC+4		Report	Al-Qahtani 58'; Al-Zori 70'; Al-Fraidi 72'	Stadium: Sultan Qaboos Sports Complex

21 January 2009 2011 Asian Cup Qualification	Malaysia	0–5	United Arab Emirates	Kuala Lumpur, Malaysia
20:45 UTC+8		Report	Omar 29', 45+1' (pen.); Matar 62', 76'; Khalil 85'	Stadium: Kuala Lumpur Stadium; Attendance: 10,000; Referee: Ben Williams (Australia)

28 January 2009 2011 Asian Cup Qualification	United Arab Emirates	0–1	Uzbekistan	Sharjah, United Arab Emirates
19:00 UTC+4		Report	Tadjiyev 30'	Stadium: Sharjah Stadium; Attendance: 15,000; Referee: Yuichi Nishimura (Japan)

28 March 2009 2010 FIFA World Cup Qualification	North Korea	2–0	United Arab Emirates	Pyongyang, North Korea
15:30 UTC+9	Nam-chol 51'; In-guk 70'	Report		Stadium: Kim Il Sung Stadium; Attendance: 50,000; Referee: Matthew Breeze (Australia)

1 April 2009 2010 FIFA World Cup Qualification	Saudi Arabia	3–2	United Arab Emirates	Riyadh, Saudi Arabia
20:30 UTC+3	Otaif 4' (pen.); Jumaa 70' (o.g.); Hazazi 85'	Report	Al-Shehhi 38'; Matar 45+1'	Stadium: King Fahd International Stadium; Attendance: 70,000; Referee: Subkhiddin Salleh (Malaysia)

2 June 2009 Friendly	United Arab Emirates	2–7	Germany	Dubai, United Arab Emirates
20:00 UTC+4	Al Hammadi 53'; Mubarak 73'	Report	Westermann 29'; Gómez 35', 45', 47', 90'; Trochowski 39'; Jumaa 52' (o.g.)	Stadium: Al Maktoum Stadium; Attendance: 25,000; Referee: Naser Al-Ghafary (Jordan)

6 June 2009 2010 FIFA World Cup Qualification	United Arab Emirates	0–2	South Korea	Dubai, United Arab Emirates
20:15 UTC+4		Report	Chu-young 9'; Sung-yueng 37'	Stadium: Al Maktoum Stadium; Attendance: 4,000; Referee: Abdullah Balideh (Qatar)

10 June 2009 2010 FIFA World Cup Qualification	Iran	1–0	United Arab Emirates	Tehran, Iran
19:00 UTC+4:30	Karimi 53'	Report		Stadium: Azadi Stadium; Attendance: 38,000; Referee: Ravshan Irmatov (Uzbekistan)

10 October 2009 Friendly	United Arab Emirates	1–1	Palestine	Dubai, United Arab Emirates
19:00 UTC+4	Al Kass 50'	Report	Al Amour 35'	Stadium: Zabeel Stadium; Referee: Banjar Al Dosari (Qatar)

14 October 2009 Friendly	United Arab Emirates	3–1	Jordan	Dubai, United Arab Emirates
19:00 UTC+4	Al-Shehhi 35'; Al Khalifi 56'; Srour 79' (pen.)	Report	Deeb 68'	Stadium: Maktoum bin Rashid Al Maktoum Stadium; Referee: Abdullah Al Hilali (Oman)

15 November 2009 International Cup	United Arab Emirates	0–0 (3–2 p)	Czech Republic	Al Ain, United Arab Emirates
15:30 UTC+4		Report		Stadium: Tahnoun bin Mohammed Stadium; Referee: Suleiman Jaber (Jordan)

18 November 2009 International Cup	United Arab Emirates	0–1	Iraq	Al Ain, United Arab Emirates
15:00 UTC+4		Report	Karim 22'	Stadium: Tahnoun bin Mohammed Stadium; Referee: Samir Mahmoud (Egypt)

16 December 2009 Friendly	Kuwait	0–0	United Arab Emirates	Kuwait City, Kuwait
18:30 UTC+3		Report		Stadium: Al Kuwait Sports Club Stadium

== Statistics ==
=== Managers ===
Name	First match	Last match	Pld	W	D	L	GF	GA	GD
(United Arab Emirates) Abdullah Mesfer	19 February 2000	23 February 2000	3	2	1	0	3	1	+2
(France) Henri Michel	16 August 2000	11 May 2001	17	7	3	7	40	26	+14
(United Arab Emirates) Abdullah Saqr	18 May 2001	31 August 2001	6	2	1	3	9	11	–2
(Netherlands) Tiny Ruys	7 September 2001	31 January 2001	8	3	2	3	8	9	–1
(Netherlands) Jo Bonfrère	17 January 2002	29 January 2002	5	1	0	4	3	7	–4
(England) Roy Hodgson	16 December 2002	11 January 2004	19	6	6	7	30	28	+2
(France) Jean-François Jodar	18 February 2004	9 June 2004	4	2	1	1	6	3	+3
(Netherlands) Aad de Mos	10 July 2004	9 February 2005	16	3	5	8	19	26	–7
(United Arab Emirates) Jumaa Rabie	24 May 2005	27 May 2005	2	1	1	0	1	0	+1
(Netherlands) Dick Advocaat	29 July 2005	31 July 2005	2	0	2	0	1	1	0
(United Arab Emirates) Jumaa Rabie	23 September 2005	11 October 2005	2	0	2	0	2	2	0
(United Arab Emirates) Badr Saleh	12 November 2005	16 November 2005	2	1	0	1	3	8	–5
(France) Dominique Bathenay	2 December 2005	1 March 2006	4	3	1	0	7	2	+5
(France) Bruno Metsu	2 May 2006	10 September 2008	41	13	9	19	44	55	–11
(France) Dominique Bathenay	15 October 2008	10 June 2009	15	2	5	8	18	28	–10
(Slovenia) Srečko Katanec	10 October 2009	16 December 2009	5	1	3	1	4	3	+1
Total			151	47	42	62	200	209	–9

=== Head to head records ===
Head to head records
Opponent	P	W	D	L	GF	GA	W%	D%	L%
Algeria	1	0	0	1	0	1	0	0	100
Azerbaijan	1	0	1	0	3	3	0	100	0
Bahrain	6	0	1	5	9	17	0	16.67	83.33
Belarus	1	0	0	1	2	3	0	0	100
Benin	2	0	1	1	0	1	0	50	50
Brazil	1	0	0	1	0	8	0	0	100
Brunei	2	2	0	0	16	0	100	0	0
China	4	0	2	2	2	6	0	50	50
Czech Republic	1	0	1	0	0	0	0	100	0
Egypt	3	0	1	2	2	4	0	33.33	66.67
Germany	1	0	0	1	2	7	0	0	100
Hong Kong	1	0	1	0	1	1	0	100	0
India	2	1	0	1	1	1	50	0	50
Iran	8	0	2	6	1	10	0	25	75
Iraq	5	0	3	2	5	7	0	60	40
Japan	4	1	1	2	4	7	25	25	50
Jordan	5	3	2	0	9	2	60	40	0
Kazakhstan	1	1	0	0	5	2	100	0	0
Kenya	1	0	1	0	2	2	0	100	0
Kuwait	12	5	4	3	15	12	41.67	33.33	25
Lebanon	3	1	2	0	4	3	33.33	66.67	0
Libya	1	0	1	0	1	1	0	100	0
Malaysia	1	1	0	0	5	0	100	0	0
North Korea	5	2	1	2	3	4	40	20	40
Norway	1	0	1	0	1	1	0	100	0
Oman	14	4	4	6	15	18	28.57	28.57	42.86
Pakistan	2	2	0	0	7	3	100	0	0
Palestine	1	0	1	0	1	1	0	100	0
Peru	1	0	1	0	0	0	0	100	0
Poland	1	0	0	1	2	5	0	0	100
Qatar	7	2	3	2	6	8	28.57	42.86	28.57
Saudi Arabia	11	2	0	9	7	21	18.18	0	81.82
Singapore	2	1	1	0	3	2	50	50	0
Slovakia	1	0	0	1	1	2	0	0	100
Slovenia	1	0	1	0	1	1	0	100	0
South Korea	6	1	1	4	4	13	16.67	16.67	66.67
Sri Lanka	3	3	0	0	12	1	100	0	0
Syria	6	4	1	1	13	7	66.67	16.67	16.67
Switzerland	2	1	0	1	2	2	50	0	50
Thailand	3	1	1	1	2	4	33.33	33.33	33.33
Togo	1	0	0	1	0	5	0	0	100
Tunisia	1	0	0	1	0	1	0	0	100
Turkmenistan	2	0	1	1	1	2	0	50	50
Uzbekistan	4	2	1	1	7	4	50	25	25
Vietnam	3	2	0	1	6	2	66.67	0	33.33
Yemen	7	5	0	2	16	9	71.43	0	28.57
Totals	151	47	42	62	200	209	31.13	27.81	41.06
