= 2002–03 Al Ain FC season =

Al Ain
2002–03 season
- President: Mohammed Bin Zayed
- Manager: Bruno Metsu
- Stadium: Tahnoun bin Mohammed
- UAE Football League: 1st
- President's Cup: Quarter-finals
- UAE Super Cup: Winners
- AFC Champions League: Winners
- Top goalscorer: League: Boubacar Sanogo (15); All: Boubacar Sanogo (24)
Home colours	Away colours	Third colours

The 2002–03 season was Al Ain Football Club's 35th season in existence and the club's 28th consecutive season in the top-level football league in the UAE.

== Club ==
=== Staff ===
Position	Name
Head coach	(France) Bruno Metsu

== Competitions ==
=== Overview ===
Competition	First match	Last match	Starting round	Final position	Record							
Competition	First match	Last match	Starting round	Final position	Pld	W	D	L	GF	GA	GD	Win %
Football League	18 October 2002	3 March 2003	Matchday 1	Winners	22	14	6	2	51	20	+31	63.64
President's Cup	13 September 2002	2 May 2003	Group stage	Quarter-finals	8	6	1	1	23	6	+17	75.00
UAE Super Cup	7 May 2003	16 May 2003	Semi-finals	Winners	3	2	1	0	6	3	+3	66.67
AFC Champions League	9 March 2003	11 October 2003	Group stage	Winners	7	5	0	2	15	8	+7	71.43
Total					40	27	8	5	95	37	+58	67.50

Last updated: 11 October 2003
Source: Soccerway

=== UAE Football League ===
==== League table ====
Pos	Team	Pld	W	D	L	GF	GA	GD	Pts
1	Al Ain	22	14	6	2	51	20	+31	48
2	Al Wahda	22	12	7	3	50	29	+21	43
3	Al Ahli	22	9	7	6	47	36	+11	34
4	Al-Nasr	22	8	10	4	36	25	+11	34
5	Al-Shaab	22	8	8	6	39	31	+8	32

Source: rsssf.com

===== Matches =====
18 October 2002 1	Al Ain	4–0	Sharjah	Al Ain
19:30	Sanogo 43'; Msarri 51'; S. Rashed 77'; M. Omar 82'			Stadium: Tahnoun bin Mohammed

24 October 2002 2	Al Shabab	2–2	Al Ain	Dubai
	W. Obaid 38'; J. Khater 87' (o.g.)		Kherrazi 20'; M. Omar 30'	Stadium: Maktoum bin Rashid Al Maktoum

30 October 2002 3	Al Ain	5–3	Al Wahda	Al Ain
	S. Khater 17'; S. Rashed 24'; M. Omar 61', 88'; Fahad. A 78'		Sérgio 5'; A. Jumaa 45'; F. Masoud 52'	Stadium: Tahnoun bin Mohammed

7 November 2002 4	Al Dhafra	0–1	Al Ain	Abu Dhabi
			F. Ali 60'

14 November 2002 5	Al Ain	3–2	Al Wasl	Al Ain
	Sanogo 11', 46'; M. Omar 86'		I. Ali 10'; Majidi 65'	Stadium: Tahnoun bin Mohammed

22 November 2002 6	Dubai	1–1	Al Ain	Dubai
	Montecinos 65'		M. Omar 88'

2 December 2002 7	Al Ain	2–4	Al Ahli	Al Ain
	M. Omar 6'; S. Rashed 45'		H. Ali 8' (pen.); Kazemian 48'; Karimi 62'; F. Khalil 93'	Stadium: Tahnoun bin Mohammed

12 December 2002 8	Al Shaab	0–2	Al Ain	Sharjah
			S. Khater 80'; S. Joher 90'	Stadium: Khalid bin Mohammed Stadium

19 December 2002 9	Ittihad Kalba	1–1	Al Ain	Kalba
	Tamba 58'		Sanogo 52'	Stadium: Ittihad Kalba Stadium

26 December 2002 10	Al Ain	5–1	Al Jazira	Al Ain
	Sanogo 18', 40'; F. Ali 28'; M. Omar 64'; S. Joher 68'		Weah 61'	Stadium: Tahnoun bin Mohammed

31 December 2002 11	Al Nasr	1–1	Al Ain	Dubai
	N'Diaye 13'		Sanogo 5'	Stadium: Al Maktoum Stadium

7 January 2003 12	Sharjah	1–0	Al Ain	Sharjah
	N. Mubarak 59'			Stadium: Sharjah Stadium

11 January 2003 13	Al Ain	2–0	Al Shabab	Al Ain
	Traoré 50'; R. Yaslam 75'			Stadium: Tahnoun bin Mohammed

17 January 2003 14	Al Wahda	1–1	Al Ain	Abu Dhabi
	A. Jumaa 38' (pen.)		Traoré 78'	Stadium: Al Nahyan Stadium

30 January 2003 15	Al Ain	6–0	Al Dhafra	Al Ain
	Sanogo 3', 12'; Traoré 41'; R. Yaslam 50'; F. Ali 72'; Fahad. A 79'			Stadium: Tahnoun bin Mohammed

5 February 2003 16	Al Wasl	0–0	Al Ain	Dubai
				Stadium: Zabeel Stadium

9 February 2003 17	Al Ain	2–1	Dubai	Al Ain
	Sanogo 57', 90'		Montecinos 74'	Stadium: Tahnoun bin Mohammed

12 February 2003 18	Al Ahli	1–5	Al Ain	Dubai
	Kazemian 52'		Sanogo 12', 55'; S. Khater 23'; Traoré 60', 68'	Stadium: Rashid Stadium

17 February 2003 19	Al Ain	4–1	Al Shaab	Al Ain
	S. Khater 7'; F. Ali 18', 34'; Traoré 44'		Y. Hassan 24'	Stadium: Tahnoun bin Mohammed

22 February 2003 20	Al Ain	1–0	Ittihad Kalba	Al Ain
	Sanogo 59'			Stadium: Tahnoun bin Mohammed

27 February 2003 21	Al Jazira	0–2	Al Ain	Abu Dhabi
			S. Khater 15'; Sanogo 88'

3 March 2003 22	Al Ain	1–0	Al Nasr	Al Ain
	Traoré 26'			Stadium: Tahnoun bin Mohammed

=== UAE President's Cup ===
==== Group D ====
Team	Pld	W	D	L	GF	GA	GD	Pts
Al Ain	6	5	1	0	17	3	+14	16
Al Wasl	6	4	1	1	14	4	+10	13
Al Shabab	6	4	1	1	14	4	+10	13
Al Khaleej	6	2	2	2	8	10	−2	8
Hatta	6	1	2	3	6	14	−8	5
Al Hamriyah	6	1	1	4	5	17	−12	4
Al Jazirah Al Hamra	6	0	0	6	2	14	−12	0

Source: rsssf.org

13 September 2002 Round 1	Al Ain	6–0	Al Hamriyah
	Msarri 4'; H. Saeed 31'; Sanogo 32', 43'; M. Omar 61'; Musabbah .S 75'	Report

20 September 2002 Round 2	Al Khaleej	1–3	Al Ain
	A. Mohammed 53'		Sanogo 8' (pen.); R. Yaslam 24', 84'

26 September 2002 Round 3	Al Ain	1–1	Al Shabab	Dubai
	Fahad. A 48'	Report	Daei 36'	Stadium: Zabeel Stadium

2 October 2002 Round 4	Al Wasl	0–2	Al Ain
			Sanogo 41'; Kherrazi 42'

10 October 2002 Round 5	Al Ain	4–1	Hatta
	S. Khater 15', 65'; Fahad. A 17'; Sanogo 75'	Report	Anan 35'

20 March 2003 Round 6	Al Jazirah Al Hamra	0–1	Al Ain
			M. Omar 20'

===== Round of 16 =====
30 March 2003	Al Ain	6–0	Al Urooba	Dubai
			M. Omar 11', 24'; S. Joher 27'; G. Harib 32'; F. Ali 44'; R. Yaslam 75'	Stadium: Maktoum bin Rashid Al Maktoum

===== Quarter-finals =====
2 May 2003	Al Ain	0–3	Sharjah	Abu Dhabi
			Barbosa 56', 93'; M. Rashid 81'	Stadium: Al Nahyan Stadium

=== UAE Super Cup ===
==== Semi-finals ====
7 May 2003 First leg	Al Ahli	0–0	Al Ain	Dubai
				Stadium: Rashid Stadium

11 May 2003 Second leg	Al Ain	3–2	Al Ahli	Al Ain
	F. Ali 25', 64'; M. Qassim 69' (o.g.)	Report	F. Khalil 46'; Karimi 52'	Stadium: Tahnoun Bin Mohamed

==== Final ====
16 May 2003 Final	Al Ain	3–1	Al Wahda	Sharjah
	F. Ali 18'; S. Khater 34', 89'	Report; Report	Y. Salem 84'	Stadium: Sharjah Stadium; Attendance: 10,000; Referee: Fareed Al-Marzouqi

=== AFC Champions League ===
==== Group stage ====
===== Group C =====
Team	Pld	W	D	L	GF	GA	GD	Pts
(United Arab Emirates) Al Ain (H)	3	3	0	0	6	1	+5	9
(Qatar) Al Sadd	3	1	0	2	4	5	−1	3
(Iran) Esteghlal	3	1	0	2	5	7	−2	3
(Saudi Arabia) Al-Hilal	3	1	0	2	4	6	−2	3

(H) Hosts

9 March 2003	Al Ain (United Arab Emirates)	1–0	(Saudi Arabia) Al-Hilal	Al Ain
	G. Harib 12' (pen.)	Report		Stadium: Tahnoun Bin Mohamed; Attendance: 6,500; Referee: Shaban Qassem

12 March 2003	Al Ain (United Arab Emirates)	2–0	(Qatar) Al Sadd	Al Ain
	Traoré 24'; Sanogo 89'	Report		Stadium: Tahnoun Bin Mohamed; Attendance: 9,000; Referee: Lu Jun

15 March 2003	Esteghlal (Iran)	1–3	(United Arab Emirates) Al Ain	Al Ain
	Samereh 67'	Report	F. Ali 65'; Sanogo 76'; G. Harib 78'	Stadium: Tahnoun Bin Mohamed; Attendance: 15,000; Referee: Lu Jun

===== Semi-finals =====
9 April 2003 First leg	Al Ain (United Arab Emirates)	4–2	(China) Dalian Shide	Al Ain
	Sanogo 62' (pen.) 83'; M. Omar 64'; R. Yaslam 75'	Report	Haidong 17'; Yao 88'	Stadium: Tahnoun Bin Mohamed; Attendance: 20,000; Referee: Ahdul Rahman

30 August 2003 (Note: Matches was postponed from 22 April 2003 to 30 August 2003 due to SARS outbreak in China.) Second leg	Dalian Shide (China)	4–3 (6–7 agg.)	(United Arab Emirates) Al Ain	Dalian
	Peng 27'; Janković 77'; Haidong 81', 84'	Report	Mendes 46'; M. Omar 65'; Majidi 87'	Stadium: People's Stadium; Attendance: 46,000; Referee: Masayoshi Okada

===== Final =====
3 October 2003 First leg	Al Ain (United Arab Emirates)	2–0	(Thailand) BEC Tero Sasana	Al Ain
	Majidi 38'; Majidi 74'	Report		Stadium: Tahnoun Bin Mohamed

11 October 2003 Second leg	BEC Tero Sasana (Thailand)	1–0 (1–2 agg.)	(United Arab Emirates) Al Ain	Bangkok
	Chaiman 60' (pen.)	Report		Stadium: Rajamangala Stadium

== Statistics ==
=== Goalscorers ===
As of 11 October 2003

Includes all competitive matches. The list is sorted alphabetically by surname when total goals are equal.

Rank	Pos.	Player	Football League	President's Cup	Super Cup	Champions League	Total
1	FW	(Ivory Coast) Boubacar Sanogo	15	5	0	4	24
2	FW	(United Arab Emirates) Mohammad Omar	8	4	0	2	14
3	FW	(United Arab Emirates) Faisal Ali	5	1	3	1	10
4	MF	(United Arab Emirates) Subait Khater	5	2	2	0	9
5	FW	(Ivory Coast) Kandia Traoré	7	0	0	1	8
6	MF	(United Arab Emirates) Rami Yaslam	2	3	0	1	6
7	DF	(United Arab Emirates) Fahad Ali	2	2	0	0	4
8	FW	(Iran) Farhad Majidi	0	0	0	3	3
8	MF	(United Arab Emirates) Gharib Harib	0	1	0	2	3
8	MF	(United Arab Emirates) Sultan Rashed	3	0	0	0	3
8	MF	(United Arab Emirates) Salem Johar	2	1	0	0	3
12	FW	(Morocco) Said Kherrazi	1	1	0	0	2
12	DF	(United Arab Emirates) Ali Msarri	1	1	0	0	2
14	FW	(United Arab Emirates) Musabbah Salem	0	1	0	0	1
14	FW	(Brazil) Rodrigo Mendes	0	0	0	1	1
14	MF	(United Arab Emirates) Helal Saeed	0	1	0	0	1
Own goals (from the opponents)			0	0	1	0	1
Totals			51	23	6	15	95
