= 2005–06 Al Ain FC season =

Al Ain
2005–06 season
- President: Mohammed Bin Zayed
- Manager: Milan Máčala (from 7 January 2005) (until 1 January 2006); Mohammad El Mansi* (from 1 January 2006) (until 27 May 2007)
- Stadium: Tahnoun bin Mohammed
- UAE Football League: 4th
- President's Cup: Winners
- Federation Cup: Winners
- AFC Champions League: 2005: Runner-ups; 2006: Quarter-finals (Note: Advanced to next round but the cup continued in next season.)
- Top goalscorer: League: Rami Yaslam (8); All: Nenad Jestrović (14)
| Home colours | Away colours |
- All statistics correct as of 21 May 2006.

The 2005–06 season was Al Ain Football Club's 38th season in existence and the club's 31st consecutive season in the top-level football league in the UAE.

== Competitions ==
=== Overview ===
| Competition | First match | Last match | Starting round | Final position | Record | | | | | | | |
| Competition | First match | Last match | Starting round | Final position | Pld | W | D | L | GF | GA | GD | Win % |
|---|---|---|---|---|---|---|---|---|---|---|---|---|
| Football League | 1 September 2005 | 21 May 2006 | Matchday 1 | 4th | 22 | 13 | 2 | 7 | 42 | 23 | +19 | 59.09 |
| President's Cup | 27 December 2005 | 3 April 2006 | Round of 16 | Winners | 6 | 5 | 1 | 0 | 12 | 5 | +7 | 83.33 |
| Federation Cup | 10 November 2005 | 27 February 2006 | Group stage | Winners | 4 | 3 | 0 | 1 | 11 | 5 | +6 | 75.00 |
| 2005 ACL | 14 September 2005 | 5 November 2005 | Quarter-finals | Runner-ups | 6 | 1 | 4 | 1 | 13 | 9 | +4 | 16.67 |
| 2006 ACL | 8 March 2006 | 17 May 2006 | Group stage | Quarter-finals | 6 | 4 | 1 | 1 | 10 | 6 | +4 | 66.67 |
| Total | | | | | 44 | 26 | 8 | 10 | 88 | 48 | +40 | 59.09 |

Last updated: 21 May 2006
Source: Competitions

=== UAE Football League ===
==== League table ====
| Pos | Team | Pld | W | D | L | GF | GA | GD | Pts | Qualification or relegation |
|---|---|---|---|---|---|---|---|---|---|---|
| 2 | Al Ahli | 22 | 14 | 5 | 3 | 44 | 24 | +20 | 47 | Qualification for Championship Playoff |
| 3 | Al Jazira | 22 | 14 | 3 | 5 | 43 | 35 | +8 | 45 | |
| 4 | Al Ain | 22 | 13 | 2 | 7 | 42 | 23 | +19 | 41 | Qualification for 2007 AFC Champions League (Note: Al Ain qualified to the 2007 AFC Champions League as winners of the 2005–06 UAE President's Cup.) |
| 5 | Al Nasr | 22 | 11 | 2 | 9 | 50 | 35 | +15 | 35 | |
| 6 | Al Shabab | 22 | 10 | 4 | 8 | 40 | 39 | +1 | 34 | |

Source: rsssf.com

==== Matches ====
| 1 September 2005 1 | Al Ain | 1–0 | Al Nasr | Al Ain |
| 20:20 | Tejada 77' | Report | | Stadium: Tahnoun bin Mohammed; Referee: Ali Al-Badwawi |

| 7 September 2005 2 | Al Jazira | 2–1 | Al Ain | Abu Dhabi |
| 20:15 | Ogbeche 67', 89' | Report | R. Yaslam 50' | Stadium: Mohammed bin Zayed; Referee: Khaled Al-Doukhi |

| 6 October 2005 4 | Dibba Al-Hisn | 0–4 | Al Ain | Dibba Al-Hisn |
| 21:30 | | Report | Nwoha 1'; Tejada 62'; Al-Wehaibi 70'; Shehab .A 81' | Stadium: Dibba Stadium; Referee: Khaled Al-Doukhi |

| 17 October 2005 5 | Al Ain | 1–0 | Sharjah | Al Ain |
| 21:30 | Nwoha 14' | Report | | Stadium: Tahnoun bin Mohammed; Referee: Fareed Al-Marzouqi |

| 20 November 2005 7 | Al Ain | 6–2 | Baniyas | Al Ain |
| 16:50 | S. Khater 12', 85'; R. Yaslam 67'; Ishak 79'; Nwoha 82', 89' | Report | Restrepo 17'; Dogbé 60' | Stadium: Tahnoun bin Mohammed; Referee: Salah Amen |

| 26 November 2005 8 | Al Shabab | 2–1 | Al Ain | Dubai |
| 19:10 | Adel .A 4'; S. Saad 51' | Report | Shehab .A 32' | Stadium: Maktoum bin Rashid Al Maktoum; Referee: Mohamed Al Junaibi |

| 7 December 2005 9 | Al Ain | 2–1 | Al Shaab | Al Ain |
| 19:10 | Nwoha 31'; N. Khamis 88' | Report | Nabil .I 50' | Stadium: Tahnoun bin Mohammed; Referee: Ali Al-Badwawi |

| 14 December 2005 10 | Al Wahda | 4–1 | Al Ain | Abu Dhabi |
| 19:15 | I. Matar 4'; Maurito 60'; Mitrović 72'; A. Jumaa 79' | Report | R. Yaslam 68' | Stadium: Al Nahyan Stadium; Referee: Mohamed Omar |

| 21 December 2005 11 | Emirates | 0–1 | Al Ain | Ras al-Khaimah |
| 16:45 | | Report | F. Ali 59' | Stadium: Emirates Club Stadium; Referee: Ali Al Mulla |

| 1 January 2006 3 | Al Ain | 1–2 | Al Ahli | Al Ain |
| 18:30 | R. Yaslam 89' | Report | Kamburov 10', 88' | Stadium: Tahnoun bin Mohammed; Referee: Fareed Al-Marzouqi |

| 13 January 2006 12 | Al Nasr | 0–1 | Al Ain | Dubai |
| 19:30 | | Report | Jestrović 5' | Stadium: Al Maktoum Stadium; Referee: Ali Al Mulla |

| 22 January 2006 13 | Al Ain | 4–0 | Al Jazira | Al Ain |
| 17:15 | F. Ali 48'; Nwoha 51'; S. Khater 69'; R. Yaslam 87' | Report | | Stadium: Tahnoun bin Mohammed; Referee: Fareed Al-Marzouqi |

| 26 January 2006 6 | Al Wasl | 2–3 | Al Ain | Dubai |
| 18:45 | Majidi 17'; Hassan .A 88' | Report | F. Ali 13'; Jumaa .A 25'; Nwoha 31' | Stadium: Zabeel Stadium; Referee: Ali Al-Badwawi |

| 30 January 2006 14 | Al Ahli | 1–0 | Al Ain | Dubai |
| 19:40 | Shah 24' | Report | | Stadium: Rashid Stadium; Referee: Mohamed Al Junaibi |

| 12 March 2006 15 | Al Ain | 0–0 | Dibba Al-Hisn | Al Ain |
| 20:10 | | Report | | Stadium: Tahnoun bin Mohammed; Referee: Bader Abdullah |

| 16 March 2006 16 | Sharjah | 2–1 | Al Ain | Sharjah |
| 17:45 | Al Kass 37'; Barbosa 42' | Report | Jumaa .A 56' | Stadium: Sharjah Stadium; Referee: Fareed Al-Marzouqi |

| 7 April 2006 17 | Al Ain | 2–1 | Al Wasl | Al Ain |
| 17:55 | Jestrović 21', 22' | Report | I. Ali 35' | Stadium: Tahnoun bin Mohammed; Referee: Khaled Al-Doukhi |

| 16 April 2006 18 | Baniyas | 2–5 | Al Ain | Abu Dhabi |
| 18:00 | Fareed .I 55'; Yousif .J 87' | Report | R. Yaslam 18', 37'; G. Harib 52'; Al-Wehaibi 76'; S. Khater 85' | Referee: Mohamed Al-Zarouni |

| 21 April 2006 19 | Al Ain | 1–2 | Al Shabab | Al Ain |
| 20:15 | Ali .M 14', 63' | Report | Al-Wehaibi 90' | Stadium: Tahnoun bin Mohammed; Referee: Mohamed Omar |

| 7 May 2006 20 | Al Shaab | 0–0 | Al Ain | Sharjah |
| 19:40 | | Report | | Stadium: Khalid bin Mohammed Stadium; Referee: Abdullah Mohammed Al-Shehhi |

| 11 May 2006 21 | Al Ain | 1–0 | Al Wahda | Al Ain |
| 19:45 | S. Khater 75' | Report | | Stadium: Tahnoun bin Mohammed; Referee: Fareed Al-Marzouqi |

| 21 May 2006 22 | Al Ain | 5–0 | Emirates | Al Ain |
| 18:15 | Ishak 4'; R. Yaslam 20'; S. Rashed 39'; Jestrović 58'; Salem .A 85' | Report | | Stadium: Tahnoun bin Mohammed; Referee: Ali Al Mulla |

=== UAE President's Cup ===
| 27 December 2005 Round of 16 | Al Hamriyah | 0–3 | Al Ain | Dubai |
| 18:30 | | Report | Nwoha 28', 65'; R. Yaslam 85' | Stadium: Zabeel Stadium; Referee: Yaseen Al Mansoori |

==== Quarter-finals ====
===== Group B =====
| Team | Pld | W | D | L | GF | GA | GD | Pts |
|---|---|---|---|---|---|---|---|---|
| Al Ain | 3 | 2 | 1 | 0 | 4 | 2 | +2 | 7 |
| Sharjah | 3 | 2 | 0 | 1 | 6 | 5 | +1 | 6 |
| Dubai | 3 | 1 | 1 | 1 | 5 | 5 | 0 | 4 |
| Al Wasl | 3 | 0 | 0 | 3 | 0 | 3 | −3 | 0 |

Source: rsssf.org

| 4 February 2006 1 | Al Ain | 1–1 | Dubai | Abu Dhabi |
| 19:35 | Jestrović 12' | Report | Farhan 34' | Stadium: Al Nahyan Stadium; Referee: Ali Al Mulla |

| 7 February 2006 2 | Al Ain | 1–0 | Al Wasl | Abu Dhabi |
| 19:40 | R. Yaslam 86' | Report | | Stadium: Al Nahyan Stadium; Referee: Ali Al-Badwawi |

| 10 February 2006 3 | Sharjah | 1–2 | Al Ain | Abu Dhabi |
| 17:25 | Barbosa 2' | Report | S. Khater 55', 58' | Stadium: Al Nahyan Stadium; Referee: Mohamed Omar |

==== Semi-finals ====
| 27 March 2006 | Al Ain | 3–2 | Al Nasr | Abu Dhabi |
| 19:20 | Al-Wehaibi 9', 42'; Shehab .A 48' | Report | M. Ibrahim 47'; Mosalam .A 64' | Stadium: Al Nahyan Stadium; Referee: Mohamed Omar |

==== Final ====
| 3 April 2006 | Sharjah | 1–2 | Al Ain | Abu Dhabi |
| 16:40 | Nekounam 64' | Report | Jestrović 61'; Al-Wehaibi 80' | Stadium: Zayed Sports City; Referee: Ali Al-Badwawi |

=== UAE Federation Cup ===
==== Group stage ====
===== Group D =====
| Team | Pld | W | D | L | GF | GA | GD | Pts |
|---|---|---|---|---|---|---|---|---|
| Al Ain | 2 | 1 | 0 | 1 | 5 | 2 | +3 | 3 |
| Sharjah | 2 | 1 | 0 | 1 | 2 | 5 | −3 | 3 |

Source: rsssf.org

| 10 November 2005 1 | Sharjah | 2–1 | Al Ain | Sharjah |
| 16:50 | Salim .S 59'; Barbosa 63' | Report | Ishak 37' | Stadium: Sharjah Stadium; Referee: Musallam Ahmad |

| 17 January 2006 2 | Al Ain | 4–0 | Sharjah | Al Ain |
| 17:00 | Shehab .A 43' (pen.); F. Ali 50'; Nwoha 60'; Kelly 89' (pen.) | Report | | Stadium: Tahnoun bin Mohammed; Referee: Mohamed Al-Zarouni |

==== Semi-finals ====
| 23 February 2006 | Al Jazira | 2–2 (a.e.t.) (1–4 p) | Al Ain | Dubai |
| 17:30 | Ogbeche 65'; Koutouan 113' | Report | Jestrović 70'; Kelly 102' | Stadium: Zabeel Stadium; Referee: Fareed Al-Marzouqi |

==== Final ====
| 27 February 2006 | Al Wahda | 1–4 | Al Ain | Dubai |
| 17:35 | Mitrović 4' | Report | Mohamed .R 36'; Kelly 44'; Jestrović 69' (pen.), 83' | Stadium: Maktoum bin Rashid Al Maktoum; Referee: Mohamed Al-Zarouni |

=== 2005 AFC Champions League ===
==== Quarter-finals ====
| 14 September 2005 First leg | Al Ain (United Arab Emirates) | 1–1 | (Iran) PAS | Al Ain |
| | Nosrati 43' (o.g.) | | Borhani 24' | Stadium: Tahnoun bin Mohammed |

| 21 September 2005 Second leg | PAS (Iran) | 3–3 (4–4a agg.) | (United Arab Emirates) Al Ain | Tehran |
| | Borhani 34', 47'; Traoré 75' | | Tejada 61' (pen.); H. Saeed 83', 84' | Stadium: Shahid Dastgerdi Stadium |

==== Semi-finals ====
| 28 September 2005 First leg | Al Ain (United Arab Emirates) | 6–0 | (China) Shenzhen Jianlibao | Al Ain |
| | S. Khater 4', 81'; Nwoha 10', 22', 77'; Shehab .A 28' | | | Stadium: Tahnoun bin Mohammed |

| 12 October 2005 Second leg | Shenzhen Jianlibao (China) | 0–0 (0–6 agg.) | (United Arab Emirates) Al Ain | Shenzhen |
| | | | | Stadium: Shenzhen Stadium |

==== Final ====
| 26 October 2005 First leg | Al Ain (United Arab Emirates) | 1–1 | (Saudi Arabia) Al-Ittihad | Al Ain |
| | Msarri 50' | | Kallon 85' (pen.) | Stadium: Tahnoun bin Mohammed |

| 5 November 2005 Second leg | Al-Ittihad (Saudi Arabia) | 4–2 (5–3 agg.) | (United Arab Emirates) Al Ain | Jeddah |
| | Kallon 2'; Noor 33'; Job 57'; Al-Dokhi 69' | | Shehab .A 55' (pen.); Tejada 90' | Stadium: Prince Abdullah Al Faisal |

=== 2006 AFC Champions League ===
==== Group stage ====
===== Group B =====
| Team | Pld | W | D | L | GF | GA | GD | Pts |
|---|---|---|---|---|---|---|---|---|
| (United Arab Emirates) Al Ain | 6 | 4 | 1 | 1 | 10 | 6 | +4 | 13 |
| (Saudi Arabia) Al-Hilal | 6 | 3 | 1 | 2 | 12 | 7 | +5 | 10 |
| (Uzbekistan) Mash'al | 6 | 2 | 2 | 2 | 7 | 11 | −4 | 8 |
| (Iraq) Al-Minaa | 6 | 0 | 2 | 4 | 6 | 11 | −5 | 2 |

Source: afcchampionsleague.com

| 8 March 2006 | Al Ain (United Arab Emirates) | 2–0 | (Saudi Arabia) Al-Hilal | Al Ain |
| | F. Ali 42'; Kelly 49' | Report | | Stadium: Tahnoun bin Mohammed; Attendance: 12,500 |

| 22 March 2006 | Mash'al (Uzbekistan) | 1–1 | (United Arab Emirates) Al Ain | Karshi |
| | Mirholdirshaev 90+4' | Report | Diaky 15' | Stadium: Markaziy Stadium; Attendance: 10,000 |

| 12 April 2006 | Al Ain (United Arab Emirates) | 2–1 | (Iraq) Al-Minaa | Al Ain |
| | Jestrović 14', 33' (pen.) | Report | Jabbar 15' | Stadium: Tahnoun bin Mohammed; Attendance: 9,000 |

| 27 April 2006 | Al-Minaa (Iraq) | 1–2 | (United Arab Emirates) Al Ain | Hawally |
| | Falah 7' | Report | Kelly 64' (pen.); Diaky 66' | Stadium: Mohammed Al-Hamad Stadium; Attendance: 250 |

| 4 May 2006 | Al-Hilal (Saudi Arabia) | 2–1 | (United Arab Emirates) Al Ain | Riyadh |
| | Camacho 33'; Al-Shalhoub 86' (pen.) | Report | Jestrović 49' | Stadium: King Fahd II Stadium; Attendance: 60,000 |

| 17 May 2006 | Al Ain (United Arab Emirates) | 2–1 | (Uzbekistan) Mash'al | Al Ain |
| | Jestrović 35', 45' | Report | Kholmurodov 23' | Stadium: Tahnoun bin Mohammed; Attendance: 7,000 |

== Statistics ==
=== Goalscorers ===
As of 21 May 2006

Includes all competitive matches. The list is sorted alphabetically by surname when total goals are equal.

| Rank | Pos. | Player | Football League | President's Cup | Federation Cup | 2005 ACL | 2006 ACL | Total |
|---|---|---|---|---|---|---|---|---|
| 1 | FW | (Serbia and Montenegro) Nenad Jestrović | 4 | 2 | 3 | 0 | 5 | 14 |
| 2 | FW | (Nigeria) Onyekachi Nwoha | 7 | 2 | 1 | 3 | 0 | 13 |
| 3 | MF | (United Arab Emirates) Rami Yaslam | 8 | 2 | 0 | 0 | 0 | 10 |
| 4 | MF | (United Arab Emirates) Subait Khater | 5 | 2 | 0 | 2 | 0 | 9 |
| 5 | MF | (United Arab Emirates) Shehab Ahmed | 2 | 1 | 1 | 2 | 0 | 6 |
| 5 | MF | (United Arab Emirates) Ali Al-Wehaibi | 3 | 3 | 0 | 0 | 0 | 6 |
| 7 | FW | (United Arab Emirates) Faisal Ali | 3 | 0 | 1 | 0 | 1 | 5 |
| 7 | MF | (Brazil) Kelly | 0 | 0 | 3 | 0 | 2 | 5 |
| 9 | FW | (Panama) Luis Tejada | 2 | 0 | 0 | 2 | 0 | 4 |
| 10 | FW | (United Arab Emirates) Naseeb Ishak | 2 | 0 | 1 | 0 | 0 | 3 |
| 11 | MF | (United Arab Emirates) Ibrahim Diaky | 0 | 0 | 0 | 0 | 2 | 2 |
| 11 | MF | (United Arab Emirates) Helal Saeed | 0 | 0 | 0 | 2 | 0 | 2 |
| 11 | DF | (United Arab Emirates) Jumaa Abdullah | 2 | 0 | 0 | 0 | 0 | 2 |
| 14 | MF | (United Arab Emirates) Gharib Harib | 1 | 0 | 0 | 0 | 0 | 1 |
| 14 | DF | (United Arab Emirates) Ali Msarri | 0 | 0 | 0 | 1 | 0 | 1 |
| 14 | FW | (United Arab Emirates) Nasser Khamis | 1 | 0 | 0 | 0 | 0 | 1 |
| 14 | MF | (United Arab Emirates) Salem Abdullah | 1 | 0 | 0 | 0 | 0 | 1 |
| 14 | MF | (United Arab Emirates) Sultan Rashed | 1 | 0 | 0 | 0 | 0 | 1 |
| 14 | MF | (United Arab Emirates) Mohamed Rashed | 0 | 0 | 1 | 0 | 0 | 1 |
| Own goals (from the opponents) | | | 0 | 0 | 0 | 1 | 0 | 1 |
| Totals | | | 42 | 12 | 11 | 13 | 10 | 88 |
