= 15th Arabian Gulf Cup =

International football tournament in 2002

- Arabian Gulf Cup

Tournament details
- Host country: Saudi Arabia
- Dates: 16–30 January
- Venue(s): King Fahd International Stadium, Riyadh

Final positions
- Champions: Saudi Arabia (2nd title)

Tournament statistics
- Matches played: 15
- Goals scored: 33 (2.2 per match)
- Attendance: 355,898 (23,727 per match)
- Top scorer: (Oman) Hani Al-Dhabit (5 goals)
- Best player: (Qatar) Jafal Rashed
- Best goalkeeper: (Saudi Arabia) Mohammed Al-Deayea
- Fair play award: Saudi Arabia

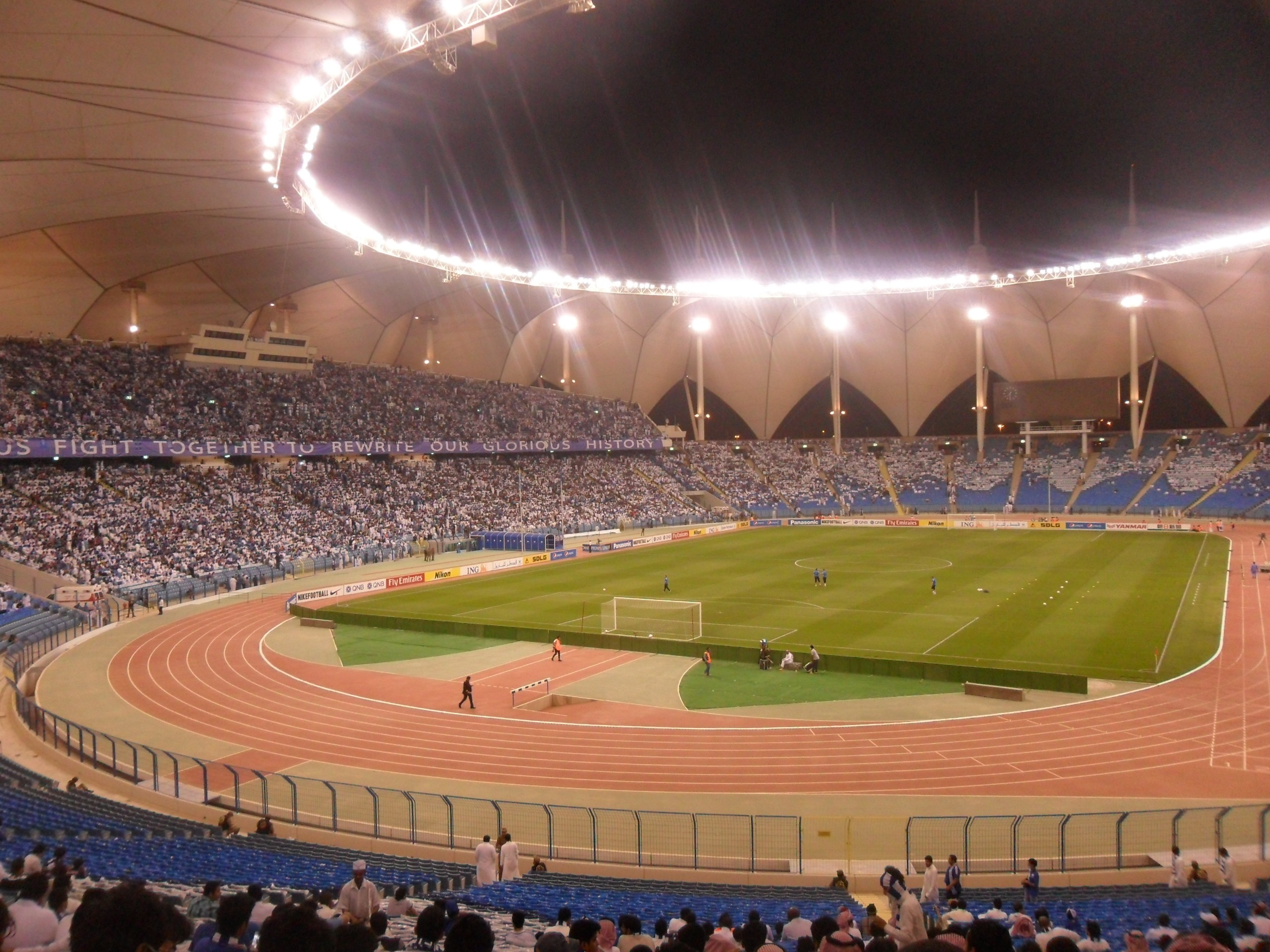
King Fahd International Stadium was Hosts Second Time, 1988 and 2002

The 15th Arabian Gulf Cup (Arabic: كأس الخليج العربي) was held in Riyadh, Saudi Arabia, in January 2002.

The tournament was won by Saudi Arabia for the second time.

Iraq continued to be banned from the tournament because of its invasion of Kuwait in 1990.

== Tournament ==
The teams played a single round-robin style competition. The team achieving first place in the overall standings was the tournament winner.

=== Standings ===
Team	Pld	W	D	L	GF	GA	GD	Pts
Saudi Arabia	5	4	1	0	10	3	+7	13
Qatar	5	4	0	1	7	4	+3	12
Kuwait	5	1	2	2	4	6	−2	5
Bahrain	5	1	2	2	4	6	−2	5
Oman	5	1	1	3	5	7	−2	4
United Arab Emirates	5	1	0	4	3	7	−4	3

=== Results ===
16 January 2002

Saudi Arabia	1–1	Kuwait
Sami Al-Jaber 16'		Al-Huwaidi 49'

17 January 2002

United Arab Emirates	1–0	Oman
Haider Alo Ali 12'

17 January 2002

Qatar	1–0	Bahrain
Jadoua Ali 64'

19 January 2002

Kuwait	1–3	Oman
Al-Huwaidi 80'		Hani Al-Dhabit 66' 71' 93'

20 January 2002

United Arab Emirates	0–2	Qatar
		Jafal Rashed 35' Yasser Nazmi 83'

20 January 2002

Saudi Arabia	3–1	Bahrain
Al-Hasan Al-Yami 14' 32'; Sami Al-Jaber 91'		Rashad Jamal 62'

22 January 2002

Kuwait	0–0	Bahrain

24 January 2002

Oman	1–2	Qatar
Al-Dhabit 7' (pen.)		Al-Tamimi 58'; Bechir 90+2'

24 January 2002

United Arab Emirates	0–1	Saudi Arabia
		Abdullah Al-Jumaan 3'

26 January 2002

Kuwait	0–1	Qatar
		Al-Kuwari 64'

27 January 2002

United Arab Emirates	1–2	Bahrain
Ibrahim 78'		Ali 31'; Isa 90'

27 January 2002

Saudi Arabia	2–0	Oman
Al-Yami 11'; Al-Dosari 79'

29 January 2002

Kuwait	2–1	United Arab Emirates
Al-Huwaidi 31', 39'		Jumaa 65'

30 January 2002

Bahrain	1–1	Oman
Al-Marzooqi 44'		Hani Al-Dhabit 27'

30 January 2002

Qatar	1–3	Saudi Arabia
Hashim 25'		Al-Dosari 79' (pen.); Al-Mohammadi 85'; Al-Meshal 90+5'

== Champions ==
15th Arabian Gulf Cup winners

Saudi Arabia
2nd title
