= 1996–97 Al Ain FC season =

Al Ain
1996–97 season
- President: Mohammed Bin Zayed
- Manager: Lori Sandri; Yusri Abdul Ghani; Cabralzinho
- Stadium: Tahnoun bin Mohammed; Khalifa bin Zayed
- Football League: 5th
- President's Cup: Round of 16
Home colours	Away colours

The 1996–97 season was Al Ain Football Club's 29th in existence and the club's 22nd consecutive season in the top-level football league in the UAE.

== Competitions ==
=== UAE Football League ===
==== League table ====
First stage
Pos	Team	Pld	W	D	L	GF	GA	GD	Pts
1	Al Wahda	18	11	6	1	28	16	+12	39
2	Al Nasr	18	11	4	3	28	14	+14	37
3	Sharjah	18	9	4	5	25	21	+4	31
4	Al Ain	18	8	6	4	29	19	+10	30
5	Al Shabab	18	7	6	5	20	19	+1	27
6	Al Wasl	18	6	4	8	25	23	+2	22
7	Al Khaleej	18	5	6	7	17	22	−5	21
8	Baniyas	18	5	1	12	17	29	−12	16
9	Kalba	18	4	3	11	13	26	−13	15
10	Al Shaab	18	2	4	12	19	32	−13	10

Source: rsssf.com

Second stage
Pos	Team	Pld	W	D	L	GF	GA	GD	BP	Pts
1	Al Wasl	10	6	1	3	14	7	+7	0	19
2	Al Nasr	10	4	4	2	12	7	+5	0	16
3	Al Wahda	10	4	1	5	12	16	−4	3	16
4	Al Shabab	10	4	2	4	11	11	0	0	14
5	Al Ain	10	2	5	3	11	12	−1	0	11
6	Sharjah	10	3	1	6	9	16	−7	0	10

Source: rsssf.com

==== Matches ====
===== First stage =====
1	Ittihad Kalba	0–1	Al Ain	Kalba
				Stadium: Ittihad Kalba Stadium

2	Al Ain	0–0	Al Shabab	Al Ain
				Stadium: Tahnoun bin Mohammed

3	Sharjah	2–1	Al Ain	Sharjah
				Stadium: Sharjah

4	Al Ain	0–1	Al Nasr	Al Ain
				Stadium: Tahnoun bin Mohammed

5	Al Wasl	2–1	Al Ain	Dubai
				Stadium: Zabeel

6	Al Ain	3–3	Al Wahda	Al Ain
				Stadium: Khalifa bin Zayed

7	Al Khaleej	1–1	Al Ain	Khor Fakkan
				Stadium: Al Khaleej Stadium

8	Al Shaab	2–3	Al Ain	Sharjah
				Stadium: Khalid bin Mohammed

9	Al Ain	4–0	Baniyas	Al Ain
				Stadium: Tahnoun bin Mohammed

10	Al Ain	4–0	Ittihad Kalba	Al Ain
				Stadium: Tahnoun bin Mohammed

11	Al Shabab	1–1	Al Ain	Dubai
				Stadium: Maktoum bin Rashid Al Maktoum

12	Al Ain	1–1	Sharjah	Al Ain
				Stadium: Tahnoun bin Mohammed

13	Al Nasr	1–1	Al Ain	Dubai
				Stadium: Al Maktoum

14	Al Ain	1–0	Al Wasl	Al Ain
				Stadium: Tahnoun bin Mohammed

18 November 1996 15	Al Wahda	1–2	Al Ain	Abu Dhabi
				Stadium: Al Nahyan; Referee: Saeed Abdullah

16	Al Ain	1–0	Al Khaleej	Al Ain
				Stadium: Tahnoun bin Mohammed

17	Al Ain	4–3	Al Shaab	Al Ain
				Stadium: Tahnoun bin Mohammed

18	Baniyas	1–0	Al Ain	Bani Yas
				Stadium: Baniyas Stadium

===== Second stage =====
2 January 1997 1	Al Shabab	0–0	Al Ain	Dubai
				Stadium: Maktoum bin Rashid Al Maktoum

8 January 1997 2	Al Ain	2–1	Al Wahda	Al Ain
				Stadium: Tahnoun bin Mohammed

16 January 1997 3	Al Ain	2–1	Al Wasl	Al Ain
				Stadium: Tahnoun bin Mohammed

23 January 1997 4	Sharjah	2–1	Al Ain	Sharjah
				Stadium: Sharjah

30 January 1997 5	Al Ain	1–1	Al Nasr	Al Ain
				Stadium: Tahnoun bin Mohammed

13 February 1997 6	Al Ain	2–2	Al Shabab	Al Ain
	J. Tawfiq; Hamdoon		K. Saad; W. Obaid	Stadium: Tahnoun bin Mohammed; Referee: Abdulaziz Abdullah

20 February 1997 7	Al Wahda	1–0	Al Ain	Abu Dhabi
	A. Matar			Stadium: Al Nahyan; Referee: Saeed Abdullah

24 February 1997 8	Al Wasl	1–0	Al Ain	Dubai
				Stadium: Zabeel

27 February 1997 9	Al Ain	2–2	Sharjah	Al Ain
				Stadium: Tahnoun bin Mohammed

6 March 1997 10	Al Nasr	1–1	Al Ain	Dubai
				Stadium: Al Maktoum

=== UAE President's Cup ===
8 May 1996 Round of 16	Hatta	2–1	Al Ain	Dubai
	S. Rabea 33'; S. Amer 36'		S. Sultan 5'	Stadium: Maktoum bin Rashid Al Maktoum; Referee: Ali Suroor
