= Ismail Al Hammadi =

Emirati footballer (born 1988)

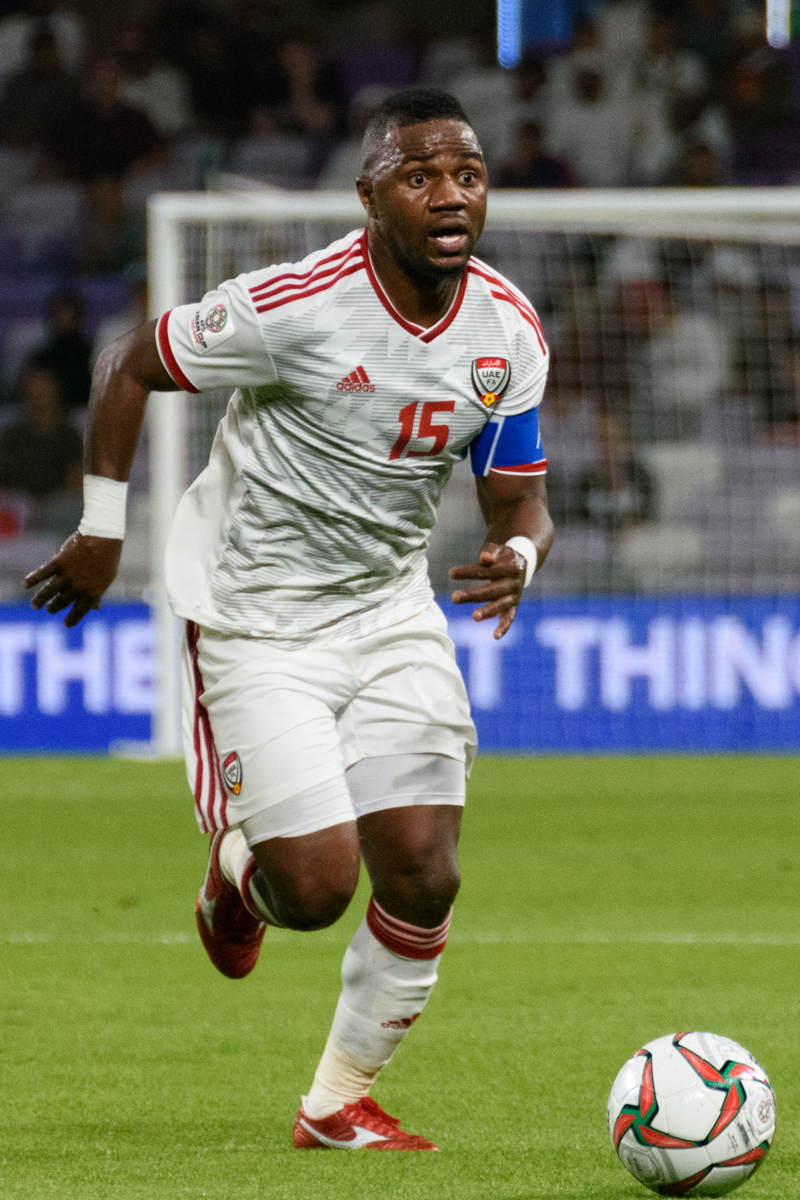
- Al Hammadi with United Arab Emirates at the 2019 Asian cup

Personal information
- Full name: Ismail Salem Ismail Saeed Al Hammadi
- Date of birth: 1 July 1988 (age 38)
- Place of birth: Abu Dhabi, United Arab Emirates
- Height: 1.74 m (5 ft 9 in)
- Position: Winger

Team information
- Current team: Al-Hamriyah
- Number: 7

Senior career*
Years	Team	Apps	(Gls)
2007–2021	Shabab Al-Ahli	274	(46)
2021	→ Khor Fakkan (loan)	13	(3)
2021–2023	Khor Fakkan	40	(4)
2023–2024	Emirates	22	(3)
2024–	Al-Hamriyah	12	(4)

International career^{‡}
2012	United Arab Emirates Olympic (O.P.)	2	(0)
2007–2019	United Arab Emirates	115	(13)
- * Club domestic league appearances and goals ‡ National team caps and goals as of 26 January 2025

Ismail Salem Ismail Saeed Al Hammadi (Arabic: إِسْمَاعِيل سَالِم إِسْمَاعِيل سَعِيد الْحَمَّادِيّ; born 1 July 1988) is an Emirati footballer. He currently plays for Al-Hamriyah and for United Arab Emirates national football team and represented them at the 2012 Summer Olympics.

== International ==
=== International matches ===
As of 2 December 2019

United Arab Emirates national team
Year	Apps	Goals
2007	1	0
2008	13	2
2009	9	2
2010	5	0
2011	15	2
2012	6	0
2013	10	2
2014	14	1
2015	11	0
2016	10	4
2017	4	0
2018	9	0
2019	9	0
Total	116	13

=== International goals ===
Scores and results list the United Arab Emirates' goal tally first.

Goal	Date	Venue	Opponent	Score	Result	Competition
1.	8 October 2008	Tohoku Denryoku Big Swan Stadium, Niigata City, Japan	Japan	1–1	1–1	Friendly
2.	15 October 2008	Seoul World Cup Stadium, Seoul, South Korea	South Korea	1–2	1–4	2010 FIFA World Cup qualification
3.	5 January 2009	Royal Oman Police Stadium, Muscat, Oman	Yemen	2–0	3–1	19th Arabian Gulf Cup
4.	2 June 2009	Maktoum bin Rashid Al Maktoum Stadium, Dubai, United Arab Emirates	Germany	1–6	2–7	Friendly
5.	23 July 2011	Sheikh Khalifa International Stadium, Al Ain, United Arab Emirates	India	3–0	3–0	2014 FIFA World Cup qualification
6.	2 September 2011	Tahnoun bin Mohammed Stadium, Al Ain, United Arab Emirates	Kuwait	1–3	2–3	2014 FIFA World Cup qualification
7.	18 January 2013	Bahrain National Stadium, Riffa, Bahrain	Iraq	2–1	2–1 (a.e.t.)	21st Arabian Gulf Cup
8.	15 November 2013	Zayed Sports City Stadium, Abu Dhabi, United Arab Emirates	Hong Kong	4–0	4–0	2015 AFC Asian Cup qualification
9.	5 March 2014	Bunyodkor Stadium, Tashkent, Uzbekistan	Uzbekistan	1–0	1–1	2015 AFC Asian Cup qualification
10.	16 January 2016	Zayed Sports City Stadium, Abu Dhabi, United Arab Emirates	Iceland	1–1	2–1	Friendly
11.	18 March 2016	Zayed Sports City Stadium, Abu Dhabi, United Arab Emirates	Bangladesh	1–0	6–1	Friendly
12.	18 March 2016	Zayed Sports City Stadium, Abu Dhabi, United Arab Emirates	Bangladesh	3–1	6–1	Friendly
13.	24 March 2016	Zayed Sports City Stadium, Abu Dhabi, United Arab Emirates	Palestine	1–0	2–0	2018 FIFA World Cup qualification

== See also ==
- List of footballers with 100 or more caps
