= Abdulla Al-Marzooqi =

Bahraini footballer

Abdulla Al Marzooqi
Personal information
- Full name: Abdulla Al-Marzooqi
- Date of birth: 12 December 1980 (age 45)
- Place of birth: Bahrain
- Height: 1.84 m (6 ft 0 in)
- Position: Centre-back

Team information
- Current team: Al-Riffa

Youth career
- Al-Riffa

Senior career*
Years	Team	Apps	(Gls)
2000–2004	Al-Riffa	93	(7)
2004–2006	Al-Rayyan	18	(1)
2006–2007	Al-Ta'ee	5	(0)
2007–2010	Al-Kuwait	55	(4)
2010–2011	Al-Sailiya	19	(2)
2011–2013	Al-Riffa		
2013–2014	Busaiteen Club		
2014–2016	East Riffa		

International career^{‡}
2001–2013	Bahrain	113	(10)
- * Club domestic league appearances and goals as of 17 October 2011 ‡ National team caps and goals as of 17 October 2011

Abdullah Al Marzooqi (Arabic: عبد الله المرزوقي, born December 12, 1980 Bahrain) is a Bahraini footballer.

== Club career ==
At the club level, Al Marzooqi currently plays for Al-Sailiya of Qatar, although he currently is on leave in pursuing his academics abroad in North America.

== International career ==
He has been called up to the Bahrain national football team.

== Career statistics ==
=== International goals ===
#	Date	Venue	Opponent	Score	Result	Competition
1.	21 October 2001	Bahrain National Stadium, Riffa, Bahrain	Iran	3-1	Won	2002 World Cup qual.
2.	30 January 2002	King Fahd International Stadium, Riyadh, Saudi Arabia	Oman	1-1	Draw	15th Arabian Gulf Cup
3.	19 September 2003	Bahrain National Stadium, Riffa, Bahrain	Lebanon	4-3	Won	Friendly
4.	20 October 2003	Bahrain National Stadium, Riffa, Bahrain	Myanmar	4-0	Won	2004 Asian Cup qual.
5.	17 December 2004	Ahmed bin Ali Stadium, Al-Rayyan, Qatar	Saudi Arabia	3-0	Won	17th Arabian Gulf Cup
6.	3 August 2005	Bahrain National Stadium, Riffa, Bahrain	Turkmenistan	5-0	Won	Friendly
7.	27 October 2005	Bahrain National Stadium, Riffa, Bahrain	Panama	5-0	Won	Friendly
8.	12 January 2007	Maktoum bin Rashid Al Maktoum Stadium, Dubai, UAE	Yemen	4-0	Won	Friendly
9.	12 January 2007	Maktoum bin Rashid Al Maktoum Stadium, Dubai, UAE	Yemen	4-0	Won	Friendly
10.	21 January 2007	Al-Nahyan Stadium, Abu Dhabi, UAE	Iraq	1-1	Draw	18th Arabian Gulf Cup
Correct as of 14 November 2015

== See also ==
- List of men's footballers with 100 or more international caps
