= 2009 UAE International Cup =

Tournament details
- Host country: UAE
- Dates: 15–18 November
- Teams: 4 (from 2 confederations)
- Venue(s): 1 (in 1 host city)

Final positions
- Champions: Iraq
- Runners-up: United Arab Emirates
- Third place: Azerbaijan
- Fourth place: Czech Republic

Tournament statistics
- Matches played: 4
- Goals scored: 4 (1 per match)
- Top scorer(s): (Iraq) Mahdi Karim (Azerbaijan) Asif Abbasov (Azerbaijan) Vagif Javadov (Iraq) Bassim Abbas (1 goals)

The 2009 UAE International Cup was held in Al Ain City with the participation of four teams. They were UAE, Czech Republic, Iraq and Azerbaijan. The first games were on 15 November 2009. On that day, Iraq played Azerbaijan, and that game was followed by the match between UAE and Czech Republic. The final was played on 18 November 2009 between Iraq and UAE. The third-placed match was also played on that day featuring Azerbaijan and Czech Republic. Iraq were the only team not to concede a goal in the tournament.

== Knockout stage ==
Semifinals
(Iraq)	Iraq	1
(Azerbaijan)	Azerbaijan	0
(United Arab Emirates)	UAE (pen.)	0 (3)
(Czech Republic)	Czech Republic	0 (2)

Finals
(Iraq)	Iraq	1
(United Arab Emirates)	UAE	0
Third place
(Azerbaijan)	Azerbaijan	2
(Czech Republic)	Czech Republic	0

=== Semi-finals ===
15 November 2009
12:45

Iraq	1–0	Azerbaijan
Abbas 88'	(Report)

Tahnoun Bin Mohamed Stadium, Al Ain
Referee: Mohamed Ali Al Junaibi (UAE)

15 November 2009
15:30

United Arab Emirates	0–0	Czech Republic
	(Report)
Penalties
	3 – 2

Tahnoun Bin Mohamed Stadium, Al Ain
Attendance: 5,000
Referee: Suleiman Jaber Dalqam (Jordan)

=== Third place match ===
18 November 2009
12:30

Czech Republic	0–2	Azerbaijan
	(Report)	Javadov 25'; Abishov 89'

Tahnoun Bin Mohamed Stadium, Al Ain
Attendance: 500
Referee: Farid Ali (UAE)

=== Final ===
18 November 2009
15:00

United Arab Emirates	0–1	Iraq
		Karim 20'

Tahnoun Bin Mohamed Stadium, Al Ain
Referee: Samir Mahmoud Othman (Egypt)

== Awards ==
UAE International Cup 2009 winners

Iraq
First title

== Scorers ==
1 goals

- (Iraq) Mahdi Karim
- (Azerbaijan) Ruslan Abishov
- (Azerbaijan) Vagif Javadov
- (Iraq) Bassim Abbas
