= Ahmed Al-Busafy =

Omani footballer (born 1976)

Personal information
- Full name: Ahmed Said Al-Busafy
- Date of birth: 1 September 1976 (age 50)
- Place of birth: Oman
- Position: Midfielder

Senior career*
Years	Team	Apps	(Gls)
1999–2011	Al-Seeb	?	(19)

International career
2002–2008	Oman	1	(1)
- * Club domestic league appearances and goals

Ahmed Al Busafy (Arabic: احمد سعيد البوصافي; born 1 September 1976) is an Omani former footballer. He played for Al-Seeb Club from 1999 to 2011 in the Omani League.

== Club career statistics ==
Club	Season	Division	League		Cup		Continental		Other		Total	
Club	Season	Division	Apps	Goals	Apps	Goals	Apps	Goals	Apps	Goals	Apps	Goals
Al-Seeb	2003–04	Omani League	-	3	-	3	0	0	-	0	-	6
Al-Seeb	2004–05	Omani League	-	4	-	1	0	0	-	0	-	5
Al-Seeb	2005–06	Omani League	-	1	-	0	0	0	-	0	-	1
Al-Seeb	2006–07	Omani League	-	4	-	0	0	0	-	0	-	4
Al-Seeb	2007–08	Omani League	-	3	-	1	0	0	-	0	-	4
Al-Seeb	2008–09	Omani League	-	3	-	0	0	0	-	0	-	3
Al-Seeb	2009–10	Omani League	-	1	-	0	0	0	-	0	-	1
Al-Seeb	Total		-	19	-	5	0	0	-	0	-	24
Career total			-	19	-	5	0	0	-	0	-	24

== International career ==
Ahmed was part of the first team squad of the Oman national football team till 2008. He was selected for the national team for the first time in 2002. He has represented the national team in the 2006 FIFA World Cup qualification.

== National team career statistics ==
=== Goals for Senior National Team ===
#	Date	Venue	Opponent	Score	Result	Competition
	January 23, 2007	Abu Dhabi, UAE	Yemen	2-1	Won	18th Arabian Gulf Cup

== Honours ==
=== Club ===
- With Al-Seeb

- Sultan Qaboos Cup (0): Runners-up 2003, 2005
- Omani Federation Cup (1): 2007
- Oman Super Cup (0): Runners-up 1999, 2004
