= Sultan Al-Touqi =

Omani footballer (born 1984)

Personal information
- Full name: Sultan Mohammed Said Al-Touqi
- Date of birth: 2 January 1984 (age 42)
- Place of birth: Sinaw, Oman
- Height: 1.80 m (5 ft 11 in)
- Position: Midfielder

Youth career
- Fanja

Senior career*
Years	Team	Apps	(Gls)
2003–2005	Muscat		(1)
2005–2006	Al-Qadisiya		
2006–2007	Al-Salmiya		
2007–2008	Al-Shamal		
2008–2009	Al-Shabab		
2009	Al-Shabab		
2009–2010	Al-Suwaiq		

International career
2004–2007	Oman	19	(4)
- * Club domestic league appearances and goals

Sultan Mohammed Said Al-Touqi commonly known as Sultan (Arabic: سلطان محمد سعيد الطوقي; born 2 January 1984) is an Omani former footballer who played as a midfielder. He was capped 19 times by the Oman national team.

== International career ==
Sultan was selected for the Oman national football team for the first time in 2004. He has made appearances in the 2006 FIFA World Cup qualification, the 18th Arabian Gulf Cup and the 2007 AFC Asian Cup qualification and has represented the national team in the 2004 AFC Asian Cup qualification, the 2004 AFC Asian Cup, the 2007 AFC Asian Cup and the 2011 AFC Asian Cup qualification. He was a favorite of former Oman manager Milan Macala, who regularly used him in the Oman national team's midfield. Sultan Al-Touqi was an unsung hero of Oman's golden generation. Al-Touqi has great passing ability and has great off the ball movement. Injury has hampered his career, but he remains one of the best midfielders Oman has ever produced. Sultan Al-Touqi scored against the Yemen at the 2007 Arabian Gulf Cup and he had a powerful shot blocked by the UAE goalkeeper in the final of that same tournament. Sadly for Al-Touqi and Oman, the UAE ended up beating Oman in that final match 1-0 and they won the Arabian Gulf Cup.

== National team career statistics ==
=== Goals for Senior National Team ===
#	Date	Venue	Opponent	Score	Result	Competition
1	6 September 2006	Muscat, Oman	Pakistan	5-0	5-0	2007 AFC Asian Cup qualification
2	8 November 2006	Muscat, Oman	Bahrain	1-1	1-1	Friendly
3	23 January 2007	Abu Dhabi, UAE	Yemen	1-0	2-1	18th Arabian Gulf Cup
