= Adel Jadoua Ali =

Qatari footballer (born 1981)

Personal information
- Full name: Adel Jadoua Ali
- Date of birth: 13 September 1981 (age 45)
- Place of birth: Qatar
- Position: Midfielder

Senior career*
Years	Team	Apps	(Gls)
1999–2001	Al Sadd		
2001–2002	Al Gharafa		
2002	Rapid Vienna	3	(1)
2007–2008	Al Gharafa		
2008–2009	Qatar SC		

International career
2000–2003	Qatar	17	(3)
- * Club domestic league appearances and goals

Adel Jadoua (born 13 September 1981) is a retired Qatari footballer. He previously played for Austrian club Rapid Vienna in 2002.
