= 18th Arabian Gulf Cup =

International football tournament in 2007

كأس الخليج العربي, او خليجي 18 Kass Al-Khaleej Al-Arabi, or Khaleeji 18
- 18th Arabian Gulf Cup official logo

Tournament details
- Host country: United Arab Emirates
- Dates: 17–30 January
- Teams: 8
- Venues: 2 (in 1 host city)

Final positions
- Champions: United Arab Emirates
- Runners-up: Oman

Tournament statistics
- Matches played: 15
- Goals scored: 31 (2.07 per match)
- Top scorer: (United Arab Emirates) Ismail Matar (5 goals)
- Best player: (United Arab Emirates) Ismail Matar
- Best goalkeeper: (Oman) Ali Al-Habsi
- Fair play award: Yemen

The 18th Arabian Gulf Cup (Arabic: كأس الخليج العربي) was the 18th international association football championship for the national teams of the Arabian Peninsula and bordering the Persian Gulf. Hosted by the United Arab Emirates, the competition ran from 17 to 30 January 2007 and was contested by the national teams of Bahrain, Iraq, Kuwait, Oman, Qatar, Saudi Arabia, the United Arab Emirates and Yemen.

Hosts United Arab Emirates and Oman contested the final. Ismail Matar scored the only goal of the match as the United Arab Emirates defeated Oman 1–0 to win the competition.

== Background ==
The first edition of the biennial Arabian Gulf Cup was held in Isa Town, Bahrain in 1970. Qatar were the defending champions after winning the previous edition as hosts in 2004. Kuwait were the most successful team in the history of the competition having won the trophy on nine previous occasions.

== Format ==
In total, eight teams took part in the competition. They were drawn into two single round robin groups of four teams. The winners and runners-up would then contest the semi-finals which would decide the teams contesting the final.

=== Participants ===
- Bahrain
- Iraq
- Kuwait
- Oman
- Qatar
- Saudi Arabia
- United Arab Emirates
- Yemen

== Venues ==
All matches were played at the Zayed Sports City Stadium and the Mohammed bin Zayed Stadium in Abu Dhabi, United Arab Emirates.

Abu Dhabi
Zayed Sports City Stadium	Mohammed bin Zayed Stadium
Capacity: 43,791	Capacity: 24,000

== Group stage ==
=== Group A ===
Oman and the United Arab Emirates advanced to the semi-finals.

==== Table ====
Pos	Team	Pld	W	D	L	GF	GA	GD	Pts	Qualification
1	Oman	3	3	0	0	6	3	+3	9	Advance to semi-finals
2	United Arab Emirates	3	2	0	1	6	5	+1	6	Advance to semi-finals
3	Kuwait	3	0	1	2	4	6	−2	1	
4	Yemen	3	0	1	2	3	5	−2	1	

==== Matches ====
17 January 2007

United Arab Emirates	1–2	Oman
Matar 65'		Bashir 36'; Al Hosni 52'

Zayed Sports City Stadium, Abu Dhabi
17 January 2007

Kuwait	1–1	Yemen
Al-Mutawa 74' (pen.)		Ali Alomki 16'

Zayed Sports City Stadium, Abu Dhabi

20 January 2007

Kuwait	1–2	Oman
Al-Rashidi 81'		Al Hosni 8'; Saleh 85'

Mohammed bin Zayed Stadium, Abu Dhabi
20 January 2007

United Arab Emirates	2–1	Yemen
Omar 2' (pen.); Saeed 64'		Al-Sasi 90+2'

Mohammed bin Zayed Stadium, Abu Dhabi

23 January 2007

Oman	2–1	Yemen
Al-Touqi 1'; Al Busafy 88'		Saleh 9'

Mohammed bin Zayed Stadium, Abu Dhabi
23 January 2007

United Arab Emirates	3–2	Kuwait
Matar 1', 90+1'; Khalil 33'		Al-Mutawa 31'; Al Fahd 35'

Mohammed bin Zayed Stadium, Abu Dhabi

=== Group B ===
Saudi Arabia and Bahrain advanced to the semi-finals.

==== Table ====
Pos	Team	Pld	W	D	L	GF	GA	GD	Pts	Qualification
1	Saudi Arabia	3	2	1	0	4	2	+2	7	Advance to semi-finals
2	Bahrain	3	1	1	1	4	4	0	4	Advance to semi-finals
3	Iraq	3	1	1	1	2	2	0	4	
4	Qatar	3	0	1	2	2	4	−2	1	

==== Matches ====
18 January 2007

Saudi Arabia	2–1	Bahrain
Al-Qahtani 26' (pen.), 89'		Yousef 13' (pen.)

Al Nahyan Stadium, Abu Dhabi
18 January 2007

Qatar	0–1	Iraq
		H.M. Mohammed 39'

Al Nahyan Stadium, Abu Dhabi

21 January 2007

Bahrain	1–1	Iraq
Al-Marzouqi 8'		H.M. Mohammed 11'

Al Nahyan Stadium, Abu Dhabi
21 January 2007

Saudi Arabia	1–1	Qatar
Mouath 72'		Nasser 10'

Al Nahyan Stadium, Abu Dhabi

24 January 2007

Qatar	1–2	Bahrain
Khalfan 19'		Hubail 45', 90+1'

Al Nahyan Stadium, Abu Dhabi
24 January 2007

Saudi Arabia	1–0	Iraq
Al-Qahtani 12' (pen.)

Al Nahyan Stadium, Abu Dhabi

== Semi-finals ==
Badar Al-Maimani scored the only goal as Oman defeated Bahrain and Ismail Matar scored the only goal as the United Arab Emirates defeated Saudi Arabia to advance to the final.

27 January 2007

Oman	1–0	Bahrain
Al-Maimani 55'

Mohammed bin Zayed Stadium, Abu Dhabi

27 January 2007

Saudi Arabia	0–1	United Arab Emirates
		Matar 90+1'

Al Nahyan Stadium, Abu Dhabi

== Final ==
Matar scored his fifth goal of the tournament, the only goal of the match, as the United Arab Emirates defeated Oman to win the competition.

30 January 2007

Oman	0–1	United Arab Emirates
		Matar 72'

Zayed Sports City Stadium, Abu Dhabi

== Goalscorers ==
There were 34 goals scored in 15 matches, for an average of 2.27 goals per match.

5 goals

- (United Arab Emirates) Ismail Matar

3 goals

- (Saudi Arabia) Yasser Al-Qahtani

2 goals

- (Oman) Amad Al Hosni
- (Bahrain) A'ala Hubail
- (Iraq) Hawar Mulla Mohammed
- (Kuwait) Bader Al-Mutawa

1 goal

- (Bahrain) Talal Yousef
- (Kuwait) Fahd Al Fahd
- (Kuwait) Fahad Al Hamad
- (Kuwait) Fahad Al-Rashidi
- (Oman) Ahmed Al Busafy
- (Oman) Sultan Al-Touqi
- (Oman) Fawzi Bashir
- (Oman) Badar Al-Maimani
- (Oman) Hashim Saleh
- (Qatar) Khalfan Ibrahim
- (Qatar) Ali Nasser
- (Saudi Arabia) Malek Mouath
- (United Arab Emirates) Faisal Khalil
- (United Arab Emirates) Mohammad Omar
- (United Arab Emirates) Basheer Saeed
- (Yemen) Ali Alomki
- (Yemen) Ala Al-Sasi
- (Yemen) Mohammed Saleh
