= Basheer Saeed =

Emirati footballer (born 1981)

Personal information
- Full name: Basheer Saeed Sanqour Al Hammadi
- Date of birth: 27 June 1981 (age 45)
- Place of birth: Abu Dhabi, United Arab Emirates
- Height: 1.81 m (5 ft 11 in)
- Position: Center-back

Senior career*
Years	Team	Apps	(Gls)
1998–2011	Al-Wahda	152+	(16+)
2012–2015	Al-Ahli		
2015–2017	Al-Jazira		
2017–2018	Al Urooba		

International career^{‡}
2002–2012	United Arab Emirates	62	(7)
- * Club domestic league appearances and goals as of 10 December 2006 ‡ National team caps and goals as of 29 February 2012

Basheer Saeed Sanqour Al Hammadi (Arabic: بشير سعيد، من مواليد; born 27 June 1981) is a professional footballer who has represented the United Arab Emirates internationally. He also plays as a center defender.

== International goals ==
#	Date	Venue	Opponent	Score	Result	Competition
1	20 January 2007	Mohammed Bin Zayed Stadium, Abu Dhabi, United Arab Emirates	Yemen	2-0	2-1	18th Arabian Gulf Cup
2	8 October 2007	Mỹ Đình National Stadium, Hanoi, Vietnam	Vietnam	1-0	1-0	2010 FIFA World Cup qualification
3	6 September 2008	Mohammed Bin Zayed Stadium, Abu Dhabi, United Arab Emirates	North Korea	1-2	1-2	2010 FIFA World Cup qualification
4	29 February 2012	Al-Nahyan Stadium, Abu Dhabi, United Arab Emirates	Lebanon	1-0	4-2	2014 FIFA World Cup qualification
5	29 February 2012	Al-Nahyan Stadium, Abu Dhabi, United Arab Emirates	Lebanon	4-2	4-2	2014 FIFA World Cup qualification
