= Fawzi Bashir =

Omani footballer (born 1984)

Personal information
- Full name: Fawzi Bashir Rajab Bait Doorbeen
- Date of birth: 6 May 1984 (age 42)
- Place of birth: Salalah, Oman
- Height: 1.75 m (5 ft 9 in)
- Position: Attacking midfielder

Senior career*
Years	Team	Apps	(Gls)
1998–2004	Al-Nasr	?	(1)
2004–2005	Al-Ittifaq	?	(1)
2005–2006	Al-Wakra	?	(5)
2006–2007	Al-Qadisiya	?	(2)
2007–2008	Al-Gharafa	?	(5)
2008–2009	Kazma	?	(0)
2009–2012	Baniyas	52	(14)
2012–2013	Al-Dhafra	10	(3)
2013	Ajman	11	(0)
2013–2014	Dhofar	?	(1)

International career
2000–2013	Oman	152	(30)
- * Club domestic league appearances and goals

Fawzi Bashir Rajab Bait Doorbeen (Arabic: فوزي بشير رجب بيت دوربين; born 6 May 1984), commonly known as Fawzi Bashir, is an Omani former footballer who last played for Dhofar S.C.S.C. in Oman Professional League. He has also played for the Oman national team.

== Club career ==
He has previously played for various clubs in GCC countries like Ettifaq FC of KSA, Al-Wakrah Sport Club and Al-Gharafa Sports Club of Qatar, Qadsia SC and Kazma Sporting Club of Kuwait and Baniyas SC, Al-Dhafra Club and Ajman Club of UAE. On 1 October 2013, he signed a six-month contract with Dhofar S.C.S.C.

== International career ==
He has been an active member of the senior national team since the early turn of the millennium. Fawzi has been a very key player for the Oman national team, as well as his clubs in play making and scoring. He joined the national team at a very young age of 17 and from the very beginning was a member of the starting line-up. Bashir had held the number 10 shirt since 2001 as well. He was part of the first team squad of the Oman national football team till 2013. Fawzi was selected for the national team for the first time in 2001.

=== Arabian Gulf Cup ===
Fawzi has made appearances in the 16th Arabian Gulf Cup, the 17th Arabian Gulf Cup, the 18th Arabian Gulf Cup, the 19th Arabian Gulf Cup, the 20th Arabian Gulf Cup and the 21st Arabian Gulf Cup.

He first showed his talent during the 16th Arabian Gulf Cup in 2003–04, scoring two goals, one in a 1-1 draw against Yemen and another in a 2-0 win over Qatar. In the tournament, Oman finished at the fourth place, hence reaching its best ever position in the Arabian Gulf Cup competition, reaching the final four round for the first time, with eight points from two wins and two draws.

In the 18th Arabian Gulf Cup in 2007, he scored one goal in a 2-1 win over the hosts the United Arab Emirates in the Group stage. This was the second time when Oman reached to the finals but again they lost to the hosts, the United Arab Emirates. Ismail Matar, the Emirati legend, scored the lone goal of the match as United Arab Emirates won their first ever Arabian Gulf Cup.

Finally in 2009, he helped his team to win their first ever Arabian Gulf Cup trophy. He scored one goal in the 19th Arabian Gulf Cup in a 2-0 win over Bahrain.

In the 21st Arabian Gulf Cup in 2013, he made two appearances as the captain of the team but failed to score a single goal. Oman again could score only one goal and this time it was from the spot by youngster Hussain Al-Hadhri against Qatar which Oman eventually lost 2-1. Oman failed to qualify for the semi-finals.

=== AFC Asian Cup ===
Fawzi has made appearances in the 2004 AFC Asian Cup qualification, the 2004 AFC Asian Cup, the 2007 AFC Asian Cup qualification, the 2007 AFC Asian Cup, the 2011 AFC Asian Cup qualification and has also represented the national team in the 2015 AFC Asian Cup qualification.

He scored six goals in the 2004 AFC Asian Cup qualification, a brace in a 7-0 win over Nepal, a hat-trick in a 6-0 win over Nepal and another in a 3-1 win over South Korea hence helping his team to qualify for the 2004 AFC Asian Cup. In the tournament, Oman won four points in a 2-0 win over Thailand and a 2-2 draw against Iran and hence failed to qualify for the quarter-finals.

In the 2007 AFC Asian Cup qualification, he scored a brace in a 5-0 win over Pakistan. Badar Al-Maimani scored one and the only goal of Oman in the 2007 AFC Asian Cup in a 1-1 draw against Australia. In the tournament, Oman won two points in two points in a 1-1 draw against Australia and in a 0-0 draw against Iraq and hence failed to qualify for the quarter-finals.

In the 2011 AFC Asian Cup qualification, he scored one goal in a 2-1 win over Indonesia. Oman failed to qualify for the 2011 AFC Asian Cup.

=== FIFA World Cup qualification ===
Fawzi has made thirteen appearances in the 2002 FIFA World Cup qualification, six in the 2006 FIFA World Cup qualification, seven in the 2010 FIFA World Cup qualification and eleven in the 2014 FIFA World Cup qualification.

His only goal for Oman in FIFA World Cup qualification matches came in the first round of 2010 FIFA World Cup qualification in a 2-0 win over Nepal.

=== Retirement ===
In February 2013, soon after the 21st Arabian Gulf Cup Bashir announced his retirement from national duty. Basheer and Oman's coach Paul Le Guen were reported to have started drifting apart nearly a year and a half ago when the Frenchman replaced the midfielder with Ali Al Habsi as captain during the World Cup qualifying match against Australia late in 2011. Media reports suggested fresh differences between the two after a friendly against Togo in late 2012 which Oman lost 0-1.

== Career statistics ==
=== Club ===
Club	Season	Division	League		Cup		Continental (Note: Includes appearances in the AFC Champions League and AFC Cup)		Other		Total	
Club	Season	Division	Apps	Goals	Apps	Goals	Apps	Goals	Apps	Goals	Apps	Goals
Al-Nasr	2003–04	Omani League	-	1	-	0	0	0	-	0	-	1
Al-Nasr	Total		-	1	-	0	0	0	-	0	-	1
Al-Ittifaq	2004–05	Saudi Premier League	-	1	-	0	0	0	-	0	-	1
Al-Ittifaq	Total		-	1	-	0	0	0	-	0	-	1
Al-Wakra	2005–06	Qatar Stars League	-	5	-	0	0	0	-	0	-	5
Al-Wakra	Total		-	5	-	0	0	0	-	0	-	5
Al-Qadisiya	2006–07	Kuwaiti Premier League	-	2	-	1	-	2	-	0	-	3
Al-Qadisiya	Total		-	2	-	1	-	2	-	0	-	3
Al-Gharafa	2007–08	Qatar Stars League	-	5	-	1	0	0	-	0	-	6
Al-Gharafa	Total		-	5	-	1	0	0	-	0	-	6
Kazma	2008–09	Kuwaiti Premier League	-	0	-	1	0	0	-	0	-	1
Kazma	Total		-	0	-	1	0	0	-	0	-	1
Baniyas	2009–10	UAE Pro League	12	5	-	1	0	0	0	0	-	6
Baniyas	2010–11	UAE Pro League	21	7	-	2	0	0	0	0	-	9
Baniyas	2011–12	UAE Pro League	19	2	6	0	6	1	0	0	31	3
Baniyas	Total		52	14	-	3	6	1	0	0	-	18
Al-Dhafra	2012–13	UAE Pro League	10	3	0	0	0	0	0	0	10	3
Al-Dhafra	Total		10	3	0	0	0	0	0	0	10	3
Ajman	2013–14	UAE Arabian Gulf League	11	0	3	0	0	0	0	0	14	0
Ajman	Total		11	0	3	0	0	0	0	0	14	0
Dhofar	2013–14	Oman Professional League	-	1	-	2	0	0	0	0	-	3
Dhofar	Total		-	1	-	2	0	0	0	0	-	3
Career total			-	32	-	8	6	3	-	0	-	41

=== International ===
Appearances and goals by national team and year
National team	Year	Apps	Goals
Oman	2000	2	0
Oman	2001	19	6
Oman	2002	6	0
Oman	2003	14	12
Oman	2004	23	2
Oman	2005	1	0
Oman	2006	8	2
Oman	2007	13	3
Oman	2008	16	2
Oman	2009	16	2
Oman	2010	10	1
Oman	2011	12	0
Oman	2012	10	0
Oman	2013	2	0
Total		152	30

Scores and results list Oman's goal tally first, score column indicates score after each Bashir goal.

List of international goals scored by Fawzi Bashir
No.	Date	Venue	Opponent	Score	Result	Competition
1	30 April 2001	Sultan Qaboos Sports Complex, Muscat, Oman	Laos	10–0	12–0	2002 FIFA World Cup qualification
2	30 April 2001	Sultan Qaboos Sports Complex, Muscat, Oman	Laos	12–0	12–0	2002 FIFA World Cup qualification
3	29 July 2001	Sultan Qaboos Sports Complex, Muscat, Oman	Iraq	1–0	1–0	Friendly
4	8 August 2001	Azadi Stadium, Tehran, Iran	Iran	2–4	2–5	2001 LG Cup
5	13 October 2001	Sultan Qaboos Sports Complex, Muscat, Oman	Uzbekistan	2–2	4–2	2002 FIFA World Cup qualification
6	30 December 2001	Sultan Qaboos Sports Complex, Muscat, Oman	Macedonia	1–0	2–0	Friendly
7	10 September 2003	Sultan Qaboos Sports Complex, Muscat, Oman	Bahrain	1–0	1–0	Friendly
8	16 September 2003	Bishan Stadium, Bishan, Singapore	Singapore	1–0	3–1	Friendly
9	16 September 2003	Bishan Stadium, Bishan, Singapore	Singapore	3–1	3–1	Friendly
10	25 September 2003	Incheon Munhak Stadium, Incheon, South Korea	Nepal	1–0	7–0	2004 AFC Asian Cup qualification
11	25 September 2003	Incheon Munhak Stadium, Incheon, South Korea	Nepal	5–0	7–0	2004 AFC Asian Cup qualification
12	29 September 2003	Incheon Munhak Stadium, Incheon, South Korea	Vietnam	1–0	2–2	2004 AFC Asian Cup qualification
13	29 September 2003	Incheon Munhak Stadium, Incheon, South Korea	Vietnam	5–0	2–2	2004 AFC Asian Cup qualification
14	19 October 2003	Sultan Qaboos Sports Complex, Muscat, Oman	Nepal	1–0	6–0	2004 AFC Asian Cup qualification
15	19 October 2003	Sultan Qaboos Sports Complex, Muscat, Oman	Nepal	4–0	6–0	2004 AFC Asian Cup qualification
16	19 October 2003	Sultan Qaboos Sports Complex, Muscat, Oman	Nepal	6–0	6–0	2004 AFC Asian Cup qualification
17	21 October 2003	Sultan Qaboos Sports Complex, Muscat, Oman	South Korea	3–1	3–1	2004 AFC Asian Cup qualification
18	28 December 2003	Al Kuwait Sports Club Stadium, Kuwait City, Kuwait	Yemen	1–1	1–1	16th Arabian Gulf Cup
19	11 January 2004	Al-Sadaqua Walsalam Stadium, Kuwait City, Kuwait	Qatar	1–0	2–0	16th Arabian Gulf Cup
20	30 June 2004	Sultan Qaboos Sports Complex, Muscat, Oman	Maldives	4–0	4–1	Friendly
21	6 September 2006	Sultan Qaboos Sports Complex, Muscat, Oman	Pakistan	2–0	5–0	2007 AFC Asian Cup qualification
22	6 September 2006	Sultan Qaboos Sports Complex, Muscat, Oman	Pakistan	4–0	5–0	2007 AFC Asian Cup qualification
23	17 January 2007	Zayed Sports City Stadium, Abu Dhabi, United Arab Emirates	United Arab Emirates	1–0	2–1	18th Arabian Gulf Cup
24	1 July 2007	Jurong West Stadium, Jurong West, Singapore	Saudi Arabia	1–1	1–1	Friendly
25	8 October 2007	Sultan Qaboos Sports Complex, Muscat, Oman	Nepal	1–0	2–0	2010 FIFA World Cup qualification
26	20 August 2008	Royal Oman Police Stadium, Muscat, Oman	Uzbekistan	1–0	2–0	Friendly
27	17 December 2008	Sultan Qaboos Sports Complex, Muscat, Oman	China	2–1	3–1	Friendly
28	10 January 2009	Sultan Qaboos Sports Complex, Muscat, Oman	Bahrain	2–0	2–0	19th Arabian Gulf Cup
29	31 December 2009	Bishan Stadium, Bishan, Singapore	Singapore	1–0	4–1	Friendly
30	6 January 2010	Gelora Bung Karno Stadium, Jakarta, Indonesia	Indonesia	1–0	2–1	2011 AFC Asian Cup qualification

== Honours ==
- With Al-Nasr

- Omani League (1): 2003-2004; Runner-up 1998–99, 1999–2000
- Sultan Qaboos Cup (2): 2000, 2002; Runner-up 1999, 2001
- Omani Super Cup (0): Runner-up 2002

- With Al-Qadisiya

- Kuwait Crown Prince Cup (1): 2006
- Kuwait Emir Cup (1): 2007; Runner-up 2006

- With Al-Gharrafa

- Qatar Stars League (1): 2007–2008
- Sheikh Jassem Cup (1): 2007
- Qatar Crown Prince Cup (0): Runner-up 2007

- With Bani Yas

- UAE President's Cup (0): Runner-up 2011–12

- With Ajman

- Etisalat Emirates Cup (1): 2012–13

Oman

- Arabian Gulf Cup:
  - Winners: 2009
  - Runner-up: 2004, 2007

== See also ==
- List of men's footballers with 100 or more international caps
