= Mohamed Rashid Srour =

Emirati footballer (born 1978)

Personal information
- Full name: Mohamed Rashid Mohamed Ali Srour Al Naqbi
- Date of birth: 28 September 1978 (age 48)
- Place of birth: Dubai, United Arab Emirates
- Height: 1.84 m (6 ft 0 in)
- Position: Striker

Youth career
- –2000: Al-Hisn

Senior career*
Years	Team	Apps	(Gls)
2000–2001	Al-Hisn		
2001–2005	Al-Shaab		(33)
2006	FC Thun	0	(0)
2006–2010	Al Ahli		(7)
2010	→ Al Jazira (loan)	3	(0)
2010–2012	Sharjah	27	(4)
2012–2013	Dibba Al Fujairah		
2013–2017	Dibba Al Hisn		

International career
2002–2009	United Arab Emirates	28	(9)
- * Club domestic league appearances and goals

Mohamed Rashid Mohamed Ali Srour Al Naqbi (Arabic: محمد راشد محمد علي سرور النقبي; born 28 September 1978) is an Emirati former footballer who played as a striker. He represented the United Arab Emirates in the 2004 AFC Asian Cup.

== International goals ==
No.	Date	Venue	Opponent	Score	Result	Competition
1.	19 July 2004	Shandong Sports Center, Jinan, China	Kuwait	1–3	1–3	2004 AFC Asian Cup
