= Yasser Nazmi =

Qatari footballer (born 1973)

Personal information
- Date of birth: 23 September 1973 (age 53)
- Place of birth: Qatar
- Position: Midfielder

Youth career
- Al Nasr

Senior career*
Years	Team	Apps	(Gls)
1992–2002	Qatar SC	-	(-)
2002–2003	Al-Rayyan SC	-	(-)
2003–2007	Qatar SC	-	(-)

International career
1996–2003	Qatar	70	(10)
- * Club domestic league appearances and goals

Yasser Nazmi is a Qatari football midfielder who played for Qatar in the 2000 Asian Cup. He also played for Qatar SC and Al Rayyan. He is the current assistant coach of the Qatar U17 team.

== Career ==
He started his career in the youth teams of Al Nasr before moving to Qatar SC. He made his first team debut in 1992, under Džemaludin Mušović. He officially retired in 2007, taking up a job as a coach.

He earned over 80 caps and scored 10 goals for the Qatar national team.
