= Faisal Khalil =

Emirati footballer (born 1982)

Personal information
- Full name: Faisal Khalil Sebait Mubarak Al-Junaibi
- Date of birth: 4 December 1982 (age 43)
- Place of birth: Sharjah, UAE
- Height: 1.77 m (5 ft 10 in)
- Position: Forward

Youth career
- 1996–1999: Al-Ahli

Senior career*
Years	Team	Apps	(Gls)
1999–2006	Al-Ahli	126	(82)
2006	LB Châteauroux	0	(0)
2006–2013	Al-Ahli	82	(28)
2012–2013	→ Al Wasl (loan)	3	(0)
2013	→ Al-Shaab (loan)	9	(2)
2019–2022	Al-Hamriyah	48	(6)

International career^{‡}
2002–2008	UAE	67	(15)
- * Club domestic league appearances and goals as of 17:56, 6/12/2022 (UTC) ‡ National team caps and goals as of 09:49, 6/12/2022 (UTC)

Faisal Khalil Al-Junaibi (Arabic: فيصل خليل سبيت مبارك الجنيبي; born 4 December 1982) is an Emirati footballer who formerly played as a centre forward formerly for the UAE national football team.

== Club career ==
=== Al Ahli ===
==== 2009–10 ====
Faisal did not play this season because of an injury he suffered in the final of the Super Cup on September 23, 2009, between Al Ain FC and Al Ahli which lost on penalties.

On 8 February 2010, Faisal said that he would move to one of the top teams soon (Al Ain, Al Wahda, Al Jazira), and that his contract with Al Ahli expired that season. Al Ahli stated that he did not have the right to negotiate with any other club since his contract was to expire the following year.

On 18 August 2010, Faisal Khalil renewed his contract with Al Ahli and said: " This Period i have witnessed that some of the gossip is not true in the media in general and the boards and forums about the sports player Faisal Khalil and non-renewal with Al Ahli and are not official sources "and he continued," that the renewal of Faisal today with the Al Ahli is a response to skeptics." Mr Hamad Al Ahli Club's Manager says "In the process and negotiate with the player and sign him did not take a lot of time and there was a genuine desire from Faisal for renewal, and a sincere desire of the Governing Council to take into account the player's future and preserve their rights, "and" there is still al-Ahli club house is great sons who nursed and taught him from a young age and instilled in them a love theme, jealousy and loyalty to the fans of the great public, which commutes stars all the love and appreciation. " Faisal Khalil Continues and Says "The public who was seen by Faisal look wrong that they will change it, the question of renewal was a matter of time this is for illustration only, "said Faisal," I am like a fish can not live out of water in a reference that he can not live outside the walls of the Red Castle " He drew Faisal message to the Al Ahli Public at the end of his Renewal "Faisal is in the home and between a quarter and his brothers and loved ones, and I are not described today, and will keep working our players as a group to make them happy and the introduction of joy in themselves, victories and complete joy when he announced an end to my career in football with the horsemen."

== Honours ==
=== Individual ===
- Sheikh Majid Football Season Award best Emirati player : 2007/2008
- UAE League Top Scorer : 2007/2008

=== Club ===
Al Ahli FC

- UAE League: 2005/2006, 2008/2009.
- UAE President Cup: 2002, 2004, 2008.

=== International ===
United Arab Emirates

- Arabian Gulf Cup: 2007
