= Nawaf Mubarak =

Emirati footballer (born 1981)

Personal information
- Full name: Nawaf Mubarak Al-Darmaki
- Date of birth: 31 August 1981 (age 45)
- Place of birth: United Arab Emirates
- Position: Winger

Senior career*
Years	Team	Apps	(Gls)
1998–2011	Al-Sharjah SC	21	(12)
2011–2014	Baniyas Club	39	(21)
2014–2015	Al Ahli		
2015–2017	Al-Sharjah SC		
2017–2018	Al Urooba		

International career
2004–2009	United Arab Emirates	49	(6)
- * Club domestic league appearances and goals

Nawaf Mubarak Al-Darmaki (Arabic: نواف مبارك الدرمكي; born 31 August 1981) is an Emirati football defender who played for United Arab Emirates in the 2004 Asian Cup. He also played for Al Sharjah and Bani Yas.
