= Fahed Masoud =

Emirati association football player (born 1980)

Fahed Masoud فهد مسعود
Personal information
- Full name: Fahed Masoud Ali Al-Junaibi
- Date of birth: 31 December 1980 (age 45)
- Place of birth: Abu Dhabi, United Arab Emirates
- Height: 1.67 m (5 ft 6 in)
- Positions: Right-back; wing-back

Youth career
- Al-Wahda

Senior career*
| Years | Team | Apps | (Gls) |
| 1999–2012 | Al-Wahda | | |
| 2007–2008 | → Qatar SC (loan) | | |
| 2011–2012 | → Al-Wasl (loan) | | |

International career
| 2001–2010 | United Arab Emirates | 48 | (6) |
- * Club domestic league appearances and goals

Fahed Masoud (Arabic: فهد مسعود) (born 31 December 1980) is an Emirati footballer. He currently plays as a right back or wing back .

== Career ==
He formerly played for Al-Wahda, Qatar SC, Al-Wasl, and United Arab Emirates national team.
