= Abdulrahman Ibrahim =

Emirati footballer (born 1974)

Personal information
- Full name: Abdulrahman Ibrahim Al Mazem
- Date of birth: 9 November 1974 (age 51)
- Place of birth: United Arab Emirates
- Positions: Centre back; defender

Senior career*
Years	Team	Apps	(Gls)
1995–2008	Al-Shaab Club	?	(?)
2008–2011	Ajman Club		

International career
1996–2002	UAE	13	(2)
- * Club domestic league appearances and goals

Abdulrahman Ibrahim (born 9 November 1974) is a former Emirati footballer. He played as center-back and was considered one of the best defenders in the UAE League. He was one of the favourite defenders to be selected for the different U.A.E. national teams (Youth, Olympic and Men).

Ibrahim is praised for his remarkable long-range golden goal against Iraq in the quarterfinals of the 1996 AFC Asian Cup held in the UAE.
