= Yaser Salem Ali =

Emirati footballer (born 1977)

Personal information
- Full name: Yaser Salem Salah Ali
- Date of birth: 5 December 1977 (age 48)
- Place of birth: United Arab Emirates
- Position: Forward

Senior career*
Years	Team	Apps	(Gls)
1995–2005	Al Wahda		(36+)
2005–2006	Baniyas		
Total			(36+)

International career
1997	United Arab Emirates U20		(1)
1997–2002	United Arab Emirates	36	(16)
- * Club domestic league appearances and goals

Yaser Salem Salah Ali (Arabic: ياسر سالم صلاح علي; born 5 December 1977) is an Emirati retired footballer who played as a forward for Emirati clubs Al Wahda and Baniyas. He earned 36 caps for the United Arab Emirates national team, scoring 16 goals. Ali scored 10 goals in the 2002 FIFA World Cup qualifying campaign and also appeared at the 1997 FIFA Confederations Cup.
