= Abdulsalam Jumaa =

Emirati footballer (born 1977)

Abdulsalaam Jumaa
Personal information
- Full name: Abdul Salam Jumaa Al Junaibi
- Date of birth: 23 May 1977 (age 49)
- Place of birth: Abu Dhabi, UAE
- Height: 1.72 m (5 ft 8 in)
- Position: Defensive midfielder

Youth career
- Al-Wahda

Senior career*
Years	Team	Apps	(Gls)
1997–2007	Al-Wahda		(4)
2007–2012	Al-Jazira		(3)
2012–2016	Al Dhafra		

International career
1997–2010	UAE	112	(7)
- * Club domestic league appearances and goals as of September 25, 2009

Abdulsalam Jumaa Al Junaibi (born 23 May 1977) is an Emirati former footballer who is a midfielder for Al Dhafra. He is a member of the United Arab Emirates national football team.

== See also ==
- List of men's footballers with 100 or more international caps
