= Sultan Rashed =

Emirati footballer (born 1976)

Sultan Rashed (born 5 December 1976) is an Emirati football midfielder who played for United Arab Emirates in the 2004 AFC Asian Cup.
