= Maktoum bin Rashid Al Maktoum Stadium =

Stadium in Dubai, United Arab Emirates

Coordinates: 25°17′27″N 55°20′54″E

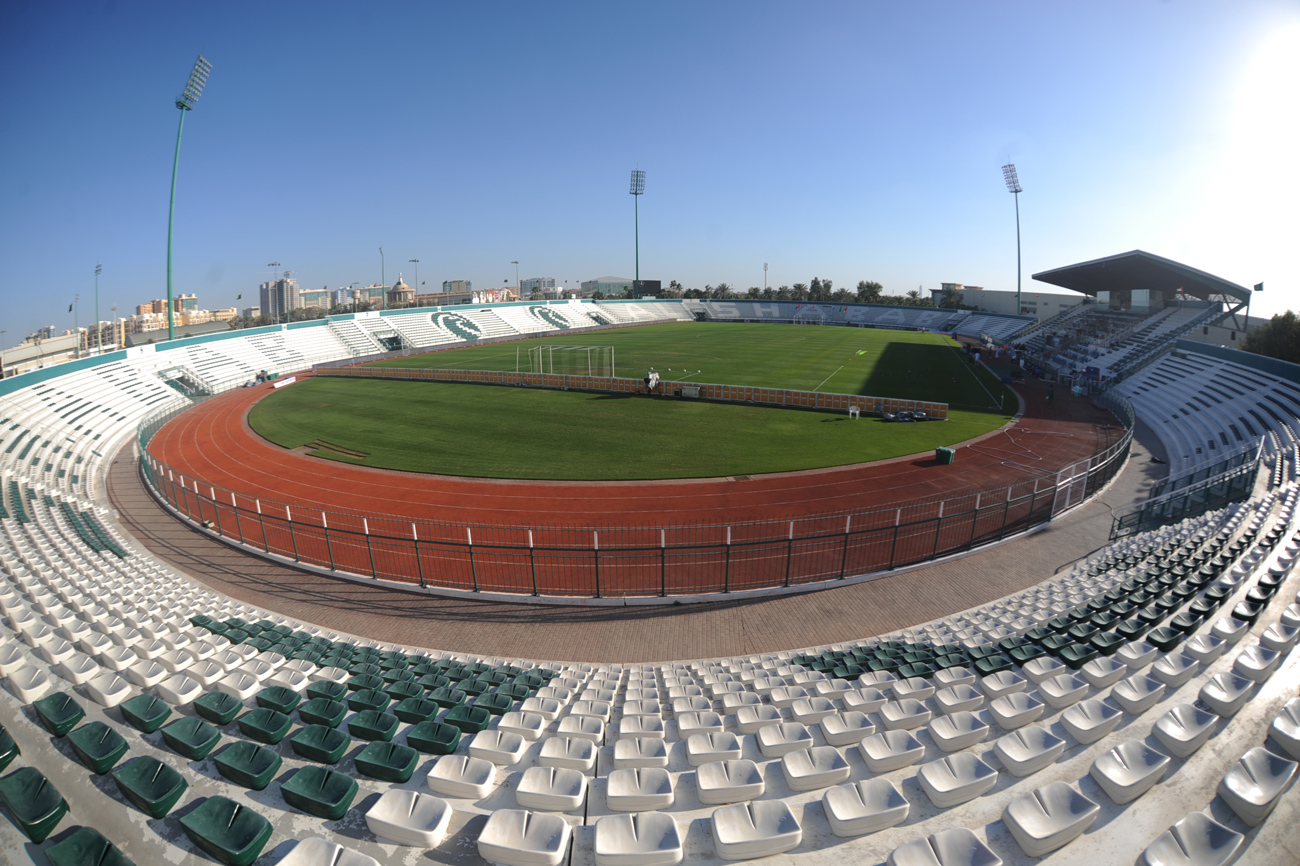
- Interior of the stadium in 2016
- Interactive map of Maktoum bin Rashid Al Maktoum Stadium
- Full name: Maktoum bin Rashid Al Maktoum Stadium
- Location: Al Mamzar Dubai, United Arab Emirates
- Capacity: 12,000
- Surface: Grass

Construction
- Built: Built in 1978, Al Maktoum Stadium underwent a comprehensive renovation and reopened in 2019.
- Opened: 1978

Tenants
- Al Shabab (1978–2017); Shabab Al Ahli (2017–present)

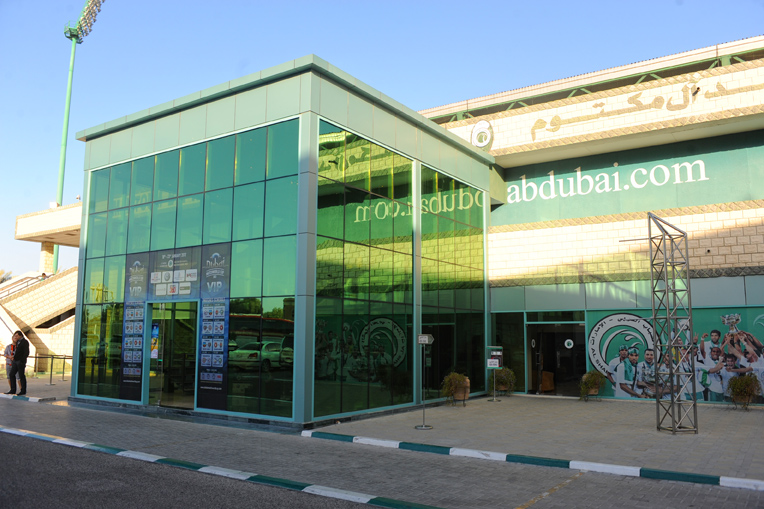
Maktoum bin Rashid Al Maktoum Stadium 3

Maktoum bin Rashid Al Maktoum Stadium (Arabic: ملعب مكتوم بن راشد آل مكتوم) is a multi-use stadium in Dubai, United Arab Emirates. It was named after Sheikh Maktoum bin Rashid Al Maktoum. It is currently used mostly for football matches and serves as the home stadium of former home Al Shabab Al Arabi Club of the UAE Pro League, but after Al Shabab merged with Al Ahli and Dubai to form Shabab Al-Ahli Club, it became a secondary stadium to Shabab Al Ahli. The stadium holds 12,000 spectators.
