= Tahnoun bin Mohammed Stadium =

Stadium in Al Ain, United Arab Emirates

Coordinates: 24°16′06″N 55°45′23″E

Tahnoun Bin Mohamed Stadium
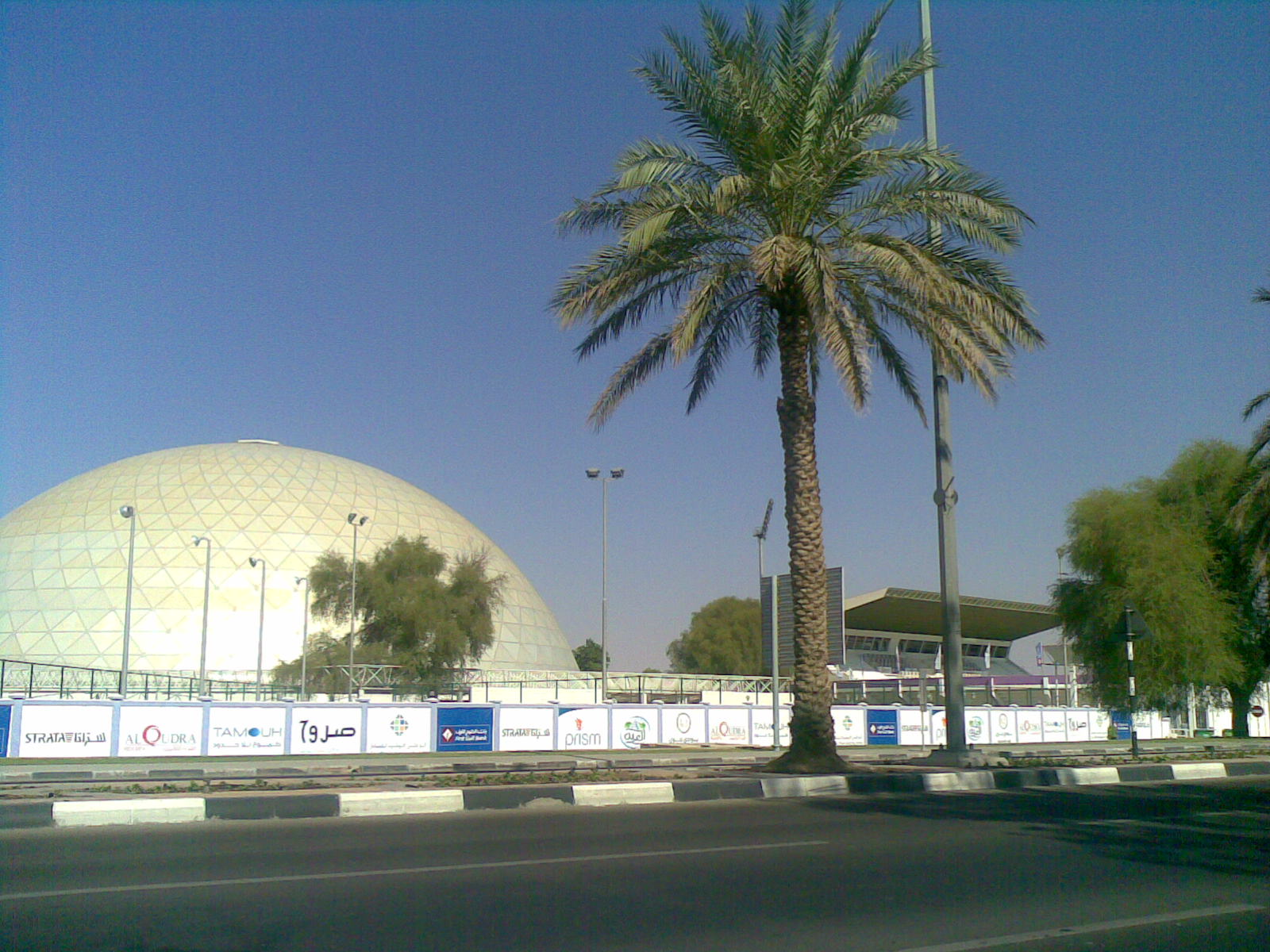
- Interactive map of Tahnoun Bin Mohamed Stadium
- Full name: Tahnoun Bin Mohamed Stadium
- Capacity: 15,000
- Surface: Grass

Construction
- Opened: 21 August 1987

Tahnoun Bin Mohamed Stadium (Arabic: استاد طحنون بن محمد) is a multi-purpose stadium in Al Ain, United Arab Emirates. It is currently used mostly for football matches and is one of the home grounds of Al Ain Club. The stadium holds approximately 15,000 people and was opened on 21 August 1987. This stadium played host to two AFC Champions League final matches one in 2003 and in 2005.
