= Bahrain national football team results (2000–2009) =

This article provides details of international football games played by the Bahrain national team from 2000 to 2009.

== Results ==
Key
Win
Draw
Defeat

=== 2000 ===
20 March 2000 Friendly	Bahrain	0–1	Kazakhstan	Manama, Bahrain
			Avdeyev	Stadium: Al Ahli Stadium

22 March 2000 Friendly	Bahrain	1–0	Qatar	United Arab Emirates

22 March 2000 Friendly	Kazakhstan	2–0	Bahrain	Abu-Dhabi, United Arab Emirates
				Stadium: Zayed Sports City Stadium

25 March 2000 Friendly	Bahrain	1–1	Jordan	United Arab Emirates

31 March 2000 2000 AFC Asian Cup qualification	Syria	1–0	Bahrain	Aleppo, Syria
	Taleb 64'			Stadium: Al-Hamadaniah Stadium

2 April 2000 2000 AFC Asian Cup qualification	Bahrain	4–1	Maldives	Aleppo, Syria
	Sahinni 2', 43'; Jaffer 55', 59'		Izema Katu Mohamed 83'	Stadium: Al-Hamadaniah Stadium

4 April 2000 2000 AFC Asian Cup qualification	Bahrain	1–0	Iran	Aleppo, Syria
	Mohammad Salman 17'			Stadium: Al-Hamadaniah Stadium

7 April 2000 2000 AFC Asian Cup qualification	Iran	3–0	Bahrain	Tehran, Iran
	Fekri 57'; Karimi 72'; Daei 82'			Stadium: Azadi Stadium

9 April 2000 2000 AFC Asian Cup qualification	Maldives	0–1	Bahrain	Tehran, Iran
			Wahab 47'	Stadium: Azadi Stadium

11 April 2000 2000 AFC Asian Cup qualification	Bahrain	0–1	Syria	Tehran, Iran
			Haj Moustafa 24'	Stadium: Azadi Stadium

9 August 2000 Friendly tournament	Syria	1–0	Bahrain	Syria

11 August 2000 Friendly tournament	Jordan	2–0	Bahrain	Syria

21 November 2000 Friendly	Oman	2–1	Bahrain	Oman

=== 2001 ===
3 February 2001 2002 World Cup qualification	Bahrain	1–2	Kuwait	National Stadium, Singapore
18:00 UTC+08	Al Sadi 90'	Report	Al Huwaidi 66'; Al-Sauhi 72'	Attendance: 25,000; Referee: Kim Hoe Sung (South Korea)

6 February 2001 2002 World Cup qualification	Bahrain	1–0	Kyrgyzstan	National Stadium, Singapore
18:00 UTC+08	Al Sadi 86'	Report		Attendance: 1,000; Referee: Kazuhiko Matsumura (Japan)

9 February 2001 2002 World Cup qualification	Singapore	1–2	Bahrain	National Stadium, Singapore
20:00 UTC+08	Ali 65'	Report	Al Sadi 15', 25'	Attendance: 25,000; Referee: Kazuhiko Matsumura (Japan)

21 February 2001 2002 World Cup qualification	Kyrgyzstan	1–2	Bahrain	Kuwait National Stadium, Kuwait City
16:45 UTC+03	Jumagulov 8'	Report	Salmeen 23'; Hassan 74'	Attendance: 1,099; Referee: Park Sang-Gu (South Korea)

24 February 2001 2002 World Cup qualification	Bahrain	2–0	Singapore	Kuwait National Stadium, Kuwait City
19:00 UTC+03	Eid 40'; Al Sadi 43'	Report		Attendance: 800; Referee: Youssuf Al Aqily (Saudi Arabia)

27 February 2001 2002 World Cup qualification	Kuwait	0–1	Bahrain	Kuwait National Stadium, Kuwait City
19:00 UTC+03		Report	Mohammed 72'	Attendance: 18,000; Referee: Zhang Yeduan (China)

4 April 2001 Friendly	Lebanon	1–1	Bahrain	Beirut, Lebanon

16 April 2001 Friendly	Bahrain	0–1	Oman	Bahrain

21 June 2001 Merdeka Cup 2001	Malaysia	2–4	Bahrain	Kuala Lumpur, Malaysia
20:30	Abdul Ghani Malik 25'; Gilbert Cassidy Gawing 52'		Talal Yusuf 3'; Hussain Ali Ahmed 70', 85', 90'	Stadium: Stadium Merdeka

23 June 2001 Merdeka Cup 2001	Bahrain	0–1	Bosnia and Herzegovina	Kuala Lumpur, Malaysia
		Report	Kulenović 38'	Stadium: Stadium Merdeka; Attendance: 4,000; Referee: Halid Abdul Hamid (Malaysia)

25 June 2001 Merdeka Cup 2001	Bahrain	2–0	Slovakia	Kuala Lumpur, Malaysia
18:30	Rashed Jamal 35', 66'			Stadium: Stadium Merdeka

28 June 2001 Merdeka Cup 2001	Uzbekistan	2–0	Bahrain	Kuala Lumpur, Malaysia
	Bakhodir Seytkamalov 89', 90'	Report		Stadium: Shah Alam; Attendance: 30,000

10 August 2001 Friendly	Qatar	1–1	Bahrain	Qatar

17 August 2001 2002 World Cup qualification	Saudi Arabia	1–1	Bahrain	Riyadh, Saudi Arabia
20:30 UTC+03	Al-Dosari 84'	Report	Salmeen 18'	Stadium: Prince Faisal bin Fahd Stadium; Attendance: 45,000; Referee: Saad Kamil Al-Fadhli (Kuwait)

23 August 2001 2002 World Cup qualification	Bahrain	2–0	Iraq	Manama, Bahrain
18:30 UTC+03	Yousef 58'; Al Kuwari 82'	Report		Stadium: Bahrain National Stadium; Attendance: 35,000; Referee: Khaled Dalu (Syria)

6 September 2001 2002 World Cup qualification	Bahrain	1–1	Thailand	Bahrain National Stadium, Manama
18:30 UTC+03	Al-Dossari 16'	Report	Senamuang 64'	Attendance: 35,000; Referee: Kim Tae-Young (South Korea)

14 September 2001 2002 World Cup qualification	Iran	0–0	Bahrain	Azadi Stadium, Tehran
17:30 UTC+04:30		Report		Attendance: 50,000; Referee: Subkhiddin Mohd Salleh (Malaysia)

21 September 2001 2002 World Cup qualification	Bahrain	0–4	Saudi Arabia	Bahrain National Stadium, Manama
18:30 UTC+03		Report	Al-Dosari 26'; Bin Shehan 28'; Al-Waked 41'; Al-Jaber 89'	Attendance: 35,000; Referee: Ali Bujsaim (United Arab Emirates)

28 September 2001 2002 World Cup qualification	Iraq	1–0	Bahrain	Al-Shaab Stadium, Baghdad
20:00 UTC+04	E. Mohammed 10'	Report		Attendance: 15,000; Referee: Kim Young-Joo (South Korea)

5 October 2001 Friendly	Bahrain	1–0	Qatar	Bahrain

16 October 2001^{1} 2002 World Cup qualification	Thailand	1–1	Bahrain	Rajamangala Stadium, Bangkok
15:30 UTC+07	Srimaka 21'	Report	Ali 90+3'	Attendance: 20,000; Referee: Halim Abdul Hamid (Malaysia)

21 October 2001 2002 World Cup qualification	Bahrain	3–1	Iran	Bahrain National Stadium, Manama
20:30 UTC+03	Al Marzooqi 8'; Ali 45'; Husain 90'	Report	Daei 82'	Attendance: 25,000; Referee: Carlos Batres (Guatemala)

13 December 2001 Friendly	Bahrain	2–2	Oman	Bahrain

=== 2002 ===
4 January 2002 Bahrain Shoot Soccer Tournament	Bahrain	0–2	Finland	Riffa, Bahrain
		Report	Kottila 44'; Wiss 81'	Stadium: Bahrain National Stadium; Attendance: 5,000; Referee: Jassim Al Hail (Qatar)

7 January 2002 Bahrain Shoot Soccer Tournament	Bahrain	1–1	Macedonia	Manama, Bahrain
20:15	Salmeen 12'	Report	Siljanoski 40'	Stadium: Bahrain National Stadium; Attendance: 4,000; Referee: Jassim Abdul Karim (Bahrain)

10 January 2002 Bahrain Shoot Soccer Tournament	Bahrain	3–0	Albania	Riffa, Bahrain
	Salem 42'; Salman 63', 72'	Report		Stadium: Bahrain National Stadium; Attendance: 10,000; Referee: Qasim Shaaban (Bahrain)

17 January 2002 2002 Gulf Cup	Qatar	1–0	Bahrain	Saudi Arabia

20 January 2002 2002 Gulf Cup	Saudi Arabia	3–1	Bahrain	Saudi Arabia

22 January 2002 2002 Gulf Cup	Kuwait	0–0	Bahrain	Saudi Arabia

27 January 2002 2002 Gulf Cup	United Arab Emirates	1–2	Bahrain	Saudi Arabia

30 January 2002 2002 Gulf Cup	Bahrain	1–1	Oman	Saudi Arabia

23 November 2002 Friendly	Bahrain	2–2	Iraq	Qatar

7 December 2002 Friendly tournament	Bahrain	0–3	Jordan	Bahrain

9 December 2002 Friendly tournament	Bahrain	2–3	Syria	Bahrain

12 December 2002 Friendly tournament	Bahrain	2–2	China	Bahrain

17 December 2002 2002 Arab Cup	Saudi Arabia	2–1	Bahrain	Al Kuwait Sports Club Stadium, Kuwait City
	Al-Obaili 33'; Al-Meshal 71'	Report	Yousef 44'	Attendance: 7,000; Referee: Mohamed Guezzaz (Morocco)

19 December 2002 2002 Arab Cup	Bahrain	2–0	Syria	Al Kuwait Sports Club Stadium, Kuwait City
	Hassan 82'; Al-Dosari 90' (pen.)			Referee: Qassem Hamza (Kuwait)

21 December 2002 2002 Arab Cup	Bahrain	3–1	Yemen	Al Kuwait Sports Club Stadium, Kuwait City
	Hassan 45', 83', 90'		Al-Salimi 89'	Attendance: 1,000; Referee: Ridha Al-Baltaji (Egypt)

26 December 2002 2002 Arab Cup	Lebanon	0–0	Bahrain	Al Kuwait Sports Club Stadium, Kuwait City
				Attendance: 1,000; Referee: Hisham Qirat (Tunisia)

28 December 2002 2002 Arab Cup	Bahrain	2–1 (a.e.t.)	Jordan	Al Kuwait Sports Club Stadium, Kuwait City
	Ali 79', 91'		Al-Zboun 43'	Attendance: 2,000; Referee: Qassem Hamza (Kuwait)

30 December 2002 2002 Arab Cup	Saudi Arabia	1–0 (a.e.t.)	Bahrain	Al Kuwait Sports Club Stadium, Kuwait City
	Noor 94'	Report		Attendance: 7,500; Referee: Mohamed Zekrini (Algeria)

=== 2003 ===
10 September 2003 Friendly	Oman	1–0	Bahrain	Oman

19 September 2003 Friendly	Bahrain	4–3	Lebanon	Manama, Bahrain

26 September 2003 Friendly	United Arab Emirates	1–4	Bahrain	United Arab Emirates

8 October 2003 2004 Asian Cup qualification	Iraq	5–1	Bahrain	Kuala Lumpur, Malaysia
	Mahmoud 5', 48', 69', 83'; Swadi 25'		Saleh Farhan 71'	Stadium: Bukit Jalil Stadium; Attendance: 350; Referee: Kazuhiko Matsumura (Japan)

10 October 2003 2004 Asian Cup qualification	Myanmar	1–3	Bahrain	Kuala Lumpur, Malaysia
	Soe Myat Min 77'		Talal Yousef 14'; A'ala Hubail 49'; Hussain Ali Ahmed 76'	Stadium: Bukit Jalil Stadium; Attendance: 800; Referee: Santhan Nagalingam (Singapore)

12 October 2003 2004 Asian Cup qualification	Malaysia	2–2	Bahrain	Kuala Lumpur, Malaysia
	Shukor Adan 80'; Norhafiz Zamani Misbah 90'		Sayed Mahmood Jalal 6'; Mohammed Husain Bahzad 45'	Stadium: Bukit Jalil Stadium; Attendance: 8,000; Referee: Kazuhiko Matsumura (Japan)

20 October 2003 2004 Asian Cup qualification	Bahrain	4–0	Myanmar	Manama, Bahrain
	Abdulla Al Marzooqi 22'; Hussain Ali Ahmed 27'; Sayed Mahmood Jalal 45'; Saleh Farhan 45+2' (pen.)			Stadium: Bahrain National Stadium; Attendance: 8,000; Referee: Abdullah Al-Harrasi (Oman)

22 October 2003 2004 Asian Cup qualification	Bahrain	3–1	Malaysia	Manama, Bahrain
	Hussain Ali Ahmed 30', 45'; Talal Yousef 43' (pen.)		Indra Putra Mahayuddin 37'	Stadium: Bahrain National Stadium; Attendance: 9,000; Referee: Talat Najm (Lebanon)

24 October 2003 2004 Asian Cup qualification	Bahrain	1–0	Iraq	Manama, Bahrain
	A'ala Hubail 12'			Stadium: Bahrain National Stadium; Attendance: 17,000; Referee: Mohammed Omar Al-Saaedi (UAE)

12 December 2003 Friendly tournament	Bahrain	2–2	Iraq	Bahrain

15 December 2003 Friendly tournament	Bahrain	0–1	Egypt	Bahrain

18 December 2003 Friendly tournament	Bahrain	2–1	Kenya	Bahrain

26 December 2003 2003 Gulf Cup	Bahrain	0–0	Qatar	Kuwait

30 December 2003 2003 Gulf Cup	Yemen	1–5	Bahrain	Kuwait

=== 2004 ===
1 January 2004 2003 Gulf Cup	Bahrain	0–1	Saudi Arabia	Kuwait

3 January 2004 2003 Gulf Cup	Oman	0–1	Bahrain	Kuwait

7 January 2004 2003 Gulf Cup	United Arab Emirates	1–3	Bahrain	Kuwait

10 January 2004 2003 Gulf Cup	Kuwait	0–4	Bahrain	Kuwait

8 February 2004 Friendly	Lebanon	2–1	Bahrain	Beirut, Lebanon

18 February 2004 2006 World Cup qualification	Bahrain	2–1	Syria	Al Muharraq Stadium, Arad
18:30	A. Hubail 64', 73'	Report	Sheikh Al-Eshreh 80'	Attendance: 5,000; Referee: Adunyachart Khanthama (Thailand)

31 March 2004 2006 World Cup qualification	Tajikistan	0–0	Bahrain	Pamir Stadium, Dushanbe
16:00		Report		Attendance: 17,000; Referee: Shamsul Maidin (Singapore)

9 June 2004 2006 World Cup qualification	Bahrain	5–0	Kyrgyzstan	Al Muharraq Stadium, Arad
19:15	A. Hubail 12', 45', 60'; Ali 66'; Abdulla 82'	Report		Attendance: 2,800; Referee: Mohamed Al Saeedi (United Arab Emirates)

17 July 2004 2004 Asian Cup GS	China	2–2	Bahrain	Workers Stadium, Beijing
20:00	Zheng Zhi 58' (pen.); Li Jinyu 66'	Report	M. Hubail 41'; Ali 89'	Attendance: 40,000; Referee: Subkhiddin Mohd Salleh (Malaysia)

21 July 2004 2004 Asian Cup GS	Bahrain	1–1	Qatar	Workers Stadium, Beijing
18:30	M. Hubail 90+1'	Report	Rizik 59' (pen.)	Attendance: 48,000; Referee: Toru Kamikawa (Japan)

25 July 2004 2004 Asian Cup GS	Bahrain	3–1	Indonesia	Shandong Sports Center, Jinan
19:00	Ali 43'; A. Hubail 57'; Yousef 82'	Report	Elie 75'	Attendance: 20,000; Referee: Coffi Codjia (Benin)

30 July 2004 2004 Asian Cup QF	Uzbekistan	2–2 (a.e.t.) (3–4 p)	Bahrain	Sichuan Longquanyi Stadium, Chengdu
18:00	Geynrikh 60'; Shishelov 86'	Report	A. Hubail 71', 76'	Attendance: 18,000; Referee: Kwon Jong-chul (South Korea)
	Penalties
	Fyodorov (penalty scored); Djeperov (penalty scored); Geynrikh (penalty scored); Bikmoev (penalty missed); Koshelev (penalty missed)		(penalty scored) Ali; (penalty missed) Juma; (penalty scored) Baba; (penalty scored) Farhan; (penalty scored) A. Hubail

3 August 2004 2004 Asian Cup SF	Bahrain	3–4 (a.e.t.)	Japan	Shandong Sports Center, Jinan
18:00	A. Hubail 7', 71'; Naser 85'	Report	Nakata 48'; Tamada 55', 93'; Nakazawa 90'	Attendance: 32,000; Referee: Shamsul Maidin (Singapore)

6 August 2004 2004 Asian Cup 3rd	Iran	4–2	Bahrain	Workers Stadium, Beijing
20:00	Nekounam 9'; Karimi 52'; Daei 80' (pen.), 90'	Report	Yousef 48'; Farhan 57'	Attendance: 10,000; Referee: Fareed Al-Marzouqi (United Arab Emirates)

8 September 2004 2006 World Cup qualification	Kyrgyzstan	1–2	Bahrain	Spartak Stadium, Bishkek
17:00	Kenjisariev 86'	Report	Ali 23'; M. Hubail 58'	Attendance: 10,000; Referee: Mongkol Rungklay (Thailand)

13 October 2004 2006 World Cup qualification	Syria	2–2	Bahrain	Abbasiyyin Stadium, Damascus
18:00	Sheikh Al-Eshreh 12'; Al Hussain 18'	Report	Mahfoodh 27'; Yousef 90+2'	Attendance: 35,000; Referee: Masoud Moradi (Iran)

17 November 2004 2006 World Cup qualification	Bahrain	4–0	Tajikistan	Bahrain National Stadium, Riffa
18:00	Yousef 9'; Husain 41'; M. Hubail 42', 77'	Report		Attendance: 15,000; Referee: Sun Baojie (China PR)

11 December 2004 2004 Gulf Cup	Yemen	1–1	Bahrain

14 December 2004 2004 Gulf Cup	Kuwait	1–1	Bahrain

17 December 2004 2004 Gulf Cup	Bahrain	3–0	Saudi Arabia

20 December 2004 2004 Gulf Cup	Oman	3–2	Bahrain

23 December 2004 2004 Gulf Cup	Bahrain	3–1	Kuwait

=== 2005 ===
25 January 2005 Friendly	Bahrain	0–1	Norway	Bahrain

2 February 2005 Friendly	Bahrain	2–1	Lebanon	Doha, Qatar
				Stadium: Suheim bin Hamad Stadium

9 February 2005 2006 World Cup qualification	Bahrain	0–0	Iran	Bahrain National Stadium, Riffa
		Report		Attendance: 25,000; Referee: Subkhiddin Mohd Salleh (Malaysia)

25 March 2005 2006 World Cup qualification	North Korea	1–2	Bahrain	Kim Il Sung Stadium, Pyongyang
	Pak Song-Gwan 63'	Report	Ali 7', 58'	Attendance: 50,000; Referee: Mongkol Rungklay (Thailand)

30 March 2005 2006 World Cup qualification	Japan	1–0	Bahrain	Saitama Stadium, Saitama
	Salmeen 72' (o.g.)	Report		Attendance: 67,549; Referee: Ravshan Irmatov (Uzbekistan)

27 May 2005 Friendly	Saudi Arabia	1–1	Bahrain	Saudi Arabia

3 June 2005 2006 World Cup qualification	Bahrain	0–1	Japan	Bahrain National Stadium, Riffa
		Report	Ogasawara 34'	Attendance: 32,000; Referee: Subkhiddin Mohd Salleh (Malaysia)

8 June 2005 2006 World Cup qualification	Iran	1–0	Bahrain	Azadi Stadium, Tehran
	Nosrati 48'	Report		Attendance: 80,000; Referee: Kwon Jong-Chul (Korea Republic)

3 August 2005 Friendly	Bahrain	5–0	Turkmenistan	Bahrain

7 August 2005 Friendly	Bahrain	2–2	Iraq	Bahrain

17 August 2005 2006 World Cup qualification	Bahrain	2–3	North Korea	Bahrain National Stadium, Riffa
	Isa 49'; Ali 54'	Report	Choe Chol-Man 28'; Kim Chol-Ho 43'; An Chol-Hyok 90'	Attendance: 3,000; Referee: Shamsul Maidin (Singapore)

8 October 2005 2006 World Cup qualification	Uzbekistan	1–1	Bahrain	Pakhtakor Stadium, Tashkent
17:05	Shatskikh 19'	Report	Yousef 17'	Attendance: 55,000; Referee: Massimo Busacca (Switzerland)

12 October 2005 (Note: The Bahrain v Uzbekistan match was originally scheduled to take place on 7 September 2005, 19:05, but was later rescheduled after the first leg was ordered to be replayed.) 2006 World Cup qualification	Bahrain	0–0	Uzbekistan	Bahrain National Stadium, Manama
22:00		Report		Attendance: 25,000; Referee: Graham Poll (England)

27 October 2005 Friendly	Bahrain	5–0	Panama	Bahrain

12 November 2005 2006 World Cup qualification	Trinidad and Tobago	1–1	Bahrain	Hasely Crawford Stadium, Port of Spain
18:30 UTC-4	Birchall 76'	(Report)	Ghuloom 72'	Attendance: 24,991; Referee: Mark Shield (Australia)

16 November 2005 2006 World Cup qualification	Bahrain	0–1	Trinidad and Tobago	Bahrain National Stadium, Riffa
19:00 UTC+3		(Report)	Lawrence 49'	Attendance: 35,000; Referee: Óscar Ruiz (Colombia)

=== 2006 ===
30 January 2006 Friendly	Bahrain	1–1	Syria	Bahrain

16 February 2006 Friendly	Bahrain	0–2	Palestine	Bahrain

22 February 2006 2007 Asian Cup qualification	Bahrain	1–3	Australia	Riffa, Bahrain
18:35	Ali 35'		Thompson 53'; Skoko 79'; Elrich 87' (pen.)	Stadium: Bahrain National Stadium; Attendance: 2,500; Referee: Subkhiddin Mohd Salleh (Malaysia)

1 March 2006 2007 Asian Cup qualification	Kuwait	0–0	Bahrain	Kuwait City, Kuwait
18:15				Stadium: National Stadium; Attendance: 16,000; Referee: Masoud Moradi (Iran)

9 August 2006 Friendly	Saudi Arabia	1–0	Bahrain	Saudi Arabia

2 September 2006 Friendly	Bahrain	0–2	Jordan	Bahrain

11 October 2006 2007 Asian Cup qualification	Australia	2–0	Bahrain	Sydney, Australia
19:30	Aloisi 17'; Bresciano 24'			Stadium: Sydney Football Stadium; Attendance: 36,606; Referee: Fareed Ali Mohamed Al Marzouqi (United Arab Emirates)

8 November 2006 Friendly	Oman	1–1	Bahrain	Oman

15 November 2006 2007 Asian Cup qualification	Bahrain	2–1	Kuwait	Riffa, Bahrain
18:00	Yousef 35' (pen.); Ghuloom 43'		Laheeb 70'	Stadium: Bahrain National Stadium; Attendance: 20,000; Referee: Kwon Jong-Chul (Korea Republic)

=== 2007 ===
12 January 2007 Friendly	Bahrain	4–0	Yemen	United Arab Emirates

18 January 2007 2007 Gulf Cup	Saudi Arabia	2–1	Bahrain	Al Nahyan Stadium, Abu Dhabi
	Al-Qahtani 26' (pen.) 89'		Yousef 13' (pen.)

21 January 2007 2007 Gulf Cup	Bahrain	1–1	Iraq	Al Nahyan Stadium, Abu Dhabi
	Al-Marzouqi 8'		H.M. Mohammed 11'

24 January 2007 2007 Gulf Cup	Qatar	1–2	Bahrain	Al Nahyan Stadium, Abu Dhabi
	Khalfan 19'		Hubail 45' 90+1'

27 January 2007 2007 Gulf Cup	Oman	1–0	Bahrain	Mohammed bin Zayed Stadium, Abu Dhabi
	Al-Maimani 55'

27 June 2007 Friendly	Bahrain	2–2	United Arab Emirates	Malaysia

30 June 2007 Friendly	Vietnam	5–3	Bahrain	Vietnam

10 July 2007 2007 Asian Cup GS	Indonesia	2–1	Bahrain	Gelora Bung Karno Stadium, Jakarta
17:15 UTC+7	Budi 14'; Bambang 64'	Report	Mahmood 27'	Attendance: 60,000; Referee: Yuichi Nishimura (Japan)

15 July 2007 2007 Asian Cup GS	Bahrain	2–1	South Korea	Gelora Bung Karno Stadium, Jakarta
19:30 UTC+7	Isa 43'; Abdul-Latif 85'	Report	Kim Do-heon 4'	Attendance: 9,000; Referee: Sun Baojie (China)

18 July 2007 2007 Asian Cup GS	Saudi Arabia	4–0	Bahrain	Gelora Sriwijaya Stadium, Palembang
17:15 UTC+7	Al-Mousa 18'; A. Al-Qahtani 45'; Al-Jassim 68', 79'	Report		Attendance: 500; Referee: Yuichi Nishimura (Japan)

7 September 2007 Friendly	Bahrain	1–3	Jordan	Bahrain National Stadium, Manama

4 October 2007 Friendly	Bahrain	3–1	Singapore	Bahrain National Stadium, Manama

16 October 2007 Friendly	Bahrain	2–0	Libya	Bahrain National Stadium, Manama

21 October 2007 2010 World Cup qualification	Bahrain	4–1	Malaysia	Bahrain National Stadium, Manama
18:00 UTC+3	Fatadi 4'; John 15'; Abdulrahman 55'; Hubail 90' (pen.)	Report	Bunyamin Omar 45+2'	Attendance: 4,000; Referee: Yang Zhiqiang (China)

28 October 2007 2010 World Cup qualification	Malaysia	0–0	Bahrain	Shah Alam Stadium, Petaling Jaya
20:45 UTC+8		Report		Attendance: 2,000; Referee: Lee Gi-Young (South Korea)

=== 2008 ===
6 February 2008 2010 World Cup qualification	Oman	0–1	Bahrain	Sultan Qaboos Sports Complex, Muscat
18:30 UTC+4		Report	Hubail 14'	Attendance: 28,000; Referee: Lee Gi-Young (South Korea)

26 March 2008 2010 World Cup qualification	Bahrain	1–0	Japan	Bahrain National Stadium, Riffa
17:20 UTC+3	Hubail 77'	Report		Attendance: 26,000; Referee: Mark Shield (Australia)

2 June 2008 2010 World Cup qualification	Thailand	2–3	Bahrain	Rajamangala National Stadium, Bangkok
18:30 UTC+7	Chaikamdee 25'; Winothai 45'	Report	Isa 22'; Latif 34'; Adnan 57'	Attendance: 15,000; Referee: Sun Baojie (China PR)

7 June 2008 2010 World Cup qualification	Bahrain	1–1	Thailand	Bahrain National Stadium, Riffa
19:30 UTC+3	Isa 67'	Report	Thonglao 65'	Attendance: 21,000; Referee: Muhsen Basma (Syria)

14 June 2008 2010 World Cup qualification	Bahrain	1–1	Oman	Bahrain National Stadium, Riffa
19:30 UTC+3	Aaish 41'	Report	Sulaiman 72'	Attendance: 25,000; Referee: Saad Al Fadhli (Kuwait)

22 June 2008 2010 World Cup qualification	Japan	1–0	Bahrain	Saitama Stadium, Saitama
19:20 UTC+9	Uchida 90'	Report		Attendance: 51,180; Referee: Ravshan Irmatov (Uzbekistan)

6 September 2008 2010 World Cup qualification	Bahrain	2–3	Japan	Bahrain National Stadium, Madinat 'Isa
21:30 UTC+3	Isa 87'; Tulio 89' (o.g.)	Report	S. Nakamura 18'; Endō 44' (pen.); K. Nakamura 85'	Attendance: 20,000; Referee: Abdul Malik Bashir (Singapore)

10 September 2008 2010 World Cup qualification	Qatar	1–1	Bahrain	Jassim Bin Hamad Stadium, Doha
22:00 UTC+3	Soria 6'	Report	Fatadi 67'	Attendance: 7,000; Referee: Kim Dong-Jin (South Korea)

19 November 2008 2010 World Cup qualification	Bahrain	0–1	Australia	Bahrain National Stadium, Madinat 'Isa
18:00 UTC+3		Report	Bresciano 90+3'	Attendance: 10,000; Referee: Masoud Moradi (Iran)

=== 2009 ===
4 January 2009 2009 Gulf Cup	Bahrain	3–1	Iraq	Sultan Qaboos Sports Complex, Muscat
	Yaser 28'; Adnan 69' (pen.); Al-Dakeel 90+2'		Mahmoud 81' (pen.)

7 January 2009 2009 Gulf Cup	Bahrain	0–1	Kuwait	Sultan Qaboos Sports Complex, Muscat
			Neda 28'

10 January 2009 2009 Gulf Cup	Oman	2–0	Bahrain	Sultan Qaboos Sports Complex, Muscat
	Al-Maimani 14'; Bashir 71'

4 February 2009 Friendly	Bahrain	2–2	South Korea	Bahrain

11 February 2009 2010 World Cup qualification	Uzbekistan	0–1	Bahrain	Pakhtakor Stadium, Tashkent
16:00 UTC+5		Report	Abdulrahman 90+4'	Attendance: 30,000; Referee: Subkhiddin Mohd Salleh (Malaysia)

23 March 2009 Friendly	Bahrain	5–2	Zimbabwe	Bahrain

28 March 2009 2010 World Cup qualification	Japan	1–0	Bahrain	Saitama Stadium, Saitama
19:20 UTC+9	S. Nakamura 47'	Report		Attendance: 57,276; Referee: Kim Dong-Jin (Korea Republic)

1 April 2009 2010 World Cup qualification	Bahrain	1–0	Qatar	Bahrain National Stadium, Madinat 'Isa
17:15 UTC+3	Aaish 52'	Report		Attendance: 20,000; Referee: Sun Baojie (China PR)

31 May 2009 Friendly	Bahrain	3–1	Congo	Bahrain

3 June 2009 Friendly	Bahrain	4–0	Jordan	Bahrain

10 June 2009 2010 World Cup qualification	Australia	2–0	Bahrain	Stadium Australia, Sydney
20:00 UTC+10	Sterjovski 55'; Carney 88'	Report		Attendance: 39,540; Referee: Abdullah Al Hilali (Oman)

17 June 2009 2010 World Cup qualification	Bahrain	1–0	Uzbekistan	Bahrain National Stadium, Madinat 'Isa
19:30 UTC+3	Abdulrahman 73'	Report		Attendance: 14,100; Referee: Masoud Moradi (Iran)

26 August 2009 Friendly tournament	Bahrain	2–1	Kenya	Bahrain

31 August 2009 Friendly tournament	Bahrain	4–2	Iran	Bahrain

5 September 2009 2010 World Cup qualification	Bahrain	0–0	Saudi Arabia	Riffa, Bahrain
22:00 UTC+3		Report		Stadium: Bahrain National Stadium; Attendance: 16,000; Referee: Yuichi Nishimura (Japan)

9 September 2009 2010 World Cup qualification	Saudi Arabia	2–2	Bahrain	Riyadh, Saudi Arabia
22:15 UTC+3	Al-Shamrani 13'; Al-Montashari 90+1'	Report	Jaycee John 42'; Abdullatif 90+3'	Stadium: King Fahd International Stadium; Attendance: 50,000; Referee: Ravshan Irmatov (Uzbekistan)

10 October 2009 2010 World Cup qualification	Bahrain	0–0	New Zealand	Riffa, Bahrain
18:30 UTC+03:00		(Report)		Stadium: Bahrain National Stadium; Attendance: 37,000; Referee: Viktor Kassai (Hungary)

6 November 2009 Friendly	Bahrain	5–1	Togo	Bahrain

14 November 2009 2010 World Cup qualification	New Zealand	1–0	Bahrain	Wellington, New Zealand
20:00 UTC+13:00	Fallon 45'	(Report)		Stadium: Westpac Stadium; Attendance: 36,500; Referee: Jorge Larrionda (Uruguay)

== Head to head records ==
Bahrain national football team head-to-head records (2000–2009)
Opponent	Pld	W	D	L	GF	GA	GD	Pts	Confederation
Albania	1	1	0	0	3	0	+3	3	UEFA
Australia	4	0	0	4	1	8	–7	0	AFC
Bosnia and Herzegovina	1	0	0	1	0	1	–1	0	UEFA
China	2	0	2	0	4	4	0	2	AFC
Congo	1	1	0	0	3	1	+2	3	CAF
Egypt	1	0	0	1	0	1	–1	0	CAF
Finland	1	0	0	1	0	2	–2	0	UEFA
Indonesia	2	1	0	1	4	3	+1	3	AFC
Iran	8	3	2	3	10	11	–1	11	AFC
Iraq	9	3	4	2	14	14	0	13	AFC
Japan	7	1	0	6	6	11	–5	3	AFC
Jordan	7	2	1	4	8	12	–4	7	AFC
Kazakhstan	2	0	0	2	0	3	–3	0	UEFA
Kenya	2	2	0	0	4	2	+2	6	CAF
Kuwait	9	4	3	2	12	6	+6	15	AFC
Kyrgyzstan	4	4	0	0	10	2	+8	12	AFC
Lebanon	5	2	2	1	8	7	+1	8	AFC
Libya	1	1	0	0	2	0	+2	3	CAF
Macedonia	1	0	1	0	1	1	0	1	UEFA
Malaysia	5	3	2	0	13	6	+7	11	AFC
Maldives	2	2	0	0	5	1	+4	6	AFC
Myanmar	2	2	0	0	7	1	+6	6	AFC
New Zealand	2	0	1	1	0	1	–1	1	OFC
North Korea	2	1	0	1	4	4	0	3	AFC
Norway	1	0	0	1	0	1	–1	0	UEFA
Oman	12	2	4	6	10	15	–5	10	AFC
Palestine	1	0	0	1	0	2	–2	0	AFC
Panama	1	1	0	0	5	0	+5	3	CONCACAF
Qatar	9	4	4	1	8	5	+3	16	AFC
Saudi Arabia	13	1	4	8	10	22	–12	7	AFC
Singapore	3	3	0	0	7	2	+5	9	AFC
Slovakia	1	1	0	0	2	0	+2	3	UEFA
South Korea	2	1	1	0	4	3	+1	4	AFC
Syria	8	2	2	4	9	10	–1	8	AFC
Tajikistan	2	1	1	0	4	0	+4	4	AFC
Thailand	4	1	3	0	6	5	+1	6	AFC
Togo	1	1	0	0	5	1	+4	3	CAF
Trinidad and Tobago	2	0	1	1	1	2	–1	1	CONCACAF
Turkmenistan	1	1	0	0	5	0	+5	3	AFC
United Arab Emirates	4	3	1	0	11	5	+6	10	AFC
Uzbekistan	6	2	3	1	5	5	0	9	AFC
Vietnam	1	0	0	1	3	5	–2	0	AFC
Yemen	4	3	1	0	13	3	+10	10	AFC
Zimbabwe	1	1	0	0	5	2	+3	3	CAF
Total	158	60	40	58	233	196	+37	220	

== Notes ==
^{1} This match was originally scheduled for 13 October 2001 and started normally, but was interrupted at 25 minutes when Bahrain won 1–0 due to an electrical fire at Rajamangala Stadium.
