= Bahrain at the AFC Asian Cup =

National football delegation

Since the AFC Asian Cup was founded, so far, Bahrain has qualified for eight Asian Cups, starting from 1988 and since 2004 to 2027. Bahrain, in spite of its small population, has achieved numerous impressive results, notably beating South Korea and Qatar 2–1 in 2007 and 2015, or a thrilling match with Japan in 2004 which Bahrain lost. However, in all six appearances, Bahrain's best result has been a fourth place finish, in 2004. Since then, Bahrain has made the knockout stage twice: in 2019 and in 2023.

== Overall record ==
Asian Cup record							
Year	Round	Pld	W	D*	L	GF	GA
(Hong Kong) 1956	Did not enter						
(South Korea) 1960	Did not enter						
(Israel) 1964	Did not enter						
(Iran) 1968	Did not enter						
(Thailand) 1972	Did not qualify						
(Iran) 1976	Withdrew						
(Kuwait) 1980	Withdrew after qualifying						
(Singapore) 1984	Withdrew						
(Qatar) 1988	Group stage	4	0	2	2	1	3
(Japan) 1992	Did not qualify						
(United Arab Emirates) 1996	Withdrew						
(Lebanon) 2000	Did not qualify						
(China) 2004	Fourth place	6	1	3	2	13	14
(Indonesia) (Malaysia) (Thailand) (Vietnam) 2007	Group stage	3	1	0	2	3	7
(Qatar) 2011	Group stage	3	1	0	2	6	5
(Australia) 2015	Group stage	3	1	0	2	3	5
(United Arab Emirates) 2019	Round of 16	4	1	1	2	3	4
(Qatar) 2023	Round of 16	4	2	0	2	4	6
(Saudi Arabia) 2027	Qualified						
Total	8/19	27	7	6	14	33	44

== Head-to-head record ==
AFC Asian Cup matches (by team)
Opponent	Played	Wins	Draws	Losses	Goals Scored	Goals Conceded	Last win
Australia	1	0	0	1	0	1	DNW
China	2	0	1	1	2	3	DNW
India	2	2	0	0	6	2	2019
Indonesia	2	1	0	1	4	3	2004
Iran	2	0	0	2	2	6	DNW
Japan	2	0	0	2	4	7	DNW
Jordan	1	1	0	0	1	0	2023
Kuwait	1	0	1	0	0	0	DNW
Malaysia	1	1	0	0	1	0	2023
Qatar	2	1	1	0	3	2	2015
Saudi Arabia	2	0	1	1	1	5	DNW
South Korea	4	1	0	3	5	8	2007
Syria	1	0	0	1	0	1	DNW
Thailand	1	0	0	1	0	1	DNW
United Arab Emirates	2	0	1	1	2	3	DNW
Uzbekistan	1	0	1	0	2	2	DNW

== 1988 Asian Cup in Qatar ==
=== Group B ===
Pos	Team	Pld	W	D	L	GF	GA	GD	Pts	Qualification
1	Saudi Arabia	4	2	2	0	4	1	+3	6	Advance to knockout stage
2	China	4	2	1	1	6	3	+3	5	Advance to knockout stage
3	Syria	4	2	0	2	2	5	−3	4	
4	Kuwait	4	0	3	1	2	3	−1	3	
5	Bahrain	4	0	2	2	1	3	−2	2	

Source: RSSSF
3 December 1988
17:00

Kuwait	0–0	Bahrain
	Report

Al-Ahly Stadium, Doha
Referee: Vincent Mauro (United States)

6 December 1988
17:00

Bahrain	0–1	China
	Report	Zhang Xiaowen 78'

Qatar SC Stadium, Doha
Referee: Syed Shahid Hakim (India)

9 December 1988
15:00

Saudi Arabia	1–1	Bahrain
Jazea'a 78'	Report	F. Mohamed 44' (pen.)

Qatar SC Stadium, Doha
Referee: Vincent Mauro (United States)

11 December 1988
15:00

Bahrain	0–1	Syria
	Report	Abu Al-Sel 72' (pen.)

Qatar SC Stadium, Doha
Referee: Michel Vautrot (France)

== 2004 Asian Cup in China ==
=== Group A ===
Pos	Team	Pld	W	D	L	GF	GA	GD	Pts	Qualification
1	China (H)	3	2	1	0	8	2	+6	7	Advance to knockout stage
2	Bahrain	3	1	2	0	6	4	+2	5	Advance to knockout stage
3	Indonesia	3	1	0	2	3	9	−6	3	
4	Qatar	3	0	1	2	2	4	−2	1	

Source: RSSSF
(H) Hosts
17 July 2004
20:00

China	2–2	Bahrain
Zheng Zhi 58' (pen.); Li Jinyu 66'	Report	M. Hubail 41'; Ali 89'

Workers Stadium, Beijing
Attendance: 40,000
Referee: Subkhiddin Mohd Salleh (Malaysia)

21 July 2004
18:30

Bahrain	1–1	Qatar
M. Hubail 90+1'	Report	Rizik 59' (pen.)

Workers Stadium, Beijing
Attendance: 48,000
Referee: Toru Kamikawa (Japan)

25 July 2004
19:00

Bahrain	3–1	Indonesia
Ali 43'; A. Hubail 57'; Yousef 82'	Report	Aiboy 75'

Shandong Sports Center, Jinan
Attendance: 20,000
Referee: Coffi Codjia (Benin)

=== Quarter-finals ===
30 July 2004
18:00

Uzbekistan	2–2 (a.e.t.)	Bahrain
Geynrikh 60'; Shishelov 86'	Report	A. Hubail 71', 76'
Penalties
Fyodorov (penalty scored); Djeperov (penalty scored); Geynrikh (penalty scored); Bikmoev (penalty missed); Koshelev (penalty missed)	3–4	(penalty scored) Ali; (penalty missed) Juma; (penalty scored) Baba; (penalty scored) Farhan; (penalty scored) A. Hubail

Sichuan Longquanyi Stadium, Chengdu
Attendance: 18,000
Referee: Kwon Jong-Chul (Korea Republic)

=== Semi-finals ===
3 August 2004
18:00

Bahrain	3–4 (a.e.t.)	Japan
A. Hubail 7', 71'; Naser 85'	Report	Nakata 48'; Tamada 55', 93'; Nakazawa 90'

Shandong Sports Center, Jinan
Attendance: 32,000
Referee: Shamsul Maidin (Singapore)

=== Third place play-off ===
6 August 2004
20:00

Iran	4–2	Bahrain
Nekounam 9'; Karimi 52'; Daei 80' (pen.), 90'	Report	Yousef 48'; Farhan 57'

Workers Stadium, Beijing
Attendance: 10,000
Referee: Fareed Al-Marzouqi (United Arab Emirates)

== 2007 Asian Cup in Indonesia/Malaysia/Thailand/Vietnam ==
=== Group D ===
Pos	Team	Pld	W	D	L	GF	GA	GD	Pts	Qualification
1	Saudi Arabia	3	2	1	0	7	2	+5	7	Advance to knockout stage
2	South Korea	3	1	1	1	3	3	0	4	Advance to knockout stage
3	Indonesia (H)	3	1	0	2	3	4	−1	3	
4	Bahrain	3	1	0	2	3	7	−4	3	

Source: Asian Cup 2007
Rules for classification: Tiebreakers
(H) Hosts
10 July 2007
17:15 UTC+7

Indonesia	2–1	Bahrain
Sudarsono 14'; Bambang 64'	Report	Mahmood 27'

Gelora Bung Karno Stadium, Jakarta
Attendance: 60,000
Referee: Yuichi Nishimura (Japan)

15 July 2007
19:30 UTC+7

Bahrain	2–1	South Korea
Isa 43'; Abdul-Latif 85'	Report	Kim Do-Heon 4'

Gelora Bung Karno Stadium, Jakarta
Attendance: 9,000
Referee: Sun Baojie (China)

18 July 2007
17:15 UTC+7

Saudi Arabia	4–0	Bahrain
Al-Mousa 18'; A. Al-Qahtani 45'; Al-Jassim 68', 79'	Report

Gelora Sriwijaya Stadium, Palembang
Attendance: 500
Referee: Yuichi Nishimura (Japan)

== 2011 Asian Cup in Qatar ==
=== Group C ===
Pos	Team	Pld	W	D	L	GF	GA	GD	Pts	Qualification
1	Australia	3	2	1	0	6	1	+5	7	Advance to knockout stage
2	South Korea	3	2	1	0	7	3	+4	7	Advance to knockout stage
3	Bahrain	3	1	0	2	6	5	+1	3	
4	India	3	0	0	3	3	13	−10	0	

Source: AFC
Rules for classification: Tiebreakers

10 January 2011
South Korea	2–1	Bahrain
14 January 2011
Bahrain	5–2	India
18 January 2011
Australia	1–0	Bahrain

== 2015 Asian Cup in Australia ==
=== Group C ===
Pos	Team	Pld	W	D	L	GF	GA	GD	Pts	Qualification
1	Iran	3	3	0	0	4	0	+4	9	Advance to knockout stage
2	United Arab Emirates	3	2	0	1	6	3	+3	6	Advance to knockout stage
3	Bahrain	3	1	0	2	3	5	−2	3	
4	Qatar	3	0	0	3	2	7	−5	0	

Source: Asian Cup Australia 2015
Rules for classification: Tiebreakers

11 January 2015
Iran	2–0	Bahrain	AAMI Park, Melbourne
15 January 2015
Bahrain	1–2	United Arab Emirates	Canberra Stadium, Canberra
19 January 2015
Qatar	1–2	Bahrain	Stadium Australia, Sydney

== 2019 Asian Cup in the UAE ==
=== Group A ===
Pos	Team	Pld	W	D	L	GF	GA	GD	Pts	Qualification
1	United Arab Emirates (H)	3	1	2	0	4	2	+2	5	Advance to knockout stage
2	Thailand	3	1	1	1	3	5	−2	4 (Note: Head-to-head points: Thailand 3, Bahrain 0.)	Advance to knockout stage
3	Bahrain	3	1	1	1	2	2	0	4	Advance to knockout stage
4	India	3	1	0	2	4	4	0	3	

Source: AFC
(H) Hosts
Notes:
5 January 2019
20:00

United Arab Emirates	1–1	Bahrain
Khalil 88' (pen.)	Report	Al Romaihi 78'

Zayed Sports City Stadium, Abu Dhabi
Attendance: 33,878
Referee: Adham Makhadmeh (Jordan)

10 January 2019
15:00

Bahrain	0–1	Thailand
	Report	Chanathip 58'

Al Maktoum Stadium, Dubai
Attendance: 2,720
Referee: Chris Beath (Australia)

14 January 2019
20:00

India	0–1	Bahrain
	Report	Rashid 90+1' (pen.)

Sharjah Stadium, Sharjah
Attendance: 11,417
Referee: Ilgiz Tantashev (Uzbekistan)

=== Round of 16 ===
22 January 2019
17:00

South Korea	2–1 (a.e.t.)	Bahrain
Hwang Hee-chan 43'; Kim Jin-su 105+2'	Report	Al Romaihi 77'

Rashid Stadium, Dubai
Attendance: 7,658
Referee: Ryuji Sato (Japan)

== 2023 Asian Cup in Qatar ==
=== Group A ===
Pos	Team	Pld	W	D	L	GF	GA	GD	Pts	Qualification
1	Bahrain	3	2	0	1	3	3	0	6	Advance to knockout stage
2	South Korea	3	1	2	0	8	6	+2	5	Advance to knockout stage
3	Jordan	3	1	1	1	6	3	+3	4	Advance to knockout stage
4	Malaysia	3	0	1	2	3	8	−5	1	

Source: AFC
15 January 2024
14:30

South Korea	3–1	Bahrain
Hwang In-beom 38'; Lee Kang-in 56', 68'	Report	Al-Hashash 51'

Jassim bin Hamad Stadium, Al Rayyan
Attendance: 8,388
Referee: Ma Ning (China)

20 January 2024
17:30

Bahrain	1–0	Malaysia
Madan 90+5'	Report

Jassim bin Hamad Stadium, Al Rayyan
Attendance: 10,386
Referee: Ahmed Al-Kaf (Oman)

25 January 2024
14:30

Jordan	0–1	Bahrain
	Report	Helal 34'

Khalifa International Stadium, Al Rayyan
Attendance: 39,650
Referee: Omar Al-Ali (United Arab Emirates)

=== Knockout stage ===
==== Round of 16 ====
31 January 2024
14:30

Bahrain	1–3	Japan
Ueda 64' (o.g.)	Report	Dōan 31'; Kubo 49'; Ueda 72'

Al Thumama Stadium, Doha
Attendance: 31,832
Referee: Ahmad Al-Ali (Kuwait)
