= Hubail =

Hubail is a surname. Notable people with the surname include:

- A'ala Hubail (born 1982), Bahraini footballer
- Mohamed Hubail (born 1981), Bahraini footballer
