= Duaij Naser Abdulla =

Bahraini footballer

Personal information
- Full name: Duaij Naser Abdulla
- Date of birth: 18 January 1983 (age 43)
- Place of birth: Bahrain
- Height: 1.74 m (5 ft 9 in)
- Position: Striker

Team information
- Current team: Al-Hala

Senior career*
| Years | Team | Apps | (Gls) |
| 2002–2003 | Al-Hala | | |
| 2003–2004 | Muharraq Club | | |
| 2004 | Al-Shamal | 20 | (5) |
| 2005 | Al-Gharrafa | | |
| 2005 | Al-Wakra | | |
| 2006–2007 | Muharraq Club | | |
| 2007–2008 | Busaiteen Club | | |
| 2008–2010 | Al-Hala | | |
| 2010–2012 | Al-Zalzal | | |

International career
| 2002–2005 | Bahrain | 25 | (4) |
- * Club domestic league appearances and goals as of 20 November 2008

Duaij Naser Abdulla (born January 18, 1983) is a Bahraini footballer currently playing for Al-Hala of Bahrain and the Bahrain national football team.

== Career statistics ==
=== International ===
Appearances and goals by national team and year
| National team | Year | Apps | Goals |
|---|---|---|---|
| Bahrain | 2002 | 5 | 0 |
| Bahrain | 2004 | 13 | 4 |
| Bahrain | 2005 | 7 | 0 |
| Total | | 25 | 4 |

Scores and results list Bahrain's goal tally first, score column indicates score after each Abdulla goal.

List of international goals scored by Duaij Naser Abdulla
| No. | Date | Venue | Opponent | Score | Result | Competition | Ref. |
|---|---|---|---|---|---|---|---|
| 1 | 9 June 2004 | Al Muharraq Stadium, Arad, Bahrain | Kyrgyzstan | 5–0 | 5–0 | 2006 FIFA World Cup qualification | |
| 2 | 3 August 2004 | Shandong Provincial Stadium, Jinan, China | Japan | 3–2 | 3–4 | 2004 AFC Asian Cup | |
| 3 | 20 December 2004 | Ahmed bin Ali Stadium, Al Rayyan, Qatar | Oman | 2–2 | 2–3 | 17th Arabian Gulf Cup | |
| 4 | 23 December 2004 | Jassim bin Hamad Stadium, Doha, Qatar | Kuwait | 3–1 | 3–1 | 17th Arabian Gulf Cup | |
