= Musaed Neda =

Kuwaiti footballer

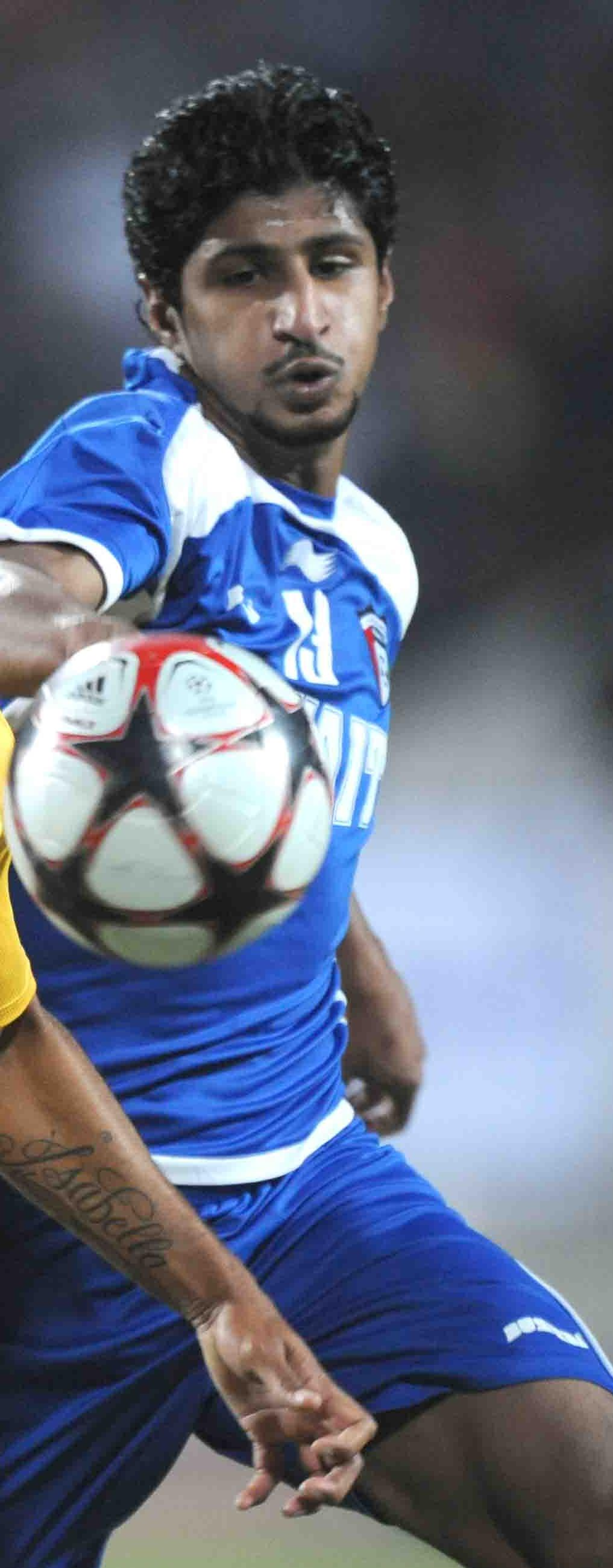

Personal information
- Full name: Musaed Neda Al-Enazi
- Date of birth: July 8, 1983 (age 43)
- Place of birth: Kuwait City, Kuwait
- Height: 1.88 m (6 ft 2 in)
- Position: Left wing back

Senior career*
Years	Team	Apps	(Gls)
2001–2018	Al Qadisiya	310	(95)
2004–2005	→ Al-Wakra (loan)	5	(0)
2006–2006	→ Al-Nassr (loan)	6	(0)
2010–2011	→ Al-Shabab (loan)	8	(0)
2014–2015	→ Al-Orobah (loan)	11	(3)
2015–2016	→ Al-Salmiya SC (loan)	24	(5)
2019–2023	Al-Salmiya SC	31	(6)
Total		395	(109)

International career
2002–2015	Kuwait	126	(20)
- * Club domestic league appearances and goals as of 18 March 2021

Musaed Neda Al-Enazi (Arabic: مساعد ندا العنزي) is a former Kuwaiti football defender.

== Career statistics ==
=== International ===
Appearances and goals by national team and year
National team	Year	Apps	Goals
Kuwait	2002	3	2
Kuwait	2003	13	1
Kuwait	2004	22	3
Kuwait	2005	4	0
Kuwait	2006	–	
Kuwait	2007	3	0
Kuwait	2008	5	0
Kuwait	2009	17	5
Kuwait	2010	18	2
Kuwait	2011	10	4
Kuwait	2012	5	0
Kuwait	2013	8	0
Kuwait	2014	8	1
Kuwait	2015	10	2
Total		126	20

Scores and results list Kuwait's goal tally first, score column indicates score after each Neda goal.

List of international goals scored by Musaed Neda
No.	Date	Venue	Opponent	Score	Result	Competition
1	18 December 2002	Al Kuwait Sports Club Stadium, Kuwait City, Kuwait	Sudan	1–0	1–0	2002 Arab Cup
2	25 December 2002	Al Kuwait Sports Club Stadium, Kuwait City, Kuwait	Palestine	1–1	3–3	2002 Arab Cup
3	3 September 2003	National Stadium, Kallang, Singapore	Singapore	1–0	3–1	2004 AFC Asian Cup qualification
4	9 June 2004	Al-Sadaqua Walsalam Stadium, Kuwait City, Kuwait	Hong Kong	3–0	4–0	2006 FIFA World Cup qualification
5	8 September 2004	Siu Sai Wan Sports Ground, Chai Wan, Hong Kong	Hong Kong	1–0	2–0	2006 FIFA World Cup qualification
6	11 December 2004	Ahmed bin Ali Stadium, Al Rayyan, Qatar	Saudi Arabia	2–1	2–1	17th Arabian Gulf Cup
7	7 January 2009	Sultan Qaboos Sports Complex, Muscat, Oman	Bahrain	1–0	1–0	19th Arabian Gulf Cup
8	23 January 2009	Al-Sadaqua Walsalam Stadium, Kuwait City, Kuwait	Syria	1–0	2–3	Friendly
9	5 March 2009	Canberra Stadium, Canberra, Australia	Australia	1–0	1–0	2011 AFC Asian Cup qualification
10	3 November 2009	Al-Hadaf Stadium, Cairo, Egypt	Kenya	1–0	5–0	Friendly
11	8 November 2009	Al Kuwait Sports Club Stadium, Kuwait City, Kuwait	China	2–2	2–2	Friendly
12	17 November 2010	Khalid bin Mohammed Stadium, Sharjah, United Arab Emirates	Iraq	1–1	1–1	Friendly
13	24 December 2010	Dream Land Playing Field, Cairo, Egypt	North Korea	2–1	2–1	Friendly
14	2 July 2011	Camille Chamoun Sports City Stadium, Beirut, Lebanon	Lebanon	1–0	6–0	Friendly
15	2 July 2011	Camille Chamoun Sports City Stadium, Beirut, Lebanon	Lebanon	2–0	6–0	Friendly
16	23 July 2011	Mohammed Al-Hamad Stadium, Hawally, Kuwait	Philippines	2–0	3–0	2014 FIFA World Cup qualification
17	11 October 2011	Camille Chamoun Sports City Stadium, Beirut	Lebanon	1–1	2–2	2014 FIFA World Cup qualification
18	4 November 2014	Al Nahyan Stadium, Abu Dhabi, United Arab Emirates	Yemen	1–1	1–1	Friendly
19	30 March 2015	Mohammed Bin Zayed Stadium, Abu Dhabi, United Arab Emirates	Colombia	1–1	1–3	Friendly
20	5 June 2015	Maltepe Hasan Polat Stadium, Maltepe, Turkey	Jordan	2–2	2–2	Friendly

== See also ==
- List of men's footballers with 100 or more international caps
