= 2004 AFC Asian Cup =

2004年亚洲杯足球赛

Tournament details
- Host country: China
- Dates: 17 July – 7 August
- Teams: 16 (from 1 confederation)
- Venues: 4 (in 4 host cities)

Final positions
- Champions: Japan (3rd title)
- Runners-up: China
- Third place: Iran
- Fourth place: Bahrain

Tournament statistics
- Matches played: 32
- Goals scored: 96 (3 per match)
- Attendance: 937,650 (29,302 per match)
- Top scorer(s): (Bahrain) A'ala Hubail (Iran) Ali Karimi (5 goals each)
- Best player: (Japan) Shunsuke Nakamura
- Fair play award: China

The 2004 AFC Asian Cup was the 13th edition of the men's AFC Asian Cup, a quadrennial international football tournament organised by the Asian Football Confederation (AFC). It was held from 17 July to 7 August 2004 in China. The defending champions Japan defeated China in the final in Beijing.

The tournament was marked by Saudi Arabia's unexpected failure to even make it out of the first round; a surprisingly good performance by Bahrain, which finished in fourth place; Jordan, which reached the quarterfinals in its first appearance and Indonesia, which gained their historical first Asian Cup win against Qatar. The final match between China and Japan was marked by post-match rioting by Chinese fans near the north gate of Beijing Workers' Stadium, in part due to controversial officiating and anti-Japanese sentiment resulting from historical tensions.

== Venues ==
2004 AFC Asian Cup is located in China	Beijing	Chongqing	Jinan	Chengdu
2004 AFC Asian Cup is located in China	Workers' Stadium	Chongqing Olympic Sports Center	Shandong Sports Center	Chengdu Longquanyi Football Stadium
2004 AFC Asian Cup is located in China	Capacity: 72,000	Capacity: 58,680	Capacity: 43,700	Capacity: 27,333

== Qualification ==
The lowest-ranked 20 teams were placed in 6 preliminary qualifying groups of 3 and one group of 2, with the group winners joining the remaining 21 teams in 7 groups of 4. The top two of each of these groups qualified for the finals in China.

=== Qualified teams ===
Of the 16 teams appearing, 11 teams were returning after appearing in the 2000 edition.

Three teams qualified for the first time: Jordan, Oman and Turkmenistan. Bahrain qualified for the first time since 1988. United Arab Emirates qualified for the first time since hosting the 1996 edition, and on merit for the first time since 1992.

Country	Qualified as	Date qualification was secured	Previous appearances in tournament^{1, 2}
China	Hosts	28 October 2000	7 (1976, 1980, 1984, 1988, 1992, 1996, 2000)
Japan	2000 AFC Asian Cup winners	26 October 2000	4 (1988, **1992**, 1996, **2000**)
Kuwait	Qualifying round Group B winners	5 October 2003	7 (1972, 1976, **1980**, 1984, 1988, 1996, 2000)
Saudi Arabia	Qualifying round Group C winners	15 October 2003	5 (**1984**, **1988**, 1992, **1996**, 2000)
Indonesia	Qualifying round Group C runners-up	15 October 2003	2 (1996, 2000)
Oman	Qualifying round Group E winners	21 October 2003	0 (Debut)
Iraq	Qualifying round Group F winners	22 October 2003	4 (1972, 1976, 1996, 2000)
Bahrain	Qualifying round Group F runners-up	22 October 2003	1 (1988)
South Korea	Qualifying round Group E runners-up	24 October 2003	9 (**1956**, **1960**, 1964, 1972, 1980, 1984, 1988, 1996, 2000)
Jordan	Qualifying round Group D runners-up	18 November 2003	0 (Debut)
United Arab Emirates	Qualifying round Group G runners-up	18 November 2003	5 (1980, 1984, 1988, 1992, 1996)
Uzbekistan	Qualifying round Group A winners	19 November 2003	2 (1996, 2000)
Qatar	Qualifying round Group B runners-up	19 November 2003	5 (1980, 1984, 1988, 1992, 2000)
Iran	Qualifying round Group D winners	19 November 2003	9 (**1968**, **1972**, **1976**, 1980, 1984, 1988, 1992, 1996, 2000)
Thailand	Qualifying round Group A runners-up	21 November 2003	4 (1972, 1992, 1996, 2000)
Turkmenistan	Qualifying round Group G winners	28 November 2003	0 (Debut)

Notes:

^{1} Bold indicates champion for that year
^{2} Italic indicates host

== Seeds ==
Pot A	Pot B	Pot C	Pot D
China; Japan; South Korea; Saudi Arabia	Iran; Iraq; Kuwait; Qatar	Indonesia; Thailand; United Arab Emirates; Uzbekistan	Bahrain; Jordan; Oman; Turkmenistan

== Tournament summary ==
This competition saw a huge number of surprises. The first surprise named Bahrain was in group A, which, despite being just its second tournament, held on China and fellow neighbor Qatar before beating Indonesia 3–1, with the Hubail brothers Mohamed and Ala'a instrumental in bringing Bahrain to the quarter-finals. Host China, after a shock draw to Bahrain, easily progressed to the next round after thrashing Indonesia 5–0 before Xu Yunlong scored the decisive goal in China's hard fought win over Qatar to process.

In group B, Jordan emerged as a second surprise, as the country just made its debut in the competition. Jordan surprised the whole tournament by two draws to the United Arab Emirates and, especially, a successful goalless draw to South Korea which had already finished in fourth place at the 2002 FIFA World Cup earlier, between that, Jordan shocked Kuwait with two late goals to seal a 2–0 victory, thus finishing second and progressed to the next round alongside South Korea, which, after being held by Jordan, decisively beat Kuwait and the United Arab Emirates to progress.

The two other debutants were Turkmenistan and Oman in group C and D surprised by not finishing bottom in their group, though they failed to progress. Instead, it was the two experienced Saudi Arabia and Thailand which disappointed most of fans, finishing bottom after disastrous performances. In group C, Uzbekistan also surprised by topping the group with three straight 1–0 win while Japan and Iran were able to progress in group D after a final goalless draw and better result than Oman. Iraq was the other qualifier in group C, after beating both Turkmenistan and Saudi Arabia only by one goal margin.

The quarter-finals saw Jordan caused significant problem for Japan, and Jordan was thought to have almost qualified for the semi-finals in the penalty shootout. However, four straight misses later cost Jordan's semi-final dream to end. Uzbekistan and Bahrain held on in a 2–2 draw and Bahrain prevailed after penalty shootout. Host China easily crushed Iraq 3–0, with Zheng Zhi scored two penalties to take Iraq home, while South Korea and Iran created the most phenomenon match in the tournament, an insane thriller where Iran prevailed 4–3 in what would be perceived as one of the greatest Asian Cup matches in both this tournament and in history.

The first semi-final saw Iran and host China battling for the final, with both being held 1–1, despite Iran was down to ten men. China eventually won in penalty shootout. The other semi-final was another insane 4-3 thriller between Bahrain and Japan, in a match that featured 4 lead changes, a Bahraini goal to take a 3-2 lead in the 85th minute, and a Japanese equalizer in extra time. The Japanese eventually won after extra times thanked for a goal by Keiji Tamada in early minutes of the first half of extra time, thus sent Japan to the final against host China. Iran overcame Bahrain in a consolidating third place encounter, 4–2, to acquire bronze.

Iran was also a major storyline in this tournament due to several strange storylines that developed over the course of the tournament. After comfortably defeating Thailand 3-0 in their first match, they shockingly fell 2-0 behind tournament debutants Oman before fighting back to earn a 2-2 draw in the 90+3 minute. During that match, Iranian teammates Rahman Rezaei and Ali Badavi got into a heated exchange and would each slap the other in the face before being separated by officials. After managing to advance with a 0-0 draw against eventual champions Japan, Iran made headlines before their quarterfinal match against South Korea when they missed their flight and spent the night before the match sleeping at the airport. Despite this, Iran went on to upset the favorite South Korea side, with Ali Karimi's standout performance in that match being a critical moment on his way to winning Asian Player of the Year for 2004. However, Iran's very next match against China would grab significant headlines again, due to a combination of multiple controversial calls by Lebanese referee Talaat Najm, as well as multiple notable mistakes by Iranian players.

The final in Beijing saw China lose to Japan, with a controversial handball goal by Koji Nakata that sealed the game. The win meant Japan had successfully defended their title they achieved four years ago. The outcome frustrated many Chinese supporters, who ended up rioting outside Workers' Stadium over referee's controversial decision allowing the handball goal of Koji Nakata.

== Officials ==
Referees

- (Australia) Mark Shield
- (Bahrain) Abdul Rahman Al-Delawar
- (Benin) Coffi Codjia
- (China) Lu Jun
- (Iran) Masoud Moradi
- (Japan) Toru Kamikawa
- (South Korea) Kwon Jong-chul
- (Kuwait) Saad Kamil Al-Fadhli
- (Lebanon) Talaat Najm
- (Malaysia) Subkhiddin Mohd Salleh
- (Saudi Arabia) Naser Al-Hamdan
- (Singapore) Shamsul Maidin
- (Syria) Mohammed Kousa
- (Thailand) Chaiwat Kunsata
- (United Arab Emirates) Fareed Al-Marzouqi
- (Uzbekistan) Ravshan Irmatov

Assistant Referees

- (Australia) Nathan Gibson
- (Bangladesh) Mahbubur Mahbub
- (China) Liu Tiejun
- (Hong Kong) Yau Tak Lee
- (India) Sankar Komaleeswaran
- (Indonesia) Aries Soetomo
- (Iraq) Khalil Ibrahim Abbas
- (Jordan) Fathi Arabati
- (Maldives) Mohamed Saeed
- (Oman) Ali Ahmed Al Qasimi
- (Palestine) Fayez Al Basha
- (Qatar) Ali Al Khalifi
- (Sri Lanka) Chandrajith Marasinghe
- (Turkmenistan) Begench Allaberdyev
- (Tunisia) Taoufik Adjengui
- (Vietnam) Trương Thế Toàn

== Group stage ==
All times are China standard time (UTC+8)

=== Group A ===
Pos	Team	Pld	W	D	L	GF	GA	GD	Pts	Qualification
1	China (H)	3	2	1	0	8	2	+6	7	Advance to knockout stage
2	Bahrain	3	1	2	0	6	4	+2	5	Advance to knockout stage
3	Indonesia	3	1	0	2	3	9	−6	3	
4	Qatar	3	0	1	2	2	4	−2	1	

Source: RSSSF
(H) Hosts
17 July 2004
20:00

China	2–2	Bahrain
Zheng Zhi 58' (pen.); Li Jinyu 66'	Report	M. Hubail 41'; Ali 89'

Workers' Stadium, Beijing
Attendance: 40,000
Referee: Subkhiddin Mohd Salleh (Malaysia)
18 July 2004
17:00

Qatar	1–2	Indonesia
Magid 83'	Report	Budi 26'; Ponaryo 48'

Workers' Stadium, Beijing
Attendance: 5,000
Referee: Masoud Moradi (Iran)

21 July 2004
18:30

Bahrain	1–1	Qatar
M. Hubail 90+1'	Report	Rizik 59' (pen.)

Workers' Stadium, Beijing
Attendance: 48,000
Referee: Toru Kamikawa (Japan)
21 July 2004
21:00

Indonesia	0–5	China
	Report	Shao Jiayi 25', 66'; Hao Haidong 40'; Li Ming 51'; Li Yi 80'

Workers' Stadium, Beijing
Attendance: 48,000
Referee: Talaat Najm (Lebanon)

25 July 2004
19:00

China	1–0	Qatar
Xu Yunlong 77'	Report

Workers' Stadium, Beijing
Attendance: 60,000
Referee: Masoud Moradi (Iran)
25 July 2004
19:00

Bahrain	3–1	Indonesia
Ali 43'; A. Hubail 57'; Yousef 82'	Report	Elie 75'

Shandong Sports Center, Jinan
Attendance: 20,000
Referee: Coffi Codjia (Benin)

=== Group B ===
Pos	Team	Pld	W	D	L	GF	GA	GD	Pts	Qualification
1	South Korea	3	2	1	0	6	0	+6	7	Advance to knockout stage
2	Jordan	3	1	2	0	2	0	+2	5	Advance to knockout stage
3	Kuwait	3	1	0	2	3	7	−4	3	
4	United Arab Emirates	3	0	1	2	1	5	−4	1	

Source: RSSSF
19 July 2004
18:30

South Korea	0–0	Jordan
	Report

Shandong Sports Center, Jinan
Attendance: 26,000
Referee: Shamsul Maidin (Singapore)
19 July 2004
21:00

Kuwait	3–1	United Arab Emirates
B. Abdullah 24'; Al-Mutawa 39' (pen.); Saeed 45' (o.g.)	Report; Report	Rashid 47'

Shandong Sports Center, Jinan
Attendance: 31,250
Referee: Naser Al-Hamdan (Saudi Arabia)

23 July 2004
18:30

Jordan	2–0	Kuwait
Saad 90+1'; Al-Zboun 90+2'	Report

Shandong Sports Center, Jinan
Attendance: 28,000
Referee: Lu Jun (China)
23 July 2004
21:00

United Arab Emirates	0–2	South Korea
	Report	Lee Dong-gook 41'; Ahn Jung-hwan 90+1'

Shandong Sports Center, Jinan
Attendance: 30,000
Referee: Ravshan Irmatov (Uzbekistan)

27 July 2004
19:00

Jordan	0–0	United Arab Emirates
	Report

Workers' Stadium, Beijing
Attendance: 25,000
Referee: Talaat Najm (Lebanon)
27 July 2004
19:00

South Korea	4–0	Kuwait
Lee Dong-gook 25', 41'; Cha Du-ri 45+1'; Ahn Jung-hwan 75'	Report

Shandong Sports Center, Jinan
Attendance: 15,000
Referee: Shamsul Maidin (Singapore)

=== Group C ===
Pos	Team	Pld	W	D	L	GF	GA	GD	Pts	Qualification
1	Uzbekistan	3	3	0	0	3	0	+3	9	Advance to knockout stage
2	Iraq	3	2	0	1	5	4	+1	6	Advance to knockout stage
3	Turkmenistan	3	0	1	2	4	6	−2	1	
4	Saudi Arabia	3	0	1	2	3	5	−2	1	

Source: RSSSF
18 July 2004
18:45

Saudi Arabia	2–2	Turkmenistan
Al-Qahtani 9' (pen.), 59'	Report	N. Baýramow 6'; Kulyýew 90+3'

Sichuan Longquanyi Stadium, Chengdu
Attendance: 12,400
Referee: Chaiwat Kunsata (Thailand)
18 July 2004
21:15

Iraq	0–1	Uzbekistan
	Report	Qosimov 21'

Sichuan Longquanyi Stadium, Chengdu
Attendance: 12,400
Referee: Kwon Jong-chul (South Korea)

22 July 2004
18:30

Turkmenistan	2–3	Iraq
W. Baýramow 14'; Kulyýew 85'	Report	H. M. Mohammed 12'; Farhan 80'; Munir 88'

Sichuan Longquanyi Stadium, Chengdu
Attendance: 22,000
Referee: Saad Kamil Al-Fadhli (Kuwait)
22 July 2004
21:00

Uzbekistan	1–0	Saudi Arabia
Geynrikh 13'	Report

Sichuan Longquanyi Stadium, Chengdu
Attendance: 22,000
Referee: Coffi Codjia (Benin)

26 July 2004
19:00

Saudi Arabia	1–2	Iraq
Al-Montashari 57'	Report	Akram 51'; Mahmoud 86'

Sichuan Longquanyi Stadium, Chengdu
Attendance: 15,000
Referee: Kwon Jong-chul (South Korea)
26 July 2004
19:00

Turkmenistan	0–1	Uzbekistan
	Report	Qosimov 58'

Chongqing Olympic Sports Center, Chongqing
Attendance: 34,000
Referee: Mohammed Kousa (Syria)

=== Group D ===
Pos	Team	Pld	W	D	L	GF	GA	GD	Pts	Qualification
1	Japan	3	2	1	0	5	1	+4	7	Advance to knockout stage
2	Iran	3	1	2	0	5	2	+3	5	Advance to knockout stage
3	Oman	3	1	1	1	4	3	+1	4	
4	Thailand	3	0	0	3	1	9	−8	0	

Source: RSSSF
20 July 2004
18:00

Japan	1–0	Oman
Nakamura 33'	Report

Chongqing Olympic Sports Center, Chongqing
Attendance: 35,000
Referee: Mark Shield (Australia)
20 July 2004
20:30

Iran	3–0	Thailand
Enayati 71'; Nekounam 80'; Daei 86' (pen.)	Report

Chongqing Olympic Sports Center, Chongqing
Attendance: 37,000
Referee: Mohammad Kousa (Syria)

24 July 2004
18:00

Oman	2–2	Iran
Al-Hosni 31', 40'	Report	Karimi 61'; Nosrati 90+4'

Chongqing Olympic Sports Center, Chongqing
Attendance: 35,000
Referee: Abdul Rahman Al-Delawar (Bahrain)
24 July 2004
20:30

Thailand	1–4	Japan
Sutee 12'	Report	Nakamura 21'; Nakazawa 57', 87'; Fukunishi 68'

Chongqing Olympic Sports Center, Chongqing
Attendance: 45,000
Referee: Fareed Al-Marzouqi (UAE)

28 July 2004
18:15

Oman	2–0	Thailand
Rangsan 15' (o.g.); Al-Hosni 49'	Report

Sichuan Longquanyi Stadium, Chengdu
Attendance: 13,000
Referee: Lu Jun (China)
28 July 2004
18:15

Japan	0–0	Iran
	Report

Chongqing Olympic Sports Center, Chongqing
Attendance: 52,000
Referee: Mark Shield (Australia)

== Knockout stage ==
All times are China standard time (UTC+8)

Quarter-finals
30 July – Beijing
China	3
Iraq	0
31 July – Jinan
South Korea	3
Iran	4
30 July – Chengdu
Uzbekistan	2 (3)
Bahrain (p)	2 (4)
31 July – Chongqing
Japan (p)	1 (4)
Jordan	1 (3)

Semi-finals
3 August – Beijing
China (p)	1 (4)
Iran	1 (3)
3 August – Jinan
Bahrain	3
Japan (a.e.t.)	4

Final
7 August – Beijing
China	1
Japan	3
Third place
6 August – Beijing
Iran	4
Bahrain	2

=== Quarter-finals ===
30 July 2004
18:00

Uzbekistan	2–2 (a.e.t.)	Bahrain
Geynrikh 60'; Shishelov 86'	Report	A. Hubail 71', 76'
Penalties
Fyodorov (penalty scored); Djeperov (penalty scored); Geynrikh (penalty scored); Bikmaev (penalty missed); Koshelev (penalty missed)	3–4	(penalty scored) Ali; (penalty missed) Juma; (penalty scored) Baba; (penalty scored) Farhan; (penalty scored) A. Hubail

Sichuan Longquanyi Stadium, Chengdu
Attendance: 18,000
Referee: Kwon Jong-chul (South Korea)

30 July 2004
21:00

China	3–0	Iraq
Hao Haidong 8'; Zheng Zhi 81' (pen.), 90+2' (pen.)	Report

Workers' Stadium, Beijing
Attendance: 60,000
Referee: Shamsul Maidin (Singapore)

31 July 2004
18:00

Japan	1–1 (a.e.t.)	Jordan
Suzuki 14'	Report	Shelbaieh 11'
Penalties
Nakamura (penalty missed); Alex (penalty missed); Fukunishi (penalty scored); Nakata (penalty scored); Suzuki (penalty scored); Nakazawa (penalty missed); Miyamoto (penalty scored)	4–3	(penalty scored) Abu Zema; (penalty scored) Al-Awadat; (penalty scored) Aqel; (penalty missed) Al-Shboul; (penalty missed) Ibrahim; (penalty missed) Al-Zboun; (penalty missed) Bani Yaseen

Chongqing Olympic Sports Center, Chongqing
Attendance: 52,000
Referee: Subkhiddin Mohd Salleh (Malaysia)

31 July 2004
21:00

South Korea	3–4	Iran
Seol Ki-hyeon 16'; Lee Dong-gook 25'; Kim Nam-il 68'	Report	Karimi 10', 20', 77'; Park Jin-seop 51' (o.g.)

Shandong Sports Center, Jinan
Attendance: 20,000
Referee: Saad Kamil Al-Fadhli (Kuwait)

=== Semi-finals ===
3 August 2004
18:00

Bahrain	3–4 (a.e.t./s.g.)	Japan
A. Hubail 7', 71'; Naser 85'	Report	Nakata 48'; Tamada 55', 93'; Nakazawa 90'

Shandong Sports Center, Jinan
Attendance: 32,000
Referee: Shamsul Maidin (Singapore)

3 August 2004
21:00

China	1–1 (a.e.t.)	Iran
Shao Jiayi 18'	Report	Alavi 38'
Penalties
Zheng Zhi (penalty scored); Zhao Junzhe (penalty missed); Li Xiaopeng (penalty scored); Sun Xiang (penalty scored); Shao Jiayi (penalty scored)	4–3	(penalty scored) Daei; (penalty scored) Mahdavikia; (penalty scored) Nekounam; (penalty missed) Mobali; (penalty missed) Golmohammadi

Workers' Stadium, Beijing
Attendance: 55,000
Referee: Talaat Najm (Lebanon)

=== Third place playoff ===
6 August 2004
20:00

Iran	4–2	Bahrain
Nekounam 9'; Karimi 52'; Daei 80' (pen.), 90'	Report	Yousef 48'; Farhan 57'

Workers' Stadium, Beijing
Attendance: 10,000
Referee: Fareed Al-Marzouqi (United Arab Emirates)

=== Final ===
7 August 2004
20:00

China	1–3	Japan
Li Ming 31'	Report	Fukunishi 22'; Nakata 65'; Tamada 90+1'

Workers' Stadium, Beijing
Attendance: 62,000
Referee: Saad Kamil Al-Fadhli (Kuwait)

== Statistics ==
=== Goalscorers ===
With five goals, A'ala Hubail and Ali Karimi are the top scorers in the tournament. In total, 96 goals were scored by 58 different players, with two of them credited as own goals.

5 goals

- (Bahrain) A'ala Hubail
- (Iran) Ali Karimi

4 goals

- (South Korea) Lee Dong-gook

3 goals

- (China) Shao Jiayi
- (China) Zheng Zhi
- (Iran) Ali Daei
- (Japan) Yuji Nakazawa
- (Japan) Keiji Tamada
- (Oman) Imad Al-Hosni

2 goals

- (Bahrain) Husain Ali
- (Bahrain) Mohamed Hubail
- (Bahrain) Talal Yousef
- (China) Hao Haidong
- (China) Li Ming
- (Iran) Javad Nekounam
- (Japan) Takashi Fukunishi
- (Japan) Shunsuke Nakamura
- (Japan) Koji Nakata
- (South Korea) Ahn Jung-hwan
- (Saudi Arabia) Yasser Al-Qahtani
- (Turkmenistan) Begençmuhammet Kulyýew
- (Uzbekistan) Alexander Geynrikh
- (Uzbekistan) Mirjalol Qosimov

1 goal

- (Bahrain) Saleh Farhan
- (Bahrain) Duaij Naser
- (China) Li Jinyu
- (China) Li Yi
- (China) Xu Yunlong
- (Indonesia) Elie Aiboy
- (Indonesia) Ponaryo Astaman
- (Indonesia) Budi Sudarsono
- (Iran) Mohammad Alavi
- (Iran) Reza Enayati
- (Iran) Mohammad Nosrati
- (Iraq) Nashat Akram
- (Iraq) Razzaq Farhan
- (Iraq) Younis Mahmoud
- (Iraq) Hawar Mulla Mohammed
- (Iraq) Qusay Munir
- (Japan) Takayuki Suzuki
- (Jordan) Anas Al-Zboun
- (Jordan) Khaled Saad
- (Jordan) Mahmoud Shelbaieh
- (South Korea) Cha Du-ri
- (South Korea) Seol Ki-hyeon
- (South Korea) Kim Nam-il
- (Kuwait) Bashar Abdullah
- (Kuwait) Bader Al-Mutawa
- (Qatar) Magid Mohamed
- (Qatar) Wesam Rizik
- (Saudi Arabia) Hamad Al-Montashari
- (Thailand) Sutee Suksomkit
- (Turkmenistan) Nazar Baýramow
- (Turkmenistan) Wladimir Baýramow
- (United Arab Emirates) Mohamed Rashid
- (Uzbekistan) Vladimir Shishelov

Own goals

- (South Korea) Park Jin-seop (1) (for Iran)
- (Thailand) Rangsan Viwatchaichok (1) (for Oman)
- (United Arab Emirates) Basheer Saeed (1) (for Kuwait)

== Awards ==
Most Valuable Player

- (Japan) Shunsuke Nakamura

Top Scorer

- (Bahrain) A'ala Hubail
- (Iran) Ali Karimi

Fair-Play Award

- China

Team of the Tournament

Goalkeepers	Defenders	Midfielders	Forwards
(Japan) Yoshikatsu Kawaguchi	(Japan) Tsuneyasu Miyamoto (China) Zheng Zhi (Japan) Yuji Nakazawa	(Iran) Mehdi Mahdavikia (China) Zhao Junzhe (Japan) Shunsuke Nakamura (Bahrain) Talal Yousef (China) Shao Jiayi	(Iran) Ali Karimi (Bahrain) A'ala Hubail

== Marketing ==
=== Official match ball ===
The official match ball for the tournament was the Adidas Roteiro.

=== Mascot ===
The tournament's mascot was Bei Bei, a monkey character based on Journey to the West's Sun Wukong.

=== Official song ===
The AFC selected "宣言 (Declaration)", "Take Me To The Sky" (English Version Title) by Chinese singer Tiger Hu as the tournament's official song.

== Controversies ==
Like other sports events, the Asian Cup 2004 was publicised as evidence of China's economic and athletic progress, being referred to by some as a prelude to the 2008 Summer Olympics. Many Chinese see the tournament as a success and take great pride in having showcased such an important sporting event in advance of the Olympic Games. However, the Japanese media and many other international observers have pointed out bad manners on the part of Chinese fans, and sparse attendance at the tournament, raising questions on China's ability to hold such sporting events.

There was also significant controversy over the refereeing of various matches in the tournament relating to the host China PR, specifically on China 3-0 Iraq and China 1-1 Iran. The match between China and Iraq featured a controversial penalty awarded to Zheng Zhi, while the two red cards awarded to Iran and the neglection of Zhang Yaokun's deliberate violent conduct during the second half of the match was also questioned by authorities such as the head coach of Islamic Republic of Iran.

Throughout the tournament, most Chinese fans in the stadia expressed anti-Japanese sentiments by drowning out the Japanese national anthem, displaying political banners and booing whenever Japan got the ball, regardless of the score or opponent. This was reported by the international media, and was aggravated when Koji Nakata apparently knocked in the ball with his right hand in the final. The PRC government responded by calling for restraint and increasing police numbers to maintain order. The Japanese government also called on the PRC to ensure the safety of Japanese fans, while specifically asking Japanese nationals or people of Japanese origin to not display any form of excessive pride. Despite the Chinese government's campaign, a riot started by Chinese fans broke out near the north gate of the Workers' Stadium, though reports differ as to the extent of the riot. As a result, some media groups have said that displays of "excessive Chinese nationalism during the Beijing 2008 Summer Olympics have become a cause for concern for Chinese officials".
