= Salman Isa =

Bahraini footballer (born 1977)

Personal information
- Full name: Salman Isa Ghuloom
- Date of birth: 12 July 1977 (age 49)
- Place of birth: Bahrain
- Height: 1.75 m (5 ft 9 in)
- Positions: Wingback; winger

Senior career*
| Years | Team | Apps | (Gls) |
| 1996–1998 | Madinat Isa | | |
| 1998–2004 | Al Riffa | | |
| 2005–2011 | Al-Arabi | 67 | (9) |
| 2011–2015 | Al Riffa | | |
| 2015–2016 | Manama Club | 2 | (0) |

International career^{‡}
| 2001–2012 | Bahrain | 160 | (25) |
- * Club domestic league appearances and goals as of 17 October 2011 ‡ National team caps and goals as of 8 November 2012

Salman Isa Ghuloom (Arabic: سَلْمَان عِيسَى غُلُوم; born 12 July 1977), known to many as just Salman Isa, is a retired Bahraini footballer who played as a winger or a wingback.

== World Cup Qualifiers ==
Salman is noted for scoring for Bahrain in the Asia-Concacaf playoff qualifier for the 2006 FIFA World Cup in Germany against Trinidad and Tobago. In doing so he gave Bahrain the lead, playing away at Port of Spain in the first leg. That gave Bahrain the advantage to qualify for the World Cup, but Trinidad's Chris Birchall equalized to end the match. In the second Leg in Bahrain, Dennis Lawrence scored to give Trinidad and Tobago the win and help them qualify for the 2006 FIFA World Cup, for the first time in their history.

== Club career ==
Ghuloom has played for a number of clubs during his footballing career. At 28 he is a very experienced footballer. Ghuloom started his career at small first division (the 2nd tier of Bahraini football) club Isa Town or Madinat Isa. This club produced former Bahrain national team captain, and Ghuloom's teammate, Talal Yousif. Ghuloom's excellent performance for the club prompted one of the three big Bahraini clubs, Al Riffa, to sign him along with Isa Town teammate Talal Yousef. After signing for Al Riffa he made a huge impact helping them to the Bahraini Premiership title in 2002–2003. During his time at Al Riffa he played under Bahraini Manager Riyadh Al Thawadi who would go on to manage the Bahrain national team for one match against Kuwait. Salman Isa plays his trade for Al-Arabi of Qatar currently and is one of the most consistent players at the club.

== Glory Days ==
Ghuloom is known for his hardworking and tireless displays on the wing, but as Talal Yousif who was deployed as a more offensive player for Al Riffa left for Kuwait SC, Riyadh Al Thawadi decided to push Ghuloom upfield and play him as a forward. This decision proved to be vital as Ghuloom scored 15 goals as a striker, leaving him as the league's top scorer. Ghuloom's amazing form also helped Al Riffa to the 2004–2005 league championship and the Crown Prince Cup. In which Ghuloom scored in the final. Ghuloom's best for the national team came in the 2004 Gulf Arabian Cup in Qatar. Ghuloom scored an amazing goal in the historic 3–0 win over Bahrain's fierce rivals and neighbors, the more famous Saudi Arabia. Ghuloom's hardworking ethics paid off as Bahrain again qualified for the semi-finals although they were knocked out by Oman. Nevertheless, Bahrain still finished in third place. After the 2004–2005 season Ghuloom's amazing displays prompted Al Arabi of Qatar, where fellow national team player and captain Mohamed Salmeen plays, to sign Ghuloom from then Bahraini champions Al Riffa. At Al Riffa Ghuloom was a cult hero and fans referred to him as "AL JANAH AL TAER" which means the flying wing, for his speedy runs through the wings. At Al Arabi, Ghuloom continued to display good form although there he was being used mostly as a defender or wing back. Currently Salman Isa is defending the colors of Al-Arabi and is the captain of the club.

== International career ==
=== Asian Cup 2004 ===
In 2004 Bahrain qualified for the 2004 AFC Asian Cup in China. Although Salman missed the many games of the tournament due to injury, he still managed to play a few matches in Bahrain's run to the semi-finals. After the Asian Cup, most of the members of the national team were signed by big Qatari clubs such as Al Gharafa, Al Arabi, and Al Rayyan. Team players such as Mohamed Ahmed Salmeen and Alaa Hubail moved on to Qatar. While others like Talal Yousif for instance decided to move to Kuwait. After this The Bahraini Premiership appeared to have lost some of its most important players. Although the loss of many national team members meant the rise of Salman.

== Career statistics ==
=== International ===
Scores and results list Bahrain's goal tally first, score column indicates score after each Isa goal.

List of international goals scored by Salman Isa
| No. | Date | Venue | Opponent | Score | Result | Competition | Ref. |
|---|---|---|---|---|---|---|---|
| 1 | 27 January 2002 | King Fahd International Stadium, Riyadh, Saudi Arabia | United Arab Emirates | 2-1 | 2-1 | 15th Arabian Gulf Cup | |
| 2 | 12 December 2003 | Bahrain National Stadium, Riffa, Bahrain | Iraq | 1-0 | 2-2 | 2003 Bahrain Prime Minister's Cup | |
| 3 | 31 May 2004 | Maktoum bin Rashid Al Maktoum Stadium, Dubai, United Arab Emirates | United Arab Emirates | 1-0 | 3-2 | Friendly | |
| 4 | 17 December 2004 | Ahmad bin Ali Stadium, Al Rayyan, Qatar | Saudi Arabia | 2-0 | 3-0 | 17th Arabian Gulf Cup | |
| 5 | 23 December 2004 | Jassim bin Hamad Stadium, Doha, Qatar | Kuwait | — | 3-1 | 17th Arabian Gulf Cup | |
| 6 | 17 August 2005 | Bahrain National Stadium, Riffa, Bahrain | North Korea | 1-2 | 2-3 | 2006 FIFA World Cup qualification | |
| 7 | 12 November 2005 | Hasely Crawford Stadium, Port of Spain, Trinidad and Tobago | Trinidad and Tobago | 1-0 | 1-1 | 2006 FIFA World Cup qualification | |
| 8 | 15 November 2006 | Bahrain National Stadium, Riffa, Bahrain | Kuwait | 2-0 | 2-1 | 2007 AFC Asian Cup qualification | |
| 9 | 15 July 2007 | Gelora Bung Karno Stadium, Jakarta, Indonesia | South Korea | 1-1 | 2-1 | 2007 AFC Asian Cup | |
| 10 | 16 October 2007 | Al Muharraq Stadium, Arad, Bahrain | Libya | 1-0 | 2-0 | Friendly | |
| 11 | 16 October 2007 | Al Muharraq Stadium, Arad, Bahrain | Libya | 2-0 | 2-0 | Friendly | |
| 12 | 4 March 2008 | Jassim bin Hamad Stadium, Doha, Qatar | Qatar | 1-1 | 2-1 | Friendly | |
| 13 | 2 June 2008 | Rajamangala Stadium, Bangkok, Thailand | Thailand | 1-0 | 3-2 | 2010 FIFA World Cup qualification | |
| 14 | 7 June 2008 | Bahrain National Stadium, Riffa, Bahrain | Thailand | 1-1 | 1-1 | 2010 FIFA World Cup qualification | |
| 15 | 20 August 2008 | Bahrain National Stadium, Riffa, Bahrain | Burkina Faso | 2-0 | 3-1 | Friendly | |
| 16 | 6 September 2008 | Bahrain National Stadium, Riffa, Bahrain | Japan | 1-3 | 2-3 | 2010 FIFA World Cup qualification | |
| 17 | 29 December 2008 | Bahrain National Stadium, Riffa, Bahrain | Syria | 1-1 | 2-2 | Friendly | |
| 18 | 21 January 2009 | Hong Kong Stadium, Causeway Bay, Hong Kong | Hong Kong | 3-0 | 3-1 | 2011 AFC Asian Cup qualification | |
| 19 | 28 January 2009 | Bahrain National Stadium, Riffa, Bahrain | Japan | 1-0 | 1-0 | 2011 AFC Asian Cup qualification | |
| 20 | 31 August 2009 | Bahrain National Stadium, Riffa, Bahrain | Iran | 3-1 | 4-2 | Friendly | |
| 21 | 8 October 2010 | Jaber Al-Ahmad International Stadium, Kuwait City, Kuwait | Kuwait | 3-0 | 3-1 | Friendly | |
| 22 | 25 December 2010 | Zabeel Stadium, Dubai, United Arab Emirates | Uzbekistan | 1-1 | 1-1 | Friendly | |
| 23 | 20 December 2011 | Thani bin Jassim Stadium, Al Rayyan, Qatar | Palestine | 2-1 | 3-1 | 2011 Arab Games | |
| 24 | 8 November 2012 | Bahrain National Stadium, Riffa, Bahrain | Jordan | 1-0 | 3-0 | Friendly | |

== See also ==
- List of men's footballers with 100 or more international caps
