= Begençmuhammet Kulyýew =

Turkmen footballer

Begenchmuhammed Kuliyev
Personal information
- Full name: Begenchmuhammed Nuryagdyevich Kuliyev
- Date of birth: 4 April 1977 (age 49)
- Place of birth: Ashkhabad, Turkmen SSR, Soviet Union
- Height: 1.77 m (5 ft 10 in)
- Position: Midfielder

Senior career*
Years	Team	Apps	(Gls)
1997–2000	FK Köpetdag Aşgabat		
2000–2004	Nisa Aşgabat		
2001–2002	FC Kristall Smolensk	15	(0)
2003	FC Shakhter Karagandy	54	(4)
2004	FC Vostok	3	(0)
2004	Nisa Aşgabat		
2004–2005	F.C. Aboumoslem		
2007–2010	FC Aşgabat		

International career
1997–2006	Turkmenistan	24	(8)
- * Club domestic league appearances and goals

Begenchmuhammed Kuliyev (Turkmen: Begençmuhammet Nurýagdyýewiç Kuliýew, born 4 April 1977 in Soviet Union) is a Turkmen former professional football player. He was the top goal scorer of the Turkmenistan national football team in 2004.

Kulyýew previously played for FC Kristall Smolensk in the Russian Football National League during the 2001 season. He also coached FK Arkadag in 2023.

== International career statistics ==
=== Goals for Senior National Team ===
#	Date	Venue	Opponent	Score	Result	Competition
1.	19 November 2003	Ashgabat, Turkmenistan	Afghanistan	11–0	Won	2006 FIFA World Cup qualification
2.	19 November 2003	Ashgabat, Turkmenistan	Afghanistan	11–0	Won	2006 FIFA World Cup qualification
3.	19 November 2003	Ashgabat, Turkmenistan	Afghanistan	11–0	Won	2006 FIFA World Cup qualification
4.	23 November 2003	Kabul, Afghanistan	Afghanistan	2–0	Won	2006 FIFA World Cup qualification
5.	23 November 2003	Kabul, Afghanistan	Afghanistan	2–0	Won	2006 FIFA World Cup qualification
6.	31 March 2004	Ashgabat, Turkmenistan	Indonesia	3–1	Won	2006 FIFA World Cup qualification
7.	18 July 2004	Chengdu, China	Saudi Arabia	2–2	Draw	2004 AFC Asian Cup
8.	22 July 2004	Chengdu, China	Iraq	2–3	Lost	2004 AFC Asian Cup
