= 17th Arabian Gulf Cup =

International football tournament in 2004

كأس الخليج العربي 2004, او خليجي 17 Kass Al-Khaleej Al-Arabi 2004, or Khaleeji 17

Tournament details
- Host country: Qatar
- Dates: 10–24 December
- Teams: 8
- Venues: 2 (in 1 host city)

Final positions
- Champions: Qatar (2nd title)
- Runners-up: Oman
- Third place: Bahrain
- Fourth place: Kuwait

Tournament statistics
- Matches played: 16
- Goals scored: 52 (3.25 per match)
- Top scorer: (Oman) Imad Al-Hosni (4 goals)
- Best player: (Bahrain) Talal Yousef
- Best goalkeeper: (Oman) Ali Al-Habsi

The 17th Arabian Gulf Cup (Arabic: كأس الخليج العربي) was the 17th international association football championship for the national teams of the Arabian Peninsula and bordering the Persian Gulf. Hosted by Qatar, the competition ran from 10 to 24 December 2004 and was contested by the national teams of Bahrain, Iraq, Kuwait, Oman, Qatar, Saudi Arabia, the United Arab Emirates and Yemen.

Hosts Qatar and Oman contested the final. Qatar defeated Oman 5–4 on penalties to win the competition. In the third-place play-off, Bahrain defeated Kuwait 3–1.

== Background ==
The first edition of the biennial Arabian Gulf Cup was held in Isa Town, Bahrain in 1970. Saudi Arabia were the defending champions after winning the previous edition in 2003–04. Kuwait were the most successful team in the history of the competition having won the trophy on nine previous occasions.

Iraq contested the Arabian Gulf Cup for the first time since the outbreak of the Gulf War in 1980 following the fall of Saddam Hussein.

== Format ==
In total, eight teams took part in the competition. They were drawn into two single round robin groups of four teams. The winners and runners-up would then contest the semi-finals which would decide the teams contesting the final and third-place play-off.

=== Participants ===
- Bahrain
- Iraq
- Kuwait
- Oman
- Qatar
- Saudi Arabia
- United Arab Emirates
- Yemen

== Venues ==
All matches were played at the Al-Rayyan Stadium and the Jassim bin Hamad Stadium in Al Rayyan, Qatar.

Al Rayyan		Location of the host cities of the 17th Arabian Gulf Cup.
Al-Rayyan Stadium	Jassim bin Hamad Stadium	Location of the host cities of the 17th Arabian Gulf Cup.
Capacity: 25,000	Capacity: 12,000	Location of the host cities of the 17th Arabian Gulf Cup.

== Group stage ==
=== Group A ===
Oman and Qatar advanced to the semi-finals.

==== Table ====
Team	Pts	Pld	W	D	L	GF	GA	GD
Oman	6	3	2	0	1	6	4	+2
Qatar	5	3	1	2	0	7	6	+1
United Arab Emirates	2	3	0	2	1	4	5	−1
Iraq	2	3	0	2	1	5	7	−2

==== Matches ====
10 December 2004
22:30

Iraq	1–3	Oman
Farhan 56'		Al-Hosni 29', 46'; Al-Noufali 53'

Jassim bin Hamad Stadium, Al Rayyan
10 December 2004
20:30

Qatar	2–2	United Arab Emirates
Jassem 90'; Rizik 90+3'		Khater 41' (pen.); Matar 83'

Jassim bin Hamad Stadium, Al Rayyan

13 December 2004
17:30

Oman	2–1	United Arab Emirates
Al-Gheilani 74'; Al-Maimani 85'		Masoud 45+1'

Jassim bin Hamad Stadium, Al Rayyan
13 December 2004
19:30

Qatar	3–3	Iraq
Mohammed 38'; Jassem 43' (pen.), 57'		Farhan 16'; Akram 54'; Abdul-Amir 90+2'

Jassim bin Hamad Stadium, Al Rayyan

16 December 2004
17:30

United Arab Emirates	1–1	Iraq
Khalil 68'		Munir 90+2' (pen.)

Al-Rayyan Stadium, Al Rayyan
16 December 2004
17:30

Qatar	2–1	Oman
Al-Shammari 10'; Bechir 27'		Kamounah 26'

Jassim bin Hamad Stadium, Al Rayyan

=== Group B ===
Kuwait and Bahrain advanced to the semi-finals.

==== Table ====
Team	Pts	Pld	W	D	L	GF	GA	GD
Kuwait	7	3	2	1	0	6	2	+4
Bahrain	5	3	1	2	0	5	2	+3
Saudi Arabia	3	3	1	0	2	3	5	−2
Yemen	1	3	0	1	2	1	6	−5

==== Matches ====
11 December 2004
17:30

Yemen	1–1	Bahrain
Ghazi 47'		Yousef 26'

Al-Rayyan Stadium, Al Rayyan
11 December 2004
19:30

Saudi Arabia	1–2	Kuwait
Al-Qahtani 14'		Neda 75'; Al-Mutawa 87'

Al-Rayyan Stadium, Al Rayyan
Referee: Terje Hauge (Norway)

14 December 2004
17:30

Kuwait	1–1	Bahrain
Jarragh 16'		Husain Ali 45+1'

Al-Rayyan Stadium, Al Rayyan
14 December 2004
19:30

Yemen	0–2	Saudi Arabia
		Al-Otaibi 34'; Suwayed 47' (pen.)

Al-Rayyan Stadium, Al Rayyan
Referee: Jassim Al Hail (Qatar)

17 December 2004
17:30

Bahrain	3–0	Saudi Arabia
Al-Marzooqi 64'; Isa 78'; Yousef 90'

Al-Rayyan Stadium, Al Rayyan
Referee: Luis Medina (Spain)
17 December 2004
17:30

Kuwait	3–0	Yemen
Abdullah 18', 90+1'; Al-Mutawa 81'

Jassim bin Hamad Stadium, Al Rayyan

== Semi-finals ==
A brace from Imad Al-Hosni helped Oman to a 3–2 win against Bahrain and goals from Sayed Ali Bechir and Nasir Kamil saw Qatar defeat Kuwait 2–0.

20 December 2004
17:30

Oman	3–2	Bahrain
Al-Hosni 44', 83'; Al-Maimani 50'		Jalal 51'; Abdulla 64'

Jassim bin Hamad Stadium, Al Rayyan

20 December 2004
20:30

Kuwait	0–2	Qatar
		Bechir 39'; Kamil 90' (pen.)

Jassim bin Hamad Stadium, Al Rayyan

== Third-place play-off ==
Goals from A'ala Hubail and Duaij Naser Abdulla helped Bahrain to a 3–1 win against Kuwait.

23 December 2004
17:30

Bahrain	3–1	Kuwait
Neda 31' (o.g.); Hubail 56'; Abdulla 90+1'		Khedhair 34'

Jassim bin Hamad Stadium, Al Rayyan

== Final ==
After a 1–1 draw, Qatar defeated Oman 5–4 on penalties to win the competition.

24 December 2004
19:30

Oman	1–1	Qatar
Al-Maimani 26'		Rizik 4'
Penalties
	4–5

Jassim bin Hamad Stadium, Al Rayyan
