= Talal Yousef =

Bahraini footballer (born 1975)

Personal information
- Full name: Talal Yousef Ahmed bin Yateem
- Date of birth: 24 February 1975 (age 51)
- Place of birth: Bahrain
- Height: 1.73 m (5 ft 8 in)
- Position: Midfielder

Team information
- Current team: Al-Riffa

Senior career*
Years	Team	Apps	(Gls)
1992–2004	Al Riffa		
2004–2007	Al Kuwait Kaifan		
2007–2008	Al Qadisiya Kuwait		
2008–2011	Al-Riffa		

International career^{‡}
1998–2009	Bahrain	81	(23)
- * Club domestic league appearances and goals ‡ National team caps and goals as of 17 October 2011

Talal Yousef Mohammed (born 24 February 1975), known mainly as Talal Yousef, is a former Bahraini footballer.

Yousef played mainly as an attacking midfielder and sometimes as a striker. He is currently retired from playing with the Bahrain national football team, where he made 21 appearances in FIFA World Cup qualifying matches.

== Early career ==
Talal started his career with Isa Town, where he also captained. He met Salman Isa, another legend of Bahraini football, at the club. After some amazing performances, he was noticed by Bahrain Riffa Club. They signed him along with Isa for an undisclosed fee.

== Al Riffa Club ==
After signing for Al Riffa (Riffa Club), Talal Yousef made a huge impact. He helped them to the league title and the Crown Prince Cup and established himself as the superstar of Al Riffa.

== Asian Cup ==
During the 2004 Asian Cup, Talal Yousef peaked and put on his best performances. He scored two goals, one coming from his trademark free kick against fierce rivals Iran in the 3rd and 4th place playoff. Talal Yousif was named in the team of the tournament along with fellow Bahraini's A'ala Hubail, who was joint top scorer, and Mohamed Salmeen .In this tournament the Bahraini National Team had their best ever performance at a major tournament as they reached the semi-finals. Talal Yousif was a major part of that success and after the tournament he was named Captain of the National team.

== Kuwait ==
After the Asian Cup success, many of Bahrain's top players headed for Qatar although Talal opted for a move to Kuwait. He was later joined by Bahraini defender Hussain Ali Baba, also a former Al Riffa player. When Kuwait SC did not renew his contract, he then signed with Qadsiya for the 2007/08 season.

== Awards ==
- 2004 Asian Cup – All-Star Team

== Retirement ==
Talal announced his official retirement from International Football in January 2006, then was convinced to return and helped Bahrain qualify for the Asian Cup 2007. He also stayed on for the 18th & 19th GCC Cup's and then announced his final retirement from International Competitions.

=== Goals for Senior National Team ===
#	Date	Venue	Opponent	Score	Result	Competition
	12 November 1998	Manama, Bahrain	Oman	2–2	Draw	14th Arabian Gulf Cup
	30 December 2003	Kuwait City, Kuwait	Yemen	5–1	Won	16th Arabian Gulf Cup
	7 January 2004	Kuwait City, Kuwait	United Arab Emirates	3–1	Won	16th Arabian Gulf Cup
	7 January 2004	Kuwait City, Kuwait	United Arab Emirates	3–1	Won	16th Arabian Gulf Cup
	10 January 2004	Kuwait City, Kuwait	Kuwait	4–0	Won	16th Arabian Gulf Cup
	10 January 2004	Kuwait City, Kuwait	Kuwait	4–0	Won	16th Arabian Gulf Cup
	25 July 2004	Jinan, China	Indonesia	3–1	Won	2004 AFC Asian Cup
	6 August 2004	Beijing, China	Iran	2–4	Lost	2004 AFC Asian Cup
	13 October 2004	Damascus, Syria	Syria	2–2	Draw	2006 FIFA World Cup qualification
	17 November 2004	Manama, Bahrain	Tajikistan	4–0	Won	2006 FIFA World Cup qualification
	11 December 2004	Doha, Qatar	Yemen	1–1	Draw	17th Arabian Gulf Cup
	17 December 2004	Doha, Qatar	Saudi Arabia	3–0	Won	17th Arabian Gulf Cup
	8 October 2005	Tashkent, Uzbekistan	Uzbekistan	1–1	Draw	2006 FIFA World Cup qualification
	15 November 2006	Manama, Bahrain	Kuwait	2–1	Won	2007 AFC Asian Cup qualification
	12 January 2007	Dubai, UAE	Yemen	4–0	Won	Friendly
	18 January 2007	Abu Dhabi, UAE	Saudi Arabia	1–2	Lost	17th Arabian Gulf Cup
