= Mohamed Juma (footballer) =

Bahraini footballer

Mohamed Juma Basheer Abdulla Ghanem (born 13 December 1973) is a Bahraini former footballer who played as a defender for Bahrain in the 2004 AFC Asian Cup. He played club football for Al-Hala SC, Busaiteen Club and Al-Khor SC.
