= Sayed Mahmood Jalal =

Bahraini footballer (born 1980)

Personal information
- Full name: Sayed Mahmood Jalal Ibrahim Al Wadaei
- Date of birth: 5 November 1980 (age 45)
- Place of birth: Bahrain
- Height: 1.74 m (5 ft 8 1/2 in)
- Position: Midfielder

Senior career*
Years	Team	Apps	(Gls)
2000–2003	Al-Shabab		
2003–2004	Muharraq Club		
2005	Al Kharaitiyat		
2005–2006	Al-Siliya		
2006–2007	Qatar SC		
2007–2009	Al-Salmiya		
2009–2015	Al Muharraq Club		
2015–2016	Al-Ahli		

International career^{‡}
2000–2010	Bahrain	98	(5)

Managerial career
- 2017–: Al-Najma (assistance coach)
- * Club domestic league appearances and goals as of 25 November 2007 ‡ National team caps and goals as of 17 October 2011

Sayed Mahmood Jalal (born 5 November 1980) is a Bahraini footballer currently playing with Al Muharraq Club of Bahrain and the Bahrain national football team.

After starting at Al-Shabab, Sayed Mahmood Jalal joined Bahrain league giants Muharraq in 2003 and soon became a national team regular. He started four of Bahrain's six matches in the 2004 AFC Asian Cup before signing for Qatar's Al Khreitiat that same year. In 2005, he moved to Qatari league rivals Al Siliya before returning to his former club Muharraq in October 2006. The much travelled Jalal was on the move again in February when he joined Qatar SC.

== Goals for Senior National Team ==
#	Date	Venue	Opponent	Score	Result	Competition
1	October 12, 2003	Kuala Lumpur, Malaysia	Malaysia	2-2	Draw	Asian Cup Qualifier
2	October 20, 2003	Manama, Bahrain	Myanmar	4-0	Won	Asian Cup Qualifier
3	December 20, 2004	Doha, Qatar	Oman	2-3	Lost	17th Arabian Gulf Cup
4	June 27, 2007	Petaling Jaya, Malaysia	United Arab Emirates	2-2	Draw	Friendly
5	July 10, 2007	Jakarta, Indonesia	Indonesia	1-2	Lost	2007 AFC Asian Cup Group Stage
