= Wesam Rizik =

Qatari footballer (born 1981)

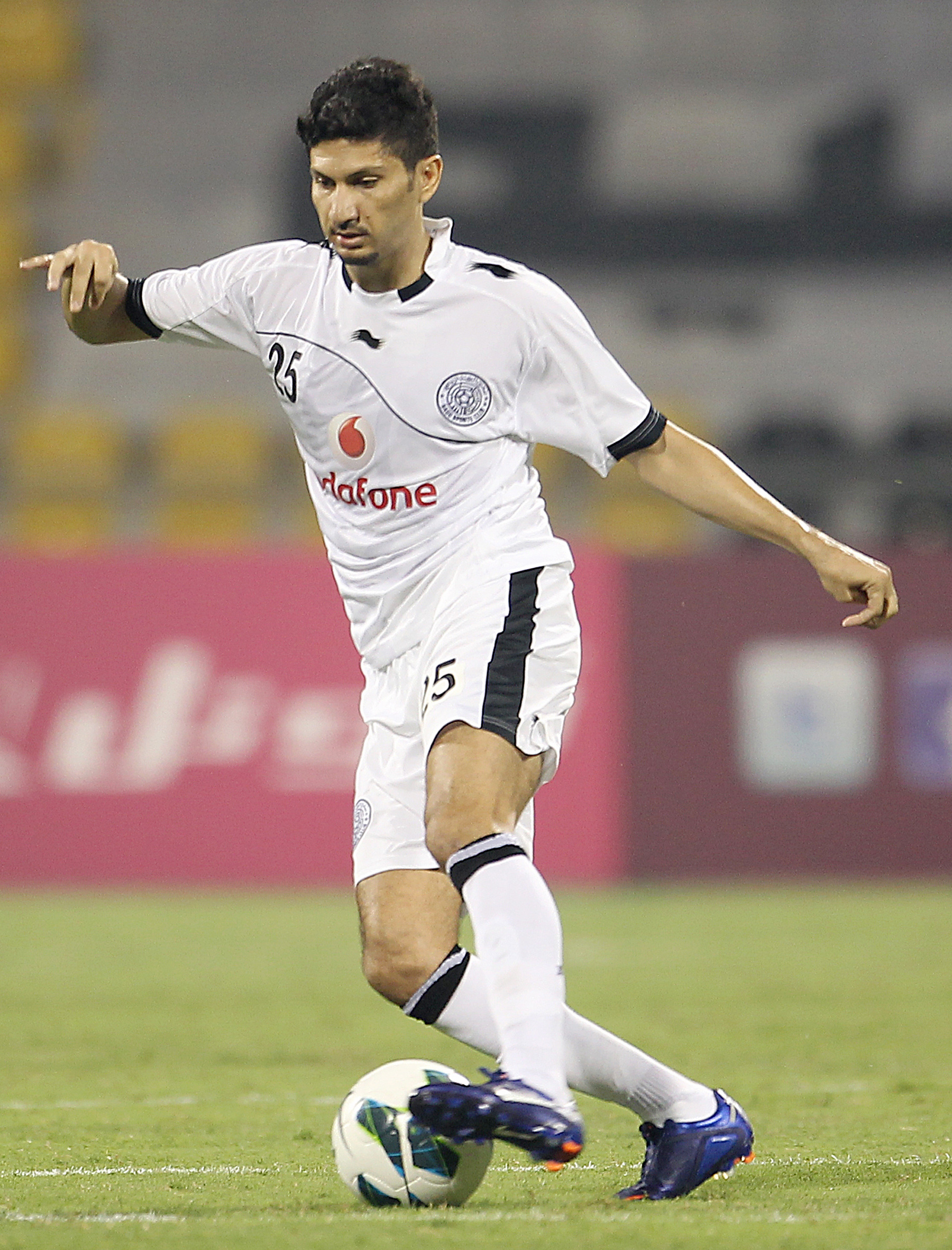
- Rizik with Al Sadd in 2012

Personal information
- Full name: Wesam Rizik Abdulmajid
- Date of birth: 5 February 1981 (age 45)
- Place of birth: Kuwait City, Kuwait
- Height: 1.83 m (6 ft 0 in)
- Position: Midfielder

Youth career
- 1997–2000: Al Ahli

Senior career*
Years	Team	Apps	(Gls)
2000–2004	Qatar SC	57	(16)
2004–2009	Al Sadd	104	(14)
2009–2010	Al Khor	19	(0)
2010–2013	Al Sadd	41	(2)
2013–2016	El Jaish	44	(3)
Total		265	(35)

International career
2001–2014	Qatar	114	(7)

Managerial career
- 2019–2020: Qatar SC
- 2021: Al Kharaitiyat
- 2021–2023: Umm Salal
- 2023: Al-Shamal
- 2023–2024: Al Sadd
- 2024-2024: Al-Quwa Al-Jawiya
- 2025–: Zakho FC
- * Club domestic league appearances and goals

Wesam Rizik Abdulmajid (Arabic: وِسَام رِزْق عَبْد الْمَجِيد; born 5 February 1981) is a football coach and a former player. Born in Kuwait, he represented Qatar internationally.

== International career ==
Rizik has appeared for the senior Qatar national football team in 114 matches.

== Personal life ==
Rizik got married in December 2011. Also in 2011, he was appointed as the first ambassador of Al Sadd's social responsibility program, "180 Degree Change", which is the first of its kind in the Gulf [sic] region.

== Career statistics ==
=== International ===
Scores and results list Qatar's goal tally first, score column indicates score after each Rizik goal.

List of international goals scored by Wesam Rizik
No.	Date	Venue	Opponent	Score	Result	Competition	Ref.
1	21 July 2004	Workers' Stadium, Beijing, China	Bahrain	1–0	1–1	2004 AFC Asian Cup	
2	8 September 2004	Anouvong Stadium, Vientiane, Laos	Laos	1–0	6–1	2006 FIFA World Cup qualification	
3	5 December 2004	Doha, Qatar	Yemen	1–0	3–0	Friendly	
4	10 December 2004	Jassim bin Hamad Stadium, Doha, Qatar	United Arab Emirates	2–2	2–2	17th Arabian Gulf Cup	
5	24 December 2004	Jassim bin Hamad Stadium, Doha, Qatar	Oman	1–0	1–1 (5–4 p)	17th Arabian Gulf Cup	
6	16 August 2006	MA Aziz Stadium, Chittagong, Bangladesh	Bangladesh	1–0	4–1	2007 AFC Asian Cup qualification	
7	10 August 2010	Stadion Grbavica, Sarajevo, Bosnia and Herzegovina	Bosnia and Herzegovina	1–1	1–1	Friendly	

== Managerial statistics ==
As of match played 24 May 2024

Managerial record by team and tenure
Team	Nat	From	To	Record							
Team	Nat	From	To	G	W	D	L	GF	GA	GD	Win %
Qatar SC	(Qatar)	24 September 2019	22 August 2020	18	4	8	6	16	18	−2	22.22
Umm Salal	(Qatar)	29 October 2021	28 January 2023	37	12	9	16	55	45	+10	32.43
Al Shamal	(Qatar)	1 February 2023	20 May 2023	15	3	2	10	15	33	−18	20.00
Al Sadd	(Qatar)	25 November 2023	24 May 2024	29	19	6	4	77	27	+50	65.52
Al-Quwa Al-Jawiya	(Iraq)	1 June 2024	5 December 2024	13	7	3	3	16	13	+3	53.85
Total				112	45	28	39	179	136	+43	40.18

== See also ==
- List of men's footballers with 100 or more international caps
