= Ahmed bin Ali Stadium (original) =

Stadium in Al Rayyan, Qatar

- ملعب أحمد بن علي (Arabic)
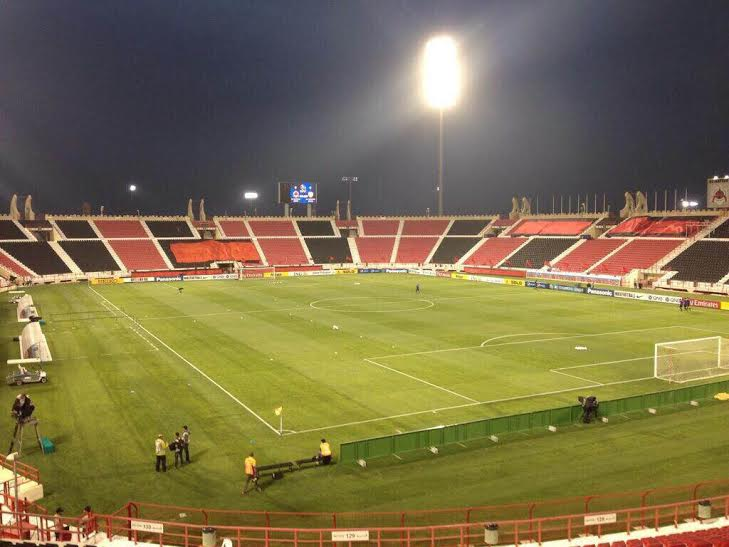
- Interior view of the stadium
- Interactive map of Ahmed bin Ali Stadium
- Location: Dukhan Road 88HR+RX; Al Rayyan, Qatar
- Coordinates: 25°19′47″N 51°20′32″E
- Capacity: 25,000
- Surface: Grass
- Public transit: Al Riffa (الرفاع)

Construction
- Opened: 2003
- Closed: 2014
- Demolished: 2015

Tenant
- Al-Rayyan SC (2003–2014)

The original Ahmed bin Ali Stadium (Arabic: ملعب أحمد بن علي, romanized: Malʿab ʾAḥmad bin ʿAliyy), popularly known as the Al-Rayyan Stadium, was an association football stadium located in the district of Rawdat Al Jahhaniya, Qatar, around 9 kilometres (6 miles) northwest from the centre of Al Rayyan. It was used mostly for football matches and it was the home to Al-Rayyan Sports Club. The stadium was named after Ahmad bin Ali Al Thani, the Emir of Qatar from 1960 to 1972. The stadium, built in 2003, had a seating capacity of 21,282 and was demolished in 2015. The stadium was located 20 km west of Doha (capital of the country).

== History ==
During the 2006 Asian Games, the stadium hosted several football matches. Outdoor venues were built for hosting baseball, hockey, softball and volleyball competitions, to be disassembled at a later date.

== Demolition ==
The stadium was demolished in 2015 to make way for the Al Rayyan Stadium. 90 percent of the rubble resulting from the demolition of the stadium was anticipated to be reused either for the new stadium or for public art projects.

The construction of the new stadium started in early 2016. This was done by the joint venture between Al-Balagh and Larsen & Toubro. The new stadium was built for the 2022 FIFA World Cup, which Qatar hosted. After the World Cup, the stadium capacity was to be reduced to 21,000 seats.

== Recent tournament results ==
=== 17th Arabian Gulf Cup ===
Date	Time	Team #1	Result	Team #2	Round	Attendance
11 December 2004	21:30	Bahrain	1–1	Yemen	Group B	N/A
11 December 2004	23:45	Kuwait	2–1	Saudi Arabia	Group B	N/A
14 December 2004	21:30	Kuwait	1–1	Bahrain	Group B	N/A
15 December 2004	00:00	Yemen	0–2	Saudi Arabia	Group B	N/A
16 December 2004	21:30	United Arab Emirates	1–1	Iraq	Group A	N/A
17 December 2004	21:30	Bahrain	3–0	Saudi Arabia	Group B	N/A
20 December 2004	21:30	Oman	3–2	Bahrain	Semi-finals	N/A

=== Football at the 2005 West Asian Games ===
Date	Time	Team #1	Result	Team #2	Round	Attendance
1 December 2005	19:00	Iraq	4–0	Palestine	Group B	N/A
3 December 2005	21:00	Saudi Arabia	2–0	Palestine	Group B	N/A
5 December 2005	21:00	Iraq	5–1	Saudi Arabia	Group B	N/A
10 December 2005	20:30	Iran	2–1	Saudi Arabia	Bronze medal match	N/A

=== Football at the 2006 Asian Games - Men's tournament ===
Date	Time	Team #1	Result	Team #2	Round	Attendance
28 November 2006	17:15	Thailand	1–0	Palestine	Group C (Round 2)	501
28 November 2006	19:45	Kuwait	3–0	Kyrgyzstan	Group C (Round 2)	202
2 December 2006	17:15	Kyrgyzstan	0–2	Thailand	Group C (Round 2)	990
2 December 2006	19:45	Kuwait	2–0	Palestine	Group C (Round 2)	296
5 December 2006	17:15	Palestine	0–3	Kyrgyzstan	Group C (Round 2)	412
5 December 2006	19:45	South Korea	1–0	Bahrain	Group B (Round 2)	412
9 December 2006	16:00	China	2–2 (a.e.t.) (7–8 p)	Iran	Quarter Final	4,724
9 December 2006	19:00	South Korea	3–0	North Korea	Quarter Final	4,728

=== 2011 AFC Asian Cup ===
Date	Time	Team #1	Result	Team #2	Round	Attendance
9 January 2011	19:15	Saudi Arabia	1–2	Syria	Group B	15,768
11 January 2011	19:15	Iraq	1–2	Iran	Group D	10,478
13 January 2011	16:15	Jordan	1–0	Saudi Arabia	Group B	17,349
15 January 2011	19:15	United Arab Emirates	0–1	Iraq	Group D	7,233
17 January 2011	16:15	Saudi Arabia	0–5	Japan	Group B	2,022
19 January 2011	19:15	Iraq	1–0	North Korea	Group D	4,111

=== Football at the 2011 Pan Arab Games ===
Date	Time	Team #1	Result	Team #2	Round	Attendance
11 December 2011	17:30	Saudi Arabia	0–0	Oman	Group B	N/A
14 December 2011	17:30	Oman	0–2	Kuwait	Group B	N/A
17 December 2011	17:30	Sudan	0–2	Palestine	Group C	N/A
17 December 2011	19:30	Saudi Arabia	0–2	Kuwait	Group B	N/A
