= Husain Ali =

Bahraini footballer

Personal information
- Full name: Husain Ali Ahmed Abdulla
- Date of birth: 31 December 1981 (age 44)
- Place of birth: Jidhafs, Bahrain
- Height: 1.78 m (5 ft 10 in)
- Position: Striker

Youth career
- 1983–1993: Jidhafs

Senior career*
Years	Team	Apps	(Gls)
1996–1998	Jidhafs Club		
1998–2004	Al-Muharraq		
2005	Al-Rayyan		
2005–2006	Al-Gharrafa		
2006–2008	Umm-Salal		
2008–2014	Al-Muharraq		
2014–2018	Al-Shabab		

International career^{‡}
1998–2013	Bahrain	117	(33)
- * Club domestic league appearances and goals ‡ National team caps and goals as of 9 September 2014

Husain Ali Ahmed Abdulla (Arabic: حُسَيْن عَلِيّ أَحْمَد عَبْد الله; born 31 December 1981) is a Bahraini retired football player known as Husain Pelé. He last played for Al-Shabab of Bahrain and was a former player for the Bahrain national team. He was top goal scorer in the Bahrain Premier League in 1998 and 2003 with 16 and 18 goals respectively.

== International career ==
Husain Ali made his international debut as a 16-year-old on 3 October 1998 against Sudan national team and has since earned 101 appearances, thus entering FIFA's century club. He was Bahrain's all-time top scorer with 33 goals, before being surpassed by Ismail Abdul-Latif.

=== International goals ===
#	Date	Venue	Opponent	Score	Result	Competition
1.	21 June 2001	Kuala Lumpur, Malaysia	Malaysia	2–2	4–2	2001 Merdeka Tournament
2.	21 June 2001	Kuala Lumpur, Malaysia	Malaysia	3–2	4–2	2001 Merdeka Tournament
3.	21 June 2001	Kuala Lumpur, Malaysia	Malaysia	4–2	4–2	2001 Merdeka Tournament
4.	16 October 2001	Bangkok, Thailand	Thailand	1–1	1–1	2002 FIFA World Cup qualifier
5.	21 October 2001	Manama, Bahrain	Iran	2–0	3–1	2002 FIFA World Cup qualifier
6.	27 January 2002	Riyadh, Saudi Arabia	United Arab Emirates	1–0	2–1	15th Arabian Gulf Cup
7.	28 December 2002	Kuwait	Jordan	1–1	2–1	2002 Arab Nations Cup
8.	28 December 2002	Kuwait	Jordan	2–1	2–1	2002 Arab Nations Cup
9.	19 September 2003	Manama, Bahrain	Lebanon	4–1	4–3	Friendly
10.	10 October 2003	Kuala Lumpur, Malaysia	Myanmar	2–1	3–1	2004 AFC Asian Cup qualifier
11.	20 October 2003	Manama, Bahrain	Myanmar	2–0	4–0	2004 AFC Asian Cup qualifier
12.	22 October 2003	Manama, Bahrain	Malaysia	1–0	3–1	2004 AFC Asian Cup qualifier
13.	22 October 2003	Manama, Bahrain	Malaysia	3–1	3–1	2004 AFC Asian Cup qualifier
14.	26 May 2004	Beirut, Lebanon	Lebanon	2–0	2–2	Friendly
15.	31 May 2004	Dubai, UAE	United Arab Emirates	3–1	3–2	Friendly
16.	9 June 2004	Arad, Bahrain	Kyrgyzstan	4–0	5–0	2006 FIFA World Cup qualifier
17.	5 July 2004	Bangkok, Thailand	Thailand	2–0	2–0	Friendly
18.	17 July 2004	Beijing, China	China	2–2	2–2	2004 AFC Asian Cup
19.	25 July 2004	Jinan, China	Indonesia	1–0	3–1	2004 AFC Asian Cup
20.	2 September 2004	Arad, Bahrain	Palestine	1–0	1–0	Friendly
21.	8 September 2004	Bishkek, Kyrgyzstan	Kyrgyzstan	1–0	2–1	2006 FIFA World Cup qualifier
22.	1 December 2004	Riffa, Bahrain	Finland	1–0	1–2	2004 Bahrain P.M. Cup
23.	3 December 2004	Riffa, Bahrain	Latvia	2–2	2–2	Friendly
24.	14 December 2004	Doha, Qatar	Kuwait	1–1	1–1	17th Arabian Gulf Cup
25.	2 February 2005	Doha, Qatar	Lebanon	2–0	2–1	Friendly
26.	25 March 2005	Pyongyang, North Korea	North Korea	1–0	2–1	2006 FIFA World Cup qualifier
27.	25 March 2005	Pyongyang, North Korea	North Korea	2–0	2–1	2006 FIFA World Cup qualifier
28.	3 August 2005	Manama, Bahrain	Turkmenistan	3–0	5–0	Friendly
29.	7 August 2005	Manama, Bahrain	Iraq	2–2	2–2	Friendly
30.	17 August 2005	Manama, Bahrain	North Korea	2–2	2–3	2006 FIFA World Cup qualifier
31.	22 February 2006	Manama, Bahrain	Australia	1–0	1–3	2007 AFC Asian Cup qualifier
32.	26 August 2009	Manama, Bahrain	Kenya	1–0	2–1	Friendly
33.	26 August 2009	Manama, Bahrain	Kenya	2–1	2–1	Friendly

== See also ==
- List of men's footballers with 100 or more international caps
