= Shamsul Maidin =

Singaporean association football referee

- Full name: Shamsul Maidin
- Born: April 16, 1966 (age 60); Singapore

Domestic
Years	League	Role
1996–2007	Football Association of Singapore	Referee

International
Years	League	Role
1996–2007	FIFA-listed	Referee

Shamsul Maidin (born 16 April 1966) is a Singaporean association football referee. He first became a referee in 1996 and retired in 2007.

Shamsul has been the AFC Director of Referees since 2016 where he has contributed to the development of Asian Refereeing for over two decades as a match official, instructor and manager. Having represented Asia at the 2006 FIFA World Cup and the 2005 FIFA Confederations Cup, Shamsul was twice selected as the AFC Official of the Year in the mentioned consecutive years. He has also won the S.League Referee of the Year award four times, in 1997, 1998, 1999 and 2001.

Specialised in Human Resources studies, Shamsul is a former Football Association of Singapore (FAS) referee retired in 2007. Recognised for his experience as referee instructor and referee assessor at FIFA and AFC level, Shamsul was appointed as part of the instructors' team of the 2012 Summer Olympic Games in London and the 2010 FIFA World Cup in South Africa. Other highlights of his career include the 1996, 2000 and the 2004 AFC Asian Cup editions, as well as the 2003 and 2001 FIFA World Youth Championships. The Singaporean also became the only non-African match official at the 2006 African Cup of Nations and guided the United Arab Emirates Football Association (UAEFA) referees as their Technical Director from 2013 to 2015.

Shamsul is currently leading the Referees Department of the Asian Football Confederation (AFC). He is the first Singaporean to be chosen as AFC's director of referees. Since January 2017, Shamsul is a member of the FIFA Referees Committee. Additionally, Shamsul is a member of the IFAB Technical Advisory Panel since 2016.

== Refereeing career ==
=== AFC Asian Cup ===
Shamsul officiated in the 1996 AFC Asian Cup officiating the match between South Korea and Indonesia where South Korea won 4–2. In the 2000 AFC Asian Cup, he refereed the match between Japan and Uzbekistan where Japan massively won 8–1. He was also selected in the semi-finals match between China and Japan with Japan emerging as winners as they advanced to the final beating China 3–2. In the 2004 AFC Asian Cups, he took charge of the match between South Korea and Kuwait where the Koreans won the match 4–0. Shamsul was then selected to refereed in the quarter-finals between China and Iraq and in the semi-finals between Bahrain and Japan.

=== African Cup of Nations ===
Shamsul was also selected to referee at the 2006 African Cup of Nations in Egypt becoming the only non-African referee in the tournament. He refereed in two group stages match between Libya and Ivory Coast and the match between Tunisia and Guinea.

=== FIFA World Youth Championship ===
as well as the 2001 and 2003 FIFA World Youth Championship.

=== FIFA Confederations Cup ===
Shamsul had also officiated in the Argentina v Australia match in Nuremberg, in which Argentina won 4–2, during the 2005 FIFA Confederations Cup,

=== FIFA World Cup ===
==== 2006 FIFA World Cup ====
In 2006, Shamsul was selected by FIFA as one of the official referees for the 2006 FIFA World Cup in Germany. It was only the second time a Singaporean had taken part in a FIFA World Cup after George Suppiah in 1974, also held in Germany (then West Germany).

Shamsul took charge of the group stage game between Trinidad and Tobago and Sweden, brandishing the first red card of the tournament to Trinidad and Tobago's player, Avery John. He also officiated the group stage game between Mexico and Angola, sending off Angola's André Macanga, becoming the first referee of the tournament who sends off two players. Shamsul's appointment for the Mexico-Angola match saw him becoming the first Singaporean to referee more than one match at the World Cup.

Shamsul also officiated the final Group A game between Costa Rica and Poland, becoming the first referee of the competition to perform in three matches. Finally, he was appointed as fourth official for the Round of 16 match between Germany and Sweden.

==== 2010 FIFA World Cup ====
In the 2010 FIFA World Cup in South Africa, Shamsul was appointed as a technical instructor by FIFA.

== Notable matches ==
=== FIFA Tournament ===
2006 FIFA World Cup – Germany
Date	Match	Venue	Round
10 June 2006	Trinidad and Tobago – Sweden	Dortmund	Group stage
16 June 2006	Mexico – Angola	Hanover	Group stage
20 June 2006	Costa Rica – Poland	Hanover	Group stage

2005 FIFA Confederations Cup – Germany
Date	Match	Venue	Round
18 June 2005	Australia – Argentina	Nuremberg	Group stage

2001 FIFA World Youth Championship – Argentina
Date	Match	Venue	Round
20 June 2001	Jamaica – Finland	Buenos Aires	Group stage
28 June 2001	Angola – Netherlands	Rosario	Round of 16

2003 FIFA World Youth Championship – United Arab Emirates
Date	Match	Venue	Round
29 November 2003	Paraguay – United States	Abu Dhabi	Group stage
2 December 2003	England – Egypt	Dubai	Group stage

=== AFC Tournament ===
1996 AFC Asian Cup – United Arab Emirates
Date	Match	Venue	Round
7 December 1996	South Korea – Indonesia	Abu Dhabi	Group stage

2000 AFC Asian Cup – Lebanon
Date	Match	Venue	Round
17 October 2000	Japan – Uzbekistan	Sidon	Group stage
19 October 2000	China – Kuwait	Tripoli	Group stage
26 October 2000	China – Japan	Beirut	Semi-finals

2004 AFC Asian Cup – China
Date	Match	Venue	Round
27 July 2004	South Korea – Kuwait	Jinan	Group stage
30 July 2004	China – Iraq	Beijing	Quarter-finals
3 August 2004	Bahrain – Japan	Jinan	Semi-finals

=== CAF Tournament ===
2006 Africa Cup of Nations – Egypt
Date	Match	Venue	Round
24 January 2006	Libya – Ivory Coast	Cairo	Group stage
30 January 2006	Tunisia – Guinea	Alexandria	Group stage
