= Chengdu Longquanyi Football Stadium =

Sports stadium in Chendu, Sichuan, China

- Interactive map of Chengdu Longquanyi Football Stadium
- Location: Chengdu, Sichuan, China
- Coordinates: 30.6158°N 104.3078°E
- Capacity: 27,000
- Surface: Grass

Construction
- Groundbreaking: 2003
- Opened: 2004

Tenants
- Chengdu Tiancheng F.C.（2019） Sichuan Jiuniu F.C.（2018－2019）

Chengdu Longquanyi Football Stadium (Chinese: 成都龙泉驿足球场) is a multi-purpose stadium located in the eastern outskirts of Chengdu, Sichuan, China. Situated in the mostly suburban Longquanyi District, where it derived its name, the stadium is currently used mostly for football matches. The stadium began construction in 2003, and initially could hold 27,000 people; it was completed on June 26, 2004, in time for the 2004 AFC Asian Cup. It was the third stadium purpose-built for football (soccer) in China.

Chengdu Tiancheng F.C. sometimes used this stadium for matches when its main venue was occupied for other uses. As of 2013, the stadium has basically fallen into disuse, occasionally holding concerts or football matches that required a neutral pitch. The 2005 Super Girl Chengdu Concert was held here.

The Boy Band South Korean Super Junior performed at the stadium during the last date on his Super Show Tour with an audience of 31,000 people on March 7, 2009.
