= Saleh Farhan =

Bahraini footballer

Personal information
- Full name: Saleh Farhan Al-Saleh
- Date of birth: 1 January 1981 (age 45)
- Place of birth: Bahrain
- Height: 1.78 m (5 ft 10 in)
- Position: Midfielder

Senior career*
| Years | Team | Apps | (Gls) |
| 2003–2004 | Al-Riffa | | |
| 2005 | Qatar SC | | |
| 2005–2007 | Al-Riffa | | |
| 2007–2008 | Al-Hala | | |
| 2008–2014 | Al-Riffa | | |

International career
| 2003–2006 | Bahrain | 30 | (5) |
- * Club domestic league appearances and goals

Saleh Ahmed Farhan (born 1 January 1981) is a Bahraini footballer currently playing for Al-Riffa of Bahrain and the Bahrain national football team. He is of Syrian descent.

== Career statistics ==
=== International ===
Appearances and goals by national team and year
| National team | Year | Apps | Goals |
|---|---|---|---|
| Bahrain | 2003 | 9 | 2 |
| Bahrain | 2004 | 12 | 2 |
| Bahrain | 2005 | 7 | 1 |
| Bahrain | 2006 | 2 | 0 |
| Total | | 30 | 5 |
