= Fareed Al-Marzouqi =

Emirati football referee (born 1965)

Fareed Ali
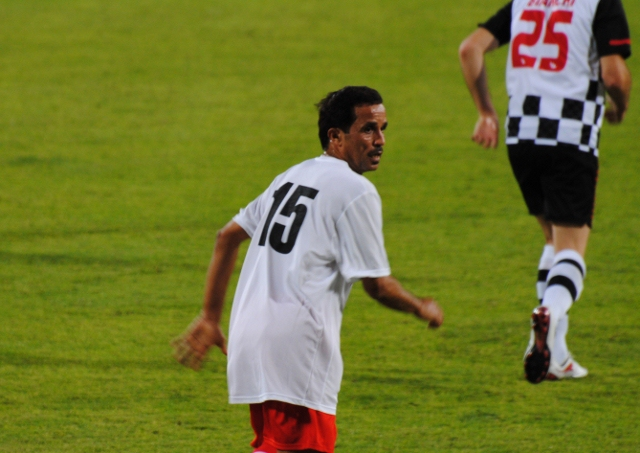
- Full name: Fareed Ali Al-Marzouqi
- Born: 22 December 1965 (age 60)

International
Years	League	Role
2008–	FIFA listed	Referee

Fareed Ali Al-Marzouqi (Arabic: فريد علي; born 22 December 1965) is an Emirati football referee. He became a FIFA referee in 2008. He was judged at the 15th Arabian Gulf Cup in 2002, and managed the Qatar national football team and the Kuwait national football team on January 26, 2002.
