= Mohamed Hubail =

Bahraini footballer

Personal information
- Full name: Mohamed Ahmed Mohamed Hubail
- Date of birth: 23 June 1981 (age 45)
- Place of birth: Bahrain
- Height: 1.68 m (5 ft 6 in)
- Position: Midfielder

Senior career*
| Years | Team | Apps | (Gls) |
| 2001–2004 | Al-Ahli Manama | | |
| 2004–2005 | Al-Gharrafa | | |
| 2005–2006 | Qatar SC | | |
| 2006–2007 | Al-Ahli Manama | | |
| 2007–2009 | Al-Arabi Kuwait | | |
| 2009 | Al-Ahli Manama | | |
| 2010 | Al-Qadisiya | 7 | (0) |
| 2010–2011 | Al-Ahli Manama | | |
| 2011 | Muscat | | |
| 2012–2013 | Fanja | 5 | |
| 2013–2014 | Sitra Club | 8 | |

International career^{‡}
| 2004–2011 | Bahrain | 70 | (5) |
- * Club domestic league appearances and goals as of 25 March 2011 ‡ National team caps and goals as of 17 October 2011

Mohamed Hubail (born 23 June 1981) is a Bahraini footballer who was sentenced to a two-year term of imprisonment by a special security court in Bahrain after taking part in pro-democratic reform protests in Bahrain in 2011.

== Career ==
Hubail is a member of the Bahrain national football team with 61 international appearances, his first in 2004. He is a midfield player who has scored 5 goals at international level. At club level, Hubail currently plays for Al-Ahli Manama in Bahrain. He began his career with Al-Ahli and has also played for Al-Qadisiyah al-Khobar in Saudi Arabia, Al-Arabi Mansouriah in Kuwait and Qatar SC ad-Dōḥa and Al-Gharrafa ad-Dōḥa in Qatar.

== Personal life ==
Mohamed's younger brother, A'ala Hubail, is also a footballer and a member of the Bahraini national team.

== 2011 detention, secret trial and imprisonment ==
External videos
- Documentary film about Bahraini athletes 2011 detention on YouTube

On 5 April 2011 Mohamed Hubail and his brother A'ala were arrested by the Bahreini authorities and held in custody on an indefinite basis. The brothers had attended demonstrations during the 2011 Bahraini protests. Al-Ahli announced that the brothers had been dismissed from the club squad. The Al Wefaq party, the main opposition party in the Bahrain, announced that he had been convicted and sentenced on June 23 to two years in prison. According to Al Wefaq, the trial was conducted in secret by Bahrain's special security court established under the martial law regime imposed in March 2011.

On 24 June 2011 FIFA, the world football governing body, announced that it had contacted the Bahraini football authorities to provide information about cases involving players detained during political protests. Following allegations of government interference in the sport after Mohammed Hubail's prison sentence and A'ala Hubail's trial and the suspension of over 150 athletes, coaches and referees for taking part in anti-government protests, Bahrain could face a ban from world soccer. Suspension by FIFA could prevent Bahrain participating in Asian Olympic Games qualifying round matches (due in September 2011). According to the Office of the United Nations High Commissioner for Human Rights in Geneva, the Bahraini trials appeared to bear the marks of political persecution and there were serious concerns that the due process rights of the defendants were not respected.

On 29 June 2011 the Bahrain News Agency reported that the Bahrain Defence Force military public prosecutor had announced that "defendants involved at medical and sport crimes" had been released, but trials would continue in accordance with Bahraini legal procedures.

== National team career statistics ==
=== Goals for Senior National Team ===
| # | Date | Venue | Opponent | Score | Result | Competition |
|---|---|---|---|---|---|---|
| | July 17, 2004 | Beijing, China | China | 2-2 | Draw | 2004 AFC Asian Cup |
| | July 21, 2004 | Beijing, China | Qatar | 1-1 | Draw | 2004 AFC Asian Cup |
| | September 8, 2004 | Bishkek, Kyrgyzstan | Kyrgyzstan | 2-1 | Won | 2006 FIFA World Cup qualification |
| | November 17, 2004 | Manama, Bahrain | Tajikistan | 4-0 | Won | 2006 FIFA World Cup qualification |
| | November 17, 2004 | Manama, Bahrain | Tajikistan | 4-0 | Won | 2006 FIFA World Cup qualification |
