= Shandong Provincial Stadium =

Multi-purpose stadium in Shandong, China

Shandong Provincial Sports Centre Stadium
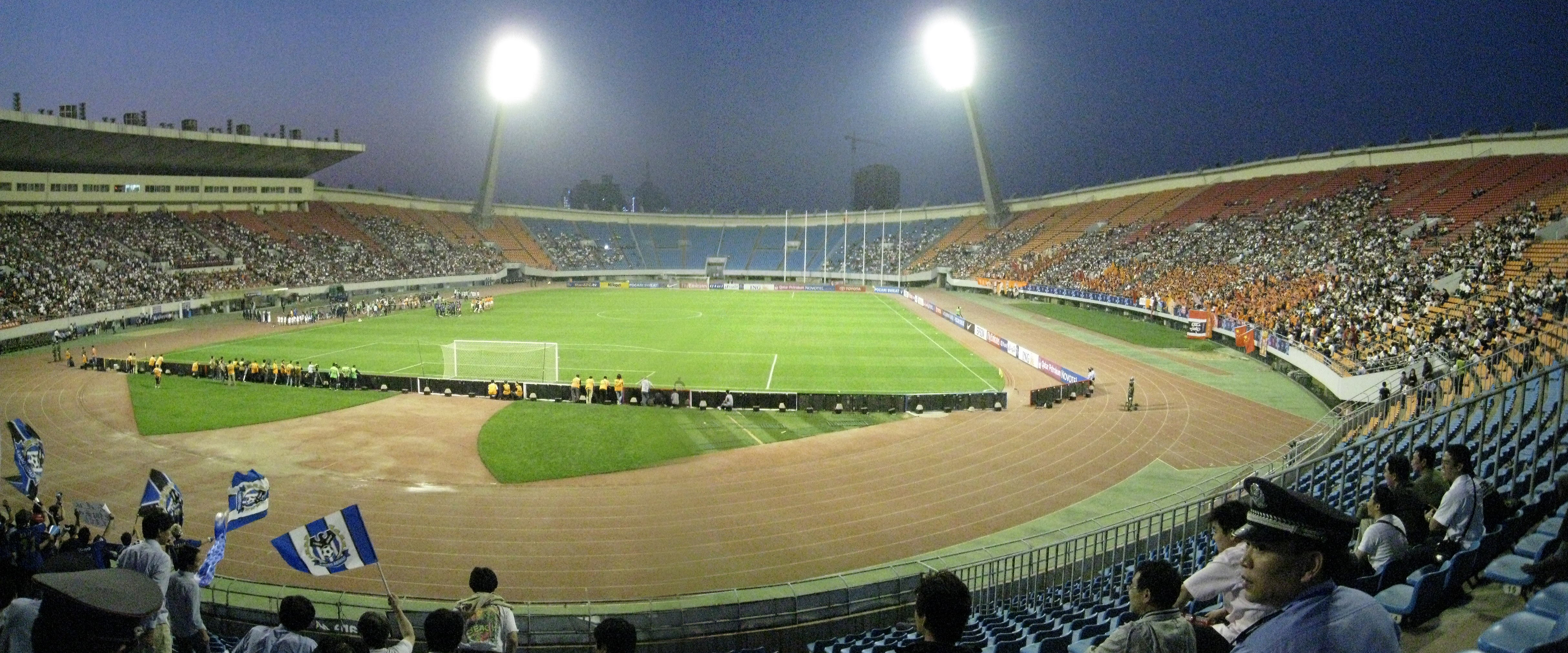
- Interactive map of Shandong Provincial Sports Centre Stadium
- Location: Jinan, Shandong, People's Republic of China
- Coordinates: 36°38′48″N 117°0′21″E
- Capacity: 43,700
- Surface: Grass
- Field size: 105 x 68 m

Construction
- Opened: 1988

Tenant
- Jinan Xingzhou (2023–)

The Shandong Provincial Sports Centre Stadium (Chinese: 山东省体育场; pinyin: Shāndōng Shěng Tǐyù Cháng) is a multi-purpose stadium located in the Shandong Provincial Sports Centre (Chinese: 山东省体育中心; pinyin: Shāndōng Shěng Tǐyù Zhōngxīn) of Jinan, Shandong, People's Republic of China. It is currently used mostly for football matches. The stadium holds 43,700 and was built in 1988.

== International Matches ==
=== Asian Cup 2004 ===
Date	Team 1	Score	Team 2	Competition	Attendance
2004-07-19	South Korea	0 - 0	Jordan	Group Stage (Group B)	26,000
2004-07-19	Kuwait	3 - 1	United Arab Emirates	Group Stage (Group B)	31,250
2004-07-23	Jordan	2 - 0	Kuwait	Group Stage (Group B)	28,000
2004-07-23	United Arab Emirates	0 - 2	South Korea	Group Stage (Group B)	30,000
2004-07-25	Bahrain	3 - 1	Indonesia	Group Stage (Group A)	20,000
2004-07-27	South Korea	4 - 0	Kuwait	Group Stage (Group B)	15,000
2004-07-31	South Korea	3 - 4	Iran	Quarterfinals	20,000
2004-08-03	Bahrain	3 - 4	Japan	Semifinals	32,000

== See also ==
- Shandong Arena
