= A'ala Hubail =

Bahraini footballer

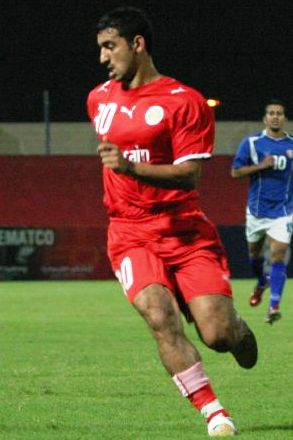
- Hubail with Bahrain in 2006

Personal information
- Full name: A'ala Ahmed Mohamed Hubail
- Date of birth: 25 June 1982 (age 44)
- Place of birth: Sitra, Bahrain
- Height: 1.70 m (5 ft 7 in)
- Position: Striker

Youth career
- 1998–2002: Al-Ahli

Senior career*
Years	Team	Apps	(Gls)
2002–2005	Al-Ahli	26	(7)
2005–2007	Al-Gharrafa	63	(33)
2007–2008	Kuwait	15	(6)
2008–2009	Umm-Salal	24	(9)
2009–2011	Al-Ahli	3	(1)
2011–2012	Al-Taliya	20	(7)
2012–2013	Nejmeh	18	(5)
2013–2014	Sitra		(1)
2014–2017	Manama Club		(4)
2017	Al Hala		
Total		169+	(73)

International career
2003–2009	Bahrain	74	(26)
- * Club domestic league appearances and goals

A'ala Ahmed Mohamed Hubail (Arabic: علاء أحمد محمد حبيل; born 25 June 1982) is a Bahraini former professional footballer who played as a striker. With the Bahrain national team.

== 2011 detention ==
External videos
- Documentary film about A'ala Hubail and other athletes 2011 detention on YouTube

On 5 April 2011 A'ala Hubail and his brother Mohamed (also a member of the national football team) were arrested by the Bahraini authorities and held in custody on an indefinite basis. A'ala Hubail, a trained paramedic, had attended demonstrations during the 2011 Bahraini protests and had reportedly helped provide medical assistance. The day before his arrest A'ala Hubail had appeared on a chatshow programme on Bahrain state television in which he had been aggressively questioned and criticised. Al-Ahli announced that the brothers had been dismissed from the club squad.

It was reported that he had received treatment in a military hospital after being tortured and that he may have suffered an injury to one of his feet.

On 23 June it was announced that Mohamed Hubail had been secretly tried and sentenced to two years in prison by the Bahraini special security court established under the martial law regime imposed in March 2011. A'ala Hubail's trial was reported to have begun in secret on 24 June 2011.

On 24 June FIFA, the world football governing body, announced that it had asked the Bahraini football authorities to provide information about cases of players detained during political protests. Following allegations of government interference in the sport after Mohammed Hubail's prison sentence and A'ala Hubail's trial and the suspension of over 150 athletes, coaches and referees for taking part in anti-government protests, Bahrain could face a ban from world soccer. Suspension by FIFA could prevent Bahrain participating in Asian Olympic Games qualifying round matches (due in September 2011). According to the Office of the United Nations High Commissioner for Human Rights in Geneva, the Bahraini trials appeared to bear the marks of political persecution and there were serious concerns that the due process rights of the defendants were not respected.

On 29 June 2011 the Bahrain News Agency reported that the Bahrain Defence Force military public prosecutor had announced that "defendants involved at medical and sport crimes" had been released, but trials would continue in accordance with Bahraini legal procedures.

== Career statistics ==
=== International ===
#	Date	Venue	Opponent	Score	Result	Competition
	12 December 2003	Manama, Bahrain	Iraq	2-2	Draw	Friendly
	18 February 2004	Al Muharraq, Bahrain	Syria	2-1	Won	2006 FIFA World Cup qualification
	18 February 2004	Al Muharraq, Bahrain	Syria	2-1	Won	2006 FIFA World Cup qualification
	9 June 2004	Al Muharraq, Bahrain	Kyrgyzstan	5-0	Won	2006 FIFA World Cup qualification
	9 June 2004	Al Muharraq, Bahrain	Kyrgyzstan	5-0	Won	2006 FIFA World Cup qualification
	9 June 2004	Al Muharraq, Bahrain	Kyrgyzstan	5-0	Won	2006 FIFA World Cup qualification
	25 July 2004	Jinan, China	Indonesia	3-1	Won	2004 AFC Asian Cup
	30 July 2004	Chengdu, China	Uzbekistan	2-2	Draw	2004 AFC Asian Cup
	30 July 2004	Chengdu, China	Uzbekistan	2-2	Draw	2004 AFC Asian Cup
	3 August 2004	Jinan, China	Japan	3-4	Lost	2004 AFC Asian Cup
	3 August 2004	Jinan, China	Japan	3-4	Lost	2004 AFC Asian Cup
	23 December 2004	Doha, Qatar	Kuwait	3-1	Won	17th Arabian Gulf Cup
	8 November 2006	Muscat, Oman	Oman	1-1	Draw	Friendly
	24 January 2007	Abu Dhabi, UAE	Qatar	2-1	Won	18th Arabian Gulf Cup
	24 January 2007	Abu Dhabi, UAE	Qatar	2-1	Won	18th Arabian Gulf Cup
	30 June 2007	Hanoi, Vietnam	Vietnam	3-5	Lost	Friendly
	21 October 2007	Manama, Bahrain	Malaysia	4-1	Won	2010 FIFA World Cup qualification
	6 February 2008	Muscat, Oman	Oman	1-0	Won	2010 FIFA World Cup qualification
	26 March 2008	Manama, Bahrain	Japan	1-0	Won	2010 FIFA World Cup Qualification
