= 2007 AFC Asian Cup final =

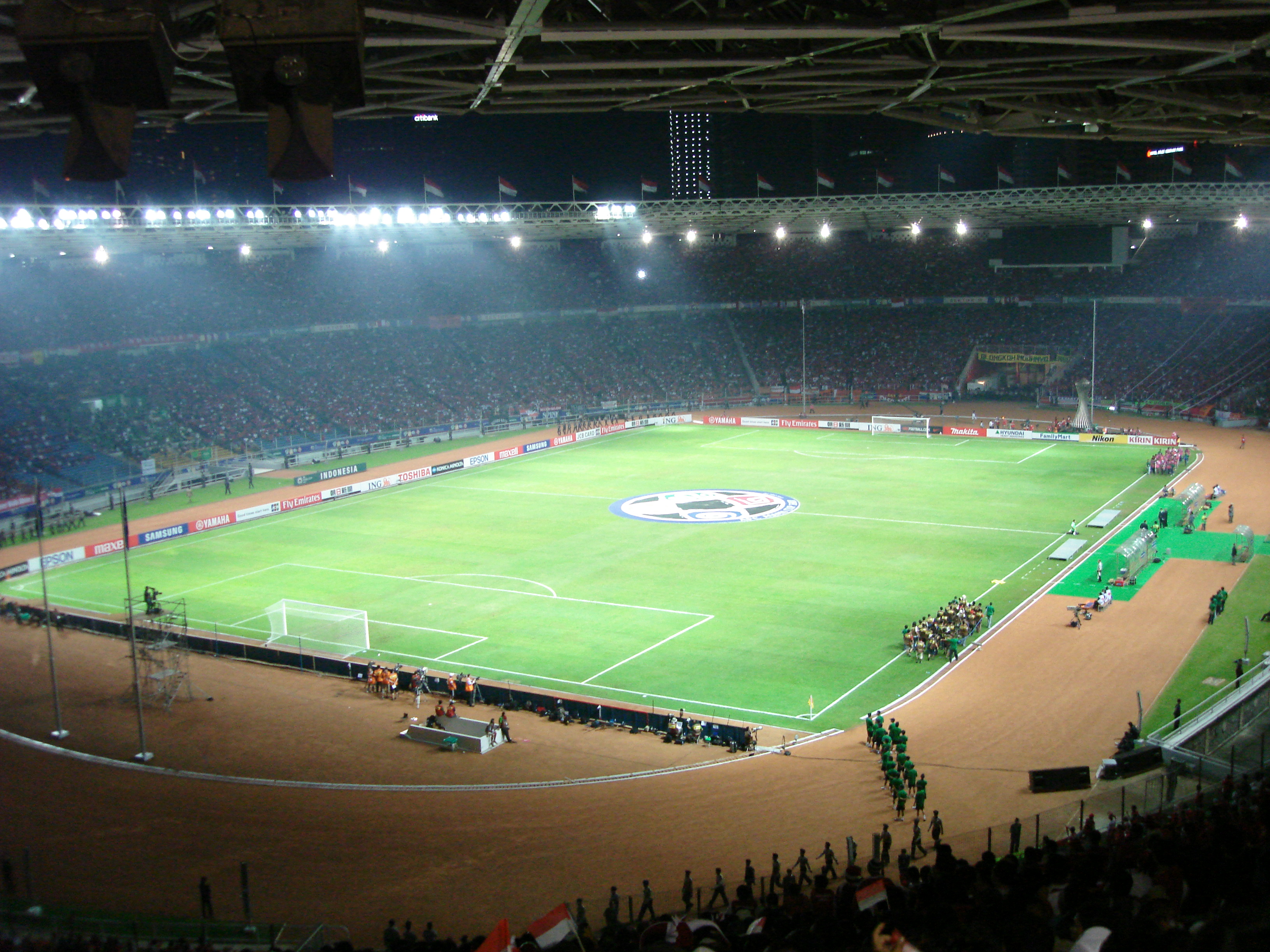
- Gelora Bung Karno Stadium hosted the final
- Event: 2007 AFC Asian Cup
Iraq	Saudi Arabia
(Iraq)	(Saudi Arabia)
1	0
- Date: 29 July 2007
- Venue: Gelora Bung Karno Stadium, Jakarta
- Man of the Match: Nashat Akram (Iraq)
- Referee: Mark Shield (Australia)
- Attendance: 60,000
- Weather: Clear; 30 °C (86 °F); 45% humidity

The 2007 AFC Asian Cup final was a football match that took place on 29 July 2007 at the Gelora Bung Karno Stadium in Jakarta, Indonesia, to determine the 2007 AFC Asian Cup champion. Iraq defeated Saudi Arabia 1–0 with a Younis Mahmoud header from Hawar Mulla Mohammed's corner in the 73rd minute sealing the victory.

This was Iraq's first appearance in the final of an Asian Cup, while Saudi Arabia had appeared in five of the previous six Asian Cup finals, winning three of them (1984, 1988 and 1996). This final was only the second all-Arab final in the tournament's history, after 1996.

Iraq had reached the final against expectations, with the team being forced to train outside of their war-torn country and suffering from transport problems and a lack of facilities. After eliminating South Korea in the semi-finals, Iraq almost pulled out of the final when two bomb attacks targeted celebrating fans and killed at least 50 people, but they decided to play on after a grieving mother said she would not bury her deceased son unless the team won the title.

The result saw thousands of Iraqis spilling onto the streets to celebrate the victory, and the win helped to unite the people of the nation. Iraq's achievement is seen as one of international football's greatest underdog stories and one of the sport's greatest fairytale victories. The win saw Iraq qualify for the 2009 FIFA Confederations Cup in South Africa. The tournament's closing ceremony was held immediately prior to kickoff.

== Background ==
The final was played between Iraq and Saudi Arabia. Iraq, coached by Brazilian Jorvan Vieira, qualified for the final after topping their group where they earned an emphatic 3–1 win against tournament favourites Australia. A 2–0 quarter-final win over co-hosts Vietnam followed before they defeated South Korea in a penalty shootout in the semi-final. Saudi Arabia, also led by a Brazilian coach (Hélio dos Anjos), topped Group D before 2–1 and 3–2 wins over Uzbekistan and Japan respectively in the quarter-final and semi-final stages saw them into the final. For Iraq, victory would bring its first ever Asian Cup title, whereas Saudi Arabia were playing for their fourth title.

After their semi-final victory, two bomb attacks deliberately targeted celebrating Iraqi fans in Baghdad and killed at least 50 people. The Iraq team held a meeting to discuss whether they should pull out of the final to avoid more potential bloodshed, but they decided to play on after a grieving mother appeared on television and said she would not bury her deceased son unless the team returned home as champions.

Before the game, the record between the two sides was 12 wins for Iraq, 7 wins for Saudi Arabia and 9 draws. Iraq's most recent victories had come in the form of 5–1 and 2–0 victories at the 2005 West Asian Games and a 2–1 win at the 2004 AFC Asian Cup, meanwhile Saudi Arabia defeated Iraq 1–0 in the 1996 AFC Asian Cup and had also won the most recent match between the teams with a controversial 1–0 win in the 18th Arabian Gulf Cup earlier in 2007.

=== Returning players ===
Among the players in the 2007 AFC Asian Cup squads, the following played in the 2004 meeting which Iraq won 2–1:

Previous appearance of players from the teams
2004	Iraq: Ahmad Ali Jaber, Bassim Abbas, Haidar Abdul-Amir, Hawar Mulla Mohammed, Mahdi Karim, Nashat Akram (goalscorer), Qusay Munir, Haidar Abdul-Razzaq and Younis Mahmoud (substitute, goalscorer); Saudi Arabia: Redha Tukar, Saud Kariri and Yasser Al-Qahtani

== Route to the final ==
Iraq
Round
Saudi Arabia
Opponent
Result
Group stage
Opponent
Result
Thailand
1–1
Match 1
South Korea
1–1
Australia
3–1
Match 2
Indonesia
2–1
Oman
0–0
Match 3
Bahrain
4–0
Group A winner

Team	Pld	W	D	L	GF	GA	GD	Pts
Iraq	3	1	2	0	4	2	+2	5
Australia	3	1	1	1	6	4	+2	4
Thailand	3	1	1	1	3	5	−2	4
Oman	3	0	2	1	1	3	−2	2

Final standings
Group D winner

Team	Pld	W	D	L	GF	GA	GD	Pts
Saudi Arabia	3	2	1	0	7	2	+5	7
South Korea	3	1	1	1	3	3	0	4
Indonesia	3	1	0	2	3	4	−1	3
Bahrain	3	1	0	2	3	7	−4	3

Opponent
Result
Knockout stage
Opponent
Result
Vietnam
2–0
Quarter-finals
Uzbekistan
2–1
South Korea
0–0 (aet) (4–3 pen.)
Semi-finals
Japan
3–2

== Match ball ==
The match ball for the 2007 AFC Asian Cup Final, announced on 15 May 2007, was Nike's Mercurial Veloci. The ball features four blue streaks with gold coloured trim with each host city's name inscribed, as well as the logo of the AFC Asian Cup.

== Match officials ==
Mark Shield, from Australia, was named as the referee of the final, together with Turkmen Begench Allaberdiyev and Maldivian Mohamed Saeed as the assistant referees, and Kuwaiti Saad Kamil Al-Fadhli as fourth official. Earlier in the 2007 Asian Cup, Shield took charge of the South Korea–Saudi Arabia and Indonesia–South Korea matches in the group stage. He had previously taken charge of the second leg of the 2006 AFC Champions League Final as well as matches in the 2002 FIFA World Cup, the 2004 AFC Asian Cup and the 2006 FIFA World Cup.

== Match ==
=== Summary ===
Both teams named unchanged starting line-ups from their semi-finals. Iraq dominated the first half of the match, and had chances to score through Qusay Munir and Younis Mahmoud before Karrar Jassim's shot was saved after a mazing run through the Saudi defence. Saudi Arabia's first significant chance was a long-range shot from Taisir Al-Jassim in the second half which was saved by Noor Sabri. The Saudis survived a scare when Younis Mahmoud and Nashat Akram both had close-range efforts saved in quick succession by Yasser Al Mosailem. Saudi Arabia struggled to deal with Nashat Akram's creativity in midfield as he made a number of chances for Iraq. The deadlock was broken on 73 minutes when Hawar Mulla Mohammed's corner sailed over Al Mosailem and was met with a header from Younis Mahmoud. After taking the lead, Iraq continued to attack and almost doubled their advantage when Mahmoud was played through on goal by Akram, but the striker's effort was saved by Al Mosailem. Iraq were left holding their breath in injury time when Saudi Arabia striker Malek Mouath's header bounced just over the crossbar, but the final whistle blew moments later to signify that the Lions of Mesopotamia had won the Asian Cup for the first time.

After the match, Nashat Akram was named the Most Valuable Player of the match, with Younis Mahmoud receiving the award for Most Valuable Player of the tournament and sharing the top scorer award with Yasser Al-Qahtani and Naohiro Takahara. The Iraqi team, a mixture of Sunni, Shia and Kurdish players, received international acclaim as they helped unite the people of a fractured, war-torn nation in celebration. Iraq's manager Jorvan Vieira said he was proud of how the players won the cup in spite of their limited preparation but also announced that he was stepping down as Iraq manager after the victory.

=== Details ===
29 July 2007
19:35

Iraq	1–0	Saudi Arabia
Mahmoud 73'	Report

Gelora Bung Karno Stadium, Jakarta
Attendance: 60,000
Referee: Mark Shield (Australia)

Iraq	Saudi Arabia

GK	22	Noor Sabri
RB	14	Haidar Abdul-Amir
CB	2	Jassim Ghulam
CB	15	Ali Rehema	(yellow card) 75'
LB	3	Bassim Abbas		(substituted off) 89'
DM	24	Qusay Munir	(yellow card) 9'
RM	18	Mahdi Karim		(substituted off) 90'
CM	5	Nashat Akram
CM	13	Karrar Jassim	(yellow card) 24'	(substituted off) 83'
LM	11	Hawar Mulla Mohammed
CF	10	Younis Mahmoud (c)	(yellow card) 38'
Substitutions:
FW	16	Ahmad Mnajed		(substituted on) 83'
FW	7	Ali Abbas		(substituted on) 89'
MF	8	Ahmad Abid Ali		(substituted on) 90'
Manager:
(Brazil) Jorvan Vieira

GK	1	Yasser Al-Mosailem
RB	14	Saud Kariri	(yellow card) 15'
CB	3	Osama Hawsawi
CB	19	Waleed Jahdali	(yellow card) 38'
LB	16	Khaled Aziz
DM	7	Kamel Al-Mousa
RM	15	Ahmed Al-Bahri		(substituted off) 84'
CM	17	Taisir Al-Jassim		(substituted off) 76'
LM	18	Abdulrahman Al-Qahtani		(substituted off) 46'
CF	9	Malek Mouath
CF	20	Yasser Al-Qahtani (c)
Substitutions:
MF	30	Ahmed Al-Mousa		(substituted on) 46'
MF	28	Abdoh Otaif		(substituted on) 76'
FW	11	Saad Al-Harthi		(substituted on) 84'
Manager:
(Brazil) Hélio dos Anjos

Man of the Match:
Nashat Akram (Iraq)

Assistant referees:
Begench Allaberdiyev (Turkmenistan)
Mohamed Saeed (Maldives)
Fourth official:
Saad Kamil Al-Fadhli (Kuwait)

=== Statistics ===
Overall	Iraq	Saudi Arabia
Goals scored	1	0
Total shots	14	5
Ball possession	52%	48%
Yellow cards	4	2
Red cards	0	0

== Reaction and impact ==
The Iraqi team, a mixture of Sunnis, Shias and Kurds, received worldwide acclaim for becoming continental champions from a background of bloodshed and violence and helping to unite a fractured nation.

Football commentator Simon Hill described it as "unbelievable" and one of football's greatest fairytale victories, noting that the team had been without a coach until two months before the tournament and had experienced troubles with travel and training. Waleed Tabra, media officer for the national team, said that he couldn't find the words to describe the joy brought on by the win, describing it as the "biggest win the nation has ever had" and noting that the victory allowed people who were living in hardship to celebrate "far away from politics".

Iraq midfielder Nashat Akram, who expressed after the game that there is "only one Iraqi people" and that the win was for them, described the poor conditions and preparations that the Iraqi team faced before the tournament, revealing that he had already booked tickets home in anticipation that Iraq would be eliminated in the group stage. British football journalist James Montague has since described it as the best achievement in international football history due to the difficult conditions experienced by the players and the significance of the victory for the country.

== See also ==
- Iraq–Saudi Arabia football rivalry
- Sports and politics
- 2011 FIFA Women's World Cup Final, which Japan won despite the disastrous Tōhoku earthquake and tsunami
