= 2007 AFC Asian Cup knockout stage =

Football tournament knockout stage

The knockout stage of the 2007 AFC Asian Cup started on 21 July and ended on 29 July 2007. The top two teams from each preliminary group advanced to this stage.

== Qualified teams ==
Group	Winners	Runners-up
A	Iraq	Australia
B	Japan	Vietnam
C	Iran	Uzbekistan
D	Saudi Arabia	South Korea

== Bracket ==
Quarter-finals
21 July – Bangkok
Iraq	2
Vietnam	0
22 July – Kuala Lumpur
Iran	0 (2)
South Korea (p)	0 (4)
21 July – Hanoi
Japan (p)	1 (4)
Australia	1 (3)
22 July – Jakarta
Saudi Arabia	2
Uzbekistan	1

Semi-finals
25 July – Kuala Lumpur
Iraq (p)	0 (4)
South Korea	0 (3)
25 July – Hanoi
Japan	2
Saudi Arabia	3

Final
29 July – Jakarta
Iraq	1
Saudi Arabia	0
Third place
28 July – Palembang
South Korea (p)	0 (6)
Japan	0 (5)

== Quarter-finals ==
=== Japan vs Australia ===
21 July 2007
17:20 UTC+7

Japan	1–1 (a.e.t.)	Australia
Takahara 72'	Report	Aloisi 70'
Penalties
S. Nakamura (penalty scored); Endō (penalty scored); Komano (penalty scored); Takahara (penalty missed); Nakazawa (penalty scored)	4–3	(penalty missed) Kewell; (penalty missed) Neill; (penalty scored) Cahill; (penalty scored) Carle; (penalty scored) Carney

Mỹ Đình National Stadium, Hanoi
Attendance: 25,000
Referee: Saad Kamil Al-Fadhli (Kuwait)

Japan	Australia

GK	1	Yoshikatsu Kawaguchi (c)
CB	6	Yuki Abe	(yellow card) 95'
CB	22	Yuji Nakazawa
CB	13	Keita Suzuki
RM	21	Akira Kaji		(substituted off) 88'
CM	14	Kengo Nakamura		(substituted off) 115'
CM	7	Yasuhito Endō
LM	3	Yūichi Komano
AM	10	Shunsuke Nakamura
CF	19	Naohiro Takahara
CF	12	Seiichiro Maki		(substituted off) 102'
Substitutions:
MF	2	Yasuyuki Konno		(substituted on) 88'
FW	11	Hisato Satō		(substituted on) 102'
FW	20	Kisho Yano		(substituted on) 115'
Manager:
(Bosnia and Herzegovina) Ivica Osim

GK	1	Mark Schwarzer
CB	2	Lucas Neill
CB	22	Mark Milligan
CB	6	Michael Beauchamp
RM	7	Brett Emerton
CM	23	Mark Bresciano		(substituted off) 71'
CM	13	Vince Grella	(red card) 75'
CM	5	Jason Culina
LM	20	David Carney	(yellow card) 81'
SS	15	John Aloisi	(yellow card) 33'	(substituted off) 82'
CF	9	Mark Viduka (c)		(substituted off) 61'
Substitutions:
FW	10	Harry Kewell	(yellow card) 65'	(substituted on) 61'
MF	4	Tim Cahill		(substituted on) 71'
MF	19	Nick Carle		(substituted on) 82'
Manager:
Graham Arnold

Man of the Match
Naohiro Takahara (Japan)

Association referees:
Abdullah Salim Al-Amouri (Oman)
Kadom Mohammad (Iraq)
Fourth official:
Abdulrahman Abdou (Qatar)

=== Iraq vs Vietnam ===
21 July 2007
20:20 UTC+7

Iraq	2–0	Vietnam
Mahmoud 2', 65'	Report

Rajamangala Stadium, Bangkok
Attendance: 9,720
Referee: Yuichi Nishimura (Japan)

Iraq	Vietnam

GK	22	Noor Sabri
RB	14	Haidar Abdul-Amir	(substituted off) 84'
CB	2	Jassim Ghulam
CB	15	Ali Rehema
LB	3	Bassim Abbas
DM	19	Haitham Kadhim	(substituted off) 32'
RM	18	Mahdi Karim
CM	5	Nashat Akram
CM	13	Karrar Jassim	(substituted off) 66'
LM	11	Hawar Mulla Mohammed
CF	10	Younis Mahmoud (c)
Substitutions:
MF	8	Ahmad Abid Ali	(substituted on) 32'
FW	9	Nasser Shakroun	(substituted on) 66'
MF	4	Khaldoun Ibrahim	(substituted on) 84'
Manager:
(Brazil) Jorvan Vieira

GK	22	Dương Hồng Sơn
RB	16	Huỳnh Quang Thanh
CB	3	Nguyễn Huy Hoàng		(substituted off) 83'
CB	7	Vũ Như Thành
LB	29	Châu Phong Hòa
CM	12	Nguyễn Minh Phương (c)
CM	11	Phùng Công Minh	(yellow card) 27'	(substituted off) 46'
CM	14	Lê Tấn Tài
AM	17	Nguyễn Vũ Phong
CF	21	Nguyễn Anh Đức		(substituted off) 70'
CF	9	Lê Công Vinh
Substitutions:
MF	15	Nguyễn Minh Chuyên		(substituted on) 46'
FW	18	Phan Thanh Bình		(substituted on) 70'
DF	6	Phạm Hùng Dũng		(substituted on) 83'
Manager:
(Austria) Alfred Riedl

Man of the Match
Younis Mahmoud (Iraq)

Association referees:
Toru Sagara (Japan)
Awni Hassouneh (Jordan)
Fourth official:
Eddy Maillet (Seychelles)

=== Iran vs South Korea ===
22 July 2007
18:20 UTC+8

Iran	0–0 (a.e.t.)	South Korea
	Report
Penalties
Zandi (penalty scored); Mahdavikia (penalty missed); Enayati (penalty scored); Khatibi (penalty missed)	2–4	(penalty scored) Lee Chun-Soo; (penalty scored) Kim Sang-Sik; (penalty missed) Kim Do-Heon; (penalty scored) Cho Jae-Jin; (penalty scored) Kim Jung-Woo

Bukit Jalil Stadium, Kuala Lumpur
Attendance: 8,629
Referee: Ali Al-Badwawi (United Arab Emirates)

Iran	South Korea

GK	1	Hassan Roudbarian		(substituted off) 120'
RB	12	Jalal Hosseini
CB	5	Rahman Rezaei
CB	6	Javad Nekounam
LB	20	Mohammad Nosrati
CM	2	Mehdi Mahdavikia (c)
CM	4	Andranik Teymourian
CM	11	Mehrzad Madanchi	(yellow card) 27'	(substituted off) 62'
AM	8	Ali Karimi
CF	9	Vahid Hashemian		(substituted off) 87'
CF	10	Rasoul Khatibi
Substitutions:
MF	7	Ferydoon Zandi		(substituted on) 62'
FW	16	Reza Enayati		(substituted on) 87'
GK	22	Vahid Talebloo		(substituted on) 120'
Manager:
Amir Ghalenoei

GK	1	Lee Woon-Jae (c)
RB	16	Oh Beom-Seok	(yellow card) 67'
CB	3	Kim Jin-Kyu
CB	22	Kang Min-Soo
LB	15	Kim Chi-Woo
DM	14	Kim Sang-Sik
DM	20	Son Dae-Ho		(substituted off) 106'
CM	17	Kim Jung-Woo
RF	10	Lee Chun-Soo
CF	12	Lee Dong-Gook		(substituted off) 46'
LF	19	Yeom Ki-Hun		(substituted off) 78'
Substitutions:
FW	9	Cho Jae-Jin		(substituted on) 46'
FW	7	Choi Sung-Kuk		(substituted on) 78'
MF	8	Kim Do-Heon		(substituted on) 106'
Manager:
(Netherlands) Pim Verbeek

Man of the Match
Ferydoon Zandi (Iran)

Association referees:
Mohamed Saeed (Maldives)
Begench Allaberdiyev (Turkmenistan)
Fourth official:
Mark Shield (Australia)

=== Saudi Arabia vs Uzbekistan ===
22 July 2007
20:20 UTC+8

Saudi Arabia	2–1	Uzbekistan
Y. Al-Qahtani 3'; A. Al-Mousa 75'	Report	Solomin 82'

Gelora Bung Karno Stadium, Jakarta
Attendance: 12,000
Referee: Kwon Jong-Chul (South Korea)

Saudi Arabia	Uzbekistan

GK	1	Yasser Al-Mosailem
RB	14	Saud Kariri	(yellow card) 60'	(substituted off) 89'
CB	3	Osama Hawsawi
CB	19	Waleed Jahdali	(yellow card) 62'
LB	16	Khaled Aziz
DM	7	Kamel Al-Mousa
RM	15	Ahmed Al-Bahri
CM	17	Taisir Al-Jassim
LM	18	Abdulrahman Al-Qahtani	(yellow card) 38'	(substituted off) 63'
CF	9	Malek Mouath
CF	20	Yasser Al-Qahtani (c)	(yellow card) 44'	(substituted off) 90'
Substitutions:
MF	30	Ahmed Al-Mousa		(substituted on) 63'
MF	6	Omar Al-Ghamdi		(substituted on) 89'
FW	11	Saad Al-Harthi		(substituted on) 90'
Manager:
(Brazil) Hélio dos Anjos

GK	12	Ignatiy Nesterov
RB	17	Aleksey Nikolayev
CB	4	Aziz Ibrahimov
CB	2	Hayrulla Karimov	(yellow card) 53'
LB	28	Anvar Gafurov	(yellow card) 35'	(substituted off) 46'
CM	7	Aziz Haydarov		(substituted off) 78'
CM	18	Timur Kapadze		(substituted off) 57'
RW	19	Islom Inomov
AM	8	Server Djeparov
LW	23	Vitaliy Denisov	(yellow card) 52'
CF	16	Maksim Shatskikh (c)	(yellow card) 53'
Substitutes:
FW	15	Aleksandr Geynrikh		(substituted on) 46'
MF	26	Victor Karpenko		(substituted on) 57'
FW	9	Pavel Solomin		(substituted on) 78'
Manager:
Rauf Inileev

Man of the Match
Ahmed Al-Mousa (Saudi Arabia)

Association referees:
Jeong Hae-Sang (South Korea)
Tang Yew Mun (Singapore)
Fourth official:
Lee Gi-Young (South Korea)

== Semi-finals ==
=== Iraq vs South Korea ===
25 July 2007
18:20 UTC+8

Iraq	0–0 (a.e.t.)	South Korea
	Report
Penalties
Hawar (penalty scored); Munir (penalty scored); Abdul-Amir (penalty scored); Mnajed (penalty scored)	4–3	(penalty scored) Lee Chun-Soo; (penalty scored) Lee Dong-Gook; (penalty scored) Cho Jae-Jin; (penalty missed) Yeom Ki-Hun; (penalty missed) Kim Jung-Woo

Bukit Jalil Stadium, Kuala Lumpur
Attendance: 12,500
Referee: Saad Kamil Al-Fadhli (Kuwait)

Iraq	South Korea

GK	22	Noor Sabri
RB	14	Haidar Abdul-Amir
CB	2	Jassim Ghulam
CB	15	Ali Rehema
LB	3	Bassim Abbas	(yellow card) 59'
DM	24	Qusay Munir
RM	18	Mahdi Karim
CM	5	Nashat Akram	(yellow card) 109'
CM	13	Karrar Jassim		(substituted off) 108'
LM	11	Hawar Mulla Mohammed
CF	10	Younis Mahmoud (c)
Substitutions:
FW	16	Ahmad Mnajed		(substituted on) 108'
Manager:
(Brazil) Jorvan Vieira

GK	1	Lee Woon-Jae (c)
RB	16	Oh Beom-Seok
CB	3	Kim Jin-Kyu
CB	22	Kang Min-Soo
LB	15	Kim Chi-Woo
RM	10	Lee Chun-Soo
CM	14	Kim Sang-Sik	(substituted off) 58'
CM	20	Son Dae-Ho	(substituted off) 106'
LM	19	Yeom Ki-Hun
SS	9	Cho Jae-Jin
CF	7	Choi Sung-Kuk	(substituted off) 87'
Substitutions:
MF	17	Kim Jung-Woo	(substituted on) 58'
FW	12	Lee Dong-Gook	(substituted on) 87'
MF	27	Oh Jang-Eun	(substituted on) 106'
Manager:
(Netherlands) Pim Verbeek

Man of the Match
Lee Chun-Soo (South Korea)

Association referees:
Saleh Al-Marzouqi (United Arab Emirates)
Poon Ming Fai (Hong Kong)
Fourth official:
Ali Al-Badwawi (United Arab Emirates)

=== Japan vs Saudi Arabia ===
25 July 2007
20:20 UTC+7

Japan	2–3	Saudi Arabia
Nakazawa 37'; Abe 53'	Report	Y. Al-Qahtani 35'; Mouath 47', 57'

Mỹ Đình National Stadium, Hanoi
Attendance: 10,000
Referee: Matthew Breeze (Australia)

Japan	Saudi Arabia

GK	1	Yoshikatsu Kawaguchi (c)
CB	6	Yuki Abe
CB	22	Yuji Nakazawa
CB	13	Keita Suzuki
RM	21	Akira Kaji
CM	14	Kengo Nakamura		(substituted off) 87'
CM	7	Yasuhito Endō		(substituted off) 75'
LM	3	Yūichi Komano
AM	10	Shunsuke Nakamura
CF	19	Naohiro Takahara	(yellow card) 69'
CF	12	Seiichiro Maki		(substituted off) 68'
Substitutions:
FW	11	Hisato Satō		(substituted on) 68'
MF	8	Naotake Hanyu		(substituted on) 75'
FW	20	Kisho Yano		(substituted on) 87'
Manager:
(Bosnia and Herzegovina) Ivica Osim

GK	1	Yasser Al-Mosailem
RB	14	Saud Kariri	(substituted off) 86'
CB	3	Osama Hawsawi
CB	19	Waleed Jahdali	(substituted off) 77'
LB	16	Khaled Aziz
DM	7	Kamel Al-Mousa
RM	15	Ahmed Al-Bahri
CM	17	Taisir Al-Jassim
LM	18	Abdulrahman Al-Qahtani	(substituted off) 60'
CF	9	Malek Mouath
CF	20	Yasser Al-Qahtani (c)
Substitutions:
MF	30	Ahmed Al-Mousa	(substituted on) 60'
DF	25	Redha Tukar	(substituted on) 77'
MF	6	Omar Al-Ghamdi	(substituted on) 86'
Manager:
(Brazil) Hélio dos Anjos

Man of the Match
Malek Mouath (Saudi Arabia)

Association referees:
Mohamed Saeed (Maldives)
Begench Allaberdiyev (Turkmenistan)
Fourth official:
Abdulrahman Abdou (Qatar)

== Third place play-off ==
28 July 2007
19:35 UTC+7

South Korea	0–0 (a.e.t.)	Japan
	Report
Penalties
Cho Jae-Jin (penalty scored); Oh Beom-Seok (penalty scored); Lee Chun-Soo (penalty scored); Lee Ho (penalty scored); Kim Jin-Kyu (penalty scored); Kim Chi-Woo (penalty scored)	6–5	(penalty scored) S. Nakamura; (penalty scored) Endō; (penalty scored) Abe; (penalty scored) Komano; (penalty scored) Nakazawa; (penalty missed) Hanyu

Gelora Sriwijaya Stadium, Palembang
Attendance: 10,000
Referee: Ali Al-Badwawi (United Arab Emirates)

South Korea	Japan

GK	1	Lee Woon-Jae (c)
RB	16	Oh Beom-Seok
CB	3	Kim Jin-Kyu	(yellow card) 36'
CB	22	Kang Min-Soo	(yellow card) 9' (yellow-red card) 56'
LB	15	Kim Chi-Woo
CM	17	Kim Jung-Woo
CM	8	Kim Do-Heon		(substituted off) 65'
CM	27	Oh Jang-Eun		(substituted off) 86'
RF	10	Lee Chun-Soo
CF	9	Cho Jae-Jin	(yellow card) 87'
LF	19	Yeom Ki-Hun		(substituted off) 39'
Substitutions:
FW	11	Lee Keun-Ho		(substituted on) 39'
DF	13	Kim Chi-Gon		(substituted on) 65'
MF	6	Lee Ho		(substituted on) 86'
Manager:
(Netherlands) Pim Verbeek

GK	1	Yoshikatsu Kawaguchi (c)
CB	6	Yuki Abe
CB	22	Yuji Nakazawa
CB	13	Keita Suzuki
RM	21	Akira Kaji	(yellow card) 106'
CM	14	Kengo Nakamura		(substituted off) 72'
CM	7	Yasuhito Endō
LM	9	Satoru Yamagishi		(substituted off) 78'
RF	3	Yūichi Komano
CF	19	Naohiro Takahara
LF	10	Shunsuke Nakamura
Substitutions:
MF	8	Naotake Hanyu		(substituted on) 72'
FW	11	Hisato Satō		(substituted on) 78'
Manager:
(Bosnia and Herzegovina) Ivica Osim

Man of the Match
Cho Jae-Jin (South Korea)

Assistant referees:
Saleh Al Marzouqi (United Arab Emirates)
Abdullah Al Amouri (Oman)
Fourth official:
Abdulrahman Abdou (Qatar)

== Final ==
29 July 2007
19:35

Iraq	1–0	Saudi Arabia
Mahmoud 73'	Report

Gelora Bung Karno Stadium, Jakarta
Attendance: 60,000
Referee: Mark Shield (Australia)

Iraq	Saudi Arabia

GK	22	Noor Sabri
RB	14	Haidar Abdul-Amir
CB	2	Jassim Ghulam
CB	15	Ali Rehema	(yellow card) 75'
LB	3	Bassim Abbas		(substituted off) 89'
DM	24	Qusay Munir	(yellow card) 9'
RM	18	Mahdi Karim		(substituted off) 90'
CM	5	Nashat Akram
CM	13	Karrar Jassim	(yellow card) 24'	(substituted off) 83'
LM	11	Hawar Mulla Mohammed
CF	10	Younis Mahmoud (c)	(yellow card) 38'
Substitutions:
FW	16	Ahmad Mnajed		(substituted on) 83'
FW	7	Ali Abbas		(substituted on) 89'
MF	8	Ahmad Abid Ali		(substituted on) 90'
Manager:
(Brazil) Jorvan Vieira

GK	1	Yasser Al-Mosailem
RB	14	Saud Kariri	(yellow card) 15'
CB	3	Osama Hawsawi
CB	19	Waleed Jahdali	(yellow card) 38'
LB	16	Khaled Aziz
DM	7	Kamel Al-Mousa
RM	15	Ahmed Al-Bahri		(substituted off) 84'
CM	17	Taisir Al-Jassim		(substituted off) 76'
LM	18	Abdulrahman Al-Qahtani		(substituted off) 46'
CF	9	Malek Mouath
CF	20	Yasser Al-Qahtani (c)
Substitutions:
MF	30	Ahmed Al-Mousa		(substituted on) 46'
MF	28	Abdoh Otaif		(substituted on) 76'
FW	11	Saad Al-Harthi		(substituted on) 84'
Manager:
(Brazil) Hélio dos Anjos

Man of the Match:
Nashat Akram (Iraq)

Assistant referees:
Begench Allaberdiyev (Turkmenistan)
Mohamed Saeed (Maldives)
Fourth official:
Saad Kamil Al-Fadhli (Kuwait)
