= 2007 AFC Asian Cup Group D =

Football tournament group stage

Group D was one of four groups of nations competing at the 2007 AFC Asian Cup. The group's first round of matches began on 10 July and its last matches were played on 18 July. All six group matches were played at venues in Jakarta, Indonesia. The group consisted of hosts Indonesia, Bahrain, South Korea and Saudi Arabia.

== Overall ==
Pos	Team	Pld	W	D	L	GF	GA	GD	Pts	Qualification
1	Saudi Arabia	3	2	1	0	7	2	+5	7	Advance to knockout stage
2	South Korea	3	1	1	1	3	3	0	4	Advance to knockout stage
3	Indonesia (H)	3	1	0	2	3	4	−1	3	
4	Bahrain	3	1	0	2	3	7	−4	3	

Source: Asian Cup 2007
Rules for classification: Tiebreakers
(H) Hosts

All times are UTC+7.

== Indonesia vs Bahrain ==
10 July 2007
17:20

Indonesia	2–1	Bahrain
Budi 14'; Bambang 64'	Report	Jalal 27'

Gelora Bung Karno Stadium, Jakarta
Attendance: 60,000
Referee: Yuichi Nishimura (Japan)

Indonesia	Bahrain

GK	1	Yandri Pitoy
CB	6	Charis Yulianto
CB	4	Ricardo Salampessy	(yellow card) 52'
CB	5	Maman Abdurahman
RM	2	Muhammad Ridwan	(yellow card) 37'
CM	11	Ponaryo Astaman (c)		(substituted off) 34'
LM	9	Mahyadi Panggabean		(substituted off) 31'
RW	8	Elie Aiboy	(yellow card) 40'	(substituted off) 85'
AM	15	Firman Utina
LW	13	Budi Sudarsono
CF	20	Bambang Pamungkas
Substitutions:
MF	7	Eka Ramdani	(yellow card) 71'	(substituted on) 31'
MF	16	Syamsul Chaerudin		(substituted on) 34'
DF	22	Supardi Nasir		(substituted on) 85'
Manager:
(Bulgaria) Ivan Kolev

GK	21	Abdul Rahman Ahmed
RB	15	Abdullah Omar		(substituted off) 66'
CB	3	Abdulla Al-Marzooqi	(yellow card) 61'
CB	17	Hussain Ali Baba
LB	25	Faouzi Mubarak Aaish
CM	8	Rashid Al-Dosari (c)		(substituted off) 83'
CM	27	Mahmood Abdulrahman
CM	7	Sayed Mahmood Jalal
RF	29	Mohamed Hubail		(substituted off) 80'
CF	26	Jaycee John Okwunwanne
LF	30	A'ala Hubail
Substitutions:
MF	13	Talal Yousef	(yellow card) 90+3'	(substituted on) 66'
FW	9	Husain Ali		(substituted on) 80'
MF	12	Abdulla Baba Fatadi		(substituted on) 83'
Manager:
(Czech Republic) Milan Máčala

Man of the Match:
Firman Utina (Indonesia)

Assistant referees:
Toru Sagara (Japan)
Liu Tiejun (China)
Fourth official:
Sun Baojie (China)

== South Korea vs Saudi Arabia ==
11 July 2007
19:35

South Korea	1–1	Saudi Arabia
Choi Sung-kuk 65'	Report	Y. Al-Qahtani 77' (pen.)

Gelora Bung Karno Stadium, Jakarta
Attendance: 15,000
Referee: Mark Shield (Australia)

South Korea	Saudi Arabia

GK	1	Lee Woon-jae (c)
RB	16	Oh Beom-seok
CB	3	Kim Jin-kyu
CB	22	Kang Min-soo
LB	15	Kim Chi-woo
DM	14	Kim Sang-sik	(yellow card) 37'
DM	20	Son Dae-ho
CM	17	Kim Jung-woo
RF	9	Cho Jae-jin	(yellow card) 28'	(substituted off) 81'
CF	7	Choi Sung-kuk		(substituted off) 66'
LF	19	Yeom Ki-hun
Substitutions:
FW	10	Lee Chun-soo		(substituted on) 66'
FW	12	Lee Dong-gook		(substituted on) 81'
Manager:
(Netherlands) Pim Verbeek

GK	1	Yasser Al-Mosailem
CB	3	Osama Hawsawi
CB	7	Kamel Al-Mousa
CB	19	Waleed Jahdali
RM	15	Ahmed Al-Bahri
CM	14	Saud Kariri	(yellow card) 89'
CM	16	Khaled Aziz	(yellow card) 63'
LM	18	Abdulrahman Al-Qahtani		(substituted off) 56'
AM	30	Ahmed Al-Mousa	(yellow card) 25'
CF	9	Malek Mouath
CF	20	Yasser Al-Qahtani (c)		(substituted off) 80'
Substitutions:
MF	28	Abdoh Otaif		(substituted on) 56'
FW	11	Saad Al-Harthi		(substituted on) 80'
Manager:
(Brazil) Hélio dos Anjos

Man of the Match:
Yasser Al-Qahtani (Saudi Arabia)

Assistant referees:
Benjamin Silva (India)
Saleh Al-Marzouqi (United Arab Emirates)
Fourth official:
Ali Al-Badwawi (United Arab Emirates)

== Saudi Arabia vs Indonesia ==
14 July 2007
19:35

Saudi Arabia	2–1	Indonesia
Y. Al-Qahtani 12'; Al-Harthi 89'	Report	Elie 17'

Gelora Bung Karno Stadium, Jakarta
Attendance: 87,000
Referee: Ali Al-Badwawi (United Arab Emirates)

Saudi Arabia	Indonesia

GK	1	Yasser Al-Mosailem
CB	3	Osama Hawsawi
CB	7	Kamel Al-Mousa
CB	19	Waleed Jahdali
RM	15	Ahmed Al-Bahri
CM	14	Saud Kariri		(substituted off) 66'
CM	16	Khaled Aziz	(yellow card) 53'
LM	18	Abdulrahman Al-Qahtani
AM	30	Ahmed Al-Mousa		(substituted off) 56'
CF	9	Malek Mouath
CF	20	Yasser Al-Qahtani (c)		(substituted off) 89'
Substitutions:
MF	28	Abdoh Otaif		(substituted on) 56'
MF	17	Taisir Al-Jassim		(substituted on) 66'
FW	11	Saad Al-Harthi		(substituted on) 89'
Manager:
(Brazil) Hélio dos Anjos

GK	1	Yandri Pitoy
CB	6	Charis Yulianto
CB	4	Ricardo Salampessy
CB	5	Maman Abdurahman
RM	8	Elie Aiboy		(substituted off) 80'
CM	7	Eka Ramdani	(yellow card) 3'
CM	16	Syamsul Chaerudin	(yellow card) 65'
LM	2	Muhammad Ridwan
AM	15	Firman Utina	(yellow card) 15'	(substituted off) 84'
CF	13	Budi Sudarsono	(yellow card) 35'	(substituted off) 89'
CF	20	Bambang Pamungkas (c)
Substitutions:
DF	22	Supardi Nasir		(substituted on) 80'
FW	17	Atep Rizal	(yellow card) 87'	(substituted on) 84'
DF	14	Ismed Sofyan		(substituted on) 89'
Manager:
(Bulgaria) Ivan Kolev

Man of the Match:
Saad Al-Harthi (Saudi Arabia)

Assistant referees:
Saleh Al-Marzouqi (United Arab Emirates)
Muhammad Islam (Bangladesh)
Fourth official:
Mark Shield (Australia)

== Bahrain vs South Korea ==
15 July 2007
19:35

Bahrain	2–1	South Korea
Isa 43'; Abdullatif 85'	Report	Kim Do-Heon 4'

Gelora Bung Karno Stadium, Jakarta
Attendance: 9,000
Referee: Sun Baojie (China)

Bahrain	South Korea

GK	21	Abdul Rahman Ahmed
CB	3	Abdulla Al-Marzooqi
CB	16	Sayed Mohamed Adnan
CB	2	Mohamed Husain
RM	29	Mohamed Hubail
CM	8	Rashid Al-Dosari (c)
CM	7	Sayed Mahmood Jalal	(yellow card) 27'
LM	14	Salman Isa		(substituted off) 78'
RF	11	Ismail Abdullatif		(substituted off) 87'
CF	30	A'ala Hubail
LF	25	Faouzi Mubarak Aaish
Substitutions:
MF	27	Mahmood Abdulrahman		(substituted on) 78'
MF	10	Mohamed Salmeen		(substituted on) 87'
Manager:
(Czech Republic) Milan Máčala

GK	1	Lee Woon-Jae (c)
RB	2	Song Chong-Gug
CB	3	Kim Jin-Kyu
CB	22	Kang Min-Soo
LB	4	Kim Dong-Jin
DM	14	Kim Sang-Sik
DM	6	Lee Ho		(substituted off) 68'
CM	8	Kim Do-Heon
RF	10	Lee Chun-Soo	(yellow card) 56'
CF	12	Lee Dong-Gook		(substituted off) 66'
LF	19	Yeom Ki-Hun
Substitutions:
FW	9	Cho Jae-Jin		(substituted on) 66'
MF	17	Kim Jung-Woo		(substituted on) 68'
Manager:
(Netherlands) Pim Verbeek

Man of the Match:
Ismail Abdul-Latif (Bahrain)

Assistant referees:
Liu Tiejun (China)
Poon Ming Fai (Hong Kong)
Fourth official:
Yuichi Nishimura (Japan)

== Indonesia vs South Korea ==
18 July 2007
17:20 UTC+7

Indonesia	0–1	South Korea
	Report	Kim Jung-Woo 34'

Gelora Bung Karno Stadium, Jakarta
Attendance: 88,000
Referee: Mark Shield (Australia)

Indonesia	South Korea

GK	23	Markus Horison
RB	6	Charis Yulianto	(yellow card) 47'
CB	4	Ricardo Salampessy
CB	16	Syamsul Chaeruddin	(yellow card) 69'
LB	5	Maman Abdurahman
CM	8	Elie Aiboy	(yellow card) 6'
CM	11	Ponaryo Astaman (c)		(substituted off) 76'
CM	2	Muhammad Ridwan
AM	15	Firman Utina
CF	13	Budi Sudarsono
CF	20	Bambang Pamungkas
Substitutions:
DF	3	Erol Iba		(substituted on) 76'
Manager:
(Bulgaria) Ivan Kolev

GK	1	Lee Woon-Jae (c)
RB	16	Oh Beom-Seok
CB	3	Kim Jin-Kyu		(substituted off) 88'
CB	22	Kang Min-Soo
LB	15	Kim Chi-Woo	(yellow card) 80'
DM	14	Kim Sang-Sik
DM	20	Son Dae-Ho		(substituted off) 89'
CM	17	Kim Jung-Woo
AM	10	Lee Chun-Soo
AM	7	Choi Sung-Kuk
CF	9	Cho Jae-Jin
Substitutions:
FW	12	Lee Dong-Gook		(substituted on) 88'
MF	27	Oh Jang-Eun		(substituted on) 89'
Manager:
(Netherlands) Pim Verbeek

Man of the Match:
Kim Jung-Woo (South Korea)

Assistant referees:
Liu Tiejun (China)
Poon Ming Fai (Hong Kong)
Fourth official:
Sun Baojie (China)

== Saudi Arabia vs Bahrain ==
18 July 2007
17:20

Saudi Arabia	4–0	Bahrain
A. Al-Mousa 18'; A. Al-Qahtani 45'; Al-Jassim 68', 79'	Report

Gelora Sriwijaya Stadium, Palembang
Attendance: 500
Referee: Yuichi Nishimura (Japan)

Saudi Arabia	Bahrain

GK	1	Yasser Al-Mosailem
RB	3	Osama Hawsawi
CB	7	Kamel Al-Mousa
CB	14	Saud Kariri
LB	19	Waleed Jahdali
CM	15	Ahmed Al-Bahri
CM	17	Taisir Al-Jassim	(yellow card) 33'
CM	18	Abdulrahman Al-Qahtani		(substituted off) 56'
AM	30	Ahmed Al-Mousa		(substituted off) 71'
CF	9	Malek Mouath
CF	20	Yasser Al-Qahtani (c)		(substituted off) 77'
Substitutions
MF	28	Abdoh Otaif		(substituted on) 56'
MF	6	Omar Al-Ghamdi		(substituted on) 71'
FW	11	Saad Al-Harthi	(yellow card) 89'	(substituted on) 77'
Manager:
(Brazil) Hélio dos Anjos

GK	21	Abdul Rahman Ahmed
CB	3	Abdulla Al-Marzooqi
CB	16	Sayed Mohamed Adnan	(yellow card) 69'
CB	2	Mohamed Husain
RM	11	Ismail Abdullatif
CM	8	Rashid Al-Dosari	(yellow card) 77'
CM	7	Sayed Mahmood Jalal		(substituted off) 81'
LM	14	Salman Isa
RF	13	Talal Yousef (c)	(yellow card) 3'	(substituted off) 73'
CF	30	A'ala Hubail		(substituted off) 67'
LF	25	Faouzi Mubarak Aaish	(yellow card) 39'
Substitutions:
FW	26	Jaycee John Okwunwanne		(substituted on) 67'
MF	12	Abdulla Baba Fatadi		(substituted on) 73'
MF	18	Hussain Salman		(substituted on) 81'
Manager:
(Czech Republic) Milan Máčala

Man of the Match:
Taisir Al-Jassim (Saudi Arabia)

Assistant referees:
Toru Sagara (Japan)
Saleh Al-Marzouqi (United Arab Emirates)
Fourth official:
Ali Al-Badwawi (United Arab Emirates)
