= Jassim Ghulam Al-Hamd =

Iraqi footballer (born 1979)

Jassim Mohammed Ghulam
Personal information
- Full name: Jassim Mohammed Ghulam Al Hamd
- Date of birth: 11 March 1979 (age 47)
- Place of birth: Baghdad, Iraq
- Height: 1.83 m (6 ft 0 in)
- Position: Defender

Team information
- Current team: Al-Quwa Al-Jawiya (Assist. coach)

Senior career*
Years	Team	Apps	(Gls)
1997–2001	Al-Jaish		
2001–2002	Al-Quwa Al-Jawiya		
2002–2003	Al-Zawraa		
2003–2004	Al-Shorta		
2004–2006	Al-Quwa Al-Jawiya		
2006–2007	Al-Baqa'a		
2007	Al-Wihdat		
2007–2008	Al Rayyan	13	(1)
2008	Aboomoslem	4	(1)
2008–2009	Al-Baqa'a		
2009–2011	Al-Quwa Al-Jawiya		

International career^{‡}
2001–2009	Iraq	24	(1)

Managerial career
- 2015–2019: Al-Quwa Al-Jawiya (Team supervisor)
- 2020–: Al-Quwa Al-Jawiya (Assist. coach)
Medal record
Men's football
Representing Iraq
AFC Asian Cup
Winner	2007 Indonesia/Malaysia/ Thailand/Vietnam
- * Club domestic league appearances and goals as of 17 August 2010 (UTC) ‡ National team caps and goals as of 7 January 2009

Jassim Mohammed Ghulam Al Hamd (Arabic: جَاسِم مُحَمَّد غُلَام الْحَمَد; born March 11, 1979, in Baghdad, Iraq) is an Iraqi former professional footballer who last played for Al-Quwa Al-Jawiya in Iraq.

== Information ==
A tall defender, Ghulam was a member of the victorious squad in the 2000 AFC Youth Championship. After starting his career with Al Jaish, he joined Al Zawraa before moving to Al Quwa Al Jawiya. In 2001, Jassim was surprisingly brought into the 2002 World Cup qualifying squad by Adnan Hamad after the sacking of Milan Zivadinovic, but he was not called into the final squad until Sadiq Saadoun and Sabah Jeayer were not fit enough to travel to Kazakhstan, making his debut in the 4–2 win over Nepal.

In August 2006, he left Al Quwa Al Jawiya to join Jordan’s Al Baqaa before recently moving to Jordanian league champions Al Wihdat. In 2007 Ghulam played all 6 matches with Iraq national team to win the Asian cup for the first time in history. He played a big role in defence alongside Ali Rehema, Bassim Abbas and Haidar Abdul-Amir. In 2008 Ghulam signed with Aboomoslem.

== International goals ==
Scores and results list Iraq's goal tally first.

#	Date	Venue	Opponent	Score	Result	Competition
1.	22 October 2007	Punjab Stadium, Lahore	Pakistan	4–0	7-0	2010 FIFA World Cup qual.

== Honours ==
=== International ===
- 2002 WAFF Champions
- 2007 Asian Cup winners
