= Moataz Al-Musa =

Saudi Arabian footballer

Moataz Al-Mousa
Personal information
- Full name: Moataz Sadeeq Eisa Al-Mousa
- Date of birth: 6 August 1987 (age 39)
- Place of birth: Mecca, Saudi Arabia
- Height: 1.76 m (5 ft 9 1/2 in)
- Position: Defensive midfielder

Senior career*
Years	Team	Apps	(Gls)
2005–2015	Al-Ahli	93	(15)
2016	Najran	13	(1)
2016–2017	Al-Wehda	10	(2)
2021–2022	Al-Wadi		
2024–2025	Al-Zayton		
2025	Heraa		

International career
2008–2013	Saudi Arabia	16	(0)
- * Club domestic league appearances and goals

Moataz Al-Mousa (Arabic: معتز الموسى; (born 6 August 1987) is a retired Saudi professional footballer who plays for Al-Zayton as a midfielder. He has played in one World Cup 2010 qualifying match for Saudi Arabia.

== Career ==
Al-Musa helped Al-Ahli in obtaining Saudi Federation Cup and the Saudi Crown Prince Cup in 2007. He also achieved his team Gulf Cup for clubs in front of Al-Nasr in Saudi Arabia 2008. he also achieved the King Cup of Champions in 2011 and 2012.

=== Brothers ===
Moataz Al-Musa has two elder brothers, Kamel from Al-Ahli and Ahmed who plays Al-Wehda Club.

== Honours ==
=== Al-Ahli ===
- Crown Prince Cup: 2007
- Gulf Club Champions Cup: 2008
- Saudi Champions Cup: 2011, 2012
