= Châu Phong Hòa =

Vietnamese footballer (born 1985)

Personal information
- Full name: Châu Phong Hòa
- Date of birth: 14 August 1985 (age 41)
- Place of birth: Thanh Bình, Đồng Tháp, Vietnam
- Height: 1.72 m (5 ft 8 in)
- Position: Midfielder

Youth career
- 1995–2002: Đồng Tháp

Senior career*
Years	Team	Apps	(Gls)
2003–2008	Đồng Tháp	147	(28)
2009–2010	Becamex Bình Dương	15	(0)
2010–2012	Vissai Ninh Bình		
2013	National Police Commissary		
2014–2015	Đồng Tháp		

International career
2003–2005	Vietnam U20	3	(0)
2006–2009	Vietnam U23	5	(0)
2007–2012	Vietnam	2	(0)
- * Club domestic league appearances and goals

Châu Phong Hòa (born 14 August 1985 ) is a Vietnamese former footballer who plays for home club Vissai Ninh Bình. He was called to Vietnam national football team at 2007 AFC Asian Cup.
