= Hassan Zaher Al-Maghni =

Omani footballer (born 1985)

Hassan Zaher
Personal information
- Full name: Hassan Zaher Al-Maghni
- Date of birth: 7 January 1985 (age 41)
- Place of birth: Oman
- Height: 1.66 m (5 ft 5 in)
- Position: Striker

Team information
- Current team: Salalah

Senior career*
Years	Team	Apps	(Gls)
2004–2006	Al-Nasr	?	
2006	Al-Muharraq	?	
2006–2012	Al-Nasr	?	
2012–2018	Salalah	?	

International career
2005–2008	Oman	8	(3)
- * Club domestic league appearances and goals

Hassan Zaher Al-Maghni (Arabic: حسن زاهر المغني; born 7 January 1985), commonly known as Hassan Zaher, is an Omani footballer who plays for Al-Nasr S.C.S.C.

== Club career statistics ==
Club	Season	Division	League		Cup		Continental		Other		Total	
Club	Season	Division	Apps	Goals	Apps	Goals	Apps	Goals	Apps	Goals	Apps	Goals
Al-Nasr	2004–05	Omani League	-	4	-	6	0	0	-	0	-	10
Al-Nasr	Total		-	4	-	6	0	0	-	0	-	10
Al-Muharraq	2005–06	Bahraini Premier League	-	2	-	0	0	0	-	0	-	2
Al-Muharraq	Total		-	2	-	0	0	0	-	0	-	2
Al-Nasr	2006–07	Oman Elite League	-	1	-	0	0	0	-	0	-	1
Al-Nasr	2007–08	Oman Elite League	-	2	-	0	0	0	-	0	-	2
Al-Nasr	2008–09	Oman Elite League	-	2	-	0	0	0	-	0	-	2
Al-Nasr	2009–10	Oman Elite League	-	5	-	0	0	0	-	0	-	5
Al-Nasr	2010–11	Oman Elite League	-	1	-	0	0	0	-	0	-	1
Al-Nasr	Total		-	11	-	0	0	0	-	0	-	11
Salalah	2012–13	Oman Elite League	-	3	-	0	0	0	-	0	-	3
Salalah	Total		-	3	-	0	0	0	-	0	-	3
Career total			-	20	-	6	0	0	-	0	-	26

== International career ==
Hassan was selected for the national team for the first time in 2006. He has made appearances in the 2007 AFC Asian Cup qualification.
