= Football at the 2005 West Asian Games =

2005 West Asian Games football tournament
Doha 2005

Tournament details
- Host country: Qatar
- Dates: 1–10 December
- Teams: 9 (from 1 confederation)
- Venues: 3 (in 2 host cities)

Final positions
- Champions: Iraq (1st title)
- Runners-up: Syria
- Third place: Iran
- Fourth place: Saudi Arabia

Tournament statistics
- Matches played: 13
- Goals scored: 45 (3.46 per match)

The 2005 West Asian Games was the third West Asian Games, an international tournament for West Asian countries and territories. It was hosted by Doha, Qatar. Iraq were the champions when they beat Syria on penalties.

== Results ==
=== Group stage ===
==== Group A ====
Team	Pld	W	D	L	GF	GA	GD	Pts
Iran U23	2	2	0	0	8	1	+7	6
Qatar	2	1	0	1	3	5	−2	3
Kuwait U20	2	0	0	2	1	6	−5	0

1 December 2005

Qatar	2–1	Kuwait U20
Ibrahim 36'; Afif 43'		Fareed 74' (o.g.)

Suheim bin Hamad Stadium, Doha
Referee: Jaafar Mahfous (Bahrain)

3 December 2005

Iran U23	4–0	Kuwait U20
Borhani 58' 68'; Dashti 59' (o.g.); Oladi 72'

Suheim bin Hamad Stadium, Doha
Referee: Mamdouh Al-Mirdas (Saudi Arabia)

5 December 2005

Iran U23	4–1	Qatar
Nekounam 6'; Arzani 33'; Yavarzadeh 59'; Montazeri 76'		Ibrahim 10'

Suheim bin Hamad Stadium, Doha
Referee: Mohsen Basma (Syria)

==== Group B ====
Team	Pld	W	D	L	GF	GA	GD	Pts
Iraq	2	2	0	0	9	1	+8	6
Saudi Arabia	2	1	0	1	3	5	−2	3
Palestine	2	0	0	2	0	6	−6	0

1 December 2005

Iraq	4–0	Palestine
Farhan 4'; M. Mohammed 56'; Salah 73'; Ahmed Salah 86'

Ahmed bin Ali Stadium, Al Rayyan
Referee: Abdullah Al-Buloushi (Qatar)

3 December 2005

Saudi Arabia	2–0	Palestine
Al-Swaileh 18'; Al-Mehyani 22'

Ahmed bin Ali Stadium, Al Rayyan
Referee: Nassir Al-Ghanim (Kuwait)

5 December 2005

Iraq	5–1	Saudi Arabia
Abdul-Amir 8'; E. Mohammed 19'; Akram 30'; Mahmoud 51' 78'		Naif Al-Qadi 53'

Ahmed bin Ali Stadium, Al Rayyan
Referee: Abdullah Al-Hilali (Oman)

==== Group C ====
Team	Pld	W	D	L	GF	GA	GD	Pts
Syria	2	1	1	0	5	3	2	4
Bahrain	2	0	2	0	4	4	0	2
Oman	2	0	1	1	3	5	−2	1

3 December 2005

Oman	1–3	Syria
Zaher 35'		Rashid 41'; Muhammad 68'; Alaya 81'

Thani bin Jassim Stadium, Al Rayyan
Referee: Tan Hai (China)

4 December 2005

Bahrain	2–2	Syria
Humoud 70'; Abdul-Latif 83'		Amnah 60'; Al-Hussain 66'

Thani bin Jassim Stadium, Al Rayyan
Referee: Hazim Hussein Issa (Iraq)

6 December 2005

Bahrain	2–2	Oman
Zaher 23'; Mohammed Hussein 83'		Maki 66'; Al-Lawati 82'

Thani bin Jassim Stadium, Al Rayyan
Referee: Rosdi Shaharul, (Malaysia)

=== Knockout stage ===
==== Semi-finals ====
Iraq, Iran and Syria qualified as Groups winner, a toss between Qatar and Saudi Arabia decided on the 'best' runners-up also qualifying for the semifinals; Saudi Arabia won.

8 December 2005

Iraq	2–0	Saudi Arabia
Salah 33'; Farhan 85'

Suheim bin Hamad Stadium, Doha
Referee: Tan Hai (China)

8 December 2005

Iran U23	0–0 (a.e.t.)	Syria
Penalties
Nekounam (penalty missed); Zare (penalty scored); Daghighi (penalty missed)	1–4	(penalty scored) Al Amenah; (penalty scored) Al Hussain; (penalty scored) Chaabo; (penalty scored) Dakka

Suheim bin Hamad Stadium, Doha
Referee: Abdulrahman Abdou (Qatar)

==== Bronze medal match ====
10 December 2005

Iran U23	2–1	Saudi Arabia
Borhani 2', 4'		Al-Abdullah 8'

Suheim bin Hamad Stadium, Doha
Referee: Naser Al Enezi (Kuwait)

==== Gold medal match ====
10 December 2005

Iraq	2–2 (a.e.t.)	Syria
Farhan 45'; Mahmoud 78'		Al Amenah 19'; Al Hussain 90+1'
Penalties
Munir (penalty missed); E. Mohammed (penalty scored); Abdul-Amir (penalty scored); Mahmoud (penalty scored); Sabri (penalty scored)	4–3	(penalty missed) Aodi; (penalty scored) Dakka; (penalty scored) Alaya; (penalty scored) Chaabo; (penalty missed) Istanbuli

Suheim bin Hamad Stadium, Doha
Referee: Abdullah Al Hilali (Oman)

2005 West Asian Games football tournament

Iraq
1st title
