= Ali Rehema =

Iraqi footballer (born 1985)

Personal information
- Full name: Ali Hussein Al-Mutairi
- Date of birth: 8 August 1985 (age 41)
- Place of birth: Baghdad, Iraq
- Height: 1.80 m (5 ft 11 in)
- Positions: Centre-back; defensive midfielder

Team information
- Current team: Al-Zawraa SC (Assist. coach)

Senior career*
Years	Team	Apps	(Gls)
2002–2003	Al-Talaba	?	(?)
2003–2006	Al Quwa Al Jawiya	?	(?)
2006–2007	Arbil	11	(1)
2007–2008	Al-Ahly Tripoli	?	(2)
2008–2017	Al-Wakrah	128	(7)
2017–2018	Al-Zawraa		(0)

International career^{‡}
2005–2007	Iraq U23	19	(4)
2005–2016	Iraq	113	(2)

Managerial career
- 2021: Al-Sinaat Al-Kahrabaiya (Assist. coach)
- 2021–: Al-Zawraa SC (Assist. coach)
Medal record
Men's football
Representing Iraq
AFC Asian Cup
Winner	2007 Indonesia/Malaysia/ Thailand/Vietnam
- * Club domestic league appearances and goals as of December 9, 2017 ‡ National team caps and goals as of 16 May 2016

Ali Hussein Rehema Al-Mutairi (Arabic: عَلِيّ حُسَيْن رَحِيمَة الْمُطَيْرِيّ, born on 8 August 1985) is an Iraqi former footballer. He has represented the Iraq national football team.

== Career ==
Since playing every minute of Iraq's title-winning campaign at the 2007 AFC Asian Cup, Ali Rehema has established his status as one of the team's defensive stalwarts. He held on to his regular place during Iraq's failed 2010 FIFA World Cup South Africa qualifying bid, starting seven of the team's eight games. After playing for Al Talaba, Al Quwa Al Jawiya and Arbil FC, Rehema earned his first international move when he was signed by Libyan giants Al-Ahly in 2007. After spending a season with the Tripoli-based club, he was attracted to Qatari outfits Al Wakra, where he continues to play.

Aside from shoring up the Iraqi defence, Rehema could also play the role of a defensive midfielder in their 4-5-1 formation, protecting the back four while launching counter-attacks from deep.

Rehema announced his retirement from international football, citing his reason to allow younger players the opportunity to represent the Iraqi national team.

== International goals ==
Scores and results list Iraq's goal tally first..

#	Date	Venue	Opponent	Score	Result	Competition
1.	27 December 2008	Tahnoun Bin Mohamed Stadium, Al Ain	United Arab Emirates	2–2	2–2	International Friendly
2.	26 March 2013	Al-Shaab Stadium, Baghdad	Syria	2–1	2–1	International Friendly

== Honours ==
Club

- Iraqi Premier League: 2004–05 (with Al-Quwa Al-Jawiya), 2006–07 (with Erbil SC), 2017–18 (with Al-Zawraa)
- Iraq FA Cup: 2003 (with Talaba SC)
- Iraqi Super Cup: 2002 (with Talaba SC), 2017 (with Al-Zawraa)

Iraq

- 2005 West Asian Games Gold medallist
- 2006 Asian Games Silver medallist
- 2007 Asian Cup: winner
- 21st Arabian Gulf Cup: runner-up

Individual

- Soccer Iraq Team of the Decade: 2010–2019

== See also ==
- List of men's footballers with 100 or more international caps
