= Cho Jae-jin =

South Korean footballer (born 1981)

Personal information
- Full name: Cho Jae-jin
- Date of birth: 9 July 1981 (age 45)
- Place of birth: Paju, Gyeonggi, South Korea
- Height: 1.85 m (6 ft 1 in)
- Position: Striker

Youth career
- 1997–1999: Daeshin High School

Senior career*
Years	Team	Apps	(Gls)
2000–2004	Suwon Samsung Bluewings	16	(0)
2002–2003	→ Gwangju Sangmu Bulsajo (draft)	31	(3)
2004–2007	Shimizu S-Pulse	101	(45)
2008	Jeonbuk Hyundai Motors	26	(8)
2009–2010	Gamba Osaka	35	(10)
Total		209	(67)

International career
2000	South Korea U20	2	(2)
2003–2004	South Korea U23	23	(9)
2003–2008	South Korea	40	(10)
Medal record
Representing South Korea
Men's football
AFC Asian Cup
Bronze medal – third place	2007 Indonesia/Malaysia /Thailand/Vietnam
- * Club domestic league appearances and goals

- Cho Jae-jin
- Hangul: 조재진
- Hanja: 曺宰溱
- RR: Jo Jaejin
- MR: Cho Chaejin

Cho Jae-jin (Korean: 조재진; born 9 July 1981) is a former South Korean football player.

== Playing career ==
Cho emerged as a national star when he played for South Korean under-23 team in the 2004 Summer Olympics. He scored two goals in a 3–3 draw with Mali, helping his team advance to the quarter-finals.

Cho showed impressive performances including 45 goals in 101 J1 League appearances while playing for Shimizu S-Pulse from 2004 to 2007. He was also selected for South Korean national team for the 2006 FIFA World Cup, and played three World Cup matches as a powerful target man. David Pleat, an expert of The Guardian at the time, selected him as one of six talents outside the Premier League after the World Cup.

After his successful stint at Shimizu, Cho tried to join a Premier League club, and received offers from Newcastle United, Fulham, Portsmouth and West Ham United. However, he signed for K League club Jeonbuk Hyundai Motors after failing to negotiate with them.

Cho has congenital hip dysplasia, and started to suffer from pain when he was 22. He had relied on the drug to continue playing football, but eventually announced his retirement on 18 March 2011.

== Personal life ==
Cho is a close friend of Kim Dong-jin, who was also a member of South Korean Olympic team.

Cho appeared in advertisements for Adidas, Cosmopolitan and clothing brand "ASK" in South Korea.

== Career statistics ==
=== Club ===
Appearances and goals by club, season and competition
Club	Season	League			National cup		League cup		Continental		Total	
Club	Season	Division	Apps	Goals	Apps	Goals	Apps	Goals	Apps	Goals	Apps	Goals
Suwon Samsung Bluewings	2000	K League	5	0	?	?	0	0	?	?	5	0
Suwon Samsung Bluewings	2001	K League	3	0	?	?	0	0	?	?	3	0
Suwon Samsung Bluewings	2004	K League	8	1	0	0	0	0	—		8	1
Suwon Samsung Bluewings	Total		16	1	?	?	0	0	?	?	16	1
Gwangju Sangmu Bulsajo (draft)	2002	National Semipro League	?	?	?	?	?	?	—		?	?
Gwangju Sangmu Bulsajo (draft)	2003	K League	31	3	2	1	—		—		33	4
Gwangju Sangmu Bulsajo (draft)	Total		31	3	2	1	?	?	—		33	4
Shimizu S-Pulse	2004	J1 League	12	7	1	0	1	1	—		14	8
Shimizu S-Pulse	2005	J1 League	29	9	3	2	7	3	—		39	14
Shimizu S-Pulse	2006	J1 League	32	16	2	1	3	0	—		37	17
Shimizu S-Pulse	2007	J1 League	28	13	1	0	3	1	—		32	14
Shimizu S-Pulse	Total		101	45	7	3	14	5	—		122	53
Jeonbuk Hyundai Motors	2008	K League	26	8	2	1	5	2	—		33	11
Gamba Osaka	2009	J1 League	25	10	3	0	1	0	6	1	35	11
Gamba Osaka	2010	J1 League	10	0	1	2	1	0	4	0	16	2
Gamba Osaka	Total		35	10	4	2	2	0	10	1	51	13
Career total			209	67	15	7	21	7	10	1	255	82

=== International ===
Appearances and goals by national team and year
National team	Year	Apps	Goals
South Korea	2003	7	2
South Korea	2004	3	1
South Korea	2005	3	0
South Korea	2006	14	5
South Korea	2007	10	2
South Korea	2008	3	0
Career total		40	10

Results list South Korea's goal tally first.

List of international goals scored by Cho Jae-jin
No.	Date	Venue	Opponent	Score	Result	Competition
1	25 September 2003	Incheon Munhak Stadium, Incheon, South Korea	Vietnam	2–0	5–0	2004 AFC Asian Cup qualification
2	24 October 2003	Sultan Qaboos Sports Complex, Muscat, Oman	Nepal	1–0	7–0	2004 AFC Asian Cup qualification
3	19 December 2004	Busan Asiad Main Stadium, Busan, South Korea	Germany	3–1	3–1	Friendly
4	1 February 2006	Hong Kong Stadium, Causeway Bay, Hong Kong	Denmark	1–0	1–3	2006 Lunar New Year Cup
5	26 May 2006	Seoul World Cup Stadium, Seoul, South Korea	Bosnia and Herzegovina	2–0	2–0	Friendly
6	6 September 2006	Suwon World Cup Stadium, Suwon, South Korea	Chinese Taipei	5–0	8–0	2007 AFC Asian Cup qualification
7	6 September 2006	Suwon World Cup Stadium, Suwon, South Korea	Chinese Taipei	7–0	8–0	2007 AFC Asian Cup qualification
8	11 October 2006	Seoul World Cup Stadium, Seoul, South Korea	Syria	1–0	1–1	2007 AFC Asian Cup qualification
9	5 July 2007	Seoul World Cup Stadium, Seoul, South Korea	Uzbekistan	1–0	2–1	Friendly
10	5 July 2007	Seoul World Cup Stadium, Seoul, South Korea	Uzbekistan	2–0	2–1	Friendly

== Filmography ==
=== Television ===
Year	Title	Role	Note(s)	Ref.
2021	Kick a Goal Season 1	Himself		
2021–2022	Kick a Goal Season 2	Himself		
2022–2023	Kick a Goal Season 3	Himself		
2022	The Fishermen and the City Season 4	Himself	Episode 12	

== Honours ==
=== Player ===
Suwon Samsung Bluewings

- Korean League Cup: 2000, 2001
- Korean Super Cup: 2000
- Asian Club Championship: 2000–01
- Asian Super Cup: 2001

Gwangju Sangmu Bulsajo

- Korean National Semipro League (Spring): 2002
- Korean National Semipro Championship runner-up: 2002

Shimizu S-Pulse

- Emperor's Cup runner-up: 2005

Gamba Osaka

- Emperor's Cup: 2009

South Korea

- AFC Asian Cup third place: 2007

=== Television personality ===
List of awards and nominations received by TV personality Cho Jae-jin
Award ceremony	Year	Category	Nominated work	Result	Ref.
SBS Entertainment Awards	2022	Leader of the Year Award (Note: Shared with Ha Seok-ju, Kim Byung-ji, Kim Tae-young, Choi Jin-cheul, Choi Sung-yong, Lee Eul-yong, Hyun Young-min, Lee Young-pyo, Oh Beom-seok and Baek Ji-hoon)	Kick a Goal	Won	
