= Walid Al-Jahdali =

Saudi Arabian footballer

Personal information
- Full name: Walid Abd-Rabo Al-Jahdali
- Date of birth: 1 June 1982 (age 44)
- Place of birth: Jeddah, Saudi Arabia
- Height: 1.79 m (5 ft 10 1/2 in)
- Position: Defender

Youth career
- Al-Ahli

Senior career*
Years	Team	Apps	(Gls)
2000–2010	Al-Ahli	43	(7)
2010–2014	Al-Shabab	5	(0)
2014–2015	Al-Orobah		

International career
2005–?	Saudi Arabia	22	(0)
- * Club domestic league appearances and goals

Walid Abd-Rabo Al-Jahdali (Arabic: وليد عبدربه الجحدلي, born 1 June 1982) is a former Saudi Arabian footballer who played as a defender. He started his career with Al-Ahli and started in four of their 2005 AFC Champions League matches, before leading the Jeddah-based side to the Crown Prince Cup and the Saudi Federation Cup that same season.

Walid made several appearances for the Saudi Arabia national football team, including five FIFA World Cup qualifying matches. He also represented Saudi Arabia at the 2007 AFC Asian Cup.
