= Hawar Mulla Mohammed =

Iraqi footballer

Personal information
- Full name: Hawar Mulla Mohammed Taher
- Date of birth: 1 June 1981 (age 45)
- Place of birth: Mosul, Iraq
- Height: 1.70 m (5 ft 7 in)
- Position: Winger

Youth career
- 1998–2000: Mosul

Senior career*
Years	Team	Apps	(Gls)
2000	Mosul		(0)
2000–2006	Al-Quwa Al-Jawiya		
2006	Ansar	13	(6)
2006–2007	Apollon Limassol	16	(5)
2007	→ Al-Ain (loan)	15	(6)
2007–2008	Al Khor	11	(6)
2008–2009	Anorthosis	24	(6)
2009–2010	Persepolis	17	(5)
2010–2011	Erbil		(6)
2011	Esteghlal	10	(2)
2011–2012	Zob Ahan	11	(1)
2012–2013	Zakho		
2013–2014	Erbil		(3)
2014–2015	Al-Quwa Al-Jawiya		

International career
2001–2012	Iraq	113	(20)
Medal record
Men's football
Representing Iraq
AFC Asian Cup
Winner	2007 Indonesia/Malaysia/ Thailand/Vietnam
- * Club domestic league appearances and goals

Hawar Mulla Mohammed Taher Zebari (Kurdish: هەوار مەلا محەمەد تاهر زێبارى; Arabic: هوار ملا محمد طاهر زيباري; born 1 June 1981) is a Kurdish Iraqi former professional footballer.

He played as a winger or wingback for Al-Quwa Al-Jawiya, Al-Ansar, Apollon Limassol, Al Khor, Anorthosis, Persepolis, Esteghlal, Zob Ahan, and Erbil before retiring on 11 June 2015.

== Career statistics ==
=== International ===
Scores and results list Iraq's goal tally first, score column indicates score after each Mohammed goal.

List of international goals scored by Hawar Mulla Mohammed
No.	Date	Venue	Opponent	Score	Result	Competition	Ref.
1	12 December 2003	Bahrain National Stadium, Manama, Bahrain	Bahrain	2–2	2–2	Friendly	
2	15 December 2003	Bahrain National Stadium, Manama, Bahrain	Kenya	1–0	2–0	Friendly	
3	22 July 2004	Sichuan Longquanyi Stadium, Chengdu, China	Turkmenistan	1–0	3–2	2004 AFC Asian Cup	
4	1 December 2005	Ahmed bin Ali Stadium, Doha, Qatar	Palestine	2–0	4–0	2005 West Asian Games	
5	1 March 2006	Khalifa bin Zayed Stadium, Al Ain, United Arab Emirates	China	2–1	2–1	2007 AFC Asian Cup qualification	
6	6 September 2006	Khalifa bin Zayed Stadium, Al Ain, United Arab Emirates	Palestine	2–1	2–2	2007 AFC Asian Cup qualification	
7	11 October 2006	Khalifa bin Zayed Stadium, Al Ain, United Arab Emirates	Singapore	4–2	4–2	2007 AFC Asian Cup qualification	
8	18 January 2007	Al Nahyan Stadium, Abu Dhabi, United Arab Emirates	Qatar	1–0	1–0	18th Arabian Gulf Cup	
9	21 January 2007	Al Nahyan Stadium, Abu Dhabi, United Arab Emirates	Bahrain	1–1	1–1	18th Arabian Gulf Cup	
10	18 June 2007	Amman International Stadium, Amman, Jordan	Palestine	1–0	1–0	2007 WAFF Championship	
11	13 July 2007	Rajamangala National Stadium, Bangkok, Thailand	Australia	2–1	3–1	2007 AFC Asian Cup	
12	31 January 2008	Al Nahyan Stadium, Abu Dhabi, United Arab Emirates	United Arab Emirates	1–0	1–0	Friendly	
13	6 February 2008	Rashid Stadium, Dubai, United Arab Emirates	China	1–0	1–1	2010 FIFA World Cup qualification	
14	10 July 2009	Franso Hariri Stadium, Erbil, Iraq	Palestine	1–0	3–0	Friendly	
15	13 July 2009	Al-Shaab Stadium, Baghdad, Iraq	Palestine	1–0	4–0	Friendly	
16	25 September 2010	King Abdullah Stadium, Amman, Jordan	Yemen	2–1	2–1	2010 WAFF Championship	
17	26 November 2010	22 May Stadium, Aden, Yemen	Bahrain	3–1	3–2	20th Arabian Gulf Cup	
18	2 December 2010	22 May Stadium, Aden, Yemen	Kuwait	1–1	2–2 (a.e.t.) (4–5 p)	20th Arabian Gulf Cup	
19	23 July 2011	Franso Hariri Stadium, Erbil, Iraq	Yemen	1–0	2–0	2014 FIFA World Cup qualification	
20	29 February 2012	Grand Hamad Stadium, Doha, Qatar	Singapore	3–0	7–1	2014 FIFA World Cup qualification	

== Honours ==
Al-Quwa Al-Jawiya

- Iraqi Premier League: 2004–05; runner-up: 2000–01, 2001–02, 2014–15

Ansar

- Lebanese Premier League: 2005–06
- Lebanese FA Cup: 2005–06

Apollon Limassol

- Cypriot Super Cup: 2006

Persepolis

- Hazfi Cup: 2009–10

Esteghlal

- Persian Gulf Cup runner-up: 2010–11

Erbil

- AFC Cup runner-up: 2014

Iraq

- West Asian Games Gold Medalist: 2005
- AFC Asian Cup: 2007

Individual

- Soccer Iraq Team of the Decade: 2010–2019

== See also ==
- List of men's footballers with 100 or more international caps
