= Qusay Munir =

Iraqi footballer and manager

Qusay Muneer
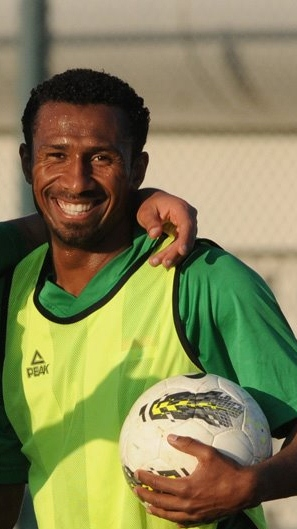
- Munir in 2012

Personal information
- Full name: Qusay Muneer Abboodi Al-Hussein
- Date of birth: 12 April 1981 (age 45)
- Place of birth: Al-Basrah, Iraq
- Height: 1.89 m (6 ft 2 1/2 in)
- Position: Defensive midfielder

Senior career*
| Years | Team | Apps | (Gls) |
| 1998–2003 | Al-Sinaa | | |
| 2003–2004 | Al-Quwa Al-Jawiya | | |
| 2004–2005 | Al-Khor | 22 | (5) |
| 2005–2006 | Al Hazm | 20 | (1) |
| 2006–2007 | Erbil | 18 | (1) |
| 2007–2008 | Sharjah FC | 22 | (0) |
| 2008–2011 | Qatar SC | 66 | (12) |
| 2011 | Erbil | | |
| 2011–2012 | Baghdad | | |
| 2012–2013 | Qatar SC | | |
| 2013 | Baghdad | | |
| 2013–2014 | Al-Shorta | 19 | (0) |
| 2014–2015 | Al-Zawraa | | |

International career
| 2003–2013 | Iraq | 87 | (6) |

Managerial career
- 2017–2018: Al-Diwaniya FC
- 2018–2019: Al-Sinaa SC
- 2020–2021: Al-Diwaniya FC
- 2021: Al-Qasim SC
- 2021: Al-Mina'a SC
Medal record
Men's football
Representing Iraq
AFC Asian Cup
| Winner | 2007 Indonesia/Malaysia/ Thailand/Vietnam |
- * Club domestic league appearances and goals as of 18 August 2017

Qusay Muneer Abboodi Al-Hussein (Arabic: قُصَيّ مُنِير عَبُّودِيّ الْحُسَيْن; born 12 April 1981 in Iraq) is a former footballer and currently head coach of Al-Diwaniya. |Prior to his managerial career Muneer was an acclaimed central midfielder with more than 80 caps for the Iraqi national team, winning the 2007 Asian Cup. Muneer was a well recognised player in the middle east, having played for clubs in Qatar, Saudi Arabia, and the United Arab Emirates.

== Career ==
Qusay Muneer has been one of the revelations after the war, the former attacker turned midfield enforcer had been on the fringes of the Olympic team before the war until Adnan Hamad gave him a chance and handed the 22-year-old player his debut against Syria, Qusay replied with a goal in a convincing 3–1 victory, and has since earned himself a regular place in midfield despite getting himself sent-off only few minutes after scoring the equaliser against Fajr Sepasi F.C. at the 2003 Emir Abdullah Al-Faisal in Abha, Saudi Arabia. Qusay later scored the all-important fourth goal in the 4–1 win over North Korea in Amman; which gave Iraq a place in the last round of the Olympic qualifiers. Shortly after his goal; Qusay was handed his first international call-up by Bernd Stange and took part in Iraq's tour of Australia in Perth and Albany, and came on as a substitute in the first 20 minutes after an injury to Haitham Khadim.

Before his inclusion in the Olympic team, Qusay had been playing as a centre forward for Al-Sinaa, in the Iraqi first division, netting six times, and scoring twice more in the Iraqi Cup during the 2002/2003 season before the league was suspended due to the outbreak of war. In March 2003, he moved to the Air Force Club, Al-Quwa Al-Jawiya, at the end of the war and was praised for his impressive performances in the Iraqi league and the AFC Champions League. Qusay played a short term in Saudi Arabia for Al-Hazem then went to Qatar for Al-Khor before he suffered a serious injury in 2006 cost him 1 year of his professional career, he recovered in 2007 and signed for Arbil FC and in the same year he won the Iraqi League, Qusay called for the 2007 Asian Cup campaign and was part of the Asian Cup champions squad, after the Asian Cup Qusay signed for 1-year contract with the Emirati Club Al-Sharjah.

== Managerial career ==
Qusay Muneer started working towards becoming a football coach shortly after retiring, he obtained his s level C coaching certificate from the AFC in November 2016. He got his first job as a manager when he was appointed by Iraqi First Division League side Al Diwaniyah in March 2017. Qusay impressed in his first stint and finished the season undefeated, winning the Iraqi First Division League title and qualifying to the Iraqi Premier League. He resigned shortly after winning promotion due to "infighting within the management" He is Currently the head coach of Al-Sinaa

== International goals ==
Scores and results list Iraq's goal tally first.

| # | Date | Venue | Opponent | Score | Result | Competition |
|---|---|---|---|---|---|---|
| 1. | 22 July 2004 | Sichuan Stadium, Chengdu | Turkmenistan | 3–2 | 3–2 | 2004 Asian Cup |
| 2. | 13 October 2004 | Amman Stadium, Amman | Uzbekistan | 1–2 | 1–2 | 2006 FIFA World Cup qual. |
| 3. | 16 November 2004 | Al-Gharafa Stadium, Doha | Palestine | 1–0 | 4–1 | 2006 FIFA World Cup qual. |
| 4. | 16 November 2004 | Al-Gharafa Stadium, Doha | Palestine | 2–0 | 4–1 | 2006 FIFA World Cup qual. |
| 5. | 16 December 2004 | Al-Rayyan Stadium, Doha | United Arab Emirates | 1–1 | 1–1 | 17th Arabian Gulf Cup |
| 6. | 15 November 2011 | Amman Stadium, Amman | Jordan | 2–1 | 3–1 | 2014 FIFA World Cup qual. |

== Managerial statistics ==
As of match played 22 October 2021

Managerial record by team and tenure
| Team | From | To | Record | | | | | Ref. |
| Team | From | To | P | W | D | L | Win % | Ref. |
|---|---|---|---|---|---|---|---|---|
| Al-Diwaniya FC | 7 March 2017 | 28 August 2017 | 17 | 12 | 5 | 0 | 70.6 | |
| Al-Sinaa SC | 14 November 2018 | 17 July 2019 | 25 | 20 | 3 | 2 | 80.0 | |
| Al-Diwaniya FC | 8 November 2020 | 6 January 2021 | 10 | 2 | 7 | 1 | 20.0 | |
| Al-Qasim SC | 21 March 2021 | 26 July 2021 | 20 | 8 | 7 | 5 | 40.0 | |
| Al-Mina'a SC | 21 August 2021 | 22 October 2021 | 5 | 0 | 2 | 3 | 0.0 | |
| Total | | | 78 | 42 | 23 | 13 | 53.8 | — |

== Honours ==
=== Player ===
Erbil

- Iraqi Premier League: 2006–07

Qatar SC

- Qatar Crown Prince Cup: 2009
- GCC Champions League runner-up: 2009–10

Iraq

- Asian Cup: 2007
- West Asian Games: 2005

=== Manager ===
Al-Diwaniya

- Iraqi First Division League: 2016–17
