= Noor Sabri =

Iraqi footballer

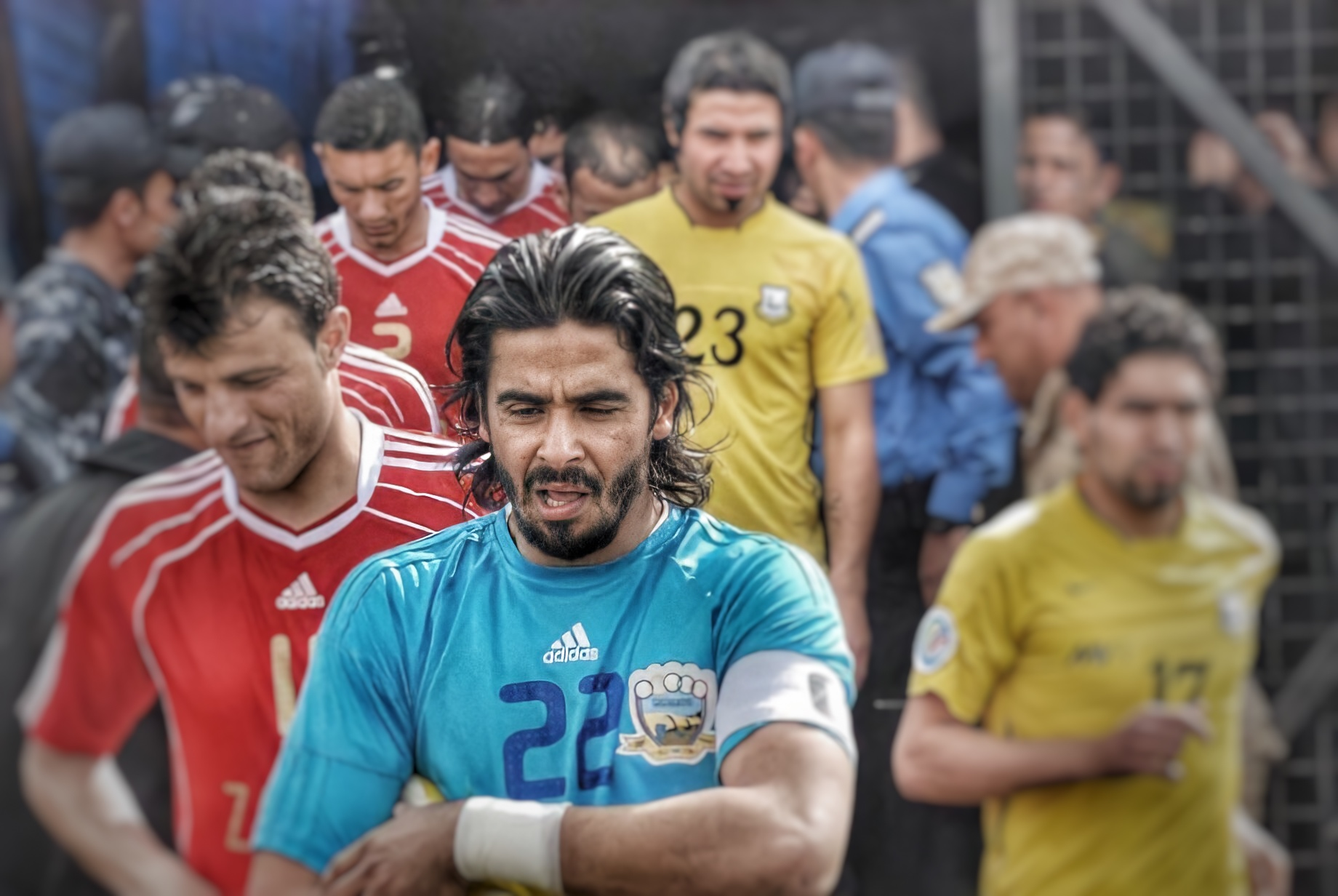
- Noor with Zakho SC in 2010

Personal information
- Full name: Noor Sabri Abbas Hassan; Al-Baidawi
- Date of birth: 18 June 1984 (age 42)
- Place of birth: Baghdad, Iraq
- Height: 1.82 m (6 ft 0 in)
- Position: Goalkeeper

Youth career
- −1998: Al-Sinaa
- 1998–1999: Al-Shorta

Senior career*
Years	Team	Apps	(Gls)
1999–2000	Al-Kadhimiya		(0)
2000–2003	Al-Zawraa		(0)
2003–2004	Al-Quwa Al-Jawiya	4	(0)
2004–2006	Al-Talaba		(0)
2006–2007	Mes Kerman	24	(0)
2007–2008	Duhok		(0)
2008–2009	Al-Talaba		(0)
2009–2010	Al-Quwa Al-Jawiya		(0)
2010–2011	Zakho	30	(0)
2011–2012	Al-Najaf		(0)
2012–2013	Al-Naft	18	(0)
2013–2014	Al-Quwa Al-Jawiya		(0)
2014–2016	Naft Al-Wasat		(0)
2016	Al-Shorta		(0)
2017	Al-Minaa	7	(0)
2017–2018	Al-Talaba		(0)
2018	Naft Al-Wasat		(0)
2018–2019	Hajer	26	(0)
2019–2020	Al-Najaf		
2020–2021	Naft Maysan		
2022	Samarra		

International career^{‡}
2002–2018	Iraq	100	(0)
Medal record
Representing Iraq
Men's Football
AFC Asian Cup
Winner	2007 Indonesia/Malaysia/ Thailand/Vietnam
- * Club domestic league appearances and goals as of 22 April 2018 ‡ National team caps and goals as of 27 March 2018

Noor Sabri Abbas Hasan Al-Baidawi (Arabic: نُور صَبْرِيّ عَبَّاس حَسَن الْبَيْدَاوِيّ), simply known as Noor Sabri (born 18 June 1984 in Baghdad, Iraq) is an Iraqi former professional goalkeeper. He played 16 years for the Iraqi national team and retired from international football in 2018.

== Career ==
Noor Sabri belongs to the country's golden generation that was nurtured by Adnan Hamad. He broke on to the Asian scene in the AFC Youth Championship 2000, when he warmed the bench until the final game against Japan. Despite serving as the replacement for the suspended first choice Ahmed Ali Jaber, Sabri earned praise for keeping Iraq in contention before Emad Mohammed scored the title-winning goal.

He was quickly back on the sidelines as the team played in the subsequent 2001 FIFA U-20 World Cup in Argentina, where they failed to progress beyond the group stage. However, although he served as a back-up to Jaber with the national youth team, Sabri proved a fast learner at the club level and went from strength to strength with Iraqi first division side Al-Zawraa. He saved two penalties in the 2002 WAFF Championship semi-final penalty shootout to help Iraq eliminate rivals Iran on their way to the title. His improvement impressed German coach Bernd Stange so much that the youngster was called into the team that eventually booked a surprise berth to the 2004 Summer Olympics. He started in all six of Iraq's games during their campaign and performed admirably as Iraq stormed into the last four. He won the Damascus International Championship in 2005 with Al-Talaba when they defeated Al-Zawraa 5–4 on penalties in the final with Noor saving two penalties and scoring one himself in the shootout. Like many of his team-mates on the Olympic squad, Sabri graduated to the country's senior team. He went on to make the No. 1 jersey his own in the ensuing years and was part of the side that earned Iraq's maiden continental title in 2007, conceding just two goals throughout Iraq's title-winning campaign.

Sabri impressed throughout the competition as Iraq reached the semi-final, where they were presented with the daunting task of facing the Korea Republic. The two sides remained level at 0–0 after extra time and a penalty shootout beckoned. After both sides were on target in the first three rounds, Sabri made a decisive save by tipping away Yeom Ki-Hun's shot. After Kim Jung-Woo hit the post in their final attempt, it was Sabri and his team-mates who, against all expectations, progressed to the final.

In March 2016, Sabri announced his retirement from international football, adding that the reason is to allow young players an opportunity to represent the Iraqi national team. In March 2018, he returned to the national team to play his 100th match.

On 24 June 2018, Noor Sabri joined Saudi club Hajer.

== Honours ==
Iraq

- 2002 WAFF champions
- 2004 Athens Olympics: fourth place
- 2005 West Asian Games Gold medallist.
- AFC Asian Cup: 2007
- 2012 Arab Nations Cup Bronze medallist

Al-Zawraa

- 2000–01 Iraqi Premier League

Naft Al-Wasat

- 2014–15 Iraqi Premier League

Individual

- 2007 AFC Asian Cup goalkeeper of the tournament
- 21st Arabian Gulf Cup goalkeeper of the tournament.
- Soccer Iraq Team of the Decade: 2010–2019

== Personal life ==
Noor Sabri is sunni

Muslim[9] and married. He has 4 children

== See also ==
- List of men's footballers with 100 or more international caps
