= Saad Kamil Al-Fadhli =

Kuwaiti football referee (born 1963)

Saad Kameel Al-Fadhli
- Full name: Saad Kameel Al-Fadhli
- Born: January 6, 1963 (age 63); Kuwait

International
Years	League	Role
1990s–2002	FIFA-listed	Referee

Saad Kameel Al-Fadhli (Arabic: سعد كميل) (born January 6, 1963) is a former Kuwaiti football referee, best known for supervising three matches at the 2002 FIFA World Cup held in Japan and South Korea.

He was in charge of the FIFA Youth World Cup final in 1997 in Malaysia.

== Withdrawal of Kuwaiti citizenship ==
In March 2024, Kuwaiti authorities announced the withdrawal of Kuwait citizenship from Saad Kamil Al-Fadhli.

Preceded by AFC Asian Cup Final 2000 (United Arab Emirates) Ali Bujsaim	AFC Asian Cup Final Referees; Final 2004 (Kuwait) Saad Kamil Al-Fadhli	Succeeded by AFC Asian Cup Final 2007 (Australia) Mark Alexander Shield
