= Ahmed Al-Mousa =

Saudi Arabian footballer

Personal information
- Full name: Ahmed Sadeeq Eisa Al-Mousa
- Date of birth: 27 January 1981 (age 45)
- Place of birth: Mecca, Saudi Arabia
- Height: 1.76 m (5 ft 9 1/2 in)
- Position: Midfielder

Youth career
- -2001: Wej
- 2001-2002: Al-Ittihad

Senior career*
Years	Team	Apps	(Gls)
2007–2012	Al-Wahda	?	(?)
2012–2013	Al-Fateh	1	(0)

International career
2007–	Saudi Arabia	10	(3)
- * Club domestic league appearances and goals

Ahmed Al Mousa is a former Saudi Arabian footballer. He started his career with Al Ittihad before joining Al-Wahda. He led Al Wahda to third place in the regular season before beating defending champions Al Shabab in the quarter-finals of the league championship play-off.

== International career ==
Ahmed played for Saudi Arabia national football team at the 2007 AFC Asian Cup and 19th Arabian Gulf Cup.

== International goals ==
#	Date	Venue	Opponent	Score	Result	Competition
1	July 18, 2007	Gelora Sriwijaya Stadium, Palembang	Bahrain	4-0	Won	2007 AFC Asian Cup
2	July 22, 2007	Gelora Bung Karno Stadium, Jakarta	Uzbekistan	2-1	Won	2007 AFC Asian Cup
3	January 8, 2009	Royal Oman Police Stadium, Muscat	Yemen	6-0	Won	19th Arabian Gulf Cup

== Family ==
He is the brother of Al Ahli’s Motaz and Al Wahda’s Kamil.
