= Ali Al-Badwawi =

Emirati football referee

- Full name: Ali Hamad Madhad Saif Al-Badwawi
- Born: 22 December 1972 (age 53)

International
Years	League	Role
2005–	FIFA listed	Referee

Ali Hamad Madhad Saif Al-Badwawi (Arabic: علي حمد معضد سيف البدواوي; born 22 December 1972) is an Emirati football referee.

Al-Badwawi became a FIFA referee in 2005. He was a referee at the 2007 and 2011 AFC Asian Cup, as well as the AFC Champions League. In international competitions, he officiated at the 2011 FIFA U-17 World Cup and qualifiers for the 2010 and 2014 World Cups.

In March 2013, FIFA named Al-Badwawi to a list of 52 candidate referees for the 2014 FIFA World Cup. On 2 April 2013, he sent off Anawin Jujeen in AFC Champions League game between Jiangsu Sainty and Buriram United.
