= Bassim Abbas =

Iraqi footballer (born 1982)

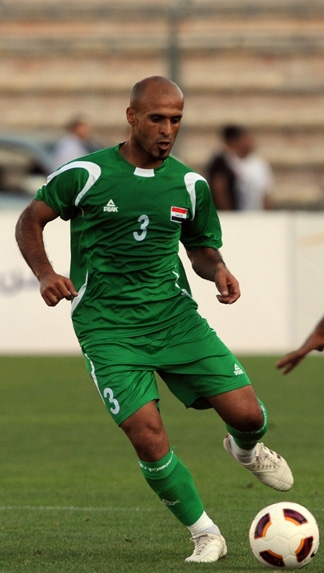
- Abbas with Iraq in 2011

Personal information
- Full name: Bassim Abbas Gatea Al-Ogaili
- Date of birth: 1 July 1982 (age 44)
- Place of birth: Baghdad, Iraq
- Height: 1.65 m (5 ft 5 in)
- Position: Left-back

Senior career*
Years	Team	Apps	(Gls)
2000−2004	Al-Talaba		
2001	→ Al-Zawraa (loan)		
2004−2005	Esteghlal Ahvaz		
2005−2006	Al-Talaba		
2006−2007	Al-Nejmeh		
2007−2008	Al-Arabi		
2008	Umm-Salal		
2008−2009	Al-Talaba		
2009−2010	Diyarbakırspor	18	(0)
2010−2011	Konyaspor	17	(0)
2011−2015	Baghdad	21	(2)
2015	Al-Kahrabaa	2	(0)
2015−2016	Al-Shorta		(0)

International career^{‡}
2001−2012	Iraq	94	(1)
Medal record
Men's football
Representing Iraq
AFC Asian Cup
Winner	2007 Indonesia/Malaysia/ Thailand/Vietnam
- * Club domestic league appearances and goals as of 15 September 2015 ‡ National team caps and goals as of 11 October 2012

Bassim Abbas Gatea Al-Ogaili (Arabic: بَاسِّم عَبَّاس كَاطِع الْعُجَيْلِيّ; born 1 July 1982) is an Iraqi former professional footballer who last played for Al-Shorta.

== Career statistics ==
=== International ===
Scores and results list Iraq's goal tally first.

#	Date	Venue	Opponent	Score	Result	Competition
1.	15 November 2009	Tahnoun bin Mohamed Stadium, Al Ain	Azerbaijan	1–0	1–0	2009 UAE International Cup

== Honours ==
Al-Talaba

- Iraqi Premier League: 2001–02
- Iraq FA Cup: 2001–02, 2002–03
- Iraqi Super Cup: 2002

Umm-Salal

- Emir of Qatar Cup: 2007–08

Iraq

- West Asian Football Federation Championship: 2002
- AFC Asian Cup: 2007

Individual

- AFC Asian Cup Best Defender: 2007
- AFC Asian Cup All-Star XI: 2007
- Lebanese Premier League Team of the Season: 2006–07
