= Haidar Abdul-Amir =

Iraqi footballer (born 1982)

Personal information
- Full name: Haidar Abdul-Amir Hussain
- Date of birth: 2 November 1982 (age 43)
- Place of birth: Baghdad, Iraq
- Height: 1.79 m (5 ft 10 in)
- Position: Full back

Team information
- Current team: Al-Zawraa

Youth career
- 1995–1998: Al-Karkh

Senior career*
Years	Team	Apps	(Gls)
1998–1999	Al-Shorta		
1999–2006	Al-Zawraa		
2006–2008	Al-Faisaly	26	(3)
2008–2009	Shabab Al-Ordon		
2009–2010	Al-Zawraa		
2010–2011	Erbil SC		
2011–2012	Al-Talaba		
2012–2018	Al-Zawraa		

International career^{‡}
2004–2010	Iraq	64	(3)

Managerial career
- 2019–2020: Al-Zawraa (Assist.)
- 2020–2021: Al-Zawraa (Caretaker)
- 2021–2022: Al-Zawraa (Assist.)
- 2021–2022: Al-Zawraa (Caretaker)
- 2022–2023: Zakho
- 2023: Al-Zawraa
- 2024: Erbil SC
- 2024–: Al-Hudood SC
- * Club domestic league appearances and goals as of 12 March 2018 ‡ National team caps and goals as of 17 November 2010

Haidar Abdul-Amir Hussain (Arabic: حَيْدَر عَبْد الْأَمِير حُسَيْن; born 2 November 1982) is a former Iraqi football defender. He last played for the Al-Zawraa football club in Iraq, and was known as one of the calmest players in Iraq.

== Information ==
Haidar Abdul Amer played four matches in the 2004 AFC Asian Cup and his solid defending ensured a move from 11-time Iraq league champions Al Zawra’a to Jordan's Al Faisaly at the start of the 2006/07 season. He led the 30-time Jordan league champions to their second consecutive AFC Cup title in November 2006, scoring a vital goal in the second leg of the final against Muharraq.

== International goals ==
Scores and results list Iraq's goal tally first.

#	Date	Venue	Opponent	Score	Result	Competition
1.	13 December 2004	Jassim Bin Hamad Stadium, Doha	Qatar	3–3	3-3	17th Arabian Gulf Cup
2.	15 March 2006	Prince Abdullah Al-Faisal Stadium, Jeddah	Saudi Arabia	2–2	2-2	Friendly match

== Coaching career ==
=== Al-Zawraa SC ===
On 24 February 2019, Hakeem Shaker agreed with Al-Zawraa SC to lead the club, and took Haider Abdul Amer as an assistant coach.

=== Zakho SC ===
On 30 October 2022, Haidar Abdul-Amir became the team's coach after Hamza Hadi resigned as Zakho SC coach because of his bad results.

- This was the first time in his sports life that Haider became the main coach of a team.

== Managerial statistics ==
As of match played 26 December 2021

Managerial record by team and tenure
Team	From	To	Record					Ref.
Team	From	To	P	W	D	L	Win %	Ref.
Al-Zawraa SC (Caretaker)	30 December 2020	3 January 2021	1	1	0	0	100.0	
Al-Zawraa SC (Caretaker)	22 December 2021	""Present""	1	0	1	0	0.0	
Total			2	1	1	0	50.0	—

== Honours ==
=== Club ===
Al-Zawraa

- Iraqi Premier League: 1999–2000, 2000–01, 2005–06, 2015–16, 2017–18
- Iraq FA Cup: 2016–17
- Iraqi Super Cup: 2017

Al-Faisaly

- AFC Cup: 2006

=== Country ===
- 4th place in 2004 Athens Olympics
- 2005 West Asian Games Gold medallist.
- 2007 Asian Cup winner
