= Kamel Al-Mousa =

Saudi Arabian footballer

Personal information
- Full name: Kamel Sadeeq Eisa Al-Mousa
- Date of birth: 29 August 1982 (age 44)
- Place of birth: Makkah, Saudi Arabia
- Height: 1.77 m (5 ft 9 1/2 in)
- Positions: Center back; left back

Youth career
- –2002: Wej SC
- 2002: Al-Wahda FC

Senior career*
Years	Team	Apps	(Gls)
2003–2010	Al-Wahda FC	149	(8)
2006–2007	→ Al-Hilal (loan)	22	(0)
2010–2016	Al-Ahli	88	(4)
2016–2017	Al-Wahda FC		

International career
2003–2013	Saudi Arabia	21	(0)
- * Club domestic league appearances and goals

Kamel Al Mousa (Arabic: كامل الموسى; born 29 August 1982) is a Saudi Arabian former football player. He previously played for Al-Wahda FC, Al-Hilal, Al-Ahli, and the Saudi Arabia national team.

== Career ==
In 2002 at age 19, Kamel signed for Al-Wahda from Wej SC. He then spent time at the club but in 2006 he was loaned out to Al-Hilal. Kamel spent the whole season there, but upon his return to Al-Wahda, he received more playing time and eventually became a regular player for the team, eventually reaching the coveted 100th appearance for his club. In 2010, Kamel signed for Al-Ahli. He spent 5 full seasons at the club but in 2016, he signed on a free transfer to return to Al-Wahda. But after one season on 5 November 2017, Kamel Al-Mousa announced his retirement from football.

Kamel has 4 brothers who are or were professional footballers. His brother Rabee Al-Mousa also played for Al-Ahli and he most recently played for Al-Wahda. His brother Rayan Al-Mousa is currently playing for Al-Ahli. His brother Redwan Al-Mousa is currently not on a roster but he most recently played for Al-Ansar. His brother Moataz Al-Mousa is a retired player who most recently played for Al-Wahda.

== International career ==
he played for Saudi Arabia national football team as in AFC Asian Cup 2007 and AFC Asian Cup 2011

== Club Goals ==
#	Date	Club	Opponent	Score	Result	Competition
1	27 February 2004	Al Wehda	Al Nassr	2–2	Draw	Saudi Premier League
2	10 March 2005	Al Wehda	Al-Ahli	1–5	Lost	Saudi Premier League
3	12 May 2005	Al Wehda	Ohud	5–0	Won	Saudi Premier League
4	29 October 2006	Al Wehda	Al-Hazm	5–2	Won	Saudi Premier League
5	17 September 2007	Al Wehda	Al-Sekka Al-Hadid	8–0	Won	Arab Champions League
6	29 November 2007	Al Wehda	Najran	6–0	Won	Saudi Premier League
7	10 December 2007	Al Wehda	Al-Ahli	1–1	Draw	Saudi Premier League
8	7 February 2008	Al Wehda	Al-Ittihad	4–2	Won	Saudi Federation cup
9	10 March 2011	Al-Ahli	Dubai	4–2	Won	Friendly match
10	11 February 2011	Al-Ahli	Najran	2–1	Won	Saudi Premier League
11	11 January 2012	Al-Ahli	Najran	4–0	Won	Saudi Premier League
12	25 March 2012	Al-Ahli	Al-Qadisiyah	3–0	Won	Saudi Premier League
13	18 April 2012	Al-Ahli	Al-Nassr	3–1	Won	2012 AFC Champions League

== Honours ==
=== Club ===
- With Al-Wahda FC
  Saudi First Division: 2002–03
- With Al-Hilal
  Saudi Crown Prince Cup: 2006
- With Al-Ahli
  Saudi Champions Cup: 2011, 2012, 2016
  Saudi Crown Prince Cup: 2014–15
  Saudi Professional League: 2015–16

=== International ===
Saudi Arabia

- AFC Asian Cup

2007 : Runner up
2011 : Group Stage

- Islamic Solidarity Games: 2005
