= Ahmed Al-Bahri =

Saudi Arabian footballer

Personal information
- Full name: Ahmed Nasser Al-Bahri
- Date of birth: September 18, 1980 (age 46)
- Place of birth: Riyadh, Saudi Arabia
- Height: 1.78 m (5 ft 10 in)
- Position: Midfielder

Senior career*
Years	Team	Apps	(Gls)
1999–2007	Al-Ittifaq		
2006	→ Al-Shabab (loan)		
2007–2010	Al-Nassr		
2010–2013	Al-Ittifaq	14	(1)
2011–2012	→ Al-Faisaly (loan)	6	(0)

International career^{‡}
2002–2009	Saudi Arabia	41	(0)
- * Club domestic league appearances and goals as of 15 June 2011 ‡ National team caps and goals as of 23 June 2006

Ahmed Nasser Al-Bahri (Arabic: أحمد البحري; born 18 September 1980) is a Saudi Arabian former footballer. He also holds Emirati citizenship.

== Honours ==
=== International ===
Saudi Arabia

- Islamic Solidarity Games: 2005
