= Abdulrahman Al-Qahtani =

Saudi Arabian footballer

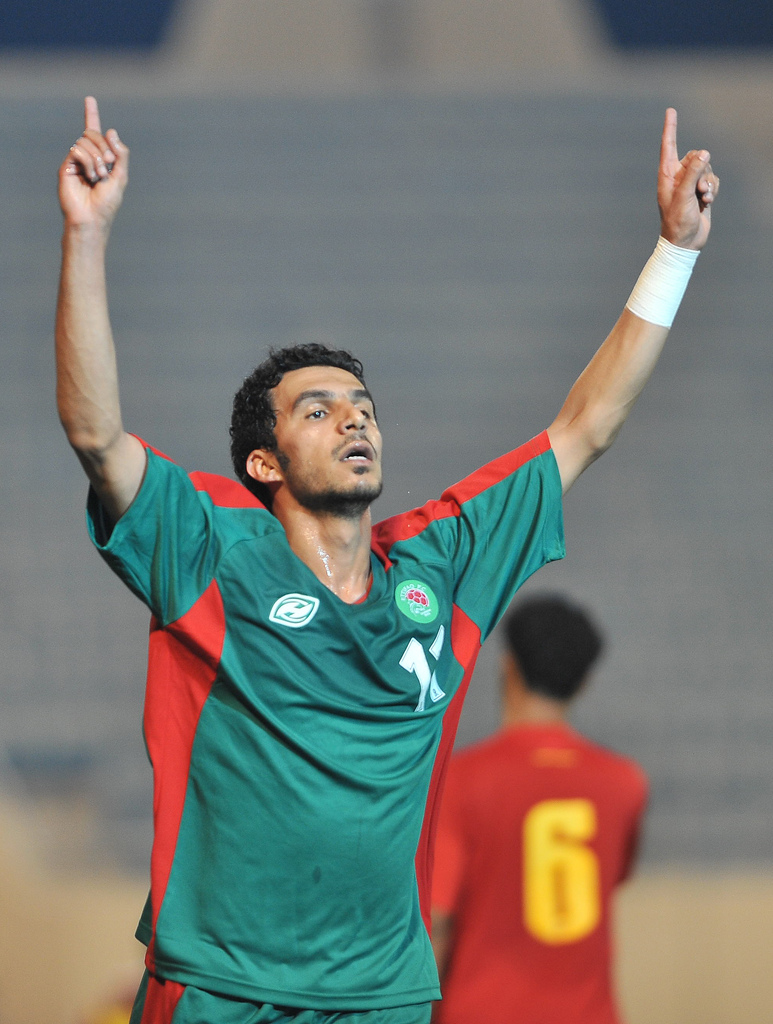

Personal information
- Full name: Abdulrahman Ali Al-Qahtani
- Date of birth: May 22, 1983 (age 43)
- Place of birth: Dammam, Saudi Arabia
- Height: 1.78 m (5 ft 10 in)
- Position: Left winger

Senior career*
Years	Team	Apps	(Gls)
2001–2007	Ettifaq	41	(9)
2007–2008	Al Ittihad	17	(1)
2008–2010	Ettifaq	40	(7)
2010–2013	Al-Nassr	43	(5)
2013–2014	Al-Fateh	9	(0)

International career
2005–2009	Saudi Arabia	23	(2)
- * Club domestic league appearances and goals

Abdulrahman Ali Al-Qahtani (Arabic: عبدالرحمن علي القحطاني; born 22 May 1983) is a former Saudi Arabian footballer. He started his career with Ettifaq in 2001 and he played for the team until 2007 when he was loaned to Ittihad in an 8.5 million riyals deal, which was the most expensive locally. After that he returned to Ettifaq. After two years at Nassr, he had made a 17 million riyals deal for four years, but he gave a poor performance in comparison to his price. His most famous nicknames is "The Maestro" because of his way to move and play making. Al Qahtani has made several appearances for the Saudi Arabia national football team, including two qualifying matches for the 2010 FIFA World Cup.

== Honours ==
=== Club ===
Al Fateh

- Saudi Super Cup : 2013

=== International ===
Saudi Arabia

- Islamic Solidarity Games: 2005
- AFC Asian Cup : Runner-up 2007
