= Khaled Aziz =

Saudi Arabian footballer (born 1981)

Personal information
- Full name: Khaled Aziz Al-Thaker
- Date of birth: 14 July 1981 (age 45)
- Place of birth: Riyadh, Saudi Arabia
- Height: 1.73 m (5 ft 8 in)
- Position: Midfielder

Youth career
- 1999-2002: Al-Hilal

Senior career*
Years	Team	Apps	(Gls)
2002–2011	Al-Hilal	203	(9)
2011	Al-Shabab FC	0	(0)
2012	Al Nassr FC	8	(0)
Total		211	(9)

International career^{‡}
2005–2009	Saudi Arabia	63	(1)
- * Club domestic league appearances and goals as of 15 June 2006 ‡ National team caps and goals as of 23 June 2006

Khaled Aziz Al-Thaker (Arabic: خالد عزيز; born 14 July 1981) is a Saudi Arabian former footballer who played as a midfielder.

He played for Saudi Arabian multi-sports club Al Hilal during the AFC Champions League in 2009-2011, and was called up to the squad at the 2006 FIFA World Cup.
