= 2007 AFC Asian Cup =

Piala Asia 2007; เอเชียนคัพ 2007; Cúp bóng đá châu Á 2007

Tournament details
- Host countries: Indonesia; Malaysia; Thailand; Vietnam
- Dates: 7–29 July
- Teams: 16 (from 1 confederation)
- Venues: 8 (in 7 host cities)

Final positions
- Champions: Iraq (1st title)
- Runners-up: Saudi Arabia
- Third place: South Korea
- Fourth place: Japan

Tournament statistics
- Matches played: 32
- Goals scored: 84 (2.63 per match)
- Attendance: 724,222 (22,632 per match)
- Top scorer(s): (Iraq) Younis Mahmoud (Japan) Naohiro Takahara (Saudi Arabia) Yasser Al-Qahtani (4 goals each)
- Best player: (Iraq) Younis Mahmoud
- Best goalkeeper: (Iraq) Noor Sabri
- Fair play award: Japan

The 2007 AFC Asian Cup was the 14th edition of the men's AFC Asian Cup, a quadrennial international football tournament organised by the Asian Football Confederation (AFC). The finals were held from 7 to 29 July 2007. For the first time in its history, the competition was co-hosted by four countries in Southeast Asia: Indonesia, Malaysia, Thailand and Vietnam; it was the first time in football history that more than two countries joined as hosts of a major continental competition and the only one to have ever taken place until UEFA Euro 2020.

Iraq won the continental title for the first time after defeating three-time champion Saudi Arabia 1–0 in the final. As the winner, Iraq represented the AFC in the 2009 FIFA Confederations Cup.

Before 2007, Asia held its continental tournament every four years from 1956 until 2004. With the Summer Olympic Games and the European Football Championship also held in the same year as the Asian Cup, the AFC changed their tradition. From 2007, AFC decided to hold its continental tournament a year earlier, and every four years henceforth from that date.

An estimated worldwide television audience of 650 million people tuned in to watch the 2007 AFC Asian Cup.

== Venues ==
Location of the host cities of the 2007 AFC Asian Cup

Since the tournament, the Shah Alam Stadium has been demolished. The Rajamangala Stadium, the Mỹ Đình National Stadium, the Gelora Bung Karno Stadium, the Bukit Jalil National Stadium and the Gelora Sriwijaya Stadium have all been moderately or heavily modified. The Supachalasai Stadium and the Army Stadium are the only largely unmodified stadiums used for this tournament.

City	Stadium	Capacity	Image
(Thailand) Bangkok	Rajamangala Stadium	49,722	
(Thailand) Bangkok	Supachalasai Stadium	19,793	
(Vietnam) Hanoi	Mỹ Đình National Stadium	40,192	
(Vietnam) Ho Chi Minh City	Army Stadium	25,000	
(Indonesia) Jakarta	Gelora Bung Karno Stadium	88,083	
(Malaysia) Kuala Lumpur	Bukit Jalil National Stadium	87,411	
(Indonesia) Palembang	Gelora Sriwijaya Stadium	30,000	
(Malaysia) Shah Alam	Shah Alam Stadium	80,372	

== Qualification ==
The qualification ran from 22 February 2006 to 15 November 2006. For the first time, the defending champions (in this tournament, Japan) did not get automatic qualification. Indonesia, Malaysia, Thailand, and Vietnam automatically qualified as co-hosts. Twenty-four teams were split into six groups of four to compete for the 12 remaining spots in the final tournament.

=== Qualified teams ===
Of the 16 teams appearing, 13 teams were returning after appearing in the 2004 edition.

Co-hosts Vietnam and Malaysia qualified for the first time since 1960 and 1980 respectively. Australia participated and qualified for the AFC Asian Cup for the first time after moving from OFC to AFC in 2006.

As of 2027 edition, this was the last time Jordan failed to qualify for the AFC Asian Cup.

Team	Qualified as	Date qualification was secured	Previous appearances in tournament^{1, 2}
Indonesia	Co-hosts	7 August 2004	3 (1996, 2000, 2004)
Malaysia	Co-hosts	7 August 2004	2 (1976, 1980)
Thailand	Co-hosts	7 August 2004	5 (1972, 1992, 1996, 2000, 2004)
Vietnam^{3}	Co-hosts	7 August 2004	2 (1956^{4}, 1960^{4})
Australia	Group D winner	16 August 2006	0 (debut)
Qatar	Group F winner	6 September 2006	6 (1980, 1984, 1988, 1992, 2000, 2004)
Japan	Group A winner	6 September 2006	5 (1988, **1992**, 1996, **2000**, **2004**)
Saudi Arabia	Group A runner-up	6 September 2006	6 (**1984**, **1988**, 1992, **1996**, 2000, 2004)
Iran	Group B winner	11 October 2006	10 (**1968**, **1972**, **1976**, 1980, 1984, 1988, 1992, 1996, 2000, 2004)
South Korea	Group B runner-up	11 October 2006	10 (**1956**, **1960**, 1964, 1972, 1980, 1984, 1988, 1996, 2000, 2004)
United Arab Emirates	Group C winner	11 October 2006	6 (1980, 1984, 1988, 1992, 1996, 2004)
Oman	Group C runner-up	11 October 2006	1 (2004)
Iraq	Group E winner	11 October 2006	5 (1972, 1976, 1996, 2000, 2004)
China	Group E runner-up	11 October 2006	8 (1976, 1980, 1984, 1988, 1992, 1996, 2000, 2004)
Bahrain	Group D runner-up	15 November 2006	2 (1988, 2004)
Uzbekistan	Group F runner-up	15 November 2006	3 (1996, 2000, 2004)

^{1} Bold indicates champion for that year
^{2} Italic indicates host
^{3} Vietnam's debut since the reunification of Vietnam in 1976
^{4} As South Vietnam

== Seeds ==
For the first time, the seeds are based on the October 2006 FIFA World Rankings instead of the basis of the performance from the previous AFC Asian Cup competition. This was to ensure that the same number of strong teams do not meet in the early stage.

The four seeded teams were announced on 19 December 2006. The seeds comprised Pot 4 in the draw. Pot 1 consists of the teams from all co-hosts.

Pot 1	Pot 2	Pot 3	Pot 4
Indonesia (153); Malaysia (152); Thailand (137); Vietnam (172)	China (84); Iraq (83); United Arab Emirates (87); Bahrain (97)	Qatar (58); Uzbekistan (45); Saudi Arabia (64); Oman (72)	Australia (39); Iran (38); Japan (47); South Korea (51)

The draw was held on 19 December 2006 at the Kuala Lumpur Convention Centre.

== Officials ==
16 referees and 24 assistant referees were officially cleared following a fitness test on 2 July in Kuala Lumpur, Malaysia. One referee and two assistant referees were also named from the CAF.

Referees

- (Australia) Matthew Breeze
- (Australia) Mark Shield
- (Bahrain) Jasim Karim
- (China) Sun Baojie
- (Iran) Masoud Moradi
- (Japan) Yuichi Nishimura
- (Kuwait) Saad Kamil Al-Fadhli
- (Lebanon) Talaat Najm
- (Qatar) Abdulrahman Abdou
- (Saudi Arabia) Khalil Al-Ghamdi
- (Seychelles) Eddy Maillet
- (South Korea) Kwon Jong-chul
- (South Korea) Lee Gi-young
- (Syria) Muhsen Basma
- (Thailand) Satop Tongkhan (†)
- (United Arab Emirates) Ali Al-Badwawi

Assistant Referees

- (Bangladesh) Mohd. Shahidul Islam
- (China) Liu Tiejun
- (Cameroon) Evarist Menkouande
- (Hong Kong) Poon Ming Fai
- (India) Benjamin Silva
- (Iran) Reza Sokhandan
- (Iraq) Mohammad Kadom Arab
- (Jordan) Awni Hassouneh
- (Japan) Toru Sagara
- (South Korea) Jeong Hae-sang
- (Saudi Arabia) Mohammed Al-Ghamdi
- (Kuwait) Yaser Ahmad Marad
- (Lebanon) Mustafa Taleb
- (Malaysia) Mohd. Sabri bin Mat Daud
- (Myanmar) Win U Kyaw
- (Maldives) Mohamed Saeed
- (Oman) Abdullah Al-Amouri
- (Qatar) Ibrahim Ali Mohammed
- (Rwanda) Célestin Ntagungira
- (Singapore) Yew Mun Tang
- (Syria) Hamdi Al-Kadri
- (Turkmenistan) Begench Allaberdiyev
- (United Arab Emirates) Saleh Al-Marzouqi
- (Uzbekistan) Viktor Serazitdinov

(†): Replaced (Singapore) Shamsul Maidin after he pulled out with injury.

== Tournament summary ==
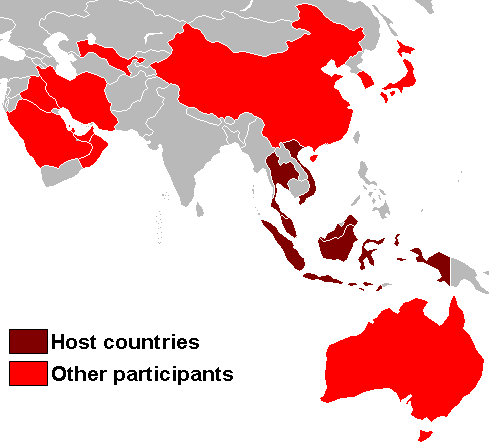
Participating countries.

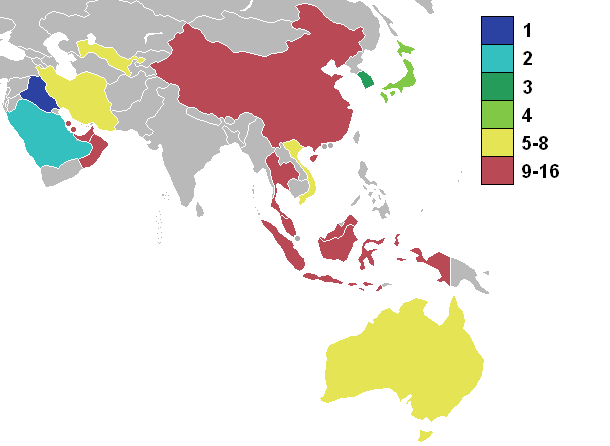
Results of the participating teams

The Asian Cup saw many upsets in the early stages of the tournament, with tournament favourites Australia and South Korea performing poorly in the group stage.

In Group A, Oman held the Socceroos to a surprising draw. The Omanis took the lead and would have won, if not for an injury time goal from Tim Cahill. Next, joint hosts and the lowest-ranked team in the competition, Vietnam, shocked the UAE with a 2–0 victory. In the same group, Qatar held Japan to a shock 1–1 draw. The result caused Japan's coach Ivica Osim to fly into a rage in which he branded his players as 'amateurs' and reduced his interpreter to tears. In Group D, Indonesia continued the undefeated streak of the hosts by defeating Bahrain 2–1. Malaysia ended up as the only host country to lose their opening match after a crushing 5–1 defeat to China. Thailand recorded just their 2nd win in the Asian Cup finals (their other was in 1972 against Cambodia), and its first ever win in regulation, when they beat Oman 2–0 on 12 July. Meanwhile, Australia was upset by a 3–1 defeat to Iraq the following day, leaving them floundering in third place in their group despite high expectations. However, Australia's 4–0 demolition of Thailand at the last match day saw them move on to the quarter-finals, as Oman was unable to overcome Iraq in a goalless draw.

Vietnam continued to stun all predictions when they drew 1–1 with 2006 ASIAD champions Qatar, while Japan finally got their first win when they thrashed the UAE 3–1. Although Vietnam lost 1–4 to Japan, the UAE's 2–1 comeback win over Qatar resulted in Vietnam's first ever qualification into the next round. They became the only host to progress through despite being in a group with three different champions. On the other hand, Malaysia continued its poor form with 0–5 and 0–2 losses to Uzbekistan and Iran, exiting the tournament without a single point. China's shocking elimination occurred when they were hammered 0–3 by the Uzbeks, despite having drawn 2–2 with Iran and was expected to qualify from group stage with an easy win.

Bahrain shocked the whole tournament by defeating South Korea 2–1 in Group D, leaving the Koreans on the verge of elimination when Indonesia was beaten 1–2 by Saudi Arabia. However, South Korea secured a 1–0 win over hosts Indonesia and with Saudi Arabia destroying Bahrain 4–0, it was enough for the Koreans to qualify to the quarter-finals.

In the quarter-finals, Iraq defeated Vietnam 2–0, while South Korea needed a penalty shootout to eliminate Iran 4–2. Japan also needed a penalty shootout to defeat Australia 4–3 (this was the first time Australia's goalkeeper Mark Schwarzer had ever come out on the losing end of a penalty shoot-out), and Saudi Arabia won over Uzbekistan 2–1. Iraq upset the Koreans in the semi-finals by winning 4–3 on penalties, resulting in thousands of Iraqis celebrating in the streets of Baghdad. Over 50 Iraqis were killed by terrorist bombs targeting these crowds. In the other semi-finals, Saudi Arabia eliminated defending champions Japan after a 3–2 win to make the final match an all-Arab affair.

Iraq went on to defeat the Saudis 1–0, taking the Asian Cup title. Iraqi forward and captain Younis Mahmoud was given the title of Most Valuable Player. South Korea took third place, narrowly beating Japan 6–5 on penalties. It was the third consecutive match in the tournament that South Korea drew 0–0 before a penalty shootout. Iraq, Saudi Arabia and South Korea, as the top three teams in the tournament, all received automatic berths to the 2011 Asian Cup along with the next hosts Qatar.

== Group stage ==
=== Group A ===
Pos	Team	Pld	W	D	L	GF	GA	GD	Pts	Qualification
1	Iraq	3	1	2	0	4	2	+2	5	Advance to knockout stage
2	Australia	3	1	1	1	6	4	+2	4	Advance to knockout stage
3	Thailand (H)	3	1	1	1	3	5	−2	4	
4	Oman	3	0	2	1	1	3	−2	2	

Source: Asian Cup 2007
Rules for classification: Tiebreakers
(H) Hosts
7 July 2007
19:30 UTC+7

Thailand	1–1	Iraq
Sutee 6' (pen.)	Report	Mahmoud 32'

Rajamangala Stadium, Bangkok
Attendance: 30,000
Referee: Kwon Jong-Chul (South Korea)
8 July 2007
17:15 UTC+7

Australia	1–1	Oman
Cahill 90+2'	Report	Al-Maimani 32'

Rajamangala Stadium, Bangkok
Attendance: 5,000
Referee: Eddy Maillet (Seychelles)

12 July 2007
17:15 UTC+7

Oman	0–2	Thailand
	Report	Pipat 70', 78'

Rajamangala Stadium, Bangkok
Attendance: 19,000
Referee: Lee Gi-Young (South Korea)
13 July 2007
17:15 UTC+7

Iraq	3–1	Australia
Akram 22'; Hawar 60'; Jassim 86'	Report	Viduka 47'

Rajamangala Stadium, Bangkok
Attendance: 7,884
Referee: Jasim Karim (Bahrain)

16 July 2007
19:30 UTC+7

Thailand	0–4	Australia
	Report	Beauchamp 21'; Viduka 80', 83'; Kewell 90'

Rajamangala Stadium, Bangkok
Attendance: 46,000
Referee: Kwon Jong-Chul (South Korea)
16 July 2007
19:30 UTC+7

Oman	0–0	Iraq
	Report

National Stadium, Bangkok
Attendance: 500
Referee: Eddy Maillet (Seychelles)

=== Group B ===
Pos	Team	Pld	W	D	L	GF	GA	GD	Pts	Qualification
1	Japan	3	2	1	0	8	3	+5	7	Advance to knockout stage
2	Vietnam (H)	3	1	1	1	4	5	−1	4	Advance to knockout stage
3	United Arab Emirates	3	1	0	2	3	6	−3	3	
4	Qatar	3	0	2	1	3	4	−1	2	

Source: AFC
Rules for classification: Tiebreakers
(H) Hosts
8 July 2007
19:30 UTC+7

Vietnam	2–0	United Arab Emirates
Huỳnh Quang Thanh 64'; Lê Công Vinh 73'	Report

Mỹ Đình Stadium, Hanoi
Attendance: 39,450
Referee: Talaat Najm (Lebanon)
9 July 2007
17:15 UTC+7

Japan	1–1	Qatar
Takahara 61'	Report	Soria 88'

Mỹ Đình Stadium, Hanoi
Attendance: 5,000
Referee: Matthew Breeze (Australia)

12 July 2007
19:30 UTC+7

Qatar	1–1	Vietnam
Soria 79'	Report	Phan Thanh Bình 32'

Mỹ Đình Stadium, Hanoi
Attendance: 40,000
Referee: Masoud Moradi (Iran)
13 July 2007
20:30 UTC+7

United Arab Emirates	1–3	Japan
Al-Kass 66'	Report	Takahara 22', 27'; S. Nakamura 42' (pen.)

Mỹ Đình Stadium, Hanoi
Attendance: 5,000
Referee: Satop Tongkhan (Thailand)

16 July 2007
17:15 UTC+7

Vietnam	1–4	Japan
Suzuki 8' (o.g.)	Report	Maki 12', 59'; Endō 31'; S. Nakamura 53'

Mỹ Đình Stadium, Hanoi
Attendance: 40,000
Referee: Matthew Breeze (Australia)
16 July 2007
17:15 UTC+7

Qatar	1–2	United Arab Emirates
Soria 42' (pen.)	Report	Al-Kass 60'; Khalil 90+4'

Army Stadium, Ho Chi Minh City
Attendance: 3,000
Referee: Masoud Moradi (Iran)

=== Group C ===
Pos	Team	Pld	W	D	L	GF	GA	GD	Pts	Qualification
1	Iran	3	2	1	0	6	3	+3	7	Advance to knockout stage
2	Uzbekistan	3	2	0	1	9	2	+7	6	Advance to knockout stage
3	China	3	1	1	1	7	6	+1	4	
4	Malaysia (H)	3	0	0	3	1	12	−11	0	

Source: Asian Cup 2007
Rules for classification: Tiebreakers
(H) Hosts
10 July 2007
20:30 UTC+8

Malaysia	1–5	China
Indra Putra 74'	Report	Han Peng 15', 55'; Shao Jiayi 36'; Wang Dong 51', 90+3'

Bukit Jalil Stadium, Kuala Lumpur
Attendance: 21,155
Referee: Muhsen Basma (Syria)
11 July 2007
18:15 UTC+8

Iran	2–1	Uzbekistan
Hosseini 55'; Kazemian 78'	Report	Rezaei 16' (o.g.)

Bukit Jalil Stadium, Kuala Lumpur
Attendance: 1,863
Referee: Saad Kamil Al-Fadhli (Kuwait)

14 July 2007
18:15 UTC+8

Uzbekistan	5–0	Malaysia
Shatskikh 10', 89'; Kapadze 30'; Bakayev 45+2' (pen.); Ibrahimov 85'	Report

Bukit Jalil Stadium, Kuala Lumpur
Attendance: 7,137
Referee: Abdulrahman Abdou (Qatar)
15 July 2007
18:15 UTC+8

China	2–2	Iran
Shao Jiayi 7'; Mao Jianqing 33'	Report	Zandi 45+1'; Nekounam 74'

Bukit Jalil Stadium, Kuala Lumpur
Attendance: 5,938
Referee: Khalil Al-Ghamdi (Saudi Arabia)

18 July 2007
20:30 UTC+8

Malaysia	0–2	Iran
	Report	Nekounam 29' (pen.); Teymourian 77'

Bukit Jalil Stadium, Kuala Lumpur
Attendance: 4,520
Referee: Muhsen Basma (Syria)
18 July 2007
20:30 UTC+8

Uzbekistan	3–0	China
Shatskikh 72'; Kapadze 86'; Geynrikh 90+4'	Report

Shah Alam Stadium, Shah Alam
Attendance: 2,200
Referee: Saad Kamil Al-Fadhli (Kuwait)

=== Group D ===
Pos	Team	Pld	W	D	L	GF	GA	GD	Pts	Qualification
1	Saudi Arabia	3	2	1	0	7	2	+5	7	Advance to knockout stage
2	South Korea	3	1	1	1	3	3	0	4	Advance to knockout stage
3	Indonesia (H)	3	1	0	2	3	4	−1	3	
4	Bahrain	3	1	0	2	3	7	−4	3	

Source: Asian Cup 2007
Rules for classification: Tiebreakers
(H) Hosts
10 July 2007
17:15 UTC+7

Indonesia	2–1	Bahrain
Budi 14'; Bambang 64'	Report	Jalal 27'

Gelora Bung Karno Stadium, Jakarta
Attendance: 60,000
Referee: Yuichi Nishimura (Japan)
11 July 2007
19:30 UTC+7

South Korea	1–1	Saudi Arabia
Choi Sung-kuk 66'	Report	Y. Al-Qahtani 77' (pen.)

Gelora Bung Karno Stadium, Jakarta
Attendance: 15,000
Referee: Mark Shield (Australia)

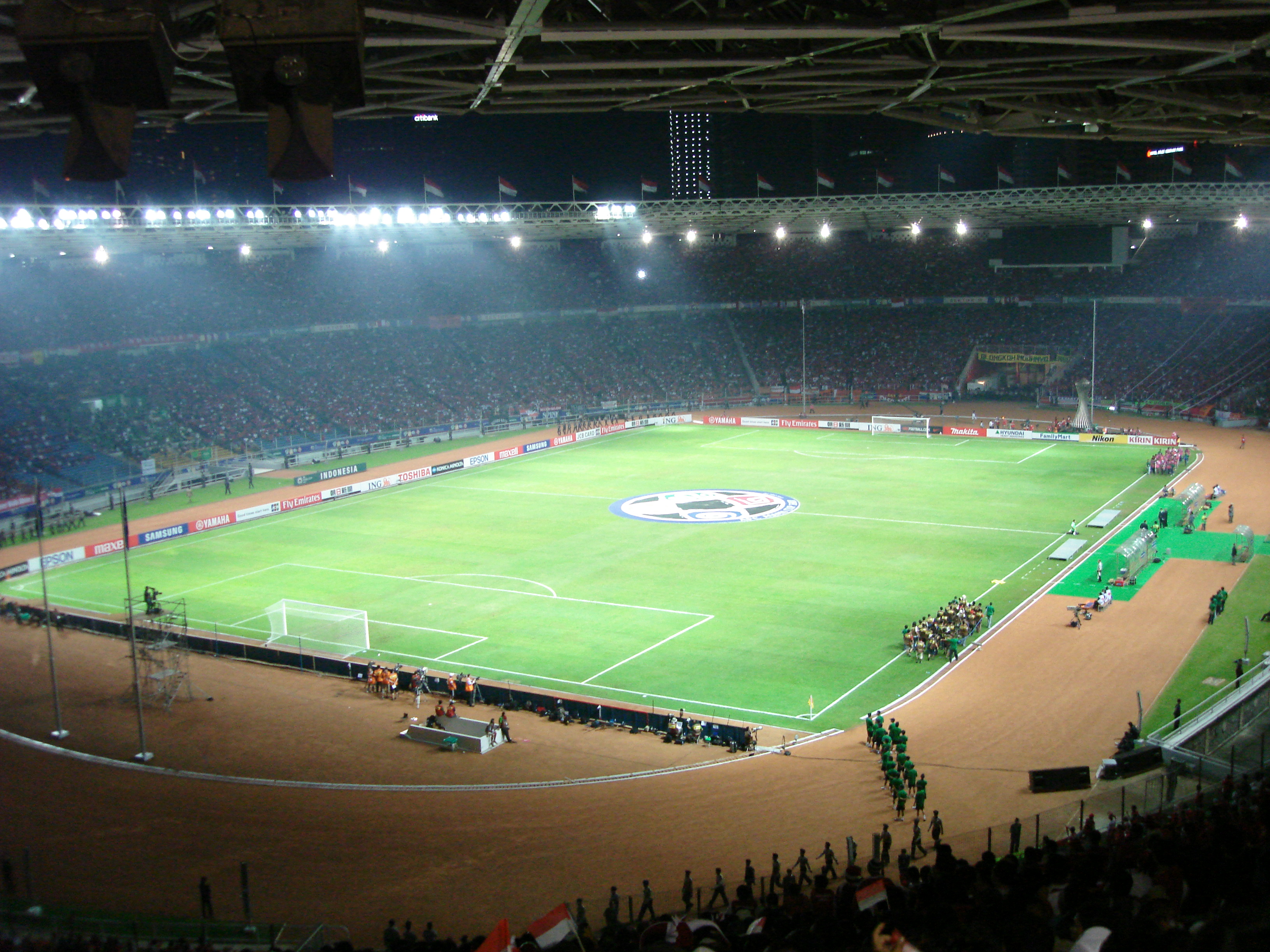
Panorama shot inside the Gelora Bung Karno Stadium during preparation to second match to kick-off of between Saudi Arabia vs Indonesia
14 July 2007
19:30 UTC+7

Saudi Arabia	2–1	Indonesia
Y. Al-Qahtani 12'; Al-Harthi 90'	Report	Elie 17'

Gelora Bung Karno Stadium, Jakarta
Attendance: 87,000
Referee: Ali Al-Badwawi (United Arab Emirates)
15 July 2007
19:30 UTC+7

Bahrain	2–1	South Korea
Isa 43'; Abdullatif 85'	Report	Kim Do-heon 4'

Gelora Bung Karno Stadium, Jakarta
Attendance: 9,000
Referee: Sun Baojie (China)

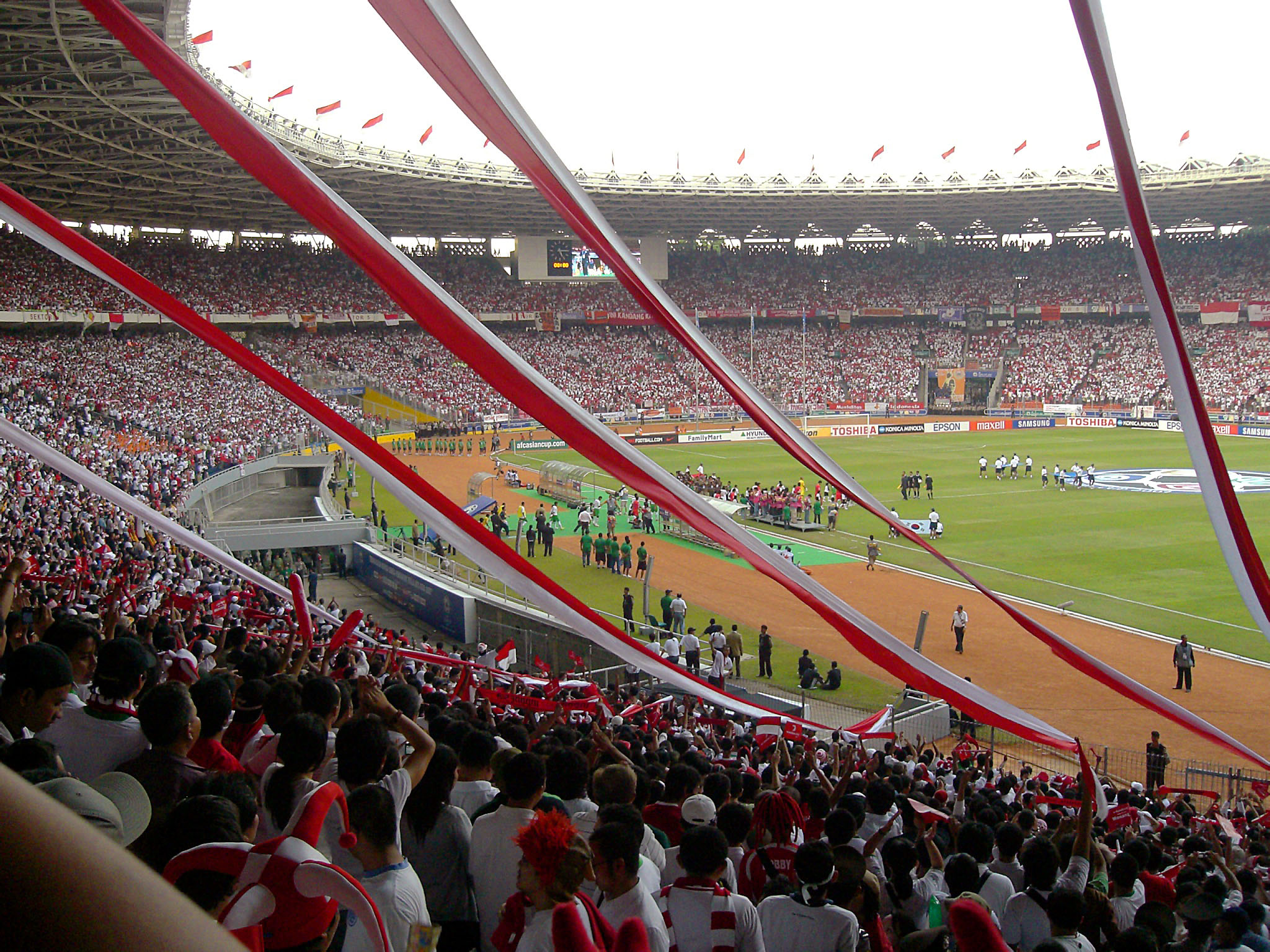
Indonesian supporters flooded Gelora Bung Karno Stadium during last match between Indonesia vs South Korea in 2007 AFC Asian Cup
18 July 2007
17:15 UTC+7

Indonesia	0–1	South Korea
	Report	Kim Jung-woo 34'

Gelora Bung Karno Stadium, Jakarta
Attendance: 88,000
Referee: Mark Shield (Australia)
18 July 2007
17:15 UTC+7

Saudi Arabia	4–0	Bahrain
Al-Mousa 18'; A. Al-Qahtani 45'; Al-Jassim 68', 79'	Report

Gelora Sriwijaya Stadium, Palembang
Attendance: 500
Referee: Yuichi Nishimura (Japan)

== Knockout stage ==
Quarter-finals
21 July – Bangkok
Iraq	2
Vietnam	0
22 July – Kuala Lumpur
Iran	0 (2)
South Korea (pen.)	0 (4)
21 July – Hanoi
Japan (pen.)	1 (4)
Australia	1 (3)
22 July – Jakarta
Saudi Arabia	2
Uzbekistan	1

Semi-finals
25 July – Kuala Lumpur
Iraq (pen.)	0 (4)
South Korea	0 (3)
25 July – Hanoi
Japan	2
Saudi Arabia	3

Final
29 July – Jakarta
Iraq	1
Saudi Arabia	0
Third place
28 July – Palembang
South Korea (pen.)	0 (6)
Japan	0 (5)

=== Quarter-finals ===
21 July 2007
17:15 UTC+7

Japan	1–1 (a.e.t.)	Australia
Takahara 72'	Report	Aloisi 70'
Penalties
Nakamura (penalty scored); Endō (penalty scored); Komano (penalty scored); Takahara (penalty missed); Nakazawa (penalty scored)	4–3	(penalty missed) Kewell; (penalty missed) Neill; (penalty scored) Cahill; (penalty scored) Carle; (penalty scored) Carney

Mỹ Đình Stadium, Hanoi
Attendance: 25,000
Referee: Saad Kamil Al-Fadhli (Kuwait)

21 July 2007
20:15 UTC+7

Iraq	2–0	Vietnam
Mahmoud 2', 65'	Report

Rajamangala Stadium, Bangkok
Attendance: 9,720
Referee: Yuichi Nishimura (Japan)

22 July 2007
18:15 UTC+8

Iran	0–0 (a.e.t.)	South Korea
	Report
Penalties
Zandi (penalty scored); Mahdavikia (penalty missed); Enayati (penalty scored); Khatibi (penalty missed)	2–4	(penalty scored) Lee Chun-soo; (penalty scored) Kim Sang-sik; (penalty missed) Kim Do-heon; (penalty scored) Cho Jae-jin; (penalty scored) Kim Jung-woo

Bukit Jalil Stadium, Kuala Lumpur
Attendance: 8,629
Referee: Ali Al-Badwawi (United Arab Emirates)

22 July 2007
20:15 UTC+7

Saudi Arabia	2–1	Uzbekistan
Y. Al-Qahtani 3'; Al-Mousa 75'	Report	Solomin 82'

Gelora Bung Karno Stadium, Jakarta
Attendance: 12,000
Referee: Kwon Jong-Chul (South Korea)

=== Semi-finals ===
25 July 2007
18:15 UTC+8

Iraq	0–0 (a.e.t.)	South Korea
	Report
Penalties
Hawar (penalty scored); Munir (penalty scored); Abdul-Amir (penalty scored); Mnajed (penalty scored)	4–3	(penalty scored) Lee Chun-soo; (penalty scored) Lee Dong-gook; (penalty scored) Cho Jae-jin; (penalty missed) Yeom Ki-hun; (penalty missed) Kim Jung-woo

Bukit Jalil Stadium, Kuala Lumpur
Attendance: 12,500
Referee: Saad Kamil Al-Fadhli (Kuwait)

25 July 2007
20:15 UTC+7

Japan	2–3	Saudi Arabia
Nakazawa 37'; Abe 53'	Report	Y. Al-Qahtani 35'; Mouath 47', 57'

Mỹ Đình Stadium, Hanoi
Attendance: 10,000
Referee: Matthew Breeze (Australia)

=== Third place play-off ===
28 July 2007
19:30 UTC+7

South Korea	0–0 (a.e.t.)	Japan
	Report
Penalties
Cho Jae-jin (penalty scored); Oh Beom-seok (penalty scored); Lee Chun-soo (penalty scored); Lee Ho (penalty scored); Kim Jin-kyu (penalty scored); Kim Chi-woo (penalty scored)	6–5	(penalty scored) S. Nakamura; (penalty scored) Endō; (penalty scored) Abe; (penalty scored) Komano; (penalty scored) Nakazawa; (penalty missed) Hanyu

Gelora Sriwijaya Stadium, Palembang
Attendance: 10,000
Referee: Ali Al-Badwawi (United Arab Emirates)

=== Final ===
29 July 2007
19:30 UTC+7

Iraq	1–0	Saudi Arabia
Mahmoud 72'	Report

Gelora Bung Karno Stadium, Jakarta
Attendance: 60,000
Referee: Mark Shield (Australia)

== Statistics ==
=== Goalscorers ===
With four goals, Younis Mahmoud, Naohiro Takahara and Yasser Al-Qahtani are the top scorers in the tournament. In total, 84 goals were scored by 57 different players, with two of them credited as own goals.

4 goals

- (Iraq) Younis Mahmoud
- (Japan) Naohiro Takahara
- (Saudi Arabia) Yasser Al-Qahtani

3 goals

- (Australia) Mark Viduka
- (Qatar) Sebastián Soria
- (Uzbekistan) Maksim Shatskikh

2 goals

- (China) Han Peng
- (China) Shao Jiayi
- (China) Wang Dong
- (Iran) Javad Nekounam
- (Japan) Seiichiro Maki
- (Japan) Shunsuke Nakamura
- (Saudi Arabia) Ahmed Al-Mousa
- (Saudi Arabia) Malek Mouath
- (Saudi Arabia) Taisir Al-Jassim
- (Thailand) Pipat Thonkanya
- (United Arab Emirates) Saeed Al Kass
- (Uzbekistan) Timur Kapadze

1 goal

- (Australia) Harry Kewell
- (Australia) John Aloisi
- (Australia) Michael Beauchamp
- (Australia) Tim Cahill
- (Bahrain) Ismail Abdul-Latif
- (Bahrain) Salman Isa
- (Bahrain) Sayed Jalal
- (China) Mao Jianqing
- (Indonesia) Bambang Pamungkas
- (Indonesia) Budi Sudarsono
- (Indonesia) Elie Aiboy
- (Iran) Andranik Teymourian
- (Iran) Ferydoon Zandi
- (Iran) Jalal Hosseini
- (Iran) Javad Kazemian
- (Iraq) Hawar Mulla Mohammed
- (Iraq) Karrar Jassim
- (Iraq) Nashat Akram
- (Japan) Yasuhito Endō
- (Japan) Yuji Nakazawa
- (Japan) Yuki Abe
- (Malaysia) Indra Putra
- (Oman) Badar Al-Maimani
- (Saudi Arabia) Abdulrahman Al-Qahtani
- (Saudi Arabia) Saad Al-Harthi
- (South Korea) Choi Sung-kuk
- (South Korea) Kim Do-heon
- (South Korea) Kim Jung-woo
- (Thailand) Sutee Suksomkit
- (United Arab Emirates) Faisal Khalil
- (Uzbekistan) Alexander Geynrikh
- (Uzbekistan) Aziz Ibragimov
- (Uzbekistan) Pavel Solomin
- (Uzbekistan) Ulugbek Bakayev
- (Vietnam) Huỳnh Quang Thanh
- (Vietnam) Lê Công Vinh
- (Vietnam) Phan Thanh Bình

1 own goal

- (Iran) Rahman Rezaei (against Uzbekistan)
- (Japan) Keita Suzuki (against Vietnam)

=== Awards ===
Most Valuable Player

- (Iraq) Younis Mahmoud

Top scorer

- (Iraq) Younis Mahmoud
- (Saudi Arabia) Yasser Al-Qahtani
- (Japan) Naohiro Takahara

Best Goalkeeper

- (Iraq) Noor Sabri

Best Defender

- (Iraq) Bassim Abbas

Fair Play Award

- Japan

Most Entertaining Team

- Iraq

Team of the tournament

The Toshiba All-Star XI was voted for by fans on the official Asian Cup website.

Goalkeeper	Defenders	Midfielders	Forwards
(South Korea) Lee Woon-jae	(Iraq) Bassim Abbas (Japan) Yuji Nakazawa (Iran) Rahman Rezaei (Australia) Lucas Neill	(Japan) Shunsuke Nakamura (Australia) Harry Kewell (South Korea) Lee Chun-soo (Iraq) Nashat Akram	(Japan) Naohiro Takahara (Saudi Arabia) Yasser Al-Qahtani

=== Final standings ===
Pos.	Team	G	Pld	W	D	L	Pts	GF	GA	GD
1	Iraq	A	6	3	3	0	12	7	2	+5
2	Saudi Arabia	D	6	4	1	1	13	12	6	+6
3	South Korea	D	6	1	4	1	7	3	3	0
4	Japan	B	6	2	3	1	9	11	7	+4
Eliminated in the quarter-finals
5	Iran	C	4	2	2	0	8	6	3	+3
6	Uzbekistan	C	4	2	0	2	6	10	4	+6
7	Australia	A	4	1	2	1	5	7	5	+2
8	Vietnam	B	4	1	1	2	4	4	7	−3
Eliminated in group stage
9	China	C	3	1	1	1	4	7	6	+1
10	Thailand	A	3	1	1	1	4	3	5	−2
11	Indonesia	D	3	1	0	2	3	3	4	−1
12	United Arab Emirates	B	3	1	0	2	3	3	6	−3
13	Bahrain	D	3	1	0	2	3	3	7	−4
14	Qatar	B	3	0	2	1	2	3	4	−1
15	Oman	A	3	0	2	1	2	1	3	−2
16	Malaysia	C	3	0	0	3	0	1	12	−11

== Marketing ==
=== Official match ball ===
The Official Match Ball for the 2007 AFC Asian Cup was launched by Nike on 15 May 2007, making it the first time ever that a ball had been launched specifically for any football competition in Asia. The Nike Mercurial Veloci AC features four blue stripes with gold trim with each host city's name inscribed, as well as the AFC Asian Cup logo.

=== Official song ===
I Believe

Studio album by Tata Young
- Released: 25 February 2004 (Asia)
- Recorded: 2003
- Genres: Pop, dance-pop, R&B
- Length: 41:59 (Standard Edition); 54:48 (Special Limited Edition); 56:53 (Thank You Edition)
- Labels: Sony Music, Columbia
- Producer: Hitvision for Murlyn Music AB

The AFC selected "I Believe", a 2004 single by Thai singer Tata Young as the tournament's official song.

=== Sponsorships ===
Official Sponsors

- Emirates
- Epson
- ING Group
- JCB Co., Ltd.
- Konica Minolta
- Maxell
- Samsung
- The Asahi Shimbun
- Toshiba
- Yamaha Motor Company

Official Supporters

- FamilyMart
- Hyundai Heavy Industries
- Kirin Company
- Makita
- Nike, Inc.
- Nikon
