= 2007 AFC Asian Cup Group A =

Football tournament group stage

Group A of the 2007 AFC Asian Cup was one of four groups of nations competing at the 2007 AFC Asian Cup. The group's first round of matches began on 7 July and its last matches were played on 16 July. All six group matches were played in Bangkok, Thailand. The group consisted of hosts Thailand, Iraq, Australia and Oman.

== Overall ==
Pos	Team	Pld	W	D	L	GF	GA	GD	Pts	Qualification
1	Iraq	3	1	2	0	4	2	+2	5	Advance to knockout stage
2	Australia	3	1	1	1	6	4	+2	4	Advance to knockout stage
3	Thailand (H)	3	1	1	1	3	5	−2	4	
4	Oman	3	0	2	1	1	3	−2	2	

Source: Asian Cup 2007
Rules for classification: Tiebreakers
(H) Hosts

All times are UTC+7.

== Thailand vs Iraq ==
7 July 2007
19:35

Thailand	1–1	Iraq
Sutee 6' (pen.)	Report	Mahmoud 32'

Rajamangala Stadium, Bangkok
Attendance: 30,000
Referee: Kwon Jong-Chul (South Korea)

Thailand	Iraq

GK	18	Kosin Hathairattanakool	(yellow card) 23'
RB	5	Niweat Siriwong
CB	4	Jetsada Jitsawad
CB	12	Nirut Surasiang	(yellow card) 59'
LB	6	Nattaporn Phanrit
CM	9	Therdsak Chaiman		(substituted off) 72'
CM	10	Tawan Sripan (c)
CM	7	Datsakorn Thonglao	(yellow card) 90'
RF	2	Suree Sukha	(yellow card) 76'
CF	13	Kiatisuk Senamuang		(substituted off) 72'
LF	17	Sutee Suksomkit		(substituted off) 86'
Substitutions:
MF	8	Suchao Nuchnum		(substituted on) 72'
FW	14	Teeratep Winothai		(substituted on) 72'
FW	21	Teerasil Dangda		(substituted on) 86'
Manager:
Charnwit Polcheewin

GK	22	Noor Sabri
RB	14	Haidar Abdul-Amir
CB	2	Jassim Ghulam
CB	15	Ali Rehema
LB	3	Bassim Abbas
DM	19	Haitham Kadhim	(yellow card) 51'
RM	18	Mahdi Karim
CM	5	Nashat Akram		(substituted off) 90+1'
CM	6	Salih Sadir		(substituted off) 66'
LM	11	Hawar Mulla Mohammed
CF	10	Younis Mahmoud (c)
Substitutions:
MF	24	Qusay Munir		(substituted on) 66'
MF	13	Karrar Jassim		(substituted on) 90+1'
Manager:
(Brazil) Jorvan Vieira

Man of the Match
Sutee Suksomkit (Thailand)

Assistant referees:
Awni Hassouneh (Jordan)
Jeong Hae-Sang (South Korea)
Fourth official:
Jasim Karim (Bahrain)

== Australia vs Oman ==
8 July 2007
17:20

Australia	1–1	Oman
Cahill 90+2'	Report	Al-Maimani 32'

Rajamangala Stadium, Bangkok
Attendance: 5,000
Referee: Eddy Maillet (Seychelles)

Australia	Oman

GK	1	Mark Schwarzer
RB	7	Brett Emerton	(yellow card) 18'
CB	3	Patrick Kisnorbo		(substituted off) 78'
CB	2	Lucas Neill
LB	21	Mile Sterjovski		(substituted off) 46'
CM	23	Mark Bresciano
CM	13	Vince Grella		(substituted off) 62'
CM	5	Jason Culina
RF	8	Luke Wilkshire
CF	9	Mark Viduka (c)
LF	10	Harry Kewell
Substitutions:
FW	15	John Aloisi		(substituted on) 46'
MF	4	Tim Cahill	(yellow card) 89'	(substituted on) 62'
MF	14	Brett Holman		(substituted on) 78'
Manager:
Graham Arnold

GK	26	Ali Al-Habsi
RB	3	Juma Al-Wahaibi	(yellow card) 55'
CB	2	Mohammed Rabia (c)	(yellow card) 33'
CB	4	Said Al-Shoon
LB	17	Hassan Mudhafar
RM	11	Yousuf Shaaban	(yellow card) 52'	(substituted off) 65'
CM	12	Ahmed Kano	(yellow card) 21'
LM	15	Ismail Al-Ajmi
AM	8	Badar Al-Maimani		(substituted off) 60'
AM	21	Ahmed Hadid
CF	20	Amad Al-Hosni		(substituted off) 80'
Substitutions:
MF	10	Fawzi Bashir		(substituted on) 60'
FW	13	Mohammed Al-Ghassani		(substituted on) 65'
MF	24	Younis Mubarak		(substituted on) 80'
Manager:
(Argentina) Gabriel Calderón

Man of the Match
Luke Wilkshire (Australia)

Assistant referees:
Celestin Ntagungira (Rwanda)
Evarist Menkouande (Cameroon)
Fourth official:
Lee Gi-Young (South Korea)

== Oman vs Thailand ==
12 July 2007
17:20

Oman	0–2	Thailand
	Report	Pipat 70', 78'

Rajamangala Stadium, Bangkok
Attendance: 19,000
Referee: Lee Gi-Young (South Korea)

Oman	Thailand

GK	26	Ali Al-Habsi
RB	3	Juma Al-Wahaibi	(yellow card) 43'
CB	2	Mohammed Rabia (c)
CB	4	Said Al-Shoon	(yellow card) 35'
LB	17	Hassan Mudhafar	(yellow card) 24'
CM	8	Badar Al-Maimani		(substituted off) 78'
CM	12	Ahmed Kano
CM	21	Ahmed Hadid
AM	10	Fawzi Bashir
CF	20	Amad Al-Hosni	(yellow card) 28'
CF	15	Ismail Al-Ajmi
Substitutions:
FW	14	Younis Al-Mushaifri		(substituted on) 78'
Manager:
(Argentina) Gabriel Calderón

GK	18	Kosin Hathairattanakool
RB	5	Niweat Siriwong
CB	16	Kiatprawut Saiwaeo
CB	12	Nirut Surasiang
LB	6	Nattaporn Phanrit
CM	9	Therdsak Chaiman		(substituted off) 58'
CM	10	Tawan Sripan (c)
CM	7	Datsakorn Thonglao
RF	2	Suree Sukha
CF	13	Kiatisuk Senamuang		(substituted off) 67'
LF	17	Sutee Suksomkit		(substituted off) 73'
Substitutions:
FW	23	Pipat Thonkanya		(substituted on) 58'
FW	14	Teeratep Winothai		(substituted on) 67'
MF	8	Suchao Nuchnum	(yellow card) 83'	(substituted on) 73'
Manager:
Charnwit Polcheewin

Man of the Match
Pipat Thonkanya (Thailand)

Assistant referees:
Tang Yew Mun (Singapore)
Celestin Ntagungira (Rwanda)
Fourth official:
Eddy Maillet (Seychelles)

== Iraq vs Australia ==
13 July 2007
17:20

Iraq	3–1	Australia
Akram 22'; Hawar 60'; Jassim 86'	Report	Viduka 47'

Rajamangala Stadium, Bangkok
Attendance: 6,000
Referee: Jasim Karim (Bahrain)

Iraq	Australia

GK	22	Noor Sabri
RB	14	Haidar Abdul-Amir
CB	2	Jassim Ghulam
CB	15	Ali Rehema
LB	3	Bassim Abbas
DM	19	Haitham Kadhim	(yellow card) 62'	(substituted off) 74'
RM	18	Mahdi Karim
CM	5	Nashat Akram
CM	6	Salih Sadir		(substituted off) 49'
LM	11	Hawar Mulla Mohammed
CF	10	Younis Mahmoud (c)		(substituted off) 90+1'
Substitutions:
MF	24	Qusay Munir	(yellow card) 81'	(substituted on) 49'
MF	13	Karrar Jassim		(substituted on) 74'
FW	9	Nasser Shakroun		(substituted on) 90+1'
Manager:
(Brazil) Jorvan Vieira

GK	1	Mark Schwarzer
RB	7	Brett Emerton
CB	3	Patrick Kisnorbo		(substituted off) 71'
CB	2	Lucas Neill	(yellow card) 42' (yellow-red card) 90+3'
LB	8	Luke Wilkshire	(yellow card) 89'
CM	23	Mark Bresciano
CM	13	Vince Grella	(yellow card) 35'
CM	5	Jason Culina	(yellow card) 12'	(substituted off) 64'
RF	14	Brett Holman		(substituted off) 46'
CF	9	Mark Viduka (c)
LF	10	Harry Kewell
Substitutions:
MF	4	Tim Cahill		(substituted on) 46'
FW	15	John Aloisi		(substituted on) 64'
FW	11	Archie Thompson		(substituted on) 71'
Manager:
Graham Arnold

Man of the Match
Nashat Akram (Iraq)

Assistant referees:
Awni Hassouneh (Jordan)
Jeong Hae-Sang (South Korea)
Fourth official:
Kwon Jong-Chul (South Korea)

== Thailand vs Australia ==
16 July 2007
19:35

Thailand	0–4	Australia
	Report	Beauchamp 21'; Viduka 80', 83'; Kewell 90'

Rajamangala Stadium, Bangkok
Attendance: 46,000
Referee: Kwon Jong-Chul (South Korea)

Thailand	Australia

GK	18	Kosin Hathairattanakool
RB	5	Niweat Siriwong
CB	16	Kiatprawut Saiwaeo		(substituted off) 56'
CB	12	Nirut Surasiang	(yellow card) 47'
LB	6	Nattaporn Phanrit
CM	2	Suree Sukha
CM	8	Suchao Nuchnum
CM	17	Sutee Suksomkit		(substituted off) 54'
AM	10	Tawan Sripan (c)
CF	14	Teeratep Winothai		(substituted off) 60'
CF	13	Kiatisuk Senamuang
Substitutions:
MF	7	Datsakorn Thonglao	(yellow card) 73'	(substituted on) 54'
DF	4	Jetsada Jitsawad		(substituted on) 56'
FW	23	Pipat Thonkanya		(substituted on) 60'
Manager:
Charnwit Polcheewin

GK	1	Mark Schwarzer
RB	7	Brett Emerton
CB	22	Mark Milligan
CB	6	Michael Beauchamp
LB	20	David Carney
CM	23	Mark Bresciano		(substituted off) 74'
CM	13	Vince Grella
CM	5	Jason Culina
RF	8	Luke Wilkshire	(yellow card) 84'
CF	9	Mark Viduka (c)		(substituted off) 84'
LF	15	John Aloisi	(yellow card) 28'	(substituted off) 61'
Substitutions:
FW	10	Harry Kewell		(substituted on) 61'
MF	4	Tim Cahill		(substituted on) 74'
MF	14	Brett Holman		(substituted on) 84'
Manager:
Graham Arnold

Man of the Match
Mark Viduka (Australia)

Assistant referees:
Jeong Hae-Sang (South Korea)
Tang Yew Mun (Singapore)
Fourth official:
Lee Gi-Young (South Korea)

== Oman vs Iraq ==
16 July 2007
19:35

Oman	0–0	Iraq
	Report

Supachalasai Stadium, Bangkok
Attendance: 500
Referee: Eddy Maillet (Seychelles)

Oman	Iraq

GK	26	Ali Al-Habsi
RB	12	Ahmed Kano	(yellow card) 90+2'
CB	2	Mohammed Rabia (c)
CB	6	Issam Fayel
LB	17	Hassan Mudhafar
CM	8	Badar Al-Maimani
CM	10	Fawzi Bashir		(substituted off) 69'
CM	21	Ahmed Hadid		(substituted off) 81'
RF	11	Yousuf Shaaban
CF	20	Amad Al-Hosni	(yellow card) 45'
LF	15	Ismail Al-Ajmi		(substituted off) 67'
Substitutions:
FW	14	Younis Al-Mushaifri		(substituted on) 67'
FW	28	Hussain Al-Hadhri		(substituted on) 69'
MF	24	Younis Mubarak		(substituted on) 81'
Manager:
(Argentina) Gabriel Calderón

GK	22	Noor Sabri
RB	4	Khaldoun Ibrahim
CB	2	Jassim Ghulam
CB	15	Ali Rehema
LB	3	Bassim Abbas
CM	24	Qusay Munir	(yellow card) 73'
CM	8	Ahmad Abid Ali		(substituted off) 71'
RW	18	Mahdi Karim
AM	6	Salih Sadir
LW	11	Hawar Mulla Mohammed		(substituted off) 46'
CF	10	Younis Mahmoud (c)
Substitutions:
MF	13	Karrar Jassim		(substituted on) 46'
FW	7	Ali Abbas	(yellow card) 76'	(substituted on) 71'
Manager:
(Brazil) Jorvan Vieira

Man of the Match
Mahdi Karim (Iraq)

Assistant referees:
Ntagungira Celestin (Rwanda)
Menkouande Evarist (Cameroon)
Fourth official:
Jasim Karim (Bahrain)
