= Oman at the AFC Asian Cup =

National football delegation

Oman has participated in five AFC Asian Cups, in 2004, 2007, 2015, 2019 and 2023.

Prior to the 21st century, Oman generally struggled to qualify for the Asian Cup, having been considered as a much weaker side. It was the rise of Oman's national under-17 team that saw them have more opportunities to play on the international stage. Eventually, Oman qualified for their first Asian Cup in 2004, before managing to do so again in 2007, 2015, 2019 and 2023. Oman went out in the group stage in their first three participations, but in 2019 they set a new historical milestone by qualifying for the knockout stage for the first time in their history.

== Overall results ==
AFC Asian Cup record									Qualification record					
Year	Result	Position	Pld	W	D*	L	GF	GA	Pld	W	D*	L	GF	GA
(Hong Kong) 1956 to (Kuwait) 1980	Did not enter								Did not enter					
(Singapore) 1984	Did not qualify								4	1	1	2	9	15
(Qatar) 1988	Withdrew								Withdrew					
(Japan) 1992	Did not qualify								2	0	0	2	0	5
(United Arab Emirates) 1996	Did not qualify								6	4	0	2	23	5
(Lebanon) 2000	Did not qualify								3	1	0	2	4	4
(China) 2004	Group stage	9th	3	1	1	1	4	3	6	5	0	1	24	2
(Indonesia) (Malaysia) (Thailand) (Vietnam) 2007	Group stage	15th	3	0	2	1	1	3	6	4	0	2	14	6
(Qatar) 2011	Did not qualify								6	2	2	2	4	4
(Australia) 2015	Group stage	12th	3	1	0	2	1	5	6	4	2	0	7	1
(United Arab Emirates) 2019	Round of 16	16th	4	1	0	3	4	6	14	9	2	3	39	12
(Qatar) 2023	Group stage	17th	3	0	2	1	2	3	8	6	0	2	16	6
(Saudi Arabia) 2027	Qualified								6	4	1	1	11	2
Total	Best: Round of 16	6/19	16	3	5	8	12	20	67	40	8	19	151	62

== 2004 Asian Cup ==
2004 Asian Cup was Oman's first ever participation in continental stage. In here, debutant Oman was placed with Iran, Japan and Thailand. In spite of being considered as a basket point, Oman, however, demonstrated its football feat, and only ended in the group stage with a minor loss to defending champions Japan and a surprising draw to Iran.

=== Group D ===
Team	Pts	Pld	W	D	L	GF	GA	GD
Japan	7	3	2	1	0	5	1	+4
Iran	5	3	1	2	0	5	2	+3
Oman	4	3	1	1	1	4	3	+1
Thailand	0	3	0	0	3	1	9	−8

20 July 2004
18:00

Japan	1–0	Oman
Nakamura 33'	Report

Chongqing Olympic Sports Center, Chongqing
Attendance: 35,000
Referee: Mark Shield (Australia)

24 July 2004
18:00

Oman	2–2	Iran
Al-Hosni 31', 40'	Report	Karimi 61'; Nosrati 90+4'

Chongqing Olympic Sports Center, Chongqing
Attendance: 35,000
Referee: Abdul Rahman Al-Delawar (Bahrain)

28 July 2004
18:15

Oman	2–0	Thailand
Viwatchaichok 15' (o.g.); Al-Hosni 49'	Report

Sichuan Longquanyi Stadium, Chengdu
Attendance: 13,000
Referee: Lu Jun (China)

== 2007 Asian Cup ==
Oman qualified for the second consecutive Asian Cup, this time, to meet up again with Thailand, Gulf rival Iraq and debutant Australia. Oman nonetheless impressed by making a stunning 1–1 draw to giant Australia; but a humiliating defeat to host Thailand and another draw with Iraq saw Oman crashed out from group stage for the second times.

=== Group A ===
Team	Pld	W	D	L	GF	GA	GD	Pts
Iraq	3	1	2	0	4	2	+2	5
Australia	3	1	1	1	6	4	+2	4
Thailand	3	1	1	1	3	5	−2	4
Oman	3	0	2	1	1	3	−2	2

8 July 2007
17:15 UTC+7

Australia	1–1	Oman
Cahill 90+2'	Report	Al-Maimani 32'

Rajamangala Stadium, Bangkok
Attendance: 5,000
Referee: Eddy Maillet (Seychelles)

12 July 2007
17:15 UTC+7

Oman	0–2	Thailand
	Report	Thonkanya 70', 78'

Rajamangala Stadium, Bangkok
Attendance: 19,000
Referee: Lee Gi-Young (South Korea)

16 July 2007
19:30 UTC+7

Oman	0–0	Iraq
	Report

National Stadium, Bangkok
Attendance: 500
Referee: Eddy Maillet (Seychelles)

== 2015 Asian Cup ==
Oman would make their third appearance in the tournament, in 2015. Same like 2007, they were placed in Group A again, with Australia, Kuwait and South Korea on board. Oman could not repeat the feat they did to South Korea and Australia before, when Oman lost two opening matches, and crashed out again. A late victory over Kuwait was too little, too late.

=== Group A ===
Pos	Team	Pld	W	D	L	GF	GA	GD	Pts	Qualification
1	South Korea	3	3	0	0	3	0	+3	9	Advance to knockout stage
2	Australia (H)	3	2	0	1	8	2	+6	6	Advance to knockout stage
3	Oman	3	1	0	2	1	5	−4	3	
4	Kuwait	3	0	0	3	1	6	−5	0	

Source: Asian Cup Australia 2015
Rules for classification: Tiebreakers
(H) Hosts

10 January 2015
South Korea	1–0	Oman	Canberra Stadium, Canberra
13 January 2015
Oman	0–4	Australia	Stadium Australia, Sydney
17 January 2015
Oman	1–0	Kuwait	Newcastle Stadium, Newcastle

== 2019 Asian Cup ==
Oman was placed in a group including Uzbekistan, Turkmenistan and Japan, the latter of which is Asia's powerhouse. Oman opened their tournament with a 1–2 defeat to Uzbekistan, a match in which Oman played well but scored a controversial goal that should have been judged offside. Oman suffered its second defeat to Japan 0–1 due to a controversial penalty, forcing Oman to win against Turkmenistan to qualify to the knockout stage. Eventually, Oman beat Turkmenistan 3–1 to qualify for the first time, and this was seen as a success for Omani football. In their first knockout match of Oman's history however, they lost 0–2 to Iran and were eliminated from the tournament.

=== Group F ===
Pos	Team	Pld	W	D	L	GF	GA	GD	Pts	Qualification
1	Japan	3	3	0	0	6	3	+3	9	Advance to knockout stage
2	Uzbekistan	3	2	0	1	7	3	+4	6	Advance to knockout stage
3	Oman	3	1	0	2	4	4	0	3	Advance to knockout stage
4	Turkmenistan	3	0	0	3	3	10	−7	0	

Source: AFC
9 January 2019
17:30

Uzbekistan	2–1	Oman
Ahmedov 34'; Shomurodov 85'	Report	Mu. Al-Ghassani 72'

Sharjah Stadium, Sharjah
Attendance: 9,424
Referee: Ko Hyung-jin (South Korea)

13 January 2019
17:30

Oman	0–1	Japan
	Report	Haraguchi 28' (pen.)

Zayed Sports City Stadium, Abu Dhabi
Attendance: 12,110
Referee: Mohd Amirul Izwan Yaacob (Malaysia)

17 January 2019
17:30

Oman	3–1	Turkmenistan
Al-Mahaijri 20'; Mu. Al-Ghassani 84'; Al-Musalami 90+3'	Report	Annadurdyýew 41'

Mohammed bin Zayed Stadium, Abu Dhabi
Attendance: 8,338
Referee: Nawaf Shukralla (Bahrain)

=== Knockout stage ===
Round of 16

20 January 2019
21:00

Iran	2–0	Oman
Jahanbakhsh 32'; Dejagah 41' (pen.)	Report

Mohammed bin Zayed Stadium, Abu Dhabi
Attendance: 31,945
Referee: César Ramos (Mexico)

== 2023 Asian Cup ==
Oman were placed in Group F with Saudi Arabia, Thailand, and Kyrgyzstan. In the first match against Saudi Arabia, Oman took the lead in the 14th minute. However, they ended up losing with a stoppage time winner. In their second game, they played out a 0-0 with Thailand. In their last game, Oman took the lead early against Kyrgyzstan but could not hold on as the opposition equalized and therefore knocked Oman out of the competition.

=== Group F ===
Pos	Team	Pld	W	D	L	GF	GA	GD	Pts	Qualification
1	Saudi Arabia	3	2	1	0	4	1	+3	7	Advance to knockout stage
2	Thailand	3	1	2	0	2	0	+2	5	Advance to knockout stage
3	Oman	3	0	2	1	2	3	−1	2	
4	Kyrgyzstan	3	0	1	2	1	5	−4	1	

Source: AFC
16 January 2024
20:30

Saudi Arabia	2–1	Oman
Ghareeb 78'; Al-Bulaihi 90+6'	Report	Al-Yahyaei 14' (pen.)

Khalifa International Stadium, Al Rayyan
Attendance: 41,987
Referee: Shaun Evans (Australia)

21 January 2024
17:30

Oman	0–0	Thailand
	Report

Abdullah bin Khalifa Stadium, Doha
Attendance: 6,340
Referee: Mooud Bonyadifard (Iran)

25 January 2024
18:00

Kyrgyzstan	1–1	Oman
Kojo 80'	Report	Al-Ghassani 8'

Abdullah bin Khalifa Stadium, Doha
Attendance: 6,231
Referee: Ahmad Al-Ali (Kuwait)

Ranking of third-placed teams

Pos	Grp	Team	Pld	W	D	L	GF	GA	GD	Pts	Qualification
1	E	Jordan	3	1	1	1	6	3	+3	4	Advance to knockout stage
2	C	Palestine	3	1	1	1	5	5	0	4	Advance to knockout stage
3	B	Syria	3	1	1	1	1	1	0	4	Advance to knockout stage
4	D	Indonesia	3	1	0	2	3	6	−3	3	Advance to knockout stage
5	F	Oman	3	0	2	1	2	3	−1	2	
6	A	China	3	0	2	1	0	1	−1	2	

Source: AFC
