= Thailand at the AFC Asian Cup =

The Thailand's representative senior football team has participated in 8 editions of the AFC Asian Cup.

== Overviewing table ==
| AFC Asian Cup finals record | | | | | | | | | | Qualifications record | | | | | |
| Year | Host country | Result | Position | GP | W | D* | L | GS | GA | GP | W | D* | L | GS | GA |
|---|---|---|---|---|---|---|---|---|---|---|---|---|---|---|---|
| 1956 | Hong Kong | Withdrew | | | | | | | | Withdrew | | | | | |
| 1960 | South Korea | Withdrew | | | | | | | | Withdrew | | | | | |
| 1964 | Israel | Did not qualify | | | | | | | | 4 | 2 | 0 | 2 | 5 | 4 |
| 1968 | Iran | Did not qualify | | | | | | | | 4 | 2 | 0 | 2 | 5 | 4 |
| 1972 | Thailand | Third place | 3rd | 5 | 0 | 3 | 2 | 6 | 9 | 5 | 3 | 1 | 1 | 16 | 4 |
| 1976 | Iran | Withdrew after qualified | | | | | | | | 4 | 3 | 0 | 1 | 8 | 2 |
| 1980 | Kuwait | Did not qualify | | | | | | | | 5 | 3 | 0 | 2 | 11 | 3 |
| 1984 | Singapore | Did not qualify | | | | | | | | 5 | 3 | 0 | 2 | 9 | 10 |
| 1988 | Qatar | Did not qualify | | | | | | | | 5 | 1 | 2 | 2 | 5 | 12 |
| 1992 | Japan | First round | 7th | 3 | 0 | 2 | 1 | 1 | 5 | 2 | 2 | 0 | 0 | 3 | 1 |
| 1996 | United Arab Emirates | First round | 12th | 3 | 0 | 0 | 3 | 2 | 13 | 6 | 4 | 2 | 0 | 31 | 5 |
| 2000 | Lebanon | First round | 9th | 3 | 0 | 2 | 1 | 2 | 4 | 6 | 4 | 1 | 1 | 13 | 8 |
| 2004 | China | First round | 16th | 3 | 0 | 0 | 3 | 1 | 9 | 6 | 3 | 0 | 3 | 10 | 7 |
| 2007 | Indonesia; Malaysia; Thailand; Vietnam | First round | 10th | 3 | 1 | 1 | 1 | 3 | 5 | Qualified as co-host | | | | | |
| 2011 | Qatar | Did not qualify | | | | | | | | 6 | 1 | 3 | 2 | 3 | 3 |
| 2015 | Australia | Did not qualify | | | | | | | | 6 | 0 | 0 | 6 | 7 | 21 |
| 2019 | United Arab Emirates | Round of 16 | 14th | 4 | 1 | 1 | 2 | 4 | 7 | 6 | 4 | 2 | 0 | 14 | 6 |
| 2023 | Qatar | Round of 16 | 13th | 4 | 1 | 2 | 1 | 3 | 2 | 11 | 4 | 3 | 4 | 14 | 11 |
| Total | | 8/18 | Best: 3rd | 28 | 3 | 11 | 14 | 22 | 54 | 79 | 36 | 15 | 28 | 150 | 107 |

Note

- * : Denotes draws including knockout matches decided on penalty kicks.

== 1972 AFC Asian Cup ==
=== Group allocation match ===
8 May 1972

| Thailand | 0–2 | Kuwait |
|---|---|---|
| | | Khalaf 42'; Marzouq 87' |

National Stadium, Bangkok

=== Group A ===
| Team | Pld | W | D | L | GF | GA | GD | Pts |
|---|---|---|---|---|---|---|---|---|
| Iran | 2 | 2 | 0 | 0 | 6 | 2 | +4 | 4 |
| Thailand | 2 | 0 | 1 | 1 | 3 | 4 | −1 | 1 |
| Iraq | 2 | 0 | 1 | 1 | 1 | 4 | −3 | 1 |

11 May 1972

| Thailand | 1–1 | Iraq |
|---|---|---|
| Supakit 57' | | Yousif 6' |

National Stadium, Bangkok

13 May 1972

| Thailand | 2–3 | Iran |
|---|---|---|
| Prapon 69', 70' | | Jabbari 80', 86', 88' |

National Stadium, Bangkok
Attendance: 25,000
Referee: Matolzi (Malaysia)

=== Semi-finals ===
17 May 1972

| South Korea | 1–1 (a.e.t.) | Thailand |
|---|---|---|
| Park Lee-Chun 115' | | Prapon 98' |
Penalties
| | 2–1 |

National Stadium, Bangkok

=== Third place ===
19 May 1972

| Khmer Republic | 2–2 (a.e.t.) | Thailand |
Penalties
| | 3–5 |

National Stadium, Bangkok

== 1992 AFC Asian Cup ==
=== Group B ===
| Team | Pts | Pld | W | D | L | GF | GA | GD |
|---|---|---|---|---|---|---|---|---|
| Saudi Arabia | 5 | 3 | 1 | 2 | 0 | 6 | 2 | +4 |
| China | 5 | 3 | 1 | 2 | 0 | 3 | 2 | +1 |
| Qatar | 2 | 3 | 0 | 2 | 1 | 3 | 4 | −1 |
| Thailand | 2 | 3 | 0 | 2 | 1 | 1 | 5 | −4 |

29 October 1992
19:00

| Thailand | 1–1 | Qatar |
|---|---|---|
| Thanis 42' | Report | Soufi 81' |

Hiroshima Big Arch, Hiroshima
Attendance: 21,000
Referee: Hossein Khoshkhan (Iran)

31 October 1992
15:00

| China | 0–0 | Thailand |
|---|---|---|
| | Report |

Hiroshima Stadium, Hiroshima
Attendance: 5,000
Referee: Noh Byung-Il (Korea Republic)

2 November 1992
17:00

| Saudi Arabia | 4–0 | Thailand |
|---|---|---|
| Al-Owairan 4'; Al-Bishi 19', 72'; Al-Thunayan 64' | Report |

Bingo Sports Park, Onomichi
Attendance: 4,000
Referee: Ali Bujsaim (United Arab Emirates)

== 1996 AFC Asian Cup ==
=== Group B ===
| Team | Pts | Pld | W | D | L | GF | GA | GD |
|---|---|---|---|---|---|---|---|---|
| Iran | 6 | 3 | 2 | 0 | 1 | 7 | 3 | +4 |
| Saudi Arabia | 6 | 3 | 2 | 0 | 1 | 7 | 3 | +4 |
| Iraq | 6 | 3 | 2 | 0 | 1 | 6 | 3 | +3 |
| Thailand | 0 | 3 | 0 | 0 | 3 | 2 | 13 | −11 |

5 December 1996
16:45

| Saudi Arabia | 6–0 | Thailand |
|---|---|---|
| Al-Temawi 10' (pen.), 29' (pen.); Al-Mehallel 15', 54'; Al-Muwallid 18'; Al-Jaber 52' | Report |

Al-Maktoum Stadium, Dubai
Attendance: 5,000
Referee: Gamal Al-Ghandour (Egypt)

8 December 1996
19:00

| Thailand | 1–3 | Iran |
|---|---|---|
| Kiatisuk 80' | Report | Saadavi 38'; Minavand 54'; Daei 70' |

Al-Maktoum Stadium, Dubai
Attendance: 12,000
Referee: Lu Jun (China)

11 December 1996
19:00

| Iraq | 4–1 | Thailand |
|---|---|---|
| Mahmoud 17', 50'; Hussein 23', 63' | Report | Dusit 26' |

Al-Maktoum Stadium, Dubai
Attendance: 3,000
Referee: Kim Young-Joo (Korea Republic)

== 2000 AFC Asian Cup ==
=== Group A ===
| Team | Pts | Pld | W | D | L | GF | GA | GD |
|---|---|---|---|---|---|---|---|---|
| Iran | 7 | 3 | 2 | 1 | 0 | 6 | 1 | +5 |
| Iraq | 4 | 3 | 1 | 1 | 1 | 4 | 3 | +1 |
| Thailand | 2 | 3 | 0 | 2 | 1 | 2 | 4 | −2 |
| Lebanon | 2 | 3 | 0 | 2 | 1 | 3 | 7 | −4 |

12 October 2000
15:00

| Iraq | 2–0 | Thailand |
|---|---|---|
| Chathir 27'; Mahmoud 60' | Report |

Saida Municipal Stadium, Sidon
Attendance: 2,500
Referee: Toru Kamikawa (Japan)

15 October 2000
17:00

| Iran | 1–1 | Thailand |
|---|---|---|
| Daei 73' | Report | Sakesan 12' |

Sports City Stadium, Beirut
Attendance: 10,000
Referee: Saad Kamil Al-Fadhli (Kuwait)

18 October 2000
19:30

| Lebanon | 1–1 | Thailand |
|---|---|---|
| Fernandes 83' | Report | Sakesan 58' |

Camille Chamoun Sports City Stadium, Beirut
Attendance: 50,000
Referee: Lu Jun (China)

== 2004 AFC Asian Cup ==
=== Group D ===
| Team | Pts | Pld | W | D | L | GF | GA | GD |
|---|---|---|---|---|---|---|---|---|
| Japan | 7 | 3 | 2 | 1 | 0 | 5 | 1 | +4 |
| Iran | 5 | 3 | 1 | 2 | 0 | 5 | 2 | +3 |
| Oman | 4 | 3 | 1 | 1 | 1 | 4 | 3 | +1 |
| Thailand | 0 | 3 | 0 | 0 | 3 | 1 | 9 | −8 |

20 July 2004
20:30

| Iran | 3–0 | Thailand |
|---|---|---|
| Enayati 71'; Nekounam 80'; Daei 86' (pen.) | Report |

Chongqing Olympic Sports Center, Chongqing
Attendance: 37,000
Referee: Mohammad Kousa (Syria)

24 July 2004
20:30

| Thailand | 1–4 | Japan |
|---|---|---|
| Sutee 12' | Report | Nakamura 21'; Nakazawa 57', 87'; Fukunishi 68' |

Chongqing Olympic Sports Center, Chongqing
Referee: Fareed Al-Marzouqi (United Arab Emirates)

28 July 2004
18:15

| Oman | 2–0 | Thailand |
|---|---|---|
| Rangsan 15' (o.g.); Al-Hosni 49' | Report |

Sichuan Longquanyi Stadium, Chengdu
Attendance: 13,000
Referee: Lu Jun (China)

== 2007 AFC Asian Cup ==
=== Group A ===
| Team | Pld | W | D | L | GF | GA | GD | Pts |
|---|---|---|---|---|---|---|---|---|
| Iraq | 3 | 1 | 2 | 0 | 4 | 2 | +2 | 5 |
| Australia | 3 | 1 | 1 | 1 | 6 | 4 | +2 | 4 |
| Thailand | 3 | 1 | 1 | 1 | 3 | 5 | −2 | 4 |
| Oman | 3 | 0 | 2 | 1 | 1 | 3 | −2 | 2 |

7 July 2007
19:30 UTC+7

| Thailand | 1–1 | Iraq |
|---|---|---|
| Sutee 6' (pen.) | Report | Mahmoud 32' |

Rajamangala Stadium, Bangkok
Attendance: 30,000
Referee: Kwon Jong-Chul (South Korea)

12 July 2007
17:15 UTC+7

| Oman | 0–2 | Thailand |
|---|---|---|
| | Report | Pipat 70', 78' |

Rajamangala Stadium, Bangkok
Attendance: 19,000
Referee: Lee Gi-Young (South Korea)

16 July 2007
19:30 UTC+7

| Thailand | 0–4 | Australia |
|---|---|---|
| | Report | Beauchamp 21'; Viduka 80', 83'; Kewell 90' |

Rajamangala Stadium, Bangkok
Attendance: 46,000
Referee: Kwon Jong-Chul (South Korea)

== 2019 AFC Asian Cup ==
Thailand returned to the tournament after being absence in 2011 and 2015. They were drawn in Pot 2.

=== Group A ===
| Pos | Team | Pld | W | D | L | GF | GA | GD | Pts | Qualification |
|---|---|---|---|---|---|---|---|---|---|---|
| 1 | United Arab Emirates (H) | 3 | 1 | 2 | 0 | 4 | 2 | +2 | 5 | Advance to knockout stage |
| 2 | Thailand | 3 | 1 | 1 | 1 | 3 | 5 | −2 | 4 (Note: Head-to-head points: Thailand 3, Bahrain 0.) | Advance to knockout stage |
| 3 | Bahrain | 3 | 1 | 1 | 1 | 2 | 2 | 0 | 4 | Advance to knockout stage |
| 4 | India | 3 | 1 | 0 | 2 | 4 | 4 | 0 | 3 | |

Source: AFC
(H) Hosts
Notes:
6 January 2019
17:30

| Thailand | 1–4 | India |
|---|---|---|
| Teerasil 33' | Report | Chhetri 27' (pen.), 46'; Thapa 68'; Lalpekhlua 80' |

Al Nahyan Stadium, Abu Dhabi
Attendance: 3,250
Referee: Liu Kwok Man (Hong Kong)

10 January 2019
15:00

| Bahrain | 0–1 | Thailand |
|---|---|---|
| | Report | Chanathip 58' |

Al Maktoum Stadium, Dubai
Attendance: 2,720
Referee: Chris Beath (Australia)

14 January 2019
20:00

| United Arab Emirates | 1–1 | Thailand |
|---|---|---|
| Mabkhout 7' | Report | Thitipan 41' |

Hazza bin Zayed Stadium, Al Ain
Attendance: 17,809
Referee: Ryuji Sato (Japan)

=== Knockout stage ===
==== Round of 16 ====
20 January 2019
18:00

| Thailand | 1–2 | China |
|---|---|---|
| Supachai 31' | Report | Xiao Zhi 67'; Gao Lin 71' (pen.) |

Hazza bin Zayed Stadium, Al Ain
Attendance: 8,026
Referee: Mohammed Abdulla Hassan Mohamed (United Arab Emirates)

== 2023 AFC Asian Cup ==
=== Group F ===
| Pos | Team | Pld | W | D | L | GF | GA | GD | Pts | Qualification |
|---|---|---|---|---|---|---|---|---|---|---|
| 1 | Saudi Arabia | 3 | 2 | 1 | 0 | 4 | 1 | +3 | 7 | Advance to knockout stage |
| 2 | Thailand | 3 | 1 | 2 | 0 | 2 | 0 | +2 | 5 | Advance to knockout stage |
| 3 | Oman | 3 | 0 | 2 | 1 | 2 | 3 | −1 | 2 | |
| 4 | Kyrgyzstan | 3 | 0 | 1 | 2 | 1 | 5 | −4 | 1 | |

Source: AFC
16 January 2024
17:30

| Thailand | 2–0 | Kyrgyzstan |
|---|---|---|
| Supachai 26', 48' | Report |

Abdullah bin Khalifa Stadium, Doha
Attendance: 4,530
Referee: Adham Makhadmeh (Jordan)

21 January 2024
17:30

| Oman | 0–0 | Thailand |
|---|---|---|
| | Report |

Abdullah bin Khalifa Stadium, Doha
Attendance: 6,340
Referee: Mooud Bonyadifard (Iran)

25 January 2024
18:00

| Saudi Arabia | 0–0 | Thailand |
|---|---|---|
| | Report |

Education City Stadium, Al Rayyan
Attendance: 38,773
Referee: Kim Hee-gon (South Korea)

=== Knockout stage ===
==== Round of 16 ====
30 January 2024
14:30

| Uzbekistan | 2–1 | Thailand |
|---|---|---|
| Turgunboev 37'; Fayzullaev 65' | Report | Supachok 58' |

Al Janoub Stadium, Al Wakrah
Attendance: 18,691
Referee: Nazmi Nasaruddin (Malaysia)
