= 2006–07 Qatar Stars League =

43rd season of top-tier Qatari football

Qatar Stars League
- Season: 2006–07
- Champions: Al Sadd
- AFC Champions League: Al Sadd; Al-Gharafa
- Top goalscorer: (Iraq) Younis Mahmoud (19 goals)

Statistics of Qatar Stars League for the 2006–07 season.

== Overview ==
It was contested by 10 teams, and Al Sadd won the championship.

== Personnel ==
Note: Flags indicate national team as has been defined under FIFA eligibility rules. Players may hold more than one non-FIFA nationality.

Team	Manager
Al Ahli	(Brazil) Ziza
Al-Arabi	(Portugal) José Romão
Al-Gharafa	(Germany) Wolfgang Sidka
Al-Khor	(Brazil) Renê Simões
Al-Rayyan	(Serbia) Dragan Cvetković
Al Sadd	(Uruguay) Jorge Fossati
Al-Shamal	(Brazil) Adilson Luís
Al-Wakrah	(Bosnia and Herzegovina) Mehmed Baždarević
Qatar SC	(Croatia) Srećko Juričić
Umm Salal	(Morocco) Hassan Harmatallah

== Foreign players ==
Club	Player 1	Player 2	Player 3	Player 4	Player 5	AFC player	Former players
Al Ahli	(Brazil) Alexandre	(Brazil) Gabriel Lima	(North Macedonia) Aleksandar Bajevski	(Oman) Badar Al-Maimani	(Senegal) Ibrahima Ba	(Oman) Hassan Mudhafar Al-Gheilani	(Ecuador) Iván Hurtado (France) Cédric Sabin (France) Mickael Marquet
Al-Arabi	(Argentina) Leonardo Pisculichi	(Australia) Tony Popovic	(Bahrain) Mohamed Salmeen	(Brazil) Marcelo Camacho	(Morocco) Bouchaib El Moubarki	(Bahrain) Salman Isa	(Morocco) Abdelilah Fahmi (Portugal) João Tomás (Romania) Ciprian Danciu
Al-Gharafa	(Bahrain) A'ala Hubail	(Brazil) Rodrigo Mendes	(Iraq) Younis Mahmoud	(Morocco) Abdelhaq Ait Laarif	(Morocco) Otmane El Assas	(Saudi Arabia) Taisir Al-Jassim	(Brazil) Ramon Menezes
Al-Khor	(Bahrain) Sayed Mohamed Adnan	(Brazil) Fabrício Souza	(Brazil) Rodrigo Gral	(Burkina Faso) Abdoulaye Cissé	(Morocco) Youssef Rossi	(Oman) Juma Al-Wahaibi	(Morocco) Rachid Rokki
Al-Rayyan	(Brazil) Thiago Ribeiro	(France) Sabri Lamouchi	(Oman) Ahmed Kano	(Poland) Jacek Bąk	(Portugal) João Tomás	(Saudi Arabia) Naif Al-Qadi	(Belgium) Émile Mpenza (Ivory Coast) Blaise Kouassi (Morocco) Bouchaib El Moubarki (Saudi Arabia) Hussein Abdulghani
Al Sadd	(Brazil) Emerson Sheik	(Brazil) Felipe	(Cameroon) Jean Paul Yontcha	(Ecuador) Carlos Tenorio	(Oman) Khalifa Ayil Al-Noufali	(Oman) Mohammed Rabia Al-Noobi	(Algeria) Billel Dziri (Brazil) Ângelo (Ghana) Eric Gawu
Al-Shamal	(Cape Verde) Caló	(Cape Verde) Zé Piguita	(Morocco) Aziz Ben Askar	(Netherlands) Ronald de Boer	(Oman) Ahmed Hadid Al-Mukhaini	(Oman) Ismail Al-Ajmi	(Brazil) Cláudio Tauá
Al-Wakrah	(Bosnia and Herzegovina) Slaviša Mitrović	(Ghana) Mohammed Gargo	(Libya) Jehad Muntasser	(Libya) Nader Al-Tarhouni	(Morocco) Ahmed Ajeddou	(Oman) Hashim Saleh	(Ecuador) Christian Lara
Qatar SC	(Bahrain) Sayed Mahmood Jalal	(Cameroon) Bill Tchato	(Kuwait) Bader Al-Mutawa	(Morocco) Amin Erbati	(Nigeria) Jay-Jay Okocha	(Oman) Amad Al-Hosni	
Umm Salal	(Algeria) Hakim Saci	(Bahrain) Husain Ali	(Brazil) Fábio César	(Morocco) Rachid Rokki	(Morocco) Yazid Kaïssi	(Oman) Said Al-Shoon	

== League standings ==
Pos	Team	Pld	W	D	L	GF	GA	GD	Pts
1	Al Sadd	27	17	4	6	52	29	+23	55
2	Al-Gharafa	27	11	10	6	51	41	+10	43
3	Umm Salal	27	11	6	10	35	28	+7	39
4	Al-Rayyan	27	9	10	8	40	42	−2	37
5	Al-Wakrah	27	7	13	7	29	29	0	34
6	Qatar SC	27	10	4	13	35	36	−1	34
7	Al-Khor	27	9	6	12	35	40	−5	33
8	Al-Shamal	27	7	11	9	26	36	−10	32
9	Al-Arabi	27	8	6	13	35	41	−6	30
10	Al Ahli	27	7	8	12	29	45	−16	29

Source: RSSSF

== Top goalscorers ==
Source: goalzz.com

19 goals

- (Iraq) Younis Mahmoud (Al-Gharafa)

18 goals

- (Brazil) Emerson Sheik (Al Sadd)

16 goals

- (Portugal) João Tomás (Al-Arabi / Al-Rayyan)

12 goals

- (Oman) Ismail Al-Ajmi (Al-Shamal)

11 goals

- (Bahrain) A'ala Hubail (Al-Gharafa)
- (Brazil) Rodrigo Gral (Al-Khor)
- (Oman) Amad Al-Hosni (Qatar SC)
- (Qatar) Mirghani Al-Zain (Al-Wakrah)

10 goals

- (Bahrain) Husain Ali (Umm Salal)
- (France) Sabri Lamouchi (Al-Rayyan)
- (Morocco) Bouchaib El Moubarki (Al-Arabi)
