= 2007 Australia national soccer team season =

Australia
2007 season
- Chairmen: Frank Lowy
- Manager: Graham Arnold; Rob Baan
Home colours	Away colours

This page summarises the Australia national soccer team fixtures and results in 2007.

== Summary ==
The Socceroos played a number of friendly fixtures throughout the year with mixed results; three wins and three losses. More importantly, 2007 was the year Australia first participated in the AFC Asian Cup. After their performance in the 2006 World Cup, Australia entered the tournament as one of the favourites. However, in the opening game against Oman it was only a late equaliser that rescued Australia a point before losing to eventual champions Iraq. It took three late goals to finally see off joint hosts Thailand and go through to the quarter-finals where they would lose to Japan in a penalty shoot-out.

== Record ==
Type	GP	W	D	L	GF	GA
Friendly matches	6	3	0	3	8	6
2007 AFC Asian Cup	4	1	2	1	7	5
Total	10	4	2	4	15	11

== Match results ==
=== Friendlies ===
6 February Friendly	Australia	1–3	Denmark	London, England
	Emerton 85'	(Report)	5', 38' Tomasson; 28' Jensen	Stadium: Loftus Road; Attendance: 12,476; Referee: Rob Styles (England)

24 March Friendly	China	0–2	Australia	Guangzhou, China
		(Report)	8' Holman; 28' Bresciano	Stadium: Yuexiushan Stadium; Attendance: 20,000; Referee: Wu Chao Jue (Hong Kong)

2 June Friendly	Australia	1–2	Uruguay	Sydney, Australia
	Sterjovski 6'	(Report)	40' Forlán; 77' Recoba	Stadium: Telstra Stadium; Attendance: 61,795; Referee: Roberto Rosetti (Italy)

30 June Friendly	Singapore	0–3	Australia	Kallang, Singapore
		(Report)	55', 88' Viduka; 76' Kewell	Stadium: National Stadium; Attendance: 45,000; Referee: Masaaki Toma (Japan)

11 September Friendly	Australia	0–1	Argentina	Melbourne, Australia
		(Report)	49' Demichelis	Stadium: MCG; Attendance: 70,171; Referee: Mike Dean (England)

17 November Friendly	Australia	1–0	Nigeria	London, England
	Carney 53'	(Report)		Stadium: Craven Cottage; Attendance: 11,953; Referee: Mark Clattenburg (England)

=== 2007 AFC Asian Cup ===
8 July Group A	Australia	1–1	Oman	Bangkok, Thailand
UTC+07:00	Cahill 90+1'	[ (Report)]	31' Al-Maimani	Stadium: Rajamangala Stadium; Attendance: 5,000; Referee: Eddy Maillet (Seychelles)

13 July Group A	Iraq	3–1	Australia	Bangkok, Thailand
UTC+07:00	Akram 22'; Mohammed 60'; Jassim 86'	[ (Report)]	47' Viduka; (yellow card) 42' (yellow-red card) 90+3' Neill	Stadium: Rajamangala Stadium; Attendance: 6,000; Referee: Jasim Karim (Bahrain)

16 July Group A	Thailand	0–4	Australia	Bangkok, Thailand
UTC+07:00		[ (Report)]	20' Beauchamp; 80', 83' Mark Viduka; 90' Harry Kewell	Stadium: Rajamangala Stadium; Referee: Kwon Jong-Chul (South Korea)

21 July Quarter-final	Japan	1–1 (4–3 p)	Australia	Hanoi, Vietnam
UTC+07:00	Takahara 72'	[ (Report)]	69' Aloisi; (red card) 75' Grella	Stadium: Mỹ Đình National Stadium; Attendance: 25,000; Referee: Saad Kamil Al-Fadhli (Kuwait)
	Penalties
	Nakamura (penalty scored); Endō (penalty scored); Komano (penalty scored); Takahara (penalty missed); Nakazawa (penalty scored)		(penalty missed) Kewell; (penalty missed) Neill; (penalty scored) Cahill; (penalty scored) Carle; (penalty scored) Carney

== Goal scorers ==
Player	Friendlies	AFC Asian Cup	Total goals
Viduka	2	3	5
Kewell	1	1	2
Aloisi	-	1	1
Beauchamp	-	1	1
Bresciano	1	-	1
Cahill	-	1	1
Carney	1	-	1
Emerton	1	-	1
Holman	1	-	1
Sterjovski	1	-	1
