= 2005–06 Qatar Stars League =

42nd season of top-tier football league in Qatar

Qatar Stars League
- Season: 2005–06
- Champions: Al Sadd
- AFC Champions League: Al Sadd; Al-Rayyan
- Top goalscorer: (Ecuador) Carlos Tenorio (21 goals)

Statistics of Qatar Stars League for the 2005–06 season.

== Overview ==
It was contested by 10 teams, and Al Sadd won the championship.

== Personnel ==
Note: Flags indicate national team as has been defined under FIFA eligibility rules. Players may hold more than one non-FIFA nationality.

Team	Manager
Al Ahli	(Switzerland) Michel Decastel
Al-Arabi	(Romania) Ilie Balaci
Al-Gharafa	(France) Bruno Metsu
Al-Khor	(France) René Exbrayat
Al-Rayyan	(Algeria) Rabah Madjer
Al Sadd	(Qatar) Mohamed Al Ammari
Al-Sailiya	(Brazil) José Paulo
Al-Shamal	(Brazil) Fernando Dourado
Al-Wakrah	(Morocco) Hassan Harmatallah
Qatar SC	(Serbia and Montenegro) Dimitri Davidović

== Foreign players ==
Club	Player 1	Player 2	Player 3	Player 4	Player 5	AFC player	Former players
Al Ahli	(Brazil) Fernando Diniz	(Brazil) Gilmar Fubá	(France) Khalid Souhayli	(Iraq) Haidar Abdul-Jabar	(Oman) Badar Al-Maimani	(Oman) Hassan Mudhafar Al-Gheilani	(Brazil) Sérgio Ricardo
Al-Arabi	(Argentina) Francisco Aguirre	(Bahrain) Mohamed Salmeen	(Brazil) Fábio César	(Ecuador) Iván Hurtado	(Liberia) James Debbah	(Bahrain) Salman Isa	(Kenya) Dennis Oliech
Al-Gharafa	(Angola) Freddy	(Brazil) Rodrigo Mendes	(Brazil) Sérgio Ricardo	(Brazil) Sonny Anderson	(Morocco) Talal El Karkouri	(Bahrain) A'ala Hubail	(Bahrain) Duaij Naser Abdulla (Bahrain) Husain Ali (Brazil) Marcão (Costa Rica) Paulo Wanchope (France) Angelo Hugues (Morocco) Otmane El Assas
Al-Khor	(Bahrain) Rashid Al-Dosari	(Bahrain) Sayed Mohamed Adnan	(Morocco) Abdelilah Fahmi	(Morocco) Rachid Rokki	(Morocco) Youssef Rossi	(Iraq) Younis Mahmoud	(Bahrain) Mohamed Juma (Iraq) Mohammed Nasser Shakroun
Al-Rayyan	(Belgium) Émile Mpenza	(Cameroon) Salomon Olembé	(France) Fabrice Fiorèse	(Morocco) Bouchaib El Moubarki	(Poland) Jacek Bąk	(Oman) Ahmed Kano	
Al Sadd	(Brazil) Emerson Sheik	(Brazil) Felipe	(Ecuador) Carlos Tenorio	(Oman) Khalifa Ayil Al-Noufali	(Senegal) Dame N'Doye	(Oman) Mohammed Rabia Al-Noobi	(Tunisia) José Clayton
Al-Sailiya	(Algeria) Brahim Zafour	(Bahrain) Sayed Mahmood Jalal	(Cape Verde) Caló	(Ghana) Lawrence Adjah-Tetteh	(Libya) Nader Al-Tarhouni	(Oman) Said Al-Shoon	(Togo) Adékambi Olufadé
Al-Shamal	(Cape Verde) Zé Piguita	(France) Samba N'Diaye	(Netherlands) Ronald de Boer	(Oman) Ahmed Hadid Al-Mukhaini	(Portugal) José Soares	(Oman) Hashim Saleh	(Netherlands) Frank de Boer (Peru) Santiago Salazar
Al-Wakrah	(Angola) Akwá	(Bahrain) Duaij Naser Abdulla	(Ghana) Mohammed Gargo	(Morocco) Youssef Chippo	(Netherlands Antilles) Brutil Hosé	(Oman) Fawzi Bashir	(Brazil) Rômulo (Colombia) Johnnier Montaño
Qatar SC	(Algeria) Ali Benarbia	(Bahrain) Mohamed Hubail	(Brazil) Francisco Lima	(France) Marcel Desailly	(Uruguay) Sebastián Soria	(Oman) Amad Al-Hosni	

== League standings ==
Pos	Team	Pld	W	D	L	GF	GA	GD	Pts
1	Al Sadd	27	16	4	7	48	32	+16	52
2	Qatar SC	27	14	7	6	49	34	+15	49
3	Al-Arabi	27	13	7	7	41	36	+5	46
4	Al-Rayyan	27	12	5	10	30	28	+2	41
5	Al Ahli	27	11	6	10	44	40	+4	39
6	Al-Gharafa	27	8	10	9	29	30	−1	34
7	Al-Khor	27	9	6	12	44	49	−5	33
8	Al-Wakrah	27	8	8	11	29	32	−3	32
9	Al-Shamal	27	6	5	16	41	56	−15	23
10	Al-Sailiya	27	5	8	14	29	47	−18	23

Source: RSSSF
