= Bilal Mohammed =

Qatari footballer (born 1986)

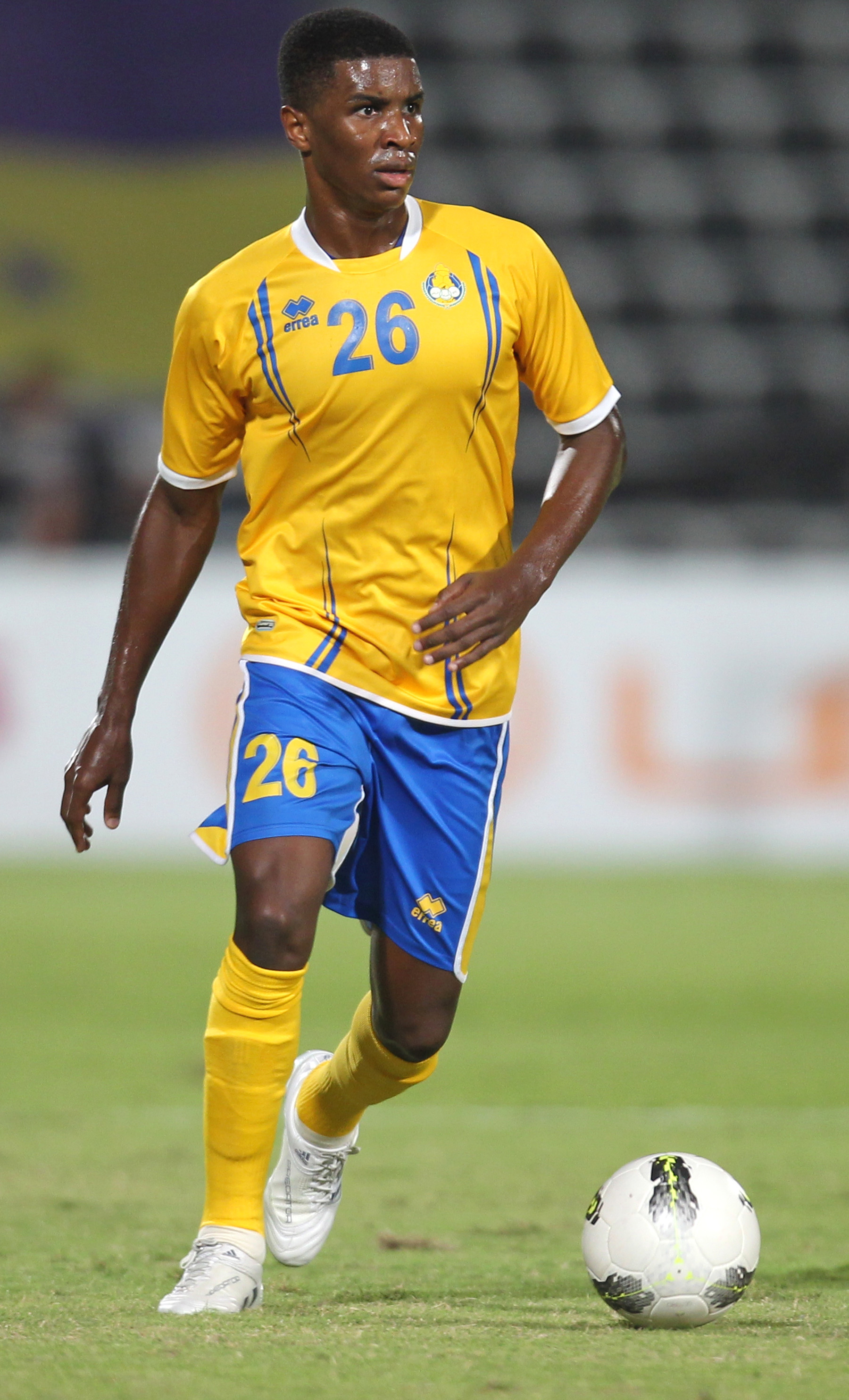

Personal information
- Full name: Bilal Mohammed Rajab
- Date of birth: June 2, 1986 (age 40)
- Place of birth: Qatar
- Height: 1.83 m (6 ft 0 in)
- Position: Defender

Youth career
- 1996–2003: Al Gharrafa

Senior career*
Years	Team	Apps	(Gls)
2003–2017	Al Gharrafa	180	(9)
2017–2018	Al Markhiya	5	(0)
2018–2019	Umm Salal	3	(0)
Total		188	(9)

International career^{‡}
2006	Qatar U-23	5	(4)
2003–2014	Qatar	108	(2)
- * Club domestic league appearances and goals as of November 4, 2017 ‡ National team caps and goals as of December 13, 2014

Bilal Mohammed Rajab (Arabic: بلال محمد رجب; born 2 June 1986) is a Qatari footballer who plays as a defender. He was a long-time captain of the Qatari national team.

== Career ==
Mohammed started his footballing career in the youth team of Al Gharrafa at the age of 10. He went on to make his senior team debut against Qatar SC in 2003. He also made his debut for the Qatar national team in 2003, in a friendly against Algeria in France.

He earned his 100th cap against Malaysia on 19 November 2013.

=== International goals ===
#	Date	Venue	Opponent	Score	Result	Competition
1	August 24, 2008	Doha, Qatar	North Korea	2–1	Won	Friendly
2	January 16, 2011	Doha, Qatar	Kuwait	1–0	Won	2011 AFC Asian Cup

== Club career statistics ==
Statistics accurate as of 21 August 2011

Club	Season	League	League		Cup^{1}		League Cup^{2}		Continental^{3}		Total	
Club	Season	League	Apps	Goals	Apps	Goals	Apps	Goals	Apps	Goals	Apps	Goals
Al-Gharafa	2003–04	QSL	13	2								
Al-Gharafa	2004–05	QSL	18	0								
Al-Gharafa	2005–06	QSL	21	0								
Al-Gharafa	2006–07	QSL	19	1								
Al-Gharafa	2007–08	QSL	8	0								
Al-Gharafa	2008–09	QSL	20	2								
Al-Gharafa	2009–10	QSL	19	1								
Al-Gharafa	2010–11	QSL	16	0								
Al-Gharafa	2011–12	QSL										
Al-Gharafa	Total		134	6								
Career total			134	6								

^{1}Includes Emir of Qatar Cup.

^{2}Includes Sheikh Jassem Cup.

^{3}Includes AFC Champions League.

== Personal life ==
Bilal Mohammed is of Sudanese origin. His father and uncles were also professional footballers.

He married the daughter of former Sudanese international footballer, Shenan Khidr, in February 2012. The ceremony was attended by a number of Qatari and Sudanese footballers.

== See also ==
- List of men's footballers with 100 or more international caps
