= Ahmed Hadid Al-Mukhaini =

Omani footballer (born 1984)

Ahmed Hadid
Personal information
- Full name: Ahmed Hadid Thuwaini Al-Mukhaini
- Date of birth: 18 July 1984 (age 42)
- Place of birth: Salalah, Oman
- Height: 1.73 m (5 ft 8 in)
- Position: Attacking midfielder

Team information
- Current team: Oman (PR manager)

Senior career*
Years	Team	Apps	(Gls)
2001–2005	Al-Tali'aa	?	(2)
2005–2008	Al-Shamal	?	(6)
2008–2011	Al-Ittihad	53	(2)
2011–2013	El-Jaish	28	(0)
2013–2015	Fanja		(4)
2015–2017	Sur		

International career
2003–2013	Oman	103	(9)
- * Club domestic league appearances and goals

Ahmed Hadid Thuwaini Al-Mukhaini (Arabic: أَحْمَد حَدِيد ثُوَيْنِيّ الْمُخَيْنِيّ; born 18 July 1984), commonly known as Ahmed Hadid, is a former Omani footballer who last played for Sur SC in Oman Professional League.

== Club career ==
On 13 September 2014, he signed a one-year contract extension with Fanja SC.

=== Club career statistics ===
Club	Season	Division	League		Cup		Continental (Note: Includes appearances in the AFC Champions League and AFC Cup)		Other		Total	
Club	Season	Division	Apps	Goals	Apps	Goals	Apps	Goals	Apps	Goals	Apps	Goals
Al-Tali'aa	2003–04	Omani League	-	2	-	0	0	0	-	0	-	2
Al-Tali'aa	2004–05	Omani League	-	1	-	0	0	0	-	0	-	1
Al-Tali'aa	Total		-	3	-	0	0	0	-	0	-	3
Al-Shamal	2005–06	Qatar Stars League	-	2	-	0	0	0	-	0	-	2
Al-Shamal	2006–07	Qatar Stars League	-	2	-	1	0	0	-	0	-	3
Al-Shamal	2007–08	Qatar Stars League	-	2	-	0	0	0	-	0	-	2
Al-Shamal	Total		-	6	-	1	0	0	-	0	-	7
Al-Ittihad	2008–09	Saudi Professional League	16	0	4	0	10	1	1	0	31	1
Al-Ittihad	2009–10	Saudi Professional League	18	2	4	0	5	0	1	0	28	2
Al-Ittihad	2010–11	Saudi Professional League	19	0	5	0	7	0	2	0	33	0
Al-Ittihad	Total		53	2	13	0	22	1	4	0	92	3
El-Jaish	2011–12	Qatar Stars League	16	0	0	0	0	0	0	0	16	0
El-Jaish	2012–13	Qatar Stars League	9	0	0	0	0	0	0	0	9	0
El-Jaish	2013–14	Qatar Stars League	3	0	0	0	0	0	0	0	3	0
El-Jaish	Total		28	0	0	0	0	0	0	0	28	0
Fanja	2013–14	Oman Professional League	-	4	-	0	5	0	0	0	-	4
Fanja	Total		-	4	-	0	5	0	0	0	-	4
Career total			-	15	-	1	27	1	-	0	-	17

== International career ==
Ahmed was selected for the national team for the first time in 2003, along with Ahmed Mubarak, Badar Al-Maimani and Ali Al-Habsi.

=== Arabian Gulf Cup ===
Ahmed has made appearances in the 16th Arabian Gulf Cup, 17th Arabian Gulf Cup, the 18th Arabian Gulf Cup, the 19th Arabian Gulf Cup, the 20th Arabian Gulf Cup and the 21st Arabian Gulf Cup.

=== AFC Asian Cup Qualification ===
Ahmed has made appearances in the 2004 AFC Asian Cup qualification, the 2004 AFC Asian Cup, the 2007 AFC Asian Cup qualification, the 2007 AFC Asian Cup and the 2011 AFC Asian Cup qualification.

He scored four goals in the 2004 AFC Asian Cup qualification, a brace in a 7–0 win over Nepal, a goal in a 6–0 win over Nepal and another in a 2–0 win over Vietnam hence helping his team to qualify for the 2004 AFC Asian Cup. In the tournament, Oman won four points in a 2–0 win over Thailand and a 2–2 draw against Iran and hence failed to qualify for the quarter-finals.

=== FIFA World Cup qualification ===
Ahmed has made six appearances in the 2006 FIFA World Cup qualification, four in the 2006 FIFA World Cup qualification and seven in the 2014 FIFA World Cup qualification.

His only goal for Oman in FIFA World Cup qualification came in the Second Round of FIFA World Cup qualification in a 7–0 win over Singapore.

== National Team career statistics ==
=== Goals for Senior National Team ===
Scores and results list Oman's goal tally first.

#	Date	Venue	Opponent	Score	Result	Competition
1	25 September 2003	Incheon, Korea Republic	Nepal	2-0	7-0	2004 AFC Asian Cup qualification
2	25 September 2003	Incheon, Korea Republic	Nepal	4-0	7-0	2004 AFC Asian Cup qualification
3	19 December 2003	Muscat, Oman	Nepal	3-0	6-0	2004 AFC Asian Cup qualification
4	24 December 2003	Muscat, Oman	Vietnam	2-0	2-0	2004 AFC Asian Cup qualification
5	9 June 2004	Sultan Qaboos Sports Complex, Muscat, Oman	Singapore	3–0	7–0	2006 FIFA World Cup qualification
6	24 June 2007	Jakarta, Indonesia	Indonesia	1–0	1–0	Friendly
7	9 June 2009	Stade Pierre de Coubertin, Cannes, France	Bosnia and Herzegovina	1–1	1–2	Friendly
8	10 August 2011	Al-Rashid Stadium, Dubai, United Arab Emirates	Bahrain	1–1	1–1	Friendly

== Honours ==
=== Club ===
- Al-Ittihad

- Saudi Professional League (1): 2008–09; Runners-up 2009–10
- Saudi Champions Cup (1): 2010; Runners-up 2008, 2011
- AFC Champions League (0): Runners-up 2009

- El Jaish

- Qatar Stars League (0): Runners-up 2011–12
- Qatari Stars Cup (2): 2013

- With Fanja

- Oman Professional League (0): Runner-up 2013–14
- Sultan Qaboos Cup (1): 2013–14
- Oman Professional League Cup (1): 2014–15
- Oman Super Cup (0): Runner-up 2013, 2014

=== National team ===
- Arabian Gulf Cup: 2009; Runner-up: 2004, 2007

== See also ==
- List of men's footballers with 100 or more international caps
