= Juma Al-Wahaibi =

Omani footballer (born 1980)

Personal information
- Full name: Juma Abdulla Al-Wahaibi
- Date of birth: 2 March 1980 (age 46)
- Place of birth: Oman
- Position: Defender

Senior career*
Years	Team	Apps	(Gls)
2000–2002	Al-Ahli	?	(?)
2003–2005	Muscat	?	(?)
2005–2006	Al-Tadamun	?	(?)
2006–2007	Al-Khor Sports Club	?	(?)
2007–2009	Al-Tadamun	?	(?)
2009–2015	Al-Shabab		

International career
2001–2007	Oman	22	(0)
- * Club domestic league appearances and goals

Juma Abdulla Al-Wahaibi commonly known as Juma Al-Wahaibi (Arabic: جمعة عبد الله الوهيبي; born 2 March 1980) is an Omani footballer who plays for Al-Shabab Club.

== International career ==
Juma was selected for the national team for the first time in 2002. He has made appearances in the 2006 FIFA World Cup qualification, the 2007 AFC Asian Cup qualification and the 2007 AFC Asian Cup.
