= Mohammed Nasser Shakroun =

Iraqi footballer (born 1984)

Mohammad Nasser
Personal information
- Full name: Mohammad Nasser Shakroun
- Date of birth: 12 March 1984 (age 42)
- Place of birth: Basra, Iraq
- Height: 1.83 m (6 ft 0 in)
- Position: Striker

Team information
- Current team: Iraq U19 (Managing Direct.)

Senior career*
Years	Team	Apps	(Gls)
2001–2003	Arbil		
2004–2005	Al-Talaba		
2005–2006	Al-Khor	16	(4)
2006–2007	Apollon Limassol	19	(9)
2007–2008	Bargh Shiraz	19	(9)
2008–2009	Esteghlal Ahvaz	16	(5)
2009–2010	Shahin Bushehr	16	(2)
2010–2012	Al-Minaa		
2012–2013	Naft Al-Janoob		

International career^{‡}
2005–2008	Iraq	19	(6)

Managerial career
- 2021–: Iraq U19 (Managing Direct.)
Medal record
Men's football
Representing Iraq
AFC Asian Cup
Winner	2007 Indonesia/Malaysia/ Thailand/Vietnam
- * Club domestic league appearances and goals as of 12 May 2010 ‡ National team caps and goals as of December 15, 2010

Mohammad Nasser Shakroun (Arabic: مُحَمَّد نَاصِر شَكْرُون, born 12 March 1984) is an Iraqi former footballer who played as a striker. He played for the Iraq national team between 2005 and 2008.

== Personal life ==
Mohammad is the older brother of former international player Adel Nasser Shakroun.

== Career statistics ==
=== Club ===
Season	Team	Country	Division	Apps	Goals
2005–06	Al-Khor	Qatar	1	16	4
2006–07	Apollon Limassol	Cyprus	1	19	9
2007–08	Bargh Shiraz	Iran	1	19	9
2008–09	Esteghlal Ahvaz	Iran	1	16	5
2009–10	Shahin Bushehr	Iran	1	16	2

=== International ===
Scores and results list Iraq's goal tally first.

#	Date	Venue	Opponent	Score	Result	Competition
1	26 March 2005	Telstra Stadium, Sydney	Australia	1–0	1-2	Friendly match
2	7 August 2005	Bahrain National Stadium, Manama	Bahrain	1–2	2-2	Friendly match
3	13 August 2005	Tsirion Stadium, Limassol	Cyprus	1–0	2-1	Friendly match
4	15 March 2006	Prince Abdullah Al-Faisal Stadium, Jeddah	Saudi Arabia	2–0	2-2	Friendly match
5	17 August 2006	King Abdullah Stadium, Amman	Palestine	3–0	3-0	2007 Asian Cup qual.
6	27 December 2008	Tahnoun Bin Mohamed Stadium, Al Ain	United Arab Emirates	1–1	2-2	Friendly match

== Honours ==
=== Country ===
- 2007 Asian Cup winners
