= Mohammed Rabia Al-Noobi =

Omani footballer (born 1981)

Mohammed Al-Noobi
Personal information
- Full name: Mohammed Rabia Jamaan Al-Noobi
- Date of birth: 10 May 1981 (age 45)
- Place of birth: Salalah, Oman
- Height: 1.80 m (5 ft 11 in)
- Position: Defender

Senior career*
Years	Team	Apps	(Gls)
1999–2003	Dhofar	?	(?)
2003–2004	Kazma	?	(0)
2004–2005	Al-Wehda	?	(0)
2005–2010	Al Sadd	+45	(1)
2010–2011	Al Ahli	?	(0)
2011–2012	Dhofar	?	(0)
Total		?	(1)

International career
2001–2010	Oman	78	(0)
- * Club domestic league appearances and goals

Mohammed Rabia Jamaan Al-Noobi (Arabic: مُحَمَّد رَبِيع جُمْعَان النُّوبِيّ, born 10 May 1981), commonly known as Mohammed Rabia, is an Omani footballer who plays for Dhofar S.C.S.C.

== Club career statistics ==
Club	Season	Division	League		Cup		Continental (Note: Includes appearances in the AFC Champions League)		Other		Total	
Club	Season	Division	Apps	Goals	Apps	Goals	Apps	Goals	Apps	Goals	Apps	Goals
Al Sadd	2007–08	Qatar Stars League	-	1	-	0	0	0	-	0	-	1
Al Sadd	2009–10	Qatar Stars League	-	0	-	0	6	0	-	0	-	0
Al Sadd	Total		-	1	-	0	6	0	-	0	-	1
Career total			-	1	-	0	6	0	-	0	-	1

== International career ==
Mohammed was part of the first team squad of the Oman national football team from 2001 to 2010. He was selected for the national team for the first time in 2001. He has made appearances in the 16th Arabian Gulf Cup, the 17th Arabian Gulf Cup, the 2004 AFC Asian Cup qualification, the 2004 AFC Asian Cup, the 18th Arabian Gulf Cup, the 2007 AFC Asian Cup qualification, the 2007 AFC Asian Cup, the 20th Arabian Gulf Cup and the 2011 AFC Asian Cup qualification.

=== FIFA World Cup Qualification ===
Mohammed has made seven appearances in the 2002 FIFA World Cup qualification, five in the 2006 FIFA World Cup qualification and five in the 2010 FIFA World Cup qualification.
