= Issam Fayel Al-Sinani =

Omani footballer (born 1984)

Issam Fayel
Personal information
- Full name: Issam Fayel Al-Sinani
- Date of birth: 14 August 1984 (age 42)
- Place of birth: Sur, Oman
- Height: 1.75 m (5 ft 9 in)
- Position: Centre-back

Youth career
- 1998–2001: Sur

Senior career*
Years	Team	Apps	(Gls)
2001–2005	Sur	?	(?)
2005–2006	Al-Jahra	?	(0)
2006–2007	Sur	?	(1)
2007–2008	Kazma	?	(2)
2008–2011	Al-Nasr	?	(3)
2011–2012	Sur	?	(1)
2012–2014	Al-Nasr	?	(1)
2014–2016	Al-Nahda		

International career
2007–2008	Oman	8	(0)
- * Club domestic league appearances and goals

Issam Fayel Al-Sinani (Arabic: عصام فايل السناني; born 14 August 1984), commonly known as Issam Fayel, is an Omani footballer.

== Club career ==
On 8 July 2014 he signed a one-year contract with 2013–14 Oman Professional League champions Al-Nahda Club.

=== Club career statistics ===
Club	Season	Division	League		Cup		Continental		Other (Note: Includes goals in the Club Friendlies)		Total	
Club	Season	Division	Apps	Goals	Apps	Goals	Apps	Goals	Apps	Goals	Apps	Goals
Sur	2004–05	Oman Elite League	-	0	-	4	0	0	-	0	-	4
Sur	2006–07	Oman Elite League	-	1	-	0	0	0	-	0	-	1
Sur	2011–12	Oman Elite League	-	1	-	0	0	0	-	0	-	1
Sur	Total		-	2	-	4	0	0	-	0	-	6
Kazma	2007–08	Kuwaiti Premier League	-	2	-	2	0	0	-	0	-	4
Kazma	Total		-	2	-	2	0	0	-	0	-	4
Al-Nasr	2009–10	Kuwaiti Premier League	-	2	-	3	0	0	-	3	-	8
Al-Nasr	2012–13	Kuwaiti Premier League	-	0	-	2	0	0	-	0	-	2
Al-Nasr	2013–14	Kuwaiti Premier League	-	1	-	1	0	0	-	0	-	2
Al-Nasr	Total		-	3	-	6	0	0	-	3	-	12
Career total			-	7	-	12	0	0	-	3	-	22

== International career ==
Issam was selected for the national team for the first time in 2007. He has made appearances in the 2007 AFC Asian Cup and the 2010 FIFA World Cup qualification.

== Honours ==
=== Club ===
- With Al-Nahda
  - Oman Super Cup (1): 2014
