= Ahmed Kano =

Omani footballer (born 1985)

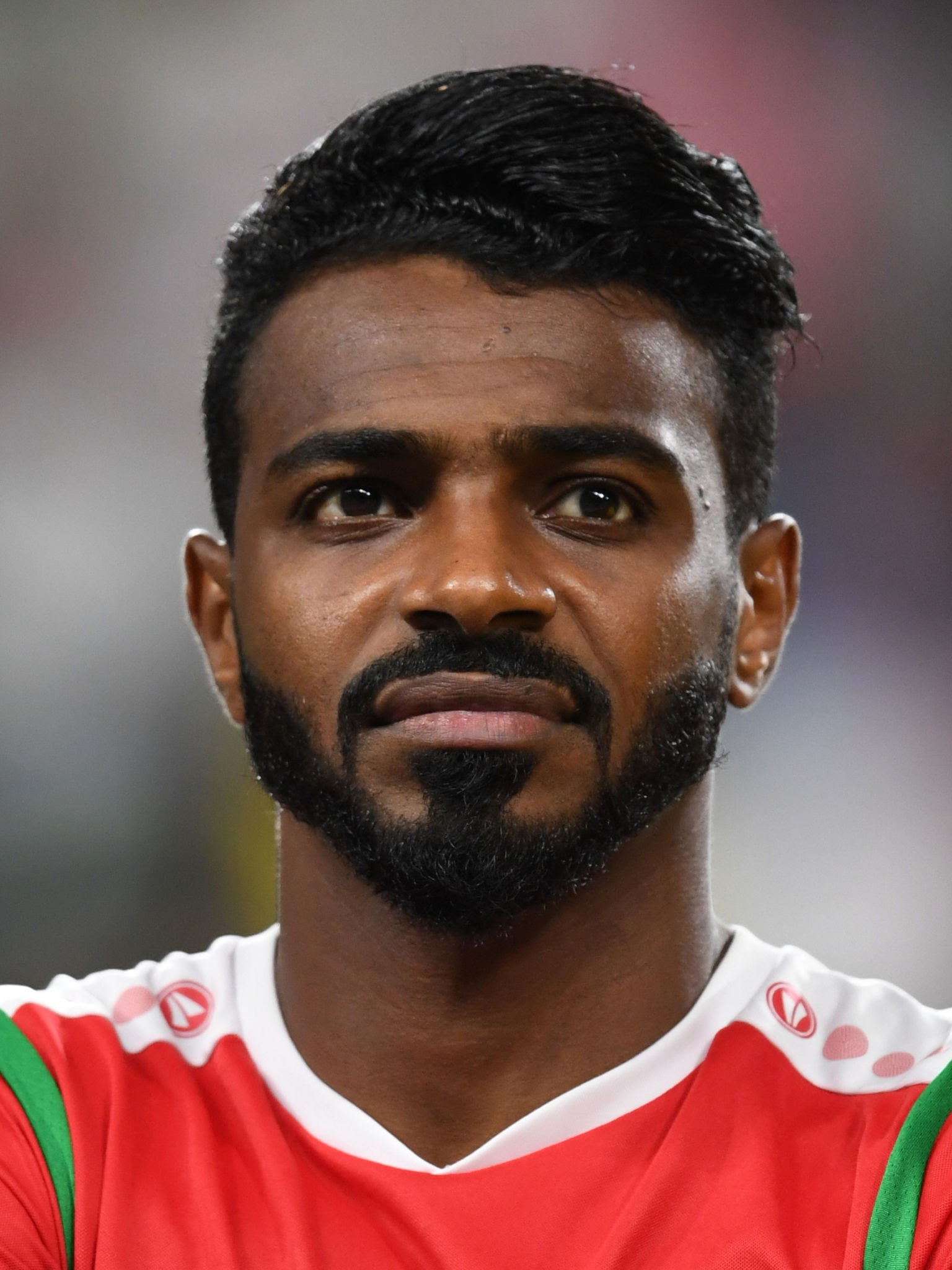
- Al-Mahaijri playing for Oman in the 2019 AFC Asian Cup

Personal information
- Full name: Ahmed Mubarak Obaid al-Mahaijri
- Date of birth: 23 February 1985 (age 41)
- Place of birth: Sur, Oman
- Height: 1.79 m (5 ft 10 in)
- Position: Defensive midfielder

Senior career*
Years	Team	Apps	(Gls)
2000–2005	Al-Orouba	30	(7)
2004	→ Al-Wahda (loan)	11	(0)
2005	→ Al-Ain (loan)	7	(0)
2005–2007	Al-Rayyan	44	(1)
2007–2009	Al-Sailiya	44	(4)
2009–2010	Al-Ahli	10	(0)
2010–2011	Al-Fateh	21	(0)
2011	→ Dubai (loan)	5	(0)
2011–2012	Al-Nasr	19	(3)
2012–2013	Al-Ettifaq	29	(2)
2013–2014	Fanja	25	(1)
2014–2015	Al-Oruba		(6)
2015–2016	Muaither	17	(6)
2016–2017	Al-Markhiya	15	(10)
2017–2019	Mesaimeer	26	(4)
2019–2021	Al-Markhiya	31	(6)
2021–2022	Suwaiq	19	(1)
2022–2023	Al-Orouba	4	(0)

International career
2003–2019	Oman	193	(24)
- * Club domestic league appearances and goals as of 14 July 2022

Ahmed Mubarak Obaid al-Mahaijri (Arabic: أَحْمَد مُبَارَك عُبَيْد الْمُحَيْجَرِيّ; born 23 February 1985), commonly known as Ahmed Mubarak or Ahmed Kano, is an Omani former professional footballer who played as a midfielder.

== Club career ==
Kano has previously played for various clubs in GCC countries with clubs like Al-Wehda Club, Al-Ahli SC, Al-Fateh SC and Ettifaq FC of KSA, Al Ain S.C.C. and Dubai C.S.C. of the UAE, Al-Wakra, Al Rayyan Sports Club and Al-Sailiya Sport Club of Qatar and Al Naser Sporting Club of Kuwait. On 5 September 2013, he signed a one-year contract with 2012–13 Oman Elite League runners-up Fanja SC. On 13 July 2014, he signed a one-year contract with his first professional club Al-Oruba SC.

== International career ==
Kano was a part of the first team squad of the Oman national football team. He was selected for the national team for the first time in 2003, along with Ahmed Hadid, Badar Al-Maimani and Ali Al-Habsi.

=== Arabian Gulf Cup ===
Kano has made appearances in the 2003, 2004, 2007, 2009, 2010, 2013, 2014, and the 2017 editions of the Arabian Gulf Cup. In the 2003 edition of the tournament, he scored one goal in an important 2−0 win against the United Arab Emirates. In the 2014 edition, he scored one goal in a close 1−1 draw against Iraq. And in the 2017 edition, he managed to score a critical penalty kick in a difficult 1−0 win against the hosts Kuwait.

Kano won the most valuable player award of the 2017 Gulf Cup for his role in the success of the Omani team tournament campaign.

=== AFC Asian Cup ===
Kano has made appearances in the 2004 Asian Cup qualifiers, the 2004 Asian Cup, the 2007 Asian Cup qualifiers, the 2007 Asian Cup, the 2011 Asian Cup qualifiers, the 2015 Asian Cup qualifiers, the 2015 Asian Cup, and the 2019 Asian Cup qualifiers.

=== FIFA World Cup qualification ===
Kano has made a total of four appearances in the 2006 FIFA World Cup qualifiers, six in the 2010 FIFA World Cup qualifiers and fourteen in the 2014 FIFA World Cup qualifiers. In the 2010 FIFA World Cup qualifiers, he scored one goal in a 1−1 draw against Japan. He scored three goals in the 2014 FIFA World Cup qualifiers. The first one came in the second round of the FIFA World Cup qualifiers in a 2−0 win over Myanmar, and the other two goals were scored in the fourth round of the FIFA World Cup qualifiers, one in a 2−1 win over Jordan and another in a 1−2 loss against Japan. Oman entered the last game of group play with a chance to qualify for at least the playoff-round, but a 1−0 loss to Jordan eliminated them from the competition.

=== Retirement ===
After his retirement from the national team in 2019, Kano was reported to have scored 23 goals in 180 official caps for Oman, but his total international numbers were later readjusted to 24 goals in 193 caps.

== Career statistics ==
=== Club ===
Appearances and goals by club, season and competition
Club	Season	League			Cup		Continental (Note: Includes AFC Champions League and AFC Cup)		Other (Note: Includes GCC Champions League and Sheikh Jassim Cup)		Total	
Club	Season	Division	Apps	Goals	Apps	Goals	Apps	Goals	Apps	Goals	Apps	Goals
Al-Oruba	2003–04	Omani League	0	6	0	0	0	0	0	0	0	6
Al-Oruba	2004–05	Omani League	0	1	0	0	0	0	0	0	0	1
Al-Oruba	Total		0	7	0	0	0	0	0	0	0	7
Al Ain (loan)	2004–05	UAE Pro League	7	0	0	0	4	1	0	0	0	1
Al-Rayyan	2005–06	Qatar Stars League	22	0	3	0	0	0	0	0	0	0
Al-Rayyan	2006–07	Qatar Stars League	22	1	0	0	0	0	0	0	0	1
Al-Sailiya	2007–08	Qatar Stars League	22	4	2	0	0	0	0	2	0	6
Al-Sailiya	2008–09	Qatar Stars League	22	0	0	0	0	0	0	0	0	0
Al-Ahli	2009–10	Saudi Professional League	10	0	0	0	5	0	0	0	0	0
Al-Fateh	2010–11	Saudi Professional League	21	0	1	0	0	0	0	0	22	0
Al-Nasr	2011–12	Kuwaiti Premier League	19	3	0	0	0	0	0	1	0	4
Al-Ettifaq	2012–13	Saudi Professional League	23	0	2	0	3	1	0	0	28	1
Al-Ettifaq	2013–14	Saudi Professional League	6	2	0	0	5	0	0	0	11	2
Al-Ettifaq	Total		29	2	2	0	8	1	0	0	39	3
Fanja	2013–14	Oman Professional League	28	1	0	0	5	0	0	0	0	1
Al-Oruba	2014–15	Oman Professional League		6	0	0	0	0	0		6	
Suwaiq	2021–22	Oman Professional League	19	1	3	2	0	0	0	0	22	3
Al-Oruba	2022–23	Oman Professional League	4	0	2	1	0	0	0	0	6	1
Career total			0	25	0	3	22	2	0	3	0	33

=== International ===
Appearances and goals by national team and year
National team	Year	Apps	Goals
Oman	2003	6	1
Oman	2004	17	3
Oman	2005	1	0
Oman	2006	7	0
Oman	2007	15	1
Oman	2008	15	1
Oman	2009	13	0
Oman	2010	11	0
Oman	2011	13	3
Oman	2012	8	2
Oman	2013	13	0
Oman	2014	14	2
Oman	2015	16	2
Oman	2016	5	1
Oman	2017	10	4
Oman	2018	12	0
Oman	2019	17	4
Total		193	24

Scores and results list Oman's goal tally first, score column indicates score after each Kano goal.

List of international goals scored by Ahmed Kano
No.	Date	Venue	Opponent	Score	Result	Competition	Ref.
1	31 December 2003	Al-Sadaqua Walsalam Stadium, Adiliya, Kuwait City, Kuwait	United Arab Emirates	1–0	2–0	16th Arabian Gulf Cup	
2	31 March 2004	Jawaharlal Nehru Stadium, Kochi, India	India	2–1	5–1	2006 FIFA World Cup qualification	
3	31 March 2004	Jawaharlal Nehru Stadium, Kochi, India	India	3–1	5–1	2006 FIFA World Cup qualification	
4	1 December 2004	Bahrain National Stadium, Manama, Bahrain	Latvia	1–0	3–2	Friendly	
5	28 June 2007	Jurong West Sports and Recreation Centre, Singapore, Singapore	North Korea	1–2	2–2	Friendly	
6	7 June 2008	Royal Oman Police Stadium, Muscat, Oman	Japan	1–0	1–1	2010 FIFA World Cup qualification	
7	29 March 2011	Seeb Stadium, Seeb, Oman	Tunisia	1–0	2–1	Friendly	
8	29 March 2011	Seeb Stadium, Seeb, Oman	Tunisia	2–1	2–1	Friendly	
9	28 July 2011	Thuwunna Stadium, Yangon, Myanmar	Myanmar	2–0	2–0	2014 FIFA World Cup qualification	
10	16 October 2012	Sultan Qaboos Sports Complex, Muscat, Oman	Jordan	1–0	2–1	2014 FIFA World Cup qualification	
11	14 November 2012	Sultan Qaboos Sports Complex, Muscat, Oman	Japan	1–1	1–2	2014 FIFA World Cup qualification	
12	27 May 2014	Bunyodkor Stadium, Tashkent, Uzbekistan	Uzbekistan	1–0	1–0	Friendly	
13	17 November 2014	Prince Faisal bin Fahd Stadium, Riyadh, Saudi Arabia	Iraq	1–1	1–1	22nd Arabian Gulf Cup	
14	2 October 2015	Sultan Qaboos Sports Complex, Muscat, Oman	Syria	2–0	2–1	Friendly	
15	13 October 2015	Sultan Qaboos Sports Complex, Muscat, Oman	India	1–0	3–0	2018 FIFA World Cup qualification	
16	24 March 2016	Sultan Qaboos Sports Complex, Muscat, Oman	Guam	1–0	1–0	2018 FIFA World Cup qualification	
17	28 March 2017	Sultan Qaboos Sports Complex, Muscat, Oman	Bhutan	2–0	14–0	2019 AFC Asian Cup qualification	
18	13 June 2017	Faisal Al-Husseini International Stadium, Al-Ram, Palestine	Palestine	1–2	1–2	2019 AFC Asian Cup qualification	
19	10 October 2017	National Football Stadium, Malé, Maldives	Maldives	3–1	3–1	2019 AFC Asian Cup qualification	
20	25 December 2017	Jaber International Stadium, Kuwait City, Kuwait	Kuwait	1–0	1–0	23rd Arabian Gulf Cup	
21 (Note: This goal was initially not recognized by FIFA, as the match this goal was scored is not recognized by FIFA.)	2 January 2019	Sheikh Zayed Cricket Stadium, Abu Dhabi, United Arab Emirates	Thailand	1–0	2–0	Friendly	
22	17 January 2019	Mohammed bin Zayed Stadium, Abu Dhabi, United Arab Emirates	Turkmenistan	1–0	3–1	2019 AFC Asian Cup	
23	20 March 2019	Bukit Jalil National Stadium, Kuala Lumpur, Malaysia	Afghanistan	1–0	5–0	2019 Airmarine Cup	
24	28 August 2019	Sultan Qaboos Sports Complex, Muscat, Oman	Yemen	1–0	1–0	Friendly	

== Honours ==
Al-Oruba

- Omani League: 2001–02; runner-up 2000–01
- Sultan Qaboos Cup: 2001; runner-up 2000
- Oman Super Cup: 2000, 2002

Al-Ain

- UAE Pro League runner-up: 2004–05
- UAE President's Cup: 2005
- UAE Federation Cup: 2005
- AFC Champions League runner-up: 2005

Al-Rayyan

- Emir of Qatar Cup: 2006
- Sheikh Jassem Cup runner-up: 2006

Al-Sailiya

- Sheikh Jassem Cup runner-up: 2007

Al-Ahli

- Saudi Crown Prince Cup runner-up: 2010

Al-Ettifaq

- Saudi Crown Prince Cup runner-up: 2012

Fanja

- Sultan Qaboos Cup: 2013

== See also ==
- List of men's footballers with 100 or more international caps
