= 2007 AFC Asian Cup qualification =

Tournament details
- Dates: 22 December 2005 – 15 November 2006
- Teams: 24 (from 1 confederation)

Tournament statistics
- Top scorer(s): (Iraq) Younis Mahmoud (South Korea) Jung Jo-gook (Saudi Arabia) Yasser Al-Qahtani (Saudi Arabia) Saleh Bashir (Syria) Firas Al-Khatib (Uzbekistan) Maksim Shatskikh (4 goals each)

The 2007 AFC Asian Cup qualification was held in late 2005 and the final qualification round was held from February to November 2006 with 25 nations participating.

For the first time, the defending champions (Japan), did not earn an automatic berth in the finals and had to compete in the qualification tournament. Twelve teams from top two of each groups joined with four host nations (Indonesia, Malaysia, Thailand and Vietnam) qualify for the final tournament.

== Teams that did not enter ==
16 national teams did not enter qualifying (The team's FIFA World Ranking was considered for November 2005):

- Turkmenistan [116]
- Maldives [133]
- Tajikistan [141]
- Myanmar [147]
- Kyrgyzstan [157]
- Laos [170]
- Nepal [175]
- Mongolia [179]
- Cambodia [188]
- Afghanistan [189]
- Bhutan [190]
- Philippines [191]
- Macau [192]
- Brunei [199]
- Guam [204]
- (Timor-Leste) East Timor [Not yet ranked]

== Team excluded ==
- North Korea [82] were banned from qualifying after having been found guilty of improper conduct in the qualifying round for 2004.

Thus, out of 46 national teams, 25 entered the qualifying.

== Preliminary round ==
In December 2005, Bangladesh and Pakistan played off in a home and away series (with Bangladesh hosting the first leg), to determine which team would progress to the final qualifying round. This was originally scheduled in November but the earthquake in Pakistan forced it to be postponed.

After a goalless first leg in Bangabandhu National Stadium, Dhaka, Bangladesh on 22 December 2005, Bangladesh won the second leg thanks to the goal from Firoj Mahmud Titu at the 84-minute in People's Sports Complex, Karachi, Pakistan four days later. Bangladesh qualified with the 1–0 on aggregate. However, Pakistan ended up also being qualified into the final qualifying round anyway, after Sri Lanka withdrew.

22 December 2005
16:00 BST

Bangladesh	0–0	Pakistan
	(Report)

Bangabandhu National Stadium, Dhaka
Attendance: 5,000
Referee: Rizwan Ul Haq (India)

26 December 2005
18:00 PST

Pakistan	0–1	Bangladesh
	(Report)	Titu 84'

People's Football Stadium, Karachi
Referee: Rizwan Ul Haq (India)

Bangladesh qualified with the 1–0 on aggregate. Pakistan also qualified after Sri Lanka withdrew.

== Seedings ==
The draw was held on 4 January 2006.

The seeding was based on the 2004 competition, including results during qualifying. The teams in their respective pots also are listed with respect to their performance. Note that Jordan and Uzbekistan were placed higher than South Korea and Iraq. For the tie-breaker here served the fact that Jordan and Uzbekistan were eliminated on penalty shootout, while the other two teams were clearly defeated. Uzbekistan precedes Jordan as it won its group, while Jordan placed second. The same principle is applied to the rest of the teams on the list. The Australian team which had just joined the Asian Football Confederation on 1 January 2006 and had not participated in previous tournaments was given the lowest rank.

Pot A	Pot B	Pot C	Pot D
Japan; China; Iran; Bahrain; Uzbekistan; Jordan	South Korea; Iraq; Saudi Arabia; Kuwait; Qatar; Oman	United Arab Emirates; Syria; Yemen; Lebanon; Singapore; Hong Kong	Palestine; Chinese Taipei; Pakistan*; Bangladesh; India; Australia

* = Replace Sri Lanka

== Tie-breaking criteria ==
If two or more teams in a group are equal on points on completion of the group matches, their places shall be determined as follows:

1. Greater number of points obtained in the group matches between the teams concerned.
2. Goal difference resulting from the group matches between the teams concerned.
3. Greater number of goals scored in the group matches between the teams concerned (Away Goals do not apply in this stage of the competition).
4. Goal difference in all the group matches.
5. Kicks from the penalty mark if only two teams are involved and they are both on the field of play.
6. Drawing of lots.

== Qualifying round ==
- Pakistan is added back into the final qualifying round after Sri Lanka withdrew at the last minute.
- 24 teams will be split into six groups of four, playing in a home and away format. The top two of each group will progress to the finals. Matches will start on 22 February 2006 and ends on 15 November 2006.
- On 1 August 2006, Lebanon officially withdrew from the competition after having played only one match, due to their ongoing conflict with Israel.

=== Group A ===
Team	Pld	W	D	L	GF	GA	GD	Pts
Japan	6	5	0	1	15	2	+13	15 (Note: Tiebreakers: Japan is ranked higher than Saudi Arabia by the two head-to-head game results (Japan 3–2 Saudi Arabia).)
Saudi Arabia	6	5	0	1	21	4	+17	15
Yemen	6	2	0	4	5	13	−8	6
India	6	0	0	6	2	24	−22	0

Notes:
22 February 2006
19:20 JST

Japan	6–0	India
Ono 32'; Maki 58'; Fukunishi 68'; Kubo 78', 90'; Satō 82'	(Report)

Yokohama International Stadium
Yokohama
Attendance: 38,025
Referee: Huang Junjie (China PR)

22 February 2006
16:00 AST

Yemen	0–4	Saudi Arabia
	(Report)	Al Sawailh 14', 89'; Al-Shalhoub 77', 90+2'

Ali Mohsen Stadium, Sana'a
Attendance: 55,000
Referee: Saad Kameel Al Fadhli (Kuwait)

1 March 2006
14:30 IST

India	0–3	Yemen
	(Report)	S. Abdullah 6'; Al-Hubaishi 43'; Al Nono 56' (pen.)

Ambedkar Stadium, New Delhi
Attendance: 8,000
Referee: Mohsen Torky (Iran)

16 August 2006
15:00 IST

India	0–3	Saudi Arabia
	(Report)	Al-Qahtani 2', 19', 50'

Saltlake Stadium, Calcutta
Attendance: 10,000
Referee: Satop Tongkhan (Thailand)

16 August 2006
19:20 JST

Japan	2–0	Yemen
Abe 70'; Satō 90+1'	(Report)

Niigata Stadium, Niigata
Attendance: 40,913
Referee: Lee Gi-Young (Korea Republic)

3 September 2006
20:30 AST

Saudi Arabia	1–0	Japan
Bashir 73'	(Report)

Prince Abdullah Al-Faisal Stadium, Jeddah
Attendance: 15,000
Referee: Shamsul Maidin (Singapore)

6 September 2006
20:30 AST

Saudi Arabia	7–1	India
Bashir 30', 46'; Al Mahyani 33'; Ameen 57'; Al Hagbani 61'; Al Suwaileh 78', 86'	(Report)	Manju 22'

Prince Abdullah Al-Faisal Stadium, Jeddah
Attendance: 3,000
Referee: Mohamed Omar Al Saeedi (United Arab Emirates)

6 September 2006
15:20 AST

Yemen	0–1	Japan
	(Report)	Ganaha 90'

Ali Mohsen Stadium, Sana'a
Attendance: 7,000
Referee: Mahmood Mohd Juma Al Ghatrifi (Oman)

11 October 2006
17:40 IST

India	0–3	Japan
	(Report)	Bando 23', 44'; Nakamura 83'

Sree Kanteerava Stadium, Bangalore
Attendance: 5,000
Referee: Chan Siu Kee (Hong Kong)

11 October 2006
22:15 AST

Saudi Arabia	5–0	Yemen
Bashir 22'; Ameen 27'; Fallatah 65'; Al Mahyani 68', 90+2'	(Report)

Prince Abdullah Al-Faisal Stadium, Jeddah
Attendance: 1,500
Referee: Ala Abdul Kadir Nema (Iraq)

15 November 2006
19:00 JST

Japan	3–1	Saudi Arabia
Tulio 20'; Ganaha 29', 49'	(Report)	Al-Qahtani 33' (pen.)

Sapporo Dome, Sapporo
Attendance: 40,965
Referee: Mark Shield (Australia)

15 November 2006
16:00 AST

Yemen	2–1	India
Al-Haggam 60'; Al-Nono 82'	(Report)	Pradeep 52'

Ali Mohsen Stadium, Sana'a
Attendance: 5,500
Referee: Hassan Marshoud (Jordan)

=== Group B ===
Team	Pld	W	D	L	GF	GA	GD	Pts
Iran	6	4	2	0	12	2	+10	14
South Korea	6	3	2	1	15	5	+10	11
Syria	6	2	2	2	10	6	+4	8
Chinese Taipei	6	0	0	6	0	24	−24	0

22 February 2006
15:30 IRST

Iran	4–0	Chinese Taipei
Teymourian 35'; Madanchi 47', 60'; Daei 82'	(Report)

Azadi Stadium, Tehran
Attendance: 5,000
Referee: Ala Abdul Kadir Nema (Iraq)

22 February 2006
14:00 AST

Syria	1–2	South Korea
Al Khatib 49'	(Report)	Kim Do-heon 5'; Lee Chun-soo 50'

Al-Hamadaniah Stadium, Aleppo
Attendance: 35,000
Referee: Shamsul Maidin (Singapore)

1 March 2006
18:00 CST

Chinese Taipei	0–4	Syria
	(Report)	Chabbo 29', 58'; Al Hussain 45'; Al Khatib 64'

Chungshan Soccer Stadium, Taipei
Attendance: 700
Referee: O il Son (Korea DPR)

16 August 2006
18:00 CST

Chinese Taipei	0–3	South Korea
	(Report)	Ahn Jung-hwan 31'; Jung Jo-gook 53'; Kim Do-heon 80'

Chungshan Soccer Stadium, Taipei
Attendance: 1,300
Referee: Subrata Sarkar (India)

16 August 2006
18:00 IRST

Iran	1–1	Syria
Nekounam 71'	(Report)	Chaabo 88'

Azadi Stadium, Tehran
Attendance: 40,000
Referee: Ravshan Irmatov (Uzbekistan)

2 September 2006
20:00 KST

South Korea	1–1	Iran
Seol Ki-hyeon 45'	(Report)	Hashemian 90'

Seoul World Cup Stadium, Seoul
Attendance: 60,000
Referee: Matthew Breeze (Australia)

6 September 2006
20:00 KST

South Korea	8–0	Chinese Taipei
Seol Ki-hyeon 3', 52'; Jung Jo-gook 4', 45', 88'; Cho Jae-jin 19', 82'; Kim Do-heon 77'	(Report)

Suwon World Cup Stadium, Suwon
Attendance: 21,000
Referee: Chandrasiri Deshapriya Arambakade Gedara (Sri Lanka)

6 September 2006
19:00 AST

Syria	0–2	Iran
	(Report)	Nosrati 20'; Nekounam 56'

Al−Abbasiyyin Stadium, Damascus
Attendance: 10,000
Referee: Kazuhiko Matsumura (Japan)

11 October 2006
18:00 CST

Chinese Taipei	0–2	Iran
	(Report)	Karimi 10', 56'

Taipei Municipal Stadium, Taipei
Attendance: 2,000
Referee: Tayeb Hasan Shamsuzzaman (Bangladesh)

11 October 2006
20:00 KST

South Korea	1–1	Syria
Cho Jae-jin 9'	(Report)	Al Sayed 18'

Seoul World Cup Stadium, Seoul
Attendance: 25,000
Referee: Chaiwat Kunsuta (Thailand)

15 November 2006
15:30 IRST

Iran	2–0	South Korea
Enayati 48'; Badamaki 90'	(Report)

Azadi Stadium, Tehran
Attendance: 30,000
Referee: Abdulhameed Ebrahim (Bahrain)

15 November 2006
14:00 AST

Syria	3–0	Chinese Taipei
Al Jaban 51'; Al Khatib 62', 79'	(Report)

Al−Abbasiyyin Stadium, Damascus
Attendance: 1,000
Referee: Abdullah Al Hilali (Oman)

=== Group C ===
Team	Pld	W	D	L	GF	GA	GD	Pts
United Arab Emirates	6	4	1	1	11	6	+5	13
Oman	6	4	0	2	14	6	+8	12
Jordan	6	3	1	2	10	5	+5	10
Pakistan	6	0	0	6	4	22	−18	0

22 February 2006
18:00 AST

Jordan	3–0	Pakistan
Aqel 30' (pen.); Shelbaieh 38'; Al-Shagran 41'	(Report)

International Stadium, Amman
Attendance: 5,000
Referee: Muhsen Basma (Syria)

22 February 2006
19:00 GST

United Arab Emirates	1–0	Oman
Matar 15'	(Report)

Al-Maktoum Stadium, Dubai
Attendance: 15,000
Referee: Khalil Ibrahim Al Ghamdi (Saudi Arabia)

1 March 2006
19:00 GST

Oman	3–0	Jordan
Saleh 7'; Sulaiman 18'; Zaher 54'	(Report)

Royal Oman Police Stadium, Wattayah
Attendance: 11,000
Referee: Ravshan Irmatov (Uzbekistan)

1 March 2006
21:00 PKT

Pakistan	1–4	United Arab Emirates
Essa 60'	(Report)	Qassim 68'; Matar 78'; Saad 81'; Al Kas 88'

People's Football Stadium, Karachi
Attendance: 10,000
Referee: Satop Tongkhan (Thailand)

16 August 2006
19:00 PKT

Pakistan	1–4	Oman
Essa 79' (pen.)	(Report)	Al-Maimani 15' (pen.), 35'; Al Hosni 27'; Sulaiman 90'

Jinnah Sports Stadium, Islamabad
Attendance: 4,000
Referee: Mohsen Torky (Iran)

16 August 2006
20:00 AST

Jordan	1–2	United Arab Emirates
Ra'fat Ali 88'	(Report)	Omer 52'; Khater 67'

International Stadium, Amman
Attendance: 18,000
Referee: Naser Rashed Al Hamdan (Saudi Arabia)

6 September 2006
19:15 GST

United Arab Emirates	0–0	Jordan
	(Report)

Maktoum Bin Rashid Al Maktoum Stadium, Dubai
Attendance: 9,000
Referee: Saad Kameel Al Fadhli (Kuwait)

6 September 2006
20:00 GST

Oman	5–0	Pakistan
Al Hosni 7'; Bashir 35', 85'; Sulaiman 45'; Al-Touqi 88'	(Report)

Sultan Qaboos Sports Complex, Muscat
Attendance: 10,000
Referee: Ala Abdul Kadir Nema (Iraq)

11 October 2006
21:00 PKT

Pakistan	0–3	Jordan
	(Report)	Abdel-Hadi Al-Maharmeh 16'; Ra'fat Ali 37'; Khaled Saad 85'

Punjab Stadium, Lahore
Attendance: 4,000
Referee: Dilovar Orzuev (Tajikistan)

11 October 2006
22:00 GST

Oman	2–1	United Arab Emirates
Mudhafar 24'; Sulaiman 28'	(Report)	Omer 57'

Sultan Qaboos Sports Complex, Muscat
Attendance: 28,000
Referee: Huang Junjie (China PR)

15 November 2006
17:00 AST

Jordan	3–0	Oman
Amer Deeb 80'; Ra'fat Ali 84'; Al-Sheikh 90'	(Report)

International Stadium, Amman
Attendance: 3,000
Referee: Talaat Najm (Lebanon)

15 November 2006
18:15 GST

United Arab Emirates	3–2	Pakistan
Abbas 54'; Omer 58', 73'	(Report)	Akram 23'; Ahmed 67'

Al Jazira Mohammed Bin Zayed Stadium, Abu Dhabi
Attendance: 6,000
Referee: Subrata Sarkar (India)

=== Group D ===
Team	Pld	W	D	L	GF	GA	GD	Pts
Australia	4	3	0	1	7	3	+4	9
Bahrain	4	1	1	2	3	6	−3	4
Kuwait	4	1	1	2	3	4	−1	4
Lebanon	0	-	-	-	-	-	—	0

Note: Bahrain is ranked higher than Kuwait by the two head-to-head game results (Bahrain 2 – 1 Kuwait).

22 February 2006
18:35 AST

Bahrain	1–3	Australia
Ali 35'	(Report)	Thompson 53'; Skoko 79'; Elrich 87' (pen.)

Bahrain National Stadium, Manama
Attendance: 2,500
Referee: Subkhiddin Mohd Salleh (Malaysia)

22 February 2006
19:00

Lebanon	1–1 Annulled^{1}	Kuwait
A. Nasseredine 70'	(Report)	F. Al Hamad 25'

Beirut Municipal Stadium, Beirut
Attendance: 8,000
Referee: Salem Mujghef (Jordan)

1 March 2006
18:15 AST

Kuwait	0–0	Bahrain
	(Report)

National Stadium, Kuwait City
Attendance: 16,000
Referee: Masoud Moradi (Iran)

16 August 2006
19:30 AEST

Australia	2–0	Kuwait
Dodd 75'; Petrovski 86'	(Report)

Sydney Football Stadium, Sydney
Attendance: 32,622
Referee: Huang Junjie (China PR)

6 September 2006
20:30 AST

Kuwait	2–0	Australia
Al Mutairi 56'; Al-Mutawa 59'	(Report)

National Stadium, Kuwait City
Attendance: 8,000
Referee: Toru Kamikawa (Japan)

11 October 2006
19:30 AEST

Australia	2–0	Bahrain
Aloisi 17'; Bresciano 24'	(Report)

Sydney Football Stadium, Sydney
Attendance: 36,606
Referee: Fareed Ali Mohamed Al Marzouqi (United Arab Emirates)

15 November 2006
18:00 AST

Bahrain	2–1	Kuwait
Yousef 35' (pen.); Ghuloom 43'	(Report)	Laheeb 70'

Bahrain National Stadium, Manama
Attendance: 20,000
Referee: Kwon Jong-Chul (Korea Republic)

^{1} On 1 August 2006, it was announced that the AFC had accepted a withdrawal request from the Federation Libanaise de Football due to the 2006 Israel-Lebanon conflict. The results of the Lebanon-Kuwait game on 22 February 2006 have been declared null and void and do not count towards the group rankings.

The following fixtures were also canceled:

- against Bahrain, 16 August 2006 (in Bahrain National Stadium, Manama, Bahrain)
- against Australia, 31 August 2006 (in Adelaide Oval, Adelaide, Australia)
- against Bahrain, 6 September 2006 (in Beirut Municipal Stadium, Beirut, Lebanon)
- against Kuwait, 11 October 2006 (in National Stadium, Kuwait City, Kuwait)
- against Australia, 15 November 2006 (in Beirut Municipal Stadium, Beirut, Lebanon)

=== Group E ===
Team	Pld	W	D	L	GF	GA	GD	Pts
Iraq	6	3	2	1	12	8	+4	11
China	6	3	2	1	7	3	+4	11
Singapore	5	1	1	3	4	6	−2	4
Palestine	5	1	1	3	3	9	−6	4

Note: Iraq is ranked higher than China PR by the two head-to-head game results (Iraq 3 – 2 China PR).

22 February 2006
19:30 CST

China	2–0	Palestine
Du Wei 23'; Li Weifeng 62'	(Report)

Guangzhou Tianhe Sports Centre
Guangzhou
Attendance: 16,500
Referee: Kwon Jong-Chul (Korea Republic)

22 February 2006
19:30 SGT

Singapore	2–0	Iraq
Amri 24'; Alam Shah 83'	(Report)

Singapore National Stadium, Singapore
Attendance: 10,221
Referee: Mark Shield (Australia)

1 March 2006
16:00 AST

Palestine	1–0	Singapore
Attal 75'	(Report)

King Abdullah Stadium, Amman, Jordan ^{2}
Attendance: 1,000
Referee: Abdullah Al Hilali (Oman)

1 March 2006
16:00 GST

Iraq	2–1	China
Karim 16'; Mulla Mohammed 67'	(Report)	Tao Wei 54'

Khalifa Bin Zayed Stadium, Al Ayn, United Arab Emirates ^{1}
Attendance: 7,700
Referee: Mohamed Omar Al Saeedi (United Arab Emirates)

16 August 2006
20:00 CST

China	1–0	Singapore
Shao Jiayi 90+5' (pen.)	(Report)

TEDA Football Stadium, Tianjin
Attendance: 27,000
Referee: Abdulhameed Ebrahim (Bahrain)

17 August 2006
20:00 AST

Palestine	0–3	Iraq
	(Report)	Mahmoud 59', 62'; Nasser 90'

King Abdullah Stadium, Amman, Jordan ^{2}
Attendance: 5,000
Referee: Muhsen Basma (Syria)

6 September 2006
19:30 SGT

Singapore	0–0	China
	(Report)

Singapore National Stadium, Singapore
Attendance: 39,000
Referee: Tayeb Hasan Shamsuzzaman (Bangladesh)

6 September 2006
20:30 GST

Iraq	2–2	Palestine
Sadir 70'; Mulla Mohammed 75'	(Report)	Amer 13'; Al Amour 78'

Khalifa Bin Zayed Stadium, Al Ayn, United Arab Emirates ^{1}
Attendance: 1,000
Referee: Salem Mujghef (Jordan)

11 October 2006
21:30 GST

Iraq	4–2	Singapore
Mahmoud 35', 68'; Karim 60'; Mulla Mohammed 90+3'	(Report)	Goncalves 9'; Amri 62'

Khalifa Bin Zayed Stadium, Al Ayn, United Arab Emirates ^{1}
Attendance: 3,000
Referee: Mamed Mamedov (Turkmenistan)

11 October 2006
22:00 AST

Palestine	0–2	China
	(Report)	Mao Jianqing 27'; Sun Xiang 65'

King Abdullah Stadium, Amman, Jordan ^{2}
Attendance: 3,000
Referee: Saad Kameel Al Fadhli (Kuwait)

15 November 2006
19:30 CST

China	1–1	Iraq
Han Peng 40'	(Report)	Salah 65'

Helong Stadium, Changsha
Attendance: 0
Referee: Subkhiddin Mohd Salleh (Malaysia)

15 November 2006
19:30 SGT

Singapore	Cancelled	Palestine
	(Report)

Jalan Besar Stadium, Singapore

^{1} All Iraq's home matches played in Al Ayn, United Arab Emirates.

^{2} All Palestine's home matches played in Amman, Jordan.

=== Group F ===
Team	Pld	W	D	L	GF	GA	GD	Pts
Qatar	6	5	0	1	14	4	+10	15
Uzbekistan	6	3	2	1	14	4	+10	11
Hong Kong	6	2	2	2	5	7	−2	8
Bangladesh	6	0	0	6	1	19	−18	0

22 February 2006
16:00 UZT

Uzbekistan	5–0	Bangladesh
Geynrikh 10', 52'; Djeparov 24'; Shatskikh 34', 84'	(Report)

Pakhtakor Stadium, Tashkent
Attendance: 12,000
Referee: Abdulhameed Ebrahim (Bahrain)

22 February 2006
20:00 CST

Hong Kong	0–3	Qatar
	(Report)	Yasser 11'; Bechir 44'; M. Mohamed 90+5'

Hong Kong Stadium, Hong Kong
Attendance: 1,806
Referee: Yuichi Nishimura (Japan)

1 March 2006
16:00 BST

Bangladesh	0–1	Hong Kong
	(Report)	Chan Siu Ki 82'

Bangabandhu National Stadium, Dhaka
Attendance: 1,000
Referee: Subrata Sarkar (India)

1 March 2006
20:00 AST

Qatar	2–1	Uzbekistan
Adel Lamy 45'; Nasser 49'	(Report)	B. Mohammed 20' (o.g.)

Jassim Bin Hamad Stadium, Doha
Attendance: 7,000
Referee: Sun Baojie (China PR)

16 August 2006
16:00 BST

Bangladesh	1–4	Qatar
Arman 23'	(Report)	Rizik 7' (pen.); Adel Lamy 36'; Ibrahim 38', 74'

MA Aziz Stadium, Chittagong
Attendance: 7,000
Referee: Mukhtar Al Yarimi (Yemen)

16 August 2006
19:00 UZT

Uzbekistan	2–2	Hong Kong
Soliev 18'; Shatskikh 35'	(Report)	Sham Kwok Keung 66', 87'

Pakhtakor Markaziy Stadium, Tashkent
Attendance: 15,000
Referee: Qasem Shaban (Kuwait)

6 September 2006
19:00 CST

Hong Kong	0–0	Uzbekistan
	(Report)

Hong Kong Stadium, Hong Kong
Attendance: 7,608
Referee: Lee Gi-Young (Korea Republic)

6 September 2006
20:00 AST

Qatar	3–0	Bangladesh
Yasser 25'; Adel Lamy 30'; Shammari 52'	(Report)

Al Gharafa Stadium, Doha
Attendance: 500
Referee: Talaat Najm (Lebanon)

11 October 2006
15:00 BST

Bangladesh	0–4	Uzbekistan
	(Report)	Zeytulaev 11'; Bakaev 18'; Djeparov 22'; Shatskikh 39' (pen.)

Bangladesh Army Stadium, Dhaka
Attendance: 120
Referee: Tan Hai (China PR)

11 October 2006
21:00 AST

Qatar	2–0	Hong Kong
B. Mohammed 43'; Yasser 53'	(Report)

Al Gharrafa Stadium, Doha
Attendance: 1,000
Referee: Mohammed Kousa (Syria)

15 November 2006
20:00 CST

Hong Kong	2–0	Bangladesh
Ambassa Guy 43', 74' (pen.)	(Report)

Mong Kok Stadium, Kowloon
Attendance: 1,273
Referee: Kim Dong-Jin (Korea Republic)

15 November 2006
16:00 UZT

Uzbekistan	2–0	Qatar
Koshelev 31'; Zeytulaev 52'	(Report)

Pakhtakor Markaziy Stadium, Tashkent
Attendance: 14,000
Referee: Mohamed Omar Al Saeedi (United Arab Emirates)

== Qualified teams ==
Country	Qualified as	Date qualification was secured	Previous appearances in tournament^{1, 2}
Indonesia	Co-hosts	7 August 2004	3 (1996, 2000, 2004)
Malaysia	Co-hosts	7 August 2004	2 (1976, 1980)
Thailand	Co-hosts	7 August 2004	5 (1972, 1992, 1996, 2000, 2004)
Vietnam^{3}	Co-hosts	7 August 2004	2 (1956^{4}, 1960^{4})
Australia	Group D winner	16 August 2006	0 (debut)
Qatar	Group F winner	6 September 2006	6 (1980, 1984, 1988, 1992, 2000, 2004)
Japan	Group A winner	6 September 2006	5 (1988, **1992**, 1996, **2000**, **2004**)
Saudi Arabia	Group A runner-up	6 September 2006	6 (**1984**, **1988**, 1992, **1996**, 2000, 2004)
Iran	Group B winner	11 October 2006	10 (**1968**, **1972**, **1976**, 1980, 1984, 1988, 1992, 1996, 2000, 2004)
South Korea	Group B runner-up	11 October 2006	10 (**1956**, **1960**, 1964, 1972, 1980, 1984, 1988, 1996, 2000, 2004)
United Arab Emirates	Group C winner	11 October 2006	6 (1980, 1984, 1988, 1992, 1996, 2004)
Oman	Group C runner-up	11 October 2006	1 (2004)
Iraq	Group E winner	11 October 2006	5 (1972, 1976, 1996, 2000, 2004)
China	Group E runner-up	11 October 2006	8 (1976, 1980, 1984, 1988, 1992, 1996, 2000, 2004)
Bahrain	Group D runner-up	15 November 2006	2 (1988, 2004)
Uzbekistan	Group F runner-up	15 November 2006	3 (1996, 2000, 2004)

^{1} Bold indicates champion for that year
^{2} Italic indicates host
^{3} Vietnam's debut since the unification of Vietnam at 1975
^{4} As South Vietnam

== Goal scorers ==
4 Goals

- (Saudi Arabia) Yasser Al-Qahtani

3 Goals

- (Japan) Kazuki Ganaha
- (Saudi Arabia) Saleh Bashir
- (Saudi Arabia) Essa Al Mahyani

2 Goals

- (Japan) Hisato Satō
- (Japan) Ryūji Bando
- (Saudi Arabia) Mohammad Al-Shalhoub
- (Saudi Arabia) Al Suwaileh
- (Saudi Arabia) Al Sawailh
- (Saudi Arabia) Mohamed Amin Didi
- (Yemen) Ali Al-Nono
- (Iran) Mehrzad Madanchi
- (Iran) Javad Nekounam
- (Iran) Ali Karimi

1 Goal

- (Bangladesh) Firoj Mahmud Titu
- (Bangladesh) Arman Mia
- (Japan) Shinji Ono
- (Japan) Seiichiro Maki
- (Japan) Takashi Fukunishi
- (Japan) Tatsuhiko Kubo
- (Japan) Yuki Abe
- (Japan) Kengo Nakamura
- (Japan) Marcus Tulio Tanaka
- (India) N.S. Manju
- (Saudi Arabia) Al Hagbani
- (Saudi Arabia) Hassan Muath Fallatah
- (Yemen) Saleem Abdullah
- (Yemen) Fekri Al-Hubaishi
- (Yemen) Al-Haggam
- (Iran) Andranik Teymourian
- (Iran) Ali Daei
- (Iran) Vahid Hashemian
- (Iran) Mohammad Nosrati
- (Iran) Reza Enayati
- (Iran) Hossein Badamaki
