= Zé Piguita =

Cape Verdean footballer

Personal information
- Full name: José Barros Silva
- Date of birth: 26 December 1973 (age 52)
- Place of birth: Praia, Cape Verde
- Position: Defender

Senior career*
Years	Team	Apps	(Gls)
1999–2002	Bairro		
2002–2003	Wasquehal		
2003–2005	Al-Ahli		
2005–2008	Al Shamal		

International career
1997–2007	Cape Verde	26	(0)

Managerial career
- 2014–2016: Académica da Praia
- * Club domestic league appearances and goals as of September 2016

José Barros Silva (born 26 December 1973 in Praia), known as Zé Piguita, is a Cape Verdean retired footballer who played as a defender.

His first club was ADESBA of the Santiago Island League in which he played from 1999 until 2002. He later played in France with ES Wasquehal for a season. He was then one of the first players and defenders of any team in the Middle East, all of them in Qatar, first with al-Ahli of Doha from 2003 to 2005 then al Shamal for three seasons until 2008.

He returned to Cape Verde and in 2013 became assistant coach for Sporting Clube da Praia for a season. A year later he became coach of Académica da Praia until 2016.
