= Badar Al-Maimani =

Omani footballer and manager (born 1984)

Personal information
- Full name: Badar Mubarak Saleh Al-Maimani
- Date of birth: 16 July 1984 (age 42)
- Place of birth: Al Musanaah, Oman
- Height: 1.66 m (5 ft 5 in)
- Position: Attacking midfielder

Team information
- Current team: Fanja (assistant coach)

Senior career*
Years	Team	Apps	(Gls)
2003–2004	Muscat	?	(7)
2004–2005	Al-Riyadh	?	(1)
2005–2007	Al-Ahli	?	(12)
2007–2009	Al-Sailiya	?	(3)
2009–2010	Muscat	?	(5)
2010	Ettifaq	?	(0)
2010–2012	Muscat	?	(0)
2012–2014	Fanja	?	(1)
Total		?	(29)

International career
2003–2012	Oman	77	(16)

Managerial career
- 2014–: Fanja (assistant)
- * Club domestic league appearances and goals

Badar Mubarak Saleh Al-Maimani (Arabic: بَدْر مُبَارَك صَالِح الْمَيْمَنِيّ; born 16 July 1984), commonly known as Badar Al-Maimani, is an Omani Memon football manager and a former footballer who is the current second assistant manager of Fanja SC in Oman Professional League.

== International career ==
Badar was selected for the national team for the first time in 2003, along with Ahmed Mubarak, Ahmed Hadid and Ali Al-Habsi.

=== Arabian Gulf Cup ===
Badar has made appearances in the 16th Arabian Gulf Cup, the 17th Arabian Gulf Cup, the 18th Arabian Gulf Cup and the 19th Arabian Gulf Cup.

He first showed his talent during the 16th Arabian Gulf Cup in 2003–04, scoring a goal in a 2–0 over Qatar. In the tournament, Oman finished at the fourth place, hence reaching its best ever position in the Arabian Gulf Cup competition, reaching the final four round for the first time, with eight points from two wins and two draws.

In the 17th Arabian Gulf Cup in 2004, Badar scored a total of three goals, one in a 2–1 win over the United Arab Emirates, other in a 3–2 win over Bahrain and another in a 1–1 draw against hosts Qatar in the final of tournament hence helping his country to reach the semi-finals and then the finals of the Arabian Gulf Cup for the first time. But Oman lost in the final to the hosts, Qatar in a penalty shootout after the goalkeeping sensation Ali Al-Habsi missed a penalty. Qatar won the match 6–5 on penalties after the match had ended 1–1 at normal time. Amad Al-Hosni was awarded the "Top Goal Scorer" award of the competition with a total of four goals.

He scored one goal in the 18th Arabian Gulf Cup in 2007, in a 1–0 win over Bahrain. This was the second time when Oman reached to the finals but again they lost to the hosts, the United Arab Emirates. Ismail Matar, the Emirati legend, scored the lone goal of the match as United Arab Emirates won their first ever Arabian Gulf Cup.

Finally in 2009, he helped his team to win their first ever Arabian Gulf Cup trophy. He scored one goal in the 19th Arabian Gulf Cup in a 2–0 win over Bahrain hence increasing his tally to three goals against Bahrain.

=== AFC Asian Cup ===
Badar has made appearances in the 2004 AFC Asian Cup qualification, the 2004 AFC Asian Cup, the 2007 AFC Asian Cup qualification, the 2007 AFC Asian Cup and the 2011 AFC Asian Cup qualification.

He scored two goals in the 2004 AFC Asian Cup qualification, one in a 7–0 win over Nepal and another in a 6–0 win over Vietnam hence helping his team to qualify for the 2004 AFC Asian Cup. In the tournament, Oman won four points in a 2–0 win over Thailand and a 2–2 draw against Iran and hence failed to qualify for the quarter-finals.

In the 2007 AFC Asian Cup qualification, he scored a brace in a 4–1 win over Pakistan in the group stage and again helped his team to qualify for the 2007 AFC Asian Cup. He scored one and the only goal of Oman in the 2007 AFC Asian Cup in a 1–1 draw against Australia. In the tournament, Oman won two points in two points in a 1–1 draw against Australia and in a 0–0 draw against Iraq and hence failed to qualify for the quarter-finals.

In the 2011 AFC Asian Cup qualification, he played in two matches but failed to score a single goal. Oman failed to qualify for the 2011 AFC Asian Cup.

=== FIFA World Cup qualification ===
Badar has made five appearances in the 2014 FIFA World Cup qualification and two in the 2010 FIFA World Cup qualification.

He scored two goals in the 2006 FIFA World Cup qualification including a brace in the second round of FIFA World Cup qualification in a 5–1 win over India.

== Career statistics ==
=== Club ===
Club	Season	Division	League		Cup		Continental (Note: Includes appearances in the AFC Cup)		Other (Note: Includes goal in the Club Friendlies)		Total	
Club	Season	Division	Apps	Goals	Apps	Goals	Apps	Goals	Apps	Goals	Apps	Goals
Muscat	2003–04	Omani League	-	7	-	0	0	0	-	0	-	7
Muscat	Total		-	7	-	0	0	0	-	0	-	7
Al-Riyadh	2004–05	Saudi Premier League	-	1	-	0	0	0	-	0	-	1
Al-Riyadh	Total		-	1	-	0	0	0	-	0	-	1
Al-Ahli	2005–06	Qatar Stars League	-	3	-	0	0	0	-	0	-	3
Al-Ahli	2006–07	Qatar Stars League	-	9	-	1	0	0	-	0	-	10
Al-Ahli	Total		-	12	-	1	0	0	-	0	0	13
Al-Sailiya	2007–08	Qatar Stars League	-	3	-	3	0	0	-	0	-	6
Al-Sailiya	Total		-	3	-	3	0	0	-	0	-	6
Muscat	2009–10	Omani League	-	5	-	5	0	0	-	0	-	10
Muscat	Total		-	5	-	5	0	0	-	0	-	10
Ettifaq	2010–11	Saudi Professional League	-	0	-	0	0	0	-	1	-	1
Ettifaq	Total		-	0	-	0	0	0	-	1	-	1
Fanja	2012–13	Omani League	-	1	-	2	2	0	-	0	-	3
Fanja	Total		-	1	-	2	2	0	-	0	-	3
Career total			-	29	-	11	2	0	-	1	-	41

=== International ===
Appearances and goals by national team and year
National team	Year	Apps	Goals
Oman	2003	11	1
Oman	2004	22	10
Oman	2005	1	0
Oman	2006	8	0
Oman	2007	14	2
Oman	2008	9	0
Oman	2009	10	1
Oman	2010	1	0
Oman	2011	–	
Oman	2012	1	0
Total		77	16

Scores and results list Oman's goal tally first, score column indicates score after each Al-Maimani goal.

List of international goals scored by Bader Al-Maimani
No.	Date	Venue	Opponent	Score	Result	Competition
1	25 September 2003	Incheon Munhak Stadium, Incheon, South Korea	Nepal	6–0	7–0	2004 AFC Asian Cup qualification
2	11 January 2004	Al-Sadaqua Walsalam Stadium, Kuwait City, Kuwait	Qatar	2–0	2–0	16th Arabian Gulf Cup
3	31 May 2004	Sultan Qaboos Sports Complex, Muscat, Oman	Maldives	2–0	3–0	Friendly
4	3 June 2004	Sultan Qaboos Sports Complex, Muscat, Oman	Maldives	1–0	4–1	Friendly
5	9 June 2004	Sultan Qaboos Sports Complex, Muscat, Oman	Singapore	1–0	8–0	2006 FIFA World Cup qualification
6	9 June 2004	Sultan Qaboos Sports Complex, Muscat, Oman	Singapore	4–0	8–0	2006 FIFA World Cup qualification
7	9 June 2004	Sultan Qaboos Sports Complex, Muscat, Oman	Singapore	6–0	8–0	2006 FIFA World Cup qualification
8	9 June 2004	Sultan Qaboos Sports Complex, Muscat, Oman	Singapore	7–0	8–0	2006 FIFA World Cup qualification
9	13 December 2004	Jassim bin Hamad Stadium, Doha, Qatar	United Arab Emirates	2–1	2–1	17th Arabian Gulf Cup
10	20 December 2004	Jassim bin Hamad Stadium, Doha, Qatar	Bahrain	2–0	3–2	17th Arabian Gulf Cup
11	24 December 2004	Jassim bin Hamad Stadium, Doha, Qatar	Qatar	1–1	1–1 (4–5 p)	17th Arabian Gulf Cup
12	16 August 2006	Jinnah Sports Stadium, Islamabad, Pakistan	Pakistan	1–0	4–1	2007 AFC Asian Cup qualification
13	16 August 2006	Jinnah Sports Stadium, Islamabad, Pakistan	Pakistan	3–0	4–1	2007 AFC Asian Cup qualification
14	27 January 2007	Mohammed bin Zayed Stadium, Abu Dhabi, United Arab Emirates	Bahrain	1–0	1–0	18th Arabian Gulf Cup
15	8 July 2007	Rajamangala Stadium, Bangkok, Thailand	Australia	1–0	1–1	2007 AFC Asian Cup
16	10 January 2009	Sultan Qaboos Sports Complex, Muscat, Oman	Bahrain	1–0	2–0	19th Arabian Gulf Cup
