= Nader Al-Tarhouni =

Libyan footballer (born 1979)

Personal information
- Full name: Nader Abdussalam Al-Tarhouni
- Date of birth: October 24, 1979 (age 47)
- Place of birth: Tripoli, Libya
- Position: Midfielder

Team information
- Current team: Ismaily SC

Youth career
- Al-Ittihad

Senior career*
Years	Team	Apps	(Gls)
2000–2005	Al-Ittihad	91	(19)
2005–2006	Al-Siliya	26	(5)
2006–2008	Al-Wakra	14	(2)
2008–2009	Kazma		
2009–2012	Al-Shaab		
2012–2013	Ismaily SC		

International career
2001–2009	Libya	46	(14)
- * Club domestic league appearances and goals as of April 15, 2013

Nader Al-Tarhouni (Arabic: نادر الترهوني; born 24 October 1979) is a Libyan football midfielder. He was a member of the Libya national football team.

Al-Tarhouni featured for Libya at the 2009 African Championship of Nations.
