= 16th Arabian Gulf Cup =

International football tournament in 2003–04

Tournament details
- Host country: Kuwait
- Dates: 26 December 2003 – 11 January 2004
- Venue: Al-Sadaqua Walsalam Stadium

Final positions
- Champions: Saudi Arabia (3rd title)
- Runners-up: Bahrain

Tournament statistics
- Matches played: 21
- Goals scored: 46 (2.19 per match)
- Top scorer: (Bahrain) Talal Yousef (5 goals)
- Best player: (Bahrain) Mohamed Salmeen
- Best goalkeeper: (Oman) Ali Al-Habsi

The 16th Arabian Gulf Cup (Arabic: كأس الخليج العربي) was held in Kuwait, between 26 December 2003 to 11 January 2004. All matches were played Al-Sadaqua Walsalam Stadium. Yemen made their debut in the Arabian Gulf Cup.

Iraq continued to be banned from the tournament because of its invasion of Kuwait in 1990.

== Result ==
Team	Pts	Pld	W	D	L	GF	GA	GD
Saudi Arabia	14	6	4	2	0	8	2	+6
Bahrain	13	6	4	1	1	13	3	+10
Qatar	9	6	2	3	1	5	3	+2
Oman	8	6	2	2	2	6	4	+2
United Arab Emirates	7	6	2	1	3	6	7	−1
Kuwait	5	6	1	2	3	6	9	−3
Yemen	1	6	0	1	5	2	18	−16

== Matches ==
26 December 2003

Kuwait	0–0	Oman

26 December 2003

United Arab Emirates	0–2	Saudi Arabia
		Al-Shalhoub 15' (pen.); Tukar 83'

27 December 2003

Bahrain	0–0	Qatar

28 December 2003

Yemen	1–1	Oman
Al-Yamani 54'		Bashir 64'

29 December 2003

Kuwait	0–2	United Arab Emirates
		Rashed 70'; Srour 77'

29 December 2003

Qatar	0–0	Saudi Arabia

30 December 2003

Yemen	1–5	Bahrain
Al-Salimi 15' (pen.)		Salmeen 2'; Hubail 19', 47'; Yousef 40' (pen.); Al-Dosari 75'

31 December 2003

United Arab Emirates	0–2	Oman
		Kano 32'; Saleh 51'

1 January 2004

Bahrain	0–1	Saudi Arabia
		Suwayed 74'

1 January 2004

Yemen	0–4	Kuwait
		Abdulqoddus 33'; Abdullah 40' (pen.); Al-Mutawa 63'; Al-Salamah 87'

3 January 2004

Oman	0–1	Bahrain
		Salmeen 13'

3 January 2004

Qatar	0–0	United Arab Emirates

4 January 2004

Saudi Arabia	1–1	Kuwait
Al-Shalhoub 76'		Abdulqoddus 89'

5 January 2004

Yemen	0–3	Qatar
		Mustafa 22'; Abdullah 39'; Salmeen 58'

6 January 2004

Oman	1–2	Saudi Arabia
Al-Hosni 62'		Noor 69'; Al-Qahtani 90'

7 January 2004

United Arab Emirates	1–3	Bahrain
Khalil 7'		Farhan 27'; Yousef 28', 60'

8 January 2004

Kuwait	1–2	Qatar
Abdullah 5'		Koni 41'; Mustafa 58'

8 January 2004

Yemen	0–2	Saudi Arabia
		Al-Qahtani 9', 31'

10 January 2004

Kuwait	0–4	Bahrain
		Yousef 6', 65'; Hubail 17'; Salmeen 51'

11 January 2004

Yemen	0–3	United Arab Emirates
		Omar 6'; Hatab 21'; Srour 88'

11 January 2004

Oman	2–0	Qatar
Bashir 45' (pen.); Al-Maimani 77'

== Winners ==
16th Arabian Gulf Cup winners

Saudi Arabia
Third title
