= Eddy Maillet =

Association football referee from Seychelles

- Full name: Eddy Allen Maillet
- Born: October 19, 1967 (age 59); Victoria, Seychelles
Years		Role
?–2011		Referee

International
Years	League	Role
2001–2011	FIFA-listed	Referee

Eddy Allen Maillet (born October 19, 1967) is a Seychellois football referee, born in Victoria. He has been a full international referee for FIFA since 2001.

He was selected as a referee for the 2004 African Cup of Nations in Tunisia, the 2006 African Cup of Nations in Egypt, 2007 AFC Asian Cup, the 2008 African Cup of Nations in Ghana, the 2009 FIFA Confederations Cup in South Africa and for the 2010 FIFA World Cup. His first game as referee in the 2010 World Cup was in the Honduras v Chile opening round match on 16 June 2010.
