= Amad Al-Hosni =

Omani footballer (born 1984)

Imad Al-Hosni
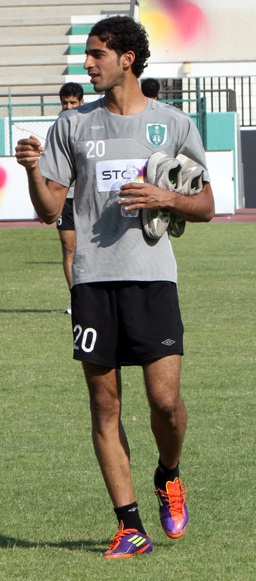
- Al-Hosni with Al-Ahli in 2012

Personal information
- Full name: Imad Ali Suleiman Al-Hosni
- Date of birth: 18 July 1984 (age 42)
- Place of birth: Muscat, Oman
- Height: 1.80 m (5 ft 11 in)
- Position: Striker

Senior career*
Years	Team	Apps	(Gls)
2003–2004	Al-Khaboora	20	(11)
2004–2005	Al-Riyadh	20	(10)
2005–2008	Qatar	69	(37)
2008–2009	Al-Rayyan	23	(11)
2009–2010	Sporting Charleroi	8	(0)
2010	Al-Rayyan	8	(4)
2010–2013	Al-Ahli	68	(32)
2013–2014	Al-Nassr	5	(2)
2014–2015	Saham		(5)
2015–2017	Fanja		(8)

International career
2003–2015	Oman	126	(38)
- * Club domestic league appearances and goals

Imad Ali Suleiman Al-Hosni (Arabic: عماد علي سليمان الحوسني; born 18 July 1984), commonly known as Imad Al-Hosni or Al-Amda, is an Omani former professional footballer who played as a striker. He played for the Oman national team.

== Club career ==
=== Al-Khaburah ===
Al-Hosni started his professional football career in 2003 and joined the Omani sports club Al-Khaburah SC. In the 2003–04 Omani League, he made 20 appearances and scored 11 goals.

=== Al-Riyadh ===
Al-Hosni then moved to Saudi Arabian football club Al-Riyadh based in Riyadh. In the 2004–05 Saudi Premier League, he made 23 appearances and scored 10 goals.

=== Qatar SC ===
In 2005, Al-Hosni moved to Qatar SC, a Qatari football club based in Doha. In the 2005–06 Qatar Stars League, he made 25 appearances and scored 14 goals helping the club to be the runners-up. Also in the 2006 Qatar Crown Prince Cup, he made 3 appearances and scored 1 goal helping the club win the runners-up place. In the 2006–07 Qatar Stars League, he made 24 appearances and scored 11 goals. And in the 2007–08 Qatar Stars League, he made 27 appearances and scored 12 goals.

=== Al-Rayyan ===
Al-Hosni then moved to another Qatar-based sports club Al-Rayyan Sports Club . In the 2008–09 Qatar Stars League, he made 27 appearances and scored 11 goals until his contract expired in 2009.

=== Charleroi ===
Al-Hosni moved to R. Charleroi S.C., a Belgian football club. He made eight appearances without scoring. His transfer to Europe had made him the second Omani footballer to play in Europe, after Ali Al-Habsi.

=== Return to Al-Rayyan ===
In 2010, Al-Hosni returned to his former club Al-Rayyan Sports Club and helped them to win the 2010 Emir of Qatar Cup. He made eight appearances and scored four goals.

=== Al-Ahli ===
Al-Hosni then moved to Al-Ahli SC. He helped the club in winning the King Cup of Champions in 2011 and 2012, also he helped the club to be the runners-up of 2012 AFC Champions League. His standing record in Al-Ahli was 99 appearances with 52 goals.

=== Al-Nassr ===
On 22 December 2013, Al-Hosni signed a six-month contract with Saudi Arabian club Al-Nassr FC.

=== Saham ===
On 8 September 2014, Al-Hosni signed a one-year contract with 2014 GCC Champions League runners-up Saham SC. He made his Oman Professional League debut and scored his first goal on 13 September 2014 in a 3–0 win over Al-Oruba SC.

== International career ==
=== Arabian Gulf Cup ===
Al-Hosni made appearances in the 16th Arabian Gulf Cup, the 17th Arabian Gulf Cup, the 18th Arabian Gulf Cup, the 19th Arabian Gulf Cup, the 20th Arabian Gulf Cup and the 21st Arabian Gulf Cup.

He was in the national squad from 2003, and he first showed his talent during the 16th Arabian Gulf Cup, scoring a goal in a 1–0 win over the Arabian giants Saudi Arabia. In the tournament, Oman finished at the fourth place, hence reaching its best ever position in the Arabian Gulf Cup competition, reaching the final four round for the first time, with eight points from two wins and two draws.

In the 17th Arabian Gulf Cup, he scored four goals. A brace each in a 3–1 over Iraq and in a 3–2 win over Bahrain hence helping his country to reach the semi-finals and then the finals of the Arabian Gulf Cup for the first time. But Oman lost in the final to the hosts, Qatar in a penalty shootout after the goalkeeping sensation Ali Al-Habsi missed a penalty. Qatar won the match 6–5 on penalties after the match had ended 1–1 at normal time. Al-Hosni was awarded with the "Top Goal Scorer" award of the competition.

He scored two goals in the 18th Arabian Gulf Cup, one in a 2–1 win over the hosts the United Arab Emirates and another in a 2–1 win over Kuwait. This was the second time when Oman reached to the finals but again they lost to the hosts, the United Arab Emirates. Ismail Matar, the Emirati legend, scored the lone goal of the match as United Arab Emirates won their first ever Arabian Gulf Cup.

Finally in 2009, he helped his team to win their first ever Arabian Gulf Cup trophy. He scored one goal in the 19th Arabian Gulf Cup in a 4–0 win over Iraq.

He scored one and the only goal of Oman in the 20th Arabian Gulf Cup in a 1–1 draw against Bahrain. Oman failed to qualify for the semi-finals.

In the 21st Arabian Gulf Cup, he played in three matches but failed to score a single goal. Oman again could score only one goal and this time it was from the spot by youngster Hussain Al-Hadhri in a 2–1 loss against Qatar. Oman failed to qualify for the semi-finals.

=== AFC Asian Cup ===
Al-Hosni made appearances in the 2004 AFC Asian Cup qualification, the 2004 AFC Asian Cup, the 2007 AFC Asian Cup qualification, the 2007 AFC Asian Cup, the 2011 AFC Asian Cup qualification and the 2015 AFC Asian Cup qualification.

He scored three goals in the 2004 AFC Asian Cup which included a brace in a 2–2 draw against Iran and a goal in a 2–0 win over Thailand. In the tournament, Oman won four points in a 2–0 win over Thailand and a 2–2 draw against Iran and hence failed to qualify for the quarter-finals.

In the 2007 AFC Asian Cup qualification, he scored two goals, one in a 4–1 win over Pakistan and another in the return leg in a 5–0 win over Pakistan and again helped his team to qualify for the 2007 AFC Asian Cup. Badar Al-Maimani scored one and the only goal of Oman in the 2007 AFC Asian Cup in a 1–1 draw against Australia. In the tournament, Oman won two points in a 1–1 draw against Australia and in a 0–0 draw against Iraq and hence failed to qualify for the quarter-finals.

In the 2011 AFC Asian Cup qualification, he played in five matches but failed to score a single goal. Oman failed to qualify for the 2011 AFC Asian Cup.

He made two appearances in the 2015 AFC Asian Cup qualification, scoring one goal in the penultimate game in a 3–1 win over Singapore and again helped his team to qualify for the 2015 AFC Asian Cup by finishing at the top of the Group A.

=== FIFA World Cup Qualification ===
Al-Hosni made six appearances in the 2006 FIFA World Cup qualification, seven in the 2010 FIFA World Cup qualification and fifteen in the 2014 FIFA World Cup qualification.

He scored two goals in the 2006 FIFA World Cup qualification, one in the second round of FIFA World Cup qualification in a 5–1 win over India and another also in the Second Round in a 2–0 win over Singapore.

He scored a brace in the 2010 FIFA World Cup qualification in the third round of FIFA World Cup qualification in a 2–1 win over Thailand.

He scored two goals in the 2014 FIFA World Cup qualification, one in the second round of FIFA World Cup qualification in a 2–0 win over Myanmar and another in the third round of FIFA World Cup qualification in a 1–0 win over Australia in the third round in a crucial home match which eventually helped Oman to qualify for the fourth round. Oman entered the last game of group play with a chance to qualify for at least the playoff-round, but a 1–0 loss to Jordan eliminated them from contention.

== Career statistics ==
=== Club ===
Appearances and goals by club, season and competition
Club	Season	League			Cup		Continental		Other (Note: Includes goals in the Al-Jazeera Club Friendly Tournament and Club Friendlies)		Total	
Club	Season	Division	Apps	Goals	Apps	Goals	Apps	Goals	Apps	Goals	Apps	Goals
Al-Khaboora	2003–04	Omani League	20	11	0	0	0	0	0	0	20	11
Al-Riyadh	2004–05	Saudi Premier League	20	10	0	0	0	0	0	0	20	10
Qatar	2005–06	Qatar Stars League	25	14	0	2	0	0	0	0	0	16
Qatar	2006–07	Qatar Stars League	19	11	0	3	0	0	0	0	0	14
Qatar	2007–08	Qatar Stars League	25	12	0	0	0	0	0	3 (Note: Goals in Sheikh Jassim Cup)	0	12
Qatar	Total		69	37	0	5	0	0	0	3		45
Al-Rayyan	2008–09	Qatar Stars League	23	11	0	0	0	0	0	0	23	11
Sporting Charleroi	2009–10	Belgian Pro League	8	0	1	0	0	0	0	0	9	0
Al-Rayyan	2009–10	Qatar Stars League	8	4	0	3	0	0	0	0	15	7
Al-Ahli	2010–11	Saudi Professional League	24	9	6	4	0	0	1	1	31	14
Al-Ahli	2011–12	Saudi Professional League	22	15	6	4	9 (Note: Appearances in AFC Champions League)	4	1	1	38	24
Al-Ahli	2012–13	Saudi Professional League	22	8	4	4	6	4	2	2	34	18
Al-Ahli	Total		68	32	16	12	15	8	4	4	103	56
Al-Nassr	2013–14	Saudi Professional League	5	2	2	1	0	0	0	0	7	3
Saham	2014–15	Oman Professional League		5	0	0	0	0	0	0		
Fanja	2016–17	Oman Professional League		8	0	0	6 (Note: Appearances in AFC Cup)	2	0	0		
Career total			0		0				0			

=== International ===
Scores and results list Oman's goal tally first, score column indicates score after each Al-Hosni goal.

List of international goals scored by Amad Al-Hosni
No.	Date	Venue	Opponent	Score	Result	Competition
1	6 January 2004	Al-Sadaqua Walsalam Stadium, Kuwait City, Kuwait	Saudi Arabia	1–0	1–2	16th Arabian Gulf Cup
2	31 March 2004	Jawaharlal Nehru Stadium, Kerala, India	India	1–0	5–1	2006 FIFA World Cup Qualification
3	31 May 2004	Sultan Qaboos Sports Complex, Muscat, Oman	Maldives	3–0	3–0	Friendly
4	24 July 2004	Chongqing Olympic Sports Center, Chongqing, China	Iran	1–0	2–2	2004 AFC Asian Cup
5	24 July 2004	Chongqing Olympic Sports Center, Chongqing, China	Iran	2–0	2–2	2004 AFC Asian Cup
6	28 July 2004	Chengdu Longquanyi Football Stadium, Chengdu, China	Thailand	2–0	2–0	2004 AFC Asian Cup
7	8 September 2004	Jalan Besar Stadium, Kallang, Singapore	Singapore	2–0	2–0	2006 FIFA World Cup qualification
8	7 October 2004	Sultan Qaboos Sports Complex, Muscat, Oman	Iraq	1–0	1–0	Friendly
9	10 December 2004	Jassim Bin Hamad Stadium, Doha, Qatar	Iraq	1–0	3–1	17th Arabian Gulf Cup
10	10 December 2004	Jassim Bin Hamad Stadium, Doha, Qatar	Iraq	2–0	3–1	17th Arabian Gulf Cup
11	20 December 2004	Ahmed bin Ali Stadium, Al Rayyan, Qatar	Bahrain	1–0	3–2	17th Arabian Gulf Cup
12	20 December 2004	Ahmed bin Ali Stadium, Al Rayyan, Qatar	Bahrain	3–2	3–2	17th Arabian Gulf Cup
13	16 August 2006	Jinnah Sports Stadium, Islamabad, Pakistan	Pakistan	2–0	4–1	2007 AFC Asian Cup qualification
14	1 September 2006	Sultan Qaboos Sports Complex, Muscat, Oman	Syria	3–0	3–0	Friendly
15	6 September 2006	Sultan Qaboos Sports Complex, Muscat, Oman	Pakistan	1–0	5–0	2007 AFC Asian Cup qualification
16	13 January 2007	Suheim Bin Hamad Stadium, Doha, Qatar	Qatar	1–0	1–1	Friendly
17	17 January 2007	Zayed Sports City Stadium, Abu Dhabi, United Arab Emirates	United Arab Emirates	2–0	2–1	18th Arabian Gulf Cup
18	20 January 2007	Mohammed Bin Zayed Stadium, Abu Dhabi, United Arab Emirates	Kuwait	1–0	2–1	18th Arabian Gulf Cup
19	17 September 2007	Jassim Bin Hamad Stadium, Doha, Qatar	Qatar	1–0	1–1	Friendly
20	27 January 2008	Sultan Qaboos Sports Complex, Muscat, Oman	Singapore	1–0	2–0	Friendly
21	18 May 2008	Nizwa Sports Complex, Nizwa, Oman	Turkmenistan	1–0	2–1	Friendly
22	18 May 2008	Nizwa Sports Complex, Nizwa, Oman	Turkmenistan	2–1	2–1	Friendly
23	22 June 2008	Royal Oman Police Stadium, Muscat, Oman	Thailand	1–1	2–1	2010 FIFA World Cup Qualification
24	22 June 2008	Royal Oman Police Stadium, Muscat, Oman	Thailand	2–1	2–1	2010 FIFA World Cup Qualification
25	20 August 2008	Royal Oman Police Stadium, Muscat, Oman	Uzbekistan	2–0	2–0	Friendly
26	19 December 2008	Sultan Qaboos Sports Complex, Muscat, Oman	Ecuador	2–0	2–0	Friendly
27	7 January 2009	Sultan Qaboos Sports Complex, Muscat, Oman	Iraq	2–0	4–0	19th Arabian Gulf Cup
28	11 August 2010	Astana Arena, Astana, Kazakhstan	Kazakhstan	1–3	1–3	Friendly
29	3 September 2010	Saoud bin Abdulrahman Stadium, Al Wakrah, Qatar	Malaysia	2–0	3–0	Friendly
30	3 September 2010	Saoud bin Abdulrahman Stadium, Al Wakrah, Qatar	Malaysia	3–0	3–0	Friendly
31	7 September 2010	Jassim Bin Hamad Stadium, Doha, Qatar	Qatar	1–0	1–1	Friendly
32	23 November 2010	May 22 Stadium, Aden, Yemen	Bahrain	1–0	1–1	20th Arabian Gulf Cup
33	28 July 2011	Thuwunna Stadium, Yangon, Myanmar	Myanmar	1–0	2–0	2014 FIFA World Cup Qualification
34	11 November 2011	Sultan Qaboos Sports Complex, Muscat, Oman	Australia	1–0	1–0	2014 FIFA World Cup Qualification
35	5 March 2014	Sultan Qaboos Sports Complex, Muscat, Oman	Singapore	1–0	3–1	2015 AFC Asian Cup qualification
36	10 October 2014	Sohar Regional Sports Complex, Sohar, Oman	Costa Rica	3–4	3–4	Friendly
37	11 June 2015	Sree Kanteerava Stadium, Bengaluru, India	India	2–1	2–1	2018 FIFA World Cup Qualification

== Honours ==
Qatar SC

- Qatar Stars League runner-up: 2005–06
- Qatar Crown Prince Cup runner-up: 2006

Al-Rayyan

- Emir of Qatar Cup: 2010; runner-up: 2009
- Qatar Crown Prince Cup runner-up: 2009

Al-Ahli

- Saudi Professional League runner-up: 2011–12
- King Cup of Champions: 2011, 2012
- AFC Champions League runner-up: 2012

Al-Nassr

- Saudi Professional League: 2013–14
- Saudi Crown Prince Cup: 2013–14

Oman

- Arabian Gulf Cup: 2009; runner-up: 2004, 2007

Individual

- Arabian Gulf Cup Top Scorer: 2004
- Arabian Gulf Cup Best Player of the Tournament: 2004

== See also ==
- List of men's footballers with 100 or more international caps
