= Kwon Jong-chul =

South Korean football referee

Kwon Jong-Chul
- Full name: Kwon Jong-Chul
- Born: September 11, 1963 (age 63)

International
Years	League	Role
1997–	FIFA listed	Referee

Kwon Jong-Chul (Korean: 권종철; born 11 September 1963) is a retired South Korean football referee.

He was a referee at the 2004 and 2007 AFC Asian Cup. Kwon also officiated in many FIFA events, including the 2003 and 2005 FIFA World Youth Championships, and qualifying matches for the 2002, 2006, and 2010 World Cups. Kwon was named to FIFA's list of 44 candidate referees for the 2006 FIFA World Cup in Germany, but was not selected for the final competition.

After concluding his career as a match official, Kwon has served as referee coordinator for the Korea Football Association.
