= Lee Gi-young =

South Korean football referee

Lee Gi-Young
- Full name: Lee Gi-Young
- Born: November 15, 1965 (age 60)

International
Years	League	Role

Lee Gi-Young (Korean: 이기영; born 15 November 1965) is a South Korean football referee.

He was a referee at the 2007 AFC Asian Cup. Lee's other events included qualifying matches for the 2010 World Cup.
