= Khamis Al-Zahrani =

Arabian football Midfielder

Personal information
- Full name: Khamis Mohammed Al-Zahrani
- Date of birth: 3 August 1976 (age 50)
- Place of birth: Ta'if, Saudi Arabia
- Position: Midfielder

Senior career*
Years	Team	Apps	(Gls)
1996–2006	Al-Ittihad	-	(-)

International career
1996–1999	Saudi Arabia	20	(1)
- * Club domestic league appearances and goals

Khamis Al-Zahrani (Arabic: خميس الزهراني; born 3 August 1976) is a Saudi Arabian footballer who played as a midfielder for Al-Ittihad and the Saudi Arabia national team. He participated in the 1996 Asian Cup and the 1997 FIFA Confederations Cup.

== Honours ==
Al-Ittihad

- Saudi Premier League: 1996–97, 1998–99, 1999–2000, 2000–01, 2002–03
- Crown Prince Cup: 1997, 2001, 2004
- Saudi Federation Cup: 1997, 1999
- Saudi-Egyptian Super Cup: 2001, 2003
- AFC Champions League: 2004, 2005
- Asian Cup Winners' Cup: 1998–99
- Arab Champions League: 2004–05
- Gulf Club Champions Cup: 1999

Saudi Arabia

- AFC Asian Cup: 1996
