= Saleh Al-Saqri =

Saudi Arabian footballer

Personal information
- Full name: Saleh Fahad Al-Saqri
- Date of birth: 23 January 1979 (age 47)
- Place of birth: Ha'il, Saudi Arabia
- Height: 1.74 m (5 ft 8 1/2 in)
- Position: Defender

Senior career*
Years	Team	Apps	(Gls)
1997–1999	Al-Tai	?	(?)
1999–2012	Al Ittihad	314	(27)
2012	Al-Etiffaq	1	(0)

International career^{‡}
2000–2007	Saudi Arabia	54	(1)
- * Club domestic league appearances and goals as of 22/3/2011 ‡ National team caps and goals as of 22/3/2011

Saleh Al-Saqri (Arabic: صالح الصقري; born 23 January 1979) is a retired Saudi Arabian footballer who played as a defender for Al-Tai, Al-Ittihad and Al-Etiffaq. He also played for the Saudi Arabia national team.

Al-Saqri played for Saudi Arabia at the 1999 FIFA World Youth Championship in Nigeria.

== Honours ==
Al-Ittihad

- Saudi Professional League: 1999–2000, 2000–01, 2002–03, 2006–07, 2008–09
- King Cup: 2010
- Crown Prince Cup: 2001, 2004
- Saudi-Egyptian Super Cup: 2001, 2003
- AFC Champions League: 2004, 2005
- Asian Cup Winners' Cup: 1998–99
- Arab Champions League: 2004–05

Saudi Arabia

- Arabian Gulf Cup: 2002
- Arab Cup: 2002
