= Mabrouk Zaid =

Saudi Arabian footballer

Personal information
- Full name: Mabrouk Zaid
- Date of birth: 11 February 1979 (age 47)
- Place of birth: Riyadh, Saudi Arabia
- Height: 1.85 m (6 ft 1 in)
- Position: Goalkeeper

Senior career*
Years	Team	Apps	(Gls)
1998–2000	Al-Riyadh SC		
2000–2014	Al-Ittihad		

International career^{‡}
2001–2011	Saudi Arabia	43	(0)
- * Club domestic league appearances and goals as of 14 June 2006 ‡ National team caps and goals as of 23 June 2006

Mabrouk Zaid (Arabic: مبروك زايد; born 11 February 1979) is a Saudi Arabian former association football player who last played as a goalkeeper for Al-Ittihad.

Zaid was a member of the Saudi Arabia national team and was called up to the squad to participate in the 2006 FIFA World Cup.

== Honours ==
=== International ===
- Arabian Gulf Cup: 2003

=== Al-Ittihad ===
- AFC Champions League: 2004, 2005
- Saudi Professional League: 2000–01, 2002–03, 2006–07, 2008–09
- Saudi Crown Prince Cup: 2001, 2004
- Arab Champions League: 2004–05
- Saudi-Egyptian Super Cup: 2001, 2003
