= Manaf Abushgeer =

Saudi Arabian footballer

Personal information
- Full name: Manaf Eid Abushgeer
- Date of birth: 5 February 1980 (age 46)
- Place of birth: Jeddah, Saudi Arabia
- Height: 1.65 m (5 ft 5 in)
- Position: Left midfielder

Youth career
- 1988–1999: Al Ittihad

Senior career*
Years	Team	Apps	(Gls)
1999–2012	Al Ittihad	234	(30)

International career
2001–2011	Saudi Arabia	37	(0)
- * Club domestic league appearances and goals

Manaf Eid Abushgeer (Arabic: مناف عيد أبوشقير, born 5 February 1980) is a former professional footballer from Jeddah, Saudi Arabia. A full Saudi Arabian international, he plays for Al Ittihad in the left midfield position.

Most notably with Al-Ittihad, Abushgeer won the AFC Champions League consecutively in the years 2004 and 2005, and then went on to play with his team in the 2005 FIFA Club World Cup, finishing in 4th place.

== Honours ==
Al-Ittihad

- Saudi Premier League/Saudi Pro League: 1999–2000, 2000–01, 2002–03, 2006–07, 2008–09
- King Cup: 2010
- Crown Prince Cup: 2001, 2004
- Saudi-Egyptian Super Cup: 2001, 2003
- AFC Champions League: 2004, 2005
- Arab Champions League: 2004–05

Saudi Arabia

- Arabian Gulf Cup: 2003
