= 2001 Saudi Crown Prince Cup =

2001 Crown Prince Cup
Tournament details
- Country: Saudi Arabia
- Dates: 10 March – 2 May 2001
- Teams: 16 (main competition)

Final positions
- Champions: Al-Ittihad (6th title)
- Runners-up: Al-Ettifaq

Tournament statistics
- Matches played: 15
- Goals scored: 43 (2.87 per match)
- Top goal scorer(s): Sérgio Ricardo (4 goals)

The 2001 Crown Prince Cup was the 26th season of the Saudi premier knockout tournament since its establishment in 1957. The main competition started on 10 March 2001 and concluded with the final on 2 May 2001.

Al-Hilal were the defending champions, but were eliminated in the semi-finals by Al-Ittihad.

In the final, Al-Ittihad defeated Al-Ettifaq 3–0 to secure their record-extending sixth title and first since 1997. The final was held at the Prince Abdullah Al-Faisal Stadium in Jeddah.

== Qualifying rounds ==
All of the competing teams that are not members of the Premier League competed in the qualifying rounds to secure one of 4 available places in the Round of 16. First Division sides Abha, Al-Khaleej, Al-Raed and Al-Tai qualified.

== Bracket ==
Round of 16
H	Al-Shabab (asdet)	2
A	Al-Khaleej	1
H	Al-Wehda	2
A	Al-Najma	0
A	Al-Nassr	1
H	Al-Tai (asdet)	2
H	Al-Ettifaq	2
A	Al-Qadisiyah	0
H	Al-Ittihad	4
A	Abha	0
H	Al-Riyadh (asdet)	2
A	Sdoos	1
H	Al-Ahli	2
A	Al-Ansar	0
A	Al-Hilal (asdet)	2
H	Al-Raed	1

Quarter-finals
A	Al-Shabab	2
H	Al-Wehda	1
H	Al-Tai	1
A	Al-Ettifaq	2
A	Al-Ittihad	2
H	Al-Riyadh	1
A	Al-Ahli	0
H	Al-Hilal	4

Semi-finals
H	Al-Shabab	0
A	Al-Ettifaq	1
A	Al-Ittihad (pen.)	2 (6)
H	Al-Hilal	2 (5)

Final
–	Al-Ettifaq	0
–	Al-Ittihad	3

Source: Al Jazirah

== Round of 16 ==
The Round of 16 fixtures were played on 10, 13, 14, 15 and 16 March 2001. Al-Shabab's match was moved to 10 March due to their participation in the Round of 16 of the 2000–01 Asian Cup Winners' Cup. All times are local, AST (UTC+3).

10 March 2001 1	Al-Shabab (1)	2–1 (a.e.t.)	Al-Khaleej (2)	Riyadh
20:00	Al-Owairan 44' (pen.); Jelassi 105'	Report	Al-Salem 65'	Stadium: Prince Faisal bin Fahd Stadium; Referee: Mamdouh Al-Mirdas

13 March 2001 4	Al-Ettifaq (1)	2–0	Al-Qadisiyah (1)	Dammam
20:00	Al-Yami 60', 62'	Report		Stadium: Prince Faisal bin Fahd Stadium; Referee: Abdulrahman Al-Zaid

13 March 2001 6	Al-Riyadh (1)	2–1 (a.e.t.)	Sdoos (1)	Riyadh
20:00	Al-Dhuayan 80'; Al-Qahtani 104'	Report	Al-Zahrani 6'	Stadium: Prince Faisal bin Fahd Stadium; Referee: Yousef Al-Aqili

13 March 2001 7	Al-Ahli (1)	2–0	Al-Ansar (1)	Jeddah
20:00	Al-Meshal 3'; Al-Jahani	Report		Stadium: Prince Abdullah Al-Faisal Stadium; Referee: Omer Al Mehannah

14 March 2001 3	Al-Tai (2)	2–1 (a.e.t.)	Al-Nassr (1)	Ha'il
20:00	Al-Dawod 20' (o.g.); Hamad Ji 96'	Report	Reinaldo 32'	Stadium: Prince Abdul Aziz bin Musa'ed Stadium; Referee: Abdulaziz Al-Dakheel

15 March 2001 2	Al-Wehda (1)	2–0	Al-Najma (1)	Mecca
20:00	Abdelzaher 66'; Al-Hazmi 74'	Report		Stadium: King Abdul Aziz Stadium; Referee: Ibrahim Al-Omar

15 March 2001 5	Al-Ittihad (1)	4–0	Abha (2)	Jeddah
20:00	Noor; Abushgeer 53'; Al-Yami 57'; Sérgio 62'	Report		Stadium: Prince Abdullah Al-Faisal Stadium

16 March 2001 8	Al-Raed (2)	1–2 (a.e.t.)	Al-Hilal (1)	Al-Kharj
20:00	Al-Salal 67'	Report	Al-Dokhi 5'; Al-Jaber 98' (pen.)	Stadium: Al-Shoulla Club Stadium; Referee: Mohammed Al-Bishri

== Quarter-finals ==
The Quarter-finals fixtures were played on 29, 30 and 31 March 2001. All times are local, AST (UTC+3).

29 March 2001 10	Al-Tai (2)	1–2	Al-Ettifaq (1)	Ha'il
20:35	Al-Sharrar 15'	Report	Silva 4'; Shuaib 56'	Stadium: Prince Abdul Aziz bin Musa'ed Stadium; Referee: Abdulrahman Al-Zaid

29 March 2001 12	Al-Hilal (1)	4–0	Al-Ahli (1)	Riyadh
20:35	Rôni 40', 89'; Al-Temyat 54'; Al-Jaber 90+1'	Report		Stadium: King Fahd International Stadium; Referee: Omer Al Mehannah

30 March 2001 9	Al-Wehda (1)	1–2	Al-Shabab (1)	Mecca
20:35	Al-Harshan 40'	Report	Khathran 52', 83'	Stadium: King Abdul Aziz Stadium; Referee: Nasser Al-Hamdan

31 March 2001 11	Al-Riyadh (1)	1–2	Al-Ittihad (1)	Riyadh
20:35	Al-Mufarrij 90+2'	Report	Sérgio 57', 89' (pen.)	Stadium: Prince Faisal bin Fahd Stadium; Referee: Yousef Al-Aqili

== Semi-finals ==
The Semi-finals fixtures were played on 12 and 13 April 2001. All times are local, AST (UTC+3).

12 April 2001 13	Al-Shabab (1)	0–1	Al-Ettifaq (1)	Riyadh
20:35		Report	Al-Dossari 40'	Stadium: Prince Faisal bin Fahd Stadium; Referee: Ibrahim Al-Omar

13 April 2001 14	Al-Hilal (1)	2–2 (a.e.t.) (5–6 p)	Al-Ittihad (1)	Riyadh
20:45	Rôni 60'; Al-Ghamdi 65'	Report	Al-Yami 45+1'; Sérgio 81'	Stadium: King Fahd International Stadium; Referee: Abdulaziz Al-Dakheel
	Penalties
	Al-Jaber (penalty missed); Rôni (penalty scored); Pérez (penalty scored); Al-Shalhoub (penalty scored); Al-Temawi (penalty scored); Al-Deayea (penalty scored); Khalil (penalty missed); Al-Shareedah (penalty missed); Al-Masaari (penalty missed)		(penalty scored) Gelsi; (penalty missed) Sérgio; (penalty scored) Al-Shamrani; (penalty scored) Suhail; (penalty scored) Noor; (penalty scored) Al-Yami; (penalty missed) Al-Khilaiwi; (penalty missed) Sheliah; (penalty scored) Khuraish

== Final ==
The 2001 Crown Prince Cup Final was played on 2 May 2001 at the Prince Abdullah Al-Faisal Stadium in Jeddah between Al-Ettifaq and Al-Ittihad. This was the seventh Crown Prince Cup final to be held at the stadium. The two sides met twice in the final, Al-Ettifaq won in 1965 while Al-Ittihad won in 1963. This was Al-Ettifaq's first final since 1965 and Al-Ittihad first since 1997. All times are local, AST (UTC+3).

2 May 2001
20:30

Al-Ettifaq	0–3	Al-Ittihad
	Report	Al-Yami 57'; Gelsi 61' (pen.); Khalil 65' (o.g.)

Prince Abdullah Al-Faisal Stadium, Jeddah
Referee: Nasser Al-Hamdan

== Top goalscorers ==
Rank	Player	Club	Goals
1	(Brazil) Sérgio Ricardo	Al-Ittihad	4
2	(Brazil) Rôni	Al-Hilal	3
2	(Saudi Arabia) Al Hasan Al-Yami	Al-Ittihad	3
4	(Saudi Arabia) Abdulrahman Al-Yami	Al-Ettifaq	2
4	(Saudi Arabia) Sami Al-Jaber	Al-Hilal	2
4	(Saudi Arabia) Abdulaziz Khathran	Al-Shabab	2

== See also ==
- 2000–01 Saudi Premier League
