= 2004 Saudi Crown Prince Cup =

2004 Crown Prince Cup
Tournament details
- Country: Saudi Arabia
- Dates: 26 February – 26 March 2004
- Teams: 16

Final positions
- Champions: Al-Ittihad (7th title)
- Runners-up: Al-Ahli

Tournament statistics
- Matches played: 17
- Goals scored: 56 (3.29 per match)
- Top goal scorer(s): Hamad Ji; Jatto Ceesay; Tcheco; Dimba; Hicham Aboucherouane (3 goals each)

The 2004 Crown Prince Cup was the 29th season of the Saudi premier knockout tournament since its establishment in 1957. It started on 26 February 2004 and concluded with the final on 26 March 2004.

Al-Hilal were the defending champions, but were eliminated in the semi-finals by Al-Ahli.

Al-Ittihad won their record-extending seventh title following a 1–0 win over derby rivals Al-Ahli in the final.

The winners of the competition would have earned a place in the group stage of the 2005 AFC Champions League. However, since Al-Ittihad went on to win the 2004 AFC Champions League, they qualified for the 2005 AFC Champions League as the titleholders. Since Al-Ittihad also finished runners-up in the league, Al-Ahli, the cup runners-up, took this Champions League spot.

== Bracket ==
Round of 16
H	Al-Ittihad	3
A	Al-Akhdoud	0
H	Al-Ettifaq	2
A	Al-Khaleej	0
A	Al-Nassr	4
H	Al-Riyadh	2
A	Al-Tai	4
H	Al-Faisaly	1
H	Al-Qadisiyah	2
A	Al-Shoulla	1
H	Al-Hilal	7
A	Al-Nahda	1
H	Al-Ahli	5
A	Al-Wehda	1
A	Al-Shabab	3
H	Al-Ansar	0

Quarter-finals
A	Al-Ittihad (asdet)	1
H	Al-Ettifaq	0
H	Al-Nassr	4
A	Al-Tai	0
H	Al-Qadisiyah	0
A	Al-Hilal	1
A	Al-Ahli	2
H	Al-Shabab	1

Semi-finals
A	Al-Ittihad	3	2	5
H	Al-Nassr	1	1	2
A	Al-Hilal	1	0	1
H	Al-Ahli	2	0	2

Final
–	Al-Ittihad	1
–	Al-Ahli	0

Source: Al Jazirah

== Round of 16 ==
The Round of 16 fixtures were played on 26, 27, 28 and 29 February 2004. All times are local, AST (UTC+3).

26 February 2004 2	Al-Ettifaq (1)	2–0	Al-Khaleej (1)	Dammam
20:00	Al-Bashah 55'; Al-Bahri 65' (pen.)	Report		Stadium: Prince Mohamed bin Fahd Stadium; Referee: Abdulrahman Al-Zaid

26 February 2004 3	Al-Riyadh (1)	2–4	Al-Nassr (1)	Riyadh
20:00	Cesar 76'; Al-Suwailem 82'	Report	Al-Shahrani 3'; Al-Zahrani 18'; Al-Harthi 47'; Akram 54' (pen.)	Stadium: Prince Faisal bin Fahd Stadium; Referee: Ali Al-Mutlaq

26 February 2004 4	Al-Faisaly (2)	1–4	Al-Tai (1)	Al Majma'ah
20:00	Al-Sadaan 25' (pen.)	Report	Hamad Ji 1', 12' (pen.), 44'; Al-Moghair 77'	Stadium: Prince Salman bin Abdulaziz Stadium; Referee: Khalil Al Ghamdi

27 February 2004 8	Al-Ansar (2)	0–3	Al-Shabab (1)	Medina
16:00		Report	Attram 17', 55'; Lindomar 78'	Stadium: Prince Mohammed bin Abdul Aziz Stadium; Referee: Omer Al Mehannah

27 February 2004 5	Al-Qadisiyah (1)	2–1	Al-Shoulla (1)	Dammam
20:00	Konaté 5'; Hakami 19'	Report	Atta 54' (pen.)	Stadium: Prince Mohamed bin Fahd Stadium; Referee: Mujeb Al-Dossari

27 February 2004 7	Al-Ahli (1)	5–1	Al-Wehda (1)	Jeddah
20:00	Al-Qadi 6'; Paulinho 45'; Rogério 82', 90' (pen.); Al-Shahrani 88'	Report	Al-Mor 83'	Stadium: Prince Abdullah Al Faisal Stadium; Referee: Nasser Al-Hamdan

28 February 2004 1	Al-Ittihad (1)	3–0	Al-Akhdoud (4)	Jeddah
20:15	Dimba 22'; Tcheco 31'; Gentil 42'	Report		Stadium: Prince Abdullah Al Faisal Stadium

29 February 2004 6	Al-Hilal (1)	7–1	Al-Nahda (3)	Riyadh
20:15	Al-Harbi 42', 44'; Ceesay 45+2', 57'; Traoré 51'; Al-Sheehan 88'; Al-Shareedah 90+2'	Report	Al-Ghawi 5'	Stadium: Prince Faisal bin Fahd Stadium

== Quarter-finals ==
The Quarter-finals fixtures were played on 4 and 5 March 2004. All times are local, AST (UTC+3).

4 March 2004 9	Al-Ettifaq (1)	0–1 (a.e.t.)	Al-Ittihad (1)	Dammam
20:00		Report	Al-Raheeb 104' (o.g.)	Stadium: Prince Mohamed bin Fahd Stadium; Referee: Nasser Al-Hamdan

4 March 2004 10	Al-Nassr (1)	4–0	Al-Tai (1)	Riyadh
20:00	Aboucherouane 12', 88'; El Nahhas 54'; Al-Janoubi 90+4' (pen.)	Report		Stadium: Prince Faisal bin Fahd Stadium; Referee: Abdulrahman Al-Amri

5 March 2004 11	Al-Qadisiyah (1)	0–1	Al-Hilal (1)	Dammam
20:00		Report	Ceesay 74'	Stadium: Prince Mohamed bin Fahd Stadium; Referee: Dhafer Abo Zanda

5 March 2004 12	Al-Shabab (1)	1–2	Al-Ahli (1)	Riyadh
20:00	Manga 8'	Report	Al-Meshal 34'; Rogério 45+1'	Stadium: Prince Faisal bin Fahd Stadium; Referee: Khalil Al Ghamdi

== Semi-finals ==
The Semi-finals first legs were played on 7 and 8 March 2004 while the second legs were played on 11 and 12 March 2006. All times are local, AST (UTC+3).

Team 1	Agg.	Team 2	1st leg	2nd leg
Al-Ittihad (1)	5–2	Al-Nassr (1)	3–1	2–1
Al-Hilal (1)	1–2	Al-Ahli (1)	1–2	0–0

=== Matches ===
7 March 2004
20:15

Al-Ittihad (1)	3–1	Al-Nassr (1)
Noor 23'; Tcheco 39'; Dimba 90+1' (pen.)	Report	Al-Bishi 3'

Prince Abdullah Al Faisal Stadium, Jeddah
Referee: Abdulrahman Al-Jarwan
11 March 2004
20:15

Al-Nassr (1)	1–2	Al-Ittihad (1)
Aboucherouane 45' (pen.)	Report	Tcheco 17'; Dimba 33'

King Fahd International Stadium, Riyadh
Referee: Ali Al-Mutlaq

Al-Ittihad won 5–2 on aggregate.

8 March 2004
20:15

Al-Ahli (1)	2–1	Al-Hilal (1)
Al-Meshal 10'; Al-Shahrani 89'	Report	Al-Mutairi 56'

Prince Abdullah Al Faisal Stadium, Jeddah
Referee: Ali Al-Mutlaq
12 March 2004
20:15

Al-Hilal (1)	0–0	Al-Ahli (1)
	Report

King Fahd International Stadium, Riyadh
Referee: Nasser Al-Hamdan

Al-Ahli won 2–1 on aggregate.

== Final ==
The 2004 Crown Prince Cup Final was played on 26 March 2004 at the King Fahd International Stadium in Riyadh between derby rivals Al-Ahli and Al-Ittihad. This was the fifth Crown Prince Cup final to be held at the stadium. Previously, the two sides met twice in the final, Al-Ahli won in 2002 while Al-Ittihad won in 1958. All times are local, AST (UTC+3).

26 March 2004
20:30

Al-Ittihad	1–0	Al-Ahli
Idris 58'	Report

King Fahd International Stadium, Riyadh
Referee: Lucílio Batista (Portugal)

== Top goalscorers ==
Rank	Player	Club	Goals
1	(Senegal) Hamad Ji	Al-Tai	3
1	(The Gambia) Jatto Ceesay	Al-Hilal	3
1	(Brazil) Tcheco	Al-Ittihad	3
1	(Brazil) Dimba	Al-Ittihad	3
1	(Morocco) Hicham Aboucherouane	Al-Nassr	3
6	(Ghana) Godwin Attram	Al-Shabab	2
6	(Brazil) Rogério	Al-Ahli	2
6	(Saudi Arabia) Ahmed Al-Harbi	Al-Hilal	2
6	(Saudi Arabia) Talal Al-Meshal	Al-Ahli	2
6	(Saudi Arabia) Ibrahim Al-Shahrani	Al-Ahli	2

== See also ==
- 2003–04 Saudi Premier League
- 2005 AFC Champions League
