= 2003–04 Iraqi Premier League =

Iraqi Premier League
- Season: 2003–04
- Champions: N/A (season cancelled)
- AFC Champions League: Al-Shorta; Al-Zawraa

The 2003–04 Iraqi Premier League kicked off on January 8, 2004. The name of the league was changed from Iraqi First Division League to Iraqi Premier League. Due to security issues and scheduling difficulties, the season was officially cancelled in June 2004 during the group stage.

The top four teams from each group were meant to advance to the elite stage, where they would be split into two groups of eight teams each, with the top two from each group advancing to the semi-finals, which would be followed by a third place match and a final. The champions and runners-up would qualify for the 2005 AFC Champions League and the third and fourth-placed teams would qualify for the 2004–05 Arab Champions League.

As the league was not completed, the Iraq Football Association (IFA) decided that a play-off would be held between the top four teams from the Central Groups to decide which two sides would qualify for the AFC Champions League, on the assumption that the leaders of the North and South Groups at the time of cancellation (Erbil and Al-Najaf) would be able to take part in the Arab Champions League along with Al-Talaba, who were specially invited to compete.

Al-Shorta and Al-Zawraa were the teams to qualify to the AFC Champions League, but no teams were admitted to the Arab Champions League after Iraq withdrew from the tournament following UAFA's decision to only let them have one participant in Al-Talaba.

== Name changes ==
- Al-Difaa Al-Jawi renamed to Al-Estiqlal.

== Group stage at abandonment ==
=== North Group ===
| Pos | Team | Pld | W | D | L | GF | GA | GD | Pts | PPG | ERB | MSL | ZAK | KIR | DUH | SUL | PRS |
|---|---|---|---|---|---|---|---|---|---|---|---|---|---|---|---|---|---|
| 1 | Erbil (Note: On the assumption that Iraq would be granted three slots for the 2004–05 Arab Champions League, the IFA planned to admit Erbil into the competition as leaders of the North Group. However, UAFA only allowed Iraq to have one participant, leading to Iraq withdrawing from the tournament.) | 10 | 6 | 3 | 1 | 19 | 8 | +11 | 21 | 2.10 | | 2–1 | 1–1 | 4–1 | 2–1 | 5–0 | 2–1 |
| 2 | Al-Mosul | 8 | 5 | 1 | 2 | 13 | 8 | +5 | 16 | 2.00 | 2–1 | | 3–0 | 2–2 | | 1–0 | 2–1 |
| 3 | Zakho | 10 | 4 | 3 | 3 | 11 | 9 | +2 | 15 | 1.50 | 1–2 | | | 1–0 | | 3–2 | 3–0 |
| 4 | Kirkuk | 10 | 4 | 3 | 3 | 8 | 10 | −2 | 15 | 1.50 | 0–0 | 1–0 | 0–0 | | 1–0 | 1–0 | 2–1 |
| 5 | Duhok | 7 | 4 | 0 | 3 | 10 | 6 | +4 | 12 | 1.71 | | | 1–0 | 2–0 | | 3–0 | 3–2 |
| 6 | Sulaymaniya | 9 | 2 | 0 | 7 | 6 | 17 | −11 | 6 | 0.67 | | 1–2 | 0–2 | | 1–0 | | 2–0 |
| 7 | Pires | 8 | 0 | 2 | 6 | 5 | 14 | −9 | 2 | 0.25 | 0–0 | | 0–0 | | | | |

Source: Goalzz

=== Central Group 1 ===
| Pos | Team | Pld | W | D | L | GF | GA | GD | Pts | PPG | Qualification | QWJ | SHR | KAR | EST | DIY | SAL |
|---|---|---|---|---|---|---|---|---|---|---|---|---|---|---|---|---|---|
| 1 | Al-Quwa Al-Jawiya | 6 | 6 | 0 | 0 | 13 | 0 | +13 | 18 | 3.00 | Additional play-offs | | | 2–0 | 1–0 | | 5–0 |
| 2 | Al-Shorta | 6 | 5 | 1 | 0 | 19 | 4 | +15 | 16 | 2.67 | Additional play-offs | | | 2–1 | | 7–1 | 2–1 |
| 3 | Al-Karkh | 8 | 4 | 1 | 3 | 12 | 11 | +1 | 13 | 1.63 | | | | | 2–2 | 2–0 | 2–0 |
| 4 | Al-Estiqlal | 8 | 3 | 1 | 4 | 11 | 15 | −4 | 10 | 1.25 | | 0–2 | 0–5 | 5–1 | | 2–4 | 1–0 |
| 5 | Diyala | 9 | 2 | 0 | 7 | 7 | 21 | −14 | 6 | 0.67 | | 0–2 | 0–2 | 0–2 | 0–1 | | 2–0 |
| 6 | Salahaddin | 9 | 1 | 1 | 7 | 5 | 16 | −11 | 4 | 0.44 | | 0–1 | 1–1 | 0–2 | | 3–0 | |

Source: Goalzz

=== Central Group 2 ===
| Pos | Team | Pld | W | D | L | GF | GA | GD | Pts | PPG | Qualification | NFT | JSH | TLB | SMR | SIN | ZWR |
|---|---|---|---|---|---|---|---|---|---|---|---|---|---|---|---|---|---|
| 1 | Al-Naft | 6 | 3 | 2 | 1 | 3 | 2 | +1 | 11 | 1.83 | Additional play-offs | | 1–0 | | 0–0 | 0–2 | |
| 2 | Al-Jaish | 7 | 3 | 1 | 3 | 11 | 11 | 0 | 10 | 1.43 | | 0–1 | | | 2–2 | 4–2 | 1–3 |
| 3 | Al-Talaba (Note: On the assumption that Iraq would be granted three slots for the 2004–05 Arab Champions League, the IFA planned to admit Al-Talaba into the competition after they were invited to compete by ART. However, UAFA only allowed Iraq to have one participant, leading to Iraq withdrawing from the tournament.) | 2 | 2 | 0 | 0 | 5 | 1 | +4 | 6 | 3.00 | | | | | | 2–0 | |
| 4 | Samarra | 5 | 1 | 3 | 1 | 5 | 5 | 0 | 6 | 1.20 | | 0–1 | | | | 1–0 | |
| 5 | Al-Sinaa | 8 | 1 | 2 | 5 | 9 | 15 | −6 | 5 | 0.63 | | 0–0 | 2–3 | 1–3 | 2–2 | | |
| 6 | Al-Zawraa | 2 | 1 | 0 | 1 | 3 | 2 | +1 | 3 | 1.50 | Additional play-offs | | 0–1 | | | | |

Source: Goalzz

=== South Group ===
| Pos | Team | Pld | W | D | L | GF | GA | GD | Pts | PPG | NJF | KRB | SMA | MIN | NAS | BSR |
|---|---|---|---|---|---|---|---|---|---|---|---|---|---|---|---|---|
| 1 | Al-Najaf (Note: On the assumption that Iraq would be granted three slots for the 2004–05 Arab Champions League, the IFA planned to admit Al-Najaf into the competition as leaders of the South Group. However, UAFA only allowed Iraq to have one participant, leading to Iraq withdrawing from the tournament.) | 7 | 6 | 0 | 1 | 13 | 4 | +9 | 18 | 2.57 | | 1–0 | | 3–0 | 3–1 | 2–0 |
| 2 | Karbala | 9 | 5 | 2 | 2 | 12 | 7 | +5 | 17 | 1.89 | | | 1–1 | 1–0 | 2–0 | 1–1 |
| 3 | Al-Samawa | 9 | 4 | 3 | 2 | 12 | 11 | +1 | 15 | 1.67 | 2–1 | 0–2 | | 0–0 | 2–1 | 1–0 |
| 4 | Al-Minaa | 7 | 3 | 2 | 2 | 3 | 4 | −1 | 11 | 1.57 | | 1–0 | 1–0 | | 1–0 | 0–0 |
| 5 | Al-Nasiriya | 8 | 1 | 0 | 7 | 8 | 15 | −7 | 3 | 0.38 | 0–1 | 2–3 | 2–3 | | | 2–0 |
| 6 | Al-Basra | 8 | 0 | 3 | 5 | 6 | 13 | −7 | 3 | 0.38 | 1–2 | 1–2 | 3–3 | | | |

Source: Goalzz

== Additional play-offs for AFC Champions League ==
| Al-Zawraa | w/o (Al-Naft withdrew) | Al-Naft |

Al-Zawraa qualified for the 2005 AFC Champions League.

22 September 2004

| Al-Shorta | 3–2 | Al-Quwa Al-Jawiya |
|---|---|---|
| A. Abdul-Hussein; T. Abdul-Hussein 46'; Ridha 65' | | Mohammed; Abdul-Wahid |

Franso Hariri Stadium, Erbil
24 September 2004

| Al-Quwa Al-Jawiya | 1–1 | Al-Shorta |
|---|---|---|
| Khudhair; Mohammed (red card) | | Ridha |

Franso Hariri Stadium, Erbil
Referee: Samir Shubaib

Al-Shorta won 4–3 on aggregate and qualified for the 2005 AFC Champions League.

== Season statistics ==
=== Hat-tricks ===
| Player | For | Against | Result | Date |
|---|---|---|---|---|
| (Iraq) Hashim Ridha | Al-Shorta | Diyala | 7–1 | 9 January 2004 |
| (Iraq) Hussein Abdullah | Erbil | Kirkuk | 4–1 | 10 May 2004 |
