= 1997 Saudi Crown Prince Cup =

1997 Crown Prince Cup
Tournament details
- Country: Saudi Arabia
- Dates: 24 April – 16 May 1997
- Teams: 16 (main competition)

Final positions
- Champions: Al-Ittihad (5th title)
- Runners-up: Al-Tai
- Asian Cup Winners' Cup: Al-Ittihad
- Arab Cup Winners' Cup: Al-Tai

Tournament statistics
- Matches played: 15
- Goals scored: 44 (2.93 per match)
- Top goal scorer(s): Saleh Al-Ganbar; Yahya Jako (3 goals each)

The 1997 Crown Prince Cup was the 22nd season of the Saudi premier football knockout tournament since its establishment in 1957. The main competition started on 24 April and concluded with the final on 16 May 1997.

Al-Shabab were the defending champions; however, they were eliminated in the quarter-finals by Al-Tai.

In the final, Al-Ittihad defeated Al-Tai 2–0 to secure their record-extending fifth title. The final was held at the Youth Welfare Stadium in Jeddah. As winners of the tournament, Al-Ittihad qualified for the 1998–99 Asian Cup Winners' Cup. As runners-up, Al-Tai qualified for the 1998 Arab Cup Winners' Cup.

== Qualifying rounds ==
All of the competing teams that are not members of the Premier League competed in the qualifying rounds to secure one of 4 available places in the Round of 16. First Division sides Al-Jabalain and Al-Khaleej and Second Division sides Al-Akhdoud and Al-Hamadah qualified.

== Bracket ==
Round of 16
H	Al-Ansar	0
A	Al-Riyadh (asdet)	1
H	Al-Ittihad	3
A	Al-Najma	1
H	Al-Hilal	2
A	Al-Nassr	1
H	Al-Akhdoud	1
A	Al-Wehda	4
H	Al-Jabalain	2
A	Al-Qadisiyah	3
A	Al-Ahli	2
H	Al-Khaleej	0
A	Al-Shabab	2
H	Al-Ettifaq	0
A	Al-Tai	3
H	Al-Hamadah	1

Quarter-finals
A	Al-Riyadh	2
H	Al-Ittihad	3
A	Al-Hilal	2
H	Al-Wehda	0
H	Al-Qadisiyah	1
A	Al-Ahli	3
H	Al-Shabab	2 (3)
A	Al-Tai (pen.)	2 (5)

Semi-finals
H	Al-Ittihad (pen.)	0 (4)
A	Al-Hilal	0 (1)
H	Al-Ahli	0
A	Al-Tai	1

Final
–	Al-Ittihad	2
–	Al-Tai	0

== Round of 16 ==
The draw for the Round of 16 was held on 5 April 1997. The Round of 16 fixtures were played on 24 & 25 April 1997. All times are local, AST (UTC+3).

24 April 1997 3	Al-Akhdoud (3)	1–4	Al-Wehda (1)	Najran
15:45	Awidhah 36'	Report	Al-Dosari 25'; Admawi 60'; Al-Barakati 65'; Al-Qarni 72'	Stadium: Al Akhdoud Club Stadium; Referee: Mohammed Al-Beshri

24 April 1997 4	Al-Ansar (1)	0–1 (a.e.t.)	Al-Riyadh (1)	Medina
15:45		Report	Al-Obaid 110'	Stadium: Prince Mohammed bin Abdul Aziz Stadium; Referee: Mohammed Al-Suwail

24 April 1997 5	Al-Jabalain (2)	2–3	Al-Qadisiyah (1)	Ha'il
15:45	Mordhy 19' (pen.), 40' (pen.)	Report	Al-Ganbar 9', 10', 64'	Stadium: Prince Abdul Aziz bin Musa'ed Stadium; Referee: Dhafer Abo Zanda

24 April 1997 1	Al-Hamadah (3)	1–3	Al-Tai (1)	Riyadh
20:30	Al-Shamaan 16'	Report	M. Al-Saqri 10'; Jako 24'; Sow 53'	Stadium: Youth Welfare Stadium in Al-Malaz; Referee: Hussain Al-Maghamsi

24 April 1997 2	Al-Ettifaq (1)	0–2	Al-Shabab (1)	Khobar
20:30		Report	Anwar 51'; Rokbi 66'	Stadium: Prince Saud bin Jalawi Stadium; Referee: Abdulaziz Al-Dakheel

24 April 1997 8	Al-Ittihad (1)	3–1	Al-Najma (1)	Jeddah
20:30	Al-Khilaiwi 32'; Al-Khatib 36'; Al-Shamrani 70'	Report	Kwakye 83'	Stadium: Youth Welfare Stadium; Referee: Mutlaq Al-Saad

25 April 1997 7	Al-Hilal (1)	2–1	Al-Nassr (1)	Riyadh
20:30	Al-Jaber 50'; Al-Thunayan 62'	Report	Al-Showaie 52'	Stadium: King Fahd International Stadium; Referee: Yousef Al-Aqili

25 April 1997 6	Al-Khaleej (2)	0–2	Al-Ahli (1)	Khobar
20:30		Report	Al-Meshal 7' (pen.); Antônio 86'	Stadium: Prince Saud bin Jalawi Stadium; Referee: Ibrahim Al-Nafisah

== Quarter-finals ==
The draw for the Quarter-finals was held on 26 April 1997. The Quarter-finals fixtures were played on 1 & 2 May 1997. All times are local, AST (UTC+3).

1 May 1997 10	Al-Shabab (1)	2–2 (3–5 p)	Al-Tai (1)	Riyadh
20:15	Batista 70'; Anwar 74'	Report	Jako 10'; Sow 44'	Stadium: Youth Welfare Stadium in Al-Malaz; Referee: Omer Al Mehannah
	Penalties
	Al-Anazi (penalty scored); Al-Shenaif (penalty scored); Batista (penalty scored); Al-Dawod (penalty missed)		(penalty scored) Jako; (penalty scored) Al-Gablan; (penalty scored) Sow; (penalty scored) W. Al-Saqri; (penalty scored) Al-Deayea

1 May 1997 11	Al-Wehda (1)	0–2	Al-Hilal (1)	Mecca
20:45		Report	Al-Temawi 14'; Al-Jaber 77'	Stadium: King Abdul Aziz Stadium; Attendance: 20,000

2 May 1997 12	Al-Qadisiyah (1)	1–3	Al-Ahli (1)	Khobar
20:45	Faye 35'	Report	Al-Shahrani 17', 89'; Masaad 58' (pen.)	Stadium: Prince Saud bin Jalawi Stadium; Referee: Abdulaziz Al-Sulaiman

2 May 1997 9	Al-Ittihad (1)	3–2	Al-Riyadh (1)	Jeddah
20:45	Al-Khatib 26'; Kamatcho 62'; Bahja 88'	Report	Ammouta 60'; Al-Obaid 75'	Stadium: Youth Welfare Stadium; Attendance: 18,106; Referee: Ibrahim Al-Omar

== Semi-finals ==
The draw for the Semi-finals was held on 3 May 1997. The Semi-finals fixtures were played on 8 & 9 May 1997. All times are local, AST (UTC+3).

8 May 1997 13	Al-Ahli (1)	0–1	Al-Tai (1)	Jeddah
20:45		Report	Jako 13'	Stadium: Youth Welfare Stadium; Referee: Abdul Rahman Al-Zaid

9 May 1997 14	Al-Ittihad (1)	0–0 (a.e.t.) (4–1 p)	Al-Hilal (1)	Jeddah
20:45		Report		Stadium: Youth Welfare Stadium; Referee: Abdulaziz Al-Dakheel
	Penalties
	Kamatcho (penalty scored); Jamil (penalty scored); Al-Qarni (penalty scored); Bahja (penalty scored)		(penalty scored) Al-Thunayan; (penalty missed) Al-Jamaan; (penalty missed) Al-Temyat

== Final ==
The 1997 Crown Prince Cup Final was played on 16 May 1997 at the Youth Welfare Stadium in Jeddah between Al-Ittihad and Al-Tai. This was the fifth Crown Prince Cup final to be held at the stadium. This was Al-Ittihad's seventh final and Al-Tai's first final. All times are local, AST (UTC+3).

16 May 1997
20:50

Al-Ittihad	2–0	Al-Tai
Swayed 66'; Kamatcho 76'	Report

Youth Welfare Stadium, Jeddah
Referee: Nasser Al-Hamdan

== Top goalscorers ==
Rank	Player	Club	Goals
1	(Saudi Arabia) Saleh Al-Ganbar	Al-Qadisiyah	3
1	(Nigeria) Yahya Jako	Al-Tai	3
3	(Saudi Arabia) Fahad Mordhy Al-Shammari	Al-Jabalain	2
3	(Senegal) Mamadou Sow	Al-Tai	2
3	(Saudi Arabia) Fuad Anwar	Al-Shabab	2
3	(Saudi Arabia) Sami Al-Jaber	Al-Hilal	2
3	(Saudi Arabia) Ibrahim Al-Shahrani	Al-Ahli	2
3	(Saudi Arabia) Abdulmohsen Al-Obaid	Al-Riyadh	2
3	(Morocco) Kamatcho	Al-Ittihad	2
