= 2005 AFC Champions League =

24th edition of premier club football tournament organized by the AFC

Tournament details
- Dates: 8 March - 5 November 2005
- Teams: 29

Final positions
- Champions: (Saudi Arabia) Al-Ittihad (2nd title)
- Runners-up: (United Arab Emirates) Al Ain

Tournament statistics
- Matches played: 98
- Goals scored: 286 (2.92 per match)
- Top scorer(s): Mohammed Kallon (6 goals)
- Best player: Mohammed Noor

The 2005 AFC Champions League was the 24th edition of the top-level Asian club football tournament and the 3rd edition under the current AFC Champions League title. The championship was retained by the Saudi Arabian club Al-Ittihad with a 5–3 aggregate victory over Al Ain from the United Arab Emirates. Following a 1–1 draw at the Tahnoun bin Mohammed Stadium in Al Ain in the first leg, Al-Ittihad recorded a 4–2 victory at the Prince Abdullah Al Faisal Stadium in Jeddah to lift the trophy for the second consecutive season. They also qualified for the 2005 FIFA Club World Cup.

== Format ==
Group Stage

A total of 28 clubs were divided into 7 groups of four, based on region i.e. East Asian and Southeast Asian clubs were drawn in groups E to G, while the rest were grouped in groups A to D. Each club played double round-robin (home and away) against fellow three group members, a total of 6 matches each. Clubs received 3pts for a win, 1pt for a tie, 0pts for a loss. The clubs were ranked according to points and tie breakers were in the following order:

- Points earned between the clubs in question
- Goal Differential between the clubs in question
- Goals For between the clubs in question
- Points earned within the group
- Goal Differential within the group
- Goals For within the group

The seven group winners along with the defending champion advanced to the quarter-finals.

Knockout Round

All 8 clubs were randomly matched; however, the only restriction was that the clubs from the same country could not face each other in the quarter-finals. The games were conducted in 2 legs, home and away, and the aggregate score decided the match winner. If the aggregate score couldn't produce a winner, "away goals rule" was used. If still tied, clubs played extra time, where "away goals rule" still applied. If still tied, the game went to penalties.

== Teams ==
Syria were promoted to 'mature' status (after both their representatives had reached the 2004 AFC Cup final) while Bahrain were excluded from AFC competitions for 2005 following the withdrawal of both their Champions' League entrants in 2004.

=== Qualified Teams ===
West Asia		East Asia	
Quarter Finals
Team	Qualifying method	Team	Qualifying method
(Saudi Arabia) Al-Ittihad	Defending champions		
Group Stage
Team	Qualifying method	Team	Qualifying method
(Iran) PAS Tehran	2003–04 Iran Pro League champions	(China) Shenzhen Jianlibao	2004 Chinese Super League champions
(Iran) Sepahan	2003–04 Hazfi Cup winners	(China) Shandong Luneng Taishan	2004 Chinese FA Cup winners
(Iraq) Al-Zawraa	2003–04 Iraqi Premier League Central Group 1 play-off winner	(Indonesia) Persebaya Surabaya	2004 Liga Indonesia Premier Division champions
(Iraq) Al-Shorta	2003–04 Iraqi Premier League Central Group 2 play-off winner	(Indonesia) PSM Makassar	2004 Liga Indonesia Premier Division runners-up
(Kuwait) Al-Salmiya	2003–04 Kuwaiti Premier League runners-up	(Japan) Yokohama F. Marinos	2004 J.League Division 1 champions
Kuwait SC	2004 Kuwait Emir Cup runners-up	(Japan) Júbilo Iwata	2003 Emperor's Cup winners
(Qatar) Al Sadd	2003–04 Qatar Stars League champions	(South Korea) Suwon Samsung Bluewings	2004 K League champions
(Qatar) Al-Rayyan	2003–04 Emir of Qatar Cup winners	(South Korea) Busan IPark	2004 Korean FA Cup winners
(Saudi Arabia) Al Shabab	2003–04 Saudi Premier League champions	(Thailand) Krung Thai Bank	2003–04 Thai League champions
(Saudi Arabia) Al Ahli	2004 Saudi Crown Prince Cup runners-up	(Thailand) BEC-Tero Sasana	2003–04 Thai League runners-up
(Syria) Al-Wahda	2003–04 Syrian Premier League champions	(Vietnam) Hoang Anh Gia Lai	2004 V-League champions
(Syria) Al-Jaish	2003–04 Syrian Cup winners	(Vietnam) Binh Dinh	2004 Vietnamese Cup winners
(United Arab Emirates) Al Ain	2003–04 UAE Football League champions		
(United Arab Emirates) Al-Ahli	2003–04 UAE President's Cup winners		
(Uzbekistan) Pakhtakor	2004 Uzbek League champions & 2004 Uzbekistan Cup winners		
(Uzbekistan) Neftchi Fergana	2004 Uzbek League runners-up		

Notes

1. Iraq (IRQ): Due to security issues and scheduling difficulties, the 2003–04 Iraqi Premier League season was cancelled in June 2004 during the group stage. The Iraq Football Association decided that play-offs would be held between the top two teams from each Central Group at the time of cancellation (not including Al-Talaba who had initially been invited to participate in the Arab Champions League) to determine which clubs would qualify for the AFC Champions League. The play-offs were won by Al-Zawraa and Al-Shorta respectively.
2. Kuwait (KUW): Al-Qadsia were champions of the 2003–04 Kuwaiti Premier League and winners of the 2004 Kuwait Emir Cup but were banned from competing in all AFC competitions after Kuwaiti security personnel assaulted Al Sadd players following a match in last year's competition.
3. Saudi Arabia (KSA): 2004 Saudi Crown Prince Cup winners, Al-Ittihad, had already qualified for the AFC Champions League as reigning champions.

== Group stage ==
=== Group A ===
Team	Pld	W	D	L	GF	GA	GD	Pts
(Iran) PAS	6	5	1	0	12	4	+8	16
(Kuwait) Al Salmiya	6	3	0	3	8	9	−1	9
(Qatar) Al Rayyan	6	2	1	3	6	7	−1	7
(Iraq) Al Shorta	6	0	2	4	2	8	−6	2

9 March 2005

PAS	2–1	Al Rayyan

9 March 2005

Al Salmiya	3–1	Al Shorta

15 March 2005

Al Shorta	1–1	PAS

16 March 2005

Al Rayyan	2–1	Al Salmiya

6 April 2005

Al Rayyan	2–0	Al Shorta

6 April 2005

PAS	5–1	Al Salmiya

19 April 2005

Al Shorta	0–0	Al Rayyan

20 April 2005

Al Salmiya	0–1	PAS

10 May 2005

Al Shorta	0–1	Al Salmiya

11 May 2005

Al Rayyan	1–2	PAS

25 May 2005

PAS	1–0	Al Shorta

25 May 2005

Al Salmiya	2–0	Al Rayyan

=== Group B ===
Team	Pld	W	D	L	GF	GA	GD	Pts
(United Arab Emirates) Al Ain	6	4	1	1	13	6	+7	13
(Iran) Sepahan	6	3	2	1	10	6	+4	11
(Saudi Arabia) Al Shabab	6	3	1	2	7	7	0	10
(Syria) Al Wahda	6	0	0	6	5	16	−11	0

Source: afcchampionsleague.com
9 March 2005

Al Ain	3–0	Al Wahda

9 March 2005

Al Shabab	1–1	Sepahan

16 March 2005

Al Wahda	1–2	Al Shabab

16 March 2005

Sepahan	1–1	Al Ain

6 April 2005

Al Wahda	1–3	Sepahan

6 April 2005

Al Ain	3–0	Al Shabab

20 April 2005

Al Shabab	1–0	Al Ain

20 April 2005

Sepahan	2–0	Al Wahda

11 May 2005

Al Wahda	2–3	Al Ain

11 May 2005

Sepahan	1–0	Al Shabab

25 May 2005

Al Ain	3–2	Sepahan

25 May 2005

Al Shabab	3–1	Al Wahda

=== Group C ===
Team	Pld	W	D	L	GF	GA	GD	Pts
(Qatar) Al Sadd	6	4	0	2	8	6	+2	12
(Uzbekistan) Neftchi	6	3	0	3	8	7	+1	9
Al Kuwait	6	2	1	3	5	6	−1	7
(United Arab Emirates) Al-Ahli	6	2	1	3	8	10	−2	7

9 March 2005

Neftchi	1–0	Al Kuwait

9 March 2005

Al Sadd	2–0	Al-Ahli

16 March 2005

Al Kuwait	0–1	Al Sadd

16 March 2005

Al-Ahli	3–0	Neftchi

6 April 2005

Neftchi	2–0	Al Sadd

6 April 2005

Al Kuwait	1–0	Al-Ahli

20 April 2005

Al-Ahli	3–3	Al Kuwait

20 April 2005

Al Sadd	3–2	Neftchi

11 May 2005

Al Kuwait	1–0	Neftchi

11 May 2005

Al-Ahli	2–1	Al Sadd

25 May 2005

Neftchi	3–0 (Note: awarded 3–0 to Neftchi because Al-Ahli failed to show up.)	Al-Ahli

25 May 2005

Al Sadd	1–0	Al Kuwait

=== Group D ===
Team	Pld	W	D	L	GF	GA	GD	Pts
(Saudi Arabia) Al-Ahli	6	5	0	1	18	5	+13	15
(Uzbekistan) Pakhtakor	6	3	0	3	9	8	+1	9
(Iraq) Al-Zawra	6	2	1	3	6	13	−7	7
(Syria) Al-Jaish	6	1	1	4	7	14	−7	4

8 March 2005

Al-Zawra	1–2	Al-Ahli

9 March 2005

Al-Jaish	0–2	Pakhtakor

16 March 2005

Al-Ahli	3–1	Al-Jaish

16 March 2005

Pakhtakor	1–2	Al-Zawra

5 April 2005

Al-Zawra	1–5	Al-Jaish

6 April 2005

Al-Ahli	3–0	Pakhtakor

20 April 2005

Pakhtakor	2–1	Al-Ahli

20 April 2005

Al-Jaish	0–0	Al-Zawra

11 May 2005

Al-Ahli	5–1	Al-Zawra

11 May 2005

Pakhtakor	4–1	Al-Jaish

24 May 2005

Al-Zawra	1–0	Pakhtakor

25 May 2005

Al-Jaish	0–4	Al-Ahli

=== Group E ===
Team	Pld	W	D	L	GF	GA	GD	Pts
(China) Shenzhen Jianlibao	6	4	1	1	9	3	+6	13
(South Korea) Suwon Samsung Bluewings	6	4	1	1	14	3	+11	13
(Japan) Jubilo Iwata	6	3	0	3	11	4	+7	9
(Vietnam) Hoang Anh Gia Lai	6	0	0	6	1	25	−24	0

9 March 2005

Shenzhen Jianlibao	1–0	Jubilo Iwata

9 March 2005

Hoang Anh Gia Lai	1–5	Suwon Samsung Bluewings

16 March 2005

Jubilo Iwata	6–0	Hoang Anh Gia Lai

16 March 2005

Suwon Samsung Bluewings	0–0	Shenzhen Jianlibao

6 April 2005

Shenzhen Jianlibao	5–0	Hoang Anh Gia Lai

6 April 2005

Jubilo Iwata	0–1	Suwon Samsung Bluewings

20 April 2005

Suwon Samsung Bluewings	2–1	Jubilo Iwata

20 April 2005

Hoang Anh Gia Lai	0–2	Shenzhen Jianlibao

11 May 2005

Jubilo Iwata	3–0	Shenzhen Jianlibao

11 May 2005

Suwon Samsung Bluewings	6–0	Hoang Anh Gia Lai

25 May 2005

Shenzhen Jianlibao	1–0	Suwon Samsung Bluewings

25 May 2005

Hoang Anh Gia Lai	0–1	Jubilo Iwata

=== Group F ===
Team	Pld	W	D	L	GF	GA	GD	Pts
(China) Shandong Luneng Taishan	6	6	0	0	15	2	+13	18
(Japan) Yokohama F. Marinos	6	4	0	2	10	4	+6	12
(Indonesia) PSM Makassar	6	1	1	4	4	14	−10	4
(Thailand) BEC Tero	6	0	1	5	3	12	−9	1

9 March 2005

BEC Tero	0–1	PSM Makassar

9 March 2005

Yokohama F. Marinos	0–1	Shandong Luneng Taishan

16 March 2005

PSM Makassar	0–2	Yokohama F. Marinos

16 March 2005

Shandong Luneng Taishan	1–0	BEC Tero

6 April 2005

PSM Makassar	0–1	Shandong Luneng Taishan

6 April 2005

BEC Tero	1–2	Yokohama F. Marinos

20 April 2005

Shandong Luneng Taishan	6–1	PSM Makassar

20 April 2005

Yokohama F. Marinos	2–0	BEC Tero

11 May 2005

PSM Makassar	2–2	BEC Tero

11 May 2005

Shandong Luneng Taishan	2–1	Yokohama F. Marinos

25 May 2005

BEC Tero	0–4	Shandong Luneng Taishan

25 May 2005

Yokohama F. Marinos	3–0	PSM Makassar

=== Group G ===
Team	Pld	W	D	L	GF	GA	GD	Pts
(South Korea) Busan IPark	6	6	0	0	25	0	+25	18
(Thailand) Krung Thai	6	3	0	3	5	9	−4	9
(Indonesia) Persebaya	6	1	1	4	2	10	−8	4
(Vietnam) Binh Dinh	6	1	1	4	2	15	−13	4

9 March 2005

Busan IPark	8–0	Binh Dinh

9 March 2005

Persebaya	1–2	Krung Thai

16 March 2005

Binh Dinh	0–0	Persebaya

16 March 2005

Krung Thai	0–2	Busan IPark

6 April 2005

Binh Dinh	1–2	Krung Thai

6 April 2005

Busan IPark	4–0	Persebaya

20 April 2005

Krung Thai	0–1	Binh Dinh

20 April 2005

Persebaya	0–3	Busan IPark

11 May 2005

Binh Dinh	0–4	Busan IPark

11 May 2005

Krung Thai	1–0	Persebaya

25 May 2005

Busan IPark	4–0	Krung Thai

25 May 2005

Persebaya	1–0	Binh Dinh

== Knock-out stage ==
=== Bracket ===
Quarter finals
(United Arab Emirates) Al Ain (a)	1	3	4
(Iran) PAS	1	3	4
(Saudi Arabia) Al-Ahli	2	1	3
(China) Shenzhen Jianlibao (a.e.t.)	1	3	4
(South Korea) Busan IPark	3	2	5
(Qatar) Al Sadd	0	1	1
(China) Shandong Luneng Taishan	1	2	3
(Saudi Arabia) Al-Ittihad	1	7	8

Semi-finals
(United Arab Emirates) Al Ain	6	0	6
(China) Shenzhen Jianlibao	0	0	0
(South Korea) Busan IPark	0	0	0
(Saudi Arabia) Al-Ittihad	5	2	7

Final
(United Arab Emirates) Al Ain	1	2	3
(Saudi Arabia) Al-Ittihad	1	4	5

=== Quarter-finals ===
Team 1	Agg.	Team 2	1st leg	2nd leg
Busan IPark (South Korea)	5–1	(Qatar) Al Sadd	3–0	2–1
Shandong Luneng Taishan (China)	3–8	(Saudi Arabia) Al-Ittihad (2004 Champion)	1–1	2–7
Al Ain (United Arab Emirates)	4–4 (a)	(Iran) PAS	1–1	3–3
Al-Ahli (Saudi Arabia)	3–4	(China) Shenzhen Jianlibao	2–1	1–3 (a.e.t.)

==== First leg ====
14 September 2005

Busan IPark (South Korea)	3–0	(Qatar) Al Sadd
Da Silva 20', 88'; Yoon Hee-joon 90'

Busan Asiad Stadium, Busan

14 September 2005

Shandong Luneng Taishan (China)	1–1	(Saudi Arabia) Al-Ittihad
Li Xiaopeng 54'		Noor 48'

Shandong Provincial Stadium, Jinan

14 September 2005

Al Ain (United Arab Emirates)	1–1	(Iran) PAS
Nosrati 42' (o.g.)		Borhani 24'

Tahnoun Bin Mohamed Stadium, Al Ain

14 September 2005

Al-Ahli (Saudi Arabia)	2–1	(China) Shenzhen Jianlibao
Rogerio 63'; Al-Gizani 87'		Naif Al-Qadi 76' (o.g.)

Prince Abdullah al-Faisal Stadium, Jeddah

==== Second leg ====
21 September 2005

Shenzhen Jianlibao (China)	3–1 (a.e.t.)	(Saudi Arabia) Al-Ahli
Zając 6'; Li Yi 15', 98'		Abdulghani 20'

Shenzhen Stadium, Shenzhen

Shenzhen Jianlibao won 4–3 on aggregate.

21 September 2005

PAS (Iran)	3–3	(United Arab Emirates) Al Ain
Borhani 34', 47'; Traoré 75'		Tejada 61' (pen.); Saeed 83', 84'

Shahid Dastgerdi Stadium, Tehran

4–4 on aggregate, Al Ain won on away goals.

21 September 2005

Al Sadd (Qatar)	1–2	(South Korea) Busan IPark
Emerson 90+2'		Lim Kwan-sik 21'; Han Jae-woong 79'

Jassim Bin Hamad Stadium, Doha

Busan IPark won 5–1 on aggregate.

21 September 2005

Al-Ittihad (Saudi Arabia)	7–2	(China) Shandong Luneng Taishan
Osama 18'; Tcheco 34'; Swayed 56'; Kallon 66'; Abushgeer 78', 89'; Tukar 80'		Li Xiaopeng 16'; Cui Peng 61'

Prince Abdullah al-Faisal Stadium, Jeddah

Al-Ittihad won 8–3 on aggregate.

=== Semi-finals ===
Team 1	Agg.	Team 2	1st leg	2nd leg
Busan IPark (South Korea)	0–7	(Saudi Arabia) Al-Ittihad	0–5	0–2
Al Ain (United Arab Emirates)	6–0	(China) Shenzhen Jianlibao	6–0	0–0

==== First leg ====
28 September 2005

Busan IPark (South Korea)	0–5	(Saudi Arabia) Al-Ittihad
		Al-Otaibi 54'; Kallon 61'; Tcheco 63'; Kariri 85'; Idris 88'

Busan Asiad Stadium, Busan

28 September 2005

Al Ain (United Arab Emirates)	6–0	(China) Shenzhen Jianlibao
Khater 5', 80'; Nwoha 9', 21', 77'; Shehab Ahmed 28'

Tahnoun Bin Mohamed Stadium, Al Ain

==== Second leg ====
12 October 2005

Shenzhen Jianlibao (China)	0–0	(United Arab Emirates) Al Ain

Shenzhen Stadium, Shenzhen

Al Ain won 6–0 on aggregate.

12 October 2005

Al-Ittihad (Saudi Arabia)	2–0	(South Korea) Busan IPark
Kallon 18', 58'

Prince Abdullah al-Faisal Stadium, Jeddah

Al-Ittihad won 7–0 on aggregate.

=== Final ===
Team 1	Agg.	Team 2	1st leg	2nd leg
Al Ain (United Arab Emirates)	3–5	(Saudi Arabia) Al-Ittihad	1–1	2–4

==== First leg ====
26 October 2005

Al Ain (United Arab Emirates)	1–1	(Saudi Arabia) Al-Ittihad
Ali Msarri 51'		Kallon 86' (pen.)

Tahnoun bin Mohammed Stadium, Al Ain

==== Second leg ====
5 November 2005

Al-Ittihad (Saudi Arabia)	4–2	(United Arab Emirates) Al Ain
Kallon 2'; Noor 33'; Job 56'; Al-Dokhi 67'		Shehab Ahmed 55' (pen.); Tejada 90+1'

Prince Abdullah Al Faisal Stadium, Jeddah

Al-Ittihad won 5–3 on aggregate.

== See also ==
- 2005 FIFA Club World Championship
