= Al-Ittihad Club (Jeddah) =

Association football club in Saudi Arabia

Al-Ittihad
- Full name: Al-Ittihad Saudi Football Club
- Nicknames: List: ITTI (Nickname); Al-Amid (The Chief); Al-Mundiali (The Mundial); Al-Numour (The Tigers); Nadi Al-Sha'ab (The People's Club); Nadi Al-Watan (The Nation's Club)
- Founded: December 26, 1927; 98 years ago
- Ground: King Abdullah Sports City Stadium; Prince Abdullah Al-Faisal Sports City Stadium
- Capacity: 66,345; 27,000
- Owner(s): Public Investment Fund (100%); Ittihad
- Chairman: Fahd bin Hamza Sindi
- Head coach: Jens Wissing
- League: Saudi Pro League
- 2025–26: Pro League, 5th of 18
- Website: www.ittihadclub.sa/en
Home colours	Away colours

Al-Ittihad Club, commonly known as Al-Ittihad, or simply Ittihad (Arabic: نادي الاتحاد), is a Saudi Arabian professional association football club based in Jeddah, Saudi Arabia. Founded in 1927, the club competes in the Saudi Pro League, the top tier of football in Saudi Arabia, and is one of three clubs to have spent its entire history in the top flight without ever being relegated.

Ittihad matches are played at Jeddah's main stadium King Abdullah Sports City, which is the second-largest stadium in Saudi Arabia, accommodating 66,345 spectators. Al-Ittihad has a long-standing rivalry with Al-Hilal, which is referred to as Saudi El Clasico, and is considered the most prominent and most watched annual match.

Founded in 1927, it is the oldest sports club still surviving in Saudi Arabia. The most successful period in the club history was the 1990s and the 2000s, when the club achieved a large number of titles and achievements domestically, regionally, and globally, culminating in the club securing the 4th place in the 2005 FIFA Club World Championship.

Ittihad is one of the most successful Asian club at domestic and continental level, as they have achieved the AFC Champions League Elite title twice in a row (the first to do so), the Asian Cup Winners' Cup, the GCC Champions League and the Arab Champions League title each once. Domestically, Ittihad is also one of two successful clubs in Saudi Arabia, having won fourteen league titles, six King's Cup titles, eight Crown Prince Cup titles, three Saudi Federation Cup titles and one Saudi Super Cup.

== History ==
=== Creation (1927–1949) ===
The club was founded after a meeting of some of the notable football enthusiasts of the city of Jeddah, on 26 December 1927. (Note: Some sources also state that the club was created on 4 January.) They met in the offices of a radio broadcasting company and discussed the idea of forming a football club to compete with various travelling teams and be a source of entertainment for inhabitants and an outlet for the city's youth to practice organised sport. Everyone agreed that they should create the team that unites them and Ittihad Jeddah was born. The attendees were Hamza Fitaihi, Abdulrazag Ajlan, Abdullah Bin Zagor, Fahad Badkook, Abdulsamad Najeeb Alsaady, Ismail Zahran, Ali Yamani, Abdulaziz Jameel, Abdul Latif Jameel, Abdulateef Linjawi, Othman Banajah, Ahmad Abu Talib, Ali Sultan, Ahmed Almir and Saleh Salamah.

As long as we are here together, let's call it Ittihad — Mazen Mohammed

The name of the club was quoted from this wisdom, Mazen Mohammed words which created the current club name. Club owners agree with him to put the club name Ittihad (United or Union, jointly) in Arabic.

Ali Sultan became the first official president of the club. Ittihad did not find at first a strong support, there wasn't an official clubs (communities) such as Al Riyadhi, because the presence of powerful culture in the city of Jeddah only. In their first meeting with Al-Riyadhi, Ittihad make it victory with 3–0 won. The club has achieved a historic first tournament, which was called The Cup of Nishan Nazer, counted as an official tournament at the time, The cup have formed a popularity of Ittihad, Because of a challenge between them in the final. Depending on the narrator, the winner can burn the Embassy wood's. The Championship attended by several of the clubs, communities, was fought by Ittihad where several games had to be won to achieve access to the final against Al-Mukhtalat. The weather was dust, did not complete the first half, the match was stopped about 10 minutes. the referee stopped the game to rest for 8 minutes, the weather was changed for the better with the second half, Al-Mukhtalat squad had led to fail, it was a low attacking level. The most prominent player in the game is the club's defender Safwan which was sacrificed for his team. the club won the championship by 3–0 against Al-Mukhtalat. The most important characteristic of this tournament is the first sporting event held in the reign of the founder King Abdul-Aziz Al-Saud The period of 1940 to 1950 remained difficult, as the Football Association was not established until 1956.

=== The Start of The Official Tournaments, The First League Title, The Treble (1950–1999) ===
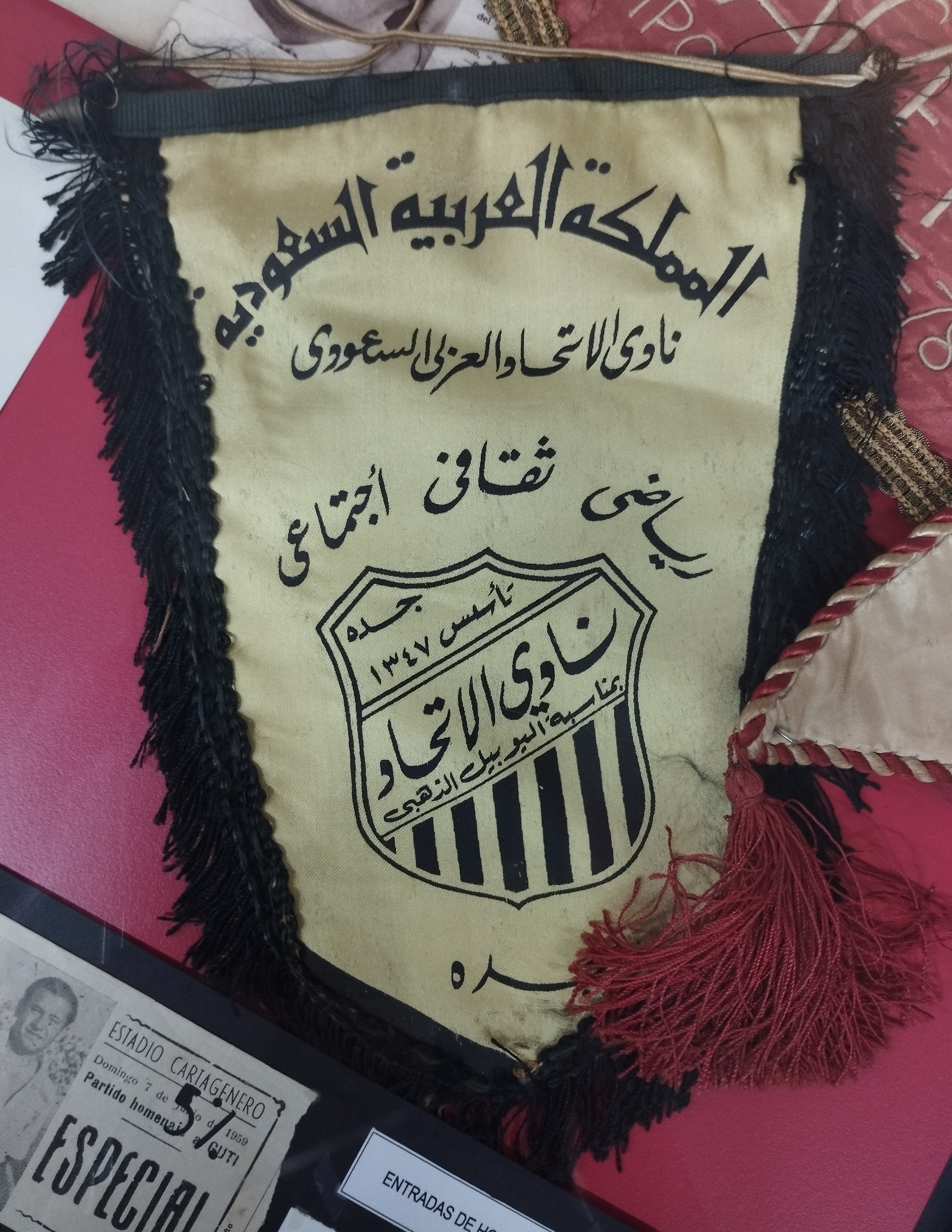
An Ittihad pennant presented to Cartagena FC on the occasion of the invitation extended to the Saudi club for the 1978 Carabela de Plata tournament. Historia del fútbol en Cartagena exhibition (2025).

In late 1950s, it is considered as the first club to achieve both the Crown Prince Cup and the King's Cup for two consecutive times. On 2 May 1960, Ittihad faced their traditional rivals Al-Ahli in the King's Cup, which ended with a big 7–0 victory, which is the largest victory in the derby. The tournament ended and the club became champions for the third time in a row over Al-Wehda, which completed the 1958, 1959, and 1960 series. The club went through its worst period since its founding, after winning the King's Cup in 1967, with the exception of achieving the Saudi Association Cup in 1974, after defeating Al-Hilal on penalties. In the following decade, the Saudi Pro League and the First Division were merged due to the many matches of the national team in 1982, which Ittihad won its first league title in its history, which is the first and only club to achieve it. After an absence for 21 years, the club won the King's Cup after defeating Al Ettifaq in 1988.

In mid 1990s, Which is considered as the beginning of the golden age of the club, where a numerous of titles were achieved. In 1996–97, the club delivered a cup treble, winning the Premier League, Crown Prince Cup, and Federation Cup. After two seasons, the club won the league title for the third time in its history after eliminating rivals Al-Hilal in the final 2–0. The first continental championship was also achieved after winning 3–2 over Jeonnam Dragons with a golden goal, scored by Ahmed Bahja. GCC Champions League was also achieved, as the season ended with winning four trophies. In 1999, The club was a runner-up in the Asian Super Cup, after losing 2–3 on aggregate to Júbilo Iwata.

=== New Century, A Miracle, Two Champions League Titles (2000–2010) ===
With the beginning of the new century during the period of president Ahmed Masoud, which is considered one of the most successful periods, winning 8 titles within 3 years. The 1999–2000 league season was achieved at the beginning of the century, after a 3–1 win over Al-Ahli in the final, also, Hamza Idris scored an unprecedented 33 goals, a record in that period, which made him the league's top scorer, and the most scored in a single season. In the following season - the club winning the League for fifth time, and Crown Prince Cup. In the 2001–02 season, on May 1, 2002, Ittihad lost the league final to Al-Hilal, a cross from a corner kick went to Al Hasan Al-Yami, who hit it and the ball entered the goal clearly before Al Hilal's Mohammed Al-Nazhan took it out with his hand. A goal was not awarded by the referee, even as a penalty kick, which in turn ended with a loss 1–2, where the referee was suspended six months after the final - and later apologized, declaring, "I am innocent of your defeat, and God bears witness to that." The match created a great controversy at all levels, as it faced a lot of criticism, which was considered by many and critics as a "robbery".

When Ahmed Masoud left the club, Mansour Al-Balawi became president, which is considered by many including the fans as the most prominent and successful period in the club's history. In the 2002–03 season, many players have been brought in, such as Tukar, Saud Kariri, Muhammad Al-Khilaiwi, and Tcheco; who is considered as one of the greatest deals in the club's history, while both the League and the Crown Prince Cup were achieved. Despite leading the league and ending it without a loss, Ittihad lost the league final to Al-Shabab in the championship-playoff finals. In the 2004 AFC Champions League, Ittihad finished the group in first place with only one loss. In quarter-finals, it was successfully passed with a 1–1 draw in Dalian, followed by a home 1–0 victory scored by Tukar, against Chinese Dalian Shide, of which led them to reach the semi-finals. Both matches ended in the last minutes, as Hamad Al-Montashari finished the first leg's 2–1, and Osama Al-Muwallad scored the deadly equalizer in the second leg, with a 4–3 aggregate over Jeonbuk Hyundai Motors, as the club qualified for the final for the first time. The final was out of the ordinary; Ittihad were thrashed at home 1–3 by Korean side Seongnam in the first leg—leading to the sacking of Croatian coach Tomislav Ivić, as assistant coach Dragan Talajić was given the opportunity. Who, in turn, started the return match in Seongnam, Redha Tukar opened the scoring, rising to a ball from a corner kick to score the first goal, Idris scored the second late minute goal in the first half, Mohammed Noor scored the two decisive goals in the second half, before Abushgeer scored the fifth and the last goal. Overcoming the 1–3 loss with a miraculous 5–0 victory, to achieve the first title, Dragan Talajić achievement was unforgettable and almost impossible, this second leg match became one of the most surprising and unforgettable comebacks in AFC Champions League history, which was called "the miracle". Recalling the tournament, Talajić said, "I was initially an assistant to the compatriots Tomislav Ivic, and I learned a lot from him, and I considered the opportunity to work with a great team as a wonderful thing, which is why I agreed to work with him, I was with the team eight months after we arrived at the beginning of the season, and I knew all about the players." and continued, "I was young at the time, and maybe I was crazy by playing with five strikers, I told everyone before the match that we would win, I always knew we would win, but I didn't know if the difference would be enough."

Ittihad achieved its first Arab championship, after defeating Tunisian Club Sportif Sfaxien in the final. On 5 November 2005, Ittihad won the Champions League for the second time in a row, after a 5–3 victory over Al-Ain. Mohammed Kallon, which loaned from AS Monaco, became the top scorer of the tournament with six goals; of which two were in the final—which helped to achieve the second title. Mohammed Noor, was awarded the best player in the tournament. The club remaining as the only to win back-to-back AFC Champions League titles in its current edition. The club qualified for the FIFA Club World Cup for the first time, in the edition that was held in Japan, after achieving the Champions League title—as it became the second Saudi team to qualify for the tournament. On December 11, 2005, Ittihad defeated African champions Al-Ahly after Mohamed Noor's only goal, to qualify for the semi-finals. Ittihad faced the CONMEBOL champion São Paulo, and it was ended by a 2–3 loss. Ittihad played the match to determine the third place against the Costa Rican club Deportivo Saprissa and lost with a 2–3, were two goals scored by Mohamed Kallon and Joseph-Désiré Job—to end the Club World Cup in the 4th place. Former FIFA President Sepp Blatter expressed his admiration, saying, "In 25 years, I have not seen an Asian team this great." Ittihad's success is not limited only to football, but also in basketball, water polo, table tennis, volleyball, and swimming, amongst others. In total, Ittihad has won 8,649 trophies. However, football remains the primary sport.

== Rivalries ==
=== Jeddah Derby ===
The Jeddah derby between Ittihad and Al-Ahli is known to be one of the most competitive games in the Saudi League. From the start of national competitions both clubs were seen as representatives of two rivals from the same city: Jeddah. This rivalry continued annually for more than 70 years, until Al-Ahli were relegated to the first division in 2022. The derby was back on October sixth 2023.

=== Saudi Clasico ===
Saudi El Clasico, or simply the Clasico, is a long-running competitive match in Saudi football, between Ittihad and Al-Hilal. The competition represents the largest and most important two clubs in the city of Jeddah and the capital, Riyadh, the largest and most culturally prominent cities in the Kingdom of Saudi Arabia. The two clubs are considered the most successful at domestic and continental level. Ittihad is the oldest sports club still surviving in the Kingdom of Saudi Arabia, and is seen as the People's Club. While Al-Hilal represents the culture of the Capital Club, it is called by the masses the Leader. The two teams meet twice a year in the league, as they may also meet in the King's Cup or the Saudi Super Cup or the AFC Champions League. It is considered as the most prominent and most watched match in Saudi football.

The first meeting between the two teams was held on July 27, 1962, a friendly match, in the capital, Riyadh, and ended with a 2–0 victory for Ittihad. The first official meeting between the two teams was on January 10, 1964, the King's Cup Final, which in turn also ended with a 3–0 victory for Ittihad.

Together with Al-Nassr, they are the only 3 teams that have not been relegated to the Second Division since its founding.

== Present-day ==
Ittihad is based in Sahafa street, Mushrefa district, in southeastern Jeddah, where they have a large sports complex. Senior teams play official games at the King Abdullah Sports City, north of the city, while youth teams play at the club's headquarters.

== Fanbase ==
Ittihad is the highest-attended club in Saudi Arabia. In the 2014-15 Saudi League, Ittihad's attendance during 12 home games averaged 42,371 per match. In 2016, American website The Sportster ranked Ittihad fans the 12th most influential football fans in the world. Ittihad has built a strong fan-base across Saudi Arabia, amongst the Arab League and in Asia. Since its opening on 1 May 2014, Ittihad shares the King Abdullah Sports City Stadium with local rival Al-Ahli, while their previous home the Prince Abdullah Al Faisal Stadium faced construction until it was renovated in 2022.

== Sponsorship ==
=== Official sponsor ===
In a press conference on 9 January 2006, president of the club Mansour Albalawi announced that Sela Sport Co (which is the sponsor of Saudi National Team) will pay 350 million riyals to sponsor Ittihad for 5 seasons. Ittihad was later on sponsored by the Saudi Telecom Company, however the team has not renewed STC's contract.

Period	Kit manufacturer	Shirt sponsor
1999–03	Umbro	Multiple
2003–05	Lotto	Lingo
2006–07	Hattrick	STC
2007–08	Nike	STC
2008–10	Lotto	STC
2010–12	Nike	STC
2012–13	One	STC
2013–2014	One	None
2014–2015	Errea	None
2015–2016	Adidas	Bupa Arabia / Mobil 1
2016–2017	Joma	Bridgestone / Unionaire / Almosafer / Mobil 1
2017–2018	Joma	Bridgestone / Unionaire / Mobil 1
2018–2019	Joma	Noon / faqih / Mobil 1
2019–2020	Stribes /S.Team	Noon / faqih / C. Hub / Al Wefaq Rent A Car / Ibrahim Al-Qurashi
2020–2021	Tamim	faqih / C. Hub / Al Wefaq Rent A Car / Ibrahim Al-Qurashi
2021–2022	Erreà	Yelo / Emkan
2022–2023	Nike	Yelo / Emkan / DARCO / SAL / Tameeni / ALAMOUDI
2023–2024	Nike	Roshn (Note: owned by Public Investment Fund) / SURJ Sports Investments / Nua
2024–2025	Nike	Roshn / SURJ Sports Investments / Milaf / Yaqoot / Jamjoom Pharma / Flow Progressive Logistics / Volkswagen
2025–2026	Nike	Roshn / Flow Progressive Logistics / Volkswagen / SURJ Sports Investments
2026–2027	Nike	Al Balad Development Company / Flow Progressive Logistics / Milaf / TCL

== Honours ==
Ittihad is one of the most of successful clubs in Saudi Arabia, they have won 39 official honours, 32 of which are domestic. In addition to their continental successes, the club is one of the only four Asian clubs to have won the AFC Champions League twice in a row.

Ittihad honours
Type	Competition	Titles	Seasons
Domestic	Premier League/Pro League	14	1958–59, 1959–60, 1960–61, 1963–64, 1981–82, 1996–97, 1998–99, 1999–2000, 2000–01, 2002–03, 2006–07, 2008–09, 2022–23, 2024–25
Domestic	King's Cup	6	1967, 1988, 2010, 2013, 2018, 2025
Domestic	Saudi Super Cup	1	2022
Domestic	Crown Prince's Cup	8	1958, 1959, 1960, 1963, 1991, 1997, 2001, 2004, 2016–17
Domestic	Saudi Federation Cup	3	1986, 1997, 1999
Continental	AFC Champions League Elite	2	2004, 2005
Continental	Asian Cup Winners Cup	1	1999
Regional	Arab Champions League	1	2005
Regional	GCC Champions League	1	1999
Regional	Saudi-Egyptian Super Cup	2	2001, 2003

- record
- ^{s} shared record

== Statistics ==
=== Other records ===
Season	Div.	Pos.	Pl.	W	D	L	GS	GA	GD	P	Domestic cups		Asia		Other competitions		Top scorer		Manager
1998–99	SPL	1	22	15	3	4	45	32	+13	48	CPC	PFC	ACWC,	ASC	GCC				(Belgium) Davidovic
1999–2000	SPL	1	22	16	3	3	69	23	+46	51	CPC						(Saudi Arabia) Hamzah Idris	33	(Brazil) Oscar
2000–01	SPL	1	22	11	5	6	35	23	+12	38	CPC				EC		—		(Argentina) Ardiles
2001–02	SPL	2	22	15	4	3	59	25	+34	49	CPC						—		(Brazil) Oscar
2002–03	SPL	1	22	15	4	3	53	24	+29	49	CPC	PFC			SSC	EC	(Brazil) Cleberson	8	(Brazil) Oscar, (Saudi Arabia) Khalid Al Koroni
2003–04	SPL	2	22	17	5	0	57	15	+42	56	CPC		ACL				(Saudi Arabia) Mohammed Noor	8	(Croatia) Tomislav Ivić, (Croatia) Talajić, (Croatia) Luka Peruzović
2004–05	SPL	3	22	11	5	6	53	37	+16	38	CPC		ACL		ARCL		(Brazil) Sérgio Ricardo Messias Neves	13	(Romania) Iordănescu
2005–06	SPL	3	22	11	9	2	47	28	+19	42	CPC		ACL	Quarter-finals			(Sierra Leone) Mohamed Kallon	12	(France) Metsu
2006–07	SPL	1	22	15	3	4	52	25	+27	48	CPC	PFC					(Guinea) Alhassane Keita	21	(Belgium) Dimitri
2007–08	SPL	2	22	14	6	2	40	16	+24	48	CC		ACL	Group stage			(Brazil) Magno Alves	14	(Argentina) Calderón
2008–09	SPL	1	22	17	4	1	57	21	+36	55	CC	PFC	ACL				(Morocco) Hicham Aboucherouane	17	(Argentina) Calderón
2009–10	ZPL	2	22	14	3	5	46	30	+16	45	CC		ACL	Group stage			(Algeria) Abdelmalek Ziaya	15	(Argentina) Calderón, (Argentina) Enzo Héctor
2010–11	ZPL	2	26	13	12	1	49	23	+20	51	CC		ACL	Semi-finals			(Saudi Arabia) Naif Hazazi	18	(Portugal) Manuel José, (Portugal) Toni, (Belgium) Dimitri
2011–12	ZPL	5	26	10	7	9	49	35	+14	37	CPC		ACL	Semi-finals			(Saudi Arabia) Hazazi	20	(Slovenia) Kek, (Spain) Raul Caneda
2012–13	ZPL	7	26	8	9	9	36	36	0	33	CC						(Saudi Arabia) Fahad Al-Muwallad	9	(Spain) Raul Caneda, (Spain) Beñat
2013–14	ALJ	6	26	8	8	10	45	46	−1	32	CC		ACL	Quarter-finals			(Saudi Arabia) Mukhtar Fallatah	31	(Spain) Beñat, (Egypt) Amro Anwar, (Uruguay) Juan Verzeri, (Saudi Arabia) Khalid Al Koroni
2014–15	ALJ	4	26	16	4	6	44	33	+11	52	CC						(Brazil) Marquinho	13	(Saudi Arabia) Khalid Al Koroni, (Romania) Victor Pițurcă
2015–16	ALJ	3	26	15	4	7	54	37	+17	49	CC	CPC	ACL	Group stage			(Venezuela) Gelmin Rivas	24	(Romania) László Bölöni, (Egypt) Amro Anwar, (Romania) Victor Pițurcă
2016–17	ALJ	4	26	17	4	5	57	37	+20	52 (-3)	CPC						(Egypt) Kahraba	19	(Chile) José Luis Sierra
2017–18	SPL	9	26	8	9	9	34	41	-7	33	CC						(Tunisia) Ahmed Akaïchi	10	(Chile) José Luis Sierra
2018–19	MBS	10	30	9	7	14	44	45	-1	34	CC						(Saudi Arabia) Fahad Al-Muwallad	11	(Argentina) Ramón Díaz, (Croatia) Slaven Bilić, (Chile) José Luis Sierra
2019-20	SPL	11	30	9	8	13	42	41	+1	35							(Brazil) Romarinho	13	(Chile) José Luis Sierra, (Netherlands) Henk ten Cate, (Brazil) Fábio Carille
2020-21	SPL	3	30	15	11	4	45	29	+16	56							(Brazil) Romarinho	16	(Brazil) Fábio Carille
2021-22	SPL	2	30	20	5	5	62	29	+33	65							(Brazil) Romarinho	20	(Brazil) Fábio Carille, (Romania) Cosmin Contra

=== League records ===
Season	Division	Tms.	Pos.	Pts
1976–77	Premier League	8	4	**16**
1977–78	Premier League	10	4	**19**
1978–79	Premier League	10	3	**24**
1979–80	Premier League	10	3	**21**
1980–81	Premier League	10	6	**19**
1981–82	Premier League	20(10)	1	**29**
1982–83	Premier League	10	6	**16**
1983–84	Premier League	10	2	**25**
1984–85	Premier League	12	6	**22**
1985–86	Premier League	12	2	–
1986–87	Premier League	12	7	**23**
1987–88	Premier League	12	4	**27**
1988–89	Premier League	12	6	**27**
1989–90	Premier League	12	8	**20**
1990–91	Premier League	12	5	**26**
1991–92	Premier League	12	5	**26**
1992–93	Premier League	12	3	**26**
1993–94	Premier League	12	7	**29**
1994–95	Premier League	12	7	**30**
1995–96	Premier League	12	3	**41**
1996–97	Premier League	12	1	**44**
1997–98	Premier League	12	7	**28**
1998–99	Premier League	12	1	**48**
1999–00	Premier League	12	1	**51**

Season	Division	Tms.	Pos.	Pts
2000–01	Premier League	12	1	38
2001–02	Premier League	12	2	49
2002–03	Premier League	12	1	49
2003–04	Premier League	12	2	56
2004–05	Premier League	12	3	38
2005–06	Premier League	12	3	42
2006–07	Premier League	12	1	48
2007–08	Premier League	12	2	48
2008–09	Professional League	12	1	55
2009–10	Professional League	12	2	45
2010–11	Professional League	14	2	51
2011–12	Professional League	14	5	37
2012–13	Professional League	14	7	37
2013–14	Professional League	14	6	37
2014–15	Professional League	14	4	52
2015–16	Professional League	14	3	49
2016–17	Professional League	14	4	52
2017–18	Professional League	14	9	33
2018–19	Professional League	16	10	34
2019–20	Professional League	16	11	35
2020–21	Professional League	16	3	56
2021–22	Professional League	16	2	65
2022–23	Professional League	16	1	72
2023–24	Professional League	18	5	54
2024–25	Professional League	18	1	83

=== Asian record ===
==== Overview ====
As of 25 April 2026

Competition	Pld	W	D	L	GF	GA
Asian Club Championship / AFC Champions League Elite	120	66	23	31	229	127
Asian Cup Winners' Cup	20	11	7	2	34	14
Asian Super Cup	2	1	0	1	2	2
**TOTAL**	**142**	**78**	**30**	**34**	**265**	**143**

==== Record by country ====
Country	Pld	W	D	L	GF	GA	GD	Win%
Bahrain	4	4	0	0	14	4	+10	100.00
China	6	3	2	1	15	8	+7	50.00
Iran	26	13	5	8	46	28	+18	50.00
Iraq	6	3	1	2	9	6	+3	50.00
Japan	5	3	0	2	10	6	+4	60.00
Jordan	1	1	0	0	2	1	+1	100.00
Kazakhstan	1	0	0	1	1	2	−1	0.00
Kuwait	4	3	1	0	5	1	+4	75.00
Qatar	15	11	2	2	48	14	+34	73.33
Saudi Arabia	11	6	1	4	13	12	+1	54.55
South Korea	12	6	1	5	27	17	+10	50.00
Syria	4	3	0	1	6	4	+2	75.00
Thailand	1	0	1	0	1	1	+0	0.00
United Arab Emirates	23	8	9	6	29	22	+7	34.78
Uzbekistan	23	14	7	2	39	17	+22	60.87

==== Matches ====
The teams in bold are the teams that managed to get the final result against Al-Ittihad. (And for matches that were two-legged, the aggregate results of the two matches have been taken into account.)

Season	Competition	Round	Club	Home	Away	Aggregate
1992–93	Asian Cup Winners' Cup	2R	(Kuwait) Al-Arabi	2–1	1−0	**3–1**
1992–93	Asian Cup Winners' Cup	SF	(Iran) Persepolis	1–1	0−1	**1–2**
1994–95	Asian Cup Winners' Cup	2R	(Bahrain) Al-Muharraq	3–1	3−1	**6–2**
1994–95	Asian Cup Winners' Cup	QF	(Qatar) Al-Sadd	0–0	2−0	**2–0**
1994–95	Asian Cup Winners' Cup	SF	(United Arab Emirates) Al-Shaab	1–1 (3–4 p)		**1–1 (3–4 p)**
1994–95	Asian Cup Winners' Cup	Third place	**(Thailand) TOT**	1–1 (4–2 p)		**1–1 (4–2 p)**
1998–99	Asian Cup Winners' Cup	2R	(Qatar) Al-Ahli	7–1	0−0	**7–1**
1998–99	Asian Cup Winners' Cup	QF	(Uzbekistan) Pakhtakor	3–0	1−0	**4–0**
1998–99	Asian Cup Winners' Cup	SF	(Iraq) Al-Talaba	3–1		**3–1**
1998–99	Asian Cup Winners' Cup	Final	(South Korea) Jeonnam Dragons	3–2 (a.e.t.)		**3–2 (a.e.t.)**
1999	Asian Super Cup	Final	(Japan) Júbilo Iwata	2–1	0–1	**2−2** (a)
1999–2000	Asian Cup Winners' Cup	2R	(Iran) Esteghlal	1–0	1−1	**2–1**
1999–2000	Asian Cup Winners' Cup	QF	(Iraq) Al-Zawraa	1–2	0−0	**1–2**
2000–01	Asian Club Championship	1R	(Lebanon) Al-Ansar	–	–	**w/o**
2000–01	Asian Club Championship	2R	(Bahrain) Al-Ahli	2–0	6–2	**8–2**
2000–01	Asian Club Championship	QF	(Iran) Persepolis	0–0		**3rd**
2000–01	Asian Club Championship	QF	(Saudi Arabia) Al-Hilal	2–0		**3rd**
2000–01	Asian Club Championship	QF	(Kazakhstan) Irtysh	**1–2**		**3rd**
2001–02	Asian Club Championship	1R	(Jordan) Al-Ahli	–	–	**w/o**
2001–02	Asian Club Championship	R16	**(Iran) Esteghlal**	3–2	1–2	**4–4** (a)
2004	AFC Champions League	Group D	(Kuwait) Al-Arabi	2–0	0–0	**1st**
2004	AFC Champions League	Group D	(Uzbekistan) Neftchi	3−0	3−1	**1st**
2004	AFC Champions League	Group D	(Iran) Sepahan	4−0	2−3	**1st**
2004	AFC Champions League	QF	(China) Dalian Shide	1−0	1−1	**2–1**
2004	AFC Champions League	SF	(South Korea) Jeonbuk	2−1	2−2	**4–3**
2004	AFC Champions League	Final	(South Korea) Seongnam Ilhwa Chunma	1−3	5−0	**6–3**
2005	AFC Champions League	QF	(China) Shandong Luneng Taishan	7−2	1−1	**8–3**
2005	AFC Champions League	SF	(South Korea) Busan IPark	2−0	5−0	**7–0**
2005	AFC Champions League	Final	(United Arab Emirates) Al-Ain	4−2	1−1	**5–3**
2006	AFC Champions League	QF	**(Syria) Al-Karamah**	2−0	0−4	**2–4 (a.e.t.)**
2008	AFC Champions League	Group A	**(Uzbekistan) Bunyodkor**	1–0	0–2	**2nd**
2008	AFC Champions League	Group A	(Syria) Al-Ittihad	3–0	1–0	**2nd**
2008	AFC Champions League	Group A	**(Iran) Sepahan**	0–1	1–2	**2nd**
2009	AFC Champions League	Group C	(Iran) Esteghlal	2–1	1–1	**1st**
2009	AFC Champions League	Group C	(Qatar) Umm Salal	7–0	3–1	**1st**
2009	AFC Champions League	Group C	(United Arab Emirates) Al-Jazira	1–1	0–0	**1st**
2009	AFC Champions League	R16	(Saudi Arabia) Al-Shabab	2−1	—N/a	**2–1**
2009	AFC Champions League	QF	(Uzbekistan) Pakhtakor	4−0	1–1	**5–1**
2009	AFC Champions League	SF	(Japan) Nagoya Grampus	6−2	2–1	**8–3**
2009	AFC Champions League	Final	**(South Korea) Pohang Steelers**	1–2		**1–2**
2010	AFC Champions League	Group B	**(Uzbekistan) Bunyodkor**	1–1	0–3	**3rd**
2010	AFC Champions League	Group B	**(Iran) Zob Ahan**	2–2	0–1	**3rd**
2010	AFC Champions League	Group B	(United Arab Emirates) Al-Wahda	4–0	2–0	**3rd**
2011	AFC Champions League	Group C	(Iran) Persepolis	3–1	2–3	**1st**
2011	AFC Champions League	Group C	(Uzbekistan) Bunyodkor	1–1	1–0	**1st**
2011	AFC Champions League	Group C	(United Arab Emirates) Al-Wahda	0–0	3–0	**1st**
2011	AFC Champions League	R16	(Saudi Arabia) Al-Hilal	3−1	—N/a	**3–1**
2011	AFC Champions League	QF	(South Korea) FC Seoul	3−1	0–1	**3–2**
2011	AFC Champions League	SF	**(South Korea) Jeonbuk**	2–3	1–2	**3–5**
2012	AFC Champions League	Group B	(Uzbekistan) Pakhtakor	4–0	2–1	**1st**
2012	AFC Champions League	Group B	(Qatar) Al-Arabi	3–2	3–1	**1st**
2012	AFC Champions League	Group B	(United Arab Emirates) Baniyas	1–0	0–0	**1st**
2012	AFC Champions League	R16	(Iran) Persepolis	3−0	—N/a	**3–0**
2012	AFC Champions League	QF	(China) Guangzhou Evergrande	4−2	1–2	**5–4**
2012	AFC Champions League	SF	**(Saudi Arabia) Al-Ahli**	1–0	0–2	**1–2**
2014	AFC Champions League	Group C	(Iran) Tractor Sazi	2–0	0–1	**2nd**
2014	AFC Champions League	Group C	(United Arab Emirates) Al-Ain	2–1	1–1	**2nd**
2014	AFC Champions League	Group C	(Qatar) Lekhwiya	3–1	0–2	**2nd**
2014	AFC Champions League	R16	(Saudi Arabia) Al-Shabab	1−0	3–1	**4–1**
2014	AFC Champions League	QF	**(United Arab Emirates) Al-Ain**	1−3	0–2	**1–5**
2016	AFC Champions League	PO	(Jordan) Al-Wehdat	2–1	–	**2–1**
2016	AFC Champions League	Group A	(Uzbekistan) Lokomotiv Tashkent	1–1	1–1	**3rd**
2016	AFC Champions League	Group A	**(United Arab Emirates) Al-Nasr**	1–2	0–0	**3rd**
2016	AFC Champions League	Group A	(Iran) Sepahan	4–0	2–0	**3rd**
2019	AFC Champions League	Group B	(Qatar) Al-Rayyan	5–1	2–0	**2nd**
2019	AFC Champions League	Group B	(United Arab Emirates) Al-Wahda	1–1	1–4	**2nd**
2019	AFC Champions League	Group B	(Uzbekistan) Lokomotiv Tashkent	3–2	1–1	**2nd**
2019	AFC Champions League	R16	(Iran) Zob Ahan	2–1	4–3	**6–4**
2019	AFC Champions League	QF	**(Saudi Arabia) Al-Hilal**	0–0	1–3	**1–3**
2023–24	AFC Champions League	Group C	(Uzbekistan) AGMK	3–0	2–1	**2nd**
2023–24	AFC Champions League	Group C	(Iran) Sepahan	2–1	3–0	**2nd**
2023–24	AFC Champions League	Group C	**(Iraq) Al-Quwa Al-Jawiya**	1–0	0–2	**2nd**
2023–24	AFC Champions League	R16	(Uzbekistan) Navbahor	2–1	0–0	**2–1**
2023–24	AFC Champions League	QF	**(Saudi Arabia) Al-Hilal**	0–2	0–2	**0–4**
2025–26	AFC Champions League Elite	League stage	**(United Arab Emirates) Al-Wahda**	—N/a	1–2	**4th**
2025–26	AFC Champions League Elite	League stage	**(United Arab Emirates) Shabab Al-Ahli**	0–1	—N/a	**4th**
2025–26	AFC Champions League Elite	League stage	(Iraq) Al-Shorta	—N/a	4–1	**4th**
2025–26	AFC Champions League Elite	League stage	(United Arab Emirates) Sharjah FC	3–0	—N/a	**4th**
2025–26	AFC Champions League Elite	League stage	**(Qatar) Al-Duhail**	—N/a	2–4	**4th**
2025–26	AFC Champions League Elite	League stage	(Uzbekistan) Nasaf	1–0	—N/a	**4th**
2025–26	AFC Champions League Elite	League stage	(Qatar) Al-Gharafa	7–0	—N/a	**4th**
2025–26	AFC Champions League Elite	League stage	(Qatar) Al-Sadd	—N/a	4–1	**4th**
2025–26	AFC Champions League Elite	R16	(United Arab Emirates) Al-Wahda	1–0		**1–0 (a.e.t.)**
2025–26	AFC Champions League Elite	QF	**(Japan) Machida Zelvia**	0–1		**0–1**
2026–27	AFC Champions League Elite	PO	(United Arab Emirates) Al-Jazira	—N/a	4–1	**4–1**
2026–27	AFC Champions League Elite	League stage	(Qatar) Al-Shamal	—N/a	1–1	TBD
2026–27	AFC Champions League Elite	League stage	(United Arab Emirates) Shabab Al-Ahli	1–2	—N/a	TBD
2026–27	AFC Champions League Elite	League stage	(Uzbekistan) Neftchi	—N/a	2–1	TBD
2026–27	AFC Champions League Elite	League stage	(United Arab Emirates) Al-Ain	1–4	—N/a	TBD
2026–27	AFC Champions League Elite	League stage	(Uzbekistan) Pakhtakor		—N/a	TBD
2026–27	AFC Champions League Elite	League stage	(United Arab Emirates) Al-Wasl	—N/a		TBD
2026–27	AFC Champions League Elite	League stage	(Qatar) Al-Gharafa		—N/a	TBD
2026–27	AFC Champions League Elite	League stage	(Qatar) Al-Sadd	—N/a		TBD

Key: PO – Play-off round; 1R/2R – First/Second round; R16 – Round of 16; QF – Quarter-final; SF – Semi-final;

Notes

Al-Ansar withdrew.
Al-Ahli Amman withdrew.
The match was awarded as a 3–0 win to Al-Ittihad due to Sepahan's violation of the rules.

==== Top scorers in Asian competitions ====
	Player	Country	Goals
1	Mohammed Noor	Saudi Arabia	22
2	Naif Hazazi	Saudi Arabia	14
3	Hamzah Idris	Saudi Arabia	9
4	Fahad Al-Muwallad	Saudi Arabia	8
5	Abdelmalek Ziaya	Algeria	7
5	Mukhtar Fallatah	Saudi Arabia	7
5	Romarinho	Brazil	7
8	Ahmed Bahja	Morocco	6
8	Marzouk Al-Otaibi	Saudi Arabia	6
8	Osama Al-Muwallad	Saudi Arabia	6
8	Mohammed Kallon	Sierra Leone	6
8	Houssem Aouar	Algeria	6

== Players ==
As of 11 September 2026

Note: Flags indicate national team as defined under FIFA eligibility rules; some limited exceptions apply. Players may hold more than one non-FIFA nationality.

No.	Pos.	Nation	Player
1	GK	SRB	Predrag Rajković
2	MF	POR	Danilo Pereira (captain)
4	DF	SRB	Jan-Carlo Simić
5	MF	COL	Richard Ríos (on loan from Benfica)
6	DF	KSA	Saad Al-Mousa
7	FW	POR	Roger Fernandes
8	MF	KSA	Mukhtar Ali
9	FW	NGR	George Ilenikhena
10	MF	ALG	Houssem Aouar
11	FW	KSA	Saleh Al-Shehri
13	DF	KSA	Muhannad Al-Shanqeeti
15	DF	KSA	Hassan Kadesh
17	MF	MLI	Mahamadou Doumbia
20	DF	KSA	Ahmed Sharahili
21	FW	MAR	Youssef En-Nesyri
22	MF	KSA	Marwan Al-Sahafi

No.	Pos.	Nation	Player
23	MF	NED	Georginio Wijnaldum
25	DF	KSA	Faris Abdi
27	MF	KSA	Ahmed Al-Ghamdi
29	MF	KSA	Farhah Al-Shamrani
30	MF	SEN	Dion Lopy
32	DF	KSA	Ahmed Al-Julaydan
34	FW	NED	Steven Bergwijn
41	MF	KSA	Mohammed Fallatah
42	DF	KSA	Muath Faqeehi
50	GK	KSA	Mohammed Al-Absi
60	MF	KSA	Rakan Kaabi
66	DF	KSA	Mohammed Barnawi
80	MF	KSA	Hamed Al-Ghamdi
87	DF	KSA	Yaseen Al-Jaber
88	GK	KSA	Osama Al-Mermesh

=== Out on loan ===
Note: Flags indicate national team as defined under FIFA eligibility rules; some limited exceptions apply. Players may hold more than one non-FIFA nationality.

No.	Pos.	Nation	Player
3	DF	CMR	Stephane Keller (at Beveren)
12	DF	ALB	Mario Mitaj (at Genoa)
16	MF	KSA	Faisal Al-Ghamdi (at Neom)
37	DF	KSA	Fawaz Al-Sqoor (at Al-Khaleej)
47	GK	KSA	Hamed Al-Shanqiti (at Al-Kholood)

No.	Pos.	Nation	Player
51	MF	ARG	Mateo Borrell (at Abha)
55	MF	VEN	Bryant Ortega (at Al-Muharraq)
77	MF	KSA	Abdulelah Hawsawi (at Al-Ettifaq)
90	FW	KSA	Talal Haji (at Al-Ettifaq)
—	MF	ESP	Unai Hernández (at Girona)

== Notable players ==
KSA	AFC	CAF	UEFA	CONMEBOL	CONCACAF
(Saudi Arabia) Mohammed Noor; (Saudi Arabia) Hamzah Idris; (Saudi Arabia) Naif Hazazi; (Saudi Arabia) Abdulrahman Al-Qahtani; (Saudi Arabia) Abdoh Otaif; (Saudi Arabia) Saud Kariri; (Saudi Arabia) Marzouk Al-Otaibi; (Saudi Arabia) Osama Al-Muwallad; (Saudi Arabia) Hussein Al-Sadiq; (Saudi Arabia) Sulaiman Al-Hadaithy; (Saudi Arabia) Mohammed Al-Khilaiwi; (Saudi Arabia) Khamis Al-Zahrani; (Saudi Arabia) Hamad Al-Eissa; (Saudi Arabia) Ahmed Jamil Madani; (Saudi Arabia) Mabrouk Zaid; (Saudi Arabia) Hamad Al-Montashari; (Saudi Arabia) Ahmed Dokhi; (Saudi Arabia) Khamis Al-Owairan; (Saudi Arabia) Mohammed Amin Haidar; (Saudi Arabia) Ahmed Al-Fraidi; (Saudi Arabia) Redha Tukar; (Saudi Arabia) Saleh Al-Saqri; (Saudi Arabia) Manaf Abushgeer; (Saudi Arabia) Nezar Abbas; (Saudi Arabia) Ahmed Khuraish; (Saudi Arabia) Abdullah Al-Waked; (Saudi Arabia) Talal Al-Meshal; (Saudi Arabia) Ibrahim Suwayed; (Saudi Arabia) Saeed Ghorab; (Saudi Arabia) Al-Noor Musa; (Saudi Arabia) Tareq Al-Muwallad; (Saudi Arabia) Khaled Massaad; (Saudi Arabia) Khaled Gahwji; (Saudi Arabia) Al Hasan Al-Yami; (Saudi Arabia) Adnan Fallatah; (Saudi Arabia) Assaf Al-Qarni; (Saudi Arabia) Jamal Bajandouh; (Saudi Arabia) Ahmed Assiri; (Saudi Arabia) Fawaz Al-Qarni	(Oman) Ahmed Hadid Al-Mukhaini; (Kuwait) Fahad Al Enezi; (Kuwait) Fahad Al Ansari; (Bahrain) Abdullah Omar; (Australia) James Troisi; (Australia) Matthew Jurman; (Lebanon) Mohamad Haidar; (Jordan) Mohammad Al-Dmeiri; (Iraq) Saif Salman	(Morocco) Abderrazak Hamdallah; (Algeria) Abdelmalek Ziaya; (Algeria) Houssem Aouar; (Tunisia) Amine Chermiti; (Tunisia) Jameleddine Limam; (Tunisia) Témime Lahzami; (Tunisia) Néjib Ghommidh; (Tunisia) Taoufik Belghith; (Tunisia) Lotfi Mhaissi; (Tunisia) Ahmed Akaïchi; (Tunisia) Anice Badri; (Egypt) Emad Moteab; (Egypt) Hosny Abd Rabo; (Egypt) Islam El-Shater; (Egypt) Kahraba; (Egypt) Tarek Hamed; (Egypt) Ahmed Hegazi; (Sierra Leone) Mohamed Kallon; (South Africa) Zane Moosa; (Ghana) Ablade Kumah; (Ghana) Sulley Muntari; (Ghana) Prince Tagoe; (Ivory Coast) Didier Ya Konan; (Ivory Coast) Wilfried Bony; (Cameroon) Modeste M'bami; (Cameroon) Joseph-Désiré Job; (Guinea) Alhassane Keita; (Guinea) Titi Camara; (Nigeria) Ibrahim Babangida; (Nigeria) Tijani Babangida; (Nigeria) Mutiu Adepoju; (Republic of the Congo) Fabrice Ondama; (Mali) Samba Diakité; (Cape Verde) Garry Rodrigues	(France) Karim Benzema; (France) N'Golo Kanté; (France) Moussa Diaby; (Germany) Theo Bücker; (Italy) Roberto Donadoni; (Italy) Michele Gelsi; (Serbia) Dejan Petković; (Serbia) Aleksandar Prijović; (Serbia) Aleksandar Pešić; (Russia) Vladimir Tatarchuk; (Russia) Oleg Sergeyev; (Portugal) Jota; (Portugal) Paulo Jorge; (Portugal) Nuno Assis; (Portugal) Danilo Pereira; (Romania) Lucian Sânmărtean; (Poland) Łukasz Szukała; (England) Dalian Atkinson; (Netherlands) Rob Witschge; (Netherlands) Steven Bergwijn; (Netherlands) Georginio Wijnaldum; (Slovenia) Milenko Ačimovič; (Croatia) Anas Sharbini; (Croatia) Mario Carević; (Hungary) György Sándor; (Sweden) Thomas Sjöberg	(Brazil) Fabinho; (Brazil) Tcheco; (Brazil) Sérgio Ricardo; (Brazil) Thiago Gentil; (Brazil) Guilherme Alves; (Brazil) Wágner; (Brazil) Magno Alves; (Brazil) Wendel; (Brazil) Cleberson; (Brazil) Cláudio Pitbull; (Brazil) Leandro Bonfim; (Brazil) Bebeto; (Brazil) Dimba; (Brazil) Reinaldo; (Brazil) Renato Cajá; (Brazil) Renan Teixeira; (Brazil) Marquinho; (Brazil) Diego Souza; (Brazil) Jóbson; (Brazil) Fernando Baiano; (Brazil) Lindomar; (Brazil) Bill; (Brazil) Thiago Carleto; (Brazil) Valdívia; (Brazil) Bruno Uvini; (Brazil) Jonas; (Brazil) Romarinho; (Brazil) Marcelo Grohe; (Brazil) Igor Coronado; (Brazil) Bruno Henrique; (Peru) Alfonso Yáñez; (Argentina) Rolando Zárate; (Argentina) Luciano Leguizamón; (Argentina) Emiliano Vecchio; (Venezuela) Gelmin Rivas; (Colombia) Sergio Herrera; (Chile) Luis Jiménez; (Chile) Carlos Villanueva	(Mexico) Jared Borgetti; (United States) Hugo Pérez

== Staff ==
=== Current Managers Team ===
Position	Staff
Head coach	(Germany) Jens Wissing
Assistant coach	(Germany) Jörn-Erik Wolf (Germany) Harry Pufal (Saudi Arabia) Hassan Khalifa
Athletic coach	(Germany) Timo Rosenberg
Goalkeeping coach	(Croatia) Vedran Runje
Fitness coach	(Portugal) João Costa
Performance analyst	(Portugal) Eduardo Oliveira
Medical Team	(Portugal) Sergio Gomez (Algeria) Ali Yagdah
Physiotherapist	(Saudi Arabia) Abdulraouf Al-Solmi
Additional assistant	(Portugal) Fábio Moura
Sports coordinator	(Germany) Maximilian Bierstedt

=== Board Directors ===
Position	Staff
President	(Saudi Arabia) Loay Mashabi
Vice President	(Saudi Arabia) Abdulaziz Al-Zaid
Chief Executive Officer	(Portugal) Domingos Soares de Oliveira
Director of Football	(Spain) Ramón Planes
Board Member	(Saudi Arabia) Fahad Sindi
Board Member	(Saudi Arabia) Abdullah Al-Ghamdi
Board Member	(Saudi Arabia) Abdullah Al-Husaini
Board Member	(Saudi Arabia) Fares Al-Hejailan
Board Member	(Saudi Arabia) Suhaib Jamjoom

== Managerial history ==
Name	From	To
(United Arab Republic) Omar Shendi	1960	1960
(Sudan) Khalil Abo Zaid	1961	1961
(Saudi Arabia) Saeed Hussain	1961	1962
(Austria) Friedrich Pimperl	1966	1967
(Tunisia) Bashir Al-Sagheer	1967	1968
(Austria) Friedrich Pimperl	1968	1969
(Tunisia) Ali Chaouach	1970	1970
(Saudi Arabia) Abdullah Abo Dawood	1970	1970
(Tunisia) Ali Selmi	1975	1977
(Tunisia) Jamel Eddine Bouabsa	1977	1978
(Germany) Dettmar Cramer	1978	1981
(Egypt) Mahmoud El-Gohary	1981	1981
(Brazil) Chinesinho	1981	1982
(Brazil) Carlos Alberto Silva	1982	April 10, 1983
(Brazil) Chinesinho	April 10, 1983	May 13, 1983
(Brazil) Joubert Luis Meira	1983	1984
(Brazil) Vanderlei Luxemburgo	1984	1984
(England) Bob Houghton	1984	22 October 1986
(Austria) Walter Skocik	1987	1989
(Germany) Heinz Höher	1989	1990
(Hungary) Kálmán Mészöly	1991	1992
(Sweden) Roland Andersson	1993	1993
(England) Bob Houghton	1993	1994
(Brazil) Paulo Campos	1995	1996
(Belgium) Dimitri Davidovic	1996	1997
(Hungary) Sándor Egervári	1997	1997
(Hungary) Dezső Novák	1997	1998
(Brazil) Paulo Campos	1998	1998
(Belgium) Dimitri Davidovic	1998	1999
(Brazil) José Oscar Bernardi	1999	2000
(Georgia (country)) Revaz Dzodzuashvili	2000	2000
(Belgium) Dimitri Davidovic	2000	2000
(Italy) Giuseppe Dossena	2000	2001
(Argentina) Osvaldo Ardiles	2001	2001
(Brazil) José Oscar Bernardi	2001	2003
(Italy) Antonello Cuccureddu	2002	2003
(Croatia) Tomislav Ivić	2003	2004
(Croatia) Dragan Talajić (interim)	July 1, 2004	2004
(Croatia) Luka Peruzović	Dec 2004	March 2005
(Romania) Anghel Iordănescu	March 26, 2005	June 30, 2006
(France) Bruno Metsu	2006	April 26, 2006
(Bosnia and Herzegovina) Vahid Halilhodžić	June 5, 2006	August 1, 2006
(Belgium) Dimitri Davidovic	August 1, 2006	2007
(Brazil) José Candinho	2007	2007
(Brazil) Estevam Soares	Dec 20, 2007	Aug 23, 2008
(Argentina) Gabriel Calderón	May 22, 2008	January 13, 2010
(Argentina) Enzo Trossero	January 20, 2010	May 30, 2010
(Portugal) Manuel José	June 2, 2010	December 24, 2010
(Portugal) Toni	December 28, 2010	May 15, 2011
(Belgium) Dimitri Davidovic	May 15, 2011	November 28, 2011
(Saudi Arabia) Abdullah Gurab (interim)	November 29, 2011	December 19, 2011
(Slovenia) Matjaž Kek	December 20, 2011	February 8, 2012
(Saudi Arabia) Abdullah Gurab (interim)	February 8, 2012	February 27, 2012
(Spain) Raul Caneda	February 27, 2012	February 23, 2013
(Spain) Beñat San José	February 23, 2013	December 8, 2013
(Uruguay) Juan Verzeri	January 6, 2014	February 26, 2014
(Saudi Arabia) Khalid Al-Koroni	February 26, 2014	August, 2014
(Egypt) Amro Anwar	August 28, 2014	October 16, 2014
(Romania) Victor Pițurcă	October 16, 2014	June 12, 2015
(Romania) László Bölöni	July 21, 2015	October 23, 2015
(Romania) Victor Pițurcă	December 8, 2015	July 21, 2016
(Chile) José Luis Sierra	July 22, 2016	May 20, 2018
(Argentina) Ramón Díaz	May 23, 2018	September 20, 2018
(Croatia) Slaven Bilić	September 27, 2018	February 24, 2019
(Chile) José Luis Sierra	February 24, 2019	October 20, 2019
(Saudi Arabia) Mohammed Al-Abdali (interim)	October 20, 2019	November 4, 2019
(Netherlands) Henk ten Cate	November 4, 2019	February 11, 2020
(Netherlands) Piet Hamberg (interim)	February 11, 2020	February 17, 2020
(Brazil) Fábio Carille	February 17, 2020	August 24, 2021
(Romania) Cosmin Contra	August 29, 2021	July 4, 2022
(Portugal) Nuno Espírito Santo	July 4, 2022	November 7, 2023
(Saudi Arabia) Hassan Khalifa (interim)	November 7, 2023	November 18, 2023
(Argentina) Marcelo Gallardo	November 18, 2023	July 2, 2024
(France) Laurent Blanc	July 13, 2024	September 28, 2025
(Saudi Arabia) Hassan Khalifa (interim)	September 28, 2025	October 7, 2025
(Portugal) Sérgio Conceição	October 7, 2025	June 2, 2026
(Germany) Jens Wissing	July 10, 2026	present

== See also ==
- List of football clubs in Saudi Arabia
- Al-Ittihad Club (women)
- Al-Ittihad Jeddah (basketball)
- Al-Ittihad Club Stadium

== Notes ==
Achievements
Preceded by Al-Ain (United Arab Emirates)	Champions of Asia; 2004	Succeeded by Holders
Preceded by Holders	Champions of Asia; 2005	Succeeded by Jeonbuk Hyundai Motors (South Korea)

Preceded by Al Nassr (Saudi Arabia)	Asian Cup Winners' Cup; Runner up: Chunnam Dragons; 1999	Succeeded by Shimizu S-Pulse (Japan)
