= Al-Hasan Al-Yami =

Saudi Arabian footballer (born 1972)

Personal information
- Full name: Al-Hasan Ali Al-Yami
- Date of birth: 21 August 1972 (age 54)
- Place of birth: Khafji, Saudi Arabia
- Height: 1.73 m (5 ft 8 in)
- Position: Striker

Team information
- Current team: Najran SC (manager)

Senior career*
Years	Team	Apps	(Gls)
1994–1996	Najran		
1996–2005	Al-Ittihad		(38)
2005–2012	Najran		(68)

International career
2002–2005	Saudi Arabia	21	(5)

Managerial career
- 2013: Najran (caretaker)
- 2015: Najran (caretaker)
- * Club domestic league appearances and goals

Al-Hasan Ali Al-Yami (Arabic: الحسن اليامي; born 21 August 1972) is a Saudi Arabian professional footballer who played as a striker for Najran SC and Al Ittihad.

He featured in the Football World Cup 2002 and was part of the infamous team that was beaten 8-0 in a group match against Germany. Most of his career has been played at the Saudi Arabian football club Al Ittihad.

== Club career ==
Al-Ittihad management offered him 250,000 to move to Jeddah and play for Al-Ittihad, then in 2005 he came back to Najran.

== International career ==
He played for the Saudi Arabia national team during the 2002 gulf tournament and was a very effective member. He scored three goals during that tournament.

== Club Career Stats ==
Club	Season	League		SFC		SCPC		Continental		SFC		Total		
Club	Season	Apps	Goals	Apps	Goals	Apps	Goals	Apps	Goals	Apps	Goals	Apps	Goals	Assist
Al Ittihad	1995–96		1											
Al Ittihad	1996–97		2		1									
Al Ittihad	1997–98		1		1									
Al Ittihad	1998–99		1						4 (Note: 3 Goals in GCC Champions League) (Note: 1 Goal in 1998–99 Asian Cup Winners' Cup)					
Al Ittihad	1999–2000		12		1				3 (Note: 2 Goals in Saudi-Egyptian Super Cup) (Note: 1 Goal in Asian Super Cup)		6			
Al Ittihad	2000–01		5		7		3		8 (Note: 6 Goals in GCC Champions League) (Note: 2 Goal in 2000–01 Asian Club Championship)					
Al Ittihad	2001–02		5				5							
Al Ittihad	2002–03		7		8									
Al Ittihad	2003–04		3						2 (Note: 2 Goals in 2003–04 Arab Champions League)					
Al Ittihad	2004–05		1											
Career total			38		18		8		17		6		87	
Najran	2005–06		12				5							
Najran	2006–07		24		2		1							
Najran	2007–08		16		1		1							
Najran	2008–09	20	5		2									
Najran	2009–10	18	6											
Najran	2010–11	17	5											
Career total			68											
