= Hamad Al-Eissa =

Saudi Arabian footballer

Personal information
- Full name: Hamad Al-Eissa
- Date of birth: May 4, 1982 (age 44)
- Place of birth: Saudi Arabia
- Position: Defender

Senior career*
Years	Team	Apps	(Gls)
2001–2002	Ettifaq FC		
2002–2008	Al Ittihad		
2007–2008	→ Al Shabab (loan)		
2008–2011	Al Hazm		
2011–2013	Al-Ta'ee		
- * Club domestic league appearances and goals

Hamad Al-Eissa (Arabic: حمد العيسى) (born 1982) is a Saudi Arabian football (soccer) player who currently plays as a defender for Al Hazm.
