= Saheb Al-Abdullah =

Saudi Arabian footballer

Personal information
- Full name: Saheb Al-Abdullah
- Date of birth: June 21, 1977 (age 49)
- Place of birth: Almterfi, Saudi Arabia
- Height: 1.76 m (5 ft 9 in)
- Position: Midfielder

Senior career*
Years	Team	Apps	(Gls)
1997–2004	Al-Khaleej	70	(14)
2004–2012	Al-Ahli	101	(6)
2012–2013	Najran	0	(0)
2013	Al-Nahda		
2014	Al-Adalah		
2014–2016	Al-Jeel		
2016–2018	Al-Sawab		

International career
2004–2009	Saudi Arabia	10	(1)
- * Club domestic league appearances and goals

Saheb Al-Abdullah [صاحب العبدالله in Arabic] (born 21 June 1977) is a Saudi football player. He currently plays for Al-Sawab as a midfielder.

== Honours ==
=== Al-Ahli (Jeddah) ===
- Saudi Crown Prince Cup: 2007
- Gulf Club Champions Cup: 2008
- Saudi Champions Cup: 2011, 2012
