= Dimba (footballer, born 1973) =

Brazilian footballer

Personal information
- Full name: Editácio Vieira de Andrade
- Date of birth: December 30, 1973 (age 52)
- Place of birth: Sobradinho, Federal District, Brazil
- Height: 1.74 m (5 ft 9 in)
- Position: Striker

Team information
- Current team: Ceilândia

Senior career*
| Years | Team | Apps | (Gls) |
| 1994–1995 | Sobradinho | | |
| 1995 | Brasília | | |
| 1996 | Gama | | |
| 1996 | Sobradinho | | |
| 1997–1998 | Botafogo | | |
| 1998–1999 | América Mineiro | | |
| 1999 | Portuguesa | | |
| 1999 | Bahia | | |
| 2000 | Leça | | |
| 2000–2001 | Botafogo | | |
| 2002 | Gama | | |
| 2002–2004 | Goiás | | |
| 2004 | Al Ittihad | | |
| 2004–2005 | Flamengo | | |
| 2005–2006 | São Caetano | | |
| 2007–2009 | Brasiliense | | |
| 2010 | Ceilândia | | |
| 2011 | Legião | | |
| 2011 | Peixe Brasília (futsal) | | |
| 2012– | Ceilândia | | |
- * Club domestic league appearances and goals as of January 16, 2012

Editácio Vieira de Andrade (born December 30, 1973), usually known simply as Dimba, is a Brazilian futsal player and footballer who plays as a forward.

== Career ==
=== Football ===
He started his professional football career in 1994, playing for Sobradinho. He stayed at the club until 1995, when he was transferred to Brasília. In the same year, he moved to Gama. In 1996, he returned to Sobradinho. In 1997, he signed with Botafogo of Rio de Janeiro. He left the club in the following year, joining América Mineiro. In 1999, he played for Portuguesa and Bahia. In 2000, for the first time in his career, he played at a non-Brazilian team, as he signed with Leça of Portugal. In 2000 and 2001, he returned to Brazil, playing again for Botafogo. In 2002, he returned to Gama. He played for Goiás between 2002 and 2004. In 2004, he played for Saudi Arabian side Al Ittihad. In 2004, he joined the Carioca team Flamengo, where he stayed until the following year when he moved to São Caetano. In 2007, he moved to Brasiliense. In late 2009, was hired by Ceilândia. He played for Legião in 2010, then he retired.

=== Futsal ===
After his retirement as a football player, he started a career as a futsal player, scoring two goals in his first game for Peixe Brasília, played on October 6, 2011.

=== Return to football ===
He returned to football in 2012 to play for Ceilândia.

== Honors ==
=== Football honors ===
In 1997, playing for Botafogo, he won Taça Guanabara, Taça Rio, and Campeonato Carioca. In 1999, playing for Bahia, he won the Campeonato Baiano. In 2003, playing for Goiás, he scored 31 goals during the Campeonato Brasileiro Série A, being the competition's top goalscorer, and, because of this, he won the Placar magazine Golden Boot (Chuteira de Ouro) award.

6ucar - Guia do Segundo Turno do Brasileirão 2005 - Editora Abril.
