= Naif Al-Qadi =

Saudi Arabian footballer

Personal information
- Full name: Naif Ali Al-Qadi
- Date of birth: 3 April 1979 (age 47)
- Place of birth: Mecca, Saudi Arabia
- Height: 1.76 m (5 ft 9 1/2 in)
- Position: Defender

Senior career*
Years	Team	Apps	(Gls)
2000–2007	Al-Ahli	?	(3)
2006–2007	→ Al-Rayyan (loan)	?	(1)
2007–2014	Al-Shabab	?	(3)

International career^{‡}
2003–2006	Saudi Arabia	28	(2)
- * Club domestic league appearances and goals as of 9 April 2008 ‡ National team caps and goals as of 23 June 2006

Naif Ali Al-Qadi (Arabic: نايف علي القاضي) (born 3 April 1979) is a Saudi Arabian former football (soccer) player who last played as a defender for Al-Shabab.

He played for the Saudi Arabia national team occasionally and was called up to the squad to participate in the 2006 FIFA World Cup.
