= Tcheco =

Brazilian footballer (born 1976)

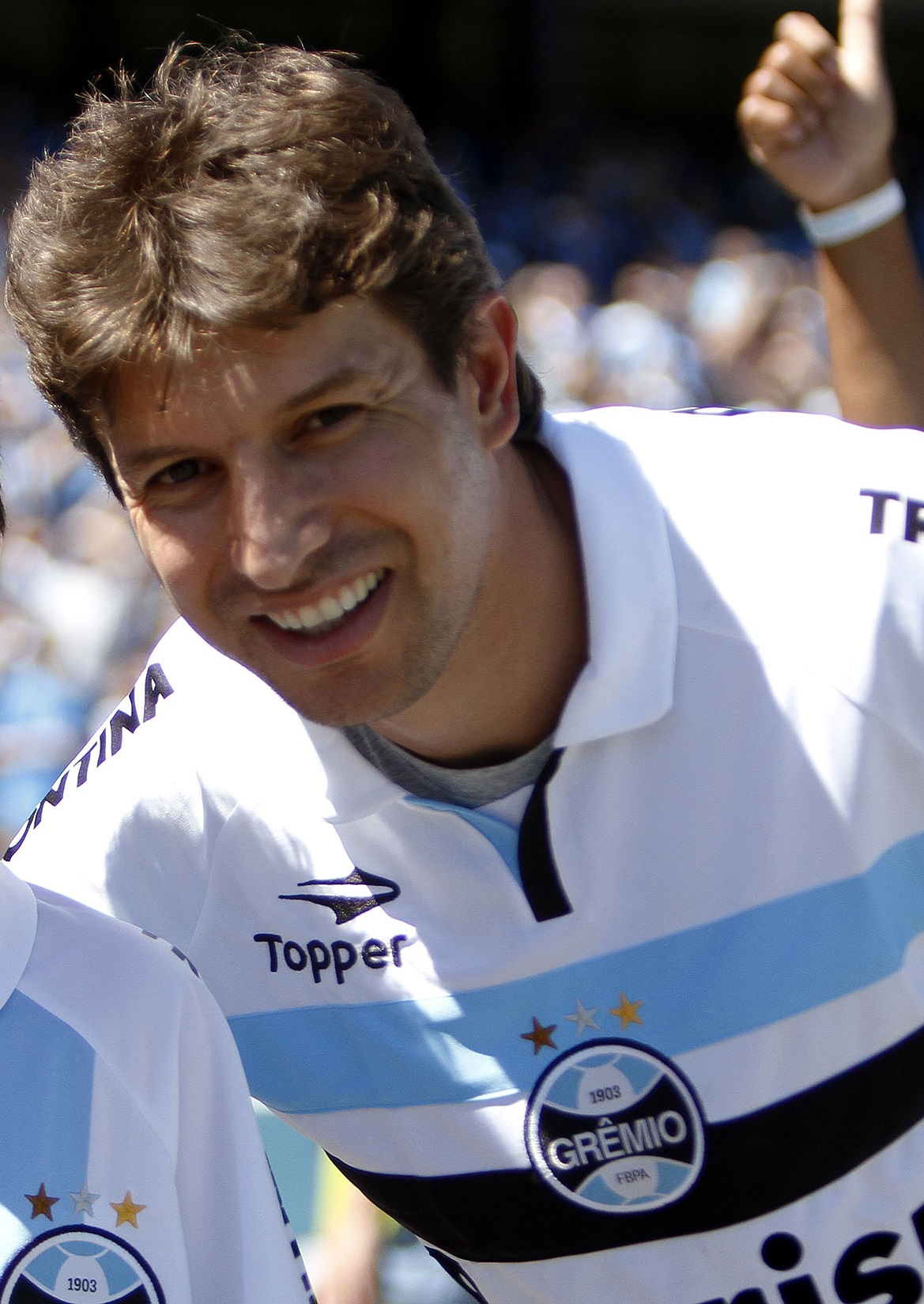
- Tcheco in 2005

Personal information
- Full name: Anderson Simas Luciano
- Date of birth: 11 April 1976 (age 50)
- Place of birth: Curitiba, Paraná, Brazil
- Height: 1.80 m (5 ft 11 in)
- Position: Midfielder

Team information
- Current team: Paraná (head coach)

Youth career
- 1985–1995: Paraná

Senior career*
Years	Team	Apps	(Gls)
1996–1999	Paraná		(4)
1998	→ Esportivo (loan)	6	(0)
2000–2001	Malutrom		(13)
2002–2003	Coritiba	56	(12)
2003–2005	Al-Ittihad	61	(19)
2005	→ Santos (loan)	13	(0)
2006–2007	Grêmio	81	(25)
2008	Al-Ittihad	9	(0)
2008–2009	Grêmio	71	(15)
2010	Corinthians	21	(0)
2010	→ Coritiba (loan)	12	(0)
2011–2012	Coritiba	61	(4)

Managerial career
- 2012–2013: Coritiba (assistant)
- 2013: Coritiba (interim)
- 2014–2016: Coritiba U23
- 2017: Paraná (assistant)
- 2018: Coritiba (assistant)
- 2018: Coritiba (interim)
- 2018: Coritiba
- 2019: Barra-SC
- 2020: Rio Branco-PR
- 2021–2022: FC Cascavel
- 2023: Azuriz
- 2023: Caxias
- 2024: Paraná
- 2024: Chapecoense
- 2025: Paraná
- 2025: FC Cascavel
- 2026–: Paraná
- * Club domestic league appearances and goals

Anderson Simas Luciano (born 11 April 1976), commonly known as Tcheco, is a Brazilian football coach and former midfielder. He is the current head coach of Paraná.

== Early life ==
Born in Curitiba, Paraná, as a child, he tried to mimic the interjection "tchê" from a neighbour but said tcheco instead. His grandmother noticed this and nicknamed him "Tcheco".

== Playing career ==
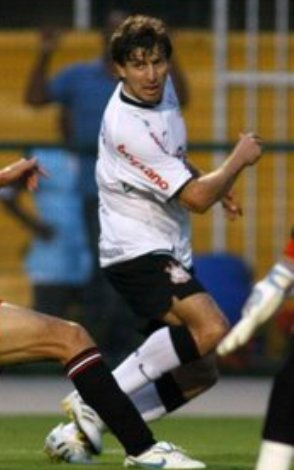
Tcheco playing for Corinthians in 2010

Tcheco began his career with hometown side Paraná Clube, but never established himself as a regular starter and was briefly loaned to Esportivo in 1998.

Tcheco moved to Malutrom in 2000, becoming a regular starter as they won the Group Green and White of the Copa João Havelange. He joined Coritiba in May 2002, and scored 11 goals in the 2003 season before departing for Saudi club Al-Ittihad in September of that year.

On 8 January 2005, Tcheco returned to his home country after agreeing to a one-year loan deal with Santos. He then returned to his parent club, before signing for Grêmio ahead of the 2006 season.

Tcheco returned to Al-Ittihad in December 2007, but was presented back at Grêmio the following 3 June. On 10 December 2009, he was confirmed as an addition of Corinthians for the upcoming campaign, but returned to Coxa on 7 September 2010.

Initially on loan, Tcheco subsequently signed a permanent deal with Coritiba, and retired at the age of 36 in July 2012.

== Coaching career ==
Shortly after retiring, Tcheco became an assistant coach for Coritiba. On 17 November 2013, he was named head coach of the club for the remaining three matches of the season, managing to save them from relegation.

Tcheco was subsequently in charge of the Coxa's under-23 squad and left the club in March 2016 after the team was disbanded. He returned to his first club Paraná in December to work as a football executive, being later also an assistant coach.

On 20 December 2017, Tcheco returned to Coritiba as an assistant. He was again an interim the following April, after Sandro Forner was sacked, before being permanently named head coach of the club on 13 August, in the place of Eduardo Baptista.

Tcheco left Coritiba in November 2018, before being named head coach of Barra-SC the following 12 April. On 24 September 2019, he took over Rio Branco-PR, but was dismissed amidst the COVID-19 pandemic in Brazil.

On 22 December 2020, Tcheco was appointed FC Cascavel head coach for the upcoming campaign. He left the club by mutual consent on 4 August 2022, before taking over Azuriz on 3 November.

Tcheco left Azuriz on 1 March 2023, and was named at the helm of Caxias on 13 April. He left on 20 June, after just nine matches.

Tcheco returned to Paraná on 16 February 2024, now as head coach of the first team. He left on 5 August after achieving promotion from the Campeonato Paranaense Série Prata as champions to take over Série B side Chapecoense, but was dismissed after just 13 days.

== Honours ==
=== Player ===
Paraná

- Campeonato Paranaense: 1997

Coritiba

- Campeonato Paranaense: 2003, 2011, 2012
- Campeonato Brasileiro Série B: 2010

Al Ittihad

- AFC Champions League: 2004, 2005
- Saudi Crown Prince Cup: 2004
- Arab Champions League: 2005

Grêmio

- Campeonato Gaúcho: 2006, 2007

=== Coach ===
Paraná

- Campeonato Paranaense Série Prata: 2024
