= 2004–05 Arab Champions League =

دوري أبطال العرب 2004–05

Tournament details
- Dates: 20 September 2004 – 1 July 2005
- Teams: 32 (from 1 association)

Final positions
- Champions: (Saudi Arabia) Al-Ittihad Jeddah (1st title)
- Runners-up: (Tunisia) CS Sfaxien
- Third place: (Saudi Arabia) Al-Hilal
- Fourth place: (Saudi Arabia) Al-Ahli Jeddah

Tournament statistics
- Matches played: 96
- Goals scored: 248 (2.58 per match)

The 2004–05 Arab Champions League was the second edition of a new format called Arab Champions League replacing the former Arab Unified Club Championship. The teams represented Arab nations from Africa and Asia. Al-Ittihad Jeddah of Saudi Arabia won the final against CS Sfaxien of Tunisia.

The competition's sponsor ART invited Iraq's Al-Talaba to compete. The Iraqi FA then nominated two other clubs (Erbil SC and Najaf FC, leaders of the Northern and Southern groups when the domestic championship was abandoned in spring 2004) to participate alongside Al-Talaba, but UAFA only allowed Al-Talaba to compete. The Iraqi FA then withdrew Al-Talaba from the tournament and were subsequently suspended from UAFA.

== First round ==
Al-Hussein SC (Irbid) apparently replaced Al-Wehdat SC.

Team 1	Agg.	Team 2	1st leg	2nd leg
Nejmeh SC (Lebanon)	1–7	(Tunisia) CS Sfaxien	0–1	1–6
Al-Karamah (Syria)	0–1	(Egypt) Zamalek SC	0–0	0–1
Al-Muharraq SC (Bahrain)	2–3	(Algeria) MC Alger	0–1	2–2
Kuwait SC	2–1	(Morocco) AS Salé	2–0	0–1
Al-Ahli Doha (Qatar)	5–1	(Jordan) Al-Hussein SC (Irbid)	3–0	2–1
Al-Ittihad Jeddah (Saudi Arabia)	12–0	(Yemen) Shaab Ibb	10–0	2–0
ASAC Concorde (Mauritania)	0–4	(Algeria) ES Sétif	0–2	0–2
Olympic Azzaweya (Libya)	1–4	(Egypt) Ghazl El-Mahalla	1–2	0–2
Al-Hilal (Saudi Arabia)	18–0	(Djibouti) Gendarmerie Nationale FC	11–0	7–0
Al-Qadsia (Kuwait)	1–1 (a)	(Jordan) Al-Faisaly	1–1	0–0
Tishreen (Syria)	0–5	(Egypt) Al-Ismaily	0–3	0–2
Al-Ahed (Lebanon)	1–3	(Tunisia) Club Africain	1–1	0–2
Al-Ittihad Tripoli (Libya)	1–3	(Algeria) NA Hussein Dey	1–2	0–1
Muscat Club (Oman)	3–4	(Tunisia) CA Bizertin	1–1	1–3
Al-Aqsa SC (Palestine)	2–4	(Saudi Arabia) Al-Ahli Jeddah	1–3	1–1
Riffa SC (Bahrain)	1–3	(Morocco) Wydad Casablanca	0–1	1–2

== Group stage ==
=== Group A ===
Team	Pld	W	D	L	GF	GA	GD	Pts	CSS	MCA	ZSC	KSC
(Tunisia) CS Sfaxien	6	4	1	1	13	3	+10	13		4–0	2–0	1–0
(Algeria) MC Alger	6	3	1	2	6	12	−6	10	2–1		0–0	3–2
(Egypt) Zamalek SC	6	2	3	1	9	5	+4	9	1–1	5–0		2–1
Kuwait SC	6	0	1	5	4	12	−8	1	0–4	0–1	1–1	

Legend: Blue = home team win; Yellow = draw; Red = away team win.

=== Group B ===
Team	Pld	W	D	L	GF	GA	GD	Pts	ITT	AHL	ESS	GHA
(Saudi Arabia) Al-Ittihad Jeddah	6	4	1	1	12	6	+6	13		1–1	2–0	2–1
(Qatar) Al-Ahli Doha	6	2	3	1	8	6	+2	9	3–2		1–1	2–0
(Algeria) ES Sétif	6	2	2	2	4	5	−1	8	0–2	1–0		2–0
(Egypt) Ghazl El-Mahalla	6	0	2	4	3	10	−7	2	1–3	1–1	0–0	

Legend: Blue = home team win; Yellow = draw; Red = away team win.

=== Group C ===
Team	Pld	W	D	L	GF	GA	GD	Pts	ISC	HIL	CAF	FAI
(Egypt) Al-Ismaily	6	5	1	0	11	5	+6	16		2–0	2–1	2–1
(Saudi Arabia) Al-Hilal	6	2	2	2	8	8	0	8	1–1		3–1	2–1
(Tunisia) Club Africain	6	2	1	3	5	7	−2	7	1–2	1–0		0–0
(Jordan) Al-Faisaly	6	0	2	4	5	9	−4	2	1–2	2–2	0–1	

Legend: Blue = home team win; Yellow = draw; Red = away team win.

=== Group D ===
Team	Pld	W	D	L	GF	GA	GD	Pts	WAC	AHL	NAHD	CAB
(Morocco) Wydad Casablanca	6	2	3	1	7	4	+3	9		1–1	3–0	1–0
(Saudi Arabia) Al-Ahli Jeddah	6	1	5	0	6	5	+1	8	1–1		1–1	1–0
(Algeria) NA Hussein Dey	6	1	4	1	9	9	0	7	1–1	2–2		3–0
(Tunisia) CA Bizertin	6	1	2	3	3	7	−4	5	1–0	0–0	2–2	

Legend: Blue = home team win; Yellow = draw; Red = away team win.

== Knock-out stage ==
Quarterfinals
(Saudi Arabia) Al-Ahli Jeddah	2	0	2
(Egypt) Al-Ismaily	0	1	1
(Qatar) Al-Ahli Doha	1	1	2
(Tunisia) CS Sfaxien	2	2	4
(Saudi Arabia) Al-Hilal	1	1	2
(Morocco) Wydad AC	0	1	1
(Algeria) MC Alger	1	0	1 (4)
(Saudi Arabia) Al-Ittihad (p)	0	1	1 (5)

Semifinals
(Saudi Arabia) Al-Ahli Jeddah	0	4	4
(Tunisia) CS Sfaxien	3	4	7
(Saudi Arabia) Al-Hilal	0	1	1
(Saudi Arabia) Al-Ittihad	1	2	3

Finals
(Tunisia) CS Sfaxien	0	1	1
(Saudi Arabia) Al-Ittihad	2	2	4
Third place
(Saudi Arabia) Al-Hilal	3	2	5
(Saudi Arabia) Al-Ahli Jeddah	1	2	3

=== Quarterfinals ===
4 April 2005

Al-Ahli Doha (Qatar)	1–2	(Tunisia) CS Sfaxien
Bouden 89'		Guemamdia 45'; Essafi 71'

Hamad bin Khalifa Stadium, Doha
20 April 2005

CS Sfaxien (Tunisia)	2–1	(Qatar) Al-Ahli Doha
Taher 8' (o.g.); Kouassi 38'		Jawhar 57'

Stade Taïeb Mhiri, Sfax

CS Sfaxien won 4–2 on aggregate.

4 April 2005

MC Alger (Algeria)	1–0	(Saudi Arabia) Al-Ittihad
Benali 73'

Stade du 5 Juillet, Algiers
20 April 2005

Al-Ittihad (Saudi Arabia)	1–0	(Algeria) MC Alger
Idris 90'
Penalties
	5–4

Prince Abdullah Al Faisal Stadium, Jeddah

Al-Ittihad 1–1 MC Alger on aggregate. Al-Ittihad won 5–4 on penalties.

4 April 2005

Al-Ahli Jeddah (Saudi Arabia)	2–0	(Egypt) Al-Ismaily
Pereira 47', 90' (pen.)

Prince Abdullah Al Faisal Stadium, Jeddah
20 April 2005

Al-Ismaily (Egypt)	1–0	(Saudi Arabia) Al-Ahli Jeddah
Abd-Rabou 5'

Ismailia Stadium, Ismailia

Al-Ahli Jeddah won 2–1 on aggregate.

4 April 2005

Al-Hilal (Saudi Arabia)	1–0	(Morocco) Wydad Casablanca
Al-Jaber 14'

King Fahd Stadium, Riyadh
20 April 2005

Wydad Casablanca (Morocco)	1–1	(Saudi Arabia) Al-Hilal
Madihi 65'		Al-Shalhoub 26'

Stade Mohammed V, Casablanca

Al-Hilal won 2–1 on aggregate.

=== Semifinals ===
5 May 2005

Al-Ahli Jeddah (Saudi Arabia)	0–3	(Tunisia) CS Sfaxien
		Ba 55'; Kouassi 81'; Essafi 90+4'

Prince Abdullah Al Faisal Stadium, Jeddah
18 May 2005

CS Sfaxien (Tunisia)	4–4	(Saudi Arabia) Al-Ahli Jeddah
Guemamdia 9', 90'; Massaoud 28'; Nafti 64'		Kim 24', 55'; Lúcio Flávio 75'; Al-Meshal 82'

Stade Taïeb Mhiri, Sfax

CS Sfaxien won 7–4 on aggregate.

5 May 2005

Al-Hilal (Saudi Arabia)	0–1	(Saudi Arabia) Al-Ittihad
		Al-Waked 60'

King Fahd Stadium, Riyadh
18 May 2005

Al-Ittihad (Saudi Arabia)	2–1	(Saudi Arabia) Al-Hilal
Al-Montashari 29'; Al-Eissa 40'		Camacho 73'

Prince Abdullah Al Faisal Stadium, Jeddah

Al-Ittihad won 3–1 on aggregate.

=== Third place match ===
25 June 2005

Al-Hilal (Saudi Arabia)	3–1	(Saudi Arabia) Al-Ahli Jeddah
Al-Mofarij 53'; Camacho 60'; Al-Jaber 87'		Pereira 75'

King Fahd Stadium, Riyadh
30 June 2005

Al-Ahli Jeddah (Saudi Arabia)	2–2	(Saudi Arabia) Al-Hilal
Al-Muhamadi 68'; Al-Abdullah 90+3'		Al-Anbar 64'; Al-Temyat 67'

Prince Abdullah Al Faisal Stadium, Jeddah

Al-Hilal won 5–3 on aggregate.

=== Final ===
24 June 2005

CS Sfaxien (Tunisia)	0–2	(Saudi Arabia) Al-Ittihad Jeddah
		Al-Shahrani 63', 90'

Stade Taïeb Mhiri, Sfax
Referee: Jassem Al-Heel (Qatar)
1 July 2005

Al-Ittihad Jeddah (Saudi Arabia)	2–1	(Tunisia) CS Sfaxien
Gharbi 11' (o.g.); Noor 23'		Khammassi 42'

Prince Abdullah Al Faisal Stadium, Jeddah
Referee: Mohamed Guezzaz (Morocco)

Al-Ittihad won 4–1 on aggregate.

== Winners ==
2004–05 Arab Champions League
(Saudi Arabia)
Al-Ittihad Jeddah
First title
