= Omer Al Mehannah =

Saudi Arabian football referee

Omer Saleh Al Mehannah
- Full name: Omer Saleh Al Mehannah
- Born: December 31, 1959 (age 66); Saudi Arabia

International
| Years | League | Role |
| 1990s | FIFA-listed | Referee |

Omer Saleh Al Mehannah (Arabic: عمر المهنا; born December 31, 1959) is a football referee from Saudi Arabia. He has also officiated the football tournament in the 1996 Summer Olympics in Atlanta.
