= 2000–01 Saudi Premier League =

Saudi Premier League
- Season: 2000–01
- Champions: Al-Ittihad (5th title)
- Relegated: Al-Qadsiah; Sdoos
- Asian Club Championship: Al-Ittihad
- Top goalscorer: Paulo Silva (13 goals)

Statistics of the 2000–01 Saudi Premier League.

== Clubs ==
Locations of teams in the 2000-01 Saudi Professional League

Club	Location	Stadium	Head coach
Al-Ahli	Jeddah	Prince Abdullah Al-Faisal Sports City	(Croatia) Luka Peruzović
Al-Ansar	Medina	Prince Mohamed bin Abdulaziz Stadium	
Al-Ettifaq	Dammam	Prince Mohamed bin Fahd Stadium	
Al-Hilal	Riyadh	King Fahd Sports City	(Bosnia and Herzegovina) Safet Sušić
Al-Ittihad	Jeddah	Prince Abdullah Al-Faisal Sports City	(Brazil) Oscar
Al-Najma	Unaizah	Department of Education Stadium	(Romania) Dudu Georgescu
Al-Nassr	Riyadh	King Fahd Sports City	(Portugal) Artur Jorge
Al-Qadsiah	Khobar	Prince Saud bin Jalawi Sports City	(Brazil) Cabralzinho
Al-Riyadh	Riyadh	King Fahd Sports City	
Al-Shabab	Riyadh	King Fahd Sports City	(Federal Republic of Yugoslavia) Ivica Todorov
Al-Wehda	Mecca	King Abdulaziz Sports City	(Tunisia) Adel Latrach
Sdoos	Riyadh	King Fahd Sports City	

=== Foreign players ===
Club	Player 1	Player 2	Player 3	Player 4	Former players
Al-Ahli	(Kuwait) Ahmad Al Subaih	(Mali) Mahamadou Sidibé	(Senegal) Diéne Faye	(Tunisia) Maher Kanzari	(Argentina) Raúl Gordillo
Al-Ansar					
Al-Ettifaq	(Angola) Paulo Silva	(Mali) Sadio Traoré			(Kuwait) Faraj Laheeb
Al-Hilal	(Brazil) Rôni	(Brazil) Túlio	(Colombia) Ricardo Pérez	(Liberia) Christopher Wreh	(Brazil) Sérgio Ricardo (Nigeria) Ayuba Mbwas Mangut (Senegal) Diéne Faye
Al-Ittihad	(Argentina) Marcelo Gómez	(Brazil) Sérgio Ricardo	(Italy) Michele Gelsi	(Nigeria) Mutiu Adepoju	(Brazil) Gerson
Al-Najma	(Ghana) Isaac Kwakye				
Al-Nassr	(Algeria) Moussa Saïb	(Brazil) Doriva	(Brazil) Reinaldo	(Tunisia) Mehdi Ben Slimane	(Brazil) Neizinho
Al-Qadsiah	(Brazil) Anderson	(Brazil) Wellington			
Al-Riyadh	(Brazil) Marcio Róbson	(Senegal) Oumar Traoré			
Al-Shabab	(Ivory Coast) Moussa Traoré	(Mali) Yaya Dissa	(Morocco) Mustapha Bidoudane	(Tunisia) Riadh Jelassi	(Morocco) Salah Sibouih
Al-Wehda	(Algeria) Hassen Ghoula	(Egypt) Ahmed Abdelzaher			(Brazil) Nei Bala
Sdoos	(Senegal) Mohammed Manga				

== Regular season table ==
Pos	Team	Pld	W	D	L	GF	GA	GD	Pts
1	Al-Ahli	22	15	6	1	50	19	+31	51
2	Al-Hilal	22	14	5	3	36	16	+20	44 (Note: 3 points deducted.)
3	Al-Nassr	22	12	5	5	34	19	+15	41
4	Al-Ittihad	22	11	5	6	35	23	+12	38
5	Al-Riyadh	22	8	6	8	23	24	−1	30
6	Al-Ansar	22	7	7	8	29	34	−5	28
7	Al-Shabab	22	7	6	9	28	29	−1	27
8	Al-Ettifaq	22	6	7	9	31	30	+1	25
9	Al-Wehda	22	6	4	12	25	44	−19	22
10	Al-Najma	22	5	5	12	12	30	−18	20
11	Al-Qadsiah	22	3	9	10	26	40	−14	18
12	Sdoos	22	4	3	15	16	37	−21	15

== Final four ==
=== Semifinals ===
==== First legs ====
18 April 2001	Al-Ahli	0–0	Al-Ittihad	Prince Abdullah Al-Faisal Sports City, Jeddah
				Referee: Abdul Rahman Al-Zaid

19 April 2001	Al-Nassr	1–0	Al-Hilal	King Fahd Sports City, Riyadh
	Doriva 76' (pen.)			Referee: Yousef Al-Aqeely

==== Second legs ====
25 April 2001	Al-Ittihad	4–2	Al-Ahli	Prince Abdullah Al-Faisal Sports City, Jeddah
	Sérgio Ricardo 20'; Sérgio Ricardo 41'; Mohammed Noor 36'; Sérgio Ricardo 95'		54' Obeid Al-Dosari; 87' Talal Al-Meshal	Referee: Ibrahim Al-Omar

26 April 2001	Al-Hilal	0–0	Al-Nassr	King Fahd Sports City, Riyadh
				Referee: Omer Al Mehannah

=== Final ===
9 May 2001	Al-Nassr	0–1	Al-Ittihad	King Fahd Sports City, Riyadh
			83' Hamzah Idris	Referee: Yousef Al-Aqeely

Saudi Premier League
2000–01 winners
Al-Ittihad
5th title

== Top scorers ==
Rank	Scorer	Club	Goals
1	(Angola) Paulo Silva	Al-Ettifaq	13
2	(Saudi Arabia) Ibrahim Suwayed	Al-Ahli	12
2	(Tunisia) Riadh Jelassi	Al-Shabab	12
