= Talal Al-Meshal =

Saudi Arabian footballer

Personal information
- Full name: Talal Saeed Al-Meshal
- Date of birth: 7 June 1978 (age 48)
- Place of birth: Jeddah, Saudi Arabia
- Height: 1.85 m (6 ft 1 in)
- Position: Striker

Senior career*
Years	Team	Apps	(Gls)
1996–2005	Al-Ahli	?	(58)
2006–2007	Al-Nassr	?	(8)
2007–2008	Al-Markhiya	0	(0)
2008–2010	Al-Ittihad		(9)
2010–2011	Al-Raed	3	(0)

International career
1998–2006	Saudi Arabia	60	(32)
- * Club domestic league appearances and goals

Talal Saeed Al-Meshal (Arabic: طَلَال سَعِيد الْمَشْعَل; born 7 June 1978) is a Saudi Arabian former footballer, who played for the national team from 1998 to 2006.

== Club career ==
A prolific striker, Al-Meshal played for Al-Ahli, Al-Nassr, Al-Ittihad, Al-Markhiya and Al-Raed football clubs. He played for Al-Ittihad at the 2008 AFC Champions League.

== International career ==
Al-Meshal played for the Saudi Arabia national football team and was a participant at the Asian Cup 2000, where he scored 3 goals as Saudi Arabia finished as runners-up.

=== International goals ===
Scores and results list saudi Arabia's goal tally first.

#	Date	Venue	Opponent	Result	Competition	Scored
1	31 May 2000	Győr, Hungary	Hungary	2-2	Friendly	1
2	23 September 2000	Riyadh, Saudi Arabia	Syria	2-1	Friendly	1
3	28 September 2000	Riyadh, Saudi Arabia	United Arab Emirates	6-1	Friendly	1
4	7 October 2000	Amman, Jordan	Kazakhstan	1-0	Friendly	1
5	24 October 2000	Beirut, Lebanon	Kuwait	3-2	2000 Asian Cup	1
6, 7	26 October 2000	Beirut, Lebanon	South Korea	2-1	2000 Asian Cup	2
8	30 January 2001	Dammam, Saudi Arabia	Syria	1-0	Friendly	1
9, 10	10 February 2001	Dammam, Saudi Arabia	Bangladesh	3-0	2002 World Cup qualifier	2
11, 12	12 February 2001	Dammam, Saudi Arabia	Vietnam	5-0	2002 World Cup qualifier	2
13	15 February 2001	Dammam, Saudi Arabia	Mongolia	6-0	2002 World Cup qualifier	1
14, 15, 16	17 February 2001	Dammam, Saudi Arabia	Bangladesh	6-0	2002 World Cup qualifier	3
17, 18, 19	19 February 2001	Dammam, Saudi Arabia	Vietnam	4-0	2002 World Cup qualifier	3
20	30 January 2002	Riyadh, Saudi Arabia	Qatar	3-1	2002 Gulf Cup	1
21	17 December 2002	Kuwait City, Kuwait	Bahrain	3-1	2002 Arab Cup	1
22	24 December 2002	Kuwait City, Kuwait	Syria	3-0	2002 Arab Cup	1
23	6 October 2003	Jeddah, Saudi Arabia	Yemen	7-0	2004 Asian Cup qualifier	1
24, 25, 26	10 October 2003	Jeddah, Saudi Arabia	Indonesia	5-0	2004 Asian Cup qualifier	3
27, 28	17 October 2003	Jeddah, Saudi Arabia	Indonesia	6-0	2004 Asian Cup qualifier	2
29	20 December 2003	Dammam, Saudi Arabia	Azerbaijan	1-0	Friendly	1
30, 31	9 June 2004	Riyadh, Saudi Arabia	Turkmenistan	3-0	2006 World Cup qualifier	2
32	12 October 2004	Jakarta, Indonesia	Indonesia	3-1	2006 World Cup qualifier	1
