= Saudi Arabia national football team results (2000–2009) =

This is a list of official football games played by Saudi Arabia national football team between 2000 and 2009.

== 2000 ==
21 May 2000 Friendly	Lebanon	0–0	Saudi Arabia	Beqaa Valley, Lebanon
16:00 (UTC+2)		Report		Stadium: Jamal Abdel Nasser Stadium; Referee: Ahmad Nabil Ayad (Lebanon)

24 May 2000 Friendly	Slovakia	1–1	Saudi Arabia	Nitra, Slovakia
18:30 (UTC+2)	Kožuch 37'	Report	Al-Temyat 12'	Stadium: Štadión pod Zoborom; Attendance: 2,117; Referee: Goran Marić (Croatia)

31 May 2000 Friendly	Hungary	2–2	Saudi Arabia	Győr, Hungary
20:30 (UTC+2)	Horváth 18', 79'	Report	Al-Meshal 90+1'; Al-Jaber 90+2'	Stadium: Stadion ETO; Attendance: 5,000; Referee: Drago Kos (Slovenia)

3 June 2000 Friendly	Slovenia	2–0	Saudi Arabia	Ljubljana, Slovenia
21:00 (UTC+2)	Zahovič 16'; Ačimovič 46'	Report		Stadium: Bežigrad Stadium; Attendance: 9,000; Referee: Trivković Edo (Croatia)

24 September 2000 Friendly	Saudi Arabia	2–1	Syria	Riyadh, Saudi Arabia
18:30 (UTC+3)	Al-Meshal 21'; Idris 27'	Report	Srour 50' (pen.)	Stadium: Prince Faisal bin Fahd Stadium; Referee: Abdulhameed Ebrahim (Bahrain)

26 September 2000 Friendly	Saudi Arabia	3–0	Syria	Riyadh, Saudi Arabia
18:30 (UTC+3)	Al-Temyat 13'; Al-Dosari 38', 46' (pen.)	Report		Stadium: Prince Faisal bin Fahd Stadium; Referee: Abdulaziz Al-Asali (Bahrain)

28 September 2000 Friendly	Saudi Arabia	6–1	United Arab Emirates	Riyadh, Saudi Arabia
18:30 (UTC+3)	Idris 31', 42'; Al-Temyat 35'; Zubromawi 38'; Al-Dosari 53'; Al-Meshal 77'	Report	Al Kass 74'	Stadium: Prince Faisal bin Fahd Stadium; Referee: Abdulhameed Ebrahim (Bahrain)

2 October 2000 Friendly	Jordan	1–0	Saudi Arabia	Amman, Jordan
19:00 (UTC+3)	Shelbaieh 49'	Report		Stadium: King Abdullah II Stadium

5 October 2000 Friendly	Saudi Arabia	2–0	China	Zarqa, Jordan
19:00 (UTC+3)	Al-Jaber 26'; Idris 83'	Report		Stadium: Prince Mohammed Stadium

7 October 2000 Friendly	Saudi Arabia	1–0	Kazakhstan	Amman, Jordan
19:00 (UTC+3)	Al-Meshal 49'	Report		Stadium: Amman International Stadium

14 October 2000 2000 Asian Cup GS	Saudi Arabia	1–4	Japan	Sidon, Lebanon
17:05 (UTC+2)	Morioka 90' (o.g.)	Report	Yanagisawa 22'; Takahara 37'; Nanami 53'; Ono 88'	Stadium: Saida Municipal Stadium; Attendance: 5,000; Referee: Ali Bujsaim (United Arab Emirates)

17 October 2000 2000 Asian Cup GS	Saudi Arabia	0–0	Qatar	Sidon, Lebanon
19:45 (UTC+2)		Report		Stadium: Saida Municipal Stadium; Attendance: 5,000; Referee: Tajaddin Fares (Syria)

20 October 2000 2000 Asian Cup GS	Saudi Arabia	5–0	Uzbekistan	Sidon, Lebanon
19:30 (UTC+2)	Al-Otaibi 18'; Al-Shalhoub 35', 78', 86'; Al-Temyat 88'	Report		Stadium: Saida Municipal Stadium; Attendance: 2,000; Referee: Kim Young-Joo (South Korea)

24 October 2000 2000 Asian Cup QF	Kuwait	2–3 (a.e.t.)	Saudi Arabia	Beirut, Lebanon
19:45 (UTC+2)	Bashar Abdullah 62'; Al-Huwaidi 68'	Report	Al-Temyat 45+1' 109'; Al-Meshal 72'	Stadium: Camille Chamoun Sports City Stadium; Attendance: 5,000; Referee: Brian Hall (United States)

26 October 2000 2000 Asian Cup SF	South Korea	1–2	Saudi Arabia	Beirut, Lebanon
16:45 (UTC+2)	Lee Dong-Gook 90+1'	Report	Al-Meshal 76', 80'	Stadium: Camille Chamoun Sports City Stadium; Attendance: 7,000; Referee: Saad Kamil Al-Fadhli (Kuwait)

29 October 2000 2000 Asian Cup F	Japan	1–0	Saudi Arabia	Beirut, Lebanon
19:45 (UTC+2)	Mochizuki 30'	Report		Stadium: Camille Chamoun Sports City Stadium; Attendance: 47,400; Referee: Ali Bujsaim (United Arab Emirates)

== 2001 ==
30 January 2001 Friendly	Saudi Arabia	1–0	Syria	Dammam, Saudi Arabia
19:45 (UTC+3)	Al-Meshal 45'	Report		Stadium: Prince Mohamed bin Fahd Stadium; Referee: Rahman Al-Delawar (Bahrain)

3 February 2001 Friendly	Saudi Arabia	3–1	Uganda	Dammam, Saudi Arabia
19:45 (UTC+3)	Al-Otaibi 18', 44'; Al-Yami 79'	Report	Kalungi 90'	Stadium: Prince Mohamed bin Fahd Stadium; Referee: Jaafar Al-Khabbaz (Bahrain)

8 February 2001 2002 WCQ	Saudi Arabia	6–0	Mongolia	Dammam, Saudi Arabia
20:30 (UTC+3)	Al-Shalhoub 10', 25'; Al-Dosari 23'; Abdulghani 30', 59'; Al-Otaibi 71'	Report		Stadium: Prince Mohamed bin Fahd Stadium; Attendance: 12,000; Referee: Jassim Al Hail (Qatar)

10 February 2001 2002 WCQ	Bangladesh	0–3	Saudi Arabia	Dammam, Saudi Arabia
20:30 (UTC+3)		Report	Al-Meshal 30', 85'; Al-Jaber 63'	Stadium: Prince Mohamed bin Fahd Stadium; Attendance: 5,000; Referee: Fareed Al-Marzouqi (United Arab Emirates)

12 February 2001 2002 WCQ	Saudi Arabia	5–0	Vietnam	Dammam, Saudi Arabia
20:30 (UTC+3)	Al-Meshal 17', 88'; Al-Jaber 29', 70', 90'	Report		Stadium: Prince Mohamed bin Fahd Stadium; Attendance: 3,000; Referee: Jaafaar Al-Khabbaz (Bahrain)

15 February 2001 2002 WCQ	Mongolia	0–6	Saudi Arabia	Dammam, Saudi Arabia
18:30 (UTC+3)		Report	Al-Jaber 20'; Al-Shalhoub 24'; Al-Meshal 28'; Al-Dosari 40', 86'; Al-Khilaiwi 76'	Stadium: Prince Mohamed bin Fahd Stadium; Attendance: 5,000; Referee: Salem Mujghef (Jordan)

17 February 2001 2002 WCQ	Saudi Arabia	6–0	Bangladesh	Dammam, Saudi Arabia
20:30 (UTC+3)	Harthi 5'; Al-Meshal 27', 28', 43'; Al-Dosari 33', 38'	Report		Stadium: Prince Mohamed bin Fahd Stadium; Attendance: 1,500; Referee: Abdullah Al-Harrasi (Oman)

19 February 2001 2002 WCQ	Vietnam	0–4	Saudi Arabia	Dammam, Saudi Arabia
20:30 (UTC+3)		Report	Al-Meshal 31', 71', 79'; Al-Dosari 88'	Stadium: Prince Mohamed bin Fahd Stadium; Attendance: 8,000; Referee: Salem Mujghef (Jordan)

10 July 2001 Friendly	Singapore	0–3	Saudi Arabia	Kallang, Singapore
20:00 (UTC+8)		Report	Al-Jaber 28', 37'; Al-Dosari 31'	Stadium: National Stadium; Referee: Vijay Rahman (Singapore)

19 July 2001 Friendly	Malaysia	0–4	Saudi Arabia	Kuala Lumpur, Malaysia
		Report	Bin Shehan 42'; Al-Otaibi 75'; Al-Dosari 79', 89'	Stadium: Kuala Lumpur Stadium

23 July 2001 Friendly	Saudi Arabia	1–0	North Korea	Kuala Lumpur, Malaysia
19:45 (UTC+3)	Al-Otaibi 20'	Report		Stadium: Kuala Lumpur Stadium

1 August 2001 Friendly	Saudi Arabia	1–1	Macedonia	Riyadh, Saudi Arabia
20:45 (UTC+3)	Al-Dosari 64'	Report	Maznov 34'	Stadium: Prince Faisal bin Fahd Stadium; Attendance: 8,000; Referee: Abdulrahman Al-Zaid (Saudi Arabia)

5 August 2001 Friendly	Saudi Arabia	1–2	Qatar	Riyadh, Saudi Arabia
20:45 (UTC+3)	Al-Dosari 38'	Report	Mustafa 24', 34'	Stadium: Prince Faisal bin Fahd Stadium; Referee: Qasem Shaban (Kuwait)

8 August 2001 Friendly	United Arab Emirates	0–1	Saudi Arabia	Abu Dhabi, United Arab Emirates
19:30 (UTC+4)		Report	Al-Shahrani 28'	Stadium: Al Nahyan Stadium; Referee: Ali Mandani (Kuwait)

17 August 2001 2002 WCQ	Saudi Arabia	1–1	Bahrain	Riyadh, Saudi Arabia
20:30 (UTC+3)	Al-Dosari 84'	Report	Salmeen 18'	Stadium: Prince Faisal bin Fahd Stadium; Attendance: 45,000; Referee: Saad Kamil Al-Fadhli (Kuwait)

24 August 2001 2002 WCQ	Iran	2–0	Saudi Arabia	Tehran, Iran
19:15 (UTC+04:30)	Daei 54' (pen.), 64'	Report		Stadium: Azadi Stadium; Attendance: 120,000; Referee: Simon Micallef (Australia)

31 August 2001 2002 WCQ	Saudi Arabia	1–0	Iraq	Manama, Bahrain (Note: Matches between teams from Iraq and Saudi Arabia are played on neutral venues due to deterioration of Iraq–Saudi Arabia relations.)
20:30 (UTC+3)	Al-Dosari 45'	Report		Stadium: Bahrain National Stadium; Attendance: 10,000; Referee: Lu Jun (China)

7 September 2001 Friendly	Saudi Arabia	0–2	United Arab Emirates	Dammam, Saudi Arabia
18:00 (UTC+3)		Report	Al-Anbari 75'; Rashed 89'	Stadium: Prince Mohamed bin Fahd Stadium; Referee: Abdulaziz Al-Dokahil (Saudi Arabia)

15 September 2001 2002 WCQ	Thailand	1–3	Saudi Arabia	Bangkok, Thailand
18:30 (UTC+7)	Pituratana 28'	Report	Al-Jaber 47'; Bin Shehan 63'; Al-Dosari 70'	Stadium: Rajamangala Stadium; Attendance: 18,000; Referee: Naotsugu Fuse (Japan)

21 September 2001 2002 WCQ	Bahrain	0–4	Saudi Arabia	Manama, Bahrain
18:30 (UTC+3)		Report	Al-Dosari 26'; Bin Shehan 28'; Al-Waked 41'; Al-Jaber 89'	Stadium: Bahrain National Stadium; Attendance: 35,000; Referee: Ali Bujsaim (United Arab Emirates)

28 September 2001 2002 WCQ	Saudi Arabia	2–2	Iran	Jeddah, Saudi Arabia
20:30 (UTC+3)	Al-Waked 20' (pen.); Al-Yami 59'	Report	Daei 42'; Dinmohammadi 84'	Stadium: Prince Abdullah Al Faisal Stadium; Attendance: 30,000; Referee: Carlos Eugênio Simon (Brazil)

5 October 2001 2002 WCQ	Iraq	1–2	Saudi Arabia	Amman, Jordan
18:00 (UTC+3)	Al-Hail 31'	Report	Shehan 1', 77'	Stadium: Amman International Stadium; Attendance: 17,000; Referee: Óscar Ruiz (Colombia)

21 October 2001 2002 WCQ	Saudi Arabia	4–1	Thailand	Riyadh, Saudi Arabia
19:35 (UTC+3)	Shehan 40'; Jumaan 50'; Al-Jaber 66' (pen.); Al-Harbi 73'	Report	Piturat 58'	Stadium: Prince Faisal bin Fahd Stadium; Attendance: 27,000; Referee: Brian Hall (United States)

30 December 2001 Friendly	Saudi Arabia	0–2	Zimbabwe	Riyadh, Saudi Arabia
19:45 (UTC+3)		Report	Nyandoro 30'; Ben Katanha 75'	Stadium: Prince Faisal bin Fahd Stadium; Referee: Mojeb Al-Dossari (Saudi Arabia)

== 2002 ==
5 January 2002 Friendly	Saudi Arabia	2–0	Romania	Saudi Arabia

10 January 2002 Friendly	Saudi Arabia	1–0	Iceland	Riyadh, Saudi Arabia
		Report		Stadium: Prince Faisal bin Fahd Stadium; Attendance: 1,000; Referee: Omer Al Mehannah (Saudi Arabia)

16 January 2002 15th AGC	Saudi Arabia	1–1	Kuwait	Riyadh, Saudi Arabia
				Stadium: King Fahd International Stadium

20 January 2002 15th AGC	Saudi Arabia	3–1	Bahrain	Riyadh, Saudi Arabia
				Stadium: King Fahd International Stadium

24 January 2002 15th AGC	United Arab Emirates	0–1	Saudi Arabia	Riyadh, Saudi Arabia
				Stadium: King Fahd International Stadium

27 January 2002 15th AGC	Saudi Arabia	2–0	Oman	Riyadh, Saudi Arabia
				Stadium: King Fahd International Stadium

30 January 2002 15th AGC	Qatar	1–3	Saudi Arabia	Riyadh, Saudi Arabia
				Stadium: King Fahd International Stadium

6 February 2002 Friendly	Saudi Arabia	0–1	Brazil	Riyadh, Saudi Arabia
			Djalminha 73'	Stadium: King Fahd International Stadium; Attendance: 55,000

13 February 2002 Friendly	Saudi Arabia	0–1	Denmark	Riyadh, Saudi Arabia
		Report	Sand 17'	Stadium: King Fahd International Stadium; Attendance: 7,000; Referee: Qasim Shaaban (Kuwait)

14 March 2002 Friendly	Estonia	2–0	Saudi Arabia	Montecatini Terme, Italy
	Zelinski 9'; Oper 51'	Report		Stadium: Stadio Enzo Mazotti; Attendance: 500; Referee: Paolo Dondarini (Italy)

20 March 2002 Friendly	Saudi Arabia	1–0	South Africa	Italy

27 March 2002 Friendly	Saudi Arabia	3–2	Uruguay	Saudi Arabia

14 May 2002 Friendly	Saudi Arabia	3–2	Senegal	Saudi Arabia

1 June 2002 2002 World Cup GS	Germany	8–0	Saudi Arabia	Sapporo, Japan
20:30 (UTC+9)	Klose 20', 25', 70'; Ballack 40'; Jancker 45+1'; Linke 73'; Bierhoff 84'; Schneider 90+1'			Stadium: Sapporo Dome; Attendance: 32,218; Referee: Ubaldo Aquino (Paraguay)

6 June 2002 2002 World Cup GS	Cameroon	1–0	Saudi Arabia	Saitama, Japan
18:00 (UTC+9)	Eto'o 66'			Stadium: Saitama Stadium; Attendance: 52,328; Referee: Terje Hauge (Norway)

11 June 2002 2002 World Cup GS	Saudi Arabia	0–3	Republic of Ireland	Yokohama, Japan
20:30 (UTC+9)			Robbie Keane 7'; Breen 61'; Duff 87'	Stadium: International Stadium Yokohama; Attendance: 65,320; Referee: Falla N'Doye (Senegal)

13 December 2002 Friendly	Saudi Arabia	1–1	Lebanon	Saudi Arabia

17 December 2002 2002 Arab Nations Cup	Saudi Arabia	2–1	Bahrain	Kuwait

19 December 2002 2002 Arab Nations Cup	Saudi Arabia	1–0	Lebanon	Kuwait

24 December 2002 2002 Arab Nations Cup	Syria	0–3	Saudi Arabia	Kuwait

26 December 2002 2002 Arab Nations Cup	Yemen	2–2	Saudi Arabia	Kuwait

30 December 2002 2002 Arab Nations Cup	Saudi Arabia	1–0 (a.e.t.)	Bahrain	Kuwait

== 2003 ==
30 April 2003 Friendly	Liechtenstein	1–0	Saudi Arabia	Vaduz, Liechtenstein
17:30 (UTC+2)	Burgmeier 22'	Report		Stadium: Rheinpark Stadion; Attendance: 1,200; Referee: René Rogalla (Switzerland)

30 September 2003 Friendly	Saudi Arabia	1–1	Syria	Jeddah, Saudi Arabia
20:00 (UTC+3)	Al Bashah 18'	Report	Al-Sayed 47'	Stadium: Prince Abdullah Al Faisal Stadium; Referee: Khalil Al-Ghamdi (Saudi Arabia)

6 October 2003 2004 Asian Cup Q	Saudi Arabia	7–0	Yemen	Jeddah, Saudi Arabia
18:30 (UTC+3)	Al Bashah 16', 18', 24', 35'; Noor 65'; Al-Shalhoub 73' (pen.); Al-Meshal 80'	Report		Stadium: Prince Abdullah Al Faisal Stadium; Referee: Basel Al-Hajjar (Syria)

8 October 2003 2004 Asian Cup Q	Saudi Arabia	6–0	Bhutan	Jeddah, Saudi Arabia
20:30 (UTC+3)	Al Bashah 7'; Jumaa 9', 25'; Al-Qahtani 28'; Al-Janoubi 43'; Wadaani 90'	Report		Stadium: Prince Abdullah Al Faisal Stadium

10 October 2003 2004 Asian Cup Q	Saudi Arabia	5–0	Indonesia	Jeddah, Saudi Arabia
18:30 (UTC+3)	Al-Meshal 38', 55', 56'; Al Bashah 47', 49'	Report		Stadium: Prince Abdullah Al Faisal Stadium; Referee: Mohamad Mansour (Lebanon)

13 October 2003 2004 Asian Cup Q	Yemen	1–3	Saudi Arabia	Jeddah, Saudi Arabia
18:30 (UTC+3)	Ahmad 11'	Report	Al-Montashari 17'; Al-Waked 20'; Al-Shalhoub 83' ([pen.)	Stadium: Prince Abdullah Al Faisal Stadium; Referee: Mohamad Mansour (Lebanon)

15 October 2003 2004 Asian Cup Q	Bhutan	0–4	Saudi Arabia	Jeddah, Saudi Arabia
20:30 (UTC+3)		Report	Jumaan 4', 25', 79'; Tamim 40' (pen.)	Stadium: Prince Abdullah Al Faisal Stadium; Referee: Jaafar Al-Khabbaz (Bahrain)

17 October 2003 2004 Asian Cup Q	Indonesia	0–6	Saudi Arabia	Jeddah, Saudi Arabia
20:30 (UTC+3)		Report	Al-Meshal 21', 86'; Al-Shalhoub 45' (pen.); Noor 58'; Dokhi 78'; Al-Janoubi 90'	Stadium: Prince Abdullah Al Faisal Stadium; Referee: Nail Lutfullin (Uzbekistan)

17 December 2003 Friendly	Saudi Arabia	1–1	Estonia	Dammam, Saudi Arabia
17:30 (UTC+3)	Tukar 28'	Report	Zahovaiko 41'	Stadium: Prince Mohamed bin Fahd Stadium; Referee: Omer Al Mehannah (Saudi Arabia)

20 December 2003 Friendly	Saudi Arabia	1–0	Azerbaijan	Dammam, Saudi Arabia
19:30 (UTC+3)	Al-Meshal 85'	Report		Stadium: Prince Mohamed bin Fahd Stadium; Referee: Naser Al-Hamdan (Saudi Arabia)

26 December 2003 16th AGC	United Arab Emirates	0–2	Saudi Arabia	Kuwait City, Kuwait
18:35 (UTC+3)		Report	Al-Shalhoub 14' (pen.); Tukar 82'	Stadium: Al Kuwait Sports Club Stadium; Referee: Abdulhameed Ebrahim (Bahrain)

29 December 2003 16th AGC	Qatar	0–0	Saudi Arabia	Kuwait City, Kuwait
18:35 (UTC+3)		Report		Stadium: Al Kuwait Sports Club Stadium; Referee: Urs Meier (Switzerland)

== 2004 ==
1 January 2004 16th AGC	Bahrain	0–1	Saudi Arabia	Kuwait City, Kuwait
17:30 (UTC+3)	Al-Shahrani 73'	Report		Stadium: Al Kuwait Sports Club Stadium; Referee: Viktor Kassai (Hungary)

4 January 2004 16th AGC	Saudi Arabia	1–1	Kuwait	Kuwait City, Kuwait
17:30 (UTC+3)	Al-Shalhoub 76'	Report	Abdulqoddus 89'	Stadium: Al Kuwait Sports Club Stadium; Referee: Mohamed Omar Al Saeedi (United Arab Emirates)

6 January 2004 16th AGC	Oman	1–2	Saudi Arabia	Kuwait City, Kuwait
17:30 (UTC+3)	Al-Hosni 61'	Report	Noor 68'; Al-Qahtani 90'	Stadium: Al-Sadaqua Walsalam Stadium; Referee: Urs Meier (Switzerland)

8 January 2004 16th AGC	Yemen	0–2	Saudi Arabia	Kuwait City, Kuwait
18:35 (UTC+3)		Report	Al-Qahtani 8', 30'	Stadium: Al-Sadaqua Walsalam Stadium; Referee: Abdullah Al-Qahtani (Qatar)

18 February 2004 2006 WCQ	Saudi Arabia	3–0	Indonesia	Riyadh, Saudi Arabia
20:15 (UTC+3)	Al-Shahrani 4', 39'; Al-Qahtani 45'	Report		Stadium: King Fahd International Stadium; Attendance: 1,000; Referee: Naser Al Ghafary (Jordan)

31 March 2004 2006 WCQ	Sri Lanka	0–1	Saudi Arabia	Colombo, Sri Lanka
18:30 (UTC+5:30)		Report	Al-Shahrani 51'	Stadium: Sugathadasa Stadium; Attendance: 6,000; Referee: Kadyrbek Chynybekov (Kyrgyzstan)

9 June 2004 2006 WCQ	Saudi Arabia	3–0	Turkmenistan	Riyadh, Saudi Arabia
21:00 (UTC+3)	Al-Meshal 27', 45'; Noor 32'	Report		Stadium: King Fahd International Stadium; Attendance: 1,000; Referee: Adunyachart Khanthama (Thailand)

18 July 2004 2004 Asian Cup GS	Saudi Arabia	2–2	Turkmenistan	Chengdu, China
18:45 (UTC+8)	Al-Qahtani 9' (pen.), 59'		N. Bayramov 6'; Kulyýew 90+3'	Stadium: Sichuan Longquanyi Stadium; Attendance: 12,400; Referee: Chaiwat Kunsata (Thailand)

22 July 2004 2004 Asian Cup GS	Uzbekistan	1–0	Saudi Arabia	Chengdu, China
21:00 (UTC+8)	Geynrikh 13'			Stadium: Sichuan Longquanyi Stadium; Attendance: 22,000; Referee: Coffi Codjia (Benin)

26 July 2004 2004 Asian Cup GS	Saudi Arabia	1–2	Iraq	Chengdu, China
19:00 (UTC+8)	Al-Montashari 57'		Akram 51'; Mahmoud 86'	Stadium: Sichuan Longquanyi Stadium; Attendance: 15,000; Referee: Kwon Jong-Chul (South Korea)

1 September 2004 Friendly	Saudi Arabia	1–1	Kuwait	Saudi Arabia

8 September 2004 2006 WCQ	Turkmenistan	0–1	Saudi Arabia	Ashgabat, Turkmenistan
19:00 (UTC+5)		Report	Al-Qahtani 47'	Stadium: Olympic Stadium; Attendance: 5,000; Referee: Kwon Jong-chul (Korea Republic)

6 October 2004 Friendly	Saudi Arabia	2–2	Syria	Saudi Arabia

12 October 2004 2006 WCQ	Indonesia	1–3	Saudi Arabia	Jakarta, Indonesia
19:30 (UTC+7)	Jaya 50'	Report	Al-Meshal 9'; Abdulghani 13'; Al-Qahtani 80'	Stadium: Gelora Bung Karno; Attendance: 30,000; Referee: Subkhiddin Mohd Salleh (Malaysia)

17 November 2004 2006 WCQ	Saudi Arabia	3–0	Sri Lanka	Dammam, Saudi Arabia
20:00 (UTC+3)	Al-Harthi 6'; Al-Shalhoub 45' (pen.); Fallata 65'	Report		Stadium: Prince Mohamed bin Fahd Stadium; Attendance: 2,000; Referee: Muflah Mohamed (Oman)

11 December 2004 17th AGC	Saudi Arabia	1–2	Kuwait	Al Rayyan, Qatar
	Al-Qahtani 14'	Report	Neda 75'; Al-Mutawa 87'	Stadium: Ahmed bin Ali Stadium

14 December 2004 17th AGC	Yemen	0–2	Saudi Arabia	Al Rayyan, Qatar
		Report	Al-Otaibi 34'; Al-Shahrani 47' (pen.)	Stadium: Ahmed bin Ali Stadium

17 December 2004 17th AGC	Bahrain	3–0	Saudi Arabia	Al Rayyan, Qatar
	Al-Marzooqi 64'; Isa 78'; Yousef 90'	Report		Stadium: Ahmed bin Ali Stadium

== 2005 ==
25 January 2005 Friendly	Saudi Arabia	3–0	Tajikistan	Riyadh, Saudi Arabia
15:35 (UTC+3)	Idris 42'; Jumaan 61'; Al-Saqri 67'	Report		Stadium: Prince Faisal bin Fahd Stadium; Referee: Mojeb Al-Dossari (Saudi Arabia)

29 January 2005 Friendly	Saudi Arabia	1–0	Turkmenistan	Riyadh, Saudi Arabia
15:35 (UTC+3)	Al-Shamrani 90'	Report		Stadium: Prince Faisal bin Fahd Stadium; Referee: Mamdouh Al-Mirdasi (Saudi Arabia)

2 February 2005 Friendly	Hungary	0–0	Saudi Arabia	Istanbul, Turkey
16:00 (UTC+2)		Report		Stadium: Atatürk Olympic Stadium; Attendance: 100; Referee: Selçuk Dereli (Turkey)

9 February 2005 2006 WCQ	Uzbekistan	1–1	Saudi Arabia	Tashkent, Uzbekistan
15:45 (UTC+5)	Soliev 90+3'	Report	Al-Jaber 76'	Stadium: Pakhtakor Central Stadium; Attendance: 45,000; Referee: Toru Kamikawa (Japan)

14 March 2005 Friendly	Saudi Arabia	0–1	Egypt	Dammam, Saudi Arabia
20:30 (UTC+3)		Report	Moteab 64'	Stadium: Prince Mohamed bin Fahd Stadium; Referee: Jaafar Al-Khabbaz (Bahrain)

18 March 2005 Friendly	Saudi Arabia	1–4	Finland	Dammam, Saudi Arabia
20:30 (UTC+3)	Al Bashah 48'	Report	Kuivasto 4'; Kuqi 71', 78'; Nurmela 75'	Stadium: Prince Mohamed bin Fahd Stadium; Attendance: 8,000; Referee: Abdulrahman Al-Amri (Saudi Arabia)

25 March 2005 2006 WCQ	Saudi Arabia	2–0	South Korea	Dammam, Saudi Arabia
19:45 (UTC+3)	Kariri 29'; Al-Qahtani 73' (pen.)	Report		Stadium: Prince Mohamed bin Fahd Stadium; Attendance: 25,000; Referee: Subkhiddin Mohd Salleh (Malaysia)

30 March 2005 2006 WCQ	Kuwait	0–0	Saudi Arabia	Kuwait City, Kuwait
19:45 (UTC+3)		Report		Stadium: Kazma SC Stadium; Attendance: 25,000; Referee: Masoud Moradi (Iran)

9 April 2005 2005 Islamic Solidarity Games	Saudi Arabia	4–0	Yemen	Jeddah, Saudi Arabia
20:35 (UTC+3)	Al-Wadani 12'; Al-Harthi 28'; Hakami 71'; Ameen 88'			Stadium: Prince Abdullah al-Faisal Stadium

11 April 2005 2005 Islamic Solidarity Games	Saudi Arabia	3–0	Palestine	Jeddah, Saudi Arabia
17:50 (UTC+3)	Al-Harthi 71'; Ameen 81'; Bashir 84'			Stadium: Prince Abdullah al-Faisal Stadium

16 April 2005 2005 Islamic Solidarity Games	Saudi Arabia	2–1 (a.e.t.)	Oman	Saudi Arabia

18 April 2005 2005 Islamic Solidarity Games	Saudi Arabia	4–0	Syria	Saudi Arabia

20 April 2005 2005 Islamic Solidarity Games	Saudi Arabia	1–0	Morocco	Saudi Arabia

27 May 2005 Friendly	Saudi Arabia	1–1	Bahrain	Riyadh, Saudi Arabia
20:45 (UTC+3)	Kariri 34'	Report	Adnan 18' (pen.)	Stadium: King Fahd International Stadium; Referee: Khalil Al-Ghamdi (Saudi Arabia)

3 June 2005 2006 WCQ	Saudi Arabia	3–0	Kuwait	Riyadh, Saudi Arabia
21:05 (UTC+3)	Al-Shalhoub 19', 49'; Al-Harthi 83'	Report		Stadium: King Fahd International Stadium; Attendance: 72,000; Referee: Toru Kamikawa (Japan)

8 June 2005 2006 WCQ	Saudi Arabia	3–0	Uzbekistan	Riyadh, Saudi Arabia
21:05 (UTC+3)	Al-Jaber 8', 60'; Al-Harthi 87'	Report		Stadium: King Fahd International Stadium; Attendance: 72,000; Referee: Huang Junjie (China PR)

17 August 2005 2006 WCQ	South Korea	0–1	Saudi Arabia	Seoul, South Korea
20:05 (UTC+9)		Report	Al-Anbar 5'	Stadium: Seoul World Cup Stadium; Attendance: 61,586; Referee: Chaiwat Kunsuta (Thailand)

14 November 2005 Friendly	Saudi Arabia	1–3	Ghana	Jeddah, Saudi Arabia
20:00 (UTC+3)	Al-Temyat 36'	Report	Muntari 41'; Gyan 45', 70'	Stadium: Prince Abdullah Al Faisal Stadium; Referee: Mojeb Al-Dossari (Saudi Arabia)

3 December 2005 2005 West Asian Games	Saudi Arabia	2–0	Palestine	Al Rayyan, Qatar
	Al-Swaileh 18'; Al-Mehyani 22'			Stadium: Ahmed bin Ali Stadium; Referee: Nassir Al-Ghanim (Kuwait)

5 December 2005 2005 West Asian Games	Iraq	5–1	Saudi Arabia	Al Rayyan, Qatar
	Abdul-Amir 8'; E. Mohammed 19'; Akram 30'; Mahmoud 51' 78'		Naif Al-Qadi 53'	Stadium: Ahmed bin Ali Stadium; Referee: Abdullah Al-Hilali (Oman)

8 December 2005 2005 West Asian Games	Iraq	2–0	Saudi Arabia	Qatar
	Salah 33'; Farhan 85'

10 December 2005 2005 West Asian Games	Iran	2–1	Saudi Arabia	Qatar
	Borhani 2', 4'		Al-Abdullah 8'

== 2006 ==
18 January 2006 Friendly	Saudi Arabia	1–1	Sweden	Riyadh, Saudi Arabia
20:10 (UTC+3)	Ameen 71'	Report	Svensson 33'	Stadium: Prince Faisal bin Fahd Stadium; Attendance: 3,000; Referee: Abdul Rahman Al Amri (Saudi Arabia)

21 January 2006 LG Cup	Saudi Arabia	1–1	Finland	Riyadh, Saudi Arabia
20:10 (UTC+3)	Al-Shalhoub 58'	Report	Roiha 87'	Stadium: Prince Faisal bin Fahd Stadium; Attendance: 3,000; Referee: Naser Al Enezi (Kuwait)

25 January 2006 LG Cup	Saudi Arabia	1–1	Greece	Riyadh, Saudi Arabia
20:10 (UTC+3)	Aziz 89'	Report	Zagorakis 59' (pen.)	Stadium: Prince Faisal bin Fahd Stadium; Attendance: 2,900; Referee: Abdullah Balideh (Qatar)

27 January 2006 Friendly	Saudi Arabia	1–2	Lebanon	Riyadh, Saudi Arabia
19:30 (UTC+3)	Al-Mehyani 43'	Report	Ghaddar 19'; Nasseredine 85'	Stadium: Prince Faisal bin Fahad Stadium; Referee: Abdulrahman Al-Jarwan (Saudi Arabia)

14 February 2006 Friendly	Saudi Arabia	1–1	Syria	Jeddah, Saudi Arabia
16:20 (UTC+3)	Al-Qahtani 40'	Report	Al-Montashari 45' (o.g.)	Stadium: Prince Abdullah Al Faisal Stadium; Referee: Ali Al-Mutlaq (Saudi Arabia)

22 February 2006 2007 Asian Cup Q	Yemen	0–4	Saudi Arabia	Sana'a, Yemen
16:00 (UTC+3)		Report	Al Sawailh 14', 89'; Al-Shalhoub 77', 90+2'	Stadium: Ali Mohsen Stadium; Attendance: 55,000; Referee: Saad Kameel Al Fadhli (Kuwait)

1 March 2006 Friendly	Portugal	3–0	Saudi Arabia	Düsseldorf, Germany
20:45 (UTC+2)	Ronaldo 30', 86'; Maniche 45'	Report		Stadium: Esprit Arena; Attendance: 8,340; Referee: Wolfgang Stark (Germany)

15 March 2006 Friendly	Saudi Arabia	2–2	Iraq	Jeddah, Saudi Arabia
20:30 (UTC+3)	Al-Temyat 18'; Al-Jaber 59'	Report	Shakroun 28'; Abdul-Amir 90'	Stadium: Prince Abdullah Al Faisal Stadium; Referee: Nasser Al-Hamdan (Saudi Arabia)

28 March 2006 Friendly	Saudi Arabia	1–2	Poland	Riyadh, Saudi Arabia
20:30 (UTC+3)	Tukar 27'	Report	Sosin 7', 63'	Stadium: Prince Faisal bin Fahd Stadium; Attendance: 2,000; Referee: Ali Al Mutlaq (Saudi Arabia)

11 May 2006 Friendly	Belgium	2–1	Saudi Arabia	Sittard, Netherlands
20:15 (UTC+2)	Caluwé 3'; Vanden Borre 55'	Report	Goor 31' (o.g.)	Stadium: Fortuna Sittard Stadion; Attendance: 3,283; Referee: Ruud Bossen (Netherlands)

14 May 2006 Friendly	Saudi Arabia	1–0	Togo	Sittard, Netherlands
16:00 (UTC+2)	Mouath 85'	Report		Stadium: Fortuna Sittard Stadion

26 May 2006 Friendly	Czech Republic	2–0	Saudi Arabia	Innsbruck, Austria
18:00 (UTC+2)	Baroš 15'; Jankulovski 90' (pen.)	Report		Stadium: Tivoli-Neu; Attendance: 4,000; Referee: Einwaller (Austria)

31 May 2006 Friendly	Turkey	1–0	Saudi Arabia	Offenbach am Main, Germany
18:00 (UTC+2)	Ateş 59'	Report		Stadium: Stadion am Bieberer Berg; Attendance: 12,000; Referee: Helmut Fleischer (Germany)

14 June 2006 2006 World Cup GS	Tunisia	2–2	Saudi Arabia	Munich, Germany
18:00 (UTC+2)	Jaziri 23'; Jaïdi 90+2'	Report	Al-Qahtani 57'; Al-Jaber 84'	Stadium: FIFA WM Stadion München; Attendance: 66,000; Referee: Mark Shield (Australia)

19 June 2006 2006 World Cup GS	Saudi Arabia	0–4	Ukraine	Hamburg, Germany
18:00 (UTC+2)		Report	Rusol 4'; Rebrov 36'; Shevchenko 46'; Kalynychenko 84'	Stadium: FIFA WM Stadion Hamburg; Attendance: 50,000; Referee: Graham Poll (England)

23 June 2006 2006 World Cup GS	Saudi Arabia	0–1	Spain	Kaiserslautern, Germany
16:00 (UTC+2)		Report	Juanito 36'	Stadium: Fritz-Walter-Stadion; Attendance: 46,000; Referee: Coffi Codjia (Benin)

9 August 2006 Friendly	Saudi Arabia	1–0	Bahrain	Dammam, Saudi Arabia
20:30 (UTC+3)	Al-Qahtani 17'	Report		Stadium: Prince Mohamed bin Fahd Stadium; Referee: Khalil Al-Ghamdi (Saudi Arabia)

16 August 2006 2007 Asian Cup Q	India	0–3	Saudi Arabia	Kolkata, India
15:00 (UTC+5:30)		Report	Al-Qahtani 2', 19', 50'	Stadium: Saltlake Stadium; Attendance: 10,000; Referee: Satop Tongkhan (Thailand)

27 August 2006 Friendly	Saudi Arabia	1–0	United Arab Emirates	Jeddah, Saudi Arabia
21:00 (UTC+3)	Bashir 9'	Report		Stadium: Prince Abdullah Al-Faisal Stadium; Referee: Ali Al-Mutlaq (Saudi Arabia)

3 September 2006 2007 Asian Cup Q	Saudi Arabia	1–0	Japan	Jeddah, Saudi Arabia
20:30 (UTC+3)	Bashir 73'	Report		Stadium: Prince Abdullah Al-Faisal Stadium; Attendance: 15,000; Referee: Shamsul Maidin (Singapore)

6 September 2006 2007 Asian Cup Q	Saudi Arabia	7–1	India	Jeddah, Saudi Arabia
20:30 (UTC+3)	Bashir 30', 46'; Al Mahyani 33'; Ameen 57'; Al Hagbani 61'; Al Suwaileh 78', 86'	Report	Manju 22'	Stadium: Prince Abdullah Al-Faisal Stadium; Attendance: 3,000; Referee: Mohamed Omar Al Saeedi (United Arab Emirates)

11 October 2006 2007 Asian Cup Q	Saudi Arabia	5–0	Yemen	Jeddah, Saudi Arabia
22:15 (UTC+3)	Bashir 22'; Ameen 27'; Muath 65'; Al Mahyani 68', 90+2'	Report		Stadium: Prince Abdullah Al-Faisal Stadium; Attendance: 1,500; Referee: Ala Abdul Kadir Nema (Iraq)

8 November 2006 Friendly	Saudi Arabia	2–1	Jordan	Riyadh, Saudi Arabia
19:45 (UTC+3)	Al-Swaileh 74', 90'	Report	Al-Sheikh 31'	Stadium: Prince Faisal bin Fahd Stadium; Referee: Daffer Al-Shehri (Saudi Arabia)

15 November 2006 2007 Asian Cup Q	Japan	3–1	Saudi Arabia	Sapporo, Japan
19:00 (UTC+9)	Tulio 20'; Ganaha 29', 49'	Report	Al-Qahtani 33' (pen.)	Stadium: Sapporo Dome; Attendance: 40,965; Referee: Mark Shield (Australia)

== 2007 ==
8 January 2007 Friendly	Saudi Arabia	3–0	Gambia	Dammam, Saudi Arabia
19:30 (UTC+3)	Al-Montashari 20'; Y. Al-Qahtani 32', 50'	Report		Stadium: Prince Mohamed bin Fahd Stadium

11 January 2007 Friendly	Saudi Arabia	2–1	Syria	Dammam, Saudi Arabia
16:30 (UTC+3)	Al-Haqbani 79' (pen.); Bashir 88'	Report	Homsi 74'	Stadium: Prince Mohamed bin Fahd Stadium; Referee: Abdulrahman Al Tuwaijri (Saudi Arabia)

18 January 2007 18th AGC GS	Saudi Arabia	2–1	Bahrain	Abu Dhabi, United Arab Emirates
17:15 (UTC+4)	Y. Al-Qahtani 26' (pen.), 89'	Report	Yousef 13' (pen.)	Stadium: Al Nahyan Stadium; Referee: Massimo Busacca (Switzerland)

21 January 2007 18th AGC GS	Saudi Arabia	1–1	Qatar	Abu Dhabi, United Arab Emirates
19:30 (UTC+4)	Mouath 72'	Report	Nasser 10'	Stadium: Al Nahyan Stadium; Referee: Subkhiddin Mohd Salleh (Malaysia)

24 January 2007 18th AGC GS	Saudi Arabia	1–0	Iraq	Abu Dhabi, United Arab Emirates
17:15 (UTC+4)	Y. Al-Qahtani 12' (pen.)	Report		Stadium: Al Nahyan Stadium; Referee: Ali Al-Badwawi (United Arab Emirates)

27 January 2007 18th AGC SF	Saudi Arabia	0–1	United Arab Emirates	Abu Dhabi, United Arab Emirates
20:15 (UTC+4)		Report	Matar 90+1'	Stadium: Al Nahyan Stadium; Referee: Saad Al-Fadhli (Kuwait)

15 June 2007 Unofficial friendly	Kosovo (United Nations)	1–0	Saudi Arabia	Ankara, Turkey
	Nushi 80' (pen.)	Report

24 June 2007 Friendly	United Arab Emirates	0–2	Saudi Arabia	Kallang, Singapore
18:00 (UTC+8)		Report	Al-Harthi 49'; Mouath 59'	Stadium: National Stadium; Referee: Sritheran Kumar (Singapore)

27 June 2007 Friendly	Singapore	1–2	Saudi Arabia	Kallang, Singapore
20:30 (UTC+8)	Shariff 90+3'	Report	A. Al-Qahtani 30'; Al-Jassim 36'	Stadium: National Stadium; Referee: Jajat Hidayat (Indonesia)

1 July 2007 Friendly	Oman	1–1 (a.e.t.) (3–1 p)	Saudi Arabia	Jurong, Singapore
20:30 (UTC+8)	Bashir 60'	Report	Al-Shalhoub 54'	Stadium: Jurong Stadium
	Penalties
	Kano (penalty scored); Al-Ajmi (penalty missed); Bashir (penalty scored); Al-Mushaifri (penalty scored)		(penalty scored) Al-Shalhoub; (penalty missed) K. Al-Mousa; (penalty missed) Aziz; (penalty missed) Mouath

4 July 2007 Friendly	Saudi Arabia	1–1	North Korea	Jurong, Singapore
20:00 (UTC+8)	Mouath 62'	Report	Pak Nam-chol 83'	Stadium: Jurong Stadium

11 July 2007 2007 Asian Cup GS	South Korea	1–1	Saudi Arabia	Jakarta, Indonesia
19:35 (UTC+7)	Sung-Kuk 65'	Report	Y. Al-Qahtani 77' (pen.)	Stadium: Gelora Bung Karno Stadium; Attendance: 15,000; Referee: Mark Shield (Australia)

14 July 2007 2007 Asian Cup GS	Saudi Arabia	2–1	Indonesia	Jakarta, Indonesia
19:35 (UTC+7)	Y. Al-Qahtani 12'; Al-Harthi 89'	Report	Elie 17'	Stadium: Gelora Bung Karno Stadium; Attendance: 87,000; Referee: Ali Al Badwawi (United Arab Emirates)

18 July 2007 2007 Asian Cup GS	Saudi Arabia	4–0	Bahrain	Palembang, Indonesia
17:20 (UTC+7)	A. Al-Mousa 18'; A. Al-Qahtani 45'; Al-Jassim 68', 79'	Report		Stadium: Gelora Sriwijaya Stadium; Attendance: 500; Referee: Yuichi Nishimura (Japan)

22 July 2007 2007 Asian Cup QF	Saudi Arabia	2–1	Uzbekistan	Jakarta, Indonesia
20:15 (UTC+7)	Y. Al-Qahtani 3'; A. Al-Mousa 75'	Report	Solomin 82'	Stadium: Gelora Bung Karno Stadium; Attendance: 12,000; Referee: Kwon Jong-Chul (South Korea)

25 July 2007 2007 Asian Cup SF	Japan	2–3	Saudi Arabia	Hanoi, Vietnam
20:15 (UTC+7)	Nakazawa 37'; Abe 53'	Report	Y. Al-Qahtani 35'; Mouath 47', 57'	Stadium: Mỹ Đình Stadium; Attendance: 10,000; Referee: Matthew Breeze (Australia)

29 July 2007 2007 Asian Cup F	Iraq	1–0	Saudi Arabia	Jakarta, Indonesia
19:35 (UTC+7)	Mahmoud 73'	Report		Stadium: Gelora Bung Karno Stadium; Attendance: 60,000; Referee: Mark Shield (Australia)

11 September 2007 Friendly	Saudi Arabia	5–0	Ghana	Riyadh, Saudi Arabia
22:00 (UTC+3)	Y. Al-Qahtani 5', 51'; Kariri 25'; Al-Harthi 57' (pen.); Tukar 90+2' (pen.)	Report		Stadium: King Fahd International Stadium; Referee: Abdulrahman Al-Jarwan (Saudi Arabia)

2 November 2007 Friendly	Saudi Arabia	1–0	Namibia	Riyadh, Saudi Arabia
19:45 (UTC+3)	Al-Jassim 13'	Report		Stadium: King Fahd International Stadium; Referee: Jasim Karim (Bahrain)

9 November 2007 Friendly	Saudi Arabia	2–0	Estonia	Jeddah, Saudi Arabia
16:00 (UTC+3)	Al-Jassim 27'; Y. Al-Qahtani 38'	Report		Stadium: Prince Abdullah Al Faisal Stadium; Referee: Daffer Al-Shehri (Saudi Arabia)

18 November 2007 2007 Pan Arab Games	Saudi Arabia	1–2	Libya	Ismailia, Egypt
19:15 (UTC+2)	Kariri 9'	Report	El Fezzani 24'; Daoud 90+4'	Stadium: Ismailia Stadium; Referee: Basel Hajjar (Syria)

25 November 2007 2007 Pan Arab Games	Egypt	2–1	Saudi Arabia	Cairo, Egypt
21:00 (UTC+2)	Ghaly 39'; Motaeb 45'	Report	Al-Qahtani 55' (pen.)	Stadium: Cairo International Stadium; Referee: Basel Hajjar (Syria)

== 2008 ==
30 January 2008 Friendly	Saudi Arabia	2–1	Luxembourg	Riyadh, Saudi Arabia
20:00 (UTC+3)	Otaif 48' (pen.); Al-Qahtani 68'	Report	Peters 88' (pen.)	Stadium: King Fahd International Stadium; Attendance: 2,000; Referee: Mamdouh Al-Mirdasi (Saudi Arabia)

6 February 2008 2010 WCQ	Saudi Arabia	2–0	Singapore	Riyadh, Saudi Arabia
20:15 (UTC+3)	Al-Qahtani 38'; Mouath 81'	Report		Stadium: King Fahd International Stadium; Attendance: 10,000; Referee: Muhsen Basma (Syria)

26 March 2008 2010 WCQ	Uzbekistan	3–0	Saudi Arabia	Tashkent, Uzbekistan
16:00 (UTC+5)	Kapadze 45+1'; Shatskikh 65'; Djeparov 67' (pen.)	Report		Stadium: MHSK Stadium; Attendance: 17,000; Referee: Subkhiddin Mohd Salleh (Malaysia)

24 May 2008 Friendly	Saudi Arabia	1–0	Syria	Dammam, Saudi Arabia
20:45 (UTC+3)	Al-Muwallad 17'	Report		Stadium: Prince Mohamed bin Fahd Stadium; Referee: Naser Al Enezi (Kuwait)

27 May 2008 Friendly	Saudi Arabia	2–1	Kuwait	Dammam, Saudi Arabia
20:45 (UTC+3)	Mouath 50', 64'	Report	Ajab 55'	Stadium: Prince Mohamed bin Fahd Stadium; Referee: Khalifa Al-Dossari (Saudi Arabia)

2 June 2008 2010 WCQ	Saudi Arabia	4–1	Lebanon	Riyadh, Saudi Arabia
21:00 (UTC+3)	Al-Qahtani 45', 90+1'; Hawsawi 65'; Tukar 83'	Report	El Ali 43'	Stadium: King Fahd International Stadium; Attendance: 8,000; Referee: Saad Al Fadhli (Kuwait)

7 June 2008 2010 WCQ	Lebanon	1–2	Saudi Arabia	Riyadh, Saudi Arabia (Note: The Lebanon v Saudi Arabia match was moved from Beirut to Riyadh, Saudi Arabia.)
18:00 (UTC+3)	Ghaddar 90+3'	Report	Tukar 45+2', 60'	Stadium: King Fahd International Stadium; Attendance: 2,000; Referee: Satop Tongkhan (Thailand)

14 June 2008 2010 WCQ	Singapore	0–3; Awarded	Saudi Arabia	Singapore
19:30 (UTC+8)		Report	Otaif 37'; Al-Fraidi 76'	Stadium: National Stadium; Attendance: 23,000; Referee: Ben Williams (Australia)

22 June 2008 2010 WCQ	Saudi Arabia	4–0	Uzbekistan	Riyadh, Saudi Arabia
21:00 (UTC+3)	Otaif 5'; Mouath 36', 88'; Al-Harthi 56'	Report		Stadium: King Fahd International Stadium; Attendance: 5,000; Referee: Yuichi Nishimura (Japan)

20 August 2008 Friendly	Paraguay	1–1	Saudi Arabia	Nyon, Switzerland
16:00 (UTC+2)	Riveros 10'	Report	Al-Sultan 77'	Stadium: Colovray Sports Centre

30 August 2008 Friendly	Saudi Arabia	2–1	Qatar	Riyadh, Saudi Arabia
22:00 (UTC+3)	Otaif 43'; Al-Sultan 73'	Report	Majid 67'	Stadium: King Fahd International Stadium; Referee: Jasim Abdul Karim (Bahrain)

6 September 2008 2010 WCQ	Saudi Arabia	1–1	Iran	Riyadh, Saudi Arabia
22:15 (UTC+3)	Al-Harthi 29'	Report	Nekounam 81'	Stadium: King Fahd International Stadium; Attendance: 50,000; Referee: Mark Shield (Australia)

10 September 2008 2010 WCQ	United Arab Emirates	1–2	Saudi Arabia	Abu Dhabi, United Arab Emirates
22:15 (UTC+4)	Khater 23'	Report	Otaif 69'; Al-Fraidi 73'	Stadium: Mohammed bin Zayed Stadium; Attendance: 15,000; Referee: Yuichi Nishimura (Japan)

8 November 2008 Friendly	Saudi Arabia	1–0	Thailand	Riyadh, Saudi Arabia
19:30 (UTC+3)	Hazazi 65'	Report		Stadium: King Fahd International Stadium; Referee: Nawaf Shukralla (Bahrain)

12 November 2008 Friendly	Saudi Arabia	4–0	Bahrain	Riyadh, Saudi Arabia
19:45 (UTC+3)	Al-Sultan 25'; Hazazi 29', 57'; Tukar 90' (pen.)	Report		Stadium: King Fahd International Stadium; Referee: Mohammed Al Saeedi (United Arab Emirates)

19 November 2008 2010 WCQ	Saudi Arabia	0–2	South Korea	Riyadh, Saudi Arabia
19:35 (UTC+3)		Report	Lee Keun-Ho 76'; Park Chu-Young 90+2'	Stadium: King Fahd International Stadium; Attendance: 60,000; Referee: Abdul Malik Bashir (Singapore)

23 December 2008 Friendly	Bahrain	1–0	Saudi Arabia	Riffa, Bahrain
18:00 (UTC+3)	Salman 50'	Report		Stadium: Bahrain National Stadium

27 December 2008 Friendly	Saudi Arabia	1–1	Syria	Dammam, Saudi Arabia
17:30 (UTC+3)	Hawsawi 22'	Report	Rafe 50'	Stadium: Prince Mohamed bin Fahd Stadium

== 2009 ==
5 January 2009 19th AGC GS	Saudi Arabia	0–0	Qatar	Muscat, Oman
21:00 (UTC+4)		Report		Stadium: Royal Oman Police Stadium; Referee: Bertrand Layec (France)

8 January 2009 19th AGC GS	Saudi Arabia	6–0	Yemen	Muscat, Oman
21:00 (UTC+4)	Al-Qahtani 4'; Mouath 11', 83'; Shuhail 18'; Otaif 19'; Al-Mousa 36'	Report		Stadium: Royal Oman Police Stadium; Referee: Nawaf Shukralla (Bahrain)

11 January 2009 19th AGC GS	United Arab Emirates	0–3	Saudi Arabia	Muscat, Oman
18:00 (UTC+4)		Report	Al-Qahtani 58'; Al-Zori 70'; Al-Fraidi 72'	Stadium: Sultan Qaboos Sports Complex; Referee: Ravshan Irmatov (Uzbekistan)

14 January 2009 19th AGC SF	Kuwait	0–1	Saudi Arabia	Muscat, Oman
21:00 (UTC+4)		Report	Al-Fraidi 63'	Stadium: Sultan Qaboos Sports Complex; Referee: Bertrand Layec (France)

17 January 2009 19th AGC F	Oman	0–0 (a.e.t.) (6–5 p)	Saudi Arabia	Muscat, Oman
18:00 UTC+4		Report		Stadium: Sultan Qaboos Sports Complex; Referee: Eric Braamhaar (Netherlands)
	Penalties
	Ayil (penalty scored); Al-Ajmi (penalty scored); Mudhafar (penalty scored); Saleh (penalty scored); Bashir (penalty scored); Rabia (penalty scored)		(penalty scored) Al-Qahtani; (penalty scored) Khariri; (penalty scored) Tukar; (penalty scored) Otaif; (penalty scored) Hawsawi; (penalty missed) Al-Jassim

5 February 2009 Friendly	Saudi Arabia	2–1	Thailand	Sendai, Japan
15:00 (UTC+9)	Belal 61'; Al-Nemri 64'	Report	Dangda 89'	Stadium: Yurtec Stadium Sendai

11 February 2009 2010 WCQ	North Korea	1–0	Saudi Arabia	Pyongyang, North Korea
15:00 (UTC+9)	Mun In-Guk 28'	Report		Stadium: Kim Il-Sung Stadium; Attendance: 48,000; Referee: Ravshan Irmatov (Uzbekistan)

22 March 2009 Friendly	Saudi Arabia	0–0	Iraq	Riyadh, Saudi Arabia
20:30 (UTC+3)		Report		Stadium: King Fahd International Stadium; Referee: Nawaf Shukralla (Bahrain)

28 March 2009 2010 WCQ	Iran	1–2	Saudi Arabia	Tehran, Iran
19:00 (UTC+4:30)	Shojaei 57'	Report	Hazazi 79'; Al-Muwallad 87'	Stadium: Azadi Stadium; Attendance: 100,000; Referee: Yuichi Nishimura (Japan)

1 April 2009 2010 WCQ	Saudi Arabia	3–2	United Arab Emirates	Riyadh, Saudi Arabia
20:30 (UTC+3)	Otaif 4' (pen.); Juma 70' (o.g.); Hazazi 85'	Report	Al Shehhi 38'; Matar 45+1'	Stadium: King Fahd International Stadium; Attendance: 70,000; Referee: Subkhiddin Mohd Salleh (Malaysia)

26 May 2009 Friendly	Qatar	2–1	Saudi Arabia	Doha, Qatar
19:00 (UTC+3)	Afif 64' (pen.); Mohamed 87'	Report	Al-Jassim 45'	Stadium: Jassim bin Hamad Stadium

4 June 2009 Friendly	China	1–4	Saudi Arabia	Tianjin, China
18:00 (UTC+8)	Ning 33'	Report	Al-Qahtani 5'; Noor 44'; Hazazi 72'; Al-Saran 88' (pen.)	Stadium: TEDA Football Stadium; Attendance: 26,000; Referee: Daxue Wan (China)

10 June 2009 2010 WCQ	South Korea	0–0	Saudi Arabia	Seoul, South Korea
20:00 (UTC+9)		Report		Stadium: Seoul World Cup Stadium; Attendance: 32,510; Referee: Ben Williams (Australia)

17 June 2009 2010 WCQ	Saudi Arabia	0–0	North Korea	Riyadh, Saudi Arabia
21:00 (UTC+3)		Report		Stadium: King Fahd International Stadium; Attendance: 65,000; Referee: Muhsen Basma (Syria)

12 August 2009 Friendly	Oman	2–1	Saudi Arabia	Salalah, Oman
16:00 (UTC+4)	Rabia 47', 63'	Report	Al-Shamrani 90+4' (pen.)	Stadium: Al-Saada Stadium; Referee: Naser Al Enezi (Kuwait)

30 August 2009 Friendly	Saudi Arabia	2–1	Malaysia	Dammam, Saudi Arabia
22:00 (UTC+3)	Mouath 37'; Al-Ghanam 53'	Report	Adan 85'	Stadium: Prince Mohamed bin Fahd Stadium; Referee: Naser Al Enezi (Kuwait)

5 September 2009 2010 WCQ	Bahrain	0–0	Saudi Arabia	Riffa, Bahrain
22:00 (UTC+3)		Report		Stadium: Bahrain National Stadium; Attendance: 16,000; Referee: Yuichi Nishimura (Japan)

9 September 2009 2010 WCQ	Saudi Arabia	2–2	Bahrain	Riyadh, Saudi Arabia
22:15 (UTC+3)	Al-Shamrani 13'; Al-Montashari 90+1'	Report	Jaycee John 42'; Abdullatif 90+3'	Stadium: King Fahd International Stadium; Attendance: 50,000; Referee: Ravshan Irmatov (Uzbekistan)

14 October 2009 Friendly	Tunisia	0–1	Saudi Arabia	Radès, Tunisia
20:10 (UTC+2)		Report	Al-Shamrani 2'	Stadium: Stade Olympique de Radès; Referee: Mokhtar Amalou (Algeria)

14 November 2009 Friendly	Saudi Arabia	1–1	Belarus	Khobar, Saudi Arabia
17:30 (UTC+3)	Al-Shamrani 31'	Report	Bardachow 20'	Stadium: Prince Saud bin Jalawi Stadium; Attendance: 1,100; Referee: Salah Abbas Alabbasi (Bahrain)

== Statistics ==
=== Results by year ===
Year	Pld	W	D	L	GF	GA	GD
2000	16	8	4	4	28	16	+12
2001	24	17	3	4	62	16	+46
2002	22	13	3	6	30	27	+3
2003	12	8	3	1	36	4	+32
2004	18	10	4	4	29	16	+13
2005	22	12	4	6	35	20	+15
2006	24	9	6	9	37	30	+7
2007	22	13	4	5	37	18	+19
2008	18	12	3	3	32	15	+17
2009	20	9	8	3	29	14	+15
Total	198	111	42	45	355	176	+179

As of 2009

=== Opponents ===
Team	Pld	W	D	L	GF	GA	GD
Azerbaijan	1	1	0	0	1	0	+1
Bahrain	14	8	4	2	25	11	+14
Bangladesh	2	2	0	0	9	0	+9
Belarus	1	0	1	0	1	1	0
Belgium	1	0	0	1	1	2	−1
Bhutan	2	2	0	0	10	0	+10
Brazil	1	0	0	1	0	1	−1
Cameroon	1	0	0	1	0	1	−1
China	2	2	0	0	6	1	+5
Czech Republic	1	0	0	1	0	2	−2
Denmark	1	0	0	1	0	1	−1
Egypt	2	0	0	2	1	3	−2
Estonia	3	1	1	1	3	3	0
Finland	2	0	1	1	2	5	−3
Gambia	1	1	0	0	3	0	+3
Germany	1	0	0	1	0	8	−8
Ghana	2	1	0	1	6	3	+3
Greece	1	0	1	0	1	1	0
Hungary	2	0	2	0	2	2	0
Iceland	1	1	0	0	1	0	+1
India	2	2	0	0	10	1	+9
Indonesia	5	5	0	0	19	2	+17
Iran	5	1	2	2	6	8	−2
Iraq	9	3	2	4	8	13	−5
Japan	5	2	0	3	6	10	−4
Jordan	1	0	0	1	0	1	−1
Kazakhstan	1	1	0	0	1	0	+1
Kuwait	9	4	4	1	13	8	+5
Lebanon	6	3	2	1	9	5	+4
Libya	1	0	0	1	1	2	−1
Liechtenstein	1	0	0	1	0	1	−1
Luxembourg	1	1	0	0	2	1	+1
Macedonia	1	0	1	0	1	1	0
Malaysia	2	2	0	0	6	1	+5
Mongolia	2	2	0	0	12	0	+12
Morocco	1	1	0	0	1	0	+1
Namibia	1	1	0	0	1	0	+1
North Korea	4	1	2	1	2	2	0
Oman	6	3	2	1	8	5	+3
Palestine	2	2	0	0	5	0	+5
Paraguay	1	0	1	0	1	1	0
Poland	1	0	0	1	1	2	−1
Portugal	1	0	0	1	0	3	−3
Qatar	8	2	4	2	8	7	+1
Republic of Ireland	1	0	0	1	0	3	−3
Romania	1	1	0	0	2	0	+2
Senegal	1	1	0	0	3	2	+1
Singapore	4	4	0	0	10	1	+9
Slovakia	1	0	1	0	1	1	0
Slovenia	1	0	0	1	0	2	−2
South Africa	1	1	0	0	1	0	+1
South Korea	6	3	2	1	6	4	+2
Spain	1	0	0	1	0	1	−1
Sri Lanka	2	2	0	0	4	0	+4
Sweden	1	0	1	0	1	1	0
Syria	11	7	4	0	21	7	+14
Tajikistan	1	1	0	0	3	0	+3
Thailand	4	4	0	0	10	3	+7
Togo	1	1	0	0	1	0	+1
Tunisia	2	1	1	0	3	2	+1
Turkey	1	0	0	1	0	1	−1
Turkmenistan	4	3	1	0	7	2	+5
Uganda	1	1	0	0	3	1	+2
Ukraine	1	0	0	1	0	4	−4
United Arab Emirates	10	8	0	2	20	7	+13
Uruguay	1	1	0	0	3	2	+1
Uzbekistan	7	4	1	2	15	6	+9
Vietnam	2	2	0	0	9	0	+9
Yemen	9	8	1	0	35	3	+32
Zimbabwe	1	0	0	1	0	2	−2
Total	194	108	42	44	351	174	+177
