= 2006 FIFA World Cup Group H =

Football tournament group stage

Play in Group H of the 2006 FIFA World Cup began on 14 June and completed on 23 June 2006. Spain won the group and advanced to the round of 16, along with Ukraine. Tunisia and Saudi Arabia failed to advance.

== Standings ==
Pos	Team	Pld	W	D	L	GF	GA	GD	Pts	Qualification
1	Spain	3	3	0	0	8	1	+7	9	Advance to knockout stage
2	Ukraine	3	2	0	1	5	4	+1	6	Advance to knockout stage
3	Tunisia	3	0	1	2	3	6	−3	1	
4	Saudi Arabia	3	0	1	2	2	7	−5	1	

Source: FIFA
Rules for classification: Tie-breaking criteria
- Spain advanced to play France (runners-up of Group G) in the round of 16.
- Ukraine advanced to play Switzerland (winners of Group G) in the round of 16.

== Matches ==
All times local (CEST/UTC+2)

=== Spain vs Ukraine ===
14 June 2006
15:00

Spain	4–0	Ukraine
Alonso 13'; Villa 17', 48' (pen.); Torres 81'

Zentralstadion, Leipzig
Attendance: 43,000
Referee: Massimo Busacca (Switzerland)

Spain	Ukraine

GK	1	Iker Casillas (c)
RB	15	Sergio Ramos
CB	22	Pablo Ibáñez
CB	5	Carles Puyol
LB	3	Mariano Pernía
RM	16	Marcos Senna
CM	14	Xabi Alonso	(substituted off) 55'
LM	8	Xavi
AM	11	Luis García	(substituted off) 77'
CF	21	David Villa	(substituted off) 55'
CF	9	Fernando Torres
Substitutions:
MF	6	David Albelda	(substituted on) 55'
FW	7	Raúl	(substituted on) 55'
MF	18	Cesc Fàbregas	(substituted on) 77'
Manager:
Luis Aragonés

GK	1	Oleksandr Shovkovskyi
RB	5	Volodymyr Yezerskiy	(yellow card) 52'
CB	17	Vladyslav Vashchuk	(red card) 47'
CB	6	Andriy Rusol	(yellow card) 17'
LB	2	Andriy Nesmachnyi
RM	9	Oleh Husyev		(substituted off) 46'
CM	4	Anatoliy Tymoshchuk
CM	14	Andriy Husin		(substituted off) 46'
LM	21	Ruslan Rotan		(substituted off) 63'
SS	10	Andriy Voronin
CF	7	Andriy Shevchenko (c)
Substitutions:
MF	8	Oleh Shelayev		(substituted on) 46'
FW	16	Andriy Vorobey		(substituted on) 46'
FW	11	Serhii Rebrov		(substituted on) 63'
Manager:
Oleg Blokhin

Man of the Match:
Xavi (Spain)

Assistant referees:
Francesco Buragina (Switzerland)
Matthias Arnet (Switzerland)
Fourth official:
Roberto Rosetti (Italy)
Fifth official:
Cristiano Copelli (Italy)

=== Tunisia vs Saudi Arabia ===
14 June 2006
18:00

Tunisia	2–2	Saudi Arabia
Jaziri 23'; Jaïdi 90+2'		Al-Qahtani 57'; Al-Jaber 84'

Allianz Arena, Munich
Attendance: 66,000
Referee: Mark Shield (Australia)

Tunisia	Saudi Arabia

GK	1	Ali Boumnijel
RB	6	Hatem Trabelsi
CB	15	Radhi Jaïdi
CB	3	Karim Haggui	(yellow card) 35'
LB	18	David Jemmali
RM	13	Riadh Bouazizi (c)	(yellow card) 36'	(substituted off) 55'
CM	12	Jawhar Mnari
LM	14	Adel Chedli	(yellow card) 65'	(substituted off) 69'
AM	20	Hamed Namouchi
CF	5	Ziad Jaziri
CF	9	Yassine Chikhaoui	(yellow card) 79'	(substituted off) 82'
Substitutions:
MF	8	Mehdi Nafti		(substituted on) 55'
MF	10	Kaies Ghodhbane		(substituted on) 69'
DF	2	Karim Essediri		(substituted on) 82'
Manager:
(France) Roger Lemerre

GK	21	Mabrouk Zaid
RB	2	Ahmed Al-Dokhi
CB	3	Redha Tukar
CB	4	Hamad Al-Montashari
LB	13	Hussein Sulaimani (c)
RM	6	Omar Al-Ghamdi
CM	16	Khaled Aziz
LM	14	Saud Kariri
AM	8	Mohammed Noor	(substituted off) 74'
AM	18	Nawaf Al-Temyat	(substituted off) 67'
CF	20	Yasser Al-Qahtani	(substituted off) 82'
Substitutions:
FW	23	Malek Mouath	(substituted on) 67'
MF	7	Mohammed Ameen	(substituted on) 74'
FW	9	Sami Al-Jaber	(substituted on) 82'
Manager:
(Brazil) Marcos Paquetá

Man of the Match:
Ziad Jaziri (Tunisia)

Assistant referees:
Nathan Gibson (Australia)
Ben Wilson (Australia)
Fourth official:
Carlos Chandía (Chile)
Fifth official:
Christian Julio (Chile)

=== Saudi Arabia vs Ukraine ===
19 June 2006
18:00

Saudi Arabia	0–4	Ukraine
		Rusol 4'; Rebrov 36'; Shevchenko 46'; Kalynychenko 84'

Volksparkstadion, Hamburg
Attendance: 50,000
Referee: Graham Poll (England)

Saudi Arabia	Ukraine

GK	21	Mabrouk Zaid
RB	2	Ahmed Al-Dokhi	(yellow card) 41'	(substituted off) 55'
CB	3	Redha Tukar
CB	4	Hamad Al-Montashari
LB	13	Hussein Sulaimani (c)
RM	6	Omar Al-Ghamdi	(yellow card) 57'
CM	7	Mohammed Ameen		(substituted off) 55'
CM	16	Khaled Aziz
CM	8	Mohammed Noor		(substituted off) 77'
LM	14	Saud Kariri	(yellow card) 73'
CF	20	Yasser Al-Qahtani
Substitutions:
FW	23	Malek Mouath		(substituted on) 55'
DF	12	Abdulaziz Khathran		(substituted on) 55'
FW	9	Sami Al-Jaber		(substituted on) 77'
Manager:
(Brazil) Marcos Paquetá

GK	1	Oleksandr Shovkovskyi
CB	22	Vyacheslav Sviderskyi	(yellow card) 89'
CB	6	Andriy Rusol
CB	2	Andriy Nesmachnyi	(yellow card) 22'
RM	9	Oleh Husyev
CM	11	Serhii Rebrov		(substituted off) 71'
CM	4	Anatoliy Tymoshchuk
CM	8	Oleh Shelayev
LM	19	Maksym Kalynychenko	(yellow card) 77'
SS	10	Andriy Voronin		(substituted off) 79'
CF	7	Andriy Shevchenko (c)		(substituted off) 86'
Substitutions:
MF	21	Ruslan Rotan		(substituted on) 71'
MF	14	Andriy Husin		(substituted on) 79'
FW	15	Artem Milevskyi		(substituted on) 86'
Manager:
Oleg Blokhin

Man of the Match:
Maksym Kalynychenko (Ukraine)

Assistant referees:
Philip Sharp (England)
Glenn Turner (England)
Fourth official:
Toru Kamikawa (Japan)
Fifth official:
Yoshikazu Hiroshima (Japan)

=== Spain vs Tunisia ===
19 June 2006
21:00

Spain	3–1	Tunisia
Raúl 71'; Torres 76', 90+1' (pen.)		Mnari 8'

Gottlieb-Daimler-Stadion, Stuttgart
Attendance: 52,000
Referee: Carlos Simon (Brazil)

Spain	Tunisia

GK	1	Iker Casillas (c)
RB	15	Sergio Ramos
CB	22	Pablo Ibáñez
CB	5	Carles Puyol	(yellow card) 30'
LB	3	Mariano Pernía
RM	16	Marcos Senna		(substituted off) 46'
CM	14	Xabi Alonso
LM	8	Xavi
AM	11	Luis García		(substituted off) 46'
RF	21	David Villa		(substituted off) 57'
LF	9	Fernando Torres
Substitutions:
FW	7	Raúl		(substituted on) 46'
MF	18	Cesc Fàbregas	(yellow card) 89'	(substituted on) 46'
MF	17	Joaquín		(substituted on) 57'
Manager:
Luis Aragonés

GK	1	Ali Boumnijel
RB	6	Hatem Trabelsi	(yellow card) 40'
CB	15	Radhi Jaïdi	(yellow card) 70'
CB	3	Karim Haggui
LB	19	Anis Ayari	(yellow card) 32'	(substituted off) 57'
RM	13	Riadh Bouazizi (c)		(substituted off) 57'
CM	20	Hamed Namouchi
CM	8	Mehdi Nafti
CM	12	Jawhar Mnari	(yellow card) 90+3'
LM	14	Adel Chedli		(substituted off) 80'
CF	5	Ziad Jaziri	(yellow card) 85'
Substitutions:
DF	4	Alaeddine Yahia		(substituted on) 57'
MF	10	Kaies Ghodhbane		(substituted on) 57'
FW	7	Haykel Guemamdia	(yellow card) 81'	(substituted on) 80'
Manager:
(France) Roger Lemerre

Man of the Match:
Xabi Alonso (Spain)

Assistant referees:
Aristeu Tavares (Brazil)
Edmílson Corona (Brazil)
Fourth official:
Carlos Chandía (Chile)
Fifth official:
Christian Julio (Chile)

=== Saudi Arabia vs Spain ===
23 June 2006
16:00

Saudi Arabia	0–1	Spain
		Juanito 36'

Fritz-Walter-Stadion, Kaiserslautern
Attendance: 46,000
Referee: Coffi Codjia (Benin)

Saudi Arabia	Spain

GK	21	Mabrouk Zaid
RB	2	Ahmed Al-Dokhi
CB	3	Redha Tukar
CB	4	Hamad Al-Montashari
LB	12	Abdulaziz Khathran
RM	8	Mohammed Noor
CM	14	Saud Kariri
CM	16	Khaled Aziz		(substituted off) 13'
LM	13	Hussein Sulaimani		(substituted off) 81'
CF	11	Saad Al-Harthi
CF	9	Sami Al-Jaber (c)	(yellow card) 27'	(substituted off) 68'
Substitutions:
MF	18	Nawaf Al-Temyat	(yellow card) 77'	(substituted on) 13'
FW	23	Malek Mouath		(substituted on) 68'
DF	19	Mohammad Massad		(substituted on) 81'
Manager:
(Brazil) Marcos Paquetá

GK	19	Santiago Cañizares
RB	2	Míchel Salgado
CB	20	Juanito
CB	4	Carlos Marchena	(yellow card) 75'
LB	12	Antonio López
CM	18	Cesc Fàbregas		(substituted off) 66'
CM	6	David Albelda	(yellow card) 30'
CM	13	Andrés Iniesta
RF	17	Joaquín
CF	7	Raúl (c)		(substituted off) 46'
LF	10	José Antonio Reyes	(yellow card) 35'	(substituted off) 70'
Substitutions:
FW	21	David Villa		(substituted on) 46'
MF	8	Xavi		(substituted on) 66'
FW	9	Fernando Torres		(substituted on) 70'
Manager:
Luis Aragonés

Man of the Match:
Juanito (Spain)

Assistant referees:
Celestin Ntagungira (Rwanda)
Aboudou Aderodjou (Benin)
Fourth official:
Mohamed Guezzaz (Morocco)
Fifth official:
Brahim Djezzar (Algeria)

=== Ukraine vs Tunisia ===
23 June 2006
16:00

Ukraine	1–0	Tunisia
Shevchenko 70' (pen.)

Olympiastadion, Berlin
Attendance: 72,000
Referee: Carlos Amarilla (Paraguay)

Ukraine	Tunisia

GK	1	Oleksandr Shovkovskyi
CB	22	Vyacheslav Sviderskyi	(yellow card) 18'
CB	6	Andriy Rusol	(yellow card) 65'
CB	2	Andriy Nesmachnyi
RM	9	Oleh Husyev
CM	11	Serhii Rebrov		(substituted off) 55'
CM	4	Anatoliy Tymoshchuk	(yellow card) 61'
CM	8	Oleh Shelayev	(yellow card) 47'
LM	19	Maksym Kalynychenko		(substituted off) 75'
SS	10	Andriy Voronin
CF	7	Andriy Shevchenko (c)		(substituted off) 88'
Substitutions:
FW	16	Andriy Vorobey		(substituted on) 55'
MF	14	Andriy Husin		(substituted on) 75'
FW	15	Artem Milevskyi		(substituted on) 88'
Manager:
Oleg Blokhin

GK	1	Ali Boumnijel
RB	6	Hatem Trabelsi
CB	15	Radhi Jaïdi	(yellow card) 90'
CB	3	Karim Haggui
LB	19	Anis Ayari
RM	13	Riadh Bouazizi (c)	(yellow card) 43'	(substituted off) 79'
CM	8	Mehdi Nafti		(substituted off) 90+1'
CM	20	Hamed Namouchi
CM	12	Jawhar Mnari
LM	14	Adel Chedli		(substituted off) 79'
CF	5	Ziad Jaziri	(yellow card) 9' (yellow-red card) 45+1'
Substitutions:
FW	11	Francileudo Santos		(substituted on) 79'
FW	17	Chaouki Ben Saada		(substituted on) 79'
MF	10	Kaies Ghodhbane		(substituted on) 90+1'
Manager:
(France) Roger Lemerre

Man of the Match:
Anatoliy Tymoshchuk (Ukraine)

Assistant referees:
Amelio Andino (Paraguay)
Manuel Bernal (Paraguay)
Fourth official:
Marco Rodríguez (Mexico)
Fifth official:
Hamdi Al Kadri (Syria)

== See also ==
- Saudi Arabia at the FIFA World Cup
- Spain at the FIFA World Cup
- Tunisia at the FIFA World Cup
- Ukraine at the FIFA World Cup
