= 2008 Australia national soccer team season =

Australia
2008 season
- Chairmen: Frank Lowy
- Manager: Pim Verbeek
Home colours	Away colours

This page summarises the Australia national soccer team fixtures and results in 2008.

== Summary ==
The main focus for the National Team was to attempt to qualify for their third World Cup. The 2010 campaign was Australia's first as a member of the AFC and they entered the qualification in the Third Round drawn into a group containing Qatar, Iraq and China. Matches took place from February until June and Australia had already succeeded in moving through the next round when they lost to China at home in the final game. Despite this, they still topped the group.

Fourth Round qualifying had Australia in a group with Bahrain, Japan, Qatar and Uzbekistan. By the end of the calendar year, they had played three games for three wins and were sitting top of the group with five games yet to be played.

They also enjoyed a come from behind friendly win away to the Netherlands who were ranked four in the world at the time. Australia finished the year ranked 28 on the FIFA Rankings.

== Record ==
Type	GP	W	D	L	GF	GA
Friendly matches	4	2	2	0	5	3
World Cup qualifiers	9	6	1	2	13	3
Total	13	8	3	2	18	6

== Match results ==
=== Friendlies ===
22 March Friendly	Singapore	0–0	Australia	Kallang, Singapore
		(Report)		Stadium: National Stadium; Attendance: 6,282; Referee: Prayoon Veerapool (Thailand)

23 May Friendly	Australia	1–0	Ghana	Sydney, Australia
	Sterjovski 46'	(Report)		Stadium: Sydney Football Stadium; Attendance: 29,914; Referee: Hajime Matsuo (Japan)

19 August Friendly	Australia	2–2	South Africa	London, England
	Sterjovski 25'; Kennedy 38'	(Report)	21' Nkosi; 58' Modise	Stadium: Loftus Road; Attendance: 10,000; Referee: Howard Webb (England)

6 September Friendly	Netherlands	1–2	Australia	Eindhoven, Netherlands
	Huntelaar 6'	(Report)	45+1' (pen.) Kewell; 76' Kennedy	Stadium: Philips Stadion; Attendance: 22,500; Referee: Martin Atkinson (England)

=== World Cup qualifiers ===
6 February Third Round	Australia	3–0	Qatar	Melbourne, Australia
	Kennedy 11'; Cahill 17'; Bresciano 33'	[ (Report)]		Stadium: Telstra Dome; Attendance: 50,969; Referee: Subkhiddin Mohd Salleh (Malaysia)

26 March Third Round	China	0–0	Australia	Kunming, China
		[ (Report)]		Stadium: Kunming Stadium; Referee: Mohamed Al Saeedi (United Arab Emirates)

1 June Third Round	Australia	1–0	Iraq	Brisbane, Australia
	Kewell 47'	[ (Report)]		Stadium: Suncorp Stadium; Attendance: 48,678; Referee: Ravshan Irmatov (Uzbekistan)

7 June Third Round	Iraq	1–0	Australia	Dubai, United Arab Emirates
	Mohammed 28'	[ (Report)]		Stadium: Al-Rashid Stadium; Attendance: 8,000; Referee: Kazuhiko Matsumura (Japan)

14 June Third Round	Qatar	1–3	Australia	Doha, Qatar
	Ibrahim 89'	[ (Report)]	17', 56' Emerton; 74' Kewell	Stadium: Jassim Bin Hamad Stadium; Attendance: 12,000; Referee: Lee Gi-Young (South Korea)

22 June Third Round	Australia	0–1	China	Sydney, Australia
		[ (Report)]	12' Sun	Stadium: Stadium Australia; Attendance: 70,054; Referee: Khalil Al Ghamdi (Saudi Arabia)

10 September Fourth Round	Uzbekistan	0–1	Australia	Tashkent, Uzbekistan
		[ (Report)]	26' Chipperfield	Stadium: Pakhtakor Stadium; Attendance: 34,000; Referee: Saad Kamil Al-Fadhli (Kuwait)

15 October Fourth Round	Australia	4–0	Qatar	Brisbane, Australia
	Cahill 8'; Emerton 17', 58'; Kennedy 76'	[ (Report)]		Stadium: Suncorp Stadium; Attendance: 34,320; Referee: Khalil Al Ghamdi (Saudi Arabia)

19 November Fourth Round	Bahrain	0–1	Australia	Manama, Bahrain
		[ (Report)]	90+3' Bresciano	Stadium: National Stadium; Attendance: 10,000; Referee: Masoud Moradi (Iran)

== Goal scorers ==
Player	Friendlies	FIFA World Cup qual.	Goals
Emerton	-	4	4
Kennedy	2	2	4
Kewell	1	2	3
Bresciano	-	2	2
Cahill	-	2	2
Sterjovski	2	-	2
Chipperfield	-	1	1
