= 2010 FIFA World Cup qualification – AFC third round =

International football competition

The AFC third round of 2010 FIFA World Cup qualification was decided by a random draw which was conducted in Durban, South Africa on 25 November 2007. The round began on 6 February 2008 and finished on 22 June 2008.

The top two countries in each group at the end of the stage progressed to the fourth round, where the ten remaining teams will be divided into two groups of five.

== Format ==
The 20 teams (five teams given a bye directly to the third round, 11 highest-ranked winners from the first round, and four winners from the second round) were divided into four pots for the draw, each containing five teams. The pots were drawn as follows:

Pot A	Pot B	Pot C	Pot D
Australia; South Korea; Iran; Japan; Saudi Arabia	Bahrain; Uzbekistan; Kuwait; North Korea; China	Jordan; Iraq; Lebanon; Oman; United Arab Emirates	Qatar; Syria; Thailand; Turkmenistan; Singapore

The 20 teams were split into five groups of four teams each, with all teams playing home and away against each of the other three teams in the group.

The top two teams in each group qualified for the fourth round.

== Group 1 ==
Pos	Team	Pld	W	D	L	GF	GA	GD	Pts	Qualification	(Australia)	(Qatar)	(Iraq)	(China)
1	Australia	6	3	1	2	7	3	+4	10	Fourth round	—	3–0	1–0	0–1
2	Qatar	6	3	1	2	5	6	−1	10	Fourth round	1–3	—	2–0	0–0
3	Iraq	6	2	1	3	4	6	−2	7		1–0	0–1	—	1–1
4	China	6	1	3	2	3	4	−1	6		0–0	0–1	1–2	—

6 February 2008
19:30 UTC+11

Australia	3–0	Qatar
Kennedy 11'; Cahill 17'; Bresciano 33'	Report

Telstra Dome, Melbourne
Attendance: 50,969
Referee: Subkhiddin Mohd Salleh (Malaysia)
6 February 2008
16:30 UTC+4

Iraq	1–1	China
H.M. Mohammed 51' (pen.)	Report	Zheng Zhi 75'

Al-Rashid Stadium, Dubai (United Arab Emirates) (Note: Due to security concerns, Iraq's home matches were played in Dubai, United Arab Emirates.)
Attendance: 11,000
Referee: Mohsen Torky (Iran)

26 March 2008
14:00 UTC+8

China	0–0	Australia
	Report

Tuodong Stadium, Kunming
Attendance: 32,000
Referee: Mohamed Al Saeedi (United Arab Emirates)
26 March 2008
18:30 UTC+3

Qatar	2–0	Iraq
Fábio César 1', 62'	Report

Jassim Bin Hamad Stadium, Doha
Attendance: 13,000
Referee: Yuichi Nishimura (Japan)

1 June 2008
17:00 UTC+10

Australia	1–0	Iraq
Kewell 47'	Report

Suncorp Stadium, Brisbane
Attendance: 48,678
Referee: Ravshan Irmatov (Uzbekistan)
2 June 2008
19:00 UTC+3

Qatar	0–0	China
	Report

Jassim Bin Hamad Stadium, Doha
Attendance: 9,000
Referee: Muhsen Basma (Syria)

7 June 2008
20:00 UTC+8

China	0–1	Qatar
	Report	Soria 14' (pen.)

Tianjin Olympic Centre Stadium, Tianjin
Attendance: 50,000
Referee: Talaat Najm (Lebanon)
7 June 2008
20:00 UTC+4

Iraq	1–0	Australia
E. Mohammed 28'	Report

Al-Rashid Stadium, Dubai (United Arab Emirates)
Attendance: 8,000
Referee: Kazuhiko Matsumura (Japan)

14 June 2008
20:00 UTC+8

China	1–2	Iraq
Zhou Haibin 33'	Report	E. Mohammed 41'; Akram 67'

Tianjin Olympic Centre Stadium, Tianjin
Attendance: 39,000
Referee: Abdul Bashir (Singapore)
14 June 2008
19:00 UTC+3

Qatar	1–3	Australia
Al Khalfan 89'	Report	Emerton 17', 56'; Kewell 74'

Jassim Bin Hamad Stadium, Doha
Attendance: 12,000
Referee: Lee Gi-Young (South Korea)

22 June 2008
18:00 UTC+10

Australia	0–1	China
	Report	Sun Xiang 12'

Stadium Australia, Sydney
Attendance: 70,054
Referee: Khalil Al Ghamdi (Saudi Arabia)
22 June 2008
20:00 UTC+4

Iraq	0–1	Qatar
	Report	Bechir 77'

Al-Rashid Stadium, Dubai (United Arab Emirates)
Attendance: 10,000
Referee: Ali Hamad Al-Badwawi (UAE)

== Group 2 ==
Pos	Team	Pld	W	D	L	GF	GA	GD	Pts	Qualification	(Japan)	(Bahrain)	(Oman)	(Thailand)
1	Japan	6	4	1	1	12	3	+9	13	Fourth round	—	1–0	3–0	4–1
2	Bahrain	6	3	2	1	7	5	+2	11	Fourth round	1–0	—	1–1	1–1
3	Oman	6	2	2	2	5	7	−2	8		1–1	0–1	—	2–1
4	Thailand	6	0	1	5	5	14	−9	1		0–3	2–3	0–1	—

6 February 2008
19:20 UTC+9

Japan	4–1	Thailand
Endō 21'; Ōkubo 54'; Nakazawa 66'; Maki 90+1'	Report	Winothai 22'

Saitama Stadium, Saitama
Attendance: 35,130
Referee: Khalil Al Ghamdi (Saudi Arabia)
6 February 2008
18:30 UTC+4

Oman	0–1	Bahrain
	Report	Hubail 14'

Sultan Qaboos Sports Complex, Muscat
Attendance: 28,000
Referee: Lee Gi-Young (South Korea)

26 March 2008
18:30 UTC+7

Thailand	0–1	Oman
	Report	Sulaiman 1'

Rajamangala National Stadium, Bangkok
Attendance: 40,000
Referee: Mohsen Torky (Iran)
26 March 2008
17:20 UTC+3

Bahrain	1–0	Japan
Hubail 77'	Report

Bahrain National Stadium, Riffa
Attendance: 26,000
Referee: Mark Shield (Australia)

2 June 2008
19:20 UTC+9

Japan	3–0	Oman
Nakazawa 10'; Ōkubo 22'; S. Nakamura 49'	Report

International Stadium Yokohama, Yokohama
Attendance: 46,764
Referee: Abdul Malik Bashir (Singapore)
2 June 2008
18:30 UTC+7

Thailand	2–3	Bahrain
Chaikamdee 25'; Winothai 45'	Report	Isa 22'; Latif 34'; Adnan 57'

Rajamangala National Stadium, Bangkok
Attendance: 15,000
Referee: Sun Baojie (China PR)

7 June 2008
17:15 UTC+4

Oman	1–1	Japan
Ahmed Mubarak 11'	Report	Endō 53' (pen.)

Royal Oman Police Stadium, Muscat
Attendance: 6,500
Referee: Subkhiddin Mohd Salleh (Malaysia)
7 June 2008
19:30 UTC+3

Bahrain	1–1	Thailand
Isa 67'	Report	Thonglao 65'

Bahrain National Stadium, Riffa
Attendance: 21,000
Referee: Muhsen Basma (Syria)

14 June 2008
17:30 UTC+7

Thailand	0–3	Japan
	Report	Tulio 23'; Nakazawa 39'; K. Nakamura 89'

Rajamangala National Stadium, Bangkok
Attendance: 25,000
Referee: Ali Hamad Al-Badwawi (UAE)
14 June 2008
19:30 UTC+3

Bahrain	1–1	Oman
Aaish 41'	Report	Sulaiman 72'

Bahrain National Stadium, Riffa
Attendance: 25,000
Referee: Saad Al Fadhli (Kuwait)

22 June 2008
19:20 UTC+9

Japan	1–0	Bahrain
Uchida 90'	Report

Saitama Stadium, Saitama
Attendance: 51,180
Referee: Ravshan Irmatov (Uzbekistan)
22 June 2008
18:00 UTC+4

Oman	2–1	Thailand
Al Hosni 58', 85'	Report	Sripan 3' (pen.)

Royal Oman Police Stadium, Muscat
Attendance: 3,000
Referee: Salem Mujghef (Jordan)

== Group 3 ==
Pos	Team	Pld	W	D	L	GF	GA	GD	Pts	Qualification	(South Korea)	(North Korea)	(Jordan)	(Turkmenistan)
1	South Korea	6	3	3	0	10	3	+7	12	Fourth round	—	0–0	2–2	4–0
2	North Korea	6	3	3	0	4	0	+4	12	Fourth round	0–0	—	2–0	1–0
3	Jordan	6	2	1	3	6	6	0	7		0–1	0–1	—	2–0
4	Turkmenistan	6	0	1	5	1	12	−11	1		1–3	0–0	0–2	—

6 February 2008
20:00 UTC+9

South Korea	4–0	Turkmenistan
Kwak Tae-hwi 43'; Seol Ki-hyeon 57', 85'; Park Ji-sung 73'	Report

Seoul World Cup Stadium, Seoul
Attendance: 25,738
Referee: Jasim Karim (Bahrain)
6 February 2008
17:00 UTC+2

Jordan	0–1	North Korea
	Report	Hong Yong-jo 44'

Amman International Stadium, Amman
Attendance: 16,000
Referee: Tayeb Shamsuzzaman (Bangladesh)

26 March 2008
19:00 UTC+8

North Korea	0–0	South Korea
	Report

Hongkou Football Stadium, Shanghai (China) (Note: Since North Korea refused to play the anthem and fly the flag of South Korea, the match was moved from Pyongyang to Shanghai, China.)
Attendance: 20,000
Referee: Saad Al Fadhli (Kuwait)
26 March 2008
17:00 UTC+5

Turkmenistan	0–2	Jordan
	Report	Al-Bzour 33'; Bawab 86'

Ashgabat Olympic Stadium, Ashgabat
Attendance: 20,000
Referee: Satop Tongkhan (Thailand)

31 May 2008
20:00 UTC+9

South Korea	2–2	Jordan
Park Ji-sung 39'; Park Chu-young 48' (pen.)	Report	Abdel-Fattah 73', 80'

Seoul World Cup Stadium, Seoul
Attendance: 50,000
Referee: Mark Shield (Australia)
2 June 2008
17:00 UTC+5

Turkmenistan	0–0	North Korea
	Report

Ashgabat Olympic Stadium, Ashgabat
Attendance: 20,000
Referee: Khalil Al Ghamdi (Saudi Arabia)

7 June 2008
17:00 UTC+9

North Korea	1–0	Turkmenistan
Choe Kum-chol 72'	Report

Kim Il Sung Stadium, Pyongyang
Attendance: 25,000
Referee: Saad Al Fadhli (Kuwait)
7 June 2008
17:30 UTC+3

Jordan	0–1	South Korea
	Report	Park Chu-young 24' (pen.)

King Abdullah Stadium, Amman
Attendance: 8,000
Referee: Masoud Moradi (Iran)

14 June 2008
17:00 UTC+9

North Korea	2–0	Jordan
Hong Yong-jo 44', 72'	Report

Yanggakdo Stadium, Pyongyang
Attendance: 25,000
Referee: Talaat Najm (Lebanon)
14 June 2008
19:00 UTC+5

Turkmenistan	1–3	South Korea
Ovekov 77' (pen.)	Report	Kim Do-heon 14', 86', 90+3' (pen.)

Ashgabat Olympic Stadium, Ashgabat
Attendance: 11,000
Referee: Hiroyoshi Takayama (Japan)

22 June 2008
20:00 UTC+9

South Korea	0–0	North Korea
	Report

Seoul World Cup Stadium, Seoul
Attendance: 48,519
Referee: Subkhiddin Mohd Salleh (Malaysia)
22 June 2008
18:00 UTC+3

Jordan	2–0	Turkmenistan
Abdel Fattah 66', 67'	Report

Amman International Stadium, Amman
Attendance: 150
Referee: Ben Williams (Australia)

== Group 4 ==
Pos	Team	Pld	W	D	L	GF	GA	GD	Pts	Qualification	(Uzbekistan)	(Saudi Arabia)	(Singapore)	(Lebanon)
1	Uzbekistan	6	5	0	1	17	7	+10	15 (Note: The positions of Uzbekistan and Saudi Arabia are reversed from the original final standings after two matches were forfeited by Singapore.)	Fourth round	—	3–0	3–0 (Note: Awarded as a 3–0 win as Singapore fielded an ineligible player.)	3–0
2	Saudi Arabia	6	5	0	1	15	5	+10	15	Fourth round	4–0	—	2–0	4–1
3	Singapore	6	2	0	4	7	16	−9	6		3–7	0–3	—	2–0
4	Lebanon	6	0	0	6	3	14	−11	0		0–1	1–2	1–2	—

Notes:
6 February 2008
18:00 UTC+2

Lebanon	0–1	Uzbekistan
	Report	Ahmedov 44'

Camille Chamoun Sports City Stadium, Beirut
Attendance: 800
Referee: Abdullah Al Hilali (Oman)
6 February 2008
20:15 UTC+3

Saudi Arabia	2–0	Singapore
Al-Qahtani 38'; Mouath 81'	Report

King Fahd International Stadium, Riyadh
Attendance: 10,000
Referee: Muhsen Basma (Syria)

26 March 2008
16:00 UTC+5

Uzbekistan	3–0	Saudi Arabia
Kapadze 45+1'; Shatskikh 65'; Djeparov 67' (pen.)	Report

MHSK Stadium, Tashkent
Attendance: 17,000
Referee: Subkhiddin Mohd Salleh (Malaysia)
26 March 2008
19:30 UTC+8

Singapore	2–0	Lebanon
Đurić 8'; Fazrul 24'	Report

National Stadium, Singapore
Attendance: 10,118
Referee: Hiroyoshi Takayama (Japan)

2 June 2008
19:30 UTC+8

Singapore	3–7	Uzbekistan
Đurić 16'; Mustafić 31' (pen.); Wilkinson 73'	Report	Kapadze 10'; Karpenko 22'; Djeparov 34', 44'; Denisov 42'; Ibrahimov 62'; Shatskikh 88'

National Stadium, Singapore
Attendance: 28,750
Referee: Ali Hamad Al-Badwawi (UAE)
2 June 2008
21:00 UTC+3

Saudi Arabia	4–1	Lebanon
Al-Qahtani 45', 90+1'; Hawsawi 65'; Tukar 83'	Report	El Ali 43'

King Fahd International Stadium, Riyadh
Attendance: 8,000
Referee: Saad Al Fadhli (Kuwait)

7 June 2008
19:00 UTC+5

Uzbekistan	3–0 Awarded (Note: FIFA awarded Uzbekistan a 3–0 win as a result of Singapore fielding the ineligible player Qiu Li. The match originally ended 1–0 to Uzbekistan.)	Singapore
Geynrikh 80'	Report

MHSK Stadium, Tashkent
Attendance: 12,867
Referee: Kim Dong-Jin (South Korea)
7 June 2008
18:00 UTC+3

Lebanon	1–2	Saudi Arabia
Ghaddar 90+3'	Report	Tukar 45+2', 60'

King Fahd International Stadium, Riyadh (Saudi Arabia) (Note: Lebanon-Saudi Arabia match was moved from Beirut to Riyadh, Saudi Arabia.)
Attendance: 2,000
Referee: Satop Tongkhan (Thailand)

14 June 2008
19:30 UTC+8

Singapore	0–3 Awarded (Note: FIFA awarded Saudi Arabia a 3–0 win as a result of Singapore fielding ineligible player Qiu Li. The match originally ended 2–0 to Saudi Arabia.)	Saudi Arabia
	Report	Ab. Otaif 37'; Al-Fraidi 76'

National Stadium, Singapore
Attendance: 23,000
Referee: Ben Williams (Australia)
14 June 2008
19:00 UTC+5

Uzbekistan	3–0	Lebanon
Ahmedov 50', 63'; Djeparov 90+4'	Report

MHSK Stadium, Tashkent
Attendance: 7,000
Referee: Matthew Breeze (Australia)

22 June 2008
18:00 UTC+3

Lebanon	1–2	Singapore
Baihakki 62' (o.g.)	Report	Dayoub 72' (o.g.); Wilkinson 73'

Camille Chamoun Sports City Stadium, Beirut
Attendance: 500
Referee: Masoud Moradi (Iran)
22 June 2008
21:00 UTC+3

Saudi Arabia	4–0	Uzbekistan
Ab. Otaif 5'; Mouath 36', 88'; Al-Harthi 56'	Report

King Fahd International Stadium, Riyadh
Attendance: 5,000
Referee: Yuichi Nishimura (Japan)

== Group 5 ==
Pos	Team	Pld	W	D	L	GF	GA	GD	Pts	Qualification	(Iran)	(United Arab Emirates)	(Syria)	(Kuwait)
1	Iran	6	3	3	0	7	2	+5	12	Fourth round	—	0–0	0–0	2–0
2	United Arab Emirates	6	2	2	2	7	7	0	8	Fourth round	0–1	—	1–3	2–0
3	Syria	6	2	2	2	7	8	−1	8		0–2	1–1	—	1–0
4	Kuwait	6	1	1	4	8	12	−4	4		2–2	2–3	4–2	—

6 February 2008
15:00 UTC+3:30

Iran	0–0	Syria
	Report

Azadi Stadium, Tehran
Attendance: 45,000
Referee: Abdul Malik Bashir (Singapore)
6 February 2008
19:15 UTC+4

United Arab Emirates	2–0	Kuwait
Al Shehhi 14'; Khalil 53'	Report

Al Jazira Mohammed Bin Zayed Stadium, Abu Dhabi
Attendance: 19,000
Referee: Ravshan Irmatov (Uzbekistan)

26 March 2008
14:30 UTC+2

Syria	1–1	United Arab Emirates
Chaabo 2'	Report	Matar 54'

Abbasiyyin Stadium, Damascus
Attendance: 35,000
Referee: Sun Baojie (China PR)
26 March 2008
19:45 UTC+3

Kuwait	2–2	Iran
Ajab 38'; Al-Rashidi 81'	Report	Nikbakht 2'; Hosseini 5'

Al Kuwait Sports Club Stadium, Kuwait City
Attendance: 15,000
Referee: Matthew Breeze (Australia)

2 June 2008
19:00 UTC+4:30

Iran	0–0	United Arab Emirates
	Report

Azadi Stadium, Tehran
Attendance: 50,000
Referee: Lee Gi-Young (South Korea)
2 June 2008
20:00 UTC+3

Syria	1–0	Kuwait
Al-Hussain 52'	Report

Abbasiyyin Stadium, Damascus
Attendance: 25,000
Referee: Salem Mujghef (Jordan)

7 June 2008
20:00 UTC+4

United Arab Emirates	0–1	Iran
	Report	Zandi 8'

Khalifa Bin Zayed Stadium, Al Ain
Attendance: 9,000
Referee: Yuichi Nishimura (Japan)
8 June 2008
20:45 UTC+3

Kuwait	4–2	Syria
Ajab 2', 20', 63'; Al Khouja 57' (o.g.)	Report	Al-Khatib 10', 45+2'

Thamir Stadium, Al Salmiya
Attendance: 10,000
Referee: Abdullah Al Hilali (Oman)

14 June 2008
20:00 UTC+3

Syria	0–2	Iran
	Report	Rezaei 64'; Khalili 90+5'

Abbasiyyin Stadium, Damascus
Attendance: 25,000
Referee: Satop Tongkhan (Thailand)
14 June 2008
20:45 UTC+3

Kuwait	2–3	United Arab Emirates
Ajab 52', 79'	Report	Matar 23', 39'; Mohammed 90+1'

Thamer Stadium, Salmiya
Attendance: 20,000
Referee: Subkhiddin Mohd Salleh (Malaysia)

22 June 2008
20:30 UTC+4:30

Iran	2–0	Kuwait
Nekounam 17'; Rezaei 90+2'	Report

Azadi Stadium, Tehran
Attendance: 20,000
Referee: Sun Baojie (China PR)
22 June 2008
20:00 UTC+4

United Arab Emirates	1–3	Syria
Matar 83' (pen.)	Report	Al Hussain 34', 51'; Malki 90+3'

Al Qatara Stadium, Al Ain
Attendance: 7,000
Referee: Mark Shield (Australia)

== Goalscorers ==
There were 137 goals scored in 60 matches, for an average of 2.28 goals per match.

6 goals

- (Kuwait) Ahmad Ajab

4 goals

- (Jordan) Hassan Abdel Fattah
- (United Arab Emirates) Ismail Matar
- (Uzbekistan) Server Djeparov

3 goals

- (Japan) Yuji Nakazawa
- (North Korea) Hong Yong-jo
- (Saudi Arabia) Yasser Al-Qahtani
- (Saudi Arabia) Malek Mouath
- (Saudi Arabia) Redha Tukar
- (South Korea) Kim Do-heon
- (Syria) Jehad Al-Hussain
- (Uzbekistan) Odil Ahmedov

2 goals

- (Australia) Brett Emerton
- (Australia) Harry Kewell
- (Bahrain) A'ala Hubail
- (Bahrain) Salman Isa
- (Iran) Gholamreza Rezaei
- (Iraq) Emad Mohammed
- (Japan) Yasuhito Endō
- (Japan) Yoshito Ōkubo
- (Oman) Ismail Sulaiman Al Ajmi
- (Oman) Amad Al Hosni
- (Qatar) Fábio César Montezine
- (Saudi Arabia) Abdoh Otaif
- (Singapore) Aleksandar Đurić
- (Singapore) John Wilkinson
- (South Korea) Park Chu-young
- (South Korea) Park Ji-sung
- (South Korea) Seol Ki-hyeon
- (Syria) Firas Al-Khatib
- (Thailand) Teeratep Winothai
- (Uzbekistan) Timur Kapadze
- (Uzbekistan) Maksim Shatskikh

1 goal

- (Australia) Mark Bresciano
- (Australia) Tim Cahill
- (Australia) Joshua Kennedy
- (Bahrain) Faouzi Aaish
- (Bahrain) Ismail Abdullatif
- (Bahrain) Sayed Mohamed Adnan
- (China) Sun Xiang
- (China) Zheng Zhi
- (China) Zhou Haibin
- (Iran) Jalal Hosseini
- (Iran) Mohsen Khalili
- (Iran) Javad Nekounam
- (Iran) Alireza Vahedi Nikbakht
- (Iran) Ferydoon Zandi
- (Iraq) Nashat Akram
- (Iraq) Hawar Mulla Mohammed
- (Japan) Seiichiro Maki
- (Japan) Kengo Nakamura
- (Japan) Shunsuke Nakamura
- (Japan) Marcus Tulio Tanaka
- (Japan) Atsuto Uchida
- (Jordan) Waseem Al-Bzour
- (Jordan) Thaer Bawab
- (Kuwait) Fahad Al-Rashidi
- (Lebanon) Mahmoud El Ali
- (Lebanon) Mohammed Ghaddar
- (North Korea) Choe Kum-chol
- (Oman) Ahmed Mubarak Al Mahaijri
- (Qatar) Sayed Ali Bechir
- (Qatar) Khalfan Ibrahim
- (Qatar) Sebastián Soria
- (Saudi Arabia) Ahmed Al-Fraidi
- (Saudi Arabia) Saad Al-Harthi
- (Saudi Arabia) Osama Hawsawi
- (Singapore) Mustafic Fahrudin
- (Singapore) Fazrul Nawaz
- (South Korea) Kwak Tae-hwi
- (Syria) Zyad Chaabo
- (Syria) Sanharib Malki
- (Thailand) Sarayoot Chaikamdee
- (Thailand) Totchtawan Sripan
- (Thailand) Datsakorn Thonglao
- (Turkmenistan) Guvanch Ovekov
- (United Arab Emirates) Saif Mohammed Al Bishr
- (United Arab Emirates) Mohamed Al Shehhi
- (United Arab Emirates) Faisal Khalil
- (Uzbekistan) Vitaliy Denisov
- (Uzbekistan) Alexander Geynrikh
- (Uzbekistan) Aziz Ibrahimov
- (Uzbekistan) Victor Karpenko

1 own goal

- (Lebanon) Ramez Dayoub (against Singapore)
- (Singapore) Baihakki Khaizan (against Lebanon)
- (Syria) Anas Al Khouja (against Kuwait)
