= Radhi Jaïdi =

Tunisian footballer and manager

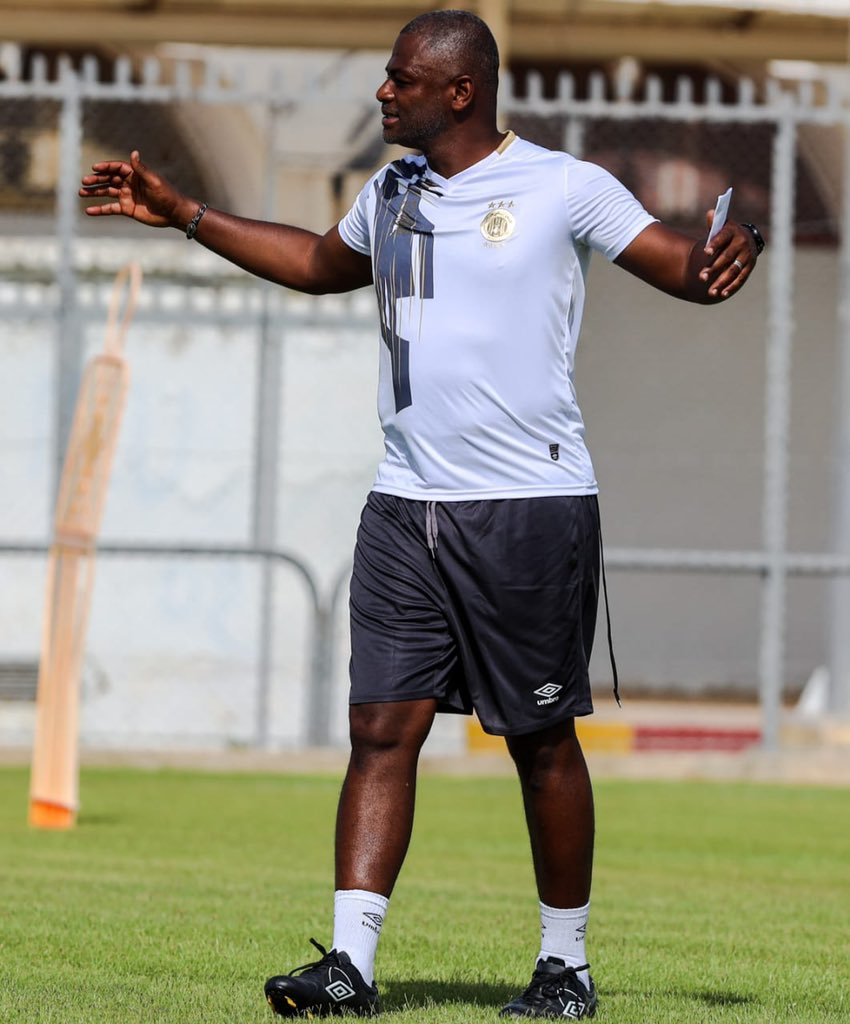
- Jaïdi in 2021

Personal information
- Full name: Radhi Ben Abdelmajid Jaïdi
- Date of birth: 30 August 1975 (age 51)
- Place of birth: Gabès, Tunisia
- Height: 1.92 m (6 ft 4 in)
- Position: Centre back

Youth career
- 1988–1992: Stade Gabèsien
- 1992–1993: Espérance de Tunis

Senior career*
Years	Team	Apps	(Gls)
1993–2004	Espérance de Tunis	288	(20)
2004–2006	Bolton Wanderers	43	(8)
2006–2009	Birmingham City	86	(6)
2009–2012	Southampton	58	(4)
Total		475	(38)

International career
1996–2009	Tunisia	105	(7)

Managerial career
- 2017–2019: Southampton U-23
- 2019–2020: Hartford Athletic
- 2021: Cercle Brugge (assistant)
- 2021–2022: Espérance de Tunis
- 2025–2026: Nejmeh
Medal record
Men's football
Representing Tunisia
Africa Cup of Nations
Winner	2004 Tunisia
- * Club domestic league appearances and goals

Radhi Ben Abdelmajid Jaïdi (Arabic: راضي بن عبد المجيد الجعايدي; born 30 August 1975) is a Tunisian football coach and former player.

Jaïdi was previously head coach of the under-23 team at Southampton, head coach of USL Championship team Hartford Athletic, assistant coach at Belgian side Cercle Brugge and head coach at Espérance de Tunis. As a player, he operated as a centre back.

== Club career ==
=== Espérance ===
Before coming to England, Jaïdi was the only player at the time to have won all four of Africa’s annual cup competitions – all with Espérance.

=== Bolton Wanderers ===
Jaïdi signed for Bolton Wanderers on a free transfer in July 2004 from Espérance Sportive de Tunis, who won the Tunisian league title the season before. Jaïdi became the first Tunisian player to play in the Premier League with Bolton.

=== Birmingham City ===
Jaïdi joined Birmingham City in the summer of 2006 for £2 million. He made his debut in a 1–0 win over Crystal Palace in the early stages of the season although he almost scored an own goal in this match. After three years with the club, he was not offered another deal when his contract expired at the end of June 2009.

=== Southampton ===
In August 2009, Jaïdi passed a medical and agreed personal terms with Football League One club Southampton, but the transfer stalled when doubts arose over the player's eligibility for a work permit. However, on 2 September 2009, the club confirmed that Jaïdi had signed a two-year contract, subject to work-permit clearance. He received his international clearance on 10 September, and made his debut as a 77th-minute substitute at Charlton two days later. He scored his first goal for the Saints in a 1–1 draw away to Carlisle United on 26 September; the 95th-minute goal came from a free kick which earned his side the draw. His first goal in the 2010–11 season came in a 4–1 victory over Huddersfield Town.

He retired at the end of the 2011–12 season, having failed to make a first team appearance as he struggled with injury but remained at Southampton in an international development role.

== International career ==
Jaïdi was also a regular in the Tunisia line-up and was selected by coach Roger Lemerre for the 2006 World Cup. He scored the goal which secured a 2–2 draw in their opening game against Saudi Arabia. He had previously been part of Tunisia's 2004 African Nations Cup-winning squad, and played in the 2006 World Cup. He captained the Tunisian national team in the 2008 Africa Cup of Nations, where they went out in the quarter finals to Cameroon.

== Coaching career ==
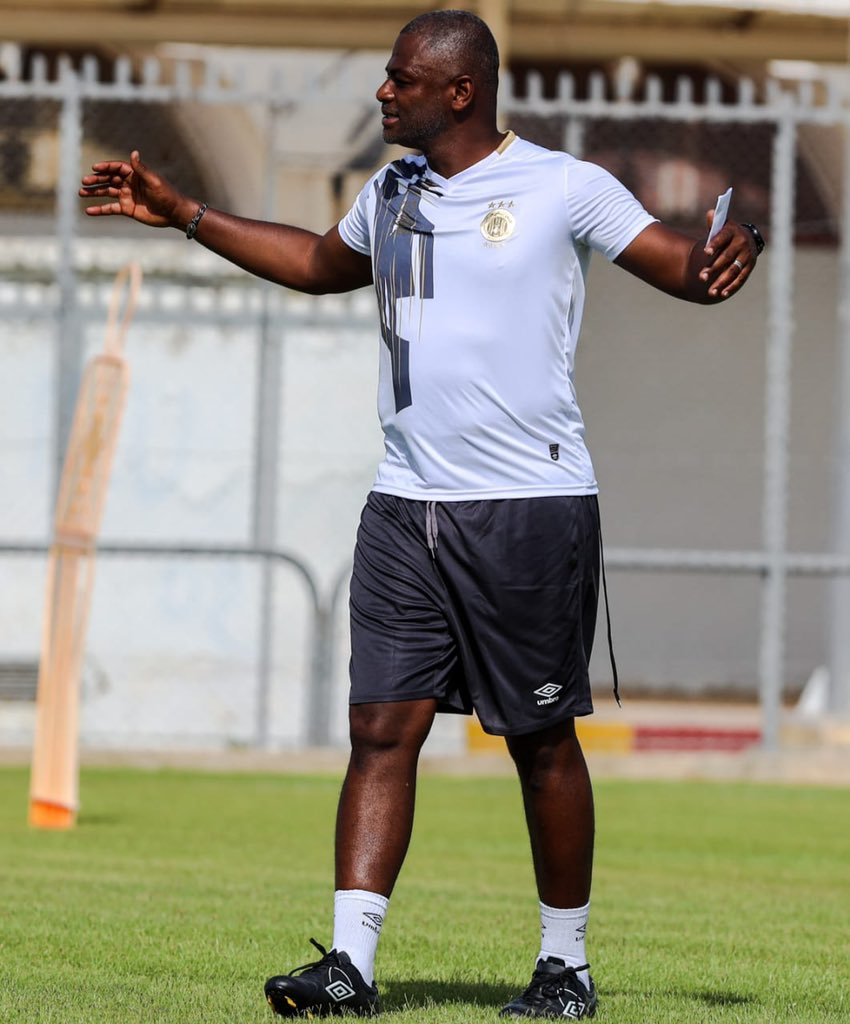
Radhi Jaidi in charge of Espérance de Tunis

Following the culmination of his playing career at Southampton, Jaïdi became head coach of Southampton under-23’s.

In August 2019 he was linked with the vacant Tunisia national team manager job.

On 7 November 2019 American team Hartford Athletic announced that Jaidi has been named the club's head coach for the 2020 USL season, subject to the completion of relevant documentation. He said he hoped the job would allow him to return to coach in Europe in the future.

In February 2021, Jaidi was hired as an assistant coach for Belgian First Division A club Cercle Brugge until August 2021.

In August 2021, he joined his former club Espérance de Tunis as a head coach. On 25 September 2021, he won his first prize with his team by beating CS Sfaxien in the supercup. On 8 June 2022, he was sacked due to poor results after the elimination from Tunisian Cup against CS M'saken.

On 13 August 2025, Jaïdi was appointed head coach of Lebanese Premier League club Nejmeh.

== Personal life ==
Jaïdi was born in Gabès. His mother raised him on her own after his father died when he was eleven years old.

== Career statistics ==
=== International ===
Scores and results list Tunisia's goal tally first.

No	Date	Venue	Opponent	Score	Result	Competition
1	27 February 1999	Stade El Menzah, Tunis, Tunisia	Uganda	2–0	6–0	2000 Africa Cup of Nations qualification
2	3 February 2000	Sani Abacha Stadium, Kano, Nigeria	Congo	1–0	1–0	2000 Africa Cup of Nations
3	7 April 2000	Stade Olympique, Nouakchott, Mauritania	Mauritania	1–0	2–1	2002 FIFA World Cup qualification
4	7 October 2000	Stade El Menzah, Tunis, Tunisia	Gabon	2–2	4–2	2002 Africa Cup of Nations qualification
5	14 June 2006	FIFA WM Stadion München, Munich, Germany	Saudi Arabia	2–2	2–2	2006 FIFA World Cup
6	15 June 2008	Prince Louis Rwagasore Stadium, Bujumbura, Burundi	Burundi	1–0	1–0	2010 FIFA World Cup qualification
7	28 May 2009	Stade Olympique de Radès, Radès, Tunisia	Sudan	3–0	4–0	Friendly
Correct as of 13 January 2017

== Honours ==
=== Player ===
ES Tunis

- Tunisian Ligue Professionnelle 1: 1993–94, 1997–98, 1998–99, 1999–2000, 2000–01, 2001–02, 2002–03, 2003–04
- Tunisian Cup: 1996–97, 1998–99
- Tunisian Super Cup: 2001
- CAF Champions League: 1994
- African Cup Winners' Cup: 1998
- CAF Cup: 1997
- CAF Super Cup: 1995
- Arab Super Cup: 1996

Southampton

- Football League Trophy: 2010

Tunisia

- Africa Cup of Nations: 2004

=== Manager ===
ES Tunis

- Tunisian Super Cup: 2020–21

== See also ==
- List of men's footballers with 100 or more international caps
