= Yasser Al-Qahtani =

Saudi Arabian footballer (born 1982)

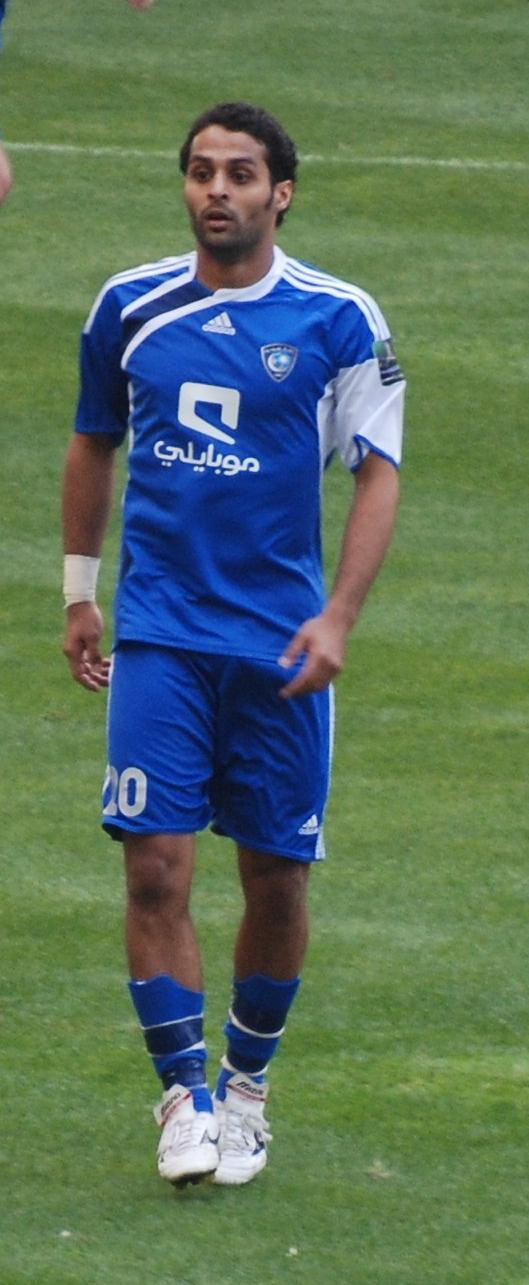
- Al-Qahtani with Al-Hilal in 2009

Personal information
- Full name: Yasser Saeed Mosleh Abdulrahman Al-Qahtani
- Date of birth: 10 October 1982 (age 44)
- Place of birth: Khobar, Saudi Arabia
- Height: 1.77 m (5 ft 9 1/2 in)
- Position: Forward

Youth career
- 1996-2000: Al-Qadsiah

Senior career*
Years	Team	Apps	(Gls)
2000–2005	Al-Qadisiya	41	(24)
2005–2018	Al-Hilal	160	(88)
2011–2012	→ Al Ain (loan)	15	(7)
Total		214	(119)

International career^{‡}
2002–2013	Saudi Arabia	108	(42)
Medal record
Representing Saudi Arabia
Men's Football
AFC Asian Cup
Runner-up	2007 Indonesia/Malaysia/ Thailand/Vietnam
- * Club domestic league appearances and goals as of 19:09, 12 April 2018 (UTC) ‡ National team caps and goals as of 14 November 2015

Yasser Saeed Mosleh Abdulrahman Al-Qahtani (Arabic: يَاسِر سَعِيد مُصْلِح عَبْد الرَّحْمٰن الْقَحْطَانِيّ; born 10 October 1982) is a Saudi Arabian former footballer who played as a forward for Al-Hilal FC in the Saudi Professional League. He was also captain of the Saudi Arabia national team.

== Club career ==
In 2005, Al-Qahtani moved to Al-Hilal from Al-Qadisiyah for a reported £2.5 million transfer fee.

After leading Saudi Arabia to the finals of the 2007 AFC Asian Cup as one of the tournament's top scorers, Al-Qahtani won the Asian Footballer of the Year award. He went on trial at Manchester City in December.

In 2011, struggling for form following injuries and having lost his place in the Al-Hilal starting lineup, Al-Qahtani joined United Arab Emirates club Al Ain on a season-long loan. There he contributed to the club's first league title since 2004, scoring 7 goals in 15 league appearances, and 12 goals in a total of 26 games across all competitions. Having regained his form, he returned to Al-Hilal after the loan spell ended.

Coached by Sami Al-Jaber and Laurențiu Reghecampf, Al-Qahtani reached the finals of the 2014 AFC Champions League with Al-Hilal where his team finished runners up losing to Western Sydney Wanderers in the final 1–0 on aggregate.

== International career ==
=== 2006 World Cup ===
Al-Qahtani played in the 2006 FIFA World Cup in Germany where he scored a goal against Tunisia.

=== 2007 Asian Cup ===
At the 2007 AFC Asian Cup, Saudi Arabia reached the final under new Brazilian coach dos Anjos with Al-Qahtani becoming the tournament's top scorer.

=== 2010 World Cup qualification campaign ===
In the final stages of the 2010 World Cup qualification, Al-Qahtani was injured in the game against Uzbekistan and upon his return from injury remained out form due to lack of playing time at Al-Hilal. Saudi Arabia missed qualification to the World Cup failing to beat North Korea at home in Riyadh in the decisive last game with the match ending goalless.

== Career statistics ==
=== Club ===
As of 12 April 2018

Club	Season	League		Cup		ACL		Total	
Club	Season	Apps	Goals	Apps	Goals	Apps	Goals	Apps	Goals
Al-Qadisiyah	2000–01	9	5	–				9	5
Al-Qadisiyah	2002–03	10	5	1	0	—		11	5
Al-Qadisiyah	2003–04	10	9	2	0	—		12	9
Al-Qadisiyah	2004–05	10	5	5	4	—		15	9
Al-Hilal	2005–06	13	7	5	1	3	1	21	9
Al-Hilal	2006–07	16	10	4	0	4	0	24	10
Al-Hilal	2007–08	16	10	8	6	2	0	26	16
Al-Hilal	2008–09	16	10	7	1	5	2	28	13
Al-Hilal	2009–10	20	9	9	6	6	4	35	19
Al-Hilal	2010–11	16	11	3	2	10	5	29	18
Al-Ain (loan)	2011-12	15	7	8	5	—		23	12
Al-Hilal	2012–13	20	13	3	1	6	2	29	16
Al-Hilal	2013–14	16	5	6	3	7	2	29	10
Al-Hilal	2014–15	9	3	—		5	0	14	3
Al-Hilal	2015–16	12	6	5	2	5	1	22	9
Al-Hilal	2016–17	12	4	5	2	2	0	19	6
Al-Hilal	2017–18	4	0	2	1	5	1	11	2
Al-Hilal	Al-Hilal Total	170	88	55	26	54	18	289	132
Career Total		214	119	71	35	54	18	354	172

=== International ===
==== International goals ====
Scores and results list Saudi Arabia's goal tally first.

#	Date	Venue	Opponent	Score	Result	Competition
1.	26 December 2002	Al Kuwait Sports Club Stadium, Kuwait City	Yemen	1–1	2–2	2002 Arab Nations Cup
2.	26 December 2002	Al Kuwait Sports Club Stadium, Kuwait City	Yemen	2–2	2–2	2002 Arab Nations Cup
3.	8 October 2003	Prince Abdullah al-Faisal Stadium, Jeddah	Bhutan	4–0	6–0	2004 AFC Asian Cup qualification
4.	6 January 2004	Kazma SC Stadium, Kuwait City	Oman	2–1	2–2	16th Arabian Gulf Cup
5.	8 January 2004	Kazma SC Stadium, Kuwait City	Yemen	1–0	2–0	16th Arabian Gulf Cup
6.	8 January 2004	Kazma SC Stadium, Kuwait City	Yemen	2–0	2–0	16th Arabian Gulf Cup
7.	18 February 2004	King Fahd International Stadium, Riyadh	Indonesia	3–0	3–0	2006 FIFA World Cup qualification
8.	18 July 2004	Sichuan Longquanyi Stadium, Chengdu	Turkmenistan	1–1	2–2	2004 AFC Asian Cup
9.	18 July 2004	Sichuan Longquanyi Stadium, Chengdu	Turkmenistan	2–1	2–2	2004 AFC Asian Cup
10.	1 September 2004	King Fahd International Stadium, Riyadh	Kuwait	1–1	1–1	Friendly
11.	8 September 2004	Olympic Stadium, Ashgabat	Turkmenistan	1–0	1–0	2006 FIFA World Cup qualification
12.	12 October 2004	Gelora Bung Karno Stadium, Jakarta	Indonesia	3–1	3–1	2006 FIFA World Cup qualification
13.	11 December 2004	Ahmed bin Ali Stadium, Doha	Kuwait	1–0	1–2	17th Arabian Gulf Cup
14.	25 March 2005	Prince Mohamed bin Fahd Stadium, Dammam	South Korea	2–0	2–0	2006 FIFA World Cup qualification
15.	14 February 2006	Prince Abdullah al-Faisal Stadium, Jeddah	Syria	1–0	1–1	Friendly
16.	14 June 2006	Allianz Arena, Munich	Tunisia	1–1	2–2	2006 FIFA World Cup
17.	9 August 2006	Prince Mohamed bin Fahd Stadium, Dammam	Bahrain	1–0	1–0	Friendly
18.	16 August 2006	Salt Lake Stadium, Calcutta	India	1–0	3–0	2007 AFC Asian Cup qualification
19.	16 August 2006	Salt Lake Stadium, Calcutta	India	2–0	3–0	2007 AFC Asian Cup qualification
20.	16 August 2006	Salt Lake Stadium, Calcutta	India	3–0	3–0	2007 AFC Asian Cup qualification
21.	11 October 2006	Sapporo Dome, Sapporo	Japan	1–2	1–3	2007 AFC Asian Cup qualification
22.	8 January 2007	Prince Mohamed bin Fahd Stadium, Dammam	Gambia	2–0	3–0	Friendly
23.	8 January 2007	Prince Mohamed bin Fahd Stadium, Dammam	Gambia	3–0	3–0	Friendly
24.	18 January 2007	Al-Nahyan Stadium, Abu Dhabi	Bahrain	1–1	2–1	18th Arabian Gulf Cup
25.	18 January 2007	Al-Nahyan Stadium, Abu Dhabi	Bahrain	2–1	2–1	18th Arabian Gulf Cup
26.	24 January 2007	Al-Nahyan Stadium, Abu Dhabi	Iraq	1–0	1–0	18th Arabian Gulf Cup
27.	11 July 2007	Gelora Bung Karno Stadium, Jakarta	South Korea	1–1	1–1	2007 AFC Asian Cup
28.	14 July 2007	Gelora Bung Karno Stadium, Jakarta	Indonesia	1–0	2–1	2007 AFC Asian Cup
29.	22 July 2007	Gelora Bung Karno Stadium, Jakarta	Uzbekistan	1–0	2–1	2007 AFC Asian Cup
30.	25 July 2007	Mỹ Đình National Stadium, Hanoi	Japan	1–0	3–2	2007 AFC Asian Cup
31.	11 September 2007	King Fahd International Stadium, Riyadh	Ghana	1–0	5–0	Friendly
32.	11 September 2007	King Fahd International Stadium, Riyadh	Ghana	3–0	5–0	Friendly
33.	9 November 2007	Prince Abdullah al-Faisal Stadium, Jeddah	Estonia	2–0	2–0	Friendly
34.	25 November 2007	Cairo International Stadium, Cairo	Egypt	1–2	1–2	2007 Pan Arab Games
35.	30 January 2008	King Fahd International Stadium, Riyadh	Luxembourg	2–0	2–1	Friendly
36.	6 February 2008	King Fahd International Stadium, Riyadh	Singapore	1–0	2–0	2010 FIFA World Cup qualification
37.	2 June 2008	King Fahd International Stadium, Riyadh	Lebanon	1–1	4–1	2010 FIFA World Cup qualification
38.	2 June 2008	King Fahd International Stadium, Riyadh	Lebanon	4–1	4–1	2010 FIFA World Cup qualification
39.	8 January 2009	Royal Oman Police Stadium, Muscat	Yemen	1–0	6–0	19th Arabian Gulf Cup
40.	11 January 2009	Sultan Qaboos Sports Complex, Muscat	United Arab Emirates	1–0	3–0	19th Arabian Gulf Cup
41.	4 June 2009	TEDA Football Stadium, Tianjin	China	1–0	4–1	Friendly
42.	9 January 2013	Khalifa Sports City Stadium, Isa Town	Yemen	1–0	2–0	21st Arabian Gulf Cup

== Honours ==
=== Club ===
Al-Hilal

- Saudi Professional League (5): 2007–08, 2009–10, 2010–11, 2016–17, 2017–18
- Crown Prince Cup (7): 2005–06, 2007–08, 2008–09, 2009–10, 2010–11, 2012–13, 2015–16
- Saudi Super Cup (1): 2015
- King Cup (2): 2015, 2017
- Federation Cup (1): 2005–06
- AFC Champions League: Runner-up 2014, 2017

Al Ain

- UAE Arabian Gulf League (1): 2011–12

=== International ===
Saudi Arabia

- AFC Asian Cup: Runner-up 2007
- Arabian Gulf Cup (1): 2003
- Arab Nations Cup (1): 2002
- Islamic Solidarity Games: 2005

=== Individual ===
- AFC Asian Footballer of the Year: 2007
- AFC Asian Cup Top scorer: 2007 (shared)
- AFC Asian Cup Fans' All Time Best XI: 2018

== See also ==
- List of men's footballers with 100 or more international caps
