= Yusri Al-Bashah =

Arabian football Forward

Yusri Al Bashah
Personal information
- Date of birth: 27 July 1979 (age 47)
- Place of birth: Saudi Arabia
- Position: Forward

Youth career
- Al-Adalah

Senior career*
| Years | Team | Apps | (Gls) |
| 2000–2002 | Al-Adalah | | |
| 2002–2009 | Al Ittifaq | | |
| 2009–2010 | Al Khaleej | | |
| 2010–2012 | Al-Adalah | | |

International career
| 2003–2004 | Saudi Arabia | 16 | (9) |
- * Club domestic league appearances and goals

Yusri Al Basha (Arabic:يسري الباشا) is a Saudi football forward who played for Saudi Arabia in the 2004 Asian Cup. He also played for Al Ittifaq and Al Khaleej.

== Career statistics ==
=== International ===
Appearances and goals by national team and year
| National team | Year | Apps | Goals |
|---|---|---|---|
| Saudi Arabia | 2003 | 9 | 8 |
| Saudi Arabia | 2004 | 5 | 0 |
| Saudi Arabia | 2005 | 2 | 1 |
| Total | | 16 | 9 |

Scores and results list Saudi Arabia's goal tally first, score column indicates score after each Al-Bashah goal.

List of international goals scored by Yusri Al-Bashah
| No. | Date | Venue | Opponent | Score | Result | Competition |
|---|---|---|---|---|---|---|
| 1 | 23 April 2003 | Prince Abdullah Al-Faisal Sports City Stadium, Jeddah, Saudi Arabia | Syria | 1–0 | 1–1 | Friendly |
| 2 | 6 October 2003 | Prince Abdullah Al-Faisal Sports City Stadium, Jeddah, Saudi Arabia | Yemen | 1–0 | 7–0 | 2004 AFC Asian Cup qualification |
| 3 | 6 October 2003 | Prince Abdullah Al-Faisal Sports City Stadium, Jeddah, Saudi Arabia | Yemen | 2–0 | 7–0 | 2004 AFC Asian Cup qualification |
| 4 | 6 October 2003 | Prince Abdullah Al-Faisal Sports City Stadium, Jeddah, Saudi Arabia | Yemen | 3–0 | 7–0 | 2004 AFC Asian Cup qualification |
| 5 | 6 October 2003 | Prince Abdullah Al-Faisal Sports City Stadium, Jeddah, Saudi Arabia | Yemen | 4–0 | 7–0 | 2004 AFC Asian Cup qualification |
| 6 | 8 October 2003 | Prince Abdullah Al-Faisal Sports City Stadium, Jeddah, Saudi Arabia | Bhutan | 1–0 | 6–0 | 2004 AFC Asian Cup qualification |
| 7 | 10 October 2003 | Prince Abdullah Al-Faisal Sports City Stadium, Jeddah, Saudi Arabia | Indonesia | 2–0 | 5–0 | 2004 AFC Asian Cup qualification |
| 8 | 10 October 2003 | Prince Abdullah Al-Faisal Sports City Stadium, Jeddah, Saudi Arabia | Indonesia | 3–0 | 5–0 | 2004 AFC Asian Cup qualification |
| 9 | 18 March 2005 | Prince Mohamed bin Fahd Stadium, Dammam, Saudi Arabia | Finland | 1–1 | 1–4 | Friendly |
