= Abdoh Otaif =

Saudi Arabian footballer (born 1984)

Personal information
- Date of birth: 2 April 1984 (age 42)
- Place of birth: Saudi Arabia
- Height: 1.72 m (5 ft 8 in)
- Position: Attacking midfielder

Youth career
- 1998-2003: Al-Shabab

Senior career*
Years	Team	Apps	(Gls)
2003–2011	Al-Shabab		(26)
2011–2012	Ittihad FC	3	(0)
2012–2014	Al-Nassr	35	(2)
2014–2015	Al-Shabab	15	(0)
2019	Al-Anwar		

International career
2004–2011	Saudi Arabia	63	(6)
- * Club domestic league appearances and goals

Abdoh Ibrahim Otaif (born 2 April 1984) is a Saudi Arabia former professional footballer who played as an Attacking midfielder for Al-Shabab in Riyadh and the Saudi Arabia national team. In 2010 he was called up for the 2010 World Cup qualifiers against Singapore and Uzbekistan.

== His beginning with Al-Shabab ==
Otaif began his career with Al-Shabab during the 2003–04 season. He was 20 years old at that time, but was able to win the Saudi Premier League with his club that year, even though him and many other Al-Shabab players were very young.

== Personal life ==
Otaif is only one of the many Otaif family players in Al-Shabab. Also he has a brother, Ahmed Otaif, who is one year younger than him, and Ali Otaif, both with Abdoh in Al-Shabab's first team. There is also Saqr and Abdullah Otaif, both are in the U-19 Al-Shabab and U-16 Al-Shabab team. All five siblings have gone through the youth teams of Saudi Arabia.

== Career statistics ==
Scores and results list Saudi Arabia's goal tally first.

No	Date	Venue	Opponent	Score	Result	Competition
1.	30 January 2008	King Fahd International Stadium, Riyadh, Saudi Arabia	Luxembourg	1–0	2–1	Friendly
2.	14 June 2008	National Stadium, Kallang, Singapore	Singapore	3–0	4–0	2010 FIFA World Cup qualification
3.	22 June 2008	King Fahd International Stadium, Riyadh, Saudi Arabia	Uzbekistan	1–0	4–0	2010 FIFA World Cup qualification
4.	30 August 2008	King Fahd International Stadium, Riyadh, Saudi Arabia	Qatar	1–1	2–1	Friendly
5.	10 September 2008	Zayed Sports City Stadium, Abu Dhabi, United Arab Emirates	United Arab Emirates	1–1	2–1	2010 FIFA World Cup qualification
6.	1 April 2009	King Fahd International Stadium, Riyadh, Saudi Arabia	United Arab Emirates	1–0	3–2	2010 FIFA World Cup qualification

== Honours ==
Club and national team

- Saudi Premier League: 2004, 2006
- Saudi Champions Cup: 2008, 2009
- Saudi Federation cup: 2009, 2010

Runner-up

- AFC Asian Cup: 2007
- Saudi Premier League: 2005
- Crown Prince Cup: 2009

Winner

Al-Nassr

- 2013–14 Saudi Crown Prince Cup
- Saudi Professional League 2013–14
