= Kunming Tuodong Sports Center =

Multi-purpose stadium in Kunming, Yunnan, China

Coordinates: 25°02′17″N 102°43′43″E

- Interactive map of Kunming Tuodong Sports Center
- Capacity: 35,000
- Public transit: 3 at Tuodong Stadium

Construction
- Opened: 1958

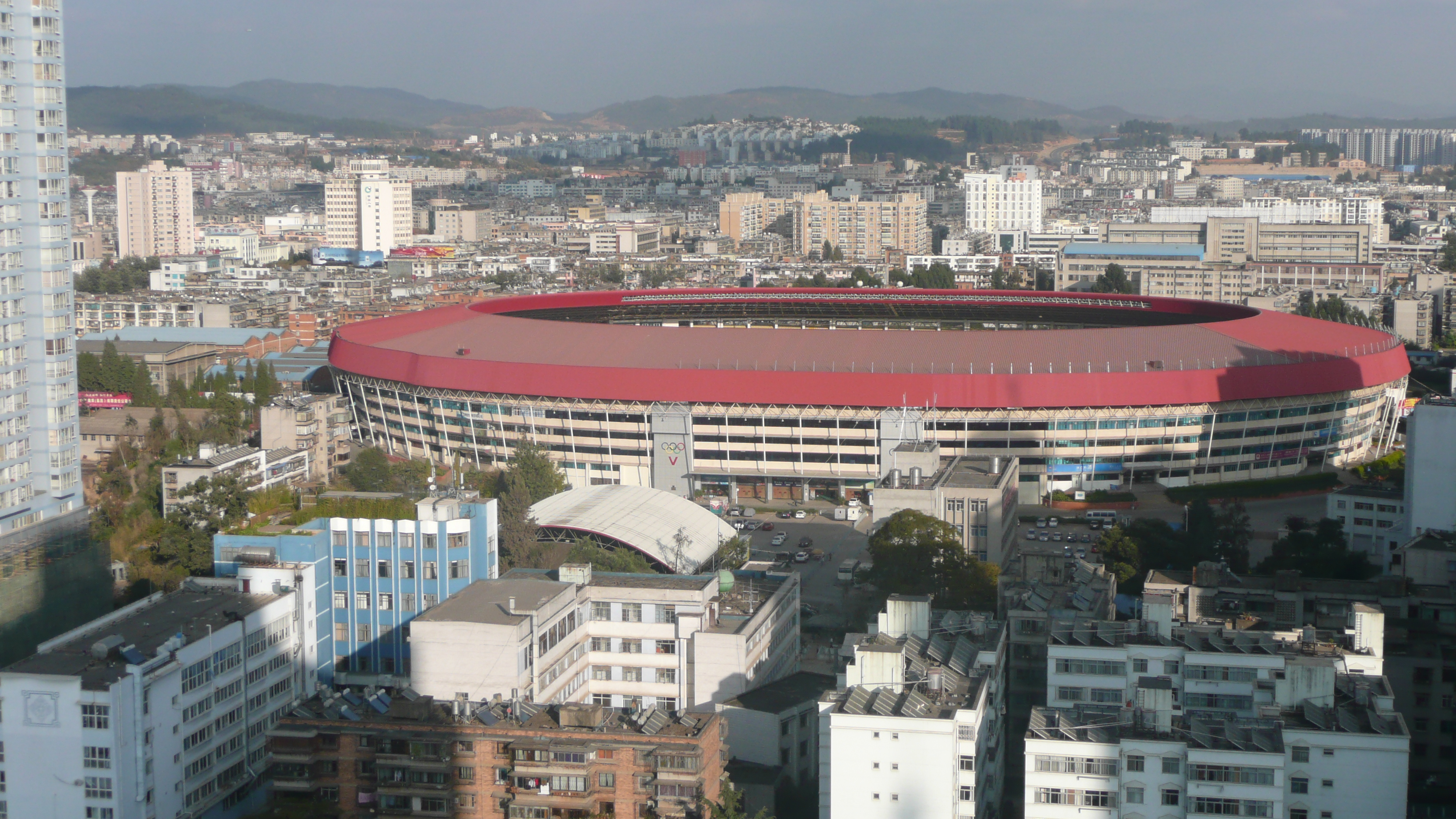
Tuodong Sports Centre

The Kunming Tuodong Sports Center or Tuodong Stadium (Chinese: 拓东体育场) is a multi-purpose stadium in Kunming, China. The stadium is located at 99 Dongfeng East Road in the downtown center of Kunming City at the elevation of 1,891m and occupying 5.4 ha. It is currently used mostly for football matches.

Tuodong Sports Center is one of the major sports centers in Yunnan province and Kunming City for physical training and various types of races and contests. The stadium is equipped with glass fiber-reinforced plastic chairs that can accommodate 35,000 people. The football field in the center is of international standard at 105 x 68 m and surrounded by 8 plastic tracks. A great many international sports events and matches of large scales have been conducted in the center.

Other facilities in Tuodong Sports Center include swimming pools, well-equipped gymnasium, Ping-Pong rooms, etc. All are compliant to relevant international standards, and ideal for training and matches for basketball, volleyball, judo, fencing and martial arts.

== Events ==
- China hosted Australia here on its 2010 FIFA World Cup qualification campaign. The match took place on 26 March 2008 and ended 0-0.
- China hosted Laos here on its 2014 FIFA World Cup qualification campaign. The match took place on 23 July 2011 and ended 7–2 in the favour of the home side.
- China hosted Singapore here on its 2014 FIFA World Cup qualification campaign. The match took place on 2 September 2011 and ended 2–1 in the favour of the home side.
