= Hamad Al-Montashari =

Saudi Arabian footballer

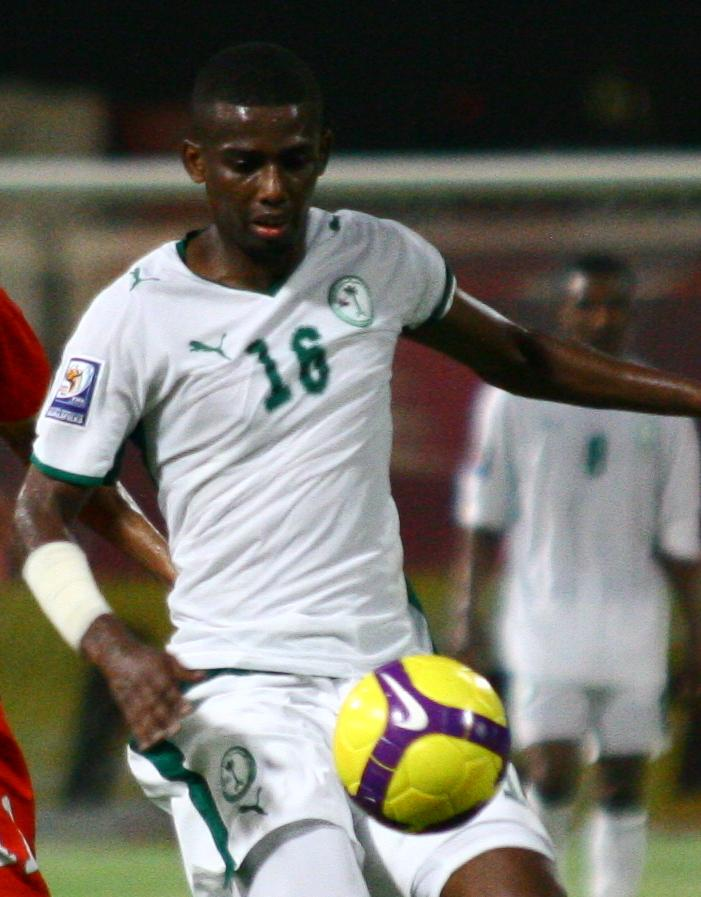
- Al-Montashari playing for Saudi Arabia in 2009

Personal information
- Full name: Hamad Mohsen Al-Montashari
- Date of birth: 22 June 1982 (age 44)
- Place of birth: Jeddah, Saudi Arabia
- Height: 1.86 m (6 ft 1 in)
- Position: Centre back

Senior career*
Years	Team	Apps	(Gls)
2001–2016	Al-Ittihad	300	(61)

International career^{‡}
2002–2011	Saudi Arabia	54	(8)
- * Club domestic league appearances and goals as of June 22, 2011 ‡ National team caps and goals as of June 22, 2011

Hamad Mohsen Al-Montashari (also spelled Al-Montazeri; Arabic: حمد المُنتشري, Hamad al-Muntasharī; born 22 June 1982) is a Saudi Arabian former footballer who spent his entire career for Al-Ittihad. A central defender, Al-Montashari became the 2005 Asian Football Player of the Year, finishing ahead of Uzbekistani Maksim Shatskikh in the polls. He represented Saudi Arabia at the 2006 FIFA World Cup and two AFC Asian Cups.

== Honours ==
=== International ===
Saudi Arabia

- Islamic Solidarity Games: 2005
