= Mohammed Ameen =

Saudi Arabian footballer

Personal information
- Full name: Mohammed Ameen Haidar Al-Awlaqi
- Date of birth: April 29, 1980 (age 46)
- Place of birth: Jeddah, Saudi Arabia
- Height: 1.75 m (5 ft 9 in)
- Position: Midfielder

Senior career*
Years	Team	Apps	(Gls)
1999–2009	Al-Ittihad		
2009–2010	Al-Hazm		
2010–2011	Al-Qadisiyah	12	(1)

International career^{‡}
2003–2006	Saudi Arabia	20	(7)
- * Club domestic league appearances and goals as of 13 June 2011 ‡ National team caps and goals as of 23 June 2006

Mohammed Ameen Haidar (Arabic: محمد أمين حيدر العولقي; born April 29, 1980) is a Saudi Arabian former footballer who played as a midfielder. who is the assistant coach of the Saudi Arabia national team. He was a member of the Al Ittihad team that won the 2005 AFC Champions League and the 2006 FIFA World Cup with Saudi Arabia.

== Honours ==
=== Club ===
Al Ittihad

- AFC Champions League: 2005

=== International ===
Saudi Arabia

- Islamic Solidarity Games: 2005
