= Malek Mouath =

Saudi Arabian footballer

Personal information
- Full name: Malek Mouath Al-Hawsawi
- Date of birth: 10 August 1981 (age 45)
- Place of birth: Medina, Saudi Arabia
- Height: 1.67 m (5 ft 5 1/2 in)
- Position: Forward

Youth career
- Al-Ansar

Senior career*
Years	Team	Apps	(Gls)
2000–2004	Al-Ansar	53	(4)
2004–2012	Al-Ahli	115	(57)
2010	→ Al-Arabi (loan)	0	(0)
2011-2012	→ Al-Nassr (loan)	16	(3)
Total		184	(64)

International career^{‡}
2006–2009	Saudi Arabia	42	(15)
- * Club domestic league appearances and goals as of 14 June 2006 ‡ National team caps and goals as of 23 June 2006

Malek Ali Mouath Al-Hawsawi (Arabic: مالك علي معاذ الهوساوي, born 10 August 1981) is a Saudi Arabian former professional footballer.

Mouath originally played as an attacking midfielder but was converted into a striker after moving to Al Ahli.

He played for the Saudi Arabia national team and participated in the 2006 FIFA World Cup.

== Club career ==
=== Early life ===
Mouath was born in Medina, Saudi Arabia in 1981, when he was a teenager. His soccer profession was discovered by Medina's soccer club, Al-Ansar and he officially played for Al-Ansar in the year 2000.

=== Al-Ahli 2004–2012 ===
Al-Ahli management offered Mouath 700,000 US$ to move play for Al-Ahli. The new team changed Mouath's position from a midfielder to a striker, this step was the key of success and fame of the player. He was the greatest player Saudi Arabia of all time in 2006–2007, he also obtaining the Saudi Crown Prince Cup and Saudi Federation Cup in 2007 against Al-Ittihad. On 20 May 2008 Malek played Al-Nasr for farewell match by legendary Majed Abdullah against Real Madrid C.F., Malek scored 2 goals in 54 minutes and 90+1 minutes and they team won scores are 4–1. On 2 September 2011 he move to Al-Nasr Club as loan for one season only.

=== Al-Nasr (loan) 2011–2012 ===
On the 2011–12 Saudi Professional League, Malek has played 16 appearances and made 3 goals. after the end of tournament with Al-Nasr, Al-Ahli thinking about it if he need him or not in the next season, Al-Ahli decided to release his contract to promised dues. Mouath said I Will not be move to a weak team and I'm thinking the UAE Pro-League or retire. on 2012, Mouath announced to retire.

== International career ==
Malek joined the Saudi national team in early 2006. During 2006 FIFA World Cup, Mouath used 23 as a squad number. Later, when Sami Al-Jaber, the former Saudi Arabia striker retired, the manager changed Mouath's number from 23 to 9.

He was chosen for the Saudi squad in 2006 FIFA World Cup and 2007 AFC Asian Cup. He was announced as the best player of the 2006/2007 season by Saudi Arabian Football Federation (SAFF).

During the 2007 AFC Asian Cup he helped Saudi Arabia progress to the final by scoring 2 goals in the semi-final against Japan. The final was subsequently lost to Iraq.

=== International goals ===
#	Date	Venue	Opponent	Score	Result	Competition
1	4 May 2006		Togo	1–0	Won	Friendly match
2	21 January 2007	Al-Nahyan Stadium, Abu Dhabi	Qatar	1–1	Draw	18th Arabian Gulf Cup
3	24 June 2007	Al-Nahyan Stadium, Abu Dhabi	United Arab Emirates	2–0	Won	Friendly match
4	7 July 2007		South Korea	1–1	Draw	Friendly match
5	25 July 2007	Mỹ Đình National Stadium, Hanoi	Japan	3–2	Won	2007 AFC Asian Cup
6	25 July 2007	Mỹ Đình National Stadium, Hanoi	Japan	3–2	Won	2007 AFC Asian Cup
7	27 May 2008	Riyadh, Saudi Arabia	Kuwait	2–1	Won	Friendly match
8	2 June 2008	King Fahd International Stadium, Riyadh	Lebanon	4–1	Won	2010 FIFA World Cup qualification (AFC)
9	22 June 2008	Jeddah, Saudi Arabia	Uzbekistan	4–0	Won	2010 FIFA World Cup qualification (AFC)
10	22 June 2008	Jeddah, Saudi Arabia	Uzbekistan	4–0	Won	2010 FIFA World Cup qualification (AFC)
11	8 January 2009	Royal Oman Police Stadium, Muscat	Yemen	6–0	Won	19th Arabian Gulf Cup
12	8 January 2009	Royal Oman Police Stadium, Muscat	Yemen	6–0	Won	19th Arabian Gulf Cup
13	4 June 2009		China	4–1	Won	Friendly match
14	4 June 2009		China	4–1	Won	Friendly match
15	30 August 2009	Jeddah, Saudi Arabia	Malaysia	2–1	Won	Friendly match

== Honours ==
=== Al-Ahli (Jeddah) ===
- Crown Prince Cup : 2007
- Saudi Federation Cup : 2007
- Gulf Club Champions Cup: 2008

=== National team ===
- 2006 FIFA World Cup: Group Stage
- 2007 AFC Asian Cup: Runner up
- 18th Arabian Gulf Cup: semi-finals
- 19th Arabian Gulf Cup: Runner up

=== Individual ===
- Best Player In Saudi Premier League: 2006–07
