= Redha Tukar =

Saudi Arabian footballer

Personal information
- Full name: Redha Hassan Tukar Fallatha
- Date of birth: 29 November 1975 (age 50)
- Place of birth: Medina, Saudi Arabia
- Height: 1.88 m (6 ft 2 in)
- Position: Central defender

Senior career*
Years	Team	Apps	(Gls)
1993–2001	Ohud		
2001–2003	Al-Shabab		
2003–2013	Al-Ittihad	233	(18)

International career^{‡}
2001–2009	Saudi Arabia	98	(11)
- * Club domestic league appearances and goals as of 2 July 2009 ‡ National team caps and goals as of 2 July 2009

Redha Hassan Tukar Fallatha (Arabic: رضا حسن تُكر فلاتة; born 29 November 1975 in Medina) is a Saudi Arabian former footballer who played as a defender for Al Ittihad.

Tukar started his career at second division with Ohod before joining Al-Shabab, with whom he won the 2000–01 Asian Cup Winners' Cup. He subsequently moved to Al Ittihad and was part of the 2005 AFC Champions League winners.

He was also a member of the Saudi Arabia national team and was called up to the squad to participate in the 2006 FIFA World Cup. He also participated in the 2002 FIFA World Cup.

== Honours ==
- with Al-Iittihad
  - Saudi Premier League (2): 2006–07, 2008–09
  - Kings Cup (2): 2010, 2013
  - Crown Prince Cup (1): 2004
  - AFC Champions League (2): 2004, 2005
  - Arab Champions League (1): 2004–05
