= 2009 AFC Champions League group stage =

Football tournament group stage

The 2009 AFC Champions League group stage was played from 10 March to 20 May 2009. A total of 32 teams competed in the group stage to decide the 16 places in the knock-out stage of the 2009 AFC Champions League.

== Groups ==
=== Group A ===
| Pos | Team | Pld | W | D | L | GF | GA | GD | Pts | Qualification |
|---|---|---|---|---|---|---|---|---|---|---|
| 1 | (Saudi Arabia) Al-Hilal | 6 | 4 | 2 | 0 | 10 | 4 | +6 | 14 | Advance to knockout stage |
| 2 | (Uzbekistan) Pakhtakor | 6 | 4 | 1 | 1 | 9 | 5 | +4 | 13 | Advance to knockout stage |
| 3 | (Iran) Saba Qom | 6 | 1 | 2 | 3 | 7 | 9 | −2 | 5 | |
| 4 | (United Arab Emirates) Al-Ahli | 6 | 0 | 1 | 5 | 6 | 14 | −8 | 1 | |

Source: WorldFootball.net
10 March 2009
19:15 (UTC+4)

| Al-Ahli (United Arab Emirates) | 1–2 | (Uzbekistan) Pakhtakor |
|---|---|---|
| Abd Rabo 89' | Report | Ahmedov 25'; Z. Tadjiyev 67' |

Al-Rashid Stadium, Dubai
Attendance: 2,551
Referee: Abdullah Al-Hilali (Oman)
11 March 2009
18:40 (UTC+3)

| Al-Hilal (Saudi Arabia) | 1–1 | (Iran) Qom |
|---|---|---|
| Hawsawi 33' | Report | Hamid Reza Farzaneh 14' |

King Fahd Stadium, Riyadh
Attendance: 19,000
Referee: Subkhiddin Mohd Salleh (Malaysia)

17 March 2009
15:00 (UTC+3:30)

| Qom (Iran) | 0–0 | (United Arab Emirates) Al-Ahli |
|---|---|---|
| | Report |

Yadegar Emam Stadium, Qom
Attendance: 9,000
Referee: Minoru Tojo (Japan)
17 March 2009
17:00 (UTC+5)

| Pakhtakor (Uzbekistan) | 1–1 | (Saudi Arabia) Al-Hilal |
|---|---|---|
| Z. Tadjiyev 57' | Report | Rădoi 55' (pen.) |

Pakhtakor Markaziy Stadium, Tashkent
Attendance: 10,454
Referee: Sun Baojie (China)

7 April 2009
16:00 (UTC+4:30)

| Qom (Iran) | 0–2 | (Uzbekistan) Pakhtakor |
|---|---|---|
| | Report | Z. Tadjiyev 56'; F. Tadjiyev 64' |

Yadegar Emam Stadium, Qom
Attendance: 3,645
Referee: Abdulrahman Abdou (Qatar)
7 April 2009
20:35 (UTC+3)

| Al-Hilal (Saudi Arabia) | 2–1 | (United Arab Emirates) Al-Ahli |
|---|---|---|
| Al-Qahtani 32'; Rădoi 90+3' (pen.) | Report | A. Khalil 12' |

King Fahd Stadium, Riyadh
Attendance: 11,000
Referee: Mohsen Basma (Syria)

22 April 2009
17:30 (UTC+5)

| Pakhtakor (Uzbekistan) | 2–1 | (Iran) Qom |
|---|---|---|
| Ahmedov 36' (pen.); Andreev 49' | Report | Nouri 5' |

Pakhtakor Markaziy Stadium, Tashkent
Attendance: 17,000
Referee: Peter Green (Australia)
22 April 2009
19:35 (UTC+4)

| Al-Ahli (United Arab Emirates) | 1–3 | (Saudi Arabia) Al-Hilal |
|---|---|---|
| Abd Rabo 3' | Report | Al Taib 32'; Rădoi 53'; Al-Qahtani 64' |

Al-Rashid Stadium, Dubai
Attendance: 4,500
Referee: Masaaki Toma (Japan)

6 May 2009
16:30 (UTC+4:30)

| Qom (Iran) | 0–1 | (Saudi Arabia) Al-Hilal |
|---|---|---|
| | Report | El Taib 42' |

Yadegar Emam Stadium, Qom
Attendance: 900
Referee: Tan Hai (China)
6 May 2009
18:30 (UTC+5)

| Pakhtakor (Uzbekistan) | 2–0 | (United Arab Emirates) Al-Ahli |
|---|---|---|
| Z. Tadjiyev 38'; Geynrikh 58' | Report |

Pakhtakor Markaziy Stadium, Tashkent
Attendance: 12,000
Referee: Abdul Malik Bashir (Singapore)

20 May 2009
20:50 (UTC+3)

| Al-Hilal (Saudi Arabia) | 2–0 | (Uzbekistan) Pakhtakor |
|---|---|---|
| Al-Anbar 37'; Al-Swaileh 64' | Report |

King Fahd Stadium, Riyadh
Attendance: 11,251
Referee: Kim Dong-Jin (Korea Republic)
20 May 2009
19:50 (UTC+4)

| Al-Ahli (United Arab Emirates) | 3–5 | (Iran) Qom |
|---|---|---|
| Khamis 31' (pen.); Al-Hawasin 45' (pen.); Meydavoudi 66' | Report | Fazli 68'; Shafiei 74'; Nouri 75'; Yousefi 82'; Hamrang 87' |

Al-Rashid Stadium, Dubai
Attendance: 326
Referee: Abdulrahman Abdou (Qatar)

=== Group B ===
| Pos | Team | Pld | W | D | L | GF | GA | GD | Pts | Qualification |
|---|---|---|---|---|---|---|---|---|---|---|
| 1 | (Iran) Persepolis | 4 | 2 | 1 | 1 | 5 | 6 | −1 | 7 | Advance to knockout stage |
| 2 | (Saudi Arabia) Al-Shabab | 4 | 2 | 1 | 1 | 4 | 2 | +2 | 7 | Advance to knockout stage |
| 3 | (Qatar) Al-Gharafa | 4 | 1 | 0 | 3 | 7 | 8 | −1 | 3 | |
| 4 | (United Arab Emirates) Sharjah (Note: Sharjah were found guilty of fielding an ineligible player Abdelaziz Mohamed Al Mazam during the team’s AFC Champions League match against Al Shabab of Saudi Arabia on 8.4.09. Thus, Al Sharjah were fined USD 4000 and the match was awarded to Al Shabab 3-0.) | 0 | 0 | 0 | 0 | 0 | 0 | 0 | 0 | Withdrew (Note: Sharjah withdrew from the competition with two games remaining. Their results were expunged.) |

Source: WorldFootball.net
Notes:
10 March 2009
15:00 (UTC+3:30)

| Persepolis (Iran) | Annulled 3–1 | (United Arab Emirates) Sharjah |
|---|---|---|
| Karimi 28'; Nikbakht 31'; Norouzi 34' | Report | Abdulwahab 55' |

Azadi Stadium, Tehran
Attendance: 55,000
Referee: Valentin Kovalenko (Uzbekistan)
10 March 2009
18:15 (UTC+3)

| Al-Gharafa (Qatar) | 1–3 | (Saudi Arabia) Al-Shabab |
|---|---|---|
| Araújo 40' | Report | Marcelo Camacho 5'; Bin Saran 23'; Al-Shamrani 44' |

Al-Gharafa Stadium, Doha
Attendance: 500
Referee: Ravshan Irmatov (Uzbekistan)

17 March 2009
20:30 (UTC+3)

| Al-Shabab (Saudi Arabia) | 0–0 | (Iran) Persepolis |
|---|---|---|
| | Report |

King Fahd Stadium, Riyadh
Attendance: 9,000
Referee: Choi Myung-Yong (Korea Republic)
17 March 2009
19:15 (UTC+4)

| Sharjah (United Arab Emirates) | Annulled (0–2) | (Qatar) Al-Gharafa |
|---|---|---|
| | Report | Kamil 16'; Araújo 53' |

Sharjah Stadium, Sharjah
Attendance: 2,000
Referee: Hiroyoshi Takayama (Japan)

8 April 2009
19:20 (UTC+4)

| Sharjah (United Arab Emirates) | Annulled (1–3) | (Saudi Arabia) Al-Shabab |
|---|---|---|
| Anderson Barbosa 12' | Report | Al-Shamrani 21' (pen.); Otaif 42'; Marcelo Camacho 49' |

Sharjah Stadium, Sharjah
Attendance: 1,000
Referee: Tan Hai (China)
8 April 2009
16:00 (UTC+4:30)

| Persepolis (Iran) | 3–1 | (Qatar) Al-Gharafa |
|---|---|---|
| Zare 36' (pen.); Touré 45+1'; Nikbakht 47' | Report | Fernandão 69' |

Azadi Stadium, Tehran
Attendance: 53,204
Referee: Matthew Breeze (Australia)

21 April 2009
20:40 (UTC+3)

| Al-Shabab (Saudi Arabia) | Annulled (5–0) | (United Arab Emirates) Sharjah |
|---|---|---|
| Bin Saran 16', 64'; Al-Shamrani 42' (pen.), 47', 58' | Report |

King Fahd Stadium, Riyadh
Attendance: 2,950
Referee: Kim Dong-Jin (Korea Republic)
21 April 2009
18:30 (UTC+3)

| Al-Gharafa (Qatar) | 5–1 | (Iran) Persepolis |
|---|---|---|
| Fernandão 8'; Araújo 43', 45+1', 81'; Nashat Akram 69' | Report | Karimi 76' |

Al-Gharafa Stadium, Doha
Attendance: 1,000
Referee: Yuichi Nishimura (Japan)

6 May 2009
19:30 (UTC+4)

| Sharjah (United Arab Emirates) | Cancelled | (Iran) Persepolis |

Sharjah Stadium, Sharjah
6 May 2009
20:45 (UTC+3)

| Al-Shabab (Saudi Arabia) | 1–0 | (Qatar) Al-Gharafa |
|---|---|---|
| Al-Shamrani 90+2' (pen.) | Report |

King Fahd Stadium, Riyadh
Attendance: 5,000
Referee: Sun Baojie (China)

20 May 2009
17:00 (UTC+4:30)

| Persepolis (Iran) | 1–0 | (Saudi Arabia) Al-Shabab |
|---|---|---|
| Khalili 46' | Report |

Azadi Stadium, Tehran
Attendance: 31,321
Referee: Minoru Tojo (Japan)
20 May 2009
18:45 (UTC+3)

| Al-Gharafa (Qatar) | Cancelled | (United Arab Emirates) Sharjah |

Al-Gharafa Stadium, Doha

=== Group C ===
| Pos | Team | Pld | W | D | L | GF | GA | GD | Pts | Qualification |
|---|---|---|---|---|---|---|---|---|---|---|
| 1 | (Saudi Arabia) Al-Ittihad | 6 | 3 | 3 | 0 | 14 | 4 | +10 | 12 | Advance to knockout stage |
| 2 | (Qatar) Umm-Salal | 6 | 2 | 2 | 2 | 6 | 13 | −7 | 8 | Advance to knockout stage |
| 3 | (United Arab Emirates) Al-Jazira | 6 | 0 | 5 | 1 | 6 | 7 | −1 | 5 | |
| 4 | (Iran) Esteghlal | 6 | 0 | 4 | 2 | 6 | 8 | −2 | 4 | |

Source: WorldFootball.net
11 March 2009
17:30 (UTC+4)

| Al-Jazira (United Arab Emirates) | 0–1 | (Qatar) Umm-Salal |
|---|---|---|
| | Report | Hubail 90+2' |

Al Jazira Mohammed Bin Zayed Stadium, Dubai
Attendance: 6,920
Referee: Yuichi Nishimura (Japan)
11 March 2009
20:30 (UTC+3)

| Al-Ittihad (Saudi Arabia) | 2–1 | (Iran) Esteghlal |
|---|---|---|
| Moteab 89'; Aboucherouane 90+3' | Report | Borhani 77' |

Prince Abdullah al-Faisal Stadium, Jeddah
Attendance: 19,000
Referee: Masaaki Iemoto (Japan)

18 March 2009
15:00 (UTC+3:30)

| Esteghlal (Iran) | 1–1 | (United Arab Emirates) Al-Jazira |
|---|---|---|
| Kazemi 45+4' | Report | Fernando Baiano 10' |

Azadi Stadium, Tehran
Attendance: 40,000
Referee: Ravshan Irmatov (Uzbekistan)
18 March 2009
18:00 (UTC+3)

| Umm-Salal (Qatar) | 1–3 | (Saudi Arabia) Al-Ittihad |
|---|---|---|
| N'Diaye 29' | Report | Al-Montashari 42'; Renato 56'; Aboucherouane 61' |

Qatar SC Stadium, Doha
Attendance: 2,000
Referee: Tan Hai (China)

7 April 2009
19:00 (UTC+3)

| Umm-Salal (Qatar) | 1–0 | (Iran) Esteghlal |
|---|---|---|
| Fábio César 67' | Report |

Qatar SC Stadium, Doha
Attendance: 2,000
Referee: Abdul Malik Bashir (Singapore)
7 April 2009
19:00 (UTC+4)

| Al-Jazira (United Arab Emirates) | 0–0 | (Saudi Arabia) Al-Ittihad |
|---|---|---|
| | Report |

Al Jazira Mohammed Bin Zayed Stadium, Dubai
Attendance: 11,830
Referee: Ben Williams (Australia)

22 April 2009
16:00 (UTC+4:30)

| Esteghlal (Iran) | 1–1 | (Qatar) Umm-Salal |
|---|---|---|
| Borhani 45' | Report | Ghanem 70' |

Azadi Stadium, Tehran
Attendance: 27,165
Referee: Abdullah Al-Hilali (Oman)
22 April 2009
20:40 (UTC+3)

| Al-Ittihad (Saudi Arabia) | 1–1 | (United Arab Emirates) Al-Jazira |
|---|---|---|
| Al-Muwallad 40' | Report | Fernando Baiano 71' |

Prince Abdullah al-Faisal Stadium, Jeddah
Attendance: 23,000
Referee: Subkhiddin Mohd Salleh (Malaysia)

5 May 2009
17:00 (UTC+4:30)

| Esteghlal (Iran) | 1–1 | (Saudi Arabia) Al-Ittihad |
|---|---|---|
| Alizadeh 89' | Report | Aboucherouane 80' |

Azadi Stadium, Tehran
Attendance: 15,855
Referee: Mohsen Basma (Syria)
5 May 2009
19:00 (UTC+3)

| Umm-Salal (Qatar) | 2–2 | (United Arab Emirates) Al-Jazira |
|---|---|---|
| Hubail 54', 65' | Report | Khater 22'; Fernando Baiano 29' |

Qatar SC Stadium, Doha
Attendance: 2,000
Referee: Kim Dong-Jin (Korea Republic)

19 May 2009
20:50 (UTC+3)

| Al-Ittihad (Saudi Arabia) | 7–0 | (Qatar) Umm-Salal |
|---|---|---|
| Renato 8', 85'; Hazazi 17', 25', 52'; Al-Saqri 56'; Al-Meshal 77' | Report |

Prince Abdullah al-Faisal Stadium, Jeddah
Attendance: 7,594
Referee: Ravshan Irmatov (Uzbekistan)
19 May 2009
20:30 (UTC+4)

| Al-Jazira (United Arab Emirates) | 2–2 | (Iran) Esteghlal |
|---|---|---|
| Mabkhout 49'; Saad 70' | Report | Alizadeh 79'; Shakouri 84' |

Al Jazira Mohammed Bin Zayed Stadium, Dubai
Attendance: 1,600
Referee: Sun Baojie (China)

=== Group D ===
| Pos | Team | Pld | W | D | L | GF | GA | GD | Pts | Qualification |
|---|---|---|---|---|---|---|---|---|---|---|
| 1 | (Saudi Arabia) Al-Ettifaq | 6 | 4 | 0 | 2 | 15 | 8 | +7 | 12 | Advance to knockout stage |
| 2 | (Uzbekistan) Bunyodkor | 6 | 2 | 2 | 2 | 5 | 9 | −4 | 8 | Advance to knockout stage |
| 3 | (Iran) Sepahan | 6 | 2 | 1 | 3 | 9 | 7 | +2 | 7 | |
| 4 | (United Arab Emirates) Al-Shabab | 6 | 2 | 1 | 3 | 6 | 11 | −5 | 7 | |

Source: WorldFootball.net
11 March 2009
15:30 (UTC+3:30)

| Sepahan (Iran) | 2–0 | (United Arab Emirates) Al-Shabab Al-Arabi |
|---|---|---|
| Jafarpour 2'; Sá 90+3' | Report |

Foolad Shahr Stadium, Esfahan
Attendance: 15,000
Referee: Abdul Malik Bashir (Singapore)
11 March 2009
17:00 (UTC+5)

| Bunyodkor (Uzbekistan) | 2–1 | (Saudi Arabia) Al-Ettifaq |
|---|---|---|
| Soliev 27', 48' | Report | Bashir 68' |

JAR Stadium, Tashkent
Attendance: 9,120
Referee: Peter Green (Australia)

18 March 2009
20:30 (UTC+4)

| Al-Shabab Al-Arabi (United Arab Emirates) | 2–0 | (Uzbekistan) Bunyodkor |
|---|---|---|
| Obaid 3'; Mguni 39' | Report |

Al-Maktoum Stadium, Dubai
Attendance: 4,500
Referee: Mohsen Basma (Syria)
18 March 2009
20:00 (UTC+3)

| Al-Ettifaq (Saudi Arabia) | 2–1 | (Iran) Sepahan |
|---|---|---|
| Al-Qahtani 64'; Al-Hamed 86' | Report | Khatibi 45+2' |

Prince Mohamed bin Fahd Stadium, Dammam
Attendance: 7,000
Referee: Kim Dong-Jin (Korea Republic)

8 April 2009
18:00 (UTC+5)

| Bunyodkor (Uzbekistan) | 2–2 | (Iran) Sepahan |
|---|---|---|
| Salomov 27'; Ashurmatov 74' | Report | Aghili 45+2'; Emad Mohammed 60' |

JAR Stadium, Tashkent
Attendance: 9,000
Referee: Minoru Tojo (Japan)
8 April 2009
20:00 (UTC+3)

| Al-Ettifaq (Saudi Arabia) | 4–1 | (United Arab Emirates) Al-Shabab Al-Arabi |
|---|---|---|
| Tagoe 7', 82'; Bashir 16', 67' | Report | Abdullah 45+3' |

Prince Mohamed bin Fahd Stadium, Dammam
Attendance: 12,000
Referee: Masaaki Toma (Japan)

21 April 2009
16:00 (UTC+4:30)

| Sepahan (Iran) | 0–1 | (Uzbekistan) Bunyodkor |
|---|---|---|
| | Report | Kapadze 19' |

Foolad Shahr Stadium, Esfahan
Attendance: 10,000
Referee: Sun Baojie (China)
21 April 2009
19:30 (UTC+4)

| Al-Shabab Al-Arabi (United Arab Emirates) | 1–4 | (Saudi Arabia) Al-Ettifaq |
|---|---|---|
| Marcos Assunção 15' (pen.) | Report | Tagoe 30', 54', 84'; Al-Qahtani 90+4' |

Al-Maktoum Stadium, Dubai
Attendance: 1,500
Referee: Abdullah Balideh (Qatar)

5 May 2009
20:30 (UTC+4)

| Al-Shabab Al-Arabi (United Arab Emirates) | 2–1 | (Iran) Sepahan |
|---|---|---|
| Mguni 1'; Saad 51' | Report | Emad Mohammed 70' |

Al-Maktoum Stadium, Dubai
Attendance: 720
Referee: Matthew Breeze (Australia)
5 May 2009
20:00 (UTC+3)

| Al-Ettifaq (Saudi Arabia) | 4–0 | (Uzbekistan) Bunyodkor |
|---|---|---|
| Tagoe 16', 38'; Bashir 48'; Al Raja 81' | Report |

Prince Mohamed bin Fahd Stadium, Dammam
Attendance: 8,000
Referee: Ben Williams (Australia)

19 May 2009
17:00 (UTC+4:30)

| Sepahan (Iran) | 3–0 | (Saudi Arabia) Al-Ettifaq |
|---|---|---|
| Papi 2'; Asghari 52'; Azizzadeh 81' | Report |

Foolad Shahr Stadium, Esfahan
Attendance: 400
Referee: Yuichi Nishimura (Japan)
19 May 2009
19:00 (UTC+5)

| Bunyodkor (Uzbekistan) | 0–0 | (United Arab Emirates) Al-Shabab Al-Arabi |
|---|---|---|
| | Report |

JAR Stadium, Tashkent
Attendance: 8,500
Referee: Abdullah Al-Hilali (Oman)

=== Group E ===
| Pos | Team | Pld | W | D | L | GF | GA | GD | Pts | Qualification |
|---|---|---|---|---|---|---|---|---|---|---|
| 1 | (Japan) Nagoya Grampus | 6 | 3 | 3 | 0 | 10 | 4 | +6 | 12 | Advance to knockout stage |
| 2 | (Australia) Newcastle Jets | 6 | 3 | 1 | 2 | 6 | 5 | +1 | 10 | Advance to knockout stage |
| 3 | (South Korea) Ulsan Hyundai Horang-i | 6 | 2 | 0 | 4 | 4 | 10 | −6 | 6 | |
| 4 | (China) Beijing Guoan | 6 | 1 | 2 | 3 | 4 | 5 | −1 | 5 | |

Source: WorldFootball.net
10 March 2009
19:30 (UTC+9)

| Ulsan Hyundai Horang-i (South Korea) | 1–3 | (Japan) Nagoya Grampus |
|---|---|---|
| Cho Jin-Soo 25' | Report | Yoshida 54'; Davi 77'; Magnum 87' |

Munsu Cup Stadium, Ulsan
Attendance: 3,156
Referee: Chaiya Mahapab (Thailand)
10 March 2009
20:00 (UTC+8)

| Beijing Guoan (China) | 2–0 | (Australia) Newcastle United Jets |
|---|---|---|
| R. Griffiths 7'; Du Wenhui 90+3' | Report |

Workers Stadium, Beijing
Attendance: 31,000
Referee: Mohsen Basma (Syria)

17 March 2009
19:00 (UTC+9)

| Nagoya Grampus (Japan) | 0–0 | (China) Beijing Guoan |
|---|---|---|
| | Report |

Mizuho Athletic Stadium, Nagoya
Attendance: 7,374
Referee: Tayeb Hasan Shamsuzzaman (Bangladesh)
17 March 2009
20:00 (UTC+10)

| Newcastle United Jets (Australia) | 2–0 | (South Korea) Ulsan Hyundai Horang-i |
|---|---|---|
| Petrovski 15', 43' | Report |

EnergyAustralia Stadium, Newcastle
Attendance: 7,314
Referee: Masoud Moradi (Iran)

7 April 2009
19:00 (UTC+9)

| Nagoya Grampus (Japan) | 1–1 | (Australia) Newcastle United Jets |
|---|---|---|
| Tamada 65' | Report | Elrich 9' |

Mizuho Athletic Stadium, Nagoya
Attendance: 7,198
Referee: Khalil Al-Ghamdi (Saudi Arabia)
7 April 2009
19:00 (UTC+9)

| Ulsan Hyundai Horang-i (South Korea) | 1–0 | (China) Beijing Guoan |
|---|---|---|
| Oh Jang-Eun 69' | Report |

Munsu Cup Stadium, Ulsan
Attendance: 1,389
Referee: Fareed Al-Marzouqi (UAE)

22 April 2009
20:00 (UTC+10)

| Newcastle United Jets (Australia) | 0–1 | (Japan) Nagoya Grampus |
|---|---|---|
| | Report | Ogawa 57' |

EnergyAustralia Stadium, Newcastle
Attendance: 8,492
Referee: Ali Al-Badwawi (UAE)
22 April 2009
20:00 (UTC+8)

| Beijing Guoan (China) | 0–1 | (South Korea) Ulsan Hyundai Horang-i |
|---|---|---|
| | Report | Oh Jang-Eun 73' |

Workers Stadium, Beijing
Attendance: 32,465
Referee: Khalil Al-Ghamdi (Saudi Arabia)

6 May 2009
15:00 (UTC+9)

| Nagoya Grampus (Japan) | 4–1 | (South Korea) Ulsan Hyundai Horang-i |
|---|---|---|
| Ogawa 14', 72'; Maki 23'; Davi 59' | Report | Kim Shin-Wook 42' |

Mizuho Athletic Stadium, Nagoya
Attendance: 9,049
Referee: Subkhiddin Mohd Salleh (Malaysia)
6 May 2009
20:00 (UTC+10)

| Newcastle United Jets (Australia) | 2–1 | (China) Beijing Guoan |
|---|---|---|
| Petrovski 88'; Rooney 90+4' | Report | R. Griffiths 69' |

EnergyAustralia Stadium, Newcastle
Attendance: 6,106
Referee: Abdulrahman Abdou (Qatar)

20 May 2009
19:00 (UTC+8)

| Beijing Guoan (China) | 1–1 | (Japan) Nagoya Grampus |
|---|---|---|
| Guo Hui 81' | Report | Niikawa 35' |

Workers Stadium, Beijing
Attendance: 14,080
Referee: Mohsen Torky (Iran)
20 May 2009
19:30 (UTC+9)

| Ulsan Hyundai Horang-i (South Korea) | 0–1 | (Australia) Newcastle United Jets |
|---|---|---|
| | Report | Hoffman 36' |

Munsu Cup Stadium, Ulsan
Attendance: 2,000
Referee: Abdul Malik Bashir (Singapore)

=== Group F ===
| Pos | Team | Pld | W | D | L | GF | GA | GD | Pts | Qualification |
|---|---|---|---|---|---|---|---|---|---|---|
| 1 | (Japan) Gamba Osaka | 6 | 5 | 0 | 1 | 17 | 4 | +13 | 15 | Advance to knockout stage |
| 2 | (South Korea) FC Seoul | 6 | 3 | 1 | 2 | 14 | 11 | +3 | 10 | Advance to knockout stage |
| 3 | (China) Shandong Luneng | 6 | 2 | 1 | 3 | 10 | 9 | +1 | 7 | |
| 4 | (Indonesia) Sriwijaya | 6 | 1 | 0 | 5 | 7 | 24 | −17 | 3 | |

Source: WorldFootball.net
10 March 2009
19:00 (UTC+9)

| Gamba Osaka (Japan) | 3–0 | (China) Shandong Luneng |
|---|---|---|
| Leandro 20'; Endo 72' (pen.); Sasaki 79' | Report |

Osaka Expo '70 Stadium, Suita
Attendance: 10,312
Referee: Mohamed Al-Saeedi (UAE)
10 March 2009
19:00 (UTC+7)

| Sriwijaya (Indonesia) | 2–4 | (South Korea) FC Seoul |
|---|---|---|
| Ngon 70', 74' | Report | Jung Jo-Gook 32'; Kim Chi-Woo 57', 68'; Kim Seung-Yong 78' |

Jakabaring Stadium, Palembang
Attendance: 20,000
Referee: Fareed Al-Marzouqi (UAE)

17 March 2009
20:00 (UTC+9)

| FC Seoul (South Korea) | 2–4 | (Japan) Gamba Osaka |
|---|---|---|
| Jung Jo-Gook 53'; Lee Sang-Hyup 90+3' | Report | Yamazaki 13'; Leandro 61', 74', 83' |

Seoul World Cup Stadium, Seoul
Attendance: 11,197
Referee: Valentin Kovalenko (Uzbekistan)
17 March 2009
15:30 (UTC+8)

| Shandong Luneng (China) | 5–0 | (Indonesia) Sriwijaya |
|---|---|---|
| Li Jinyu 16', 26'; Han Peng 20'; Mrdaković 80', 84' | Report |

Shandong Provincial Stadium, Jinan
Attendance: 8,347
Referee: Ben Williams (Australia)

8 April 2009
19:00 (UTC+9)

| Gamba Osaka (Japan) | 5–0 | (Indonesia) Sriwijaya |
|---|---|---|
| Leandro 40', 44'; Ammar 49' (o.g.); Yamaguchi 51'; M. Yasuda 67' | Report |

Osaka Expo '70 Stadium, Suita
Attendance: 10,249
Referee: Masoud Moradi (Iran)
8 April 2009
15:30 (UTC+8)

| Shandong Luneng (China) | 2–0 | (South Korea) FC Seoul |
|---|---|---|
| Lü Zheng 54'; Han Peng 72' | Report |

Shandong Provincial Stadium, Jinan
Attendance: 13,586
Referee: Mohsen Torky (Iran)

21 April 2009
19:00 (UTC+7)

| Sriwijaya (Indonesia) | 0–3 | (Japan) Gamba Osaka |
|---|---|---|
| | Report | Leandro 30'; Sasaki 45'; Cho Jae-Jin 75' |

Jakabaring Stadium, Palembang
Attendance: 9,000
Referee: Abdul Malik Bashir (Singapore)
21 April 2009
19:00 (UTC+9)

| FC Seoul (South Korea) | 1–1 | (China) Shandong Luneng |
|---|---|---|
| Park Yong-Ho 24' | Report | Cichero 79' |

Seoul World Cup Stadium, Seoul
Attendance: 5,471
Referee: Tayeb Hasan Shamsuzzaman (Bangladesh)

5 May 2009
17:00 (UTC+9)

| FC Seoul (South Korea) | 5–1 | (Indonesia) Sriwijaya |
|---|---|---|
| Damjanović 17', 72', 90+2'; Sim Woo-Yeon 75', 79' | Report | Gumbs 62' |

Seoul World Cup Stadium, Seoul
Attendance: 15,295
Referee: Ali Al-Badwawi (UAE)
6 May 2009
19:30 (UTC+8)

| Shandong Luneng (China) | 0–1 | (Japan) Gamba Osaka |
|---|---|---|
| | Report | Leandro 59' |

Shandong Provincial Stadium, Jinan
Attendance: 20,132
Referee: Khalil Al-Ghamdi (Saudi Arabia)

20 May 2009
19:00 (UTC+9)

| Gamba Osaka (Japan) | 1–2 | (South Korea) FC Seoul |
|---|---|---|
| Usami 64' | Report | Damjanović 74'; Kim Han-Yoon 90+1' |

Osaka Expo '70 Stadium, Suita
Attendance: 6,861
Referee: Matthew Breeze (Australia)
20 May 2009
20:00 (UTC+7)

| Sriwijaya (Indonesia) | 4–2 | (China) Shandong Luneng |
|---|---|---|
| Gumbs 53'; Krangar 73', 80'; Nasuha 87' | Report | Han Peng 42'; Gao Di 43' |

Jakabaring Stadium, Palembang
Attendance: 5,300
Referee: Masoud Moradi (Iran)

=== Group G ===
| Pos | Team | Pld | W | D | L | GF | GA | GD | Pts | Qualification |
|---|---|---|---|---|---|---|---|---|---|---|
| 1 | (Japan) Kashima Antlers | 6 | 4 | 1 | 1 | 16 | 6 | +10 | 13 | Advance to knockout stage |
| 2 | (South Korea) Suwon Samsung Bluewings | 6 | 4 | 0 | 2 | 12 | 8 | +4 | 12 | Advance to knockout stage |
| 3 | (China) Shanghai Shenhua | 6 | 2 | 2 | 2 | 9 | 8 | +1 | 8 | |
| 4 | Singapore Armed Forces | 6 | 0 | 1 | 5 | 4 | 19 | −15 | 1 | |

Source: WorldFootball.net
11 March 2009
20:00 (UTC+9)

| Suwon Samsung Bluewings (South Korea) | 4–1 | (Japan) Kashima Antlers |
|---|---|---|
| Li Weifeng 44'; Edu 45+1'; Hong Soon-Hak 82'; Park Hyun-Beom 90+1' | Report | Marquinhos 90+2' |

Suwon World Cup Stadium, Suwon
Attendance: 14,126
Referee: Ali Al-Badwawi (UAE)
11 March 2009
20:00 (UTC+8)

| Shanghai Shenhua (China) | 4–1 | Singapore Armed Forces |
|---|---|---|
| Barcos 25' (pen.), 90+4'; Yu Tao 74'; Yin Xifu 85' | Report | Wilkinson 64' |

Hongkou Stadium, Shanghai
Attendance: 8,000
Referee: Matthew Breeze (Australia)

18 March 2009
19:00 (UTC+9)

| Kashima Antlers (Japan) | 2–0 | (China) Shanghai Shenhua |
|---|---|---|
| Nozawa 45'; Osako 80' | Report |

Kashima Soccer Stadium, Kashima
Attendance: 6,375
Referee: Subkhiddin Mohd Salleh (Malaysia)
18 March 2009
19:30 (UTC+8)

| Singapore Armed Forces | 0–2 | (South Korea) Suwon Samsung Bluewings |
|---|---|---|
| | Report | Edu 65' (pen.), 71' |

Jalan Besar Stadium, Singapore
Attendance: 3,867
Referee: Khalil Al-Ghamdi (Saudi Arabia)

7 April 2009
19:30 (UTC+8)

| Singapore Armed Forces | 1–4 | (Japan) Kashima Antlers |
|---|---|---|
| Osman 26' | Report | Motoyama 23'; Uchida 43'; Osako 47'; Aoki 90+3' |

Jalan Besar Stadium, Singapore
Attendance: 4,406
Referee: Tayeb Hasan Shamsuzzaman (Bangladesh)
7 April 2009
20:00 (UTC+8)

| Shanghai Shenhua (China) | 2–1 | (South Korea) Suwon Samsung Bluewings |
|---|---|---|
| Vâlkanov 18'; Hleb 76' | Report | Li Weifeng 65' |

Hongkou Stadium, Shanghai
Attendance: 20,000
Referee: Mohamed Al-Saeedi (UAE)

22 April 2009
19:00 (UTC+9)

| Kashima Antlers (Japan) | 5–0 | Singapore Armed Forces |
|---|---|---|
| Nozawa 29'; Koroki 38', 74'; Ogasawara 50'; Osako 54' | Report |

Kashima Soccer Stadium, Kashima
Attendance: 6,027
Referee: Ravshan Irmatov (Uzbekistan)
22 April 2009
19:00 (UTC+9)

| Suwon Samsung Bluewings (South Korea) | 2–1 | (China) Shanghai Shenhua |
|---|---|---|
| Lee Sang-ho 41'; Bae Ki-Jong 44' | Report | Vâlkanov 12' |

Suwon World Cup Stadium, Suwon
Attendance: 10,068
Referee: Mohsen Torky (Iran)

5 May 2009
15:00 (UTC+9)

| Kashima Antlers (Japan) | 3–0 | (South Korea) Suwon Samsung Bluewings |
|---|---|---|
| Oiwa 27'; Marquinhos 32', 75' | Report |

Kashima Soccer Stadium, Kashima
Attendance: 19,500
Referee: Abdullah Balideh (Qatar)
5 May 2009
19:30 (UTC+8)

| Singapore Armed Forces | 1–1 | (China) Shanghai Shenhua |
|---|---|---|
| Latiff 29' | Report | Barcos 90+1' |

Jalan Besar Stadium, Singapore
Attendance: 2,838
Referee: Fareed Al-Marzouqi (UAE)

19 May 2009
19:30 (UTC+9)

| Suwon Samsung Bluewings (South Korea) | 3–1 | Singapore Armed Forces |
|---|---|---|
| Bae Ki-Jong 5'; Lee Sang-ho 45+1'; Seo Dong-Hyun 90+2' (pen.) | Report | Đurić 42' |

Suwon World Cup Stadium, Suwon
Attendance: 9,148
Referee: Valentin Kovalenko (Uzbekistan)
19 May 2009
20:00 (UTC+8)

| Shanghai Shenhua (China) | 1–1 | (Japan) Kashima Antlers |
|---|---|---|
| Milligan 9' | Report | Marquinhos 31' |

Hongkou Stadium, Shanghai
Attendance: 15,000
Referee: Khalil Al-Ghamdi (Saudi Arabia)

=== Group H ===
| Pos | Team | Pld | W | D | L | GF | GA | GD | Pts | Qualification |
|---|---|---|---|---|---|---|---|---|---|---|
| 1 | (South Korea) Pohang Steelers | 6 | 3 | 3 | 0 | 7 | 3 | +4 | 12 | Advance to knockout stage |
| 2 | (Japan) Kawasaki Frontale | 6 | 3 | 1 | 2 | 10 | 7 | +3 | 10 | Advance to knockout stage |
| 3 | (China) Tianjin Teda | 6 | 2 | 2 | 2 | 6 | 5 | +1 | 8 | |
| 4 | (Australia) Central Coast Mariners | 6 | 0 | 2 | 4 | 5 | 13 | −8 | 2 | |

Source: WorldFootball.net
11 March 2009
20:00 (UTC+10)

| Central Coast Mariners (Australia) | 0–0 | (South Korea) Pohang Steelers |
|---|---|---|
| | Report |

Bluetongue Stadium, Gosford
Attendance: 6,870
Referee: Khalil Al-Ghamdi (Saudi Arabia)
11 March 2009
19:00 (UTC+9)

| Kawasaki Frontale (Japan) | 1–0 | (China) Tianjin Teda |
|---|---|---|
| Renatinho 16' | Report |

Todoroki Athletics Stadium, Kawasaki
Attendance: 12,125
Referee: Mohsen Torky (Iran)

18 March 2009
19:30 (UTC+9)

| Pohang Steelers (South Korea) | 1–1 | (Japan) Kawasaki Frontale |
|---|---|---|
| Kim Jae-Sung 12' | Report | Terada 24' |

Steelyard Stadium, Pohang
Attendance: 7,335
Referee: Abdullah Al-Hilali (Oman)
18 March 2009
20:00 (UTC+8)

| Tianjin Teda (China) | 2–2 | (Australia) Central Coast Mariners |
|---|---|---|
| Éber 37'; Wu Wei'an 66' | Report | Caceres 48'; Simon 61' |

TEDA Football Stadium, Tianjin
Attendance: 27,005
Referee: Abdul Malik Bashir (Singapore)

8 April 2009
20:00 (UTC+10)

| Central Coast Mariners (Australia) | 0–5 | (Japan) Kawasaki Frontale |
|---|---|---|
| | Report | Jong Tae-Se 8'; Taniguchi 22'; Juninho 37'; K. Nakamura 49'; Renatinho 70' |

Bluetongue Stadium, Gosford
Attendance: 9,419
Referee: Ravshan Irmatov (Uzbekistan)
8 April 2009
19:00 (UTC+9)

| Pohang Steelers (South Korea) | 1–0 | (China) Tianjin Teda |
|---|---|---|
| Hwang Jin-Sung 67' | Report |

Steelyard Stadium, Pohang
Attendance: 7,034
Referee: Valentin Kovalenko (Uzbekistan)

21 April 2009
19:00 (UTC+9)

| Kawasaki Frontale (Japan) | 2–1 | (Australia) Central Coast Mariners |
|---|---|---|
| Juninho 46'; Renatinho 81' | Report | Simon 59' |

Todoroki Athletics Stadium, Kawasaki
Attendance: 8,419
Referee: Fareed Al-Marzouqi (UAE)
21 April 2009
20:00 (UTC+8)

| Tianjin Teda (China) | 0–0 | (South Korea) Pohang Steelers |
|---|---|---|
| | Report |

TEDA Football Stadium, Tianjin
Attendance: 19,831
Referee: Mohamed Al-Saeedi (UAE)

5 May 2009
13:00 (UTC+9)

| Pohang Steelers (South Korea) | 3–2 | (Australia) Central Coast Mariners |
|---|---|---|
| Denilson 8', 71', 88' | Report | Kwasnik 54', 57' |

Steelyard Stadium, Pohang
Attendance: 11,539
Referee: Masoud Moradi (Iran)
5 May 2009
19:30 (UTC+8)

| Tianjin Teda (China) | 3–1 | (Japan) Kawasaki Frontale |
|---|---|---|
| Ma Leilei 12', 19'; Tommasi 90+4' | Report | Renatinho 51' |

TEDA Football Stadium, Tianjin
Attendance: 15,717
Referee: Tayeb Hasan Shamsuzzaman (Bangladesh)

19 May 2009
19:00 (UTC+9)

| Kawasaki Frontale (Japan) | 0–2 | (South Korea) Pohang Steelers |
|---|---|---|
| | Report | Noh Byung-Joon 12'; Denilson 72' |

Todoroki Athletics Stadium, Kawasaki
Attendance: 13,633
Referee: Abdullah Balideh (Qatar)
19 May 2009
20:00 (UTC+10)

| Central Coast Mariners (Australia) | 0–1 | (China) Tianjin Teda |
|---|---|---|
| | Report | Mao Biao 64' |

Bluetongue Stadium, Gosford
Attendance: 5,843
Referee: Mohsen Basma (Syria)
