= 2008–09 Saba Qom F.C. season =

Saba Qom
2008–09 season
- Chairman: Karim Malahi
- Manager: Firouz Karimi
- Iran Pro League: 6th
- AFC Champions League: in progress
- Hazfi Cup: in progress
- Top goalscorer: League: Fereydoon Fazli(14); All: Fereydoon Fazli(16)

This is a list of Saba Qom's results at the 2008–09 Persian Gulf Cup, 2008–09 Hazfi Cup and 2009 ACL. The club is competing in the Iran Pro League, Hazfi Cup and Asian Champions League.

== Iran Pro League ==
=== Schedule ===
Last updated 26 Apr 2009

#	Date	Home	Score	Away	Goal	Yellow card	Red card	Fans	Ref	Rank
1	2008-Aug-05	Saba	1-1	Paykan	Fereydoon Fazli (83)	-	-	6000	Alireza Faghani	9
2	2008-Aug-09	Aboomoslem	1-0	Saba	-	Morteza Asadi	-	3000	Ahmad Salehi	13
3	2008-Aug-18	Saba	2-2	Bargh	Gholamreza Rezai (5), Fereydoon Fazli (38)	Yahya Golmohamadi, Mohsen Yousefi	Gholamreza Rezai	4000	Hedayat Mombeini	14
4	2008-Aug-24	Sepahan	2-0	Saba	-	-	-	4000	Yadolah Jahanbazi	17
5	2008-Oct-17	Zob Ahan	2-2	Saba	Gholamreza Rezai (23), Mohsen Bayatinia (73)	Mohamad Hamrang, Adel Kolahkaj	-	2000	Alireza Faghani	17
6	2008-Sep-12	Saba	3-1	Esteghlal	Shays Rezai (39), Adel Kolahkaj (71), Fereydoon Fazli (90+3)	Mohamad Noori, Fereydoon Fazli, Elmir Tolja	-	15000	Khodadad Afsharian	12
7	2008-Sep-18	Moghavemat	1-1	Saba	Mehdi Khayri (90)	-	-	7000	Mohsen Ghahremani	13
8	2008-Sep-25	Saba	0-0	Payam Mashhad	-	Hamid Sarabadani, Adel Kolahkaj, Morteza Asadi	-	3000	Rahim Mehrpishe	13
9	2008-Oct-2	Pegah	1-2	Saba	Fereydoon Fazli (58) (68)	-	-	5000	Shahin Hajbabaei	11
10	2008-Oct-7	Saba	2-0	Esteghlal Ahvaz	Fereydoon Fazli (54), Shahin Shafiei (83)	Fereydoon Fazli, Mohamad Noori, Gholamreza Rezai	-	4000	Toraj Haghverdi	9
11	2008-Oct-21	Rah Ahan	1-1	Saba	Gholamreza Rezai (13)	-	-	1000	Mansour Nouri	9
12	2008-Nov-25	Malavan	1-1	Saba	Fereydoon Fazli (77) pen	-	-	5000	Ahmad Salehi	9
13	2008-Oct-30	Saba	1-1	Foolad	Fereydoon Fazli (31)	-	-	3000	Saeed Mozafari Zadeh	9
14	2008-Nov-06	Persepolis	2-2	Saba	Fereydoon Fazli (57) (74)	Fereydoon Fazli, Ershad Yousefi	-	40000	Rahim Rahimi Moghadam	9
15	2008-Nov-21	Saba	3-1	PAS Hamedan	Mehdi Khayri (16), Mohamad Noori (35), Fereydoon Fazli (85)	-	Amir Hossain Feshangchi	4000	Saeed Mozafari Zadeh	9
16	2008-Nov-29	Mes Kerman	3-1	Saba	Alireza Latifi (37)	Shays Rezai	-	4000	Rahim Mehrpishe	10
17	2008-Dec-04	Saba	2-0	Saipa	Mohamad Noori (37), Amir Hossain Feshangchi (82)	Fereydoon Fazli	-	3000	Hossein Asadi	9
18	2008-Dec-08	Paykan	0-1	Saba	Mohamad Noori (33)	-	-	3000	Saeed Mozafari Zadeh	8
19	2008-Dec-12	Saba	1-0	Aboomoslem	Gholamreza Rezai (89)	-	Mohsen Bayatinia	4000	Mahmoud Rafei	5
20	2008-Dec-30	Bargh	1-2	Saba	Gholamreza Rezai (15), Mohamad Hamrang (45+1)	Gholamreza Rezai, Mohsen Bayat	-	1000	Alborz Hajipour	4
21	2009-Jan-03	Saba	1-1	Sepahan	Mohamad Noori (13)	Mohsen Bayat	-	5000	Mohsen Ghahremani	3
22	2009-Jan-16	Saba	0-0	Zob Ahan	-	Mohamad Noori	-	7000	Saeed Bakhshizadeh	5
23	2009-Jan-21	Esteghlal	2-1	Saba	Mostafa Haghipour (81)	Mohsen Yousefi	-	60000	Ahmad Salehi	5
24	2009-Jan-31	Saba	2-0	Moghavemat	Mohamad Noori (2), Mohsen Bayatinia (4)	Shays Rezai	-	3000	Saeed Mozafari Zadeh	4
25	2009-Feb-04	Payam Mashhad	1-1	Saba	Mohsen Bayatinia (18)	Mohamad Hamrang	-	1000	Masoud Moradi	4
26	2009-02-13	Saba	2-2	Damash Gilan	Mohamad Noori (4), Fereydoon Fazli (55)	Mohamad Noori	-	2000	Yadolah Jahanbazi	5
27	2009-02-18	Esteghlal Ahvaz	1-1	Saba	Mohsen Bayat (56)	Mohsen Bayat, Mohamad Noori	-	4000	Ghasem Vahedi	6
28	2009-02-22	Saba	1-1	Rah Ahan	Mohamad Noori (70)	Shays Rezai, Mohsen Yousefi	-	3000	Rahim Rahimi Moghadam	6
29	2009-02-27	Saba	3-0	Malavan	Mehdi Khayri (14), Mohamad Noori (35), Mohsen Bayat (54)	Morteza Asadi, Mohsen Bayat, Gholamreza Rezai	-	4000	Ghasem Vahedi	6
30	2009-03-03	Foolad	2-2	Saba	Mohsen Yousefi (48),(82) pen	-	-	5000	Alireza Faghani	6
31	2009-04-03	Saba	2-0	Persepolis	Mohsen Yousefi (29) pen, Mehdi Khayri (38)	-	-	12000	Mohsen Torky	4
32	2009-04-12	PAS Hamedan	0-0	Saba	-	Morteza Kashi	-	2.500	Mohsen Ghahremani	6
33	2009-04-16	Saba	1-3	Mes Kerman	Fereydoon Fazli (35) pen	Amir Hossain Feshangchi, Adel Kolahkaj	Morteza Kashi	1,000	Saeed Mozafari Zadeh	6
34	2009-04-26	Saipa	2-4	Saba	Mohsen Bayatinia (19),(86) pen,(90) pen, Fereydoon Fazli (43)	Mostafa Mehdizadeh	Fereydoon Fazli	1,000	Ghasem Vahedi	6

=== Results by round ===
Round	1	2	3	4	5	6	7	8	9	10	11	12	13	14	15	16	17	18	19	20	21	22	23	24	25	26	27	28	29	30	31	32	33	34
Ground	H	A	H	A	A	H	A	H	A	H	A	A	H	A	H	A	H	A	H	A	H	H	A	H	A	H	A	H	H	A	H	A	H	A
Result	D	L	D	L	D	W	D	D	W	W	D	D	D	D	W	L	W	W	W	W	D	D	L	W	D	D	D	D	W	D	W	D	L	W
Position	9	13	14	17	17	12	13	13	11	9	9	9	9	9	9	10	9	8	5	4	3	5	5	4	4	5	6	6	6	6	4	6	6	6

Updated to match(es) played on 26 Apr 2009. Source: "Ipl".
A = Away; H = Home; W = Win; D = Draw; L = Loss

=== Results summary ===
Overall								Home						Away					
Pld	W	D	L	GF	GA	GD	Pts	W	D	L	GF	GA	GD	W	D	L	GF	GA	GD
34	12	17	5	49	36	+13	53	8	9	1	28	14	+14	4	8	4	21	22	−1

=== League standings ===
Pos	Team	Pld	W	D	L	GF	GA	GD	Pts	Qualification or relegation
4	Sepahan	34	14	14	6	46	34	+12	56	Qualification for the 2010 AFC Champions League
5	Persepolis	34	15	10	9	50	41	+9	55	
6	Saba	34	12	17	5	49	36	+13	53	
7	Foolad	34	13	11	10	50	41	+9	50	
8	Paykan	34	13	8	13	43	42	+1	47	

Updated to match(es) played on 1 September 2018. Source: IPL Stats, Soccerway
Rules for classification: 1) Points; 2) Goal difference; 3) Goals scored.

=== Scorers in IPL ===
==== Goalscorers ====
14

- (Iran) Fereydoon Fazli

8

- (Iran) Mohammad Noori

6

- (Iran) Mohsen Bayatiniya

5

- (Iran) Gholamreza Rezaei

4

- (Iran) Mahdi Kheyri

3

- (Iran) Mohsen Yousefi

1

- (Iran) Shahin Shafiei
- (Iran) Mohammad Hamrang
- (Iran) Alireza Latifi
- (Iran) Sheys Rezaei
- (Iran) Adel Kolahkaj
- (Iran) Mostafa Haghipour
- (Iran) Amir Hossein Feshangi
- (Iran) Mohsen Bayat

==== Goalassistants ====
8

- (Iran) Mohsen Yousefi

5

- (Iran) Mohammad Noori

3

- (Iran) Gholamreza Rezaei
- (Iran) Amir Hossein Feshangi
- (Iran) Adel Kolahkaj

2

- (Iran) Mahdi Kheyri

1

- (Iran) Fereydoon Fazli
- (Iran) Mohsen Bayatiniya

==== Cards ====
Player	Yellow card	Yellow card Red card	Red card
(Iran) Mohammad Noori	5	0	0
(Iran) Mohsen Bayat	4	0	1
(Iran) Fereydoon Fazli	4	0	0
(Iran) Gholamreza Rezaei	3	0	1
(Iran) Morteza Assadi	3	0	0
(Iran) Sheys Rezaei	3	0	0
(Iran) Mohsen Yousefi	3	0	0
(Iran) Mohammad Hamrang	2	0	0
(Iran) Adel Kolahkaj	2	0	0
(Iran) Amir Hossein Feshangi	0	0	1
(Iran) Yahya Golmohammadi	1	0	0
(Iran) Hamid Sarabadani	1	0	0
(Iran) Morteza Kashi	1	0	0
(Iran) Ershad Yousefi	1	0	0
(Bosnia and Herzegovina) Almir Tolja	1	0	0

==== Matches played ====
30

- (Iran) Morteza Asadi

== Hazfi Cup ==
Round	Date	Home	Score	Away	Venue	Goal	Yellow card	Red card	Fans	Ref
1/16	2009-Jan-11	Shahrdari Tabriz	0-1	Saba	Takhti /Tabriz	Mohamad Hamrang 95'	-	-	10,000	Toraj Haghverdi
1/8	2009-Apr-30	Saba	6-1	Shamoushak	Yadegar Emam/ Qom	Fereydoon Fazli 22'pen, 88', Adel Kolahkaj 29', Mohamad Hamrang 43' Mohsen Bayatinia 50' 68'	-	-	1,000	Hedayat Mombeini
1/4	2009-May-10	Saba	3-2	Mes Rafsanjan	Yadegar Emam/ Qom	Fereydoon Fazli 10', Mohamad Noori 45+2', Morteza Kashi 90+5'pen	Mohsen Bayat	-	?	Saeed Bakhshizadeh
Semifinals	2009-May-14	Saba	-	Zob Ahan Esfehan	Yadegar Emam/ Qom	-	-	-	-	-

=== Scorers in Hazfi Cup ===
==== Goalscorers ====
3

- (Iran) Fereydoon Fazli

2

- (Iran) Mohsen Bayatinia
- (Iran) Mohammad Hamrang

1

- (Iran) Adel Kolahkaj
- (Iran) Mohamad Noori
- (Iran) Morteza Kashi

==== Goalassistants ====
1

- (Iran) Amir Hossein Feshangi
- (Iran) Mostafa Mahdizadeh
- (Iran) Mohsen Bayat
- (Iran) Adel Kolahkaj

==== Cards ====
Player	Yellow card	Yellow card Red card	Red card
(Iran) Mohsen Bayat	1	0	0

== Scorers for the 2008–09 season ==
=== Goalscorers ===
16

- (Iran) Fereydoon Fazli

8

- (Iran) Mohammad Noori

=== Goalassistants ===
7

- (Iran) Mohsen Yousefi

== Asian Champions League ==
=== Group A ===
Pos	Team	Pld	W	D	L	GF	GA	GD	Pts	Qualification	HIL	PAK	SAB	AHL
1	(Saudi Arabia) Al-Hilal	6	4	2	0	10	4	+6	14	Advance to knockout stage	—	2–0	1–1	2–1
2	(Uzbekistan) Pakhtakor	6	4	1	1	9	5	+4	13	Advance to knockout stage	1–1	—	2–1	2–0
3	(Iran) Saba Qom	6	1	2	3	7	9	−2	5		0–1	1–2	—	0–0
4	(United Arab Emirates) Al-Ahli	6	0	1	5	6	14	−8	1		1–3	0–2	3–5	—

Source: WorldFootball.net

=== Schedule ===
11 March 2009
18:40

Al-Hilal (Saudi Arabia)	1–1	(Iran) Saba Battery
Hawsawi 33'	Report	Farzane 14'

King Fahd Stadium, Riyadh
Attendance: 19,000
Referee: (Malaysia) Subkhiddin Mohd Salleh

17 March 2009
15:00

Saba Battery (Iran)	0–0	(United Arab Emirates) Al-Ahli
	Report

Yadegar Emam Stadium, Qom
Attendance: 9,000
Referee: (Japan) Minoru Tojo

7 April 2009
16:00

Saba Battery (Iran)	0–2	(Uzbekistan) Pakhtakor Tashkent
	Report	Z. Tadjiyev 56'; F. Tadjiyev 64'

Yadegar Emam Stadium, Qom
Attendance: 3,645
Referee: (Qatar) Abdulrahman Abdou

22 April 2009
17:30

Pakhtakor Tashkent (Uzbekistan)	2–1	(Iran) Saba Battery
Ahmedov 36' (pen.); Andreev 49'	Report	Nouri 5'

Pakhtakor Markaziy Stadium, Tashkent
Attendance: 17,000
Referee: (Australia) Peter Green

6 May 2009
16:30

Saba Battery (Iran)	0–1	(Saudi Arabia) Al-Hilal
	Report	El Taib 42'

Yadegar Emam Stadium, Qom
Attendance: 900
Referee: (China) Tan Hai

20 May 2009
19:50 (UTC+4)

Al-Ahli (United Arab Emirates)	3–5	(Iran) Saba Battery
Khamis 31' (pen.); Al-Hawasin 45' (pen.); Meydavoudi 66'	Report	Fazli 68'; Shafiei 74'; Nouri 75'; Yousefi 82'; Hamrang 87'

Al-Rashid Stadium, Dubai
Attendance: 326
Referee: (Qatar) Abdulrahman Abdou

=== Scorers in AFC Champions League ===
==== Goalscorers ====
2

- (Iran) Mohammad Nouri

1

- (Iran) Hamid Reza Farzane
- (Iran) Fereydoon Fazli
- (Iran) Shahin Shafiei
- (Iran) Mohsen Yousefi
- (Iran) Mohammad Hamrang

==== Goalassistants ====
3

- (Iran) Mohammad Nouri

1

- (Iran) Mohsen Yousefi

==== Cards ====
Player	Yellow card	Yellow card Red card	Red card
(Iran) Mohsen Yousefi	1	0	1
(Iran) Mohsen Bayatiniya	2	0	0
(Iran) Adel Kolahkaj	2	0	0
(Iran) Gholamreza Rezaei	1	0	0
(Iran) Morteza Kashi	1	0	0
(Iran) Ali Reza Latifi	1	0	0
(Iran) Hamid Sarabadani	1	0	0
(Iran) Mohammad Hamrang	1	0	0
