= 2009 AFC Champions League knockout stage =

The 2009 AFC Champions League knockout stage was played from 26 May to 7 November 2009. A total of 16 teams competed in the knockout stage to decide the champions of the 2009 AFC Champions League.

== Qualified teams ==
The winners and runners-up of each of the eight groups in the group stage qualified for the knockout stage. Both West Zone and East Zone had eight teams qualified.

Zone	Group	Winners	Runners-up
West Zone (Groups A–D)	A	(Saudi Arabia) Al-Hilal	(Uzbekistan) Pakhtakor
West Zone (Groups A–D)	B	(Iran) Persepolis	(Saudi Arabia) Al-Shabab
West Zone (Groups A–D)	C	(Saudi Arabia) Al-Ittihad	(Qatar) Umm-Salal
West Zone (Groups A–D)	D	(Saudi Arabia) Al-Ettifaq	(Uzbekistan) Bunyodkor
East Zone (Groups E–H)	E	(Japan) Nagoya Grampus	(Australia) Newcastle Jets
East Zone (Groups E–H)	F	(Japan) Gamba Osaka	(South Korea) FC Seoul
East Zone (Groups E–H)	G	(Japan) Kashima Antlers	(South Korea) Suwon Samsung Bluewings
East Zone (Groups E–H)	H	(South Korea) Pohang Steelers	(Japan) Kawasaki Frontale

== Bracket ==
Note: while the bracket below shows the entire knockout stage, the draw for the round of 16 matches was determined at the time of the group draw, and kept teams from East and West Asia completely separate for that round.

The draw for the quarter-finals and beyond was held separately, and placed no restrictions on which teams could meet.

Round of 16
(Saudi Arabia) Al-Ettifaq	1
(Uzbekistan) Pakhtakor	2
(Saudi Arabia) Al-Ittihad	2
(Saudi Arabia) Al-Shabab	1
(Japan) Gamba Osaka	2
(Japan) Kawasaki Frontale	3
(Japan) Nagoya Grampus	2
(South Korea) Suwon Samsung Bluewings	1
(Iran) Persepolis	0
(Uzbekistan) Bunyodkor	1
(South Korea) Pohang Steelers	6
(Australia) Newcastle Jets	0
(Saudi Arabia) Al-Hilal	0 (3)
(Qatar) Umm-Salal (p)	0 (4)
(Japan) Kashima Antlers	2 (4)
(South Korea) FC Seoul (p)	2 (5)

Quarter-finals
(Uzbekistan) Pakhtakor	1	0	1
(Saudi Arabia) Al-Ittihad	1	4	5
(Japan) Kawasaki Frontale	2	1	3
(Japan) Nagoya Grampus	1	3	4
(Uzbekistan) Bunyodkor	3	1	4
(South Korea) Pohang Steelers (aet)	1	4	5
(Qatar) Umm-Salal	3	1	4
(South Korea) FC Seoul	2	1	3

Semi-finals
(Saudi Arabia) Al-Ittihad	6	2	8
(Japan) Nagoya Grampus	2	1	3
(South Korea) Pohang Steelers	2	2	4
(Qatar) Umm-Salal	0	1	1

Final
(Saudi Arabia) Al-Ittihad	1
(South Korea) Pohang Steelers	2

== Round of 16 ==
The draw for the round of 16 of the 2009 AFC Champions League was held on 7 January 2009, along with the draw for the group stage.

Team 1	Score	Team 2
West Zone
Al-Hilal (Saudi Arabia)	0–0 (a.e.t.) (3–4 p)	(Qatar) Umm-Salal
Persepolis (Iran)	0–1	(Uzbekistan) Bunyodkor
Al-Ittihad (Saudi Arabia)	2–1	(Saudi Arabia) Al-Shabab
Al-Ettifaq (Saudi Arabia)	1–2	(Uzbekistan) Pakhtakor
East Zone
Nagoya Grampus (Japan)	2–1	(South Korea) Suwon Samsung Bluewings
Gamba Osaka (Japan)	2–3	(Japan) Kawasaki Frontale
Kashima Antlers (Japan)	2–2 (a.e.t.) (4–5 p)	(South Korea) FC Seoul
Pohang Steelers (South Korea)	6–0	(Australia) Newcastle Jets

=== West Asia ===
26 May 2009
20:55 (UTC+3)

Al-Hilal (Saudi Arabia)	0–0 (a.e.t.)	(Qatar) Umm-Salal
	Report
Penalties
Rădoi (penalty scored); Seol (penalty scored); El Taib (penalty missed); Al-Swaileh (penalty scored); Al-Shalhoub (penalty missed)	3–4	(penalty missed) Ben Askar; (penalty scored) Al Naemi; (penalty scored) Magno Alves; (penalty scored) Husain; (penalty scored) Nadiya

King Fahd Stadium, Riyadh
Attendance: 17,000
Referee: Hiroyoshi Takayama (Japan)

27 May 2009
17:00 (UTC+4:30)

Persepolis (Iran)	0–1	(Uzbekistan) Bunyodkor
	Report	Rivaldo 41' (pen.)

Azadi Stadium, Tehran
Attendance: 95,225
Referee: Kim Dong-Jin (Korea Republic)

27 May 2009
20:55 (UTC+3)

Al-Ittihad (Saudi Arabia)	2–1	(Saudi Arabia) Al-Shabab
Al-Muwallad 46'; Aboucherouane 90+3'	Report	Bin Saran 18'

Prince Abdullah al-Faisal Stadium, Jeddah
Attendance: 18,000
Referee: Valentin Kovalenko (Uzbekistan)

27 May 2009
20:30 (UTC+3)

Al-Ettifaq (Saudi Arabia)	1–2	(Uzbekistan) Pakhtakor
Tagoe 32'	Report	Z. Tadjiyev 79'; Geynrikh 90+1'

Prince Mohamed bin Fahd Stadium, Dammam
Attendance: 6,527
Referee: Sun Baojie (China)

=== East Asia ===
24 June 2009
19:00 (UTC+9)

Nagoya Grampus (Japan)	2–1	(South Korea) Suwon Samsung Bluewings
Ogawa 22'; Tamada 66'	Report	Edu 69'

Mizuho Athletic Stadium, Nagoya
Attendance: 6,859
Referee: Ravshan Irmatov (Uzbekistan)

24 June 2009
19:00 (UTC+9)

Gamba Osaka (Japan)	2–3	(Japan) Kawasaki Frontale
Leandro 27', 39'	Report	K. Nakamura 33'; Renatinho 76'; Kurotsu 85'

Osaka Expo '70 Stadium, Suita
Attendance: 14,128
Referee: Ali Al-Badwawi (UAE)

24 June 2009
19:00 (UTC+9)

Kashima Antlers (Japan)	2–2 (a.e.t.)	(South Korea) FC Seoul
Koroki 5'; Aoki 50'	Report	Lee Seung-ryul 22'; Ki Sung-yong 78'
Penalties
Nakata (penalty missed); Masuda (penalty missed); Danilo (penalty scored); Iawamasa (penalty scored); Marquinhos (penalty scored); Aoki (penalty scored); Uchida (penalty missed)	4–5	(penalty missed) Damjanović; (penalty scored) Lee Sang-hyup; (penalty scored) Jung Jo-gook; (penalty missed) Adilson; (penalty scored) Ki Sung-yong; (penalty scored) Kim Jin-kyu; (penalty scored) Park Yong-ho

Kashima Soccer Stadium, Kashima
Attendance: 8,069
Referee: Ben Williams (Australia)

24 June 2009
19:30 (UTC+9)

Pohang Steelers (South Korea)	6–0	(Australia) Newcastle United Jets
Denilson 9' (pen.); Choi Hyo-jin 15', 63', 72'; Kim Jae-sung 56'; Ristić 85'	Report

Steelyard Stadium, Pohang
Attendance: 15,253
Referee: Subkhiddin Mohd Salleh (Malaysia)

== Quarter-finals ==
The draw for the quarter-finals and the remaining knockout rounds took place at Kuala Lumpur, Malaysia on June 29, 2009.

Team 1	Agg.	Team 2	1st leg	2nd leg
Umm-Salal (Qatar)	4–3	(South Korea) FC Seoul	3–2	1–1
Kawasaki Frontale (Japan)	3–4	(Japan) Nagoya Grampus	2–1	1–3
Pakhtakor (Uzbekistan)	1–5	(Saudi Arabia) Al-Ittihad	1–1	0–4
Bunyodkor (Uzbekistan)	4–5	(South Korea) Pohang Steelers	3–1	1–4 (a.e.t.)

=== First leg ===
23 September 2009
15:00 (UTC+9)

Kawasaki Frontale (Japan)	2–1	(Japan) Nagoya Grampus
K. Nakamura 60'; Juninho 63'	Report	Kennedy 28'

National Stadium, Tokyo
Attendance: 17,939
Referee: Sun Baojie (China)

23 September 2009
17:00 (UTC+5)

Bunyodkor (Uzbekistan)	3–1	(South Korea) Pohang Steelers
Karpenko 29'; Djeparov 79', 85'	Report	No Byung-jun 7'

JAR Stadium, Tashkent
Attendance: 8,350
Referee: Khalil Al-Ghamdi (Saudi Arabia)

23 September 2009
18:45 (UTC+3)

Umm-Salal (Qatar)	3–2	(South Korea) FC Seoul
Alves 55', 85'; Fabio Cesar 84'	Report	Jung Jo-gook 3', 45'

Qatar SC Stadium, Doha
Attendance: 7,139
Referee: Masoud Moradi (Iran)

24 September 2009
18:30 (UTC+5)

Pakhtakor (Uzbekistan)	1–1	(Saudi Arabia) Al-Ittihad
Nikolić 6'	Report	Al-Saqri 71'

Pakhtakor Markaziy Stadium, Tashkent
Attendance: 14,000
Referee: Ben Williams (Australia)

=== Second leg ===
30 September 2009
18:30 (UTC+9)

Pohang Steelers (South Korea)	4–1 (a.e.t.)	(Uzbekistan) Bunyodkor
Kim Jae-sung 46'; Denilson 57', 77'; Ristić 102'	Report	Victor Karpenko 89'

Steelyard Stadium, Pohang
Attendance: 16,252
Referee: Muhsen Basma (Syria)

Pohang Steelers won 5–4 on aggregate.

30 September 2009
19:00 (UTC+9)

Nagoya Grampus (Japan)	3–1	(Japan) Kawasaki Frontale
Ogawa 26'; Yoshida 35'; Kennedy 88'	Report	Chong Tese 38'

Mizuho Athletic Stadium, Nagoya
Attendance: 8,796
Referee: Abdullah Balideh (Qatar)

Nagoya Grampus won 4–3 on aggregate.

30 September 2009
20:30 (UTC+9)

FC Seoul (South Korea)	1–1	(Qatar) Umm-Salal
Damjanović 16'	Report	Askar 14'

Seoul World Cup Stadium, Seoul
Attendance: 15,348
Referee: Masaaki Toma (Japan)

Umm-Salal won 4–3 on aggregate.

30 September 2009
20:10 (UTC+3)

Al-Ittihad (Saudi Arabia)	4–0	(Uzbekistan) Pakhtakor
Al-Nemri 43'; Chermiti 55'; Aboucherouane 71'; Noor 76'	Report

Prince Abdullah al-Faisal Stadium, Jeddah
Attendance: 18,753
Referee: Kim Dong-jin (Korea)

Al-Ittihad won 5–1 on aggregate.

== Semi-finals ==
Team 1	Agg.	Team 2	1st leg	2nd leg
Al-Ittihad (Saudi Arabia)	8–3	(Japan) Nagoya Grampus	6–2	2–1
Pohang Steelers (South Korea)	4–1	(Qatar) Umm-Salal	2–0	2–1

=== First leg ===
21 October 2009
19:30 (UTC+9)

Pohang Steelers (South Korea)	2–0	(Qatar) Umm-Salal
Hwang Jae-won 45+2'; Kim Jae-sung 79'	Report

Steelyard Stadium, Pohang
Attendance: 15,635
Referee: Abdullah Al-Hilali (Oman)

21 October 2009
19:50 (UTC+3)

Al-Ittihad (Saudi Arabia)	6–2	(Japan) Nagoya Grampus
Hadid 24'; Noor 65', 76', 90+1'; Leguizamón 83'; Chermiti 90+3'	Report	Kennedy 14'; N. Nakamura 33'

Prince Abdullah al-Faisal Stadium, Jeddah
Attendance: 18,265
Referee: Ali Al-Badwawi (UAE)

=== Second leg ===
28 October 2009
19:00 (UTC+9)

Nagoya Grampus (Japan)	1–2	(Saudi Arabia) Al-Ittihad
Sugimoto 67'	Report	Al-Saqri 43'; Chermiti 59'

Mizuho Athletic Stadium, Nagoya
Attendance: 11,046
Referee: Masoud Moradi (Iran)

Al-Ittihad won 8–3 on aggregate.

28 October 2009
18:00 (UTC+3)

Umm-Salal (Qatar)	1–2	(South Korea) Pohang Steelers
Ibrahima Nadiya 90+3'	Report	Ristić 55'; No Byung-jun 60'

Qatar SC Stadium, Doha
Attendance: 9,200
Referee: Abdul Malik Bashir (Singapore)

Pohang won 4–1 on aggregate.

== Final ==
7 November 2009
19:00 (JST)

Al-Ittihad (Saudi Arabia)	1–2	(South Korea) Pohang Steelers
Noor 74'	Report	No Byung-jun 57'; Kim Hyung-il 66'

National Olympic Stadium, Tokyo
Attendance: 25,743
Referee: Matthew Breeze (Australia)
