= 2009 AFC Champions League qualifying play-off =

The 2009 AFC Champions League qualifying play-off took place between 18 and 25 February 2009. The winners of the play-off round advanced to the group stage of the 2009 AFC Champions League, while the losers in each round entered the 2009 AFC Cup group stage.

== Preliminary round ==
Team 1	Score	Team 2
East Zone
PEA (Thailand)	1–4 (aet)	Singapore Armed Forces

2009-02-18
18:00 UTC+7

PEA (Thailand)	1 – 4 (a.e.t.)	Singapore Armed Forces
Apipu 6'	Report	Arai 29'; Chaiman 97' (pen) 116'; Manzur 101'

Rajamangala Stadium, Bangkok
Attendance: 2,500
Referee: Kim Dong-Jin (Korea Rep.)

== Play-off round ==
Team 1	Score	Team 2
East Zone
Singapore Armed Forces	2–1 (aet)	(Indonesia) PSMS Medan
West Zone
Sharjah (United Arab Emirates)	3–0	(India) Dempo

2009-02-25
19:30 UTC+8

Singapore Armed Forces	2 – 1 (a.e.t.)	(Indonesia) PSMS Medan
Chaiman 36'; Latiff 99'	Report	Costas 51'

Jalan Besar Stadium, Singapore
Attendance: 2,462
Referee: Subkhiddin Mohd Salleh (Malaysia)

2009-02-25
19:00 UTC+4

Sharjah (United Arab Emirates)	3 – 0	(India) Dempo
Anderson 11'; Jean 34'; Hatab 55'	Report

Sharjah Stadium, Sharjah
Attendance: 720
Referee: Masoud Moradi (Iran)
