= 2009 AFC Champions League =

28th edition of premier club football tournament organized by the AFC

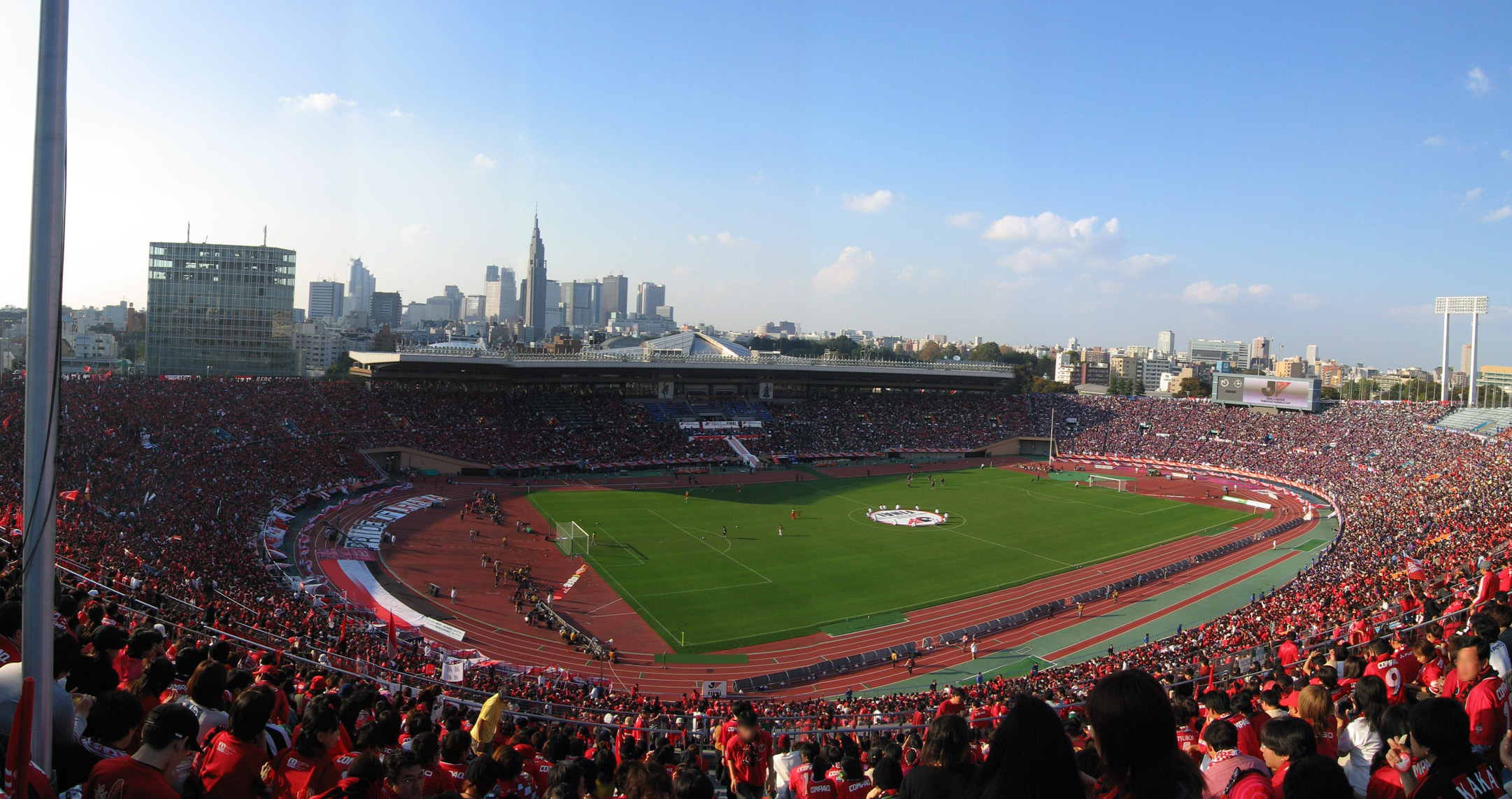
- The National Stadium in Tokyo hosted the final.

Tournament details
- Dates: Qualifying: 18 – 25 February 2009; Competition proper: 10 March – 7 November 2009
- Teams: Competition proper: 32; Total: 35 (from 13 associations)

Final positions
- Champions: (South Korea) Pohang Steelers (3rd title)
- Runners-up: (Saudi Arabia) Al-Ittihad

Tournament statistics
- Matches played: 111
- Goals scored: 329 (2.96 per match)
- Attendance: 1,396,226 (12,579 per match)
- Top scorer(s): Leandro (10 goals)
- Best player: No Byung-jun
- Fair play award: (South Korea) Pohang Steelers

The 2009 AFC Champions League was the 28th edition of the top-level Asian club football tournament organized by the Asian Football Confederation (AFC), and the 7th under the current AFC Champions League title. The final was held at the National Stadium in Tokyo on 7 November 2009, with Pohang Steelers defeating Al-Ittihad and securing a record-breaking third title. As winners, Pohang Steelers, qualified as the AFC's representative at the 2009 FIFA Club World Cup in the United Arab Emirates.

The Champions League featured a number of changes to its structure this season. Qualifying rounds were introduced, with both finalists of the previous years AFC Cup automatically earning a place in the qualifiers. The group stage was expanded from 28 to 32 teams. The first and second-placed teams in each group advanced to the knockout stage, which now included a Round of 16. The final was played as a single-legged tie at a neutral venue. The defending champions no longer received a bye to the knockout stage, nor did they automatically qualify for the tournament.

Each team was allowed to field a maximum of four foreign players this season, one of whom had to be from an AFC Member Association.

Gamba Osaka were the defending champions, but were eliminated by Kawasaki Frontale in the Round of 16.

== Qualification ==
A total of 35 teams participated in the 2009 AFC Champions League.

=== AFC assessment ranking ===
West Asia
Pos	Member Association	Points (total 500)	Clubs	Spots		
Pos	Member Association	Points (total 500)	Clubs	Group stage	Play-off	AFC Cup
4	Saudi Arabia	365	12	4	0	0
5	(United Arab Emirates) UAE	356	12	3	1	0
7	Iran	340	18	4	0	0
9	Uzbekistan	289	16	2	0	1
10	Qatar	270	10	2	0	0
13	India	202	10	0	1	1

Meet the criteria
Do not meet the criteria

East Asia
Pos	Member Association	Points (total 500)	Clubs	Spots		
Pos	Member Association	Points (total 500)	Clubs	Group stage	Play-off	AFC Cup
1	Japan	470	18	4	0	0
2	(South Korea) Korea Republic	441	14	4	0	0
3	China PR	431	16	4	0	0
6	Australia	343	7+1^{†}	2	0	0
8	Indonesia	296	18	1	1	0
11	Singapore	279	12	0	1	1
12	Thailand	221	16	0	1	1
14	Vietnam	191	14	0	0	2

^{†} One of the A-League clubs, Wellington Phoenix, is based in New Zealand, an OFC member country, therefore not being eligible to compete in the ACL.

=== Allocation of entries ===
Below is the qualification scheme for the 2009 AFC Champions League:

Qualifying play-off: (5 teams)

- United Arab Emirates, Indonesia, Singapore, Thailand, India each have 1 team qualify

Group stage: (32 teams)

- 2 qualifying play-off entries
- 4 teams qualified: Japan, China, Iran, South Korea, Saudi Arabia
- 3 teams qualified: United Arab Emirates
- 2 teams qualified: Australia, Uzbekistan, Qatar
- 1 team qualified: Indonesia

== Teams ==
In the following table, the number of appearances and last appearance count only those since the 2002–03 season (including qualifying rounds), when the competition was rebranded as the AFC Champions League. TH means title holders.

Entry round	Teams					
Entry round	West Asia			East Asia		
Group stage	(Saudi Arabia) Al-Hilal	2007–08 Saudi Premier League champions	5th (2007)	(Japan) Gamba Osaka^{TH}	2008 AFC Champions League champions 2008–09 Emperor's Cup winners	3rd (2008)
Group stage	(Saudi Arabia) Al-Shabab	2008 King Cup of Champions winners	4th (2007)	(Japan) Kashima Antlers	2008 J. League Division 1 champions	3rd (2008)
Group stage	(Saudi Arabia) Al-Ittihad	2007–08 Saudi Premier League runners-up	5th (2008)	(Japan) Kawasaki Frontale	2008 J. League Division 1 runners-up	2nd (2007)
Group stage	(Saudi Arabia) Al-Ettifaq	2007–08 Saudi Premier League fourth place	1st	(Japan) Nagoya Grampus	2008 J. League Division 1 third place	1st
Group stage	(United Arab Emirates) Al-Shabab	2007–08 UAE Football League champions	1st	(South Korea) Suwon Samsung Bluewings	2008 K-League champions	2nd (2005)
Group stage	(United Arab Emirates) Al-Ahli	2007–08 UAE President Cup winners	3rd (2005)	(South Korea) Pohang Steelers	2008 Korean FA Cup winners	2nd (2008)
Group stage	(United Arab Emirates) Al-Jazira	2007–08 UAE Football League runners-up	1st	(South Korea) FC Seoul	2008 K-League runners-up	1st
Group stage	(Iran) Pirozi	2007–08 Persian Gulf Cup champions	2nd (2002–03)	(South Korea) Ulsan Hyundai Horang-i	2008 K-League third place	2nd (2006)
Group stage	(Iran) Esteghlal	2007–08 Hazfi Cup winners Super cup 2007 iran	2nd (2002–03)	(China) Shandong Luneng Taishan	2008 Chinese Super League champions	3rd (2007)
Group stage	(Iran) Sepahan	2007–08 Persian Gulf Cup runners-up	5th (2008)	(China) Shanghai Shenhua	2008 Chinese Super League runners-up	5th (2007)
Group stage	(Iran) Saba Qom	2007–08 Persian Gulf Cup third place	2nd (2006)	(China) Beijing Guoan	2008 Chinese Super League third place	2nd (2008)
Group stage	(Uzbekistan) Bunyodkor	2008 Uzbek League champions 2008 Uzbekistan Cup winners	2nd (2008)	(China) Tianjin Teda	2008 Chinese Super League fourth place	1st
Group stage	(Uzbekistan) Pakhtakor	2008 Uzbek League runners-up	7th (2008)	(Australia) Central Coast Mariners	2007–08 A-League premiers	1st
Group stage	(Qatar) Al-Gharafa	2007–08 Qatar Stars League champions	4th (2008)	(Australia) Newcastle United Jets	2008 A-League Grand Final winners	1st
Group stage	(Qatar) Umm-Salal	2008 Emir of Qatar Cup winners	1st	(Indonesia) Sriwijaya	2007–08 Liga Indonesia Premier Division champions	1st
Qualifying play-off	(United Arab Emirates) Sharjah	2007–08 UAE Football League fourth place	2nd (2004)	(Indonesia) PSMS Medan	2007–08 Liga Indonesia Premier Division runners-up	1st
Qualifying play-off	(India) Dempo	2007–08 I-League champions	1st	Singapore Armed Forces	2008 S.League champions	1st
Qualifying play-off	(Bahrain) ~~Muharraq~~	2008 AFC Cup winners	1st	(Thailand) PEA	2008 Thailand Premier League champions	1st
Qualifying play-off	(Lebanon) ~~Safa~~	2008 AFC Cup runners-up	1st	(Vietnam) ~~Bình Dương~~	2008 V-League champions	2nd (2008)

Notes.

1. AFC Criteria (AFC): Clubs that had initially qualified for qualifying play-off, but were removed and demoted to the 2009 AFC Cup as their respective leagues did not meet the AFC's Champions League criteria.

== Schedule ==
Stage	Round	Draw date	First leg	Second leg
Qualifying play-off	Preliminary round	18 December 2008	18 February 2009	
Qualifying play-off	Play-off round	18 December 2008	25 February 2009	
Group stage	Matchday 1	7 January 2009	10–11 March 2009	
Group stage	Matchday 2	7 January 2009	17–18 March 2009	
Group stage	Matchday 3	7 January 2009	7–8 April 2009	
Group stage	Matchday 4	7 January 2009	21–22 April 2009	
Group stage	Matchday 5	7 January 2009	5–6 May 2009	
Group stage	Matchday 6	7 January 2009	19–20 May 2009	
Knockout stage	Round of 16 (Note: Two-legged ties)	No draw (Note: Pre-determined format)	27 May (Note: West Asia) and 24 June (Note: East Asia) 2009	
Knockout stage	Quarter-finals	29 June 2009	23–24 September 2009	30 September 2009
Knockout stage	Semi-finals	29 June 2009	21 October 2009	28 October 2009
Knockout stage	Final	29 June 2009	7 November 2009 at National Stadium, Tokyo	

== Qualifying play-off ==
=== Preliminary round ===
Team 1	Score	Team 2
East Zone
PEA (Thailand)	1–4 (aet)	Singapore Armed Forces

=== Play-off round ===
Team 1	Score	Team 2
East Zone
Singapore Armed Forces	2–1 (aet)	(Indonesia) PSMS Medan
West Zone
Sharjah (United Arab Emirates)	3–0	(India) Dempo

== Group stage ==
The draw for the group stage was held on 7 January 2009 in Abu Dhabi, UAE.

Each club played double round-robin (home and away) against fellow three group members, a total of 6 matches each. Each team had been numbered from 1 to 4, the numbers determine the order of the fixtures.

- Match Day 1: 1 vs 4, 3 vs 2
- Match Day 2: 2 vs 1, 4 vs 3
- Match Day 3: 1 vs 3, 4 vs 2
- Match Day 4: 3 vs 1, 2 vs 4
- Match Day 5: 4 vs 1, 2 vs 3
- Match Day 6: 1 vs 2, 3 vs 4

Clubs receive 3 points for a win, 1 point for a tie, 0 points for a loss. The clubs are ranked according to points and tie breakers are in following order:

1. Greater number of points obtained in the group matches between the teams concerned;
2. Goal difference resulting from the group matches between the teams concerned; (Away goals do not apply)
3. Greater number of goals scored in the group matches between the teams concerned; (Away goals do not apply)
4. Goal difference in all the group matches;
5. Greater number of goals scored in all the group matches;
6. Kicks from the penalty mark if only two teams are involved and they are both on the field of play;
7. Fewer score calculated according to the number of yellow and red cards received in the group matches; (1 point for each yellow card, 3 points for each red card as a consequence of two yellow cards, 3 points for each direct red card, 4 points for each yellow card followed by a direct red card)
8. Drawing of lots.

Winners and runners-up of each group qualified for the next round.

=== Group A ===
Pos	Team	Pld	W	D	L	GF	GA	GD	Pts	Qualification	HIL	PAK	SAB	AHL
1	(Saudi Arabia) Al-Hilal	6	4	2	0	10	4	+6	14	Advance to knockout stage	—	2–0	1–1	2–1
2	(Uzbekistan) Pakhtakor	6	4	1	1	9	5	+4	13	Advance to knockout stage	1–1	—	2–1	2–0
3	(Iran) Saba Qom	6	1	2	3	7	9	−2	5		0–1	1–2	—	0–0
4	(United Arab Emirates) Al-Ahli	6	0	1	5	6	14	−8	1		1–3	0–2	3–5	—

Source: WorldFootball.net

=== Group B ===
Pos	Team	Pld	W	D	L	GF	GA	GD	Pts	Qualification	PRS	SHB	GHA	SHA
1	(Iran) Persepolis	4	2	1	1	5	6	−1	7	Advance to knockout stage	—	1–0	3–1	~~3–1~~
2	(Saudi Arabia) Al-Shabab	4	2	1	1	4	2	+2	7	Advance to knockout stage	0–0	—	1–0	~~5–0~~
3	(Qatar) Al-Gharafa	4	1	0	3	7	8	−1	3		5–1	1–3	—	
4	(United Arab Emirates) Sharjah (Note: Sharjah were found guilty of fielding an ineligible player Abdelaziz Mohamed Al Mazam during the team’s AFC Champions League match against Al Shabab of Saudi Arabia on 8.4.09. Thus, Al Sharjah were fined USD 4000 and the match was awarded to Al Shabab 3-0.)	0	0	0	0	0	0	0	0	Withdrew (Note: Sharjah withdrew from the competition with two games remaining. Their results were expunged.)		~~1–3~~	~~0–2~~	—

Source: WorldFootball.net

=== Group C ===
Pos	Team	Pld	W	D	L	GF	GA	GD	Pts	Qualification	ITT	UMS	JAZ	EST
1	(Saudi Arabia) Al-Ittihad	6	3	3	0	14	4	+10	12	Advance to knockout stage	—	7–0	1–1	2–1
2	(Qatar) Umm-Salal	6	2	2	2	6	13	−7	8	Advance to knockout stage	1–3	—	2–2	1–0
3	(United Arab Emirates) Al-Jazira	6	0	5	1	6	7	−1	5		0–0	0–1	—	2–2
4	(Iran) Esteghlal	6	0	4	2	6	8	−2	4		1–1	1–1	1–1	—

Source: WorldFootball.net

=== Group D ===
Pos	Team	Pld	W	D	L	GF	GA	GD	Pts	Qualification	ETT	BUN	SEP	SHB
1	(Saudi Arabia) Al-Ettifaq	6	4	0	2	15	8	+7	12	Advance to knockout stage	—	4–0	2–1	4–1
2	(Uzbekistan) Bunyodkor	6	2	2	2	5	9	−4	8	Advance to knockout stage	2–1	—	2–2	0–0
3	(Iran) Sepahan	6	2	1	3	9	7	+2	7		3–0	0–1	—	2–0
4	(United Arab Emirates) Al-Shabab	6	2	1	3	6	11	−5	7		1–4	2–0	2–1	—

Source: WorldFootball.net

=== Group E ===
Pos	Team	Pld	W	D	L	GF	GA	GD	Pts	Qualification	NAG	NEW	ULS	BEI
1	(Japan) Nagoya Grampus	6	3	3	0	10	4	+6	12	Advance to knockout stage	—	1–1	4–1	0–0
2	(Australia) Newcastle Jets	6	3	1	2	6	5	+1	10	Advance to knockout stage	0–1	—	2–0	2–1
3	(South Korea) Ulsan Hyundai Horang-i	6	2	0	4	4	10	−6	6		1–3	0–1	—	1–0
4	(China) Beijing Guoan	6	1	2	3	4	5	−1	5		1–1	2–0	0–1	—

Source: WorldFootball.net

=== Group F ===
Pos	Team	Pld	W	D	L	GF	GA	GD	Pts	Qualification	OSA	SEO	SHA	SRI
1	(Japan) Gamba Osaka	6	5	0	1	17	4	+13	15	Advance to knockout stage	—	1–2	3–0	5–0
2	(South Korea) FC Seoul	6	3	1	2	14	11	+3	10	Advance to knockout stage	2–4	—	1–1	5–1
3	(China) Shandong Luneng	6	2	1	3	10	9	+1	7		0–1	2–0	—	5–0
4	(Indonesia) Sriwijaya	6	1	0	5	7	24	−17	3		0–3	2–4	4–2	—

Source: WorldFootball.net

=== Group G ===
Pos	Team	Pld	W	D	L	GF	GA	GD	Pts	Qualification	KAS	SUW	SHA	SAF
1	(Japan) Kashima Antlers	6	4	1	1	16	6	+10	13	Advance to knockout stage	—	3–0	2–0	5–0
2	(South Korea) Suwon Samsung Bluewings	6	4	0	2	12	8	+4	12	Advance to knockout stage	4–1	—	2–1	3–1
3	(China) Shanghai Shenhua	6	2	2	2	9	8	+1	8		1–1	2–1	—	4–1
4	Singapore Armed Forces	6	0	1	5	4	19	−15	1		1–4	0–2	1–1	—

Source: WorldFootball.net

=== Group H ===
Pos	Team	Pld	W	D	L	GF	GA	GD	Pts	Qualification	POH	KAW	TIA	CCM
1	(South Korea) Pohang Steelers	6	3	3	0	7	3	+4	12	Advance to knockout stage	—	1–1	1–0	3–2
2	(Japan) Kawasaki Frontale	6	3	1	2	10	7	+3	10	Advance to knockout stage	0–2	—	1–0	2–1
3	(China) Tianjin Teda	6	2	2	2	6	5	+1	8		0–0	3–1	—	2–2
4	(Australia) Central Coast Mariners	6	0	2	4	5	13	−8	2		0–0	0–5	0–1	—

Source: WorldFootball.net

== Knockout stage ==
=== Bracket ===
Round of 16
(Saudi Arabia) Al-Ettifaq	1
(Uzbekistan) Pakhtakor	2
(Saudi Arabia) Al-Ittihad	2
(Saudi Arabia) Al-Shabab	1
(Japan) Gamba Osaka	2
(Japan) Kawasaki Frontale	3
(Japan) Nagoya Grampus	2
(South Korea) Suwon Samsung Bluewings	1
(Iran) Persepolis	0
(Uzbekistan) Bunyodkor	1
(South Korea) Pohang Steelers	6
(Australia) Newcastle Jets	0
(Saudi Arabia) Al-Hilal	0 (3)
(Qatar) Umm-Salal (p)	0 (4)
(Japan) Kashima Antlers	2 (4)
(South Korea) FC Seoul (p)	2 (5)

Quarter-finals
(Uzbekistan) Pakhtakor	1	0	1
(Saudi Arabia) Al-Ittihad	1	4	5
(Japan) Kawasaki Frontale	2	1	3
(Japan) Nagoya Grampus	1	3	4
(Uzbekistan) Bunyodkor	3	1	4
(South Korea) Pohang Steelers (aet)	1	4	5
(Qatar) Umm-Salal	3	1	4
(South Korea) FC Seoul	2	1	3

Semi-finals
(Saudi Arabia) Al-Ittihad	6	2	8
(Japan) Nagoya Grampus	2	1	3
(South Korea) Pohang Steelers	2	2	4
(Qatar) Umm-Salal	0	1	1

Final
(Saudi Arabia) Al-Ittihad	1
(South Korea) Pohang Steelers	2

=== Round of 16 ===
The draw for the round of 16 of the 2009 AFC Champions League was held on 7 January 2009, along with the draw for the group stage. The West Asian matches were played on 26 and 27 May. The East Asian matches were played on 24 June.

Team 1	Score	Team 2
West Zone
Al-Hilal (Saudi Arabia)	0–0 (a.e.t.) (3–4 p)	(Qatar) Umm-Salal
Persepolis (Iran)	0–1	(Uzbekistan) Bunyodkor
Al-Ittihad (Saudi Arabia)	2–1	(Saudi Arabia) Al-Shabab
Al-Ettifaq (Saudi Arabia)	1–2	(Uzbekistan) Pakhtakor
East Zone
Nagoya Grampus (Japan)	2–1	(South Korea) Suwon Samsung Bluewings
Gamba Osaka (Japan)	2–3	(Japan) Kawasaki Frontale
Kashima Antlers (Japan)	2–2 (a.e.t.) (4–5 p)	(South Korea) FC Seoul
Pohang Steelers (South Korea)	6–0	(Australia) Newcastle Jets

=== Quarter-finals ===
The draw for the quarter-finals and the remaining knockout rounds took place at Kuala Lumpur, Malaysia on 29 June 2009. The first leg matches were played on 23–24 September, with the second leg matches were played on 30 September.

Team 1	Agg.	Team 2	1st leg	2nd leg
Umm-Salal (Qatar)	4–3	(South Korea) FC Seoul	3–2	1–1
Kawasaki Frontale (Japan)	3–4	(Japan) Nagoya Grampus	2–1	1–3
Pakhtakor (Uzbekistan)	1–5	(Saudi Arabia) Al-Ittihad	1–1	0–4
Bunyodkor (Uzbekistan)	4–5	(South Korea) Pohang Steelers	3–1	1–4 (a.e.t.)

=== Semi-finals ===
The first leg matches were played on 21 October, with the second leg matches were played on 28 October 2009.

Team 1	Agg.	Team 2	1st leg	2nd leg
Al-Ittihad (Saudi Arabia)	8–3	(Japan) Nagoya Grampus	6–2	2–1
Pohang Steelers (South Korea)	4–1	(Qatar) Umm-Salal	2–0	2–1

=== Final ===
The 2009 AFC Champions League Final was played on 7 November at National Stadium, Tokyo, Japan.

7 November 2009
19:00 (JST)

Al-Ittihad (Saudi Arabia)	1–2	(South Korea) Pohang Steelers
Noor 74'	Report	No Byung-jun 57'; Kim Hyung-il 66'

National Olympic Stadium, Tokyo
Attendance: 25,743
Referee: Matthew Breeze (Australia)

== Top scorers ==
Note: Goals scored in qualifying round not counted.

Rank	Player	Club	MD1	MD2	MD3	MD4	MD5	MD6	R16	QF1	QF2	SF1	SF2	F	Total
1	(Brazil) Leandro	(Japan) Gamba Osaka	1	3	2	1	1		2						10
2	(Ghana) Prince Tagoe	(Saudi Arabia) Al-Ettifaq			2	3	2		1						8
3	(Brazil) Denilson	(South Korea) Pohang Steelers					3	1	1		2				7
4	(Saudi Arabia) Nasser Al-Shamrani	(Saudi Arabia) Al-Shabab	1		1	3	1								6
5	(Saudi Arabia) Mohammed Noor	(Saudi Arabia) Al-Ittihad									1	3		1	5
5	(Japan) Yoshizumi Ogawa	(Japan) Nagoya Grampus				1	2		1		1				5
5	(Morocco) Hicham Aboucherouane	(Saudi Arabia) Al-Ittihad	1	1			1		1		1				5
5	(Montenegro) Dejan Damjanović	(South Korea) FC Seoul					3	1			1				5
5	(Brazil) Renatinho	(Japan) Kawasaki Frontale	1		1	1	1		1						5
5	(Uzbekistan) Zaynitdin Tadjiyev	(Uzbekistan) Pakhtakor	1	1	1		1		1						5
5	(Brazil) Araújo	(Qatar) Al-Gharafa	1	1		3									5

== See also ==
- 2009 AFC Cup
- 2009 AFC President's Cup
- 2009 FIFA Club World Cup
