= Mohamed Ghanem Salman =

Kuwaiti footballer (born 1984)

Mohamed Ghanem محمد غانم
Personal information
- Full name: Mohamed Ghanem Salman Ghanem
- Date of birth: 4 May 1984 (age 42)
- Place of birth: Kuwait
- Position: Goalkeeper

Youth career
- –2005: Al-Arabi

Senior career*
Years	Team	Apps	(Gls)
2005–2013	Al-Arabi		
2015–2021	Mesaimeer		
2019–2020	→ Qatar (loan)		
- * Club domestic league appearances and goals

Mohamed Ghanem Salman (Arabic:محمد غانم سلمان) (born 4 May 1984) is a Kuwaiti footballer who plays as a goalkeeper.

He is the brother of the Qatari international player Saoud Ghanem .

== Career ==
=== Al-Arabi ===
Mohamed Ghanem was born in Kuwait and he is a Bidoon, started his career at Al-Arabi and is a product of the Arabi's youth system, and he played with them until 2013 .

=== Mesaimeer ===
On 15 September 2015, he obtained the Qatari passport and signed with Mesaimeer . On 6 March 2016, Mohamed Ghanem made his professional debut for Mesaimeer against El Jaish in the Pro League .

=== Qatar SC ===
On 5 July 2019, he left Mesaimeer and signed with Qatar on loan of the season.
