= Mohamed Salmeen =

Bahraini footballer (born 1980)

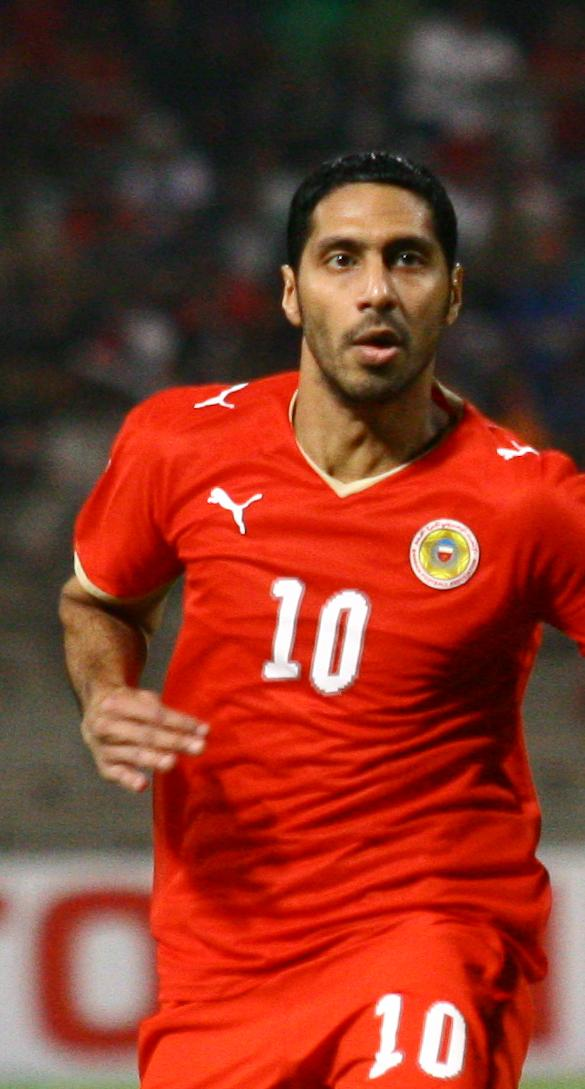

Personal information
- Full name: Mohamed Ahmed Salmeen
- Date of birth: 4 November 1980 (age 45)
- Place of birth: Muharraq, Bahrain
- Height: 1.83 m (6 ft 0 in)
- Position: Midfielder

Youth career
- 1990–1999: Muharraq

Senior career*
Years	Team	Apps	(Gls)
1999–2004	Muharraq		
2004–2007	Al-Arabi		
2007–2009	Muharraq		
2009–2010	Al Dhafra	8	(1)
2010–2016	Muharraq		

International career
1997	Bahrain U-17	3	(0)
2000–2013	Bahrain	126	(11)
- * Club domestic league appearances and goals

Mohamed Ahmed Youssef Salmeen (Arabic: مُحَمَّد أَحْمَد يُوسُف سَالِمَيْن; born 4 November 1980) is a Bahraini former professional footballer who played for Muharraq and the Bahrain national team. He was captain of the Bahrain national team and wore the number 10 jersey for his club and country. He is the son of Bahraini footballer Ahmed Salmeen. Salmeen participated in three World Cup qualifying campaigns.

He played in Qatar from 2004 to 2007 with Al-Arabi.

== Club career ==
Salmeen announced the retirement in 2016.

== International career ==
=== Youth level ===
Salmeen appeared in all three matches for Bahrain in 1997 FIFA U-17 World Championship.

In 2002, he participated with U-23 level in 2002 Asian games that Bahrain reached quarter-final.

=== Senior level ===
Salmeen debuted for Bahrain in 2000. He scored the winning goal against Iran in 2000 AFC Asian Cup qualification campaign.

In 2004 AFC Asian Cup Salmeen and his teammates put in a great performance, leading Bahrain to fourth place.

He missed 2011 AFC Asian Cup due to broken leg from pre-tournament friendly match.

He retired from international career after failed to lead Bahrain to the title of 21st Arabian Gulf Cup which held in home country.

== Style of style and awards ==
After the first leg of Bahrain's 2006 FIFA World Cup qualifying match against Trinidad and Tobago, Trinidadi captain Dwight Yorke claimed that Salmeen was good enough to play in the Premiership. Salmeen was shortlisted for being Asian Footballer of the Year, and had a place in the all-star team of the 2004 Asian Cup tournament. He was also once named Player of the Arabian Gulf Cup tournament, receiving the Golden Ball.

== Personal life ==
Salmeen's father Ahmed Salmeen played for Muharraq in the 1970s and 1980s. His brother Yousuf Salmeen is a defender, who also plays for Muharraq and has recently won the 2010 league title.

== Career statistics ==
Appearances and goals by national team and year
National team	Year	Apps	Goals
Bahrain	2000	2	1
Bahrain	2001	16	2
Bahrain	2002	9	2
Bahrain	2003	6	1
Bahrain	2004	26	2
Bahrain	2005	9	0
Bahrain	2006	3	0
Bahrain	2007	8	0
Bahrain	2008	14	0
Bahrain	2009	18	2
Bahrain	2010	5	0
Bahrain	2011	1	0
Bahrain	2012	3	0
Bahrain	2013	6	1
Total		126	11

Scores and results list Bahrain's goal tally first, score column indicates score after each Salmeen goal.

List of international goals scored by Mohamed Salmeen
No.	Date	Venue	Cap	Opponent	Score	Result	Competition	Ref.
1	4 April 2000	Aleppo, Syria	1	Iran	1–0	1–0	2000 AFC Asian Cup qualification	
2	21 February 2001	Kuwait City, Kuwait	6	Kyrgyzstan	1–1	2–1	2002 FIFA World Cup qualification	
3	17 August 2001	Riyadh, Saudi Arabia	12	Saudi Arabia	1–1	1–1	2002 FIFA World Cup qualification	
4	7 January 2002	Manama, Bahrain	20	North Macedonia	1–0	1–1	Friendly	
5	12 December 2002	Manama, Bahrain	26	China	1–1	2–2	Friendly	
6	30 December 2003	Kuwait City, Kuwait	33	Yemen	1–0	5–0	16th Arabian Gulf Cup	
7	3 January 2004	Kuwait City, Kuwait	35	Oman	1–0	1–0	16th Arabian Gulf Cup	
8	10 January 2004	Kuwait City, Kuwait	37	Kuwait	3–0	4–0	16th Arabian Gulf Cup	
9	23 March 2009	Riffa, Bahrain	101	Zimbabwe		5–2	Friendly	
10	3 June 2009	Riffa, Bahrain	104	Jordan		4–0	Friendly	
11	19 November 2013	Riffa, Bahrain	126	Yemen		2–0	2015 AFC Asian Cup qualification	

== See also ==
- List of men's footballers with 100 or more international caps
