= Mousa Hatab =

Emirati footballer (born 1981)

Personal information
- Full name: Mousa Abdurahman Hatab Al-Bloushi
- Date of birth: 12 April 1981 (age 45)
- Place of birth: United Arab Emirates
- Height: 1.84 m (6 ft 1/2 in)
- Position: Defender

Senior career*
Years	Team	Apps	(Gls)
2001–2007	Ittihad Kalba		
2007–2012	Al-Sharjah		
2012–2013	Ajman		
2013–2015	Ittihad Kalba		
2015–2017	Hatta		
2017–2018	Ittihad Kalba		

International career
2003	United Arab Emirates		
- * Club domestic league appearances and goals

Mousa Hatab (Arabic:موسى حطب) (born 12 April 1981) is an Emirati footballer. He currently plays as a defender.
