= 2004 CAF Confederation Cup group stage =

The group stage of the 2004 CAF Confederation Cup was played from 7 August to 14 November 2004. A total of eight teams competed in the group stage.

== Format ==
In the group stage, each group was played on a home-and-away round-robin basis. The winners of each group advanced directly to the final.

Key to colours in group tables
Group winners advance to the final

== Groups ==
=== Group A ===
Team	Pts	Pld	W	D	L	GF	GA	GD
(Ghana) Asante Kotoko	10	6	3	1	2	10	7	+3
(Nigeria) Enugu Rangers	10	6	3	1	2	12	6	+6
(Sudan) Al-Hilal	9	6	3	0	3	6	11	+5
(Angola) Petro de Luanda	5	6	1	2	3	5	9	-4

Team 1	Score	Team 2
Asante Kotoko (Ghana)	3–1	(Nigeria) Enugu Rangers
Petro de Luanda (Angola)	3–1	(Sudan) Al-Hilal
Enugu Rangers (Nigeria)	4–0	(Angola) Petro de Luanda
Al-Hilal (Sudan)	2–0	(Ghana) Asante Kotoko
Enugu Rangers (Nigeria)	4–0	(Sudan) Al-Hilal
Asante Kotoko (Ghana)	2–1	(Angola) Petro de Luanda
Al-Hilal (Sudan)	2–1	(Nigeria) Enugu Rangers
Petro de Luanda (Angola)	1–1	(Ghana) Asante Kotoko
Al-Hilal (Sudan)	1–0	(Angola) Petro de Luanda
Enugu Rangers (Nigeria)	2–1	(Ghana) Asante Kotoko
Asante Kotoko (Ghana)	3–0	(Sudan) Al-Hilal
Petro de Luanda (Angola)	0–0	(Nigeria) Enugu Rangers

=== Group B ===
Team	Pts	Pld	W	D	L	GF	GA	GD
(Ghana) Hearts of Oak	13	6	4	1	1	10	5	+5
(Cameroon) Coton Sport FC	11	6	3	2	1	9	3	+6
(Cameroon) Sable FC	7	6	2	1	3	6	9	-3
(South Africa) Santos FC	3	6	1	0	5	3	11	-8

Team 1	Score	Team 2
Hearts of Oak (Ghana)	1–0	(South Africa) Santos FC
Sable FC (Cameroon)	0–0	(Cameroon) Coton Sport FC
Santos FC (South Africa)	1–0	(Cameroon) Sable FC
Coton Sport FC (Cameroon)	0–0	(Ghana) Hearts of Oak
Coton Sport FC (Cameroon)	4–0	(South Africa) Santos FC
Sable FC (Cameroon)	2–0	(Ghana) Hearts of Oak
Santos FC (South Africa)	0–2	(Cameroon) Coton Sport FC
Hearts of Oak (Ghana)	5–1	(Cameroon) Sable FC
Santos FC (South Africa)	0–1	(Ghana) Hearts of Oak
Coton Sport FC (Cameroon)	1–0	(Cameroon) Sable FC
Hearts of Oak (Ghana)	3–2	(Cameroon) Coton Sport FC
Sable FC (Cameroon)	3–2	(South Africa) Santos FC
