= Ibrahima Nadiya =

Qatari footballer (born 1985)

Ibrahima Ndiaye
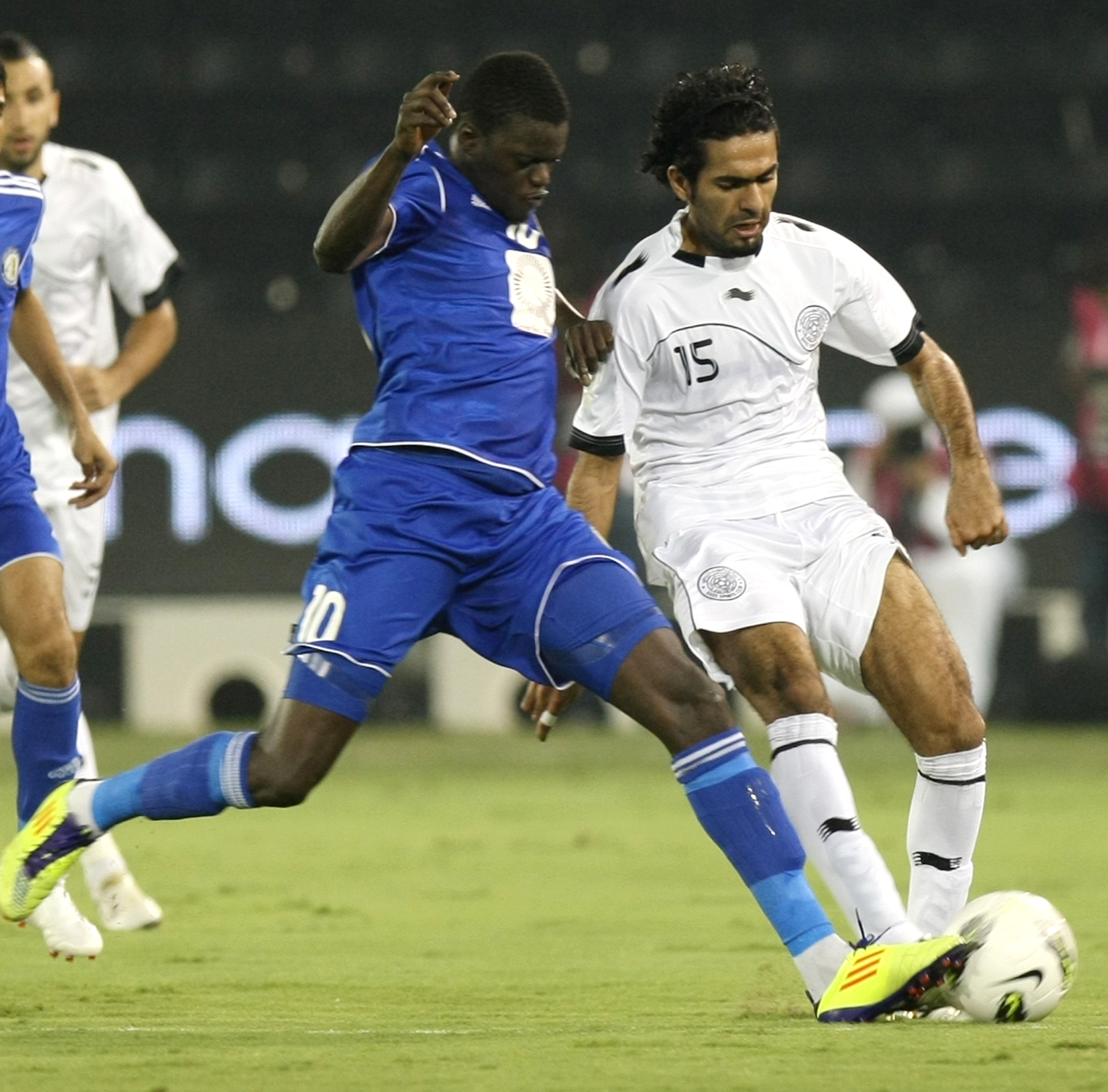
- Nadiya (left) playing for Al Khor (2011)

Personal information
- Full name: Ibrahima Ndiaye
- Date of birth: 11 March 1985 (age 41)
- Place of birth: Dakar, Senegal
- Height: 1.74 m (5 ft 8 1/2 in)
- Position: Midfielder

Youth career
- 1999–2003: Racing Club de Lens

Senior career*
Years	Team	Apps	(Gls)
2003–2010	Umm Salal	123	(28)
2010–2011	Al-Rayyan	10	(1)
2011–2012	Al-Khor	10	(5)
2012	Al Rayyan	2	(1)
2012–2014	Umm Salal	10	(0)
2014–2015	Al-Khor		
2015–2016	Al-Shahania		
2017–2018	Umm Salal		
2018–2019	Al-Shamal		

International career
2008–present	Qatar	14	(1)
- * Club domestic league appearances and goals as of 5 March 2013

Ibrahima Ndiaye (born 11 March 1985) is a former footballer. Born in Senegal, he represented the Qatar national team.

== Career ==
Ndiaye began his career in the youth team of RC Lens and was in summer 2003 signed by Qatari club Umm-Salal Sports Club. The midfielder joined after a half year with Al Rayyan SC in January 2011 to Al-Khor Sports Club.

== International career ==
He is a member of the Qatar national football team.
