= Saoud Ghanem =

Qatari footballer (born 1981)

Saoud Ghanem سعود غانم
Personal information
- Full name: Saoud Ghanem Salman Ghanem
- Date of birth: 5 February 1981 (age 45)
- Place of birth: Kuwait
- Position: Midfielder

Youth career
- Sulaibikhat

Senior career*
Years	Team	Apps	(Gls)
2001–2005	Al-Sadd		
2005–2006	Al-Wakrah		
2006–2009	Umm Salal		
2009–2010	Al-Sailiya		
2010–2012	Umm Salal		

International career
1998–2008	Qatar	14	(1)
- * Club domestic league appearances and goals

Saoud Ghanem (Arabic:سعود غانم; born 5 February 1981) is a former footballer. He currently plays as a midfielder . Born in Kuwait, he represented the Qatar national team.

He is the brother of the Qatari player Mohamed Ghanem.

== Career ==
He formerly played for Al-Sadd, Al-Wakrah, Umm Salal, Al-Sailiya and Qatar national football team .
