= Prince Tagoe =

Ghanaian footballer (born 1986)

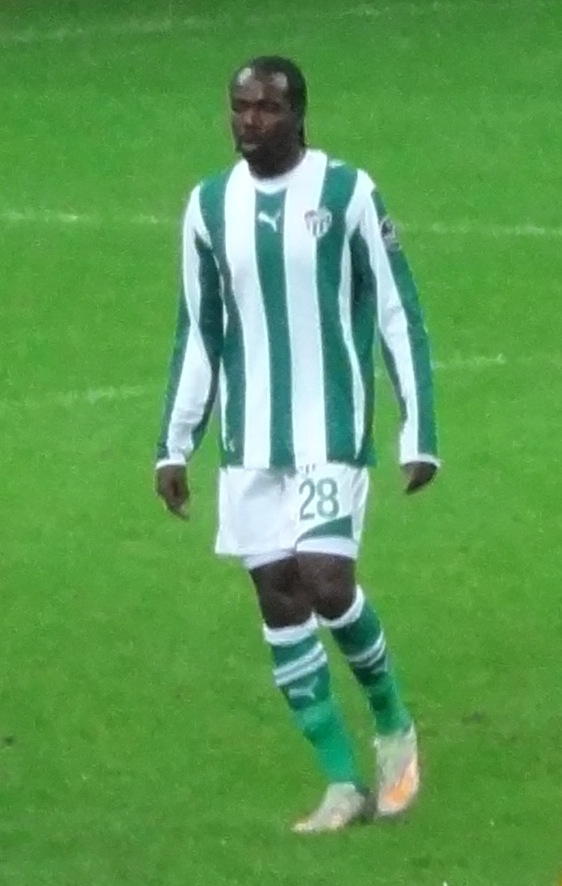
- Tagoe with Bursaspor in 2011

Personal information
- Date of birth: 9 November 1986 (age 39)
- Place of birth: Accra, Ghana
- Height: 1.88 m (6 ft 2 in)
- Position: Forward

Youth career
- Tudu Mighty Jets

Senior career*
Years	Team	Apps	(Gls)
2003–2006	Midtjylland-Maamobi		
2004–2005	→ Hearts of Oak (loan)		(18)
2006	→ Ittihad (loan)		(8)
2006–2007	Al Shabab	16	(10)
2007–2009	Ettifaq		(14)
2009–2011	1899 Hoffenheim	20	(2)
2011	→ Partizan (loan)	15	(9)
2011–2013	Bursaspor	11	(1)
2013	→ Ettifaq (loan)	8	(1)
2013	Club Africain	0	(0)
2014	Kelantan FA	3	(1)
2014	Hapoel Bnei Lod	1	(0)
2018	Isparta Davrazspor	0	(0)
2019	Chittagong Abahani	0	(0)

International career
2006–2012	Ghana	36	(7)
- * Club domestic league appearances and goals as of 29 October 2019

Prince Tagoe (born 9 November 1986) is a Ghanaian former professional footballer who played as a forward and is currently working as a sports television panellist along with Charles Taylor on Angel TV sports programme.

Born in Accra, Ghana, Tagoe played for Accra-based team Hearts of Oak from 2004 to 2005, where he won the Ghana Premier League in 2004 and the CAF Confederation Cup also in 2004. Helping Hearts of Oak to the league title, he scored 18 goals to win the top goal scorer of the league that season. He went on and played in Asia for Saudi Arabian sides Ittihad, UAE side Al Shabab and Ettifaq FC also in Saudi Arabia. He secured a 3-year deal to Bundesliga side 1899 Hoffenheim in 2009 but only played 20 league matches and scored 2 goals. In 2011, he joined Serbian club Partizan where he scored 12 times (nine league and three cup goals), as the club won the double, winning the 2010–11 Serbian SuperLiga and 2010–11 Serbian Cup.

At international level, Tagoe represented Ghana 36 times and scored seven goals. He featured at two African Cup of Nationals finals, in 2006 and in 2012. He was also a member of the Black Stars at the 2010 FIFA World Cup. during his playing time with Hearts of Oak, he was nicknamed the ''Prince of goals'' due his striking prowess.

== Club career ==
=== Early years ===
Born in Accra, Ghana. Tagoe started out at local club Tudu Mighty Jets. He made his senior debuts with Midtjylland-Maamobi in the lower national league. He later joined Accra Hearts of Oak in 2004 and went on loan to Ittihad FC in Saudi Arabia before joining Al Shabab in UAE.

=== Hearts of Oak ===
Tagoe joined Hearts of Oak on a one-year loan deal from Midtjylland-Maamobi. It was during his time at the Accra-based team that his prominence grew both at the national and continental level. He struck a hat-trick in Hearts of Oak's 5–1 demolition of Cameroon side Sable de Batie in the maiden CAF Confederation Cup in 2004, which helped to push the club to the top their group, qualify and set up an all Ghanaian final against their fierce rivals Kumasi Asante Kotoko. In the final, he played in both legs as Hearts defeated their archrivals during a marathon 8–9 penalty shoot-out to win after the two legs ended 2–2 on aggregate. While playing on loan for Hearts of Oak, Tagoe became the Ghana Premier League top scorer with 18 goals in 2005 at the age of 19.

=== Saudi Arabia and UAE ===
In January 2006, Tagoe was close to sign for German club Mainz 05, but the transfer failed. He eventually moved to Saudi Arabian side Ittihad. In September 2007, he scored a brace in a 5–1 victory over Al Qadsiah. After six months, Tagoe moved to another Middle East country, this time to United Arab Emirates and signed for Al Shabab. This prompted Midtjylland-Maamobi to report Tagoe to FIFA as they believed the club had loaned him to Ittihad. After a year and 10 league goals for Al Shabab, Tagoe returned to Saudi Arabia to play for Ettifaq. He spent two years with Ettifaq, performing especially well during the 2009 AFC Champions League with eight goals in six matches.

=== 1899 Hoffenheim ===
On 9 June 2009, Tagoe signed a three-year contract with Bundesliga side 1899 Hoffenheim, before being released from his contract on 1 August after only 51 days due to heart issues. Tagoe's lawyer contested the dismissal as a second opinion did not yield evidence of a heart condition. On 20 August, Tagoe was resigned to Hoffenheim after an announcement that his earlier release had contravened FIFA regulations. He was originally unable to play in the Bundesliga as his playing license was revoked when it was revealed that the original documentation of his physical examinations had been faked. As a result of the falsification of the data, Deutsche Fußball Liga requested further medical examinations in order to assess Tagoe's fitness. On 21 October, DFL announced the health issue was not significant enough to warrant the cancellation of his contract and that the player could be in a position to have his license reinstated pending the results of the final test in December 2009. This medical test showed that he was fit and had not a cardiac defect. On 11 January 2010, he had his playing license reinstated and was eligible to play for his club.

Finally, Tagoe made his debut for the club on 30 January 2010, coming on as an 82nd-minute substitute for Boris Vukčević, in a league match versus Schalke 04. He scored his first goal for the club in the DFB-Pokal quarter-finals against Werder Bremen on 9 February. His first Bundesliga goals came on 1 May 2010 against Eintracht Frankfurt, when he came from the bench and scored a brace for a 2–1 away victory.

==== Loan to Partizan ====
On 31 January 2011, Tagoe joined Serbian club Partizan on loan until the end of the 2010–11 season, with a view to a permanent deal. He marked his competitive debut scoring a brace in a league match against Inđija. Tagoe also scored a goal in the next two rounds against Hajduk Kula (away) and OFK Beograd (home). He continued his fantastic start for Partizan with two goals in the first leg of the Serbian Cup semi-final against cross-town rivals Red Star Belgrade. In April 2011, he also scored the lone goal in a match against rivals Red Star to send Partizan three points clear of their rivals as league leaders. During his stint at Partizan, Tagoe scored 12 times (nine league and three cup goals), as the club won the double, winning the 2010–11 Serbian SuperLiga and 2010–11 Serbian Cup. Despite his good performances, Tagoe did not stay at the club.

=== Bursaspor ===
On 1 September 2011, Tagoe signed a three-year deal with Turkish side Bursaspor. He scored his first goal for the club in a 1–1 draw against Orduspor on 26 October 2011. That was his only goal in 11 league appearances during the 2011–12 season.

==== Loan to Ettifaq ====
In January 2013, Tagoe joined his former club Ettifaq on a six-month loan.

=== Kelantan FA ===
In late April 2014, Tagoe was unveiled as a new signing of Malaysia Super League side Kelantan FA, penning a six-month contract. In early May 2014, it was said that Tagoe cannot play for Kelantan FA due to the non availability of his International Transfer Certificate (ITC) and going to be replaced by former Kelantan FA player Obinna Nwaneri who was replaced with him during the April transfer window. However, this was denied by Kelantan FA manager Azman Ibrahim who said that Kelantan FA are still hoping to use him in the Malaysia Super League and believe that the case can be solved and the supporter wish to see the former 2010 FIFA World Cup player to play with Kelantan FA can be fulfilled. On 11 May 2014, the case was solved and was confirmed by Kelantan FA president Annuar Musa through his Facebook account that Tagoe could play for Kelantan FA on 17 May 2014 against Perak FA.

=== Hapoel Bnei Lod ===
In late November 2014, Tagoe signed a short-term contract with Israeli club Hapoel Bnei Lod. He played one game in the Liga Leumit, the second tier of Israeli football, coming on as a late second-half substitute in a 0–0 draw against Hapoel Nazareth Illit.

=== Later years ===
In May 2016, Tagoe denied his retirement from professional football despite being without a club for over a year.

In August 2018, after being unattached for more than three and a half years, Tagoe signed with Turkish side Isparta Davrazspor. He, however, parted ways with the club just a few weeks later, failing to make an appearance.

==== Bangladesh ====
In October 2019, he signed with Chittagong Abahani of Bangladesh for 2019 Sheikh Kamal International Club Cup. The port city outfit wanted to give a surprise to the local fans by including a player who had featured in the World Cup, without assessing the present condition of Tagoe, who had not been playing regularly in the last four years. When he arrived in Chittagong two days before the meet, the team was surprised about his fitness level and physical condition, but nothing could be done about the situation than to include him in the squad because the registration deadline had already passed.

Out of six foreign players the 2015 champion brought in with the target to win the title again, it was only Tagoe who could not prove himself fit enough to play a single minute in the three group phase games.

== International career ==
=== Youth ===
Tagoe played for the Ghana under-20 team between 2005 and 2006 along with future internationals, Anthony Annan and Harrison Afful. In 2005, he played in the WAFU Zone B tournament and scored 3 goals to helped Ghana clinch the title ahead of the ECOWAS 30th Anniversary tournament. He was adjudged Most Valuable Player and top scorer at the end of the tournament.

Between 2007 and 2008, He also played for the Ghana Olympics team, the Black Meteors. He formed a striking partnership with future Ghana captain Asamoah Gyan with duo scoring on several occasions. The duo scored three goals each during the 2008 Olympics qualifiers but failed to win their final match against Nigeria which ended in a goalless draw. Subsequently, qualified Nigeria to the 2008 Summer Olympics as group A winners after they won their final match against South Africa.

=== Senior ===
After making his full international debut for Ghana in a friendly against Togo, Tagoe was named in the final 23-man squad for the 2006 Africa Cup of Nations by Ratomir Dujković. He only played a total of 49 minutes (appearing in two games), as the team exited the tournament at the group stage.

Tagoe was selected by Milovan Rajevac as part of the final 23-man squad for the 2010 FIFA World Cup in South Africa. He played in all three group matches, as a starter, but did not feature during the knockout stage, where Ghana was eliminated by Uruguay in the quarter-finals.

== Style of play ==
Tagoe played primarily as a forward. In 2006, prior to the 2006 African Cup of Nations, Ghana coach Ratomir Dujković stated that "He is a promising player and I think he will be one of Africa's best players in the near future,". With a height of over six feet, Tagoe could be played a target man with good aerial controls and heading ability. He boosts of having speed and an outstanding vision along with an eye for goal and clinical finishing which contributed to him scoring 18 goals in the 2004-05 Ghana Premier League. These qualities and his goal-scoring prowess earned him the nickname the ''Prince of goals''.

In 2006, FIFA.com, also made reference to him being seen as the ''Prince of Darkness'' to his defenders and markers who he could outrun and punish by scoring goals due to his lanky physique and speed. Due to his speed he was mostly played as a right winger by Milovan Rajevac during the 2010 FIFA World Cup . He later on revealed that he struggled in that role and referred if he had been a backup striker to Asamoah Gyan or played in a two top striker formation along with Gyan as the duo did whilst playing for the Black Meteors, the Ghana under-23 team.

== Television, punditry ==
In March 2021, After playing outside Ghana for over 13 years, Tagoe returned to Ghana and was recruited to work as a sports television panellist along with Charles Taylor on Angel TV sports programme. In 2021, he showed his plight with new Ghana national team budget of $25 million which Ghana president Nana Addo Dankwa Akufo-Addo disclosed had been earmarked for the upcoming 2022 World Cup qualifiers and the Africa Cup of Nations tournament campaigns.

== Career statistics ==
=== Club ===
Appearances and goals by club, season and competition
Club	Season	League		National cup		League cup		Continental		Total	
Club	Season	Apps	Goals	Apps	Goals	Apps	Goals	Apps	Goals	Apps	Goals
1899 Hoffenheim	2009–10	12	2	1	1	—		—		13	3
1899 Hoffenheim	2010–11	6	0	0	0	—		—		6	0
Partizan (loan)	2010–11	15	9	3	3	—		0	0	18	12
1899 Hoffenheim	2011–12	2	0	1	0	—		—		3	0
Bursaspor	2011–12	11	1	0	0	—		0	0	11	1
Ettifaq (loan)	2012–13	8	1	0	0	—		6	0	14	1
Kelantan FA	2014	3	0	0	0	0	0	0	0	3	0
Hapoel Bnei Lod	2014–15	1	0	0	0	0	0	—		1	0
Career total		58	13	5	4	0	0	6	0	69	17

=== International ===
Appearances and goals by national team and year
National team	Year	Apps	Goals
Ghana	2006	4	0
Ghana	2007	1	0
Ghana	2008	6	2
Ghana	2009	5	2
Ghana	2010	8	1
Ghana	2011	8	2
Ghana	2012	4	0
Total		36	7

Ghana score listed first; score column indicates score after each Tagoe goal.

No.	Date	Venue	Opponent	Score	Result	Competition
1	1 June 2008	Baba Yara Stadium, Kumasi	Libya	1–0	3–0	2010 FIFA World Cup qualification
2	22 June 2008	Ohene Djan Stadium, Accra	Gabon	1–0	2–0	2010 FIFA World Cup qualification
3	11 February 2009	Cairo International Stadium, Cairo	Egypt	2–1	2–2	Friendly
4	29 March 2009	Baba Yara Stadium, Kumasi	Benin	1–0	1–0	2010 FIFA World Cup qualification
5	5 September 2010	Somhlolo National Stadium, Lobamba	Swaziland	2–0	3–0	2012 Africa Cup of Nations qualification
6	27 March 2011	Stade Alphonse Massemba-Débat, Brazzaville	Congo	1–0	3–0	2012 Africa Cup of Nations qualification
7	3 June 2011	Baba Yara Stadium, Kumasi	Congo	2–0	3–1	2012 Africa Cup of Nations qualification

== Honours ==
Hearts of Oak

- Ghana Premier League: 2004
- CAF Confederation Cup: 2004

Partizan

- Serbian SuperLiga: 2010–11
- Serbian Cup: 2010–11

Individual

- Ghana Premier League Top Scorer: 2004–05
- UAE Pro League Goal of the season: 2006–07
