= Shahin Shafiei =

Iranian footballer (born 1988)

Personal information
- Full name: Shahin Shafiei
- Date of birth: December 30, 1988 (age 37)
- Place of birth: Iran
- Height: 1.84 m (6 ft 0 in)
- Position: Midfielder

Team information
- Current team: Baadraan

Senior career*
Years	Team	Apps	(Gls)
–2009	Saba Qom		
2009–2010	Damash Gilan		
2010–2011	Gostaresh Foulad		
2011–2012	Shahin Bushehr	4	(0)
2012–2013	Yazd Louleh		
2014	Udon Thani	10	(0)
2016–2019	Oxin Alborz	58	(12)
2019–	Baadraan		(0)
- * Club domestic league appearances and goals

Shahin Shafiei (Persian: شاهین شفیعی, born December 30, 1988, in Iran) is an Iranian footballer who currently plays for Foolad in the Iran Pro League.

== See also ==
- 2008–09 Saba Qom F.C. season
- 2009–10 Damash Gilan F.C. season
- List of Iranian football transfers summer 2010
