= Mohammad Hamrang =

Iranian footballer

Personal information
- Full name: Mohammad Hamrang Vishgahi
- Date of birth: 9 March 1984 (age 42)
- Place of birth: Rasht, Iran
- Position: Defender

Team information
- Current team: Malavan
- Number: 7

Youth career
- Bargh Khoshkebijar
- Malavan

Senior career*
Years	Team	Apps	(Gls)
2001–2004	Malavan		(0)
2004–2007	Zob Ahan	58	(2)
2007–2008	Steel Azin	?	(5)
2008–2010	Saba Battery	54	(2)
2010–2012	Malavan	53	(1)
2012–	Sepidrood Rasht	0	(0)

International career
2000–2001	Iran U17	3	(0)
- * Club domestic league appearances and goals as of 22 August 2011

Mohammad Hamrang (Persian: محمد همرنگ, born 9 March 1984) is an Iranian football player of Saba Battery. He usually plays in the defender position. He was part of Iran national under-17 football team at 2001 FIFA U-17 World Championship.

== Club career ==
=== Club Career statistics ===
As of 22 August 2011

Club performance			League		Cup		Continental		Total	
Season	Club	League	Apps	Goals	Apps	Goals	Apps	Goals	Apps	Goals
Iran			League		Hazfi Cup		Asia		Total	
2004–05	Zob Ahan	Pro League	18	1			-	-		
2005–06	Zob Ahan	Pro League	21	1			-	-		
2006–07	Zob Ahan	Pro League	19	0			-	-		
2007–08	Steel Azin	Division 1		5			-	-		
2008–09	Saba Qom	Pro League	30	1			6	1		
2009–10	Saba Qom	Pro League	24	1			-	-		
2010–11	Malavan	Pro League	25	1	2	0	-	-	27	1
2011–12	Malavan	Pro League	14	0	1	1	-	-	15	1
Career total				10			6	1		

- Assist Goals

Season	Team	Assists
06–07	Zob Ahan	1
09–10	Saba	1
10–11	Malavan	0
11–12	Malavan	0
