= Fereydoon Fazli =

Iranian footballer

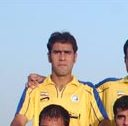

Personal information
- Full name: Fereydoon Fazli Malidarreh
- Date of birth: June 22, 1971 (age 55)
- Place of birth: Ghaemshahr, Iran
- Position: Striker

Senior career*
Years	Team	Apps	(Gls)
1988–1992	Nassaji		
1992–1996	Rah Ahan		
1996–2000	Fath Tehran		
2000–2001	Nassaji		
2001–2003	Teraktorsazi		
2003–2005	Aboumoslem	49	(21)
2005–2007	Esteghlal Ahvaz	56	(30)
2007–2010	Saba	73	(31)
2010	Gostaresh Foolad	6	(2)
2010	Esteghlal Ahvaz	8	(4)
2010–2011	Nassaji	6	(1)

International career^{‡}
2005	Iran B	6	(3)
- * Club domestic league appearances and goals as of 18 November 2011 ‡ National team caps and goals as of 18 November 2011

Fereydoon Fazli, (Persian: فريدون فضلی, born June 22, 1971) is a former professional football player who played for Nassaji Mazandaran in Azadegan League before retiring from playing football. He usually played in the striker position. He is one of the most successful strikers in the Iran Pro League.

== Club career ==
Fereydoon Fazli has been among the most successful strikers of the IPL in recent years. In season 2004/05, he was the league's second topscorer with 14 goals for Aboomoslem FC, along with Rasoul Khatibi from Sepahan and behind Esteghlal's Reza Enayati who was the topscorer with 20 goals.

Having moved to Esteghlal Ahvaz in 2005, he became the league's second topscorer again in season 2005/06 with 17 goals in 27 appearances, while the topscorer was also Reza Enayati with 21 goals. He continued his impressive performance in the 2006/2007 season with 29 full appearances for Esteghlal Ahvaz, scoring 13 goals. With all of his success in league game, he was never invited to Team Melli.

He joined Gostaresh Foolad F.C. in 2010 and was returned to Nassaji on the same year. On 18 November 2011, he was retired from playing football at the age of 40 due injury.

=== Club career statistics ===
Club performance			League		Cup		Continental		Total	
Season	Club	League	Apps	Goals	Apps	Goals	Apps	Goals	Apps	Goals
Iran			League		Hazfi Cup		Asia		Total	
2003–04	Aboomoslem	Pro League	23	7			-	-		
2004–05	Aboomoslem	Pro League	26	14			-	-		
2005–06	Esteghlal Ahvaz	Pro League	27	17			-	-		
2006–07	Esteghlal Ahvaz	Pro League	29	13	3	3	-	-	32	16
2007–08	Saba	Pro League	28	12	1	2	-	-	29	14
2008–09	Saba	Pro League	31	14	3	4	6	1	40	19
2009–10	Saba	Pro League	14	5	0	0	-	-	14	5
2010–11	Gostaresh	Division 1	6	2	0	0	-	-	6	2
2010–11	Esteghlal Ahvaz	Division 1	8	4	0	0	-	-	8	4
2011–12	Nassaji	Division 1	6	1	0	0	-	-	6	1
Total	Iran		198	92			6	1		
Career total			198	92			6	1		

- Assist Goals

Season	Team	Assists
05–06	Esteghlal Ahvaz	1
06–07	Esteghlal Ahvaz	5
07–08	Saba	4
08–09	Saba	1
09–10	Saba	3
