= Ali Al-Hawasin =

Emirati footballer (born 1979)

Personal information
- Full name: Ali Abbas Yasin; Ali Al-Hosani Al-Hawasin
- Date of birth: December 12, 1979 (age 46)
- Place of birth: UAE
- Height: 1.79 m (5 ft 10 in)
- Position: Midfielder

Senior career*
Years	Team	Apps	(Gls)
2001–2007	Al-Nasr		
2007–2010	Al-Ahli		
2010–2012	Al-Nasr	20	(1)
2012	Al- Jazira	6	(0)
2012–2013	Al-Wasl	12	(2)
2013–2015	Dhafra		

International career
2004–2007	UAE	25	(1)
- * Club domestic league appearances and goals

Ali Al-Hawasin (born December 12, 1979) is a footballer from the United Arab Emirates (UAE). He currently plays for Dhafra.
