= Salem Khamis =

Emirati footballer (born 1980)

Personal information
- Full name: Salem Khamis Faraj Alem
- Date of birth: September 19, 1980 (age 46)
- Place of birth: UAE
- Height: 1.74 m (5 ft 9 in)
- Position: Midfielder

Senior career*
| Years | Team | Apps | (Gls) |
| 1999–2010 | Al-Ahli | | |
| 2010–2012 | Al-Nasr | 32 | (2) |
| 2012–2015 | Al-Sharjah | | |
| 2015–2016 | Ajman | | |
| 2016–2017 | Al-Arabi | | |
| 2017–2019 | Masfut | | |

International career
| 2002–2008 | UAE | 21 | (2) |
- * Club domestic league appearances and goals

Salem Khamis Faraj Alem (born September 19, 1980) is an Emirati football player who currently plays as a midfielder for the United Arab Emirates national team.
