= Hicham Aboucherouane =

Moroccan footballer (born 1981)

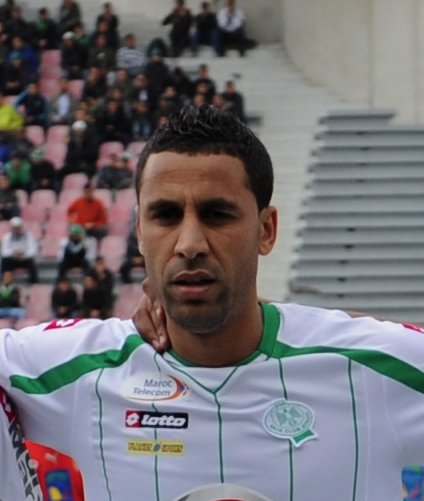
- Aboucherouane in 2011

Personal information
- Full name: Hicham Aboucherouane
- Date of birth: 2 April 1981 (age 45)
- Place of birth: Laaounate, El Jadida, Morocco
- Height: 1.83 m (6 ft 0 in)
- Position: Winger

Youth career
- 1997–1999: Najm El Aounat

Senior career*
Years	Team	Apps	(Gls)
1999–2004	Raja Casablanca	115	(65)
2004	Al-Nassr	3	(2)
2004–2007	Raja Casablanca	37	(22)
2005–2006	→ Lille (loan)	16	(2)
2007–2008	Espérance	32	(10)
2008–2010	Al-Ittihad	63	(29)
2010–2011	Raja Casablanca	21	(3)
2011–2012	Al Ahli	25	(8)
Total		312	(141)

International career
2002–2009	Morocco	27	(5)
- * Club domestic league appearances and goals

Hicham Aboucherouane (Arabic: هشام بوشروان; born 2 April 1981) is a Moroccan former professional footballer who played as a winger.

He began his career 1997 with Najm El Aounat, 1999 was transferred to Raja Casablanca. He was loaned out to Lille in July 2005. In January 2007, he moved from Raja Casablanca to Espérance and then he was transferred in July 2008 to Al-Ittihad.

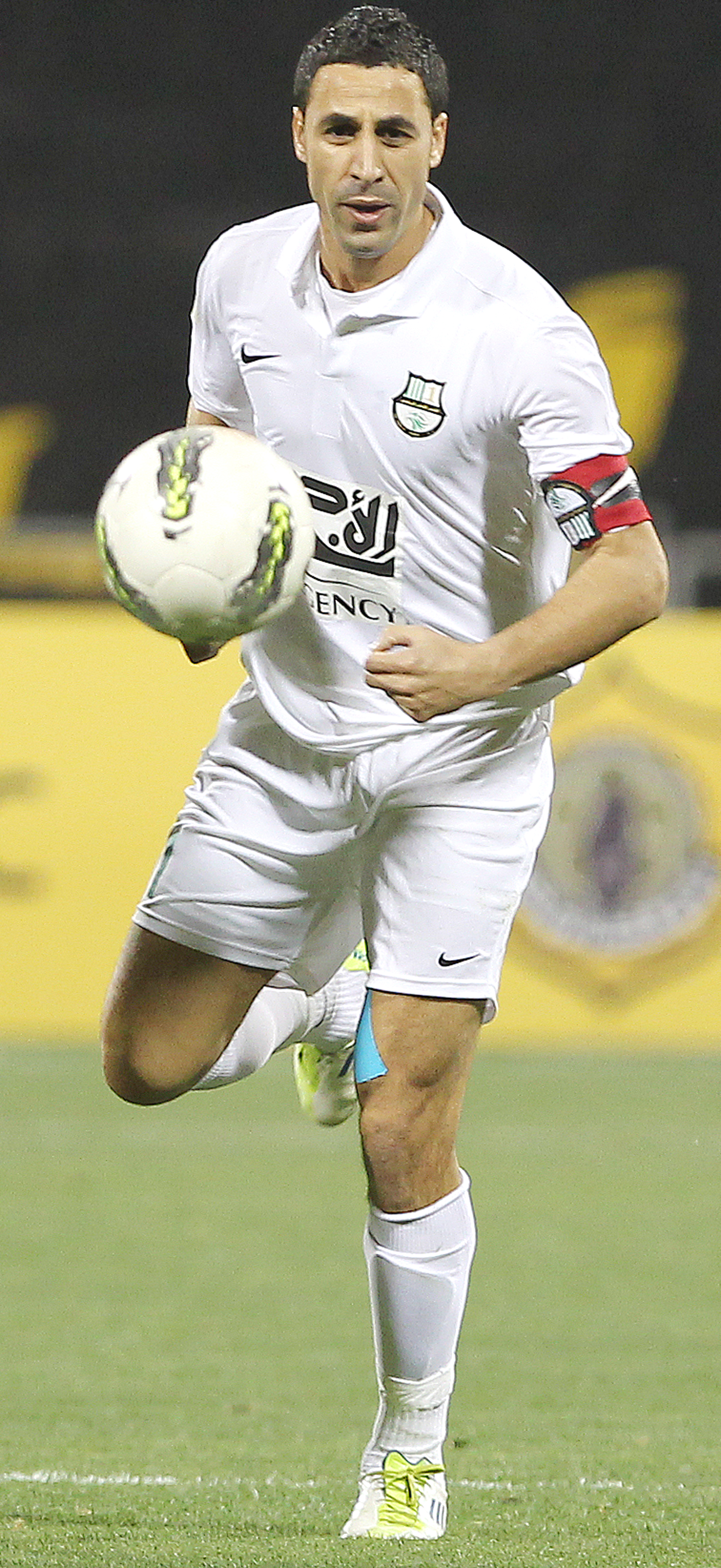
Aboucherouane with Al Ahli Doha in 2012.
