= Renatinho (footballer, born 1987) =

Brazilian footballer

Personal information
- Full name: Renato Carlos Martins Júnior
- Date of birth: 14 May 1987 (age 39)
- Place of birth: São Vicente, Brazil
- Height: 1.73 m (5 ft 8 in)
- Position: Winger

Youth career
- 2003–2006: Santos

Senior career*
Years	Team	Apps	(Gls)
2006–2008	Santos	42	(6)
2008–2011	Rentistas	0	(0)
2008–2010	→ Kawasaki Frontale (loan)	56	(21)
2010	→ Portimonense (loan)	5	(1)
2011	→ São Caetano (loan)	6	(0)
2012	→ Hangzhou Greentown (loan)	25	(8)
2013–2014	→ Portimonense (loan)	2	(0)
2014	Santo André	1	(0)
2015	Chiangrai United	26	(3)
2016	Skenderbeu	12	(2)
2016–2017	Varzim	11	(2)
2017–2019	Vonds Ichihara		
2020	Anapolina	3	(1)
2020	Brasiliense	6	(0)
2021	Linense	0	(0)
2021	Uttaradit	0	(0)
- * Club domestic league appearances and goals as of 00:22, 4 September 2021 (UTC)

Renato Carlos Martins Júnior (born 14 May 1987), commonly known as Renatinho, is a Brazilian footballer who plays as a right winger.

He was linked with Sporting during 2008 summer transfer window. However, he joined Japanese club Kawasaki Frontale in August 2008.

== Club statistics ==
Club performance			League		Cup		League Cup		Continental		Total	
Season	Club	League	Apps	Goals	Apps	Goals	Apps	Goals	Apps	Goals	Apps	Goals
Japan			League		Emperor's Cup		J.League Cup		Asia		Total	
2008	Kawasaki Frontale	J1 League	12	5	2	1	0	0	–		14	6
2009	Kawasaki Frontale	J1 League	29	9	4	2	5	1	9	5	47	17
2010	Kawasaki Frontale	J1 League	15	7	0	0	0	0	6	2	21	9
China PR			League		FA Cup		League Cup		Asia		Total	
2012	Hangzhou Greentown	Chinese Super League	25	8	1	0	–		–		26	8
Country	Japan		56	21	6	3	5	1	15	7	82	32
Country	China PR		25	8	1	0	0	0	0	0	26	8
Total			78	29	6	3	5	1	15	7	108	40

== Honours ==
- São Paulo State League Sub-17: 2004
- São Paulo State League: 2006 & 2007
