= Tarik El Taib =

Libyan footballer (born 1977)

Tariq Al Taib طَارِق التَّائِب
Personal information
- Full name: Tariq Ibrahim Mohammad Al Taib
- Date of birth: 28 February 1977 (age 49)
- Place of birth: Tripoli, Libya
- Height: 1.76 m (5 ft 9 1/2 in)
- Position: Midfielder

Youth career
- 1992–1994: Al Ahli Tripoli
- 1995: Juventus

Senior career*
Years	Team	Apps	(Gls)
1995–2001	Al Ahli Tripoli	26	(11)
1996–1997	→ Beira-Mar (loan)		
2001–2004	CS Sfaxien	65	(37)
2004–2006	Gaziantepspor	47	(5)
2006–2009	Al Hilal	45	(11)
2009–2010	Al Shabab	10	(3)
2010–2011	Al Ahli Tripoli		
2011–2012	Al-Nasr Kuwait	13	(4)
2012–2013	Misr Lel-Makkasa	0	(0)
2013–2014	Suwaiq Club		
2014	Muaither SC		
2016	Al Ahli Tripoli		

International career^{‡}
1998–2011	Libya	77	(23)
- * Club domestic league appearances and goals as of 28 December 2009 ‡ National team caps and goals as of 28 December 2009

Tarek Ibrahim Mohammad Al Taib (Arabic: طَارِق إِبْرَاهِيم مُحَمَّد التَّائِب; born 28 February 1977) is a Libyan football midfielder.

== Club career ==
Al-Taib began his career in Libya with Al Ahli Tripoli. In his first year, he played 26 matches and scored 11 goals, coming third in the 1997–1998 Libyan Player of the Year award. He then went on to win the award five times in 1999, 2000, 2002, 2003 and 2005. On 6 September 2013, he signed a one-year contract with Oman Professional League club Al-Suwaiq Club. El Taib played professionally in Turkey and Tunisia.

== Offers ==
In 1995, a scout sent from Juventus went to Libya to search for young potential, he chose Tariq Al Taib and he went with him to Italy and trained with Juventus for a month. Juventus were impressed and decided to buy him, but the Libyan Football Federation did not grant him a license to play in Italy. In 2000, he went to West Ham United and played with them in a friendly match against Arsenal which ended with Arsenal winning 2–1, in which Tariq Al Taib scored West Ham's goal. Arsenal were interested in buying him but again, he was unable to get a license to play in England. In 2003, after a friendly match against Argentina, in which Tariq Al Taib put in a strong performance and scored a remarkable goal, receiving a pass from a team-mate near the corner post, running down the wing past two players and then scoring at nearly a 180-degree angle. He then received an offer from the Spanish club Valencia but the Libyan authorities restricted his potential career at the highest level.

== International career ==
El Taib captained the side during the 2006 World Cup Qualifiers and the African Nations Cup. He was Libya's captain during the 2012 Africa Cup of Nations qualifiers, but was exiled from the side after he spoke out against teammates who supported rebel groups fighting in the First Libyan Civil War in 2011.

El Taib scored 23 goals in 78 appearances for Libya.

In the Championship Manager video game, his name was rendered as "Tarek Ettayeb".

== Career statistics ==
=== Club ===
Club	Season	League			Al Hilal			ACL			Total		
Club	Season	Apps	Goals	Assists	Apps	Goals	Assists	Apps	Goals	Assists	Apps	Goals	Assists
Al Hilal	2006–07	14	4	4	5	2	4	4	0	2	23	6	10
Al Hilal	2007–08	18	7	9	10	4	5	1	1	0	29	12	14
Al Hilal	2008–09	8	0	5	6	0	0	4	2	2	18	2	7
Career total		40	11	18	21	6	9	9	3	4	70	20	31

== Honours ==
=== Club ===
CS Sfax

- Arab Champions League (1): 2003–04

Al Hilal

- Saudi Professional League (1): 2007–08
- Crown Prince Cup (2): 2007–08, 2008–09
