= List of Saudi Pro League hat-tricks =

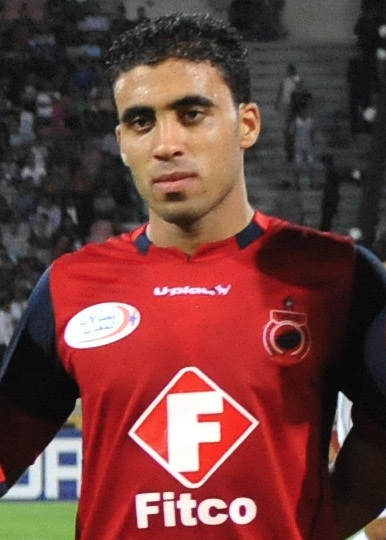
Abderrazak Hamdallah holds the record for the most hat-tricks, with eleven.

The Saudi Pro League, Premier League, and Categorization League are the highest level of professional football played in Saudi Arabia. Since their creation, many players have scored three goals (hat-trick) in a single match in the league.

== Hat-tricks ==
Key
^{4}	Player scored four goals
^{5}	Player scored five goals
^{6}	Player scored six goals
*	The home team

Saudi Pro League hat-tricks by player
Player	Nationality	For	Against	Result	Date	Ref.
Mohammad S. Abdeli	Saudi Arabia	Al-Nassr	Al-Hilal*	3–3	24 February 1977	
Amin Dabo	Saudi Arabia	Al-Ahli	Al-Riyadh*	3–0	8 March 1977	
Dé Aranha	Brazil	Al-Hilal*	Al-Riyadh	5–0	23 October 1980	
Majed Abdullah	Saudi Arabia	Al-Nassr	Al-Jabalain*	4–0	17 November 1980	
Sameer Sultan	Saudi Arabia	Al-Hilal*	Al-Nahda	4–0	18 November 1980	
Témime Lahzami	Tunisia	Al-Ittihad*	Al-Jabalain	4–0	20 November 1980	
Néjib Limam	Tunisia	Al-Hilal	Al-Nassr*	3–2	28 November 1980	
Majed Abdullah	Saudi Arabia	Al-Nassr*	Al-Ahli	5–1	26 December 1980	
Fathi Chebel	Algeria	Al-Riyadh*	Al-Jabalain	4–1	23 January 1981	
Darwish Saeed	Saudi Arabia	Al-Nassr*	Al-Riyadh	5–0	30 January 1981	
Mansour Bashir	Saudi Arabia	Al-Hilal*	Al-Rawdhah	4–1	23 December 1982	
Talal Sobhi	Saudi Arabia	Al-Ahli*	Ohod	4–2	18 February 1983	
Majed Abdullah	Saudi Arabia	Al-Nassr	Ohod*	3–0	4 March 1983	
Hussam Abo Dawood	Saudi Arabia	Al-Ahli	Al-Ittihad*	5–2	7 April 1983	
Abdullah Ghurab	Saudi Arabia	Al-Ittihad	Al Qadsiah*	3–2	2 December 1983	
Hussam Abo Dawood	Saudi Arabia	Al-Ahli	Al-Hilal*	3–0	23 December 1983	
Abdulrahman Dawood	Saudi Arabia	Al-Wehda	Al-Riyadh*	4–1	19 January 1984	
Ahmed Bahja^{4}	Morocco	Al-Ittihad	Al-Shabab*	4–2	22 May 1997	
Obeid Al-Dosari	Saudi Arabia	Al-Wehda*	Al-Ittihad	3–2	2 December 1998	
Saoud Al-Qanat	Saudi Arabia	Al Shabab*	Al-Wehda	6–0	9 December 1998	
Sami Al-Jaber	Saudi Arabia	Al-Hilal*	Al-Shabab	3–2	4 January 1999	
Ibrahim Suwayed	Saudi Arabia	Al-Ahli*	Al-Ansar	4–1	6 January 1999	
Rashidi Yekini	Nigeria	Al-Shabab*	Al-Ansar	3–0	17 February 1999	
Nawwaf al-Sa'adoun	Saudi Arabia	Al-Ittihad*	Hajer	4–1	7 March 1999	
Ibrahim Suwayed	Saudi Arabia	Al-Ahli*	Al-Najma	6–0	20 October 1999	
Hamzah Idris	Saudi Arabia	Al-Ittihad*	Al-Najma	5–1	5 November 1999	
Sulaiman Al Hadaithi	Saudi Arabia	Al-Ittihad*	Al-Tai	5–1	12 November 1999	
Talal Al-Meshal	Saudi Arabia	Al-Ahli	Al-Wehda*	5–1	26 November 1999	
Hamzah Idris	Saudi Arabia	Al-Ittihad*	Al-Ettifaq	3–1	22 December 1999	
Talal Al-Meshal	Saudi Arabia	Al-Ahli	Al-Tai*	6–0	30 December 1999	
Al-Hasan Al-Yami	Saudi Arabia	Al-Ittihad	Al-Raed*	5–0	14 January 2000	
Obeid Al-Dosari	Saudi Arabia	Al-Wehda*	Al-Raed	4–2	19 January 2000	
Fuad Anwar	Saudi Arabia	Al-Nassr	Al-Najma*	3–0	11 February 2000	
Khaled Qahwaji	Saudi Arabia	Al-Ahli*	Al-Raed	5–0	11 February 2000	
Toninho Sergio Reinaldo	Brazil	Al-Hilal*	Al-Ittihad	4–2	2 March 2000	
Eduardo Kato	Brazil	Al-Ahli*	Al-Tai	6–0	12 March 2000	
Hamzah Idris^{6}	Saudi Arabia	Al-Ittihad	Al-Wehda*	8–0	27 March 2000	
Ricardo El-Kato	Brazil	Al-Hilal	Al-Riyadh*	6–1	2 March 2001	
Sérgio Ricardo	Brazil	Al-Ittihad*	Al-Ahli	4–2	25 April 2001	
Sérgio Ricardo	Brazil	Al-Ittihad*	Al Ansar	5–2	19 November 2001	
Edmilson	Brazil	Al-Hilal	Al-Ittihad*	4–0	19 December 2001	
Ma'amoun Diop	Senegal	Al-Riyadh*	Al-Wehda	3–1	12 February 2002	
Hamzah Idris	Saudi Arabia	Al-Ittihad*	Al-Riyadh	10–3	6 March 2002	
Abdul Rahman Sifeen^{4}	Saudi Arabia	Al-Wehda*	Al-Najma	4–4	14 March 2002	
Badr Al-Rashed	Saudi Arabia	Al-Tai	Al-Ansar*	7–0	20 March 2002	
Sérgio Ricardo	Brazil	Al-Ittihad*	Al-Ahli	4–1	8 April 2002	
Nawaf Al-Dajani	Saudi Arabia	Al-Shoulla	Al-Raed*	4–0	13 November 2002	
Marzouk Al-Otaibi	Saudi Arabia	Al-Ittihad	Al-Nassr*	4–2	21 November 2002	
Hussain Al-Ali	Saudi Arabia	Al-Hilal*	Al-Ittihad	3–1	11 December 2002	
Abdulaziz Al-Saran	Saudi Arabia	Al-Shabab	Al-Najma*	1–3	1 January 2003	
Carlos Tenorio	Ecuador	Al-Nassr*	Al-Tai	4–1	15 January 2003	
Carlos Tenorio^{5}	Ecuador	Al-Najma*	Al-Nassr	6–0	23 January 2003	
Mohamed Barakat	Egypt	Al-Ahli*	Al-Raed	5–0	27 February 2003	
Abdulaziz Al-Saran	Saudi Arabia	Al-Shabab*	Al-Raed	3–1	10 April 2003	
Richard Manga	Senegal	Al-Shabab*	Al-Tai	7–0	28 August 2003	
Guilherme Alves	Brazil	Al-Ittihad	Al-Tai*	3–0	26 September 2003	
Majed Al-Hazzani	Saudi Arabia	Al-Wehda	Al-Khaleej*	6–4	19 October 2003	
Yasser Al-Qahtani	Saudi Arabia	Al-Qadsiah*	Al-Shoulla	4–0	20 October 2003	
Marzouk Al-Otaibi	Saudi Arabia	Al-Ittihad*	Al-Riyadh	3–0	15 January 2004	
Kandia Traoré	Ivory Coast	Al-Hilal*	Al-Shoulla	6–0	9 February 2004	
Jatto Ceesay	Gambia	Al-Hilal*	Al-Shoulla	6–0	9 February 2004	
Carlos Ruggiero	Italy	Al-Ahli	Al-Hilal*	5–1	23 May 2004	
Richard Manga	Senegal	Al-Shabab*	Al-Ansar	4–0	28 August 2004	
Jose Rogeiro Pereira	Brazil	Al-Ahli	Ohod*	5–0	1 October 2004	
Jose Rogeiro Pereira	Brazil	Al-Ahli*	Al-Ansar	6–1	19 November 2004	
Godwin Attram	Ghana	Al-Shabab	Al-Ansar*	6–3	6 January 2005	
Sérgio Ricardo	Brazil	Al-Ittihad	Al-Riyadh*	4–1	20 March 2005	
Ala Al-Kuwaikabi^{4}	Saudi Arabia	Al-Wehda*	Ohod	5–0	12 May 2005	
Patrick Kazadi	DR Congo	Al-Wehda*	Al-Qadsiah	3–2	31 May 2005	
Essa Al-Mehyani^{4}	Saudi Arabia	Al-Wehda	Abha*	7–1	12 October 2005	
Essa Al-Mehyani	Saudi Arabia	Al-Wehda	Al-Ansar*	3–1	22 October 2005	
Essa Al-Mehyani	Saudi Arabia	Al-Wehda*	Al-Tai	3–1	11 November 2005	
Saleh Bashir	Saudi Arabia	Al-Ettifaq	Al-Hazem*	3–1	14 January 2006	
Mouhamed Al Arousi	Morocco	Al-Tai*	Al-Ittihad	3–4	20 February 2006	
Essa Al-Mehyani	Saudi Arabia	Al-Wehda*	Al-Nassr	3–2	26 February 2006	
Mohamed Kallon	Sierra Leone	Al-Ittihad*	Al-Ansar	5–2	13 March 2006	
Diane Popovich^{4}	FR Yugoslavia	Al-Ahli*	Abha	7–1	17 March 2006	
Yousef Al-Salem	Saudi Arabia	Al-Qadsiah	Al-Tai*	3–3	5 October 2006	
Khalid Suaihlee	France	Al-Ettifaq	Al-Khaleej*	5–2	26 October 2006	
Godwin Attram	Ghana	Al Shabab*	Al-Ittihad	3–1	8 December 2006	
Alhassane Keita	Guinea	Al-Ittihad	Al-Khaleej*	8–2	8 March 2007	
Castelo	Colombia	Al-Khaleej	Al Faisaly*	4–1	16 March 2007	
Naji Majrashi	Saudi Arabia	Al-Shabab	Al-Ahli*	1–5	15 April 2007	
Tarik El Taib	Libya	Al-Hilal*	Al-Watani	5–0	23 August 2007	
Robert de Pinho de Souza	Brazil	Al-Ittihad*	Al-Tai	5–2	30 September 2007	
Yasser Al-Qahtani	Saudi Arabia	Al-Hilal	Al-Qadsiah*	4–2	18 October 2007	
Nasser Al-Shamrani	Saudi Arabia	Al-Shabab*	Al-Qadsiah	5–2	5 November 2007	
Magno Alves^{4}	Brazil	Al-Ittihad*	Al-Nassr	4–0	3 January 2008	
Val Baiano	Brazil	Al-Ahli*	Najran	4–0	7 January 2008	
Al-Hasan Al-Yami^{4}	Saudi Arabia	Najran*	Al-Nassr	5–4	13 March 2008	
Nasser Al-Shamrani^{5}	Saudi Arabia	Al-Shabab*	Al-Watani	6–0	13 April 2008	
Nei^{4}	Brazil	Al-Shabab*	Al-Wehda	4–2	4 October 2008	
Nasser Al-Shamrani	Saudi Arabia	Al-Shabab*	Abha	5–0	4 December 2008	
Hicham Aboucherouane	Morocco	Al-Ittihad*	Al-Watani	7–2	15 December 2008	
Yasser Al-Qahtani^{4}	Saudi Arabia	Al-Hilal*	Najran	7–0	20 December 2008	
Flávio Amado	Angola	Al-Shabab	Najran*	3–1	19 August 2009	
Naif Hazazi	Saudi Arabia	Al-Ittihad*	Al-Qadsiah	7–1	26 August 2009	
Thiago Neves	Brazil	Al-Hilal*	Al-Ittihad	5–0	10 December 2009	
Hicham Aboucherouane	Morocco	Al-Ittihad*	Al-Hazem	5–2	6 January 2010	
Muhannad Assiri	Saudi Arabia	Al-Wehda	Najran*	5–0	7 January 2010	
Abdelkarim Benhenia^{4}	Morocco	Al-Wehda	Al-Fateh*	6–0	28 January 2010	
Yasser Al-Qahtani	Saudi Arabia	Al-Hilal*	Al-Faisaly	5–1	25 August 2010	
Naif Hazazi	Saudi Arabia	Al-Ittihad*	Al-Hazem	4–0	29 August 2010	
Nasser Al-Shamrani	Saudi Arabia	Al-Shabab*	Al-Faisaly	4–1	11 November 2010	
Yasser Al-Qahtani	Saudi Arabia	Al-Hilal*	Al-Hazem	3–0	15 December 2010	
Migen Memelli	Albania	Al-Faisaly	Al-Ittihad*	3–3	16 December 2010	
Mukhtar Fallatah^{4}	Saudi Arabia	Al-Wehda*	Al-Hazem	8–1	24 February 2011	
Muhannad Assiri	Saudi Arabia	Al-Wehda*	Al-Hazem	8–1	24 February 2011	
Yousef Al-Salem	Saudi Arabia	Al-Ettifaq	Najran*	4–2	25 February 2011	
Alhassane Keita	Guinea	Al-Shabab	Al-Hazem*	4–0	1 April 2011	
Victor Simões	Brazil	Al-Ahli	Al Qadsiah*	3–1	2 April 2011	
Nasigba John-Jumbo	Nigeria	Al Qadsiah	Al-Raed*	4–1	22 April 2011	
Hadj Bouguèche	Algeria	Al-Qadsiah	Al-Fateh*	6–1	14 October 2011	
Victor Simões	Brazil	Al-Ahli*	Al-Taawoun	4–2	15 October 2011	
Youssef El-Arabi	Morocco	Al-Hilal	Al-Qadsiah*	5–4	20 October 2011	
Wendel Geraldo	Brazil	Al-Ittihad	Al-Qadsiah*	8–0	2 November 2011	
Victor Simões	Brazil	Al-Ahli*	Al-Ansar	5–1	29 December 2011	
Nasser Al-Shamrani	Saudi Arabia	Al-Shabab*	Al-Ansar	3–0	8 April 2012	
Sebastián Tagliabué	Argentina	Al-Shabab	Al-Faisaly*	3–1	7 August 2012	
Wesley	Brazil	Al-Hilal	Najran*	6–0	23 August 2012	
Yasser Al-Qahtani	Saudi Arabia	Al-Hilal*	Al-Raed	6–0	28 September 2012	
Victor Simões	Brazil	Al-Ahli	Al-Shoulla*	3–1	4 December 2012	
Zamil Al-Sulim	Saudi Arabia	Al-Ettifaq	Hajer*	3–2	8 March 2013	
Mukhtar Fallatah^{4}	Saudi Arabia	Al-Ittihad	Al-Shabab*	4–1	26 August 2013	
Mukhtar Fallatah	Saudi Arabia	Al-Ittihad	Al-Raed*	4–1	25 November 2013	
Thiago Neves	Brazil	Al-Hilal*	Al-Ettifaq	5–1	28 December 2013	
Jandson	Brazil	Najran*	Al-Nahda	5–1	25 January 2014	
Mohammad Al-Sahlawi	Saudi Arabia	Al-Nassr*	Al-Faisaly	4–0	7 February 2014	
Luís Leal	São Tomé and Príncipe	Al-Ahli*	Al-Fateh	4–0	14 February 2014	
Élton Brandão	Brazil	Al-Nassr*	Al-Ittihad	3–1	23 March 2014	
Nasser Al-Shamrani^{4}	Saudi Arabia	Al-Hilal*	Al-Nahda	6–0	28 March 2014	
Omar Al Somah	Syria	Al-Ahli*	Hajer	6–1	16 August 2014	
Paul Alo'o	Cameroon	Al-Taawoun*	Al-Ittihad	4–3	5 December 2014	
Marquinho	Brazil	Al-Ittihad	Al-Taawoun*	3–4	5 December 2014	
Abdulrahman Al-Ghamdi	Saudi Arabia	Al-Ittihad	Al-Faisaly*	3–0	12 February 2015	
Mukhtar Fallatah	Saudi Arabia	Al-Ittihad*	Al-Raed	3–1	15 March 2015	
Omar Al Somah	Syria	Al-Ahli	Al-Nassr*	4–3	22 March 2015	
Gelmin Rivas	Venezuela	Al-Ittihad	Al-Qadsiah*	3–1	17 October 2015	
Omar Al Somah	Syria	Al-Ahli*	Al-Nassr	4–2	18 October 2015	
Gelmin Rivas	Venezuela	Al-Ittihad*	Hajer	5–0	10 December 2015	
Omar Al Somah	Syria	Al-Ahli*	Al-Raed	3–1	14 December 2015	
Yasser Al-Qahtani^{4}	Saudi Arabia	Al-Hilal*	Hajer	4–1	8 May 2016	
Omar Al Somah	Syria	Al-Ahli	Al-Raed*	5–2	8 May 2016	
Mansor Hamzi	Saudi Arabia	Al-Faisaly*	Al-Khaleej	3–1	12 August 2016	
Kahraba^{4}	Egypt	Al-Ittihad	Al-Wehda*	5–3	18 September 2016	
Mohamed Benyettou	Algeria	Al-Shabab*	Al-Ahli	3–2	18 September 2016	
Mukhtar Fallatah	Saudi Arabia	Al-Wehda*	Al-Batin	5–1	29 October 2016	
Omar Al Somah^{4}	Syria	Al-Ahli*	Al-Khaleej	4–1	29 October 2016	
Jandson	Brazil	Al-Khaleej*	Al-Wehda	4–2	14 April 2017	
Omar Kharbin	Syria	Al-Hilal*	Al-Nassr	5–1	4 May 2017	
Mostafa Fathi	Egypt	Al-Taawoun*	Al-Fayha	4–0	29 December 2017	
Ahmed Musa	Nigeria	Al-Nassr	Al-Qadsiah*	3–0	19 September 2018	
Cristian Guanca	Argentina	Al-Ettifaq*	Al-Fayha	3–0	21 September 2018	
Mohammed Al-Saiari	Saudi Arabia	Al-Hazem	Ohod*	3–3	8 November 2018	
Abderrazak Hamdallah^{4}	Morocco	Al-Nassr*	Al-Raed	4–0	14 December 2018	
Léandre Tawamba	Cameroon	Al-Taawoun*	Al-Fayha	3–0	14 December 2018	
Omar Al Somah	Syria	Al-Ahli	Al-Hilal*	3–4	21 December 2018	
Djaniny^{5}	Cape Verde	Al-Ahli*	Ohod	5–1	11 January 2019	
Abdulfattah Adam	Saudi Arabia	Al-Taawoun*	Ohod	4–0	14 February 2019	
Léandre Tawamba	Cameroon	Al-Taawoun*	Al-Ettifaq	4–1	28 February 2019	
Abderrazak Hamdallah^{4}	Morocco	Al-Nassr	Al-Wehda*	4–0	16 March 2019	
Saleh Al-Shehri^{4}	Saudi Arabia	Al-Raed	Al-Ahli*	5–4	28 March 2019	
Abderrazak Hamdallah	Morocco	Al-Nassr	Al-Raed*	5–0	4 April 2019	
Saleh Al-Shehri	Saudi Arabia	Al-Raed*	Ohod	5–1	19 April 2019	
Abderrazak Hamdallah	Morocco	Al-Nassr	Al-Hazem*	3–0	11 May 2019	
Aleksandar Prijović	Serbia	Al-Ittihad*	Al-Fateh	6–2	11 May 2019	
Djaniny	Cape Verde	Al-Ahli*	Al-Ettifaq	5–0	16 May 2019	
Ronnie Fernández	Chile	Al-Fayha*	Al-Ittihad	4–1	19 December 2019	
Abderrazak Hamdallah	Morocco	Al-Nassr	Al-Fayha*	4–1	28 December 2019	
Bafétimbi Gomis	France	Al-Hilal*	Al-Adalah	7–0	30 December 2019	
Abderrazak Hamdallah	Morocco	Al-Nassr	Al-Shabab*	4–2	14 February 2020	
Abderrazak Hamdallah	Morocco	Al-Nassr	Al-Taawoun*	4–1	20 August 2020	
Bafétimbi Gomis	France	Al-Hilal*	Al-Hazem	4–1	29 August 2020	
Omar Al Somah	Syria	Al-Ahli	Al-Ain*	4–3	7 November 2020	
Dimitri Petratos	Australia	Al-Wehda*	Al-Batin	3–2	29 November 2020	
Carlos Strandberg	Sweden	Abha	Al-Ain*	4–2	1 January 2021	
Léandre Tawamba	Cameroon	Al-Taawoun*	Damac	3–1	25 January 2021	
Karim El Berkaoui^{4}	Morocco	Al-Raed*	Damac	4–2	31 January 2021	
Bafétimbi Gomis^{4}	France	Al-Hilal	Al-Ain*	5–0	9 February 2021	
Youssouf Niakaté	France	Al-Wehda	Al-Faisaly*	4–2	12 February 2021	
Mitchell te Vrede	Netherlands	Al-Fateh*	Al-Ain	3–2	13 February 2021	
Abdullah Al-Mogren	Saudi Arabia	Al-Raed*	Al-Ain	4–0	28 February 2021	
Aleksandar Prijović	Serbia	Al-Ittihad	Al-Qadsiah*	4–1	28 February 2021	
Romarinho	Brazil	Al-Ittihad*	Al-Wehda	4–2	5 March 2021	
Bafétimbi Gomis	France	Al-Hilal	Al-Wehda*	4–2	11 March 2021	
Farouk Chafaï	Algeria	Damac	Abha*	4–3	21 March 2021	
Danilo Asprilla	Colombia	Al-Qadsiah	Al-Ettifaq*	3–1	10 April 2021	
Abderrazak Hamdallah	Morocco	Al-Ittihad	Al-Ahli*	4–3	26 February 2022	
Odion Ighalo	Nigeria	Al-Hilal*	Al-Ahli	4–2	18 March 2022	
Firas Al-Buraikan	Saudi Arabia	Al-Fateh	Damac*	3–0	29 May 2022	
Knowledge Musona	Zimbabwe	Al-Tai*	Al-Khaleej	3–0	6 October 2022	
Talisca	Brazil	Al-Nassr	Al-Raed*	4–1	16 December 2022	
Cristiano Ronaldo^{4}	Portugal	Al-Nassr	Al-Wehda*	4–0	9 February 2023	
Cristiano Ronaldo	Portugal	Al-Nassr	Damac*	3–0	25 February 2023	
Abderrazak Hamdallah	Morocco	Al-Ittihad	Al-Fateh*	5–1	18 March 2023	
Karim El Berkaoui	Morocco	Al-Raed*	Al-Batin	3–1	2 May 2023	
Mohamed Fouzair	Morocco	Al-Raed*	Damac	5–0	15 May 2023	
Aaron Boupendza^{4}	Gabon	Al-Shabab	Damac*	4–1	31 May 2023	
Roberto Firmino	Brazil	Al-Ahli*	Al-Hazem	3–1	11 August 2023	
Malcom	Brazil	Al Hilal	Abha*	3–1	14 August 2023	
Cristiano Ronaldo	Portugal	Al-Nassr	Al-Fateh*	5–0	25 August 2023	
Aleksander Mitrovic	Serbia	Al-Hilal	Al-Ittihad*	4–3	1 September 2023	
Odion Ighalo	Nigeria	Al-Wehda*	Damac	4–2	14 September 2023	
Bernard Mensah	Ghana	Al-Tai	Al-Ettifaq*	3–4	21 September 2023	
Cristian Tello	Spain	Al-Fateh*	Al-Wehda	5–1	30 September 2023	
Karim Benzema	France	Al-Ittihad*	Abha	4–2	10 November 2023	
Malcom	Brazil	Al-Hilal	Al Hazem*	9–0	25 November 2023	
Odion Ighalo	Nigeria	Al-Wehda*	Al-Khaleej	3–1	25 November 2023	
Georges-Kévin Nkoudou	Cameroon	Damac*	Abha	4–2	25 November 2023	
Sergej Milinković-Savić	Serbia	Al-Hilal*	Abha	7–0	21 December 2023	
Talisca	Brazil	Al-Nassr*	Al-Hazem	4–4	29 February 2024	
Cristiano Ronaldo	Portugal	Al-Nassr*	Al-Tai	5–1	30 March 2024	
Cristiano Ronaldo	Portugal	Al-Nassr	Abha*	8–0	2 April 2024	
Cristiano Ronaldo	Portugal	Al-Nassr*	Al-Wehda	6–0	4 May 2024	
Karl Toko Ekambi	Cameroon	Al-Ettifaq	Al-Ittihad*	5–0	10 May 2024	
Karim Benzema	France	Al-Ittihad*	Al-Wehda	7–1	15 September 2024	
Marcos Leonardo	Brazil	Al-Hilal*	Al-Fateh	9–0	16 January 2025	
Abderrazak Hamdallah	Morocco	Al-Shabab*	Al-Khaleej	5–1	6 February 2025	
Ivan Toney	England	Al-Ahli	Al-Hilal*	3–2	28 February 2025	
Abderrazak Hamdallah	Morocco	Al-Shabab*	Al-Orobah	6–0	13 March 2025	
Omar Al Somah	Syria	Al-Orobah	Al-Riyadh*	4–2	1 May 2025	
Salem Al-Dawsari	Saudi Arabia	Al-Hilal	Al-Raed*	5–3	8 May 2025	
Sadio Mané^{4}	Senegal	Al-Nassr	Al-Okhdood*	9–0	12 May 2025	
João Félix	Portugal	Al-Nassr	Al-Taawoun*	5–0	29 August 2025	
Karim Benzema	France	Al-Ittihad	Al-Okhdood*	5–2	30 August 2025	
João Félix	Portugal	Al-Nassr*	Al-Fateh	5–1	18 October 2025	
Joshua King	Norway	Al-Khaleej*	Al-Riyadh	4–1	19 October 2025	
Julián Quiñones	Mexico	Al-Qadsiah	Neom*	3–1	19 October 2025	
Roger Martínez	Colombia	Al-Taawoun	Al-Fateh*	5–2	6 November 2025	
Karim Benzema	France	Al-Ittihad	Al-Kholood*	4–0	9 January 2026	
Julián Quiñones	Mexico	Al-Qadsiah*	Al-Fayha	5–0	14 January 2026	
Roger Martínez	Colombia	Al-Taawoun	Al-Riyadh*	3–1	18 January 2026	
Ivan Toney	England	Al-Ahli*	Al-Khaleej	4–1	20 January 2026	
Ivan Toney	England	Al-Ahli*	Al-Ettifaq	4–0	28 January 2026	
Carlos	Brazil	Al-Shabab	Al-Hazem*	4–0	29 January 2026	
Karim Benzema	France	Al-Hilal	Al-Okhdood*	6–0	5 February 2026	
Ivan Toney	England	Al-Ahli*	Al-Najma	4–1	19 February 2026	
Julián Quiñones	Mexico	Al-Qadsiah	Al-Okhdood*	4–2	20 February 2026	
Karim Benzema	France	Al-Hilal*	Al-Kholood	6–0	8 April 2026	
Ivan Toney	England	Al-Ahli*	Al-Fateh	3–1	6 May 2026	
João Félix	Portugal	Al-Nassr	Al-Shabab*	4–2	7 May 2026	
Julián Quiñones	Mexico	Al-Qadsiah	Al-Ittihad*	5–1	21 May 2026	
Moussa Dembélé	France	Al-Ettifaq*	Al-Riyadh	4–2	14 August 2026	
Ivan Toney	England	Al-Ahli*	Abha	4–0	22 August 2026	
Steven Bergwijn	Netherlands	Al-Ittihad*	Al-Hazem	3–2	24 August 2026	
Gabriel Martinelli	Brazil	Al-Hilal	Al-Taawoun*	6–0	12 September 2026	

== Multiple hat-tricks ==
The following table lists the number of hat-tricks scored by players who have scored at least two hat-tricks.

Players in bold are still active in the Pro League. Players in italics are still active outside the Pro League.

As of 22 August 2026

Multiple Saudi Pro League hat-tricks by player
Rank	Player	Hat-tricks	Last hat-trick
1	(Morocco) **Abderrazak Hamdallah**	11	13 March 2025
2	(Syria) **Omar Al Somah**	9	1 May 2025
3	(Saudi Arabia) Yasser Al-Qahtani	7	8 May 2016
4	(Saudi Arabia) Nasser Al-Shamrani	6	28 March 2014
4	(France) **Karim Benzema**	6	8 April 2026
4	(Portugal) **Cristiano Ronaldo**	6	4 May 2024
4	(England) **Ivan Toney**	6	22 August 2026
8	(Saudi Arabia) Mukhtar Fallatah	5	29 October 2016
9	(Saudi Arabia) Essa Al-Mehyani	4	26 February 2006
9	(France) Bafétimbi Gomis	4	11 March 2021
9	(Saudi Arabia) Hamzah Idris	4	6 March 2002
9	(Mexico) **Julián Quiñones**	4	21 May 2026
9	(Brazil) Sérgio Ricardo	4	20 March 2005
9	(Brazil) Victor Simões	4	4 December 2012
15	(Saudi Arabia) Majed Abdullah	3	18 February 1983
15	(Portugal) **João Felix**	3	7 May 2026
15	(Nigeria) Odion Ighalo	3	25 November 2023
15	(Cameroon) Léandre Tawamba	3	25 January 2021
19	(Morocco) Hicham Aboucherouane	2	6 January 2010
19	(Saudi Arabia) Hussam Abo Dawood	2	23 December 1983
19	(Saudi Arabia) Obeid Al-Dosari	2	19 January 2000
19	(Saudi Arabia) Talal Al-Meshal	2	30 December 1999
19	(Saudi Arabia) Marzouk Al-Otaibi	2	15 January 2004
19	(Saudi Arabia) Yousef Al-Salem	2	25 February 2011
19	(Saudi Arabia) Abdulaziz Al-Saran	2	10 April 2003
19	(Saudi Arabia) **Saleh Al-Shehri**	2	19 April 2019
19	(Saudi Arabia) Al-Hasan Al-Yami	2	13 March 2008
19	(Saudi Arabia) Muhannad Assiri	2	24 February 2011
19	(Ghana) Godwin Attram	2	8 December 2006
19	(Cape Verde) Djaniny	2	16 May 2019
19	(Morocco) Karim El Berkaoui	2	2 May 2023
19	(Saudi Arabia) Naif Hazazi	2	29 August 2010
19	(Brazil) Jandson	2	14 April 2017
19	(Guinea) Alhassane Keita	2	11 April 2011
19	(Brazil) **Malcom**	2	25 November 2023
19	(Senegal) Richard Manga	2	28 August 2004
19	(Colombia) **Roger Martínez**	2	18 January 2026
19	(Brazil) Thiago Neves	2	28 December 2013
19	(Serbia) Aleksandar Prijovic	2	28 February 2021
19	(Venezuela) Gelmin Rivas	2	10 December 2015
19	(Brazil) Jose Rogeiro Pereira	2	19 November 2004
19	(Saudi Arabia) Ibrahim Suwayed	2	20 October 1999
19	(Ecuador) Carlos Tenorio	2	23 January 2003
19	(Brazil) Talisca	2	29 February 2024

== Hat-tricks by nationality ==
The following table lists the number of hat-tricks scored by players from a single nation.

As of 24 August 2026

Saudi Pro League hat-tricks by nationality
Rank	Nation	Hat-tricks	Last hat-trick
1	Saudi Arabia	82	8 May 2025
2	Brazil	36	29 January 2026
3	Morocco	20	13 March 2025
4	France	13	14 August 2026
5	Syria	10	1 May 2025
6	Portugal	9	7 May 2026
7	Cameroon	6	10 May 2024
7	England	6	22 August 2026
9	Nigeria	5	14 September 2023
10	Algeria	4	21 March 2021
10	Colombia	4	1 January 2026
10	Mexico	4	21 May 2026
10	Senegal	4	12 May 2025
10	Serbia	4	1 September 2023
15	Egypt	3	29 December 2017
15	Ghana	3	21 September 2023
17	Argentina	2	21 September 2018
17	Cape Verde	2	16 May 2019
17	Ecuador	2	23 January 2003
17	Guinea	2	1 April 2011
17	Netherlands	2	24 August 2026
17	Tunisia	2	28 November 1980
17	Venezuela	2	10 December 2015
24	Albania	1	16 December 2010
24	Angola	1	19 August 2009
24	Australia	1	29 November 2020
24	Chile	1	19 December 2019
24	DR Congo	1	31 May 2005
24	Gabon	1	31 May 2023
24	Gambia	1	9 February 2004
24	Italy	1	23 May 2004
24	Ivory Coast	1	9 February 2004
24	Libya	1	23 August 2007
24	Norway	1	19 October 2025
24	São Tomé and Príncipe	1	14 February 2014
24	Sierra Leone	1	13 March 2006
24	Spain	1	30 September 2023
24	Sweden	1	1 January 2021
24	FR Yugoslavia	1	17 March 2006
24	Zimbabwe	1	6 October 2022
