= Ahmed Otaif =

Saudi Arabian footballer

Personal information
- Date of birth: 14 April 1983 (age 43)
- Place of birth: Riyadh, Saudi Arabia
- Height: 1.69 m (5 ft 7 in)
- Position: Midfielder

Youth career
- 1998-2001: Al-Shabab

Senior career*
Years	Team	Apps	(Gls)
2001–2018	Al-Shabab	176	(23)

International career^{‡}
2004–2006	Saudi Arabia U23		
2006–2013	Saudi Arabia	59	(1)
- * Club domestic league appearances and goals as of 16 March 2008 (UTC) ‡ National team caps and goals as of 24 Jan 2011

Ahmed Otaif (Arabic: أحمد عطيف; born 14 April 1983) is a retired Saudi professional footballer who played for Al-Shabab and the Saudi Arabia national team. He spent his entire playing career at Al-Shabab and captained the side from 2008 until his retirement in 2018. He won nine titles with Al-Shabab and captained the side to the 2011–12 Saudi Professional League title. Otaif earned 59 caps with the Saudi Arabia national team and represented them at three different tournaments including the 2011 AFC Asian Cup.

Ahmed Otaif is the older brother of current Al-Hilal player Abdullah Otayf and former Al-Shabab players Abdoh Otaif, Ali Otayf and Saqer Otaif.

== Career statistics ==
=== Club ===
As of match played 12 April 2018

Club	Season	League		King Cup		Crown Prince Cup		Asia		Other		Total	
Club	Season	Apps	Goals	Apps	Goals	Apps	Goals	Apps	Goals	Apps	Goals	Apps	Goals
Al-Shabab	2001–02	?	?	—		0	0	—		?	?	?	?
Al-Shabab	2002–03	?	?	—		2	0	—		?	?	?	?
Al-Shabab	2003–04	?	?	—		0	0	—		?	?	?	?
Al-Shabab	2004–05	?	?	—		2	1	5	0	?	?	?	?
Al-Shabab	2005–06	?	?	—		4	0	8	0	?	?	?	?
Al-Shabab	2006–07	?	?	—		2	0	6	1	?	?	?	?
Al-Shabab	2007–08	?	?	4	0	4	0	—		?	?	?	?
Al-Shabab	2008–09	19	3	5	0	4	0	4	0	1 (Note: Appearances in Prince Faisal bin Fahd Cup)	0	33	3
Al-Shabab	2009–10	20	1	4	0	3	0	10	0	2	0	39	1
Al-Shabab	2010–11	17	1	2	0	0	0	5	0	—		24	1
Al-Shabab	2011–12	25	3	2	0	2	0	—		—		29	3
Al-Shabab	2012–13	26	0	5	0	1	0	10	0	—		42	0
Al-Shabab	2013–14	16	0	6	0	3	0	8	2	—		33	2
Al-Shabab	2014–15	22	0	1	0	1	0	6	0	1 (Note: Appearance in Saudi Super Cup)	0	31	0
Al-Shabab	2015–16	4	0	0	0	2	0	—		—		6	0
Al-Shabab	2016–17	14	1	1	0	1	0	—		—		16	1
Al-Shabab	2017–18	11	0	3	0	0	0	—		—		14	0
Al-Shabab	Total	174+	9+	33	0	29	1	62	3	4+	0+	302+	10+
Career totals		174+	9+	33	0	29	1	62	3	4+	0+	302+	10+

=== International ===
Statistics accurate as of match played 9 September 2013.

Saudi Arabia
Year	Apps	Goals
2006	1	0
2007	0	0
2008	13	0
2009	17	1
2010	6	0
2011	13	0
2012	5	0
2013	4	0
Total	59	1

=== International goals ===
#	Date	Venue	Opponent	Score	Result	Competition
1.	8 January 2009	Royal Oman Police Stadium, Muscat	Yemen	4–0	6–0	19th Arabian Gulf Cup

== Honours ==
Al-Shabab

- Saudi Professional League: 2003–04, 2005–06, 2011–12
- King Cup: 2008, 2009, 2014
- Saudi Super Cup: 2014
- Prince Faisal bin Fahd Cup: 2008–09, 2009–10

Individual

- Saudi Professional League Player of the Season: 2008–09
