= Mohammed Noor =

Saudi Arabian footballer (born 1977)

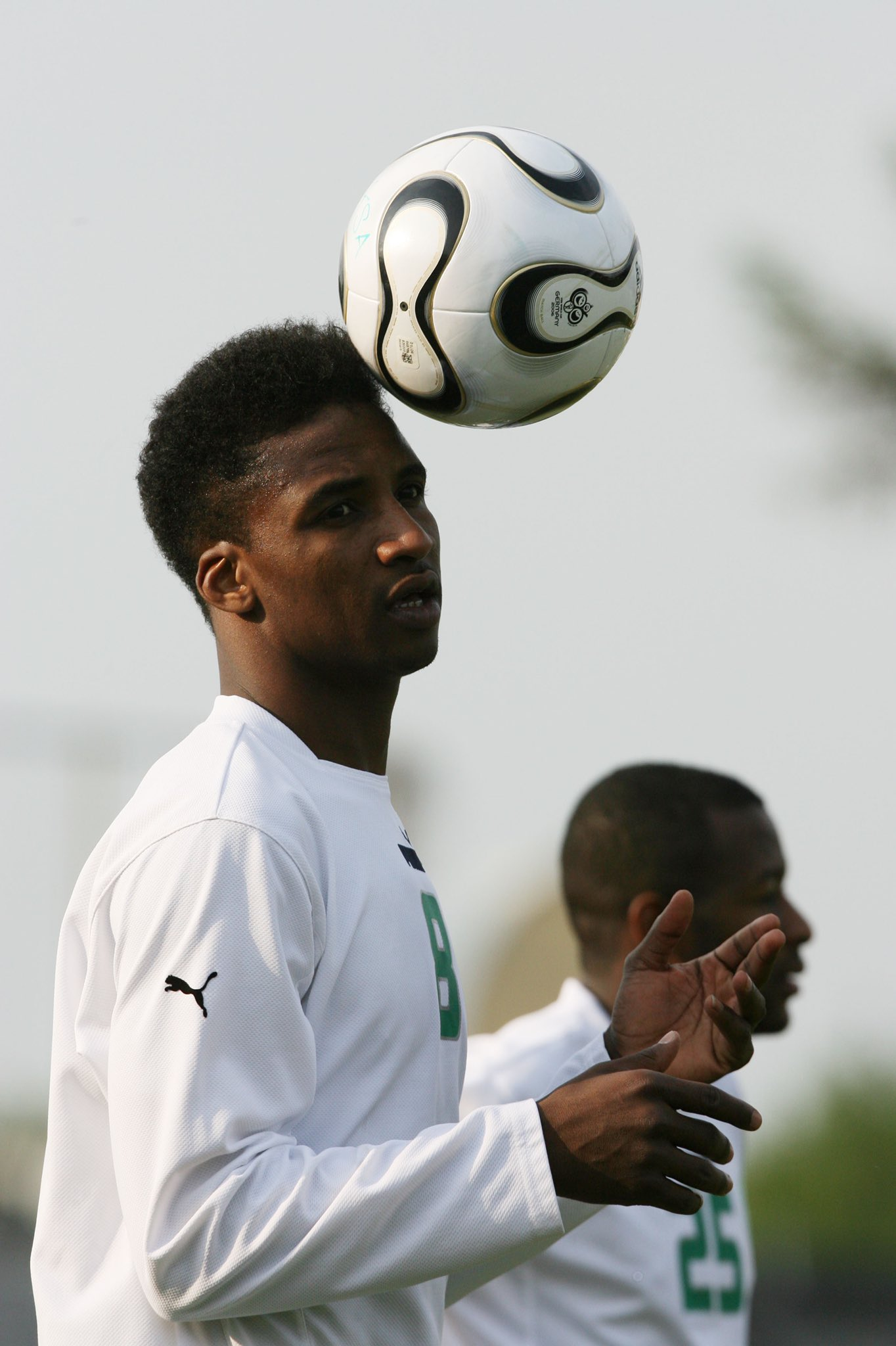
- Mohammed Noor in 2006

Personal information
- Full name: Mohammed Mohammed; Noor Adam; Al-Hawsawi
- Date of birth: 26 February 1978 (age 48)
- Place of birth: Mecca, Saudi Arabia
- Height: 1.84 m (6 ft 1/2 in)
- Position: Attacking midfielder

Senior career*
Years	Team	Apps	(Gls)
1996–2013	Al-Ittihad	482	(116)
2013–2014	Al Nassr	23	(8)
2014–2016	Al-Ittihad	20	(2)
Total		525	(126)

International career^{‡}
1999–2012	Saudi Arabia	90	(8)
- * Club domestic league appearances and goals as of 14 December 2022 ‡ National team caps and goals as of 14 December 2022

Mohammed Mohammed Noor Adam Al-Hawsawi (Arabic: محمد محمد نور آدم الهوساوي; born 26 February 1978), commonly known as Mohammed Noor (Arabic pronunciation: [moʊˈhæməd ˈnuːɾ]), also known as Abu Nooran and by his short name Noor, is a retired footballer from Saudi Arabia who played as an attacking midfielder. He played almost all of his career for Saudi Professional League side Al Ittihad, serving most of his time there as captain. Regarded as one of the best players to ever play in asia, he is known for his versatile style of play and leadership.

== International career ==
His first appearance with the national football team was in the 1999 FIFA Confederations Cup in the semi - finals against Brazil. Noor played for Saudi Arabia in the 2002 World Cup, without any real success. He fared better in the 2005 FIFA Club World Championship in Japan for Al-Ittihad. While playing for the Saudi Arabia national team on 14 June 2006, Noor managed to deliver a powerful performance while also having come down with a bad case of influenza. During the second half of the Saudi Arabian game against Tunisia (their opening match of the 2006 FIFA World Cup), he provided Al-Qahtani with the winning assist which secured Saudi Arabia's first goal of the match, bringing the score from a 1–0 lead for Tunisia to a 1–1 tie.

== Career statistics ==
=== Club ===
Appearances and goals by club, season and competition
Club	Season	League			King Cup		Saudi Crown Prince Cup		Asia		Arab/Gulf		Other		Total	
Club	Season	Division	Apps	Goals	Apps	Goals	Apps	Goals	Apps	Goals	Apps	Goals	Apps	Goals	Apps	Goals
Al-Ittihad Club (Jeddah)	1996–97	Saudi Premier League	13	0	0	0	2	0	0	0	0	0	0	0	15	0
Al-Ittihad Club (Jeddah)	1997–98	Saudi Premier League	15	0	0	0	1	0	0	0	3	1	5	0	24	1
Al-Ittihad Club (Jeddah)	1998–99	Saudi Premier League	22	1	0	0	2	1	5	1	2	1	0	0	31	4
Al-Ittihad Club (Jeddah)	1999–2000	Saudi Premier League	18	0	0	0	2	0	0	0	0	0	4	0	24	0
Al-Ittihad Club (Jeddah)	2000–01	Saudi Premier League	17	3	0	0	3	1	0	0	5	2	1	0	26	6
Al-Ittihad Club (Jeddah)	2001–02	Saudi Premier League	21	0	0	0	3	0	0	0	4	0	1	0	29	0
Al-Ittihad Club (Jeddah)	2002–03	Saudi Premier League	20	4	0	0	3	2	0	0	3	1	3	1	29	8
Al-Ittihad Club (Jeddah)	2003–04	Saudi Premier League	19	9	0	0	4	2	4	4	4	0	5	0	36	15
Al-Ittihad Club (Jeddah)	2004–05	Saudi Premier League	22	1	0	0	3	0	0	0	6	2	5	2	36	5
Al-Ittihad Club (Jeddah)	2005–06	Saudi Premier League	17	7	0	0	3	2	5	2	1	0	0	0	26	11
Al-Ittihad Club (Jeddah)	2006–07	Saudi Premier League	9	2	0	0	2	0	0	0	4	2	3	1	18	5
Al-Ittihad Club (Jeddah)	2007–08	Saudi Premier League	21	7	0	0	3	1	0	0	4	0	2	1	30	9
Al-Ittihad Club (Jeddah)	2008–09	Saudi Premier League	18	6	3	1	2	1	6	4	2	1	0	0	31	13
Al-Ittihad Club (Jeddah)	2009–10	Saudi Premier League	15	4	4	0	1	0	11	8	0	0	5	1	36	13
Al-Ittihad Club (Jeddah)	2010–11	Saudi Premier League	17	5	2	0	4	1	5	1	4	1	0	0	32	8
Al-Ittihad Club (Jeddah)	2011–12	Saudi Premier League	12	6	4	4	4	0	8	1	0	0	0	0	28	11
Al-Ittihad Club (Jeddah)	2012–13	Saudi Premier League	20	5	3	0	1	0	4	1	3	1	0	0	31	7
Al-Ittihad Club (Jeddah)	Total		295	60	16	5	43	11	48	22	45	12	34	6	482	116
Al Nassr FC	2013–14	Saudi Premier League	19	0	2	0	1	0	0	0	0	0	0	0	23	0
Al-Ittihad Club (Jeddah)	2014–15	Saudi Premier League	14	0	0	0	0	0	0	0	0	0	0	0	14	2
Al-Ittihad Club (Jeddah)	2015–16		6	0	0	0	0	0	0	0	0	0	0	0	6	0
Al-Ittihad Club (Jeddah)	Total		20	0	0	0	0	0	0	0	0	0	0	0	20	2
Career total			334	60	14	5	44	11	48	22	45	12	34	6	525	118

=== International ===
#	Date	Venue	Opponent	Score	Result	Competition
1	30 December 2002	Kuwait City, Kuwait	Bahrain	1–0	Won	2002 Arab Nations Cup
2	6 October 2003	Riyadh, Saudi Arabia	Yemen	7–0	Won	2004 AFC Asian Cup qualification
3	17 October 2003	Jakarta, Indonesia	Indonesia	6–0	Won	2004 AFC Asian Cup qualification
4	6 January 2004	Kuwait City, Kuwait	Oman	2–1	Won	16th Arabian Gulf Cup
5	9 June 2004	Riyadh, Saudi Arabia	Turkmenistan	3–0	Won	2006 FIFA World Cup qualification
6	6 June 2009	Tianjin, China	China	4–1	Won	Friendly match
7	28 July 2011	Hong Kong	Hong Kong	5–0	Won	2014 FIFA World Cup qualification
8	11 November 2011	Riyadh, Saudi Arabia	Thailand	3–0	Won	2014 FIFA World Cup qualification

== Honours ==
Al-Ittihad

- AFC Champions League: 2004, 2005
- Asian Cup Winners Cup: 1999
- Saudi Professional League (7): 1997, 1999, 2000, 2001, 2003, 2007, 2009,
- Saudi Crown Prince Cup: 1997, 2001, 2004
- Prince Faisal Bin Fahd Cup: 1997, 1999
- Arab Champions League: 2005
- GCC Club Cup: 1999
- Saudi-Egyptian Super Cup: 2001, 2003
- King Cup of Champions: 2010

Al-Nassr

- Saudi Crown Prince Cup: 2013–14
- Saudi Professional League: 2014

Saudi Arabia

- Arab Nations Cup: 2002
- Arabian Gulf Cup: 2003-04

Individual

- Arabian Footballer of the Year: 2003
- Arab Nations Cup 2002 - Most Valuable player
- Best Player In Saudi Premier League: 2009
- Arab Player of the Decade (MBC group poll): 2000–2010
- Asian Footballer of the Year Nominee: 2009
- Best player in Saudi Arabia: 2010
- MVP in the Asian Champions League: 2005
- Saudi portadol (2018-2019)
- Saudi portadol goalscorer
