= Abdulaziz Al-Saran =

Saudi Arabian footballer

Abdulaziz Al-Saran عبد العزيز السعران
Personal information
- Full name: Abdulaziz Nasser Al-Saran
- Date of birth: 25 January 1984 (age 42)
- Place of birth: Riyadh, Saudi Arabia
- Height: 1.71 m (5 ft 7 in)
- Position: Forward

Youth career
- Ushaiger
- Al-Hilal

Senior career*
Years	Team	Apps	(Gls)
2002–2012	Al-Shabab		
2012–2013	Al-Nassr	4	(0)
2013–2015	Al-Faisaly	17	(0)
2015	Al-Nahda		

International career
2002–2003	Saudi Arabia U20		
2009–2010	Saudi Arabia	5	(1)
- * Club domestic league appearances and goals as of 17 May 2020

Abdulaziz Al-Saran (Arabic: عبد العزيز السعران; born 25 January 1984) is a retired Saudi Arabian footballer who played as a forward.

== Career ==
Al-Saran began his career at the youth team of Ushaiger before joining Al-Hilal. He then left the club and joined Al-Shabab. On 21 January 2012, he left Al-Shabab and joined Al-Nassr. On 16 August 2013, Al-Saran left Al-Nassr and joined Al-Faisaly. On 26 January 2015, he was released by Al-Faisaly and subsequently joined Al-Nahda.

== Honours ==
=== Club ===
Al-Shabab

- Saudi Professional League: 2003–04, 2005–06, 2011–12
- King Cup: 2008, 2009
- Saudi Federation Cup: 2008–09, 2009–10
