= Nasser Al-Shamrani =

Saudi Arabian footballer (born 1983)

Personal information
- Full name: Nasser Ali Al-Shamrani
- Date of birth: 23 November 1983 (age 42)
- Place of birth: Mecca, Saudi Arabia
- Height: 1.73 m (5 ft 8 in)
- Position: Forward

Youth career
- 2000–2004: Al-Wehda

Senior career*
Years	Team	Apps	(Gls)
2003–2007	Al-Wehda	56	(20)
2006	→ Al-Shabab (loan)	6	(3)
2007–2013	Al-Shabab	123	(87)
2013–2017	Al-Hilal	75	(45)
2017	→ Al Ain (loan)	10	(8)
2017–2019	Al-Shabab	39	(12)
2019	Al-Ittihad	2	(0)
2021	Al-Hidd	6	(2)
Total		317	(177)

International career^{‡}
2005–2018	Saudi Arabia	78	(19)
- * Club domestic league appearances and goals as of 07 May 2019 ‡ National team caps and goals as of 28 February 2018

Nasser Al-Shamrani (Arabic: ناصر الشمراني; born 23 November 1983) is a Saudi Arabian former footballer who played for the Saudi Arabia national team as a forward. Often considered one of the most versatile, effective Saudi Arabian strikers of all time, he won the Asian Footballer of the Year award in 2014.

== Club career ==
=== Al-Wehda ===
Al-Shamrani began his professional career at the age of 20 playing with Al-Wehda's first team, in the 2003–04 season. He was young then, but along with his teammate Essa Al-Mehyani, was one of the main strikers at the club. Even though Al-Wehda had talented young strikers, they did not win any tournaments and the highest rank they achieved in the Saudi Premier League was 3rd place in the 2006–07 season.

=== Al-Shabab ===
During the 2005–06 season, Al-Shabab decided to try Al-Shamrani out, and a loan deal was agreed till the end of the season (Al-Wehda accepted because at that time they had no chance of competing in all of the local tournaments). During these couple of months, Al-Shamrani was able to prove his worth as a striker. He scored four goals in the AFC Champions League, which helped Al-Shabab reach the quarter-finals that year. In the league, he scored three goals, including the third in the Saudi Premier League final against Al-Hilal, which ended 3–0. After the end of the season, Al-Shabab were impressed by his performance, and tried sign a contract with him, but Al-Wehda refused and by the 2006–07 season he returned to Al-Wehda.

Al-Shamrani had one of his best seasons with Al-Wehda, scoring nine goals in the Saudi Premier League. He helped his team reach 3rd place in the league, though he did not score any goals in the golden play-off games against Al-Shabab and Al-Ittihad. By the end of the season, Al-Wehda went through financial problems. Al-Shabab soon noticed this and offered 13 million riyals for Al-Shamrani. Al-Wehda accepted, and Al-Shamrani moved to Al-Shabab by the beginning of the 2007–08 season, signing a five-year contract for 13 million riyals.

Al-Shamrani's move to Al-Shabab was anticipated by many of their fans, but he began the season 'dry', without scoring any goal in the league. By the 6th round in the Saudi Premier League, he started his scoring with a hat-trick in Al-Qadisiya. He then scored continually in every game (1 goal against Al-Watani, 1 against Al-Nasr, 2 against Al-Ittihad, 1 against Al-Ta'ee, 1 against Al-Ahli, 1 against Al-Wehda, and 2 against Najran SC). He led the league goalscorers with 12 goals, but his former Al-Wehda teammate Eisa Al-Mehyani was closing the gap. was able to score 13 goals, and also with 13 goals.

By the end of the season, Al-Shamrani had scored 18 goals with Al Shabab, and won the Saudi Premier League's top goal scorer award for the first time, ahead of Al-Mehyani and Al Hasan Al-Yami.

=== Al-Hilal ===
On 30 June 2013, Al-Shamrani agreed to a three-year deal with the 'club of the century' in Asia, Al-Hilal. After losing the 2014 Asian Champions League final, he spat at Western Sydney Wanderers player Matthew Spiranovic before attempting to headbutt him. As a result of his conduct, Al-Shamrani was handed an 8 match Champions League ban from the Asian Football Confederation.

==== Al Ain (loan) ====
In 2017, it was reported that Al-Shamrani had joined United Arab Emirates side Al Ain FC in a 2 million Dhs deal for a six-month loan contract. This was his first experience playing outside Saudi Arabia, and with one of the most successful clubs in Asia. In his third match against Al Ahli, he assisted a goal in minute 91 which helped Al Ain FC to win in the 'classico'.

=== Return to Al-Shabab ===
In summer 2017, he returned to Saudi Arabia and Al-Shabab.

=== Al-Ittihad ===
In 2019, he played for Al-Ittihad.

=== Al-Hidd ===
On 9 March 2021, Al-Shamrani joined Bahraini side Al-Hidd.

== International career ==
On 30 December 2014, Al-Shamrani pushed a fan prior to Saudi Arabia's 4–1 loss to Bahrain and later missed the 2015 AFC Asian Cup due to "injury".

== Personal life ==
His brother Mohammed Al Shamrani was also a footballer who played for Manama Club, where he was the top scorer of the 2012–13 season, and Saudi clubs including Al Raed.

== Career statistics ==
=== Club ===
Appearances and goals by club, season and competition
Club	Season	League			National Cup		League Cup		Asia		Other		Total	
Club	Season	Division	Apps	Goals	Apps	Goals	Apps	Goals	Apps	Goals	Apps	Goals	Apps	Goals
Al-Wehda	2003–04	Saudi Premier League	16	2	—		1	0	—		2 (Note: Appearances in Saudi Federation Cup)	0	19	2
Al-Wehda	2004–05	Saudi Premier League	13	3	—		1	0	—		4	2	18	5
Al-Wehda	2005–06	Saudi Premier League	9	4	—		4	0	—		4	0	17	4
Al-Wehda	2006–07	Saudi Premier League	18	11	—		1	1	—		4	1	23	13
Al-Wehda	Total		56	20	—		7	1	—		14	3	77	24
Al-Shabab (loan)	2005–06	Saudi Premier League	6	3	—		0	0	5	3	0	0	11	6
Al-Shabab	2007–08	Saudi Premier League	19	18	5	7	4	1	—		1	1	29	27
Al-Shabab	2008–09	Saudi Pro League	20	12	5	3	3	1	7	6	2	0	37	22
Al-Shabab	2009–10	Saudi Pro League	14	9	0	0	0	0	4	1	2	1	20	11
Al-Shabab	2010–11	Saudi Pro League	23	17	2	1	1	2	7	2	—		33	22
Al-Shabab	2011–12	Saudi Pro League	25	21	2	1	2	1	—		—		29	23
Al-Shabab	2012–13	Saudi Pro League	22	10	3	3	1	1	8	3	—		34	17
Al-Shabab	Total		123	87	17	15	11	6	26	12	5	2	182	122
Al-Hilal	2013–14	Saudi Pro League	26	21	1	0	3	2	13	10	—		43	33
Al-Hilal	2014–15	Saudi Pro League	22	13	5	4	4	3	3	1	—		34	21
Al-Hilal	2015–16	Saudi Pro League	15	4	2	0	3	3	1	0	0	0	21	7
Al-Hilal	2016–17	Saudi Pro League	12	7	0	0	3	0	0	0	1 (Note: Appearance in Saudi Super Cup)	0	16	7
Al-Hilal	Total		75	45	8	4	13	8	17	11	1	0	114	68
Al-Ain (loan)	2016–17	UAE Pro League	10	8	0	0	0	0	5	3	—		15	11
Al-Shabab	2017–18	Saudi Pro League	21	7	2	1	1	0	—		—		24	8
Al-Shabab	2018–19	Saudi Pro League	18	5	2	0	—		—		—		20	5
Al-Shabab	Total		39	12	4	1	1	0	—		—		44	13
Al-Ittihad	2018–19	Saudi Pro League	2	0	0	0	—		5	3	—		7	3
Al-Hidd	2020–21	Bahraini Premier League	6	2	0	0	1	2	2	1	—		9	5
Career totals			317	177	29	20	33	17	60	33	20	5	457	248

=== International ===
Appearances and goals by national team and year
National team	Year	Apps	Goals
Saudi Arabia	2005	7	1
Saudi Arabia	2006	0	0
Saudi Arabia	2007	3	0
Saudi Arabia	2008	6	0
Saudi Arabia	2009	15	4
Saudi Arabia	2010	4	0
Saudi Arabia	2011	13	5
Saudi Arabia	2012	4	1
Saudi Arabia	2013	7	2
Saudi Arabia	2014	11	2
Saudi Arabia	2015	0	0
Saudi Arabia	2016	3	1
Saudi Arabia	2017	4	3
Saudi Arabia	2018	1	0
Total		78	19

==== International goals ====
Scores and results list Saudi Arabia's goal tally first.

As of 14 January 2017

#	Date	Venue	Opponent	Score	Result	Competition
1	29 January 2005	King Fahd International Stadium, Riyadh, Saudi Arabia	Turkmenistan	1–0	1–0	Friendly
2	12 August 2009	Al-Saada Stadium, Salalah, Oman	Oman	1–2	1–2	Friendly
3	9 September 2009	King Fahd International Stadium, Riyadh, Saudi Arabia	Bahrain	1–0	1–0	2010 FIFA World Cup qualification
4	14 October 2009	Stade 7 November, Radès, Tunisia	Tunisia	1–0	1–0	Friendly
5	14 November 2009	Prince Mohamed bin Fahd Stadium, Dammam, Saudi Arabia	Belarus	1–1	1–1	Friendly
6	13 July 2011	Amman International Stadium, Amman, Jordan	Jordan	1–1	1–1 (4–3 p)	Fox International Quartet Championship
7	23 July 2011	Prince Mohamed bin Fahd Stadium, Dammam, Saudi Arabia	Hong Kong	1–0	3–0	2014 FIFA World Cup qualification
8	23 July 2011	Prince Mohamed bin Fahd Stadium, Dammam, Saudi Arabia	Hong Kong	3–0	3–0	2014 FIFA World Cup qualification
9	28 July 2011	Siu Sai Wan Sports Ground, Siu Sai Wan, Hong Kong	Hong Kong	3–0	5–0	2014 FIFA World Cup qualification
10	6 September 2011	Prince Mohamed bin Fahd Stadium, Dammam	Australia	1–2	1–3	2014 FIFA World Cup qualification
11	29 February 2012	AAMI Park, Melbourne, Australia	Australia	2–1	2–4	2014 FIFA World Cup qualification
12	15 October 2013	Amman International Stadium, Amman, Jordan	Iraq	2–0	2–0	2015 AFC Asian Cup qualification
13	15 November 2013	Prince Mohamed bin Fahd Stadium, Dammam, Saudi Arabia	Iraq	2–1	2–1	2015 AFC Asian Cup qualification
14	16 November 2014	King Fahd International Stadium, Riyadh, Saudi Arabia	Bahrain	1–0	3–0	22nd Arabian Gulf Cup
15	23 November 2014	King Fahd International Stadium, Riyadh, Saudi Arabia	United Arab Emirates	1–0	3–2	22nd Arabian Gulf Cup
16	6 October 2016	King Abdullah Sports City, Jeddah, Saudi Arabia	Australia	2–2	2–2	2018 FIFA World Cup qualification
17	14 January 2017	Zayed Sports City Stadium, Abu Dhabi, United Arab Emirates	Cambodia	1–1	7–2	Friendly
18	14 January 2017	Zayed Sports City Stadium, Abu Dhabi, United Arab Emirates	Cambodia	2–1	7–2	Friendly
19	14 January 2017	Zayed Sports City Stadium, Abu Dhabi, United Arab Emirates	Cambodia	3–1	7–2	Friendly

== Honours ==
=== Club ===
Al-Shabab

- Saudi Pro League: 2005–06, 2011–12
- King Cup: 2008, 2009
- Saudi Federation Cup: 2008–09, 2009–10

Al-Hilal

- King Cup: 2015
- Crown Prince Cup: 2015–16
- Saudi Super Cup: 2015

Individual

- Asian Footballer of the Year: 2014
- Saudi Pro League top scorer: 2007–08, 2008–09, 2010–11, 2011–12, 2013–14

=== International ===
Saudi Arabia

- Islamic Solidarity Games: 2005 Gold Medal
