= Otayf =

Otayf is a surname. Notable people with the surname include:

- Abdullah Otayf (born 1992), Saudi Arabian footballer
- Ali Otayf (born 1988), Saudi Arabian footballer
