= Dan Coleman =

Dan or Daniel Coleman may refer to:

- Dan Coleman (American football) (born 1962), American football player
- Dan Coleman (composer) (born 1972), composer and music publisher
- Dan Coleman (basketball) (born 1985), American basketball player
- Daniel Coleman (footballer) (born 1984), Ghanaian footballer
- Daniel Coleman (judge) (1801–1857), justice of the Supreme Court of Alabama

== See also ==
- Daniel Coleman DeJarnette Sr. (1822–1881), Virginia politician
- Dan Colman (born 1990), American poker player
