= 2004–05 Saudi Premier League =

Saudi Premier League
- Season: 2004–05
- Champions: Al-Hilal (10th title)
- Relegated: Al-Riyadh; Ohod
- AFC Champions League: Al-Hilal; Al-Ittihad; Al-Shabab
- Top goalscorer: Mohammed Manga (15 goals)

Statistics of the 2004–05 Saudi Premier League, officially known as The Custodian of The Two Holy Mosques League Cup.

== Clubs ==
=== Stadia and locations ===
Locations of teams in the 2004-05 Saudi Professional League

Club	Location	Stadium	Head coach
Al-Ahli	Jeddah	Prince Abdullah Al-Faisal Sports City	(Brazil) Geninho
Al-Ansar	Medina	Prince Mohamed bin Abdulaziz Stadium	
Al-Ettifaq	Dammam	Prince Mohamed bin Fahd Stadium	(Tunisia) Mrad Mahjoub
Al-Hilal	Riyadh	King Fahd Sports City	(Brazil) Marcos Paquetá
Al-Ittihad	Jeddah	Prince Abdullah Al-Faisal Sports City	(Romania) Anghel Iordănescu
Al-Nassr	Riyadh	King Fahd Sports City	(Bulgaria) Dimitar Dimitrov
Al-Qadsiah	Khobar	Prince Saud bin Jalawi Sports City	(Tunisia) Ahmad Al-Ajlani
Al-Riyadh	Riyadh	King Fahd Sports City	(Serbia and Montenegro) Zoran Đorđević
Al-Shabab	Riyadh	King Fahd Sports City	(Brazil) Zé Mário
Al-Tai	Ḥaʼil	Prince Abdulaziz bin Musa'ed Sports City	(Tunisia) Khaled Ben Yahia
Al-Wehda	Mecca	King Abdulaziz Sports City	(Tunisia) Lotfi Benzarti
Ohod	Medina	Prince Mohamed bin Abdulaziz Stadium	

=== Foreign players ===
Club	Player 1	Player 2	Player 3	Player 4	Former players
Al-Ahli	(Brazil) Alessandro Cambalhota	(Brazil) Kim	(Brazil) Lúcio Flávio	(Brazil) Rogério Paulista	(Brazil) Bechara (Brazil) Paulinho
Al-Ansar	(Brazil) Celso Costa	(Senegal) Racine Diouf			(Brazil) Sílvio
Al-Ettifaq	(Republic of the Congo) Bhaudry Massouanga	(Ivory Coast) Lassina Traoré	(Morocco) Achraf Khalfaoui	(Oman) Fawzi Bashir	(Germany) Heiner Backhaus
Al-Hilal	(Angola) Paulo Silva	(Brazil) Marcelo Camacho	(Brazil) Marcelo Tavares	(Brazil) Mossoró	
Al-Ittihad	(Brazil) Sérgio Ricardo	(Colombia) Sergio Herrera	(Croatia) Mario Carević	(Morocco) Salahiddine Khlifi	(Brazil) Sérgio Júnior (Brazil) Tcheco (Serbia and Montenegro) Dejan Petković
Al-Nassr	(Brazil) Jerri	(Brazil) Weldon			
Al-Qadsiah	(Brazil) Zé Augusto	(Brazil) Zé Eduardo	(Morocco) Mustapha Allaoui	(Morocco) Said Kharazi	
Al-Riyadh	(Oman) Amad Al-Hosni	(Oman) Badar Al-Maimani	(Oman) Khalifa Ayil Al-Noufali		
Al-Shabab	(Colombia) Léider Preciado	(Ghana) Godwin Attram	(Iraq) Nashat Akram	(Senegal) Mohammed Manga	(Nigeria) Rashidi Yekini
Al-Tai	(Mauritania) Modi Ngalim Traoré	(Senegal) Drissa Coulibaly	(Senegal) Hamad Ji	(Senegal) Mody N'Diaye	
Al-Wehda	(Brazil) Cleberson	(Democratic Republic of the Congo) Patrick Kazadi	(Oman) Mohammed Rabia Al-Noobi		(Oman) Ahmed Kano (Tunisia) Lotfi Belhadj
Ohod					

== Final league table ==
Pos	Team	Pld	W	D	L	GF	GA	GD	Pts
1	Al-Shabab	22	14	6	2	42	16	+26	48
2	Al-Hilal	22	13	6	3	41	21	+20	45
3	Al-Ittihad	22	11	5	6	53	37	+16	38
4	Al-Nassr	22	11	5	6	37	31	+6	38
5	Al-Ahli	22	10	4	8	41	29	+12	34
6	Al-Wehda	22	7	7	8	35	36	−1	28
7	Al-Qadsiah	22	7	7	8	32	33	−1	28
8	Al-Tai	22	8	2	12	24	36	−12	26
9	Al-Ettifaq	22	6	7	9	26	23	+3	25
10	Al-Ansar	22	6	6	10	31	52	−21	24
11	Al-Riyadh	22	4	7	11	27	42	−15	19
12	Ohod	22	2	4	16	18	51	−33	10

== Championship playoffs ==
=== Match against fourth place ===
20 June 2005	Al-Ittihad	6–0	Al-Nassr	Prince Abdullah al-Faisal Stadium, Jeddah
	Osama Al-Muwallad 3'; Ahmad Al-Khayer 77' (o.g.); Marzouk Al-Otaibi 37'; Sérgio Ricardo 49'; Marzouk Al-Otaibi 61'; Saleh Al-Saqri 85'	(Report)		Referee: Carlos Megia Davila

=== Match against third place ===
7 July 2005	Al-Hilal	1–0	Al-Ittihad	King Fahd Stadium, Riyadh
	Marcelo Camacho 48'	(Report)		Referee: Massimo Busacca

=== Final ===
15 July 2005	Al-Shabab	0–1	Al-Hilal	King Fahd Stadium, Riyadh
		(Report)	57' Marcelo Camacho	Referee: Valentin Ivanov

Saudi Premier League
2004–05 winners
Al-Hilal
10th title

== Season statistics ==
=== Top scorers ===
Rank	Scorer	Club	Goals
1	(Senegal) Mohammed Manga	Al-Shabab	15
2	(Brazil) Rogério Paulista	Al-Ahli	13
2	(Brazil) Sérgio Ricardo	Al-Ittihad	13
4	(Brazil) Celso Costa	Al-Ansar	12
4	(Ghana) Godwin Attram	Al-Shabab	12
4	(Saudi Arabia) Saad Al-Harthi	Al-Nassr	12
7	(Saudi Arabia) Sami Al-Jaber	Al-Hilal	11
