= 1999–2000 Al Ain FC season =

Al Ain
1999–2000 season
- President: Mohammed Bin Zayed
- Manager: Ilie Balaci (from 15 November 1998 until 10 May 2000)
- UAE Football League: Winners
- President's Cup: Round of 16
- Federation Cup: Fourth place
- Asian Cup Winners' Cup: First round
- Top goalscorer: League: Majid Al Owais (15); All: Majid Al Owais (15)
Home colours	Away colours	Third colours

The 1999–2000 season was Al Ain Football Club's 32nd in existence and the club's 25th consecutive season in the top-level football league in the UAE.

== Competitions ==
=== Overview ===
Competition	First match	Last match	Starting round	Final position	Record							
Competition	First match	Last match	Starting round	Final position	Pld	W	D	L	GF	GA	GD	Win %
Football League	6 December 1999	10 May 2000	Matchday 1	Winners	22	13	7	2	47	25	+22	59.09
President's Cup	23 March 2000	23 March 2000	Round of 16	Round of 16	1	0	1	0	0	0	+0	0.00
Federation Cup	22 September 1999	17 November 1999	Group stage	Fourth place	12	6	3	3	19	12	+7	50.00
Asian Cup Winners' Cup	16 September 1999	20 September 1999	First round	First round	2	1	0	1	2	2	+0	50.00
Total					37	20	11	6	68	39	+29	54.05

Last updated: 10 May 2000
Source: Competitions

=== UAE Football League ===
==== League table ====
Pos	Team	Pld	W	D	L	GF	GA	GD	Pts	Qualification
1	Al Ain	22	13	7	2	47	25	+22	47 (Note: 1 bonus point from Federation Cup)	Champion
2	Al-Nasr	22	11	9	2	40	20	+20	46 (Note: 4 bonus points from Federation Cup)	
3	Al Wahda	22	12	6	4	49	27	+22	45 (Note: 3 bonus points from Federation Cup)	
4	Al-Shaab	22	10	8	4	37	27	+10	38	
5	Al Jazira	22	8	10	4	35	29	+6	34	

Source: rsssf.com

==== Matches ====
6 December 1999 1	Al Ain	1–0	Al Nasr	Al Ain
18:30 GMT+4 (UAE Time)	Ricardo (red card) 6'; S. Rashed 51'	Report		Stadium: Tahnoun bin Mohammed; Referee: Fareed Al-Marzouqi

13 December 1999 2	Al Wasl	4–3	Al Ain	Dubai
21:30 GMT+4 (UAE Time)	N. Khamees 14'; M. Omar 31', 67'; Daoudi 53'	Report	Al Owais 51', 56', 88'	Stadium: Zabeel Stadium; Referee: Abdullah Al Bannai

17 December 1999 3	Al Ain	2–1	Al Wahda	Al Ain
	Fakher 14'; G. Harib 41'	Report	Conteh 30' (pen.)	Stadium: Tahnoun bin Mohammed; Referee: Ali Bujsaim

23 December 1999 4	Baniyas	0–2	Al Ain	Abu Dhabi
		Report	S. Khater 8'; Al Owais 25'	Referee: Abdulaziz Al Mulla

26 December 1999 5	Al Ain	4–0	Al Khaleej	Al Ain
21:30 GMT+4 (UAE Time)	S. Khater 38'; Ricardo 58'; A. Gharib 83'; Al Owais 90'	Report		Stadium: Tahnoun bin Mohammed; Referee: Musallam Ahmad

29 December 1999 6	Al Shaab	2–2	Al Ain	Sharjah
	J. Al-Doukhi 20' (pen.); Denílson 73'		G. Harib 15'; S. Rashed 55'	Stadium: Khalid bin Mohammed Stadium; Referee: Mohamed Omar

4 January 2000 8	Al Ahli	2–3	Al Ain	Dubai
	Atiq 45'; F. Khalil 62'	Report	Zeigbo 26'; G. Harib 84'; R. Yaslam 86'	Stadium: Rashid Stadium; Referee: Abdulaziz Al Mulla

13 January 2000 7	Al Ain	2–1	Al Shabab	Al Ain
	Al Owais 25', 82'	Report	W. Obaid 35' (pen.)	Stadium: Tahnoun bin Mohammed; Referee: Salah Ameen

21 January 2000 9	Al Ain	2–1	Emirates	Al Ain
	G. Harib 72'; H. Saeed 79' (pen.)	Report	Balhoul 75'	Stadium: Tahnoun bin Mohammed; Referee: Fareed Al-Marzouqi

26 January 2000 10	Ittihad Kalba	2–2	Al Ain	Kalba
19:00 GMT+4 (UAE Time)	I. Mohamed 1'; Hassan .S 86'		Al Owais 64'; Al Nowais 80'	Stadium: Ittihad Kalba Stadium

3 February 2000 11	Al Ain	2–2	Al Jazira	Al Ain
	H. Saeed 32' (pen.); Al Owais 49'	Report	Tiéhi 66' (pen.), 89' (pen.)	Stadium: Tahnoun bin Mohammed

10 February 2000 12	Al Nasr	4–2	Al Ain	Dubai
	Mossi 23'; Bagheri 45', 56'; M. Ibrahim 88'	Report	H. Saeed 49'; S. Khater 65'	Stadium: Al Maktoum Stadium; Referee: Younis Al Yassi

5 March 2000 13	Al Ain	2–0	Al Wasl	Al Ain
	G. Harib 31'; S. Khater 90'	Report		Stadium: Tahnoun bin Mohammed

10 March 2000 14	Al Wahda	0–0	Al Ain	Abu Dhabi
19:30 GMT+4 (UAE Time)		Report		Stadium: Al Nahyan Stadium; Attendance: 15,000

29 March 2000 15	Al Ain	4–0	Baniyas	Al-Ain
	Fakher 15'; H. Hassan 24'; Al Owais 55', 62'	Report		Stadium: Tahnoun bin Mohammed; Referee: Mohamed Omar

3 April 2000 16	Al Khaleej	2–3	Al Ain	Khor Fakkan
19:30 GMT+4 (UAE Time)	Gilmar 57'; Hani .S 85'	Report	H. Hassan 12', 14'; S. Rashed 60'

7 April 2000 17	Al Ain	0–0	Al Shaab	Al-Ain
19:30 GMT+4 (UAE Time)		Report		Stadium: Tahnoun bin Mohammed

13 April 2000 18	Al Shabab	0–0	Al Ain	Dubai
		Report		Stadium: Maktoum bin Rashid Al Maktoum; Attendance: 5,000; Referee: Fareed Al-Marzouqi

20 April 2000 19	Al Ain	1–0	Al Ahli	Al-Ain
	H. Saeed 56' (pen.)	Report		Stadium: Tahnoun bin Mohammed; Referee: Younis Al Yassi

27 April 2000 20	Emirates	0–3	Al Ain	Ras al-Khaimah
		Report	Al Nowais 77', 89'; Al Owais 81'	Stadium: Emirates Club Stadium; Referee: Saeed Abdullah

3 May 2000 21	Al Ain	4–1	Ittihad Kalba	Al-Ain
	H. Saeed 63' (pen.); Al Owais 72'; A. Gharib 90'	Report	R. Saif 81'	Stadium: Tahnoun bin Mohammed; Referee: Abdulaziz Al Mulla

10 May 2000 22	Al Jazira	3–3	Al Ain	Abu Dhabi
19:30 GMT+4 (UAE Time)	Tiéhi 21'; Abedi 52'; M. Abdullah 82'	Report	Al Owais 7', 35'; Al Nowais 57'	Stadium: Al Jazira Stadium; Referee: Younis Al Yassi

=== UAE President's Cup ===
23 March 2000 R16	Hatta	0–0 (a.e.t.) (4–3 p)	Al Ain	Dubai
19:30 GMT+4 (UAE Time)		Report		Stadium: Zabeel Stadium; Referee: Hassan Eisa
	Penalties
	Faye (penalty missed); S. Amer (penalty scored); S. Mubarak (penalty missed); N. Juma (penalty scored); Anan (penalty scored); A. Ibrahim (penalty scored)		(penalty missed) S. Khater; (penalty missed) Al Owais; (penalty scored) Fahad. A; (penalty scored) R. Yaslam; (penalty scored) O. Gharib; (penalty missed) Fakher

=== UAE Federation Cup ===
==== Group B ====
Team	Pld	W	D	L	GF	GA	GD	Pts
Al Ain	10	6	3	1	18	6	+12	21
Al Nasr	10	6	3	1	18	10	+8	21
Al Jazira	10	5	4	1	17	11	+6	19
Emirates	10	3	1	6	15	20	−5	10
Al Shabab	10	2	3	5	12	16	−4	9
Al Khaleej	10	1	0	9	6	23	−17	3

Source: rsssf.org

22 September 1999 1	Al Ain	2–0	Al Shabab	Al Ain
	G. Harib 68'; Ricardo 82'	Report		Stadium: Tahnoun bin Mohammed; Referee: Abdullah Al Bannai

27 September 1999 2	Al Khaleej	0–5	Al Ain	Khor Fakkan
		Report	Fahad. A 19'; H. Saeed 60'; S. Khater 72'; G. Harib 77'; Ricardo 92'	Referee: Abdulaziz Al Mulla

30 September 1999 3	Al Ain	4–1	Al Jazira	Al Ain
	Nei Bala 1', 6'; Ricardo 24', 55'	Report	Tiéhi 25'	Stadium: Tahnoun bin Mohammed; Referee: Saeed Abdullah

7 October 1999 4	Al Nasr	0–1	Al Ain	Dubai
		Report	Ricardo 55'	Stadium: Al Maktoum Stadium

10 October 1999 5	Al Ain	1–1	Emirates	Al Ain
	H. Saeed 87' (pen.)	Report	B. Abdullah 10'	Stadium: Tahnoun bin Mohammed

13 October 1999 6	Al Shabab	1–1	Al Ain	Dubai
19:00 GMT+4 (UAE Time)	Fikri 35'	Report	H. Saeed 66' (pen.)	Stadium: Maktoum bin Rashid Al Maktoum

21 October 1999 7	Al Ain	1–0	Al Khaleej	Al Ain
	Ricardo 52'	Report		Stadium: Tahnoun bin Mohammed; Referee: Hassan Eisa

28 October 1999 8	Al Jazira	1–1	Al Ain	Abu Dhabi
	Tiéhi 34' (pen.)	Report	H. Saeed 5'	Stadium: Al Jazira Stadium; Referee: Ali Bujsaim

31 October 1999 9	Al Ain	1–2	Al Nasr	Al Ain
19:00 GMT+4 (UAE Time)	H. Saeed 54' (pen.)	Report	Mossi 16', 84'	Stadium: Tahnoun bin Mohammed; Referee: Saeed Abdullah

7 November 1999 10	Emirates	0–1	Al Ain	Ras al-Khaimah
19:00 GMT+4 (UAE Time)			Ricardo 35'	Stadium: Emirates Club Stadium

==== Semi-finals ====
11 November 1999	Al Wahda	4–0	Al Ain	Dubai
19:30 GMT+4 (UAE Time)	Conteh 12'; S. Khamees 50'; H. Ali 76'; Faye 83'	Report		Stadium: Al Maktoum Stadium

==== Third Place ====
17 November 1999	Al Ain	1–2	Al Wasl	Abu Dhabi
19:45 GMT+4 (UAE Time)	Ricardo 82'	Report	T. Darwish 25', 43'	Stadium: Al Jazira Stadium; Referee: Abdullah Al Bannai

=== Asian Cup Winners' Cup ===
==== First round ====
16 September 1999 First leg	Al Jaish (Syria)	0–1	(United Arab Emirates) Al Ain	Damascus
16:30 GMT+4 (UAE Time)		Report	H. Saeed 41'	Stadium: Abbasiyyin Stadium; Attendance: 9,000; Referee: Ahmad Abharan (Iran)

20 September 1999 Second leg	Al Ain (United Arab Emirates)	1–2 (2–2a agg.)	(Syria) Al Jaish	Al Ain
19:00 GMT+4 (UAE Time)	G. Harib 64'	Report	Afash 40'; Al-Sayed 69'	Stadium: Tahnoun bin Mohammed

== Statistics ==
=== Goalscorers ===
As of 10 May 2000

Includes all competitive matches. The list is sorted alphabetically by surname when total goals are equal.

Rank	Pos.	Player	Football League	President's Cup	Federation Cup	Asian Cup Winners' Cup	Total
1	FW	(United Arab Emirates) Majid Al Owais	15	0	0	0	15
2	MF	(United Arab Emirates) Helal Saeed	5	0	5	1	11
3	FW	(Brazil) Sérgio Ricardo	1	0	8	0	9
4	MF	(United Arab Emirates) Gharib Harib	5	0	2	1	8
5	MF	(United Arab Emirates) Subait Khater	4	0	1	0	5
6	FW	(United Arab Emirates) Fahad Al Nowais	4	0	0	0	4
7	FW	(Egypt) Hossam Hassan	3	0	0	0	3
7	MF	(United Arab Emirates) Sultan Rashed	3	0	0	0	3
9	MF	(United Arab Emirates) Awad Gharib	2	0	0	0	2
9	FW	(Brazil) Nei Bala	0	0	2	0	2
9	DF	(United Arab Emirates) Humaid Fakher	2	0	0	0	2
12	DF	(United Arab Emirates) Rami Yaslam	1	0	0	0	1
12	MF	(United Arab Emirates) Salem Johar	1	0	0	0	1
12	DF	(United Arab Emirates) Fahad Ali	0	0	1	0	1
12	FW	(Nigeria) Kenneth Zeigbo	1	0	0	0	1
Own goals (from the opponents)			0	0	0	0	0
Totals			47	0	19	2	68

=== Hat-tricks ===
Player	Against	Result	Date	Competition	Round
(United Arab Emirates) Majid Al Owais	Al Wasl	4–3 (A)	13 December 1999	Football League	2

^{4} – Player scored four goals.

== Awards ==
UAE Football League

Award	Player
Most Valuable Player	(United Arab Emirates) Gharib Harib
