= 2005–06 Saudi Premier League =

Saudi Premier League
- Season: 2005–06
- Champions: Al-Shabab (5th title)
- Relegated: Abha; Al-Ansar
- AFC Champions League: Al-Shabab; Al-Hilal
- Top goalscorer: Essa Al-Mehyani (16 goals)

Statistics of the 2005–06 Saudi Premier League.

== Clubs ==
=== Stadia and locations ===
Locations of teams in the 2005–06 Saudi Professional League

Club	Location	Stadium	Head coach
Abha	Abha	Prince Sultan bin Abdulaziz Sports City	(Saudi Arabia) Saad Al-Beshri
Al-Ahli	Jeddah	Prince Abdullah Al-Faisal Sports City	(Serbia and Montenegro) Nebojša Vučković
Al-Ansar	Medina	Prince Mohamed bin Abdulaziz Stadium	(Iraq) Adnan Hamad
Al-Ettifaq	Dammam	Prince Mohamed bin Fahd Stadium	(Brazil) Ednaldo Patricio
Al-Hazem	Ar Rass	Al-Hazem Club Stadium	(Tunisia) Mondher Ladhari
Al-Hilal	Riyadh	King Fahd Sports City	(Brazil) José Kléber
Al-Ittihad	Jeddah	Prince Abdullah Al-Faisal Sports City	(France) Bruno Metsu
Al-Nassr	Riyadh	King Fahd Sports City	(Argentina) Jorge Habegger
Al-Qadsiah	Khobar	Prince Saud bin Jalawi Sports City	
Al-Shabab	Riyadh	King Fahd Sports City	(Tunisia) Ahmad Al-Ajlani
Al-Tai	Ḥaʼil	Prince Abdulaziz bin Musa'ed Sports City	(Tunisia) Ammar Souayah
Al-Wehda	Mecca	King Abdulaziz Sports City	(Tunisia) Lotfi Benzarti

=== Foreign players ===
Club	Player 1	Player 2	Player 3	Player 4	Player 5	Former players
Abha	(Brazil) Flamarion	(Senegal) Drissa Coulibaly				
Al-Ahli	(Morocco) Abdelhaq Ait Laarif	(Morocco) Jaouad Akaddar	(Serbia and Montenegro) Dejan Damjanović			(Brazil) Rogério Paulista (Morocco) Youssef Rabeh
Al-Ansar	(Brazil) Celso Costa	(Ghana) Djibril Mandefu				
Al-Ettifaq	(Brazil) André Neles	(Brazil) Luís Alberto	(Ghana) Yaw Preko	(Morocco) Hamid Nater	(Morocco) Rabii Laafoui	(Morocco) Abdellatif Jrindou (Tunisia) Hassen Riahi
Al-Hazem	(Iraq) Qusay Munir	(Morocco) Salaheddine Aqqal	(Portugal) Toy			(Brazil) Zé Augusto
Al-Hilal	(Brazil) Giovanni	(Brazil) Marcelo Camacho	(Brazil) Marcelo Tavares	(Togo) Franck Atsou		(Brazil) Joelson
Al-Ittihad	(Cameroon) Joseph-Désiré Job	(Egypt) Mohamed Gouda	(Ghana) Prince Tagoe	(Morocco) Jaouad Zairi	(Sierra Leone) Mohamed Kallon	(Brazil) Cláudio Pitbull (Brazil) Lima (Brazil) Pedrinho (Brazil) Tcheco (Colombia) Sergio Herrera
Al-Nassr	(Brazil) Adriano Chuva	(Brazil) Jerri	(Ghana) Joetex Asamoah Frimpong	(Kuwait) Musaed Neda	(Panama) Alberto Blanco	(Ghana) Daniel Coleman
Al-Qadsiah	(Angola) Paulo Silva	(Brazil) Lindomar	(Lebanon) Mohammad Kassas	(Morocco) Salahiddine Khlifi	(Sierra Leone) Mahmadu Alphajor Bah	(Morocco) Mohamed El Mrini
Al-Shabab	(Brazil) Rogério Paulista	(Ghana) Godwin Attram	(Iraq) Nashat Akram			(Brazil) Túlio Maravilha
Al-Tai	(Senegal) Diene Faye	(Senegal) Hamad Ji				(Senegal) Drissa Coulibaly
Al-Wehda	(Cape Verde) Jerry Adriano	(Democratic Republic of the Congo) Patrick Kazadi	(Egypt) Sayed Abdel Hafeez	(Morocco) Khalid Zouine		

== Final league table ==
Pos	Team	Pld	W	D	L	GF	GA	GD	Pts
1	Al-Shabab	22	13	6	3	47	22	+25	45
2	Al-Hilal	22	13	5	4	41	21	+20	44
3	Al-Ittihad	22	11	9	2	47	28	+19	42
4	Al-Ahli	22	9	9	4	45	23	+22	36
5	Al-Ettifaq	22	9	6	7	31	25	+6	33
6	Al-Nassr	22	7	9	6	32	32	0	30
7	Al-Hazem	22	7	8	7	33	37	−4	29
8	Al-Qadsiah	22	8	5	9	23	32	−9	29
9	Al-Wehda	22	7	7	8	35	37	−2	28
10	Al-Tai	22	4	6	12	24	37	−13	18
11	Abha	22	3	4	15	23	57	−34	13
12	Al-Ansar	22	1	6	15	16	46	−30	9

== Championship playoffs ==
=== Match against fourth place ===
12 April 2006	Al-Ittihad	3-0	Al-Ahli	Prince Abdullah Al-Faisal Sports City, Jeddah
	Mohamed Kallon 32'; Prince Tagoe 71'; Prince Tagoe 79'	(Report)		Referee: Athanasios Briacos

=== Match against third place ===
16 April 2006	Al-Hilal	2-1	Al-Ittihad	King Fahd Sports City, Riyadh
	Mohammad Al-Shalhoub 94'; Mohammad Al-Shalhoub 103'	(Report)	109' Mohammed Noor	Referee: Luis Medina Cantalejo

=== Final ===
21 April 2006	Al-Shabab	3-0	Al-Hilal	King Fahd Sports City, Riyadh
	Abdulmohsen Al-Dosari 48' (pen.); Abdoh Otaif 50'; Nasser Al-Shamrani 82'	(Report)		Referee: Massimo Busacca

Saudi Premier League
2005–06 winners
Al-Shabab
5th title

== Season statistics ==
=== Top scorers ===
Rank	Scorer	Club	Goals
1	(Saudi Arabia) Essa Al-Mehyani	Al-Wehda	16
2	(Saudi Arabia) Saleh Bashir	Al-Ettifaq	15
3	(Senegal) Hamad Ji	Al-Tai	12
4	(Sierra Leone) Mohamed Kallon	Al-Ittihad	11
5	(Brazil) Marcelo Camacho	Al-Hilal	9
6	(Saudi Arabia) Malek Mouath	Al-Ahli	8
7	(Ghana) Prince Tagoe	Al-Ittihad	6
8	(Morocco) Abdelhaq Ait Laarif	Al-Ahli	5
