= 2006–07 Saudi Premier League =

Saudi Pro League
- Season: 2006–07
- Dates: 5 September 2006 – 1 June 2007
- Champions: Al-Ittihad (7th title)
- Relegated: Al-Faisaly; Al-Khaleej
- AFC Champions League: Al-Ittihad; Al-Ahli
- Arab Champions League: Al-Wehda; Al-Shabab
- Matches: 135
- Goals: 400 (2.96 per match)
- Top goalscorer: Godwin Attram (13 goals)
- Biggest home win: Al-Hilal 4–0 Al-Shabab (14 December 2006)
- Biggest away win: Al-Khaleej 2–8 Al-Ittihad (8 March 2007)
- Highest scoring: Al-Khaleej 2–8 Al-Ittihad (8 March 2007)

The 2006–07 Saudi Premier League was the 31st Saudi Pro League season and the last to feature the Golden Four format. Al-Shabab were the defending champions, but they were eliminated by Al-Wehda in the first stage of the Golden Four. Al-Ittihad, who finished second with a 5-point difference from first place Al-Hilal, went on to win the league 2–1 in Riyadh. Hamad Al-Montashari's header gave Al-Ittihad their 7th league title in the 94th minute of the match.

== Qualification and prize money ==
Prize Money:

- First Place: 2.5 million Saudi riyals
- Second Place: 1.5 million Saudi riyals
- Third Place: 1 million Saudi riyals

== Clubs ==
=== Stadia and locations ===
Locations of teams in the 2006–07 Saudi Professional League

Club	Location	Stadium	Head coach
Al-Ahli	Jeddah	Prince Abdullah Al-Faisal Sports City	(Serbia) Nebojša Vučković
Al-Ettifaq	Dammam	Prince Mohamed bin Fahd Stadium	(Tunisia) Ammar Souayah
Al-Faisaly	Harmah	Al Majma'ah Sports City	(France) Bernard Simondi
Al-Hazem	Ar Rass	Al-Hazem Club Stadium	(Brazil) Lula Pereira
Al-Hilal	Riyadh	King Fahd Sports City	(Brazil) Marcos Paquetá
Al-Ittihad	Jeddah	Prince Abdullah Al-Faisal Sports City	(Serbia) Dimitri Davidović
Al-Khaleej	Saihat	Prince Mohamed bin Fahd Stadium	(Tunisia) Lotfi Benzarti
Al-Nassr	Riyadh	King Fahd Sports City	(Argentina) Julio Asad
Al-Qadsiah	Khobar	Prince Saud bin Jalawi Sports City	(Saudi Arabia) Khalid Al-Koroni
Al-Shabab	Riyadh	King Fahd Sports City	(Portugal) José Morais
Al-Tai	Ḥaʼil	Prince Abdulaziz bin Musa'ed Sports City	(Brazil) João Carlos
Al-Wehda	Mecca	King Abdulaziz Sports City	(Germany) Theo Bücker

=== Foreign players ===
Club	Player 1	Player 2	Player 3	Player 4	Former players
Al-Ahli	(Brazil) Caio	(Brazil) Nunes	(Tunisia) Haykel Guemamdia	(Tunisia) Khaled Badra	(Serbia) Darko Anić (Serbia) Miodrag Anđelković
Al-Ettifaq	(France) Khalid Souhayli	(Romania) Radu Neguț	(Senegal) Ousmane N'Doye	(Tunisia) Wajih Sghaier	(Equatorial Guinea) André Neles (Ghana) Yaw Preko
Al-Faisaly	(Burkina Faso) Abdoulaye Cissé	(Martinique) Richard Massolin			(France) Kodjo Afanou
Al-Hazem	(Brazil) Anderson Potty	(Brazil) Geílson	(Brazil) Iranildo	(Senegal) Pape Touré	
Al-Hilal	(Brazil) Marcelo Tavares	(Brazil) Rodrigão	(Libya) Tarik El Taib	(Senegal) Ibrahima Ba	(Brazil) Guarú
Al-Ittihad	(Brazil) Lima	(Brazil) Reinaldo	(Brazil) Wágner	(Guinea) Alhassane Keita	(Mexico) Jared Borgetti (Slovenia) Milenko Ačimovič
Al-Khaleej	(Brazil) Sidney Moraes	(Tunisia) Lassaad Dridi	(Tunisia) Kaies Zouaghi	(Zambia) Owen Mwandabai	
Al-Nassr	(Albania) Adrian Aliaj	(Brazil) Denílson	(Netherlands) Mitchell van der Gaag	(Togo) Massamasso Tchangai	(Panama) Alberto Blanco (Peru) Roberto Palacios
Al-Qadsiah	(Brazil) Saraiva	(Morocco) Mohamed Madihi	(Portugal) Toy	(Sierra Leone) Mahmadu Alphajor Bah	(Morocco) Ahmed Essadeq (Senegal) Ely Cissé
Al-Shabab	(Egypt) Amir Azmy	(Ghana) Godwin Attram	(Iraq) Nashat Akram		(Gabon) Henri Antchouet (Senegal) Ousmane N'Doye
Al-Tai	(Bahrain) Abdulla Al-Marzooqi	(Morocco) Salaheddine Aqqal	(Senegal) Amadi Cissé	(Senegal) Mandoione Sylla	(Sierra Leone) Chernor Mansaray
Al-Wehda	(Montenegro) Vladimir Vujović	(Senegal) Daouda Ndiaye	(Senegal) Hamad Ji	(Tunisia) Marouane Bokri	

== Final league table ==
Pos	Team	Pld	W	D	L	GF	GA	GD	Pts
1	Al-Hilal	22	17	2	3	38	15	+23	53
2	Al-Ittihad (C)	22	15	3	4	52	25	+27	48
3	Al-Wehda	22	14	5	3	41	25	+16	47
4	Al-Shabab	22	14	2	6	45	27	+18	44
5	Al-Ahli	22	7	8	7	29	33	−4	29
6	Al-Ettifaq	22	6	7	9	34	34	0	25
7	Al-Tai	22	6	5	11	32	37	−5	23
8	Al-Hazem	22	6	3	13	28	38	−10	21
9	Al-Nassr	22	5	6	11	24	37	−13	21
10	Al-Qadsiah	22	5	5	12	22	36	−14	20
11	Al-Faisaly	22	4	6	12	23	42	−19	18
12	Al-Khaleej	22	4	6	12	21	40	−19	18

(C) Champions

=== Golden Four Stage 1 ===
18 May 2007

Al-Wehda	2 – 1	Al-Shabab
Talal Al-Khaibari 76'; Dawood Anday 80'	Report	Naji Majrashi 48'

King Abdulaziz Sports City, Mecca

=== Golden Four Stage 2 ===
24 May 2007

Al-Ittihad	3 – 2	Al-Wehda
Redha Tukar 24'; Alhassane Keita 46'; Alhassane Keita 113'	Report	Alaa Al-Kawkabi 28'; Essa Al-Mehyani 85'

Prince Abdullah Al-Faisal Sports City, Jeddah
Attendance: 20,000

=== Final ===
1 June 2007

Al-Hilal	1 – 2	Al-Ittihad
Omar Al-Ghamdi 25'	Report	Osama Al-Muwallad 75'; Hamad Al-Montashari 90+4'

King Fahd Sports City, Riyadh
Attendance: 56,000
Referee: Jan Wegereef

== Results ==
Home \ Away	AHL	ETT	FSY	HAZ	HIL	ITT	KLJ	NSR	QDS	SHB	TAI	WHD
Al-Ahli		1–1	0–0	3–2	2–3	1–1	1–1	1–1	1–0	1–5	3–2	2–0
Al-Ettifaq	2–2		4–2	0–3	0–1	2–3	2–0	2–1	0–0	3–3	2–2	0–1
Al-Faisaly	1–1	0–3		4–2	0–1	1–5	1–4	2–2	0–2	1–0	0–2	1–2
Al-Hazem	2–1	0–1	0–1		2–0	1–2	1–0	2–1	2–3	1–3	2–1	2–2
Al-Hilal	3–0	2–1	2–0	1–0		2–1	3–0	2–1	3–0	4–0	3–2	0–0
Al-Ittihad	3–0	1–1	5–2	2–0	1–2		2–0	3–0	2–1	2–1	3–2	1–0
Al-Khaleej	1–1	2–5	1–0	1–0	0–0	2–8		1–1	1–2	0–1	1–2	0–2
Al-Nassr	0–3	3–3	1–1	3–1	0–1	1–3	0–0		2–1	0–3	1–0	2–3
Al-Qadsiah	0–1	2–1	1–3	0–0	0–1	1–0	1–1	1–2		1–3	0–2	1–3
Al-Shabab	0–2	2–0	2–1	2–1	3–1	3–1	3–1	2–0	3–0		1–1	3–1
Al-Tai	4–2	1–0	1–1	2–2	0–2	0–1	0–1	0–2	3–3	4–2		1–4
Al-Wehda	1–0	2–1	1–1	5–2	2–1	2–2	4–3	2–0	2–2	1–0	1–0	

Updated to match(es) played on 1 June 2007. Source: rsssf.com
Legend: Blue = home team win; Yellow = draw; Red = away team win.

=== Season progress ===
Team ╲ Round	1	2	3	4	5	6	7	8	9	10	11	12	13	14	15	16	17	18	19	20	21	22
Al-Ahli	W	L	D	L	D	L	W	W	W	L	D	L	W	W	D	D	D	W	D	L	L	D
Al-Ettifaq	L	W	D	L	W	L	W	D	D	W	D	D	D	D	L	W	L	L	L	L	W	L
Al-Faisaly	L	L	W	D	D	L	L	L	W	L	L	W	D	L	D	D	L	L	D	W	L	L
Al-Hazem	L	W	L	W	L	L	L	L	L	D	L	W	L	W	L	D	L	W	L	L	W	D
Al-Hilal	W	L	W	W	W	W	W	W	W	W	W	D	D	L	W	W	W	W	W	W	W	L
Al-Ittihad	W	W	W	W	L	W	D	W	D	L	W	W	L	W	D	L	W	W	W	W	W	W
Al-Khaleej	L	L	L	L	L	L	W	W	L	D	D	D	L	L	W	L	L	W	L	D	D	D
Al-Nassr	W	L	L	D	W	W	L	L	L	D	L	L	D	L	D	W	W	L	D	L	D	L
Al-Qadsiah	W	L	L	D	L	L	L	L	W	L	W	D	W	W	L	L	L	L	L	D	D	D
Al-Shabab	W	W	L	W	W	W	W	D	L	W	L	L	W	D	L	W	W	W	W	W	L	W
Al-Tai	L	W	W	D	L	W	L	L	L	D	D	L	D	D	W	L	L	L	W	L	L	W
Al-Wehda	L	W	W	L	W	W	D	W	W	W	W	W	D	W	W	D	W	L	D	W	D	W

Source: kooora.com
W = Win; D = Draw; L = Lose

== Season statistics ==
=== Top scorers ===
Rank	Scorer	Club	Goals
1	(Ghana) Godwin Attram	Al-Shabab	13
2	(Guinea) Alhassane Keita	Al-Ittihad	12
3	(Saudi Arabia) Nasser Al-Shamrani	Al-Wehda	11
4	(Mexico) Jared Borgetti	Al-Ittihad	10
4	(Saudi Arabia) Yasser Al-Qahtani	Al-Hilal	10
4	(Saudi Arabia) Yousef Al-Salem	Al-Ettifaq	10
