= Talal Al-Khaibari =

Saudi Arabian footballer

Personal information
- Date of birth: 9 January 1977 (age 49)
- Place of birth: Saudi Arabia
- Height: 1.76 m (5 ft 9 in)
- Position: Left back

Senior career*
Years	Team	Apps	(Gls)
1997–1999	Al-Ahli	-	(-)
1999–2010	Al Wehda	-	(-)
2010–2011	Al Qadsiah	20	(2)
2011–2012	Al Wehda	-	(-)

International career
2007–2008	Saudi Arabia	6	(0)
- * Club domestic league appearances and goals

Talal Al-Khaibari (Arabic:طلال الخيبري) is a Saudi Arabian football left back who played for Saudi Arabia in the 2007 Asian Cup. He also played for Al-Ahli, Al Wehda and Al Qadsiah.
