= Sérgio Ricardo (footballer) =

Brazilian footballer (born 1974)

Personal information
- Full name: Sérgio Ricardo Messias Neves
- Date of birth: 25 May 1974 (age 52)
- Place of birth: Salvador, Brazil
- Height: 1.75 m (5 ft 9 in)
- Position: Forward

Youth career
- –1995: Fluminense de Feira

Senior career*
Years	Team	Apps	(Gls)
1995	Corinthians	20	(7)
1996–1997	Vasco da Gama	9	(2)
1997	Vitória	10	(2)
1997–1998	Botafogo	9	(1)
1997–1998	→ Al-Ahli (loan)	12	(12)
1998-1999	→ Al Sadd (loan)	13	(7)
1998–1999	Fenerbahçe	3	(2)
1998–1999	→ Sakaryaspor (loan)	8	(5)
1999	Al Ain		(1)
2000	Sport Club Internacional	13	(3)
2000-2001	Al-Nasr SC (Dubai)		(8)
2000	Al-Hilal		(6)
2001–2005	Al-Ittihad		(42)
2005-2006	Al-Ahli Doha	12	(12)
2006	Al-Gharafa	8	(4)
2006–2007	Al-Salmiya SC		(5)
2008–2009	Khor Fakkan Club		(0)
2009	Tigres do Brasil	4	(1)
2009–2010	Al-Raed		
2010–2011	Botafogo		
2012	Al-Shahania Sports Club	0	(0)
- * Club domestic league appearances and goals

Sérgio Ricardo Messias Neves (born 22 May 1974), also known as Sérgio Ricardo or Serginho, is a Brazilian professional footballer who played as a forward. He played for Fenerbahçe and Sakaryaspor in Turkey, Al-Ittihad, Al-Ahli and Al-Sadd in Qatar, Al-Hilal in Saudi Arabia, and Al Ain and Al Nasr in United Arab Emirates.

== Career ==
Sérgio Ricardo transferred to Turkish club Fenerbahçe in 1998–99 season start and then loaned to Sakaryaspor in January transfer window. 1999–00 season start he was loaned again to Al-Ittihad in Saudi Arabia. He won the Arab Cup Winners' Cup with the club. He returned to Fenerbahçe but was loaned again to a few Qatari clubs.

He was the top goal scorer of the 2003–04 Saudi Premier league with 15 goals.

== Honours ==
Crown Prince Cup: 1998, 2000, 2001, 2004

Saudi Pro League: 2001

Qatar Cup: 2003

Qatar Super Cup: 1998, 2003

Asian Club Championship: 2000

== Club career stats ==
Club	Season	League		Saudi Federation Cup&Emir of Qatar Cup		Crown Prince Cup		AFC Champions League		Other		Total	
Club	Season	Apps	Goals	Apps	Goals	Apps	Goals	Apps	Goals	Apps	Goals	Apps	Goals
Corinthians	1995	20	7	—		—		4 (Note: Appearances in Copa CONMEBOL)	2	2 (Note: Appearances in Exhibition game)	2	26	11
total		20	7	0	0	0	0	4	2	2	2	26	11
Vasco da Gama	1996	9	2 (Note: Goals in Campeonato Carioca)	—		—		—			2 (Note: Goals in Exhibition game)	18	4
total		9	2	0	0	0	0	0	0		2	18	4
Vitória	1996	10	2	—		—		—		—		10	2
total		10	2	0	0	0	0	0	0			10	2
Botafogo	1997	9	1 (Note: Goals in Campeonato Carioca)	—		—		—		—		9	1
total		9	1	0	0	0	0	0	0	0	0	9	1
Internacional	2000	13	3	—		—		—			1 (Note: Goals in Exhibition game)		4
total		13	3	0	0	0	0	0	0		1		4
Al Ahli Saudi FC	1997–98	12	12		3		2		0		2 (Note: Goals in 1997 Arab Club Champions Cup)		19
Career total		12	12		3		2		0		2		19
Al Ain	1999–2000		1		0		0	0	0		8 (Note: Goals in UAE Federation Cup)		9
Career total			1		0		0	0	0		8		9
Al-Hilal FC	1999–2000		6		0		1	2	4		0		11
Career total			6		0		1	2	4		0		11
Al-Sadd Sports Club	1997–98	3	2	3	4	1	2	0	0	0	0	7	8
Al-Sadd Sports Club	1998–99	10	5	0	0	2	0	0	0	0	0	12	5
Al-Sadd Sports Club	1999–2000	0	0	2	0	0	0	0	0	0	0	2	0
Al-Sadd Sports Club	2002–03	4	0	4	7	3	1	3	2	0	0	14	10
Career total		17	7	9	11	6	3	3	2	0	0	35	23
Al Ittihad Club (Jeddah)	2000–01		9		0		4		1		0		14
Al Ittihad Club (Jeddah)	2001-02		15		1		0		1		1 (Note: Goals in Saudi-Egyptian Super Cup)		18
Al Ittihad Club (Jeddah)	2003–04		5		0		0		0		5 (Note: Goals in 2002 Arab Unified Club Championship)		10
Al Ittihad Club (Jeddah)	2004–05		13		2		5		0		3 (Note: Goals in 2004–05 Arab Champions League)		23
Career total			42		3		9		2		9		65
Al-Arabi SC (Qatar)	2001–02	0	0	2	3	0	0	0	0	0	0	2	3
Career total		0	0	2	3	0	0	0	0	0	0	2	3
Al-Ahli SC	2005–06	12	12	0	0	0	0	0	0	3 (Note: Appearances in Qatar Sheikh Jassem Cup)	8	15	20
Career total		12	12	0	0	0	0	0	0	3	8	15	20
Al-Gharafa SC	2005–06	8	4	3	2	0	0	3	1	0	0	14	7
Career total		8	4	3	2	0	0	3	1	0	0	14	7
Al-Salmiya SC	2006–07		5		2		4		0		0		11
Career total			5		2		4		0		0		11
Al-Shahania SC	2011–12	0	0	2	1	0	0	0	0	0	0	2	1
Career total		0	0	2	1	0	0	0	0	0	0	2	1

== Personal life ==
Sérgio Ricardo performed Umrah after becoming a Muslim.
