= Saraiva (Brazilian footballer) =

Brazilian footballer

Personal information
- Full name: Roberto Saraiva Fagundes
- Date of birth: February 5, 1983 (age 43)
- Place of birth: Sapucaia do Sul, Brazil
- Height: 1.73 m (5 ft 8 in)
- Positions: Left winger; attacking midfielder

Team information
- Current team: Tarxien Rainbows F.C.
- Number: 10

Senior career*
Years	Team	Apps	(Gls)
2001–2005	Internacional		
2005	Grêmio		
2005	Flamengo		
2005–2006	CRB		
2007	Al-Qadisiya		
2007–2009	Herfølge Boldklub	47	(9)
2009–2010	HB Køge	10	(0)
2011	Porto Alegre		
2011	Grêmio Barueri		
2011–	Tarxien Rainbows F.C.		
- * Club domestic league appearances and goals as of 15 June 2009

Roberto Saraiva Fagundes (born February 5, 1983) is a Brazilian professional football midfielder, who is currently playing for Tarxien Rainbows FC. In Malta He is known as the Rainbows' little Brazilian star.

He is more common known as Saraiva.
