= Bhaudry Massouanga =

Congolese footballer (born 1982)

Masuanga Moldakoldad
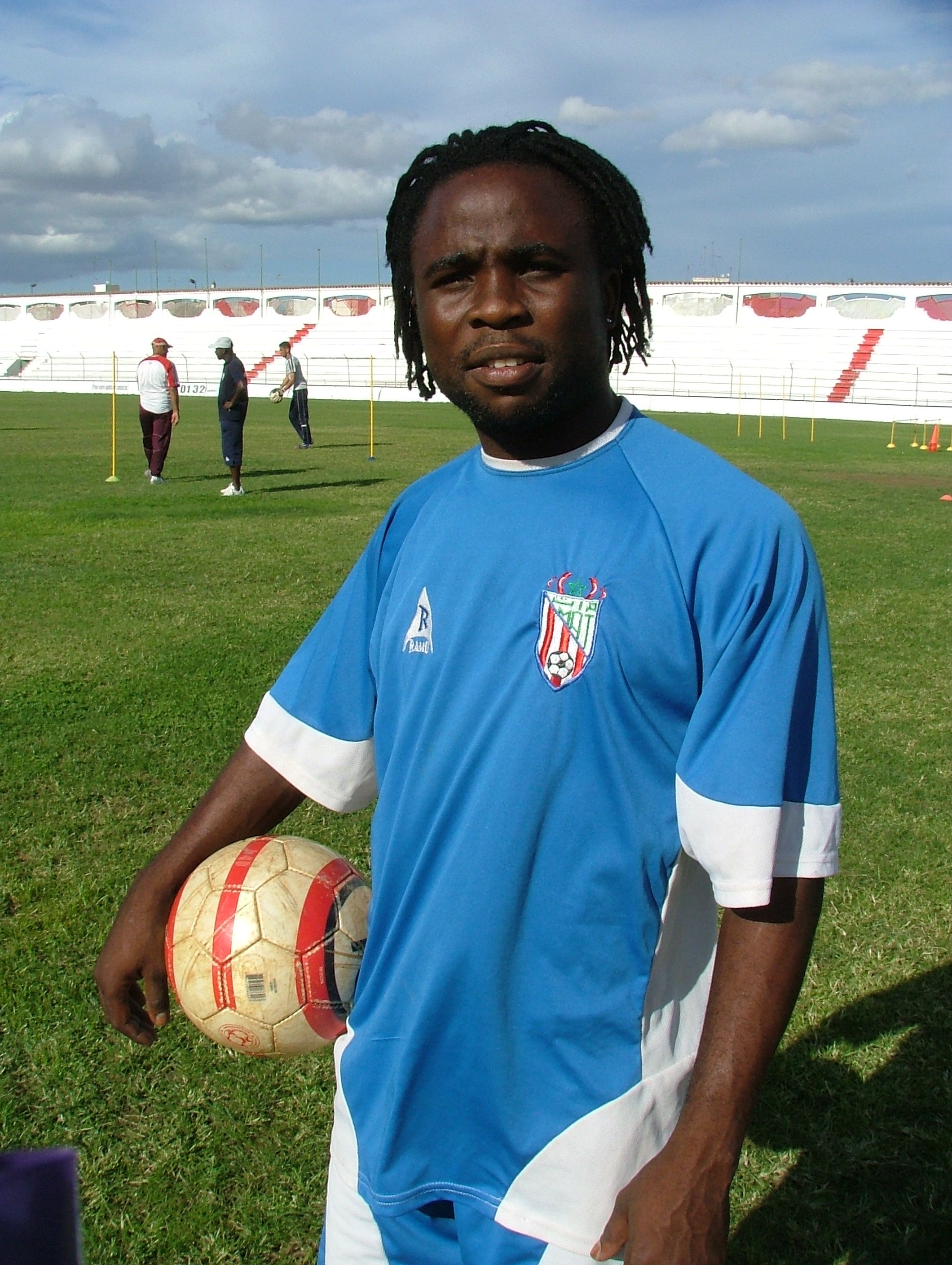
- Massouanga in Moghreb Tétouan training in 2006

Personal information
- Full name: Bhaudry Gildas Massouanga Moldakoldad
- Date of birth: 8 September 1982 (age 44)
- Place of birth: Republic of the Congo
- Position: Striker

Team information
- Current team: FC Olimpi Rustavi
- Number: 18

Youth career
- USM Libreville

Senior career*
Years	Team	Apps	(Gls)
2003–2004	USM Libreville		
2004–2005	OMR El Annasser		
2005–2006	NA Hussein-Dey		
2006–2007	Moghreb Tétouan		
2008–2010	FC Olimpi Rustavi		
2010-2011	Orly		
2011-2012	Sainte-Genevieve		
2013-2015	Nogent-sur-Oise		

International career
2003	Congo	1	(0)
- * Club domestic league appearances and goals

Bhaudry Gildas Massouanga Moldakoldad (born 8 September 1982) is a footballer from Republic of the Congo who currently plays in Georgia for FC Olimpi Rustavi. He previously spent two years playing in Algeria.

== Career ==
=== Club ===
He played in the Gabonese first division, the Algerian first division, the Moroccan first division and the Georgian first division (which he also won in the 2009-2010 season).

He finished his career in 2015, after a few seasons spent between the fourth and fifth French divisions.

=== National ===
He played one match for his country on 12 October 2003, coming off the bench in a 1-0 World Cup qualifying win over Sierra Leone.
