= Humaid Fakher =

Emirati footballer (born 1978)

Personal information
- Date of birth: 3 November 1978 (age 47)
- Place of birth: United Arab Emirates
- Position: Defender

Senior career*
Years	Team	Apps	(Gls)
1997–2009	Al Ain FC		
2009–2010	Baniyas Club		

International career
2000–2007	United Arab Emirates	49	(0)
- * Club domestic league appearances and goals

Humaid Fakher is a UAE football defender who played for United Arab Emirates in the 2004 Asian Cup. He also played for Al Ain FC and Baniyas Club
