= Daniel Coleman (footballer) =

Ghanaian football player (born 1984)

Dan Coleman
Personal information
- Full name: Daniel Coleman
- Date of birth: 1 January 1984 (age 42)
- Place of birth: Ghana
- Position: Defender

Youth career
- Hearts of Oak

Senior career*
Years	Team	Apps	(Gls)
2004–2009	Hearts of Oak		
2005–2006	Al-Nasr (loan)		
2009–2010	R.T.U.		

International career
2004–2005	Ghana	4	(0)
- * Club domestic league appearances and goals

Daniel Coleman (born 1 January 1984) is a Ghanaian football player.

== Career ==
Coleman began his career by Hearts of Oak and joined in January 2005 on loan to Al-Nasr, before turned back to Hearts in January 2006. On 30 August 2009 the Team-Captain of Hearts of Oak left his club to sign for Real Tamale United. He was sacked by his former club Real Tamale United and became a free agent.

After retirement Coleman began a music career.

== International career ==
He was part of the Ghanaian 2004 Olympic football team which exited in the first round, having finished in third place in group B. He played 2005 one game for the Ghana national football team.
