= Ali Otayf =

Saudi Arabian footballer

Personal information
- Full name: Ali Ibrahim Otayf
- Date of birth: March 1, 1988 (age 38)
- Place of birth: Saudi Arabia
- Height: 1.73 m (5 ft 8 in)
- Position: Midfielder

Youth career
- Al-Shabab

Senior career*
Years	Team	Apps	(Gls)
2007–2011	Al-Shabab		
2011–2013	Al-Raed		
2013–2014	Al-Ettifaq		
2014–2015	Al-Orobah		
2016–2017	Al-Shoulla		
- * Club domestic league appearances and goals

Ali Otayf (Arabic: علي عطيف; born on 1 March 1988) is a Saudi Arabian football player who plays as a midfielder. He played in the Pro League for Al-Shabab, Al-Raed, Al-Ettifaq and Al-Orobah.
