= 2003–04 Saudi Premier League =

Saudi Premier League
- Season: 2003–04
- Champions: Al-Shabab (4th title)
- Relegated: Al-Shoulla; Al-Khaleej
- AFC Champions League: Al-Ittihad; Al-Shabab; Al-Ahli
- Top goalscorer: Godwin Attram; Kandia Traoré (15 goals)

Statistics of the 2003–04 Saudi Premier League.

== Clubs ==
=== Stadia and locations ===
Locations of teams in the 2003-04 Saudi Professional League

Club	Location	Stadium	Head coach
Al-Ahli	Jeddah	Prince Abdullah Al-Faisal Sports City	(Brazil) Valmir Louruz
Al-Ettifaq	Dammam	Prince Mohamed bin Fahd Stadium	(Argentina) Jorge Habegger
Al-Hilal	Riyadh	King Fahd Sports City	(Tunisia) Ahmad Al-Ajlani
Al-Ittihad	Jeddah	Prince Abdullah Al-Faisal Sports City	(Brazil) Candinho
Al-Khaleej	Saihat	Al-Khaleej Club Stadium	(Saudi Arabia) Khaled Al-Marzouq
Al-Nassr	Riyadh	King Fahd Sports City	(Egypt) Mohsen Saleh
Al-Qadsiah	Khobar	Prince Saud bin Jalawi Sports City	(Slovakia) Ján Pivarník
Al-Riyadh	Riyadh	King Fahd Sports City	(Romania) Marian Mihail
Al-Shabab	Riyadh	King Fahd Sports City	(Brazil) Zé Mário
Al-Shoulla	Al-Kharj	Al-Shoulla Club Stadium	(Romania) Costică Ştefănescu
Al-Tai	Ḥaʼil	Prince Abdulaziz bin Musa'ed Sports City	(Tunisia) Karim Zouaghi
Al-Wehda	Mecca	King Abdulaziz Sports City	(Saudi Arabia) Khalid Al-Koroni

=== Foreign players ===
Club	Player 1	Player 2	Player 3	Player 4	Former players
Al-Ahli	(Brazil) Edmílson Matias	(Brazil) Kim	(Brazil) Rogério Paulista	(Uruguay) Adrian Sarkissian	(Cameroon) Nicolas Alnoudji
Al-Ettifaq	(Brazil) Arílson	(Portugal) José Soares			(Brazil) Fabiano
Al-Hilal	(The Gambia) Seyfo Soley	(Ivory Coast) Aliou Siby Badra	(Ivory Coast) Kandia Traoré	(Togo) Franck Atsou	(Chile) Mauricio Aros (The Gambia) Jatto Ceesay
Al-Ittihad	(Brazil) Dimba	(Brazil) Sérgio Ricardo	(Brazil) Tcheco	(Egypt) Islam El-Shater	(Argentina) Rolando Zárate (Brazil) Guilherme Alves
Al-Khaleej	(Brazil) Celso Costa	(Tunisia) Walid Azaïez			
Al-Nassr	(Ecuador) Otilino Tenorio	(Egypt) Emad El Nahhas	(Iraq) Nashat Akram	(Morocco) Hicham Aboucherouane	(Brazil) Marcelinho Carioca (Romania) Adrian Neaga
Al-Qadsiah	(Brazil) Jack Jones	(Brazil) Wellington	(Brazil) Zé Eduardo	(Guinea) Mamadou Sylla	(Brazil) Alex Pinho (Senegal) Mohammad Kounaté
Al-Riyadh	(Brazil) Césinha	(Senegal) Mamoun Diop			
Al-Shabab	(Brazil) Lindomar	(Ghana) Godwin Attram	(Peru) Roberto Holsen	(Senegal) Mohammed Manga	
Al-Shoulla	(Democratic Republic of the Congo) Mubama Kibwey	(Romania) Aristică Cioabă	(Sudan) Akef Ataa		
Al-Tai	(Senegal) Hamad Ji	(Senegal) Mody N'Diaye			
Al-Wehda	(Angola) Paulo Silva	(Brazil) Cleberson			

== Final league table ==
Pos	Team	Pld	W	D	L	GF	GA	GD	Pts
1	Al-Ittihad	22	17	5	0	57	15	+42	56
2	Al-Shabab	22	12	6	4	50	26	+24	42
3	Al-Hilal	22	12	4	6	40	18	+22	40
4	Al-Ahli	22	10	8	4	31	21	+10	38
5	Al-Ettifaq	22	10	5	7	34	25	+9	35
6	Al-Nassr	22	10	4	8	34	33	+1	34
7	Al-Qadsiah	22	7	5	10	25	31	−6	26
8	Al-Wehda	22	7	4	11	33	40	−7	25
9	Al-Tai	22	7	3	12	20	41	−21	24
10	Al-Riyadh	22	6	4	12	22	40	−18	22
11	Al-Shoulla	22	5	2	15	20	51	−31	17
12	Al-Khaleej	22	3	2	17	25	50	−25	11

== Championship playoff ==
=== Match against fourth place ===
23 May 2004	Al-Hilal	1–5	Al-Ahli	King Fahd Sports City, Riyadh
	Kandia Traoré 33'		20' (pen.) Hussein Abdulghani; 50' Rogério Paulista; 68' (pen.) Rogério Paulista; 80' Rogério Paulista; 85' Kim	Referee: Arturo Daudén Ibáñez

=== Match against third place ===
27 May 2004	Al-Shabab	2–1	Al-Ahli	King Fahd Sports City, Riyadh
	Godwin Attram 31'; Mohammed Manga 84'		26' Rogério Paulista	Referee: Alain Sars

=== Final ===
18 Jun 2004	Al-Ittihad	0–1	Al-Shabab	Prince Abdullah Al-Faisal Sports City, Jeddah
			81' Mohammed Manga	Referee: Massimo De Santis

Saudi Premier League
2003–04 winners
Al-Shabab
4th title

== Season statistics ==
=== Top scorers ===
Rank	Scorer	Club	Goals
1	(Ghana) Godwin Attram	Al-Shabab	15
1	(Ivory Coast) Kandia Traoré	Al-Hilal	15
3	(Angola) Paulo Silva	Al-Wehda	12
