= Kandia Traoré =

Ivorian footballer (born 1980)

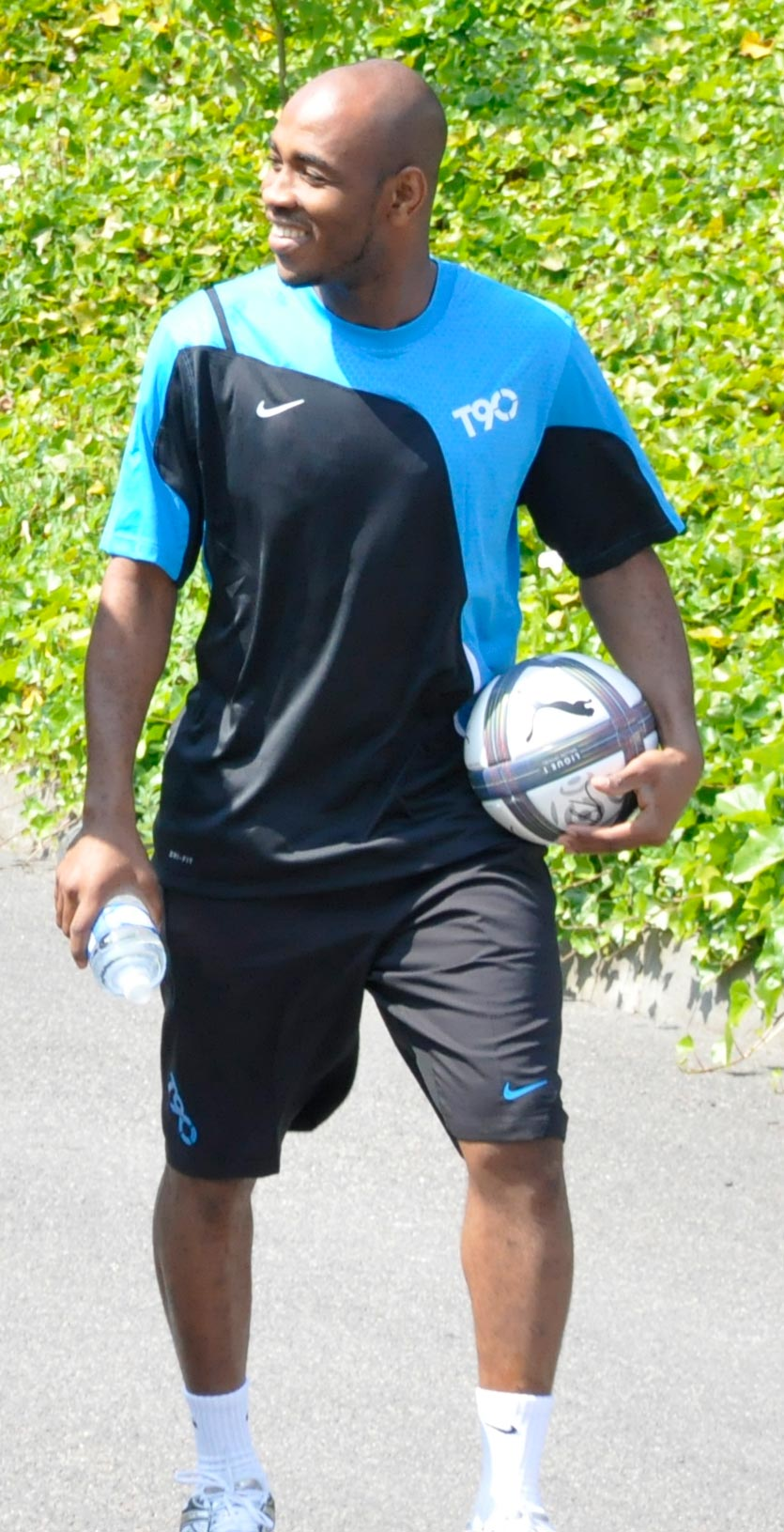
- Traoré in training in June 2010

Personal information
- Full name: Kandia Kaïn Émile Traoré
- Date of birth: 5 July 1980 (age 46)
- Place of birth: Abidjan, Ivory Coast
- Height: 1.86 m (6 ft 1 in)
- Position: Forward

Senior career*
Years	Team	Apps	(Gls)
2000–2001	Stade d'Abidjan		
2001–2002	Espérance Tunis	19	(13)
2001–2002	Étoile du Sahel	25	(18)
2003–2004	→ Al-Ain (loan)		(7)
2004	Al-Hilal	0	(0)
2004–2005	Étoile du Sahel	19	(8)
2005–2007	Le Havre	73	(32)
2007	Al-Nasr		
2008–2010	Sochaux	15	(0)
2008–2009	→ Strasbourg (loan)	31	(11)
2009–2010	→ Caen (loan)	29	(7)
2010–2013	Caen	78	(8)
2014–2015	Honvéd	11	(1)

International career
2001–2008	Ivory Coast	25	(8)
- * Club domestic league appearances and goals

Kandia Kaïn Émile Traoré (born 5 July 1980) is an Ivorian former professional footballer who played as a forward.

== Club career ==
Born in Abidjan, Traoré started his career at Tunisian club Espérance Tunis, before moving to Le Havre in 2005. In January 2008, he signed a three-and-a-half-year deal with FC Sochaux-Montbéliard. On 17 July 2009, he signed with Stade Malherbe Caen on loan for a season.

== International career ==
Following an impressive start to the 2006–07 Ligue 2 season, he was called up to the national squad for the friendly against Sweden on 15 November 2006, making his debut as a substitute. In March 2007, he was one of four players to receive a late call-up for the Ivorian's African Cup of Nations qualifier against Madagascar in Antananarivo, due to injuries to other members of the squad. He was also the member of the team at 2002 African Cup of Nations.

== Personal life ==
He holds both Ivorian and French nationalities.
