= Godwin Attram =

Ghanaian former professional footballer and manager

Personal information
- Date of birth: 7 August 1980 (age 46)
- Place of birth: Accra, Ghana
- Height: 1.73 m (5 ft 8 in)
- Position: Forward

Youth career
- 1996–1998: Great Olympics

Senior career*
| Years | Team | Apps | (Gls) |
| 1998–1999 | PSV Eindhoven | 0 | (0) |
| 1999–2001 | → Silkeborg IF (Loan) | 31 | (5) |
| 2001–2003 | Stade Tunisien | ? | (?) |
| 2003–2008 | Al-Shabab | ? | (45) |
| 2008 | → Al-Hazem (Loan) | 13 | (4) |
| 2008–2009 | Al-Shaab | 22 | (13) |
| 2009–2010 | Hatta Club | 11 | (3) |
| 2010–2012 | Smouha | 44 | (11) |
| 2012–2013 | Hajer | 14 | (1) |
| 2013 | Al Shahaniya | | |
| 2013–2014 | Dhofar | 11 | (3) |
| 2015–2019 | Great Olympics | +6 | (+4) |
| Total | | 153+ | (89+) |

International career
| 1997–2006 | Ghana | 9 | (1) |
- * Club domestic league appearances and goals

Godwin Attram (born 7 August 1980) is a Ghanaian former professional footballer who played as a forward.

== Club career ==
Godwin began his career with home-based club Great Olympics in 1996. In 1998, he moved to Dutch club PSV Eindhoven but did not feature in a single match. He was then transferred on loan to Danish club Silkeborg IF where he played a total of 31 matches scoring 5 goals.

After an unsuccessful time in Netherlands, he signed a contract with Tunisian club Stade Tunisien.

He then moved to Saudi Arabia where he played for giants Al-Shabab and scored 47 goals in a total of three seasons. He also won the top-scorer award in the 2006–07 season for scoring 13 goals. He spent a brief period with Al-Hazm in 2008 scoring 4 goals.

In 2008, he moved to UAE-based club Al-Shaab and scored 13 goals in the 2008-09 season. Then he moved to Hatta Club in 2009. In 2010, he signed a contract with Alexandria-based club Smouha. He stayed there for two seasons scoring 11 goals. In 2012, he came back to Saudi Arabia and featured for Hajer in fourteen matches. He scored the first and the only goal for the Al-Hasa-based club against the Asian giants Al-Hilal FC. On 10 September 2013, he signed a contract with Oman Professional League club Dhofar S.C.S.C.

== International career ==
He represented the Ghana national football team in 2006 African Cup of Nations wearing the number 12 jersey. He played in ten international matches and scored one goal for the national team.

== Coaching career ==
Attram founded along Piet de Visser in the Spring 2010, the Football Academy Attram De Visser Soccer Academy based in Sowutuom. In January 2020, he was appointed as the assistant coach to Ibrahim Tanko for the Ghana A' national football team. After serving in that role for 5 months, in April 2020 he was moved to the Ghana national under-23 football team to serve as the assistant coach along with Yusif Basigi to Paa Kwesi Fabin.

== Honours ==
=== Club ===
Silkeborg IF

- Danish Cup: 2000–01

Stade Tunisien

- Tunisian League Cup: 2002

Al-Shabab

- Saudi Premier League: 2003–04, 2005–06

=== International ===
- FIFA U-17 World Championship runner up: 1997

=== Individual ===
- Saudi Professional League-Top Scorer : 2003–04, 2006–07
