= Mohammed Manga =

Senegalese footballer (1977–2019)

Mohammad Manga
Personal information
- Full name: Mohammed Bachir Manga
- Date of birth: 30 March 1977
- Place of birth: Dakar, Senegal
- Date of death: 27 September 2019
- Height: 1.86 m (6 ft 1 in)
- Position: Striker

Youth career
- JA Fass

Senior career*
Years	Team	Apps	(Gls)
1993–1994	AS Douanes		
1995–1996	AS Djerba		
1996–1997	CS Hammam Lif		
1998	Al Ahli Jeddah		
1999–2003	Sdoos Club	19	(13)
2003–2005	Al Shabab Riyadh	22	(15)
2005–2006	Al Shabab Dubai		
2006–2007	Politehnica Iaşi		
2007–2008	DH El Jadida		
- * Club domestic league appearances and goals

Mohammed Manga (born Richard Manga, 30 March 1977 – 27 September 2019) was a Senegalese professional footballer who played as a striker.

== Career ==
Manga was born in Dakar, and started his career with Jeunesse amicale de Fass, before he signed at the end of the year 1993 with AS Douanes (Dakar). He started his senior career with the Dakar-based club under his birth name Richard Manga in 1994. Only a year later he left his club Douanes and signed with Tunisian side AS Djerba. He received the award for the best Goalscorer and moved in 1996 to League rival CS Hammam-Lif. He played the next two years with Hammam-Lif, before signing in 1998 in Saudi Arabia for Al-Ahli Jeddah. After a year in Jeddah he left the club and signed for Saudi Arabian second league side Sdoos Club. In 2003 he signed for Saudi Premier League club Al Shabab Riyadh and was the top scorer of the 2003–04 Saudi League with 15 goals. After two years with Al Shabab FC Riyadh, he signed for Al Shabab Al Arabi Club in Dubai. In early 2007 he moved to Romania and signed for Politehnica Iaşi. He played for the club until summer 2007 and moved to Morocco to sign for Difaâ El Jadidi.

== Personal life ==
Manga converted in 2002 to Islam and changed his name from Richard Manga to Mohamed Bachir. He played the last years of his career as Mohammad Bachir Manga.

Manga died on 27 September 2019, at the age of 42.
