= Patrick Kazadi =

Democratic Republic of the Congo footballer

Personal information
- Full name: Patrick Mawlai Kazadi
- Date of birth: 29 March 1977 (age 49)
- Place of birth: Lubumbashi, Democratic Republic of the Congo
- Height: 1.90 m (6 ft 3 in)
- Position: Striker

Youth career
- Inter Club

Senior career*
Years	Team	Apps	(Gls)
2003–2004	AS Marsa	35	(19)
2004–2006	Al Wehda	44	(21)
2006–2007	AS Marsa	36	(15)
2007–2008	EGS Gafsa	37	(20)
2008–2009	Al Khaleej	33	(16)
2009–2010	Tersanah	44	(25)
2010	AS Marsa		

International career
- DR Congo
- * Club domestic league appearances and goals as of 3 January 2010

Patrick Mawlai Kazadi (born 29 March 1977) is a DR Congolese former professional footballer who played as a striker. He has played for a variety of club teams, including A.S. Marsa and EGS Gafsa in Tunisia, Al Wehda in Saudi Arabia, Al Khaleej in the UAE, and Tersanah in Libya, as well as the DR Congo national football team.
