= 2009–10 Prince Faisal Cup =

The 2009–10 version of the Saudi Federation Cup, currently being played under the guise of Prince Faisal Cup, is the 25th edition to be played. It can be considered a League Cup competition in Saudi Arabian footballing terms.

The rules have changed from previous editions, going from an under-23 tournament to a non-age-restricted competition.

== Round one groups ==
Six groups containing between 4 and 6 clubs:

Group A	Group B	Group C	Group D	Group D
Al-Nasr; Al-Shabab; Al-Hilal; Al Shu'llah; Al-Riyadh; Al-Watani	Al-Ettifaq; Al Fateh; Al-Khaleej; Hajer Club Al Hasa; Al-Qadisiya Al Khubar; Al Adalah	Al-Ahli; Al-Wahda; Al-Ansar; Al-Ittihad; Ohud Medina	Al-Ta'ee; Al-Faisaly Harmah; Al Hazm; Al Taawon; Al Raed	Hettein; Abha; Dhamk; Najran SC
