= Malaysia national football team honours =

The Malaysia national football team (Malay: Pasukan bola sepak kebangsaan Malaysia) has represented Malaysia in international football since 1963. The team is governed by the Football Association of Malaysia (Persatuan Bola Sepak Malaysia). The national team is recognised by FIFA and RSSSF as the successor of the defunct Malaya national football team which have been absorbed along with its records by the current national team. The official FIFA code for the team is "Malaysia (MAS)".

== Men's Honours ==
Include the results of Malaya before 1962 (1948–1962)

=== Continental ===
- Asian Games

Bronze medal: 1962, 1974

=== Regional ===
- AFF Championship
  - Champions: 2010
  - Runners-up (3): 1996, 2014, 2018
  - Third place (3): 2000, 2004, 2022
- Southeast Asian Games
  - Gold medal (6): 1961, 1977, 1979, 1989, 2009, 2011
  - Silver medal (4): (1971, 1975, 1981, 1987
  - Bronze medal (5): (1959, 1969, 1973, 1983, 1985

=== Friendly tournaments ===
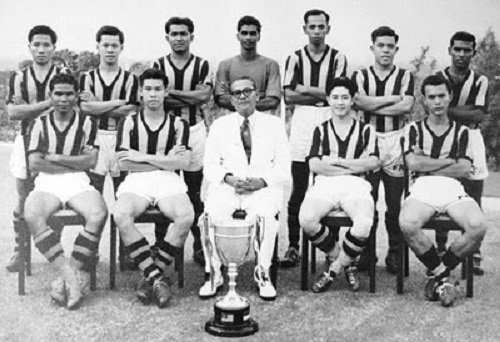
The winner of the second season of Merdeka Cup in 1958, Malaya football team, five years before the merger to form Malaysia. Also in the picture is Tunku Abdul Rahman (centre), the first Prime Minister of Malaya and at that time president of Football Association of Malaya & Asian Football Confederation.

- Pestabola Merdeka

- Winners (10): 1958, 1959, 1960*, 1968, 1973, 1974, 1976, 1979*,1986, 1993

- Runners-up (8): 1961, 1969, 1972, 1975, 1980, 2000, 2008, 2023

- King's Cup

- Winners (4): 1972, 1976*, 1977*, 1978
- Runner-up (2): 1973, 2022
- Third place (2): 1970, 1974
- Fourth place (2): 1968, 1975

- South Vietnam Independence Cup

- Winners: 1971

- Jakarta Anniversary Tournament

- Winners: 1970
- Runner-up: 1975
- Third place (2): 1971, 1974

- Indonesian Independence Cup

- Winners: 1992

- President's Gold Cup

- Runner-up: 1983

- Korea Cup

- Third place: 1977*
- Fourth place (3): 1971, 1972, 1973

- AirMarine Cup

- Third place: 2019

- FAS Tri-Nation Series

- Runner-up: 2022

*trophy shared

=== Summary ===
Overview
Event	1st place	2nd place	3rd place	4th place
FIFA World Cup	0	0	0	0
Summer Olympic Games	0	0	0	0
AFC Asian Cup	0	0	0	0
Asian Games	0	0	2	0
AFF Cup	1	3	3	1
SEA Games	4	4	5	1
Total	5	7	10	2

== Women's Honours ==
=== Continental ===
- AFC Women's Asian Cup

Third place: 1983

=== Regional ===
- Southeast Asian Games

Silver medal: 1995

=== Summary ===
Overview
Event	1st place	2nd place	3rd place	4th place
FIFA Women's World Cup	0	0	0	0
Summer Olympic Games	0	0	0	0
AFC Women's Asian Cup	0	0	1	1
Asian Games	0	0	0	0
AFF Women's Cup	0	0	0	1
SEA Games	0	1	0	2
Total	0	1	1	2

== See also ==
- Malaysia national football team results
- Football in Malaysia
