= 2018 King's Cup =

ฟุตบอลชิงถ้วยพระราชทานคิงส์คัพ 2018

Tournament details
- Host country: Thailand
- Dates: 22–25 March
- Teams: 4 (from 3 confederations)
- Venue: 1 (in 1 host city)

Final positions
- Champions: Slovakia (2nd title)
- Runners-up: Thailand
- Third place: Gabon
- Fourth place: United Arab Emirates

Tournament statistics
- Matches played: 4
- Goals scored: 9 (2.25 per match)
- Attendance: 88,236 (22,059 per match)

The 2018 Annual King's Cup Football Tournament, commonly referred to as 2018 King's Cup, was the 46th King's Cup, the annual international men's football tournament organised by Football Association of Thailand. It was held in Bangkok, Thailand, from 22 to 25 March 2018.

As hosts, Thailand participated automatically in the tournament; they were joined by the African team Gabon, the Asian team United Arab Emirates and the European team Slovakia.

== Participating teams ==
The following teams have participated for the tournament.

Country	Association	Confederation	FIFA Ranking^{1}	Previous best performance
Thailand (host)	FA Thailand	AFC	129	Champions (fifteen titles; last title: 2017)
Gabon	Gabon FF	CAF	95	Debut
Slovakia	Slovak FA	UEFA	28	Champions (2004)
United Arab Emirates	United Arab Emirates FA	AFC	78	Fourth place (2016)

- ^{1} FIFA Ranking as of 15 February 2018.

== Background ==
=== 2018 FIFA World Cup Qualifying ===
Gabon			Slovakia			Thailand			United Arab Emirates		
Opponent	Home	Away	Opponent	Home	Away	Opponent	Home	Away	Opponent	Home	Away
Ivory Coast	L 0–3	W 2–1	England	L 0–1	L 1–2	Australia	D 2–2	L 1–2	Australia	L 0–1	L 0–2
Mali	W 3–1	D 0–0	Lithuania	W 4–0	W 2–1	Iraq	L 1–2	L 0–4	Iraq	W 2–0	L 0–1
Morocco	D 0–0	L 0–3	Malta	W 3–0	W 3–1	Japan	L 0–2	L 0–4	Japan	L 0–2	W 2–1
—N/a	—N/a	—N/a	Scotland	W 3–0	L 0–1	Saudi Arabia	L 0–3	L 0–1	Saudi Arabia	W 2–1	L 0–3
—N/a	—N/a	—N/a	Slovenia	W 1–0	L 0–1	United Arab Emirates	D 1–1	L 1–3	Thailand	W 3–1	D 1–1

=== Previous King's Cup ===
Slovakia			Thailand			United Arab Emirates		
2004 King's Cup			2017 King's Cup			2016 King's Cup		
Round	Opponent	Result	Round	Opponent	Result	Round	Opponent	Result
SF	Hungary	W 1–0	SF	North Korea	W 3–0	SF	Jordan	L 1–3
F	Thailand	W 1–1 (5–4 pen.)	F	Belarus	W 1–1 (4–5 pen.)	TPO	Syria	L 0–1
Winners (1)			Winners (15)			Fourth place		

== Venue ==
Bangkok
Rajamangala Stadium
Capacity: 49,772
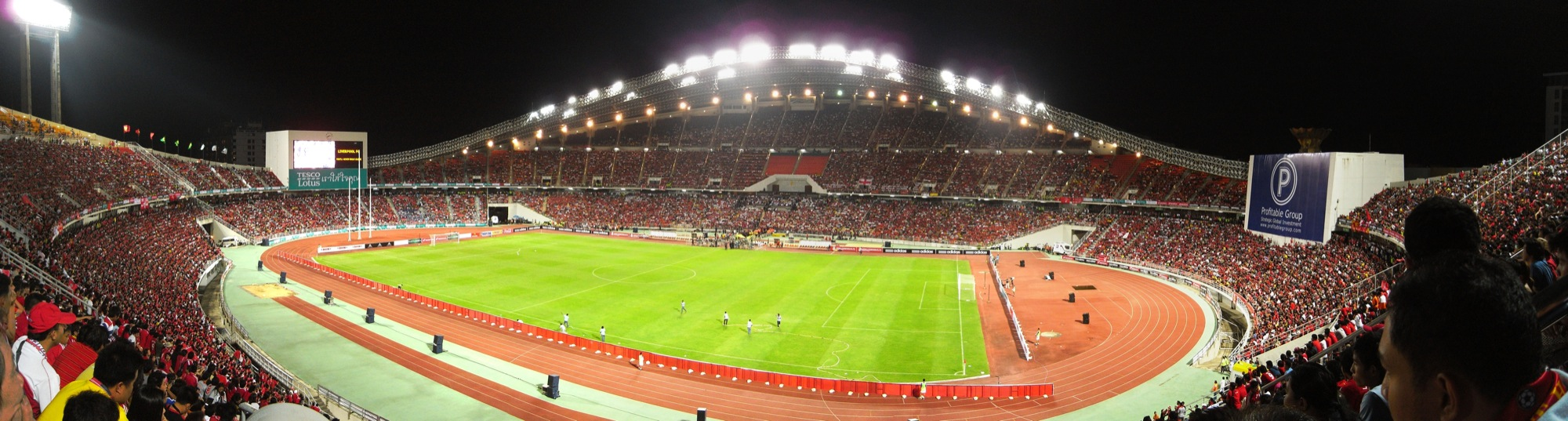

== Matches ==
All times are local, Indochina Time (UTC+7)

=== Match rules ===
- 90 minutes.
- Penalty shoot-out after a draw in 90 minutes.
- Maximum of three substitutions.

=== Bracket ===
Semi-finals
Slovakia	2
United Arab Emirates	1
22 March – Bangkok
Thailand (pen.)	0 (4)
Gabon	0 (2)

Final
25 March – Bangkok
Slovakia	3
Thailand	2
Third place play-off
25 March – Bangkok
United Arab Emirates	0
Gabon	1

=== Semi-finals ===
22 March 2018
16:30

Slovakia	2–1	United Arab Emirates
Rusnák 42'; Ďuriš 45'	Report	Khalil 73'

Rajamangala Stadium, Bangkok
Attendance: 8,360
Referee: Gopalakrishnan Letchman (Singapore)

22 March 2018
19:30

Thailand	0–0	Gabon
	Report
Penalties
Theerathon (penalty scored); Teerasil (penalty scored); Peerapat (penalty missed); Roller (penalty scored); Pansa (penalty scored)	4–2	(penalty missed) Biyogo Poko; (penalty missed) Méyé; (penalty scored) Martinsson Ngouali; (penalty scored) Bulot

Rajamangala Stadium, Bangkok
Attendance: 25,781
Referee: Suhaizi Shukri (Malaysia)

=== Third place play-off ===
25 March 2018
16:30

Gabon	1–0	United Arab Emirates
Madinda 14'	Report

Rajamangala Stadium, Bangkok
Attendance: 8,670
Referee: Gopalakrishnan Letchman (Singapore)

=== Final ===
25 March 2018
19:30

Thailand	2–3	Slovakia
Jakkaphan 42'; Pansa 79'	Report	Duda 10'; Mak 34'; Pačinda 68'

Rajamangala Stadium, Bangkok
Attendance: 45,425
Referee: Suhaizi Shukri (Malaysia)

== Winners ==
The 46th Annual King's Cup Football Tournament
champions

Slovakia
2nd title

== Final ranking ==
Pos	Team	Pld	W	D	L	GF	GA	GD	Pts	Final result
1	Slovakia	2	2	0	0	5	3	+2	6	Champions
2	Thailand (H)	2	0	1	1	2	3	−1	1	Runners-up
3	Gabon	2	1	1	0	1	0	+1	4	Third place
4	United Arab Emirates	2	0	0	2	1	3	−2	0	Fourth place

Source: FIFA
(H) Hosts

== Broadcasting rights ==
Territory	Channel	Ref
Slovakia	TV JOJ	
Thailand	Thairath TV	
