= 2023 King's Cup =

49th edition of King's Cup football tournament held in Thailand

ฟุตบอลชิงถ้วยพระราชทานคิงส์คัพ 2023

Tournament details
- Host country: Thailand
- Dates: 7–10 September 2023
- Teams: 4 (from 1 confederation)
- Venue: 1 (in 1 host city)

Final positions
- Champions: Iraq (1st title)
- Runners-up: Thailand
- Third place: Lebanon
- Fourth place: India

Tournament statistics
- Matches played: 4
- Goals scored: 12 (3 per match)
- Top scorer(s): (Iraq) Ayman Hussein (2 goals)

The 2023 Annual King's Cup Football Tournament (Thai: ฟุตบอลชิงถ้วยพระราชทานคิงส์คัพ 2023), also referred to as 2023 Thailand King's Cup, was the 49th King's Cup, the annual international men's football tournament organized by Football Association of Thailand.

As hosts, Thailand participated automatically in the tournament; they were joined by the AFC teams Iraq, Lebanon and India. Iraq became the champions after defeating Thailand by 5–4 on penalties in the final. With two goals, Aymen Hussein of Iraq was the top scorer of the tournament.

== Participating teams ==
The following teams participated in the tournament:

Country	Association	Sub-confederation	FIFA Ranking^{1}	Previous best performance
Iraq	IFA	WAFF	70	Runners-up (2007)
India	AIFF	SAFF	99	Third place (1977, 2019)
Lebanon	LFA	WAFF	100	Third place (2009)
Thailand (hosts)	FAT	AFF	113	Champions (15 titles; last title: 2017)

- ^{1} FIFA Ranking as of 20 July 2023.

== Squads ==
A final squad of 23 players (three of whom must be goalkeepers) needed to be registered.

== Venue ==
Chiang Mai
700th Anniversary Stadium
Capacity: 17,909
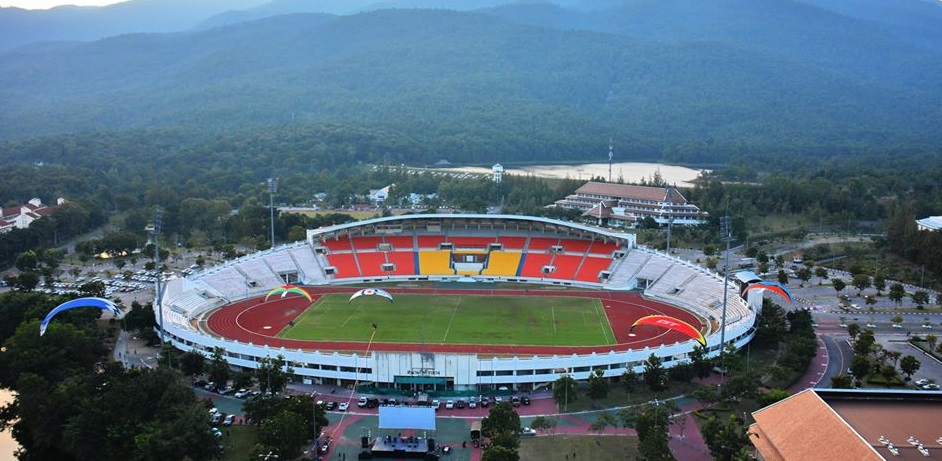

== Matches ==
=== Match rules ===
- Penalty shoot-out after a draw in 90 minutes
- Maximum of five substitutions

=== Bracket ===
Semi-finals
7 September – Chiang Mai
Thailand	2
Lebanon	1
7 September – Chiang Mai
Iraq	2 (5)
India	2 (4)

Final
10 September – Chiang Mai
Thailand	2 (4)
Iraq	2 (5)
Third place play-off
10 September – Chiang Mai
Lebanon	1
India	0

=== Semi-finals ===
7 September 2023
17:30

Iraq	2–2	India
Al-Hamadi 28' (pen.); Hussein 80' (pen.)		Mahesh 17'; Hassan 51' (o.g.)
Penalties
Doski (penalty scored); Adnan (penalty scored); H. Ali (penalty scored); Al-Hamawi (penalty scored); Resan (penalty scored)	5–4	(penalty missed) Fernandes; (penalty scored) Jhingan; (penalty scored) Suresh; (penalty scored) A. Ali; (penalty scored) R. Ali

700th Anniversary Stadium, Chiang Mai
Referee: Wiwat Jumpao-on (Thailand)

7 September 2023
20:30

Thailand	2–1	Lebanon
Ayoub 45+3' (o.g.); Teerasil 85'		Jradi 57'

700th Anniversary Stadium, Chiang Mai
Attendance: 16,583
Referee: Kim Hee-gon (South Korea)

=== Third place play-off ===
10 September 2023
17:30

Lebanon	1–0	India
El Zein 77'

700th Anniversary Stadium, Chiang Mai
Attendance: 13,567
Referee: Torphong Somsing (Thailand)

=== Final ===
10 September 2023
20:30

Thailand	2–2	Iraq
Mickelson 37'; Bordin 82'		Hussein 6'; Attwan 65'
Penalties
Kritsada (penalty scored); Thitiphan (penalty scored); Pokklaw (penalty scored); Pathompol (penalty missed); Theerathon (penalty scored)	4–5	(penalty scored) Abdulla; (penalty scored) Doski; (penalty scored) Farhan; (penalty scored) Bayesh; (penalty scored) Attwan

700th Anniversary Stadium, Chiang Mai
Attendance: 16,543
Referee: Kim Hee-gon (South Korea)

== Winners ==
The 49th Annual King's Cup Football Tournament
champions

Iraq
1st title
