= 2024 King's Cup =

International football competition in Thailand

ฟุตบอลชิงถ้วยพระราชทานคิงส์คัพ 2024

Tournament details
- Host country: Thailand
- Dates: 11–14 October 2024
- Teams: 4 (from 1 confederation)
- Venue: 1 (in 1 host city)

Final positions
- Champions: Thailand (16th title)
- Runners-up: Syria
- Third place: Philippines
- Fourth place: Tajikistan

Tournament statistics
- Matches played: 4
- Goals scored: 11 (2.75 per match)
- Top scorer(s): (Thailand) Suphanat Mueanta (Thailand) Chanathip Songkrasin (2 goals each)

The 2024 Annual King's Cup Football Tournament (Thai: ฟุตบอลชิงถ้วยพระราชทานคิงส์คัพ 2024), also referred to as 2024 King's Cup, is the 50th King's Cup, the annual international men's football tournament organized by Football Association of Thailand.

As hosts, Thailand participated automatically in the tournament; they were joined by the AFC teams Tajikistan, Syria, and Philippines.

The tournament will be hosted in the Songkhla province. Chiang Rai and Chiang Mai also made bids to host the King's Cup.

== Participating teams ==
The following teams participated in the tournament:

| Country | Association | Sub-confederation | FIFA Ranking^{1} | Previous best performance |
|---|---|---|---|---|
| Thailand (hosts) | FAT | AFF | 100 | Champions (15 titles; last title: 2017) |
| Tajikistan | TFF | CAFA | 103 | Champions (2022) |
| Syria | SFA | WAFF, UAFA | 92 | Third place (2016) |
| Philippines | PFF | AFF | 148 | Group stage (1982) |

== Venue ==
Songkhla
Tinsulanon Stadium
Capacity: 20,000
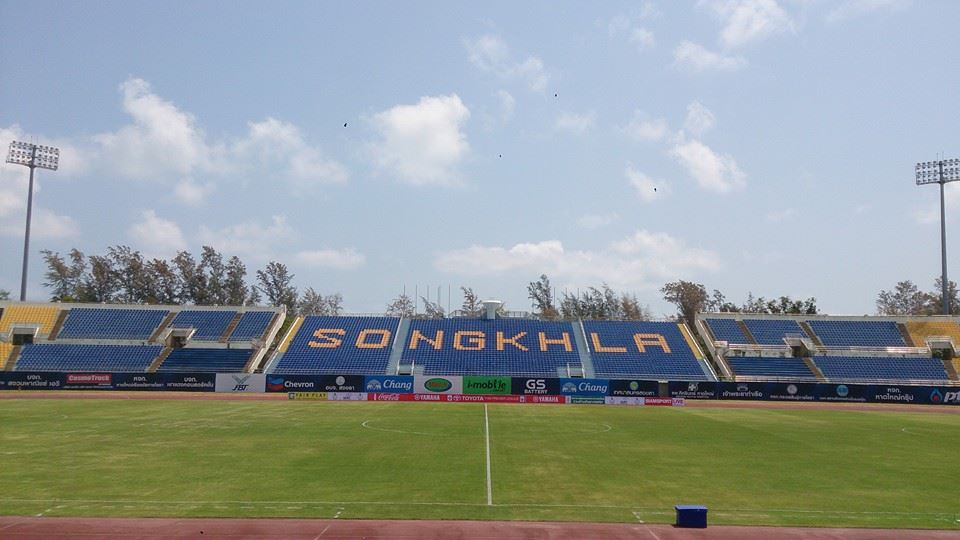

== Competition rules ==
- 90 minutes
- Penalty shootout Draw in 90 minutes, no extra time
- Substitute up to 5 players
- VAR available for very first time in this edition

== Knockout stage ==
Semi-final
11 October 2024 16:30 – Songkhla
Syria | 1
Tajikistan | 0
11 October 2024 20:00 – Songkhla
Thailand | 3
Philippines | 1

Final
14 October 2024 20:00 – Songkhla
Syria | 1
Thailand | 2
Third place play-off
14 October 2024 16:30 – Songkhla
Tajikistan | 0
Philippines | 3

=== Semi-finals ===
11 October 2024
16:30 UTC+7

| Syria | 1–0 | Tajikistan |
|---|---|---|
| Osman 35' | Report |

Tinsulanon Stadium, Songkhla
Attendance: 13,588
Referee: Wiwat Jumpao-on (Thailand)
11 October 2024
20:00 UTC+7

| Thailand | 3–1 | Philippines |
|---|---|---|
| Chanathip 53'; Suphanat 68', 88' | Report | Kristensen 63' |

Tinsulanon Stadium, Songkhla
Attendance: 19,506
Referee: Ngô Duy Lân (Vietnam)

=== Third place ===
14 October 2024
16:30 UTC+7

| Tajikistan | 0–3 | Philippines |
|---|---|---|
| | Report | Holtmann 47'; J. Tabinas 58'; Bailey 62' |

Tinsulanon Stadium, Songkhla
Attendance: 9,664
Referee: Warintorn Sassadee (Thailand)

=== Final ===
14 October 2024
20:00 UTC+7

| Thailand | 2–1 | Syria |
|---|---|---|
| Ekanit 44'; Chanathip 90+1' | Report | Ham 53' |

Tinsulanon Stadium, Songkhla
Attendance: 24,121
Referee: Jansen Foo Chuan Hui (Singapore)

== Winners ==
The 50th Annual King's Cup Football Tournament
champions

Thailand
16th title

== Official match ball ==
Molten F5N5000-TH
