= King's Cup (Thailand) =

International football tournament in Thailand

King's Cup ฟุตบอลชิงถ้วยพระราชทานคิงส์คัพ
- Organiser(s): Football Association of Thailand
- Founded: 1968; 58 years ago
- Region: International
- Teams: 4
- Current champions: Thailand (17th title)
- Most championships: Thailand (17 titles)
- 2026 King's Cup

The King's Cup is an international football tournament held in Thailand, organised by the Football Association of Thailand. The winner of the competition is given the royal trophy by the King of Thailand. The host, Thailand, is a participant in every edition. The tournament was founded in 1968, and has been held every year since, with the exception of 1983, 1985, 2008, 2011, 2014, 2020 and 2021.

In some years, the competition has featured club or invitational teams as well as international sides. Various prominent footballers have participated in this tournament, including Aymen Hussein, Cha Bum-kun, Sunil Chhetri, Peter Schmeichel, Jesper Olsen, Brian Laudrup, Cafu, Dida, Juninho, Rivaldo, Roberto Carlos, Ronaldinho, Henrik Larsson, Kamil Glik, Robert Lewandowski, Martin Škrtel, Martin Dúbravka, Milan Škriniar, Stanislav Lobotka, Cuco Martina and Pierre-Emerick Aubameyang. Since 2018, the King's Cup will only feature the senior national team.

== Venues ==
Known venues for the King's Cup since the year 2000.

Image	Stadium	Capacity	Location	Year(s)
	Rajamangala National Stadium	49,722	Bangkok	2000, 2007, 2012, 2016–2018
	Suphachalasai Stadium	19,793	Bangkok	2001–2004, 2006
	Surakul Stadium	15,000	Phuket	2005, 2009
	80th Birthday Stadium	24,641	Nakhon Ratchasima	2009, 2010, 2015
	700th Anniversary Stadium	25,000	Chiang Mai	2013, 2022–2023
	Chang Arena	32,600	Buriram	2019
	Tinsulanon Stadium	30,000	Songkhla	2024
	Kanchanaburi Province Stadium	13,000	Kanchanaburi	2025
	Sisaket Province Stadium	12,000	Sisaket	2026

== Results ==
Edition	Year	Winners	Score	Runners-up	Third place	Score	Fourth place
1	1968	Indonesia	1−0	Burma	Thailand	6−0	Malaysia
2	1969	South Korea	1−0	Indonesia	South Vietnam	7−0	Laos
3	1970	South Korea	1−0	Thailand	Malaysia	3−1	Indonesia
4	1971	South Korea	1−0	Thailand	South Vietnam	3−2	Indonesia
Edition	Year	Winners	Score	Runners-up	Co-Third place	Score	Co-Third place
5	1972	Malaysia	1−0	Thailand	South Korea	0−0	Singapore
Edition	Year	Winners	Score	Runners-up	Third place	Score	Fourth place
6	1973	South Korea	2−1	Malaysia	Thailand	1−0	Burma
7	1974	South Korea	3−1 (a.e.t.)	Thailand	Malaysia	3−0	Khmer Republic
8	1975	South Korea	1−0	Burma	Thailand	No playoffs	Malaysia
Edition	Year	Co-Winners	Score	Co-Winners	Third place	Score	Fourth place
9	1976	Thailand	1−1	Malaysia	South Korea	3−1	Thailand B
10	1977	South Korea B	1−1	Malaysia	India	No playoffs	Thailand
Edition	Year	Winners	Score	Runners-up	Third place	Score	Fourth place
11	1978	Malaysia	3−2	Singapore	South Korea B	2−1	Thailand
Edition	Year	Winners	Score	Runners-up	Co-Third place	Score	Co-Third place
12	1979	Thailand	1−0	South Korea B	Thailand B	2−2	Singapore
Edition	Year	Co-Winners	Score	Co-Winners	Co-Third place	Score	Co-Third place
13	1980	Thailand	0−0	South Korea Army	China	2−2	Thailand B
Edition	Year	Winners	Score	Runners-up	Third place	Score	Fourth place
14	1981	Thailand	2−1 (a.e.t.)	(North Korea); North Korean Army	(Poland); Polonia Warsaw	2−0	(China); August 1
15	1982	Thailand	0−0 (a.e.t.) (4–3 p)	South Korea	Thailand B	0−0 (3−2 p)	Singapore
—	1983	Not held					
16	1984	Thailand	3−0	Indonesia	Western Australia	1−0	(England); Liverpool Amateur
—	1985	Not held					
17	1986	North Korea	2−1	(Denmark); AGF	Thailand	1−0	(China); August 1
18	1987	North Korea	1−0	(South Korea); POSCO Atoms	Thailand	3−2	Indonesia
19	1988	Denmark Olympic	1−0	(Austria); Swarovski Tirol	Thailand	4−2	USSR XI
20	1989	Thailand	3−1	(Soviet Union); Rotor Volgograd	(South Korea); Lucky-Goldstar FC	2−1	China
21	1990	Thailand	2−1 (a.e.t.)	(Soviet Union); Rotor Volgograd	(South Korea); Yukong Elephants	0−0 (5−4 p)	(China); Shanghai
22	1991	China Olympic	3−1	(Soviet Union); Rotor Volgograd	Thailand	0−0 (5−4 p)	Thailand Olympic
23	1992	Thailand	2−0	(Germany); Berliner Dynamo	Thailand B	1−0	(China); Tianjin
24	1993	China	4−0	Thailand	South Korea Semi-professional XI	0−0 (6−5 p)	Thailand Olympic
25	1994	Thailand B	4−0	(Germany); Westfalia Amateurs	(Russia); Rotor Volgograd	0−0 (5−3 p)	Thailand
Edition	Year	Winners	Score	Runners-up	Co-Third place	Score	Co-Third place
26	1995	(Russia); Rotor Volgograd	3−0	Japan XI	Thailand	No playoffs	Thailand B
Edition	Year	Winners	Score	Runners-up	Third place	Score	Fourth place
27	1996	Romania	2−1	Denmark	Thailand	5−2	Finland
28	1997	Sweden (Scandinavian leagues)	2−0	Thailand	Japan XI	3−1	Romanian League XI
29	1998	South Korea	0−0 (6−5 p)	Egypt	Denmark B	3−0	Thailand
30	1999	Brazil U20	7−1	North Korea	Thailand	3−1	Hungarian League XI
31	2000	Thailand	5−1	Finland	Brazil U17	1−0	Estonia
32	2001	Sweden (Scandinavian leagues)	3−0	China	Thailand	2−0	Qatar
33	2002	North Korea	0−0 (4–3 p)	Thailand	Qatar	2−0	Singapore
34	2003	Sweden (Scandinavian leagues)	4−0	North Korea	Thailand	3−1	Qatar
35	2004	Slovakia	1−1 (5–4 p)	Thailand	Hungary	5−0	Estonia
36	2005	Latvia	2−1	North Korea	Thailand	No playoffs	Oman
37	2006	Thailand	3−1	Vietnam	Kazakhstan	No playoffs	Singapore
38	2007	Thailand	1−0	Iraq B	North Korea	No playoffs	Uzbekistan
—	2008	Not held					
39	2009	Denmark League XI	2−2 (5–3 p)	Thailand	Lebanon	1−0	North Korea
40	2010	Denmark	No playoffs	Poland	Thailand	No playoffs	Singapore
—	2011	Not held					
41	2012	South Korea U23	No playoffs	Denmark League XI	Norway	No playoffs	Thailand
Edition	Year	Winners	Score	Runners-up	Co-Third place	Score	Co-Third place
42	2013	Sweden (Scandinavian leagues)	3−0	Finland (Scandinavian leagues)	Thailand	2−2	North Korea
Edition	Year	Winners	Score	Runners-up	Third place	Score	Fourth place
—	2014	Not held					
43	2015	South Korea U23	No playoffs	Thailand	Uzbekistan U23	No playoffs	Honduras U20
44	2016	Thailand	2−0	Jordan	Syria	1−0	United Arab Emirates
45	2017	Thailand	0−0 (5–4 p)	Belarus B	Burkina Faso	3−3 (7–6 p)	North Korea
46	2018	Slovakia	3−2	Thailand	Gabon	1−0	United Arab Emirates
47	2019	Curaçao	1−1 (5−4 p)	Vietnam	India	1−0	Thailand
—	2020	Not held					
—	2021	Not held					
48	2022	Tajikistan	0−0 (3−0 p)	Malaysia	Thailand	2−1	Trinidad and Tobago
49	2023	Iraq	2−2 (5−4 p)	Thailand	Lebanon	1−0	India
50	2024	Thailand	2−1	Syria	Philippines	3−0	Tajikistan
51	2025	Iraq	1−0	Thailand	Hong Kong	8−0	Fiji
52	2026	Thailand	3−0	Tajikistan	Oman	7−0	Brunei
53	2027						

== Results by team ==
Team	Winners	Runners-up	Third place	Fourth place
Thailand	17 (1976^{*}, 1979, 1980^{*}, 1981, 1982, 1984, 1989, 1990, 1992, 2000, 2006, 2007, 2016, 2017, 2024, 2026)	13 (1970, 1971, 1972, 1974, 1993, 1997, 2002, 2004, 2009, 2015, 2018, 2023, 2025)	16 (1968, 1973, 1975, 1986, 1987, 1988, 1991, 1995^{**}, 1996, 1999, 2001, 2003, 2005, 2010, 2013^{**}, 2022)	6 (1977, 1978, 1994, 1998, 2012, 2019)
South Korea	7 (1969, 1970, 1971, 1973, 1974, 1975, 1998)	1 (1982)	2 (1972^{**}, 1976)	
Malaysia	4 (1972, 1976^{*}, 1977^{*}, 1978)	2 (1973, 2022)	2 (1970, 1974)	2 (1968, 1975)
Sweden^{1}	4 (1997, 2001, 2003, 2013)			
North Korea	3 (1986, 1987, 2002)	3 (1999, 2003, 2005)	2 (2007, 2013^{**})	2 (2012, 2017)
South Korea U23	2 (2012, 2015)			
Slovakia	2 (2004, 2018)			
Iraq	2 (2023, 2025)			
(Soviet Union) (Russia) Rotor Volgograd	1 (1995)	3 (1989, 1990, 1991)	1 (1994)	
Indonesia	1 (1968)	2 (1969, 1984)		3 (1970, 1971, 1987)
China	1 (1993)	1 (2001)	1 (1980^{**})	1 (1989)
South Korea B	1 (1977^{*})	1 (1979)	1 (1978)	
Denmark	1 (2010)	1 (1996)	1 (1998) B	
Tajikistan	1 (2022)	1 (2026)		1 (2024)
Denmark League XI	1 (2009)	1 (2012)		
Thailand B	1 (1994)		5 (1979^{**}, 1980^{**}, 1982, 1992, 1995^{**})	1 (1976)
Romania	1 (1996)			1 (1997)
South Korea Army	1 (1980)			
Denmark Olympic	1 (1988)			
China Olympic	1 (1991)			
Brazil U20	1 (1999)			
Latvia	1 (2005)			
Curaçao	1 (2019)			
Burma		2 (1968, 1975)		1 (1973)
Finland^{1}		2 (2000, 2013)		1 (1996)
Vietnam		2 (2006, 2019)		
Singapore		1 (1978)	2 (1972^{**}, 1979^{**})	3 (1982, 2002, 2010)
Japan XI		1 (1995)	1 (1997)	
Syria		1 (2024)	1 (2016)	
(North Korea) North Korean Army		1 (1981)		
(Denmark) AGF		1 (1986)		
(South Korea) POSCO Atoms		1 (1987)		
(Austria) Swarovski Tirol		1 (1988)		
(Germany) Berliner Dynamo		1 (1992)		
(Germany) Westfalia Amateurs		1 (1994)		
Egypt		1 (1998)		
Iraq B		1 (2007)		
Poland		1 (2010)		
Jordan		1 (2016)		
Belarus League		1 (2017)		
India			2 (1977, 2019)	1 (2023)
South Vietnam			2 (1969, 1971)	
Lebanon			2 (2009, 2023)	
Qatar			1 (2002)	2 (2001, 2003)
Oman			1 (2026)	1 (2005)
(Poland) Polonia Warsaw			1 (1981)	
Western Australia			1 (1984)	
(South Korea) Lucky-Goldstar			1 (1989)	
(South Korea) Yukong Elephants			1 (1990)	
South Korea Semi-professional XI			1 (1993)	
Brazil U17			1 (2000)	
Hungary			1 (2004)	
Kazakhstan			1 (2006)	
Norway			1 (2012)	
Uzbekistan Olympic			1 (2015)	
Syria B			1 (2016)	
Burkina Faso			1 (2017)	
Gabon			1 (2018)	
Philippines			1 (2024)	
Hong Kong			1 (2025)	
(China) August 1				2 (1981, 1986)
Thailand Olympic				2 (1991, 1993)
Estonia				2 (2000, 2004)
United Arab Emirates				2 (2016, 2018)
Laos				1 (1969)
Khmer Republic				1 (1974)
(England) Liverpool Amateur				1 (1984)
USSR XI				1 (1988)
(China) Shanghai				1 (1990)
(China) Tianjin				1 (1992)
Hungarian League XI				1 (1999)
Uzbekistan				1 (2007)
Honduras U20				1 (2015)
Trinidad and Tobago				1 (2022)
Fiji				1 (2025)
Brunei				1 (2026)

*/** Trophy or position shared
^{1} Sweden and Finland represented players from Scandinavian leagues only

== Medal table ==
As of 2026 King's Cup

Rank	Nation	Gold	Silver	Bronze	Total
1	Thailand	17	13	21	51
2	South Korea	11	3	6	20
3	Malaysia	4	2	2	8
4	Sweden	4	0	0	4
5	North Korea	3	4	2	9
6	Denmark	3	3	1	7
7	China	2	1	1	4
8	Iraq	2	1	0	3
9	Slovakia	2	0	0	2
10	Russia	1	3	1	5
11	Indonesia	1	2	0	3
12	Tajikistan	1	1	0	2
13	Brazil	1	0	1	2
14	Curaçao	1	0	0	1
14	Latvia	1	0	0	1
14	Romania	1	0	0	1
17	Finland	0	2	0	2
17	Germany	0	2	0	2
17	Myanmar	0	2	0	2
17	Vietnam	0	2	0	2
21	Singapore	0	1	2	3
22	Japan	0	1	1	2
22	Oman	0	1	1	2
22	Poland	0	1	1	2
22	Syria	0	1	1	2
26	Austria	0	1	0	1
26	Belarus	0	1	0	1
26	Egypt	0	1	0	1
26	Jordan	0	1	0	1
30	India	0	0	2	2
30	Lebanon	0	0	2	2
30	South Vietnam	0	0	2	2
33	Australia	0	0	1	1
33	Burkina Faso	0	0	1	1
33	Gabon	0	0	1	1
33	Hong Kong	0	0	1	1
33	Hungary	0	0	1	1
33	Kazakhstan	0	0	1	1
33	Norway	0	0	1	1
33	Philippines	0	0	1	1
33	Qatar	0	0	1	1
33	Uzbekistan	0	0	1	1
Totals (42 entries)		55	50	57	162

- Note 1: Gold shared in 1976, 1977 and 1980 and not awarded silver in this years.
- Note 2: Third place shared in 1972, 1979, 1980, 1995 and 2013.

== Participated nations ==
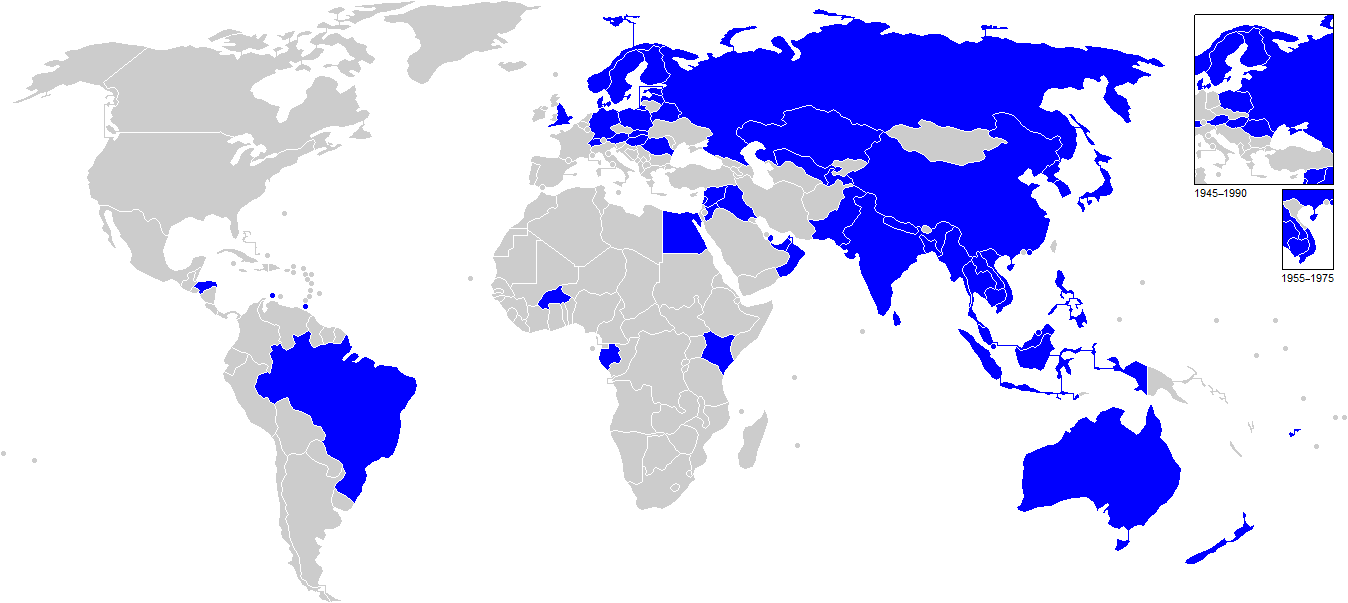
The map shows countries who have participated in King's Cup.
