= 2025 King's Cup =

International football competition in Thailand

ฟุตบอลชิงถ้วยพระราชทานคิงส์คัพ 2025

Tournament details
- Host country: Thailand
- Dates: 4–7 September
- Teams: 4 (from 2 confederations)
- Venue: 1 (in 1 host city)

Final positions
- Champions: Iraq (2nd title)
- Runners-up: Thailand
- Third place: Hong Kong
- Fourth place: Fiji

Tournament statistics
- Matches played: 4
- Goals scored: 15 (3.75 per match)
- Top scorer: (Iraq) Mohanad Ali (3 goals)

The 2025 Annual King's Cup Football Tournament (Thai: ฟุตบอลชิงถ้วยพระราชทานคิงส์คัพ 2025), also referred to as 2025 King's Cup, was the 51st King's Cup, the annual international men's football tournament organized by Football Association of Thailand.

As hosts, Thailand participated automatically in the tournament.

== Participating teams ==
The following teams participated in the tournament:

Country	Association	Sub-confederation	FIFA Ranking^{1}	Previous best performance
Thailand (hosts)	FAT	AFF	102	Champions (16 titles; last title: 2024)
Iraq	IFA	WAFF	58	Champions (2023)
Hong Kong	HKFA	EAFF	147	Group stage (1970)
Fiji	FFA	OFC	150	Debut

- ^{1} FIFA Ranking as of 10 July 2025.

== Venue ==
Kanchanaburi
Kanchanaburi Province Stadium
Capacity: 13,000
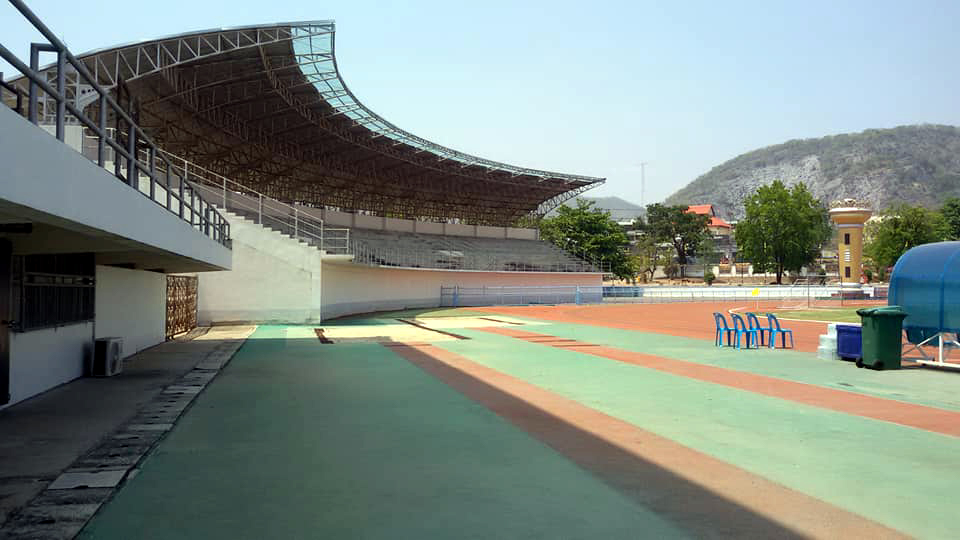

== Competition rules ==
- 90 minutes
- Penalty shootout Draw in 90 minutes, no extra time
- Substitute up to 5 players
- VAR available for all matches

== Knockout stage ==
=== Bracket ===
Semi-finals
4 September – Kanchanaburi
Iraq	2
Hong Kong	1
4 September – Kanchanaburi
Thailand	3
Fiji	0

Final
7 September – Kanchanaburi
Thailand	0
Iraq	1
Third place
7 September – Kanchanaburi
Fiji	0
Hong Kong	8

=== Semi-finals ===
4 September 2025
16:00 UTC+7

Iraq	2–1	Hong Kong
Ali 67', 80'	Report	Orr 61' (pen.)

Kanchanaburi Province Stadium, Kanchanaburi
Referee: Mongkolchai Pechsri (Thailand)
4 September 2025
20:00 UTC+7

Thailand	3–0	Fiji
Davis 11'; Teerasak 17'; Poramet 47'	Report

Kanchanaburi Province Stadium, Kanchanaburi
Attendance: 12,545
Referee: Muhammad Taqi (Singapore)

=== Third place play-off ===
7 September 2025
16:00 UTC+7

Fiji	0–8	Hong Kong
	Report	Yu Joy Yin 18', 42'; Juninho 27', 45'; Merkies 40'; Ayman 50' (o.g.); Everton 74'; Chan Siu Kwan 77'

Kanchanaburi Province Stadium, Kanchanaburi
Attendance: 3,275
Referee: Torphong Somsing (Thailand)

=== Final ===
7 September 2025
20:00 UTC+7

Thailand	0–1	Iraq
	Report	Ali 75'

Kanchanaburi Province Stadium, Kanchanaburi
Attendance: 13,987
Referee: Nazmi Nasaruddin (Malaysia)
