= Ezequiel Ham =

Syrian footballer (born 1994)

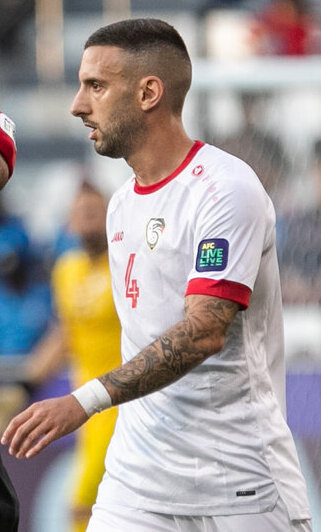
- Ham playing for Syria at the 2023 AFC Asian Cup

Personal information
- Full name: Alessio Ezequiel Naim Ham
- Date of birth: 10 March 1994 (age 32)
- Place of birth: Buenos Aires, Argentina
- Height: 1.73 m (5 ft 8 in)
- Position: Midfielder

Team information
- Current team: Atlético Tucumán
- Number: 8

Youth career
- Argentinos Juniors

Senior career*
Years	Team	Apps	(Gls)
2014–2020	Argentinos Juniors	19	(2)
2018	→ FC Gifu (loan)	1	(0)
2020	→ Santamarina (loan)	2	(0)
2020–2023	Olimpo	44	(2)
2023–2025	Independiente Rivadavia	65	(4)
2025	Unión Santa Fe	15	(1)
2025–2026	Atlético Goianiense	12	(0)
2026–	Atlético Tucumán	19	(0)

International career^{‡}
2023–	Syria	14	(1)
- * Club domestic league appearances and goals as of 17:32, 9 November 2026 (UTC) ‡ National team caps and goals as of 14 October 2024

Alessio Ezequiel Naim Ham (Arabic: إزيكييل هام; born 10 March 1994) is a professional footballer who plays as a midfielder for Atlético Tucumán. Born in Argentina, he represents the Syria national team.

== Club career ==
Ham was promoted into the first-team of Argentine Primera División side Argentinos Juniors in March 2014 and subsequently made his professional debut on 28 March versus Belgrano. Another appearance followed in 2013–14 against River Plate. His first senior goal came on 22 August 2015 in the Primera División against San Lorenzo. He scored again four games later in a match with Boca Juniors on 19 September 2015, but was later subbed off after breaking his leg following a challenge with Carlos Tevez. After 610 days out, Ham made his return in a Primera B Nacional draw with Almagro on 22 May 2017.

In January 2018, Ham completed a loan move to Japan to join J2 League team FC Gifu. He belatedly made his first appearance on 23 September versus Tokyo Verdy. He departed the club on 23 November. Upon returning to Argentinos Juniors, Ham suffered another serious injury after rupturing his cruciate knee ligaments in a reserve match with Vélez Sarsfield. After recovering, Ham left on loan in February 2020 to Primera B Nacional's Santamarina. He debuted on 15 February versus Deportivo Riestra, prior to a second appearance against Defensores de Belgrano a month later; though the season was soon curtailed.

In October 2020, Ham joined Olimpo of Torneo Federal A on a free transfer.

== International career ==
Born in Argentina, Ham is of Syrian descent through a great-grandparent. In October 2023, Ham was called up to play for the Syria national team.

On 14 October 2024, Ham scored his first international goal in the 2024 King's Cup final match against Thailand at the Tinsulanon Stadium, which ended in a 2–1 defeat.

== Career statistics ==
As of 19 January 2021.

Club statistics
Club	Season	League			Cup		League Cup		Continental		Other		Total	
Club	Season	Division	Apps	Goals	Apps	Goals	Apps	Goals	Apps	Goals	Apps	Goals	Apps	Goals
Argentinos Juniors	2013–14	Primera División	2	0	0	0	—		—		0	0	2	0
Argentinos Juniors	2014	Primera B Nacional	6	0	1	0	—		—		0	0	7	0
Argentinos Juniors	2015	Primera División	8	2	1	0	—		—		0	0	9	2
Argentinos Juniors	2016	Primera División	0	0	0	0	—		—		0	0	0	0
Argentinos Juniors	2016–17	Primera B Nacional	3	0	0	0	—		—		0	0	3	0
Argentinos Juniors	2017–18	Primera División	0	0	0	0	—		—		0	0	0	0
Argentinos Juniors	2018–19	Primera División	0	0	0	0	0	0	0	0	0	0	0	0
Argentinos Juniors	2019–20	Primera División	0	0	0	0	0	0	0	0	0	0	0	0
Argentinos Juniors	Total		19	2	2	0	0	0	0	0	0	0	21	2
FC Gifu (loan)	2018	J2 League	1	0	0	0	—		—		0	0	1	0
Santamarina (loan)	2019–20	Primera B Nacional	2	0	0	0	—		—		0	0	2	0
Olimpo	2020	Torneo Federal A	5	0	0	0	—		—		0	0	5	0
Career total			27	2	2	0	0	0	0	0	0	0	29	2

=== International ===
As of match played 14 October 2024

Scores and results list the Syria' goal tally first, score column indicates score after each Ham goal.

List of international goals scored by Ezequiel Ham
No.	Date	Venue	Opponent	Score	Result	Competition
1	14 October 2024	Tinsulanon Stadium, Songkhla, Thailand	Thailand	1–1	1–2	2024 King's Cup

== Honours ==
Argentinos Juniors

- Primera B Nacional: 2016–17

Independiente Rivadavia

- Primera Nacional: 2023
