= 2005 King's Cup =

Tournament details
- Host country: Thailand
- Dates: 24–30 December
- Teams: 4 (from 2 confederations)
- Venues: 3 (in 3 host cities)

Final positions
- Champions: Latvia (1st title)
- Runners-up: North Korea
- Third place: Thailand
- Fourth place: Oman

Tournament statistics
- Matches played: 7
- Goals scored: 16 (2.29 per match)

The 2005 King's Cup finals were held from 24 to 30 December 2005, the final being held at the Surakul Stadium in Phuket. Group phase games were also held in Krabi Stadium, Krabi and Phang Nga Stadium, Phang Nga. The King's Cup (คิงส์คัพ) is an annual football tournament; the first tournament was played in 1968.

Latvia won the tournament defeating North Korea 2–1 in the final. Hosts Thailand and Oman were the other teams to play in this tournament.

== Venue ==
Phuket
Surakul Stadium
Capacity: 16,000
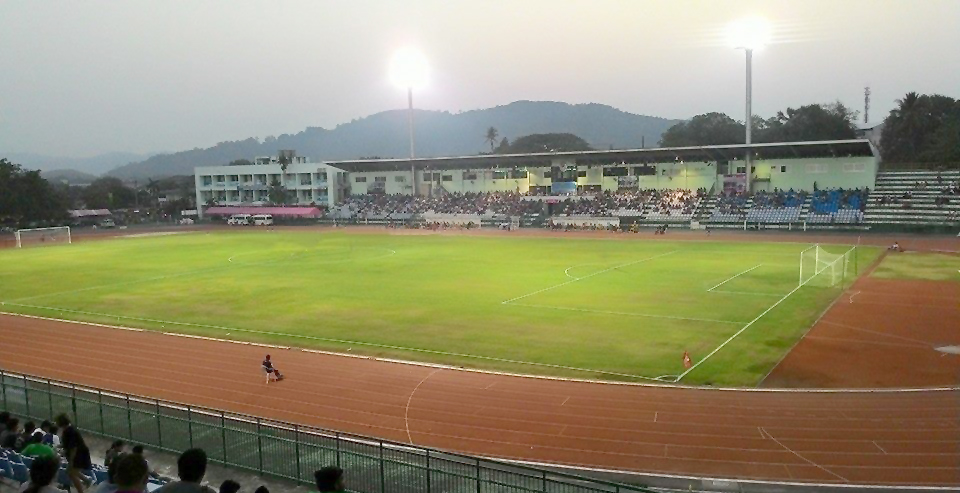

== Matches ==
=== Round robin tournament ===
Team	Pld	W	D	L	GF	GA	GD	Pts
Latvia	3	1	2	0	4	3	+1	5
North Korea	3	1	1	1	4	3	+1	4
Thailand	3	1	1	1	2	3	−1	4
Oman	3	1	0	2	3	4	−1	3

Source: RSSSF
24 December 2005
17:00 UTC+7

Thailand	1–1	Latvia

Surakul Stadium, Phuket

24 December 2005
19:15 UTC+7

Oman	2–1	North Korea

Surakul Stadium, Phuket

26 December 2005
16:30 UTC+7

North Korea	1–1	Latvia

Surakul Stadium, Phuket

26 December 2005
18:45 UTC+7

Thailand	1–0	Oman

Surakul Stadium, Phuket

28 December 2005
16:30 UTC+7

Oman	1–2	Latvia

Surakul Stadium, Phuket

28 December 2005
18:45 UTC+7

Thailand	0–2	North Korea

Surakul Stadium, Phuket

=== Final ===
30 December 2005
18:00 UTC+7

Latvia	2–1	North Korea

Surakul Stadium, Phuket

== Winner ==
2005 King's Cup champion

Latvia
1st title
