= Mongkol Tossakrai =

Thai footballer

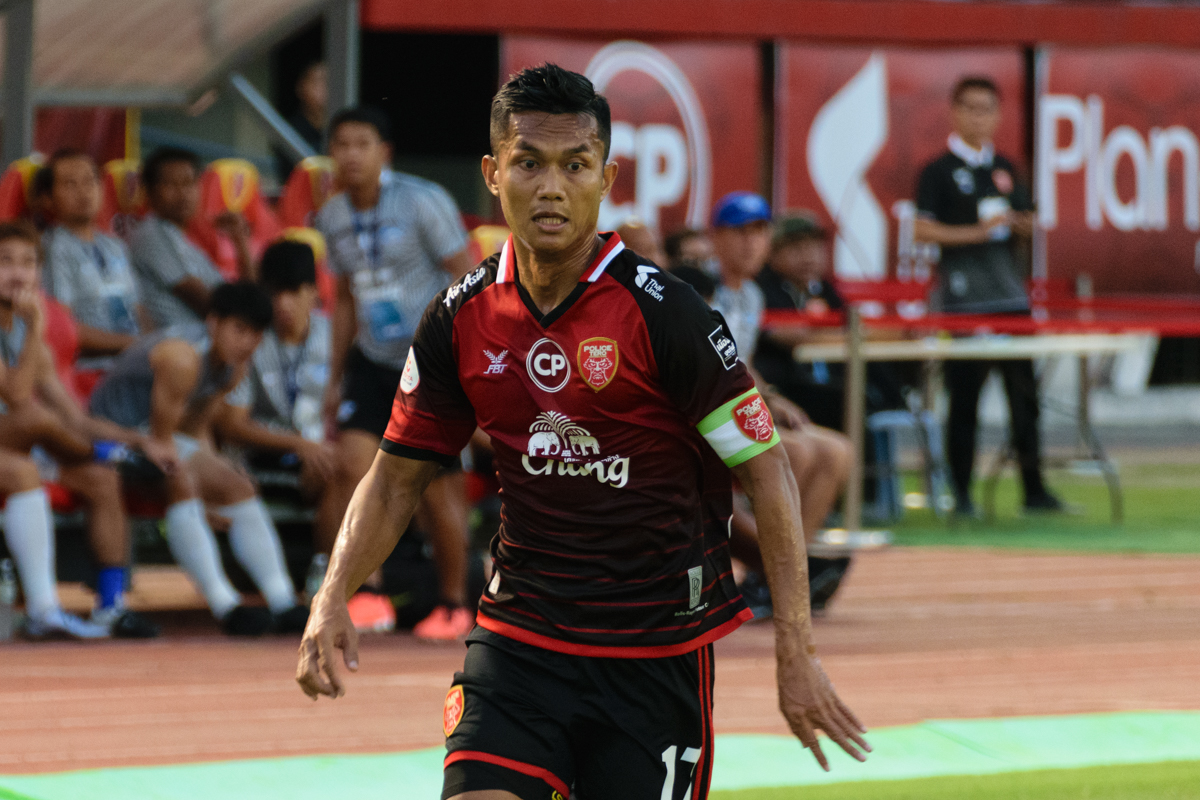

Personal information
- Full name: Mongkol Tossakrai
- Date of birth: 9 May 1987 (age 39)
- Place of birth: Khon Kaen, Thailand
- Height: 1.79 m (5 ft 10 1/2 in)
- Positions: Right winger; second striker

Youth career
- 2000–2005: Ang Thong Sports School
- 2006–2008: Krung Thai Bank

Senior career*
Years	Team	Apps	(Gls)
2008	Krung Thai Bank	2	(1)
2009–2016	Army United	111	(20)
2012	→ PTT Rayong (loan)	19	(4)
2016–2018	Chiangrai United	10	(0)
2017	→ Muangthong United (loan)	15	(4)
2017	→ Pattaya United (loan)	11	(1)
2018	→ Police Tero (loan)	32	(3)
2019	Army United	31	(3)
2020	Sukhothai	1	(0)
2020–2021	Trat	27	(2)
2021–2022	Uthai Thani	22	(7)
2022–2023	Kasetsart	30	(1)
2024	Rajpracha	2	(0)
Total		313	(46)

International career
2013–2018	Thailand	41	(10)

Managerial career
- 2023: Ayutthaya United
- 2023: VRN Muangnont
Medal record
Thailand
Asean Football Championship
Winner	AFF Suzuki Cup 2014	2014
Winner	AFF Suzuki Cup 2016	2016
- * Club domestic league appearances and goals

Mongkol Tossakrai (Thai: มงคล ทศไกร, born 9 May 1987), simply known as Yen (Thai: เย็น), is a Thai football coach and retired player.

He was considered to have one of the top 5 goals in Matchday 13 of the Thai League 1 by FOX Sports Asia.

== Club career ==
He played for Krung Thai Bank in the 2008 AFC Champions League group stages.

== International career ==
In 2013 Mongkol was called up to the national team by Surachai Jaturapattarapong to the 2015 AFC Asian Cup qualification. In October, 2013 he debuted for Thailand in a friendly match against Bahrain, as a substitute. On October 15, 2013 Mongkol came in as a substitute against Iran in the 2015 AFC Asian Cup qualification. He scored his first international goal against Kuwait in November 2013.

On November 9, 2014 Mongkol scored in a friendly match against Philippines. Mongkol was part of Thailand's winning squad at the 2014 AFF Suzuki Cup. He scored Thailand's first goal of the tournament in the 8th minute a 2-1 victory over hosts Singapore. Although that was the only goal he would score in the completion he was noted for his exiting play on the wings, especially in the second leg of the semi-finals against the Philippines where he constantly threatened the opponent's defense.

In May 2015, he was called up to Thailand to play in the 2018 FIFA World Cup qualification (AFC) against Vietnam.

=== International ===
Appearances and goals by national team and year
National team	Year	Apps	Goals
Thailand	2013	3	1
Thailand	2014	7	2
Thailand	2015	9	2
Thailand	2016	9	2
Thailand	2017	6	3
Thailand	2018	7	0
Thailand	Total	41	10

== International goals ==
As of match played 5 October 2017. Thailand score listed first, score column indicates score after each Tossakrai goal.

International goals by date, venue, cap, opponent, score, result and competition
No.	Date	Venue	Cap	Opponent	Score	Result	Competition
1	19 November 2013	Al Kuwait Sports Club Stadium, Kaifan, Kuwait	3	Kuwait	1–2	1–3	2015 AFC Asian Cup qualification
2	9 November 2014	80th Birthday Stadium, Nakhon Ratchasima, Thailand	4	Philippines	1–0	3–0	Friendly
3	23 November 2014	National Stadium, Kallang, Singapore	6	Singapore	1–0	2–1	2014 AFF Championship
4	3 September 2015	Rajamangala Stadium, Bangkok, Thailand	15	Afghanistan	1–0	2–0	Friendly
5	8 September 2015	Rajamangala Stadium, Bangkok, Thailand	16	Iraq	2–2	2–2	2018 FIFA World Cup qualification
6	24 March 2016	Shahid Dastgerdi Stadium, Tehran, Iran	20	Iraq	1–0	2–2	2018 FIFA World Cup qualification
7	3 June 2016	Rajamangala Stadium, Bangkok, Thailand	22	Syria	2–0	2–2 (7–6 p)	2016 King's Cup
8	13 June 2017	Rajamangala Stadium, Bangkok, Thailand	29	United Arab Emirates	1–0	1–1	2018 FIFA World Cup qualification
9	14 July 2017	Rajamangala Stadium, Bangkok, Thailand	30	North Korea	1–0	3–0	2017 King's Cup
10	5 October 2017	Mandalarthiri Stadium, Mandalay, Myanmar	33	Myanmar	1–0	3–1	Friendly

== Style of Play ==
He is known for his stamina, work rate, direct running, and movement off the ball. Despite his lack of technical proficiency on the ball, his style of play often results in his appearance on the scoresheet. Some of them are crucial goals for his club and country.

== Honours ==
=== International ===
Thailand

- ASEAN Football Championship (2): 2014, 2016

Thailand

- King's Cup (2): 2016, 2017

=== Club ===
Muangthong United

- Thailand Champions Cup (1): 2017

Chiangrai United

- Thailand Champions Cup (1): 2018

Uthai Thani

- Thai League 3 (1): 2021–22
- Thai League 3 Northern Region (1): 2021–22

=== Individual ===
- Thai League 1 Player of the Month (1): May 2014
