= 1975 King's Cup =

Tournament details
- Host country: Thailand
- Dates: 20 December – 4 January
- Teams: 6 (from 1 confederation)
- Venue: 1 (in 1 host city)

Final positions
- Champions: South Korea (6th title)
- Runners-up: Burma
- Third place: Thailand
- Fourth place: Malaysia

The 1975 King's Cup (Thai: คิงส์คัพ 1975) was the eighth invitational international association football championship organised by the Football Association of Thailand. Staged in Bangkok, the competition ran from 20 December 1975 to 4 January 1976 and was contested by the national teams of Burma, Malaysia, Singapore, South Korea and Thailand as well as a representative team from Indonesia.

Two-time defending champions South Korea and Burma contested the final. In a tightly contested match, South Korea narrowly edged out Burma 1–0 to win the competition.

== Background ==
The King's Cup was founded in 1968 and was inspired by the success of the Merdeka Tournament – an annual invitational international association football championship founded in 1957 and held to celebrate Independence Day in Malaysia. South Korea were two-time defending champions after defeating hosts Thailand 3–1 after extra time in the final of the previous edition in 1974. South Korea were also the most successful team in the history of the competition, having won the title five times previously.

The Persatuan Sepakbola Seluruh Indonesia (PSSI) sent a representative team made up of players mostly from Persib Bandung and Persija Jakarta. The team was known as Wilayah II.

== Format ==
The six teams contested a single round robin group. The group winners and runners-up would then contest the final.

=== Participants ===
- Burma
- Malaysia
- Singapore
- South Korea
- Thailand
- (Indonesia) Wilayah II

== Group stage ==
The competition began on 20 December 1975 when host Thailand recorded a 3–2 win against Wilayah II. The following day, Malaysia and Singapore played out a goalless draw and South Korea defeated Burma 3–1.

South Korea and Burma advanced to the final.

=== Table ===
Pos	Team	Pld	W	D	L	GF	GA	GD	Pts	Qualification
1	South Korea	5	4	0	1	15	3	+12	8	Advance to final
2	Burma	5	3	1	1	10	4	+6	7	Advance to final
3	Thailand	5	3	1	1	6	4	+2	7	
4	Malaysia	5	1	1	3	3	8	−5	3	
5	Singapore	5	1	1	3	1	12	−11	3	
6	(Indonesia) Wilayah II	5	1	0	4	4	8	−4	2	

=== Matches ===
20 December 1975

Thailand	3–2	(Indonesia) Wilayah II

21 December 1975

Singapore	0–0	Malaysia

21 December 1975

South Korea	3–1	Burma

23 December 1975

South Korea	1–2	Thailand

24 December 1975

Burma	6–0	Singapore

24 December 1975

Wilayah II (Indonesia)	1–2	Malaysia

26 December 1975

Thailand	0–1	Singapore

27 December 1975

Burma	2–1	Malaysia

27 December 1975

Wilayah II (Indonesia)	0–2	South Korea

29 December 1975

Malaysia	0–1	Thailand

30 December 1975

South Korea	5–0	Singapore

30 December 1975

Burma	1–0	(Indonesia) Wilayah II

1 January 1976

Burma	0–0	Thailand

2 January 1976

Wilayah II (Indonesia)	1–0	Singapore

2 January 1976

South Korea	4–0	Malaysia

== Final ==
South Korea defeated Burma to win the competition.

4 January 1976

South Korea	1–0	Burma
