= Mohannad Khairullah =

Jordanian footballer

Personal information
- Full name: Mohannad Khairullah Sulaiman Al-Qora'an Bani Hasan
- Date of birth: 25 July 1993 (age 33)
- Place of birth: Amman, Jordan
- Height: 1.85 m (6 ft 1 in)
- Position: Defender

Team information
- Current team: Al-Faisaly
- Number: 3

Senior career*
Years	Team	Apps	(Gls)
2013–2019	Al-Jazeera		
2019–2022	Al-Ramtha		
2022–2023	Al-Wehdat		
2023	Al-Ain	17	(0)
2023–	Al-Faisaly		

International career^{‡}
2014–2016	Jordan U23	8	
2016–	Jordan	17	(2)
- * Club domestic league appearances and goals ‡ National team caps and goals as of 3 October 2024

Mohannad Khairullah Sulaiman Al-Qora'an Bani Hasan (Arabic: مُهَنَّد خَيْر الله سُّلَيْمَان, born July 25, 1993) is a Jordanian footballer who is a defender for Jordanian Pro League side Al-Faisaly.

== International career ==
Mohannad's first international match with the Jordan national team was against United Arab Emirates in 2016 King's Cup on June 3, 2016, in Bangkok, when Jordan won 3–1.

== International goals ==
=== Senior team ===
#	Date	Venue	Opponent	Score	Result	Competition
1	June 3, 2016	Rajamangala Stadium, Bangkok, Thailand	United Arab Emirates	3–1	3–1	2016 King's Cup
2	October 10, 2017	Pamir Stadium, Dushanbe, Tajikistan	Afghanistan	3–3	3–3	2019 AFC Asian Cup qualification

== International career statistics ==
As of 9 December 2017

Jordan national team
Year	Apps	Goals
2016	3	1
2017	3	1
Total	6	2
