= Thitiphan Puangchan =

Thai footballer

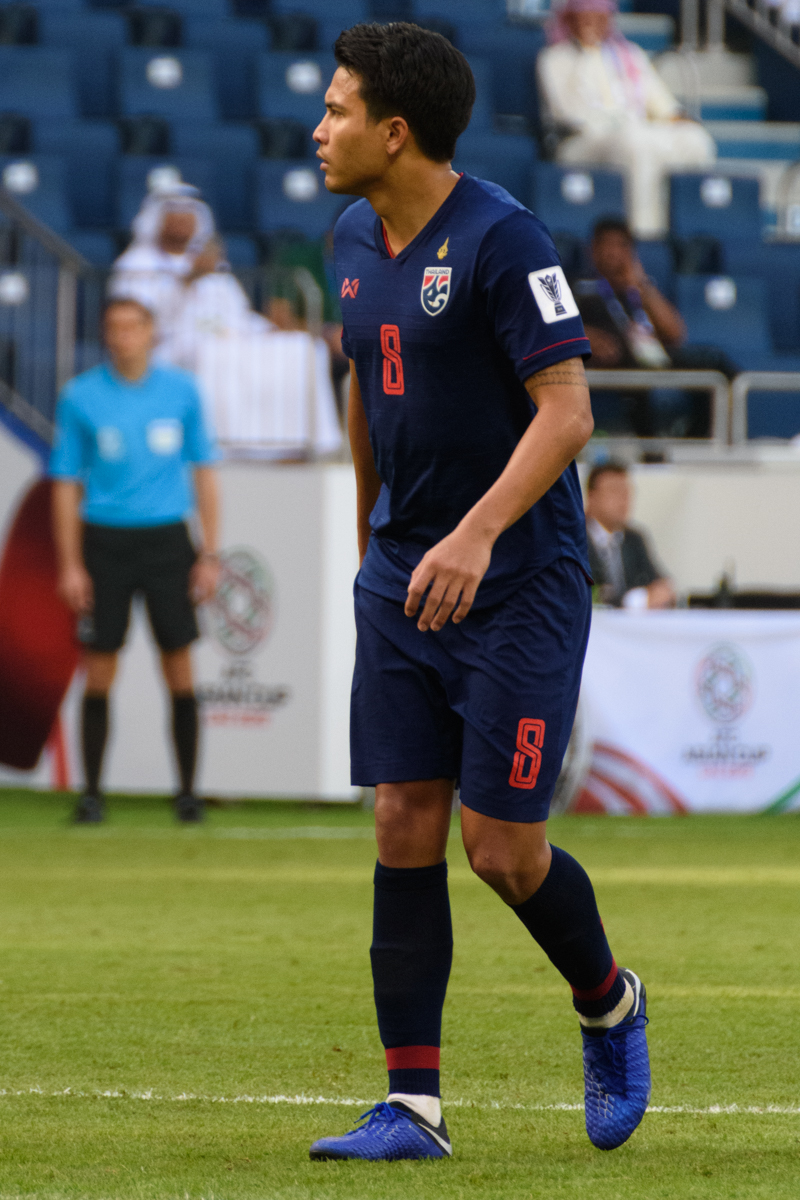
- Puangchan playing for Thailand at the 2019 AFC Asian Cup

Personal information
- Full name: Thitiphan Puangchan
- Date of birth: 1 September 1993 (age 33)
- Place of birth: Suphan Buri, Thailand
- Height: 1.78 m (5 ft 10 in)
- Position: Midfielder

Team information
- Current team: Bangkok United
- Number: 18

Youth career
- 2005–2010: Satriwitthaya 2 School
- 2010–2011: Muangthong United

Senior career*
Years	Team	Apps	(Gls)
2011–2016	Muangthong United	87	(10)
2011	→ Suphanburi (loan)	15	(3)
2016–2018	Chiangrai United	42	(6)
2018–2022	BG Pathum United	55	(8)
2019	→ Oita Trinita (loan)	20	(0)
2021–2022	→ Bangkok United (loan)	27	(3)
2022–	Bangkok United	75	(7)

International career^{‡}
2011–2012	Thailand U19	10	(4)
2012–2016	Thailand U23	18	(7)
2013–	Thailand	60	(7)
Medal record
Thailand under-19
AFF U-19 Youth Championship
Winner	AFF U-19 Youth Championship 2011	Football
Thailand under-23
Sea Games
Gold medal – first place	Sea Games 2013	Football
Gold medal – first place	Sea Games 2015	Football
Thailand
Asean Football Championship
Winner	AFF Suzuki Cup 2020	2020
- * Club domestic league appearances and goals as of 9 January 2026 ‡ National team caps and goals as of 9 June 2026

Thitiphan Puangchan (Thai: ฐิติพันธ์ พ่วงจันทร์, born 1 September 1993) is a Thai professional footballer who plays as a midfielder for Thai League 1 club Bangkok United and the Thailand national team. He is the son of Pairote Puangchan, who also played for the national team.

== Style of play ==
Early in his career with Muangthong United, Thitiphan played right-back. Thitiphan now often plays in central midfielder.

== International statistics ==
=== International goals ===
==== Thailand ====
Scores and results list Thailand's goal tally first.

#	Date	Venue	Opponent	Score	Result	Competition
1.	22 March 2013	Camille Chamoun Sports City Stadium, Beirut, Lebanon	Lebanon	1–3	2–5	2015 AFC Asian Cup qualification
2.	22 March 2013	Camille Chamoun Sports City Stadium, Beirut, Lebanon	Lebanon	2–4	2–5	2015 AFC Asian Cup qualification
3.	14 July 2017	Rajamangala Stadium, Bangkok, Thailand	North Korea	2–0	3–0	2017 King's Cup
4.	5 October 2017	Mandalarthiri Stadium, Mandalay, Myanmar	Myanmar	3–1	3–1	Friendly
5.	14 October 2018	Suphan Buri Provincial Stadium, Suphan Buri, Thailand	Trinidad and Tobago	1–0	1–0	Friendly
6.	14 January 2019	Hazza bin Zayed Stadium, Al Ain, United Arab Emirates	United Arab Emirates	1–1	1–1	2019 AFC Asian Cup
7.	11 June 2022	Markaziy Stadium, Namangan, Uzbekistan	Sri Lanka	1–0	2–0	2023 AFC Asian Cup qualification

== Honours ==
=== Club ===
Muangthong United

- Thai League 1: 2012

Chiangrai United

- Thai FA Cup: 2017

BG Pathum United

- Thai League 1: 2020–21

Bangkok United

- Thailand Champions Cup: 2023
- Thai FA Cup: 2023–24

=== International ===
Thailand U-19

- AFF U-19 Youth Championship: 2011

Thailand U-23

- Sea Games Gold Medal (2): 2013, 2015

Thailand

- King's Cup: 2017
- AFF Championship: 2020
