= 2022 King's Cup =

International football tournament held in Thailand

ฟุตบอลชิงถ้วยพระราชทานคิงส์คัพ 2022

Tournament details
- Host country: Thailand
- Dates: 22–25 September 2022
- Teams: 4 (from 2 confederations)
- Venue: 1 (in 1 host city)

Final positions
- Champions: Tajikistan (1st title)
- Runners-up: Malaysia
- Third place: Thailand
- Fourth place: Trinidad and Tobago

Tournament statistics
- Matches played: 4
- Goals scored: 8 (2 per match)

The 2022 Annual King's Cup Football Tournament (Thai: ฟุตบอลชิงถ้วยพระราชทานคิงส์คัพ 2022), commonly referred to as 2022 King's Cup, is the 48th King's Cup, the annual international men's football tournament organised by Football Association of Thailand. It is being held in Chiang Mai, Thailand, from 22 to 25 September 2022. Two matches were held on 22 September, the winners of which qualified for the final. The two other teams played the play-off for the 3rd spot.

As hosts, Thailand participated automatically in the tournament; they were joined by the CONCACAF team Trinidad and Tobago and AFC teams Tajikistan and Malaysia. In the final on 25 September, Tajikistan emerged victorious and clinched their first title, defeating Malaysia in penalty shootout.

Defending champions Curaçao did not participate.

== Participating teams ==
The following teams participated in the tournament:

Country	Association	Sub-confederation	Confederation	FIFA Ranking^{1}	Previous best performance
Thailand (hosts)	FAT	AFF	AFC	111	Champions (fifteen titles; last title: 2017)
Trinidad and Tobago	TTFA	CFU	CONCACAF	101	Debut
Tajikistan	FFT	CAFA	AFC	109	Debut
Malaysia	FAM	AFF	AFC	148	Champions (four titles; last title: 1978)

- ^{1} FIFA Ranking as of 21 September 2022.

== Venue ==
Chiang Mai
700th Anniversary Stadium
Capacity: 17,909
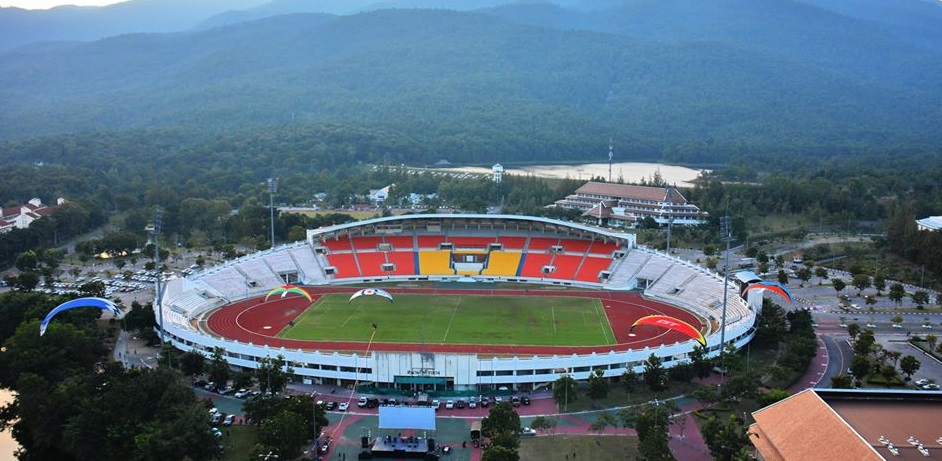

== Matches ==
All times are local, Indochina Time (UTC+7)

=== Match rules ===
- 90 minutes.
- Penalty shoot-out after a draw in 90 minutes.
- Maximum of five substitutions.

=== Bracket ===
Semi-finals
22 September – Chiang Mai
Trinidad and Tobago	1
Tajikistan	2
22 September – Chiang Mai
Thailand	1 (3)
Malaysia (p)	1 (5)

Final
25 September – Chiang Mai
Tajikistan (p)	0 (3)
Malaysia	0 (0)
Third place
25 September – Chiang Mai
Trinidad and Tobago	1
Thailand	2

=== Semi-finals ===
22 September 2022
17:30

Trinidad and Tobago	1–2	Tajikistan
J. García 27'	Report	Rakhimov 47'; Panjshanbe 75'

700th Anniversary Stadium, Chiang Mai
Attendance: 7,288
Referee: Torpong Somsing (Thailand)

22 September 2022
20:30

Thailand	1–1	Malaysia
Pansa 90+5'	Report	Corbin-Ong 32'
Penalties
Pathompol (penalty scored); Suphanat (penalty scored); Kritsada (penalty scored); Supachok (penalty missed)	3–5	(penalty scored) Cools; (penalty scored) Syafiq; (penalty scored) Davies; (penalty scored) Lambert; (penalty scored) Corbin-Ong

700th Anniversary Stadium, Chiang Mai
Attendance: 16,219
Referee: Muhammad Taqi (Singapore)

=== Third place play-off ===
25 September 2022
17:30

Trinidad and Tobago	1–2	Thailand
Kritsada 61' (o.g.)	Report	Channarong 21'; Supachok 72'

700th Anniversary Stadium, Chiang Mai
Attendance: 12,212
Referee: Muhammad Taqi (Singapore)

=== Final ===
25 September 2022
20:30

Tajikistan	0–0	Malaysia
	Report
Penalties
Nazarov (penalty missed); Khanonov (penalty scored); Tursunov (penalty scored); Soirov (penalty scored)	3–0	(penalty missed) Cools; (penalty missed) Nazmi; (penalty missed) Safawi

700th Anniversary Stadium, Chiang Mai
Attendance: 488
Referee: Wiwat Jumpao-on (Thailand)

== Winners ==
The 48th Annual King's Cup Football Tournament
champions

Tajikistan
1st title
