= 2019 King's Cup =

International football tournament

ฟุตบอลชิงถ้วยพระราชทานคิงส์คัพ 2019

Tournament details
- Host country: Thailand
- Dates: 5–8 June 2019
- Teams: 4 (from 2 confederations)
- Venue: 1 (in 1 host city)

Final positions
- Champions: Curaçao (1st title)
- Runners-up: Vietnam
- Third place: India
- Fourth place: Thailand

Tournament statistics
- Matches played: 4
- Goals scored: 8 (2 per match)
- Attendance: 55,642 (13,911 per match)

The 2019 Annual King's Cup Football Tournament (Thai: ฟุตบอลชิงถ้วยพระราชทานคิงส์คัพ 2019), commonly referred to as 2019 King's Cup, was the 47th King's Cup, the annual international men's football tournament organised by Football Association of Thailand. It was held in Buriram, Thailand, from 5 to 8 June 2019. Two matches were held on 5 June, the winners of which qualified for the final. The two other teams played the play-off for the 3rd spot.

As hosts, Thailand participated automatically in the tournament; they were joined by the CONCACAF team Curaçao and AFC teams Vietnam and India.

Defending champions Slovakia did not participate.

== Participating teams ==
The following teams have participated for the tournament.

Country	Association	Sub-confederation	Confederation	FIFA Ranking^{1}	Previous best performance
Thailand (host)	FAT	AFF	AFC	114	Champions (fifteen titles; last title: 2017)
Curaçao^{2}	FFK	CFU	CONCACAF	82	Debut
India	AIFF	SAFF	AFC	101	Third Place (1977)
Vietnam	VFF	AFF	AFC	98	Runner up (2006)

- ^{1} FIFA Ranking as of 4 April 2019.
- ^{2} Curaçao replaced El Salvador which withdrew from the tournament. El Salvador themselves replaced China which initially planned to enter the tournament.

== Venue ==
Buriram
Chang Arena
Capacity: 32,600
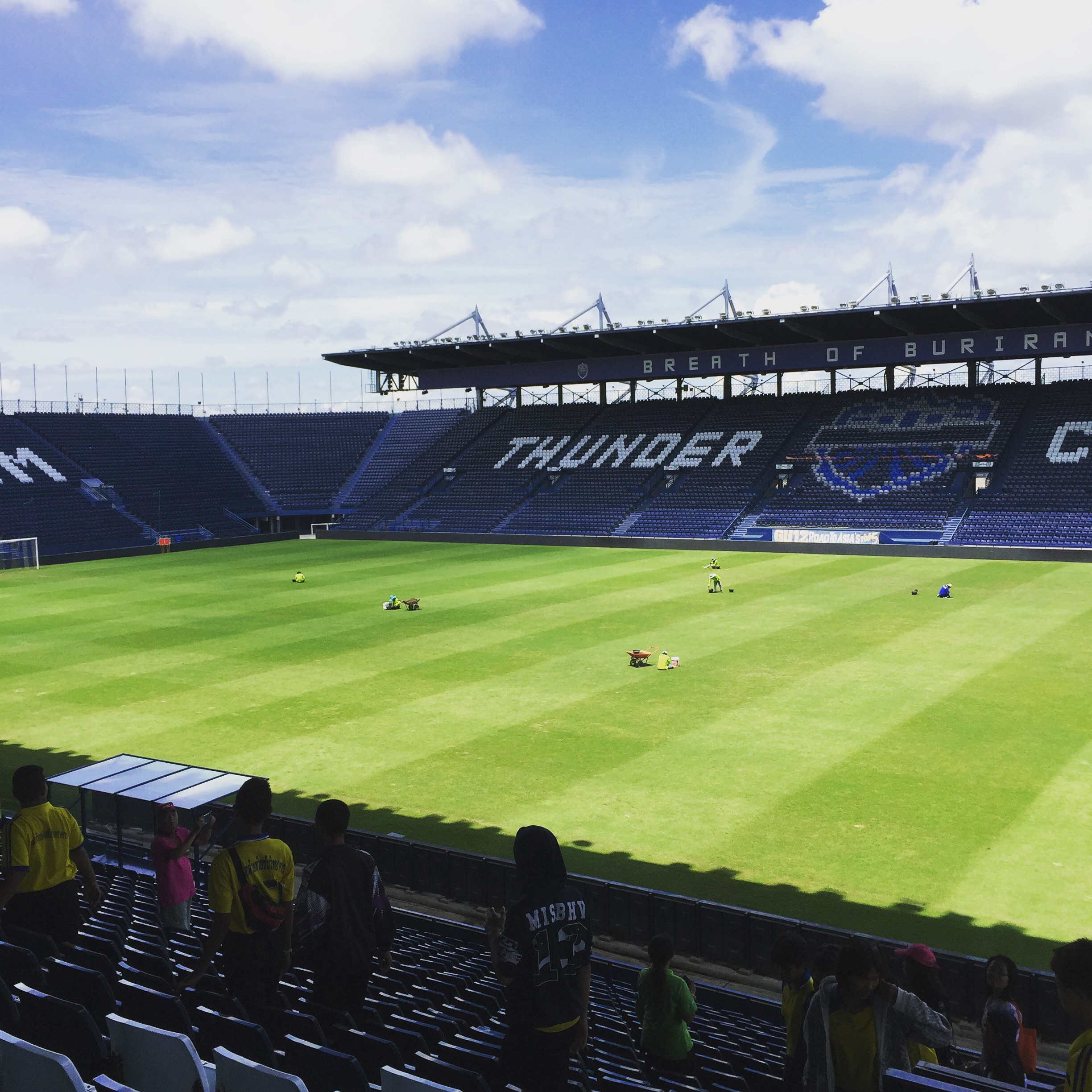

== Matches ==
All times are local, Indochina Time (UTC+7)

=== Match rules ===
- 90 minutes.
- Penalty shoot-out after a draw in 90 minutes.
- Maximum of three substitutions.

=== Bracket ===
Semi-finals
5 June – Buriram
Curaçao	3
India	1
5 June – Buriram
Thailand	0
Vietnam	1

Final
8 June – Buriram
Curaçao (p)	1 (5)
Vietnam	1 (4)
Third place
8 June – Buriram
India	1
Thailand	0

=== Semi-finals ===
5 June 2019
15:30

Curaçao	3–1	India
Bonevacia 15'; Hooi 17'; Bacuna 33'	Report	Chhetri 31' (pen.)

Chang Arena, Buriram
Attendance: 8,535
Referee: Chaireang Ngam-som (Thailand)

5 June 2019
19:45

Thailand	0–1	Vietnam
	Report	Nguyễn Anh Đức 90+4'

Chang Arena, Buriram
Attendance: 26,853
Referee: Jumpei Iida (Japan)

=== Third place play-off ===
8 June 2019
15:30

India	1–0	Thailand
Thapa 17'	Report

Chang Arena, Buriram
Attendance: 11,836
Referee: Jumpei Iida (Japan)

=== Final ===
8 June 2019
19:45

Curaçao	1–1	Vietnam
Carolina 58'	Report	Phạm Đức Huy 83'
Penalties
Benschop (penalty scored); Hooi (penalty scored); Antonia (penalty scored); Bacuna (penalty scored); Maria (penalty scored)	5–4	(penalty scored) Nguyễn Anh Đức; (penalty missed) Nguyễn Công Phượng; (penalty scored) Nguyễn Trọng Hoàng; (penalty scored) Quế Ngọc Hải; (penalty scored) Đoàn Văn Hậu

Chang Arena, Buriram
Attendance: 8,418
Referee: Wiwat Jumpao-on (Thailand)

== Winners ==
The 47th Annual King's Cup Football Tournament
Champions

Curaçao
1st title

== Final ranking ==
Pos	Team	Pld	W	D	L	GF	GA	GD	Pts	Final result
1	Curaçao	2	1	1	0	4	2	+2	4	Champions
2	Vietnam	2	1	1	0	2	1	+1	4	Runners-up
3	India	2	1	0	1	2	3	−1	3	Third place
4	Thailand (H)	2	0	0	2	0	2	−2	0	Fourth place

Source: FIFA
(H) Hosts

== Broadcasting rights ==
Country	Television broadcaster	Online streaming	Ref
India	Star Sports 3	Hotstar	
Thailand	Thairath TV	Not available	
Vietnam	VTC Digital Television	Not available	
South Korea	MBC Sports+	MBC	2 Vietnam matches only (semi-final and final)
