= 2002 King's Cup =

Tournament details
- Host country: Thailand
- Dates: 10–16 February
- Teams: 4 (from 1 confederation)
- Venue(s): 1 (in 1 host city)

Final positions
- Champions: (North Korea) Korea DPR
- Runners-up: Thailand
- Third place: Qatar
- Fourth place: Singapore

Tournament statistics
- Matches played: 8
- Goals scored: 19 (2.38 per match)
- Top scorer(s): (Singapore) Mohd Faduhasny (Thailand) Pitipong Kuldilok (2 goals)

The 33rd King's Cup finals was held from 10 to 16 February 2002 at the Supachalasai Stadium in Bangkok, Thailand. The King's Cup (คิงส์คัพ) is an annual football tournament; the first tournament was played in 1968.

== Participating nations ==
- Thailand
- North Korea
- Qatar
- Singapore

== Venue ==
Bangkok
Suphachalasai Stadium
Capacity: 19,793
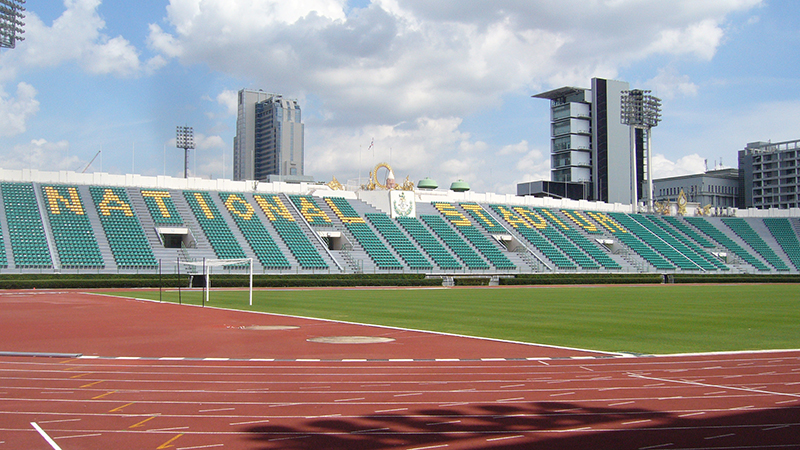

== Tournament ==
=== Round robin tournament ===
Team	Pld	W	D	L	GF	GA	GD	Pts
North Korea	3	2	1	0	6	3	+3	7
Thailand	3	2	0	1	5	1	+4	6
Qatar	3	1	1	1	4	2	+2	4
Singapore	3	0	0	3	2	11	−9	0

Source: RSSSF

== Matches ==
10 February 2002

Thailand	4–0	Singapore
Anurak 19'; Seksan 75'; Pitipong 76'; Kwanchai 90'

Supachalasai Stadium, Bangkok

10 February 2002

Qatar	1–1	North Korea
Assin Nasser 55'		Kim Yong-su 50'

Supachalasai Stadium, Bangkok

12 February 2002

Thailand	1–0	Qatar
Pitipong 19'

Supachalasai Stadium, Bangkok

12 February 2002

North Korea	4–2	Singapore
Choe Ung-chon 20'; Ri Kum-chol 66', 80'; Kim Yong-jun 85'		Faduhasnyl 1', 71'

Supachalasai Stadium, Bangkok

14 February 2002

Qatar	3–0	Singapore
H. Yasser 48', 77'; M. Yasser 81'

Supachalasai Stadium, Bangkok

14 February 2002

Thailand	0–1	North Korea
		Lee Oun-choy 60'

Supachalasai Stadium, Bangkok

=== Place Match ===
16 February 2002

Qatar	2–0	Singapore
Sayed Bechir 82'; Mustafa Mousa 90'

Supachalasai Stadium, Bangkok

=== Final ===
16 February 2002

Thailand	0–0	North Korea
Penalties
	3–4

Supachalasai Stadium, Bangkok

== Winner ==
2002 King's Cup champion

North Korea
3rd title

== Scorers ==
2 goals

- (Singapore) Mohd Faduhasny
- (Thailand) Pitipong Kuldilok

1 goals

- (North Korea) Choe Ung-chon
- (North Korea) Kim Yong-jun
- (North Korea) Kim Yong-soon
- (North Korea) Lee Oun-choy
- (North Korea) Ri Kum-chol
- (Qatar) Assin Nasser
- (Qatar) Hussein Yasser
- (Qatar) Mohammed Yasser
- (Qatar) Mustafa Jalal Mousa
- (Qatar) Sayed Ali Bechir
- (Thailand) Anurak Srikerd
- (Thailand) Kwanchai Seungprakob
- (Thailand) Sakda Joemdee
