= Buriram Stadium =

Football stadium in Buriram, Thailand

Chang Arena
- "The Thunder Castle"
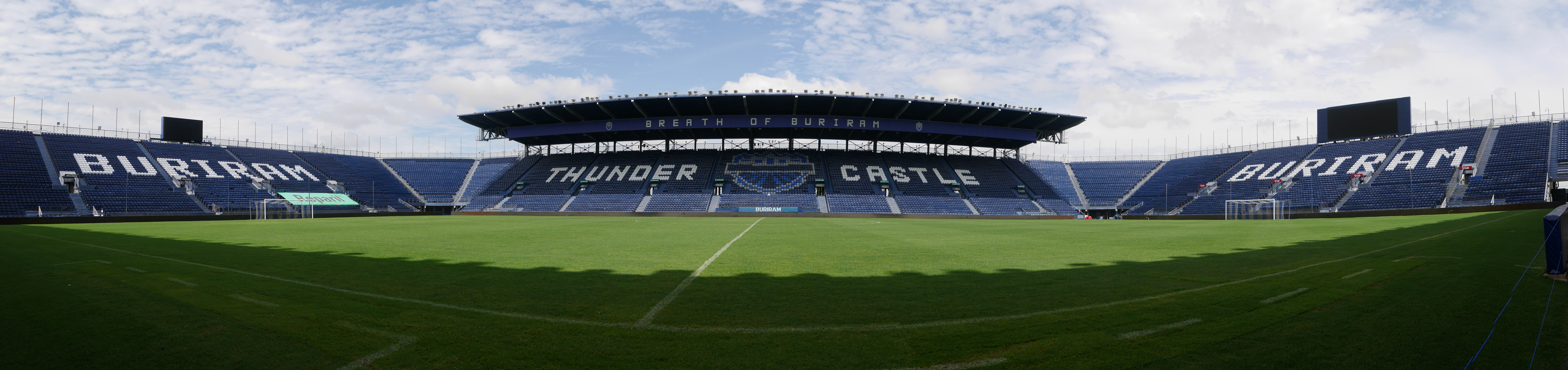
- The interior of the stadium
- Interactive map of Chang Arena
- Full name: Chang Arena
- Location: Mueang Buriram, Buriram, Thailand
- Coordinates: 14°57′57″N 103°05′40″E
- Owner: Buriram United
- Operator: Buriram United
- Capacity: 32,600
- Surface: Grass
- Record attendance: 35,573 (Buriram United vs Pattaya United, 29 October 2018)

Construction
- Groundbreaking: 4 October 2010
- Opened: 4 June 2011
- Expanded: Q4/2013
- Cost: US$12–17 million

Tenant
- Buriram United (2011-present)

The Buriram Stadium (known for sponsorship purposes as Chang Arena) is a 32,600-seat football stadium in Buriram, Thailand. The stadium is the home of Buriram United. Chang Arena is the largest club-owned football stadium in Thailand. Its nickname is "The Thunder Castle", the fifth castle of Buriram Province.

== History ==
The stadium is in the Isan sub-districts, Mueang Buriram district, Buriram province. The 150-acre site has a capacity of 32,600 people with parking for 500 cars and 1,000 motorcycles. The pitch is floodlit, allowing for night matches. It is funded under the title-assignment contract from I-Mobile and parts of club president Newin Chidchob.

The stadium was recorded in Guinness World Records that is the only FIFA-level football stadium in the world with the lowest construction time in the world with 256 days.

== Name ==
The stadium was originally named "New I-Mobile Stadium" due to a sponsorship agreement with I-Mobile. It is also known as "Thunder Castle Stadium".

In 2017 the stadium was renamed to "Chang Arena" due to the sponsorship of Chang beer. The stadium is referred to by its official name, Buriram Stadium, by the Asian Football Confederation (AFC).

== Facilities ==
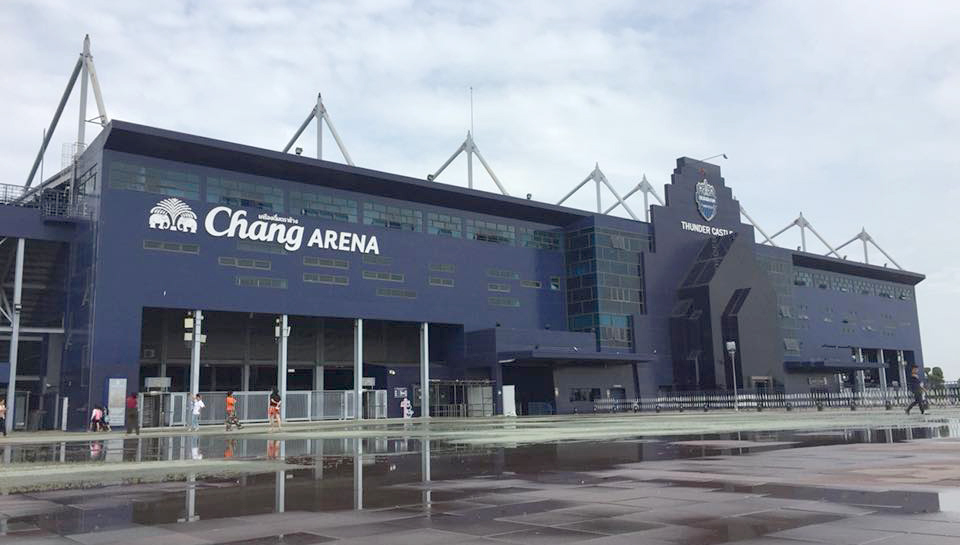
In front of the stadium

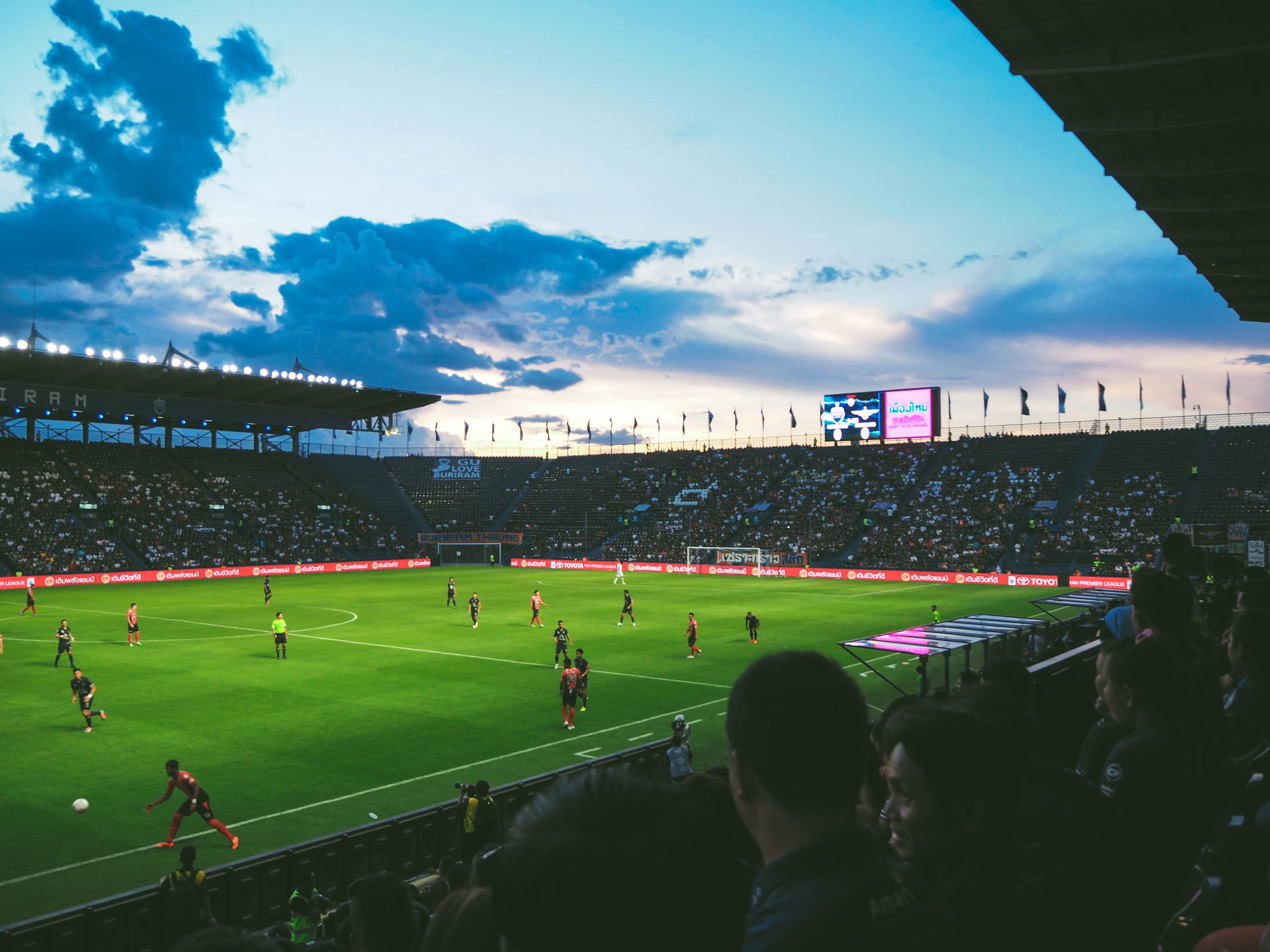
The stadium on a matchday

The stadium is the first sole-use football stadium in Thailand that meets FIFA and AFC standards. The stadium is eligible to host all levels of domestic or international football matches. The stadium houses locker rooms for home and visiting teams, modern medical facilities, and television and radio broadcasting facilities.

== International football matches ==
Date	Team #1	Score	Team #2	Match
14 July 2011	Thailand	1–0	Myanmar	Friendly
15 July 2011	Thailand	1–1	Myanmar	Friendly
23 July 2011	Thailand	1–0	Palestine	2014 FIFA World Cup qualification (AFC)
10 November 2017	North Korea	4–1	Malaysia	2019 AFC Asian Cup qualification – third round
13 November 2017	Malaysia	1–4	North Korea	2019 AFC Asian Cup qualification – third round
5 June 2019	Curaçao	3–1	India	2019 King's Cup
5 June 2019	Vietnam	1–0	Thailand	2019 King's Cup
8 June 2019	Thailand	0–1	India	2019 King's Cup
8 June 2019	Vietnam	1–1 (4–5 p)	Curaçao	2019 King's Cup
7 October 2021	Indonesia	2–1	Chinese Taipei	2023 AFC Asian Cup qualification – play-off round
11 October 2021	Chinese Taipei	0–3	Indonesia	2023 AFC Asian Cup qualification – play-off round

=== 2020 AFC U-23 Championship ===
Date	Time (UTC+07)	Team #1	Res.	Team #2	Round	Attendance
10 January 2020	17:15	Vietnam	0–0	United Arab Emirates	Group Stage	3,967
10 January 2020	20:15	North Korea	1–2	Jordan	Group Stage	305
13 January 2020	17:15	United Arab Emirates	2–0	North Korea	Group Stage	1,867
13 January 2020	20:15	Jordan	0–0	Vietnam	Group Stage	1,089
16 January 2020	20:15	Jordan	1–1	United Arab Emirates	Group Stage	205

== See also ==
- List of football stadiums in Thailand
- Lists of stadiums
