= 2004 King's Cup =

Tournament details
- Host country: Thailand
- Dates: 30 November – 1 December
- Teams: 4 (from 2 confederations)
- Venue: 1 (in 1 host city)

Final positions
- Champions: Slovakia (1st title)
- Runners-up: Thailand
- Third place: Hungary
- Fourth place: Estonia

Tournament statistics
- Matches played: 4
- Goals scored: 8 (2 per match)

The 2004 King's Cup finals were held from November 30 to December 1, 2004, in Bangkok The King's Cup (คิงส์คัพ) is an annual football tournament; the first tournament was played in 1968.

The tournament was reverted to a knockout competition, starting from the semi-finals.

Slovakia won the tournament defeating Thailand on penalties. Hungary and Estonia were the other teams to play in this tournament.

== Bracket ==
Semi-finals
30 November – Bangkok
Slovakia | 1
Hungary | 0
30 November – Bangkok
Thailand | 0 (4)
Estonia | 0 (3)

Final
1 December – Bangkok
Slovakia | 1 (5)
Thailand | 1 (4)
Third place
1 December – Bangkok
Hungary | 5
Estonia | 0

== Matches ==
=== Semi finals ===
30 November 2004
16:15 UTC+7

| Slovakia | 1–0 | Hungary |
|---|---|---|
| Porázik 48' |

Bangkok

30 November 2004
19:00 UTC+7

| Thailand | 0–0 | Estonia |
Penalties
| | 4–3 |

Bangkok

=== 3/4 Place Match ===
1 December 2004
16:15 UTC+7

| Hungary | 5–0 | Estonia |
|---|---|---|
| Rósa 12'; Reinumäe 14' (o.g.); Kerekes 19'; Rajczi 25'; Pollák 62' |

Bangkok

=== Final ===
1 December 2004
19:00 UTC+7

| Slovakia | 1–1 | Thailand |
|---|---|---|
| Ďurica 67' (pen.) | | Sakda 13' (pen.) |
Penalties
| | 5–4 |

Bangkok

== Winner ==
2004 King's Cup champion

Slovakia
1st title
