= 1974 King's Cup =

Tournament details
- Host country: Thailand
- Dates: 10–20 December
- Teams: 8 (from 1 confederation)
- Venue: 1 (in 1 host city)

Final positions
- Champions: South Korea (5th title)
- Runners-up: Thailand
- Third place: Malaysia
- Fourth place: Khmer Republic

The 1974 King's Cup (Thai: คิงส์คัพ 1974) was the seventh invitational international association football championship organised by the Football Association of Thailand. Staged in Bangkok, the competition ran from 10 to 20 November 1974 and was contested by the national teams of Khmer Republic, Laos, Malaysia, Singapore, South Korea, South Vietnam and Thailand as well as Indonesian club PSM Makassar.

After two rounds of play, defending champions South Korea and hosts Thailand contested the final. South Korea defeated Thailand 3–1 after extra time to win the competition. In the third-place play-off, Malaysia defeated the Khmer Republic 3–0.

== Background ==
The King's Cup was founded in 1968 and was inspired by the success of the Merdeka Tournament – an annual invitational international association football championship founded in 1957 and held to celebrate Independence Day in Malaysia. South Korea were the defending champions after defeating Malaysia 2–1 in the final of the previous edition in 1973. South Korea were also the most successful team in the history of the competition, having won the title four times previously.

== Format ==
In total, eight teams took part in the competition. They were drawn into two single round robin groups of four teams. The group winners and runners-up would then contest the semi-finals which would determine the teams contesting the final and the third-place play-off.

=== Participants ===
- Khmer Republic
- Laos
- Malaysia
- (Indonesia) PSM Makassar
- Singapore
- South Korea
- South Vietnam
- Thailand

== Group stage ==
=== Group A ===
South Korea advanced to the semi-finals. A play-off was organised between the Khmer Republic and South Vietnam to decide second place after both teams finished on equal points and goal average.

==== Table ====
Pos	Team	Pld	W	D	L	GF	GA	GAv	Pts	Qualification
1	South Korea	3	2	1	0	8	3	2.667	5	Advance to semi-finals
2	Khmer Republic	3	1	1	1	5	5	1.000	3	Advance to play-off
2	South Vietnam	3	1	1	1	6	6	1.000	3	Advance to play-off
4	(Indonesia) PSM Makassar	3	0	1	2	2	7	0.286	1	

==== Matches ====
11 December 1974

Khmer Republic	3–2	South Vietnam

11 December 1974

South Korea	4–0	(Indonesia) PSM Makassar

13 December 1974

South Korea	2–1	Khmer Republic

13 December 1974

South Vietnam	2–1	(Indonesia) PSM Makassar

15 December 1974

South Korea	2–2	South Vietnam

15 December 1974

Khmer Republic	1–1	(Indonesia) PSM Makassar

==== Play-off ====
The Khmer Republic defeated South Vietnam to advance to the semi-finals.

16 December 1974

Khmer Republic	2–0	South Vietnam

=== Group B ===
Thailand and Malaysia advanced to the semi-finals. As both team finished on equal points and goal average, a play-off was organised to determine the group winner.

==== Table ====
Pos	Team	Pld	W	D	L	GF	GA	GAv	Pts	Qualification
1	Thailand	3	2	0	1	8	4	2.000	4	Advance to semi-finals
1	Malaysia	3	1	2	0	4	2	2.000	4	Advance to semi-finals
3	Singapore	3	1	1	1	3	2	1.500	3	
4	Laos	3	0	1	2	3	10	0.300	1	

==== Matches ====
10 December 1974

Laos	0–2	Singapore

10 December 1974

Thailand	0–2	Malaysia

12 December 1974

Singapore	0–0	Malaysia

12 December 1974

Thailand	6–1	Laos

14 December 1974

Thailand	2–1	Singapore

14 December 1974

Malaysia	2–2	Laos

==== Play-off ====
Thailand defeated Malaysia to win the group.

16 December 1974

Thailand	4–1	Malaysia

== Semi-finals ==
South Korea defeated Malaysia on penalties and Thailand defeated the Khmer Republic to advance to the final.

18 December 1974

South Korea	0–0	Malaysia
Penalties
	5–4

18 December 1974

Khmer Republic	0–1	Thailand

== Third-place play-off ==
Khmer Republic defeated Malaysia to finish third.

20 December 1974

Khmer Republic	0–3	Malaysia

== Final ==
South Korea defeated Thailand after extra time to win the competition.

20 December 1974

Thailand	1–3 (a.e.t.)	South Korea
