= 1973 King's Cup =

Tournament details
- Host country: Thailand
- Dates: 16–25 December
- Teams: 6 (from 1 confederation)
- Venue: 1 (in 1 host city)

Final positions
- Champions: South Korea (4th title)
- Runners-up: Malaysia
- Third place: Thailand
- Fourth place: Burma

The 1973 King's Cup (Thai: คิงส์คัพ 1973) was the sixth invitational international association football championship organised by the Football Association of Thailand. Staged in Bangkok, the competition was played in December 1973 and was contested by the national teams of Burma, Khmer Republic, Malaysia, South Korea, South Vietnam and Thailand.

Although some results are not fully known, South Korea and Malaysia contested the final after two rounds of play. In a tightly contested match, South Korea narrowly edged out Malaysia 2–1 to win the competition. In the third-place play-off, Thailand defeated Burma 1–0.

== Background ==
The King's Cup was founded in 1968 and was inspired by the success of the Merdeka Tournament – an annual invitational international association football championship founded in 1957 and held to celebrate Independence Day in Malaysia. Malaysia were the defending champions after defeating hosts Thailand 1–0 in the final of the previous edition in 1972. South Korea were the most successful team in the history of the competition, having won the title three times previously.

== Format ==
In total, six teams took part in the competition. They were drawn into two single round robin groups of three teams. The group winners and runners-up would then contest the semi-finals which would determine the teams contesting the final and the third-place play-off.

=== Participants ===
- Burma
- Khmer Republic
- Malaysia
- South Korea
- South Vietnam
- Thailand

== Group stage ==
=== Group A ===
The exact results in Group A are not fully known. Thailand and Burma advanced to the semi-finals.

==== Table ====
Pos	Team	Pld	W	D	L	GF	GA	GAv	Pts	Qualification
1	Thailand	2	1	0	1	0	0	—	2	Advance to semi-finals
2	Burma	2	1	0	1	0	0	—	2	Advance to semi-finals
3	South Vietnam	2	1	0	1	0	0	—	2	

==== Matches ====
December 1973

Thailand	defeated	South Vietnam

December 1973

Burma	defeated	Thailand

December 1973

South Vietnam	1–0	Burma

=== Group B ===
South Korea and Malaysia advanced to the semi-finals.

==== Table ====
Pos	Team	Pld	W	D	L	GF	GA	GAv	Pts	Qualification
1	South Korea	2	1	1	0	5	0	—	3	Advance to semi-finals
2	Malaysia	2	1	1	0	3	2	1.500	3	Advance to semi-finals
3	Khmer Republic	2	0	0	2	2	8	0.250	0	

==== Matches ====
16 December 1973

South Korea	5–0	Cambodia
Jeong Gyu Poong (x2); Park Lee-chun; Kim Jae-han; Cha Bum-kun

18 December 1973

South Korea	0–0	Malaysia

20 December 1973

Malaysia	3–2	Cambodia

== Semi-finals ==
South Korea defeated Burma and Malaysia defeated Thailand to advance to the final.

22 December 1973

South Korea	2–0	Burma
Park Lee-chun; Cha Bum-kun

22 December 1973

Malaysia	1–0	Thailand

== Third-place play-off ==
Thailand defeated Burma to finish third.

25 December 1973

Thailand	1–0	Burma

== Final ==
South Korea defeated Malaysia to win the competition.

25 December 1973

Malaysia	1–2	South Korea
Dahari 35'		Yoo Kim-soo 2'; Cha Bum-kun 19'
