= Fousseyni Béao =

Burkinabé footballer

Personal information
- Date of birth: 6 July 1994 (age 32)
- Place of birth: Bobo-Dioulasso, Burkina Faso
- Height: 1.77 m (5 ft 10 in)
- Position: Defender

Team information
- Current team: Étoile Filante

Senior career*
Years	Team	Apps	(Gls)
2013–2017	RC Bobo Dioulasso		
2017–	Étoile Filante		

International career^{‡}
2015–	Burkina Faso	9	(0)
- * Club domestic league appearances and goals as of 10:59, 24 September 2018 (UTC) ‡ National team caps and goals as of 10:59, 24 September 2018 (UTC)

Fousseyni Béao (born 6 July 1994) is a Burkinabé international footballer who plays for Étoile Filante, as a defender.

== Career ==
Born in Bobo-Dioulasso, he has played club football for RC Bobo Dioulasso and Étoile Filante.

He made his international debut for Burkina Faso in 2015.
