= 2009 King's Cup =

Tournament details
- Host country: Thailand
- Dates: 21–23 January
- Teams: 4 (from 2 confederations)
- Venue: 1 (in 1 host city)

Final positions
- Champions: Denmark League XI (2nd title)
- Runners-up: Thailand
- Third place: Lebanon
- Fourth place: North Korea

Tournament statistics
- Matches played: 4
- Goals scored: 9 (2.25 per match)
- Top scorer(s): (Thailand) Sutee Suksomkit (2 goals)

The 39th King's Cup finals was held from 21 to 23 January 2009 at the Surakul Stadium in Phuket, Thailand. The King's Cup (คิงส์คัพ) is an annual football tournament; the first tournament was played in 1968.

This edition of the tournament was due to be played at the end of the domestic football season, the Thailand Premier League in October, but was postponed until early 2009 after the Thai national team made other commitments.

The tournament was held in between the 2008 AFF Suzuki Cup and the start of qualification for the AFC Asian Cup.

The format of this tournament had also changed from the previous edition, to a knockout basis, starting from the semi-finals, instead of a round robin group stage.

== Participating nations ==
- Thailand
- (North Korea) Korea DPR
- Lebanon
- Denmark League XI

== Venue ==
Phuket
Surakul Stadium
Capacity: 16,000
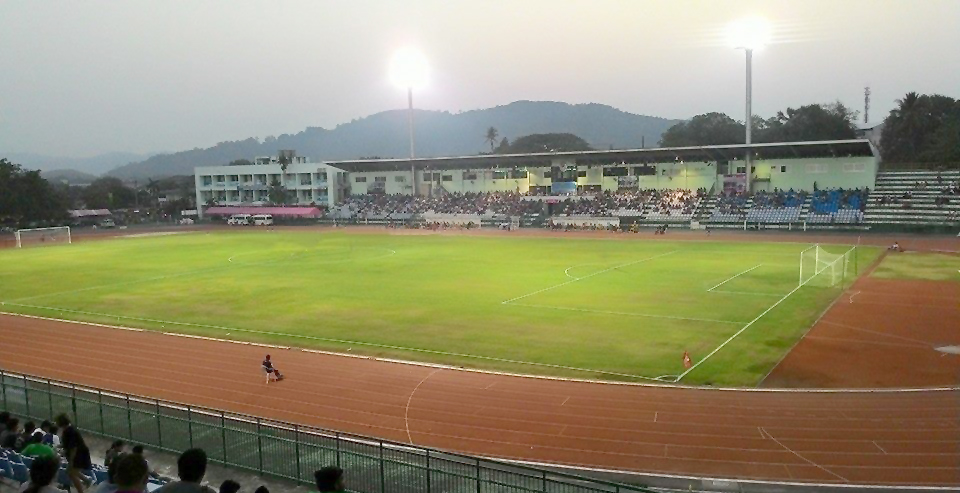

== Bracket ==
Semi-finals
21 January – Phuket
Denmark League XI	1
(North Korea) Korea DPR	0
21 January – Phuket
Thailand	2
Lebanon	1

Final
23 January – Phuket
Denmark League XI (pen.)	2 (5)
Thailand	2 (3)
Third place
23 January – Phuket
(North Korea) Korea DPR	0
Lebanon	1

== Matches ==
=== Semi finals ===
21 January 2009
16:15 UTC+7

Denmark League XI	1–0	(North Korea) Korea DPR
Rieks 22'

Surakul Stadium, Phuket
Attendance: 3,500
Referee: Sura Sriart (Thailand)

21 January 2009
19:00 UTC+7

Thailand	2–1	Lebanon
Dangda 11'; Nutnum 22'		El Ali 51'

Surakul Stadium, Phuket
Attendance: 15,000
Referee: Prayoon Veerapool (Thailand)

=== 3/4 Place Match ===
23 January 2009
16:15 UTC+7

Korea DPR (North Korea)	0–1	Lebanon
		Atwi 72'

Surakul Stadium, Phuket

=== Final ===
23 January 2009
19:00 UTC+7

Denmark League XI	2–2	Thailand
Olsen 35'; Ilsø 90'		Suksomkit 66' (pen.), 81'
Penalties
Stokholm (penalty scored); Duncan (penalty scored); Bernburg (penalty scored); Ilsø (penalty scored); Poulsen (penalty scored)	5–3	(penalty scored) Suksomkit; (penalty missed) Thonglao; (penalty scored) Sangsanoi; (penalty scored) Viwatchaichok

Surakul Stadium, Phuket
Attendance: 15,000
Referee: Sura Sriart (Thailand)

== Winner ==
2009 King's Cup champion

Denmark League XI
2nd title

== Scorers ==
2 goals

- (Thailand) Sutee Suksomkit

1 goal

- (Denmark) Søren Rieks
- (Denmark) Danny Olsen
- (Denmark) Ken Ilsø
- (Lebanon) Mahmoud El Ali
- (Lebanon) Abbas Ahmed Atwi
- (Thailand) Teerasil Dangda
- (Thailand) Suchao Nutnum

== See also ==
- King's Cup
- Football in Thailand
