= Surakul Stadium =

Multi-purpose stadium in Phuket, Thailand

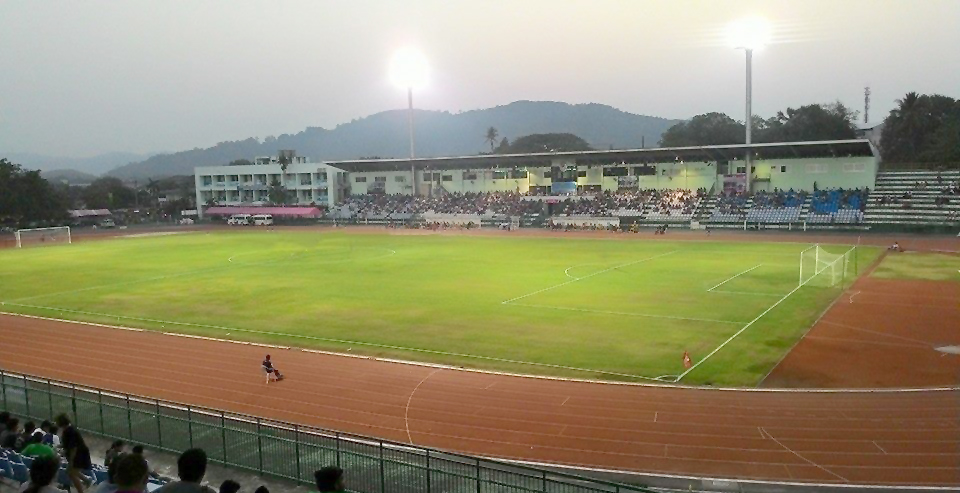
- Interactive map of Surakul Stadium
- Location: Phuket, Thailand
- Coordinates: 7°53′20″N 98°22′19″E
- Owner: Sports Authority of Thailand (SAT)
- Operator: Phuket Provincial Administrative
- Capacity: 16,000
- Surface: Grass

Construction
- Opened: 1964

Surakul Stadium (Thai: สนามกีฬาสุระกุล; RTGS: Sanamkila Surakun) is a multi-purpose stadium in Phuket Province, Thailand. It is currently used mostly for football matches. The stadium holds 15,000 and was built in 1959.

The stadium co-hosted the 2008 AFF Suzuki Cup. The use of the Surakul Stadium for this tournament had to be hastily arranged. Stadiums in Bangkok were intended to be used but because of the airport takeovers in Bangkok by the PAD the AFF in consultation with the FAT decided to switch venues. Despite better stadiums being available in Nakhon Ratchasima (5th December Stadium); Chiang Mai (700th Anniversary Stadium) and Songkhla (Tinsulanon Stadium); the Surakul Stadium was chosen as all the teams could fly directly into Phuket.

The stadium also played host to the 2009 King's Cup which included a notorious game involving Thailand and Lebanon where the latter walked off the pitch during the game as they became incensed by what they saw as biased refereeing.

The stadium will be used by Phuket F.C. for the 2009 season in the newly formed Division 2 Southern Region of the Thailand Division 2 League.

The finals of the well-known Rugby tens, Phuket International Rugby 10's in June 2009 are also played there.

== Stadium and locations ==
Coordinates	Location	Stadium	Capacity	Year
7°53′20″N 98°22′19″E	Phuket	Surakul Stadium	15,000	2009–present

== International football matches ==
Date	Team #1	Score	Team #2	Match
6 December 2008	Malaysia	3 – 0	Laos	2008 AFF Championship
6 December 2008	Thailand	2 – 0	Vietnam	2008 AFF Championship
8 December 2008	Malaysia	2 – 3	Vietnam	2008 AFF Championship
8 December 2008	Laos	0 – 6	Thailand	2008 AFF Championship
10 December 2008	Thailand	3 – 0	Malaysia	2008 AFF Championship
10 December 2008	Vietnam	4 – 0	Laos	2008 AFF Championship
