= 2016 King's Cup =

2016 King's Cup คิงส์คัพ 2016

Tournament details
- Host country: Thailand
- Dates: 3–5 June 2016
- Teams: 4 (from 1 confederation)
- Venue: 1 (in 1 host city)

Final positions
- Champions: Thailand (14th title)
- Runners-up: Jordan
- Third place: Syria
- Fourth place: United Arab Emirates

Tournament statistics
- Matches played: 4
- Goals scored: 11 (2.75 per match)
- Attendance: 95,000 (23,750 per match)
- Top scorer: (Thailand) Kroekrit Thaweekarn (2 goal)
- Fair play award: United Arab Emirates

The 2016 King's Cup (also known as the 44th Annual King's Cup Football Tournament) (Thai:การแข่งขันฟุตบอลชิงถ้วยพระราชทานคิงส์คัพครั้งที่ 44) is an international football competition, and will be the 44th edition of the tournament. It was organised by the Football Association of Thailand or the FAT. The tournament is set to be a in knockout tournament format with all matches being held at the Rajamangala Stadium in Bangkok, Thailand on 3 and 5 June.

This edition will feature the host Thailand and three invited teams. The three teams that have been invited are Jordan, United Arab Emirates, and Syria. Montenegro was expected to participate, but later declined, leaving the Thais to put Syria instead.

== Participant teams ==
The 2016 King's Cup is included the following four teams

Team	Association	Confederation	Finals appearance	Previous best performance	FIFA Ranking
Team	Association	Confederation	Finals appearance	Previous best performance	June 2016
Thailand (Host)	FA Thailand	AFC	44th	Champions (1976, 1979, 1980, 1981, 1982, 1984, 1989, 1990, 1992, 1994, 2000, 2006, 2007)	117 (4)
Jordan	Jordan FA	AFC	1st	Debut	80 (2)
Syria	Syria FA	AFC	1st	Debut	101 (3)
United Arab Emirates	UAE FA	AFC	1st	Debut	70 (1)

== Venue ==
Bangkok
Rajamangala Stadium
Capacity: 49,772
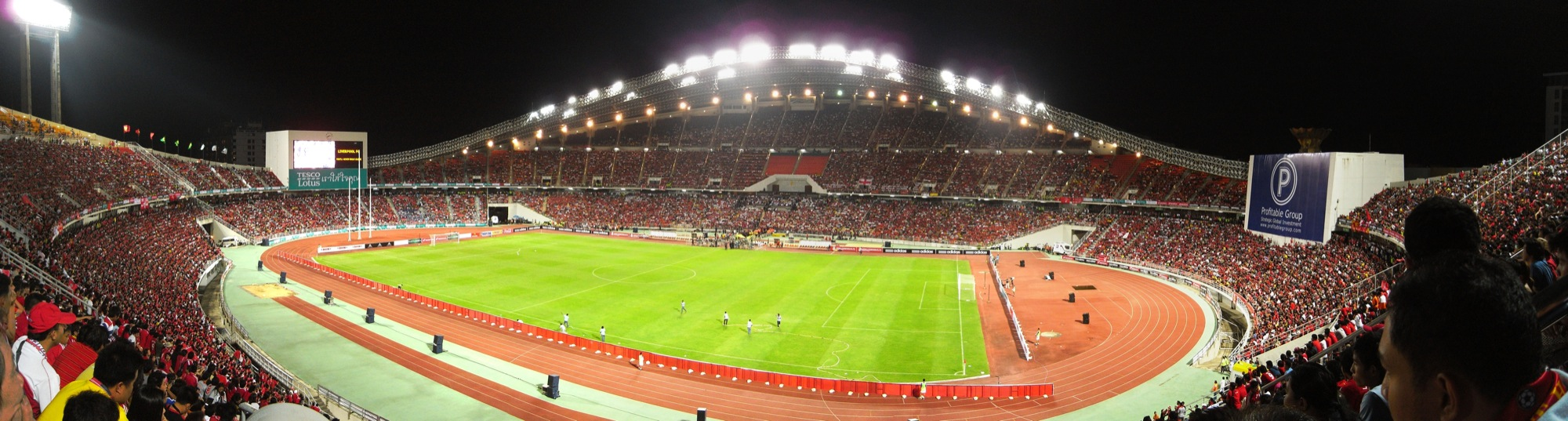

== Draw ==
The seeded teams which headed up each group was announced on May 10, 2016: United Arab Emirates and Jordan (Top Half), Thailand and Syria (Bottom Half).

This ceremony was drawn by Watchara Watcharapol, CEO of Thairath TV and Supasin Leelarit, Vice chairman of 2016 King's Cup Organizing Committee.

Top Half	Bottom Half
United Arab Emirates Jordan	Thailand (Host) Syria

== Match officials ==
The following referees were chosen for the 2016 King's Cup.

Referees

- (Singapore) Sukhbir Singh
- (Uzbekistan) Aziz Asimov
- (Malaysia) Mohd Nafeez Abdul Wahab
- (Qatar) Khamis Al-Marri

Assistant referees

- (Myanmar) Thein Hanh
- (Singapore) Ronnie Koh Min Kiat
- (Malaysia) Mohd Shahreen Che Omar
- (Uzbekistan) Alisher Usmanov

== Knockout stage ==
All times are Thailand Standard Time (UTC+07:00).

In all matches in the knockout stage, if the score were level at the end of 90 minutes, If the score were still level after 90 minutes, the match was decided by a penalty shoot-out.

Semi-finals
3 June – Bangkok
United Arab Emirates	1
Jordan	3
3 June – Bangkok
Thailand (pen.)	2 (7)
Syria	2 (6)

Final
5 June – Bangkok
Jordan	0
Thailand	2
Third place
5 June – Bangkok
United Arab Emirates	0
Syria	1

=== Semi-finals ===
3 June 2016
17:00

United Arab Emirates	1–3	Jordan
Al-Shamsi 45+2'	Report	Abdel-Rahman 8'; Al-Dardour 50'; Khairullah 68'

Rajamangala Stadium, Bangkok, Thailand
Referee: Aziz Asimov (Uzbekistan)

3 June 2016
20:00

Thailand	2–2	Syria
Teerasil 20'; Mongkol 43'	Report	Al-Mawas 60'; Al-Agha 86'
Penalties
Theerathon (penalty scored); Sarach (penalty scored); Sanrawat (penalty missed); Tanaboon (penalty scored); Adisak (penalty scored); Tana (penalty scored); Tristan (penalty scored); Mika (penalty scored)	7–6	(penalty scored) Al Salih; (penalty scored) Al Nakdali; (penalty scored) Omari; (penalty missed) Al-Mawas; (penalty scored) Al-Agha; (penalty scored) Ajan; (penalty scored) Mido; (penalty missed) Al Baour

Rajamangala Stadium, Bangkok, Thailand
Referee: Sukhbir Singh (Singapore)

=== Third place play-off ===
5 June 2016
17:00

United Arab Emirates	0–1	Syria
	Report	Al-Mawas 50'

Rajamangala Stadium, Bangkok, Thailand
Referee: Khamis Al-Marri (Qatar)

=== Final ===
5 June 2016
20:00

Thailand	2–0	Jordan
Kroekrit 52', 80'	Report

Rajamangala Stadium, Bangkok, Thailand
Referee: Nafeez Abdul Wahab (Malaysia)

== Goalscorers ==
2 goals

- (Thailand) Kroekrit Thaweekarn

1 goal

- (Jordan) Baha' Abdel-Rahman
- (Jordan) Hamza Al-Dardour
- (Jordan) Mohannad Khairullah
- (Syria) Abdul Fattah Al Agha
- (Syria) Mahmoud Maowas
- (Syria) Hamid Mido
- (Thailand) Teerasil Dangda
- (Thailand) Mongkol Tossakrai
- (United Arab Emirates) Sultan Al-Shamsi

== Winners ==
The 44th Annual King's Cup Football Tournament
champions

Thailand
14th title

== Broadcasting rights ==
Territory	Channel	Ref
Jordan	Sky Sport	
Thailand	Thairath TV	
United Arab Emirates	Dubai Sports	
Syria	Sky Sport	
