= 2017 King's Cup =

ฟุตบอลชิงถ้วยพระราชทานคิงส์คัพ 2017

Tournament details
- Host country: Thailand
- Dates: 14–16 July
- Teams: 4 (from 3 confederations)
- Venue: 1 (in 1 host city)

Final positions
- Champions: Thailand (15th title)
- Runners-up: Belarus
- Third place: Burkina Faso
- Fourth place: North Korea

Tournament statistics
- Matches played: 4
- Goals scored: 9 (2.25 per match)
- Top scorer: (Burkina Faso) Lassina Traoré (2 goals)
- Fair play award: North Korea

The 2017 Annual King's Cup Football Tournament, commonly referred to as 2017 King's Cup, was the 45th King's Cup, the annual international men's football tournament organised by Football Association of Thailand. It was held in Bangkok, Thailand, from 14 to 16 July 2017.

The matches were played at Rajamangala Stadium in Bangkok. As hosts, Thailand participated automatically in the tournament; they were joined by the African team Burkina Faso, the Asian team North Korea and the European team Belarus.

The defending champions, Thailand, who won the previous fourteen King's Cup, defended their title. Burkina Faso and Belarus made their debuts. Burkina Faso were represented by their African Nations Championship team, composed of domestic league players. Belarus were represented by their B-team, composed of domestic league players. North Korea were represented by several their B-team and a few A-team players.

== Participant teams ==
The following teams have participated for the tournament.

Country	Association	Confederation	FIFA Ranking^{1}	Previous best performance
Thailand (host)	FA Thailand	AFC	131	Champions (fourteen titles; last title: 2016)
Burkina Faso^{3}	Burkinabé FF	CAF	44	Debut^{2}
Belarus^{4}	FF Belarus	UEFA	71	Debut^{2}
North Korea	DPR Korea FA	AFC	113	Champions (1986, 1987, 2002)

- ^{1} FIFA Ranking as of 6 July 2017.
- ^{2} Burkina Faso and Belarus making their debut.
- ^{3} Burkina Faso will be represented by their domestic national team.
- ^{4} Belarus will be represented by their B-team

=== Teams profile ===
Country	Team profile
Thailand (host)	2018 FIFA World Cup qualification – third round qualifier
Burkina Faso	2017 Africa Cup of Nations third place
North Korea	2018 FIFA World Cup qualification – Second round top thirteen
Belarus	UEFA Euro 2016 qualifying Group C fourth place

== Venue ==
Bangkok
Rajamangala Stadium
Capacity: 49,772
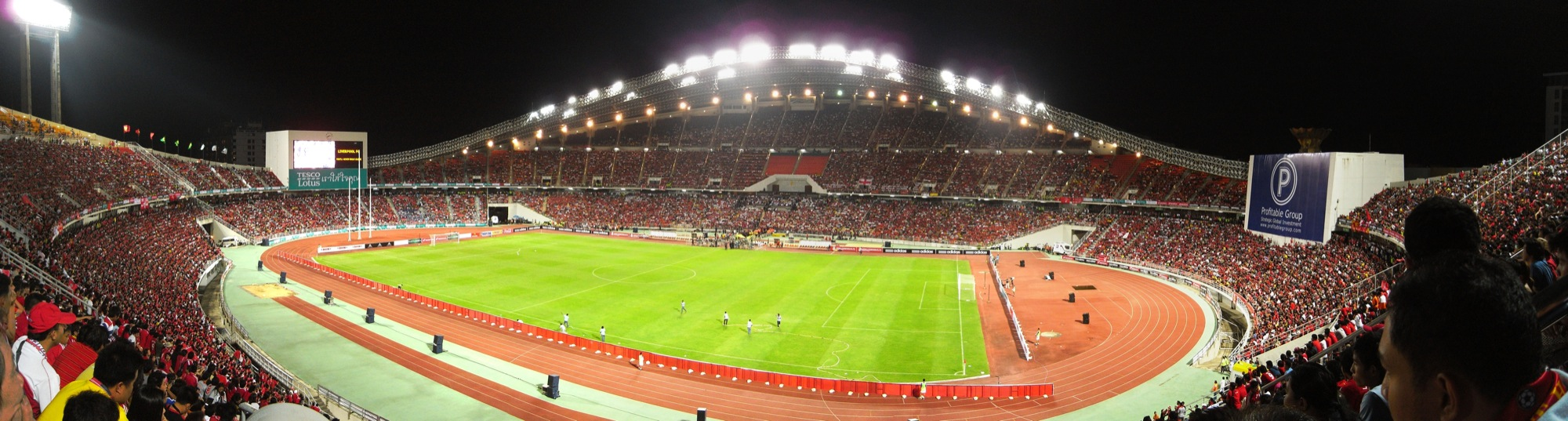

== Draw ==
The draw will be held on 3 July 2017, at the Thairath Headquarter in Bangkok, Thailand. Suppasin Leelarit, vice president of Football Association of Thailand and Watchara Watcharapol, chief executive officer of Thairath TV will participate in the draw.

The 4 teams are drawn into two matches, with hosts Thailand being allocated to bottom half (semi-finals 2).

Pot 1
- Thailand (Hosts – assigned to SF2)
- Belarus
- Burkina Faso
- North Korea

== Matches ==
All times are local, Indochina Time (UTC+7)

=== Match rules ===
- 90 minutes.
- Penalty shoot-out after a draw in 90 minutes.
- Maximum of three substitutions.

=== Bracket ===
Semi-finals
14 July – Bangkok
Burkina Faso	0 (0)
Belarus (pen.)	0 (3)
14 July – Bangkok
Thailand	3
North Korea	0

Final
16 July – Bangkok
Belarus	0 (4)
Thailand (pen.)	0 (5)
Third place play-off
16 July – Bangkok
Burkina Faso (pen.)	3 (4)
North Korea	3 (3)

=== Semi-finals ===
14 July 2017
16:30

Burkina Faso	0–0	Belarus
	Report
Penalties
Tapsoba (penalty missed); Barro (penalty missed); Ouédraogo (penalty missed)	0–3	(penalty scored) Savitski; (penalty scored) Pavlovets; (penalty scored) Sazonovich

Rajamangala Stadium, Bangkok
Referee: Zaw Khaing (Myanmar)

14 July 2017
19:30

Thailand	3–0	North Korea
Mongkol 40'; Thitipan 77'; Teeratep 90+1' (pen.)	Report

Rajamangala Stadium, Bangkok
Referee: Yusuke Araki (Japan)

=== Third place play-off ===
16 July 2017
16:30

Burkina Faso	3–3	North Korea
Zagré 44'; L. Traoré 68', 73'	Report	Pak Song-chol 4'; Myong Cha-hyon 66' (pen.); Rim Kwang-hyok 82'
Penalties
L. Traoré (penalty scored); Ouattara (penalty scored); Béao (penalty scored); Tapsoba (penalty missed); Sawadogo (penalty scored)	4–3	(penalty missed) Rim Kwang-hyok; (penalty missed) Jo Kwang; (penalty scored) Kim Ju-song; (penalty scored) Song Kum-il; (penalty scored) Pak Song-chol

Rajamangala Stadium, Bangkok
Referee: Zaw Khaing (Myanmar)

=== Final ===
16 July 2017
19:30

Belarus	0–0	Thailand
	Report
Penalties
Savitski (penalty scored); Klopotskiy (penalty missed); Salavey (penalty scored); Shevchenko (penalty scored); Volkov (penalty scored); Skitaw (penalty missed)	4–5	(penalty scored) Teeratep; (penalty missed) Peerapat; (penalty scored) Roller; (penalty scored) Thitipan; (penalty scored) Theerathon; (penalty scored) Siroch

Rajamangala Stadium, Bangkok
Referee: Yusuke Araki (Japan)

== Winners ==
The 45th Annual King's Cup Football Tournament
champions

Thailand
15th title

== Goalscorers ==
2 goals

- (Burkina Faso) Lassina Traoré

1 goal

- (Burkina Faso) Ismaël Zagré
- (North Korea) Myong Cha-hyon
- (North Korea) Pak Song-chol
- (North Korea) Rim Kwang-hyok
- (Thailand) Mongkol Tossakrai
- (Thailand) Teeratep Winothai
- (Thailand) Thitipan Puangchan

== Final ranking ==
Pos	Team	Pld	W	D	L	GF	GA	GD	Pts	Final result
1	Thailand (H)	2	1	1	0	3	0	+3	4	Champions
2	Belarus	2	0	2	0	0	0	0	2	Runners-up
3	Burkina Faso	2	0	2	0	3	3	0	2	Third place
4	North Korea	2	0	1	1	3	6	−3	1	Fourth place

Source: FIFA
(H) Hosts

== FIFA ranking ==
The Union of European Football Associations (UEFA) sent a letter of confirmation to the Football Association of Thailand. UEFA has no objection to participation of Belarus (domestic-league players) in this tournament.

The Football Federation of Belarus will register for the tier-2 international match, which will record the result without FIFA scoring. The remaining three teams will register for the tier-1 international match.

Tier-1 International Matches
Matches	Team 1		Score	Team 2	
SF2	Thailand	+222	3–0	North Korea	0
TPO	Burkina Faso	+74	3–3	North Korea	+133
Tier-2 International Matches
Matches	Team 1		Score	Team 2	
SF1	Burkina Faso		0–0	Belarus	
Final	Belarus		0–0	Thailand	
