= 1972 King's Cup =

Tournament details
- Host country: Thailand
- Dates: 18–28 November
- Teams: 5 (from 1 confederation)
- Venue: 1 (in 1 host city)

Final positions
- Champions: Malaysia (1st title)
- Runners-up: Thailand
- Third place: South Korea
- Fourth place: Singapore

Tournament statistics
- Matches played: 12
- Goals scored: 27 (2.25 per match)

The 1972 King's Cup (Thai: คิงส์คัพ 1972) was the fifth invitational international association football championship organised by the Football Association of Thailand. Staged in Bangkok, the competition ran from 18 to 28 November 1972 and was contested by the national teams of Malaysia, Singapore, South Korea, and Thailand as well as the B team of Indonesia.

Three-time defending champions South Korea lost their crown after finishing third in the group stage. Hosts Thailand and Malaysia contested the final. In a tightly contested match, Malaysia narrowly edged out Thailand 1–0 to win the competition. In the third-place play-off, South Korea and Singapore played out a goalless draw so third place was shared.

== Background ==
The King's Cup was founded in 1968 and was inspired by the success of the Merdeka Tournament – an annual invitational international association football championship founded in 1957 and held to celebrate Independence Day in Malaysia. South Korea were three-time defending champions after defeating hosts Thailand 1–0 in the final of the previous edition in 1971. South Korea were also the most successful team in the history of the competition, having won the title three times previously.

== Format ==
The five teams contested a single round robin group. The group winners and runners-up would then contest the final and the teams finishing third and fourth would contest the third-place play-off.

=== Participants ===
- Indonesia
- Malaysia
- Singapore
- South Korea
- Thailand

== Group stage ==
Thailand and Malaysia advanced to the final while South Korea and Singapore advanced to the third-place play-off.

=== Table ===
Pos	Team	Pld	W	D	L	GF	GA	GAv	Pts	Qualification
1	Thailand	4	3	0	1	8	2	4.000	6	Advance to final
2	Malaysia	4	3	0	1	7	4	1.750	6	Advance to final
3	South Korea	4	2	1	1	7	3	2.333	5	Advance to third-place play-off
4	Singapore	4	1	0	3	2	9	0.222	2	Advance to third-place play-off
5	Indonesia	4	0	1	3	2	8	0.250	1	

=== Matches ===
18 November 1972

South Korea	4–1	Malaysia

18 November 1972

Singapore	0–4	Thailand

20 November 1972

Indonesia	1–2	Singapore

20 November 1972

Malaysia	2–0	Thailand

22 November 1972

Malaysia	2–0	Singapore

22 November 1972

Indonesia	1–1	South Korea

24 November 1972

South Korea	2–0	Singapore

24 November 1972

Indonesia	0–3	Thailand

26 November 1972

Indonesia	0–2	Malaysia

26 November 1972

South Korea	0–1	Thailand

== Third-place play-off ==
After a goalless draw, South Korea and Singapore shared third place.

28 November 1972

South Korea	0–0	Singapore

== Final ==
Malaysia defeated Thailand to win the competition.

28 November 1972

Thailand	0–1	Malaysia
