= 1976 King's Cup =

Tournament details
- Host country: Thailand
- Dates: 15–25 December
- Teams: 6 (from 1 confederation)
- Venue: 1 (in 1 host city)

Final positions
- Champions: Thailand (1st title); Malaysia (2nd title)
- Third place: South Korea

The 1976 King's Cup were held from 15 December to 25 December 1976, in Bangkok. This edition once again reverted to two groups of 3 teams. The winners and runners up advance.

Thailand entered this tournament with an 'A' and 'B' squads.

== The Groups ==
- Two groups of three teams.
- Winners and runner up qualifies for the semi-finals.

Group A	Group B
Thailand (host country); Singapore; South Korea	Malaysia; Thailand B Selection; Bangladesh

== Fixtures and results ==
=== Group A ===
Team	Pld	W	D	L	GF	GA	GD	Pts
Thailand A	2	2	0	0	8	1	+7	4
South Korea	2	1	0	1	5	2	+3	2
Singapore	2	0	0	2	0	10	−10	0

Source: RSSSF
December 15, 1976

Thailand A	2–1	South Korea

Bangkok

December 17, 1976

South Korea	4–0	Singapore

Bangkok

December 19, 1976

Singapore	0–6	Thailand A

Bangkok

=== Group B ===
Team	Pld	W	D	L	GF	GA	GD	Pts
Malaysia	2	2	0	0	7	0	+7	4
Thailand B	2	1	0	1	2	1	+1	2
Bangladesh	2	0	0	2	0	8	−8	0

Source: RSSSF
December 16, 1976

Thailand B	0–1	Malaysia

Bangkok

December 18, 1976

Malaysia	6–0	Bangladesh

Bangkok

December 20, 1976

Bangladesh	0–2	Thailand B

Bangkok

=== Semi-finals ===
December 22, 1976

Malaysia	1–1	South Korea
Penalties
	3–2

Bangkok

December 23, 1976

Thailand A	2–1	Thailand B

Bangkok

=== 3rd-place match ===
December 25, 1976

Thailand B	1–3	South Korea

Bangkok

=== Final ===
December 25, 1976

Thailand A	1–1	Malaysia
Jedsadaphon Na Phatthalung (?)		(?)

Bangkok

Title shared

== Winner ==
1976 King's Cup champion

Thailand
1st title

1976 King's Cup champion

Malaysia
2nd title
