= 1977 King's Cup =

Tournament details
- Host country: Thailand
- Dates: October 28 – November 12
- Teams: 6 (from 1 confederation)
- Venue(s): 1 (in 1 host city)

Final positions
- Champions: South Korea B (1st title); Malaysia (3rd title)
- Third place: India
- Fourth place: Thailand

The 1977 King's Cup were held from October 28 to November 12, 1977, once again in Bangkok. This was the 10th edition of the international football competition.

The tournaments schedule was changed from previous edition and back to a one group round robin phase previously seen in 1972 and 1975. The winners and runners up entered a final.

== Fixtures and results ==
=== Group stage ===
| Team | Pld | W | D | L | GF | GA | GD | Pts |
|---|---|---|---|---|---|---|---|---|
| Malaysia | 5 | 4 | 0 | 1 | 12 | 5 | +7 | 8 |
| South Korea B | 5 | 4 | 0 | 1 | 8 | 1 | +7 | 8 |
| India | 5 | 3 | 1 | 1 | 6 | 6 | 0 | 7 |
| Thailand | 5 | 1 | 2 | 2 | 4 | 4 | 0 | 4 |
| Indonesia | 5 | 1 | 1 | 3 | 4 | 9 | −5 | 3 |
| Singapore | 5 | 0 | 0 | 5 | 5 | 14 | −9 | 0 |

Source: RSSSF
October 28, 1977

| Thailand | 2–0 | Singapore |

Bangkok

October 29, 1977

| Indonesia | 0–3 | Malaysia |

Bangkok

October 29, 1977

| South Korea B | 0–1 | India |

Bangkok

October 31, 1977

| India | 1–1 | Thailand |

Bangkok

November 1, 1977

| Malaysia | 4–3 | Singapore |

Bangkok

November 1, 1977

| Indonesia | 0–3 | South Korea B |

Bangkok

November 3, 1977

| Thailand | 0–0 | Indonesia |

Bangkok

November 4, 1977

| India | 2–1 | Singapore |

Bangkok

November 4, 1977

| South Korea B | 1–0 | Malaysia |

Bangkok

November 6, 1977

| Malaysia | 2–1 | Thailand |

Bangkok

November 7, 1977

| South Korea B | 3–0 | Singapore |

Bangkok

November 7, 1977

| India | 2–1 | Indonesia |

Bangkok

November 9, 1977

| South Korea B | 1–0 | Thailand |

Bangkok

November 10, 1977

| Malaysia | 3–0 | India |

Bangkok

November 10, 1977

| Indonesia | 3–1 | Singapore |

Bangkok

Indonesia were represented by Persipura.

=== Final ===
November 12, 1977

| South Korea B | 0–0 | Malaysia |

Bangkok

Title shared

== Winner ==
1977 King's Cup champion

South Korea B
7th title

1977 King's Cup champion

Malaysia
3rd title
