= 1978 King's Cup =

Tournament details
- Host country: Thailand
- Teams: 6 (from 1 confederation)
- Venue(s): 1 (in 1 host city)

Final positions
- Champions: Malaysia (4th title)
- Runners-up: Singapore

The 1978 King's Cup were held in Bangkok. This edition once again reverted to two groups of 3 teams. The winners and runners up advance.

Thailand entered this edition with an 'A' and 'B' squads. Indonesia was represented by clubside Persib.

== The Groups ==
- Two groups of three teams.
- Winners and runner up qualifies for the semi-finals.

Group A	Group B
Thailand (host country); Indonesia; South Korea	Malaysia; Thailand B Selection; Singapore

== Fixtures and results ==
=== Group A ===
Team	Pld	W	D	L	GF	GA	GD	Pts
South Korea	2	1	1	0	2	0	+2	3
Thailand A	2	1	0	1	3	2	+1	2
Indonesia	2	0	1	1	0	3	−3	1

Source: RSSSF
April 25, 1978

Thailand A	3–0	Indonesia

Bangkok

April 27, 1978

South Korea	0–0	Indonesia

Bangkok

April 29, 1978

South Korea	2–0	Thailand A

Bangkok

=== Group B ===
Results unknown

=== Semi-finals ===
Malaysia	3–0	South Korea

Bangkok

Thailand A	?–?	Singapore

Bangkok

Singapore advanced, result unknown

=== Final ===
Singapore	2–3	Malaysia

Bangkok

== Winner ==
1978 King's Cup champion

Malaysia
4th title
