= Tinsulanon Stadium =

Sports venue in Songkhla, Thailand

Tinsulanonda Stadium สนามติณสูลานนท์
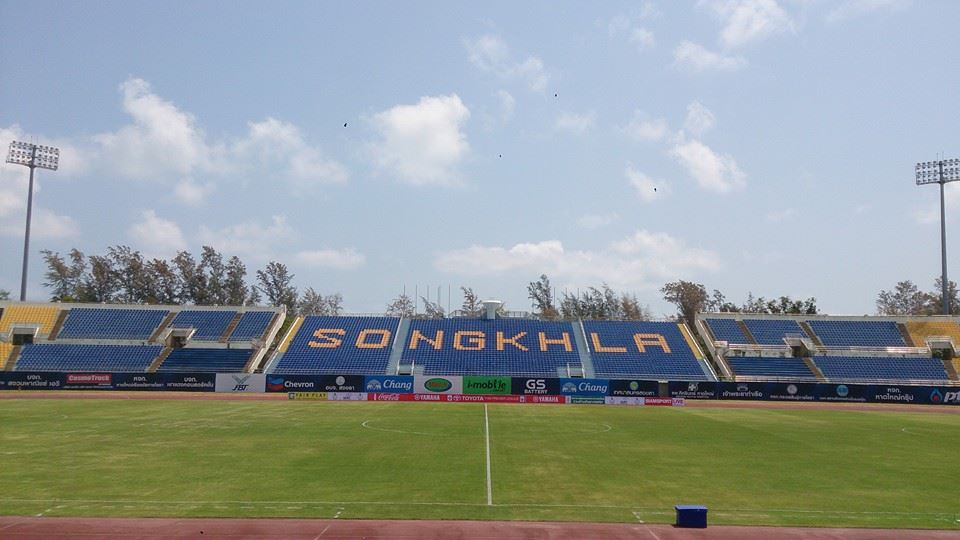
- Interactive map of Tinsulanonda Stadium สนามติณสูลานนท์
- Full name: Tinsulanonda Stadium
- Location: Bo Yang, Mueang Songkhla, Songkhla, Songkhla, Thailand
- Coordinates: 7°12′26″N 100°35′55″E
- Owner: Sports Authority of Thailand
- Operator: Sports Authority of Thailand
- Capacity: 30,000
- Surface: Grass
- Field size: 95 x 62 m

Construction
- Built: 1995
- Renovated: 2019
- Cost: THB200 million

Tenants
- Songkhla (2018–): Major sporting events hosted; 1998 Asian Games men's football tournament; 2020 AFC U-23 Championship; 2024 King's Cup

Tinsulanonda Stadium (Thai: สนามติณสูลานนท์, RTGS: Sanam Tinnasulanon) is a multi-purpose stadium in Songkhla, Thailand. Named after the Songkhla-born former Thai Prime Minister Prem Tinsulanonda, it is used mostly for football matches.

The stadium has a capacity of 30,000 but just 2,000 of those spaces are covered in a small single-tiered stand along one touchline. The rest of the stadium is a continuous curving tier. The stadium hosted one of the semi-finals in the 1998 Asian Games men's football tournament.

== History ==
In the early 1970s, the Sports Authority of Thailand has a project to build a stadium in the region in Songkhla. The stadium name is "District 9 Stadium", located in Bo Yang Subdistrict, Mueang District, Songkhla Province, with the support of the construction budget from the Government Lottery Office.

In 1989, Songkhla has been selected to host the National Games causing District 9 stadium to undergo major renovation including changing the stadium name from "District 9 Stadium" to "Tinsulanon Stadium" since that change Tinsulanon Stadium has become an important stadium in the southern region of Thailand to organize sporting events in various categories.

In 1998 Tinsulanon Stadium get the opportunity to host the largest event, such as the 13th Asian Games, 1998, hosted by Thailand at Tinsulanon Stadium. Therefore, a major improvement is needed again because the stadium has been selected to be the competition field for football.

Later in 2014, the Sports Authority of Thailand transferred the field supervision to the Provincial Administrative Organization of Songkhla and use a budget of 200 million baht to renovate football fields and other fields by increasing the stadium capacity from 35,000 seats to 45,000 seats and changing into all seats and renovate the grandstand side of the stadium to be a 2-level grandstand with 10,000 seats in order to support the Thailand National Games at Songkhla in 2017.

In 2019, Tinsulanon Stadium has undergone major renovations to accommodate the hosting 2020 AFC U-23 Championship.

In 2024, the stadium hosted the 2024 King's Cup tournament.

== International football matches ==
=== 2020 AFC U-23 Championship ===
Date	Time (UTC+07)	Team #1	Res.	Team #2	Round	Attendance
9 January 2020	17:15	Uzbekistan	1–1	Iran	Group stage	4,180
9 January 2020	20:15	South Korea	1–0	China	Group stage	6,000
12 January 2020	17:15	Iran	1–2	South Korea	Group stage	6,000
12 January 2020	20:15	China	0–2	Uzbekistan	Group stage	6,683
15 January 2020	17:15	China	0–1	Iran	Group stage	3,567

=== 2024 King's Cup ===
Date	Time (UTC+07)	Team #1	Res.	Team #2	Round	Attendance
11 October 2024	16:30	Syria	1–0	Tajikistan	Semi-finals	13,588
11 October 2024	20:00	Thailand	3–1	Philippines	Semi-finals	19,506
14 October 2024	16:30	Tajikistan	0–3	Philippines	Third place	9,664
14 October 2024	20:00	Syria	1–2	Thailand	Final	24,121
