= Football at the 2002 Asian Games – Men's team squads =

Below are the squads for the men's football tournament at the 2002 Asian Games, played in Busan, South Korea.

Since 2002 male competitors have been required to be under 23 years old, and a maximum of three over-23-year-old players have been allowed per squad. Overage players are marked with *.

== Group A ==
=== Malaysia ===
Coach: (England) Allan Harris

No.	Pos.	Player	Date of birth (age)	Club
1	GK	Azmin Azram Abdul Aziz	1 April 1976 (aged 26)	(Football Association of Malaysia) Selangor
2	DF	Subri Sulong	15 May 1979 (aged 23)	(Football Association of Malaysia) Terengganu
3	DF	Norhafiz Zamani Misbah	15 July 1981 (aged 21)	(Football Association of Malaysia) Negeri Sembilan
4	DF	Rushanizam Idrus		(Football Association of Malaysia) Perak
5	DF	Redzuan Mohd Radzy	5 April 1981 (aged 21)	(Football Association of Malaysia) Kedah
6	MF	Syaiful Sabtu	25 September 1981 (aged 21)	(Football Association of Malaysia) Negeri Sembilan
7	MF	Ahmad Shahrul Azhar Sofian	24 October 1974 (aged 27)	(Football Association of Malaysia) Perak
8	DF	Mohd Nidzam Jamil	15 April 1980 (aged 22)	(Football Association of Malaysia) Selangor
9	MF	Eddy Helmi Abdul Manan	8 December 1979 (aged 22)	(Football Association of Malaysia) Johor
10	FW	Hairuddin Omar	29 September 1979 (aged 23)	(Football Association of Malaysia) Terengganu
11	MF	Mohd Fadzli Saari	1 January 1983 (aged 19)	(Football Association of Malaysia) Pahang
12	FW	Muhamad Khalid Jamlus	23 February 1977 (aged 25)	(Football Association of Malaysia) Perak
13	MF	Indra Putra Mahayuddin	2 September 1981 (aged 21)	(Football Association of Malaysia) Perak
14	FW	Mohd Hasmawi Hassan	4 August 1980 (aged 22)	(Football Association of Malaysia) Penang
15	FW	Zainizam Marjan	11 May 1980 (aged 22)	(Football Association of Malaysia) Sabah
16	MF	Shukor Adan	24 September 1979 (aged 23)	(Football Association of Malaysia) Selangor
17	MF	Muhammad Juzaili Samion	18 May 1981 (aged 21)	(Football Association of Malaysia) Pahang
18	DF	Kaironnisam Sahabudin Hussain	10 May 1979 (aged 23)	(Football Association of Malaysia) Pahang
19	DF	Irwan Fadzli Idrus	2 June 1981 (aged 21)	(Football Association of Malaysia) Kedah
20	GK	Mohd Syamsuri Mustafa	5 February 1981 (aged 21)	(Football Association of Malaysia) Terengganu

=== Maldives ===
Coach: (Slovakia) Jozef Jankech

No.	Pos.	Player	Date of birth (age)	Club
1	GK	Hassan Naseeh		(Football Association of Maldives) Valencia
2	DF	Ahmed Jazeel	26 January 1979 (aged 23)	(Football Association of Maldives) IFC
3	DF	Sabah Mohamed	18 April 1980 (aged 22)	(Football Association of Maldives) Valencia
4	DF	Hussain Habeeb	6 April 1980 (aged 22)	(Football Association of Maldives) Valencia
5	FW	Ibrahim Fazeel	9 October 1980 (aged 21)	(Football Association of Maldives) IFC
6	MF	Ahmed Sunain	24 September 1982 (aged 20)	(Football Association of Maldives) IFC
7	MF	Ibrahim Shiyam	3 February 1982 (aged 20)	(Football Association of Maldives) Victory
9	FW	Adam Lareef	1 July 1980 (aged 22)	(Football Association of Maldives) Victory
10	FW	Ali Umar	5 August 1980 (aged 22)	(Football Association of Maldives) Valencia
11	FW	Ilyas Ibrahim	25 January 1981 (aged 21)	(Football Association of Maldives) STELCO
12	FW	Ali Ashfaq	6 September 1985 (aged 17)	(Football Association of Maldives) Valencia
13	MF	Assad Abdul Ghanee	2 January 1976 (aged 26)	(Football Association of Maldives) Valencia
15	DF	Anwar Abdul Ghanee	17 September 1980 (aged 22)	(Football Association of Maldives) Valencia
16	MF	Mohamed Hussain	12 October 1979 (aged 22)	(Football Association of Maldives) New Radiant
17	DF	Ashraf Luthfy	16 June 1973 (aged 29)	(Football Association of Maldives) New Radiant
18	GK	Imran Mohamed	18 December 1980 (aged 21)	(Football Association of Maldives) Victory
19	DF	Ahmed Janah	2 April 1979 (aged 23)	(Football Association of Maldives) Victory
20	MF	Fareed Mohamed	29 August 1982 (aged 20)	(Football Association of Maldives) IFC

=== Oman ===
Coach: Rashid Jaber

No.	Pos.	Player	Date of birth (age)	Club
1	GK	Ibrahim Al-Hasani	1 June 1982 (aged 20)	
2	DF	Ahmed Awadh Al-Marzouq	5 July 1984 (aged 18)	(Oman Football Association) Dhofar
4	DF	Said Suwailim Al-Shoon	28 August 1983 (aged 19)	(Oman Football Association) Muscat
5	DF	Hussain Mustahil	3 May 1980 (aged 22)	(Oman Football Association) Al-Nasr
6	DF	Munir Ayil	17 September 1979 (aged 23)	(Oman Football Association) Oman
7	MF	Jamal Nabi Al-Balushi	22 December 1981 (aged 20)	(Oman Football Association) Al-Ahli
9	FW	Yousuf Shaaban	4 November 1982 (aged 19)	(Oman Football Association) Dhofar
10	MF	Fawzi Bashir	6 May 1984 (aged 18)	(Oman Football Association) Al-Nasr
11	MF	Taqi Mubarak Al-Siyabi	20 August 1978 (aged 24)	(Oman Football Association) Muscat
12	GK	Ali Al-Habsi	30 December 1981 (aged 20)	(Oman Football Association) Al-Nasr
13	MF	Abdullah Al-Saadi	1 January 1978 (aged 24)	(Oman Football Association) Al-Suwaiq
14	FW	Hani Al-Dhabit	15 October 1979 (aged 22)	(Qatar Football Association) Al-Sadd
15	DF	Nasser Al-Mukhaini	21 October 1983 (aged 18)	(Oman Football Association) Al-Orouba
16	DF	Hassan Mudhafar Al-Gheilani	26 June 1980 (aged 22)	(Oman Football Association) Al-Orouba
17	MF	Hassan Al-Hadhri	4 March 1982 (aged 20)	(Oman Football Association) Dhofar
18	FW	Ismail Al-Ajmi	9 June 1984 (aged 18)	(Oman Football Association) Muscat
19	DF	Nabil Ashoor	7 April 1982 (aged 20)	(Oman Football Association) Al-Nasr
20	FW	Hashim Saleh	15 October 1981 (aged 20)	(Oman Football Association) Al-Nasr
21	MF	Ahmed Hadid Al-Mukhaini	18 July 1984 (aged 18)	(Oman Football Association) Al-Taliya
22	GK	Badar Jumaa Al-Alawi	6 December 1981 (aged 20)	(Oman Football Association) Dhofar

=== South Korea ===
Coach: Park Hang-seo

No.	Pos.	Player	Date of birth (age)	Club
1	GK	Lee Woon-jae*	26 April 1973 (aged 29)	(Korea Football Association) Suwon Samsung Bluewings
2	DF	Cho Byung-kuk	1 July 1981 (aged 21)	(Korea Football Association) Suwon Samsung Bluewings
3	MF	Hyun Young-min	25 December 1979 (aged 22)	(Korea Football Association) Ulsan Hyundai Horangi
4	DF	Park Yo-seb	3 December 1980 (aged 21)	(Korea Football Association) Anyang LG Cheetahs
5	DF	Kim Young-chul*	30 June 1976 (aged 26)	(Korea Football Association) Seongnam Ilhwa Chunma
6	DF	Park Yong-ho	6 September 1981 (aged 21)	(Korea Football Association) Anyang LG Cheetahs
7	MF	Byun Sung-hwan	22 December 1979 (aged 22)	(Korea Football Association) Ulsan Hyundai Horangi
8	MF	Kim Do-heon	14 July 1982 (aged 20)	(Korea Football Association) Suwon Samsung Bluewings
9	FW	Lee Chun-soo	9 July 1981 (aged 21)	(Korea Football Association) Ulsan Hyundai Horangi
10	MF	Park Ji-sung	25 February 1981 (aged 21)	(Japan Football Association) Kyoto Purple Sanga
11	FW	Choi Tae-uk	13 March 1981 (aged 21)	(Korea Football Association) Anyang LG Cheetahs
12	MF	Lee Young-pyo*	23 April 1977 (aged 25)	(Korea Football Association) Anyang LG Cheetahs
13	MF	Kim Dong-jin	29 January 1982 (aged 20)	(Korea Football Association) Anyang LG Cheetahs
14	FW	Park Kyu-seon	24 September 1981 (aged 21)	(Korea Football Association) Ulsan Hyundai Horangi
15	DF	Cho Sung-hwan	9 April 1982 (aged 20)	(Korea Football Association) Suwon Samsung Bluewings
16	GK	Kim Yong-dae	11 October 1979 (aged 22)	(Korea Football Association) Busan IPark
17	FW	Choi Sung-kuk	8 February 1983 (aged 19)	(Korea Football Association) Korea University
18	FW	Kim Eun-jung	8 April 1979 (aged 23)	(Korea Football Association) Daejeon Citizen
19	DF	Park Dong-hyuk	18 April 1979 (aged 23)	(Korea Football Association) Jeonbuk Hyundai Motors
20	FW	Lee Dong-gook	29 April 1979 (aged 23)	(Korea Football Association) Pohang Steelers

== Group B ==
=== Thailand ===
Coach: (England) Peter Withe

No.	Pos.	Player	Date of birth (age)	Club
1	GK	Kittisak Rawangpa*	3 January 1975 (aged 27)	(Football Association of Thailand) Sinthana
2	DF	Sarawut Treephan	15 October 1979 (aged 22)	(Football Association of Thailand) Bangkok Christian College
3	DF	Peeratat Phoruendee	15 March 1979 (aged 23)	(Football Association of Thailand) Bangkok Bank
4	DF	Anucha Kitphongsri	23 May 1983 (aged 19)	(Football Association of Thailand) Bangkok Bank
5	DF	Jetsada Jitsawad	5 August 1980 (aged 22)	(Football Association of Thailand) Tobacco Monopoly
6	MF	Narongchai Vachiraban	16 February 1981 (aged 21)	(Football Association of Thailand) Bangkok Christian College
7	DF	Jukkapant Punpee	2 April 1979 (aged 23)	(Football Association of Thailand) Bangkok Bank
8	MF	Issawa Singthong	10 October 1980 (aged 21)	(Football Association of Thailand) Royal Thai Air Force
9	FW	Manit Noywech	5 March 1980 (aged 22)	(Football Association of Thailand) Suphanburi
10	MF	Sakda Joemdee	7 April 1982 (aged 20)	(Football Association of Thailand) Osotspa
11	MF	Vimol Jankam	8 July 1979 (aged 23)	(Football Association of Thailand) Osotspa
12	DF	Nirut Surasiang	20 February 1979 (aged 23)	(Football Association of Thailand) BEC Tero Sasana
13	FW	Kiatisuk Senamuang*	11 August 1973 (aged 29)	(Vietnam Football Federation) Hoàng Anh Gia Lai
14	MF	Worawut Wangsawad	16 September 1981 (aged 21)	(Football Association of Thailand) Osotspa
15	FW	Paitoon Tiepma	13 September 1981 (aged 21)	(Football Association of Thailand) Osotspa
16	DF	Kraikiat Beadtaku	26 January 1982 (aged 20)	(Football Association of Thailand) Tobacco Monopoly
17	DF	Dusit Chalermsan*	22 April 1970 (aged 32)	(Football Association of Thailand) BEC Tero Sasana
18	GK	Panuwat Tanganurat	11 June 1980 (aged 22)	(Football Association of Thailand) Krung Thai Bank
19	FW	Wuttiya Yongant		(Football Association of Thailand) BEC Tero Sasana
20	FW	Datsakorn Thonglao	30 December 1983 (aged 18)	(Football Association of Thailand) BEC Tero Sasana

=== United Arab Emirates ===
Coach: (England) Roy Hodgson

No.	Pos.	Player	Date of birth (age)	Club
1	GK	Ahmed Salem	12 April 1979 (aged 23)	(United Arab Emirates Football Association) Al-Wasl
2	DF	Yousif Abdulla Mohamed	9 January 1980 (aged 22)	(United Arab Emirates Football Association) Al-Fujairah
3	DF	Mohammed Qassim	9 November 1981 (aged 20)	(United Arab Emirates Football Association) Al-Ahli
4	DF	Khalid Ali	24 March 1981 (aged 21)	(United Arab Emirates Football Association) Al-Jazira
5	MF	Nawaf Mubarak	31 August 1981 (aged 21)	(United Arab Emirates Football Association) Al-Sharjah
6	DF	Jaleel Abdulrahman	20 October 1976 (aged 25)	(United Arab Emirates Football Association) Al-Shaab
7	FW	Faisal Ali Hassan	28 December 1981 (aged 20)	(United Arab Emirates Football Association) Al-Ain
8	DF	Omar Ali Omar	16 June 1981 (aged 21)	(United Arab Emirates Football Association) Al-Wahda
9	FW	Salem Saad	1 September 1978 (aged 24)	(United Arab Emirates Football Association) Al-Shabab
10	MF	Subait Khater	27 February 1980 (aged 22)	(United Arab Emirates Football Association) Al-Ain
11	FW	Faisal Khalil	4 December 1982 (aged 19)	(United Arab Emirates Football Association) Al-Ahli
12	MF	Abdulrahim Jumaa	23 May 1979 (aged 23)	(United Arab Emirates Football Association) Al-Wahda
13	DF	Abdulla Ali Musabbeh	28 May 1980 (aged 22)	(United Arab Emirates Football Association) Al-Ain
14	DF	Fayez Jumaa	12 February 1981 (aged 21)	(United Arab Emirates Football Association) Al-Sharjah
15	MF	Fahed Masoud	31 December 1980 (aged 21)	(United Arab Emirates Football Association) Al-Wahda
16	MF	Hasan Ali	16 December 1981 (aged 20)	(United Arab Emirates Football Association) Al-Ahli
17	GK	Waleed Salem Sulaiman	28 October 1980 (aged 21)	(United Arab Emirates Football Association) Al-Ain
18	MF	Haider Alo Ali	25 December 1979 (aged 22)	(United Arab Emirates Football Association) Al-Wahda
19	FW	Saeed Al-Kass	20 February 1976 (aged 26)	(United Arab Emirates Football Association) Al-Sharjah
20	MF	Salem Khamis	19 September 1980 (aged 22)	(United Arab Emirates Football Association) Al-Ahli

=== Vietnam ===
Coach: Nguyễn Thành Vinh

No.	Pos.	Player	Date of birth (age)	Club
1	GK	Nguyễn Thế Anh	21 September 1981 (aged 21)	(Vietnam Football Federation) Sông Lam Nghệ An
2	DF	Nguyễn Duy Đông		(Vietnam Football Federation) Thể Công
3	DF	Nguyễn Huy Hoàng	4 January 1981 (aged 21)	(Vietnam Football Federation) Sông Lam Nghệ An
4	MF	Nguyễn Ngọc Tú	3 January 1982 (aged 20)	(Vietnam Football Federation) Sông Lam Nghệ An
5	DF	Lê Anh Dũng	22 January 1979 (aged 23)	(Vietnam Football Federation) Công An Hà Nội
6	DF	Nguyễn Hoàng Vương	7 October 1981 (aged 20)	(Vietnam Football Federation) Gạch Đồng Tâm
7	MF	Phan Văn Tài Em	23 April 1982 (aged 20)	(Vietnam Football Federation) Gạch Đồng Tâm
9	FW	Phùng Thanh Phương		(Vietnam Football Federation) Ngân Hàng Đông Á
10	FW	Nguyễn Minh Nghĩa		(Vietnam Football Federation) Đồng Tháp
11	FW	Thạch Bảo Khanh	25 April 1979 (aged 23)	(Vietnam Football Federation) Thể Công
12	MF	Nguyễn Minh Phương	5 July 1980 (aged 22)	(Vietnam Football Federation) Cảng Sài Gòn
14	FW	Đặng Thanh Phương	17 April 1981 (aged 21)	(Vietnam Football Federation) Thể Công
15	DF	Vũ Như Thành	28 August 1981 (aged 21)	(Vietnam Football Federation) Thể Công
16	GK	Bùi Quang Huy	24 July 1982 (aged 20)	(Vietnam Football Federation) Nam Định
17	MF	Lê Hồng Minh	15 September 1978 (aged 24)	(Vietnam Football Federation) Thanh Hoá
19	DF	Phạm Xuân Phú	16 April 1982 (aged 20)	(Vietnam Football Federation) Nam Định
20	FW	Phạm Văn Quyến	29 April 1984 (aged 18)	(Vietnam Football Federation) Sông Lam Nghệ An
21	MF	Hồ Thanh Thưởng		(Vietnam Football Federation) Sông Lam Nghệ An
22	DF	Võ Bá Khôi		(Vietnam Football Federation) Lâm Đồng
25	GK	Nguyễn Mạnh Dũng	17 April 1981 (aged 21)	(Vietnam Football Federation) Hải Phòng

=== Yemen ===
Coach: (Egypt) Mahmoud Abou-Regaila

No.	Pos.	Player	Date of birth (age)	Club
1	GK	Muaadh Abdulkhalek	3 January 1972 (aged 30)	(Yemen Football Association) Al-Ahli Sanaa
2	DF	Anwar Al-Srouri	5 May 1982 (aged 20)	(Yemen Football Association) Al-Wehda Sanaa
3	MF	Nashwan Al-Haggam	23 October 1983 (aged 18)	(Yemen Football Association) Al-Shaab Ibb
4	DF	Khaled Afarah	21 January 1974 (aged 28)	(Yemen Football Association) Al-Tilal
5	MF	Asaad Al-Qamasi	1 April 1981 (aged 21)	(Yemen Football Association) Al-Ahli Sanaa
6	DF	Salem Balhamar	2 May 1977 (aged 25)	(Yemen Football Association) Al-Ahli Sanaa
7	MF	Mahmood Al-Kahsa	1 March 1982 (aged 20)	(Yemen Football Association) Al-Ittihad Ibb
8	MF	Saleh Al-Shehri	23 October 1983 (aged 18)	(Yemen Football Association) Al-Hilal Al-Sahili
9	MF	Nasser Ghazi	3 May 1981 (aged 21)	(Yemen Football Association) Al-Wehda Sanaa
10	FW	Ali Al-Nono	7 June 1980 (aged 22)	(Yemen Football Association) Al-Ahli Sanaa
11	MF	Ihab Al-Nuzaili	30 December 1981 (aged 20)	(Yemen Football Association) Al-Shaab Ibb
12	FW	Yasser Basuhai	27 March 1979 (aged 23)	(Yemen Football Association) Al-Hilal Al-Sahili
13	FW	Mohammed Al-Zuraiqi	4 May 1983 (aged 19)	(Yemen Football Association) Al-Hilal Al-Sahili
14	DF	Ahmed Al-Zuraiqi	27 March 1979 (aged 23)	(Yemen Football Association) Al-Shaab Sanaa
16	FW	Adel Al-Salimi	6 July 1979 (aged 23)	(Yemen Football Association) Al-Ahli Sanaa
18	MF	Fadhl Al-Aroomi	13 December 1981 (aged 20)	(Yemen Football Association) Al-Saqr
19	FW	Mohammed Al-Tahoos	25 November 1982 (aged 19)	(Yemen Football Association) Al-Shabab Al-Jeel
20	DF	Qais Mohammed	2 July 1982 (aged 20)	(Yemen Football Association) Al-Tilal
21	GK	Fawzi Ba-Muhid	2 May 1979 (aged 23)	(Yemen Football Association) Al-Hilal Al-Sahili
23	MF	Ali Al-Omqi	13 March 1983 (aged 19)	(Yemen Football Association) Al-Shaab Hadramaut

== Group C ==
=== Bangladesh ===
Coach: (Austria) György Kottán

No.	Pos.	Player	Date of birth (age)	Club
1	GK	Biplob Bhattacharjee	7 January 1981 (aged 21)	(Bangladesh Football Federation) Muktijoddha Sangsad
2	DF	Firoj Mahmud Titu	8 July 1974 (aged 28)	(Bangladesh Football Federation) Muktijoddha Sangsad
3	DF	Mohammed Sujan	1 June 1982 (aged 20)	(Bangladesh Football Federation) Muktijoddha Sangsad
4	DF	Rajani Kanta Barman	12 May 1976 (aged 26)	(Bangladesh Football Federation) Muktijoddha Sangsad
5	DF	Papel Mahmud	3 February 1982 (aged 20)	(Bangladesh Football Federation) Muktijoddha Sangsad
6	MF	Mohammed Monwar Hossain	30 August 1979 (aged 23)	(Bangladesh Football Federation) Mohammedan Dhaka
7	MF	Motiur Rahman Munna	1 September 1979 (aged 23)	(Bangladesh Football Federation) Mohammedan Dhaka
8	MF	Arman Mia	10 July 1977 (aged 25)	(Bangladesh Football Federation) Muktijoddha Sangsad
10	FW	Alfaz Ahmed	6 June 1973 (aged 29)	(Bangladesh Football Federation) Mohammedan Dhaka
11	FW	Rokonuzzaman Kanchan	22 June 1982 (aged 20)	(Bangladesh Football Federation) Abahani Limited Dhaka
13	MF	Arif Khan Joy	20 November 1971 (aged 30)	(Bangladesh Football Federation) Mohammedan Dhaka
14	MF	Mustafa Anwar Parvez	25 July 1982 (aged 20)	(Bangladesh Football Federation) Abahani Limited Dhaka
15	FW	Mujibur Rahman Ritu	1 October 1980 (aged 21)	(Bangladesh Football Federation) Arambagh Krira Sangha
16	MF	Rezaul Karim Liton	11 December 1980 (aged 21)	(Bangladesh Football Federation) Abahani Limited Dhaka
17	DF	Amit Khan Shuvra	30 November 1980 (aged 21)	(Bangladesh Football Federation) Abahani Limited Dhaka
18	FW	Maksudul Alam Bulbul	19 July 1981 (aged 21)	(Bangladesh Football Federation) Sheikh Russel
19	DF	Mahmudul Hasan	18 July 1982 (aged 20)	(Bangladesh Football Federation) Mohammedan Dhaka
20	GK	Rokib Mahamud Apple	1 January 1982 (aged 20)	(Bangladesh Football Federation) Sheikh Russel
21	MF	Faisal Mahmud	16 January 1983 (aged 19)	(Bangladesh Football Federation) Brothers Union
22	FW	Saiful Islam Saif	10 February 1980 (aged 22)	(Bangladesh Football Federation) Mohammedan Dhaka

=== China ===
Coach: Shen Xiangfu

No.	Pos.	Player	Date of birth (age)	Club
1	GK	An Qi	21 June 1981 (aged 21)	(Chinese Football Association) Dalian Shide
3	DF	Du Wei	9 February 1982 (aged 20)	(Chinese Football Association) Shanghai Shenhua
4	DF	Zhou Lin	4 February 1981 (aged 21)	(Chinese Football Association) Chongqing Lifan
5	DF	Wang Sheng	1 May 1981 (aged 21)	(Chinese Football Association) Dalian Shide
6	MF	Hu Zhaojun	1 March 1981 (aged 21)	(Chinese Football Association) Dalian Shide
7	MF	Lu Jiang	30 June 1981 (aged 21)	(Chinese Football Association) Beijing Guoan
8	MF	Gao Ming	19 February 1982 (aged 20)	(Chinese Football Association) Qingdao Hademen
9	MF	Sui Yong	27 January 1981 (aged 21)	(Chinese Football Association) Qingdao Hademen
10	MF	Yan Song	20 March 1981 (aged 21)	(Chinese Football Association) Dalian Shide
11	MF	Sun Xiang	15 January 1982 (aged 20)	(Chinese Football Association) Shanghai Shenhua
12	MF	Lu Feng	12 November 1981 (aged 20)	(Chinese Football Association) Henan Jianye
13	FW	Wang Xinxin	27 April 1981 (aged 21)	(Chinese Football Association) Liaoning Bird
14	DF	Xu Liang	12 August 1981 (aged 21)	(Chinese Football Association) Liaoning Bird
15	DF	Zhang Yaokun	17 April 1981 (aged 21)	(Chinese Football Association) Dalian Shide
16	FW	Qu Bo	15 July 1981 (aged 21)	(Chinese Football Association) Qingdao Hademen
17	FW	Yu Tao	15 November 1981 (aged 20)	(Chinese Football Association) Shanghai Shenhua
18	GK	Yang Jun	10 June 1981 (aged 21)	(Chinese Football Association) Qingdao Hademen
19	MF	Cao Yang	15 December 1981 (aged 20)	(Chinese Football Association) Tianjin TEDA

=== India ===
Coach: (England) Stephen Constantine

No.	Pos.	Player	Date of birth (age)	Club
1	GK	Rajat Ghosh Dastidar	8 October 1979 (aged 22)	(All India Football Federation) Mohun Bagan
3	DF	Satish Kumar Bharti	26 January 1982 (aged 20)	(All India Football Federation) Mohun Bagan
4	DF	Debjit Ghosh	23 February 1974 (aged 28)	(All India Football Federation) Mohun Bagan
6	MF	Shanmugam Venkatesh	21 November 1978 (aged 23)	(All India Football Federation) East Bengal
7	MF	Tomba Singh	3 April 1982 (aged 20)	(All India Football Federation) Salgaocar
8	MF	Renedy Singh	20 June 1979 (aged 23)	(All India Football Federation) Mohun Bagan
9	FW	Abhishek Yadav	10 June 1980 (aged 22)	(All India Football Federation) Mahindra United
10	FW	Bijen Singh	10 February 1979 (aged 23)	(All India Football Federation) Dempo
11	MF	Jo Paul Ancheri	2 August 1975 (aged 27)	(All India Football Federation) JCT Mills
12	FW	Alex Ambrose	8 September 1982 (aged 20)	(All India Football Federation) Salgaocar
13	DF	Manitombi Singh	10 June 1981 (aged 21)	(All India Football Federation) Salgaocar
14	DF	Mahesh Gawli	23 January 1980 (aged 22)	(All India Football Federation) Churchill Brothers
15	FW	Bhaichung Bhutia	15 December 1976 (aged 25)	(All India Football Federation) Mohun Bagan
16	DF	Samir Subash Naik	8 August 1979 (aged 23)	(All India Football Federation) Dempo
17	DF	Deepak Mondal	12 October 1979 (aged 22)	(All India Football Federation) East Bengal
18	MF	Krishnan Nair Ajayan	30 May 1979 (aged 23)	(All India Football Federation) State Bank of Travancore
19	FW	Parveen Kumar	2 July 1980 (aged 22)	(All India Football Federation) Punjab Police
20	GK	Sangram Mukherjee	6 November 1981 (aged 20)	(All India Football Federation) East Bengal
21	GK	Naseem Akhtar	10 July 1980 (aged 22)	(All India Football Federation) Mahindra United

=== Turkmenistan ===
Coach: (Ukraine) Volodymyr Bezsonov

No.	Pos.	Player	Date of birth (age)	Club
1	GK	Pawel Harçik	5 April 1979 (aged 23)	(Russian Football Union) Rubin Kazan
2	MF	Arsen Bagdasarýan	11 March 1977 (aged 25)	(Football Federation of Turkmenistan) Nisa Aşgabat
3	DF	Rasim Kerimow	13 July 1979 (aged 23)	(Ukrainian Association of Football) Vorskla Poltava
4	DF	Baýramdurdy Meredow	27 March 1979 (aged 23)	(Football Federation of Turkmenistan) Nebitçi Balkanabat
5	DF	Ýagmyrmyrat Annamyradow	19 October 1982 (aged 19)	(Football Federation of Turkmenistan) Köpetdag Aşgabat
6	MF	Nazar Baýramow	4 September 1982 (aged 20)	(Ukrainian Association of Football) Vorskla Poltava
7	DF	Alik Haýdarow	27 April 1981 (aged 21)	(Football Federation of Turkmenistan) Köpetdag Aşgabat
8	MF	Artýom Nazarow	20 June 1977 (aged 25)	(Football Federation of Turkmenistan) Nisa Aşgabat
9	FW	Wladimir Baýramow	2 August 1980 (aged 22)	(Russian Football Union) Metallurg Krasnoyarsk
10	FW	Didargylyç Urazow	27 February 1977 (aged 25)	(Kazakhstan Football Federation) Irtysh Pavlodar
11	FW	Guwançmuhammet Öwekow	2 February 1981 (aged 21)	(Ukrainian Association of Football) Arsenal Kyiv
12	DF	Boris Borowik	20 August 1979 (aged 23)	(Football Federation of Turkmenistan) Nisa Aşgabat
13	MF	Şöhrat Durdyýew	23 June 1982 (aged 20)	(Football Federation of Turkmenistan) Köpetdag Aşgabat
14	MF	Arif Mirzoýew	13 January 1980 (aged 22)	(Football Federation of Turkmenistan) Nisa Aşgabat
15	MF	Zarif Ereşow	28 June 1979 (aged 23)	(Football Federation of Turkmenistan) Garagum Türkmenabat
16	GK	Pawel Matus	26 May 1982 (aged 20)	(Football Federation of Turkmenistan) Nisa Aşgabat
17	DF	Wugar Abdullaýew	5 November 1981 (aged 20)	(Football Federation of Turkmenistan) Nisa Aşgabat

== Group D ==
=== Bahrain ===
Coach: (Germany) Wolfgang Sidka

No.	Pos.	Player	Date of birth (age)	Club
1	GK	Abdulrahman Abdulkarim	13 May 1980 (aged 22)	(Bahrain Football Association) Al-Hala
2	MF	Mohamed Husain	31 July 1980 (aged 22)	(Saudi Arabian Football Federation) Al-Ahli
3	DF	Abdulla Al-Marzooqi	12 December 1980 (aged 21)	(Bahrain Football Association) Al-Riffa
4	DF	Abdulaziz Al-Dosari	29 April 1978 (aged 24)	(Bahrain Football Association) Al-Busaiteen
7	MF	Sayed Mahmood Jalal	5 November 1980 (aged 21)	(Bahrain Football Association) Al-Shabab
9	FW	Mohamed Jaffar	13 November 1979 (aged 22)	(Bahrain Football Association) Al-Muharraq
10	FW	Mohamed Salmeen	4 November 1980 (aged 21)	(Bahrain Football Association) Al-Muharraq
11	DF	Faisal Abdulaziz	8 October 1968 (aged 33)	(Bahrain Football Association) Al-Riffa
13	MF	Hussain Salman	20 December 1982 (aged 19)	(Bahrain Football Association) Al-Shabab
14	DF	Salman Isa	12 July 1977 (aged 25)	(Bahrain Football Association) Al-Riffa
16	MF	Hadi Ali Mohamed	13 April 1981 (aged 21)	(Bahrain Football Association) Sitra
17	MF	Rashid Al-Dosari	24 March 1980 (aged 22)	(Qatar Football Association) Al-Markhiya
18	FW	Mohamed Salman	3 October 1980 (aged 21)	(Bahrain Football Association) Al-Riffa
19	FW	Husain Ali	31 December 1981 (aged 20)	(Bahrain Football Association) Al-Muharraq
20	MF	Ahmed Hassan Taleb	29 March 1980 (aged 22)	(Bahrain Football Association) Al-Riffa
21	GK	Abdulla Saad Ali	10 July 1982 (aged 20)	(Bahrain Football Association) Al-Riffa
22	GK	Ali Saeed Abdulla	24 September 1979 (aged 23)	(Bahrain Football Association) Al-Ahli
24	MF	A'ala Hubail	25 June 1982 (aged 20)	(Bahrain Football Association) Al-Ahli
25	MF	Ismaeel Saleh	11 August 1980 (aged 22)	(Bahrain Football Association) Al-Bahrain
26	FW	Nayef Yusuf	7 May 1979 (aged 23)	(Bahrain Football Association) Al-Muharraq

=== Japan ===
Coach: Masakuni Yamamoto

No.	Pos.	Player	Date of birth (age)	Club
1	GK	Yosuke Fujigaya	13 February 1981 (aged 21)	(Japan Football Association) Consadole Sapporo
2	DF	Teruyuki Moniwa	8 September 1981 (aged 21)	(Japan Football Association) FC Tokyo
3	DF	Shohei Ikeda	27 April 1981 (aged 21)	(Japan Football Association) Shimizu S-Pulse
4	DF	Daisuke Nasu	10 October 1981 (aged 20)	(Japan Football Association) Yokohama F. Marinos
5	DF	Yuichi Komano	25 July 1981 (aged 21)	(Japan Football Association) Sanfrecce Hiroshima
6	MF	Yuki Abe	6 September 1981 (aged 21)	(Japan Football Association) JEF United Chiba
7	MF	Yoshito Okubo	9 June 1982 (aged 20)	(Japan Football Association) Cerezo Osaka
8	MF	Kazuyuki Morisaki	9 May 1981 (aged 21)	(Japan Football Association) Sanfrecce Hiroshima
9	FW	Daisuke Matsui	11 May 1981 (aged 21)	(Japan Football Association) Kyoto Purple Sanga
10	FW	Ryoichi Maeda	9 October 1981 (aged 20)	(Japan Football Association) Júbilo Iwata
11	MF	Tatsuya Tanaka	27 November 1982 (aged 19)	(Japan Football Association) Urawa Red Diamonds
12	DF	Yuichi Nemoto	21 July 1981 (aged 21)	(Japan Football Association) Cerezo Osaka
13	MF	Keita Suzuki	8 July 1981 (aged 21)	(Japan Football Association) Urawa Red Diamonds
14	MF	Naohiro Ishikawa	12 May 1981 (aged 21)	(Japan Football Association) FC Tokyo
15	DF	Hikaru Mita	1 August 1981 (aged 21)	(Japan Football Association) Albirex Niigata
16	MF	Takuya Nozawa	12 August 1981 (aged 21)	(Japan Football Association) Kashima Antlers
17	MF	Hayuma Tanaka	31 July 1982 (aged 20)	(Japan Football Association) Tokyo Verdy 1969
18	GK	Takaya Kurokawa	7 April 1981 (aged 21)	(Japan Football Association) Shimizu S-Pulse
19	FW	Satoshi Nakayama	7 November 1981 (aged 20)	(Japan Football Association) Gamba Osaka
20	MF	Takeshi Aoki	28 September 1982 (aged 20)	(Japan Football Association) Kashima Antlers

=== Palestine ===
Coach: (Poland) Andrzej Wiśniewski

No.	Pos.	Player	Date of birth (age)	Club
1	GK	Abdullah Al-Saidawi	4 August 1979 (aged 23)	(Palestinian Football Association) Hilal Al-Quds
2	DF	Yousef Parekh	16 January 1981 (aged 21)	
3	DF	Hamada Eshbair	9 March 1980 (aged 22)	(Palestinian Football Association) Khidmat Al-Shatia
4	DF	Hazem Mohtasib	24 May 1979 (aged 23)	(Palestinian Football Association) Shabab Al-Khalil
5	DF	Saeb Jendeya	13 May 1975 (aged 27)	(Jordan Football Association) Al-Hussein
6	DF	Raji Ashour	7 February 1982 (aged 20)	(Palestinian Football Association) Shabab Rafah
7	DF	Ihab Abu-Jazar	1 September 1980 (aged 22)	(Palestinian Football Association) Al-Hilal Gaza
8	MF	Ibrahim Al-Sweirki	13 June 1979 (aged 23)	(Palestinian Football Association) Ittihad Al-Shejaiya
9	FW	Adham Abu-Nahia	13 May 1980 (aged 22)	
10	MF	Hassan Huthut	19 February 1980 (aged 22)	
11	FW	Fadi Lafi	23 March 1979 (aged 23)	(Jordan Football Association) Al-Faisaly
12	FW	Ziyad Al-Kord	15 January 1974 (aged 28)	(Saudi Arabian Football Federation) Abha
13	MF	Ahmed Abu-Thaher	23 January 1983 (aged 19)	(Palestinian Football Association) Al-Ittihad Nablus
14	MF	Mohamed Aziz Mohamed	1 January 1983 (aged 19)	
15	MF	Jobran Kahla	3 July 1980 (aged 22)	(Palestinian Football Association) Shabab Al-Bireh
16	FW	Mahmoud Awad	12 August 1981 (aged 21)	
17	MF	Jamal Al-Houli	21 February 1975 (aged 27)	(Palestinian Football Association) Shabab Rafah
18	DF	Rami Al-Rabi	4 March 1980 (aged 22)	(Palestinian Football Association) Shabab Al-Bireh
19	FW	Fadi Salem	20 July 1979 (aged 23)	(Palestinian Football Association) Markaz Tulkarem
22	GK	Ramzi Saleh	8 August 1980 (aged 22)	(Palestinian Football Association) Shabab Jabalia

=== Uzbekistan ===
Coach: Viktor Borisov

No.	Pos.	Player	Date of birth (age)	Club
1	GK	Mamur Ikromov	12 June 1982 (aged 20)	(Uzbekistan Football Association) Metallurg Bekabad
2	DF	Davron Adilov	22 April 1981 (aged 21)	(Uzbekistan Football Association) Qizilqum Zarafshon
3	DF	Asror Aliqulov	12 September 1978 (aged 24)	(Uzbekistan Football Association) Nasaf Qarshi
5	DF	Maksim Usmonov	5 February 1980 (aged 22)	(Uzbekistan Football Association) Navbahor Namangan
6	MF	Ruslan Vagapov	22 January 1980 (aged 22)	(Uzbekistan Football Association) Qizilqum Zarafshon
7	MF	Aleksey Nikolaev	5 September 1979 (aged 23)	(Uzbekistan Football Association) Qizilqum Zarafshon
8	MF	Bahromjon Haydarov	4 March 1978 (aged 24)	(Uzbekistan Football Association) Nasaf Qarshi
9	FW	Bakhtiyor Hamidullaev	7 March 1978 (aged 24)	(Uzbekistan Football Association) Andijon
10	FW	Ilkhom Muminjonov	21 January 1979 (aged 23)	(Uzbekistan Football Association) Traktor Tashkent
11	FW	Shuhrat Mirkholdirshoev	5 March 1982 (aged 20)	(Uzbekistan Football Association) Navbahor Namangan
12	GK	Aleksandr Korniychuk	30 October 1979 (aged 22)	(Uzbekistan Football Association) Shurtan Guzar
16	FW	Vadim Kotelnikov	23 January 1982 (aged 20)	(Uzbekistan Football Association) Navbahor Namangan
17	FW	Alisher Khalikov	20 April 1982 (aged 20)	(Uzbekistan Football Association) Neftchi Fergana
18	DF	Ilya Klikunov	9 August 1981 (aged 21)	(Uzbekistan Football Association) Dustlik Tashkent
19	DF	Kamoliddin Kenjaev	23 March 1982 (aged 20)	(Uzbekistan Football Association) Nasaf Qarshi
20	MF	Renat Bayramov	21 September 1979 (aged 23)	(Uzbekistan Football Association) Qizilqum Zarafshon
22	MF	Aleksey Klikunov	27 April 1979 (aged 23)	(Uzbekistan Football Association) Dustlik Tashkent

== Group E ==
=== Afghanistan ===
Coach: Mir Ali Asghar Akbarzada

No.	Pos.	Player	Date of birth (age)	Club
1	GK	Abdul Salem Jamshid	30 November 1980 (aged 21)	
3	DF	Mohammad Nasim		
4	DF	Bashir Ahmad Saadat	27 December 1981 (aged 20)	
5	DF	Rahil Ahmad Fourmoli	30 June 1976 (aged 26)	
6	MF	Mohammad Nasim Hussaini	4 June 1982 (aged 20)	
7	FW	Mohammad Zaki	30 November 1979 (aged 22)	
8	MF	Atiqullah		
9	MF	Sayed Dawood Shah		
10	MF	Najiballah Karimi	30 November 1978 (aged 23)	
11	MF	Mir Shafiqullah		
12	GK	Mohammad Sadiq		
13	MF	Mohammad Khalid Delawar	10 December 1986 (aged 15)	
14	DF	Mohammad Zarif		
15	FW	Sayed Tahir Shah	5 February 1980 (aged 22)	
16	MF	Rahman Ali Nazari	1 January 1982 (aged 20)	
17	DF	Khalil Ahmad		
18	MF	Sayed Maqsood Hashemi	15 September 1985 (aged 17)	
19	FW	Elyas Ahmad Manochehr		
20	DF	Ahmad Zia Azimi	30 November 1976 (aged 25)	

=== Iran ===
Coach: (Croatia) Branko Ivanković

No.	Pos.	Player	Date of birth (age)	Club
1	GK	Ebrahim Mirzapour	16 September 1978 (aged 24)	(Football Federation Islamic Republic of Iran) Foolad Khuzestan
2	DF	Mehdi Amirabadi	22 February 1979 (aged 23)	(Football Federation Islamic Republic of Iran) Saipa Tehran
3	DF	Yahya Golmohammadi	19 March 1971 (aged 31)	(Football Federation Islamic Republic of Iran) Persepolis
4	DF	Saeid Lotfi	25 February 1981 (aged 21)	(Football Federation Islamic Republic of Iran) Paykan Tehran
6	MF	Javad Nekounam	7 September 1980 (aged 22)	(Football Federation Islamic Republic of Iran) PAS Tehran
7	MF	Iman Mobali	3 November 1982 (aged 19)	(Football Federation Islamic Republic of Iran) Foolad Khuzestan
9	FW	Javad Kazemian	23 April 1981 (aged 21)	(Football Federation Islamic Republic of Iran) Saipa Tehran
10	FW	Ali Daei	21 March 1969 (aged 33)	(German Football Association) Hertha BSC
11	FW	Alireza Vahedi Nikbakht	30 June 1980 (aged 22)	(Football Federation Islamic Republic of Iran) Esteghlal Tehran
12	GK	Mehdi Rahmati	2 February 1983 (aged 19)	(Football Federation Islamic Republic of Iran) Fajr Sepasi Shiraz
13	MF	Hossein Kaebi	23 September 1985 (aged 17)	(Football Federation Islamic Republic of Iran) Foolad Khuzestan
14	MF	Moharram Navidkia	1 November 1982 (aged 19)	(Football Federation Islamic Republic of Iran) Sepahan Isfahan
15	MF	Abolfazl Hajizadeh	23 August 1981 (aged 21)	(Football Federation Islamic Republic of Iran) Tractorsazi Tabriz
16	FW	Mohsen Bayatinia	9 April 1980 (aged 22)	(Football Federation Islamic Republic of Iran) PAS Tehran
17	MF	Ali Badavi	20 June 1982 (aged 20)	(Football Federation Islamic Republic of Iran) Foolad Khuzestan
18	FW	Siavash Akbarpour	21 January 1985 (aged 17)	(Football Federation Islamic Republic of Iran) Fajr Sepasi Shiraz
19	DF	Jalal Kameli Mofrad	15 May 1981 (aged 21)	(Football Federation Islamic Republic of Iran) Foolad Khuzestan
20	DF	Mohammad Nosrati	10 January 1981 (aged 21)	(Football Federation Islamic Republic of Iran) PAS Tehran
21	DF	Hamid Azizzadeh	6 June 1981 (aged 21)	(Football Federation Islamic Republic of Iran) PAS Tehran
22	GK	Ershad Yousefi	19 September 1981 (aged 21)	(Football Federation Islamic Republic of Iran) Aboumoslem Khorasan

=== Lebanon ===
Coach: (France) Richard Tardy

No.	Pos.	Player	Date of birth (age)	Club
1	GK	Abdo Tafeh	1 October 1979 (aged 22)	(Lebanese Football Association) Nejmeh
4	DF	Hassan Al-Husseini	12 August 1979 (aged 23)	
5	DF	Ahmed Naamani	12 October 1979 (aged 22)	(Lebanese Football Association) Safa
6	DF	Faisal Antar	20 December 1978 (aged 23)	(Lebanese Football Association) Tadamon Sour
7	MF	Agop Donabidian	28 October 1981 (aged 20)	(Lebanese Football Association) Homenetmen
8	MF	Fouad Hijazi	27 June 1973 (aged 29)	(Lebanese Football Association) Sagesse
9	FW	Haitham Zein	6 January 1979 (aged 23)	(Lebanese Football Association) Tadamon Sour
10	MF	Abbas Atwi	12 September 1979 (aged 23)	(Lebanese Football Association) Nejmeh
11	FW	Fadi Ghosn	15 May 1979 (aged 23)	(Lebanese Football Association) Al-Ansar
12	MF	Sami El-Choum	22 June 1982 (aged 20)	(Lebanese Football Association) Al-Ansar
13	DF	Hussein Mostafa	1 January 1979 (aged 23)	(Lebanese Football Association) Akhaa Ahli Aley
14	DF	Ossama Haidar	14 January 1980 (aged 22)	(Lebanese Football Association) Tadamon Sour
15	MF	Yahia Hashem	14 July 1981 (aged 21)	(Lebanese Football Association) Nejmeh
16	FW	Mohammad Kassas	1 July 1976 (aged 26)	(Lebanese Football Association) Olympic Beirut
17	MF	Issa Ramadan	29 January 1982 (aged 20)	(Lebanese Football Association) Sagesse
18	MF	Bilal Hajo	1 February 1980 (aged 22)	(Lebanese Football Association) Tadamon Sour
19	DF	Youssef Mohamad	1 July 1980 (aged 22)	(Lebanese Football Association) Olympic Beirut
20	MF	Nasrat Al-Jamal	1 July 1980 (aged 22)	(Lebanese Football Association) Tadamon Sour
21	GK	Toni Daher	2 February 1979 (aged 23)	(Lebanese Football Association) Sagesse
23	MF	Arsen Melikian	21 December 1982 (aged 19)	

=== Qatar ===
Coach: (France) Alex Dupont

No.	Pos.	Player	Date of birth (age)	Club
1	GK	Basel Samih	17 June 1981 (aged 21)	(Qatar Football Association) Al-Sadd
3	DF	Saghayer Al-Shammari	16 October 1981 (aged 20)	(Qatar Football Association) Al-Ittihad
5	FW	Ali Rahma Al-Marri	27 December 1983 (aged 18)	(Qatar Football Association) Al-Rayyan
6	DF	Meshal Mubarak	25 February 1982 (aged 20)	(Qatar Football Association) Qatar SC
7	FW	Mohammed Yasser	10 October 1982 (aged 19)	(Qatar Football Association) Al-Rayyan
8	DF	Saad Al-Shammari	6 August 1980 (aged 22)	(Qatar Football Association) Al-Ittihad
9	FW	Sayed Ali Bechir	21 June 1980 (aged 22)	(Qatar Football Association) Al-Arabi
10	FW	Waleed Hamzah	17 June 1982 (aged 20)	(Qatar Football Association) Al-Arabi
11	MF	Ahmed Mohamed Musa	7 October 1982 (aged 19)	(Qatar Football Association) Al-Wakrah
12	DF	Khalid Saleh Al-Qahtani	13 July 1981 (aged 21)	(Qatar Football Association) Qatar SC
13	MF	Wesam Rizik	5 February 1981 (aged 21)	(Qatar Football Association) Qatar SC
14	DF	Ibrahim Al-Ghanim	27 June 1983 (aged 19)	(Qatar Football Association) Al-Arabi
15	MF	Mugib Hamid	1 June 1982 (aged 20)	(Qatar Football Association) Al-Ittihad
16	FW	Mohammed Gholam	8 November 1980 (aged 21)	(Qatar Football Association) Al-Sadd
17	MF	Bilal Abdulrahman	14 November 1983 (aged 18)	(Qatar Football Association) Al-Ahli
18	MF	Muamer Abdulrab	20 August 1982 (aged 20)	(Qatar Football Association) Qatar SC
19	DF	Abdulrahman Mahmoud	27 December 1976 (aged 25)	(Qatar Football Association) Al-Sadd
21	DF	Fawaz Al-Khater	27 September 1981 (aged 21)	(Qatar Football Association) Al-Arabi
22	GK	Essa Al-Kaabi	7 April 1980 (aged 22)	(Qatar Football Association) Al-Sadd
26	GK	Salman Ahmed Al-Ansari	1 January 1983 (aged 19)	(Qatar Football Association) Al-Rayyan

== Group F ==
=== Hong Kong ===
Coach: Lai Sun Cheung

No.	Pos.	Player	Date of birth (age)	Club
1	GK	Fan Chun Yip	1 May 1976 (aged 26)	(Football Association of Hong Kong, China) Happy Valley
2	DF	Yau Kin Wai	4 January 1973 (aged 29)	(Football Association of Hong Kong, China) South China
3	DF	Lee Chi Ho	16 November 1982 (aged 19)	(Football Association of Hong Kong, China) South China
4	MF	Chan Wai Ho	24 April 1982 (aged 20)	(Football Association of Hong Kong, China) Buler Rangers
5	DF	Kwok Wing Sun	11 September 1981 (aged 21)	(Football Association of Hong Kong, China) Buler Rangers
6	DF	Man Pei Tak	16 February 1982 (aged 20)	(Football Association of Hong Kong, China) Buler Rangers
7	MF	Chan Yiu Lun	20 July 1982 (aged 20)	(Football Association of Hong Kong, China) Buler Rangers
8	FW	Pun Wing On	28 March 1981 (aged 21)	(Football Association of Hong Kong, China) Buler Rangers
9	DF	Cheung Kwok Lung	13 February 1984 (aged 18)	(Football Association of Hong Kong, China) Double Flower
10	MF	Chow Man Ho	3 March 1982 (aged 20)	(Football Association of Hong Kong, China) Fukien
11	MF	Li Chun Yip	15 September 1981 (aged 21)	(Football Association of Hong Kong, China) Happy Valley
12	MF	Lo Kwan Yee	9 October 1984 (aged 17)	(Football Association of Hong Kong, China) Buler Rangers
13	FW	Chan Ho Man	14 May 1980 (aged 22)	(Football Association of Hong Kong, China) South China
14	MF	Lo Chi Kwan	18 March 1981 (aged 21)	(Football Association of Hong Kong, China) Sun Hei
15	MF	Lee Wai Lun	7 March 1981 (aged 21)	(Football Association of Hong Kong, China) Sun Hei
16	MF	Cheung Kin Fung	1 January 1984 (aged 18)	(Football Association of Hong Kong, China) Buler Rangers
17	MF	Law Chun Bong	25 January 1981 (aged 21)	(Football Association of Hong Kong, China) Sun Hei
18	GK	Chi Chiu Goldbert	1 August 1981 (aged 21)	(Football Association of Hong Kong, China) Buler Rangers
19	DF	Ng Wai Chiu	22 October 1981 (aged 20)	(Chinese Football Association) Guangzhou Pharmaceutical
20	DF	Poon Yiu Cheuk	19 September 1977 (aged 25)	(Football Association of Hong Kong, China) Happy Valley

=== Kuwait ===
Coach: (Serbia and Montenegro) Radojko Avramović

No.	Pos.	Player	Date of birth (age)	Club
1	GK	Shehab Kankoune	28 April 1981 (aged 21)	(Kuwait Football Association) Kazma
2	MF	Mohammad Eissa	22 September 1980 (aged 22)	(Kuwait Football Association) Al-Arabi
3	MF	Saqer Khudhayer	26 October 1981 (aged 20)	(Kuwait Football Association) Al-Sulaibikhat
4	MF	Yousef Zayed	2 September 1979 (aged 23)	(Kuwait Football Association) Al-Kuwait
5	DF	Nohair Al-Shammari	12 July 1976 (aged 26)	(Kuwait Football Association) Al-Qadsia
6	MF	Meshari Faihan	16 February 1980 (aged 22)	(Kuwait Football Association) Al-Nasr
7	MF	Khaled Abdulqoddus	9 June 1980 (aged 22)	(Kuwait Football Association) Al-Arabi
8	MF	Saleh Al-Buraiki	27 February 1977 (aged 25)	(Kuwait Football Association) Al-Salmiya
9	FW	Bashar Abdullah	12 October 1977 (aged 24)	(Kuwait Football Association) Al-Salmiya
10	FW	Khalaf Al-Salamah	25 July 1979 (aged 23)	(Kuwait Football Association) Al-Jahra
11	DF	Mohammad Al-Failakawi	7 September 1980 (aged 22)	(Kuwait Football Association) Al-Sahel
12	MF	Hamad Al-Tayyar	10 February 1982 (aged 20)	(Kuwait Football Association) Kazma
13	DF	Musaed Neda	8 July 1983 (aged 19)	(Kuwait Football Association) Al-Qadsia
14	DF	Mohammad Jarragh	10 November 1981 (aged 20)	(Kuwait Football Association) Al-Arabi
15	MF	Waleed Ali	3 November 1980 (aged 21)	(Kuwait Football Association) Khaitan
16	FW	Abdullah Nahar	31 March 1981 (aged 21)	(Kuwait Football Association) Al-Fahaheel
18	DF	Mohammad Fahad	17 January 1981 (aged 21)	(Kuwait Football Association) Al-Qadsia
20	MF	Meshari Barak	26 January 1981 (aged 21)	(Kuwait Football Association) Al-Sahel
21	GK	Saleh Mahdi	9 July 1981 (aged 21)	(Kuwait Football Association) Al-Salmiya
22	GK	Nawaf Al-Khaldi	25 May 1981 (aged 21)	(Kuwait Football Association) Al-Qadsia

=== North Korea ===
Coach: Ri Jong-man

No.	Pos.	Player	Date of birth (age)	Club
1	GK	Jon Tae-yong	1 October 1982 (aged 19)	
2	MF	Ri Chong-il	29 September 1982 (aged 20)	
3	MF	Ri Han-jae	27 June 1982 (aged 20)	(Japan Football Association) Sanfrecce Hiroshima
4	DF	Ri Pyong-sam		
5	DF	Ri Man-chol	19 June 1978 (aged 24)	
6	MF	Rim Kun-u	11 February 1981 (aged 21)	
7	MF	An Myong-nam		
8	FW	Kim Yong-su	21 December 1979 (aged 22)	
9	MF	Jon Yong-chol	18 July 1974 (aged 28)	
10	MF	Jon Chol	12 April 1982 (aged 20)	
11	MF	Han Jong-myong		
12	MF	Ri Kyong-in	10 November 1979 (aged 22)	
13	DF	Pak Yong-chol	16 May 1981 (aged 21)	
14	MF	Han Song-chol	10 July 1977 (aged 25)	
15	MF	Kim Yong-jun	19 July 1983 (aged 19)	(DPR Korea Football Association) Pyongyang
16	DF	So Hyok-chol	19 February 1982 (aged 20)	
17	FW	Pak Song-gwan	14 August 1980 (aged 22)	
18	GK	Jang Jong-hyok	26 August 1980 (aged 22)	
19	FW	Hong Yong-jo	22 May 1982 (aged 20)	(DPR Korea Football Association) April 25
20	DF	Choe Hyon-u	4 November 1983 (aged 18)	

=== Pakistan ===
Coach: (Slovakia) Joseph Herel

No.	Pos.	Player	Date of birth (age)	Club
1	GK	Jaffar Khan	20 March 1981 (aged 21)	(Pakistan Football Federation) Army
2	DF	Ashfaq Ahmed	3 January 1983 (aged 19)	(Pakistan Football Federation) ABL
3	DF	Amir Shahzad	7 February 1982 (aged 20)	(Pakistan Football Federation) Army
4	DF	Tanveer Ahmed	15 April 1976 (aged 26)	(Pakistan Football Federation) WAPDA
5	DF	Naseer Ahmed	12 April 1978 (aged 24)	(Pakistan Football Federation) KPT
6	MF	Mehmood Khan	6 January 1983 (aged 19)	(Pakistan Football Federation) Baloch
7	FW	Gohar Zaman	15 December 1979 (aged 22)	(Pakistan Football Federation) ABL
8	MF	Adeel Ahmed	25 November 1983 (aged 18)	(Pakistan Football Federation) PTCL
9	FW	Zulfiqar Ali Shah	25 November 1980 (aged 21)	(Pakistan Football Federation) ABL
10	MF	Muhammad Essa	20 November 1983 (aged 18)	(Pakistan Football Federation) PTCL
11	FW	Attique-ur-Rehman	5 May 1984 (aged 18)	(Pakistan Football Federation) KRL
13	FW	Zaheer Abbas		(Pakistan Football Federation) WAPDA
15	DF	Haroon Yousaf	10 November 1973 (aged 28)	(Pakistan Football Federation) ABL
16	MF	Nomi Martin Gill	9 September 1983 (aged 19)	(Pakistan Football Federation) Navy
17	MF	Arif Mehmood	26 June 1983 (aged 19)	(Pakistan Football Federation) Army
19	GK	Asad Ullah Tariq		(Pakistan Football Federation) WAPDA
20	GK	Muhammad Shahzad	25 August 1983 (aged 19)	(Pakistan Football Federation) HBL
