= Football at the 2002 Asian Games – Men's tournament =

Men's Football Tournament at the 2002 Asian Games
Tournament details
- Host country: South Korea
- Dates: 27 September – 13 October
- Teams: 24 (from 1 confederation)
- Venues: 6 (in 4 host cities)

Final positions
- Champions: Iran (1st title)
- Runners-up: Japan
- Third place: South Korea
- Fourth place: Thailand

Tournament statistics
- Matches played: 50
- Goals scored: 154 (3.08 per match)
- Top scorer(s): (Iran) Alireza Vahedi Nikbakht (5) (Japan) Satoshi Nakayama (5)

The men's football tournament at the 2002 Asian Games was held from 27 September to Saturday 13 October 2002 in Busan, South Korea.

== Venues ==
Busan		Ulsan
Asiad Main Stadium	Gudeok Stadium	Munsu Football Stadium
Capacity: 53,769	Capacity: 12,349	Capacity: 44,102
Changwon		Yangsan
Changwon Stadium	Masan Stadium	Yangsan Stadium
Capacity: 27,085	Capacity: 21,484	Capacity: 22,061

== Results ==
All times are Korea Standard Time (UTC+09:00)

=== Preliminary round ===
==== Group A ====
Pos	Team	Pld	W	D	L	GF	GA	GD	Pts
1	South Korea	3	3	0	0	13	2	+11	9
2	Oman	3	2	0	1	8	5	+3	6
3	Malaysia	3	1	0	2	3	6	−3	3
4	Maldives	3	0	0	3	1	12	−11	0

Source: RSSSF
27 September
19:03

Maldives	0–4	South Korea
		Choi Tae-uk 5'; As. Abdul Ghanee 45' (o.g.); Lee Dong-gook 59'; S. Mohamed 89' (o.g.)

Gudeok Stadium, Busan

27 September
19:03

Malaysia	0–1	Oman
		Al-Siyabi 63'

Masan Stadium, Changwon

30 September
19:03

Malaysia	3–1	Maldives
Jamlus 30', 32', 46'		Fazeel 79'

Gudeok Stadium, Busan

30 September
19:03

South Korea	5–2	Oman
Cho Sung-hwan 24'; Kim Do-heon 49'; Lee Dong-gook 60'; Lee Chun-soo 65', 85'		Saleh 50'; Shaaban 76'

Yangsan Stadium, Yangsan

3 October
19:03

South Korea	4–0	Malaysia
Kim Eun-jung 20', 72'; Choi Tae-uk 36'; Lee Dong-gook 90'

Masan Stadium, Changwon

3 October
19:03

Oman	5–0	Maldives
Ashoor 37'; Bashir 39'; Saleh 76', 88'; Ayil 79'

Munsu Football Stadium, Ulsan

==== Group B ====
Pos	Team	Pld	W	D	L	GF	GA	GD	Pts
1	Thailand	3	3	0	0	9	1	+8	9
2	United Arab Emirates	3	1	1	1	3	4	−1	4
3	Yemen	3	1	0	2	3	5	−2	3
4	Vietnam	3	0	1	2	0	5	−5	1

Source: RSSSF
27 September
16:33

United Arab Emirates	0–0	Vietnam

Munsu Football Stadium, Ulsan

27 September
16:33

Yemen	0–3	Thailand
		Kiatisuk 41'; Narongchai 58'; Manit 65'

Masan Stadium, Changwon

30 September
16:33

Vietnam	0–3	Thailand
		Narongchai 29'; Issawa 62'; Kiatisuk 83'

Masan Stadium, Changwon

30 September
16:33

Yemen	1–2	United Arab Emirates
Al-Salimi 59'		Khater 6'; Saad 32'

Gudeok Stadium, Busan

3 October
16:33

Thailand	3–1	United Arab Emirates
Manit 30'; Kiatisuk 36'; Narongchai 68'		Hassan 43'

Gudeok Stadium, Busan

3 October
16:33

Vietnam	0–2	Yemen
		Al-Shehri 44'; Al-Salimi 45+1'

Masan Stadium, Changwon

==== Group C ====
Pos	Team	Pld	W	D	L	GF	GA	GD	Pts
1	China	3	3	0	0	9	0	+9	9
2	India	3	2	0	1	6	3	+3	6
3	Turkmenistan	3	1	0	2	4	8	−4	3
4	Bangladesh	3	0	0	3	1	9	−8	0

Source: RSSSF
27 September
16:33

Turkmenistan	0–4	China
		Xu Liang 13'; Yan Song 37'; Wang Sheng 57'; Sun Xiang 80'

Gudeok Stadium, Busan

27 September
19:03

India	3–0	Bangladesh
Bhutia 46', 65'; R. Singh 66'

Munsu Football Stadium, Ulsan

30 September
16:33

Turkmenistan	1–3	India
W. Baýramow 21'		Bhutia 53', 77'; Yadav 56'

Yangsan Stadium, Yangsan

30 September
19:03

Bangladesh	0–3	China
		Wang Xinxin 35'; Yu Tao 45'; Gao Ming 87'

Masan Stadium, Changwon

3 October
19:03

China	2–0	India
Yu Tao 16', 45+1'

Yangsan Stadium, Yangsan

3 October
19:03

Bangladesh	1–3	Turkmenistan
Sujan 35'		Urazow 21', 42'; Nazarow 38'

Gudeok Stadium, Busan

==== Group D ====
Pos	Team	Pld	W	D	L	GF	GA	GD	Pts
1	Japan	3	3	0	0	8	2	+6	9
2	Bahrain	3	2	0	1	10	5	+5	6
3	Uzbekistan	3	1	0	2	2	4	−2	3
4	Palestine	3	0	0	3	0	9	−9	0

Source: RSSSF
28 September
16:33

Palestine	0–2	Japan
		T. Tanaka 67'; Nemoto 80'

Yangsan Stadium, Yangsan

28 September
16:33

Uzbekistan	0–3	Bahrain
		Jalal 14'; H. Ali 34'; Taleb 53'

Changwon Stadium, Changwon

1 October
16:33

Uzbekistan	2–0	Palestine
Bayramov 31'; Haydarov 45+1'

Yangsan Stadium, Yangsan

1 October
19:03

Japan	5–2	Bahrain
Okubo 16', 40'; Nakayama 19'; Matsui 26'; T. Tanaka 89'		R. Al-Dosari 50'; Isa 53'

Munsu Football Stadium, Ulsan

5 October
19:03

Bahrain	5–0	Palestine
H. Ali 5'; Taleb 9', 58'; Husain 15'; R. Al-Dosari 37'

Changwon Stadium, Changwon

5 October
19:03

Japan	1–0	Uzbekistan
Nakayama 39' (pen.)

Masan Stadium, Changwon

==== Group E ====
Pos	Team	Pld	W	D	L	GF	GA	GD	Pts
1	Iran	3	2	1	0	13	1	+12	7
2	Qatar	3	1	2	0	13	2	+11	5
3	Lebanon	3	1	1	1	12	3	+9	4
4	Afghanistan	3	0	0	3	0	32	−32	0

Source: RSSSF
28 September
16:33

Afghanistan	0–10	Iran
		Vahedi 11', 32', 51', 52', 85'; Nekounam 36', 65'; Golmohammadi 60'; Daei 88', 90'

Gudeok Stadium, Busan

28 September
19:03

Qatar	1–1	Lebanon
Gholam 26'		Al-Jamal 87'

Yangsan Stadium, Yangsan

1 October
16:33

Qatar	11–0	Afghanistan
Bechir 26', 28', 43', 69'; Gholam 31'; Abdulrahman 34', 75'; Al-Khater 51'; Sag. Al-Shammari 65'; Hamzah 74'; Rizik 77'

Munsu Football Stadium, Ulsan

1 October
16:33

Iran	2–0	Lebanon
Daei 54' (pen.); Kazemian 61'

Changwon Stadium, Changwon

5 October
16:33

Lebanon	11–0	Afghanistan
Kassas 8', 16', 80'; Al-Jamal 33', 45'; Hijazi 35'; Ghosn 53', 61', 90'; Atwi 74'; Zein 87'

Changwon Stadium, Changwon

5 October
16:33

Iran	1–1	Qatar
Badavi 34'		Al-Ghanim 32'

Masan Stadium, Changwon

==== Group F ====
Pos	Team	Pld	W	D	L	GF	GA	GD	Pts
1	Kuwait	3	3	0	0	9	0	+9	9
2	North Korea	3	2	0	1	7	3	+4	6
3	Hong Kong	3	1	0	2	4	3	+1	3
4	Pakistan	3	0	0	3	0	14	−14	0

Source: RSSSF
28 September
19:03

Hong Kong	1–2	North Korea
Poon Yiu Cheuk 66'		Han Song-chol 59'; Hong Yong-jo 82'

Changwon Stadium, Changwon

28 September
19:03

Kuwait	6–0	Pakistan
Abdullah 2', 54', 76'; Abdulqoddus 26'; Nahar 42'; Al-Tayyar 65'

Gudeok Stadium, Busan

1 October
19:03

Kuwait	1–0	Hong Kong
Ali 12'

Changwon Stadium, Changwon

1 October
19:03

North Korea	5–0	Pakistan
Jon Chol 12', 72'; Rim Kun-u 68'; Kim Yong-su 71', 85'

Yangsan Stadium, Yangsan

5 October
19:03

Pakistan	0–3	Hong Kong
		Chan Yiu Lun 49'; Lo Chi Kwan 78'; Law Chun Bong 90'

Yangsan Stadium, Yangsan

5 October
19:03

North Korea	0–2	Kuwait
		Al-Salamah 25'; Abdullah 26'

Munsu Football Stadium, Ulsan

==== Second-placed teams ====
Pos	Team	Pld	W	D	L	GF	GA	GD	Pts
1	Bahrain	3	2	0	1	10	5	+5	6
2	North Korea	3	2	0	1	7	3	+4	6
3	Oman	3	2	0	1	8	5	+3	6
4	India	3	2	0	1	6	3	+3	6
5	Qatar	3	1	2	0	13	2	+11	5
6	United Arab Emirates	3	1	1	1	3	4	−1	4

Source: RSSSF

=== Knockout round ===
Quarterfinals
8 October
China	0
Japan	1
8 October
Thailand	1
North Korea	0
8 October
Iran	1
Kuwait	0
8 October
South Korea	1
Bahrain	0

Semifinals
10 October
Japan	3
Thailand	0
10 October
Iran (p)	0 (5)
South Korea	0 (3)

Gold medal match
13 October
Japan	1
Iran	2
Bronze medal match
13 October
Thailand	0
South Korea	3

==== Quarterfinals ====
8 October
19:03

China	0–1	Japan
		Nakayama 60'

Masan Stadium, Changwon

8 October
19:03

Iran	1–0	Kuwait
Mobali 71'

Yangsan Stadium, Yangsan

8 October
19:03

South Korea	1–0	Bahrain
Lee Dong-gook 38' (pen.)

Munsu Football Stadium, Ulsan

8 October
19:03

Thailand	1–0	North Korea
Manit 52'

Gudeok Stadium, Busan

==== Semifinals ====
10 October
18:33

Japan	3–0	Thailand
Ikeda 23'; Suzuki 47'; Nakayama 84'

Munsu Football Stadium, Ulsan

10 October
20:03

Iran	0–0 (a.e.t.)	South Korea
Penalties
Nekounam (penalty scored); Kaebi (penalty scored); Nosrati (penalty scored); Mobali (penalty scored); Golmohammadi (penalty scored)	5–3	(penalty scored) Lee Dong-gook; (penalty missed) Lee Young-pyo; (penalty scored) Choi Tae-uk; (penalty scored) Park Ji-sung

Gudeok Stadium, Busan

==== Bronze medal match ====
13 October
16:03

Thailand	0–3	South Korea
		Park Dong-hyuk 15'; Lee Chun-soo 73'; Choi Tae-uk 74'

Munsu Football Stadium, Ulsan

==== Gold medal match ====
13 October
19:03

Japan	1–2	Iran
Nakayama 88'	Report	Kazemian 47'; Bayatinia 87'

Asiad Main Stadium, Busan

== Goalscorers ==
5 goals

- Alireza Vahedi Nikbakht (IRI)
- Satoshi Nakayama (JPN)

4 goals

- Bhaichung Bhutia (IND)
- Lee Dong-gook (KOR)
- Bashar Abdullah (KUW)
- Sayed Ali Bechir (QAT)

3 goals

- Ahmed Hassan Taleb (BRN)
- Yu Tao (CHN)
- Ali Daei (IRI)
- Choi Tae-uk (KOR)
- Lee Chun-soo (KOR)
- Nasrat Al-Jamal (LIB)
- Fadi Ghosn (LIB)
- Mohammad Kassas (LIB)
- Muhamad Khalid Jamlus (MAS)
- Hashim Saleh (OMA)
- Manit Noywech (THA)
- Kiatisuk Senamuang (THA)
- Narongchai Vachiraban (THA)

2 goals

- Rashid Al-Dosari (BRN)
- Husain Ali (BRN)
- Javad Kazemian (IRI)
- Javad Nekounam (IRI)
- Yoshito Okubo (JPN)
- Tatsuya Tanaka (JPN)
- Kim Eun-jung (KOR)
- Jon Chol (PRK)
- Kim Yong-su (PRK)
- Bilal Abdulrahman (QAT)
- Mohammed Gholam (QAT)
- Didargylyç Urazow (TKM)
- Adel Al-Salimi (YEM)

1 goal

- Mohammed Sujan (BAN)
- Mohamed Husain (BRN)
- Salman Isa (BRN)
- Sayed Mahmood Jalal (BRN)
- Gao Ming (CHN)
- Sun Xiang (CHN)
- Wang Sheng (CHN)
- Wang Xinxin (CHN)
- Xu Liang (CHN)
- Yan Song (CHN)
- Chan Yiu Lun (HKG)
- Law Chun Bong (HKG)
- Lo Chi Kwan (HKG)
- Poon Yiu Cheuk (HKG)
- Renedy Singh (IND)
- Abhishek Yadav (IND)
- Ali Badavi (IRI)
- Mohsen Bayatinia (IRI)
- Yahya Golmohammadi (IRI)
- Iman Mobali (IRI)
- Shohei Ikeda (JPN)
- Daisuke Matsui (JPN)
- Yuichi Nemoto (JPN)
- Keita Suzuki (JPN)
- Cho Sung-hwan (KOR)
- Kim Do-heon (KOR)
- Park Dong-hyuk (KOR)
- Khaled Abdulqoddus (KUW)
- Khalaf Al-Salamah (KUW)
- Hamad Al-Tayyar (KUW)
- Waleed Ali (KUW)
- Abdullah Nahar (KUW)
- Abbas Atwi (LIB)
- Fouad Hijazi (LIB)
- Haitham Zein (LIB)
- Ibrahim Fazeel (MDV)
- Taqi Mubarak Al-Siyabi (OMA)
- Nabil Ashoor (OMA)
- Munir Ayil (OMA)
- Fawzi Bashir (OMA)
- Yousuf Shaaban (OMA)
- Han Song-chol (PRK)
- Hong Yong-jo (PRK)
- Rim Kun-u (PRK)
- Ibrahim Al-Ghanim (QAT)
- Fawaz Al-Khater (QAT)
- Saghayer Al-Shammari (QAT)
- Waleed Hamzah (QAT)
- Wesam Rizik (QAT)
- Issawa Singthong (THA)
- Wladimir Baýramow (TKM)
- Artýom Nazarow (TKM)
- Faisal Ali Hassan (UAE)
- Subait Khater (UAE)
- Salem Saad (UAE)
- Renat Bayramov (UZB)
- Bahromjon Haydarov (UZB)
- Saleh Al-Shehri (YEM)

1 own goal

- Assad Abdul Ghanee (MDV) (against KOR)
- Sabah Mohamed (MDV) (against KOR)

== Final standing ==
Rank	Team	Pld	W	D	L	GF	GA	GD	Pts
1st place, gold medalist(s)	Iran	6	4	2	0	16	2	+14	14
2nd place, silver medalist(s)	Japan	6	5	0	1	13	4	+9	15
3rd place, bronze medalist(s)	South Korea	6	5	1	0	17	2	+15	16
4	Thailand	6	4	0	2	10	7	+3	12
5	China	4	3	0	1	9	1	+8	9
5	Kuwait	4	3	0	1	9	1	+8	9
7	Bahrain	4	2	0	2	10	6	+4	6
8	North Korea	4	2	0	2	7	4	+3	6
9	Oman	3	2	0	1	8	5	+3	6
10	India	3	2	0	1	6	3	+3	6
11	Qatar	3	1	2	0	13	2	+11	5
12	Lebanon	3	1	1	1	12	3	+9	4
13	United Arab Emirates	3	1	1	1	3	4	−1	4
14	Hong Kong	3	1	0	2	4	3	+1	3
15	Yemen	3	1	0	2	3	5	−2	3
16	Uzbekistan	3	1	0	2	2	4	−2	3
17	Malaysia	3	1	0	2	3	6	−3	3
18	Turkmenistan	3	1	0	2	4	8	−4	3
19	Vietnam	3	0	1	2	0	5	−5	1
20	Bangladesh	3	0	0	3	1	9	−8	0
21	Palestine	3	0	0	3	0	9	−9	0
22	Maldives	3	0	0	3	1	12	−11	0
23	Pakistan	3	0	0	3	0	14	−14	0
24	Afghanistan	3	0	0	3	0	32	−32	0
