= 2002 Arab Cup squads =

List of football squads

== Group A ==
=== Jordan ===
- Head coach: (Egypt) Mahmoud El-Gohary

No.	Pos.	Player	Date of birth (age)	Caps	Goals	Club
	GK	Amer Shafi	14 February 1982 (aged 20)	9	0	(Jordan Football Association) Al-Yarmouk
	DF	Faisal Ibrahim	22 September 1976 (aged 26)	52	0	(Jordan Football Association) Al-Wehdat
	DF	Bashar Bani Yaseen	1 June 1977 (aged 25)	21	0	(Jordan Football Association) Al-Hussein
	DF	Hatem Aqel	20 June 1978 (aged 24)	41	0	(Jordan Football Association) Al-Faisaly
	DF	Khaled Saad	14 November 1981 (aged 21)	10	0	(Jordan Football Association) Al-Faisaly
	MF	Haitham Al-Shboul	13 November 1974 (aged 28)	57	3	(Jordan Football Association) Al-Faisaly
	MF	Abdullah Abu Zema	4 April 1976 (aged 26)	59	11	(Jordan Football Association) Al-Wehdat
	MF	Sama'an Halsa	5 March 1982 (aged 20)	4	3	(Jordan Football Association) Al-Faisaly
	MF	Rafat Ali Jaber	18 December 1975 (aged 26)	48	3	(Jordan Football Association) Al-Wehdat
	MF	Amer Deeb	4 February 1980 (aged 22)	9	1	(Jordan Football Association) Al-Wehdat
	MF	Essam Abu Touk	19 September 1977 (aged 25)	12	5	(Jordan Football Association) Al-Qadisiyah
	FW	Hassouneh Al-Sheikh	26 January 1977 (aged 25)	47	6	(Jordan Football Association) Al-Faisaly
	FW	Moayad Salim Mansour	1 April 1976 (aged 26)	34	7	(Jordan Football Association) Al-Faisaly
	FW	Sufian Abdullah	6 February 1975 (aged 27)	32	2	(Jordan Football Association) Al-Wehdat
	FW	Anas Al-Zboun	5 April 1979 (aged 23)	10	3	(Jordan Football Association) Al-Hussein

=== Kuwait ===
- Head coach: (Federal Republic of Yugoslavia) Radojko Avramović

No.	Pos.	Player	Date of birth (age)	Caps	Goals	Club
	GK	Nawaf Al-Khaldi	25 May 1981 (aged 21)	6	0	(Kuwait Football Association) Al-Qadsia
	DF	Nohayer Mohsen Al-Shammari	12 July 1976 (aged 26)	50	3	(Kuwait Football Association) Al-Qadsia
	DF	Musaed Neda	8 July 1983 (aged 19)	0	0	(Kuwait Football Association) Al-Qadsia
	DF	Youssef Zayed	2 September 1979 (aged 23)	2	0	(Kuwait Football Association) Al-Fahaheel
	DF	Esam Sakeen	2 July 1971 (aged 31)	63	4	(Kuwait Football Association) Kazma
	DF	Ali Abdulridha		0	0	(Kuwait Football Association)
	DF	Ibrahim Sikkeen		1	0	(Kuwait Football Association)
	MF	Hamad Al-Tayyar	10 February 1982 (aged 20)	8	0	(Kuwait Football Association) Kazma
	MF	Saleh Al-Buraiki	27 February 1977 (aged 25)	34	2	(Kuwait Football Association) Al-Salmiya
	MF	Waleed Ali	3 November 1980 (aged 22)	2	0	(Kuwait Football Association) Khaitan
	MF	Abdullah Wabran	7 February 1971 (aged 31)	48	7	(Kuwait Football Association) Al-Tadamon
	MF	Mohammed Ghulam Ashkanani	25 July 1981 (aged 21)	0	0	(Kuwait Football Association) Al-Arabi
	MF	Mohammed Jarragh	10 November 1981 (aged 21)	14	0	(Kuwait Football Association) Al-Arabi
	MF	Adel Oukla Al-Enezi	6 February 1977 (aged 25)	0	0	(Kuwait Football Association) Al-Kuwait
	FW	Faraj Laheeb	3 October 1978 (aged 24)	31	15	(Kuwait Football Association) Al-Kuwait
	FW	Bashar Abdullah	12 October 1977 (aged 25)	67	48	(United Arab Emirates Football Association) Al Ain
	FW	Ali Fadhel		0	0	(Kuwait Football Association) Al-Salmiya
	FW	Abdullah Nahar	31 March 1981 (aged 21)	0	0	(Kuwait Football Association) Al-Fahaheel
	FW	Ahmad Al Beloushi	11 April 1981 (aged 21)	1	0	(Kuwait Football Association) Al-Qadsia

=== Morocco U23 ===
No.	Pos.	Player	Date of birth (age)	Caps	Goals	Club
	GK	Tarik El Jarmouni	30 December 1977 (aged 24)	0	0	(Royal Moroccan Football Federation) Wydad
	DF	Mourad Fellah	8 June 1978 (aged 24)	1	0	(Royal Moroccan Football Federation) Maghreb of Fez
	DF	Yazid Al-Qaissi		0	0	(Royal Moroccan Football Federation)
	DF	Oussama Al-Suwaidi		0	0	(Royal Moroccan Football Federation)
	DF	Moustapha Talha		0	0	(Royal Moroccan Football Federation)
	DF	Othman Noayna’a		0	0	(Royal Moroccan Football Federation)
	DF	Amin Al-Rabati		0	0	(Royal Moroccan Football Federation)
	MF	Morad Al-Rafiyi		0	0	(Royal Moroccan Football Federation)
	MF	Mohamed Armoumen	19 September 1979 (aged 23)	1	0	(Qatar Football Association) Al-Arabi
	MF	Boushaib Lembarki		0	0	(Royal Moroccan Football Federation)
	MF	Jalal Al-Qalayi		0	0	(Royal Moroccan Football Federation)
	MF	Younes Razzouq		0	0	(Royal Moroccan Football Federation)
	FW	Saeed Kharazi		0	0	(Royal Moroccan Football Federation)
	FW	Mohamed Al-Wardi		0	0	(Royal Moroccan Football Federation)
	FW	Mounir Mowahil		0	0	(Royal Moroccan Football Federation)
	FW	Hisham Abou-Sharwan		0	0	(Royal Moroccan Football Federation)

=== Palestine ===
- Head coach: (Poland) Andrzej Wiśniewski

No.	Pos.	Player	Date of birth (age)	Caps	Goals	Club
	GK	Ramzi Saleh	8 August 1980 (aged 22)	12	0	(Palestinian Football Association) Shabab Jabalia
	DF	Saeb Jundeya	13 May 1975 (aged 27)	18	0	(Jordan Football Association) Al-Hussein SC
	DF	Hamada Eshbair	9 September 1980 (aged 22)	12	0	(Palestinian Football Association)
	DF	Francisco Alam Atura	1 August 1979 (aged 23)	0	0	(Football Federation of Chile) Unión La Calera
	DF	Roberto Bishara	18 August 1981 (aged 21)	0	0	(Football Federation of Chile) Palestino
	DF	Hazem Mohtasib	2 September 1979 (aged 23)	0	0	(Palestinian Football Association) Shabab Al-Khaleel
	MF	Jamal Al-Houli	21 February 1975 (aged 27)	10	1	(Palestinian Football Association) Shabab Rafah
	MF	Edgardo Abdala	1 July 1978 (aged 24)	0	0	(Football Federation of Chile) Fernández Vial
	MF	Roberto Kettlun	21 July 1981 (aged 21)	0	0	(Football Federation of Chile) Palestino
	MF	Pablo Abdala	6 May 1972 (aged 30)	0	0	(Football Federation of Chile) Cobreloa
	MF	Ibrahim Al-Suwairki	13 June 1979 (aged 23)	13	0	(Palestinian Football Association) Al-Ittihad Shuja’iyya
	MF	Mohammed Hasanain	8 February 1975 (aged 27)	4	0	(Palestinian Football Association)
	MF	Shaker Asad	18 August 1979 (aged 23)	0	0	(United States Soccer Federation) New England Revolution
	MF	Mohammed Al-Jaish	6 July 1971 (aged 31)	15	4	(Jordan Football Association) Al-Jazeera
	FW	Rami Al-Rabi		1	0	(Palestinian Football Association)
	FW	Ziyad Al-Kord	15 January 1974 (aged 28)	11	3	(Jordan Football Association) Al-Wehdat
	FW	Fady Lafi Abu Latifa	23 March 1979 (aged 23)	18	5	(Jordan Football Association) Al-Faisaly
	FW	Emad Abou El-Kair	7 February 1980 (aged 22)	5	4	(Egyptian Football Association) Goldi
	FW	Taysir Amer	26 January 1977 (aged 25)	0	0	(Palestinian Football Association) Al-Ahli Qalqilya

=== Sudan ===
- Head coach: (Poland) Wojciech Łazarek

No.	Pos.	Player	Date of birth (age)	Caps	Goals	Club
	GK	Al-Muez Mahjoub	14 August 1978 (aged 24)	6	0	(Sudan Football Association) Al Hilal
	GK	Ammar Makki		2	0	(Sudan Football Association) Al Merrikh
	DF	Alaaeldin Jebril Katoul	7 December 1978 (aged 24)	5	0	(Sudan Football Association) Hay Al-Arab
	DF	Richard Justin Lado	7 December 1978 (aged 24)	24	4	(Sudan Football Association) Al Hilal
	DF	Abdel Elah Bushra	4 March 1974 (aged 28)	11	0	(Sudan Football Association) Al Merrikh
	DF	Mamoun Zolo	3 May 1980 (aged 22)	2	0	(Sudan Football Association) Al Merrikh
	DF	Saleh Senar	11 March 1983 (aged 19)	2	0	(Sudan Football Association) Al Hilal
	DF	Abdel Azim Juda		3	0	(Sudan Football Association) Al-Taka Kassala
	DF	Salah Alyas	12 July 1977 (aged 25)	0	0	(Sudan Football Association) Al Merrikh
	DF	Muhamed Bastawi	13 August 1975 (aged 27)	16	0	(Sudan Football Association) Al Hilal
	MF	Musadag Alwan		0	0	(Sudan Football Association) Al Ittihad
	MF	Bakri Makin		2	0	(Sudan Football Association) Al Merrikh
	MF	Muhamed Ali Osman		0	0	(Sudan Football Association) Hay Al-Arab
	MF	Haitham Mustafa	19 July 1977 (aged 25)	20	0	(Sudan Football Association) Al Hilal
	MF	Aalem Khamis	1 January 1976 (aged 26)	3	0	(Sudan Football Association) Al Ittihad
	FW	Ahmed Al-Sayed	12 July 1978 (aged 24)	0	0	(Sudan Football Association) Al Merrikh
	FW	Muataz Kabir	15 January 1980 (aged 22)	6	2	(Sudan Football Association) Al Hilal
	FW	Salah Al-Dai	12 June 1978 (aged 24)	7	0	(Sudan Football Association) Al Hilal
	FW	Al-Taj Oumokashi		1	0	(Sudan Football Association) Al Ahli

== Group B ==
=== Bahrain ===
- Head Coach: (Germany) Wolfgang Sidka

No.	Pos.	Player	Date of birth (age)	Caps	Goals	Club
	GK	Abdulrahman Abdulkarim	13 May 1980 (aged 22)	10	0	(Bahrain Football Association) Al-Hala
	GK	Ali Hassan Al-Thani	16 August 1972 (aged 30)	1	0	(Bahrain Football Association) Al-Muharraq
	DF	Mohamed Husain	18 July 1980 (aged 22)	35	4	(Saudi Arabian Football Federation) Al-Ahli
	DF	Abdulaziz Saleh Al-Dosari	18 July 1980 (aged 22)	13	0	(Bahrain Football Association) Busaiteen Club
	DF	Abdulla Al-Marzooqi	12 December 1980 (aged 22)	14	2	(Bahrain Football Association) Al-Riffa
	DF	Salman Isa	12 July 1977 (aged 25)	21	2	(Bahrain Football Association) Al-Riffa
	DF	Ghazi Al Kuwari	19 May 1977 (aged 25)	29	1	(Bahrain Football Association) East Riffa Club
	DF	Faisal Abdulaziz	8 October 1968 (aged 34)	27	1	(Bahrain Football Association) Al-Muharraq
	DF	Basil Sultan Karim	27 February 1982 (aged 20)	4	0	(Bahrain Football Association) Busaiteen Club
	MF	Mohamed Salmeen	4 November 1980 (aged 22)	29	5	(Bahrain Football Association) Al-Hala
	MF	Talal Yousef	24 February 1975 (aged 27)	27	5	(Bahrain Football Association) Al-Riffa
	MF	Ahmed Hassan Taleb	29 March 1980 (aged 22)	6	1	(Bahrain Football Association) Al-Riffa
	MF	Rashid Al-Dosari	24 March 1980 (aged 22)	27	2	(Bahrain Football Association) Al-Muharraq
	MF	Sayed Mahmood Jalal	5 November 1980 (aged 22)	14	0	(Bahrain Football Association) Al-Shabab Club
	MF	Rashid Abdulrahman	31 March 1973 (aged 29)	0	0	(Bahrain Football Association) Al-Muharraq
	MF	Khaled Abdullah Isa Al-Dosari	27 March 1972 (aged 30)	41	4	(Bahrain Football Association)
	MF	Hussain Salman	20 December 1982 (aged 19)	0	0	(Bahrain Football Association) Al-Shabab Club
	FW	Husain Ali	31 December 1981 (aged 20)	21	6	(Bahrain Football Association) Al-Muharraq
	FW	Duaij Naser	18 January 1983 (aged 19)	1	0	(Bahrain Football Association) Al-Hala

=== Lebanon ===
- Head coach: (France) Richard Tardy

No.	Pos.	Player	Date of birth (age)	Caps	Goals	Club
	GK	Ziad Al Samad	6 August 1978 (aged 24)	2	0	(Lebanese Football Association) Ansar
	GK	Nazih Tay	5 May 1977 (aged 25)	1	0	(Lebanese Football Association) Bourj
	DF	Agop Donabidian	21 October 1981 (aged 21)	7	0	(Lebanese Football Association) Homenetmen Beirut
	DF	Mohamad Halawi	5 April 1977 (aged 25)	12	1	(Lebanese Football Association) Nejmeh
	DF	Imad Al Miri	19 October 1977 (aged 25)	3	0	(Lebanese Football Association) Olympic Beirut
	DF	Youssef Mohamad	1 July 1980 (aged 22)	19	1	(Lebanese Football Association) Olympic Beirut
	DF	Ahmad El Naamani	12 October 1979 (aged 23)	25	0	(Lebanese Football Association) Safa
	MF	Faisal Antar	20 December 1978 (aged 23)	24	3	(Lebanese Football Association) Olympic Beirut
	MF	Roda Antar	12 September 1980 (aged 22)	26	9	(Lebanese Football Association) Tadamon Sour
	MF	Buddy Farah	18 August 1978 (aged 24)	5	0	(Football Australia) Wollongong Wolves
	MF	Bilal Hajo	1 February 1980 (aged 22)	3	0	(Lebanese Football Association) Tadamon Sour
	MF	Malek Hassoun	10 June 1975 (aged 27)	5	2	(Lebanese Football Association) Ansar
	MF	Moussa Hojeij	6 August 1974 (aged 28)	26	5	(Lebanese Football Association) Nejmeh
	MF	Fouad Hijazi	27 June 1973 (aged 29)	20	1	(Lebanese Football Association) Sagesse
	FW	Abbas Ali Atwi	15 December 1984 (aged 18)	1	0	(Lebanese Football Association) Olympic Beirut
	FW	Fadi Ghosson	15 May 1979 (aged 23)	3	0	(Lebanese Football Association) Ansar
	FW	Mohammad Kassas	1 July 1976 (aged 26)	6	1	(Lebanese Football Association) Olympic Beirut
	FW	Haitham Zein	6 January 1979 (aged 23)	26	14	(Lebanese Football Association) Tadamon Sour

=== Saudi Arabia ===
- Head Coach: (Netherlands) Gerard van der Lem

No.	Pos.	Player	Date of birth (age)	Caps	Goals	Club
1	GK	Mabrouk Zaid	11 February 1979 (aged 23)	5	0	(Saudi Arabian Football Federation) Al-Ittihad
2	DF	Hamad Al-Eissa	4 May 1982 (aged 20)	1	0	(Saudi Arabian Football Federation) Al-Ittihad
3	DF	Redha Tukar	29 November 1975 (aged 27)	10	0	(Saudi Arabian Football Federation) Al-Shabab
4	DF	Hamad Al-Montashari	22 June 1982 (aged 20)	4	0	(Saudi Arabian Football Federation) Al-Ittihad
6	MF	Omar Al-Ghamdi	11 April 1979 (aged 23)	34	0	(Saudi Arabian Football Federation) Al-Hilal
7	FW	Bandar Tamim	5 March 1982 (aged 20)	0	0	(Saudi Arabian Football Federation) Al-Nassr
8	MF	Mohammed Noor	26 February 1978 (aged 24)	42	0	(Saudi Arabian Football Federation) Al-Ittihad
9	FW	Yasser Al-Qahtani	10 October 1982 (aged 20)	0	0	(Saudi Arabian Football Federation) Al-Qadsiah
11	MF	Ahmed Al-Khair	14 July 1982 (aged 23)	0	0	(Saudi Arabian Football Federation) Al-Nassr
12	DF	Naser Al-Halawi	10 January 1979 (aged 23)	0	0	(Saudi Arabian Football Federation) Al-Nassr
13	DF	Saleh Al-Saqri	23 January 1979 (aged 23)	33	0	(Saudi Arabian Football Federation) Al-Ittihad
14	MF	Saud Kariri	8 July 1980 (aged 25)	5	0	(Saudi Arabian Football Federation) Al-Qadsiah
15	FW	Talal Al-Meshal	7 June 1978 (aged 24)	28	19	(Saudi Arabian Football Federation) Al-Ahli
16	MF	Abdulaziz Al-Janoubi	20 July 1974 (aged 28)	6	0	(Saudi Arabian Football Federation) Al-Nassr
17	FW	Abdullah Al-Waked	29 September 1975 (aged 27)	45	3	(Saudi Arabian Football Federation) Al-Ahli
18	MF	Mohammed Al-Faifi		1	0	(Saudi Arabian Football Federation) Al-Shabab
20	DF	Faisal Al-Obaili	8 February 1979 (aged 23)	2	0	(Saudi Arabian Football Federation) Al-Shabab
21	GK	Saeed Al-Harbi	28 August 1981 (aged 21)	0	0	(Saudi Arabian Football Federation) Al-Shabab

=== Syria ===
- Head coach: (Syria) Ahmad Al-Shaar

No.	Pos.	Player	Date of birth (age)	Caps	Goals	Club
	GK	Mohamed Bairouti	29 January 1976 (aged 26)	20	0	(Syrian Football Association) Al-Jaish
	DF	Tarek Jabban	11 December 1975 (aged 27)	27	5	(Syrian Football Association) Al-Jaish
	DF	Raafat Mohammad	6 July 1977 (aged 25)	4	0	(Syrian Football Association) Al-Wahda
	DF	Mohamed Azizi		0	0	(Syrian Football Association)
	DF	Feras Esmaeel	3 January 1983 (aged 19)	0	0	(Syrian Football Association) Al-Jaish
	DF	Ibrahim Aziziya Rida		1	0	(Syrian Football Association) Al-Ittihad Aleppo
	MF	Jomard Moussa	27 February 1979 (aged 23)	7	5	(Syrian Football Association) Al-Jaish
	MF	Maher Al-Sayed	13 March 1979 (aged 23)	14	4	(Syrian Football Association) Al-Jaish
	MF	Raghdan Shehadeh	1 January 1977 (aged 25)	18	3	(Syrian Football Association) Al-Jaish
	MF	Nihad Haj Moustafa	30 November 1978 (aged 24)	22	7	(Syrian Football Association) Al-Jaish
	MF	Iyad Abdul-Karim	1974	0	0	(Syrian Football Association) Al-Jaish
	MF	Mohamad Yehya Al-Rashed	1 February 1982 (aged 20)	1	0	(Syrian Football Association) Al-Jaish
	MF	Jehad Al-Hussain	30 July 1982 (aged 20)	1	1	(Syrian Football Association) Al-Karamah
	MF	Mahmoud Al-Amenah	25 January 1983 (aged 19)	0	0	(Syrian Football Association) Al-Hurriya
	MF	Moatassem Alaya	1983	0	0	(Syrian Football Association) Al-Wahda
	FW	Firas Al-Khatib	9 June 1983 (aged 19)	3	3	(Kuwait Football Association) Al Nasr
	FW	Raja Rafe	1 May 1983 (aged 19)	0	0	(Syrian Football Association) Al-Majd

=== Yemen ===
- Head coach: (Yemen) Abdullah Saqr Baamer

No.	Pos.	Player	Date of birth (age)	Caps	Goals	Club
	GK	Mua'adh Abdul Khalek	2 January 1972 (aged 30)	4	0	(Yemen Football Association) Ahli Sanaa
	GK	Salem Saeed	1 January 1984 (aged 18)	0	0	(Yemen Football Association) Hassan Abyan
	DF	Salem Saeed Ba Lhamar	2 May 1977 (aged 25)	16	0	(Yemen Football Association) Ahli Sanaa
	DF	Khaled Afarah	21 January 1974 (aged 28)	7	0	(Yemen Football Association) Al Tilal
	DF	Nashwan Abdulaziz Ali	23 October 1983 (aged 19)	3	0	(Yemen Football Association) Shaab Ibb
	DF	Anwar Al-Sarori	5 May 1982 (aged 20)	6	1	(Yemen Football Association)
	DF	Mohammed Saleh Salem Al-Zuraqi	4 May 1983 (aged 19)	0	0	(Yemen Football Association) Al Hilal Al Sahili
	DF	Ali Mohamed Joarah	17 December 1982 (aged 19)	1	0	(Yemen Football Association)
	MF	Ahmed Salem Al-Zuraqi	27 March 1979 (aged 23)	5	0	(Yemen Football Association) Al-Shaab Sanaa
	MF	Ridhwan Abdul Jabar Yahya	1 May 1984 (aged 18)	2	0	(Yemen Football Association) Shaab Ibb
	MF	Ali Awad Al-Omqi	2 July 1982 (aged 20)	5	1	(Yemen Football Association) Al-Shaab Hadramaut
	MF	Jamal Ahmed Al-Qadimi	6 December 1981 (aged 21)	3	0	(Yemen Football Association)
	MF	Khaled Al-Arumi	1 January 1984 (aged 18)	0	0	(Yemen Football Association) Al-Saqr
	MF	Essam Awn Al-Dhabani	3 January 1984 (aged 18)	0	0	(Yemen Football Association)
	MF	Nasser Ghazi	3 May 1981 (aged 21)	0	0	(Yemen Football Association) Al-Wehda
	MF	Qais Mohamed		0	0	(Yemen Football Association) Al Tilal
	FW	Adel Al-Salmi	6 July 1979 (aged 23)	10	8	(Yemen Football Association) Ahli Sanaa
	FW	Ali Al-Nono	7 June 1980 (aged 22)	9	8	(Yemen Football Association) Ahli Sanaa
	FW	Nashwan Al-Haggam	23 October 1983 (aged 19)	0	0	(Yemen Football Association) Shaab Ibb
