= Bilal Hachem =

Lebanese football player and coach

Personal information
- Date of birth: 19 July 1968 (age 58)
- Height: 1.86 m (6 ft 1 in)
- Position: Goalkeeper

Senior career*
Years	Team	Apps	(Gls)
1988–2001	Safa		
2001–2007	Ahed		

International career
1993–1997	Lebanon	12	(0)

Managerial career
- 2016: Lebanon U17 (goalkeeper)
- 2017: Lebanon U19 (goalkeeper)
- 2019: Lebanon beach soccer (goalkeeper)
- 2020: Ahed (goalkeeper)
- * Club domestic league appearances and goals

Bilal Hachem (Arabic: بلال هاشم; born 19 July 1968) is a Lebanese football coach and former player who is the goalkeeper coach of Lebanese Premier League club Ahed.

== Club career ==
After having spent many years at Safa, Hachem joined Ahed in 2001, playing for them at least until 2007. He also played futsal for them in 2008.

== Coaching career ==
Hachem was the goalkeeper coach of the Lebanon national under-17 team in 2016, the national under-19 team in 2017, the national beach soccer team at the 2019 AFC Beach Soccer Championship, and Ahed in 2020.

== Personal life ==
Hachem's brother, Yehia, also played football.

== See also ==
- List of association football families
