= Nguyễn Hoàng Vương =

Vietnamese footballer

Personal information
- Full name: Nguyễn Hoàng Vương
- Date of birth: 7 October 1981 (age 45)
- Place of birth: Hồng Ngự, Đồng Tháp, Vietnam
- Height: 1.65 m (5 ft 5 in)
- Position: Defender

Youth career
- 1993–2001: Đồng Tháp

Senior career*
| Years | Team | Apps | (Gls) |
| 2002–2004 | Dong A Bank | 37 | (4) |
| 2004–2011 | Becamex Bình Dương | 89 | (8) |
| 2011–2012 | Navibank Sài Gòn | 16 | (0) |

International career
| 2008–2010 | Vietnam | 1 | (0) |
- * Club domestic league appearances and goals

Nguyễn Hoàng Vương is a Vietnamese left-sided defender who plays for V-League club Navibank Sài Gòn. He made his debut for the Vietnam national football team in 2008.
