= Yangsan Stadium =

Sports venue in Yangsan, South Korea

Coordinates: 35°20′41″N 129°01′56″E

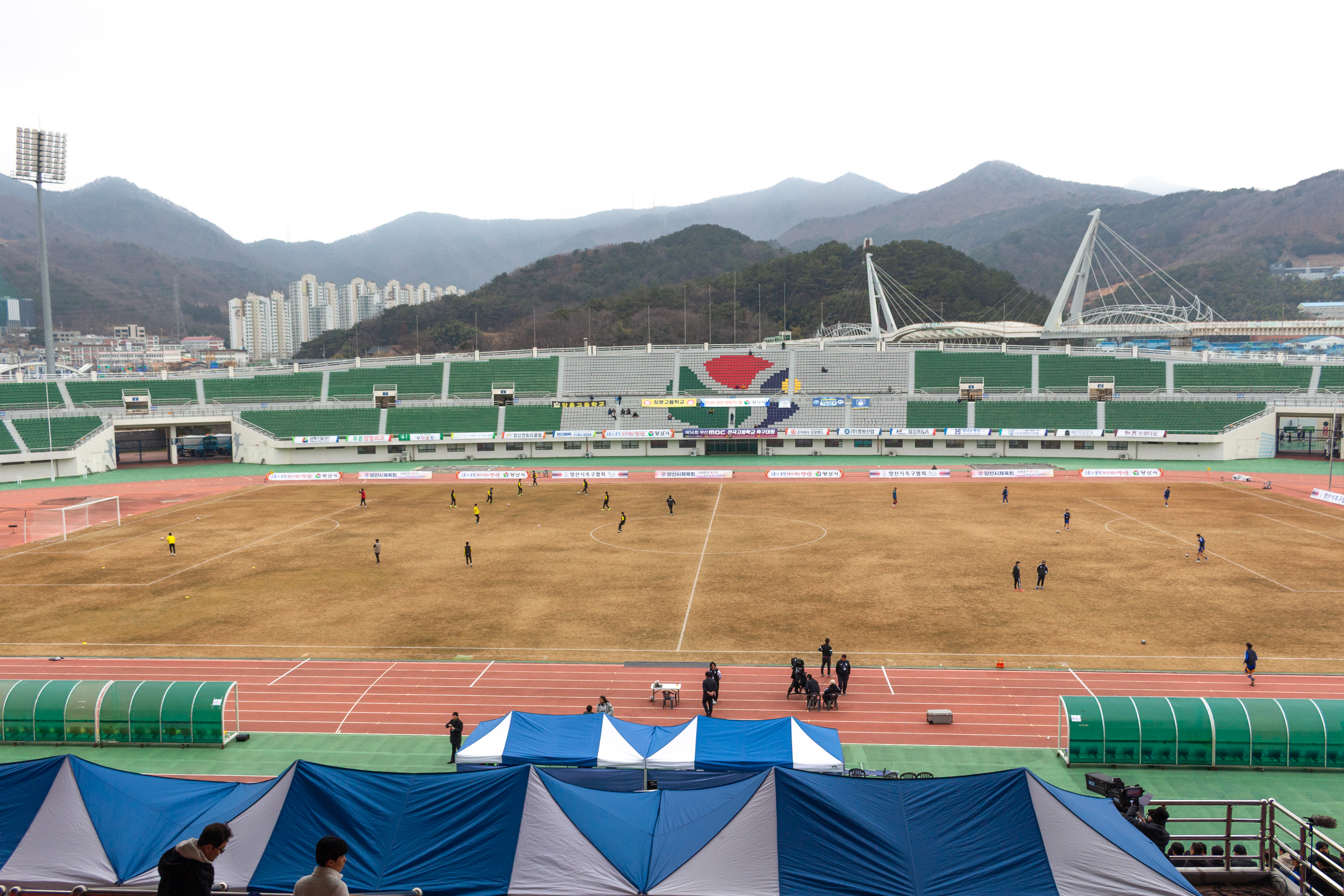
- Interactive map of Yangsan Stadium
- Full name: Yangsan Stadium
- Location: Yangsan, South Korea
- Capacity: 22,061 (all-seated)

Construction
- Opened: 2002

Yangsan Stadium is a stadium in Yangsan, South Korea. It is currently used mostly for football matches. The stadium holds 22,061 spectators and opened in 2002.
