= Fayez Jumaa =

Emirati footballer (born 1981)

Personal information
- Full name: Fayez Jumaa Khamis
- Date of birth: 12 February 1981 (age 45)
- Place of birth: United Arab Emirates
- Height: 1.75 m (5 ft 9 in)
- Position: Defender

Youth career
- Sharjah

Senior career*
Years	Team	Apps	(Gls)
2002–2017	Sharjah	54	(0)
2018	Al Arabi		

International career
2006–2008	United Arab Emirates	6	(1)
- * Club domestic league appearances and goals

Fayez Jumaa (Arabic:فايز جمعه) (born 12 February 1981) is an Emirati footballer. He currently plays as a defender .

== Club career ==
- 2014-15 Sharjah Cultural Sports Club: Tournament:Division 1, Games:8, Yellow cards:1
- 2015-16 Sharjah Cultural Sports Club: Tournament:Division 1, Games:20, Yellow cards:3
- 2016-17 Sharjah Cultural Sports Club: Tournament:Division 1, Games:12, Yellow cards:4, Red cards:1
