= Ahmad Al Beloushi =

Kuwaiti footballer

Personal information
- Full name: Ahmad Abdullah Kamshad Al Beloushi
- Date of birth: April 11, 1981 (age 45)
- Place of birth: Kuwait City, Kuwait
- Position: Forward

Youth career
- 1996–2001: Al Qadsia

Senior career*
Years	Team	Apps	(Gls)
2001–2011	Al Qadsia		
2011–2012	Al Yarmouk		

International career^{‡}
2002	Kuwait	3	(0)
- * Club domestic league appearances and goals as of January 19, 2011 ‡ National team caps and goals as of January 19, 2011

Ahmad Abdullah Kamshad Al Beloushi (Arabic: أحمد عبدالله كمشاد البلوشي, born 11 April 1981) is a Kuwaiti footballer who is a forward for the Kuwaiti Premier League club Al Yarmouk.
