= Masan Stadium =

Multi-purpose stadium in Changwon, South Korea

Masan Stadium 마산종합운동장
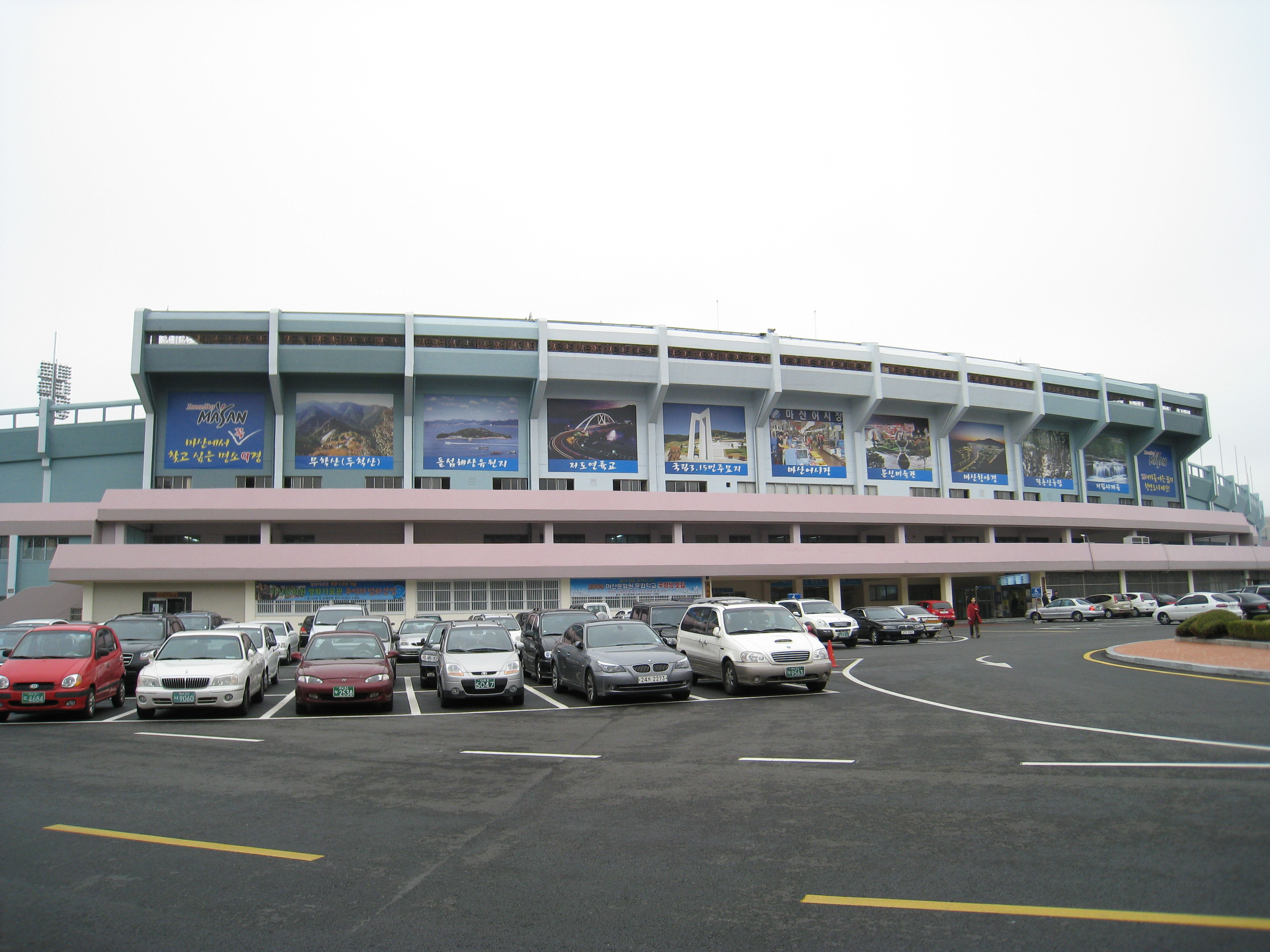
- Interactive map of Masan Stadium 마산종합운동장
- Location: Masanhoewon-gu, Changwon, Gyeongsangnam-do, South Korea
- Coordinates: 35.222475°N 128.581946°E
- Owner: Changwon
- Operator: Changwon
- Capacity: 21,484
- Surface: Natural grass, running track

Construction
- Opened: 1982

Tenant
- Daewoo Royals (K League) (1987–1988)

The Masan Stadium (Korean: 마산종합운동장) was a multi-purpose stadium in Changwon, South Korea. The stadium has a capacity of 21,484 people. The stadium opened in 1982 and has a gymnasium, indoor swimming pool, and tennis courts. It is currently used mostly for football matches.

The stadium was demolished in 2016.

== Gallery ==
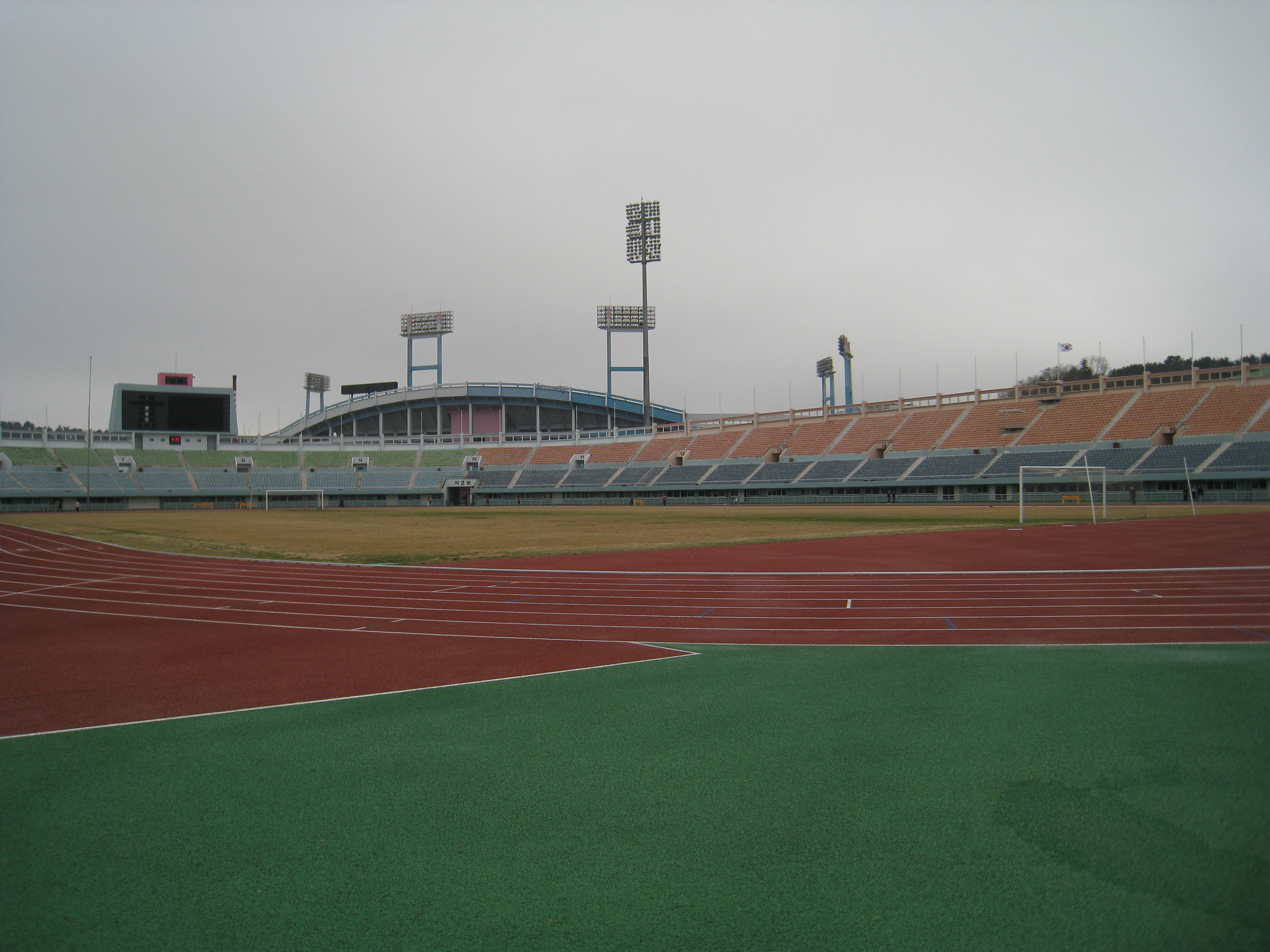
Masan Stadium

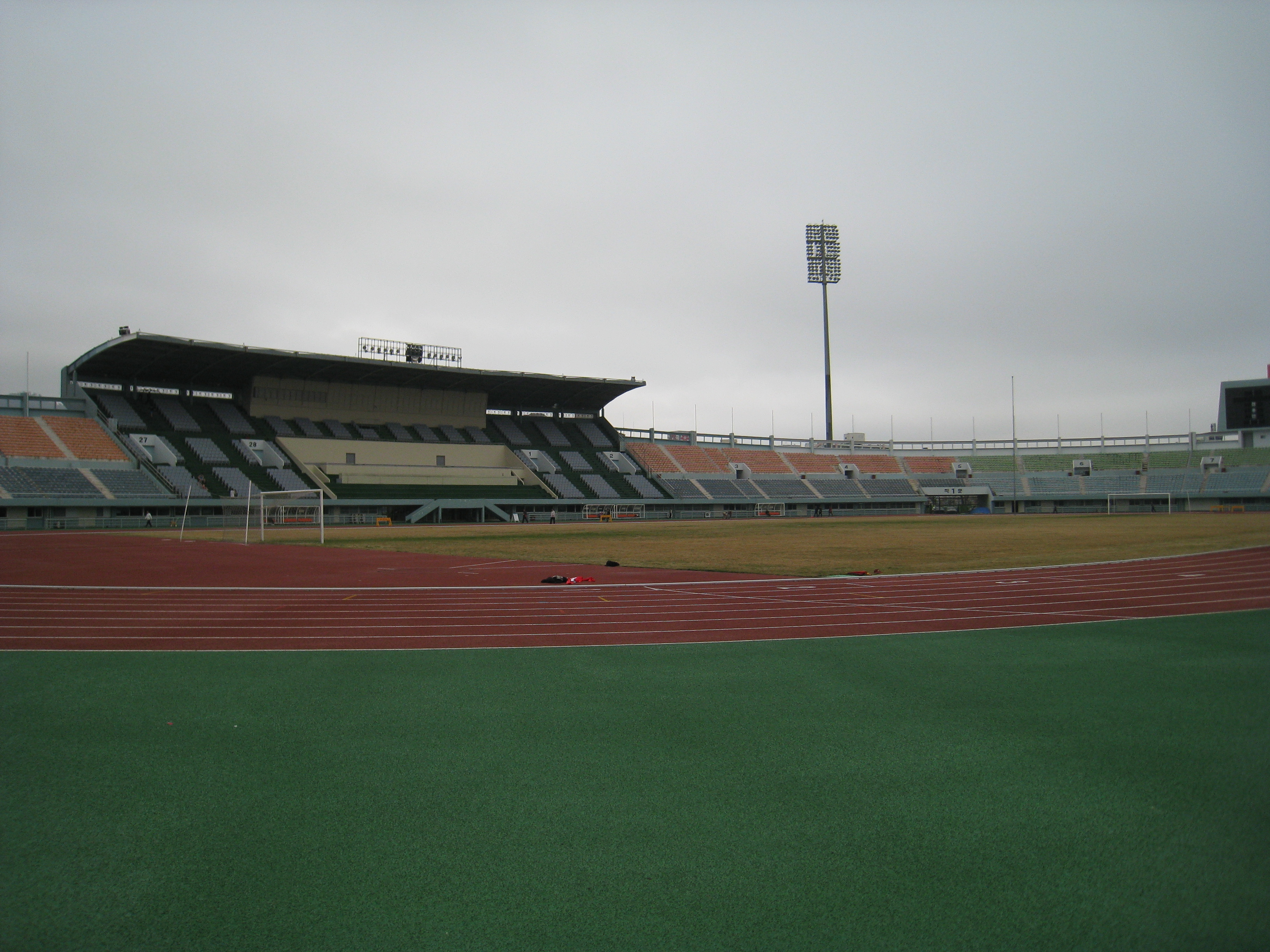
Masan Stadium
