= Yehia Hachem =

Lebanese footballer (born 1981)

Personal information
- Date of birth: 14 July 1981 (age 45)
- Place of birth: Beirut, Lebanon
- Position: Midfielder

Youth career
- 1995–2000: Nejmeh

Senior career*
Years	Team	Apps	(Gls)
2000–2008	Nejmeh		
2008–2011	Mabarra		

International career
2001–2006	Lebanon	16	(0)
- * Club domestic league appearances and goals

Yehia Hachem (Arabic: يحيى هاشم; born 14 July 1981) is a Lebanese former footballer who played as a midfielder.

== Club career ==
Hachem started his youth career at Nejmeh on 12 April 1995, making his senior debut in the 2000–01 Lebanese Premier League. He was named Best Player of the 2004–05 season, and was included in the Team of the Season.

Hachem joined Mabarra in the 2008 summer transfer window.

== Personal life ==
Hachem's brother, Bilal, played as a goalkeeper.

== Honours ==
Nejmeh

- Lebanese Premier League: 2001–02, 2003–04, 2004–05
- Lebanese Elite Cup: 2001, 2002, 2003, 2004, 2005
- Lebanese Super Cup: 2000, 2002, 2004
- AFC Cup runner-up: 2005
- Lebanese FA Cup runner-up: 2002–03, 2003–04

Mabarra

- Lebanese Super Cup runner-up: 2008

Individual

- Lebanese Premier League Best Player: 2004–05
- Lebanese Premier League Team of the Season: 2004–05

== See also ==
- List of association football families
