= Mohammad Fahad =

Kuwaiti footballer (1981–2013)

Mohamed Fahad
Personal information
- Full name: Mohamed Fahad Al Mutairi
- Date of birth: 17 January 1981
- Place of birth: Kuwait City, Kuwait
- Date of death: 17 June 2013 (aged 32)
- Height: 1.74 m (5 ft 8 1/2 in)
- Position: Midfielder

Youth career
- Al Qadsia

Senior career*
| Years | Team | Apps | (Gls) |
| 1998–2008 | Al Qadsia | | |
| 2008–2009 | Al-Naser | | |
| 2010–2013 | Al Salibikhaet | | |

International career
| 2001–2005 | Kuwait | 6 | (0) |
- * Club domestic league appearances and goals as of 19 May 2013

Mohammad Fahad (17 January 1981 – 17 June 2013) was a football player from Kuwait.

Mohammad Fahad began playing with Qadsia SC before the age of 18, and won many titles with the club. This included the Kuwaiti Premier League four times, the Crown Prince Cup four times, the Al Kurafi Cup twice and the GCC Champions League twice.

Mohammed Fahad was one of the best players in the Qadsia SC who played in the centre-forward position. A large number of injuries eventually slowed down his movements.

On 15 May 2008, Fahad announced that if he did not recover from his current injury, he would retire from football. On 11 September 2008, the Board of Directors of Qadsia approved to retire Mohammed Fahad after a match with Al Ahly SC. On 16 October 2008, it was announced that Mohammad had joined Al Nasr SC for one season on loan, postponing his retirement. In a non-official match played in May 2013, Mohammed Fahad collided with another player, causing him severe bleeding in the brain. He was in a coma until the dawn of 17 June 2013, when he died.

== Achievements ==
- Kuwaiti Premier League (four times): 1998/1999 and 2002/2003 and 2003/2004 and 2004/2005
- Crown Prince Cup (four times): 2001/2002 and 2003/2004 and 2004/2005 and 2005/2006
- Al Kurafi Cup (twice): 2002/2003 and 2005/2006
- Kuwait Federation Cup (once): 2007/2008
- GCC Champions League (twice): 1999/2000 and 2005/2006
