= Mohsen Bayatinia =

Iranian footballer and manager

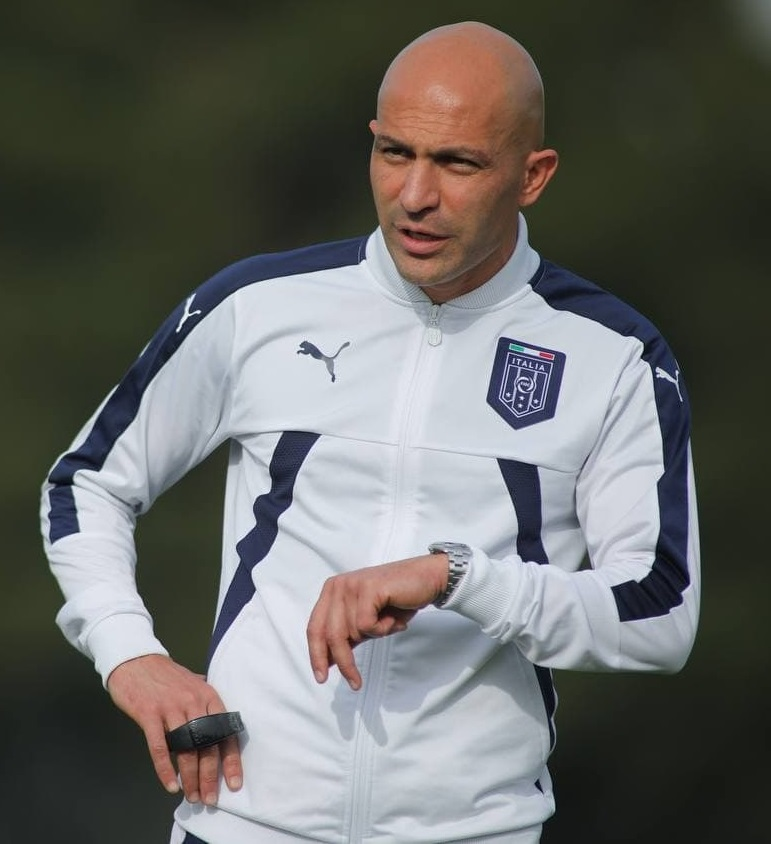

Personal information
- Full name: Mohsen Bayatinia
- Date of birth: April 9, 1980 (age 46)
- Place of birth: Abadan, Iran
- Height: 1.83 m (6 ft 0 in)
- Position: Forward

Team information
- Current team: Saipa (B team manager)

Youth career
- Persepolis

Senior career*
Years	Team	Apps	(Gls)
2001–2006	Pas	?	(23)
2006–2007	Paykan	27	(11)
2007–2008	Esteghlal	7	(0)
2008–2011	Saba Qom	70	(22)
2011	Mes Kerman	11	(1)
2013–2014	Zob Ahan	33	(4)
2014–2015	Gostaresh	4	(1)
2015–2016	Sisaket	14	(1)

International career^{‡}
2002	Iran U23	7	(2)
2002–2003	Iran	8	(0)

Managerial career
- 2017–2018: Rah Ahan
- 2019–: Saipa (youth)
- 2021: Saipa (caretaker)
Medal record
Representing Iran
Asian Games
Gold medal – first place	2002 Busan	Team competition
- * Club domestic league appearances and goals as of 10 December 2014 ‡ National team caps and goals as of 30 August 2003

Mohsen Bayatinia (Persian: محسن بیاتی‌نیا, born April 9, 1980, in Abadan) is a former Iranian football player and coach.

== Club career ==
=== Club career statistics ===
As of 24 December 2011

Club performance			League		Cup		Continental		Total	
Season	Club	League	Apps	Goals	Apps	Goals	Apps	Goals	Apps	Goals
Iran			League		Hazfi Cup		Asia		Total	
2001–02	Pas	Pro League		2			-	-		
2002–03	Pas	Pro League		6			-	-		
2003–04	Pas	Pro League		7			-	-		
2004–05	Pas	Pro League	23	3			8	3		
2005–06	Pas	Pro League	16	5			-	-		
2006–07	Paykan	Pro League	27	11	3	3	-	-	30	14
2007–08	Esteghlal	Pro League	7	0			-	-		
2008–09	Saba	Pro League	25	7	0	0	4	0	29	7
2009–10	Saba	Pro League	23	7	4	2	-	-	27	9
2010–11	Saba	Pro League	22	8	1	0	-	-	23	8
2011–12	Mes	Pro League	11	1	2	0	-	-	13	1
2012–13	Mes	Pro League	11	1	2	0	-	-	13	1
2012–13	Zob Ahan	Pro League	15	1	2	0	-	-	17	1
2013–14	Zob Ahan	Pro League	19	3	0	0	-	-	19	3
2014–15	Gostaresh	Pro League	4	1	0	0	-	-	4	1
2015–16	Sisaket	Thai League 2	14	1	0	0	-	-	14	1
Career total				61			12	3		

- Assist Goals

Season	Team	Assists
06–07	Paykan	3
08–09	Saba	1
09–10	Saba	3
10–11	Saba	1
11–12	Mes Kerman	0

== International career ==
He was a member of Iran national football team at the West Asian Football Federation Championship 2002. He was also a member of Iran Under-23 team that won the Gold Medal at the 2002 Asian Games in Busan. He scored Iran's winning goal at the final against Japan.
