= Fouad Hijazi =

Lebanese football player and coach (born 1973)

Personal information
- Full name: Fouad Moussa Hijazi
- Date of birth: 27 June 1973 (age 53)
- Place of birth: Monrovia, Liberia
- Height: 1.77 m (5 ft 10 in)
- Position: Midfielder

Team information
- Current team: Lebanon U23 (assistant coach)

Senior career*
Years	Team	Apps	(Gls)
1996–1997	Bourj		
1997–2007	Sagesse		
2007–2009	Irshad		
2009–2010	Khoyol		

International career
2002	Lebanon U23		(1)
1993–2003	Lebanon	51	(1)

Managerial career
- Sagesse
- Tadamon Sour (assistant)
- Bourj (assistant)
- 2020–2022: Bourj
- 2022–2023: Ansar (assistant)
- 2023–2024: Mabarra
- 2024–2025: Bourj
- 2025: Akhaa Ahli Aley
- 2026–: Lebanon U23 (assistant)
- * Club domestic league appearances and goals

Fouad Moussa Hijazi (Arabic: فؤاد موسى حجازي; born 27 June 1973) is a football manager and former player who is the assistant coach of the Lebanon national under-23 team. Born in Liberia, he played for the Lebanon national team.

A midfielder, Hijazi played for Bourj, Sagesse, Irshad, and Khoyol at club level. He also played for Lebanon in the 2000 AFC Asian Cup.

== International career ==
In 2002, Hijazi played for the Lebanon Olympic team at the 2002 Asian Games, scoring a goal in an 11–0 win against Afghanistan.

== Managerial career ==
On 3 November 2020, during the 2020–21 season, Hijazi was appointed head coach of Lebanese Premier League side Bourj. He won his first title on 1 August 2021, after winning the 2021 Lebanese Challenge Cup.

On 26 June 2022, Hijazi was appointed assistant coach to Jamal Taha at Ansar. He returned as head coach of Bourj in summer 2024. He was appointed head coach of Akhaa Ahli Aley in March 2025.

On 30 July 2026, Hijazi was appointed as assistant coach to the Lebanon national under-23 team, working under Bassem Marmar.

== Career statistics ==
=== International ===
Scores and results list Lebanon's goal tally first, score column indicates score after each Hijazi goal.

List of international goals scored by Fouad Hijazi
No.	Date	Venue	Opponent	Score	Result	Competition	Ref.
1	5 December 1996	Beirut Municipal Stadium, Beirut, Lebanon	Georgia	2–2	4–2	Friendly	

== Honours ==
=== Player ===
Sagesse

- Lebanese Second Division: 1998–99
- Lebanese Premier League runner-up: 2001–02
- Lebanese FA Cup runner-up: 2005–06
- Lebanese Federation Cup runner-up: 2004

=== Manager ===
Bourj

- Lebanese Challenge Cup: 2021

== See also ==
- List of Lebanon international footballers born outside Lebanon
