= Khaled Afarah =

Yemeni footballer

Personal information
- Full name: Khaled Abdou Afarah
- Date of birth: 21 January 1974 (age 52)
- Place of birth: Yemen
- Height: 1.71 m (5 ft 7 1/2 in)
- Position: Defender

Senior career*
Years	Team	Apps	(Gls)
1990–1998	Al-Tilal		
1998–2001	Tadamon Sour		
2001–2005	Al-Tilal		
2005–2006	Al-Wahda (San'a')		
2006–2008	Al-Tilal		

International career
1993–2006	Yemen		
- * Club domestic league appearances and goals

Khaled Afarah (Arabic: خالد عفارة, born 21 January 1974) is a Yemeni football defender who played for Al-Tilal.

== Honours ==
Al-Tilal'

- Yemeni League: 1990–91, 2004/05
- Yemeni Presidents Cup: 2007
- Yemeni Naseem Cup: 2003
- Yemeni Ali Muhsin al-Murisi Cup: 2003
