= Issawa Singthong =

Thai footballer (born 1980)

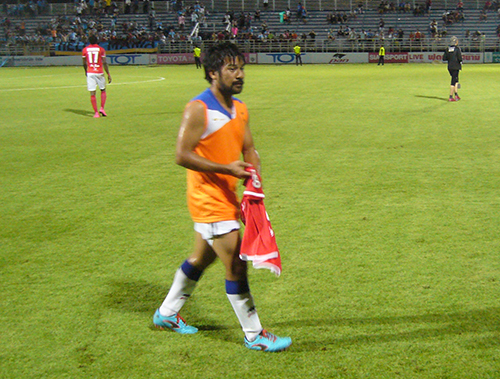

Personal information
- Full name: Issawa Singthong
- Date of birth: 7 October 1980 (age 46)
- Place of birth: Bangkok, Thailand
- Height: 1.63 m (5 ft 4 in)
- Position: Defensive midfielder

Youth career
- 1996–1998: Air Technical Training School

Senior career*
Years	Team	Apps	(Gls)
1998–2002	Royal Thai Air Force	83	(11)
2003–2006	Pisico Bình Định	71	(14)
2006–2008	An Giang	47	(9)
2008	TOT	9	(0)
2009	Đồng Tháp	26	(8)
2011	Chula United	3	(0)
2012–2013	Chiangrai United	28	(2)
2014	Air Force Central	28	(0)
2015	Chiangmai	16	(1)
2015	TOT	11	(0)
Total		322	(45)

International career
2002–2004	Thailand	24	(5)

Managerial career
- 2022: Bankhai United
- 2022–2023: Lâm Đồng
- 2023: Tiền Giang
- 2023–2024: Khelang United
- 2024–: Phitsanulok Unity
Medal record
Thailand under-23
Sea Games
Gold medal – first place	Sea Games 2003	Football
- * Club domestic league appearances and goals

Issawa Singthong (Thai: อิศวะ สิงห์ทอง, born 7 October 1980) is a Thai football coach and former professional player. A midfielder, he was a Thai international. Issawa is known among fans for his ability to speak fluent Vietnamese.

== Honours ==
=== Club ===
Royal Thai Air Force F.C.

- Thai Premier League Champion (1) : 1999
- Thai FA Cup Winnres (1) : 2001

SQC Bình Định F.C.

- Vietnamese Cup Winnres (2) : 2003, 2004

=== International ===
Thailand U-23

- Tiger Cup Winnres (1) : 2002
- Southeast Asian Games Gold Medal (1); 2003
