= Artýom Nazarow =

Turkmen footballer

Artyom Nazarow
Personal information
- Date of birth: 20 June 1977 (age 49)
- Place of birth: Turkmenistan
- Height: 1.66 m (5 ft 5 1/2 in)
- Position: Midfielder

Senior career*
Years	Team	Apps	(Gls)
2001–2004	Nisa Asgabat	-	( –)
2005	Mordovia Saransk	27	(0)
2005–2006	Nisa Asgabat	-	( –)

International career
2003–2004	Turkmenistan	8	(1)
- * Club domestic league appearances and goals

Artýom Wýaçeslawowiç Nazarow (born 20 June 1977) is a Turkmen football midfielder who played for Turkmenistan in the 2004 AFC Asian Cup. He also played for Nisa Asgabat and Mordovia Saransk.
