= Salem Saad =

Emirati footballer (1978-2009)

Personal information
- Full name: Salem Saad Mubarak Saad Al-Abadla
- Date of birth: 1 September 1978
- Place of birth: United Arab Emirates
- Date of death: 18 November 2009 (aged 31)
- Place of death: United Arab Emirates
- Height: 1.78 m (5 ft 10 in)
- Position: Striker

Senior career*
Years	Team	Apps	(Gls)
1998–2009	Al-Shabab		
2009	Al-Nasr		

International career
2004–2009	United Arab Emirates	39	(2)
- * Club domestic league appearances and goals

Salem Saad Mubarak Saad Al-Abadla (1 September 1978 – 18 November 2009) was an Emirati footballer who played as a striker.

== Career ==
Saad played club football for Al-Shabab and Al-Nasr.

He also played at international level for United Arab Emirates national football team between 2004 and 2009, scoring 2 goals in 39 appearances.

== Death ==
Saad died of a heart attack during a training session on 18 November 2009.
