= Khaled Abdulqoddus =

Kuwaiti footballer

Personal information
- Full name: Khaled Abdulqoddus Zadah
- Date of birth: June 9, 1980 (age 46)
- Place of birth: Kuwait
- Height: 1.67 m (5 ft 6 in)
- Positions: Attacking midfielder; winger

Youth career
- 1990–1994: Al-Arabi

Senior career*
Years	Team	Apps	(Gls)
1995–2010	Al-Arabi		
2010–2011	→ Al Yarmouk (loan)		
2011–2012	→ Al Shabab (loan)		

International career
1998–2006	Kuwait	25	(3)

Managerial career
- 2013–2015: Brazuca Academy (assistant-coach)
- 2016–2018: Falcons Academy (assistant-coach)
- 2019–: Al-Arabi (director)
- * Club domestic league appearances and goals

Khaled Abdulqoddus (Arabic: خالد عبد القدوس, born 9 June 1980) is a Kuwaiti former footballer who played as an attacking midfielder for Kuwaiti Premier League side Al Shabab on loan from Al-Arabi.

He played for Al-Arabi in the 2007 AFC Champions League group stage.
