= Mohammad Kassas =

Lebanese footballer (born 1976)

Personal information
- Full name: Mohammad Ali Kassas
- Date of birth: 1 July 1976 (age 50)
- Place of birth: Maqne, Lebanon
- Height: 1.86 m (6 ft 1 in)
- Position: Striker

Team information
- Current team: Ahed (assistant coach)

Youth career
- Mabarra

Senior career*
Years	Team	Apps	(Gls)
1988–1997	Mabarra		
1997	Ansar	0	(0)
1997–1998	Safa		
1999–2000	Shabab Sahel		(2)
2000–2002	Sagesse	45	(18)
2002–2003	Olympic Beirut		
2003–2005	Nejmeh		(43)
2005–2006	Al-Qadsiah		(6)
2006–2007	Sagesse		(4)
2007–2008	Ahed		(2)
2008–2009	Nawair		(5)
2009	Shabab Sahel		(6)
2009–2010	Sagesse		
2010–2011	Safa		(16)
2011–2013	Al-Ramtha	33	(16)
2012	→ Mabarra (loan)		
2013–2014	Nabi Chit		
2014	Al-Ramtha	9	(2)
2014–2016	Sagesse		
2016–2017	Safa	11	(3)
2021	Sagesse		

International career
2002	Lebanon U23		(3)
2001–2009	Lebanon	26	(3)

Managerial career
- 2026–: Ahed (assistant)
- * Club domestic league appearances and goals

Mohammad Ali Kassas (Arabic: محمد علي قصاص; born 1 July 1976) is a Lebanese former professional footballer who played as a striker. He is an assistant coach with Lebanese Premier League club Ahed.

Kassas was the Lebanese Premier League top goal-scorer for Nejmeh twice in a row, scoring 22 goals in 2003–04 and 21 goals in 2004–05. He also played for the Lebanon national team, scoring three goals in 26 appearances.

== Club career ==
Kassas started his senior career in 1988, aged 12, at Mabarra in the Lebanese Fourth Division. He helped the side reach the Lebanese Second Division, before moving on a trial to Ansar during the summer of 1997. In 1997 Kassas moved to Safa and played for one season. During the 1999–2000 season, Kassas played for Shabab Sahel, before moving to Sagesse for two seasons; he scored 18 league goals in 45 games with the side. In 2002, Kassas moved to Olympic Beirut for $500,000 in the largest deal in Lebanese history, with whom he won the domestic double, then to Nejmeh in 2003. At Nejmeh, Kassas was crowned top goalscorer of the Lebanese Premier League twice in a row, scoring 22 goals in 2003–04 and 21 goals in 2004–05. He also won the Lebanese Premier League in both seasons.

In 2005, Kassas moved to Saudi Arabian side Al-Qadsiah for one season, where he scored six league goals. He returned to Lebanon the following season, signing for Sagesse in 2006. He then moved to Ahed, before moving to Syria in 2008 as he signed for Nawair. After half a season in Syria, Kassas returned once again to Lebanon, signing first for Shabab Sahel in 2009, for whom he scored 6 league goals, then for Sagesse in 2009.

In 2010, Kassas joined Safa, helping them reach the final of the 2010 AFC Cup. In 2011, he left Lebanon and signed for Jordanian side Al-Ramtha; he scored 16 league goals in 33 games in two seasons at the club. Kassas was also sent on loan to Mabarra in 2012. helping them gain promotion to the Lebanese Premier League. Kassas returned to Lebanon in 2013, signing for Nabi Chit and also helping them gain promotion to the Lebanese Premier League. In 2014 Kassas returned to Al-Ramtha, before making his final return to Lebanon in 2014, signing for Sagesse. In 2016, Kassas joined Safa and scored three goals in 11 matches during the 2016–17 season, where he retired.

In March 2021, Kassas returned from retirement, resigning for Sagesse in the Lebanese Second Division ahead of the second leg. He made one appearance in the Lebanese FA Cup.

== International career ==
In 2002, Kassas played for the Lebanon Olympic team at the 2002 Asian Games, scoring a hat-trick in an 11–0 win against Afghanistan.

== Managerial career ==
In April 2022, Kassas was appointed technical director of Nejmeh.

== Personal life ==
Kassas's son, Ali, is also a footballer.

== Honours ==
Olympic Beirut

- Lebanese Premier League: 2002–03
- Lebanese FA Cup: 2002–03

Nejmeh

- Lebanese Premier League: 2003–04, 2004–05

Ahed

- Lebanese Premier League: 2007–08

Individual

- Lebanese Premier League top scorer: 2003–04, 2004–05
- GCC Golden Boot :2009–10
- Lebanese Premier League Team of the Season: 2001–02, 2003–04, 2004–05, 2008–09

== See also ==
- List of association football families
