= Fawaz Al-Khater =

Qatari footballer (born 1981)

Fawaz Al Khater
Personal information
- Full name: Fawaz Daoud Sultan Abdullah Al-Khater
- Date of birth: September 27, 1981 (age 45)
- Place of birth: Qatar
- Height: 1.77 m (5 ft 9 1/2 in)
- Position: Defender

Youth career
- 1993–2001: Al Arabi

Senior career*
Years	Team	Apps	(Gls)
2001–2008	Al Arabi	48	(0)
2009–2011	Umm Salal	28	(0)
2010	→ Lekhwiya (loan)	1	(0)
2011–2013	El Jaish	10	(0)
2013–2014	Muaither		

International career
2002	Qatar	1	(0)
- * Club domestic league appearances and goals

Fawaz Daoud Sultan Abdullah Al-Khater (born September 27, 1981) is a Qatari footballer, who currently plays for El Jaish. He is the brother of Nayef Al Khater, and cousin of Meshal Mubarak.

== Career ==
Fawaz and his brother, Naif, started their sports career training in gymnastics while they were very young. Every day after school, they would go home directly to practice gymnastics in their yard. They were also accompanied by Meshal Mubarak, their maternal cousin. They were swayed to turn to football and join Al Arabi's youth team by Mubarak Mustafa. He eventually advanced to the senior team of Al Arabi, before moving to Umm Salal in 2009.

The defender joined in August 2010 on loan to Lekhwiya and returned to his club Umm Salal in January 2011.
