= Bilal Abdulrahman =

Qatari footballer

Personal information
- Full name: Bilal Abdulrahman Abu Hamda
- Date of birth: November 15, 1980 (age 45)
- Place of birth: Qatar
- Height: 1.75 m (5 ft 9 in)
- Position: Midfielder

Senior career*
Years	Team	Apps	(Gls)
1999–2002	Al Sadd	5	(0)
2001–2002	→ Al Ahli (loan)	3	(1)
2002	Mons	0	(0)
2002–2006	Al Sadd	43	(4)
2006–2007	Al Khor	9	(0)
2007–2008	Al Shamal	4	(0)
2008–2010	Al Kharaitiyat	33	(1)
2010–2011	Al Gharafa	8	(0)
2011–2015	Al Ahli	1	(0)
2015–2016	Al-Shahania		

International career
2004	Qatar	1	(0)
- * Club domestic league appearances and goals as of 2/5/2013

Bilal Abdulrahman (born November 14, 1983) is a Qatari footballer. He currently plays as a midfielder. He has played for the Qatar national football team.

In 2003, he had a trial with Paris Saint-Germain F.C. and impressed the coach Luis Fernandez. However, he was to be loaned to Belgian team Mons for 6 months before he could play for the French side. He did not make any league appearances for the club and returned to Al Sadd.
