= Ali Badavi =

Iranian footballer

Personal information
- Full name: Ali "Naji" Badavi
- Date of birth: 20 June 1982 (age 44)
- Place of birth: Ahvaz, Iran
- Position: Defender

Senior career*
Years	Team	Apps	(Gls)
2001–2006	Foolad		(6)
2006–2007	Esteghlal Ahvaz	25	(1)
2007–2009	Foolad		(2)
2009–2010	Sanat Naft	13	(1)

International career^{‡}
2001–2003	Iran U23	?	(1)
2002–2006	Iran	24	(0)
Medal record
Representing Iran
Asian Games
Gold medal – first place	2002 Busan	Team competition
- * Club domestic league appearances and goals as of 15 November 2009 ‡ National team caps and goals as of 22 December 2006

Ali "Naji" Badavi (born 20 June 1982) is an Iranian footballer who last played for the Sanat Naft in Azadegan League.

== Club career ==
Badavi started his career at Foolad FC, however on his return from China after the 2004 Asian Cup, his troubles continued with Foolad FC and eventually left for city rival Esteghlal Ahvaz where he has yet to win a regular spot in the team. Ali Badavi continued his excellent run for Esteghlal Ahvaz in the Iran Premier League (2005–2006) Season. His form was good enough for yet another recall for international duty.

=== Club career statistics ===
Last Update 24 May 2010

Club performance			League		Cup		Continental		Total	
Season	Club	League	Apps	Goals	Apps	Goals	Apps	Goals	Apps	Goals
Iran			League		Hazfi Cup		Asia		Total	
2001–02	Foolad	Persian Gulf Cup		4			-	-		
2002–03	Foolad	Persian Gulf Cup	24	1			-	-		
2003–04	Foolad	Persian Gulf Cup		0			-	-		
2004–05	Foolad	Persian Gulf Cup		1			-	-		
2005–06	Foolad	Persian Gulf Cup	0	0				1		
2006–07	Esteghlal Ahvaz	Persian Gulf Cup	25	1			-	-		
2007–08	Foolad	Azadegan League		0			-	-		
2008–09	Foolad	Persian Gulf Cup	24	2			-	-		
2009–10	Sanat Naft	Azadegan League	13	1			-	-		
Total	Iran			10				1		
Career total				10				1		

- Assist Goals

Season	Team	Assists
06–07	Esteghlal Ahvaz	1
08–09	Foolad	3

== International career ==
He made his debut for Iran national football team on 1 September 2002 versus Jordan.

He also played for the Iranian Olympic team during the 2002 Asian Games in Busan, and soon after became a player who was regularly called up to the national team.

During Iran's 2004 AFC Asian Cup game versus Oman, Badavi and Rezaei began physically fighting with each other in the middle of the game after a series of mistakes. Badavi was suspended for 2 games and returned in the semis versus China, where his last minute, close-range miss proved to be costly. The following season, he did not have good form and was not called up to the national team any more.
