= Fadi Ghosson =

Lebanese footballer (born 1979)

Personal information
- Full name: Fadi Mohammed Ghosson
- Date of birth: 15 May 1979 (age 47)
- Place of birth: Shmustar, Lebanon
- Height: 1.89 m (6 ft 2 in)
- Position: Striker

Senior career*
Years	Team	Apps	(Gls)
–1999	Olympic Dmit		
1999–2004	Ansar		(33)
2005–2009	Ansar		(25)
2009	Bankstown City Lions		
2010	West Sydney Berries		

International career
2002	Lebanon U23		(3)
1999–2006	Lebanon	10	(0)
- * Club domestic league appearances and goals

Fadi Mohammed Ghosson (Arabic: فَادِي مُحَمَّد غُصْن; born 15 May 1979) is a Lebanese former professional footballer who played as a striker.

== Club career ==
Ghosson joined Ansar on 7 April 1999, coming from Olympic Dmit. After having moved to Australia in 2004, he returned to Ansar in 2005. He remained until 2009, scoring a total of 58 league goals.

Ghosson later moved back to Australia, playing for Bankstown City Lions in 2009, and West Sydney Berries in 2010.

== International career ==
Ghosson played for the Lebanon national team between 1999 and 2006, being capped 10 times. In 2002, he played for the Olympic team at the 2002 Asian Games, scoring a hat-trick in an 11–0 win against Afghanistan.

== Personal life ==
After Ghosson and his fiancée got married in 2004, the two moved to Australia.
