= Rashid Al-Dosari =

Bahraini footballer (born 1980)

Personal information
- Full name: Rashid Rahman Saif Al-Dossari
- Date of birth: March 24, 1980 (age 46)
- Place of birth: Bahrain
- Height: 1.77 m (5 ft 9 1/2 in)
- Position: Midfielder

Senior career*
Years	Team	Apps	(Gls)
2000–2004	Muharraq Club		
2004–2005	Al-Arabi		
2005–2016	Muharraq Club		
2005–2006	→Al-Khor (loan)		

International career^{‡}
2001–2008	Bahrain	75	(3)
- * Club domestic league appearances and goals as of December 10, 2006 ‡ National team caps and goals as of December 10, 2008

Rashid Al-Dosari (Arabic: راشد الدوسري; born March 24, 1980) is a Bahraini former professional footballer.

== Club career ==
At the club level, Al-Dosari plays as a midfielder for the Muharraq Club as of 2005.

== International career ==
He has been called up to the Bahrain national football team.
