= Abdullah Nahar =

Kuwaiti footballer

Personal information
- Full name: Abdullah Nahar Al Fadhli
- Date of birth: 31 March 1981 (age 45)
- Place of birth: Kuwait City, Kuwait
- Height: 1.75 m (5 ft 9 in)
- Position: Forward

Team information
- Current team: retire

Youth career
- Al Fahaheel

Senior career*
Years	Team	Apps	(Gls)
1999–2003	Al Fahaheel		
2003–2012	Al Kuwait		
Total		???	(??)

International career^{‡}
2002–2004	Kuwait	11	(1)
- * Club domestic league appearances and goals as of 5 November 2010 ‡ National team caps and goals as of 5 November 2010

Abdullah Nahar (Arabic: عبدالله نهار; born 31 March 1981) is a former Kuwaiti footballer who was played as a forward for Al Kuwait & Al Fahaheel.
