= Ahmed Hassan Taleb =

Bahraini footballer

Ahmed Hassan Taleb (born 29 March 1980) is a Bahraini footballer now play as midfielder.

== Club career ==
2001-2008 Al-Riffa

2008-2012 Al-Manama

2012–present East Riffa

== International career ==
He has made 41 appearances for the Bahrain national football team, scoring 4 goals.
