= Hamad Al-Tayyar =

Kuwaiti footballer

Hamad Al Tayyar
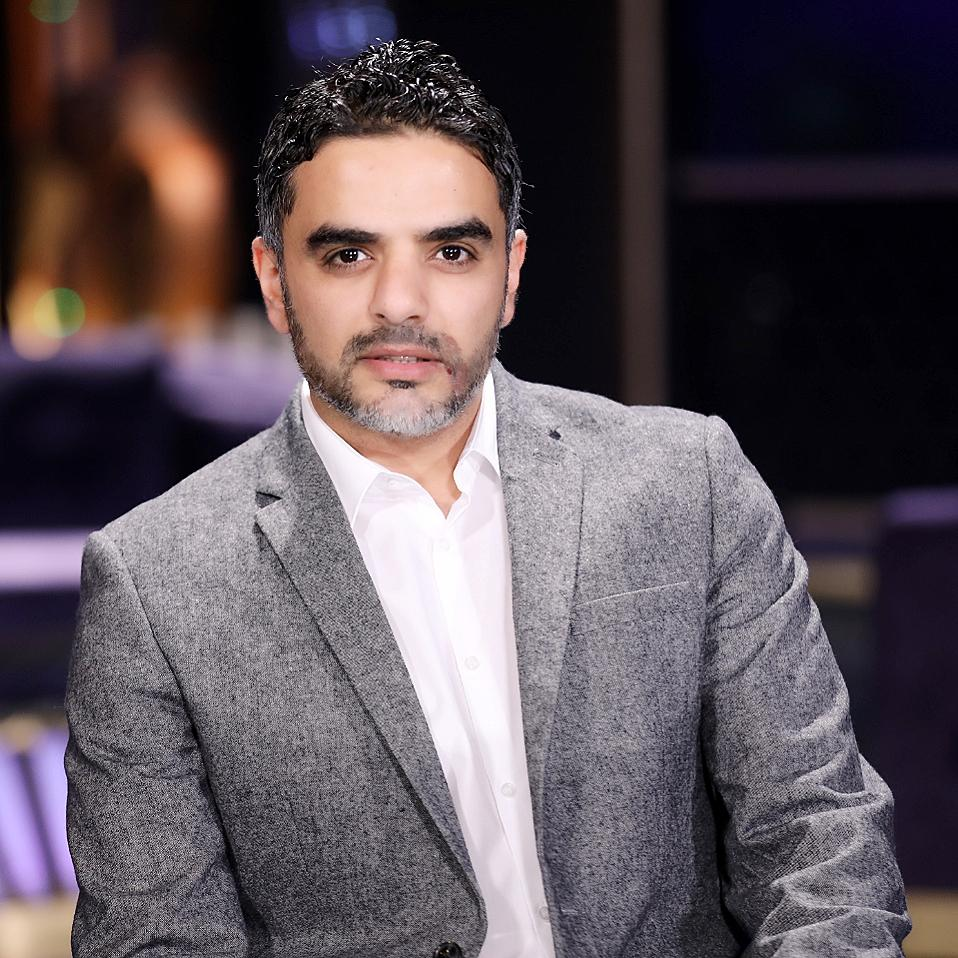
- 2023

Personal information
- Full name: Hamad Abdullah Al Tayyar
- Date of birth: 10 February 1982 (age 44)
- Place of birth: Kuwait City, Kuwait
- Height: 1.82 m (5 ft 11 1/2 in)
- Position: Midfielder

Senior career*
Years	Team	Apps	(Gls)
1999–2007	Kazma	71	(19)

International career
2000–2007	Kuwait	25	(0)
- * Club domestic league appearances and goals as of 14:43, 18 February 2011 (UTC)

Hamad Al Tayyar (Arabic: حمد الطيار; born 10 February 1982) is a Kuwaiti footballer.

== Kazma SC ==
Hamad played with Kazma 2000-2007. He retired in 2007 after an automobile accident.
