= North Korea national football team results (2000–2009) =

This article provides details of international football games played by the North Korea national football team from 2000 to 2009.

== Results ==
=== 2000 ===
8 February Friendly	Syria	5–1	North Korea	Damascus, Syria
		Report

13 February Friendly	Syria	0–0	North Korea	Damascus, Syria
		Report

16 February Friendly	Lebanon	1–0	North Korea	Beirut, Lebanon
		Report

25 March 2000 AFC Asian Cup qualification	North Korea	0–0	Thailand	Kuala Lumpur, Malaysia
		Report		Stadium: Shah Alam Stadium; Attendance: 15,150; Referee: Yam-Ming Chan (Hong Kong)

27 March 2000 AFC Asian Cup qualification	Malaysia	1–1	North Korea	Kuala Lumpur, Malaysia
	Yusof 58'	Report	Ko Jong-nam 6'	Stadium: Shah Alam Stadium; Attendance: 18,000; Referee: Naotsugu Fuse (Japan)

29 March 2000 AFC Asian Cup qualification	Chinese Taipei	0–2	North Korea	Kuala Lumpur, Malaysia
		Report	Ryang Kyu-sa 12', 21'	Stadium: Shah Alam Stadium; Attendance: 4,000; Referee: Jerry Andre (Philippines)

4 April 2000 AFC Asian Cup qualification	Thailand	5–3	North Korea	Bangkok, Thailand
	Damrong-Ongtrakul 34'; Surasiang 35'; Piturat 73'Noosarung 86'; Thonkanya 88'	Report	Ju Song-il 28'; Kim Ho-gun 53'; Ko Jong-nam 60'	Stadium: Supachalasai Stadium

6 April 2000 AFC Asian Cup qualification	North Korea	4–1	Malaysia	Bangkok, Thailand
	Ri Kyong-min 16'; Ryang Kyu-sa 49'; Ri Hyok-chol 73', 84'	Report	Ooi Hoe Guan 26'	Stadium: Supachalasai Stadium; Attendance: 20,000

9 April 2000 AFC Asian Cup qualification	North Korea	1–0	Chinese Taipei	Bangkok, Thailand
	Ri Hyok-chol 53'	Report		Stadium: Supachalasai Stadium

=== 2001 ===
23 January Friendly	Egypt	1–0	North Korea	Ismailia, Egypt
	El-Said 7' (pen.)	Report

28 January Friendly	Jordan	1–0	North Korea	Zarqa, Jordan
		Report		Stadium: Prince Mohammed Stadium

30 January Friendly	Jordan	0–2	North Korea	Zarqa, Jordan
		Report		Stadium: Prince Mohammed Stadium

23 July Friendly	Saudi Arabia	1–0	North Korea	Kuala Lumpur, Malaysia
		Report

3 August 2001 Four Nations Tournament	China	2–2 (2–4 p)	North Korea	Shanghai, China
	Shen Si 25'; Zhang Enhua 51'	Report	Ri Gwang-chun 48'; So Min-chol 59'	Stadium: Shanghai Stadium; Referee: Kim Young-joo (South Korea)
	Penalties
	Yu Genwei (penalty missed); Shen Si (penalty missed); Qi Hong (penalty scored); Zhang Yuning (penalty scored)		Jon Yong-chol (penalty scored); Kim Yong-jun (penalty scored); Ri Man-chol (penalty scored); Myong Song-chol (penalty scored)

5 August 2001 Four Nations Tournament final	North Korea	1–1 (a.e.t.) (5–3 p)	Kuwait	Shanghai, China
	Jon Chol 61'	Report	Al-Shammari 90+3'	Stadium: Shanghai Stadium; Referee: Zhang Yeduan (China)

=== 2002 ===
7 February Friendly	Singapore	2–1	North Korea	Kallang, Singapore
	Nasir 46'; Baksin 53'	Report	So Min-chol 87'	Stadium: National Stadium; Referee: Hanium Yang Panya (Thailand)

10 February 2002 King's Cup	Qatar	1–1	North Korea	Bangkok, Thailand
	Nasser 55'	Report	Kim Yong-su 50'	Stadium: Supachalasai Stadium

12 February 2002 King's Cup	North Korea	4–2	Singapore	Bangkok, Thailand
	Choe Ung-chon 20'; Ri Kum-chol 66', 80'; Kim Yong-jun 85'	Report	Faduhasny 1', 71'	Stadium: Supachalasai Stadium

14 February 2002 King's Cup	Thailand	0–1	North Korea	Bangkok, Thailand
		Report	Li Oun-Choy 60'	Stadium: Supachalasai Stadium

16 February 2002 King's Cup final	Thailand	0–0 (3–4 p)	North Korea	Bangkok, Thailand
		Report		Stadium: Supachalasai Stadium

7 September Friendly	South Korea	0–0	North Korea	Seoul, South Korea
		Report

28 September 2002 Asian Games	Hong Kong	1–2	North Korea	Changwon, South Korea
	Poon Yiu Cheuk 66'	Report	Han Song-chol 59'; Hong Yong-jo 82'	Stadium: Changwon Stadium

1 October 2002 Asian Games	North Korea	5–0	Pakistan	Yangsan, South Korea
	Jon Chol 12', 72'; Rim Kun-u 68'; Kim Yong-su 71', 85'	Report		Stadium: Yangsan Stadium

5 October 2002 Asian Games	North Korea	0–2	Kuwait	Ulsan, South Korea
		Report	Al-Salamah 25'; Abdullah 26'	Stadium: Munsu Football Stadium

8 October 2002 Asian Games	Thailand	1–0	North Korea	Busan, South Korea
	Noywech 52'	Report		Stadium: Gudeok Stadium

=== 2003 ===
16 February 2003 King's Cup	Thailand	2–2	North Korea	Bangkok, Thailand
	Chaikamdee 27'; Thonglao 55'	Report	Kim Yong-jun 54'; Kim Myong-won 87'	Stadium: Supachalasai Stadium

18 February 2003 King's Cup	Sweden	1–1	North Korea	Bangkok, Thailand
	Skoog 21'	Report	Pak Yong-chol 85'	Stadium: Supachalasai Stadium

20 February 2003 King's Cup	North Korea	2–2	Qatar	Bangkok, Thailand
	Nam Song-chol 12'; Jon Yong-chol 20'	Report	Al-Enazi 25', 52'	Stadium: Supachalasai Stadium

22 February 2003 King's Cup final	Sweden	4–0	North Korea	Bangkok, Thailand
	Skoog 3', 74'; Grahn 25'; Johannesson 54'	Report		Stadium: Supachalasai Stadium; Referee: Chaiwat Kunsuta (Thailand)

24 March 2004 AFC Asian Cup qualification	North Korea	2–0	India	Pyongyang, North Korea
	So Hyok-chol 44', 70'	Report

30 March 2004 AFC Asian Cup qualification	India	1–1	North Korea	Margao, India
	Vijayan 29'	Report	Choe Hyon-u 85'

4 September 2004 AFC Asian Cup qualification	North Korea	0–1	Lebanon	Pyongyang, North Korea
		Report	Farah 56'	Attendance: 95,000

27 October 2004 AFC Asian Cup qualification	North Korea	1–3	Iran	Pyongyang, North Korea
	Myong Song-chol 61'	Report	Karimi 47', 79'; Navidkia 87'	Stadium: Kim Il-sung Stadium; Attendance: 30,000; Referee: Qassim Shaaban (Kuwait)

3 November 2004 AFC Asian Cup qualification	Lebanon	1–1	North Korea	Beirut, Lebanon
	Hamieh 59'	Report	Kim Myong-chol 62'

12 November 2004 AFC Asian Cup qualification	Iran	3–0; Awarded (Note: Iran were awarded a 3–0 win after North Korean players abandoned the match after 60 minutes due to firecrackers being thrown from Iranian fans)	North Korea	Tehran, Iran
	Daei 52' (pen.)	Report		Stadium: Azadi Stadium; Attendance: 40,000; Referee: Khader Haj Khader (Syria)

18 November 2004 AFC Asian Cup qualification	Jordan	3–0	North Korea	Amman, Jordan
	Shelbaieh 7'; Al-Shboul 89'; Al-Zboun 90'	Report		Stadium: Azadi Stadium

28 November 2004 AFC Asian Cup qualification	North Korea	0–3; Awarded (Note: Jordan were awarded a 3–0 win after North Korean immigration officials failed to issue the Jordanian team visas, meaning they were refused entry into the country)	Jordan	Pyongyang, North Korea
		Report

=== 2004 ===
18 February 2006 FIFA World Cup qualification	Yemen	1–1	North Korea	Sanaa, Yemen
	Al-Selwi 73'	Report	Hong Yong-jo 85'	Stadium: Althawra Sports City Stadium; Attendance: 15,000; Referee: Yousuf Husain (Bahrain)

31 March 2006 FIFA World Cup qualification	North Korea	0–0	United Arab Emirates	Pyongyang, North Korea
		Report		Stadium: Kim Il-sung Stadium; Attendance: 20,000; Referee: Zhou Weixin (China)

9 June 2006 FIFA World Cup qualification	Thailand	1–4	North Korea	Bangkok, Thailand
	Senamuang 51'	Report	Kim Yong-su 42', 71'; Sin Yong-nam 52'; Hong Yong-jo 67'	Stadium: Rajamangala Stadium; Attendance: 30,000; Referee: Vladislav Tseytlin (Uzbekistan)

8 September 2006 FIFA World Cup qualification	North Korea	4–1	Thailand	Pyongyang, North Korea
	An Yong-hak 49', 73'; Hong Yong-jo 55'; Ri Hyok-chol 60'	Report	Suksomkit 72'	Stadium: Yanggakdo Stadium; Attendance: 20,000; Referee: Masoud Moradi (Iran)

13 October 2006 FIFA World Cup qualification	North Korea	2–1	Yemen	Pyongyang, North Korea
	Ri Han-jae 1'; Hong Yong-jo 64'	Report	Jaber 76'	Stadium: Yanggakdo Stadium; Attendance: 15,000; Referee: Võ Minh Trí (Vietnam)

17 November 2006 FIFA World Cup qualification	United Arab Emirates	1–0	North Korea	Dubai, United Arab Emirates
	Obaid 58'	Report		Stadium: Rashid Stadium; Attendance: 2,000; Referee: Halim Abdul Hamid (Malaysia)

=== 2005 ===
3 February Friendly	Kuwait	0–0	North Korea	Dalian, China
	Obaid 58'	Report

9 February 2006 FIFA World Cup qualification	Japan	2–1	North Korea	Midori-ku, Japan
	Ogasawara 4'; Oguro 90+1'		Nam Song-chol 61'	Stadium: Saitama Stadium 2002; Attendance: 60,000; Referee: Khalil Al Ghamdi (Saudi Arabia)

7 March 2005 East Asian Championship qualification	North Korea	6–0	Mongolia	Taipei, Taiwan
	Kim Kwang-hyok 18', 39', 66'; Ri Hyok-chol 22', 30'; Hong Yong-jo 64'	Report		Stadium: Zhongshan Soccer Stadium

9 March 2005 East Asian Championship qualification	Chinese Taipei	0–2	North Korea	Taipei, Taiwan
		Report	Choe Chol-man 13', 14'	Stadium: Zhongshan Soccer Stadium

11 March 2005 East Asian Championship qualification	Guam	0–21	North Korea	Taipei, Taiwan
		Report	Hong Yong-jo 6', 17'; Choe Chol-man 10', 37', 54'; Kim Kwang-hyok 21', 43', 61', 63', 71', 76', 77'; Kim Yong-jun 29', 39', 49'; Kang Jin-hyok 31', 44', 65', 84', 90+1'; Pak Nam-chol 83'	Stadium: Zhongshan Soccer Stadium

13 March 2005 East Asian Championship qualification	Hong Kong	0–2	North Korea	Taipei, Taiwan
		Report	Kang Jin-hyok 43'; Ri Myong-sam 64'	Stadium: Zhongshan Soccer Stadium

25 March 2006 FIFA World Cup qualification	North Korea	1–2	Bahrain	Pyongyang, North Korea
	Pak Song-gwan 63'	Report	Ali 7', 58'	Stadium: Kim Il-sung Stadium; Attendance: 50,000; Referee: Mongkol Rungklay (Thailand)

30 March 2006 FIFA World Cup qualification	North Korea	0–2	Iran	Pyongyang, North Korea
		Report	Mahdavikia 34'; Nekounam 79'	Stadium: Kim Il-sung Stadium; Attendance: 55,000; Referee: Mohammed Kousa (Syria)

3 June 2006 FIFA World Cup qualification	Iran	1–0	North Korea	Tehran, Iran
	Rezaei 45'	Report		Stadium: Azadi Stadium; Attendance: 35,000; Referee: Khalil Al Ghamdi (Saudi Arabia)

8 June 2006 FIFA World Cup qualification	North Korea	0–2	Japan	Bangkok, Thailand
		Report	Yanagisawa 67'; Oguro 89'	Stadium: Supachalasai Stadium; Attendance: 0 (Note: Since there were crowd troubles in the previous two North Korea's home matches, FIFA decided that the next North Korean home match would be moved to a neutral venue (Thailand), and played behind closed doors); Referee: Frank De Bleeckere (Belgium)

31 July 2005 East Asian Championship	North Korea	1–0	Japan	Daejeon, South Korea
	Kim Yong-jun 27'	Report		Stadium: Daejeon World Cup Stadium; Attendance: 23,150; Referee: Tan Hai (China)

4 August 2005 East Asian Championship	South Korea	0–0	North Korea	Jeonju, South Korea
		Report		Stadium: Jeonju World Cup Stadium; Attendance: 27,455; Referee: Ghahremani Mohsen (Iran)

7 August 2005 East Asian Championship	China	2–0	North Korea	Daegu, South Korea
	Li Yan 13'; Xie Hui 65'	Report		Stadium: Daegu Stadium; Attendance: 20,000; Referee: Kim Dong Jin (South Korea)

7 August Friendly	South Korea	3–0	North Korea	Seoul, South Korea
	Chung Kyung-ho 34'; Kim Jin-yong 36'; Park Chu-young 68'	Report		Stadium: Seoul World Cup Stadium

17 August 2006 FIFA World Cup qualification	Bahrain	2–3	North Korea	Riffa, Bahrain
	Isa 49'; Ali 54'	Report	Choe Chol-man 28'; Kim Chol-ho 43'; An Chol-hyok 90'	Stadium: Bahrain National Stadium; Attendance: 3,000; Referee: Shamsul Maidin (Singapore)

24 December 2005 King's Cup	Oman	2–1	North Korea	Phuket, Thailand
	? 14' ? 60'	Report	Nam Song-chol 90'	Stadium: Surakul Stadium

26 December 2005 King's Cup	North Korea	1–1	Latvia	Phuket, Thailand
	An Chol-hyok 26'	Report	Karlsons 65'	Stadium: Surakul Stadium

28 December 2005 King's Cup	Thailand	0–2	North Korea	Phuket, Thailand
		Report	Kim Chol-ho 7'; Hong Yong-jo 9'	Stadium: Surakul Stadium

30 December 2005 King's Cup	Latvia	2–1	North Korea	Phuket, Thailand
	Karlsons 38'; Prohorenkovs 40'	Report	Hong Yong-jo 47'	Stadium: Surakul Stadium

=== 2006 ===
24 February Friendly	Kazakhstan	0–0	North Korea	Larnaca, Cyprus
		Report

=== 2007 ===
19 June 2008 East Asian Championship qualification	North Korea	7–0	Mongolia	Taipa, Macau
	Ri Kum-chol 27', 43'; Jong Tae-se 29', 33', 34', 54'; Sin Yong-nam 35'	Report		Stadium: Estádio Campo Desportivo; Attendance: 300; Referee: Kenji Ogiya (Japan)

21 June 2008 East Asian Championship qualification	North Korea	7–1	Macau	Taipa, Macau
	Ri Kum-chol 5', 18'; Jong Tae-se 10' (pen.), 12', 28', 60'; Pak Chung-il 68'	Report	Chan Kin Seng 46'	Stadium: Estádio Campo Desportivo; Attendance: 300; Referee: Wan Daxue (China)

24 June (Note: North Korea played two games on 24 June 2007. It is unclear which was played first.) 2008 East Asian Championship qualification	North Korea	1–0	Hong Kong	Taipa, Macau
	Mun In-guk 82'	Report		Stadium: Estádio Campo Desportivo; Attendance: 300; Referee: Kenji Ogiya (Japan)

24 June Singapore Invitational Tournament	Singapore	2–1	North Korea	Kallang, Singapore
		Report		Stadium: National Stadium

28 June Singapore Invitational Tournament	North Korea	2–2 (a.e.t.) (3–4 p)	Oman	Kallang, Singapore
		Report		Stadium: National Stadium

1 July Friendly	United Arab Emirates	1–0	North Korea	Jurong West, Singapore
		Report		Stadium: Jurong West Stadium

4 July Friendly	North Korea	1–1	Saudi Arabia	Jurong, Singapore
		Report		Stadium: Jurong Stadium

21 October 2010 FIFA World Cup qualification	Mongolia	1–4	North Korea	Ulaanbaatar, Mongolia
	Selengiin 90+3'	Report	Pak Chol-min 14'; Jong Chol-min 24', 32', 81'	Stadium: National Sports Stadium; Attendance: 4,870; Referee: Hiroyoshi Takayama (Japan)

28 October 2010 FIFA World Cup qualification	North Korea	5–1 (9–2 agg.)	Mongolia	Pyongyang, North Korea
	Pak Chol-min 3', 79'; Kim Kuk-jin 10'; Jong Chol-min 36'; Jon Kwang-ik 90+1'	Report	Lümbengarav 41'	Stadium: Kim Il-sung Stadium; Attendance: 5,000; Referee: Ram Gosh (Bangladesh)

24 December 2007 King's Cup	North Korea	2–2	Uzbekistan	Bangkok, Thailand
	An Chol-hyok 41'; Kim Kum-il 90'	Report	Solomin 53'; Yafarov 65'	Stadium: Rajamangala Stadium

26 December 2007 King's Cup	Thailand	1–0	North Korea	Bangkok, Thailand
	Phetphun 54'	Report		Stadium: Rajamangala Stadium

=== 2008 ===
6 February 2010 FIFA World Cup qualification	Jordan	0–1	North Korea	Amman, Jordan
		Report	Hong Yong-jo 44'	Stadium: Amman International Stadium; Attendance: 16,000; Referee: Tayeb Shamsuzzaman (Bangladesh)

17 February 2008 East Asian Championship	Japan	1–1	North Korea	Chongqing, China
	Maeda 81'	Report	Jong Tae-se 5'	Stadium: Olympic Sports Center; Attendance: 15,000; Referee: Choi Myung-yong (South Korea)

20 February 2008 East Asian Championship	South Korea	1–1	North Korea	Chongqing, China
	Yeom Ki-hun 20'	Report	Jong Tae-se 72'	Attendance: 20,000; Referee: Hiroyoshi Takayama (Japan)

23 February 2008 East Asian Championship	China	3–1	North Korea	Chongqing, China
	Zhu Ting 45'; Wang Dong 55'; Hao Junmin 88'	Report	Ji Yun-nam 35'	Attendance: 20,000; Referee: Hiroyoshi Takayama (Japan)

26 March 2010 FIFA World Cup qualification	North Korea	0–0	South Korea	Shanghai, China
		Report		Stadium: Hongkou Football Stadium (Note: Since North Korea refused to play the anthem and fly the flag of South Korea, the match was moved from Pyongyang to Shanghai, China); Attendance: 20,000; Referee: Saad Kamil Al-Fadhli (Kuwait)

2 June 2010 FIFA World Cup qualification	Turkmenistan	0–0	North Korea	Ashgabat, Turkmenistan
		Report		Stadium: Saparmurat Turkmenbashy Olympic Stadium; Attendance: 20,000; Referee: Khalil Al Ghamdi (Saudi Arabia)

7 June 2010 FIFA World Cup qualification	North Korea	1–0	Turkmenistan	Pyongyang, North Korea
	Choe Kum-chol 72'	Report		Stadium: Kim Il-sung Stadium; Attendance: 25,000; Referee: Saad Kamil Al-Fadhli (Kuwait)

14 June 2010 FIFA World Cup qualification	North Korea	2–0	Jordan	Pyongyang, North Korea
	Hong Yong-jo 44', 72'	Report		Stadium: Yanggakdo Stadium; Attendance: 25,000; Referee: Talaat Najm (Lebanon)

22 June 2010 FIFA World Cup qualification	South Korea	0–0	North Korea	Seoul, South Korea
	Hong Yong-jo 44', 72'	Report		Stadium: Seoul World Cup Stadium; Attendance: 48,519; Referee: Subkhiddin Mohd Salleh (Malaysia)

31 July 2008 AFC Challenge Cup	North Korea	3–0	Sri Lanka	Hyderabad, India
	Peiris 5' (og.); Pak Song-chol 9', 27'	Report		Stadium: G. M. C. Balayogi Athletic Stadium; Attendance: 100; Referee: Võ Minh Trí (Vietnam)

2 August 2008 AFC Challenge Cup	Nepal	0–1	North Korea	Hyderabad, India
		Report	Pak Song-chol 39'	Stadium: G. M. C. Balayogi Athletic Stadium; Attendance: 100; Referee: Valentin Kovalenko (Uzbekistan)

4 August 2008 AFC Challenge Cup	North Korea	1–0	Myanmar	Hyderabad, India
	Ro Hak-su 15'	Report		Stadium: Lal Bahadur Shastri Stadium; Attendance: 100; Referee: Tayeb Shamsuzzaman (Bangladesh)

7 August 2008 AFC Challenge Cup	North Korea	0–1	Tajikistan	Hyderabad, India
		Report	Mukhidinov 39'	Stadium: G. M. C. Balayogi Athletic Stadium; Attendance: 600; Referee: Masaaki Toma (Japan)

13 August 2008 AFC Challenge Cup	Myanmar	0–4	North Korea	New Delhi, India
		Report	Pak Song-chol 10', 12', 44' (pen.); Ro Hak-su 53'	Stadium: Ambedkar Stadium; Attendance: 1,000; Referee: Khalid Al-Senan (United Arab Emirates)

24 August Friendly	Qatar	2–1	North Korea	Doha, Qatar
		Report

29 August Friendly	Uzbekistan	0–0	North Korea	Tashkent, Uzbekistan
		Report

6 September 2010 FIFA World Cup qualification	United Arab Emirates	1–2	North Korea	Abu Dhabi, United Arab Emirates
	Saeed 86'	Report	Choe Kum-chol 72'; An Chol-hyok 81'	Stadium: Mohammed bin Zayed Stadium; Attendance: 10,000; Referee: Ravshan Irmatov (Uzbekistan)

10 September 2010 FIFA World Cup qualification	North Korea	1–1	South Korea	Shanghai, China
	Hong Yong-jo 64' (pen.)	Report	Ki Sung-yueng 69'	Stadium: Hongkou Football Stadium; Attendance: 3,000; Referee: Muhsen Basma (Syria)

15 October 2010 FIFA World Cup qualification	Iran	2–1	North Korea	Tehran, Iran
	Mahdavikia 9'; Nekounam 63'	Report	Jong Tae-se 72'	Stadium: Azadi Stadium; Attendance: 60,000; Referee: Abdullah Al Hilali (Oman)

28 October T&T Cup	Thailand	1–0	North Korea	Hanoi, Vietnam
		Report		Stadium: Mỹ Đình National Stadium

30 October T&T Cup	Vietnam	0–0	North Korea	Hanoi, Vietnam
		Report		Stadium: Mỹ Đình National Stadium

=== 2009 ===
23 January 2009 King's Cup	North Korea	0–1	Lebanon	Phuket, Thailand
		Report	Atwi 72'	Stadium: Surakul Stadium

11 February 2010 FIFA World Cup qualification	North Korea	1–0	Saudi Arabia	Pyongyang, North Korea
	Mun In-guk 28'	Report		Stadium: Kim Il-sung Stadium; Attendance: 48,000; Referee: Ravshan Irmatov (Uzbekistan)

28 March 2010 FIFA World Cup qualification	North Korea	2–0	United Arab Emirates	Pyongyang, North Korea
	Pak Nam-chol 51'; Mun In-guk 90+3'	Report		Stadium: Kim Il-sung Stadium; Attendance: 50,000; Referee: Matthew Breeze (Australia)

1 April 2010 FIFA World Cup qualification	South Korea	1–0	North Korea	Seoul, South Korea
	Kim Chi-woo 86'	Report		Stadium: Seoul World Cup Stadium; Attendance: 48,000; Referee: Abdullah Al Hilali (Oman)

6 June 2010 FIFA World Cup qualification	North Korea	0–0	Iran	Pyongyang, North Korea
		Report		Stadium: Yanggakdo Stadium; Attendance: 30,000; Referee: Sun Baojie (China)

17 June 2010 FIFA World Cup qualification	Saudi Arabia	0–0	North Korea	Riyadh, Saudi Arabia
		Report		Stadium: King Fahd International Stadium; Attendance: 65,000; Referee: Muhsen Basma (Syria)

23 August 2010 East Asian Championship qualification	North Korea	9–2	Guam	Kaohsiung, Taiwan
	Kim Yong-jun 8'; Pak Nam-chol 12'; An Chol-hyok 20', 74', 78', 89'; Choe Kum-chol 28', 41'; Mun In-guk 45+2'	Report	Borja 1'; Cunliffe 19'	Stadium: National Stadium; Attendance: 2,000; Referee: Hajime Matsuo (Japan)

25 August 2010 East Asian Championship qualification	Hong Kong	0–0	North Korea	Kaohsiung, Taiwan
		Report		Stadium: National Stadium; Attendance: 100; Referee: Kim Jong-hyeok (South Korea)

27 August 2010 East Asian Championship qualification	Chinese Taipei	1–2	North Korea	Kaohsiung, Taiwan
	Chang Han 49'	Report	Jong Tae-se 23' (pen.); Ji Yun-nam 61'	Stadium: National Stadium; Attendance: 10,000; Referee: Hajime Matsuo (Japan)

13 October Friendly	Congo	0–0	North Korea	Le Mans, France
		Report		Stadium: Stade Léon-Bollée

21 November Friendly	Zambia	4–1	North Korea	Lusaka, Zambia
	Chamanga 10', 13', 70'; F. Sunzu 90'	Report	Mun In-guk 86' (pen.)	Stadium: Nkoloma Stadium; Referee: Wilson Mpanisi (Zambia)

27 December 9th International Friendship Tournament	North Korea	1–0	Mali	Doha, Qatar
	Hong Yong-jo 55'	Report		Stadium: Jassim bin Hamad Stadium

30 December 9th International Friendship Tournament	Qatar	0–1	North Korea	Doha, Qatar
		Report	Choe Kum-chol 59'	Stadium: Jassim bin Hamad Stadium
