= Juzaili Samion =

Malaysian footballer

Personal information
- Full name: Muhammad Juzaili bin Samion
- Date of birth: 18 May 1981 (age 45)
- Place of birth: Pahang, Malaysia
- Height: 1.78 m (5 ft 10 in)
- Position: Defender

Team information
- Current team: UKM F.C. (assistant coach)

Youth career
- 1998: Wehen Wiesbaden
- 1999: Strasbourg

Senior career*
| Years | Team | Apps | (Gls) |
| 2000–2001 | FCSR Haguenau | 8 | (0) |
| 2001–2006 | Pahang | 87 | (4) |
| 2006–2009 | UPB-MYTeam | 56 | (2) |
| 2010–2012 | Felda United | 59 | (2) |
| 2013–2017 | Sime Darby | 77 | (2) |

International career^{‡}
| 2001–2008 | Malaysia | 20 | (0) |

Managerial career
- 2018–: UKM (Assistant coach)
Medal record
Men's football
Representing Malaysia
Malaysia under-23
SEA Games
| Bronze medal – third place | 2003 Vietnam | Football |
| Silver medal – second place | 2001 Malaysia | Football |
- * Club domestic league appearances and goals as of 22 October 2017 ‡ National team caps and goals as of 31 December 2017

Muhammad Juzaili bin Samion (born 18 May 1981) is a former Malaysian footballer who currently serves as assistant coach for UKM. He was also a Malaysian international.

== Honours ==
Pahang

- Malaysia Super League: 2004
- Malaysia FA Cup: 2006

Felda United FC

- Malaysia Premier League: 2010

Sime Darby FC

- Malaysia Premier League: 2013
- Malaysia FAM Cup: 2017

Malaysia U-23

- SEA Games (silver) Silver: 2001
- SEA Games (bronze) Bronze: 2003
