= Rungroj Sawangsri =

Thai footballer (born 1981)

Personal information
- Full name: Rungroj Sawangsri
- Date of birth: 1 August 1981 (age 45)
- Place of birth: Suphan Buri, Thailand
- Height: 1.76 m (5 ft 9 1/2 in)
- Position: Defender

Senior career*
Years	Team	Apps	(Gls)
1999–2010	Bangkok Glass	179	(14)
2010–2011	Bangkok United	14	(1)
2012	Chiangrai United	8	(0)
2012–2014	Air Force Central	35	(3)
Total		236	(18)

International career
2001–2003	Thailand U23		
2002–2005	Thailand	8	(0)

Managerial career
- 2021: Rajpracha (caretaker)
- 2022: Grakcu Sai Mai United
Medal record
Thailand under-23
Sea Games
Gold medal – first place	Sea Games 2001	Football
Gold medal – first place	Sea Games 2003	Football
- * Club domestic league appearances and goals

Rungroj Sawangsri (Thai: รุ่งโรจน์ สว่างศรี) is a former professional footballer from Thailand.

He has played several times for the Thailand national football team, including a 2006 FIFA World Cup qualifying match.

== Honours ==
International

- Sea Games 2001 Gold medal Thailand U 23
- Sea Games 2003 Gold medal Thailand U 23

Thai Premier League Winner x 2

2002/03 & 2003/04 - Krung Thai Bank FC (Bangkok Glass FC)

Thai Division 1 League Winner x 1

2013 - Air Force Central

== Asian Champions League Appearances ==
#	Date	Venue	Opponent	Score	Result
1.	May 21, 2008	Bangkok, Thailand	Beijing Guoan	5-3	Won
