= 2003 King's Cup =

Tournament details
- Host country: Thailand
- Dates: 16–22 February
- Teams: 4 (from 2 confederations)
- Venue(s): 1 (in 1 host city)

Final positions
- Champions: Sweden (3rd title)
- Runners-up: North Korea
- Third place: Thailand
- Fourth place: Qatar

Tournament statistics
- Matches played: 8
- Goals scored: 30 (3.75 per match)
- Top scorer(s): (Qatar) Mohammed Salem Al-Enazi (4 goals)

The 34th King's Cup finals was held from 16 to 22 February 2003 at the Supachalasai Stadium in Bangkok, Thailand. The King's Cup (คิงส์คัพ) is an annual football tournament; the first tournament was played in 1968.

== Venue ==
Bangkok
Suphachalasai Stadium
Capacity: 19,793
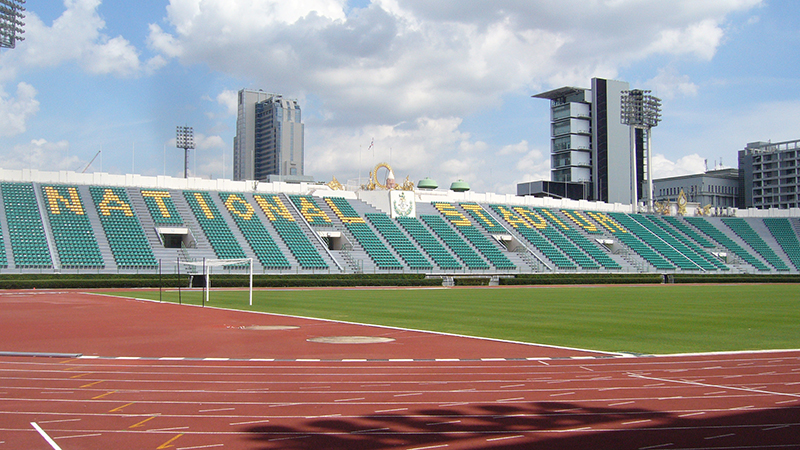

== Tournament ==
=== Round robin tournament ===
Team	Pld	W	D	L	GF	GA	GD	Pts
Sweden	3	2	1	0	8	4	+4	7
North Korea	3	0	3	0	5	5	0	3
Qatar	3	0	2	1	5	6	−1	2
Thailand	3	0	2	1	4	7	−3	2

Source: RSSSF
16 February 2003

Thailand	2–2	North Korea
Sarayuth 27'; Datsakorn 55'		Kim Yong-jun 54'; Kim Myong-won 87'

Supachalasai Stadium, Bangkok

16 February 2003

Qatar	2–3	Sweden
Yasser 24'; Al-Enazi 90' (pen.)		Elmander 17', 25'; Skoog 82'

Supachalasai Stadium, Bangkok

18 February 2003

Thailand	1–1	Qatar
Therdsak 55' (pen.)		Al-Enazi 86'

Supachalasai Stadium, Bangkok

18 February 2003

Sweden	1–1	North Korea
Skoog 21'		Back Young-chul 85'

Supachalasai Stadium, Bangkok

20 February 2003

Sweden	4–1	Thailand
Thanongsak 47' (o.g.); Elmander 63'; Fernerud 66'; Majstorovic 69'		Vachiraban 80'

Supachalasai Stadium, Bangkok

20 February 2003

North Korea	2–2	Qatar
Nam Song-chol 12'; Jon Yong-chol 20'		Al-Enazi 25', 52'

Supachalasai Stadium, Bangkok

=== Third Place Match ===
22 February 2003

Thailand	3–1	Qatar
Manit 24', 33'; Pichitphong 76'		Sayed Bechir 57'

Supachalasai Stadium, Bangkok

=== Final ===
22 February 2003

Sweden	4–0	North Korea
Skoog 3', 74'; Grahn 25'; Johannesson 25'

Supachalasai Stadium, Bangkok
Referee: Chaiwat Kunsuta (Thailand)

== Winner ==
2003 King's Cup champion

Sweden
3rd title

== Scorers ==
4 goals

- (Qatar) Mohammed Salem Al-Enazi

3 goals

- (Sweden) Niklas Skoog

2 goals

- (Sweden) Johan Elmander
- (Thailand) Manit Noywech

1 goal

- (North Korea) Back Young-chul
- (North Korea) Jon Yong-chol
- (North Korea) Kim Myong-won
- (North Korea) Kim Yong-jun
- (North Korea) Nam Song-chol
- (Qatar) Hussein Yasser
- (Qatar) Sayed Ali Bechir
- (Sweden) Alexander Farnerud
- (Sweden) Daniel Majstorović
- (Sweden) Markus Johannesson
- (Sweden) Tobias Grahn
- (Thailand) Datsakorn Thonglao
- (Thailand) Narongchai Vachiraban
- (Thailand) Pichitphong Choeichiu
- (Thailand) Sarayuth Chaikamdee
- (Thailand) Therdsak Chaiman

Own goal

- (Thailand) Tanongsak Prajakkata (playing against Sweden)
