= Zainizam Marjan =

Malaysian footballer

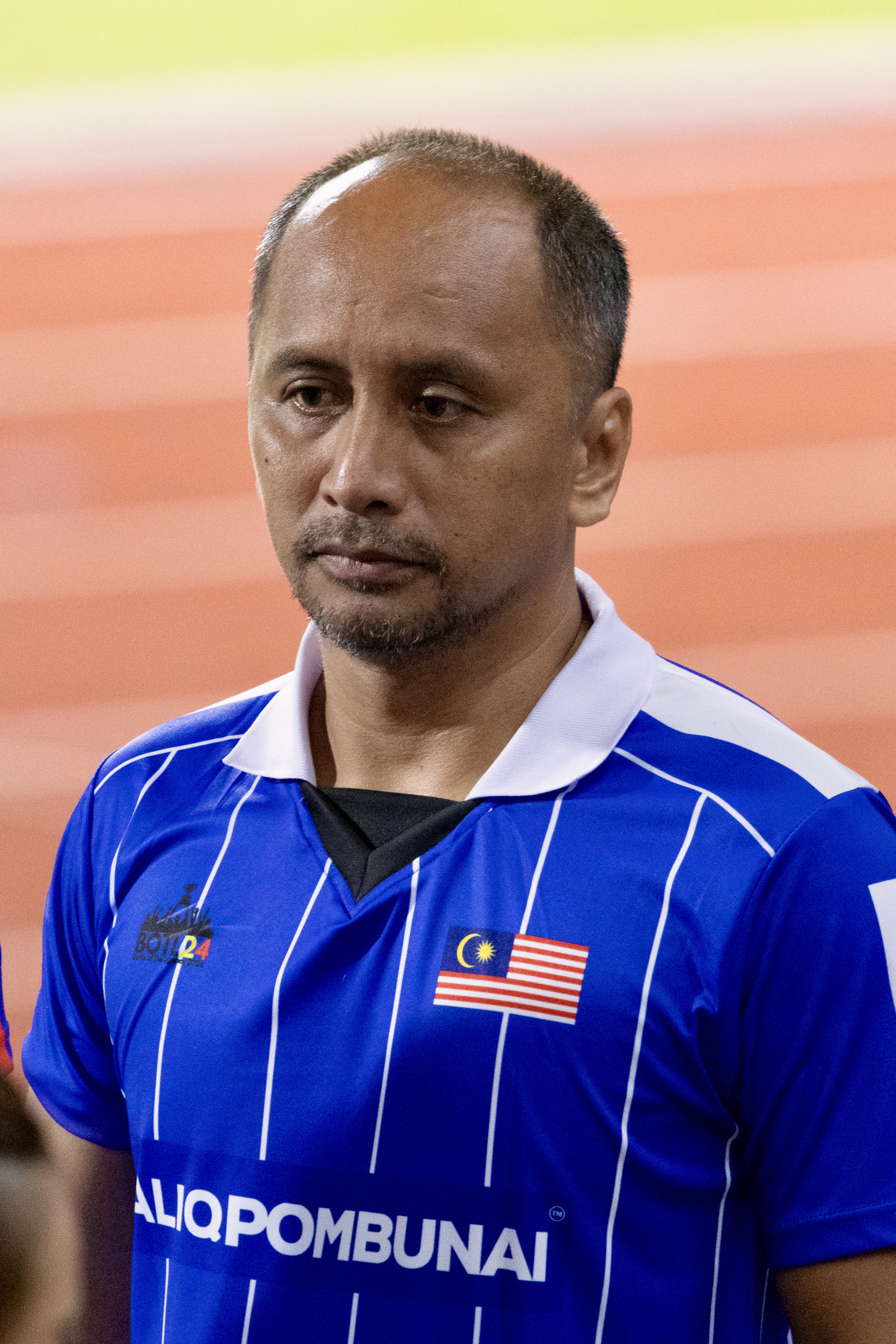
- Zainizam in 2024

Personal information
- Full name: Zainizam Bin Marjan
- Date of birth: 11 May 1980 (age 46)
- Place of birth: Kota Belud, Sabah, Malaysia
- Height: 1.65 m (5 ft 5 in)
- Position: Striker

Team information
- Current team: Sabah
- Number: 20

Youth career
- 2000–2001: Sabah

Senior career*
Years	Team	Apps	(Gls)
2002–2014	Sabah	400+	(62)
2015–	DYS F.C.	78	(17)

International career^{‡}
2002–2003	Malaysia U-23	3	(1)
2002	Malaysia	6	(2)
- * Club domestic league appearances and goals as of 27 March 2014 ‡ National team caps and goals as of 27 March 2014

Zainizam Marjan (born 11 May 1980) is a Malaysian footballer who was a midfielder for Sabah FA in the Malaysia Premier League. He is a former member of Malaysia national football team and the younger brother of Sabah and Malaysia top striker during the 1990s, Matlan Marjan.

== Career ==
Zainizam started his football career with Sabah during the 2002 season. He scored 11 goals in 24 matches during the 2002 season to help Sabah clinch third place in the Malaysia Premier I League. He also helped Sabah to reach the finals of the 2002 Malaysia Cup scoring six goals.

Allan Harris, the national team coach at that time, took him into the national senior team. He then made his international debut against Myanmar on 17 May 2002. He was also featured in the match against Brazil and was part of the Malaysia under-23 2002 Asian Games squad. He was also part of the 2002 Tiger Cup squad.

During 2003, he helped Sabah to finish fourth in the Malaysia Premier I League scoring four goals. He then helped Sabah qualify to the final of Malaysia Cup for the second time, eventually losing to Selangor MPPJ by 3–0.

After that, Zainizam was called up by Allan Harris to represent the Malaysia under-23 side for the 2003 SEA Games. He managed to score 1 goal in the Malaysia 3–4 defeat to host Vietnam. The SEA Games was his last appearances for the national team.

Since joining Sabah in 2000, Zainizam has 62 goals for Sabah. This makes him the second overall top scorer behind Scott Ollerenshaw.

In 2014, Sabah FA officially released him from the current squad.

== International goals ==
#	Date	Venue	Opponent	Score	Result	Competition
Under-23
1.	9 December 2003	Hanoi, Vietnam	Vietnam	3–2	4–3	2003 SEA Games
Senior
1.	11 December 2002	Kelana Jaya, Malaysia	Cambodia	4–0	5–0	Friendly
2.	11 December 2002	Kelana Jaya, Malaysia	Cambodia	5–0	5–0	Friendly

== Honours ==
=== Sabah ===
- Malaysia Cup: runner-up 2002, 2003

=== Malaysia ===
- SEA Games: (bronze) Bronze 2003
