= Nguyễn Minh Nghĩa =

Vietnamese footballer (1977–2026)

Personal information
- Full name: Nguyễn Minh Nghĩa
- Date of birth: 1977
- Place of birth: Đồng Tháp, Vietnam
- Date of death: 4 March 2026 (aged 49)
- Place of death: Đồng Tháp, Vietnam
- Position: Striker

Senior career*
Years	Team	Apps	(Gls)
- Đồng Tháp
- Hoàng Anh Gia Lai
- Cần Thơ

International career
1998–2001	Vietnam U23		
- * Club domestic league appearances and goals

Nguyễn Minh Nghĩa (c. 1977 – 4 March 2026) was a Vietnamese footballer who played for Đồng Tháp, Hoàng Anh Gia Lai, Cần Thơ and Vietnam U23.

== Club career ==
Minh Nghĩa played as a prominent figure of the Đồng Tháp. At that time, he partnered with Nguyễn Trung Vĩnh, forming a notable attacking duo for the team from the Mekong Delta team.

Minh Nghĩa also played on Hoàng Anh Gia Lai when he scored the decisive goal against Đà Nẵng, this ends the match as a 3–2 win during the first match on the second half of the season. On 14 May 2006, he scored a hat-trick in just 7 minutes during the match against Sông Lam Nghệ An, helping his home team win 3–0. His contributions helped his team finish the 2006 V-League season in 4th place.

After he left Hoàng Anh Gia Lai, he spent his time playing Cần Thơ on the Vietnamese First Division until retirement.

== International career ==
In 2001, he was Vietnam U23's squad for the 2001 SEA Games. Minh Nghĩa scored the fourth goal against Brunei during a 5–1 win. However, his team was eliminated in 3rd place on a group table.

On 30 October 2002, Minh Nghĩa was featured in the preliminary squad for the 2002 AFF Championship. However, he did not include in the final squad due to persistent leg injury.

== Death ==
On 4 March 2026, he passed away as a result of an accident in the bathroom, at the age of 49.
