= Emílio da Silva =

East Timorese footballer

Ari
Personal information
- Full name: Emilio Ribeiro Neves da Silva
- Date of birth: 5 April 1982 (age 44)
- Place of birth: Dili, East Timor, Indonesia
- Height: 5 ft 10 in (1.78 m)
- Position: Striker

Youth career
- 2000–2002: FC Zebra

Senior career*
Years	Team	Apps	(Gls)
2002–2004	FC Zebra	38	(20)
2004–2010	AD Esperança	193	(121)
2010–2014	Ad. Dili Oeste		
2015–2017	Carsae FC		

International career^{‡}
2004–2012	Timor-Leste	18	(3)
- * Club domestic league appearances and goals as of 21:28, 28 June 2016 (UTC) ‡ National team caps and goals as of 13 October 2012

Emilio Ribeiro Neves da Silva, known simply as Emílio da Silva; born 5 April 1982 in Dili, Timor Timur, Indonesia, is a former footballer from East Timor who has represented AD Esperança since 2004. Prior to this, da Silva played for FC Zebra for two years, having spent the entirety of his youth career (2000–2002) there also. A prolific striker at club level, he has also notched 10 goals in 25 caps for the Timor-Leste national football team since 2003, and is their all-time top scorer and appearance holder, both by a considerable margin. Da Silva is considered to be the best East Timorese footballer of all time. In 2011, Emilio was the highest paid athlete from East Timor, making $20,000 (USD).

== International career ==
Da Silva scored three goals during Timor-Leste's unsuccessful 2010 FIFA World Cup qualifying campaign, all against Hong Kong.

=== International goals ===
Scores and results list East Timor's goal tally first.

No	Date	Venue	Opponent	Score	Result	Competition
1.	21 October 2007	Kapten I Wayan Dipta Stadium, Gianyar, Indonesia	Hong Kong	1–2	2–3	2010 FIFA World Cup qualification
2.	21 October 2007	Kapten I Wayan Dipta Stadium, Gianyar, Indonesia	Hong Kong	2–1	2–3	2010 FIFA World Cup qualification
3.	28 October 2007	Hong Kong Stadium, Wan Chai, Hong Kong	Hong Kong	1–3	1–8	2010 FIFA World Cup qualification
