= Matlan Marjan =

Malaysian footballer

Personal information
- Full name: Matlan bin Marjan
- Date of birth: 18 October 1968 (age 58)
- Place of birth: Kota Belud, Sabah, Malaysia
- Position: Forward

Youth career
- 1987–1988: Sabah Presidents Cup Team's

Senior career*
Years	Team	Apps	(Gls)
1989–1995	Sabah FA		

International career
1991	Malaysia	1	(2)
1995	Malaysia XI	3	(0)
- * Club domestic league appearances and goals

Matlan Marjan is a former professional football player from the state of Sabah, Malaysia. He is renowned for scoring 2 goals against England for Malaysia in a friendly match on 12 June 1991, the only Malaysian to have done so. He has a younger brother, Zainizam Marjan who also played for Sabah FA and the Malaysia national team.

Matlan is a Sabahan Bajau from Kota Belud, Sabah. He started his professional career by playing in the Presidents Cup. He made his M-League debut in 1989 season by scoring 5 league goals. In 1990 season, he scored 8 (6 league and 2 FA cup goals) of Sabah FA total 16 goals.

In 1991, Matlan earned his first call-up for the national team for a friendly match with Aston Villa. On 12 June 1991, he made his full international debut against England as he equalled the 35-year record of Toni Fritsch as the latest new cap to score twice against England.

In 1995, he made history by becoming the first player from Sabah to captain the national team selection in the match against Flamengo XI.

In the same year, Matlan, along with five other Sabah FA players, was arrested on suspicion of match-fixing scandal. Although the charges against the six were dropped he was severely punished, thus ending his football career. He was banished to another district.

== Honours ==
=== Sabah ===
- Malaysia FA Cup: 1995; runner-up 1994

=== Individual ===
- Sabah FA top scorer: 1990
