= 2010 FIFA World Cup qualification – AFC first round =

International football competition

This page provides the summaries of the AFC first round matches for the 2010 FIFA World Cup qualification.

== Format ==
In this round teams ranked 6–24 were randomly drawn against teams ranked 25–43, and the draw took place on 6 August 2007 in the AFC House in Kuala Lumpur, Malaysia. Teams ranked 1–5 received a bye to the third round.

The matches were held between 8 October 2007 and 30 October 2007. The 11 highest ranked teams (according to the first round seeding) among the 19 winners advanced to the third round of the Asian qualifiers, while the eight remaining teams advanced to the second round in November 2007.

== Summary ==
| Team 1 | Agg. | Team 2 | 1st leg | 2nd leg |
|---|---|---|---|---|
| Pakistan | 0–7 | Iraq | 0–7 | 0–0^{1} |
| Uzbekistan | 11–0 | Chinese Taipei | 9–0 | 2–0 |
| Thailand | 13–2 | Macau | 6–1 | 7–1 |
| Sri Lanka | 0–6 | Qatar | 0–1 | 0–5 |
| China | 11–0 | Myanmar | 7–0 | 4–0^{4} |
| Bhutan | w/o^{2} | Kuwait | | |
| Kyrgyzstan | 2–2 (5–6 p.) | Jordan | 2–0 | 0–2 (aet) |
| Vietnam | 0–6 | United Arab Emirates | 0–1 | 0–5 |
| Bahrain | 4–1 | Malaysia | 4–1 | 0–0 |
| Timor-Leste | 3–11 | Hong Kong | 2–3^{5} | 1–8 |
| Syria | 5–1 | Afghanistan | 3–0 | 2–1^{1} |
| Yemen | 3–2 | Maldives | 3–0 | 0–2 |
| Bangladesh | 1–6 | Tajikistan | 1–1 | 0–5 |
| Mongolia | 2–9 | North Korea | 1–4 | 1–5 |
| Oman | 4–0 | Nepal | 2–0 | 2–0 |
| Palestine | 0–7 | Singapore | 0–4^{1} | 0–3 (awd.)^{6} |
| Lebanon | 6–3 | India | 4–1 | 2–2 |
| Cambodia | 1–5 | Turkmenistan | 0–1 | 1–4 |
| Guam | w/o^{3} | Indonesia | | |

1. For security reasons, Iraq played their home leg in Syria, Palestine played their home leg in Qatar and Afghanistan played their home leg in Tajikistan.
2. Bhutan withdrew.
3. Guam withdrew.
4. FIFA decided to move Myanmar home match to Malaysia.
5. Timor-Leste elected to play their home leg in Indonesia.
6. Palestine failed to appear; Singapore was awarded a 3–0 win. The Palestine Football Federation appealed to have the match rescheduled on the grounds that its players did not receive permits to leave the Gaza Strip, but FIFA dismissed the appeal.

== Matches ==
22 October 2007
19:30 UTC+5

| Pakistan | 0–7 | Iraq |
|---|---|---|
| | Report | Akram 19'; M. Karim 24', 49', 88', 90'; Ghulam 71'; Mohammed 83' |

Punjab Stadium, Lahore
Attendance: 2,500
Referee: Kadyrbek Chynybekov (Kyrgyzstan)
28 October 2007
14:00 UTC+3

| Iraq | 0–0 | Pakistan |
|---|---|---|
| | Report |

Abbasiyyin Stadium, Damascus (Syria) (Note: Due to security concerns, Iraq played their home leg in Syria, Palestine played their home leg in Qatar, and Afghanistan played their home leg in Tajikistan.)
Attendance: 8,000
Referee: Saad Al Fadhli (Kuwait)

Iraq won 7–0 on aggregate.

13 October 2007
16:00 UTC+5

| Uzbekistan | 9–0 | Chinese Taipei |
|---|---|---|
| Shatskikh 4', 16', 34', 57', 77'; Kapadze 26'; Karpenko 43'; Bakayev 54'; Salomov 68' | Report |

Central Army Stadium, Tashkent
Attendance: 7,000
Referee: Ali Hamad Al-Badwawi (United Arab Emirates)
28 October 2007
18:00 UTC+8

| Chinese Taipei | 0–2 | Uzbekistan |
|---|---|---|
| | Report | Inomov 79'; Suyunov 89' |

Chungshan Soccer Stadium, Taipei
Attendance: 800
Referee: Tayeb Shamsuzzaman (Bangladesh)

Uzbekistan won 11–0 on aggregate.

8 October 2007
19:00 UTC+7

| Thailand | 6–1 | Macau |
|---|---|---|
| Chaikamdee 12', 49'; Dangda 21'; Winothai 55' (pen.); Phetphun 82'; Thonglao 90+1' | Report | Kin Seng Chan 23' |

Suphachalasai Stadium, Bangkok
Attendance: 11,254
Referee: Kadyrbek Chynybekov (Kyrgyzstan)
15 October 2007
20:00 UTC+8

| Macau | 1–7 | Thailand |
|---|---|---|
| Kin Seng Chan 90+2' | Report | Dangda 22'; Sukha 39'; Surasiang 43'; Thonglao 48'; Chaikamdee 53', 57', 86' |

Sports Field and Pavilion at MUST, Macau
Attendance: 500
Referee: Abdulrahman Racho (Syria)

Thailand won 13–2 on aggregate.

21 October 2007
16:00 UTC+5:30

| Sri Lanka | 0–1 | Qatar |
|---|---|---|
| | Report | Soria 68' |

Sugathadasa Stadium, Colombo
Attendance: 6,500
Referee: Abdul Bashir (Singapore)
28 October 2007
19:15 UTC+3

| Qatar | 5–0 | Sri Lanka |
|---|---|---|
| Soria 4', 76'; Bechir 17', 55'; Al-Shammari 85' | Report |

Jassim Bin Hamad Stadium, Doha
Attendance: 3,000
Referee: Khalil Al Ghamdi (Saudi Arabia)

Qatar won 6–0 on aggregate.

21 October 2007
20:00 UTC+8

| China | 7–0 | Myanmar |
|---|---|---|
| Qu Bo 17', 81'; Du Zhenyu 22'; Yang Lin 58'; Liu Jian 63'; Li Jinyu 76'; Li Weifeng 79' | Report |

Century Lotus Stadium, Foshan
Attendance: 21,000
Referee: Abdulhameed Ebrahim (Bahrain)
28 October 2007
16:00 UTC+8

| Myanmar | 0–4 | China |
|---|---|---|
| | Report | Wu Wei'an 13'; Liu Jian 14'; Zheng Bin 35'; Zhang Yaokun 39' (pen.) |

KLFA Stadium, Kuala Lumpur (Malaysia) (Note: The home leg of Myanmar was moved to Malaysia on request of both China and Myanmar.)
Attendance: 200
Referee: Abdullah Balideh (Qatar)

China PR won 11–0 on aggregate.

| Bhutan | Cancelled | Kuwait |

Bhutan withdrew.

18 October 2007
15:30 UTC+6

| Kyrgyzstan | 2–0 | Jordan |
|---|---|---|
| Esenkul Uulu 45'; Bokoev 76' | Report |

Spartak Stadium, Bishkek
Attendance: 18,000
Referee: Subrata Sarkar (India)
28 October 2007
19:00 UTC+3

| Jordan | 2–0 (a.e.t.) | Kyrgyzstan |
|---|---|---|
| Shelbaieh 34'; Aqel 51' (pen.) | Report |
Penalties
| Abu Alieh (penalty scored); Bawab (penalty scored); Abu Keshek (penalty scored); Amer (penalty scored); Aqel (penalty scored); Bashar (penalty scored) | 6–5 | (penalty scored) Kudrenko; (penalty scored) Harchenko; (penalty scored) Samsaliev; (penalty scored) Sydykov; (penalty scored) Esenkul Uulu; (penalty missed) Amin |

Amman International Stadium, Amman
Attendance: 12,000
Referee: Abdulhameed Ebrahim (Bahrain)

2–2 on aggregate; Jordan won 6–5 on penalties.

8 October 2007
20:30 UTC+7

| Vietnam | 0–1 | United Arab Emirates |
|---|---|---|
| | Report | Basheer Saeed 79' |

Mỹ Đình National Stadium, Hanoi
Attendance: 20,000
Referee: Yuichi Nishimura (Japan)
28 October 2007
19:00 UTC+4

| United Arab Emirates | 5–0 | Vietnam |
|---|---|---|
| Ismail Matar 13'; Al-Mahri 40'; Al-Shehhi 53'; Mubarak 90'; Al-Kas 90+4' (pen.) | Report |

Al Jazira Mohammed Bin Zayed Stadium, Abu Dhabi
Attendance: 12,000
Referee: Subkhiddin Mohd Salleh (Malaysia)

United Arab Emirates won 6–0 on aggregate.

21 October 2007
18:00 UTC+3

| Bahrain | 4–1 | Malaysia |
|---|---|---|
| Fatadi 4'; John 15'; Abdulrahman 55'; Hubail 90' (pen.) | Report | Bunyamin Omar 45+2' |

Bahrain National Stadium, Manama
Attendance: 4,000
Referee: Yang Zhiqiang (China)
28 October 2007
20:45 UTC+8

| Malaysia | 0–0 | Bahrain |
|---|---|---|
| | Report |

Shah Alam Stadium, Petaling Jaya
Attendance: 2,000
Referee: Lee Gi-Young (South Korea)

Bahrain won 4–1 on aggregate.

21 October 2007
15:30 UTC+8

| Timor-Leste | 2–3 | Hong Kong |
|---|---|---|
| Ary 41', 69' | Report | Cheng Siu Wai 25', 50'; Esteves 35' (o.g.) |

Gianyar Stadium, Gianyar (Indonesia) (Note: Timor-Leste elected to play their home leg in Indonesia.)
Attendance: 1,500
Referee: Rosdi Shaharul (Malaysia)
28 October 2007
15:00 UTC+8

| Hong Kong | 8–1 | Timor-Leste |
|---|---|---|
| Lo Kwan Yee 2'; Chan Siu Ki 5', 78', 85'; Cheung Sai Ho 49'; Cheng Siu Wai 67', 70'; Lam Ka Wai 83' | Report | Ary 53' |

Hong Kong Stadium, Hong Kong
Attendance: 1,542
Referee: Mohsen Torky (Iran)

Hong Kong won 11–3 on aggregate.

8 October 2007
21:00 UTC+3

| Syria | 3–0 | Afghanistan |
|---|---|---|
| Al Zeno 73', 87' (pen.); Al Sayed 81' (pen.) | Report |

Abbasiyyin Stadium, Damascus
Attendance: 3,000
Referee: Khalil Al Ghamdi (Saudi Arabia)
26 October 2007
13:00 UTC+5

| Afghanistan | 1–2 | Syria |
|---|---|---|
| Karimi 16' | Report | Jenyat 17'; Issmael 64' |

Pamir Stadium, Dushanbe (Tajikistan)
Attendance: 2,000
Referee: Ravshan Irmatov (Uzbekistan)

Syria won 5–1 on aggregate.

8 October 2007
21:00 UTC+3

| Yemen | 3–0 | Maldives |
|---|---|---|
| Salem 44'; Al-Hubaishi 66'; Thabit 80' | Report |

Ali Muhsin Al-Muriasi Stadium, Sana'a
Attendance: 3,000
Referee: Mohammad Mansour (Lebanon)
28 October 2007
16:00 UTC+5

| Maldives | 2–0 | Yemen |
|---|---|---|
| Shamveel Qasim 14'; Ashfaq 67' | Report |

Galolhu National Stadium, Malé
Attendance: 8,900
Referee: Subrata Sarkar (India)

Yemen won 3–2 on aggregate.

8 October 2007
15:00 UTC+6

| Bangladesh | 1–1 | Tajikistan |
|---|---|---|
| Mithu 50' | Report | Khakimov 58' (pen.) |

Bangabandhu National Stadium, Dhaka
Attendance: 700
Referee: Abdullah Al Hilali (Oman)
28 October 2007
14:00 UTC+5

| Tajikistan | 5–0 | Bangladesh |
|---|---|---|
| Khakimov 47', 48', 76' (pen.); Mukhiddinov 51'; Vasiev 71' | Report |

Central Stadium, Dushanbe
Attendance: 10,000
Referee: Kadyrbek Chynybekov (Kyrgyzstan)

Tajikistan won 6–1 on aggregate.

21 October 2007
13:00 UTC+8

| Mongolia | 1–4 | North Korea |
|---|---|---|
| Selenge 90+3' | Report | Pak Chol-min 14'; Jong Chol-min 24', 32', 81' |

National Sports Stadium, Ulaanbaatar
Attendance: 4,870
Referee: Hiroyoshi Takayama (Japan)
28 October 2007
16:00 UTC+9

| North Korea | 5–1 | Mongolia |
|---|---|---|
| Pak Chol-min 3', 79'; Kim Kuk-jin 10'; Jong Chol-min 36'; Jon Kwang-ik 90+1' | Report | Lkhümbengarav 41' |

Kim Il-sung Stadium, Pyongyang
Attendance: 5,000
Referee: Ram Gosh (Bangladesh)

Korea DPR won 9–2 on aggregate.

8 October 2007
21:30 UTC+4

| Oman | 2–0 | Nepal |
|---|---|---|
| Bashir 5'; Mudhafar 21' (pen.) | Report |

Sultan Qaboos Sports Complex, Muscat
Attendance: 15,000
Referee: Fareed Al Marzouqi (United Arab Emirates)
28 October 2007
14:30 UTC+5:45

| Nepal | 0–2 | Oman |
|---|---|---|
| | Report | Saleh 29'; Al Hinai 54' |

Dasarath Rangasala Stadium, Kathmandu
Attendance: 10,000
Referee: Satop Tongkhan (Thailand)

Oman won 4–0 on aggregate.

8 October 2007
21:00 UTC+3

| Palestine | 0–4 | Singapore |
|---|---|---|
| | Report | Shi Jiayi 44', 53'; Wilkinson 73'; Noh Alam Shah 86' |

Ahmed bin Ali Stadium, Doha (Qatar)
Attendance: 75
Referee: Mushen Basma (Syria)
28 October 2007
17:00 UTC+8

| Singapore | 3–0 Awarded (Note: Palestine failed to show up. Match was awarded 3–0 to Singapore as a walkover. The Palestinian Football Federation appealed to have the match rescheduled on the grounds that its players did not receive permits to leave the Gaza Strip, but FIFA declined the appeal.) | Palestine |
|---|---|---|
| | Report |

National Stadium, Singapore
Referee: Sun Baojie (China)

Singapore won 7–0 on aggregate.

8 October 2007
21:00 UTC+3

| Lebanon | 4–1 | India |
|---|---|---|
| Antar 33'; Ghaddar 62', 76'; El Ali 63' | Report | Chhetri 30' |

Saida Municipal Stadium, Saida
Attendance: 500
Referee: Saad Al Fahdli (Kuwait)
30 October 2007
15:00 UTC+5:30
(Note: Match originally scheduled for 28 October 2007 postponed and relocated due to heavy rain in Chennai.)

| India | 2–2 | Lebanon |
|---|---|---|
| Chhetri 29'; Dias 90+2' | Report | Ghaddar 72' (pen.), 85' |

Fatorda Stadium, Goa
Attendance: 10,000
Referee: Salem Mujghef (Jordan)

Lebanon won 6–3 on aggregate.

11 October 2007
15:00 UTC+7

| Cambodia | 0–1 | Turkmenistan |
|---|---|---|
| | Report | Karadanov 85' |

National Olympic Stadium, Phnom Penh
Attendance: 3,000
Referee: Ram Gosh (Bangladesh)
28 October 2007
18:00 UTC+5

| Turkmenistan | 4–1 | Cambodia |
|---|---|---|
| Nasyrov 41'; Gevorkyan 50', 66'; Karadanov 74' | Report | Nasa 12' |

Olympic Stadium (Saparmurat), Ashgabat
Attendance: 5,000
Referee: Rustam Saidov (Uzbekistan)

Turkmenistan won 5–1 on aggregate.

| Guam | Cancelled | Indonesia |

Guam withdrew.

== Qualified teams ==
Among the 19 winners, the top 11 winners advanced directly to the third round while the remaining 8 teams advanced to second round.

| Advanced to third round | Advanced to second round |
|---|---|
| Iraq; Uzbekistan; Qatar; China; Kuwait; Jordan; United Arab Emirates; Bahrain; North Korea; Oman; Lebanon | Thailand; Hong Kong; Syria; Yemen; Tajikistan; Singapore; Turkmenistan; Indonesia |

== Goalscorers ==
There were 131 goals scored in 33 matches, for an average of 3.97 goals per match.

5 goals

- (Thailand) Sarayoot Chaikamdee
- (Uzbekistan) Maksim Shatskikh

4 goals

- (Hong Kong) Cheng Siu Wai
- (Iraq) Mahdi Karim
- (Lebanon) Mohammed Ghaddar
- (North Korea) Jong Chol-Min
- (Tajikistan) Numondzhon Khakimov

3 goals

- (Hong Kong) Chan Siu Ki
- (North Korea) Pak Chol-Min
- (Qatar) Sebastián Soria
- (Timor-Leste) Ary

2 goals

- (China) Liu Jian
- (China) Qu Bo
- (India) Sunil Chhetri
- (Macau) Kin Seng Chan
- (Qatar) Sayed Ali Bechir
- (Singapore) Shi Jiayi
- (Syria) Mohamed Al Zeno
- (Thailand) Teerasil Dangda
- (Thailand) Datsakorn Thonglao
- (Turkmenistan) Artur Gevorkyan
- (Turkmenistan) Mamedaly Karadanov

1 goal

- (Afghanistan) Obaidullah Karimi
- (Bahrain) Mahmood Abdulrahman
- (Bahrain) Abdulla Baba Fatadi
- (Bahrain) A'ala Hubail
- (Bahrain) Jaycee John Okwunwanne
- (Bangladesh) Zumratul Hossain Mithu
- (Cambodia) Samel Nasa
- (China) Du Zhenyu
- (China) Li Jinyu
- (China) Wu Wei'an
- (China) Li Weifang
- (China) Yang Lin
- (China) Zhang Yaokun
- (China) Zheng Bin
- (Hong Kong) Cheung Sai Ho
- (Hong Kong) Lam Ka Wai
- (Hong Kong) Lo Kwan Yee
- (India) Steven Dias
- (Iraq) Nashat Akram
- (Iraq) Jassim Mohammed Ghulam
- (Iraq) Emad Mohammed
- (Jordan) Hatem Aqel
- (Jordan) Mahmoud Shelbaieh
- (Kyrgyzstan) Aibek Bokoyev
- (Kyrgyzstan) Cholponbek Esenku Uulu
- (Lebanon) Roda Antar
- (Lebanon) Mahmoud El Ali
- (Malaysia) Mohd Bunyamin Omar
- (Maldives) Ali Ashfaq
- (Maldives) Shamveel Qasim
- (Mongolia) Donorovyn Lkhümbengarav
- (Mongolia) Odkhuu Selenge
- (North Korea) Jon Kwang-Ik
- (North Korea) Kim Kuk-Jin
- (Oman) Mohamed Al Hinai
- (Oman) Fawzi Bashir
- (Oman) Hassan Mudhafar
- (Oman) Hashim Saleh
- (Qatar) Saad Al-Shammari
- (Singapore) Mohd Noh Alam Shah
- (Singapore) John Wilkinson
- (Syria) Maher Al Sayed
- (Syria) Feras Esmaeel
- (Syria) Aatef Jenyat
- (Tajikistan) Dzhomikhon Mukhiddinov
- (Tajikistan) Dilshod Vasiev
- (Thailand) Patiparn Phetphun
- (Thailand) Suree Sukha
- (Thailand) Nirut Surasiang
- (Thailand) Teeratep Winothai
- (Turkmenistan) Mekan Nasyrov
- (United Arab Emirates) Nawaf Al-Darmaki
- (United Arab Emirates) Saeed Al-Kas
- (United Arab Emirates) Ahmed Mohammed Al-Mahri
- (United Arab Emirates) Mohamed Al-Shehhi
- (United Arab Emirates) Ismail Matar
- (United Arab Emirates) Basheer Saeed
- (Uzbekistan) Ulugbek Bakayev
- (Uzbekistan) Islom Inomov
- (Uzbekistan) Timur Kapadze
- (Uzbekistan) Victor Karpenko
- (Uzbekistan) Shavkat Salomov
- (Uzbekistan) Ilhomjon Suyunov
- (Yemen) Fekri Al-Hubaishi
- (Yemen) Mohammed Salem
- (Yemen) Haitham Thabit

1 own goal

- (Timor-Leste) Alfredo Esteves (against Hong Kong)
