= Narongchai Vachiraban =

Thai footballer (born 1981)

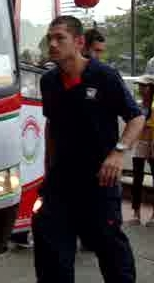

Personal information
- Full name: Narongchai Vachiraban
- Date of birth: 16 February 1981 (age 45)
- Place of birth: Nakhon Pathom, Thailand
- Height: 1.79 m (5 ft 10 in)
- Position: Attacking midfielder

Youth career
- 1996–1998: Bangkok Christian College

Senior career*
Years	Team	Apps	(Gls)
1999–2002	Bangkok Christian College	35	(13)
2003–2004	BEC Tero Sasana	22	(5)
2005	Bình Định	17	(4)
2006–2009	Buriram PEA	79	(12)
2010	Police United	10	(1)
2010	Muangthong United	8	(1)
2011–2013	Chainat Hornbill	32	(0)
2013–2015	PTT Rayong	21	(2)
2016–2017	Chainat Hornbill	7	(0)
2017	PTU Pathumthani	4	(0)
2019	Simork	4	(0)
Total		229	(38)

International career
2000–2003	Thailand U23		
2002–2011	Thailand	24	(3)
Medal record
Thailand under-23
Sea Games
Gold medal – first place	Sea Games 2001	Football
- * Club domestic league appearances and goals

Narongchai Vachiraban (Thai: ณรงค์ชัย วชิรบาล, born 16 February 1981), simply known as Tum (Thai: ตั้ม), is a Thai former professional footballer who plays as an attacking midfielder. He previously played for six other club sides in Thailand and Vietnam.

== International career ==
Narongchai has currently played 24 times for the full Thailand National team and scored 3 goals.

=== International goals ===
#	Date	Venue	Opponent	Score	Result	Competition
1.	December 27, 2002	Jakarta, Indonesia	Vietnam	4–0	Won	2002 Tiger Cup (Semi-finals)
2.	February 20, 2003	Bangkok, Thailand	Sweden	1–4	Lost	2003 King's Cup
3.	July 10, 2004	Bangkok, Thailand	Trinidad and Tobago	3-2	Won	Friendly

== Honours ==
Bangkok Christian College

- Thai Division 1 League: 2001–02

PEA

- Thai Premier League: 2008

Muangthong United

- Thai Premier League: 2010

Thailand U23

- Sea Games Gold Medal: 2001

Thailand

- ASEAN Football Championship: 2002
