= Manit Noywech =

Thai footballer (born 1980)

Personal information
- Full name: Manit Noywech
- Date of birth: 5 March 1980 (age 46)
- Place of birth: Kanchanaburi, Thailand
- Height: 1.78 m (5 ft 10 in)
- Position: Striker

Youth career
- 1995–1997: Banhan-Jamsai Wittaya School
- 1998–1999: Chonburi

Senior career*
Years	Team	Apps	(Gls)
2000–2003	BEC Tero Sasana	78	(27)
2003–2004	Bangkok Bank	22	(8)
2004–2005	Boss Bình Định	27	(12)
2005–2006	Persijap Jepara	26	(11)
2006–2007	Suphanburi	30	(10)
2007–2008	Tobacco Monopoly	23	(13)
2008–2010	Police United	36	(24)
2010–2012	Chiangrai United	15	(11)
2012–2013	Ayutthaya	16	(11)
2013–2014	Kasetsart	20	(15)
2014–2015	North Bangkok	9	(19)
Total		302	(107)

International career
2000–2003	Thailand	22	(6)

Managerial career
- 2015: Singburi
Medal record
Thailand under-23
Southeast Asian Games
Gold medal – first place	2001 Kuala Lumpur	Football
Gold medal – first place	2003 Hanoi & Ho Chi Minh City	Football
- * Club domestic league appearances and goals

Manit Noywech (Thai: มานิตย์ น้อยเวช, born 5 March 1980) is a Thai retired footballer. He is a former striker of Thailand national team and scored 6 goals for the national team and he is known as Rivaldo of Thailand.

== Honours ==
=== Club ===
Suphanburi F.C.

- Provincial League: 2002

Insee Police United F.C.

- Thai Division 1 League: 2009

Ayutthaya F.C.

- Regional League Division 2: 2012

=== International ===
Thailand U23

- Sea Games Gold medal: 2001, 2003
- Asian Games 4th place: 2002

Thailand

- ASEAN Football Championship: 2002

== International goals ==
#	Date	Venue	Opponent	Score	Result	Competition
1.	May 11, 2002	Beijing, China	China	1-3	Lost	Friendly
2.	December 27, 2002	Jakarta, Indonesia	Vietnam	4-0	Won	2002 Tiger Cup
3.	February 22, 2003	Bangkok, Thailand	Qatar	3-1	Won	2003 King's Cup
4.	February 22, 2003	Bangkok, Thailand	Qatar	3-1	Won	2003 King's Cup
5.	November 17, 2003	Bangkok, Thailand	Hong Kong	4-0	Won	2004 Asian Cup Qualification
6.	November 21, 2003	Bangkok, Thailand	Uzbekistan	4-1	Won	2004 Asian Cup Qualification
