= Niklas Skoog =

Swedish footballer (born 1974)

Personal information
- Full name: Jan Niklas Skoog
- Date of birth: 15 June 1974 (age 52)
- Place of birth: Gothenburg, Sweden
- Height: 1.77 m (5 ft 10 in)
- Position: Striker

Youth career
- Hovås IF
- 1986–1990: Västra Frölunda IF

Senior career*
| Years | Team | Apps | (Gls) |
| 1991–1996 | Västra Frölunda IF | 81 | (31) |
| 1996–1998 | MSV Duisburg | 30 | (3) |
| 1998–1999 | 1. FC Nürnberg | 13 | (1) |
| 2000–2001 | Örebro SK | 30 | (15) |
| 2001–2008 | Malmö FF | 112 | (49) |
| 2008 | → Mjällby AIF (loan) | 13 | (5) |
| 2010–2011 | BK Näset | | |

International career
| 1994–1995 | Sweden U21 | 14 | (10) |
| 2002–2004 | Sweden | 9 | (4) |
- * Club domestic league appearances and goals

Jan Niklas Skoog (born 15 June 1974) is a Swedish former professional footballer who played as a striker. He was the Allsvenskan top scorer in 1995 with Västra Frölunda IF and in 2003 with Malmö FF. A full international between 2002 and 2004, he appeared nine times for the Sweden national team, scoring four goals.

== Club career ==
Skoog was the Allsvenskan top scorer for Västra Frölunda in 1995 and for Malmö FF in 2003.

In 2004, Skoog was part of the Malmö FF side that won Allsvenskan. In the final game, he had a penalty kick saved that teammate Jon Inge Høiland scored the rebound of to seal a 1-0 win against Elfsborg that ultimately secured the title.

He initially ended his career for Malmö FF in March 2009. In January 2010, he announced that he would restart his playing career in Swedish lower league club BK Näset.

== International career ==
Having scored 10 goals in 14 games for the Sweden U21 team, Skoog made his full international debut for Sweden on 20 November 2002 in a friendly game against the Czech Republic. On 16 February 2003, he scored his first goal for Sweden in a friendly against Qatar.

Skoog made his first and only competitive appearance for Sweden on 6 September 2003 in a UEFA Euro 2004 qualifier against San Marino, replacing Mattias Jonson as a forward in the 73rd minute. He made his last international appearance for Sweden in a friendly against Portugal on 29 April 2004, replacing Marcus Allbäck at half time in a 2–2 draw.

== Career statistics ==
=== International ===
Appearances and goals by national team and year
| National team | Year | Apps | Goals |
|---|---|---|---|
| Sweden | 2002 | 1 | 0 |
| Sweden | 2003 | 5 | 4 |
| Sweden | 2004 | 3 | 0 |
| Total | | 9 | 4 |

Scores and results list Sweden's goal tally first, score column indicates score after each Skoog goal.

List of international goals scored by Niklas Skoog
| No. | Date | Venue | Opponent | Score | Result | Competition | Ref. |
|---|---|---|---|---|---|---|---|
| 1 | 16 February 2003 | National Stadium, Bangkok, Thailand | Qatar | 3–2 | 3–2 | 2003 King's Cup | |
| 2 | 18 February 2003 | National Stadium, Bangkok, Thailand | North Korea | 1–0 | 1–1 | 2003 King's Cup | |
| 3 | 22 February 2003 | National Stadium, Bangkok, Thailand | North Korea | 1–0 | 4–0 | 2003 King's Cup | |
| 4 | 22 February 2003 | National Stadium, Bangkok, Thailand | North Korea | 4–0 | 4–0 | 2003 King's Cup | |

== Honours ==
Malmö FF

- Allsvenskan: 2004

Sweden

- King's Cup: 2003

Individual

- Allsvenskan top scorer: 1995, 2003
