= Selengiin Odkhüü =

Mongolian footballer (born 1984)

Personal information
- Full name: Сэлэнгийн Одхүү
- Date of birth: May 4, 1984 (age 42)
- Place of birth: Mongolia
- Position: Defender

Team information
- Current team: Selenge Press, Ulaanbaatar

Senior career*
Years	Team	Apps	(Gls)
2005–2010	Ordiin-Od		
2011–	Selenge Press, Ulaanbaatar		

International career
2005–2011	Mongolia	13	(1)
- * Club domestic league appearances and goals

Selengiin Odkhüü (Mongolian: Сэлэнгийн Одхүү: * 4 May 1984) is a Mongolian international footballer. He made his first appearance for the Mongolia national football team in 2005 and has appeared for it 13 times.

== International career ==
=== International goals ===
Scores and results list Mongolia's goal tally first.

No	Date	Venue	Opponent	Score	Result	Competition
1.	21 October 2007	National Sports Stadium, Ulaanbaatar, Mongolia	North Korea	1–4	1–4	2010 FIFA World Cup qualification
