= Tobias Grahn =

Swedish footballer (born 1980)

Personal information
- Date of birth: 5 March 1980 (age 46)
- Place of birth: Karlskrona, Sweden
- Height: 1.85 m (6 ft 1 in)
- Position: Attacking midfielder

Youth career
- Rödeby AIF

Senior career*
Years	Team	Apps	(Gls)
1997–1998	Öster	1	(0)
1998–1999	Beira-Mar	0	(0)
1999	Öster	6	(0)
1999–2002	Lyngby BK	36	(2)
2001–2003	Vålerenga	36	(9)
2003–2004	Malmö	21	(3)
2004–2006	AGF	47	(10)
2006–2007	→ OB (loan)	15	(6)
2007–2008	Gimnàstic	9	(2)
2007	→ Hertha BSC (loan)	13	(0)
2008–2009	Randers	19	(0)
2010–2011	Mjällby	50	(2)
2012	Örebro	19	(2)
2013–2014	Brønshøj	8	(0)
2014	GVI	0	(0)
Total		280	(36)

International career^{‡}
1997	Sweden U17	9	(1)
2001	Sweden U21	3	(1)
2001–2003	Sweden	4	(1)
- * Club domestic league appearances and goals as of 3 March 2020 ‡ National team caps and goals as of 2003

Tobias Grahn (born 5 March 1980) is a Swedish former professional footballer who played as an attacking midfielder. He won the 2002 Norwegian Football Cup with Vålerenga and the 2004 Allsvenskan with Malmö FF. A full international between 2001 and 2003, he won four caps for the Sweden national team, scoring one goal.

== Club career ==
In August 2003, he left Norwegian club Vålerenga and returned to Sweden, signing with Malmö FF. While with Malmö, Grahn made 21 appearances and scored three goals but soon fell out of favor with coach Tom Prahl. As a result, he left the club and returned to Denmark, signing with AGF Aarhus. In his first season with Aarhus, Grahn enjoyed great success appearing in 22 league matches and scoring 8 goals and providing 13 assists as the clubs playmaker. After appearing in 47 league matches and scoring 10 goals in his two seasons at the club, Grahn was sent on loan to Odense BK for the 2006–07 season. Grahn got off to a great start with Odense scoring six goals in 15 league matches and helped the Danish club to an impressive run in the 2006–07 UEFA Cup. As a result, he began to draw interest from clubs in the top leagues in Europe. During the winter transfer period he was sold to Spain's Gimnàstic. On 18 February 2007, Grahn played his first La Liga match for Gimnàstic against Racing de Santander. While with Gimnàstic, he appeared in nine league matches and scored two goals but injuries limited his chances with the club. At the end of the season, Gimnàstic was relegated to the Spanish Second Division, and Grahn was sent on loan to Hertha BSC in Germany.

In the January transfer window of 2009, Grahn was rumored to return to Danish football, with Brøndby IF being the most likely destination. On 28 January 2009, he was transferred to Danish super league club Randers on a three-year contract. Grahn was so disappointed about his own performances and lack of success at Randers FC that he offered to leave the club in November 2009. So on 12 November 2009, he was granted a free transfer by the club and returned on 14 November 2009 to Berlin for a trial with 1. FC Union Berlin. He signed for Swedish top-tier club Mjällby AIF before the start of the 2010 season. During his two years at the club he was a success on the pitch and a big profile at the club but also the cause of conflicts and controversial statements.

During January 2012, it was reported that Grahn was close to agreeing to terms with New York Red Bulls in Major League Soccer. He was also spotted near his old training grounds at Malmö, training by his own and wearing his old Malmö FF clothes. However, in early February 2012, Grahn announced that he would be joining Örebro SK. After a disappointing first season where the club was relegated Grahn announced that he had come to an agreement with Örebro to end his contract. He told the media that playing in the second tier did not "harmonize with his ambitions".

In March 2013 he signed a contract with Brønshøj Boldklub in the Danish 1st Division. In August 2014 he was persuaded to play for Gentofte-Vangede IF in the Danish 2nd Division East by head coach Søren Fjorting whom Grahn knew from their past at Lyngby Boldklub.

== International career ==
Grahn made his debut for the Sweden U21 national team in 2001. He made his first appearance for the full national side during January 2001 in a 0–0 draw with the Faroe Islands.

== Career statistics ==
=== International ===
Appearances and goals by national team and year
National team	Year	Apps	Goals
Sweden	2001	1	0
Sweden	2002	0	0
Sweden	2003	3	1
Total		4	1

Scores and results list Sweden's goal tally first, score column indicates score after each Grahn goal.

List of international goals scored by Tobias Grahn
No.	Date	Venue	Opponent	Score	Result	Competition	Ref.
1	22 February 2003	National Stadium, Bangkok, Thailand	North Korea	2–0	4–0	2003 King's Cup	

== Honours ==
Vålerenga

- Norwegian Football Cup: 2002

Malmö FF

- Allsvenskan: 2004

Sweden

- King's Cup: 2003
