= Hong Yong-jo =

North Korean footballer (born 1982)

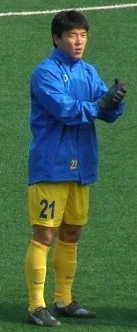

Personal information
- Date of birth: 22 May 1982 (age 44)
- Place of birth: Pyongyang, North Korea
- Height: 1.74 m (5 ft 9 in)
- Position: Midfielder

Senior career*
Years	Team	Apps	(Gls)
2004–2007	25 April		
2008	Bežanija	7	(1)
2008–2010	Rostov	31	(3)
2011–2012	25 April		

International career
2002–2011	North Korea	51	(13)
- * Club domestic league appearances and goals

- Hong Yong-jo
- Hangul: 홍영조
- Hanja: 洪映早
- RR: Hong Yeongjo
- MR: Hong Yŏngjo

Hong Yong-jo (Korean: 홍영조; born 22 May 1982) is a North Korean former footballer who played as a midfielder. He captained North Korea at the 2010 FIFA World Cup in South Africa.

Hong is one of the few North Korean footballers to ever play abroad, having had spells in Russia and Serbia.

== Career statistics ==
=== Club ===
Season	Team	Country	Division	Apps	Goals
2004	April 25	North Korea	1		
2005	April 25	North Korea	1		
2006	April 25	North Korea	1		
2007	April 25	North Korea	1		
07/08	FK Bežanija	Serbia	1	7	1
2008	FC Rostov	Russia	2	16	2
2009	FC Rostov	Russia	1	14	1
2010	FC Rostov	Russia	1	1	0

=== International goals ===
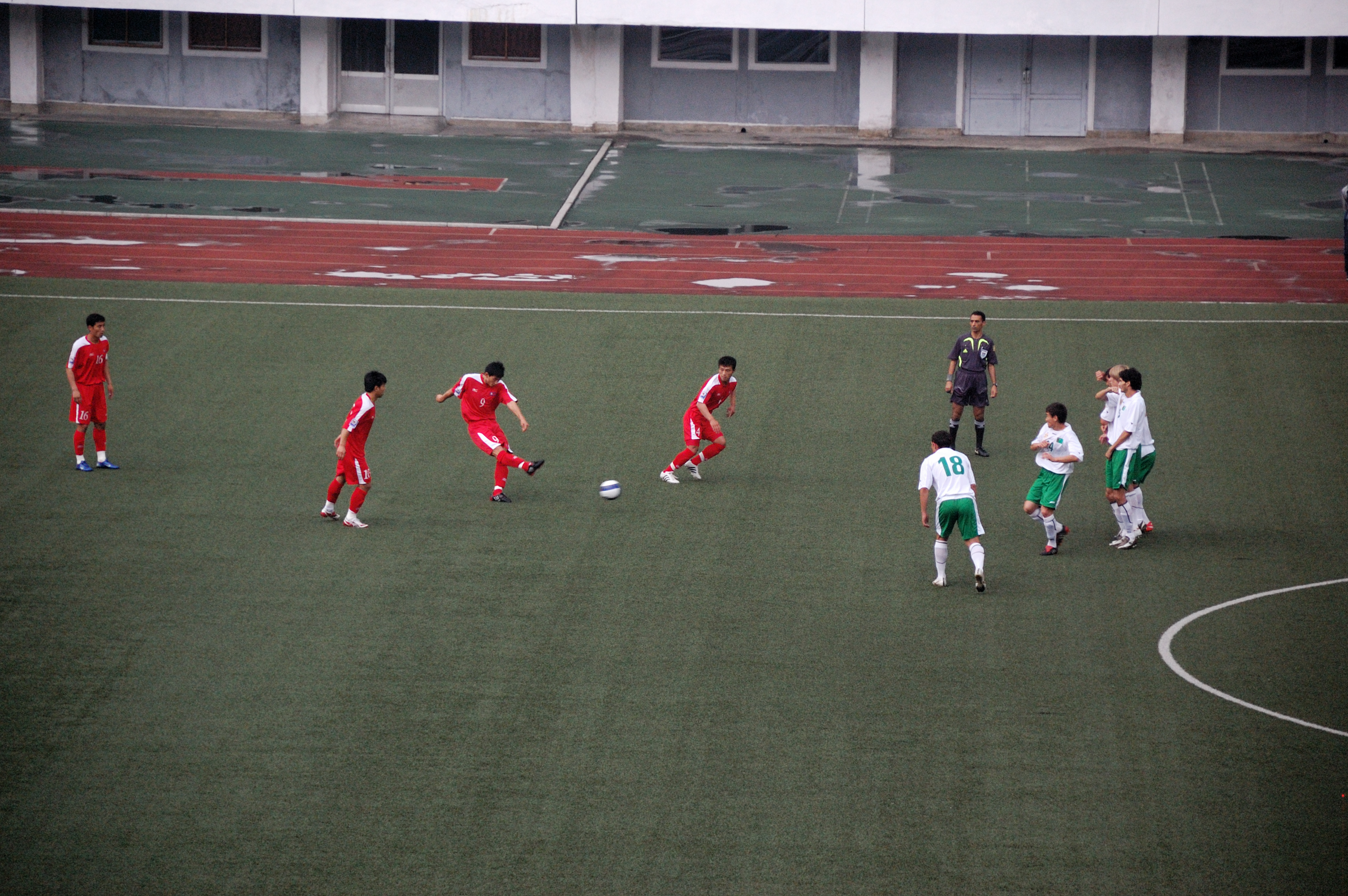
Hong (number 10) with North Korea against Turkmenistan in 2008

#	Date	Venue	Opponent	Score	Result	Competition
1	18 February 2004	Sana'a, Yemen	Yemen	1–1	Drew	2006 FIFA World Cup qualification
2	9 June 2004	Bangkok, Thailand	Thailand	4–1	Won	2006 FIFA World Cup qualification
3	8 September 2004	Pyongyang, North Korea	Thailand	4–1	Won	2006 FIFA World Cup qualification
4	13 October 2004	Pyongyang, North Korea	Yemen	2–1	Won	2006 FIFA World Cup qualification
5	7 March 2005	Taipei, Taiwan	Mongolia	6–0	Won	East Asian Cup 2005 qualification
6	11 March 2005	Taipei, Taiwan	Guam	21–0	Won	East Asian Cup 2005 qualification
7	11 March 2005	Taipei, Taiwan	Guam	21–0	Won	East Asian Cup 2005 qualification
8	28 December 2005	Phuket, Thailand	Thailand	2–0	Won	Friendly
9	30 December 2005	Phuket, Thailand	Latvia	1–2	Lost	Friendly
10	6 February 2008	Amman, Jordan	Jordan	1–0	Won	2010 FIFA World Cup qualification
11	14 June 2008	Pyongyang, North Korea	Jordan	2–0	Won	2010 FIFA World Cup qualification
12	14 June 2008	Pyongyang, North Korea	Jordan	2–0	Won	2010 FIFA World Cup qualification
13	10 September 2008	Shanghai, China	South Korea	1–1	Drew	2010 FIFA World Cup qualification
