= Football at the 2003 SEA Games =

2003 Southeast Asian Games Men's Football
Tournament details
- Host country: Vietnam
- Dates: 30 November – 12 December
- Teams: 8
- Venues: 6 (in 2 host cities)

Final positions
- Champions: Thailand (11th title)
- Runners-up: Vietnam
- Third place: Malaysia
- Fourth place: Myanmar

Tournament statistics
- Matches played: 16
- Goals scored: 61 (3.81 per match)
- Top scorer: (Thailand) Sarayoot Chaikamdee (9 goals)

The football tournament at the 2003 SEA Games was held from 30 November to 12 December in Hanoi, Ho Chi Minh City, Hai Phong and Nam Định of Vietnam. The men's tournament was played by U-23 (under 23 years old) national teams, while the women's tournament had no age limit.

== Venues ==
Hanoi	Hanoi	Ho Chi Minh City	Ho Chi Minh City	Nam Định
Mỹ Đình National Stadium	Hàng Đẫy Stadium	Thống Nhất Stadium	Army Stadium	Thiên Trường Stadium
21°1′14″N 105°45′49.7″E	21°1′47″N 105°49′59″E	10°45′39″N 106°39′48″E	10°48′6″N 106°40′2″E	20°26′11″N 106°10′48″E
Capacity: 40,192	Capacity: 22,000	Capacity: 25,000	Capacity: 25,000	Capacity: 30,000

== Medal winners ==
Division	Gold	Silver	Bronze
Men's Division	Thailand	Vietnam	Malaysia
Women's Division	Vietnam	Myanmar	Thailand

== Men's tournament ==
=== Participants ===
- Cambodia
- Indonesia
- Laos
- Malaysia
- Myanmar
- Singapore
- Thailand
- Vietnam

All times are Indochina Time (UTC+7)

=== Group stage ===
==== Group A ====
Team	Pld	W	D	L	GF	GA	GD	Pts
Thailand	3	2	1	0	13	1	+12	7
Vietnam	3	2	1	0	3	1	+2	7
Indonesia	3	1	0	2	1	7	−6	3
Laos	3	0	0	3	0	8	−8	0

30 November 2003
15:00

Indonesia	1–0	Laos
Bambang 12'	Report

Mỹ Đình National Stadium, Hanoi
Referee: Võ Minh Trí (Vietnam)
30 November 2003
17:30

Thailand	1–1	Vietnam
Datsakorn 81'	Report	Phạm Văn Quyến 55'

Mỹ Đình National Stadium, Hanoi
Attendance: 40,000

4 December 2003
15:00

Laos	0–6	Thailand
	Report	Sarayuth 2', 23', 25', 29'; Rungroj 69'; Teeratep 90'

Hàng Đẫy Stadium, Hanoi
4 December 2003
17:30

Vietnam	1–0	Indonesia
Phan Thanh Bình 34'	Report

Hàng Đẫy Stadium, Hanoi
Referee: Yang Chun (Chinese Taipei)

7 December 2003
17:00

Indonesia	0–6	Thailand
	Report	Rungroj 23'; Sarayuth 28', 70'; Datsakorn 66'; Piyawat 69'; Pichitphong 86'

Thiên Trường Stadium, Nam Định
7 December 2003
17:00

Vietnam	1–0	Laos
Lê Công Vinh 40'	Report

Hàng Đẫy Stadium, Hanoi

==== Group B ====
Team	Pld	W	D	L	GF	GA	GD	Pts
Malaysia	3	3	0	0	13	3	+10	9
Myanmar	3	2	0	1	10	3	+7	6
Singapore	3	1	0	2	5	5	0	3
Cambodia	3	0	0	3	2	19	−17	0

29 November 2003
15:00

Malaysia	8–1	Cambodia
Yosri 16'; Indra Putra 45'; Akmal 49', 51', 80'; Juzaili 58'; Rajan 68', 76'	Report	Kanyanith 86'

Thống Nhất Stadium, Ho Chi Minh City
Attendance: 10,000
Referee: Dương Văn Hiền (Vietnam)
29 November 2003
17:30

Myanmar	2–0	Singapore
Soe Myat Min 33'; Htay Aung 64'	Report

Thống Nhất Stadium, Ho Chi Minh City
Attendance: 8,000
Referee: Chaiwat Kunsuta (Thailand)

3 December 2003
15:00

Singapore	0–2	Malaysia
	Report	Rajan 58'; Akmal 83'

Thống Nhất Stadium, Ho Chi Minh City
3 December 2003
17:30

Cambodia	0–6	Myanmar
	Report	Kyaw Thura 9'; Soe Myat Min 28', 42', 61'; Tint Naing Tun Thein 73'; Aung Kyaw Moe 89'

Thống Nhất Stadium, Ho Chi Minh City

6 December 2003
15:00

Myanmar	2–3	Malaysia
Kyaw Thura 69'; Soe Myat Min 89'	Report	Akmal 35'; Juzaili 72'; Indra Putra 77'

Thống Nhất Stadium, Ho Chi Minh City
6 December 2003
15:00

Cambodia	1–5	Singapore
Virath 60'	Report	Masrezwan 25', 65'; Alam Shah 67', 70', 74'

Army Stadium, Ho Chi Minh City

=== Knockout stage ===
Semi-finals
9 December
Thailand	2
Myanmar	0
9 December
Vietnam	4
Malaysia	3

Final
12 December
Thailand (g.g.)	2
Vietnam	1
Third place
12 December
Malaysia (p)	1 (4)
Myanmar	1 (2)

==== Semi-finals ====
9 December 2003
16:00

Thailand	2–0	Myanmar
Sarayuth 31', 68'	Report

Mỹ Đình National Stadium, Hanoi

9 December 2003
19:00

Vietnam	4–3	Malaysia
Lê Quốc Vượng 26'; Phạm Văn Quyến 50', 79'; Phan Thanh Bình 90+1'	Report	Syamsuri 73'; Zainizam 85'; Indra 87'

Mỹ Đình National Stadium, Hanoi
Attendance: 40,000

==== Bronze medal match ====
12 December 2003
16:30

(bronze) Malaysia	1–1 (a.e.t.)	Myanmar
Rizal 50'	Report	Khin Maung Tun 8'
Penalties
Yosri (penalty scored); Haris (penalty scored); Indra (penalty scored); Akmal (penalty scored)	4–2	(penalty scored) Soe Myat Min; (penalty missed) Yan Paing; (penalty missed) Zaw Linn Tun; (penalty scored) Aung Kyaw Moe

Mỹ Đình National Stadium, Hanoi

==== Gold medal match ====
12 December 2003
19:00

(gold) Thailand	2–1 (a.e.t./g.g.)	Vietnam (silver)
Sarayuth 32'; Nattaporn 96'	Report	Phạm Văn Quyến 90+1'

Mỹ Đình National Stadium, Hanoi
Attendance: 40,000

=== Winners ===
2003 SEA Games Men's Tournament
(Thailand)
Thailand
Eleventh title

=== Goalscorers ===
9 goals:

- (Thailand) Sarayuth Chaikamdee

6 goals:

- (Malaysia) Akmal Rizal Ahmad Rakhli
- (Myanmar) Soe Myat Min

4 goals:

- (Vietnam) Phạm Văn Quyến

3 goals:

- (Malaysia) Indra Putra Mahayuddin
- (Malaysia) K. Rajan
- (Singapore) Mohd Noh Alam Shah

2 goals:

- (Malaysia) Juzaili Samion
- (Myanmar) Kyaw Thura
- (Singapore) Masrezwan Masturi
- (Thailand) Rungroj Sawangsri
- (Thailand) Datsakorn Thonglao
- (Vietnam) Phan Thanh Bình

1 goal:

- (Cambodia) Chea Virath
- (Cambodia) Ung Kanyanith
- (Indonesia) Bambang Pamungkas
- (Malaysia) Syamsuri Mustafa
- (Malaysia) Yosri Derma Raju
- (Malaysia) Zainizam Marjan
- (Myanmar) Aung Kyaw Moe
- (Myanmar) Htay Aung
- (Myanmar) Khin Maung Tun
- (Myanmar) Tint Naing Tun Thein
- (Thailand) Nattaporn Phanrit
- (Thailand) Pichitphong Choeichiu
- (Thailand) Piyawat Thongman
- (Thailand) Teeratep Winothai
- (Vietnam) Lê Công Vinh
- (Vietnam) Lê Quốc Vượng

=== Final ranking ===
Pos	Team	Pld	W	D	L	GF	GA	GD	Pts	Final result
1	Thailand	5	4	1	0	17	2	+15	13	Gold Medal
2	Vietnam (H)	5	3	1	1	8	6	+2	10	Silver Medal
3	Malaysia	5	3	1	1	17	8	+9	10	Bronze Medal
4	Myanmar	5	2	1	2	11	6	+5	7	Fourth place
5	Singapore	3	1	0	2	5	5	0	3	Eliminated in group stage
6	Indonesia	3	1	0	2	1	7	−6	3	Eliminated in group stage
7	Laos	3	0	0	3	0	8	−8	0	Eliminated in group stage
8	Cambodia	3	0	0	3	2	19	−17	0	Eliminated in group stage

(H) Hosts

== Women's tournament ==
=== Participants ===
- Indonesia
- Malaysia
- Myanmar
- Philippines
- Singapore
- Thailand
- Vietnam

All times are Indochina Time (UTC+7)

=== Group stage ===
==== Group A ====
Team	Pld	W	D	L	GF	GA	GD	Pts
Vietnam	3	3	0	0	12	1	+11	9
Malaysia	3	0	2	1	3	5	−2	2
Philippines	3	0	2	1	1	4	−3	2
Indonesia	3	0	2	1	3	9	−6	2

2 December 2003
15:00

Philippines	0–0	Malaysia
	Report

Lạch Tray Stadium, Hai Phong
2 December 2003
17:30

Vietnam	6–0	Indonesia
Lưu Ngọc Mai 9', 10', 22', 42'; Phùng Minh Nguyệt 18'; Văn Thị Thanh 32'	Report

Lạch Tray Stadium, Hai Phong

4 December 2003
15:00

Indonesia	1–1	Philippines
Yansip 39'	Report	Gusriwati 17' (o.g.)

Lạch Tray Stadium, Hai Phong
4 December 2003
17:30

Malaysia	1–3	Vietnam
Norlelawati 77'	Report	Văn Thị Thanh 55'; Đoàn Thị Kim Chi 59'; Nguyễn Thị Mai Lan 65'

Lạch Tray Stadium, Hai Phong

6 December 2003
15:00

Indonesia	2–2	Malaysia
Pakage 7'; Yansip 37'		Ahing 45'; Norlelawati 48'

Lạch Tray Stadium, Hai Phong
6 December 2003
15:00

Vietnam	3–0	Philippines
Nguyễn Thị Hà 3'; Phạm Quỳnh Anh 25'; Đỗ Thị Phượng 53'

Lạch Tray Stadium, Hai Phong

==== Group B ====
Team	Pld	W	D	L	GF	GA	GD	Pts
Myanmar	2	2	0	0	7	2	+5	6
Thailand	2	1	0	1	4	4	0	3
Singapore	2	0	0	2	0	5	−5	0

2 December 2003
17:00

Thailand	2–4	Myanmar
Kaeobaen 6'; Takonrum 48'	Report	Aye Nandar Hlaing 17', 73'; Zin Mar Wann 65'; San San Kyu 78'

Thiên Trường Stadium, Nam Định

4 December 2003
17:00

Myanmar	3–0	Singapore
My Nilar Htwe 14'; Aye Nandar Hlaing 69'; Nhin Si Myint 88'

Thiên Trường Stadium, Nam Định

6 December 2003
17:30

Singapore	0–2	Thailand
		Takonrum 32'; Phanlet 50'

Thiên Trường Stadium, Nam Định

=== Knockout stage ===
Semi-finals
8 December
Myanmar	8
Malaysia	0
8 December
Vietnam	3
Thailand	1

Final
11 December
Vietnam	2
Myanmar	1
Third place
11 December
Thailand	6
Malaysia	1

==== Semi-finals ====
8 December 2003
15:00

Myanmar	8–0	Malaysia
San San Kyu 19', 24'; Zin Mar Wann 28', 41'; Aye Nandar Hlaing 34'; Nwe Nwe Toe 36'; Hla Hla Than 55'; Nhin Si Miynt 72'

Lạch Tray Stadium, Hai Phong

8 December 2003
18:00

Vietnam	3–1	Thailand
Lưu Ngọc Mai 6'; Phùng Minh Nguyệt 36'; Saipin 49' (o.g.)	Report	Piamsin 63'

Lạch Tray Stadium, Hai Phong

==== Bronze medal match ====
11 December 2003
15:00

(bronze) Thailand	6–1	Malaysia
Phanlet 4', 21', 42', 50'; Piamsin 7', 25'	Report	Norlelawati 29'

Lạch Tray Stadium, Hai Phong

==== Gold medal match ====
11 December 2003
17:30

(gold) Vietnam	2–1	Myanmar (silver)
Văn Thị Thanh 56'; Nguyễn Thị Mai Lan 85'		My Nilar Htwe 69'

Lạch Tray Stadium, Hai Phong

=== Winner ===
2003 SEA Games Women's Tournament

Vietnam
Second title

=== Goalscorers ===
5 goals:

- (Thailand) Chownee Phanlet
- (Vietnam) Lưu Ngọc Mai

4 goals:

- (Myanmar) Aye Nandar Hlaing

3 goals:

- (Malaysia) Norlelawati Ngah
- (Myanmar) San San Kyu
- (Myanmar) Zin Mar Wann
- (Thailand) Narumon Piamsin
- (Vietnam) Văn Thị Thanh

2 goals:

- (Indonesia) Jenny Merlin Yansip
- (Myanmar) My Nilar Htwe
- (Myanmar) Nhin Si Myint
- (Thailand) Chutima Takonrum
- (Vietnam) Phùng Minh Nguyệt
- (Vietnam) Nguyễn Thị Mai Lan

1 goals:

- (Indonesia) Marion Pakage
- (Malaysia) Laini Ahing
- (Myanmar) Nwe Nwe Toe
- (Myanmar) Hla Hla Than
- (Thailand) Supaphon Kaeobaen
- (Vietnam) Đoàn Thị Kim Chi
- (Vietnam) Đỗ Thị Phượng
- (Vietnam) Nguyễn Thị Hà
- (Vietnam) Phạm Quỳnh Anh

Own goal:

- (Indonesia) Gusriwati (For Philippines)
- (Thailand) Pranee Saipin (For Vietnam)

=== Final ranking ===
Pos	Team	Pld	W	D	L	GF	GA	GD	Pts	Final result
1	Vietnam (H)	5	5	0	0	17	3	+14	15	Gold Medal
2	Myanmar	4	3	0	1	16	4	+12	9	Silver Medal
3	Thailand	4	2	0	2	11	8	+3	6	Bronze Medal
4	Malaysia	5	0	2	3	4	19	−15	2	Fourth place
5	Philippines	3	0	2	1	1	4	−3	2	Eliminated in group stage
6	Indonesia	3	0	2	1	3	9	−6	2	Eliminated in group stage
7	Singapore	2	0	0	2	0	5	−5	0	Eliminated in group stage

(H) Hosts

Preceded by 2001	Football at the SEA Games; 2003 SEA Games	Succeeded by 2005
