= Obaidullah Karimi =

Afghan footballer

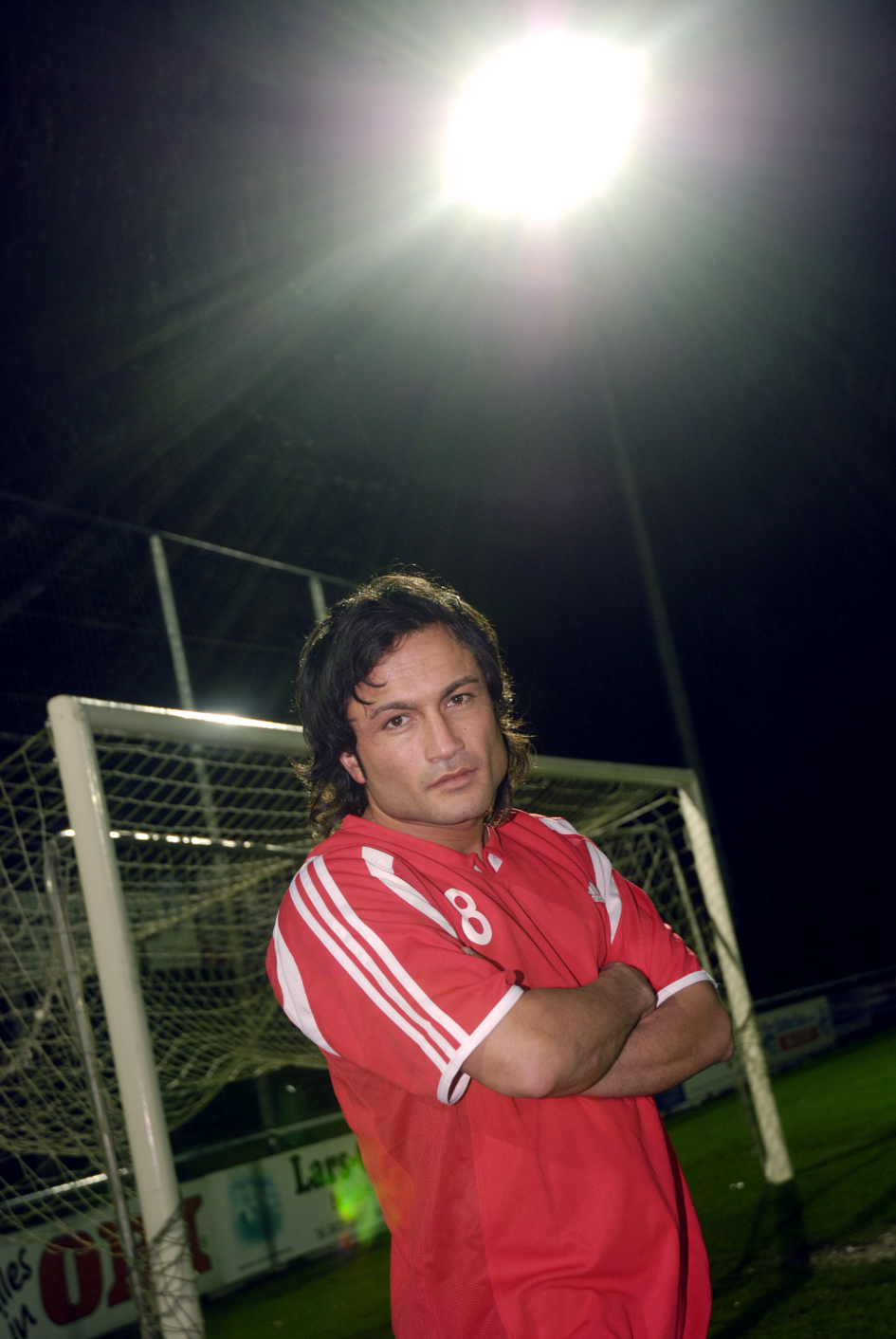
- Karimi in 2008

Personal information
- Date of birth: 21 December 1979 (age 46)
- Place of birth: Kabul, Afghanistan
- Height: 1.70 m (5 ft 7 in)
- Position: Forward

Senior career*
| Years | Team | Apps | (Gls) |
| 2000–2001 | Hamburger SV II | | |
| 2001–2002 | SC Vorwärts-Wacker 04 Billstedt | | |
| 2002–2003 | Altona 93 | 14 | (1) |
| 2003–2004 | SV Lurup | | |
| 2004–2008 | FC Eintracht Norderstedt 03 | | |
| 2008 | SC Concordia von 1907 | 10 | (1) |
| 2009–2011 | Hamm United | | |
| 2011–2012 | HSV Barmbek-Uhlenhorst | | |
| 2012 | Bramfelder SV | | |
| 2013 | SV Uhlenhorst-Adler | | |
| 2013–2014 | TuS Hamburg | | |
| 2014–2015 | Störtebeker SV | | |

International career
| 2003–2008 | Afghanistan | 7 | (1) |
- * Club domestic league appearances and goals

Obaidullah Karimi (Persian: عبیدالله کریمی; born on 21 December 1979) is an Afghan former footballer who played as a forward. He was the first ever Afghan player to score a goal in FIFA World Cup qualification when he scored in the 2010 FIFA World Cup qualification (AFC) against Syria.

In his career, he had four metatarsal fractures.

== Career statistics ==
=== Club ===
Appearances and goals by club, season and competition
| Club | Season | DFB-Pokal | | | National Cup | | Total | |
| Club | Season | Division | Apps | Goals | Apps | Goals | Apps | Goals |
|---|---|---|---|---|---|---|---|---|
| Hamburger SV II | 2000–01 | Oberliga Hamburg/Schleswig-Holstein | | | | | | |
| SC Vorwärts-Wacker 04 Billstedt | 2001–02 | Oberliga Hamburg/Schleswig-Holstein | 3 | 0 | | | | |
| Altona 93 | 2002–03 | Oberliga Hamburg/Schleswig-Holstein | 14 | 1 | | | | |
| SV Lurup | 2003–04 | Oberliga Hamburg/Schleswig-Holstein | 0 | 0 | | | | |
| FC Eintracht Norderstedt 03 | 2004–05 | Bezirksliga Hamburg Nord | | | | | | |
| FC Eintracht Norderstedt 03 | 2005–06 | Landesliga Hamburg Hansa-Staffel | | | | | | |
| FC Eintracht Norderstedt 03 | 2006–07 | Oberliga Hamburg | 3 | 1 | | | | |
| FC Eintracht Norderstedt 03 | 2007–08 | Oberliga Hamburg | 1 | 0 | | | | |
| SC Concordia von 1907 | 2008–09 | Oberliga Hamburg | 10 | 1 | | | | |
| Hamm United | 2008–09 | Bezirksliga Hamburg Ost | | | | | | |
| Hamm United | 2009–10 | Landesliga Hamburg Hansa-Staffel | | | | | | |
| Hamm United | 2010–11 | Landesliga Hamburg Hansa-Staffel | | | | | | |
| HSV Barmbek-Uhlenhorst | 2011–12 | Landesliga Hamburg Hansa-Staffel | | | | | | |
| Bramfelder SV | 2012–13 | Oberliga Hamburg | | | - | | | |
| Career total | | | | | | | | |

=== International ===
Appearances and goals by national team and year
| National team | Year | Apps | Goals |
|---|---|---|---|
| Afghanistan | 2003 | 3 | 0 |
| Afghanistan | 2004 | 0 | 0 |
| Afghanistan | 2005 | 0 | 0 |
| Afghanistan | 2006 | 0 | 0 |
| Afghanistan | 2007 | 2 | 1 |
| Afghanistan | 2008 | 2 | 0 |
| Total | | 7 | 1 |

Scores and results list Afghanistan's goal tally first, score column indicates score after each Karimi goal.

List of international goals scored by Obaidullah Karimi
| No. | Date | Venue | Opponent | Score | Result | Competition |
|---|---|---|---|---|---|---|
| 1 | 26 October 2007 | Dushanbe, Tajikistan | Syria | 1–0 | 1–2 | 2010 FIFA World Cup qualification (AFC) |
