= Josh Borja =

American-born Guamanian soccer player (born 1990)

Joshua Andrew Borja
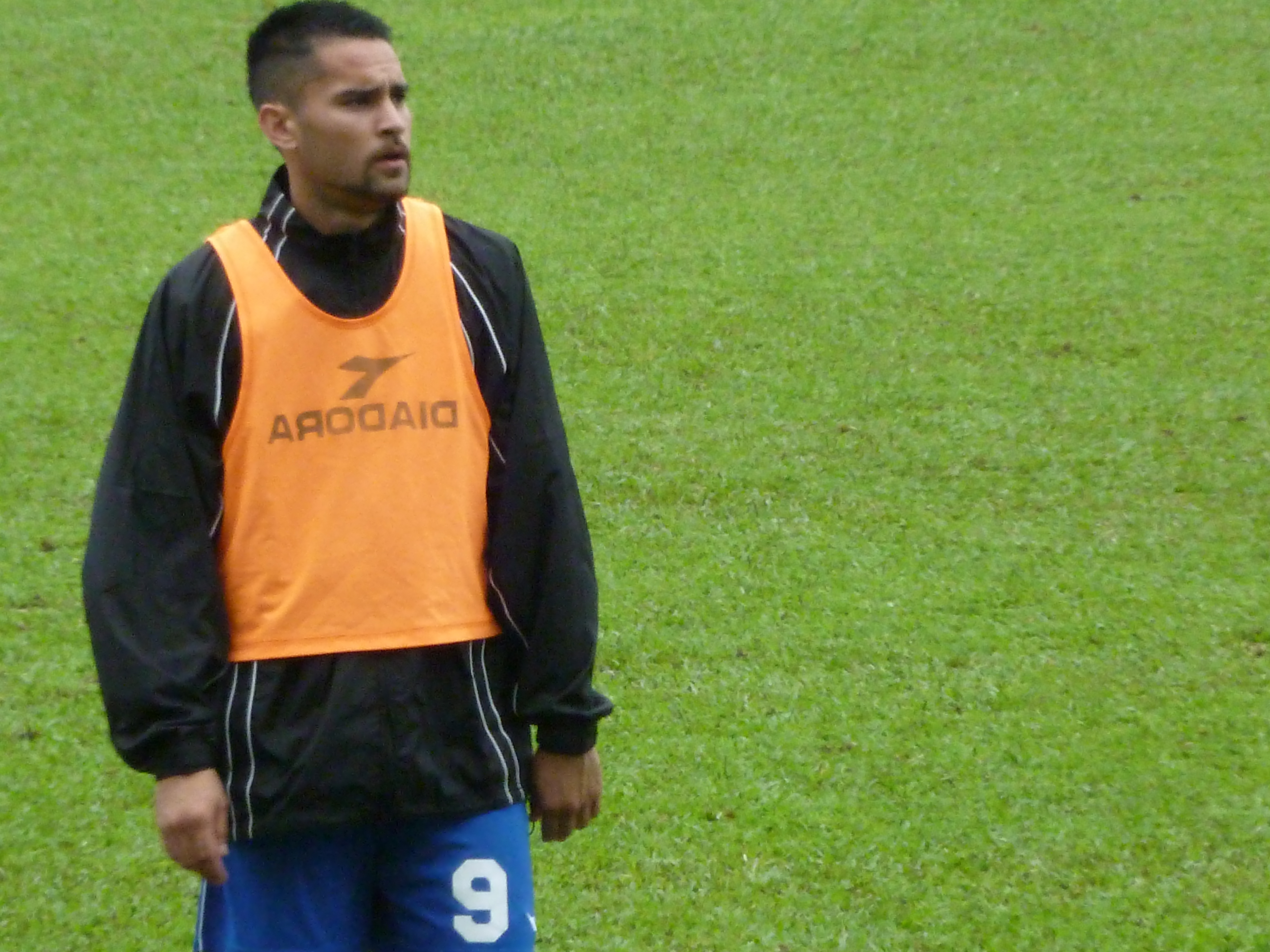

Personal information
- Full name: Joshua Andrew Borja
- Date of birth: August 1, 1990 (age 36)
- Place of birth: San Diego, United States
- Position: Defender

Youth career
- –2007: Albion SC
- 2009: Los Angeles Galaxy

College career
Years	Team	Apps	(Gls)
2009–2010	Chico State Wildcats	38	(1)

Senior career*
Years	Team	Apps	(Gls)
2011	Orange County Blue Star	0	(0)
2012–2020	SoCal Elite		

International career
2009–2013	Guam	15	(5)
- * Club domestic league appearances and goals

Joshua Andrew Borja (born August 1, 1990) is an American-born Guamanian former soccer player who played as a defender.

== Club career ==
Borja started with soccer at Albion SC in San Diego and played for the youth team until 2007.

He then played in the U.S. Development Academy with the Los Angeles Galaxy U‑18s in 2009. While in high school, he also competed on the varsity soccer team as a freshman for the West Hills Wolf Pack and was a four‑year varsity player at West Hills High School in Santee, San Diego County, California. He joined Chico State Wildcats after graduating in 2009 and he scored once in two seasons.

After college, he joined USL Premier Development League club Orange County Blue Star for the 2011 season without making a single appearance. He then joined SoCal Elite in spring 2012, where he would play until retiring in 2020.

== International career ==
He has been capped fifteen times for the Guam national football team and played from 2009 to 2013. He was first called up to represent Guam during 2010 East Asian Football Championship, and he debuted during the 1–0 victory against Mongolia on 11 March 2009. He scored all five of his goals for Guam during this tournament.

He also played at the 2013 EAFF East Asian Cup before retiring after a 2–0 friendly win against Cambodia on 19 November 2013.

== Career statistics ==
=== Club ===
Appearances and goals by club, season and competition
Club	Season	League		
Club	Season	Division	Apps	Goals
Chico State Wildcats	2009	N/A	18	1
Chico State Wildcats	2010	N/A	20	0
Orange County Blue Star	2011	PDL Southwest Division	0	0
Career total			38	1

=== International ===
Appearances and goals by national team and year
National team	Year	Apps	Goals
Guam	2009	6	5
Guam	2010	0	0
Guam	2011	0	0
Guam	2012	8	0
Guam	2013	1	0
Total		15	5

Scores and results list Guam's goal tally first, score column indicates score after each Borja goal.

List of international goals scored by Josh Borja
No.	Date	Venue	Cap	Opponent	Score	Result	Competition
1	13 March 2009	Leo Palace Resort, Yona, Guam	2	Northern Mariana Islands	2–0	2–1	2010 East Asian Football Championship qualification
2	15 March 2009	Leo Palace Resort, Yona, Guam	3	Macau	2–2	2–2	2010 East Asian Football Championship qualification
3	23 August 2009	World Games Stadium, Kaohsiung, Taiwan	4	North Korea	1–0	2–9	2010 East Asian Football Championship qualification
4	25 August 2009	World Games Stadium, Kaohsiung, Taiwan	5	Chinese Taipei	1–0	2–4	2010 East Asian Football Championship qualification
5.	25 August 2009	World Games Stadium, Kaohsiung, Taiwan	5	Chinese Taipei	2–0	2–4	2010 East Asian Football Championship qualification

== Honours ==
Orange County Blue Star

- PDL Southwest Division: third place 2011
