= Kim Myong-won (footballer) =

North Korean footballer (born 1983)

Personal information
- Date of birth: 15 July 1983 (age 43)
- Place of birth: Pyongyang, North Korea
- Height: 1.80 m (5 ft 11 in)
- Position: Striker

Senior career*
Years	Team	Apps	(Gls)
2003–2011	Amrokgang	112	(45)
2011–2013	FC Ulaanbaatar	115	(76)

International career
2003–2010	North Korea	14	(1)
- * Club domestic league appearances and goals as of 5 May 2012

- Kim Myong-won
- Hangul: 김명원
- Hanja: 金明元
- RR: Gim Myeongwon
- MR: Kim Myŏngwŏn

Kim Myong-won (Korean: 김명원; born 15 July 1983) is a North Korean professional footballer who plays as a striker.

== International career ==
Kim has played on nine occasions for the North Korean national team since his first appearance in 2003, and has been called up to their 23-man squad for the 2010 FIFA World Cup. Kim Myong-won was registered as one of his team's three goalkeepers—as per tournament rules, all squads must nominate three eligible keepers. FIFA ruled, however, that because of his registration, Kim Myong-won would only be allowed to play as a goalkeeper, and not as an outfield player as had originally been intended. It has also been reported that he actually played as a goalkeeper for his club at least once.

== Career statistics ==
=== International ===
Appearances and goals by national team and year
National team	Year	Apps	Goals
North Korea	2003	5	1
North Korea	2004	–	
North Korea	2005	–	
North Korea	2006	–	
North Korea	2007	–	
North Korea	2008	5	0
North Korea	2009	3	0
North Korea	2010	1	0
Total		14	1

Scores and results list North Korea's goal tally first, score column indicates score after each Kim goal.

List of international goals scored by Kim Myong-won
No.	Date	Venue	Opponent	Score	Result	Competition
1	16 February 2003	Supachalasai Stadium, Bangkok, Thailand	Thailand	2–2	2–2	2003 King's Cup
