= 2010 East Asian Football Championship =

東アジアサッカー選手権2010

Tournament details
- Host country: Japan
- City: Tokyo
- Dates: 6–14 February
- Teams: 10 (from 2 confederations)
- Venues: 2 (in 1 host city)

Final positions
- Champions: China (2nd title)
- Runners-up: South Korea
- Third place: Japan
- Fourth place: Hong Kong

Tournament statistics
- Matches played: 6
- Goals scored: 17 (2.83 per match)
- Attendance: 69,423 (11,571 per match)
- Top scorer(s): (China) Qu Bo (South Korea) Lee Dong-gook (South Korea) Lee Seung-ryul (Japan) Keiji Tamada (2 goals each)
- Best player: (China) Du Wei
- Best goalkeeper: (China) Yang Zhi

The 2010 EAFF East Asian Football Championship was the fourth edition of the tournament which was held between 6 and 14 February 2010. Two preliminary competitions were held during 2009.

== Participating teams ==
=== Preliminary ===
==== Round 1 ====
- Guam
- Northern Mariana Islands
- Mongolia
- Macau

==== Round 2 ====
- Chinese Taipei
- Guam – Winner of Preliminary Competition
- Hong Kong
- North Korea

=== Finals ===
- China – 2008 East Asian Football Championship Third Place
- Hong Kong – Winner of Semifinal Competition
- Japan – 2010 FIFA World Cup participating team
- South Korea – 2010 FIFA World Cup participating team

== Preliminary Competition ==
=== Round 1 ===
The first round of preliminary competition was hosted by Guam. The winner of the group advanced to the Round 2 of preliminary competition.

==== Matches ====
- All times listed are Chamorro Standard Time (ChST) – UTC+10

Team	Pld	W	D	L	GF	GA	GD	Pts
Guam	3	2	1	0	5	3	+2	7
Mongolia	3	2	0	1	6	3	+3	6
Macau	3	1	1	1	9	5	+4	4
Northern Mariana Islands	3	0	0	3	3	12	−9	0

11 March 2009
13:30

Macau	6–1	Northern Mariana Islands
Chan Kin Seng 13', 24'; Ho Man Hou 33', 90'; Chong In Leong 40'; Loi Wai Hong 62'	Report	Miller 5'

Leo Palace Resort, Yona
Referee: Ryuji Sato (Japan)
11 March 2009
16:00

Guam	1–0	Mongolia
Mendiola 9'	Report

Leo Palace Resort, Yona
Referee: Kim Jong-Hyeok (Korea Republic)

13 March 2009
13:30

Macau	1–2	Mongolia
Ho Man Hou 79'	Report	Tsedenbal 67'; Lkhümbengarav 69'

Leo Palace Resort, Yona
Referee: Fan Qi (China)
13 March 2009
16:00

Guam	2–1	Northern Mariana Islands
Borja 10'; Mariano 68'	Report	Loken 81' (pen.)

Leo Palace Resort, Yona
Attendance: 765
Referee: Cheng Oi Cho (Hong Kong)

15 March 2009
13:30

Northern Mariana Islands	1–4	Mongolia
Swaim 74' (pen.)	Report	Lkhümbengarav 16'; Sukhbaatar 42'; Tsedenbal 71'; Mungunsukh 90'

Leo Palace Resort, Yona
Attendance: 700
Referee: Ryuji Sato (Japan)
15 March 2009
16:00

Guam	2–2	Macau
Borja 36'; Cunliffe 90'	Report	Chan Kin Seng 10', 51'

Leo Palace Resort, Yona
Attendance: 1,400
Referee: Kim Jong-Hyeok (Korea Republic)

==== Awards ====
Best Goalkeeper	Best Defender	Top Scorer	Most Valuable Player	Fairplay Award
(Guam) Brett Maluwelmeng	(Mongolia) Chimeddorj Mönkhbat	(Macau) Chan Kin Seng	(Guam) Jason Cunliffe	Northern Mariana Islands

=== Round 2 ===
The second round of preliminary competition was held in Kaohsiung, Taiwan. The winner of the group advanced to the Finals.

==== Matches ====
- All times listed are National Standard Time (NST) – UTC+8

Team	Pld	W	D	L	GF	GA	GD	Pts
Hong Kong	3	2	1	0	16	0	+16	7
North Korea	3	2	1	0	11	3	+8	7
Chinese Taipei	3	1	0	2	5	8	−3	3
Guam	3	0	0	3	4	25	−21	0

23 August 2009
16:30

North Korea	9–2	Guam
Kim Yong-jun 8'; Pak Nam-chol I 12'; An Chol-hyok 20', 74', 78', 89'; Choe Kum-chol 28', 41'; Mun In-guk 45+2'	Report	Borja 1'; Cunliffe 19'

World Games Stadium, Kaohsiung
Attendance: 2,000
Referee: Hajime Matsuo (Japan)
23 August 2009
19:00

Chinese Taipei	0–4	Hong Kong
	Report	Lee Wai Lim 38'; Chan Wai Ho 45+1'; Chan Siu Ki 60'; Guy 63'

World Games Stadium, Kaohsiung
Attendance: 12,000
Referee: Minoru Tojo (Japan)

25 August 2009
16:30

Hong Kong	0–0	North Korea
	Report

World Games Stadium, Kaohsiung
Attendance: 100
Referee: Kim Jong-Hyeok (Korea Republic)
25 August 2009
19:00

Chinese Taipei	4–2	Guam
Chen Po-Liang 45', 68'; Chang Han 61'; Lo Chih-En 75'	Report	Borja 5', 26'

World Games Stadium, Kaohsiung
Attendance: 7,500
Referee: Hajime Matsuo (Japan)

27 August 2009
16:30

Hong Kong	12–0	Guam
Man Pei Tak 5'; Wong Chin Hung 15'; Chan Siu Ki 18', 35', 75', 77'; Chao Pengfei 37', 71', 90+2'; Leung Chun Pong 41'; Poon Yiu Cheuk 89'; Chan Wai Ho 90'	Report

World Games Stadium, Kaohsiung
Attendance: 1,500
Referee: Minoru Tojo (Japan)
27 August 2009
19:00

Chinese Taipei	1–2	North Korea
Chang Han 49'	Report	Jong Tae-se 23' (pen.); Ji Yun-nam 61'

World Games Stadium, Kaohsiung
Attendance: 10,000
Referee: Hajime Matsuo (Japan)

==== Awards ====
Best Goalkeeper	Best Defender	Top Scorer	Most Valuable Player	Fairplay Award
(Hong Kong) Ho Kwok Chuen	(North Korea) Ri Kwang-chon	(Hong Kong) Chan Siu Ki	(Hong Kong) Gerard Ambassa Guy	North Korea

== Final round ==
=== Results and matches ===
The final competition was held in Japan.

- All times listed are Japan Standard Time (JST) – UTC+9

Team	Pld	W	D	L	GF	GA	GD	Pts
China	3	2	1	0	5	0	+5	7
South Korea	3	2	0	1	8	4	+4	6
Japan	3	1	1	1	4	3	+1	4
Hong Kong	3	0	0	3	0	10	−10	0

6 February 2010
19:15

Japan	0–0	China
	Report

Tokyo Stadium, Tokyo
Attendance: 25,964
Referee: Strebre Delovski (Australia)
7 February 2010
19:15

South Korea	5–0	Hong Kong
Kim Jung-woo 10'; Koo Ja-cheol 24'; Lee Dong-gook 32'; Lee Seung-ryul 37'; No Byung-jun 90+3'	Report

National Stadium, Tokyo
Attendance: 2,728
Referee: Ryuji Sato (Japan)

10 February 2010
19:15

China	3–0	South Korea
Yu Hai 5'; Gao Lin 27'; Deng Zhuoxiang 60'	Report

Tokyo Stadium, Tokyo
Attendance: 3,629
Referee: Ng Kai Lam (Hong Kong)
11 February 2010
19:15

Japan	3–0	Hong Kong
Tamada 41', 82'; Tanaka 65'	Report

National Stadium, Tokyo
Attendance: 16,368
Referee: Zhao Liang (China PR)

14 February 2010
16:30

Hong Kong	0–2	China
	Report	Qu Bo 44', 74' (pen.)

National Stadium, Tokyo
Attendance: 16,439
Referee: Kim Jong-Hyeok (Korea Republic)
14 February 2010
19:15

Japan	1–3	South Korea
Endō 23' (pen.)	Report	Lee Dong-gook 33' (pen.); Lee Seung-ryul 39'; Kim Jae-sung 70'

National Stadium, Tokyo
Attendance: 42,951
Referee: Strebre Delovski (Australia)

=== Awards ===
Best Goalkeeper	Best Defender	Top Scorer	Most Valuable Player	Fairplay Award
(China) Yang Zhi	(South Korea) Cho Yong-hyung	(China) Qu Bo (South Korea) Lee Dong-gook (South Korea) Lee Seung-ryul (Japan) Keiji Tamada	(China) Du Wei	Hong Kong

== Goalscorers ==
There were 17 goals scored in 6 matches, for an average of 2.83 goals per match.

2 goals

- (China) Qu Bo
- (Japan) Keiji Tamada
- (South Korea) Lee Dong-gook
- (South Korea) Lee Seung-yeoul

1 goal

- (China) Deng Zhuoxiang
- (China) Gao Lin
- (China) Yu Hai
- (Japan) Marcus Tulio Tanaka
- (Japan) Yasuhito Endō
- (South Korea) Kim Jae-sung
- (South Korea) Kim Jung-woo
- (South Korea) Koo Ja-cheol
- (South Korea) No Byung-jun

== Final standing ==
Rank	Team
1	China
2	South Korea
3	Japan
4	Hong Kong
5	North Korea
6	Chinese Taipei
7	Guam
8	Mongolia
9	Macau
10	Northern Mariana Islands
