= Kim Yong-jun (footballer) =

North Korean footballer

Personal information
- Full name: Kim Yong-jun
- Date of birth: 19 July 1983 (age 43)
- Place of birth: Pyongyang, North Korea
- Height: 1.82 m (6 ft 0 in)
- Position: Midfielder

Senior career*
Years	Team	Apps	(Gls)
2002–2006	Pyongyang		
2006–2007	Yanbian FC	27	(6)
2008	Chengdu Blades	4	(0)
2009–2011	Pyongyang		

International career^{‡}
2001–2011	Korea DPR	59	(7)

Managerial career
- 2010–2013: Pyongyang
- 2013–2017: North Korea U16 (assistant)
- 2013–2017: North Korea U17 (assistant)
- 2013–2017: North Korea U23 (assistant)
- 2018–2019: North Korea
- 2019: North Korea (assistant)
- * Club domestic league appearances and goals as of 24 September 2008 ‡ National team caps and goals as of 3 October 2019

- Kim Yong-jun
- Hangul: 김영준
- Hanja: 金永俊
- RR: Gim Yeongjun
- MR: Kim Yŏngjun

Kim Yong-jun (Korean: 김영준; born 19 July 1983) is a North Korean football manager and former player.

== Club career stats ==
Season	Team	Country	Division	Apps	Goals
2006	Yanbian FC	China	2	7	0
2007	Yanbian FC	China	2	20	6
2008	Chengdu Blades	China	1	4	0

== Goals for senior national team ==
#	Date	Venue	Opponent	Score	Result	Competition
	11 March 2005	Taipei, Taiwan	Guam	21–0	Won	2005 East Asian Football Championship qualification
	31 July 2005	Daejeon, South Korea	Japan	1–0	Won	2005 East Asian Football Championship
	23 August 2009	Kaohsiung, Taiwan	Guam	9–2	Won	2010 East Asian Football Championship
