= Football at the 2001 SEA Games =

2001 SEA Games Men's Football
Tournament details
- Host country: Malaysia
- Dates: 1–15 September
- Teams: 9

Final positions
- Champions: Thailand (10th title)
- Runners-up: Malaysia
- Third place: Myanmar
- Fourth place: Indonesia

Tournament statistics
- Matches played: 20
- Goals scored: 63 (3.15 per match)
- Top scorer(s): (Malaysia) Akmal Rizal (Thailand) Manit Noywech (5 goals)

The football tournament at the 2001 SEA Games was held in Kuala Lumpur, Malaysia. It included a men's tournament, and was also the fourth Southeast Asian Games to include a women's tournament, but the first permanently. The men's competition was held from 1 to 15 September 2001, while the women's tournament was held from 4 to 14 September 2001. The men's tournament was the first of the Southeast Asian Games to have an age limit, and has been played by U-23 (under 23 years old) national teams since then, while the women's tournament has no age limit. All matches were held in Kuala Lumpur, Malaysia.

== Venues ==
Kuala Lumpur		Shah Alam	Petaling Jaya
Bukit Jalil National Stadium	Cheras Stadium	Shah Alam Stadium	MPPJ Stadium
Capacity: 100,000	Capacity: 18,000	Capacity: 80,000	Capacity: 25,000

== Medal winners ==
Division	Gold	Silver	Bronze
Men's Division	Thailand	Malaysia	Myanmar
Women's Division	Vietnam	Thailand	Myanmar

== Men's tournament ==
=== Participants ===
- Brunei
- Cambodia
- Indonesia
- Laos
- Malaysia
- Myanmar
- Singapore
- Thailand
- Vietnam

=== Group stage ===
==== Group A ====
Team	Pld	W	D	L	GF	GA	GD	Pts
Thailand	4	4	0	0	12	1	+11	12
Myanmar	4	2	1	1	7	4	+3	7
Singapore	4	2	0	2	10	3	+7	6
Laos	4	1	0	3	2	9	−7	3
Cambodia	4	0	1	3	0	14	−14	1

1 September 2001
17:00

Thailand	7–0	Cambodia
Teeratep 9'; Thonglao 15'; Manit 31', 83', 86'; Narongchai 42'; Jukkpant 65' (pen.)	Report

MBPJ Stadium, Petaling Jaya
Attendance: 100
Referee: Yoshida Toshimitsu (Japan)
1 September 2001
20:45

Singapore	4–0	Laos
Indra Sahdan 49', 72', 90' (pen.); Faizal 61'	Report

MBPJ Stadium, Petaling Jaya
Referee: Halim Abdul Hamid (Malaysia)

3 September 2001
17:00

Thailand	1–0	Singapore
Teeratep 32'	Report

MBPJ Stadium, Petaling Jaya
Referee: Mohd Sukri Mat Amin (Malaysia)
3 September 2001
20:45

Myanmar	0–0	Cambodia
	Report

MBPJ Stadium, Petaling Jaya
Referee: Lương Thế Tài (Vietnam)

5 September 2001
17:00

Myanmar	4–0	Laos
Nay Thu Hlaing 21'; Aung Tun Naing 27', 33'; Tint Naing Tun Thein 52'	Report

MBPJ Stadium, Petaling Jaya
Referee: Mohd Sukri Mat Amin (Malaysia)
5 September 2001
20:45

Cambodia	0–5	Singapore
	Report	Indra Sahdan 8', 60' (pen.); Fadzuhasny 32', 44'; Ratna 50'

MBPJ Stadium, Petaling Jaya
Referee: Halim Abdul Hamid (Malaysia)

7 September 2001
17:00

Myanmar	2–1	Singapore
Aung Tun Naing 42'; Yan Paing 74'	Report	Indra Sahdan 82'

MBPJ Stadium, Petaling Jaya
Referee: Lương Thế Tài (Vietnam)
7 September 2001
20:45

Thailand	1–0	Laos
Hawanchri 9'	Report

MBPJ Stadium, Petaling Jaya
Referee: Yoshida Toshimitsu (Japan)

10 September 2001
17:00

Laos	2–0	Cambodia
Phounsamay 4', 14'	Report

MBPJ Stadium, Petaling Jaya
Referee: U Tun Hla Aung (Malaysia)
10 September 2001
20:45

Thailand	3–1	Myanmar
Manit 39', 61'; Sarawut 74'	Report	Soe Myat Min 12'

MBPJ Stadium, Petaling Jaya
Referee: Lương Thế Tài (Vietnam)

==== Group B ====
Team	Pld	W	D	L	GF	GA	GD	Pts
Malaysia	3	3	0	0	9	1	+8	9
Indonesia	3	2	0	1	11	2	+9	6
Vietnam	3	1	0	2	5	4	+1	3
Brunei	3	0	0	3	1	19	−18	0

2 September 2001
20:45

Malaysia	5–0	Brunei
Indra 38'; Akmal 44', 45', 70'; Nizaruddin 85' (pen.)	Report

MBPJ Stadium, Petaling Jaya
Referee: AGC Deshapriya (Sri Lanka)

4 September 2001
20:45

Vietnam	5–1	Brunei
Thạch Bảo Khanh 10', 52'; Tô Đức Cường 44'; Nguyễn Minh Nghĩa 55'; Nguyễn Quốc Trung 63'	Report	Johari 25'

MBPJ Stadium, Petaling Jaya
Referee: Rungklay Mongkol (Thailand)

6 September 2001
20:45

Indonesia	1–0	Vietnam
Maman 81'	Report

MBPJ Stadium, Petaling Jaya
Referee: R.Vijay (Singapore)

9 September 2001
20:45

Malaysia	2–1	Indonesia
Akmal 69'; Irwan 81'	Report	Maman 49'

MBPJ Stadium, Petaling Jaya
Referee: Yoshida Toshimitsu (Japan)

11 September 2001
20:45

Indonesia	9–0	Brunei
Pamungkas 12', 15', 81'; Elie 13', 63', 65'; Sudarsono 49', 75'; Isnan 59'

MBPJ Stadium, Petaling Jaya
Referee: U Tun Hla Min (Myanmar)
11 September 2001
20:45

Malaysia	2–0	Vietnam
Nidzam 47'; Akmal 85'	Report

Bukit Jalil National Stadium, Kuala Lumpur
Referee: Rungklay Mongkol (Thailand)

=== Knockout stage ===
Semi-finals
13 September
Thailand (g.g.)	2
Indonesia	1
13 September
Malaysia	1
Myanmar	0

Final
15 September
Thailand	1
Malaysia	0
Third place
15 September
Indonesia	0
Myanmar	1

==== Semi-finals ====
13 September 2001
20:45

Thailand	2–1 (a.e.t.)	Indonesia
Kitpongsri 39'; Teeratep 105'	Report	Pamungkas 2'

MBPJ Stadium, Petaling Jaya
Referee: Halim Abdul Hamid (Malaysia)
13 September 2001
20:45

Malaysia	1–0	Myanmar
Nizaruddin 12'	Report

Shah Alam Stadium, Shah Alam
Referee: Yoshida Toshimitsu (Japan)

==== Bronze medal match ====
15 September 2001

Indonesia	0–1	Myanmar
		Yan Paing 44'

MBPJ Stadium, Petaling Jaya
Referee: Rungklay Mongkol (Thailand)

==== Final match ====
15 September 2001
20:45

Malaysia	0–1	Thailand
	Report	Sarawut 75'

Shah Alam Stadium, Shah Alam
Attendance: 70,000
Referee: Lương Thế Tài (Vietnam)

=== Winners ===
2001 SEA Games Men's Tournament
(Thailand)
Thailand
Tenth title

=== Goalscorers ===
5 goals

- (Malaysia) Akmal Rizal
- (Thailand) Manit Noywech

4 goals

- (Indonesia) Bambang Pamungkas
- (Singapore) Indra Sahdan Daud

3 goals

- (Indonesia) Elie Aiboy
- (Myanmar) Aung Tun Naing
- (Thailand) Teeratep Winothai

2 goals

- (Indonesia) Budi Sudarsono
- (Indonesia) Maman
- (Laos) Phengta Phounsamay
- (Malaysia) Nizaruddin Yusof
- (Myanmar) Yan Paing
- (Singapore) Fadzuhasny Juraimi
- (Thailand) Sarawut Treephan
- (Vietnam) Thạch Bảo Khanh

1 goal

- (Brunei) Jasriman Johari
- (Indonesia) Isnan Ali
- (Malaysia) Indra Putra Mahayuddin
- (Malaysia) Irwan Fadzli
- (Malaysia) Nidzam Jamil
- (Myanmar) Nay Thu Hlaing
- (Myanmar) Soe Myat Min
- (Myanmar) Tint Naing Tun Thein
- (Singapore) Mohd Faizal Sazali
- (Singapore) Ratna Suffian
- (Thailand) Anucha Kitpongsri
- (Thailand) Datsakorn Thonglao
- (Thailand) Jukkpant Punpee
- (Thailand) Narongchai Vachiraban
- (Thailand) Sakda Joemdee
- (Thailand) Rungpoj Tawanchri
- (Vietnam) Nguyễn Minh Nghĩa
- (Vietnam) Nguyễn Quốc Trung
- (Vietnam) Tô Đức Cường

=== Final ranking ===
Pos	Team	Pld	W	D	L	GF	GA	GD	Pts	Final result
1	Thailand	6	6	0	0	15	2	+13	18	Gold Medal
2	Malaysia (H)	5	4	0	1	10	2	+8	12	Silver Medal
3	Myanmar	6	3	1	2	8	5	+3	10	Bronze Medal
4	Indonesia	5	2	0	3	12	5	+7	6	Fourth place
5	Singapore	4	2	0	2	10	3	+7	6	Eliminated in group stage
6	Vietnam	3	1	0	2	5	4	+1	3	Eliminated in group stage
7	Laos	4	1	0	3	2	9	−7	3	Eliminated in group stage
8	Cambodia	4	0	1	3	0	14	−14	1	Eliminated in group stage
9	Brunei	3	0	0	3	1	19	−18	0	Eliminated in group stage

(H) Hosts

== Women's tournament ==
2001 SEA Games Women's Football
Tournament details
- Host country: Malaysia
- Dates: 4–14 September
- Teams: 7

Final positions
- Champions: Vietnam (1st title)
- Runners-up: Thailand
- Third place: Myanmar
- Fourth place: Indonesia

Tournament statistics
- Matches played: 13
- Goals scored: 40 (3.08 per match)
- Top scorer: (Vietnam) Lưu Ngọc Mai (7 goals)

=== Participants ===
- Indonesia
- Malaysia
- Myanmar
- Philippines
- Singapore
- Thailand
- Vietnam

=== Group stage ===
==== Group A ====
Team	Pld	W	D	L	GF	GA	GD	Pts
Thailand	3	2	1	0	7	2	+5	7
Myanmar	3	2	1	0	7	2	+5	7
Malaysia	3	1	0	2	3	7	−4	3
Philippines	3	0	0	3	0	6	−6	0

4 September 2001
17:00

Thailand	4–0	Philippines
Srathongvian 13', 50'; Buathong 33' (pen.); Chaiyawut 71'	Report

Cheras Stadium, Kuala Lumpur
4 September 2001
20:45

Myanmar	5–1	Malaysia
Mar Lin Win 13', 33', 57'; Zin Mar Wun 72'; Nu Nu Khaine Win 86'	Report	Nor Aishah 84'

Cheras Stadium, Kuala Lumpur

6 September 2001
17:00

Thailand	2–1	Malaysia
Chaiyawut 27', 90'	Report	Widiya 86'

Cheras Stadium, Kuala Lumpur
6 September 2001
20:45

Myanmar	1–0	Philippines
Hla Hla Than 54'	Report

Cheras Stadium, Kuala Lumpur

10 September 2001

Malaysia	1–0	Philippines
Rozana 30'

Cheras Stadium, Kuala Lumpur
10 September 2001
17:00

Thailand	1–1	Myanmar
Promphuy 30'		Aye Nandar Hlaing 76'

Cheras Stadium, Kuala Lumpur

==== Group B ====
Team	Pld	W	D	L	GF	GA	GD	Pts
Vietnam	2	2	0	0	11	0	+11	6
Indonesia	2	1	0	1	1	6	−5	3
Singapore	2	0	0	2	0	6	−6	0

5 September 2001
20:45

Vietnam	6–0	Indonesia
Đoàn Thị Kim Chi 2'; Nguyễn Thị Mai Lan 20'; Lưu Ngọc Mai 40', 75', 83'; Bùi Thị Hiền Lương 72'	Report

Cheras Stadium, Kuala Lumpur

7 September 2001
17:00

Vietnam	5–0	Singapore
Nguyễn Thị Mai Lan 9'; Gan Hwee Fern 12' (o.g.); Lưu Ngọc Mai 41', 77'; Nguyễn Thị Hà 89'	Report

Cheras Stadium, Kuala Lumpur

9 September 2001
20:45

Indonesia	1–0	Singapore
Swabra 16'	Report

Cheras Stadium, Kuala Lumpur
Referee: Yayoi (Japan)

=== Knockout stage ===
Semi-finals
12 September
Thailand	2
Indonesia	0
12 September
Vietnam (p)	1 (6)
Myanmar	1 (5)

Final
14 September
Vietnam	4
Thailand	0
Third place
14 September
Myanmar	3
Indonesia	0

==== Semi-finals ====
12 September 2001
17:00

Thailand	2–0	Indonesia
Paturat 84'; Saipin 89'

Cheras Stadium, Kuala Lumpur
12 September 2001
20:45

Vietnam	1–1 (a.e.t.)	Myanmar
Lưu Ngọc Mai 35'	Report	Moe Moe War 90'
Penalties
Lưu Ngọc Mai (penalty scored) ? (penalty scored) ? (penalty scored); Nguyễn Thị Kim Hồng (penalty scored) ? (penalty scored) ? (penalty scored); Trần Thị Bích Hạnh (penalty scored)	7–6	(penalty scored) ? (penalty scored) ? (penalty scored) ? (penalty scored) ? (penalty scored) ? (penalty scored) ? (penalty missed) Yin Moe Aye

Cheras Stadium, Kuala Lumpur

==== Bronze medal match ====
14 September 2001

Myanmar	3–0	Indonesia
My Nilar Htwe 15'; Hla Hla Than 29'; Mar Lar Win 65'

Cheras Stadium, Kuala Lumpur

==== Gold medal match ====
14 September 2001
20:45

Vietnam	4–0	Thailand
Bùi Thị Hiền Lương 9', 83'; Nguyễn Thị Thuý Nga 30' (pen.); Lưu Ngọc Mai 49' (pen.)	Report

Cheras Stadium, Kuala Lumpur
Referee: Zuo Xidi (China)

=== Winners ===
2001 SEA Games Women's Tournament

Vietnam
First title

=== Goalscorers ===
7 goals

- (Vietnam) Lưu Ngọc Mai

3 goals

- (Myanmar) Mar Lin Win
- (Thailand) Ngamsom Chaiyawut
- (Vietnam) Bùi Thị Hiền Lương

2 goals

- (Myanmar) Hla Hla Than
- (Thailand) Nuengrutai Srathongvian
- (Vietnam) Nguyễn Thị Mai Lan

1 goal

- (Indonesia) Yakomina Swabra
- (Malaysia) Nor Aishah
- (Malaysia) Rozana Roslan
- (Malaysia) Widiya Habibah
- (Myanmar) Aye Nandar Hlaing
- (Myanmar) Moe Moe War
- (Myanmar) Mar Lar Win
- (Myanmar) My Nilar Htwe
- (Myanmar) Nu Nu Khaine Win
- (Myanmar) Zin Mar Win
- (Thailand) Penrapai Promphuy
- (Thailand) Pranee Saipin
- (Thailand) Prapa Buathong
- (Thailand) Sirinard Paturat
- (Vietnam) Đoàn Thị Kim Chi
- (Vietnam) Nguyễn Thị Hà
- (Vietnam) Nguyễn Thị Thuý Nga

Own goal

- (Singapore) Gan Hwee Fern (For Vietnam)

=== Final ranking ===
Pos	Team	Pld	W	D	L	GF	GA	GD	Pts	Final result
1	Vietnam	4	3	1	0	16	1	+15	10	Gold Medal
2	Thailand	5	3	1	1	9	6	+3	10	Silver Medal
3	Myanmar	5	3	2	0	11	3	+8	11	Bronze Medal
4	Indonesia	4	1	0	3	1	11	−10	3	Fourth place
5	Malaysia (H)	3	1	0	2	3	7	−4	3	Eliminated in group stage
6	Philippines	3	0	0	3	0	6	−6	0	Eliminated in group stage
7	Singapore	2	0	0	2	0	6	−6	0	Eliminated in group stage

(H) Hosts

== Notes ==
Preceded by 1999	Football at the SEA Games; 2001 SEA Games	Succeeded by 2003
