= 2006 FIFA World Cup qualification – AFC second round =

International football competition

The AFC second round of 2006 FIFA World Cup qualification began on 18 February 2004 and finished on 17 November 2004.

The highest-ranked country in each group at the end of the stage progressed to the third round, where the eight remaining teams were divided into two groups of four.

== Format ==
The 32 teams (25 teams given a bye directly to the second round and 7 winners from the preliminaries) were split into eight groups of four teams each – with all teams playing home and away against each of the other three teams in the group.

The highest-ranked team in each group qualified for the third round.

== Seeding ==
Pot A	Pot B	Pot C	Pot D
South Korea; Japan; China; Saudi Arabia; Iran; United Arab Emirates; Bahrain; Uzbekistan	Qatar; Iraq; Oman; Thailand; Syria; Lebanon; Kuwait; Indonesia	Turkmenistan; Yemen; India; Vietnam; Jordan; Palestine; Malaysia; Kyrgyzstan	Hong Kong; Maldives; Sri Lanka; Laos; Tajikistan; Singapore; Chinese Taipei; North Korea

== Schedule ==
Matchday	Date	Fixtures
Matchday 1	18 February 2004	1 v 2, 3 v 4
Matchday 2	31 March 2004	4 v 1, 3 v 2
Matchday 3	9–10 June 2004	1 v 3, 2 v 4
Matchday 4	8 September 2004	3 v 1, 4 v 2
Matchday 5	9–14 October 2004	2 v 1, 4 v 3
Matchday 6	16–17 November 2004	1 v 4, 2 v 3

== Group 1 ==
Pos	Team	Pld	W	D	L	GF	GA	GD	Pts	Qualification	Iran national football team	Jordan national football team	Qatar national football team	Laos national football team
1	Iran	6	5	0	1	22	4	+18	15	Third round	—	0–1	3–1	7–0
2	Jordan	6	4	0	2	10	6	+4	12		0–2	—	1–0	5–0
3	Qatar	6	3	0	3	16	8	+8	9		2–3	2–0	—	5–0
4	Laos	6	0	0	6	3	33	−30	0		0–7	2–3	1–6	—

Rules for classification: Tiebreakers
18 February 2004
16:00

Jordan	5–0	Laos
Aqel 40'; Shelbaieh 45'; Al-Shagran 63'; Ragheb 90'; Shehdeh 90+2'	Report

Amman International Stadium, Amman
Attendance: 5,000
Referee: Sultan Al Mozahmi (Oman)
18 February 2004
19:00

Iran	3–1	Qatar
Vahedi 8'; Mahdavikia 44'; Daei 62' (pen.)	Report	Hamzah 70'

Azadi Stadium, Tehran
Attendance: 0 (as punishment for violence in an Asian Cup qualifier against North Korea in 12 November 2003)
Referee: Khader Haj Khader (Syria)

31 March 2004
17:00

Laos	0–7	Iran
	Report	Daei 9', 17' (pen.); Enayati 32', 36'; Khouphachansy 54' (o.g.); Taghipour 68', 83'

Laos National Stadium, Vientiane
Attendance: 7,000
Referee: Yang Mu Sheng (Chinese Taipei)
31 March 2004
18:30

Jordan	1–0	Qatar
Salim 70'	Report

Amman International Stadium, Amman
Attendance: 15,000
Referee: Qasem Shaban (Kuwait)

9 June 2004
18:30

Iran	0–1	Jordan
	Report	Al-Shboul 83'

Azadi Stadium, Tehran
Attendance: 35,000
Referee: Toru Kamikawa (Japan)
9 June 2004
19:30

Qatar	5–0	Laos
Mustafa 17', 37'; Jassem 69', 86'; Bechir 89'	Report

Al-Gharafa Stadium, Doha
Attendance: 500
Referee: Naji Abu Armana (Palestine)

8 September 2004
17:00

Laos	1–6	Qatar
Chanthalome 88'	Report	Rizik 36'; Kamil 42'; Bechir 50'; Hamzah 70'; Abdullah 86'; Al-Shammari 89'

Laos National Stadium, Vientiane
Attendance: 2,900
Referee: Jimmy Napitupulu (Indonesia)
8 September 2004
20:00

Jordan	0–2	Iran
	Report	Vahedi 80'; Daei 91'

Amman International Stadium, Amman
Attendance: 20,000
Referee: Lu Jun (China PR)

13 October 2004
17:00

Laos	2–3	Jordan
Phaphouvanin 13'; Thongphachan 53'	Report	Al-Maharmeh 28'; Al-Shagran 73', 76'

Laos National Stadium, Vientiane
Attendance: 3,000
Referee: Ram Gosh (Bangladesh)
13 October 2004
19:30

Qatar	2–3	Iran
Mohammed 18'; Golmohammadi 75' (o.g.)	Report	Hashemian 9', 89'; Borhani 78'

Al-Gharafa Stadium, Doha
Attendance: 8,000
Referee: Kwon Jong-chul (Korea Republic)

17 November 2004
19:00

Qatar	2–0	Jordan
Al-Mal 60'; Al Khater 75'	Report

Al-Gharafa Stadium, Doha
Attendance: 800
Referee: Toshimitsu Yoshida (Japan)
17 November 2004
19:30

Iran	7–0	Laos
Daei 8', 20', 28', 58'; Nekounam 63', 72'; Borhani 69'	Report

Azadi Stadium, Tehran
Attendance: 30,000
Referee: Mamed Mamedov (Turkmenistan)

== Group 2 ==
Pos	Team	Pld	W	D	L	GF	GA	GD	Pts	Qualification	Uzbekistan national football team	Iraq national football team	Palestine national football team	Chinese Taipei national football team
1	Uzbekistan	6	5	1	0	16	3	+13	16	Third round	—	1–1	3–0	6–1
2	Iraq	6	3	2	1	17	7	+10	11		1–2	—	4–1	6–1
3	Palestine	6	2	1	3	11	11	0	7		0–3	1–1	—	8–0
4	Chinese Taipei	6	0	0	6	3	26	−23	0		0–1	1–4	0–1	—

Rules for classification: Tiebreakers
18 February 2004
17:00

Uzbekistan	1–1	Iraq
Soliev 78'	Report	Salah 57'

Pakhtakor Markaziy Stadium, Tashkent
Attendance: 24,000
Referee: Suresh Srinivasan (India)
18 February 2004
18:30

Palestine	8–0	Chinese Taipei
Al-Kord 10'; Habaib 20', 32'; Atura 43'; Kettlun 52', 86'; Amer 76'; Keshkesh 82'	Report

Al-Wakrah Stadium, Al Wakrah, Qatar
Attendance: 1,000
Referee: Mukhtar Al Yarimi (Yemen)

31 March 2004
15:00

Chinese Taipei	0–1	Uzbekistan
	Report	Koshelev 59'

Chungshan Soccer Stadium, Taipei
Attendance: 2,500
Referee: Setiyono Midi Nitrorejo (Indonesia)
31 March 2004
17:05

Palestine	1–1	Iraq
Kettlun 72'	Report	Farhan 20'

Al-Wakrah Stadium, Al Wakrah, Qatar
Attendance: 500
Referee: Hassan Al Shoufi (Syria)

9 June 2004
18:00

Iraq	6–1	Chinese Taipei
Farhan 2', 14'; Fawzi 18'; Mnajed 50', 85'; Swadi 68'	Report	Huang 57'

Amman International Stadium, Amman, Jordan
Attendance: 2,000
Referee: Jassim Al Hail (Qatar)
9 June 2004
19:00

Uzbekistan	3–0	Palestine
Ashurmatov 6'; Shishelov 42'; Djeparov 89'	Report

Pakhtakor Markaziy Stadium, Tashkent
Attendance: 35,000
Referee: Masoud Moradi (Iran)

8 September 2004
15:00

Chinese Taipei	1–4	Iraq
Huang 82'	Report	Sadir 4', 43'; Attiya 75'; Mahmoud 86'

Chungshan Soccer Stadium, Taipei
Attendance: 5,000
Referee: Purushothaman Baskar (India)
8 September 2004
18:30

Palestine	0–3	Uzbekistan
	Report	Qosimov 9'; Djeparov 32'; Bikmoev 78'

Umm-Affai Stadium, Ar Rayyan, Qatar
Attendance: 400
Referee: Shamsul Maidin (Singapore)

13 October 2004
18:00

Iraq	1–2	Uzbekistan
Munir 29'	Report	Shatskikh 10'; Geynrikh 22'

Amman International Stadium, Amman, Jordan
Attendance: 10,000
Referee: Shamsul Maidin (Singapore)
14 October 2004
16:00

Chinese Taipei	0–1	Palestine
	Report	Amer 90+4'

Chungshan Soccer Stadium, Taipei
Attendance: 500
Referee: Riyaz Rasheed (Maldives)

16 November 2004
19:30

Iraq	4–1	Palestine
Munir 54', 58'; Mohammed 65'; Akram 70'	Report	Zatara 71'

Al-Gharafa Stadium, Doha, Qatar
Attendance: 500
Referee: Ali Al Mutlaq (Saudi Arabia)
17 November 2004
16:00

Uzbekistan	6–1	Chinese Taipei
Geynrikh 5'; Qosimov 12', 45', 85'; Shatskikh 18'; Koshelev 34'	Report	Huang 64'

Pakhtakor Markaziy Stadium, Tashkent
Attendance: 20,000
Referee: Muhsen Basma (Syria)

== Group 3 ==
Pos	Team	Pld	W	D	L	GF	GA	GD	Pts	Qualification	Japan national football team	Oman national football team	India national football team	Singapore national football team
1	Japan	6	6	0	0	16	1	+15	18	Third round	—	1–0	7–0	1–0
2	Oman	6	3	1	2	14	3	+11	10		0–1	—	0–0	7–0
3	India	6	1	1	4	2	18	−16	4		0–4	1–5	—	1–0
4	Singapore	6	1	0	5	3	13	−10	3		1–2	0–2	2–0	—

Rules for classification: Tiebreakers
18 February 2004
16:00

India	1–0	Singapore
Renedy 50'	Report

Fatorda Stadium, Margao
Attendance: 28,000
Referee: Farajollah Yasrebi (Iran)
18 February 2004
19:20

Japan	1–0	Oman
Kubo 90+2'	Report

Saitama Stadium, Saitama
Attendance: 60,270
Referee: Halim Abdul Hamid (Malaysia)

31 March 2004
17:45

India	1–5	Oman
Renedy 18'	Report	Amad Ali 12'; Ahmed Mubarak 26', 49'; Al-Hinai 60', 88'

Jawaharlal Nehru Stadium, Kochi
Attendance: 48,000
Referee: Danny Kim Heng (Malaysia)
31 March 2004
20:00

Singapore	1–2	Japan
Sahdan 62'	Report	Takahara 33'; Fujita 81'

Jalan Besar Stadium, Singapore
Attendance: 6,000
Referee: Bae Jae-yong (Korea Republic)

9 June 2004
19:20

Japan	7–0	India
Kubo 12'; Fukunishi 25'; Nakamura 29'; Suzuki 54'; Nakazawa 65', 76'; Ogasawara 68'	Report

Saitama Stadium, Saitama
Attendance: 63,000
Referee: Huang Junjie (China PR)
9 June 2004
19:45

Oman	7–0	Singapore
Al-Maimani 9', 44', 64', 86'; Ayil 25', 53'; Al-Mukhaini 39'	Report

Sultan Qaboos Sports Complex, Muscat
Attendance: 2,000
Referee: Abdulhameed Ebrahim (Bahrain)

8 September 2004
17:30

India	0–4	Japan
	Report	Suzuki 45'; Ono 60'; Fukunishi 71'; Miyamoto 87'

Yuva Bharati Krirangan, Bidhannagar
Attendance: 90,000
Referee: Basel Hajjar (Syria)
8 September 2004
19:30

Singapore	0–2	Oman
	Report	Shaaban 3'; Ali 82'

Jalan Besar Stadium, Singapore
Attendance: 4,000
Referee: Deshapryia Arambekade (Sri Lanka)

13 October 2004
18:30

Oman	0–1	Japan
	Report	Suzuki 52'

Sultan Qaboos Sports Complex, Muscat
Attendance: 35,000
Referee: Lu Jun (China PR)
13 October 2004
19:30

Singapore	2–0	India
Sahdan 73'; Amri 76'	Report

Jalan Besar Stadium, Singapore
Attendance: 3,609
Referee: Yousuf Husain (Bahrain)

17 November 2004
18:00

Oman	0–0	India
	Report

Sultan Qaboos Sports Complex, Muscat
Attendance: 2,000
Referee: Mahmoud Nurilddin (Iraq)
17 November 2004
19:20

Japan	1–0	Singapore
Tamada 13'	Report

Saitama Stadium, Saitama
Attendance: 58,881
Referee: Mohsen Torky (Iran)

== Group 4 ==
Pos	Team	Pld	W	D	L	GF	GA	GD	Pts	Qualification	Kuwait national football team	China national football team	Hong Kong national football team	Malaysia national football team
1	Kuwait	6	5	0	1	15	2	+13	15	Third round	—	1–0	4–0	6–1
2	China	6	5	0	1	14	1	+13	15		1–0	—	7–0	4–0
3	Hong Kong	6	2	0	4	5	15	−10	6		0–2	0–1	—	2–0
4	Malaysia	6	0	0	6	2	18	−16	0		0–2	0–1	1–3	—

Rules for classification: Tiebreakers
18 February 2004
19:30

China	1–0	Kuwait
Hao Haidong 75'	Report

Tianhe Stadium, Guangzhou
Attendance: 50,000
Referee: Dmitriy Roman (Uzbekistan)
18 February 2004
20:45

Malaysia	1–3	Hong Kong
Talib 39' (pen.)	Report	Ng Wai Chiu 17'; Chu Siu Kei 84'; Kwok Yue Hung 90+3'

Darulmakmur Stadium, Kuantan
Attendance: 12,000
Referee: Santhan Nagalingam (Singapore)

31 March 2004
20:00

Hong Kong	0–1	China
	Report	Hao Haidong 71'

Siu Sai Wan Sports Ground, Hong Kong
Attendance: 9,000
Referee: Mongkol Rungklay (Thailand)
31 March 2004
20:45

Malaysia	0–2	Kuwait
	Report	Al-Mutawa 75'; Al Harbi 87'

Darulmakmur Stadium, Kuantan
Attendance: 9,327
Referee: Kazuhiko Matsumura (Japan)

9 June 2004
19:30

China	4–0	Malaysia
Hao Haidong 43'; Sun Jihai 62'; Li Xiaopeng 66', 76'	Report

TEDA Football Stadium, Tianjin
Attendance: 35,000
Referee: Park Sang-gu (Korea Republic)
9 June 2004
20:30

Kuwait	4–0	Hong Kong
Seraj 12'; Al-Mutawa 38'; Neda 45'; Al-Salamah 75'	Report

Kazma SC Stadium, Kuwait City
Attendance: 9,000
Referee: Tallat Najm (Lebanon)

8 September 2004
20:00

Hong Kong	0–2	Kuwait
	Report	Neda 38'; Humaidan 70'

Siu Sai Wan Sports Ground, Hong Kong
Attendance: 1,500
Referee: Emil Busurmankulov (Kyrgyzstan)
8 September 2004
20:45

Malaysia	0–1	China
	Report	Li Jinyu 67'

City Stadium, Penang
Attendance: 14,000
Referee: Jasim Abdul Karim (Bahrain)

13 October 2004
19:00

Kuwait	1–0	China
Ali 47'	Report

Kazma SC Stadium, Kuwait City
Attendance: 10,000
Referee: Chaiwat Kunsuta (Thailand)
13 October 2004
20:00

Hong Kong	2–0	Malaysia
Chu Siu Kei 5'; Wong Chun Yue 51'	Report

Mong Kok Stadium, Hong Kong
Attendance: 2,425
Referee: Radwan Ghandour (Lebanon)

17 November 2004
16:00

Kuwait	6–1	Malaysia
Al-Mutawa 17'; Abdullah 60', 70'; Laheeb 75', 85'; Al Hamad 82'	Report	Yahyah 19'

Kazma SC Stadium, Kuwait City
Attendance: 15,000
Referee: Nail Lutfullin (Uzbekistan)
17 November 2004
21:00

China	7–0	Hong Kong
Li Jinyu 8', 47'; Shao Jiayi 42', 44'; Xu Yunlong 49'; Yu Genwei 88'; Li Weifeng 90+2'	Report

Tianhe Stadium, Guangzhou
Attendance: 20,300
Referee: Lee Jong-kuk (Korea Republic)

== Group 5 ==
Pos	Team	Pld	W	D	L	GF	GA	GD	Pts	Qualification	North Korea national football team	United Arab Emirates national football team	Thailand national football team	Yemen national football team
1	North Korea	6	3	2	1	11	5	+6	11	Third round	—	0–0	4–1	2–1
2	United Arab Emirates	6	3	1	2	6	6	0	10		1–0	—	1–0	3–0
3	Thailand	6	2	1	3	9	10	−1	7		1–4	3–0	—	1–1
4	Yemen	6	1	2	3	6	11	−5	5		1–1	3–1	0–3	—

Rules for classification: Tiebreakers
18 February 2004
16:00

Yemen	1–1	North Korea
Al Selwi 73'	Report	Hong Yong-jo 85'

Althawra Sports City Stadium, Sana'a
Attendance: 15,000
Referee: Yousuf Husain (Bahrain)
18 February 2004
19:15

United Arab Emirates	1–0	Thailand
Rashid 22'	Report

Sheikh Khalifa International Stadium, Al Ain
Attendance: 4,000
Referee: Sun Baojie (China PR)

31 March 2004
16:00

Yemen	0–3	Thailand
	Report	Chaikamdee 69'; Surasiang 71'; Senamuang 88'

Althawra Sports City Stadium, Sana'a
Attendance: 25,000
Referee: Mohammad Mansour (Lebanon)
31 March 2004
16:00

North Korea	0–0	United Arab Emirates
	Report

Kim Il-sung Stadium, Pyongyang
Attendance: 20,000
Referee: Zhou Weixin (China PR)

9 June 2004
19:00

Thailand	1–4	North Korea
Senamuang 51'	Report	Kim Yong-su 42', 71'; Sin Yong-nam 52'; Hong Yong-jo 67'

Rajamangala Stadium, Bangkok
Attendance: 30,000
Referee: Vladislav Tseytlin (Uzbekistan)
9 June 2004
20:00

United Arab Emirates	3–0	Yemen
Abdulrahman 24'; Omer 28', 73'	Report

Sheikh Khalifa International Stadium, Al Ain
Attendance: 5,000
Referee: Allabergen Sapaev (Turkmenistan)

8 September 2004
16:00

Yemen	3–1	United Arab Emirates
Al Nono 22', 77'; Abduljabar 49'	Report	Omer 26'

Althawra Sports City Stadium, Sana'a
Attendance: 17,000
Referee: Khalil Al Ghamdi (Saudi Arabia)
8 September 2004
16:00

North Korea	4–1	Thailand
An Yong-hak 49', 73'; Hong Yong-jo 55'; Ri Hyok-chol 60'	Report	Suksomkit 72'

Yanggakdo Stadium, Pyongyang
Attendance: 20,000
Referee: Masoud Moradi (Iran)

13 October 2004
15:30

North Korea	2–1	Yemen
Ri Han-jae 1'; Hong Yong-jo 64'	Report	Jaber 76'

Yanggakdo Stadium, Pyongyang
Attendance: 15,000
Referee: Võ Minh Trí (Vietnam)
13 October 2004
19:00

Thailand	3–0	United Arab Emirates
Jakapong 10'; Nanok 30'; Chaiman 67'	Report

Rajamangala Stadium, Bangkok
Attendance: 15,000
Referee: Yuichi Nishimura (Japan)

17 November 2004
18:30

United Arab Emirates	1–0	North Korea
Obaid 58'	Report

Al-Rashid Stadium, Dubai
Attendance: 2,000
Referee: Halim Abdul Hamid (Malaysia)
17 November 2004
19:00

Thailand	1–1	Yemen
Siriwong 90+5'	Report	Al-Shehri 69'

Rajamangala Stadium, Bangkok
Attendance: 15,000
Referee: Purushothaman Baskar (India)

== Group 6 ==
Pos	Team	Pld	W	D	L	GF	GA	GD	Pts	Qualification	Bahrain national football team	Syria national football team	Tajikistan national football team	Kyrgyzstan national football team
1	Bahrain	6	4	2	0	15	4	+11	14	Third round	—	2–1	4–0	5–0
2	Syria	6	2	2	2	7	7	0	8		2–2	—	2–1	0–1
3	Tajikistan	6	2	1	3	5	9	−4	7		0–0	0–1	—	2–1
4	Kyrgyzstan	6	1	1	4	5	12	−7	4		1–2	1–1	1–2	—

Rules for classification: Tiebreakers
18 February 2004
15:00

Kyrgyzstan	1–2	Tajikistan
Berezovsky 12'	Report	Burkhanov 31', 53'

Spartak Stadium, Bishkek
Attendance: 14,000
Referee: Nail Lutfullin (Uzbekistan)
18 February 2004
18:30

Bahrain	2–1	Syria
A. Hubail 64', 73'	Report	Sheikh Al-Eshreh 80'

Al Muharraq Stadium, Arad
Attendance: 5,000
Referee: Adunyachart Khanthama (Thailand)

31 March 2004
16:00

Kyrgyzstan	1–1	Syria
Ishenbaev 55'	Report	Kailouni 86'

Spartak Stadium, Bishkek
Attendance: 17,000
Referee: Praveer Bose (India)
31 March 2004
16:00

Tajikistan	0–0	Bahrain
	Report

Pamir Stadium, Dushanbe
Attendance: 17,000
Referee: Shamsul Maidin (Singapore)

9 June 2004
19:15

Bahrain	5–0	Kyrgyzstan
A. Hubail 12', 45', 60'; Ali 66'; Abdulla 82'	Report

Al Muharraq Stadium, Arad
Attendance: 2,800
Referee: Mohamed Al Saeedi (United Arab Emirates)
10 June 2004
17:15

Syria	2–1	Tajikistan
Al Rashed 76'; Rafe 80'	Report	Kholmatov 35'

Khaled bin Walid Stadium, Homs
Attendance: 18,000
Referee: Saad Kamil Al-Fadhli (Kuwait)

8 September 2004
16:00

Tajikistan	0–1	Syria
	Report	Rafe 35'

Pamir Stadium, Dushanbe
Attendance: 18,000
Referee: Subkhiddin Mohd Salleh (Malaysia)
8 September 2004
17:00

Kyrgyzstan	1–2	Bahrain
Kenjisariev 86'	Report	Ali 23'; M. Hubail 58'

Spartak Stadium, Bishkek
Attendance: 10,000
Referee: Mongkol Rungklay (Thailand)

13 October 2004
15:00

Tajikistan	2–1	Kyrgyzstan
Rabiev 19'; Hakimov 37'	Report	Chikishev 84'

Pamir Stadium, Dushanbe
Attendance: 11,000
Referee: Naser Al Enezi (Kuwait)
13 October 2004
18:00

Syria	2–2	Bahrain
Sheikh Al-Eshreh 12'; Al Hussain 18'	Report	Mahfoodh 27'; Yousef 90+2'

Abbasiyyin Stadium, Damascus
Attendance: 35,000
Referee: Masoud Moradi (Iran)

17 November 2004
17:00

Syria	0–1	Kyrgyzstan
	Report	Amin 47'

Abbasiyyin Stadium, Damascus
Attendance: 1,000
Referee: Satop Tongkhan (Thailand)
17 November 2004
18:00

Bahrain	4–0	Tajikistan
Yousef 9'; Husain 41'; M. Hubail 42', 77'	Report

Bahrain National Stadium, Riffa
Attendance: 15,000
Referee: Sun Baojie (China PR)

== Group 7 ==
Pos	Team	Pld	W	D	L	GF	GA	GD	Pts	Qualification	South Korea national football team	Lebanon national football team	Vietnam national football team	Maldives national football team
1	South Korea	6	4	2	0	9	2	+7	14	Third round	—	2–0	2–0	2–0
2	Lebanon	6	3	2	1	11	5	+6	11		1–1	—	0–0	3–0
3	Vietnam	6	1	1	4	5	9	−4	4		1–2	0–2	—	4–0
4	Maldives	6	1	1	4	5	14	−9	4		0–0	2–5	3–0	—

Rules for classification: Tiebreakers
18 February 2004
17:00

Vietnam	4–0	Maldives
Phan Văn Tài Em 9', 60'; Nguyễn Minh Hải 13'; Phạm Văn Quyến 80' (pen.)	Report

Mỹ Đình National Stadium, Hanoi
Attendance: 25,000
Referee: Fong Yau Fat Jame (Hong Kong)
18 February 2004
19:00

South Korea	2–0	Lebanon
Cha Du-ri 32'; Cho Byung-kuk 51'	Report

Suwon World Cup Stadium, Suwon
Attendance: 22,000
Referee: Maugeb Al Dosari (Saudi Arabia)

31 March 2004
16:00

Maldives	0–0	South Korea
	Report

Rasmee Dhandu Stadium, Malé
Attendance: 12,000
Referee: Anura de Silva Vidanagamage (Sri Lanka)
31 March 2004
17:00

Vietnam	0–2	Lebanon
	Report	R. Antar 83'; Hamieh 88'

Chùa Cuõi Stadium, Nam Định
Attendance: 25,000
Referee: Ravshan Irmatov (Uzbekistan)

9 June 2004
19:00

South Korea	2–0	Vietnam
Ahn Jung-hwan 29'; Kim Do-heon 61'	Report

Daejeon World Cup Stadium, Daejeon
Attendance: 40,019
Referee: Omer Al Mehannah (Saudi Arabia)
9 June 2004
20:30

Lebanon	3–0	Maldives
Zein 21'; R. Antar 87'; Nasseredine 93'	Report

Beirut Municipal Stadium, Beirut
Attendance: 18,000
Referee: Mahmoud Nurilddin (Iraq)

8 September 2004
16:00

Maldives	2–5	Lebanon
Fazeel 79'; Umar 88'	Report	Nasseredine 4', 58'; F. Antar 44'; Chahoud 63'; R. Antar 75'

Rasmee Dhandu Stadium, Malé
Attendance: 12,000
Referee: Hassan Al Ajmi (Oman)
8 September 2004
17:00

Vietnam	1–2	South Korea
Phan Văn Tài Em 49'	Report	Lee Dong-gook 63'; Lee Chun-soo 76'

Thống Nhất Stadium, Ho Chi Minh City
Attendance: 25,000
Referee: Toshimitsu Yoshida (Japan)

13 October 2004
15:45

Maldives	3–0	Vietnam
Thariq 29'; Ashfaq 68', 85'	Report

Rasmee Dhandu Stadium, Malé
Attendance: 10,000
Referee: Rizwan Haq (India)
13 October 2004
18:00

Lebanon	1–1	South Korea
Nasseredine 28'	Report	Choi Jin-cheul 8'

Beirut Municipal Stadium, Beirut
Attendance: 21,000
Referee: Ravshan Irmatov (Uzbekistan)

17 November 2004
18:00

Lebanon	0–0	Vietnam
	Report

Beirut Municipal Stadium, Beirut
Attendance: 1,000
Referee: Abdulhameed Ebrahim (Bahrain)
17 November 2004
20:00

South Korea	2–0	Maldives
Kim Do-heon 66'; Lee Dong-gook 80'	Report

Seoul World Cup Stadium, Seoul
Attendance: 64,000
Referee: Subash Lazar (Singapore)

== Group 8 ==
Pos	Team	Pld	W	D	L	GF	GA	GD	Pts	Qualification	Saudi Arabia national football team	Turkmenistan national football team	Indonesia national football team	Sri Lanka national football team
1	Saudi Arabia	6	6	0	0	14	1	+13	18	Third round	—	3–0	3–0	3–0
2	Turkmenistan	6	2	1	3	8	10	−2	7		0–1	—	3–1	2–0
3	Indonesia	6	2	1	3	8	12	−4	7		1–3	3–1	—	1–0
4	Sri Lanka	6	0	2	4	4	11	−7	2		0–1	2–2	2–2	—

Rules for classification: Tiebreakers
18 February 2004
20:15

Saudi Arabia	3–0	Indonesia
Sowed 4', 39'; Al-Qahtani 45'	Report

King Fahd International Stadium, Riyadh
Attendance: 1,000
Referee: Naser Al Ghafary (Jordan)
18 February 2004
19:00

Turkmenistan	2–0	Sri Lanka
Öwekow 40'; N. Baýramow 56'	Report

Köpetdag Stadium, Ashgabat
Attendance: 11,000
Referee: Abdulla Al Banai (United Arab Emirates)

31 March 2004
19:00

Turkmenistan	3–1	Indonesia
W. Baýramow 10', 74'; Kulyýew 35'	Report	Budi Sudarsono 30'

Olympic Stadium, Ashgabat
Attendance: 5,000
Referee: Muhammad Sahib (Iraq)
31 March 2004
18:30

Sri Lanka	0–1	Saudi Arabia
	Report	Sowed 51'

Sugathadasa Stadium, Colombo
Attendance: 6,000
Referee: Kadyrbek Chynybekov (Kyrgyzstan)

9 June 2004
21:00

Saudi Arabia	3–0	Turkmenistan
Al-Meshal 27', 45'; Noor 32'	Report

King Fahd International Stadium, Riyadh
Attendance: 1,000
Referee: Adunyachart Khanthama (Thailand)
9 June 2004
19:00

Indonesia	1–0	Sri Lanka
Aiboy 30'	Report

Gelora Bung Karno Stadium, Jakarta
Attendance: 30,000
Referee: Ibrahim Nesar (Bangladesh)

8 September 2004
18:30

Sri Lanka	2–2	Indonesia
Steinwall 81'; Karunaratne 82'	Report	Ilham 8'; Sofyan 51'

Sugathadasa Stadium, Colombo
Attendance: 4,000
Referee: Marshoud Hassan (Jordan)
8 September 2004
19:00

Turkmenistan	0–1	Saudi Arabia
	Report	Al-Qahtani 47'

Olympic Stadium, Ashgabat
Attendance: 5,000
Referee: Kwon Jong-chul (Korea Republic)

9 October 2004
19:00

Sri Lanka	2–2	Turkmenistan
Perera 47'; Mudyanselage 57'	Report	D. Baýramow 20'; Nazarow 70'

Sugathadasa Stadium, Colombo
Attendance: 4,000
Referee: Al Bannai Abdulla (United Arab Emirates)
12 October 2004
19:30

Indonesia	1–3	Saudi Arabia
Ilham 50'	Report	Al-Meshal 9'; Abdulghani 13'; Al-Qahtani 80'

Gelora Bung Karno Stadium, Jakarta
Attendance: 30,000
Referee: Subkhiddin Mohd Salleh (Malaysia)

17 November 2004
19:30

Indonesia	3–1	Turkmenistan
Ilham 20', 47', 59'	Report	Durdyýew 25'

Gelora Bung Karno Stadium, Jakarta
Attendance: 15,000
Referee: Shaban Qasem (Kuwait)
17 November 2004
20:00

Saudi Arabia	3–0	Sri Lanka
Al-Harthi 6'; Al-Shalhoub 45' (pen.); Fallata 65'	Report

Prince Mohamed bin Fahd Stadium, Dammam
Attendance: 2,000
Referee: Muflah Mohamed (Oman)

== Goalscorers ==
There were 297 goals scored in 96 matches, for an average of 3.09 goals per match.

8 goals

- (Iran national football team) Ali Daei

5 goals

- (Bahrain national football team) A'ala Hubail
- (Indonesia national football team) Ilham Jaya Kesuma

4 goals

- (Lebanon national football team) Ali Nasseredine
- (North Korea national football team) Hong Yong-jo
- (Oman national football team) Badar Al-Maimani
- (Uzbekistan national football team) Mirjalol Qosimov

3 goals

- (Bahrain national football team) Mohamed Hubail
- (China national football team) Hao Haidong
- (China national football team) Li Jinyu
- (Chinese Taipei national football team) Huang Wei-yi
- (Iraq national football team) Razzaq Farhan
- (Iraq national football team) Qusay Munir
- (Japan national football team) Takayuki Suzuki
- (Jordan national football team) Badran Al-Shagran
- (Kuwait national football team) Bader Al-Mutawa
- (Lebanon national football team) Roda Antar
- (Palestine national football team) Roberto Kettlun
- (Saudi Arabia national football team) Talal Al-Meshal
- (Saudi Arabia national football team) Yasser Al-Qahtani
- (Saudi Arabia national football team) Ibrahim Sowed
- (United Arab Emirates national football team) Mohamed Omer
- (Vietnam national football team) Phan Văn Tài Em

2 goals

- (Bahrain national football team) Husain Ali
- (Bahrain national football team) Talal Yousef
- (China national football team) Li Xiaopeng
- (China national football team) Shao Jiayi
- (Hong Kong national football team) Chu Siu Kei
- (India national football team) Renedy Singh
- (Iran national football team) Arash Borhani
- (Iran national football team) Reza Enayati
- (Iran national football team) Vahid Hashemian
- (Iran national football team) Javad Nekounam
- (Iran national football team) Ebrahim Taghipour
- (Iran national football team) Alireza Vahedi Nikbakht
- (Iraq national football team) Ahmad Mnajed
- (Iraq national football team) Salih Sadir
- (Japan national football team) Takashi Fukunishi
- (Japan national football team) Tatsuhiko Kubo
- (Japan national football team) Yuji Nakazawa
- (Kuwait national football team) Bashar Abdullah
- (Kuwait national football team) Faraj Laheeb
- (Kuwait national football team) Musaed Neda
- (Maldives national football team) Ali Ashfaq
- (North Korea national football team) An Yong-hak
- (North Korea national football team) Kim Yong-su
- (Oman national football team) Mohammed Al-Hinai
- (Oman national football team) Amad Ali
- (Oman national football team) Khalifa Ayil
- (Oman national football team) Ahmed Mubarak
- (Palestine national football team) Taysir Amer
- (Palestine national football team) Safwan Habaib
- (Qatar national football team) Sayed Ali Bechir
- (Qatar national football team) Waleed Hamzah
- (Qatar national football team) Waleed Jassem
- (Qatar national football team) Mubarak Mustafa
- (Singapore national football team) Indra Sahdan Daud
- (South Korea national football team) Kim Do-heon
- (South Korea national football team) Lee Dong-gook
- (Syria national football team) Yousef Sheikh Al-Eshreh
- (Syria national football team) Raja Rafe
- (Tajikistan national football team) Pirmurod Burkhanov
- (Thailand national football team) Kiatisuk Senamuang
- (Turkmenistan national football team) Wladimir Baýramow
- (Uzbekistan national football team) Server Djeparov
- (Uzbekistan national football team) Alexander Geynrikh
- (Uzbekistan national football team) Leonid Koshelev
- (Uzbekistan national football team) Maksim Shatskikh
- (Yemen national football team) Ali Al Nono

1 goal

- (Bahrain national football team) Mohamed Husain
- (Bahrain national football team) Sayed Mahfoodh
- (Bahrain national football team) Duaij Naser Abdulla
- (China national football team) Li Weifeng
- (China national football team) Sun Jihai
- (China national football team) Xu Yunlong
- (China national football team) Yu Genwei
- (Hong Kong national football team) Wong Chun Yue
- (Hong Kong national football team) Ng Wai Chiu
- (Hong Kong national football team) Kwok Yue Hung
- (Indonesia national football team) Elie Aiboy
- (Indonesia national football team) Ismed Sofyan
- (Indonesia national football team) Budi Sudarsono
- (Iran national football team) Mehdi Mahdavikia
- (Iraq national football team) Nashat Akram
- (Iraq national football team) Saad Attiya
- (Iraq national football team) Hussam Fawzi
- (Iraq national football team) Younis Mahmoud
- (Iraq national football team) Emad Mohammed
- (Iraq national football team) Ahmad Salah Alwan
- (Iraq national football team) Jassim Swadi
- (Japan national football team) Toshiya Fujita
- (Japan national football team) Tsuneyasu Miyamoto
- (Japan national football team) Shunsuke Nakamura
- (Japan national football team) Mitsuo Ogasawara
- (Japan national football team) Shinji Ono
- (Japan national football team) Naohiro Takahara
- (Japan national football team) Keiji Tamada
- (Jordan national football team) Abdel-Hadi Al-Maharmeh
- (Jordan national football team) Haitham Al-Shboul
- (Jordan national football team) Hatem Aqel
- (Jordan national football team) Awad Ragheb
- (Jordan national football team) Mo'ayyad Salim
- (Jordan national football team) Mustafa Shehdeh
- (Jordan national football team) Mahmoud Shelbaieh
- (Kuwait national football team) Fahad Al Hamad
- (Kuwait national football team) Hamad Al Harbi
- (Kuwait national football team) Khalaf Al-Salamah
- (Kuwait national football team) Waleed Ali
- (Kuwait national football team) Nawaf Humaidan
- (Kuwait national football team) Hussain Seraj
- (Kyrgyzstan national football team) Vyacheslav Amin
- (Kyrgyzstan national football team) Valeri Berezovsky
- (Kyrgyzstan national football team) Sergey Chikishev
- (Kyrgyzstan national football team) Azamat Ishenbaev
- (Kyrgyzstan national football team) Emil Kenjisariev
- (Laos national football team) Phutthadavong Chanthalome
- (Laos national football team) Visay Phaphouvanin
- (Laos national football team) Sengphet Thongphachan
- (Lebanon national football team) Faisal Antar
- (Lebanon national football team) Mahmoud Chahoud
- (Lebanon national football team) Khaled Hamieh
- (Lebanon national football team) Haitham Zein
- (Malaysia national football team) Mohd Amri Yahyah
- (Malaysia national football team) Rosdi Talib
- (Maldives national football team) Ibrahim Fazeel
- (Maldives national football team) Ahmed Thoriq
- (Maldives national football team) Ali Umar
- (North Korea national football team) Ri Han-jae
- (North Korea national football team) Ri Hyok-chol
- (North Korea national football team) Sin Yong-nam
- (Oman national football team) Ahmed Hadid Al-Mukhaini
- (Oman national football team) Yousuf Shaaban
- (Palestine national football team) Ziyad Al-Kord
- (Palestine national football team) Francisco Atura
- (Palestine national football team) Ahmed Keshkesh
- (Palestine national football team) Imad Zatara
- (Qatar national football team) Meshal Abdullah
- (Qatar national football team) Nayef Mubarak Al-Khater
- (Qatar national football team) Saad Al-Shammari
- (Qatar national football team) Nasser Kamil Mubarak
- (Qatar national football team) Bilal Mohammed
- (Qatar national football team) Wesam Rizik
- (Qatar national football team) Mohammed Salem Al-Mal
- (Saudi Arabia national football team) Hussein Abdulghani
- (Saudi Arabia national football team) Saad Al-Harthi
- (Saudi Arabia national football team) Mohammad Al-Shalhoub
- (Saudi Arabia national football team) Fahad Fallata
- (Saudi Arabia national football team) Mohammed Noor
- (Singapore national football team) Khairul Amri
- (South Korea national football team) Ahn Jung-hwan
- (South Korea national football team) Cha Du-ri
- (South Korea national football team) Cho Byung-kuk
- (South Korea national football team) Choi Jin-cheul
- (South Korea national football team) Lee Chun-soo
- (Sri Lanka national football team) Chandradasa Karunaratne
- (Sri Lanka national football team) Rathnayake Mudyanselage
- (Sri Lanka national football team) Isuru Perera
- (Sri Lanka national football team) Dudley Steinwall
- (Syria national football team) Jehad Al Hussain
- (Syria national football team) Mohamad Yehya Al Rashed
- (Syria national football team) Meaataz Kailouni
- (Tajikistan national football team) Mansurdzhon Hakimov
- (Tajikistan national football team) Akmal Kholmatov
- (Tajikistan national football team) Yusuf Rabiev
- (Thailand national football team) Sarayoot Chaikamdee
- (Thailand national football team) Therdsak Chaiman
- (Thailand national football team) Nontapan Jeansatawong
- (Thailand national football team) Anon Nanok
- (Thailand national football team) Niweat Siriwong
- (Thailand national football team) Sutee Suksomkit
- (Thailand national football team) Nirut Surasiang
- (Turkmenistan national football team) Döwlet Baýramow
- (Turkmenistan national football team) Nazar Baýramow
- (Turkmenistan national football team) Gurbangeldi Durdyýew
- (Turkmenistan national football team) Begençmuhammet Kulyýew
- (Turkmenistan national football team) Artýom Nazarow
- (Turkmenistan national football team) Guwançmuhammet Öwekow
- (United Arab Emirates national football team) Rashid Abdulrahman
- (United Arab Emirates national football team) Saleh Obaid
- (United Arab Emirates national football team) Mohamed Rashid
- (Uzbekistan national football team) Bakhtiyor Ashurmatov
- (Uzbekistan national football team) Marat Bikmoev
- (Uzbekistan national football team) Vladimir Shishelov
- (Uzbekistan national football team) Anvarjon Soliev
- (Vietnam national football team) Nguyễn Minh Hải
- (Vietnam national football team) Phạm Văn Quyến
- (Yemen national football team) Radwan Abduljabar
- (Yemen national football team) Akram Al-Selwi
- (Yemen national football team) Saleh Al-Shehri
- (Yemen national football team) Fathi Jaber

1 own goal

- (Iran national football team) Yahya Golmohammadi (against Qatar)
- (Laos national football team) Nitsavong Khoupachansy (against Iran)
