= Hong Kong national football team results (2000–2009) =

- Win Draw Loss

This is a list of the Hong Kong national football team results from 2000 to 2009.

== 2000 ==
10 February International Friendly	Hong Kong	0–0	Singapore	Hong Kong

25 April International Friendly	Hong Kong	0–1	China	Hong Kong

28 May 56th HK–Macau Interport	Macau	0–1	Hong Kong	Macau
			Cheng Siu Chung 86'

8 October International Friendly	Hong Kong	1–0	Singapore	Hong Kong

12 November International Friendly	United Arab Emirates	1–1	Hong Kong	Abu Dhabi, United Arab Emirates

10 December International Friendly	Hong Kong	1–2	Estonia	So Kon Po, Hong Kong
	Chan Ho Man 20'	Report	Zelinski 38', 53'	Stadium: Hong Kong Stadium; Attendance: 1,500; Referee: Kazuhiko Matsumura (Japan)

== 2001 ==
8 October 2001 AIFF Sahara Cup	Hong Kong	0–2	Jordan	Goa, India

4 March 2002 FIFA World Cup; Qualification Group 3	Hong Kong	1–1	Palestine	So Kon Po, Hong Kong
15:15 (UTC+8)	Chan Ho Man 72'	Report	El-Kair 64'	Stadium: Hong Kong Stadium; Attendance: 7,000; Referee: Han Byung-Hwa (South Korea)

8 March 2002 FIFA World Cup; Qualification Group 3	Malaysia	2–0	Hong Kong	So Kon Po, Hong Kong
20:15 (UTC+8)	Rakhli 46', 79'	Report		Stadium: Hong Kong Stadium; Attendance: 5,000; Referee: Musallam Al Bloushi (United Arab Emirates)

11 March 2002 FIFA World Cup; Qualification Group 3	Qatar	2–0	Hong Kong	So Kon Po, Hong Kong
15:15 (UTC+8)	Al-Enazi 42'; Feng Ji-zhi 67' (o.g.)	Report		Stadium: Hong Kong Stadium; Attendance: 4,500; Referee: Toru Kamikawa (Japan)

20 March 2002 FIFA World Cup; Qualification Group 3	Palestine	1–0	Hong Kong	Doha, Qatar
15:30 (UTC+3)	Abulatifa 58'	Report		Stadium: Jassim Bin Hamad Stadium; Attendance: 500; Referee: Rahman Al Zaid (Saudi Arabia)

23 March 2002 FIFA World Cup; Qualification Group 3	Hong Kong	2–1	Malaysia	Doha, Qatar
20:15 (UTC+3)	Feng Ji-zhi 12'; Yeung Hei Chi 78'	Report	Omar 86'	Stadium: Jassim Bin Hamad Stadium; Attendance: 100; Referee: Muflah Mohamed (Oman)

25 March 2002 FIFA World Cup; Qualification Group 3	Hong Kong	0–3	Qatar	Doha, Qatar
18:15 (UTC+3)		Report	Noubi 45'; Mubarak 89'; Al-Tamimi 90'	Stadium: Jassim Bin Hamad Stadium; Attendance: 2,000; Referee: Khader Haj Khader (Syria)

== 2002 ==
No any matches were played in 2002.

== 2003 ==
22 February 2003 East Asian Championship; Preliminary Competition	Hong Kong	2–0	Chinese Taipei	So Kon Po, Hong Kong
16:00 (UTC+8)	Kwok Yue Hung 77'; Lee Wai Man 79'			Stadium: Hong Kong Stadium; Attendance: 6,055; Referee: Kazuhiko Matsumura (Japan)

24 February 2003 East Asian Championship; Preliminary Competition	Hong Kong	3–0	Macau	So Kon Po, Hong Kong
16:00 (UTC+8)	Lee Kin Wo 46' (pen.); Au Wai Lun 59', 62'			Stadium: Hong Kong Stadium; Attendance: 1,602; Referee: Park Sang-Gu (South Korea)

28 February 2003 East Asian Championship; Preliminary Competition	Hong Kong	10–0	Mongolia	So Kon Po, Hong Kong
16:00 (UTC+8)	Au Wai Lun 6', 53'; Yau Kin Wai 10'; Chan Ho Man 12', 40', 42'; Cheung Sai Ho 13', 26' (pen.), 90'; Kwok Yue Hung 79'			Stadium: Hong Kong Stadium; Attendance: 1,814

2 March 2003 East Asian Championship; Preliminary Competition	Hong Kong	11–0	Guam	So Kon Po, Hong Kong
16:00 (UTC+8)	Lau Chi Keung 7', 35', 56'; Au Wai Lun 8', 61', 86' (pen.); Chan Chi Hong 40'; Poon Yiu Cheuk 42'; Chan Ho Man 46', 58'; Lee Wai Man 90'			Stadium: Hong Kong Stadium; Attendance: 6,862; Referee: Huang Junjie (China)

25 March 2004 AFC Asian Cup; Qualification Preliminary; Group D	Hong Kong	5–1	Laos	Hong Kong
	Chan Chi Hong 17', 35'; Kwok Yue Hung 47'; Au Wai Lun 59' (pen.), 82'	Report	Visay Phaphouvanin 66'

30 March 2004 AFC Asian Cup; Qualification Preliminary; Group D	Hong Kong	2–2	Bangladesh	Hong Kong
	Au Wai Lun 44' (pen.); Szeto Man Chun 45'	Report	Feroj Mahmood Hossain 66'; Md. Monwar Hossen 77'

4 August International Friendly	Singapore	4–1	Hong Kong	Singapore
			Au Wai Lun	Attendance: 2,364

6 November 2004 AFC Asian Cup; Qualification Group A	Uzbekistan	4–1	Hong Kong	Tashkent, Uzbekistan
18:00 (UTC+5)	Akopyants 1'; Shishelov 17', 67'; Soliev 28'		Law Chun Bong 45'	Stadium: Pakhtakor Stadium; Referee: Suresh Srinivasan (India)

8 November 2004 AFC Asian Cup; Qualification Group A	Hong Kong	0–0	Tajikistan	Tashkent, Uzbekistan

10 November 2004 AFC Asian Cup; Qualification Group A	Hong Kong	2–1	Thailand	Tashkent, Uzbekistan
	Cheung Sai Ho 28'; Wong Chun Yue 69'		Datsakorn Thonglao 64'

17 November 2004 AFC Asian Cup; Qualification Group A	Thailand	4–0	Hong Kong	Bangkok, Thailand
	Manit Noywech 24'; Datsakorn Thonglao 35'; Sarayoot Chaikamdee 79', 88' (pen.)

19 November 2004 AFC Asian Cup; Qualification Group A	Hong Kong	0–1	Uzbekistan	Bangkok, Thailand
20:00 (UTC+7)			Nikolay Shirshov 32'	Stadium: Rajamangala Stadium

21 November 2004 AFC Asian Cup; Qualification Group A	Hong Kong	0–1	Tajikistan	Bangkok, Thailand
			Dzhomikhon Muhidinov 68'

4 December 2003 East Asian Championship; Final Tournament	Hong Kong	1–3	South Korea	Tokyo, Japan
16:30 (UTC+9)	Lawrence 34' (yellow card) 34'	Report	Kim Do-heon 23'; Kim Do-hoon 50'; Ahn Jung-hwan 57'	Stadium: National Stadium; Attendance: 14,895; Referee: Jimmy M. R. Napitupulu (Indonesia)

7 December 2003 East Asian Championship; Final Tournament	Japan	1–0	Hong Kong	Saitama, Japan
19:16 (UTC+9)	Alex 37' (pen.); Kubo (yellow card) 58'	Report	Fan Chun Yip (yellow card) 36'; Man Pei Tak (yellow card) 58'; Szeto Man Chun (yellow card) 63'	Stadium: Saitama Stadium 2002; Attendance: 45,145; Referee: Chalach Piromya (Thailand)

10 December 2003 East Asian Championship; Final Tournament	China	3–1	Hong Kong	Kanagawa, Japan
16:28 (UTC+9)	Zhao Xuri 20'; Liu Jindong 21'; Yang Chen 44'; Zhou Haibin (yellow card) 87'	Report	Lo Chi Kwan 75'	Stadium: International Stadium Yokohama; Attendance: 17,400; Referee: Chalach Piromya (Thailand)

== 2004 ==
18 February 2006 FIFA World Cup; Qualification 2nd Round; Group 4	Malaysia	1–3	Hong Kong	Kuantan, Malaysia
19:20 UTC+8	Talib 39'	Report	Ng Wai Chiu 17'; Chu Siu Kei 84'; Kwok Yue Hung 93'	Stadium: Darulmakmur Stadium; Attendance: 12,000; Referee: Santhan Nagalingam (Singapore)

31 March 2006 FIFA World Cup; Qualification 2nd Round; Group 4	Hong Kong	0–1	China	Siu Sai Wan, Hong Kong
20:00 UTC+8		Report	Hao Haidong 71'	Stadium: Siu Sai Wan Sports Ground; Attendance: 9,291; Referee: Santhan Nagalingam (Singapore)

9 June 2006 FIFA World Cup; Qualification 2nd Round; Group 4	Kuwait	4–0	Hong Kong	Kuwait City, Kuwait
20:30 UTC+3	Seraj 12'; Al-Mutawa 38'; Al Enezi 45'; Al Dawood 75'	Report		Stadium: Kazma SC Stadium; Attendance: 9,000; Referee: Tallat Najm (Lebanon)

8 September 2006 FIFA World Cup; Qualification 2nd Round; Group 4	Hong Kong	0–2	Kuwait	Siu Sai Wan, Hong Kong
20:00 UTC+8		Report	Al Enezi 38'; Humaidan 70'	Stadium: Siu Sai Wan Sports Ground; Attendance: 1,500; Referee: Emil Busurmankulov (Kyrgyzstan)

13 October 2006 FIFA World Cup; Qualification 2nd Round; Group 4	Hong Kong	2–0	Malaysia	Mong Kok, Hong Kong
20:00 UTC+8	Chu Siu Kei 5'; Wong Chun Yue 51'	Report		Stadium: Mong Kok Stadium; Attendance: 2,425; Referee: Radwan Ghandour (Lebanon)

17 November 2006 FIFA World Cup; Qualification 2nd Round; Group 4	China	7–0	Hong Kong	Guangzhou, China
21:00 UTC+8	Li Jinyu 8', 47'; Shao Jiayi 42', 44'; Xu Yunlong 49'; Yu Genwei 88'; Li Weifeng 90+2'	Report		Stadium: Tianhe Stadium; Attendance: 20,300; Referee: Lee Jong Kuk (Korea Republic)

30 November International Friendly	Singapore	0–0 (5–6 p)	Hong Kong	Singapore

2 December International Friendly	Hong Kong	2–2	Myanmar	Singapore

== 2005 ==
9 February 2005 Carlsberg Cup	Hong Kong	1–7	Brazil	So Kon Po, Hong Kong
17:00 UTC+8	Lee Sze Ming 86'	Report	Lúcio 21'; Carlos 30'; Oliveira 45', 58'; Ronaldinho 50'; Robinho 78'; Alex 79' (pen.)	Stadium: Hong Kong Stadium; Attendance: 23,425; Referee: Zhou Weixin (China)

5 March 2005 East Asian Championship; Preliminary Competition	Hong Kong	6–0	Mongolia	Taipei, Taiwan
16:30 UTC+8	Chu Siu Kei 30'; Law Chun Bong 48'; Wong Chun Yue 50'; Lam Ka Wai 73'; Chan Yiu Lun 92', 93'	Report		Stadium: Zhongshan Soccer Stadium

7 March 2005 East Asian Championship; Preliminary Competition	Guam	0–15	Hong Kong	Taipei, Taiwan
14:00 UTC+8		Report	Chan Wai Ho 1'; Chan Siu Ki 8', 18', 28', 30', 36', 42', 87'; Chan Yiu Lun 16', 31'; Wong Chun Yue 24', 43', 45'; Chu Siu Kei 67'; Poon Man Tik 89'	Stadium: Zhongshan Soccer Stadium

11 March 2005 East Asian Championship; Preliminary Competition	Chinese Taipei	0–5	Hong Kong	Taipei, Taiwan
14:00 UTC+8		Report	Chan Yiu Lun 7', 45'; Lam Ka Wai 19'; Poon Yiu Cheuk 59'; Cheung Sai Ho 61'	Stadium: Zhongshan Soccer Stadium

13 March 2005 East Asian Championship; Preliminary Competition	Hong Kong	0–2	North Korea	Taipei, Taiwan
14:00 UTC+8		Report	Kang Jin Hyok 43'; Ri Myong Sam 64'	Stadium: Zhongshan Soccer Stadium

== 2006 ==
29 January 2006 Carlsberg Cup	Hong Kong	0–3	Denmark	So Kon Po, Hong Kong
17:15 UTC+8		Report	Berg 19'; Augustinussen 39'; Due 51'	Stadium: Hong Kong Stadium; Attendance: 16,481

1 February 2006 Carlsberg Cup	Hong Kong	0–4	Croatia	So Kon Po, Hong Kong
20:15 UTC+8		Report	Knezevic 15'; Leko 28'; Eduardo 64'; Bonsjak 71'	Stadium: Hong Kong Stadium; Attendance: 13,971

15 February International Friendly	Hong Kong	1–1	Singapore	So Kon Po, Hong Kong
19:30 UTC+8	Gerard 65'	Report	Noh Alam Shah 66' (pen.)	Stadium: Hong Kong Stadium; Attendance: 610

18 February International Friendly	Hong Kong	2–2	India	So Kon Po, Hong Kong
15:00 UTC+8	Gerard 3'; Law Chun Bong 17'	Report	Rahim 61'; Bhutia 68' (pen.)	Stadium: Hong Kong Stadium; Attendance: 861

22 February 2007 AFC Asian Cup; Qualification Group F	Hong Kong	0–3	Qatar	So Kon Po, Hong Kong
15:00 UTC+8		Report	Yaser 11'; Bechir 44'; Mohd Hassan 90'	Stadium: Hong Kong Stadium; Attendance: 1,806; Referee: Yuichi Nishimura (Japan)

1 March 2007 AFC Asian Cup; Qualification Group F	Bangladesh	0–1	Hong Kong	Dhaka, Bangladesh
16:00 UTC+6		Report	Chan Siu Ki 82'	Stadium: Bangabandhu National Stadium; Attendance: 1,000; Referee: Subrata Sarkar (India)

3 June 62nd HK–Macau Interport	Macau	0–0	Hong Kong	Taipa, Macau
16:00 UTC+8		Report		Stadium: Macau University of Science and Technology Sports Field

12 August International Friendly	Hong Kong	1–2	Singapore	So Kon Po, Hong Kong
18:00 UTC+8	Lee Sze Ming 68'	Report	Noh Alam Shah 19'; Itimi Dickson Edherefe 76'	Stadium: Hong Kong Stadium

16 August 2007 AFC Asian Cup; Qualification Group F	Uzbekistan	2–2	Hong Kong	Tashkent, Uzbekistan
19:00 UTC+5	Soliev 18'; Shatskikh 35'	Report	Sham Kwok Keung 66', 87'	Stadium: Pakhtakor Markaziy Stadium; Attendance: 15,000; Referee: Qasem Shaban (Kuwait)

6 September 2007 AFC Asian Cup; Qualification Group F	Hong Kong	0–0	Uzbekistan	So Kon Po, Hong Kong
20:00 UTC+8		Report		Stadium: Hong Kong Stadium; Attendance: 7,608; Referee: Lee Gi-Young (South Korea)

11 October 2007 AFC Asian Cup; Qualification Group F	Qatar	2–0	Hong Kong	Doha, Qatar
21:00 UTC+3	Bilal Mohammed 43'; Yasser 53'	Report		Stadium: Al Gharrafa Stadium; Attendance: 1,000; Referee: Mohammed Kousa (Syria)

15 November 2007 AFC Asian Cup; Qualification Group F	Hong Kong	2–0	Bangladesh	Mong Kok, Hong Kong
20:00 UTC+8	Gerard 44', 79' (pen.)	Report		Stadium: Mong Kok Stadium; Attendance: 1,273; Referee: Kim Dong-Jin (South Korea)

== 2007 ==
1 June International Friendly	Indonesia	3–0	Hong Kong	Jakarta, Indonesia
19:00 UTC+7		Report

10 June 63rd HK–Macau Interport	Hong Kong	2–1	Macau	So Kon Po, Hong Kong
15:00 UTC+8	Chu Siu Kei 23'; Chan Siu Ki 66'	Report	Chan Kin Sing 39'	Stadium: So Kon Po Recreation Ground

19 June 2008 East Asian Championship; Preliminary Stage 2 Group B	Hong Kong	1–1	Chinese Taipei	Taipa, Macau
15:00 UTC+8	Lo Chi Kwan 56'	Report	Huang Wei Yi 61'	Stadium: Macau Stadium; Attendance: 200; Referee: Kim Eui Soo (Korea Republic)

21 June 2008 East Asian Championship; Preliminary Stage 2 Group B	Hong Kong	15–1	Guam	Taipa, Macau
15:00 UTC+8	Chan Siu Ki 4', 20', 36', 40', 50'; Lo Kwan Yee 8', 40'; Poon Yiu Cheuk 21'; Cheng Siu Wai 31'; Lo Chi Kwan 38'; Cordeiro 56'; Dominic Gadia 67' (o.g.); Law Chun Bong 73'; Gerard 76'; Luk Koon Pong 86'	Report	Chris Mendiola 33'	Stadium: Macau Stadium; Attendance: 300; Referee: Hajime Matsuo (Japan)

24 June 2008 East Asian Championship; Preliminary Stage 2 Final	North Korea	1–0	Hong Kong	Taipa, Macau
18:00 UTC+8	Mun In-guk 82'	Report		Stadium: Macau Stadium; Attendance: 300; Referee: Kenji Ogiya (Japan)

21 October 2010 FIFA World Cup; Qualification 1st Round; 1st Leg	Timor-Leste	2–3	Hong Kong	Gianyar, Indonesia (Note: Timor-Leste elected to play their home leg in Indonesia.)
15:30 UTC+8	Da Silva 41', 69'	Report	Cheng Siu Wai 25', 50'; Esteves 35' (o.g.)	Stadium: Gianyar Stadium; Attendance: 1,500; Referee: Rosdi Shaharul (Malaysia)

28 October 2010 FIFA World Cup; Qualification 1st Round; 2nd Leg	Hong Kong	8–1 (11–3 agg.)	Timor-Leste	So Kon Po, Hong Kong
15:30 UTC+8	Lo Kwan Yee 2'; Chan Siu Ki 5', 78', 85'; Cheung Sai Ho 49'; Cheng Siu Wai 67', 70'; Lam Ka Wai 83'	Report	Da Silva 53'	Stadium: Hong Kong Stadium; Attendance: 1,542; Referee: Mohsen Torky (Iran)

10 November 2010 FIFA World Cup; Qualification 2nd Round; 1st Leg	Hong Kong	0–0	Turkmenistan	So Kon Po, Hong Kong
14:00 UTC+8		Report		Stadium: Hong Kong Stadium; Attendance: 2,823; Referee: Salem Mujghef (Jordan)

18 November 2010 FIFA World Cup; Qualification 2nd Round; 2nd Leg	Turkmenistan	3–0 (3–0 agg.)	Hong Kong	Ashgabat, Turkmenistan
18:00 UTC+5	Nasyrov 42'; Bayramov 53'; Mirzoyev 80'	Report		Stadium: Olympic Stadium (Saparmurat); Attendance: 30,000; Referee: Abdullah Al Hilali (Oman)

== 2008 ==
19 November International Friendly	Macau	1–9	Hong Kong	Macau
19:00 UTC+9		Report

== 2009 ==
14 January International Friendly	Hong Kong	2–1	India	So Kon Po, Hong Kong
20:00 UTC+9	Au Yeung Yiu Chung 70'; Chan Siu Ki (yellow card) 83'; Ng Wai Chiu 90' (yellow card) 90'	Report	Bhutia 80'	Stadium: Hong Kong Stadium; Attendance: 1,200

21 January 2011 AFC Asian Cup; Qualification Group A	Hong Kong	1–3	Bahrain	So Kon Po, Hong Kong
19:30 UTC+8	Cheng Siu Wai 90'	Report	Abdullatif 10'; Fatadi 37'; Salman Isa 87'	Stadium: Hong Kong Stadium; Attendance: 6,013; Referee: Vo Minh Tri (Vietnam)

28 January 2011 AFC Asian Cup; Qualification Group A	Yemen	1–0	Hong Kong	Sana'a, Yemen
16:15 UTC+3	Al Selwi 52'	Report		Stadium: Ali Muhesen Stadium; Attendance: 10,000; Referee: Abdullah Al Hilali (Oman)

23 August 2010 East Asian Championship; Preliminary Round 2	Chinese Taipei	0–4	Hong Kong	Kaohsiung, Taiwan
19:00 UTC+8		Report	Lee Wai Lim 38'; Chan Wai Ho 45+1'; Chan Siu Ki 60' (yellow card) 87'; Gerard 63'	Stadium: World Games Stadium; Attendance: 12,000; Referee: Minoru Tojo (Japan)

25 August 2010 East Asian Championship; Preliminary Round 2	Hong Kong	0–0	North Korea	Kaohsiung, Taiwan
16:30 UTC+8	Gerard (yellow card) 82'	Report		Stadium: World Games Stadium; Attendance: 100; Referee: Kim Jong-Hyeok (Korea Republic)

27 August 2010 East Asian Championship; Preliminary Round 2	Hong Kong	12–0	Guam	Kaohsiung, Taiwan
16:30 UTC+8	Man Pei Tak 5' (yellow card) 53'; Wong Chin Hung 15'; Chan Siu Ki 18', 35', 75', 77'; Chao Pengfei 37', 71', 90+2'; Leung Chun Pong 41'; Poon Yiu Cheuk 89'; Chan Wai Ho 90'	Report	Borja (yellow card) 53' (yellow-red card) 66'	Stadium: World Games Stadium; Attendance: 1,500; Referee: Minoru Tojo (Japan)

8 October 2011 AFC Asian Cup; Qualification Group A	Japan	6–0	Hong Kong	Shizuoka, Japan
19:20 UTC+9	Okazaki 17', 74', 76'; Nagatomo 28'; Nakazawa 50'; Túlio 67'	Report		Stadium: Outsourcing Stadium; Attendance: 16,028; Referee: Mohsen Torky (Iran)

18 November 2011 AFC Asian Cup; Qualification Group A	Hong Kong	0–4	Japan	So Kon Po, Hong Kong
18:30 UTC+8		Report	Hasebe 32'; Satō 74'; S. Nakamura 84'; Okazaki 90+1' (pen.)	Stadium: Hong Kong Stadium; Attendance: 13,254; Referee: Peter Green (Australia)
