= Lebanon national football team results (2000–2009) =

This is a list of the Lebanon national football team results from 2000 to 2009.

In 2000, Lebanon hosted the AFC Asian Cup: it came in last place in its group after two draws and one loss. The national team also failed to qualify for the 2002 and 2006 World Cups, as well as the 2004 Asian Cup.

== Results ==
=== 2000 ===
16 February 2000 Friendly	Lebanon	1–0	North Korea	Beirut, Lebanon

23 February 2000 Friendly	Lebanon	1–1	Jordan	Tripoli, Lebanon

8 March 2000 Friendly	Jordan	1–1	Lebanon	Amman, Jordan

13 May 2000 Friendly	Jordan	1–1	Lebanon	Limassol, Cyprus

21 May 2000 Friendly	Lebanon	0–0	Saudi Arabia	Bekaa, Lebanon

23 May 2000 2000 WAFF Championship	Iraq	2–1	Lebanon	Amman, Jordan

25 May 2000 2000 WAFF Championship	Lebanon	2–0	Kyrgyzstan	Amman, Jordan

27 May 2000 2000 WAFF Championship	Jordan	0–0	Lebanon	Amman, Jordan

25 June 2000 Friendly	Lebanon	3–1	Kuwait	Tripoli, Lebanon

5 August 2000 Friendly	Lebanon	3–1	Oman	Bekaa, Lebanon

8 August 2000 Friendly	Lebanon	1–2	Oman	Bekaa, Lebanon

7 September 2000 Friendly	Lebanon	0–1	United Arab Emirates	Beirut, Lebanon

10 September 2000 Friendly	Lebanon	2–2	United Arab Emirates	Beirut, Lebanon

12 October 2000 2000 Asian Cup GS	Lebanon	0–4	Iran	Beirut, Lebanon

15 October 2000 2000 Asian Cup GS	Lebanon	2–2	Iraq	Beirut, Lebanon

18 October 2000 2000 Asian Cup GS	Lebanon	1–1	Thailand	Beirut, Lebanon

=== 2001 ===
31 January 2001 Friendly	Lebanon	0–0	Iraq	Beirut, Lebanon

7 March 2001 Friendly	Lebanon	2–2	Syria	Tripoli, Lebanon

4 April 2001 Friendly	Lebanon	1–1	Bahrain	Beirut, Lebanon

25 April 2001 Friendly	Lebanon	3–0	Philippines	Tripoli, Lebanon

13 May 2001 2002 World Cup qualification	Lebanon	6–0	Pakistan	Beirut, Lebanon

15 May 2001 2002 World Cup qualification	Lebanon	4–0	Sri Lanka	Beirut, Lebanon

17 May 2001 2002 World Cup qualification	Lebanon	1–2	Thailand	Beirut, Lebanon

26 May 2001 2002 World Cup qualification	Lebanon	8–1	Pakistan	Bangkok, Thailand

28 May 2001 2002 World Cup qualification	Lebanon	5–0	Sri Lanka	Bangkok, Thailand

30 May 2001 2002 World Cup qualification	Thailand	2–2	Lebanon	Bangkok, Thailand

=== 2002 ===
1 September 2002 2002 WAFF Championship	Jordan	1–0	Lebanon	Damascus, Syria

3 September 2002 2002 WAFF Championship	Iran	2–0	Lebanon	Damascus, Syria

19 December 2002 2002 Arab Nations Cup	Saudi Arabia	1–0	Lebanon	Kuwait City, Kuwait

21 December 2002 2002 Arab Nations Cup	Syria	4–1	Lebanon	Kuwait City, Kuwait

24 December 2002 2002 Arab Nations Cup	Lebanon	4–2	Yemen	Kuwait City, Kuwait

26 December 2002 2002 Arab Nations Cup	Bahrain	0–0	Lebanon	Kuwait City, Kuwait

=== 2003 ===
22 August 2003 Friendly	Lebanon	1–0	Syria	Beirut, Lebanon

4 September 2003 2004 Asian Cup qualification	North Korea	0–1	Lebanon	Pyongyang, North Korea

19 September 2003 Friendly	Bahrain	4–3	Lebanon	Manama, Bahrain

17 October 2003 2004 Asian Cup qualification	Jordan	1–0	Lebanon	Amman, Jordan

3 November 2003 2004 Asian Cup qualification	Lebanon	1–1	North Korea	Beirut, Lebanon

12 November 2003 2004 Asian Cup qualification	Lebanon	0–2	Jordan	Beirut, Lebanon

19 November 2003 2004 Asian Cup qualification	Lebanon	0–3	Iran	Beirut, Lebanon

28 November 2003 2004 Asian Cup qualification	Iran	1–0	Lebanon	Tehran, Iran

16 December 2003 Friendly	Kuwait	2–0	Lebanon	Larnaca, Cyprus

18 December 2003 Friendly	Kuwait	0–0	Lebanon	Larnaca, Cyprus

=== 2004 ===
8 February 2004 Friendly	Lebanon	2–1	Bahrain	Beirut, Lebanon

18 February 2004 2006 World Cup qualification	South Korea	2–0	Lebanon	Suwon, South Korea

23 March 2004 Friendly	Lebanon	0–1	Syria	Jounieh, Lebanon

31 March 2004 2006 World Cup qualification	Vietnam	0–2	Lebanon	Nam Định, Vietnam
			R. Antar 83'; Hamieh 88'

26 May 2004 Friendly	Lebanon	2–2	Bahrain	Beirut, Lebanon

9 June 2004 2006 World Cup qualification	Lebanon	3–0	Maldives	Beirut, Lebanon
			Zein 21'; R. Antar 87'; Nasseredine 90+3'

17 June 2004 2004 WAFF Championship	Iran	4–0	Lebanon	Tehran, Iran

19 June 2004 2004 WAFF Championship	Syria	3–1	Lebanon	Tehran, Iran

3 July 2004 Friendly	China	6–0	Lebanon	Chongqing, China

31 August 2004 Friendly	Jordan	2–2	Lebanon	Amman, Jordan

8 September 2004 2006 World Cup qualification	Maldives	2–5	Lebanon	Malé, Maldives
			Nasseredine 4', 58'; F. Antar 43'; Chahoud 63'; R. Antar 75'

3 October 2004 Friendly	Lebanon	1–3	Kuwait	Tripoli, Lebanon

6 October 2004 Friendly	Lebanon	1–1	Kuwait	Beirut, Lebanon

13 October 2004 2006 World Cup qualification	Lebanon	1–1	South Korea	Beirut, Lebanon
			Nasseredine 28'

17 November 2004 2006 World Cup qualification	Lebanon	0–0	Vietnam	Beirut, Lebanon

1 December 2004 Friendly	Qatar	4–1	Lebanon	Doha, Qatar

=== 2005 ===
2 February 2005 Friendly	Bahrain	2–1	Lebanon	Doha, Qatar
				Stadium: Suheim bin Hamad Stadium

=== 2006 ===
27 January 2006 Friendly	Saudi Arabia	1–2	Lebanon	Riyadh, Saudi Arabia
				Stadium: Prince Faisal bin Fahd Stadium

21 December 2006 2009 Arab Nations Cup qualification	Lebanon	0–0	Mauritania	Beirut, Lebanon

24 December 2006 2009 Arab Nations Cup qualification	Lebanon	4–0	Somalia	Beirut, Lebanon

27 December 2006 2009 Arab Nations Cup qualification	Lebanon	0–0	Sudan	Beirut, Lebanon

=== 2007 ===
16 June 2007 2007 WAFF Championship	Syria	1–0	Lebanon	Amman, Jordan

20 June 2007 2007 WAFF Championship	Jordan	3–0	Lebanon	Amman, Jordan

23 September 2007 Friendly	United Arab Emirates	1–1	Lebanon	Dubai, United Arab Emirates
				Stadium: Maktoum bin Rashid Al Maktoum Stadium

8 October 2007 2010 World Cup qualification	Lebanon	4–1	India	Sidon, Lebanon
20:00	R. Antar 33'; M. Ghaddar 62', 76'; M. El Ali 63'		S. Chhetri 30'	Stadium: Saida Municipal Stadium; Attendance: 500

30 October 2007 2010 World Cup qualification	India	2–2	Lebanon	Margao, India
10:30	S. Chhetri 29'; S. Dias 90+2'	Report	M. Ghaddar 76', 88'	Stadium: Jawaharlal Nehru Stadium; Attendance: 10,000

=== 2008 ===
2 January 2008 Friendly	Kuwait	3–2	Lebanon	Kuwait City, Kuwait

20 January 2008 Friendly	China	0–0	Lebanon	Zhongshan, China

28 January 2008 Friendly	Jordan	4–1	Lebanon	Amman, Jordan

6 February 2008 2010 World Cup qualification	Lebanon	0–1	Uzbekistan	Beirut, Lebanon
		Report	Ahmedov 44'	Stadium: Camille Chamoun Sports City Stadium; Attendance: 800; Referee: Abdullah Al Hilali (Oman)

26 March 2008 2010 World Cup qualification	Singapore	2–0	Lebanon	Kallang, Singapore

9 April 2008 2011 Asian Cup qualification	Lebanon	4–0	Maldives	Beirut, Lebanon

23 April 2008 2011 Asian Cup qualification	Maldives	1–2	Lebanon	Malé, Maldives

27 May 2008 Friendly	Qatar	2–1	Lebanon	Doha, Qatar

2 June 2008 2010 World Cup qualification	Saudi Arabia	4–1	Lebanon	Riyadh, Saudi Arabia

7 June 2008 2010 World Cup qualification	Saudi Arabia	2–1	Lebanon	Riyadh, Saudi Arabia

14 June 2008 2010 World Cup qualification	Uzbekistan	3–0	Lebanon	Tashkent, Singapore
	Ahmedov 50', 63'; Djeparov 90+4'	Report		Stadium: MHSK Stadium; Attendance: 7,000; Referee: Matthew Breeze (Australia)

22 June 2008 2010 World Cup qualification	Lebanon	1–2	Singapore	Beirut, Lebanon

=== 2009 ===
14 January 2009 2011 Asian Cup qualification	Vietnam	3–1	Lebanon	Hanoi, Vietnam

21 January 2009 2009 King's Cup	Thailand	2–1	Lebanon	Phuket, Thailand

23 January 2009 2009 King's Cup	Lebanon	1–0	North Korea	Phuket, Thailand

28 January 2009 2011 Asian Cup qualification	Lebanon	0–2	Syria	Sidon, Lebanon

1 April 2009 Friendly	Lebanon	1–1	Namibia	Sidon, Lebanon

19 August 2009 2009 Nehru Cup	India	0–1	Lebanon	New Delhi, India

22 August 2009 2009 Nehru Cup	Sri Lanka	4–3	Lebanon	New Delhi, India

25 August 2009 2009 Nehru Cup	Lebanon	1–1	Kyrgyzstan	New Delhi, India

27 August 2009 2009 Nehru Cup	Syria	1–0	Lebanon	New Delhi, India

14 November 2009 2011 Asian Cup qualification	Lebanon	0–2	China	Beirut, Lebanon

22 November 2009 2011 Asian Cup qualification	China	1–0	Lebanon	Zhejiang, China
