= 2002 Liga Indonesia Premier Division final =

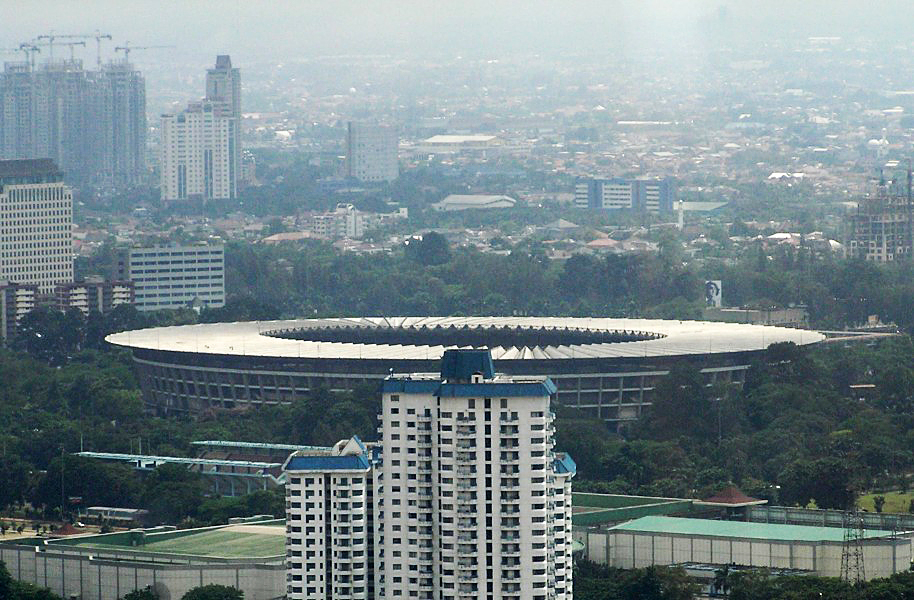
- The final was played at Gelora Bung Karno Stadium.
- Event: 2002 Liga Indonesia Premier Division
Persita Tangerang	Petrokimia Putra
1	2
- After extra time
- Date: 7 July 2002
- Venue: Gelora Bung Karno Stadium, Jakarta
- Referee: Purwanto
- Attendance: 50,000
- Weather: Fine

The 2002 Liga Indonesia Premier Division final was a football match that was played on 7 July 2002 at Gelora Bung Karno Stadium in Jakarta. It was contested by Persita Tangerang and Petrokimia Putra to determine the winner of the 2002 Liga Indonesia Premier Division. Petrokimia Putra won the match 2–1 thanks to a golden goal from Yao Eloii. With the result, Petrokimia Putra claim their first-ever professional title.

== Road to the final ==
Persita Tangerang		Round	Petrokimia Putra	
Main article: 2002 Liga Indonesia Premier Division first stage: West Region: Pos / Team / Pld / W / D / L / GF / GA / GD / Pts; 1 / Semen Padang / 22 / 13 / 2 / 7 / 36 / 21 / +15 / 41; 2 / Arema Malang / 22 / 11 / 5 / 6 / 31 / 25 / +6 / 38; 3 / Persija Jakarta / 22 / 10 / 7 / 5 / 29 / 18 / +11 / 37; 4 / Persita Tangerang / 22 / 10 / 5 / 7 / 44 / 25 / +19 / 35; 5 / PSPS Pekanbaru / 22 / 9 / 7 / 6 / 34 / 16 / +18 / 34; 6 / Persikota Tangerang / 22 / 8 / 10 / 4 / 27 / 18 / +9 / 34; 7 / Pelita Krakatau Steel / 22 / 10 / 3 / 9 / 28 / 24 / +4 / 33; 8 / Persib Bandung / 22 / 9 / 5 / 8 / 26 / 24 / +2 / 32; 9 / PSDS Deli Serdang / 22 / 9 / 2 / 11 / 30 / 38 / −8 / 29; 10 / PSBL Bandar Lampung / 22 / 7 / 5 / 10 / 15 / 26 / −11 / 26; 11 / PSMS Medan / 22 / 7 / 3 / 12 / 21 / 31 / −10 / 24; 12 / Persikab Bandung / 22 / 1 / 2 / 19 / 11 / 66 / −55 / 5; Source: RSSSF		First stage	Main article: 2002 Liga Indonesia Premier Division first stage: East Region: Pos / Team / Pld / W / D / L / GF / GA / GD / Pts; 1 / Petrokimia Putra / 22 / 12 / 7 / 3 / 42 / 22 / +20 / 43; 2 / Barito Putera / 22 / 11 / 6 / 5 / 30 / 25 / +5 / 39; 3 / Persipura Jayapura / 22 / 10 / 4 / 8 / 43 / 25 / +18 / 34; 4 / PSM Makassar / 22 / 10 / 4 / 8 / 31 / 29 / +2 / 34; 5 / Deltras Sidoarjo / 22 / 9 / 5 / 8 / 31 / 32 / −1 / 32; 6 / PKT Bontang / 22 / 8 / 6 / 8 / 34 / 26 / +8 / 30; 7 / PSS Sleman / 22 / 8 / 6 / 8 / 22 / 19 / +3 / 30; 8 / PSIS Semarang / 22 / 8 / 6 / 8 / 20 / 25 / −5 / 30; 9 / Persijatim / 22 / 9 / 2 / 11 / 36 / 38 / −2 / 29; 10 / Persema Malang / 22 / 8 / 5 / 9 / 24 / 27 / −3 / 29; 11 / Persebaya Surabaya / 22 / 6 / 5 / 11 / 24 / 31 / −7 / 23; 12 / Persedikab Kediri / 22 / 2 / 6 / 14 / 22 / 60 / −38 / 12; Source: RSSSF	
Main article: 2002 Liga Indonesia Premier Division second stage: Group A: Pos / Team / Pld / W / D / L / GF / GA / GD / Pts; 1 / Persita Tangerang / 3 / 3 / 0 / 0 / 4 / 1 / +3 / 9; 2 / Petrokimia Putra / 3 / 1 / 0 / 2 / 3 / 2 / +1 / 3; 3 / Persipura Jayapura / 3 / 1 / 0 / 2 / 2 / 3 / −1 / 3; 4 / Arema Malang / 3 / 1 / 0 / 2 / 1 / 4 / −3 / 3; Source: RSSSF		Second stage	Main article: 2002 Liga Indonesia Premier Division second stage: Group A: Pos / Team / Pld / W / D / L / GF / GA / GD / Pts; 1 / Persita Tangerang / 3 / 3 / 0 / 0 / 4 / 1 / +3 / 9; 2 / Petrokimia Putra / 3 / 1 / 0 / 2 / 3 / 2 / +1 / 3; 3 / Persipura Jayapura / 3 / 1 / 0 / 2 / 2 / 3 / −1 / 3; 4 / Arema Malang / 3 / 1 / 0 / 2 / 1 / 4 / −3 / 3; Source: RSSSF	
Opponent	Result	Knockout stage	Opponent	Result
PSM Makassar	2–0	Semifinals	Semen Padang	1–1 (3–2 pen.)

== Match details ==
7 July 2002

Persita Tangerang	1–2 (a.e.t.)	Petrokimia Putra
Ilham 1'	Report	Chelbi 73'; Eloii 93'

Gelora Bung Karno Stadium, Jakarta
Attendance: 50,000
Referee: Purwanto

Persita Tangerang
Petrokimia Putra

Persita Tangerang:
GK	1	(Indonesia) Achmad Kurniawan
CB	5	(Indonesia) Nugroho Adiyanto
CB	22	(Cameroon) Olinga Atangana (c)
CB	6	(Indonesia) Ade Manaf	(yellow card) 38'
RM	16	(Indonesia) Uci Sanusi		(substituted off) 90'
CM	2	(Indonesia) Giman Nurjaman
CM	15	(Indonesia) Firman Utina	(yellow card) 6'
CM	11	(Indonesia) Enjang Rohiman
LM	7	(Brazil) Carlos de Mello		(substituted off) 60'
CF	10	(Indonesia) Ilham Jaya Kesuma
CF	9	(Indonesia) Zaenal Arief	(yellow card) 44'
Substitutes:
DF	17	(Indonesia) M. Soleh		(substituted on) 90'
FW	9	(Liberia) Anthony Ballah		(substituted on) 60'
Head Coach:
(Indonesia) Benny Dollo

Petrokimia Putra:
GK	1	(Indonesia) Mukti Ali Raja
CB	3	(Indonesia) Khusaeri (c)	(yellow card) 50'
CB	18	(Indonesia) Aris Budi Prasetyo
CB	15	(Indonesia) Abdul Rozak
RM	20	(Indonesia) Sonny Kurniawan
CM	4	(Indonesia) Sasi Kirono
CM	16	(Indonesia) Yance Katehokang
CM	99	(Indonesia) Agus Indra Kurniawan		(substituted off) 64'
LM	9	(Indonesia) Gatot Indra		(substituted off) 45'
CF	7	(Indonesia) Widodo Putro		(substituted off) 45'
CF	11	(Indonesia) Jaenal Ichwan
Substitutes:
MF	17	(Indonesia) Heri Purnomo		(substituted on) 45'
MF	19	(Liberia) Samuel Chelbi		(substituted on) 64'
CF	10	(Cameroon) Yao Eloii		(substituted on) 45'
Head Coach:
(Moldova) Serghei Dubrovin
