= Yousuf Shaaban =

Yousuf Shaaban may refer to:

- Yousuf Shaaban (actor) (1931–2021), Egyptian actor
- Yousuf Shaaban (footballer) (born 1982), Omani footballer
