= Mohammed Salem Al-Mal =

Qatari footballer (born 1985)

Mohammed Salem
Personal information
- Full name: Mohammed Salem Al-Mal
- Date of birth: 14 July 1985 (age 41)
- Place of birth: Qatar
- Position: Winger

Senior career*
Years	Team	Apps	(Gls)
2003–2020	Al Arabi		

International career
2004–2006	Qatar	4	(2)
- * Club domestic league appearances and goals

Mohammed Salem Al-Mal (Arabic: محمد سالم المال) (born 14 July 1985) is a Qatari footballer. He currently played former Al Arabi.

== Career statistics ==
=== International ===
Appearances and goals by national team and year
National team	Year	Apps	Goals
Qatar	2004	2	2
Qatar	2005	1	0
Qatar	2006	1	0
Total		4	2

Scores and results list Qatar's goal tally first, score column indicates score after each Al-Mal goal.

List of international goals scored by Mohammed Salem Al-Mal
No.	Date	Venue	Opponent	Score	Result	Competition
1	17 November 2004	Thani bin Jassim Stadium, Al Rayyan, Qatar	Jordan	1–0	2–0	2006 FIFA World Cup qualification
2	1 December 2004	Jassim bin Hamad Stadium, Doha, Qatar	Lebanon	3–0	4–1	Friendly
