= Gurbangeldi Durdyýew =

Turkmenistan footballer and coach

Personal information
- Full name: Gurbangeldi Durdyýew
- Date of birth: 12 January 1973 (age 53)
- Place of birth: Soviet Union (now Turkmenistan)
- Position: Midfielder

Team information
- Current team: Turkmenistan (U23) (head coach)

Senior career*
Years	Team	Apps	(Gls)
1990–1993	Nebitçi	70+	(6+)
1992	→ Arlan Nebitdag (loan)		
1994–1999	Köpetdag Aşgabat		
1999	Zhenis	12	(4)
2000–2005	Nisa Aşgabat		(6+)
2001	→ Shakhter Karagandy (loan)	15	(3)
2002	→ Batys (loan)	0	(0)
2003	→ Metalist Kharkiv (loan)	4	(0)
2004–2005	→ Aboomoslem (loan)	1	(0)
2006–2008	Aşgabat FK		(1+)
Total		102+	(19+)

International career^{‡}
1992–2004	Turkmenistan	40	(3)

Managerial career
- 2019–: Turkmenistan (U23) (head coach)
- * Club domestic league appearances and goals ‡ National team caps and goals as of 25 June 2007

Gurbangeldi Durdyýew, also known as Kurbangeldy Durdyev, (born 12 January 1973) is a Turkmen football manager and former player who played as a midfielder. He is the head coach of the Turkmenistan national under-23 football team.

== Club career ==
Durdyýew began his career in the penultimate season of the Soviet Union football league system, joining Nebitçi in the fourth-tier Soviet Second League B in January 1990. In his first season at the club, he scored twice in 25 matches as the team finished in eighteenth place, and in his second season (1991) he scored four goals in 45 matches and finished in tenth place. He stayed at the club after Turkmenistan declared independence during the dissolution of the Soviet Union in October 1991, spending the inaugural 1992 Ýokary Liga season on loan with Arlan Nebitdag before returning to play for Nebitçi until he left after the 1993 season.

He joined Köpetdag Aşgabat ahead of the 1994 season and he won both the Ýokary Liga and the Turkmenistan Cup in 1994. He won the Ýokary Liga again in 1995 and 1997–98, and he won the Turkmenistan Cup again in 1996–97 and 1999. He joined Kazakhstan Premier League club Zhenis on a one-year deal for the 1999 season and he scored four goals.

He then returned to Turkmenistan to join Nisa Aşgabat in 2000. He returned to Kazakhstan in 2001 to join Shakhter Karagandy on loan, and he debuted for Shakhter Karagandy during the 3–1 loss against Zhenis on 16 August 2001; he scored his first goal for the club on 19 August 2001 during the 2–1 loss against Tobol. He stayed in Kazakhstan in 2002 to join Kazakhstan Second League club Batys on loan for the first half of the season as they eventually failed to gain promotion through the play-offs.

In the second half of 2002, he scored five goals for Nisa Aşgabat, and he won the 2003 Ýokary Liga with the club. He would then spend July and August 2003 on loan with Ukrainian First League club Metalist Kharkiv but he only made five appearances out of a possible six (including one in the Ukrainian Cup against Gelios Kharkiv) as the club finished as runners-up and were promoted back to the Vyshcha Liha; he debuted on 18 August 2003 during the 7–5 loss against Dynamo-2 Kyiv.

He left Turkmenistan again in 2004 and joined Iran Pro League club Aboomoslem and played for the club during the 2004–05 season, making his only appearance during the 2–2 draw against Esteghlal on 29 October 2004 as he played out of position as a centre-back. He returned to Turkmenistan one final time to rejoin Nisa Aşgabat in July 2005 before he left to join Aşgabat FK in January 2006. He scored one goal in 2007, and he won the Ýokary Liga in his final two seasons: 2007 and 2008. He retired in December 2008 at the age of 35.

== International career ==
Durdyýew played for the Turkmenistan national football team from 1992 to 2004, scoring three goals in forty appearances. He made his debut for Turkmenistan on 28 June 1992 during the 2–1 loss against Uzbekistan at the Central Asian Cup, which was the team's first-ever international match. He scored his first goal for Turkmenistan on 14 October 1992 during the 4–0 victory against Kyrgyzstan which was also at the Central Asian Cup.

He would then regularly represent Turkmenistan during FIFA World Cup qualification and AFC Asian Cup qualification, and he played at the 1998 Asian Games. He helped Turkmenistan qualify for the AFC Asian Cup for the first time in 2004 and he played all three matches as Turkmenistan were eliminated in the group stage. He retired from the Turkmenistan national team after scoring during the 2–1 loss against Indonesia on 17 November 2004, which was his final match of the 2006 FIFA World Cup qualification as Turkmenistan failed to progress to the third round.

== Managerial career ==
He became the head coach of Turkmenistan (U23) in 2019.

== Personal life ==
Gurbangeldi Durdyýew's son Didar is also a Turkmenistani footballer, who plays for the national team.

== Career statistics ==
=== International ===
Appearances and goals by national team and year
National team	Year	Apps	Goals
Turkmenistan	1992	3	1
Turkmenistan	1993	4	0
Turkmenistan	1994	0	0
Turkmenistan	1995	—	
Turkmenistan	1996	1	0
Turkmenistan	1997	6	0
Turkmenistan	1998	2	0
Turkmenistan	1999	0	0
Turkmenistan	2000	1	0
Turkmenistan	2001	6	1
Turkmenistan	2002	—	
Turkmenistan	2003	7	0
Turkmenistan	2004	10	1
Total		40	3

Scores and results list Turkmenistan's goal tally first, score column indicates score after each Durdyýew goal.

List of international goals scored by Gurbangeldi Durdyýew
No.	Date	Venue	Cap	Opponent	Score	Result	Competition	Ref.
1.	14 October 1992	Köpetdag stadiony, Ashgabat, Turkmenistan	3	Kyrgyzstan	2–0	4–0	1992 Central Asian Cup	
2.	5 May 2001	Amman International Stadium, Amman, Jordan	21	Jordan	2–1	2–1	2002 FIFA World Cup qualification	
3.	17 November 2004	Gelora Bung Karno Stadium, Jakarta, Indonesia	40	Indonesia	1–1	1–3	2006 FIFA World Cup qualification	

== Honours ==
Nebitçi

- Ýokary Liga: third place 1993

Köpetdag Aşgabat

- Ýokary Liga: 1994, 1995, 1997–98; runner-up 1996, 1998–99
- Turkmenistan Cup: 1994, 1996–97, 1999; runner-up 1995

Nisa Aşgabat

- Ýokary Liga: 2003, runner-up 2002, third place 2000
- Turkmenistan Cup: runner-up 2003

Batys

- Kazakhstan Second League: runner-up 2002

Metalist Kharkiv

- Ukrainian First League: runner-up 2003–04

FK Aşgabat

- Ýokary Liga: 2007, 2008; third place 2006
