= 2009 Arab Cup =

Cancelled Arab Cup

Tournament cancelled

The 2009 Arab Cup was planned to be the ninth staging of the Arab Cup, an association football tournament held between Arab countries by UAFA. The first stage of qualifying began in December 2006, but no further rounds were played and the tournament was cancelled due to lack of sponsorship.

== Qualification ==
The first qualifying stage contained eight teams which had lower FIFA ranking. The eight teams were divided into two groups. Each group contained four teams and the group winners qualified for the second qualifying stage.

The second qualifying stage contained 16 seats; 14 teams which had a higher FIFA ranking get byes from the first qualifying round and were entered into the second qualifying round, and two teams from the first qualifying stage got the last two seats. 16 teams were divided into four groups, four teams in each group and the group winners and runners-up qualified for the Arab Cup.

Top Seeds
(bye to 2nd Qualifying Round)

- Algeria
- Bahrain
- Egypt
- Iraq
- Jordan
- Kuwait
- Libya
- Morocco
- Oman
- Qatar
- Saudi Arabia
- Syria
- Tunisia
- United Arab Emirates

Last 8
(1st Qualifying Round)

- Comoros
- Djibouti
- Lebanon
- Mauritania
- Palestine
- Somalia
- Sudan
- Yemen

The teams sorted by Alphabetical order

=== First qualifying round ===
- The first qualifying stage contained eight teams which had lower FIFA rankings. The eight teams were divided into two groups, each with four teams. The group winners qualified for the second qualifying stage.
- Lebanon qualified as best runners-up due to the withdrawal of Qatar (Qatar would have received a bye to the second qualifying round).
- Palestine withdrew due to traveling problem as Israel did not allow them to travel to Yemen.

==== Group 1 ====
Qualifying tournament of group 1 held in Yemen.

Team	Pld	W	D	L	GF	GA	GD	Pts
Yemen	2	2	0	0	6	1	+5	6
Comoros	2	1	0	1	4	3	+1	3
Djibouti	2	0	0	2	2	8	−6	0
Palestine	0	0	0	0	0	0	0	0

14 December 2006

Yemen	2–0	Comoros
Haggam 73', 90'

Sana'a, Yemen

17 December 2006

Djibouti	1–4	Comoros
Okishi 90+2'		Bi Daoud 5'; Seif 33', 75'; Moni 89'

Sana'a, Yemen

20 December 2006

Yemen	4–1	Djibouti
Al-Sasi 9'; Nasser 48'; Al-Hubaishi 52'; Al-Tahoos 85'		Okishi 7'

Sana'a, Yemen

==== Group 2 ====
Qualifying tournament of group 2 held in Lebanon.

Team	Pld	W	D	L	GF	GA	GD	Pts
Sudan	3	2	1	0	8	1	+7	7
Lebanon	3	1	2	0	4	0	+4	5
Mauritania	3	1	1	1	8	4	+4	4
Somalia	3	0	0	3	3	18	−15	0

21 December 2006

Lebanon	0–0	Mauritania

Camille Chamoun Sports City Stadium
Beirut, Lebanon

21 December 2006

Sudan	6–1	Somalia
Eltahir 8'; Khaider 16', 18'; Mustafa 21' (pen.); Agab 30'; Natali 55'		Ali Abdelaziz 90+3'

Beirut Municipal Stadium
Beirut, Lebanon

24 December 2006

Lebanon	4–0	Somalia
Ghaddar 4', 28'; Nasseredine 72'; Rustom 83'

Camille Chamoun Sports City Stadium
Beirut, Lebanon

24 December 2006

Mauritania	0–2	Sudan
		Agab 3'; Tambal 90'

Beirut Municipal Stadium
Beirut, Lebanon

27 December 2006

Somalia	2–8	Mauritania
Ali Abdelaziz 26' (pen.), 67'		Mohamed 4' (pen.), 24'; Dominique 14', 27' (pen.); Ndiaye 30', 43'; Khuro 75', 88'

Beirut Municipal Stadium
Beirut, Lebanon

27 December 2006

Lebanon	0–0	Sudan

Camille Chamoun Sports City Stadium
Beirut, Lebanon

=== Second qualifying round ===
- The second qualifying stage contained 16 seats, 14 teams with a higher FIFA ranking received byes in the first qualifying round and were entered into the second qualifying round, plus two teams from the first qualifying stage to complete the last two seats. 16 teams were divided into four groups, with four teams in each group. The group winners and runners-up qualified for the Arab Cup.
- Qatar withdrew and Lebanon qualified as best runners-up.

West Asia Region

- Iraq
- Jordan
- Lebanon
- Syria

Gulf Region

- Bahrain
- Kuwait
- Oman
- United Arab Emirates

North Africa Region

- Algeria
- Libya
- Morocco
- Tunisia

Red Sea Region

- Egypt
- Sudan
- Saudi Arabia
- Yemen

- The second round was never played and the tournament was eventually canceled.

== Final round ==
The final tournament was cancelled because of no sponsor.
