= Yousuf Shaaban (footballer) =

Omani footballer

Personal information
- Full name: Yousuf Shaaban Al-Busaidi
- Date of birth: 4 November 1982 (age 44)
- Place of birth: Barka, Oman
- Height: 1.72 m (5 ft 8 in)
- Position: Forward

Team information
- Current team: Dhofar

Senior career*
Years	Team	Apps	(Gls)
2002–2011	Dhofar	?	(7)
2011–2013	Al-Shabab	?	(6)
2013–2014	Dhofar		

International career
2003–2007	Oman	25	(3)
- * Club domestic league appearances and goals

Yousuf Shaaban Al-Busaidi (Arabic: يوسف شعبان يوسف شعبان البوسعيدي; born 4 November 1984), commonly known as Yousuf Shaaban, is an Omani footballer who plays for Dhofar S.C.S.C.

== Club career ==
In 2011, he moved to Barka-based club Al-Shabab Club and played for two seasons scoring 6 goals. On 24 September 2013, Yousuf signed a one-year contract with his first most club Dhofar S.C.S.C. On 24 July 2013, he again signed a contract with his former club Al-Shabab Club.

== International career ==
Yousuf was part of the first team squad of the Oman national football team till 2008. He was selected for the national team for the first time in 2004. He has made appearances in the 2004 AFC Asian Cup qualification, the 2004 AFC Asian Cup, the 2007 AFC Asian Cup qualification, the 2007 AFC Asian Cup and the 19th Arabian Gulf Cup.

=== FIFA World Cup Qualification ===
Yousuf has made four appearances in the 2006 FIFA World Cup qualification. His only goal for Oman in FIFA World Cup qualification matches came in the second round of 2006 FIFA World Cup qualification in a 2-0 win over Singapore.

== National team career statistics ==
=== Goals for senior national team ===
Scores and results list Oman's goal tally first.

#	Date	Venue	Opponent	Score	Result	Competition
1	28 January 2013	Muscat, Oman	Norway	1-0	1-0	Friendly
2	3 September 2004	Malé, Maldives	Maldives	2-1	2-1	Friendly
3	8 September 2004	Jalan Besar Stadium, Kallang, Singapore	Singapore	1-0	2-0	2006 FIFA World Cup qualification
