= Anon Nanok =

Thai footballer (born 1983)

Personal information
- Full name: Anon Nanok
- Date of birth: 30 March 1983 (age 43)
- Place of birth: Nakhon Ratchasima, Thailand
- Height: 1.78 m (5 ft 10 in)
- Position: Defender

Senior career*
Years	Team	Apps	(Gls)
2004–2006	Krung Thai Bank	45	(2)
2007–2008	TTM Phichit	29	(0)
2009–2010	Police United	6	(0)
2011	Chainat	26	(2)
2012–2014	Chiangrai United	37	(0)
2013	→ Air Force AVIA (loan)	16	(0)
2015	Nakhon Ratchasima	0	(0)
2015	→ Thai Honda (loan)	14	(0)
2015	→ TOT (loan)	6	(0)
2016	Udon Thani	3	(0)
2016	Phayao	8	(0)
Total		190	(4)

International career
2004	Thailand	6	(1)
- * Club domestic league appearances and goals

Anon Nanok (Thai: อานนท์ นานอก, born 30 March 1983), simply known as Do (Thai: โด้), is a former football defender from Thailand. He also was a former player in Thailand national team who scored 1 goal for the national team.

== Club career ==
=== Police United ===
Anon, as assigned by head coach, Chaiyong, was the team captain for the club Police United to take care of friends on either team and off the field is important that the Police United. Back to the top league of the country again in 2010.

== International goals ==
#	Date	Venue	Opponent	Score	Result	Competition
1.	October 13, 2004	Bangkok, Thailand	United Arab Emirates	2–0	3–0	2006 FIFA World Cup qualification

== Honours ==
=== Club ===
Police United

- Thai Division 1 League Champions (1) : 2009

Air Force AVIA

- Thai Division 1 League Champions (1) : 2013
