= Sin Yong-nam =

North Korean footballer

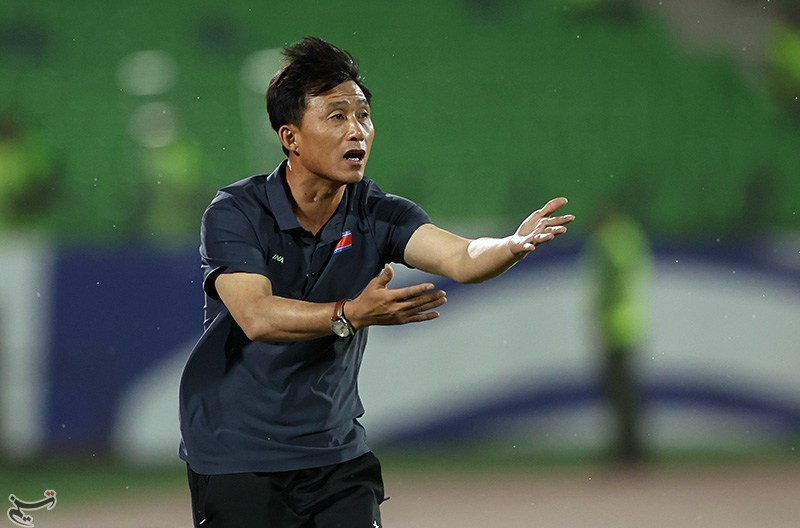
- Sin managing North Korea in 2025

Personal information
- Full name: Sin Yong-Nam
- Date of birth: 23 January 1978 (age 48)
- Place of birth: Hamhung, North Korea
- Height: 1.74 m (5 ft 9 in)
- Position: Midfielder

Team information
- Current team: North Korea / Ryomyong (head coach)

Senior career*
Years	Team	Apps	(Gls)
–2007	April 25		
2008–2014	Amrokgang		

International career
2004–2010	North Korea	15	(2)

Managerial career
- 2019–?: Ryomyong
- 2023: North Korea U23
- 2023–: North Korea
- 2025–: Ryomyong
- * Club domestic league appearances and goals

Sin Yong-Nam (born 23 January 1978) is a North Korean former footballer who is currently the head coach of the North Korea national football team and Ryomyong. Sin made seven appearances for the North Korean national team in 2006 FIFA World Cup qualifying matches.

Sin coached the North Korea national team. In 2025, he became the head coach of Ryomyong.

== Career statistics ==
=== International ===
==== International goals ====
No.	Date	Venue	Opponent	Score	Result	Competition
1.	19 June 2007	Macau Stadium, Macau, China	Mongolia	5–0	7–0	East Asian Cup 2008 qualification
