= Ilham Jaya Kesuma =

Indonesian footballer

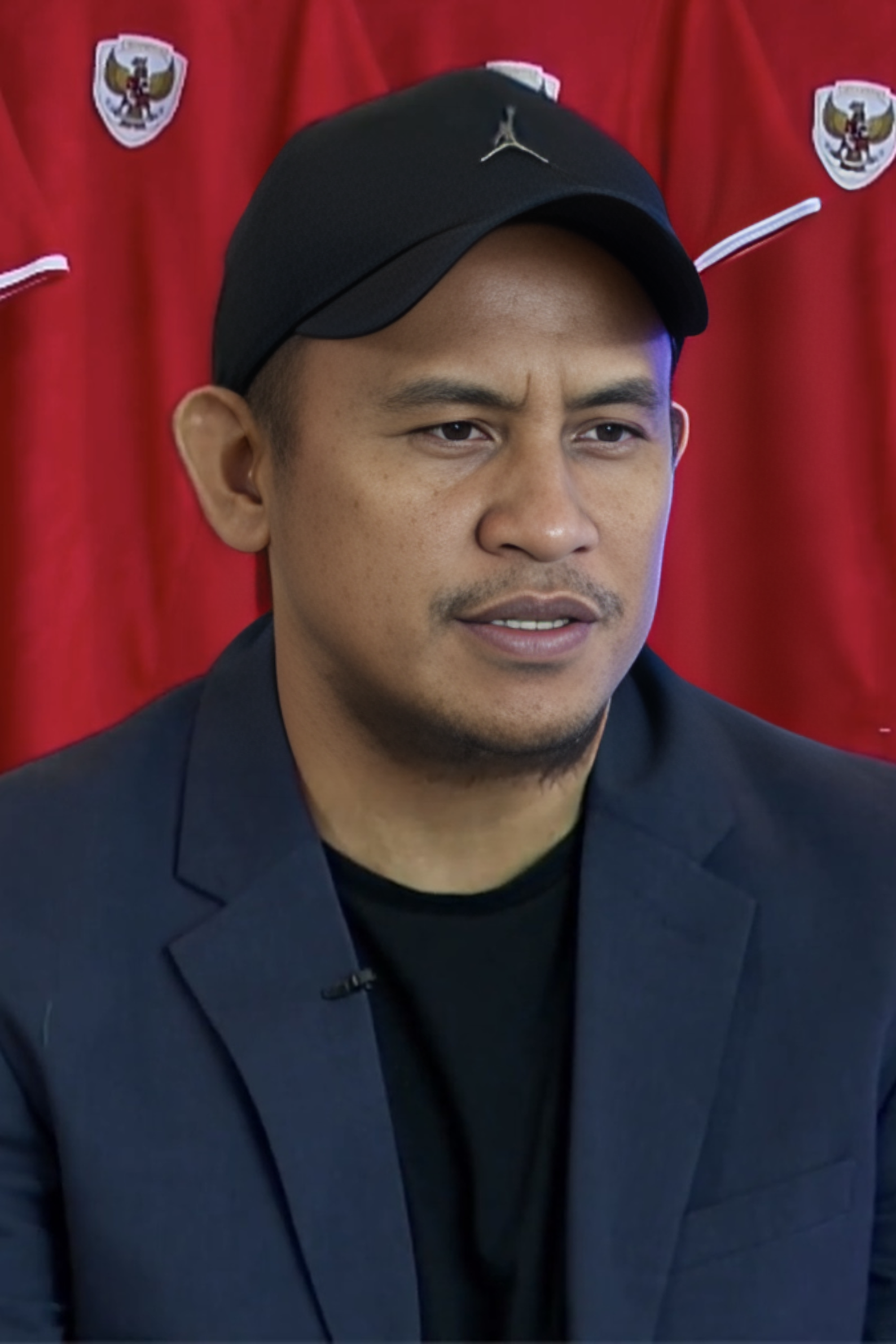
- Ilham in 2024

Personal information
- Date of birth: 19 September 1978 (age 48)
- Place of birth: Palembang, Indonesia
- Height: 1.73 m (5 ft 8 in)
- Position: Striker

Youth career
- 1995–1996: PS Palembang

Senior career*
Years	Team	Apps	(Gls)
1996–2006	Persita Tangerang	131	(92)
2006–2007	MPPJ Selangor	18	(7)
2007–2008	Persita Tangerang	25	(4)
2008–2009	Persisam Putra Samarinda	28	(9)
2009–2010	Persita Tangerang	14	(5)
2010–2011	Mitra Kukar	8	(1)
2011–2012	Sriwijaya	0	(0)
Total		224	(118)

International career
2004–2007	Indonesia	18	(13)

Managerial career
- 2019–2020: Persita Tangerang (Assistant coach)
- 2020: Persita Tangerang U-18
- * Club domestic league appearances and goals

Ilham Jaya Kesuma (born 19 September 1978) is a former Indonesian professional footballer who last played as a striker for Sriwijaya in Indonesia Super League.

Ilham was born in Palembang and played youth football with PS Palembang. Ilham starting his professional career with Persita. He is top scorer in Tiger Cup 2004 with 7 goal for Indonesia. He was also topscorer in Liga Indonesia 2004 with 22 goals.

== Honours ==
Persita Tangerang

- Liga Indonesia First Division: 2000
- Liga Indonesia Premier Division runner up: 2002

Persisam Putra Samarinda

- Liga Indonesia Premier Division: 2008–09

Indonesia

- AFF Championship runner-up: 2004
- Pestabola Merdeka runner-up: 2006

Individual

- AFF Championship Top scorer: 2004
- Liga Indonesia Premier Division Top Goalscorer: 2002, 2004
- Liga Indonesia Premier Division Best Player: 2002

== International goals ==
Ilham Jaya Kesuma: International goals
No.	Date	Venue	Opponent	Score	Result	Competition
1	8 September 2004	Sugathadasa Stadium, Colombo, Sri Lanka	Sri Lanka	1–0	2–2	2006 FIFA World Cup qualification
2	12 October 2004	Gelora Bung Karno Stadium, Jakarta, Indonesia	Saudi Arabia	1–2	1–3	2006 FIFA World Cup qualification
3	17 November 2004	Gelora Bung Karno Stadium, Jakarta, Indonesia	Turkmenistan	1–0	3–1	2006 FIFA World Cup qualification
4	17 November 2004	Gelora Bung Karno Stadium, Jakarta, Indonesia	Turkmenistan	2–1	3–1	2006 FIFA World Cup qualification
5	17 November 2004	Gelora Bung Karno Stadium, Jakarta, Indonesia	Turkmenistan	3–1	3–1	2006 FIFA World Cup qualification
6	7 December 2004	Thong Nhat Stadium, Ho Chi Minh City, Vietnam	Laos	2–0	6–0	2004 Tiger Cup
7	7 December 2004	Thong Nhat Stadium, Ho Chi Minh City, Vietnam	Laos	3–0	6–0	2004 Tiger Cup
8	11 December 2004	Mỹ Đình National Stadium, Hanoi, Vietnam	Vietnam	2–0	3–0	2004 Tiger Cup
9	13 December 2004	Mỹ Đình National Stadium, Hanoi, Vietnam	Cambodia	1–0	8–0	2004 Tiger Cup
10	13 December 2004	Mỹ Đình National Stadium, Hanoi, Vietnam	Cambodia	3–0	8–0	2004 Tiger Cup
11	13 December 2004	Mỹ Đình National Stadium, Hanoi, Vietnam	Cambodia	5–0	8–0	2004 Tiger Cup
12	3 January 2005	Bukit Jalil National Stadium, Kuala Lumpur, Malaysia	Malaysia	3–1	4–1	2004 Tiger Cup
13	17 January 2007	Singapore National Stadium, Kallang, Singapore	Singapore	1–1	2–2	2007 AFF Championship
