= Mohamad Yehya Al-Rashed =

Syrian footballer (born 1982)

Mohamad Yehya Al Rashed محمد يحيى الراشد
Personal information
- Date of birth: February 1, 1982 (age 44)
- Place of birth: Aleppo, Syria
- Height: 1.81 m (5 ft 11 in)
- Position: Midfielder

Team information
- Current team: Hutteen

Youth career
- Al-Ittihad

Senior career*
Years	Team	Apps	(Gls)
2000–2001	Al-Ittihad		
2001–2003	Al-Jaish		
2003–2009	Al-Ittihad		
2009–2010	Teshrin		
2010	Tersana		
2010–2011	Al-Wahda		
2011	Al-Horriya		
2013	Al-Kahraba	7	(0)
2013–2014	Hutteen		

International career
2002–2010	Syria		
- * Club domestic league appearances and goals

Mohamad Yehya Al Rashed (Arabic: محمد يحيى الراشد; born February 1, 1982) is a Syrian professional footballer who is currently playing for Hutteen in the Syrian Premier League. He is a former member of the Syria national team.

Al-Rashed played for Al-Ittihad in the 2006 AFC Champions League group stage.
