= Nguyễn Minh Hải =

Vietnamese footballer

Personal information
- Full name: Nguyễn Minh Hải
- Date of birth: 9 January 1994 (age 32)
- Place of birth: Ba Vì, Hanoi, Vietnam
- Height: 1.81 m (5 ft 11 in)
- Position: Defender

Team information
- Current team: Đồng Tháp
- Number: 19

Youth career
- 2006–2014: Hà Nội

Senior career*
| Years | Team | Apps | (Gls) |
| 2015–2018 | Hà Nội | 12 | (0) |
| 2019– | Đồng Tháp | 23 | (0) |

International career
| 2014–2015 | Vietnam U20 | 6 | (0) |
| 2015–2016 | Vietnam U21 | 2 | (0) |
| | Vietnam | ? | (1) |
- * Club domestic league appearances and goals

Nguyễn Minh Hải (born 9 January 1994) is a Vietnamese footballer who plays as a defender for V.League 2 club Đồng Tháp.

== Honours ==
=== Club ===
Hà Nội F.C.

- V.League 1:

(gold) Winners : 2016
(silver) Runners-up : 2015
(bronze) Third place : 2017

- Vietnamese Super Cup:

(silver) Runners-up : 2015, 2016

- Vietnamese National Cup:

(silver) Runners-up : 2015, 2016
