= Nontapan Jeansatawong =

Thai footballer (born 1982)

Personal information
- Full name: Nontapan Jeansatawong
- Date of birth: 9 February 1982 (age 44)
- Place of birth: Bangkok, Thailand
- Height: 1.72 m (5 ft 7 1/2 in)
- Positions: Left back; left midfielder

Senior career*
Years	Team	Apps	(Gls)
2003–2008	TOT	96	(11)
2009	Nakhon Pathom	22	(2)
2010	Thai Port	16	(2)
2010	Police United	10	(1)
2011	Muangthong United	9	(1)
2011	Esan United	21	(0)
2012–2013	→ Phuket (loan)	18	(4)
2013	Nakhon Ratchasima	4	(0)
2014	Nakhon Pathom United	19	(1)
2015	Ayutthaya	22	(3)
2016	Lampang	13	(0)
2018–2019	Phuket City	19	(0)
2020	Saraburi United	10	(0)
Total		279	(25)

International career
1999	Thailand U17	3	(0)
2004	Thailand	4	(1)
- * Club domestic league appearances and goals

Nontapan Jeansatawong (Thai: นนทพันธ์ เจียรสถาวงศ์) is a former professional footballer from Thailand.

== International goals ==
#	Date	Venue	Opponent	Score	Result	Competition
1.	October 13, 2004	Bangkok, Thailand	United Arab Emirates	3 - 0	Won	2006 FIFA World Cup qualification

== Honours ==
=== Club ===
TOT S.C.

- Thai Division 1 League Champions (1) : 2003

Thai Port F.C.

- Thai League Cup Winner (1) : 2010
