= Yousef Sheikh Al-Eshra =

Syrian footballer (born 1979)

Personal information
- Date of birth: 15 January 1979 (age 47)
- Place of birth: Syria
- Height: 1.78 m (5 ft 10 in)
- Position: Defender

Senior career*
Years	Team	Apps	(Gls)
2003–2004	Qardaha		
2004–2010	Al-Ittihad		
2010–2015	Omayya		

International career
- Syria
- * Club domestic league appearances and goals

Yousef Sheikh Al-Eshra (Arabic: يوسف شيخ العشرة; born 15 January 1979) is a Syrian footballer who played for Syria national football team.
