= Vyacheslav Amin =

Kyrgyzstani footballer

Personal information
- Date of birth: 10 December 1976 (age 49)
- Place of birth: Soviet Union
- Position: Defender

Senior career*
Years	Team	Apps	(Gls)
1992–1993	Kokart Jalalabad	?	(?)
1994–2005	Alga\SKA PVO Bishkek	?	(?)
2002	FC Jetisu	?	(?)
2006–2009	Abdish-Ata Kant	?	(?)

International career^{‡}
2000–2009	Kyrgyzstan	38	(1)
- * Club domestic league appearances and goals as of 31 December 2018 ‡ National team caps and goals as of 31 December 2018

Vyacheslav Amin (born 10 December 1976) is a retired Kyrgyzstani footballer who is a defender. He is well known for playing for Alga\SKA PVO\SKA-Shoro Bishkek and Abdish-Ata Kant. He was a member of the Kyrgyzstan national football team.
