= Roberto Kettlun =

Footballer (born 1981)

Personal information
- Full name: Roberto Karin Kettlun Pesce
- Date of birth: 25 July 1981 (age 45)
- Place of birth: Santiago, Chile
- Position: Midfielder

Youth career
- Universidad Católica

Senior career*
Years	Team	Apps	(Gls)
2001	Universidad Católica	0	(0)
2002–2005	Palestino	50	(4)
2003–2004	→ Skoda Xanthi (loan)	4	(1)
2006–2007	Unión Española	1	(1)
2007–2009	Brindisi	34	(2)
2009	Santegidiese	11	(5)
2009–2010	Teramo		
2010	Olympia Agnonese		
2010–2011	Virtus Casarano	9	(1)
2011–2012	Brindisi	12	(1)
2012–2014	Hilal Al-Quds		
2015–2016	Ahli Al-Khaleel	5	(0)

International career
2002–2003	Palestine U23		
2002–2006	Palestine	23	(3)
- * Club domestic league appearances and goals

Roberto Karin Kettlun Pesce (Arabic: روبيرتو كارين كاتلون بيشي; born 25 July 1981) is a former footballer who played as a midfielder. Born in Chile, he played for the Palestine national team.

== Career ==
Kettlun played club football in Chile, Greece and Italy.

In Chile, Kettlun played for Universidad Católica, Palestino and Unión Española. In 2002–2003, he played for Greek club Skoda Xanthi.

In Italy, Kettlun played for Brindisi, Santegidiese, Teramo, Olympia Agnonese and Virtus Casarano at minor categories.

In 2012, Kettlun moved to Palestinian club Hilal Al-Quds.

He also earned more than 20 caps for Palestine, scoring three goals in FIFA World Cup qualifying. He also represented the under-23's at the 2004 Summer Olympics Qualifiers.

== Post-retirement ==
Kettlun has served as sport manager of Palestino.

In August 2024, Kettlun served as representative of Palestino in front of Nasser Al-Khelaifi, the president of French club Paris Saint-Germain, with views to future cooperation.
