= Toshiya Fujita =

Toshiya Fujita may refer to:

- Toshiya Fujita (director) (1932–1997), Japanese film director, film actor, and screenwriter
- Toshiya Fujita (footballer) (born 1971), Japanese former professional footballer
