= Isuru Perera =

Sri Lankan cricketer (born 1984)

Personal information
- Full name: Marasinghe Arachchilage Isuru Maduranga Perera
- Born: 15 September 1984 (age 42)
- Source: Cricinfo, 18 December 2017

Isuru Perera (born 15 September 1984) is a Sri Lankan cricketer. He made his first-class debut for Chilaw Marians Cricket Club in the 2005–06 Premier Trophy on 6 January 2006.

== See also ==
- List of Chilaw Marians Cricket Club players
