= Hussain Seraj =

Kuwaiti footballer

Personal information
- Date of birth: 28 June 1982 (age 44)
- Place of birth: Kuwait
- Height: 1.81 m (5 ft 11 in)
- Position: Forward

Senior career*
Years	Team	Apps	(Gls)
1999–2011	Al-Fahaheel FC		
2011–2012	Al Shabab		
2013–2014	Al Sahel		
2014–2015	Al Fahaheel		

International career
2004	Kuwait	5	(2)
- * Club domestic league appearances and goals

Hussain Seraj is a Kuwaiti football forward who played for Kuwait in the 2004 Asian Cup. He also played for Al-Fahaheel FC.
