= Kwok Yue Hung =

Hong Kong footballer (born 1975)

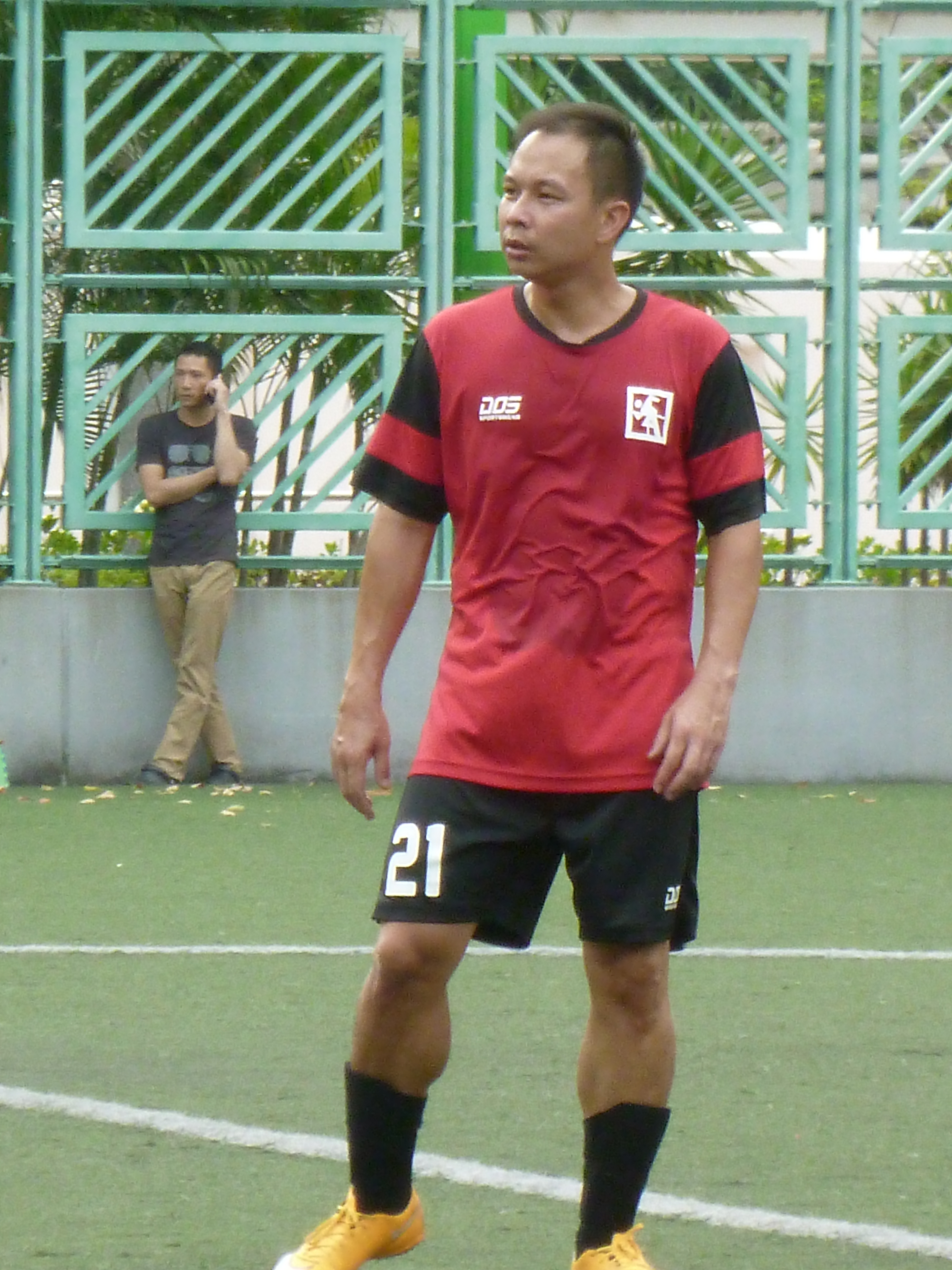

Personal information
- Date of birth: 28 February 1975 (age 51)
- Place of birth: Hong Kong
- Positions: Winger; striker

Team information
- Current team: Sha Tin

Senior career*
| Years | Team | Apps | (Gls) |
| –2005 | Happy Valley | 118 | (26) |
| 2005–2007 | Kitchee | 40 | (4) |
| 2007–2008 | Sha Tin | 23 | (24) |
| 2008–2009 | Sun Hei | 16 | (1) |
| 2009–2010 | Wing Yee | | |
| 2010–2015 | Sha Tin | 92 | (12) |
| 2015–2017 | Fu Moon | | |
| 2017–2019 | South China | 34 | (0) |
| 2019–2022 | Wing Go | | |
| 2022–2023 | Sha Tin | 9 | (1) |
| 2023–2025 | Wing Go | 17 | (1) |
| 2025– | Sha Tin | 1 | (0) |

International career
| 1996–2005 | Hong Kong | 32 | (3) |
- * Club domestic league appearances and goals

Kwok Yue Hung (Chinese: 郭裕洪; born 28 February 1975) is a Hong Kong former footballer who played as a winger or striker.

== Early life ==
Kwok started playing football in fifth grade of elementary school. He started playing eleven-a-side football at the age of sixteen.

== Career ==
Kwok started his career with Hong Kong side Happy Valley. He helped the club win the league.

== Personal life ==
Kwok was born in 1975 in Hong Kong. He has been nicknamed "Little Chicken".
