= Nawaf Al Humaidan =

Kuwaiti footballer

Personal information
- Full name: Nawaf Abdullah Al Humaidan
- Date of birth: March 8, 1981 (age 45)
- Place of birth: Kuwait City, Kuwait
- Height: 1.63 m (5 ft 4 in)
- Position: Midfielder

Team information
- Current team: Kazma

Senior career*
Years	Team	Apps	(Gls)
1997–2014	Kazma	346	(40)

International career^{‡}
2004–2007	Kuwait	14	(0)
- * Club domestic league appearances and goals as of October 29, 2010 ‡ National team caps and goals as of October 29, 2010

Nawaf Al Humaidan (Arabic: نواف الحميدان, born 8 March 1981) is a Kuwaiti footballer who is a midfielder for the Kuwaiti Premier League club Kazma.
