= Sayed Ali Bechir =

Qatari footballer (born 1982)

Sayed Bechir
Personal information
- Full name: Sayetali alsabal
- Date of birth: 6 September 1982 (age 44)
- Place of birth: Teyarett, Mauritania
- Height: 1.80 m (5 ft 11 in)
- Position: Striker

Senior career*
Years	Team	Apps	(Gls)
2000–2009	Al Arabi		(34)
2009–2010	Al Rayyan	14	(2)
2010–2011	Umm Salal	7	(2)
2011–2012	Al Wakrah	8	(2)

International career^{‡}
2001–2009	Qatar	67	(20)
- * Club domestic league appearances and goals ‡ National team caps and goals as of March 22, 2024

Sayed Ali Bechir (Arabic: سيد علي البشير; born at 6 September 1982) is a former football player. Born in Mauritania, he represented the Qatar national team.

Bechir played for Qatar at the 1999 FIFA U-17 World Championship in New Zealand. He played for the Qatari club Al-Arabi before playing for Al-Rayyan Sports club. He scored one of the unforgettable goals for Qatari fans against Iraq in the FIFA World Cup South Africa 2010 qualifiers which made Qatar complete the Qualifications till the last round.
