= Mahmoud Chahoud =

Lebanese footballer

Personal information
- Date of birth: 9 October 1976 (age 50)
- Height: 1.86 m (6 ft 1 in)
- Position: Forward

Senior career*
Years	Team	Apps	(Gls)
1999–2004	Ahed		(27)
2004–2007	Ansar		(13)
2007–2009	Sagesse		(1)
2009–2010	Ahli Saida		(2)
Total			(43)

International career
2000–2004	Lebanon	19	(4)
- * Club domestic league appearances and goals

Mahmoud Chahoud (Arabic: محمود شحود; born 3 February 1976) is a Lebanese former footballer who played as a forward.

Chahoud began his career at Ahed in 1999, before joining Ansar in 2004. He won two consecutive domestic doubles, during the 2005–06 and 2006–07 seasons. In 2007 Chahoud moved to Sagesse, before joining Ahli Saida in 2009; he retired in 2010.

Chahoud represented Lebanon internationally between 2000 and 2004, scoring four goals in 19 matches.

== Club career ==
Chahoud began his senior career at Lebanese Premier League side Ahed, during the 1999–2000 season. The Lebanese forward helped his side win their first ever major trophy, a Lebanese FA Cup in 2003–04. Chahoud remained at Ahed for five seasons, scoring 27 league goals in the process.

On 8 November 2004, Chahoud joined Ansar. In 2005–06 and 2006–07, Chahoud helped his side win two consecutive domestic doubles, winning both the league and FA Cup in both seasons. After three seasons at Ansar, during which he scored 13 league goals, Chahoud moved to Sagesse, on 4 June 2007. On 11 October 2009, Chahoud moved to newly promoted Ahli Saida, where he retired after the 2009–10 season.

== International career ==
Chahoud made his senior international debut for Lebanon on 23 February 2000, in a friendly against Jordan. The match ended in a 1–1 draw. Chahoud's first international goal came almost four years later, in a friendly against Bahrain on 8 February 2004. Chahoud scored the 1–1 equalizer on the 91st minute, with Nasrat Al Jamal scoring the winning goal one minute later.

Between 8 September 2004, and 6 October 2004, Chahoud scored a goal in three consecutive matches. Respectively, in a 2006 FIFA World Cup qualifier against the Maldives, and in two successive friendlies against Kuwait. Chahoud ended his international career in 2004, with four goals in 16 games.

== Career statistics ==
=== International ===
Scores and results list Lebanon's goal tally first, score column indicates score after each Chahoud goal.

List of international goals scored by Mahmoud Chahoud
No.	Date	Venue	Opponent	Score	Result	Competition	Ref.
1	8 February 2004	Camille Chamoun Sports City Stadium, Beirut, Lebanon	Bahrain	1–1	2–1	Friendly	
2	8 September 2004	Galolhu Rasmee Dhandu Stadium, Malé, Maldives	Maldives	4–0	5–2	2006 FIFA World Cup qualification	
3	3 October 2004	Lebanon	Kuwait	1–1	1–3	Friendly	
4	6 October 2004	Beirut Municipal Stadium, Beirut, Lebanon	Kuwait	1–0	1–1	Friendly	

== Honours ==
Ahed

- Lebanese FA Cup: 2003–04

Ansar

- Lebanese Premier League: 2005–06, 2006–07
- Lebanese FA Cup: 2005–06, 2006–07
