= Ali Nasseredine =

Lebanese footballer (born 1983)

Personal information
- Full name: Ali Hassan Nasseredine
- Date of birth: 24 January 1983 (age 43)
- Place of birth: Kuwait
- Height: 1.82 m (6 ft 0 in)
- Position: Striker

Youth career
- 1997–2002: Nejmeh

Senior career*
Years	Team	Apps	(Gls)
2002–2010	Nejmeh		(52)
2010–2011	Ansar		(7)
2011–2012	Al-Jazeera	10	(0)
2012	Bahrain		(1)
2012–2013	Ansar	16	(5)
2013–2014	Safa	18	(6)
2014–2015	Nabi Chit	18	(4)
2015–2016	Chabab Ghazieh	15	(0)
2016–2017	Safa	7	(1)
Total		?	(76)

International career
2003–2006	Lebanon	22	(9)
- * Club domestic league appearances and goals

Ali Hassan Nasseredine (Arabic: علي حسن ناصر الدين; born 24 January 1983) is a former footballer who played as a striker. Born in Kuwait, he played for the Lebanon national team between 2003 and 2006, scoring eight goals in 19 caps.

Coming through from the youth system, Nasseredine made his senior debut for Nejmeh during the 2002–03 season. After eight seasons for the club, with whom he scored 52 league goals, in 2010 Nasseredine moved to cross-city rivals Ansar for one season. The following year, he moved to Jordanian side Al-Jazeera, before joining Bahrain SC in 2012. The same year, he returned to Lebanon, playing one season each for Ansar, Safa, Nabi Chit and Chabab Ghazieh. Nasseredine played his final season in 2016–17 with Safa, ending his career with 76 league goals.

== Club career ==
=== Nejmeh ===
On 31 October 1997, Nasseredine signed for Nejmeh's youth sector.

When Nejmeh took part in the 2004 AFC Cup, Nasseredine scored a brace against Yemen's Al Sha'ab Ibb to win 3–0 in their opening group stage fixture on 11 February 2004. On 6 April 2004, he netted once more in a 3–1 win against Turkmenistan's Nisa Aşgabat, as Nejmeh went on to eventually top the group with 16 points. They met Syria's Al-Wahda in the quarter-final. Nasseredine scored in the 3–2 second-leg victory on 21 September 2004; however, the Syrians advanced on the away goals rule.

The following year saw Nejmeh top their group again in the 2005 AFC Cup, where Nasseredine scored in the quarter-finals in a 3–2 win against Singapore's Home United FC. On 28 September 2005, Nasseredine scored the third goal in a first-leg semi-final 3–0 win against Hong Kong's Sun Hei. Two weeks later, on 12 October 2005 Nasseredine scored again in a 3–2 second-leg victory which saw Nejmeh advance to the final, where they lost 4–2 on aggregate against Jordan's Al-Faisaly Amman. During the 2005–06 Lebanese Premier League season, Nasseredine finished as the league's leading goal scorer with 17 goals.

In the 2006 AFC Cup, Nasseredine scored a hat-trick in Nejmeh's opening game, a 6–2 thrashing against Turkmenistan's HTTU Aşgabat on 7 March 2006. On 16 May 2006, he scored a 65th-minute winning goal in a 2–1 result against Jordan's Al Faisaly, in the final group stage fixture. On 26 September 2006, in the first leg of the semi-finals, Nasseredine put Nejmeh ahead against Bahrain's Al-Muharraq after 21 minutes, only to end up losing the game 2–1. Nejmeh lost 4–2 in the second leg.

In the 2007 AFC Cup, on 20 March 2007, Nasseredine scored an 89th-minute winner in a 2–1 victory against Al-Saqr of Yemen in the second group stage fixture. Nejmeh finished on top of their group on 15 points, having only lost once. Nejmeh went all the way to the semi-finals, where they were knocked out by Jordan's Shabab Al-Ordon Al-Qadisiya.

== International career ==
On 9 June 2004, Nasseredine was substituted on to the field in the 81st minute in a 2006 World Cup qualifier against the Maldives; he scored the third and final goal of a 3–0 victory in the 93rd minute. On 8 September 2004 Nasseredine scored a brace in Lebanon's 5–2 second-leg win against the Maldives.

On 13 October 2004, Lebanon played South Korea in their second last game for their group stage clash; with Lebanon being only one point below their opponents South Korea in the table, the game was seen as Lebanon's finest chance of qualifying to the second round of qualifiers for their first time. In front of a sold-out crowd in the Beirut Municipal Stadium, South Korea scored in opening goal in the 8th minute. Nasseredine equalised in the 28th minute. As the game had ended 1–1, the point was not enough to qualify.

On 22 February 2006, Nasseredine headed home an equaliser in the 70th minute in a qualifying match for the 2007 AFC Asian Cup against Kuwait at home.

== Honours ==
Nejmeh

- Lebanese Premier League: 2003–04, 2004–05, 2008–09
- Lebanese Elite Cup: 2002, 2003, 2004, 2005
- Lebanese Super Cup: 2002, 2004, 2009

Ansar

- Lebanese Super Cup: 2012

Safa

- Lebanese Super Cup: 2013

Individual

- Lebanese Premier League Best Goal: 2014–15
- Lebanese Premier League Team of the Season: 2003–04, 2005–06
- Lebanese Premier League top scorer: 2005–06

== See also ==
- List of Lebanon international footballers born outside Lebanon
