= Vietnam national football team =

Vietnam
- Nickname(s): Những chiến binh sao vàng (Golden Star Warriors)
- Association: Vietnam Football Federation (VFF)
- Confederation: AFC (Asia)
- Sub-confederation: AFF (Southeast Asia)
- Head coach: Kim Sang-sik
- Captain: Nguyễn Thành Chung
- Most caps: Nguyễn Quang Hải (88)
- Top scorer: Lê Công Vinh (51)
- Home stadium: Various
- FIFA code: VIE
First colours	Second colours

FIFA ranking
- Current: 99 (18 November 2026)
- Highest: 84 (September 1998)
- Lowest: 172 (December 2006)

First international
- as South Vietnam: Vietnam 3–3 South Korea (Saigon, French Cochinchina; 16 January 1949) as Vietnam: Vietnam 0–0 Kampuchea (Hanoi, Vietnam, 13 September 1983)

Biggest win
- Vietnam 11–0 Guam (Ho Chi Minh City, Vietnam; 23 January 2000)

Biggest defeat
- as South Vietnam: South Vietnam 1–9 Indonesia (Seoul, South Korea; 4 May 1971) as Vietnam: Zimbabwe 6–0 Vietnam (Kuala Lumpur, Malaysia; 26 February 1997); Oman 6–0 Vietnam (Daegu, South Korea; 29 September 2003); South Korea 6–0 Vietnam (Suwon, South Korea; 17 October 2023)

Asian Cup
- Appearances: 2 as South Vietnam (first in 1956); 4 as Vietnam (first in 2007)
- Best result: as South Vietnam: Fourth place (1956, 1960) as Vietnam: Quarter-finals (2007, 2019)

ASEAN Championship
- Appearances: 16 (first in 1996)
- Best result: Champions (2008, 2018, 2024, 2026)

Southeast Asian Games (Note: It has been for U23 teams since the 2001 tournament)
- Appearances: 7 as South Vietnam (first in 1959); 5 as Vietnam (first in 1991)
- Best result: as South Vietnam: Gold medals (1959) as Vietnam: Silver medals (1995, 1999)

Asian Games (Note: It has been for U23 teams since the 2002 tournament)
- Appearances: 5 as South Vietnam (first in 1954); 1 as Vietnam (first in 1998)
- Best result: as South Vietnam: Fourth place (1962) as Vietnam: Group stage (1998)
Medal record
ASEAN Championship
Gold medal – first place	2008 Indonesia/Thailand	Team
Gold medal – first place	2018 Southeast Asia	Team
Gold medal – first place	2024 Southeast Asia	Team
Gold medal – first place	2026 Southeast Asia	Team
Silver medal – second place	1998 Vietnam	Team
Silver medal – second place	2022 Southeast Asia	Team
Bronze medal – third place	1996 Singapore	Team
Bronze medal – third place	2002 Indonesia/Singapore	Team
Southeast Asian Games (after 1975)
Silver medal – second place	1995 Thailand	Team
Silver medal – second place	1999 Brunei	Team
Bronze medal – third place	1997 Singapore	Team
- Website: vff.org.vn

The Vietnam national football team (Vietnamese: Đội tuyển bóng đá quốc gia Việt Nam) is the national football team represents Vietnam in senior men's international football and is governed by the Vietnam Football Federation.

Football was introduced to Vietnam by the French in the late 19th century during the colonial period, and the country's first recorded international match took place in Saigon on 16 January 1949. During the 20th century, political division led to the existence of two separate national teams. South Vietnam as the State of Vietnam and Republic of Vietnam, governed by the Vietnam Football Association, joined FIFA in 1952 and the Asian Football Confederation (AFC) in 1954 before the country's division, and participated in tournaments such as the AFC Asian Cup. North Vietnam, as the Democratic Republic of Vietnam, only joined FIFA and the AFC in 1964 and mainly competed in friendly and solidarity tournaments with other communist nations. Following the reunification of North and South Vietnam in 1975 (officially in 1976), the football associations merged into the Vietnam Football Federation. Because both North and South Vietnam were members of FIFA, results of their national teams are counted as part of the overall record of the Vietnam national team.

After reunification, Vietnam did not field a senior national team in international competitions for over a decade. The country made its return at the 1991 SEA Games, marking its reintegration into regional football. Since then, Vietnam has emerged as one of Southeast Asia's strongest sides, winning the ASEAN Championship four times (2008, 2018, 2024, 2026) and regularly competing at continental level. The team reached the quarter-finals of the Asian Cup in 2007, when it co-hosted the tournament, and again in 2019. In the FIFA World Cup qualifiers, Vietnam advanced to the third round for the first time in 2022.

== History ==
=== Early history (1896–1949) ===
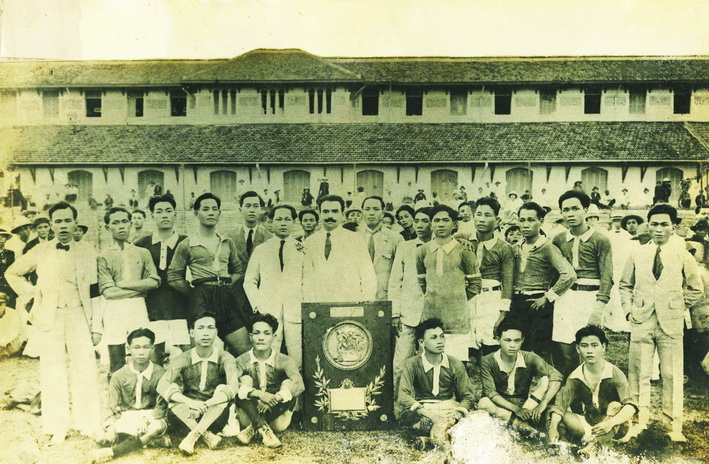
Early Vietnamese football with Vietnamese players and French colonial officials during the Championat de Cochinchine, 1920s.

The introduction of football into Vietnam can be traced back to 1896, during the era of colonial French Cochinchina in the South. At first, the sport was only played among French civil servants, merchants, and soldiers. The French encouraged natives to play football and other introduced sports, partly to divert their interest from politics but also because of local enthusiasm. Football subsequently spread to the northern and central regions. On 20 July 1908, the newspaper Southern Luc Tan Van reported on a match between two local Vietnamese teams for the first time. A football guidebook published in 1925 by Vietnamese doctor Pham Van Tiec attracted interest among Vietnamese youth. By 1928, the Vietnamese had established the Annamite Sports Bureau and in the same year they sent a football team to compete in British Singapore. More local football clubs then established in northern and southern Vietnam. However, it was not until after World War II that football clubs in the region started to become more organized.

Under French colonial rule, the French Indochina Football Federation hosted a few matches against other national teams, fielding a selection composed mainly of players from Saigon or the French Cochinchina football league. Notably, they faced the then-Republic of China in 1936 and 1948. In April 1947, the French Indochina Football Federation selection team went for a tour in British Hong Kong, and played against Hong Kong national team.

A few months before Vietnam gained independence as a unified country within the framework of the French Union, the earliest recognized international game of Vietnam was on 16 January 1949, in a 3–3 draw against South Korea in Saigon, French Cochinchina. This team would become South Vietnamese team following the political division of the country in 1954.

=== Two national teams (1949–1975) ===
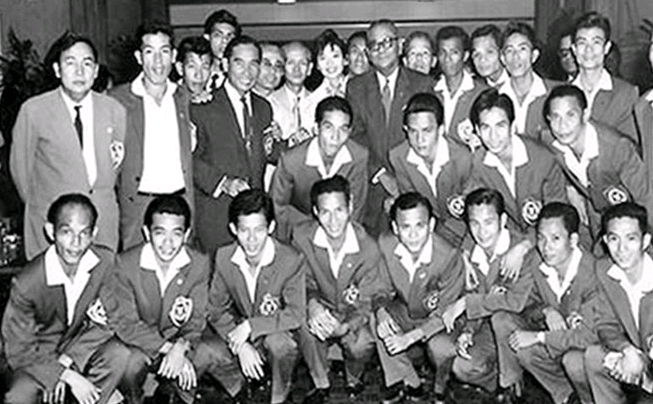
The South Vietnam team winning gold at the 1959 Southeast Asian Peninsular Games in Bangkok.

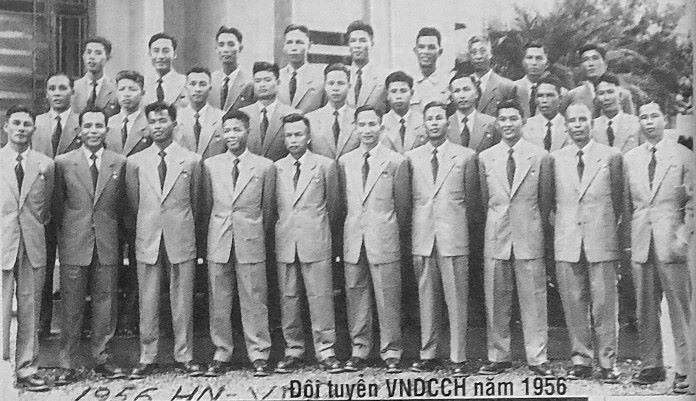
The North Vietnam team in 1956.

Two national football teams existed side by side from 1956 to 1975, during the period Vietnam was divided into North and South Vietnam (1954–75).

The southern team appeared in a friendly in 1949 and participated in the first two AFC Asian Cup finals (1956 AFC Asian Cup and 1960 AFC Asian Cup) and earned two fourth-place finishes. They won the first Southeast Asian Games gold in 1959 in Bangkok (Thailand) as well as two times won silver medals and three times won bronze medals. South Vietnam reached quarter-finals of the Asian Games 1958 and fourth place of the Asian Games 1962. South Vietnam even qualified for the 1956 Summer Olympics after defeating Cambodia in both home and away matches but then refused to participate in the finals in Australia. The team also attempted to qualify for the 1974 FIFA World Cup, beating Thailand 1–0 to qualify for the classification matches. They ultimately lost their group opening matches by 4–0 to Japan and 1–0 to Hong Kong. The team played their last game in a 0–3 loss against Malaysia in March 1975 and as a result of the de facto fall of South Vietnam in April, the team was disbanded. Despite the fierce wars, they were still one of strongest teams in Southeast Asia. Before the division, South Vietnamese football association became a member of FIFA in 1952 and the AFC in 1954.

Meanwhile, the northern team was much less active than the South and tended to be closed. North Vietnam only joined FIFA and the AFC in 1964. Between 1956 and 1974 they often played against other communist states. Their first game was a 5–3 lost to China under head coach Truong Tan Buu on 4 October 1956 and their played last game was a 3–2 win over Cuba. They participated in the first GANEFO (Games of the New Emerging Forces) competitions in Indonesia in 1962 and Cambodia in 1966. The team played their last game in 1974. North and South regions ceased to exist when they were reunited in 1975 with the end of the Vietnam War, and the reunification was formalized in 1976 with the establishment of Socialist Republic. Because both North and South Vietnam were members of FIFA, historical results of their national teams are counted as part of the overall record of the Vietnam national team.

The development of football during this era for both Vietnams stagnated due to the coincident Vietnam War. Having been a significant football force in the region, Vietnam's reputation diminished. The conflict also greatly reduced Vietnamese footballing ability and weakened the country generally. Moreover, the subsequent Cambodian–Vietnamese War and Sino–Vietnamese War, combined with global sanctions against the country, decimated sports in Vietnam as a whole. For these reasons, Vietnamese football remains new and unknown to much of the rest of the world. Despite its long-standing history of football, Vietnam only rejoined the global football community in 1991.

Vietnam's professional football league, known as the National A1 League, was launched in 1980 to redevelop Vietnamese football after the war. In 1989, following the Đổi Mới reforms, a new football federation was formed. Most Vietnamese sports returned to the international stage. After three months of preparation, in August 1989, the First Congress of the new football federation took place in Hanoi, declaring the formation of the Vietnam Football Federation. Trịnh Ngọc Chữ, deputy minister of the General Department of Sports, was elected as the first president of VFF.

=== Post-Vietnam War and redevelopment (1983–2006) ===
The reunified Vietnam national football team played its first international match on 13 September 1983 against the Cambodia national team in Hanoi. The match was attended by FIFA President João Havelange, who was visiting Vietnam at the time to promote the development of football in the country. After the match, Vietnam did not play any official international football matches for the next eight years.

Reunified Vietnam began continuous participation in international football starting with the 1991 edition of the Southeast Asian Games (SEA Games) in Manila, Philippines. They have participated in every subsequent SEA Games tournament. Since 1994, Vietnam has consistently participated in qualification for the FIFA World Cup, and in qualification for the AFC Asian Cup (since 1996).

Vietnam participated for the first time as a unified nation in FIFA World Cup qualification during the 1994 World Cup campaign, having participated in the 1974 qualification as South Vietnam. The national side failed to qualify for the 1994 and 1998 tournaments with only one qualifying win in total.

In 1996, Vietnam finished third in the first (1996) ASEAN Football Federation championship (then known as the Tiger Cup). Vietnam hosted the second Tiger Cup in 1998, losing 1–0 to Singapore in the final. From 2000 to 2007, Vietnam strove to win the Southeast Asian trophy, but invariably failed. In 1996, Vietnam created international headlines by inviting defending UEFA Champions League winners Juventus to play a friendly match in Hanoi. Despite the 2–1 loss, the match was a watershed moment that boosted the development of football in the country.

Vietnam was the host of the 1999 Dunhill Cup, a friendly tournament for both senior and U-23 players. Because it was categorized as a mingled senior and U-23 competition, some national teams decided to use their senior reserve sides. In this competition, Vietnam performed promisingly. The highlight was a shock 1–0 win over Russia (then-1994 FIFA World Cup and UEFA Euro 1996 participant); they also drew 2–2 with 1998 FIFA World Cup participant Iran, thereby topping the group. Vietnam was then eliminated in the semi-finals after a 4–1 defeat to China.

Vietnam's 2002 FIFA World Cup qualification campaign had some bright moments, with the team winning three matches and drawing one, all played in Dammam. However, the losses against Saudi Arabia, meant that Vietnam did not qualify for the World Cup. The 2004 AFC Asian Cup qualification was also unsuccessful, with Vietnam falling to South Korea and Oman, but managing to create a shock 1–0 win over 2002 FIFA World Cup's fourth-place-getter South Korea in Muscat, one of Vietnam's greatest football feats. The 2006 FIFA World Cup qualification was a low point for Vietnam, with the team once again failing, losing to South Korea and Lebanon, and only finishing above Maldives on goal difference.

=== Renaissance (2007–2009) ===
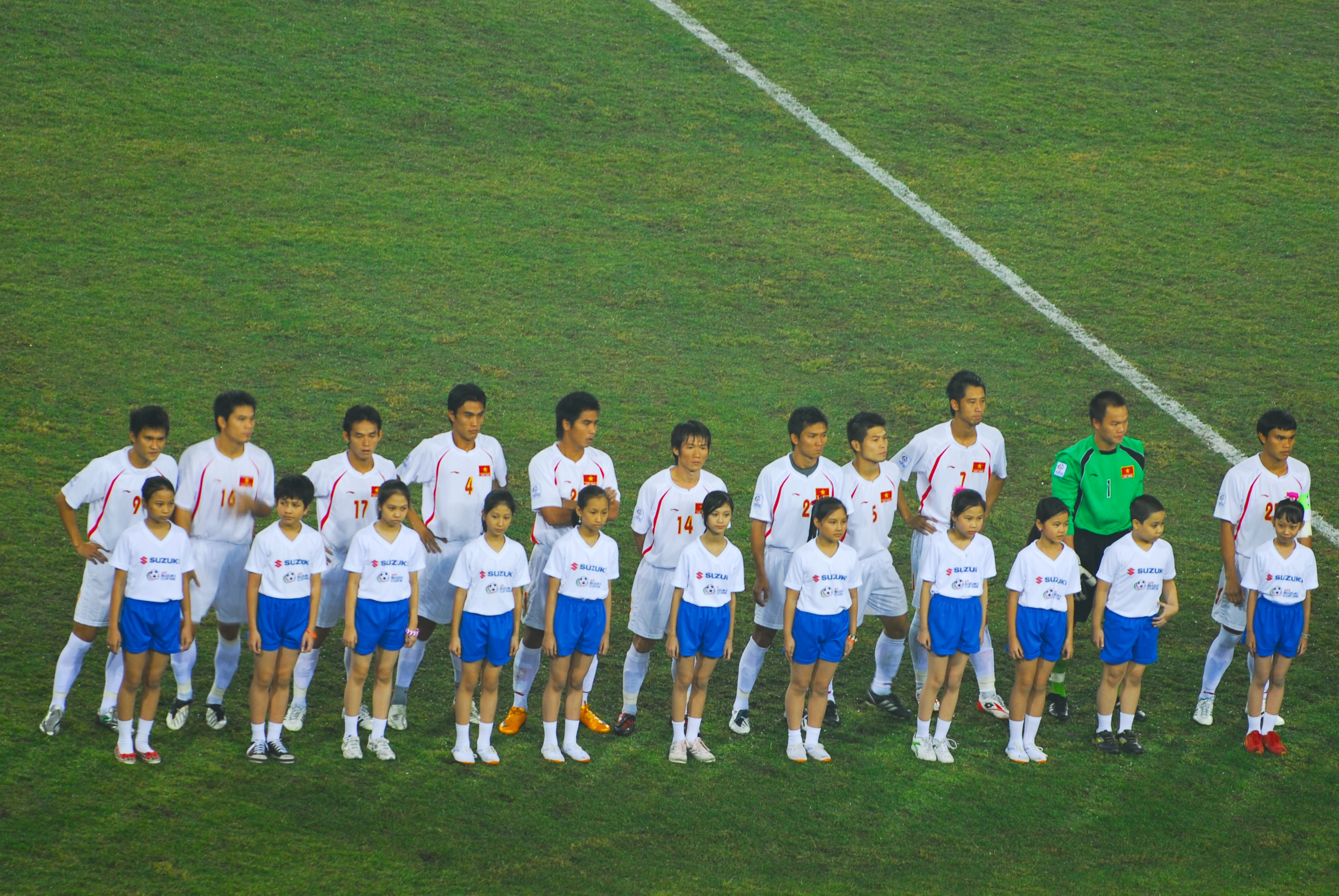
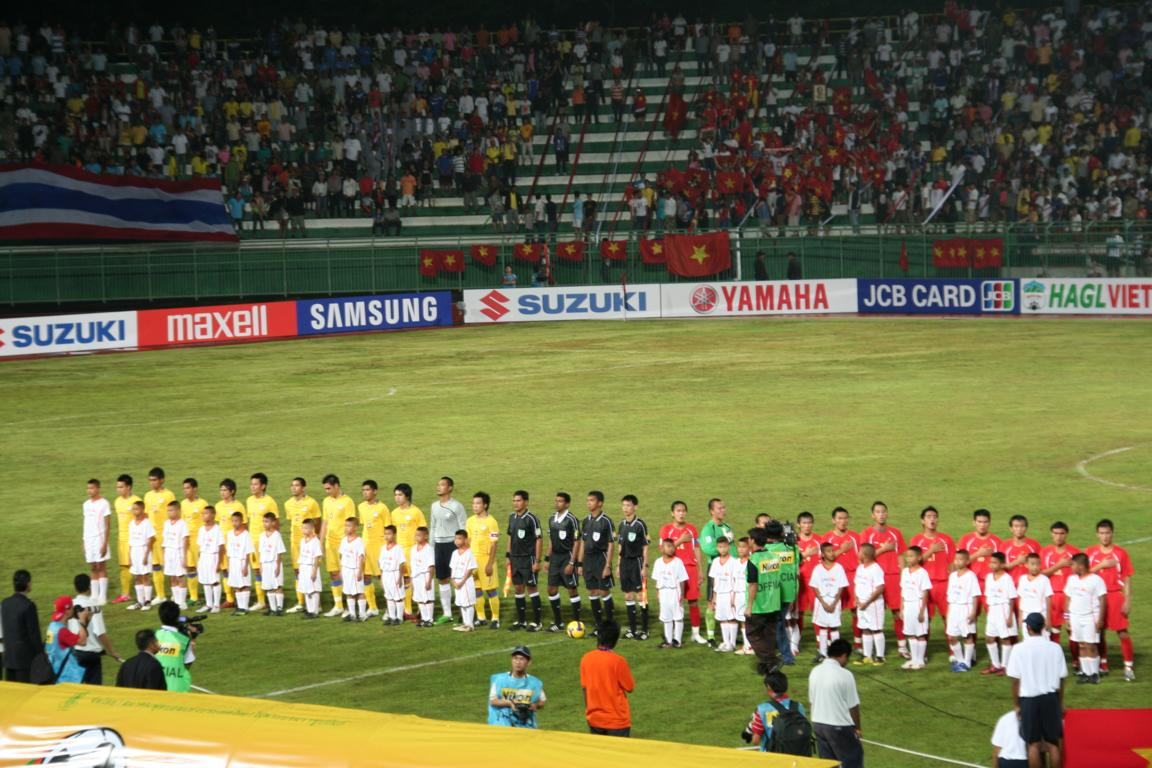
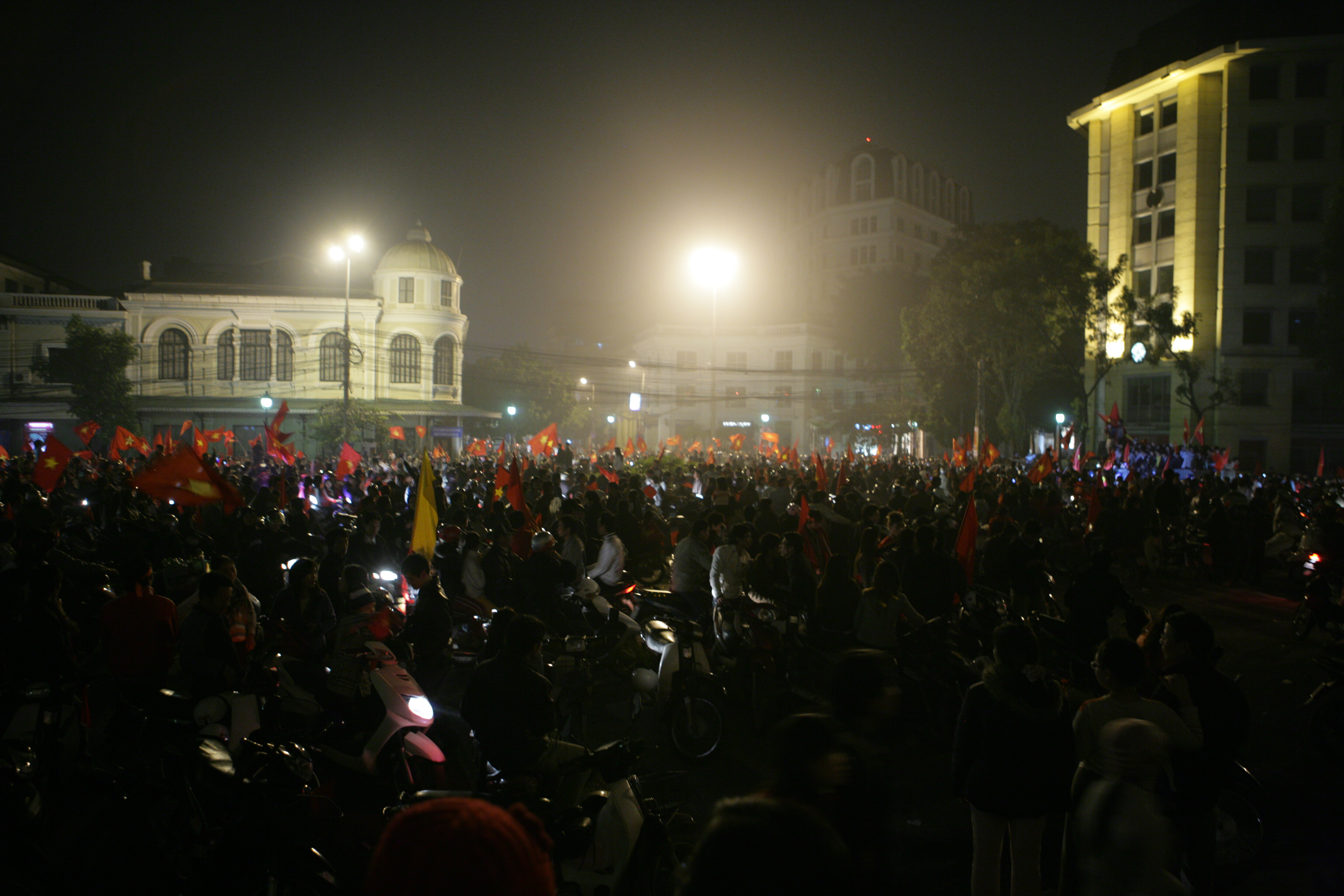
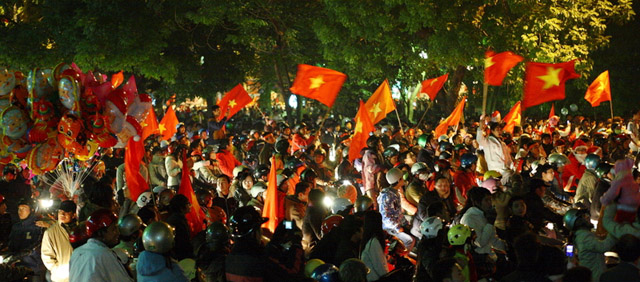
Scenes during the 2008 AFF Championship final. Clockwise from top right: Vietnamese team with Thailand in Group B match, Vietnamese supporters during and after Vietnam's triumph, and the Vietnamese team before the second leg final matches.

Vietnam's starting lineup in the second leg of the 2008 AFF Championship final.

Vietnam hosted the 2007 AFC Asian Cup along with Indonesia, Malaysia and Thailand, despite having failed to qualify for the Asian Cup since the 1990s. The team was ranked second lowest only after Malaysia, but Vietnam created a shock by defeating the UAE 2–0, drawing 1–1 with another Gulf team, Qatar, before losing 1–4 to defending champions Japan. Vietnam were the only Southeast Asian and host team to reach the quarter-finals, in which they lost to eventual champions Iraq 2–0. This marked the beginning of the first Vietnamese football upsurge.

Vietnam won their first AFF Championship title in 2008. They were placed in Group B with Thailand, Malaysia, and Laos. After losing to Thailand 2–0 in the opener, Vietnam defeated Malaysia 3–2 and Laos 4–0. In the semi-final, Vietnam held the defending champion Singapore to 0–0 at home before winning 1–0 away, making the final for the first time in 10 years. Vietnam met Thailand again in the final. They defeated Thailand 2-1 in the first leg in Thailand. Returning home, Vietnam salvaged a 1-1 draw by virtue of Lê Công Vinh's last-minute header, winning 3-2 on aggregate. This was the team's first international title since rejoining global football.

Vietnam almost managed a successful 2011 AFC Asian Cup qualification, performing well against Syria and Lebanon, as well as against China; but various shortcomings once again proved to be instrumental in denying Vietnam's qualification for the 2011 AFC Asian Cup, as the team finished third with only a single 3–1 home win (over Lebanon) and two draws away to both Levant opponents Syria and Lebanon. Losing both matches against China, including the huge 6–1 loss in Hangzhou, Vietnam at least had the slight consolation of scoring a single goal in both games.

=== Decline (2009–2014) ===
The period between 2009 and 2014 marked the decline of Vietnamese football. The team participated in the 2010 and 2014 World Cup qualifiers and 2015 Asian Cup qualifiers, but were unsuccessful, being eliminated at the first hurdle. The team lost 6–0 on aggregate against the United Arab Emirates in the first round of 2010 FIFA World Cup qualification. In the 2014 World Cup qualifiers, Vietnam could only defeat Macau in the first round before being eliminated by Qatar in the second, while in the 2015 Asian Cup qualifiers, they lost five out of six matches and finished bottom of their group, which included the United Arab Emirates, Uzbekistan and Hong Kong. The 1–0 defeat to Hong Kong at Mong Kok Stadium on 22 March 2013 was considered Vietnamese football's lowest-ever point set in the 21st century.

Vietnam also failed to defend their continental title due to elimination by Malaysia in the 2010 AFF Championship semi-final. The 2012 AFF Championship also saw the team's worst performance in 8 years, as they were eliminated in the group stage with their only point coming from a 1–1 draw with Myanmar, while losing 3–1 to Thailand and 1–0 to the Philippines.

=== Miura and Hữu Thắng (2014–2017) ===
The Vietnamese national team witnessed significant changes under the tenure of Japanese head coach Toshiya Miura, who took charge of Vietnam from 2014 to 2016. The Japanese coach was credited for rebuilding the national team after the failed 2015 AFC Asian Cup qualification and had a significant impact on the improvement of the team's performances. One of the most renowned achievements of Miura's regime was with the youth team, which beat Iran at the 2014 Asian Games with an unexpected 4–1 score. Many of the young players nurtured by coach Miura were brought to the senior side, which performed well in the 2014 AFF Championship. However, Vietnam failed to progress beyond the semi-finals after a shocking 4–2 home defeat to Malaysia, in spite of winning 2–1 away in the first leg. Vietnamese police had sought to investigate this match, but found no evidence of bribery or corruption, as stated in the findings of Swiss-based international supplier betting services Sportradar.

Miura led Vietnam in the 2018 FIFA World Cup qualifiers in a group with Thailand, Indonesia, Chinese Taipei and Iraq. Indonesia was later banned from participating by FIFA, relieving Vietnam of some pressure. The Golden Star Warriors began their campaign with a 1–1 draw with Iraq at home. However, two disappointing defeats to Thailand, away 1–0 and a humiliating 3–0 home loss, subjected the team to heavy criticism. Despite the sporadic improvement, Toshiya Miura was sacked by the VFF after the Olympic side's failure to qualify for the 2016 Rio Olympics.

Under Nguyễn Hữu Thắng, Vietnam once again progressed to the semi-finals of the 2016 AFF Championship, but lost to Indonesia in another thrilling semi-final, being held 2–2 at home, having lost 2–1 away. The team's disappointment was relieved a little, as the Golden Star Warriors finished third in the 2019 AFC Asian Cup qualification World Cup qualification group. The Vietnamese side managed two draws in their opening run against Afghanistan in Tajikistan and a goalless draw to Jordan in Ho Chi Minh City. However, the Olympic side was surprisingly eliminated in the group stage of the 2017 SEA Games, and Nguyễn Hữu Thắng was relieved from duty. The team faced a crisis of confidence as many fans stopped supporting the team. Interim coach Mai Đức Chung was appointed to help Vietnam in two crucial Asian Cup qualification matches against neighbouring Cambodia, in which he was able to replenish some of the team's lost spirit, beating Cambodia 2–1 away and giving them a 5–0 thrashing at home. These wins placed Vietnam in the top two for final qualification.

=== Park Hang-seo era (2017–2023) ===
Park Hang-seo, former assistant to Guus Hiddink for South Korea at the 2002 FIFA World Cup, was appointed as the new coach of the Vietnam national team on 29 September 2017. His appointment came after an attempt to negotiate with Takashi Sekizuka was unsuccessful. Previously, the VFF had tried to contact Steve Sampson, but received no response.

Park's first match as coach of Vietnam was in the 2019 AFC Asian Cup qualifications, where Vietnam defeated Cambodia at home 5–0 on 10 October 2017, followed by a 0–0 draw at home against Afghanistan on 14 November 2017. This allowed Vietnam to qualify for the 2019 AFC Asian Cup, their first Asian Cup since 2007. Park himself, though, was criticized due to the team's unconvincing performance. However, the mood rapidly changed after Vietnam youth team's impressive showings in the 2018 AFC U-23 Championship and 2018 Asian Games where Park Hang-seo was also the coach of the U-23 and Olympic team. With the same U-23 players, he formed the squad of the Vietnamese senior team in a dead-rubber 1–1 draw to Jordan in 2019 Asian Cup qualification, which both teams qualified together.

Vietnam's starting lineup in the second leg of the 2018 AFF Championship final.

==== 2018 AFF Championship ====
Park's first major tournament was the 2018 AFF Championship. Vietnam topped their group with wins against Laos (3–0), Malaysia (2–0) and Cambodia (3–0), as well as a 0–0 draw with Myanmar. In the semi-finals, they defeated the Philippines and advanced to face Malaysia again. The first leg at Bukit Jalil saw Vietnam lead by two goals, but Malaysia tie the score through Shahrul Saad and a free kick by Safawi Rasid. Still, an early goal from Nguyễn Anh Đức in the second leg was enough to win them the AFF Championship after 10 years with an unbeaten record. Nguyễn Quang Hải scored four goals and was voted the tournament's best player.

==== 2019 AFC Asian Cup ====
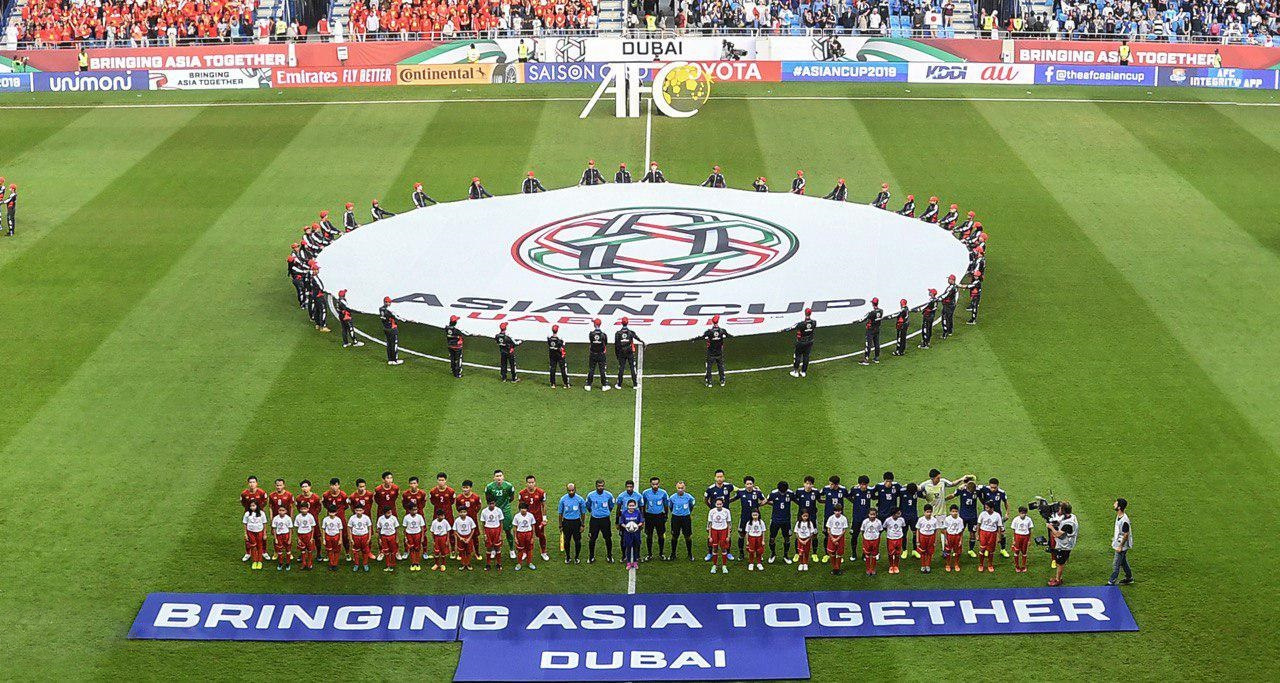
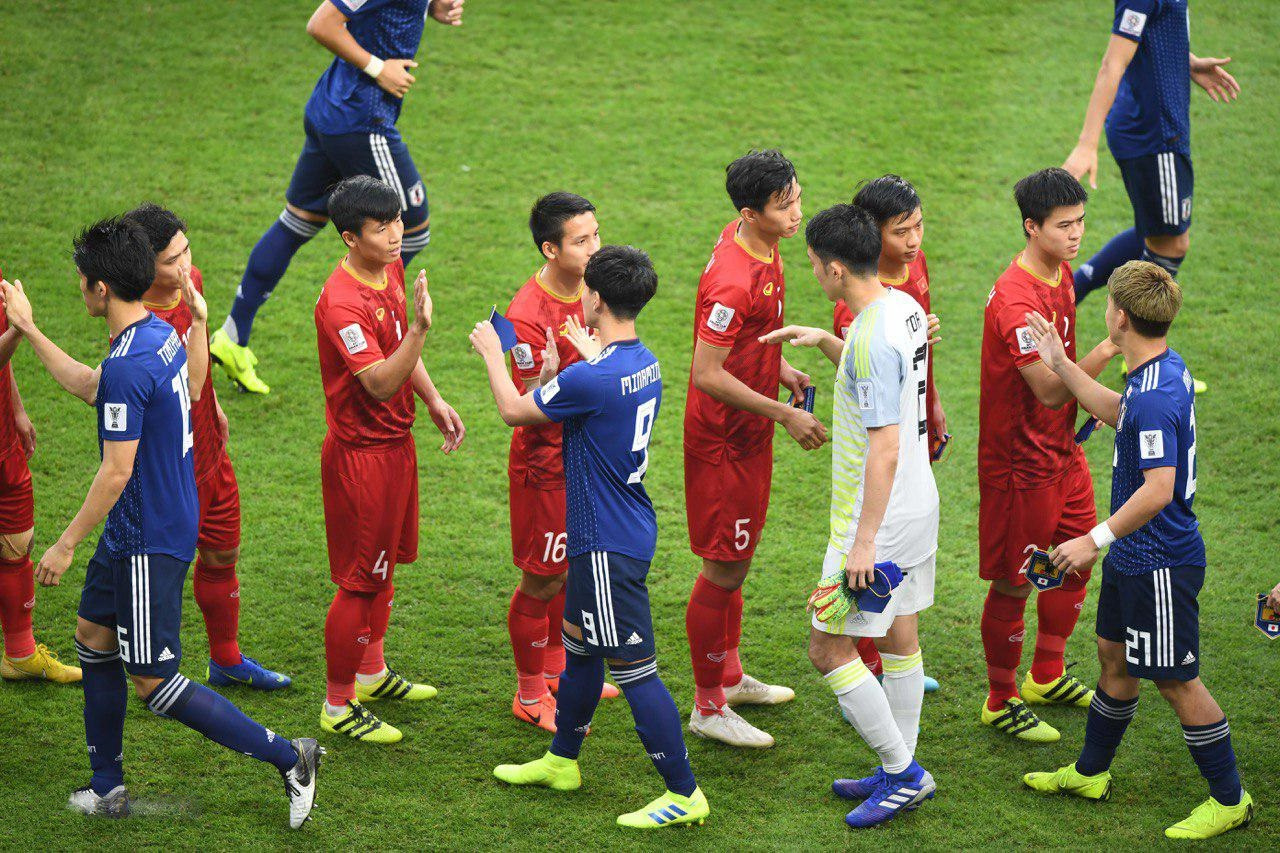
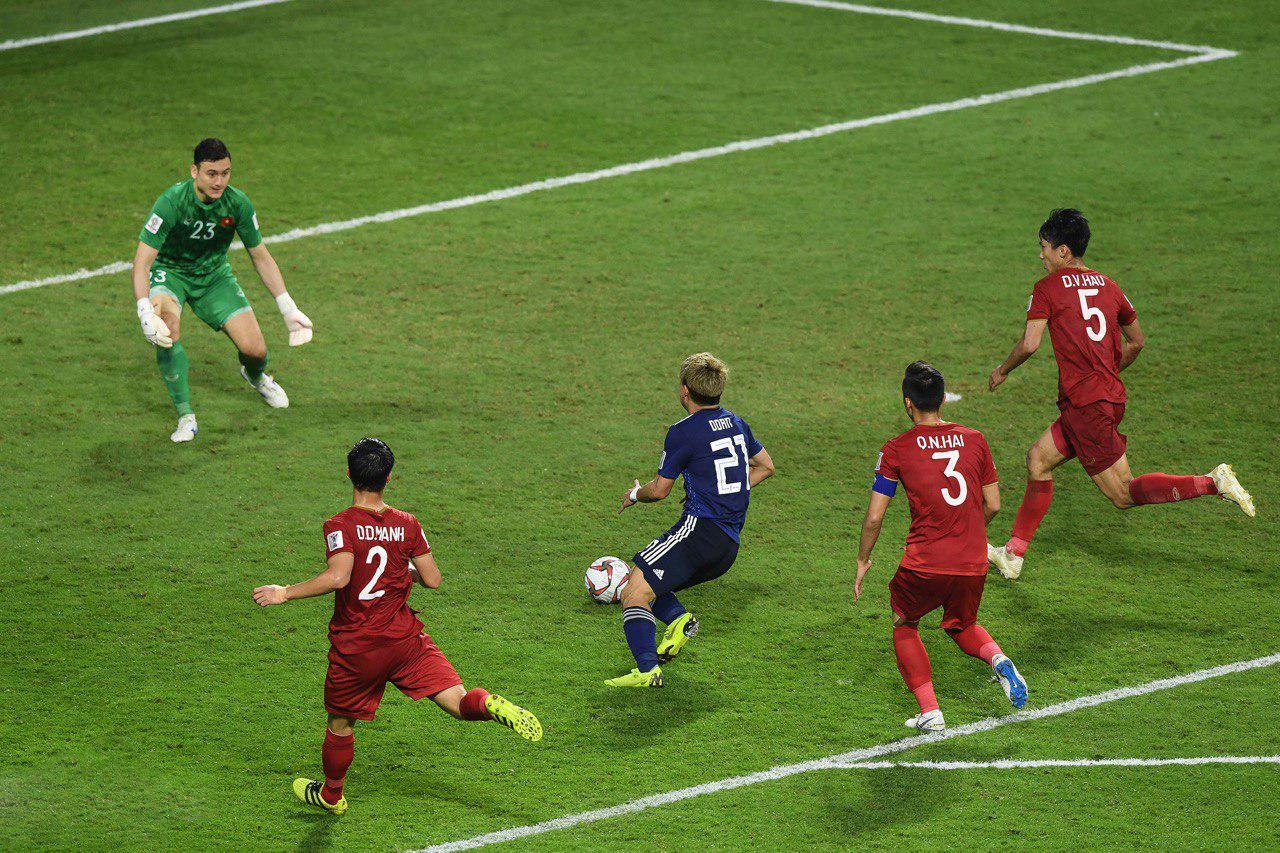
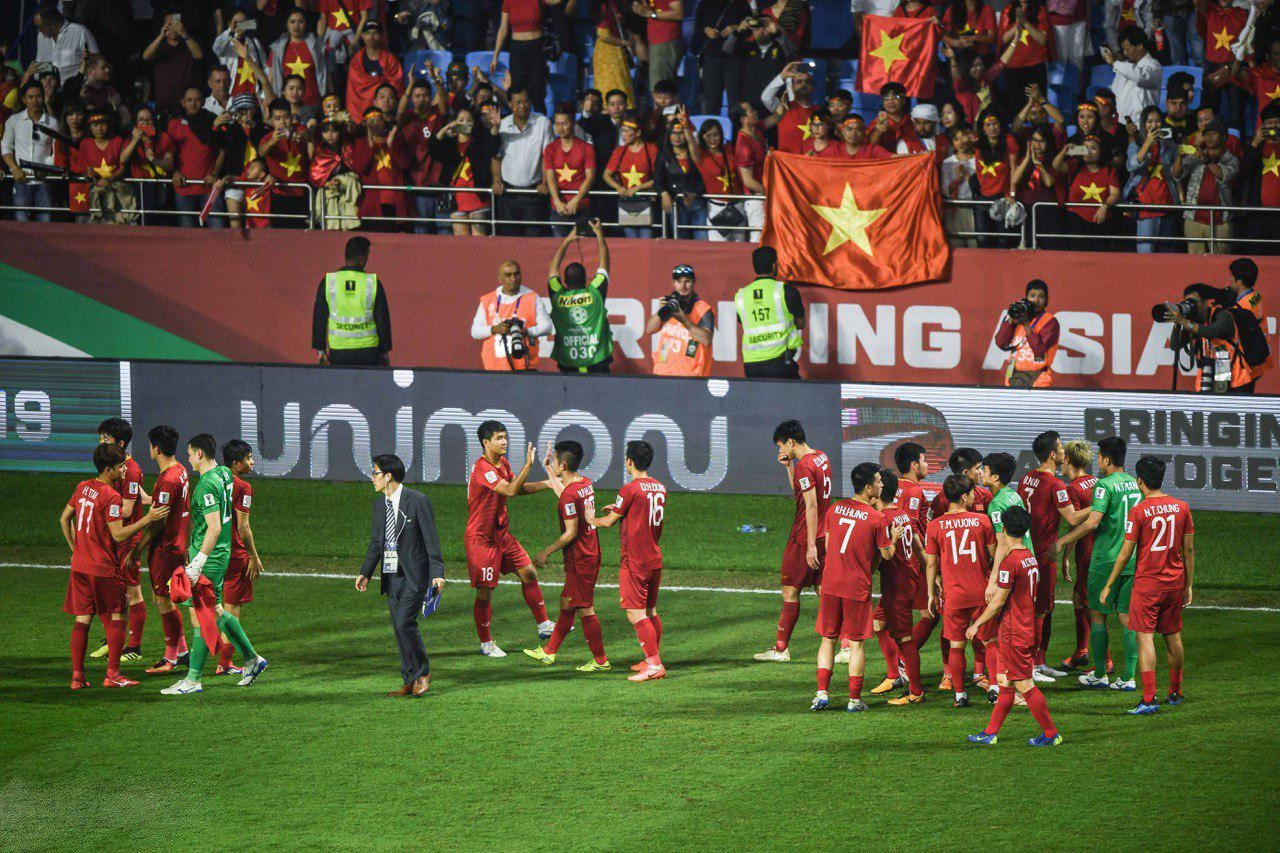
Scenes during the quarter-finals of the 2019 AFC Asian Cup. Clockwise from top: Vietnamese team with Japan at the cup quarter-finals and Vietnamese fans during the match.

It wasn't until the 2019 AFC Asian Cup that Vietnam truly began to gain international recognition. With the entire squad made up of mostly promising U-23 players, Vietnam had the youngest squad in the tournament. Being drawn into group D along with Iran, Iraq, and Yemen, Vietnam lost to Iraq 2–3 conceding a 90th-minute free kick from Ali Adnan and Iran 0–2 before beating Yemen 2–0 in their final group matches with goals coming from Nguyễn Quang Hải and Quế Ngọc Hải to seal Vietnam to become the last best third-place team qualifying for the round of 16. Then, they pulled up a shocking result by defeating Jordan in a penalty shootout, with Bùi Tiến Dũng scoring the decisive penalties which sent them to the quarter-finals. The win sent millions of Vietnamese into the streets for celebrations. In the quarter-finals, Vietnam played against Japan but failed to continue the success after their opponent was awarded a penalty kick which was decided through the video assistant referee (VAR), resulting in a 0–1 lost score by Ritsu Dōan until the final whistle was blown.

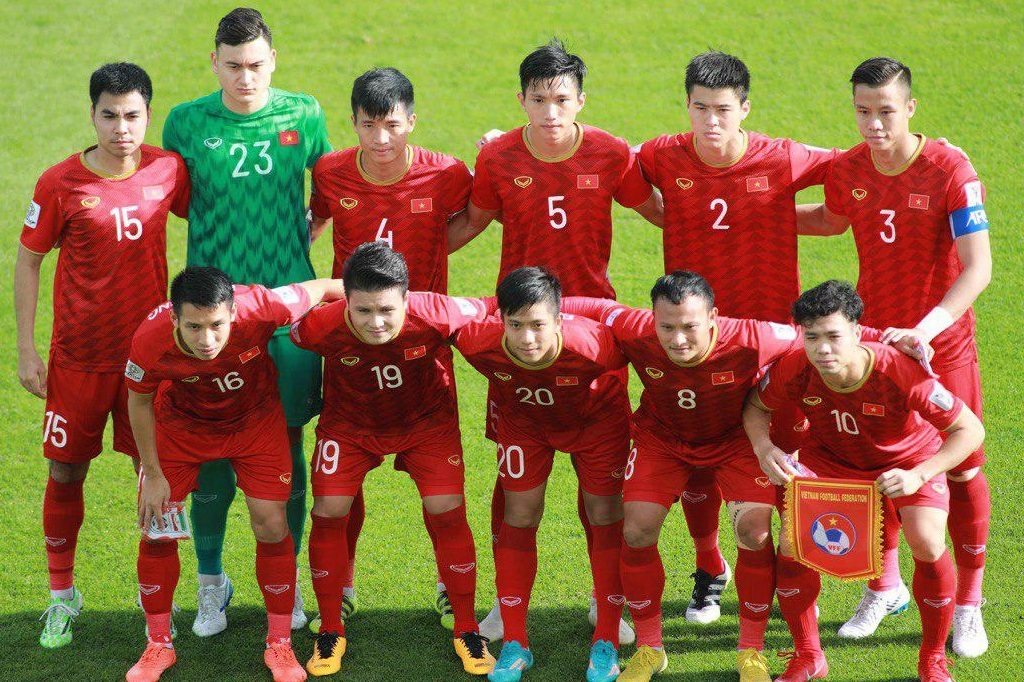
The Vietnamese national team's squad before facing Iran at the 2019 AFC Asian Cup.

==== 2022 FIFA World Cup qualification ====
Vietnam was grouped in the 2022 FIFA World Cup qualifying Second Round Group G with three other Southeast Asian rivals: Thailand, Malaysia and Indonesia, along with the United Arab Emirates. The Vietnamese started with a 0–0 away draw over Thailand before defeating Malaysia 1–0 at home and then achieved a 3–1 away win against Indonesia. In November 2019, Vietnam faced the United Arab Emirates on home soil with attempts to break a 12-year winless streak to the opponent. In spite of facing a struggle in the early minutes, a red card to the UAE gave the Vietnamese an advantage. They eventually managed to beat the Emirates 1–0. Then, Vietnam moved to a thrilling encounter against neighbour and fellow powerhouse Thailand at home, where both teams played in another goalless draw, in a match with a crucial Akinfeev-penalty like save by Đặng Văn Lâm and two disallowed Vietnamese goals, to foster Vietnam's top position in the Joint World Cup/Asian Cup qualifying Group G.

However, due to the COVID-19 pandemic, Vietnam was forced to play all their remaining qualifying second-round games in the United Arab Emirates. In this campaign, Vietnam suffered a great loss of key players, as the midfield soul Đỗ Hùng Dũng suffered from a severe injury in 2021 V.League 1 that caused him 6-months of recession, while best goalie Đặng Văn Lâm, due to an unexpected incident related to COVID-19 in his Japanese club Cerezo Osaka, could not come to the national team in Dubai, the key midfielder Nguyễn Tuấn Anh, after suffering an aggressive tackle from an Indonesian player in the 20th minute of the first match, had to miss the rest of the qualifying second round. Nevertheless, even with such a great loss, Vietnam's campaign in UAE was an astonishing success. Vietnam pounded Indonesia 4–0 and held on to a 2–1 win against Malaysia. On the last match day, Vietnam battled it out in a thrilling encounter against the hosts, UAE. After trailing 3–0, a late surge in the final 10 minutes brought 2 goals on the scoresheet for Vietnam, but it wasn't enough as the match ended 3–2 in favour of UAE. Despite losing however, with Australia defeating Jordan 1–0 in the decisive game of Group B and later Saudi Arabia beating Uzbekistan 3–0 in the decisive game of Group D, Vietnam officially claimed its ticket into the third and final round of the 2022 FIFA World Cup qualifiers for the first time ever, and automatic qualification to the 2023 AFC Asian Cup in China, after entering as one of the five best runner-ups, the second Southeast Asian nation after Thailand to achieve the feat.

Vietnam vs Japan, 2019 AFC Asian Cup quarter-finals

In the third round, Vietnam was drawn into group B along with Japan, Australia, Saudi Arabia, China, and Oman where Vietnam lost its first seven head-to-head matches. The team played its best in every match, but since the team suffered an injury crisis, which began in mid-August 2021, Vietnam was unable to achieve a single point after the first seven games, and was officially eliminated from the FIFA World Cup qualification after a 0–4 loss against Australia in Melbourne Rectangular Stadium on 27 January 2022. However, just five days later, it became the first ever team from Southeast Asia to win a match in the final round of the World Cup qualifiers by beating China 3–1 at home on 1 February 2022, which coincided with the Lunar New Year's Day in Vietnam and China. The win was also the first-ever win from a Southeast Asian team ever and also the first-ever win against China in an official competitive match in 65 years, when Indonesia beat China 2–0 in the 1958 FIFA World Cup qualification. The team achieved another historical result in the last qualifying match with a 1–1 draw against host Japan in Saitama Stadium 2002 on 29 March marking the first time ever that Vietnam did not lose against Japan since its reintegration into international football. Nonetheless, Vietnam only earned 4 points in total after 10 matches of the third round (1 win, 1 draw, 8 losses) and finished bottom, losing against all teams in this round but ended up with a historic 3–1 win over China and a draw against Japan in the final match, which was still Vietnam's best ever run in the FIFA World Cup qualification, massively influencing Vietnam's image as a potential, emerging footballing nation.

==== 2022 AFF Championship ====
In October 2022, Park Hang-seo announced that he would leave his position as coach at the conclusion of the 2022 AFF Championship. In the tournament, Vietnam topped their group with victories against Laos, Malaysia, and Myanmar and a draw against Singapore. Vietnam defeated Indonesia in the semi-finals but lost 3–2 on aggregate to Thailand in the final. Coach Park Hang-seo, is considered the most successful coach in Vietnam football history, with FIFA praising Vietnam's progress throughout his managerial career with the team. His achievements include the junior team success in the 2018 AFC U-23 Championship as Asian runners-up, the 2018 Asian Games in 4th place, consecutive Southeast Asian Games gold medal finishes in 2019 and 2021, as well as the senior team in the 2018 AFF Championship as champions, the 2019 AFC Asian Cup as top 8, and Vietnam's first time ever qualification to the final (third) round of the 2022 FIFA World Cup qualification for Asia.

=== Decline under Philippe Troussier (2023–2024) ===
On 16 February 2023, VFF announced that Frenchman Philippe Troussier, who led South Africa and Japan to the 1998 and 2002 FIFA World Cups, had been appointed coach of the Vietnam national team and the under-23s. Troussier was officially presented on 27 February 2023, making him the first FIFA World Cup profile manager to lead the country. Troussier signed a contract that last until 31 July 2026, with an ambitious goal of taking Vietnam to the next FIFA World Cup in 2026, where the biggest men's international football tournament increased the number of participating teams from 32 to 48. Vietnam has never been to the World Cup and the furthest stages were only up to the AFC qualification third round previously under Park Hang-seo.

Before his debut with the national team, Philipe Troussier had led Vietnam's Olympic side in the 2023 SEA Games in Phnom Penh, Cambodia, where Vietnam finished with a bronze medal.

Vietnam started its 2026 FIFA World Cup qualification from the second round of the AFC, drawn in a group with Iraq, Philippines, and Indonesia. Troussier declared during a press conference that he wishes to call up more overseas Vietnamese players into the national teams to strengthen the team for the qualifiers. Later, Czech based Andrej Nguyen and Filip Nguyen were two of the first overseas players to get called up under Troussier. In June 2023, Troussier made his debut with the Vietnamese national team with two friendly match wins against Hong Kong and Syria. After a series of six friendlies from 15 June to 17 October 2023 to prepare for the FIFA World Cup qualifiers, Vietnam ended up with three wins and three losses, including a heavy 0–6 defeat against South Korea which was one of the biggest defeats in Vietnam's football history, as well as losses against China and Uzbekistan.

On 16 November 2023, Vietnam began its 2026 FIFA World Cup qualification campaign with a 2–0 away game win against the Philippines. A few days later, Vietnam suffered a 0–1 defeat against Iraq on home soil, conceding a goal in the last minute of the game. The first two qualifiers games saw Troussier renewing the team's starting lineup with several young players such as Phan Tuấn Tài, Võ Minh Trọng or Nguyễn Thái Sơn.

Vietnam qualified for the 2023 AFC Asian Cup and were grouped with Japan, Iraq, and Indonesia in Group D. At the dawn of the tournament, the team left with many doubts due to the absence of key players like Đặng Văn Lâm, Đoàn Văn Hậu, Quế Ngọc Hải or Nguyễn Tiến Linh due to injuries. The Golden Star Warriors were then forced to deal with a talented but inexperienced squad with an average age of 25. New hard blows were then added with the forfeit of Nguyễn Hoàng Đức, 2021 Vietnamese Golden Ball, who also failed to recover from his injury.

Vietnam came to the tournament with a team mostly constituted of players with little experience in international competitions. The team had a positive performance in the opening match, losing 2–4 to title contender Japan and leading 2–1 at one point during the game. However, Vietnam then lost 0–1 to direct competitor Indonesia and was soon eliminated from the group stage, marking their first defeat to Indonesia after 7 years. In the final group stage game against Iraq, Vietnam had a good start while leading 1–0 after the first half, but the team soon fell into a disadvantage position after Khuất Văn Khang was sent off. Iraq quickly led 2–1 before Nguyễn Quang Hải equalized in the 89th minute. In the last minute of the game, Iraq was awarded a penalty and converted it, ending the match as 2–3 lost for Vietnam, forcing them to leave the tournament with 0 points.

Continuing on with 2026 FIFA World Cup qualification, Vietnam suffered further losses to Indonesia on 21 and 26 March with an aggregate score of 0–4, with the return leg, which ended 0–3, being the first defeat to the Garuda at home in 20 years, also with the same scoreline. Following these performances, the VFF terminated Troussier's contract immediately through mutual consent. Under Troussier, Vietnam only won 4 out of 14 matches and suffered 7 defeats in a row.

=== Rebuild under Kim Sang-sik (2024–present) ===
Having already failed to qualify for the 2026 FIFA World Cup and only setting sights on the 2027 AFC Asian Cup, Kim Sang-sik was announced as Troussier's replacement on 3 May 2024. A month later, on 6 June, Kim made his debut as the head coach of Vietnam in the fifth match of Group F of the second round of the World Cup qualifiers, facing Southeast Asian fellow the Philippines and lead Vietnam to a 3–2 victory and thus ended their losing streak. Due to Indonesia's 2–0 victory over the Philippines, they finished third in the group, missing out on the third round of the FIFA World Cup qualifiers with a direct berth to the 2027 AFC Asian Cup, and entered the AFC Asian Cup final qualifiers instead. They later lost the final game to group leader Iraq.

In the 2024 ASEAN Championship, Vietnam was drawn in Group B with Indonesia, the Philippines, Myanmar and Laos. The Vietnam national football team had an outstanding performance in the 2024 ASEAN Championship, showcasing their talent and dedication throughout the competition. They began their campaign in the group stage with a 4–1 victory over Laos. The team later grabbed a late 1–0 win over Indonesia, a 1–1 draw against Philippines, and finished the phase with a dominant 5–0 win over Myanmar. The victory against Myanmar saw Rafaelson making his debut and scoring two goals, becoming the first Vietnamese-naturalized player to score for the national team in an official match. The team concluded the group stage with a great record of three victories and one tie, allowing them to lead Group B with 10 points. This performance also gave them a two-place jump in FIFA ranking from 116th to 114th.

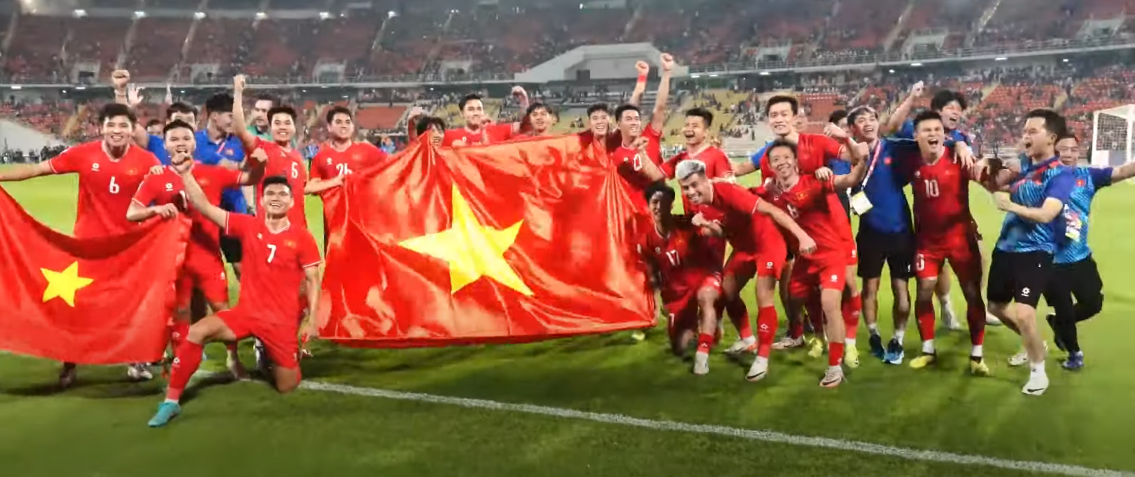
Vietnam players and staff celebrating after winning the 2024 ASEAN Championship.

In the semi-finals, Vietnam met Singapore in a two-game tie. The first leg concluded in a 2–0 victory for Vietnam, with goals from Nguyễn Tiến Linh and Rafaelson. The second leg ended with a score of 3–1 for Vietnam, thereby Vietnam won the right to play in the final with a total score of 5–1 after two matches against Singapore. In the finals, Vietnam met Thailand in a two-game tie. The first leg concluded in a 2–1 victory for Vietnam, with two goals from Rafaelson. The second leg ended with a dramatic 3–2 victory for Vietnam, defeating Thailand with a total score of 5–3 after two matches, and Vietnam won the ASEAN Championship for the third time after more than six years of waiting.

Vietnam's starting lineup in the second leg of the 2024 ASEAN Championship final.

In the final round of 2027 AFC Asian Cup qualification, Vietnam was drawn into Group F with two Southeast Asian teams: Malaysia and Laos, along with Nepal. They began their journey with a 5–0 victory over Laos. However, Vietnam lost the next match to Malaysia, their first in 11 years, with a 4–0 scoreline, although Vietnam's heavy loss was later mitigated by the Malaysian football naturalisation scandal unfolding as Malaysia's win could potentially be overturned into an automatic loss. After an investigation, the CAS declared Malaysia had falsified naturalisation documents and AFC declared Vietnam earned a 3–0 win in that game. Amidst Malaysia's ongoing scandal, Vietnam rebounded with great difficulties by beating Nepal 3–1 and 1–0 respectively, with poor performances and much criticism over the team's disjointed display. Vietnam concluded 2025 with an unconvincing 2–0 win against Laos, with Rafaelson returning to the national team after eleven months of absence due to a heavy injury he suffered against Thailand in the second leg of the 2024 ASEAN Championship final and scoring the opening goal with a penalty, and the second goal scored by Phạm Tuấn Hải. Following the win, Vietnam's FIFA Ranking position jumped from 110 to 107, though it would decrease to 108 as of January 2026. On 31 March 2026, Vietnam achieved a 3–1 win against Malaysia at home, completing a perfect campaign in the 2027 AFC Asian Cup qualifiers, with six out of six wins achieved. As a result of this win, combined with the 0–4 defeat to Malaysia being overturned to a 3–0 win, and an additional 3–0 win against Bangladesh in a friendly a few days earlier, on 1 April, Vietnam jumped to rank 99, increasing nine ranks. This marked the first time Vietnam was above the 100th rank since December 2023.

Vietnam's starting lineup in the second leg of the 2026 ASEAN Championship final.

In the 2026 ASEAN Championship, Vietnam was drawn in Group A with Singapore, Indonesia, Cambodia and Timor-Leste. Vietnam started the campaign with a 7–0 demolition against Timor-Leste, but this was soon followed with a disappointing 0–0 draw against Singapore at Mỹ Đình National Stadium. Under risk of early elimination, Vietnam overcame the pressure with a dominant 3–0 away win over Indonesia, followed by a 3–1 victory against Cambodia to top Group A and advance to the semi-finals. Facing a weakened Malaysia following the consequences of the naturalisation scandal, Vietnam achieved comfortable 2–0 win in both legs, winning 4–0 on aggregate and advancing to the final to meet Thailand. Vietnam produced a 2–0 victory in the first leg at Rajamangala Stadium, before drawing 2–2 at home to win consecutive titles for the first time in their history, and clinching their fourth ASEAN Championship title overall.

==== 2026 FIFA ASEAN Cup ====
In September 2026, Vietnam played in the inaugural FIFA ASEAN Cup of the 2026 edition. Vietnam were drawn alongside Thailand, Philippines and Pakistan in Group B. In their opening match, Vietnam recorded their first win after Nguyễn Đình Bắc scored in the 25th minute to secure a 1–0 victory over Philippines. A 0–2 loss to Thailand on 29 September meant that Vietnam could not win the competition, and their 27-game unbeaten streak across all competitions had been broken. Vietnam managed to finish second of Group B after defeating Pakistan 4–2 and advanced to the third-place match against Malaysia where they lost 0–1 to finish fourth.

== Team image ==
=== Kit sponsorship ===
Vietnam's current kit sponsor is Jogarbola. The contract started in January 2024.

Vietnam was also previously sponsored by Umbro, Diadora, Adidas, Li-Ning, Nike, and Grand Sport. Vietnam's first kit used on the international stage in 1991 was manufactured in-house. It featured neither the national flag nor the federation logo; instead, the logo of national team sponsor Colusa-Miliket was displayed across the center of the shirt.

The traditional home colour for the Vietnamese team is all red with yellow and white trim and the away colour is all white with red and golden trim ever since they started the contract with Nike. With Adidas, it was just red and white. Historically, the team wore yellow jerseys or white jerseys with blue trims as away colours. The combination of yellow jerseys with red trims, are popularly recognized as unpropitious due to its negative connotation to South Vietnamese symbolism, hence it is largely avoided in Vietnam's history of modern jerseys, especially during Adidas era when it had to modify its three-stripe templates.

In August 2026, there have been rumors and speculations about Adidas' historic return as the national team's kit sponsor after 2 decades, following the German company's to invest their sportwear's in the region.

Kit suppliers	Period	Notes
In-house	1991–1993	
(United Kingdom) Umbro	1993	Away kit only
(Italy) Diadora	1993–1995	
(Germany) Adidas	1996–2005	
In-house	2005	
(China) Li-Ning	2006–2008	
(United States) Nike	2009–2014	
(Thailand) Grand Sport	2014–2023	
(Japan) Jogarbola	2024–2026	Represented by local firm Động Lực JSC
(Germany) Adidas	From 2027	

=== Sponsorship ===
The team has sponsors including: Acecook Vietnam, Yanmar, Honda, Sony, Sabeco Brewery, Coca-Cola, Vinamilk, Kao, Herbalife Nutrition, Trung Nguyên, Red Bull, VNPay, FPT Play, and VTVcab.

=== Logo ===
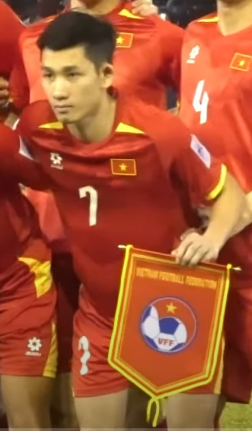
Hai Long in a 2025 match, wearing the national team's standard jersey with the Vietnamese flag and holding the pennant with the federation's logo.

Unlike many national teams in the world, Vietnam is one of the few football teams to not feature their federation (VFF) logo, or logo that is styled from a national emblem/coat of arms such as Russia, Australia or Poland at their jersey, but rather the national flag. The few other FIFA members to feature the national flag include Palestine, North Korea, Switzerland, and Turkey, and was one of the only teams to not feature the logo in Southeast Asia, alongside its Philippine fellows in 2026. The logo of VFF is used on the team's gear (hats, bags, masks, coats, captain's armband in friendly matches,...) and in products of multimedia for the team. However, in the 1998 AFF Championship, team Vietnam used the then-VFF logo on their jersey officially.

Despite VFF unveiling a logo of a dragon for the national football team in 2017, it was not incorporated onto the national jersey due to negative reception from media and supporters. Furthermore, the dragon logo was intended only for the men's national team at first, which would be unreasonable if it was also incorporated into the national jerseys and the uniforms of other teams (women's teams, youth teams, futsal teams, beach soccer teams). Afterwards, it was never utilized.

=== Nicknames ===
The VFF's media outlets officially use the nickname Những chiến binh sao vàng (English: Golden Star Warriors) for the national team, which is derived from the star of the national flag on the team's jersey. The local media in Vietnam also refer to the national team as simply "Tuyển" (The selection).

=== Supporters ===
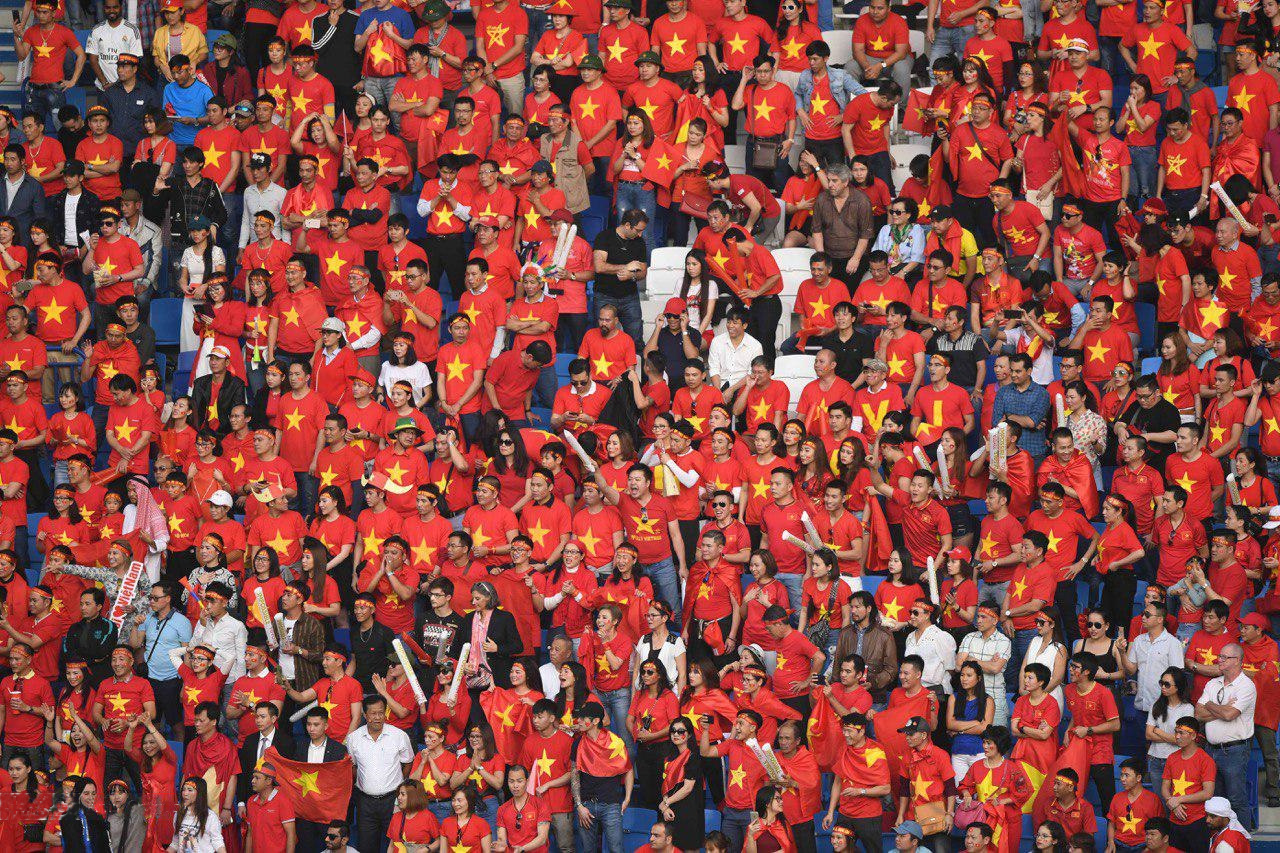
Vietnamese supporters during the 2019 AFC Asian Cup, in all red and yellow star attire similar to the colour of the flag of Vietnam.

Vietnamese supporters are dubbed to be passionate, having had large celebrations over the team's achievements at senior and youth levels.

There are two major supporters' clubs for the national team, namely Vietnam Football Supporters (VFS, Vietnamese: Hội Cổ động viên Bóng đá Việt Nam) which was founded in 2014 and Vietnam Golden Stars (VGS, Vietnamese: Hội Cổ động viên Sao vàng Việt Nam) which was founded in 2017.

When the national team wins important matches, the streets are often overwhelmed by large Vietnamese crowds in an activity known as street storming, which features nationalist chants and the singing of nationalist songs. Vietnamese passionate supporters have been witnessed during the 2007 AFC Asian Cup when the team defeated the UAE 2–0 and later became the lone Southeast Asian side to sneak into the quarter-finals. During the 2019 AFC Asian Cup, Vietnamese fans were euphoric in celebration after beating Jordan in the round of 16.

Even in smaller tournaments, Vietnamese fans are also noted for large celebrations, such as when Vietnam won the 2008, 2018, 2024 and 2026 AFF Championships; and the 2018 AFC U-23 Championship in which their team finished runners-up after losing the final against Uzbekistan.

=== Home stadium ===
The Vietnamese national team mainly plays at Mỹ Đình National Stadium in Hanoi. In the 21st century, Vietnam has played its official home matches in 8 different stadiums with Thống Nhất Stadium, Hàng Đẫy Stadium, Thiên Trường Stadium, Gò Đậu Stadium, Lạch Tray Stadium, Việt Trì Stadium and Thái Nguyên Stadium as secondary stadiums used.

Vietnam national football team home stadiums
Image	Stadium	Capacity	Location	Last match	Map of the host cities
	Mỹ Đình National Stadium	40,192	Hanoi	v Thailand (26 August 2026; 2026 ASEAN Championship)	Vietnam national football team is located in Vietnam
	Lạch Tray Stadium	30,000	Haiphong	v Hong Kong (15 June 2023; Friendly)	Vietnam national football team is located in Vietnam
	Thiên Trường Stadium	30,000	Ninh Bình	v Kyrgyzstan (17 November 2026; 2026 Casper Cup)	Vietnam national football team is located in Vietnam
	Hàng Đẫy Stadium	22,500	Hanoi	v Bangladesh (26 March 2026; Friendly)	Vietnam national football team is located in Vietnam
	Thái Nguyên Stadium	22,000	Thái Nguyên	v Myanmar (18 July 2026; Friendly)	Vietnam national football team is located in Vietnam
	Việt Trì Stadium	20,000	Phú Thọ	v Thailand (2 January 2025; 2024 ASEAN Championship)	Vietnam national football team is located in Vietnam
	Gò Đậu Stadium	18,250	Ho Chi Minh City	v Nepal (9 October 2025; 2027 AFC Asian Cup qualification)	Vietnam national football team is located in Vietnam
	Thống Nhất Stadium	14,400	Ho Chi Minh City	v Nepal (14 October 2025; 2027 AFC Asian Cup qualification)	Vietnam national football team is located in Vietnam

=== Rivalries ===
Vietnam has rivalries with some Southeast Asian teams: Thailand, Indonesia and Malaysia. These rivalries are rooted in geographical proximity.

As of 5 October 2026

Opponent	Pld	W	D	L	GF	GA	GD	Win %	Details
Thailand	62	26	13	23	90	84	+6	41.94	Matches
Indonesia	51	17	13	21	67	75	−8	33.33	Matches
Malaysia	65	35	10	20	100	94	+6	53.85	
Singapore	42	23	14	5	76	42	+34	54.76	

==== Thailand ====
Thailand is often considered Vietnam's biggest rival in football within the Southeast Asian region. The matches between these two teams are usually likened to the "El Clásico" of Southeast Asian football and are followed with much interest in both countries. Vietnam as South Vietnam first faced Thailand in 1956, then the two teams also faced each other at the 1959 Southeast Asian Games and Vietnam won the two matches, in the group stage and the final (Thailand was the host). Despite currently having the better overall record compared with Thailand with 26 wins, 13 draws, and 22 losses after 61 matches, Vietnam has generally poor results against Thailand since its reintegration into international football in 1991. After the match between the two teams in the matchday two of 2026 FIFA ASEAN Cup, Vietnam has faced Thailand in 34 matches at the national team level since 1991, winning only 6, drawing 10, and losing 18. Despite this, Vietnam, since reintegration into the world's football, is renowned for its performance of punching above the weight, often due to its ability to culminate surprise results despite disadvantages, while Thailand has struggled harder to do the same.

Vietnam's most memorable win against Thailand was in the final of the 2008 AFF Championship, a 2–1 first-leg win in Bangkok gave Vietnam the advantage, before a 1–1 draw in Hanoi – sealed by a last-minute header from Lê Công Vinh, secured the country's first-ever AFF Championship title.

==== Indonesia ====
The rivalry stems from the strong competition between Vietnam and Indonesia, as well as the equal strength of the two teams during their matchups. Vietnam and Indonesia have faced each other in 49 matches, with Vietnam having the poorer record with 16 wins, 12 draws, and 21 losses. During the 20-year period from 1999 to 2019, Vietnam only drew and lost against Indonesia in official tournaments beginning after the 1–0 win over Indonesia in 1999 in the semi-finals of the 1999 SEA Games, lasting 12 matches, with seven draws and five losses. Finally, it ended on 15 October 2019 when Vietnam won 3–1 against Indonesia in their third match of the 2022 FIFA World Cup qualification's second round in Bali. In the 2023 AFC Asian Cup, the two teams confronted in the group stage in a game that ended in a 1–0 victory for Indonesia, which qualify them to the round of 16 while Vietnam got eliminated. In the 2026 World Cup qualification Vietnam have suffered 2 conclusive defeated with Indonesia 0–1 away and 0–3 home, which later knocked Vietnam out of the 2026 FIFA World Cup. The most recent meeting between the two sides occurred on 3 August 2026 in the 2026 ASEAN Championship, when Vietnam defeated Indonesia 3–0 away at the group stage.

==== Malaysia ====
Similar to Indonesia, Malaysia was considered an equal regional football powerhouse on par with Vietnam. As South Vietnam, the Vietnamese side had a poorer performance, with only three wins, three draws and seven losses, during that time the Malaysians posed as a formidable side in Asia. Since the country's reunification, the rivalry continued when the two teams regularly faced off at regional tournaments like the AFF Championship or SEA Games. The matches between the two teams are marked by the tension between the players on the field and between the fans in the stands. Since 1991, Vietnam has overwhelmed in the head-to-head record against Malaysia with 19 wins, 3 draws, and only 6 losses. Vietnam maintained a series of unbeaten matches against Malaysia from 2014 to 2026, which includes an overturned defeat following the Malaysian football naturalisation scandal in 2025. The unbeaten streak came to an end on 5 October 2026 during the 2026 FIFA ASEAN Cup, where they lost 0–1.

==== Singapore ====
While Singapore was still a force in the AFF until 2012, the team was a big rival for Vietnam. They have faced each other in 42 matches, with Vietnam dominating with 23 wins, 14 draws, and 5 losses. However, in the period of just reintegrating with international football in 1991, Vietnam experienced, in the period from 1993 to 1998, a poorer head-to-head record against Singapore; especially when they lost the 1998 AFF Championship final at home. However, since 1998, Vietnam has been maintaining a series of unbeaten matches against Singapore to this day. Vietnam has met Singapore a total of 15 times during this period, winning nine matches and drawing six. Since Singapore's football decline and Vietnam's development in the mid-2010s, the matches between two teams also began to lose its importance.

== Results and fixtures ==
The following is a list of match results in the last 12 months, as well as any future matches that have been scheduled.

Win Draw Loss Fixture

=== 2026 ===
26 March Friendly	Vietnam	3–0	Bangladesh	Hanoi, Vietnam
19:00 UTC+7	Phạm Tuấn Hải 8'; Phạm Xuân Mạnh 18'; Nguyễn Hai Long 38'	Report		Stadium: Hàng Đẫy Stadium; Referee: Cheung Wai Lung Mario (Hong Kong)

31 March 2027 AFC Asian Cup qualification	Vietnam	3–1	Malaysia	Ninh Bình, Vietnam
19:00 UTC+7	Đỗ Duy Mạnh 6'; Rafaelson 51', 59'	Report; Report (AFC)	Endrick 77' (pen.)	Stadium: Thiên Trường Stadium; Attendance: 19,518; Referee: Chae Sang-hyeop (South Korea)

18 July Friendly	Vietnam	4–0	Myanmar	Thái Nguyên, Vietnam
19:00 UTC+7	Nguyễn Xuân Son 5'; Phạm Xuân Mạnh 39'; Đỗ Hoàng Hên 59'; Nguyễn Đình Bắc 90+1' (pen.)	Report		Stadium: Thái Nguyên Stadium; Referee: Torphong Somsing (Thailand)

24 July 2026 ASEAN Championship GS	Timor-Leste	0–7	Vietnam	Chonburi, Thailand
20:30 UTC+7		Report	Đỗ Hoàng Hên 7', 41'; Nguyễn Đình Bắc 31', 42', 65'; Nguyễn Xuân Son 45+1'; Nguyễn Quang Hải 79'	Stadium: Chonburi Stadium; Attendance: 195; Referee: Jin Jingyuan (China)

31 July 2026 ASEAN Championship GS	Vietnam	0–0	Singapore	Hanoi, Vietnam
20:00 UTC+7		Report		Stadium: Mỹ Đình National Stadium; Attendance: 31,569; Referee: Hiroki Kasahara (Japan)

3 August 2026 ASEAN Championship GS	Indonesia	0–3	Vietnam	Bogor, Indonesia
20:30 UTC+7		Report	Nguyễn Văn Vĩ 6'; Nguyễn Hai Long 14'; Nguyễn Xuân Son 71'	Stadium: Pakansari Stadium; Attendance: 27,265; Referee: Tim Danaskos (Australia)

7 August 2026 ASEAN Championship GS	Vietnam	3–1	Cambodia	Hanoi, Vietnam
20:00 UTC+7	Nguyễn Đình Bắc 18', 89'; Vakhim 84' (o.g.)	Report	Bento 71'	Stadium: Mỹ Đình National Stadium; Attendance: 19,628; Referee: Cheung Wai Lung Mario (Hong Kong)

16 August 2026 ASEAN Championship SF 1st leg	Malaysia	0–2	Vietnam	Kuala Lumpur, Malaysia
21:00 UTC+8		Report	Nguyễn Xuân Son 45+5'; Faris Danish 86' (o.g.)	Stadium: Kuala Lumpur Stadium; Attendance: 10,141; Referee: Rustam Lutfullin (Uzbekistan)

19 August 2026 ASEAN Championship SF 2nd leg	Vietnam	2–0	Malaysia	Hanoi, Vietnam
20:00 UTC+7	Nguyễn Xuân Son 62', 89'	Report		Stadium: Mỹ Đình National Stadium; Attendance: 37,906; Referee: Yusuke Ohashi (Japan)

22 August 2026 ASEAN Championship Final 1st leg	Thailand	0–2	Vietnam	Bangkok, Thailand
20:00 UTC+7		Report	Nguyễn Hai Long 62'; Nguyễn Quang Hải 69'	Stadium: Rajamangala Stadium; Attendance: 26,415; Referee: Sami Al-Ismail (Saudi Arabia)

26 August 2026 ASEAN Championship Final 2nd leg	Vietnam	2–2	Thailand	Hanoi, Vietnam
20:00 UTC+7	Chatchai 52' (o.g.); Wanchai 90+3' (o.g.)	Report	Yotsakorn 12'; Wanchai 85'	Stadium: Mỹ Đình National Stadium; Attendance: 38,646; Referee: Ahmed Eisa Darwish (United Arab Emirates)

26 September 2026 FIFA ASEAN Cup GS	Vietnam	1–0	Philippines	Bandung, Indonesia
20:02 UTC+7	Nguyễn Đình Bắc 25'	Report		Stadium: Si Jalak Harupat Stadium; Referee: Thoriq Alkatiri (Indonesia)
Note: The match, originally scheduled for 19:30, was delayed for 32 minutes due to weather conditions.

29 September 2026 FIFA ASEAN Cup GS	Thailand	2–0	Vietnam	Bandung, Indonesia
19:30 UTC+7	Sarach 10'; Chaiyaphon 90+2'	Report		Stadium: Si Jalak Harupat Stadium

2 October 2026 FIFA ASEAN Cup GS	Vietnam	4–2	Pakistan	Jakarta, Indonesia
16:00 UTC+7	Nguyễn Hai Long 50'; Nguyễn Hoàng Đức 57'; Nguyễn Đình Bắc 80'; Williams Minh Hoàng 90+1'	Report	Ullah 31'; Kaleemullah 88'	Stadium: Gelora Bung Karno Stadium

5 October 2026 FIFA ASEAN Cup 3rd place	Malaysia	1–0	Vietnam	Jakarta, Indonesia
16:00 UTC+7	Tierney 62'	Report		Stadium: Gelora Bung Karno Stadium

11 November 2026 Casper Cup	Vietnam	2–0	Chinese Taipei	Ninh Bình, Vietnam
19:00 UTC+7	Olaha Mạnh Đức 21'; Nguyễn Đình Bắc 58'	Report		Stadium: Thiên Trường Stadium; Attendance: 2,148; Referee: Nawal Zubir (Malaysia)

17 November 2026 Casper Cup	Vietnam	1–2	Kyrgyzstan	Ninh Bình, Vietnam
19:00 UTC+7	Nguyễn Đình Bắc 19'	Report	Kichin 86'; Atabayev 88'	Stadium: Thiên Trường Stadium; Attendance: 5,102; Referee: Nawal Zubir (Malaysia)

30 December 2026 Kirin Challenge Cup	Japan	Cancelled	Vietnam	Suita, Japan
--:-- UTC+9				Stadium: Suita City Football Stadium
Note: The match was cancelled following the postponement of the 2027 AFC Asian Cup.

=== 2027 ===
5 January Friendly	Qatar	Cancelled	Vietnam	Qatar
--:-- UTC+7
Note: The match was cancelled following the postponement of the 2027 AFC Asian Cup.

December 2027 AFC Asian Cup GS	United Arab Emirates	v	Vietnam	Riyadh, Saudi Arabia
TBD UTC+3				Stadium: Imam Mohammad Ibn Saud University Stadium

December 2027 AFC Asian Cup GS	Vietnam	v	South Korea	Riyadh, Saudi Arabia
TBD UTC+3				Stadium: Kingdom Arena

2028

January 2027 AFC Asian Cup GS	Vietnam	v	Yemen	Jeddah, Saudi Arabia
TBD UTC+3				Stadium: Prince Abdullah Al Faisal Sports City Stadium

== Coaching staff ==
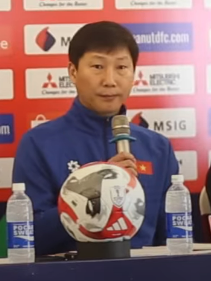
Kim Sang-sik, the current head coach of Vietnam.

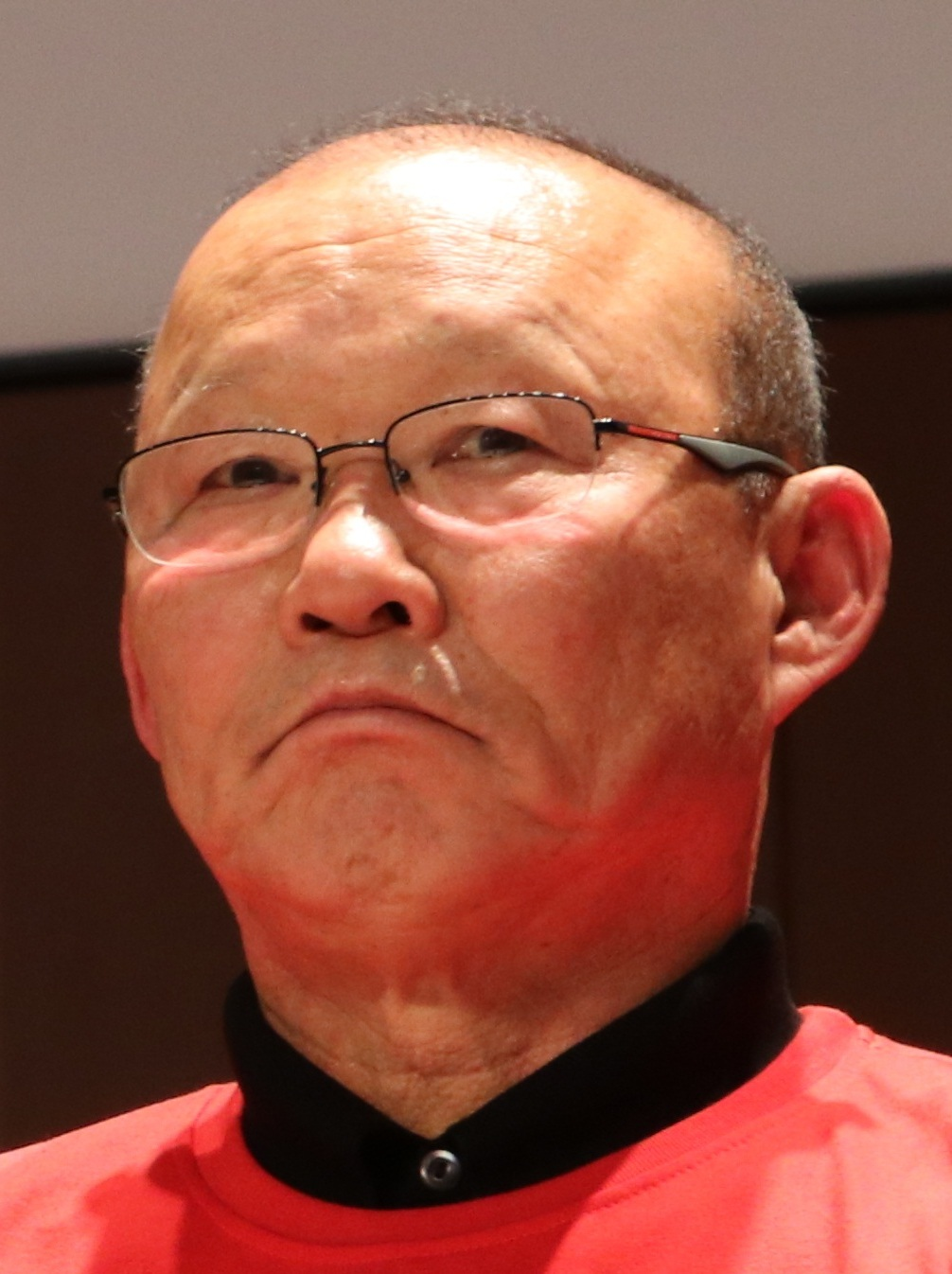
Park Hang-seo, considered the best coach in the history of Vietnamese football.

Position	Name
Head coach	Kim Sang-sik
Assistant coach	Kim Do-heon
Assistant coach	Namkung Do
Assistant coach	Lưu Danh Minh
Assistant coach	Đinh Hồng Vinh
Goalkeeper coach	Lee Woon-jae
Fitness coach	Cédric Roger
Fitness coach	Yoon Dong-hun
Kit manager	Đinh Kim Tuấn
Match analyst	Nguyễn Anh Tuấn
Doctor	Trần Huy Thọ
Doctor	Tuấn Nguyên Giáp
Interpreter	Đỗ Anh Văn
Team manager	Đoàn Anh Tuấn
Team advisor	Phan Thanh Hùng
Technical director	Takeshi Koshida

=== Coaching history ===
As of 17 November 2026

List of Vietnamese coaches since 1991
Name	Nationality	From	To	Pld	W	D	L	GF	GA	Win% (Note: Win% is rounded to two decimal places)	Honours
Nguyễn Kim Hằng	Vietnam	June 1991	June 1991	—	−	−	−	−	−	—	
Vũ Văn Tư	Vietnam	June 1991	July 1991	—	−	−	−	−	−	—	
Nguyễn Sỹ Hiển	Vietnam	July 1991	December 1991	4	0	2	2	5	7	0.00	
Trần Bình Sự	Vietnam	February 1993	June 1993	12	3	0	9	5	21	25.00	
Trần Duy Long (interim)	Vietnam	June 1994	November 1994	—	−	−	−	−	−	—	
Edson Tavares	Brazil	24 November 1994	12 January 1995	1	1	0	0	1	0	100.00	
Karl-Heinz Weigang	Germany	February 1995	March 1997	17	9	2	6	37	33	52.94	
Trần Duy Long	Vietnam	April 1997	8 June 1997	5	0	0	5	2	17	0.00	
Lê Đình Chính (interim)	Vietnam	12 June 1997	22 June 1997	1	0	0	1	0	4	0.00	
Colin Murphy	England	July 1997	October 1997	6	3	1	2	9	6	50.00	
Alfred Riedl	Austria	April 1998	November 2000	31	16	6	9	54	21	51.61	
Dido	Brazil	1 January 2001	25 September 2001	6	3	1	2	9	9	50.00	
Henrique Calisto	Portugal	August 2002	December 2002	10	5	3	2	27	18	50.00	
Alfred Riedl	Austria	January 2003	December 2003	7	3	0	4	8	13	42.86	
Nguyễn Thành Vinh (interim)	Vietnam	January 2004	February 2004	1	0	0	1	0	5	0.00	
Edson Tavares	Brazil	22 March 2004	12 December 2004	11	4	1	6	18	15	36.36	
Trần Văn Khánh (interim)	Vietnam	12 December 2004	15 December 2005	1	1	0	0	3	0	100.00	
Alfred Riedl	Austria	April 2005	October 2007	23	8	8	7	29	27	34.78	
Henrique Calisto	Portugal	June 2008	1 March 2011	42	11	11	20	38	41	26.19	2008 AFF Championship
Falko Götz	Germany	1 June 2011	6 January 2012	5	3	0	2	15	6	60.00	
Mai Đức Chung (interim)	Vietnam	21 February 2012	31 August 2012	3	2	0	1	3	4	66.67	
Phan Thanh Hùng	Vietnam	1 September 2012	31 December 2012	9	3	3	3	9	6	33.33	
Nguyễn Văn Sỹ (interim)	Vietnam	1 January 2013	16 May 2013	2	0	0	2	1	3	0.00	
Hoàng Văn Phúc	Vietnam	16 May 2013	4 April 2014	5	2	0	3	6	13	40.00	
Toshiya Miura	Japan	8 May 2014	28 January 2016	14	7	3	4	12	8	50.00	
Nguyễn Hữu Thắng	Vietnam	3 March 2016	24 August 2017	16	8	6	2	15	14	50.00	
Mai Đức Chung (interim)	Vietnam	24 August 2017	29 September 2017	2	2	0	0	7	1	100.00	
Park Hang-seo	South Korea	29 September 2017	31 January 2023	55	26	15	14	90	46	47.27	2018 AFF Championship
Philippe Troussier	France	1 March 2023	26 March 2024	14	4	0	10	11	25	28.57	
Kim Sang-sik	South Korea	3 May 2024	Present	36	26	4	6	76	30	72.22	2024 ASEAN Championship; 2026 ASEAN Championship

== Players ==
=== Current squad ===
The following 24 players were called up for the 2026 Casper Cup in November 2026.

Information correct as of 17 November 2026, after the match against Kyrgyzstan.

No.	Pos.	Player	Date of birth (age)	Caps	Goals	Club
	GK	Lê Giang Patrik	8 September 1992 (age 34)	14	0	(Vietnam Football Federation) Cong An HCMC
	GK	Trần Trung Kiên	9 February 2003 (age 23)	2	0	(Vietnam Football Federation) Hoang Anh Gia Lai
	GK	Nguyễn Văn Việt	12 July 2002 (age 24)	1	0	(Vietnam Football Federation) The Cong–Viettel
	DF	Nguyễn Thành Chung (captain)	8 September 1997 (age 29)	46	0	(Vietnam Football Federation) Hanoi FC
	DF	Phan Tuấn Tài	7 January 2001 (age 25)	26	0	(Vietnam Football Federation) The Cong–Viettel
	DF	Nguyễn Nhật Minh	27 July 2003 (age 23)	6	0	(Vietnam Football Federation) Cong An HCMC
	DF	Phạm Lý Đức	14 February 2003 (age 23)	3	0	(Vietnam Football Federation) Cong An Nhan Dan
	DF	Lương Chí Khải	2 August 1999 (age 27)	1	0	(Vietnam Football Federation) The Cong–Viettel
	DF	Nguyễn Đức Anh	16 May 2003 (age 23)	1	0	(Vietnam Football Federation) Hanoi FC
	DF	Nguyễn Hồng Phúc	31 May 2003 (age 23)	2	0	(Vietnam Football Federation) SHB Da Nang
	MF	Khuất Văn Khang	11 May 2003 (age 23)	25	1	(Vietnam Football Federation) The Cong–Viettel
	MF	Võ Hoàng Minh Khoa (vice-captain)	12 March 2001 (age 25)	7	0	(Vietnam Football Federation) Becamex HCMC
	MF	Lê Quốc Nhật Nam	23 March 2001 (age 25)	1	0	(Vietnam Football Federation) The Cong–Viettel
	MF	Hoàng Vĩnh Nguyên	3 February 2002 (age 24)	2	0	(Vietnam Football Federation) Hoang Anh Gia Lai
	MF	Trần Ngọc Sơn	27 January 2003 (age 23)	2	0	(Vietnam Football Federation) Thep Xanh Nam Dinh
	MF	Phạm Minh Phúc	7 February 2004 (age 22)	2	0	(Vietnam Football Federation) Cong An Nhan Dan
	MF	Nguyễn Thái Quốc Cường	6 March 2004 (age 22)	1	0	(Vietnam Football Federation) Cong An HCMC
	MF	Nguyễn Quang Vinh	27 January 2005 (age 21)	1	0	(Vietnam Football Federation) Song Lam Nghe An
	FW	Nguyễn Đình Bắc (vice-captain)	19 August 2004 (age 22)	28	12	(Vietnam Football Federation) Cong An Hanoi
	FW	Nguyễn Trần Việt Cường	27 December 2000 (age 25)	7	0	(Vietnam Football Federation) Becamex HCMC
	FW	Nguyễn Văn Tùng	2 June 2001 (age 25)	7	0	(Vietnam Football Federation) Hanoi FC
	FW	Nguyễn Thanh Nhàn	28 July 2003 (age 23)	5	0	(Vietnam Football Federation) Cong An Nhan Dan
	FW	Olaha Mạnh Đức	4 July 1997 (age 29)	1	1	(Vietnam Football Federation) Cong An HCMC
	FW	Nguyễn Đăng Dương	7 September 2005 (age 21)	1	0	(Vietnam Football Federation) Hung Yen

=== Recent call-ups ===
The following players have been called up to the national team in the past 12 months but are not part of the current squad.

Pos.	Player	Date of birth (age)	Caps	Goals	Club	Latest call-up
GK	Đặng Văn Lâm	13 August 1993 (age 33)	48	0	(Vietnam) Ninh Binh	2026 ASEAN Championship
GK	Nguyễn Filip	14 September 1992 (age 34)	12	0	(Vietnam) Cong An Hanoi	v. Malaysia, 31 March 2026
GK	Nguyễn Đình Triệu	4 November 1991 (age 35)	11	0	(Vietnam) Cong An Nhan Dan	v. Bangladesh, 26 March 2026 ^{PRE}
DF	Trương Tiến Anh	25 April 1999 (age 27)	32	1	(Vietnam) Ninh Binh	2026 Casper Cup ^{INJ}
DF	Nguyễn Văn Vĩ	12 February 1998 (age 28)	25	6	(Vietnam) Thep Xanh Nam Dinh	2026 Casper Cup ^{INJ}
DF	Lê Ngọc Bảo	27 March 1998 (age 28)	7	0	(Vietnam) Ninh Binh	2026 Casper Cup ^{INJ}
DF	Phạm Xuân Mạnh	27 March 1996 (age 30)	37	3	(Vietnam) Hanoi FC	2026 FIFA ASEAN Cup
DF	Bùi Hoàng Việt Anh	1 January 1999 (age 27)	34	1	(Vietnam) Cong An Hanoi	2026 FIFA ASEAN Cup
DF	Cao Pendant Quang Vinh	9 February 1997 (age 29)	9	0	(Vietnam) Cong An Hanoi	2026 FIFA ASEAN Cup
DF	Nguyễn Adou Leygley Minh	9 September 1997 (age 29)	4	0	(Vietnam) Cong An Hanoi	2026 FIFA ASEAN Cup
DF	Đoàn Văn Hậu	19 April 1999 (age 27)	47	2	(Vietnam) Cong An Hanoi	2026 ASEAN Championship
DF	Khổng Minh Gia Bảo	26 July 2000 (age 26)	1	0	(Vietnam) Cong An HCMC	2026 ASEAN Championship
DF	Đinh Quang Kiệt	16 July 2007 (age 19)	1	0	(Vietnam) Cong An HCMC	2026 ASEAN Championship
DF	Đỗ Duy Mạnh	29 September 1996 (age 30)	73	2	(Vietnam) Hanoi FC	2026 ASEAN Championship ^{INJ}
DF	Trần Đình Trọng	25 April 1997 (age 29)	16	0	(Vietnam) Cong An Hanoi	v. Malaysia, 31 March 2026
MF	Nguyễn Hai Long	27 August 2000 (age 26)	29	8	(Vietnam) Hanoi FC	2026 Casper Cup ^{INJ}
MF	Nguyễn Hoàng Đức	11 January 1998 (age 28)	68	3	(Vietnam) Ninh Binh	2026 FIFA ASEAN Cup
MF	Lê Phạm Thành Long	5 June 1996 (age 30)	25	0	(Vietnam) Cong An Hanoi	2026 FIFA ASEAN Cup
MF	Đỗ Hoàng Hên	16 May 1994 (age 32)	13	3	(Vietnam) Hanoi FC	2026 FIFA ASEAN Cup
MF	Lê Văn Đô	7 August 2001 (age 25)	4	0	(Vietnam) Cong An Hanoi	2026 FIFA ASEAN Cup
MF	Ngô Đăng Khoa	30 June 2006 (age 20)	3	0	(Vietnam) Cong An HCMC	2026 FIFA ASEAN Cup
MF	Nguyễn Quang Hải (captain)	12 April 1997 (age 29)	88	16	(Vietnam) Cong An Hanoi	2026 FIFA ASEAN Cup ^{INJ}
MF	Nguyễn Ngọc Mỹ	20 April 2004 (age 22)	0	0	(Vietnam) Ninh Binh	2026 ASEAN Championship
MF	Nguyễn Đức Chiến	24 August 1998 (age 28)	7	0	(Vietnam) Ninh Binh	v. Bangladesh, 26 March 2026 ^{PRE}
FW	Nguyễn Lê Phát	12 January 2007 (age 19)	0	0	(Vietnam) Ninh Binh	2026 Casper Cup ^{INJ}
FW	Nguyễn Xuân Son	30 March 1997 (age 29)	18	16	(Vietnam) Thep Xanh Nam Dinh	2026 FIFA ASEAN Cup
FW	Nguyễn Tài Lộc	14 April 1994 (age 32)	11	0	(Vietnam) Ninh Binh	2026 FIFA ASEAN Cup
FW	Phạm Gia Hưng	26 April 2000 (age 26)	6	0	(Vietnam) Ninh Binh	2026 FIFA ASEAN Cup
FW	Williams Minh Hoàng	2 April 2007 (age 19)	4	1	(Vietnam) Cong An HCMC	2026 FIFA ASEAN Cup
FW	Phạm Tuấn Hải	19 May 1998 (age 28)	41	10	(Vietnam) Thep Xanh Nam Dinh	v. Malaysia, 31 March 2026
FW	Nguyễn Tiến Linh	20 October 1997 (age 29)	66	26	(Vietnam) Cong An HCMC	v. Bangladesh, 26 March 2026 ^{PRE}
FW	Đinh Thanh Bình	19 March 1998 (age 28)	10	0	(Vietnam) Cong An Hanoi	v. Bangladesh, 26 March 2026 ^{PRE}
Notes: ^{INJ} Withdrew due to injury; ^{PRE} Preliminary squad / standby; ^{RET} Retired from the national team; ^{SUS} Serving suspension; ^{WD} Withdrew due to non-injury issue

== Player records ==
As of 5 October 2026
Players in bold are still active with Vietnam.

=== Most appearances ===
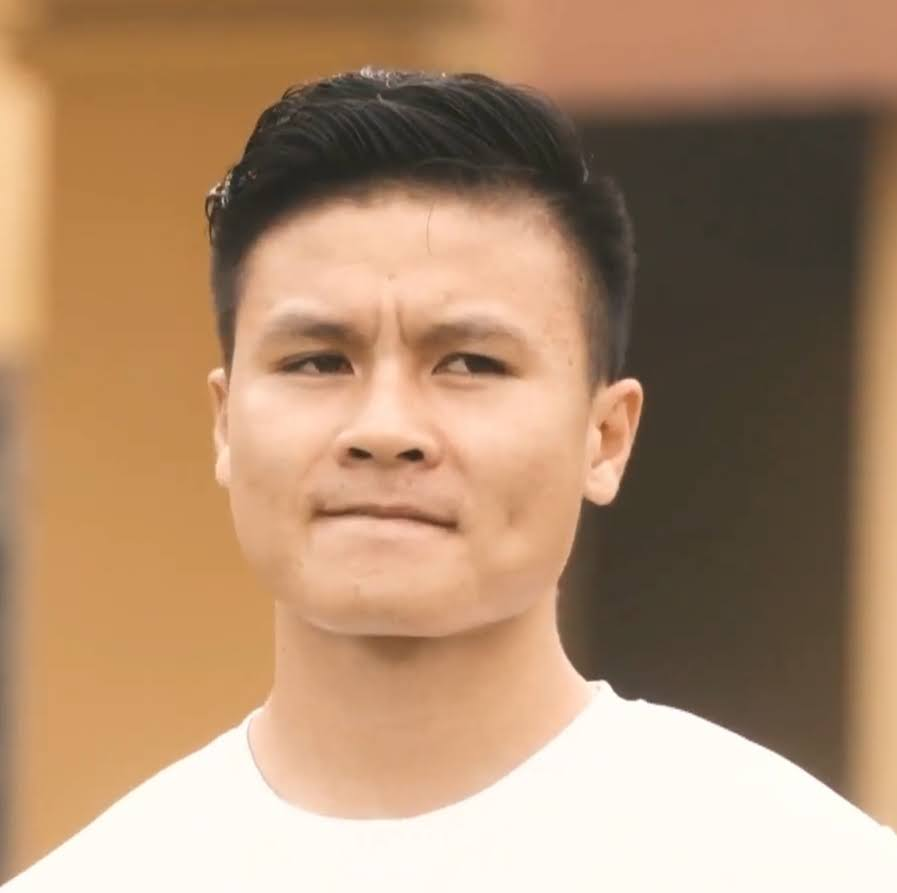
Nguyễn Quang Hải is Vietnam's most capped player.

Rank	Player	Caps	Goals	Career
1	**Nguyễn Quang Hải**	88	16	2017–present
2	Lê Công Vinh	83	51	2004–2016
3	Quế Ngọc Hải	80	6	2014–2024
4	Phạm Thành Lương	78	7	2008–2016
5	Nguyễn Trọng Hoàng	74	12	2009–2022
6	**Đỗ Duy Mạnh**	73	2	2015–present
6	Nguyễn Minh Phương	73	11	2002–2010
8	**Nguyễn Hoàng Đức**	68	3	2019–present
8	Nguyễn Văn Toàn	68	8	2016–2024
9	Lê Huỳnh Đức	67	27	1993–2004

=== Top goalscorers ===
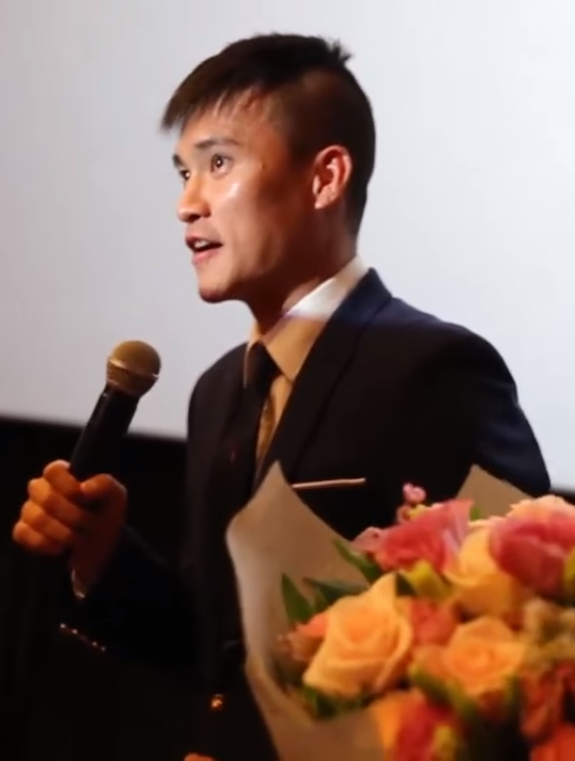
Lê Công Vinh is Vietnam's top goalscorer.

Rank	Player	Goals	Caps	Ratio	Career
1	Lê Công Vinh (list)	51	83	0.61	2004–2016
2	Lê Huỳnh Đức	27	67	0.4	1993–2004
3	**Nguyễn Tiến Linh**	26	66	0.39	2018–present
4	Nguyễn Hồng Sơn	17	53	0.32	1993–2001
5	**Nguyễn Quang Hải**	16	88	0.18	2017–present
5	**Nguyễn Xuân Son**	16	18	0.89	2024–present
5	Nguyễn Văn Quyết	16	58	0.27	2011–2024
8	Phan Thanh Bình	13	31	0.42	2003–2009
9	Nguyễn Trọng Hoàng	12	74	0.16	2009–2022
9	Nguyễn Công Phượng	12	56	0.21	2015–2023
9	Nguyễn Anh Đức	12	36	0.33	2006–2019
9	**Nguyễn Đình Bắc**	12	28	0.43	2023–present

== Records and statistics ==
=== Youngest players ===
Rank	Player	Age	Day	Against	Tournament
1	Phan Thanh Bình	16 years 331 days	27 September 2003	Nepal	2004 AFC Asian Cup qualification
2	Đoàn Văn Hậu	18 years 140 days	5 September 2017	Cambodia	2019 AFC Asian Cup qualification
3	Lê Công Vinh	18 years 183 days	9 June 2004	South Korea	2006 FIFA World Cup qualification
4	Phạm Văn Quyến	18 years 213 days	27 November 2002	Sri Lanka	Friendly
5	Đỗ Duy Mạnh	19 years 9 days	8 October 2015	Iraq	2018 FIFA World Cup qualification

=== Centuriate goals ===
Goals	Date	Scorer	Venue	Opponent	Score	Result	Competition
1.	26 November 1991	Nguyễn Văn Dũng	Manila, Philippines	Philippines	1–0	2–2	1991 SEA Games
100.	25 August 2000	Nguyễn Hồng Sơn	Ho Chi Minh City, Vietnam	Sri Lanka	2–1	2–2	Friendly
200.	24 June 2007	Lê Công Vinh	Hanoi, Vietnam	Jamaica	1–0	3–0	Friendly
300.	16 November 2014	Nguyễn Văn Quyết	Hanoi, Vietnam	Malaysia	2–1	3–1	Friendly
400.	12 December 2021	Nguyễn Quang Hải	Bishan, Singapore	Malaysia	1–0	3–0	2020 AFF Championship
500.	24 July 2026	Đỗ Hoàng Hên	Chonburi, Thailand	Timor-Leste	3–0	7–0	2026 ASEAN Championship

=== ASEAN Championship-winning captains ===
ASEAN Championship winning captains of Vietnam

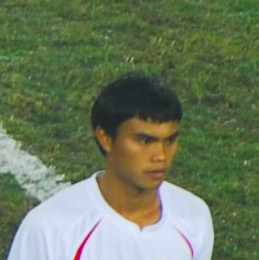
Phan Văn Tài Em in 2008

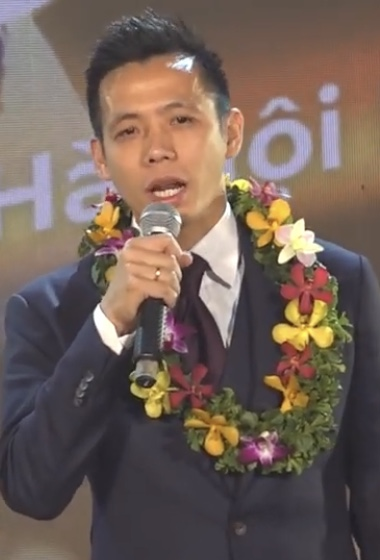
Nguyễn Văn Quyết in 2018

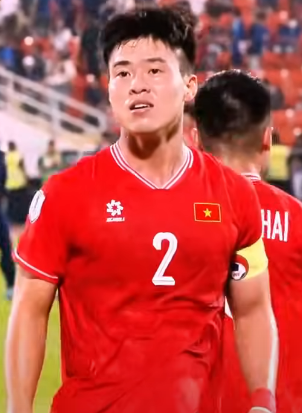
Đỗ Duy Mạnh in 2024/2025

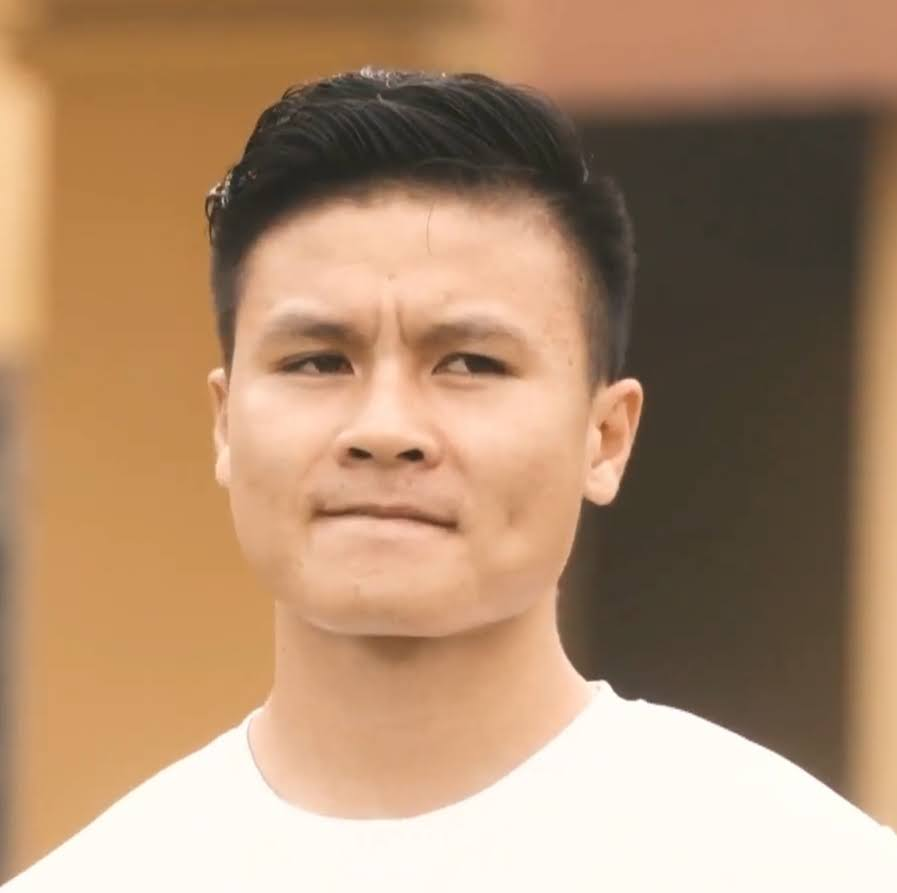
Nguyễn Quang Hải in 2026

Year	Player
2008	Phan Văn Tài Em
2018	Nguyễn Văn Quyết
2024	Đỗ Duy Mạnh
2026	Nguyễn Quang Hải

== Competitive record ==
- 1949–1975 as South Vietnam
- 1991–present as Vietnam

Champions Runners-up Third place Fourth place Hosts or co-hosts

=== FIFA World Cup ===
FIFA World Cup record								Qualification record					
Year	Result	Pld	W	D (Note: Draws include knockout matches decided by a penalty shoot-out.)	L	GF	GA	Pld	W	D	L	GF	GA
(Uruguay) 1930	(Tonkin (French protectorate)) Protectorates of France							(Tonkin (French protectorate)) Protectorates of France					
(Italy) 1934	(Tonkin (French protectorate)) Protectorates of France							(Tonkin (French protectorate)) Protectorates of France					
(France) 1938	(Tonkin (French protectorate)) Protectorates of France							(Tonkin (French protectorate)) Protectorates of France					
as South Vietnam								as South Vietnam					
(Brazil) 1950	Not a FIFA member							Not a FIFA member					
(Switzerland) 1954	Entry not accepted by FIFA							Entry not accepted by FIFA					
(Sweden) 1958	Did not enter							Did not enter					
(Chile) 1962	Did not enter							Did not enter					
(England) 1966	Did not enter							Did not enter					
(Mexico) 1970	Did not enter							Did not enter					
(West Germany) 1974	Did not qualify							3	1	0	2	1	5
as Vietnam								as Vietnam					
(Argentina) 1978	Did not enter							Did not enter					
(Spain) 1982	Did not enter							Did not enter					
(Mexico) 1986	Did not enter							Did not enter					
(Italy) 1990	Did not enter							Did not enter					
(United States) 1994	Did not qualify							8	1	0	7	4	18
(France) 1998	Did not qualify							6	0	0	6	2	21
(South Korea) (Japan) 2002	Did not qualify							6	3	1	2	9	9
(Germany) 2006	Did not qualify							6	1	1	4	5	9
(South Africa) 2010	Did not qualify							2	0	0	2	0	6
(Brazil) 2014	Did not qualify							4	3	0	1	15	5
(Russia) 2018	Did not qualify							6	2	1	3	7	8
(Qatar) 2022	Did not qualify							18	6	3	9	21	24
(Canada) (Mexico) (United States) 2026	Did not qualify							6	2	0	4	6	10
(Morocco) (Portugal) (Spain) 2030 (Note: Additional matches are scheduled to be played in Argentina, Paraguay, and Uruguay in commemoration of the 100th anniversary of the first world cup, however they are not considered to be official hosts of the tournament.)	To be determined							To be determined					
(Saudi Arabia) 2034	To be determined							To be determined					
Total	—	—	—	—	—	—	—	65	19	6	40	70	115

=== AFC Asian Cup ===
AFC Asian Cup record									Qualification record					
Year	Result	Pld	W	D	L	GF	GA	Squad	Pld	W	D	L	GF	GA
as South Vietnam									as South Vietnam					
(Hong Kong) 1956	Fourth place	3	0	1	2	6	9	Squad	2	1	1	0	7	3
(South Korea) 1960	Fourth place	3	0	0	3	2	12	Squad	2	2	0	0	5	1
(Israel) 1964	Did not qualify								3	2	0	1	9	7
(Iran) 1968	Did not qualify								4	2	0	2	4	4
(Thailand) 1972	Withdrew								Withdrew					
(Iran) 1976	Did not qualify								4	0	0	4	1	10
as Vietnam									as Vietnam					
(Kuwait) 1980	Did not enter								Did not enter					
(Singapore) 1984	Did not enter								Did not enter					
(Qatar) 1988	Did not enter								Did not enter					
(Japan) 1992	Did not enter								Did not enter					
(United Arab Emirates) 1996	Did not qualify								3	2	0	1	13	5
(Lebanon) 2000	Did not qualify								3	2	0	1	14	2
(China) 2004	Did not qualify								6	3	0	3	8	13
(Indonesia) (Malaysia) (Thailand) (Vietnam) 2007	Quarter-finals	4	1	1	2	4	7	Squad	Qualified as co-hosts					
(Qatar) 2011	Did not qualify								6	1	2	3	6	11
(Australia) 2015	Did not qualify								6	1	0	5	5	15
(United Arab Emirates) 2019	Quarter-finals	5	1	1	3	5	7	Squad	6	2	4	0	9	3
(Qatar) 2023	Group stage	3	0	0	3	4	8	Squad	8	5	2	1	13	5
(Saudi Arabia) 2027	Qualified								6	6	0	0	17	2
Total	Quarter-finals	12	2	2	8	13	22	—	36	16	6	14	72	51

AFC Asian Cup history
Year	Score	Result
1956	South Vietnam 2–2 Hong Kong	Draw
1956	South Vietnam 1–2 Israel	Loss
1956	South Vietnam 3–5 South Korea	Loss
1960	South Vietnam 1–5 South Korea	Loss
1960	South Vietnam 0–2 Taiwan	Loss
1960	South Vietnam 1–5 Israel	Loss

South Vietnam's AFC Asian Cup record
First match	South Vietnam 2–2 Hong Kong (9 September 1956; Causeway Bay, Hong Kong)
Last match	South Vietnam 1–5 Israel (14 October 1960; Seoul, South Korea)
Biggest win	None
Biggest defeat	South Vietnam 1–5 Israel (14 October 1960; Seoul, South Korea); South Korea 5–1 South Vietnam (19 October 1960; Seoul, South Korea)
Best result	Fourth place in 1956 and 1960
Worst result	None

AFC Asian Cup history
Year	Round	Opponent	Score	Result	Venue
2007	Group stage	United Arab Emirates	2–0	Won	Hanoi, Vietnam
2007	Group stage	Qatar	1–1	Draw	Hanoi, Vietnam
2007	Group stage	Japan	1–4	Loss	Hanoi, Vietnam
2007	Quarter-finals	Iraq	0–2	Loss	Bangkok, Thailand
2019	Group stage	Iraq	2–3	Loss	Abu Dhabi, United Arab Emirates
2019	Group stage	Iran	0–2	Loss	Abu Dhabi, United Arab Emirates
2019	Group stage	Yemen	2–0	Won	Al Ain, United Arab Emirates
2019	Round of 16	Jordan	1–1 (a.e.t.) (4–2 p)	Draw	Dubai, United Arab Emirates
2019	Quarter-finals	Japan	0–1	Loss	Dubai, United Arab Emirates
2023	Group stage	Japan	2–4	Loss	Doha, Qatar
2023	Group stage	Indonesia	0–1	Loss	Doha, Qatar
2023	Group stage	Iraq	2–3	Loss	Al Rayyan, Qatar
2027	Group stage	United Arab Emirates	–		Riyadh, Saudi Arabia
2027	Group stage	South Korea	–		Riyadh, Saudi Arabia
2027	Group stage	Yemen	–		Jeddah, Saudi Arabia

Vietnam's AFC Asian Cup record
First match	Vietnam 2–0 United Arab Emirates (8 July 2007; Hanoi, Vietnam)
Biggest win	Vietnam 2–0 United Arab Emirates (8 July 2007; Hanoi, Vietnam); Vietnam 2–0 Yemen (16 January 2019; Al Ain, United Arab Emirates)
Biggest defeat	Vietnam 1–4 Japan (16 July 2007; Hanoi, Vietnam)
Best result	Quarter-finals in 2007 and 2019
Worst result	22nd in 2023 (group stage)

=== FIFA ASEAN Cup ===
FIFA ASEAN Cup record
Year	Result	Pld	W	D	L	GF	GA	Squad
(Indonesia) 2026 (Note: Challenge Cup hosted by Hong Kong)	Fourth place	4	2	0	2	5	5	Squad
Total	Fourth place	4	2	0	2	5	5	—

FIFA ASEAN Cup history
Year	Round	Opponent	Score	Result	Venue
2026	Group stage	Philippines	1–0	Won	Bandung, Indonesia
2026	Group stage	Thailand	0–2	Loss	Bandung, Indonesia
2026	Group stage	Pakistan	4–2	Won	Jakarta, Indonesia
2026	Third place match	Malaysia	0–1	Loss	Jakarta, Indonesia

Vietnam's FIFA ASEAN Cup record
First match	Vietnam 1–0 Philippines (26 September 2026; Bandung, Indonesia)
Biggest win	Vietnam 4–2 Pakistan (2 October 2026; Jakarta, Indonesia)
Biggest defeat	Thailand 2–0 Vietnam (29 September 2026; Bandung, Indonesia)
Best result	Fourth place in 2026
Worst result	TBD

=== ASEAN Championship ===
Champions Runners-up Third place/Semi-finals Hosts or co-hosts

ASEAN Championship record
Year	Result	Pld	W	D	L	GF	GA	Squad
(Singapore) 1996	Third place	6	3	2	1	14	10	Squad
(Vietnam) 1998	Runners-up	5	3	1	1	8	2	Squad
(Thailand) 2000	Fourth place	6	3	1	2	14	6	Squad
(Indonesia) (Singapore) 2002	Third place	6	4	1	1	21	12	Squad
(Malaysia) (Vietnam) 2004	Group stage	4	2	1	1	13	5	Squad
(Singapore) (Thailand) 2007	Semi-finals	5	1	3	1	10	3	Squad
(Indonesia) (Thailand) 2008	Champions	7	4	2	1	11	6	Squad
(Indonesia) (Vietnam) 2010	Semi-finals	5	2	1	2	8	5	Squad
(Malaysia) (Thailand) 2012	Group stage	3	0	1	2	2	5	Squad
(Singapore) (Vietnam) 2014	Semi-finals	5	3	1	1	12	8	Squad
(Myanmar) (Philippines) 2016	Semi-finals	5	3	1	1	8	6	Squad
(ASEAN) 2018	Champions	8	6	2	0	15	4	Squad
(Singapore) 2020	Semi-finals	6	3	2	1	9	2	Squad
(ASEAN) 2022	Runners-up	8	4	3	1	16	3	Squad
(ASEAN) 2024	Champions	8	7	1	0	21	6	Squad
(ASEAN) 2026	Champions	8	6	2	0	21	3	Squad
Total	4 Titles	95	54	25	16	203	86	16/16

ASEAN Championship history
Year	Round	Opponent	Score	Result	Venue
1996	Group stage	Cambodia	3–1	Won	Jurong, Singapore
1996	Group stage	Laos	1–1	Draw	Jurong, Singapore
1996	Group stage	Myanmar	3–1	Won	Jurong, Singapore
1996	Group stage	Indonesia	1–1	Draw	Jurong, Singapore
1996	Semi-finals	Thailand	2–4	Loss	Kallang, Singapore
1996	Third place play-off	Indonesia	3–2	Won	Kallang, Singapore
1998	Group stage	Laos	4–1	Won	Hanoi, Vietnam
1998	Group stage	Singapore	0–0	Draw	Hanoi, Vietnam
1998	Group stage	Malaysia	1–0	Won	Hanoi, Vietnam
1998	Semi-finals	Thailand	3–0	Won	Hanoi, Vietnam
1998	Final	Singapore	0–1	Loss	Hanoi, Vietnam
2000	Group stage	Malaysia	0–0	Draw	Songkhla, Thailand
2000	Group stage	Cambodia	6–0	Won	Songkhla, Thailand
2000	Group stage	Singapore	1–0	Won	Songkhla, Thailand
2000	Group stage	Laos	5–0	Won	Songkhla, Thailand
2000	Semi-finals	Indonesia	2–3 (a.e.t.)	Loss	Bangkok, Thailand
2000	Third place play-off	Malaysia	0–3	Loss	Bangkok, Thailand
2002	Group stage	Cambodia	9–2	Won	Jakarta, Indonesia
2002	Group stage	Philippines	4–1	Won	Jakarta, Indonesia
2002	Group stage	Indonesia	2–2	Draw	Jakarta, Indonesia
2002	Group stage	Myanmar	4–2	Won	Jakarta, Indonesia
2002	Semi-finals	Thailand	0–4	Loss	Jakarta, Indonesia
2002	Third place play-off	Malaysia	2–1	Won	Jakarta, Indonesia
2004	Group stage	Singapore	1–1	Draw	Ho Chi Minh City, Vietnam
2004	Group stage	Cambodia	9–1	Won	Ho Chi Minh City, Vietnam
2004	Group stage	Indonesia	0–3	Loss	Hanoi, Vietnam
2004	Group stage	Laos	3–0	Won	Hanoi, Vietnam
2007	Group stage	Singapore	0–0	Draw	Kallang, Singapore
2007	Group stage	Indonesia	1–1	Draw	Kallang, Singapore
2007	Group stage	Laos	9–0	Won	Jalan Besar, Singapore
2007	Semi-finals	Thailand	0–2	Loss	Hanoi, Vietnam
2007	Semi-finals	Thailand	0–0	Draw	Bangkok, Thailand
2008	Group stage	Thailand	0–2	Loss	Phuket, Thailand
2008	Group stage	Malaysia	3–2	Won	Phuket, Thailand
2008	Group stage	Laos	4–0	Won	Phuket, Thailand
2008	Semi-finals	Singapore	0–0	Draw	Hanoi, Vietnam
2008	Semi-finals	Singapore	1–0	Won	Kallang, Singapore
2008	Final	Thailand	2–1	Won	Bangkok, Thailand
2008	Final	Thailand	1–1	Draw	Hanoi, Vietnam
2010	Group stage	Myanmar	7–1	Won	Hanoi, Vietnam
2010	Group stage	Philippines	0–2	Loss	Hanoi, Vietnam
2010	Group stage	Singapore	1–0	Won	Hanoi, Vietnam
2010	Semi-finals	Malaysia	0–2	Loss	Kuala Lumpur, Malaysia
2010	Semi-finals	Malaysia	0–0	Draw	Hanoi, Vietnam
2012	Group stage	Myanmar	1–1	Draw	Bangkok, Thailand
2012	Group stage	Philippines	0–1	Loss	Bangkok, Thailand
2012	Group stage	Thailand	1–3	Loss	Bangkok, Thailand
2014	Group stage	Indonesia	2–2	Draw	Hanoi, Vietnam
2014	Group stage	Laos	3–0	Won	Hanoi, Vietnam
2014	Group stage	Philippines	3–1	Won	Hanoi, Vietnam
2014	Semi-finals	Malaysia	2–1	Won	Shah Alam, Malaysia
2014	Semi-finals	Malaysia	2–4	Loss	Hanoi, Vietnam
2016	Group stage	Myanmar	2–1	Won	Yangon, Myanmar
2016	Group stage	Malaysia	1–0	Won	Yangon, Myanmar
2016	Group stage	Cambodia	2–1	Won	Naypyidaw, Myanmar
2016	Semi-finals	Indonesia	1–2	Loss	Bogor, Indonesia
2016	Semi-finals	Indonesia	2–2 (a.e.t.)	Draw	Hanoi, Vietnam
2018	Group stage	Laos	3–0	Won	Vientiane, Laos
2018	Group stage	Malaysia	2–0	Won	Hanoi, Vietnam
2018	Group stage	Myanmar	0–0	Draw	Yangon, Myanmar
2018	Group stage	Cambodia	3–0	Won	Hanoi, Vietnam
2018	Semi-finals	Philippines	2–1	Won	Bacolod, Philippines
2018	Semi-finals	Philippines	2–1	Won	Hanoi, Vietnam
2018	Finals	Malaysia	2–2	Draw	Kuala Lumpur, Malaysia
2018	Finals	Malaysia	1–0	Won	Hanoi, Vietnam
2020	Group stage	Laos	2–0	Won	Bishan, Singapore
2020	Group stage	Malaysia	3–0	Won	Bishan, Singapore
2020	Group stage	Indonesia	0–0	Draw	Bishan, Singapore
2020	Group stage	Cambodia	4–0	Won	Bishan, Singapore
2020	Semi-finals	Thailand	0–2	Loss	Kallang, Singapore
2020	Semi-finals	Thailand	0–0	Draw	Kallang, Singapore
2022	Group stage	Laos	6–0	Won	Vientiane, Laos
2022	Group stage	Malaysia	3–0	Won	Hanoi, Vietnam
2022	Group stage	Singapore	0–0	Draw	Jalan Besar, Singapore
2022	Group stage	Myanmar	3–0	Won	Hanoi, Vietnam
2022	Semi-finals	Indonesia	0–0	Draw	Jakarta, Indonesia
2022	Semi-finals	Indonesia	2–0	Won	Hanoi, Vietnam
2022	Finals	Thailand	2–2	Draw	Hanoi, Vietnam
2022	Finals	Thailand	0–1	Loss	Pathum Thani, Thailand
2024	Group stage	Laos	4–1	Won	Vientiane, Laos
2024	Group stage	Indonesia	1–0	Won	Phú Thọ, Vietnam
2024	Group stage	Philippines	1–1	Draw	Manila, Philippines
2024	Group stage	Myanmar	5–0	Won	Phú Thọ, Vietnam
2024	Semi-finals	Singapore	2–0	Won	Jalan Besar, Singapore
2024	Semi-finals	Singapore	3–1	Won	Phú Thọ, Vietnam
2024	Final	Thailand	2–1	Won	Phú Thọ, Vietnam
2024	Final	Thailand	3–2	Won	Bangkok, Thailand
2026	Group stage	Timor-Leste	7–0	Won	Chonburi, Thailand
2026	Group stage	Singapore	0–0	Draw	Hanoi, Vietnam
2026	Group stage	Indonesia	3–0	Won	Bogor, Indonesia
2026	Group stage	Cambodia	3–1	Won	Hanoi, Vietnam
2026	Semi-finals	Malaysia	2–0	Won	Kuala Lumpur, Malaysia
2026	Semi-finals	Malaysia	2–0	Won	Hanoi, Vietnam
2026	Final	Thailand	2–0	Won	Bangkok, Thailand
2026	Final	Thailand	2–2	Draw	Hanoi, Vietnam

Vietnam's ASEAN Championship record
First match	Vietnam 3–1 Cambodia (2 September 1996; Jurong, Singapore)
Biggest win	Vietnam 9–0 Laos (17 January 2007; Jalan Besar, Singapore)
Biggest defeat	Vietnam 0–4 Thailand (27 December 2002; Jakarta, Indonesia)
Best result	Champions in 2008, 2018, 2024, and 2026
Worst result	6th in 2004 and 2012 (group stage)

=== Olympic Games ===
Gold medal Sliver medal Bronze medal Fourth place Hosts or co-hosts

Olympic Games record									Qualification record					
Year	Result	Pos.	Pld	W	D	L	GF	GA	Pld	W	D	L	GF	GA
(Greece) 1896	No official football competition								No official football competition					
(French Third Republic) 1900	Only club teams participated								Only club teams participated					
(United States) 1904	Only club teams participated								Only club teams participated					
(United Kingdom) 1908	(Tonkin (French protectorate)) Protectorates of France								(Tonkin (French protectorate)) Protectorates of France					
(Sweden) 1912	(Tonkin (French protectorate)) Protectorates of France								(Tonkin (French protectorate)) Protectorates of France					
(Belgium) 1920	(Tonkin (French protectorate)) Protectorates of France								(Tonkin (French protectorate)) Protectorates of France					
(French Third Republic) 1924	(Tonkin (French protectorate)) Protectorates of France								(Tonkin (French protectorate)) Protectorates of France					
(Netherlands) 1928	(Tonkin (French protectorate)) Protectorates of France								(Tonkin (French protectorate)) Protectorates of France					
(United States) ~~1932~~	No tournament held								No tournament held					
(Nazi Germany) 1936	(Tonkin (French protectorate)) Protectorates of France								(Tonkin (French protectorate)) Protectorates of France					
(United Kingdom) 1948	(Tonkin (French protectorate)) Protectorates of France								(Tonkin (French protectorate)) Protectorates of France					
as South Vietnam									as South Vietnam					
(Finland) 1952	Did not enter								No qualification					
(Australia) 1956	Qualified, but withdrew								2	2	0	0	9	5
(Italy) 1960	Did not enter								Did not enter					
(Japan) 1964	Did not qualify								4	1	1	2	4	6
(Mexico) 1968	Did not qualify								5	2	1	2	14	5
(West Germany) 1972	Did not enter								Did not enter					
as Vietnam									as Vietnam					
(Canada) 1976	Did not enter								Did not enter					
(Soviet Union) 1980	Did not enter								Did not enter					
(United States) 1984	Did not enter								Did not enter					
(South Korea) 1988	Did not enter								Did not enter					
Since 1992	See Vietnam national under-23 football team								See Vietnam national under-23 football team					
Total	0/19	–	–	–	–	–	–	–	11	5	2	4	27	16

=== Asian Games ===
Gold medal Sliver medal Bronze medal Fourth place Hosts or co-hosts

Asian Games record
Year	Result	Pos.	Pld	W	D	L	GF	GA
as South Vietnam
(India) 1951	Did not participate							
(Philippines) 1954	Preliminary round	7/12	2	1	0	1	5	5
(Japan) 1958	Quarter-finals	7/14	3	1	1	1	8	5
(Indonesia) 1962	Fourth place	4/8	5	2	0	3	12	8
(Thailand) 1966	Preliminary round	7/11	3	1	1	1	2	6
(Thailand) 1970	Preliminary round	9/10	2	0	0	2	0	3
(Iran) 1974	Did not enter							
as Vietnam
(Thailand) 1978	Did not enter							
(India) 1982	Did not enter							
(South Korea) 1986	Did not enter							
(China) 1990	Did not enter							
(Japan) 1994	Did not enter							
(Thailand) 1998	Group stage	17/23	2	0	0	2	0	6
Since 2002	See Vietnam national under-23 football team							
Total	Fourth Place	6/13	2	0	0	2	0	6

Asian Games History
Year	Round	Score	Result
1954	Round 1	Vietnam 2–3 Taiwan	Loss
1954	Round 1	Vietnam 3–2 Philippines	Win
1958	Round 1	South Vietnam 1–1 Pakistan	Draw
1958	Round 1	South Vietnam 6–1 Malaya	Win
1958	Quarter-finals	South Vietnam 1–3 South Korea	Loss
1962	Round 1	South Vietnam 0–1 Indonesia	Loss
1962	Round 1	South Vietnam 6–0 Philippines	Win
1962	Round 1	South Vietnam 3–0 Malaya	Win
1962	Semi-finals	South Vietnam 2–3 India	Loss
1962	Bronze medal	South Vietnam 1–4 Malaya	Loss
1966	Round 1	South Vietnam 2–1 Taiwan	Win
1966	Round 1	South Vietnam 0–0 Indonesia	Draw
1966	Round 1	South Vietnam 0–5 Singapore	Loss
1970	Round 1	South Vietnam 0–2 India	Loss
1970	Round 1	South Vietnam 0–1 Thailand	Loss

Asian Games History
Year	Round	Opponent	Scores	Result	Venue
1998	Group stage	Turkmenistan	0–2	Loss	Nakhon Sawan, Thailand
1998	Group stage	South Korea	0–4	Loss	Nakhon Sawan, Thailand

=== Southeast Asian Games ===
Gold medal Sliver medal Bronze medal Fourth place Hosts or co-hosts

Southeast Asian Games record
Year	Result	Pos.	Pld	W	D	L	GF	GA
as South Vietnam
(Thailand) 1959	Champions	1st	4	3	0	1	11	3
(Myanmar) 1961	Third place	4th	3	1	1	1	8	2
(Malaysia) 1965	Third place	3rd	4	2	0	2	8	5
(Thailand) 1967	Runners-up	2nd	3	2	0	1	11	2
(Myanmar) 1969	Group stage	5th	2	0	1	1	1	2
(Malaysia) 1971	Third place	3rd	4	1	2	1	5	4
(Singapore) 1973	Runners-up	2nd	4	1	1	2	9	7
as Vietnam
(Thailand) 1975	Did not enter							
(Malaysia) 1977	Did not enter							
(Indonesia) 1979	Did not enter							
(Philippines) 1981	Did not enter							
(Singapore) 1983	Did not enter							
(Thailand) 1985	Did not enter							
(Indonesia) 1987	Did not enter							
(Malaysia) 1989	Did not enter							
(Philippines) 1991	Group stage	6th	3	0	1	2	3	5
(Singapore) 1993	Group stage	6th	3	1	0	2	1	3
(Thailand) 1995	Silver medal	2nd	6	4	0	2	10	8
(Indonesia) 1997	Bronze medal	3rd	6	3	1	2	9	6
(Brunei) 1999	Silver medal	2nd	6	4	1	1	14	2
Since 2001	See Vietnam national under-23 football team							
Total	Silver medal	11/20	24	12	3	9	37	24

Southeast Asian Games History
Year	Round	Score	Result
1959	Group stage	South Vietnam 4–0 Thailand	Win
1959	Group stage	South Vietnam 3–0 Burma	Win
1959	Group stage	South Vietnam 2–1 Malaya	Win
1959	Gold medal match	South Vietnam 3–1 Thailand	Win
1961	Group stage	South Vietnam 0–0 Thailand	Draw
1961	Group stage	South Vietnam 7–0 Laos	Win
1961	Semi-finals	South Vietnam 1–2 Burma	Lose
1961	Bronze medal match	South Vietnam 1–1 Thailand	Draw
1965	Group stage	South Vietnam 1–2 Thailand	Lose
1965	Group stage	South Vietnam 5–1 Singapore	Win
1965	Semi-finals	South Vietnam 0–2 Thailand	Lose
1965	Bronze medal match	South Vietnam 2–0 Malaysia	Win
1967	Group stage	South Vietnam 5–0 Laos	Win
1967	Semi-finals	South Vietnam 5–0 Thailand	Win
1967	Gold medal match	South Vietnam 1–2 Burma	Lose
1969	Group stage	South Vietnam 1–2 Malaysia	Lose
1969	Group stage	South Vietnam 0–0 Laos	Draw
1971	Group stage	South Vietnam 0–0 Burma	Draw
1971	Group stage	South Vietnam 3–1 Singapore	Win
1971	Semi-finals	South Vietnam 2–3 Malaysia	Lose
1971	Bronze medal match	South Vietnam 0–0 Thailand	Draw
1973	Group stage	South Vietnam 2–3 Burma	Lose
1973	Group stage	South Vietnam 5–1 Laos	Win
1973	Semi-finals	South Vietnam 1–1 (5–3 p) Singapore	Win
1973	Gold medal match	South Vietnam 2–3 Burma	Lose

Southeast Asian Games history
Year	Round	Opponent	Score	Result	Venue
1991	Group stage	Philippines	2–2	Draw	Manila, Philippines
1991	Group stage	Indonesia	0–1	Loss	Manila, Philippines
1991	Group stage	Malaysia	1–2	Loss	Manila, Philippines
1993	Group stage	Indonesia	0–1	Loss	Kallang, Singapore
1993	Group stage	Philippines	1–0	Won	Kallang, Singapore
1993	Group stage	Singapore	0–2	Loss	Kallang, Singapore
1995	Group stage	Malaysia	2–0	Won	Chiang Mai, Thailand
1995	Group stage	Cambodia	4–0	Won	Lamphun, Thailand
1995	Group stage	Thailand	1–3	Loss	Chiang Mai, Thailand
1995	Group stage	Indonesia	1–0	Won	Lamphun, Thailand
1995	Semi-finals	Myanmar	2–1	Won	Chiang Mai, Thailand
1995	Gold medal match	Thailand	0–4	Loss	Chiang Mai, Thailand
1997	Group stage	Malaysia	0–1	Loss	Jakarta, Indonesia
1997	Group stage	Indonesia	2–2	Draw	Jakarta, Indonesia
1997	Group stage	Laos	2–1	Won	Jakarta, Indonesia
1997	Group stage	Philippines	3–0	Won	Jakarta, Indonesia
1997	Semi-finals	Thailand	1–2	Loss	Jakarta, Indonesia
1997	Bronze medal match	Singapore	1–0	Won	Jakarta, Indonesia
1999	Group stage	Laos	9–0	Won	Bandar Seri Begawan, Brunei
1999	Group stage	Myanmar	2–0	Won	Bandar Seri Begawan, Brunei
1999	Group stage	Thailand	0–0	Draw	Bandar Seri Begawan, Brunei
1999	Group stage	Philippines	2–0	Won	Bandar Seri Begawan, Brunei
1999	Semi-finals	Indonesia	1–0	Won	Bandar Seri Begawan, Brunei
1999	Gold medal match	Thailand	0–2	Loss	Bandar Seri Begawan, Brunei

=== VFF Vietnam International Friendly Cup ===
Champions Runners-up Third place Fourth place

VFF Cup record
Year	Result	Pos.	Pld	W	D	L	GF	GA
2004 Agribank Cup	Runners-up	2/4	3	2	0	1	4	3
2006 Agribank Cup	Runners-up	2/4	3	2	1	0	5	2
2008 T&T Cup	Runners-up	2/3	2	0	2	0	2	2
2010 VFF Son Ha Cup	Fourth place	4/4	3	0	1	2	1	5
2011 Eximbank Cup	Runners-up	2/4	3	2	1	0	5	2
2012 VFF Cup	Third place	3/4	3	1	1	1	5	2
2022 VFF Tri-Nations Series	Champions	1/3	2	2	0	0	7	0
2024 LPBank Cup	Not finished due to Typhoon Yagi							
2024 VFF Tri-Nations Series	Canceled due to Lebanon pulling out following the 2024 Israeli invasion of Lebanon							
Total	1 Title	6/6	16	7	5	4	24	14

Vietnam Football Federation Cup history
Year	Round	Opponent	Score	Result	Venue
2004 Agribank Cup	Group stage	(Thailand) Thai League XI	1–0	Win	Hanoi, Vietnam
2004 Agribank Cup	Group stage	(Brazil) Santa Cruz	1–0	Win	Hanoi, Vietnam
2004 Agribank Cup	Group stage	(Portugal) Porto B	1–2	Loss	Hanoi, Vietnam
2006	Group stage	New Zealand	2–1	Win	Hanoi, Vietnam
2006	Group stage	Bahrain	1–0	Win	Hanoi, Vietnam
2006	Group stage	Thailand	2–2	Draw	Hanoi, Vietnam
2008 T&T Cup	Group stage	North Korea	0–0	Draw	Hanoi, Vietnam
2008 T&T Cup	Group stage	Thailand	2–2	Draw	Hanoi, Vietnam
2010 VFF Son Ha Cup	Group stage	South Korea University XI	0–2	Loss	Hanoi, Vietnam
2010 VFF Son Ha Cup	Group stage	Singapore	1–1	Draw	Hanoi, Vietnam
2010 VFF Son Ha Cup	Group stage	North Korea	0–2	Loss	Hanoi, Vietnam
2012 VFF Cup	Group stage	Turkmenistan	0–1	Loss	Hanoi, Vietnam
2012 VFF Cup	Group stage	Laos	4–0	Win	Hanoi, Vietnam
2012 VFF Cup	Group stage	South Korea University XI	1–1	Draw	Hanoi, Vietnam
2022 VFF Tri-Nations Series	Group stage	Singapore	4–0	Win	Ho Chi Minh City, Vietnam
2022 VFF Tri-Nations Series	Group stage	India	3–0	Win	Ho Chi Minh City, Vietnam
2024 LPBank Cup	Group stage	Russia	0–3	Loss	Hanoi, Vietnam
2024 LPBank Cup	Group stage	Thailand	1–2	Loss	Hanoi, Vietnam

== Head-to-head record ==
As of 17 November 2026 after match against Kyrgyzstan.

Positive Record Neutral Record Negative Record

Team	Pld	W	D	L	GF	GA	Win%	Confederation
Afghanistan	3	1	2	0	3	1	33.33	AFC
Albania	1	0	0	1	0	5	0.00	UEFA
Algeria	1	0	0	1	0	5	0.00	CAF
Australia	4	0	0	4	0	7	0.00	AFC
Bahrain	1	1	0	0	5	3	100.00	AFC
Bangladesh	4	2	2	0	8	1	50.00	AFC
Bosnia and Herzegovina	1	0	0	1	0	4	0.00	UEFA
Cambodia	31	18	8	5	73	30	58.06	AFC
China	16	1	2	13	17	46	6.25	AFC
Chinese Taipei	15	7	4	4	31	19	46.67	AFC
Cuba	2	1	1	0	3	2	50.00	CONCACAF
Curaçao	1	0	1	0	1	1	0.00	CONCACAF
Egypt^{1}	1	0	0	1	1	4	0.00	CAF
Estonia	1	1	0	0	1	0	100.00	UEFA
Guam	2	2	0	0	20	0	100.00	AFC
Guinea	1	1	0	0	2	1	100.00	CAF
Hong Kong	22	10	4	8	34	31	45.45	AFC
India	18	7	3	8	22	25	38.89	AFC
Indonesia	51	17	13	21	67	75	33.33	AFC
Iran	2	0	1	1	2	4	0.00	AFC
Iraq	7	0	1	6	6	14	0.00	AFC
Israel	4	1	0	3	4	8	25.00	UEFA
Jamaica	1	1	0	0	3	0	100.00	CONCACAF
Japan	13	3	1	9	13	27	23.08	AFC
Jordan	4	0	4	0	3	3	0.00	AFC
Kazakhstan	1	1	0	0	2	1	100.00	UEFA
North Korea	14	1	4	9	9	27	7.14	AFC
South Korea	28	2	7	19	19	62	7.14	AFC
Kuwait	3	1	0	2	3	5	33.33	AFC
Kyrgyzstan	2	0	0	2	2	4	0.00	AFC
Laos	25	23	2	0	97	6	92.00	AFC
Lebanon	5	1	3	1	5	5	20.00	AFC
Macau	2	2	0	0	13	1	100.00	AFC
Malaysia^{2}	65	35	10	20	100	94	53.85	AFC
Maldives	2	1	0	1	4	3	50.00	AFC
Mozambique	1	1	0	0	1	0	100.00	CAF
Mongolia	3	3	0	0	8	1	100.00	AFC
Myanmar	28	13	4	11	65	36	46.43	AFC
Nepal	4	4	0	0	11	1	100.00	AFC
New Zealand	2	2	0	0	6	2	100.00	OFC
Oman	4	0	0	4	1	12	0.00	AFC
Pakistan	3	1	2	0	7	5	33.33	AFC
Palestine	3	2	0	1	7	3	66.67	AFC
Philippines	21	17	2	2	80	16	80.95	AFC
Qatar	6	2	1	3	5	14	33.33	AFC
Russia	1	0	0	1	0	3	0.00	UEFA
Saudi Arabia	4	0	0	4	1	13	0.00	AFC
Singapore	42	23	14	5	76	42	54.76	AFC
Sri Lanka	4	1	3	0	7	6	25.00	AFC
Syria	4	2	1	1	3	1	50.00	AFC
Tajikistan	2	0	0	2	0	8	0.00	AFC
Thailand	62	26	13	23	90	84	41.94	AFC
Timor-Leste	1	1	0	0	7	0	100.00	AFC
Turkmenistan	6	1	0	5	4	12	16.67	AFC
United Arab Emirates	7	2	0	5	6	16	28.57	AFC
Uzbekistan	3	0	0	3	1	8	0.00	AFC
Yemen^{3}	2	2	0	0	9	0	100.00	AFC
Zimbabwe	1	0	0	1	0	6	0.00	CAF
56 countries and 3 territories	552	230	112	212	961	811		

- Including both North Vietnam and South Vietnam
- ^{1} includes the results of United Arab Republic
- ^{2} includes the results of Malaya
- ^{3} includes the results of North Yemen

=== Regional record ===
Last meet up against Southeast Asia countries
Opponents	Date	Score	Result	Match type
Brunei	Haven't met yet			
Cambodia	7 August 2026	3−1	Won	2026 ASEAN Championship
Indonesia	3 August 2026	3−0	Won	2026 ASEAN Championship
Laos	19 November 2025	2–0	Won	2027 AFC Asian Cup qualification
Malaysia	5 October 2026	0−1	Loss	2026 FIFA ASEAN Cup
Myanmar	18 July 2026	4−0	Won	Friendly
Philippines	26 September 2026	1−0	Won	2026 FIFA ASEAN Cup
Singapore	31 July 2026	0−0	Draw	2026 ASEAN Championship
Timor-Leste	24 July 2026	7–0	Won	2026 ASEAN Championship
Thailand	29 September 2026	0−2	Lost	2026 FIFA ASEAN Cup

== FIFA World Rankings ==
- Vietnam's placement on the FIFA Rankings

Vietnam's FIFA world rankings
1993	1994	1995	1996	1997	1998	1999	2000	2001	2002	2003	2004	2005	2006	2007	2008
135	▼151	▲122	▲99	▼104	▲98	▼102	▲99	▼105	▼108	▲98	▼103	▼120	▼172	▲142	▼155
2009	2010	2011	2012	2013	2014	2015	2016	2017	2018	2019	2020	2021	2022	2023	2024
▲123	▼137	▲99	▼131	▼144	▲137	▼147	▲134	▲112	▲100	▲97	▲94	▼98	▲97	▲95	▼114
2025	2026														
▲107	▲99														

== Honours ==
=== Regional ===
- ASEAN Championship
  - Champions (4): 2008, 2018, 2024, 2026
  - Runners-up (2): 1998, 2022
  - Third place (2): 1996, 2002
- SEA Games
  - Gold medal (1): 1959
  - Silver medal (4): 1967, 1973, 1995, 1999
  - Bronze medal (4): 1961, 1965, 1971, 1997

=== Friendly ===
- Quốc Khánh Cup (6): 1961, 1962, 1965, 1966, 1970, 1974
  - Runners-up (2): 1971, 1972
- King's Cup
  - Runners-up (2): 2006, 2019
  - Third place (2): 1969, 1971
- Merdeka Tournament (1): 1966
- Pesta Sukan Cup (1): 1971
- Thai Army Cup (1): 1974
- AYA Bank Cup (1): 2016
- VFF Cup (1): 2022

== See also ==
=== Men's ===
- Vietnam national under-23 football team
- Vietnam national under-20 football team
- Vietnam national under-17 football team
- Vietnam national futsal team
- Vietnam national under-20 futsal team
- Vietnam national under-17 futsal team
- Vietnam national beach soccer team

=== Women's ===
- Vietnam women's national football team
- Vietnam women's national under-20 football team
- Vietnam women's national under-17 football team
- Vietnam women's national futsal team

== Notes ==
Achievements
Preceded by 2007 Singapore	ASEAN Champions; 2008 (First title)	Succeeded by 2010 Malaysia
Preceded by 2016 Thailand	ASEAN Champions; 2018 (Second title)	Succeeded by 2020 Thailand
Preceded by 2022 Thailand	ASEAN Champions; 2024 (Third title)	Succeeded by TBD
Awards
Preceded by Thailand	AFF Team of the Year; 2019	Succeeded by Incumbent
