= Iraq national under-23 football team results =

List of football games played by the Iraq national under-23 football team since 1995.

== Results ==
=== 1990s ===
1995

22 September 1995 1996 Olympics qualification	Qatar	0–0	Iraq	Doha, Qatar

29 September 1995 1996 Olympics qualification	Jordan	0–4	Iraq	Amman, Jordan
			Chathir, Fawzi; Wahaib

13 October 1995 1996 Olympics qualification	Iraq	3–2	Qatar	Al-Shaab Stadium, Baghdad
	Chathir, Ali

20 October 1995 1996 Olympics qualification	Iraq	1–1	Jordan	Al-Shaab Stadium, Baghdad
	Ali

1996

6 March 1996 Friendly	China	4–1	Iraq	Nanhai, China
			Sabbar

8 March 1996 Friendly	China	0–1	Iraq	Shenzhen, China
			Obeid

16 March 1996 1996 Olympics qualification	Iraq	1–1	Japan	Kuala Lumpur, Malaysia
	Wahaib 58'

18 March 1996 1996 Olympics qualification	Iraq	3–1	United Arab Emirates	Kuala Lumpur, Malaysia
	Wahaib 31'; Fawzi 51'; Chathir 89'

20 March 1996 1996 Olympics qualification	Iraq	1–0	Oman	Kuala Lumpur, Malaysia
	Chathir 62'

24 March 1996 1996 Olympics qualification	South Korea	2–1	Iraq	Kuala Lumpur, Malaysia
			Hamad 89'

27 March 1996 1996 Olympics qualification	Saudi Arabia	1–0	Iraq	Kuala Lumpur, Malaysia

1999

12 January 1999 Friendly	Vietnam	0–0	Iraq	Hanoi, Vietnam

22 January 1999 Friendly	Vietnam	0–3	Iraq	Hanoi, Vietnam
			Hussein; Abdul-Jabbar; Ahmed

13 April 1999 Friendly	Iraq	2–0	Jordan	Al-Shaab Stadium, Baghdad
	Rahim; Mohammed

21 April 1999 Friendly	China	3–0	Iraq	Shanghai, China

23 June 1999 Friendly	Malaysia	1–1	Iraq	Kuala Lumpur, Malaysia
			Mezher

3 July 1999 2000 Olympics qualification	Iraq	4–2	Jordan	Amman, Jordan
	Khudhair 2', 41'; Mezher 8'; Hassan 34'

5 July 1999 2000 Olympics qualification	Iraq	1–1	Saudi Arabia	Amman, Jordan
	Rahim 37'

10 July 1999 2000 Olympics qualification	Jordan	5–0	Iraq	Amman, Jordan

12 July 1999 2000 Olympics qualification	Iraq	2–2	Saudi Arabia	Amman, Jordan
	Ridha 20'; Abdul-Jabbar 38'

=== 2000s ===
2002

20 November 2002 Friendly	Qatar	2–1	Iraq	Doha, Qatar
			Mnajed 36'

23 November 2002 Friendly	Bahrain	2–2	Iraq	Manama, Bahrain
			A.Salah 62'; L.Salah 87'

2003

2 February 2003 Friendly	Syria	1–3	Iraq	Damascus, Syria
			Munir 25'; Karim 45'; Mohammed 46'

4 February 2003 Friendly	Syria	1–5	Iraq	Damascus, Syria
			Jawad 28'; Abdulsada 32'; Mohammed 51'; Mahmoud 66', 85'

2 August 2003 Abha Championship	Saudi Arabia	0–1	Iraq	Abha, Saudi Arabia
			Mnajed 32'

9 August 2003 Abha Championship	Iraq	2–2	Senegal	Abha, Saudi Arabia
	Mahmoud 12'; Akram 78'

13 August 2003 Abha Championship	Iraq	0–0 (a.e.t.) (4–3 p)	Syria	Abha, Saudi Arabia

15 August 2003 Abha Championship	Iraq	1–0	Morocco	Abha, Saudi Arabia
	Mahmoud 81'

10 September 2003 2004 Olympics qualification	Iraq	3–1	Vietnam	Damascus, Syria
	Mnajed 20', 73'; Mahmoud 76'

17 September 2003 2004 Olympics qualification	Vietnam	1–1	Iraq	Hanoi, Vietnam
			Sadir 32'

22 September 2003 2004 Olympics qualification	North Korea	2–0	Iraq	Pyongyang, North Korea

8 November 2003 2004 Olympics qualification	Iraq	4–1	North Korea	Amman, Jordan
	Salah 14'; Mahmoud 64'; Mohammed 73'; Munir 79'

2004

3 March 2004 2004 Olympics qualification	Iraq	4–0	Oman	Amman, Jordan
	Akram 54'; Mahmoud 55'; Karim 75'; Mohammed 89'

17 March 2004 2004 Olympics qualification	Saudi Arabia	1–0	Iraq	Dammam, KSA

24 March 2004 2004 Olympics qualification	Iraq	2–1	Kuwait	Zarqa, Jordan
	H.M.Mohammed 6'; Mahmoud 80'

6 April 2004 Friendly	South Korea	1–0	Iraq	Seoul, South Korea
	Kim Dong-hyun 37'			Stadium: Seoul World Cup Stadium; Attendance: 25,204; Referee: Kashihara (Japan)

14 April 2004 2004 Olympics qualification	Kuwait	2–0	Iraq	Kuwait City, Kuwait

28 April 2004 2004 Olympics qualification	Oman	2–0	Iraq	Muscat, Oman

12 May 2004 2004 Olympics qualification	Iraq	3–1	Saudi Arabia	Amman, Jordan
	Abdul-Amir 27'; Sadir 60'; H.M.Mohammed 89'

12 August 2004 2004 Olympics	Iraq	4–2	Portugal	Pampeloponnisiako Stadium, Patras
20:30	E. Mohammed 16'; H. Mohammed 29'; Mahmoud 56'; Sadir 90+3'	Report	Jabar 13' (o.g.); Bosingwa 45'	Attendance: 5,689; Referee: Divine Evehe (Cameroon)

15 August 2004 2004 Olympics	Costa Rica	0–2	Iraq	Karaiskakis Stadium, Athens
20:30		Report	H. Mohammed 67'; Karim 72'	Attendance: 12,150; Referee: Charles Ariiotima (Tahiti)

18 August 2004 2004 Olympics	Morocco	2–1	Iraq	Pampeloponnisiako Stadium, Patras
20:30	Bouden 69' (pen.); Aqqal 77'	Report	Sadir 63'	Attendance: 4,019; Referee: Horacio Elizondo (Argentina)

21 August 2004 2004 Olympics	Iraq	1–0	Australia	Pankritio Stadium, Heraklion
18:00	E. Mohammed 64'	Report		Attendance: 10,023; Referee: Carlos Batres (Guatemala)

24 August 2004 2004 Olympics	Iraq	1–3	Paraguay	Kaftanzoglio Stadium, Thessaloniki
21:00	Farhan 83'	Report	Cardozo 17', 34'; Bareiro 68'	Attendance: 6,213; Referee: Éric Poulat (France)

27 August 2004 2004 Olympics	Italy	1–0	Iraq	Kaftanzoglio Stadium, Thessaloniki
20:30	Gilardino 8'	Report		Attendance: 5,203; Referee: Jorge Larrionda (Uruguay)

2006

18 November 2006 2006 Asian Games	Indonesia	0–6	Iraq	Al-Ahli Stadium, Doha
18:00			Jassim 18'; Abid Ali 24'; Karim 36' (pen.), 63'; Mansour 82'; Rehema 89'	Attendance: 1,300; Referee: Yang Zhiqiang (China)

21 November 2006 2006 Asian Games	Iraq	2–0	Singapore	Al-Ahli Stadium, Doha
18:00	Karim 5'; Mahmoud 7'			Attendance: 300; Referee: Abdullah Balideh (Qatar)

24 November 2006 2006 Asian Games	Iraq	0–0	Syria	Al-Ahli Stadium, Doha
18:00				Attendance: 2,200; Referee: Ramachandran Krishnan (Malaysia)

29 November 2006 2006 Asian Games	China	1–0	Iraq	Al-Arabi Stadium, Doha
19:45	Haibin 7'			Attendance: 615; Referee: Abdulrahman Abdou (Qatar)

3 December 2006 2006 Asian Games	Oman	0–2	Iraq	Al-Arabi Stadium, Doha
19:45			Rehema 30'; Abdul-Zahra 45+2'	Attendance: 2,373; Referee: Ajjagowder Arjunan (India)

6 December 2006 2006 Asian Games	Malaysia	0–4	Iraq	Al-Arabi Stadium, Doha
19:45			Rehema 14'; Mahmoud 54', 55'; Karim 65'	Attendance: 2,357; Referee: Nasser Darwish (Jordan)

9 December 2006 2006 Asian Games	Uzbekistan	1–2 (a.e.t.)	Iraq	Al-Gharafa Stadium, Al-Rayyan
16:00	Geynrikh 45+1'		Jassim 10'; Mansour 95'	Attendance: 2,525; Referee: Ramachandran Krishnan (Malaysia)

12 December 2006 2006 Asian Games	Iraq	1–0	South Korea	Al-Gharafa Stadium, Al-Rayyan
16:00	Saeed 24'			Attendance: 3,150; Referee: Ali Al-Badwawi (United Arab Emirates)

15 December 2006 2006 Asian Games	Qatar	1–0	Iraq	Al-Sadd Stadium, Doha
16:00	Mohammed 63'			Attendance: 15,000; Referee: Hiroyoshi Takayama (Japan)

2007

28 February 2007 2008 Olympics qualification	Iraq	3–0	India	King Abdullah Stadium, Amman
15:00 UTC+03:00	Karim 51'; Abdul-Zahra 65'; Aboodi 70'	Report		Attendance: 1,500; Referee: Atallah Jatli Al-Enezi (Kuwait)

14 March 2007 2008 Olympics qualification	North Korea	2–2	Iraq	Kim Il-sung Stadium, Pyongyang
15:00 UTC+09:00	An Chol-Hyok 44'; Kim Kwang-Hyok 69'	Report	Abdul-Zahra 32'; Rehema 90'	Attendance: 58,000; Referee: Hasan Tayeb Shamsuzzaman (Bangladesh)

28 March 2007 2008 Olympics qualification	Iraq	1–1	Thailand	Prince Mohammad International Stadium, Zarqa
17:00 UTC+03:00	Saeed 22'	Report	Teeratep 49'	Attendance: 3,000; Referee: Mukhtar Al-Yarimi (Yemen)

18 April 2007 2008 Olympics qualification	Thailand	0–1	Iraq	Thai Army Sports Stadium, Bangkok
19:00 UTC+07:00		Report	Jassim 90+2'	Attendance: 3,200; Referee: Hiroyoshi Takayama (Japan)

16 May 2007 2008 Olympics qualification	India	1–1	Iraq	Jawaharlal Nehru Stadium, Delhi
18:00 UTC+05:30	Saikh 72'	Report	Jassim 54'	Attendance: 5,000; Referee: Muhsen Basma (Syria)

6 June 2007 2008 Olympics qualification	Iraq	1–0	North Korea	King Abdullah Stadium, Amman
21:00 UTC+03:00	Jassim 63'	Report		Attendance: 5,000; Referee: Ravshan Irmatov (Uzbekistan)

22 August 2007 2008 Olympics qualification	Iraq	0–0	Australia	Al-Rayyan Stadium, Al-Rayyan
19:00 UTC+3				Attendance: 1,500; Referee: Sun Baojie (China PR)

8 September 2007 2008 Olympics qualification	Lebanon	0–5	Iraq	Beirut Municipal Stadium, Beirut
20:45 UTC+3			Saeed 22'; Abdul-Zahra 59', 89'; Ali Abbas 72'; Karrar Jassim 76'	Attendance: 0 Referee: Mohamed Al Saeedi (United Arab Emirates)

12 September 2007 2008 Olympics qualification	Iraq	2–0	North Korea	Al-Rayyan Stadium, Al-Rayyan (Qatar)
20:30 UTC+3	Ibrahim 21'; Abdul-Zahra 69'			Referee: Abdulrahman Abdou (Qatar)

17 October 2007 2008 Olympics qualification	North Korea	0–0	Iraq	Kim Il-sung Stadium, Pyongyang
16:00 UTC+9				Attendance: 17,000; Referee: Hasan Tayeb (Bangladesh)

17 November 2007 2008 Olympics qualification	Australia	2–0	Iraq	Bluetongue Central Coast Stadium, Gosford
19:00 UTC+10	Leijer 19'; Milligan 58'			Attendance: 13,888; Referee: Malik Abdul Bashir (Singapore)

21 November 2007 2008 Olympics qualification	Iraq	5–2	Lebanon	Al-Rayyan Stadium, Al-Rayyan (Qatar)
16:00 UTC+3	Abdul-Zahra 8', 23', 81'; Mustafa 30'; Samer Saeed 37'		Hassan Maatouk 59' (pen.); Al Saadi 72' (pen.)	Attendance: 100; Referee: Khalil Al Ghamdi (Saudi Arabia)

=== 2010s ===
2011

19 June 2011 2012 Olympics qualification	Iraq	3–0 (awarded)	Iran	Franso Hariri Stadium, Erbil
18:00		Report	Mosalman 30'	Attendance: 18,000; Referee: Choi Myung-Yong (South Korea)

23 June 2011 2012 Olympics qualification	Iran	0–2	Iraq	Azadi Stadium, Tehran
20:00		Report	Radhi 35', 63'	Attendance: 18,739; Referee: Yuichi Nishimura (Japan)

21 September 2011 2012 Olympics qualification	Uzbekistan	2–0	Iraq	JAR Stadium, Tashkent
18:00	Temurkhuja 71'; Turaev 78'	Report		Attendance: 7,223; Referee: Kim Dong-Jin (South Korea)

22 November 2011 2012 Olympics qualification	Iraq	0–0	Australia	Al Arabi Stadium, Doha
17:15		Report		Attendance: 200; Referee: Andre El Haddad (Lebanon)

27 November 2011 2012 Olympics qualification	United Arab Emirates	3–0 (awarded)	Iraq	Sheikh Khalifa International Stadium, Al Ain
18:20		Report	Abdul-Raheem 21'; Sabah 77'	Attendance: 6,432; Referee: Abdulrahman Hussain (Qatar)

2012

5 February 2012 2012 Olympics qualification	Iraq	0–1	United Arab Emirates	Al Arabi Stadium, Doha
16:45		Report	Ali 3'	Attendance: 420; Referee: Nawaf Shukralla (Bahrain)

21 February 2012 2012 Olympics qualification	Iraq	2–1	Uzbekistan	Al Arabi Stadium, Doha
16:45	M. Abdullah 45+2' (pen.); Ahmad 88'	Report	Musaev 23'	Attendance: 100; Referee: Tan Hai (China PR)

14 March 2012 2012 Olympics qualification	Australia	0–0	Iraq	Central Coast Stadium, Gosford
19:30		Report		Attendance: 2,071; Referee: Yuichi Nishimura (Japan)

23 June 2012 2013 AFC U-22 Q	Iraq	4–0	Turkmenistan	Royal Oman Police Stadium, Muscat
19:45	Shokan 24' (pen.); Adnan 42'; Abdul-Raheem 54'; Kamil 86'			Attendance: 50; Referee: Ali Abdulnabi (Bahrain)

25 June 2012 2013 AFC U-22 Q	Iraq	2–1	India	Royal Oman Police Stadium, Muscat
19:45	Alialah 34'; Abdul-Hussein 48'		George 83'	Attendance: 75; Referee: Mohd Nafeez Abdul Wahab (Malaysia)

28 June 2012 2013 AFC U-22 Q	Lebanon	1–5	Iraq	Sultan Qaboos Sports Complex, Muscat
17:00	El Baba 77'		Abdul-Raheem 45+2'; Abdul-Hussein 64'; Abbas 79'; Faez 84'; Adnan 90+1' (pen.)	Attendance: 50; Referee: Dmitriy Mashentsev (Kyrgyzstan)

30 June 2012 2013 AFC U-22 Q	Iraq	1–1	Oman	Sultan Qaboos Sports Complex, Muscat
20:00	Nadhim 57'		Al-Saadi 62'	Attendance: 300; Referee: Akbar Bakhshizadeh (Iran)

3 July 2012 2013 AFC U-22 Q	United Arab Emirates	0–0	Iraq	Royal Oman Police Stadium, Muscat
20:00				Attendance: 100; Referee: Yousef Al-Marzouq (Kuwait)

2013

19 September 2013 2013 Islamic Solidarity	Iraq	2–3	Turkey	Bumi Sriwijaya Stadium, Palembang
15:30 WIB	Kalaf 13'; Salah 68'	Report	Alkan 57', 90+4'; Nişancı 85'	Referee: Ilgiz Tantashev (Uzbekistan)

23 September 2013 2013 Islamic Solidarity	Iraq	0–0	Syria	Bumi Sriwijaya Stadium, Palembang
15:30 WIB				Referee: Phongsanit Xaypaseuth (Laos)

25 September 2013 2013 Islamic Solidarity	Saudi Arabia	2–2	Iraq	Gelora Sriwijaya Stadium, Palembang
15:30 WIB	Saleh Mohammed Jamaan 34'; Omar Salman Sahimi 43'		Waleed 48'; Kalaf 54'	Referee: Rosy Faulur (Indonesia)

2014

12 January 2014 2013 AFC U-22 Championship	Saudi Arabia	1–3	Iraq	Seeb Stadium, Seeb
20:00	Majrashi 89'	Report	Ismail 36'; Hussein 50', 69'	Attendance: 484; Referee: Abdulla Hassan Mohamed (United Arab Emirates)

14 January 2014 2013 AFC U-22 Championship	Iraq	2–1	Uzbekistan	Seeb Stadium, Seeb
17:00	Hussein 10'; Nadhim 38'	Report	Iskanderov 64'	Attendance: 510; Referee: Mohd Amirul Izwan Bin Yaacob (Malaysia)

16 January 2014 2013 AFC U-22 Championship	China	0–1	Iraq	Royal Oman Police Stadium, Muscat
20:00		Report	Hussein 14' (pen.)	Attendance: 300; Referee: Hettikamkanamge Perera (Sri Lanka)

20 January 2014 2013 AFC U-22 Championship	Iraq	1–0	Japan	Seeb Stadium, Seeb
20:00	Kalaf 84'	Report		Attendance: 2,250; Referee: Mohd Amirul Izwan Bin Yaacob (Malaysia)

23 January 2014 2013 AFC U-22 Championship	South Korea	0–1	Iraq	Seeb Stadium, Seeb
17:00		Report	Nadhim 74'	Attendance: 2,600; Referee: Muhammad Taqi Aljaafari Bin Jahari (Singapore)

26 January 2014 2013 AFC U-22 Championship	Saudi Arabia	0–1	Iraq	Seeb Stadium, Seeb
19:30		Report	Abdul-Raheem 33'	Attendance: 4,700; Referee: Abdulla Hassan Mohamed (United Arab Emirates)

14 September 2014 2014 Asian Games	Iraq	4–0	Nepal	Football Stadium, Incheon
14:00	Rasan 5'; Mahmoud 45+1'; Chand 85' (o.g.); Bahjat 90+2'	Report		Referee: Ma Ning (China)

17 September 2014 2014 Asian Games	Japan	1–3	Iraq	Goyang Stadium, Goyang
20:00	Nakajima 36'	Report	Tariq 12'; Adnan 48', 72'	Referee: Charymurat Kurbanov (Turkmenistan)

21 September 2014 2014 Asian Games	Kuwait	0–3	Iraq	Hwaseong Stadium, Hwaseong
14:00		Report	Tariq 16', 62'; Hussein 71'	Referee: Abdullah Balideh (Qatar)

26 September 2014 2014 Asian Games	Iraq	4–2	Tajikistan	Football Stadium, Incheon
16:00	Tariq 7'; Shaker 47'; Adnan 62'; Nadhim 84'	Report	Vasiev 37'; Fatkhuloev 88'	Referee: Ko Hyung-jin (South Korea)

28 September 2014 2014 Asian Games	Saudi Arabia	0–3	Iraq	Goyang Stadium, Goyang
17:00		Report	Mahmoud 10', 29'; Al-Shamekh 49' (o.g.)	Referee: Ahmed Al-Kaf (Oman)

30 September 2014 2014 Asian Games	Iraq	0–1 (a.e.t.)	North Korea	Football Stadium, Incheon
17:00		Report	Jong Il-gwan 96'	Referee: Ma Ning (China)

2 October 2014 2014 Asian Games	Thailand	0–1	Iraq	Football Stadium, Incheon
17:00		Report	Mahmoud 62'	Referee: Ko Hyung-jin (South Korea)

2015

12 March 2015 Friendly	Iraq	2–1	Jordan	Dubai, UAE
	Hussein

18 March 2015 Friendly	Iraq	2–1	Saudi Arabia	Dubai, UAE
	Natiq; Waleed

20 March 2015 Friendly	United Arab Emirates	1–1	Iraq	Dubai, UAE
			Hussein

25 March 2015 2016 AFC U-23 Q	Lebanon	1–4	Iraq	Muscat, Oman
			Hussein 44'; Kamil 72', 85'; Waleed 81'	Stadium: Sultan Qaboos Sports Complex, Muscat

27 March 2015 2016 AFC U-23 Q	Iraq	7–1	Maldives	Muscat, Oman
	Waleed 3', 65'; Kamil 45'; Rasan 47', 90+3'; Tariq 76'; Husni 90+2'			Stadium: Sultan Qaboos Sports Complex, Muscat

29 March 2015 2016 AFC U-23 Q	Bahrain	0–2	Iraq	Muscat, Oman
			Hussein 84'; Waleed 88'	Stadium: Sultan Qaboos Sports Complex, Muscat

31 March 2015 2016 AFC U-23 Q	Iraq	2–2	Oman	Muscat, Oman
	Mabrook 3' (o.g.); Kamel 47'			Stadium: Sultan Qaboos Sports Complex, Muscat

23 December 2015 Friendly	Jordan	0–1	Iraq	Amman, Jordan
			Faez 80'

29 December 2015 Friendly	Iraq	1–0	China	Dubai, UAE
	Fayyadh 67'

2016

2 January 2016 Friendly	Iraq	3–1	North Korea	Dubai, UAE
	Hussein 34', 51'; Ali 85'

6 January 2016 Friendly	Iraq	3–0	Saudi Arabia	Dubai, UAE
	Hussein; Attwan

13 January 2016 2016 AFC U-23 Championship	Iraq	2–0	Yemen	Suheim Bin Hamad Stadium, Doha
19:30	Faez 36' (pen.); Husni 39'	Report		Attendance: 545; Referee: Ryuji Sato Japan

16 January 2016 2016 AFC U-23 Championship	Uzbekistan	2–3	Iraq	Suheim Bin Hamad Stadium, Doha
19:30	Khamdamov 1'; Khakimov 79'	Report	Attwan 38'; Kamil 43'; Tariq 84'	Attendance: 686; Referee: Ahmed Al-Kaf Oman

19 January 2016 2016 AFC U-23 Championship	Iraq	1–1	South Korea	Grand Hamad Stadium, Doha
19:30	Waleed 90+2'	Report	Kim Hyun 22'	Attendance: 1,086; Referee: Abdulrahman Al-Jassim Qatar

23 January 2016 2016 AFC U-23 Championship	United Arab Emirates	1–3	Iraq	Grand Hamad Stadium, Doha
19:30	Mhawi 75' (o.g.)	Report	Husni 77'; Abdul-Raheem 103'; Attwan 120+3'	Attendance: 1,030; Referee: Chris Beath Australia

26 January 2016 2016 AFC U-23 Championship	Japan	2–1	Iraq	Abdullah bin Khalifa Stadium, Doha
16:30	Kubo 26'; Harakawa 90+3'	Report	Natiq 43'	Attendance: 1,489; Referee: Mohd Amirul Izwan Malaysia

29 January 2016 2016 AFC U-23 Championship	Qatar	1–2	Iraq	Jassim Bin Hamad Stadium, Doha
17:45	A. Alaa 27'	Report	Abdul-Raheem 86'; Hussein 109'	Referee: Ahmed Al-Kaf (Oman)

13 July 2016 Friendly	Algeria	2–3	Iraq	Algiers, Algeria

17 July 2016 Friendly	Algeria	2–0	Iraq	Algiers, Algeria

24 July 2016 Friendly	South Korea	0–1	Iraq	Brasília, Brazil

4 August 2016 2016 Olympic Games	Iraq	0–0	Denmark	Estádio Nacional Mané Garrincha, Brasília
13:00				Attendance: 18,000; Referee: César Arturo Ramos (Mexico)

7 August 2016 2016 Olympic Games	Brazil	0–0	Iraq	Estádio Nacional Mané Garrincha, Brasília
22:00				Attendance: 65,829; Referee: Ovidiu Hațegan (Romanian)

10 August 2016 2016 Olympic Games	South Africa	1–1	Iraq	Arena Corinthians, São Paulo
22:00	Motupa 6'	Report (Rio2016); Report (FIFA)	Abdul-Amir 14'	Attendance: 37,742; Referee: Roddy Zambrano (Ecuador)

2017

10 June 2017 Friendly	Thailand	1–1	Iraq	Chonburi Stadium, Chonburi
(UTC+7)	Sittichok 83' (pen.)		Jaffal 48'

26 June 2017 Friendly	Iraq	2–0	Syria	Karbala Sports City, Karbala
	Hussein 57'; Shakor 87' (pen.)

29 June 2017 Friendly	Iraq	1–1	Syria	Karbala Sports City, Karbala
	Hussein 42'		Naji 28'

12 July 2017 Friendly	Jordan	0–1	Iraq	Amman International Stadium, Amman

19 July 2017 2018 AFC U-23 Q	Iraq	8–0	Afghanistan	Prince Faisal bin Fahd Stadium, Riyadh
17:55	Rasan 13' (pen.); Hussein 39' (pen.), 45', 65', 74', 85'; Mhawi 82'; Jaffal 86'	Report		Attendance: 500; Referee: Sultan Abdulrazzaq Al Marzooqi (United Arab Emirates)

21 July 2017 2018 AFC U-23 Q	Bahrain	1–2	Iraq	Prince Faisal bin Fahd Stadium, Riyadh
17:55	Madan 84'	Report	Attwan 52'; Fayyadh 70'	Attendance: 200; Referee: Yaqoob Said Abdullah Abdul Baqi (Oman)

23 July 2017 2018 AFC U-23 Q	Iraq	2–0	Saudi Arabia	Prince Faisal bin Fahd Stadium, Riyadh
20:55	Ali 23'; Hussein 45+1'	Report		Attendance: 500; Referee: Yaqoob Abdul Baki (Oman)

2018

10 January 2018 2018 AFC U-23 Championship	Iraq	4–1	Malaysia	Changshu Stadium, Changshu
16:00	Jaffal 5'; Attwan 28'; Mhawi 56'; Al-Saedi 81'	Report	Safawi 79'	Attendance: 230; Referee: Valentin Kovalenko (Uzbekistan)

13 January 2018 2018 AFC U-23 Championship	Saudi Arabia	0–0	Iraq	Changshu Stadium, Changshu
		Report		Attendance: 1,010; Referee: Ma Ning (China)

16 January 2018 2018 AFC U-23 Championship	Iraq	1–0	Jordan	Changshu Stadium, Changshu
	Resan 49'	Report		Attendance: 380; Referee: Mohammed Abdulla Hassan Mohamed (United Arab Emirates)

20 January 2018 2018 AFC U-23 Championship	Iraq	3–3 (a.e.t.) (3–5 p)	Vietnam	Changshu Stadium, Changshu
	Hussein 29' (pen.), 94'; Mhawi 116'	Report	Nguyễn Công Phượng 12'; Phan Văn Đức 108'; Hà Đức Chinh 112'	Attendance: 980; Referee: Chris Beath (Australia)
	Penalties
	(penalty missed) Resan; (penalty scored) Hussein; (penalty scored) Mhawi; (penalty scored) Attwan		(penalty scored) Vũ Văn Thanh; (penalty scored) Nguyễn Quang Hải; (penalty scored) Lương Xuân Trường; (penalty scored) Hà Đức Chinh; (penalty scored) Bùi Tiến Dụng

25 July 2018 Friendly	Iraq	2–1	Iran	Franso Hariri Stadium, Erbil

29 July 2018 Friendly	Iraq	0–1	Iran	Franso Hariri Stadium, Erbil

2019

8 March 2019 Friendly	Qatar	0–1	Iraq	Aspire 5, Doha

22 March 2019 2020 AFC U-23 Q	Iraq	5–0	Yemen	Shahid Dastgerdi Stadium, Tehran
	Fouad 16', 44' (pen.); H. Jabbar 35'; Subeh 65' (pen.), 79'	Report		Attendance: 102; Referee: Muhammad Taqi (Singapore)

24 March 2019 2020 AFC U-23 Q	Turkmenistan	0–2	Iraq	Shahid Dastgerdi Stadium, Tehran
		Report	Subeh 17'; S. Jabbar 88'	Attendance: 157; Referee: Pranjal Banerjee (India)

26 March 2019 2020 AFC U-23 Q	Iraq	0–0	Iran	Azadi Stadium, Tehran
		Report		Attendance: 2,520; Referee: Muhammad Taqi (Singapore)

6 September 2019 Friendly	Bahrain	0–2	Iraq	National Stadium, Manama

9 September 2019 Friendly	Bahrain	1–0	Iraq	National Stadium, Manama

=== 2020s ===
2020

8 January 2020 2020 AFC U-23 Championship	Iraq	1–1	Australia	Thammasat Stadium, Rangsit
	Nassif 77'		Piscopo 62'	Referee: Fu Ming (China)

11 January 2020 2020 AFC U-23 Championship	Bahrain	2–2	Iraq	Thammasat Stadium, Rangsit
	Isa 44'; Marhoon 86'		Al-Ammari 65'; Nassif 90+2'	Referee: Ko Hyung-jin (South Korea)

14 January 2020 2020 AFC U-23 Championship	Thailand	1–1	Iraq	Rajamangala Stadium, Bangkok

2021

4 October 2021 2021 WAFF U-23 Championship	Palestine	0–1	Iraq	Dammam, Saudi Arabia
15:30		Report	Abdul Karim 81'	Stadium: Prince Mohamed bin Fahd Stadium; Referee: Mokhtar Al-Arami (Yemen)

6 October 2021 2021 WAFF U-23 Championship	Iraq	2–0	United Arab Emirates	Khobar, Saudi Arabia
21:30	Zamel 41'; Abdul Amir 94'			Stadium: Prince Saud bin Jalawi Stadium

8 October 2021 2021 WAFF U-23 Championship	Lebanon	2–2	Iraq	Dammam, Saudi Arabia
21:30				Stadium: Prince Mohamed bin Fahd Stadium

10 October 2021 2021 WAFF U-23 Championship	Saudi Arabia	1–0	Iraq	Dammam, Saudi Arabia
20:30				Stadium: Prince Mohamed bin Fahd Stadium

27 October 2021 2022 AFC U-23 Asian Cup qualification	Iraq	4–0	Maldives	Arad, Bahrain
				Stadium: Al Muharraq Stadium

31 October 2021 2022 AFC U-23 Asian Cup qualification	Iraq	3–0	Bahrain	Arad, Bahrain
				Stadium: Al Muharraq Stadium

2022

23 March 2022 2022 Dubai Cup	Vietnam	0–0	Iraq	Dubai, United Arab Emirates
				Stadium: The Sevens Stadium

26 March 2022 2022 Dubai Cup	Iraq	1–2	Saudi Arabia	Dubai, United Arab Emirates

29 March 2022 2022 Dubai Cup	Thailand	1–2	Iraq	Dubai, United Arab Emirates
19:00 UTC+4	Weidersjö 45'		Aoraha 16'; Ramadan 90+5'	Stadium: The Sevens Stadium

24 May 2022 Friendly	Iraq	0–1	Iran	Baghdad, Iraq
				Stadium: Al-Madina Stadium

27 May 2022 Friendly	Iraq	3–1	Iran	Baghdad, Iraq
	Ammar 1'; Aoraha 57'; Abdulkareem 64'		50'	Stadium: Al-Madina Stadium

1 June 2022 2022 AFC U-23 Asian Cup	Jordan	1–1	Iraq	Markaziy Stadium, Qarshi
22:00 UTC+5	Aburiziq 57'	Live Report; Stats Report	Ramadhan 69'	Attendance: 417; Referee: Khalid Al-Turais (Saudi Arabia)

4 June 2022 2022 AFC U-23 Asian Cup	Iraq	1–1	Australia	Markaziy Stadium, Qarshi
18:00 UTC+5	Abdulkareem 56'	Live Report; Stats Report	Kuol 45+2'	Attendance: 492; Referee: Akhrol Riskullaev (Uzbekistan)

7 June 2022 2022 AFC U-23 Asian Cup	Iraq	3–1	Kuwait	Qarshi, Uzbekistan
18:00 UTC+5	Mohammed 35'; Abdulridha 59'; Al-Baqer 82'	Live Report; Stats Report	Ayedh 12'	Stadium: Markaziy Stadium; Attendance: 1,850; Referee: Omar Al-Ali (United Arab Emirates)

11 June 2022 2022 AFC U-23 Asian Cup QF	Uzbekistan	2–2 (a.e.t.) (3–2 p)	Iraq	Tashkent, Uzbekistan
21:00 UTC+5	Jaloliddinov 45+5' (pen.); Ammar 50' (o.g.)	Live Report; Stats Report	Ramadhan 19' (pen.); Ghaleb 68'	Stadium: Pakhtakor Stadium; Referee: Mohammed Al-Hoish (Saudi Arabia)
	Penalties
	Jurakuziyev (penalty scored); Khamraliev (penalty missed); Fayzullaev (penalty scored); Buriev (penalty scored)		(penalty scored) Doski; (penalty scored) Naeem; (penalty missed) Ramadhan; (penalty missed) Abdulridha; (penalty missed) Abdulkareem

2023

22 March 2023 2023 Doha Cup	Iraq	3–0	Vietnam	Doha, Qatar
22:45 UTC+3	Ali Almosawe 45+1' (pen.); Ahmed Maknzi 60'; Dhulfiqar Younis 85'			Stadium: Al-Gharrafa Stadium

25 March 2023 2023 Doha Cup	Iraq	0–1	South Korea	Doha, Qatar
20:30 UTC+3			Goh Young-joon 89'	Stadium: Suheim bin Hamad Stadium

28 March 2023 2023 Doha Cup	Iraq	1–0	Oman	Doha, Qatar
23:30 UTC+3	Hussein Abdullah 77'			Stadium: Grand Hamad Stadium

12 June 2023 2023 WAFF U-23 Championship	Jordan	2–2	Iraq	Baghdad, Iraq
21:45 UTC+3	Mohammed Abu Alnadi 22' (pen.) 50'		Blnd Hassan 19'; Hussein Abdullah 29'	Stadium: Al-Madina Stadium; Referee: Faisal Al-Balawi

16 June 2023 2023 WAFF U-23 Championship	Iraq	3–0	United Arab Emirates	Baghdad, Iraq
21:45 UTC+3				Stadium: Al-Madina Stadium

18 June 2023 2023 WAFF U-23 Championship	Iraq	1–0	Oman	Baghdad, Iraq
				Stadium: Al-Madina Stadium

20 June 2023 2023 WAFF U-23 Championship	Iran	1–1 (4-5 p)	Iraq	Baghdad, Iraq
				Stadium: Al-Madina Stadium

21 August 2023 Friendly	Iraq	4–2	Sudan	Basra, Iraq
	Ridha Fadhil; Ali Jassim; Mustafa Walid			Stadium: Basra International Stadium

25 August 2023 Friendly	Iraq	1–1	Sudan	Basra, Iraq
	Amir Faisal			Stadium: Basra International Stadium

28 August 2023 Friendly	Iraq	3–0	Yemen	Basra, Iraq
	Ridha Fadhil; Dhulfiqar Younis; Hussein Abdullah			Stadium: Basra International Stadium

31 August 2023 Friendly	Iraq	1–2	Oman	Basra, Iraq
	Zaid Tahseen 6'			Stadium: Basra International Stadium

6 September 2023 2024 AFC U-23 Asian Cup qualification	Iraq	13–0	Macau	Kuwait City, Kuwait
18:00 UTC+3	Hussein Abdullah 9' 59' (pen.); Alexander Aoraha 15' 45+6'; Ali Jassim 26' 44'; Ridha Fadhil 37' 47' 57'; Blnd Hassan 42'; Zaid Tahseen 63'; Dhulfiqar Younis 65'; Muntadher Abdul-Amir 86'			Stadium: Al Kuwait Sports Club Stadium

9 September 2023 2024 AFC U-23 Asian Cup qualification	Timor-Leste	0–6	Iraq	Kuwait City, Kuwait
18:00 UTC+3				Stadium: Al Kuwait Sports Club Stadium

12 September 2023 2024 AFC U-23 Asian Cup qualification	Iraq	2–2	Kuwait	Kuwait City, Kuwait
20:00 UTC+3				Stadium: Jaber Al-Ahmad International Stadium

12 October 2023 Friendly	Morocco	0–1	Iraq	Casablanca, Morocco
			Al-Hamawi 42'	Stadium: Père Jégo Stadium

14 October 2023 Friendly	Iraq	3–1	Dominican Republic	Casablanca, Morocco
	Hussein Abdullah 6'; Alexander Aoraha 15'; Siyaband Ageed 86'			Stadium: Père Jégo Stadium

18 November 2023 Friendly	United States	1–1	Iraq	San Pedro del Pinatar, Spain
11:00 ET				Stadium: Pinatar Arena

21 November 2023 Friendly	Ivory Coast	4–0	Iraq	San Pedro del Pinatar, Spain
				Stadium: Pinatar Arena

2024

20 January 2024 Friendly	Egypt	0–1	Iraq	Dubai, UAE
			Halo Fayaq 90+6'

23 January 2024 Friendly	United Arab Emirates	0–4	Iraq	Dubai, UAE
			Abdullah; Muntadher Mohammed; Omar Abdul-Mujbas; Hassan Khalid

27 January 2024 Friendly	Togo	2–3	Iraq	Dubai, UAE
			Josef Al-Imam 39'; Karrar Alaa 68'; Abdullah 90+4'

11 April 2024 Friendly	Japan	1–0	Iraq	Doha, Qatar
				Stadium: Qatar University Stadium

16 April 2024 2024 AFC U-23 Asian Cup	Iraq	0–2	Thailand	Al Wakrah, Qatar
18:30		Report	Waris 26'; Teerasak 65'	Stadium: Al Janoub Stadium; Attendance: 854; Referee: Ahmed Eisa Darwish (United Arab Emirates)

19 April 2024 2024 AFC U-23 Asian Cup	Tajikistan	2–4	Iraq	Al Wakrah, Qatar
21:00	Soirov 45+9' (pen.); Madaminov 90+5'	Report	Mohammed 14'; Jassim 22' (pen.); Khalid 56'; Saad 87'	Stadium: Al Janoub Stadium; Attendance: 4,273; Referee: Shaun Evans (Australia)

22 April 2024 2024 AFC U-23 Asian Cup	Saudi Arabia	1–2	Iraq	Al Rayyan, Qatar
18:30	A. Al-Ghamdi 45+10' (pen.)	Report	Jassim 45+1' (pen.); Saadoon 63'	Stadium: Khalifa International Stadium; Referee: Hiroyuki Kimura (Japan)

26 April 2024 2024 AFC U-23 Asian Cup	Iraq	1–0	Vietnam	Al Wakrah, Qatar
18:30	Jassim 64' (pen.)	Report		Stadium: Al Janoub Stadium; Referee: Ko Hyung-jin (South Korea)

29 April 2024 2024 AFC U-23 Asian Cup	Japan	2–0	Iraq	Al Rayyan, Qatar
20:30	Hosoya 28'; Araki 42'	Report		Stadium: Jassim bin Hamad Stadium; Attendance: 6,405; Referee: Shaun Evans (Australia)

2 May 2024 2024 AFC U-23 Asian Cup	Iraq	2–1	Indonesia	Doha, Qatar
18:30	Tahseen 27'; Jassim 96'	Report	Jenner 19'	Stadium: Abdullah bin Khalifa Stadium; Attendance: 8,090; Referee: Majed Al-Shamrani (Saudi Arabia)

17 July 2024 Friendly	Iraq	1–2	Egypt	Anglet, France
	Tahseen 53'		Adel 30', 65'

24 July 2024 2024 Summer Olympics	Iraq	2–1	Ukraine	Décines-Charpieu, France
19:00	Hussein 57' (pen.); Jassim 75'	Report	Rubchynskyi 53'	Stadium: Stade de Lyon; Attendance: 10,637; Referee: Mahmood Ali Ismail (Sudan)

27 July 2024 2024 Summer Olympics	Argentina	3–1	Iraq	Décines-Charpieu, France
15:00	Almada 14'; Gondou 62'; Fernández 85'	Report	Hussein 45+5'	Stadium: Stade de Lyon; Referee: Espen Eskås (Norway)

30 July 2024 2024 Summer Olympics	Morocco	3–0	Iraq	Nice, France
17:00	Richardson 19'; Rahimi 28'; Ezzalzouli 36'	Report		Stadium: Stade de Nice; Referee: Ramon Abatti (Brazil)

=== 2025 ===
2 August 2025 Friendly	Iraq	1–0	Bahrain	Basra, Iraq
	Nawaf 90'

5 August 2025 Friendly	Iraq	1–1	Bahrain	Basra, Iraq

25 August 2025 Friendly	India	1–2	Iraq	Kuala Lumpur, Malaysia
	Sanan 39'	Report	Younis 36'; Zai 72'	Stadium: UM Arena Stadium

28 August 2025 Friendly	India	1–3	Iraq	Kuala Lumpur, Malaysia
		Report		Stadium: UM Arena Stadium

3 September 2025 2026 AFC U23 Qualifiers	Iraq	8–1	Pakistan	Phnom Penh
	Faisal 32' (pen.); Jasim 47', 66', 72'; Aayed 78', 90+4'; Younis 83'; Sadeq 85'	Report	Abdullah 61'

6 September 2025 2026 AFC U23 Qualifiers	Oman	0–1	Iraq	Phnom Penh

9 September 2025 2026 AFC U23 Qualifiers	Iraq	0–0	Cambodia	Phnom Penh

11 October 2025 Friendly	Tunisia	3–1	Iraq	Sousse, Tunisia
				Stadium: Olympic Stadium

14 October 2025 Friendly	Tunisia	3–0	Iraq	Sousse, Tunisia
				Stadium: Olympic Stadium

4 December 2025 2025 AGCFF U-23 Gulf Cup	Iraq	1–2	Yemen	Al Rayyan
14:45	M. Mousa 45+1'	Report	Abdulnabi 29', 38'	Stadium: Aspire Zone (pitch 2)

7 December 2025 2025 AGCFF U-23 Gulf Cup	Oman	0–2	Iraq	Al Rayyan
15:00		Report	Amoori 50' (pen.); A. Luay 82'	Stadium: Aspire Zone (pitch 2)

10 December 2025 2025 AGCFF U-23 Gulf Cup	Iraq	1–0	United Arab Emirates	Al Rayyan
15:00	Aiad 51'	Report		Stadium: Aspire Zone (pitch 2)

14 December 2025 2025 AGCFF U-23 Gulf Cup	Iraq	1–1 (7–6 p)	Qatar	Al Rayyan
15:00	Amoori 11' (pen.)	Report	Al-Abdulla 83'	Stadium: Aspire Zone (pitch 2)

16 December 2025 2025 AGCFF U-23 Gulf Cup	Saudi Arabia	2–0	Iraq	Doha
17:00	Al-Ghamdi 23'; Al-Aliwa 49'	Report		Stadium: Stadium 974
