= Football at the 2008 Summer Olympics – Men's Asian qualifiers preliminary round 2 =

This page provides the summary of the second round qualifiers for the group stage of the Asian football qualifiers for 2008 Olympics. The matches in this round were held on 28 February 2007 to 6 June 2007.

== Matches ==
=== Group A ===
Team	Pld	W	D	L	GF	GA	GD	Pts	BHR	QAT	KUW	PAK
Bahrain	6	4	0	2	17	11	+6	12		4–2	2–1	8–0
Qatar	6	3	2	1	18	7	+11	11	4–0		2–2	7–0
Kuwait	6	3	2	1	14	5	+9	11	3–0	1–1		4–0
Pakistan	6	0	0	6	1	27	−26	0	1–3	0–2	0–3	

28 February 2007
19:00 UTC+03:00

Bahrain	8–0	Pakistan
Al-Dakeel 20', 24'; Abbas Ayyad 33'; Ismaeel Hasan 42'; Fatadi 54', 89'; Okwunwanne 74'; Aaish 86' (pen.)	Report

Bahrain National Stadium, Isa Town
Attendance: 2,000
Referee: Hedayat Mombini (Iran)
28 February 2007
18:00 UTC+03:00

Qatar	2–2	Kuwait
Siddiq 49'; Adel Mohd 65'	Report	Al-Marzouq 70' (pen.); Al-Enezi 82'

Jassim Bin Hamad Stadium, Doha
Attendance: 1,500
Referee: Talaat Najm (Lebanon)

14 March 2007
19:00 UTC+05:00

Pakistan	0–2	Qatar
	Report	Jassem 75' (pen.); Adel Mohd 90+4'

Jinnah Sports Stadium, Islamabad
Attendance: 2,000
Referee: Yang Zhiqiang (China)
14 March 2007
18:25 UTC+03:00

Kuwait	3–0	Bahrain
Al-Enezi 12', 79', 90+3'	Report

Al-Sadaqua Walsalam Stadium, Kuwait City
Attendance: 3,500
Referee: Abdullah Mohamed Al Hilali (Oman)

28 March 2007
19:00 UTC+05:00

Pakistan	0–3	Kuwait
	Report	Fahad Shaheen 31'; Al-Enezi 40'; Bader Al-Mutawa 90+3'

Punjab Stadium, Lahore
Attendance: 2,000
Referee: Kim Dong-Jin (Korea Republic)
28 March 2007
19:00 UTC+03:00

Bahrain	4–2	Qatar
Aaish 4'; Ismaeel Hasan 11'; Adbulla Omar 57'; Okwunwanne 88'	Report	Adel Mohd 46'; Siddiq 64'

Bahrain National Stadium, Isa Town
Attendance: 4,000
Referee: Khalil Al Ghamdi (Saudi Arabia)

18 April 2007
18:45 UTC+03:00

Kuwait	4–0	Pakistan
Al-Enezi 35', 58'; Bader Al-Mutawa 53', 71'	Report

Al-Sadaqua Walsalam Stadium, Kuwait City
Attendance: 6,000
Referee: Abdulrahman Racho (Syria)
18 April 2007
18:30 UTC+03:00

Qatar	4–0	Bahrain
Afif 5'; Bilal Mohammed 45'; Siddiq 81'; Magid Mohamed 83'	Report

Jassim Bin Hamad Stadium, Doha
Attendance: 10,000
Referee: Salem Mujghef (Jordan)

16 May 2007
19:00 UTC+05:00

Pakistan	1–3	Bahrain
Al-Berri 20' (o.g.)	Report	Ismaeel Hasan 40', 55'; Al Ajmi 45+2'

Punjab Stadium, Lahore
Attendance: 4,000
Referee: Ali Saleem (Maldives)
16 May 2007
20:30 UTC+03:00

Kuwait	1–1	Qatar

Al-Sadaqua Walsalam Stadium, Kuwait City

6 June 2007
19:15 UTC+03:00

Bahrain	2–1	Kuwait
Fatadi 24'; Okwunwanne 90'	Report	Al-Enezi 57' (pen.)

Bahrain National Stadium, Isa Town
Attendance: 14,000
Referee: Hiroyoshi Takayama (Japan)
6 June 2007
19:15 UTC+03:00

Qatar	7–0	Pakistan
Magid Mohamed 38'; Yusef Ali 40', 63'; Afif 44'; Adel Mohd 45'; Al-Bloushi 70'; Jassem 74'	Report

Al-Gharafa Stadium, Doha
Attendance: 2,000
Referee: Mohsen Torky (Iran)

=== Group B ===
Team	Pld	W	D	L	GF	GA	GD	Pts	JPN	SYR	MAS	HKG
Japan	6	6	0	0	17	2	+15	18		3–0	3–1	3–0
Syria	6	3	1	2	9	7	+2	10	0–2		3–1	4–1
Malaysia	6	1	1	4	4	9	−5	4	1–2	0–0		0–1
Hong Kong	6	1	0	5	2	14	−12	3	0–4	0–2	0–1	

28 February 2007
19:20 UTC+09:00

Japan	3–0	Hong Kong
Hirayama 11'; Kajiyama 66'; Masuda 83'	Report

National Stadium, Tokyo
Attendance: 11,909
Referee: Sun Baojie (China)
28 February 2007
14:00 UTC+02:00

Syria	3–1	Malaysia
Ibrahim 43', 52', 60'	Report	Abd Hamid 65'

Abbasiyyin Stadium, Damascus
Attendance: 5,000
Referee: Masoud Moradi (Iran)

14 March 2007
19:30 UTC+08:00

Hong Kong	0–2	Syria
	Report	Al Haj 74'; Khaddoj 84'

Hong Kong Stadium, Hong Kong
Attendance: 2,000
Referee: Benjamin Williams (Australia)
14 March 2007
20:45 UTC+08:00

Malaysia	1–2	Japan
Zambri 82'	Report	Hirayama 13'; Lee 75'

MPPJ Stadium, Petaling Jaya
Attendance: 4,500
Referee: Ali Al Mutlaq (Saudi Arabia)

28 March 2007
19:30 UTC+08:00

Hong Kong	0–1	Malaysia
	Report	Zainal 25'

Mongkok Stadium, Hong Kong
Attendance: 1,000
Referee: Chaiwat Kunsuta (Thailand)
28 March 2007
19:10 UTC+09:00

Japan	3–0	Syria
Ienaga 16'; Hirayama 24', 71'	Report

National Stadium, Tokyo
Attendance: 18,495
Referee: Lee Gi-young (Korea Republic)

18 April 2007
20:45 UTC+08:00

Malaysia	0–1	Hong Kong
	Report	Yip Chi Ho 2'

MPPJ Stadium, Petaling Jaya
Attendance: 2,500
Referee: Abdulhameed Ebrahim (Bahrain)
18 April 2007
15:00 UTC+02:00

Syria	0–2	Japan
	Report	Mizuno 17'; K. Honda 43'

Abbasiyyin Stadium, Damascus
Attendance: 3,000
Referee: Shamsul Maidin (Singapore)

16 May 2007
20:10 UTC+08:00

Hong Kong	0–4	Japan
	Report	Lee 7'; Hirayama 45+2'; K. Honda 52'; Mizuno 60'

Hong Kong Stadium, Hong Kong
Attendance: 4,246
Referee: Mohamad Mansour (Lebanon)
16 May 2007
20:45 UTC+08:00

Malaysia	0–0	Syria
	Report

MPPJ Stadium, Petaling Jaya
Attendance: 3,000
Referee: Sun Baojie (China)

6 June 2007
19:10 UTC+09:00

Japan	3–1	Malaysia
Nagatomo 28'; Suzuki 33'; Bandai 52' (pen.)	Report	Subramaniam 59'

National Stadium, Tokyo
Attendance: 18,020
Referee: Mark Shield (Australia)
6 June 2007
17:00 UTC+02:00

Syria	4–1	Hong Kong
Al Haj 10', 67'; Kailouni 87'; Habib 90+2'	Report	Yip Chi Ho 47'

Abbasiyyin Stadium, Damascus
Attendance: 500
Referee: Dilovar Orzuev (Tajikistan)

=== Group C ===
Team	Pld	W	D	L	GF	GA	GD	Pts	Qualification	VIE	LIB	OMA	IDN
Vietnam	6	4	0	2	8	5	+3	12	Advance to the third round		2–0	2–0	2–1
Lebanon	5	4	0	1	6	4	+2	12	Advance to the third round	1–0		1–0	2–1
Oman	5	2	0	3	7	6	+1	6		3–1	Canc...		3–0
Indonesia	6	1	0	5	5	11	−6	3		0–1	1–2	2–1	

28 February 2007
19:00 UTC+04:00

Oman	3–0	Indonesia
A. Al-Mahaijri 33'; Hassan Zaher 74'; Al-Ghailani 87'	Report

Sultan Qaboos Sports Complex, Muscat
Attendance: 2,000
Referee: Fareed Ali Mohamed Al Marzouqi (United Arab Emirates)
28 February 2007
17:00 UTC+07:00

Vietnam	2–0	Lebanon
Lê Công Vinh 34'; Huỳnh Phúc Hiệp 90+2'	Report

Thiên Truong Stadium, Nam Định
Attendance: 12,000
Referee: Rosdi Shaharul (Malaysia)

14 March 2007
20:00 UTC+07:00

Indonesia	0–1	Vietnam
	Report	Công Vinh 76'

Mattoangin Stadium, Makassar
Attendance: 13,000
Referee: Dilovar Orzuev (Tajikistan)
14 March 2007
18:00 UTC+03:00

Lebanon	1–0	Oman
Salameh 85'	Report

Beirut Municipal Stadium, Beirut
Attendance: 100
Referee: Matthew Breeze (Australia)

28 March 2007
19:00 UTC+07:00

Indonesia	1–2	Lebanon
Mulyana 60'	Report	Maatouk 23'; Amine 62'

Lebak Bulus Stadium, Jakarta
Attendance: 5,200
Referee: Ram Krishna Gosh (Bangladesh)
28 March 2007
19:15 UTC+04:00

Oman	3–1	Vietnam
Zaher 48'; Y.Al-Mahaijri 50'; Al Abdul Salem 84'	Report	Phan Thanh Bình 89'

Sultan Qaboos Sports Complex, Muscat
Attendance: 1,000
Referee: Subrata Sarkar (India)

18 April 2007
18:00 UTC+03:00

Lebanon	2–1	Indonesia
El Ali 4', 38'	Report	Sucipto 83'

Beirut Municipal Stadium, Beirut
Attendance: 0
Referee: Satop Tongkhan (Thailand)
18 April 2007
17:00 UTC+07:00

Vietnam	2–0	Oman
Nguyễn Vũ Phong 2'; Nguyễn Minh Chuyên 31'	Report

Mỹ Đình National Stadium, Hanoi
Attendance: 20,000
Referee: Junjie Huang (China)

16 May 2007
19:00 UTC+07:00

Indonesia	2–1	Oman
Solossa 60'; Bustomi 75'	Report	Al Mukhaini 68'

Lebak Bulus Stadium, Jakarta
Attendance: 5,000
Referee: Jong Chul Kwon (Korea Republic)
16 May 2007
18:00 UTC+03:00

Lebanon	1–0	Vietnam
Moghrabi 5'	Report

Beirut Municipal Stadium, Beirut
Attendance: 100
Referee: Rustam Saidov (Uzbekistan)

6 June 2007
17:30 UTC+04:00

Oman	Cancelled	Lebanon
	Report

Sultan Qaboos Sports Complex, Muscat
Referee: Naser Al-Ghafary (Jordan)

The match was cancelled because of the Cyclone Gonu

6 June 2007
20:30 UTC+07:00

Vietnam	2–1	Indonesia
Nguyễn Vũ Phong 7', 90+3'	Report	Jufriyanto 89'

Mỹ Đình National Stadium, Hanoi
Attendance: 35,000
Referee: Benjamin Williams (Australia)

=== Group D ===
Team	Pld	W	D	L	GF	GA	GD	Pts	KSA	AUS	IRN	JOR
Saudi Arabia	6	5	0	1	11	6	+5	15		2–1	1–0	4–1
Australia	6	3	2	1	11	4	+7	11	2–0		3–1	1–1
Iran	6	1	2	3	6	7	−1	5	2–3	0–0		0–0
Jordan	6	0	2	4	2	13	−11	2	0–1	0–4	0–3	

28 February 2007
15:00 UTC+03:30

Iran	0–0	Australia
	Report

Azadi Stadium, Tehran
Attendance: 4,000
Referee: Abdullah Balideh (Qatar)
28 February 2007
18:00 UTC+02:00

Jordan	0–1	Saudi Arabia
	Report	Al-Ghwainim 27'

Amman International Stadium, Amman
Attendance: 2,000
Referee: Yuichi Nishimura (Japan)

14 March 2007
19:00 UTC+10:30

Australia	1–1	Jordan
Sarkies 58'	Report	Abdel-Halim 86'

Hindmarsh Stadium, Adelaide
Attendance: 1,296
Referee: Chaiwat Kunsuta (Thailand)
14 March 2007
20:30 UTC+03:00

Saudi Arabia	1–0	Iran
Al-Salem 83'	Report

Prince Mohamed bin Fahd Stadium, Dammam
Attendance: 8,000
Referee: Jong Chul Kwon (Korea Republic)

28 March 2007
19:00 UTC+10:30

Australia	2–0	Saudi Arabia
Topor-Stanley 73'; Sarkies 90+3'	Report

Hindmarsh Stadium, Adelaide
Attendance: 3,434
Referee: Malik Abdul Bashir (Singapore)
28 March 2007
17:00 UTC+03:30

Iran	0–0	Jordan
	Report

Azadi Stadium, Tehran
Attendance: 15,000
Referee: Mahmood Mohd Juma Al Ghatrifi (Oman)

18 April 2007
20:30 UTC+03:00

Saudi Arabia	2–1	Australia
Al-Bishi 60' (pen.); Al-Salem 67'	Report	Bridge 45+2'

Prince Mohamed bin Fahd Stadium, Dammam
Attendance: 11,000
Referee: Ravshan Irmatov (Uzbekistan)
18 April 2007
18:00 UTC+02:00

Jordan	0–3	Iran
	Report	Kaebi 37'; Amraei 81'; Oladi 86'

Amman International Stadium, Amman
Attendance: 500
Referee: Ala Abdul Kadir Nema (Iraq)

16 May 2007
19:00 UTC+09:30

Australia	3–1	Iran
Downes 3'; Bridge 42' (pen.); Troisi 52'	Report	Amraei 4'

Hindmarsh Stadium, Adelaide
Attendance: 6,750
Referee: Saad Kamil Al-Fadhli (Kuwait)
16 May 2007
20:45 UTC+03:00

Saudi Arabia	4–1	Jordan
Al-Bishi 14'; Al-Sahlawi 37', 55'; Al-Salem 43'	Report	Al-Sabah 60'

Prince Mohamed bin Fahd Stadium, Dammam
Attendance: 15,000
Referee: Fareed Ali Mohamed Al Marzouqi (United Arab Emirates)

6 June 2007
19:00 UTC+03:30

Iran	2–3	Saudi Arabia
Kolahkaj 74'; Goudarzi 75'	Report	Al-Hawsawi 26'; Naif Hazazi 72'; Al-Ghanam 84'

Azadi Stadium, Tehran
Attendance: 2,100
Referee: Kazuhiko Matsumura (Japan)
6 June 2007
18:30 UTC+02:00

Jordan	0–4	Australia
	Report	Williams 54', 73'; Ward 66'; Vidošić 90+2'

King Abdullah Stadium, Amman
Attendance: 100
Referee: Jasim Karim (Bahrain)

=== Group E ===
Team	Pld	W	D	L	GF	GA	GD	Pts	IRQ	PRK	THA	IND
Iraq	6	3	3	0	9	4	+5	12		0–0	1–1	3–0
North Korea	6	3	2	1	7	4	+3	11	2–2		0–0	2–1
Thailand	6	1	2	3	3	6	−3	5	0–1	0–1		2–0
India	6	1	1	4	5	10	−5	4	1–1	0–2	0–1	

28 February 2007
15:00 UTC+03:00

Iraq	3–0	India
Mustafa 51'; Abdul-Zahra 65'; Aboodi 70'	Report

King Abdullah Stadium, Amman (Jordan) (Note: Iraq had to play their remaining home games of the 2008 Summer Olympics qualifiers at a neutral venue)
Attendance: 1,500
Referee: Atallah Jatli Al-Enezi (Kuwait)
28 February 2007
19:00 UTC+07:00

Thailand	0–1	North Korea
	Report	An Chol-Hyok 21'

Suphachalasai Stadium, Bangkok
Attendance: 10,000
Referee: Mohamed Al Saeedi (United Arab Emirates)

14 March 2007
18:00 UTC+05:30

India	3–0	Thailand
	Report	Teeratep 9'

Jawaharlal Nehru Stadium, Delhi
Attendance: 3,000
Referee: Ali Saleem (Maldives)

India was awarded a win after Thailand used a suspended player.

14 March 2007
15:00 UTC+09:00

North Korea	2–2	Iraq
An Chol-Hyok 44'; Kim Kwang-Hyok 69'	Report	Abdul-Zahra 32'; Rehema 90'

Kim Il-sung Stadium, Pyongyang
Attendance: 58,000
Referee: Hasan Tayeb Shamsuzzaman (Bangladesh)

28 March 2007
18:00 UTC+05:30

India	0–2	North Korea
	Report	Pak Nam-Chol 58'; Jong Su-Hyok 78'

Jawaharlal Nehru Stadium, Delhi
Attendance: 3,000
Referee: Kadyrbek Chynybekov (Kyrgyzstan)
28 March 2007
17:00 UTC+03:00

Iraq	1–1	Thailand
Saeed 22'	Report	Teeratep 49'

Prince Mohammad International Stadium, Zarqa (Jordan)
Attendance: 3,000
Referee: Mukhtar Al-Yarimi (Yemen)

18 April 2007
16:00 UTC+09:00

North Korea	2–1	India
An Chol-Hyok 16', 21'	Report	Lamare 66'

Kim Il-sung Stadium, Pyongyang
Attendance: 49,000
Referee: Sun Baojie (China PR)
18 April 2007
19:00 UTC+07:00

Thailand	0–1	Iraq
	Report	Karrar 90+2'

Thai Army Sports Stadium, Bangkok
Attendance: 3,200
Referee: Hiroyoshi Takayama (Japan)

16 May 2007
18:00 UTC+05:30

India	1–1	Iraq
Saikh 72'	Report	Karrar 54'

Jawaharlal Nehru Stadium, Delhi
Attendance: 5,000
Referee: Muhsen Basma (Syria)
16 May 2007
16:00 UTC+09:00

North Korea	0–0	Thailand
	Report

Kim Il-sung Stadium, Pyongyang
Attendance: 30,000
Referee: Abdulrahman Abdou (Qatar)

6 June 2007
21:00 UTC+03:00

Iraq	1–0	North Korea
Karrar 63'	Report

King Abdullah Stadium, Amman (Jordan)
Attendance: 5,000
Referee: Ravshan Irmatov (Uzbekistan)
6 June 2007
16:00 UTC+07:00

Thailand	2–0	India
Apipoo 27'; Teerasil 90'	Report

Rajamangala Stadium, Bangkok
Attendance: 1,000
Referee: Võ Minh Trí (Vietnam)

=== Group F ===
Team	Pld	W	D	L	GF	GA	GD	Pts	KOR	UZB	UAE	YEM
South Korea	6	5	0	1	10	3	+7	15		2–0	3–1	1–0
Uzbekistan	6	4	0	2	8	4	+4	12	0–1		2–1	3–0
United Arab Emirates	6	2	0	4	7	11	−4	6	1–3	0–2		2–0
Yemen	6	1	0	5	2	9	−7	3	1–0	0–1	1–2	

28 February 2007
20:00 UTC+09:00

South Korea	1–0	Yemen
Yang Dong-Hyun 63'	Report

Suwon World Cup Stadium, Suwon
Attendance: 11,672
Referee: Tan Hai (China PR)
28 February 2007
16:00 UTC+05:00

Uzbekistan	2–1	United Arab Emirates
Kuziboyev 16'; Bikmaev 42'	Report	Khamis 38'

Pakhtakor Markaziy Stadium, Tashkent
Attendance: 3,500
Referee: Matthew Breeze (Australia)

14 March 2007
16:00 UTC+03:00

Yemen	0–1	Uzbekistan
	Report	Haydarov 46'

Althawra Sports City Stadium, Sana'a
Attendance: 10,000
Referee: Kadhum Auda Lazim (Iraq)
14 March 2007
19:00 UTC+04:00

United Arab Emirates	1–3	South Korea
Al-Marzooqi 50'	Report	Han Dong-Won 22', 80'; Lee Sung-Hyun 36'

Al-Nahyan Stadium, Abu Dhabi
Attendance: 2,000
Referee: Kazuhiko Matsumura (Japan)

28 March 2007
16:00 UTC+03:00

Yemen	1–2	United Arab Emirates
Farid 82'	Report	Khamis 73'; Al Shehhi 90+2'

Ali Muhesen Stadium, Sana'a
Attendance: 8,000
Referee: Abdulhameed Ebrahim (Bahrain)
28 March 2007
20:00 UTC+09:00

South Korea	2–0	Uzbekistan
Han Dong-Won 34', 85'	Report

Ansan Wa~ Stadium, Ansan
Attendance: 30,000
Referee: Talaat Najm (Lebanon)

18 April 2007
19:30 UTC+04:00

United Arab Emirates	2–0	Yemen
Farid 48' (o.g.); Mubarak 55'	Report

Sharjah Stadium, Sharjah
Attendance: 1,000
Referee: Mohamad Mansour (Lebanon)
18 April 2007
17:00 UTC+05:00

Uzbekistan	0–1	South Korea
	Report	Baek Ji-Hoon 75'

Pakhtakor Markaziy Stadium, Tashkent
Attendance: 6,000
Referee: Khalil Al Ghamdi (Saudi Arabia)

16 May 2007
16:00 UTC+03:00

Yemen	1–0	South Korea
Mohammed 4'	Report

Ali Muhesen Stadium, Sana'a
Attendance: 4,000
Referee: Ram Krishna Gosh (Bangladesh)
16 May 2007
17:00 UTC+04:00

United Arab Emirates	0–2	Uzbekistan
	Report	Salomov 37'; Tojiyev 49'

Al-Rashid Stadium, Dubai
Attendance: 2,300
Referee: Masoud Moradi (Iran

6 June 2007
20:15 UTC+09:00

South Korea	3–1	United Arab Emirates
Lee Keun-Ho 33', 49'; Kim Chang-Soo 82'	Report	Al-Junaibi 72'

Daejeon World Cup Stadium, Daejeon
Attendance: 30,510
Referee: Subkhiddin Mohd Salleh (Malaysia)
6 June 2007
16:15 UTC+05:00

Uzbekistan	3–0	Yemen
Ibrahimov 56'; Haydarov 64'; Umirzakov 81'	Report

Dynamo Samarkand Stadium, Samarqand
Attendance: 12,000
Referee: Abdulla Mohamed Balideh (Qatar)
