= 2006–07 in Australian soccer =

Soccer in Australia
- Season: 2006–07

Men's soccer
- A-League Championship: Melbourne Victory
- A-League Premiership: Melbourne Victory
- A-League Pre-Season Challenge Cup: Adelaide United

The 2006–07 season was the 38th season of national competitive soccer in Australia and 124th overall.

== A-League ==
The 2006–07 A-League season began on 25 August 2006 and ended on 18 February 2007.

=== Regular season ===
Pos	Team	Pld	W	D	L	GF	GA	GD	Pts	Qualification
1	Melbourne Victory (C)	21	14	3	4	41	20	+21	45	Qualification for 2008 AFC Champions League group stage and Finals series
2	Adelaide United	21	10	3	8	32	27	+5	33	Qualification for 2008 AFC Champions League group stage and Finals series
3	Newcastle Jets	21	8	6	7	32	30	+2	30	Qualification for Finals series
4	Sydney FC	21	8	8	5	29	19	+10	29 (Note: Sydney FC were penalised three competition points following round 18 due to salary cap breaches which occurred during the 2005–06 season)	Qualification for Finals series
5	Queensland Roar	21	8	5	8	25	27	−2	29	
6	Central Coast Mariners	21	6	6	9	22	26	−4	24	
7	Perth Glory	21	5	5	11	24	30	−6	20	
8	New Zealand Knights (Note: New Zealand Knights cannot qualify for the AFC Champions League as they are not recognised as an AFC club.)	21	5	4	12	13	39	−26	19	Disbanded at end of season

Source: ultimatealeague.com
Rules for classification: 1) points; 2) goal difference; 3) number of goals scored.
(C) Champions

=== Finals ===
Semifinals
2	Adelaide United	0	1	1
1	Melbourne Victory	0	2	2
4	Sydney FC	2	0	2
3	Newcastle Jets	1	2	3

Preliminary final
2	Adelaide United (p)	1 (4)
3	Newcastle Jets	1 (3)

Final
1	Melbourne Victory	6
2	Adelaide United	0

== A-League Pre-Season Challenge Cup ==
The 2006 A-League Pre-Season Challenge Cup began on 15 July 2006 and ended on 19 August 2006

=== Group stage ===
Group A

Pos	Team	Pld	W	D	L	GF	GA	BP	Pts	Qualification
1	Central Coast Mariners	4	2	2	0	5	2	0	8	Advance to semi-finals
2	Adelaide United	4	2	2	0	2	0	0	8	Advance to semi-finals
3	Melbourne Victory FC	4	1	1	2	5	7	2	6	
4	Perth Glory	4	0	2	2	3	6	0	2	

Group B

Pos	Team	Pld	W	D	L	GF	GA	BP	Pts	Qualification
1	Sydney FC	4	3	1	0	7	2	2	12	Advance to semi-finals
2	Newcastle Jets FC	4	0	2	2	4	6	1	3	Advance to semi-finals
3	New Zealand Knights	4	0	3	1	2	3	0	3	
4	Queensland Roar	4	0	3	1	2	3	0	3	

Head-to-head results: Queensland Roar 1–1 New Zealand Knights (tied on head-to-head results, ranked on disciplinary record).

=== Finals ===
Playoffs
A1	Central Coast Mariners	2
B2	Newcastle Jets FC	1
A2	Adelaide United	2
B1	Sydney FC	1
A3	Melbourne Victory FC (pen.)	0 (4)
B4	Queensland Roar	0 (2)
A4	New Zealand Knights	0
B3	Perth Glory	1

Finals
Grand final
Central Coast Mariners	1 (4)
Adelaide United (pen.)	1 (5)
Third place
Sydney FC	2
Newcastle Jets FC	0
Fifth place
Melbourne Victory FC	1
Perth Glory	0
Seventh place
New Zealand Knights	1
Queensland Roar	2

== Asian Champions League ==
The 2006 AFC Champions League began on 7 March 2007 and ended on 14 November 2007. Adelaide United and Sydney FC represented Australia in the competition, 2005–06 A-League Premiers and Champions, respectively.

=== Adelaide United ===
7 March 2007 Group stage	Adelaide United (Australia)	0–1	(China) Shandong Luneng Taishan	Adelaide, Australia
		Report	Valkanis 47' (o.g.)	Stadium: Hindmarsh Stadium; Attendance: 7,645; Referee: Satop Tongkhan (Thailand)

21 March 2007 Group stage	Gach Dong Tam Long An (Vietnam)	0–2	(Australia) Adelaide United	Tân An, Vietnam
		Report	Fernando 18'; Dodd 30'	Stadium: Long An Stadium; Attendance: 10,000; Referee: Ali Saleem (Maldives)

11 April 2007 Group stage	Adelaide United (Australia)	2–2	(South Korea) Seongnam Ilhwa Chunma	Adelaide, Australia
	Fernando 48'; Djite 55'	Report	Kim 57'; Mota 75'	Stadium: Hindmarsh Stadium; Attendance: 9,093; Referee: Subkhiddin Mohd Salleh (Malaysia)

25 April 2007 Group stage	Seongnam Ilhwa Chunma (South Korea)	1–0	(Australia) Adelaide United	Seongnam, South Korea
	Sung-Kuk 29'	Report		Stadium: Seongnam 2 Stadium; Attendance: 2,000; Referee: Muhsen Basma (Syria)

9 May 2007 Group stage	Shandong Luneng Taishan (China)	2–2	(Australia) Adelaide United	Jinan, China
	Li 39'; Chang 56'	Report	Fernando 36' (pen.); Burns 48'	Stadium: Shandong Stadium; Attendance: 30,000; Referee: Khalil Al Ghamdi (Saudi Arabia)

23 May 2007 Group stage	Adelaide United (Australia)	3–0	(Vietnam) Gach Dong Tam Long An	Adelaide, Australia
	Dodd 7', 22', 49'	Report		Stadium: Hindmarsh Stadium; Attendance: 6,917; Referee: Abdul Bashir (Singapore)

=== Sydney FC ===
7 March 2007 Group stage	Shanghai Shenhua (China)	1–2	(Australia) Sydney FC	Shanghai, China
	Xie Hui 78'	Report	Steve Corica 8'; Ufuk Talay 23'	Stadium: Yuanshen Stadium; Attendance: 12,000; Referee: Lee Gi-Young (South Korea)

21 March 2007 Group stage	Sydney FC (Australia)	2–2	(Japan) Urawa Red Diamonds	Sydney, Australia
	David Carney 1'; Ufuk Talay 23' (pen.)	Report	Robson Ponte 30'; Yuichiro Nagai 55'	Stadium: Aussie Stadium; Attendance: 21,010; Referee: Subkhiddin Mohd Salleh (Malaysia)

12 April 2007 Group stage	Persik Kediri (Indonesia)	2–1	(Australia) Sydney FC	Surakarta, Indonesia
	Aris Budi Prasetyo 25'; Budi Sudarsono 70'	Report	Steve Corica 8'	Stadium: Manahan Stadium; Attendance: 15,000; Referee: Abdullah Balideh (Qatar)

25 April 2007 Group stage	Sydney FC (Australia)	3–0	(Indonesia) Persik Kediri	Sydney, Australia
	Steve Corica 54', 90'; Alex Brosque 73'	Report		Stadium: Parramatta Stadium; Attendance: 10,075; Referee: Minh Tri Vo (Vietnam)

9 May 2007 Group stage	Sydney FC (Australia)	0–0	(China) Shanghai Shenhua	Sydney, Australia
		(Report 1 2)		Stadium: Aussie Stadium; Attendance: 14,786; Referee: Abdul Bashir (Singapore)

23 May 2007 Group stage	Urawa Red Diamonds (Japan)	0–0	(Australia) Sydney FC	Saitama, Japan
		Report		Stadium: Saitama Stadium; Attendance: 44,793; Referee: Fareed Al-Marzouqi (United Arab Emirates)

== National teams ==
=== Men's senior ===
==== Friendlies ====
The following is a list of friendlies played by the men's senior national team in 2006–07.

7 October 2006	Australia	1–1	Paraguay	Brisbane, Australia
	Popovic 88'	Report	Beauchamp 90+2' (o.g.)	Stadium: Suncorp Stadium; Attendance: 47,609; Referee: Joji Kashihara (Japan)

14 November 2006	Australia	1–1	Ghana	London, England
	Aloisi 25' (pen.)	Report	Agogo 75'	Stadium: Loftus Road; Attendance: 14,379; Referee: Mark Clattenburg (England)

6 February 2007	Australia	1–3	Denmark	London, England
	Emerton 85'	Report	Tomasson 5', 38'; Jensen 28'	Stadium: Loftus Road; Attendance: 12,476; Referee: Rob Styles (England)

24 March 2007	China	0–2	Australia	Guangzhou, China
		Report	Holman 8'; Bresciano 28'	Stadium: Yuexiushan Stadium; Attendance: 20,000; Referee: Wu Chao Jue (Hong Kong)

2 June 2007	Australia	1–2	Uruguay	Sydney, Australia
	Sterjovski 6'	Report	Forlán 40'; Recoba 77'	Stadium: Telstra Stadium; Attendance: 61,795; Referee: Roberto Rosetti (Italy)

30 June 2007	Singapore	0–3	Australia	Kallang, Singapore
		Report	Viduka 55', 88'; Kewell 76'	Stadium: National Stadium; Attendance: 45,000; Referee: Masaaki Toma (Japan)

==== AFC Asian Cup qualification ====
16 August 2006 Qualifying round	Australia	2–0	Kuwait	Sydney, Australia
	Dodd 75'; Petrovski 86'			Stadium: Sydney Football Stadium; Attendance: 32,622; Referee: Junjie Huang (China)

6 September 2006 Qualifying round	Kuwait	2–0	Australia	Kuwait City, Kuwait
	Al Mutairi 55'; Al-Mutwa 60'			Stadium: National Stadium; Attendance: 8,000; Referee: Toru Kamikawa (Japan)

11 October 2006 Qualifying round	Australia	2–0	Bahrain	Sydney, Australia
	Aloisi 17'; Bresciano 23'	Report		Stadium: Sydney Football Stadium; Attendance: 37,000; Referee: Fareed Ali Mohamed Al Marzouqi (United Arab Emirates)

=== Men's under-23 ===
==== Friendlies ====
The following is a list of friendlies played by the men's senior national team in 2006–07.

18 February 2007 Lunar New Year Cup semifinal	China	2–0	Australia	Hong Kong
	Cornthwaite 7' (o.g.); Jiang 87'	Report		Stadium: Hong Kong Stadium; Attendance: 14,633

==== Olympic qualification ====
7 February 2007 Preliminary Round 1	Australia	11–0	Chinese Taipei	Adelaide, Australia
19:00 UTC+09:30	Milligan 4'; Burns 10'; Sarkies 45', 63', 84', 89'; Djite 48'; Stanley 62', 78'; Cornthwaite 81'; Vidošić 90'	Report		Stadium: Hindmarsh Stadium; Attendance: 1,459; Referee: Yuichi Nishimura (Japan)

14 February 2007 Preliminary Round 1	Chinese Taipei	0–1 (0–12 agg.)	Australia	Taipei
18:00 UTC+08:00		Report	Milligan 66'	Stadium: Zhongshan Soccer Stadium; Attendance: 2,500; Referee: Rosdi Shaharul (Malaysia)

28 February 2007 Preliminary Round 2	Iran	0–0	Australia	Tehran, Iran
15:00 UTC+03:30		Report		Stadium: Azadi Stadium; Attendance: 4,000; Referee: Abdullah Balideh (Qatar)

14 March 2007 Preliminary Round 2	Australia	1–1	Jordan	Adelaide, Australia
19:00 UTC+10:30	Sarkies 58'	Report	Abdel-Halim 86'	Stadium: Hindmarsh Stadium; Attendance: 1,296; Referee: Chaiwat Kunsuta (Thailand)

28 March 2007 Preliminary Round 2	Australia	2–0	Saudi Arabia	Adelaide, Australia
19:00 UTC+10:30	Topor-Stanley 73'; Sarkies 90+3'	Report		Stadium: Hindmarsh Stadium; Attendance: 3,434; Referee: Malik Abdul Bashir (Singapore)

18 April 2007 Preliminary Round 2	Saudi Arabia	2–1	Australia	Dammam, Saudi Arabia
20:30 UTC+03:00	Al-Bishi 60' (pen.); Al-Salem 67'	Report	Bridge 45+2'	Stadium: Prince Mohamed bin Fahd Stadium; Attendance: 11,000; Referee: Ravshan Irmatov (Uzbekistan)

16 May 2007 Preliminary Round 2	Australia	3–1	Iran	Adelaide, Australia
19:00 UTC+09:30	Downes 3'; Bridge 42' (pen.); Troisi 52'	Report	Amraei 4'	Stadium: Hindmarsh Stadium; Attendance: 6,750; Referee: Saad Kamil Al-Fadhli (Kuwait)

6 June 2007 Preliminary Round 2	Jordan	0–4	Australia	Amman, Jordan
18:30 UTC+02:00		Report	Williams 54', 73'; Ward 66'; Vidošić 90+2'	Stadium: King Abdullah Stadium; Attendance: 100; Referee: Jasim Karim (Bahrain)

=== Men's under-20 ===
==== Friendlies ====
The following is a list of friendlies played by the men's senior national team in 2006–07.

9 August 2006	Argentina	0–0	Australia	Buenos Aires, Argentina
		Report		Stadium: Estadio Julio Humberto Grondona

12 August 2006	Chile	1–1	Australia	Santiago, Chile
	57'	Report	Djite 71'	Stadium: Estadio Bicentenario de La Florida

14 August 2006	Chile	2–2	Australia	Santiago, Chile
	70'; 87'	Report	Bozanic 25', 32'

17 January 2007 Australian Youth Olympic Festival	Australia	0–1	South Korea	Sydney, Australia
		Report	Yoon Bit-garam 8'

18 January 2007 Australian Youth Olympic Festival	Australia	3–3	Japan	Sydney, Australia
	Ryall 37'; Naidovski 58'; Jesic 90+1'	Report	Marutani 40'; Kiyotake 45+1'; Yamamoto 63'

20 January 2007 Australian Youth Olympic Festival	Australia	1–0	China	Sydney, Australia
	Naidovski 4'	Report

==== AFF U-20 Youth Championship ====
13 September 2006	Thailand	0–3	Australia	Kuantan, Malaysia
		Report	Djite 1'; Downey 79'; Burns 90+2'	Stadium: Darul Makmur Stadium

15 September 2006	Australia	4–0	Vietnam	Kuantan, Malaysia
	Berger 10'; Hearfield 48'; Burns 53'; Elrich 76'	Report		Stadium: Darul Makmur Stadium

17 September 2006	Malaysia	0–1	Australia	Kuantan, Malaysia
		Report	Vidošić 29'	Stadium: Darul Makmur Stadium

==== AFC Youth Championship ====
30 October 2006 Group stage	China	1–0	Australia	Kolkata, India
16:00 IST	Xu 65'			Stadium: Salt Lake Stadium; Attendance: 300; Referee: Qassim Shaban (Kuwait)

1 November 2006 Group stage	Australia	3–1	Thailand	Kolkata, India
16:00 IST	Burns 26' 90+2'; Vidosic 33' (pen.)	Report	Phukom 40' (pen.)	Stadium: Salt Lake Stadium; Attendance: 100; Referee: Mohsen Torky (Iran)

3 November 2006 Group stage	Australia	2–0	United Arab Emirates	Kolkata, India
14:45 IST	Williams 14', 31'	Report		Stadium: Municipal Corporation Stadium; Attendance: 3,000; Referee: Ravshan Irmatov (Uzbekistan)

6 November 2006 Quarterfinal	South Korea	2–1	Australia	Kolkata, India
16:00 IST	Song Jin-hyung 10', 36'	Report	Grossman 18'	Stadium: Salt Lake Stadium; Attendance: 600; Referee: Muhsen Basma (Syria)

=== Women's senior ===
==== Friendlies ====
The following is a list of friendlies played by the women's senior national team in 2006–07.

29 October 2006 Peace Queen Cup group stage	Netherlands	0–1	Australia	Gimhae, South Korea
		Report	Walsh 65'	Stadium: Gimhae Stadium; Attendance: 13,800; Referee: Cha Sung Mi (South Korea)

31 October 2006 Peace Queen Cup group stage	Australia	0–2	United States	Cheonan, South Korea
		Report	Lilly 20'; Kai 35'	Stadium: Cheonan Stadium; Attendance: 8,215; Referee: Kim Eun Jin (South Korea)

2 November 2006 Peace Queen Cup group stage	Australia	1–2	Denmark	Suwon, South Korea
	Munoz 69'	Report	Juliussen 13'; Rasmussen 81'	Stadium: Suwon World Cup Stadium; Attendance: 2,350; Referee: Shin Hwa Yeon (South Korea)

19 November 2006	Japan	1–0	Australia	Tokyo, Japan
	Nagasato 51'	Report		Stadium: Fukuda-Denshi Arena; Attendance: 4,093; Referee: Deng Junxia (China)

==== AFC Women's Asian Cup ====
16 July 2006 Group stage	Australia	4–0	South Korea	Adelaide, Australia
	Shin Sun-Nam 30' (o.g.); Walsh 66'; Munoz 75'; De Vanna 87'	Report		Stadium: Hindmarsh Stadium; Attendance: 3,000; Referee: Bentla D'Coth (India)

18 July 2006 Group stage	Australia	2–0	Myanmar	Adelaide, Australia
	Shipard 31'; De Vanna 77'	Report		Stadium: Hindmarsh Stadium; Attendance: 2,000; Referee: Dongqing Zhang (China)

22 July 2006 Group stage	Australia	0–0	North Korea	Adelaide, Australia
		Report		Stadium: Hindmarsh Stadium; Attendance: 4,000; Referee: Mayumi Oiwa (Japan)

24 July 2006 Group stage	Australia	5–0	Thailand	Adelaide, Australia
	Ferguson 3'; Burgess 27'; Walsh 53'; Gill 62'; De Vanna 81'	Report		Stadium: Hindmarsh Stadium; Attendance: 400; Referee: Hong Eun-Ah (South Korea)

27 July 2006 Semifinal	Australia	2–0	Japan	Adelaide, Australia
	Munoz 10'; Peters 45'	Report		Stadium: Hindmarsh Stadium; Attendance: 4,000; Referee: Jenny Palmqvist (Sweden)

27 July 2006 Final	Australia	2–2 (a.e.t.) (2–4 p)	China	Adelaide, Australia
	Munoz 29'; Peters 33'	Report	Han Duan 68'; Ma Xiaoxu 73'	Stadium: Hindmarsh Stadium; Attendance: 5,000; Referee: Mayumi Oiwa (Japan)
	Penalties
	McCallum (penalty missed); Shipard (penalty scored); Peters (penalty missed); Ferguson (penalty scored)		Ma Xiaoxu (penalty scored); Bi Yan (penalty scored); Li Jie (penalty scored); Han Duan (penalty scored)

==== Olympic qualification ====
21 February 2007 First round	Australia	2–0	Myanmar	Taipei, Taiwan
	Walsh 9', 55'	Report		Stadium: Zhongshan Soccer Stadium; Attendance: 300; Referee: Sachiko Baba (Japan)

23 February 2007 First round	Uzbekistan	0–10	Australia	Taipei, Taiwan
		Report	Gill 3'; Slatyer 14'; Colthorpe 18' 57', 81'; Small 25'; Walsh 27'; Garriock 52'; Davies 57'; Walsh 15'; McCallum 59', 83'; Harch 75'	Stadium: Zhongshan Soccer Stadium; Referee: Etsuko Fukano (Japan)

25 February 2007 First round	Chinese Taipei	1–8	Australia	Taipei, Taiwan
	Pei-Wen Tsai 35'	Report	Gill 14', 26', 44', 49', 90'; Walsh 29'; Peters 72'; Small 83'	Stadium: Zhongshan Soccer Stadium; Attendance: 300; Referee: Bentla D'Coth (India)

7 April 2007 Final round	Australia	15–0	Hong Kong	Coffs Harbour, Australia
	Walsh 10', 12'; McCallum 16', 43', 54'; Gill 26', 52', 72', 74', 89'; Peters 33'; Burgess 56'; Small 72'; Salisbury 85', 87'	Report		Stadium: Coffs Harbour International Stadium; Attendance: 1,511; Referee: Mayumi Oiwa (Japan)

15 April 2007 Final round	Chinese Taipei	0–10	Australia	Taipei, Taiwan
		Report	Gill 6', 28', 29'; Walsh 18', 32', 45'; Peters 42', 57'; Salisbury 81'; Burgess 83'	Stadium: Zhongshan Soccer Stadium; Attendance: 600; Referee: Etsuko Fukano (Japan)

3 June 2007 Final round	North Korea	2–0	Australia	Pyongyang, North Korea
	Ri Kum-suk 35', 55' (pen.)	Report		Stadium: Yanggakdo Stadium; Attendance: 3,100; Referee: Huijin Niu (China)

10 June 2007 Final round	Australia	0–2	North Korea	Coffs Harbour, Australia
		Report	Ri Kum-suk 60'; Kim Kyong-hwa 69'	Stadium: Coffs Harbour International Stadium; Attendance: 2,121; Referee: Sachiko Baba (Japan)

=== Women's under-20 ===
==== FIFA U-20 Women's World Championship ====
17 August 2006 Group stage	New Zealand	0–3	Australia	Saint Petersburg, Russia
		Report	McCallum 39', 80'; Shipard 90+2'	Stadium: Petrovsky Stadium; Attendance: 1,100; Referee: Gyöngyi Gaál (Hungary)

20 August 2006 Group stage	Brazil	2–0	Australia	Saint Petersburg, Russia
	Francielle 41' (pen.); Fabiana 69'	Report		Stadium: Petrovsky Stadium; Attendance: 700; Referee: Jennifer Bennett (United States)

23 August 2006 Group stage	Australia	1–1	Russia	Moscow, Russia
	Brogan 85'	Report	Kozhnikova 75'	Stadium: Torpedo Stadium; Attendance: 1,000; Referee: Christine Baitinger (Germany)

=== Women's under-17 ===
==== Friendlies ====
The following is a list of friendlies played by the women's under-17 national team in 2006–07.

17 January 2007 Australian Youth Olympic Festival	Australia	1–2	South Korea	Sydney, Australia
	Hogben 88'	Report	Ji So-yun 51', 74'	Stadium: Valentine Sports Park

18 January 2007 Australian Youth Olympic Festival	Australia	1–0	Japan	Sydney, Australia
		Report	Simon 68'

20 January 2007 Australian Youth Olympic Festival	Australia	2–1	China	Sydney, Australia
	Kingsley 53'; Butt 73' (pen.)	Report	Zhao 48'

==== AFC U-16 Women's Championship ====
10 March 2007 Group stage	South Korea	3–1	Australia	Petaling Jaya, Malaysia
	Park Hee-young 51'; Kim Jung-in 53'; Lee Hyun-young 58'	Report	Simon 61'	Stadium: Petaling Jaya Stadium; Attendance: 150; Referee: Praew Semaksuk (Thailand)

12 March 2007 Group stage	Australia	0–0	China	Petaling Jaya, Malaysia
		Report		Stadium: Petaling Jaya Stadium; Attendance: 100; Referee: Kim Kyong-hui (North Korea)

== Retirements ==
- 21 November 2006: Geoffrey Claeys, 32, former Belgium and Melbourne Victory defender.
- 16 May 2007: Carl Veart, 36, former Australia, Adelaide City and Adelaide United forward.
- 19 June 2007: John Crawley, 35, former Sydney United and Central Coast Mariners goalkeeper.
- 21 June 2007: Paul Okon, 35, former Australia, Marconi Stallions and Newcastle Jets defender.
