= Kang Min-soo =

South Korean footballer (born 1986)

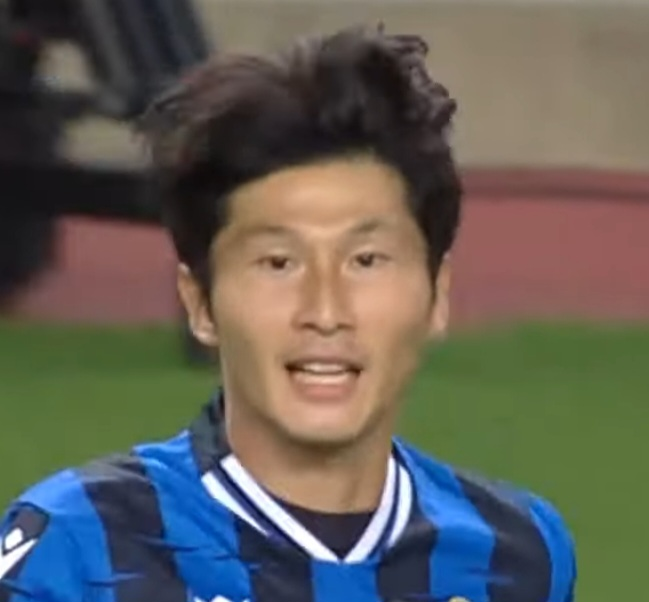

Personal information
- Date of birth: 14 February 1986 (age 40)
- Place of birth: Goyang, Gyeonggi, South Korea
- Height: 1.84 m (6 ft 1/2 in)
- Positions: Center back; full back

Youth career
- 2001–2003: Koyang High School

Senior career*
Years	Team	Apps	(Gls)
2004–2007	Chunnam Dragons	45	(1)
2008	Jeonbuk Hyundai Motors	20	(0)
2009	Jeju United	19	(0)
2010	Suwon Samsung Bluewings	20	(1)
2011–2019	Ulsan Hyundai	204	(10)
2014–2015	→ Sangju Sangmu (army)	46	(1)
2020–2021	Busan IPark	20	(1)
2021–2023	Incheon United	45	(0)

International career^{‡}
2003	South Korea U-20	0	(0)
2006–2008	South Korea U-23	20	(1)
2007–2014	South Korea	33	(0)
- * Club domestic league appearances and goals as of 11 October 2022 ‡ National team caps and goals as of 23 November 2015

- Kang Min-soo
- Hangul: 강민수
- Hanja: 姜敏壽
- RR: Gang Minsu
- MR: Kang Minsu

Kang Min-soo (Korean: 강민수; born 14 February 1986) is a South Korean former football player who plays as a center back. He played for Chunnam Dragons, Jeju United, Jeonbuk Hyundai Motors, Suwon Bluewings and Ulsan Hyundai.

He was a member of South Korea Olympic football team and South Korea national football team.

His first match is 2008 Summer Olympics football qualification second round against Yemen U-23 football team at 28 February 2007. And his international debut match is Friendly match against Netherlands at 2 June 2007.

== Career statistics ==
=== Club ===
Club performance			League		Cup		League Cup		Continental		Total	
Season	Club	League	Apps	Goals	Apps	Goals	Apps	Goals	Apps	Goals	Apps	Goals
South Korea			League		KFA Cup		League Cup		Asia		Total	
2004	Chunnam Dragons	K League 1	0	0	0	0	0	0	-		0	0
2005	Chunnam Dragons	K League 1	10	0	3	0	3	0	-		16	0
2006	Chunnam Dragons	K League 1	18	0	2	0	10	0	-		30	0
2007	Chunnam Dragons	K League 1	17	1	5	0	1	0	4	1	27	2
2008	Jeonbuk Hyundai Motors	K League 1	21	0	2	1	7	0	-		30	1
2009	Jeju United	K League 1	19	0	2	0	3	0	-		24	0
2010	Suwon Samsung Bluewings	K League 1	20	1	2	0	4	1	5	0	31	2
2011	Ulsan Hyundai	K League 1	25	2	4	0	7	0	-		36	2
2012	Ulsan Hyundai	K League 1	31	2	2	0	-		11	1	44	3
2013	Ulsan Hyundai	K League 1	37	2	1	0	-		-		38	2
2014	Ulsan Hyundai	K League 1	11	0	1	1	-		5	1	17	2
2014	Sangju Sangmu	K League 1	19	1	3	0	-		-		22	1
2015	Sangju Sangmu	K League 1	27	0	0	0	-		-		27	0
2016	Ulsan Hyundai	K League 1	26	0	2	0	-		-		28	0
2017	Ulsan Hyundai	K League 1	24	0	4	0	-		2	0	30	0
2018	Ulsan Hyundai	K League 1	30	1	4	0	-		7	0	41	1
2019	Ulsan Hyundai	K League 1	23	3	1	0	-		2	0	26	3
2020	Busan IPark	K League 1	20	1	0	0	-		-		20	1
2021	Busan IPark	K League 2	0	0	0	0	-		-		0	0
2021	Incheon United	K League 1	20	0	0	0	-		-		20	0
2022	Incheon United	K League 1	25	0	0	0	-		-		25	0
Career total			423	14	38	2	35	1	36	3	532	19

=== International ===
National team	Year	Apps	Goals
South Korea U23	2006	1	0
South Korea U23	2007	13	1
South Korea U23	2008	5	0
South Korea U23	Total	19	1
South Korea	2007	8	0
South Korea	2008	12	0
South Korea	2009	7	0
South Korea	2010	4	0
South Korea	2011	0	0
South Korea	Total	31	0

Statistics correct as of matches played 14 February 2010

International appearances and goals
#	Date	Venue	Opponent	Result	Goal	Competition
2006
	14 November	Changwon Civic Stadium, Changwon, South Korea	Japan	1–1	0	Friendly
2007
	28 February	Suwon World Cup Stadium, Suwon, South Korea	Yemen	1–0	0	2008 Summer Olympics Qualifiers 2
	14 March	Al Nahyan Stadium, Abu Dhabi, UAE	United Arab Emirates	3–1	0	2008 Summer Olympics Qualifiers 2
	28 March	Ansan Wa~ Stadium, Ansan, South Korea	Uzbekistan	2–0	0	2008 Summer Olympics Qualifiers 2
	18 April	Pakhtakor Markaziy Stadium, Tashkent, Uzbekistan	Uzbekistan	1–0	0	2008 Summer Olympics Qualifiers 2
	16 May	Ali Mohsen Stadium, Sana'a, Yemen	Yemen	0–1	0	2008 Summer Olympics Qualifiers 2
	16 May	Daejeon World Cup Stadium, Daejeon, South Korea	United Arab Emirates	3–1	0	2008 Summer Olympics Qualifiers 2
1	2 June	Seoul World Cup Stadium, Seoul, South Korea	Netherlands	0–2	0	Friendly
2	5 July	Seoul World Cup Stadium, Seoul, South Korea	Uzbekistan	2–1	0	Friendly
3	11 July	Gelora Bung Karno Stadium, Jakarta, Indonesia	Saudi Arabia	1–1	0	2007 AFC Asian Cup
4	15 July	Gelora Bung Karno Stadium, Jakarta, Indonesia	Bahrain	1–2	0	2007 AFC Asian Cup
5	18 July	Gelora Bung Karno Stadium, Jakarta, Indonesia	Indonesia	1–0	0	2007 AFC Asian Cup
6	22 July	National Stadium, Kuala Lumpur, Malaysia	Iran	0–0 (4–2p)	0	2007 AFC Asian Cup
7	25 July	National Stadium, Kuala Lumpur, Malaysia	Iraq	0–0 (3–4p)	0	2007 AFC Asian Cup
8	28 July	Gelora Sriwijaya Stadium, Palembang, Indonesia	Japan	0–0 (6–5p)	0	2007 AFC Asian Cup
	22 August	Seoul World Cup Stadium, Seoul, South Korea	Uzbekistan	2–1	0	2008 Summer Olympics Qualifiers 3
	3 September	Al-Rashid Stadium, Dubai, UAE	Qatar	0–0	0	Friendly
	8 September	Bahrain National Stadium, Riffa, Bahrain	Bahrain	1–0	1	2008 Summer Olympics Qualifiers 3
	12 September	Seoul World Cup Stadium, Seoul, South Korea	Syria	1–0	0	2008 Summer Olympics Qualifiers 3
	17 October	Abbasiyyin Stadium, Damascus, Syria	Syria	0–0	0	2008 Summer Olympics Qualifiers 3
	17 November	Pakhtakor Markaziy Stadium, Tashkent, Uzbekistan	Uzbekistan	0–0	0	2008 Summer Olympics Qualifiers 3
	21 November	Ansan Wa~ Stadium, Ansan, South Korea	Bahrain	0–0	0	2008 Summer Olympics Qualifiers 3
2008
9	6 February	Seoul World Cup Stadium, Seoul, South Korea	Turkmenistan	4–0	0	2010 FIFA World Cup qualification Round 3
10	20 February	Chongqing Olympic Sports Center, Chongqing, China	North Korea	1–1	0	2008 East Asian Football Championship
11	23 February	Chongqing Olympic Sports Center, Chongqing, China	Japan	1–1	0	2008 East Asian Football Championship
12	26 March	Hongkou Football Stadium, Shanghai, China	North Korea	0–0	0	2010 FIFA World Cup qualification Round 3
13	7 June	King Abdullah Stadium, Amman, Jordan	Jordan	1–0	0	2010 FIFA World Cup qualification Round 3
14	14 June	Ashgabat Olympic Stadium, Ashgabat, Turkmenistan	Turkmenistan	3–1	0	2010 FIFA World Cup qualification Round 3
15	22 June	Seoul World Cup Stadium, Seoul, South Korea	North Korea	0–0	0	2010 FIFA World Cup qualification Round 3
	16 July	Ansan Wa~ Stadium, Ansan, South Korea	Guatemala	2–1	0	Friendly
	27 July	Suwon World Cup Stadium, Suwon, South Korea	Ivory Coast	2–1	0	Friendly
	31 July	Seoul World Cup Stadium, Seoul, South Korea	Australia	1–0	0	Friendly
	7 August	Olympic Sports Center Stadium, Qinhuangdao, China	Cameroon	1–1	0	2008 Summer Olympics
	10 August	Olympic Sports Center Stadium, Qinhuangdao, China	Italy	0–3	0	2008 Summer Olympics
	13 August	Shanghai Stadium, Shanghai, China	Honduras	1–0	0	2008 Summer Olympics
16	5 September	Seoul World Cup Stadium, Seoul, South Korea	Jordan	1–0	0	Friendly
17	10 September	Hongkou Football Stadium, Shanghai, China	North Korea	1–1	0	2010 FIFA World Cup qualification Round 4
18	11 October	Seoul World Cup Stadium, Seoul, South Korea	Uzbekistan	3–0	0	Friendly
19	14 November	Jassim Bin Hamad Stadium, Doha, Qatar	Qatar	1–1	0	Friendly
20	19 November	King Fahd International Stadium, Riyadh, Saudi Arabia	Saudi Arabia	2–0	0	2010 FIFA World Cup qualification Round 4
2009
21	1 February	Al-Maktoum Stadium, Dubai, UAE	Syria	1–1	0	Friendly
22	4 February	Al-Maktoum Stadium, Dubai, UAE	Bahrain	2–2	0	Friendly
23	11 February	Azadi Stadium, Tehran, Iran	Iran	1–1	0	2010 FIFA World Cup qualification Round 4
24	28 March	Suwon World Cup Stadium, Suwon, South Korea	Iraq	2–1	0	Friendly
25	1 April	Seoul World Cup Stadium, Seoul, South Korea	North Korea	1–0	0	2010 FIFA World Cup qualification Round 4
26	12 August	Seoul World Cup Stadium, Seoul, South Korea	Paraguay	1–0	0	Friendly
27	18 November	Craven Cottage, London, England	Serbia	0–1	0	Friendly
2010
28	9 January	Rand Stadium, Johannesburg, South Africa	Zambia	2–4	0	Friendly
29	18 January	Estadio Ciudad de Málaga, Málaga, Spain	Finland	2–0	0	Friendly
30	22 January	Estadio Ciudad de Málaga, Málaga, Spain	Latvia	1–0	0	Friendly
31	14 February	Tokyo National Stadium, Tokyo, Japan	Japan	3–1	0	2010 East Asian Football Championship

== Honours ==
Ulsan Hyundai

- AFC Champions League (1): 2012
