= Football at the 2008 Summer Olympics – Men's Asian qualifiers preliminary round 3 =

This page provides the summaries of the matches of the group stage of the Asian football qualifiers for 2008 Olympics.

== Format ==
The 12 teams in this round were divided into three groups of four teams each and played on a home-and-away format. The group winner from each group advanced to the 2008 Summer Olympics Football tournament in Beijing.

== Matches ==
=== Group A ===
Team	Pld	W	D	L	GF	GA	GD	Pts	AUS	IRQ	PRK	LIB
Australia	6	3	3	0	7	1	+6	12		2–0	1–0	3–0
Iraq	6	3	2	1	12	4	+8	11	0–0		2–0	5–2
North Korea	6	1	2	3	3	6	−3	5	1–1	0–0		0–1
Lebanon	6	1	1	4	4	15	−11	4	0–0	0–5	1–2	

22 August 2007
19:00 UTC+3

Iraq	0–0	Australia

Al-Rayyan Stadium, Al-Rayyan (Qatar) (Note: Iraq had to play their remaining home games of the 2008 Summer Olympics qualifiers at a neutral venue)
Attendance: 1,500
Referee: Sun Baojie (China PR)
23 August 2007
19:00 UTC+9

North Korea	0–1	Lebanon
		Yaacoub 12'

Kim Il-sung Stadium, Pyongyang
Attendance: 35,000
Referee: Satop Tongkhan (Thailand)

8 September 2007
19:00 UTC+10

Australia	1–0	North Korea
Milligan 49'

Energy Australia Stadium, Newcastle
Attendance: 4,903
Referee: Hiroyoshi Takayama (Japan)
8 September 2007
20:45 UTC+3

Lebanon	0–5	Iraq
		Saeed 22'; Abdul-Zahra 59', 89'; Ali Abbas 72'; Karrar Jassim 76'

Beirut Municipal Stadium, Beirut
Attendance: 0
Referee: Mohamed Al Saeedi (United Arab Emirates)

12 September 2007
19:00 UTC+10

Australia	3–0	Lebanon
Ward 6'; Bridge 24'; Williams 90+3'

Bluetongue Central Coast Stadium, Gosford
Attendance: 4,171
Referee: Kadyrbek Chynybekov (Kyrgyzstan)
12 September 2007
20:30 UTC+3

Iraq	2–0	North Korea
Ibrahim 21'; Abdul-Zahra 69'

Al-Rayyan Stadium, Al-Rayyan (Qatar)
Attendance: 1,500
Referee: Abdulrahman Abdou (Qatar)

17 October 2007
18:00 UTC+3

Lebanon	0–0	Australia

Beirut Municipal Stadium, Beirut
Attendance: 350
Referee: Lee Gi-Young (Korea Republic)
17 October 2007
16:00 UTC+9

North Korea	0–0	Iraq

Kim Il-sung Stadium, Pyongyang
Attendance: 17,000
Referee: Hasan Tayeb (Bangladesh)

17 November 2007
19:00 UTC+10

Australia	2–0	Iraq
Leijer 19'; Milligan 58'

Bluetongue Central Coast Stadium, Gosford
Attendance: 13,888
Referee: Malik Abdul Bashir (Singapore)
17 November 2007
18:00 UTC+3

Lebanon	1–2	North Korea
Salameh 5' (pen.)		Kim Kyong-Il 45+1'; Kim Kuk-Jin 70'

Beirut Municipal Stadium, Beirut
Attendance: 200
Referee: Mohsen Torky (Iran)

21 November 2007
16:00 UTC+3

Iraq	5–2	Lebanon
Abdul-Zahra 8', 23', 81'; Mustafa 30'; Samer Saeed 37'		Maatouk 59' (pen.); Al Saadi 72' (pen.)

Al-Rayyan Stadium, Al-Rayyan (Qatar)
Attendance: 100
Referee: Khalil Al Ghamdi (Saudi Arabia)
21 November 2007
15:00 UTC+9

North Korea	1–1	Australia
Pak Chol-Min 10'		Leijer 70'

Kim Il-sung Stadium, Pyongyang
Attendance: 8,500
Referee: Muhsen Basma (Syria)

=== Group B ===
Team	Pld	W	D	L	GF	GA	GD	Pts	KOR	BHR	SYR	UZB
South Korea	6	3	3	0	4	1	+3	12		0–0	1–0	2–1
Bahrain	6	3	2	1	7	4	+3	11	0–1		1–1	2–0
Syria	6	0	4	2	5	7	−2	4	0–0	1–2		3–3
Uzbekistan	6	0	3	3	5	9	−4	3	0–0	1–2	0–0	

22 August 2007
19:00 UTC+9

South Korea	2–1	Uzbekistan
Lee Sang-ho 49'; Lee Keun-Ho 79'		Kim Jin-Kyu 24' (o.g.)

Seoul World Cup Stadium, Seoul
Attendance: 22,885
Referee: Benjamin Williams (Australia)
22 August 2007
19:00 UTC+2

Syria	1–2	Bahrain
Al Hussain 37'		Okwunwanne 45', 90+2'

Hamdanyeh Stadium, Aleppo
Attendance: 3,000

8 September 2007
17:00 UTC+5

Uzbekistan	0–0	Syria

Samarqand Stadium, Samarkand
Attendance: 9,000
Referee: Malik Abdul Bashir (Singapore)
8 September 2007
19:00 UTC+3

Bahrain	0–1	South Korea
		Kang Min-Soo 64'

Bahrain National Stadium, Riffa
Attendance: 3,000
Referee: Mohamad Mansour (Lebanon)

12 September 2007
17:00 UTC+5

Uzbekistan	1–2	Bahrain
Abdullaev 86'		Abdullah Omar 29'; Al Banki 90+2'

Central Army Stadium, Tashkent
Attendance: 12,000
Referee: Satop Tongkhan (Thailand)
12 September 2007
20:00 UTC+9

South Korea	1–0	Syria
Kim Seung-Yong 10'

Seoul World Cup Stadium, Seoul
Attendance: 21,500
Referee: Yang Zhiqiang (China PR)

17 October 2007
18:10 UTC+3

Bahrain	2–0	Uzbekistan
Okwunwanne 45'; Abdullah Omar 55'

Bahrain National Stadium, Riffa
Attendance: 1,000
Referee: Ali Al Mutlaq (Saudi Arabia)
17 October 2007
15:00 UTC+2

Syria	0–0	South Korea

Abbasiyyin Stadium, Damascus
Attendance: 1,500
Referee: Hedayat Mombini (Iran)

17 November 2007
15:00 UTC+5

Uzbekistan	0–0	South Korea

Central Army Stadium, Tashkent
Attendance: 4,000
Referee: Abdulla Mohamed Balideh (Qatar)
17 November 2007
17:50 UTC+3

Bahrain	1–1	Syria
Aaish 63'		Al Haj 42'

Bahrain National Stadium, Riffa
Attendance: 1,500
Referee: Salem Mujghef (Jordan)

21 November 2007
20:00 UTC+9

South Korea	0–0	Bahrain

Ansan Wa~ Stadium, Ansan
Attendance: 28,221
Referee: Subkhiddin Mohd Salleh (Malaysia)
21 November 2007
14:00 UTC+2

Syria	3–3	Uzbekistan
Al Haj 42'; Bakri Tarrab 44'; Dalli Hasan 86'		Tadjiyev 61' (pen.); Galiulin 63', 66'

Abbasiyyin Stadium, Damascus
Attendance: 300
Referee: Hiroyoshi Takayama (Japan)

=== Group C ===
Team	Pld	W	D	L	GF	GA	GD	Pts	Qualification	JPN	QAT	KSA	VIE
Japan	6	3	2	1	7	2	+5	11	Final tournament		1–0	0–0	1–0
Qatar	6	3	1	2	8	6	+2	10		2–1		1–0	3–1
Saudi Arabia	6	2	3	1	5	3	+2	9		0–0	2–1		2–0
Vietnam	6	0	2	4	3	12	−9	2		0–4	1–1	1–1	

22 August 2007
20:30 UTC+9

Japan	1–0	Vietnam
Aoyama 45+1'

National Stadium, Tokyo
Attendance: 22,507
Referee: Ali Al-Badwawi (United Arab Emirates)
22 August 2007
18:45 UTC+3

Qatar	1–0	Saudi Arabia
Al-Hamad 71'

Jassim Bin Hamad Stadium, Doha
Attendance: 3,000
Referee: Muhsen Basma (Syria)

8 September 2007
19:15 UTC+7

Vietnam	1–1	Qatar
Nguyễn Vũ Phong 13'		Al Yazeedi 11'

Mỹ Đình National Stadium, Hanoi
Attendance: 14,000
Referee: Lee Gi-Young (Korea Republic)
8 September 2007
20:30 UTC+3

Saudi Arabia	0–0	Japan

Prince Mohamed bin Fahd Stadium, Dammam
Attendance: 9,000
Referee: Subkhiddin Mohd Salleh (Malaysia)

12 September 2007
19:15 UTC+7

Vietnam	1–1	Saudi Arabia
Lê Công Vinh 65'		Naif Hazazi 80'

Mỹ Đình National Stadium, Hanoi
Attendance: 10,000
Referee: Mohsen Torky (Iran)
12 September 2007
19:20 UTC+9

Japan	1–0	Qatar
Kajiyama 6'

National Stadium, Tokyo
Attendance: 23,163
Referee: Benjamin Williams (Australia)

17 October 2007
20:00 UTC+3

Saudi Arabia	2–0	Vietnam
Al-Salem 64' (pen.), 90+3' (pen.)

Prince Mohamed bin Fahd Stadium, Dammam
Attendance: 4,000
Referee: Sun Baojie (China PR)
17 October 2007
19:00 UTC+3

Qatar	2–1	Japan
Al Haidos 77'; Majdi Siddiq 90+3' (pen.)		Aoyama 43'

Jassim Bin Hamad Stadium, Doha
Attendance: 6,000
Referee: Ravshan Irmatov (Uzbekistan)

17 November 2007
19:15 UTC+7

Vietnam	0–4	Japan
		Lee 9', 25'; Honda 40' (pen.); Hosogai 87'

Mỹ Đình National Stadium, Hanoi
Attendance: 7,000
Referee: Jasim Karim (Bahrain)
17 November 2007
19:45 UTC+3

Saudi Arabia	2–1	Qatar
Al-Bishi 76' (pen.); Al-Ghanam 88'		Magid Mohamed 69'

Prince Mohamed bin Fahd Stadium, Dammam
Attendance: 15,000
Referee: Ali Al-Badwawi (United Arab Emirates)

21 November 2007
19:21 UTC+9

Japan	0–0	Saudi Arabia

National Stadium, Tokyo
Attendance: 42,913
Referee: Kwon Jong-Chul (Korea Republic)
21 November 2007
17:15 UTC+3

Qatar	3–1	Vietnam
Jassem 22', 52'; Al Haidos 31'		Lê Công Vinh 80'

Jassim Bin Hamad Stadium, Doha
Attendance: 5,000
Referee: Mohamad Mansour (Lebanon)
