= Football at the 2008 Summer Olympics – Men's Asian qualifiers preliminary round 1 =

This page provides the summary of the first round qualifiers for the group stage of the Asian football qualifiers for 2008 Olympics. The matches in this round were held on 7 February 2007 (first leg) and 14 February 2007.

== Matches ==
The first legs were played on 7 February and the second legs on 14 February 2007. The aggregate winners advanced to the second round.

Team 1	Agg.	Team 2	1st leg	2nd leg
Myanmar	2–2 (2–5 p)	India	1–1	1–1 (a.e.t.)
Afghanistan	0–2	Vietnam	—^{1}	0–2
Australia	12–0	Chinese Taipei	11–0	1–0
Bangladesh	1–3	Hong Kong	0–3	1–0
Singapore	3–5	Pakistan	1–2	2–3
Uzbekistan	6–1	Tajikistan	4–1	2–0
Palestine	2–3	Yemen	1–2	1–1
Thailand	6–1	Turkmenistan	1–0	5–1
Indonesia	1–0	Maldives	1–0	0–0
Jordan	—	Kyrgyzstan^{2}	—	—

^{1} The first leg of the Vietnam–Afghanistan match in Hanoi was cancelled due to the Afghanistan team's financial problems that led to the team being unable to afford to travel to Vietnam, and security worries. FIFA rescheduled the single-tie match to 14 February 2007.

^{2} Withdrew

=== First leg ===
7 February 2007
17:00 UTC+06:00

Bangladesh	0 – 3	Hong Kong
	Report	Lam Ka Wai 24'; Wu Haopeng 34'; Chan Siu Ki 63'

Bangabandhu National Stadium, Dhaka
Attendance: 6,000
Referee: Abdullah Al Hilali (Oman)

Afghanistan	Cancelled^{1}	Vietnam

7 February 2007
15:30 UTC+07:00

Indonesia	1 – 0	Maldives
Mulyana 90+3'	Report

Gelora Bung Karno Stadium, Jakarta
Attendance: 0
Referee: Sarkar Subrata (India)

7 February 2007
19:30 UTC+08:00

Singapore	1 – 2	Pakistan
Amri 57'	Report	Hussain 79'; Shah 87'

Jalan Besar Stadium, Singapore
Attendance: 1,589
Referee: Rustam Saidov (Uzbekistan)

7 February 2007
15:00 UTC+05:00

Turkmenistan	0 – 1	Thailand
	Report	Buathong 78'

Olympic Stadium, Ashgabat
Attendance: 2,500
Referee: Hedayat Mombini (Iran)

7 February 2007
16:00 UTC+03:00

Yemen	2 – 1	Palestine
Yasser 11'; Omar 74'	Report	Obaid 12'

Althawra Sports City Stadium, Sana'a
Attendance: 7,000
Referee: Muhsen Basma (Syria)

7 February 2007
19:00 UTC+09:30

Australia	11 – 0	Chinese Taipei
Milligan 4'; Burns 10'; Sarkies 45', 63', 84', 89'; Djite 48'; Stanley 62', 78'; Cornthwaite 81'; Vidošić 90'	Report

Hindmarsh Stadium, Adelaide
Attendance: 1,459
Referee: Yuichi Nishimura (Japan)

7 February 2007
16:00 UTC+05:00

Uzbekistan	4 – 1	Tajikistan
Abdullaev 41'; Ismailov 47', 48'; Ahmedov 67'	Report	Rabimov 52'

Pakhtakor Markaziy Stadium, Tashkent
Attendance: 5,000
Referee: Satop Tongkhan (Thailand)

7 February 2007
16:00 UTC+06:30

Myanmar	1 – 1	India
Kyaw Thiha 83'	Report	Nabi 38'

Thuwunna Stadium, Yangon
Attendance: 4,000
Referee: Malik Abdul Bashir (Singapore)

Jordan	w/o	Kyrgyzstan

Jordan automatically advanced to the Second Round as Kyrgyzstan withdrew.

Notes

- Note 1: The first leg of the Vietnam–Afghanistan match in Hanoi was cancelled due to the Afghanistan team's financial problems that led to the team being unable to afford to travel to Vietnam, and security worries. FIFA rescheduled the single-tie match to 14 February 2007.

=== Second leg ===
14 February 2007
19:30 UTC+08:00

Hong Kong	0 – 1	Bangladesh
	Report	Ameli 44'

Hong Kong Stadium, Hong Kong
Attendance: 1,000
Referee: Kim Dong-Jin (South Korea)

Hong Kong won 3–1 on aggregate.

14 February 2007
17:00 UTC+07:00

Vietnam	2 – 0	Afghanistan
Huỳnh Phúc Hiệp 34'; Nguyễn Vũ Phong 46'	Report

Thiên Trường Stadium, Nam Định
Attendance: 10,000
Referee: Lee Gi-Young (South Korea)

Vietnam won 2–0 on aggregate.

14 February 2007
16:00 UTC+05:00

Maldives	0 – 0	Indonesia
	Report

Rasmee Dhandu Stadium, Malé
Attendance: 8,000
Referee: Ala Abdul Nema (Iraq)

Indonesia won 1–0 on aggregate.

14 February 2007
14:00 UTC+05:00

Pakistan	3 – 2	Singapore
Shah 65', 76'; Rasool 89'	Report	Amri 31', 39'

Punjab Stadium, Lahore
Attendance: 3,000
Referee: Abdulrahman Abdou (Qatar)

Pakistan won 5–3 on aggregate.

14 February 2007
19:00 UTC+07:00

Thailand	5 – 1	Turkmenistan
Dangda 32'; Winothai 33', 42'; Buathong 60'; Wongdee 72'	Report	Saiwaeo 47' (o.g.)

Suphachalasai Stadium, Bangkok
Attendance: 12,000
Referee: Saad Kamil Al-Fadhli (Kuwait)

Thailand won 6–1 on aggregate.

14 February 2007
17:00 UTC+02:00

Palestine	1 – 1	Yemen
Obaid 90'	Report	Yasser

Al-Maktoum Stadium, Dubai (United Arab Emirates)
Attendance: 800
Referee: Ali Al Mutlaq (Saudi Arabia)

Yemen won 3–2 on aggregate.

14 February 2007
18:00 UTC+08:00

Chinese Taipei	0 – 1	Australia
	Report	Milligan 66'

Zhongshan Soccer Stadium, Taipei
Attendance: 2,500
Referee: Rosdi Shaharul (Malaysia)

Australia won 12–0 on aggregate.

14 February 2007
14:00 UTC+05:00

Tajikistan	0 – 2	Uzbekistan
	Report	Ismailov 30'; Bikmaev 90+3'

Central Republican Stadium, Dushanbe
Attendance: 19,000
Referee: Salem Mujghef (Jordan)

Uzbekistan won 6–1 on aggregate.

14 February 2007
14:15 UTC+05:30

India	1 – 1 (a.e.t.)	Myanmar
Singh 40'	Report	Win 90+2'
Penalties
	5 – 2

Salt Lake Stadium, Kolkata
Attendance: 500
Referee: Ali Al Badwawi (United Arab Emirates)

2–2 on aggregate. India won after penalties
