= Football at the 2008 Summer Olympics – Men's Asian Qualifiers =

Tournament details
- Dates: 7 February – 21 November 2007
- Teams: 24 (from 1 confederation)

The Asian Football Confederation's Pre-Olympic Tournament was held from 7 February to 21 November 2007. Twenty-four teams entered the qualification for the three allocated spots for the 2008 Summer Olympics Football tournament in Beijing.

The qualification saw Australia, Korea Republic, and Japan winning their final round groups and qualifying to the Olympics.

== Format ==
Asian berths for the final is 3 plus the host China PR (automatically qualified).

Preliminary round
14 highest seeded teams received byes for the second round. Other 20 teams were paired, where each pair played home and away. The 10 winners would advance to the second round.
Second round
24 teams were grouped into 6 groups of 4 teams each, where each group would consist of home and away round-robin tournament. The winners and runners-up of each group would advance to the final stage.
Final round
12 teams were grouped into 3 groups of 4 teams each, where each group would consist of home and away round-robin tournament. The winners of each group would qualify to the finals.

== Preliminary round 1 ==
The first legs were played on 7 February and the second legs on 14 February 2007. The aggregate winners advanced to the second round.

Team 1	Agg.	Team 2	1st leg	2nd leg
Myanmar	2–2 (2–5 p)	India	1–1	1–1 (a.e.t.)
Afghanistan	0–2	Vietnam	—^{1}	0–2
Australia	12–0	Chinese Taipei	11–0	1–0
Bangladesh	1–3	Hong Kong	0–3	1–0
Singapore	3–5	Pakistan	1–2	2–3
Uzbekistan	6–1	Tajikistan	4–1	2–0
Palestine	2–3	Yemen	1–2	1–1
Thailand	6–1	Turkmenistan	1–0	5–1
Indonesia	1–0	Maldives	1–0	0–0
Jordan	—	Kyrgyzstan^{2}	—	—

^{1} The first leg of the Vietnam–Afghanistan match in Hanoi was cancelled due to the Afghanistan team's financial problems that led to the team being unable to afford to travel to Vietnam, and security worries. FIFA rescheduled the single-tie match to 14 February 2007.

^{2} Withdrew'

== Preliminary round 2 ==
Matches were played from 28 February to 6 June 2007. The top two teams in each group advancing to the final round.

Group A

Team	Pld	W	D	L	GF	GA	GD	Pts	BHR	QAT	KUW	PAK
Bahrain	6	4	0	2	17	11	+6	12		4–2	2–1	8–0
Qatar	6	3	2	1	18	7	+11	11	4–0		2–2	7–0
Kuwait	6	3	2	1	14	5	+9	11	3–0	1–1		4–0
Pakistan	6	0	0	6	1	27	−26	0	1–3	0–2	0–3	

Group B

Team	Pld	W	D	L	GF	GA	GD	Pts	JPN	SYR	MAS	HKG
Japan	6	6	0	0	17	2	+15	18		3–0	3–1	3–0
Syria	6	3	1	2	9	7	+2	10	0–2		3–1	4–1
Malaysia	6	1	1	4	4	9	−5	4	1–2	0–0		0–1
Hong Kong	6	1	0	5	2	14	−12	3	0–4	0–2	0–1	

Group C

Team	Pld	W	D	L	GF	GA	GD	Pts	Qualification	VIE	LIB	OMA	IDN
Vietnam	6	4	0	2	8	5	+3	12	Advance to the third round		2–0	2–0	2–1
Lebanon	5	4	0	1	6	4	+2	12	Advance to the third round	1–0		1–0	2–1
Oman	5	2	0	3	7	6	+1	6		3–1	Canc...		3–0
Indonesia	6	1	0	5	5	11	−6	3		0–1	1–2	2–1	

Group D

Team	Pld	W	D	L	GF	GA	GD	Pts	KSA	AUS	IRN	JOR
Saudi Arabia	6	5	0	1	11	6	+5	15		2–1	1–0	4–1
Australia	6	3	2	1	11	4	+7	11	2–0		3–1	1–1
Iran	6	1	2	3	6	7	−1	5	2–3	0–0		0–0
Jordan	6	0	2	4	2	13	−11	2	0–1	0–4	0–3	

Group E

Team	Pld	W	D	L	GF	GA	GD	Pts	IRQ	PRK	THA	IND
Iraq	6	3	3	0	9	4	+5	12		0–0	1–1	3–0
North Korea	6	3	2	1	7	4	+3	11	2–2		0–0	2–1
Thailand	6	1	2	3	3	6	−3	5	0–1	0–1		2–0
India	6	1	1	4	5	10	−5	4	1–1	0–2	0–1	

Group F

Team	Pld	W	D	L	GF	GA	GD	Pts	KOR	UZB	UAE	YEM
South Korea	6	5	0	1	10	3	+7	15		2–0	3–1	1–0
Uzbekistan	6	4	0	2	8	4	+4	12	0–1		2–1	3–0
United Arab Emirates	6	2	0	4	7	11	−4	6	1–3	0–2		2–0
Yemen	6	1	0	5	2	9	−7	3	1–0	0–1	1–2	

== Preliminary round 3 ==
The final round was played in three groups of four teams each held from 22 August to 21 November 2007. The winner of each group will represent Asia at the 2008 Olympic Games with host China. The groups were drawn on 13 June.

Group A

Team	Pld	W	D	L	GF	GA	GD	Pts	AUS	IRQ	PRK	LIB
Australia	6	3	3	0	7	1	+6	12		2–0	1–0	3–0
Iraq	6	3	2	1	12	4	+8	11	0–0		2–0	5–2
North Korea	6	1	2	3	3	6	−3	5	1–1	0–0		0–1
Lebanon	6	1	1	4	4	15	−11	4	0–0	0–5	1–2	

Group B

Team	Pld	W	D	L	GF	GA	GD	Pts	KOR	BHR	SYR	UZB
South Korea	6	3	3	0	4	1	+3	12		0–0	1–0	2–1
Bahrain	6	3	2	1	7	4	+3	11	0–1		1–1	2–0
Syria	6	0	4	2	5	7	−2	4	0–0	1–2		3–3
Uzbekistan	6	0	3	3	5	9	−4	3	0–0	1–2	0–0	

Group C

Team	Pld	W	D	L	GF	GA	GD	Pts	Qualification	JPN	QAT	KSA	VIE
Japan	6	3	2	1	7	2	+5	11	Final tournament		1–0	0–0	1–0
Qatar	6	3	1	2	8	6	+2	10		2–1		1–0	3–1
Saudi Arabia	6	2	3	1	5	3	+2	9		0–0	2–1		2–0
Vietnam	6	0	2	4	3	12	−9	2		0–4	1–1	1–1	

== See also ==
- Football at the 2008 Summer Olympics
- Football at the 2008 Summer Olympics – Women's qualification#AFC (Asia)
