= Mustafa Mehrzad =

Afghan team manager

Personal information
- Place of birth: Parwan, Afghanistan

Managerial career
- Years: Team
- 2012–2020: Afghanistan (team manager)
- 2015: Afghanistan U-23 (team manager)

Mustafa Mehrzad (Dari: مصطفى مهرزاد) is an Afghan team manager.

== National team ==
Oversaw Afghanistan's training ahead of their friendly in Pakistan. His incumbency as Afghanistan National team manager ended when he was dismissed from his duties as another manager took his place. He returned as the team manager of the national team after the new head coach Otto Pfister was announced.

== U-23 ==
He managed the Afghanistan U23 in all of their 2016 AFC U-23 Championship games with head coach Hosein Saleh.
