= Hussein Amine =

Lebanese footballer

Personal information
- Full name: Hussein Hassan Amine
- Date of birth: 15 April 1985 (age 41)
- Place of birth: Odaisseh, Lebanon
- Height: 1.78 m (5 ft 10 in)
- Position: Defender

Senior career*
| Years | Team | Apps | (Gls) |
| 2002–2011 | Ansar | | (2) |
| 2011–2013 | Ahkaa Ahli Aley | 27 | (0) |
| Total | | 91 | (2) |

International career
| 2007 | Lebanon U23 | | (1) |
| 2007–2009 | Lebanon | 16 | (0) |
- * Club domestic league appearances and goals

Hussein Hassan Amine (Arabic: حُسَيْن حَسَن أَمِين; born 15 March 1985) is a Lebanese former footballer who played as a defender for Ansar, Akhaa Ahli Aley, and the Lebanon national team.

Starting from 2002, Amine played for Lebanese Premier League side Ansar. He won two league titles and two FA Cups with Ansar, before moving to Akhaa Ahli Aley in 2011. In 2013, he retired from football. Amine also represented Lebanon internationally, playing 16 matches between 2007 and 2009.

== Club career ==
Amine began his senior career at Lebanese Premier League side Ansar, during the 2002–03 season. Amine helped Ansar win two domestic doubles in a row, winning both the league and FA Cup in 2005–06 and 2006–07. Amine also won another FA Cup with Ansar, in 2009–10.

In 2011 Amine joined Akhaa Ahli Aley; he played 21 games in his first season (2011–12), and six games in his second season (2012–13). Amine retired from football in 2013.

== International career ==
Amine played for the Lebanon national under-23 team at the 2008 Olympics qualifiers. His first game for the U23s was on 28 February 2007, in a 2–0 defeat to Vietnam. Amine also scored a goal on 28 March 2007, helping Lebanon beat Indonesia 2–1.

Amine made his senior international debut for Lebanon on 20 June 2007 at the 2007 WAFF Championship, with Lebanon losing 3–0 to Jordan. The defender's first international clean sheet came the following match, on 20 January 2008, in a goalless draw against China in a friendly. Amine played 16 games for Lebanon, between 2007 and 2009.

== Honours ==
Ansar

- Lebanese Premier League: 2005–06, 2006–07
- Lebanese FA Cup: 2005–06, 2006–07, 2009–10
