= Magid Mohamed =

Qatari footballer (born 1985)

Personal information
- Full name: Magid Mohamed Hassan
- Date of birth: October 1, 1985 (age 41)
- Place of birth: Khartoum, Sudan
- Height: 1.75 m (5 ft 9 in)
- Position: Midfielder

Team information
- Current team: Al Bidda
- Number: 12

Senior career*
Years	Team	Apps	(Gls)
2004–2005	Al-Sailiya	11	(3)
2005–2009	Al Sadd	68	(17)
2008–2009	→ Al-Sailiya (loan)	10	(1)
2009–2010	Al Sadd	20	(5)
2010–2011	Al-Sailiya	18	(2)
2011–2012	Al Sadd	17	(6)
2012–2017	El Jaish	85	(9)
2017–2020	Al Ahli	47	(2)
2020–2024	Al-Shamal	48	(2)
2024–	Al Bidda		

International career^{‡}
2003–2016	Qatar	80	(13)
- * Club domestic league appearances and goals as of 28 April 2024 ‡ National team caps and goals as of 27 March 2016

Magid Mohamed (Arabic: ماجد محمد; born 1 October 1985) is a footballer who plays for Al Bidda as a midfielder. Born in Sudan, he represented the Qatar national team.

== Identity controversy ==
In 2007, the Saudi Arabia Football Federation lodged an official complaint against Qatar for fielding Magid in an Olympic qualifying match, who was thought to be ineligible due to his age. The complaint was based on the belief that Magid was born in November 1982, in Cairo, Egypt. According to the SFA, he was a Sudanese national who moved to Saudi Arabia with his father and studied in Omar bin Abdulaziz school in Jeddah - which is where the Saudi government obtained Majed's records from - before moving to Qatar and becoming a citizen. The complaint was made directly after a qualification match for the 2008 Summer Olympics, which Qatar had won. The rules of FIFA state that any player over the age of 23 cannot participate in the competition, whereas Magid was believed to be 25 at the time.

Shortly after, the Qatar Football Association released an article in response to the SFA's allegations. The article stated that "Magid Mohamed Imam Salima" was born in Khartoum, Sudan, on August 17, 1985. In contradiction to this statement indicating his age, his profile on the official QFA website, in addition to his passport, showed Magid's date of birth as October 1, 1985. To further add to the confusion, his name is most widely recognized as "Magid Mohamed Hassan", as opposed to the former.

He was eventually cleared to play, and took part in the Olympic team's next match against Saudi Arabia, scoring Qatar's only goal of the match.

== Club career statistics ==
Statistics accurate as of 21 August 2011

Club	Season	League	League		Cup^{1}		League Cup^{2}		Continental^{3}		Total	
Club	Season	League	Apps	Goals	Apps	Goals	Apps	Goals	Apps	Goals	Apps	Goals
Al-Sailiya	2003–04	QSL	11	3								
Al-Sailiya	2008–09	QSL	10	1								
Al-Sailiya	2010–11	QSL	18	2								
Al-Sailiya	Total		39	6								
Al-Sadd	2005–06	QSL	21	5								
Al-Sadd	2006–07	QSL	20	7								
Al-Sadd	2007–08	QSL	19	4								
Al-Sadd	2008–09	QSL	8	1								
Al-Sadd	2009–10	QSL	20	5								
Al-Sadd	2011–12	QSL	13	6								
Al-Sadd	Total		88	22								
Career total			127	28								

^{1}Includes Emir of Qatar Cup.

^{2}Includes Sheikh Jassem Cup.

^{3}Includes AFC Champions League.

== Career statistics ==
=== Senior international goals ===
#	Date	Venue	Opponent	Score	Result	Competition
1.	2006	Hong Kong, China	Hong Kong	3–0	Won	2007 AFC Asian Cup qualification
2.	January 13, 2007	Doha, Qatar	Oman	1–1	Draw	Friendly
3.	March 16, 2008	Doha, Qatar	Jordan	2–1	Won	Friendly
4.	July 18, 2008	Beijing, China	Indonesia	1–2	Lost	2004 AFC Asian Cup
5.	August 20, 2008	Doha, Qatar	Tajikistan	5–0	Won	Friendly
6.	September 6, 2008	Doha, Qatar	Uzbekistan	3–0	Won	2010 FIFA World Cup qualification
7.	27 December 2009	Doha, Qatar	Iran	3–2	Win	9th International Friendship Tournament
8.	27 December 2009	Doha, Qatar	Iran	3–2	Win	9th International Friendship Tournament
9.	12 October 2010	Doha, Qatar	Iraq	1–2	Lost	Friendly
10.	24 May 2013	Doha, Qatar	Latvia	3–1	Won	Friendly
