= An Chol-hyok =

North Korean footballer (born 1987)

An Chol-Hyok
Personal information
- Date of birth: 27 June 1987 (age 39)
- Place of birth: Kanggye, North Korea
- Height: 1.78 m (5 ft 10 in)
- Position: Striker

Senior career*
Years	Team	Apps	(Gls)
2003–2014	Rimyongsu		

International career
2005–2011	North Korea	29	(11)
- * Club domestic league appearances and goals as of 20 July 2021

- An Chol-hyok
- Hangul: 안철혁
- Hanja: 安哲赫
- RR: An Cheolhyeok
- MR: An Ch'ŏrhyŏk

An Chol-Hyok (Korean: 안철혁, born 27 June 1987) is a North Korean former professional footballer who played for Rimyongsu Sports Group. He represented North Korea at the 2010 FIFA World Cup.

== Career statistics ==
#	Date	Venue	Opponent	Score	Result	Competition
1.	17 August 2005	Manama, Bahrain	Bahrain	3–2	Won	2006 FIFA World Cup qualification
2.	26 December 2005	Phuket, Thailand	Latvia	1–1	Draw	Friendly
3.	24 June 2007	Singapore, Singapore	Singapore	1–2	Lost	Friendly
4.	28 June 2007	Singapore, Singapore	Oman	2–2	Draw	Friendly
5.	24 December 2007	Bangkok, Thailand	Uzbekistan	2–2	Draw	2007 King's Cup
6.	6 September 2008	Abu Dhabi, UAE	United Arab Emirates	2–1	Won	2010 FIFA World Cup qualification
7.	23 August 2009	Kaohsiung, Taiwan	Guam	9–2	Won	2010 East Asian Football Championship
8.	23 August 2009	Kaohsiung, Taiwan	Guam	9–2	Won	2010 East Asian Football Championship
9.	23 August 2009	Kaohsiung, Taiwan	Guam	9–2	Won	2010 East Asian Football Championship
10.	23 August 2009	Kaohsiung, Taiwan	Guam	9–2	Won	2010 East Asian Football Championship
11.	4 January 2011	Manama, Bahrain	Bahrain	1–0	Won	Friendly
