= Hamzeh Salameh =

Lebanese footballer (born 1986)

- Salameh with Safa in 2020

Personal information
- Full name: Hamzeh Jihad Salameh
- Date of birth: 3 May 1986 (age 40)
- Place of birth: Baraachit, Lebanon
- Height: 1.75 m (5 ft 9 in)
- Position: Defensive midfielder

Senior career*
Years	Team	Apps	(Gls)
2005–2008	Safa		(4)
2008–2012	Ahed		(3)
2012–2014	Safa	41	(11)
2014–2015	Naft Maysan		(1)
2015	Al-Nasr Salalah		
2015–2016	Safa	3	(0)
2016	Al-Najaf		(1)
2016–2017	Nejmeh	11	(0)
2017–2018	Racing Beirut	15	(1)
2018–2020	Chabab Ghazieh	19	(3)
2020–2021	Safa	13	(0)

International career
2007	Lebanon U23		
2004–2013	Lebanon	11	(0)
- * Club domestic league appearances and goals

Hamzeh Jihad Salameh (Arabic: حمزة جهاد سلامة; born 3 May 1986) is a Lebanese former footballer who played as a defensive midfielder.

== Club career ==
On 26 September 2020, Salameh returned to Safa after leaving them in 2016.

== Honours ==
Ahed

- Lebanese Premier League: 2009–10, 2010–11
- Lebanese FA Cup: 2008–09, 2010–11

Safa

- Lebanese Premier League: 2012–13, 2015–16

Individual

- Lebanese Premier League Team of the Season: 2013–14
