= Keivan Amraei =

Iranian footballer

Personal information
- Full name: Keivan Amraei
- Date of birth: February 11, 1986 (age 40)
- Place of birth: Kuhdasht, Iran
- Height: 1.81 m (5 ft 11 in)
- Positions: Winger; striker

Team information
- Current team: Pars Jonoubi
- Number: 19

Youth career
- 2004–2006: Zob Ahan

Senior career*
Years	Team	Apps	(Gls)
2006–2010	Zob Ahan	70	(14)
2010–2013	Mes Kerman	67	(6)
2013–2014	Saba Qom	17	(1)
2014–2015	Padideh	8	(0)
2015	Naft Masjed Soleyman	10	(1)
2015–2016	Mes Kerman	36	(4)
2016–2017	Saba Qom	30	(6)
2017–2018	Siah Jamegan	18	(2)
2018–2019	Oxin Alborz	12	(2)
2019–	Pars Jonoubi	1	(0)

International career^{‡}
2008	Iran U20	5	(?)
2007	Iran U23	3	(2)
2008	Iran	0	(0)
- * Club domestic league appearances and goals as of 30 December 2018 ‡ National team caps and goals as of 18 June 2007

Keivan Amraei (Persian: کیوان امرایی; born February 11, 1986) is an Iranian footballer. He currently plays for F.C. Pars Jonoubi Jam in the Persian Gulf Pro League. He usually plays as a striker.

== Club career ==
A product of the Zob Ahan youth system, Amraei was drafted into the first team for the IPL 2006/07 season and at the age of 16 proved to be a success, becoming an influential member of Zob Ahan's attack alongside experienced national side player Mehdi Rajabzadeh. He had a good season after that but in 2008–09 season he was mostly injured which forced him out of the squad most of the times.

=== Club career statistics ===
- Last Update: 1 August 2014

Club performance			League		Cup		Continental		Total	
Season	Club	League	Apps	Goals	Apps	Goals	Apps	Goals	Apps	Goals
Iran			League		Hazfi Cup		Asia		Total	
2006–07	Zob Ahan	Pro League	18	6	0	0	–	–	18	6
2007–08	Zob Ahan	Pro League	29	7	2	0	–	–	31	7
2008–09	Zob Ahan	Pro League	4	0	0	0	–	–	4	0
2009–10	Zob Ahan	Pro League	19	1	0	0	1	0	20	1
2010–11	Mes Kerman	Pro League	21	2	0	0	–	–	21	2
2011–12	Mes Kerman	Pro League	27	3			–	–	27	3
2012–13	Mes Kerman	Pro League	19	1	0	0	–	–	20	1
2013–14	Saba Qom	Pro League	16	1	0	0	–	–	16	1
2014–15	Padideh	Pro League	1	0	0	0	–	–	1	0
Career total			154	21	2	0	1	0	157	21

- Assist Goals

Season	Team	Assists
06–07	Zob Ahan	1
07–08	Zob Ahan	5
10–11	Mes Kerman	0

== International career ==
Amraei was called up to the Iran national under-23 football team qualifying squad for the 2008 Beijing Olympics.
