= Afghanistan national under-23 football team =

Afghanistan Olympic
- Association: Afghanistan Football Federation (AFF)
- Confederation: AFC (Asia)
- FIFA code: AFG
First colours	Second colours	Third colours

First international
- Afghanistan 0–1 India (Chittagong, Bangladesh; 29 January 2010)

Biggest win
- Sri Lanka 0–2 Afghanistan (Chittagong, Bangladesh; 2 February 2010); Nepal 0–2 Afghanistan (Al Rayyan, Qatar; 26 March 2019)

Biggest defeat
- Uzbekistan 8–1 Afghanistan (Tashkent, Uzbekistan; 6 September 2023)

South Asian Games
- Appearances: 1 (first in 2010)
- Best result: Runners-up (2010)

The Afghanistan national under-23 football team represents Afghanistan in international football competitions during Olympic Games and Asian Games.

This is due to the Olympic rules stating that men's football teams have to be under-23 with the exceptions of 3 players per roster.

== Competitive record ==
=== AFC U-23 Asian Cup ===
AFC U-23 Asian Cup record											Qualification record					
Year	Host	Round	Position	Pld	W	D	L	GF	GA	Squad	Pld	W	D	L	GF	GA
2013	Oman	Did not enter									Did not enter					
2016	Qatar	Did not qualify									4	1	1	2	2	8
2018	China	Did not qualify									3	0	0	3	0	18
2020	Thailand	Did not qualify									3	1	0	2	3	4
2022	Uzbekistan	Withdrew									Withdrew					
2024	Qatar	Did not qualify									3	0	1	2	1	12
2026	Saudi Arabia	Did not qualify									3	1	0	2	2	5
2028	Japan	To be determined									To be determined					
Total		—	0/8	0	0	0	0	0	0	—	16	3	2	11	8	47

=== Summer Olympics ===
Young teams were favoured by FIFA and the IOC, and since 1992, male competitors must be under 23 years old, with three over-23 players allowed per squad.

Gold medalists Silver medalists Bronze medalists

Summer Olympics record											Qualification record						
Year	Host	Round	Position	Pld	W	D	L	GF	GA	Squad	Pos.	Pld	W	D	L	GF	GA
1908 to 1988	See Afghanistan national football team										See Afghanistan national football team						
1992	Spain	Withdrew									Withdrew						
1996	United States	Did not enter									Did not enter						
2000	Australia	Did not enter									Did not enter						
2004	Greece	Did not enter									Did not enter						
2008	China	Did not qualify									PR1	1	0	0	1	0	2
2012	United Kingdom	Did not enter									Did not enter						
2016	Brazil	Did not qualify									4th	4	1	1	2	2	8
2020	Japan	Did not qualify									3rd	3	1	0	2	3	4
2024	France	Did not qualify									3rd	3	0	1	2	1	12
2028	USA	To be determined									To be determined						
Total		—	0/9	0	0	0	0	0	0	—	4/9	11	2	2	7	6	26

=== Asian Games ===
Asian Games record
Year	Host	Round	Position	Pld	W	D	L	GF	GA	Squad
1951 to 1998	See Afghanistan national football team									
2002	South Korea	Group Stage	24th	3	0	0	3	0	32	Squad
2006	Qatar	Did not enter								
2010	China	Did not enter								
2014	South Korea	Group Stage	25th	3	0	0	3	1	8	Squad
2018	Indonesia	Did not enter								
2022	China	Withdrew								
2026	Japan	Did not enter								
2030	Qatar	TBD								
2034	Saudi Arabia	TBD								
Total		Fourth place	2/6	10	0	0	10	5	57	—

== Notable players ==
- Israfeel Kohistani
- Balal Arezou
- Faisal Sakhizada
- Waheed Nadeem

== See also ==
- Football at the 2014 Asian Games
- Football at the 2014 Asian Games – Men's team squads
- 2016 AFC U-23 Championship qualification
- Afghanistan national football team
- Afghanistan women's national football team
