= Hiroyoshi Takayama =

Japanese football referee (born 1974)

- Full name: Hiroyoshi Takayama
- Born: 18 March 1974 (age 52); Japan

International
Years	League	Role
2004-2013	FIFA	Referee
2008-2013	AFC	Referee

Hiroyoshi Takayama (高山啓義, Takayama Hiroyoshi; born 18 March 1974) is a Japanese football referee who has been a full international referee for FIFA.

Takayama became a FIFA referee in 2004. He also refereed in 2010 and 2014 FIFA World Cup qualifiers.
