= Jufain Al-Bishi =

Saudi Arabian footballer

Personal information
- Full name: Jufain Al-Bishi
- Date of birth: May 1, 1987 (age 39)
- Place of birth: Jeddah, Saudi Arabia
- Height: 1.78 m (5 ft 10 in)
- Position: Defender

Youth career
- ???–2004: Al-Nakhil
- 2004–2005: Al-Ahli

Senior career*
Years	Team	Apps	(Gls)
2005–2013	Al-Ahli	68	(2)
2013–2017	Al-Raed	64	(2)
2017–2018	Al-Taawon	23	(4)
2019	Ohod	0	(0)

International career
2005–2008	Saudi Arabia U-20	4	(2)
2008–2010	Saudi Arabia U-23	11	(0)
2010	Saudi Arabia	2	(0)
- * Club domestic league appearances and goals

Jufain Al-Bishi (Arabic: جفين البيشي; born 1 May 1987) is a Saudi Arabian footballer who plays.

== Honours ==
=== Al-Ahli (Jeddah) ===
- Crown Prince Cup: 2007
- Saudi Federation cup: 2007
- GCC Club Cup: 2008
- Kings Cup: 2011, 2012

=== National Team U-23 ===
- GCC U-23 Championship: 2008
