= Yemen national under-23 football team =

National association football team

Yemen U-23
- Nickname: Al-Yemen A'sa'eed
- Association: Yemen Football Association
- Confederation: AFC (Asia)
- Head coach: Abraham Mbarato
- Home stadium: Althawra Sports City Stadium
- FIFA code: YEM
First colours	Second colours

Biggest win
- Yemen 5–1 Bangladesh (Kathmandu, Nepal; 24 June 2012); Yemen 5–1 Guam (Haiphong, Vietnam; 12 September 2023)

Biggest defeat
- Iraq 5–0 Yemen (Kuwait City, Kuwait; 22 March 2019)

The Yemen national under-23 football team represents Yemen in international under 23 football competitions.

== Results and fixtures ==
=== All-time record ===
As of 27 April 2026

- Biggest Win: Yemen 5–1 vs. Bangladesh on 24 June 2012; Yemen 5–1 vs. Guam on 12 September 2023.
- Heaviest Defeat: Iraq 5–0 vs. Yemen on 22 March 2019 during the 2020 AFC U-23 Championship qualification.

== Olympic Record ==
Summer Olympic Games Record
Year	Result	Position	Pld	W	D	L	GF	GA
1908–1988	See Yemen national team							
(Spain) 1992	Did not qualify							
(United States) 1996	Did not enter							
(Australia) 2000	Did not qualify							
(Greece) 2004	Did not qualify							
(China) 2008	Did not qualify							
(United Kingdom) 2012	Did not qualify							
(Brazil) 2016	Did not qualify							
(Japan) 2020	Did not qualify							
(France) 2024	Did not qualify							
(United States) 2028	To be determined							
Total		0 / 7	0	0	0	0	0	0

== Asian Games Record ==
(Under-23 Team Since 2002)

Asian Games
Year	Round	GP	W	D	L	GF	GA
(South Korea) 2002	Group Stage	3	1	0	2	3	5
(Qatar) 2006	DNQ	–	–	–	–	–	–
(China) 2010	DNQ	–	–	–	–	–	–
(South Korea) 2014	DNQ	–	–	–	–	–	–
Total	Total	3	1	0	2	3	5

== U-23 Asian Cup Record ==
(Under-22 in 2013)

AFC U-23 Asian Cup									Asian Cup Qualifications					
Year	Result	Position	GP	W	D*	L	GS	GA	GP	W	D*	L	GS	GA
(Oman) 2013	Group stage	15th	3	0	0	3	1	5	4	2	1	1	7	6
(Qatar) 2016	Group stage	16th	3	0	0	3	1	10	3	2	0	1	7	2
(China) 2018	Did not enter								Did not enter					
(Thailand) 2020	Did not qualify								3	0	1	2	0	8
(Uzbekistan) 2022	Did not qualify								3	1	1	1	3	3
(Qatar) 2024	Did not qualify								3	2	0	1	8	2
(Saudi Arabia) 2026	Did not qualify								3	2	0	1	3	2
(Japan) 2028	To be determined								To be determined					
Total	Best: Group Stage	-	6	0	0	6	2	15	19	9	3	7	28	23

== Recent results and forthcoming fixtures ==
Win Draw Loss

Date	Location	Opponent	Score*	Competition

== Players ==
=== Current squad ===
Squad called up for 2014 AFC U-22 qualification

No.	Pos.	Player	Date of birth (age)	Caps	Goals	Club
1	GK	Shukri Dahyah (Captain)	1 January 1990 (age 36)			(Yemen Football Association)
22	GK	Mohammed Waleed	1 January 1990 (age 36)			(Yemen Football Association)
28	GK	Esam AL Hakimi	1 January 1990 (age 36)			(Yemen Football Association)
4	DF	Ebrahim Gehamah	1 January 1990 (age 36)			(Yemen Football Association)
8	DF	Hussein Sadam	1 January 1990 (age 36)	4	3	(Yemen Football Association)
19	DF	Ali Ghurabah	1 January 1990 (age 36)			(Yemen Football Association)
25	DF	Ammar Hamsan	1 January 1990 (age 36)			(Yemen Football Association)
2	DF	Motazz Ahmed	1 January 1990 (age 36)			(Yemen Football Association)
12	DF	Mohammed Al-Ghamri	1 January 1990 (age 36)			(Yemen Football Association)
29	DF	Radhawan Al-Hubaishi	1 January 1990 (age 36)			(Yemen Football Association)
11	MF	Yaser Al-Shaibani	1 January 1990 (age 36)			(Yemen Football Association)
27	MF	Mohammed Al-Sarori	1 January 1990 (age 36)	4	1	(Yemen Football Association)
32	MF	Essam Al-Worafi	1 January 1990 (age 36)			(Yemen Football Association)
36	MF	Ammar Zaidan	1 January 1990 (age 36)			(Yemen Football Association)
7	MF	Haithm Sasaah	1 January 1990 (age 36)			(Yemen Football Association)
9	MF	Mohammed Al-Shamsi	1 January 1990 (age 36)			(Yemen Football Association)
13	MF	Maged Nader	1 January 1990 (age 36)			(Yemen Football Association)
24	MF	Basheer Al-Manifi	1 January 1990 (age 36)			(Yemen Football Association)
10	FW	Yaser Al-Gabr	1 January 1990 (age 36)	4	2	(Yemen Football Association) Al-Oruba
15	FW	Salem Al-Omzae	1 January 1990 (age 36)	4	1	(Yemen Football Association)
33	FW	Saddam Al-Sharif	1 January 1990 (age 36)			(Yemen Football Association)
17	FW	Ali Abdulkarem	1 January 1990 (age 36)			(Yemen Football Association)

== See also ==
- Yemen national football team
