= 2007 AFC Asian Cup squads =

This article lists the confirmed national football squads for the 2007 AFC Asian Cup tournament jointly held in Malaysia, Indonesia, Thailand and Vietnam between 7 July and 29 July 2007.

Before announcing their final squad, several teams named a provisional squad of 23 to 30 players, but each country's final squad of 23 players had to be submitted by 16 June 2007. Replacement of injured players was permitted until 24 hours before the team's first Asian Cup game. Players marked (c) were named as captain for their national squad. Number of caps counts until the start of the tournament, including all pre-tournament friendlies.

== Group A ==
=== Thailand ===
Head coach: (Thailand) Charnwit Polcheewin

No.	Pos.	Player	Date of birth (age)	Caps	Club
1	GK	Weera Koedpudsa	1 July 1984 (aged 23)		(Thailand) Bangkok University
2	DF	Suree Sukha	27 July 1982 (aged 24)		(England) Manchester City
3	DF	Patiparn Phetphun	25 September 1980 (aged 26)		(Thailand) Bangkok University
4	DF	Jetsada Jitsawad	5 August 1980 (aged 26)		(Thailand) Tobacco Monopoly
5	DF	Niweat Siriwong	18 July 1977 (aged 29)		(Thailand) BEC Tero Sasana
6	DF	Nattaporn Phanrit	11 January 1982 (aged 25)		(Thailand) Provincial Electricity
7	MF	Datsakorn Thonglao	30 December 1983 (aged 23)		(Vietnam) Hoàng Anh Gia Lai
8	MF	Suchao Nuchnum	17 May 1983 (aged 24)		(Thailand) TOT FC
9	MF	Therdsak Chaiman	29 September 1973 (aged 33)		Singapore Armed Forces
10	MF	Tawan Sripan (c)	13 December 1971 (aged 35)		(Thailand) BEC Tero Sasana
12	MF	Nirut Surasiang	20 February 1979 (aged 28)		(Vietnam) SQC Bình Định F.C.
13	FW	Kiatisuk Senamuang	11 August 1973 (aged 33)		(Vietnam) Hoàng Anh Gia Lai
14	FW	Teeratep Winothai	16 February 1985 (aged 22)		(Thailand) BEC Tero Sasana
16	DF	Kiatprawut Saiwaeo	24 January 1986 (aged 21)		(England) Manchester City
17	FW	Sutee Suksomkit	5 June 1978 (aged 29)		(Singapore) Tampines Rovers
18	GK	Kosin Hathairattanakool	23 March 1982 (aged 25)		(Thailand) Chonburi
19	MF	Pichitphong Choeichiu	28 August 1982 (aged 24)		(Thailand) Krung Thai Bank
20	MF	Hatthaporn Suwan	23 February 1984 (aged 23)		(Thailand) Provincial Electricity
21	FW	Teerasil Dangda	6 June 1988 (aged 19)		(England) Manchester City
22	GK	Narit Taweekul	30 October 1983 (aged 23)		(Thailand) Tobacco Monopoly
23	FW	Pipat Thonkanya	4 January 1979 (aged 28)		(Thailand) BEC Tero Sasana
24	DF	Apichet Puttan	10 August 1978 (aged 28)		(Thailand) Provincial Electricity
28	DF	Natthaphong Samana	29 June 1984 (aged 23)		(Thailand) Krung Thai Bank

=== Iraq ===
Head coach: (Brazil) Jorvan Vieira

No.	Pos.	Player	Date of birth (age)	Caps	Club
1	GK	Ahmed Ali Jaber	2 August 1982 (aged 24)	13	(Iraq) Al-Zawraa
2	DF	Jassim Ghulam	11 March 1981 (aged 26)	15	(Jordan) Al-Wehdat
3	DF	Bassim Abbas	1 July 1982 (aged 25)	47	(Lebanon) Al-Nejmeh
4	MF	Khaldoun Ibrahim	16 July 1987 (aged 19)	8	(Iran) Mes Kerman
5	MF	Nashat Akram	12 September 1984 (aged 22)	60	(Saudi Arabia) Al-Shabab
6	MF	Salih Sadir	21 August 1981 (aged 25)	36	(Lebanon) Al-Ansar
7	FW	Ali Abbas	30 August 1986 (aged 20)	6	(Iraq) Al-Quwa Al-Jawiya
8	MF	Ahmed Abid Ali	1 January 1986 (aged 21)	10	(Iraq) Al-Zawraa
9	FW	Nasser Shakroun	12 March 1984 (aged 23)	18	(Iraq) Al-Talaba
10	FW	Younis Mahmoud (c)	3 February 1983 (aged 24)	55	(Qatar) Al-Gharafa
11	FW	Hawar Mulla Mohammed	1 June 1981 (aged 26)	54	(Cyprus) Apollon Limassol
12	DF	Haidar Abdul-Razzaq	9 June 1982 (aged 25)	24	(Jordan) Al-Hussein Irbid
13	MF	Karrar Jassim	11 June 1987 (aged 20)	13	(Qatar) Al-Wakrah
14	DF	Haidar Abdul-Amir	2 November 1982 (aged 24)	31	(Jordan) Al-Faisaly
15	DF	Ali Rehema	8 August 1985 (aged 21)	31	(Libya) Al-Ahly Tripoli
16	FW	Ahmed Mnajed	13 December 1981 (aged 25)	28	(Lebanon) Al-Ansar
17	FW	Luay Salah	7 February 1982 (aged 25)	14	(Iran) Persepolis
18	FW	Mahdi Karim	10 December 1983 (aged 23)	47	(Libya) Al-Ahly Tripoli
19	MF	Haitham Kadhim	21 July 1983 (aged 23)	26	(Iraq) Erbil
20	DF	Nabeel Abbas	1 January 1986 (aged 21)	0	(Iraq) Al-Najaf
22	GK	Noor Sabri	18 June 1984 (aged 23)	46	(Iran) Mes Kerman
23	GK	Mohammed Gassid	10 December 1986 (aged 20)	2	(Iraq) Al-Shorta
24	MF	Qusay Munir	12 April 1981 (aged 26)	37	(Iraq) Erbil

=== Australia ===
Head coach: (Australia) Graham Arnold

No.	Pos.	Player	Date of birth (age)	Caps	Club
1	GK	Mark Schwarzer	6 October 1972 (aged 34)	46	(England) Middlesbrough
2	DF	Lucas Neill	9 March 1978 (aged 29)	34	(England) West Ham United
3	DF	Patrick Kisnorbo	24 March 1981 (aged 26)	12	(England) Leicester City
4	MF	Tim Cahill	6 December 1979 (aged 27)	23	(England) Everton
5	MF	Jason Culina	5 August 1980 (aged 26)	22	(Netherlands) PSV Eindhoven
6	DF	Michael Beauchamp	8 March 1981 (aged 26)	7	(Germany) 1. FC Nürnberg
7	MF	Brett Emerton	22 February 1979 (aged 28)	57	(England) Blackburn Rovers
8	DF	Luke Wilkshire	2 October 1981 (aged 25)	16	(Netherlands) Twente
9	FW	Mark Viduka (c)	9 October 1975 (aged 31)	39	(England) Newcastle United
10	FW	Harry Kewell	22 September 1978 (aged 28)	24	(England) Liverpool
11	FW	Archie Thompson	23 October 1978 (aged 28)	26	(Australia) Melbourne Victory
12	GK	Brad Jones	3 July 1982 (aged 25)	1	(England) Middlesbrough
13	MF	Vince Grella	5 October 1979 (aged 27)	27	(Italy) Torino
14	MF	Brett Holman	27 March 1984 (aged 23)	7	(Netherlands) Nijmegen
15	FW	John Aloisi	5 February 1976 (aged 31)	50	(Spain) Alavés
16	DF	Michael Thwaite	2 May 1983 (aged 24)	6	(Poland) Wisła Kraków
17	MF	Carl Valeri	14 August 1984 (aged 22)	2	(Italy) Grosseto
18	GK	Michael Petkovic	16 July 1976 (aged 30)	5	(Turkey) Sivasspor
19	MF	Nick Carle	23 November 1981 (aged 25)	4	(Turkey) Gençlerbirliği
20	MF	David Carney	30 November 1983 (aged 23)	2	(Australia) Sydney
21	MF	Mile Sterjovski	27 May 1979 (aged 28)	32	(Switzerland) Basel
22	DF	Mark Milligan	4 August 1985 (aged 21)	3	(Australia) Sydney
23	MF	Mark Bresciano	11 February 1980 (aged 27)	33	(Italy) Palermo

=== Oman ===
Head coach: (Argentina) Gabriel Calderón

No.	Pos.	Player	Date of birth (age)	Caps	Club
1	GK	Sulaiman Al-Mazroui	13 September 1972 (aged 34)		(Oman) Muscat
2	DF	Mohammed Rabia (c)	10 May 1981 (aged 26)		(Qatar) Al-Sadd
3	DF	Juma Al-Wahaibi	2 March 1980 (aged 27)		(Kuwait) Tadamon
4	DF	Said Al-Shoon	28 August 1983 (aged 23)		(Qatar) Umm-Salal
5	DF	Fahad Ba Masilah	8 July 1986 (aged 20)		(Oman) Dhofar
6	DF	Issam Fayel	14 August 1984 (aged 22)		(Oman) Sur
7	MF	Sultan Al-Touqi	2 January 1984 (aged 23)		(Kuwait) Al-Salmiya
8	MF	Badar Al-Maimani	16 July 1984 (aged 22)		(Qatar) Al-Ahly
9	FW	Hashim Saleh	15 October 1981 (aged 25)		(Qatar) Al-Shamal
10	MF	Fawzi Bashir	6 May 1984 (aged 23)		(Kuwait) Qadsia
11	FW	Yousuf Shaaban	4 November 1982 (aged 24)		(Oman) Dhofar
12	MF	Ahmed Kano	23 February 1985 (aged 22)		(Qatar) Al Rayyan
13	FW	Mohammed Al-Ghassani	1 April 1985 (aged 22)		(Oman) Al-Suwaiq
14	FW	Younis Al-Mushaifri	24 October 1981 (aged 25)		(Kuwait) Kazma
15	FW	Ismail Al-Ajmi	9 June 1984 (aged 23)		(Qatar) Umm-Salal
17	DF	Hassan Mudhafar	26 June 1980 (aged 27)		(Qatar) Al-Ahly Doha
18	DF	Hamed Al-Balushi	8 January 1984 (aged 23)		(Oman) Muscat
20	FW	Amad Al-Hosni	18 July 1984 (aged 22)		Qatar
21	MF	Ahmed Hadid	18 July 1984 (aged 22)		(Qatar) Al-Shamal
24	MF	Younis Mubarak	12 March 1987 (aged 20)		(Oman) Al-Oruba
25	DF	Sulaiman Al-Shukaili	29 October 1984 (aged 22)		(Kuwait) Al-Salmiya
26	GK	Ali Al-Habsi	30 December 1981 (aged 25)		(England) Bolton Wanderers
28	FW	Hussain Al-Hadhri	21 May 1990 (aged 17)		(Oman) Dhofar

== Group B ==
=== Vietnam ===
Head coach: (Austria) Alfred Riedl

No.	Pos.	Player	Date of birth (age)	Caps	Club
1	GK	Bùi Quang Huy	24 July 1982 (aged 24)		(Vietnam) Đạm Phú Mỹ Nam Định
2	DF	Phùng Văn Nhiên	23 November 1982 (aged 24)		(Vietnam) Đạm Phú Mỹ Nam Định
3	DF	Nguyễn Huy Hoàng	4 January 1981 (aged 26)		(Vietnam) TCDK Sông Lam Nghệ An
4	DF	Đoàn Việt Cường	13 June 1985 (aged 22)		(Vietnam) TĐCS Đồng Tháp
6	DF	Phạm Hùng Dũng	28 September 1978 (aged 28)		(Vietnam) SHB Đà Nẵng
7	DF	Vũ Như Thành	28 August 1981 (aged 25)		(Vietnam) Becamex Bình Dương
8	MF	Đồng Huy Thái	18 January 1985 (aged 22)		(Vietnam) Halida Thanh Hóa
9	FW	Lê Công Vinh	10 December 1985 (aged 21)		(Vietnam) TCDK Sông Lam Nghệ An
10	FW	Huỳnh Phúc Hiệp	12 April 1988 (aged 19)		(Vietnam) Giày Thành Công Tiền Giang
11	MF	Phùng Công Minh	8 March 1985 (aged 22)		(Vietnam) Becamex Bình Dương
12	MF	Nguyễn Minh Phương (c)	5 July 1980 (aged 27)		(Vietnam) Đồng Tâm Long An
13	MF	Mai Tiến Thành	16 March 1986 (aged 21)		(Vietnam) Halida Thanh Hóa
14	MF	Lê Tấn Tài	26 March 1984 (aged 23)		(Vietnam) Khatoco Khánh Hòa
15	MF	Nguyễn Minh Chuyên	9 November 1985 (aged 21)		(Vietnam) Cảng Sài Gòn
16	DF	Huỳnh Quang Thanh	10 October 1984 (aged 22)		(Vietnam) Becamex Bình Dương
17	MF	Nguyễn Vũ Phong	6 February 1985 (aged 22)		(Vietnam) Becamex Bình Dương
18	FW	Phan Thanh Bình	1 November 1986 (aged 20)		(Vietnam) TĐCS Đồng Tháp
19	MF	Phan Văn Tài Em	23 April 1982 (aged 25)		(Vietnam) Đồng Tâm Long An
20	MF	Trần Đức Dương	2 May 1983 (aged 24)		(Vietnam) Đạm Phú Mỹ Nam Định
21	FW	Nguyễn Anh Đức	25 January 1985 (aged 22)		(Vietnam) Becamex Bình Dương
22	GK	Dương Hồng Sơn	20 November 1982 (aged 24)		(Vietnam) TCDK Sông Lam Nghệ An
23	GK	Trần Đức Cường	20 May 1985 (aged 22)		(Vietnam) SHB Đà Nẵng
29	DF	Châu Phong Hòa	1 January 1985 (aged 22)		(Vietnam) TĐCS Đồng Tháp

=== United Arab Emirates ===
Head coach: (France) Bruno Metsu

No.	Pos.	Player	Date of birth (age)	Caps	Club
1	GK	Majed Naser	1 April 1984 (aged 23)		(United Arab Emirates) Al Wasl
2	MF	Abdulrahim Jumaa (c)	23 May 1979 (aged 28)		(United Arab Emirates) Al-Wahda
3	DF	Mohammad Khamis	11 March 1976 (aged 31)		(United Arab Emirates) Al-Nasr
4	DF	Ali Msarri	9 October 1981 (aged 25)		(United Arab Emirates) Al Ain
5	MF	Issa Ali	2 April 1981 (aged 26)		(United Arab Emirates) Al Wasl
6	DF	Rashid Abdulrahman	20 October 1975 (aged 31)		(United Arab Emirates) Al-Jazira
7	MF	Khalid Darwish	17 October 1979 (aged 27)		(United Arab Emirates) Al Wasl
8	DF	Haider Alo Ali	25 December 1979 (aged 27)		(United Arab Emirates) Al-Wahda
9	MF	Nawaf Mubarak	31 August 1981 (aged 25)		(United Arab Emirates) Sharjah
10	FW	Ismail Matar	7 April 1983 (aged 24)		(United Arab Emirates) Al-Wahda
11	FW	Faisal Khalil	4 December 1982 (aged 24)		(United Arab Emirates) Al-Ahli
12	GK	Waleed Salem	28 October 1980 (aged 26)		(United Arab Emirates) Al-Ain
13	MF	Ahmed Dada	28 December 1988 (aged 18)		(United Arab Emirates) Al-Jazira
14	DF	Basheer Saeed	28 June 1981 (aged 26)		(United Arab Emirates) Al-Wahda
15	FW	Mohammad Al Shehhi	28 March 1988 (aged 19)		(United Arab Emirates) Al-Wahda
17	DF	Youssef Jabber	25 February 1985 (aged 22)		(United Arab Emirates) Bani Yas
18	MF	Amer Mubarak	28 December 1987 (aged 19)		(United Arab Emirates) Al-Nasr
19	FW	Saeed Al Kass	20 February 1976 (aged 31)		(United Arab Emirates) Sharjah
20	MF	Hilal Saeed	12 May 1977 (aged 30)		(United Arab Emirates) Al Ain
21	DF	Humaid Fakher	3 November 1978 (aged 28)		(United Arab Emirates) Al-Ain
22	DF	Mohammed Qassim	9 November 1981 (aged 25)		(United Arab Emirates) Al-Ahli
23	DF	Saif Mohammed	15 September 1983 (aged 23)		(United Arab Emirates) Al-Shaab
28	GK	Ismail Rabee	11 January 1983 (aged 24)		(United Arab Emirates) Al-Shabab

=== Japan ===
Head coach: (Bosnia and Herzegovina) Ivica Osim

No.	Pos.	Player	Date of birth (age)	Caps	Club
1	GK	Yoshikatsu Kawaguchi (c)	15 August 1975 (aged 31)	100	(Japan) Júbilo Iwata
2	MF	Yasuyuki Konno	25 January 1983 (aged 24)	8	(Japan) Tokyo
3	DF	Yūichi Komano	25 June 1981 (aged 26)	18	(Japan) Sanfrecce Hiroshima
5	DF	Keisuke Tsuboi	16 September 1979 (aged 27)	40	(Japan) Urawa Red Diamonds
6	MF	Yuki Abe	6 September 1981 (aged 25)	16	(Japan) Urawa Red Diamonds
7	MF	Yasuhito Endō	28 January 1980 (aged 27)	47	(Japan) Gamba Osaka
8	MF	Naotake Hanyu	22 December 1980 (aged 26)	7	(Japan) JEF United Ichihara Chiba
9	MF	Satoru Yamagishi	3 May 1983 (aged 24)	4	(Japan) JEF United Ichihara Chiba
10	MF	Shunsuke Nakamura	24 June 1978 (aged 29)	65	(Scotland) Celtic
11	FW	Hisato Satō	12 March 1982 (aged 25)	13	(Japan) Sanfrecce Hiroshima
12	FW	Seiichiro Maki	7 August 1980 (aged 26)	20	(Japan) JEF United Ichihara Chiba
13	MF	Keita Suzuki	8 July 1981 (aged 25)	10	(Japan) Urawa Red Diamonds
14	MF	Kengo Nakamura	31 October 1980 (aged 26)	6	(Japan) Kawasaki Frontale
15	MF	Koki Mizuno	6 September 1985 (aged 21)	2	(Japan) JEF United Ichihara Chiba
18	GK	Seigo Narazaki	11 April 1976 (aged 31)	51	(Japan) Nagoya Grampus Eight
19	FW	Naohiro Takahara	4 June 1979 (aged 28)	47	(Germany) Eintracht Frankfurt
20	FW	Kisho Yano	5 April 1984 (aged 23)	2	(Japan) Albirex Niigata
21	DF	Akira Kaji	13 January 1980 (aged 27)	50	(Japan) Gamba Osaka
22	DF	Yuji Nakazawa	25 February 1978 (aged 29)	56	(Japan) Yokohama F. Marinos
23	GK	Eiji Kawashima	20 March 1983 (aged 24)	0	(Japan) Kawasaki Frontale
24	MF	Hideo Hashimoto	21 May 1979 (aged 28)	1	(Japan) Gamba Osaka
28	MF	Yoshiaki Ota	11 June 1983 (aged 24)	0	(Japan) Júbilo Iwata
29	DF	Masahiko Inoha *	28 August 1985 (aged 21)	0	(Japan) Tokyo

* Replaced Ryūji Bando who pulled out with injury.

=== Qatar ===
Head coach: (Bosnia and Herzegovina) Džemaludin Mušović

No.	Pos.	Player	Date of birth (age)	Caps	Club
1	GK	Mohamed Saqr	17 May 1981 (aged 26)		(Qatar) Al-Sadd
2	DF	Mesaad Al-Hamad	11 February 1986 (aged 21)		(Qatar) Al-Sadd
3	DF	Bilal Mohammed	2 June 1986 (aged 21)		(Qatar) Al-Gharafa
4	DF	Ibrahim Al-Ghanim	27 June 1983 (aged 24)		(Qatar) Al-Arabi
5	MF	Majdi Siddiq	3 September 1985 (aged 21)		(Qatar) Al-Khor
6	DF	Meshal Mubarak	25 February 1982 (aged 25)		Qatar SC
7	DF	Ali Nasser	16 May 1986 (aged 21)		(Qatar) Al-Sadd
8	DF	Saad Al-Shammari (c)	6 August 1980 (aged 26)		(Qatar) Al-Gharafa
9	FW	Sayyed Ali Bechir	6 September 1982 (aged 24)		(Qatar) Al-Arabi
10	MF	Hussein Yasser	9 January 1984 (aged 23)		(Qatar) Al-Rayyan
11	DF	Ali Afif	20 January 1988 (aged 19)		(Qatar) Al-Sadd
12	FW	Magid Mohamed	1 October 1985 (aged 21)		(Qatar) Al-Sadd
13	DF	Mustafa Abdi	2 January 1984 (aged 23)		(Qatar) Al Gharafa
14	MF	Younes Ali	3 January 1983 (aged 24)		(Qatar) Al-Ahli
15	MF	Talal Al-Bloushi	22 May 1986 (aged 21)		(Qatar) Al-Sadd
16	FW	Mohammed Gholam	8 November 1980 (aged 26)		(Qatar) Al-Sadd
17	MF	Wesam Rizik	5 February 1981 (aged 26)		(Qatar) Al-Sadd
18	MF	Waleed Jassem	2 August 1986 (aged 20)		(Qatar) Al-Rayyan
19	DF	Ibrahim Majid	12 May 1990 (aged 17)		(Qatar) Al-Sadd
20	DF	Adel Lamy	13 November 1985 (aged 21)		(Qatar) Al-Rayyan
21	DF	Abdulla Koni	19 July 1979 (aged 27)		(Qatar) Al-Sadd
23	FW	Sebastián Soria	8 November 1983 (aged 23)		Qatar SC
24	GK	Rajab Hamza	16 October 1986 (aged 20)		(Qatar) Al-Ahli

== Group C ==
=== Malaysia ===
Head coach: (Malaysia) Norizan Bakar

No.	Pos.	Player	Date of birth (age)	Caps	Club
1	GK	Azizon Abdul Kadir	10 June 1980 (aged 27)		(Malaysia) Negeri Sembilan
2	DF	Hamzani Omar	30 September 1978 (aged 28)		(Malaysia) Johor Pasir Gudang
3	DF	Fauzi Nan	2 January 1980 (aged 27)		(Malaysia) Perlis
4	DF	Nazrulerwan Makmor	4 May 1980 (aged 27)		(Malaysia) PKNS
5	DF	Norhafiz Zamani	15 July 1981 (aged 25)		(Malaysia) Pahang
6	DF	V. Thirumurugan	9 January 1983 (aged 24)		(Malaysia) Kedah
7	DF	Kaironnisam Sahabudin (c)	10 May 1979 (aged 28)		(Malaysia) UPB-MyTeam
8	FW	Safee Sali	29 January 1984 (aged 23)		(Malaysia) Selangor
9	MF	Eddy Helmi	8 December 1979 (aged 27)		(Malaysia) Johor
10	MF	Hardi Jaafar	30 May 1979 (aged 28)		(Malaysia) Melaka
11	FW	Nor Farhan Muhammad	7 June 1984 (aged 23)		(Malaysia) Terengganu
12	MF	Shukor Adan	24 September 1979 (aged 27)		(Malaysia) Selangor
13	FW	Indra Putra	2 September 1981 (aged 25)		(Malaysia) Pahang
14	FW	Akmal Rizal	15 December 1981 (aged 25)		(Malaysia) Selangor
15	MF	Shahrulnizam Mustapa	2 April 1981 (aged 26)		(Malaysia) Perak
16	MF	Fauzi Saari	30 April 1982 (aged 25)		(Malaysia) Kedah
17	MF	K. Nanthakumar	13 October 1977 (aged 29)		(Malaysia) Perak
18	MF	Fadzli Saari	1 January 1983 (aged 24)		(Malaysia) Selangor
19	DF	Rosdi Talib	11 January 1976 (aged 31)		(Malaysia) Pahang
20	FW	Hairuddin Omar	29 September 1979 (aged 27)		(Malaysia) Pahang
21	GK	Suffian Rahman	23 February 1978 (aged 29)		(Malaysia) Melaka
22	MF	Ivan Yusoff	13 May 1982 (aged 25)		(Malaysia) Kuala Lumpur
23	DF	Aidil Zafuan	22 October 1987 (aged 19)		(Malaysia) Negeri Sembilan

=== China ===
Head coach: (China) Zhu Guanghu

No.	Pos.	Player	Date of birth (age)	Caps	Club
1	GK	Li Leilei	30 June 1977 (aged 30)	21	(China) Shandong Luneng Taishan
2	DF	Du Wei	9 February 1982 (aged 25)	21	(China) Shanghai Shenhua
3	DF	Sun Xiang	15 January 1982 (aged 25)	27	(China) Shanghai Shenhua
4	DF	Zhang Yaokun	17 April 1981 (aged 26)	27	(China) Dalian Shide
5	DF	Li Weifeng	1 December 1978 (aged 28)	93	(China) Shanghai Shenhua
6	MF	Shao Jiayi	10 April 1980 (aged 27)	33	(Germany) Energie Cottbus
7	DF	Sun Jihai	30 September 1977 (aged 29)	66	(England) Manchester City
8	MF	Li Tie	18 September 1977 (aged 29)	89	(England) Sheffield United
9	FW	Han Peng	13 September 1983 (aged 23)	10	(China) Shandong Luneng Taishan
10	MF	Zheng Zhi (c)	20 August 1980 (aged 26)	37	(China) Shandong Luneng Taishan
11	FW	Dong Fangzhuo	23 January 1985 (aged 22)	11	(England) Manchester United
12	MF	Zhao Xuri	3 December 1985 (aged 21)	18	(China) Dalian Shide
13	DF	Zhang Shuai	20 July 1981 (aged 25)	2	(China) Beijing Guoan
14	DF	Zhu Ting	15 July 1985 (aged 21)	2	(China) Dalian Shide
15	MF	Wang Dong	10 September 1981 (aged 25)	10	(China) Changchun Yatai
16	DF	Ji Mingyi	15 December 1980 (aged 26)	20	(China) Dalian Shide
18	MF	Zhou Haibin	19 July 1985 (aged 21)	19	(China) Shandong Luneng Taishan
19	MF	Zheng Bin	4 July 1977 (aged 30)	29	(China) Wuhan Optics Valley
20	FW	Mao Jianqing	8 August 1986 (aged 20)	3	(China) Shanghai Shenhua
21	FW	Wang Peng	16 June 1978 (aged 29)	15	(China) Dalian Shide
22	GK	Yang Jun	10 June 1981 (aged 26)	2	(China) Tianjin Teda
23	DF	Cao Yang	15 December 1981 (aged 25)	19	(China) Tianjin Teda
30	GK	Zong Lei	26 July 1981 (aged 25)	1	(China) Changchun Yatai

=== Iran ===
Head coach: (Iran) Amir Ghalenoei

No.	Pos.	Player	Date of birth (age)	Caps	Club
1	GK	Hassan Roudbarian	6 July 1978 (aged 29)	14	(Iran) Persepolis
2	MF	Mehdi Mahdavikia (c)	24 July 1977 (aged 29)	107	(Germany) Eintracht Frankfurt
3	DF	Amir Hossein Sadeghi	6 September 1981 (aged 25)	9	(Iran) Esteghlal
4	MF	Andranik Teymourian	6 March 1983 (aged 24)	19	(England) Bolton Wanderers
5	DF	Rahman Rezaei	20 February 1975 (aged 32)	51	(Italy) Livorno
6	MF	Javad Nekounam	7 September 1980 (aged 26)	82	(Spain) Osasuna
7	MF	Ferydoon Zandi	26 April 1979 (aged 28)	14	(Cyprus) Apollon Limassol
8	MF	Ali Karimi	8 November 1978 (aged 28)	99	(Germany) Bayern Munich
9	FW	Vahid Hashemian	21 July 1976 (aged 30)	36	(Germany) Hannover 96
10	FW	Rasoul Khatibi	22 September 1978 (aged 28)	21	(United Arab Emirates) Emirates
11	MF	Mehrzad Madanchi	10 January 1985 (aged 22)	16	(Iran) Persepolis
12	DF	Jalal Hosseini	3 February 1982 (aged 25)	7	(Iran) Saipa
13	DF	Hossein Kaebi	23 September 1985 (aged 21)	50	(Iran) Persepolis
14	MF	Iman Mobali	3 November 1982 (aged 24)	38	(United Arab Emirates) Al-Shabab
15	DF	Hadi Aghily	15 January 1981 (aged 26)	4	(Iran) Sepahan
16	FW	Reza Enayati	23 September 1976 (aged 30)	24	(United Arab Emirates) Emirates
17	MF	Javad Kazemian	23 April 1981 (aged 26)	30	(United Arab Emirates) Al-Shabab
18	MF	Mehdi Rajabzadeh	21 March 1978 (aged 29)	14	(Iran) Zob Ahan
19	MF	Ebrahim Sadeghi	4 February 1979 (aged 28)	4	(Iran) Saipa
20	DF	Mohammad Nosrati	10 January 1982 (aged 25)	55	(Iran) Persepolis
22	GK	Vahid Talebloo	26 May 1982 (aged 25)	4	(Iran) Esteghlal
24	MF	Masoud Shojaei	19 June 1984 (aged 23)	8	(United Arab Emirates) Sharjah
30	GK	Mehdi Rahmati	2 February 1983 (aged 24)	10	(Iran) Esteghlal

=== Uzbekistan ===
Head coach: (Uzbekistan) Rauf Inileev

No.	Pos.	Player	Date of birth (age)	Caps	Club
1	GK	Pavel Bugalo	21 August 1974 (aged 32)		(Uzbekistan) Quruvchi Tashkent
2	DF	Hayrulla Karimov	22 April 1978 (aged 29)		(Uzbekistan) Mash'al Mubarek
3	DF	Botir Qoraev	8 April 1980 (aged 27)		(Uzbekistan) Mash'al Mubarek
4	DF	Aziz Ibrahimov	21 July 1986 (aged 20)		(Slovakia) Slovan Bratislava
6	DF	Anzur Ismailov	21 April 1985 (aged 22)		(Uzbekistan) Pakhtakor Tashkent
7	MF	Azizbek Haydarov	8 July 1985 (aged 21)		(Uzbekistan) Lokomotiv Tashkent
8	MF	Server Djeparov	3 October 1982 (aged 24)		(Uzbekistan) Pakhtakor Tashkent
9	FW	Pavel Solomin	15 June 1982 (aged 25)		(Russia) Saturn Moscow Oblast
10	FW	Ulugbek Bakayev	28 November 1978 (aged 28)		(Kazakhstan) Tobol
11	FW	Marat Bikmaev	1 January 1986 (aged 21)		(Russia) Rubin Kazan
12	GK	Ignatiy Nesterov	20 June 1983 (aged 24)		(Uzbekistan) Pakhtakor Tashkent
13	MF	Hikmat Hashimov	12 November 1979 (aged 27)		(Uzbekistan) Nasaf Qarshi
15	FW	Alexander Geynrikh	6 October 1984 (aged 22)		(Uzbekistan) Pakhtakor Tashkent
16	FW	Maksim Shatskikh (c)	30 August 1978 (aged 28)		(Ukraine) Dynamo Kyiv
17	DF	Aleksey Nikolaev	5 September 1979 (aged 27)		(Kazakhstan) Aktobe
18	MF	Timur Kapadze	5 September 1981 (aged 25)		(Uzbekistan) Pakhtakor Tashkent
19	DF	Islom Inomov	30 May 1984 (aged 23)		(Uzbekistan) Pakhtakor Tashkent
20	MF	Ildar Magdeev	11 April 1984 (aged 23)		(Uzbekistan) Pakhtakor Tashkent
21	GK	Gayratjon Hasanov	12 January 1983 (aged 24)		(Uzbekistan) Neftchy Farg'ona
22	MF	Ikboljon Akramov	10 October 1983 (aged 23)		(Uzbekistan) Neftchy Farg'ona
23	DF	Vitaliy Denisov	23 February 1987 (aged 20)		(Ukraine) Dnipro Dnipropetrovsk
26	MF	Victor Karpenko	7 September 1977 (aged 29)		(Uzbekistan) Quruvchi Tashkent
28	DF	Anvar Gafurov *	14 May 1982 (aged 25)		(Uzbekistan) Mash'al Mubarek

* Replaced Asror Aliqulov who pulled out with injury.

== Group D ==
=== Indonesia ===
Head coach: (Bulgaria) Ivan Kolev

No.	Pos.	Player	Date of birth (age)	Caps	Club
1	GK	Yandri Pitoy	15 January 1981 (aged 26)	13	(Indonesia) Persipura Jayapura
2	MF	Muhammad Ridwan	8 July 1980 (aged 26)	9	(Indonesia) PSIS Semarang
3	DF	Erol Iba	6 August 1979 (aged 27)	4	(Indonesia) Persik Kediri
4	DF	Ricardo Salampessy	18 February 1984 (aged 23)	15	(Indonesia) Persipura Jayapura
5	DF	Maman Abdurahman	12 May 1982 (aged 25)	9	(Indonesia) PSIS Semarang
6	DF	Charis Yulianto	11 July 1978 (aged 28)	16	(Indonesia) Sriwijaya
7	MF	Eka Ramdani	18 June 1984 (aged 23)	11	(Indonesia) Persib Bandung
8	FW	Elie Aiboy	20 April 1979 (aged 28)	27	(Indonesia) Arema Malang
9	DF	Mahyadi Panggabean	8 January 1982 (aged 25)	8	(Indonesia) PSMS Medan
11	MF	Ponaryo Astaman (c)	25 September 1979 (aged 27)	40	(Indonesia) Arema Malang
12	GK	Ferry Rotinsulu	28 December 1982 (aged 24)	0	(Indonesia) Sriwijaya
13	FW	Budi Sudarsono	19 September 1979 (aged 27)	33	(Indonesia) Persik Kediri
14	DF	Ismed Sofyan	28 August 1979 (aged 27)	31	(Indonesia) Persija Jakarta
15	MF	Firman Utina	15 December 1981 (aged 25)	11	(Indonesia) Persita Tangerang
16	MF	Syamsul Chaeruddin	9 February 1983 (aged 24)	21	(Indonesia) PSM Makassar
17	FW	Atep Rizal	5 June 1985 (aged 22)	6	(Indonesia) Persija Jakarta
19	FW	Zaenal Arief	3 January 1981 (aged 26)	12	(Indonesia) Persib Bandung
20	FW	Bambang Pamungkas	10 June 1980 (aged 27)	38	(Indonesia) Persija Jakarta
21	DF	Harry Saputra	12 June 1981 (aged 26)	18	(Indonesia) Persis Solo
22	DF	Supardi Nasir	9 April 1983 (aged 24)	5	(Indonesia) PSMS Medan
23	GK	Markus Horison	14 March 1981 (aged 26)	2	(Indonesia) PSMS Medan
27	FW	Ahmad Amiruddin	3 October 1982 (aged 24)	2	(Indonesia) PSM Makassar
28	DF	Achmad Jufriyanto	7 February 1987 (aged 20)	0	(Indonesia) Arema Malang

=== Bahrain ===
Head coach: (Czech Republic) Milan Máčala

No.	Pos.	Player	Date of birth (age)	Caps	Club
1	GK	Ali Al-Thani	16 August 1971 (aged 35)		(Bahrain) Muharraq Club
2	DF	Mohamed Husain	31 July 1980 (aged 26)		(Kuwait) Kadhima Club
3	DF	Abdulla Al-Marzooqi	12 December 1980 (aged 26)		(Saudi Arabia) Al-Ta'ai Club
7	MF	Sayed Mahmood Jalal	5 November 1980 (aged 26)		Qatar Sports Club
8	MF	Rashid Al-Dosari	24 March 1980 (aged 27)		(Bahrain) Muharraq Club
9	FW	Husain Ali	31 December 1981 (aged 25)		(Qatar) Umm-Salal Sports Club
10	MF	Mohamed Salmeen	4 November 1980 (aged 26)		(Bahrain) Muharraq Club
11	FW	Ismail Abdullatif	11 September 1986 (aged 20)		(Bahrain) Al-Hala
12	MF	Abdulla Baba Fatadi	2 November 1985 (aged 21)		(Bahrain) Muharraq Club
13	MF	Talal Yousef (c)	24 February 1975 (aged 32)		Al Kuwait Kaifan
14	DF	Salman Isa	11 July 1977 (aged 29)		(Qatar) Al-Arabi Sports Club
15	DF	Abdullah Omar	1 January 1987 (aged 20)		(Bahrain) Muharraq Club
16	DF	Sayed Mohamed Adnan	5 February 1983 (aged 24)		(Qatar) Al-Khor Sports Club
17	DF	Hussain Ali Baba	11 February 1982 (aged 25)		Al Kuwait Kaifan
18	MF	Hussain Salman	20 December 1982 (aged 24)		(Bahrain) Muharraq Club
21	GK	Abdulrahman Abdulkarim	13 May 1980 (aged 27)		(Bahrain) Al-Najma SC
25	MF	Faouzi Mubarak Aaish	27 February 1985 (aged 22)		(Bahrain) Muharraq Club
26	FW	Jaycee John Okwunwanne	8 October 1985 (aged 21)		(Bahrain) Muharraq Club
27	MF	Mahmood Abdulrahman	22 November 1984 (aged 22)		(Bahrain) Muharraq Club
28	GK	Abbas Ahmed Khamis	13 June 1983 (aged 24)		(Bahrain) Sitra Club
29	MF	Mohamed Hubail	23 June 1981 (aged 26)		(Bahrain) Al-Ahli
30	FW	A'ala Hubail	25 June 1982 (aged 25)		(Qatar) Al-Gharafa

=== South Korea ===
Head coach: (Netherlands) Pim Verbeek

No.	Pos.	Player	Date of birth (age)	Caps	Club
1	GK	Lee Woon-jae (c)	26 April 1973 (aged 34)	102	(South Korea) Suwon Samsung Bluewings
2	DF	Song Chong-gug	20 February 1979 (aged 28)	58	(South Korea) Suwon Samsung Bluewings
3	DF	Kim Jin-kyu	16 February 1985 (aged 22)	31	(South Korea) FC Seoul
4	DF	Kim Dong-jin	29 January 1982 (aged 25)	44	(Russia) Zenit Saint Petersburg
6	MF	Lee Ho	22 October 1984 (aged 22)	20	(Russia) Zenit Saint Petersburg
7	FW	Choi Sung-kuk	25 February 1981 (aged 26)	15	(South Korea) Seongnam Ilhwa Chunma
8	MF	Kim Do-heon	14 July 1982 (aged 24)	40	(South Korea) Seongnam Ilhwa Chunma
9	FW	Cho Jae-jin	9 July 1981 (aged 25)	30	(Japan) Shimizu S-Pulse
10	FW	Lee Chun-soo	9 July 1981 (aged 25)	71	(South Korea) Ulsan Hyundai Horangi
11	FW	Lee Keun-ho	11 April 1985 (aged 22)	0	(South Korea) Daegu FC
12	FW	Lee Dong-gook	29 April 1979 (aged 28)	64	(England) Middlesbrough
13	DF	Kim Chi-gon	29 July 1983 (aged 23)	4	(South Korea) FC Seoul
14	MF	Kim Sang-sik	17 December 1976 (aged 30)	51	(South Korea) Seongnam Ilhwa Chunma
15	DF	Kim Chi-woo	11 November 1983 (aged 23)	4	(South Korea) Jeonnam Dragons
16	DF	Oh Beom-seok	9 July 1984 (aged 22)	6	(South Korea) Pohang Steelers
17	MF	Kim Jung-woo	9 May 1982 (aged 25)	27	(Japan) Nagoya Grampus
18	FW	Woo Sung-yong	18 August 1973 (aged 33)	10	(South Korea) Ulsan Hyundai Horangi
19	FW	Yeom Ki-hun	30 March 1983 (aged 24)	4	(South Korea) Jeonbuk Hyundai Motors
20	MF	Son Dae-ho	11 September 1981 (aged 25)	1	(South Korea) Seongnam Ilhwa Chunma
21	GK	Kim Yong-dae	11 October 1979 (aged 27)	17	(South Korea) Seongnam Ilhwa Chunma
22	DF	Kang Min-soo	14 February 1986 (aged 21)	1	(South Korea) Jeonnam Dragons
23	GK	Jung Sung-ryong	4 January 1985 (aged 22)	0	(South Korea) Pohang Steelers
27	MF	Oh Jang-eun	24 July 1985 (aged 21)	2	(South Korea) Ulsan Hyundai Horangi

=== Saudi Arabia ===
Head coach: (Brazil) Hélio dos Anjos

No.	Pos.	Player	Date of birth (age)	Caps	Club
1	GK	Yasser Al-Mosailem	27 February 1984 (aged 23)		(Saudi Arabia) Al-Ahli
2	DF	Ibrahim Hazzazi	22 November 1984 (aged 22)		(Saudi Arabia) Al Ahli
3	DF	Osama Hawsawi	31 March 1984 (aged 23)		(Saudi Arabia) Al Wehda
5	DF	Majed Al-Amri	15 September 1985 (aged 21)		(Saudi Arabia) Al-Ittifaq
6	MF	Omar Al-Ghamdi	11 April 1979 (aged 28)		(Saudi Arabia) Al Hilal
7	DF	Kamel Al-Mousa	29 August 1982 (aged 24)		(Saudi Arabia) Al Wehda
9	FW	Malek Mouath	10 August 1981 (aged 25)		(Saudi Arabia) Al Ahli
11	FW	Saad Al-Harthi	3 February 1984 (aged 23)		(Saudi Arabia) Al Nassr
12	DF	Talal Al-Khaibari	9 January 1977 (aged 30)		(Saudi Arabia) Al Wehda
13	MF	Ahmed Darwish	29 October 1984 (aged 22)		(Saudi Arabia) Al Ahli
14	MF	Saud Kariri	8 July 1980 (aged 26)		(Saudi Arabia) Al-Ittihad
15	DF	Ahmed Al-Bahri	18 September 1980 (aged 26)		(Saudi Arabia) Al Nassr
16	MF	Khaled Aziz	14 July 1981 (aged 25)		(Saudi Arabia) Al Hilal
17	MF	Taisir Al-Jassim	25 July 1984 (aged 22)		(Saudi Arabia) Al Ahli
18	MF	Abdulrahman Al-Qahtani	22 May 1983 (aged 24)		(Saudi Arabia) Al-Ittihad
19	DF	Walid Jahdali	1 June 1982 (aged 25)		(Saudi Arabia) Al Ahli
20	FW	Yasser Al-Qahtani (c)	10 October 1982 (aged 24)		(Saudi Arabia) Al Hilal
21	GK	Assaf Al-Qarni	2 April 1984 (aged 23)		(Saudi Arabia) Al Wehda
22	GK	Waleed Abdullah	19 April 1986 (aged 21)		(Saudi Arabia) Al-Shabab Riyadh
23	FW	Nasser Al-Shamrani	23 November 1983 (aged 23)		(Saudi Arabia) Al Wehda
25	DF	Redha Tukar	29 November 1975 (aged 31)		(Saudi Arabia) Al-Ittihad
28	MF	Abdoh Otaif	2 April 1984 (aged 23)		(Saudi Arabia) Al-Shabab Riyadh
30	MF	Ahmed Al-Mousa	27 January 1981 (aged 26)		(Saudi Arabia) Al Wehda

== Player statistics ==
=== By age ===
==== Outfield players ====
- Oldest: (Thailand) Tawan Sripan (35 years, 206 days)
- Youngest: (Oman) Hussain Al-Hadhri (17 years, 47 days)

==== Goalkeepers ====
- Oldest: (Bahrain) Ali Hassan Al-Thani (35 years, 325 days)
- Youngest: (Saudi Arabia) Waleed Abdullah (21 years, 79 days)

==== Captains ====
- Oldest: (Thailand) Tawan Sripan (35 years, 206 days)
- Youngest: (Iraq) Younis Mahmoud (24 years, 154 days)

==== Coaches ====
- Oldest: (Bosnia and Herzegovina) Ivica Osim (Japan) (66 years, 62 days)
- Youngest: (Australia) Graham Arnold (42 years, 338 days)

=== By club ===
==== Clubs with five or more players ====
Players	Club
11	(Qatar) Al-Sadd
9	(Bahrain) Muharraq Club
7	(Uzbekistan) Pakhtakor Tashkent
6	(Saudi Arabia) Al Ahli, (Saudi Arabia) Al Wehda
5	(China) Dalian Shide, (South Korea) Seongnam Ilhwa Chunma, (Qatar) Al-Gharrafa, (Vietnam) Becamex Bình Dương, (United Arab Emirates) Al Wahda

==== Club nationality ====
Players	Asian clubs
38	Qatar
28	United Arab Emirates
26	Vietnam
25	Saudi Arabia
23	Indonesia, Japan, Malaysia
19	China
18	(South Korea) Korea Republic
16	Uzbekistan
15	Thailand
14	Iran
13	Bahrain
8	Iraq, Kuwait, Oman
3	Australia, Jordan, Lebanon
2	Kazakhstan, Singapore

Players	Clubs outside Asia
17	England
6	Germany
4	Russia
3	Italy, Netherlands
2	Cyprus, Libya, Spain, Turkey, Ukraine
1	Poland, Scotland, Serbia, Switzerland

==== Club federation ====
Players	Federation
317†	AFC
45	UEFA
2	CAF

==== Players in home leagues ====
Team	No. of players in home leagues
Australia	3
Bahrain	13
China	19
Indonesia	23
Iran	11
Iraq	8
Japan	21
Malaysia	23
Oman	8
Qatar	23
Saudi Arabia	23
South Korea	18
Thailand	15
United Arab Emirates	23
Uzbekistan	16
Vietnam	23
