= 2007 AFC Asian Cup Group B =

Football tournament group stage

Group B was one of four groups of the 2007 AFC Asian Cup. The group's first round of matches began on 8 July and its last matches were played on 16 July. All matches were played in Vietnam, with five of them played at the Mỹ Đình National Stadium in Hanoi. The group consisted of hosts Vietnam, Japan, Qatar and the United Arab Emirates.

== Standings ==
Pos	Team	Pld	W	D	L	GF	GA	GD	Pts	Qualification
1	Japan	3	2	1	0	8	3	+5	7	Advance to knockout stage
2	Vietnam (H)	3	1	1	1	4	5	−1	4	Advance to knockout stage
3	United Arab Emirates	3	1	0	2	3	6	−3	3	
4	Qatar	3	0	2	1	3	4	−1	2	

Source: AFC
Rules for classification: Tiebreakers
(H) Hosts

All times are UTC+7.

== Vietnam vs United Arab Emirates ==
8 July 2007
19:35

Vietnam	2–0	United Arab Emirates
Huỳnh Quang Thanh 64'; Lê Công Vinh 73'	Report

Mỹ Đình National Stadium, Hanoi
Attendance: 39,450
Referee: Talaat Najm (Lebanon)

Vietnam	United Arab Emirates

GK	22	Dương Hồng Sơn
RB	16	Huỳnh Quang Thanh	(yellow card) 58'
CB	3	Nguyễn Huy Hoàng	(yellow card) 78'
CB	7	Vũ Như Thành	(yellow card) 33'
LB	2	Phùng Văn Nhiên
CM	12	Nguyễn Minh Phương (c)		(substituted off) 77'
CM	19	Phan Văn Tài Em	(yellow card) 25'
CM	14	Lê Tấn Tài
AM	17	Nguyễn Vũ Phong	(yellow card) 88'
CF	18	Phan Thanh Bình		(substituted off) 84'
CF	9	Lê Công Vinh		(substituted off) 90+5'
Substitutions:
MF	15	Nguyễn Minh Chuyên		(substituted on) 77'
FW	21	Nguyễn Anh Đức		(substituted on) 84'
FW	10	Huỳnh Phúc Hiệp		(substituted on) 90+5'
Manager:
(Austria) Alfred Riedl

GK	1	Majed Naser	(yellow card) 63'
RB	8	Haider Alo Ali	(yellow card) 45+1'
CB	6	Rashid Abdulrahman
CB	14	Basheer Saeed	(yellow card) 90+3'
LB	17	Yousif Jaber
RM	13	Ahmed Dada		(substituted off) 70'
CM	2	Abdulrahim Jumaa (c)	(yellow card) 59'
CM	20	Hilal Saeed		(substituted off) 80'
LM	10	Ismail Matar
SS	15	Mohamed Al-Shehhi
CF	11	Faisal Khalil
Substitutions:
MF	7	Khalid Darwish		(substituted on) 70'
MF	18	Amer Mubarak		(substituted on) 80'
Manager:
(France) Bruno Metsu

Man of the Match:
Nguyễn Minh Phương (Vietnam)

Assistant referees:
Mustafa Taleb (Lebanon)
Reza Sokhandan (Iran)
Fourth official:
Masoud Moradi (Iran)

== Japan vs Qatar ==
9 July 2007
17:20

Japan	1–1	Qatar
Takahara 61'	Report	Soria 88'

Mỹ Đình National Stadium, Hanoi
Attendance: 5,000
Referee: Matthew Breeze (Australia)

Japan	Qatar

GK	1	Yoshikatsu Kawaguchi (c)
CB	6	Yuki Abe	(yellow card) 87'
CB	22	Yuji Nakazawa
CB	13	Keita Suzuki
DM	2	Yasuyuki Konno
CM	14	Kengo Nakamura		(substituted off) 81'
CM	7	Yasuhito Endō
RW	21	Akira Kaji
AM	10	Shunsuke Nakamura
LW	9	Satoru Yamagishi		(substituted off) 74'
CF	19	Naohiro Takahara
Substitutions:
MF	8	Naotake Hanyu		(substituted on) 74'
MF	24	Hideo Hashimoto		(substituted on) 81'
Manager:
(Bosnia and Herzegovina) Ivica Osim

GK	1	Mohamed Saqr
RB	2	Mesaad Al-Hamad	(yellow card) 20'	(substituted off) 46'
CB	21	Abdulla Koni
CB	13	Mustafa Abdi
LB	6	Meshal Mubarak
DM	15	Talal Al-Bloushi
DM	17	Wesam Rizik		(substituted off) 75'
AM	18	Waleed Jassem		(substituted off) 66'
AM	10	Hussein Yasser	(red card) 90+2'
SS	8	Saad Al-Shammari (c)	(yellow card) 49'
CF	23	Sebastián Soria
Substitutions:
MF	5	Majdi Siddiq		(substituted on) 46'
DF	20	Adel Lamy		(substituted on) 66'
FW	12	Magid Mohamed		(substituted on) 75'
Manager:
(Bosnia and Herzegovina) Džemaludin Mušović

Man of the Match
Shunsuke Nakamura (Japan)

Assistant referees:
Mohamed Saeed (Maldives)
Mohd Sabri bin Mat Daud (Malaysia)
Fourth official:
Satop Tongkhan (Thailand)

== Qatar vs Vietnam ==
12 July 2007
19:35

Qatar	1–1	Vietnam
Soria 79'	Report	Phan Thanh Bình 32'

Mỹ Đình National Stadium, Hanoi
Attendance: 40,000
Referee: Masoud Moradi (Iran)

Qatar	Vietnam

GK	1	Mohamed Saqr
RB	20	Adel Lamy		(substituted off) 73'
CB	21	Abdulla Koni	(yellow card) 77'
CB	13	Mustafa Abdi
LB	6	Meshal Mubarak
CM	15	Talal Al-Bloushi	(yellow card) 22'
CM	17	Wesam Rizik
RW	8	Saad Al-Shammari (c)
AM	18	Waleed Jassem		(substituted off) 58'
LW	12	Magid Mohamed		(substituted off) 78'
CF	23	Sebastián Soria
Substitutions:
FW	9	Sayyed Ali Bechir		(substituted on) 58'
DF	11	Ali Afif		(substituted on) 73'
MF	5	Majdi Siddiq		(substituted on) 78'
Manager:
(Bosnia and Herzegovina) Džemaludin Mušović

GK	22	Dương Hồng Sơn	(yellow card) 42'
RB	16	Huỳnh Quang Thanh
CB	3	Nguyễn Huy Hoàng
CB	7	Vũ Như Thành		(substituted off) 55'
LB	2	Phùng Văn Nhiên
CM	12	Nguyễn Minh Phương (c)
CM	19	Phan Văn Tài Em		(substituted off) 82'
CM	14	Lê Tấn Tài
AM	17	Nguyễn Vũ Phong
CF	18	Phan Thanh Bình		(substituted off) 90+4'
CF	9	Lê Công Vinh
Substitutions:
DF	6	Phạm Hùng Dũng		(substituted on) 55'
MF	15	Nguyễn Minh Chuyên	(yellow card) 90+3'	(substituted on) 82'
FW	21	Nguyễn Anh Đức		(substituted on) 90+4'
Manager:
(Austria) Alfred Riedl

Man of the Match
Phan Thanh Bình (Vietnam)

Assistant referees:
Reza Sokhandan (Iran)
Viktor Serazitdinov (Uzbekistan)
Fourth official:
Talaat Najm (Lebanon)

== United Arab Emirates vs Japan ==
13 July 2007
20:35

United Arab Emirates	1–3	Japan
Al-Kass 66'	Report	Takahara 22', 27'; S. Nakamura 42' (pen.)

Mỹ Đình National Stadium, Hanoi
Attendance: 5,000
Referee: Satop Tongkhan (Thailand)

United Arab Emirates	Japan

GK	1	Majed Naser	(yellow card) 40'
RB	8	Haider Alo Ali	(yellow card) 52'
CB	6	Rashid Abdulrahman
CB	14	Basheer Saeed	(red card) 53'
LB	21	Humaid Fakher
CM	2	Abdulrahim Jumaa (c)
CM	5	Issa Ali	(yellow card) 34'	(substituted off) 46'
CM	20	Hilal Saeed
RF	7	Khalid Darwish		(substituted off) 46'
CF	15	Mohamed Al-Shehhi		(substituted off) 56'
LF	10	Ismail Matar
Substitutions:
MF	13	Ahmed Dada		(substituted on) 46'
FW	19	Saeed Al Kass	(yellow card) 79'	(substituted on) 46'
DF	22	Mohammed Qassim		(substituted on) 56'
Manager:
(France) Bruno Metsu

GK	1	Yoshikatsu Kawaguchi (c)	(yellow card) 83'
CB	6	Yuki Abe
CB	22	Yuji Nakazawa
CB	13	Keita Suzuki		(substituted off) 77'
RM	21	Akira Kaji
CM	14	Kengo Nakamura
CM	7	Yasuhito Endō
LM	3	Yūichi Komano
AM	10	Shunsuke Nakamura	(yellow card) 42'	(substituted off) 71'
CF	19	Naohiro Takahara		(substituted off) 66'
CF	12	Seiichiro Maki
Substitutions:
MF	8	Naotake Hanyu		(substituted on) 66'
MF	15	Koki Mizuno		(substituted on) 71'
MF	2	Yasuyuki Konno		(substituted on) 77'
Manager:
(Bosnia and Herzegovina) Ivica Osim

Man of the Match
Naohiro Takahara (Japan)

Assistant referees:
Mohamed Saeed (Maldives)
Begench Allaberdiyev (Turkmenistan)
Fourth official:
Matthew Breeze (Australia)

== Vietnam vs Japan ==
16 July 2007
17:20

Vietnam	1–4	Japan
Suzuki 7' (o.g.)	Report	Maki 12', 59'; Endō 31'; S. Nakamura 53'

Mỹ Đình National Stadium, Hanoi
Attendance: 40,000
Referee: Matthew Breeze (Australia)

Vietnam	Japan

GK	22	Dương Hồng Sơn
RB	16	Huỳnh Quang Thanh
CB	3	Nguyễn Huy Hoàng
CB	7	Vũ Như Thành
LB	2	Phùng Văn Nhiên
DM	15	Nguyễn Minh Chuyên
RM	12	Nguyễn Minh Phương (c)		(substituted off) 80'
CM	19	Phan Văn Tài Em		(substituted off) 65'
LM	14	Lê Tấn Tài		(substituted off) 74'
AM	17	Nguyễn Vũ Phong
CF	9	Lê Công Vinh	(yellow card) 87'
Substitutions:
MF	11	Phùng Công Minh	(yellow card) 83'	(substituted on) 65'
DF	4	Đoàn Việt Cường		(substituted on) 74'
FW	18	Phan Thanh Bình		(substituted on) 80'
Manager:
(Austria) Alfred Riedl

GK	1	Yoshikatsu Kawaguchi (c)
CB	6	Yuki Abe
CB	22	Yuji Nakazawa
CB	13	Keita Suzuki
RM	21	Akira Kaji
CM	14	Kengo Nakamura
CM	7	Yasuhito Endō		(substituted off) 68'
LM	3	Yūichi Komano
AM	10	Shunsuke Nakamura		(substituted off) 61'
CF	19	Naohiro Takahara
CF	12	Seiichiro Maki		(substituted off) 68'
Substitutions:
MF	8	Naotake Hanyu	(yellow card) 89'	(substituted on) 61'
MF	15	Koki Mizuno		(substituted on) 68'
FW	11	Hisato Satō		(substituted on) 68'
Manager:
(Bosnia and Herzegovina) Ivica Osim

Man of the Match
Seiichiro Maki (Japan)

Assistant referees:
Mohamed Saeed (Maldives)
Begench Allaberdiyev (Turkmenistan)
Fourth official:
Talaat Najm (Lebanon)

== Qatar vs United Arab Emirates ==
16 July 2007
17:20

Qatar	1–2	United Arab Emirates
Soria 42' (pen.)	Report	Al-Kass 60'; Khalil 90+4'

Army Stadium, Ho Chi Minh City
Attendance: 3,000
Referee: Masoud Moradi (Iran)

Qatar	United Arab Emirates

GK	1	Mohamed Saqr
CB	21	Abdulla Koni (c)	(yellow card) 46'
CB	3	Bilal Mohammed
CB	13	Mustafa Abdi	(yellow card) 69'	(substituted off) 72'
CM	17	Wesam Rizik		(substituted off) 79'
CM	15	Talal Al-Bloushi
CM	5	Majdi Siddiq	(yellow card) 45+3'
RW	11	Ali Afif		(substituted off) 69'
AM	10	Hussein Yasser
LW	6	Meshal Mubarak	(yellow card) 64'
CF	23	Sebastián Soria	(yellow card) 33'
Substitutions:
FW	12	Magid Mohamed	(yellow card) 89'	(substituted on) 69'
DF	2	Mesaad Al-Hamad		(substituted on) 72'
DF	20	Adel Lamy		(substituted on) 79'
Manager:
(Bosnia and Herzegovina) Džemaludin Mušović

GK	12	Waleed Salem
RB	2	Abdulrahim Jumaa (c)
CB	6	Rashid Abdulrahman	(yellow card) 40'
CB	22	Mohammed Qassim
LB	17	Yousif Jaber
RM	13	Ahmed Dada
CM	9	Nawaf Mubarak		(substituted off) 81'
CM	18	Amer Mubarak	(yellow card) 77'	(substituted off) 90+1'
LM	4	Ali Msarri
SS	10	Ismail Matar	(yellow card) 90+2'
CF	19	Saeed Al Kass		(substituted off) 78'
Substitutions:
FW	11	Faisal Khalil		(substituted on) 78'
FW	15	Mohamed Al-Shehhi		(substituted on) 81'
MF	20	Hilal Saeed		(substituted on) 90+1'
Manager:
(France) Bruno Metsu

Man of the Match
Saeed Al Kass (United Arab Emirates)

Assistant referees:
Reza Sokhandan (Iran)
Viktor Serazitdinov (Uzbekistan)
Fourth official:
Satop Tongkhan (Thailand)
