= Vietnam v United Arab Emirates (2007 AFC Asian Cup) =

Vietnam vs United Arab Emirates
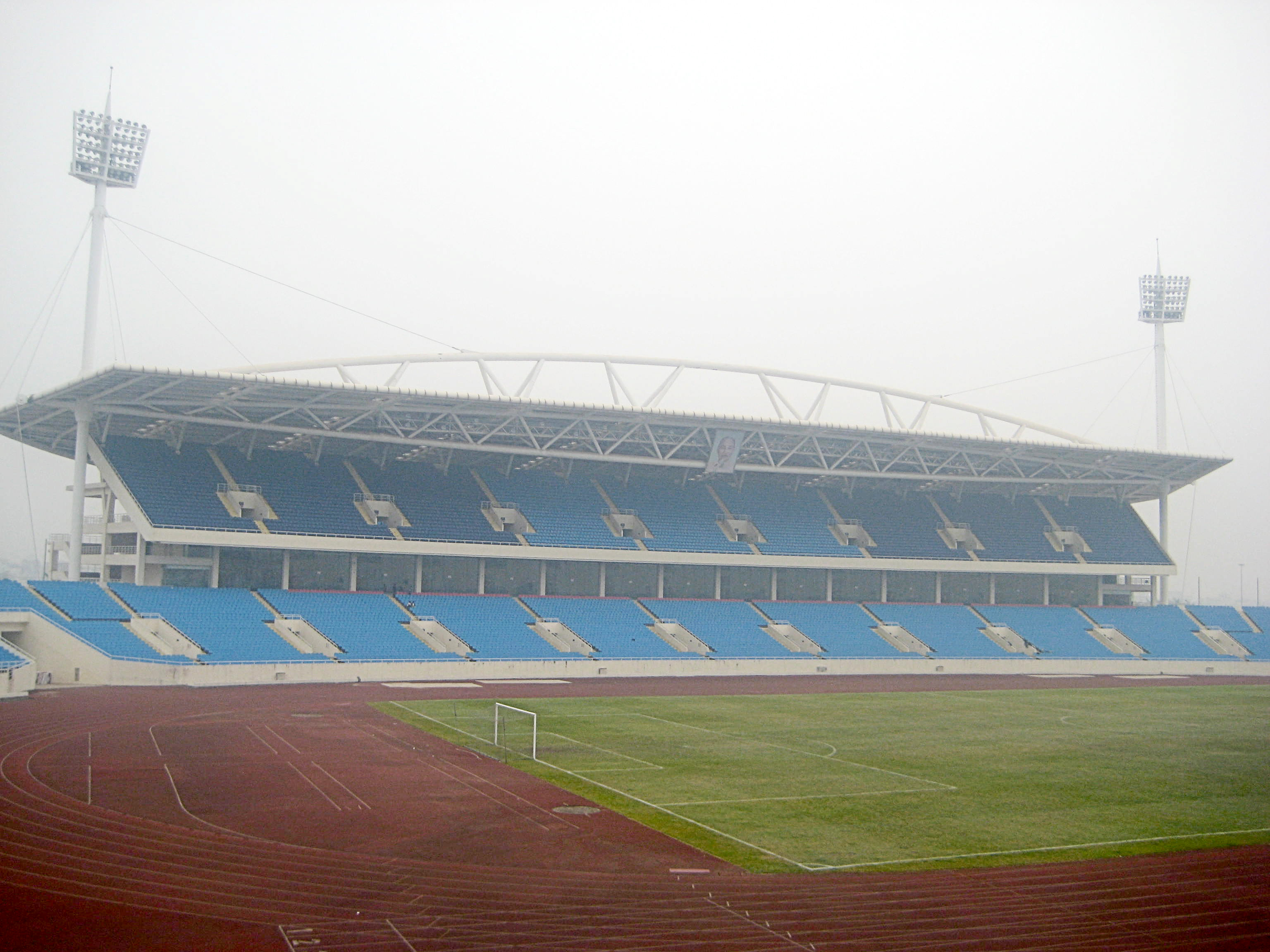
- The Mỹ Đình National Stadium held the match
- Event: 2007 AFC Asian Cup
Vietnam	United Arab Emirates
(Vietnam)	(United Arab Emirates)
2	0
- Date: 8 July 2007
- Venue: Mỹ Đình National Stadium, Hanoi
- Referee: Talaat Najm (Lebanon)
- Attendance: 39,450

The men's national association football teams of Vietnam and the United Arab Emirates played a match on 8 July 2007 as part of the 2007 AFC Asian Cup. The game marked the debut of a united Vietnamese national football team at the continental level. Previously, only South Vietnam had played in competitive tournaments. Vietnam qualified for the tournament as one of four co-hosts of the 2007 Asian Cup, along with Indonesia, Malaysia and Thailand.

In the UAE as well as the Arab world, the match was dubbed the Disaster of Hanoi (Arabic: كارثة هانوي), as the UAE suffered a denting loss to a much weaker and less developed host nation. Meanwhile in Vietnam, the match has been significant due to its influence on the future development of Vietnamese football and is remembered as the Miracle of Hanoi (Vietnamese: Điều kỳ diệu ở Hà Nội). The match has been very deep-rooted in Vietnamese society and is still often referred to by Vietnamese fans and press to cheer themselves up against opponents from the Middle East.

== Background ==
Initially, Vietnam was split into two national teams: North Vietnam and South Vietnam. As a member of both the AFC and FIFA, South Vietnam played the first two editions of the AFC Asian Cup in 1956 and 1960. North Vietnam on the other hand was not an AFC or FIFA member and therefore did not play in any international tournaments.

The Vietnam War, along with subsequent conflicts after 1975 against the Khmer Rouge and China, resulted in a crippling economic downturn. Football development was severely stunted as a result of these wars, as well as international sanctions and isolation. However, economic reforms in 1986 marked Vietnam's return to the international stage and their reappearance in international football.

The United Arab Emirates first appeared at an Asian Cup in 1980. The team later qualified for the 1990 FIFA World Cup, their only World Cup to date. The Emiratis went on to become runners-up of the 1996 AFC Asian Cup on home soil and qualified for the 1997 FIFA Confederations Cup, their second FIFA tournament. By the time they qualified for the 2007 Asian Cup, they were led by Frenchman Bruno Metsu, who helped Senegal reach the quarter-finals in their maiden 2002 FIFA World Cup. He led the UAE to win the 18th Arabian Gulf Cup, again on home soil.

The UAE was believed to be the better team leading up to the match and even with Vietnam being the hosts, there were little expectations that Vietnam could win.

== Pre-match ==
=== Vietnam ===
Vietnam was regarded as an unskilled and uncoordinated team and had a below-average performance in the 2006 World Cup qualification phase, finishing third in their group with a record of 1-1-4. Vietnam's performance had also suffered criticism at the 2007 AFF Championship, when they were eliminated in the semi-finals by Thailand following a 0-2 defeat at home and a 0-0 away draw. Due to these disappointing performances, coach Alfred Riedl said he had low expectations. Vietnam were drawn against three previous champions in its group: defending champions Japan, 2006 Asian Games champion Qatar and Arabian Gulf Cup champions the UAE. To make matters worse, Vietnam was the lowest-ranked team in the competition, ranking 172nd at the time.

To prepare for the competition, Vietnam played two friendlies against Jamaica and Bahrain, with the latter sharing common cultural ties with the United Arab Emirates and finished fourth at the previous Asian Cup. Vietnam managed to beat Jamaica 3–0 before creating a goal fever in a 5–3 win against Bahrain.

=== United Arab Emirates ===
The UAE suffered an injury crisis leading up to the tournament, but were expected to win this match anyway. The UAE, having just won the Arabian Gulf Cup the same year, had several top stars in their squad, notably Ismail Matar, Amer Mubarak and Faisal Khalil. They were also led by Frenchman Bruno Metsu, who led Senegal to the quarter-finals of the 2002 FIFA World Cup. Moreover, the UAE also had the upper hand in the FIFA rankings, ranking 87th at the time.

== Match ==
=== Summary ===
==== First half ====
Vietnam and the UAE opened the Group B matches under the supervision of Lebanese referee Talaat Najm. The UAE started strongly, pressuring the Vietnamese defense in the opening minutes. Vietnam was cheered on by a majority of home fans, but the UAE dominated the opening minutes, demonstrating their skill and experience. Despite this, Vietnam had several chances, but poor finishing led to them scoring no goals. The UAE controlled possession and managed to create several promising chances, but also didn't score.

The Vietnamese players' discipline helped keep the score at 0-0 heading into half time. Vietnam's goalkeeper, Dương Hồng Sơn, played a key role in keeping the score level in the first half.

==== Second half ====
The early stages of the second half were again dominated by the UAE. Despite missing several opportunities, the UAE side kept focusing on the offensive, leaving them vulnerable to Vietnamese counterattacks.

When the ball was passed from the Emirati defence to Ismail Matar, Huỳnh Quang Thanh intercepted the ball. Thanh passed it to Nguyễn Minh Phương before making a run into the penalty area of the UAE. Majed Naser, slow to react to Phương's run, allowed a decisive strike by Thanh to give Vietnam a 1–0 lead in the 64th minute. This came as a complete surprise to the supporters in the stadium, as this was expected to be a routine victory for the UAE.

Faisal Khalil had a chance to equalize for the UAE, but failed to finish. Following which, Vietnam took advantage of the opposing team committing men forward and launched a counter-attack. However, Phùng Văn Nhiên was too slow in his decision-making and the ball was quickly reclaimed by Rashid Abdulrahman, who then passed to Matar. Matar shot directly to the foot of Hồng Sơn and the ball was sent towards Minh Phương. He then made a long pass through to Lê Công Vinh, who shot the ball over Naser's head in the 73rd minute, giving Vietnam a 2-0 lead.

The Emiratis attacked all-out during the final minutes to no avail. Vietnam ended the match victorious with a score of 2–0 and created the biggest shock in the opening days of the tournament. For the UAE, the loss had a disastrous consequence on their campaign and for Vietnam, their shock victory over one of Asia's best teams at the time helped establish them as a competent nation in football.

=== Details ===
8 July 2007
19:35

Vietnam	2–0	United Arab Emirates
Huỳnh Quang Thanh 64'; Lê Công Vinh 73'	Report

Mỹ Đình National Stadium, Hanoi
Attendance: 39,450
Referee: Talaat Najm (Lebanon)

Vietnam	United Arab Emirates

GK	22	Dương Hồng Sơn
RB	16	Huỳnh Quang Thanh	(yellow card) 58'
CB	3	Nguyễn Huy Hoàng	(yellow card) 78'
CB	7	Vũ Như Thành	(yellow card) 33'
LB	2	Phùng Văn Nhiên
CM	12	Nguyễn Minh Phương (c)		(substituted off) 77'
CM	19	Phan Văn Tài Em	(yellow card) 25'
CM	14	Lê Tấn Tài
AM	17	Nguyễn Vũ Phong	(yellow card) 88'
CF	18	Phan Thanh Bình		(substituted off) 84'
CF	9	Lê Công Vinh		(substituted off) 90+5'
Substitutions:
MF	15	Nguyễn Minh Chuyên		(substituted on) 77'
FW	21	Nguyễn Anh Đức		(substituted on) 84'
FW	10	Huỳnh Phúc Hiệp		(substituted on) 90+5'
Manager:
(Austria) Alfred Riedl

GK	1	Majed Naser	(yellow card) 63'
RB	8	Haider Alo Ali	(yellow card) 45+1'
CB	6	Rashid Abdulrahman
CB	14	Basheer Saeed	(yellow card) 90+3'
LB	17	Yousif Jaber
RM	13	Ahmed Dada		(substituted off) 70'
CM	2	Abdulrahim Jumaa (c)	(yellow card) 59'
CM	20	Hilal Saeed		(substituted off) 80'
LM	10	Ismail Matar
SS	15	Mohamed Al-Shehhi
CF	11	Faisal Khalil
Substitutions:
MF	7	Khalid Darwish		(substituted on) 70'
MF	18	Amer Mubarak		(substituted on) 80'
Manager:
(France) Bruno Metsu

Man of the Match:
Nguyễn Minh Phương (Vietnam)

Assistant referees:
Mustafa Taleb (Lebanon)
Reza Sokhandan (Iran)
Fourth official:
Masoud Moradi (Iran)

== Aftermath ==
Vietnam's victory over the UAE was considered one of the biggest upsets of the tournament. Before the tournament, Vietnam was expected to make an early exit given their lowest-ranking position in the tournament, while the UAE was expected to advance to the later stages.

It also had a significant consequence for the tournament and sparked a surge of surprise upsets in the Asian Cup, including Iraq's shock 3–1 win over Australia and Bahrain's 2–1 victory over South Korea. Although they lost 4–1 to a much more powerful Japan, Vietnam successfully booked their ticket to the quarter-finals, at which they were beaten by eventual champions Iraq. They were the only team to advance out of the four host nations and one of three to win a match at all. The tournament was seen as a renaissance of football in the country.

For the UAE, their defeat had a noticeable impact on the team's confidence. They were beaten 3–1 by Japan and their 2–1 win over neighbours Qatar did little to help them. Ironically, their victory helped Vietnam advance to the next round.

After the tournament, the UAE's performance continued to fall. Their participation at the next tournament in Qatar was even more disastrous when one of their players scored two own goals in two matches. The team ended up last in their group, behind Iran, Iraq and even underdogs North Korea. By the 2015 AFC Asian Cup, they had improved their performances and finished third.

Vietnam did not qualify for another Asian Cup until the 2019 edition, which was hosted by the UAE. Vietnam reached the quarter-finals despite being in the same group with Asian powerhouses and former Asian Cup champions Iran and Iraq. They also managed to overcome two Middle Eastern sides, Yemen and Jordan, both of whom share common cultural ties to the UAE. Meanwhile, the UAE managed to reach the semi-finals for the second consecutive tournament, but failed to defeat eventual champions Qatar in a disappointing 0–4 loss.

Both Vietnam and the UAE were drawn into Group G in the 2022 World Cup qualifiers along with three other ASEAN teams: Indonesia, Malaysia, and Thailand in what was described as an easy group. Vietnam repeated their victory against UAE at home 1–0 for their first win in 12 years and culminated in the sacking of Bert van Marwijk. Due to the COVID-19 pandemic, the AFC decided that all remaining matches would be played in one country in each group. The UAE was declared the host team in Group G, something they took advantage of to U-turn the earlier misery into four consecutive wins, including a 3–2 victory in the return match against Vietnam to qualify for both the third round and 2023 AFC Asian Cup as Group G winners. Vietnam, meanwhile, clinched both qualification spots as one of the 5 best group runners-up after Australia beat Jordan 1–0 and Saudi Arabia beat Uzbekistan 3–0.
