= 2002 Arab Cup final =

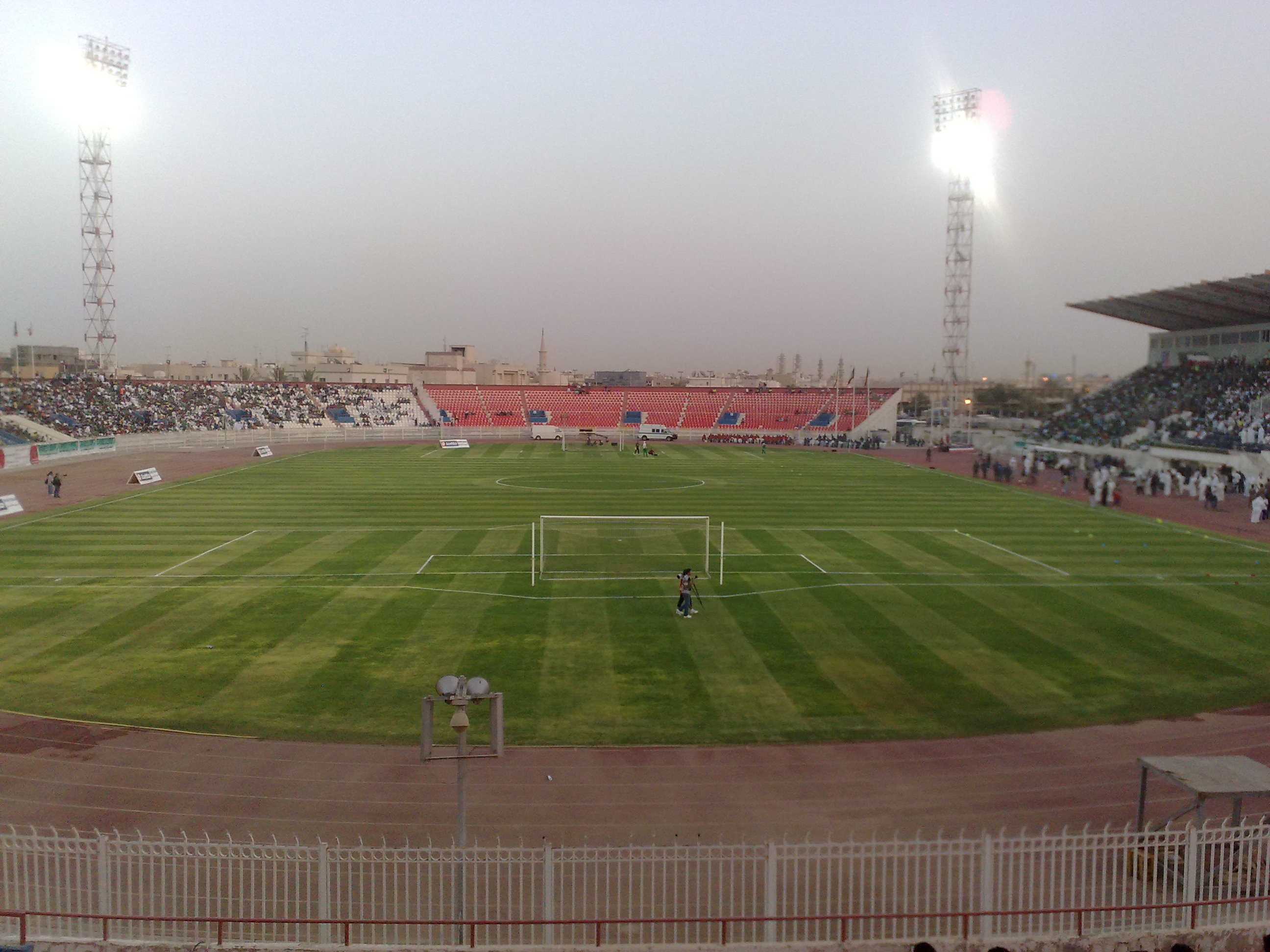
- Al Kuwait Sports Club Stadium
- Event: 2002 Arab Cup
Saudi Arabia	Bahrain
(Saudi Arabia)	(Bahrain)
1	0
- After extra time
- Date: 30 December 2002
- Venue: Al Kuwait Sports Club Stadium, Kuwait City
- Man of the Match: Mohammed Noor
- Referee: Mohamed Zekrini (Algeria)
- Attendance: 7,500

The 2002 Arab Cup final was a football match played on 30 December 2002 at the Al Kuwait Sports Club Stadium in Kuwait City, Kuwait, to determine the winner of the 2002 Arab Cup. Saudi Arabia defeated Bahrain 1–0 in extra time to win their second consecutive Arab Cup.

== Road to the final ==
In this edition, the ten qualifying teams had been divided into two groups. The two future finalists, Saudi Arabia and Bahrain ended up in the same group B. Saudi Arabia topped the group ahead of Bahrain. In the semi-final, Saudi Arabia beat Morocco and Bahrain beat Jordan and met for a second time in the final.

Saudi Arabia		Bahrain	
Opponents	Results	Opponents	Results
Group stage
Bahrain	2–1	Saudi Arabia	1–2
Lebanon	1–0	Syria	2–0
Syria	3–0	Yemen	3–1
Yemen	2–2	Lebanon	0–0
Semi-finals
Morocco U23	2–0	Jordan	2–1 (a.e.t.)

== Match ==
The Saudi national team maintained its title after becoming a champion of the 2002 Arab Cup soccer competition at Al Kuwait Sports Club Stadium in Kuwait City in the final match of the eighth edition. Mohammed Noor scored the golden goal in the 94th minute with a header after a cross pass from Abdulaziz Al-Janoubi, housed in the left corner of bahraini goalkeeper Ali Hassan.

At the start of the match, the Bahraini team relied on pressure on the players of the Saudi team, and with the passage of minutes, the Saudi team succeeded in possessing the ball and carrying out coordinated attacks that were broken before it reached the area of goalkeeper Ali Hassan.

The Saudi team had the advantage in the second half and tried hard to shake the net of Bahrain goalkeeper, whose players relied on defense and rapid counterattacks led by Ahmed Hassan and Hussein Ali. The game took place in the middle of the field during most of times of the match.

Algerian referee Mohamed Zekrini deprived Saudi Arabia from a penalty kick in the last minute when Mohamed Nour was pulled from the shirt inside the region, so his penalty was a yellow card, and the regular time ended with a goalless draw.

The Saudi team continued its pressure and succeeded in scoring the golden goal after a cross pass by Abdulaziz Al-Janoubi that Mohammed Noor reached over the defenders Salman Isa and the captain Faisal Abdulaziz and lodged it with his head in the left corner of goalkeeper Ali Hassan (94).

It is the second consecutive title for Saudi Arabia after winning the title of the last session in Doha at the expense of Qatar 3-1 in 1998, noting that it was entering the final for the third time after its 1992 loss to Egypt 2-3 in the Syrian city of Aleppo.

=== Details ===
30 December 2002

Saudi Arabia	1–0 (a.e.t.)	Bahrain
Noor 94'	Report

Al Kuwait Sports Club Stadium, Kuwait City
Attendance: 7,500
Referee: Mohamed Zekrini (Algeria)

Saudi Arabia	Bahrain

Saudi Arabia:
GK	–	Mabrouk Zaid
DF	–	Redha Tukar	(yellow card) 76'
DF	–	Hamad Al-Montashari
DF	–	Saud Kariri
DF	–	Saleh Al-Saqri	(yellow card) 77'
MF	–	Abdullah Al-Waked
MF	–	Abdulaziz Al-Janoubi
MF	–	Omar Al-Ghamdi
MF	–	Mohammed Noor	(yellow card) 90'
FW	–	Yasser Al-Qahtani
FW	–	Talal Al-Meshal
Substitutes:
GK	–	Saeed Al-Harbi
DF	–	Hamad Al-Eissa
DF	–	Naser Al-Halawi
DF	–	Faisal Al-Obaili
MF	–	Ahmed Al-Khair
MF	–	Mohammed Al-Faifi
Manager:
(Netherlands) Martin Koopman

Bahrain:
GK	–	Ali Hassan
DF	–	Abdulla Al-Marzooqi	(yellow card) 90'
DF	–	Abdulaziz Saleh Al-Dosari
DF	–	Faisal Abdulaziz
DF	–	Salman Isa
MF	–	Sayed Mahmood Jalal	(yellow card) 32'
MF	–	Talal Yousef
MF	–	Rashid Al-Dosari	(yellow card) 70'
MF	–	Ahmed Hassan Taleb
FW	–	Husain Ali
FW	–	Abdullah Khalid Al-Dosari		(substituted off) 53'
Substitutes:
MF	–	Hussain Salman	(yellow card) 87'	(substituted on) 53'
MF	–	Mohamed Salmeen
Manager:
(Germany) Wolfgang Sidka

Assistant referees:
Ali Al-Khleifi (Qatar)
Othman Mohamed (Sudan)
Fourth official:
TBA (...)

Man of the Match:
Mohammed Noor (Saudi Arabia)
