= Nguyễn Huy Hoàng =

Nguyễn Huy Hoàng may refer to:

- Nguyễn Huy Hoàng (football) (born 1981), Vietnamese footballer
- Nguyễn Huy Hoàng (swimmer) (born 2000), Vietnamese swimmer
