= Ahmed Al-Akberi =

Emirati association football player (born 1997)

Ahmed Al-Akberi أحمد العكبري
Personal information
- Full name: Ahmed Salman Abdulla Al-Akberi
- Date of birth: 15 July 1997 (age 29)
- Place of birth: Emirates
- Height: 1.85 m (6 ft 1 in)
- Position: Midfielder

Youth career
- –2015: Al-Wahda

Senior career*
Years	Team	Apps	(Gls)
2015–2019	Al-Wahda	24	(2)
- * Club domestic league appearances and goals

Ahmed Al-Akberi (Arabic:أحمد العكبري) (born 15 July 1997) is an Emirati footballer. He currently plays as a midfielder former Al-Wahda.

== Career ==
Al-Akberi started his career at Al-Wahda and is a product of the Al-Wahda's youth system. On 12 March 2015, Al-Akberi made his professional debut for Al Wahda against Al-Wasl in the Pro League, replacing Mohamed Al-Shehhi. On 18 October 2018, He had a serious traffic accident On 9 December 2018, Al-Akberi declares that he will not be able to play football again
