= Botir Qoraev =

Uzbekistani footballer

Botir Qоraev (born 8 April 1980 in Qarshi, Uzbek SSR, Soviet Union) is an Uzbek footballer who plays as a defender for Nasaf Qarshi. He is a member of Uzbekistan national football team.
