= Abdulaziz Al-Janoubi =

Saudi Arabian footballer

Personal information
- Full name: Abdulaziz Al-Janoubi
- Date of birth: 20 July 1974 (age 52)
- Place of birth: Saudi Arabia
- Height: 1.75 m (5 ft 9 in)
- Positions: Defender; midfielder

Senior career*
Years	Team	Apps	(Gls)
1997–2007	Al-Nassr		
2007–2011	Sdoos		
2011–2014	Al Hmadah Club		

International career
1997–2004	Saudi Arabia	19	(2)
- * Club domestic league appearances and goals

Abdulaziz Al-Janoubi (Arabic: عبدالعزيز الجنوبي) (born 20 July 1974) is a retired Saudi Arabian footballer. He played in a defensive role.

Al-Janoubi played club football for Al-Nassr, including at the 2000 FIFA Club World Championship. He was also part of the Saudi Arabia national football team at the 1998 FIFA World Cup.
