= Đồng Huy Thái =

Vietnamese footballer (born 1985)

Personal information
- Full name: Đồng Huy Thái
- Date of birth: January 7, 1985 (age 41)
- Place of birth: Hà Trung, Thanh Hóa, Vietnam
- Height: 1.73 m (5 ft 8 in)
- Position: Midfielder

Youth career
- 1995–2003: Thanh Hóa

Senior career*
Years	Team	Apps	(Gls)
2004–2006	Thanh Hóa	98	(27)
2007–2008	Thể Công	23	(7)
2009–2014	Hà Nội T&T	139	(19)

International career^{‡}
2007–2009	Vietnam	24	(4)
- * Club domestic league appearances and goals ‡ National team caps and goals as of 09:55, 15 February 2011 (UTC)

Đồng Huy Thái (born 7 January 1985 in Thanh Hóa, Vietnam) is a Vietnamese footballer who is a midfielder for Hà Nội T&T. He was called to Vietnamese internationals, played at the 2007 AFC Asian Cup.
