= FC Kallon-Liberia =

Liberian football club

- Full name: FC Kallon-Liberia
- Nickname: The Resilience
- Founded: March 16, 2008; 18 years ago
- Ground: Antoinette Tubman Stadium; Monrovia, Liberia
- Capacity: 10,000
- Manager: Jehezakiah Benjamin
- League: Liberian First Division
- 2025–26: 3rd of 14
Home colours	Away colours	Third colours

FC Kallon is a Liberian professional football club based in Paynesville. Founded on March 16, 2008, on DuPort Road in Paynesville, outside of Monrovia, the club was named Muscat FC before it became FC Kallon.

FC Kallon has positively engaged young people in Liberia by committing to support their game and encourage education for all through sports. The club gained promotion to the second division in 2018 after it was undefeated and crowned champions of the third division. The club finished the 2019 season in sixth place, which placed them in the promotion playoff against Nimba Kwado FC.

== Club history ==
Fourth Division

The club played in the fourth division for two seasons from 2005 to 2007. They got promoted to the third division in 2010.

Third Division

Muscat FC played in the third division for three seasons and got promoted to the second division in 2013 for the first time. The team played 19 league matches, winning 16, drawing 2, and losing 1.

Second Division

Muscat FC played in the second division league in 2014 successfully in the first phase, earning the second spot on the league table. During the second phase, Muscat was deducted six points for allegedly "fielding an illegal player" thereby awarding the points to Gardnerville FC. At the end of the league season, Muscat FC was relegated to the third division.

== Achievements ==
- Liberian Third Division
  - Champions (1): 2018
- Liberian Third Division
  - Runners-up (1): 2013

== Squad ==
Note: Flags indicate national team as defined under FIFA eligibility rules; some limited exceptions apply. Players may hold more than one non-FIFA nationality.

No.	Pos.	Nation	Player
13	DF	LBR	James Nyonno
16	GK	LBR	Oscar Flomo
18	GK	LBR	Matthew Zogbaye
1	GK	LBR	Duncan Mulbah
22	DF	LBR	William Yarkpawolo
17	DF	LBR	Daniel Jallah
3	DF	LBR	Tristan Kromah
5	DF	LBR	Neil Koffa
12	DF	LBR	Roger Wesseh
13	DF	LBR	Charlie Suah
15	DF	LBR	Isaiah Yakpah
28	DF	LBR	Stewart Gbaa
25	MF	LBR	Richard Nyei

No.	Pos.	Nation	Player
4	MF	LBR	Denzel Mawolo
2	MF	LBR	Stephen Vah
20	MF	LBR	Francis Sackor
6	MF	LBR	Billy Zogbaye
8	MF	LBR	Ethan Krah
19	MF	LBR	Andrew Gbollie
24	MF	LBR	Marcus Boakai
21	FW	LBR	Victor Flomo
27	FW	LBR	Alex Nyenpan
30	FW	LBR	Gerald Wulu
14	FW	LBR	Trevor Binda
7	FW	LBR	Jonathan Gbotoe
10	FW	LBR	Miles Kromah

== Technical staff ==
- Head coach: Thomas Nyonno
- Assistant Coach: Stephen Kromah
- Administrative Manager: Edward Gbotoe
- Medic: Kevin Suah
- Trainer: Edward Gbotoe
