= Faisal Abdulaziz =

Bahraini footballer (1968–2021)

Personal information
- Full name: Faisal Abdulaziz Al Dosari
- Date of birth: 8 January 1968
- Place of birth: Bahrain
- Date of death: 19 February 2021 (aged 53)
- Height: 1.82 m (5 ft 11 1/2 in)
- Position: Defender

Senior career*
Years	Team	Apps	(Gls)
1985–2005	Muharraq		

International career
1996–2004	Bahrain	48	(1)
- * Club domestic league appearances and goals

Faisal Abdulaziz Al Dosari (8 January 1968 – 19 February 2021) was a Bahraini football defender who played for Bahrain in the 2004 AFC Asian Cup.

== Death ==
Faisal died in the morning of 19 February 2021 at the age of 53 after a battle with illness. His death was a significant loss to the Bahraini football community, where he was remembered as a dedicated player, particularly for his role in Bahrain's golden generation, which nearly qualified for the FIFA World Cup on two occasions.
