= Mohammad Khamis =

Emirati footballer (born 1976)

Mohammad Khamis Saleh (Arabic: محمد خميس صالح; born 11 March 1976) is a retired Emirati footballer. He played for Dubai's Al-Nasr sport club and Emirati internationals.
