= Gayratjon Hasanov =

Uzbekistani footballer

Personal information
- Full name: Gayratjon Hasanov
- Date of birth: 12 January 1983 (age 43)
- Place of birth: Yaypan, Uzbek SSR, Soviet Union
- Height: 1.83 m (6 ft 0 in)
- Position: Goalkeeper

Senior career*
| Years | Team | Apps | (Gls) |
| 2002–2003 | PFK Sementchi | 16 | (0) |
| 2003–2009 | Neftchi Fergana | 65 | (0) |
| 2009–2011 | Khorazm | 32 | (0) |
| 2011–2012 | Andijon | 21 | (0) |
| 2012–2013 | Nasaf | 8 | (0) |
| 2013–2015 | Neftchi Fergana | 22 | (0) |
| 2016–2017 | Kokand 1912 | 4 | (0) |

International career^{‡}
| 2007–2009 | Uzbekistan | 1 | (0) |
- * Club domestic league appearances and goals as of 3 March 2019 ‡ National team caps and goals as of 21 January 2019

Gayratjon Hasanov (born 12 January 1983 in Qarshi, Uzbek SSR, Soviet Union) is an Uzbek footballer who plays as a goalkeeper for Nasaf Qarshi. He is a member of Uzbekistan national football team.
