= Phùng Công Minh =

Vietnamese footballer

Personal information
- Full name: Phùng Công Minh
- Date of birth: 27 September 1985 (age 41)
- Place of birth: Chi Lăng, Lạng Sơn, Vietnam
- Height: 1.68 m (5 ft 6 in)
- Position: Midfielder

Youth career
- 1995–2003: DongA Bank

Senior career*
Years	Team	Apps	(Gls)
2004–2005	DongA Bank	20	(3)
2006–2011	Becamex Bình Dương	97	(12)

International career
2007–2008	Vietnam	3	(0)
- * Club domestic league appearances and goals

Phùng Công Minh (born 27 September 1985) is a former Vietnamese footballer who last played for Vietnamese club TDC Binh Duong.

== Honours ==
=== Club ===
Bình Dương F.C.

- V-League: 2007, 2008
- Vietnamese Super Cup: 2007, 2008
