= Mohammed Qassim =

Emirati footballer (born 1981)

Personal information
- Full name: Mohammed Qassim Al-Balooshi
- Date of birth: 9 November 1981 (age 44)
- Height: 1.75 m (5 ft 9 in)
- Position: Defender

Senior career*
Years	Team	Apps	(Gls)
2000–2001	Al Ain		
2001–2012	Al Ahli		
2012–2015	Al Dhafra		
2015–2016	Dibba Al Fujairah		
2016–2017	Hatta		
2017–2018	Dibba Al Hisn		

International career
2002–2010	UAE	68	(1)
- * Club domestic league appearances and goals

Mohammed Qassim Al-Balooshi (born November 9, 1981) is a footballer from the United Arab Emirates (UAE). He is currently a team manager at United FC (Dubai), he formerly spent over ten seasons with Al-Ahli in Dubai. He also played 68 matches for United Arab Emirates national football team.
