= Mustafa Abdi =

Qatari footballer (born 1984)

Mostafa Abdi
Personal information
- Full name: Mustafa Abdi
- Date of birth: 2 January 1984 (age 42)
- Place of birth: Doha, Qatar
- Height: 1.84 m (6 ft 1/2 in)
- Position: Defender

Senior career*
Years	Team	Apps	(Gls)
2001–2007	Al-Gharafa	60	(6)
2008–2010	Al Rayyan	34	(6)
2010–2017	Al-Gharafa	34	(2)
2017–2018	Umm Salal	4	(0)
2018–2019	Al-Arabi	6	(1)
2019–2020	Al-Shamal		
2020	Mesaimeer		

International career
2007–	Qatar	15	(0)
- * Club domestic league appearances and goals

Mustafa Abdi (born 2 January 1984) is a Qatari footballer who currently plays.

== Career ==
The defender has played for Al Rayyan for two seasons before returning to Al-Gharafa.

== International goals ==
#	Date	Venue	Opponent	Score	Result	Competition
	21 November 2007	Doha, Qatar	Ivory Coast	1-6	Lost	Friendly
