= Meshal Mubarak =

Qatari footballer (born 1982)

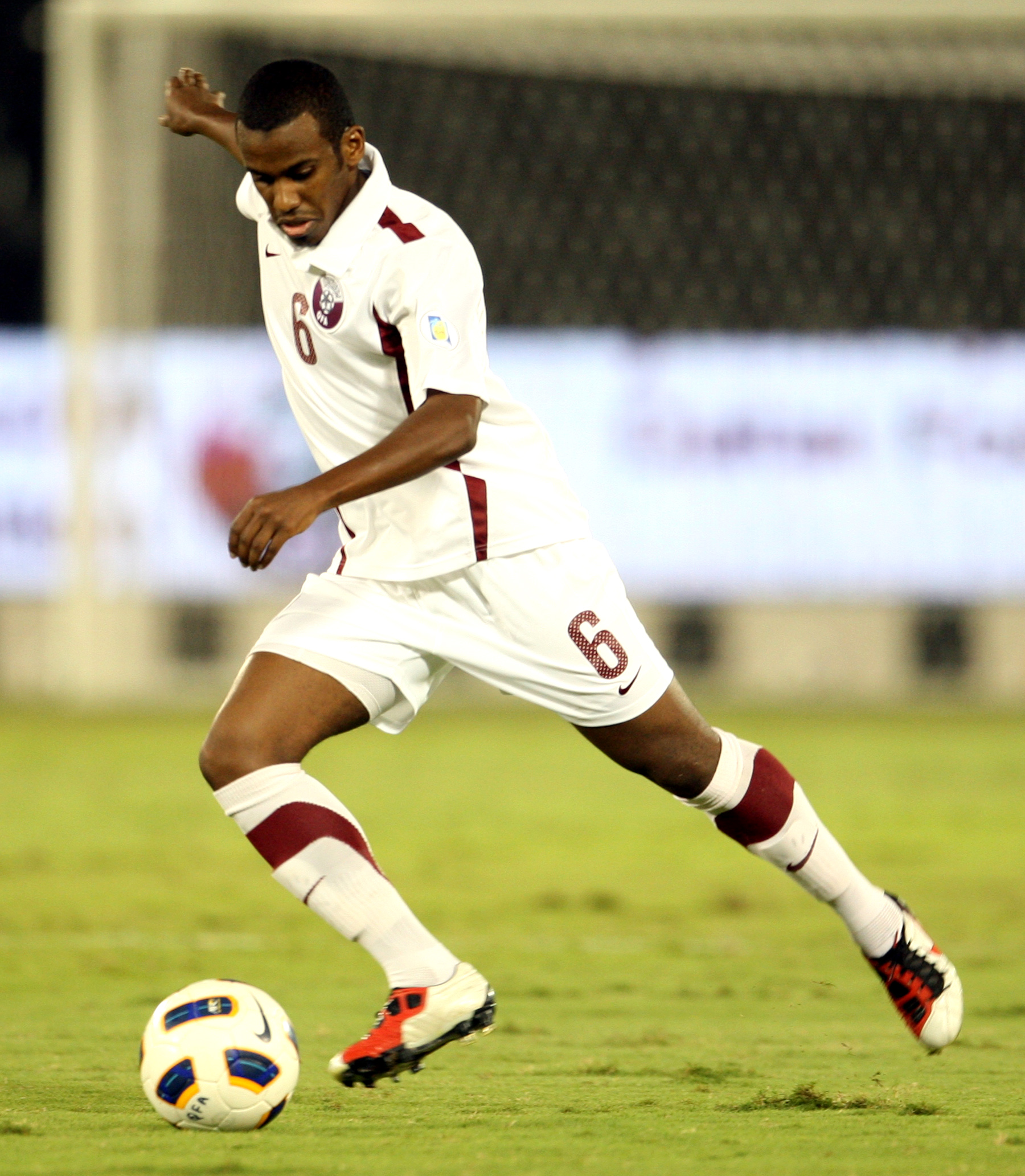

Personal information
- Full name: Meshal Mubarak Budawood
- Date of birth: February 25, 1982 (age 44)
- Place of birth: Doha, Qatar
- Height: 1.69 m (5 ft 6 1/2 in)
- Position: Defender

Youth career
- 1997–2000: Qatar SC

Senior career*
Years	Team	Apps	(Gls)
1999–2009	Qatar SC	188	(11)
2001	→ Al-Wakra (loan)		
2003	→ Feyenoord (loan)	0	(0)
2009–2012	Al-Rayyan	50	(0)
2012–2015	Al-Gharafa		
2015–2018	Al-Ahli		

International career
2000–2012	Qatar	89	(3)
- * Club domestic league appearances and goals

Meshal Mubarak Budawood (born February 25, 1982) is a Qatari professional footballer who is a left-back defender. He was a member of the Qatar national football team. One of the best prospects of Qatari football, he was loaned to Feyenoord Rotterdam from Qatar SC in 2003.

== Club career statistics ==
Statistics accurate as of 27 May 2012

Club	Season	League	League		Cup^{1}		League Cup^{2}		Continental^{3}		Total	
Club	Season	League	Apps	Goals	Apps	Goals	Apps	Goals	Apps	Goals	Apps	Goals
Qatar SC	1998–99	QSL	6	0								
Qatar SC	1999–00	QSL	9	1								
Qatar SC	2000–01	QSL	6	1								
Qatar SC	2001–02	QSL	12	1								
Qatar SC	2002–03	QSL	7	0								
Qatar SC	2003–04	QSL	17	0								
Qatar SC	2004–05	QSL	25	1								
Qatar SC	2005–06	QSL	25	1								
Qatar SC	2006–07	QSL	26	2								
Qatar SC	2007–08	QSL	19	1								
Qatar SC	2008–09	QSL	12	0								
Qatar SC	Total		188	11								
Al-Rayyan	2009–10	QSL	18	0								
Al-Rayyan	2010–11	QSL	19	0								
Al-Rayyan	2011–12	QSL	13	0								
Al-Rayyan	Total		50	0								
Career total			201	8								

^{1}Includes Emir of Qatar Cup.

^{2}Includes Sheikh Jassem Cup.

^{3}Includes AFC Champions League.
