= Bruno Metsu =

French football manager (1954–2013)

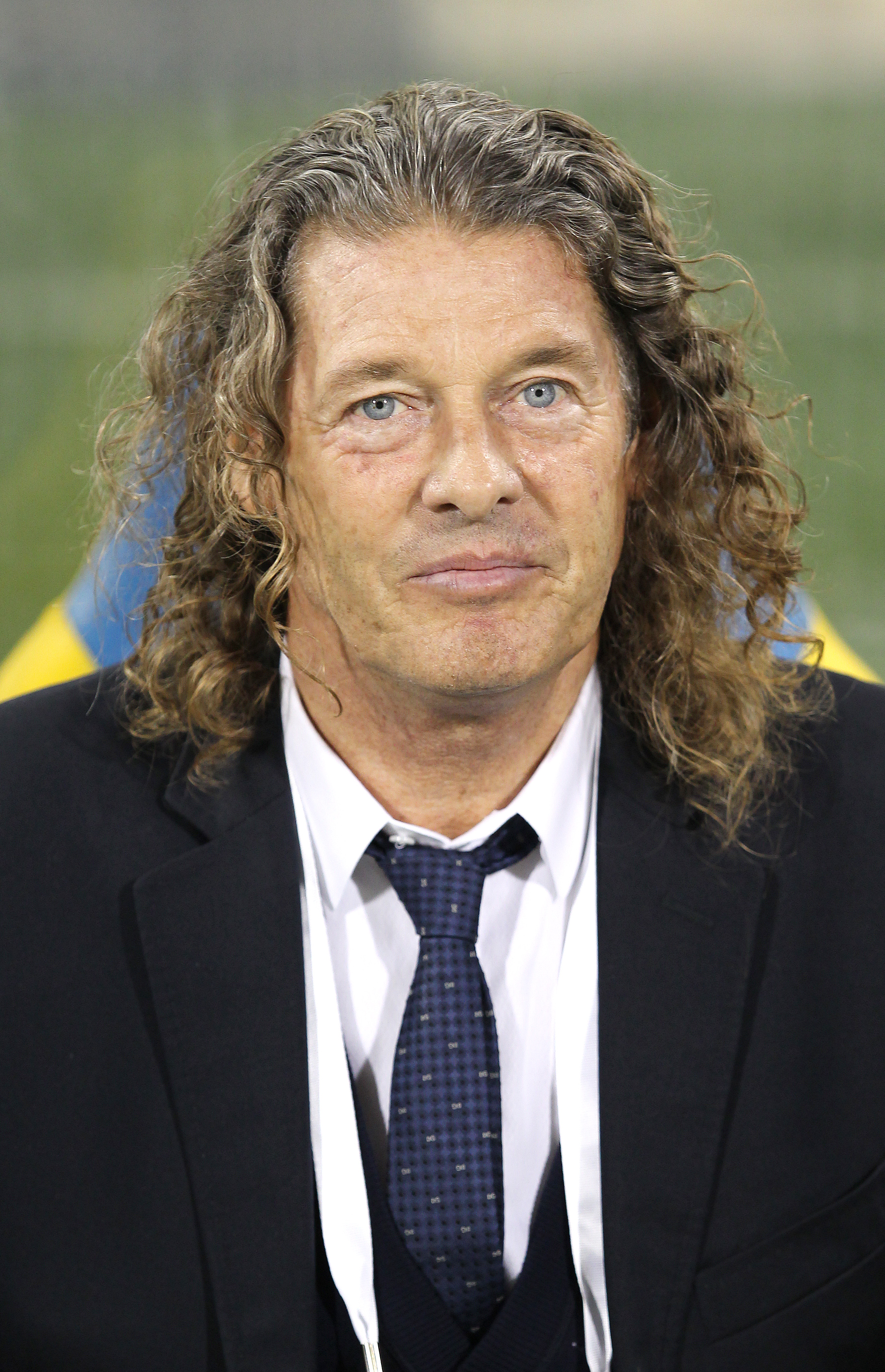
- Metsu in 2012

Personal information
- Full name: Bruno Jean Cornil Metsu
- Date of birth: 28 January 1954
- Place of birth: Coudekerque-Branche, France
- Date of death: 15 October 2013 (aged 59)
- Place of death: Coudekerque-Branche, France
- Height: 1.79 m (5 ft 10 in)
- Position: Midfielder

Youth career
- 1969–1970: Hazebrouck
- 1970–1973: Anderlecht

Senior career*
| Years | Team | Apps | (Gls) |
| 1973–1974 | Dunkerque | 27 | (1) |
| 1974–1975 | Hazebrouck | 34 | (6) |
| 1975–1979 | Valenciennes | 119 | (13) |
| 1979–1981 | Lille | 57 | (3) |
| 1981–1983 | Nice | 64 | (5) |
| 1983–1984 | Roubaix | 20 | (0) |
| 1984–1987 | Beauvais | | |

Managerial career
- 1987–1988: Beauvais (youth team)
- 1988–1992: Beauvais
- 1992–1993: Lille
- 1993–1994: Valenciennes
- 1995–1998: Sedan
- 1998–1999: Valence
- 2000: Guinea
- 2000–2002: Senegal
- 2002–2004: Al Ain
- 2004–2006: Al-Gharafa
- 2006: Al-Ittihad
- 2006–2008: United Arab Emirates
- 2008–2011: Qatar
- 2011–2012: Al-Gharafa
- 2012: Al Wasl
Medal record
Men's football
Representing Senegal (as manager)
Africa Cup of Nations
| Runner-up | 2002 |
- * Club domestic league appearances and goals

Bruno Jean Cornil Metsu (28 January 1954 – 15 October 2013) was a French footballer and football manager. During his senior playing career from 1973 to 1987, he played for seven different clubs in France.

From 1988 until his death, he was the manager of a total of nine clubs in France and Persian Gulf region, the Guinea, Senegal, United Arab Emirates and Qatar national football teams. He coached Senegal to the quarter-finals of the 2002 FIFA World Cup, during which his team defeated defending champions France in the opening match of the tournament.

== Playing career ==
Before embarking on his career as a footballer, the teenaged Metsu worked as a courier on the docks of Dunkirk.

Metsu played as a midfielder. His career as a youth and senior player with eight different clubs was largely based in his native France. He had a three-year spell as a youth player in Belgium with Anderlecht. During his 14 years as a senior player between 1973 and 1987, all with French clubs, he played 366 Division 1 and Division 2 matches and 28 Coupe de France matches, scoring 30 goals in Division 1 and Division 2 matches and 2 goals in Coupe de France matches. While at Lille, Metsu played 63 matches and scored 3 goals in all competitions. Metsu had his heyday at Valenciennes between 1975 and 1979, scoring his highest number of club goals, 14 (in 134 league - all of them Division 1 - and Coupe de France matches), while playing alongside top players such as Didier Six and Roger Milla. After Metsu had finished playing his first season (1984–85) for Beauvais, it won promotion to Division 2.

== Managerial career ==
=== In France ===
Metsu spent over a decade as the manager of five different clubs in France before his first foray overseas as a football manager in the year 2000.

After retiring as a player with Beauvais in 1987, Metsu took up the youth team manager post with Beauvais in the same year. In 1988, he guided the Beauvais youth team to the runner-up position in the Coupe Gambardella. From 1988 to 1992, he was the manager of Beauvais's senior team, which was in Division 2 throughout his tenure there. In the 1988–1989 season, it reached the quarter-finals of the Coupe de France for the first time in its history, where it lost to Auxerre 2–1 on aggregate.

Metsu was appointed the manager of the Division 1 club Lille at the age of 38 on 1 July 1992. He was sacked on 28 February 1993 after it had managed to win just 5 of its first 27 Division 1 matches in the current season, the board summoning him to a meeting and inquiring: "So have you heard the gossip? We are letting you go." It was a crass way to sack a manager, especially one who prided himself on the strong bonds he formed in dressing rooms.

Metsu was appointed the manager of Valenciennes at the darkest point in that club's history, immediately after its relegation to Division 2 following the conclusion of the 1992–93 Division 1 season and in the wake of the discovery that some of its players had accepted bribes to throw a Division 1 match against Olympique de Marseille that was held on 20 May 1993. He lasted a year there, then had spells at Sedan (1995–1998) and Valence (1998–1999) before he applied successfully to become the manager of the Guinea national football team.

=== In Africa ===
==== Guinea ====
In the year 2000, Metsu became the manager of a national team for the first time when he took charge of the Guinea national football team after signing a modest contract. "Metsu complained of so many things in Guinea. Poor infrastructure, poor management by Guinea's football association and frequent meddling in his work," said Titi Camara, a former Guinea international who later became the country's sports minister. "At that time I felt like I had had too much of football but African players reinvigorated me," Metsu said in an interview with La Voix du Nord daily in 2011. The feeling was mutual, and Metsu left the Guinea post after less than one year on the job to become the manager of the Senegal national football team in the year 2000.

==== Senegal ====
After Metsu had settled in Senegal in the year 2000 to become the manager of the Senegal national football team, he took up the task of inspiring the Lions of Teranga (the nickname of the Senegalese national football team) to play better football. In February 2000, the Lions of Teranga had lost to co-hosts Nigeria 2–1 after extra-time in the quarter-finals of the 2000 Africa Cup of Nations.

Metsu immediately began fostering the esprit de corps that would fuel his Senegal side, recalling several players whom the Senegalese Football Federation did not want in the national team because of perceived indiscipline. He did not manage the team with an iron fist. Instead, he rallied the players around the belief that together they could do something special. Metsu's relaxed but inspiring coaching style quickly whipped his team into shape to the admiration of both fans and officials. He outstandingly led Senegal to the championship final (the first-ever in its history) of the 2002 Africa Cup of Nations held in Mali. Although they lost to Cameroon 3–2 on penalties, the White Sorcerer, his sobriquet given by the local press, and his charges were given a red carpet reception when they arrived back home in Dakar.

Metsu guided Senegal to seal a spot in the 2002 World Cup finals for the first time in its history. They were expected to finish at the bottom of Group A, which also contained Denmark, two-time winners Uruguay and 1998 champions France. When the 2002 World Cup finals started, 21 of the 23 players in the Senegal national squad were playing with French clubs. Some members of the French team, as well as high-profile players of other teams, publicly dismissed the Senegalese. In a passionate speech to his team before the opening match of the tournament (France versus Senegal), Metsu used the disparaging comments to stir his players. Metsu's psychological approach to the game led him to encourage Senegal's players to focus on France's weaknesses rather than their strengths; he used videos to show the Senegalese players all the weaknesses of the French players. Senegal pulled off a major surprise by beating the reigning world and European champions 1–0, with Pape Bouba Diop scoring the only goal. "By concentrating five players in midfield, my friend Metsu concocted a nice plan. Individually and collectively, we could not find a solution. Senegal were better than us," conceded the France team manager Roger Lemerre, who was magnanimous in defeat. "When I read them Pelé's remarks that Senegal was the weakest team of the group, I immediately noticed a revolt in their eyes. I knew they were going to fight like lions," Metsu told the Nigerian newspaper Vanguard later that year.

Metsu's team drew their remaining Group A matches with Denmark (1–1) and Uruguay (3–3). Senegal finished Group A in second position and thus qualified for the round of 16. In this round, it beat Sweden 2–1 after extra time thanks to the two goals scored by Henri Camara, one of which was the golden goal scored in the 104th minute. Senegal thus became the first African side to reach the quarter-finals since Cameroon in 1990. Senegal were finally beaten 1–0 in the quarter-finals by Turkey after extra time, thanks to İlhan Mansız's golden goal. After losing the match against Turkey, Metsu faced unprecedented criticism from the Senegalese press, which blamed him for fielding players it described as tired and worn out against Turkey. Some Senegalese officials, football players and fans opined that Senegal would have progressed from the quarterfinals had Metsu used the right men from the start of the Senegal-Turkey match and made substitutions during that match.

After Senegal had defeated France in the opening match of the 2002 World Cup finals, Senegalese president Abdoulaye Wade declared a national holiday. When the Senegal national football team returned to Dakar following their exit from the 2002 World Cup finals, they were given a heroes' welcome. Metsu's connection to the country had been sealed when he married a Muslim by the name of Rokhaya 'Daba' Ndiaye, one day after he had converted from Christianity to Islam in Senegal. She changed her name to Viviane Dièye Metsu after the marriage. After his conversion to Islam, he called himself Abdulkarim Metsu and a fair part of the Senegalese press addressed him as Abdulkarim.

Metsu was mostly described in Senegal as a coach who inculcated the culture of courage and relentlessness in the Lions of Teranga, which subsequently influenced the junior ranks and the nation's club sides. Metsu brought a new spirit that inspired the nation's football and aroused young talent to see themselves as giants anywhere.

Metsu left his post as the manager of the Senegal national team in 2002, at the height of differences with the country's football officials. When asked if he was leaving the continent a frustrated man, he replied, "No, never! I learnt life here. I honed my skills as a coach here. I made a name here and pushed the doors open to the wide world."

=== In the Arabian Gulf region ===
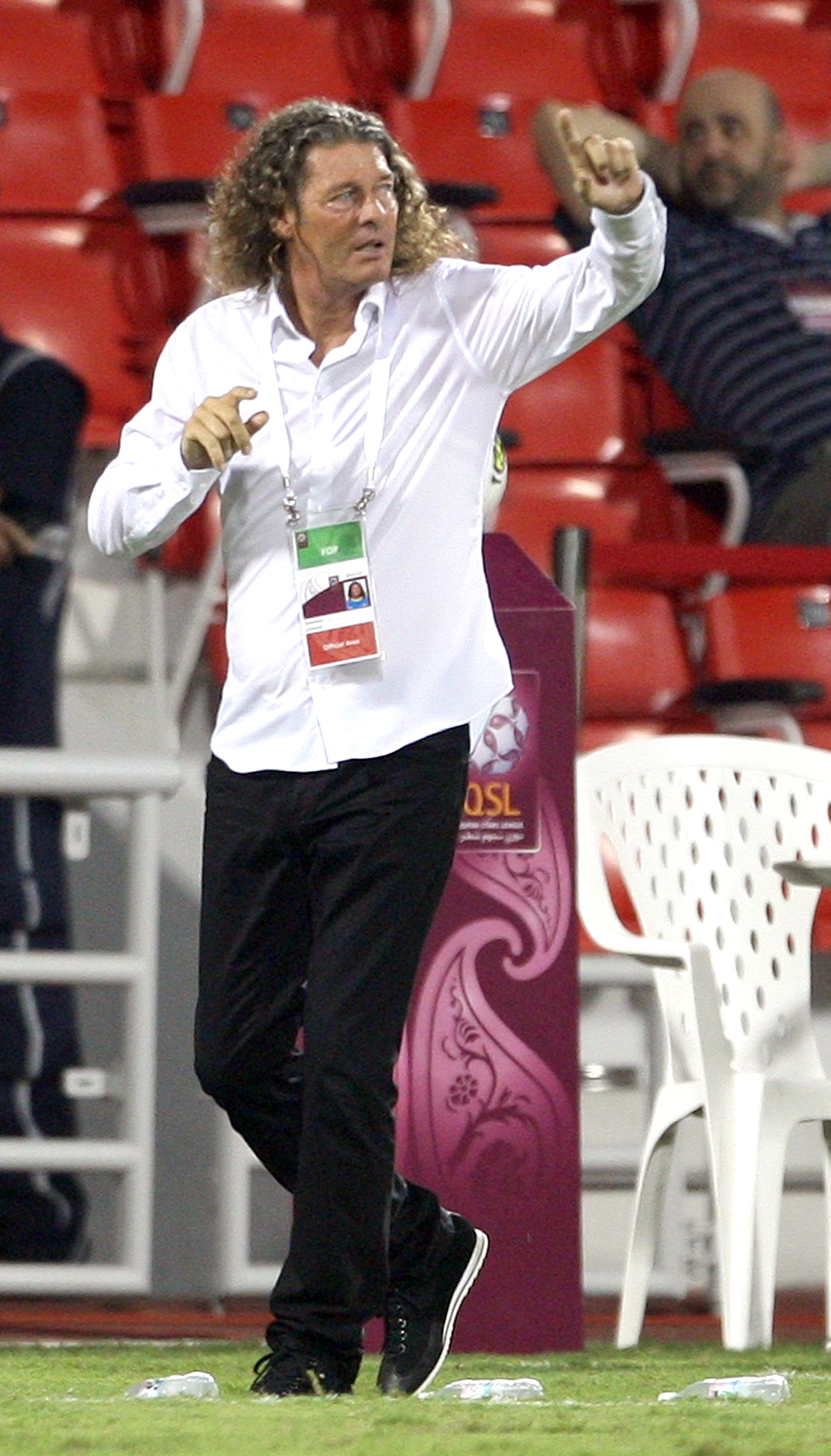
Metsu managing Al-Gharafa in 2011.

==== Al Ain ====
Metsu's success with Senegal led him to the United Arab Emirates, where in August 2002 he took up a lucrative job as head coach of the UAE Football League defending champions Al Ain, owned by the emir of Abu Dhabi. He coach the club to win the re-branded 2002–03 AFC Champions League(its maiden title), and completed a double by winning the UAE Football League in the same year. Al Ain retained the UAE Football League title in 2004. This led to a host of offers for the Frenchman, who left Al Ain FC in May 2004 to join the Qatari club Al-Gharafa in July 2004 as manager, to the resentment of Al Ain FC. Metsu was eventually forced to pay a fine for breach of contract.

==== Al-Gharafa (first spell) ====
In 2005, Metsu coached his new club to the Qatar Stars League title in his first season, with a 14-point winning margin over the second-placed Al Rayyan SC. However, with players in the league contracted to the Qatar National Olympic Committee rather than to their clubs, the side was dismantled, with Marcel Desailly "transferred" from Al-Gharafa to Qatar SC. Metsu maintains that the Crown Prince of Qatar, who was the chairman of Qatar's National Olympic Committee, orchestrated the moves due to his unhappiness at his club, Al-Sadd SC, being dethroned as the Qatar Stars League champions by Al-Gharafa. He nevertheless led his side to victory in the 2005–2006 Sheikh Jassem Cup, but conditions had deteriorated to the point that he left the club in April 2006.

==== Al-Ittihad ====
Next up for Metsu was a brief stint in 2006 in Saudi Arabia, where the six-time Saudi Professional League champions Al-Ittihad were currently only in fifth place in the 2005–06 Saudi Premier League table and were in danger of missing out on the four-team, three-match playoff for the league title. Metsu was handed a one-month contract by the club president, Mansour Al-Bilawi, to help the club qualify for the playoffs. He coached the club to finish in third position in the league table. Al-Ittihad lost its second playoff match against Al-Hilal FC and thus failed to advance to the final playoff match.

==== United Arab Emirates ====
Metsu returned to the UAE as the national team's manager in 2006, coaching his side to victory in the 18th Arabian Gulf Cup in front of a packed stadium in Abu Dhabi on 30 January 2007. It was the country's first Arabian Gulf Cup win, with Metsu achieving what former national team bosses had all failed to do.

The UAE crashed out of the 2007 AFC Asian Cup after finishing third in a group containing Japan, regional rivals Qatar and co-hosts Vietnam with one win and two losses; especially shocking was the 0-2 loss in the opening match to Vietnam. Despite his contract lasting until 2010, Metsu resigned from his post on 22 September 2008 after the UAE suffered defeats in their first two matches of the 2010 World Cup qualification - AFC fourth round Group B. Metsu's overall record with the UAE was 13 wins (11 official), 9 draws (3 official) and 20 losses (8 official) in 42 matches (22 official), scoring 47 goals and conceding 59.

==== Qatar ====
On 25 September 2008, Metsu returned to Qatar, accepting a job as manager of the Qatar national team. The country hosted the 2011 AFC Asian Cup in January 2011. In the latter tournament, Qatar finished second in their group with two wins and a defeat before it was beaten 3–2 by Japan in the quarter-finals on 21 January 2011, resulting in Metsu's sacking in February 2011.

==== Al-Gharafa (second spell) ====
Metsu did not have to wait long for a new job. He was appointed the manager of Al-Gharafa in March 2011 on a three-year contract, returning to the club that he had guided to win the Qatar Stars League in 2005. His club won the 2011 Qatar Crown Prince Cup in April 2011. Metsu was sacked from his post on 15 March 2012, just one year into his contract, due to poor results including a disheartening 5–1 home defeat to Al Rayyan that caused the team to drop to seventh place in the Qatar Stars League standings.

==== Al Wasl ====
Metsu was contacted by the Senegalese Football Federation (FSF) in February 2012 about his possible return to the manager post of the Senegal national football team. He was linked to the head coach job of the Iranian side Persepolis in June 2012 but it was eventually filled by Manuel José. On 12 July 2012, Metsu was named as the new Al Wasl FC head coach, replacing Diego Maradona, who had been sacked two days earlier. On 26 October 2012, he resigned from Al Wasl after being hospitalised in Dubai due to stomach cancer.

== Death and funeral ==
In October 2012, three months after replacing Diego Maradona at Al Wasl FC, Metsu was diagnosed with primary colon cancer, with the cancer already having metastasised to his lungs and liver. At the time of diagnosis, the cancer was already in the terminal stage and he was given three months to live. He underwent chemotherapy to treat the cancer. He spent the last few months of his life combating the cancer in his native commune of Coudekerque-Village in northern France. Metsu succumbed to the cancer and died on 15 October 2013 at Clinique des Flandres in Coudekerque-Branche. He was survived by his wife, Viviane Dièye Metsu, and their three children, as well as a son by his first wife.

Tributes were paid by athletes, politicians and other sporting figures including football manager Claude Le Roy, French minister of sports Valérie Fourneyron, Senegal striker Souleymane Camara and Senegalese President Macky Sall.

On 18 October 2013, the French city of Dunkirk organised a public ceremony to honour Metsu's memory. It was held around Metsu's coffin at the Salle Pierre Delaporte inside the Stade des Flandres and was attended by about 400 people, including Metsu's widow and sister, Senegal's ambassador to France and the Mayor of Dunkirk.

On 21 October 2013, Metsu was given an Islamic funeral in the Senegalese capital, Dakar. His widow Viviane, their three children, Senegalese president Macky Sall, Senegalese National Assembly president Moustapha Niasse, and several notable Senegalese footballers such as El Hadji Diouf, Khalilou Fadiga, Aliou Cissé, and Ferdinand Coly were among those who attended the funeral held at a Dakar hospital – l'Hôpital Principal de Dakar. Metsu's coffin was draped in the Senegalese flag and the green flag of Islam. During the funeral, Sall described Metsu as "a model of humanity and virtue" and a "hero among Senegalese heroes". Metsu was later buried in the Muslim cemetery of Yoff.

== Honours as a manager ==
Al-Ain

- UAE Football League: 2002–03, 2003–04
- UAE Super Cup: 2003
- AFC Champions League: 2002–03

Al-Gharafa

- Qatar Stars League: 2004–05
- Sheikh Jassem Cup: 2005–06
- Qatar Crown Prince Cup: 2011
- Emir of Qatar Cup runner-up: 2006, 2011

Senegal

- African Cup of Nations runner-up: 2002

United Arab Emirates

- Arabian Gulf Cup: 2007
