= Waleed Jassem =

Qatari footballer (born 1986)

Personal information
- Full name: Waleed Jassem Abdulla Jasemi
- Date of birth: August 2, 1986 (age 40)
- Place of birth: Doha, Qatar
- Height: 1.77 m (5 ft 9 1/2 in)
- Position: Midfielder

Senior career*
Years	Team	Apps	(Gls)
2002–2003	Al-Ahli	20	(1)
2003–2008	Al Rayyan	99	(77)
2008–2009	Qatar Sports Club	12	(6)
2009–2013	Lekhwiya	14	(0)
2013–2016	Al Kharaitiyat SC	14	(5)

International career
2001–2014	Qatar	21	(6)
- * Club domestic league appearances and goals

Waleed Jassem Abdulla Jasemi (born on August 2, 1986) is a Qatari footballer. He plays as a midfielder for Lekhwiya. He is a member of the Qatar national football team.

== Career ==
Jassem started his career with Al-Ahli under the supervision of coach Abdul Qader and blossomed into a focused player. At the end of the 2002–03 season, he transferred to Al-Rayyan after experiencing problems with the Ahli administration.

At Al-Rayyan, he highlighted his talent with many great international players like Fernando Hierro and Mario Basler. He was also able to put up a good partnership with Moroccan playmaker Boushaib el Mubaraki in the Rayyani midfield. In recent years after the departure of many stars Waleed became the backbone of the Rayyan team. Even though Waleed put up inspiring performances along with the likes of Jose Fumagalli and Youssef Mukhtari, Al-Rayyan could not succeed in the league. With so many disappointing seasons, in 2008, Waleed decided to move to Qatar Sports Club.

== International career ==
Waleed played for Qatar in the Asian Youth Championship before breaking into the senior team. He made his debut for the senior national team in 2001, at the age of 15, becoming one of the youngest debuts in the history of the national team. His most important role for the team came in 2004 when he played a superb role in Qatar's road to Gulf Cup 17 glory. Though he played in the 2007 Asian Cup he failed to get into new coach Jorge Fossati's preferred line-up. Many fans were surprised why his exploits with Rayyan couldn't get him into the team.
