= Issa Ali =

Emirati footballer (born 1981)

Personal information
- Date of birth: April 2, 1981 (age 45)
- Height: 1.80 m (5 ft 11 in)
- Position: Midfielder

Senior career*
Years	Team	Apps	(Gls)
2002–2013	Al-Wasl	45	(25)
2013–2014	Al-Shaab CSC	20	(1)
Total		65	(26)

International career
2007–2009	United Arab Emirates	7	(0)
Medal record
First place	UAE Pro League	2007
First place	UAE President's Cup	2007
First place	GCC Champions League	2010
Second place	GCC Champions League	2005
Second place	GCC Champions League	2012
- * Club domestic league appearances and goals

Issa Ali Al-Balochi (Arabic: عيسى علي البلوشي; born 2 April 1981) is an Emirati footballer who played at the 2007 AFC Asian Cup.
