= Ali Hassan Al-Thani =

Bahraini footballer

Ali Hassan
Personal information
- Full name: Ali Hassan Al-Thani
- Date of birth: 16 August 1972 (age 54)
- Place of birth: Bahrain
- Height: 1.78 m (5 ft 10 in)
- Position: Goalkeeper

Senior career*
Years	Team	Apps	(Gls)
1992–2011	Muharraq	154	(0)
2011–2015	Bahrain	43	(0)

International career
1997–2007	Bahrain	37	(0)
- * Club domestic league appearances and goals

Ali Hassan Al-Thani is a Bahraini footballer who played at 2007 AFC Asian Cup.
