= Phùng Văn Nhiên =

Vietnamese footballer

Personal information
- Full name: Phùng Văn Nhiên
- Date of birth: 23 November 1982 (age 43)
- Place of birth: Vụ Bản, Nam Định, Vietnam
- Height: 1.70 m (5 ft 7 in)
- Position: Defender

Youth career
- 1993–2001: Nam Định

Senior career*
| Years | Team | Apps | (Gls) |
| 2002–2008 | Nam Định | 106 | (1) |
| 2008–2014 | Hoàng Anh Gia Lai | 76 | (0) |
| 2014–2017 | Hải Phòng | 55 | (3) |
| 2020–2021 | Nam Định | 5 | (0) |
| Total | | 242 | (4) |

International career
| 2003–2013 | Vietnam | 21 | (0) |
- * Club domestic league appearances and goals

Phùng Văn Nhiên (born 23 November 1982) is a Vietnamese former footballer who played as a defender. He was also a farmer.

He began his career with Nam Dinh. He then spent most of his career with mixed successes at Hoang Anh Gia Lai and Hai Phong.
