= Rashid Abdulrahman =

United Arab Emirati footballer (born 1975)

Personal information
- Full name: Rashid Abdulrahman Al Hosani
- Date of birth: 20 October 1975 (age 51)
- Place of birth: United Arab Emirates
- Height: 1.79 m (5 ft 10 in)
- Position: Centre-back

Senior career*
Years	Team	Apps	(Gls)
1993–2005	Al-Shaab		
2005	Yverdon		
2006–2011	Al-Jazira Club		
2011–2012	Ajman Club	12	(0)

International career
2004–2008	United Arab Emirates	38	(2)
- * Club domestic league appearances and goals

Rashid Abdulrahman Al Hosani (born 20 October 1975) is an Emirati former footballer who played as a centre-back for the United Arab Emirates national football team.
