= Abdulrahim Jumaa =

Emirati footballer (born 1979)

Personal information
- Full name: Abdulrahim Anbar Jumaa
- Date of birth: May 23, 1979 (age 47)
- Position: Midfielder

International career
Years	Team	Apps	(Gls)
1998–2009	United Arab Emirates	115	(8)

Abdulrahim Anbar Jumaa (Arabic: عَبْد الرَّحِيم عَنْبَر جُمْعَة; born 23 May 1979) is an Emirati footballer who played as a midfielder.

Jumaa has frequently captained the United Arab Emirates national football team and led the team to their first trophy, the 2007 Gulf Cup held in Abu Dhabi. He has made 27 appearances in qualifying matches for various FIFA World Cups, adding to a total of 116 caps, one of the highest among UAE internationals.

== See also ==
- List of men's footballers with 100 or more international caps
