= Huỳnh Phúc Hiệp =

Vietnamese footballer (born 1988)

Personal information
- Full name: Huỳnh Phúc Hiệp
- Date of birth: April 12, 1988 (age 38)
- Place of birth: Gò Công, Tiền Giang, Vietnam
- Height: 1.73 m (5 ft 8 in)
- Position: Striker

Team information
- Current team: Tiền Giang
- Number: 16

Youth career
- 1999–2005: Tiền Giang

Senior career*
Years	Team	Apps	(Gls)
2006–2010	Tiền Giang	50	(5)
2011	Hồ Chí Minh City	6	(3)
2012–2013	Xuân Thành Sài Gòn	19	(0)
2013	Kiên Giang	31	(0)
2014–2015	Hồ Chí Minh City	19	(0)
2016–	Tiền Giang	147	(24)

International career
2007–2008	Vietnam U21	1	(0)
2008–2009	Vietnam U23	3	(0)
2007–2016	Vietnam	12	(0)
- * Club domestic league appearances and goals

Huỳnh Phúc Hiệp (born 12 April 1988 in Tiền Giang, Vietnam) is a Vietnamese footballer who is a striker for Tiền Giang. He was called to Vietnamese internationals, played at the 2007 AFC Asian Cup.
