= Yousif Jaber =

Emirati footballer (born 1985)

Personal information
- Full name: Yousif Jaber Naser Al-Hammadi
- Date of birth: 25 February 1985 (age 41)
- Place of birth: Abu Dhabi, United Arab Emirates
- Height: 1.83 m (6 ft 0 in)
- Positions: Midfielder; defender

Senior career*
Years	Team	Apps	(Gls)
2003–2007	Baniyas	94	(24)
2007–2010	Al-Ahli	58	(6)
2010–2019	Baniyas	190	(21)
2019–2024	Shabab Al-Ahli	59	(9)

International career
2007–2021	United Arab Emirates	47	(2)
- * Club domestic league appearances and goals as of 25 May 2019

Yousif Jaber Naser Al-Hammadi (born February 25, 1985) is an association football player from the United Arab Emirates. He is a left foot player and handle main position on the field as left back and other position at left midfield.
