= Hilal Saeed =

Emirati footballer (born 1982)

Personal information
- Full name: Hilal Saeed Obaid; S. Al Dhanhani Mesmari
- Date of birth: March 24, 1982 (age 44)
- Place of birth: United Arab Emirates
- Height: 1.88 m (6 ft 2 in)
- Position: Centre back

Youth career
- Al-Fujairah

Senior career*
Years	Team	Apps	(Gls)
???–2007	Al-Fujairah		
2007–2010	Al-Ain	29	(1)
2010–2015	Al-Nasr	73	(3)
2015–2016	Emirates		
2016–2021	Al-Fujairah		
- * Club domestic league appearances and goals

Hilal Saeed (born March 24, 1982) is an Emirati footballer who plays as a defender .

== Club career ==
Hilal was transferred to Al-Ain from Al-Fujairah in 2007, and quickly won his place in the starting eleven throughout the season and had an impressive season. Not only did Hilal improve the defence, but also the attack where he would help in set pieces due to his heading abilities. His only goal with Al-Ain was against fellow rivals Al-Wahda.
