= Nguyễn Minh Chuyên =

Vietnamese footballer

Personal information
- Full name: Nguyễn Minh Chuyên
- Date of birth: November 9, 1985 (age 40)
- Place of birth: Phan Thiết, Bình Thuận, Vietnam
- Height: 1.72 m (5 ft 8 in)
- Position: Midfielder

Youth career
- 1996–2002: Bình Thuận

Senior career*
| Years | Team | Apps | (Gls) |
| 2003–2005 | Bình Thuận | 3 | (0) |
| 2005–2009 | Sài Gòn Port | 29 | (0) |
| 2009–2011 | Hồ Chí Minh City | 32 | (2) |
| 2011–2012 | Becamex Bình Dương | 25 | (2) |
| 2012–2013 | Xuân Thành Sài Gòn | 6 | (0) |

International career
| 2005–2008 | Vietnam U23 | 6 | (0) |
| 2006–2011 | Vietnam | 6 | (0) |
- * Club domestic league appearances and goals

Nguyễn Minh Chuyên (born 9 November 1985) is a Vietnamese footballer who played as a midfielder.
