= Amer Mubarak =

Emirati footballer (born 1987)

Personal information
- Full name: Amer Mubarak Al-Hammadi
- Date of birth: December 28, 1987 (age 38)
- Place of birth: Abu Dhabi, UAE
- Height: 1.75 m (5 ft 9 in)
- Position: Midfielder

Senior career*
Years	Team	Apps	(Gls)
2005–2011	Al-Nasr	?	(?)
2011–2014	Al-Ahli	44	(0)
2014–2020	Al-Nasr	79	(1)
2020	→ Baniyas (loan)	4	(0)
2020–2023	Khor Fakkan	44	(0)

International career
2007–2011	United Arab Emirates	42	(1)
- * Club domestic league appearances and goals

Amer Mubarak (Arabic: عامر مبارك; born 28 December 1987 in United Arab Emirates) is an Emirati footballer who plays as a midfielder. He was called to United Arab Emirates national football team at 2011 AFC Asian Cup and 2014 FIFA World Cup qualification.
