= Haider Alo Ali =

Emirati footballer (born 1979)

Haider Alo Ali (Arabic: حيدر ألو علي محمد)
Personal information
- Date of birth: December 25, 1979 (age 46)
- Height: 1.76 m (5 ft 9 in)
- Position: Defender

Senior career*
Years	Team	Apps	(Gls)
1998–2012	Al Wahda FC	144	(27)
2012–2018	Emirates Club	97	(3)
Total		241	(30)

International career
2000–2010	United Arab Emirates	71	(3)
Medal record
First place	UAE Pro League	1999
First place	UAE Pro League	2001
First place	UAE Pro League	2005
First place	UAE Pro League	2010
First place	UAE President's Cup	2010
First place	UAE Super Cup	2002
First place	UAE Super Cup	2011
First place	UAE Federation Cup	2001
- * Club domestic league appearances and goals

Haider Alo Ali Mohamed (Arabic: حيدر ألو علي محمد; born 25 December 1979) is an Emirati footballer, who played at 2007 AFC Asian Cup.
