= Nguyễn Huy Hoàng (football) =

Vietnamese footballer

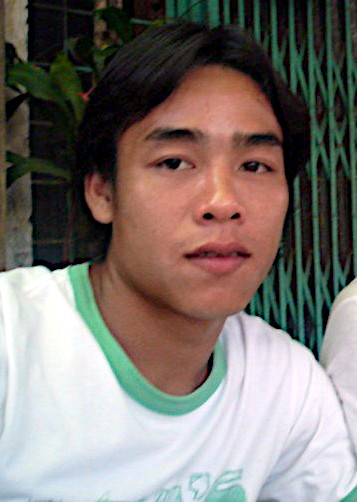

Personal information
- Full name: Nguyễn Huy Hoàng
- Date of birth: 4 January 1981 (age 45)
- Place of birth: Quỳnh Lưu, Nghệ An, Vietnam
- Height: 1.74 m (5 ft 9 in)
- Position: Full back

Youth career
- 1995–1997: Sông Lam Nghệ An

Senior career*
Years	Team	Apps	(Gls)
1998–2013	Sông Lam Nghệ An	93	(12)
2013–2014	XSKT Cần Thơ	18	(0)
Total		111	(12)

International career
2000–2003	Vietnam U23	10	(0)
2002–2010	Vietnam	35	(1)

Managerial career
- 2021–2023: Sông Lam Nghệ An
- * Club domestic league appearances and goals

Nguyễn Huy Hoàng (born 4 January 1981), is a Vietnamese former football player, playing for Sông Lam Nghệ An ever since he started his professional career. He was called up in the national team in 2002 and had participated in Vietnam's first encounter in the AFC Asian Cup in 2007. He is now the head coach of Sông Lam Nghệ An. He retired from international football in 2008 but come back in 2010 to participate in the 2010 AFF Suzuki Cup.

== International goals ==
#	Date	Venue	Opponent	Score	Result	Competition
1.	9 December 2004	Ho Chi Minh City, Vietnam	Cambodia	6–1	9–1	2004 Tiger Cup
