= Mohamed Al-Shehhi =

Emirati footballer (born 1988)

Mohamed AlShehii
Personal information
- Full name: Mohamed Saeed Rashid Al-Shehii
- Date of birth: 28 March 1988 (age 38)
- Place of birth: UAE
- Height: 1.77 m (5 ft 10 in)
- Position: Winger

Youth career
- Al-Wahda

Senior career*
Years	Team	Apps	(Gls)
2006–2018	Al-Wahda	178	(36)
2016–2017	→ Al Dhafra (loan)	14	(1)
2018–2020	Al-Sharjah	26	(2)
2020–2021	Ittihad Kalba	6	(0)

International career^{‡}
2003	United Arab Emirates U-17	12	(10)
2003–2018	United Arab Emirates	56	(10)
- * Club domestic league appearances and goals as of 20 February 2010 ‡ National team caps and goals as of 20 February 2010

Mohamed Saeed al-Shehii (Arabic: محمد سعيد راشد الشحي; born March 28, 1988) is a professional Emirati footballer. He currently plays as a winger. He is nicknamed The الوضيحي

== Honours ==
Individual

- UAE League: Rookie Of the Year 2006 - 2007.
- UAE League:Best Emirati Player 2007 - 2008.
