= Football at the 2006 Asian Games – Men's team squads =

Below are the squads for the men's football tournament at the 2006 Asian Games, played in Doha, Qatar.

== Bahrain ==
Coach: (Bosnia and Herzegovina) Senad Kreso

No.	Pos.	Player	Date of birth (age)	Club
2	DF	Mohamed Husain	31 July 1980 (aged 26)	(Bahrain Football Association) Al-Ahli
11	FW	Abdulla Al-Dakeel	3 June 1985 (aged 21)	(Bahrain Football Association) Al-Muharraq
16	DF	Sayed Mohamed Adnan	5 February 1983 (aged 23)	(Qatar Football Association) Al-Khor
21	GK	Sayed Mohammed Jaffer	25 August 1985 (aged 21)	(Bahrain Football Association) Al-Malkiya
24	MF	Hamad Rakea Al-Anezi	22 April 1984 (aged 22)	(Bahrain Football Association) Al-Riffa
25	MF	Faouzi Mubarak Aaish	27 February 1985 (aged 21)	(Bahrain Football Association) Al-Muharraq
27	MF	Ali Aamer	26 December 1977 (aged 28)	(Bahrain Football Association) Al-Muharraq
28	FW	Ismail Abdullatif	11 September 1986 (aged 20)	(Bahrain Football Association) Al-Hala
32	DF	Jasim Al-Chuban	9 November 1983 (aged 23)	(Bahrain Football Association) Al-Muharraq
43	MF	Mahmood Abdulrahman	22 November 1984 (aged 22)	(Bahrain Football Association) Al-Muharraq
45	GK	Abbas Ahmed Khamis	13 June 1983 (aged 23)	(Bahrain Football Association) Sitra
49	MF	Mahmood Qayed	13 September 1984 (aged 22)	(Bahrain Football Association) Al-Ahli
50	DF	Alaa Ayyad	31 July 1985 (aged 21)	(Bahrain Football Association) Al-Ahli
51	MF	Husain Al-Shekar	5 February 1985 (aged 21)	(Bahrain Football Association) Al-Ahli
52	MF	Mahmood Ayyad	12 June 1985 (aged 21)	(Bahrain Football Association) Al-Ahli
53	DF	Abbas Ayyad	11 May 1987 (aged 19)	(Bahrain Football Association) Al-Ahli
57	DF	Abdullah Omar	1 January 1987 (aged 19)	(Bahrain Football Association) Al-Muharraq
58	FW	Jaycee John Okwunwanne	8 October 1985 (aged 21)	(Bahrain Football Association) Al-Muharraq
59	MF	Abdulla Baba Fatadi	2 November 1985 (aged 21)	(Bahrain Football Association) Al-Muharraq
60	DF	Ahmed Abdulla Ali	1 April 1987 (aged 19)	(Bahrain Football Association) East Riffa

== Bangladesh ==
Coach: Hasanuzzaman Khan Bablu

No.	Pos.	Player	Date of birth (age)	Club
1	GK	M. N. Shakil	26 October 1986 (aged 20)	(Bangladesh Football Federation) Arambagh Krira Sangha
2	DF	Mohiuddin Ibnul Siraji	25 July 1985 (aged 21)	(Bangladesh Football Federation) Brothers Union
3	DF	Wali Faisal	1 March 1985 (aged 21)	(Bangladesh Football Federation) Abahani Limited Dhaka
4	DF	Rajani Kanta Barman	12 May 1976 (aged 30)	(Bangladesh Football Federation) Muktijoddha Sangsad
5	DF	Kazi Nazrul Islam	16 October 1978 (aged 28)	(Bangladesh Football Federation) Mohammedan Dhaka
6	DF	Mohammed Ariful Islam	20 December 1987 (aged 18)	(Bangladesh Football Federation) Fakirerpool Young Men's Club
7	MF	Motiur Rahman Munna	1 September 1979 (aged 27)	(Bangladesh Football Federation) Mohammedan Dhaka
8	MF	Arman Aziz	10 May 1984 (aged 22)	(Bangladesh Football Federation) Mohammedan Dhaka
9	FW	Mehedi Hasan Ujjal	26 April 1985 (aged 21)	(Bangladesh Football Federation) Abahani Limited Dhaka
10	FW	Zahid Hasan Ameli	25 December 1987 (aged 18)	(Bangladesh Football Federation) Brothers Union
11	FW	Mohammed Robin	14 June 1987 (aged 19)	(Bangladesh Football Federation) Fakirerpool Young Men's Club
12	FW	Mithun Chowdhury	10 February 1989 (aged 17)	(Bangladesh Football Federation) Victoria
13	DF	Firoj Mahmud Titu	8 July 1974 (aged 32)	(Bangladesh Football Federation) Muktijoddha Sangsad
14	DF	Zahirul Islam Zahir	28 June 1985 (aged 21)	(Bangladesh Football Federation) Farashganj
15	DF	Arafat Ali Rony	12 May 1989 (aged 17)	(Bangladesh Football Federation) Mohammedan Dhaka
16	MF	Abul Hossain	29 July 1983 (aged 23)	(Bangladesh Football Federation) Brothers Union
17	MF	Faisal Mahmud	16 January 1983 (aged 23)	(Bangladesh Football Federation) Arambagh Krira Sangha
18	MF	Anamul Haque Sharif	9 December 1985 (aged 20)	(Bangladesh Football Federation) Mohammedan Dhaka
19	MF	Mohamed Zahid Hossain	15 June 1988 (aged 18)	(Bangladesh Football Federation) Mohammedan Dhaka
20	GK	Mazharul Islam Himel	16 September 1988 (aged 18)	(Bangladesh Football Federation) Badda Jagarani Sangsad

== China ==
Coach: (Serbia) Ratomir Dujković

No.	Pos.	Player	Date of birth (age)	Club
1	GK	Wang Dalei	10 January 1989 (aged 17)	(Chinese Football Association) Shanghai United
2	DF	Tan Wangsong	19 December 1985 (aged 20)	(Chinese Football Association) Qingdao Zhongneng
4	DF	Liu Yu	12 May 1985 (aged 21)	(Chinese Football Association) Dalian Shide
5	DF	Feng Xiaoting	22 October 1985 (aged 21)	(Chinese Football Association) Dalian Shide
7	MF	Zhao Xuri	3 December 1985 (aged 20)	(Chinese Football Association) Dalian Shide
8	MF	Hao Junmin	24 March 1987 (aged 19)	(Chinese Football Association) Tianjin TEDA
9	MF	Zheng Zhi	20 August 1980 (aged 26)	(Chinese Football Association) Shandong Luneng Taishan
10	MF	Chen Tao	11 March 1985 (aged 21)	(Chinese Football Association) Changsha Ginde
11	FW	Zhu Ting	5 July 1985 (aged 21)	(Chinese Football Association) Dalian Shide
12	MF	Wang Yongpo	19 January 1987 (aged 19)	(Chinese Football Association) Shandong Luneng Taishan
13	DF	Sun Xiang	15 January 1982 (aged 24)	(Chinese Football Association) Shanghai Shenhua
15	MF	Shen Longyuan	2 March 1985 (aged 21)	(Chinese Football Association) Shanghai Shenhua
16	MF	Cui Peng	31 May 1987 (aged 19)	(Chinese Football Association) Shandong Luneng Taishan
17	DF	Zhang Ke	20 March 1985 (aged 21)	(Chinese Football Association) Changsha Ginde
18	GK	Guan Zhen	6 February 1985 (aged 21)	(Chinese Football Association) Chengdu Blades
19	FW	Gao Lin	14 February 1986 (aged 20)	(Chinese Football Association) Shanghai Shenhua
20	MF	Zhou Haibin	19 July 1985 (aged 21)	(Chinese Football Association) Shandong Luneng Taishan
23	DF	Zhao Ming	3 October 1987 (aged 19)	(Chinese Football Association) Yanbian Funde

== Hong Kong ==
Coach: Lai Sun Cheung

No.	Pos.	Player	Date of birth (age)	Club
1	GK	Tse Tak Him	10 February 1985 (aged 21)	(Football Association of Hong Kong, China) Citizen
2	DF	Lin Junsheng	8 January 1985 (aged 21)	(Football Association of Hong Kong, China) Kitchee
3	DF	Gerard Ambassa Guy	21 September 1978 (aged 28)	(Football Association of Hong Kong, China) Happy Valley
4	DF	Li Hang Wui	15 February 1985 (aged 21)	(Football Association of Hong Kong, China) HKFC
5	DF	Cheung Tsz Kin	26 March 1983 (aged 23)	(Football Association of Hong Kong, China) Kitchee
6	DF	Tse Man Wing	5 January 1983 (aged 23)	(Football Association of Hong Kong, China) Xiangxue Sun Hei
7	MF	Yip Chi Ho	21 October 1985 (aged 21)	(Football Association of Hong Kong, China) Rangers
8	MF	Kwok Kin Pong	30 March 1987 (aged 19)	(Football Association of Hong Kong, China) South China
9	FW	Cheng Lai Hin	31 March 1986 (aged 20)	(Football Association of Hong Kong, China) HKFC
10	MF	Lam Ka Wai	5 June 1985 (aged 21)	(Football Association of Hong Kong, China) Rangers
11	MF	Sham Kwok Keung	10 September 1985 (aged 21)	(Football Association of Hong Kong, China) Happy Valley
12	DF	Lo Kwan Yee	9 October 1984 (aged 22)	(Football Association of Hong Kong, China) Rangers
13	DF	Cheung Kin Fung	1 January 1984 (aged 22)	(Football Association of Hong Kong, China) Kitchee
14	DF	Sham Kwok Fai	30 May 1984 (aged 22)	(Football Association of Hong Kong, China) Happy Valley
15	DF	Chan Wai Ho	24 April 1982 (aged 24)	(Football Association of Hong Kong, China) Rangers
16	MF	Leung Chun Pong	1 October 1986 (aged 20)	(Football Association of Hong Kong, China) Citizen
17	MF	Chan Man Fai	19 June 1988 (aged 18)	(Football Association of Hong Kong, China) Hong Kong 08
18	FW	Chan Siu Ki	14 July 1985 (aged 21)	(Football Association of Hong Kong, China) Kitchee
19	GK	Fan Chun Yip	1 May 1976 (aged 30)	(Football Association of Hong Kong, China) Happy Valley
20	DF	Liu Quankun	17 February 1983 (aged 23)	(Football Association of Hong Kong, China) Kitchee

== India ==
Coach: (England) Bob Houghton

No.	Pos.	Player	Date of birth (age)	Club
1	GK	Subrata Pal	24 November 1986 (aged 20)	(All India Football Federation) Mohun Bagan
2	DF	N. S. Manju	9 May 1987 (aged 19)	(All India Football Federation) Mahindra United
3	MF	Steven Dias	25 December 1983 (aged 22)	(All India Football Federation) Mahindra United
4	DF	Debabrata Roy	4 November 1986 (aged 20)	(All India Football Federation) East Bengal
5	DF	Irungbam Surkumar Singh	21 March 1983 (aged 23)	(All India Football Federation) Mahindra United
6	DF	Habibur Rehman Mondal	27 May 1986 (aged 20)	(All India Football Federation) Mohammedan Kolkata
7	DF	Pappachen Pradeep	28 April 1983 (aged 23)	(All India Football Federation) Mahindra United
9	FW	Sunil Chhetri	3 August 1984 (aged 22)	(All India Football Federation) JCT Mills
10	FW	Manjit Singh	25 January 1986 (aged 20)	(All India Football Federation) Mahindra United
11	FW	Syed Rahim Nabi	14 December 1985 (aged 20)	(All India Football Federation) East Bengal
12	FW	Subhas Sumbhu Chakrobarty	23 October 1985 (aged 21)	(All India Football Federation) Mohun Bagan
13	MF	Bungo Singh	2 March 1983 (aged 23)	(All India Football Federation) Churchill Brothers
14	DF	Anupam Sarkar	6 December 1985 (aged 20)	(All India Football Federation) East Bengal
15	FW	Bhaichung Bhutia	15 December 1976 (aged 29)	(All India Football Federation) Mohun Bagan
16	MF	Gouramangi Singh	25 January 1986 (aged 20)	(All India Football Federation) Sporting Goa
18	FW	Sushil Kumar Singh	1 April 1989 (aged 17)	(All India Football Federation) Mohun Bagan
20	GK	Subhasish Roy Chowdhury	27 September 1986 (aged 20)	(All India Football Federation) Mahindra United
21	MF	Chitrasen Chandam	7 February 1986 (aged 20)	(All India Football Federation) Churchill Brothers
22	MF	Climax Lawrence	16 January 1979 (aged 27)	(All India Football Federation) Dempo
24	GK	Sandip Nandy	15 January 1975 (aged 31)	(All India Football Federation) Mahindra United

== Indonesia ==
Coach: (Netherlands) Foppe de Haan

No.	Pos.	Player	Date of birth (age)	Club
1	GK	Ferry Rotinsulu	28 December 1982 (aged 23)	(Football Association of Indonesia) Sriwijaya
3	DF	Zulkifli Syukur	3 May 1984 (aged 22)	(Football Association of Indonesia) PKT Bontang
4	MF	Hendra Ridwan	1 December 1985 (aged 21)	(Football Association of Indonesia) PKT Bontang
5	DF	Bobby Satria	24 August 1986 (aged 20)	(Football Association of Indonesia) Persita Tangerang
6	DF	Taufiq Kasrun	12 October 1985 (aged 21)	(Football Association of Indonesia) Persela Lamongan
7	MF	Tony Sucipto	12 February 1986 (aged 20)	(Football Association of Indonesia) Sriwijaya
8	FW	Andik Ardiansyah	19 April 1985 (aged 21)	(Football Association of Indonesia) Persekabpas Pasuruan
9	FW	Gherry Setya	21 December 1988 (aged 17)	(Football Association of Indonesia) Persmin Minahasa
10	FW	Jajang Mulyana	23 October 1988 (aged 18)	(Football Association of Indonesia) Pelita Jaya
11	MF	Ahmad Bustomi	13 July 1985 (aged 21)	(Football Association of Indonesia) Persema Malang
12	GK	Dian Agus	3 August 1985 (aged 21)	(Football Association of Indonesia) Persijap Jepara
13	MF	Ian Kabes	14 May 1986 (aged 20)	(Football Association of Indonesia) Persipura Jayapura
14	MF	Khomad Suharto	16 March 1985 (aged 21)	(Football Association of Indonesia) Persmin Minahasa
15	MF	Imam Rohmawan	15 March 1984 (aged 22)	(Football Association of Indonesia) Persis Solo
16	DF	Eko Prasetyo	22 August 1985 (aged 21)	(Football Association of Indonesia) PSIS Semarang
18	MF	Herman Romansyah	15 January 1986 (aged 20)	(Football Association of Indonesia) Persibo Bojonegoro
20	GK	Galih Sudaryono	4 January 1987 (aged 19)	(Football Association of Indonesia) Persiba Bantul
21	DF	Wahyu Wijiastanto	31 May 1986 (aged 20)	(Football Association of Indonesia) Persis Solo
22	DF	Ardan Aras	2 March 1984 (aged 22)	(Football Association of Indonesia) PSM Makassar
23	DF	Fandy Mochtar	19 May 1984 (aged 22)	(Football Association of Indonesia) Persiter Ternate

== Iran ==
Coach: (Brazil) René Simões

No.	Pos.	Player	Date of birth (age)	Club
1	GK	Alireza Haghighi	2 May 1988 (aged 18)	(Football Federation Islamic Republic of Iran) Persepolis Tehran
2	DF	Mohsen Arzani	23 September 1984 (aged 22)	(Football Federation Islamic Republic of Iran) Saipa Karaj
3	DF	Jalal Akbari	5 July 1983 (aged 23)	(Football Federation Islamic Republic of Iran) Sepahan Isfahan
4	DF	Jalal Hosseini	3 February 1982 (aged 24)	(Football Federation Islamic Republic of Iran) Saipa Karaj
5	DF	Pejman Montazeri	6 September 1983 (aged 23)	(Football Federation Islamic Republic of Iran) Foolad Khuzestan
6	MF	Behshad Yavarzadeh	7 January 1983 (aged 23)	(Football Federation Islamic Republic of Iran) Esteghlal Tehran
7	MF	Milad Nouri	3 May 1986 (aged 20)	(Football Federation Islamic Republic of Iran) Paykan Tehran
8	MF	Maziar Zare	22 December 1984 (aged 21)	(Football Federation Islamic Republic of Iran) Malavan Bandar Anzali
9	FW	Mehrdad Oladi	25 May 1985 (aged 21)	(Football Federation Islamic Republic of Iran) Persepolis Tehran
10	FW	Arash Borhani	14 September 1983 (aged 23)	(United Arab Emirates Football Association) Al-Nasr
11	FW	Mohammad Gholamin	11 February 1986 (aged 20)	(Football Federation Islamic Republic of Iran) Paykan Tehran
13	DF	Sheys Rezaei	21 March 1984 (aged 22)	(Football Federation Islamic Republic of Iran) Persepolis Tehran
14	DF	Saeid Chahjouei	22 June 1986 (aged 20)	(Football Federation Islamic Republic of Iran) Esteghlal Ahvaz
15	DF	Hossein Mahini	16 September 1986 (aged 20)	(Football Federation Islamic Republic of Iran) Esteghlal Ahvaz
16	MF	Mohammad Nouri	9 January 1983 (aged 23)	(Football Federation Islamic Republic of Iran) Sepahan Isfahan
17	DF	Khosro Heidari	14 September 1983 (aged 23)	(Football Federation Islamic Republic of Iran) PAS Tehran
18	FW	Ehsan Khorsandi	24 March 1985 (aged 21)	(Football Federation Islamic Republic of Iran) Persepolis Tehran
19	FW	Adel Kolahkaj	21 February 1985 (aged 21)	(Football Federation Islamic Republic of Iran) Foolad Khuzestan
20	DF	Mehrdad Pouladi	26 February 1987 (aged 19)	(Football Federation Islamic Republic of Iran) Paykan Tehran
21	GK	Hassan Roudbarian	6 July 1978 (aged 28)	(Football Federation Islamic Republic of Iran) PAS Tehran

== Iraq ==
Coach: Yahya Alwan

No.	Pos.	Player	Date of birth (age)	Club
1	GK	Mohammed Noor Al-Deen	6 August 1984 (aged 22)	(Iraq Football Association) Al-Quwa Al-Jawiya
2	DF	Mohammed Ali Karim	25 June 1986 (aged 20)	(Iraq Football Association) Al-Shorta
6	DF	Haidar Raheem	22 April 1985 (aged 21)	(Iraq Football Association) Al-Quwa Al-Jawiya
7	FW	Mustafa Karim	21 July 1987 (aged 19)	(Iraq Football Association) Erbil
8	MF	Samer Saeed	27 May 1984 (aged 22)	(Iraq Football Association) Al-Quwa Al-Jawiya
9	FW	Ali Mansour	27 September 1985 (aged 21)	(Iraq Football Association) Al-Quwa Al-Jawiya
10	FW	Younis Mahmoud	3 February 1983 (aged 23)	(Qatar Football Association) Al-Gharafa
12	DF	Jassim Mohammed	3 May 1984 (aged 22)	(Iraq Football Association) Duhok
13	MF	Haidar Sabah	15 March 1986 (aged 20)	(Iraq Football Association) Al-Zawraa
15	DF	Ali Rehema	8 August 1985 (aged 21)	(Iraq Football Association) Al-Quwa Al-Jawiya
16	MF	Ali Khudhair	21 April 1986 (aged 20)	(Iraq Football Association) Al-Quwa Al-Jawiya
17	MF	Alaa Abdul-Zahra	22 December 1987 (aged 18)	(Football Federation Islamic Republic of Iran) Sanat Mes Kerman
18	FW	Karrar Jassim	11 June 1987 (aged 19)	(Iraq Football Association) Al-Najaf
19	MF	Salam Shaker	31 July 1986 (aged 20)	(Iraq Football Association) Al-Talaba
21	DF	Haidar Aboodi	26 March 1986 (aged 20)	(Iraq Football Association) Al-Najaf
22	GK	Sarhang Muhsin	1 January 1986 (aged 20)	(Iraq Football Association) Erbil
24	GK	Mohammed Gassid	10 December 1986 (aged 19)	(Iraq Football Association) Al-Shorta
25	MF	Ahmed Abid Ali	18 January 1986 (aged 20)	(Iraq Football Association) Al-Zawraa
30	DF	Muayad Khalid	1 September 1985 (aged 21)	(Iraq Football Association) Al-Quwa Al-Jawiya
31	MF	Osama Ali	25 June 1988 (aged 18)	(Iraq Football Association) Al-Talaba
32	GK	Ahmed Jabbar	26 April 1984 (aged 22)	(Iraq Football Association) Al-Talaba

== Japan ==
Coach: Yasuharu Sorimachi

No.	Pos.	Player	Date of birth (age)	Club
1	GK	Kenya Matsui	10 September 1985 (aged 21)	(Japan Football Association) Júbilo Iwata
2	DF	Yugo Ichiyanagi	2 April 1985 (aged 21)	(Japan Football Association) Tokyo Verdy 1969
3	DF	Hajime Hosogai	10 June 1986 (aged 20)	(Japan Football Association) Urawa Red Diamonds
4	DF	Hiroki Mizumoto	12 September 1985 (aged 21)	(Japan Football Association) JEF United Chiba
5	DF	Terukazu Tanaka	14 July 1985 (aged 21)	(Japan Football Association) Omiya Ardija
6	DF	Naoaki Aoyama	18 July 1986 (aged 20)	(Japan Football Association) Shimizu S-Pulse
7	MF	Takuya Honda	17 April 1985 (aged 21)	(Japan Football Association) Hosei University
8	MF	Keisuke Honda	13 June 1986 (aged 20)	(Japan Football Association) Nagoya Grampus Eight
9	FW	Robert Cullen	7 June 1985 (aged 21)	(Japan Football Association) Júbilo Iwata
10	MF	Chikashi Masuda	19 June 1985 (aged 21)	(Japan Football Association) Kashima Antlers
11	FW	Sota Hirayama	6 June 1985 (aged 21)	(Japan Football Association) FC Tokyo
12	MF	Yojiro Takahagi	2 August 1986 (aged 20)	(Japan Football Association) Ehime
13	MF	Shuto Yamamoto	1 June 1985 (aged 21)	(Japan Football Association) Waseda University
14	MF	Akihiro Ienaga	13 June 1986 (aged 20)	(Japan Football Association) Gamba Osaka
15	MF	Toshihiro Aoyama	22 February 1986 (aged 20)	(Japan Football Association) Sanfrecce Hiroshima
16	MF	Hiroyuki Taniguchi	27 June 1985 (aged 21)	(Japan Football Association) Kawasaki Frontale
17	FW	Hiroki Bandai	19 February 1986 (aged 20)	(Japan Football Association) Vegalta Sendai
18	GK	Akihiro Sato	30 August 1986 (aged 20)	(Japan Football Association) Sanfrecce Hiroshima
19	FW	Shunsuke Maeda	9 June 1986 (aged 20)	(Japan Football Association) Sanfrecce Hiroshima
20	FW	Shinji Tsujio	23 December 1985 (aged 20)	(Japan Football Association) Chuo University

== Jordan ==
Coach: Nihad Al-Souqar

No.	Pos.	Player	Date of birth (age)	Club
1	GK	Salah Massad	9 August 1989 (aged 17)	(Jordan Football Association) Al-Yarmouk
2	DF	Abdullah Al-Bashir	21 November 1986 (aged 20)	(Jordan Football Association) Shabab Al-Ordon
3	DF	Mouneef Ababneh	23 April 1985 (aged 21)	(Jordan Football Association) Al-Hussein
4	DF	Ahmad Odeh	19 January 1985 (aged 21)	(Jordan Football Association) Shabab Al-Ordon
5	DF	Ammar Abu-Aleeqa	13 March 1985 (aged 21)	(Jordan Football Association) Al-Arabi
6	MF	Essam Mubaideen	15 June 1986 (aged 20)	(Jordan Football Association) Al-Faisaly
7	MF	Mohammad Khair	6 April 1986 (aged 20)	(Jordan Football Association) Shabab Al-Hussein
8	FW	Odai Al-Saify	26 May 1986 (aged 20)	(Jordan Football Association) Shabab Al-Ordon
9	FW	Musa Hammad	20 January 1985 (aged 21)	(Jordan Football Association) Al-Wehdat
10	MF	Issa Al-Sabah	25 December 1986 (aged 19)	(Jordan Football Association) Al-Wehdat
11	MF	Mohannad Al-Maharmeh	30 December 1986 (aged 19)	(Jordan Football Association) Shabab Al-Ordon
12	GK	Mohammad Shatnawi	17 August 1985 (aged 21)	(Jordan Football Association) Al-Hussein
13	DF	Mohammad Al-Maharmeh	23 March 1986 (aged 20)	(Jordan Football Association) Sahab
14	MF	Yousef Al-Shboul	4 July 1985 (aged 21)	(Jordan Football Association) Al-Arabi
15	DF	Mohammad Al-Khatib	13 February 1986 (aged 20)	(Jordan Football Association) Al-Baqa'a
16	MF	Ahmad Abdel-Halim	4 September 1986 (aged 20)	(Jordan Football Association) Al-Wehdat
17	DF	Mohammad Makawi	20 March 1985 (aged 21)	(Jordan Football Association) Shabab Al-Hussein
19	FW	Mohammad Al-Zoubi	1 March 1985 (aged 21)	(Jordan Football Association) Al-Ramtha
20	MF	Amer Wrikat	14 February 1986 (aged 20)	(Jordan Football Association) Al-Baqa'a
22	GK	Anas Tareef	18 March 1986 (aged 20)	(Jordan Football Association) Al-Ahli

== Kuwait ==
Coach: (Serbia) Vladimir Petrović

No.	Pos.	Player	Date of birth (age)	Club
1	GK	Khaled Al-Rashidi	20 April 1987 (aged 19)	(Kuwait Football Association) Al-Tadhamon
2	DF	Bader Al-Taher	15 October 1988 (aged 18)	(Kuwait Football Association) Al-Yarmouk
3	DF	Fahad Awadh	26 February 1985 (aged 21)	(Kuwait Football Association) Al-Kuwait
4	MF	Adel Humoud	20 June 1986 (aged 20)	(Kuwait Football Association) Al-Jahra
5	DF	Mohammad Rashed	1 July 1987 (aged 19)	(Kuwait Football Association) Al-Qadsia
6	MF	Ebrahim Shehab	20 January 1986 (aged 20)	(Kuwait Football Association) Al-Kuwait
7	FW	Hamad Al-Enezi	5 October 1986 (aged 20)	(Kuwait Football Association) Al-Qadsia
8	MF	Talal Nayef	10 November 1985 (aged 21)	(Kuwait Football Association) Al-Nasr
9	FW	Marzouq Zaki	27 December 1987 (aged 18)	(Kuwait Football Association) Al-Sahel
10	MF	Majed Al-Enezi	26 July 1986 (aged 20)	(Kuwait Football Association) Al-Yarmouk
11	MF	Hussain Al-Musawi	11 July 1988 (aged 18)	(Kuwait Football Association) Al-Arabi
13	GK	Hameed Al-Qallaf	10 August 1987 (aged 19)	(Kuwait Football Association) Al-Yarmouk
14	FW	Abdullah Al-Mutawa	24 January 1985 (aged 21)	(Kuwait Football Association) Al-Arabi
15	MF	Abdullah Al-Dhafeeri	29 April 1986 (aged 20)	(Kuwait Football Association) Al-Qadsia
17	FW	Bader Al-Mutawa	10 January 1985 (aged 21)	(Kuwait Football Association) Al-Qadsia
18	DF	Amer Al-Fadhel	21 April 1988 (aged 18)	(Kuwait Football Association) Al-Qadsia
19	DF	Abdullah Msheleh	19 July 1985 (aged 21)	(Kuwait Football Association) Al-Tadhamon
20	MF	Talal Al-Amer	22 February 1987 (aged 19)	(Kuwait Football Association) Al-Qadsia
25	DF	Hussain Al-Ghareeb	27 June 1985 (aged 21)	(Kuwait Football Association) Al-Arabi
28	DF	Abdulrahman Al-Zahamil	1 January 1986 (aged 20)	(Kuwait Football Association) Al-Qadsia

== Kyrgyzstan ==
Coach: Boris Podkorytov

No.	Pos.	Player	Date of birth (age)	Club
1	GK	Pavel Matyash	11 July 1987 (aged 19)	(Kyrgyz Football Union) Dordoi-Dynamo Naryn
2	DF	Radik Vodopyanov	20 August 1984 (aged 22)	(Kyrgyz Football Union) Sher-Ak-Dan Bishkek
3	DF	Farukh Abitov	4 December 1988 (aged 17)	(Kyrgyz Football Union) Dordoi-Dynamo Naryn
4	DF	Stepan Miagkih	5 February 1987 (aged 19)	(Kyrgyz Football Union) Muras-Sport Bishkek
5	DF	Igor Kudrenko	13 November 1978 (aged 28)	(Kyrgyz Football Union) Dordoi-Dynamo Naryn
6	DF	Davron Askarov	6 January 1988 (aged 18)	(Kyrgyz Football Union) Zhashtyk-Ak-Altyn Kara-Suu
7	DF	Timur Valiev	27 July 1984 (aged 22)	(Kyrgyz Football Union) Abdish-Ata-FShM Kant
8	MF	Sardorbek Askarov	17 February 1987 (aged 19)	(Kyrgyz Football Union) Muras-Sport Bishkek
9	DF	Ruslan Sydykov	4 January 1975 (aged 31)	(Kyrgyz Football Union) Dordoi-Dynamo Naryn
10	FW	Vladimir Verevkin	8 May 1987 (aged 19)	(Kyrgyz Football Union) Muras-Sport Bishkek
11	MF	Ildar Amirov	9 October 1987 (aged 19)	(Kyrgyz Football Union) Dordoi-Dynamo Naryn
12	MF	Artem Muladjanov	4 February 1988 (aged 18)	(Kyrgyz Football Union) Muras-Sport Bishkek
13	DF	Timur Kydyraliev	2 May 1983 (aged 23)	(Kyrgyz Football Union) Dordoi-Dynamo Naryn
14	FW	Azamat Ishenbayev	19 June 1978 (aged 28)	(Kyrgyz Football Union) Dordoi-Dynamo Naryn
15	FW	Almazbek Mirzaliev	10 June 1987 (aged 19)	(Kyrgyz Football Union) Alay Osh
16	GK	Valery Kashuba	14 September 1984 (aged 22)	(Kyrgyz Football Union) Dordoi-Dynamo Naryn
17	MF	Evgeniy Malinin	8 September 1986 (aged 20)	(Kazakhstan Football Federation) Astana
18	MF	Vadim Kharchenko	28 May 1984 (aged 22)	(Kyrgyz Football Union) Dordoi-Dynamo Naryn
19	MF	Roman Ablakimov	28 August 1987 (aged 19)	(Kyrgyz Football Union) Muras-Sport Bishkek
20	FW	Sergey Chikishev	29 July 1984 (aged 22)	(Kyrgyz Football Union) Dordoi-Dynamo Naryn

== Macau ==
Coach: (Japan) Masanaga Kageyama

No.	Pos.	Player	Date of birth (age)	Club
1	GK	Tai Chou Tek	20 August 1987 (aged 19)	(Macau Football Association) MFA Development
4	DF	Sou Fai Wong	19 October 1983 (aged 23)	(Macau Football Association) Lam Pak
5	DF	Leong Ka Hou	27 May 1988 (aged 18)	(Macau Football Association) MFA Development
6	DF	Lao Pak Kin	24 May 1984 (aged 22)	(Macau Football Association) Lam Pak
7	MF	Leung Chon In	8 July 1987 (aged 19)	(Macau Football Association) MFA Development
8	MF	Cheang Cheng Ieong	18 August 1984 (aged 22)	(Macau Football Association) Monte Carlo
9	FW	Chong In Leong	25 May 1980 (aged 26)	(Macau Football Association) Serviços de Alfândega
10	DF	Geofredo Cheung	18 May 1979 (aged 27)	(Macau Football Association) Monte Carlo
11	MF	Ian Chi Pang	26 December 1983 (aged 22)	(Macau Football Association) Lam Pak
13	MF	Chan Pak Chun	5 December 1985 (aged 20)	(Macau Football Association) Monte Carlo
14	MF	Luis Manuel Amorim	6 May 1986 (aged 20)	(Macau Football Association) MFA Development
15	FW	Mok Kin Fong	6 March 1980 (aged 26)	(Macau Football Association) Lam Pak
16	FW	Lei Fu Weng	23 October 1986 (aged 20)	(Macau Football Association) Vong Chiu
17	DF	Mok Tsz Yeung	7 January 1988 (aged 18)	(Macau Football Association) MFA Development
18	FW	Iek Kim Pang	9 April 1987 (aged 19)	(Macau Football Association) Vong Chiu
19	FW	Chan Kin Seng	19 March 1985 (aged 21)	(Macau Football Association) Monte Carlo
21	DF	Kong Cheng Hou	2 August 1986 (aged 20)	(Macau Football Association) Monte Carlo
22	GK	Tam Heng Wa	25 December 1986 (aged 19)	(Macau Football Association) Vong Chiu
26	DF	Un Tak Ian	9 November 1986 (aged 20)	(Macau Football Association) MFA Development
29	MF	Lei Kam Hong	4 May 1988 (aged 18)	(Macau Football Association) MFA Development

== Malaysia ==
Coach: Norizan Bakar

No.	Pos.	Player	Date of birth (age)	Club
1	GK	Syed Adney	29 November 1986 (aged 20)	(Football Association of Malaysia) Selangor
3	DF	Es Lizuan Zahid Amir	5 November 1983 (aged 23)	(Football Association of Malaysia) TMFC
4	DF	Ronny Harun	19 January 1984 (aged 22)	(Football Association of Malaysia) Sabah
5	DF	Norhafiz Zamani Misbah	15 July 1981 (aged 25)	(Football Association of Malaysia) Pahang
6	DF	Thirumurugan Veeran	9 January 1983 (aged 23)	(Football Association of Malaysia) Kedah
7	FW	Mohd Fadzli Saari	1 January 1983 (aged 23)	(Football Association of Malaysia) Selangor
8	MF	Safiq Rahim	5 July 1987 (aged 19)	(Football Association of Malaysia) Selangor
9	FW	Mohd Saufi Ibrahim	27 January 1983 (aged 23)	(Football Association of Malaysia) Penang
10	MF	Hardi Jaafar	30 May 1979 (aged 27)	(Football Association of Malaysia) TMFC
11	MF	Nor Farhan Muhammad	19 December 1984 (aged 21)	(Football Association of Malaysia) Terengganu
13	FW	Samransak Kram	10 November 1985 (aged 21)	(Football Association of Malaysia) Kedah
14	MF	Mohd Norizam Salaman	6 March 1984 (aged 22)	(Football Association of Malaysia) Johor
15	MF	Khyril Muhymeen	9 May 1987 (aged 19)	(Football Association of Malaysia) Kedah
16	DF	Ahmad Azlan Zainal	16 April 1986 (aged 20)	(Football Association of Malaysia) Perak
18	DF	Kaironnisam Sahabudin Hussain	10 May 1979 (aged 27)	(Football Association of Malaysia) UPB-MyTeam
20	FW	Norshahrul Idlan	8 June 1986 (aged 20)	(Football Association of Malaysia) Perak
21	GK	Iqbal Suhaimi	10 September 1984 (aged 22)	(Football Association of Malaysia) Pahang
23	FW	Azlan Ismail	3 October 1984 (aged 22)	(Football Association of Malaysia) Perlis
24	DF	S. Subramaniam	31 August 1985 (aged 21)	(Football Association of Malaysia) Perak
25	MF	Azi Shahril Azmi	20 September 1985 (aged 21)	(Football Association of Malaysia) Perlis

== Maldives ==
Coach: (Bulgaria) Yordan Stoykov

No.	Pos.	Player	Date of birth (age)	Club
1	GK	Ibrahim Ifrah Areef	8 June 1986 (aged 20)	(Football Association of Maldives) Valencia
2	DF	Abdulla Haneef	2 October 1984 (aged 22)	(Football Association of Maldives) Hurriyya
3	MF	Mohamed Sifan	8 March 1983 (aged 23)	(Football Association of Maldives) New Radiant
4	DF	Mohamed Umair	3 July 1988 (aged 18)	(Football Association of Maldives) Victory
5	FW	Ibrahim Fazeel	9 October 1980 (aged 26)	(Football Association of Maldives) New Radiant
6	MF	Mohamed Arif	11 August 1985 (aged 21)	(Football Association of Maldives) IFC
7	FW	Ali Ashfaq	6 September 1985 (aged 21)	(Football Association of Maldives) New Radiant
8	DF	Faruhad Ismail	16 September 1985 (aged 21)	(Football Association of Maldives) Valencia
9	FW	Ashad Ali	14 September 1985 (aged 21)	(Football Association of Maldives) Victory
10	FW	Shinaz Hilmy	11 January 1984 (aged 22)	(Football Association of Maldives) Hurriyya
11	DF	Akram Abdul Ghanee	19 March 1987 (aged 19)	(Football Association of Maldives) Valencia
12	DF	Adam Mauroof	23 August 1985 (aged 21)	(Football Association of Maldives) Valencia
13	MF	Assad Abdul Ghanee	2 January 1976 (aged 30)	(Football Association of Maldives) Valencia
14	FW	Hussain Simaz	10 November 1983 (aged 23)	(Football Association of Maldives) New Radiant
16	MF	Abdul Muhaimin Mohamed	5 June 1985 (aged 21)	(Football Association of Maldives) Victory
17	MF	Izzath Abdul Baaree	14 December 1983 (aged 22)	(Football Association of Maldives) Mahibadhoo
18	GK	Imran Mohamed	18 December 1980 (aged 25)	(Football Association of Maldives) Victory
19	FW	Adam Niyaz	1 December 1985 (aged 21)	(Football Association of Maldives) IFC
20	DF	Ahmed Ashfan	18 June 1984 (aged 22)	(Football Association of Maldives) Victory
21	MF	Mohamed Riyaz	10 October 1985 (aged 21)	(Football Association of Maldives) Hurriyya

== North Korea ==
Coach: Ri Jong-man

No.	Pos.	Player	Date of birth (age)	Club
1	GK	Ri Myong-dok	2 February 1984 (aged 22)	(DPR Korea Football Association) Pyongyang
2	DF	Cha Jong-hyok	25 September 1985 (aged 21)	(DPR Korea Football Association) Amnokgang
3	DF	Ri Jun-il	24 August 1987 (aged 19)	(DPR Korea Football Association) Sobaeksu
5	MF	Mun In-guk	29 September 1978 (aged 28)	(DPR Korea Football Association) April 25
6	MF	An Jong-ho	11 March 1987 (aged 19)	(DPR Korea Football Association) Amnokgang
7	DF	Kim Chol-ho	15 October 1985 (aged 21)	(DPR Korea Football Association) Pyongyang
8	MF	Ri Myong-gwang	5 August 1985 (aged 21)	(DPR Korea Football Association) Pyongyang
9	MF	Pak Nam-chol	2 July 1985 (aged 21)	(DPR Korea Football Association) April 25
10	MF	Hong Yong-jo	22 May 1982 (aged 24)	(DPR Korea Football Association) April 25
12	FW	Kim Myong-won	15 July 1983 (aged 23)	(DPR Korea Football Association) Amnokgang
13	MF	Ri Chol-myong	18 February 1988 (aged 18)	(DPR Korea Football Association) Pyongyang
15	MF	Kim Yong-jun	19 July 1983 (aged 23)	(DPR Korea Football Association) Pyongyang
16	DF	So Hyok-chol	19 February 1982 (aged 24)	(DPR Korea Football Association) Pyongyang
17	FW	Choe Chol-man	22 September 1985 (aged 21)	(DPR Korea Football Association) April 25
18	MF	Kim Song-chol	29 August 1983 (aged 23)	(DPR Korea Football Association) Kigwancha
19	MF	Jong Su-hyok	30 April 1987 (aged 19)	(DPR Korea Football Association) Pyongyang
20	DF	Pak Chol-jin	5 September 1985 (aged 21)	(DPR Korea Football Association) Amnokgang
21	GK	Ri Myong-guk	9 September 1986 (aged 20)	(DPR Korea Football Association) Pyongyang
22	FW	An Chol-hyok	27 June 1987 (aged 19)	(DPR Korea Football Association) Rimyongsu
23	GK	Kim Myong-gil	16 October 1984 (aged 22)	(DPR Korea Football Association) Amnokgang
25	FW	Jang Phyong-il	10 October 1984 (aged 22)	(DPR Korea Football Association) Amnokgang

== Oman ==
Coach: (Czech Republic) Milan Máčala

No.	Pos.	Player	Date of birth (age)	Club
1	GK	Sulaiman Al-Mazroui	13 September 1972 (aged 34)	(Oman Football Association) Muscat
2	DF	Mohammed Rabia Al-Noobi	10 May 1981 (aged 25)	(Qatar Football Association) Al-Sadd
3	DF	Saud Suwaid	30 March 1987 (aged 19)	(Oman Football Association) Al-Orouba
4	DF	Said Suwailim Al-Shoon	28 August 1983 (aged 23)	(Qatar Football Association) Umm Salal
5	DF	Ali Saleem Al-Farsi	30 July 1985 (aged 21)	(Oman Football Association) Sur
7	MF	Sultan Al-Touqi	2 January 1984 (aged 22)	(Kuwait Football Association) Al-Salmiya
8	MF	Badar Al-Maimani	16 July 1984 (aged 22)	(Qatar Football Association) Al-Ahli
9	FW	Ibrahim Al-Gheilani	23 June 1985 (aged 21)	(Oman Football Association) Al-Orouba
10	MF	Fawzi Bashir	6 May 1984 (aged 22)	(Kuwait Football Association) Al-Qadsia
11	FW	Hassan Zaher Al-Maghni	7 January 1985 (aged 21)	(Oman Football Association) Al-Nasr
12	FW	Ahmed Mubarak Al-Mahaijri	23 February 1985 (aged 21)	(Qatar Football Association) Al-Rayyan
15	FW	Ismail Al-Ajmi	9 June 1984 (aged 22)	(Qatar Football Association) Al-Shamal
16	MF	Mohammed Al-Hinai	19 July 1984 (aged 22)	(Kuwait Football Association) Al-Qadsia
17	DF	Hassan Mudhafar Al-Gheilani	26 June 1980 (aged 26)	(Qatar Football Association) Al-Ahli
18	FW	Hamed Al-Balushi	8 January 1984 (aged 22)	(Oman Football Association) Muscat
20	FW	Amad Al-Hosni	18 July 1984 (aged 22)	(Qatar Football Association) Qatar SC
21	MF	Ahmed Hadid Al-Mukhaini	18 July 1984 (aged 22)	(Qatar Football Association) Al-Shamal
22	DF	Sulaiman Said Al-Shukaili	17 February 1985 (aged 21)	(Oman Football Association) Al-Bahla
25	DF	Khalifa Ayil Al-Noufali	1 March 1984 (aged 22)	(Qatar Football Association) Al-Sadd
26	GK	Harib Al-Habsi	4 December 1986 (aged 19)	(Oman Football Association) Al-Mudhaibi

== Pakistan ==
Coach: (Bahrain) Salman Sharida

No.	Pos.	Player	Date of birth (age)	Club
1	GK	Jaffar Khan	20 March 1981 (aged 25)	(Pakistan Football Federation) Army
2	DF	Naveed Akram	16 May 1984 (aged 22)	(Pakistan Football Federation) WAPDA
3	DF	Muhammad Irfan	5 July 1984 (aged 22)	(Pakistan Football Federation) KRL
4	DF	Tanveer Ahmed	15 April 1976 (aged 30)	(Pakistan Football Federation) WAPDA
5	DF	Samar Ishaq	1 January 1986 (aged 20)	(Pakistan Football Federation) KRL
6	FW	Adeel Ahmed	25 November 1983 (aged 23)	(Pakistan Football Federation) KRL
7	MF	Zahid Hameed	1 August 1985 (aged 21)	(Pakistan Football Federation) WAPDA
8	MF	Mubashar Hussain	20 November 1986 (aged 20)	(Pakistan Football Federation) Army
9	FW	Shahid Ahmed	1 March 1983 (aged 23)	(Pakistan Football Federation) KRL
10	FW	Muhammad Essa	20 November 1983 (aged 23)	(Pakistan Football Federation) KRL
11	MF	Abdul Aziz	11 January 1986 (aged 20)	(Pakistan Football Federation) NBP
12	FW	Shakir Lashari	24 March 1984 (aged 22)	(Pakistan Football Federation) KESC
14	DF	Muhammad Imran	15 November 1986 (aged 20)	(Pakistan Football Federation) Army
15	MF	Muhammad Waseem	20 August 1987 (aged 19)	(Pakistan Football Federation) KRL
16	DF	Abbas Ali	3 September 1990 (aged 16)	(Pakistan Football Federation) NBP
17	DF	Ejaz Ahmed	17 December 1984 (aged 21)	(Pakistan Football Federation) Army
18	GK	Muhammad Shahzad	25 August 1983 (aged 23)	(Pakistan Football Federation) Navy
19	MF	Imran Niazi	17 November 1985 (aged 21)	(Pakistan Football Federation) WAPDA
21	FW	Muhammad Rasool	23 May 1985 (aged 21)	(Pakistan Football Federation) KRL
24	FW	Adnan Bari	19 July 1986 (aged 20)	(Pakistan Football Federation) Army

== Palestine ==
Coach: Ghassan Al-Balawi

No.	Pos.	Player	Date of birth (age)	Club
1	GK	Mohammed Shbair	6 December 1986 (aged 19)	(Palestinian Football Association) Ittihad Khan Yunis
2	DF	Ammar Abu-Seleisel	10 March 1984 (aged 22)	(Palestinian Football Association) Al-Hilal Gaza
3	DF	Abdelatif Bahdari	20 February 1984 (aged 22)	(Palestinian Football Association) Khidmat Rafah
4	DF	Abdullah Hasan	7 December 1986 (aged 19)	(Palestinian Football Association) Shabab Rafah
5	DF	Ihmeidan Barbakh	1 January 1978 (aged 28)	(Palestinian Football Association) Ittihad Khan Yunis
6	DF	Majed Abu-Sidu	1 November 1985 (aged 21)	(Kuwait Football Association) Al-Salmiya
7	DF	Raed Fares	6 December 1982 (aged 23)	(Palestinian Football Association) Ittihad Khan Yunis
8	FW	Said Al-Sobakhi	20 June 1985 (aged 21)	(Palestinian Football Association) Khidmat Rafah
9	MF	Hazim Al-Wazeer	21 April 1984 (aged 22)	(Palestinian Football Association) Al-Hilal Gaza
10	MF	Suleiman Obeid	28 October 1981 (aged 25)	(Palestinian Football Association) Khidmat Al-Shatia
11	MF	Ayman Al-Hindi	5 January 1986 (aged 20)	(Palestinian Football Association) Gaza SC
12	GK	Ramy Al-Bayouk	27 March 1984 (aged 22)	(Palestinian Football Association) Ittihad Khan Yunis
13	DF	Anan Abu-Turiya	13 July 1985 (aged 21)	(Palestinian Football Association) Shabab Al-Khalil
15	FW	Ahmed Keshkesh	15 September 1984 (aged 22)	(Palestinian Football Association) Al-Hilal Gaza
17	FW	Houssam Wadi	25 August 1986 (aged 20)	(Palestinian Football Association) Ittihad Al-Shejaiya
18	MF	Mousa Abu-Jazar	25 August 1987 (aged 19)	(Palestinian Football Association) Shabab Rafah
19	DF	Ahmed Abu-Thaher	23 January 1983 (aged 23)	(Palestinian Football Association) Hilal Al-Makdesi
20	FW	Fahed Attal	1 January 1985 (aged 21)	(Jordan Football Association) Al-Jazeera
21	MF	Nashat Al-Batsh	12 May 1986 (aged 20)	(Palestinian Football Association) Tuffah SC
31	GK	Mohammed Abu-Aid	21 June 1986 (aged 20)	(Palestinian Football Association) Shabab Areeha

== Qatar ==
Coach: (Bosnia and Herzegovina) Džemaludin Mušović

No.	Pos.	Player	Date of birth (age)	Club
1	GK	Mohamed Saqr	17 May 1981 (aged 25)	(Qatar Football Association) Al-Sadd
3	DF	Abdulrahman Mesbeh	7 January 1984 (aged 22)	(Qatar Football Association) Al-Rayyan
4	MF	Abdulla Al-Berik	14 February 1984 (aged 22)	(Qatar Football Association) Al-Sadd
5	MF	Majdi Siddiq	3 September 1985 (aged 21)	(Qatar Football Association) Al-Khor
7	DF	Ali Nasser	16 May 1986 (aged 20)	(Qatar Football Association) Al-Sadd
8	MF	Mesaad Al-Hamad	11 February 1986 (aged 20)	(Qatar Football Association) Al-Sadd
10	FW	Hussein Yasser	9 January 1984 (aged 22)	(Qatar Football Association) Al-Rayyan
12	FW	Magid Mohamed	1 October 1985 (aged 21)	(Qatar Football Association) Al-Sadd
14	DF	Ibrahim Al-Ghanim	27 June 1983 (aged 23)	(Qatar Football Association) Al-Arabi
15	MF	Talal Al-Bloushi	22 May 1986 (aged 20)	(Qatar Football Association) Al-Sadd
16	FW	Adel Lami	13 November 1985 (aged 21)	(Qatar Football Association) Al-Rayyan
17	MF	Wesam Rizik	5 February 1981 (aged 25)	(Qatar Football Association) Al-Sadd
18	FW	Waleed Jassem	2 August 1986 (aged 20)	(Qatar Football Association) Al-Rayyan
19	FW	Yusef Ahmed	14 October 1988 (aged 18)	(Qatar Football Association) Al-Sadd
21	DF	Abdulla Koni	19 July 1979 (aged 27)	(Qatar Football Association) Al-Sadd
22	GK	Qasem Burhan	15 December 1985 (aged 20)	(Qatar Football Association) Al-Rayyan
23	FW	Sebastián Soria	8 November 1983 (aged 23)	(Qatar Football Association) Qatar SC
26	FW	Khalfan Ibrahim	18 February 1988 (aged 18)	(Qatar Football Association) Al-Sadd
27	MF	Younes Ali	3 January 1983 (aged 23)	(Qatar Football Association) Al-Ahli
30	DF	Bilal Mohammed	2 January 1986 (aged 20)	(Qatar Football Association) Al-Gharafa

== Singapore ==
Coach: (Serbia) Radojko Avramović

No.	Pos.	Player	Date of birth (age)	Club
1	GK	Hassan Sunny	2 April 1984 (aged 22)	(Football Association of Singapore) Geylang United
2	DF	Ismail Yunos	24 October 1986 (aged 20)	(Football Association of Singapore) Young Lions
6	MF	Isa Halim	15 May 1986 (aged 20)	(Football Association of Singapore) Young Lions
7	MF	Shi Jiayi	2 September 1983 (aged 23)	(Football Association of Singapore) Young Lions
8	MF	Ridhuan Muhammad	6 May 1984 (aged 22)	(Football Association of Singapore) Young Lions
9	FW	Ashrin Shariff	10 October 1982 (aged 24)	(Football Association of Singapore) SAFFC
10	FW	Fazrul Nawaz	17 April 1985 (aged 21)	(Football Association of Singapore) Young Lions
11	DF	Baihakki Khaizan	31 January 1984 (aged 22)	(Football Association of Singapore) Young Lions
12	FW	Khairul Amri	14 March 1985 (aged 21)	(Football Association of Singapore) Young Lions
13	MF	Kamal Nasir Haja	2 February 1983 (aged 23)	(Football Association of Singapore) Home United
14	DF	Hafiz Osman	15 February 1984 (aged 22)	(Football Association of Singapore) SAFFC
15	MF	Tengku Mushadad	7 August 1984 (aged 22)	(Football Association of Singapore) Young Lions
16	DF	Daniel Bennett	7 January 1978 (aged 28)	(Football Association of Singapore) Woodlands Wellington
17	FW	Shahril Ishak	23 January 1984 (aged 22)	(Football Association of Singapore) Young Lions
18	GK	Lionel Lewis	16 December 1982 (aged 23)	(Football Association of Singapore) Home United
19	DF	Jeremy Chiang	11 April 1985 (aged 21)	(Football Association of Singapore) Young Lions
20	DF	Precious Emuejeraye	21 March 1983 (aged 23)	(Football Association of Singapore) Gombak United
21	MF	Itimi Dickson	14 November 1983 (aged 23)	(Football Association of Singapore) Woodlands Wellington
22	DF	Shaiful Esah	12 May 1986 (aged 20)	(Football Association of Singapore) SAFFC
25	MF	Hariss Harun	19 November 1990 (aged 16)	(Football Association of Singapore) National Football Academy

== South Korea ==
Coach: (Netherlands) Pim Verbeek

No.	Pos.	Player	Date of birth (age)	Club
1	GK	Kim Young-kwang	28 June 1983 (aged 23)	(Korea Football Association) Jeonnam Dragons
2	MF	Cho Won-hee	17 April 1983 (aged 23)	(Korea Football Association) Suwon Samsung Bluewings
3	DF	Kim Jin-kyu	16 February 1985 (aged 21)	(Japan Football Association) Júbilo Iwata
4	DF	Kim Dong-jin	29 January 1982 (aged 24)	(Russian Football Union) Zenit Saint Petersburg
5	DF	Kim Chi-woo	11 November 1983 (aged 23)	(Korea Football Association) Incheon United
6	MF	Lee Ho	22 October 1984 (aged 22)	(Russian Football Union) Zenit Saint Petersburg
7	MF	Baek Ji-hoon	28 February 1985 (aged 21)	(Korea Football Association) Suwon Samsung Bluewings
8	MF	Kim Do-heon	14 July 1982 (aged 24)	(Korea Football Association) Seongnam Ilhwa Chunma
9	FW	Jung Jo-gook	23 April 1984 (aged 22)	(Korea Football Association) FC Seoul
10	FW	Lee Chun-soo	9 July 1981 (aged 25)	(Korea Football Association) Ulsan Hyundai Horangi
11	FW	Choi Sung-kuk	8 February 1983 (aged 23)	(Korea Football Association) Ulsan Hyundai Horangi
12	DF	Kim Chi-gon	29 July 1983 (aged 23)	(Korea Football Association) FC Seoul
13	DF	Jung In-whan	15 December 1986 (aged 19)	(Korea Football Association) Jeonbuk Hyundai Motors
14	DF	Lee Jong-min	1 September 1983 (aged 23)	(Korea Football Association) Ulsan Hyundai Horangi
15	MF	Oh Beom-seok	29 July 1984 (aged 22)	(Korea Football Association) Pohang Steelers
16	MF	Oh Jang-eun	24 July 1985 (aged 21)	(Korea Football Association) Daegu
17	FW	Kim Dong-hyun	20 May 1984 (aged 22)	(Russian Football Union) Rubin Kazan
18	FW	Park Chu-young	10 July 1985 (aged 21)	(Korea Football Association) FC Seoul
19	FW	Yeom Ki-hun	30 March 1983 (aged 23)	(Korea Football Association) Jeonbuk Hyundai Motors
20	GK	Jung Sung-ryong	4 January 1985 (aged 21)	(Korea Football Association) Pohang Steelers

== Syria ==
Coach: Fajr Ibrahim

No.	Pos.	Player	Date of birth (age)	Club
1	GK	Mosab Balhous	5 October 1983 (aged 23)	(Syrian Football Association) Al-Karamah
4	DF	Mohammad Istanbuli	21 March 1983 (aged 23)	(Syrian Football Association) Al-Wahda
5	DF	Adib Barakat	6 June 1982 (aged 24)	(Syrian Football Association) Tishreen
6	MF	Jehad Al-Hussain	30 July 1982 (aged 24)	(Syrian Football Association) Al-Karamah
8	MF	Mahmoud Amnah	15 January 1983 (aged 23)	(Syrian Football Association) Al-Ittihad
9	MF	Maher Al-Sayed	13 March 1979 (aged 27)	(Syrian Football Association) Al-Wahda
10	FW	Firas Al-Khatib	9 June 1983 (aged 23)	(Kuwait Football Association) Al-Arabi
11	FW	Mohammad Al-Hamwi	1 January 1986 (aged 20)	(Syrian Football Association) Al-Karamah
13	DF	Aatef Jenyat	8 May 1986 (aged 20)	(Syrian Football Association) Al-Karamah
17	DF	Abdulkader Dakka	10 January 1985 (aged 21)	(Syrian Football Association) Tishreen
18	MF	Abdelrazaq Al-Hussain	15 September 1985 (aged 21)	(Syrian Football Association) Al-Jaish
21	MF	Mouatasem Alaya	1 January 1983 (aged 23)	(Syrian Football Association) Al-Wahda
22	GK	Adnan Al-Hafez	23 April 1984 (aged 22)	(Syrian Football Association) Al-Karamah
24	FW	Raja Rafe	1 May 1983 (aged 23)	(Syrian Football Association) Al-Majd
31	DF	Omar Hemidi	1 May 1986 (aged 20)	(Syrian Football Association) Al-Ittihad
32	DF	Salah Shahrour	2 January 1988 (aged 18)	(Syrian Football Association) Al-Ittihad
34	MF	Wael Ayan	13 June 1985 (aged 21)	(Syrian Football Association) Al-Ittihad
37	FW	Abdulfattah Al-Agha	1 August 1984 (aged 22)	(Syrian Football Association) Al-Ittihad
38	DF	Bakri Tarab	20 January 1985 (aged 21)	(Syrian Football Association) Al-Ittihad

== Tajikistan ==
Coach: Karim Toshpulodov

No.	Pos.	Player	Date of birth (age)	Club
1	GK	Abduaziz Mahkamov	15 July 1987 (aged 19)	(Tajikistan Football Federation) Parvoz Bobojon Ghafurov
3	DF	Naim Nosirov	28 April 1986 (aged 20)	(Tajikistan Football Federation) Regar-TadAZ Tursunzoda
4	DF	Safarali Karimov	17 November 1988 (aged 18)	(Tajikistan Football Federation) Tajik Telecom Qurghonteppa
5	DF	Aleksey Negmatov	4 January 1986 (aged 20)	(Tajikistan Football Federation) Vakhsh Qurghonteppa
6	MF	Akmal Saburov	22 October 1987 (aged 19)	(Tajikistan Football Federation) Vakhsh Qurghonteppa
7	MF	Jamshed Ismailov	12 January 1987 (aged 19)	(Tajikistan Football Federation) Regar-TadAZ Tursunzoda
8	MF	Khurshed Makhmudov	8 August 1982 (aged 24)	(Tajikistan Football Federation) CSKA Dushanbe
9	MF	Ibrahim Rabimov	3 August 1987 (aged 19)	(Tajikistan Football Federation) Regar-TadAZ Tursunzoda
10	FW	Akhtam Khamrakulov	30 January 1988 (aged 18)	(Tajikistan Football Federation) Vakhsh Qurghonteppa
11	FW	Kamil Saidov	25 January 1989 (aged 17)	(Tajikistan Football Federation) Hima Dushanbe
12	MF	Ilkhomjon Ortikov	25 October 1985 (aged 21)	(Tajikistan Football Federation) Vakhsh Qurghonteppa
14	FW	Iskandar Gadoev	9 May 1988 (aged 18)	(Tajikistan Football Federation) CSKA Pamir Dushanbe
16	GK	Alexandr Mukanin	24 August 1978 (aged 28)	(Tajikistan Football Federation) Hima Dushanbe
17	MF	Dilshod Vasiev	12 February 1988 (aged 18)	(Tajikistan Football Federation) Hima Dushanbe
18	FW	Bakhtier Khasanov	9 March 1988 (aged 18)	(Tajikistan Football Federation) Hima Dushanbe
19	DF	Odil Irgashev	10 February 1977 (aged 29)	(Tajikistan Football Federation) Regar-TadAZ Tursunzoda
22	FW	Daler Tukhtasunov	27 August 1986 (aged 20)	(Tajikistan Football Federation) Vakhsh Qurghonteppa

== Thailand ==
Coach: Charnwit Polcheewin

No.	Pos.	Player	Date of birth (age)	Club
1	GK	Narit Taweekul	30 October 1983 (aged 23)	(Football Association of Thailand) BEC Tero Sasana
2	DF	Tada Keelalay	4 January 1984 (aged 22)	(Football Association of Thailand) Bangkok Bank
3	DF	Prat Samakrat	31 October 1985 (aged 21)	(Football Association of Thailand) BEC Tero Sasana
4	DF	Noppol Pitafai	1 February 1985 (aged 21)	(Football Association of Thailand) BEC Tero Sasana
5	DF	Thritthi Nonsrichai	13 March 1983 (aged 23)	(Football Association of Thailand) BEC Tero Sasana
6	DF	Kiatprawut Saiwaeo	24 January 1986 (aged 20)	(Football Association of Thailand) Chonburi
7	MF	Datsakorn Thonglao	30 December 1983 (aged 22)	(Football Association of Thailand) BEC Tero Sasana
8	MF	Kittipol Paphunga	2 November 1983 (aged 23)	(Football Association of Thailand) Chula-Sinthana
9	MF	Suchao Nuchnum	17 May 1983 (aged 23)	(Football Association of Thailand) TOT
10	MF	Tana Chanabut	6 June 1984 (aged 22)	(Football Association of Thailand) Provincial Electricity Authority
11	FW	Kraison Panjaroen	15 June 1986 (aged 20)	(Football Association of Thailand) Bangkok University
12	DF	Natthaphong Samana	29 June 1984 (aged 22)	(Football Association of Thailand) Krung Thai Bank
13	MF	Ekaphan Inthasen	23 September 1983 (aged 23)	(Vietnam Football Federation) Mikado Nam Định
14	FW	Teeratep Winothai	16 February 1985 (aged 21)	(Football Association of Thailand) BEC Tero Sasana
15	FW	Anon Sangsanoi	1 March 1984 (aged 22)	(Football Association of Thailand) BEC Tero Sasana
16	DF	Suree Sukha	27 July 1982 (aged 24)	(Football Association of Thailand) Chonburi
17	FW	Sutee Suksomkit	5 June 1980 (aged 26)	(Football Association of Singapore) Home United
18	GK	Kosin Hathairattanakool	23 March 1982 (aged 24)	(Football Association of Indonesia) Persib Bandung
19	MF	Hatthaporn Suwan	23 February 1984 (aged 22)	(Football Association of Thailand) Tobacco Monopoly
20	DF	Tewarit Junsom	25 February 1984 (aged 22)	(Football Association of Thailand) Tobacco Monopoly

== United Arab Emirates ==
Coach: (France) Alex Dupont

No.	Pos.	Player	Date of birth (age)	Club
1	GK	Yousif Al-Zaabi	15 January 1986 (aged 20)	(United Arab Emirates Football Association) Al-Ittihad
2	DF	Bader Yaqoot	13 December 1985 (aged 20)	(United Arab Emirates Football Association) Al-Ahli
3	DF	Yousif Jaber	25 February 1985 (aged 21)	(United Arab Emirates Football Association) Baniyas
4	DF	Ali Jumaa Al-Zaabi	8 June 1985 (aged 21)	(United Arab Emirates Football Association) Al-Wahda
5	DF	Walid Abbas	11 June 1985 (aged 21)	(United Arab Emirates Football Association) Al-Shabab
6	DF	Adnan Hussain	6 December 1985 (aged 20)	(United Arab Emirates Football Association) Al-Nasr
7	MF	Ali Hussain	21 October 1985 (aged 21)	(United Arab Emirates Football Association) Al-Shabab
8	MF	Nasser Masoud	6 March 1986 (aged 20)	(United Arab Emirates Football Association) Al-Jazira
9	FW	Ahmed Al-Aryani	25 May 1986 (aged 20)	(United Arab Emirates Football Association) Al-Ain
10	MF	Yasser Matar	20 September 1985 (aged 21)	(United Arab Emirates Football Association) Al-Wahda
11	MF	Abdullah Al-Noubi	8 January 1987 (aged 19)	(United Arab Emirates Football Association) Al-Wahda
12	DF	Amer Mubarak	28 December 1987 (aged 18)	(United Arab Emirates Football Association) Al-Nasr
13	DF	Talal Abdulla	23 March 1986 (aged 20)	(United Arab Emirates Football Association) Al-Wahda
14	MF	Adel Saqr	16 March 1986 (aged 20)	(United Arab Emirates Football Association) Al-Ahli
15	FW	Obaid Khalifa	13 April 1985 (aged 21)	(United Arab Emirates Football Association) Al-Ahli
16	FW	Abdulla Qasem	11 August 1986 (aged 20)	(United Arab Emirates Football Association) Al-Jazira
17	GK	Ali Khasif	9 June 1987 (aged 19)	(United Arab Emirates Football Association) Al-Jazira
18	FW	Rashed Al-Hammadi	30 June 1985 (aged 21)	(United Arab Emirates Football Association) Al-Sharjah
19	FW	Ahmed Khamis	16 November 1985 (aged 21)	(United Arab Emirates Football Association) Al-Fujairah
20	MF	Waleed Ahmed	22 January 1986 (aged 20)	(United Arab Emirates Football Association) Al-Ahli

== Uzbekistan ==
Coach: Rauf Inileev

No.	Pos.	Player	Date of birth (age)	Club
1	GK	Aleksandr Lobanov	4 January 1986 (aged 20)	(Uzbekistan Football Association) Sogdiana Jizzakh
2	DF	Anzur Ismailov	21 April 1985 (aged 21)	(Uzbekistan Football Association) Dinamo Samarqand
3	DF	Ilhom Suyunov	17 May 1983 (aged 23)	(Uzbekistan Football Association) Pakhtakor Tashkent
4	DF	Aleksandr Kletskov	27 September 1985 (aged 21)	(Uzbekistan Football Association) Pakhtakor Tashkent
5	DF	Asror Aliqulov	12 September 1978 (aged 28)	(Uzbekistan Football Association) Pakhtakor Tashkent
6	DF	Islom Inomov	30 May 1984 (aged 22)	(Uzbekistan Football Association) Pakhtakor Tashkent
7	MF	Azizbek Haydarov	8 July 1985 (aged 21)	(Uzbekistan Football Association) Lokomotiv Tashkent
8	MF	Server Djeparov	3 October 1982 (aged 24)	(Uzbekistan Football Association) Pakhtakor Tashkent
9	FW	Nosirbek Otakuziev	30 January 1984 (aged 22)	(Uzbekistan Football Association) Neftchi Fergana
10	MF	Nodirbek Kuziboyev	17 February 1985 (aged 21)	(Uzbekistan Football Association) Neftchi Fergana
11	FW	Marat Bikmaev	1 January 1986 (aged 20)	(Russian Football Union) Rubin Kazan
12	GK	Ignatiy Nesterov	20 June 1983 (aged 23)	(Uzbekistan Football Association) Pakhtakor Tashkent
14	DF	Vitaliy Denisov	23 February 1987 (aged 19)	(Russian Football Union) Spartak Nizhny Novgorod
15	FW	Alexander Geynrikh	6 October 1984 (aged 22)	(Russian Football Union) Torpedo Moscow
16	MF	Igor Taran	29 December 1983 (aged 22)	(Uzbekistan Football Association) Shurtan Guzar
17	FW	Kamoliddin Murzoev	17 February 1987 (aged 19)	(Uzbekistan Football Association) Mash'al Mubarek
18	MF	Timur Kapadze	5 September 1981 (aged 25)	(Uzbekistan Football Association) Pakhtakor Tashkent
19	DF	Kamoliddin Tajiev	3 May 1983 (aged 23)	(Uzbekistan Football Association) Sogdiana Jizzakh
20	MF	Ildar Magdeev	11 April 1984 (aged 22)	(Uzbekistan Football Association) Pakhtakor Tashkent
22	MF	Rustam Kadirov	27 July 1983 (aged 23)	(Uzbekistan Football Association) Mash'al Mubarek

== Vietnam ==
Coach: (Austria) Alfred Riedl

No.	Pos.	Player	Date of birth (age)	Club
1	GK	Trần Đức Cường	20 May 1985 (aged 21)	(Vietnam Football Federation) Đà Nẵng
3	DF	Nguyễn Huy Hoàng	4 January 1981 (aged 25)	(Vietnam Football Federation) PJICO Sông Lam Nghệ An
4	DF	Nguyễn Minh Đức	14 September 1983 (aged 23)	(Vietnam Football Federation) PJICO Sông Lam Nghệ An
5	DF	Nguyễn Văn Biển	27 April 1985 (aged 21)	(Vietnam Football Federation) Mikado Nam Định
6	MF	Nguyễn Quý Sửu	18 October 1986 (aged 20)	(Vietnam Football Federation) Đồng Tháp
8	FW	Thạch Bảo Khanh	25 April 1979 (aged 27)	(Vietnam Football Federation) Thể Công Viettel
9	FW	Lê Công Vinh	10 December 1985 (aged 20)	(Vietnam Football Federation) PJICO Sông Lam Nghệ An
11	MF	Lê Hồng Minh	15 September 1978 (aged 28)	(Vietnam Football Federation) Đà Nẵng
14	MF	Lê Tấn Tài	4 January 1984 (aged 22)	(Vietnam Football Federation) Khatoco Khánh Hòa
15	DF	Trương Đình Luật	12 November 1983 (aged 23)	(Vietnam Football Federation) Quân Khu 4
16	DF	Huỳnh Quang Thanh	10 October 1984 (aged 22)	(Vietnam Football Federation) Becamex Bình Dương
17	MF	Nguyễn Vũ Phong	6 February 1985 (aged 21)	(Vietnam Football Federation) Becamex Bình Dương
18	FW	Phan Thanh Bình	1 November 1986 (aged 20)	(Vietnam Football Federation) Đồng Tháp
19	DF	Trần Minh Thiện	25 March 1983 (aged 23)	(Vietnam Football Federation) Hoàng Anh Gia Lai
21	FW	Nguyễn Anh Đức	24 October 1985 (aged 21)	(Vietnam Football Federation) Becamex Bình Dương
23	MF	Trần Đức Dương	2 May 1983 (aged 23)	(Vietnam Football Federation) Mikado Nam Định
26	GK	Tô Vĩnh Lợi	22 April 1985 (aged 21)	(Vietnam Football Federation) Pisico Bình Định
27	MF	Nguyễn Minh Chuyên	9 November 1985 (aged 21)	(Vietnam Football Federation) TMN Cảng Sài Gòn
28	MF	Lương Văn Được Em	14 November 1985 (aged 21)	(Vietnam Football Federation) Đồng Tháp
