= 2009 FIFA Club World Cup squads =

The 2009 FIFA Club World Cup took place in Abu Dhabi, United Arab Emirates, from 9 December to 19 December 2009. Each of the seven teams involved were required to submit a provisional 30-man squad list (including a minimum of three goalkeepers) by 29 October 2009. The final 23-man squads had to be submitted by 25 November, with all members of the final squad taken from the provisional list. All players were required to be registered with squad numbers between 1 and 23, unless they were registered for their domestic league with a different number. In the event of an injury to one of the players on the final list, that player may be replaced with a player from the provisional list no less than 24 hours before his team's first match in the competition.

== Al-Ahli ==
Manager: (United Arab Emirates) Mahdi Redha

Note: Flags indicate national team as defined under FIFA eligibility rules; some limited exceptions apply. Players may hold more than one non-FIFA nationality.

No.	Pos.	Nation	Player
1	GK	UAE	Yousif Abdulla
3	FW	UAE	Saad Surour
5	DF	UAE	Mohammed Qassim
6	DF	UAE	Khalid Mohamed
7	DF	UAE	Obaid Khalifa
8	DF	UAE	Ali Abbas
9	FW	BRA	Baré
10	FW	UAE	Ahmad Khalil
12	MF	EGY	Hosny Abd Rabo
14	DF	UAE	Bader Yaqoot
15	FW	UAE	Ismail Al Hammadi
16	DF	UAE	Hasan Ali

No.	Pos.	Nation	Player
20	MF	UAE	Yousif Jaber
21	FW	UAE	Mohamed Fawzi
23	MF	IRN	Mehrzad Madanchi
25	DF	UAE	Abdulla Ahmad
26	MF	UAE	Salem Khamis
29	MF	UAE	Ali Hussain
30	FW	UAE	Mohamed Rashid
31	DF	UAE	Waleed Ahmed
33	GK	UAE	Saif Yousuf
35	FW	UAE	Abdulla Abdulrahman
50	GK	UAE	Obaid Mohamed

== Atlante ==
Manager: (Mexico) José Guadalupe Cruz

Note: Flags indicate national team as defined under FIFA eligibility rules; some limited exceptions apply. Players may hold more than one non-FIFA nationality.

No.	Pos.	Nation	Player
1	GK	MEX	Gerardo Daniel Ruiz
2	DF	ARG	Miguel Ángel Martínez
3	GK	ARG	Federico Vilar
5	MF	MEX	José Joel González
7	MF	MEX	Fernando Navarro
8	FW	MEX	Rafael Márquez Lugo
9	FW	URU	Horacio Peralta
10	MF	ARG	Gabriel Pereyra
11	MF	ARG	Santiago Solari
15	DF	MEX	Arturo Muñoz
17	FW	MEX	José Daniel Guerrero
18	MF	MEX	Christian Bermúdez

No.	Pos.	Nation	Player
19	MF	MEX	Guillermo Rojas
20	MF	ARG	Andrés Carevic
21	DF	MEX	Luis David Velázquez
23	DF	MEX	Gerardo Castillo
26	DF	MEX	Clemente Ovalle
27	MF	MEX	Luis Ángel Carrillo
31	FW	MEX	Daniel Arreola
34	MF	MEX	Saúl García
54	FW	MEX	Fausto Ruiz
58	GK	MEX	Antonio Perez
63	FW	BRA	Lucas Silva

== Auckland City ==
Manager: (New Zealand) Paul Posa

Note: Flags indicate national team as defined under FIFA eligibility rules; some limited exceptions apply. Players may hold more than one non-FIFA nationality.

No.	Pos.	Nation	Player
1	GK	NZL	Jacob Spoonley
3	DF	NZL	Ian Hogg
4	DF	NZL	Sam Campbell
5	MF	NZL	Matt Williams
6	MF	KOR	Lee Ki-Hyung
7	DF	NZL	James Pritchett
8	MF	NZL	Chad Coombes
9	FW	NZL	Paul Urlovic
10	FW	RSA	Grant Young
11	FW	CRO	Daniel Koprivcic
12	GK	NZL	Simon Eaddy

No.	Pos.	Nation	Player
13	MF	NZL	Alex Feneridis
14	FW	RSA	Keryn Jordan
15	DF	NZL	Ivan Vicelich
16	MF	NZL	Jason Hayne
17	MF	NZL	Adam McGeorge
18	GK	ENG	Paul Gothard
20	DF	NZL	Greg Uhlmann
21	DF	NZL	Riki van Steeden
22	MF	ENG	Adam Dickinson
25	MF	NZL	Milos Nikolic
28	MF	NZL	Dan Morgan

== Barcelona ==
Manager: (Spain) Pep Guardiola

Note: Flags indicate national team as defined under FIFA eligibility rules; some limited exceptions apply. Players may hold more than one non-FIFA nationality.

No.	Pos.	Nation	Player
1	GK	ESP	Víctor Valdés
2	DF	BRA	Dani Alves
3	DF	ESP	Gerard Piqué
4	DF	MEX	Rafael Márquez
5	DF	ESP	Carles Puyol (captain)
6	MF	ESP	Xavi
7	FW	VEN	Jeffrén
8	MF	ESP	Andrés Iniesta
9	FW	SWE	Zlatan Ibrahimović
10	FW	ARG	Lionel Messi
11	FW	ESP	Bojan Krkić
12	GK	ESP	Rubén Miño

No.	Pos.	Nation	Player
13	GK	ESP	José Manuel Pinto
14	FW	FRA	Thierry Henry
15	MF	MLI	Seydou Keita
16	MF	ESP	Sergio Busquets
17	FW	ESP	Pedro
18	DF	ARG	Gabriel Milito
19	DF	BRA	Maxwell
20	MF	MEX	Jonathan
21	DF	UKR	Dmytro Chyhrynskyi
22	DF	FRA	Eric Abidal
24	MF	CIV	Yaya Touré

== Estudiantes de La Plata ==
Manager: (Argentina) Alejandro Sabella

Note: Flags indicate national team as defined under FIFA eligibility rules; some limited exceptions apply. Players may hold more than one non-FIFA nationality.

No.	Pos.	Nation	Player
1	GK	PAR	Roberto Junior Fernández
2	MF	ARG	Leandro Desábato
3	DF	ARG	Cristian Cellay
5	MF	ARG	Matías Sánchez
6	DF	ARG	Agustín Alayes
7	FW	URU	Juan Manuel Salgueiro
8	MF	ARG	Enzo Pérez
10	MF	ARG	Marcelo Carrusca
11	MF	ARG	Juan Sebastián Verón
12	GK	ARG	César Taborda
13	DF	URU	Juan Manuel Díaz

No.	Pos.	Nation	Player
16	DF	ARG	Germán Ré
17	FW	ARG	Mauro Boselli
18	MF	ARG	Maximiliano Núñez
20	FW	ARG	Leandro González
21	DF	ARG	Marcos Rojo
22	MF	ARG	Rodrigo Braña
23	MF	ARG	Leandro Benítez
25	GK	ARG	Damián Albil
26	MF	ARG	Juan Huerta
27	FW	ARG	Jeronimo Neumann
30	DF	ARG	Clemente Rodríguez

== Pohang Steelers ==
Manager: (Brazil) Sérgio Farias

Note: Flags indicate national team as defined under FIFA eligibility rules; some limited exceptions apply. Players may hold more than one non-FIFA nationality.

No.	Pos.	Nation	Player
1	GK	KOR	Shin Hwa-Yong
2	MF	KOR	Choi Hyo-Jin
3	DF	KOR	Cho Hong-Kyu
4	DF	JPN	Kazunari Okayama
5	MF	KOR	Kim Tae-Su
6	MF	KOR	Kim Gi-Dong
7	MF	KOR	Kim Jae-Sung
8	MF	KOR	Hwang Jin-Sung
10	FW	BRA	Denilson
11	FW	KOR	Kim Meung-Chung
12	MF	KOR	Park Hee-Chul

No.	Pos.	Nation	Player
13	MF	KOR	Go Seul-Ki
14	MF	KOR	Song Chang-Ho
15	DF	KOR	Hwang Jae-Won
16	MF	KOR	Kim Jung-Kyum
17	DF	KOR	Kim Hyung-Il
18	FW	KOR	Namgung Do
19	GK	KOR	Kim Dae-Ho
20	MF	KOR	Shin Hyung-Min
21	GK	KOR	Song Dong-Jin
22	FW	KOR	No Byung-Jun
23	FW	KOR	Yoo Chang-Hyun

== TP Mazembe ==
Manager: (France) Diego Garzitto

Note: Flags indicate national team as defined under FIFA eligibility rules; some limited exceptions apply. Players may hold more than one non-FIFA nationality.

No.	Pos.	Nation	Player
1	GK	COD	Muteba Kidiaba
3	DF	COD	Kiritsho Kasusula
4	DF	COD	Miala Nkulukutu
5	DF	COD	Tshani Mukinayi
6	FW	COD	Déo Kanda A Mukok
7	FW	COD	Ndonga Mianga
8	FW	COD	Trésor Mputu
11	FW	COD	Milota Kabangu
12	DF	COD	Bawaka Mabele
13	MF	COD	Bedi Mbenza
15	FW	COD	Dioko Kaluyituka

No.	Pos.	Nation	Player
16	DF	COD	Ngoyi Mbomboko
17	MF	COD	Kayembe Lufulwabo
18	MF	COD	Luyeye Mvete
20	MF	COD	Mihayo Kazembe
21	GK	COD	Aimé Bakula
22	GK	COD	Ikamba Mpinu
23	MF	CGO	Sita Milandou
24	FW	CMR	Narcisse Ekanga
27	FW	COD	Kasongo Ngandu
28	DF	COD	Tshizeu Kanymbo
30	DF	COD	Guy Lusadisu Basisila
