= 2007–08 Jordan FA Cup =

Tournament details
- Country: Jordan
- Dates: 21 August 2007 – 6 May 2008
- Teams: 16

Final positions
- Champions: Al-Faisaly (16th title)
- Runners-up: Shabab Al-Ordon
- 2009 AFC Cup: Al-Faisaly

Tournament statistics
- Matches played: 15
- Goals scored: 44 (2.93 per match)
- Top goal scorer(s): Razzaq Farhan, Hassan Abdel-Fattah, Awad Ragheb, Odai Al-Saify, Mohammad Omar Shishani, Essam Abu Touk, Fahed Attal, Abdullah Salah (2 goals)
- All statistics correct as of July 2017.

The 2007–08 Jordan FA Cup is the 28th edition of the Jordan FA Cup since its establishment in 1980. It started on 21 August 2007 and ended on 6 May 2008. Shabab Al-Ordon were the defending champions, but they were eliminated in the final round. The winner of the competition will earn a spot in the 2009 AFC Cup.

Al-Faisaly won their 16th title after a 3–1 win over defending champions Shabab Al-Ordon in the final on 6 May 2008.

== Participating teams ==
A total of 16 teams participated in this season. 10 teams from the 2007–08 Jordan League, 6 teams from the First Division.

League	Teams
Jordan Premier League	Al-Ahli; Al-Arabi; Al-Baqa'a; Al-Faisaly; Al-Hussein; Al-Jazeera; Al-Ramtha; Al-Wehdat; Shabab Al-Hussein; Shabab Al-Ordon
1st Division	Al-Jalil; Al-Qouqazi; Al-Yarmouk; Ein Karem; Ittihad Al-Ramtha; Kufrsoum

== Bracket ==
Round of 16
H	Al-Hussein	4
A	Al-Jalil	0
A	Ittihad Al-Ramtha	1
H	Shabab Al-Ordon	2
H	Al-Ramtha	2
A	Al-Qouqazi	0
A	Al-Ahli	1
H	Al-Arabi	0
H	Al-Jazeera	2
A	Ein Karem	0
H	Al-Wehdat	6
A	Kufrsoum	0
A	Al-Yarmouk	1
H	Al-Baqa'a	4
A	Shabab Al-Hussein	0
H	Al-Faisaly	1

Quarter-finals
A	Al-Hussein	2
H	Shabab Al-Ordon	3
A	Al-Ramtha	0
H	Al-Ahli	3
A	Al-Jazeera	0
H	Al-Wehdat	1
A	Al-Baqa'a	0
H	Al-Faisaly	1

Semi-finals
A	Shabab Al-Ordon	3
H	Al-Ahli	1
H	Al-Wehdat	0
A	Al-Faisaly	2

Final
H	Shabab Al-Ordon	1
A	Al-Faisaly	3

Note: H: Home team, A: Away team

== Round of 16 ==
The Round of 16 matches were played between 21 August and 25 August 2007.

21 August 2007	Al-Hussein	4–0	Al-Jalil
17:00	Salah 11', 52'; Al-Saqer 28'; Al-Zboun 44'

22 August 2007	Al-Jazeera	2–0	Ein Karem
17:00	Attal 65' (pen.), 90'

21 August 2007	Al-Ramtha	2–0	Al-Qouqazi
17:00	Swadi 83'; Khwayleh 90'

24 August 2007	Al-Baqa'a	4–1	Al-Yarmouk
17:00	Abu Areeda 45'; Farhan 50'; Abdel-Haleem 60'; Wrikat 78'		Gaber 34'

24 August 2007	Al-Arabi	0–1	Al-Ahli
17:00			Laaroussi 90'

24 August 2007	Al-Wehdat	6–0	Kufrsoum
17:00	Ragheb 8', 58'; Deeb 24'; Abdel-Fattah 32'; Al-Sabah 81'; Al-Disi 89'

25 August 2007	Shabab Al-Ordon	2–1	Ittihad Al-Ramtha
17:00	Abu Touk 16' (pen.); Al-Bzour 25'		Al-Shorman 87'

25 August 2007	Al-Faisaly	1–0 (a.e.t.)	Shabab Al-Hussein
17:00	Al-Tall 109'

== Quarter-finals ==
The Quarter-finals matches were played between 28 December and 31 December 2007.

28 December 2007	Al-Ahli	3–0	Al-Ramtha
17:00	Shdifat 67'; Shishani 78', 88'

29 December 2007	Shabab Al-Ordon	3–2	Al-Hussein
17:00	Al-Shraideh 39'; Abdul-Zahra 52'; Al-Saify 69'		Al-Sheyab 6'; Ali Salah 74'

31 December 2007	Al-Faisaly	1–0	Al-Baqa'a
17:00	Abu Alieh 49'

31 December 2007	Al-Wehdat	1–0	Al-Jazeera
17:00	Abdel-Fattah 44'

== Semi-finals ==
The four winners of the quarter-finals progressed to the semi-finals. The semi-finals were played on 22 April 2008.

22 April 2008	Al-Wehdat	0–2	Al-Faisaly
17:00			Farhan 7'; Aqel 60' (pen.)

22 April 2008	Al-Ahli	1–3	Shabab Al-Ordon
17:00	Al-Momani 27'		Abu Touk 14' (pen.); Shehdeh 25'; Al-Saify 90'

== Final ==
The final was played on Tuesday 6 May 2008 at Prince Mohammed Stadium.

6 May 2008
17:00 AST

Shabab Al-Ordon	1–3	Al-Faisaly
Al-Maharmeh 48'	Report	Abu Keshek 21'; Mubaideen 58'; Al-Sheikh 61'

Prince Mohammed Stadium, Zarqa

== Top goalscorers ==
Rank	Player	Club	Goals
1	(Iraq) Razzaq Farhan	Al-Baqa'a and Al-Faisaly	2
1	(Jordan) Hassan Abdel-Fattah	Al-Wehdat	2
1	(Jordan) Awad Ragheb	Al-Wehdat	2
1	(Jordan) Odai Al-Saify	Shabab Al-Ordon	2
1	(Jordan) Mohammad Omar Shishani	Al-Ahli	2
1	(Jordan) Essam Abu Touk	Shabab Al-Ordon	2
1	(Palestine) Fahed Attal	Al-Jazeera	2
1	(Jordan) Abdullah Salah	Al-Hussein	2
