= Football at the 2006 Asian Games – Men's tournament =

Football tournament

Men's Football Tournament at the 2006 Asian Games
Tournament details
- Host country: Qatar
- Dates: 18 November – 15 December
- Teams: 28 (from 1 confederation)
- Venues: 7 (in 3 host cities)

Final positions
- Champions: Qatar (1st title)
- Runners-up: Iraq
- Third place: Iran
- Fourth place: South Korea

Tournament statistics
- Matches played: 40
- Goals scored: 157 (3.93 per match)
- Top scorer: (Jordan) Odai Al-Saify (7)

The men's football tournament at the 2006 Asian Games was held from 18 November to 15 December 2006 in Doha, Al-Rayyan and Al-Wakrah, Qatar.

== Group stage ==
All times are Arabia Standard Time (UTC+03:00)

=== Round 1 ===
==== Group A ====
Pos	Team	Pld	W	D	L	GF	GA	GD	Pts
1	Jordan	3	1	2	0	13	0	+13	5
2	Kyrgyzstan	3	1	2	0	9	2	+7	5
3	Tajikistan	3	1	2	0	7	3	+4	5
4	Macau	3	0	0	3	1	25	−24	0

Source: RSSSF
18 November
16:00

Jordan	0–0	Tajikistan

Al-Wakrah Stadium, Al-Wakrah
Attendance: 212
Referee: Abdullah Balideh (Qatar)

18 November
18:00

Kyrgyzstan	7–0	Macau
Sydykov 34'; Kharchenko 47'; Verevkin 62'; Ishenbayev 65'; Malinin 85', 87'; Mirzaliev 89'

Al-Wakrah Stadium, Al-Wakrah
Attendance: 212
Referee: Abdulrahman Racho (Syria)

21 November
16:00

Tajikistan	5–1	Macau
Nosirov 5'; Khasanov 40'; Makhmudov 73', 90+2'; Lao Pak Kin 74' (o.g.)		Chong In Leong 45+1'

Al-Wakrah Stadium, Al-Wakrah
Attendance: 210
Referee: Ramachandran Krishnan (Malaysia)

21 November
18:00

Jordan	0–0	Kyrgyzstan

Al-Wakrah Stadium, Al-Wakrah
Attendance: 210
Referee: Abdulrahman Al-Amri (Saudi Arabia)

24 November
16:00

Macau	0–13	Jordan
		Al-Saify 8', 9', 48', 60', 89'; Un Tak Ian 10' (o.g.); Al-Sabah 13', 16'; Mubaideen 20', 90'; Lao Pak Kin 45+1' (o.g.); Hammad 75'; Mnd. Al-Maharmeh 81'

Al-Wakrah Stadium, Al-Wakrah
Attendance: 1,011
Referee: Kadhum Auda (Iraq)

24 November
16:00

Tajikistan	2–2	Kyrgyzstan
Khasanov 5', 10'		Chikishev 21', 26'

Al-Ahli Stadium, Doha
Attendance: 150
Referee: Yang Zhiqiang (China)

==== Group B ====
Pos	Team	Pld	W	D	L	GF	GA	GD	Pts
1	Iraq	3	2	1	0	8	0	+8	7
2	Syria	3	1	2	0	4	1	+3	5
3	Singapore	3	0	2	1	1	3	−2	2
4	Indonesia	3	0	1	2	2	11	−9	1

Source: RSSSF
18 November
16:00

Singapore	0–0	Syria

Al-Ahli Stadium, Doha
Attendance: 1,000
Referee: Nasser Darwish (Jordan)

18 November
18:00

Indonesia	0–6	Iraq
		Jassim 18'; Abid Ali 24'; Karim 36' (pen.), 63'; Mansour 82'; Rehema 89'

Al-Ahli Stadium, Doha
Attendance: 1,300
Referee: Yang Zhiqiang (China)

21 November
16:00

Syria	4–1	Indonesia
Al-Agha 2', 11'; Al-Sayed 17'; Al-Hamwi 87'		Gherry 50'

Al-Ahli Stadium, Doha
Attendance: 1,000
Referee: Abdulrahman Abdou (Qatar)

21 November
18:00

Iraq	2–0	Singapore
Karim 5'; Mahmoud 7'

Al-Ahli Stadium, Doha
Attendance: 300
Referee: Abdullah Balideh (Qatar)

24 November
18:00

Indonesia	1–1	Singapore
Tony 53'		Ashrin 83' (pen.)

Al-Wakrah Stadium, Al-Wakrah
Attendance: 1,803
Referee: Nasser Darwish (Jordan)

24 November
18:00

Iraq	0–0	Syria

Al-Ahli Stadium, Doha
Attendance: 2,200
Referee: Ramachandran Krishnan (Malaysia)

=== Round 2 ===
==== Group A ====
Pos	Team	Pld	W	D	L	GF	GA	GD	Pts
1	Uzbekistan	3	3	0	0	6	2	+4	9
2	Qatar	3	2	0	1	7	2	+5	6
3	United Arab Emirates	3	0	1	2	3	7	−4	1
4	Jordan	3	0	1	2	2	7	−5	1

Source: RSSSF
28 November
17:15

United Arab Emirates	1–2	Uzbekistan
Saqr 69'		Geynrikh 44', 55'

Al-Sadd Stadium, Al Rayyan
Attendance: 3,005
Referee: Bae Jae-yong (South Korea)

28 November
19:45

Qatar	3–0	Jordan
Soria 6'; Lami 69'; Yasser 71'

Al-Sadd Stadium, Al Rayyan
Attendance: 9,123
Referee: Hiroyoshi Takayama (Japan)

2 December
17:15

United Arab Emirates	1–1	Jordan
Khamis 59'		Al-Saify 45'

Al-Sadd Stadium, Al Rayyan
Attendance: 4,822
Referee: Yang Zhiqiang (China)

2 December
19:45

Uzbekistan	1–0	Qatar
Geynrikh 67'

Al-Sadd Stadium, Al Rayyan
Attendance: 12,000
Referee: Ramachandran Krishnan (Malaysia)

5 December
19:45

Qatar	4–1	United Arab Emirates
Soria 8', 54' (pen.); Koni 19'; Rizik 62'		Jaber 64'

Al-Sadd Stadium, Al Rayyan
Attendance: 12,000
Referee: Yang Zhiqiang (China)

5 December
19:45

Uzbekistan	3–1	Jordan
Geynrikh 11'; Denisov 47'; Djeparov 74'		Al-Saify 35'

Al-Gharrafa Stadium, Al Rayyan
Attendance: 106
Referee: Mahmoud Rafiei (Iran)

==== Group B ====
Pos	Team	Pld	W	D	L	GF	GA	GD	Pts
1	South Korea	3	3	0	0	6	0	+6	9
2	Bahrain	3	2	0	1	7	3	+4	6
3	Vietnam	3	1	0	2	6	5	+1	3
4	Bangladesh	3	0	0	3	2	13	−11	0

Source: RSSSF
28 November
17:15

South Korea	3–0	Bangladesh
Lee Chun-soo 2'; Park Chu-young 58', 73'

Al-Gharrafa Stadium, Al Rayyan
Attendance: 102
Referee: Marat Ismailov (Uzbekistan)

28 November
19:45

Bahrain	2–1	Vietnam
Adnan 33', 44' (pen.)		Lê Công Vinh 40'

Al-Gharrafa Stadium, Al Rayyan
Attendance: 75
Referee: Ajjagowder Arjunan (India)

2 December
17:15

Vietnam	0–2	South Korea
		Lee Ho 7'; Kim Jin-kyu 90+2'

Al-Arabi Stadium, Doha
Attendance: 1,112
Referee: Abdullah Balideh (Qatar)

2 December
19:45

Bahrain	5–1	Bangladesh
Abdullatif 27', 72'; M. Husain 39' (pen.), 75'; Adnan 80'		Z. Hossain 88'

Al-Arabi Stadium, Doha
Attendance: 168
Referee: Ng Kai Lam (Hong Kong)

5 December
19:45

South Korea	1–0	Bahrain
Oh Beom-seok 57'

Al-Rayyan Stadium, Al Rayyan
Attendance: 412
Referee: Ramachandran Krishnan (Malaysia)

5 December
19:45

Vietnam	5–1	Bangladesh
Phan Thanh Bình 13', 47', 49'; Lê Công Vinh 72'; Lê Tấn Tài 76'		Munna 41'

Al-Arabi Stadium, Doha
Attendance: 1,475
Referee: Atallah Al-Enezi (Kuwait)

==== Group C ====
Pos	Team	Pld	W	D	L	GF	GA	GD	Pts
1	Thailand	3	3	0	0	4	0	+4	9
2	Kuwait	3	2	0	1	5	1	+4	6
3	Kyrgyzstan	3	1	0	2	3	5	−2	3
4	Palestine	3	0	0	3	0	6	−6	0

Source: RSSSF
28 November
17:15

Thailand	1–0	Palestine
Nuchnum 11'

Al-Rayyan Stadium, Al Rayyan
Attendance: 501
Referee: Ali Al-Badwawi (United Arab Emirates)

28 November
19:45

Kuwait	3–0	Kyrgyzstan
Rashed 57'; Al-Musawi 74'; B. Al-Mutawa 90+1'

Al-Rayyan Stadium, Al Rayyan
Attendance: 202
Referee: Ng Kai Lam (Hong Kong)

2 December
17:15

Kyrgyzstan	0–2	Thailand
		Winothai 7'; Suksomkit 46'

Al-Rayyan Stadium, Al Rayyan
Attendance: 990
Referee: Kadhum Auda (Iraq)

2 December
19:45

Kuwait	2–0	Palestine
H. Al-Enezi 15'; A. Al-Mutawa 70'

Al-Rayyan Stadium, Al Rayyan
Attendance: 296
Referee: Hiroyoshi Takayama (Japan)

5 December
17:15

Thailand	1–0	Kuwait
Winothai 37' (pen.)

Al-Gharrafa Stadium, Al-Rayyan
Attendance: 1,800
Referee: Ajjagowder Arjunan (India)

5 December
17:15

Palestine	0–3	Kyrgyzstan
		Kharchenko 39'; Ablakimov 42'; Valiev 58'

Al-Rayyan Stadium, Al Rayyan
Attendance: 412
Referee: Hiroyoshi Takayama (Japan)

==== Group D ====
Pos	Team	Pld	W	D	L	GF	GA	GD	Pts
1	Iran	3	3	0	0	7	2	+5	9
2	Hong Kong	3	1	1	1	3	3	0	4
3	India	3	1	1	1	3	4	−1	4
4	Maldives	3	0	0	3	2	6	−4	0

Source: RSSSF
29 November
17:15

India	1–1	Hong Kong
Pradeep 88'		Chan Siu Ki 90+2'

Al-Gharrafa Stadium, Al Rayyan
Attendance: 100
Referee: Jaafar Mahfoodh (Bahrain)

29 November
19:45

Iran	3–1	Maldives
Borhani 15'; Zare 22'; Kolahkaj 86'		Ali 77'

Al-Gharrafa Stadium, Al Rayyan
Attendance: 800
Referee: Atallah Al-Enezi (Kuwait)

3 December
17:15

India	2–1	Maldives
I. Singh 34'; Chakrobarty 89'		Ashfaq 38'

Al-Sadd Stadium, Al Rayyan
Attendance: 800
Referee: Ali Al-Badwawi (United Arab Emirates)

3 December
19:45

Hong Kong	1–2	Iran
Sham Kwok Keung 8'		Zare 39'; Borhani 64' (pen.)

Al-Sadd Stadium, Al Rayyan
Attendance: 1,100
Referee: Atallah Al-Enezi (Kuwait)

6 December
17:15

Iran	2–0	India
Akbari 78'; Borhani 90+2'

Al-Sadd Stadium, Al Rayyan
Attendance: 3,500
Referee: Abdulrahman Abdou (Qatar)

6 December
17:15

Hong Kong	1–0	Maldives
Guy 11'

Al-Gharrafa Stadium, Al Rayyan
Attendance: 40
Referee: Kadhum Auda (Iraq)

==== Group E ====
Pos	Team	Pld	W	D	L	GF	GA	GD	Pts
1	China	3	3	0	0	6	2	+4	9
2	Iraq	3	2	0	1	6	1	+5	6
3	Oman	3	1	0	2	4	5	−1	3
4	Malaysia	3	0	0	3	2	10	−8	0

Source: RSSSF
29 November
17:15

Oman	3–1	Malaysia
Nor Farhan 40' (o.g.); I. Al-Gheilani 57'; Al-Maimani 90+1'		Hardi 62'

Al-Arabi Stadium, Doha
Attendance: 552
Referee: Abdulrahman Racho (Syria)

29 November
19:45

China	1–0	Iraq
Zhou Haibin 7'

Al-Arabi Stadium, Doha
Attendance: 615
Referee: Abdulrahman Abdou (Qatar)

3 December
17:15

Malaysia	1–3	China
Hardi 66'		Zhou Haibin 41'; Gao Lin 52'; Feng Xiaoting 72'

Al-Arabi Stadium, Doha
Attendance: 521
Referee: Bae Jae-yong (South Korea)

3 December
19:45

Oman	0–2	Iraq
		Rehema 30'; Abdul-Zahra 45+2'

Al-Arabi Stadium, Doha
Attendance: 2,373
Referee: Ajjagowder Arjunan (India)

6 December
19:45

Malaysia	0–4	Iraq
		Rehema 14'; Mahmoud 54', 55'; Karim 65'

Al-Arabi Stadium, Doha
Attendance: 2,357
Referee: Nasser Darwish (Jordan)

6 December
19:45

China	2–1	Oman
Gao Lin 42'; Zheng Zhi 55' (pen.)		Al-Mukhaini 29' (pen.)

Qatar SC Stadium, Doha
Attendance: 2,005
Referee: Marat Ismailov (Uzbekistan)

==== Group F ====
Pos	Team	Pld	W	D	L	GF	GA	GD	Pts
1	North Korea	3	2	1	0	3	1	+2	7
2	Japan	3	2	0	1	5	4	+1	6
3	Syria	3	1	1	1	2	1	+1	4
4	Pakistan	3	0	0	3	2	6	−4	0

Source: RSSSF
29 November
17:15

Japan	3–2	Pakistan
K. Honda 2'; Taniguchi 32', 57'		Rasool 61'; Akram 82'

Qatar SC Stadium, Doha
Attendance: 207
Referee: Ranjith Arachchilage (Sri Lanka)

29 November
19:45

North Korea	0–0	Syria

Qatar SC Stadium, Doha
Attendance: 1,002
Referee: Nasser Darwish (Jordan)

3 December
17:15

Syria	0–1	Japan
		Hirayama 77'

Qatar SC Stadium, Doha
Attendance: 2,002
Referee: Mahmoud Rafiei (Iran)

3 December
19:45

North Korea	1–0	Pakistan
Kim Chol-ho 53'

Qatar SC Stadium, Doha
Attendance: 254
Referee: Marat Ismailov (Uzbekistan)

6 December
17:15

Syria	2–0	Pakistan
Al-Sayed 41', 89'

Al-Arabi Stadium, Doha
Attendance: 438
Referee: Jaafar Mahfoodh (Bahrain)

6 December
17:15

Japan	1–2	North Korea
Ichiyanagi 7'		Hong Yong-jo 4'; Kim Yong-jun 63'

Qatar SC Stadium, Doha
Attendance: 2,013
Referee: Ali Al-Badwawi (United Arab Emirates)

==== Second-placed teams ====
Pos	Team	Pld	W	D	L	GF	GA	GD	Pts
1	Qatar	3	2	0	1	7	2	+5	6
2	Iraq	3	2	0	1	6	1	+5	6
3	Bahrain	3	2	0	1	7	3	+4	6
4	Kuwait	3	2	0	1	5	1	+4	6
5	Japan	3	2	0	1	5	4	+1	6
6	Hong Kong	3	1	1	1	3	3	0	4

Source: RSSSF

== Knockout stage ==
Quarterfinals
9 December
Thailand	0
Qatar	3
9 December
China	2 (7)
Iran (p)	2 (8)
9 December
Uzbekistan	1
Iraq (a.e.t.)	2
9 December
South Korea	3
North Korea	0

Semifinals
12 December
Qatar	2
Iran	0
12 December
Iraq	1
South Korea	0

Gold medal match
15 December
Qatar	1
Iraq	0
Bronze medal match
14 December
Iran (a.e.t.)	1
South Korea	0

=== Quarterfinals ===
9 December
16:00

China	2–2 (a.e.t.)	Iran
Feng Xiaoting 51'; Zhou Haibin 98'		Borhani 39'; Hosseini 105+1'
Penalties
Zheng Zhi (penalty missed); Sun Xiang (penalty scored); Cui Peng (penalty scored); Zhou Haibin (penalty scored); Zhao Xuri (penalty scored); Feng Xiaoting (penalty scored); Hao Junmin (penalty scored); Liu Yu (penalty scored); Zhao Ming (penalty missed)	7–8	(penalty scored) Borhani; (penalty scored) Yavarzadeh; (penalty missed) Zare; (penalty scored) Akbari; (penalty scored) Heidari; (penalty scored) Oladi; (penalty scored) Hosseini; (penalty scored) Montazeri; (penalty scored) Arzani

Al-Rayyan Stadium, Al Rayyan
Attendance: 4,724
Referee: Nasser Darwish (Jordan)

9 December
16:00

Uzbekistan	1–2 (a.e.t.)	Iraq
Geynrikh 45+1'		Jassim 10'; Mansour 95'

Al-Gharrafa Stadium, Al Rayyan
Attendance: 2,525
Referee: Ramachandran Krishnan (Malaysia)

9 December
19:00

Thailand	0–3	Qatar
		Ibrahim 26', 50'; Koni 51'

Al-Gharrafa Stadium, Al Rayyan
Attendance: 15,000
Referee: Hiroyoshi Takayama (Japan)

9 December
19:00

South Korea	3–0	North Korea
Kim Chi-woo 31'; Yeom Ki-hun 34'; Jung Jo-gook 57'

Al-Rayyan Stadium, Al Rayyan
Attendance: 4,728
Referee: Abdulrahman Racho (Syria)

=== Semifinals ===
12 December
16:00

Iraq	1–0	South Korea
Saeed 24'

Al-Gharrafa Stadium, Al Rayyan
Attendance: 3,150
Referee: Ali Al-Badwawi (United Arab Emirates)

12 December
19:00

Qatar	2–0	Iran
Soria 28'; Yasser 74'

Al-Sadd Stadium, Al Rayyan
Attendance: 15,800
Referee: Yang Zhiqiang (China)

=== Bronze medal match ===
14 December
17:30

Iran	1–0 (a.e.t.)	South Korea
Kolahkaj 114'

Al-Gharrafa Stadium, Al Rayyan
Attendance: 428
Referee: Abdulrahman Abdou (Qatar)

=== Gold medal match ===
15 December
16:00

Qatar	1–0	Iraq
B. Mohammed 63'

Al-Sadd Stadium, Al Rayyan
Attendance: 15,000
Referee: Hiroyoshi Takayama (Japan)

== Goalscorers ==
7 goals

- Odai Al-Saify (JOR)

5 goals

- Alexander Geynrikh (UZB)

4 goals

- Arash Borhani (IRI)
- Mustafa Karim (IRQ)
- Sebastián Soria (QAT)

3 goals

- Sayed Mohamed Adnan (BRN)
- Zhou Haibin (CHN)
- Younis Mahmoud (IRQ)
- Ali Rehema (IRQ)
- Maher Al-Sayed (SYR)
- Bakhtier Khasanov (TJK)
- Phan Thanh Bình (VIE)

2 goals

- Ismail Abdullatif (BRN)
- Mohamed Husain (BRN)
- Feng Xiaoting (CHN)
- Gao Lin (CHN)
- Adel Kolahkaj (IRI)
- Maziar Zare (IRI)
- Karrar Jassim (IRQ)
- Ali Mansour (IRQ)
- Issa Al-Sabah (JOR)
- Essam Mubaideen (JOR)
- Hiroyuki Taniguchi (JPN)
- Sergey Chikishev (KGZ)
- Vadim Kharchenko (KGZ)
- Evgeniy Malinin (KGZ)
- Park Chu-young (KOR)
- Hardi Jaafar (MAS)
- Khalfan Ibrahim (QAT)
- Abdulla Koni (QAT)
- Hussein Yasser (QAT)
- Abdulfattah Al-Agha (SYR)
- Teeratep Winothai (THA)
- Khurshed Makhmudov (TJK)
- Lê Công Vinh (VIE)

1 goal

- Mohamed Zahid Hossain (BAN)
- Motiur Rahman Munna (BAN)
- Zheng Zhi (CHN)
- Chan Siu Ki (HKG)
- Gerard Ambassa Guy (HKG)
- Sham Kwok Keung (HKG)
- Gherry Setya (INA)
- Tony Sucipto (INA)
- Subhas Sumbhu Chakrobarty (IND)
- Pappachen Pradeep (IND)
- Irungbam Surkumar Singh (IND)
- Jalal Akbari (IRI)
- Jalal Hosseini (IRI)
- Ahmed Abid Ali (IRQ)
- Alaa Abdul-Zahra (IRQ)
- Samer Saeed (IRQ)
- Mohannad Al-Maharmeh (JOR)
- Musa Hammad (JOR)
- Sota Hirayama (JPN)
- Keisuke Honda (JPN)
- Yugo Ichiyanagi (JPN)
- Roman Ablakimov (KGZ)
- Azamat Ishenbayev (KGZ)
- Almazbek Mirzaliev (KGZ)
- Ruslan Sydykov (KGZ)
- Timur Valiev (KGZ)
- Vladimir Verevkin (KGZ)
- Jung Jo-gook (KOR)
- Kim Chi-woo (KOR)
- Kim Jin-kyu (KOR)
- Lee Chun-soo (KOR)
- Lee Ho (KOR)
- Oh Beom-seok (KOR)
- Yeom Ki-hun (KOR)
- Hamad Al-Enezi (KUW)
- Hussain Al-Musawi (KUW)
- Abdullah Al-Mutawa (KUW)
- Bader Al-Mutawa (KUW)
- Mohammad Rashed (KUW)
- Chong In Leong (MAC)
- Ashad Ali (MDV)
- Ali Ashfaq (MDV)
- Ibrahim Al-Gheilani (OMA)
- Badar Al-Maimani (OMA)
- Ahmed Hadid Al-Mukhaini (OMA)
- Naveed Akram (PAK)
- Muhammad Rasool (PAK)
- Hong Yong-jo (PRK)
- Kim Chol-ho (PRK)
- Kim Yong-jun (PRK)
- Adel Lami (QAT)
- Bilal Mohammed (QAT)
- Wesam Rizik (QAT)
- Ashrin Shariff (SIN)
- Mohammad Al-Hamwi (SYR)
- Suchao Nuchnum (THA)
- Sutee Suksomkit (THA)
- Naim Nosirov (TJK)
- Yousif Jaber (UAE)
- Ahmed Khamis (UAE)
- Adel Saqr (UAE)
- Vitaliy Denisov (UZB)
- Server Djeparov (UZB)
- Lê Tấn Tài (VIE)

1 own goal

- Un Tak Ian (MAC) (against JOR)
- Nor Farhan Muhammad (MAS) (against OMA)

2 own goals

- Lao Pak Kin (MAC) (against JOR and TJK)

== Venues ==
- Al-Wakrah Stadium
- Al-Ahli Stadium
- Al-Sadd Stadium
- Al-Gharafa Stadium
- Al-Rayyan Stadium
- Al-Arabi Stadium
- Qatar SC Stadium

== Final standing ==
Rank	Team	Pld	W	D	L	GF	GA	GD	Pts
1st place, gold medalist(s)	Qatar	6	5	0	1	13	2	+11	15
2nd place, silver medalist(s)	Iraq	9	6	1	2	17	3	+14	19
3rd place, bronze medalist(s)	Iran	6	4	1	1	10	6	+4	13
4	South Korea	6	4	0	2	9	2	+7	12
5	China	4	3	1	0	8	4	+4	10
6	Uzbekistan	4	3	0	1	7	4	+3	9
7	Thailand	4	3	0	1	4	3	+1	9
8	North Korea	4	2	1	1	3	4	−1	7
9	Bahrain	3	2	0	1	7	3	+4	6
10	Kuwait	3	2	0	1	5	1	+4	6
11	Japan	3	2	0	1	5	4	+1	6
12	Syria	6	2	3	1	6	2	+4	9
13	Hong Kong	3	1	1	1	3	3	0	4
14	India	3	1	1	1	3	4	−1	4
15	Vietnam	3	1	0	2	6	5	+1	3
16	Oman	3	1	0	2	4	5	−1	3
17	Kyrgyzstan	6	2	2	2	12	7	+5	8
18	United Arab Emirates	3	0	1	2	3	7	−4	1
19	Jordan	6	1	3	2	15	7	+8	6
20	Maldives	3	0	0	3	2	6	−4	0
21	Pakistan	3	0	0	3	2	6	−4	0
22	Palestine	3	0	0	3	0	6	−6	0
23	Malaysia	3	0	0	3	2	10	−8	0
24	Bangladesh	3	0	0	3	2	13	−11	0
25	Tajikistan	3	1	2	0	7	3	+4	5
26	Singapore	3	0	2	1	1	3	−2	2
27	Indonesia	3	0	1	2	2	11	−9	1
28	Macau	3	0	0	3	1	25	−24	0
