= Omar Shishani =

Omar Shishani may refer to

- Mohammad Omar Shishani, Jordanian football player
- Abu Omar al-Shishani, commander for the Islamic State in Syria
