= Radik Vodopyanov =

Kyrgyzstani footballer

Personal information
- Full name: Radik Vodopyanov
- Date of birth: 20 August 1984 (age 42)
- Place of birth: Bishkek, Kirghiz Soviet Socialist Republic, Soviet Union
- Height: 1.85 m (6 ft 1 in)
- Position: Central defender

Senior career*
Years	Team	Apps	(Gls)
2002–2003	Dordoi		
2003–2006	SKA-Shoro Bishkek		
2006	FC Muras-Sport Bishkek		
2007	FC Zhashtyk-Ak-Altyn Kara-Suu		
2007–2008	Aviator AAL Bishkek		
2008–2009	FC Sher Bishkek		

International career^{‡}
2004	Kyrgyzstan U21		
2004–2007	Kyrgyzstan	5	(0)
- * Club domestic league appearances and goals ‡ National team caps and goals as of 26 August 2007

Radik Vodopyanov (born 20 August 1984, Russian: Водопьянов Радик Юрьевич) is a former Kyrgystani footballer, having represented the national team from 2004 to 2007.
