= Abdullah Msheleh =

Kuwaiti footballer

Personal information
- Full name: Abdullah Msheleh Al-Marzouq (Arabic:عبدالله مشيلح المرزوق)
- Date of birth: 19 July 1985 (age 41)
- Place of birth: Kuwait City, Kuwait
- Position: Defender

Senior career*
| Years | Team | Apps | (Gls) |
| 2004–2010 | Al Tadamon | | |
| 2010–2011 | Al Nasr | | |
| 2011–2014 | Al Naser | | |
| 2014–? | Al-Sulaibikhat | | |
| ?–2020 | Al Tadamon | | |

International career
| | Kuwait | 2 | (1) |
- * Club domestic league appearances and goals as of 14:43, 18 February 2011 (UTC)

Abdullah Msheleh Al-Marzouq (Arabic: عبدالله مشيلح المرزوق; born 19 July 1985) is a Kuwaiti footballer currently playing with Al Nasr in Kuwaiti Premier League. He previously played for Kuwait's Al-Tadamon before transferring to Omani club Al-Nasr in late 2010.
