= Luis Ángel Carrillo =

Mexican footballer (born 1986)

Personal information
- Full name: Luis Ángel Carrillo Alvarado
- Date of birth: 27 January 1986 (age 40)
- Place of birth: Cancún, Quintana Roo, Mexico
- Height: 1.63 m (5 ft 4 in)
- Position: Midfielder

Youth career
- 2007–2008: Pioneros de Cancún

Senior career*
Years	Team	Apps	(Gls)
2008–2009	Potros Chetumal	5	(0)
2009–2010	Atlante	2	(1)
- * Club domestic league appearances and goals

Luis Ángel Carrillo Alvarado (born 27 January 1986) is a Mexican former football midfielder.

Carrillo made his professional debut on April 26, 2009, during a 1–0 loss to CF Monterrey. He played all 90 minutes.
