= Ebrahim Shehab =

Kuwaiti footballer

Ibrahim Shehab
Personal information
- Full name: Ebrahim Adnan Shehab Saleh
- Date of birth: January 20, 1986 (age 40)
- Place of birth: Kuwait City, Kuwait
- Height: 1.70 m (5 ft 7 in)
- Position: Midfielder

Team information
- Current team: Al Kuwait

Youth career
- 2005–2007: Al Kuwait

Senior career*
| Years | Team | Apps | (Gls) |
| 2007–2014 | Al Kuwait | | |

International career^{‡}
| 2007 | Kuwait U21 | | |
| 2008–2009 | Kuwait | 4 | (0) |

Managerial career
- 2017–2022: Kuwait (director assistant)
- * Club domestic league appearances and goals as of November 5, 2010 ‡ National team caps and goals as of November 5, 2010

Ebrahim Shehab (Arabic: إبراهيم شهاب, born 20 January 1986) is a Kuwaiti footballer who is a midfielder for the Kuwaiti Premier League club Al Kuwait.
