= Aimé Bakula =

Congolese footballer

Personal information
- Full name: Aimé Bakula
- Date of birth: 14 February 1985 (age 41)
- Place of birth: Kinshasa, Zaire
- Height: 1.78 m (5 ft 10 in)
- Position: Goalkeeper

Senior career*
Years	Team	Apps	(Gls)
2007–2022	TP Mazembe	192	(0)
2022–	CS Don Bosco	–	(–)
- * Club domestic league appearances and goals

Aimé Bakula (born 14 February 1985) is a Congolese former professional footballer who played as a goalkeeper. He spent over a decade with TP Mazembe before a loan spell at CS Don Bosco and was part of Mazembe’s most successful era.

== Club career ==
Bakula began his senior career with TP Mazembe in 2007, largely serving as a backup to Robert Kidiaba but still making 192 appearances for the club. During his time at Mazembe, he won multiple domestic league titles and continental honours, including two CAF Champions League trophies.

In October 2017, he was loaned to CS Don Bosco for one season to gain more playing time. He returned to TP Mazembe in July 2018 and signed a two-year contract extension running through June 2020.

== Later career ==
By 2025, Bakula was playing for CS Don Bosco again in the Linafoot league. He was named Man of the Match in several games, including against Blessing FC and AS Maniema Union, earning praise for his reflexes and composure even at the age of 40.

== Honours ==
=== TP Mazembe ===
- CAF Champions League: 2009, 2010, 2015
- CAF Super Cup: 2010, 2011, 2016
- DR Congo League: 2007, 2009, 2011–2014, 2017
- FIFA Club World Cup runner-up: 2010

== Style of play ==
Bakula was regarded as a composed and reliable goalkeeper, often praised for his leadership and mentorship of younger players.
