= Abdullah Al-Noubi (footballer, born 1987) =

Emirati footballer

Personal information
- Full name: Abdullah Belal Saeed Al-Noubi
- Date of birth: 8 January 1987 (age 39)
- Place of birth: Abu Dhabi, United Arab Emirates
- Height: 1.72 m (5 ft 8 in)
- Positions: Winger; full back

Youth career
- –2005: Al Wahda

Senior career*
Years	Team	Apps	(Gls)
2005–2009	Al Wahda	46	(1)
2009–2012	Al Dhafra	37	(1)
2012–2016	Al Wahda	74	(1)
2016–2018	Baniyas	19	(0)

International career
2007–2008	United Arab Emirates	8	(0)
- * Club domestic league appearances and goals

Abdullah Al-Noubi (Arabic:عبد الله النوبي; born 8 January 1987) is an Emirati footballer who played as a winger or full back.
