= Ayman Al-Hindi =

Palestinian footballer

Personal information
- Date of birth: January 5, 1986 (age 40)
- Place of birth: Jericho, Palestine
- Height: 5 ft 8 in (1.73 m)
- Position: Winger

Team information
- Current team: Shabab Al-Khaleel

Youth career
- 2006: Gaza Sports

Senior career*
| Years | Team | Apps | (Gls) |
| 2007 | Gaza Sports | ? | (?) |
| 2008–2010 | Shabab Al-Am'ari | ? | (?) |
| 2010–2012 | Shabab Al-Khaleel | ? | (1) |
| 2012 | Gaza Sport | ? | (1) |

International career^{‡}
| 2009– | Palestine | 2 | (0) |
- * Club domestic league appearances and goals as of 17 March 2012 ‡ National team caps and goals as of 17 March 2012

Ayman Al-Hindi (born 5 January 1986) is a Palestinian football midfielder, who plays for Palestine football club Gaza Sports. He plays on a central and left midfield position.

Al-Hindi captained the senior Palestine national football team through its first competitive international played within the West Bank, a 1–1 draw with Jordan.
