= FC Muras-Sport Bishkek =

Kyrgyz football club

Muras-Sport Bishkek
- Full name: FC Muras-Sport Bishkek
- Ground: Bishkek, Kyrgyzstan
- League: Kyrgyzstan League
- 2006: Kyrgyzstan League, 4th

FC Muras-Sport Bishkek was a Kyrgyzstani football club based in Bishkek, that played in the top division Kyrgyzstan League.

== History ==
- 2006; 19 years ago: Founded as FC Muras-Sport Bishkek
- 2007; 18 years ago: Dissolved

Muras-Sport was the second team of Dordoy-Dinamo. The team was also used as a base for youth national teams.

== Achievements ==
- Kyrgyzstan League
  - 4th place: 2006
