= Ali Hussain (footballer) =

Emirati footballer (born 1985)

Personal information
- Full name: Ali Hussain Yousif Al-Mazam
- Date of birth: 21 October 1985 (age 41)
- Place of birth: United Arab Emirates
- Height: 1.69 m (5 ft 7 in)
- Position: Midfielder

Youth career
- Al-Ahli

Senior career*
| Years | Team | Apps | (Gls) |
| 2005–2013 | Al-Ahli | | |
| 2013–2019 | Al Nasr | 67 | (1) |
| 2019-2021 | Khor Fakkan | 0 | (0) |
- * Club domestic league appearances and goals

Ali Hussain Yousif Al-Mazam (Arabic: علي حسين; born 21 October 1985) is an Emirati footballer.
