= Bader Yaqoot =

Emirati footballer (born 1985)

Personal information
- Full name: Bader Yaqoot Nasser Al-Juraishi
- Date of birth: December 13, 1985 (age 40)
- Place of birth: UAE
- Height: 1.77 m (5 ft 10 in)
- Position: Defender

Senior career*
Years	Team	Apps	(Gls)
2004–2010	Al Ahli		
2010–2015	Al Nasr	18	(0)
2015–2016	Ajman		
2016–2017	Masfout		

International career
2006	UAE	1	(0)
- * Club domestic league appearances and goals

Bader Yaqoot (born December 13, 1985) is a football player from the United Arab Emirates.
