= Subhas Sumbhu Chakraborty =

Indian footballer (born 1985)

Subhas Chakraborty
Personal information
- Full name: Subhas Sumbhu Chakraborty
- Date of birth: 23 October 1985 (age 41)
- Place of birth: Kolkata, India
- Height: 1.71 m (5 ft 7 1/2 in)
- Position: Midfielder

Team information
- Current team: Mumbai F.C.
- Number: 11

Youth career
- 2000–2002: Tata FA

Senior career*
Years	Team	Apps	(Gls)
2002–2005	East Bengal		
2005–2006	Mahindra United	13	(0)
2006–2008	Mohun Bagan		
2008–2010	Mumbai		
2010–2012	Prayag United		
2012–2014	Mumbai	20	(0)
2014–2015	Kenkre		
2015–2018	Air India		

International career
2006	India U23		
2003–2005	India	6	(0)
- * Club domestic league appearances and goals as of 21 January 2014

Subhas Sumbhu Chakraborty (born 23 October 1985) is retired Indian football player who last played for Mumbai in the I-League as a midfielder.
