= Waleed Ahmed =

Emirati footballer (born 1986)

Personal information
- Full name: Waleed Ahmed Hassan Al-Mazam
- Date of birth: 22 January 1986 (age 40)
- Place of birth: United Arab Emirates
- Height: 1.72 m (5 ft 8 in)
- Position: Winger

Youth career
- Al-Ahli

Senior career*
Years	Team	Apps	(Gls)
2005–2010	Al-Ahli		
2009	→ Ajman (loan)		
2010–2015	Ajman		
2015–2018	Al-Sharjah	44	(2)
2018	Dibba Al-Fujairah		
2018–2019	Ittihad Kalba	19	(0)
2019–2020	Hatta	4	(0)
2020–2022	Al Hamriyah		
- * Club domestic league appearances and goals

Waleed Ahmed Hassan Al-Mazam (Arabic:وليد أحمد; born 22 January 1986) is an Emirati footballer. He plays as a winger. He has played in the Arabian Gulf League, Arabian Gulf Cup, and President's Cup in the UAE.
