= Amer Wrikat =

Jordanian footballer

Personal information
- Full name: Amer Qasem Wrikat
- Date of birth: February 14, 1986 (age 40)
- Place of birth: Amman, Jordan
- Position: Midfielder

Senior career*
Years	Team	Apps	(Gls)
2005–2012	Al-Baqa'a SC		
2012–2013	Al-Faisaly (Amman)		
2012–2013	That Ras		
2013–2014	Al-Baqa'a SC		
2014–2015	Sahab SC		
2015–2020	Balama SC		

International career
2006–2008	Jordan U-23		
2007–2008	Jordan	2	
- * Club domestic league appearances and goals

Amer Qasem Wrikat is a retired Jordanian footballer.
