= Mohammad Omar Shishani =

Jordanian football player (born 1989)

Mohammad Shishani
Personal information
- Full name: Mohammad Omar Shishani
- Date of birth: April 24, 1989 (age 37)
- Place of birth: Amman, Jordan
- Height: 1.76 m (5 ft 9 in)
- Position: Striker

Team information
- Current team: Al-Faisaly
- Number: 4

Senior career*
Years	Team	Apps	(Gls)
2006–2011	Al-Ahli		
2010	→ Al-Baqa'a (loan)		
2011–2014	Shabab Al-Ordon		
2014–2015	Al-Ramtha		
2015–2016	Al-Hussein		
2016–2017	Shabab Al-Ordon		
2017–	Al-Faisaly		

International career^{‡}
2006–2008	Jordan U20		
2010–2011	Jordan U23		
2016	Jordan	1	(0)
- * Club domestic league appearances and goals ‡ National team caps and goals as of 15 November 2016

Mohammad Omar Shishani (Arabic: محمد عمر شيشاني) (born April 24, 1989) is a Jordanian football player who plays as a striker for Al-Faisaly.

== International career statistics ==
As of 15 November 2016

Jordan national team
Year	Apps	Goals
2016	1	0
Total	1	0
