= Essam Mubaideen =

Jordanian footballer

Personal information
- Full name: Essam Abdallah Ibrahim Mubaideen
- Date of birth: 15 June 1986 (age 40)
- Place of birth: Al Karak, Jordan
- Position: Midfielder

Senior career*
Years	Team	Apps	(Gls)
2005–2012	Al-Faisaly		
2012–2015	Shabab Al-Ordon		
2015–2016	Al-Faisaly		
2016–2018	Al-Jazeera		
2018–2019	Al-Salt SC		

International career
2006–2007	Jordan U-23		(2)
2013–2014	Jordan	4	(0)
- * Club domestic league appearances and goals

Essam Abdallah Ibrahim Mubaideen (Arabic: عصام عبد الله ابراهيم مبيضين, born 15 June 1986) is a retired Jordanian footballer.

== International career ==
Essam's first match with the Jordan national senior team was against Belarus in an international friendly held on 21 March 2013 in Amman, which resulted in a 1–0 victory for Jordan.

== International goals ==
#	Date	Venue	Opponent	Score	Result	Competition
1	November 24, 2006	Al-Wakrah	Macau	13-0	Win	Football at the 2006 Asian Games (2 Goals)
