= Mohannad Al-Maharmeh =

Jordanian footballer

Personal information
- Full name: Mohannad Othman Al-Maharmeh
- Date of birth: December 30, 1986 (age 39)
- Place of birth: Sahab, Jordan
- Height: 1.68 m (5 ft 6 in)
- Position: Midfielder

Team information
- Current team: Al-Jazeera (Team Manager)

Youth career
- 2003–2004: University of Jordan FC

Senior career*
Years	Team	Apps	(Gls)
2005–2011	Shabab Al-Ordon		
2010–2011	Al-Qadisiyah		
2011–2012	Al-Faisaly		
2012–2013	Shabab Al-Ordon		
2014–2015	Al-Faisaly		
2015–2016	Sahab		
2016–2018	Al-Jazeera		

International career
2006–2008	Jordan U-23		(1)
2007–2014	Jordan	13	(1)
- * Club domestic league appearances and goals

Mohannad Othman Al-Maharmeh (Arabic: مهند عثمان المحارمة; born December 30, 1986) is a retired Jordanian footballer.

Mohannad is married and has a son named Othman.

== Honors and Participation in International Tournaments ==
=== In Asian Games ===
- 2006 Asian Games

=== In Pan Arab Games ===
- 2011 Pan Arab Games

=== In WAFF Championships ===
- 2008 WAFF Championship

== International goals ==
=== With U-23 Team ===
#	Date	Venue	Opponent	Score	Result	Competition
1	November 24, 2006	Al-Wakrah	Macau	13-0	Win	Football at the 2006 Asian Games

=== With Senior Team ===
#	Date	Venue	Opponent	Score	Result	Competition
1	September 7, 2007	Muharraq	Bahrain	3-1	Win	Friendly
