= 2016 Saudi Crown Prince Cup final =

- Event: 2015–16 Saudi Crown Prince Cup
Al-Hilal	Al-Ahli
2	1
- Date: 19 February 2016
- Venue: King Fahd International Stadium, Riyadh
- Referee: Marai Al-Awaji
- Weather: Partly cloudy 20 °C (68 °F); 18% humidity

The 2016 Saudi Crown Prince Cup final was the 41st final of the Crown Prince Cup. It took place on 19 February 2016 at the King Fahd International Stadium in Riyadh, Saudi Arabia and was contested between Al-Ahli and Al-Hilal. It was Al-Ahli's 13th Crown Prince Cup final and Al-Hilal's 16th final. This was the fifth meeting between these two clubs in the final. Al-Ahli won once in 2015 while Al-Hilal won three times in 2003, 2006, and 2010.

Al-Hilal won the match 2–1 and secured their record-extending 13th Crown Prince Cup title.

== Teams ==
Team	Previous finals appearances (bold indicates winners)
Al-Hilal	15 (**1964**, **1995**, 1999, **2000**, **2003**, **2005**, **2006**, **2008**, **2009**, **2010**, **2011**, **2012**, **2013**, 2014, 2015)
Al-Ahli	12 (**1957**, 1958, **1970**, 1974, **1998**, **2002**, 2003, 2004, 2006, **2007**, 2010, **2015**)

== Venue ==
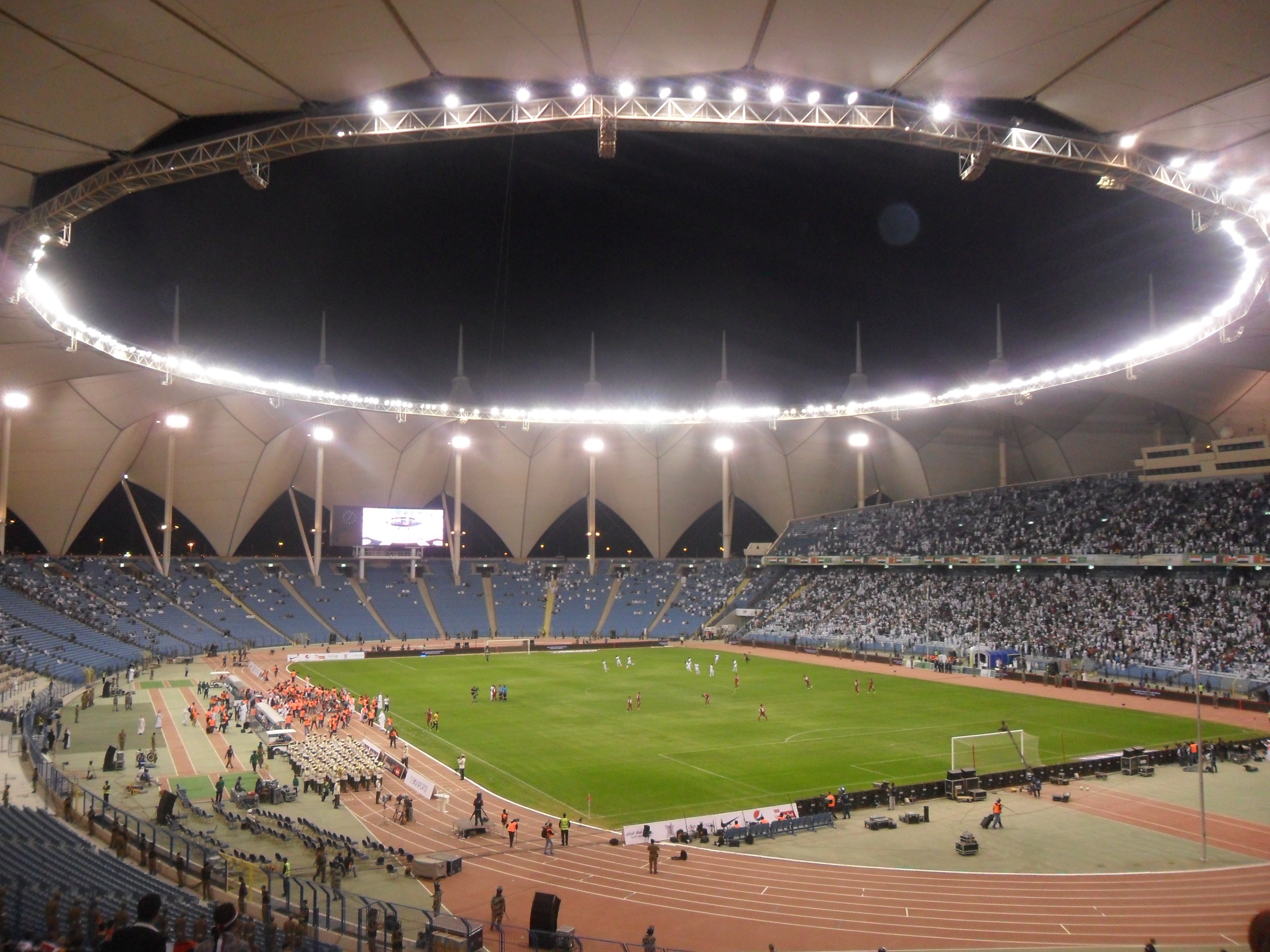
The King Fahd International Stadium in Riyadh hosted the final

On 27 January 2015, the King Fahd International Stadium was announced as the host of the final venue. This was the 14th Crown Prince Cup final hosted in the King Fahd International Stadium following those in 1992, 1994, 1998, 2003, 2004, 2005, 2006, 2008, 2009, 2010, 2012, 2013, 2014 and 2015.

The King Fahd International Stadium was built in 1982 and was opened in 1987. The stadium was used as a venue for the 1992, 1995, and the 1997 editions of the FIFA Confederations Cup. Its current capacity is 68,752 and it is used by the Saudi Arabia national football team, Al-Nassr, Al-Shabab, and major domestic matches.

== Background ==
Al-Hilal reached a record 16th final after a 4–0 win against city rivals Al-Shabab. This was Al-Hilal's ninth final in a row. Previously, they won finals in 1964, 1995, 2000, 2003, 2005, 2006, 2008, 2009, 2010, 2011, 2012, and 2013, and lost in 1999, 2014 and 2015.

Al-Ahli reached their 13th final, after a 1–0 win against derby rivals Al-Ittihad. They reached their second consecutive final. They won last season's final after defeating Al-Hilal 2–1. Previously, they won finals in 1957, 1970, 1998, 2002, 2007 and 2015, and lost in 1958, 1974, 2003, 2004, 2006 and 2010.

This was the fifth meeting between these two sides in the Crown Prince Cup final. Al-Ahli won once in 2015 while Al-Hilal won three times in 2003, 2006 and 2010. This was the 12th meeting between these two sides in the Crown Prince Cup; Al-Hilal won 5 times, Al-Ahli won 3 times and the two teams drew three times. The two teams played each other once in the season prior to the final. The match ended in a 2–1 win for Al-Ahli.

== Road to the final ==
Al-Hilal		Round	Al-Ahli
Opponent	Result		Opponent	Result
Bye		Preliminary round	Bye
Al-Taawoun	2–1 (A)	Round of 16	Hajer	4–2 (A)
Al-Qadisiyah	4–1 (H)	Quarter-finals	Al-Ettifaq	1–0 (H)
Al-Shabab	4–0 (H)	Semi-finals	Al-Ittihad	1–0 (A)

Key: (H) = Home; (A) = Away

== Match ==
=== Details ===
19 February 2016
20:30

Al-Hilal	2–1	Al-Ahli
Al-Shamrani 4'; Al-Abed 33'	Report	Al-Jassim 90'

King Fahd International Stadium, Riyadh
Referee: Marai Al-Awaji

**Al-Hilal**	**Al-Ahli**

GK	1	(Saudi Arabia) Khalid Sharahili	(yellow card) 90+2'
RB	12	(Saudi Arabia) Yasser Al-Shahrani
CB	23	(South Korea) Kwak Tae-Hwi
CB	70	(Saudi Arabia) Mohammed Jahfali
LB	4	(Saudi Arabia) Abdullah Al-Zori
DM	7	(Saudi Arabia) Salman Al-Faraj (c)
DM	8	(Saudi Arabia) Abdullah Otayf		(substituted off) 87'
RW	29	(Saudi Arabia) Salem Al-Dawsari	(yellow card) 79'
AM	3	(Brazil) Carlos Eduardo
LW	24	(Saudi Arabia) Nawaf Al-Abed		(substituted off) 73'
CF	15	(Saudi Arabia) Nasser Al-Shamrani		(substituted off) 80'
Substitutes:
GK	22	(Saudi Arabia) Fahad Al-Thunayan
DF	2	(Saudi Arabia) Mohammed Al-Breik
DF	5	(Saudi Arabia) Ahmed Sharahili		(substituted on) 73'
DF	25	(Saudi Arabia) Faisel Darwish		(substituted on) 87'
MF	10	(Saudi Arabia) Mohammad Al-Shalhoub
MF	14	(Saudi Arabia) Saud Kariri		(substituted on) 80'
FW	20	(Saudi Arabia) Yasser Al-Qahtani
Manager:
(Greece) Georgios Donis

GK	1	(Saudi Arabia) Yasser Al-Mosailem
RB	2	(Saudi Arabia) Ali Al-Zubaidi		(substituted off) 66'
CB	3	(Saudi Arabia) Osama Hawsawi
CB	25	(Saudi Arabia) Motaz Hawsawi	(yellow card) 82'
LB	31	(Saudi Arabia) Mansoor Al-Harbi	(yellow card) 45+1'	(substituted off) 66'
DM	4	(Saudi Arabia) Waleed Bakshween		(substituted off) 46'
CM	8	(Saudi Arabia) Taisir Al-Jassim (c)	(yellow card) 34'
CM	70	(Brazil) Marquinho
RW	10	(Greece) Giannis Fetfatzidis
LW	24	(Saudi Arabia) Salman Al-Moasher
CF	9	(Syria) Omar Al Somah
Substitutes:
GK	66	(Saudi Arabia) Basem Atallah
DF	26	(Saudi Arabia) Mohammed Aman		(substituted on) 66'
DF	99	(Saudi Arabia) Kamel Al-Mousa
MF	5	(Saudi Arabia) Fahad Hamad
MF	11	(Saudi Arabia) Housain Al-Mogahwi
FW	14	(Saudi Arabia) Muhannad Assiri		(substituted on) 66'
FW	20	(Saudi Arabia) Islam Seraj		(substituted on) 46'
Manager:
(Switzerland) Christian Gross

Assistant referees:
Mohammed Al-Abkari
Hisham Al-Refai
Fourth official:
Mohammed Al-Hoaish

**Match rules**

- 90 minutes.
- 30 minutes of extra-time if necessary.
- Penalty shoot-out if scores still level.
- Seven named substitutes.
- Maximum of three substitutions.

==== Statistics ====
Overall
Statistic	Al-Hilal	Al-Ahli
Goals scored	2	1
Total shots	11	9
Shots on target	4	5
Blocked shots	4	2
Ball possession	45%	55%
Corner kicks	3	6
Fouls committed	13	14
Offsides	2	0
Yellow cards	2	3
Red cards	0	0

== See also ==
- 2015–16 Saudi Crown Prince Cup
- 2015–16 Saudi Professional League
- 2016 King Cup
