= 2015 Saudi Crown Prince Cup final =

- Event: 2014–15 Saudi Crown Prince Cup
Al-Ahli	Al-Hilal
2	1
- Date: 13 February 2015
- Venue: King Fahd International Stadium, Riyadh
- Referee: Turki Al-Khudhayr
- Attendance: 50,437
- Weather: Partly cloudy 19 °C (66 °F); 30% humidity

The 2015 Saudi Crown Prince Cup final was the 40th final of the Crown Prince Cup. It took place on 13 February 2015 at the King Fahd International Stadium in Riyadh, Saudi Arabia and was contested between Al-Ahli and Al-Hilal. It was Al-Ahli's 12th Crown Prince Cup final and Al-Hilal's 15th final. This was the fourth meeting between these two clubs in the final Al-Hilal won all previous meetings.

Al-Ahli won the match 2–1 and secured their sixth title and first since 2007.

== Teams ==
Team	Previous finals appearances (bold indicates winners)
Al-Hilal	14 (**1964**, **1995**, 1999, **2000**, **2003**, **2005**, **2006**, **2008**, **2009**, **2010**, **2011**, **2012**, **2013**, 2014)
Al-Ahli	11 (**1957**, 1958, **1970**, 1974, **1998**, **2002**, 2003, 2004, 2006, **2007**, 2010)

== Venue ==
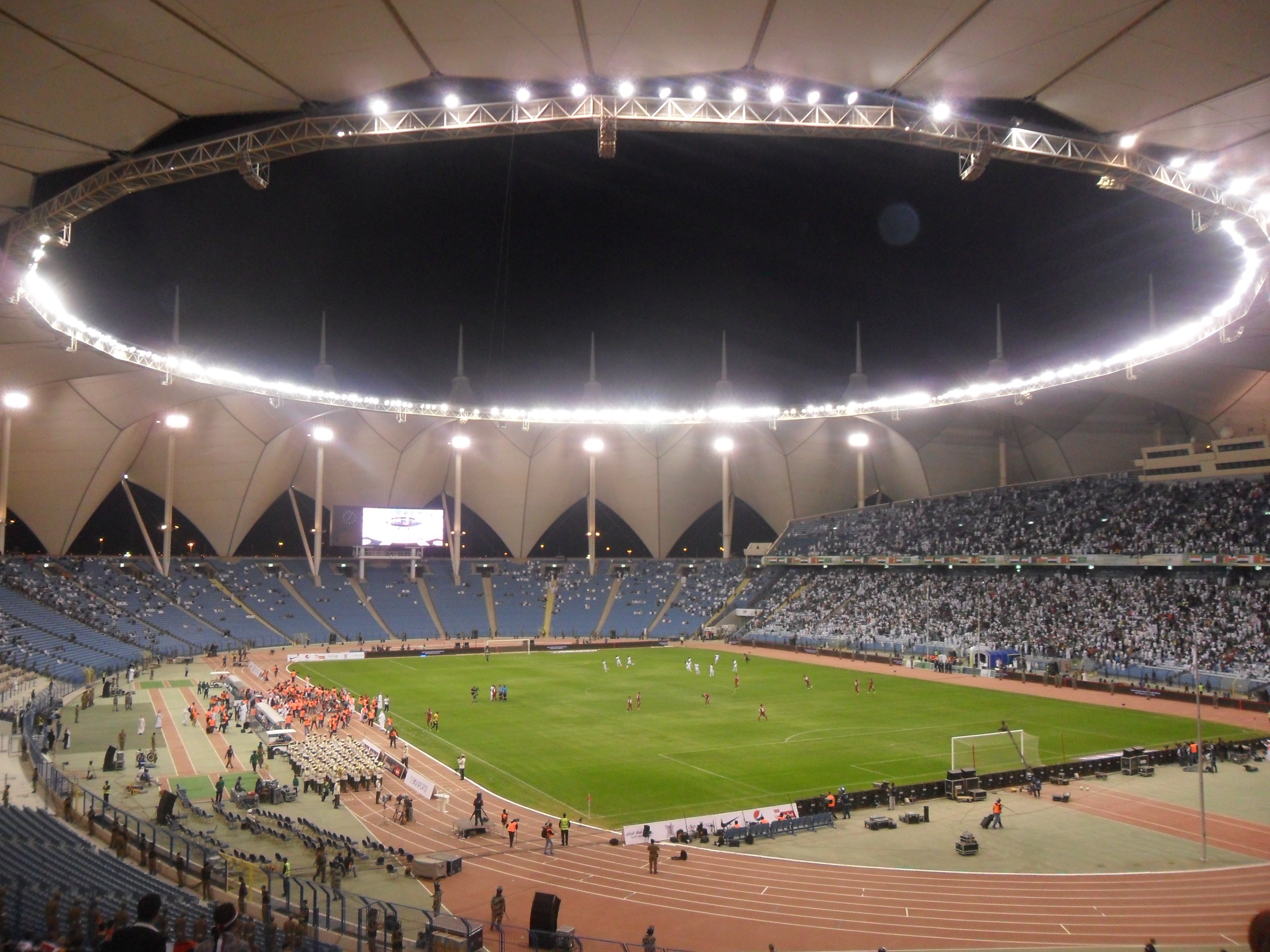
The King Fahd International Stadium in Riyadh hosted the final

On 27 January 2015, the King Fahd International Stadium was announced as the host of the final venue. This was the 14th Crown Prince Cup final hosted in the King Fahd International Stadium following those in 1992, 1994, 1998, 2003, 2004, 2005, 2006, 2008, 2009, 2010, 2012, 2013 and 2014.

The King Fahd International Stadium was built in 1982 and was opened in 1987. The stadium was used as a venue for the 1992, 1995, and the 1997 editions of the FIFA Confederations Cup. Its current capacity is 68,752 and it is used by the Saudi Arabia national football team, Al-Nassr, Al-Shabab, and major domestic matches.

== Background ==
Al-Hilal reached a record 15th final after a 3–0 win against Al-Khaleej. This was Al-Hilal's eighth final in a row. Previously, they won finals in 1964, 1995, 2000, 2003, 2005, 2006, 2008, 2009, 2010, 2011, 2012, and 2013, and lost in 1999 and 2014.

Al-Ahli reached their 12th final, after a 2–1 win against title holders Al-Nassr. They reached their first final since 2010. They finished as runners-up after losing to Al-Hilal in that year's final. Previously, they won finals in 1957, 1970, 1998, 2002, and 2007, and lost in 1958, 1974, 2003, 2004, 2006 and 2010.

This was the fourth meeting between these two sides in the Crown Prince Cup final. Al-Hilal won all three times in 2003, 2006 and 2010. This was the 11th meeting between these two sides in the Crown Prince Cup; Al-Hilal won 5 times, Al-Ahli won 2 times and the two teams drew three times. The two teams played each other once in the season prior to the final. The match ended in a 0–0 draw.

== Road to the final ==
Al-Ahli		Round	Al-Hilal
Opponent	Result		Opponent	Result
Al-Hazem	1–0 (H)	Preliminary round	Bye
Hajer	2–0 (H)	Round of 16	Al-Ittihad	3–2 (A)
Al-Ettifaq	2–1 (A)	Quarter-finals	Hetten	3–0 (H)
Al-Nassr	2–1 (H)	Semi-finals	Al-Khaleej	3–0 (H)

Key: (H) = Home; (A) = Away

== Match ==
=== Details ===
13 February 2015
20:30

Al-Ahli	2–1	Al-Hilal
Al Somah 59'; M. Hawsawi 68'	Report	Samaras 76'

King Fahd International Stadium, Riyadh
Attendance: 50,437
Referee: Turki Al-Khudhayr

**Al-Ahli**	**Al-Hilal**

GK	22	(Saudi Arabia) Abdullah Al-Mayouf	(red card) 62'
RB	21	(Saudi Arabia) Ageel Balghaith
CB	3	(Saudi Arabia) Osama Hawsawi
CB	25	(Saudi Arabia) Motaz Hawsawi
LB	13	(Egypt) Mohamed Abdel Shafy
DM	4	(Saudi Arabia) Waleed Bakshween
DM	8	(Saudi Arabia) Taisir Al-Jassim (c)
RW	47	(Saudi Arabia) Mustafa Bassas		(substituted off) 65'
AM	11	(Saudi Arabia) Housain Al-Mogahwi	(yellow card) 85'
LW	16	(Brazil) Osvaldo		(substituted off) 79'
CF	41	(Saudi Arabia) Muhannad Assiri		(substituted off) 58'
Substitutes:
GK	1	(Saudi Arabia) Yasser Al-Mosailem		(substituted in) 65'
DF	23	(Saudi Arabia) Kamel Al-Mousa
DF	26	(Saudi Arabia) Mohammed Aman		(substituted in) 79'
DF	77	(Saudi Arabia) Amiri Kurdi
MF	7	(Saudi Arabia) Ahmed Al-Aoufi
MF	29	(Saudi Arabia) Zakaria Sami
FW	9	(Syria) Omar Al Somah		(substituted in) 58'
Manager:
(Switzerland) Christian Gross

GK	28	(Saudi Arabia) Abdullah Al-Sudairy
RB	12	(Saudi Arabia) Yasser Al-Shahrani
CB	23	(South Korea) Kwak Tae-Hwi
CB	26	(Brazil) Digão
LB	49	(Saudi Arabia) Abdullah Al-Shamekh	(yellow card) 54'	(substituted off) 70'
DM	13	(Saudi Arabia) Salman Al-Faraj
DM	14	(Saudi Arabia) Saud Kariri (c)
RW	29	(Saudi Arabia) Salem Al-Dawsari
AM	7	(Brazil) Thiago Neves
LW	24	(Saudi Arabia) Nawaf Al-Abed		(substituted off) 70'
CF	15	(Saudi Arabia) Nasser Al-Shamrani
Substitutes:
GK	22	(Saudi Arabia) Fahad Al-Thunayan
DF	17	(Saudi Arabia) Abdullah Al-Hafith
MF	10	(Saudi Arabia) Mohammad Al-Shalhoub		(substituted in) 70' (substituted off) 81'
MF	11	(Saudi Arabia) Abdullaziz Al-Dawsari		(substituted in) 81'
MF	18	(Saudi Arabia) Abdullah Otayf
FW	16	(Saudi Arabia) Yousef Al-Salem
FW	77	(Greece) Georgios Samaras		(substituted in) 70'
Manager:
(Romania) Laurențiu Reghecampf

Assistant referees:
Abdulaziz Al-Asmari
Badr Al-Shahrani
Fourth official:
Marai Al Awaji

**Match rules**

- 90 minutes.
- 30 minutes of extra-time if necessary.
- Penalty shoot-out if scores still level.
- Seven named substitutes.
- Maximum of three substitutions.

==== Statistics ====
Overall
Statistic	Al-Ahli	Al-Hilal
Goals scored	2	1
Total shots	11	12
Shots on target	3	3
Blocked shots	2	1
Ball possession	36%	64%
Corner kicks	2	2
Fouls committed	13	23
Offsides	0	2
Yellow cards	1	1
Red cards	1	0

== See also ==
- 2014–15 Saudi Crown Prince Cup
- 2014–15 Saudi Professional League
- 2015 King Cup of Champions
