= 2014 Saudi Crown Prince Cup final =

- Event: 2013–14 Saudi Crown Prince Cup
Al-Nassr	Al-Hilal
2	1
- Date: 1 February 2014
- Venue: King Fahd International Stadium, Riyadh
- Referee: Damir Skomina (Slovenia)
- Attendance: 62,124
- Weather: Partly cloudy 17.2 °C (63.0 °F); 59% humidity

The 2014 Saudi Crown Prince Cup final was the 39th final of the Crown Prince Cup. It took place on 1 February 2014 at the King Fahd International Stadium in Riyadh, Saudi Arabia and was contested between Al-Nassr and Al-Hilal. It was Al-Nassr's sixth Crown Prince Cup final and Al-Hilal's 14th final. This was the second meeting between these two clubs in the final and was a repeat of last year's final.

Al-Nassr won the match 2–1 and secured their third title and first since 1974. In addition, this was the first time since 2007 that a team other than Al-Hilal won the title.

== Teams ==
Team	Previous finals appearances (bold indicates winners)
Al-Hilal	13 (**1964**, **1995**, 1999, **2000**, **2003**, **2005**, **2006**, **2008**, **2009**, **2010**, **2011**, **2012**, **2013**)
Al-Nassr	5 (**1973**, **1974**, 1991, 1996, 2013)

== Venue ==
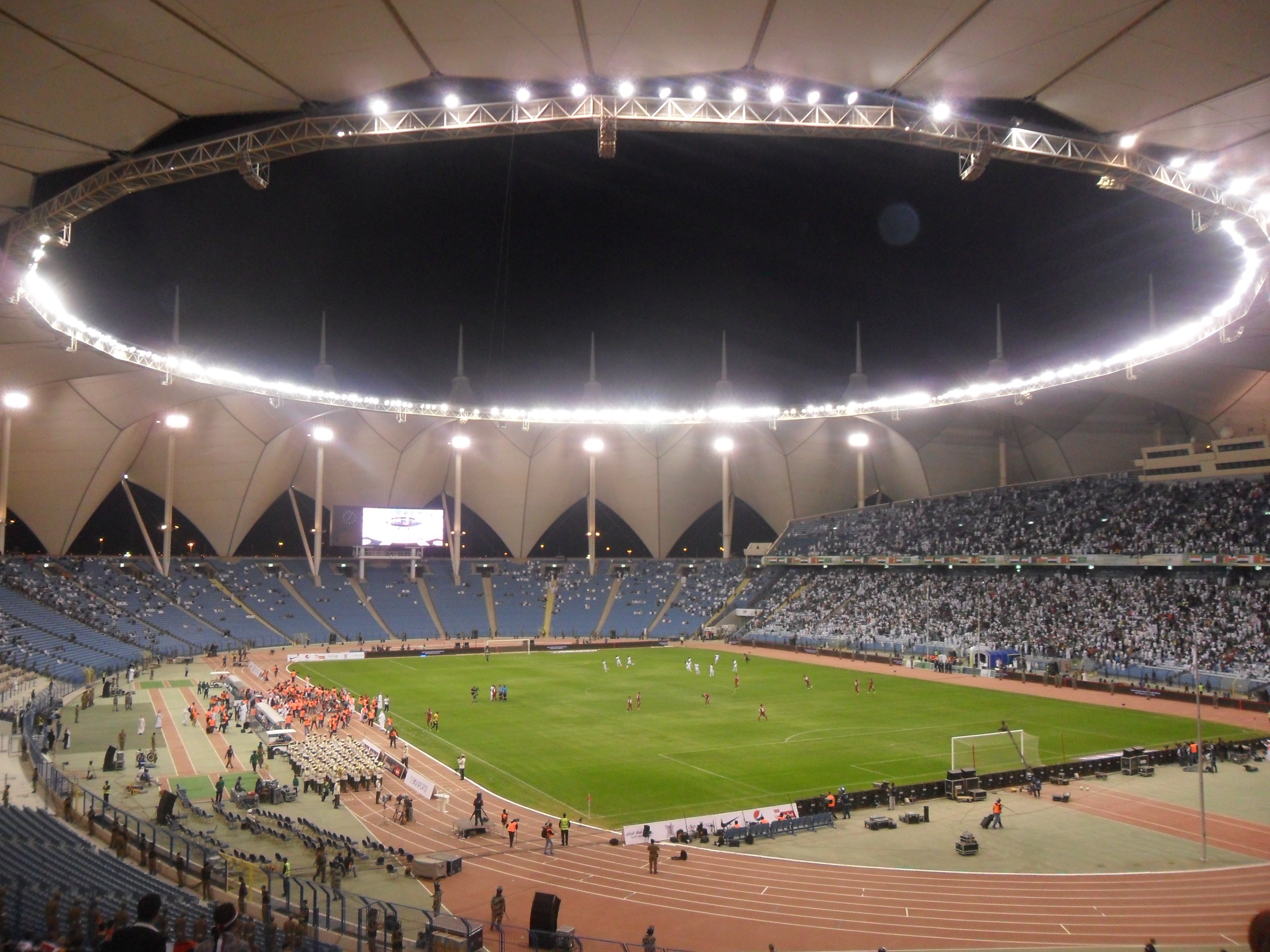
The King Fahd International Stadium in Riyadh hosted the final

The King Fahd International Stadium was announced as the host of the final venue. This was the 13th Crown Prince Cup final hosted in the King Fahd International Stadium following those in 1992, 1994, 1998, 2003, 2004, 2005, 2006, 2008, 2009, 2010, 2012 and 2013.

The King Fahd International Stadium was built in 1982 and was opened in 1987. The stadium was used as a venue for the 1992, 1995, and the 1997 editions of the FIFA Confederations Cup. Its current capacity is 68,752 and it is used by the Saudi Arabia national football team, Al-Nassr, Al-Shabab, and major domestic matches.

== Background ==
Al-Hilal reached a record 14th final after a 2–0 away win to Al-Fateh. This was Al-Hilal's seventh final in a row. Previously, they won finals in 1964, 1995, 2000, 2003, 2005, 2006, 2008, 2009, 2010, 2011, 2012, and 2013, and lost in 1999. Al-Hilal entered the match as six-time defending champions.

Al-Nassr reached their sixth final, after a 1–0 win against city rivals Al-Shabab. They reached their second consecutive final having lost last year's final against Al-Hilal.

This was the second meeting between these two sides in the Crown Prince Cup final after last year's final. Al-Hilal won last year's final 4–2 on a penalty shoot-out after a 1–1 draw at the end of extra time. This was the tenth meeting between these two sides in the Crown Prince Cup; Al-Hilal won 7 times, Al-Nassr won once and the two teams drew once in last year's final. The two teams played each other once in the season prior to the final. Al-Nassr won the match 2–1 thanks to a brace from Mohammed Al Sahlawi.

== Road to the final ==
Al-Nassr		Round	Al-Hilal
Opponent	Result		Opponent	Result
Najran	3–0 (H)	Round of 16	Al-Shoulla	4–1 (H)
Al-Khaleej	3–1 (A)	Quarter-finals	Al-Raed	1–0 (A)
Al-Shabab	1–0 (H) (a.e.t.)	Semi-finals	Al-Fateh	2–0 (A)

Key: (H) = Home; (A) = Away

== Match ==
=== Details ===
1 February 2014
20:15

Al-Nassr	2–1	Al-Hilal
Al-Deayea 24' (o.g.); Al-Sahlawi 59' (pen.)	Report	Al-Shamrani 2'

King Fahd International Stadium, Riyadh
Attendance: 62,124
Referee: Damir Skomina (Slovenia)

**Al-Nassr**	**Al-Hilal**

GK	22	(Saudi Arabia) Abdullah Al-Enezi
RB	12	(Saudi Arabia) Khalid Al-Ghamdi
CB	2	(Bahrain) Mohamed Husain
CB	4	(Saudi Arabia) Omar Hawsawi
LB	24	(Saudi Arabia) Hussein Abdulghani (c)
CM	14	(Saudi Arabia) Ibrahim Ghaleb
CM	26	(Saudi Arabia) Shaye Sharahili
CM	27	(Saudi Arabia) Awadh Khamis		(substituted off) 77'
AM	18	(Saudi Arabia) Mohammed Noor		(substituted off) 65'
CF	10	(Saudi Arabia) Mohammad Al-Sahlawi	(yellow card) 90+1'
CF	17	(Brazil) Élton		(substituted off) 90+2'
Substitutes:
GK	1	(Saudi Arabia) Abdullah Al-Shammeri
DF	13	(Saudi Arabia) Mohamed Al-Bishi
MF	7	(Saudi Arabia) Abdulrahim Jaizawi	(yellow card) 90+3'	(substituted in) 77'
MF	8	(Saudi Arabia) Yahya Al-Shehri		(substituted in) 65'
MF	85	(Algeria) Mourad Delhoum
FW	77	(Oman) Amad Al-Hosni
FW	99	(Saudi Arabia) Hassan Al-Raheb		(substituted in) 90+2'
Manager:
(Uruguay) José Carreño

GK	22	(Saudi Arabia) Hussain Shae'an
RB	12	(Saudi Arabia) Yasser Al-Shahrani
CB	26	(Brazil) Digão
CB	33	(Saudi Arabia) Sultan Al-Deayea
LB	4	(Saudi Arabia) Abdullah Al-Zori (c)		(substituted off) 83'
DM	14	(Ecuador) Segundo Castillo
DM	27	(Saudi Arabia) Saud Kariri		(substituted off) 69'
RM	29	(Saudi Arabia) Salem Al-Dawsari	(yellow card) 84'
AM	7	(Brazil) Thiago Neves
LM	24	(Saudi Arabia) Nawaf Al-Abed		(substituted off) 59'
CF	15	(Saudi Arabia) Nasser Al-Shamrani
Substitutes:
GK	30	(Saudi Arabia) Fayz Al-Sabiay
DF	2	(Saudi Arabia) Sultan Al-Bishi
MF	10	(Saudi Arabia) Mohammad Al-Shalhoub
MF	11	(Saudi Arabia) Abdullaziz Al-Dawsari		(substituted in) 59'
MF	13	(Saudi Arabia) Salman Al-Faraj		(substituted in) 83'
FW	16	(Saudi Arabia) Yousef Al-Salem
FW	20	(Saudi Arabia) Yasser Al-Qahtani		(substituted in) 69'
Manager:
(Saudi Arabia) Sami Al-Jaber

Assistant referees:
Bojan Ul (Slovenia)
Jure Praprotnik (Slovenia)
Fourth official:
Marai Al Awaji

**Match rules**

- 90 minutes.
- 30 minutes of extra-time if necessary.
- Penalty shoot-out if scores still level.
- Seven named substitutes.
- Maximum of three substitutions.

== See also ==
- 2013–14 Saudi Crown Prince Cup
- 2013–14 Saudi Professional League
- 2014 King Cup of Champions
