= 2013 Saudi Crown Prince Cup final =

- Event: 2012–13 Saudi Crown Prince Cup
Al-Hilal	Al-Nassr
1	1
- After extra time Al-Hilal won 4–2 on penalties
- Date: 22 February 2013
- Venue: King Fahd International Stadium, Riyadh
- Referee: Gianluca Rocchi (Italy)
- Attendance: 58,430
- Weather: Clear; 27 °C (81 °F); 18% humidity

The 2013 Saudi Crown Prince Cup final was the 38th final of the Crown Prince Cup. It took place on 22 February 2013 at the King Fahd International Stadium in Riyadh, Saudi Arabia and was contested between Al-Hilal and Al-Nassr. It was Al-Hilal's 13th Crown Prince Cup final and Al-Nassr's fifth final. This was the first meeting between these two clubs in the final. In addition, this was Al-Nassr's first final since 1996.

Al-Hilal won 4–2 on a penalty shoot-out after a 1–1 draw at the end of extra time, securing a record-extending 12th title in the competition and their sixth one in a row.

== Teams ==
Team	Previous finals appearances (bold indicates winners)
Al-Hilal	12 (**1964**, **1995**, 1999, **2000**, **2003**, **2005**, **2006**, **2008**, **2009**, **2010**, **2011**, **2012**)
Al-Nassr	4 (**1973**, **1974**, 1991, 1996)

== Venue ==
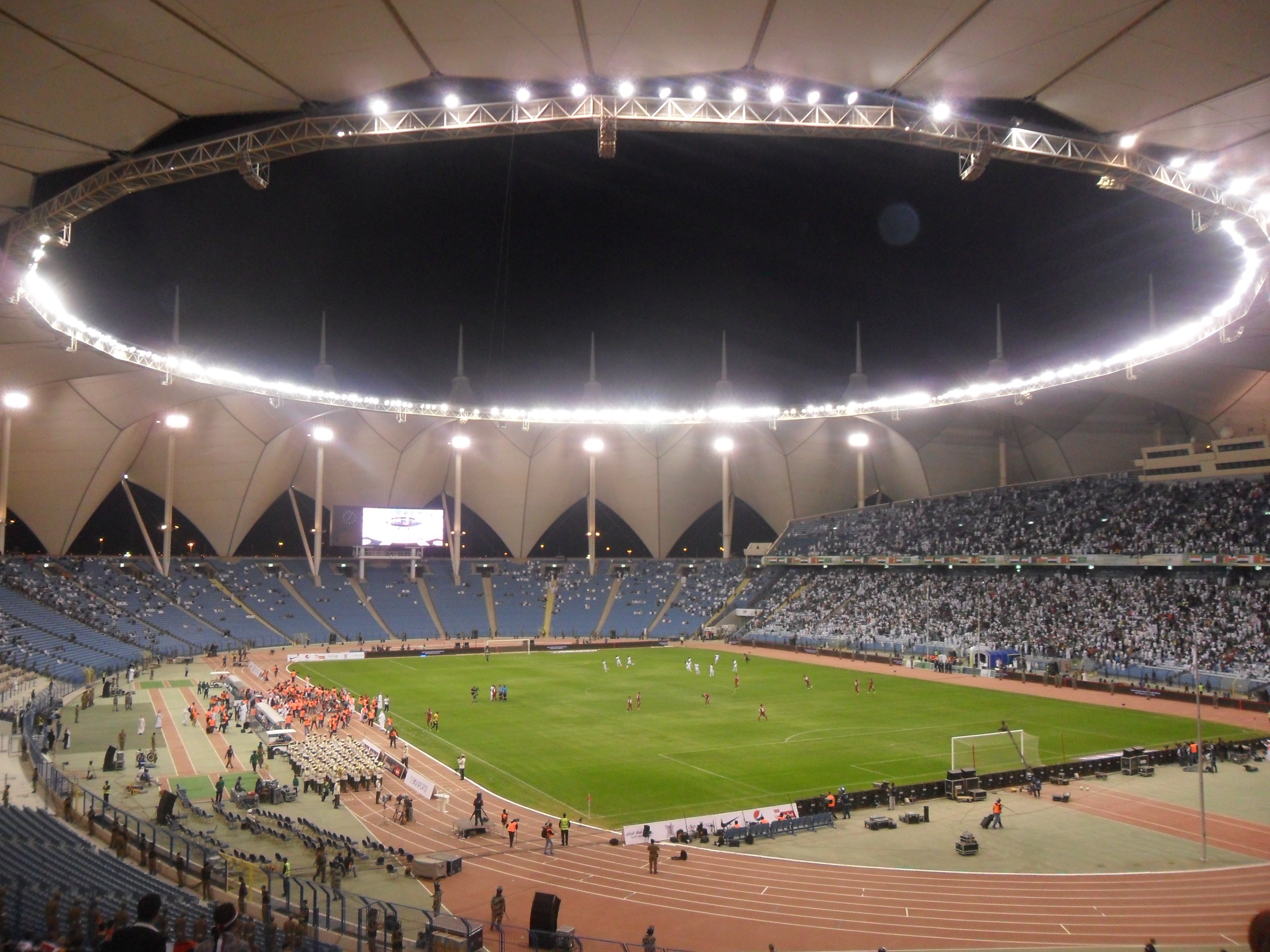
The King Fahd International Stadium in Riyadh hosted the final

The King Fahd International Stadium was announced as the host of the final venue. This was the twelfth Crown Prince Cup final hosted in the King Fahd International Stadium following those in 1992, 1994, 1998, 2003, 2004, 2005, 2006, 2008, 2009, 2010, and 2012.

The King Fahd International Stadium was built in 1982 and was opened in 1987. The stadium was used as a venue for the 1992, 1995, and the 1997 editions of the FIFA Confederations Cup. Its current capacity is 68,752 and it is used by the Saudi Arabia national football team, Al-Nassr, Al-Shabab, and major domestic matches.

== Background ==
Al-Hilal reached a record 13th final after a 1–0 away win to Al-Faisaly. This was Al-Hilal's sixth final in a row. Previously, they won finals in 1964, 1995, 2000, 2003, 2005, 2006, 2008, 2009, 2010, 2011, and 2012, and lost in 1999.

Al-Nassr reached their fifth final, after a 2–0 away win to Al-Raed. They reached their first final since 1996 when they finished as runners-up after losing to Al-Shabab.

This was the first meeting between these two sides in the Crown Prince Cup final. This was the ninth meeting between these two sides in the Crown Prince Cup; Al-Hilal won 7 times while Al-Nassr won once in 1973. The two teams played each other twice in the season prior to the final with both teams winning once.

== Road to the final ==
Al-Hilal		Round	Al-Nassr
Opponent	Result		Opponent	Result
Najran	2–1 (A)	Round of 16	Al-Taawoun	4–2 (A)
Al-Fateh	2–0 (A)	Quarter-finals	Al-Ahli	2–1 (A)
Al-Faisaly	1–0 (A)	Semi-finals	Al-Raed	2–0 (A)

Key: (H) = Home; (A) = Away

== Match ==
=== Details ===
22 February 2013
20:35

Al-Hilal	1–1 (a.e.t.)	Al-Nassr
Al-Shalhoub 118' (pen.)	Report	Al-Raheb 120'
Penalties
Al-Qahtani (penalty scored); Ozéia (penalty scored); Massad (penalty missed); Al-Shalhoub (penalty scored); Al-Abed (penalty scored)	4–2	(penalty missed) Abd Rabo; (penalty scored) Ghaleb; (penalty missed) Charisteas; (penalty scored) Abdulghani

King Fahd International Stadium, Riyadh
Attendance: 58,430
Referee: Gianluca Rocchi (Italy)

**Al-Hilal**	**Al-Nassr**

GK	28	(Saudi Arabia) Abdullah Al-Sudairy
RB	2	(Saudi Arabia) Sultan Al-Bishi	(yellow card) 43'	(substituted off) 84'
CB	25	(Saudi Arabia) Majed Al-Marshedi
CB	33	(Brazil) Ozéia	(yellow card) 14'
LB	4	(Saudi Arabia) Abdullah Al-Zori		(substituted off) 99'
RM	12	(Saudi Arabia) Yasser Al-Shahrani
CM	6	(Saudi Arabia) Mohammed Al-Qarni	(yellow card) 36'
CM	13	(Saudi Arabia) Salman Al-Faraj
LM	10	(Saudi Arabia) Mohammad Al-Shalhoub	(yellow card) 34'
CF	9	(Brazil) Wesley		(substituted off) 72'
CF	20	(Saudi Arabia) Yasser Al-Qahtani (c)
Substitutes:
GK	22	(Saudi Arabia) Fahad Al-Shammari
DF	34	(Saudi Arabia) Mohammad Massad		(substituted in) 99'
MF	8	(Colombia) Gustavo Bolívar
MF	11	(Saudi Arabia) Abdullaziz Al-Dawsari
MF	24	(Saudi Arabia) Nawaf Al-Abed		(substituted in) 84'
MF	29	(Saudi Arabia) Salem Al-Dawsari		(substituted in) 72'
FW	7	(South Korea) Yoo Byung-soo
Manager:
(Croatia) Zlatko Dalić

GK	22	(Saudi Arabia) Abdullah Al-Enezi
RB	26	(Saudi Arabia) Shaye Sharahili
CB	2	(Bahrain) Mohamed Husain
CB	4	(Saudi Arabia) Omar Hawsawi
LB	24	(Saudi Arabia) Hussein Abdulghani (c)
CM	8	(Egypt) Hosny Abd Rabo	(yellow card) 70'
CM	14	(Saudi Arabia) Ibrahim Ghaleb	(yellow card) 74'
CM	37	(Saudi Arabia) Ayman Ftayni		(substituted off) 46'
RF	25	(Saudi Arabia) Khaled Al-Zylaeei	(yellow card) 109'
CF	10	(Saudi Arabia) Mohammad Al-Sahlawi		(substituted off) 94'
LF	16	(Brazil) Rafael Bastos
Substitutes:
GK	33	(Saudi Arabia) Mutaeb Assiri
DF	12	(Saudi Arabia) Khalid Al-Ghamdi
DF	13	(Saudi Arabia) Mohamed Al-Bishi
DF	20	(Saudi Arabia) Ibrahim Al-Zubaidi
MF	15	(Saudi Arabia) Abdoh Otaif	(yellow card) 96'	(substituted in) 46' (substituted off) 103'
FW	90	(Greece) Angelos Charisteas		(substituted in) 94'
FW	99	(Saudi Arabia) Hassan Al-Raheb		(substituted in) 103'
Manager:
(Uruguay) José Carreño

Assistant referees:
Riccardo Di Fiore (Italy)
Alessandro Giallatini (Italy)
Fourth official:
Abdulrahman Al-Amri

**Match rules**

- 90 minutes.
- 30 minutes of extra-time if necessary.
- Penalty shoot-out if scores still level.
- Seven named substitutes.
- Maximum of three substitutions.

== See also ==
- 2012–13 Saudi Crown Prince Cup
- 2012–13 Saudi Professional League
- 2013 King Cup of Champions
