= 2012 Saudi Crown Prince Cup final =

- Event: 2011–12 Saudi Crown Prince Cup
Al-Hilal	Al-Ettifaq
2	1
- Date: 10 February 2012
- Venue: King Fahd International Stadium, Riyadh
- Referee: Nicola Rizzoli (Italy)
- Attendance: 40,000

The 2012 Saudi Crown Prince Cup final was the 37th final of the Crown Prince Cup, a football tournament. It took place on 10 February 2012 at the King Fahd International Stadium in Riyadh, Saudi Arabia and was contested between Al-Hilal and Al-Ettifaq. It was Al-Hilal's 12th Crown Prince Cup final and Al-Ettifaq's fifth final. This was the second meeting between these two clubs in the final after 2008. It was Al-Ettifaq's first final since 2008 and Al-Hilal's fifth final in a row.

Al-Hilal won the match 2–1 to claim their eleventh Crown Prince Cup title and their fifth one in a row.

== Teams ==
Team	Previous finals appearances (bold indicates winners)
Al-Hilal	11 (**1964**, **1995**, 1999, **2000**, **2003**, **2005**, **2006**, **2008**, **2009**, **2010**, **2011**)
Al-Ettifaq	4 (1963, **1965**, 2001, 2008)

== Venue ==
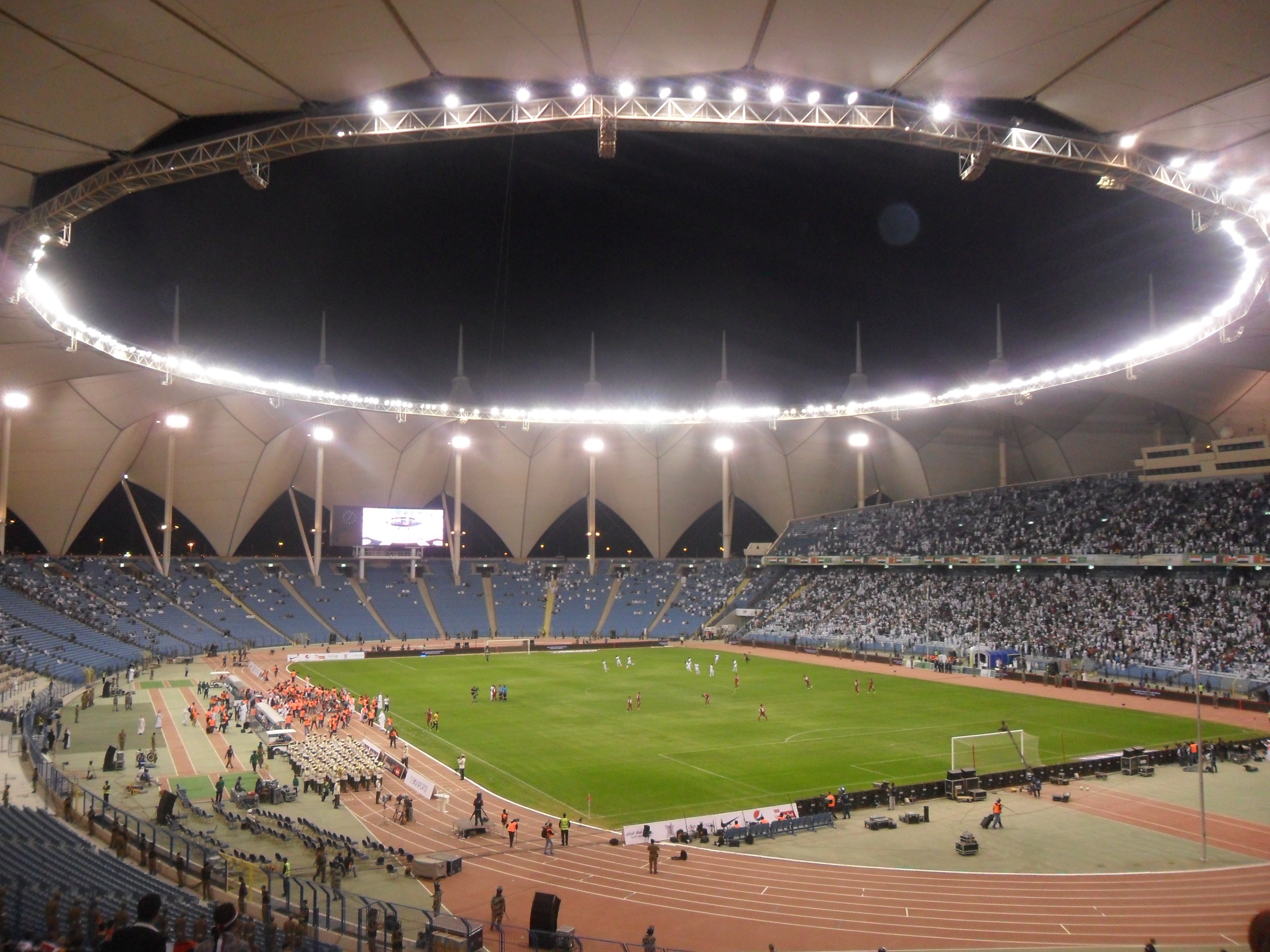
The King Fahd International Stadium in Riyadh hosted the final

The King Fahd International Stadium was announced as the host of the final venue. This was the eleventh Crown Prince Cup final hosted in the King Fahd International Stadium following those in 1992, 1994, 1998, 2003, 2004, 2005, 2006, 2008, 2009 and 2010.

The King Fahd International Stadium was built in 1982 and was opened in 1987. The stadium was used as a venue for the 1992, 1995, and the 1997 editions of the FIFA Confederations Cup. Its current capacity is 68,752 and it is used by the Saudi Arabia national football team, Al-Nassr, Al-Shabab, and major domestic matches.

== Background ==
Al-Hilal reached their twelfth final after a 2–0 win against Al-Ittihad. This was Al-Hilal's fifth final in a row.

Al-Ettifaq reached their fifth final, after a 2–1 away win against Al-Ahli. They reached their first final since 2008 when they finished as runners-up after losing to Al-Hilal.

This was the second meeting between these two sides in the Crown Prince Cup final. Al-Hilal won the previous meeting 2–0 in the 2008 final. The two teams played each other once in the season prior to the final. The match ended in a 2–2 draw.

== Road to the final ==
Al-Hilal		Round	Al-Ettifaq
Opponent	Result		Opponent	Result
Al-Shoulla	6–1 (A)	Round of 16	Al-Ansar	2–0 (H)
Al-Nassr	4–1 (H)	Quarter-finals	Najran	3–0 (H)
Al-Ittihad	2–0 (H)	Semi-finals	Al-Ahli	2–1 (A)

Key: (H) = Home; (A) = Away

== Match ==
=== Details ===
10 February 2012
20:25 AST

Al-Hilal	2–1	Al-Ettifaq
Wilhelmsson 9'; Al-Abed 21'	Report	Al-Shehri 35'

King Fahd International Stadium, Riyadh
Attendance: 40,000
Referee: Nicola Rizzoli (Italy)

**Al-Hilal**	**Al-Ettifaq**

GK	1	(Saudi Arabia) Khalid Sharahili
RB	2	(Saudi Arabia) Sultan Al-Bishi	(yellow card) 45+1'
CB	3	(Saudi Arabia) Osama Hawsawi (c)
CB	25	(Saudi Arabia) Majed Al-Marshedi	(yellow card) 83'
LB	13	(Saudi Arabia) Salman Al-Faraj
DM	21	(Morocco) Adil Hermach	(yellow card) 50'
RM	99	(Sweden) Christian Wilhelmsson		(substituted off) 25'
CM	10	(Saudi Arabia) Mohammad Al-Shalhoub		(substituted off) 79'
CM	24	(Saudi Arabia) Nawaf Al-Abed	(yellow card) 34'
LM	29	(Saudi Arabia) Salem Al-Dawsari
CF	7	(South Korea) Yoo Byung-soo	(red card) 88'
Substitutes:
GK	30	(Saudi Arabia) Hassan Al-Otaibi
DF	4	(Saudi Arabia) Abdullah Al-Zori
DF	23	(Saudi Arabia) Hassan Khairat
MF	6	(Saudi Arabia) Mohammed Al-Qarni		(substituted on) 79'
MF	15	(Saudi Arabia) Ahmed Al-Fraidi		(substituted on) 25'
FW	16	(Saudi Arabia) Essa Al-Mehyani
FW	77	(Saudi Arabia) Saad Al-Harthi
Manager:
(Czech Republic) Ivan Hašek

GK	32	(Saudi Arabia) Fayz Al-Sabiay
RB	70	(Saudi Arabia) Waleed Mahboob
CB	4	(Brazil) Carlos
CB	5	(Saudi Arabia) Sayaf Al-Bishi (c)
LB	66	(Oman) Hassan Mudhafar		(substituted off) 36'
RM	8	(Saudi Arabia) Yahya Al-Shehri
CM	6	(Saudi Arabia) Yahya Otain	(yellow card) 42'
CM	11	(Brazil) Bruno Lazaroni
LM	9	(Saudi Arabia) Hamed Al-Hamed
CF	16	(Saudi Arabia) Yousef Al-Salem
CF	18	(Argentina) Sebastián Tagliabúe		(substituted off) 56'
Substitutes:
GK	1	(Saudi Arabia) Mohammad Khouja
DF	3	(Saudi Arabia) Jamaan Al-Jamaan
DF	14	(Saudi Arabia) Ahmad Akash		(substituted on) 36' (substituted off) 80'
MF	7	(Saudi Arabia) Abdulmutalib Al-Traidi		(substituted on) 80'
MF	20	(Saudi Arabia) Sultan Al-Bargan
FW	10	(Saudi Arabia) Saleh Bashir
FW	99	(Saudi Arabia) Zamil Al-Sulim		(substituted on) 56'
Manager:
(Croatia) Branko Ivanković

Assistant referees:
Giorgio Niccolai (Italy)
Roberto Romagnoli (Italy)
Fourth official:
Marai Al-Awaji

**Match rules**

- 90 minutes.
- 30 minutes of extra-time if necessary.
- Penalty shoot-out if scores still level.
- Seven named substitutes.
- Maximum of three substitutions.

== See also ==
- 2011–12 Saudi Crown Prince Cup
- 2011–12 Saudi Professional League
- 2012 King Cup of Champions
