= 2015–16 Saudi Crown Prince Cup =

2015–16 Crown Prince Cup
Tournament details
- Country: Saudi Arabia
- Dates: 15 August 2015 – 19 February 2016
- Teams: 30

Final positions
- Champions: Al-Hilal (13th title)
- Runners-up: Al-Ahli

Tournament statistics
- Matches played: 29
- Goals scored: 91 (3.14 per match)
- Top goal scorer(s): Saqer Otaif (4 goals)
- All statistics correct as of 19 February 2016.

The 2015–16 Saudi Crown Prince Cup was the 41st season of the Saudi Crown Prince Cup since its establishment in 1957. This season's competition featured a total of 30 teams, 14 teams from the Pro League, and 16 teams from the First Division.

The holders were Al-Ahli who beat Al-Hilal 2–1 in the previous season's final on 13 February 2015.

The 2016 Saudi Crown Prince Cup Final was played between Al-Ahli and Al-Hilal at the King Fahd International Stadium in Riyadh. In a rematch of the previous year's final, Al-Hilal defeated holders Al-Ahli 2–1 in the final to win their record-extending 13th Crown Prince Cup title.

== Participating teams ==
=== Pro League ===
- Al-Ahli (round of 16 direct entrants)
- Al-Faisaly
- Al-Fateh
- Al-Hilal (round of 16 direct entrants)
- Al-Ittihad
- Al-Khaleej
- Al-Nassr
- Al-Qadisiyah
- Al-Raed
- Al-Shabab
- Al-Taawoun
- Al-Wehda
- Hajer
- Najran

=== First Division ===
- Al-Batin
- Al-Diriyah
- Al-Ettifaq
- Al-Fayha
- Al-Hazem
- Al-Jeel
- Al-Mujazzal
- Al-Nahda
- Al-Nojoom
- Al-Orobah
- Al-Riyadh
- Al-Shoalah
- Al-Tai
- Al-Watani
- Damac
- Ohod

== First stage ==
=== Preliminary round ===
The Preliminary round fixtures were played on 15, 16, 17 & 24 August 2015. All times are local, AST (UTC+3).

15 August 2015 6	Al-Fateh (1)	1–1 (a.e.t.) (4–5 p)	Al-Nahda (2)	Al-Hasa
19:00	Bo Shaqra 39'		Al-Malki 29'	Stadium: Prince Abdullah bin Jalawi Stadium; Referee: Khaled Salwi
	Penalties
	Élton (penalty scored); Al-Bladi (penalty scored); Buhimed (penalty scored); Sharahili (penalty missed); Hazzazi (penalty scored); Al-Asmari (penalty missed)		(penalty scored) Al-Aliany; (penalty scored) Al-Dhahi; (penalty scored) Al-Malki; (penalty missed) Al-Nashi; (penalty scored) Al-Rajaa; (penalty scored) Al-Omaisi

15 August 2015 11	Al-Batin (2)	2–3 (a.e.t.)	Al-Khaleej (1)	Hafar al-Batin
19:15	Papa Diop 14'; Mohanna 85'		Al Salem 80'; Hussein 90+4'; Al-Turki 119'	Stadium: Al-Batin Club Stadium; Referee: Ahmed Al-Remeikhany

15 August 2015 13	Damac (2)	0–1	Najran (1)	Abha
19:15			Al-Mehyani 45'	Stadium: Prince Sultan bin Abdul Aziz Stadium; Referee: Majed Al-Shamrani

15 August 2015 14	Al-Ittihad (1)	5–0	Ohod (2)	Makkah
20:45	Sânmărtean 36'; Rivas 41'; Al-Ghamdi 49'; Khrees 63'; Fallatah 80'			Stadium: King Abdul Aziz Stadium; Referee: Abdulrahman Al-Kaabi

16 August 2015 2	Al-Qadisiyah (1)	3–2	Al-Jeel (2)	Khobar
19:00	Hector 54'; Al-Obaid 83'; Abdul-Amir 90+5' (pen.)		Douglas 48' (pen.); Adam 69'	Stadium: Prince Saud bin Jalawi Stadium; Referee: Khaled Al-Sennani

16 August 2015 8	Hajer (1)	2–1	Al-Watani (2)	Al-Hasa
19:00	Mojica 62' (pen.); Al-Saiari 65'		Harzan 82'	Stadium: Prince Abdullah bin Jalawi Stadium; Referee: Sami Al-Jires

16 August 2015 3	Al-Faisaly (1)	2–1	Al-Fayha (2)	Al Majma'ah
19:15	Salem 45'; Onyilo 84'		Al-Khamis 24'	Stadium: King Salman Sport City Stadium; Referee: Haidar Al-Sharidah

16 August 2015 1	Al-Taawoun (1)	3–0	Al-Diriyah (2)	Buraidah
20:45	Fallatah 35'; Machado 44'; Al-Mousa 77'			Stadium: King Abdullah Sport City Stadium; Referee: Khaled Al-Teris

17 August 2015 10	Al-Ettifaq (2)	1–0	Al-Raed (1)	Dammam
19:00	Al-Bishi 60' (o.g.)			Stadium: Prince Mohamed bin Fahd Stadium; Referee: Abdulrahman Al-Shehri

17 August 2015 4	Al-Shoulla (2)	1–0	Al-Nojoom (2)	Al-Kharj
19:10	Hawsawi 63'			Stadium: Al-Shoulla Club Stadium; Referee: Mohammed Al-Shehri

17 August 2015 9	Al-Orobah (2)	2–1	Al Tai (2)	Sakakah
19:40	Al-Joni 8', 21' (pen.)		Mohammed Ishak 42'	Stadium: Al-Orobah Club Stadium; Referee: Hassan Al-Asmari

17 August 2015 5	Al-Riyadh (2)	0–1	Al-Shabab (1)	Riyadh
20:45			Al-Mofarrej 90+4' (o.g.)	Stadium: Prince Faisal bin Fahd Stadium; Referee: Mishari Al-Mishari

24 August 2015 12	Al-Hazem (2)	2–4	Al-Wehda (1)	Ar Rass
19:15	Wazani 40'; Al-Harbi 61'		Madkhali 5'; Faresi 9'; Otaif 52', 57'	Stadium: Al-Hazem Club Stadium; Referee: Abdullah Al-Awidan

24 August 2015 7	Al-Nassr (1)	5–0	Al-Mujazzal (2)	Riyadh
20:45	Fabián 35', 66'; Al-Sahlawi 54', 90+3'; Al-Shehri 73'			Stadium: Prince Faisal bin Fahd Stadium; Referee: Mishari Al-Mishari

== Second stage ==
=== Bracket ===
Round of 16
A	Al-Hilal	2
H	Al-Taawoun	1
A	Al-Qadisiyah (aet)	1
H	Al-Faisaly	0
A	Al-Shoulla	1
H	Al-Shabab (aet)	2
A	Al-Nahda	1
H	Al-Nassr	5
A	Al-Ahli	4
H	Hajer	2
H	Al-Orobah	0
A	Al-Ettifaq (aet)	1
A	Al-Khaleej (aet)	4
H	Al-Wehda	2
A	Najran	1
H	Al-Ittihad	2

Quarter-finals
H	Al-Hilal	4
A	Al-Qadisiyah	1
H	Al-Shabab	1
A	Al-Nassr	0
H	Al-Ahli	1
A	Al-Ettifaq	0
H	Al-Khaleej	1
A	Al-Ittihad	2

Semi-finals
H	Al-Hilal	4
A	Al-Shabab	0
A	Al-Ahli	1
H	Al-Ittihad	0

Final
–	Al-Hilal	2
–	Al-Ahli	1

Note: H: Home team, A: Away team

=== Round of 16 ===
The Round of 16 fixtures were played on 11 & 12 September 2015. The Al-Taawoun v Al-Hilal match was delayed to 30 November 2015 due to Al-Hilal's participation in the quarter-finals of the 2015 AFC Champions League. All times are local, AST (UTC+3).

11 September 2015 16	Al-Faisaly (1)	0–1 (a.e.t.)	Al-Qadisiyah (1)	Al Majma'ah
18:45		Report	Abo Shararah 114'	Stadium: King Salman Sport City Stadium; Referee: Abdulrahman Al-Shehri

11 September 2015 16	Al-Orobah (2)	0–1 (a.e.t.)	Al-Ettifaq (2)	Sakakah
19:10		Report	Gonçalves 93' (pen.)	Stadium: Al-Orobah Club Stadium; Referee: Mishari Al-Mishari

11 September 2015 17	Al-Shabab (1)	2–1 (a.e.t.)	Al-Shoulla (2)	Riyadh
20:45	Al-Hashan 47'; Al-Qumaizi 93'	Report	Al-Jehani 79'	Stadium: Prince Faisal bin Fahd Stadium; Referee: Faisal Al-Blwi

11 September 2015 21	Al-Wehda (1)	2–4 (a.e.t.)	Al-Khaleej (1)	Makkah
20:45	Otaif 22', 44'	Report	Sylla 34'; Al-Turki 75'; Al-Rashid 94'; Majrashi 109'	Stadium: King Abdul Aziz Stadium; Referee: Khaled Al-Teris

12 September 2015 19	Hajer (1)	2–4	Al-Ahli (1)	Al-Hasa
18:30	Al-Saiari 78'; Ceran 90+1'	Report	Hawsawi 7'; Al Somah 18'; Fetfatzidis 81'; Seraj 90+3'	Stadium: Prince Abdullah bin Jalawi Stadium; Referee: Fahad Al-Oraini

12 September 2015 18	Al-Nassr (1)	5–1	Al-Nahda (2)	Riyadh
18:40	Maïga 17', 80', 90+3'; Mierzejewski 45+2'; Al-Sahlawi 64'	Report	Al-Dhiyabi 90'	Stadium: King Fahd International Stadium; Attendance: 2,119; Referee: Mohammed Al-Hoaish

12 September 2015 22	Al-Ittihad (1)	2–1	Najran (1)	Jeddah
20:45	Noor 13', 60' (pen.)	Report	Wahib 74'	Stadium: King Abdullah Sports City; Attendance: 25,000; Referee: Saleh Al-Hathlool

30 November 2015 15	Al-Taawoun (1)	1–2	Al-Hilal (1)	Buraidah
19:30	Al-Khamees 90+2'	Report	Al-Shamrani 19' (pen.); Aílton 56'	Stadium: King Abdullah Sport City Stadium; Referee: Shukri Al-Hanfoush

=== Quarter-finals ===
The Quarter-finals fixtures were played on 22 & 23 October 2015. The Al-Hilal v Al-Qadisiyah match was delayed due to Al-Hilal's participation in the semi-finals of the 2015 AFC Champions League. All times are local, AST (UTC+3).

22 October 2015 26	Al-Khaleej (1)	1–2	Al-Ittihad (1)	Khobar
20:00	Al Salem 6'	Report	Troisi 80'; Sânmărtean 87'	Stadium: Prince Saud bin Jalawi Stadium; Attendance: 4,226; Referee: Marai Al Awaji

23 October 2015 25	Al-Ahli (1)	1–0	Al-Ettifaq (2)	Jeddah
20:00	Al Somah 70'	Report		Stadium: King Abdullah Sports City; Attendance: 15,453; Referee: Shukri Al-Hanfoush

23 October 2015 24	Al-Shabab (1)	1–0	Al Nassr (1)	Riyadh
20:00	Affonso 90+2'	Report		Stadium: King Fahd International Stadium; Referee: Saleh Al-Hathlool

28 December 2015 23	Al-Hilal (1)	4–1	Al-Qadisiyah (1)	Riyadh
17:50	Eduardo 36', 65'; Al-Shamrani 54' (pen.); Al-Qahtani 84'	Report	N. Hazazi 39'	Stadium: Prince Faisal bin Fahd Stadium; Attendance: 5,076; Referee: Mohammed Al-Hoaish

=== Semi-finals ===
The Semi-finals fixtures were played on 31 December 2015 and 1 January 2016. All times are local, AST (UTC+3).

31 December 2015 28	Al-Ittihad (1)	0–1	Al-Ahli (1)	Jeddah
20:00		Report	Hamad 44'	Stadium: King Abdullah Sports City; Attendance: 53,256; Referee: Turki Al-Khudhayr

1 January 2016 27	Al-Hilal (1)	4–0	Al-Shabab (1)	Riyadh
20:00	Al-Shahrani 25'; Aílton 48'; Eduardo 69' (pen.); Al-Faraj 74'	Report		Stadium: King Fahd International Stadium; Attendance: 11,970; Referee: Shukri Al-Hanfoush

=== Final ===
The final was held on 19 February 2016 in the King Fahd International Stadium in Riyadh. All times are local, AST (UTC+3).

19 February 2016
20:30

Al-Hilal	2–1	Al-Ahli
Al-Shamrani 4'; Al-Abed 33'	Report	Al-Jassim 90'

King Fahd International Stadium, Riyadh
Referee: Marai Al-Awaji

=== Winner ===
2015–16 Crown Prince Cup
Winners
Al-Hilal
13th Title

== Top goalscorers ==
As of 19 February 2016

Rank	Player	Club	Goals
1	(Saudi Arabia) Saqer Otaif	Al-Wehda	4
2	(Saudi Arabia) Nasser Al-Shamrani	Al-Hilal	3
2	(Mali) Modibo Maïga	Al-Nassr	3
2	(Brazil) Carlos Eduardo	Al-Hilal	3
2	(Saudi Arabia) Mohammad Al-Sahlawi	Al-Nassr	3
