= Ahmed Darwish =

Ahmed Darwish may refer to:

- Ahmed Darwish (footballer, born 1984), Saudi football player
- Ahmed Darwish (footballer, born 2000), Emirati footballer
- Ahmed Darwish (politician) (born 1959), Egyptian politician
- Ahmed Darwish (sport shooter) (born 1981), Egyptian sport shooter

== See also ==
- Ahmad Darwish, Syrian footballer
- Ahmad Darwich, Lebanese-Danish DJ
