= Ahmed Darwish (footballer, born 2000) =

Emirati association football player

Ahmed Darwish أحمد درويش
Personal information
- Full name: Ahmed Darwish Mohammed Al Ali
- Date of birth: 29 September 2000 (age 26)
- Place of birth: Emirates
- Height: 1.79 m (5 ft 10 in)
- Position: Defender

Youth career
- –2019: Al-Fujairah

Senior career*
Years	Team	Apps	(Gls)
2019–2022	Al-Fujairah	11	(0)
2022–2023	Al-Nasr	0	(0)
2023–2024	Dibba Al-Hisn		
- * Club domestic league appearances and goals

Ahmed Darwish (Arabic:أحمد درويش) (born 29 September 2000) is an Emirati professional footballer who plays as a defender.

== Career ==
Ahmed Darwish started his career at Al-Fujairah and is a product of the Al-Fujairah's youth system. On 20 September 2019, Ahmed Darwish made his professional debut for Al-Fujairah against Al-Wahda in the Pro League .

== Career statistics ==
=== Club ===
As of 15 July 2020.

Club	Season	League			Cup			President Cup			Champions League			Total		
Club	Season	Apps	Goals	Assists	Apps	Goals	Assists	Apps	Goals	Assists	Apps	Goals	Assists	Apps	Goals	Assists
Al-Fujairah	2019–20	7	0	0	6	0	0	0	0	0	—			13	0	0
Al-Fujairah	Total	7	0	0	6	0	0	0	0	0	—			13	0	0
Career total		7	0	0	6	0	0	—						13	0	0
