= Theab Majrashi =

Saudi Arabian footballer

Theab Majrashi ذياب مجرشي
Personal information
- Full name: Theab Majrashi
- Date of birth: 25 March 1983 (age 43)
- Place of birth: Saudi Arabia
- Height: 1.80 m (5 ft 11 in)
- Position: Defender

Youth career
- Al-Hilal

Senior career*
Years	Team	Apps	(Gls)
2003–2004	Al-Hilal		
2004	→ Al-Najma (loan)		
2004–2011	Al-Hazem		
2011–2013	Al-Taawoun		
2013–2014	Al-Riyadh		
2016–2017	Sdoos		
2017–2018	Al-Washm		
2018–2019	Sdoos		
2021	Al-Anwar		
- * Club domestic league appearances and goals as of 30 July 2020

Theab Majrashi (Arabic: ذياب مجرشي; born 25 March 1983) is a Saudi Arabian footballer who plays as a defender.

== Career ==
He formerly played for Al-Hilal, Al-Najma, Al-Hazem, Al-Taawoun, Al-Riyadh, Sdoos, and Al-Washm.
