= Azzan Maqbol =

Saudi Arabian footballer

Personal information
- Full name: Azzan Maqbol
- Date of birth: April 24, 1984 (age 42)
- Place of birth: Saudi Arabia
- Height: 1.79 m (5 ft 10 in)
- Positions: Defender; midfielder

Senior career*
Years	Team	Apps	(Gls)
2005–2015	Najran SC	92	(3)
2015–2016	Al-Nojoom		
2016–2019	Najran SC		
- * Club domestic league appearances and goals

Azzan Maqbol (Arabic: عزان مقبول; born April 24, 1984) is a Saudi Arabian professional footballer who plays as a midfielder.
