= 2012–13 Saudi Crown Prince Cup =

2012–13 Crown Prince Cup
Tournament details
- Country: Saudi Arabia
- Dates: 16 September 2012 – 22 February 2013
- Teams: 64 (all); 50 (qualifying competition); 16 (main competition)

Final positions
- Champions: Al-Hilal (12th title)
- Runners-up: Al-Nassr

Tournament statistics
- Matches played: 15
- Goals scored: 50 (3.33 per match)
- Top goal scorer(s): Naby Soumah; Mohammad Al-Sahlawi (3 goals each)
- All statistics correct as of 22 February 2013. (Note: All statistics do not include qualifying play-offs)

The 2012–13 Saudi Crown Prince Cup was the 38th season of the Saudi Crown Prince Cup since its establishment in 1957. This season's competition featured a total of 16 teams, 14 teams from the Pro League, and 2 teams from the qualifying rounds.

The 2013 Crown Prince Cup Final was played between Al-Hilal and Al-Nassr at the King Fahd International Stadium in Riyadh. Al-Hilal defeated Al-Nassr 4–2 on penalties (1–1 after extra time) in the final to win a record-extending twelfth Crown Prince Cup title and their sixth one in a row.

== Qualifying rounds ==
All of the competing teams that are not members of the Pro League competed in the qualifying rounds to secure one of 2 available places in the Round of 16. First Division sides Al-Qadisiyah and Al-Orobah qualified.

=== Preliminary round 1 ===
The Preliminary Round 1 matches were played on 16 September 2012.

Home team (tier)	Score	Away team (tier)
Sunday 16 September 2012
Al-Baha (4)	4–1	Sharurah (4)
Al-Jandal (4)	0–4	Al-Tadamon (4)

=== Preliminary round 2 ===
The Preliminary Round 2 matches were played on 19, 20 & 21 September 2012.

Home team (tier)	Score	Away team (tier)
Wednesday 19 September 2012
Al-Adalah (3)	1–0	Al-Omran (4)
Al-Taraji (3)	0–0 (6–7 p)	Al-Oyoon (3)
Al-Safa (3)	3–0	Al-Muheet (4)
Al-Fayha (3)	0–0 (4–5 p)	Al-Mujazzal (3)
Al-Kawkab (3)	2–1	Al-Badaya (3)
Al-Diriyah (3)	4–1	Al-Washm (4)
Al-Arabi (3)	6–0	Al-Jawaa (4)
Damac (3)	0–0 (6–5 p)	Al-Sarawat (4)
Al-Tuhami (3)	8–1	Al-Nakhil (4)
Thursday 20 September 2012
Al-Hamadah (3)	2–0	Najd (3)
Al-Jabalain (3)	4–1	Jubbah (4)
Friday 21 September 2012
Al-Ain (3)	3–0	Al-Baha (4)
Wej (3)	2–0	Al-Tasamoh (4)
Ohod (3)	3–0	Al-Majd (4)
Al-Qala (3)	2–3	Al-Tadamon (4)
Al-Suqoor (3)	5–2	Al-Hawraa (4)

=== First round ===
The First Round matches were played on 3 & 4 October 2012.

Home team (tier)	Score	Away team (tier)
Wednesday 3 October 2012
Al-Qadisiyah (2)	3–2	Al-Kawkab (3)
Al-Jeel (2)	4–2	Al-Adalah (3)
Al-Riyadh (2)	0–1	Al-Diriyah (3)
Sdoos (2)	4–2	Wej (3)
Hetten (2)	3–1	Al-Tuhami (3)
Abha (2)	2–0	Damac (3)
Al-Rabe'e (2)	5–1	Al-Ain (3)
Thursday 4 October 2012
Al-Khaleej (2)	1–0	Al-Safa (3)
Al-Nahda (2)	2–1	Al-Oyoon (3)
Al-Batin (2)	5–0	Al-Hamadah (3)
Al-Najma (2)	2–0	Al-Arabi (3)
Al-Hazem (2)	1–3	Al-Mujazzal (3)
Al-Tai (2)	4–2	Al-Jabalain (3)
Al-Orobah (2)	4–0	Al-Tadamon (4)
Al-Ansar (2)	3–1	Ohod (3)
Al-Watani (2)	0–1	Al-Suqoor (3)

=== Second round ===
The Second Round matches were played on 14 & 21 October 2012.

Home team (tier)	Score	Away team (tier)
Sunday 14 October 2012
Al-Qadisiyah (2)	4–0	Al-Diriyah (3)
Al-Khaleej (2)	0–0 (4–1 p)	Al-Jeel (2)
Al-Batin (2)	3–1	Al-Najma (2)
Al-Mujazzal (3)	2–1	Al-Nahda (2)
Hetten (2)	2–4	Abha (2)
Al-Orobah (2)	4–2	Al-Tai (2)
Al-Ansar (2)	4–0	Al-Suqoor (3)
Sunday 21 October 2012
Sdoos (2)	3–4	Al-Rabe'e (2)

=== Third round ===
The Third Round matches were played on 4 November and 2 December 2012.

Home team (tier)	Score	Away team (tier)
Sunday 4 November 2012
Abha (2)	3–2	Al-Rabe'e (2)
Al-Batin (2)	3–5	Al-Mujazzal (3)
Al-Qadisiyah (2)	3–0	Al-Khaleej (2)
Sunday 2 December 2012
Al-Orobah (2)	1–1 (7–6 p)	Al-Ansar (2)

=== Final round ===
The Final Round matches were played on 18 November and 10 December 2012.

Home team (tier)	Score	Away team (tier)
Sunday 18 November 2012
Al-Qadisiyah (2)	2–1	Abha (2)
Monday 10 December 2012
Al-Orobah (2)	4–1	Al-Mujazzal (3)

== Bracket ==
Round of 16
A	Al-Hilal	2
H	Najran	1
H	Al-Fateh	3
A	Al-Orobah	2
A	Al-Ettifaq	0
H	Al-Wehda (a.e.t.)	1
H	Al Faisaly	5
A	Hajer	2
H	Al-Ahli	4
A	Al-Shoulla	1
A	Al-Nassr	4
H	Al-Taawoun	2
H	Al-Shabab	2
A	Al-Raed (a.e.t.)	3
H	Al-Ittihad	0
A	Al-Qadisiyah	2

Quarter-finals
A	Al-Hilal	2
H	Al-Fateh	0
H	Al-Wehda	0
A	Al Faisaly	3
H	Al-Ahli	1
A	Al-Nassr	2
A	Al-Raed	2
H	Al-Qadisiyah	1

Semi-finals
A	Al-Hilal	1
H	Al Faisaly	0
A	Al-Nassr	2
H	Al-Raed	0

Final
–	Al-Hilal (pen.)	1 (4)
–	Al-Nassr	1 (2)

Note: H: Home team, A: Away team

== Round of 16 ==
The Round of 16 fixtures were played on 18 & 19 December 2012. All times are local, AST (UTC+3).

18 December 2012 5	Al-Ahli (1)	4–1	Al-Shoulla (1)	Mecca
19:40	Simões 8', 22'; Al-Jassim 47'; Al-Hosni 60'	Report	Al-Ajlan 67'	Stadium: King Abdul Aziz Stadium; Referee: Shukri Al-Hanfoush

18 December 2012 6	Al-Taawoun (1)	2–4	Al-Nassr (1)	Buraidah
19:40	Bouguèche 26'; Al-Harbi 76' (pen.)	Report	Al-Sahlawi 33', 54'; Abd Rabo 36', 67'	Stadium: King Abdullah Sport City Stadium; Attendance: 4,420; Referee: Marai Al-Awaji

18 December 2012 7	Al-Shabab (1)	2–3 (a.e.t.)	Al-Raed (1)	Riyadh
19:40	Al-Shamrani 68'; Camacho 84'	Report	Diba Ilunga 5', 107'; Al-Sherif 61'	Stadium: Prince Faisal bin Fahd Stadium; Referee: Mohammed Al-Hoaish

19 December 2012 3	Al-Wehda (1)	1–0 (a.e.t.)	Al-Ettifaq (1)	Mecca
17:00	Seraj 120+1' (pen.)	Report		Stadium: King Abdul Aziz Stadium; Referee: Amer Al-Shehri

19 December 2012 1	Najran (1)	1–2	Al-Hilal (1)	Najran
19:40	Al-Raheb 34'	Report	Hermach 10'; Byung-soo 33'	Stadium: Al Akhdoud Club Stadium; Referee: Abdulrahman Al-Malki

19 December 2012 2	Al-Fateh (1)	3–2	Al-Orobah (2)	Al-Hasa
19:40	Al-Khodari 41'; Fuakumputu 43', 56'	Report	Al-Enezi 58', 82'	Stadium: Prince Abdullah bin Jalawi Stadium; Referee: Badr Al-Enezi

19 December 2012 4	Al-Faisaly (1)	5–2	Hajer (1)	Al Majma'ah
19:40	Al-Ajmi 8'; Salem 18'; Al-Nemri 43'; Soumah 45', 54'	Report	Al-Shahrani 46', 66'	Stadium: Prince Salman Sport City Stadium; Referee: Turki Al-Khudhayr

19 December 2012 8	Al-Ittihad (1)	0–2	Al-Qadisiyah (2)	Mecca
21:00		Report	Al-Sobeai 10'; Al-Amri 45+1'	Stadium: King Abdul Aziz Stadium; Attendance: 4,842; Referee: Sami Al-Nemri

== Quarter-finals ==
The quarter-finals fixtures were played on 22 & 23 December 2012. All times are local, AST (UTC+3).

22 December 2012 11	Al-Ahli (1)	1–2	Al-Nassr (1)	Mecca
19:40	Al-Harbi 8'	Report	Al-Zylaeei 11'; Otaif 78'	Stadium: King Abdul Aziz Stadium; Attendance: 11,036; Referee: Abdulrahman Al-Amri

23 December 2012 9	Al-Fateh (1)	0–2	Al-Hilal (1)	Al-Hasa
19:40		Report	Hermach 25'; Wesley 79'	Stadium: Prince Abdullah bin Jalawi Stadium; Attendance: 10,134; Referee: Khalil Al-Ghamdi

23 December 2012 10	Al-Wehda (1)	0–3	Al-Faisaly (1)	Mecca
19:40		Report	Jahfali 19'; Al-Nemri 74'; Soumah 87'	Stadium: King Abdul Aziz Stadium; Referee: Fahad Al-Mirdasi

23 December 2012 12	Al-Qadisiyah (2)	1–2	Al-Raed (1)	Khobar
19:40	Al-Najrani 65'	Report	Erraki 45'; Belal 80'	Stadium: Prince Saud bin Jalawi Stadium; Referee: Abdulrahman Al-Malki

== Semi-finals ==
The semi-finals fixtures were played on 9 February 2013. All times are local, AST (UTC+3).

9 February 2013 13	Al-Faisaly (1)	0–1	Al-Hilal (1)	Al Majma'ah
18:30		Report	Al-Qahtani 57'	Stadium: Prince Salman Sport City Stadium; Referee: Saleh Al-Hathlool

9 February 2013 14	Al-Raed (1)	0–2	Al-Nassr (1)	Buraidah
20:30		Report	Bastos 23'; Al-Sahlawi 88' (pen.)	Stadium: King Abdullah Sport City Stadium; Referee: Marai Al-Awaji

== Final ==
The final was held on 22 February 2013 in the King Fahd International Stadium in Riyadh. All times are local, AST (UTC+3).

22 February 2013
20:35

Al-Hilal	1–1 (a.e.t.)	Al-Nassr
Al-Shalhoub 118' (pen.)	Report	Al-Raheb 120'
Penalties
Al-Qahtani (penalty scored); Ozéia (penalty scored); Massad (penalty missed); Al-Shalhoub (penalty scored); Al-Abed (penalty scored)	4–2	(penalty missed) Abd Rabo; (penalty scored) Ghaleb; (penalty missed) Charisteas; (penalty scored) Abdulghani

King Fahd International Stadium, Riyadh
Attendance: 58,430
Referee: Gianluca Rocchi (Italy)

== Top goalscorers ==
Updated 22 February 2013

Rank	Player	Club	Goals
1	(Guinea) Naby Soumah	Al-Faisaly	3
1	(Saudi Arabia) Mohammad Al-Sahlawi	Al-Nassr	3
3	(Democratic Republic of the Congo) Doris Fuakumputu	Al-Fateh	2
3	(Saudi Arabia) Hassan Al-Raheb	Najran / Al-Nassr	2
3	(Egypt) Hosny Abd Rabo	Al-Nassr	2
3	(Saudi Arabia) Mashari Al-Enezi	Al-Orobah	2
3	(Morocco) Adil Hermach	Al-Hilal	2
3	(Saudi Arabia) Mohammed Al-Shahrani	Hajer	2
3	(Saudi Arabia) Sultan Al-Nemri	Al-Faisaly	2
3	(Democratic Republic of the Congo) Yves Diba Ilunga	Al-Raed	2
3	(Brazil) Victor Simões	Al-Ahli	2
