= Ahmed Darwish (footballer, born 1984) =

Saudi Arabian footballer

Personal information
- Full name: Ahmad Faraj Darwish
- Date of birth: October 29, 1984 (age 41)
- Place of birth: Jeddah, Saudi Arabia
- Height: 1.76 m (5 ft 9 1/2 in)
- Position: Midfielder

Youth career
- 2002–2005: Al-Ahli

Senior career*
Years	Team	Apps	(Gls)
2004–2013	Al-Ahli	198	(11)

International career
2007–2012	Saudi Arabia	8	(0)
- * Club domestic league appearances and goals

Ahmad Faraj Darwish (Arabic: أحمد فرج درويش; born 29 October 1984) is a former Saudi Arabian football midfielder.

== Honours ==
=== Al-Ahli (Jeddah) ===
- Saudi Crown Prince Cup: 2007
- Gulf Club Champions Cup: 2008
- Saudi Champions Cup: 2011, 2012

=== National team ===
2007 AFC Asian Cup: Runner-up
