= Osama Hawsawi =

Saudi Arabian footballer

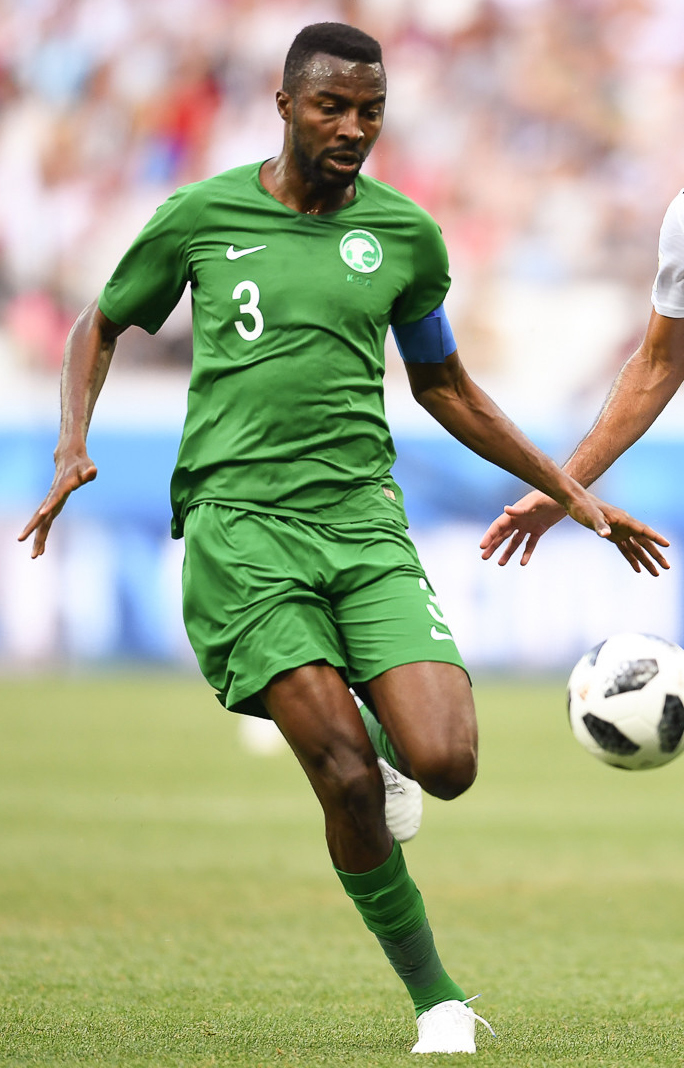
- Hawsawi with Saudi Arabia at the 2018 FIFA World Cup

Personal information
- Full name: Osama Abdulrzag Hawsawi
- Date of birth: 31 March 1984 (age 42)
- Place of birth: Mecca, Saudi Arabia
- Height: 1.87 m (6 ft 2 in)
- Position: Central defender

Youth career
- Al-Wehda

Senior career*
Years	Team	Apps	(Gls)
2005–2008	Al-Wehda	59	(1)
2008–2012	Al-Hilal	79	(7)
2012	→ Anderlecht (loan)	1	(0)
2012–2016	Al-Ahli	83	(6)
2016–2018	Al-Hilal	44	(0)
2018	Al-Wehda	12	(0)
Total		278	(14)

International career^{‡}
2006–2018	Saudi Arabia	138	(7)
Medal record
Representing Saudi Arabia
Men's Football
AFC Asian Cup
Runner-up	2007 Indonesia/Malaysia/ Thailand/Vietnam
- * Club domestic league appearances and goals as of 19:00, 26 August 2018 (UTC) ‡ National team caps and goals as of 17:21, 25 June 2018 (UTC)

Osama Abdulrzag Hawsawi (Arabic: أسامة عبد الرزاق هوساوي, born 31 March 1984) is a former Saudi Arabian footballer who played as a central defender.

After starting out at Al-Wehda, he went on to spend the vast majority of his career with Al-Hilal and Al-Ahli. He won several major titles with both clubs, including five Pro League titles, five Crown Prince Cups and two King Cups. He was the first Saudi player to play in the Belgian Pro League.

Hawsawi earned 138 caps for the Saudi Arabia national team between 2006 and 2018, playing at three AFC Asian Cups, captaining the side at the 2018 World Cup and finishing as runner-up at the 2007 AFC Asian Cup.

== Club career ==
=== Al Wehda ===
Hawsawi began his professional football career at Al-Wehda Club and soon after became a regular in the first team, playing as a central defender.

=== Al Hilal ===
After making 59 appearances and scoring once, Hawsawi joined Al-Hilal. While at Al-Hilal, Hawsawi was a regular player under the manager of Eric Gerets, Hawsawi was appointed the captain. Hawsawi won seven titles with Al-Hilal. Three league titles (in 2008, 2010 and 2011 seasons) and 4 Crown Prince Cup.

=== Anderlecht ===
In April 2012, Hawsawi signed a two-year contract with Belgian side Anderlecht, making him the only member of the Saudi Arabia national football team to play in Europe at the time. Hawsawi was the first Saudi Arabian to play for the club and in the league. He described his time at Anderlecht as 'forgettable' due to lack of playing time at the club and only made one appearance for the club when played as a centre back in a 1–1 draw against OH Leuven on 25 August 2012. Hawsawi was also on the substitute bench when Anderlecht won the Belgian Super Cup but he wasn't substituted.

=== Al-Ahli ===
In November 2012, Hawsawi finally left Belgium to return to his homeland by joining Al-Ahli for 1.5 million.

=== Al-Hilal ===
In 2016, Al-Hilal made Hawsawi return to Al-Hilal for 5.5 million dollars (21 million riyals). In his first season he won the Saudi King's Cup & the Saudi Professional League. In his second season with Al-Hilal, he helped the club win a second consecutive league title and reach the finals of the 2017 AFC Champions League.

=== Al-Wehda return ===
On 23 August 2018 Osama Hawsawi signed for his boyhood club Al-Wehda for free following the expiration of his contract.

=== Retirement ===
On 26 December 2018 Osama Hawsawi announced his retirement from football on his personal twitter account.

== International career ==
He was the captain in the Saudi Arabia team. He appeared for his country for the 18th Arabian Gulf Cup and was a member of the Saudi team at the FIFA World Youth Championship. He was called-up in the squad for the 2007 AFC Asian Cup.

On 29 May 2010, he scored an excellent goal against Spain, after a corner kick which put the Saudi Arabian team ahead 1-0 against Spain, scoring his second goal against the Saudi Arabia national team.

In June 2018 he was included in the Saudi Arabia national football team for the 2018 FIFA World Cup in Russia, captaining his side in all three matches at the finals.

== Career statistics ==
Updated 26 December 2018

=== Club ===
Club	Season	League		Cup		Continental		Total	
Club	Season	Apps	Goals	Apps	Goals	Apps	Goals	Apps	Goals
Al-Wehda	2005–06	18	1	4	0	-	-	22	1
Al-Wehda	2006–07	20	0	1	0	-	-	21	0
Al-Wehda	2007–08	21	0	1	0	4	0	26	0
Total		59	1	6	0	4	0	69	1
Al-Hilal	2008–09	19	2	4	1	7	1	30	4
Al-Hilal	2009–10	18	2	4	0	10	1	32	3
Al-Hilal	2010–11	23	1	6	1	7	0	36	2
Al-Hilal	2011–12	23	2	6	0	6	0	35	2
Total		83	7	14	2	24	2	133	11
R.S.C. Anderlecht	2012–13	1	0	1	0	0	0	2	0
Al-Ahli	2012–13	10	0	5	0	10	0	25	0
Al-Ahli	2013–14	24	1	6	0	0	0	30	1
Al-Ahli	2014–15	26	4	5	0	8	0	39	4
Al-Ahli	2015–16	23	1	6	0	2	0	31	1
Total		83	6	22	0	20	0	125	6
Al-Hilal	2016–17	25	0	6	0	12	0	43	0
Al-Hilal	2017–18	19	0	1	0	3	0	23	0
Total		44	0	7	0	15	0	66	0
Al-Wehda	2018–19	12	0	0	0	0	0	12	0
Career Total		282	14	50	2	63	2	407	18

=== International ===
Statistics accurate as of match played 25 June 2018.

Saudi Arabia
Year	Apps	Goals
2006	1	0
2007	19	0
2008	18	2
2009	19	0
2010	7	2
2011	14	1
2012	7	0
2013	9	1
2014	9	0
2015	9	1
2016	8	0
2017	9	0
2018	9	0
Total	138	7

=== International goals ===
#	Date	Venue	Opponent	Score	Result	Competition
1.	2 June 2008	King Fahd Stadium, Riyadh, Saudi Arabia	Lebanon	2–1	4–1	2010 FIFA World Cup qualification
2.	27 December 2008	Prince Mohamed bin Fahd Stadium, Dammam, Saudi Arabia	Syria	1–0	1–1	Friendly
3.	29 May 2010	Tivoli Neu, Innsbruck, Austria	Spain	1–0	2–3	Friendly
4.	31 December 2010	Bahrain National Stadium, Manama, Bahrain	Bahrain	1–0	1–0	Friendly
5.	28 July 2011	Siu Sai Wan Sports Ground, Siu Sai Wan, Hong Kong	Hong Kong	5–0	5–0	2014 FIFA World Cup qualification
6.	15 October 2013	Amman International Stadium, Amman, Jordan	Iraq	1–0	2–0	2015 AFC Asian Cup qualification
7.	17 November 2015	National Stadium, Dili, East Timor	Timor-Leste	2–0	10–0	2018 FIFA World Cup qualification
Correct as of 25 June 2018

== Honours ==
=== Club ===
Al-Hilal

- Pro League: 2009–10, 2010–11, 2016–17, 2017–18
- King Cup: 2017
- Crown Prince Cup: 2008–09, 2009–10, 2010–11, 2011–12

Al-Ahli

- Pro League: 2015–16
- King Cup: 2016
- Crown Prince Cup: 2014–15

== See also ==
- List of men's footballers with 100 or more international caps
