= 2007–08 Saudi Crown Prince Cup =

2007–08 Crown Prince Cup
Tournament details
- Country: Saudi Arabia
- Dates: 29 November 2007 – 7 March 2008
- Teams: 44 (all); 32 (qualifying competition); 16 (main competition)

Final positions
- Champions: Al-Hilal (7th title)
- Runners-up: Al-Ettifaq

Tournament statistics
- Matches played: 17
- Goals scored: 54 (3.18 per match)
- Top goal scorer(s): Prince Tagoe (5 goals)
- All statistics correct as of 7 March 2008. (Note: All statistics do not include qualifying play-offs)

The 2007–08 Crown Prince Cup was the 33rd season of the Saudi premier knockout tournament since its establishment in 1957. It started with the qualifying rounds on 29 November 2007 and concluded with the final on 7 March 2008.

Premier League side Al-Ahli were the defending champions, but they were eliminated by Al-Ettifaq in the semi-finals. Al-Hilal won their seventh Crown Prince Cup title after defeating Al-Ettifaq 2–0 in the final.

== Qualifying rounds ==
All of the competing teams that are not members of the Premier League competed in the qualifying rounds to secure one of 4 available places in the Round of 16. The qualifying competition began on 29 November 2007.

=== First round ===
The first-round matches were played on 29 November 2007.

Home team (tier)	Score	Away team (tier)
Thursday 29 November 2007
Al-Riyadh (2)	5–2 (a.e.t.)	Al-Batin (4)
Al-Shoulla (3)	1–0	Wej (4)
Al-Diriyah (3)	0–3	Sdoos (2)
Al-Khaleej (2)	0–1	Al-Nahda (3)
Al-Ansar (2)	1–0	Al-Hait (4)
Ohod (2)	2–2 (4–5 p)	Al-Rabe'e (3)
Hajer (2)	1–3	Al-Adalah (3)
Al-Fateh (2)	1–1 (10–9 p)	Al-Taraji (4)
Al-Najma (3)	1–2	Al-Taawoun (2)
Al-Raed (2)	2–1 (a.e.t.)	Al-Fayha (2)
Al-Hamadah (3)	2–1	Al-Faisaly (2)
Al-Jabalain (2)	2–0	Al-Qotah (3)
Hetten (3)	2–2 (2–4 p)	Al-Tuhami (3)
Damac (2)	2–1	Al-Akhdoud (3)
Abha (2)	6–0	Al-Yarmuk (4)
Al-Orobah (3)	4–0	Al-Tadamon (4)

=== Second round ===
The second-round matches were played on 6 December 2007.

Home team (tier)	Score	Away team (tier)
Thursday 6 December 2007
Al-Adalah (3)	1–1 (5–6 p)	Al-Fateh (2)
Al-Riyadh (2)	2–1	Sdoos (2)
Al-Shoulla (3)	2–0	Al-Nahda (3)
Al-Taawoun (2)	2–1 (a.e.t.)	Al-Raed (4)
Al-Hamadah (3)	4–4 (5–6 p)	Al-Jabalain (2)
Abha (2)	0–1	Damac (2)
Al-Orobah (3)	2–3	Al-Tuhami (3)
Al-Ansar (2)	0–2	Al-Rabe'e (3)

=== Final round ===
The Final Round matches were played on 12 December 2007.

Home team (tier)	Score	Away team (tier)
Wednesday 12 December 2007
Al-Riyadh (2)	1–0	Al-Shoulla (3)
Al-Taawoun (2)	0–1	Al-Jabalain (2)
Al-Rabe'e (3)	2–0	Al-Fateh (2)
Al-Tuhami (3)	1–2	Damac (2)

== Bracket ==
Round of 16
A	Al-Nassr	0
H	Al-Hilal	2
H	Al-Riyadh	0
A	Al-Hazem	1
H	Al-Shabab	2
A	Damac	1
A	Al-Watani (pen.)	2 (5)
H	Al-Tai	2 (3)
H	Al-Qadisiyah	3
A	Al-Ittihad (a.e.t.)	4
H	Al-Ettifaq	5
A	Al-Rabe'e	0
H	Al-Wehda	2
A	Najran	3
A	Al-Jabalain	0
H	Al-Ahli	6

Quarter-finals
H	Al-Hilal (a.e.t.)	2
A	Al-Hazem	1
A	Al-Shabab	2
H	Al-Watani	0
H	Al-Ittihad	1
A	Al-Ettifaq	2
A	Najran	1
H	Al-Ahli	3

Semi-finals
A	Al-Hilal	0	1	1
H	Al-Shabab	0	0	0
A	Al-Ettifaq	2	2	4
H	Al-Ahli	2	1	3

Final
–	Al-Hilal	2
–	Al-Ettifaq	0

== Round of 16 ==
The Round of 16 fixtures were played on 8 and 9 February 2008. All times are local, AST (UTC+3).

8 February 2008 4	Al-Tai (1)	2–2 (a.e.t.) (3–5 p)	Al-Watani (1)	Ha'il
16:00	Abbas 45+2'; Al-Junaidi 67'	Report	Al-Shammari 44'; Al-Harbi 77'	Stadium: Prince Abdul Aziz bin Musa'ed Stadium; Referee: Mamdouh Al-Mirdas
	Penalties
	Hammad (penalty scored); Al-Junaidi (penalty scored); Al-Hassan (penalty missed); M. Al-Shammari (penalty scored)		(penalty scored) Traoré; (penalty scored) Houwes; (penalty scored) Hima; (penalty scored) Al-Blwi; (penalty scored) Al-Hamdan

8 February 2008 3	Al-Shabab (1)	2–0	Damac (2)	Riyadh
20:05	Al-Shamrani 40'; Martínez 71'	Report		Stadium: Prince Faisal bin Fahd Stadium; Referee: Dhafer Abo Zanda

8 February 2008 1	Al-Hilal (1)	2–0	Al-Nassr (1)	Riyadh
20:10	El Taib 24' (pen.); Al-Qahtani 80'	Report		Stadium: King Fahd International Stadium; Referee: Carlo Bertolini (Switzerland)

9 February 2008 6	Al-Ettifaq (1)	5–0	Al-Rabe'e (3)	Dammam
20:05	Tagoe 3', 24', 45'; Bashir 66'; F. Al-Dosari 90'	Report		Stadium: Prince Mohamed bin Fahd Stadium; Referee: Marai Al-Awaji

9 February 2008 2	Al-Riyadh (2)	0–1	Al-Hazem (1)	Riyadh
20:10		Report	Munawer 52'	Stadium: Prince Faisal bin Fahd Stadium

9 February 2008 7	Al-Wehda (1)	2–3	Najran (1)	Mecca
20:10	Quaye 36'; Al-Hazzani 42'	Report	Maqbol 19'; Safi 63'; Antônio 90+2'	Stadium: King Abdul Aziz Stadium

9 February 2008 8	Al-Ahli (1)	6–0	Al-Jabalain (3)	Jeddah
20:15	M. Al-Musa 9'; Massad 39', 90'; Mouath 60', 80'; Darwish 83'	Report		Stadium: Prince Abdullah Al Faisal Stadium; Referee: Abdulrahman Al-Jarwan

9 February 2008 5	Al-Qadisiyah (1)	3–4 (a.e.t.)	Al-Ittihad (1)	Khobar
20:20	Al-Sahlawi 46'; Al-Salem 56'; Al-Ghwinem 97'	Report	Kariri 10'; Keita 77', 117'; Noor 107' (pen.)	Stadium: Prince Saud bin Jalawi Stadium; Referee: Mutraf Al-Qahtani

== Quarter-finals ==
The quarter-finals fixtures were played on 13 and 14 February 2008. All times are local, AST (UTC+3).

13 February 2008 9	Al-Hilal (1)	2–1 (a.e.t.)	Al-Hazem (1)	Riyadh
20:00	Khathran 3'; Al-Qahtani 95'	Report	Al-Rashidi 50'	Stadium: Prince Faisal bin Fahd Stadium; Referee: Abdulrahman Al-Amri

13 February 2008 10	Al-Watani (1)	0–2	Al-Shabab (1)	Tabuk
20:00		Report	Martínez 48'; Muath 57'	Stadium: King Khalid Sport City Stadium; Referee: Dhafer Abo Zanda

13 February 2008 12	Al-Ahli (1)	3–1	Najran (1)	Jeddah
20:00	Mouath 21'; Darwish 36'; Al-Thagafi 55'	Report	Al-Yami 24'	Stadium: Prince Abdullah Al Faisal Stadium

14 February 2008 11	Al-Ittihad (1)	1–2	Al-Ettifaq (1)	Jeddah
20:15	Magno 5'	Report	Bashir 47'; Tagoe 90+3'	Stadium: Prince Abdullah Al Faisal Stadium; Referee: Saad Al-Kathairi

== Semi-finals ==
The semi-finals first legs were played on 26 and 27 February 2008 while the second legs were played on 1 and 2 March 2008. All times are local, AST (UTC+3).

Team 1	Agg.	Team 2	1st leg	2nd leg
Al-Hilal (1)	1–0	Al-Shabab (1)	0–0	1–0
Al-Ettifaq (1)	4–3	Al-Ahli (1)	2–2	2–1

=== Matches ===
26 February 2008
20:15

Al-Shabab (1)	0–0	Al-Hilal (1)
	Report

King Fahd International Stadium, Riyadh
Referee: Massimo Busacca (Switzerland)
1 March 2008
20:15

Al-Hilal (1)	1–0	Al-Shabab (1)
Al-Obaili 39' (o.g.)	Report

King Fahd International Stadium, Riyadh
Referee: Florian Meyer (Germany)

Al-Hilal won 1–0 on aggregate.

27 February 2008
20:15

Al-Ahli (1)	2–2	Al-Ettifaq (1)
Al-Musa 33'; Abbas 80'	Report	Al-Bishi 22'; Aqqal 56'

Prince Abdullah Al-Faisal Stadium, Jeddah
2 March 2008
20:15

Al-Ettifaq (1)	2–1	Al-Ahli (1)
Bashir 80'; Tagoe 81'	Report	Abdulghani 39'

Prince Mohamed bin Fahd Stadium, Dammam

Al-Ettifaq won 4–3 on aggregate.

== Final ==
The final was held on 7 March 2008 in the King Fahd International Stadium in Riyadh. All times are local, AST (UTC+3).

7 March 2008
20:15

Al-Hilal	2–0	Al-Ettifaq
Al-Qahtani 6'; El Taib 36' (pen.)	Report

King Fahd International Stadium, Riyadh
Referee: Thorsten Kinhöfer (Germany)

== Top goalscorers ==
As of 7 March 2008

Rank	Player	Club	Goals
1	(Ghana) Prince Tagoe	Al-Ettifaq	5
2	(Saudi Arabia) Malek Mouath	Al-Ahli	3
2	(Saudi Arabia) Saleh Bashir	Al-Ettifaq	3
2	(Saudi Arabia) Yasser Al-Qahtani	Al-Hilal	3

== See also ==
- 2007–08 Saudi Premier League
