= Salman Al-Faraj =

Saudi Arabian footballer

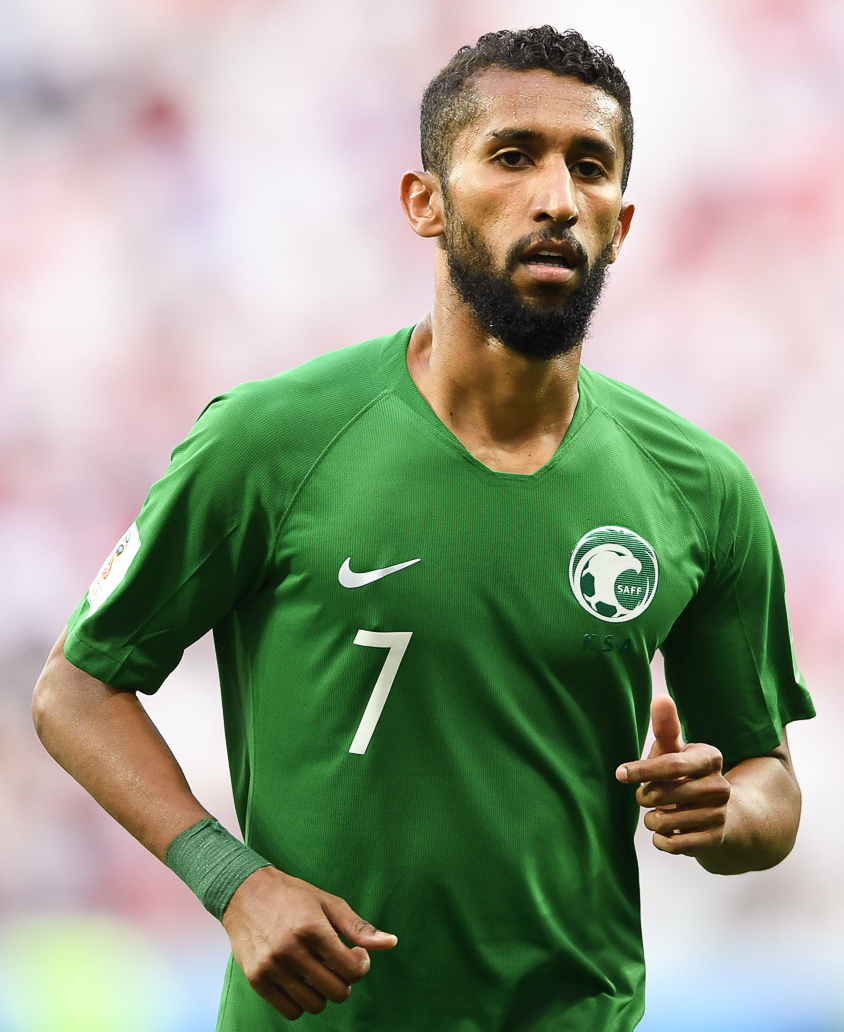
- Salman with Saudi Arabia at the 2018 FIFA World Cup

Personal information
- Full name: Salman Mohammed; Mohammed Al-Faraj
- Date of birth: 1 August 1989 (age 37)
- Place of birth: Medina, Saudi Arabia
- Height: 1.80 m (5 ft 11 in)
- Position: Midfielder

Youth career
- 2004–2008: Al Hilal

Senior career*
Years	Team	Apps	(Gls)
2008–2024	Al Hilal	242	(17)
2024–2026	Neom	24	(0)

International career^{‡}
2011–2012	Saudi Arabia U23	2	(1)
2021	Saudi Arabia Olympic (wild-card)	3	(0)
2012–	Saudi Arabia	75	(9)
- * Club domestic league appearances and goals as of 17:01, 3 June 2026 (UTC) ‡ National team caps and goals as of 22:35, 31 March 2026 (UTC)

Salman Mohammed Mohammed Al-Faraj (Arabic: سَلْمَان مُحَمَّد مُحَمَّد الْفَرَج; born 1 August 1989) is a Saudi Arabian professional footballer who plays as a midfielder for the Saudi Arabia national team.

== Club career ==
=== Al Hilal ===
Al-Faraj was a one-club man of Al Hilal.

=== Neom ===
On July 28, 2024, Al-Faraj completed his transfer to Neom, a team in the Saudi First Division League.

== International career ==
Al-Faraj's first match with his national team was against Congo in an international friendly at Prince Abdullah bin Jalawi Stadium in al-Hasa, Saudi Arabia on 14 October 2012. The match ended in a 3–2 win. In December 2014, he was named in the Saudi squad for the 2015 AFC Asian Cup in Australia.

Salman's first goal with his national team was against Timor-Leste during the second round of the 2018 World Cup qualifiers at King Abdullah Sports City, in Jeddah, Saudi Arabia on 3 September 2015. The match ended in a 7–0 win.

In May 2018, he was named in Saudi Arabia's preliminary squad for the 2018 World Cup in Russia. On 4 June, Salman was included in 23-man squad for the World Cup. On 25 June, Salman scored the equalizing goal and his first ever World Cup goal from the penalty kick in a 2–1 victory over Egypt in their last group stage match of the tournament; it was Saudi Arabia's lone win in the tournament as the team crashed out of the group stage.

In June 2021, he assumed the role of captain for the national team at the 2020 Summer Olympics. Subsequently, in November 2022, he earned a spot in the 26-man squad for the 2022 World Cup in Qatar. However, under the coaching of Roberto Mancini, Al-Faraj was excluded from the squad for the 2023 AFC Asian Cup, reportedly due to off-field issues and frictions.

== Career statistics ==
=== Club ===
As of match played 31 May 2024

Club	Season	League		King Cup		Crown Prince Cup		Asia		Other		Total	
Club	Season	Apps	Goals	Apps	Goals	Apps	Goals	Apps	Goals	Apps	Goals	Apps	Goals
Al-Hilal	2008–09	4	0	1	0	0	0	0	0	—		5	0
Al-Hilal	2009–10	1	0	2	0	0	0	1	0	—		4	0
Al-Hilal	2010–11	10	0	0	0	0	0	1	0	—		11	0
Al-Hilal	2011–12	15	1	2	0	3	0	6	0	—		26	1
Al-Hilal	2012–13	22	3	2	0	3	0	9	1	—		36	4
Al-Hilal	2013–14	22	0	3	0	2	0	6	0	—		33	0
Al-Hilal	2014–15	20	2	5	1	4	2	13	1	—		42	6
Al-Hilal	2015–16	19	2	4	0	4	1	8	0	1 (Note: Appearances in Saudi Super Cup)	0	36	3
Al-Hilal	2016–17	17	2	2	0	3	0	8	0	1	0	31	2
Al-Hilal	2017–18	17	3	0	0	—		7	0	—		24	3
Al-Hilal	2018–19	8	2	0	0	—		0	0	2 (Note: One appearance in Arab Club Champions Cup, and one appearance in Saudi-Egyptian Super Cup)	0	10	2
Al-Hilal	2019–20	19	2	3	0	—		9	0	0	0	31	2
Al-Hilal	2020–21	17	0	1	0	—		0	0	1	0	19	0
Al-Hilal	2021–22	22	0	4	1	—		10	1	1 (Note: Appearances in FIFA Club World Cup) 1	0	38	2
Al-Hilal	2022–23	8	0	2	0	—		4	0	—		14	0
Al-Hilal	2023–24	21	0	2	0	—		8	0	—		31	0
Al-Hilal	Total	242	17	33	2	19	3	90	3	7	0	391	25
Career totals		242	17	33	2	19	3	90	3	7	0	391	25

=== International ===
As of match played 31 March 2026

Appearances and goals by national team and year
National team	Year	Apps	Goals
Saudi Arabia	2012	2	0
Saudi Arabia	2013	3	0
Saudi Arabia	2014	7	0
Saudi Arabia	2015	10	1
Saudi Arabia	2016	8	0
Saudi Arabia	2017	8	1
Saudi Arabia	2018	11	2
Saudi Arabia	2019	7	2
Saudi Arabia	2020	0	0
Saudi Arabia	2021	9	2
Saudi Arabia	2022	6	0
Saudi Arabia	2023	2	1
Saudi Arabia	2026	2	0
Total		75	9

Scores and results list Saudi Arabia's goal tally first, score column indicates score after each Al-Faraj goal.

List of international goals scored by Salman Al-Faraj
No.	Date	Venue	Opponent	Score	Result	Competition
1	3 September 2015	King Abdullah Sports City, Jeddah, Saudi Arabia	Timor-Leste	4–0	7–0	2018 FIFA World Cup qualification
2	7 October 2017	King Abdullah Sports City, Jeddah, Saudi Arabia	Jamaica	3–1	5–2	Friendly
3	9 May 2018	Estadio Ramón de Carranza, Cádiz, Spain	Algeria	1–0	2–0	Friendly
4	25 June 2018	Volgograd Arena, Volgograd, Russia	Egypt	1–1	2–1	2018 FIFA World Cup
5	14 November 2019	Pakhtakor Stadium, Tashkent, Uzbekistan	Uzbekistan	1–1	3–2	2022 FIFA World Cup qualification
6	14 November 2019	Pakhtakor Stadium, Tashkent, Uzbekistan	Uzbekistan	2–2	3–2	2022 FIFA World Cup qualification
7	15 June 2021	King Saud University Stadium, Riyadh, Saudi Arabia	Saudi Arabia	1–0	3–0	2022 FIFA World Cup qualification
8	15 June 2021	King Saud University Stadium, Riyadh, Saudi Arabia	Saudi Arabia	2–0	3–0	2022 FIFA World Cup qualification
9	13 October 2023	Estádio Municipal de Portimão, Portimão, Portugal	Nigeria	1–0	2–2	Friendly

== Honours ==
Al-Hilal

- Saudi Pro League, 2009–10, 2010–11, 2016–17, 2017–18, 2019–20, 2020–21, 2021–22, 2023–24
- King's Cup (Saudi Arabia): 2015, 2017, 2019–20, 2022–23, 2023–24
- Saudi Crown Prince Cup: 2008–09, 2009–10, 2010–11, 2011–12, 2012–13, 2015–16
- Saudi Super Cup: 2015, 2018, 2021, 2023
- AFC Champions League: 2019, 2021
