= Sayaf Al-Bishi =

Saudi Arabian footballer

Personal information
- Full name: Sayaf Dhefer Al-Bishi
- Date of birth: June 18, 1980 (age 46)
- Place of birth: Riyadh, Saudi Arabia
- Height: 1.78 m (5 ft 10 in)
- Position: Defender

Youth career
- Al-Ettifaq

Senior career*
Years	Team	Apps	(Gls)
2001–2012	Al-Ettifaq		
2012–2016	Al-Shabab	45	(3)
2016	Al-Raed	5	(1)
2016–2017	Al-Fateh	16	(1)
- * Club domestic league appearances and goals

Sayaf Al-Bishi (Arabic: سياف البيشي, born 18 June 1980) is a Saudi Arabian football player who plays as a defender.
