= Sultan Al-Bishi =

Saudi Arabian footballer

Personal information
- Full name: Sultan Al-Bishi
- Date of birth: January 28, 1990 (age 36)
- Place of birth: Saudi Arabia
- Height: 1.83 m (6 ft 0 in)
- Position: Right back

Team information
- Current team: Al-Waseel

Youth career
- 2003–2009: Al-Hilal

Senior career*
Years	Team	Apps	(Gls)
2008–2016	Al-Hilal	95	(3)
2015–2016	→ Al-Raed (loan)	16	(0)
2016–2018	Al-Faisaly	19	(0)
2018–2019	Al-Khaleej		
2019-2020	Al-Anwar		
2020–2022	Bisha		
2022	Al-Jubail		
2024–2025	Riyadh City		
2025	Al-Almin		
2025–	Al-Waseel		

International career
2012	Saudi Arabia	10	(0)
- * Club domestic league appearances and goals

Sultan Al-Bishi (Arabic: سلطان البيشي; born 28 January 1990) is a football player who plays for Al-Waseel as a right back. Al-Bishi started out his career at Al-Hilal where he spent 8 years before joining Al-Raed on loan. At the end of his loan spell, Al-Bishi was released and he subsequently joined Al-Faisaly.
