= Turki Al-Khudhayr =

Saudi Arabian football referee (born 1980)

- Full name: Turki Mohammed Al-Khudhayr
- Born: 1980 (age 45–46); Saudi Arabia

Domestic
Years	League	Role
2009–	Saudi Professional League	Referee

International
Years	League	Role
2014–	FIFA	Referee

Turki Mohammed Al-Khudayr (Arabic: تركي الخضير; born in 1980) is a Saudi Arabian football referee. He has refereed in the Saudi Professional League since 2009 and has been a full international referee for FIFA since 2014. He refereed at the 2019 AFC Asian Cup and also refereed the 2015 Saudi Crown Prince Cup Final.

== Career ==
On 17 March 2015, he was summoned to the 2018 FIFA World Cup qualification match in Russia during the match between Brunei and Chinese Taipei.

On 16 December 2019, after the match between Indian Super League clubs Bengaluru and Mumbai City FC (which Mumbai City FC won 3–2 against Bengaluru), Mumbai City FC coach, Jorge Costa of Portugal, has launched an allegation against Al-Khudayr for calling a Mumbai City FC player Sèrge Kevyn, of Gabon, with racist slurs as a “monkey” in Al-Khudayr's perspective of Anguoue making “disrespectful gestures”. On 17 December 2019, the allegations were reported to the All India Football Federation, and the federation will launch an investigation against Al-Khudayr. "The AIFF follows a zero toleration policy against racism and the complaint has been forwarded to the Disciplinary Committee to investigate into the matter and take appropriate action if found guilty," the AIFF stated.
