= 2008 Saudi Crown Prince Cup final =

- Event: 2007–08 Saudi Crown Prince Cup
Al-Hilal	Al-Ettifaq
2	0
- Date: 7 March 2008
- Venue: King Fahd International Stadium, Riyadh
- Referee: Thorsten Kinhöfer (Germany)

The 2008 Saudi Crown Prince Cup final was the 33rd final of the Crown Prince Cup. It took place on 7 March 2008 at the King Fahd International Stadium in Riyadh, Saudi Arabia and was contested between Al-Hilal and Al-Ettifaq. It was Al-Ettifaq's fourth Crown Prince Cup final and Al-Hilal's eighth. This was the first meeting between these two clubs in the final. It was Al-Ettifaq's first final since 2001 and Al-Hilal's third final in four years.

Al-Hilal won the match 2–0 to claim their seventh Crown Prince Cup title. It was also their third title in four years, following those in 2005 and 2006.

== Teams ==
Team	Previous finals appearances (bold indicates winners)
Al-Hilal	7 (**1964**, **1995**, 1999, **2000**, **2003**, **2005**, **2006**)
Al-Ettifaq	3 (1963, **1965**, 2001)

== Venue ==
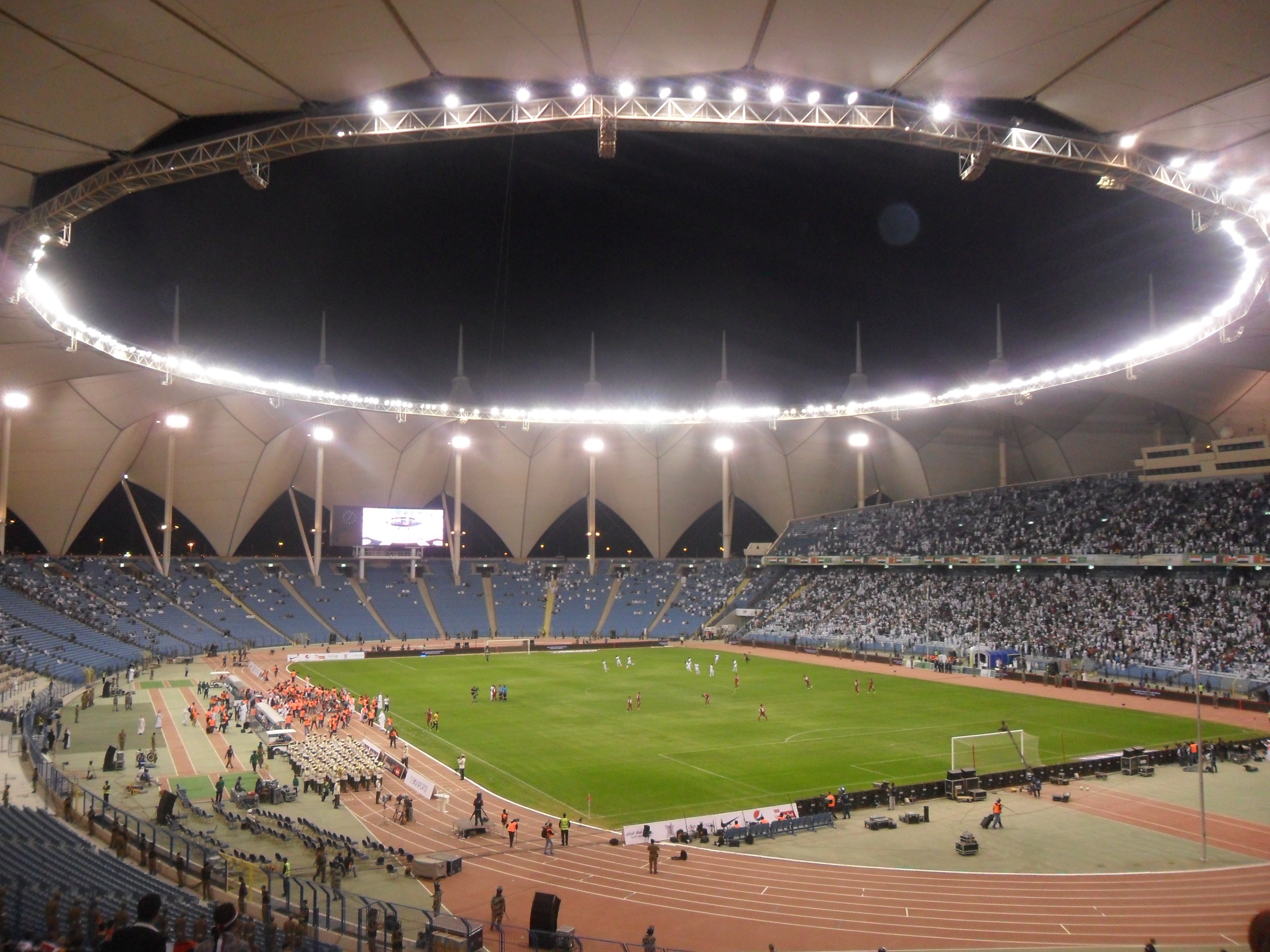
The King Fahd International Stadium in Riyadh hosted the final

The King Fahd International Stadium was announced as the host of the final venue. This was the eighth Crown Prince Cup final hosted in the King Fahd International Stadium following those in 1992, 1994, 1998, 2003, 2004, 2005, and 2006.

The King Fahd International Stadium was built in 1982 and was opened in 1987. The stadium was used as a venue for the 1992, 1995, and the 1997 editions of the FIFA Confederations Cup. Its current capacity is 68,752 and it is used by the Saudi Arabia national football team, Al-Nassr, Al-Shabab, and major domestic matches.

== Background ==
Al-Hilal reached their eighth final after a 1–0 aggregate win against Al-Shabab. This was Al-Hilal's third final in the four years.

Al-Ettifaq reached their fourth final, after a 4–3 aggregate win against defending champions Al-Ahli. They reached their first final since 2001 when they finished as runners-up losing to Al-Ittihad.

This was the first meeting between these two sides in the Crown Prince Cup final. The two teams met each other six times in the finals of other competitions, twice in the King Cup and four times in the Federation Cup. Al-Ettifaq won twice in the King Cup and once in the Federation Cup, while Al-Hilal 3 times in the Federation Cup. The two teams played each other four times in the season prior to the final, twice in the 2007 Gulf Club Champions Cup, once in the League and once in the Federation Cup. Al-Ettifaq defeated Al-Hilal 2–1 on aggregate in the semi-finals of the Gulf Club Champions Cup. Al-Hilal defeated Al-Ettifaq 2–0 in both the League and Federation Cup.

== Road to the final ==
Al-Hilal		Round	Al-Ettifaq
Opponent	Result		Opponent	Result
Al-Nassr	2–0 (H)	Round of 16	Al-Rabe'e	5–0 (H)
Al-Hazem	2–1 (a.e.t.) (H)	Quarter-finals	Al-Ittihad	2–1 (A)
Al-Shabab	0–0 (A)	Semi-finals	Al-Ahli	2–2 (A)
Al-Shabab	1–0 (H)	Semi-finals	Al-Ahli	2–1 (H)

Key: (H) = Home; (A) = Away

== Match ==
=== Details ===
7 March 2008
20:15 AST

Al-Hilal	2–0	Al-Ettifaq
Al-Qahtani 6'; El Taib 36' (pen.)	Report

King Fahd International Stadium, Riyadh
Referee: Thorsten Kinhöfer (Germany)

**Al-Hilal**	**Al-Ettifaq**

GK	1	(Saudi Arabia) Mohamed Al-Deayea (c)
RB	2	(Saudi Arabia) Khaled Al-Angari
CB	3	(Brazil) Marcelo Tavares	(yellow card) 73'
CB	29	(Saudi Arabia) Majed Al-Marshedi
LB	12	(Saudi Arabia) Abdulaziz Khathran
CM	6	(Saudi Arabia) Khaled Aziz
CM	13	(Saudi Arabia) Omar Al-Ghamdi	(yellow card) 81'
RW	15	(Saudi Arabia) Ahmed Al-Fraidi		(substituted off) 70'
AM	14	(Libya) Tarik El Taib	(yellow card) 27'	(substituted off) 88'
LW	10	(Saudi Arabia) Mohammad Al-Shalhoub		(substituted off) 90'
CF	20	(Saudi Arabia) Yasser Al-Qahtani
Substitutes:
MF	5	(Saudi Arabia) Abdulatif Al-Ghanam		(substituted on) 70'
MF	28	(Saudi Arabia) Fahed Al-Mobarak		(substituted on) 88'
FW	33	(Democratic Republic of the Congo) Lelo Mbele		(substituted on) 90'
Manager:
(Romania) Cosmin Olăroiu

GK	25	(Saudi Arabia) Adnan Al-Salman
RB	2	(Saudi Arabia) Rashed Al-Raheeb
CB	5	(Saudi Arabia) Sayaf Al-Bishi
CB	3	(Saudi Arabia) Jamaan Al-Jamaan
LB	15	(Saudi Arabia) Mishaal Al-Saeed	(yellow card) 34'
RM	21	(Saudi Arabia) Ibrahim Al-Moghanam		(substituted off) 58'
CM	28	(Senegal) Mohamed Roubize
CM	8	(Saudi Arabia) Ali Al-Shehri (c)
LM	30	(Morocco) Salaheddine Aqqal
CF	10	(Saudi Arabia) Saleh Bashir	(yellow card) 68'
CF	18	(Ghana) Prince Tagoe
Substitutes:
MF	7	(Saudi Arabia) Saad Al-Aboud		(substituted on) 58'
Manager:
(Portugal) Toni

**Match rules**

- 90 minutes.
- 30 minutes of extra-time if necessary.
- Penalty shoot-out if scores still level.
- Seven named substitutes.
- Maximum of three substitutions.

== See also ==
- 2007–08 Saudi Crown Prince Cup
- 2007–08 Saudi Premier League
