= 2008–09 Saudi Crown Prince Cup =

2008–09 Crown Prince Cup
Tournament details
- Country: Saudi Arabia
- Dates: 13 November 2008 – 27 February 2009
- Teams: 44 (all); 32 (qualifying competition); 16 (main competition)

Final positions
- Champions: Al-Hilal (8th title)
- Runners-up: Al-Shabab

Tournament statistics
- Matches played: 15
- Goals scored: 31 (2.07 per match)
- Top goal scorer(s): Mohammed Noor; Waleed Al-Gizani; Christian Wilhelmsson (2 goals each)
- All statistics correct as of 27 February 2009. (Note: All statistics do not include qualifying play-offs)

The 2008–09 Saudi Crown Prince Cup was the 34th season of the Saudi Crown Prince Cup since its establishment in 1957. This season's competition featured a total of 16 teams, 12 teams from the Pro League, and 4 teams from the qualifying rounds.

Pro League side Al-Hilal were the defending champions and successfully defended their title after a 1–0 win against Al-Shabab in the final. Al-Hilal won their eighth title to become the most successful team in the competition.

== Qualifying rounds ==
All of the competing teams that are not members of the Pro League competed in the qualifying rounds to secure one of 4 available places in the Round of 16. First Division sides Al-Fateh, Al-Riyadh and Al-Ansar qualified as well as Second Division side Al-Fayha.

=== First round ===
The first-round matches were played on 13 November 2008.

Home team (tier)	Score	Away team (tier)
Thursday 13 November 2008
Al-Qadisiyah (2)	3–1	Al-Alameen (4)
Al-Nahda (3)	3–3 (4–2 p)	Al-Khaleej (2)
Hajer (2)	0–3	Al-Jeel (3)
Al-Riyadh (2)	3–1	Al-Diriyah (3)
Al-Shoulla (3)	1–3	Sdoos (2)
Al-Faisaly (2)	5–0	Al-Qaisumah (3)
Al-Hamadah (3)	2–2 (4–5 p)	Al-Fayha (3)
Al-Najma (3)	3–2	Al-Batin (3)
Al-Taawoun (2)	2–1	Al-Mujazzal (3)
Al-Tai (2)	4–0	Al-Qotah (4)
Damac (2)	2–1	Al-Zaytoon (4)
Al-Orobah (2)	3–4	Al-Jabalain (3)
Hetten (2)	3–0	Al-Akhdoud (3)
Ohod (2)	4–0	Al-Suqoor (4)
Al-Rabe'e (3)	0–3	Al-Ansar (2)
Al-Fateh (2)	2–2 (6–5 p)	Al-Adalah (3)

=== Second round ===
The second-round matches were played on 27 & 28 November 2008.

Home team (tier)	Score	Away team (tier)
Thursday 27 November 2008
Al-Qadisiyah (2)	4–2	Al-Nahda (3)
Al-Taawoun (2)	1–0	Al-Faisaly (2)
Al-Ansar (2)	1–0	Ohod (2)
Al-Fateh (2)	3–2	Al-Jeel (3)
Al-Fayha (3)	1–1 (5–4 p)	Al-Najma (3)
Damac (2)	3–5 (a.e.t.)	Hetten (2)
Sdoos (2)	0–3	Al-Riyadh (2)
Friday 28 November 2008
Al-Jabalain (3)	3–2	Al-Tai (2)

=== Final Round ===
The Final Round matches were played on 2 December 2008.

Home team (tier)	Score	Away team (tier)
Tuesday 2 December 2008
Al-Qadisiyah (2)	0–0 (4–5 p)	Al-Fateh (2)
Al-Taawoun (2)	3–4	Al-Riyadh (2)
Al-Jabalain (3)	0–1	Al-Fayha (3)
Hetten (2)	2–2 (3–4 p)	Al-Ansar (2)

== Bracket ==
Round of 16
A	Al-Shabab	2
H	Abha	1
A	Al-Ahli	1
H	Al-Fateh	2
A	Al-Ettifaq	3
H	Al-Riyadh	0
H	Al-Hazem	1
A	Najran	0
H	Al-Ittihad	3
A	Al-Raed	1
H	Al-Nassr	2
A	Al-Fayha	0
A	Al-Hilal	2
H	Al-Watani	0
A	Al-Wehda	1
H	Al-Ansar	0

Quarter-finals
A	Al-Shabab	2
H	Al-Fateh	0
A	Al-Ettifaq	0
H	Al-Hazem	2
H	Al-Ittihad	1 (3)
A	Al-Nassr (p)	1 (5)
A	Al-Hilal	1
H	Al-Wehda	0

Semi-finals
A	Al-Shabab	3
H	Al-Hazem	1
A	Al-Nassr	0
H	Al-Hilal	1

Final
–	Al-Shabab	0
–	Al-Hilal (a.e.t.)	1

Note: H: Home team, A: Away team

== Round of 16 ==
The Round of 16 fixtures were played on 13, 14 and 15 February 2009. All times are local, AST (UTC+3).

13 February 2009 4	Al-Hazem (1)	1–0	Najran (1)	Ar Rass
20:15	Munawer 31'	Report		Stadium: Al-Hazem Club Stadium; Referee: Dhafer Abo Zanda

14 February 2009 2	Al-Fateh (2)	2–1	Al-Ahli (1)	Al-Hasa
15:30	Al-Eid 61'; Al-Dobaini 83' (pen.)	Report	Hazzazi 90+3'	Stadium: Prince Abdullah bin Jalawi Stadium; Referee: Fahad Al-Mirdasi

14 February 2009 1	Abha (1)	1–2	Al-Shabab (1)	Abha
20:15	Al-Yami 19'	Report	Camacho 26' (pen.); Al-Qadi 55'	Stadium: Prince Sultan bin Abdul Aziz Stadium; Referee: Yehya Hazazi

14 February 2009 3	Al-Riyadh (2)	0–3	Al-Ettifaq (1)	Riyadh
20:15		Report	Tagoe 25'; Aqqal 63'; Al-Qahtani 90+2'	Stadium: Prince Faisal bin Fahd Stadium; Referee: Saleh Al-Aqeel

14 February 2009 6	Al-Nassr (1)	2–0	Al-Fayha (3)	Riyadh
20:15	Élton 34'; Ghaly 88' (pen.)	Report		Stadium: King Fahd International Stadium; Referee: Abbas Ibrahim

14 February 2009 8	Al-Ansar (2)	0–1	Al-Wehda (1)	Medina
20:15		Report	Harison 79'	Stadium: Prince Mohammed bin Abdul Aziz Stadium; Referee: Abdulaziz Al-Fonaital

15 February 2009 5	Al-Ittihad (1)	3–1	Al-Raed (1)	Jeddah
20:15	Al-Sherif 25' (o.g.); Noor 70'; Renato Cajá 79'	Report	Abdulhameed 7'	Stadium: Prince Abdullah Al Faisal Stadium; Referee: Abdulrahman Al-Qahtani

15 February 2009 7	Al-Watani (1)	0–2	Al-Hilal (1)	Tabuk
20:15		Report	Al-Qahtani 72'; Wilhelmsson 90'	Stadium: King Khalid Sport City Stadium; Referee: Marai Al-Awaji

== Quarter-finals ==
The quarter-finals fixtures were played on 18 and 19 February 2009. All times are local, AST (UTC+3).

18 February 2009 9	Al-Fateh (2)	0–1	Al-Shabab (1)	Al-Hasa
20:20		Report	Ajab 68'	Stadium: Prince Abdullah bin Jalawi Stadium; Referee: Mamdouh Al-Mirdas

18 February 2009 10	Al-Hazem (1)	2–0	Al-Ettifaq (1)	Ar Rass
20:20	Majrashi 14'; Al-Gizani 64' (pen.)	Report		Stadium: Al-Hazem Club Stadium; Referee: Khalil Al-Ghamdi

19 February 2009 11	Al-Ittihad (1)	1–1 (a.e.t.) (3–5 p)	Al-Nassr (1)	Jeddah
20:20	Noor 118'	Report	Belal 114'	Stadium: Prince Abdullah Al Faisal Stadium; Referee: Kyros Vassaras (Greece)
	Penalties
	Renato Cajá (penalty scored); Noor (penalty scored); Al-Saqri (penalty scored); Moteab (penalty missed)		(penalty scored) Ghaly; (penalty scored) Élton; (penalty scored) Al-Waked; (penalty scored) Éder; (penalty scored) Barnawi

19 February 2009 12	Al-Wehda (1)	0–1	Al-Hilal (1)	Mecca
20:20		Report	Hawsawi 39'	Stadium: King Abdul Aziz Stadium; Referee: Abdulrahman Al-Amri

== Semi-finals ==
The semi-finals fixtures were played on 22 and 23 February 2009. All times are local, AST (UTC+3).

22 February 2009 13	Al-Hazem (1)	1–3	Al-Shabab (1)	Ar Rass
20:20	Al-Gizani 56' (pen.)	Report	Otaif 7'; Al-Shamrani 69' (pen.); Muath 73'	Stadium: Al-Hazem Club Stadium; Referee: Sascha Kever (Switzerland)

23 February 2009 14	Al-Hilal (1)	1–0	Al-Nassr (1)	Riyadh
20:20	Wilhelmsson 7'	Report		Stadium: King Fahd International Stadium; Referee: Claudio Circhetta (Switzerland)

== Final ==
The final was held on 27 February 2009 in the King Fahd International Stadium in Riyadh. All times are local, AST (UTC+3).

27 February 2009
20:15

Al-Shabab	0–1 (a.e.t.)	Al-Hilal
	Report	Al-Mofarij 113'

King Fahd International Stadium, Riyadh
Referee: Éric Poulat (France)

=== Winner ===
2008–09 Crown Prince Cup
Winners
Al-Hilal
8th Title

== Top goalscorers ==
As of 27 February 2009

Rank	Player	Club	Goals
1	(Saudi Arabia) Mohammed Noor	Al-Ittihad	2
1	(Saudi Arabia) Waleed Al-Gizani	Al-Hazem	2
1	(Sweden) Christian Wilhelmsson	Al-Hilal	2

== See also ==
- 2008–09 Saudi Professional League
- 2009 King Cup of Champions
