= 2011–12 Saudi Crown Prince Cup =

2011–12 Crown Prince Cup
Tournament details
- Country: Saudi Arabia
- Dates: 19 October 2011 – 10 February 2012
- Teams: 64 (all); 50 (qualifying competition); 16 (main competition)

Final positions
- Champions: Al-Hilal (11th title)
- Runners-up: Al-Ettifaq

Tournament statistics
- Matches played: 15
- Goals scored: 43 (2.87 per match)
- Top goal scorer(s): Nawaf Al-Abed; Yoo Byung-soo (4 goals each)
- (Note: All statistics do not include qualifying play-offs)

The 2011–12 Saudi Crown Prince Cup was the 37th season of the Saudi Crown Prince Cup since its establishment in 1957. This season's competition featured a total of 16 teams, 14 teams from the Pro League, and 2 teams from the Qualifying Rounds.

Al-Hilal won their fifth Crown Prince Cup title in a row and eleventh in total after defeating Al-Ettifaq 2–1 in the final.

== Qualifying rounds ==
All of the competing teams that are not members of the Pro League competed in the qualifying rounds to secure one of 2 available places in the Round of 16. First Division sides Al-Shoulla and Al-Tai qualified.

=== First round ===
The First Round matches were played on 19, 20, & 21 October 2011.

| Home team (tier) | Score | Away team (tier) |
Wednesday 19 October 2011
| Al-Wehda (2) | 4–2 | Al-Rabe'e (3) |
| Damac (2) | 0–1 | Al-Nakheel (3) |
| Hetten (2) | 1–1 (4–3 p) | Al-Akhdoud (3) |
| Al-Shoulla (2) | 3–0 | Sdoos (3) |
| Al-Jeel (2) | 2–0 | Al-Sawab (4) |
Thursday 20 October 2011
| Al-Riyadh (2) | 0–3 | Al-Diriyah (3) |
| Al-Hazem (2) | 1–2 | Al-Oyoon (3) |
| Al-Nahda (2) | 2–1 | Al-Taraji (3) |
| Al-Suqoor (2) | 3–0 | Al-Taqadom (3) |
| Al-Khaleej (2) | 0–2 | Al-Safa (3) |
| Abha (2) | 3–5 | Al-Hejaz (4) |
Friday 21 October 2011
| Al-Tai (2) | 2–1 | Al-Najma (3) |
| Al-Watani (2) | 3–0 | Al-Hait (4) |
| Al-Batin (2) | 1–1 (4–5 p) | Al-Hamadah (3) |
| Ohod (2) | 2–0 | Al-Arabi (3) |
| Al-Orobah (2) | 1–2 | Al-Rima (3) |

=== Second round ===
The Second Round matches were played on 31 October and 1 November 2011.

| Home team (tier) | Score | Away team (tier) |
Monday 31 October 2011
| Al-Wehda (2) | 11–0 | Al-Hejaz (4) |
| Al-Diriyah (3) | 2–3 | Al-Shoulla (2) |
| Al-Safa (3) | 2–1 | Al-Jeel (2) |
| Al-Oyoon (3) | 1–1 (5–6 p) | Al-Nahda (2) |
| Hetten (2) | 1–0 | Al-Nakheel (3) |
Tuesday 1 November 2011
| Al-Tai (2) | 3–0 | Al-Hamadah (3) |
| Ohod (2) | 0–0 (8–7 p) | Al-Suqoor (2) |
| Al-Rima (3) | 1–2 | Al-Watani (2) |

=== Third round ===
The Third Round matches were played on 20 November 2011.

| Home team (tier) | Score | Away team (tier) |
Sunday 20 November 2011
| Hetten (2) | 0–3 | Al-Wehda (2) |
| Al-Shoulla (2) | 4–3 (a.e.t.) | Al-Safa (3) |
| Al-Watani (2) | 1–2 | Ohod (2) |
| Al-Tai (2) | 2–1 | Al-Nahda (2) |

=== Final round ===
The Final Round matches were played on 4 December 2011.

| Home team (tier) | Score | Away team (tier) |
Sunday 4 December 2011
| Al-Shoulla (2) | 1–1 (4–3 p) | Al-Wehda (2) |
| Ohod (2) | 1–2 (a.e.t.) | Al-Tai (2) |

== Bracket ==
Round of 16
A | Al-Hilal | 6
H | Al-Shoulla | 1
A | Al-Nassr (pen.) | 0 (8)
H | Al-Fateh | 0 (7)
H | Al-Ittihad | 4
A | Al-Raed | 0
A | Al-Faisaly | 2
H | Al-Tai | 1
H | Al-Shabab | 2
A | Al-Qadisiyah | 1
A | Al-Ahli | 3
H | Hajer | 0
H | Al-Ettifaq | 2
A | Al-Ansar | 0
H | Al-Taawoun | 1
A | Najran | 2

Quarter-finals
H | Al-Hilal | 4
A | Al-Nassr | 1
H | Al-Ittihad | 1
A | Al-Faisaly | 0
H | Al-Shabab | 0
A | Al-Ahli | 1
H | Al-Ettifaq | 3
A | Najran | 0

Semi-finals
H | Al-Hilal | 2
A | Al-Ittihad | 0
H | Al-Ahli | 1
A | Al-Ettifaq | 2

Final
– | Al-Hilal | 2
– | Al-Ettifaq | 1

Note: H: Home team, A: Away team

== Round of 16 ==
The Round of 16 fixtures were played on 20 and 21 December 2011. All times are local, AST (UTC+3).

| 20 December 2011 2 | Al-Fateh (1) | 0–0 (a.e.t.) (7–8 p) | Al-Nassr (1) | Al-Hasa |
| 19:40 | | Report | | Stadium: Al-Fateh Club Stadium; Referee: Mutraf Al-Qahtani |
| | Penalties |
| | Al-Nakhli (penalty scored); Kabi (penalty missed); Al-Mogahwi (penalty scored); Sufyani (penalty missed); Al-Dosari (penalty scored); Fuakumputu (penalty scored); Al-Hamdan (penalty scored); Cissokho (penalty scored); Hagawi (penalty scored); Hash'hash (penalty missed) | | (penalty missed) Abdulghani; (penalty scored) Mouath; (penalty scored) Al-Bishi; (penalty missed) Hawsawi; (penalty scored) Ghaleb; (penalty scored) Barnawi; (penalty scored) Dibesh; (penalty scored) Al-Zylaeei; (penalty scored) Al-Nassar; (penalty scored) Al-Enezi |

| 20 December 2011 4 | Al-Tai (2) | 1–2 | Al-Faisaly (1) | Ha'il |
| 19:40 | Al-Juhaim 3' | Report | Rasan 38'; Jertec 75' | Stadium: Prince Abdul Aziz bin Musa'ed Stadium; Referee: Marai Al-Awaji |

| 20 December 2011 5 | Al-Shabab (1) | 2–1 | Al-Qadisiyah (1) | Riyadh |
| 19:40 | Fallatah 81'; Al-Shamrani 90+2' (pen.) | Report | Agba 41' | Stadium: Prince Faisal bin Fahd Stadium; Referee: Abdulaziz Al-Fonaital |

| 20 December 2011 7 | Al-Ettifaq (1) | 2–0 | Al-Ansar (1) | Dammam |
| 19:40 | Bashir 15'; Tagliabué 63' | Report | | Stadium: Prince Mohamed bin Fahd Stadium; Referee: Turki Al-Khudhayr |

| 21 December 2011 1 | Al-Shoulla (2) | 1–6 | Al-Hilal (1) | Al-Kharj |
| 19:40 | Al-Bishi 90+1' | Report | Byung-Soo 8', 41'; Al-Shalhoub 26'; Al-Mehyani 32'; Al-Abed 45', 72' | Stadium: Al-Shoulla Club Stadium; Referee: Mishari Al-Mishari |

| 21 December 2011 3 | Al-Ittihad (1) | 4–0 | Al-Raed (1) | Jeddah |
| 19:40 | Hazazi 2', 70'; Noor 34' (pen.); Paulo Jorge 47' (pen.) | Report | | Stadium: Prince Abdullah Al Faisal Stadium; Referee: Mohammed Al-Hoaish |

| 21 December 2011 6 | Hajer (1) | 0–3 | Al-Ahli (1) | Al-Hasa |
| 19:40 | | Report | Al-Fahmi 19', 80'; Al-Jassim 86' (pen.) | Stadium: Prince Abdullah bin Jalawi Stadium; Referee: Mohammed Al-Nuhait |

| 21 December 2011 8 | Al-Taawoun (1) | 1–2 | Najran (1) | Buraidah |
| 19:40 | Al-Hussain 89' | Report | Al-Hussain 17' (pen.); Mefleh 23' | Stadium: King Abdullah Sport City Stadium; Referee: Abdulrahman Al-Ahmari |

== Quarter-finals ==
The quarter-finals fixtures were played on 23 and 24 January 2012. All times are local, AST (UTC+3).

| 23 January 2012 9 | Al-Hilal (1) | 4–1 | Al-Nassr (1) | Riyadh |
| 20:05 | Hawsawi 4' (o.g.); Al-Shalhoub 22' (pen.); Al-Dawsari 24'; Byung-Soo 50' | Report | Al-Sahlawi 60' | Stadium: Prince Faisal bin Fahd Stadium; Referee: Anastasios Sidiropoulos (Greece) |

| 23 January 2012 10 | Al-Ittihad (1) | 1–0 | Al-Faisaly (1) | Jeddah |
| 20:05 | Abousaban 74' | Report | | Stadium: Prince Abdullah Al Faisal Stadium; Referee: Mohammed Al-Hoaish |

| 24 January 2012 11 | Al-Shabab (1) | 0–1 | Al-Ahli (1) | Riyadh |
| 20:00 | | Report | Al-Hosni 90+3' | Stadium: Prince Faisal bin Fahd Stadium; Referee: Ilias Spathas (Greece) |

| 24 January 2012 12 | Al-Ettifaq (1) | 3–0 | Najran (1) | Dammam |
| 20:00 | Al-Salem 10'; Tagliabué 53'; Al-Shehri 64' | Report | | Stadium: Prince Mohamed bin Fahd Stadium; Referee: Marai Al-Awaji |

== Semi-finals ==
The semi-finals fixtures were played on 27 and 28 January 2012. All times are local, AST (UTC+3).

| 27 January 2012 13 | Al-Hilal (1) | 2–0 | Al-Ittihad (1) | Riyadh |
| 20:05 | Byung-Soo 14'; Al-Abed 72' | Report | | Stadium: King Fahd International Stadium; Referee: Alexandru Tudor (Romania) |

| 28 January 2012 14 | Al-Ahli (1) | 1–2 | Al-Ettifaq (1) | Jeddah |
| 20:05 | Al-Hosni 71' | Report | Al-Hamed 22'; Tagliabué 90+5' (pen.) | Stadium: Prince Abdullah Al Faisal Stadium; Referee: Cristian Balaj (Romania) |

== Final ==
The final was held on 10 February 2012 in the King Fahd International Stadium in Riyadh. All times are local, AST (UTC+3).

10 February 2012
20:25

| Al-Hilal | 2–1 | Al-Ettifaq |
|---|---|---|
| Wilhelmsson 9'; Al-Abed 21' | Report | Al-Shehri 35' |

King Fahd International Stadium, Riyadh
Referee: Nicola Rizzoli (Italy)

=== Winner ===
2011–12 Crown Prince Cup
Winners
Al-Hilal
11th Title

== Top goalscorers ==
Updated 10 February 2012

| Rank | Player | Club | Goals |
|---|---|---|---|
| 1 | (Saudi Arabia) Nawaf Al-Abed | Al-Hilal | 4 |
| 1 | (South Korea) Yoo Byung-Soo | Al-Hilal | 4 |
| 3 | (Argentina) Sebastián Tagliabué | Al-Ettifaq | 3 |
| 4 | (Oman) Amad Al Hosni | Al-Ahli | 2 |
| 4 | (Saudi Arabia) Naif Hazazi | Al-Ittihad | 2 |
| 4 | (Saudi Arabia) Mohammad Al-Shalhoub | Al-Hilal | 2 |
| 4 | (Saudi Arabia) Yasser Al-Fahmi | Al-Ahli | 2 |
| 4 | (Saudi Arabia) Yahya Al-Shehri | Al-Ettifaq | 2 |
