= Marai Al-Awaji =

Saudi professional football referee

Marai Mohammed Al Awaji
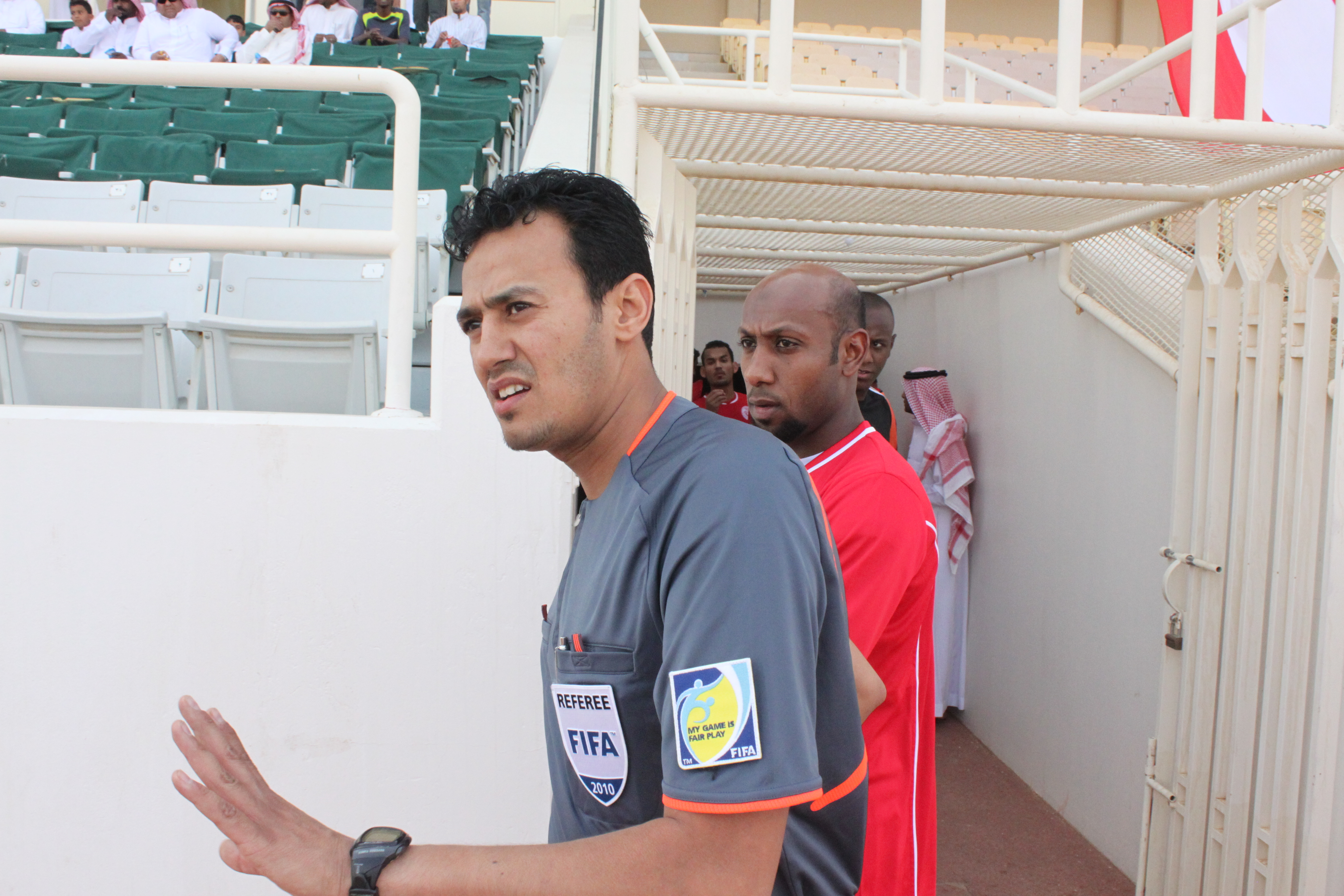
- Full name: Marai Al-Awaji
- Born: 31 July 1973 (age 53); Saudi Arabia

Domestic
Years	League	Role

International
Years	League	Role
2010–	FIFA listed	Referee
2010	Polish Super Cup (UEFA)	Referee

Marai Al Awaji (Arabic: مرعي العواجي; born 31 July 1973) is a Saudi professional football referee. He has been a full international for FIFA since 2010. He refereed some matches in AFC Champions League. He was a referee during the 2010 Polish Super Cup.
