= 2010–11 Al-Hilal FC season =

Al-Hilal
2010–11 season
- President: (Saudi Arabia) Abdulrahman bin Musa'ad
- Manager: (Belgium) Eric Gerets (until 5 November 2010) (Argentina) Gabriel Calderon (From 13 November 2010) (Saudi Arabia) Sami Al-Jaber (From 30 June 2011)
- Stadium: King Fahd Stadium; Prince Faisal bin Fahd Stadium
- SPL: 1st
- Crown Prince Cup: Winners
- King Cup of Champions: Semi-finals
- AFC Champions League: 2010: Semi-finals; 2011: Round of 16
- Top goalscorer: League: Yasser Al-Qahtani (11); All: Yasser Al-Qahtani (18)
- Highest home attendance: 68,752 vs Zob Ahan (20 October 2010, AFC Champions League)
- Lowest home attendance: 3,968 vs Al-Hazm (15 December 2010, Pro League)
- Average home league attendance: 8,736
Home colours	Away colours

The 2010–11 Al-Hilal FC season was Al-Hilal Saudi Football Club's 54th in existence and 35th consecutive season in the top flight of Saudi Arabian football. Along with Pro League, the club participated in the AFC Champions League, Crown Prince Cup, and the King Cup.

== Players ==
=== Squad information ===
Players and squad numbers.
Note: Flags indicate national team as has been defined under FIFA eligibility rules. Players may hold more than one non-FIFA nationality.

No.	Nat.	Position	Name	Date of birth (age)
Goalkeepers
28	(Saudi Arabia)	GK	Abdullah Al-Sudairy	2 February 1992 (aged 19)
30	(Saudi Arabia)	GK	Hassan Al-Otaibi	16 October 1977 (aged 33)
22	(Saudi Arabia)	GK	Fahad Al-Shamri	5 May 1981 (aged 30)
Defenders
2	(Saudi Arabia)	RB	Sultan Al-Bishi	28 January 1990 (aged 21)
34	(Saudi Arabia)	CB	Shafi Al-Dossari	1 February 1990 (aged 21)
4	(Saudi Arabia)	LB / CB	Abdullah Al-Zori	13 August 1987 (aged 23)
12	(South Korea)	LB / RB	Lee Young-pyo	23 April 1977 (aged 34)
25	(Saudi Arabia)	CB	Majed Al Marshadi	1 November 1984 (aged 26)
19	(Saudi Arabia)	CB	Mohammad Nami	7 January 1982 (aged 29)
23	(Saudi Arabia)	CB	Hassan Khairat	8 March 1986 (aged 25)
3	(Saudi Arabia)	CB	Osama Hawsawi	31 March 1984 (aged 29)
Midfielders
27	(Saudi Arabia)	DM / CM	Mohammed Al-Qarni	24 November 1989 (aged 21)
5	(Saudi Arabia)	CM / AM	Abdulatif Al-Ghanam	16 July 1985 (aged 25)
15	(Saudi Arabia)	RM	Ahmed Al-Fraidi	29 January 1988 (aged 23)
10	(Saudi Arabia)	AM / LW	Mohammad Al-Shalhoub	8 December 1980 (aged 30)
11	(Saudi Arabia)	AM / LM	Abdullaziz Al-Dawsari	11 October 1988 (aged 22)
13	(Saudi Arabia)	AM / LM / LW	Salman Al-Faraj (C)	8 January 1989 (aged 22)
21	(Saudi Arabia)	CM	Sultan Al-Bargan	17 April 1983 (aged 28)
24	(Saudi Arabia)	LM / RM	Nawaf Al-Abed	26 January 1990 (aged 21)
9	(Sweden)	RM	Christian Wilhelmsson	8 December 1979 (aged 31)
8	(Romania)	RM	Mirel Rădoi	22 March 1981 (aged 30)
Forwards
18	(Egypt)	ST / CF	Ahmed Ali	21 May 1986 (aged 25)
14	(Saudi Arabia)	ST / CF	Waleed Al-Gizani	26 February 1981 (aged 30)
16	(Saudi Arabia)	RW	Essa Al-Mehyani	22 June 1983 (aged 28)
20	(Saudi Arabia)	ST / CF	Yasser Al-Qahtani	11 October 1982 (aged 28)

== Competitions ==
=== Overall ===
Competition	Started round	Final position / round	First match	Last match
Pro League	Round 1	Champions	15 August 2010	20 May 2011
2010 ACL	Quarter-finals	Semi-finals	15 September 2010	20 October 2010
Crown Prince Cup	Round of 16	Winners	1 February 2011	15 April 2011
2011 ACL	Group stage	Round of 16	1 March 2011	24 May 2011
King Cup of Champions	Quarter-finals	Semi-finals	28 May 2011	23 June 2011

=== Overview ===
Competition	Record							
Competition	Pld	W	D	L	GF	GA	GD	Win %
Pro League	26	19	7	0	52	18	+34	73.08
King Cup of Champions	5	3	1	1	12	8	+4	60.00
Crown Prince Cup	4	4	0	0	13	2	+11	100.00
2010 ACL	4	1	0	3	5	6	−1	25.00
2011 ACL	7	4	1	2	12	9	+3	57.14
Total	46	31	9	6	94	43	+51	67.39

Source: Competitions

=== Pro League ===
==== League table ====
Pos	Team	Pld	W	D	L	GF	GA	GD	Pts	Qualification or relegation
1	Al-Hilal (C)	26	19	7	0	52	18	+34	64	AFC Champions League group stage
2	Al-Ittihad	26	13	12	1	49	23	+26	51	AFC Champions League group stage
3	Al-Ettifaq	26	15	3	8	45	30	+15	48	AFC Champions League qualifying play-off
4	Al-Shabab	26	13	7	6	42	30	+12	46	
5	Al-Nassr	26	11	10	5	44	34	+10	43	

Source: slstat.com
Rules for classification: 1) Points; 2) Head-to-head points; 3) Head-to-head goal difference; 4) Total goal difference; 5) Total goals scored; 6) Play-off (only for deciding champion, relegation and AFC competitions participation).
(C) Champions

==== Results summary ====
Overall								Home						Away					
Pld	W	D	L	GF	GA	GD	Pts	W	D	L	GF	GA	GD	W	D	L	GF	GA	GD
26	19	7	0	52	18	+34	64	9	4	0	24	9	+15	10	3	0	28	9	+19

Source: Competitive matches

==== Results by round ====
Round	1	2	3	4	5	6	7	8	9	10	11	12	13	14	15	16	17	18	19	20	21	22	23	24	25	26
Ground	H	A	H	A	H	H	A	H	H	A	A	H	H	A	A	H	A	A	A	H	A	H	A	H	A	H
Result	W	W	W	W	W	D	W	D	D	W	D	W	W	W	D	W	W	W	D	D	W	W	W	W	W	W
Position	5	4	1	1	1	2	2	2	1	1	1	1	1	1	1	1	1	1	1	1	1	1	1	1	1	1

Source: Competitive matches
A = Away; H = Home; W = Win; D = Draw; L = Loss

==== Matches ====
15 August 2010 1	Al-Hilal	1–0	Al-Taawoun	Riyadh
22:00 (UTC+03:00)	Al-Ghanam 8'	Report		Stadium: King Fahad International Stadium; Attendance: 6,596; Referee: Fahad Al-Oraini

20 August 2010 2	Al-Hazm	0–2	Al-Hilal	Ar Rass
22:15 (UTC+03:00)		Report	22' Al-Mehyani; 87' (pen.) Neves	Stadium: Al Hazm Club Stadium; Attendance: 2,413; Referee: Abdulrahman Al-Amri

25 August 2010 3	Al-Hilal	5–1	Al-Faisaly	Riyadh
22:00 (UTC+03:00)	Radoi 59'; Al-Qahtani 62', 86', 88'; Wilhelmsson 64'	Report	66' Ayan	Stadium: Prince Faisal bin Fahd Stadium; Attendance: 7,589; Referee: Abdelrahman Al-Qahtani

29 August 2010 4	Al-Wehda	1–3	Al-Hilal	Makkah
22:15 (UTC+03:00)	Barnawi 13'	Report	25' Wilhelmsson; 30' Al-Qahtani; 69' Al-Mehyani	Stadium: King Abdul Aziz Stadium; Attendance: 6,244; Referee: Fahad Al-Oraini

1 October 2010 5	Al-Hilal	1–0	Al-Ettifaq	Riyadh
20:05 (UTC+03:00)	Wilhelmsson 2'	Report		Stadium: King Fahad International Stadium; Attendance: 6,964; Referee: Abdulrahman Al-Amri

24 October 2010 6	Al-Hilal	1–1	Al-Nassr	Riyadh
19:50 (UTC+03:00)	Al-Mehyani 62'	Report	19' (pen.) Al-Qahtani	Stadium: King Fahad International Stadium; Attendance: 18,058; Referee: Perez Antonio

28 October 2010 7	Al-Raed	0–4	Al-Hilal	Buraidah
19:45 (UTC+03:00)		Report	62' Hawsawi; 66', 73' Neves; 89' Al-Shalhoub	Stadium: King Abdullah Sport City Stadium; Attendance: 13,592; Referee: Fahad Al-Oraini

2 November 2010 8	Al-Hilal	0–0	Al-Qadisiyah	Riyadh
19:40 (UTC+03:00)		Report		Stadium: Prince Faisal bin Fahd Stadium; Attendance: 6,620; Referee: Meree Al-Awagi

7 November 2010 9	Al-Hilal	3–3	Al-Ahli	Riyadh
19:45 (UTC+03:00)	Neves 9'; Al-Mehyani 47'; Radoi 56'	Report	5' Al-Hosni; 61', 63' Simoes	Stadium: Prince Faisal bin Fahd Stadium; Attendance: 7,715; Referee: Circhetta Claudio

11 November 2010 10	Najran	0–3	Al-Hilal	Najran
19:35 (UTC+03:00)		Report	27' (pen.) Radoi; 77' Al-Fraidi; 94' Al-Dawsari	Stadium: Al Akhdoud Club Stadium; Attendance: 368; Referee: Fahad Al-Mirdasi

10 December 2010 11	Al-Taawoun	2–2	Al-Hilal	Buraidah
19:35 (UTC+03:00)	Kurtisi 62' (pen.); Al-Rashid 86' (pen.)	Report	10' Al-Qahtani; 17' Radoi	Stadium: King Abdullah Sport City Stadium; Attendance: 11,220; Referee: Saad Al-Kathiri

15 December 2010 12	Al-Hilal	3–0	Al-Hazm	Riyadh
19:40 (UTC+03:00)	Al-Qahtani 84', 88' (pen.), 93'	Report		Stadium: Prince Faisal bin Fahd Stadium; Attendance: 3,968; Referee: Yahya Hazzazi

19 December 2010 13	Al-Hilal	2–0	Al-Fateh	Riyadh
19:40 (UTC+03:00)	Neves 78'; Al-Qahtani 85' (pen.)	Report		Stadium: Prince Faisal bin Fahd Stadium; Attendance: 4,375; Referee: Meree Al-Awagi

23 December 2010 14	Al-Faisaly	2–3	Al-Hilal	Al Majma'ah
19:40 (UTC+03:00)	Ayan 32'; Memelli 51'	Report	37' (o.g.) Al-Mubarak; 72' Neves; 77' Al-Qahtani	Stadium: King Salman Sport City Stadium; Attendance: 5,022; Referee: Khalil Jalal

6 February 2011 15	Al-Ittihad	0–0	Al-Hilal	Jeddah
20:15 (UTC+03:00)		Report		Stadium: Prince Abdullah Al Faisal Stadium; Attendance: 14,425; Referee: Jerome Efong

12 February 2011 16	Al-Hilal	2–1	Al-Wehda	Riyadh
20:15 (UTC+03:00)	Al-Abed 22'; Wilhelmsson 62'	Report	90' Kaddioui	Stadium: Prince Faisal bin Fahd Stadium; Attendance: 5,119; Referee: Sami Al-Nemri

21 February 2011 17	Al-Shabab	0–2	Al-Hilal	Riyadh
20:15 (UTC+03:00)		Report	10' Al-Abed; 72' (pen.) Al-Shalhoub	Stadium: Prince Faisal bin Fahd Stadium; Attendance: 7,997; Referee: Istvan Vad

25 February 2011 18	Al-Fateh	1–2	Al-Hilal	Al-Hasa
20:20 (UTC+03:00)	Ahmed Ali 77'	Report	16' Radoi; 94' Al-Marshadi	Stadium: Prince Abdullah bin Jalawi Stadium; Attendance: 9,281; Referee: Fahad Al-Oraini

6 March 2011 19	Al-Ahli	1–1	Al-Hilal	Jeddah
20:25 (UTC+03:00)	Al-Hosni 54'	Report	59' Wilhelmsson	Stadium: Prince Abdullah Al Faisal Stadium; Attendance: 15,715; Referee: Drachta Oliver

20 March 2011 20	Al-Hilal	0–0	Al-Ittihad	Riyadh
20:30 (UTC+03:00)		Report		Stadium: King Fahd International Stadium; Attendance: 19,212; Referee: Haenni Nikolaj

1 April 2011 21	Al-Ettifaq	2–3	Al-Hilal	Dammam
20:35 (UTC+03:00)	Al-Shehri 8'; Tagliabué 20' (pen.)	Report	21' Ahmed Ali; 47' Al-Shalhoub; 71' Al-Qahtani	Stadium: Prince Mohamed bin Fahd Stadium; Attendance: 21,174; Referee: Eisner Rene

10 April 2011 22	Al-Hilal	2–1	Al-Shabab	Riyadh
20:35 (UTC+03:00)	Wilhelmsson 39'; Ahmed Ali 49'	Report	54' Tavares	Stadium: King Fahd International Stadium; Attendance: 13,203; Referee: Svein Oddvar

24 April 2011 23	Al-Nassr	0–1	Al-Hilal	Riyadh
20:40 (UTC+03:00)		Report	39' Al-Dawsari	Stadium: King Fahad International Stadium; Attendance: 10,654; Referee: Gil Pawel

29 April 2011 24	Al-Hilal	2–1	Al-Raed	Riyadh
20:40 (UTC+03:00)	Radoi 36'; Al-Shalhoub 66'	Report	3' Hakami	Stadium: Prince Faisal bin Fahd Stadium; Attendance: 5,528; Referee: Abdulrahman Al-Ahmri

15 May 2011 25	Al-Qadisiyah	0–2	Al-Hilal	Khobar
20:50 (UTC+03:00)		Report	38' Al-Mehyani; 89' Al-Dawsari	Stadium: Prince Saud bin Jalawi Stadium; Attendance: 4,496; Referee: Meree Al-Awagi

20 May 2011 26	Al-Hilal	2–1	Najran	Riyadh
20:55 (UTC+03:00)	Al-Fraidi 16'; Al-Shalhoub 79'	Report	80' Linga	Stadium: Prince Faisal bin Fahd Stadium; Attendance: 8,620; Referee: Sami Al-Nemri

=== Crown Prince Cup ===
1 February 2011 Round of 16	Al-Hilal	4–0	Najran	Riyadh
20:10 (UTC+03:00)	Hawsawi 9'; Al-Qahtani 57', 78' (pen.); Al-Gizani 90'	Report		Stadium: Prince Faisal bin Fahd Stadium; Referee: Abdulrahman Al-Amri

16 February 2011 Quarter-finals	Al-Hilal	2–2 (a.e.t.) (4–3 p)	Al-Ahli	Riyadh
20:15 (UTC+03:00)	Ahmed Ali 19'; Al-Fraidi 43'	Report	50' Mouth; 53' Simões	Stadium: King Fahd International Stadium; Referee: Khalil Jalal
	Penalties
	Al-Shalhoub (penalty scored); Lee (penalty missed); Al-Gizani (penalty scored); Al-Abed (penalty missed); Hawsawi (penalty scored); Al-Qarni (penalty scored)		(penalty scored) Marcinho; (penalty scored) Petković; (penalty scored) Al-Bishi; (penalty missed) Mouath; (penalty missed) Al-Mor; (penalty missed) Victor

10 March 2011 Semi-finals	Al-Nassr	0–2	Al-Hilal	Riyadh
18:30 (UTC+03:00)		Report	19' Radoi; 54' Al-Fraidi	Stadium: King Fahd International Stadium; Referee: Jérôme Laperrière (Switzerland)

15 April 2011 Final	Al-Wehda	0–5	Al-Hilal	Makkah
20:30 (UTC+03:00)		Report	24' Ahmed Ali; 63' Al-Zori; 71' Al-Shalhoub; 74' Wilhelmsson; 82' Al-Abed	Stadium: King Abdul Aziz Stadium; Referee: Carlos Velasco (Spain)

=== King Cup of Champions ===
==== Quarter-finals ====
28 May 2011 First leg	Al-Hilal	2–1	Al-Faisaly	Riyadh
19:20 (UTC+03:00)	Radoi 51'; Al-Mehyani 70'		64' El-Thoaybi	Stadium: Prince Faisal bin Fahd Stadium

10 June 2011 Second leg	Al-Faisaly	0–3 (1–5 agg.)	Al-Hilal	Al Majma'ah
21:00 (UTC+03:00)			48' Al-Mehyani; 65' Al-Fraidi; 82' Ahmed Ali	Stadium: King Salman Sport City Stadium

==== Semi-finals ====
15 June 2011 First leg	Al-Hilal	0–3	Al-Ittihad	Riyadh
21:25 (UTC+03:00)			5' Ziaya; 83' (pen.) Noor; 84' Jorge	Stadium: Prince Faisal bin Fahd Stadium

19 June 2011 Second leg	Al-Ittihad	1–1 (4–1 agg.)	Al-Hilal	Jeddah
21:05 (UTC+03:00)	Hazazi 78'		14' Al-Mehyani	Stadium: Prince Abdullah Al Faisal Stadium

==== Third place ====
23 June 2011 Third place	Al-Hilal	6–3	Al-Wehda	Riyadh
21:05 (UTC+03:00)	Al-Shalhoub 27'; Al-Mehyani 30'; Radoi 33' (pen.), 51'; Al-Dawsari 70'; Wilhelmsson 75'		26' Al-Moasher; 58' Bukhari; 73' (pen.) Al-Sibyani	Stadium: Prince Faisal bin Fahd Stadium

=== 2010 AFC Champions League ===
==== Knockout stage ====
===== Quarter-finals =====
15 September 2010 First leg	Al-Hilal (Saudi Arabia)	3–0	(Qatar) Al-Gharafa	Riyadh, Saudi Arabia
20:35 (UTC+03:00)	Al-Shalhoub 13'; Al-Fraidi 59'; Al-Gizani 85'			Stadium: King Fahd International Stadium; Attendance: 53,241; Referee: Masaaki Toma (Japan)

22 September 2010 Second leg	Al-Gharafa (Qatar)	4–2 (a.e.t.) (4–5 agg.)	(Saudi Arabia) Al-Hilal	Doha, Qatar
18:30 (UTC+03:00)	Al Zain 2'; Mahmoud 38', 102'; El Assas 41'		117' Al-Qahtani; 119' Al-Mehyani	Stadium: Al-Gharafa Stadium; Attendance: 13,632; Referee: Abdul Malik Bashir (Singapore)

===== Semi-finals =====
6 October 2010 First leg	Zob Ahan (Iran)	1–0	(Saudi Arabia) Al-Hilal	Isfahan, Iran
17:00 (UTC+03:00)	Hadadifar 57'			Stadium: Foolad Shahr Stadium; Attendance: 9,811; Referee: Subkhiddin Mohd Salleh (Malaysia)

20 October 2010 Second leg	Al-Hilal (Saudi Arabia)	0–1 (0–2 agg.)	(Iran) Zob Ahan	Riyadh, Saudi Arabia
20:00 (UTC+03:00)			55' Igor	Stadium: King Fahd International Stadium; Attendance: 68,752; Referee: Ravshan Irmatov (Uzbekistan)

=== 2011 AFC Champions League ===
==== Group stage ====
Pos	Team	Pld	W	D	L	GF	GA	GD	Pts	Qualification	SEP	HIL	GRF	JAZ
1	(Iran) Sepahan	6	4	1	1	14	5	+9	13	knock-out stage	—	1–1	2–0	5–1
2	(Saudi Arabia) Al-Hilal	6	4	1	1	11	6	+5	13	knock-out stage	1–2	—	2–0	3–1
3	(Qatar) Al-Gharafa	6	2	1	3	6	7	−1	7		1–0	0–1	—	5–2
4	(United Arab Emirates) Al-Jazira	6	0	1	5	7	20	−13	1		1–4	2–3	0–0	—

Source: Soccerway
Rules for classification: Group stage tiebreakers

1 March 2011 1	Al-Hilal (Saudi Arabia)	1–2	(Iran) Sepahan	Riyadh, Saudi Arabia
20:30 (UTC+03:00)	Wilhelmsson 90+3'		51' Touré; 60' Januário	Stadium: King Fahd International Stadium; Attendance: 15,000; Referee: Ravshan Irmatov (Uzbekistan)

15 March 2011 2	Al-Gharafa (Qatar)	0–1	(Saudi Arabia) Al-Hilal	Doha, Qatar
18:30 (UTC+03:00)			9' Wilhelmsson	Stadium: Al-Gharafa Stadium; Attendance: 8,310; Referee: Kim Dong-Jin (Korea Republic)

5 April 2011 3	Al-Hilal (Saudi Arabia)	3–1	(United Arab Emirates) Al-Jazira	Riyadh, Saudi Arabia
20:45 (UTC+03:00)	Ahmed Ali 4'; Al-Qahtani 14'; Al-Shalhoub 90+4'		19' Jumaa	Stadium: King Fahd International Stadium; Attendance: 13,421; Referee: Ben Williams (Australia)

20 April 2011 4	Al-Jazira (United Arab Emirates)	2–3	(Saudi Arabia) Al-Hilal	Abu Dhabi, UAE
18:50 (UTC+03:00)	Mabkhout 44'; Qasim 45'		56', 65' Al-Qahtani; 77' (pen.) Radoi	Stadium: Mohamed Bin Zayid Stadium; Attendance: 6,154; Referee: Masaaki Toma (Japan)

4 May 2011 5	Sepahan (Iran)	1–1	(Saudi Arabia) Al-Hilal	Isfahan, Iran
18:30 (UTC+03:00)	Navidkia 55'		46' Al-Zori	Stadium: Foolad Shahr Stadium; Attendance: 8,833; Referee: Tan Hai (China PR)

11 May 2011 6	Al-Hilal (Saudi Arabia)	2–0	(Qatar) Al-Gharafa	Riyadh, Saudi Arabia
21:05 (UTC+03:00)	Al-Qahtani 47'; Al-Fraidi 82'			Stadium: King Fahd International Stadium; Attendance: 19,123; Referee: Minoru Tōjō (Japan)

==== Knockout stage ====
===== Round of 16 =====
24 May 2011 Round of 16	Al-Ittihad (Saudi Arabia)	3–1	(Saudi Arabia) Al-Hilal	Jeddah, Saudi Arabia
21:05 (UTC+03:00)	Nuno Assis 15', 59'; Ziaya 17'		82' Al-Dawsari	Stadium: Prince Abdullah Al Faisal Stadium; Attendance: 17,150; Referee: Kim Dong-Jin (South Korea)

== Statistics ==
=== Goalscorers ===
Rank	No.	Pos	Nat	Name	Pro League	King Cup	Crown Prince Cup	2010 ACL	2011 ACL	Total
1	20	FW	(Saudi Arabia)	Yasser Al-Qahtani	11	0	2	1	4	18
2	8	MF	(Romania)	Mirel Rădoi	6	3	1	0	1	11
3	9	MF	(Sweden)	Christian Wilhelmsson	6	1	1	0	2	10
3	16	FW	(Saudi Arabia)	Essa Al-Mehyani	5	4	0	1	0	10
4	10	MF	(Saudi Arabia)	Mohammad Al-Shalhoub	5	1	1	1	1	9
5	15	MF	(Saudi Arabia)	Ahmed Al-Fraidi	2	1	2	1	1	7
6	7	MF	(Brazil)	Thiago Neves	6	0	0	0	0	6
6	18	FW	(Egypt)	Ahmed Ali	2	1	2	0	1	6
7	11	MF	(Saudi Arabia)	Abdullaziz Al-Dawsari	3	1	0	0	1	4
8	24	MF	(Saudi Arabia)	Nawaf Al-Abed	2	0	1	0	0	3
9	4	DF	(Saudi Arabia)	Abdullah Al-Zori	0	0	1	0	1	2
9	3	DF	(Saudi Arabia)	Osama Hawsawi	1	1	0	0	0	2
9	14	FW	(Saudi Arabia)	Waleed Al-Gizani	0	0	1	1	0	2
10	5	MF	(Saudi Arabia)	Abdulatif Al-Ghanam	1	0	0	0	0	1
10	25	DF	(Saudi Arabia)	Majed Al Marshadi	1	0	0	0	0	1
Total					51	13	12	5	12	93

=== Assists ===
Rank	No.	Pos	Nat	Name	League	King Cup	Crown Prince Cup	2010 CL	2011 CL	Total
1	9	MF	(Sweden)	Christian Wilhelmsson	9	2	4	0	1	16
2	15	MF	(Saudi Arabia)	Ahmed Al-Fraidi	5	2	0	0	2	9
3	10	MF	(Saudi Arabia)	Mohammad Al-Shalhoub	5	0	0	1	0	6
3	16	FW	(Saudi Arabia)	Essa Al-Mehyani	2	2	0	0	2	6
4	24	MF	(Saudi Arabia)	Nawaf Al-Abed	3	0	2	0	0	5
5	18	DF	(Egypt)	Ahmed Ali	2	0	2	0	0	4
6	8	MF	(Romania)	Mirel Rădoi	2	0	1	0	0	3
6	11	MF	(Saudi Arabia)	Abdullaziz Al-Dawsari	0	1	1	0	1	3
7	7	MF	(Brazil)	Thiago Neves	2	0	0	0	0	2
7	12	DF	(South Korea)	Lee Young-pyo	2	0	0	0	0	2
7	13	FW	(Saudi Arabia)	Salman Al-Faraj	2	0	0	0	0	2
7	20	FW	(Saudi Arabia)	Yasser Al-Qahtani	1	0	0	0	1	2
7	25	DF	(Saudi Arabia)	Majed Al Marshadi	0	1	0	0	1	2
8	4	DF	(Saudi Arabia)	Abdullah Al-Zori	1	0	0	0	0	1
8	14	FW	(Saudi Arabia)	Waleed Al-Gizani	1	0	0	0	0	1
Total					37	8	10	1	8	64

== See also ==
- List of unbeaten football club seasons
