= 2011–12 Al-Hilal FC season =

Al-Hilal
2011–12 season
- President: (Saudi Arabia) Abdulrahman bin Musa'ad
- Manager: (Germany) Thomas Doll (until 22 January 2012) (Czech Republic) Ivan Hašek (From 23 January 2012)
- Stadium: King Fahd Stadium; Prince Faisal bin Fahd Stadium
- SPL: 3rd
- Crown Prince Cup: Winners
- King Cup of Champions: Semi-finals
- AFC Champions League: 2012: Quarter-finals^{1}
- Top goalscorer: League: Youssef El-Arabi (12); All: Youssef El-Arabi (16)
- Highest home attendance: 22,996 vs Al-Ahli (29 September 2011, Pro League)
- Lowest home attendance: 352 vs Al-Ettifaq (14 April 2012, Pro League)
- Average home league attendance: 7,470
Home colours	Away colours	Third colours

The 2011–12 Al-Hilal FC season was Al-Hilal Saudi Football Club's 55th in existence and 36th consecutive season in the top flight of Saudi Arabian football. Along with Pro League, the club participated in the AFC Champions League, Crown Prince Cup, and the King Cup.

== Players ==
=== Squad information ===
Players and squad numbers.
Note: Flags indicate national team as has been defined under FIFA eligibility rules. Players may hold more than one non-FIFA nationality.

No.	Nat.	Position	Name	Date of birth (age)
Goalkeepers
28	(Saudi Arabia)	GK	Abdullah Al-Sudairy	2 February 1992 (aged 20)
1	(Saudi Arabia)	GK	Khalid Sharhili	3 February 1987 (aged 25)
30	(Saudi Arabia)	GK	Hassan Al-Otaibi	16 October 1977 (aged 34)
Defenders
2	(Saudi Arabia)	RB	Sultan Al-Bishi	28 January 1990 (aged 22)
17	(Saudi Arabia)	CB	Abdullah Al-Dawsari	24 June 1990 (aged 22)
4	(Saudi Arabia)	LB / CB	Abdullah Al-Zori	13 August 1987 (aged 24)
12	(Saudi Arabia)	LB / RB	Shafi Al-Dossari	1 February 1990 (aged 22)
25	(Saudi Arabia)	CB	Majed Al Marshadi	1 November 1984 (aged 27)
3	(Saudi Arabia)	CB	Osama Hawsawi (C)	31 March 1984 (aged 28)
19	(Saudi Arabia)	CB	Mohammad Nami	7 January 1982 (aged 30)
23	(Saudi Arabia)	CB	Hassan Khairat	8 March 1986 (aged 26)
Midfielders
6	(Saudi Arabia)	DM / CM	Mohammed Al-Qarni	24 November 1989 (aged 22)
5	(Saudi Arabia)	CM / AM	Abdulatif Al-Ghanam	16 July 1985 (aged 26)
15	(Saudi Arabia)	RM	Ahmed Al-Fraidi	29 January 1988 (aged 24)
10	(Saudi Arabia)	AM / LW	Mohammad Al-Shalhoub	8 December 1980 (aged 31)
11	(Saudi Arabia)	AM / LM	Abdullaziz Al-Dawsari	11 October 1988 (aged 23)
13	(Saudi Arabia)	AM / LM / LW	Salman Al-Faraj (C)	8 January 1989 (aged 23)
21	(Morocco)	CM	Adil Hermach	27 June 1986 (aged 26)
24	(Saudi Arabia)	LM / RM	Nawaf Al-Abed	26 January 1990 (aged 22)
29	(Saudi Arabia)	RM	Salem Al-Dawsari	19 August 1991 (aged 20)
8	(Sweden)	RM	Christian Wilhelmsson	8 December 1979 (aged 32)
Forwards
7	(South Korea)	ST / CF	Yoo Byung-soo	26 March 1988 (aged 24)
9	(Morocco)	ST / CF	Youssef El-Arabi	3 February 1987 (aged 25)
14	(Saudi Arabia)	RW	Saad Al-Harthi	3 February 1984 (aged 28)
16	(Saudi Arabia)	ST / CF	Essa Al-Mehyani	22 June 1983 (aged 29)

== Competitions ==
=== Overall ===
Competition	Started round	Final position / round	First match	Last match
Pro League	—	3rd	10 September 2011	14 April 2012
Crown Prince Cup	Round of 16	Winners	21 December 2011	10 February 2012
2012 ACL	Group stage	Round of 16^{1}	7 March 2012	23 May 2012
King Cup of Champions	Quarter-finals	Semi-finals	22 April 2012	17 May 2012

Notes

- Note 1: Al-Hilal qualified to the quarter-finals.

=== Overview ===
Competition	Record							
Competition	Pld	W	D	L	GF	GA	GD	Win %
Pro League	26	18	6	2	58	22	+36	69.23
King Cup of Champions	5	0	3	2	5	9	−4	0.00
Crown Prince Cup	4	4	0	0	14	3	+11	100.00
2012 ACL	7	4	3	0	17	8	+9	57.14
Total	42	26	12	4	94	42	+52	61.90

Source: Competitions

=== Pro League ===
==== League table ====
Pos	Team	Pld	W	D	L	GF	GA	GD	Pts	Qualification or relegation
1	Al-Shabab (C)	26	19	7	0	50	16	+34	64	Qualification to AFC Champions League (Note: Al-Ettifaq secured qualification for the 2013 AFC Champions League due to Al-Ahli winning the 2012 King Cup of Champions)
2	Al-Ahli	26	19	5	2	60	22	+38	62	Qualification to AFC Champions League
3	Al-Hilal	26	18	6	2	58	22	+36	60	Qualification to AFC Champions League
4	Al-Ettifaq	26	13	8	5	41	26	+15	47	Qualification to AFC Champions League
5	Al-Ittihad	26	10	7	9	49	35	+14	37	

Source: slstat.com
Rules for classification: 1) Points; 2) Head-to-head points; 3) Head-to-head goal difference; 4) Total goal difference; 5) Total goals scored; 6) Play-off (only for deciding champion, relegation and AFC competitions participation).
(C) Champions

==== Results summary ====
Overall								Home						Away					
Pld	W	D	L	GF	GA	GD	Pts	W	D	L	GF	GA	GD	W	D	L	GF	GA	GD
26	18	6	2	58	22	+36	60	9	3	1	31	13	+18	9	3	1	27	9	+18

Source: Competitive matches

==== Results by round ====
Round	1	2	3	4	5	6	7	8	9	10	11	12	13	14	15	16	17	18	19	20	21	22	23	24	25	26
Ground	A	H	A	H	A	A	H	A	A	H	H	A	H	H	A	H	A	H	H	A	A	H	H	A	A	H
Result	W	L	W	W	W	W	W	W	W	W	W	D	D	W	D	D	L	W	W	W	D	W	W	W	W	D
Position	3	9	4	3	3	3	3	3	3	2	2	2	2	1	1	3	4	3	3	3	3	3	3	3	3	3

Source: Competitive matches
A = Away; H = Home; W = Win; D = Draw; L = Loss

==== Matches ====
10 September 2011 1	Hajer	1–2	Al-Hilal	Al-Hasa
20:30 (UTC+03:00)	Rejaib 43'	Report	48', 66' El-Arabi	Stadium: Prince Abdullah bin Jalawi Stadium; Attendance: 4,225; Referee: Abdulrahman Al-Ahmri

15 September 2011 2	Al-Hilal	0–2	Al-Shabab	Riyadh
20:25 (UTC+03:00)		Report	22', 75' Al-Shamrani	Stadium: King Fahad International Stadium; Attendance: 12,276; Referee: Khalil Jalal

23 September 2011 3	Al-Taawoun	0–1	Al-Hilal	Buraidah
20:20 (UTC+03:00)		Report	54' Nami	Stadium: King Abdullah Sport City Stadium; Attendance: 19,658; Referee: Abdulaziz Al-Funaitel

29 September 2011 4	Al-Hilal	4–0	Al-Ahli	Riyadh
20:10 (UTC+03:00)	Yoo Byung-Soo 22'; Al-Fraidi 25'; Al-Shalhoub 47' (pen.); Hawsawi 69'	Report		Stadium: King Fahd International Stadium; Attendance: 22,996; Referee: Kever Saschai

15 October 2011 5	Al-Faisaly	0–2	Al-Hilal	Al Majma'ah
19:55 (UTC+03:00)		Report	37' Emaná; 92' Al-Shalhoub	Stadium: King Salman Sport City Stadium; Attendance: 3,223; Referee: Metref Al-Qahtani

20 October 2011 6	Al-Qadisiyah	4–5	Al-Hilal	Khobar
19:50 (UTC+03:00)	Al-Shamali 43'; Al-Quainem 58'; Bouguèche 79', 87'	Report	5', 6', 22' El-Arabi; 32' Al-Dawsari; 46' Emaná	Stadium: Prince Saud bin Jalawi Stadium; Attendance: 6,711; Referee: Abdulrahman Al-Amri

1 November 2011 7	Al-Hilal	2–0	Al-Raed	Riyadh
19:45 (UTC+03:00)	Emaná 79' (pen.); Al-Fraidi 83'	Report		Stadium: Prince Faisal bin Fahd Stadium; Attendance: 7,708; Referee: Saad Al-Kathiri

19 November 2011 8	Al-Ansar	0–2	Al-Hilal	Medina
19:35 (UTC+03:00)		Report	33' (pen.) Al-Shalhoub; 48' El-Arabi	Stadium: Prince Mohammed bin Abdul Aziz Stadium; Attendance: 18,400; Referee: Fahad Al-Mirdasi

24 November 2011 9	Al-Nassr	0–3	Al-Hilal	Riyadh
19:35 (UTC+03:00)		Report	10', 29' (pen.) Al-Shalhoub; 84' Al-Dawsari	Stadium: Prince Faisal bin Fahd Stadium; Attendance: 17,945; Referee: Khalil Jalal

2 December 2011 10	Al-Hilal	3–2	Al-Fateh	Riyadh
15:05 (UTC+03:00)	El-Arabi 2'; Al-Zori 12'; Emaná 60'	Report	4' Boabeed; 68' Al-Hamdan	Stadium: Prince Faisal bin Fahd Stadium; Attendance: 5,680; Referee: Meree Al-Awagi

9 December 2011 11	Al-Hilal	2–1	Najran	Riyadh
15:05 (UTC+03:00)	El-Arabi 68'; Al-Mehyani 96'	Report	16' Al-Robeai	Stadium: Prince Faisal bin Fahd Stadium; Attendance: 5,247; Referee: Mohammed Al-Hoaish

15 December 2011 12	Al-Ettifaq	2–2	Al-Hilal	Dammam
19:35 (UTC+03:00)	Otain 13'; Al-Hamed 51'	Report	46', 52' Al-Mehyani	Stadium: Prince Mohamed bin Fahd Stadium; Attendance: 18,016; Referee: Jerome Laperriere

26 December 2011 13	Al-Hilal	1–1	Al-Ittihad	Riyadh
19:45 (UTC+03:00)	Hermach 68'	Report	83' Hazazi	Stadium: Prince Faisal bin Fahd Stadium; Attendance: 14,827; Referee: Victor Kassai

31 December 2011 14	Al-Hilal	3–1	Hajer	Riyadh
19:45 (UTC+03:00)	Al-Dawsari 35'; El-Arabi 69', 78'	Report	7' Al-Khamis	Stadium: Prince Faisal bin Fahd Stadium; Attendance: 2,649; Referee: Shukri Al-Hanfosh

4 January 2012 15	Al-Shabab	0–0	Al-Hilal	Riyadh
19:50 (UTC+03:00)		Report		Stadium: Prince Faisal bin Fahd Stadium; Attendance: 8,123; Referee: Gomes Duarte

11 January 2012 16	Al-Hilal	1–1	Al-Taawoun	Riyadh
19:55 (UTC+03:00)	Al-Mehyani 54'	Report	14' Al-Harbi	Stadium: Prince Faisal bin Fahd Stadium; Attendance: 4,732; Referee: Metref Al-Qahtani

19 January 2012 17	Al-Ahli	1–0	Al-Hilal	Jeddah
20:00 (UTC+03:00)	Al-Hosani 57'	Report		Stadium: Prince Abdullah Al Faisal Stadium; Attendance: 17,150; Referee: Carlos Xistra

2 February 2012 18	Al-Hilal	2–1	Al-Faisaly	Riyadh
15:40 (UTC+03:00)	Al-Abed 16'; Hawsawi 75'	Report	53' Al-Kharashi	Stadium: Prince Faisal bin Fahd Stadium; Attendance: 4,243; Referee: Meree Al-Awagi

6 February 2012 19	Al-Hilal	3–0	Al-Qadisiyah	Riyadh
20:15 (UTC+03:00)	Yoo Byung-Soo 7', 36'; Wilhelmsson 94' (pen.)	Report		Stadium: Prince Faisal bin Fahd Stadium; Attendance: 2,534; Referee: Mohammed Al-Hoaish

14 February 2012 20	Al-Ittihad	0–2	Al-Hilal	Jeddah
20:20 (UTC+03:00)		Report	41' Al-Abed; 92' Al-Shalhoub	Stadium: Prince Abdullah Al-Faisal Stadium; Attendance: 15,200; Referee: Meree Al-Awagi

12 March 2012 21	Al-Raed	1–1	Al-Hilal	Buraidah
20:25 (UTC+03:00)	Al-Musalem 80'	Report	36' Al-Harthi	Stadium: King Abdullah Sport City Stadium; Attendance: 22,523; Referee: Abdulrahman Al-Ahmri

16 March 2012 22	Al-Hilal	6–1	Al-Ansar	Riyadh
20:25 (UTC+03:00)	Yoo Byung-Soo 37', 66'; Al-Harthi 59'; Wilhelmsson 60', 79'; Al-Faraj 68'	Report	47' Al-Shenqiti	Stadium: Prince Faisal bin Fahd Stadium; Attendance: 1,751; Referee: Sami Al-Nemri

25 March 2012 23	Al-Hilal	1–0	Al-Nassr	Riyadh
20:30 (UTC+03:00)	Al-Abed 87'	Report		Stadium: King Fahad International Stadium; Attendance: 12,117; Referee: Fritz Marco

29 March 2012 24	Al-Fateh	0–5	Al-Hilal	Al-Hasa
20:30 (UTC+03:00)		Report	15', 69' El-Arabi; 57' Wilhelmsson; 75' Al-Dawsari; 92' Al-Mehyani	Stadium: Prince Abdullah bin Jalawi Stadium; Attendance: 4,672; Referee: Abdulaziz Al-Funaitel

8 April 2012 25	Najran	0–2	Al-Hilal	Najran
20:40 (UTC+03:00)		Report	41' Al-Shalhoub; 55' Hermach	Stadium: Al Akhdoud Club Stadium; Attendance: 1,820; Referee: Khalil Jalal

14 April 2012 26	Al-Hilal	3–3	Al-Ettifaq	Riyadh
20:40 (UTC+03:00)	Al-Zori 25'; Yoo Byung-Soo 26'; Wilhelmsson 76' (pen.)	Report	20', 43' Al-Salem; 94' Al-Jamaan	Stadium: King Fahd International Stadium; Attendance: 352; Referee: Sami Al-Nemri

=== Crown Prince Cup ===
21 December 2011 Round of 16	Al-Shoulla	1–6	Al-Hilal	Al-Kharj
19:40 (UTC+03:00)	Al-Bishi 90+1'	Report	8', 41' Byung-Soo; 26' Al-Shalhoub; 32' Al-Mehyani; 45', 72' Al-Abed	Stadium: Al-Shoalah Club Stadium; Referee: Mashari Al-Mashari

23 January 2012 Quarter-finals	Al-Hilal	4–1	Al-Nassr	Riyadh
20:00 (UTC+03:00)	Hawsawi 4' (o.g.); Al-Shalhoub 22' (pen.); Al-Dosari 24'; Byung-Soo 50'	Report	60' Al-Sahlawi	Stadium: Prince Faisal bin Fahd Stadium; Referee: Anastasios Sidiropoulos (Greece)

27 January 2012 Semi-finals	Al-Hilal	2–0	Al-Ittihad	Riyadh
20:00 (UTC+03:00)	Byung-Soo 14'; Al-Abed 72'	Report		Stadium: King Fahd International Stadium; Referee: Alexandru Tudor (Romania)

10 February 2012 Final	Al-Hilal	2–1	Al-Ettifaq	Riyadh
20:00 (UTC+03:00)	Wilhelmsson 9'; Al-Abed 21'	Report	35' Al-Shehri	Stadium: King Fahd International Stadium; Attendance: 50,122; Referee: Nicola Rizzoli (Italy)

=== King Cup of Champions ===
==== Quarter-finals ====
22 April 2012 First leg	Al-Ittihad	2–2	Al-Hilal	Jeddah
20:50 (UTC+03:00)	Abd Rabo 25', 56'		7' Al-Fraidi; 83' Al-Dawsari	Stadium: Prince Abdullah Al-Faisal Stadium

26 April 2012 Second leg	Al-Hilal	1–1 (3–3 agg.)	Al-Ittihad	Riyadh
20:50 (UTC+03:00)	Hermach 83'		47' (pen.) Hazazi	Stadium: King Fahd International Stadium

==== Semi-finals ====
7 May 2012 First leg	Al-Hilal	0–1	Al-Ahli	Riyadh
20:50 (UTC+03:00)			60' Al Hosni	Stadium: King Fahd International Stadium

11 May 2012 Second leg	Al-Ahli	2–2 (3–2 agg.)	Al-Hilal	Jeddah
20:50 (UTC+03:00)	Al-Harbi 21'; Palomino 79'		23', 90+3' (pen.) Wilhelmsson	Stadium: Prince Abdullah Al-Faisal Stadium

==== Third place ====
17 May 2012	Al-Hilal	0–3	Al-Fateh	Riyadh
20:50 (UTC+03:00)			44', 71' (pen.) Élton; 76' Al-Mogahwi	Stadium: Prince Faisal bin Fahd Stadium

=== 2012 AFC Champions League ===
==== Group stage ====
Pos	Team	Pld	W	D	L	GF	GA	GD	Pts	Qualification	HIL	PER	GRF	SHA
1	(Saudi Arabia) Al-Hilal	6	3	3	0	10	7	+3	12	knock-out stage	—	1–1	2–1	2–1
2	(Iran) Persepolis	6	3	2	1	14	5	+9	11	knock-out stage	0–1	—	1–1	6–1
3	(Qatar) Al-Gharafa	6	1	3	2	7	10	−3	6		3–3	0–3	—	2–1
4	(United Arab Emirates) Al-Shabab	6	0	2	4	5	14	−9	2		1–1	1–3	0–0	—

Source: AFC
Rules for classification: Group stage tiebreakers

7 March 2012 1	Al-Hilal (Saudi Arabia)	1–1	(Iran) Persepolis	Riyadh, Saudi Arabia
20:30 (UTC+03:00)	Al-Shalhoub 53'	Report	42' (pen.) Karimi	Stadium: Prince Faisal bin Fahd Stadium; Attendance: 9,574; Referee: Lee Min-Hu (Korea Republic)

21 March 2012 2	Al-Gharafa (Qatar)	3–3	(Saudi Arabia) Al-Hilal	Doha, Qatar
18:30 (UTC+03:00)	Tardelli 44', 78'; El Assas 90+3' (pen.)	Report	16' Hermach; 64' El-Arabi; 75' Al-Zori	Stadium: Al-Gharafa Stadium; Attendance: 6,092; Referee: Nawaf Shukralla (Bahrain)

4 April 2012 3	Al-Shabab (United Arab Emirates)	1–1	(Saudi Arabia) Al-Hilal	Dubai, UAE
19:30 (UTC+03:00)	Ciel 37'	Report	70' Yoo Byung-Soo	Stadium: Maktoum Bin Rashid Al Maktoum Stadium; Attendance: 4,522; Referee: Ben Williams (Australia)

17 April 2012 4	Al-Hilal (Saudi Arabia)	2–1	(United Arab Emirates) Al-Shabab	Riyadh, Saudi Arabia
20:50 (UTC+03:00)	El-Arabi 45', 68'	Report	28' Kieza	Stadium: Prince Faisal bin Fahd Stadium; Attendance: 2,118; Referee: Andre El Haddad (Lebanon)

1 May 2012 5	Persepolis (Iran)	0–1	(Saudi Arabia) Al-Hilal	Tehran, Iran
17:00 (UTC+03:00)		Report	59' El-Arabi	Stadium: Azadi Stadium; Attendance: 73,154; Referee: Kim Dong-Jin (Korea Republic)

15 May 2012 6	Al-Hilal (Saudi Arabia)	2–1	(Qatar) Al-Gharafa	Riyadh, Saudi Arabia
21:00 (UTC+03:00)	Al-Fraidi 48'; Al-Abed 65'	Report	82' (o.g.) Hawsawi	Stadium: Prince Faisal bin Fahd Stadium; Attendance: 10,275; Referee: Yuichi Nishimura (Japan)

==== Knockout stage ====
===== Round of 16 =====
23 May 2012 Round of 16	Al-Hilal (Saudi Arabia)	7–1	(United Arab Emirates) Baniyas	Riyadh, Saudi Arabia
21:10 (UTC+03:00)	Yoo Byung-Soo 23', 38', 53', 61'; Wilhelmsson 26', 59'; Al-Dawsari 86'	Report	57' (pen.) Yeste	Stadium: Prince Faisal bin Fahd Stadium; Attendance: 22,518; Referee: Nawaf Shukralla (Bahrain)

== Statistics ==
=== Goalscorers ===
Rank	No.	Pos	Nat	Name	Pro League	King Cup	Crown Prince Cup	2012 ACL	Total
1	9	FW	(Morocco)	Youssef El-Arabi	12	0	0	4	16
2	7	FW	(South Korea)	Yoo Byung-Soo	6	0	4	5	15
3	10	MF	(Saudi Arabia)	Mohammad Al-Shalhoub	7	0	2	1	10
3	8	MF	(Sweden)	Christian Wilhelmsson	5	2	1	2	10
4	24	MF	(Saudi Arabia)	Nawaf Al-Abed	3	0	4	1	8
5	16	FW	(Saudi Arabia)	Essa Al-Mehyani	5	0	1	0	6
6	15	MF	(Saudi Arabia)	Ahmed Al-Fraidi	2	1	0	1	4
6	21	MF	(Morocco)	Adil Hermach	2	1	0	1	4
6	29	MF	(Saudi Arabia)	Salem Al-Dawsari	2	1	0	1	4
6	8	MF	(Cameroon)	Achille Emaná	4	0	0	0	4
7	4	DF	(Saudi Arabia)	Abdullah Al-Zori	2	0	0	1	3
7	11	MF	(Saudi Arabia)	Abdullaziz Al-Dawsari	2	0	1	0	3
8	3	DF	(Saudi Arabia)	Osama Hawsawi	2	0	0	0	2
8	14	FW	(Saudi Arabia)	Saad Al-Harthi	2	0	0	0	2
9	19	DF	(Saudi Arabia)	Mohammad Nami	1	0	0	0	1
9	13	MF	(Saudi Arabia)	Salman Al-Faraj	1	0	0	0	1
Total					58	5	13	17	93

=== Assists ===
Rank	No.	Pos	Nat	Name	League	King Cup	Crown Prince Cup	2012 CL	Total
1	10	MF	(Saudi Arabia)	Mohammad Al-Shalhoub	6	0	2	1	9
1	15	MF	(Saudi Arabia)	Ahmed Al-Fraidi	5	0	0	4	9
2	7	FW	(South Korea)	Yoo Byung-Soo	4	0	1	2	7
3	9	FW	(Morocco)	Youssef El-Arabi	4	0	0	1	5
3	21	MF	(Morocco)	Adil Hermach	4	1	0	0	5
3	8	FW	(Sweden)	Christian Wilhelmsson	2	0	0	3	5
4	24	MF	(Saudi Arabia)	Nawaf Al-Abed	1	0	1	2	4
4	29	MF	(Saudi Arabia)	Salem Al-Dawsari	3	0	1	0	4
5	2	DF	(Saudi Arabia)	Sultan Al-Bishi	1	0	2	0	3
5	13	MF	(Saudi Arabia)	Salman Al-Faraj	2	0	0	1	3
6	4	DF	(Saudi Arabia)	Abdullah Al-Zori	2	0	0	0	2
7	19	DF	(Saudi Arabia)	Mohammad Nami	1	0	0	0	1
7	11	MF	(Saudi Arabia)	Abdullaziz Al-Dawsari	1	0	0	0	1
7	8	MF	(Cameroon)	Achille Emaná	1	0	0	0	1
7	16	FW	(Saudi Arabia)	Essa Al-Mehyani	1	0	0	0	1
7	3	DF	(Saudi Arabia)	Osama Hawsawi	1	0	0	0	1
Total					39	1	7	14	61
