= 2011 King Cup of Champions =

Tournament details
- Country: Saudi Arabia
- Dates: 28 May - 24 June 2011
- Teams: 8

Final positions
- Champions: Al-Ahli
- Runners-up: Al-Ittihad

Tournament statistics
- Matches played: 14
- Goals scored: 51 (3.64 per match)
- Top goal scorer: Mukhtar Fallatah (6 goals)

The 2011 King Cup of Champions, or The Custodian of the Two Holy Mosques Cup, was the 36th season of King Cup of Champions since its establishment in 1957, and the 4th under the current edition.

The tournament was won by Al-Ahli, who beat defending champions Al-Ittihad 4–2 on penalties in the final. It was their first title in current edition and eleventh title overall, they also qualified for 2012 AFC Champions League.

== Participating teams ==
Team	Qualifying method	App*	Last App
Al-Hilal	2010–11 Professional League champions	4th	2010
Al-Ittihad	2010–11 Professional League runners-up	4th	2010
Al-Ettifaq	2010–11 Professional League 3rd place	3rd	2009
Al-Shabab	2010–11 Professional League 4th place	4th	2010
Al-Nassr	2010–11 Professional League 5th place	4th	2010
Al-Ahli	2010–11 Professional League 6th place	4th	2010
Al-Faisaly	2010–11 Professional League 7th place	1st	none
Al-Wehda	2010–11 Crown Prince Cup runners-up 2010–11 Professional League 13th place	4th	2010

* Number of appearance in King Cup of Champions since the 2008 season .

== Fixtures and results ==
=== Bracket ===
Quarter-finals
1	Al-Hilal	2	3	5
7	Al-Faisaly	1	0	1
5	Al-Nassr	3	1	4
2	Al-Ittihad (a)	3	1	4
13	Al-Wehda (a)	2	3	5
3	Al-Ettifaq	1	4	5
4	Al-Shabab	0	1	1
6	Al-Ahli	3	0	3

Semi-finals
1	Al-Hilal	0	1	1
2	Al-Ittihad	3	1	4
13	Al-Wehda	2	1	3
6	Al-Ahli	2	4	6

Final
2	Al-Ittihad	0 (2)
6	Al-Ahli (p)	0 (4)
Third place
1	Al-Hilal	6
13	Al-Wehda	3

=== Quarter-finals ===
Quarter-finals were played on 28, 29 May and 10, 11 June 2011.

Team 1	Agg.	Team 2	1st leg	2nd leg
Al-Hilal	5–1	Al-Faisaly	2–1	3–0
Al-Nassr	4–4 (a)	Al-Ittihad	3–3	1–1
Al-Wehda	5–5 (a)	Al-Ettifaq	2–1	3–4
Al-Shabab	1–3	Al-Ahli	0–3	1–0

==== First leg ====
28 May 2011 1	Al-Hilal	2–1	Al-Faisaly	Riyadh
19:20 (UTC+3)	Rădoi 51'; Al-Mehyani 70'		64' El-Thoaybi	Stadium: Prince Faisal bin Fahd Stadium

28 May 2011 2	Al-Wehda	2–1	Al-Ettifaq	Makkah
19:40 (UTC+3)	Fallatah 21'; Al-Sibyani 90+2'		88' Al-Salem	Stadium: King Abdul Aziz Stadium

29 May 2011 3	Al-Nassr	3–3	Al-Ittihad	Riyadh
21:00 (UTC+3)	Al-Mutawa 16'; Salem 42' (o.g.); Belal 65'		44' (pen.) Ziaya; 58', 90+3' Al-Rashid	Stadium: King Fahd International Stadium

29 May 2011 4	Al-Shabab	0–3 (awarded)	Al-Ahli	Riyadh
21:00 (UTC+3)				Stadium: Prince Faisal bin Fahd Stadium

Notes

1. The SAFF Disciplinary Committee decided to award the quarter-final first leg to Al-Ahli against Al-Shabab as a 3–0 forfeit win after Al-Shabab were found guilty of fielding an ineligible player. The game originally ended 2–1 to Al-Shabab.

==== Second leg ====
10 June 2011 5	Al-Ittihad	1–1	Al-Nassr	Jeddah
21:00 (UTC+3)	Hazazi 65'		52' McKain	Stadium: Prince Abdullah Al Faisal Stadium

10 June 2011 6	Al-Faisaly	0–3	Al-Hilal	Al-Majma'ah
21:00 (UTC+3)			48' Al-Mehyani; 65' Al-Fraidi; 82' Ahmed Ali	Stadium: King Salman Sport City Stadium

11 June 2011 7	Al-Ahli	0–1	Al-Shabab	Jeddah
21:05 (UTC+3)			33' Al-Marhoum	Stadium: Prince Abdullah Al Faisal Stadium

11 June 2011 8	Al-Ettifaq	4–3	Al-Wehda	Dammam
21:05 (UTC+3)	Al-Salem 4', 45+1'; Rishani 12'; Tagliabué 63'		25', 69' (pen.), 77' Fallatah	Stadium: Prince Mohamed bin Fahd Stadium

=== Semi-finals ===
Semi-finals were played on 15, 16, 19 & 20 June 2011.

Team 1	Agg.	Team 2	1st leg	2nd leg
Al-Hilal	1–4	Al-Ittihad	0–3	2–2
Al-Wehda	3–6	Al-Ahli	2–2	1–4

==== First leg ====
15 June 2011 9	Al-Hilal	0–3	Al-Ittihad	Riyadh
21:25 (UTC+3)			5' Ziaya; 83' (pen.) Noor; 84' Jorge	Stadium: Prince Faisal bin Fahd Stadium

16 June 2011 10	Al-Wehda	2–2	Al-Ahli	Makkah
21:05 (UTC+3)	Fallatah 8', 81'		90', 90+2' Al-Hosni	Stadium: King Abdul Aziz Stadium

==== Second leg ====
19 June 2011 11	Al-Ittihad	1–1	Al-Hilal	Jeddah
21:05 (UTC+3)	Hazazi 78'		14' Al-Mehyani	Stadium: Prince Abdullah Al Faisal Stadium

20 June 2011 12	Al-Ahli	4–1	Al-Wehda	Jeddah
21:05 (UTC+3)	Simões 31', 75'; Al-Mor 55'; Al-Hosni 67'		78' Al-Sibyani	Stadium: Prince Abdullah Al Faisal Stadium

=== Third place ===
Third place game was played on 23 June 2011.

23 June 2011 13	Al-Hilal	6–3	Al-Wehda	Riyadh
21:05 (UTC+3)	Al-Shalhoub 27'; Al-Mehyani 30'; Rădoi 33' (pen.), 51'; Al-Dawsari 70'; Wilhelmsson 75'		26' Al-Moasher; 58' Bukhari; 73' (pen.) Al-Sibyani	Stadium: Prince Faisal bin Fahd Stadium

=== Final ===
24 June 2011
21:05 UTC+3

Al-Ittihad	0–0 (a.e.t.)	Al-Ahli
Penalties
Kariri (penalty missed); Al-Raheeb (penalty scored); Osama (penalty missed); Noor (penalty scored)	2–4	(penalty scored) Marcinho; (penalty missed) Al-Harbi; (penalty scored) Al-Bishi; (penalty scored) Petković; (penalty scored) Simões

Prince Abdullah Al Faisal Stadium, Jeddah
Referee: Frank De Bleeckere (Belgium)

==== Winner ====
King Cup of Champions
2011 Winners
Al-Ahli
11th Title
