= 2012–13 Al-Hilal FC season =

Al Hilal
2012–13 season
- President: (Saudi Arabia) Abdulrahman bin Musa'ad
- Manager: (France) Antoine Kombouaré (until 31 January 2013) (Croatia) Zlatko Dalić (From 1 February 2013)
- Stadium: King Fahd Stadium; Prince Faisal bin Fahd Stadium
- SPL: 2nd
- Crown Prince Cup: Winners
- King Cup of Champions: Quarter-finals
- Champions League: 2012: Quarter-finals; 2013: Round of 16
- Top goalscorer: League: Wesley (17); All: Wesley (20)
- Highest home attendance: 19,573 vs Ulsan Hyundai (3 October 2012, Champions League)
- Lowest home attendance: 1,349 vs Al-Wehda (8 March 2013, Pro League)
- Average home league attendance: 5,908
Home colours	Away colours

The 2012–13 Al-Hilal FC season was Al-Hilal Saudi Football Club's 56th in existence and 37th consecutive season in the top flight of Saudi Arabian football. Along with Pro League, the club participated in the AFC Champions League, Crown Prince Cup, and the King Cup of Champions.

== Players ==
=== Squad information ===
Players and squad numbers.
Note: Flags indicate national team as has been defined under FIFA eligibility rules. Players may hold more than one non-FIFA nationality.

No.	Nat.	Position	Name	Date of birth (age)
Goalkeepers
28	(Saudi Arabia)	GK	Abdullah Al-Sudairy	2 February 1992 (aged 21)
1	(Saudi Arabia)	GK	Khalid Sharhili	3 February 1987 (aged 26)
22	(Saudi Arabia)	GK	Fahad Al-Shamri	5 May 1981 (aged 32)
Defenders
2	(Saudi Arabia)	RB	Sultan Al-Bishi	28 January 1990 (aged 23)
3	(Saudi Arabia)	CB	Yahya Al-Musalem	7 January 1987 (aged 26)
4	(Saudi Arabia)	LB / CB	Abdullah Al-Zori	13 August 1987 (aged 25)
12	(Saudi Arabia)	LB / RB	Yasser Al-Shahrani	22 May 1992 (aged 21)
25	(Saudi Arabia)	CB	Majed Al Marshadi	1 November 1984 (aged 28)
33	(Brazil)	CB	Ozéia	2 January 1982 (aged 31)
19	(Saudi Arabia)	CB	Mohammad Nami	7 January 1982 (aged 31)
23	(Saudi Arabia)	CB	Hassan Khairat	8 March 1986 (aged 27)
34	(Saudi Arabia)	CB	Mohammad Massad	17 February 1983 (aged 30)
Midfielders
6	(Saudi Arabia)	DM / CM	Mohammed Al-Qarni	24 November 1989 (aged 23)
5	(Saudi Arabia)	CM / AM	Abdulatif Al-Ghanam	16 July 1985 (aged 27)
15	(Saudi Arabia)	RM	Ahmed Al-Fraidi	29 January 1988 (aged 25)
10	(Saudi Arabia)	AM / LW	Mohammad Al-Shalhoub	8 December 1980 (aged 32)
11	(Saudi Arabia)	AM / LM	Abdullaziz Al-Dawsari	11 October 1988 (aged 24)
13	(Saudi Arabia)	AM / LM / LW	Salman Al-Faraj (C)	8 January 1989 (aged 24)
8	(Brazil)	CM	Gustavo Bolívar	16 February 1985 (aged 28)
24	(Saudi Arabia)	LM / RM	Nawaf Al-Abed	26 January 1990 (aged 23)
29	(Saudi Arabia)	RM	Salem Al-Dawsari	19 August 1991 (aged 21)
Forwards
7	(South Korea)	ST / CF	Yoo Byung-soo	26 March 1988 (aged 25)
9	(Brazil)	ST / CF	Wesley	10 November 1980 (aged 32)
14	(Saudi Arabia)	RW	Saad Al-Harthi	3 February 1984 (aged 29)
20	(Saudi Arabia)	ST / CF	Yasser Al-Qahtani (C)	11 October 1982 (aged 30)

== Competitions ==
=== Overall ===
Competition	Started round	Final position / round	First match	Last match
Pro League	—	Runners-up	3 August 2012	27 April 2013
2012 ACL	Quarter-finals	Quarter-finals	19 September 2012	3 October 2012
Crown Prince Cup	Round of 16	Winners	19 December 2012	22 February 2013
2013 ACL	Group stage	Round of 16	27 February 2013	22 May 2013
King Cup of Champions	Quarter-finals	Quarter-finals	5 May 2013	9 May 2013

=== Overview ===
Competition	Record							
Competition	Pld	W	D	L	GF	GA	GD	Win %
Pro League	26	17	5	4	62	26	+36	65.38
King Cup of Champions	2	0	1	1	3	4	−1	0.00
Crown Prince Cup	4	3	1	0	6	2	+4	75.00
2012 ACL	2	0	0	2	0	5	−5	0.00
2013 ACL	8	4	1	3	12	9	+3	50.00
Total	42	24	8	10	83	46	+37	57.14

Source: Competitions

=== Pro League ===
==== League table ====
Pos	Team	Pld	W	D	L	GF	GA	GD	Pts	Qualification or relegation
1	Al-Fateh (C)	26	20	4	2	52	23	+29	64	Qualification to AFC Champions League group stage
2	Al-Hilal	26	17	5	4	62	26	+36	56	Qualification to AFC Champions League group stage
3	Al-Shabab	26	17	5	4	53	36	+17	56	Qualification to AFC Champions League group stage
4	Al-Nassr	26	14	8	4	41	24	+17	50	
5	Al-Ahli	26	12	8	6	51	33	+18	44	

Source: slstat.com
Rules for classification: 1) Points; 2) Head-to-head points; 3) Head-to-head goal difference; 4) Total goal difference; 5) Total goals scored; 6) Play-off (only for deciding champion, relegation and AFC competitions participation).
(C) Champions

==== Results summary ====
Overall								Home						Away					
Pld	W	D	L	GF	GA	GD	Pts	W	D	L	GF	GA	GD	W	D	L	GF	GA	GD
26	17	5	4	62	26	+36	56	9	2	2	31	10	+21	8	3	2	31	16	+15

Source: Competitive matches

==== Results by round ====
Round	1	2	3	4	5	6	7	8	9	10	11	12	13	14	15	16	17	18	19	20	21	22	23	24	25	26
Ground	A	H	A	H	A	A	H	H	A	H	A	H	H	A	A	H	A	H	H	A	A	H	H	A	H	A
Result	D	L	W	D	W	W	W	W	W	W	W	W	W	W	L	W	D	L	W	L	W	W	W	W	D	D
Position	4	9	6	7	4	3	2	2	2	2	2	2	2	1	2	2	2	2	2	2	2	2	2	2	2	2

Source: Competitive matches
A = Away; H = Home; W = Win; D = Draw; L = Loss

==== Matches ====
3 August 2012 1	Hajer	2–2	Al-Hilal	Al-Hasa
22:00 (UTC+03:00)	Atram 46'; Bu Haymid 48'	Report	87' Al-Dawsari; 91' Al-Qahtani	Stadium: Prince Abdullah bin Jalawi Stadium; Attendance: 4737; Referee: Meree Al-Awagi

7 August 2012 2	Al-Hilal	1–2	Al-Fateh	Riyadh
22:15 (UTC+03:00)	Al-Bishi 52'	Report	41' Doris; 87' Doris	Stadium: King Fahad International Stadium; Attendance: 7,435; Referee: Abdulrahman Al-Amri

23 August 2012 3	Najran	0–6	Al-Hilal	Najran
20:40 (UTC+03:00)		Report	54', 76', 90' Wesley; 65', 72' (pen.) Al-Qahtani; 82' Al-Faraj	Stadium: Al Akhdoud Club Stadium; Attendance: 3500; Referee: Sami Al-Nemri

27 August 2012 4	Al-Hilal	1–1	Al-Ettifaq	Riyadh
20:40 (UTC+03:00)	Wesley 48'	Report	92' Al-Salem	Stadium: Prince Faisal bin Fahd Stadium; Attendance: 7,385; Referee: Khalil Jalal

1 September 2012 5	Al-Nassr	1–3	Al-Hilal	Riyadh
20:35 (UTC+03:00)	Al-Sahlawi 31'	Report	21' Al-Zori; 60', 70' Wesley	Stadium: King Fahad International Stadium; Attendance: 14,162; Referee: Kever Saschai

14 September 2012 6	Al-Shoulla	1–3	Al-Hilal	Riyadh
20:25 (UTC+03:00)	Al-Bishi 82'	Report	20' Wesley; 86' Yoo Byung-Soo; 93' Al-Qarni	Stadium: Prince Faisal bin Fahd Stadium; Attendance: 3455; Referee: Mohammed Al-Hoaish

24 September 2012 7	Al-Hilal	3–0	Al-Shabab	Riyadh
20:15 (UTC+03:00)	Hermach 43'; Wesley 52'; Al-Qahtani 90'	Report		Stadium: King Fahad International Stadium; Attendance: 4052; Referee: Kircher Knut

28 September 2012 8	Al-Hilal	6–0	Al-Raed	Riyadh
20:10 (UTC+03:00)	Yoo Byung-Soo 11', 54'; Al-Qahtani 37', 74' (pen.), 85'; Al-Fraidi 83'	Report		Stadium: Prince Faisal bin Fahd Stadium; Attendance: 3570; Referee: Abdulrahman Al-Amri

7 October 2012 9	Al-Wehda	1–2	Al-Hilal	Makkah
20:00 (UTC+03:00)	Assiri 36' (pen.)	Report	11' (o.g.) Shengeeti; 22' (pen.) Wesley	Stadium: King Abdul Aziz Stadium; Attendance: 1,853; Referee: Khalil Jalal

1 November 2012 10	Al-Hilal	1–0	Al-Faisaly	Riyadh
19:15 (UTC+03:00)	Wesley 56' (pen.)	Report		Stadium: Prince Faisal bin Fahd Stadium; Attendance: 1,980; Referee: Saleh Al-Hathlool

10 November 2012 11	Al-Taawoun	1–4	Al-Hilal	Buraidah
19:40 (UTC+03:00)	Mefleh 26' (pen.)	Report	28' Al-Qahtani; 55' (pen.) Wesley; 83' Al-Shahrani; 91' Yoo Byung-Soo	Stadium: King Abdullah Sport City Stadium; Attendance: 7,397; Referee: Khalil Jalal

21 November 2012 12	Al-Hilal	4–1	Al-Ahli	Riyadh
19:35 (UTC+03:00)	Al-Faraj 26'; Wesley 52'; Al-Qahtani 54'; Yoo Byung-Soo 84'	Report	11' Moataz Al-Musa	Stadium: King Fahad International Stadium; Attendance: 12,179; Referee: Michael Weiner

4 December 2012 13	Al-Hilal	2–0	Hajer	Riyadh
19:35 (UTC+03:00)	Wesley 43' (pen.), 91'	Report		Stadium: Prince Faisal bin Fahd Stadium; Attendance: 2,800; Referee: Mishari Al-Mishari

9 December 2012 14	Al-Ittihad	1–2	Al-Hilal	Makkah
19:35 (UTC+03:00)	Al-Muwallad 70'	Report	51' (pen.) Wesley; 57' Yoo Byung-Soo	Stadium: King Abdul Aziz Stadium; Attendance: 25,026; Referee: Meree Al-Awagi

14 December 2012 15	Al-Fateh	2–1	Al-Hilal	Al-Hasa
14:55 (UTC+03:00)	Doris 57'; Élton 66' (pen.)	Report	79' Yoo Byung-Soo	Stadium: Prince Abdullah bin Jalawi Stadium; Attendance: 8,425; Referee: Abdulrahman Al-Amri

28 December 2012 16	Al-Hilal	3–1	Najran	Riyadh
15:15 (UTC+03:00)	Mangane 3', 57'; Yoo Byung-Soo 82'	Report	5' Wael Ayan	Stadium: Prince Faisal bin Fahd Stadium; Attendance: 3,783; Referee: Sami Al-Nemri

25 January 2013 17	Al-Ettifaq	2–2	Al-Hilal	Dammam
19:55 (UTC+03:00)	Al-Zori 61' (o.g.); Al-Zaqaan 93'	Report	37' Al-Dawsari; 66' Yoo Byung-Soo	Stadium: Prince Mohamed bin Fahd Stadium; Attendance: 9,740; Referee: Fahad Al-Mirdasi

30 January 2013 18	Al-Hilal	0–1	Al-Nassr	Riyadh
20:05 (UTC+03:00)		Report	13' Al-Shalawi	Stadium: King Fahad International Stadium; Attendance: 18,437; Referee: Thorsten Kinhoefer

14 February 2013 19	Al-Hilal	4–2	Al-Shoulla	Riyadh
20:15 (UTC+03:00)	Al-Faraj 1'; Al-Zaaq 11' (o.g.); Al-Qahtani 21'; Yoo Byung-Soo 82'	Report	41', 76' Lassana Fané	Stadium: King Fahad International Stadium; Attendance: 2,126; Referee: Mishari Al-Mishari

18 February 2013 20	Al-Shabab	3–2	Al-Hilal	Riyadh
20:15 (UTC+03:00)	Tagliabué 81', 86'; Assiri 90'	Report	46' Al-Qahtani; 89' Al-Shalhoub	Stadium: Prince Faisal bin Fahd Stadium; Attendance: 8,635; Referee: Stephan Studer

3 March 2013 21	Al-Raed	1–2	Al-Hilal	Buraidah
20:25 (UTC+03:00)	Darwish 86'	Report	9' Al-Qahtani; 74' Wesley	Stadium: King Abdullah Sport City Stadium; Attendance: 10,311; Referee: Meree Al-Awagi

8 March 2013 22	Al-Hilal	2–0	Al-Wehda	Riyadh
20:25 (UTC+03:00)	Wesley 14' (pen.); Al-Dawsari 52'	Report		Stadium: Prince Faisal bin Fahd Stadium; Attendance: 1,349; Referee: Turki Al-Khudair

29 March 2013 23	Al-Hilal	4–2	Al-Ittihad	Riyadh
20:35 (UTC+03:00)	Al-Abed 12', 58'; Al-Zori 65'; Al-Qahtani 68'	Report	30' Saud Kariri; 54' Al-Muwallad	Stadium: King Fahad International Stadium; Attendance: 10,352; Referee: Khalil Jalal

14 April 2013 24	Al-Faisaly	0–1	Al-Hilal	Al Majma'ah
20:35 (UTC+03:00)		Report	85' Al-Abed	Stadium: King Salman Sport City Stadium; Attendance: 2,050; Referee: Fahad Al-Mirdasi

18 April 2013 25	Al-Hilal	0–0	Al-Taawoun	Riyadh
20:40 (UTC+03:00)		Report		Stadium: Prince Faisal bin Fahd Stadium; Attendance: 1,352; Referee: Fahad Al-Oraini

27 April 2013 26	Al-Ahli	1–1	Al-Hilal	Makkah
20:40 (UTC+03:00)	Al-Hosani 13'	Report	18' Al-Dawsari	Stadium: King Abdul Aziz Stadium; Attendance: 3,528; Referee: Abdulaziz Al-Funaitel

=== Crown Prince Cup ===
19 December 2012 Round of 16	Najran	1–2	Al-Hilal	Najran
19:40 (UTC+03:00)	Al-Raheb 34'	Report	19' Hermach; 33' Yoo Byung-Soo	Stadium: Al Akhdoud Club Stadium; Referee: Abdulrahman Al-malki

23 December 2012 Quarter-finals	Al-Fateh	0–2	Al-Hilal	Al-Ahsa
19:40 (UTC+03:00)		Report	25' Hermach; 79' Wesley	Stadium: Prince Abdullah bin Jalawi Stadium; Referee: Khalil Jalal

9 February 2013 Semi-finals	Al-Faisaly	0–1	Al-Hilal	Al Majma'ah
18:30 (UTC+03:00)		Report	57' Al-Qahtani	Stadium: Prince Salman Bin Abdulaziz Sport City Stadium; Referee: Saleh Al-Hathloul

22 February 2013 Final	Al-Nassr	1–1 (a.e.t.) (2–4 p)	Al-Hilal	Riyadh
20:30 (UTC+03:00)	Al-Raheb 120'	Report	118' (pen.) Al-Shalhoub	Stadium: King Fahd International Stadium; Referee: Gianluca Rocchi (Italy)
	Penalties
	Abd Rabo (penalty missed); Ghaleb (penalty scored); Charisteas (penalty missed); Abdulghani (penalty scored)		(penalty scored) Al-Qahtani; (penalty scored) Ozéia de Paula; (penalty missed) M. Massad; (penalty scored) Al-Shalhoub; (penalty scored) Al Abed

=== King Cup of Champions ===
==== Quarter-finals ====
5 May 2013 First leg	Al-Ittihad	3–2	Al-Hilal	Makkah
20:45 (UTC+03:00)	Fallatah 34' (pen.), 46'; Al-Ghamdi 82'		5' Al-Shalhoub; 48' Wesley	Stadium: King Abdul Aziz Stadium; Referee: Khalil Jalal

9 May 2013 Second leg	Al-Hilal	1–1 (3–4 agg.)	Al-Ittihad	Riyadh
20:45 (UTC+03:00)	Al-Abed 7'		81' Al-Ghamdi	Stadium: King Fahd International Stadium; Referee: Marai Al-Awaji

=== 2012 AFC Champions League ===
==== Knockout stage ====
===== Quarter-finals =====
19 September 2012 First leg	Ulsan Hyundai (South Korea)	1–0	(Saudi Arabia) Al Hilal	Ulsan, South Korea
13:30 (UTC+03:00)	Rafinha 10'			Stadium: Ulsan Munsu Football Stadium; Attendance: 5,955; Referee: Ryuji Sato (Japan)

3 October 2012 Second leg	Al Hilal (Saudi Arabia)	0–4 (0–5 agg.)	(South Korea) Ulsan Hyundai	Riyadh, Saudi Arabia
20:10 (UTC+03:00)			24', 27' Rafinha; 54' Kim Shin-Wook; 65' Lee Keun-Ho	Stadium: Prince Faisal bin Fahd Stadium; Attendance: 19,573; Referee: Mohsen Torky (Iran)

=== 2013 AFC Champions League ===
==== Group stage ====
Pos	Team	Pld	W	D	L	GF	GA	GD	Pts	Qualification	EST	HIL	AIN	RAY
1	(Iran) Esteghlal	6	4	1	1	11	5	+6	13	knock-out stage	—	0–1	2–0	3–0
2	(Saudi Arabia) Al-Hilal	6	4	0	2	10	6	+4	12	knock-out stage	1–2	—	2–0	3–1
3	(United Arab Emirates) Al-Ain	6	2	0	4	6	9	−3	6		0–1	3–1	—	2–1
4	(Qatar) Al-Rayyan	6	1	1	4	7	14	−7	4		3–3	0–2	2–1	—

Source: AFC
Rules for classification: Group stage tiebreakers

27 February 2013 1	Al-Ain (United Arab Emirates)	3–1	(Saudi Arabia) Al-Hilal	Al Ain, UAE
19:15 (UTC+03:00)	Omar Abdulrahman 27'; Brosque 46'; Gyan 90+2'		9' Al-Zori	Stadium: Tahnoun bin Mohammed Stadium; Attendance: 8,819; Referee: Peter Green (Australia)

13 March 2013 2	Al-Hilal (Saudi Arabia)	3–1	(Qatar) Al-Rayyan	Riyadh, Saudi Arabia
20:35 (UTC+03:00)	Al-Qahtani 57', 74'; Al-Shalhoub 88'		86' Ismail	Stadium: Prince Faisal bin Fahd Stadium; Attendance: 11,090; Referee: Abdullah Al Hilali (Oman)

3 April 2013 3	Al-Hilal (Saudi Arabia)	1–2	(Iran) Esteghlal	Riyadh, Saudi Arabia
20:40 (UTC+03:00)	S. Al-Dawsari 68'		80' Montazeri; 86' Borhani	Stadium: Prince Faisal bin Fahd Stadium; Attendance: 11,475; Referee: Nawaf Shukralla (Bahrain)

9 April 2013 4	Esteghlal (Iran)	0–1	(Saudi Arabia) Al-Hilal	Tahran, Iran
17:00 (UTC+03:00)			35' Al Abed	Stadium: Azadi Stadium; Attendance: 80,300; Referee: Abdul Malik Abdul Bashir (Singapore)

23 April 2013 5	Al-Hilal (Saudi Arabia)	2–0	(United Arab Emirates) Al-Ain	Riyadh, Saudi Arabia
20:50 (UTC+03:00)	Al-Dossari 4'; Wesley 24'			Stadium: Prince Faisal bin Fahd Stadium; Attendance: 13,067; Referee: Vladislav Tseytlin (Uzbekistan)

30 April 2013 6	Al-Rayyan (Qatar)	0–2	(Saudi Arabia) Al-Hilal	Doha, Qatar
18:50 (UTC+03:00)			78' Al Abed; 83' Al-Harthi	Stadium: Ahmed bin Ali Stadium; Attendance: 5,563; Referee: Minoru Tōjō (Japan)

==== Knockout stage ====
===== Round of 16 =====
15 May 2013 First leg	Al-Hilal (Saudi Arabia)	0–1	(Qatar) Lekhwiya	Riyadh, Saudi Arabia
21:00 (UTC+03:00)			81' Msakni	Stadium: Prince Faisal bin Fahd Stadium; Attendance: 14,810; Referee: Kim Dong-Jin (South Korea)

22 May 2013 Second leg	Lekhwiya (Qatar)	2–2 (3–2 agg.)	(Saudi Arabia) Al-Hilal	Doha, Qatar
18:30 (UTC+03:00)	Dia 14'; Musa 52'		64' Al-Faraj; 78' (pen.) Al-Shalhoub	Stadium: Abdullah bin Khalifa Stadium; Attendance: 10,221; Referee: Peter Green (Australia)

== Statistics ==
=== Goalscorers ===
Rank	No.	Pos	Nat	Name	Pro League	King Cup	Crown Prince Cup	2013 ACL	Total
1	9	FW	(Brazil)	Wesley	17	1	0	2	20
2	20	FW	(Saudi Arabia)	Yasser Al Qahtani	13	0	1	2	16
3	7	FW	(South Korea)	Yoo Byung-Soo	10	0	1	0	11
4	24	MF	(Saudi Arabia)	Nawaf Al-Abed	3	1	0	2	6
5	29	MF	(Saudi Arabia)	Salem Al-Dawsari	3	0	0	2	5
5	10	MF	(Saudi Arabia)	Mohammad Al-Shalhoub	1	1	1	2	5
6	13	MF	(Saudi Arabia)	Salman Al-Faraj	3	0	0	1	4
7	21	MF	(Morocco)	Adil Hermach	1	0	2	0	3
7	4	DF	(Saudi Arabia)	Abdullah Al-Zori	2	0	0	1	3
8	11	MF	(Saudi Arabia)	Abdullaziz Al-Dawsari	2	0	0	0	2
8	8	DF	(Senegal)	Kader Mangane	2	0	0	0	2
9	14	FW	(Saudi Arabia)	Saad Al-Harthi	0	0	0	1	1
9	12	DF	(Saudi Arabia)	Yasser Al-Shahrani	1	0	0	0	1
9	15	MF	(Saudi Arabia)	Ahmed Al-Fraidi	1	0	0	0	1
9	6	MF	(Saudi Arabia)	Mohammed Al-Qarni	1	0	0	0	1
9	2	DF	(Saudi Arabia)	Sultan Al-Bishi	1	0	0	0	1
Total					61	3	5	13	82

=== Assists ===
Rank	No.	Pos	Nat	Name	League	King Cup	Crown Prince Cup	2013 CL	Total
1	12	DF	(Saudi Arabia)	Yasser Al-Shahrani	3	2	1	1	7
1	24	MF	(Saudi Arabia)	Nawaf Al-Abed	4	0	0	3	7
1	29	MF	(Saudi Arabia)	Salem Al-Dawsari	4	0	1	2	7
2	11	MF	(Saudi Arabia)	Abdullaziz Al-Dawsari	4	0	1	0	5
2	10	MF	(Saudi Arabia)	Mohammad Al-Shalhoub	3	1	0	1	5
3	20	FW	(Saudi Arabia)	Yasser Al Qahtani	2	0	0	1	3
3	13	MF	(Saudi Arabia)	Salman Al-Faraj	3	0	0	0	3
3	21	MF	(Morocco)	Adil Hermach	2	0	1	0	3
3	9	FW	(Brazil)	Wesley	3	0	0	0	3
4	15	MF	(Saudi Arabia)	Ahmed Al-Fraidi	2	0	0	0	2
4	4	DF	(Saudi Arabia)	Abdullah Al-Zori	2	0	0	0	2
4	14	FW	(Saudi Arabia)	Saad Al-Harthi	2	0	0	0	2
4	19	DF	(Saudi Arabia)	Mohammad Nami	2	0	0	0	2
5	6	MF	(Saudi Arabia)	Mohammed Al-Qarni	1	0	0	0	1
5	2	DF	(Saudi Arabia)	Sultan Al-Bishi	1	0	0	0	1
Total					34	3	5	11	53
