= Abdullah Al-Zori =

Saudi Arabian footballer

Personal information
- Full name: Abdullah Mohammed Al-Zori Al-Dossary
- Date of birth: August 13, 1987 (age 39)
- Place of birth: Riyadh, Saudi Arabia
- Height: 1.84 m (6 ft 1/2 in)
- Position: Left-back

Youth career
- Al-Nahda

Senior career*
Years	Team	Apps	(Gls)
2006–2018	Al-Hilal	172	(13)
2018–2020	Al-Wehda	34	(1)
2020–2022	Al-Shabab	38	(2)
2022–2023	Abha	32	(2)
2023–2024	Al-Qadsiah	5	(0)

International career^{‡}
2008–2018	Saudi Arabia	58	(1)
- * Club domestic league appearances and goals as of 18:16, 6 April 2023 (UTC) ‡ National team caps and goals as of 12:38, 13 April 2018 (UTC)

Abdullah Al-Zori Al-Dossary (Arabic: عبد الله الزوري الدوسري; born 13 August 1987) is a Saudi Arabian professional footballer who currently plays as a left back. He is the son of former Al-Nahda player Mohammed Al-Zori Al-Dossary.

== Career ==
Al-Zori began his career with Al-Nahda and joined Al-Hilal in 2006. Al-Zori won 15 titles with Al-Hilal between 2006 and 2018, and made 315 appearances for the club across all competitions. On 27 May 2018, he joined Al-Wehda on a free transfer. After one and a half seasons with the club, Al-Zori left Al-Wehda and joined Al-Shabab on 30 January 2020. On 28 January 2022, Al-Zori joined Abha on a six-month contract. On 1 August 2023, Al-Zori joined Saudi First Division League club Al-Qadsiah.

Al-Zori made 58 appearances for the Saudi Arabia national team between 2008 and 2018, being selected for two Arabian Gulf Cup squads and the 2015 AFC Asian Cup.

== Career statistics ==
=== Club ===
As of match played 28 May 2024

Club	Season	League		National Cup		League Cup		Continental		Other		Total	
Club	Season	Apps	Goals	Apps	Goals	Apps	Goals	Apps	Goals	Apps	Goals	Apps	Goals
Al-Hilal	2006–07	1	0	—		0	0	2	0	—		3	0
Al-Hilal	2007–08	14	2	5	0	2	0	—		4 (Note: Appearances in GCC Champions League)	0	25	2
Al-Hilal	2008–09	18	1	4	0	4	0	7	0	—		33	1
Al-Hilal	2009–10	20	0	3	0	4	0	7	0	—		34	0
Al-Hilal	2011–12	9	0	5	0	2	1	6	1	—		22	2
Al-Hilal	2011–12	19	2	5	0	2	0	7	1	—		33	3
Al-Hilal	2012–13	23	1	1	0	3	0	7	1	—		34	2
Al-Hilal	2013–14	17	1	3	0	3	0	13	0	—		36	1
Al-Hilal	2014–15	19	1	4	0	2	0	10	1	—		35	2
Al-Hilal	2015–16	21	5	2	1	4	0	6	1	0	0	33	7
Al-Hilal	2016–17	5	0	3	0	0	0	8	1	0	0	16	1
Al-Hilal	2017–18	6	0	2	0	—		5	1	—		13	1
Al-Hilal	Total	172	13	37	1	26	1	78	7	4	0	317	22
Al-Wehda	2018–19	22	1	3	0	—		—		—		25	1
Al-Wehda	2019–20	12	0	3	1	—		—		—		15	1
Al-Wehda	Total	34	1	6	1	0	0	0	0	0	0	40	2
Al-Shabab	2019–20	13	1	0	0	—		—		0	0	13	1
Al-Shabab	2020–21	22	1	0	0	—		—		—		22	1
Al-Shabab	2021–22	3	0	0	0	—		0	0	—		3	0
Al-Shabab	Total	38	2	0	0	0	0	0	0	0	0	38	2
Abha	2021–22	10	0	0	0	—		—		—		10	0
Abha	2022–23	22	2	1	0	—		—		—		23	2
Abha	Total	32	2	1	0	0	0	0	0	0	0	33	2
Al-Qadsiah	2023–24	5	0	0	0	—		—		—		5	0
Career totals		281	18	44	2	26	1	78	7	4	0	433	28

=== International goals ===
Scores and results list Saudi Arabia's goal tally first.

#	Date	Venue	Opponent	Score	Result	Competition
1.	11 January 2009	Sultan Qaboos Sports Complex, Muscat, Oman	United Arab Emirates	2–0	3–0	19th Arabian Gulf Cup

== Honours ==
- Al-Hilal:
  - Saudi Professional League (5): 2007–08, 2009–10, 2010–11, 2016–17, 2017–18
  - King Cup (2): 2015, 2017
  - Crown Prince Cup (7): 2007–08, 2008–09, 2009–10, 2010–11, 2011–12, 2012–13, 2015–16
  - Saudi Super Cup (1): 2015
  - AFC Champions League: Runner-up 2014, 2017
- Al-Qadsiah:
  - Saudi First Division League (1): 2023–24

=== International ===
- Arabian Gulf Cup Runner-up (2): 2009, 2014
