= Abdullaziz Al-Dawsari =

Saudi Arabian footballer

Personal information
- Full name: Abdullaziz Saeed Al-Dawsari
- Date of birth: 11 October 1988 (age 38)
- Place of birth: Dammam, Saudi Arabia
- Height: 1.73 m (5 ft 8 in)
- Position: Winger

Youth career
- Al-Hilal

Senior career*
Years	Team	Apps	(Gls)
2007–2018	Al-Hilal	117	(10)
2018	→ Al-Qadsiah (loan)	3	(0)
2019–2020	Al-Faisaly	10	(0)
2020–2021	Al-Nassr	12	(1)
2022	Al-Riyadh		

International career^{‡}
2010–2012	Saudi Arabia	19	(0)
- * Club domestic league appearances and goals as of 10:36, 3 June 2017 (UTC) ‡ National team caps and goals as of 10:36, 3 June 2017 (UTC)

Abdullaziz Saeed Al-Dawsari (Arabic: عبد العزيز سعيد الدوسري; born 11 October 1988) is a Saudi professional footballer who plays as a winger. He has represented the Saudi Arabia national team in various competitions since 2010. In 2012, Al-Dosari was featured on the cover of the Middle Eastern edition of FIFA 13, alongside Lionel Messi and Joe Hart.

On 12 June 2022, Al-Dawsari joined First Division side Al-Riyadh.

== Career statistics ==
=== Club ===
As of match played 30 May 2021

Club	Season	League		King Cup		Crown Prince Cup		Asia		Other		Total	
Club	Season	Apps	Goals	Apps	Goals	Apps	Goals	Apps	Goals	Apps	Goals	Apps	Goals
Al-Hilal	2007–08	2	0	0	0	0	0	—		—		2	0
Al-Hilal	2008–09	5	0	1	0	0	0	0	0	—		6	0
Al-Hilal	2009–10	7	1	2	0	0	0	4	0	—		13	1
Al-Hilal	2010–11	19	3	5	1	3	0	6	1	—		33	5
Al-Hilal	2011–12	14	2	0	0	2	1	2	0	—		18	3
Al-Hilal	2012–13	14	1	0	0	3	0	0	0	—		16	1
Al-Hilal	2013–14	20	2	3	1	3	0	7	0	—		33	3
Al-Hilal	2014–15	19	0	2	0	2	0	5	1	—		28	1
Al-Hilal	2015–16	18	1	2	0	3	0	3	0	1 (Note: Appearances in Saudi Super Cup)	0	27	1
Al-Hilal	2016–17	0	0	0	0	0	0	0	0	0	0	0	0
Al-Hilal	Total	118	10	15	2	16	1	27	2	1	0	176	15
Al-Qadsiah (loan)	2017–18	3	0	1	0	—		—		—		4	0
Al-Faisaly	2019–20	10	0	3	0	—		—		—		13	0
Al-Nassr	2019–20	7	1	0	0	—		4	0	—		11	1
Al-Nassr	2020–21	5	0	0	0	—		4	0	0	0	9	0
Al-Nassr	Total	12	1	0	0	0	0	8	0	0	0	20	1
Career totals		143	11	19	2	16	1	35	2	1	0	214	16

== Honours ==
=== Al-Hilal ===
- Saudi Pro League: 2007–08, 2009–10, 2010–11
- King Cup: 2015
- Crown Prince Cup: 2007–08, 2008–2009, 2009–2010, 2010–11, 2011–12, 2012–13, 2015–16
- Super Cup: 2015

=== Al-Nassr ===
- Super Cup: 2020
