= Nawaf Al-Abed =

Saudi Arabian footballer (born 1990)

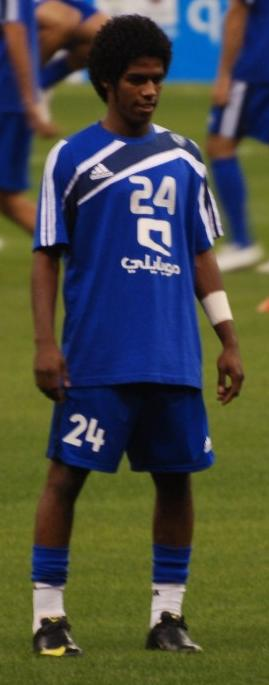
- Al-Abed with Al-Hilal in 2016

Personal information
- Full name: Nawaf Shaker Fayrouz Al-Abed
- Date of birth: 26 January 1990 (age 36)
- Place of birth: Riyadh, Saudi Arabia
- Height: 1.69 m (5 ft 7 in)
- Position: Midfielder

Youth career
- 2005–2009: Al-Hilal

Senior career*
Years	Team	Apps	(Gls)
2009–2020	Al-Hilal	146	(25)
2020–2023	Al-Shabab	41	(3)
2024	Al-Qadsiah	3	(0)
2024–2025	Al-Riyadh	14	(0)

International career^{‡}
2008–2010	Saudi Arabia U20		
2011–2012	Saudi Arabia U23		
2011–2022	Saudi Arabia	57	(8)
- * Club domestic league appearances and goals as of 22:29 26 May 2025 (UTC) ‡ National team caps and goals as of 16:31 26 November 2022 (UTC)

Nawaf Shaker Fayrouz Al-Abed (Arabic: نَوَّاف شَاكِر فَيْرُوز الْعَابِد; born 26 January 1990) is a Saudi Arabian professional footballer who plays as a winger.

== Club career ==
=== Al-Hilal ===
In 2009, Al-Hilal signed in Al-Abed from their youth academy. On 7 November, Nawaf scored the fastest goal in professional football against Al-Shoulla in two seconds in the Prince Faisal U-21 Cup, but the match was cancelled due to Al-Hilal playing with 6 players who were older than 21.

On 9 March 2017, Al-Abed scored a third penalty goal against Ittihad was banned by the Saudi Arabian FA for two games due to the celebration he performed. However, this ban was lifted following an appeal from Al-Hilal.

=== Al-Shabab ===
On 25 October 2020, Al-Abed joined Al-Shabab on a three-year contract.

On 18 April 2023, Al-Abed was released by Al-Shabab.

=== Al-Qadsiah ===
On 11 February 2024, Al-Abed joined Saudi First Division League side Al-Qadsiah on a six-month contract.

=== Al-Riyadh ===
On 22 July 2024, Al-Abed joined Pro League side Al-Riyadh.

== International career ==
Al-Abed represented the Saudi Arabia national football team when his country hosted the 22nd Arabian Gulf Cup. His first international goal came in the quarter-final match with Yemen, becoming the winning goal as the Saudis prevailed 1–0. Nawaf scored again in the semi-final as Saudi Arabia defeated the United Arab Emirates 3–2. The Green Falcons eventually finished as runners-up to Qatar, losing 2–1 in the final at the King Fahd International Stadium.

Al-Abed was included in Saudi Arabia's squad for the 2015 AFC Asian Cup, scoring his third international goal in a 4–1 defeat of North Korea in the team's second group match.

In May 2018 he was named in Saudi Arabia's preliminary squad for the 2018 World Cup in Russia.

== Career statistics ==
=== Club ===
As of match played 28 May 2024

Club	Season	League		King Cup		Crown Prince Cup		Asia		Other		Total	
Club	Season	Apps	Goals	Apps	Goals	Apps	Goals	Apps	Goals	Apps	Goals	Apps	Goals
Al-Hilal	2008–09	1	0	0	0	0	0	0	0	—		1	0
Al-Hilal	2009–10	9	2	3	1	4	0	9	0	—		25	3
Al-Hilal	2010–11	13	2	0	0	2	1	5	0	—		20	3
Al-Hilal	2011–12	13	3	2	0	4	4	6	1	—		25	8
Al-Hilal	2012–13	15	3	1	1	1	0	8	1	—		25	5
Al-Hilal	2013–14	20	1	1	0	2	0	7	0	—		30	1
Al-Hilal	2014–15	15	2	3	1	4	0	9	1	—		31	4
Al-Hilal	2015–16	11	1	2	0	1	1	5	0	0	0	19	2
Al-Hilal	2016–17	18	7	3	0	2	2	10	1	1 (Note: Appearances in Saudi Super Cup)	0	34	10
Al-Hilal	2017–18	11	0	0	0	—		1	0	—		12	0
Al-Hilal	2018–19	7	2	3	0	—		6	0	3 (Note: Appearances in Arab Club Champions Cup)	0	19	2
Al-Hilal	2019–20	13	2	2	0	—		1	0	1 (Note: Appearances in FIFA Club World Cup)	0	17	2
Al-Hilal	Total	146	25	20	3	20	8	67	4	5	0	258	40
Al-Shabab	2020–21	19	2	0	0	—		—		2	0	21	2
Al-Shabab	2021–22	13	1	2	0	—		6	1	—		21	2
Al-Shabab	2022–23	9	0	0	0	—		0	0	0	0	9	0
Al-Shabab	Total	41	3	2	0	0	0	6	1	2	0	51	4
Al-Qadsiah	2023–24	3	0	0	0	—		—		–		3	0
Career totals		190	28	22	3	20	8	73	5	7	0	312	44

=== International ===
==== International goals ====
Scores and results list Saudi Arabia's goal tally first.

#	Date	Venue	Opponent	Score	Result	Competition
1	19 November 2014	King Fahd International Stadium, Riyadh	Yemen	1–0	1–0	22nd Arabian Gulf Cup
2	23 November 2014	King Fahd International Stadium, Riyadh	United Arab Emirates	2–0	3–2	22nd Arabian Gulf Cup
3	14 January 2015	Melbourne Rectangular Stadium, Melbourne	North Korea	4–1	4–1	2015 AFC Asian Cup
4	1 September 2016	King Fahd International Stadium, Riyadh	Thailand	1–0	1–0	2018 FIFA World Cup qualification
5	6 September 2016	Shah Alam Stadium, Shah Alam	Iraq	1–1	2–1	2018 FIFA World Cup qualification
6	6 September 2016	Shah Alam Stadium, Shah Alam	Iraq	2–1	2–1	2018 FIFA World Cup qualification
7	11 October 2016	King Abdullah Sports City, Jeddah	United Arab Emirates	2–0	3–0	2018 FIFA World Cup qualification
8	29 August 2017	Hazza Bin Zayed Stadium, Al Ain	United Arab Emirates	1–0	1–2	2018 FIFA World Cup qualification

== Honours ==
Al-Hilal

- Saudi Professional League: 2009–10, 2010–11, 2016–17, 2017–18, 2019–20
- King Cup of Champions: 2015, 2017
- Saudi Crown Prince Cup: 2008–09, 2009–10, 2010–11, 2011–12, 2012–13, 2015–16
- Saudi Super Cup: 2015, 2018
- AFC Champions League: 2019

Al-Qadsiah

- First Division League: 2023–24

== See also ==
- Fastest goals in association football
