= 2014–15 Al-Hilal FC season =

Al Hilal
2014–15 season
- President: (Saudi Arabia) Abdulrahman bin Musa'ad (until 14 February 2015) (Saudi Arabia) Mohammad Al-Homaidani (until end of the season)
- Manager: (Romania) Laurențiu Reghecampf (until 15 February 2015) (Romania) Marius Ciprian (caretaker) (16–28 February 2015) (Greece) Georgios Donis (from 1 March 2015)
- Stadium: King Fahd Stadium; Prince Faisal bin Fahd Stadium
- SPL: 3rd
- Crown Prince Cup: Runners-up
- King Cup: Winners
- Champions League: 2014: Runners-up; 2015: Quarter-finals^{1}
- Top goalscorer: League: Nasser Al-Shamrani (13); All: Nasser Al-Shamrani (24)
- Highest home attendance: 63,763 vs W.S. Wanderers (1 November 2014, Champions League)
- Lowest home attendance: 2,677 vs Hajer (15 May 2015, Pro League)
- Average home league attendance: 13,007
Home colours	Away colours

The 2014–15 season was the Al-Hilal Saudi Football Club's 58th in existence and 39th consecutive season in the top flight of Saudi Arabian football. Along with Pro League, the club participated in the AFC Champions League, Crown Prince Cup, and the King Cup.

== Players ==
=== Squad information ===
Players and squad numbers.
Note: Flags indicate national team as has been defined under FIFA eligibility rules. Players may hold more than one non-FIFA nationality.

No.	Nat.	Position	Name	Date of birth (age)	Moving from
Goalkeepers
1	(Saudi Arabia)	GK	Khalid Sharhili	3 February 1987 (aged 28)	Youth system
22	(Saudi Arabia)	GK	Fahad Al-Thunayan	26 August 1986 (aged 28)	(Saudi Arabia) Al-Taawon
28	(Saudi Arabia)	GK	Abdullah Al-Sudairy	2 February 1992 (aged 23)	Youth system
32	(Saudi Arabia)	GK	Fayz Al-Sabiay	9 October 1982 (aged 32)	(Saudi Arabia) Al-Ettifaq
Defenders
2	(Saudi Arabia)	RB	Sultan Al-Bishi	28 January 1990 (aged 25)	Youth system
3	(Saudi Arabia)	CB	Yahya Al-Musalem	7 January 1987 (aged 28)	(Saudi Arabia) Al-Raed
4	(Saudi Arabia)	LB / CB	Abdullah Al-Zori	13 August 1987 (aged 27)	(Saudi Arabia) Al-Nahda
12	(Saudi Arabia)	LB / RB	Yasser Al-Shahrani	22 May 1992 (aged 23)	(Saudi Arabia) Al-Qadisiyah
17	(Saudi Arabia)	CB	Abdullah Al-Hafith	25 December 1992 (aged 22)	(Saudi Arabia) Al-Ettifaq
23	(South Korea)	CB	Kwak Tae-Hwi	8 July 1981 (aged 33)	(Saudi Arabia) Al-Shabab
26	(Brazil)	CB	Digão	7 May 1988 (aged 27)	(Brazil) Fluminense
33	(Saudi Arabia)	CB	Sultan Al-Deayea	8 March 1993 (aged 22)	Youth system
35	(Saudi Arabia)	CB	Ahmed Sharahili	5 August 1994 (aged 20)	Youth system
49	(Saudi Arabia)	LB	Abdullah Al-Shamekh	28 May 1993 (aged 22)	Youth system
70	(Saudi Arabia)	CB / RB	Mohammed Jahfali	24 October 1990 (aged 24)	(Saudi Arabia) Al-Faisaly
Midfielders
6	(Saudi Arabia)	DM / CM	Mohammed Al-Qarni	24 November 1989 (aged 25)	Youth system
7	(Brazil)	CM / AM	Thiago Neves	27 February 1985 (aged 30)	(Brazil) Fluminense
9	(Saudi Arabia)	RM	Hamed Al-Hamed	26 August 1987 (aged 27)	(Saudi Arabia) Al-Ettifaq
10	(Saudi Arabia)	AM / LW	Mohammad Al-Shalhoub	8 December 1980 (aged 34)	Youth system
11	(Saudi Arabia)	AM / LM	Abdullaziz Al-Dawsari	11 October 1988 (aged 26)	Youth system
13	(Saudi Arabia)	AM / LM / LW	Salman Al-Faraj (C)	8 January 1989 (aged 26)	Youth system
14	(Saudi Arabia)	CM	Saud Kariri	8 June 1980 (aged 35)	(Saudi Arabia) Al-Ittihad
18	(Saudi Arabia)	DM	Abdullah Otayf	3 August 1992 (aged 22)	(Saudi Arabia) Al-Shabab
24	(Saudi Arabia)	LM / RM	Nawaf Al-Abed	26 January 1990 (aged 25)	Youth system
25	(Saudi Arabia)	CM	Faisel Darwish	3 July 1991 (aged 23)	(Saudi Arabia) Al-Raed
29	(Saudi Arabia)	RM	Salem Al-Dawsari	19 August 1991 (aged 23)	Youth system
36	(Saudi Arabia)	CM	Abdullah Al-Ammar	1 March 1994 (aged 21)	Youth system
39	(Saudi Arabia)	CM	Abdulellah Al-Fadhl	27 March 1992 (aged 23)	Youth system
Forwards
15	(Saudi Arabia)	ST / CF	Nasser Al-Shamrani	23 November 1983 (aged 31)	(Saudi Arabia) Al-Shabab
16	(Saudi Arabia)	ST / CF	Yousef Al-Salem	4 May 1985 (aged 30)	(Saudi Arabia) Al-Ettifaq
19	(Saudi Arabia)	RW	Khalid Ka'abi	24 May 1992 (aged 23)	Youth system
20	(Saudi Arabia)	ST / CF	Yasser Al-Qahtani (C)	11 October 1982 (aged 32)	(Saudi Arabia) Al-Qadisiyah
77	(Greece)	ST / RW	Georgios Samaras	21 February 1985 (aged 30)	(England) West Bromwich Albion

== Pre-season and friendlies ==
16 July 2014 Friendly	Al Hilal (Saudi Arabia)	3–0	(Ukraine) Dynamo Kyiv	Wörgl, Austria
19:05 (UTC+03:00)	Al-Shalhoub 19' (pen.); Al-Qahtani 57'; Neves 87'

19 July 2014 Friendly	Al Hilal (Saudi Arabia)	0–3	(Spain) Athletic Bilbao	Wörgl, Austria
20:05 (UTC+03:00)			3' Fernández; 75', 78' Aduriz	Stadium: Sportzentrum; Referee: Georg Hofer, (Austria)

21 July 2014 Friendly	Al Hilal (Saudi Arabia)	3–1	(Latvia) Jūrmala	Mierlo, Netherlands
20:48 (UTC+03:00)	Ka'abi 61', 73'; Al-Shalhoub 67'		88'

23 July 2014 Friendly	Al Hilal (Saudi Arabia)	0–0	(Italy) Genoa	Salzburg, Austria
18:23 (UTC+03:00)

17 January 2015 Friendly	Al Hilal (Saudi Arabia)	1–4	(Germany) Bayern Munich	Riyadh, Saudi Arabia
20:00 (UTC+03:00)	A. Al-Dawsari 90'	Report	9' Dante; 11' Schweinsteiger; 39' Lewandowski; 62' Pizarro	Stadium: King Fahd International Stadium; Referee: Fahad Al-Marri, (Qatar)

== Competitions ==
=== Overall ===
Competition	Started round	Final position / round	First match	Last match
Pro League	—	3rd	8 August 2014	15 May 2015
2014 ACL	Quarter-final	Runners-up	19 August 2014	1 November 2014
Crown Prince Cup	Round of 16	Runners-up	23 December 2014	13 February 2015
2015 ACL	Group stage	Round of 16^{1}	25 February 2015	26 May 2015
King Cup	Round of 32	Winners	10 March 2015	5 June 2015

Notes

- Note 1: Al-Hilal qualified to the Quarter-finals.

=== Overview ===
Competition	Record							
Competition	Pld	W	D	L	GF	GA	GD	Win %
Pro League	26	16	6	4	46	17	+29	61.54
King Cup	5	4	1	0	18	5	+13	80.00
Crown Prince Cup	4	3	0	1	10	4	+6	75.00
2014 ACL	6	2	2	2	5	3	+2	33.33
2015 ACL	8	5	1	2	12	5	+7	62.50
Total	49	30	10	9	91	34	+57	61.22

Source: Competitions

=== Pro League ===
==== League table ====
Pos	Team	Pld	W	D	L	GF	GA	GD	Pts	Qualification or relegation
1	Al-Nassr (C)	26	20	4	2	62	20	+42	64	Qualification for the AFC Champions League group stage
2	Al-Ahli	26	17	9	0	59	22	+37	60	Qualification for the AFC Champions League group stage
3	Al-Hilal	26	16	6	4	46	17	+29	54	Qualification for the AFC Champions League group stage
4	Al-Ittihad	26	16	4	6	44	33	+11	52	Qualification for the AFC Champions League play-off round (Note: As winners of the 2015 King Cup, Al-Hilal, qualified for AFC Champions League group stage thus the spot for the third-placed team (AFC Champions League play-off round) is passed down to the fourth-placed team.)
5	Al-Shabab	26	11	7	8	37	31	+6	40	

Updated to match(es) played on 18 May 2015. Source: SLstat
Rules for classification: 1) Points; 2) Head-to-head points; 3) Head-to-head goal difference; 4) Total goal difference; 5) Total goals scored; 6) Fair-play points (Note: Head-to-head record is used only after all the matches between the teams in question have been played).
(C) Champions

==== Results summary ====
Overall								Home						Away					
Pld	W	D	L	GF	GA	GD	Pts	W	D	L	GF	GA	GD	W	D	L	GF	GA	GD
26	16	6	4	46	17	+29	54	10	1	2	31	8	+23	6	5	2	15	9	+6

Source: Competitive matches

==== Results by round ====
Round	1	2	3	4	5	6	7	8	9	10	11	12	13	14	15	16	17	18	19	20	21	22	23	24	25	26
Ground	A	H	H	H	H	A	H	H	A	A	H	A	A	H	A	A	A	A	H	A	A	H	H	A	H	H
Result	W	W	D	W	W	W	L	W	D	D	W	L	D	W	L	D	W	W	W	W	W	W	W	D	L	W
Position	3	1	4	4	3	3	4	4	5	5	3	4	4	3	3	4	4	4	4	4	3	3	3	3	3	3

Source: Competitive matches
A = Away; H = Home; W = Win; D = Draw; L = Loss

==== Matches ====
8 August 2014 2	Al Hilal	4–1	Al-Orobah	Riyadh
20:45 (UTC+03:00)	Al-Faraj 39'; Neves 44', 89'; Al-Shamrani 73'	Report	70' Al-Enezi	Stadium: King Fahad International Stadium; Attendance: 13,844; Referee: Abdulrahman Al-Amri

13 August 2014 1	Al-Shoalah	1–3	Al Hilal	Al-Kharj
20:50 (UTC+03:00)	Al-Bishi 49'	Report	36' Neves; 40' Al-Qahtani; 84' Al-Faraj	Stadium: Al-Shoalah Club Stadium; Attendance: 3,864; Referee: Marai Al-Awaji

31 August 2014 3	Al Hilal	0–0	Al-Ahli	Riyadh
20:40 (UTC+03:00)		Report		Stadium: King Fahad International Stadium; Attendance: 17,069; Referee: Abdulrahman Al-Amri

12 September 2014 4	Al Hilal	2–1	Najran	Riyadh
20:25 (UTC+03:00)	Al-Shamrani 16', 36' (pen.)	Report	90+3' Wahib	Stadium: King Fahad International Stadium; Attendance: 10,087; Referee: Turki Al-Khudair

19 September 2014 5	Al Hilal	3–0	Al-Khaleej	Riyadh
20:20 (UTC+03:00)	Neves 3'; Al-Qahtani 6', 17'	Report		Stadium: Prince Faisal bin Fahd Stadium; Attendance: 10,564; Referee: Mohammed Al-Hoaish

24 September 2014 6	Al-Fateh	1–2	Al Hilal	Al-Hasa
20:15 (UTC+03:00)	Doris 63'	Report	6' S. Al-Dawsari; 83' (o.g.) Sufyani	Stadium: Prince Abdullah bin Jalawi Stadium; Attendance: 10,560; Referee: Saleh Al-Hathlool

17 October 2014 7	Al Hilal	0–1	Al-Shabab	Riyadh
19:55 (UTC+03:00)		Report	90+1' Park	Stadium: Prince Faisal bin Fahd Stadium; Attendance: 16,721; Referee: (Poland) Marcin Borski

1 December 2014 10	Al-Ittihad	0–0	Al Hilal	Jeddah
19:45 (UTC+03:00)		Report		Stadium: King Abdullah Sports City; Attendance: 60,134; Referee: (France) Stéphane Lannoy

5 December 2014 11	Al Hilal	3–1	Al-Raed	Riyadh
19:35 (UTC+03:00)	Al-Shamrani 6' (pen.); Al-Abed 40', 64'	Report	71' (pen.) Meshal Al-Enazi	Stadium: Prince Faisal bin Fahd Stadium; Attendance: 8,098; Referee: Mohammed Al-Hoaish

9 December 2014 8	Al Hilal	3–1	Al-Taawon	Riyadh
19:35 (UTC+03:00)	Al-Shamrani 21', 33'; Al-Zori 28'	Report	39' Efoulou	Stadium: Prince Faisal bin Fahd Stadium; Attendance: 7,615; Referee: Marai Al-Awaji

13 December 2014 12	Al-Nassr	1–0	Al Hilal	Riyadh
19:40 (UTC+03:00)	Al-Sahlawi 69' (pen.)	Report		Stadium: King Fahad International Stadium; Attendance: 20,722; Referee: (Czech Republic) Libor Kovařík

19 December 2014 13	Hajer	1–1	Al Hilal	Al-Hasa
17:30 (UTC+03:00)	Soumah 9' (pen.)	Report	53' Kwak	Stadium: Prince Abdullah bin Jalawi Stadium; Attendance: 4,188; Referee: Abdulrahman Al-Sultan

28 January 2015 9	Al-Faisaly	2–2	Al Hilal	Al-Majma'ah
20:10 (UTC+03:00)	Al-Amer 44'; Bani Attiah 90+2'	Report	27' S. Al-Dawsari; 79' Al-Salem	Stadium: King Salman Sport City Stadium; Attendance: 1,444; Referee: Mohammed Al-Nuhait

6 February 2015 14	Al Hilal	2–1	Al-Shoalah	Riyadh
20:30 (UTC+03:00)	S. Al-Dawsari 13'; Neves 86'	Report	30' Al-Enezi	Stadium: Prince Faisal bin Fahd Stadium; Attendance: 6,090; Referee: Khaled Salwi

17 February 2015 15	Al-Orobah	1–0	Al Hilal	Sakakah
16:05 (UTC+03:00)	Neda 69' (pen.)	Report		Stadium: Al-Orobah Club Stadium; Attendance: 6,735; Referee: Fahad Al-Mirdasi

21 February 2015 16	Al-Ahli	1–1	Al Hilal	Jeddah
20:40 (UTC+03:00)	Al-Jassim 77'	Report	20' Neves	Stadium: King Abdullah Sports City; Attendance: 45,700; Referee: (Hungary) Adam Farkas

28 February 2015 17	Najran	0–2	Al Hilal	Najran
16:05 (UTC+03:00)		Report	36' Al-Shamrani; 61' Darwish	Stadium: Al-Akhdoud Club Stadium; Attendance: 2,468; Referee: Fahad Al-Oraini

7 March 2015 18	Al-Khaleej	0–1	Al Hilal	Khobar
18:25 (UTC+03:00)		Report	90+4' Neves	Stadium: Prince Saud bin Jalawi Stadium; Attendance: 8,315; Referee: Turki Al-Khudair

13 March 2015 19	Al Hilal	3–0	Al-Fateh	Riyadh
20:30 (UTC+03:00)	Neves 25'; Al-Shamrani 50', 54'	Report		Stadium: Prince Faisal bin Fahd Stadium; Attendance: 7,782; Referee: Marai Al-Awaji

22 March 2015 20	Al-Shabab	0–1	Al Hilal	Riyadh
18:45 (UTC+03:00)		Report	16' Al-Shamrani	Stadium: Prince Faisal bin Fahd Stadium; Attendance: 7,867; Referee: Fahad Al-Mirdasi

4 April 2015 21	Al-Taawon	0–1	Al Hilal	Buraidah
21:00 (UTC+03:00)		Report	59' Al-Shamrani	Stadium: King Abdullah Sport City Stadium; Attendance: 6,752; Referee: (Czech Republic) Libor Kovařík

11 April 2015 22	Al Hilal	3–0	Al-Faisaly	Riyadh
21:00 (UTC+03:00)	Digão 30'; Al-Shahrani 59'; Kariri 66'	Report		Stadium: Prince Faisal bin Fahd Stadium; Attendance: 4,616; Referee: Abdulrahman Al-Amri

17 April 2015 23	Al Hilal	3–0	Al-Ittihad	Riyadh
21:10 (UTC+03:00)	Neves 33', 58'; Al-Shamrani 70' (pen.)	Report		Stadium: King Fahad International Stadium; Attendance: 40,730; Referee: (Italy) Marco Guida

26 April 2015 24	Al-Raed	1–1	Al Hilal	Buraidah
21:00 (UTC+03:00)	Yaseen 73'	Report	7' (o.g.) Al-Bishi	Stadium: King Abdullah Sport City Stadium; Attendance: 10,120; Referee: Shukri Al-Hanfosh

10 May 2015 25	Al Hilal	0–1	Al-Nassr	Riyadh
21:00 (UTC+03:00)		Report	20' Al-Sahlawi	Stadium: King Fahad International Stadium; Attendance: 23,193; Referee: (Scotland) John Beaton

15 May 2015 26	Al Hilal	5–1	Hajer	Riyadh
21:00 (UTC+03:00)	Al-Shalhoub 45+5'; Al-Radhi 48' (o.g.); Ka'abi 64'; Al-Salem 74'; Al-Shamrani 82'	Report	59' Al-Shaqran	Stadium: Prince Faisal bin Fahd Stadium; Attendance: 2,677; Referee: Faisal Alblwi

=== Crown Prince Cup ===
Al-Hilal started the Crown Prince Cup directly in the round of 16, as one of last year's finalists.

23 December 2014 Round of 16	Al-Ittihad	2–3 (a.e.t.)	Al Hilal	Jeddah
20:20 (UTC+03:00)	Marquinho 8' (pen.); Asiri 42'	Report	17' Al-Faraj; 34', 97' Al-Shamrani	Stadium: King Abdullah Sports City; Referee: Fahad Al-Mirdasi

2 February 2015 Quarter-finals	Al Hilal	3–0	Hetten	Riyadh
20:15 (UTC+03:00)	Neves 14' (pen.); Al-Faraj 63'; Ali Duba 90' (o.g.)	Report		Stadium: Prince Faisal bin Fahd Stadium; Referee: Khaled Al-Sinany

9 February 2015 Semi-finals	Al Hilal	3–0	Al-Khaleej	Riyadh
18:25 (UTC+03:00)	Neves 11', 45' (pen.); Al-Shamrani 40'	Report		Stadium: King Fahd International Stadium; Referee: Marai Al-Awaji

13 February 2015 Final	Al Hilal	1–2	Al-Ahli	Riyadh
20:30 (UTC+03:00)	Samaras 76'	Report	59' Al-Soma; 68' M. Hawsawi	Stadium: King Fahd International Stadium; Referee: Turki Al-Khudhayr

=== King Cup ===
10 March 2015 Round of 32	Al Hilal	4–1	Al-Jeel	Riyadh
20:40 (UTC+03:00)	Neves 45+3', 61'; Digão 55'; Samaras 64'		45+2' Abdulrahim Al-Dabbas	Stadium: King Fahd International Stadium

14 April 2015 Round of 16	Al Hilal	6–1	Hajer	Riyadh
20:30 (UTC+03:00)	Neves 10', 55'; Al-Shamrani 19' (pen.); Al-Faraj 21'; S. Al-Dawsari 58'; Al-Abed 67'	Report	3' Al-Arfej	Stadium: King Fahd International Stadium; Referee: Turki Al-Khudair

1 May 2015 Quarter-finals	Al-Faisaly	1–3	Al Hilal	Al-Majma'ah
21:00 (UTC+03:00)	Nu'man 85' (pen.)	Report	11', 29', 69' Al-Shamrani	Stadium: King Salman Sport City Stadium; Referee: Saleh Al-Hathlool

31 May 2015 Semi-finals	Al Hilal	4–1	Al-Ittihad	Riyadh
20:50 (UTC+03:00)	Digão 26', 76'; Neves 72' (pen.); Kwak 83'	Report	36' (pen.) Al-Muwallad	Stadium: King Fahd International Stadium; Referee: Saleh Al-Hathlool

5 June 2015 Final	Al Hilal	1–1 (a.e.t.) (7–6 p)	Al-Nassr	Jeddah
21:00 (UTC+03:00)	Jahfali 120+1'	Report	92' Al Sahlawi	Stadium: King Abdullah Sports City; Referee: Paolo Mazzoleni, (Italy)
	Penalties
	Al-Shalhoub (penalty scored); Kwak (penalty scored); Al-Salem (penalty scored); Al Abed (penalty scored); Neves (penalty scored); Kariri (penalty scored); Al-Faraj (penalty scored)		(penalty scored) Adrian; (penalty scored) Al Sahlawi; (penalty scored) Hussein Sulaimani; (penalty scored) Al-Shehri; (penalty scored) Husain; (penalty scored) Eid; (penalty missed) Sharahili

=== 2014 AFC Champions League ===
==== Knockout stage ====
===== Quarter-finals =====
19 August 2014 First leg	Al Hilal (Saudi Arabia)	1–0	(Qatar) Al-Sadd	Riyadh, Saudi Arabia
20:55 (UTC+03:00)	Al-Faraj 71'	Report		Stadium: King Fahd International Stadium; Attendance: 63,500; Referee: Valentin Kovalenko (Uzbekistan)

26 August 2014 Second leg	Al-Sadd (Qatar)	0–0 (0–1 agg.)	(Saudi Arabia) Al Hilal	Doha, Qatar
19:00 (UTC+03:00)		Report		Stadium: Jassim Bin Hamad Stadium; Attendance: 14,200; Referee: Kim Jong-hyeok (South Korea)

===== Semi-finals =====
16 September 2014 First leg	Al Hilal (Saudi Arabia)	3–0	(United Arab Emirates) Al-Ain	Riyadh, Saudi Arabia
20:30 (UTC+03:00)	Al-Shamrani 61', 64'; Neves 70'	Report		Stadium: King Fahd International Stadium; Attendance: 57,170; Referee: Masaaki Toma (Japan)

30 September 2014 Second leg	Al-Ain (United Arab Emirates)	2–1 (2–4 agg.)	(Saudi Arabia) Al Hilal	Al Ain, United Arab Emirates
18:15 (UTC+03:00)	Lee 10'; Kembo 78'	Report	66' Al-Shamrani	Stadium: Hazza Bin Zayed Stadium; Attendance: 24,204; Referee: Ravshan Irmatov (Uzbekistan)

===== Final =====
25 October 2014 First leg	W.S. Wanderers (Australia)	1–0	(Saudi Arabia) Al Hilal	Sydney, Australia
11:30 (UTC+03:00)	Juric 64'	Report		Stadium: Parramatta Stadium; Attendance: 20,053; Referee: Alireza Faghani (Iran)

1 November 2014 Second leg	Al Hilal (Saudi Arabia)	0–0 (0–1 agg.)	(Australia) W.S. Wanderers	Riyadh, Saudi Arabia
20:30 (UTC+03:00)		Report		Stadium: King Fahd International Stadium; Attendance: 63,763; Referee: Yuichi Nishimura (Japan)

=== 2015 AFC Champions League ===
==== Group stage ====
Pos	Team	Pld	W	D	L	GF	GA	GD	Pts	Qualification	HIL	SAD	FOO	LOK
1	(Saudi Arabia) Al-Hilal	6	4	1	1	9	4	+5	13	Advance to knockout stage	—	2–1	2–0	3–1
2	(Qatar) Al-Sadd	6	3	1	2	9	9	0	10	Advance to knockout stage	1–0	—	1–0	6–2
3	(Iran) Foolad	6	1	3	2	2	4	−2	6		0–0	0–0	—	1–0
4	(Uzbekistan) Lokomotiv Tashkent	6	1	1	4	10	13	−3	4		1–2	5–0	1–1	—

Source: AFC
Rules for classification: Group stage tiebreakers

25 February 2015 1	Al Hilal (Saudi Arabia)	3–1	(Uzbekistan) Lokomotiv Tashkent	Riyadh, Saudi Arabia
20:30 (UTC+03:00)	Kariri 11'; Al-Salem 14'; Neves 71'	Report	39' Mirzayev	Stadium: King Fahd International Stadium; Attendance: 17,440; Referee: Kim Jong-hyeok (South Korea)

4 March 2015 2	Al-Sadd (Qatar)	1–0	(Saudi Arabia) Al Hilal	Doha, Qatar
18:45 (UTC+03:00)	Khalfan 29'	Report		Stadium: Jassim Bin Hamad Stadium; Attendance: 6,843; Referee: Ahmed Al-Kaf (Oman)

17 March 2015 3	Foolad (Iran)	0–0	(Saudi Arabia) Al Hilal	Ahwaz, Iran
15:30 (UTC+03:00)		Report		Stadium: Ghadir Stadium; Attendance: 37,452; Referee: Jarred Gillett (Australia)

8 April 2015 4	Al Hilal (Saudi Arabia)	2–0	(Iran) Foolad	Riyadh, Saudi Arabia
20:45 (UTC+03:00)	Al-Shamrani 46'; Al-Shahrani 61'	Report		Stadium: King Fahd International Stadium; Attendance: 20,087; Referee: Masaaki Toma (Japan)

21 April 2015 5	Lokomotiv Tashkent (Uzbekistan)	1–2	(Saudi Arabia) Al Hilal	Tashkent, Uzbekistan
14:00 (UTC+03:00)	Abdukholiqov 90+4'	Report	56' Al-Abed; 72' Al-Zori	Stadium: Lokomotiv Stadium; Attendance: 3,974; Referee: Nagor Amir Noor Mohamed (Malaysia)

5 May 2015 6	Al Hilal (Saudi Arabia)	2–1	(Qatar) Al-Sadd	Riyadh, Saudi Arabia
19:05 (UTC+03:00)	Al-Salem 20'; Kasola 69' (o.g.)	Report	32' (pen.) Al Haidos	Stadium: King Fahd International Stadium; Attendance: 9,394; Referee: Ko Hyung-jin (South Korea)

==== Knockout stage ====
===== Round of 16 =====
19 May 2015 First leg	Persepolis (Iran)	1–0	(Saudi Arabia) Al Hilal	Tehran, Iran
18:00 (UTC+03:00)	Digão 90+2' (o.g.)	Report	(yellow card) 34' (yellow-red card) 89' Al-Faraj	Stadium: Azadi Stadium; Attendance: 100,000; Referee: Nagor Amir Noor Mohamed (Malaysia)

26 May 2015 Second leg	Al Hilal (Saudi Arabia)	3–0 (3–1 agg.)	(Iran) Persepolis	Riyadh, Saudi Arabia
21:05 (UTC+03:00)	Al-Salem 29'; Al-Shalhoub 57' (pen.); A. Al-Dawsari 90+1'	Report	(yellow card) 70' (yellow-red card) 90+3' Taremi	Stadium: King Fahd International Stadium; Attendance: 23,590; Referee: Valentin Kovalenko (Uzbekistan)

== Statistics ==
=== Goalscorers ===
Rank	No.	Pos	Nat	Name	Pro League	King Cup	Crown Prince Cup	2014 ACL	2015 ACL	Total
1	15	FW	(Saudi Arabia)	Nasser Al-Shamrani	13	4	3	3	1	24
2	7	MF	(Brazil)	Thiago Neves	10	5	3	1	1	20
3	13	MF	(Saudi Arabia)	Salman Al-Faraj	2	1	2	1	0	6
4	16	FW	(Saudi Arabia)	Yousef Al-Salem	2	0	0	0	3	5
5	29	MF	(Saudi Arabia)	Salem Al-Dawsari	3	1	0	0	0	4
5	24	MF	(Saudi Arabia)	Nawaf Al-Abed	2	1	0	0	1	4
5	26	DF	(Brazil)	Digão	1	3	0	0	0	4
8	20	FW	(Saudi Arabia)	Yasser Al-Qahtani	3	0	0	0	0	3
9	10	MF	(Saudi Arabia)	Mohammad Al-Shalhoub	1	0	0	0	1	2
9	14	MF	(Saudi Arabia)	Saud Kariri	1	0	0	0	1	2
9	4	DF	(Saudi Arabia)	Abdullah Al-Zori	1	0	0	0	1	2
9	12	DF	(Saudi Arabia)	Yasser Al-Shahrani	1	0	0	0	1	2
9	23	DF	(South Korea)	Kwak Tae-hwi	1	1	0	0	0	2
9	77	FW	(Greece)	Georgios Samaras	0	1	1	0	0	2
15	25	MF	(Saudi Arabia)	Faisel Darwish	1	0	0	0	0	1
15	19	MF	(Saudi Arabia)	Khalid Ka'abi	1	0	0	0	0	1
15	70	DF	(Saudi Arabia)	Mohammed Jahfali	0	1	0	0	0	1
15	11	MF	(Saudi Arabia)	Abdullaziz Al-Dawsari	0	0	0	0	1	1
Total					43	18	9	5	11	86

=== Assists ===
Rank	No.	Pos	Nat	Name	League	Crown Prince Cup	King Cup	2014 CL	2015 CL	Total
1	7	MF	(Brazil)	Thiago Neves	2	2	4	0	1	9
2	13	MF	(Saudi Arabia)	Salman Al-Faraj	3	1	2	0	2	8
2	29	MF	(Saudi Arabia)	Salem Al-Dawsari	4	1	1	2	0	8
3	15	FW	(Saudi Arabia)	Nasser Al-Shamrani	4	0	1	2	0	7
4	25	MF	(Saudi Arabia)	Faisel Darwish	5	0	0	0	0	5
4	4	DF	(Saudi Arabia)	Abdullah Al-Zori	2	0	1	1	1	5
4	10	MF	(Saudi Arabia)	Mohammad Al-Shalhoub	5	0	0	0	0	5
5	8	MF	(Romania)	Mehai Pintili	3	1	0	0	0	4
6	24	MF	(Saudi Arabia)	Nawaf Al-Abed	2	0	0	1	0	3
7	12	DF	(Saudi Arabia)	Yasser Al-Shahrani	1	0	0	0	1	2
7	16	FW	(Saudi Arabia)	Yousef Al-Salem	0	0	2	0	0	2
7	77	FW	(Greece)	Georgios Samaras	2	0	0	0	0	2
8	11	MF	(Saudi Arabia)	Abdulazez Al Dosari	1	0	0	0	0	1
8	14	MF	(Saudi Arabia)	Saud Karriri	0	1	0	0	0	1
Total					34	6	6	8	4	63
