= Abdulkhaleq Barnawi =

Saudi Arabian footballer

Personal information
- Full name: Abdulkhaleq Barnawi
- Date of birth: October 10, 1984 (age 42)
- Place of birth: Mecca, Saudi Arabia
- Height: 1.80 m (5 ft 11 in)
- Position: Midfielder

Senior career*
| Years | Team | Apps | (Gls) |
| 2009–2016 | Al-Wahda | | |
- * Club domestic league appearances and goals

Abdulkhaleq Barnawi [عبد الخالق برناوي in Arabic] (born 10 October 1984) is a Saudi football player. He currently plays for Al-Wahda FC.
