= Ahmed Mefleh =

Software Engineer

Ahmed Mefleh أحمد مفلح
Personal information
- Full name: Ahmed Mefleh Al-Qahtani
- Date of birth: 18 January 1987 (age 39)
- Place of birth: Abha/Saudi Arabia
- Height: 1.79 m (5 ft 10 in)
- Position: Forward

Team information
- Current team: Al-Maseef

Youth career
- –2006: Abha

Senior career*
Years	Team	Apps	(Gls)
2006–2009	Abha	-	(16)
2009–2011	Al-Ahli	-	(0)
2010–2011	→ Al-Fateh (loan)	6	(0)
2011–2012	Najran	25	(4)
2012–2013	Al-Taawoun	20	(4)
2013–2014	Al-Shoula	0	(0)
2014	Al-Hazem	-	(0)
2015	Abha	-	(2)
2015–2016	Al-Najma	-	(3)
2016–2018	Abha	-	(3)
2018–	Al-Maseef	-	(6)
- * Club domestic league appearances and goals as of 30 July 2020

Ahmed Mefleh (Arabic: أحمد مفلح; born 18 January 1987) is a Saudi Arabian footballer who plays for Al-Maseef as a forward.

== Career ==
He formerly played for Abha, Al-Ahli, Al-Fateh, Najran, Al-Taawoun, Al-Shoulla, Al-Hazem, again Abha, Al-Najma, again Abha, and Al-Maseef.
