= Talal Al-Shamali =

Saudi footballer

Personal information
- Full name: Talal Adel Al-Shamali
- Date of birth: March 4, 1990 (age 36)
- Place of birth: Kuwait
- Position: Winger

Team information
- Current team: Ras Tanura
- Number: 90

Youth career
- 2007–2009: Kuwait SC
- 2009–2010: Al-Qadisiyah FC

Senior career*
Years	Team	Apps	(Gls)
2010–2016	Al-Qadisiyah FC		
2016	→ Al-Nahda (loan)		
2016–2018	Al-Raed		
2017	→ Al-Ta'ee (loan)		
2018	Najran SC		
2019–2022	Al-Jubail		
2022–2023	Al-Hedaya		
2023–2024	Al-Nahda		
2024–	Ras Tanura		
- * Club domestic league appearances and goals

Talal Al-Shamali (born 4 March 1990) is a Saudi football player. He currently plays for Ras Tanura as a winger.
