= Victor Simões =

Brazilian footballer

- Simões in 2011

Personal information
- Full name: Victor Simões de Oliveira
- Date of birth: 23 March 1981 (age 45)
- Place of birth: Rio de Janeiro, Brazil
- Height: 1.76 m (5 ft 9 in)
- Position: Striker

Youth career
- 1998–2001: Flamengo

Senior career*
Years	Team	Apps	(Gls)
2001–2002	Flamengo	15	(4)
2002–2003	Tombense	5	(0)
2003–2004	Germinal Beerschot	29	(8)
2004–2006	Club Brugge	42	(5)
2005–2007	→ Club Brugge II	0	(0)
2006	→ Germinal Beerschot (loan)	0	(0)
2007–2007	Figueirense	10	(3)
2007–2008	Chunnam Dragons	24	(3)
2009–2010	Botafogo	32	(8)
2010	→ Al-Ahli (loan)	4	(2)
2010–2014	Al-Ahli	69	(51)
2014–2015	Umm Salal	8	(5)
2015	Goa	0	(0)
- * Club domestic league appearances and goals

Victor Simões, full name Victor Simões de Oliveira (/siːˈmɔɪnz/ see-MOYNZ; Portuguese pronunciation: [ˈvik.toʁ siˈmõj̃ʒ ˈd͡ʒi o.liˈve(j).ɾɐ]; born March 23, 1981, in Rio de Janeiro) is a Brazilian footballer who last played for Umm Salal SC in the Qatar Stars League.

== Career ==
Victor began his career in 2001 at Flamengo, before transferring to Tombense. After two years in Brazil, he was transferred to Germinal Beerschot, a Belgian club.

After just one season, he joined Club Brugge in January 2004. He secured his position in the starting XI in Bruges, participating in 23 league matches and 5 matches in the European Cup. He won the Belgian Supercup 2004 and a year later the title of Belgian champion. But in the summer of 2005, Victor became confined to the bench as he did not receive the confidence of new coach Jan Ceulemans.

By the end of the year, he is relegated to the B team, and then was loaned in January 2006 to his former club Germinal Beerschot. He did not make any appearance until the end of the season, and then returned to Brazil, Figueirense.

Victor played for around a year at his new club, then joined the Chunnam Dragons South Korean club in summer 2007. After his spell at the South Korean club, he returned to Brazil again, joining Botafogo, and winning Taça Guanabara.

He was then loaned in January 2010 to Saudi club Al-Ahli Jeddah, winning 2011 King Cup of Champions in final against Ittihad after drawing 0–0, Victor scored the last penalty-kick in a 4–2 win. After his loan spell, Victor was transferred to Al-Ahli permanently. Victor was the joint top scorer along with Nasser in 2011–12 SPL, helping Al-Ahli finish second. Victor also won the 2012 King Cup of Champions, against Al-Nasr in a final that ended 4–1.

He joined Umm Salal in January 2014 after leaving Al-Ahli. but he was released from his contract at the end of the season.

On 19 June 2015, FC Goa announced that Victor will be part of the first team squad of the Indian club for the 2015 Indian Super League. Victor left Goa at the end of October without playing a game for the club, due to injury.

== Club career statistics ==
=== Club ===
Club performance			League		Cup		Continental		Other		Total	
Season	Club	League	Apps	Goals	Apps	Goals	Apps	Goals	Apps	Goals	Apps	Goals
2001	Flamengo	Série A	15	4	0	0	0	0	0	0	15	4
2002	Tombense	Mineiro 2ª Divisão	5	0	0	0	0	0	0	0	5	0
2003–04	Germinal Beerschot	BPL	29	8	0	0	4	0	0	0	33	8
2004–05	Club Brugge	BPL	23	4	0	0	5	0	0	0	28	4
2005–06	Club Brugge	BPL	19	1	0	0	2	0	0	0	21	1
2005–06	Club Brugge II	Belgian Provincial leagues	0	0	0	0	0	0	0	0	0	0
2005–06	Germinal Beerschot	BPL	0	0	0	0	0	0	0	0	0	0
2007	Figueirense	Série A	10	3	10	5	0	0	0	0	20	8
2008	Chunnam Dragons	K League	24	3	0	0	4	2	0	0	28	5
2009	Botafogo	Série A	32	8	2	0	5	0	16	11	55	19
2009–10	Al-Ahli	SPL	4	2	5	7	6	4	0	0	15	13
2010–11	Al-Ahli	SPL	20	16	6	3	0	0	0	0	26	19
2011–12	Al-Ahli	SPL	26	21	7	1	10	7	0	0	43	29
2012–13	Al-Ahli	SPL	19	12	2	2	4	3	0	0	25	17
2013–14	Al-Ahli	SPL	4	2	0	0	0	0	0	0	4	2
Al-Ahli Total	Al-Ahli	SPL	73	53	20	13	20	14	0	0	113	80
2013–14	Umm Salal	QSL	9	6	0	0	0	0	0	0	9	6
Career total			186	75	15	8	45	16	16	11	255	108

== Honours ==
=== Club ===
==== Winners ====
Club Brugge

- Jupiler League 2004-05
- Belgian Supercup 2004

Botafogo

- Taça Guanabara 2009

Al-Ahli

- King Cup of Champions: 2011, 2012

=== Individual ===
- Al-Ahli Player of the Season: 2010–11
- 2011–12 Saudi Professional League: Top Scorer
- 2010 Saudi Crown Prince Cup: Top Scorer
- 2007 Copa do Brasil: Top Scorer
