= 2007–08 Saudi Premier League =

Saudi Premier League
- Season: 2007–08
- Champions: Al-Hilal
- Relegated: Al-Qadsiah; Al-Tai
- AFC Champions League: Al-Hilal; Al-Ittihad; Al-Shabab; Al-Ettifaq
- Top goalscorer: Nasser Al-Shamrani (18 goals)

The 2007-08 season of the Saudi Premier League was the 32nd season of top-tier football in Saudi Arabia.

== Clubs ==
=== Stadia and locations ===
Team	Location	Venue	Capacity	Head coach
Al-Ahli	Jeddah	Prince Mohammed bin Abdullah Al Faisal Stadium	24,000	(Serbia) Nebojša Vučković
Al-Ettifaq	Dammam	Prince Mohamed bin Fahd Stadium	35,000	(Portugal) Toni
Al-Hazem	Ar Rass	Al-Hazem Club Stadium	3,000	(Tunisia) Ammar Souayah
Al-Hilal	Riyadh	King Fahd Sports City	67,000	(Romania) Cosmin Olăroiu
Al-Ittihad	Jeddah	Prince Abdullah Al-Faisal Sports City	27,000	(Brazil) Estevam Soares
Al-Nassr	Riyadh	King Fahd Sports City / Prince Faisal bin Fahd Sports City	67,000 / 27,000	(Brazil) Ednaldo Patrício
Al-Qadsiah	Khobar	Prince Saud bin Jalawi Sports City	10,000	(Portugal) Carlos Alhinho
Al-Shabab	Riyadh	King Fahd Sports City	67,000	(Argentina) Enzo Trossero
Al-Tai	Ḥaʼil	Prince Abdulaziz bin Musa'ed Sports City	10,000	(Brazil) Fernando Suárez
Al-Watani	Tabuk	Khalid bin Abdul Aziz Stadium		
Al-Wehda	Mecca	King Abdulaziz Sports City	38,000	(Saudi Arabia) Khalid Al-Koroni
Najran	Najran	Najran Stadium	3,000	(Serbia) Ivica Todorov

=== Foreign players ===
Club	Player 1	Player 2	Player 3	Player 4	Former players
Al-Ahli	(Brazil) Caio	(Brazil) Leandro	(Brazil) Val Baiano		(Brazil) Guarú (Brazil) Nunes (Tunisia) Khaled Badra
Al-Ettifaq	(Ghana) Prince Tagoe	(Morocco) Salaheddine Aqqal	(Senegal) Mohamed Rebeiz		(Romania) Radu Neguț
Al-Hazem	(Ghana) Godwin Attram	(Iraq) Zain Al-Abdeen	(Kuwait) Fahad Al-Rashidi	(Oman) Said Suwailim Al-Shoon	(Brazil) Fábio (Brazil) Iranildo
Al-Hilal	(Brazil) Marcelo Tavares	(Democratic Republic of the Congo) Lelo Mbele	(Libya) Tarik El Taib	(Uruguay) Marco Vanzini	(Brazil) Bruno Agnello (Ghana) Baba Adamu
Al-Ittihad	(Brazil) Magno Alves	(Brazil) Tcheco	(Democratic Republic of the Congo) Mbala Mbuta Biscotte	(Guinea) Alhassane Keita	(Brazil) Renan Teixeira (Brazil) Robert
Al-Nassr	(Brazil) Élton Arábia	(Portugal) Hugo Porfírio	(Tunisia) Abdelkarim Nafti	(Tunisia) Issam Merdassi	
Al-Qadsiah	(Algeria) Samir Amirèche	(Brazil) Walter Minhoca	(Libya) Ahmed Zuway	(Senegal) Daouda N'Diaye	(Argentina) Walter Ariel Silva (Morocco) Younes Gassen
Al-Shabab	(Argentina) Juan Manuel Martínez	(Brazil) Fernando	(Brazil) Marcelo Camacho		(Ghana) Godwin Attram (Nigeria) Michael Eneramo
Al-Tai	(Morocco) Faysal El Idrissi	(Morocco) Hassan Bouizgar	(Senegal) Amadi Cissé		
Al-Watani	(Algeria) Yacine Hima	(Burkina Faso) Ousmane Traoré	(France) Sylvain Idangar		
Al-Wehda	(Cameroon) Pierre Njanka	(Egypt) Hassan Mostafa	(Ghana) Abdullah Quaye	(Libya) Omar Daoud	(Tunisia) Marouane Bokri
Najran	(Brazil) Wilsinho	(France) Abdulfatah Safi	(Ivory Coast) Bamba Drissa	(Tunisia) Moez Alaya	

== League standings ==
Pos	Team	Pld	W	D	L	GF	GA	GD	Pts	Promotion or relegation
1	Al-Hilal (C)	22	14	6	2	36	13	+23	48 (Note: Al-Hilal finished top due to their superior head-to-head record against Al-Ittihad.)	Champions and qualified for 2009 AFC Champions League
2	Al-Ittihad	22	14	6	2	40	16	+24	48	Qualified for 2009 AFC Champions League
3	Al-Shabab	22	11	9	2	39	21	+18	42	Qualified for 2009 AFC Champions League
4	Al-Ettifaq	22	10	5	7	34	25	+9	35	Qualified for 2009 AFC Champions League
5	Al-Nassr	22	9	6	7	34	35	−1	33	
6	Al-Wehda	22	8	5	9	29	27	+2	29	
7	Al-Hazem	22	7	6	9	26	28	−2	27	
8	Al-Ahli	22	7	5	10	30	31	−1	26	
9	Al-Watani	22	6	7	9	20	32	−12	25	
10	Najran	22	5	6	11	29	44	−15	21	
11	Al-Tai	22	2	7	13	20	38	−18	13	Relegated
12	Al-Qadsiah	22	2	6	14	17	44	−27	12	Relegated

(C) Champions

== Season statistics ==
=== Top scorers ===
Rank	Scorer	Club	Goals
1	(Saudi Arabia) Nasser Al-Shamrani	Al-Shabab	18
2	(Saudi Arabia) Al-Hasan Al-Yami	Najran	16
3	(Saudi Arabia) Essa Al-Mehyani	Al-Wehda	14
4	(Ghana) Prince Tagoe	Al-Ettifaq	10
4	(Saudi Arabia) Mohammed Al-Shahrani	Al-Nassr	10
4	(Saudi Arabia) Saad Al-Harthi	Al-Nassr	10
4	(Saudi Arabia) Saleh Bashir	Al-Ettifaq	10
4	(Saudi Arabia) Yasser Al-Qahtani	Al-Hilal	10
