= Salman Al-Sibyani =

Saudi Arabian footballer

Personal information
- Full name: Salman Ahmed Al-Sibyani
- Date of birth: 11 November 1989 (age 37)
- Place of birth: Saudi Arabia
- Height: 1.69 m (5 ft 6 1/2 in)
- Position: Striker

Senior career*
Years	Team	Apps	(Gls)
2009–2011	Al-Wehda Club	22	(5)
2012–2017	Ittihad FC	17	(2)
2014–2015	→ Al-Raed (loan)	11	(1)
2018	Najran		

International career
2011	Saudi Arabia U23	1	(0)
- * Club domestic league appearances and goals as of 5 May 2017

Salman Al-Sibyani (born 11 November 1989) is a Saudi Arabian footballer who plays as a striker.
