= Ahmed Al-Fraidi =

Saudi Arabian footballer

Personal information
- Full name: Ahmed Mohammed Al-Fraidi
- Date of birth: January 29, 1988 (age 38)
- Place of birth: Medina, Saudi Arabia
- Height: 1.72 m (5 ft 8 in)
- Position: Midfielder

Youth career
- 2001–2004: Al-Ansar
- 2004–2007: Al-Hilal

Senior career*
Years	Team	Apps	(Gls)
2007–2012	Al-Hilal	88	(10)
2012–2014	Ittihad	17	(1)
2014–2019	Al-Nassr	60	(7)
2020	Melilla	0	(0)
2020–2021	Al-Qadsiah	1	(0)
2021–2022	Costa Brava	0	(0)

International career^{‡}
2008–2018	Saudi Arabia	37	(6)
- * Club domestic league appearances and goals as of 17:55, 15 March 2018 (UTC) ‡ National team caps and goals as of 28 February 2018

Ahmed Al-Fraidi (Arabic: أحمد الفريدي; born 29 January 1988 in Medina) is a Saudi football plays for Costa Brava as a midfielder.

== Career ==
At the age of 17, he joined the Riyadh based club Al-Hilal, where he played as number 8 on a midfielder position.

== Career statistics ==
As of match played on 17 May 2019.

Appearances and goals by club, season and competition
Club	Season	League			Cup		League Cup		Continental		Other		Total	
Club	Season	Division	Apps	Goals	Apps	Goals	Apps	Goals	Apps	Goals	Apps	Goals	Apps	Goals
Al-Hilal	2007–08	Pro League	6	0	4	0	2	0	—		—		12	0
Al-Hilal	2008–09	Pro League	19	4	1	0	3	0	3	0	—		26	4
Al-Hilal	2009–10	Pro League	13	1	3	0	2	0	7	1	—		25	2
Al-Hilal	2010–11	Pro League	23	2	4	1	4	2	7	1	—		38	6
Al-Hilal	2011–12	Pro League	22	2	4	1	2	0	5	1	—		33	4
Al-Hilal	2012–13	Pro League	5	1	0	0	0	0	0	0	—		5	1
Al-Hilal	Total		88	10	16	2	13	2	22	3	0	0	139	17
Al-Ittihad	2012–13	Pro League	7	0	3	1	0	0	—		—		10	1
Al-Ittihad	2013–14	Pro League	10	1	4	2	0	0	4	0	1 (Note: Appearance in Saudi Super Cup)	0	19	3
Al-Ittihad	Total		17	1	7	3	0	0	4	0	1	0	29	4
Al-Nassr	2014–15	Pro League	15	5	1	0	2	0	4	0	—		22	5
Al-Nassr	2015–16	Pro League	10	1	4	2	0	0	3	0	—		17	3
Al-Nassr	2016–17	Pro League	15	1	2	0	4	0	—		—		21	1
Al-Nassr	2017–18	Pro League	15	0	3	0	—		—		3 (Note: Appearances in Arab Club Champions Cup)	0	21	0
Al-Nassr	2018–19	Pro League	5	0	2	0	—		0	0	4	0	11	0
Al-Nassr	Total		60	7	12	2	6	0	7	0	7	0	92	9
Career totals			165	18	35	7	20	2	33	3	8	0	260	30

- Assists

Season	Team	Assists
2008–09	Al-Hilal	6
2009–10	Al-Hilal	0
2010–11	Al-Hilal	5
2011–12	Al-Hilal	5
2012–13	Al-Hilal	2
2012–13	Al-Ittihad	0
2013–14	Al-Ittihad	0
2014–15	Al-Nassr	3
2015–16	Al-Nassr	2
2016–17	Al-Nassr	3
2017–18	Al-Nassr	1

== International career ==
He is the youngest player to join the Saudi national team and was chosen to play at the World Cup Qualification in 2010.

=== International goals ===
Scores and results list Saudi Arabia's goal tally first.

#	Date	Venue	Opponent	Score	Result	Competition
1	14 June 2008	National Stadium, Singapore	Singapore	2–0	2–0	2010 FIFA World Cup qualification
2	10 September 2008	Mohammed Bin Zayed Stadium, Abu Dhabi	United Arab Emirates	2–1	2–1	2010 FIFA World Cup qualification
3	11 January 2009	Sultan Qaboos Sports Complex, Muscat	United Arab Emirates	3–0	3–0	19th Arabian Gulf Cup
4	14 January 2009	Sultan Qaboos Sports Complex, Muscat	Kuwait	1–0	1–0	19th Arabian Gulf Cup
5	21 May 2010	Ernst Happel Stadion, Vienna	DR Congo	1–0	2–0	Friendly
6	11 November 2011	King Fahd International Stadium, Riyadh	Thailand	2–0	3–0	2014 FIFA World Cup qualification

== Honours ==
=== Club ===
Al-Hilal

- Saudi Premier League : 2007–08, 2009–10, 2010–11
- Crown Prince Cup : 2007–08, 2008–09, 2009–10, 2010–11, 2011–12

Al-Nassr

- Saudi Premier League : 2014–15
