= Essa Al-Mehyani =

Saudi Arabian footballer

Essa Al Mehyani
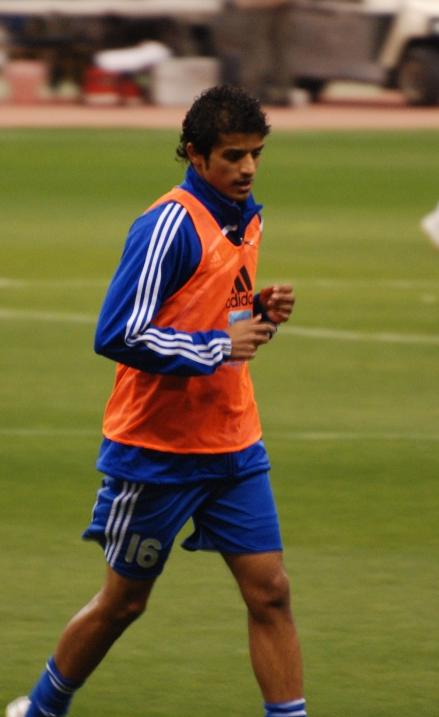

Personal information
- Full name: Essa Mohhmad Humod Al Mehyani Al Hothaili
- Date of birth: 22 June 1983 (age 43)
- Place of birth: Mecca, Saudi Arabia
- Height: 1.76 m (5 ft 9 in)
- Position: Striker

Youth career
- 2000–2003: Al-Wehda

Senior career*
Years	Team	Apps	(Gls)
2003–2009	Al-Wehda	99	(72)
2009–2012	Al-Hilal	55	(21)
2012–2013	Al-Ahli	16	(3)
2013–2015	Al-Shabab	23	(3)
2015	Al-Ittihad	2	(0)
2015–2016	Najran	17	(3)

International career
2001–2003	Saudi Arabia U-20	9	(7)
2003–2012	Saudi Arabia	14	(3)

Managerial career
- 2018–2020: Al-Wehda (assistant)
- 2020: Al-Wehda (caretaker)
- 2020–: Al-Wehda (assistant)
- * Club domestic league appearances and goals

Essa Mohhmad Humod Al Mehyani Al Hothaili (Arabic: عيسى محمد حمود المحياني الهذلي; born June 6, 1983) is a retired Saudi Arabian football player who played as a striker. He spent most of his career at Al-Wehda. He is a former Saudi international making 14 appearances for the national team. He is currently the assistant manager of Al-Wehda.

== Club career statistics ==
Club	Season	League		Cup		ACL		Total	
Club	Season	Apps	Goals	Apps	Goals	Apps	Goals	Apps	Goals
Al-Wahda	2003-04	6	4	0	0	-	-	6	4
Al-Wahda	2004-05	2	0	3	2	-	-	5	2
Al-Wahda	2005-06	19	16	8	5	-	-	27	21
Al-Wahda	2006-07	14	9	5	3	-	-	19	12
Al-Wahda	2007-08	19	14	4	1	2	2	25	17
Al-Wahda	2008-09	16	7	3	1	2	8	17	16
Total		72	50	23	12	4	10	99	72
Al-Hilal	2009-10	7	3	4	2	5	3	16	8
Al-Hilal	2010-11	16	5	4	2	1	0	20	7
Al-Hilal	2011-12	15	5	3	1	0	0	18	6
Total		38	13	8	4	6	3	55	21
Al-Ahli	2012-13	1	2	0	0	0	0	1	2
Career Total		111	65	31	16	10	13	155	90

== Honours ==
=== Club ===
With Al-Hilal

- Saudi Professional League: 2010, 2011.
- Crown Prince Cup: 2009, 2010, 2011, 2012.

=== National team career statistics ===
==== U-20 ====
- 2002 AFC Youth Championship: Third Place
- 2003 FIFA World Youth Championship: Group Stage

=== Individual ===
- 2002 AFC Youth Championship: Top Scores
- 2005–06 Saudi Premier League: Top Scores
- 2007–08 Arab Champions League: Top Scores
