= 2015–16 Al-Hilal FC season =

Al-Hilal
2015–16 season
- President: Nawaf Bin Sa'ad
- Manager: Georgios Donis (until 18 May 2016); Abdullatif Al-Hussaini (caretaker) (until end of the season)
- Stadium: King Fahd Stadium; Faisal bin Fahd Stadium
- SPL: 2nd
- Super Cup: Winners
- Crown Prince Cup: Winners
- King Cup: Semi-finals
- AFC Champions League: 2015: Semi-finals; 2016: Round of 16
- Top goalscorer: League: Carlos Eduardo (14); All: Carlos Eduardo (24)
- Highest home attendance: 53,263 vs Al-Ahli (29 September 2015, Champions League)
- Lowest home attendance: 1,190 vs Lekhwiya (25 August 2015, Champions League)
- Average home league attendance: 11,872
Home colours	Away colours

The 2015–16 season was the Al-Hilal Saudi Football Club's 59th in existence and 40th consecutive season in the top flight of Saudi Arabian football. Along with Pro League, the club also competed in the AFC Champions League, Super Cup, Crown Prince Cup and the King Cup.

== Players ==
=== Squad information ===
Players and squad numbers last updated on 23 February 2016.
Note: Flags indicate national team as has been defined under FIFA eligibility rules. Players may hold more than one non-FIFA nationality.

No.	Name	Nat.	Position(s)	Date of birth (age)	Signed in	Contract until	Signed from	Transfer Fee	Notes
Goalkeepers
1	Khalid Sharahili	(Saudi Arabia)	GK	3 February 1987 (aged 29)	2007	2019	Youth system	N/A	
22	Fahad Al-Thunayan	(Saudi Arabia)	GK	29 August 1986 (aged 29)	2014	2016	(Saudi Arabia) Al-Taawon	€1.8M	
28	Abdullah Al-Sudairy	(Saudi Arabia)	GK	2 February 1992 (aged 24)	2010	2018	Youth system	N/A	
30	Mohammed Al-Waked	(Saudi Arabia)	GK	25 March 1992 (aged 24)	2013	2017	Youth system	N/A	
33	Marwan Al-Haidari	(Saudi Arabia)	GK	12 April 1996 (aged 20)	2016	2020	(Saudi Arabia) Al-Nahda	€0.3M	
Defenders
2	Mohammed Al-Breik	(Saudi Arabia)	RB / RW	15 September 1992 (aged 23)	2014	2016	Youth system	N/A	
4	Abdullah Al-Zori	(Saudi Arabia)	CB / LB	13 August 1987 (aged 28)	2007	2019	(Saudi Arabia) Al-Nahda	?	
5	Ahmed Sharahili	(Saudi Arabia)	CB / RB	8 May 1994 (aged 22)	2013	2018	Youth system	N/A	
12	Yasser Al-Shahrani	(Saudi Arabia)	LB / RB	22 May 1992 (aged 24)	2012	2018	(Saudi Arabia) Al-Qadisiyah	€3.5M	
23	Kwak Tae-Hwi	(South Korea)	CB	8 July 1981 (aged 34)	2014	2016	(Saudi Arabia) Al-Shabab	€0.4M	
26	Digão	(Brazil)	CB	7 May 1988 (aged 28)	2014	2017	(Brazil) Fluminense	€1.5M	
36	Muteb Al-Mufarrij	(Saudi Arabia)	Defender	19 August 1996 (aged 19)	2016		Youth system	N/A	
51	Fahad Ghazi	(Saudi Arabia)	Defender	1 March 1994 (aged 22)	2014	2017	Youth system	N/A	
70	Mohammed Jahfali	(Saudi Arabia)	CB	24 October 1990 (aged 25)	2015	2020	(Saudi Arabia) Al-Faisaly	€1.8M	
Midfielders
3	Carlos Eduardo	(Brazil)	CM / AM	17 October 1989 (aged 26)	2015	2018	(Portugal) FC Porto	€7M	
6	Mohammed Al-Qarni	(Saudi Arabia)	DM / CM	24 November 1989 (aged 26)	2010	2018	Youth system	N/A	
7	Salman Al-Faraj	(Saudi Arabia)	AM / LM / LW	1 August 1989 (aged 26)	2008	2017	Youth system	N/A	Captain
8	Abdullah Otayf	(Saudi Arabia)	DM / CM	3 August 1992 (aged 23)	2013	2018	(Saudi Arabia) Al-Shabab	€2.3M	
10	Mohammad Al-Shalhoub	(Saudi Arabia)	AM / LW	8 December 1980 (aged 35)	1998	2017	Youth system	N/A	
11	Abdullaziz Al-Dawsari	(Saudi Arabia)	AM / LM	11 October 1988 (aged 27)	2007	2019	Youth system	N/A	
14	Saud Kariri	(Saudi Arabia)	DM	8 June 1980 (aged 36)	2014	2016	(Saudi Arabia) Al-Ittihad	Free	Second vice-captain
18	Abdulmajeed Al-Sawat	(Saudi Arabia)	CM / AM	21 April 1995 (aged 21)	2013	2020	Youth system	N/A	
19	Khalid Ka'abi	(Saudi Arabia)	AM / RM / RW	24 May 1992 (aged 24)	2014	2016	Youth system	N/A	
24	Nawaf Al-Abed	(Saudi Arabia)	LW / RW	26 January 1990 (aged 26)	2008	2018	Youth system	N/A	
25	Faisel Darwish	(Saudi Arabia)	DM / CM / RM	3 July 1991 (aged 24)	2015	2020	(Saudi Arabia) Al-Raed	€1.4M	
27	Abdulkareem Al-Qahtani	(Saudi Arabia)	AM	9 February 1993 (aged 23)	2014	2018	Youth system	N/A	
29	Salem Al-Dawsari	(Saudi Arabia)	RM / RW	19 August 1991 (aged 24)	2011	2019	Youth system	N/A	Vice-captain
37	Abdulaziz Al-Sharid	(Saudi Arabia)	DM	5 January 1994 (aged 22)	2014	2017	Youth system	N/A	
Forwards
9	Aílton Almeida	(Brazil)	ST / CF	20 August 1984 (aged 31)	2015	2016	(Russia) FC Terek Grozny	Free	
15	Nasser Al-Shamrani	(Saudi Arabia)	ST / CF	23 November 1983 (aged 32)	2013	2016	(Saudi Arabia) Al-Shabab	€4.2M	
16	Yousef Al-Salem	(Saudi Arabia)	ST / CF	4 May 1985 (aged 31)	2013	2017	(Saudi Arabia) Al-Ettifaq	Free	
20	Yasser Al-Qahtani	(Saudi Arabia)	ST / CF	11 October 1982 (aged 33)	2005	2017	(Saudi Arabia) Al-Qadisiyah	€5.3M	

== Transfers ==
=== In ===
Date	Pos.	Player	Age	Moving from	Fee	Notes	Source
9 April 2015	FW	(Saudi Arabia) Younes Alaiwi	25	(Saudi Arabia) Al-Shoalah			
1 July 2015	DF	(Saudi Arabia) Mohammed Al-Breik	22	(Saudi Arabia) Al-Raed		Return from loan	
4 July 2015	MF	(Brazil) Carlos Eduardo	25	(Portugal) FC Porto	€7M+3M variables		
4 July 2015	FW	(Brazil) Aílton Almeida	30	(Russia) FC Terek Grozny	Free		
12 November 2015	GK	(Saudi Arabia) Marwan Al-Haidari	19	(Saudi Arabia) Al-Nahda	€0.3M		

=== Out ===
Date	Pos.	Player	Age	Moving to	Fee	Notes	Source
8 June 2015	MF	(Brazil) Thiago Neves	30	(United Arab Emirates) Al Jazira	€11M		
1 July 2015	GK	(Saudi Arabia) Fayz Al-Sabiay	32	(Saudi Arabia) Al-Taawon	Free		
1 July 2015	FW	(Greece) Georgios Samaras	30	(England) West Bromwich		Loan Return	

=== On loan ===
Date	Pos.	Player	Age	Loaned to	Loan Fee	Notes	Loan Expiry	Source
12 July 2015	MF	(Saudi Arabia) Abdulellah Al-Fadhl	22	(Saudi Arabia) Najran			30 June 2016	
20 July 2015	DF	(Saudi Arabia) Sultan Al-Deayea	22	(Saudi Arabia) Al-Shabab	€0.2M	with an option to buy.	30 June 2016	
18 August 2015	DF	(Saudi Arabia) Sultan Al-Bishi	25	(Saudi Arabia) Al-Raed			30 June 2016	
21 August 2015	MF	(Saudi Arabia) Hamed Al-Hamed	27	(Saudi Arabia) Al-Raed				
18 December 2015	FW	(Saudi Arabia) Younes Alaiwi	25	(Saudi Arabia) Al-Raed			30 June 2016	
18 December 2015	DF	(Saudi Arabia) Abdullah Al-Shamekh	22	(Saudi Arabia) Al-Raed			30 June 2016	
20 December 2015	DF	(Saudi Arabia) Abdullah Al-Hafith	22	(Saudi Arabia) Hajer			30 June 2016	

== Pre-season and friendlies ==
27 July 2015 Friendly	Al-Hilal (Saudi Arabia)	0–1	(Turkey) Gaziantepspor	Salzburg, Austria
18:35 (UTC+02:00)			28' Chibuike

30 July 2015 Friendly	Al-Hilal (Saudi Arabia)	2–0	(Turkey) Akhisar Belediyespor	Salzburg, Austria
18:00 (UTC+02:00)	Aílton 29'; A. Al-Dawsari 74'

2 August 2015 Friendly	Al-Hilal (Saudi Arabia)	2–1	(United Arab Emirates) Al-Ain	Salzburg, Austria
18:00 (UTC+02:00)	Al-Shalhoub 13'; Al-Shamekh (red card) 29'; Ka'abi 74'		10' Bastos

5 August 2015 Friendly	Udinese (Italy)	1–0	(Saudi Arabia) Al-Hilal	Udine, Italy
18:00 (UTC+02:00)	Di Natale 2'			Stadium: Stadio Friuli

4 September 2015 Friendly	Al-Hilal (Saudi Arabia)	2–1	(Saudi Arabia) Al-Khaleej	Riyadh, Saudi Arabia
18:45 (UTC+03:00)	A. Al-Dawsari 41', 68'		76' Al-Turki	Stadium: Club Stadium

6 October 2015 Friendly	Al-Hilal (Saudi Arabia)	1–0	(Saudi Arabia) Al-Faisaly	Riyadh, Saudi Arabia
18:20 (UTC+03:00)	Ka'abi 52'			Stadium: Club Stadium

14 January 2016 Friendly	Al-Hilal (Saudi Arabia)	1–2	(Saudi Arabia) Al-Faisaly	Riyadh, Saudi Arabia
18:00 (UTC+03:00)	Al-Shamrani 34'		16'; 90+2'	Stadium: Club Stadium

15 January 2016 Friendly	Al-Hilal (Saudi Arabia)	3–1	(Finland) SJK Seinäjoki	Riyadh, Saudi Arabia
17:50 (UTC+03:00)	Al-Shahrani 33'; Eduardo 59'; Al-Salem 85'		45' Roope Riski	Stadium: Prince Faisal bin Fahd Stadium

== Competitions ==
=== Overall ===
Competition	Started round	Final position / round	First match	Last match
Saudi Super Cup	Final	Winners	12 August 2015	
Professional League	Round 1	Runners-up	19 August 2015	12 May 2016
2015 Champions League	Quarter-finals	Semi-finals	25 August 2015	20 October 2015
Crown Prince Cup	Round of 16	Winners	30 November 2015	19 February 2016
2016 Champions League	Group stage	Round of 16	24 February 2016	24 May 2016
King Cup	Round of 32	Semi-finals	21 January 2016	29 April 2016

Last Updated: 24 May 2016

=== Saudi Super Cup ===
12 August 2015	Al-Nassr	0–1	Al-Hilal	London, England
18:00 CEST		Report	63' C. Eduardo	Stadium: Loftus Road Stadium; Attendance: 8,439; Referee: Craig Pawson, (England)

=== Pro League ===
==== League table ====
Pos	Team	Pld	W	D	L	GF	GA	GD	Pts	Qualification or relegation
1	Al-Ahli (C)	26	19	6	1	55	21	+34	63	Qualification for the AFC Champions League group stage (Note: Since the winners of the 2016 King Cup, Al-Ahli, qualified for AFC Champions League group stage based on their league position, the spot awarded to the cup winner (2017 AFC Champions League group stage) was passed to the third-placed team and the spot for the third-placed team (AFC Champions League play-off round) was passed to the fourth-placed team.)
2	Al-Hilal	26	17	4	5	52	23	+29	55	Qualification for the AFC Champions League group stage and Arab Club Championship group stage
3	Al-Ittihad (Note: Al-Ittihad did not obtain an AFC license. Therefore, even if they earn the right to play in Asian competitions based on league position, they will not be able to participate.)	26	15	4	7	54	37	+17	49	
4	Al-Taawoun	26	13	6	7	54	35	+19	45	Qualification for the AFC Champions League group stage
5	Al-Fateh	26	11	8	7	35	28	+7	41	Qualification for the AFC Champions League play-off round

Source: SLstat.com
Rules for classification: 1) Points; 2) Head-to-head points; 3) Head-to-head goal difference; 4) Total goal difference; 5) Total goals scored; 6) Play-off (only for deciding champion, relegation and AFC competitions participation).
(C) Champions

==== Results summary ====
Overall								Home						Away					
Pld	W	D	L	GF	GA	GD	Pts	W	D	L	GF	GA	GD	W	D	L	GF	GA	GD
26	17	4	5	52	23	+29	55	8	3	2	27	9	+18	9	1	3	25	14	+11

Last updated: 12 May 2016.
Source: Competitive matches

==== Results by round ====
Round	1	2	3	4	5	6	7	8	9	10	11	12	13	14	15	16	17	18	19	20	21	22	23	24	25	26
Ground	H	A	H	H	A	H	H	A	H	H	A	A	A	A	H	A	A	H	A	H	A	H	A	A	H	H
Result	W	W	W	W	L	W	W	W	W	L	W	W	W	W	D	W	L	L	D	W	W	D	W	L	W	D
Position	3	2	1	1	3	1	1	1	1	2	2	2	2	1	1	1	1	1	2	2	2	2	2	2	2	2

Updated to match(es) played on 12 May 2016. Source: Competitive matches
A = Away; H = Home; W = Win; D = Draw; L = Loss

==== Matches ====
All times are local, AST (UTC+3).

Win Draw Loss Postponed

19 August 2015 1	Al-Hilal	2–0	Al-Wehda	Riyadh
20:45	Kaabi 8'; Aílton 26'	Report	(yellow card) 60' Al-Mansor; (yellow card) 72' Barnawi	Stadium: King Fahd International Stadium; Attendance: 16,883; Referee: Mohammed Al-Qarni

29 August 2015 2	Al-Fateh	1–2	Al-Hilal	Al-Hasa
18:45	Élton 42'	Report	29' Aílton; 80' C. Eduardo; (yellow card) 90+2' Digão	Stadium: Prince Abdullah bin Jalawi Stadium; Attendance: 11,688; Referee: Marai Al-Awaji

20 September 2015 3	Al-Hilal	1–0	Al-Raed	Riyadh
18:35	Al-Abed (yellow card) 35'; Darwish (yellow card) 38'; C. Eduardo 45+3'	Report		Stadium: King Fahd International Stadium; Attendance: 17,574; Referee: Shukri Al-Hanfosh

25 October 2015 4	Al-Hilal	3–1	Al-Taawoun	Riyadh
20:00	C. Eduardo 9', 90', (yellow card) 90+4'; Al-Breik 79'	Report	64' Mousa; (yellow card) 90+4' Muaad; (yellow card) 90+4' Majrashi	Stadium: Prince Faisal bin Fahd Stadium; Attendance: 10,230; Referee: Mohammed Al-Hoaish

30 October 2015 5	Al-Ittihad	4–3	Al-Hilal	Jeddah
20:30	Sharahili 2' (o.g.); Rivas 26', (yellow card) 48'; Al-Muwallad 32'; Troisi (yellow card) 42'; Abousaban 73'; Noor (yellow card) 88'; Montashari (yellow card) 90+3'	Report	(yellow card) 37' Ka'abi; 50' C. Eduardo; (yellow card) 65', (goal) 84' Aílton; 66', (yellow card) 81' Al-Shahrani	Stadium: King Abdullah Sports City; Attendance: 59,037; Referee: Pavel Královec (Czech Republic)

3 November 2015 6	Al-Hilal	1–0	Al-Qadisiyah	Riyadh
17:55	Al-Shamrani 83', (yellow card) 84'	Report	(yellow card) 31' Cley; (yellow card) 45+2' Al-Najrani; (yellow card) 76' Khabrani; (yellow card) 90+2' Mellouli	Stadium: Prince Faisal bin Fahd Stadium; Attendance: 8,585; Referee: Faisal Al-Blwi

21 November 2015 8	Al-Hilal	7–0	Al-Khaleej	Riyadh
17:45	Al-Shamrani 39', 76'; Al-Zori 52'; Kariri 65'; Al-Abed 67'; Al-Breik 79'; Al-Qahtani 85' (pen.)	Report	(yellow card) 10' Rishani; (yellow card) 67' Alawjami; (yellow card) 84' Al-Jadaani	Stadium: Prince Faisal bin Fahd Stadium; Attendance: 5,097; Referee: Turki Al-Khudair

27 November 2015 9	Al-Shabab	0–1	Al-Hilal	Riyadh
20:00	Al-Khaibri (yellow card) 13'; Rafinha (yellow card) 72'; Al-Shammari (yellow card) 77'; Muath (yellow card) 89'	Report	(yellow card) 43' Kariri; 45+1' Eduardo; (yellow card) 58' Al-Faraj	Stadium: Prince Faisal bin Fahd Stadium; Attendance: 14,850; Referee: Mohammed Al-Hoaish

4 December 2015 10	Al-Hilal	2–0	Najran	Riyadh
20:00	Eduardo 16', 23'; Al-Qahtani (yellow card) 90+2'	Report	(yellow card) 18' Khodari; (yellow card) 39' Al-Mousa; (yellow card) 62' Al-Khaibari	Stadium: Prince Faisal bin Fahd Stadium; Attendance: 9,079; Referee: Abdulrahman Al-Shehri

10 December 2015 11	Al-Hilal	1–2	Al-Ahli	Riyadh
20:15	Al-Shahrani (yellow card) 44'; Eduardo 47'; Al-Dawsari (yellow card) 58'	Report	24' Al-Mogahwi; (yellow card) 30' Al-Moasher; (yellow card) 56' Al-Mosailem; 68' Assiri	Stadium: King Fahd International Stadium; Attendance: 26,653; Referee: Svein Oddvar Moen (Norway)

14 December 2015 12	Hajer	1–5	Al-Hilal	Al-Hasa
17:30	Al-Hamdan 11'; Al-Barakah (yellow card) 39'	Report	(yellow card) 16' Kaabi; 18' Al-Faraj; 30' Darwish; 65' Al-Zori; 72' (pen.) Aílton; 90+2' Jahfali	Stadium: Prince Abdullah bin Jalawi Stadium; Attendance: 6,754; Referee: Mishari Al-Mishari

19 December 2015 13	Al-Faisaly	0–1	Al-Hilal	Al Majma'ah
17:50	Sowid (yellow card) 89'	Report	86' Al-Qahtani	Stadium: King Salman Sport City Stadium; Attendance: 1,750; Referee: Khaled Salwi

24 December 2015 7	Al-Nassr	1–2	Al-Hilal	Riyadh
20:00	Abdulghani (yellow card) 7'; Al-Sahlawi 45+2' (pen.); Al-Ghamdi (yellow card) 65'; Al-Jebreen (yellow card) 85'	Report	(yellow card) 10' Digão; 26' Al-Dawsari; 72' Eduardo	Stadium: King Fahd International Stadium; Attendance: 21,716; Referee: Sergei Karasev (Russia)

27 January 2016 14	Al-Wehda	1–3	Al-Hilal	Makkah
20:30	Belal (yellow card) 44'; Haroon (yellow card) 75'; Nfor 81'	Report	45' Al-Faraj; (yellow card) 45+1' Jahfali; 52' Eduardo; (yellow card) 53' Otayf; 72' Al-Zori	Stadium: King Abdul Aziz Stadium; Attendance: 10,939; Referee: Turki Al-Khudair

5 February 2016 15	Al-Hilal	3–3	Al-Fateh	Riyadh
18:20	Al-Zori 64', 90+2'; Al-Shamrani 75'; Eduardo (yellow card) 81'	Report	5', 79' Élton; (yellow card) 25', (goal) 59' Falcón; (yellow card) 76' (yellow-red card) 90' Al-Mubarak	Stadium: Prince Faisal bin Fahd Stadium; Attendance: 11,104; Referee: Fahad Al-Mirdasi

11 February 2016 16	Al-Raed	0–1	Al-Hilal	Buraidah
18:35	Al-Bishi (yellow card) 23'; Muwallad (yellow card) 56'	Report	82' Eduardo	Stadium: King Abdullah Sport City Stadium; Attendance: 12,324; Referee: Mohammed Al-Hoaish

15 February 2016 17	Al-Taawoun	1–0	Al-Hilal	Buraidah
18:40	Efoulou 21' (pen.); Muaad (yellow card) 54'; Manoel (yellow card) 90'	Report	(yellow card) 19' K. Sharhili; (yellow card) 43' Jahfali	Stadium: King Abdullah Sport City Stadium; Attendance: 12,507; Referee: Milorad Mažić (Serbia)

27 February 2016 18	Al-Hilal	0–1	Al-Ittihad	Riyadh
20:45	Jahfali (yellow card) 5'	Report	6' Al-Sahafi; (yellow card) 21' F.Al-Muwallad; (yellow card) 31' Asiri; (yellow card) 71' Khaibari; (yellow card) 79' Hamzah; (yellow card) 87' Muntari	Stadium: King Fahd International Stadium; Attendance: 17,020; Referee: Viktor Kassai (Hungary)

6 March 2016 19	Al-Qadisiyah	0–0	Al-Hilal	Dammam
18:25	Al-Obaid (yellow card) 51'; Abdul-Amir (yellow card) 78'; Barnawi (yellow card) 87'; Jandson (yellow card) 90+3'	Report		Stadium: Prince Mohamed bin Fahd Stadium; Attendance: 12,050; Referee: Martin Strömbergsson (Sweden)

10 March 2016 20	Al-Hilal	2–0	Al-Nassr	Riyadh
20:30	Al-Breik (yellow card) 28'; S.Al-Dawsari 37'; Aílton 68'; Digão (yellow card) 77'; Al-Faraj (yellow card) 90'	Report	(yellow card) 49' Al-Sahlawi; (yellow card) 51' Al-Ghamdi; (yellow card) 71' Abdulghani	Stadium: King Fahd International Stadium; Attendance: 21,824; Referee: Nicola Rizzoli (Italy)

2 April 2016 21	Al-Khaleej	0–3	Al-Hilal	Dammam
18:35	Sylla (yellow card) 68'	Report	3' Al-Salem; 15' S. Al-Dawsari; 58' Al-Shalhoub; (yellow card) 62' Kariri	Stadium: Prince Mohamed bin Fahd Stadium; Attendance: 6,714; Referee: Mohammed Al-Qarni

9 April 2016 22	Al-Hilal	1–1	Al-Shabab	Riyadh
21:00	Aílton 11'; Al-Faraj (yellow card) 57'; Jahfali (yellow card) 90'	Report	(yellow card) 59' Al-Khaibri; (yellow card) 69' Al-Sulayhem; 82' Benyettou	Stadium: King Fahd International Stadium; Attendance: 5,175; Referee: Marai Al-Awaji

15 April 2016 23	Najran	2–3	Al-Hilal	Jeddah
21:10	Ferreira 61', (yellow card) 77'; Abbas (yellow card) 65'; Al-Mousa 75'	Report	28' Eduardo; 53' Al-Salem; 70' A. Al-Dawsari	Stadium: King Abdullah Sports City; Attendance: 18,777; Referee: Mohammed Al-Nuhait

24 April 2016 24	Al-Ahli	3–1	Al-Hilal	Jeddah
21:15	Al-Somah 46', 50'; Al-Jassim (yellow card) 71'; Al-Mogahwi 90+4', (yellow card) 90+5'	Report	10' Eduardo; (yellow card) 15' Jahfali; (yellow card) 64' (yellow-red card) 80' Kariri; (yellow card) 70' Al-Shahrani	Stadium: King Abdullah Sports City; Attendance: 56,293; Referee: Felix Brych (Germany)

8 May 2016 25	Al-Hilal	4–1	Hajer	Riyadh
21:00	Al-Qahtani 27', 68', 71', 84'; Al-Sawat (yellow card) 82'; Al-Qarni (yellow card) 90'	Report	(yellow card) 25' Al-Raheeb; 90+1' Nu'man	Stadium: Prince Faisal bin Fahd Stadium; Attendance: 2,371; Referee: Mishari Al-Mishari

12 May 2016 26	Al-Hilal	0–0	Al-Faisaly	Riyadh
19:10	Ghazi (yellow card) 68'	Report	(yellow card) 56' Al-Safri	Stadium: Prince Faisal bin Fahd Stadium; Attendance: 2,743; Referee: Majed Al-Shamrani

=== Crown Prince Cup ===
Al-Hilal started the tournament directly to the round of 16, as one of last year's finalists. All times were local, AST (UTC+3).

30 November 2015 Round of 16	Al-Taawoun	1–2	Al-Hilal	Buraidah
19:30	Moath (yellow card) 23'; Al-Khamees 90+2'	Report	19' (pen.) Al-Shamrani; (yellow card) 30' Kariri; 56', (yellow card) 77' Aílton; (yellow card) 83' Darwish; (yellow card) 87' Al-Faraj	Stadium: King Abdullah Sport City Stadium; Referee: Shukri Al Hanfosh

28 December 2015 Quarter-final	Al-Hilal	4–1	Al-Qadisiyah	Riyadh
17:50	Eduardo 36', 65'; Kariri (yellow card) 45+3'; Al-Shamrani 54' (pen.); Darwish (yellow card) 75'; Sharahily (yellow card) 81'; Al-Qahtani 84'; Jahfali (yellow card) 90+3'	Report	39' Hazazi; (yellow card) 52' Masrahi	Stadium: Prince Faisal bin Fahd Stadium; Referee: Mohammed Al-Hoaish

1 January 2016 Semi-final	Al-Hilal	4–0	Al-Shabab	Riyadh
20:00	Al-Shahrani 25'; Aílton 48', (yellow card) 64'; Eduardo 69' (pen.); Al-Faraj 74'	Report	(yellow card) 44' Affonso; (yellow card) 64' Al-Owais; (yellow card) 65' Arismendi	Stadium: King Fahd International Stadium; Attendance: 11,970; Referee: Shukri Al-Hanfosh

19 February 2016 Final	Al-Hilal	2–1	Al-Ahli	Riyadh
20:30	Al-Shamrani 4'; Al-Abed 33'; S. Al-Dawsari (yellow card) 80'; K. Sharhili (yellow card) 90+4'	Report	(yellow card) 36', (goal) 90' Al-Jassim; (yellow card) 47' Al-Harbi; (yellow card) 83' M. Hawsawi	Stadium: King Fahd International Stadium; Referee: Marai Al-Awaji

=== King Cup ===
All times are local, AST (UTC+3).

21 January 2016 Round of 32	Al-Nahda	1–2	Al-Hilal	Dammam
17:55	Diakité 26'		83' Aílton; 86' Jahfali	Stadium: Prince Mohamed bin Fahd Stadium; Referee: Abdullah Al Aoydan

31 January 2016 Round of 16	Al-Nojoom	0–2	Al-Hilal	Al-Hasa
19:30		Report	11', 55' Eduardo; (yellow card) 90+3' Kwak	Stadium: Prince Abdullah bin Jalawi Stadium; Referee: Sultan Al Harbi

12 April 2016 Quarter-final	Al-Mojzel	1–4	Al-Hilal	Al Majma'ah
19:05	Al-Mutairi (yellow card) 28'; Al-Bishi 83'	Report	63', 74' Al-Qahtani; (yellow card) 71' Al-Qarni; 80' Kaabi; 90' Aílton	Stadium: King Salman Sport City Stadium; Referee: Khaled Salwi

29 April 2016 Semi-final	Al-Hilal	2–3 (a.e.t.)	Al-Ahli	Riyadh
20:45	Al-Zori 7'; Digão (yellow card) 44' (yellow-red card) 120+2'; Jahfali (yellow card) 53'; Al-Salem 73' (pen.), (yellow card) 73'; Kariri (yellow card) 83' (yellow-red card) 109'; Al-Shahrani (yellow card) 120'; S. Al-Dawsari (yellow card) 120+2'	Report	59', 78' Assiri; (yellow card) 111' Al-Somah; 114' Marquinho	Stadium: King Fahd International Stadium; Referee: Milorad Mažić (Serbia)

=== 2015 AFC Champions League ===
==== Knockout stage ====
===== Quarter-finals =====
25 August 2015 First leg	Al-Hilal (Saudi Arabia)	4–1	(Qatar) Lekhwiya	Riyadh, Saudi Arabia
20:50 (UTC+3)	Aílton 11'; Ka'abi 34'; C. Eduardo 36', 86'; Al-Faraj (yellow card) 78'	Report	17' Msakni; (yellow card) 78' Abdullah	Stadium: King Fahd International Stadium; Attendance: 1,190; Referee: Ben Williams (Australia)

15 September 2015 Second leg	Lekhwiya (Qatar)	2–2 (3–6 agg.)	(Saudi Arabia) Al-Hilal	Doha, Qatar
19:00 (UTC+3)	El-Sayed (yellow card) 15'; Mohammad 45+2'; Yasser (yellow card) 69'; Flores 71', (yellow card) 90'; Weiss (yellow card) 82'; Musa (yellow card) 90'	Report	26' C. Eduardo; (yellow card) 79' Darwish; (yellow card) 82' S. Al-Dawsari; 87' Digão; (yellow card) 89' Al-Breik	Stadium: Abdullah bin Khalifa Stadium; Attendance: 5,439; Referee: Ryuji Sato (Japan)

===== Semi-finals =====
29 September 2015 First leg	Al-Hilal (Saudi Arabia)	1–1	(United Arab Emirates) Al-Ahli	Riyadh, Saudi Arabia
20:15 (UTC+3)	Ka'abi (yellow card) 17'; Aílton 82'; Al-Faraj (yellow card) 90+5'	Report	57', (yellow card) 77' Lima; (yellow card) 90+1' Al-Fardan; (yellow card) 90+5' Abbas	Stadium: King Fahd International Stadium; Attendance: 53,263; Referee: Valentin Kovalenko (Uzbekistan)

20 October 2015 Second leg	Al-Ahli (United Arab Emirates)	3–2 (4–3 agg.)	(Saudi Arabia) Al-Hilal	Dubai, UAE
18:45 (UTC+3)	Lima 17'; Ribeiro 45'; Al-Hammadi (yellow card) 85'; Hassan (yellow card) 90'; Kwon 90+4'	Report	51' Aílton; 64' C. Eduardo; (yellow card) 86' Al-Sudairy; (yellow card) 90' Al-Shamrani; (yellow card) 90+3' Al-Abed	Stadium: Al-Rashid Stadium; Attendance: 9,800; Referee: Nawaf Shukralla (Bahrain)

=== 2016 AFC Champions League ===
==== Group stage ====
Pos	Team	Pld	W	D	L	GF	GA	GD	Pts	Qualification	TRA	HIL	PAK	JAZ
1	(Iran) Tractor Sazi	6	4	0	2	10	3	+7	12	Advance to knockout stage	—	1–2	2–0	4–0
2	(Saudi Arabia) Al-Hilal	6	3	2	1	10	7	+3	11	Advance to knockout stage	0–2	—	4–1	1–0
3	(Uzbekistan) Pakhtakor	6	3	1	2	10	9	+1	10		1–0	2–2	—	3–0
4	(United Arab Emirates) Al-Jazira	6	0	1	5	2	13	−11	1		0–1	1–1	1–3	—

Source: AFC
Rules for classification: Group stage tiebreakers

24 February 2016 6	Pakhtakor (Uzbekistan)	2–2	(Saudi Arabia) Al-Hilal	Tashkent, Uzbekistan
14:30 UTC+3	Sokhibov (yellow card) 67'; Sergeev 70'; Khashimov 89', (yellow card) 90+2'	Report	(yellow card) 57' S.Al-Dawsari; 60' Al-Qahtani; (yellow card) 83' Kariri; 84' Al-Salem; (yellow card) 90' A.Sharahili	Stadium: Pakhtakor Markaziy Stadium; Attendance: 3,800; Referee: Chris Beath (Australia)

2 March 2016 2	Al-Hilal (Saudi Arabia)	4–1	(Uzbekistan) Pakhtakor	Riyadh, Saudi Arabia
20:30 UTC+3	Al-Zori 55'; Orahovac 58' (o.g.); Kaabi 61', 78'	Report	(yellow card) 28' Tajiev; 31' Sergeev; (yellow card) 69' Khashimov; (yellow card) 86' Iskanderov	Stadium: Prince Faisal bin Fahd Stadium; Attendance: 9,456; Referee: Nawaf Shukralla (Bahrain)

15 March 2016 3	Al-Jazira (United Arab Emirates)	1–1	(Saudi Arabia) Al-Hilal	Abu Dhabi, Emirates
19:35 UTC+3	Juma (yellow card) 62', (goal) 90+4'	Report	9' Aílton; (yellow card) 43' Digão	Stadium: Mohammed Bin Zayed Stadium; Attendance: 14,372; Referee: Ko Hyung-jin (South Korea)

6 April 2016 4	Al-Hilal (Saudi Arabia)	1–0	(United Arab Emirates) Al-Jazira	Riyadh, Saudi Arabia
20:45 UTC+3	Aílton 36'	Report	(yellow card) 25' Fayez; (yellow card) 34' Sebil; (yellow card) 89' Juma	Stadium: Prince Faisal bin Fahd Stadium; Attendance: 10,316; Referee: Mohd Amirul Izwan Yaacob (Malaysia)

19 April 2016 5	Al-Hilal (Saudi Arabia)	0–2	(Iran) Tractor Sazi	Doha, Qatar
18:35 UTC+3	Eduardo (yellow card) 45'	Report	66' Nong; 81' Hatami	Stadium: Suheim Bin Hamad Stadium; Attendance: 2,642; Referee: Peter Green (Australia)

3 May 2016 1	Tractor Sazi (Iran)	1–2	(Saudi Arabia) Al-Hilal	Muscat, Oman
17:30 UTC+3	Nong 48'; Ashouri (yellow card) 73'	Report	15' S. Al-Dawsari; (yellow card) 29' Jahfali; (yellow card) 45+3' Otayf; 71' Aílton; (yellow card) 90+2' Al-Thunayan	Stadium: Sultan Qaboos Sports Complex; Attendance: 8,545; Referee: Kim Jong-hyeok (South Korea)

==== Knockout stage ====
===== Round of 16 =====
17 May 2016 First leg	Al-Hilal (Saudi Arabia)	0–0	(Uzbekistan) Lokomotiv Tashkent	Riyadh, Saudi Arabia
21:05 UTC+3		Report	(yellow card) 27' Tukhtakhodjaev; (yellow card) 56' Nesterov; (yellow card) 77' Makharadze	Stadium: King Fahd International Stadium; Attendance: 14,132; Referee: Ko Hyung-jin (South Korea)

24 May 2016 Second leg	Lokomotiv Tashkent (Uzbekistan)	2–1 (2–1 agg.)	(Saudi Arabia) Al-Hilal	Tashkent, Uzbekistan
16:00 UTC+3	Tukhtakhodjaev 26'; Alibaev (yellow card) 32'; Shaakhmedov (yellow card) 52'; Fayziev 56'	Report	(yellow card) 22' Al-Abed; (yellow card) 52' Al-Faraj; (yellow card) 72' Jahfali; 89' (pen.) Al-Shalhoub; (yellow card) 90+1' Al-Shahrani	Stadium: Bunyodkor Stadium; Attendance: 5,271; Referee: Ben Williams (Australia)

== Statistics ==
=== Goalscorers ===
Rank	No.	Pos	Nat	Name	League	Super Cup	Crown Prince Cup	King Cup	2015 CL	2016 CL	Total
1	3	MF	(Brazil)	Carlos Eduardo	14	1	3	2	4	0	24
2	9	FW	(Brazil)	Aílton Almeida	6	0	2	2	3	3	16
3	20	FW	(Saudi Arabia)	Yasser Al-Qahtani	6	0	1	2	0	1	10
4	15	FW	(Saudi Arabia)	Nasser Al-Shamrani	4	0	3	0	0	0	7
4	4	DF	(Saudi Arabia)	Abdullah Al-Zori	5	0	0	1	0	1	7
6	19	MF	(Saudi Arabia)	Khalid Kaabi	1	0	0	1	1	2	5
7	16	FW	(Saudi Arabia)	Yousef Al-Salem	2	0	0	1	0	1	4
7	29	MF	(Saudi Arabia)	Salem Al-Dawsari	3	0	0	0	0	1	4
9	7	MF	(Saudi Arabia)	Salman Al-Faraj	2	0	1	0	0	0	3
10	2	DF	(Saudi Arabia)	Mohammed Al-Breik	2	0	0	0	0	0	2
10	12	DF	(Saudi Arabia)	Yasser Al-Shahrani	1	0	1	0	0	0	2
10	70	DF	(Saudi Arabia)	Mohammed Jahfali	1	0	0	1	0	0	2
10	24	MF	(Saudi Arabia)	Nawaf Al-Abed	1	0	1	0	0	0	2
10	10	MF	(Saudi Arabia)	Mohammad Al-Shalhoub	1	0	0	0	0	1	2
15	26	DF	(Brazil)	Digão	0	0	0	0	1	0	1
15	14	MF	(Saudi Arabia)	Saud Kariri	1	0	0	0	0	0	1
15	25	MF	(Saudi Arabia)	Faisel Darwish	1	0	0	0	0	0	1
15	11	MF	(Saudi Arabia)	Abdullaziz Al-Dawsari	1	0	0	0	0	0	1
Own goal					0	0	0	0	0	1	1
Total					52	1	12	10	9	11	95

Last Updated: 24 May 2016

=== Assists ===
Rank	No.	Pos	Nat	Name	League	Super Cup	Crown Prince Cup	King Cup	2015 CL	2016 CL	Total
1	10	MF	(Saudi Arabia)	Mohammad Al-Shalhoub	3	0	0	0	1	3	7
1	24	MF	(Saudi Arabia)	Nawaf Al-Abed	6	0	0	0	0	1	7
3	25	MF	(Saudi Arabia)	Faisel Darwish	1	0	2	2	1	0	6
3	2	DF	(Saudi Arabia)	Mohammed Al-Breik	5	0	0	0	0	0	5
3	3	MF	(Brazil)	Carlos Eduardo	3	0	0	0	1	1	5
4	29	MF	(Saudi Arabia)	Salem Al-Dawsari	2	0	0	0	2	0	4
4	15	FW	(Saudi Arabia)	Nasser Al-Shamrani	1	0	1	2	0	0	4
8	12	DF	(Saudi Arabia)	Yasser Al-Shahrani	0	1	1	0	1	0	3
8	4	DF	(Saudi Arabia)	Abdullah Al-Zori	2	0	0	1	0	0	3
8	9	FW	(Brazil)	Aílton Almeida	3	0	0	0	0	0	3
8	7	MF	(Saudi Arabia)	Salman Al-Faraj	1	0	1	1	0	0	3
8	14	MF	(Saudi Arabia)	Saud Kariri	1	0	0	0	2	0	3
8	11	MF	(Saudi Arabia)	Abdullaziz Al-Dawsari	3	0	0	0	0	0	3
12	16	FW	(Saudi Arabia)	Yousef Al-Salem	2	0	0	0	0	0	2
14	19	MF	(Saudi Arabia)	Khalid Kaabi	1	0	0	0	0	0	1
14	23	DF	(South Korea)	Kwak Tae-hwi	1	0	0	0	0	0	1
14	26	DF	(Brazil)	Digão	1	0	0	0	0	0	1
14	70	DF	(Saudi Arabia)	Mohammed Jahfali	0	0	1	0	0	0	1
14	20	FW	(Saudi Arabia)	Yasser Al-Qahtani	1	0	0	0	0	0	1
Total					37	1	6	6	8	5	63

Last Updated: 8 May 2016

=== Clean sheets ===
Rank	No.	Pos	Nat	Player	League	Super Cup	Crown Prince Cup	King Cup	2015 CL	2016 CL	Total
1	1	GK	(Saudi Arabia)	Khalid Sharahili	10	1	1	1	0	0	13
2	22	GK	(Saudi Arabia)	Fahad Al-Thunayan	1	0	0	0	0	2	3
Total					11	1	1	1	0	2	16

Last Updated: 24 May 2016

== Notes ==
1. Al-Hilal played their quarter-final home match behind closed doors due to crowd trouble.
2. On 25 January 2016, the AFC announced changes to the schedule regarding teams from Iran and Saudi Arabia to be played on matchdays 5 and 6 (19–20 April and 3–4 May) due to the deteriorating Iran–Saudi Arabia relations, also the venues will be decided after an evaluation deadline of 15 March 2016. If there has not been a return to normal relations between the two countries by then, all matches between teams from Iran and Saudi Arabia will be played at neutral venues.
3. On 31 March 2016, the AFC announced that matches between teams from Iran and Saudi Arabia will be played on neutral venues.
