= 2013–14 Al-Hilal FC season =

Al Hilal
2013–14 season
- President: (Saudi Arabia) Abdulrahman bin Musa'ad
- Manager: (Saudi Arabia) Sami Al Jaber
- Stadium: King Fahd Stadium; Prince Faisal bin Fahd Stadium
- SPL: 2nd
- Crown Prince Cup: Runners-up
- King Cup: Quarter-finals
- Champions League: 2014: Quarter-finals^{1}
- Top goalscorer: League: Nasser Al-Shamrani (21); All: Nasser Al-Shamrani (30)
- Highest home attendance: 49,650 vs Sepahan (22 April 2014, Champions League)
- Lowest home attendance: 2,589 vs Al-Nahda (28 March 2014, Pro League)
- Average home league attendance: 12,617
Home colours	Away colours	Third colours

The 2013–14 Al-Hilal FC season was Al-Hilal Saudi Football Club's 57th in existence and 38th consecutive season in the top flight of Saudi Arabian football. Along with Pro League, the club participated in the AFC Champions League, Crown Prince Cup, and the King Cup.

== Players ==
=== Squad information ===
Players and squad numbers.
Note: Flags indicate national team as has been defined under FIFA eligibility rules. Players may hold more than one non-FIFA nationality.

No.	Nat.	Position	Name	Date Of Birth (Age)
Goalkeepers
28	(Saudi Arabia)	GK	Abdullah Al-Sudairy	2 February 1992 (aged 22)
30	(Saudi Arabia)	GK	Fayz Al-Sabiay	9 October 1982 (aged 31)
32	(Saudi Arabia)	GK	Hussain Shae'an	1 November 1984 (aged 29)
Defenders
2	(Saudi Arabia)	RB	Sultan Al-Bishi	28 January 1990 (aged 24)
3	(Saudi Arabia)	CB	Yahya Al-Musalem	7 January 1987 (aged 27)
4	(Saudi Arabia)	LB / CB	Abdullah Al-Zori	13 August 1987 (aged 26)
12	(Saudi Arabia)	LB / RB	Yasser Al-Shahrani	22 May 1992 (aged 22)
25	(Saudi Arabia)	CB	Majed Al Marshadi	1 November 1984 (aged 29)
23	(South Korea)	CB	Kwak Tae-Hwi	8 July 1981 (aged 32)
26	(Brazil)	CB	Digão	7 May 1988 (aged 26)
33	(Saudi Arabia)	CB	Sultan Al-Deayea	8 March 1993 (aged 21)
35	(Saudi Arabia)	CB	Ahmed Sharahili	5 August 1994 (aged 19)
Midfielders
6	(Saudi Arabia)	DM / CM	Mohammed Al-Qarni	24 November 1989 (aged 24)
7	(Brazil)	CM / AM	Thiago Neves	27 February 1985 (aged 29)
14	(Ecuador)	RM	Segundo Castillo	15 May 1982 (aged 32)
10	(Saudi Arabia)	AM / LW	Mohammad Al-Shalhoub	8 December 1980 (aged 33)
11	(Saudi Arabia)	AM / LM	Abdullaziz Al-Dawsari	11 October 1988 (aged 25)
13	(Saudi Arabia)	AM / LM / LW	Salman Al-Faraj (C)	8 January 1989 (aged 25)
27	(Saudi Arabia)	CM	Saud Kariri	8 June 1980 (aged 34)
18	(Saudi Arabia)	DM	Abdullah Otayf	3 August 1992 (aged 21)
24	(Saudi Arabia)	LM / RM	Nawaf Al-Abed	26 January 1990 (aged 24)
29	(Saudi Arabia)	RM	Salem Al-Dawsari	19 August 1991 (aged 22)
Forwards
15	(Saudi Arabia)	ST / CF	Nasser Al-Shamrani	23 November 1983 (aged 30)
16	(Saudi Arabia)	ST / CF	Yousef Al-Salem	4 May 1985 (aged 29)
19	(Saudi Arabia)	RW	Khalid Ka'abi	24 May 1992 (aged 22)
20	(Saudi Arabia)	ST / CF	Yasser Al-Qahtani	11 October 1982 (aged 31)

== Competitions ==
=== Overall ===
Competition	Started round	Final position / round	First match	Last match
Pro League	—	Runners-up	24 August 2013	6 April 2014
Crown Prince Cup	Round of 16	Runners-up	10 December 2013	1 February 2014
2014 ACL	Group stage	Round of 16^{1}	26 February 2014	14 May 2014
King Cup	Round of 32	Quarter-finals	17 February 2014	11 April 2014

Notes

- Note 1: Al-Hilal qualified to the Quarter-finals.

=== Overview ===
Competition	Record							
Competition	Pld	W	D	L	GF	GA	GD	Win %
Pro League	26	20	3	3	60	24	+36	76.92
King Cup	3	2	0	1	7	4	+3	66.67
Crown Prince Cup	4	3	0	1	8	3	+5	75.00
2014 ACL	8	4	3	1	16	7	+9	50.00
Total	41	29	6	6	91	38	+53	70.73

Source: Competitions

=== Pro League ===
==== League table ====
Pos	Team	Pld	W	D	L	GF	GA	GD	Pts	Qualification or relegation
1	Al-Nassr (C)	26	20	5	1	60	21	+39	65	Qualification for the AFC Champions League group stage
2	Al-Hilal	26	20	3	3	60	24	+36	63	Qualification for the AFC Champions League group stage
3	Al-Ahli	26	12	9	5	48	24	+24	45	Qualification for the AFC Champions League play-off round
4	Al-Shabab	26	9	10	7	42	38	+4	37	Qualification for the AFC Champions League group stage (Note: Al-Shabab qualified for the Champions League group stage as 2014 King Cup winners.)
5	Al-Taawoun	26	8	11	7	33	28	+5	35	Qualification for the GCC Champions League

Updated to match(es) played on 6 April 2014. Source: SLstat
Rules for classification: 1) Points; 2) Head-to-head points; 3) Head-to-head goal difference; 4) Total goal difference; 5) Total goals scored; 6) Fair-play points (Note: Head-to-head record is used only after all the matches between the teams in question have been played).
(C) Champions

==== Results summary ====
Overall								Home						Away					
Pld	W	D	L	GF	GA	GD	Pts	W	D	L	GF	GA	GD	W	D	L	GF	GA	GD
26	20	3	3	60	24	+36	63	11	0	2	35	9	+26	9	3	1	25	15	+10

Source: Competitive matches

==== Results by round ====
Round	1	2	3	4	5	6	7	8	9	10	11	12	13	14	15	16	17	18	19	20	21	22	23	24	25	26
Ground	H	A	A	H	A	H	A	H	A	H	A	A	H	A	H	H	A	H	A	H	A	H	A	H	H	A
Result	W	W	W	W	D	L	W	W	W	L	D	W	W	W	W	W	D	W	W	W	L	W	W	W	W	W
Position	2	1	1	1	1	2	2	2	1	2	2	2	2	2	2	2	2	2	2	2	2	2	2	2	2	2

Source: Competitive matches
A = Away; H = Home; W = Win; D = Draw; L = Loss

==== Matches ====
24 August 2013 1	Al Hilal	3–0	Al-Orobah	Riyadh
20:40 (UTC+03:00)	Al-Shamrani 62'; Al Marshadi 80'; Neves 83'	Report		Stadium: King Fahad International Stadium; Attendance: 9,412; Referee: Mohammed Al-Hoaish

30 August 2013 2	Al-Ettifaq	1–3	Al Hilal	Dammam
20:35 (UTC+03:00)	Papa Waigo 43'	Report	9' Al-Shalhoub; 10' Al-Shamrani; 68' S. Al-Dawsari	Stadium: Prince Mohamed bin Fahd Stadium; Attendance: 10,250; Referee: Turki Al-Khudair

14 September 2013 3	Al-Faisaly	1–3	Al Hilal	Al-Majma'ah
20:25 (UTC+03:00)	Hamzi 36'	Report	44' S. Al-Dawsari; 66' Neves; 86' A. Al-Dawsari	Stadium: King Salman Sport City Stadium; Attendance: 2,433; Referee: Fahad Al-Mirdasi

20 September 2013 4	Al Hilal	5–2	Al-Ittihad	Riyadh
20:15 (UTC+03:00)	Neves 40', 82'; Cho Sung-Hwan 76'; Hermach 81'; Al-Shamrani 88'	Report	19' Al-Muwallad; 53' Jóbson	Stadium: King Fahad International Stadium; Attendance: 31,723; Referee: Saleh Al-Hathlool

28 September 2013 5	Al-Ahli	1–1	Al Hilal	Makkah
20:10 (UTC+03:00)	César 75'	Report	77' Al-Shamrani	Stadium: King Abdul Aziz Stadium; Attendance: 15,192; Referee: Meree Al-Awagi

8 October 2013 6	Al Hilal	1–2	Al-Raed	Riyadh
20:05 (UTC+03:00)	Al-Shamrani 6'	Report	7', 34' Moreno	Stadium: King Fahad International Stadium; Attendance: 5,495; Referee: Mohammed Al-Hoaish

25 October 2013 7	Al-Taawoun	1–2	Al Hilal	Buraidah
19:45 (UTC+03:00)	Paul Alo'o 76'	Report	61' Neves; 82' (pen.) Al-Qahtani	Stadium: King Abdullah Sport City Stadium; Attendance: 8,773; Referee: Shukri Al-Hanfosh

1 November 2013 8	Al Hilal	4–1	Al-Shabab	Riyadh
19:40 (UTC+03:00)	Jahdali 10' (o.g.); Neves 30', 57'; Al-Shamrani 50'	Report	79' Assiri	Stadium: King Fahad International Stadium; Attendance: 17,295; Referee: Fahad Al-Mirdasi

6 November 2013 9	Najran	0–1	Al Hilal	Najran
19:45 (UTC+03:00)		Report	89' Neves	Stadium: Al Akhdoud Club Stadium; Attendance: 3,543; Referee: Abdulrahman Al-Amri

25 November 2013 10	Al Hilal	1–2	Al-Nassr	Riyadh
19:35 (UTC+03:00)	Al-Shamrani 75'	Report	7', 90+1' (pen.) Al-Sahlawi	Stadium: King Fahad International Stadium; Attendance: 40,193; Referee: Bergonzi Mauro

30 November 2013 11	Al-Shoulla	2–2	Al Hilal	Al-Kharj
19:35 (UTC+03:00)	Tamihi 50'; Taïr 52'	Report	49' Castillo; 83' Al-Shalhoub	Stadium: Al-Shoalah Club Stadium; Attendance: 4,248; Referee: Abbas Ibrahim

19 December 2014 12	Al-Nahda	1–2	Al Hilal	Dammam
19:35 (UTC+03:00)	Abdul-Latif 23'	Report	16' Hermach; 89' Neves	Stadium: Prince Mohamed bin Fahd Stadium; Attendance: 5,555; Referee: Turki Al-Khudair

14 December 2013 13	Al Hilal	2–0	Al-Fateh	Riyadh
15:10 (UTC+03:00)	Al-Shamrani 4'; Al-Qahtani 71'	Report		Stadium: Prince Faisal bin Fahd Stadium; Attendance: 7,736; Referee: Istvan Vad

20 December 2013 14	Al-Orobah	2–3	Al Hilal	Sakakah
15:25 (UTC+03:00)	Al-Enezi 16'; Al-Joni 50'	Report	51', 64' Al-Shamrani; 94' Al-Zori	Stadium: Al-Orobah Club Stadium; Attendance: 4,200; Referee: Khalil Jalal

28 December 2013 15	Al Hilal	5–1	Al-Ettifaq	Riyadh
15:15 (UTC+03:00)	Kwak Tae-Hwi 12'; Neves 36', 83', 87'; Al-Abed 90+3'	Report	46' Kanno	Stadium: King Fahad International Stadium; Attendance: 8,840; Referee: Abdulrahman Al-Amri

2 January 2014 16	Al Hilal	2–1	Al-Faisaly	Riyadh
19:55 (UTC+03:00)	Al-Shamrani 32', 71' (pen.)	Report	27' Belal	Stadium: Prince Faisal bin Fahd Stadium; Attendance: 7,519; Referee: Saleh Al-Hathlool

9 January 2014 17	Al-Ittihad	2–2	Al Hilal	Makkah
20:00 (UTC+03:00)	Fallatah 7'; Al-Ghamdi 45'	Report	21' S. Al-Dawsari; 89' Al-Shamrani	Stadium: King Abdul Aziz Stadium; Attendance: 24,177; Referee: Abdulrahman Al-Amri

16 January 2014 18	Al Hilal	1–0	Al-Ahli	Riyadh
20:05 (UTC+03:00)	Al-Shamrani 24' (pen.)	Report		Stadium: King Fahad International Stadium; Attendance: 21,391; Referee: Marco Guida

25 January 2014 19	Al-Raed	0–1	Al Hilal	Buraidah
15:45 (UTC+03:00)		Report	82' Al-Deayea	Stadium: King Abdullah Sport City Stadium; Attendance: 5,309; Referee: Shukri Al-Hanfosh

28 January 2014 20	Al Hilal	1–0	Al-Taawoun	Riyadh
20:15 (UTC+03:00)	Al-Qahtani 3'	Report		Stadium: King Fahad International Stadium; Attendance: 5,670; Referee: Fahad Al-Oraini

6 February 2014 21	Al-Shabab	1–0	Al Hilal	Riyadh
20:20 (UTC+03:00)	Muath 90+1'	Report		Stadium: King Fahad International Stadium; Attendance: 12,435; Referee: Duarte Gomes

13 February 2014 22	Al Hilal	2–0	Najran	Riyadh
20:25 (UTC+03:00)	Cheklam 61' (o.g.); Castillo 78'	Report		Stadium: King Fahad International Stadium; Attendance: 3,293; Referee: Fahad Al-Mirdasi

21 February 2014 23	Al-Nassr	3–4	Al Hilal	Riyadh
20:20 (UTC+03:00)	Élton 8', 90+6'; Al-Sahlawi 79'	Report	3', 28' Al-Qahtani; 65' Al-Shamrani; 71' Neves	Stadium: King Fahad International Stadium; Attendance: 48,730; Referee: Paolo Tagliavento

23 March 2014 24	Al Hilal	2–0	Al-Shoulla	Riyadh
20:25 (UTC+03:00)	S. Al-Dawsari 30'; Al-Shamrani 83'	Report		Stadium: Prince Faisal bin Fahd Stadium; Attendance: 2,859; Referee: Saleh Al-Hathlool

28 March 2014 25	Al Hilal	6–0	Al-Nahda	Riyadh
20:35 (UTC+03:00)	Al-Qahtani 8'; Al-Shamrani 12', 57', 63', 87'; A. Al-Dawsari 51'	Report		Stadium: Prince Faisal bin Fahd Stadium; Attendance: 2,589; Referee: Shukri Al-Hanfosh

6 April 2014 26	Al-Fateh	0–1	Al Hilal	Al-Ahsa
20:35 (UTC+03:00)		Report	3' Al-Shamrani	Stadium: Prince Abdullah bin Jalawi Stadium; Attendance: 2,519; Referee: Abdulaziz Al-Funaitel

=== Crown Prince Cup ===
Al-Hilal started the Crown Prince Cup directly in the round of 16, as one of last year's finalists.

10 December 2013 Round of 16	Al-Hilal	4–1	Al-Shoulla	Riyadh
20:20 (UTC+03:00)	Al-Dawsari 17'; Al-Qahtani 26', 66'; Al-Deayea 60'	Report	35' Kondo	Stadium: Prince Faisal bin Fahd Stadium

23 December 2013 Quarter-finals	Al-Raed	0–1	Al Hilal	Buraidah
15:20 (UTC+03:00)		Report	41' S. Al-Dawsari	Stadium: King Abdullah Sport City Stadium; Referee: Khaled Al-Sinany

21 January 2014 Semi-finals	Al-Fateh	0–2	Al Hilal	Al-Hasa
15:30 (UTC+03:00)		Report	65' (pen.) Neves; 87' Al-Shamrani	Stadium: Prince Abdullah bin Jalawi Stadium

1 February 2014 Final	Al-Nassr	2–1	Al Hilal	Riyadh
20:15 (UTC+03:00)	Al-Daeyea 24' (o.g.); Al-Sahlawi 59' (pen.)	Report	2' Al-Shamrani	Stadium: King Fahd International Stadium; Referee: Damir Skomina (Slovenia)

=== King Cup ===
17 February 2014 Round of 32	Al-Qadisiyah	2–4	Al Hilal	Dammam
20:20 (UTC+03:00)	Al-Maghati 5'; Al-Amri 75' (pen.)	Report	4' Castillo; 38' Digão; 45' (o.g.) Jaafari; 70' Al-Shalhoub	Stadium: Prince Mohamed bin Fahd Stadium

8 March 2014 Round of 16	Al-Zulfi	1–3	Al Hilal	Al Zulfi
16:15 (UTC+03:00)	Al-Ghannam 70' (pen.)	Report	8' Al-Salem; 62' (pen.) Al-Qahtani; 77' A. Al-Dawsari	Stadium: Al-Zulfi Stadium

11 April 2014 Quarter-finals	Al Hilal	0–1	Al-Shabab	Riyadh
20:50 (UTC+03:00)		Report	71' Rafinha	Stadium: King Fahd International Stadium

=== 2014 AFC Champions League ===
==== Group stage ====
Pos	Team	Pld	W	D	L	GF	GA	GD	Pts	Qualification	HIL	SAD	AHL	SEP
1	(Saudi Arabia) Al-Hilal	6	2	3	1	12	7	+5	9	Advance to knockout stage	—	5–0	2–2	1–0
2	(Qatar) Al-Sadd	6	2	2	2	8	14	−6	8	Advance to knockout stage	2–2	—	2–1	3–1
3	(United Arab Emirates) Al-Ahli	6	1	4	1	6	6	0	7		0–0	1–1	—	0–0
4	(Iran) Sepahan	6	2	1	3	9	8	+1	7		3–2	4–0	1–2	—

26 February 2014 1	Al Hilal (Saudi Arabia)	2–2	(United Arab Emirates) Al-Ahli	Riyadh, Saudi Arabia
20:25 (UTC+03:00)	Al-Shamrani 60', 74'	Report	53' Jiménez; 58' Grafite	Stadium: King Fahd International Stadium; Attendance: 38,520; Referee: Valentin Kovalenko

12 March 2014 2	Sepahan (Iran)	3–2	(Saudi Arabia) Al Hilal	Tahran, Iran
19:00 (UTC+03:00)	Bulku 18'; Sharifi 72'; Sukaj 90+1'	Report	28' Castillo; 33' Neves	Stadium: Foolad Shahr Stadium; Attendance: 3,250; Referee: Ben Williams

19 March 2014 3	Al-Sadd (Qatar)	2–2	(Saudi Arabia) Al Hilal	Doha, Qatar
18:45 (UTC+03:00)	Al-Bloushi 26'; Belhadj 66'	Report	45+1', 56' Neves	Stadium: Jassim Bin Hamad Stadium; Attendance: 7,761; Referee: Kim Sang-woo

1 April 2014 4	Al Hilal (Saudi Arabia)	5–0	(Qatar) Al-Sadd	Riyadh, Saudi Arabia
20:40 (UTC+03:00)	Al-Qahtani 3' (pen.); Al-Deayea 28'; Al-Shamrani 34', 58', 62'	Report		Stadium: King Fahd International Stadium; Attendance: 18,321; Referee: Ryuji Sato

15 April 2014 5	Al-Ahli (United Arab Emirates)	0–0	(Saudi Arabia) Al Hilal	Dubai, UAE
20:30 (UTC+03:00)		Report		Stadium: Al-Rashid Stadium; Attendance: 9,400; Referee: Kim Jong-hyeok

22 April 2014 6	Al Hilal (Saudi Arabia)	1–0	(Iran) Sepahan	Riyadh, Saudi Arabia
20:50 (UTC+03:00)	Al-Shamrani 45+2'	Report		Stadium: King Fahd International Stadium; Attendance: 49,650; Referee: Yuichi Nishimura

==== Knockout stage ====
===== Round of 16 =====
7 May 2014 First leg	Bunyodkor (Uzbekistan)	0–1	(Saudi Arabia) Al Hilal	Tashkent, Uzbekistan
16:00 (UTC+03:00)		Report	38' S. Al-Dawsari	Stadium: Pakhtakor Markaziy Stadium, Tashkent; Attendance: 5,360; Referee: Mohd Amirul Izwan Bin Yaacob

14 May 2014 Second leg	Al Hilal (Saudi Arabia)	3–0 (4–0 agg.)	(Uzbekistan) Bunyodkor	Riyadh, Saudi Arabia
21:00 (UTC+03:00)	Al-Qahtani 20'; Al-Shamrani 47'; S. Al-Dawsari 58'	Report		Stadium: King Fahd International Stadium; Attendance: 40,851; Referee: Ben Williams

== Statistics ==
=== Goalscorers ===
Rank	No.	Pos	Nat	Name	Pro League	King Cup	Crown Prince Cup	2014 ACL	Total
1	15	FW	(Saudi Arabia)	Nasser Al-Shamrani	21	0	2	7	30
2	7	MF	(Brazil)	Thiago Neves	13	0	1	3	17
3	20	FW	(Saudi Arabia)	Yasser Al Qahtani	6	1	2	2	11
4	29	MF	(Saudi Arabia)	Salem Al-Dawsari	4	0	2	2	8
5	14	MF	(Ecuador)	Segundo Castillo	2	1	0	1	4
6	33	DF	(Saudi Arabia)	Sultan Al-Deayea	1	0	1	1	3
6	11	MF	(Saudi Arabia)	Abdullaziz Al-Dawsari	2	1	0	0	3
6	10	MF	(Saudi Arabia)	Mohammad Al-Shalhoub	2	1	0	0	3
7	21	MF	(Morocco)	Adil Hermach	2	0	0	0	2
8	25	DF	(Saudi Arabia)	Majed Al Marshadi	1	0	0	0	1
8	19	DF	(South Korea)	Cho Sung-Hwan	1	0	0	0	1
8	4	DF	(Saudi Arabia)	Abdullah Al-Zori	1	0	0	0	1
8	23	DF	(South Korea)	Kwak Tae-hwi	1	0	0	0	1
8	24	MF	(Saudi Arabia)	Nawaf Al-Abed	1	0	0	0	1
8	26	DF	(Brazil)	Digao	0	1	0	0	1
8	16	FW	(Saudi Arabia)	Yousef Al-Salem	0	1	0	0	1
Total					58	6	7	16	87

=== Assists ===
Rank	No.	Pos	Nat	Name	League	King Cup	Crown Prince Cup	2014 CL	Total
1	7	MF	(Brazil)	Thiago Neves	6	0	1	3	10
2	24	MF	(Saudi Arabia)	Nawaf Al-Abed	8	0	0	0	8
3	29	MF	(Saudi Arabia)	Salem Al-Dawsari	2	0	2	3	7
4	15	FW	(Saudi Arabia)	Nasser Al-Shamrani	4	0	1	1	6
5	11	MF	(Saudi Arabia)	Abdullaziz Al-Dawsari	5	0	0	0	5
6	20	FW	(Saudi Arabia)	Yasser Al Qahtani	1	2	0	1	4
7	13	MF	(Saudi Arabia)	Salman Al-Faraj	2	1	0	0	3
7	4	DF	(Saudi Arabia)	Abdullah Al-Zori	2	0	0	1	3
8	10	MF	(Saudi Arabia)	Mohammad Al-Shalhoub	2	0	0	0	2
8	12	DF	(Saudi Arabia)	Yasser Al-Shahrani	1	0	0	1	2
8	16	FW	(Saudi Arabia)	Yousef Al-Salem	1	0	1	0	2
9	27	MF	(Saudi Arabia)	Saud Kariri	0	0	0	1	1
Total					34	3	5	11	53
