= 2014 AFC Champions League final =

- Event: 2014 AFC Champions League
Western Sydney Wanderers	Al-Hilal
(Australia)	(Saudi Arabia)
1	0
- on aggregate

First leg
Western Sydney Wanderers	Al-Hilal
1	0
- Date: 25 October 2014
- Venue: Parramatta Stadium, Sydney
- AFC Man of the Match: Salem Al-Dawsari (Al-Hilal)
- Fans' Man of the Match: Tomi Juric (Western Sydney Wanderers)
- Referee: Alireza Faghani (Iran)
- Attendance: 20,053
- Weather: Partly cloudy 22 °C (72 °F); 42% humidity

Second leg
Al-Hilal	Western Sydney Wanderers
0	0
- Date: 1 November 2014
- Venue: King Fahd International Stadium, Riyadh
- AFC Man of the Match: Ante Covic (Western Sydney Wanderers)
- Fans' Man of the Match: Nawaf Al Abed (Al-Hilal)
- Referee: Yuichi Nishimura (Japan)
- Attendance: 63,763
- Weather: Clear; 27 °C (81 °F); 51% humidity

The 2014 AFC Champions League final was the final of the 2014 AFC Champions League, the 33rd edition of the top-level Asian club football tournament organized by the Asian Football Confederation (AFC), and the 12th under the current AFC Champions League title.

The final was contested in two-legged home-and-away format between Australian team Western Sydney Wanderers and Saudi Arabian team Al-Hilal. The first leg was hosted by Western Sydney Wanderers at Parramatta Stadium in Sydney on 25 October 2014, while the second leg was hosted by Al-Hilal at the King Fahd International Stadium in Riyadh on 1 November 2014. This was the first AFC Champions League final involving an Australian club since Adelaide United in 2008, as well as the first to not involve a South Korean representative since the said final.

Western Sydney Wanderers won the match 1–0 on aggregate to become the first Australian team to win the trophy. As champions, Wanderers also earned the right to represent the AFC at the 2014 FIFA Club World Cup in Morocco, entering at the quarter-finals.

== Qualified teams ==
Team	Previous finals appearances (bold indicates winners)
(Australia) Western Sydney Wanderers	None
(Saudi Arabia) Al-Hilal	1987, **1991**, **2000**

== Venues ==
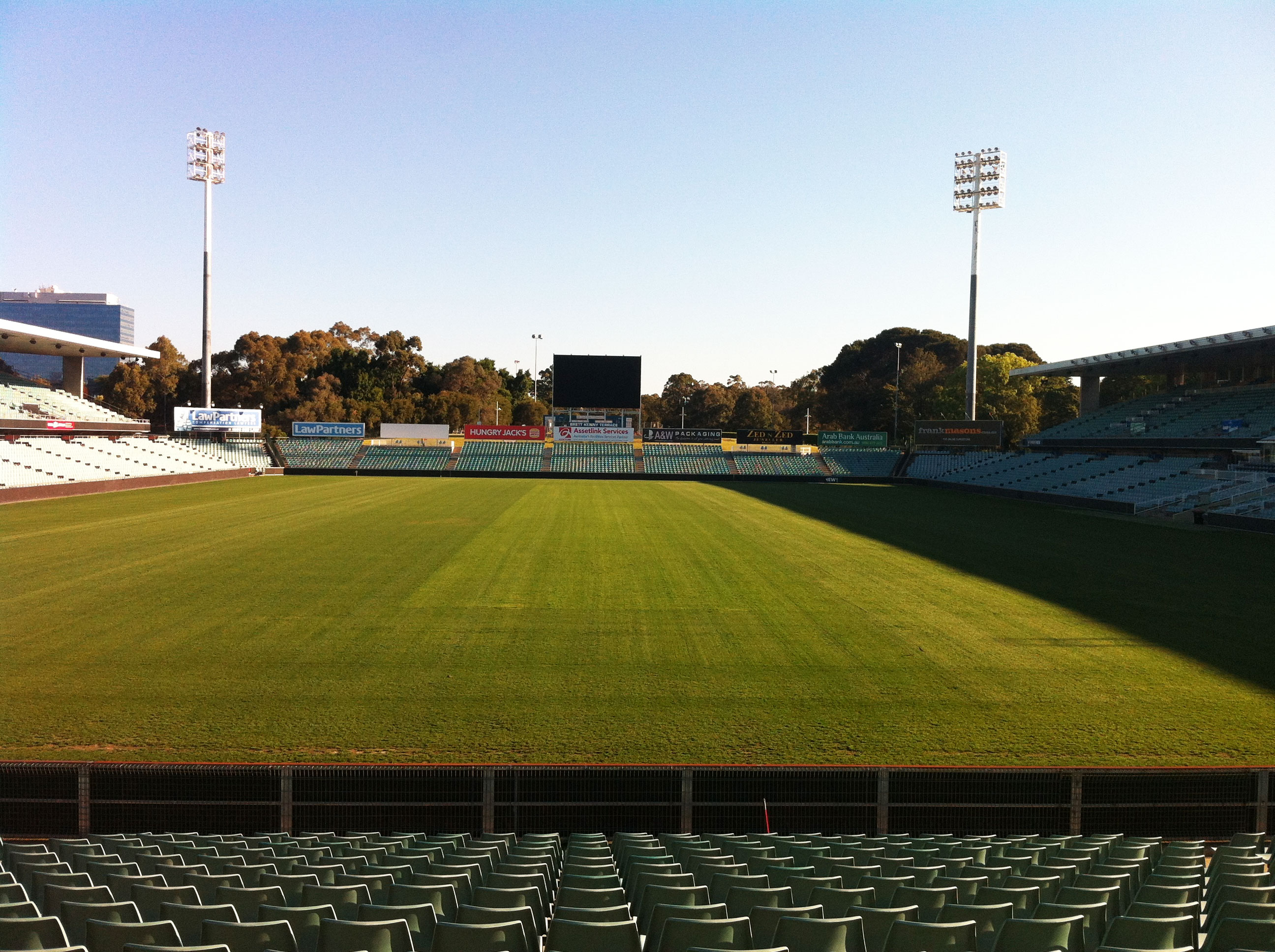
The Parramatta Stadium hosted first leg of the final.

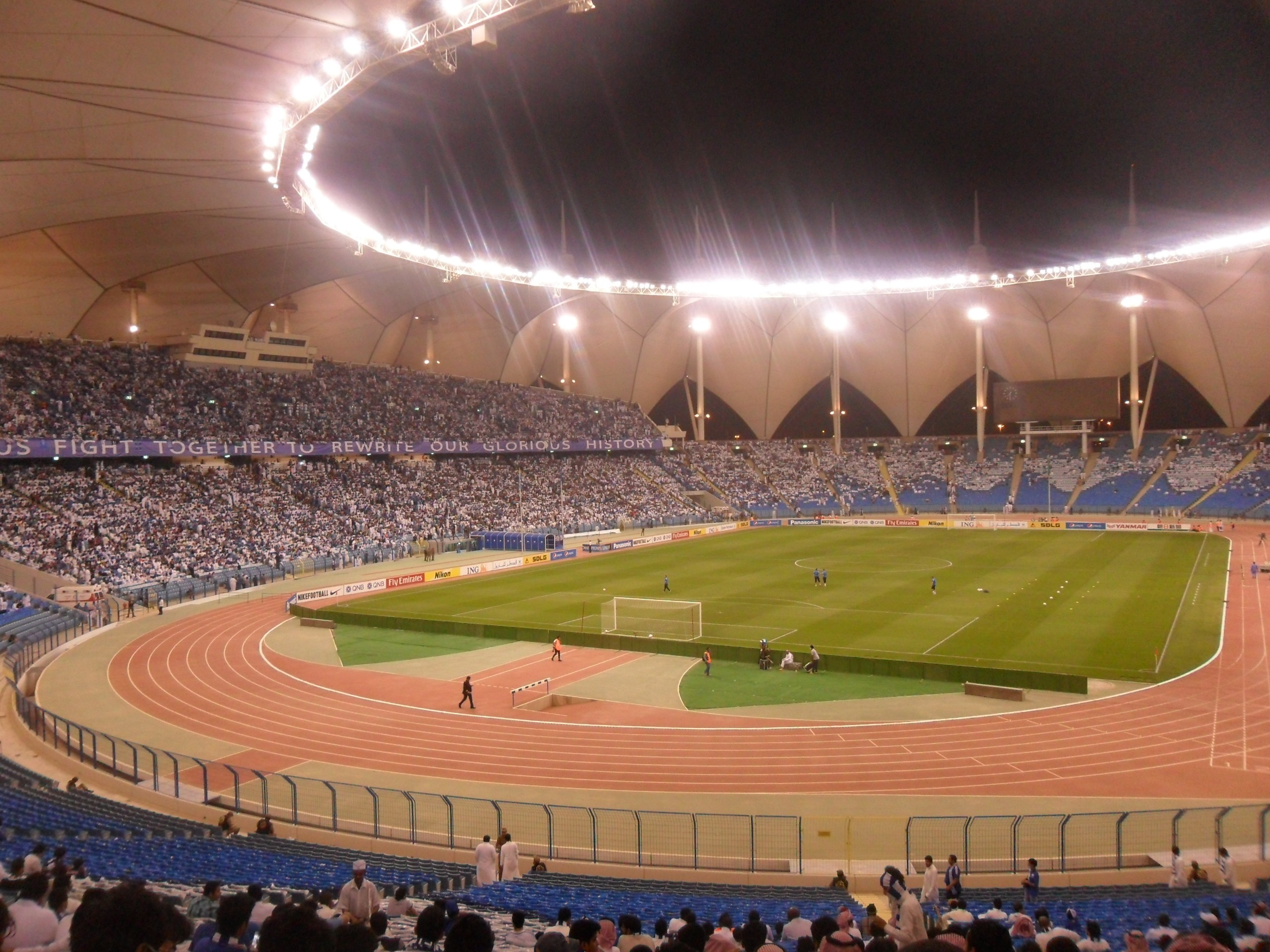
The King Fahd International Stadium hosted second leg of the final.

The 2014 AFC Champions League Final is contested in two-legged home-and-away format, held at the home of both finalists. It is the second consecutive year that the AFC adopted such an arrangement, following the success of the 2013 AFC Champions League Final.

Western Sydney Wanderers' home venue, Parramatta Stadium, is a 21,500 seated stadium located in the city of Sydney. The stadium was chosen in preference to the 45,500 seated Sydney Football Stadium and 84,000 seated Stadium Australia. Although the experience during the final was widely praised, the stadium was built in 1985, and the lack of modern facilities saw the Wanderers lobby the NSW Government to replace the stadium with a new one, as an example, because VIP patrons were kept waiting for elevators to their corporate boxes. The stadium was demolished in February 2017 and replaced on the same site by the Western Sydney Stadium.

Only one previous final has been held in Australia. In the second leg of the 2008 final, Adelaide United was defeated by Gamba Osaka 0–2 in Hindmarsh Stadium in the city of Adelaide. Gamba Osaka eventually claimed the title 5–0 on aggregate.

Al-Hilal's home venue, King Fahd International Stadium, is a 61,781 seated stadium located in the capital city of Riyadh. It is also the home ground of several other Saudi Premier League clubs.

In the history of the competition, seven finals have been held in Saudi Arabia and this final was the fifth that Riyadh hosted. The first final hosted by a Saudi Arabian city was the first ever Asian final, the 1985–86 Asian Club Championship, which was won by South Korean side Daewoo Royals 3–1 against Al-Ahli in the city of Jeddah. The next two consecutive finals, the 1986 and second leg of the 1987, were hosted in the Riyadh. The 1986 final was won by Japanese side Furukawa Electric, with Al-Hilal finishing runners-up. The 1987 final was awarded to Yomiuri FC after a walkover by Al-Hilal. Eight years later, Al-Nassr hosted the 1995 final, when Ilhwa Chunma won the match 1–0 in the King Fahd International Stadium. Al-Hilal brought the final back to Riyadh for the 1999–2000 final, in which the club won 3–2 against Japanese side Júbilo Iwata. The first leg of the 2004 final saw Al-Ittihad lose to South Korean side Seongnam Ilhwa Chunma 1–3 in the Prince Abdullah Al Faisal Stadium (6–3 on aggregate). The second leg of the 2005 final returned to Al-Ittihad's home, when the club was crowned Asian Champions after a 4–2 thrashing of United Arab Emirates side Al-Ain (5–3 on aggregate).

== Background ==
Al-Hilal have made 21 appearances in continental football and been crowned champions of Asia on two occasions, in the 1991 and the 1999–2000 edition of the tournament. The 2014 Champions League was Western Sydney Wanderers first appearance in continental football, with the club only established in 2012.

Both clubs qualified directly to the Champions League group stage through their respective leagues; Al-Hilal finished second in the 2012–13 Saudi Professional League and Western Sydney Wanderers ended their first ever season of competition (the 2012–13 A-League) as league winners.

In the lead-up to the 2014 Champions League both finalists had strong seasons, with both clubs finishing second in their respective leagues (Al-Hilal in the 2013–14 Saudi Professional League and Western Sydney Wanderers in the 2013–14 A-League). Al-Hilal also managed to reach the quarter-finals of the 2014 King Cup of Champions where they were eliminated, and Western Sydney Wanderers reached the 2014 A-League Grand Final which they eventually lost in extra time.

The clubs began competing in the Champions League group stage in February 2014 during mid-season in their domestic competitions, and they continued in the tournament after the end of the 2013–14 football seasons in Australia and Saudi Arabia due to the calendar format of the Asian tournament. For Al-Hilal, the 2014–15 Saudi Professional League started in early August before the resumption of the Champions League quarter-finals, while for the Western Sydney Wanderers, the 2014–15 A-League started in early October, after the Champions League semi-finals and before the final.

Prior to the final, Al-Hilal coach Laurențiu Reghecampf dismissed the Wanderers as "a small team", and frequently promised that Al-Hilal would win the title.

== Road to the final ==
Note: In all results below, the score of the finalist is given first (H: home; A: away).

(Australia) Western Sydney Wanderers				Round	(Saudi Arabia) Al-Hilal			
Opponent	Result			Group stage	Opponent	Result		
(South Korea) Ulsan Hyundai	1–3 (H)			Matchday 1	(United Arab Emirates) Al-Ahli	2–2 (H)		
(China) Guizhou Renhe	1–0 (A)			Matchday 2	(Iran) Sepahan	2–3 (A)		
(Japan) Kawasaki Frontale	1–0 (H)			Matchday 3	(Qatar) Al-Sadd	2–2 (A)		
(Japan) Kawasaki Frontale	1–2 (A)			Matchday 4	(Qatar) Al-Sadd	5–0 (H)		
(South Korea) Ulsan Hyundai	2–0 (A)			Matchday 5	(United Arab Emirates) Al-Ahli	0–0 (A)		
(China) Guizhou Renhe	5–0 (H)			Matchday 6	(Iran) Sepahan	1–0 (H)		
**Group H winner**: Pos / Team / Pld / W / D / L / GF / GA / GD / Pts / Qualification; 1 / (Australia) Western Sydney Wanderers / 6 / 4 / 0 / 2 / 11 / 5 / +6 / **12** / Advance to knockout stage; 2 / (Japan) Kawasaki Frontale / 6 / 4 / 0 / 2 / 7 / 5 / +2 / **12** / Advance to knockout stage; 3 / (South Korea) Ulsan Hyundai / 6 / 2 / 1 / 3 / 8 / 10 / −2 / **7**; 4 / (China) Guizhou Renhe / 6 / 1 / 1 / 4 / 4 / 10 / −6 / **4**; Source:				Final standings	**Group D winner**: Pos / Team / Pld / W / D / L / GF / GA / GD / Pts / Qualification; 1 / (Saudi Arabia) Al-Hilal / 6 / 2 / 3 / 1 / 12 / 7 / +5 / **9** / Advance to knockout stage; 2 / (Qatar) Al-Sadd / 6 / 2 / 2 / 2 / 8 / 14 / −6 / **8** / Advance to knockout stage; 3 / (United Arab Emirates) Al-Ahli / 6 / 1 / 4 / 1 / 6 / 6 / 0 / **7**; 4 / (Iran) Sepahan / 6 / 2 / 1 / 3 / 9 / 8 / +1 / **7**; Source:			
Opponent	Agg.	1st leg	2nd leg	Knock-out stage	Opponent	Agg.	1st leg	2nd leg
(Japan) Sanfrecce Hiroshima	3–3 (a)	1–3 (A)	2–0 (H)	Round of 16	(Uzbekistan) Bunyodkor	4–0	1–0 (A)	3–0 (H)
(China) Guangzhou Evergrande	2–2 (a)	1–0 (H)	1–2 (A)	Quarter-finals	(Qatar) Al-Sadd	1–0	1–0 (H)	0–0 (A)
(South Korea) FC Seoul	2–0	0–0 (A)	2–0 (H)	Semi-finals	(United Arab Emirates) Al-Ain	4–2	3–0 (H)	1–2 (A)

== Rules ==
The final was played on a home-and-away two-legged basis, with the order of legs decided by draw. The away goals rule, extra time (away goals do not apply in extra time) and penalty shoot-out were used to decide the winner if necessary.

== Match details ==
=== First leg ===
==== Summary ====
The first leg was played at Parramatta Stadium in Sydney on 25 October 2014.

The game started in a manner that did not reflect the eventual result. Moments after kick-off Salman Al-Faraj broke into the area on the left flank but couldn't find a team-mate and the Wanderers cleared the ball behind for a corner. Al-Hilal dominated possession and the chances but couldn't find any cracks in the Aussies' armoured defence. Moments before half-time Al-Hilal had their best chance of the night after a defensive clearance came off Mateo Poljak's face and into Nasser Al-Shamrani's position, but the striker skied his shot.

Super-sub Tomi Juric came on in the 58th minute and it took him merely 6 minutes to make his mark: a peach of a cross from Antony Golec on the left wing found him up front, the number 9 connecting with a right boot that saw the ball slide under Abdullah Al-Sudairy to give the Wanderers a priceless goal. Golec later described it as the best cross in his entire career.

As the clock ticked past the 70th minute Juric nearly had a brace, picking up the ball after Digão made a mistake and then went on a mazy run at the Al-Hilal defence. Juric opened up enough space for a placed shot from the edge of the penalty area, which beat the keeper but not the woodwork, the ball bouncing away from the path of Mark Bridge who would have been faced with a tap-in.

Al-Hilal had the better of the match but lacked a truly cutting edge and it proved to be their downfall. Without an away goal to show for their trip, the Wanderers will win the Champions League trophy with a win or draw at the King Fahd International Stadium in Riyadh. If the Wanderers can continue their streak of scoring in away ACL matches their opponents will need at least three goals to win the tie.

==== Details ====
25 October 2014
19:30 UTC+11

Western Sydney Wanderers (Australia)	1–0	(Saudi Arabia) Al-Hilal
Juric 64'	Report

Parramatta Stadium, Sydney
Attendance: 20,053
Referee: Alireza Faghani (Iran)

**Western Sydney Wanderers**	**Al-Hilal**

GK	1	(Australia) Ante Covic
RB	2	(Australia) Shannon Cole		(substituted off) 83'
CB	35	(Australia) Antony Golec
CB	4	(Australia) Nikolai Topor-Stanley (c)
LB	8	(Croatia) Mateo Poljak	(yellow card) 31'	(substituted off) 76'
CM	33	(Australia) Daniel Mullen
CM	18	(Italy) Iacopo La Rocca
CM	17	(Australia) Brendan Hamill
RF	7	(Australia) Labinot Haliti
CF	11	(Australia) Brendon Santalab	(yellow card) 43'	(substituted off) 58'
LF	19	(Australia) Mark Bridge
Substitutes:
GK	20	(Australia) Dean Bouzanis
DF	13	(Australia) Matthew Spiranovic		(substituted on) 76'
DF	23	(Australia) Jason Trifiro
DF	32	(Australia) Daniel Alessi
MF	10	(Brazil) Vítor Saba		(substituted on) 83'
FW	9	(Australia) Tomi Juric		(substituted on) 58'
FW	14	(New Zealand) Kwabena Appiah
Manager:
(Australia) Tony Popovic

GK	28	(Saudi Arabia) Abdullah Al-Sudairy	(yellow card) 53'
RB	4	(Saudi Arabia) Abdullah Al-Zori
CB	26	(Brazil) Digão
CB	23	(South Korea) Kwak Tae-hwi
LB	12	(Saudi Arabia) Yasser Al-Shahrani
DM	27	(Saudi Arabia) Saud Kariri (c)
DM	25	(Romania) Mihai Pintilii
CM	13	(Saudi Arabia) Salman Al-Faraj		(substituted off) 80'
RF	7	(Brazil) Thiago Neves	(yellow card) 74'
CF	15	(Saudi Arabia) Nasser Al-Shamrani
LF	29	(Saudi Arabia) Salem Al-Dawsari		(substituted off) 90+1'
Substitutes:
GK	22	(Saudi Arabia) Fahad Al-Thunayan
DF	33	(Saudi Arabia) Sultan Al-Deayea
MF	6	(Saudi Arabia) Mohammed Al-Qarni
MF	10	(Saudi Arabia) Mohammad Al-Shalhoub
MF	24	(Saudi Arabia) Nawaf Al-Abed		(substituted on) 80'
FW	9	(Saudi Arabia) Hamed Al-Hamed
FW	16	(Saudi Arabia) Yousef Al-Salem		(substituted on) 90+1'
Manager:
(Romania) Laurențiu Reghecampf

AFC Man of the Match:
(Saudi Arabia) Salem Al-Dawsari (Al-Hilal)
Fans' Man of the Match:
(Australia) Tomi Juric (Western Sydney Wanderers)

Assistant referees:
Hassan Kamranifar (Iran)
Reza Sokhandan (Iran)
Fourth official:
Nagor Amir Noor Mohamed (Malaysia)

**Match rules**

- 90 minutes.
- The first leg of a two legged tie.
- Seven named substitutes.
- Maximum of three substitutions.

==== Statistics ====
First half
	Western Sydney Wanderers	Al-Hilal
Goals scored	0	0
Total shots		
Shots on target		
Saves		
Ball possession		
Corner kicks		
Fouls committed		
Offsides		
Yellow cards	2	0
Red cards	0	0

Second half
	Western Sydney Wanderers	Al-Hilal
Goals scored	1	0
Total shots		
Shots on target		
Saves		
Ball possession		
Corner kicks		
Fouls committed		
Offsides		
Yellow cards	0	2
Red cards	0	0

Overall
	Western Sydney Wanderers	Al-Hilal
Goals scored	1	0
Total shots	6	14
Shots on target	3	4
Saves	2	1
Ball possession	42%	58%
Corner kicks	3	4
Fouls committed	13	15
Offsides	3	1
Yellow cards	2	2
Red cards	0	0

=== Second leg ===
==== Summary ====
The second leg was hosted by Al-Hilal at the King Fahd International Stadium in Riyadh on 1 November 2014.

In the 18th minute Al Hilal had the first chance of the game, swinging a free kick from the left flank that the Wanderers weren't able to get anything on, thankfully for them neither did one of their opponents, a right boot stuck out but agonisingly distant from making contact.

A minute before half-time the first penalty shout of the night was waved away by referee Yuichi Nishimura. Inside the area a ball rolled into the path of the flying Nawaf Al-Abed, Antony Golec clipped the right foot of the attacker but the theatrical leap perhaps weighed the incidence in the favour of the Australians.

After the break, it was another stonewall penalty turned down, when Salman Al-Faraj latched onto a through ball deep on the right corner of the penalty area and was clearly brought down by Ante Covic, but the goalkeeper was not punished for the indiscretion. Another potential penalty came when the ball was kicked at short range into the arms of Brendon Santalab. However, Nishimura judged that it was ball to hand rather than hand to ball.

The Saudi representative pushed on and on, pressing for a goal that would take the game into extra time and it looked certain that they had one in the 84th minute: a cutback found Yasser Al-Qahtani, who fired a shot from near the penalty spot that had no right to be saved, but the hands of Covic found a way. The ball bounced once before spinning out for a corner just inches away from the goalpost.

==== Details ====
1 November 2014
20:30 UTC+3

Al-Hilal (Saudi Arabia)	0–0	(Australia) Western Sydney Wanderers
	Report

King Fahd International Stadium, Riyadh
Attendance: 63,763
Referee: Yuichi Nishimura (Japan)

**Al-Hilal**	**Western Sydney Wanderers**

GK	28	(Saudi Arabia) Abdullah Al-Sudairy
RB	27	(Saudi Arabia) Saud Kariri (c)	(substituted off) 57'
CB	26	(Brazil) Digão
CB	23	(South Korea) Kwak Tae-hwi
LB	25	(Romania) Mihai Pintilii
RM	29	(Saudi Arabia) Salem Al-Dawsari
CM	13	(Saudi Arabia) Salman Al-Faraj
LM	12	(Saudi Arabia) Yasser Al-Shahrani
AM	7	(Brazil) Thiago Neves	(substituted off) 77'
AM	24	(Saudi Arabia) Nawaf Al-Abed	(substituted off) 87'
CF	15	(Saudi Arabia) Nasser Al-Shamrani
Substitutes:
GK	22	(Saudi Arabia) Fahad Al-Thunayan
DF	4	(Saudi Arabia) Abdullah Al-Zori
MF	6	(Saudi Arabia) Mohammed Al-Qarni
MF	10	(Saudi Arabia) Mohammad Al-Shalhoub	(substituted on) 77'
MF	11	(Saudi Arabia) Abdullaziz Al-Dawsari	(substituted on) 87'
FW	16	(Saudi Arabia) Yousef Al-Salem
FW	20	(Saudi Arabia) Yasser Al-Qahtani	(substituted on) 57'
Manager:
(Romania) Laurențiu Reghecampf

GK	1	(Australia) Ante Covic	(yellow card) 90+1'
RB	2	(Australia) Shannon Cole
CB	35	(Australia) Antony Golec
CB	4	(Australia) Nikolai Topor-Stanley (c)
LB	8	(Croatia) Mateo Poljak
RM	7	(Australia) Labinot Haliti
CM	18	(Italy) Iacopo La Rocca		(substituted off) 77'
CM	17	(Australia) Brendan Hamill
LM	19	(Australia) Mark Bridge
SS	14	(New Zealand) Kwabena Appiah		(substituted off) 49'
CF	11	(Australia) Brendon Santalab		(substituted off) 59'
Substitutes:
GK	20	(Australia) Dean Bouzanis
DF	13	(Australia) Matthew Spiranovic		(substituted on) 77'
DF	23	(Australia) Jason Trifiro
DF	33	(Australia) Daniel Mullen
MF	10	(Brazil) Vítor Saba		(substituted on) 49'
FW	9	(Australia) Tomi Juric		(substituted on) 59'
FW	26	(Australia) Jaushua Sotirio
Manager:
(Australia) Tony Popovic

AFC Man of the Match:
(Australia) Ante Covic (Western Sydney Wanderers)
Fans' Man of the Match:
(Saudi Arabia) Nawaf Al-Abed (Al-Hilal)

Assistant referees:
Toru Sagara (Japan)
Yagi Akane (Japan)
Fourth official:
Ryuji Sato (Japan)

**Match rules**

- 90 minutes.
- The second leg of a two legged, aggregate scored tie.
- The Away goals rule is in force for the 90 minutes of regulation and extra time, if required.
- 30 minutes of extra time if necessary.
- Penalty shoot-out if scores still level.
- Seven named substitutes.
- Maximum of three substitutions.

==== Statistics ====
First half
	Al-Hilal	Western Sydney Wanderers
Goals scored	0	0
Total shots		
Shots on target		
Saves		
Ball possession	69%	31%
Corner kicks	7	0
Fouls committed		
Offsides		
Yellow cards	0	0
Red cards	0	0

Second half
	Al-Hilal	Western Sydney Wanderers
Goals scored	0	0
Total shots		
Shots on target		
Saves		
Ball possession	55%	45%
Corner kicks	6	2
Fouls committed		
Offsides		
Yellow cards	0	1
Red cards	0	0

Overall
	Al-Hilal	Western Sydney Wanderers
Goals scored	0	0
Total shots		
Shots on target		
Saves		
Ball possession	62%	38%
Corner kicks	13	2
Fouls committed		
Offsides		
Yellow cards	0	1
Red cards	0	0

==== Reactions ====
Western Sydney Wanderers coach, Tony Popovic, spoke after the match about the win, saying "we were called a small club yesterday, today we are the biggest in Asia."
