= Abdullah Otayf =

Saudi Arabian footballer (born 1992)

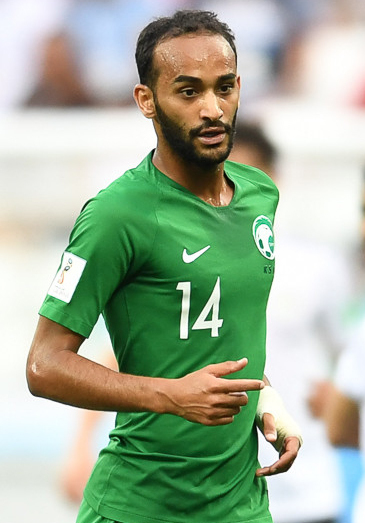
- Otayf with Saudi Arabia at the 2018 FIFA World Cup

Personal information
- Full name: Abdullah Ibrahim Yahya Otayf
- Date of birth: 3 August 1992 (age 34)
- Place of birth: Riyadh, Saudi Arabia
- Height: 1.77 m (5 ft 10 in)
- Position: Midfielder

Youth career
- Al-Shabab

Senior career*
Years	Team	Apps	(Gls)
2011–2012	Al-Shabab	0	(0)
2012–2013	Louletano	8	(0)
2013–2023	Al-Hilal	112	(1)
2023–2025	Al-Ahli	1	(0)

International career^{‡}
2010–2012	Saudi Arabia U20	4	(0)
2012–2015	Saudi Arabia U23	6	(0)
2012–2022	Saudi Arabia	45	(1)
- * Club domestic league appearances and goals as of 22:31, 29 August 2023 (UTC) ‡ National team caps and goals as of 19:22, 22 October 2022 (UTC)

Abdullah Ibrahim Yahya Otayf (Arabic: عَبْد الله إِبْرَاهِيم يَحْيَى عُطَيْف; born 3 August 1992) is a Saudi Arabian footballer who plays as a midfielder.

== Club career ==
Otayf started his career at Al-Shabab before joining Portuguese Second Division side Louletano on 29 August 2012.

On 12 February 2013, Otayf returned to Saudi Arabia and joined Al-Hilal. On 10 April 2018, Otayf renewed his contract with Al-Hilal until the end of the 2020–21 season. On 11 December 2020, Otayf renewed his contract with Al-Hilal once again, signing a two-season extension.

On 8 March 2023, Otayf signed a pre-contract agreement with Al-Ahli. He officially joined the club following the conclusion of the 2022–23 season.

== International career ==
He represented Saudi Arabia in 2011 U20 World Cup. He made his senior debut against Iran on 9 December 2012 in the 2012 WAFF Championship. He scored his first goal against Yemen In that match he celebrated using a Sergio Busquets shirt.

On 23 December 2013, Otayf was named in the squad taking part in the 2013 WAFF Championship.

In May 2018 he was named in Saudi Arabia's preliminary squad for the 2018 FIFA World Cup in Russia. He was also included in the final squad.

Otayf was included in Saudi Arabia's squad for the 2019 AFC Asian Cup in the United Arab Emirates.

On 20 November 2019, Al-Rubaie was named in the squad for the 24th Arabian Gulf Cup. He won the best player award at the tournament.

On 11 November 2022, Otayf was named in the squad for the 2022 FIFA World Cup.

== Career statistics ==
=== Club ===
As of match played 27 May 2024

Club	Season	League			National Cup		League Cup		Continental		Other		Total	
Club	Season	Division	Apps	Goals	Apps	Goals	Apps	Goals	Apps	Goals	Apps	Goals	Apps	Goals
Louletano	2012–13	Segunda Divisão	8	0	0	0	—		—		—		8	0
Al-Hilal	2013–14	SPL	0	0	0	0	0	0	0	0	—		0	0
Al-Hilal	2014–15	SPL	7	0	0	0	2	0	2	0	—		11	0
Al-Hilal	2015–16	SPL	12	0	2	0	1	0	5	0	0	0	20	0
Al-Hilal	2016–17	SPL	12	0	5	0	0	0	10	0	0	0	27	0
Al-Hilal	2017–18	SPL	23	0	1	0	—		5	0	—		29	0
Al-Hilal	2018–19	SPL	17	0	1	0	—		6	0	4 (Note: Three appearances in Arab Club Champions Cup, and one appearance in Saudi-Egyptian Super Cup)	0	28	0
Al-Hilal	2019–20	SPL	8	0	1	0	—		2	0	3 (Note: Appearances in FIFA Club World Cup)	0	14	0
Al-Hilal	2020–21	SPL	17	0	0	0	—		6	0	0	0	23	0
Al-Hilal	2021–22	SPL	6	0	1	0	—		0	0	0	0	7	0
Al-Hilal	2022–23	SPL	10	1	2	0	—		5	0	0	0	17	1
Al-Hilal	Total		112	1	13	0	3	0	41	0	7	0	176	1
Al-Ahli	2023–24	SPL	1	0	0	0	—		—		—		1	0
Career totals			121	1	13	0	3	0	41	0	7	0	185	1

=== International ===
Statistics accurate as of match played 22 October 2022.

Saudi Arabia
Year	Apps	Goals
2012	4	1
2013	2	0
2014	0	0
2015	0	0
2016	0	0
2017	5	0
2018	15	0
2019	11	0
2021	5	0
2022	3	0
Total	45	1

=== International goals ===
#	Date	Venue	Opponent	Score	Result	Competition
1.	12 December 2012	Ali Al-Salem Al-Sabah Stadium, Al Farwaniyah, Kuwait	Yemen	1–0	1–0	2012 WAFF Championship

== Honours ==
Al-Hilal

- Saudi Professional League: 2016–17, 2017–18, 2019–20, 2020–21, 2021–22
- King Cup: 2015, 2017, 2019–20, 2022–23
- Crown Prince Cup: 2015–16
- Saudi Super Cup: 2015, 2018, 2021
- AFC Champions League: 2019, 2021

Individual

- 24th Arabian Gulf Cup MVP
