= Faisal Darwish =

Saudi Arabian footballer

Personal information
- Full name: Faisal Darwish Faraj
- Date of birth: 3 July 1991 (age 35)
- Place of birth: Saudi Arabia
- Height: 1.76 m (5 ft 9 1/2 in)
- Positions: Right back; right midfielder

Youth career
- 2007–2010: Al-Ahli

Senior career*
Years	Team	Apps	(Gls)
2010–2014	Al-Raed	63	(7)
2014–2018	Al-Hilal	31	(3)
2018–2020	Al-Wehda	25	(0)
2020–2023	Al-Taawoun	32	(0)
2023–2024	Ohod		
- * Club domestic league appearances and goals as of 08:12, 1 June 2023 (UTC)

Faisal Darwish (Arabic: فيصل درويش; born 3 July 1991), also spelled Faisel, is a Saudi Arabian footballer who plays as a right-sided midfielder or wing-back.

== Club career ==
On 27 May 2018, Darwish left Al-Hilal after 4 years and signed with newly promoted side Al-Wehda.

On 10 January 2020, Darwish joined Al-Taawoun.

On 10 August 2023, Darwish joined Ohod.

== Honours ==
- Al Hilal:
  - Saudi Professional League (2): 2016–17, 2017–18
  - King Cup (2): 2015, 2017
  - Crown Prince Cup (1): 2015–16
  - Saudi Super Cup (1): 2015
