= Digão (footballer, born 1988) =

Brazilian footballer

Personal information
- Full name: Rodrigo Junior Paula Silva
- Date of birth: 7 May 1988 (age 38)
- Place of birth: Duque de Caxias, Brazil
- Height: 1.87 m (6 ft 1 1/2 in)
- Position: Centre back

Senior career*
Years	Team	Apps	(Gls)
2009–2013	Fluminense	92	(4)
2014–2016	Al-Hilal	45	(1)
2016–2017	Al-Sharjah	26	(1)
2017–2019	Cruzeiro	15	(0)
2018–2019	→ Fluminense (loan)	64	(5)
2020	Fluminense	22	(2)
2020–2022	Buriram United	11	(0)
- * Club domestic league appearances and goals as of 6 May 2022

Rodrigo Junior Paula Silva (born 7 May 1988, in Duque de Caxias), also called Digão, is a Brazilian footballer.

== Club career ==
=== Fluminense ===
Digão played for Fluminense between 2009 and 2013. He made his debut for the club in a draw against Náutico. He started that match and played the whole 90 minutes. In his first season with the club, he featured eight times in league matches but did not score a goal. His first match for the 2010 season was against Ceará. However, Fluminense lost it by a single goal. He played further three times for the club in league, against Atlético Goianiense, Atlético Mineiro and Vitória. He played ten times for the club in the 2011 season, without scoring a goal. During that season, he was ruled out of action for three months for sustaining an injury. On 2 November 2011, he signed a contract extension, keeping him at the club till December 2013.

In the 2012 season, Digão started fourteen matches and played a total of seventeen league matches, scoring two goals. These goals were scored against Figueirense and Grêmio. On the continental level, he played three matches in the Copa Libertadores, which included two matches against Boca Juniors and the third against Arsenal de Sarandi. On 2 June 2013, he scored a brace against Criciúma. In the 2013 season, he played the whole 90 minutes of twelve league matches and also featured four times for the side in Copa Libertadores. On 5 June 2013, he renewed his contract with Fluminense, keeping him at the club till December 2015.

=== Al-Hilal ===
In December 2013, Digão signed for Saudi Arabian club Al-Hilal for £ 6.5 million, joining former Brazilian teammate Thiago Neves. He made his debut against Al Ahli. In his debut season with the Saudi club, he played eight league matches. In the Asian Champions League, he played fourteen times. His team reached the final but lost 1–0 to Australian club Western Sydney Wanderers in the first leg. In the second leg, the clubs drew as the Australian club was crowned winner.

=== Return to Brazil with Cruzeiro ===
In July 2017, Digão was signed by Brazilian giants Cruzeiro, once again joining his former teammate Thiago Neves, who played a part in the negotiations, along with former teammates Dedé and Rafael Sóbis, who were also part of Cruzeiro's squad. Digão signed a three-year deal with the Brazilian team. This marked the defense-man return to the Brazilian Serie A after over four years playing for Middle Eastern clubs.

== Club statistics ==
As of match played on 4 May 2022

Club	Season	League			State League		National Cup		League Cup		Continental		Other		Total	
Club	Season	Division	Apps	Goals	Apps	Goals	Apps	Goals	Apps	Goals	Apps	Goals	Apps	Goals	Apps	Goals
Fluminense	2009	Série A	8	0	2 (Note: Appearances in Campeonato Carioca)	0	0	0	—		5 (Note: Appearances in Copa Sudamericana)	0	—		15	0
Fluminense	2010	Série A	4	0	4	0	3	0	—		—		—		11	0
Fluminense	2011	Série A	10	0	3	0	0	0	—		3 (Note: Appearances in Copa Libertadores)	0	—		16	0
Fluminense	2012	Série A	17	2	8	0	0	0	—		3	0	—		28	2
Fluminense	2013	Série A	12	2	9	0	0	0	—		4	0	—		25	2
Fluminense	Total		51	4	26	0	3	0	—		15	0	—		95	4
Al-Hilal	2013–14	Saudi Pro League	8	0	—		2	0	—		14 (Note: Appearances in AFC Champions League)	0	2 (Note: Appearances in Saudi Champions Cup)	0	26	0
Al-Hilal	2014–15	Saudi Pro League	23	1	—		4	0	—		9	1	4	2	40	4
Al-Hilal	2015–16	Saudi Pro League	14	0	—		2	0	—		5	0	1	0	22	0
Al-Hilal	Total		45	1	—		8	0	—		28	1	7	2	88	4
Sharjah	2016–17	UAE Pro League	19	0	—		3	1	4	0	—		—		26	1
Cruzeiro	2017	Série A	10	0	—		—		—		—		2 (Note: Appearances in Primeira Liga)	0	12	0
Cruzeiro	2018	Série A	0	0	3 (Note: Appearances in Campeonato Mineiro)	0	—		—		—		—		3	0
Cruzeiro	Total		10	0	3	0	—		—		—		2	0	15	0
Fluminense (loan)	2018	Série A	24	1	—		—		—		8	2	—		32	3
Fluminense (loan)	2019	Série A	21	1	5	1	2	0	—		4	0	—		32	2
Fluminense (loan)	Total		45	2	5	1	2	0	—		12	2	—		64	5
Fluminense	2020	Série A	10	2	8	0	2	0	—		2	0	—		32	3
Buriram United	2020–21	Thai League 1	0	0	—		3	0	—		—		—		3	0
Buriram United	2021–22	Thai League 1	11	0	—		0	0	0	0	0	0	—		11	0
Buriram United	Total		11	0	—		3	0	0	0	0	0	—		14	0
Career total			191	9	42	1	21	1	4	0	57	3	9	2	334	20

== Honours ==
=== Club ===
Fluminense

- Taça Guanabara: 2012
- Rio de Janeiro State League: 2012
- Campeonato Brasileiro Série A: 2010, 2012

Al-Hilal

- Kings Cup: 2015
- Saudi Super Cup: 2015
- Saudi Crown Prince Cup: 2015–16

Buriram United

- Thai League 1: 2021–22
- Thai FA Cup: 2021–22
