= Yasser Al-Shahrani =

Saudi Arabian footballer (born 1992)

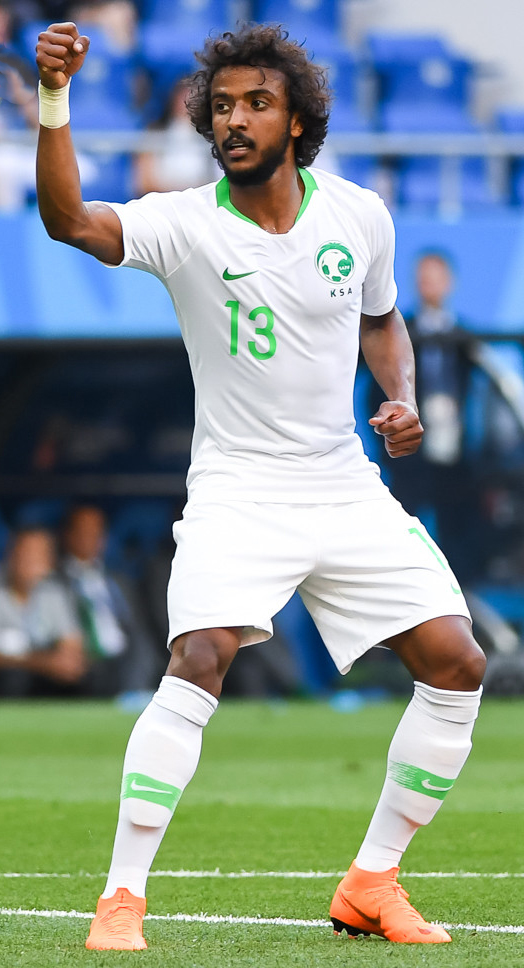
- Yasser Al-Shahrani with Saudi Arabia at the 2018 FIFA World Cup

Personal information
- Full name: Yasser Gharsan Saeed Al-Mohammadi Al-Shahrani
- Date of birth: 25 May 1992 (age 34)
- Place of birth: Dammam, Saudi Arabia
- Height: 1.71 m (5 ft 7 in)
- Position: Left-back

Team information
- Current team: Al-Qadsiah
- Number: 12

Youth career
- 2008–2010: Al-Qadsiah

Senior career*
Years	Team	Apps	(Gls)
2010–2012	Al-Qadsiah	30	(0)
2012–2025	Al-Hilal	266	(9)
2025–	Al-Qadsiah	34	(0)

International career^{‡}
2011–2012	Saudi Arabia U20	4	(1)
2021	Saudi Arabia Olympic (O.P.)	3	(0)
2012–	Saudi Arabia	82	(2)
- * Club domestic league appearances and goals as of 30 October 2026 ‡ National team caps and goals as of 21:13, 22 December 2024 (UTC)

Yasser Gharsan Saeed Al-Mohammadi Al-Shahrani (Arabic: ياسر غرسان سعيد المحمدي الشهراني; born 25 May 1992) is a Saudi Arabian footballer who plays as a left-back for Al-Qadsiah and the Saudi Arabia national team. He moved from Al-Qadsiah to Al-Hilal in 2012, after impressive performances at the 2011 FIFA U-20 World Cup, where he scored against Guatemala. He featured on the official Middle Eastern cover of the game FIFA 16, alongside Lionel Messi.

== Early life ==
Al-Shahrani was born on 25 May 1992 in Dammam, Saudi Arabia in 2008 He Played a Youth Teams of Al-Qadisiyah, in 2012 Al-Shahrani was Joined Al Hilal.

On 28 July 2025, Al-Shahrani joined Al-Qadsiah, thirteen years after leaving the club.

== International career ==
In May 2018, he was named in Saudi Arabia's 23-man final squad for the 2018 FIFA World Cup in Russia.

In November 2022, he was named in Saudi Arabia's 23-man final squad for the 2022 FIFA World Cup in Qatar. He was part of their 2–1 victory over Argentina in the first match, when he collided with his keeper and suffered fractured jaw, facial bones and teeth, and needed rapid surgery due to internal bleeding. Mohammed bin Salman, Crown Prince of the Saudi Arabia instructed that Yasser be transferred by a private jet to Germany for treatment.

== Career statistics ==
=== Club ===
As of match played 31 May 2024

Club	Season	League		King Cup		Crown Prince Cup		Asia		Other		Total	
Club	Season	Apps	Goals	Apps	Goals	Apps	Goals	Apps	Goals	Apps	Goals	Apps	Goals
Al-Qadsiah	2010–11	10	0	—		1	0	—		—		11	0
Al-Qadsiah	2011–12	20	0	—		1	0	—		—		21	0
Al-Qadsiah	Total	30	0	0	0	2	0	0	0	0	0	32	0
Al-Hilal	2012–13	21	1	2	0	4	0	8	0	—		35	1
Al-Hilal	2013–14	25	0	1	0	2	0	7	0	—		35	0
Al-Hilal	2014–15	21	1	4	0	4	0	13	1	—		42	1
Al-Hilal	2015–16	20	1	2	0	2	1	9	0	1 (Note: Appearance at the Saudi Super Cup)	0	34	2
Al-Hilal	2016–17	16	1	2	0	2	0	3	0	0	0	23	1
Al-Hilal	2017–18	20	2	1	0	—		11	1	—		32	3
Al-Hilal	2018–19	21	1	1	0	—		6	0	10 (Note: Eight appearances and one goal at the Arab Club Champions Cup, one appearance at the Saudi Super Cup and one appearance at the Saudi-Egyptian Super Cup)	1	38	2
Al-Hilal	2019–20	25	0	4	0	—		11	0	3 (Note: Three appearances at the FIFA Club World Cup)	0	43	0
Al-Hilal	2020–21	27	1	1	0	—		6	1	1	0	35	2
Al-Hilal	2021–22	23	0	3	0	—		9	0	4 (Note: One appearance and one goal in Saudi Super Cup, and three appearances in FIFA Club World Cup)	1	39	1
Al-Hilal	2022–23	8	0	2	0	—		0	0	—		10	0
Al-Hilal	2023–24	28	1	5	0	—		9	1	8 (Note: Six appearances in Arab Club Champions Cup, and two appearances in Saudi Super Cup)	0	50	2
Al-Hilal	2024–25	11	0	2	0	—		5	0	2	0	20	0
Al-Hilal	Total	266	9	30	0	14	1	97	4	29	2	436	16
Al-Qadsiah	2025–26	0	0	0	0	—		—		0	0	0	0
Career totals		296	9	30	0	16	1	97	4	29	2	468	16

=== International ===
Statistics accurate as of match played 22 December 2024.

Saudi Arabia
Year	Apps	Goals
2012	3	0
2013	4	0
2014	5	0
2015	7	0
2016	3	0
2017	8	0
2018	16	0
2019	11	0
2021	7	2
2022	9	0
2023	4	0
2024	5	0
Total	82	2

Scores and results list Saudi Arabia's goal tally first.

No.	Date	Venue	Opponent	Score	Result	Competition
1.	30 March 2021	King Saud University Stadium, Riyadh, Saudi Arabia	Palestine	1–0	5–0	2022 FIFA World Cup qualification
2.	2 September 2021	King Saud University Stadium, Riyadh, Saudi Arabia	Vietnam	2–1	3–1	2022 FIFA World Cup qualification

== Honours ==
Al-Hilal

- Saudi Professional League: 2016–17, 2017–18, 2019–20, 2020–21, 2021–22, 2023–24
- Kings Cup: 2015, 2017, 2019–20, 2022–23, 2023–24
- Crown Prince Cup: 2012–13, 2015–16
- Saudi Super Cup: 2015, 2018, 2021, 2023, 2024
- AFC Champions League: 2019, 2021
