= Mohammed Jahfali =

Saudi football player

Personal information
- Full name: Mohammed Yahya Jahfali
- Date of birth: October 24, 1990 (age 36)
- Place of birth: Saudi Arabia
- Height: 1.85 m (6 ft 1 in)
- Position: Centre back

Team information
- Current team: Al-Faisaly
- Number: 70

Senior career*
Years	Team	Apps	(Gls)
2010–2015	Al-Faisaly	59	(3)
2015–2024	Al-Hilal	137	(3)
2024–2025	Al-Kholood	14	(0)
2025–	Al-Faisaly	0	(0)

International career^{‡}
2015–2018	Saudi Arabia	2	(0)
- * Club domestic league appearances and goals as of 22:47, 17 May 2024 (UTC) ‡ National team caps and goals as of 22:00, 27 March 2026 (UTC)

Mohammed Yahya Jahfali (Arabic: مُحَمَّد يَحْيَى جَحْفَلِيّ; born on October 24, 1990) is a Saudi Arabian professional footballer who plays as a defender for Saudi First Division League club Al-Faisaly. He was called up to the Saudi Arabia national football team for 2018 FIFA World Cup qualification.

== Club career ==
Jahfali is best known for scoring a last minute equalizing goal against Al-Nassr FC in the 2015 King Cup final match which led them to the penalty shootouts that ended up a victory for his side.

On 12 July 2024, Jahfali joined Saudi Pro League club Al-Kholood.

On 5 August 2025, Jahfali joined Al-Faisaly.

== International career ==
In May 2018 he was named in Saudi Arabia’s preliminary squad for the 2018 World Cup in Russia.

== Career statistics ==
=== Club ===
As of match played 31 May 2024

Club	Season	League		King Cup		Crown Prince Cup		Asia		Other		Total	
Club	Season	Apps	Goals	Apps	Goals	Apps	Goals	Apps	Goals	Apps	Goals	Apps	Goals
Al-Faisaly	2010–11	0	0	—		0	0	—		—		0	0
Al-Faisaly	2011–12	2	0	1	0	0	0	—		—		3	0
Al-Faisaly	2012–13	22	1	—		3	1	—		5 (Note: Appearance in GCC Champions League)	0	30	2
Al-Faisaly	2013–14	23	1	2	0	2	0	—		—		27	1
Al-Faisaly	2014–15	12	1	0	0	1	0	—		—		13	1
Al-Faisaly	Total	59	3	3	0	6	1	0	0	5	0	73	4
Al-Hilal	2014–15	6	0	5	1	0	0	9	0	—		20	1
Al-Hilal	2015–16	20	1	2	1	3	0	5	0	1 (Note: Appearance in Saudi Super Cup)	0	31	2
Al-Hilal	2016–17	15	0	5	1	2	0	9	0	1	0	32	1
Al-Hilal	2017–18	23	2	2	0	—		4	0	—		29	2
Al-Hilal	2018–19	9	0	5	1	—		6	0	4 (Note: Appearances in Arab Club Champions Cup)	0	24	1
Al-Hilal	2019–20	13	0	4	0	—		2	0	0	0	19	0
Al-Hilal	2020–21	15	0	1	0	—		1	0	1	0	18	0
Al-Hilal	2021–22	16	0	3	0	—		9	0	2 (Note: Appearances in FIFA Club World Cup)	0	30	0
Al-Hilal	2022–23	15	0	2	0	—		0	0	1	0	18	0
Al-Hilal	2023–24	5	0	0	0	—		0	0	1	0	6	0
Al-Hilal	Total	137	3	29	4	5	0	45	0	11	0	227	7
Career totals		196	6	32	4	11	1	36	0	16	0	300	11

== Honours ==
Al-Hilal

- Saudi Professional League: 2016–17, 2017–18, 2019–20, 2020–21, 2021–22, 2023–24
- King Cup: 2015, 2017, 2019–20, 2022–23, 2023–24
- Crown Prince Cup: 2015–16
- Saudi Super Cup: 2015, 2018, 2021, 2023
- AFC Champions League: 2019, 2021
