= Mohammed Al-Breik =

Saudi Arabian footballer (born 1992)

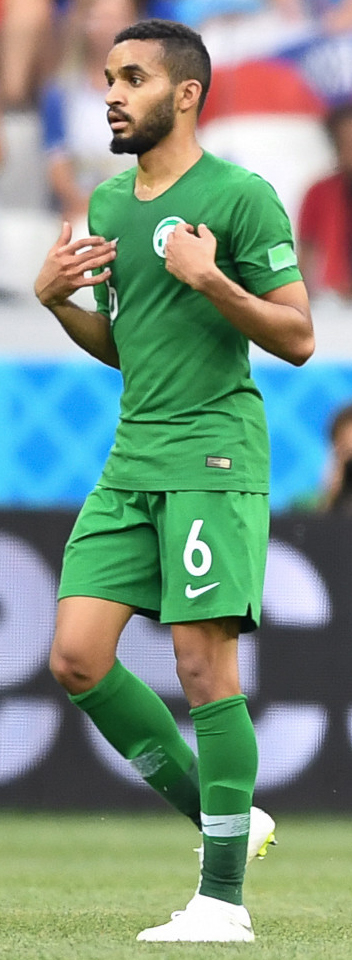
- Al-Breik with Saudi Arabia at the 2018 FIFA World Cup

Personal information
- Full name: Mohammed Ibrahim Mohammed Al-Breik
- Date of birth: 15 September 1992 (age 34)
- Place of birth: Riyadh, Saudi Arabia
- Height: 1.73 m (5 ft 8 in)
- Position: Right-back

Team information
- Current team: Neom
- Number: 2

Youth career
- 2009–2014: Al-Hilal

Senior career*
Years	Team	Apps	(Gls)
2014–2024	Al-Hilal	188	(6)
2015	→ Al-Raed (loan)	13	(0)
2024–	Neom	55	(1)

International career
2015–2024	Saudi Arabia	46	(1)
- * Club domestic league appearances and goals as of 5 November 2026

Mohammed Ibrahim Mohammed Al-Breik (Arabic: محمد إبراهيم محمد البريك; born 15 September 1992) is a Saudi Arabian professional professional footballer who plays as a right-back for Saudi Pro League club Neom.

== Club career ==
Mohammed Al-Breik was at the Al-Hilal youth academy between 2009 until 2014. He was promoted to the first team in 2014 and left on loan in 2015.

=== Al-Raed ===
In 29 January 2015, Al-Breik was loaned to Al-Raed. He helped Al-Raed to survive the League, helping them to 18 points and go out of the relegation zone.

=== Al-Hilal ===
In 20 October 2015, Al-Breik scored his first goal against Al-Ta'awon. After that Al-Breik won the Crown Prince Cup. In the Super Cup 2016 Al-Breik scored his second goal against, but Al-Hilal lost on penalties. He became a regular with Al-Hilal manager Ramón Díaz. In the 2016–17 season, he won his first league and King Cup titles.

=== Neom ===
On 3 September 2024, Al-Breik joined Neom.

== International career ==
On 4 November 2015, he was selected for the Saudi Arabia national team for 2018 FIFA World Cup qualification.

In June 2018, he was named in Saudi Arabia's squad for the 2018 FIFA World Cup in Russia. In November 2022, he received a call-up for the 2022 FIFA World Cup in Qatar.

== Career statistics ==
=== Club ===
As of match played 3 September 2024

Club	Season	League		King Cup		Crown Prince Cup		Asia		Other		Total	
Club	Season	Apps	Goals	Apps	Goals	Apps	Goals	Apps	Goals	Apps	Goals	Apps	Goals
Al-Hilal	2014–15	0	0	0	0	0	0	0	0	—		0	0
Al-Hilal	2015–16	14	2	3	0	1	0	7	0	1 (Note: Appearance(s) in Saudi Super Cup)	0	26	2
Al-Hilal	2016–17	22	1	4	0	2	1	6	0	1	1	35	3
Al-Hilal	2017–18	20	1	0	0	—		11	1	—		31	2
Al-Hilal	2018–19	26	0	0	0	—		5	0	10 (Note: Eight appearances and one goal in Arab Club Champions Cup, one appearance in Saudi Super Cup, one appearance in Saudi-Egyptian Super Cup)	1	41	1
Al-Hilal	2019–20	20	1	4	1	—		6	0	3 (Note: Appearances in FIFA Club World Cup)	0	33	2
Al-Hilal	2020–21	26	0	1	0	—		6	0	1	0	34	0
Al-Hilal	2021–22	13	0	2	0	—		8	0	3 1	0	27	0
Al-Hilal	2022–23	17	0	4	1	—		4	0	—		25	1
Al-Hilal	2023–24	28	1	5	0	—		9	1	5 (Note: Appearances in Arab Club Champions Cup)	0	47	2
Al-Hilal	2024–25	2	0	0	0	—		0	0	0	0	2	0
Al-Hilal	Total	188	6	23	2	3	1	62	2	25	2	301	13
Al-Raed (loan)	2014–15	13	0	1	0	0	0	—		—		14	0
Neom	2024–25	0	0	0	0	0	0	0	0	0	0	0	0
Career totals		201	6	24	2	3	1	59	2	25	2	315	13

=== International ===
Statistics accurate as of match played 26 March 2024.

Saudi Arabia
Year	Apps	Goals
2016	1	0
2017	6	1
2018	11	0
2019	7	0
2020	2	0
2021	5	0
2022	10	0
2024	4	0
Total	46	1

=== International goals ===
Scores and results list Saudi Arabia's goal tally first.

Goal	Date	Venue	Opponent	Score	Result	Competition
1.	7 October 2017	King Abdullah Sports City, Jeddah, Saudi Arabia	Jamaica	4–1	5–2	Friendly

== Honours ==
Al-Hilal

- Saudi Professional League: 2016–17, 2017–18, 2019–20, 2020–21, 2021–22, 2023–24
- King Cup: 2017, 2019–20, 2022–23, 2023–24
- Crown Prince Cup: 2015–16
- Saudi Super Cup: 2015, 2018, 2021, 2023
- AFC Champions League: 2019, 2021

Individual

- IFFHS AFC Man Team of the Year: 2020
- IFFHS AFC Men's Team of the Decade 2011–2020
