= Khalid Kaabi =

Saudi Arabian footballer (born 1992)

Personal information
- Full name: Khalid Hussain Kaabi
- Date of birth: 24 May 1992 (age 34)
- Place of birth: Riyadh, Saudi Arabia
- Height: 1.73 m (5 ft 8 in)
- Position: Winger

Team information
- Current team: Al-Anwar
- Number: 70

Youth career
- 2006–2014: Al-Hilal

Senior career*
Years	Team	Apps	(Gls)
2014–2017	Al-Hilal	22	(2)
2017–2019	Al-Shabab	35	(6)
2019–2022	Al-Faisaly	60	(3)
2022–2025	Al-Fayha	28	(2)
2025–	Al-Anwar	0	(0)

International career
2017–	Saudi Arabia	4	(0)
- * Club domestic league appearances and goals as of 20:45, 24 April 2025 (UTC)

Khalid Kaabi (Arabic: خالد كعبي; born 24 May 1992) is a Saudi Arabian professional footballer who plays as a winger for Al-Anwar.

== Honours ==
Al Hilal

  - King Cup: 2015
  - Crown Prince Cup: 2015–16
  - Saudi Super Cup: 2015

Al-Faisaly

- King Cup: 2020–21
