= Hossam Al-Jadaani =

Saudi Arabian footballer

Personal information
- Full name: Hossam Al-Jadaani
- Date of birth: 28 July 1989 (age 37)
- Place of birth: Saudi Arabia
- Height: 1.82 m (5 ft 11 1/2 in)
- Position: Defender

Team information
- Current team: Al-Rayyan
- Number: 21

Youth career
- Al-Ahli

Senior career*
Years	Team	Apps	(Gls)
2010–2012	Damac		
2012–2013	Al-Taawon	11	(0)
2013–2014	Najran	6	(0)
2014–2017	Al-Khaleej	22	(0)
2017–2018	Al-Nahda		
2018–2020	Al-Sahel		
2020–2021	Al-Ansar		
2021–	Al-Rayyan		
- * Club domestic league appearances and goals

Hossam Al-Jadaani (Arabic: حسام الجدعاني; born 28 June 1989) is a football player who plays for Al-Rayyan as defender.
