= Fawaz Al-Maghati =

Saudi Arabian footballer

Personal information
- Full name: Fawaz Al-Maghati
- Date of birth: March 2, 1987 (age 39)
- Place of birth: Saudi Arabia
- Height: 1.66 m (5 ft 5 in)
- Positions: Left back; midfielder

Youth career
- Al-Ahli

Senior career*
Years	Team	Apps	(Gls)
2006–2010	Al-Ahli		
2008–2010	Najran	6	(0)
2013–2014	Al-Hazem		(1)
2014–2016	Al-Qadsiah	12	(1)
- * Club domestic league appearances and goals

Fawaz Al-Maghati (Arabic: فواز المغاطي, born 2 March 1987) is a Saudi Arabian footballer who plays as a left back and midfielder.
