= Saud Kariri =

Saudi Arabian footballer

Personal information
- Full name: Saud Ali Kariri
- Date of birth: 8 July 1980 (age 46)
- Place of birth: Jizan, Saudi Arabia
- Height: 1.84 m (6 ft 0 in)
- Position: Defensive midfielder

Team information
- Current team: Al Hilal (Director of football)

Youth career
- 1995-2000: Al-Qadsiah

Senior career*
Years	Team	Apps	(Gls)
2000–2003	Al-Qadisiyah	68	(5)
2003–2013	Al-Ittihad	170	(7)
2013–2016	Al-Hilal	47	(2)
2016–2018	Al-Shabab	21	(0)
Total		306	(14)

International career^{‡}
2001–2015	Saudi Arabia	133	(7)
- * Club domestic league appearances and goals as of 18:09, 3 May 2017 (UTC) ‡ National team caps and goals as of 18 January 2015

Saud Ali Kariri (Arabic: سُعُود عَلِيّ كَرِيرِيّ, born 8 July 1980) is a Saudi Arabian former footballer who played as a midfielder, and who previously played with Al Ittihad. He had also previously played for Al-Qadisiyah, the team that introduced most of the Saudi football stars.

He played for the Saudi Arabia national team and was called up to the squad to participate in the 2006 FIFA World Cup. After 14 years, in 2015 he retired from the national team, he has 133 caps.

== Club career ==
=== Al-Hilal ===
On 24 December 2013, Saud transferred from Ittihad to Al-Hilal for 21 Million Saudi Riyals. On 22 June 2015, Saud scored his first goal for Al-Hilal against Al-Faisaly which ended 3-0. He got his first red card against Al-Nassr in the 94th minute. On 21 November 2015, he scored his second goal for Al-Hilal against Al-Khaleej the match ended in a massive win for his team, the score was 7-0. He left in 2016.

=== Al-Shabab ===
On 22 September 2016, Saud went to Al-Shabab. His debut was against Al-Khaleej which ended 2-1.

== International goals ==
Scores and results list Saudi Arabia's goal tally first.

No	Date	Venue	Opponent	Score	Result	Competition
1.	24 December 2002	Al Kuwait Sports Club Stadium, Kuwait City, Kuwait	Syria	2–0	3–0	2002 Arab Nations Cup
2.	25 March 2005	Prince Mohamed bin Fahd Stadium, Dammam, Saudi Arabia	South Korea	1–0	2–0	2006 FIFA World Cup qualification
3.	27 May 2005	King Fahd International Stadium, Riyadh, Saudi Arabia	Bahrain	1–1	1–1	Friendly
4.	11 September 2007	King Fahd International Stadium, Riyadh, Saudi Arabia	Ghana	2–0	5–0	Friendly
5.	18 November 2007	Ismailia Stadium, Ismailia, Egypt	Libya	1–0	1–2	2007 Pan Arab Games
6.	11 August 2010	Prince Abdullah Al Faisal Stadium, Jeddah, Saudi Arabia	Togo	1–0	1–0	Friendly
7.	26 November 2014	King Fahd International Stadium, Riyadh, Saudi Arabia	Qatar	1–0	1–2	22nd Arabian Gulf Cup

== Honours ==
Al-Ittihad

- Saudi Professional League: 2006–07, 2008–09; runner-up 2009–10, 2010–11
- King Cup of Champions: 2010, 2013; runner-up 2008, 2009, 2011
- Saudi Super Cup runner-up: 2013
- AFC Champions League: 2004, 2005; runner-up: 2009
- Crown Prince Cup: 2003–04
- Arab Club Champions Cup: 2004–05

Al-Hilal

- Saudi Professional League runner-up: 2013–14, 2015–16
- King Cup: 2015
- Saudi Super Cup: 2015; runner-up: 2016
- Crown Prince Cup: 2015–16; runner-up: 2013–14, 2014–15
- AFC Champions League runner-up: 2014

Saudi Arabia

- AFC Asian Cup runner-up: 2007
- Arabian Gulf Cup: 2003; runner-up: 2009, 2014
- Arab Nations Cup: 2002

== See also ==
- List of men's footballers with 100 or more international caps
