= Fahad Al-Thunayan =

Saudi Arabian footballer

Personal information
- Full name: Fahad Mohammed Al-Thunayan
- Date of birth: 29 August 1986 (age 40)
- Place of birth: Saudi Arabia
- Height: 1.85 m (6 ft 1 in)
- Position: Goalkeeper

Senior career*
Years	Team	Apps	(Gls)
2007–2014	Al-Taawoun	87	(0)
2014–2019	Al-Hilal	6	(0)
2019–2020	Al-Taqadom		
- * Club domestic league appearances and goals as of 17:00, 5 June 2016 (UTC)

Fahad Mohammed Al-Thunayan (Arabic: فهد محمد الثنيان, born 29 August 1986) is a Saudi footballer who plays as a goalkeeper.
