= Mohammed Al-Qarni =

Saudi Arabian footballer

Personal information
- Full name: Mohammed Salem Al-Qarni
- Date of birth: November 24, 1989 (age 36)
- Place of birth: Saudi Arabia
- Height: 1.74 m (5 ft 8 1/2 in)
- Position: Midfielder

Youth career
- 2008–2010: Al-Hilal

Senior career*
Years	Team	Apps	(Gls)
2008–2017	Al-Hilal	50	(1)
2010	→ Al-Qadsiah	1	(0)
2017–2018	Al-Shabab	6	(0)
2019–2024	Al-Wehda	48	(1)
2021–2022	→ Al-Batin (loan)	26	(0)
2024–2025	Al-Orobah	21	(0)
- * Club domestic league appearances and goals as of 27 June 2022

Mohammed Al-Qarni (Arabic: محمد القرني, born 24 November 1989) is a Saudi Arabian football player who currently plays as a midfielder.

== Honours ==
- Al Hilal:
  - Saudi Professional League (2): 2010, 2011
  - King Cup (1): 2015
  - Crown Prince Cup (5): 2010, 2011, 2012, 2013, 2016
  - Saudi Super Cup (1): 2015
  - AFC Champions League: Runner-up 2014
