= 2015 Saudi Super Cup =

2015 Saudi Super Cup كأس السوبر السعودي 2015
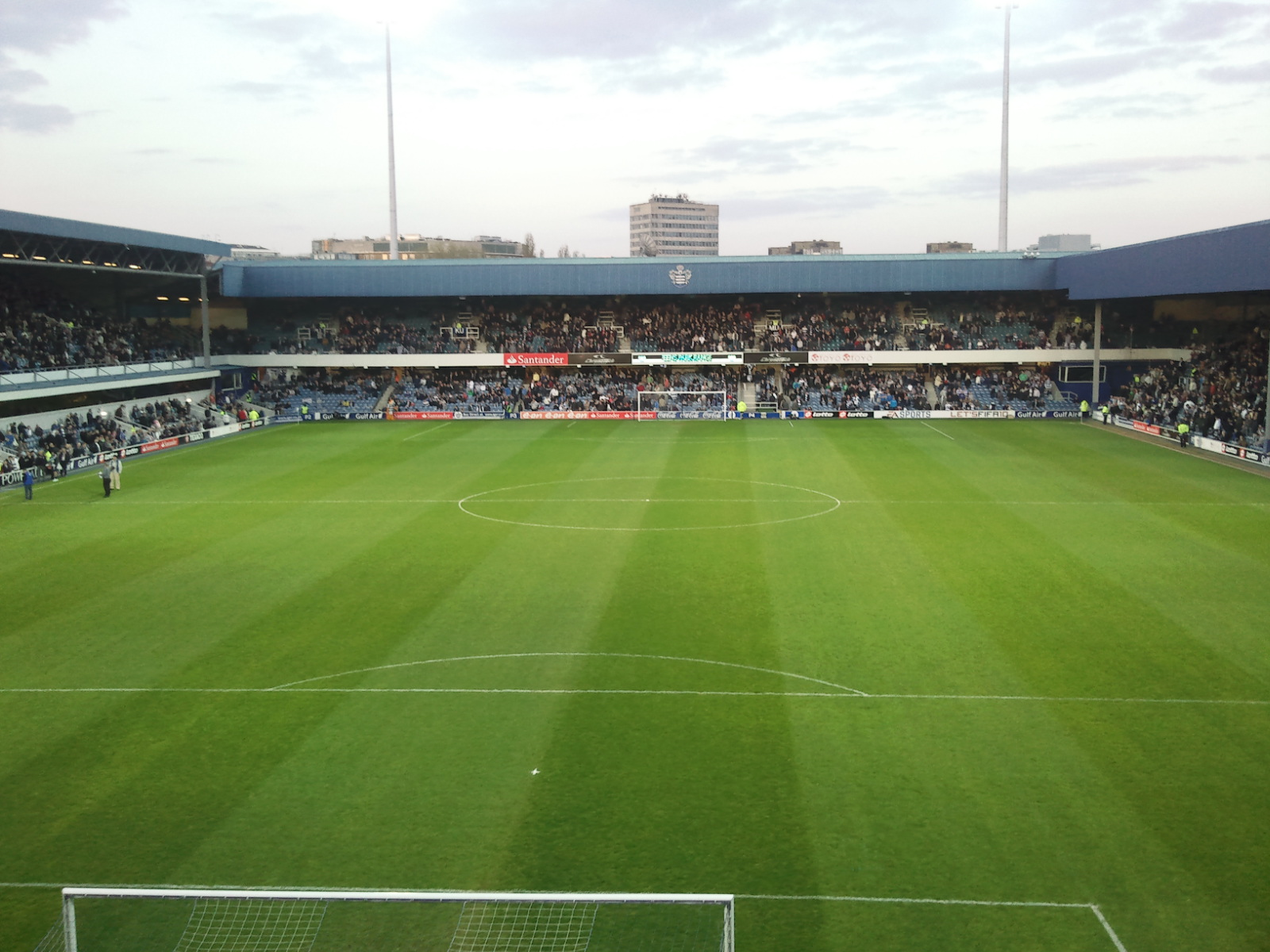
- Loftus Road in london hosted the match
Al-Nassr	Al-Hilal
Pro League	King Cup
0	1
- Date: 12 August 2015
- Venue: Loftus Road, London, England
- Referee: Craig Pawson (England)
- Attendance: 8,439

The 2015 Saudi Super Cup was the third edition of the Saudi Super Cup, an annual football match contested by the winners of the previous season's Saudi Pro League and King Cup competitions.

The match was played on 12 August 2015 between Al-Nassr, the winners of the 2014–15 Saudi Pro League, and Al-Hilal, the winners of the 2015 King Cup.

It was the first edition of the Saudi Super Cup to be held abroad, taking place at the Loftus Road Stadium in London, England. The match was reportedly aimed at engaging Saudi students and expatriates living in the United Kingdom.

Al-Hilal won the match 1–0, with the only goal scored by Carlos Eduardo, to claim their first Saudi Super Cup title.

== Match ==
=== Location and date changes ===
The 2015 Saudi Super Cup was originally scheduled to be played at King Fahd International Stadium, in Riyadh on 14 August 2015, however The SAFF decided to change it to be held at Loftus Road Stadium, in London on 12 August 2015.

=== Details ===
12 August 2015
18:00 BST

Al-Nassr	0–1	Al-Hilal
	Report	Carlos Eduardo 63'

Loftus Road, London
Attendance: 8,439
Referee: Craig Pawson (England)

Al-Nassr	Al-Hilal

GK	32	(Saudi Arabia) Hussain Shae'an
RB	12	(Saudi Arabia) Khalid Al-Ghamdi
CB	4	(Saudi Arabia) Omar Hawsawi
CB	2	(Bahrain) Mohamed Husain (c)	(yellow card) 2'
LB	28	(Saudi Arabia) Ahmad Akash		(substituted off) 81'
CM	26	(Saudi Arabia) Shaya Sharahili
CM	16	(Saudi Arabia) Abdulaziz Al-Jebreen
RM	11	(Uruguay) Fabian Estoyanoff		(substituted off) 58'
AM	8	(Saudi Arabia) Yahya Al-Shehri		(substituted off) 59'
LM	86	(Poland) Adrian Mierzejewski
CF	10	(Saudi Arabia) Mohammed Al Sahlawi
Substitutes:
MF	27	(Saudi Arabia) Awadh Khamis		(substituted on) 59'
FW	9	(Saudi Arabia) Naif Hazazi		(substituted on) 58'
MF	29	(Saudi Arabia) Mosaab Al-Otaibi		(substituted on) 81'
Manager:
(Uruguay) Jorge da Silva

GK	1	(Saudi Arabia) Khalid Sharhili
CB	26	(Brazil) Digão
CB	70	(Saudi Arabia) Mohammed Jahfali
CB	23	(South Korea) Kwak Tae-hwi
RWB	31	(Saudi Arabia) Mohammed Al-Breik	(yellow card) 72'
LWB	12	(Saudi Arabia) Yasser Al-Shahrani
CM	3	(Brazil) Carlos Eduardo		(substituted off) 83'
CM	13	(Saudi Arabia) Salman Al-Faraj
CM	10	(Saudi Arabia) Mohammad Al-Shalhoub (c)		(substituted off) 69'
CF	9	(Brazil) Aílton Almeida
CF	19	(Saudi Arabia) Khalid Ka'abi	(yellow card) 45+1'	(substituted off) 76'
Substitutes:
MF	11	(Saudi Arabia) Abdullaziz Al-Dosari		(substituted on) 69'
MF	25	(Saudi Arabia) Faisel Darwish		(substituted on) 76'
MF	6	(Saudi Arabia) Mohammed Al-Qarni		(substituted on) 83'
Manager:
(Greece) Georgios Donis

=== Statistics ===
Overall
	Al-Nassr	Al-Hilal
Goals scored	0	1
Total shots	11	16
Shots on target	5	8
Ball possession	48%	52%
Corner kicks	5	8
Fouls committed	13	22
Offsides	1	3
Yellow cards	1	2
Red cards	0	0

== See also ==
- 2015–16 Saudi Pro League
- 2015 King Cup
