= 2015 King's Cup (Saudi Arabia) =

2015 King Cup
Tournament details
- Country: Saudi Arabia
- Dates: 23 February – 5 June 2015
- Teams: 32

Final positions
- Champions: Al Hilal
- Runners-up: Al Nassr

Tournament statistics
- Matches played: 31
- Goals scored: 103 (3.32 per match)
- Top goal scorer: Thiago Neves (5 goals)

The 2015 King Cup, or The Custodian of The Two Holy Mosques Cup, was the 40th season of King Cup since its establishment in 1957, and the 8th under the current edition. Al-Shabab was the defending champion but was eliminated by Al Taawon in quarter-finals.

This season's competition featured a total of 32 teams. 14 teams of Pro league, and 16 teams of 1st Division, and 2 teams qualifying from preliminary stage.

The final was held at the King Abdullah Sports City, in Jeddah. Al Hilal won their first title in the current edition and the seventh in total after beating Al Nassr 7–6 on penalties in the final.

== Fixtures and results ==
=== Bracket ===
Round of 32
H	Al Hilal	4
A	Al-Jeel	1
H	Al-Mojzel	0
A	Hajer	3
H	Al Raed	2
A	Al-Safa	0
H	Al-Faisaly (pen.)	0(6)
A	Al-Ansar	0(5)
H	Al-Ittihad	4
A	Al-Riyadh	0
H	Al-Fateh (pen.)	1(4)
A	Al Hazm	1(3)
H	Al-Khaleej	2
A	Al-Qadisiya	3
H	Al-Ahli	3
A	Al Tai	0
H	Al-Shabab	2
A	Al-Diriyah	0
H	Al-Shoalah	1
A	Abha	2
H	Al-Wadi Al-Akhdar	1
A	Al-Ettifaq (aet)	3
H	Al-Feiha	0
A	Al Taawon	3
H	Al-Oruba	3
A	Hetten	0
H	Al-Batin	3
A	Al-Nahda	1
H	Al-Watani	1
A	Najran	2
H	Al-Wahda	1
A	Al Nassr (aet)	2

Round of 16
H	Al Hilal	6
A	Hajer	1
A	Al Raed	1
H	Al-Faisaly	2
A	Al-Ittihad	4
H	Al-Fateh	1
H	Al-Qadisiya (pen.)	1(4)
A	Al-Ahli	1(2)
A	Al-Shabab	2
H	Abha	1
H	Al-Ettifaq	0
A	Al Taawon	2
A	Al-Oruba	1
H	Al-Batin	4
H	Najran	2
A	Al Nassr	4

Quarter-Final
A	Al Hilal	3
H	Al-Faisaly	1
H	Al-Ittihad	2
A	Al-Qadisiya	1
H	Al-Shabab	1
A	Al Taawon	2
A	Al-Batin	0
H	Al Nassr	1

Semi-Final
H	Al Hilal	4
A	Al-Ittihad	1
A	Al Taawon	1
H	Al Nassr	2

Final
–	Al Hilal (pen.)	1 (7)
–	Al Nassr	1 (6)

Note: H: Home team, A: Away team

=== Round of 32 ===
Round of 32 were played on 23 February. 2, 3, 9, 10, & 25 March 2015.

23 February 2015 1	Al-Batin	3–1	Al-Nahda	Hafar al-Batin
15:40 GMT+3	Faisal Al-Zafiri 28', 64'; Khaled Al-Enazi 90+3'		72' (pen.) Abdullah Hojail	Stadium: Department of Education Stadium

23 February 2015 2	Al-Khaleej	2–3	Al-Qadisiya	Al-Khobar
18:20 GMT+3	Hssin Al Tridi 53'; Abdullah Al-Salem 82'		40', 64' Al Najrani; 90+1' Mahmoud Al-Sayegh	Stadium: Prince Abdullah bin Jalawi Stadium

2 March 2015 3	Al-Wadi Al-Akhdar	1–3 (a.e.t.)	Al-Ettifaq	Wadi ad-Dawasir
15:50 GMT+3	80'		53', 111' Mashari Al-Jribai; 106' Saad Khairi	Stadium: Prince Sultan bin Fahad Sports City Stadium

3 March 2015 4	Al-Watani	1–2	Najran	Tabuk
16:20 GMT+3	Aadel Al-Ymani 40'		6' Wesam Waheab Yaqoob; 20' Ibrahim Al Htrsh	Stadium: King Khalid Sport City Stadium

3 March 2015 5	Al-Shoalah	1–2	Abha	Al-Kharj
18:30 GMT+3	Fahad Al-Munaif 70'		5' Abdulelah Hawsawi; 85' Ali Al-Olayani	Stadium: Al-Shoalah Club Stadium

3 March 2015 6	Al-Fateh	1–1 (a.e.t.) (4–3 p)	Al Hazm	Al-Khobar
20:30 GMT+3	Faisal Al-Jamaan 72'		89' William Mensah	Stadium: Prince Abdullah bin Jalawi Stadium

9 March 2015 7	Al-Mojzel	0–3	Hajer	Al Majma'ah
15:45 GMT+3			12' Khaled Al-Ragib; 60', 76' Ahmed Al-Nadhri	Stadium: King Salman Sport City Stadium

9 March 2015 8	Al-Oruba	3–0	Hetten	Al Jawf
16:10 GMT+3	Mashari Al-Enezi 26'; Mohamed Marzouk Alkwykba 40'; Waleed Al-Gizani 47'			Stadium: Al-Oruba Club Stadium

9 March 2015 9	Al Raed	2–0	Al-Safa	Buraidah
18:40 GMT+3	Samer Salem 76'; Fahad Al-Johani 87'			Stadium: King Abdullah Sport City Stadium

9 March 2015 10	Al-Ittihad	4–0	Al-Riyadh	Jeddah
20:40 GMT+3	Marquinho 18'; Mukhtar Fallatah 39' (pen.), 55'; Basem Al-Montashari 72'			Stadium: King Abdullah Sports City

9 March 2015 11	Al-Faisaly	0–0 (a.e.t.) (6–5 p)	Al-Ansar	Al Majma'ah
20:45 GMT+3				Stadium: King Salman Sport City Stadium

10 March 2015 12	Al-Shabab	2–0	Al-Diriyah	Riyadh
18:40 GMT+3	Mousa Al-Shameri 46'; Amer Haroon 50'			Stadium: Prince Faisal bin Fahd Stadium

10 March 2015 13	Al-Feiha	0–3	Al Taawon	Al Majma'ah
18:40 GMT+3			26' Abdulla Al-Shammeri; 67' Ahmed Al-Turki; 81' Abdullah Al Salman	Stadium: King Salman Sport City Stadium

10 March 2015 14	Al Hilal	4–1	Al-Jeel	Riyadh
20:40 GMT+3	Thiago Neves 45+3', 61'; Digão 55'; Georgios Samaras 64'		45+2' Abdulrahim Al-Dabbas	Stadium: King Fahd International Stadium

10 March 2015 15	Al-Wahda	1–2 (a.e.t.)	Al Nassr	Mecca
20:40 GMT+3	Sari Amr 29'		90+1' Armando Wila; 112' (pen.) Fabián Estoyanoff	Stadium: King Abdul Aziz Stadium

25 March 2015 16	Al-Ahli	3–0	Al Tai	Jeddah
20:30 GMT+3	Osvaldo 13', 45+2'; Salman Muwashar 90+1'			Stadium: King Abdullah Sports City

=== Round of 16 ===
Round of 16 were played on 14, 15, 22, 23, & 30 April 2015.

14 April 2015 17	Abha	1–2	Al-Shabab	Abha
16:00 UTC+03:00	Fares Al Hatrsh 90+3'		24' Rafinha; 30' Abdurahman Khairallah	Stadium: Prince Sultan bin Abdul Aziz Stadium

14 April 2015 18	Al-Ettifaq	0–2	Al Taawon	Dammam
18:45 UTC+03:00			52' Jehad Al-Hussain; 72' Ahmed Al-Turki	Stadium: Prince Mohamed bin Fahd Stadium

14 April 2015 19	Al-Qadisiya	1–1 (a.e.t.) (4–2 p)	Al-Ahli	Khobar
18:45 UTC+03:00	Naif Al-Balawi 58' (pen.)		52' Ageel Balghath	Stadium: Prince Saud bin Jalawi Stadium
	Penalties
	Saleh Al-Omrani (penalty scored); Majed Al-Najrani (penalty scored); Abdurahman Al-Obaid (penalty scored); Mohammed Al-Khabrani (penalty scored)		(penalty scored) Bruno César; (penalty scored) Osama Hawsawi; (penalty missed) Mohamed Abdel-Shafy; (penalty missed) M. Bassas

14 April 2015 20	Al Hilal	6–1	Hajer	Riyadh
20:30 UTC+03:00	Thiago Neves 10', 55'; Nasser Al-Shamrani 19' (pen.); Salman Al-Faraj 21'; Salem Al-Dawsari 58'; Nawaf Al Abed 67'		3' Saleh Al-Arfej	Stadium: King Fahd International Stadium

15 April 2015 21	Al-Faisaly	2–1	Al Raed	Al Majma'ah
19:00 UTC+03:00	Mansor Hamzi 15'; Ashraf Nu'man 73'		87' Anas Bani Yaseen	Stadium: King Salman Sport City Stadium

22 April 2015 22	Al-Fateh	1–4	Al-Ittihad	Al-Hasa
18:50 UTC+03:00	Doris Salomo 34'		26' Abdulfattah Asiri; 73' Marquinho; 88', 90+3' Fahad Al-Muwallad	Stadium: Prince Abdullah bin Jalawi Stadium

23 April 2015 23	Al-Batin	4–1	Al-Oruba	Hafar al-Batin
16:00 UTC+03:00	Ali Khirmey 17', 59'; Faisal Al-Zafiri 77'; Jedaan Al-Shemmari 90+2' (pen.)		89' Turki Sofyani	Stadium: Department of Education Stadium

30 April 2015 24	Najran	2–4	Al Nassr	Najran
19:00 UTC+03:00	Ahmed Suhail 21'; Nawaf Al Sabhi 90+2' (pen.)		3' Shaye Ali Sharahili; 30' Abdulaziz Al-Jebreen; 73', 80' Hassan Al-Raheb	Stadium: Al Akhdoud Club Stadium

=== Quarter-finals ===
Quarter-finals were played on 1, 2, & 22 May 2015.

1 May 2015 25	Al-Shabab	1–2	Al Taawon	Riyadh
19:00 UTC+03:00	Abdulmagid Al-Sulaihem 48'		38' Paul Alo'o; 78' Sultan Al-Sawadi	Stadium: King Fahd International Stadium

1 May 2015 26	Al-Faisaly	1–3	Al Hilal	Harmah
21:00 UTC+03:00	Ashraf Nu'man 85' (pen.)		11', 29', 69' Al-Shamrani	Stadium: King Salman Sport City Stadium

2 May 2015 27	Al-Ittihad	2–1	Al-Qadisiya	Jeddah
20:35 UTC+03:00	Mohammed Al-Khabrani 38' (o.g.); Abdurahman Al-Ghamdi 60'		28' Majed Al-Najrani	Stadium: King Abdullah Sports City

22 May 2015 28	Al Nassr	1–0	Al-Batin	Riyadh
20:30 UTC+03:00	Mierzejewski 65'			Stadium: King Fahd International Stadium

=== Semi-finals ===
Semi-finals were played on 30 & 31 May.

30 May 2015 29	Al Nassr	2–1	Al Taawon	Riyadh
20:50 UTC+03:00	Al-Sahlawi 15'; Estoyanoff 73'		77' Nayef Al-Mosa	Stadium: King Fahd International Stadium; Referee: Marai Al-Awaji

31 May 2015 30	Al Hilal	4–1	Al-Ittihad	Riyadh
20:50 UTC+03:00	Digão 26', 76'; Neves 72' (pen.); Kwak 83'		36' (pen.) Al-Muwallad	Stadium: King Fahd International Stadium; Referee: Saleh Al-Hathloul

=== Final ===
5 June 2015
21:00 UTC+3

Al Hilal	1–1 (a.e.t.)	Al Nassr
Jahfali 120+1'		92' Al Sahlawi
Penalties
Al-Shalhoub (penalty scored); Kwak (penalty scored); Al-Salem (penalty scored); Al Abed (penalty scored); Neves (penalty scored); Kariri (penalty scored); Al-Faraj (penalty scored)	7–6	(penalty scored) Adrian; (penalty scored) Al Sahlawi; (penalty scored) Hussein Sulaimani; (penalty scored) Al-Shehri; (penalty scored) Husain; (penalty scored) Eid; (penalty missed) Sharahili

King Abdullah Sports City, Jeddah
Referee: Paolo Mazzoleni (Italy)

== Top scorers ==
Rank	Player	Club	Goals
1	(Brazil) Thiago Neves	Al Hilal	5
2	(Saudi Arabia) Nasser Al-Shamrani	Al Hilal	4
3	(Saudi Arabia) Faisal Al-Zafiri	Al-Batin	3
3	(Saudi Arabia) Fahad Al-Muwallad	Al-Ittihad	3

== See also ==
- Saudi Pro League 2014–15
- Saudi 1st Division League 2014–15
- Saudi Crown Prince Cup 2014–15
- Saudi Super Cup
