= 2008–09 Al-Hilal FC season =

Al Hilal
2008–09 season
- President: (Saudi Arabia) Abdulrahman bin Musa'ad
- Manager: (Romania) Cosmin Olăroiu (until 28 February 2009) (Belgium) Georges Leekens (Until 3 May 2009) (Saudi Arabia) Abdullatif Al Hussaini (until end of season)
- Stadium: King Fahd Stadium; Prince Faisal bin Fahd Stadium
- SPL: 2nd
- Crown Prince Cup: Winners
- King Cup of Champions: Third Place
- AFC Champions League: 2009: Round Of 16^{1}
- Top goalscorer: League: Yasser Al-Qahtani (10); All: Yasser Al-Qahtani (13)

The 2008–09 Al-Hilal FC season was Al-Hilal Saudi Football Club's 52nd in existence and 33rd consecutive season in the top flight of Saudi Arabian football. Along with Pro League, the club participated in the AFC Champions League, Crown Prince Cup, and the King Cup.

== Players ==
=== Squad information ===
Players and squad numbers.
Note: Flags indicate national team as has been defined under FIFA eligibility rules. Players may hold more than one non-FIFA nationality.

No.	Nat.	Position	Name	Date Of Birth (Age)
Goalkeepers
1	(Saudi Arabia)	GK	Mohamed Al-Deayea	2 August 1972 (aged 36)
22	(Saudi Arabia)	GK	Fahad Al-Shamri	5 May 1981 (aged 28)
30	(Saudi Arabia)	GK	Hassan Al-Otaibi	16 October 1977 (aged 31)
Defenders
17	(Saudi Arabia)	RB	Fahed Al-Mofarij	12 April 1978 (aged 31)
19	(Saudi Arabia)	CB	Abdulaziz Khathran	31 July 1973 (aged 36)
4	(Saudi Arabia)	LB / CB	Abdullah Al-Zori	13 August 1987 (aged 21)
25	(Saudi Arabia)	CB	Majed Al Marshadi	1 November 1984 (aged 24)
3	(Saudi Arabia)	CB	Osama Hawsawi	31 March 1984 (aged 25)
24	(Saudi Arabia)	CB	Mohammad Nami	7 January 1982 (aged 27)
23	(Saudi Arabia)	CB	Hassan Khairat	8 March 1986 (aged 23)
Midfielders
8	(Romania)	DM / CM	Mirel Rădoi	22 March 1981 (aged 28)
5	(Saudi Arabia)	CM / AM	Abdulatif Al-Ghanam	16 July 1985 (aged 23)
15	(Saudi Arabia)	RM	Ahmed Al-Fraidi	29 January 1988 (aged 21)
10	(Saudi Arabia)	AM / LW	Mohammad Al-Shalhoub (C)	8 December 1980 (aged 28)
11	(Saudi Arabia)	AM / LM	Abdullaziz Al-Dawsari	11 October 1988 (aged 20)
33	(Saudi Arabia)	DM / CM / LB	Fahad Al Mubarak	15 January 1984 (aged 25)
13	(Saudi Arabia)	CM	Omar Al-Ghamdi	11 April 1979 (aged 30)
29	(Saudi Arabia)	LM / RM	Nawaf Al-Abed	26 January 1990 (aged 19)
6	(Saudi Arabia)	RM	Khaled Aziz	14 July 1981 (aged 27)
14	(Libya)	RM	Tarik El Taib	28 February 1977 (aged 32)
9	(Sweden)	RM	Christian Wilhelmsson	8 December 1979 (aged 29)
Forwards
20	(Saudi Arabia)	ST / CF	Yasser Al-Qahtani	10 October 1982 (aged 26)
18	(Saudi Arabia)	ST / CF	Ahmed Al-Swaileh	14 February 1986 (aged 23)
26	(Saudi Arabia)	RW	Mohammad Al-Anbar	22 March 1985 (aged 24)
7	(South Korea)	ST / CF	Seol Ki-hyeon	8 January 1979 (aged 30)

=== Pro League ===
==== Matches ====
14 September 2008 1	Abha	0–3	Al-Hilal	Abha
22:15 (UTC+03:00)		Report	26' Al-Zori; 28' Al-Mubarak; 89' Al-Qahtani	Stadium: Prince Sultan bin Abdul Aziz Stadium; Referee: Abdullah Al-Qahtani

18 September 2008 2	Al-Hilal	2–0	Al-Raed	Riyadh
22:15 (UTC+03:00)	Al-Fraidi 47'; Al-Swaileh 65'	Report		Stadium: Prince Faisal bin Fahd Stadium; Referee: Metref Al-Qahtani

4 October 2008 3	Najran	2–1	Al-Hilal	Najran
20:00 (UTC+03:00)	Al-Yami 20'; Saleh Dowes 91'	Report	4' (pen.) Al-Shalhoub	Stadium: Al Akhdoud Club Stadium; Referee: Abdullah Al-Qubaisi

8 October 2008 4	Al Watani	1–3	Al-Hilal	Tabuk
20:00 (UTC+03:00)	Kabi 82'	Report	20', 65' Al-Swaileh; 91' (pen.) Al-Shalhoub	Stadium: King Khalid Sport City Stadium; Referee: Mamdouh Al-Mirdasi

12 October 2008 5	Al-Hilal	0–0	Al-Ahli	Riyadh
19:55 (UTC+03:00)		Report		Stadium: King Fahd International Stadium; Referee: Abdulrahman Al-Amri

18 October 2008 6	Al-Hilal	2–1	Al-Nassr	Riyadh
19:55 (UTC+03:00)	Al-Qahtani 18'; Al-Fraidi 38'	Report	91' Élton	Stadium: King Fahd International Stadium; Referee: Paolo Dondarini

22 October 2008 7	Al-Hazm	1–2	Al-Hilal	Ar Rass
19:45 (UTC+03:00)	Robez 3'	Report	27' (pen.) Al-Shalhoub; 59' Al-Qahtani	Stadium: Al Hazm Club Stadium; Referee: Khalil Jalal

4 November 2008 8	Al-Hilal	0–0	Al-Wehda	Riyadh
19:45 (UTC+03:00)		Report		Stadium: King Fahad International Stadium; Referee: Khalil Jalal

22 November 2008 9	Al-Ettifaq	0–2	Al-Hilal	Dammam
19:40 (UTC+03:00)		Report	19' Al-Anbar; 78' (pen.) Wilhelmsson	Stadium: Prince Mohamed bin Fahd Stadium; Referee: Abdelrahman Al-Amri

26 November 2008 10	Al-Hilal	2–0	Al-Shabab	Riyadh
19:40 (UTC+03:00)	Al-Anbar 22', 53'	Report		Stadium: Prince Faisal bin Fahd Stadium; Referee: Abdulrahman Al-Jarwan

30 November 2008 11	Al-Hilal	3–0	Al-Hazm	Riyadh
19:40 (UTC+03:00)	Al-Swaileh 61'; Al-Anbar 66', 71'	Report		Stadium: Prince Faisal bin Fahd Stadium; Referee: Abdullah Al-Qahtani

4 December 2008 12	Al-Ittihad	0–0	Al-Hilal	Jeddah
19:40 (UTC+03:00)		Report		Stadium: Prince Abdullah Al-Faisal Stadium; Referee: Carlo Bertolini

11 December 2008 13	Al-Hilal	4–1	Abha	Riyadh
15:05 (UTC+03:00)	Al-Swaileh 4'; Al-Anbar 22', 38'; Al-Fraidi 65'	Report	45' (pen.) Al Muhamadi	Stadium: Prince Faisal bin Fahd Stadium; Referee: Khalid Al-Zahrani

15 December 2008 14	Al-Raed	0–2	Al-Hilal	Buraidah
19:40 (UTC+03:00)		Report	40' Al-Marshadi; 48' Nami	Stadium: King Abdullah Sport City Stadium; Referee: Abbas Ibrahim

20 December 2008 15	Al-Hilal	7–0	Najran	Riyadh
19:40 (UTC+03:00)	Al-Qahtani 29', 33', 66', 77'; Al-Fraidi 58'; Wilhelmsson 68'; Al-Mubarak 84'	Report		Stadium: Prince Faisal bin Fahd Stadium; Referee: Abdulrahman Al-Jarwan

19 January 2009 16	Al-Hilal	0–0	Al-Watani	Riyadh
20:00 (UTC+03:00)		Report		Stadium: Prince Faisal bin Fahd Stadium; Referee: Mansor Al-Shamari

23 January 2009 17	Al-Nassr	0–2	Al-Hilal	Riyadh
20:00 (UTC+03:00)		Report	71' Al-Qahtani; 79' Radoi	Stadium: King Fahad International Stadium; Referee: Paul Allaerts

28 January 2009 18	Al-Ahli	0–1	Al-Hilal	Jeddah
20:05 (UTC+03:00)		Report	4' Wilhelmsson	Stadium: Prince Abdullah Al-Faisal Stadium; Referee: Brych Felix

5 March 2009 19	Al-Shabab	1–1	Al-Hilal	Riyadh
20:25 (UTC+03:00)	Mouth 93'	Report	95' Al-Qahtani	Stadium: Prince Faisal bin Fahd Stadium; Referee: Brych Felix

23 March 2009 20	Al-Wehda	0–1	Al-Hilal	Makkah
20:25 (UTC+03:00)		Report	89' Al-Anbar	Stadium: King Abdul Aziz Stadium; Referee: Kakos Anastasios

4 April 2009 21	Al-Hilal	2–0	Al-Ettifaq	Riyadh
20:35 (UTC+03:00)	Wilhelmsson 13'; Al-Qahtani 47'	Report		Stadium: Prince Faisal bin Fahd Stadium; Referee: Roberto Rosetti

12 April 2009 22	Al-Hilal	1–2	Al-Ittihad	Riyadh
20:40 (UTC+03:00)	Radoi 51' (pen.)	Report	19' Hazazi; 67' Aboucherouane	Stadium: King Fahad International Stadium; Referee: Michael Koukoulakis

=== Crown Prince Cup ===
15 February 2009 Round of 16	Al-Watani	0–2	Al-Hilal	Tabuk
20:15 (UTC+03:00)		Report	72' Al-Qahtani; 90' Wilhelmsson	Stadium: King Khalid Sport City Stadium

19 February 2009 Quarter-finals	Al-Wehda	0–1	Al-Hilal	Makkah
20:20 (UTC+03:00)		Report	39' Hawsawi	Stadium: King Abdul Aziz Stadium

23 February 2009 Semi-finals	Al-Hilal	1–0	Al-Nassr	Riyadh
20:20 (UTC+03:00)	Wilhelmsson 7'	Report		Stadium: King Fahad International Stadium

27 February 2009 Final	Al-Shabab	0–1	Al-Hilal	Riyadh
20:15 (UTC+03:00)		Report	113' Al-Mofarij	Stadium: King Fahd International Stadium

=== King Cup of Champions ===
==== Quarter-finals ====
17 April 2009 First leg	Al-Nassr	1–1	Al-Hilal	Riyadh
20:40 (UTC+03:00)	Belal 22'		89' Wilhelmsson	Stadium: King Fahd International Stadium

26 April 2009 Second leg	Al Hilal	0–0 (1–1 agg.)	Al-Nassr	Riyadh
20:40 (UTC+03:00)				Stadium: King Fahd International Stadium

==== Semi-finals ====
1 May 2009 First leg	Al-Hilal	0–3	Al-Shabab	Riyadh
20:40 (UTC+03:00)			45' Otaif; 47' Camacho; 62' Al-Saran	Stadium: King Fahd International Stadium

11 May 2009 Second leg	Al-Shabab	1–2 (4–2 agg.)	Al-Hilal	Riyadh
20:45 (UTC+03:00)	Al-Shamrani 50'		71' Seol Ki-hyeon; 72' Wilhelmsson	Stadium: King Fahd International Stadium

==== Third Place ====
14 May 2009 Third Place	Al-Hazm	0–0 (4–5 p)	Al-Hilal	Ar Rass
20:45 (UTC+03:00)				Stadium: Al Hazm Club Stadium
	Penalties
	Roubize (penalty scored); Hamad Ji (penalty missed); Munawer (penalty scored); Al-Mouri (penalty scored); Al-Gizani (penalty scored); Assiri (penalty missed)		(penalty scored) Rădoi; (penalty scored) Al-Swaileh; (penalty scored) Al-Qahtani; (penalty scored) Al Thyab; (penalty missed) Al-Shalhoub; (penalty scored) Seol Ki-hyeon

=== 2009 AFC Champions League ===
11 March 2009 1	Al-Hilal (Saudi Arabia)	1–1	(Iran) Saba Battery	Riyadh, Saudi Arabia
20:40 (UTC+03:00)	Hawsawi 33'	Report	14' Farzaneh	Stadium: King Fahd International Stadium; Attendance: 19,000; Referee: Subkhiddin Mohd Salleh (Malaysia)

17 March 2009 2	Pakhtakor (Uzbekistan)	1–1	(Saudi Arabia) Al-Hilal	Tashkent, Uzbekistan
14:00 (UTC+03:00)	Z. Tadjiyev 57'	Report	55' (pen.) Radoi	Stadium: Pakhtakor Markaziy Stadium; Attendance: 10,454; Referee: Sun Baojie (China)

7 April 2009 3	Al-Hilal (Saudi Arabia)	2–1	(United Arab Emirates) Al-Ahli	Riyadh, Saudi Arabia
20:35 (UTC+03:00)	Al-Qahtani 32'; Radoi 90+3' (pen.)	Report	12' A. Khalil	Stadium: King Fahd International Stadium; Attendance: 11,000; Referee: Mohsen Basma (Syria)

22 April 2009 4	Al-Ahli (United Arab Emirates)	1–3	(Saudi Arabia) Al-Hilal	Dubai, UAE
19:35 (UTC+03:00)	Abd Rabo 3'	Report	32' El Taib; 52' (pen.) Radoi; 64' Al-Qahtani	Stadium: Al-Rashid Stadium; Attendance: 4,500; Referee: Masaaki Toma (Japan)

6 May 2009 5	Saba Battery (Iran)	0–1	(Saudi Arabia) Al-Hilal	Qom, Iran
16:30 (UTC+03:00)		Report	42' El Taib	Stadium: Yadegar Emam Stadium; Attendance: 900; Referee: Tan Hai (China)

20 May 2009 6	Al-Hilal (Saudi Arabia)	2–0	(Uzbekistan) Pakhtakor	Riyadh, Saudi Arabia
20:50 (UTC+03:00)	Al-Anbar 37'; Al-Swaileh 64'	Report		Stadium: King Fahd International Stadium; Attendance: 11,251; Referee: Kim Dong-Jin (Korea Republic)

==== Knockout stage ====
===== Round of 16 =====
26 May 2009 Round Of 16	Al-Hilal (Saudi Arabia)	0–0 (3 – 4 p)	(Qatar) Umm-Salal	Riyadh, Saudi Arabia
20:55 (UTC+03:00)		Report		Stadium: King Fahd International Stadium; Attendance: 17,000; Referee: Hiroyoshi Takayama (Japan)
	Penalties
	Rădoi (penalty scored); Seol (penalty scored); El Taib (penalty missed); Al-Swaileh (penalty scored); Al-Shalhoub (penalty missed)		(penalty missed) Ben Askar; (penalty scored) Al-Noubi; (penalty scored) Magno Alves; (penalty scored) Husain; (penalty scored) Nadiya

== Statistics ==
=== Goalscorers ===
Rank	No.	Pos	Nat	Name	Pro League	King Cup	Crown Prince Cup	2009 ACL	Total
1	20	FW	(Saudi Arabia)	Yasser Al-Qahtani	10	0	1	2	13
2	26	FW	(Saudi Arabia)	Mohammad Al-Anbar	8	0	0	1	9
3	9	MF	(Sweden)	Christian Wilhelmsson	4	2	2	0	8
4	18	FW	(Saudi Arabia)	Ahmed Al-Swaileh	5	0	0	1	6
5	8	MF	(Romania)	Mirel Radoi	2	0	0	3	5
6	15	MF	(Saudi Arabia)	Ahmed Al-Fraidi	4	0	0	0	4
7	10	MF	(Saudi Arabia)	Mohammad Al-Shalhoub	3	0	0	0	3
8	14	MF	(Libya)	Tarik El Taib	0	0	0	2	2
8	33	MF	(Saudi Arabia)	Fahad Al Mubarak	2	0	0	0	2
8	3	DF	(Saudi Arabia)	Osama Hawsawi	0	0	1	1	2
9	4	DF	(Saudi Arabia)	Abdullah Al-Zori	1	0	0	0	1
9	25	DF	(Saudi Arabia)	Majed Al Marshadi	1	0	0	0	1
9	17	DF	(Saudi Arabia)	Fahed Al-Mofarij	0	0	1	0	1
9	24	DF	(Saudi Arabia)	Mohammad Nami	1	0	0	0	1
9	12	FW	(South Korea)	Seol Ki-hyeon	0	1	0	0	1
Total					41	3	5	10	59
