= 2009–10 Al-Hilal FC season =

Al-Hilal
2009–10 season
- President: Abdulrahman bin Musa'ad
- Manager: Eric Gerets
- Stadium: King Fahd Stadium; Prince Faisal bin Fahd Stadium
- SPL: 1st
- Crown Prince Cup: Winners
- King Cup of Champions: Runners-up
- AFC Champions League: 2010: Quarter-finals^{1}
- Top goalscorer: League: Mohammad Al-Shalhoub (12); All: Yasser Al-Qahtani (19)
Home colours	Away colours	Third colours

The 2009–10 Al-Hilal FC season was Al-Hilal Saudi Football Club's 53rd in existence and 34th consecutive season in the top flight of Saudi Arabian football. Along with Pro League, the club participated in the AFC Champions League, Crown Prince Cup, and the King Cup.

== Players ==
=== Squad information ===
Players and squad numbers.
Note: Flags indicate national team as has been defined under FIFA eligibility rules. Players may hold more than one non-FIFA nationality.

No.	Nat.	Position	Name	Date of birth (age)
Goalkeepers
1	(Saudi Arabia)	GK	Mohamed Al-Deayea	2 August 1972 (aged 37)
22	(Saudi Arabia)	GK	Khalid Sharhili	3 February 1987 (aged 23)
30	(Saudi Arabia)	GK	Hassan Al-Otaibi	16 October 1977 (aged 32)
Defenders
12	(South Korea)	RB	Lee Young-pyo	23 April 1977 (aged 33)
21	(Saudi Arabia)	CB	Abdullah Al-Dawsari	24 June 1990 (aged 20)
4	(Saudi Arabia)	LB / CB	Abdullah Al-Zori	13 August 1987 (aged 22)
25	(Saudi Arabia)	CB	Majed Al Marshadi	1 November 1984 (aged 25)
3	(Saudi Arabia)	CB	Osama Hawsawi	31 March 1984 (aged 26)
19	(Saudi Arabia)	CB	Mohammad Nami	7 January 1982 (aged 28)
23	(Saudi Arabia)	CB	Hassan Khairat	8 March 1986 (aged 24)
Midfielders
8	(Romania)	DM / CM	Mirel Rădoi	22 March 1981 (aged 29)
5	(Saudi Arabia)	CM / AM	Abdulatif Al-Ghanam	16 July 1985 (aged 24)
15	(Saudi Arabia)	RM	Ahmed Al-Fraidi	29 January 1988 (aged 22)
10	(Saudi Arabia)	AM / LW	Mohammad Al-Shalhoub	8 December 1980 (aged 29)
11	(Saudi Arabia)	AM / LM	Abdullaziz Al-Dawsari	11 October 1988 (aged 21)
29	(Saudi Arabia)	AM / LM / LW	Salman Al-Faraj (C)	8 January 1989 (aged 21)
13	(Saudi Arabia)	CM	Omar Al-Ghamdi	11 April 1979 (aged 31)
24	(Saudi Arabia)	LM / RM	Nawaf Al-Abed	26 January 1990 (aged 20)
6	(Saudi Arabia)	RM	Khaled Aziz	14 July 1981 (aged 28)
9	(Sweden)	RM	Christian Wilhelmsson	8 December 1979 (aged 30)
7	(Brazil)	RM	Thiago Neves	27 February 1985 (aged 25)
Forwards
20	(Saudi Arabia)	ST / CF	Yasser Al-Qahtani	10 October 1982 (aged 27)
18	(Saudi Arabia)	ST / CF	Ahmed Al-Swaileh	14 February 1986 (aged 24)
26	(Saudi Arabia)	RW	Mohammad Al-Anbar	22 March 1985 (aged 25)
16	(Saudi Arabia)	ST / CF	Essa Al-Mehyani	22 June 1983 (aged 27)

== Competitions ==
=== Overall ===
Competition	Started round	Final position / round	First match	Last match
Pro League	Round 1	Champions	19 August 2009	18 March 2010
Crown Prince Cup	Round of 16	Winners	4 February 2010	19 February 2010
2010 ACL	Group stage	Round of 16^{1}	24 February 2010	12 May 2010
King Cup of Champions	Quarter-finals	Runners-up	4 April 2010	7 May 2010

Notes

- Note 1: Al-Hilal qualified to the quarter-finals.

=== Overview ===
Competition	Record							
Competition	Pld	W	D	L	GF	GA	GD	Win %
Pro League	22	18	2	2	56	18	+38	81.82
King Cup of Champions	5	3	2	0	14	5	+9	60.00
Crown Prince Cup	4	4	0	0	8	4	+4	100.00
2010 ACL	7	4	2	1	14	7	+7	57.14
Total	38	29	6	3	92	34	+58	76.32

Source: Competitions

=== Pro League ===
==== League table ====
Pos	Team	Pld	W	D	L	GF	GA	GD	Pts	Qualification or relegation
1	Al-Hilal (C)	22	18	2	2	56	18	+38	56	AFC Champions League group stage (Note: Al-Shabab secured qualification for the 2011 AFC Champions League due to Al-Ittihad winning the 2010 King Cup of Champions.)
2	Al-Ittihad	22	14	3	5	46	30	+16	45	AFC Champions League group stage
3	Al-Nassr	22	12	7	3	38	23	+15	43	AFC Champions League group stage
4	Al-Shabab	22	11	7	4	36	23	+13	40	AFC Champions League group stage
5	Al-Wehda	22	7	7	8	34	27	+7	28	

Source: slstat.com
Rules for classification: 1) Points; 2) Head-to-head points; 3) Head-to-head goal difference; 4) Total goal difference; 5) Total goals scored; 6) Play-off (only for deciding champion, relegation and AFC competitions participation).
(C) Champions

==== Results summary ====
Overall								Home						Away					
Pld	W	D	L	GF	GA	GD	Pts	W	D	L	GF	GA	GD	W	D	L	GF	GA	GD
22	18	2	2	56	18	+38	56	9	2	0	34	9	+25	9	0	2	22	9	+13

Source: Competitive matches

==== Results by round ====
Round	1	2	3	4	5	6	7	8	9	10	11	12	13	14	15	16	17	18	19	20	21	22
Ground	A	H	A	H	A	H	A	H	A	H	H	H	A	H	A	H	A	H	A	H	A	A
Result	W	W	W	D	W	W	W	W	W	D	W	W	W	W	L	W	W	W	W	W	W	L
Position	2	2	2	2	2	2	1	1	1	1	1	1	1	1	1	1	1	1	1	1	1	1

Source: Competitive matches
A = Away; H = Home; W = Win; D = Draw; L = Loss

==== Matches ====
19 August 2009 1	Al-Qadisiyah	1–2	Al-Hilal	Khobar
20:45 (UTC+03:00)	Nélson 14'	Report	28' Al-Ghanam; 88' Al-Swaileh	Stadium: Prince Saud bin Jalawi Stadium; Referee: Abdulrahman Al-Amri

26 August 2009 2	Al-Hilal	5–0	Najran	Riyadh
22:15 (UTC+03:00)	Wilhelmsson 5', 65'; Al-Mehyani 45'; Al-Shalhoub 53'; Al-Qahtani 82'	Report		Stadium: Prince Faisal bin Fahd Stadium; Referee: Khalid Al-Zahrani

24 September 2009 3	Al-Wehda	1–2	Al-Hilal	Makkah
20:10 (UTC+03:00)	Al-Muwallad 53'	Report	7' Al-Qahtani; 47' Al-Shalhoub	Stadium: King Abdul Aziz Stadium; Referee: Daffer Al-Shehri

29 September 2009 4	Al-Hilal	2–2	Al-Nassr	Riyadh
20:10 (UTC+03:00)	Al-Fraidi 33'; Al-Swaileh 71'	Report	5' (pen.) Al-Sahlawi; 63' Abdulghani	Stadium: King Fahd International Stadium; Referee: Dimitrios Kalapoulos

18 October 2009 5	Al-Ahli	1–2	Al-Hilal	Jeddah
19:50 (UTC+03:00)	Al-Raheb 48'	Report	14' Al-Shalhoub; 30' Wilhelmsson	Stadium: Prince Abdullah Al Faisal Stadium; Referee: Circhetta Claudio

23 October 2009 6	Al-Hilal	5–1	Al-Fateh	Al-Hasa
19:45 (UTC+03:00)	Al-Shalhoub 52' (pen.), 88'; Neves 55'; Al-Qahtani 67'; Wilhelmsson 73'	Report	93' Boabeed	Stadium: Prince Abdullah bin Jalawi Stadium; Referee: Meree Al-Awagi

28 October 2009 7	Al-Raed	0–2	Al-Hilal	Buraidah
19:45 (UTC+03:00)		Report	5' Neves; 88' Al Marshadi	Stadium: King Abdullah Sport City Stadium; Referee: Abdulrahman Al-Amri

2 November 2009 8	Al-Hilal	4–0	Al-Hazm	Riyadh
19:40 (UTC+03:00)	Al-Shalhoub 25', 57' (pen.); Al-Qahtani 39' (pen.); Neves 79'	Report		Stadium: Prince Faisal bin Fahd Stadium; Referee: Fahad Al-Mirdasi

21 November 2009 9	Al-Ettifaq	0–2	Al-Hilal	Dammam
19:35 (UTC+03:00)		Report	22' Al-Qahtani; 52' Wilhelmsson	Stadium: Prince Mohamed bin Fahd Stadium; Referee: Abdelrahman Al-Qahtani

3 December 2009 10	Al-Hilal	2–2	Al-Shabab	Riyadh
19:35 (UTC+03:00)	Neves 25'; Al-Shalhoub 37'	Report	46', 68' Camacho	Stadium: Prince Faisal bin Fahd Stadium; Referee: Victor Kassai

10 December 2009 11	Al-Hilal	5–0	Al-Ittihad	Riyadh
19:35 (UTC+03:00)	Wilhelmsson 7', 84'; Neves 37', 55', 58'	Report		Stadium: Prince Faisal bin Fahd Stadium; Referee: Luc Wouters

15 December 2009 12	Al-Hilal	2–1	Al-Qadisiyah	Riyadh
19:40 (UTC+03:00)	Al-Shalhoub 16'; Al-Mehyani 53'	Report	20' Cominges	Stadium: Prince Faisal bin Fahd Stadium; Referee: Daffer Al-Shehri

20 December 2009 13	Najran	1–2	Al-Hilal	Najran
19:40 (UTC+03:00)	Al-Yami 10'	Report	24' Radoi; 87' Al-Abed	Stadium: Al Akhdoud Club Stadium; Referee: Saad Al-Kathiri

24 December 2009 14	Al-Hilal	3–1	Al-Wehda	Riyadh
15:15 (UTC+03:00)	Al-Qahtani 22'; Al-Shalhoub 63'; Neves 89' (pen.)	Report	77' Assiri	Stadium: Prince Faisal bin Fahd Stadium; Referee: Abdulrahman Al-Amri

31 December 2009 15	Al-Nassr	2–1	Al-Hilal	Riyadh
15:15 (UTC+03:00)	Al-Qarni 8'; Al-Sahlawi 70'	Report	96' (pen.) Al-Shalhoub	Stadium: King Fahd International Stadium; Referee: Kakos Anastasios

7 January 2010 16	Al-Hilal	3–1	Al-Ahli	Riyadh
19:50 (UTC+03:00)	Wilhelmsson 25'; Al-Qahtani 68'; Neves 92'	Report	77' Al-Raheb	Stadium: King Fahad International Stadium; Referee: Sandor Szabo

13 January 2010 17	Al-Fateh	0–4	Al-Hilal	Al-Hasa
19:55 (UTC+03:00)		Report	32', 60' Neves; 68' (pen.) Wilhelmsson; 81' Radoi	Stadium: Prince Abdullah bin Jalawi Stadium; Referee: Jerome Laperriere

19 January 2010 18	Al-Hilal	2–1	Al-Raed	Riyadh
20:00 (UTC+03:00)	Al-Qahtani 45'; Al-Shalhoub 55' (pen.)	Report	88' Al-Shameri	Stadium: Prince Faisal bin Fahd Stadium; Referee: Abdelrahman Al-Qahtani

24 January 2010 19	Al-Hazm	0–2	Al-Hilal	Ar Rass
20:00 (UTC+03:00)		Report	41' Al-Mehyani; 72' Al-Abed	Stadium: Al Hazm Club Stadium; Referee: Vlk Mario

28 January 2010 20	Al-Hilal	1–0	Al-Ettifaq	Riyadh
20:10 (UTC+03:00)	Al-Fraidi 76'	Report		Stadium: King Fahad International Stadium; Referee: Trutz Richard

14 March 2010 21	Al-Shabab	1–2	Al-Hilal	Riyadh
20:30 (UTC+03:00)	Flávio 61'	Report	51' Al-Dawsari; 64' Al-Anbar	Stadium: King Fahad International Stadium; Referee: Abdullah Al-Qahtani

18 March 2010 22	Al-Ittihad	2–1	Al-Hilal	Jeddah
20:30 (UTC+03:00)	Noor 52' (pen.); Ziaya 78'	Report	2' Al-Qahtani	Stadium: Prince Abdullah Al Faisal Stadium; Referee: LOPES Ferreira

=== Crown Prince Cup ===
4 February 2010 Round of 16	Al-Hilal	2–1	Al-Faisaly	Riyadh
20:10 (UTC+03:00)	Wilhelmsson 56'; Balghaith 70' (o.g.)	Report	88' Fallatah	Stadium: Prince Faisal bin Fahd Stadium

10 February 2010 Quarter-finals	Al-Nassr	1–2 (a.e.t.)	Al-Hilal	Riyadh
20:15 (UTC+03:00)	Feindouno 56'	Report	61' Neves; 113' Wilhelmsson	Stadium: King Fahd International Stadium

15 February 2010 Semi-finals	Al-Hilal	2–1	Najran	Riyadh
20:00 (UTC+03:00)	Al-Qahtani 18', 52'	Report	57' Abu-Yabis	Stadium: Prince Faisal bin Fahd Stadium

19 February 2010 Final	Al-Ahli	1–2	Al-Hilal	Riyadh
20:15 (UTC+03:00)	Simões 43'	Report	66' Wilhelmsson; 78' Neves	Stadium: King Fahd International Stadium; Referee: Massimo Busacca (Switzerland)

=== King Cup of Champions ===
==== Quarter-finals ====
4 April 2010 First leg	Al-Hilal	3–1	Al-Fateh	Riyadh
20:35 (UTC+03:00)	Al-Shalhoub 26' (pen.); Khairat 28'; Al-Mehyani 69'		82' Al-Hderme	Stadium: Prince Faisal bin Fahd Stadium

8 April 2010 Second leg	Al-Fateh	0–5 (1–8 agg.)	Al Hilal	Al-Hasa
20:35 (UTC+03:00)			11' Al-Abed; 44', 61' (pen.) Al-Qahtani; 64' Al-Shalhoub; 72' Al-Mehyani	Stadium: Prince Abdullah bin Jalawi Stadium

==== Semi-finals ====
20 April 2010 First leg	Al-Nassr	3–5	Al-Hilal	Riyadh
21:00 (UTC+03:00)	Figueroa 62', 86' (pen.); Belal 79'		8', 27' Al-Qahtani; 25' (pen.), 90' Rădoi; 59' Nami	Stadium: King Fahd International Stadium

2 May 2010 Second leg	Al-Hilal	1–1 (6–4 agg.)	Al-Nassr	Riyadh
20:50 (UTC+03:00)	Neves 29'		57' Al-Harthi	Stadium: King Fahd International Stadium

==== Final ====
7 May 2010 Final	Al-Hilal	0–0 (a.e.t.) (4–5 p)	Al-Ittihad	Riyadh
21:00 (UTC+03:00)				Stadium: King Fahd International Stadium; Referee: Manuel Mejuto González (Spain)
	Penalties
	Al-Qahtani (penalty scored); Al-Mehyani (penalty scored); Lee Young-pyo (penalty scored); Wilhelmsson (penalty scored); Al-Fraidi (penalty missed)		(penalty scored) Kariri; (penalty scored) Ziaya; (penalty scored) Chermiti; (penalty scored) Al-Raheeb; (penalty scored) Noor

=== 2010 AFC Champions League ===
==== Group stage ====
Pos	Team	Pld	W	D	L	GF	GA	GD	Pts	Qualification	HIL	MES	SAD	AHL
1	(Saudi Arabia) Al-Hilal	6	3	2	1	11	7	+4	11	knock-out stage	—	3–1	0–0	1–1
2	(Iran) Mes Kerman	6	3	0	3	13	13	0	9	knock-out stage	3–1	—	3–1	4–2
3	(Qatar) Al-Sadd	6	2	2	2	12	9	+3	8		0–3	4–1	—	2–2
4	(United Arab Emirates) Al-Ahli	6	1	2	3	9	16	−7	5		2–3	2–1	0–5	—

Source: Soccerway

24 February 2010 1	Al-Sadd (Qatar)	0–3	(Saudi Arabia) Al-Hilal	Doha, Qatar
17:55 (UTC+03:00)			9', 66' Al-Qahtani; 90+3' Neves	Stadium: Jassim Bin Hamad Stadium; Attendance: 11,100; Referee: Ravshan Irmatov (Uzbekistan)

10 March 2010 2	Al-Hilal (Saudi Arabia)	3–1	(Iran) Mes Kerman	Riyadh, Saudi Arabia
20:25 (UTC+03:00)	Wilhelmsson 3'; Hawsawi 15'; Al-Qahtani 81'		90+3' Samereh	Stadium: King Fahd International Stadium; Attendance: 22,000; Referee: Tan Hai (China)

24 March 2010 3	Al-Hilal (Saudi Arabia)	1–1	(United Arab Emirates) Al-Ahli	Riyadh, Saudi Arabia
20:30 (UTC+03:00)	Al-Mehyani 48'		90+1' Abd Rabo	Stadium: King Fahd International Stadium; Attendance: 12,000; Referee: Nawaf Shukralla (Bahrain)

30 March 2010 4	Al-Ahli (United Arab Emirates)	2–3	(Saudi Arabia) Al-Hilal	Dubai, UAE
18:25 (UTC+03:00)	A. Khalil 43'; César 65'		10' Al-Qahtani; 15' Wilhelmsson; 90+2' Lee Young-Pyo	Stadium: Al-Rashid Stadium; Attendance: 4,000; Referee: Yuichi Nishimura (Japan)

13 April 2010 5	Al-Hilal (Saudi Arabia)	0–0	(Qatar) Al-Sadd	Riyadh, Saudi Arabia
20:35 (UTC+03:00)				Stadium: King Fahd International Stadium; Attendance: 17,000; Referee: Abdullah Al-Hilali (Oman)

27 April 2010 6	Mes Kerman (Iran)	3–1	(Saudi Arabia) Al-Hilal	Kerman, Iran
16:30 (UTC+03:00)	Edinho 1'; Zaltron 76'; Rajabzadeh 90+2'		51' Al-Mehyani	Stadium: Shahid Bahonar Stadium; Attendance: 11,100; Referee: Masaaki Toma (Japan)

==== Knockout stage ====
===== Round of 16 =====
12 May 2010 Round of 16	Al-Hilal (Saudi Arabia)	3–0	(Uzbekistan) Bunyodkor	Riyadh, Saudi Arabia
20:45 (UTC+03:00)	Al-Marshedi 9'; Wilhelmsson 57'; Neves 61'			Stadium: King Fahd International Stadium; Attendance: 52,129; Referee: Ben Williams (Australia)

== Statistics ==
=== Goalscorers ===
Rank	No.	Pos	Nat	Name	Pro League	King Cup	Crown Prince Cup	2010 ACL	Total
1	20	FW	(Saudi Arabia)	Yasser Al-Qahtani	9	4	2	4	19
2	7	MF	(Brazil)	Thiago Neves	11	1	2	2	16
3	9	MF	(Sweden)	Christian Wilhelmsson	9	0	3	3	15
4	10	MF	(Saudi Arabia)	Mohammad Al-Shalhoub	12	2	0	0	14
5	16	FW	(Saudi Arabia)	Essa Al-Mehyani	3	2	0	2	7
6	8	MF	(Romania)	Mirel Radoi	2	2	0	0	4
7	24	MF	(Saudi Arabia)	Nawaf Al-Abed	2	1	0	0	3
8	15	MF	(Saudi Arabia)	Ahmed Al-Fraidi	2	0	0	0	2
8	18	FW	(Saudi Arabia)	Ahmed Al-Swaileh	2	0	0	0	2
8	25	DF	(Saudi Arabia)	Majed Al Marshadi	1	0	0	1	2
9	11	DF	(Saudi Arabia)	Abdullaziz Al-Dawsari	1	0	0	0	1
9	26	FW	(Saudi Arabia)	Mohammad Al-Anbar	1	0	0	0	1
9	23	DF	(Saudi Arabia)	Hassan Khairat	0	1	0	0	1
9	19	DF	(Saudi Arabia)	Mohammad Nami	0	1	0	0	1
9	5	MF	(Saudi Arabia)	Abdulatif Al-Ghanam	1	0	0	0	1
9	3	DF	(Saudi Arabia)	Osama Hawsawi	0	0	0	1	1
9	12	DF	(South Korea)	Lee Young-pyo	0	0	0	1	1
Total					56	14	7	14	90

=== Assists ===
Rank	No.	Pos	Nat	Name	League	King Cup	Crown Prince Cup	2010 CL	Total
1	9	MF	(Sweden)	Christian Wilhelmsson	10	1	1	3	15
2	7	MF	(Brazil)	Thiago Neves	7	1	1	5	14
3	10	MF	(Saudi Arabia)	Mohammad Al-Shalhoub	5	0	0	1	6
4	4	DF	(Saudi Arabia)	Abdullah Al-Zori	4	0	0	0	4
4	8	MF	(Romania)	Mirel Rădoi	0	2	0	2	4
5	20	FW	(Saudi Arabia)	Yasser Al-Qahtani	2	0	1	0	3
5	11	MF	(Saudi Arabia)	Abdullaziz Al-Dawsari	2	1	0	0	3
5	16	FW	(Saudi Arabia)	Essa Al-Mehyani	2	0	1	0	3
5	24	MF	(Saudi Arabia)	Nawaf Al-Abed	1	1	1	0	3
6	13	MF	(Saudi Arabia)	Omar Al-Ghamdi	1	0	1	0	2
6	12	DF	(South Korea)	Lee Young-pyo	2	0	0	0	2
6	15	MF	(Saudi Arabia)	Ahmed Al-Fraidi	0	1	0	1	2
7	19	DF	(Saudi Arabia)	Mohammad Nami	1	0	0	0	1
7	3	DF	(Saudi Arabia)	Osama Hawsawi	1	0	0	0	1
7	25	DF	(Saudi Arabia)	Majed Al Marshadi	1	0	0	0	1
Total					39	7	6	12	64
