= 2013–14 Saudi Crown Prince Cup =

2013–14 Crown Prince Cup
Tournament details
- Country: Saudi Arabia
- Dates: 25 November 2013 – 1 February 2014
- Teams: 30

Final positions
- Champions: Al-Nassr (3rd title)
- Runners-up: Al-Hilal

Tournament statistics
- Matches played: 29
- Goals scored: 96 (3.31 per match)
- Top goal scorer(s): Doris Fuakumputu (4 goals)
- All statistics correct as of 1 February 2014.

The 2013–14 Saudi Crown Prince Cup was the 39th season of the Saudi Crown Prince Cup since its establishment in 1957. This season's competition featured a total of 30 teams, 14 teams from the Pro League, and 16 teams from the First Division. For the first time, the Crown Prince Cup tournament was contested by 30 teams, having been expanded from the 16-team format used since 1991. Under the new format, last season's finalists received a bye to the Round of 16 while the remaining 28 teams entered at the preliminary stage.

Al-Hilal were the six-time defending champions, but lost in the final against Al-Nassr, who won their third Crown Prince Cup title and first since 1974.

== Format changes ==
On 1 June 2013, the Saudi Arabian Football Federation announced changes in the format of the cup competitions in Saudi Arabia. As per the new regulations, the number of teams in the King Cup was increased from 8 teams to 32 teams. In addition, the competition was open to all 153 Saudi teams, 30 teams from the Pro League and First Division would qualify directly to the Round of 32, and 2 teams would qualify from the qualifying stages. The Saudi FF also announced changes to the format of the Crown Prince Cup. These changes included an increase in the number of teams. The competition was open to all professional clubs in the top 2 tiers of Saudi football (the Pro League and the First Division). Under this new format, the finalists from the previous season will receive a bye to the Round of 16 while the remaining 28 teams enter at the preliminary round.

== First stage ==
=== Preliminary round ===
The Preliminary round fixtures were played on 25 November and 2 & 3 December 2013. All times are local, AST (UTC+3).

25 November 2013 6	Al-Qadsiah (2)	4–2	Hajer (2)	Khobar
15:00	Othman 7'; Assiri 22' (pen.), 37'; Al-Ghwinem 47'	Report	Al-Rejaib 31', 75' (pen.)	Stadium: Prince Saud bin Jalawi Stadium; Referee: Badr Al-Enezi

25 November 2013 10	Al-Kawkab (2)	0–2	Al-Wehda (2)	Al-Kharj
15:15		Report	Abdulghani 11'; Al-Muwallad 46'	Stadium: Al-Shoulla Club Stadium; Referee: Khaled Al-Sennani

2 December 2013 1	Al-Jeel (2)	3–4	Najran (1)	Al-Hasa
15:00	Al-Ghawas 5' (pen.); Al-Khamis 28'; Al-Shehab 80'	Report	Al-Robeai 26' (pen.); Al-Hatrash 37'; Al-Najrani 46'; Jandson 78'	Stadium: Prince Abdullah bin Jalawi Stadium; Referee: Khaled Salwi

2 December 2013 3	Al-Khaleej (2)	2–2 (a.e.t.) (4–3 p)	Al-Nahda (1)	Saihat
15:00	Al-Harbi 39'; Al-Garni 112'	Report	Haqawi 45+3'; Abo Shararah 92'	Stadium: Al-Khaleej Club Stadium; Referee: Mishari Al-Mishari
	Penalties
	Al-Motawaa (penalty scored); Al-Mahrous (penalty missed); Al-Turki (penalty scored); Al-Aboud (penalty missed); Al-Abbas (penalty scored); Al-Garni (penalty scored)		(penalty scored) Al-Dhahi; (penalty scored) F. Al-Dossari; (penalty missed) Al-Najei; (penalty scored) Al-Hamdan; (penalty missed) E. Al-Dossari; (penalty missed) A. Al-Dossari

2 December 2013 13	Al-Orobah (1)	1–0	Ohod (2)	Sakakah
15:30	Al-Shanqiti 62'	Report		Stadium: Al-Orobah Club Stadium; Referee: Feihan Al-Sahali

2 December 2013 4	Al-Ansar (2)	0–3	Al-Faisaly (1)	Medina
15:40		Report	Al-Saran 29'; Belal 64'; Salem 85' (pen.)	Stadium: Prince Mohammed bin Abdul Aziz Stadium; Referee: Khaled Al-Terais

2 December 2013 7	Al-Shabab (1)	3–1	Al-Batin (2)	Riyadh
19:40	Al-Mehyani 19'; Assiri 31'; Menegazzo 51' (pen.)	Report	Jadoua 77'	Stadium: Prince Faisal bin Fahd Stadium; Referee: Abdulrahman Al-Ahmari

3 December 2013 8	Al-Shoulla (1)	3–2	Al-Riyadh (2)	Al-Kharj
15:10	Al-Mobarak 39'; Al-Mouri 45'; Fané 79'	Report	K. Al-Dossari 41', 70' (pen.)	Stadium: Al-Shoulla Club Stadium; Referee: Abdulrahman Al-Sultan

3 December 2013 9	Al-Raed (1)	2–0	Hetten (2)	Buraidah
15:15	Al-Hadhri 62', 82'	Report		Stadium: King Abdullah Sport City Stadium; Referee: Khaled Al-Sannali

3 December 2013 11	Al-Tai (2)	2–3	Al-Fateh (1)	Ha'il
15:30	Al-Matar 15'; Al-Juhaim 38'	Report	Sufyani 25'; Al-Mogahwi 86'; Fuakumputu 90+2'	Stadium: Prince Abdul Aziz bin Musa'ed Stadium; Referee: Mohammed Al-Nuhait

3 December 2013 14	Abha (2)	0–1 (a.e.t.)	Al-Ahli (1)	Abha
15:40		Report	Al-Jassim 115' (pen.)	Stadium: Prince Sultan bin Abdul Aziz Stadium; Referee: Hussain Al-Satri

3 December 2013 12	Al-Watani (2)	0–2	Al-Ettifaq (1)	Tabuk
15:45		Report	Seraj 85'; Kanno 90+1'	Stadium: King Khalid Sport City Stadium; Referee: Mohammed Al-Qarni

3 December 2013 2	Al-Ittihad (1)	3–1	Al-Hazem (2)	Mecca
19:40	Al-Ghamdi 6'; F. Al-Muwallad 27'; O. Al-Muwallad 36' (pen.)	Report	Al-Moqaadi 16'	Stadium: King Abdul Aziz Stadium; Attendance: 1,060; Referee: Abdulrahman Al-Shehri

3 December 2013 5	Al-Diriyah (2)	0–2	Al-Taawoun (1)	Riyadh
19:40		Report	Al-Harthi 62'; Al-Turki 72'	Stadium: Prince Faisal bin Fahd Stadium; Referee: Abdulrahman Al-Kaabi

== Second stage ==
=== Bracket ===
Round of 16
H	Al-Nassr	3
A	Najran	0
H	Al-Ittihad	2 (3)
A	Al-Khaleej (pen.)	2 (4)
A	Al-Faisaly	2
H	Al-Taawoun	3
H	Al-Qadsiah	1
A	Al-Shabab	2
H	Al-Hilal	4
A	Al-Shoulla	1
H	Al-Raed	1
A	Al-Wehda	0
H	Al-Fateh	3
A	Al-Ettifaq	2
A	Al-Orobah	1
H	Al-Ahli	4

Quarter-finals
A	Al-Nassr	3
H	Al-Khaleej	1
A	Al-Taawoun	1
H	Al-Shabab	3
A	Al-Hilal	1
H	Al-Raed	0
A	Al-Fateh	2
H	Al-Ahli	0

Semi-finals
H	Al-Nassr (a.e.t.)	1
A	Al-Shabab	0
A	Al-Hilal	2
H	Al-Fateh	0

Final
–	Al-Nassr	2
–	Al-Hilal	1

Note: H: Home team, A: Away team

=== Round of 16 ===
The Round of 16 fixtures were played on 10 & 16 December 2013. The Al-Raed v Al-Wehda match was postponed due to flight conditions. All times are local, AST (UTC+3).

10 December 2013 15	Al-Nassr (1)	3–0	Najran (1)	Riyadh
15:10	Élton 10'; Everton 26'; Al-Zylaeei 74'	Report		Stadium: Prince Faisal bin Fahd Stadium; Referee: Khalil Al Ghamdi

10 December 2013 17	Al-Taawoun (1)	3–2	Al-Faisaly (1)	Buraidah
15:20	Reche 35'; Al-Meshauqeh 48', 57'	Report	Hamzi 76'; Belal 78' (pen.)	Stadium: King Abdullah Sport City Stadium; Referee: Mohammed Al-Hoaish

10 December 2013 16	Al-Ittihad (1)	2–2 (a.e.t.) (3–4 p)	Al-Khaleej (2)	Mecca
19:40	Al-Muwallad 18'; Fallatah 62'	Report	Al-Zowayed 23'; Al-Sheikh 74'	Stadium: King Abdul Aziz Stadium; Attendance: 1,241; Referee: Khaled Salwi
	Penalties
	Kariri (penalty missed); Fallatah (penalty missed); Al-Raheeb (penalty scored); Bonfim (penalty scored); Al-Muwallad (penalty scored)		(penalty scored) Al-Motawaa; (penalty missed) Al-Turki; (penalty scored) Al-Traidi; (penalty scored) Al-Sheikh; (penalty scored) Al Abbas

10 December 2013 18	Al-Qadsiah (2)	1–2	Al-Shabab (1)	Khobar
19:40	Othman 82'	Report	Al-Mehyani 44' (pen.); Al-Dawsari 60'	Stadium: Prince Saud bin Jalawi Stadium; Attendance: 370; Referee: Turki Al-Khudhayr

10 December 2013 21	Al-Fateh (1)	3–2	Al-Ettifaq (1)	Al-Hasa
19:40	Fuakumputu 4', 80'; Sufyani 22'	Report	Al-Hamed 65', 88'	Stadium: Prince Abdullah bin Jalawi Stadium; Referee: Abdulrahman Al-Amri

10 December 2013 22	Al-Ahli (1)	4–1	Al-Orobah (1)	Jeddah
19:40	Bassas 3', 6'; Al-Fatil 15'; Aman 55'	Report	Edoa 13'	Stadium: Prince Mohammed bin Abdullah Al Faisal Stadium; Attendance: 3,403; Referee: Fahad Al-Mirdasi

10 December 2013 19	Al-Hilal (1)	4–1	Al-Shoulla (1)	Riyadh
20:00	S. Al-Dawsari 17'; Al-Qahtani 26', 66'; Al-Deayea 60'	Report	Kondo 35'	Stadium: Prince Faisal bin Fahd Stadium; Referee: Marai Al Awaji

16 December 2013 20	Al-Raed (1)	1–0	Al-Wehda (2)	Buraidah
15:20	Al-Hadhri 74' (pen.)	Report		Stadium: King Abdullah Sport City Stadium; Referee: Abdulrahman Al-Shehri

=== Quarter-finals ===
The Quarter-finals fixtures were played on 23 & 24 December 2013. All times are local, AST (UTC+3).

23 December 2013 25	Al-Raed (1)	0–1	Al-Hilal (1)	Buraidah
15:20		Report	S. Al-Dawsari 41'	Stadium: King Abdullah Sport City Stadium; Referee: Shukri Al-Hanfoush

23 December 2013 26	Al-Ahli (1)	0–2	Al-Fateh (1)	Jeddah
19:40		Report	Élton 82'; Fuakumputu 90+4'	Stadium: Prince Mohammed bin Abdullah Al Faisal Stadium; Attendance: 4,200; Referee: Fahad Al-Mirdasi

24 December 2013 24	Al-Shabab (1)	3–1	Al-Taawoun (1)	Riyadh
15:10	Muath 31'; Sharahili 45' (o.g.); Al-Ruwaili 59'	Report	Al-Meshauqeh 16'	Stadium: Prince Faisal bin Fahd Stadium; Referee: Fahad Al-Oraini

24 December 2013 23	Al-Khaleej (2)	1–3	Al-Nassr (1)	Dammam
17:35	Bashir 3'	Report	Élton 6'; Al-Shehri 54'; Jaizawi 90+3'	Stadium: Prince Mohamed bin Fahd Stadium; Attendance: 12,000; Referee: Mohammed Al-Qarni

=== Semi-finals ===
The Semi-finals fixtures were played on 21 January 2014. All times are local, AST (UTC+3).

21 January 2014 28	Al-Fateh (1)	0–2	Al-Hilal (1)	Al-Hasa
15:25		Report	Neves 65' (pen.); Al-Shamrani 87'	Stadium: Prince Abdullah bin Jalawi Stadium; Attendance: 9,168; Referee: Fahad Al-Oraini

21 January 2014 27	Al-Nassr (1)	1–0 (a.e.t.)	Al-Shabab (1)	Riyadh
20:00	Al-Raheb 102'	Report		Stadium: King Fahd International Stadium; Attendance: 16,625; Referee: Turki Al-Khudhayr

=== Final ===
The final was held on 1 February 2014 in the King Fahd International Stadium in Riyadh. All times are local, AST (UTC+3).

1 February 2014
20:15

Al-Nassr	2–1	Al-Hilal
Al-Deayea 24' (o.g.); Al-Sahlawi 59' (pen.)	Report	Al-Shamrani 2'

King Fahd International Stadium, Riyadh
Attendance: 62,124
Referee: Damir Skomina (Slovenia)

== Top goalscorers ==
As of 1 February 2014

Rank	Player	Club	Goals
1	(Democratic Republic of the Congo) Doris Fuakumputu	Al-Fateh	4
2	(Oman) Hussain Al-Hadhri	Al-Raed	3
2	(Saudi Arabia) Thamer Al-Meshauqeh	Al-Taawoun	3
