= 2007–08 Al-Nassr FC season =

Saudi Arabian football club season

The 2007–08 season was Al-Nassr's 32nd consecutive season in the top flight of Saudi football and 52nd year in existence as a football club

== League ==
=== Results ===
2007-08-24

Al-Shabab	1 – 1	Al-Nassr
Juan Manuel Martínez 52'		Issam Merdassi 14'

Faisal bin Fahd Stadium, Riyadh
2007-09-14

Al-Watani	1 – 0	Al-Nassr
Fahad Abu Jaber 13'

Khalid bin Abdul Aziz Stadium, Tabuk
2007-09-20

Al-Nassr	1 – 5	Al-Ittihad
Saad Al-Harthi 51'		Mohammed Noor 14' 53'; Alhassane Keita 81' 91'; Osama Al-Muwallad 88'

King Fahd Stadium, Riyadh
2007-09-25

Al-Nassr	1 – 1	Al-Tai
Mohammed Al-shahrani 82'		Faisal Al-Idresi 11' (pen.)

Faisal bin Fahd Stadium, Riyadh
2007-09-30

Al-Ahli	0 – 3	Al-Nassr
		Ahmed Al-Mobarak 38'; Awad AL-otabi 57'; Élton José 79'

Abdullah al-Faisal Stadium, Jeddah
2007-10-18

Al-Nassr	1 – 0	Al-Wehda
Issam Merdassi 18' (pen.)

Faisal bin Fahd Stadium, Riyadh
2007-10-25

Al-Nassr	2 – 1	Najran
Saad Al-Harthi 50'; Mohammed Al-shahrani 71'		Al Hasan Al-Yami 19' (pen.)

Faisal bin Fahd Stadium, Riyadh
2007-11-06

Al-Nassr	1 – 3	Al-Hilal
Saad Al-Harthi 17'		Abdulaziz Khathran 12'; Abdullah Al-Zori 16'; Fahed Al-Mofarij 39'

Faisal bin Fahd Stadium, Riyadh
2007-12-01

Al-Ettifaq	1 – 4	Al-Nassr
Saleh Bashir 20'		Élton José 22' 46'; Mohammed Al-shahrani 33'; Issam Merdassi 59'

Mohamed bin Fahd Stadium, Dammam
2007-12-05

Al-Nassr	2 – 2	Al-Shabab
Saad Al-Harthi 32' (pen.); Mohammed Al-shahrani 66'		Naser AlShamrani 30'; Naji Majrashi 83'

Faisal bin Fahd Stadium, Riyadh
2007-12-10

Al-Qadsiah	0 – 2	Al-Nassr
		Mohammed Al-shahrani 55'; Saad Al-Harthi 80'

Saud bin Jalawi Stadium, Khobar
2007-12-14

Al-Hilal	1 – 1	Al-Nassr
Mohammad Nami 19'		Saad Al-Harthi 41'

Faisal bin Fahd Stadium, Riyadh
27-12-2007

Al-Nassr	2 – 1	Al-Watani
Abdelkarim Nafti 3'; Issam Merdassi 71' (pen.)		Osman Traori 29'

Faisal bin Fahd Stadium, Riyadh
2008-01-03

Al-Ittihad	4 – 0	Al-Nassr
Magno Alves 5' 33' 78' 82'

Abdullah al-Faisal Stadium, Jeddah
2008-01-12

Al-Tai	1 – 3	Al-Nassr
Abdullah Al-Onazi 92'		Mohammed Al-shahrani 6' 81'; Saad Al-Harthi 75'

AbdulAziz bin Musa'ed Stadium, Ha'il
2008-01-24

Al-Nassr	2 – 1	Al-Ahli
Mohammed Al-shahrani 45' (pen.); Saad Al-Harthi 50' (pen.)		Malek Mouath 74'

King Fahd Stadium, Riyadh
2008-02-22

Al-Wehda	1 – 1	Al-Nassr
Essa Al-Mehyani 59'		Abdelkarim Nafti 49'

King Abdul Aziz Stadium, Mecca
2008-03-13

Najran	5 – 4	Al-Nassr
Al Hasan Al-Yami 3' (pen.) 30' (pen.) 49' 71'; Wilson Antonio 86'		Mohammed Al-shahrani 42' 43'; Mohsen Al-Garni 69'; Saad Al-Harthi 79'

Najran Stadium, Najran
2008-03-30

Al-Nassr	0 – 1	Al-Qadsiah
		Mohamed Al-Sahlawi 25'

King Fahd Stadium, Riyadh
2008-04-04

Al-Nassr	2 – 1	Al-Hazem
Ahmed Al-Mobarak 63'; Saad Al-Harthi 89' (pen.)		Theyab Majrashi 7'

Faisal bin Fahd Stadium, Riyadh
2008-04-09

Al-Hazem	1 – 1	Al-Nassr
Safwan Al-Mowalad 52' (pen.)		Abdelkarim Nafti 9'

Al-Hazm Stadium, Ar Rass
2008-04-13

Al-Nassr	0 – 3	Al-Ettifaq
		Seaaf Al-Bushi 34'; Prince Tagoe 68'; Abraheem Al-Magnem 90'

King Fahd Stadium, Riyadh

=== Al-Nassr Standing in 2007-2008 League ===
Team	Pts	Pld	W	D	L	GF	GA	GD	Position
Al-Nassr	33	22	9	6	7	34	35	-1	5th

== King Cup ==
=== Quarter-final ===
Team 1	Agg.	Team 2	1st leg	2nd leg
Al-Nassr	3-3	Al-Hazem	2-3	1-0

Al-Hazem won on penalties shootout.

==== First leg ====
2008-04-19

Al-Nassr	2–3	Al-Hazem
Mohsen Al-Garni 46'; Saad Al-Harthi 83' (pen.)		Safwan Al-Mowalad 24'; Fahad Al-Rashedi 27'; Sabir Hussain 89'

Faisal bin Fahd Stadium, Riyadh

==== Second leg ====
2008-04-25

Al-Hazem	0–1	Al-Nassr
		Mohsen Al-Garni 80'
Penalties
Saud Al-Kaibari (penalty scored) Fahad Al-Rashidi (penalty scored); Ahmed Monawer (penalty scored); Abdullah Ghazi (penalty scored); Thiab Majrashi (penalty scored) Yahia Majrashi (penalty scored)	6 – 5	(penalty scored) Saad Al-Harthi (penalty scored) Mohammed Al-shahrani; (penalty scored) Élton José; (penalty scored) Hamad Al-Sagoor; (penalty scored) Issam Merdassi (penalty missed) Ahmed Al-Mobarak

Al-Hazm Stadium, Ar Rass

== Crown Prince Cup ==
=== Round of 16 ===
2008-08-08

Al-Hilal	2 – 0	Al-Nassr
Tarik El Taib 24' (pen.); Yasser Al-Qahtani 80'

King Fahd Stadium, Riyadh

== Federation Cup ==
=== Group stage ===
2007-12-30

Al-Wehda	1 – 3	Al-Nassr
Sharaf Al-Harthi 51' (pen.)		Mohammed Al-Hosainan 36'; Dhaya haroon 57'; Awad AL-otabi 61'

King Abdul Aziz Stadium, Mecca
2008-01-09

Al-Nassr	4 – 1	Al-Ittihad
Ryan Belal 1'; Abdulrahman Al-Bishi 37' (pen.) 46'; Élton José 47'		Talal Al-Meshal 47'

King Fahd Stadium, Riyadh
2008-01-15

Al-Ahli	2 – 2	Al-Nassr
Mishal Al-Mutairi 3' (o.g.); Ibrahim Hazzazi 46'		Élton José 45'; Ryan Belal 57'

Abdullah al-Faisal Stadium, Jeddah
2008-01-22

Al-Watani	1 – 1	Al-Nassr
Tahya Kabi 51'		Awad AL-otabi 24'

Khalid bin Abdul Aziz Stadium, Tabuk
2008-02-07

Al-Nassr	3 – 1	Al-Tai
Mohsen Al-Garni 6'; Khairi AlDoseri 24'; Tala Al-Zubaidi 90'		Mansor Al-Somaihan 48'

Faisal bin Fahd Stadium, Riyadh
2008-02-16

Al-Nassr	2 – 2	Al-Wehda
Ibraheam Shraheali 50'; Mohsen Al-Garni 87'		Ahmed Al-Mousa 19'; Essa Al-Mehyani 28'

Faisal bin Fahd Stadium, Riyadh
2008-02-24

Al-Ittihad	2 – 3	Al-Nassr
Obaid Al-Shamrani 65'; Talal Al-Meshal 87'		Ryan Belal 16' 51' 86'

Abdullah al-Faisal Stadium, Jeddah
2008-03-04

Al-Nassr	0 – 2	Al-Ahli
		Abdoh Baker Bernaoy 10' (o.g.); Motaz Al-Mousa 21'

King Fahd Stadium, Riyadh
2008-03-09

Al-Nassr	4 – 0	Al-Watani
Mohsen Al-Garni 21'; Majed Hazazi 28'; Hamad Al-Sagoor 42'; Mohammed Al-shahrani 67' (pen.)

Faisal bin Fahd Stadium, Riyadh
2008-03-16

Al-Tai	1 – 1	Al-Nassr
Hamad Al-Juhaim 85'		Mohammed Al-Hosainan 42'

AbdulAziz bin Musa'ed Stadium, Ha'il

=== Group standing ===
Team	Pts	Pld	W	D	L	GF	GA	GD
1. Al-Ahli	22	10	7	1	2	21	8	+13
2. Al-Nassr	19	10	5	4	1	23	13	+10
3. Al-Wehda	13	10	4	1	5	18	19	-1
4. Al-Ittihad	13	10	4	1	5	19	21	-2
5. Al-Watani	13	10	4	1	5	12	20	-8
6. Al-Tai	5	10	1	2	7	6	18	-12

=== Semi-final ===
2008-03-22

Al-Shabab	2 – 2 (aet) (4 – 5 pen.)	Al-Nassr
Ali Otaif 13'; Saleh Sadeeq 19'		Ryan Belal 4'; Mohammed Al-shahrani 83'
Penalties
Ali Otaif (penalty scored) Hussain Moaz (penalty scored); Ahmed Otaif (penalty scored); Marcelo Camacho (penalty scored) Saleh Sadeeq (penalty missed)	4 – 5	(penalty scored) Mohammed Al-shahrani (penalty scored) Abdoh Baker Bernaoy; (penalty scored) Élton José; (penalty scored) Ibraheam Shraheali (penalty scored) Ahmad Al-Bahri

Faisal bin Fahd Stadium, Riyadh
Attendance: 20,000
Referee: Mutrif Al-Qahtani

=== Final ===
2008-04-02

Al-Nassr	2 – 1	Al-Hilal
Élton José 48' (pen.); Ryan Belal 68'		Abdullaziz Al-Dosari 56'

King Fahd Stadium, Riyadh
Attendance: 65,000
Referee: Massimo Busacca, Switzerland

== Under 20 Team ==
=== Results ===
2007-11-01

Al-Fateh	1 – 1	Al-Nasr

Al-Fateh, Al-Hasa
2007-11-08

Al-Nassr	0 – 1	Al-Ahli

Al-Nassr, Riyadh
2007-11-15

Al-Ettifaq	1 – 0	Al-Nassr

Al-Ettifaq, Dammam
2007-11-23

Al-Nassr	0 – 3	Al-Ittihad

Al-Nassr, Riyadh
2007-11-29

Al-Nassr	1 – 1	Hottain

Al-Nassr, Riyadh
2007-12-06

Al-Qadsiah	1 – 3	Al-Nassr

Al-Qadsiah, Khobar
2007-12-13

Al-Nassr	2 – 1	Al-Wehda

Al-Nassr, Riyadh
2007-12-28

Al-Hilal	3 – 1	Al-Nassr

Al-Hilal, Riyadh
2008-01-04

Al-Shabab	0 – 1	Al-Nassr

Al-Shabab, Riyadh
2008-01-10

Al-Nassr	0 – 2	Al-Tai

Al-Nassr, Riyadh
2008-01-17

Al-Ansar	0 – 1	Al-Naasr

Al-Ansar, Medina
2008-02-14

Al-Nassr	3 – 0	Al-Fateh

Al-Naasr, Riyadh
2008-02-22

Al-Ahli	0 – 0	Al-Nassr

Al-Ahli, Jeddah
2008-02-29

Al-Ettifaq	1 – 1	Al-Nassr

Al-Ettifaq, Dammam
2008-03-06

Al-Ittihad	2 – 2	Al-Nassr

Al-Ittihad, Jeddah
2008-03-13

Hottain	3 – 1	Al-Nassr

Hottain, Jizan
2008-03-20

Al-Nassr	0 – 2	Al-Qadsiah

Al-Nassr, Riyadh
2008-03-28

Al-Wehda	2 – 2	Al-Nassr

Al-Wehda, Mecca
2008-04-04

Al-Nassr	2 – 3	Al-Hilal

Al-Nassr, Riyadh
2008-04-11

Al-Nassr	1 – 2	Al-Shabab

Al-Nassr, Riyadh

=== Al-Nasr Standing ===
Team	Pts	Pld	W	D	L	GF	GA	GD	Position
Al-Nasr	21	20	5	6	9	22	29	-7	9th

Last Updated 2008-04-28

== Under 17 Team ==
=== Results ===
2007-11-09

Al-Nasr	4 – 1	Al-Wahda

Al-Nasr, Riyadh
2007-11-15

Al-Hilal	1 – 1	Al-Nasr

Al-Hilal, Riyadh
2007-11-22

Al-Ittifaq	1 – 0	Al-Nasr

Al-Ittifaq, Dammam
2007-11-29

Al-Shabab	0 – 2	Al-Nasr

Al-Shabab, Riyadh
2007-12-06

Al-Nasr	3 – 0	Al-Sholah

Al-Nasr, Riyadh
2007-12-12

Al-Ansar	0 – 1	Al-Nasr

Al-Ansar, Medina
2007-12-28

Al-Nasr	0 – 1	Al-Ahli

Al-Nasr, Riyadh
2008-01-03

Al-Nasr	1 – 1	Al-Fath

Al-Nasr, Riyadh
2008-01-10

Hottain	0 – 2	Al-Nasr

Hottain, Jizan
2008-01-18

Al-Nasr	2 – 1	Al-Ittihad

Al-Nasr, Riyadh
2008-02-15

Al-Wahda	1 – 4	Al-Nasr

Al-Wahda, Mecca
2008-02-21

Beesh	0 – 3	Al-Nasr

Beesh, Jizan
2008-02-27

Al-Nasr	0 – 0	Al-Hilal

Al-Nasr, Riyadh
2008-03-07

Al-Ittifaq	0 – 1	Al-Nasr

Al-Ittifaq, Dammam
2008-03-13

Al-Nasr	1 – 0	Al-Shabab

Al-Nasr, Riyadh
2008-03-21

Al-Sholah	0 – 4	Al-Nasr

Al-Sholah, Al Kharj
2008-03-27

Al-Nasr	1 – 0	Al-Ansar

Al-Nasr, Riyadh
2008-04-03

Al-Ahli	1 – 1	Al-Nasr

Al-Ahli, Jeddah
2008-04-10

Al-Fath	0 – 2	Al-Nasr

Al-Fath, Al-Hasa
2008-04-24

Al-Nasr	2 – 1	Hottain

Al-Nasr, Riyadh

=== Al-Nasr Standing ===
Team	Pts	Pld	W	D	L	GF	GA	GD	Position
Al-Nasr	46	20	14	4	2	35	9	+26	2nd

Last Updated 2008-04-28
