= 2009 King Cup of Champions =

Tournament details
- Country: Saudi Arabia
- Dates: 17 April – 15 May 2009
- Teams: 8

Final positions
- Champions: Al-Shabab (2nd title)
- Runners-up: Al-Ittihad

Tournament statistics
- Matches played: 14
- Goals scored: 33 (2.36 per match)
- Top goal scorer(s): Nasser Al-Shamrani; Waleed Al-Gizani (3 goals each)

The 2009 King Cup of Champions, or The Custodian of the Two Holy Mosques Cup, was the 34th season of King Cup of Champions since its establishment in 1957, and the 2nd under the current edition.

Al-Shabab won their second title in a row after beating the same team they faced in last season's final Al-Ittihad with a 4–0 victory in the final match. Al-Shabab also earned entry into the 2010 AFC Champions League group stage.

== Participating teams ==
Team	Qualifying method	App*	Last App
Al-Ittihad	2008–09 Professional League champions	2nd	2008
Al-Hilal	2008–09 Professional League runners-up	2nd	2008
Al-Shabab	2008–09 Saudi Federation Cup Champions; 2008–09 Professional League 4th place	2nd	2008
Al-Ahli	2008–09 Professional League 3rd place	2nd	2008
Al-Nassr	2008–09 Professional League 5th place	2nd	2008
Al-Ettifaq	2008–09 Professional League 6th place	2nd	2008
Al-Wehda	2008–09 Professional League 7th place	2nd	2008
Al-Hazm	2008–09 Professional League 8th place	2nd	2008

* Number of appearance in King Cup of Champions since the 2008 season.

== Fixtures and results ==
=== Bracket ===
Quarter-finals
5	Al-Nassr	1	0	1
2	Al-Hilal (a)	1	0	1
7	Al-Wehda	2	1	3
4	Al-Shabab	5	2	7
6	Al-Ettifaq	0	0	0
1	Al-Ittihad	1	1	2
8	Al-Hazm (a)	1	2	3
3	Al-Ahli	1	2	3

Semi-finals
2	Al-Hilal	0	2	2
4	Al-Shabab	3	1	4
1	Al-Ittihad	2	1	3
8	Al-Hazm	0	0	0

Final
4	Al-Shabab	4
1	Al-Ittihad	0
Third place
8	Al-Hazm	0 (4)
2	Al-Hilal (p)	0 (5)

=== Quarter-finals ===
Quarter-finals were played between 17 and 26 April 2009.

==== First leg ====
17 April 2009 1	Al-Nassr	1–1	Al-Hilal	Riyadh
20:40 (UTC+3)	Belal 22'		Wilhelmsson 89'	Stadium: King Fahd International Stadium

17 April 2009 2	Al-Ettifaq	0–1	Al-Ittihad	Dammam
20:40 (UTC+3)			Al-Meshal 89'	Stadium: Prince Mohamed bin Fahd Stadium

17 April 2009 3	Al-Wehda	2–5	Al-Shabab	Makkah
20:40 (UTC+3)	Al-Mor 75'; Akrout 83'		Camacho 26'; Al-Shamrani 35'; Otaif 36'; Al-Bloushi 38'; Al-Muwallad 48'	Stadium: King Abdul Aziz Stadium

18 April 2009 4	Al-Hazm	1–1	Al-Ahli	Ar Rass
20:40 (UTC+3)	Al-Gizani 90+4' (pen.)		Saïbi 47'	Stadium: Al Hazm Club Stadium

==== Second leg ====
24 April 2009 5	Al-Ahli	2–2	Al-Hazm	Jeddah
20:45 (UTC+3)	Al-Raheb 28'; Massad 39'		Al-Gizani 34', 60'	Stadium: Prince Abdullah Al Faisal Stadium

25 April 2009 6	Al-Shabab	2–1	Al-Wehda	Riyadh
20:40 (UTC+3)	Al-Salem 18', 41'		Al-Mousa 87'	Stadium: Prince Faisal bin Fahd Stadium

26 April 2009 7	Al-Hilal	0–0	Al-Nassr	Riyadh
20:40 (UTC+3)				Stadium: King Fahd International Stadium

26 April 2009 8	Al-Ittihad	1–0	Al-Ettifaq	Jeddah
20:40 (UTC+3)	Al-Muwallad 2'			Stadium: Prince Abdullah Al Faisal Stadium

=== Semi-finals ===
Semi-finals were played on 1 & 11 May 2009.

==== First leg ====
1 May 2009 9	Al-Ittihad	2–0	Al-Hazm	Jeddah
20:40 (UTC+3)	Aboucherouane 13'; Hazazi 87'			Stadium: Prince Abdullah Al Faisal Stadium

1 May 2009 10	Al-Hilal	0–3	Al-Shabab	Riyadh
20:40 (UTC+3)			Otaif 45'; Camacho 47'; Al-Saran 62'	Stadium: King Fahd International Stadium

==== Second leg ====
11 May 2009 11	Al-Hazm	0–1	Al-Ittihad	Ar Rass
20:45 (UTC+3)	Hazazi 84'			Stadium: Al Hazm Club Stadium

11 May 2009 12	Al-Shabab	1–2	Al-Hilal	Riyadh
20:45 (UTC+3)	Al-Shamrani 50'		Seol Ki-hyeon 71'; Wilhelmsson 72'	Stadium: King Fahd International Stadium

=== Third Place ===
Third place game was played on 14 May 2009.

14 May 2009 13	Al-Hazm	0–0 (a.e.t.) (4–5 p)	Al-Hilal	Ar Rass
20:45 (UTC+3)				Stadium: Al Hazm Club Stadium
	Penalties
	Roubize (penalty scored); Hamad Ji (penalty missed); Munawer (penalty scored); Al-Mouri (penalty scored); Al-Gizani (penalty scored); Assiri (penalty missed)		(penalty scored) Rădoi; (penalty scored) Al-Swaileh; (penalty scored) Al-Qahtani; (penalty scored) Al Thyab; (penalty missed) Al-Shalhoub; (penalty scored) Seol Ki-hyeon

=== Final ===
15 May 2009
20:45 UTC+3

Al-Shabab	4–0	Al-Ittihad
Al-Saqri 10' (o.g.); Al-Shamrani 20'; Muath 71'; Al-Sultan 90+1'

King Fahd International Stadium, Riyadh
Referee: Kyros Vassaras (Greece)

==== Winner ====
King Cup of Champions
2009 Winners
Al-Shabab
2nd title
