= 2010 King Cup of Champions =

Tournament details
- Country: Saudi Arabia
- Dates: 4 April – 7 May 2010
- Teams: 8

Final positions
- Champions: Al-Ittihad
- Runners-up: Al-Hilal

Tournament statistics
- Matches played: 14
- Goals scored: 41 (2.93 per match)
- Top goal scorer: Saad Al-Harthi (5 goals)

The 2010 King Cup of Champions, or The Custodian of the Two Holy Mosques Cup, was the 35th season of King Cup of Champions since its establishment in 1957, and the 3rd under the current edition. Al-Shabab were the defending champion but they were eliminated by Al-Ittihad in semi-finals.

Al-Ittihad won their first title in the current edition and seventh overall after beating Al-Hilal 5–4 on penalties in the final.

== Participating teams ==
Team	Qualifying method	App*	Last App
Al-Hilal	2009–10 Professional League champions	3rd	2009
Al-Ittihad	2009–10 Professional League runners-up	3rd	2009
Al-Nassr	2009–10 Professional League 3rd place	3rd	2009
Al-Shabab	2009–10 Professional League 4th place	3rd	2009
Al-Wehda	2009–10 Professional League 5th place	3rd	2009
Al-Ahli	2009–10 Professional League 6th place	3rd	2009
Al-Hazm	2009–10 Professional League 7th place	3rd	2009
Al-Fateh	2009–10 Professional League 8th place	1st	none

* Number of appearance in King Cup of Champions since the 2008 season.

== Fixtures and results ==
=== Bracket ===
Quarter-finals
6	Al-Ahli	0	3	3
3	Al-Nassr	3	1	4
1	Al-Hilal	3	5	8
8	Al-Fateh	1	0	1
2	Al-Ittihad	4	0	4
7	Al-Hazm	1	0	1
4	Al-Shabab	1	0	1
5	Al-Wehda	0	0	0

Semi-finals
3	Al-Nassr	3	1	4
1	Al-Hilal	5	1	6
2	Al-Ittihad	2	2	4
4	Al-Shabab	0	1	1

Final
1	Al-Hilal	0 (4)
2	Al-Ittihad (p)	0 (5)
Third place
4	Al-Shabab	1
3	Al-Nassr	3

=== Quarter-finals ===
Quarter-finals were played on 4, 5, 8 & 9 April 2010.

Team 1	Agg.	Team 2	1st leg	2nd leg
Al-Shabab	1–0	Al-Wehda	1–0	0–0
Al-Hilal	8–1	Al-Fateh	3–1	5–0
Al-Ittihad	4–1	Al-Hazm	4–1	0–0
Al-Ahli	3–4	Al-Nassr	0–3	3–1

==== First leg ====
4 April 2010 1	Al-Shabab	1–0	Al-Wehda	Riyadh
20:35 (UTC+3)	Flávio 20'			Stadium: King Fahd International Stadium; Referee: Fahad Al-Mirdasi

4 April 2010 2	Al-Hilal	3–1	Al-Fateh	Riyadh
20:35 (UTC+3)	Al-Shalhoub 26' (pen.); Khairat 28'; Al-Mehyani 69'		Al-Hadrami 82'	Stadium: Prince Faisal bin Fahd Stadium; Referee: Fahad Al-Oraini

4 April 2010 3	Al-Ittihad	4–1	Al-Hazem	Jeddah
20:50 (UTC+3)	Al-Saqri 19'; Ziaya 28' (pen.); Noor 75'; Chermiti 86'		Ji 72'	Stadium: Prince Abdullah Al Faisal Stadium; Referee: Abdullah Al-Qahtani

5 April 2010 4	Al-Ahli	0–3	Al-Nassr	Jeddah
20:30 (UTC+3)			Al-Harthi 54', 61', 71'	Stadium: Prince Abdullah Al Faisal Stadium; Referee: Tomasz Mikulski (Poland)

==== Second leg ====
8 April 2010 5	Al-Fateh	0–5	Al-Hilal	Al-Hasa
20:35 (UTC+3)			Al-Abed 11'; Al-Qahtani 44', 61' (pen.); Al-Shalhoub 64'; Al-Mehyani 72'	Stadium: Prince Abdullah bin Jalawi Stadium; Referee: Abdulrahman Al-Qahtani

8 April 2010 6	Al-Hazem	0–0	Al-Ittihad	Ar Rass
20:35 (UTC+3)				Stadium: Al Hazm Club Stadium; Referee: Khalil Al Ghamdi

8 April 2010 7	Al-Wehda	0–0	Al-Shabab	Mecca
20:35 (UTC+3)				Stadium: King Abdul Aziz Stadium; Referee: Abdulrahman Al-Amri

9 April 2010 8	Al-Nassr	1–3	Al-Ahli	Riyadh
20:35 (UTC+3)	Feindouno 26'		Simões 11', 44' (pen.), 69'	Stadium: King Fahd International Stadium

=== Semi-finals ===
Semi-finals were played on 20–21 April and 2–3 May 2010.

Team 1	Agg.	Team 2	1st leg	2nd leg
Al-Nassr	4–6	Al-Hilal	3–5	1–1
Al-Ittihad	4–1	Al-Shabab	2–0	2–1

==== First leg ====
20 April 2010 9	Al-Nassr	3–5	Al-Hilal	Riyadh
21:00 (UTC+3)	Figueroa 62', 86' (pen.); Belal 79'		Al-Qahtani 8', 27'; Rădoi 25' (pen.), 90'; Nami 59'	Stadium: King Fahd International Stadium; Referee: Khalil Al Ghamdi

21 April 2010 10	Al-Ittihad	2–0	Al-Shabab	Jeddah
21:00 (UTC+3)	Abushgeer 50'; Ziaya 56'			Stadium: Prince Abdullah Al Faisal Stadium; Referee: Peter Sippel (Germany)

==== Second leg ====
2 May 2010 11	Al-Hilal	1–1	Al-Nassr	Riyadh
21:00 (UTC+3)	Neves 29'		Al-Harthi 57'	Stadium: King Fahd International Stadium

3 May 2010 12	Al-Shabab	1–2	Al-Ittihad	Riyadh
21:05 (UTC+3)	Flávio 51'		Kariri 39'; Hazazi 90'	Stadium: King Fahd International Stadium

=== Third Place ===
Third place game was played on 6 May 2010.

6 May 2010 13	Al-Shabab	1–3	Al-Nassr	Riyadh
21:00 (UTC+3)	Otaif 45' (pen.)		Figueroa 11' (pen.); Al-Harthi 40'; Al-Sahlawi 72'	Stadium: Prince Faisal bin Fahd Stadium; Referee: Marai Al-Awaji

=== Final ===
7 May 2010
21:00 UTC+3

Al-Hilal	0–0 (a.e.t.)	Al-Ittihad
Penalties
Al-Qahtani (penalty scored); Al-Mehyani (penalty scored); Lee Young-pyo (penalty scored); Wilhelmsson (penalty scored); Al-Fraidi (penalty missed)	4–5	(penalty scored) Kariri; (penalty scored) Ziaya; (penalty scored) Chermiti; (penalty scored) Al-Raheeb; (penalty scored) Noor

King Fahd International Stadium, Riyadh
Referee: Manuel Mejuto González (Spain)

==== Winner ====
King Cup of Champions
2010 Winners
Al-Ittihad
7th Title
