= Garni (disambiguation) =

Garni is a village in the Kotayk Province of Armenia.

Garni may also refer to:

- Garni (crater), an impact crater on Mars,
- Garni Gorge
- Temple of Garni, an Ionic temple in Garni, Armenia
- Bouquet garni, a bundle of herbs usually tied together with string and stewed
- Kelly Garni, American hard rock musician and photographer
- Garni, Sudan, village in Sudan

== See also ==
- Al-Garni, surname
