= Mohammed Al-Shahrani =

Mohammed Al-Shahrani may refer to:

- Mohammed Al-Shahrani (footballer, born 1982), Saudi footballer
- Mohammed Al-Shahrani (footballer, born 1996), Saudi footballer
