= Al-Qarni =

Al-Qarni (also Al-Garni) is a surname. Notable people with the name include:

- Abdullah Al-Garni (born 1987), Saudi Arabian footballer
- Aid al-Qarni (born 1960), Saudi Islamic Muslim scholar, author, and activist
- Assaf Al-Qarni (born 1984), Saudi Arabian football goalkeeper
- Fawaz Al-Qarni (born 1992), Saudi Arabian football goalkeeper
- Issam Al-Qarni (born 1995), Saudi football player
- Mohamad Al-Garni (born 1992), Moroccan-born Qatari middle-distance runner
- Mohammed Al-Qarni (footballer, born 1981), Saudi Arabian footballer
- Mohammed Al-Qarni (born 1989), Saudi Arabian football midfielder
- Mohsen Al-Garni (born 1985), Saudi Arabian football midfielder
- Musa al-Qarni, mufti of Osama bin Laden

== See also ==
- Garni (disambiguation)
