= Everton (footballer, born 1983) =

Brazilian footballer

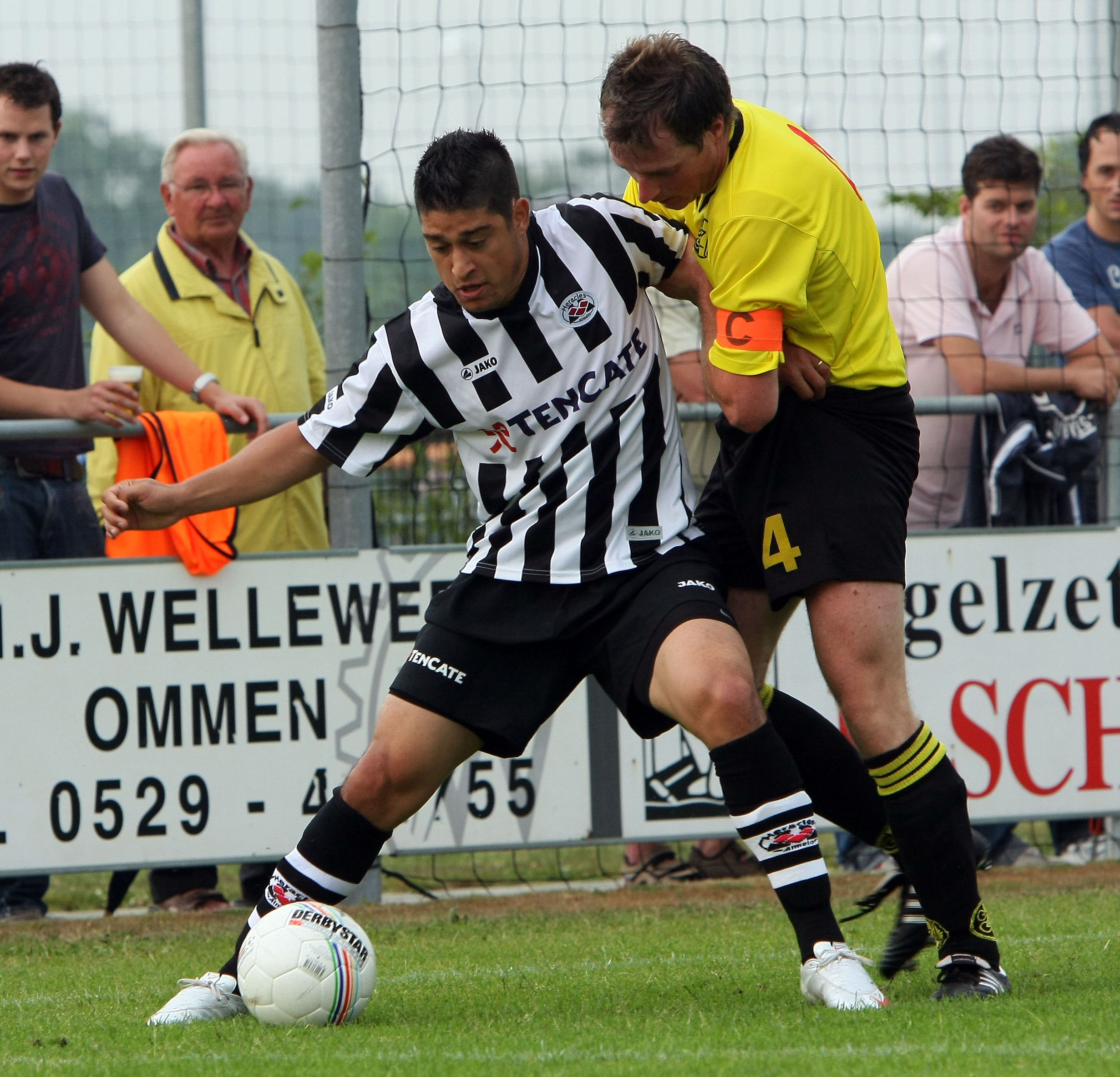
- Everton (left) with Heracles Almelo in 2009

Personal information
- Full name: Everton Ramos da Silva
- Date of birth: 8 June 1983 (age 43)
- Place of birth: São Paulo, Brazil
- Height: 1.77 m (5 ft 10 in)
- Positions: Winger; forward

Team information
- Current team: Ovarense

Youth career
- 1999–2001: Goianésia
- 2002–2003: Osasco
- 2003–2004: Barueri

Senior career*
Years	Team	Apps	(Gls)
2004–2006	Barueri	70	(53)
2006–2013	Heracles Almelo	218	(70)
2013–2014	Al-Nassr	8	(2)
2014–2015	Shanghai Shenxin	26	(6)
2016	Rio Claro	3	(0)
2016	Guarani	11	(2)
2017	Taubaté	18	(9)
2017	Ituano	6	(1)
2017	Bragantino	4	(0)
2018	XV de Piracicaba	17	(7)
2018–2019	Cinfães	27	(13)
2019–2020	Paredes	24	(2)
2020–2021	Pedras Rubras	9	(1)
2021–2022	Paivense		
2022–2023	ADC Lobão		
2023–	Ovarense		
- * Club domestic league appearances and goals as of 24 January 2021

Everton Ramos da Silva (born 8 June 1983), known as just Everton, is a Brazilian footballer who plays for Portuguese club Ovarense.

== Career ==
=== Barueri ===
Everton joined Heracles after playing in the youth of Grêmio Barueri. In the 2004–05 season Everton scored 36 goals for Grêmio followed by 17 in the 2005–06 campaign which helped to promote Grêmio to the highest division. Instead of choosing one of the bigger clubs in his native Brazil, he signed a contract with Dutch team, Heracles Almelo.

=== Heracles Almelo ===
Everton played his first league match for Heracles on 27 August 2006, in an away match against Feyenoord. The match ended in a goalless draw. Everton scored his first two goals on 16 September 2009 when Heracles won 3–0 over Utrecht. With an away goal against Feyenoord on 14 March 2010, he became all-time Heracles top scorer in the Eredivisie, scoring 32 goals.

=== Later career ===
On 27 May 2013, Everton signed a three-year contract at Saudi Arabian team Al-Nassr. During his time at the club, he won the Saudi Crown Prince Cup.

After he did not receive his salary from Al-Nassr for five months, Everton signed with Chinese club Shanghai Shenxin on 20 July 2014. He penned a two-and-a-half-year contract.

In 2016, Everton returned to Brazil, and first played for Rio Claro and since also represented Guarani, Taubaté, Ituano, Bragantino and XV de Piracicaba through a period of two years.

In 2018, Everton moved to Portugal where he signed with third division club Cinfães. In 2019, he moved to Paredes. In 2020, he signed with Pedras Rubras.

== Career statistics ==
Season	Club	Apps	Goals	Competition
2003–2006	Gremio Barueri	70	53	
2006–07	Heracles Almelo	24	9	Eredivisie
2007–08	Heracles Almelo	33	8	Eredivisie
2008–09	Heracles Almelo	27	5	Eredivisie
2009–10	Heracles Almelo	34	14	Eredivisie
2010–11	Heracles Almelo	33	15	Eredivisie
2011–12	Heracles Almelo	21	6	Eredivisie
Totaal		244	110	

== Honours ==
Al-Nassr

- Saudi Crown Prince Cup: 2013–14
