= Hadi Al Abbas =

Saudi Arabian footballer

Personal information
- Full name: Hadi Al Abbas
- Date of birth: 29 November 1985 (age 40)
- Place of birth: Qatif, Saudi Arabia
- Position: Midfielder

Youth career
- Al-Taraji

Senior career*
| Years | Team | Apps | (Gls) |
| 2006–2009 | Al-Taraji | | |
| 2009–2016 | Al-Khaleej | | |
| 2017–2018 | Al-Khaleej | | |
| 2018–2019 | Al-Taraji | | |
- * Club domestic league appearances and goals

Hadi Al Abbas (Arabic: هادي آل عباس; born 29 November 1985) is a Saudi Arabian football player who plays as a midfielder.
