= Garni, Sudan =

Village in North Darfur, Sudan

Garni is a village in Sudan, located northwest of El Fasher.

== History ==
On 2 August 2025, 15 people trying to flee El Fasher to Garni were reportedly killed by the Rapid Support Forces (RSF).
