= Ibrahim Al Hatrash =

Saudi Arabian footballer

Personal information
- Full name: Ibrahim Al Hatrash Al-Yami
- Date of birth: July 7, 1990 (age 36)
- Place of birth: Saudi Arabia
- Height: 1.74 m (5 ft 9 in)
- Position: Winger

Youth career
- Najran

Senior career*
Years	Team	Apps	(Gls)
2012–2015	Najran	23	(3)
2015–2016	Damac		
2016–2017	Najran		
2017–2020	Al-Diriyah		
2021–2022	Al-Sharq		
2022	Al-Saqer		
- * Club domestic league appearances and goals

Ibrahim Al Hatrash (born 7 July 1990) is a Saudi football player. He plays as a winger.
