= Gabriel Weimann =

Israeli researcher

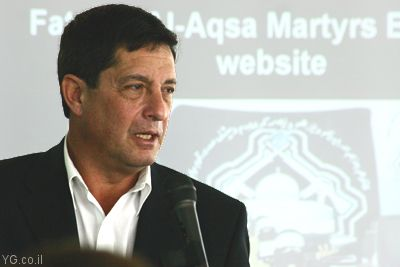

Gabriel "Gabi" Weimann (Hebrew: גבריאל (גבי) וימן; born September 1, 1950) is an Emeritus Professor of Communications at the University of Haifa and a former fellow at the Woodrow Wilson International Center for Scholars. Weimann is known for having begun to track and study terrorist websites in the mid 1990s, "long before most analysts were aware of the problem." His 9 books, papers and research reports (7 monographs and more than 210 publications) have been published in scientific journals and books. He received numerous grants and awards from international foundations and was a visiting professor at various universities, including the University of Pennsylvania, Stanford University, Hofstra University, American University, University of Maryland, and Lehigh University (USA), University of Mainz and LMU Munich (Germany), Carleton University (Canada), and the National University of Singapore.

Weimann has been called one of Israel's leading experts on cyberterrorism.

== Books ==
- Hate on Trial: The Zundel Case, the Media and Public Opinion in Canada; co-author Conrad Winn, (1986) Toronto: Mosaic Press, Canada, 201 pp.
- The Theater of Terror: The Mass Media and International Terrorism, co-author Conrad Winn, (1993) New York: Longman Publishing/Addison-Wesley, 295 pp.
- The Influentials: People Who Influence People, (1994) New York: State University of New York Press (SUNY), 380 pp.
- Communicating Unreality: Mass Media and Reconstruction of Realities, (2000) Los Angeles: Sage Publications. 440 pp.
- The Singaporean Enigma, co-author Baruch Nevo, (2001) Jerusalem: Zivonim, 248 pp. (H).
- Terror on the Internet: The New Arena, (2006) The New Challenges. Washington, DC: United States Institute of Peace Press., 309 pp. James Fallows of The Atlantic calls Terror on the Internet, an "influential" book.
- Freedom and Terror: Reason and Unreason in Politics, co-author Abraham Kaplan (2011), Abraham London: Routledge, 189 pp.
- Social Research for Democracy: The Story of the Israeli Institute of Applied Social Research. (2015) Jerusalem: Zivonim (forthcoming) (H).
- Terror in Cyberspace: The Next Generation, (2015) New York: Columbia University Press.
