= Obaid Al-Shamrani =

Saudi Arabian footballer

Obaid Al Shamrani عبيد الشمراني
Personal information
- Full name: Obaid Hassan Al Shamrani
- Date of birth: 24 July 1985 (age 41)
- Place of birth: Saudi Arabia
- Height: 1.79 m (5 ft 10 in)
- Position: Defender

Youth career
- Al-Ittihad

Senior career*
Years	Team	Apps	(Gls)
2007–2010	Al-Ittihad		
2010–2013	Al-Raed		
2013–2014	Al-Nahda		
2017–2018	Al-Diriyah		
- * Club domestic league appearances and goals as of 31 July 2020

Obaid Al Shamrani (Arabic: عبيد الشمراني; born 24 July 1985) is a Saudi Arabian footballer who plays as a defender.

== Career ==
He formerly played for Al-Ittihad, Al-Raed, Al-Nahda, and Al-Diriyah.
