= Hussain Al-Turki =

Saudi Arabian footballer

Personal information
- Full name: Hussain Abdullah Turki Al Zindeddine
- Date of birth: 28 May 1982 (age 44)
- Place of birth: Qatif, Saudi Arabia
- Position: Forward

Youth career
- –2002: Al-Khaleej

Senior career*
Years	Team	Apps	(Gls)
2002–2004	Al-Khaleej		
2004–2006	Al-Ahli		
2005	→ Al-Khaleej (loan)		
2005–2006	→ Al-Riyadh (loan)		
2006–2016	Al-Khaleej		(36)
2020	Al-Khaleej		
- * Club domestic league appearances and goals

Hussain Al-Turki (Arabic: حسين التركي; born 28 May 1982) is a Saudi footballer who plays as a forward.
