= Wilsinho (footballer, born 1982) =

Brazilian footballer

Personal information
- Full name: Wilson Antônio de Resende Júnior
- Date of birth: 20 August 1982 (age 44)
- Place of birth: Goiânia, Brazil
- Position: Forward

Senior career*
Years	Team	Apps	(Gls)
2002	Mineiros		
2002–2005	Anapolina		
2003–2004	→ Goiânia (loan)		
2004–2005	→ Goiatuba (loan)		
2005–2006	Feirense	15	(1)
2006–2007	Caldas Novas		
2007–2008	Najran SC		
2008–2009	Al-Wakrah		
2009–2010	Al Jahra		
2010–2014	Al Salibikhaet		
2015–2016	Muaither SC		
- * Club domestic league appearances and goals as of 1 June 2011

Wilson Antônio de Resende Júnior, commonly known as Wilsinho (born 20 August 1982 in Goiânia, Goiás), is a Brazilian footballer who plays as a forward.
