= Thamer Al-Meshauqeh =

Saudi Arabian footballer

Thamer Al-Meshauqeh ثامر المشيقح
Personal information
- Full name: Thamer Ibrahim Al-Meshauqeh
- Date of birth: 22 April 1991 (age 35)
- Place of birth: Buraidah, Saudi Arabia
- Height: 1.69 m (5 ft 7 in)
- Position: Forward

Youth career
- –2011: Al-Taawon

Senior career*
Years	Team	Apps	(Gls)
2011–2015	Al-Taawon	16	(0)
2015–2017	Al-Asyah		
2017–2019	Al-Bukayriyah		
- * Club domestic league appearances and goals

Thamer Al-Meshauqeh (Arabic: ثامر المشيقح, born 22 April 1991) is a Saudi Arabian professional footballer who plays as a forward.

== Career ==
Al-Meshauqeh started his career at Al-Taawon and is a product of the Al-Taawoun's youth system. On 2 September 2012, Al-Meshauqeh made his professional debut for Al-Taawoun against Al-Raed in the Pro League, replacing Yassin Hamzah . He then played with Al-Asyah, and Al-Bukayriyah.

== Career statistics ==
=== Club ===
As of match played 29 July 2020

Club	Season	League		King Cup		Asia		Other		Total	
Club	Season	Apps	Goals	Apps	Goals	Apps	Goals	Apps	Goals	Apps	Goals
Al-Taawoun	2011–12	0	0	0	0	—			—	0	0
Al-Taawoun	2012–13	6	0	0	0	—			—	6	0
Al-Taawoun	2013–14	7	0	1	1	—			—	8	1
Al-Taawoun	2014–15	3	0	0	0	—			—	3	0
Al-Taawoun	Total	16	0	1	1	0	0	0	0	17	1
Career totals		16	0	1	1	0	0	0	0	17	1
