= Majed Assiri =

Saudi Arabian footballer

Personal information
- Full name: Majed Assiri
- Date of birth: 27 April 1991 (age 35)
- Place of birth: Jeddah, Saudi Arabia
- Position: Left-back

Youth career
- Al-Qadsiah

Senior career*
Years	Team	Apps	(Gls)
2011–2014	Al-Qadsiah		
2014–2016	Al-Ahli	0	(0)
2015–2016	→ Al-Raed (loan)	4	(0)

International career^{‡}
2012–	Saudi Arabia	1	(0)
- * Club domestic league appearances and goals as of 22 December 2017 ‡ National team caps and goals as of 20:31, 22 December 2017 (UTC)

Majed Assiri (Arabic: ماجد عسيري; born 27 April 1991) is a former Saudi football player who played as a left-back in the Pro League for Al-Qadsiah and Al-Raed.
