= Al-Fateh =

Palestinian Islamic children's magazine

- Founded: 2002
- Language: Arabic
- Website: al-fateh.net alfatehmag.net

Al-Fateh (Arabic: الفاتح, "The Conqueror") was a Hamas run online children's magazine in Arabic. It began publication in September 2002, and its 108th issue was released in mid-September 2007. The magazine featured stories, poems, riddles, and puzzles. The website published antisemitic, anti-zionist, anti-western, and islamist content.

== Views ==
=== The West ===
In its publication The West in portrayed as inferior to Islam, with readers encouraged to avoid "Western imperialist clothing" and avoid celebrating Valentine's Day. The magazine also claims that Arabs discovered electricity, discovered the earth is round, created the first human rights charter, and discovered the Americas centuries before Christopher Columbus. The magazine claims that the West has engaged in a conspiracy to conceal the Arab origins of these discoveries.The magazine describes the West as hostile to the arabs, with the West being depicted as colonizers, islamophobic, arabophobic, and as a decadent corrupting influence. In line with an antisemitic and extreme anti-Israel worldview, the West are viewed as historic aggressors against the Muslim world and allies of Israel. Historic events such as the Crusades as well as modern events such as the Kashmir conflict, Chechen Wars, and Invasions of Iraq and Afghanistan being used as evidence. The magazine also encourages a revanchist position, with one issue including the city of Seville praying for readers to return it to Muslim control.

The magazine claims that due to its morally righteous cause, that Islam will eventually prevail over the West, and that the West and especially America will collapse. Readers are encouraged to "carry a weapon and fight the Jews, the Serbs, and the Russians, and anyone who attacks the Muslims".

The magazines definition of the West often includes Russia and India, which are often not considered part of the West.

=== Jews and Israel ===
Al-Fateh's outlook on Israel is that the country is evil and illegitimate and that the state should be destroyed and taken over by the Palestinians. The site denies any idea of Jewish ties to the land. Al-Fateh claims that the ancient Canaanites, which it calls "Canaanite Arabs", were Arabs and the ancestors of the Palestinians and that Palestinians have lived in the region for 5000 years, supposedly preceding Jewish claims on the region. Jewish claims on the region are portrayed as only coming in the modern era, and as being insignificant. The magazine additionally claims that the mainstream historical view of the topic, which contradicts the magazines narrative, is an Israeli lie.

The website contains many antisemitic attacks calling Jews: "the most despicable of God's creatures", "the lowest of the human race", "like a cancer which has to be gotten rid of", "the murderers of the prophets", "satanic Jews" among other things. The website also engages in Holocaust denial, a comic within the website shows two Hasidic Jews discussing how they have profited off of lying about the Holocaust as a sack of money several times larger than them with the words "the holocaust" on it sits to their right.

== Criticism ==
Several Israeli reviews and news coverages of the site describe it as hate-mongering and accuse it of glorifying death and suicide for Allah.

The pro-Israel advocacy group MEMRI has said that the magazine includes idealized illustrations of child warriors as wagers of Jihad.

Mozes and Weimann characterize the level of visual extremism present in the magazine as being "not especially high," and generally not evocative of "strong emotions", with certain exceptions.^{:217-8}

The Intelligence and Terrorism Information Center has stated that "Issue number 38 of Al-Fateh, includes a photograph of the severed head of a female suicide bomber."

The Anti-Defamation League stated that the website "advocates hatred of Jews". They reported that an issue from 1 March 2006, following Hamas's political victory in the Palestinian legislative election, highlights a Hamas suicide bomber, Nassim Jabari, who participated in an August 2004 attack that killed 16 people in Israel. The issue also shows a figure of a girl throwing stones from a slingshot, and a poem next to the figure which in part reads: "The blood of the shahid has taught us/that martyrdom is like a new life…/and indeed martyrdom is an evident victory.". An issue from 1 May 2007 includes a "games" section with a virtual "Chutes and Ladders" board game consisting of images of Israeli soldiers with snake bodies and tongues and caricatures of children throwing stones, entitled "The Palestinian kid and the Israeli soldier."

According to PMW, an Israeli watchdog organization, terrorism for children is glorified on the website. On 15 March 2006, the website posted a short fictional story for children, entitled "A Palestinian Girl's Heroism," glorifying a young girl's suicide terror attack. In death, she is said to be "smiling, lying on the grass, because she died as a Shahida (Martyr for Allah) for Palestine." The PMW further reports that, following their publicization of the website, the Russian server (CORBINA TELECOM Network Operations) immediately closed it down on 9 March 2006, and that it reopened days later on a Malaysian web-hoster. The website has since been inactive.

== See also ==
- Al-Aqsa TV
- Palestinian Information Center
