= Garni (crater) =

Crater on Mars

Garni crater
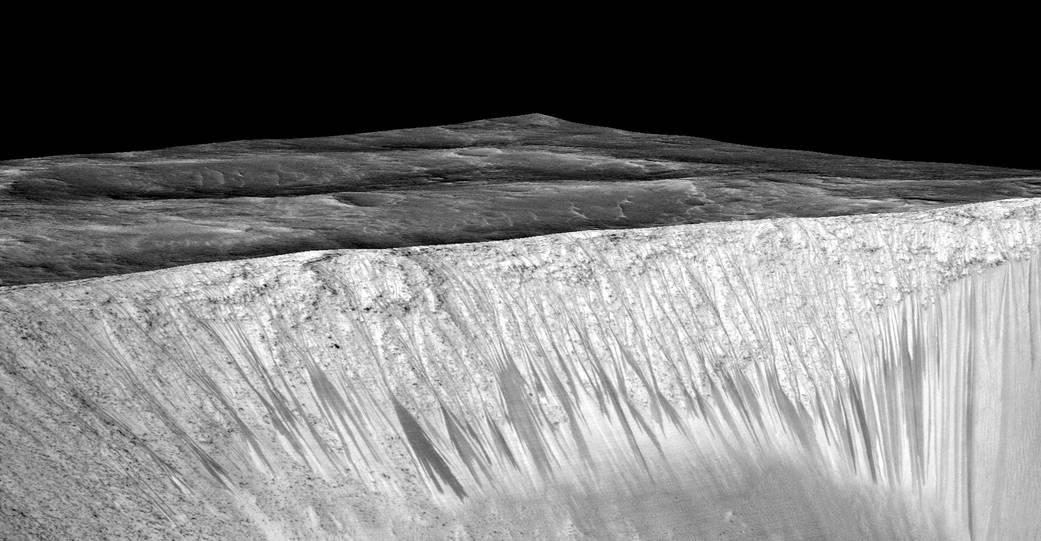
- Garni crater imaged by HiRISE (processed image)
- Planet: Mars
- Coordinates: 11.52°S 69.7°W
- Quadrangle: Coprates
- Diameter: 2.57 km (1.60 mi)

Garni is an impact crater on Mars, in which, according to NASA, there is evidence of liquid water. In the press release of its finding on 28 September 2015, NASA considered it "the latest of many breakthroughs" in their Mars exploration. NASA and the US Geological Survey named the crater after the Armenian village of Garni. The naming was approved and adopted by the International Astronomical Union (IAU) on April 24, 2015.

== Mineral analysis ==
According to the NASA press release, "Dark narrow streaks, called 'recurring slope lineae', emanate from the walls of Garni Crater on Mars..." Researchers, who used a spectrometer of the Mars Reconnaissance Orbiter, have found hydrated minerals on the streaks of the crater. Dark streaks have been developed over the course of time and are believed to be a few hundred meters long.

During a warmer climate, the streaks tend to darken and flow downwards. However, in a cooler climate the streaks begin to fade. Such streaks have been discovered in numerous areas on Mars only when temperatures are above −23 degrees Celsius (−10 degrees Fahrenheit). However, they do not appear at colder times. It is estimated that the hydrated salts may have dropped the liquid brine's freezing point. Scientists believe that it is because of water that these areas of the crater have been darkened.

== Garni space astronomy institute and space museum ==
In Garni Space Astronomy Institute under Grigor Gurzadyan have been created orbital Orion 1 and Orion 2 Space Observatories, over 40 Soviets cosmonauts have passed their pre-flight training there. In June 2001 a space museum was opened in the territory of the institute, in Garni, Armenia. The exhibit, which occurred on the 1700th anniversary of Armenia's adoption of Christianity, was dedicated to that event. In November 2015 the enriched exposition of the Space museum was reopened but in Yerevan, Armenia The museum includes various exhibits associated to the participation of Armenian scientists in space exploration.

== See also ==
- List of craters on Mars
- List of places named after Armenia
- Water on Mars
