= Waleed Al-Gizani =

Saudi Arabian footballer

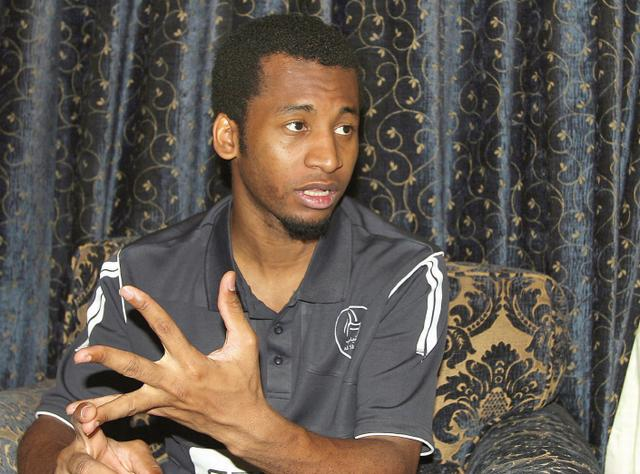
- 2014

Personal information
- Full name: Waleed Khaled Abd Rabo Al-Gizani
- Date of birth: 26 February 1981 (age 45)
- Place of birth: Jeddah, Saudi Arabia
- Height: 1.80 m (5 ft 11 in)
- Position: Striker

Youth career
- 2000–2003: Al-Ahli

Senior career*
Years	Team	Apps	(Gls)
2003–2008	Al-Ahli	150	(50)
2007	→ Al-Shabab (loan)	9	(4)
2008–2010	Al-Hazm	31	(17)
2010	Al-Shabab	4	(0)
2010–2011	Al-Hilal	17	(6)
2011–2013	Al-Raed	40	(9)
2013–2014	Al-Shoalah	0	(0)
2014–2016	Al-Orobah F.C.		
2016	Al-Riyadh		
2016–2017	Al Jabalain		

International career
2002–2004	Saudi Arabia	4	(0)
- * Club domestic league appearances and goals

Waleed Al-Gizani (Arabic: وليد الجيزاني; born 26 February 1981) is a Saudi football player.

== Honours ==
=== Club ===
- Al-Hilal
  Saudi Crown Prince Cup: 2011

=== Individual ===
- 2009 King Cup of Champions: Top scorers
