= Issam Merdassi =

Tunisian footballer

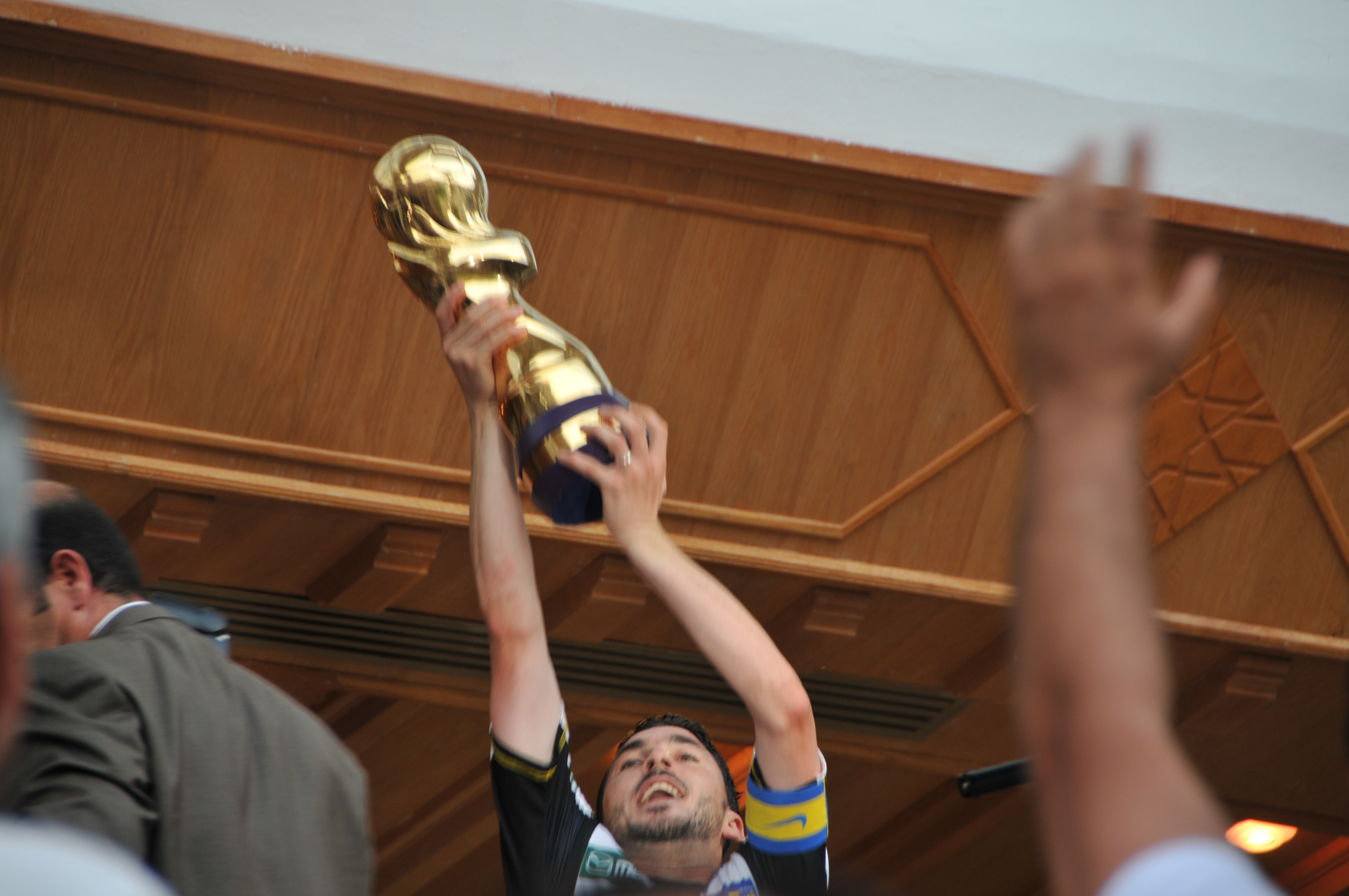

Personal information
- Date of birth: 16 March 1981 (age 45)
- Place of birth: Sfax, Tunisia
- Height: 1.91 m (6 ft 3 in)
- Position: Defender

Team information
- Current team: AS Rejiche (manager)

Senior career*
Years	Team	Apps	(Gls)
2002–2009	CS Sfaxien		
2007–2008	→ Al-Nassr (loan)		
2009–2011	BSC Young Boys	20	(0)
2011–2013	Misr El Makasa		

International career
2006	Tunisia	2	(0)

Managerial career
- 2020–2021: Sfax Railways Sports
- 2021–: AS Rejiche
- * Club domestic league appearances and goals

Issam Merdassi (Arabic: عصام المرداسي, born 16 March 1981) is a Tunisian footballer.

Merdassi played until 2006 for CS Sfaxien then went on loan to Saudi Al-Nassr before returning to CS Sfaxien for one season 2008–2009 and finally he was transferred to BSC Young Boys in summer 2009.

He was a member of the Tunisian 2004 Olympic football team, who exited in the first round, finishing third in group C, behind group and gold medal winners Argentina and runners-up Australia.

After managing Sfax Railways Sports, he was appointed manager of AS Rejiche in 2021.
