= Charles Edoa =

Cameroonian footballer

Personal information
- Full name: Charles Edoa Nga
- Date of birth: 17 May 1990 (age 36)
- Place of birth: Cameroon
- Height: 1.79 m (5 ft 10 in)
- Position: Striker

Team information
- Current team: Royal Leopard

Senior career*
Years	Team	Apps	(Gls)
2008–2013	Union Douala		
2013–2014	Al-Orobah F.C.	21	(3)
2013–2014	Al-Ta'ee		
2016–2017	Union Douala		
2017	Recreativo da Caála		
2017	Eding Sport		
2019–	Royal Leopard		

International career
2013	Cameroon	1	(0)
- * Club domestic league appearances and goals

Charles Edoa Nga (born 17 May 1990) is a Cameroonian professional association footballer who plays as a striker for Royal Leopard in the Premier League of Eswatini.

== Club career ==
=== Union Douala ===
Between 2008 and 2013 he played for Union Douala in his country.

=== Shillong Lajong ===
In June 2013, he joined the Indian I-League side Shillong Lajong FC. Though this stint lasted long only for two months.

=== Al-Orobah F.C. ===
In 10 August, he signed for Al-Orobah F.C. in the Saudi Professional League.

=== Royal Leopards F.C. ===
Edoa scored the winning goal on his debut for Royal Leopards F.C. in February 2019.

== International career ==
He made his senior debut for Cameroon against Tanzania, coming as a substitute.
