= Fahed Al-Mobarak =

Saudi Arabian footballer

Personal information
- Full name: Fahed Al-Mobarak
- Date of birth: January 15, 1984 (age 42)
- Place of birth: Saudi Arabia
- Height: 1.74 m (5 ft 8 1/2 in)
- Position: Midfielder

Youth career
- 2003: Al-Hilal

Senior career*
Years	Team	Apps	(Gls)
2003–2009	Al-Hilal		
2010–2011	Al Faisaly		
2011–2013	Ettifaq FC		
2013–2015	Al-Shoalah		
- * Club domestic league appearances and goals

Fahed Al-Mobarak was a football player for Al-Hilal in the Saudi Premier League.
