= Fahed Al-Mofarij =

Saudi Arabian footballer

Personal information
- Full name: Fahad Abdullah A. Al-Mefarej
- Date of birth: 12 April 1978 (age 48)
- Place of birth: Riyadh, Saudi Arabia
- Height: 1.83 m (6 ft 0 in)
- Position: Defender

Youth career
- 1994-1998: Al-Hilal

Senior career*
Years	Team	Apps	(Gls)
1998–2009	Al-Hilal		
2009–2011	Al-Ettifaq		
- * Club domestic league appearances and goals

Fahed Al-Mofarij is a retired footballer who last played for Al-Ettifaq in the Saudi Premier League. He was the executive director of football at Al-Hilal until May 23, 2026.

Al-Mofarij played for Al Hilal in the 2009 AFC Champions League group stages.
