= Mohammad Al-Shalhoub =

Saudi Arabian footballer (born 1980)

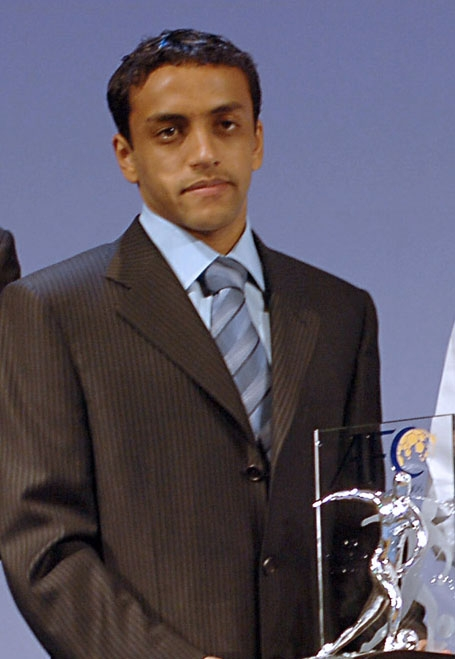
- Al-Shalhoub in 2008

Personal information
- Full name: Mohammad Bandar Saud Al-Shalhoub
- Date of birth: 8 December 1980 (age 45)
- Place of birth: Riyadh, Saudi Arabia
- Height: 1.63 m (5 ft 4 in)
- Position: Attacking midfielder

Youth career
- 1993–1998: Al-Hilal

Senior career*
| Years | Team | Apps | (Gls) |
| 1999–2020 | Al-Hilal | 329 | (64) |

International career^{‡}
| 2000–2018 | Saudi Arabia | 118 | (19) |

Managerial career
- 2022–2023: Al-Hilal U17
- 2023–2025: Al-Hilal (assistant)
- 2025: Al-Hilal (caretaker)
- * Club domestic league appearances and goals as of 18:08, 16 September 2020 (UTC) ‡ National team caps and goals as of 28 September 2020

Mohammad Bandar Saud Al-Shalhoub (Arabic: مُحَمَّد بَنْدَر سُعُود الشَّلْهُوب; born 8 December 1980) is a Saudi Arabian former footballer and was the assistant manager of Al-Hilal. He played as an attacking midfielder for Al Hilal in the Saudi Professional League. A legend of Saudi football, he won 33 trophies with Al Hilal and one title with the Saudi Arabia national team, making him one of the most decorated footballers of all time.

On 30 November 2006, Al-Shalhoub came third in the Asian Footballer of the Year award, after eventual winner Khalfan Ibrahim from Qatar and Bader Al-Mutawa from Kuwait.

== Club career ==
Al-Shalhoub started his professional career with Al Hilal in 1998. On 11 September 2020, he announced his retirement.

== Club statistics ==
As of match played 18 September 2023

| Club | Season | League | | King Cup | | Crown Prince Cup | | Asia | | Other | | Total | |
| Club | Season | Apps | Goals | Apps | Goals | Apps | Goals | Apps | Goals | Apps | Goals | Apps | Goals |
|---|---|---|---|---|---|---|---|---|---|---|---|---|---|
| Al-Hilal | 1998–99 | 16 | 2 | 0 | 0 | 0 | 0 | 0 | 0 | 1 (Note: One appearance in Prince Faisal bin Fahd League U-21) | 1 | 17 | 3 |
| Al-Hilal | 1999–00 | 18 | 3 | 0 | 0 | 3 | 1 | 6 | 0 | 5 (Note: five appearances in GCC Champions League) | 0 | 32 | 4 |
| Al-Hilal | 2000–01 | 10 | 0 | 0 | 0 | 2 | 0 | 5 | 0 | 9 (Note: Five appearances in Arab Cup Winners' Cup, Three appearances in Arab Super Cup, and one appearance in Saudi-Egyptian Super Cup) | 2 | 26 | 2 |
| Al-Hilal | 2001–02 | 10 | 2 | 0 | 0 | 0 | 0 | 0 | 0 | 6 (Note: One appearances in Arab Cup Winners' Cup, Three appearances in Asian Cup Winners' Cup, and Two appearances in Asian Super Cup) | 0 | 16 | 2 |
| Al-Hilal | 2002–03 | 12 | 2 | 0 | 0 | 4 | 1 | 3 | 0 | 4 (Note: four appearances in GCC Champions League) | 2 | 29 | 5 |
| Al-Hilal | 2003–04 | 15 | 2 | 0 | 0 | 0 | 0 | 1 | 0 | 9 (Note: One appearance in Arab Club Champions Cup) | 1 | 24 | 5 |
| Al-Hilal | 2004–05 | 14 | 4 | 0 | 0 | 4 | 1 | 0 | 0 | 11 (Note: Eleven appearances in Arab Club Champions Cup) | 2 | 30 | 7 |
| Al-Hilal | 2005–06 | 13 | 4 | 0 | 0 | 5 | 1 | 4 | 2 | 0 | 0 | 30 | 8 |
| Al-Hilal | 2006–07 | 19 | 5 | 0 | 0 | 4 | 0 | 3 | 0 | 0 | 0 | 25 | 5 |
| Al-Hilal | 2007–08 | 17 | 2 | 3 | 0 | 5 | 0 | 2 | 0 | 2 | 0 | 28 | 3 |
| Al-Hilal | 2008–09 | 11 | 3 | 3 | 0 | 0 | 0 | 5 | 0 | 1 (Note: One appearance in Prince Faisal bin Fahd League U-21) | 1 | 24 | 4 |
| Al-Hilal | 2009–10 | 20 | 12 | 4 | 2 | 4 | 0 | 5 | 0 | 0 | 0 | 33 | 14 |
| Al-Hilal | 2010–11 | 25 | 5 | 4 | 1 | 4 | 1 | 11 | 2 | 0 | 0 | 44 | 9 |
| Al-Hilal | 2011–12 | 20 | 7 | 3 | 0 | 4 | 2 | 5 | 1 | 0 | 0 | 32 | 10 |
| Al-Hilal | 2012–13 | 15 | 1 | 2 | 1 | 3 | 1 | 7 | 2 | 0 | 0 | 27 | 5 |
| Al-Hilal | 2013–14 | 16 | 2 | 2 | 1 | 0 | 0 | 8 | 0 | 0 | 0 | 26 | 3 |
| Al-Hilal | 2014–15 | 12 | 1 | 2 | 0 | 1 | 0 | 5 | 1 | 0 | 0 | 20 | 2 |
| Al-Hilal | 2015–16 | 17 | 1 | 1 | 0 | 2 | 0 | 8 | 1 | 1 | 0 | 29 | 2 |
| Al-Hilal | 2016–17 | 10 | 2 | 5 | 0 | 3 | 0 | 6 | 1 | 1 | 0 | 35 | 3 |
| Al-Hilal | 2017–18 | 8 | 2 | 1 | 0 | 0 | 0 | 8 | 0 | 0 | 0 | 25 | 2 |
| Al-Hilal | 2018–19 | 12 | 1 | 3 | 1 | 0 | 0 | 5 | 2 | 7 | 0 | 27 | 4 |
| Al-Hilal | 2019–20 | 5 | 0 | 3 | 3 | 0 | 0 | 7 | 1 | 0 | 0 | 15 | 3 |
| Total | | 311 | 64 | 36 | 9 | 49 | 8 | 101 | 13 | 46 | 8 | 543 | 102 |
| Career totals | | 311 | 63 | 36 | 9 | 49 | 8 | 101 | 13 | 46 | 8 | 543 | 102 |

- Assist Goals

| Season | Team | Assists |
|---|---|---|
| 1998–99 | Al-Hilal FC | |
| 1999–00 | Al-Hilal FC | |
| 2000–01 | Al-Hilal FC | |
| 2001–02 | Al-Hilal FC | |
| 2002–03 | Al-Hilal FC | 2 |
| 2003–04 | Al-Hilal FC | 6 |
| 2004–05 | Al-Hilal FC | 3 |
| 2005–06 | Al-Hilal FC | 3 |
| 2006–07 | Al-Hilal FC | 4 |
| 2007–08 | Al-Hilal FC | 2 |
| 2008–09 | Al-Hilal FC | 0 |
| 2009–10 | Al-Hilal FC | 5 |
| 2010–11 | Al-Hilal FC | 5 |
| 2011–12 | Al-Hilal FC | 6 |
| 2012–13 | Al-Hilal FC | 3 |
| 2013–14 | Al-Hilal FC | 2 |
| 2014–15 | Al-Hilal FC | 5 |
| 2015–16 | Al-Hilal FC | 3 |
| 2016–17 | Al-Hilal FC | 1 |
| 2017–18 | Al-Hilal FC | 0 |
| 2018–19 | Al-Hilal FC | 4 |
| 2019–20 | Al-Hilal FC | 0 |
| Total | Al-Hilal FC | 54 |

== International career ==
He has been a member of the Saudi Arabia national team since 2000 when he was just twenty years old, and made his debut on 17 October 2000 against Qatar in the 2000 AFC Asian Cup. Al-Shalhoub was called up for the squad to participate in the 2006 FIFA World Cup.

=== International caps ===
As of 28 February 2018

Saudi Arabia national team
| Year | Apps | Goals |
|---|---|---|
| 2000 | 15 | 3 |
| 2001 | 10 | 3 |
| 2002 | 1 | 0 |
| 2003 | 11 | 4 |
| 2004 | 10 | 2 |
| 2005 | 9 | 2 |
| 2006 | 14 | 3 |
| 2007 | 13 | 1 |
| 2008 | 15 | 0 |
| 2009 | 5 | 0 |
| 2010 | 7 | 1 |
| 2011 | 6 | 0 |
| 2012 | 1 | 0 |
| 2018 | 1 | 0 |
| Total | 118 | 19 |

=== International goals ===
Scores and results list Saudi Arabia's goal tally first.

| # | Date | Venue | Opponent | Score | Result | Competition |
|---|---|---|---|---|---|---|
| 1. | 20 October 2000 | Saida Municipal Stadium, Sidon | Uzbekistan | 2–0 | 5–0 | 2000 AFC Asian Cup |
| 2. | 20 October 2000 | Saida Municipal Stadium, Sidon | Uzbekistan | 3–0 | 5–0 | 2000 AFC Asian Cup |
| 3. | 20 October 2000 | Saida Municipal Stadium, Sidon | Uzbekistan | 4–0 | 5–0 | 2000 AFC Asian Cup |
| 4. | 8 February 2001 | Prince Mohamed bin Fahd Stadium, Dammam | Mongolia | 1–0 | 6–0 | 2002 FIFA World Cup qualifier |
| 5. | 8 February 2001 | Prince Mohamed bin Fahd Stadium, Dammam | Mongolia | 3–0 | 6–0 | 2002 FIFA World Cup qualifier |
| 6. | 15 February 2001 | Prince Mohamed bin Fahd Stadium, Dammam | Mongolia | 2–0 | 6–0 | 2002 FIFA World Cup qualifier |
| 7. | 6 October 2003 | Prince Abdullah Al Faisal Stadium, Jeddah | Yemen | 6–0 | 7–0 | 2004 AFC Asian Cup qualifier |
| 8. | 13 October 2003 | Prince Abdullah Al Faisal Stadium, Jeddah | Yemen | 3–1 | 3–1 | 2004 AFC Asian Cup qualifier |
| 9. | 17 October 2003 | Prince Abdullah Al Faisal Stadium, Jeddah | Indonesia | 2–0 | 6–0 | 2004 AFC Asian Cup qualifier |
| 10. | 26 December 2003 | Al Kuwait Sports Club Stadium, Kuwait City | United Arab Emirates | 1–0 | 2–0 | 16th Arabian Gulf Cup |
| 11. | 4 January 2004 | Al Kuwait Sports Club Stadium, Kuwait City | Kuwait | 1–0 | 1–1 | 16th Arabian Gulf Cup |
| 12. | 17 November 2004 | Prince Mohamed bin Fahd Stadium, Dammam | Sri Lanka | 2–0 | 3–0 | 2006 FIFA World Cup qualifier |
| 13. | 3 June 2005 | King Fahd International Stadium, Riyadh | Kuwait | 1–0 | 3–0 | 2006 FIFA World Cup qualifier |
| 14. | 3 June 2005 | King Fahd International Stadium, Riyadh | Kuwait | 3–0 | 3–0 | 2006 FIFA World Cup qualifier |
| 15. | 21 January 2006 | Prince Faisal bin Fahd Stadium, Riyadh | Finland | 1–1 | 1–1 | Friendly |
| 16. | 22 February 2006 | Althawra Sports City Stadium, Aden | Yemen | 2–0 | 4–0 | 2007 AFC Asian Cup qualifier |
| 17. | 22 February 2006 | Althawra Sports City Stadium, Aden | Yemen | 4–0 | 4–0 | 2007 AFC Asian Cup qualifier |
| 18. | 1 July 2007 | Jurong West Stadium, Singapore City | Oman | 1–0 | 1–1 | Friendly |
| 19. | 22 November 2010 | May 22 Stadium, Aden | Yemen | 2–0 | 4–0 | 20th Arabian Gulf Cup |

== Honours ==
Al-Hilal

- Saudi League: 2002, 2005, 2008, 2010, 2011, 2017, 2018, 2020
- Crown Prince Cup: 2000, 2003, 2005, 2006, 2008, 2009, 2010, 2011, 2012, 2013, 2016
- King Cup of Champions: 2015, 2017
- Saudi Super Cup: 2015, 2018
- Saudi Federation cup: 2000, 2005, 2006
- AFC Champions League: 2000, 2019
- Asian Cup Winners Cup: 2002
- Asian Super Cup: 2000
- Saudi Founder's Cup: 2000
- Arab Cup Winners' Cup: 2001
- Saudi-Egyptian Super Cup: 2001

Saudi Arabia

- Arabian Gulf Cup: 2003
- AFC Asian Cup runner-up: 2000

Individual

- Saudi Premier League top goalscorer: 2009–10 (12 goals)
- Asian Footballer of the Year nominee: 2006

== See also ==
- List of men's footballers with 100 or more international caps
- List of one-club men in association football
