= Mohammed Al-Shahrani (footballer, born 1982) =

Saudi Arabian footballer

Personal information
- Full name: Mohammed Al-Shahrani
- Date of birth: 25 May 1982 (age 44)
- Place of birth: Riyadh, Saudi Arabia
- Height: 1.78 m (5 ft 10 in)
- Position: Striker

Youth career
- Damac F.C.

Senior career*
Years	Team	Apps	(Gls)
? –2011	Al-Nassr		
2009–2010	→ Al-Ittifaq (loan)	5	(1)
2011	→ Al-Riyadh SC (loan)		
2011–2012	Al-Fateh SC	13	(1)
2012–2013	Hajer Club	12	(1)
2013–2014	Al-Diriyah Club		

International career
- Saudi Arabia
- * Club domestic league appearances and goals

Mohammed Al-Shahrani (Arabic: محمد الشهراني; born 25 May 1982) is a Saudi Arabian former footballer.
