= Abdullah Al-Garni =

Saudi Arabian footballer (born 1987)

Personal information
- Date of birth: 18 February 1987 (age 39)
- Place of birth: Sabt Alalaya, Asir Province, Saudi Arabia
- Height: 5 ft 11 in (1.80 m)
- Position: Central defender

Youth career
- –: Al-Zayton

Senior career*
Years	Team	Apps	(Gls)
2007–2008	Al-Zayton		
2008–2009	Abha	13	(0)
2009–2010	Al Nassr	19	(2)
2008–2009	Al-Qadisiyah FC	3	(0)
2009–2010	Al-Fateh SC	0	(0)
2008–2009	Al-Khaleej		
- * Club domestic league appearances and goals as of 01:34, 17 June 2010 (EST)

Abdullah Al-Garni (Arabic: عبد الله القرني; born 18 February 1987) is a Saudi Arabian footballer. He currently plays as a defender for Al-Nassr in the Saudi Professional League.

== Early club career ==
Al-Garni joined his birthplace football club Al-Zaytoon FC in Sabt Alalaya town. He first played as a defensive midfielder. At this time his team was competing the Saudi Arabian 3rd division league. After a while he decided to leave his hometown to complete his education in Aramco Institute. He was playing football non-professionally with colleagues in Aramco football team.

== Abha 2008/2009 ==
After Abha's promotion to the Saudi Professional League, Al-Garni went back to get closer to his hometown and signed a one-year contract with Abha. That is when he first played as a central defender under a supervision of the technical manager Mahdi Al-Ragdi. He made his debut with Abha against Al-Ittihad in the sixth round of the Saudi Professional League 2008–09. Since then, Al-Garni continued in Abha's line-up squad until ending the season with relegation to the Saudi First Division League.

== Al-Nassr 2009/2010 ==
As the previous technical manager, Edgardo Bauza, was looking for young defenders. He scouted Al-Garni and requested the youngster's service from Abha. Al-Nassr management signed, after a dramatic transfer, a five-year contract with Al-Garni, together with his Abha teammate Khaled Al-Zylaeei, starting from 15 July 2009

Al-Garni participated in a preparatory training camp in Barcelona, Spain, with the new Uruguayan manager, Jorge da Silva. However, Al-Garni was deemed not yet mature enough to assume the reserve position for his team. He played a couple of matches with Al-Nassr U-23 team, which is considered to be team B in some countries, where he scored the first goal with Al-Nassr against Al Shabab. In the ninth round of the Saudi Professional League, Al-Nassr played the worst 45 minutes against Al-Ahli from Jeddah when they received three goals ending the first half 3-0 for Al-Ahli. Al-Garni joined as a substitute at the beginning of the second half and Al-Nassr succeed to get to end up the tough match with a big draw 3-3. Since then, he kept his position in the team until the end of the season.

== International career ==
Al-Garni called up for the Saudi Arabia national team for the first time at the end of the season 2009–10 He suffered a knee injury during the training camp which was in Austria. He could not make his debut for the national team yet.
