= Majed Al-Marshedi =

Saudi Arabian footballer

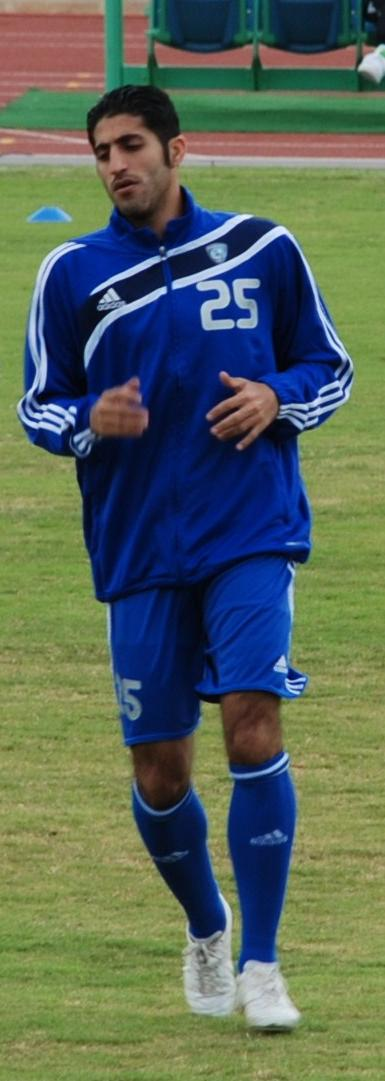

Personal information
- Full name: Majed Ahmed Al-Marshedi
- Date of birth: 1 November 1984 (age 41)
- Place of birth: Ha'il, Saudi Arabia
- Height: 1.86 m (6 ft 1 in)
- Position: Defender

Youth career
- Al-Lewaa

Senior career*
Years	Team	Apps	(Gls)
2003–2004	Al-Jabalain		
2004–2014	Al-Hilal	140	(5)
2006	→ Al-Wehda (loan)		
2014–2016	Al-Shabab	36	(0)
2016	Al-Fateh	4	(0)
2018–2019	Al-Jabalain	35	(1)

International career
2008–2014	Saudi Arabia	19	(0)
- * Club domestic league appearances and goals

Majed Al-Marshadi (Arabic: ماجد المرشدي; born 1 November 1984) is a footballer. He currently plays as a defender.

Al-Marshadi has made several appearances for the Saudi Arabia national football team, including two qualifying matches for the 2010 FIFA World Cup.

== Club career statistics ==
Club	Season	League		Cup		ACL		Total	
Club	Season	Apps	Goals	Apps	Goals	Apps	Goals	Apps	Goals
Al-Hilal	2004-05	7	0	3	0	2	0	12	0
Al-Hilal	2005-06	9	0	6	0	-	-	15	0
Al-Hilal	2006-07	16	1	9	1	2	0	27	2
Al-Hilal	2007-08	10	0	11	0	1	0	22	0
Al-Hilal	2008-09	17	1	10	0	7	0	34	1
Al-Hilal	2009-10	18	1	6	0	7	1	31	2
Total		77	3	45	1	19	1	141	5
