= Mohsen Al-Garni =

Saudi Arabian footballer

Personal information
- Full name: Mohsen Salem Al-Garni
- Date of birth: 1985 (age 40–41)
- Place of birth: riyad, Saudi Arabia
- Height: 1.80 m (5 ft 11 in)
- Position: Midfielder

Youth career
- Al-Nassr

Senior career*
Years	Team	Apps	(Gls)
?–present	Al-Nassr		
2008–2011	Al-Raed		
2011–2013	Al-Faisaly FC		
2013–2014	Al-Riyadh SC		
2014	Najran SC		
2014–2015	Al-Shoalah		
2015–2016	Al-Riyadh SC		
2016–2017	Al Kawkb		
2017–2018	Al-Diriyah		

International career
- Saudi Arabia
- * Club domestic league appearances and goals

Mohsen Al-Garni (also Mohsen Al-Qarni) is a midfielder in Saudi Arabia.

He played for all Al Nassr FC teams: under 17, under 20, under 23, and the first team.

He was a member of the Saudi football team under 23 years during the 2008 Summer Olympics qualifications.
