= Abdulatif Al-Ghanam =

Saudi Arabian footballer

Abdullatif Al Ghannam
Personal information
- Full name: Abdullatif Al Ghannam
- Date of birth: 16 July 1985 (age 41)
- Place of birth: Saudi Arabia
- Height: 1.81 m (5 ft 11 1/2 in)
- Position: Midfielder

Youth career
- 2001–2002: Al-Shabab

Senior career*
Years	Team	Apps	(Gls)
2002–2004	Al-Shabab		
2004–2015	Al-Hilal		

International career
2004–2015	Saudi Arabia		
- * Club domestic league appearances and goals

Abdulatif Al-Ghanam (Arabic: عبد اللطيف الغنام; born 16 July 1985) is a footballer.

== Club career ==
At the club level, he currently plays as a midfielder for Al-Hilal.

== International career ==
Al-Ghanam has also played several matches for the senior Saudi Arabia national football team, including two qualifying matches for the 2006 FIFA World Cup.

Al-Ghanam also participated in the 2003 FIFA World Youth Championship.
