= Saad Al Thyab =

Saudi Arabian footballer

Saad Al-Thyab
Personal information
- Full name: Saad Al-Thyab
- Date of birth: November 22, 1985 (age 40)
- Place of birth: Saudi Arabian
- Height: 1.74 m (5 ft 8 1/2 in)
- Position: Defender

Youth career
- 2001–2003: Al-Taraf

Senior career*
Years	Team	Apps	(Gls)
2003–2011	Al-Hilal		
2011–2013	Ettifaq FC	0	(0)
- * Club domestic league appearances and goals

Saad Al Thyab (Arabic سعد الذياب, born 22 November 1985) is a Saudi Arabian football player who currently plays as a defender for Al-Hilal.
