= Mohammad Al-Anbar =

Saudi Arabian footballer

Mohammed Al-Anber
Personal information
- Full name: Mohammed Saad Zaid Al-Anbar
- Date of birth: 22 March 1985 (age 41)
- Place of birth: Riyadh, Saudi Arabia
- Height: 1.86 m (6 ft 1 in)
- Position: Striker

Youth career
- 2000–2003: Al-Sadd
- 2003–2005: Al-Hilal

Senior career*
Years	Team	Apps	(Gls)
2004–2010	Al-Hilal	60	(48)
2010–2011	Al-Hazem	5	(1)
2011	Al-Riyadh	0	(0)
2011–2012	Al-Shoulla	0	(0)

International career
2005–2006	Saudi Arabia	9	(3)
- * Club domestic league appearances and goals

Mohammad Al-Anbar (Arabic: محمد العنبر; born 22 March 1985) is a Saudi Arabian association football player who plays as a center-forward for Al-Shoalah.

He played for Al Hilal in the 2009 AFC Champions League group stages.

He has several caps for the Saudi Arabia national team, including a 2006 FIFA World Cup qualifying match.
