= Rashed Al-Raheeb =

Saudi Arabian footballer

Personal information
- Full name: Rashed Abdulrahman Rashed Al-Raheeb
- Date of birth: March 2, 1984 (age 42)
- Place of birth: Dammam, Saudi Arabia
- Height: 1.77 m (5 ft 9 1/2 in)
- Position: Right back

Senior career*
Years	Team	Apps	(Gls)
2002–2009	Al-Ettifaq		
2009–2010	Al-Ittihad	15	(0)
2010–2012	Al-Ettifaq	9	(0)
2011	→ Al-Ittihad (loan)	11	(0)
2011–2015	Al-Ittihad	40	(0)
2015–2016	Hajer	22	(0)
2016–2017	Al-Khaleej	1	(0)
2018–2019	Jeddah	30	(0)
2019–2020	Al-Ain	23	(0)
2020–2021	Ohod	12	(0)
2021	Al-Tai	17	(0)
2021–2022	Al-Bukiryah		
2022–2023	Al-Jubail		

International career^{‡}
2008–2011	Saudi Arabia	13	(0)
- * Club domestic league appearances and goals as of 20 September 2020 ‡ National team caps and goals as of 26 January 2017

Rashed Al-Raheeb (Arabic: راشد الرهيب) is a Saudi Arabian footballer who currently plays as a right back. Al-Raheeb is a right back, more specifically he is a full-back that prefers to play on the right side.
