= Meshal Al-Mouri =

Saudi Arabian footballer

Personal information
- Full name: Meshal Al-Mouri
- Date of birth: May 1, 1987 (age 39)
- Place of birth: Saudi Arabia
- Height: 1.80 m (5 ft 11 in)
- Position: Midfielder

Senior career*
| Years | Team | Apps | (Gls) |
| ?–2008 | Al-Hilal | ? | (?) |
| 2008–2009 | → Al Hazm (loan) | ? | (?) |
| 2009–2010 | → Al-Khaleej (loan) | ? | (?) |
| 2010–? | → Al-Riyadh (loan) | ? | (?) |
| 201?– | Al-Nahdha | ? | (?) |
| 2012–2014 | Al-Shoalah | 15 | (0) |
| 2014–2015 | Al-Feiha FC | | |
- * Club domestic league appearances and goals

Meshal Al-Mouri is a Saudi Arabian football player.
