= Hassan Khairat =

Saudi Arabian footballer

Personal information
- Full name: Hassan Khairat
- Date of birth: November 13, 1987 (age 38)
- Height: 1.81 m (5 ft 11 1/2 in)
- Position: Defender

Youth career
- 2001–2008: Al-Hilal

Senior career*
Years	Team	Apps	(Gls)
2008–2013	Al-Hilal	25	(0)
2013	Al-Raed	0	(0)
2014	Al-Ettifaq	0	(0)
2015	Al-Kawkab		
- * Club domestic league appearances and goals

Hassan Khairat (Arabic: حسن خيرات; born 13 November 1987) is a football player.
