= Marcelo Camacho =

Brazilian footballer

Personal information
- Full name: Marcelo Ramiro Camacho
- Date of birth: 24 March 1980 (age 46)
- Place of birth: Rio de Janeiro, Brazil
- Height: 1.70 m (5 ft 7 in)
- Position: Midfielder

Team information
- Current team: Madureira
- Number: 88

Youth career
- CFZ

Senior career*
Years	Team	Apps	(Gls)
2000	CFZ		
2000	→ Grêmio (loan)	6	(0)
2001	Bangu	27	(0)
2001–2002	CFZ	14	(0)
2003–2004	Botafogo	11	(0)
2004–2006	Al-Hilal	74	(23)
2006–2007	Al-Arabi	41	(8)
2007–2011	Al-Shabab	98	(28)
2011–2012	Al-Ahli	24	(6)
2012–2013	Al-Shabab	25	(6)
2013	Vitória	7	(0)
2013–2014	Al-Sailiya	11	(4)
2015–	Madureira		
- * Club domestic league appearances and goals as of 8 April 2014

Marcelo Ramiro Camacho, or simply Marcelo Camacho (born March 24, 1980, in Rio de Janeiro) is a Brazilian footballer who plays for Madureira.

== Career ==
His previous clubs include Grêmio, Bangu, CFZ, Botafogo and Vitória of Brazil, Saudi clubs Al-Hilal, Al-Shabab and Al-Ahli, and Al-Arabi of Qatar.

Camacho distinguished himself in Brazilian football in 2003, when he operated in the Botafogo and helped the team climb back into the First Division Championship. In the penultimate game of the square end of the Series B, Camacho scored two goals in the victory of Alvinegro by 3 to 1 on Marilia, the game that sealed the access of the club. After a period ranging from the reserve team, was traded in 2005 for the Arab football.

== Club career statistics ==
Club	Season	League		Crown Prince Cup		King Cup		ACL		Other		Total	
Club	Season	Apps	Goals	Apps	Goals	Apps	Goals	Apps	Goals	Apps	Goals	Apps	Goals
Al-Ahli (Jeddah)
Al-Ahli (Jeddah)	2011–12	24	6	3	0	4	0	6	1	4	2	37	9
Al-Ahli (Jeddah)	Total	24	6	3	0	4	0	6	1	4	2	37	9
Al-Shabab (Riyadh)
Al-Shabab (Riyadh)	2012–13	25	6	1	1	5	0	7	0	-	-	38	7
Al-Shabab (Riyadh)	Total	25	6	1	1	5	0	7	0	-	-	38	7

== Honours ==
Al-Hilal FC

- Saudi Premier League: 2004-05
- Crown Prince Cup: 2005 2006

Al-Shabab KSA

- Saudi Champions Cup: 2008
- Saudi Champions Cup: 2009

Al-Ahli

- Saudi Champions Cup: 2012

Madureira

- Taça Rio: 2015
