= Ahmed Al-Swaileh =

Saudi Arabian footballer

Ahmed Al Swaileh
Personal information
- Full name: Ahmed Mohamed Al Swaileh
- Date of birth: 14 May 1986 (age 40)
- Place of birth: Al-Hasa, Saudi Arabia
- Height: 1.75 m (5 ft 9 in)
- Position: Striker

Youth career
- 2000–2003: Al Fateh
- 2003–2004: Al-Hilal

Senior career*
Years	Team	Apps	(Gls)
2004–2006	Al-Hilal	25	(20)
2006	FC Red Bull Salzburg	?	(?)
2007–2010	Al-Hilal	42	(17)
2010–2011	Al-Qadisiyah	10	(3)
2011–2012	Hajer	1	(0)

International career
2001–2003	Saudi Arabia -17		
2003–2004	Saudi Arabia -20		
2005–2010	Saudi Arabia	8	(4)
- * Club domestic league appearances and goals as of 00:31, 24 November 2011 (UTC)

Ahmed Al Swaileh (Arabic: أحمد الصويلح; born 14 May 1986) is a Saudi Arabian football player for Hajer Club. A quick and strong striker, he was the second striker of Al-Hilal behind the super star Yasser Al-Qahtani.

Al Swaileh has made several appearances for the Saudi Arabia national football team, including a 2006 FIFA World Cup qualifying match.

He also played for Saudi Arabia at the 2003 FIFA World Youth Championship in the United Arab Emirates.
