= Mohammad Nami =

Saudi Arabian footballer

Mohammed Nami
Personal information
- Full name: Mohammed Saleh Nami Al-Nakhli
- Date of birth: 2 November 1983 (age 42)
- Place of birth: Medina, Saudi Arabia
- Height: 1.74 m (5 ft 8 1/2 in)
- Position: Right-back

Youth career
- 2002–2003: Al-Ansar

Senior career*
Years	Team	Apps	(Gls)
2003–2007	Al-Ansar		
2007–2013	Al-Hilal	64	(2)
2013–2014	Al-Fateh	6	(0)
2014–2016	Al-Ansar		

International career
2009–2010	Saudi Arabia	4	(0)
- * Club domestic league appearances and goals

Mohammad Nami (Arabic: محمد نامي) is a Saudi Arabian retired professional footballer who played as a right-back. He played most of his career for Al-Ansar and Al-Hilal with a brief spell with Al-Fateh. He is a former Saudi Arabian international.
