= 2016–17 Al-Nassr FC season =

Al-Nassr
2016–17 season
- President: Faisal bin Turki
- Manager: Zoran Mamić
- Stadium: King Fahd Stadium; Faisal bin Fahd Stadium
- SPL: 3rd
- Crown Prince Cup: Runners-up
- King Cup: Quarter-finals
- Top goalscorer: League: Hassan Al-Raheb (9); All: Hassan Al-Raheb (12)
- Highest home attendance: 27,181 vs Al-Hilal (16 December 2016)
- Lowest home attendance: 1,422 vs Al-Taawoun (15 April 2017)
- Average home league attendance: 7,635
Home colours	Away colours
- All statistics correct as of 4 May 2017.

The 2016–17 season was Al-Nassr Football Club's 62nd in existence and 41st consecutive season in Pro League, the top flight of Saudi Arabian football. Along with Pro League, Al-Nassr competed in the Crown Prince Cup and King Cup.

== Players ==
=== Squad information ===
As of 31 January 2017

Note: Flags indicate national team as defined under FIFA eligibility rules; some limited exceptions apply. Players may hold more than one non-FIFA nationality.

No.	Pos.	Nation	Player
1	GK	KSA	Abdullah Al-Shammeri
2	DF	BRA	Bruno Uvini
3	DF	KSA	Abdullah Madu
4	DF	KSA	Omar Hawsawi
5	DF	CRO	Ivan Tomečak
6	MF	KSA	Sami Al-Najei
8	MF	KSA	Yahya Al-Shehri
9	FW	KSA	Naif Hazazi
10	FW	KSA	Mohammed Al Sahlawi
11	MF	CRO	Marin Tomasov (on loan from Rijeka)
12	DF	KSA	Khalid Al-Ghamdi
13	DF	KSA	Mohamed Eid
14	MF	KSA	Ibrahim Ghaleb
15	MF	KSA	Ahmed Al-Fraidi

No.	Pos.	Nation	Player
16	MF	KSA	Abdulaziz Al-Jebreen
18	MF	KSA	Abdulellah Al-Nassar
20	MF	PAR	Víctor Ayala
22	GK	KSA	Abdullah Al-Enezi
23	GK	KSA	Hussain Shae'an
24	DF	KSA	Hussein Abdulghani (Captain)
26	MF	KSA	Shaya Sharahili
27	MF	KSA	Awadh Khamis
28	DF	KSA	Ahmad Akash
33	GK	KSA	Waleed Abdullah
34	DF	KSA	Ali Al-Khaibari
39	MF	KSA	Abdurahman Al-Dossari
40	DF	KSA	Muteb Al-Mutlaq
99	FW	KSA	Hassan Al-Raheb

== Pre-season friendlies ==
12 July 2016 Friendly	Volyn Lutsk (Ukraine)	3–1	(Saudi Arabia) Al-Nassr FC	Sveti Martin na Muri, Croatia
19:00 EEST (UTC+03:00)		Report		Stadium: SPA Golfer hotel

== Competitions ==
=== Overall ===
Competition	Started round	Current position / round	Final position / round	First match	Last match
Professional League	—	—	3rd	12 August 2016	4 May 2017
Crown Prince Cup	Round of 32	—	Runners-up	16 August 2016	10 March 2017
King Cup	Round of 32	—	Quarter-finals	21 January 2017	1 April 2017

Last Updated: 4 May 2017

=== Pro League ===
==== League table ====
Pos	Team	Pld	W	D	L	GF	GA	GD	Pts	Qualification or relegation
1	Al-Hilal (C)	26	21	3	2	63	16	+47	66	Qualification to AFC Champions League group stage
2	Al-Ahli	26	17	4	5	57	30	+27	55	Qualification to AFC Champions League group stage
3	Al-Nassr	26	16	4	6	44	25	+19	52 (Note: Al-Nassr finished ahead of Al-Ittihad on head-to-head points: Al-Ittihad 0–1 Al-Nassr, Al-Nassr 1–1 Al-Ittihad)	
4	Al-Ittihad (Note: Al-Ittihad were docked 3 points for failing to pay over debts.)	26	17	4	5	57	37	+20	52	
5	Al-Raed	26	11	2	13	37	47	−10	35	

Updated to match(es) played on 4 May 2017. Source: slstat.com
Rules for classification: 1) Points; 2) Head-to-head points; 3) Head-to-head goal difference; 4) Total goal difference; 5) Total goals scored; 6) Play-off (only for deciding champion, relegation and AFC competitions participation).
(C) Champions

==== Results summary ====
Overall								Home						Away					
Pld	W	D	L	GF	GA	GD	Pts	W	D	L	GF	GA	GD	W	D	L	GF	GA	GD
26	16	4	6	44	25	+19	52	9	3	1	22	7	+15	7	1	5	22	18	+4

Last updated: 4 May 2017.
Source: Competitive matches

==== Results by round ====
Round	1	2	3	4	5	6	7	8	9	10	11	12	13	14	15	16	17	18	19	20	21	22	23	24	25	26
Ground	H	A	H	H	A	H	A	H	A	A	H	A	H	A	H	A	A	H	A	H	A	H	H	A	H	A
Result	W	L	W	L	W	W	W	W	W	L	W	D	D	W	W	L	W	W	W	D	W	D	W	L	W	L
Position	2	8	5	6	4	4	4	4	4	4	4	4	4	4	2	2	2	2	2	2	2	2	2	3	3	3

Updated to match(es) played on 4 May 2017. Source: Competitive matches
A = Away; H = Home; W = Win; D = Draw; L = Loss

==== Matches ====
All times are local, AST (UTC+3).

Win Draw Loss Postponed

12 August 2016 1	Al-Nassr	4–1	Al-Fateh	Riyadh
21:05	Sufyani 33'; Abousaban 41' (o.g.); Hawsawi 61'; S. Sharahili 81'	Report	Al-Fuhaid (yellow card) 10'; Al-Bulaihi (yellow card) 22'; Nathan 80'; Buhimed (yellow card) 86'	Stadium: King Fahd International Stadium; Attendance: 11,264; Referee: Turki Al-Khudhayr

20 August 2016 2	Al-Ettifaq	1–0	Al-Nassr	Dammam
21:05	Leo 23'; Fofana (yellow card) 35'; Otain (yellow card) 41'; Al-Zaqaan (yellow card) 79'	Report	Hawsawi (yellow card) 52'	Stadium: Prince Mohamed bin Fahd Stadium; Attendance: 7,450; Referee: Mohammed Al-Qarni

17 September 2016 3	Al-Nassr	1–0	Al-Qadisiyah	Riyadh
20:45	Sharahili (yellow card) 54'; Ayala 60'	Report	Al-Khabrani (yellow card) 43'; Masrahi (yellow card) 63'; Jaafari (yellow card) 73'	Stadium: King Fahd International Stadium; Attendance: 2,689; Referee: Fahad Al-Mirdasi

22 September 2016 4	Al-Nassr	0–1	Al-Khaleej	Riyadh
20:00		Report	François (yellow card) 47'; Jandson 56'	Stadium: Prince Faisal bin Fahd Stadium; Attendance: 4,438; Referee: Abdulrahman Al-Sultan

15 October 2016 5	Al-Wehda	0–3	Al-Nassr	Makkah
20:00		Report	Tomečak 40'; Tomasov 45+2'; Shae'an (yellow card) 52'; Al-Sahlawi 89'	Stadium: King Abdul Aziz Stadium; Attendance: 2,275; Referee: Khaled Salwi

21 October 2016 6	Al-Nassr	1–0	Al-Ahli	Riyadh
21:15	Al-Jebreen (yellow card) 42'; Ayala 84', (yellow card) 85'; Al-Fraidi (yellow card) 90'	Report	Al-Mosailem (yellow card) 9'; Al-Fatil (yellow card) 83'	Stadium: King Fahd International Stadium; Attendance: 16,501; Referee: Viktor Kassai (Hungary)

29 October 2016 7	Al-Faisaly	1–2	Al-Nassr	Al Majma'ah
20:50	Luisinho 13' (yellow card) 23'; Abdulaziz (yellow card) 25'; Al-Muwallad (yellow card) 41'; Everaldo (yellow card) 61'; Al-Mutairi (yellow card) 90'	Report	Tomečak 22'; Hazazi 45+1'; Abdulghani (yellow card) 90+2'	Stadium: King Salman Sport City Stadium; Attendance: 1,629; Referee: Mishari Al-Mishari

3 November 2016 8	Al-Nassr	3–1	Al-Raed	Riyadh
19:50	Al-Sahlawi 50', 62', (yellow card) 53'; Ayala 58', (yellow card) 67'; Tomasov (yellow card) 77'	Report	Bangoura 35'; Ftyani (yellow card) 36'; Al-Bishi (yellow card) 45+4' (yellow-red card) 90+4'; Al-Showaish (yellow card) 85'; Al-Habib (yellow card) 90+1'	Stadium: Prince Faisal bin Fahd Stadium; Attendance: 5,195; Referee: Khaled Al-Sinany

20 November 2016 9	Ittihad FC	0–1	Al-Nassr	Jeddah
19:55	Al-Aryani (yellow card) 43'; Assiri (yellow card) 88'; Al-Sumairi (yellow card) 90+4'	Report	Ayala 13'; Al-Najei (yellow card) 90+4'	Stadium: King Abdullah Sports City; Attendance: 23,038; Referee: Damir Skomina (Slovenia)

25 November 2016 10	Al-Taawoun	2–1	Al-Nassr	Buraidah
17:50	El Hamdaoui 30'; Al-Dossari 32'; Al-Sharid (yellow card) 35'; Al-Barakah (yellow card) 79'	Report	Al-Raheb 78'; Tomasov (yellow card) 81'; Ayala (yellow card) 83'	Stadium: King Abdullah Sport City Stadium; Attendance: 5,013; Referee: Sultan Al-Harbi

1 December 2016 11	Al-Nassr	4–0	Al-Batin	Riyadh
19:40	Al-Raheb 13', 22', (yellow card) 17'; Akash 35' (pen.); Hawsawi (yellow card) 46'; Al-Sahlawi 83'	Report	Fané (yellow card) 53'	Stadium: Prince Faisal bin Fahd Stadium; Attendance: 4,431; Referee: Shukri Al-Hanfosh

9 December 2016 12	Al-Shabab	1–1	Al-Nassr	Riyadh
19:55	Kariri (yellow card) 3'; Heberty 26' (pen.); Al-Sobeai (yellow card) 55'	Report	Shae'an (yellow card) 24'; Al-Raheb (yellow card) 28', (goal) 41'; Al-Fraidi (yellow card) 31'	Stadium: King Fahd International Stadium; Attendance: 8,175; Referee: Khaled Salwi

16 December 2016 13	Al-Nassr	1–1	Al-Hilal	Riyadh
20:00	Tomasov 33'; Sharahili (yellow card) 39'; Tomečak (yellow card) 45+1'; Ayala (yellow card) 76'	Report	Al-Breik 16'; Al-Abed (yellow card) 30'; Al-Hafith (yellow card) 40'; Al-Khaibri (yellow card) 81'	Stadium: King Fahd International Stadium; Attendance: 27,181; Referee: Milorad Mažić (Serbia)

21 December 2016 14	Al-Fateh	1–2	Al-Nassr	Al-Hasa
19:45	Sharahili (yellow card) 45+1'; Al-Ghamdi (yellow card) 48'; Al-Najei 53'; Al-Shehri 61'; Tomasov (yellow card) 83'	Report	Nathan 13' (pen.); Al-Bulaihi (yellow card) 60'; Al-Owaishir (yellow card) 83'	Stadium: Prince Abdullah bin Jalawi Stadium; Attendance: 3,714; Referee: Fahad Al-Mirdasi

1 January 2017 15	Al-Nassr	2–0	Al-Ettifaq	Riyadh
19:50	Al-Raheb 65', 88', (yellow card) 89'; Al-Sahlawi (yellow card) 85'	Report	Al-Habib (yellow card) 48'; Al-Nashi (yellow card) 59'; Otain (yellow card) 61'; Al-Hazaa (yellow card) 84'	Stadium: Prince Faisal bin Fahd Stadium; Attendance: 4,638; Referee: Gediminas Mažeika (Lithuania)

26 January 2017 16	Al-Qadisiyah	3–2	Al-Nassr	Khobar
20:15	Bismark 34'; Al-Sobhi 42'; Al-Amri 50'; Wahib (yellow card) 82'	Report	Al-Sahlawi 13'; Eid (yellow card) 32', (goal) 55'; Al-Fraidi (yellow card) 74'	Stadium: Prince Saud bin Jalawi Stadium; Attendance: 4,022; Referee: Mohammed Al-Hoaish

4 February 2017 17	Al-Khaleej	0–3	Al-Nassr	Dammam
20:20	Al-Ghamdi (yellow card) 19'	Report	Lajami 22' (o.g.); Al-Sahlawi 39'; Tomasov 90+2' (pen.)	Stadium: Prince Mohamed bin Fahd Stadium; Attendance: 1,682; Referee: Khaled Al-Teris

10 February 2017 18	Al-Nassr	2–1	Al-Wehda	Riyadh
20:15	Madu 80'; Al-Fraidi 89'	Report	Fallatah 65'	Stadium: King Fahd International Stadium; Attendance: 3,506; Referee: Fahad Al-Mirdasi

17 February 2017 19	Al-Ahli	0–2	Al-Nassr	Jeddah
20:25	Al-Fatil (yellow card) 46'; Al-Robeai (yellow card) 51'; Abdul-Amir (red card) 72'; Al-Mowalad (yellow card) 78'	Report	Al-Fraidi (yellow card) 5'; Al-Ghamdi (yellow card) 42'; Al-Shehri 45+1'; Ghaleb (yellow card) 53'; Al-Dossari (yellow card) 66'; Hazazi 90+3' (pen.)	Stadium: King Abdullah Sports City; Attendance: 38,355; Referee: Artur Dias (Portugal)

3 March 2017 20	Al-Nassr	0–0	Al-Faisaly	Riyadh
20:30	Hawsawi (yellow card) 27'; Al-Ghamdi (yellow card) 66'	Report	Abdulaziz (yellow card) 28'; Al-Bishi (yellow card) 45'	Stadium: Prince Faisal bin Fahd Stadium; Attendance: 11,883; Referee: Turki Al-Khudair

14 March 2017 21	Al-Raed	0–1	Al-Nassr	Buraidah
20:35	Bangoura (yellow card) 45'; Al-Habib (yellow card) 45+2'; Al-Bishi (yellow card) 45+3'; Al-Showaish (yellow card) 90+3'	Report	Al-Raheb (yellow card) 28'; Hazazi 44' (pen.); Al-Najei (yellow card) 45+4'; Abdulghani (yellow card) 90+2'	Stadium: King Abdullah Sport City Stadium; Attendance: 7,893; Referee: Milorad Mažić (Serbia)

7 April 2017 22	Al-Nassr	1–1	Al-Ittihad	Riyadh
20:40	Ghaleb (yellow card) 52'; Ayala (yellow card) 67'; Waleed Abdullah (yellow card) 83'; Bruno Uvini (yellow card) 83'; Al-Raheb 90', (yellow card) 90+4'	Report	Kahraba 18'; Al-Ansari (yellow card) 38'	Stadium: King Fahd International Stadium; Attendance: 4,652; Referee: Mohammed Al-Hoaish

15 April 2017 23	Al-Nassr	2–1	Al-Taawoun	Riyadh
20:45	Ayala (yellow card) 28', (goal) 50'; Al-Sahlawi 63'	Report	Al-Saiari 16'; Al-Barakah (yellow card) 34'; Kanno (yellow card) 78'	Stadium: Prince Faisal bin Fahd Stadium; Attendance: 1,422; Referee: Mohammed Al-Qarni

21 April 2017 24	Al-Batin	4–3	Al-Nassr	Hafar al-Batin
19:05	Jhonnattann 30', 78'; Jorge Santos 61', 73', (yellow card) 74'; Nasser (yellow card) 62'	Report	Al-Raheb 17', 22'; Tomečak (yellow card) 25'; Al-Sahlawi 90+5'	Stadium: Al-Batin Club Stadium; Attendance: 2,320; Referee: Sultan Al-Harbi

29 April 2017 25	Al-Nassr	1–0	Al-Shabab	Riyadh
20:50	Ayala 77'; Al-Sahlawi (yellow card) 84'	Report	Bahebri (yellow card) 61'; Al-Sobeai (yellow card) 64'; Al-Qeed (yellow card) 79'	Stadium: King Fahd International Stadium; Attendance: 1,458; Referee: Khaled Al-Teris

4 May 2017 26	Al-Hilal	5–1	Al-Nassr	Riyadh
20:50	Al-Abed 28'; Kharbin (yellow card) 34', (goal) 45', 67', 71'; Carlos Eduardo 45+1'	Report	Tomasov 42'; Sharahili (yellow card) 43'	Stadium: King Fahd International Stadium; Attendance: 59,174; Referee: Milorad Mažić (Serbia)

=== Crown Prince Cup ===
All times are local, AST (UTC+3).

16 August 2016 Round of 32	Al-Nassr	3–0	Al-Nojoom	Riyadh
20:55	Al-Raheb 38', 65'; Akash 41'; Al-Khaibari (red card) 55'; Khamis (yellow card) 90+1'		Al-Eisa (yellow card) 41'	Stadium: King Fahd International Stadium; Referee: Abdulrahman Al-Shehri

27 September 2016 Round of 16	Al-Watani	1–3	Al-Nassr	Tabuk
19:05	Dosh (yellow card) 23'; Sharifi (yellow card) 30'; Al-Yamani 53'		Sufyani 9'; Uvini 33'; Al-Raheb 90+1'	Stadium: King Khalid Sport City Stadium; Referee: Shukri Al-Hunfush

25 October 2016 Quarter-finals	Al-Nassr	1–0	Al-Wehda	Riyadh
20:00	Al-Sahlawi 39'; Eid (yellow card) 55'		Al-Shahrani (yellow card) 38'; Al-Dossari (yellow card) 69'	Stadium: King Fahd International Stadium; Referee: Khaled Al-Teris

26 December 2016 Semi-finals	Al-Hilal	0–2	Al-Nassr	Riyadh
19:50	Al-Faraj (yellow card) 32' (yellow-red card) 90+4'; Milesi (yellow card) 32'; Al-Hafith (yellow card) 79'	Report	Al-Ghamdi (yellow card) 9'; Al-Fraidi (yellow card) 20'; Al-Sahlawi 26' (pen.); Tomasov 40'; Sharahili (yellow card) 90'	Stadium: King Fahd International Stadium; Referee: Turki Al Khudair

10 March 2017 Final	Al-Ittihad	1–0	Al-Nassr	Riyadh
20:35	Kahraba 16'; Fallatah (yellow card) 56'; Khrees (yellow card) 74'; Akaïchi (yellow card) 90+4'	Report	Hawsawi (yellow card) 67'; Uvini (yellow card) 90+5'	Stadium: King Fahd International Stadium; Attendance: 57,584; Referee: Mark Clattenburg (England)

=== King Cup ===
21 January 2017 Round of 32	Al-Nassr	4–0	Al-Feiha	Riyadh
18:10	Al-Ghamdi 15'; Tomečak 45+2'; Al-Najei 72'; Al-Sahlawi 90+1'	Report	Al-Khaibari (yellow card) 90'	Stadium: Prince Faisal bin Fahd Stadium; Referee: Raed Al-Zahrani

23 February 2017 Round of 16	Al-Nahda	0–2	Al-Nassr	Dammam
19:55	Al-Dhamri (yellow card) 37'; Sufyani (yellow card) 55'; Al-Ziyadi (yellow card) 90'; Al-Olayani (red card) 108'	Report	Ghaleb (yellow card) 79'; Hazazi 93', 97' (pen.), (yellow card) 110'	Stadium: Prince Mohamed bin Fahd Stadium; Referee: Faisal Al-Balawi

1 April 2017 Quarter-finals	Al-Nassr	0–2	Al-Hilal	Riyadh
20:30	Ghaleb (yellow card) 54'	Report	Jahfali (yellow card) 24'; Milesi 80', (yellow card) 81'; Kharbin 90+1'	Stadium: King Fahd International Stadium; Attendance: 18,906; Referee: Damir Skomina (Slovenia)

== Statistics ==
=== Squad statistics ===
As of 4 May 2017.

No.	Pos	Nat	Player	Total		Pro League		King Cup		Crown Prince Cup	
No.	Pos	Nat	Player	Apps	Goals	Apps	Goals	Apps	Goals	Apps	Goals
1	GK	(Saudi Arabia)	Abdullah Al-Shammeri	0	0	0	0	0	0	0	0
2	DF	(Brazil)	Bruno Uvini	22	1	18	0	1	0	3	1
3	DF	(Saudi Arabia)	Abdullah Madu	15	1	8+2	1	3	0	1+1	0
4	DF	(Saudi Arabia)	Omar Hawsawi	30	1	23	1	3	0	3+1	0
5	DF	(Croatia)	Ivan Tomečak	30	3	24+2	2	2	1	0+2	0
6	MF	(Saudi Arabia)	Sami Al-Najei	12	2	5+4	1	0+1	1	1+1	0
7	MF	(Saudi Arabia)	Rabee Sufyani*	9	2	3+3	1	0	0	3	1
8	MF	(Saudi Arabia)	Yahya Al-Shehri	28	2	17+6	2	2	0	3	0
9	FW	(Saudi Arabia)	Naif Hazazi	19	5	8+7	3	1+1	2	1+1	0
10	FW	(Saudi Arabia)	Mohammed Al Sahlawi	27	11	14+7	8	2+1	1	3	2
11	MF	(Croatia)	Marin Tomasov	31	5	21+2	4	2+1	0	2+3	1
12	DF	(Saudi Arabia)	Khalid Al-Ghamdi	31	1	24	0	3	1	4	0
13	DF	(Saudi Arabia)	Mohamed Eid	6	1	3+1	1	0	0	2	0
14	MF	(Saudi Arabia)	Ibrahim Ghaleb	15	0	8+2	0	3	0	2	0
15	MF	(Saudi Arabia)	Ahmed Al-Fraidi	21	1	10+5	1	2	0	3+1	0
16	MF	(Saudi Arabia)	Abdulaziz Al-Jebreen	7	0	5+1	0	0	0	1	0
17	MF	(Saudi Arabia)	Issam Al-Qarni*	1	0	0	0	0	0	1	0
18	MF	(Saudi Arabia)	Abdulellah Al-Nassar	2	0	0	0	0+1	0	0+1	0
19	DF	(Saudi Arabia)	Hamad Al-Aqeeli	0	0	0	0	0	0	0	0
20	MF	(Paraguay)	Víctor Ayala	23	6	15+5	6	1	0	2	0
22	GK	(Saudi Arabia)	Abdullah Al-Enezi	8	0	7	0	0	0	1	0
23	GK	(Saudi Arabia)	Hussain Shae'an	18	0	12	0	2	0	4	0
24	DF	(Saudi Arabia)	Hussein Abdulghani	12	0	8	0	0+1	0	3	0
25	FW	(Saudi Arabia)	Saad Al-Shammeri	0	0	0	0	0	0	0	0
26	MF	(Saudi Arabia)	Shaye Sharahili	24	1	12+7	1	1	0	3+1	0
27	MF	(Saudi Arabia)	Awadh Khamis	24	0	14+3	0	1+2	0	4	0
28	DF	(Saudi Arabia)	Ahmad Akash	10	2	6+2	1	1	0	1	1
33	GK	(Saudi Arabia)	Waleed Abdullah	8	0	7	0	1	0	0	0
34	DF	(Saudi Arabia)	Ali Al-Khaibari	1	0	0	0	0	0	1	0
39	MF	(Saudi Arabia)	Abdurahman Al-Dossari	13	0	6+5	0	1	0	1	0
44	MF	(Saudi Arabia)	Nawaf Al-Shenashini	1	0	0+1	0	0	0	0	0
55	FW	(Saudi Arabia)	Firas Al-Buraikan	0	0	0	0	0	0	0	0
66	FW	(Saudi Arabia)	Muteb Al-Hammad	1	0	0+1	0	0	0	0	0
99	FW	(Saudi Arabia)	Hassan Al-Raheb	23	12	8+9	9	1+1	0	2+2	3

=== Goalscorers ===
Rank	No.	Pos	Nat	Name	Pro League	King Cup	Crown Prince Cup	Total
1	99	FW	(Saudi Arabia)	Hassan Al-Raheb	9	0	3	12
2	10	FW	(Saudi Arabia)	Mohammed Al-Sahlawi	8	1	2	11
3	20	MF	(Paraguay)	Víctor Ayala	6	0	0	6
4	9	FW	(Saudi Arabia)	Naif Hazazi	3	2	0	5
4	11	MF	(Croatia)	Marin Tomasov	4	0	1	5
6	5	DF	(Croatia)	Ivan Tomečak	2	1	0	3
7	6	MF	(Saudi Arabia)	Sami Al-Najei	1	1	0	2
7	7	FW	(Saudi Arabia)	Rabee Sufyani	1	0	1	2
7	8	MF	(Saudi Arabia)	Yahya Al-Shehri	2	0	0	2
7	28	DF	(Saudi Arabia)	Ahmad Akash	1	0	1	2
11	2	DF	(Brazil)	Bruno Uvini	0	0	1	1
11	3	DF	(Saudi Arabia)	Abdullah Madu	1	0	0	1
11	4	DF	(Saudi Arabia)	Omar Hawsawi	1	0	0	1
11	12	DF	(Saudi Arabia)	Khalid Al-Ghamdi	0	1	0	1
11	13	DF	(Saudi Arabia)	Mohamed Eid	1	0	0	1
11	15	MF	(Saudi Arabia)	Ahmed Al-Fraidi	1	0	0	1
11	26	MF	(Saudi Arabia)	Shaye Sharahili	1	0	0	1
Own goal					2	0	0	2
Total					44	6	9	59

Last Updated: 4 May 2017

=== Clean sheets ===
Rank	No.	Pos	Nat	Name	League	Crown Prince Cup	King Cup	Total
1	23	GK	(Saudi Arabia)	Hussain Shae'an	5	2	3	10
2	22	GK	(Saudi Arabia)	Abdullah Al-Enezi	3	0	0	3
2	33	GK	(Saudi Arabia)	Waleed Abdullah	3	0	0	3
Total					11	2	3	16

Last Updated: 4 May 2017
