= 2018–19 Al-Nassr FC season =

Al-Nassr
2018–19 season
- President: Saud Al-Suwailem
- Manager: José Daniel Carreño (until 10 November); Rui Vitória (from 10 January)
- Stadium: King Fahd International Stadium; Prince Faisal bin Fahd Stadium
- Pro League: 1st
- King's Cup: Semi-finals
- AFC Champions League: Round of 16
- Arab Club Champions Cup: Round of 16
- Top goalscorer: League: Abderrazak Hamdallah (34 goals); All: Abderrazak Hamdallah (52 goals)
- Highest home attendance: 59,174 vs Al-Batin
- Lowest home attendance: 3,039 vs Ohod
- Average home league attendance: 16,408
Home colours	Away colours	Third colours
- All statistics correct as of 29 May 2019.

The 2018–19 season was Al-Nassr's 43rd consecutive season in the top flight of Saudi football and 63rd year in existence as a football club. Along with the Pro League, the club competed in the King's Cup, Arab Club Champions Cup, and the Champions League. The season covers the period from 1 July 2018 to 30 June 2019.

Al-Nassr won their ninth Pro League title on 16 May 2019 following a 2–1 home win over Al-Batin.

== Players ==
=== Squad information ===
As of 7 February 2019

Note: Flags indicate national team as defined under FIFA eligibility rules; some limited exceptions apply. Players may hold more than one non-FIFA nationality.

No.	Pos.	Nation	Player
1	GK	AUS	Brad Jones
2	DF	KSA	Sultan Al-Ghanam
4	DF	KSA	Omar Hawsawi (captain)
5	DF	BRA	Bruno Uvini
6	MF	BRA	Petros
7	FW	NGA	Ahmed Musa
8	MF	KSA	Yahya Al-Shehri
9	FW	MAR	Abderrazak Hamdallah
10	FW	KSA	Mohammad Al-Sahlawi
11	MF	MAR	Nordin Amrabat
13	DF	KSA	Abdulrahman Al-Obaid
14	MF	KSA	Ibrahim Ghaleb
15	MF	KSA	Ahmed Al-Fraidi
16	MF	KSA	Abdulaziz Al-Jebreen
17	MF	KSA	Abdullah Al-Khaibari
18	DF	BRA	Maicon (on loan from Galatasaray)

No.	Pos.	Nation	Player
20	DF	KSA	Hamad Al Mansor
25	MF	KSA	Nawaf Al-Farshan
26	DF	KSA	Abdullah Madu
27	MF	KSA	Awadh Khamis
29	MF	KSA	Rakan Al-Shamlan
31	GK	KSA	Zaid Al-Bawardi
33	GK	KSA	Waleed Abdullah
36	FW	KSA	Khalil Al-Absi
37	DF	KSA	Naif Almas
38	MF	KSA	Fahad Al-Jumeiah
39	MF	KSA	Abdurahman Al-Dossari
42	FW	KSA	Firas Al-Buraikan
43	GK	KSA	Saleh Al Ohaymid
45	MF	KSA	Faraj Al-Ghushayan
71	MF	KSA	Abdullah Al Salem (on loan from Al-Fayha)
77	MF	BRA	Giuliano

== Transfers ==
=== In ===
Date	Pos.	Name	Previous club	Fee	Source
12 March 2018	DF	(Saudi Arabia) Hamad Al Mansor	(Saudi Arabia) Al-Faisaly	€700,000	
12 March 2018	DF	(Saudi Arabia) Sultan Al-Ghanam	(Saudi Arabia) Al-Faisaly	€1,400,000	
3 May 2018	GK	(Saudi Arabia) Abdullah Al-Owaishir	(Saudi Arabia) Al-Fateh	Free	
26 June 2018	MF	(Brazil) Petros	(Brazil) São Paulo	€5,000,000	
16 July 2018	MF	(Morocco) Nordin Amrabat	(England) Watford	€4,700,000	
20 July 2018	DF	(Peru) Christian Ramos	(Mexico) Veracruz	€2,500,000	
31 July 2018	GK	(Australia) Brad Jones	(Netherlands) Feyenoord	Free	
3 August 2018	FW	(Nigeria) Ahmed Musa	(England) Leicester City	€18,000,000	
20 August 2018	MF	(Brazil) Giuliano	(Turkey) Fenerbahçe	€10,500,000	
23 August 2018	FW	(Morocco) Abderrazak Hamdallah	(Qatar) Al-Rayyan	Free	
2 February 2019	MF	(Saudi Arabia) Abdullah Al-Khaibari	(Saudi Arabia) Al-Shabab	€1,160,000	

=== Loans in ===
Date	Pos.	Name	Parent club	End date	Source
3 February 2019	MF	(Saudi Arabia) Abdullah Al Salem	(Saudi Arabia) Al-Fayha	End of season	
4 February 2019	DF	(Brazil) Maicon	(Turkey) Galatasaray	30 June 2020	

=== Out ===
Date	Pos.	Name	New club	Fee	Source
10 July 2018	GK	(Saudi Arabia) Hussain Shae'an	(Saudi Arabia) Al-Taawoun	Free	
26 July 2018	MF	(Tunisia) Ferjani Sassi	(Egypt) Zamalek	€5,000,000	
29 October 2018	FW	(Saudi Arabia) Hassan Al-Raheb	(Saudi Arabia) Al-Shabab	Free	
17 January 2019	MF	(Saudi Arabia) Abdulellah Al-Nassar	(Saudi Arabia) Al-Bukayriyah	Free	

=== Loans out ===
Date	Pos.	Name	To	End date	Source
27 May 2018	DF	(Saudi Arabia) Abdulelah Al-Amri	(Saudi Arabia) Al-Wehda	End of season	
11 July 2018	FW	(Democratic Republic of the Congo) Junior Kabananga	(Kazakhstan) Astana	End of season	
15 July 2018	MF	(Saudi Arabia) Abdulrahman Al-Dhefiri	(Saudi Arabia) Al-Batin	4 February 2019	
25 July 2018	DF	(Saudi Arabia) Salem Ali	(Saudi Arabia) Al-Hazem	25 January 2019	
30 July 2018	FW	(Saudi Arabia) Muteb Al-Hammad	(Saudi Arabia) Al-Batin	End of season	
31 July 2018	DF	(Saudi Arabia) Muteb Al-Mutlaq	(Saudi Arabia) Al-Raed	End of season	
20 August 2018	DF	(Saudi Arabia) Hamad Al-Aqeeli	(Saudi Arabia) Al-Mujazzal	End of season	
20 August 2018	MF	(Saudi Arabia) Mohammed Al-Shahrani	(Saudi Arabia) Damac	End of season	
25 August 2018	DF	(Saudi Arabia) Khalid Al-Dubaysh	(Saudi Arabia) Al-Shoulla	18 January 2019	
12 September 2018	MF	(Morocco) Mohamed Fouzair	(Morocco) Ittihad Tanger	1 January 2019	
13 January 2019	MF	(Morocco) Mohamed Fouzair	(Saudi Arabia) Ohod	End of season	
25 January 2019	DF	(Saudi Arabia) Salem Ali	(Saudi Arabia) Al-Shoulla	End of season	
2 February 2019	DF	(Saudi Arabia) Khalid Al-Ghamdi	(Saudi Arabia) Al-Raed	End of season	
3 February 2019	MF	(Saudi Arabia) Sami Al-Najei	(Saudi Arabia) Al-Qadsiah	End of season	
4 February 2019	DF	(Saudi Arabia) Khaled Al-Showaie	(Saudi Arabia) Al-Mujazzal	End of season	
4 February 2019	MF	(Saudi Arabia) Abdulrahman Al-Dhefiri	(Saudi Arabia) Al-Ain	End of season	
17 February 2019	GK	(Saudi Arabia) Abdullah Al-Owaishir	(Saudi Arabia) Ohod	End of season	
20 February 2019	MF	(Saudi Arabia) Abdulrahman Al-Shanar	(Saudi Arabia) Al-Raed	End of season	

== Pre-season and friendlies ==
18 July 2018 Friendly	Al-Nassr (Saudi Arabia)	9–0	(Switzerland) Abtwil-Engelburg	Gaiserwald, Switzerland
17:00 CEST	Fouzair 5', 47', 58'; Yahya 16'; Al-Jumeiah 27'; Al-Fraidi 46', 56'; Al-Obaid 72'; Al-Shahrani 82'	Report		Stadium: Sportanlage Spiserwis

24 July 2018 Friendly	Al-Nassr (Saudi Arabia)	4–0	(Switzerland) Neuchâtel Xamax	Neuchâtel, Switzerland
18:00 CEST	Al-Ghanam 2'; Khamis 48'; Al-Showaie 68'; Al-Shahrani 81'	Report		Stadium: Stade de la Maladière

1 August 2018 Friendly	Al-Nassr (Saudi Arabia)	4–0	(Italy) Como	Switzerland
17:00 CEST	Al-Sahlawi 6', 62'; Amrabat 30'; Al-Fraidi 76'	Report

5 August 2018 Friendly	Al-Nassr (Saudi Arabia)	5–0	(United Arab Emirates) Baniyas	Driel, Netherlands
17:05 CEST	Amrabat 15', 37'; Al-Jebreen 19'; Al-Sahlawi 76'; Petros 78'	Report		Stadium: Football RKSV Driel

== Competitions ==
=== Overview ===
Competition	Record								Started round	Final position / round	First match	Last match
Competition	G	W	D	L	GF	GA	GD	Win %	Started round	Final position / round	First match	Last match
Pro League	30	22	4	4	69	26	+43	73.33	1st	1st (champions)	30 August 2018	16 May 2019
King's Cup	5	4	0	1	23	3	+20	80.00	Round of 64	Semi-finals	3 January 2019	27 April 2019
Arab Club Champions Cup	4	2	0	2	7	5	+2	50.00	Round of 32	Round of 16	13 August 2018	28 November 2018
AFC Champions League	7	4	1	2	15	7	+8	57.14	Play-off round	Quarter-finals	19 February 2019	16 September 2019
Total	46	32	5	9	114	41	+73	69.57				

Updated to match played 29 May 2019
Source: Competitions

=== Pro League ===
==== League table ====
Pos	Team	Pld	W	D	L	GF	GA	GD	Pts	Qualification or relegation
1	Al-Nassr (C)	30	22	4	4	69	27	+42	70	Qualification for AFC Champions League group stage (Note: Al-Taawoun qualified for the AFC Champions League group stage as 2019 King Cup winners.)
2	Al-Hilal	30	21	6	3	66	33	+33	69	Qualification for AFC Champions League group stage
3	Al-Taawoun	30	16	8	6	61	31	+30	56	Qualification for AFC Champions League group stage
4	Al-Ahli	30	17	4	9	68	41	+27	55	Qualification for AFC Champions League play-off round
5	Al-Shabab	30	15	9	6	39	25	+14	54	Qualification for Arab Club Champions Cup

Source: spl.com
Rules for classification: 1) Points; 2) Head-to-head points; 3) Head-to-head goal difference; 4) Total goal difference; 5) Total goals scored; 6) Play-off (only for deciding champion, relegation and AFC competitions participation).
(C) Champions

==== Results summary ====
Overall								Home						Away					
Pld	W	D	L	GF	GA	GD	Pts	W	D	L	GF	GA	GD	W	D	L	GF	GA	GD
30	22	4	4	69	27	+42	70	12	0	3	37	15	+22	10	4	1	32	12	+20

Last updated: 16 May 2019.
Source: Competitive matches

==== Results by round ====
Round	1	2	3	4	5	6	7	8	9	10	11	12	13	14	15	16	17	18	19	20	21	22	23	24	25	26	27	28	29	30
Ground	A	H	A	H	H	A	A	H	A	H	H	A	H	A	A	A	H	A	H	A	H	A	H	A	H	A	H	H	A	H
Result	W	W	W	W	W	W	D	L	W	W	L	D	W	W	D	D	W	L	W	W	W	W	W	W	W	W	L	W	W	W
Position	1	3	2	2	1	1	1	3	2	2	2	2	2	2	2	2	2	2	2	2	2	2	2	2	1	1	2	1	1	1

Updated to match(es) played on 16 May 2019. Source: Competitive matches
A = Away; H = Home; W = Win; D = Draw; L = Loss

==== Matches ====
All times are local, AST (UTC+3).

Win Draw Loss Postponed

30 August 2018 1	Ohod	1–2	Al-Nassr	Medina
19:15	Petros 14' (o.g.); Apodi (yellow card) 61'; Abdulghani (yellow card) 82'	Report	Al-Shehri 12'; Amrabat (yellow card) 90', (goal) 90+6'; Al Mansor (yellow card) 90+5'	Stadium: Prince Mohammed bin Abdul Aziz Stadium; Attendance: 17,794; Referee: Pavel Královec (Czech Republic)

14 September 2018 2	Al-Nassr	2–1	Al-Faisaly	Riyadh
18:40	Al-Shehri 19'; Giuliano 63'; Al Mansor (yellow card) 69'; Al-Ghanam (yellow card) 73'	Report	Abousaban (yellow card) 23'; Calderón 27'; Igor Rossi (yellow card) 78' (yellow-red card) 90+9'; Hyland (yellow card) 90+4'	Stadium: Prince Faisal bin Fahd Stadium; Attendance: 12,634; Referee: Viktor Kassai (Hungary)

19 September 2018 3	Al-Qadsiah	0–3	Al-Nassr	Khobar
20:20	Fallatah (yellow card) 11' (yellow-red card) 48'	Report	Musa 21', 40', 66'	Stadium: Prince Saud bin Jalawi Stadium; Attendance: 9,145; Referee: Artur Soares Dias (Portugal)

24 September 2018 4	Al-Nassr	1–0	Al-Taawoun	Riyadh
20:10	Hamdallah (yellow card) 37', (goal) 75'; Al-Jebreen (yellow card) 85'	Report	Al-Absi (yellow card) 8' (yellow-red card) 48'; Al-Olayan (yellow card) 37'; Machado (yellow card) 81'; Al-Bishi (yellow card) 82'	Stadium: Prince Faisal bin Fahd Stadium; Attendance: 15,631; Referee: Damir Skomina (Slovenia)

5 October 2018 5	Al-Nassr	5–1	Al-Hazem	Riyadh
20:40	Musa 26'; Giuliano 47', 57'; Al-Jebreen (yellow card) 54'; Amrabat 74'; Al-Sahlawi 79'	Report	Rodolfo 32', (yellow card) 45+1'	Stadium: Prince Faisal bin Fahd Stadium; Attendance: 10,056; Referee: Mark Clattenburg (England)

19 October 2018 6	Al-Batin	0–2	Al-Nassr	Hafar al-Batin
18:10		Report	Lucas 4' (o.g.); Hamdallah 63'; Khamis (yellow card) 90+1'	Stadium: Al-Batin Club Stadium; Attendance: 6,000; Referee: Szymon Marciniak (Poland)

26 October 2018 7	Al-Fayha	1–1	Al-Nassr	Al-Majma'ah
19:45	Asprilla 58'; Ba Masoud (yellow card) 62'; Buhimed (yellow card) 89'	Report	Amrabat 15'; Al-Ghanam (yellow card) 41'	Stadium: King Salman Sport City Stadium; Attendance: 4,307; Referee: Milorad Mažić (Serbia)

3 November 2018 8	Al-Nassr	0–2	Al-Ahli	Riyadh
17:55		Report	Souza (yellow card) 48'; Al-Fatil (yellow card) 59'; Al-Mousa (yellow card) 74'; Al Somah 75'; Al-Mowalad (yellow card) 90'; Djaniny 90+4'	Stadium: Prince Faisal bin Fahd Stadium; Attendance: 20,000; Referee: Ravshan Irmatov (Uzbekistan)

11 November 2018 9	Al-Ettifaq	1–2	Al-Nassr	Dammam
20:15	Al-Sonain (yellow card) 24'; Hazazi (yellow card) 53'; Al-Robeai 82'; Ben Youssef (yellow card) 89'	Report	Uvini (yellow card) 31'; Giuliano 32'; Amrabat 68'; Khamis (yellow card) 85'	Stadium: Prince Mohamed bin Fahd Stadium; Attendance: 12,284; Referee: Damir Skomina (Slovenia)

23 November 2018 10	Al-Nassr	1–0	Al-Shabab	Riyadh
19:40	Musa 35'; Al-Shehri (yellow card) 59'; Petros (red card) 74'	Report	Găman (yellow card) 18'; Benlamri (yellow card) 41' (yellow-red card) 90+5'; Bahebri (yellow card) 62'; Budescu (yellow card) 65'; Salem (yellow card) 90'	Stadium: Prince Faisal bin Fahd Stadium; Attendance: 4,331; Referee: Pavel Královec (Czech Republic)

2 December 2018 11	Al-Nassr	1–2	Al-Wehda	Riyadh
17:45	Giuliano 10'; Al-Dossari (yellow card) 42'	Report	Marcos Guilherme (yellow card) 23'; Abdu Jaber 62', 74'	Stadium: Prince Faisal bin Fahd Stadium; Attendance: 4,763; Referee: Sandro Ricci (Brazil)

8 December 2018 12	Al-Hilal	2–2	Al-Nassr	Riyadh
15:10	Gomis 3', 18'; Otayf (yellow card) 10'; Carlos Eduardo (yellow card) 38'; Al-Shahrani (yellow card) 59'; Botía (yellow card) 70'; Carrillo (red card) 90+4'	Report	Giuliano 73'; Hamdallah 78', (yellow card) 78'; Khamis (yellow card) 90'	Stadium: King Saud University Stadium; Attendance: 23,047; Referee: Néstor Pitana (Argentina)

14 December 2018 13	Al-Nassr	4–0	Al-Raed	Riyadh
15:05	Hamdallah 8' (pen.), 45+2', 45+3', 46'; Uvini (yellow card) 43'	Report	Belkaroui (yellow card) 16'; Farhan (yellow card) 42'	Stadium: Prince Faisal bin Fahd Stadium; Attendance: 6,778; Referee: Ovidiu Hațegan (Romania)

21 December 2018 14	Al-Ittihad	1–2	Al-Nassr	Jeddah
18:25	Al-Muwallad (yellow card) 28', (goal) 49'; Qassem (yellow card) 90+1'	Report	Hamdallah 21' (pen.), 82' (pen.); Uvini (yellow card) 36'; Al-Jebreen (yellow card) 79'; Amrabat (yellow card) 90+8'	Stadium: King Abdullah Sports City; Attendance: 50,376; Referee: Viktor Kassai (Hungary)

28 December 2018 15	Al-Fateh	0–0	Al-Nassr	Al-Hasa
15:00	Al-Majhad (yellow card) 67'; Aguirregaray (yellow card) 85'	Report	Ramos (yellow card) 14' (yellow-red card) 54'	Stadium: Prince Abdullah bin Jalawi Stadium; Attendance: 8,381; Referee: Alberto Undiano Mallenco (Spain)

10 January 2019 16	Al-Faisaly	2–2	Al-Nassr	Al Majma'ah
18:05	Al Ansari 56'; Hyland (yellow card) 68'; Rogerinho 90+8'	Report	Amrabat 2'; Uvini (yellow card) 54'; Petros (yellow card) 70'; Al-Jebreen (yellow card) 73'; Al Mansor 85'; Khamis (yellow card) 88'	Stadium: King Salman Sport City Stadium; Attendance: 2,048; Referee: Szymon Marciniak (Poland)

28 January 2019 17	Al-Nassr	4–0	Ohod	Al Majma'ah
18:20	Hamdallah 16', (yellow card) 90+1'; Al-Ghanam 45+1'; Al-Shehri 71'; Khamis 78'	Report	Hawsawi (yellow card) 38'	Stadium: King Salman Sport City Stadium; Attendance: 3,039; Referee: Svein Oddvar Moen (Norway)

2 February 2019 18	Al-Taawoun	3–1	Al-Nassr	Buraidah
20:15	Petrolina 17'; Amissi (yellow card) 29'; Tawamba 33' (pen.); Héldon 77' (pen.)	Report	Giuliano 40'	Stadium: King Abdullah Sport City Stadium; Attendance: 10,600; Referee: Damir Skomina (Slovenia)

6 February 2019 19	Al-Nassr	3–1	Al-Qadsiah	Riyadh
20:15	Hamdallah 10'; Williams 81' (o.g.); Al-Ghanam 90'; Jones (yellow card) 90+4'	Report	Williams 71'; Fatau (yellow card) 90+3'	Stadium: Prince Faisal bin Fahd Stadium; Attendance: 4,321; Referee: Pavel Královec (Czech Republic)

12 February 2019 20	Al-Ahli	1–2	Al-Nassr	Jeddah
20:20	Hindi (yellow card) 23'; Al Somah 59' (pen.)	Report	Hamdallah 45+1', 60'; Uvini (yellow card) 52'; Amrabat (yellow card) 90+2'	Stadium: King Abdullah Sports City; Attendance: 30,335; Referee: Cüneyt Çakır (Turkey)

23 February 2019 21	Al-Nassr	1–0	Al-Fayha	Riyadh
20:25	Hamdallah 68' (pen.)	Report	Fallatah (yellow card) 29'; Al-Qahtani (yellow card) 40'; Gegé (yellow card) 51'; Asprilla (yellow card) 70'; Al-Khaibari (yellow card) 73'	Stadium: Prince Faisal bin Fahd Stadium; Attendance: 6,022; Referee: Damir Skomina (Slovenia)

28 February 2019 22	Al-Shabab	0–1	Al-Nassr	Riyadh
20:30	Găman (yellow card) 32'; Benlamri (yellow card) 38'; Al-Sulayhem (yellow card) 43'; Luiz Antônio (yellow card) 86'	Report	Hamdallah 38'; Amrabat (yellow card) 51'; Petros (yellow card) 90+4'	Stadium: King Fahd International Stadium; Attendance: 14,530; Referee: Anastasios Sidiropoulos (Greece)

8 March 2019 23	Al-Nassr	3–2	Al-Ettifaq	Riyadh
18:40	Al-Jumeiah (yellow card) 62', (goal) 89'; Hamdallah 70', 90+8'	Report	Alemán (yellow card) 24' (yellow-red card) 45+5'; Arias 27', (yellow card) 90+13'; Al-Kwikbi (yellow card) 46'; Kiss 56', (yellow card) 90+15'; Al-Aboud (yellow card) 72'; El Sayed (red card) 90+11'	Stadium: King Fahd International Stadium; Attendance: 5,843; Referee: Tomasz Musiał (Poland)

16 March 2019 24	Al-Wehda	0–4	Al-Nassr	Mecca
20:30	Al-Jadaani (yellow card) 7'; Marcos Guilherme (yellow card) 79'; Al-Sqoor (yellow card) 82'; Al-Malki (yellow card) 90'	Report	Hamdallah 8' (pen.), 58', 60', 87'	Stadium: King Abdul Aziz Stadium; Attendance: 7,238; Referee: Ravshan Irmatov (Uzbekistan)

29 March 2019 25	Al-Nassr	3–2	Al-Hilal	Riyadh
20:40	Al-Ghanam (yellow card) 45'; Hamdallah 46'; Al-Obaid (yellow card) 53'; Uvini 77', 90+7', (yellow card) 90+7'	Report	Kanno (yellow card) 20' (yellow-red card) 67'; Degenek (yellow card) 49'; Al-Bulaihi 53'; Carrillo (yellow card) 57'; Carlos Eduardo (yellow card) 60'; Al-Dawsari 79'	Stadium: King Fahd International Stadium; Attendance: 57,716; Referee: Cüneyt Çakır (Turkey)

4 April 2019 26	Al-Raed	0–5	Al-Nassr	Buraidah
19:00	Al-Shehri (yellow card) 18' (yellow-red card) 68'	Report	Hamdallah 2', 38', 60'; Petros 8'; Atwa 28' (o.g.)	Stadium: King Abdullah Sport City Stadium; Attendance: 11,735; Referee: Bakary Gassama (Gambia)

13 April 2019 27	Al-Nassr	2–3	Al-Ittihad	Riyadh
18:50	Uvini (yellow card) 55'; Hamdallah 69', 74' (pen.)	Report	Sanogo (yellow card) 27'; Prijović 32', 43'; Al-Muwallad (yellow card) 51', (goal) 88'; Romarinho (yellow card) 61'; Jonas (yellow card) 68'; El Ahmadi (yellow card) 73'	Stadium: King Fahd International Stadium; Attendance: 30,014; Referee: Pavel Královec (Czech Republic)

18 April 2019 28	Al-Nassr	5–0	Al-Fateh	Riyadh
20:45	Hamdallah 27', 55'; Musa 38', 78'; Petros (yellow card) 39'; Giuliano 45+4'; Al-Jebreen (yellow card) 90'	Report	Aguirregaray (yellow card) 30'; João Pedro (yellow card) 73'	Stadium: Prince Faisal bin Fahd Stadium; Attendance: 5,793; Referee: Viktor Kassai (Hungary)

11 May 2019 29	Al-Hazem	0–3	Al-Nassr	Ar Rass
22:30	Bakhit (yellow card) 51'; Muralha (yellow card) 58'	Report	Hamdallah 5' (pen.), 26', 66', (yellow card) 33'; Al-Obaid (yellow card) 35'	Stadium: Al-Hazem Club Stadium; Attendance: 6,200; Referee: Viktor Kassai (Hungary)

16 May 2019 30	Al-Nassr	2–1	Al-Batin	Riyadh
22:30	Hamdallah 26' (pen.), 57', (yellow card) 27'; Al-Ghanam (yellow card) 36'	Report	Ghunaiman (yellow card) 25'; Lucas (yellow card) 25'; Jhonnattann (yellow card) 40'; Ounalli 53'	Stadium: King Fahd International Stadium; Attendance: 59,174; Referee: Ovidiu Hațegan (Romania)

=== King's Cup ===
All times are local, AST (UTC+3).

3 January 2019 Round of 64	Al-Jandal	0–6	Al-Nassr	Sakakah
15:35	Al-Doknan (yellow card) 26' (yellow-red card) 49'; Al-Junaidi (yellow card) 27'	Report	Hamdallah 29', 66', 80'; Musa 47', 90+1'; Giuliano 88'	Stadium: Al-Orobah Club Stadium; Referee: Khaled Salwi

15 January 2019 Round of 32	Al-Nassr	5–0	Al-Ansar	Riyadh
19:30	Hamdallah 7', 9', 84', 86'; Al-Jebreen (yellow card) 48'; Giuliano 74'	Report	Muaaz (yellow card) 30'	Stadium: King Fahd International Stadium; Referee: Majed Al-Shamrani

21 January 2019 Round of 16	Al-Fayha	0–6	Al-Nassr	Al Majma'ah
18:15	Buhimed (red card) 70'; Asprilla (yellow card) 85'	Report	Al-Jumeiah (yellow card) 11', (goal) 86'; Al-Jebreen (yellow card) 21'; Giuliano 52'; Hamdallah 56', 59', 72', 81'	Stadium: King Salman Sport City Stadium; Referee: Ovidiu Hațegan (Romania)

1 April 2019 Quarter-finals	Al-Nassr	4–0	Al-Jeel	Riyadh
20:35	Al-Jumeiah 10', (yellow card) 45+1'; Petros 73', 90'; Hamdallah 86' (pen.)	Report	Al-Hunain (yellow card) 58'; Abu Bakr (yellow card) 85'; Anderson (yellow card) 90+2'	Stadium: King Fahd International Stadium; Referee: Artur Soares Dias (Portugal)

27 April 2019 Semi-finals	Al-Ittihad	4–2	Al-Nassr	Jeddah
19:25	El Ahmadi (yellow card) 34'; Prijović 44' da Costa (yellow card) 45+2'; Al-Muwallad 60', (yellow card) 71'; Assiri (yellow card) 91'; Romarinho 96', 106'	Report	Petros (yellow card) 43'; Hamdallah 66', 89' (pen.), (yellow card) 115'	Stadium: King Abdullah Sports City; Attendance: 43,375; Referee: Felix Brych (Germany)

=== Arab Club Champions Cup ===
==== Round of 32 ====
13 August 2018 First leg	Al-Jazira (United Arab Emirates)	1–2	(Saudi Arabia) Al-Nassr	Abu Dhabi, United Arab Emirates
19:45 GST	Mubarak 22'; Mabkhout (yellow card) 43'	Report	Al-Shehri 4', (yellow card) 47'; Musa 75'	Stadium: Mohammed Bin Zayed Stadium; Referee: Mahmoud El Banna (Egypt)

29 September 2018 Second leg	Al-Nassr (Saudi Arabia)	4–1 (6–2 agg.)	(United Arab Emirates) Al-Jazira	Riyadh, Saudi Arabia
20:30 AST	Al-Shehri 17'; Khamis (yellow card) 57'; Amrabat 74', 86'; Al-Sahlawi 90'	Report	Leonardo 7'; Al Hammadi (yellow card) 13'; Obaid (yellow card) 52'	Stadium: Prince Faisal bin Fahd Stadium; Referee: Gehad Grisha (Egypt)

==== Round of 16 ====
7 November 2018 First leg	Al-Nassr (Saudi Arabia)	0–1	(Algeria) MC Alger	Riyadh, Saudi Arabia
20:00 AST	Al-Fraidi (yellow card) 88'	Report	Azzi (yellow card) 38'; Bendebka (yellow card) 40'; Dieng (yellow card) 45+1'; Derrardja 61'	Stadium: Prince Faisal bin Fahd Stadium; Referee: Redouane Jiyed (Morocco)

28 November 2018 Second leg	MC Alger (Algeria)	2–1 (3–1 agg.)	(Saudi Arabia) Al-Nassr	Algiers, Algeria
19:00 EET	Mebarakou 31'; Hamdallah 65' (o.g.)	Report	Musa (red card) 89'; Al-Shehri 90+5'	Stadium: Stade du 5 Juillet 1962; Referee: Adham Makhadmeh (Jordan)

=== AFC Champions League ===
==== Play-off round ====
19 February 2019 Play-off round	Al-Nassr (Saudi Arabia)	4–0	(Uzbekistan) AGMK	Riyadh, Saudi Arabia
18:00 AST	Hawsawi 55'; Al-Ghanam 62'; Al-Jebreen (yellow card) 75'; Giuliano 80', 90+3'	Report	Polvonov (yellow card) 34'; Kostić (yellow card) 43'; Juraev (yellow card) 61'	Stadium: Prince Faisal bin Fahd Stadium; Attendance: 6,915; Referee: Muhammad Taqi (Singapore)

==== Group stage ====
The group stage draw was made on 22 November 2018 in Kuala Lumpur. Al-Nassr were drawn with Al-Wasl, Al-Zawra'a, and Zob Ahan.

Pos	Team	Pld	W	D	L	GF	GA	GD	Pts	Qualification	ZOB	NAS	ZAW	WAS
1	(Iran) Zob Ahan	6	3	3	0	10	5	+5	12	Advance to knockout stage	—	0–0	0–0	2–0
2	(Saudi Arabia) Al-Nassr	6	3	1	2	11	7	+4	10	Advance to knockout stage	2–3	—	4–1	3–1
3	(Iraq) Al-Zawraa	6	2	2	2	14	9	+5	8		2–2	1–2	—	5–0
4	(United Arab Emirates) Al-Wasl	6	1	0	5	4	18	−14	3		1–3	1–0	1–5	—

Source: AFC
Rules for classification: Group stage tiebreakers

4 March 2019 1	Al-Wasl (United Arab Emirates)	1–0	(Saudi Arabia) Al-Nassr	Dubai, United Arab Emirates
19:20 UTC+4	Saleh (yellow card) 6'; Jassem (yellow card) 44'; Fabio Lima 62' (pen.)	Live Report; Stats Report	Al-Jebreen (yellow card) 9'; Al-Obaid (yellow card) 43'	Stadium: Zabeel Stadium; Attendance: 5,370; Referee: Peter Green (Australia)

11 March 2019 2	Al-Nassr (Saudi Arabia)	2–3	(Iran) Zob Ahan	Dubai, United Arab Emirates
19:45 UTC+4	Giuliano 5'; Hamdallah 58' (pen.)	Live Report; Stats Report	Fakhreddini (yellow card) 24'; Nejadmehdi 30'; Mohammadzadeh 39', (yellow card) 90+4'; Mazaheri (yellow card) 56'; Motahari 90+1'; Hosseini (yellow card) 90+4'	Stadium: Al Maktoum Stadium; Attendance: 2,850; Referee: Ma Ning (China)

8 April 2019 3	Al-Nassr (Saudi Arabia)	4–1	(Iraq) Al-Zawraa	Riyadh, Saudi Arabia
20:15 UTC+3	Al Salem 24' (pen.); Al-Shehri 29'; Khamis (yellow card) 38'; Hawsawi 59'; Giuliano 90+4'	Live Report; Stats Report	Fadhel 12'; Hadi (yellow card) 30'; Jwayed (yellow card) 64'; Abdul-Raheem (yellow card) 64'	Stadium: King Fahd International Stadium; Attendance: 3,228; Referee: Jumpei Iida (Japan)

23 April 2019 4	Al-Zawraa (Iraq)	1–2	(Saudi Arabia) Al-Nassr	Karbala, Iraq
18:00 UTC+3	Abbas 30'; Hadi (yellow card) 54'; Mohammed (yellow card) 78'	Live Report; Stats Report	Al-Shehri 56'; Al-Farshan 90+8'	Stadium: Karbala Sports City; Attendance: 27,500; Referee: Ahmed Al-Kaf (Oman)

7 May 2019 5	Al-Nassr (Saudi Arabia)	3–1	(United Arab Emirates) Al-Wasl	Riyadh, Saudi Arabia
22:00 UTC+3	Al-Jebreen (yellow card) 29'; Giuliano 30'; Al-Jumeiah 34'; Al Salem 56'; Khamis (yellow card) 87'	Live Report; Stats Report	Khamis 90'	Stadium: King Fahd International Stadium; Attendance: 3,876; Referee: Ma Ning (China)

29 May 2019 (Note: The Zob Ahan v Al-Nassr match, originally scheduled to be played on 21 May 2019, 21:00 UTC+3, at Karbala Sports City, Karbala (Iraq), was postponed due to safety concerns. The match was rescheduled to 29 May 2019 and moved to a new venue.) 6	Zob Ahan (Iran)	0–0	(Saudi Arabia) Al-Nassr	Doha, Qatar
21:30 UTC+3	Mehdi (yellow card) 76'	Live Report; Stats Report		Stadium: Grand Hamad Stadium; Referee: Valentin Kovalenko (Uzbekistan)

== Statistics ==
=== Appearances ===
Last updated on 29 May 2019.

No.	Pos	Nat	Player	Total		Pro League		King's Cup		Arab Club Champions Cup		Champions League	
No.	Pos	Nat	Player	Apps	Goals	Apps	Goals	Apps	Goals	Apps	Goals	Apps	Goals
Goalkeepers
1	GK	(Australia) AUS	Brad Jones	35	0	24+1	0	4	0	2	0	4	0
31	GK	(Saudi Arabia) KSA	Zaid Al-Bawardi	1	0	0	0	0	0	0	0	1	0
33	GK	(Saudi Arabia) KSA	Waleed Abdullah	11	0	6+1	0	0	0	2	0	2	0
43	GK	(Saudi Arabia) KSA	Saleh Al Ohaymid	0	0	0	0	0	0	0	0	0	0
Defenders
2	DF	(Saudi Arabia) KSA	Sultan Al-Ghanam	36	3	26	2	2	0	4	0	4	1
4	DF	(Saudi Arabia) KSA	Omar Hawsawi	25	2	13	0	2	0	3	0	7	2
5	DF	(Brazil) BRA	Bruno Uvini	31	2	25	2	4	0	2	0	0	0
13	DF	(Saudi Arabia) KSA	Abdulrahman Al-Obaid	20	0	11	0	2+1	0	0	0	4+2	0
18	DF	(Brazil) BRA	Maicon	11	0	7	0	1	0	0	0	2+1	0
20	DF	(Saudi Arabia) KSA	Hamad Al Mansor	22	1	10+1	1	3+1	0	2	0	5	0
26	DF	(Saudi Arabia) KSA	Abdullah Madu	11	0	5	0	1	0	0	0	5	0
37	DF	(Saudi Arabia) KSA	Naif Almas	1	0	1	0	0	0	0	0	0	0
Midfielders
6	MF	(Brazil) BRA	Petros	34	3	26+1	1	5	2	2	0	0	0
8	MF	(Saudi Arabia) KSA	Yahya Al-Shehri	36	8	12+12	3	1+1	0	4	3	5+1	2
11	MF	(Morocco) MAR	Nordin Amrabat	32	7	24+2	5	2+1	0	3	2	0	0
14	MF	(Saudi Arabia) KSA	Ibrahim Ghaleb	14	0	9+2	0	0	0	3	0	0	0
15	MF	(Saudi Arabia) KSA	Ahmed Al-Fraidi	11	0	2+3	0	0+2	0	1+3	0	0	0
16	MF	(Saudi Arabia) KSA	Abdulaziz Al-Jebreen	30	0	8+9	0	4	0	2+1	0	6	0
17	MF	(Saudi Arabia) KSA	Abdullah Al-Khaibari	13	0	8	0	1	0	0	0	4	0
25	MF	(Saudi Arabia) KSA	Nawaf Al-Farshan	11	1	1+2	0	1	0	1+1	0	1+4	1
27	MF	(Saudi Arabia) KSA	Awadh Khamis	29	1	14+3	1	3+1	0	3+1	0	4	0
29	MF	(Saudi Arabia) KSA	Rakan Al-Shamlan	7	0	0+2	0	2	0	0	0	0+3	0
32	MF	(Saudi Arabia) KSA	Saud Zidan	0	0	0	0	0	0	0	0	0	0
38	MF	(Saudi Arabia) KSA	Fahad Al-Jumeiah	27	4	4+11	1	2+1	2	1+2	0	6	1
39	MF	(Saudi Arabia) KSA	Abdurahman Al-Dossari	16	0	3+7	0	0+1	0	0	0	4+1	0
45	MF	(Saudi Arabia) KSA	Faraj Al-Ghushayan	1	0	0	0	0+1	0	0	0	0	0
46	MF	(Saudi Arabia) KSA	Khalid Al-Ghwinem	2	0	0	0	0	0	0	0	0+2	0
71	MF	(Saudi Arabia) KSA	Abdullah Al Salem	16	2	1+8	0	0	0	0	0	6+1	2
77	MF	(Brazil) BRA	Giuliano	40	16	30	8	4+1	3	0	0	4+1	5
98	MF	(Saudi Arabia) KSA	Abdulrahman Al-Shanar	0	0	0	0	0	0	0	0	0	0
Forwards
7	FW	(Nigeria) NGA	Ahmed Musa	31	10	22+2	7	3	2	3+1	1	0	0
9	FW	(Morocco) MAR	Abderrazak Hamdallah	34	49	25+1	34	5	14	1	0	2	1
10	FW	(Saudi Arabia) KSA	Mohammad Al-Sahlawi	15	2	3+8	1	0+1	0	3	1	0	0
36	FW	(Saudi Arabia) KSA	Khalil Al-Absi	0	0	0	0	0	0	0	0	0	0
42	FW	(Saudi Arabia) KSA	Firas Al-Buraikan	12	0	1+3	0	0+2	0	0+1	0	1+4	0
Players sent out on loan this season
12	DF	(Saudi Arabia) KSA	Khalid Al-Ghamdi	0	0	0	0	0	0	0	0	0	0
35	DF	(Saudi Arabia) KSA	Khaled Al-Showaie	1	0	0+1	0	0	0	0	0	0	0
Player who made an appearance this season but have left the club
3	DF	(Peru) PER	Christian Ramos	15	0	9+1	0	2+1	0	2	0	0	0
22	GK	(Saudi Arabia) KSA	Abdullah Al-Owaishir	2	0	0+1	0	1	0	0	0	0	0

=== Goalscorers ===
Rank	No.	Pos	Nat	Name	Pro League	King's Cup	Arab Club Champions Cup	Champions League	Total
1	9	FW	(Morocco)	Abderrazak Hamdallah	34	14	0	4	52
2	77	MF	(Brazil)	Giuliano	8	3	0	5	16
3	7	FW	(Nigeria)	Ahmed Musa	7	2	1	0	10
4	8	MF	(Saudi Arabia)	Yahya Al-Shehri	3	0	3	2	8
5	11	MF	(Morocco)	Nordin Amrabat	5	0	2	0	7
6	38	MF	(Saudi Arabia)	Fahad Al-Jumeiah	1	2	0	1	4
7	2	DF	(Saudi Arabia)	Sultan Al-Ghanam	2	0	0	1	3
7	6	MF	(Brazil)	Petros	1	2	0	0	3
9	4	DF	(Saudi Arabia)	Omar Hawsawi	0	0	0	2	2
9	5	DF	(Brazil)	Bruno Uvini	2	0	0	0	2
9	10	FW	(Saudi Arabia)	Mohammad Al-Sahlawi	1	0	1	0	2
9	71	MF	(Saudi Arabia)	Abdullah Al Salem	0	0	0	2	2
13	20	DF	(Saudi Arabia)	Hamad Al Mansor	1	0	0	0	1
13	25	MF	(Saudi Arabia)	Nawaf Al-Farshan	0	0	0	1	1
13	27	MF	(Saudi Arabia)	Awadh Khamis	1	0	0	0	1
Own goal					3	0	0	0	3
Total					69	23	7	15	114

Last Updated: 16 May 2019

=== Assists ===
Rank	No.	Pos	Nat	Name	Pro League	King's Cup	Arab Club Champions Cup	Champions League	Total
1	77	MF	(Brazil)	Giuliano	5	5	0	2	12
2	9	FW	(Morocco)	Abderrazak Hamdallah	9	1	0	0	10
2	11	MF	(Morocco)	Nordin Amrabat	9	1	0	0	10
4	7	FW	(Nigeria)	Ahmed Musa	7	1	0	0	8
5	6	MF	(Brazil)	Petros	4	2	0	0	6
6	2	DF	(Saudi Arabia)	Sultan Al-Ghanam	5	0	0	0	5
6	8	MF	(Saudi Arabia)	Yahya Al-Shehri	2	0	0	3	5
6	38	MF	(Saudi Arabia)	Fahad Al-Jumeiah	3	2	0	0	5
9	20	DF	(Saudi Arabia)	Hamad Al Mansor	1	0	0	2	3
9	27	MF	(Saudi Arabia)	Awadh Khamis	0	0	3	0	3
11	10	FW	(Saudi Arabia)	Mohammad Al-Sahlawi	1	1	0	0	2
11	13	DF	(Saudi Arabia)	Abdulrahman Al-Obaid	2	0	0	0	2
11	29	MF	(Saudi Arabia)	Rakan Al-Shamlan	0	2	0	0	2
11	39	MF	(Saudi Arabia)	Abdurahman Al-Dossari	1	0	0	1	2
11	42	FW	(Saudi Arabia)	Firas Al-Buraikan	0	1	0	1	2
16	15	MF	(Saudi Arabia)	Ahmed Al-Fraidi	1	0	0	0	1
16	16	MF	(Saudi Arabia)	Abdulaziz Al-Jebreen	0	0	0	1	1
16	17	MF	(Saudi Arabia)	Abdullah Al-Khaibari	0	0	0	1	1
Total					50	16	3	11	80

Last Updated: 16 May 2019

=== Clean sheets ===
Rank	No.	Pos	Nat	Name	Pro League	King's Cup	Arab Club Champions Cup	Champions League	Total
1	1	GK	(Australia)	Brad Jones	11	3	0	1	15
2	33	GK	(Saudi Arabia)	Waleed Abdullah	2	0	0	0	2
3	22	GK	(Saudi Arabia)	Abdullah Al-Owaishir	0	1	0	0	1
3	31	GK	(Saudi Arabia)	Zaid Al-Bawardi	0	0	0	1	1
Total					13	4	0	2	19

Last Updated: 29 May 2019
