= 2014 Saudi Super Cup =

2014 Saudi Super Cup كأس السوبر السعودي 2014
Al-Nassr	Al-Shabab
1	1
- After extra time Al-Shabab won 4–3 on penalties
- Date: 7 August 2014
- Venue: King Fahd International Stadium, Riyadh
- Referee: Fahd-Al Mirdasi
- Attendance: 31,000

The 2014 Saudi Super Cup was the second edition of the Saudi Super Cup, an annual Saudi football match contested by the winners of the previous season's Saudi Pro League and the King Cup.

The match was played on 7 August 2014 between Al-Nassr, the winners of the 2013–14 Saudi Pro League, and Al-Shabab, the winners of the 2014 King Cup. It was held at the King Fahd International Stadium in Riyadh, Saudi Arabia.

The match ended 1–1 after regular time and was decided by a penalty shoot-out, in which Al-Shabab prevailed 4–3 to win their first Saudi Super Cup title.

== Match details ==
7 August 2014
17:45 SAST

Al-Nassr	1–1 (a.e.t.)	Al-Shabab
Al-Sahlawi 12'	Report	Hazazi 20'
Penalties
Abdulghani (penalty scored); Al-Shehri (penalty scored); Sharahili (penalty scored); Khamis (penalty missed); Al-Raheb (penalty missed)	3–4	(penalty scored) Al-Marshedi; (penalty scored) Rogerinho; (penalty scored) Al-Bishi; (penalty missed) Diagne; (penalty scored) Fallatah

King Fahd International Stadium, Riyadh
Attendance: 31,000
Referee: Fahd Al-Mirdasi

Assistant referees: Abdullah Al-Shalwai, Ahmed Fakihi
Fourth official: Bader Al-Anazi
