= Khalil Khamis =

Khalil Khamis may refer to:

- Khalil Khamis (footballer, born 1992), Emirati association football player
- Khalil Khamis (footballer, born 1995), Lebanese association football player
