= Nawaf Al-Shenashini =

Saudi Arabian footballer

Nawaf Al-Shenashini نواف الشنيشني
Personal information
- Full name: Nawaf Meshaal Al-Shenashini
- Date of birth: 3 January 1996 (age 30)
- Place of birth: Saudi Arabia
- Height: 1.80 m (5 ft 11 in)
- Position: Forward

Team information
- Current team: Al-Nairyah
- Number: 44

Youth career
- –2017: Al-Nassr

Senior career*
Years	Team	Apps	(Gls)
2017–2018	Al-Nassr	2	(0)
2019	Al-Ansar	-	(3)
2019–	Al-Nairyah	-	(1)
- * Club domestic league appearances and goals

Nawaf Al-Shenashini (Arabic: نواف الشنيشني, born 3 January 1999) is a Saudi Arabian professional footballer who plays as a forward for Al-Nairyah.

== Career ==
Al-Shenashini started his career at Al-Nassr and is a product of the Al-Nassr's youth system. On 4 May 2017, Al-Shenashini made his professional debut for Al-Nassr against Al-Hilal in the Pro League, replacing Shaye Ali Sharahili . On 17 January 2019, Al-Shenashini left Al-Nassr and signed MS League side Al-Ansar. On 1 October 2019, Al-Shenashini left Al-Ansar and signed Saudi Third Division side Al-Nairyah.

== Career statistics ==
=== Club ===
As of match played 13 July 2020

Club	Season	League		King Cup		Asia		Other		Total	
Club	Season	Apps	Goals	Apps	Goals	Apps	Goals	Apps	Goals	Apps	Goals
Al-Nassr	2016–17	1	0	0	0	—			—	1	0
Al-Nassr	2017–18	1	0	0	0	0	0	1 (Note: Appearances in Arab Club Championship)	0	2	0
Al-Nassr	Total	2	0	0	0	0	0	1	0	3	0
Career totals		2	0	0	0	0	0	1	0	3	0
