= Waleed Abdullah =

Saudi Arabian footballer (born 1986)

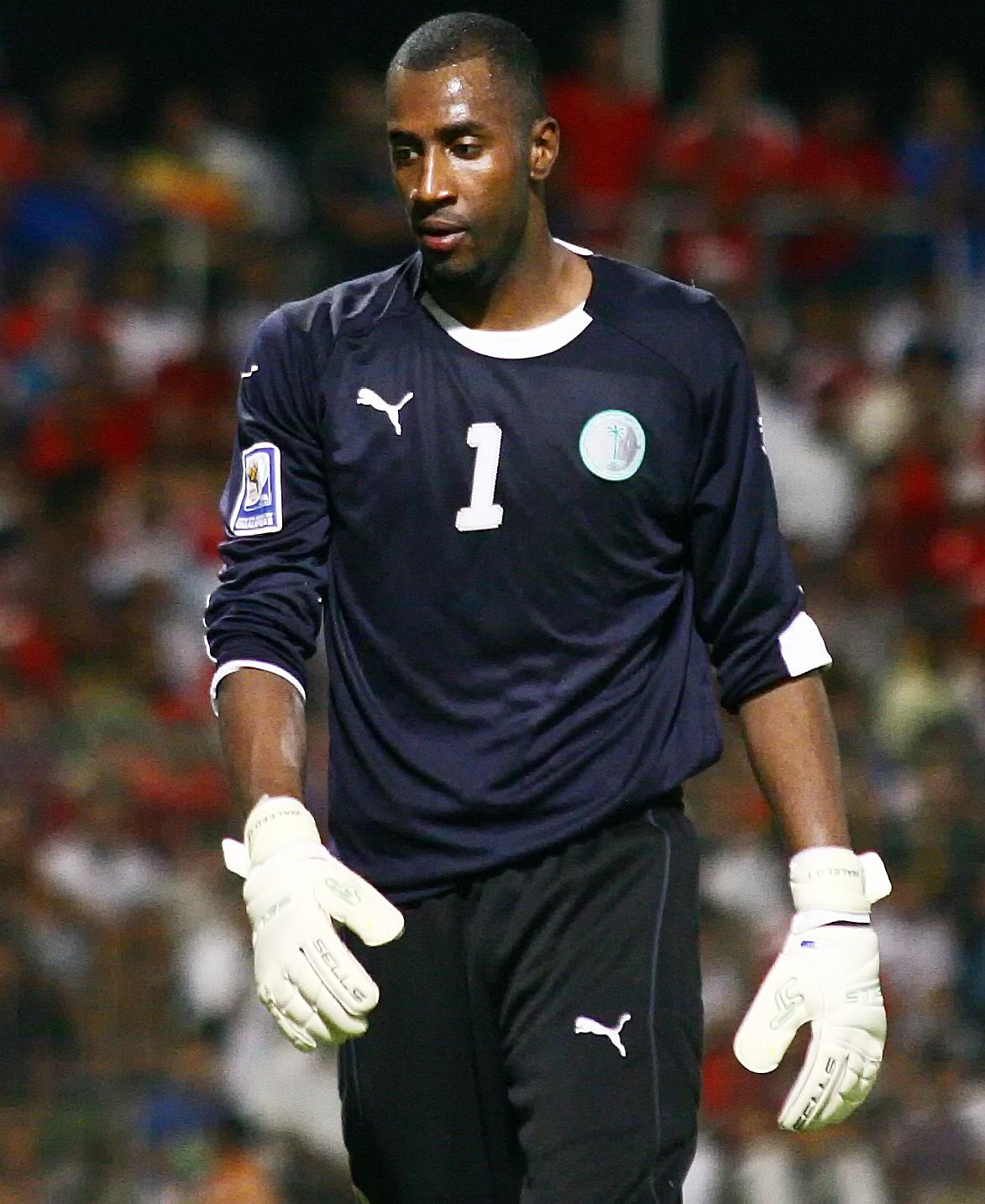
- Abdullah playing for Saudi Arabia in 2009

Personal information
- Full name: Waleed Abdullah Ali Al-Dawsari
- Date of birth: 19 April 1986 (age 40)
- Place of birth: Riyadh, Saudi Arabia
- Height: 1.96 m (6 ft 5 in)
- Position: Goalkeeper

Team information
- Current team: Al-Diriyah
- Number: 33

Youth career
- Al-Shabab

Senior career*
Years	Team	Apps	(Gls)
2006–2017	Al-Shabab	173	(0)
2017–2024	Al-Nassr	64	(0)
2024–	Al-Diriyah	24	(0)

International career^{‡}
2006–2007	Saudi Arabia U-23	11	(0)
2007–2019	Saudi Arabia	72	(0)
- * Club domestic league appearances and goals as of 25 August 2026 ‡ National team caps and goals as of 20:12, 28 February 2018 (UTC)

Waleed Abdullah Ali Al-Dawsari (Arabic: وَلِيد عَبْد الله عَلِيّ الدَّوْسَرِيّ; born 19 April 1986) is a Saudi Arabian professional footballer who plays as a goalkeeper for Saudi Pro League club Al-Diriyah.

A former regular for Saudi Arabia at Under-23 level, Abdullah made his senior international debut in July 2007 and was recognized as Saudi Arabia's first-choice goalkeeper from 2008 to 2014. He gained 72 caps and was selected in Saudi Arabia's squads for four AFC Asian Cups.

== Club career ==
Waleed Abdullah began playing on a regular basis with Al-Shabab in the 2007–08 season. In the 2006–07 season, he was with the Saudi Olympic team in their qualifiers, so he had no chance of playing with Al-Shabab as their first goalkeeper.

On 3 February 2017, Abdullah joined Al-Nassr on a free transfer. On 4 February 2020, he renewed his contract with Al-Nassr for another three years.

On 16 July 2024, Waleed Abdullah joined Saudi Second Division League side Al-Diriyah.

== International career ==
=== Olympic Team ===
Waleed Abdullah played 11 games with the Olympic team during the 2008 Qualifiers, in which he helped the team reach the second round, and was close to qualifying had they won against Japan in Tokyo in the last game. Waleed's best game was against Japan in Tokyo, where he stopped many Japanese attacks and stopped the Japanese from scoring.

=== Senior team ===
Waleed first joined the Saudi Arabia national football team for the AFC Asian Cup 2007. His first official game was a friendly against United Arab Emirates in June 2007, which ended 2-0 for Saudi Arabia. He also played another friendly against Oman, and it ended 1-1. Right before the beginning of the Asian Cup, Waleed received news of the death of his infant daughter. But he decided to stay with the national team, and was one of the players in Saudi Arabia's squad in the Asian Cup, but didn't get any playtime during the cup itself.

After the Asian Cup he was called up a couple of times, for a friendly against Ghana which ended 5-0 for Saudi Arabia, and the 2010 World Cup Qualifiers against Singapore which ended 2–0, and for the Uzbekistan qualifier on 26 March 2008.

== Career statistics ==
=== Club ===
As of 31 May 2024.

Appearances and goals by club, season and competition
Club	Season	League		King Cup		Crown Prince Cup (Note: Discontinued in September 19, 2017)		Continental		Other		Total	
Club	Season	Apps	Goals	Apps	Goals	Apps	Goals	Apps	Goals	Apps	Goals	Apps	Goals
Al-Shabab	2006–07	1	0	—		0	0	0	0	—		1	0
Al-Shabab	2007–08	5	0	4	0	3	0	—		2 (Note: Appearances in Arab Club Champions Cup)	0	14	0
Al-Shabab	2008–09	17	0	5	0	4	0	5	0	—		31	0
Al-Shabab	2009–10	19	0	4	0	3	0	10	0	—		36	0
Al-Shabab	2010–11	24	0	2	0	1	0	7	0	—		34	0
Al-Shabab	2011–12	26	0	0	0	2	0	—		—		28	0
Al-Shabab	2012–13	22	0	5	0	0	0	10	0	—		37	0
Al-Shabab	2013–14	24	0	5	0	2	0	7	0	—		38	0
Al-Shabab	2014–15	17	0	0	0	0	0	3	0	1 (Note: Appearances in Saudi Super Cup)	0	21	0
Al-Shabab	2015–16	5	0	2	0	0	0	—		—		7	0
Al-Shabab	2016–17	13	0	0	0	1	0	—		—		14	0
Al-Shabab	Total	173	0	27	0	16	0	42	0	3	0	261	0
Al-Nassr	2016–17	7	0	1	0	0	0	—		—		8	0
Al-Nassr	2017–18	20	0	0	0	—		—		2	0	22	0
Al-Nassr	2018–19	7	0	0	0	—		2	0	2	0	11	0
Al-Nassr	2019–20	0	0	1	0	—		1	0	0	0	2	0
Al-Nassr	2020–21	6	0	0	0	—		4	0	0	0	10	0
Al-Nassr	2021–22	20	0	2	0	—		3	0	0	0	25	0
Al-Nassr	2022–23	0	0	0	0	—		0	0	0	0	0	0
Al-Nassr	2023–24	4	0	1	0	—		1	0	0	0	6	0
Al-Nassr	Total	64	0	5	0	0	0	11	0	4	0	84	0
Career total		237	0	32	0	16	0	53	0	7	0	345	0

=== International ===
Statistics accurate as of match played 28 February 2018.

Saudi Arabia
Year	Apps	Goals
2007	1	0
2008	10	0
2009	19	0
2010	6	0
2011	8	0
2012	3	0
2013	9	0
2014	9	0
2015	3	0
2016	1	0
2017	2	0
2018	1	0
Total	72	0

== Honours ==
=== Club ===
Al-Shabab

- Saudi Pro League: 2011–12
- King's Cup: 2008, 2009, 2014
- Saudi Super Cup: 2014
- Federation Cup: 2008–09, 2009–10

Al-Nassr

- Saudi Pro League: 2018–19
- Saudi Super Cup: 2019, 2020
- Arab Club Champions Cup: 2023
