= Al-Nairyah Club =

Association football club in Saudi Arabia

Al-Nairyah SC
- Full name: Al-Nairyah Sports Club
- Founded: 1977; 49 years ago
- Ground: Al Nairyah
- Chairman: Mohammed Al-Mutairi
- Manager: Maher Guizani
- League: Second Division
- 2020–21: Third Division, 2nd of 32 (promoted)
Home colours	Away colours

Al-Nairyah Sports Club (Arabic: نادي النعيرية الرياضي) is a Saudi Arabian football club based in Al Nairyah, Eastern Province and competes in the Saudi Second Division, the third tier of Saudi football. The club was founded in 1977 and its current president is Mohammed Al-Mutairi. Al-Nairyah won their first promotion to the Saudi Second Division during the 2020–21 season after reaching the semi-finals of the Saudi Third Division. The club also consists of two other departments, table tennis and volleyball.

== Current squad ==
As of 1 August 2021

Note: Flags indicate national team as defined under FIFA eligibility rules; some limited exceptions apply. Players may hold more than one non-FIFA nationality.

No.	Pos.	Nation	Player
1	GK	KSA	Mansour Al-Dossari
3	DF	KSA	Fahad Al-Shammari
6	MF	MTN	Cheikh Saadné
7	MF	TUN	Maher Boulabiar
8	MF	KSA	Haitham Al-Khulaif
10	MF	KSA	Nawaf Al-Rajhi
11	MF	KSA	Mohammed Al-Musabbeh
14	MF	KSA	Sultan Al-Anazi
15	MF	KSA	Abdulmajeed Obaid
17	DF	KSA	Jamal Al-Dhefiri
18	FW	KSA	Abdulaziz Al-Hassani
19	DF	KSA	Badr Al-Enezi

No.	Pos.	Nation	Player
20	MF	KSA	Muhannad Barnawi
21	DF	KSA	Haider Al-Thunayan
22	DF	KSA	Mortadha Wahkhik
24	DF	TUN	Bassem Dali
27	FW	KSA	Hamza Al-Moosa
44	MF	KSA	Nawaf Al-Shenashini
49	DF	KSA	Ali Al-Nakhli
73	GK	KSA	Mohammed Al-Moqahwi
74	GK	KSA	Ahmed Al-Bloushi
77	MF	KSA	Abdulaziz Al-Sibyani
98	FW	CIV	Koné Mory

== See also ==
- List of football clubs in Saudi Arabia
