= Ibrahim Ghaleb =

Saudi Arabian footballer

Ibrahim Mohammed Ghaleb Jahshan
Personal information
- Date of birth: 28 September 1990 (age 36)
- Place of birth: Ras Tanura, Saudi Arabia
- Height: 1.74 m (5 ft 9 in)
- Position: Defensive midfielder

Youth career
- 2006–2008: Al-Nassr

Senior career*
Years	Team	Apps	(Gls)
2008–2019	Al-Nassr	182	(7)
2019	Al-Faisaly	0	(0)

International career^{‡}
2006	Saudi Arabia U-17	1	(0)
2008–2011	Saudi Arabia U-20	5	(1)
2009–2019	Saudi Arabia	22	(0)
- * Club domestic league appearances and goals as of 26 December 2016 ‡ National team caps and goals as of 12 January 2019

Ibrahim Mohammed Ghaleb Jahshan (Arabic: إبراهيم محمد غالب جحشان; born 28 September 1990) is a Saudi Arabian footballer. He is one of the longest serving free agents in football history. Having been one since losing his place at Al-Faisalay in 2019.

== Club career ==
Ghaleb joined the Al-Nassr U-17 team in the summer of 2006. As he was under the scouts' eyes, Al-Nassr U-17 team manager, Nasir AlKanani, succeeded in including Ghaleb in his talent U-17 squad. Not surprisingly, with his accurate passes and mature look in the first year, Ghaleb did not take a long time to get promoted to the first team. His first appearance was in the middle of the 2008/2009 season when the Argentine Edgardo Bauza picked him for the line-up in a match against arch-rival Al Hilal. These kinds of games were considered to be tough for a young 17-year-old player. However, Ghaleb surprised spectators with his talent by keeping control of the ball and making accurate passes. Since then, he has assured his position in the squad.

On 8 March 2010, Ghaleb signed with a couple of other young talented players, the first professional contract in his career with Al-Nassr ending in 2015.

== International career ==
He made his debut for Saudi Arabia national team on 14 October 2010. He participated in the middle of the second half in an international friendly against Tunisia.

== Career statistics ==
=== Club ===
As of match played 17 May 2019

Club	Season	League		King Cup		Asia		Other		Total	
Club	Season	Apps	Goals	Apps	Goals	Apps	Goals	Apps	Goals	Apps	Goals
Al Nassr	2008–09	7	0	0	0	—		0	0	7	0
Al Nassr	2009–10	21	0	2	0	—		1 (Note: Appearances in Crown Prince Cup)	0	24	0
Al Nassr	2010–11	23	1	1	0	7	0	3	0	34	1
Al Nassr	2011–12	17	0	4	0	—		2	0	23	0
Al Nassr	2012–13	25	0	2	1	—		3	0	30	1
Al Nassr	2013–14	23	2	1	0	—		3	0	27	2
Al Nassr	2014–15	16	3	0	0	2	0	3 (Note: Two appearances in Crown Prince Cup and one in Super Cup)	0	21	3
Al Nassr	2015–16	8	1	2	1	5	1	1 (Note: Appearances in Super Cup)	0	16	3
Al Nassr	2016–17	10	0	2	0	—		2	0	14	0
Al Nassr	2017–18	21	0	1	0	—		—		22	0
Al Nassr	2018–19	11	0	0	0	0	0	3 (Note: Appearances in Arab Club Champions Cup)	0	14	0
Al Nassr	Total	182	7	15	0	14	1	21	0	232	8
Al-Faisaly	2019–20	0	0	0	0	—		—		0	0
Career totals		182	7	15	0	14	1	21	0	232	8

== Honours ==
=== Club ===
Al Nassr

- Saudi Professional League: 2013–14, 2014–15, 2018–19
- Saudi Crown Prince Cup: 2013–14
- Saudi Federation Cup 2007/08

=== Individual ===
- Saudi Professional League Youth Player of the season 2009–10.
