= Ibrahim Hazzazi =

Saudi Arabian footballer

Personal information
- Full name: Ibrahim Ahmad Taib Hazzazi
- Date of birth: November 22, 1986 (age 39)
- Place of birth: Jeddah, Saudi Arabia
- Height: 1.78 m (5 ft 10 in)
- Position: Defender

Youth career
- 2002–2005: Al-Ahli

Senior career*
Years	Team	Apps	(Gls)
2005–2011	Al-Ahli	122	(4)
2012–2013	Al-Ittihad	16	(1)
2013–2014	Ettifaq FC		
2014–2015	Al-Orobah F.C.		
2015	Najran SC		
2017–2018	Jeddah		

International career
2007–2009	Saudi Arabia	9	(0)
- * Club domestic league appearances and goals

Ibrahim Ahmad Taib Hazzazi (Arabic: ابراهيم احمد طيب هزازي; born 22 November 1986) is a former Saudi Arabian footballer. He is the brother of striker Naif Hazazi.

== Club career ==
Hazzazi spent his entire career playing domestically. His notable clubs are Al-Ahli and Al-Ittihad.

== International career ==
He played for Saudi Arabia at the AFC Asian Cup 2007.

== Honours ==
=== Al-Ahli (Jeddah) ===
- Saudi Crown Prince Cup: 2007
- Saudi Champions Cup: 2011

=== National team ===
2007 AFC Asian Cup: Runner-up
