= Ayman Ftayni =

Saudi Arabian footballer

Personal information
- Full name: Ayman Abdullah Ftayni Ali
- Date of birth: 27 December 1994 (age 31)
- Place of birth: Riyadh, Saudi Arabia
- Height: 1.78 m (5 ft 10 in)
- Position: Midfielder

Team information
- Current team: Al-Muzahimiyyah
- Number: 14

Youth career
- 2010–2012: Al-Nassr

Senior career*
Years	Team	Apps	(Gls)
2012–2017	Al-Nassr	15	(0)
2015	→ Al Khaleej (loan)	2	(0)
2016–2017	→ Al-Raed (loan)	11	(0)
2017–2018	Ohod	16	(1)
2018–2019	Al-Orobah	6	(0)
2019–2020	Hetten		
2020–2021	Al-Orobah	23	(1)
2021–2022	Al-Riyadh		
2022–2023	Al-Jandal		
2023	Al-Nairyah		
2023–2025	Mudhar		
2025–	Al-Muzahimiyyah		
- * Club domestic league appearances and goals as of 15:07, 22 August 2014 (UTC)

Ayman Ftayni (Arabic: ايمن فتيني; born 27 December 1994 in Riyadh) is a Saudi football player who currently plays as a midfielder for Al-Muzahimiyyah.
