= Al Nairyah =

Governorate in Eastern Province, Saudi Arabia

Al-Nairyah النعيرية
- Governorate
- Location of Al-Nairyah within the Eastern Province

- Location of Al-Nairyah within Saudi Arabia
- Coordinates: 27°28′11″N 48°29′10″E
- Country: Saudi Arabia
- Province: Eastern Province

Government
  - Type: Municipality
  - Body: Al-Nairyah Municipality

Area
  - Total: 16,800 km^{2} (6,500 sq mi)

Population (2022)
  - Total: 63,815
  - Density: 3.80/km^{2} (9.84/sq mi)
- Time zone: UTC+03:00 (SAST)
- Area code: 013

Al-Nairyah (Arabic: النعيرية) is one of the governorates in Eastern Province, Saudi Arabia.

== See also ==
- Provinces of Saudi Arabia
- List of islands of Saudi Arabia
- List of governorates of Saudi Arabia
- List of cities and towns in Saudi Arabia
