= Ahmad Akash =

Saudi Arabian footballer

Personal information
- Full name: Ahmad Akash Walbi
- Date of birth: August 27, 1990 (age 36)
- Place of birth: Dammam, Saudi Arabia
- Height: 1.80 m (5 ft 11 in)
- Position: Left back

Youth career
- 2006–2009: Ettifaq FC

Senior career*
Years	Team	Apps	(Gls)
2009–2015	Ettifaq FC	95	(2)
2015–2020	Al-Nassr	17	(1)
2020–2021	Al-Kawkab	0	(0)

International career^{‡}
2012–	Saudi Arabia	2	(0)
- * Club domestic league appearances and goals as of 26 December 2016 ‡ National team caps and goals as of 26 December 2016

Ahmad Akash Walbi (Arabic: أحمد عكاش والبي) is a football player who plays as a left back. He has been capped twice for the Saudi Arabia national team.

He joined Al-Nasr in the winter of 2015, having left the Ettifaq FC club of Dammam.
