= Naif Hazazi (footballer, born 1988) =

Saudi Arabian footballer

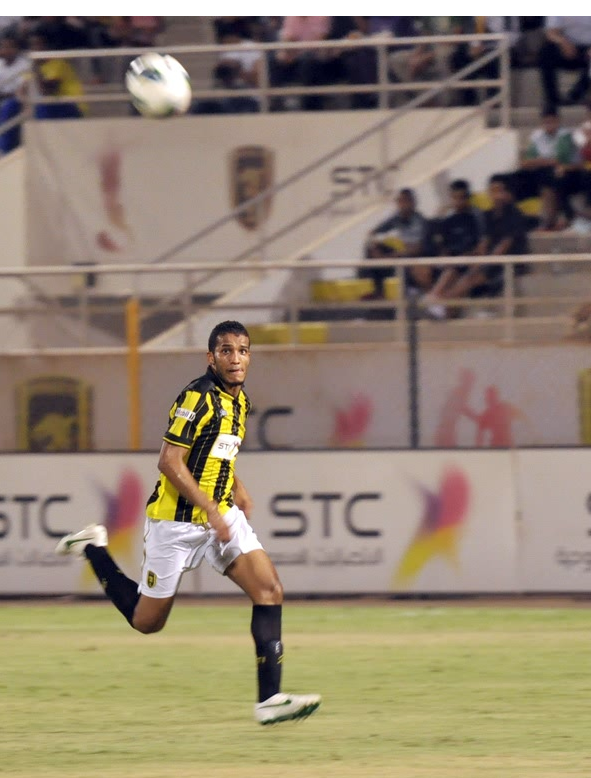

Personal information
- Full name: Naif Ahmad Hazazi
- Date of birth: 27 July 1988 (age 38)
- Place of birth: Jeddah, Saudi Arabia
- Height: 1.83 m (6 ft 0 in)
- Position: Striker

Team information
- Current team: Al-Wadi
- Number: 9

Youth career
- 2000–2006: Al-Ittihad

Senior career*
Years	Team	Apps	(Gls)
2006–2013	Al-Ittihad	82	(32)
2013–2015	Al-Shabab	27	(21)
2015–2017	Al-Nassr	34	(6)
2017–2018	Al-Taawoun	9	(2)
2018	Botoșani	1	(0)
2018	Ohod	3	(0)
2020	Al-Adalah	10	(2)
2024–	Al-Wadi	0	(0)

International career^{‡}
2006–2008	Saudi Arabia U23	10	(3)
2008–2016	Saudi Arabia	54	(15)
Medal record
Al-Ittihad
Winner	SPL	2007
Runner-up	SPL	2008
Runner-up	Saudi Champions Cup	2008
Winner	SPL	2009
Runner-up	Saudi Champions Cup	2009
Runner-up	AFC Champions League	2009
Runner-up	SPL	2010
Winner	Saudi Champions Cup	2010
Runner-up	SPL	2011
Runner-up	Saudi Champions Cup	2011
Winner	Saudi Champions Cup	2013
Al-Shabab
Winner	Saudi Champions Cup	2014
Winner	Super Cup	2014
- * Club domestic league appearances and goals as of 9 September 2020 ‡ National team caps and goals as of 21:22, 11 October 2016 (UTC)

Naif Ahmad Hazazi (Arabic: نايف أحمد هزازي; born 27 July 1988), also nicknamed Al Saqr which means The Falcon, is a Saudi Arabian professional footballer, who plays for Al-Wadi as a striker former the Saudi Arabia national team.

== Personal life ==
Hazazi lives in Jeddah. He used to be engaged to Yemeni singer Balqees Ahmed Fathi. However, they are no longer engaged.

== Career ==
=== Al-Ittihad ===
Naif began his career at the Al-Ittihad he was playing for the Al-Ittihad Under-17, but because his forward talent, the Belgian coach Dimitri Davidovic included him to the first team, He Received an offer from Club Sevilla when he was at International travels, about admiration for his performance, But the deal failed to reject the coach Manuel Jose to keep him with the team.

==== 2006–08 ====
Hazazi was promoted to the first team in 2006. On 25 January 2007, he made his debut with the first team against Al Nassr in the Prince Faisal Cup.

On 1 December 2007, Hazazi made his league debut as a late-match substitute against Al-Hilal. Against Syrian Ittihad-Aleppo, he scored a header in the 42nd minute the second of 3 goals ending the match 3-0 in favor of Al-Ittihad.

==== 2008–09 season ====
Upon Hamzah's departure from the club, Hazazi inherited his number 9 jersey. During the 2008-09 season, Hazazi established himself as a regular first team player. Hazazi usually entered as a reserve player, On 12 October, First match for Hazazi as a key player. He scored the first goal in the match against Al-Shabab en route to a 2–1 victory. Hazazi caused of first goal in the game by assist to Hicham Aboucherouane to score against Al-Ahli. Emerged his skills, especially, when he scored 2 goals against Al-Watani in a 7–2 victory.

He has the advantage is not on the level of our stadiums, but in the Arab world, which have great header ability as typical model.

— Majed Abdullah

Hazazi also scored the second goal in the 43rd minute against Al-Shabab in a 4–0 win.

On 12 April, the final match for Al-Ittihad on the season versus Al-Hilal, Hazazi opened match with one goal in the 18th minute and finished 2–1. He won his first title league with Al-Ittihad. On 11 May in an away Champions Cup-match, he scored one goal against Al-Hazm as the only goal in the match to make the difference 1–0. On 15 May, he played against Al-Shabab without help to make the victory. He lost 0–4 from Al-Shabab. Hazazi Replaced Renato on AFC Champions League match against Esteghlal. He also played against Al-Jazira, He played against Umm-Salal SC full match and he scored a hat-trick of 7–0. Round of 16, he played against Al-Shabab, He making the ball to teammate Hicham Aboucherouane to Ssore the second goal in the game.

==== 2009–10 season ====
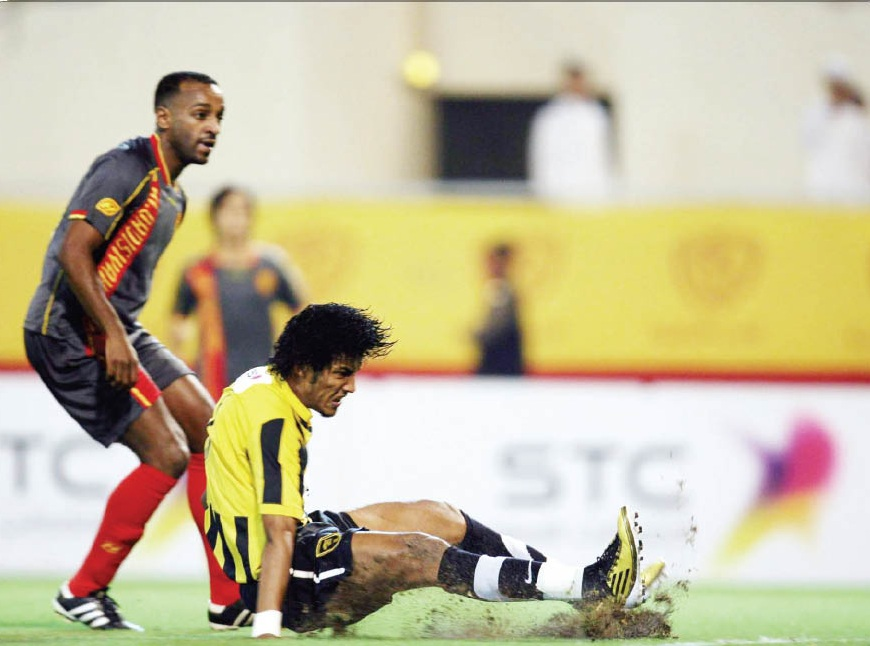
Hazazi falling on the pitch in Al-Qadasiya 0–0 match.

He played twice games without any goal. On 26 August, he played against Al-Qadasiya and scored hat-trick on 7–1 won, to become the second hat-trick in his history. Hazazi has been injured in this season by cruciate ligament. On 28 April, was the comeback match against Zob Ahan, and entered as a substitute in the second half after its improved. On 3 May, Hazazi entered as a reserve on the late minutes, he scored a goal to converted to beat Al-Shabab on last 10 minutes. He played also on the final as a reserve against Al-Hilal he won his first title Champions Cup by penalties finished 5–4.

==== 2010–11 season ====
In the 2010–11 season, Hazazi scored 12 in 22 matches in the league, In all completions scoring 18 in 39 matches, including 6 matches without any goal in Champions League. On 14 August 2010, Hazazi scored his first goal for the season against Al-Ettifaq, with a strange shot passed through the goalkeeper hands. He scored against Najran SC on Round 4. On 29 August, Hazazi make the third hat-trick in his history against Al-Hazm in a 4–0 won, He assist the 4th goal. He assists the first goal against Al-Ahli, Hazazi replaced in the second half and entered Mohammed Noor because of injury influence. Hazazi played against Al-Raed, He scored the first goal after a powerful shot from outside the penalty area. ended 2-1. Hazazi scored the only goal of his team against Al-Qadasiya and scored another goal correctly ruled out for offside. He scored 2 goals on a match against Al-Shabab but the match ended 2–2. He played against Al Nassr and received the red card before match end, His response was a smile on referee. Hazazi played as a reserve against Al-Faisaly, This is the first time on the season plays as a reserve. He played against Al-Raed, he scored the first goal and caused a penalty kick will be the third goal, that Mabrouk Zaid scored it. Played against Al-Wahda, he scored the second goal to make it 2–1. On 15 May, he played the last match of the season against Al-Shabab, Hazazi assist to Mohammed Noor to score the first goal, match is ended 1–1. On Champions Cup. He assist the tie-goal, by passing to Mohammed Al-Rashid against Al Nassr on away. On Home-match, he scored the tie-goal and qualifying goal. He scored against Al-Hilal a tie-goal, ended 1–1. Hazazi played on the final as a reserve against Al-Ahli, he lost the final by penalties 2–4.

==== 2011–12 season ====
Hazazi began his season with 2 goals against Al-Ansar, scored two goals, and hat-trick goal was canceled. In an ACL home match against Jeonbuk Motors FC, he scored two goals in the first 20 minutes. He lost 3–2. In Away, Hazazi received a red card by the referee in the first minutes. He lost 5–3 in aggregate to Jeonbuk Motors FC. against Al-Shabab, He score the second goal from a penalty. He plays against Al Fateh with a loss 1–2. in Jeddah derby, he lost 3–1 from Al Ahli. Hazazi score the second goal against Al Nasser to win 3–1 in Riyadh, in Away against Al Hilal, score goal from header in last minutes in the second half, to change the match to tie. After landing for the first time this season to sixth place, Hazazi called Ittihad Jeddah to sign his brother Ibrahim to club, who plays for Al Ahli. the supporters of the club criticized Hazazi career by problem called Fasting of the scoring, After he moved away from score in the league and competitions. the goal against Al-Faisaly was the comeback goal, Hazazi celebrated after Went bad luck with him. Hazazi scored his first historical goal against Al Ahli, and was the only goal in the game and the winning goal, which caused move Al Ahli away from top of the league. On 20 March 2012, He score two goals against Al-Arabi and received a yellow card for Get out from the stadium and celebrate with club supporters. On 2 May 2012, Hazazi broke Hamza Idris record in Asian Tournaments when he scored his 10th goal against Pakhtakor. Hazazi confirmed the difficulty of the game and said:

This is our response to those who doubted our ability.

On 23 May 2012, He played against Persepolis with a 3–0 won, he scored the first goal from penalty kick, which caused by teammate Faouzi. and also was injured during the match which he continued the match to the 60th minute till he has been substituted, the tests results proved that injury is a broke of his nose that keep him away for two months.

== International career ==
Naif made his international debut at the age of 19, in a friendly against Thailand and score the first goal in his international career in 65th minute. Hazazi also scored two goals in a 4–0 friendly win over Bahrain. On 30 August 2009, he played a friendly match against Malaysia and injured his cruciate ligament, which kept him out of action for a period of time.

=== 2010 World Cup qualification ===
He was part of the 2010 Saudi Qualification squad. He appeared in the fourth round in the tournament with Malek Mouath and Yasser Al-Qahtani. Hazazi was able to be in the starting line-up after coach Jose Peseiro decided to rule out Al Qahtani for the qualifiers against Iran and the United Arab Emirates for disciplinary reasons. Al Qahtani's loss was Hazazi's gain, However, the youngster able to make his second qualifying appearance in Tehran against Iran. With only 11 minutes remaining, Hazazi calmly converted the equaliser that ignited one of his country's most famous comebacks in a 2–1 victory. On 1 April 2009 against United Arab Emirates in Riyadh, Saudis were again trailing in the second half and, despite gaining a fortuitous equaliser through an own goal, Hazazi was a symbol of luck to qualify before the end of the match five minutes with the Winning Golden Header.

=== 2011 AFC Asian Cup ===
On 9 January 2011, Hazazi in first official match in Asian competition in 1–2 loss against Syria, he entered in 56th minute as substitute in bad experience. He tried to help the attack to score but couldn't against Jordan with a 0–1 loss. in the third match, Motaz Al Mosa came on as a substitute for Naif in the 46th minute, Hazazi apologized for ignoring the sports channels after the end of the game with Japan which ended 0–5 loss.

=== 2015 AFC Asian Cup ===
Hazazi was included in Cosmin Olăroiu's final squad for 2015 AFC Asian Cup, ruling as central forward after the injury of 2014 Asian Footballer of the Year Nasser Al-Shamrani. He started Saudi Arabia's opening match against China, missing from a penalty kick in the 62nd minute as the Saudis lost 1–0. In the team's second match, Hazazi scored the equalising goal in an eventual 4–1 victory over North Korea.

== Style of play ==
He has speed, talent and he can score in any situation. If he continues to develop at this rate, he will soon be one of Asia's top players.

— Mohammed Noor, speaking about Hazazi

Hazazi showed interest and skill in football at a young age. Hazazi has been compared to Chelsea striker Didier Drogba, has also been referred to as a classic centre forward, owing to his excellent heading ability and his spirit. He is known for his header throws. He is perceived to be a very spirited footballer. He has a special celebration which performs after a goal.

== Outside football ==
Hazazi was awarded Al-Riyadia's the most popular footballer. He signed a four-year deal with Nike in Dubai to appear in the first advertisement for Nike in the Middle East. Nike selected Hazazi based on his achievements with club and his country despite his young age. He has also signed other sponsorships with Soccertown and Red Bull on 31 May 2012.

He is known for his charitable work and became Arab Childhood Ambassador. He and the club owners visited the Abdulateef Jamil Hospital, making a tour of various hospital alongside Osama Al-Muwallad.

He also participated in a documentary film at King Abdulaziz University in Jeddah, about the dangers of smoking.

In October 2012, he got engaged to Yemeni-Emarati singer Balqees Ahmed Fathi.

== Career statistics ==
=== Club ===
As of match played 9 September 2020

Club	Season	League		National Cup		League Cup		Continental		Other		Total	
Club	Season	Apps	Goals	Apps	Goals	Apps	Goals	Apps	Goals	Apps	Goals	Apps	Goals
Al-Ittihad	2007–08	1	0	0	0	0	0	1	1	—		2	1
Al-Ittihad	2008–09	19	9	5	2	1	0	5	3	—		30	14
Al-Ittihad	2009–10	3	3	2	1	0	0	1	0	—		6	4
Al-Ittihad	2010–11	22	12	5	2	2	2	10	2	—		39	18
Al-Ittihad	2011–12	19	7	2	1	3	2	10	8	—		34	18
Al-Ittihad	2012–13	18	1	2	2	1	0	—		—		21	3
Al-Ittihad	Total	82	32	16	8	7	4	27	14	0	0	132	58
Al-Shabab	2013–14	10	7	0	0	0	0	2	1	—		12	8
Al-Shabab	2014–15	17	14	0	0	2	1	4	2	1 (Note: Appearances in Saudi Super Cup)	1	24	18
Al-Shabab	Total	27	21	0	0	2	1	6	3	1	1	36	26
Al-Nassr	2015–16	18	3	4	2	2	0	2	0	1	0	27	5
Al-Nassr	2016–17	16	3	2	2	2	0	—		—		20	5
Al-Nassr	Total	34	6	6	4	4	0	2	0	1	0	47	10
Al-Taawoun	2017–18	9	2	0	0	1	0	—		—		10	2
Botoșani	2017–18	1	0	0	0	—		—		—		1	0
Ohod	2018–19	3	0	0	0	—		—		—		3	0
Al-Adalah	2019–20	10	2	0	0	—		—		—		10	2
Career totals		166	63	22	12	14	5	35	17	2	1	239	98

=== International ===
As of 11 October 2016

National team	Season	Apps	Goals
Saudi Arabia	2008	4	3
Saudi Arabia	2009	8	3
Saudi Arabia	2010	5	0
Saudi Arabia	2011	10	1
Saudi Arabia	2012	2	0
Saudi Arabia	2013	6	3
Saudi Arabia	2014	7	3
Saudi Arabia	2015	7	2
Saudi Arabia	2016	5	0
Total		54	15

=== International goals ===
==== Under–23 ====
#	Date	Venue	Opponent	Score	Result	Competition
1	6 June 2007	Tehran, Iran	Iran	2–0	3–2	2008 Summer Olympics qualification
2	12 September 2007	Hanoi, Vietnam	Vietnam	1–1	1–1	2008 Summer Olympics qualification
3	28 December 2007	Riyadh, Saudi Arabia	Syria	1–1	1–3	Friendly

==== Senior team ====
Scores and results list Saudi Arabia's goal tally first.

#	Date	Venue	Opponent	Score	Result	Competition
1.	8 November 2008	King Fahd International Stadium, Riyadh, Saudi Arabia	Thailand	1–0	1–0	Friendly
2.	11 November 2008	King Fahd International Stadium, Riyadh, Saudi Arabia	Bahrain	2–0	4–0	Friendly
3.	11 November 2008	King Fahd International Stadium, Riyadh, Saudi Arabia	Bahrain	3–0	4–0	Friendly
4.	28 March 2009	Azadi Stadium, Tehran, Iran	Iran	1–1	2–1	2010 FIFA World Cup qualification
5.	1 April 2009	King Fahd International Stadium, Riyadh, Saudi Arabia	United Arab Emirates	3–2	3–2	2010 FIFA World Cup qualification
6.	4 June 2009	TEDA Football Stadium, Tianjin, China	China	3–1	4–1	Friendly
7.	11 November 2011	King Fahd International Stadium, Riyadh, Saudi Arabia	Thailand	1–0	3–0	2014 FIFA World Cup qualification
8.	6 February 2013	Prince Mohamed bin Fahd Stadium, Dammam, Saudi Arabia	China	2–1	2–1	2015 AFC Asian Cup qualification
9.	17 March 2013	Shah Alam Stadium, Shah Alam, Malaysia	Malaysia	3–1	4–1	Friendly
10.	9 September 2013	King Fahd International Stadium, Riyadh, Saudi Arabia	Trinidad and Tobago	1–2	1–3	Friendly
11.	10 October 2014	Prince Abdullah Al Faisal Stadium, Jeddah, Saudi Arabia	Uruguay	1–1	1–1	Friendly
12.	6 November 2014	Prince Mohammed bin Fahd Stadium, Dammam, Saudi Arabia	Palestine	1–0	2–0	Friendly
13.	30 December 2014	Simonds Stadium, Geelong, Australia	Bahrain	1–2	1–4	Friendly
14.	14 January 2015	Melbourne Rectangular Stadium, Melbourne, Australia	North Korea	1–1	4–1	2015 AFC Asian Cup
15.	17 November 2015	National Stadium, Dili, East Timor	Timor-Leste	9–0	10–0	2018 FIFA World Cup qualification

=== Career totals ===
Professional career totals
Teams	Appearances	Goals	Goals per game
Clubs	221	97	0.44
National team	54	15	0.28
Total	275	112	0.41

== Honours ==
Al-Ittihad

- Saudi Professional League: 2006–07, 2008–09
- King Cup of Champions: 2010, 2013

Al-Shabab

- King Cup of Champions: 2014
- Saudi Super Cup: 2014

Individual

- Saudi Forward of the Season: 2009
- Saudi Promising Player of the Year: 2009
- Most Popular Player in ME: 2010
