= Yahya Al-Shehri =

Saudi Arabian footballer (born 1990)

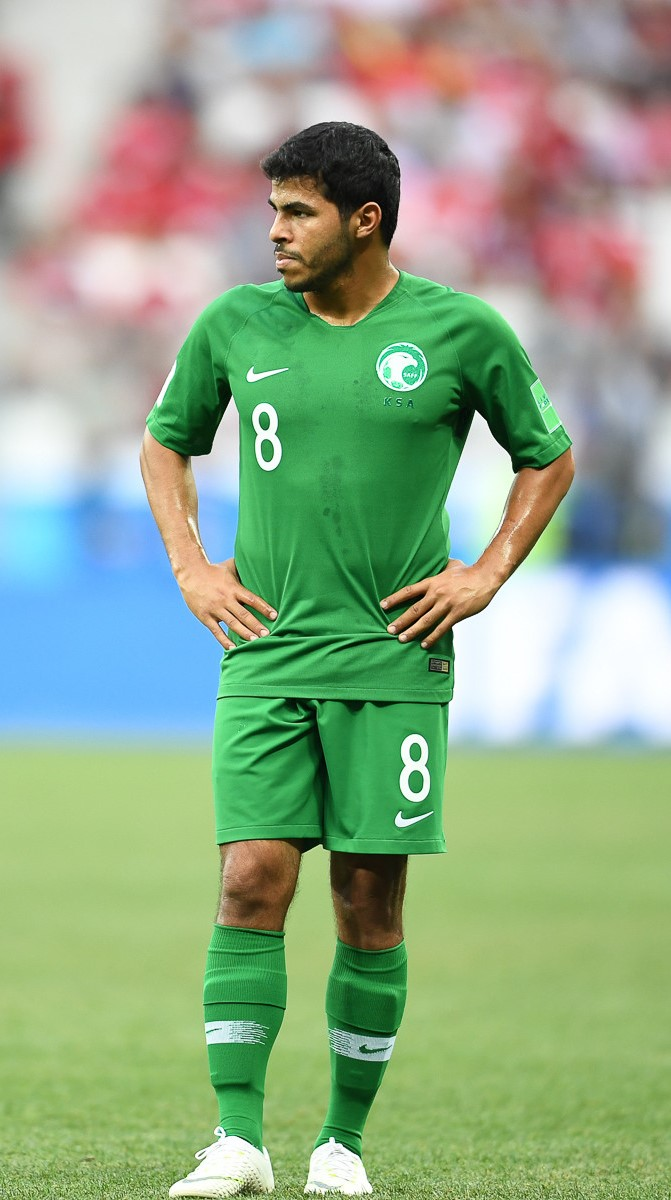
- Al-Shehri with Saudi Arabia at the 2018 FIFA World Cup

Personal information
- Full name: Yahya Sulaiman Ali Al-Shehri
- Date of birth: 26 June 1990 (age 36)
- Place of birth: Dammam, Saudi Arabia
- Height: 1.65 m (5 ft 5 in)
- Position: Attacking midfielder

Youth career
- 2006–2010: Ettifaq

Senior career*
Years	Team	Apps	(Gls)
2009–2013	Ettifaq	87	(7)
2013–2021	Al-Nassr	157	(19)
2018	→ Leganés (loan)	0	(0)
2021–2023	Al-Raed	36	(1)
2023–2026	Al-Riyadh	65	(1)

International career^{‡}
2009–2019	Saudi Arabia	75	(8)
- * Club domestic league appearances and goals as of 4 May 2026 ‡ National team caps and goals as of 20:15, 8 December 2019 (UTC)

Yahya Sulaiman Ali Al-Shehri (Arabic: يحيى سليمان علي الشهري; born 26 June 1990) is a Saudi Arabian professional footballer who plays as an attacking midfielder.

He was promoted from the youth team of Ettifaq and appeared in the first team in the 2009–10 Saudi Professional League. In 2013, he transferred to Al-Nassr. In 2018, he was loaned to CD Leganés and became one of the nine Saudi players to go abroad.

== Club career ==
On 1 June 2013, in the biggest deal in the history of Saudi football, Al-Shehri officially signed a contract to join Al-Nassr in return for 48 million Saudi Riyals.

On 19 August 2021, Al-Shehri joined Al-Raed.

On 22 October 2023, Al-Shehri joined Al-Riyadh on a free transfer. On 5 March 2026, he made his 345th Saudi Pro League appearance as a substitute in a 3–0 away defeat to Damac, becoming the all-time appearance record holder and surpassing the previous record set by Mohammed Al-Fuhaid.

== International career ==
Al-Shehri has been capped for the Saudi Arabia national team U-17s, U-18s, U-19s, U-20s and Under-21 side, and eventually for the first team. Yahya made his first appearance with the first Saudi team in a friendly match against Tunisia on 14 October 2009.

In May 2018, he was named in the Saudi Arabia senior national team's preliminary squad for the 2018 FIFA World Cup in Russia.

== Career statistics ==
=== Club ===
As of match played 7 September 2026

Appearances and goals by club, season and competition
Club	Season	League			National cup (Note: Includes King Cup, Copa del Rey)		League cup (Note: Include Crown Prince Cup)		Continental (Note: Includes AFC Champions League, AFC Cup)		Other		Total	
Club	Season	Division	Apps	Goals	Apps	Goals	Apps	Goals	Apps	Goals	Apps	Goals	Apps	Goals
Al-Ettifaq	2009–10	Pro League	21	1	—		1	0	—		—		22	1
Al-Ettifaq	2010–11	Pro League	23	4	1	0	3	0	—		—		27	4
Al-Ettifaq	2011–12	Pro League	18	1	2	0	4	2	12 (Note: One appearance in AFC Champions League, eleven appearances and two goals in AFC Cup)	2	—		36	5
Al-Ettifaq	2012–13	Pro League	25	1	2	0	1	0	5 (Note: Appearances in AFC Champions League)	2	—		33	3
Al-Ettifaq	Total		87	7	5	0	9	2	17	4	0	0	118	13
Al-Nassr	2013–14	Pro League	25	5	1	1	4	1	—		—		30	7
Al-Nassr	2014–15	Pro League	25	1	5	0	3	3	6	0	1 (Note: Appearance in Saudi Super Cup)	0	40	4
Al-Nassr	2015–16	Pro League	25	1	5	1	3	1	6	1	1	0	40	4
Al-Nassr	2016–17	Pro League	23	2	2	0	3	0	—		—		28	2
Al-Nassr	2017–18	Pro League	16	4	1	0	—		—		3 (Note: Appearances in Arab Club Champions Cup)	1	20	5
Al-Nassr	2018–19	Pro League	24	3	2	0	—		6	2	4	3	36	8
Al-Nassr	2019–20	Pro League	16	3	2	1	—		2	0	1	0	21	4
Al-Nassr	2020–21	Pro League	3	0	1	0	—		0	0	0	0	4	0
Al-Nassr	Total		157	19	19	3	13	5	20	3	10	4	219	34
CD Leganés (loan)	2017–18	La Liga	0	0	0	0	—		—		—		0	0
Al-Raed	2021–22	Pro League	19	1	1	0	—		—		—		20	1
Al-Raed	2022–23	Pro League	17	0	1	0	—		—		—		18	0
Al-Raed	Total		36	1	2	0	0	0	0	0	0	0	38	1
Al-Riyadh	2023–24	Pro League	23	0	0	0	—		—		—		23	0
Al-Riyadh	2024–25	Pro League	28	1	1	0	—		—		—		29	1
Al-Riyadh	2025–26	Pro League	14	0	1	1	—		—		—		16	1
Al-Riyadh	Total		65	1	2	1	—		—		—		67	2
Career total			345	28	28	4	22	7	37	7	10	4	442	50

=== International ===
As of match played 8 December 2019

Appearances and goals by national team and year
National team	Year	Apps	Goals
Saudi Arabia	2009	1	0
Saudi Arabia	2010	6	0
Saudi Arabia	2011	3	0
Saudi Arabia	2012	0	0
Saudi Arabia	2013	5	0
Saudi Arabia	2014	9	0
Saudi Arabia	2015	11	3
Saudi Arabia	2016	8	1
Saudi Arabia	2017	11	1
Saudi Arabia	2018	13	3
Saudi Arabia	2019	8	0
Total		75	8

Scores and results list Saudi Arabia's goal tally first, score column indicates score after each Al-Shehri goal.

List of international goals scored by Yahya Al-Shehri
No.	Date	Venue	Opponent	Score	Result	Competition
1	11 June 2015	Prince Mohamed bin Fahd Stadium, Dammam, Saudi Arabia	Palestine	1–0	3–2	2018 FIFA World Cup qualification
2	3 September 2015	King Abdullah Sports City, Jeddah, Saudi Arabia	Timor-Leste	1–0	7–0	2018 FIFA World Cup qualification
3	17 November 2015	National Stadium, Dili, East Timor	Timor-Leste	3–0	10–0	2018 FIFA World Cup qualification
4	11 October 2016	King Abdullah Sports City, Jeddah, Saudi Arabia	United Arab Emirates	3–0	3–0	2018 FIFA World Cup qualification
5	28 March 2017	King Abdullah Sports City, Jeddah, Saudi Arabia	Iraq	1–0	1–0	2018 FIFA World Cup qualification
6	9 May 2018	Estadio Ramón de Carranza, Cádiz, Spain	Algeria	2–0	2–0	Friendly
7	28 May 2018	kybunpark, St. Gallen, Switzerland	Italy	1–2	1–2	Friendly
8	10 September 2018	Prince Faisal bin Fahd Stadium, Riyadh, Saudi Arabia	Bolivia	1–0	2–2	Friendly

== Honours ==
Al-Nassr

- Saudi Pro League: 2013–14, 2014–15, 2018–19
- Crown Prince's Cup: 2013–14
- Saudi Super Cup: 2019, 2020
