= Awadh Khamis =

Saudi Arabian footballer (born 1988)

Personal information
- Full name: Awadh Khamis Bakhit Al Faraj Al-Suqoor
- Date of birth: July 15, 1988 (age 38)
- Place of birth: Najran, Saudi Arabia
- Height: 1.79 m (5 ft 10 in)
- Positions: Defensive midfielder; full-back

Senior career*
Years	Team	Apps	(Gls)
2010–2012	Najran	34	(6)
2012–2020	Al-Nassr	116	(1)
2020–2023	Al-Raed	39	(1)
2023–2025	Al-Okhdood	55	(0)

International career^{‡}
2014	Saudi Arabia	1	(0)
- * Club domestic league appearances and goals as of 27 May 2024 ‡ National team caps and goals as of 21:22, 26 December 2016 (UTC)

Awadh Khamis Al-Faraj (Arabic: عوض خميس آل فرج; born July 15, 1988) is a Saudi Arabian footballer who currently plays as a full-back or a midfielder.

== Club career ==
Awadh Khamis started his career at Najran and is a product of Najran's youth system. He made his debut for Najran on 25 February 2011 in the league match against Al-Ettifaq replacing Turky Al-Thagafi in the 76th minute. He scored his first goal for the club on 20 March 2011 in the league match against Al-Shabab. He made 37 appearances and scored 6 goals for the club throughout all competitions.

On 30 April 2012, Awadh Khamis signed a five-year contract with Al-Nassr. On 2 August 2012, Khamis made his debut for Al-Nassr against Al-Fateh in the Pro League, replacing Damián Manso. In his first year with the club, he participated in six games across all competitions. In his second season at the club, Khamis established himself as a starter and played a vital role in helping the club win their first league title since 1995. On 1 February 2014, Khamis started the 2014 Crown Prince Cup final and helped the club win their first title since 1974. In the 2014–15 season, Khamis made 19 appearances in the league as he helped the club win a second consecutive league title.

On 10 February 2017, Al-Hilal announced that Awadh Khamis would sign for the club on a free transfer. However, 11 days later, Al-Nassr announced that they had renewed Khamis' contract for another three years. On 24 October 2017, it was announced that the situation had been resolved and Al-Nassr had to pay Al-Hilal SAR6 million.

Following the expiry of his contract, Awadh Khamis joined Al-Raed on a two-year contract on 30 August 2020.

On 27 June 2023, Awadh Khamis joined Al-Okhdood on a free transfer. On 17 July 2024, Khamis renewed his contract with Al-Okhdood.

== Career statistics ==
=== Club ===
As of 30 May 2024.

Appearances and goals by club, season and competition
Club	Season	League		King Cup		Crown Prince Cup (Note: Discontinued in September 19, 2017)		Continental		Other		Total	
Club	Season	Apps	Goals	Apps	Goals	Apps	Goals	Apps	Goals	Apps	Goals	Apps	Goals
Najran	2010–11	9	1	—		1	0	—		—		10	1
Najran	2011–12	25	5	—		2	0	—		—		27	5
Najran	Total	34	6	0	0	3	0	0	0	0	0	37	6
Al-Nassr	2012–13	4	0	2	0	0	0	—		—		6	0
Al-Nassr	2013–14	16	0	1	0	4	0	—		—		21	0
Al-Nassr	2014–15	19	0	3	0	2	0	5	0	1 (Note: Appearances in Saudi Super Cup)	0	30	0
Al-Nassr	2015–16	13	0	5	0	2	0	4	0	1	0	25	0
Al-Nassr	2016–17	17	0	3	0	4	0	—		—		24	0
Al-Nassr	2017–18	14	0	2	0	—		—		—		16	0
Al-Nassr	2018–19	17	1	4	0	—		7	0	4 (Note: Appearances in Arab Club Champions Cup)	0	32	1
Al-Nassr	2019–20	16	0	3	1	—		6	0	1	0	26	1
Al-Nassr	Total	116	1	23	1	12	0	22	0	7	0	180	2
Al-Raed	2020–21	4	1	0	0	—		—		—		4	1
Al-Raed	2021–22	8	0	0	0	—		—		—		8	0
Al-Raed	2022–23	27	0	0	0	—		—		—		27	0
Al-Raed	Total	39	1	0	0	0	0	0	0	0	0	39	1
Al-Okhdood	2023–24	25	0	1	0	—		—		—		26	0
Career total		214	8	24	1	15	0	22	0	7	0	282	9

== Honours ==
=== Clubs ===
Al-Nassr

- Saudi Professional League: 2013–14, 2014–15, 2018–19
- Saudi Crown Prince Cup: 2013–14
- Saudi Super Cup: 2019
