= Khalil Khamis (footballer, born 1992) =

Emirati footballer

Personal information
- Full name: Khalil Khamis Salem
- Date of birth: 15 July 1992 (age 34)
- Place of birth: Fujairah, United Arab Emirates
- Height: 1.72 m (5 ft 8 in)
- Position: Midfielder

Youth career
- Fujairah

Senior career*
Years	Team	Apps	(Gls)
2014–2016	Fujairah	44	(6)
2016–2019	Al-Wasl	47	(2)
2019–2021	Fujairah	36	(0)
2021–2022	Al-Sharjah	12	(0)
2022–2024	Khor Fakkan	34	(0)
- * Club domestic league appearances and goals as of 03:22, 21 November 2020 (UTC)

Khalil Khamis Salem (Arabic: خليل خميس; born 15 July 1992) is an Emirati professional footballer who plays as a midfielder.
