= Bruno Uvini =

Brazilian footballer (born 1991)

Personal information
- Full name: Bruno Uvini Bortolança
- Date of birth: 3 June 1991 (age 35)
- Place of birth: Capivari, São Paulo, Brazil
- Height: 1.87 m (6 ft 2 in)
- Position: Centre back

Youth career
- 2005–2007: PAEC
- 2007–2010: São Paulo

Senior career*
Years	Team	Apps	(Gls)
2010–2012	São Paulo	8	(0)
2012	→ Tottenham Hotspur (loan)	0	(0)
2012–2016	Napoli	1	(0)
2013	→ Siena (loan)	0	(0)
2014	→ Santos (loan)	11	(2)
2015–2016	→ FC Twente (loan)	33	(2)
2016–2019	Al-Nassr	69	(4)
2019–2020	Al-Wakrah	12	(1)
2020	Al-Ittihad	17	(1)
2021–2022	FC Tokyo	2	(0)
2023–2024	Grêmio	26	(2)
2024–2025	Vitória	6	(0)

International career^{‡}
2010	Brazil U19	3	(2)
2011	Brazil U20	16	(1)
2012	Brazil U23	1	(0)
2012	Brazil	3	(0)
Medal record
Representing Brazil
Men's Football
Silver medal – second place	2012 London	Team competition
- * Club domestic league appearances and goals as of 26 November 2023 ‡ National team caps and goals as of 13 September 2013

Bruno Uvini Bortolança (born 3 June 1991) is a Brazilian footballer who plays as a centre back for Vitória.

== Club career ==
=== Early career ===
Uvini was born in Capivari, Brazil. He played in the Pinta de Craque football academy owned by his father, Bruno Uvini, known by Tuca, a former central defender at Ponte Preta, before moving to PAEC's youth system.

=== São Paulo ===
Uvini joined São Paulo FC's youth academy in 2007, aged 16. He was promoted to the club's senior side in 2010, and made his professional debut on 29 September 2010, coming on as a late substitute in a 2–4 loss at Grêmio, and also appeared in one further more game (again from the bench) in the season.

In 2011, Uvini appeared in six matches with Tricolor, being handed his first start on 26 June, in a 0–5 loss at Corinthians.

==== Tottenham (loan) ====
On 14 February 2012, Tottenham Hotspur agreed to sign Bruno Uvini on loan until the end of the 2011–12 season, with an option to make the move permanent for €3.7 million. Uvini failed to live up to expectations at Tottenham, and the club opted not to sign him on a permanent basis. He left without making a first-team appearance for the London-based club.

=== Napoli ===
On 29 August 2012, it was reported that Uvini was having a medical with Serie A club Napoli, signing a five-year deal a day later. On 6 December he made his debut for the club, starting in a 1–3 home loss against PSV Eindhoven in that season's UEFA Europa League.

Uvini made his Serie A debut on 2 November 2013, replacing injured Giandomenico Mesto in 2–1 home success over Catania.

==== Siena (loan) ====
On 31 January 2013, Uvini was loaned to fellow top-divisioner Siena until 30 June. He did not appear in any official match for Siena, and returned to Napoli at the end of 2012–13 season.

==== Santos (loan) ====
On 30 March 2014 Uvini returned to Brazil, joining Santos on loan until the end of the year. He made his debut on 9 May, starting and playing 76 minutes in a 2–1 Copa do Brasil win at Princesa do Solimões.

On 18 July, Uvini scored his first professional goal, netting the first of a 2–0 home win against Palmeiras.

==== Twente (loan) ====
On 13 July 2015, Uvini signed a season long loan for Dutch side FC Twente.

=== Al Nassr ===
On 17 August 2016, Uvini agreed to go to Al Nassr FC of Saudi Professional League. He played three seasons and 77 games for the club.

=== Al-Wakrah ===
In July 2019, Uvini moved to Qatar and signed for Al-Wakrah SC, which promoted to Stars League.

=== Al-Ittihad ===
In the middle of the 2019–2020 season, Univi returned to Saudi Arabia to join Al-Ittihad Club. He left the club just after the beginning of the 2020–2021 season of the Saudi Professional League.

=== FC Tokyo ===
On 29 January 2021, Univi agreed to join J1 League club FC Tokyo. In the 2021 season, he played 8 games for the club, and scored 1 goal at J.League Cup game against Tokushima Vortis. Though his contract with Tokyo continued in the 2022 season, the club did not enrol him as a member of the squad. On 29 August, Tokyo announced the cancellation of the contract with Uvini.

== International career ==
Uvini captained the Brazil U20 team in the 2011 South American Youth Championships. On 6 February 2011, Uvini suffered a fractured fibula in a match against Argentina, which required surgery and kept him out of action for more than a month. Later in 2011, he captained the Brazilian side that won the U20 World Cup. In May 2012 he was called for main squad to friendly matches, and in July 2012 Uvini was called to play 2012 Olympic Games.

== Personal life ==
Bruno Uvini is a practising Roman Catholic.

== Career statistics ==
=== Club ===
As of 26 November 2023

Club	Season	League			State League		Cup		League Cup		Continental		Other		Total	
Club	Season	Division	Apps	Goals	Apps	Goals	Apps	Goals	Apps	Goals	Apps	Goals	Apps	Goals	Apps	Goals
São Paulo	2010	Série A	2	0	0	0	0	0	—		0	0	—		2	0
São Paulo	2011	Série A	6	0	0	0	0	0	—		0	0	—		6	0
São Paulo	2012	Série A	0	0	0	0	1	0	—		0	0	—		1	0
São Paulo	Total		8	0	0	0	1	0	0	0	0	0	0	0	9	0
Napoli	2012–13	Serie A	0	0	—		0	0	—		1	0	—		1	0
Napoli	2013–14	Serie A	1	0	—		0	0	—		0	0	—		1	0
Napoli	Total		1	0	0	0	0	0	0	0	1	0	0	0	2	0
Siena (loan)	2012–13	Serie A	0	0	—		0	0	—		—		—		0	0
Santos (loan)	2014	Série A	11	2	—		3	0	—		0	0	—		14	2
Twente (loan)	2015–16	Eredivisie	33	2	—		1	0	—		—		—		34	2
Al Nassr	2016–17	Saudi Pro League	19	0	—		3	1	—		—		—		22	1
Al Nassr	2017–18	Saudi Pro League	25	2	—		2	0	—		—		1	0	28	2
Al Nassr	2018–19	Saudi Pro League	25	2	—		2	0	—		0	0	—		27	2
Al Nassr	Total		69	4	0	0	7	1	0	0	0	0	1	0	77	5
Al-Wakrah	2019–20	Qatar Stars League	12	1	—		—		—		—		—		12	1
Al-Ittihad	2019–20	Saudi Pro League	16	1	—		—		—		—		—		16	1
Al-Ittihad	2020–21	Saudi Pro League	1	0	—		—		—		—		—		1	0
Al-Ittihad	Total		17	1	0	0	0	0	0	0	0	0	0	0	17	1
FC Tokyo	2021	J1 League	2	0	—		1	0	5	1	—		—		8	1
Grêmio	2023	Série A	20	1	6	1	6	0	—		—		—		32	2
Career total			173	11	6	1	17	1	5	1	1	0	1	0	203	14

=== International ===
As of 9 June 2012

National team	Year	Apps	Goals
Brazil	2012	3	0
Total		3	0

== Honours ==
=== Youth ===
São Paulo

- Copa São Paulo de Futebol Júnior: 2010

=== Senior ===
Al-Nassr

- Saudi Pro League: 2018–19

Grêmio

- Campeonato Gaúcho: 2023, 2024
- Recopa Gaúcha: 2023

Brazil

- South American Youth Championship: 2011
- FIFA U-20 World Cup: 2011
- Olympic Silver Medal: 2012
