= Abdulaziz Al-Jebreen =

Saudi Arabian footballer

Personal information
- Full name: Abdulaziz Jebreen Al-Jebreen
- Date of birth: 19 April 1990 (age 36)
- Place of birth: Riyadh, Saudi Arabia
- Height: 1.78 m (5 ft 10 in)
- Position: Midfielder

Team information
- Current team: Al-Raed
- Number: 16

Youth career
- Al-Shabab
- Al-Raed

Senior career*
Years	Team	Apps	(Gls)
2011–2014	Al-Raed	42	(3)
2014–2020	Al-Nassr	69	(2)
2020–2022	Al-Ittihad	15	(0)
2022	Al-Batin	0	(0)
2022–	Al-Raed	7	(0)

International career^{‡}
2014–	Saudi Arabia	4	(0)
- * Club domestic league appearances and goals as of 6 April 2024 ‡ National team caps and goals as of 23:22, 6 September 2016 (UTC)

Abdulaziz Al-Jebreen (Arabic: عبدالعزيز الجبرين; born 19 April 1990 in Riyadh) is a Saudi Arabian professional footballer who plays as a midfielder for Al-Raed.

== Career ==
Al-Jebreen started his career at the youth teams of Al-Shabab before moving to Al-Raed in 2010. On 2 August 2012, Al-Jebreen made his league debut for Al-Raed in the 2–2 draw against Al-Ittihad. On 16 July 2013, Al-Jebreen signed his first professional contract with Al-Raed. On 7 May 2014, Al-Jebreen joined Al-Nassr on a five-year contract for a reported fee of SAR12 million. On 10 April 2018, Al-Jebreen renewed his contract with Al-Nassr. On 21 October 2020, Al-Jebreen joined Al-Ittihad on a free transfer. On 24 July 2022, Al-Jebreen was released by Al-Ittihad after both sides agreed to end it mutually. On the same day, Al-Jebreen joined Al-Batin on a one-year deal. After Al-Batin failed to register him in their squad, Al-Jebreen and the club agreed to end their contract. On 31 August 2022, Al-Jebreen joined former club Al-Raed.

== Honours ==
Al-Nassr

- Saudi Professional League: 2014–15, 2018–19
- Saudi Super Cup: 2019
