= Hassan Al-Raheb =

Saudi Arabian footballer

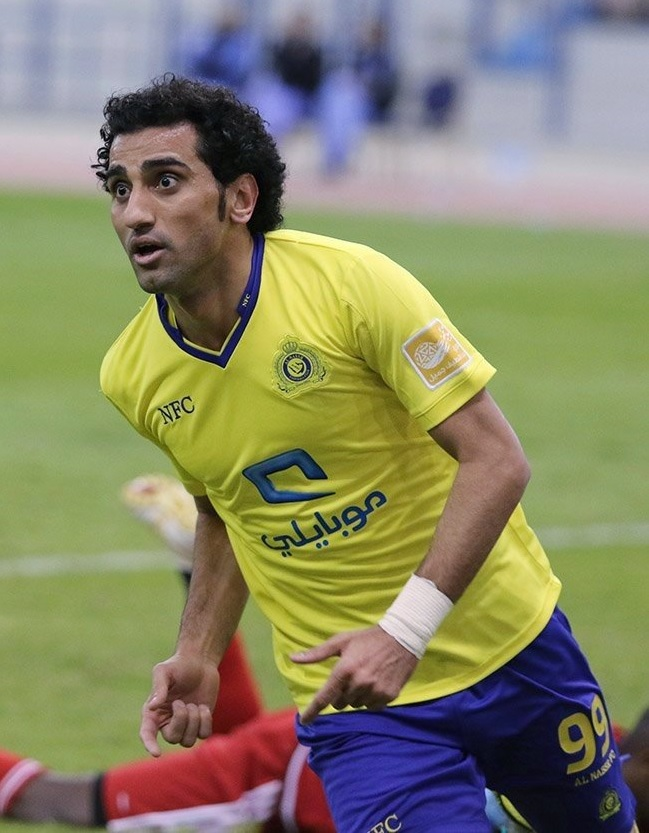

Personal information
- Full name: Hassan Ali Al-Raheb
- Date of birth: April 7, 1983 (age 43)
- Place of birth: Qatif, Saudi Arabia
- Height: 1.68 m (5 ft 6 in)
- Position: Second striker

Youth career
- Al-Taraji

Senior career*
Years	Team	Apps	(Gls)
2002–2008	Al-Khaleej	100	(43)
2008–2012	Al-Ahli	60	(14)
2012–2013	Najran	12	(2)
2013–2018	Al-Nassr	89	(26)
2018–2020	Al-Shabab	11	(0)

International career^{‡}
2008–2018	Saudi Arabia	8	(0)
- * Club domestic league appearances and goals as of 20 January 2018 ‡ National team caps and goals as of 26 May 2009

Hassan Ali Al-Raheb (Arabic: حسن علي الراهب) (born 7 April 1983) is a former Saudi football player who played as a second striker.

== Club career ==
In Summer 2008, Al-Raheb moved to Al-Ahli. In 2012, Al-Raheb moved to Najran club. He later joined Al-Nassr in the Winter of 2013. In 2018, he joined Al-Shabab. On 12 October 2020, Al-Raheb announced his retirement.

== International career ==
Al-Raheb played for Saudi Arabia from 2008 until 2009. Later on, he was called up for a friendly match against Iraq in 2018.

== Honours ==
Al-Khaleej

- Saudi First Division League: 2005–06

Al-Ahli

- Gulf Club Champions Cup: 2008
- King's Cup: 2011, 2012

Al-Nassr

- Crown Prince's Cup: 2013–14
- Saudi Pro League: 2013–14, 2014–15
