= Shaye Sharahili =

Saudi Arabian footballer (born 1990)

Personal information
- Full name: Shaye Ali Sharahili
- Date of birth: May 30, 1990 (age 36)
- Place of birth: Riyadh, Saudi Arabia
- Height: 1.76 m (5 ft 9 1/2 in)
- Position: Defensive midfielder

Youth career
- 2005–2009: Al-Nassr

Senior career*
Years	Team	Apps	(Gls)
2009–2018	Al-Nassr	120	(5)
2018–2019	Al-Qadsiah	18	(0)
2020–2022	Al-Faisaly	4	(0)

International career^{‡}
2013–2015	Saudi Arabia	4	(0)
- * Club domestic league appearances and goals as of 4 February 2018 ‡ National team caps and goals as of 23:37, 26 December 2016 (UTC)

Shaye Sharahili (Arabic: شايع شراحيلي; born 30 May 1990) is a Saudi Arabian football plays as a defensive midfielder.

== Honours ==
=== Clubs ===
Al-Nassr

- Saudi Professional League: 2013–14, 2014–15
- Crown Prince Cup: 2013–14

Al-Faisaly

- King Cup: 2020–21
