= 2012–13 Al-Nassr FC season =

The 2012–13 season was Al-Nassr's 37th consecutive season in the top flight of Saudi football and 57th year in existence as a football club

2012-13 season
Season 2012–13
Chairman : (Saudi Arabia) Prince Faisal Bin Turki Bin Nasser
Manager : [1 – 5] (Colombia) Francisco Maturana; 6th match (Uruguay) Alejandro Richino Dutra [7 – 28] (Uruguay) José Daniel Carreño
Competitions
Saudi Professional League	4th
King Cup	Runners-up
Crown Prince Cup	Runners-up
UAFA Cup	Quarter-finals
AlWehda International Championship 2012	Winner
Top goalscorer
Saudi Professional League	Ayoví (8); M. Alsahlawi (8)
King Cup	
Crown Prince Cup	M. Alsahlawi (3)
Arab Cup of Club 2012–2013	M. Alsahlawi (2)
All	M. Alsahlawi (13)
$\leftarrow$ Previous Season 2011–2012	Next Season $\rightarrow$ 2013–2014

== Players ==
All ages are calculated from 1 August 2012. Saudi competitions and AFC competitions allow each club to register four foreign players as long as one of them belongs to a nation under the AFC.

Al Nassr Season 2012–2013 Players

Goalkeepers
P	No.	Nat.	Name	Age	Other
GK	1	(Saudi Arabia)	K. Radhy	30
GK	22	(Saudi Arabia)	Al-Enezi	21
GK	28	(Saudi Arabia)	Al-Deayea	23
GK	31	(Saudi Arabia)	Al-Shammeri	20
GK	33	(Saudi Arabia)	M.Assiri	24

Defenders
P	No.	Nat.	Name	Age	Other
CB	2	(Bahrain)	M. Husain	32	AFC
CB	4	(Saudi Arabia)	O. Hawsawi	27
CB	5	(Uzbekistan)	Mullajanov	26	AFC
RB	12	(Saudi Arabia)	K. Al-Ghamdi	24
CB	13	(Saudi Arabia)	M. Eid	25
CB	17	(Saudi Arabia)	Y.Khamees	22
CB	18	(Saudi Arabia)	Al-Dossari	25
LB	20	(Saudi Arabia)	Al-Zubaidi
LB	24	(Saudi Arabia)	H. Sulaimani (C)	35
RB	26	(Saudi Arabia)	Sharahili	23
CB	29	(Saudi Arabia)	Al Zahri	21
RB	32	(Saudi Arabia)	T. Assiri	23
CB	40	(Saudi Arabia)	Al-Yami	21

Midfielders
P	No.	Nat.	Name	Age	Other
DM	6	(Saudi Arabia)	A. Abbas	26
LM	7	(Saudi Arabia)	A. Alqahtani	29
DM	8	(Egypt)	H. Abd Rabo	27	Not AFC
DM	14	(Saudi Arabia)	I. Ghaleb	21
MF	15	(Saudi Arabia)	Abdoh Otaif	28
MF	–	(Saudi Arabia)	Al-Rashidi	21
AM	16	(Brazil)	Bastos	27	Not AFC
AM	25	(Saudi Arabia)	K. Alzylaeei	25
MF	27	(Saudi Arabia)	A.Khamis	24
RM	30	(Saudi Arabia)	Al-Dhiyabi	20
DM	34	(Saudi Arabia)	A.Assiri	22
DM	66	(Saudi Arabia)	K. Aziz	31
LM	–	(Saudi Arabia)	Al-Nassar	21

Forwards
P	No.	Nat.	Name	Age	Other
CF	10	(Saudi Arabia)	M. Alsahlawi	25
CF	11	(Ecuador)	Ayoví	24	Not AFC
SS	19	(Saudi Arabia)	Al-Otaibi	20
SS	23	(Saudi Arabia)	S.Hamood	22
CF	35	(Saudi Arabia)	Al-Jizani
CF	88	(Saudi Arabia)	Al-Saran	28
CF	99	(Saudi Arabia)	H. Alraheb	29

== Transfers ==
=== Summer Transfers ===
==== In ====
P	No.	Nat.	Name	Age	From	Deal Type	Duration	Price	Other	Source
MF	27	(Saudi Arabia)	Awadh Khamis	24	(Saudi Arabia) Najran	Transfer	5 Years	8 Million S.R		
LB	24	(Saudi Arabia)	H. Sulaimani	35	(Saudi Arabia) Al Nassr	Renew Contract	2 Years			
CF	29	(Saudi Arabia)	R. Belal	23	(Saudi Arabia) Al Qadisiyah	Return Loan	–	–		
MF	–	(Saudi Arabia)	Ahmed Al-Hadrami		(Saudi Arabia) Al Raed	Return Loan	–	–		
CF	35	(Saudi Arabia)	Ahmed Al-Jizani		(Saudi Arabia) Al Qadisiyah	Return Loan	–	–		
CF	–	(Saudi Arabia)	M. Alshahrani		(Saudi Arabia) Al Fateh	Return Loan	–	–		
LB	–	(Saudi Arabia)	Abdulakreem Al-Khaibari		(Saudi Arabia) Al Qadisiyah	Return Loan	–	–		
CF	11	(Ecuador)	Ayoví	24	(Mexico) Pachuca	Loan	1 Year	8 Million S.R	Not AFC	
MF	21	(Argentina)	Manso	33	(Ecuador) LDU Quito	Transfer	1 Year	4 Million S.R	Not AFC	
CB	5	(Uzbekistan)	Mullajanov	26	(Qatar) Al Ahli	Transfer	–	2.5 Million S.R	AFC	
DM	8	(Egypt)	H. Abd Rabo	27	(Saudi Arabia) Al Ittihad	Loan	1 Year	10 Million S.R	Not AFC	
MF	15	(Saudi Arabia)	Abdoh Otaif	28	(Saudi Arabia) Al Ittihad	Transfer	2 Years	8 Million S.R		
MF	30	(Saudi Arabia)	Abdulaziz Al-Dhiyabi	20	Youth team	Professional contract	–			
MF	–	(Saudi Arabia)	Rayan Al-Boqami		Youth team	Professional contract	–			
CB	17	(Saudi Arabia)	Yousef Khamees	22	Youth team	Professional contract	–			
CB	–	(Saudi Arabia)	Fahad Al-Swilem		Youth team	Professional contract	–			
GK	–	(Saudi Arabia)	Marwan Madou		Youth team	Professional contract	–			
GK	–	(Saudi Arabia)	Bader Al-Deayea	23	(Saudi Arabia) Al Hilal	Transfer	1 Year	Million S.R		
CB	18	(Saudi Arabia)	Jamaan Al-Dossari	25	(Saudi Arabia) Al Riyadh	Transfer	5 Years	1.5 Million S.R		

==== Out ====
P	No.	Nat.	Name	Age	To	Deal Type	Duration	Price	Other	Source
MF	50	(Brazil)	Reche			Contract Termination	–		Not AFC	
MF	77	(South Korea)	Kim Byung-Suk			Contract Termination	–		AFC	
CF	99	(Brazil)	Wagner			Contract Termination	–		Not AFC	
CF	83	(Algeria)	Bouguèche			Contract Termination	–		Not AFC	
CF	19	(Saudi Arabia)	M. Mouath	30	(Saudi Arabia) Al Ahli	Return Loan	–			
LB	30	(Saudi Arabia)	Adnan Fallatah	28	(Saudi Arabia) Al Fateh	Contract Termination	–			
DM	15	(Saudi Arabia)	Abdulaziz Fallatah	26	(Saudi Arabia) Al Taawon	Contract Termination	–			
CF	29	(Saudi Arabia)	R. Belal	23	(Saudi Arabia) Al Raed	Contract Termination	–			
GK	21	(Saudi Arabia)	Kameel Al-Wabari	26		Contract Termination	–			
LB	–	(Saudi Arabia)	Abdulakreem Al-Khaibari			Contract Termination	–			
MF	–	(Saudi Arabia)	Ahmed Al-Hadrami		(Saudi Arabia) Al Raed	Contract Termination	–			
DM	–	(Saudi Arabia)	Abdulaziz Hawsawi		(Saudi Arabia) Al Fateh	Transfer	–			
DM	32	(Saudi Arabia)	Abdulaziz Al-Aazmi	21	(Saudi Arabia) Al Hilal	Transfer	–			
CF	–	(Saudi Arabia)	M. Alshahrani		(Saudi Arabia) Hajer	–	–			

=== Winter Transfers ===
==== In ====
P	No.	Nat.	Name	Age	From	Deal Type	Duration	Price	Other	Source
LB	20	(Saudi Arabia)	Ibrahim Al-Zubaidi		(Saudi Arabia) Al Wahda	Transfer	3 Years	8 Millions S.R		
AM	16	(Brazil)	Bastos	27	(Romania) CFR Cluj	Transfer	2.5 Years	€2.7 millions	Not AFC	
CB	2	(Bahrain)	M. Husain	32	(Qatar) Umm Salal	Transfer	6 Months		AFC	
CF	99	(Saudi Arabia)	H. Alraheb	29	(Saudi Arabia) Najran	Transfer	1.5 Years	3 Millions S.R		

==== Out ====
P	No.	Nat.	Name	Age	To	Deal Type	Duration	Price	Other	Source
MF	21	(Argentina)	Manso	33		Contract Termination	–	–	Not AFC	
CB	–	(Saudi Arabia)	Osama Aashor	22	(Saudi Arabia) Al Fateh	Transfer	2.5 years	–		
LB	3	(Saudi Arabia)	A. Bernaoy	28	(Saudi Arabia) Al Fateh	Loan	1.5 years	–		

== Pre-season Preparations ==
Training for the new season started on 18 June 2012. The team left Saudi Arabia for training sessions in Barcelona, Spain on 23 June 2012 and returned to Saudi Arabia on 22 July 2012.

=== AlWehda International Championship 2012 ===
==== Matches ====
Win Draw Loss Postponed

10 August 2012 Round 1	Al Wahda (United Arab Emirates)	1–4	(Saudi Arabia) Al Nassr	Al Nahyan Stadium, Abu Dhabi, UAE
20:30 AST	Papa Waigo 19'		Al Sahlawi 33'; Ayoví 60'; Ayoví 72'; A. Al-Qahtani 80'

13 August 2012 Round 2	Al Nahda (Oman)	1–2	(Saudi Arabia) Al Nassr	Al Nahyan Stadium, Abu Dhabi, UAE
20:30 AST	Mansour Al Nueemi (43), (P.K) 43'		Saud Hamood 33'; Al Sahlawi 80'

16 August 2012 Round 3	Al Nassr (Saudi Arabia)	1–1	(Bahrain) Al Riffa	Al Nahyan Stadium, Abu Dhabi, UAE
20:30 AST	K. Al Ghamdi (red card) 50'; Awdh Khamees 52'		Abdulla Abdo 62'

Pos	Team	Pld	W	D	L	GF	GA	GD	Pts
1	(Saudi Arabia) Al Nassr	3	2	1	0	7	3	+4	7
2	(United Arab Emirates) Al Wahda	3	2	0	1	5	6	−1	6
3	(Bahrain) Al Riffa	3	0	2	1	5	6	−1	2
4	(Oman) Al Nahda	3	0	1	2	3	5	−2	1

== First team competitions ==
=== First Team Goal Sccorer ===
Name	League	CPC	KCC	Arab Cup	Total
M. Alsahlawi	8	3	0	2	13
Ayoví	8	0	0	1	9
H. Abd Rabo	2	2	0	1	5
Bastos	3	1	0	1	5
A. Alqahtani	2	0	0	1	3
K. Alzylaeei	2	1	0	0	3
S. Hamood	1	0	0	1	2
Abdoh Otaif	1	1	0	0	2
H. Sulaimani	1	0	0	0	1
M. Eid	1	0	0	0	1
A. Abbas	1	0	0	0	1
K. Alghamdi	0	0	0	1	1
O. Hawsawi	1	0	0	0	1
H. Alraheb	0	1	0	0	1

=== 2012–13 Saudi Professional League ===
==== Results summary ====
Overall								Home						Away					
Pld	W	D	L	GF	GA	GD	Pts	W	D	L	GF	GA	GD	W	D	L	GF	GA	GD
19	11	4	4	32	18	+14	37	6	2	2	18	9	+9	5	2	2	14	9	+5

==== Matches ====
Win Draw Loss Postponed

2 August 2012 Round 1	Al Fateh	1–1	Al Nassr	Prince Abdullah bin Jalawi Stadium, Al-Hasa
22:00 AST	Élton (yellow card) 22'; Rabeaa Sefiani 42'; Fayez Alaliani (yellow card) 88'	(Report)	S. Hamood 53'; Abdoh Bernaoy (yellow card) 93'	Attendance: 3925; Referee: Fahad Aloraini; Assistant referees: - 1st Assistant: Majed Alnasser; 2nd Assistant: Mohammed Alabkari; Fourth official: Meree Alawagi

6 August 2012 Round 2	Al Nassr	4–0	Al Raed	King Fahd International Stadium, Riyadh
22:15 AST	M. Alsahlawi 5'; H. Sulaimani 17'; Issam Raki (43), Own Goal 43'; M. Alsahlawi 57' (pen.)	(Report)	Ahmed Al-Khair (yellow card) 38'; Mohammed Alkhojli (yellow card) 56'; Abdul Sallam Amur (yellow card) 69'	Attendance: 3633; Referee: Khalil Al-Ghamdi; Assistant referees: - 1st Assistant: Nassir Al-Mudhaffr; 2nd Assistant: Hisham Al-Refai; Fourth official: Abdulaziz Al-Funaitel

23 August 2012 Round 3	Al Nassr	0–1	Al Ittihad	King Fahd International Stadium, Riyadh
20:40 AST	H. Abd Rabo (yellow card) 45'; S. Hamood (yellow card) 95'	(Report)	Anas Sharbini (yellow card) 57'; Diego de Souza 59'; Mohammed Abousaban (yellow card) 83'; Ibrahim Hazzazi (yellow card) 93'	Attendance: 9660; Referee: Meree Al-Awagi; Assistant referees: - 1st Assistant: Bader Al-Shamrani; 2nd Assistant: Abdulaziz Al-Kathiri; Fourth official: Bader Al-Anazi

27 August 2012 Round 4	Al Taawon	1–2	Al Nassr	King Abdullah Sport City Stadium, Buraidah
20:40 AST	Abdulaziz Al-Harbi (yellow card) 39'; Ahmed Mefleh 48'; Bouguèche (yellow card) 50'; Yassen Hamza (yellow card) 66'; Fahad Al-Thunayyan (yellow card) 73'; Faisal Al-Jahdali (yellow card) 93'	(Report)	H. Abd Rabo 45+1'; H. Sulaimani (yellow card) 63'; K. Al Ghamdi (yellow card) 68'; M. Eid 85'	Attendance: 5340; Referee: Sami Al-Nemri; Assistant referees: - 1st Assistant: Fahad Al-Amri; 2nd Assistant: Nassir Al-Mudhaffr; Fourth official: Mohammed Al-Nuhait

1 September 2012 Round 5	Al Nassr	1–3	Al Hilal	King Fahd International Stadium, Riyadh
20:35 AST	M. Alsahlawi 31'; K. Alzylaeei (yellow card) 64'; H. Sulaimani (yellow card) 66'	(Report)	I. Ghaleb 21' (o.g.); Wesley 60'; Wesley 70'; Mangane (yellow card) 89'	Attendance: 14162; Referee: Kever Saschai; Assistant referees: - 1st Assistant: Zeder Raffael; 2nd Assistant: Dettamanti Devis; Fourth official: Abdulaziz Alfunaitel

15 September 2012 Round 6	Al Nassr	1–0	Hajer	Prince Faisal bin Fahd Stadium, Riyadh
20:25 AST	A. Alqahtani 64'	(Report)	Attram (yellow card) 75'; Jehad Alzoaed (yellow card) 84'	Attendance: 1383; Referee: Abdelrahman Almalki; Assistant referees: - 1st Assistant: Yahya Almeteq; 2nd Assistant: Hisham Alrefai; Fourth official: Khaled Alteris

22 September 2012 Round 7	Al Ettifaq	Postponed	Al Nassr	Prince Mohamed bin Fahd Stadium, Dammam
19:35 AST		Al Ettifaq has an AFC Cup match

29 September 2012 Round 8	Al Nassr	3–1	Al Wahda	King Fahd International Stadium, Riyadh
20:10 AST	A. Alqahtani 44'; A. Alqahtani (yellow card) 48'; Ayoví 66'; Sh. Sharahili (yellow card) 74'; K. Alghamdi (yellow card) 74'; A. Abbas 78'	(Report)	Mohannad Aseri 69'; Sari Amro (yellow card) 72'; Maher Othman (yellow card) 81'	Attendance: 1612; Referee: Mohammed Alnuhait; Assistant referees: - 1st Assistant: Bader Alshamrani; 2nd Assistant: Waleed Alboaimi; Fourth official: Yahya Alqarni

5 October 2012 Round 9	Al Shabab	2–1	Al Nassr	Prince Faisal bin Fahd Stadium, Riyadh
20:00 AST	N. Alshamrani 05'; S. Tagliabué 13'; H. Muath (yellow card) 19' (yellow-red card) 19'; W. Abdullah (yellow card) 32'; Camacho (yellow card) 43'; O. Alghamdi (yellow card) 45'; Naif Alqadi (red card) 76'; W, Abd-Rabo (yellow card) 78'; N. Alshamrani (yellow card) 87'	(Report)	S. Hamood (yellow card) 32'; H. Sulaimani (yellow card) 54'; K. Alzylaeei (yellow card) 67'; M. Eid (penalty missed); K. Alzylaeei 88'	Attendance: 6750; Referee: Abdulrahman Alamri; Assistant referees: - 1st Assistant: Bader Alshamrani; 2nd Assistant: Mohammed Alabkari; Fourth official: Khaled Salwi

20 October 2012 Round 10	Al Nassr	1–1	Najran	Prince Faisal bin Fahd Stadium, Riyadh
19:50 AST	Ayoví 8'; Mullajanov (yellow card) 25'; I. Ghaleb (yellow card) 26'; H. Abd Rabo (yellow card) 45+2'; Ayoví (yellow card) 81'	(Report)	F. Cheklam (yellow card) 20'; J. Alhussain 39' (pen.); S. Alabdullah (yellow card) 59'; Majed Ali (yellow card) 61'; Nasser Alsaieri (yellow card) 90+4'	Attendance: 2804; Referee: Mohammed Alhoaish; Assistant referees: 1st Assistant: Nassir Almudhaffr; 2nd Assistant: Abdulaziz Alasmari; Fourth official: Meree Alawagi

2 November 2012 Round 11	Al Nassr	3–1	Al Shoalah	Prince Faisal bin Fahd Stadium, Riyadh
19:40 AST	Ayoví 56'; K. Alghamdi (yellow card) 77'; M. Alsahlawi 80'; H. Abd Rabo 88' (F.K.)	(Report)	Ahmed Alza'aq (yellow card) 45+1'; R. Aldwesan (yellow card) 58'; Khaled Naseer (yellow card) 77'; F. Almunaif 85'	Attendance: 900; Referee: Abdulaziz Alfunaitel; Assistant referees: 1st Assistant: Khaled Aldegairi; 2nd Assistant: Ziad Almansor; Fourth official: Meree Alawagi

8 November 2012 Round 12	Al Ahli	Postponed	Al Nassr	Prince Abdullah al-Faisal Stadium, Jeddah
19:40 AST		Al Ahli has an AFC Champions League match

17 November 2012 Round 7	Al Ettifaq	1–3	Al Nassr	Prince Mohamed bin Fahd Stadium, Dammam
19:35	Sultan Albargan (yellow card) 27'; Carlos (yellow card) 71'; Júnior Xuxa (yellow card) 74'; Zamil Alsulim (yellow card) 76'; Júnior Xuxa 90+3' (pen.)	(Report)	Abdoh Otaif 22'; Ayoví 34' (pen.); Mullajanov (yellow card) 64'; M. Alsahlawi 73' (pen.); Omar Hawsawi (yellow card) 90+2'	Attendance: 5186; Referee: Khalil Alghamdi; Assistant referees: 1st Assistant: Fahad Alamri; 2nd Assistant: Hisham Alrefai; Fourth official: Abdulhadi Alamri

22 November 2012 Round 13	Al Faisaly	1–2	Al Nassr	Prince Salman Bin Abdulaziz Sport City Stadium, Al Majma'ah
19:35 AST	Abdullah Dawsh (yellow card) 48'; Y. Albakhit 84'	(Report)	S. Hamood (yellow card) 08'; Ayoví 16' (pen.); Ayoví 19'; Sh. Sharahili (yellow card) 45+4'	Attendance: 2167; Referee: Fahad Almirdasi; Assistant referees: 1st Assistant: Abdullah Alshlwi; 2nd Assistant: Yahya Almeteq; Fourth official: Bader Alanazi

9 December 2012 Round 14	Al Nassr	0–0	Al Fateh	King Fahd International Stadium, Riyadh
19:35 AST	Mullajanov (red card) 2'	(Report)	Sh. Abu Hash'hash (yellow card) 52'	Attendance: 3286; Referee: Khalil Alghamdi; Assistant referees: 1st Assistant: Abdulaziz Alasmari; 2nd Assistant: Hisham Alrefai; Fourth official: Abdulaziz Alfunaitel

14 December 2012 Round 15	Al Raed	0–2	Al Nassr	King Abdullah Sport City Stadium, Buraidah
19:35 AST	Obaid Alshamrani (yellow card) 79'	(Report)	K. Alzylaeei 29'; O. Hawsawi 45+1'	Attendance: 7266; Referee: Meree Alawagi; Assistant referees: 1st Assistant: Abdullah Alshlwi; 2nd Assistant: Ziad Almansor; Fourth official: Turki Alkhudair

28 December 2012 Round 16	Al Ittihad	1–1	Al Nassr	King Abdulaziz Stadium, Mecca
19:45 AST	S. Kariri (yellow card) 13'; M. Noor 60' (pen.); M'bami (yellow card) 75'	(Report)	Sh. Sharahili (yellow card) 25'; M. Eid (yellow card) 50'; A. Alenezi (yellow card) 66'; H. Sulaimani (yellow card) 73'; M. Alsahlawi 77'	Attendance: 9015; Referee: Fahad Almirdasi; Assistant referees: 1st Assistant: Abdulaziz Alkathiri; 2nd Assistant: Fahad Alamri; Fourth official: Abdelrahman Almalki

21 January 2013 Round 12	Al Ahli	2–1	Al Nassr	King Abdulaziz Stadium, Mecca
20:00 AST	T. Aljassim 19'; Mustafa Besas 71'	(Report)	M. Eid (yellow card) 33'; Bastos 47'	Attendance: 8264; Referee: Abdulrahman Alamri; Assistant referees: 1st Assistant: Ahmed Fakihi; 2nd Assistant: Mohammed Alabkari; Fourth official: Abdelrahman Almalki

25 January 2013 Round 17	Al Nassr	3–2	Al Taawon	Prince Faisal bin Fahd Stadium, Riyadh
15:40 AST	M. Eid (yellow card) 9'; I. Ghaleb (yellow card) 37'; Ayoví 66' (pen.); Ayoví 85'; Bastos 89'; K. Alzylaeei (yellow card) 90+3'	(Report)	Mohammed Alrashed 22'; Ahmed Mefleh (yellow card) 40'; Ahmed Mefleh 61'; Sanad Sharahili (yellow card) 64'; Ahmed Alharbi (yellow card) 82'	Attendance: 3059; Referee: Sami Alnemri; Assistant referees: 1st Assistant: Majed Alnasser; 2nd Assistant: Hisham Alrefai; Fourth official: Khaled Alteris

30 January 2013 Round 18	Al Hilal	0–1	Al Nassr	King Fahd International Stadium, Riyadh
20:05 AST	Bolívar (yellow card) 7'; M. Nami (yellow card) 41'; Ozéia (yellow card) 90+2'	(Report)	M. Alsahlawi 13'; A. Alenezi (yellow card) 48'; Bastos 85'	Attendance: 18437; Referee: Thorsten Kinhöfer; Assistant referees: 1st Assistant: Markus Hacker; 2nd Assistant: Christian Fischer; Fourth official: Abdulaziz Alfunaitel

14 February 2013 Round 19	Hajer	Postponed	Al Nassr	Prince Abdullah bin Jalawi Stadium, Al Hasa
20:15 AST		Al Nassr has an UAFA Cup match

18 February 2013 Round 20	Al Nassr	2–0	Al Ettifaq	King Fahd International Stadium, Riyadh
20:20 AST	I. Alzubaidi (yellow card) 24'; Ayman Ftayni (yellow card) 56'; M. Alsahlawi 72'; M. Husain (yellow card) 73'; Bastos 76'	(Report)	Ahmed Mubarak (yellow card) 26'	Attendance: 2866; Referee: Fahad Almirdasi; Assistant referees: 1st Assistant: Abdulaziz Alkathiri; 2nd Assistant: Moaid Alsayeg; Fourth official: Abdulaziz Alfunaitel

3 March 2013 Round 21	Al Wahda	v	Al Nassr	King Abdulaziz Stadium, Mecca
20:25 AST

7 March 2013 Round 22	Al Nassr	v	Al Shabab	King Fahd International Stadium, Riyadh
20:25 AST

15 March 2013 Round 23	Najran	v	Al Nassr	Al Akhdoud Club Stadium, Najran
20:30 AST

29 March 2013 Round 24	Al Shoalah	v	Al Nassr	Al Shoalah Club Stadium, Al Kharj
20:35 AST

6 April 2013 Round 25	Al Nassr	v	Al Ahli	King Fahd International Stadium, Riyadh
20:35 AST

14 April 2013 Round 26	Al Nassr	v	Al Faisaly	King Fahd International Stadium, Riyadh
20:40 AST

=== 2012–13 Saudi Crown Prince Cup ===
==== Matches ====
Win Draw Loss Postponed

18 December 2012 Round of 16	Al Taawon	2–4	Al Nassr	King Abdullah Sport City Stadium, Buraidah
19:40 AST	Yassen Hamza (yellow card) 18'; Bouguèche 25'; Ahmed Alharbi 74' (pen.)		M. Alsahlawi 33'; H. Abd Rabo 35'; M. Alsahlawi 53'; H. Abd Rabo 66'	Attendance: 4420; Referee: Meree Alawagi

22 December 2012 quarter-final	Al Ahli	1–2	Al Nassr	King Abdulaziz Stadium, Mecca
19:40 AST	Mansoor Alharbi 6'; Ageel Balghath (yellow card) 46'		O. Hawsawi (yellow card) 5'; K. Alzylaeei 10'; Sh. Sharahili (yellow card) 63'; Abdoh Otaif 77'; A. Alenezi (yellow card) 90+3'	Attendance: 11036; Referee: Abdulrahman Alamri; Fourth official: Khalil Alghamdi

9 February 2013 Semi-finals	Al Raed	0–2	Al Nassr	King Abdullah Sport City Stadium, Buraidah
20:30 AST	Fawaz Fallatah (yellow card) 25'; Abdulaziz Aljebreen (yellow card) 39'; M. Alkhojali (yellow card) 87'; Ahmed Alkhair (yellow card) 90'		Bastos (yellow card) 6'; M. Husain (yellow card) 16'; Bastos 23'; M. Alsahlawi 88' (pen.)	Referee: Meree Alawagi

22 February 2013 Final	Al Hilal	1–1 (4–2 p)	Al Nassr	King Fahd International Stadium, Riyadh
20:00 AST	Ozéia (yellow card) 14'; M. Alqarni (yellow card) 36'; S. Albishi (yellow card) 43'; M. Alshalhoub 118' (pen.)		H. Abd Rabo (yellow card) 70'; I. Ghaleb (yellow card) 74'; Abdoh Otaif (yellow card) 97'; K. Alzylaeei (yellow card) 109'; H. Alraheb 120'	Referee: Gianluca Rocchi
	Penalties
	Y. Alqahtani (penalty scored); Ozéia (penalty scored); M. Massad (penalty missed); M. Alshalhoub (penalty scored); N. Alabed (penalty scored)		(penalty missed) H. Abd Rabo; (penalty scored) I. Ghaleb; (penalty missed) Charisteas; (penalty scored) H. Sulaimani

=== 2013 King Cup of Champions ===
==== Matches ====
Not announced yet.

=== 2012–13 UAFA Cup ===
The draw was made in June 2012, with Saudi Arabian teams Al Nassr and Al Fateh competing in the competition. Al Nassr was exempted from the first round (round of 32).

==== Matches ====
Win Draw Loss Postponed

===== Round of 16 =====
27 November 2012 First Leg	Al Nassr (Saudi Arabia)	3–0	(Bahrain) Al Hadd	King Fahd International Stadium, Riyadh
19:30 AST	Ayoví (yellow card) 55'; Mullajanov (yellow card) 65'; Ayoví 68' (pen.); S. Hamood 70'; M. Alsahlawi 77'		Eissa Musbeh (yellow card) 47'; Ahmad Alowaynati (yellow card) 49'; Mohammed Aashoor (yellow card) 67'	Attendance: 4784

5 December 2012 Second Leg	Al Hadd (Bahrain)	0–2	(Saudi Arabia) Al Nassr	Al Muharraq Stadium, Muharraq, Bahrain
18:30 AST	Ahmad Alowaynati (yellow card) 71' (yellow-red card) 90+3'; (yellow card) 75'		K. Alghamdi 32'; A. Alenezi (yellow card) 60'; A. Alqahtani 88'

===== Quarter-finals =====
13 February 2013 First Leg	Al Nassr (Saudi Arabia)	3–2	(Kuwait) Al Arabi	Prince Faisal bin Fahd Stadium, Riyadh
20:00 AST	Bastos 16'; H. Sulaimani (yellow card) 48'; Bastos (red card) 60'; H. Abd Rabo 64' (pen.); O. Hawsawi (yellow card) 76'; M. Alsahlawi 90+4'		Hayel 18'; H. Almoussawi 34'; A. Alsalimi (yellow card) 50'; A. Maqseed (yellow card) 62' (yellow-red card) 70'; T. Nayef (yellow card) 76'	Referee: Mohammed Abdulkarim

27 February 2013 Second Leg	Al Arabi (Kuwait)	v	(Saudi Arabia) Al Nassr	Sabah Al Salem Stadium, Kuwait City, Kuwait
19:00 AST

== Olympic Team Competitions ==
=== Olympic Team Goal Sccorer ===
Name	Federation Cup
Turki Sufyani	8
Ahmed Al-Jizani	6
Abdulellah Al-Nassar	4
Mosaab Al-Otaibi	3
Fahad Al-Yami	2
Ali Ftayni	2
Abdullah Madu	2
Nawaf Albishi	1
Abdualziz Al-Dhiyabi	1
Mana'a Alenezi	1
Fahad Al-Rashidi	1
Abdulaziz Almufaireaj	1

=== 2012–13 Saudi Federation Cup U-21 ===
==== Results summary ====
Overall								Home						Away					
Pld	W	D	L	GF	GA	GD	Pts	W	D	L	GF	GA	GD	W	D	L	GF	GA	GD
17	9	3	5	32	22	+10	30	5	2	1	19	10	+9	4	1	4	13	12	+1

==== Matches ====
Win Draw Loss Postponed

25 August 2012 Round 1	Al Faisaly U21	0–1	Al Nassr U21
17:30 AST	Zeyad (penalty missed)		Fahad Alyami 71'

30 August 2012 Round 2	Al Nassr U21	4–2	Al Fateh U21	King Fahd International Stadium, Riyadh
17:25 AST	Ahmed Aljaizani 32'; Ahmed Aljaizani 67'; Ahmed Aljaizani 72'; Nawaf Al-Bishi 86'		Mobark Al-Sultan 15'; Mobark Al-Sultan 45'

5 September 2012 Round 3	Al Ettifaq U21	3–0	Al Nassr U21
16:00 AST	Hazza'a Alhazza'a; Ayman Masrahi; Abdullah Alsalim

16 September 2012 Round 4	Al Nassr U21	2–2	Al Ahli U21
15:55 AST	Abdulelah Alnassar 41'; Ali Ftayni 85'		Mu'ataz Hawsawi 26' (pen.); Esmaeel Magribi 28'

25 September 2012 Round 5	Al Shoalah U21	3–1	Al Nassr U21
15:50 AST	Fahad Almontashiri; Mohammed Aldosari; Sa'ad Aldosari		Turki Alsufiani

4 October 2012 Round 6	Al Nassr U21	4–1	Hajer U21
15:40 AST	Turki Alsufiani 21'; Turki Alsufiani (red card) 31'; Ali Ftayni 33'; Abdullah Mado 62'; Abdulaziz Aldheyabi 66' (pen.)		Alobaid (yellow card) 37' (yellow-red card) 38'; Alnadhiri 52' (pen.)

16 October 2012 Round 7	Al Nassr U21	2–1	Najran U21	Prince Faisal bin Fahd Stadium, Riyadh
15:35 AST	Abdulelah Alnassar; Ahmed Aljaizani	(Report)

16 October 2012 Round 8	Al Shabab U21	1–2	Al Nassr U21	Al Shabab Club Stadium, Riyadh
15:30 AST		(Report)	Turki Alsufiani; Fahad Alyami

5 November 2012 Round 9	Al Nassr U21	2–1	Al Ittihad U21	Prince Faisal bin Fahd Stadium, Riyadh
15:15 AST	Ahmed Aljaizani; Mus'ab Alotaibi	(Report)

11 November 2012 Round 10	Al Hilal U21	0–0	Al Nassr U21	Prince Faisal bin Fahd Stadium, Riyadh
15:10 AST		(Report)

20 November 2012 Round 11	Al Nassr U21	1–2	Al Wahda U21	King Fahd International Stadium, Riyadh
15:10 AST	Abdulelah Alnassar	(Report)

26 November 2012 Round 12	Al Taawon U21	1–3	Al Nassr U21	King Abdullah Sport City Stadium, Buraidah
15:15 AST		(Report)	Turki Alsufiani 19'; Ahmed Aljaizani 60'; Mana'a Alenezi 75'

24 December 2012 Round 13	Al Raed U21	1–0	Al Nassr U21	Buraidah
15:20 AST	Penalty missed	(Report)

23 January 2013 Round 14	Al Nassr U21	1–1	Al Faisaly U21	Prince Abdulrahman bin Saud Stadium, Riyadh
15:30 AST	Fahad Alrashedi	(Report)

28 January 2013 Round 15	Al Fateh U21	0–5	Al Nassr U21
15:25 AST		(Report)	Mus'ab Alotaibi; Mus'ab Alotaibi; Turki Alsufiani; Turki Alsufiani; Abdulaziz Almufaireaj

5 February 2013 Round 16	Al Nassr U21	3–0	Al Ettifaq U21	Prince Abdulrahman bin Saud Stadium, Riyadh
15:45 AST	Abdulelah Alnassar 19'; Turki Alsufiani 44'; Turki Alsufiani 87'	(Report)

11 February 2013 Round 17	Al Ahli U21	3–1	Al Nassr U21
16:20 AST		(Report)	Abdullah Mado

19 February 2013 Round 18	Al Nassr U21	v	Al Shoalah U21
15:50 AST

25 February 2013 Round 19	Hajer U21	v	Al Nassr U21
15:40 AST

5 March 2013 Round 20	Najran U21	v	Al Nassr U21
16:10 AST

9 March 2013 Round 21	Al Nassr U21	v	Al Shabab U21
16:00 AST

13 March 2013 Round 22	Al Ittihad U21	v	Al Nassr U21
16:25 AST

23 March 2013 Round 23	Al Nassr U21	v	Al Hilal U21
16:00 AST

27 March 2013 Round 24	Al Wahda U21	v	Al Nassr U21
16:25 AST

4 April 2013 Round 25	Al Nassr U21	v	Al Taawon U21
20:35 AST

8 April 2013 Round 26	Al Nassr U21	v	Al Raed U21
20:35 AST

== Youth Team Competitions ==
=== Youth Team Goal Sccorer ===
Name	League	Cup	Total
Ayman Ftayni	2	5	7
Ammer Jahvali	3	2	5
Mohammed Alshahrani	2	1	3
Abdullah Aldosari	0	2	2
Abdullah Sufiani	0	2	2
Tareq Alawad	2	0	2
Zahran Alzahrani	2	0	2
Hamad Aldosari	2	0	2
Abdullah Shabeeb	0	1	1

==== Results summary ====
Overall								Home						Away					
Pld	W	D	L	GF	GA	GD	Pts	W	D	L	GF	GA	GD	W	D	L	GF	GA	GD
10	6	1	3	13	11	+2	19	4	0	1	7	2	+5	2	1	2	6	9	−3

==== Matches ====
Win Draw Loss Postponed

23 November 2012 Round 1	Najran U20	0–1	Al Nassr U20
15:30 AST		(Report)	Ammer Jahfali

30 November 2012 Round 2	Al Nassr U20	1–0	Al Shabab U20
15:10 AST	Ammer Jahfali	(Report)

6 December 2012 Round 3	Al Ahli U20	1–2	Al Nassr U20	Al Ahli Club Stadium, Jeddah
15:40 AST		(Report)	Ayman Ftayni; Ammer Jahfali

13 December 2012 Round 4	Al Nassr U20	2–1	Al Taawon U20	Al Nassr Club Reserve Stadium, Riyadh
15:10 AST	Hamad Aldosari; Zahran Alzahrani	(Report)

19 December 2012 Round 5	Al Wahda U20	2–2	Al Nassr U20
15:45 AST		(Report)	Ayman Ftayni; Tareq Alawad

28 December 2012 Round 6	Al Nassr U20	0–1	Al Ettifaq U20	Prince Abdulrahman bin Saud Stadium, Riyadh
15:15 AST		(Report)

24 January 2013 Round 7	Al Nassr U20	1–0	Al Qadisiyah U20
15:35 AST	Tareq Alawad	(Report)

30 January 2013 Round 8	Al Hilal U20	4–1	Al Nassr U20	Prince Faisal bin Fahd Stadium, Riyadh
15:40 AST		(Report)	Zahran Alzahrani pen.' Adel Dannah (red card); Ryan Alshannar (red card); Tareq Alawad (red card)

7 February 2013 Round 9	Al Nassr U20	3–0	Al Ittihad U20	Prince Abdulrahman bin Saud Stadium, Riyadh
15:45 AST	Hamad Aldosari; Muhammed Alshahrani; Muhammed Alshahrani	(Report)

15 February 2013 Round 10	Hajer U20	2–0	Al Nassr U20
15:35 AST		(Report)

22 February 2013 Round 11	Al Nassr U20	v	Al Fateh U20
16:00 AST

=== 2011–12 Saudi Federation Cup U-20 ===
There were three groups in the competition. Teams that achieved first place in their group automatically qualified into the knockout stage, along with the best second placed team.

==== Group stage ====
Win Draw Loss Postponed

7 September 2012 Round 1	Najran U20	2–3	Al Nassr U20
16:15 AST	Penalty missed		Ayman Ftayni; Ayman Ftayni; Ammer Jahvali

13 September 2012 Round 2	Al Nassr U20	2–0	Al Taawon U20
16:00 AST	Abdullah Aldosari; Abdullah Aldosari

21 September 2012 Round 3	Al Nassr U20	1–2	Al Qadisiyah U20
15:55 AST	Ammer Jahvali

5 October 2012 Round 4	Al Nassr U20	3–1	Najran U20
15:40 AST	Abdullah Sufiani; Ayman Ftayni; Ayman Ftayni

12 October 2012 Round 5	Al Taawon U20	3–2	Al Nassr U20
15:45 AST			Ayman Ftayni; Abdullah Sufiani

18 October 2012 Round 6	Al Qadisiyah U20	0–2	Al Nassr U20
15:10 AST	Abdullah Shabeeb; Mohammed Alshahrani

Pos	Team	Pld	W	D	L	GF	GA	GD	Pts
3	Al Taawon U20	6	4	1	1	9	7	+2	13
1	Al Nassr U20	6	4	0	2	13	8	+5	12
2	Al Qadisiyah U20	6	3	1	2	14	7	+7	10
4	Najran U20	6	0	0	6	5	19	−19	0

Al Taawon U20 won the group stage and went to the knockout stage, with Al Alahli U20 named the best second place after acquiring 14 points in the group stage.

== Youngster Team Competitions ==
=== Youngster Team Goal Sccorer ===
Name	League	Cup	Total
Mohammed Al-Shahrani	17	2	19
Khaled Alghamdi	2	4	6
Abdulaziz Alheresh	4	1	5
Abdulelah Alenezi	2	2	4
Abdulrahman Alhajiri	3	1	4
Abdullah Alhlaiyl	4	0	4
Khaled Al-Showaie	1	2	3
Sa'ad Alshammari	2	0	2
Mazen Aldosari	0	1	1
Abdulelah Alhammaad	0	1	1
Waleed Sahari	1	0	1
Sultan Alfuhaid	1	0	1
Sami Al-Najei	1	0	1
Abdulrahman Al-Shanar	1	0	1

=== 2012–13 Youngster League U-17 ===
==== Results summary ====
Overall								Home						Away					
Pld	W	D	L	GF	GA	GD	Pts	W	D	L	GF	GA	GD	W	D	L	GF	GA	GD
12	8	3	1	39	11	+28	27	5	1	0	28	6	+22	3	2	1	11	5	+6

==== Matches ====
Win Draw Loss Postponed

8 November 2012 Round 1	Al Taawon U17	1–3	Al Nassr U17	King Abdullah Sport City Stadium, Buraidah
15:10 AST		(Report)	Muhammed Alshahrani; Muhammed Alshahrani; Muhammed Alshahrani

16 November 2012 Round 2	Al Nassr U17	3–0	Al Wahda U17	Prince Abdulrahman bin Saud Stadium, Riyadh
15:10 AST	Abdulaziz Alheresh; Abdulaziz Alheresh; Muhammed Alshahrani	(Report)

21 November 2012 Round 3	Al Ahli U17	1–1	Al Nassr U17	Al Ahli Club Stadium, Jeddah
15:40 AST	, pen.'	(Report)	Waleed Sahari; Waleed Sahari (red card)

29 November 2012 Round 4	Al Nassr U17	1–1	Al Hilal U17	King Fahd International Stadium, Riyadh
15:10 AST	Khalid Alshuwayia 90'	(Report)

5 December 2012 Round 5	Al Ettifaq U17	2–1	Al Nassr U17	Al Ettifaq Club Stadium, Dammam
14:50 AST		(Report)	Sultan Alfuhaid 50'

14 December 2012 Round 6	Al Nassr U17	4–0	Al Arabi U17	Al Nassr Club Reserve Stadium, Riyadh
15:10 AST	Sami Alnaja'ai; Muhammed Alshahrani; Muhammed Alshahrani; Abdullah Alhlaiyl	(Report)

20 December 2012 Round 7	Al Ta'ee U17	0–3	Al Nassr U17
15:25 AST		(Report)	Muhammed Alshahrani; Muhammed Alshahrani; Khalid Alghamdi

27 December 2012 Round 8	Al Nassr U17	5–3	Al Ittihad U17	Prince Abdulrahman bin Saud Stadium, Riyadh
15:15 AST	Abdullah Alhlaiyl; Muhammed Alshahrani; Abdulelah Alenezi; Abdulelah Alenezi; Abdulrahman Alhajiri	(Report)

25 January 2013 Round 9	Al Qadisiyah U17	0–2	Al Nassr U17
15:20 AST		(Report)	Muhammed Alshahrani; Muhammed Alshahrani

1 February 2013 Round 10	Al Shabab U17	Postponed	Al Nassr U17
15:50 AST		Al Nassr U17 is participating in an international friendly tournament

8 February 2013 Round 11	Al Nassr U17	8–1	Al Oyoun U17	Prince Abdulrahman bin Saud Stadium, Riyadh
15:45 AST	Abdullah Alhlaiyl; Sa'ad Alshammari; Sa'ad Alshammari; Muhammed Alshahrani; Muhammed Alshahrani; Abdulrahman Alhajiri; Abdulrahman Alhajiri; Khalid Alghamdi	(Report)

14 February 2013 Round 12	Al Nassr U17	7–1	Al Taawon U17	Prince Abdulrahman bin Saud Stadium, Riyadh
15:45 AST	Abdullah Alhlaiyl; Abdulrahman Alshannar; Muhammed Alshahrani; Muhammed Alshahrani; Muhammed Alshahrani; Abdulaziz Alheresh; Abdulaziz Alheresh	(Report)

21 February 2013 Round 13	Al Wahda U17	1–1	Al Nassr U17
16:20 AST		(Report)	Muhammed Alshahrani

27 February 2013 Round 14	Al Nassr U17	v	Al Ahli U17	Prince Abdulrahman bin Saud Stadium, Riyadh

4 March 2013 Round 10	Al Shabab U17	v	Al Nassr U17

8 March 2013 Round 15	Al Hilal U17	v	Al Nassr U17

14 March 2013 Round 16	Al Nassr U17	v	Al Ettifaq U17

=== 2012–13 Saudi Federation Cup U-17 ===
There were 3 groups in the competition. Teams that achieved first place in their group qualified automatically to the knockout stage along with the best second place team.

==== Group stage ====
Win Draw Loss Postponed

6 September 2012 Round 1	Al Nassr U17	1–2	Al Taawon U17
16:05 AST	Khaled Alghamdi

14 September 2012 Round 2	Al Ta'ee U17	1–3	Al Nassr U17
16:30 AST			Mazen Aldosari; Khaled Alghamdi; Abdulaziz Alheresh

20 September 2012 Round 3	Al Nassr U17	1–3	Al Hilal U17
15:55 AST	64' (o.g.)		Mut'eb Almufarraj 11'; Nasser Aloweran 73'; Nasser Aloweran 90'

27 September 2012 Round 4	Al Taawon U17	1–4	Al Nassr U17
15:55 AST			Abdulelah Alhammaad; Abdulelah Alenezi; Abdulelah Alenezi; Abdulrahman Alhajiri

4 October 2012 Round 5	Al Nassr U17	3–1	Al Ta'ee U17
15:40 AST	Muhammed Alshahrani; Muhammed Alshahrani; Khaled Alghamdi

11 October 2012 Round 6	Al Hilal U17	1–3	Al Nassr U17
15:30 AST	33'		Khalid Alshuwayia 1'; Khaled Alghamdi 48'; Khalid Alshuwayia 88' (pen.)

Pos	Team	Pld	W	D	L	GF	GA	GD	Pts
1	Al Taawon U17	6	4	1	1	12	10	+2	13
2	Al Nassr U17	6	4	0	2	15	9	+6	12
3	Al Hilal U17	6	3	1	2	16	10	+6	10
4	Al Ta'ee U17	6	0	0	6	6	20	−14	0

Al Taawon won the group stage and went to the knockout stage. Al Ittihad was named best second place team after acquiring 13 points in the group stage.
