= 2011–12 Al-Nassr FC season =

Al Nassr FC
2011–12 season
- Chairman: (Saudi Arabia) Prince Faisal Bin Turki Bin Nasser
- Manager: (Colombia) Francisco Maturana
- Stadium: King Fahd Stadium and Prince Faisal bin Fahd Stadium
- 2011–12 Saudi Professional League: 6th
- 2011-12 Saudi Federation Cup U-23: 5th
- 2011 AFC Champions League: Round of 16
- 2011-12 Crown Prince Cup: Quarter-final
- 2012 King Cup of Champions: Final
- 2011 Baniyas International Tournament: Winners
- Top goalscorer: League: Al Sahlawi (15); All: Al Sahlawi (17)
- Highest home attendance: 15492
- Lowest home attendance: 1576
| Home colours | Away colours | Third colours |

The 2011–12 season was Al-Nassr's 36th consecutive season in the top flight of Saudi football and 56th year in existence as a football club.

== Preseason preparation ==
=== New Coach ===
| Signing Date | Nat. | Name | Age | From |
|---|---|---|---|---|
| 10 December 2011 | (Colombia) | Francisco Maturana | 63 | Free Transfer |

=== New Team Logo ===
Left: The Old Logo, Right: The New Logo

On 11 August 2011, the club's chairman Prince Faisal Bin Turki Bin Nasser showed for the first time the team's new logo. The event was held during half time of a friendly match between Al Nassr's first team and Al Nassr's U-23 team in Prince Abdulrahman Bin Saud Stadium.

=== New Kits ===
On 4 September 2011, the club presented the 2011-12 kits for the first time. From right to left, no. 16 Fahad Al-Rashedi wearing the Home kit, no. 8 Juan Mercier wearing the Away kit and no. 4 Omar Hawsawi wearing the 3rd Kit.

Kit providers: Nike
Sponsor(s): STC.

=== Sad news for the team ===
On 19 August 2011, the young Al-Nassr and Saudi Arabia Olympic team striker Saud Hamood had an Anterior cruciate ligament injury when he joined the Saudi Arabian U-23 team in the Gulf Cup U-23 tournament. The surgery was successful. However, he will need 6 months before he can play any match.

=== The birth of Ultras Al Nassr ===
Late July 2011, the idea of creating an Ultras began to invade Al-Nassr's forums and chat groups. And with the new season nearing to begin, a group of Al-Nassr's faithful fans have created "The Sun Knights" or Ultras Al-Nassr. A group that follows the team, whenever and where ever there is a match they play, to support the team's players by holding banners and singing songs. Their main nasheed is called "Faltasmot Addonia" (فلتصمت الدنيا, lit. 'Let the world be silent').

== Players ==
All ages are calculated to September 1, 2011.

=== Squad information ===
| P | No. | Nat. | Name | Age | Other |
|---|---|---|---|---|---|
| GK | 1 | (Saudi Arabia) | Khalid Radhy | 30 | |
| RB | 2 | (Saudi Arabia) | Waleed Al-Taya | 22 | |
| LB | 3 | (Saudi Arabia) | Abdoh Bernaoy | 27 | |
| CB | 4 | (Saudi Arabia) | Omar Hawsawi | 26 | |
| CB | 5 | (Algeria) | Antar Yahia | 29 | (1/3) Non-Saudi and Not Asian |
| CM | 6 | (Saudi Arabia) | Ahmad Abbas | 26 | |
| LM | 7 | (Saudi Arabia) | Abdulrahman Al-Qahtani | 28 | |
| CF | 10 | (Saudi Arabia) | Mohammad Al-Sahlawi | 24 | |
| RB | 12 | (Saudi Arabia) | Khalid Al-Ghamdi | 23 | |
| CB | 13 | (Saudi Arabia) | Mohamed Eid | 24 | |
| DM | 14 | (Saudi Arabia) | Ibrahim Ghaleb | 21 | Youth system |
| DM | 15 | (Saudi Arabia) | Abdulaziz Fallatah | 25 | |
| CM | 16 | (Saudi Arabia) | Fahd Al-Rashidi | 20 | Youth system |
| RM | 17 | (Saudi Arabia) | Nasser Al-Saleh | | Youth system |
| CF | 19 | (Saudi Arabia) | Malek Mouath | 30 | |
| SS | 20 | (Colombia) | Juan Pablo Pino | 24 | (2/3) Non-Saudi and Not Asian |
| GK | 21 | (Saudi Arabia) | Kamil Al-Wabari | 25 | |
| GK | 22 | (Saudi Arabia) | Abdullah Al-Enezi | 21 | |
| SS | 23 | (Saudi Arabia) | Saud Hamood | 22 | Source |
| LB | 24 | (Saudi Arabia) | Hussein Sulaimani (captain) | 34 | |
| AM | 25 | (Saudi Arabia) | Khaled Al-Zylaeei | 24 | |
| RB | 26 | (Saudi Arabia) | Shaye Sharahili | 22 | Youth system |
| LM | 27 | (Saudi Arabia) | Abdulellah Al-Nassar | 20 | Youth system |
| ST | 29 | (Saudi Arabia) | Ryan Belal | 23 | |
| LB | 30 | (Saudi Arabia) | Adnan Fallatah | 28 | |
| GK | 31 | (Saudi Arabia) | Abdullah Al-Shammeri | | Youth system |
| DM | 32 | (Saudi Arabia) | Abdulaziz Al-Aazmi | 20 | Youth system |
| RM | 33 | (Saudi Arabia) | Abdulaziz Al-Dhiyabi | 19 | Youth system |
| ST | 35 | (Saudi Arabia) | Ahmed Al-Jizani | | Youth system |

=== Summer Transfers ===
==== In ====
| | No. | Nat. | Name | Age | From | Type | Ends | Other info |
|---|---|---|---|---|---|---|---|---|
| CB | 5 | (Algeria) | Antar Yahia | 29 | (Germany) VfL Bochum | Transfer | 2013 | (1/3) Non-Saudi and Not Asian |
| RB | 2 | (Saudi Arabia) | Waleed Al-Taya | 22 | (Saudi Arabia) Al Hazm | Transfer | | |
| LB | 30 | (Saudi Arabia) | Adnan Fallatah | 27 | (Saudi Arabia) Al Ittihad | Transfer | 2013 | |
| RB | 12 | (Saudi Arabia) | Khalid Al-Ghamdi | 23 | (Saudi Arabia) Al Qadisiyah | Transfer | 2013 | Many problems happened before this deal was made |
| DM | 8 | (Argentina) | Juan Mercier | 31 | (Argentina) Argentinos Juniors | Transfer | 2013 | (2/3) Non-Saudi and Not Asian |
| DM | 15 | (Saudi Arabia) | Abdullaaziz Fallatah | 25 | (Saudi Arabia) Al Qadisiyah | Transfer | 2014 | |
| MF | 20 | (Colombia) | Juan Pablo Pino | 24 | (Turkey) Galatasaray | Loan | 2012 | (3/3) Non-Saudi and Not Asian |
| MF | - | (Saudi Arabia) | Ahmed Al-Hadhrami | 22 | (Saudi Arabia) Al Fateh | Return Loan | 2012 | |
| FW | 19 | (Saudi Arabia) | Malek Mouath | 30 | (Saudi Arabia) Al Ahli | Loan | 2012 | |
| FW | - | (Saudi Arabia) | Mohammed Al-Shahrani | 25 | (Saudi Arabia) Al Ettifaq | Return Loan | 2012 | |

==== Professional contract ====
| | No. | Nat. | Name | Age | Ends |
|---|---|---|---|---|---|
| CB | - | (Saudi Arabia) | Osama Ashoor | 21 | 2014 |
| RB | 26 | (Saudi Arabia) | Shaya Ali Sharahili | 22 | 2014 |
| DM | 6 | (Saudi Arabia) | Ahmad Abbas | 25 | 2014 |
| LM | - | (Saudi Arabia) | Mosaab Al-Otaibi | 19 | 2014 |

==== Out ====
| | No. | Nat. | Name | Age | To | Type | Other info |
|---|---|---|---|---|---|---|---|
| CB | 31 | (Australia) | Jonathan McKain | 28 | (Australia) Adelaide United FC | Transfer | |
| RB | 2 | (Saudi Arabia) | Ahmed Al-Dokhi | 34 | | End of contract | |
| LB | 4 | (Saudi Arabia) | Abdulakreem Al-Khaibari | 31 | (Saudi Arabia) Al Qadisiyah | Loan | 1 year loan |
| DM | 5 | (Romania) | Ovidiu Petre | 29 | (Italy) Modena F.C. | Transfer | |
| MF | 8 | (Argentina) | Víctor Figueroa | 27 | (Argentina) Newell's Old Boys | Transfer | |
| MF | - | (Saudi Arabia) | Ahmed Al-Hadrami | 22 | (Saudi Arabia) Al Raed | Loan | 1 year loan |
| FW | 16 | (Kuwait) | Bader Al-Mutwa | 26 | (Kuwait) Qadsia SC | Loan return | |
| FW | - | (Saudi Arabia) | Mohammed Al-Shahrani | 25 | | Contract Termination | |

=== Winter Transfer ===
==== In ====
| | No. | Nat. | Name | Age | From | Type | Ends | Other info |
|---|---|---|---|---|---|---|---|---|
| SS | 99 | (Brazil) | Wagner | 25 | (South Korea) Daejeon Citizen | Transfer | End Season | (1/3) Non-Saudi and Not Asian |
| RM | 77 | (South Korea) | Kim Byung-Suk | 26 | (Japan) Sagan Tosu | Transfer | End Season | (1/1) Non-Saudi |
| DM | 66 | (Saudi Arabia) | Khaled Aziz | 30 | (Saudi Arabia) Al-Shabab | Transfer | 2014 | |
| CF | | (Saudi Arabia) | Abdulaziz Al-Saran | 28 | (Saudi Arabia) Al-Shabab | Transfer | 2015 | |
| CF | 83 | (Algeria) | Hadj Bouguèche | 28 | (Saudi Arabia) Al Qadisiyah | Transfer | 2013 | (2/3) Non-Saudi and Not Asian |
| RB | | (Saudi Arabia) | Talal Assiri | 24 | (Saudi Arabia) Najran SC | Transfer | 2017 | |
| AM | | (Brazil) | Vinícius Reche | 28 | (Brazil) Desportivo Brasil | Transfer | End Season | (3/3) Non-Saudi and Not Asian |
| GK | | (Saudi Arabia) | Mutab Asiri | | (Saudi Arabia) Abha | Transfer | 2017 | |
| CB | | (Saudi Arabia) | Sultan Tamihi | | (Saudi Arabia) AL-Rbeea | Transfer | | |
| CB | | (Saudi Arabia) | Ahmed Al-Zahri | | (Saudi Arabia) Al-Wahda | Transfer | | |

==== Professional contract ====
| CF | 35 | (Saudi Arabia) | Ahmed Al-Jizani | | 2015 |
|---|---|---|---|---|---|
| AM | 16 | (Saudi Arabia) | Fahad Al-Rashidi | 20 | 2017 |
| RM | 33 | (Saudi Arabia) | Abdulaziz Al-Dhiyabi | 19 | 2017 |
| LM | 27 | (Saudi Arabia) | Abdulellah Al-Nassar | 20 | 2017 |
| DM | - | (Saudi Arabia) | Khaled Al-Suqaihi | | 2015 |

==== Out ====
| | No. | Nat. | Name | Age | To | Type | Other info |
|---|---|---|---|---|---|---|---|
| SS | 11 | (Saudi Arabia) | Saad Al-Harthi | 28 | (Saudi Arabia) Al-Hilal | Transfer | |
| GK | 28 | (Saudi Arabia) | Hussein Rabia | 22 | | Contract Termination | |
| CM | 8 | (Argentina) | Juan Ignacio Mercier | 32 | (United Arab Emirates) Al Wasl | Transfer | |
| CB | 18 | (Saudi Arabia) | Abdullah Al-Garni | 24 | (Saudi Arabia) Al Qadisiyah | Transfer | |
| CB | 5 | (Algeria) | Antar Yahia | 29 | (Germany) 1. FC Kaiserslautern | Transfer | |
| ST | 29 | (Saudi Arabia) | Ryan Belal | 23 | (Saudi Arabia) Al Qadisiyah | Loan | End Season loan |
| SS | 20 | (Colombia) | Juan Pablo Pino | 24 | | Contract Loan Termination | |
| RB | 2 | (Saudi Arabia) | Waleed Al-Taya | 22 | | Contract Termination | |

== Statistics ==
=== Player Stats ===
| | | | | Total | | | | SPL | | CPC | | KCC | | |
| N | Pos. | Name | Nat. | GS | App | Gls | Min | App | Gls | App | Gls | App | Gls | Notes |
|---|---|---|---|---|---|---|---|---|---|---|---|---|---|---|
| 1 | GK | Radi | (Saudi Arabia) | 6 | 6 | -10 | 540 | 6 | -10 | | | | | (−) denotes goals conceded |
| 22 | GK | A. Anzi | (Saudi Arabia) | 1 | 1 | | 90 | 1 | | | | | | (−) denotes goals conceded |
| 21 | GK | K. Wabari | (Saudi Arabia) | | | | | | | | | | | (−) denotes goals conceded |
| 26 | RB | Sh. Sharahili | (Saudi Arabia) | | | | | | | | | | | |
| 12 | RB | K. Ghamdi | (Saudi Arabia) | 4 | 4 | | 360 | 4 | | | | | | |
| 4 | CB | Omar | (Saudi Arabia) | 4 | 5 | | 416 | 5 | | | | | | |
| 5 | CB | Yahia | (Algeria) | 6 | 6 | | 484 | 6 | | | | | | |
| 13 | CB | M. Eid | (Saudi Arabia) | 7 | 7 | | 630 | 7 | | | | | | |
| 24 | LB | H. Sulaimani | (Saudi Arabia) | 4 | 4 | | 360 | 4 | | | | | | |
| 3 | LB | A. Barnawi | (Saudi Arabia) | 1 | 2 | | 114 | 2 | | | | | | |
| 30 | LB | Adnan | (Saudi Arabia) | 3 | 3 | | 270 | 3 | | | | | | |
| 6 | DM | A. Abbas | (Saudi Arabia) | 3 | 3 | 1 | 206 | 3 | 1 | | | | | |
| 8 | DM | Mercier | (Argentina) | 6 | 6 | | 540 | 6 | | | | | | |
| 14 | DM | Ibra | (Saudi Arabia) | 5 | 5 | | 450 | 5 | | | | | | |
| 16 | MF | F. Rashidi | (Saudi Arabia) | 1 | 1 | | 71 | 1 | | | | | | |
| 15 | DM | A. Fallatah | (Saudi Arabia) | 2 | 5 | | 198 | 5 | | | | | | |
| 7 | LM | A. Q. | (Saudi Arabia) | 2 | 3 | | 154 | 3 | | | | | | |
| 25 | MF | K. Zylaeei | (Saudi Arabia) | 4 | 6 | 1 | 354 | 6 | 1 | | | | | |
| 20 | MF | Pino | (Colombia) | 6 | 7 | 2 | 529 | 7 | 2 | | | | | |
| 17 | MF | N. Saleh | (Saudi Arabia) | | | | | | | | | | | |
| 10 | FW | Al Sahlawi | (Saudi Arabia) | 4 | 6 | 2 | 346 | 6 | 2 | | | | | |
| 11 | FW | Saad | (Saudi Arabia) | 1 | 2 | | 61 | 2 | | | | | | |
| 19 | FW | Malek | (Saudi Arabia) | 4 | 7 | 2 | 406 | 7 | 2 | | | | | |
| 29 | CF | R. Belal | (Saudi Arabia) | 3 | 5 | 1 | 306 | 5 | 1 | | | | | |

Last updated: 14 November
Source: Competitive matches
Ordered by
0 shown as blank

=== Disciplinary records ===
| No. | Pos. | Nat. | Player | | | | Other |
|---|---|---|---|---|---|---|---|
| 1 | GK | (Saudi Arabia) | Radi | 0 | 0 | 0 |
| 22 | GK | (Saudi Arabia) | A. Anzi | 0 | 0 | 0 |
| 21 | GK | (Saudi Arabia) | K. Wabari | 0 | 0 | 0 |
| 26 | RB | (Saudi Arabia) | Sh. Sharahili | 0 | 0 | 0 |
| 12 | RB | (Saudi Arabia) | K. Ghamdi | 0 | 0 | 0 |
| 4 | CB | (Saudi Arabia) | Omar | 1 | 0 | 0 |
| 5 | CB | (Algeria) | Yahia | 1 | 0 | 0 |
| 13 | CB | (Saudi Arabia) | M. Eid | 2 | 0 | 0 |
| 24 | LB | (Saudi Arabia) | H. Sulaimani | 0 | 0 | 0 | Suspend for 3 Matches [4,5,6] (Disciplinary) |
| 3 | LB | (Saudi Arabia) | A. Bernaoy | 0 | 0 | 0 |
| 30 | LB | (Saudi Arabia) | Adnan | 1 | 0 | 0 |
| 6 | DM | (Saudi Arabia) | A. Abbas | 1 | 0 | 0 |
| 8 | DM | (Argentina) | Mercier | 4 | 0 | 0 | Suspend for 1 Match [6] (3 Yel.) |
| 14 | DM | (Saudi Arabia) | Ibra | 2 | 0 | 0 |
| 16 | MF | (Saudi Arabia) | Fahd | 0 | 0 | 0 |
| 15 | DM | (Saudi Arabia) | A. Fallatah | 1 | 0 | 0 |
| 7 | LM | (Saudi Arabia) | A. Q | 0 | 0 | 0 |
| 25 | MF | (Saudi Arabia) | K. Zylaeei | 0 | 0 | 0 |
| 20 | MF | (Colombia) | Pino | 1 | 0 | 0 |
| 17 | MF | (Saudi Arabia) | N. Saleh | 0 | 0 | 0 |
| 10 | FW | (Saudi Arabia) | Al Sahlawi | 0 | 0 | 0 |
| 10 | FW | (Saudi Arabia) | Saad | 1 | 0 | 0 |
| 19 | FW | (Saudi Arabia) | Malek | 0 | 0 | 0 |
| 29 | CF | (Saudi Arabia) | R. Belal | 1 | 0 | 0 |

Last updated on 14 November.

== Competitions ==
=== Friendlies ===
Win Draw Loss Postponed

| 11 Aug 2011 Friendly | Al Nassr (Saudi Arabia) | 6 – 0 | (Saudi Arabia) Al Nassr U-23 | Prince Abdulrahman Bin Saud stadium, Riyadh |
| 19:00 GMT | Al Zylaeei; Abdulrahman Al-Qahtani; Al Harthi; Abdulakreem Al-Khaibari; Al Sahlawi; Al Sahlawi |

| 17 Aug 2011 Friendly | Al Jazira (United Arab Emirates) | 1 – 1 | (Saudi Arabia) Al Nassr | Abu Dhabi, UAE |
| 18:00 GMT | Abdulsalaam Jumaa (pen.) | | Ahmed Al-Gizani |

| 23 Aug 2011 Friendly | Al Dhafra (United Arab Emirates) | 0 – 2 | (Saudi Arabia) Al Nassr | Abu Dhabi, UAE |
| 18:00 GMT | | | Al Harthi (pen.); Abdulelah Al-Nassar |

| 28 Aug 2011 Friendly | Al Nassr (Saudi Arabia) | 1 – 0 | (Saudi Arabia) Al Fateh | Prince Abdulrahman Bin Saud stadium, Riyadh |
| 19:00 GMT | Al Harthi 38'; Juan Mercier (penalty missed) |

=== 2011 Baniyas International Tournament ===
The team's captain Hussein Sulaimani was named the MVP of the tournament.

Win Draw Loss Postponed

| 16 Aug 2011 Round 1 | Baniyas (United Arab Emirates) | 2 – 1 | (Saudi Arabia) Al Nassr | Baniyas Stadium, Baniyas, UAE |
| 18:00 GMT | Nawaf Mubarak 5'; Fareed Ismaeel 47' | | Al Sahlawi 61' | Man of the Match: Hussein Sulaimani |

| 19 Aug 2011 Round 2 | Al Nassr (Saudi Arabia) | 2 – 1 | (Tunisia) Sfaxien | Baniyas Stadium, Baniyas, UAE |
| 18:00 GMT | Omar Hawsawi (red card) 50'; Ahmed Al-Gizani 66'; Al Zylaeei 80' | | Rabii Ouerghemmi 71' | Man of the Match: Juan Mercier |

| 22 Aug 2011 Round 3 | Al Nassr (Saudi Arabia) | 4 – 1 | (Syria) Al-Jaish | Baniyas Stadium, Baniyas, UAE |
| 18:00 GMT | Al Zylaeei 15'; Abdulrahman Al-Qahtani 58'; Ahmed Al-Gizani 63'; Al Harthi 90+3' | | Hadi Al Malt 75' | Man of the Match: Khaled Al-Zylaeei |

| Pos | Team | Pld | W | D | L | GF | GA | GD | Pts |
|---|---|---|---|---|---|---|---|---|---|
| 1 | (Saudi Arabia) Al Nassr | 3 | 2 | 0 | 1 | 7 | 4 | +3 | 6 |
| 2 | (Tunisia) Sfaxien | 3 | 2 | 0 | 1 | 7 | 4 | +3 | 6 |
| 3 | (United Arab Emirates) Baniyas | 3 | 2 | 0 | 1 | 4 | 3 | +1 | 6 |
| 4 | (Syria) Al-Jaish | 3 | 0 | 0 | 3 | 2 | 9 | −7 | 0 |

Baniyas International Tournament on goalzz.com.

=== 2011–12 Saudi Professional League ===
==== Results summary ====
| Overall | | | | | | | | Home | | | | | | Away | | | | | |
| Pld | W | D | L | GF | GA | GD | Pts | W | D | L | GF | GA | GD | W | D | L | GF | GA | GD |
|---|---|---|---|---|---|---|---|---|---|---|---|---|---|---|---|---|---|---|---|
| 22 | 9 | 4 | 9 | 33 | 33 | 0 | 31 | 4 | 2 | 6 | 17 | 22 | −5 | 5 | 2 | 3 | 16 | 11 | +5 |

Last updated: 8 March 2012.
Source: Competitive Matches

==== Results by round ====
| Round | 1 | 2 | 3 | 4 | 5 | 6 | 7 | 8 | 9 | 10 | 11 | 12 | 13 | 14 | 15 | 16 | 17 | 18 | 19 | 20 | 21 | 22 | 23 | 24 | 25 | 26 |
|---|---|---|---|---|---|---|---|---|---|---|---|---|---|---|---|---|---|---|---|---|---|---|---|---|---|---|
| Ground | H | A | A | H | A | H | A | A | H | H | A | H | A | A | H | H | A | H | A | H | H | A | A | H | A | H |
| Result | W | L | D | L | W | L | W | D | W | L | W | L | L | W | L | D | W | D | L | W | L | | | | | |
| Position | 4 | 9 | 6 | 11 | 7 | 7 | 8 | 8 | 6 | 6 | 6 | 6 | 6 | 6 | 6 | 6 | 6 | 6 | 6 | 6 | 6 | | | | | |

Updated to match(es) played on 8 March 2012. Source: slstat.com
A = Away; H = Home; W = Win; D = Draw; L = Loss

==== Matches ====
Kickoff times are in AST (UTC+3).

Win Draw Loss Postponed

| 10 September 2011 Round 1 | Al Nassr | 1 - 0 | Al Raed | King Fahd International Stadium, Riyadh |
| 20:30 AST | K. Zylaeei 23'; Mercier (yellow card) 56' | (Report); Live TV: Arriyadiah 2 | | Attendance: 5550; Referee: Meree Al-Awagi; Assistant referees: - 1st Assistant: Nassir Al-Mudhaffr; 2nd Assistant: Fahad Al-Amri; Fourth official: Bader Al-Anazi |

| 16 September 2011 Round 2 | Al Ahli | 2 - 0 | Al Nassr | Prince Abdullah al-Faisal Stadium, Jeddah |
| 20:25 AST | Simoes 26' (pen.), 34' (pen.); Waleed (red card) 90+2' | (Report); Live TV: Arriyadiah 1 | Omar (yellow card) 25'; Saad (yellow card) 33'; Mercier (yellow card) 71'; M. Eid (yellow card) 88' | Attendance: 15492; Referee: Abdulrahman Al-Amri; Assistant referees: - 1st Assistant: Bader Al-Shamrani; 2nd Assistant: Majed Al-Nasser; Fourth official: Abdelrahman Al-Malki |

| 22 September 2011 Round 3 | Al Faisaly | 1 - 1 | Al Nassr | Prince Salman Bin Abdulaziz Sport City Stadium, Al Majma'ah |
| 20:20 AST | Al Kharashi 69'; Al Sahbi (yellow card) 71' | (Report); Live TV: Arriyadiah 2 | Al Sahlawi 20'; A. Fallatah (yellow card) 67'; Pino (yellow card) 76'; Yahia (yellow card) 84' | Attendance: 2725; Referee: Khalil Al-Ghamdi; Assistant referees: - 1st Assistant: Yahya Al-Meteq; 2nd Assistant: Khalaf Al-Shamari; Fourth official: Khaled Salwi |

| 30 September 2011 Round 4 | Al Nassr | 1 - 2 | Al Fateh | King Fahd International Stadium, Riyadh |
| 20:10 AST | Al Sahlawi 35'; R. Belal (yellow card) 84' | (Report); Live TV: Arriyadiah 1 | Rabeaa Sefiani (red card) 40'; Elton 48'; Ahmad Boabeed 86' | Attendance: 2119; Referee: Fahad Al-Mirdasi; Assistant referees: - 1st Assistant: Abdulaziz Al-Asmari; 2nd Assistant: Mohammed Al-Abkari; Fourth official: Metref Al-Qahtani |

| 15 October 2011 Round 5 | Hajer | 0 - 3 | Al Nassr | Prince Abdullah bin Jalawi Stadium, Al-Ahsa |
| 19:55 AST | Haider Amer (yellow card) 42'; Khalid Al-Rujaib (yellow card) 44'; Hussein Shuwaish (yellow card) 56' | (Report); Live TV: Arriyadiah 3 | Pino 45+3'; Adnan (yellow card) 51'; Mercier (yellow card) 51'; Malek 57', 80' | Attendance: 3683; Referee: Saleh Al-Hathlool; Assistant referees: - 1st Assistant: Abdullah Al-Shlwi; 2nd Assistant: Abdelraheem Al-Shamari; Fourth official: Mohammed Al-Hoaish |

| 21 October 2011 Round 6 | Al Nassr | 1 - 3 | Al Ettifaq | Prince Faisal bin Fahd Stadium, Riyadh |
| 19:50 AST | Pino 2'; Ibra (yellow card) 49' | (Report); Live TV: Arriyadiah 1 | Lazaroni (yellow card) 30'; Tagliabué 32'; Seaaf Al-Bushi (yellow card) 36'; Al Salem 45'; Al Sulim 90+3' | Attendance: 5218; Referee: Fahad Al-Mirdasi; Assistant referees: - 1st Assistant: Moaid Al-Sayeg; 2nd Assistant: Fahad Al-Amri; Fourth official: Yahya Al-Qarni |

| 26 October 2011 Round 7 | Al Ansar | 0 - 2 | Al Nassr | Prince Mohammed bin Abdul Aziz Stadium, Medina |
| 19:50 AST | Ayman Rajeh (yellow card) 90'; Al Fallatti (yellow card) 90+1'; Waleed Mahboob (yellow card) 90+1' | Summary | Omar Hawsawi 23'; Mohammad Al Sahlawi 77' | Attendance: 8,190; Referee: Abdulaziz Al-Funaitel; Assistant referees: - 1st Assistant: Bader Al-Shamrani; 2nd Assistant: Waleed Al-Boaimi; Fourth official: Khaled Al-Sinany |

| 1 November 2011 Round 8 | Al Shabab | 2 - 2 | Al Nassr | Prince Faisal bin Fahd Stadium, Riyadh |
| 19:45 AST | Tavares 23'; Al Shamrani (yellow card) 34'; Ahmed Otaif 56'; Tavares (yellow card) 78'; Waleed Jahdali (yellow card) 87' | (Report); Live TV: Arriyadiah 1 | R. Belal 49'; A. Abbas (yellow card) 53'; M. Eid (yellow card) 55'; A. Abbas 57'; Ibra (yellow card) 66'; Mercier (yellow card) 90' | Attendance: 4357; Referee: Khalil Al-Ghamdi; Assistant referees: - 1st Assistant: Nassir Al-Mudhaffr; 2nd Assistant: Majed Al-Nasser; Fourth official: Abdulaziz Al-Funaitel |

| 19 November 2011 Round 9 | Al Nassr | 3 - 2 | Najran | King Fahd International Stadium, Riyadh |
| 19:35 AST | Omar Hawsawi 51'; Pino 76' (pen.); Pino 90+3' | (Report); Live TV: Arriyadiah 2 | Đokić 42'; Awdh Faraj 78' | Attendance: 1576; Referee: Abdulrahman Al-Amri; Assistant referees: - 1st Assistant: Yahya Al-Meteq; 2nd Assistant: Khalaf Al-Shamari; Fourth official: Yahya Al-Qarni |

| 24 November 2011 Round 10 | Al Nassr | 0 - 3 | Al Hilal | King Fahd International Stadium, Riyadh |
| 19:35 AST | Abdulaziz Falath (yellow card) 12'; Adnan Falatah (yellow card) 28'; Al Ghamdi (yellow card) 50'; Omar Hawsawi (yellow card) 56'; Mercier (yellow card) 76'; Pino (red card) 79' | Summary | Al Marshadi (yellow card) 4'; Al Shalhoub 10', 29' (pen.); Hermach (yellow card) 32'; Al Fraidi (yellow card) 55'; Al Dawsari 84' | Attendance: 17,945; Referee: Khalil Al-Ghamdi |

| 1 December 2011 Round 11 | Al Taawon | 1-2 | Al Nassr | King Abdullah Sport City Stadium, Buraidah |
| 15:15 AST | Al Khaybari (yellow card) 56'; Memelli 77' | Summary | Malek Mouath 20'; Mohamed Eid (yellow card) 60'; Ibrahim Ghaleb (yellow card) 79'; Al Zealaiy 81'; Omar Hawsawi (yellow card) 90+1' | Attendance: 7,630; Referee: Sami Al-Nemri |

| 8 December 2011 Round 12 | Al Nassr | 1-3 | Al Ittihad | King Fahd International Stadium, Riyadh |
| 15:05 AST | Al Sahlawi 64'; Abdoh Bernaoy (yellow card) 88' | Summary | Redha Tukar 7'; Mohamed Abosaban (yellow card) 27'; Naif Hazazi 28'; Al Numare 59'; Redha Tukar (yellow card) 61'; Saud Khariri (yellow card) 87'; Al Saeed (yellow card) 90+6' | Attendance: 4,794; Referee: Meree Al-Awagi |

| 16 December 2011 Round 13 | Al Qadisiyah | 2-1 | Al Nassr | Prince Saud bin Jalawi Stadium, Khobar |
| 19:35 AST | Abdulwahab Ali (yellow card) 5'; Tiero 9'; Al Shmaly (yellow card) 42'; Al Shmaly 73'; Majed Aseri (yellow card) 77' | Summary | Mohamed Eid (yellow card) 59'; Al Sahlawi 71' | Attendance: 3,253; Referee: Abdulrahman Al-Amri |

| 25 December 2011 Round 7 | Al Ansar | 0 - 2 | Al Nassr | Prince Mohammed bin Abdul Aziz Stadium, Medina |
| 19:45 AST | Ayman Rajeh (yellow card) 90'; Al Fallatti (yellow card) 90+1'; Waleed Mahboob (yellow card) 90+1' | Summary | Omar Hawsawi 23'; Mohammad Al Sahlawi 77' | Attendance: 8,190; Referee: Abdulaziz Al-Funaitel |

| 30 December 2011 Round 14 | Al Raed | 1-4 | Al Nassr | King Abdullah Sport City Stadium, Buraidah |
| 15:15 AST | Al Gizani 59'; Diba (yellow card) 90+2' | Sumaary | Yahia 2'; Pino 39'; Al Sahlawi 40', 50'; Al Zealaiy (yellow card) 90' | Attendance: 8,420; Referee: Abdulrahman Al-Amri |

| 5 January 2012 Round 15 | Al Nassr | 1-3 | Al Ahli | King Fahd International Stadium, Riyadh |
| 15:20 AST | Ibrahim Ghaleb (yellow card) 6'; Al Sahlawi 22' | Summary | Al Hosni 13'; Al Musa (yellow card) 27'; Al Jassim (yellow card) 36'; Marcelo Camacho 79'; Al Jassim 90+2' | Attendance: 7,450; Referee: Fahad Al-Mirdasi |

| 12 January 2012 Round 16 | Al Nassr | 1-1 | Al Faisaly | King Fahd International Stadium, Riyadh |
| 15:25 AST | Al Ghamdi (yellow card) 15'; Al Qahtani (yellow card) 25'; Rayan Belal 88' | Summary | Al Sahbi 63'; Wael Ayan (yellow card) 86' | Attendance: 1,670; Referee: Sami Al-Nemri |

| 18 January 2012 Round 17 | Al Fateh | 0-1 | Al Nassr | Prince Abdullah bin Jalawi Stadium, Al-Hasa |
| 20:00 AST | | Summary | Al Sahlawi 34' | Attendance: 3,839; Referee: Abdulaziz Al-Funaitel |

| 1 February 2012 Round 18 | Al Nassr | 0-0 | Hajer | King Fahd International Stadium, Riyadh |
| 20:10 AST | Khaled Aziz (yellow card) 59' | Summary | Hazem Jawdat (yellow card) 21' (yellow-red card) 41'; Al Rejaib (yellow card) 22'; Abdullah Buhumail (yellow card) 26'; Rico (yellow card) 90+3' | Attendance: 1,417; Referee: Abdulaziz Al-Funaitel |

| 6 February 2012 Round 19 | Al Ettifaq | 2-0 | Al Nassr | Prince Mohamed bin Fahd Stadium, Dammam |
| 20:15 AST | Al Hamad 8', 24' (pen.); Carlos (yellow card) 18'; Al Hamad (yellow card) 30'; Al Bargan (yellow card) 42'; Al Dosari (yellow card) 80' | Summary | Eid (yellow card) 57' | Attendance: 4,649; Referee: Abdulrahman Al Amri |

| 14 February 2012 Round 20 | Al Nassr | 4-1 | Al Ansar | King Fahd International Stadium, Riyadh |
| 20:20 AST | Suk 26'; Al Sahlawi 56', 78'; Suk (red card) 57'; Bouguèche 66' | Summary | Al Assiri 9' | Attendance: 1,089; Referee: Abdelrahman Al Malki |

| 8 March 2012 Round 21 | Al Nassr | 1-2 | Al Shabab | King Fahd International Stadium, Riyadh |
| 20:25 AST | Al Sahlawi 44'; Al Zealaiy (yellow card) 53'; Al Saran (yellow card) 81'; Falatah (yellow card) 90+5' | Summary | Al Shamrani 59' 75' (pen.); Ateef (yellow card) 90+1' | Attendance: 3,638; Referee: Abdulrahman Al Amri |

| 15 March 2012 Round 22 | Najran | 2-1 | Al Nassr | Al Akhdoud Club Stadium, Najran |
| 20:25 AST | Awadh Faraj 24'; Awadh Faraj (yellow card) 59'; Benhadj 76' | Summary | Talal Al-Asiri (yellow card) 10'; Bernaoy (yellow card) 18'; Bouguèche 26' | Attendance: 1200; Referee: Meree Al-Awagi |

| 25 March 2012 Round 23 | Al Hilal | v | Al Nassr | King Fahd International Stadium, Riyadh |
| 20:30 AST |

| 31 March 2012 Round 24 | Al Nassr | v | Al Taawon | King Fahd International Stadium, Riyadh |
| 20:30 AST |

| 8 April 2012 Round 25 | Al Ittihad | v | Al Nassr | Prince Abdullah al-Faisal Stadium, Jeddah |
| 20:35 AST |

| 14 April 2012 Round 26 | Al Nassr | v | Al Qadisiyah | King Fahd International Stadium, Riyadh |
| 20:35 AST |

=== 2011-12 Saudi Crown Prince Cup ===
==== Matches ====
| 20 December 2011 Last 16 | Al Fateh | 0–0 (7-8 p) | Al Nassr | Al-Hasa |
| 16:40 | Al Mogahwi (yellow card) 110' | Summary | Ghaleb (yellow card) 95' | Stadium: Prince Abdullah bin Jalawi Stadium; Referee: Metref Al Qahtani |

| 23 January 2012 Quarter-final | Al Hilal | 4–1 | Al Nassr | Riyadh |
| 17:00 | Byung-Soo 4' 50'; Al Shalhoub 22' (pen.); Al Dawsari 23' (yellow card) 71'; Al Ghannam (yellow card) 81' (yellow-red card) 88' | Summary | Radhi (yellow card) 21'; Al Zealaiy (yellow card) 37'; Al Sahlawi 60' (yellow card) 61'; Hawsawi (yellow card) 87'; Abbas (yellow card) 89' | Stadium: Prince Faisal bin Fahd Stadium; Referee: Anastasios Sidiropoulos |

=== 2012 King Cup of Champions ===
==== Matches ====
===== Quarter-finals =====
| 23 April 2012 First Leg | Al Shabab | 1 - 2 | Al Nassr | King Fahd International Stadium, Riyadh |
| 22:50 AST | Menegazzo 18' | | 40' Hamood; 45' (pen.) Bouguèche |

| 29 April 2012 Second Leg | Al Nassr | 2 - 1 | Al Shabab | King Fahd International Stadium, Riyadh |
| 22:50 AST | Al-Sahlawi 59'; Reche 74' | | 72' Al-Shamrani |

===== Semi-finals =====
| 8 May 2012 First Leg | Al Nassr | 2 - 0 | Al Fateh | King Fahd International Stadium, Riyadh |
| 22:50 AST | Bouguèche 73'; Reche 84' (pen.) |

| 14 May 2012 Second Leg | Al Fateh | 1 - 0 | Al Nassr |
| 22:50 AST | Salumu 24' |

===== Finals =====
| 18 May 2012 | Al-Ahli | 4 – 1 | Al-Nassr | Prince Abdullah al-Faisal Stadium, Jeddah |
| 22:50 AST | Al-Hosni 35'; Jaizawi 46' 77'; Al-Mousa 74' | | 82' Reche |

== Olympic Team (U-23) Competitions ==
=== 2011-12 Saudi Federation Cup U-23 ===
==== Results summary ====
| Overall | | | | | | | | Home | | | | | | Away | | | | | |
| Pld | W | D | L | GF | GA | GD | Pts | W | D | L | GF | GA | GD | W | D | L | GF | GA | GD |
|---|---|---|---|---|---|---|---|---|---|---|---|---|---|---|---|---|---|---|---|
| 8 | 4 | 2 | 2 | 18 | 11 | +7 | 14 | 2 | 1 | 0 | 6 | 3 | +3 | 2 | 1 | 2 | 12 | 8 | +4 |

Last updated: 14 November.
Source: Competitive Matches

==== Results by round ====
| Round | 1 | 2 | 3 | 4 | 5 | 6 | 7 | 8 | 9 | 10 | 11 | 12 | 13 | 14 | 15 | 16 | 17 | 18 | 19 | 20 | 21 | 22 | 23 | 24 | 25 | 26 |
|---|---|---|---|---|---|---|---|---|---|---|---|---|---|---|---|---|---|---|---|---|---|---|---|---|---|---|
| Ground | A | H | A | H | A | H | A | H | A | A | H | A | H | H | A | H | A | H | A | H | A | H | H | A | H | A |
| Result | D | W | L | D | L | W | W | P | W | | | | | | | | | | | | | | | | | |
| Position | 6 | 6 | 6 | 7 | 8 | 7 | 5 | | 5 | | | | | | | | | | | | | | | | | |

Updated to match(es) played on 14 November. Source: spl.com.sa
A = Away; H = Home; W = Win; D = Draw; L = Loss; P = Postponed

==== Matches ====
Kickoff times are in AST (UTC+3).

Win Draw Loss Postponed

| 11 September 2011 Round 1 | Al Raed U-23 | 3 - 3 | Al Nassr U-23 | Buraidah |
| 16:15 | Abdulaziz Al-Adham 9', 88'; Mohammed Al-Dubaib 18' | | Abdulelah Al-Nassar 38' (pen.), 44'; Mus'ab Al-Otaibi 46' |

| 24 September 2011 Round 2 | Al Nassr U-23 | 2 - 1 | Al Taawon U-23 | Riyadh |
| 15:50 | Ahmed Al-Jaizani 16'; Mana'a Al-Enezi 53' | | Abdullah Al-Salman 86' |

| 28 September 2011 Round 3 | Al Ahli U-23 | 4 - 3 | Al Nassr U-23 | Jeddah |
| 16:15 | 26'; 50'; (penalty missed) 65'; 67'; 74' | | Mus'ab Al-Otaibi 42'; 70' |

| 3 October 2011 Round 4 | Al Nassr U-23 | 0 - 0 | Al Shabab U-23 | Riyadh |
| 15:40 |

| 8 October 2011 Round 5 | Al Ittihad U-23 | 1 - 0 | Al Nassr U-23 | Jeddah |
| 16:00 |

| 13 October 2011 Round 6 | Al Nassr U-23 | 4 - 2 | Hajer U-23 | Riyadh |
| 15:30 |

| 18 October 2011 Round 7 | Najran U-23 | 0 - 4 | Al Nassr U-23 | Najran |
| 15:40 |

| 23 October 2011 Round 8 | Al Nassr U-23 | v | Al Fateh U-23 | Riyadh |
| 15:20 |

| 30 October 2011 Round 9 | Al Faisaly U-23 | 0 - 2 | Al Nassr U-23 | Harmah |
| 15:20 |

| 14 November 2011 Round 10 | Al Hilal U-23 | v | Al Nassr U-23 | Riyadh |
| 15:10 | | | | Stadium: Prince Faisal bin Fahd Stadium |

| 29 November 2011 Round 11 | Al Nassr U-23 | v | Al Ettifaq U-23 | Riyadh |
| 15:05 |

| 4 December 2011 Round 12 | Al Ansar U-23 | v | Al Nassr U-23 | Medina |
| 15:35 |

| 10 December 2011 Round 13 | Al Nassr U-23 | v | Al Qadisiyah U-23 | Riyadh |
| 15:05 |

| 14 December 2011 Round 14 | Al Nassr U-23 | v | Al Raed U-23 | Riyadh |
| 15:10 |

| 19 December 2011 Round 15 | Al Taawon U-23 | v | Al Nassr U-23 | Buraidah |
| 15:15 |

| 25 December 2011 Round 16 | Al Nassr U-23 | v | Al Ahli U-23 | Riyadh |
| 15:15 |

| 2 January 2012 Round 17 | Al Shabab U-23 | v | Al Nassr U-23 | Riyadh |
| 15:20 |

| 21 January 2012 Round 18 | Al Nassr U-23 | v | Al Ittihad U-23 | Riyadh |
| 15:35 |

| 26 January 2012 Round 19 | Hajer U-23 | v | Al Nassr U-23 | Al-Ahsa |
| 15:15 |

| 9 February 2012 Round 20 | Al Nassr U-23 | v | Najran U-23 | Riyadh |
| 15:45 |

| 24 February 2012 Round 21 | Al Fateh U-23 | v | Al Nassr U-23 | Al-Hasa |
| 15:40 |

| 28 February 2012 Round 22 | Al Nassr U-23 | v | Al Faisaly U-23 | Riyadh |
| 16:00 |

| 4 March 2012 Round 23 | Al Nassr U-23 | v | Al Hilal U-23 | Riyadh |
| 16:00 | | | | Stadium: Prince Faisal bin Fahd Stadium |

| 17 March 2012 Round 24 | Al Ettifaq U-23 | v | Al Nassr U-23 | Dammam |
| 15:50 |

| 24 March 2012 Round 25 | Al Nassr U-23 | v | Al Ansar U-23 | Riyadh |
| 20:35 |

| 2 April 2012 Round 26 | Al Qadisiyah U-23 | v | Al Nassr U-23 | Khobar |
| 20:35 |

== Youth Team (U-20) Competitions ==
=== 2011-12 Youth League U-20 ===
==== Results summary ====
| Overall | | | | | | | | Home | | | | | | Away | | | | | |
| Pld | W | D | L | GF | GA | GD | Pts | W | D | L | GF | GA | GD | W | D | L | GF | GA | GD |
|---|---|---|---|---|---|---|---|---|---|---|---|---|---|---|---|---|---|---|---|
| 0 | 0 | 0 | 0 | 0 | 0 | 0 | 0 | 0 | 0 | 0 | 0 | 0 | 0 | 0 | 0 | 0 | 0 | 0 | 0 |

Last updated: 2 September.
Source: Competitive Matches

==== Results by round ====
To be added when available.

==== Matches ====
| 18 November 2011 Round 1 | Al Ettifaq U-20 | v | Al Nassr U-20 | Dammam |
| 14:50 | Tareq Al-Awad |

| 24 November 2011 Round 2 | Al Nassr U-20 | v | Al Fateh U-20 | Riyadh |
| 15:05 |

Saudi Arabia Youth League 2011/2012 on goalzz.com.

=== 2011-12 Saudi Federation Cup U-20 ===
==== Group stage ====
There are 3 groups. Teams who get first place in their group qualify automatically to the knockout stage along with the best second place.

Kickoff times are in AST (UTC+3). Win Draw Loss Postponed

| 16 September 2011 Round 1 | Al Nassr U-20 | 1 - 2 | Al Ettifaq U-20 | Riyadh |
| 16:00 | Tareq Al-Awad | | Mohammed Ibraheem 35'; Ayman Masrahi 53' |

| 23 September 2011 Round 2 | Al Ansar U-20 | 1 - 2 | Al Nassr U-20 | Medina |
| 16:15 |

| 30 September 2011 Round 3 | Al Ahli U-20 | 1 - 2 | Al Nassr U-20 | Jeddah |
| 16:10 |

| 6 October 2011 Round 4 | Al Ettifaq U-20 | 0 - 1 | Al Nassr U-20 | Dammam |
| 15:20 |

| 14 October 2011 Round 5 | Al Nassr U-20 | 3 - 1 | Al Ansar U-20 | Riyadh |
| 15:30 |

| 20 October 2011 Round 6 | Al Nassr U-20 | 1 - 1 | Al Ahli U-20 | Riyadh |
| 15:15 |

| Pos | Team | Pld | W | D | L | GF | GA | GD | Pts |
|---|---|---|---|---|---|---|---|---|---|
| 1 | Al Ahli U-20 | 6 | 4 | 1 | 1 | 15 | 6 | +9 | 13 |
| 2 | Al Nassr U-20 | 6 | 4 | 1 | 1 | 10 | 6 | +4 | 13 |
| 3 | Al Ettifaq U-20 | 6 | 2 | 0 | 3 | 6 | 10 | −4 | 6 |
| 4 | Al Ansar U-20 | 6 | 0 | 0 | 5 | 6 | 15 | −9 | 0 |

From this group, Only Al Ahli qualified to the knockout stage. Al Qadisiyah and Al Ittihad qualified as the top of their groups. Hottain came as the best second place with 13 point and a +5 goal difference.
Group stage on goalzz.com.

== Youngster Team (U-17) Competitions ==
=== 2011-12 Youngster League U-17 ===
==== Results summary ====
| Overall | | | | | | | | Home | | | | | | Away | | | | | |
| Pld | W | D | L | GF | GA | GD | Pts | W | D | L | GF | GA | GD | W | D | L | GF | GA | GD |
|---|---|---|---|---|---|---|---|---|---|---|---|---|---|---|---|---|---|---|---|
| 0 | 0 | 0 | 0 | 0 | 0 | 0 | 0 | 0 | 0 | 0 | 0 | 0 | 0 | 0 | 0 | 0 | 0 | 0 | 0 |

Last updated: 2 September.
Source: Competitive Matches

==== Results by round ====
To be added when available.

==== Matches ====
Kickoff times are in AST (UTC+3). Win Draw Loss Postponed

| 17 November 2011 Round 1 | Al Nassr U-17 | v | Al Qadisiyah U-17 | Riyadh |
| 15:05 |

| 23 November 2011 Round 2 | Al Najma U-17 | v | Al Nassr U-17 | Unaizah |
| 15:15 |

Saudi U-17 Premier League 2011/2012 on goalzz.com.

=== 2011-12 Saudi Federation Cup U-17 ===
==== Group stage ====
There are 3 groups. Teams who get first place in their group qualify automatically to the knockout stage along with the best second place.

Kickoff times are in AST (UTC+3). Win Draw Loss Postponed

| 15 September 2011 Round 1 | Al Qadisiyah U-17 | 0 - 0 | Al Nassr U-17 | Khobar |
| 15:50 |

| 22 September 2011 Round 2 | Al Nassr U-17 | 2 - 0 | Al Ettifaq U-17 | Riyadh |
| 16:00 | Abdullah Sufiani; Mohammad Aldosari |

| 29 September 2011 Round 3 | Al Ta'ee U-17 | 0 - 2 | Al Nassr U-17 | Ha'il |
| 16:10 |

| 5 October 2011 Round 4 | Al Nassr U-17 | 2 - 2 | Al Qadisiyah U-17 | Riyadh |
| 15:45 |

| 12 October 2011 Round 5 | Al Ettifaq U-17 | 1 - 3 | Al Nassr U-17 | Dammam |
| 15:25 |

| 19 October 2011 Round 6 | Al Nassr U-17 | 3 - 0 | Al Ta'ee U-17 | Riyadh |
| 15:20 |

| Pos | Team | Pld | W | D | L | GF | GA | GD | Pts |
|---|---|---|---|---|---|---|---|---|---|
| 1 | Al Nassr U-17 | 6 | 4 | 2 | 0 | 12 | 3 | +9 | 14 |
| 2 | Al Qadisiyah U-17 | 6 | 2 | 3 | 1 | 8 | 6 | +2 | 9 |
| 3 | Al Ta'ee U-17 | 6 | 2 | 0 | 4 | 5 | 10 | −5 | 6 |
| 4 | Al Ettifaq U-17 | 6 | 1 | 1 | 4 | 5 | 11 | −6 | 4 |

From this group, Only Al Nassr qualified to the knockout stage. Al Hilal and Al Ittihad qualified as the top of their groups. Al Ahli came as the best second place with 11 point.
Group stage on goalzz.com.

==== Knockout stage ====
===== Semi-finals =====
| 24 October 2011 Semi-finals | Al Nassr U-17 | v | Al Ittihad U-17 | Riyadh |
| 15:30 |

| 29 October 2011 Semi-finals | Al Nassr U-17 | 2 - 1 | Al Ittihad U-17 | Riyadh |
| 15:30 |

Semi-finals round on goalzz.com.

===== Final =====
| 22 November 2011 Final | Al Hilal U-17 | 1 - 0 | Al Nassr U-17 | Riyadh |
| 17:45 |

Final round on goalzz.com.
