= Omar Hawsawi =

Saudi Arabian footballer (born 1985)

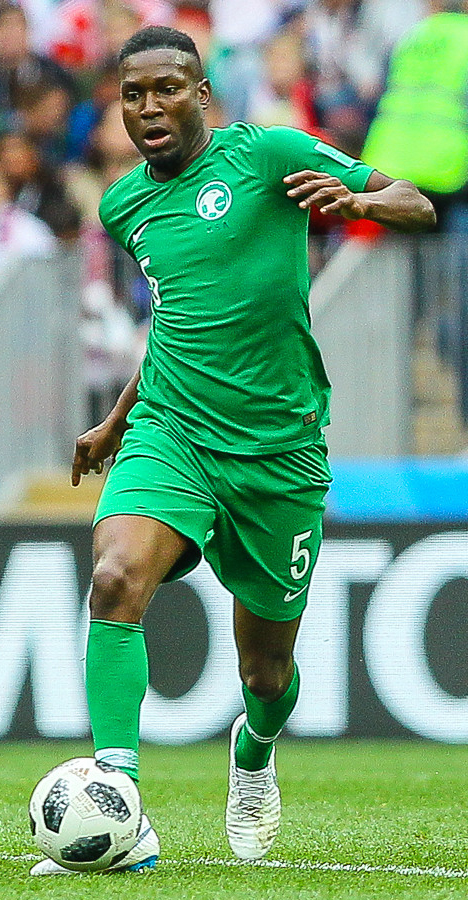
- Hawsawi with Saudi Arabia at the 2018 FIFA World Cup

Personal information
- Full name: Omar Ibrahim Omar; Othman Hawsawi
- Date of birth: 27 September 1985 (age 41)
- Place of birth: Mecca, Saudi Arabia
- Height: 1.84 m (6 ft 0 in)
- Position: Defender

Youth career
- Al-Shabab

Senior career*
Years	Team	Apps	(Gls)
2008–2009	Al-Washm		
2009–2011	Al-Shoulla	28	(3)
2011–2020	Al-Nassr	170	(11)
2020–2024	Al-Ittihad	65	(1)
Total		263	(15)

International career^{‡}
2013–2019	Saudi Arabia	53	(3)
- * Club domestic league appearances and goals as of 27 May 2024 ‡ National team caps and goals as of 10 September 2019

Omar Ibrahim Omar Othman Hawsawi (Arabic: عمر إبراهيم عمر عثمان هوساوي; born on 27 September 1985) is a Saudi Arabian former professional footballer who played as a defender who last played for Al-Nassr and Al-Ittihad. He also represented the Saudi Arabia national team and earned 53 caps between 2013 and 2019. He also participated in the 2018 FIFA World Cup and the 2015 and 2019 editions of the AFC Asian Cup.

== Club career ==
=== Early career ===
Hawsawi used to be a part of Al-Shabab's youth setup though he was released before he could make his debut for the first team. After he was released by Al-Shabab, Hawsawi joined Al-Washm. He spent a year at Al-Washm before joining Al-Shoulla.

=== Al-Shoulla ===
His first match was against Al-Faisaly, but after one year he left. He played his last match against Al-Jeel.

=== Al-Nassr ===
On 13 October 2010, Hawsawi signed a pre-contract agreement with Al-Nassr and joined the club during the 2011 winter transfer window. He made his debut for the first team on 24 February 2011 during the 3–2 win over Al-Faisaly. In 2013−14 season, he made 22 league appearances as he helped Al-Nassr win the Saudi League and the Crown Prince Cup. On 15 January 2014, Hawsawi renewed his contract with Al-Nassr for 4 years. In 2014−15 season, he won the League again. On 4 April 2017, Al-Nassr Club announced that the medical tests of the defender Omar Hawsawi showed that he suffered a slight knee injury and needed rest and treatment for five days, after the match against Al-Hilal in the quarter-finals of The Custodian of the Two Holy Mosques Cup. On 28 January 2018, Hawsawi renewed his contract with Al-Nassr once again. In the 2018–19 season, Hawsawi captained Al-Nassr to their first league title in 4 years and their 8th league title overall.

=== Al-Ittihad ===
On 18 October 2020, Hawsawi joined Al-Ittihad on a one-year deal. On 9 July 2021, Hawsawi renewed his contract with Al-Ittihad. During the 2022–23 season, Hawsawi made 23 appearances in all competitions helping Al-Ittihad win their first league title since 2009 and first Saudi Super Cup title. On 31 May 2023, Hawsawi signed one-year extension with Al-Ittihad. On 3 May 2024, Hawsawi announced that he would be retiring at the end of the season.

== International career ==
In May 2018 he was named in Saudi Arabia's preliminary squad for the 2018 FIFA World Cup in Russia. On October 3, 2019, Omar Hawsawi announced through his official Twitter account that he would be retiring internationally. He was on the Saudi Arabia national team in 3 major tournaments, the 2015 and 2019 AFC Asian Cup and the 2018 FIFA World Cup.

== Career statistics ==
=== Club ===
As of match played 27 May 2024

Club	Season	League			King Cup		Crown Prince Cup		Asia		Other		Total	
Club	Season	Division	Apps	Goals	Apps	Goals	Apps	Goals	Apps	Goals	Apps	Goals	Apps	Goals
Al-Nassr	2010–11	Pro League	8	1	1	0	1	0	6 (Note: Appearances in AFC Champions League)	0	—		16	1
Al-Nassr	2011–12	Pro League	13	2	1	0	2	0	—		—		16	2
Al-Nassr	2012–13	Pro League	15	1	2	0	3	0	—		2 (Note: Appearances in Arab Club Champions Cup)	0	22	1
Al-Nassr	2013–14	Pro League	22	3	1	0	4	0	—		—		27	3
Al-Nassr	2014–15	Pro League	24	2	4	0	3	1	6	0	1 (Note: Appearance in Saudi Super Cup)	0	38	3
Al-Nassr	2015–16	Pro League	23	1	4	0	2	0	5	0	1	0	35	1
Al-Nassr	2016–17	Pro League	23	1	3	0	4	0	—		—		30	1
Al-Nassr	2017–18	Pro League	22	0	2	0	—		—		3	0	27	0
Al-Nassr	2018–19	Pro League	13	0	2	0	—		11	2	3	0	29	2
Al-Nassr	2019–20	Pro League	7	0	2	0	—		1	0	0	0	10	0
Al-Nassr	Total		170	11	22	0	19	1	29	2	10	0	250	14
Al-Ittihad	2020–21	Pro League	17	0	0	0	—		—		2	0	19	0
Al-Ittihad	2021–22	Pro League	16	1	1	0	—		—		1	0	18	1
Al-Ittihad	2022–23	Pro League	20	0	2	0	—		—		1	0	23	0
Al-Ittihad	2023–24	Pro League	12	0	0	0	—		4	0	1	0	17	0
Al-Ittihad	Total		65	1	3	0	—		4	0	5	0	77	1
Career total			235	12	25	0	19	1	33	2	15	0	327	15

=== International ===
Statistics accurate as of match played 10 September 2019.

Saudi Arabia
Year	Apps	Goals
2013	1	0
2014	11	1
2015	7	0
2016	8	1
2017	12	0
2018	12	1
2019	2	0
Total	53	3

International goals

Scores and results list Saudi Arabia's goal tally first.

#	Date	Venue	Opponent	Score	Result	Competition
1.	14 October 2014	King Abdullah Sports City, Jeddah	Lebanon	1–0	1–1	Friendly
2.	15 November 2016	Saitama Stadium 2002, Saitama	Japan	1–2	1–2	2018 FIFA World Cup qualification
3.	26 February 2018	King Abdullah Sports City, Jeddah	Moldova	1–0	3–0	Friendly

== Honours ==
Al-Nassr

- Saudi Pro League: 2013–14, 2014–15, 2018–19
- Crown Prince's Cup: 2013–14
- Saudi Super Cup: 2019

Al-Ittihad

- Saudi Pro League: 2022–23
- Saudi Super Cup: 2022
