= Fahad Al-Yami =

Saudi Arabian footballer

Personal information
- Full name: Fahad Al-Yami
- Date of birth: April 7, 1992 (age 34)
- Place of birth: Saudi Arabia
- Height: 1.84 m (6 ft 1/2 in)
- Position: Defender

Youth career
- ???–2009: Al-Kawkab
- 2009–2014: Al-Nassr

Senior career*
Years	Team	Apps	(Gls)
2010–2012	Al-Nassr	3	(0)
2014–2015	Al-Kawkab	??	(2)
2015–2016	Al-Fayha		
2016–2017	Al-Kawkab		
2017–2018	Al-Sharq		
2018–2020	Al-Sadd		
- * Club domestic league appearances and goals

Fahad Al-Yami (Arabic: فهد اليامي; born April 7, 1992) is a Saudi football player who plays as a defender.
