= Marwan Madu =

Saudi Arabian footballer (born 1991)

Personal information
- Full name: Marwan Mohammed Madu
- Date of birth: January 20, 1991 (age 35)
- Place of birth: Saudi Arabia
- Height: 1.87 m (6 ft 1 1/2 in)
- Position: Goalkeeper

Youth career
- -2007: Al-Mujazzal
- 2007-2013: Al Nassr

Senior career*
Years	Team	Apps	(Gls)
2013–2014	Al-Nassr	0	(0)
2013–2014	→ Al-Orobah (loan)	1	(0)
2015–2016	Al-Fayha		
2016–2017	Al-Shoulla		
2017–2022	Al-Bukayriyah		
2022	Al-Rawdhah		
2022–2023	Al-Najma		
2023–2024	Al-Houra		
2024–2025	Al-Entesar		
- * Club domestic league appearances and goals

Marwan Madu (Arabic: مروان مادو; born January 20, 1991) is a Saudi football player, a goalkeeper, who plays as a goalkeeper.
