= KSA Sport (channels) =

Saudi sports satellite TV network

- Country: Saudi Arabia
- Headquarters: Riyadh, Saudi Arabia

Programming
- Language: Arabic
- Picture format: (1080p MPEG-4 HDTV)

Ownership
- Owner: Saudi Broadcasting Authority

History
- Launched: 23 September 2002; 24 years ago

Links
- Website: www.riyadiyatv.com

Availability

Streaming media
- YouTube: Watch live (KSA only)

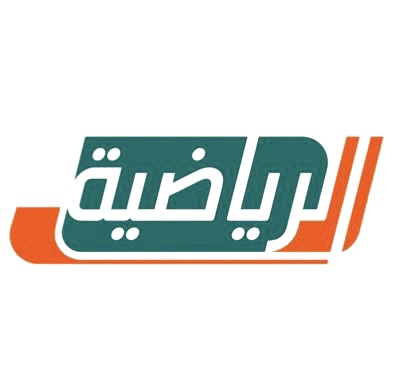
KSA Sports logo in Arabic

KSA Sport, also known as Al-Riyadiya, is a Saudi Arabian sports network and the oldest surviving sports broadcaster in the Kingdom. The network operates multiple channels under the KSA Sports name and covers a wide range of sporting events.

== Programming ==
=== Football & Sports ===
- Saudi First Division League
- King's Cup (Final Only)
- Saudi Basketball League
- Saudi Second Division League
- 2025 CONCACAF Gold Cup
- 2025 FIFA Arab Cup (Only Saudi Arabian team)
- 27th Arabian Gulf Cup
