= Shavkat Mullajanov =

Uzbekistani footballer

Personal information
- Full name: Shavkat Mullajanov
- Date of birth: 19 January 1986 (age 40)
- Place of birth: Zarafshon, Uzbek SSR, USSR
- Height: 1.80 m (5 ft 11 in)
- Position: Defender

Senior career*
Years	Team	Apps	(Gls)
2005–2007	Qizilqum Zarafshon		
2007–2008	Olmaliq FK		
2009	Pakhtakor		
2010	Qizilqum Zarafshon	1	(0)
2010	Olmaliq FK	25	(0)
2011–2012	Al-Ahli	30	(0)
2012–2013	Al Nassr	12	(0)
2013	Liaoning Whowin	20	(0)
2014	Olmaliq FK	13	(0)
2014–2015	Lokomotiv Tashkent	23	(0)
2016	Al-Shaab	7	(0)

International career^{‡}
2010–	Uzbekistan	39	(0)
- * Club domestic league appearances and goals as of 6 March 2016 ‡ National team caps and goals as of 9 October 2015

Shavkat Mullajanov (Uzbek: Шавкатжон Муллажонов; born 19 January 1986) is an Uzbek professional football player who currently plays for Uzbekistan national football team. His position is center back, but he can also play as a right back.

== Career ==
After his great performance at the 2011 AFC Asian Cup he left for Qatar, to play for Al-Ahli. He was also the first player on the Uzbekistan's team to transfer to another club after the Asian Cup. Over the span of two seasons with Al Ahli, he received 12 yellow cards and 2 red cards in 29 games.

On 5 July 2012, it was announced that Mullajanov would join Al Nasr SC in Saudi Arabia. Mullajanov transferred to Chinese Super League side Liaoning Whowin on 27 February 2013.

== Honours ==
=== Club ===
Lokomotiv

- Uzbek League runners-up (2): 2014, 2015
- Uzbek Cup (1): 2014
- Uzbekistan Super Cup (1): 2015
