= Zamil Al-Sulim =

Saudi Arabian footballer

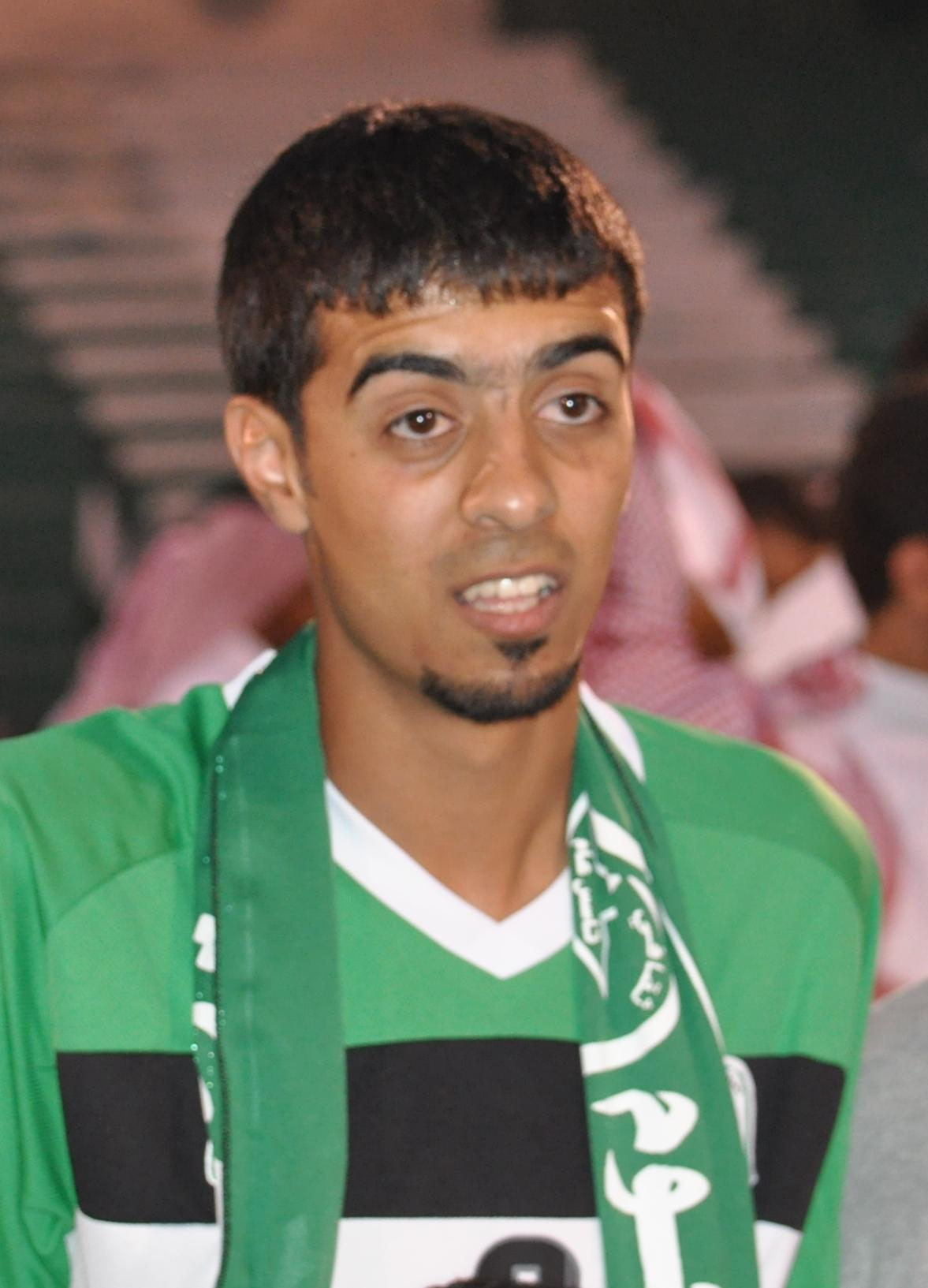

Personal information
- Full name: Zamil Mohammed Al-Sulim
- Date of birth: October 29, 1989 (age 37)
- Place of birth: Unaizah, Saudi Arabia
- Height: 1.77 m (5 ft 9 1/2 in)
- Position: Forward

Youth career
- 2005–2007: Al-Najma

Senior career*
Years	Team	Apps	(Gls)
2008–2011	Al-Najma	73	(35)
2011–2017	Ettifaq FC	51	(11)
2016	→ Al-Wehda (loan)	3	(0)
2016–2017	→ Al-Shoalah (loan)		
2017–2018	Al-Najma		
2021–2023	Al-Najma		
2023–2024	Al-Hilaliyah		

International career^{‡}
2012–	Saudi Arabia		
- * Club domestic league appearances and goals as of 19:59, 7 September 2014 (UTC) ‡ National team caps and goals as of 19:59, 7 September 2014 (UTC)

Zamil Al-Sulim (Arabic: زامل السليم) is a Saudi Arabian football player. He was born on 29 October 1989 in Unaizah in Saudi Arabia and plays in the position of striker. He played for Al-Najma as a striker.

In 2011, he moved from Al-Najma club to Ettifaq FC for a record 1.2 million SAR, approximately US$320,000.

== International goals ==
=== Under–23 ===
Scores and results list Saudi Arabia's goal tally first.

Goal	Date	Venue	Opponent	Score	Result	Competition
1	8 October 2010	Prince Mohamed bin Fahd Stadium, Dammam, Saudi Arabia	Bahrain	3–0	6–0	Friendly
2	8 October 2010	Prince Mohamed bin Fahd Stadium, Dammam, Saudi Arabia	Bahrain	4–0	6–0	Friendly

== Honours ==
=== Club ===
Al-Najma

- Saudi Second Division (1): 2009–10
