= Mutab Asiri =

Saudi Arabian football Goalkeeper

Personal information
- Full name: Mutab Zaid Asiri
- Date of birth: November 22, 1987 (age 38)
- Place of birth: Abha, Saudi Arabia
- Height: 1.83 m (6 ft 0 in)
- Position: Goalkeeper

Youth career
- Abha FC

Senior career*
Years	Team	Apps	(Gls)
2008–2012	Abha FC		
2012–2015	Al-Nassr		
2015	→ Hetten FC (loan)		
2015–2017	Al-Hazm		
2017–2019	Abha FC		
- * Club domestic league appearances and goals

Mutab Asiri (born 22 November 1987) is a Saudi Arabian footballer who plays as a goalkeeper. He joined Al-Nasr in the Winter of 2012, having left the Abha FC.

== Career ==
At the club level, Mutab Asiri played for Riyadh.

== Honours ==
=== Clubs ===
Al-Nassr

- Saudi Professional League 2013–14
- Saudi Crown Prince Cup: 2013–14
