= Saud Hamood =

Saudi Arabian footballer

Personal information
- Full name: Saud Hamood
- Date of birth: August 17, 1989 (age 37)
- Place of birth: Riyadh, Saudi Arabia
- Height: 1.80 m (5 ft 11 in)
- Position: Striker

Youth career
- 2005–2009: Al-Riyadh

Senior career*
Years	Team	Apps	(Gls)
2008–2009	Al-Riyadh		
2009–2015	Al-Nassr		
2015	→ Al-Shoulla (loan)		
2021–2022	Al-Mujazzal		

International career
2009	Saudi Arabia	1	(1)
- * Club domestic league appearances and goals

Saud Hamood Yahya Hasan (Arabic: سعود حمود يحيى حسن) is a Saudi Arabian footballer who played as a midfielder.

He joined Al-Nasr in the summer of 2009, having left the Al-Riyadh club of Riyadh.
