= Ahmad Abbas =

Saudi Arabian footballer (born 1984)

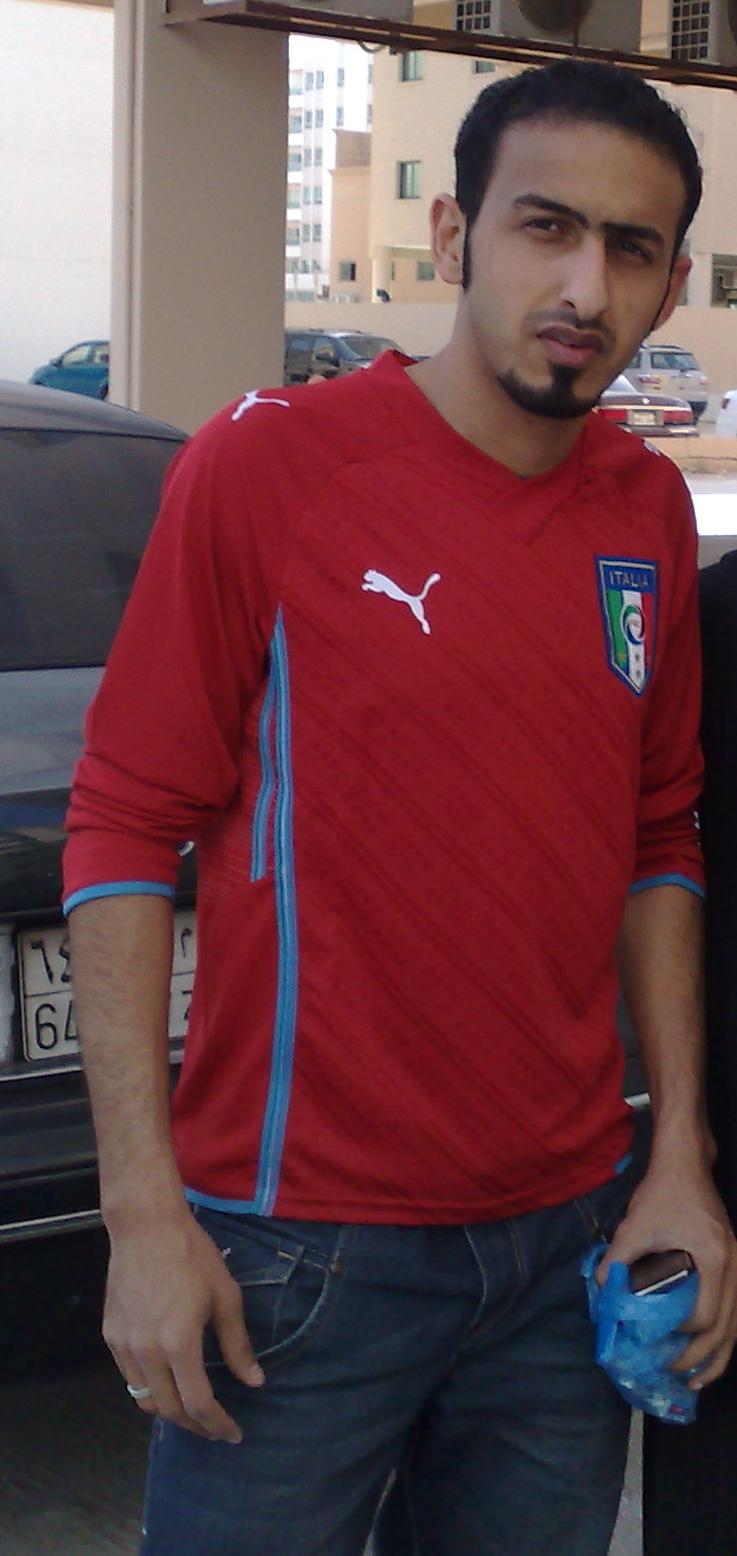

Personal information
- Full name: Ahmad Mohammed Isa Abbas
- Date of birth: 26 August 1984 (age 42)
- Place of birth: Jeddah, Saudi Arabia
- Height: 1.78 m (5 ft 10 in)
- Position: Midfielder

Senior career*
Years	Team	Apps	(Gls)
2005–2006	Al-Hilal	–	(–)
2006–2008	Al-Ta'ee	–	(–)
2008–2016	Al-Nassr	41	(4)
2015–2016	→ Najran SC (loan)	18	(0)
2016–2018	Al-Faisaly	17	(0)
2018	Al-Qaisumah		

International career
2010	Saudi Arabia	10	(1)
- * Club domestic league appearances and goals

Ahmad Abbas (Arabic: أحمد عباس; born 26 August 1984) is a Saudi Arabian professional footballer who plays as a midfielder.

== Club career ==
Abbas began his career with Saudi Professional League club Al-Hilal. He joined Al-Ta'ee in 2006 and spent two years there before moving to Al-Nassr in 2008. Abbas scored two goals in nine league appearances for Al-Nassr during the 2009–10 season.

== International career ==
Abbas made his debut for the Saudi Arabia national team in 2010. He scored his first own goal for his country at the 20th Arabian Gulf Cup in a 1–0 loss against United Arab Emirates on 2 December 2010.

=== International goals ===
#	Date	Venue	Opponent	Score	Result	Competition
1.	2 December 2010	May 22 Stadium, Aden, Yemen	United Arab Emirates	1–0	1–0	20th Arabian Gulf Cup
