= Abdullah Al-Enezi =

Saudi Arabian footballer

Personal information
- Full name: Abdullah Mutlaq Al-Dahmashi Al-Enezi
- Date of birth: September 20, 1990 (age 36)
- Place of birth: Arar, Saudi Arabia
- Height: 1.82 m (5 ft 11 1/2 in)
- Position: Goalkeeper

Youth career
- 2003–2005: Arar
- 2005–2009: Al-Nassr

Senior career*
Years	Team	Apps	(Gls)
2009–2019	Al-Nassr	118	(0)

International career^{‡}
2011	Saudi Arabia	3	(0)
- * Club domestic league appearances and goals as of 00:00, December 22, 2016 (UTC) ‡ National team caps and goals as of 00:00, December 22, 2016 (UTC)

Abdullah Mutlaq Al-Dahmashi Al-Enezi (Arabic: عبد الله مطلق العنزي; born 2 May 1990) is a Saudi Arabian football goalkeeper.

== Career ==
At the club level, Abdullah Al-Enezi played for Arar FC.

He is also a member of the Saudi national football team.

== Honours ==
=== Club ===
Al-Nassr

- Saudi Pro League: 2013–14، 2014-2015
- Crown Prince's Cup: 2013–14
