= Ahmed Al-Hadrami =

Saudi Arabian footballer

Personal information
- Full name: Ahmed Al-Hadrami
- Date of birth: 24 October 1987 (age 38)
- Place of birth: ?, Saudi Arabia
- Height: 1.79 m (5 ft 10 in)
- Position: Winger

Senior career*
Years	Team	Apps	(Gls)
?–2008	Hajer Club		
2008–2012	Al-Nassr		
2009–2011	Al-Fateh SC (Loan)		
2011–2013	Al-Raed		
2013–2014	Hajer Club		
2014–2015	Al Hazm		
2015–2016	Al-Ta'ee		
2016–2017	Al Jeel		

International career
- Saudi Arabia
- * Club domestic league appearances and goals

Ahmed Abdul Rahman Al-Hadrami is a Saudi Arabian football midfielder.

== Career ==
He started playing for the first team in the 2008-2009 season after joining from Al Hajer club.
