= Khaled Al-Zylaeei =

Saudi Arabian footballer (1987–2022)

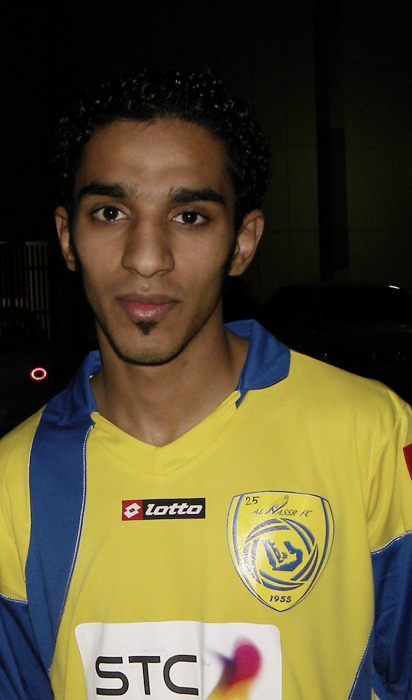

Personal information
- Full name: Khaled Mohammed Isa Al-Zylaeei
- Date of birth: 16 May 1987
- Place of birth: Abha, Saudi Arabia
- Date of death: 30 September 2022 (aged 35)
- Height: 1.74 m (5 ft 9 in)
- Position: Winger

Youth career
- Abha

Senior career*
Years	Team	Apps	(Gls)
2007–2009	Abha	29	(3)
2009–2016	Al-Nassr	82	(8)
2015–2016	→ Al-Taawoun (loan)	18	(3)
2016–2017	Al-Faisaly	3	(0)
2017	Al-Batin	3	(0)
2017–2018	Al-Raed	1	(0)
2018–2019	Abha	40	(6)
2020	Al-Ain	0	(0)
Total		176	(20)

International career
2010–2013	Saudi Arabia	8	(1)
- * Club domestic league appearances and goals

Khaled Mohammed Isa Al-Zylaeei (Arabic: خالد محمد عيسى الزيلعي; 16 May 1987 – 30 September 2022) was a Saudi Arabian association footballer who played as a winger. He joined Al-Nassr coming from Abha in the summer of 2009 to 2016 and achieved three titles with Al-Nassr. In June 2020, he was diagnosed with amyotrophic lateral sclerosis, and died in September 2022, at the age of 35.

== Honours ==
Al-Nassr

- Saudi Professional League: 2013–14, 2014–15
- Saudi Crown Prince Cup: 2013–14

Abha

- MS League: 2018–19
