= Abdulkareem Al-Khaibari =

Saudi Arabian footballer

Abdulakreem Al-Khaibari عبد الكريم الخيبري
Personal information
- Full name: Abdulakreem Abdullah Al-Khaibari
- Date of birth: 30 August 1988 (age 38)
- Place of birth: Saudi Arabia
- Height: 1.75 m (5 ft 9 in)
- Position: Left-back

Youth career
- Al-Qadsiah

Senior career*
Years	Team	Apps	(Gls)
2008–2010	Al-Qadsiah		
2010–2012	Al-Nassr		
2011–2012	→ Al-Qadsiah (loan)		
2012–2013	Al-Nahda		
2013–2016	Sdoos		
2016–2018	Al-Thoqbah		
2018–2019	Arar		
2021–2022	Mudhar		

International career
- Saudi Arabia U23
- * Club domestic league appearances and goals as of 29 July 2020

Abdulakreem Al-Khaibari (Arabic: عبد الكريم الخيبري; born 30 August 1988) is a Saudi Arabian footballer who plays as a left back.

== Career ==
He formerly played for Al-Qadsiah, Al-Nassr, again Al-Qadsiah, Al-Nahda, Sdoos, Al-Thoqbah, Arar, and Mudhar.
