= Mohamed Eid =

Saudi Arabian footballer

Personal information
- Full name: Mohamed Eid Naser Al-Bishi
- Date of birth: 3 May 1987 (age 39)
- Place of birth: Jeddah, Saudi Arabia
- Height: 1.83 m (6 ft 0 in)
- Position: Defender

Youth career
- ???–2004: Baish
- 2004–2006: Al-Ahli

Senior career*
Years	Team	Apps	(Gls)
2006–2009	Al-Ahli	40	(0)
2009–2017	Al-Nassr	90	(3)
2017–2018	Al-Faisaly		

International career^{‡}
2006–2015	Saudi Arabia	11	(0)
- * Club domestic league appearances and goals as of 26 December 2016 ‡ National team caps and goals as of 26 December 2016

Mohamed Eid Naser Al-Bishi (Arabic: محمد عيد ناصر البيشي; born 3 May 1987) is a Saudi Arabian former football defender.

He was a member of the national team, and was called up to the 2006 FIFA World Cup after Mohammed Al-Anbar was injured in a training session.
