= Abdulaziz Fallatah =

Saudi football player

Personal information
- Full name: Abdulaziz Kamel Fallatah
- Date of birth: December 28, 1985 (age 40)
- Place of birth: Saudi Arabia
- Height: 1.79 m (5 ft 10 in)
- Position: Midfielder

Youth career
- Al-Wehda

Senior career*
Years	Team	Apps	(Gls)
2006–2009	Al-Wehda		
2009–2010	Al-Faisaly		
2010–2011	Al-Qadisiyah	25	(0)
2011–2012	Al-Nassr FC	13	(0)
2012–2013	Al-Taawon	2	(0)
2013–2014	Al-Orobah	24	(3)
2014–2016	Al-Wehda	6	(0)
2016	Al-Orobah		
2016–2017	Hajer	12	(0)
2018	Jeddah		
2020–2021	Bisha		
- * Club domestic league appearances and goals

Abdulaziz Fallatah (Arabic: عبد العزيز فلاته; born December 28, 1985) is a Saudi football player who plays as a midfielder.
