= Abdulellah Al-Nassar =

Saudi Arabian footballer

Personal information
- Full name: Abdulellah Al-Nassar
- Date of birth: July 6, 1991 (age 35)
- Place of birth: Riyadh, Saudi Arabia
- Height: 1.72 m (5 ft 8 in)
- Position: Winger

Youth career
- ???–2011: Al-Nassr

Senior career*
Years	Team	Apps	(Gls)
2011–2018	Al-Nassr	2	(0)
2013–2015	→ Al-Orobah F.C. (loan)	22	(1)
2015–2016	→ Al-Shoulla F.C. (loan)		
2019	Al-Bukayriyah		
2019–2020	Al-Washm		

International career
2011–	Saudi Arabia U20		
- * Club domestic league appearances and goals

Abdulellah Al-Nassar (Arabic:عبد الإله النصار) is a Saudi footballer who plays as a winger.
