= Abdulaziz Al-Aazmi =

Saudi Arabian footballer (born 1991)

Personal information
- Full name: Abdulaziz Al-Aazmi
- Date of birth: 6 February 1991 (age 35)
- Place of birth: Saudi Arabia
- Height: 1.77 m (5 ft 10 in)
- Position: Midfielder

Senior career*
Years	Team	Apps	(Gls)
???–2010	Al-Najma		
2010–2012	Al Nassr FC	1	(0)
2012–2013	Al-Hilal F.C	0	(0)
2013	Najran SC	0	(0)

International career
2011	Saudi Arabia U20	4	(0)
- * Club domestic league appearances and goals as of 6 April 2013

Abdulaziz Al-Aazmi (born 6 February 1991) is a Saudi Arabian footballer who plays as a midfielder for Saudi Professional League team Al-Hilal F.C.
