= Talal Assiri =

Saudi Arabian footballer

Personal information
- Date of birth: May 2, 1987 (age 39)
- Place of birth: Saudi Arabia
- Height: 1.66 m (5 ft 5 1/2 in)
- Position: Defender

Senior career*
Years	Team	Apps	(Gls)
2005–2011	Al-Ittihad	25	(2)
2011	Najran	15	(0)
2011–2013	Al-Nassr		
2015–2016	Al Jabalain		

International career^{‡}
2008–	Saudi Arabia	4	(0)
- * Club domestic league appearances and goals as of 00:00, March 16, 2012 (UTC) ‡ National team caps and goals as of 11/12/2011

Talal Assiri (born 2 May 1987) is a Saudi Arabian international football defender.

== Career ==
At the club level, Assiri played for Al-Ittihad.

He is also a member of the Saudi national football team.
