= Sultan Al-Bargan =

Saudi Arabian footballer (1983–2018)

Personal information
- Full name: Sultan Abdullah Al Bargan
- Date of birth: 15 February 1983
- Place of birth: Saudi Arabia
- Date of death: 27 November 2018 (aged 35)
- Height: 1.79 m (5 ft 10 1/2 in)
- Position: Midfielder

Youth career
- 1990–2000: Al-Hilal

Senior career*
Years	Team	Apps	(Gls)
2000–2011	Al-Hilal		
2008–2009	→ Al-Ettifaq (loan)		
2010	→ Al-Ettifaq (loan)	7	(0)
2011–2014	Al-Ettifaq	58	(0)
2014–2015	Al-Shoalah	23	(0)
2015–2016	Al-Raed	6	(0)
- * Club domestic league appearances and goals

Sultan Al-Bargan (Arabic: سلطان البرقان) (15 February 1983 – 27 November 2018) was a Saudi Arabian football player. He died on 27 November 2018 due to complications from a stroke.

Al-Bargan appeared for Al-Hilal in the group stage of the 2006 AFC Champions League. He also played for the Al-Hilal side which reached the semi-finals of the 2010 AFC Champions League.
