= Mohammad Al-Sahlawi =

Saudi Arabian footballer (born 1987)

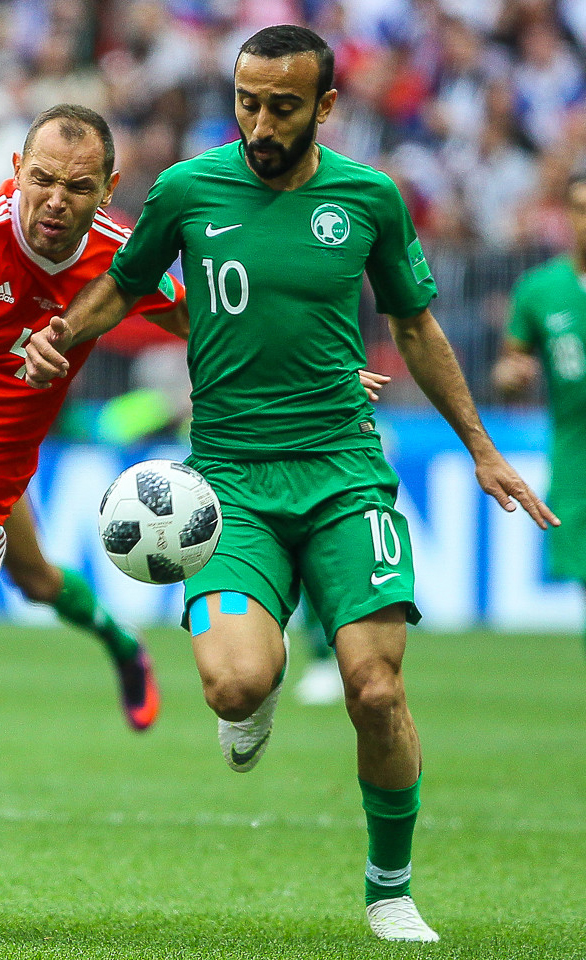
- Al-Sahlawi with Saudi Arabia at the 2018 FIFA World Cup

Personal information
- Full name: Mohammad Ibrahim Mohammad Al-Sahlawi
- Date of birth: 10 January 1987 (age 39)
- Place of birth: Hofuf, Saudi Arabia
- Height: 1.80 m (5 ft 11 in)
- Position: Striker

Team information
- Current team: Al-Safa
- Number: 10

Youth career
- 2003–2005: Al-Qadsiah

Senior career*
| Years | Team | Apps | (Gls) |
| 2005–2009 | Al-Qadsiah | 52 | (21) |
| 2008 | → Al-Fateh (loan) | 5 | (1) |
| 2009–2019 | Al-Nassr | 205 | (103) |
| 2019–2020 | Al-Shabab | 7 | (0) |
| 2020–2021 | Al-Taawoun | 20 | (2) |
| 2021 | Muaither | 4 | (2) |
| 2022 | Al-Hazem | 8 | (0) |
| 2023– | Al-Safa | 26 | (9) |

International career^{‡}
| 2006–2007 | Saudi Arabia U20 | 6 | (5) |
| 2007–2008 | Saudi Arabia U23 | 11 | (2) |
| 2010–2018 | Saudi Arabia | 42 | (28) |
- * Club domestic league appearances and goals as of 3 November 2024 ‡ National team caps and goals as of 21 August 2018

Mohammad Ibrahim Mohammad Al-Sahlawi (Arabic: مُحَمَّد إِبْرَاهِيم مُحَمَّد السَّهْلَاوِيّ; born 10 January 1987) is a Saudi Arabian professional footballer who plays as a striker for Al-Safa.

== Club career ==
=== Al-Qadsiah ===
Al-Sahlawi was 17 years old when his talent started to become apparent, during his participation in the "Karkiz" Championship which led to Adel Body (the administrative of Al-Qadsiah Handball) registering him in Al-Qadsiah, so he signed for SR40,000 and a car. After only two seasons, specifically in the 2006–07 season (when Yasser Al-Qahtani moved to Al-Hilal with the largest deal ever at that time), Sahlawi broke into the first team squad and had to assume responsibility of the Al-Qadsiah attack alongside his teammate Yousef Al-Salem. Following administration issues, Al-Sahlawi experienced a difficult period where he was relegated to the bench, while at the same time he was leading the Saudi Olympic team.

Following Al-Qadsiah's relegation to the first division and the departure of most of the star players in the team. Al-Sahlawi was lent to Al-Fateh and played five matches scoring one goal. Despite other offers, he returned to Al-Qadsiah. In his return season, he scored 18 goals and registered 8 assists. At the end of the season, he signed a new deal with Al-Qadsiah for three years for a contract worth SR3 million. He ended the 2008 season as the Top Goalscorer in the Saudi First Division.

=== Al-Nassr ===
He moved to Al-Nassr in 2009 for SR32 million ($8 million), breaking Yasser Al-Qahtani record transfer as the largest deal in Saudi football history.

In his first season with Al-Nassr, Al-Sahlawi scored 21 goals in 36 matches and received the Young Player of the Year award from STC.

In 2015, he was selected as one of the world's best top goalscorers by the IFFHS.

On 29 March 2018, it was confirmed that he will spend three weeks training with Manchester United in order to sharpen up his game ahead of the 2018 FIFA World Cup in Russia.

=== Al-Shabab ===
On 2 August 2019, Al-Shabab announced signing with Al-Sahlawi on a free transfer.

=== Muaither ===
On 2 August 2021, Al-Sahlawi announced that he would be joining Qatari side Muaither on his Twitter account.

=== Al-Hazem ===
On 14 December 2021, Al-Hazem announced signing with Al-Sahlawi on a free transfer.

=== Al-Safa ===
On 16 September 2023, Al-Sahlawi joined Saudi First Division League side Al-Safa.

== International career ==
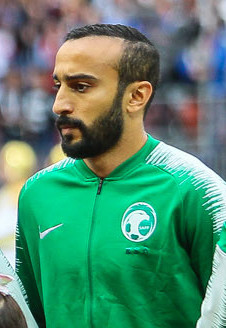
Al-Sahlawi with Saudi Arabia at the 2018 FIFA World Cup.

=== Youth ===
Al-Sahlawi scored his first goal for the national team in the 2006 AFC Youth Championship against Iraq U-20 in the 52nd minute. The game ended in a draw with a score of 2–2. His second came against Malaysia U-20 within 13 minutes, and they won with a score of 2–0, although they lost in the quarter-finals against Japan U-20 1 goal to 2.

=== Senior ===
On 3 September 2015, Al-Sahlawi scored his first senior hat-trick, in a 7–0 defeat of Timor-Leste in a 2018 FIFA World Cup qualifier. He scored another 5 goals on 17 November 2015 in a 10–0 drubbing of Timor-Leste.

In May 2018, he was named in Saudi Arabia’s preliminary squad for the 2018 FIFA World Cup in Russia. He was named in the final squad on 4 June.

== Career statistics ==
=== Club ===
As of match played on 31 May 2021

Appearances and goals by club, season and competition
| Club | Season | League | | | Cup | | League Cup | | Asia | | Other | | Total | |
| Club | Season | Division | Apps | Goals | Apps | Goals | Apps | Goals | Apps | Goals | Apps | Goals | Apps | Goals |
|---|---|---|---|---|---|---|---|---|---|---|---|---|---|---|
| Al-Qadsiah | 2005–06 | Premier League | 8 | 1 | — | | 1 | 3 | — | | 0 | 0 | 9 | 4 |
| Al-Qadsiah | 2006–07 | Premier League | 11 | 2 | — | | 0 | 0 | — | | 5 (Note: Appearances in Prince Faisal bin Fahd Cup) | 2 | 14 | 4 |
| Al-Qadsiah | 2007–08 | Premier League | 13 | 3 | — | | 1 | 1 | — | | 4 | 1 | 17 | 5 |
| Al-Qadsiah | 2008–09 | First Division | 20 | 15 | — | | 3 | 3 | — | | 0 | 0 | 23 | 18 |
| Total | | | 52 | 21 | 0 | 0 | 5 | 7 | 0 | 0 | 9 | 3 | 66 | 31 |
| Al-Fateh (loan) | 2007–08 | First Division | 5 | 1 | — | | | | | | 0 | 0 | 5 | 1 |
| Al-Nassr | 2009–10 | Pro League | 20 | 11 | 2 | 1 | 2 | 0 | — | | 5 (Note: Five appearances and two goals in GCC Champions League) | 2 | 29 | 14 |
| Al-Nassr | 2010–11 | Pro League | 20 | 5 | 1 | 0 | 1 | 0 | 6 | 1 | — | | 28 | 6 |
| Al-Nassr | 2011–12 | Pro League | 22 | 15 | 5 | 1 | 2 | 1 | — | | | | 29 | 17 |
| Al-Nassr | 2012–13 | Pro League | 25 | 10 | 2 | 1 | 4 | 3 | — | | 4 (Note: Appearances in Arab Club Champions Cup) | 2 | 35 | 16 |
| Al-Nassr | 2013–14 | Pro League | 23 | 17 | 1 | 0 | 2 | 1 | — | | | | 26 | 18 |
| Al-Nassr | 2014–15 | Pro League | 24 | 21 | 5 | 2 | 3 | 1 | 4 | 0 | 1 (Note: Appearances in Saudi Super Cup) | 1 | 37 | 25 |
| Al-Nassr | 2015–16 | Pro League | 20 | 5 | 1 | 2 | 3 | 3 | 4 | 0 | 1 | 0 | 29 | 10 |
| Al-Nassr | 2016–17 | Pro League | 21 | 8 | 3 | 1 | 3 | 2 | — | | | | 27 | 11 |
| Al-Nassr | 2017–18 | Pro League | 19 | 10 | 2 | 2 | — | | | | 3 | 0 | 24 | 12 |
| Al-Nassr | 2018–19 | Pro League | 11 | 1 | 1 | 0 | — | | 0 | 0 | 3 | 1 | 15 | 2 |
| Total | | | 205 | 103 | 23 | 10 | 20 | 11 | 14 | 1 | 17 | 6 | 279 | 131 |
| Al-Shabab | 2019–20 | Pro League | 7 | 0 | 2 | 1 | — | | | | 2 | 1 | 11 | 2 |
| Al-Taawoun | 2019–20 | Pro League | 8 | 2 | 0 | 0 | — | | 5 | 1 | — | | 13 | 3 |
| Al-Taawoun | 2020–21 | Pro League | 12 | 0 | 1 | 0 | — | | — | | — | | 13 | 0 |
| Total | | | 20 | 2 | 1 | 0 | 0 | 0 | 5 | 1 | 0 | 0 | 26 | 3 |
| Career total | | | 289 | 127 | 26 | 11 | 25 | 18 | 19 | 2 | 34 | 18 | 393 | 176 |

=== International ===
Statistics accurate as of match played 20 June 2018.

Saudi Arabia
| Year | Apps | Goals |
|---|---|---|
| 2010 | 1 | 1 |
| 2011 | 3 | 1 |
| 2012 | 5 | 2 |
| 2013 | 2 | 0 |
| 2014 | 2 | 0 |
| 2015 | 10 | 18 |
| 2016 | 3 | 2 |
| 2017 | 7 | 4 |
| 2018 | 9 | 0 |
| Total | 42 | 28 |

=== International goals ===
As of 8 June 2017

Score and Result list Saudi Arabia's goal tally first

International goals
| # | Date | Venue | Opponent | Score | Result | Competition |
|---|---|---|---|---|---|---|
| 1. | 29 May 2010 | Tivoli Neu, Innsbruck, Austria | Spain | 2–2 | 2–3 | Friendly |
| 2. | 28 July 2011 | Siu Sai Wan Sports Ground, Siu Sai Wan, Hong Kong | Hong Kong | 4–0 | 5–0 | 2014 FIFA World Cup qualification |
| 3. | 22 June 2012 | King Fahd Stadium, Taif, Saudi Arabia | Kuwait | 1–0 | 4–0 | 2012 Arab Nations Cup |
| 4. | 22 June 2012 | King Fahd Stadium, Taif, Saudi Arabia | Kuwait | 4–0 | 4–0 | 2012 Arab Nations Cup |
| 5. | 14 January 2015 | Melbourne Rectangular Stadium, Melbourne, Australia | North Korea | 2–1 | 4–1 | 2015 AFC Asian Cup |
| 6. | 14 January 2015 | Melbourne Rectangular Stadium, Melbourne, Australia | North Korea | 3–1 | 4–1 | 2015 AFC Asian Cup |
| 7. | 18 January 2015 | Melbourne Rectangular Stadium, Melbourne, Australia | Uzbekistan | 1–1 | 1–3 | 2015 AFC Asian Cup |
| 8. | 30 March 2015 | Prince Mohamed bin Fahd Stadium, Dammam, Saudi Arabia | Jordan | 1–0 | 2–1 | Friendly |
| 9. | 30 March 2015 | Prince Mohamed bin Fahd Stadium, Dammam, Saudi Arabia | Jordan | 2–1 | 2–1 | Friendly |
| 10. | 11 June 2015 | Prince Mohamed bin Fahd Stadium, Dammam, Saudi Arabia | Palestine | 2–0 | 3–2 | 2018 FIFA World Cup qualification |
| 11. | 11 June 2015 | Prince Mohamed bin Fahd Stadium, Dammam, Saudi Arabia | Palestine | 3–2 | 3–2 | 2018 FIFA World Cup qualification |
| 12. | 3 September 2015 | King Abdullah Sports City, Jeddah, Saudi Arabia | Timor-Leste | 2–0 | 7–0 | 2018 FIFA World Cup qualification |
| 13. | 3 September 2015 | King Abdullah Sports City, Jeddah, Saudi Arabia | Timor-Leste | 3–0 | 7–0 | 2018 FIFA World Cup qualification |
| 14. | 3 September 2015 | King Abdullah Sports City, Jeddah, Saudi Arabia | Timor-Leste | 6–0 | 7–0 | 2018 FIFA World Cup qualification |
| 15. | 8 September 2015 | Shah Alam Stadium, Shah Alam, Malaysia | Malaysia | 2–1 | 2–1 | 2018 FIFA World Cup qualification |
| 16. | 8 October 2015 | King Abdullah Sports City, Jeddah, Saudi Arabia | United Arab Emirates | 1–1 | 2–1 | 2018 FIFA World Cup qualification |
| 17. | 8 October 2015 | King Abdullah Sports City, Jeddah, Saudi Arabia | United Arab Emirates | 2–1 | 2–1 | 2018 FIFA World Cup qualification |
| 18. | 17 November 2015 | National Stadium, Dili, East Timor | Timor-Leste | 1–0 | 10–0 | 2018 FIFA World Cup qualification |
| 19. | 17 November 2015 | National Stadium, Dili, East Timor | Timor-Leste | 4–0 | 10–0 | 2018 FIFA World Cup qualification |
| 20. | 17 November 2015 | National Stadium, Dili, East Timor | Timor-Leste | 5–0 | 10–0 | 2018 FIFA World Cup qualification |
| 21. | 17 November 2015 | National Stadium, Dili, East Timor | Timor-Leste | 6–0 | 10–0 | 2018 FIFA World Cup qualification |
| 22. | 17 November 2015 | National Stadium, Dili, East Timor | Timor-Leste | 8–0 | 10–0 | 2018 FIFA World Cup qualification |
| 23. | 24 March 2016 | King Abdullah Sports City, Jeddah, Saudi Arabia | Malaysia | 1–0 | 2–0 | 2018 FIFA World Cup qualification |
| 24. | 24 August 2016 | Grand Hamad Stadium, Doha, Qatar | Laos | 2–0 | 4–0 | Friendly |
| 25. | 14 January 2017 | Zayed Sports City Stadium, Abu Dhabi, United Arab Emirates | Cambodia | 4–2 | 7–2 | Friendly |
| 26. | 14 January 2017 | Zayed Sports City Stadium, Abu Dhabi, United Arab Emirates | Cambodia | 6–2 | 7–2 | Friendly |
| 27. | 23 March 2017 | Rajamangala Stadium, Bangkok, Thailand | Thailand | 1–0 | 3–0 | 2018 FIFA World Cup qualification |
| 28. | 8 June 2017 | Adelaide Oval, Adelaide, Australia | Australia | 2–2 | 2–3 | 2018 FIFA World Cup qualification |

== Honours ==
=== Club ===
Al-Qadsiah

- Saudi First Division League: 2008–09

Al-Nassr

- Saudi Pro League: 2013–14, 2014–15, 2018–19
- Crown Prince's Cup: 2013–14

Individual

- Saudi Pro League Footballer of the Year: 2013–14, 2014–15
- Saudi First Division League Top scorer: 2008–09
- Best Gulf Player: 2015
- STC Young Player of the Year: 2009
