= Adnan Fallatah =

Saudi Arabian footballer

Personal information
- Full name: Adnan Ibrahim Fallatah
- Date of birth: October 20, 1983 (age 43)
- Place of birth: Mecca, Saudi Arabia
- Height: 1.68 m (5 ft 6 in)
- Position: Left-back

Youth career
- Al-Ittihad

Senior career*
Years	Team	Apps	(Gls)
2004–2011	Al-Ittihad		
2011	→ Al-Wehda (loan)	8	(0)
2011–2012	Al-Nassr	8	(0)
2012–2013	Al-Fateh	24	(0)
2013–2016	Al-Taawoun	65	(7)
2016–2018	Al-Ittihad	37	(4)
2018–2019	Al-Qadsiah	16	(0)
2019–2020	Abha	0	(0)
- * Club domestic league appearances and goals as of 13 February 2020

Adnan Ibrahim Fallattah [عدنان فلاته in Arabic] (born 20 October 1983) is a Saudi football player who currently plays as a left-back he last played for Al-Ittihad.

== Honours ==
Al-Ittihad

- Pro League: 2006–07, 2008–09
- King Cup: 2010, 2018
- Crown Prince Cup: 2004, 2016–17
- AFC Champions League: 2004, 2005
- Arab Champions League: 2004–05

Al-Fateh

- Pro League: 2012–13
