= 2008–09 Al-Nassr FC season =

Al Nassr FC
2008-09 season
- Chairman: (Saudi Arabia) Prince Faisal Bin Abdulrahman Bin Saud
- Manager: (Argentina) Edgardo Bauza
- Saudi Professional League: 5th
- King Cup of Champions: Quarter-final
- Crown Prince Cup: Semi-final
- Saudi Federation cup: Runners-up
- Gulf Club Champions Cup: Runners-up
- Under 20: 3rd
- Under 17: 7th
- Top goalscorer: League: 6 Goals: Belal; All: 10 Goals: Belal

The 2008–09 season was Al-Nassr's 33rd consecutive season in the top flight of Saudi football and 53rd year in existence as a football club

== Team kit ==
Supplier: Lotto
Sponsor(s): Saudi Telecom Company

Home	Away

== Current first team squad ==
Note: Flags indicate national team as defined under FIFA eligibility rules; some limited exceptions apply. Players may hold more than one non-FIFA nationality.

No.	Pos.	Nation	Player
1	GK	KSA	Khalid Radhy
2	DF	KSA	Majed Hazzazi
3	DF	KSA	Abdoh Baker Bernaoy
4	DF	KSA	Hamad Al-Sagoor
5	DF	KSA	Ahmad Al-Bahri (captain)
6	MF	KSA	Mohsen Al-Garni
7	MF	BRA	Élton José Xavier Gomes
9	MF	KSA	Awad AL-otabi
10	MF	EGY	Hossam Ghaly
11	FW	KSA	Saad Al-Harthi
12	DF	KSA	Ibrahim Sharaheli
13	DF	KSA	Meshaal Al-Mutairi
14	FW	OMA	Hassan Rabia
15	MF	KSA	Ahmed Al-Mubarak
16	MF	KSA	Fahad Al-Zahrani

No.	Pos.	Nation	Player
17	FW	KSA	Mohammed Al-Shahrani
18	MF	KSA	Ala Al-Kuwaikabi
19	MF	KSA	Yousef Al-Muwaine
20	DF	BRA	Éder Gaúcho
21	GK	KSA	Kameel Al-Wabary
22	GK	KSA	Mohammed Al-Khojali
23	MF	KSA	Abdullah Al-Waked
24	GK	KSA	Mohammad Sharifi
25	MF	KSA	Abdulla Al-Mousa
28	DF	KSA	Ibrahim Madkhali
29	FW	KSA	Ryan Belal
30	MF	KSA	Ahmed Al-Hadrami
-	MF	KSA	Dhaya haroon
-	FW	KSA	Abdulrahman Al-Bishi
-	MF	KSA	Abdullah Hammad

== Saudi Professional League ==
=== Results ===
2008-09-14

Al Nassr FC	2 – 1	Al-Ahli
Élton 58'; Razak 69' (pen.)	(Report)	Al-Raheb 2'

King Fahd Stadium, Riyadh

2008-09-18

Al-Wahda	1 – 2	Al Nassr FC
Al-Akrot 86'	(Report)	Al-Mobarak 39'; Al-Harthi 82'

King Abdul Aziz Stadium, Mecca

2008-10-04

Al-Ittifaq	1 – 1	Al Nassr FC
Yousef Al Muwaine 26' (o.g.)		Al-Harthi 90'

Mohamed bin Fahd Stadium, Dammam

2008-10-08

Al Nassr FC	2 – 2	Al-Ittihad
Al-Mobarak 45' 63'	(Report)	Noor 2' (pen.) 45'

Faisal bin Fahd Stadium, Riyadh

2008-10-12

Al-Raed	0 – 1	Al Nassr FC
	(Report)	Al-shahrani 33'

King Abdullah Stadium, Buraidah

2008-10-18

Al-Hilal	2 – 1	Al Nassr FC
Al Qahtani 18'; Al-Fraidi 37'	(Report)	Élton 91'

King Fahd Stadium, Riyadh

2008-10-22

Al Nassr FC	1 – 0	Al-Watani
Al-Harthi 75'	(Report)

Faisal bin Fahd Stadium, Riyadh

2008-10-29

Al Nassr FC	3 – 1	Al Hazm
Belal 8' 82'; Kajovano 64' (o.g.)	(Report)	Al-Mutairi 25'

Faisal bin Fahd Stadium, Riyadh

2008-11-04

Najran	1 – 0	Al Nassr FC
safy 32'	(Report)

Al-Akdood Stadium, Najran

2008-11-22

Al Nassr FC	0 – 0	Al-Shabab
	(Report)

Faisal bin Fahd Stadium, Riyadh

2008-12-11

Al-Ahli	2 – 0	Al Nassr FC
Al-Raheb 24'; Massad 44'	(Report)

Abdullah al-Faisal Stadium, Jeddah

2008-12-19

Al Nassr FC	1 – 0	Al-Ittifaq
Razak 89'	(Report)

Faisal bin Fahd Stadium, Riyadh

2009-01-19

Al-Ittihad	1 – 0	Al Nassr FC
Emad 52' (pen.)	(Report)

Abdullah al-Faisal Stadium, Jeddah

2009-01-23

Al Nassr FC	0 – 2	Al-Hilal
	(Report)	Al Qahtani 71'; Mirel Rădoi 79'

King Fahd Stadium, Riyadh

2009-01-28

Al Nassr FC	1 – 0	Al-Raed
Belal 16'	(Report)

Faisal bin Fahd Stadium, Riyadh

2009-03-05

Al-Watani	1 – 2	Al Nassr FC
Diop 89'	(Report)	Élton 12' (pen.); Al-Bahri 73' (pen.)

Khalid bin Abdul Aziz Stadium, Tabuk

2009-03-18

Al Nassr FC	3 – 1	Al-Wahda
Ghaly 14'; Belal 39' 45'	(Report)	Al-Khaibari 56' (pen.)

Faisal bin Fahd Stadium, Riyadh

2009-03-23

Al Hazm	1 – 0	Al Nassr FC
Al-Mowalad 41'	(Report)

Al Hazm Stadium, Ar Rass

2009-03-29

Abha	2 – 2	Al Nassr FC
Al-Yami 60'; Al-Faraj 69'	(Report)	Belal 26'; Al-Bishi 81' (pen.)

Prince Sultan bin Abdul Aziz Stadium, Abha

2009-04-04

Al-Shabab	2 – 1	Al Nassr FC
Camacho 27'; Al-Saran 53'	(Report)	Al-Bishi 81' (pen.)

King Fahd Stadium, Riyadh

2009-04-08

Al Nassr FC	0 – 1	Abha
	(Report)	Al-Amry 90'

King Fahd Stadium, Riyadh

2009-04-12

Al Nassr FC	1 – 0	Najran
Éder 18'	(Report)

King Fahd Stadium, Riyadh

=== Results summary ===
Overall								Home						Away					
Pld	W	D	L	GF	GA	GD	Pts	W	D	L	GF	GA	GD	W	D	L	GF	GA	GD
22	10	4	8	24	22	+2	34	7	2	2	14	8	+6	3	2	6	10	14	−4

=== Results by round ===
Win Draw Loss

Round	1	2	3	4	5	6	7	8	9	10	11	12	13	14	15	16	17	18	19	20	21	22
Ground	H	A	A	H	A	A	H	H	A	H	A	H	A	H	H	A	H	A	A	A	H	H
Result	2-1	2-1	1-1	2-2	1-0	1-2	1-0	3-1	0-1	0-0	0-2	1-0	0-1	0-2	1-0	2-1	3-1	0-1	2-2	1-2	0-1	1-0

=== Al-Nasr Standing in 2008-2009 League ===
Last Updated 2009-04-09
Team		Pts	G	W	D	L	GF	GA	GD
4	Al-Shabab	35	22	10	5	7	37	29	+8
5	Al-Nasr	34	22	10	4	8	24	22	+2
6	Ittifaq	29	22	7	8	7	23	20	+3
Pts – points earned; G – games played; W - wins; D - draws; L - losses; GF – goals for; GA – goals against; GD – goal differential

=== Disciplinary record ===
Disciplinary records for 2008–09 league matches. Players with 1 card or more included only.

No.	Nat.	Player	Yellow cards	Red cards
2	(Saudi Arabia)	Majed Hazzazi	1	0
3	(Saudi Arabia)	Abdoh Baker Bernaoy	2	0
4	(Saudi Arabia)	Hamad Al-Sagoor	1	0
4	(Saudi Arabia)	Ahmad Al-Bahri	1	1
7	(Brazil)	Élton José Xavier Gomes	2	0
10	(Egypt)	Hossam Ghaly	2	1
11	(Saudi Arabia)	Saad Al-Harthi	1	0
12	(Saudi Arabia)	Ibraheam Shraheali	1	0
13	(Saudi Arabia)	Mishal Al-Mutairi	2	1
15	(Saudi Arabia)	Ahmed Al-Mobarak	1	0
16	(Saudi Arabia)	Fahad Al-Zahrani	1	0
18	(Saudi Arabia)	Ala Al-Kuwaikabi	1	0
19	(Saudi Arabia)	Yousef Al Muwaine	3	0
23	(Saudi Arabia)	Abdullah Al-Waked	1	0
25	(Saudi Arabia)	Abdullah Hammad	2	0
28	(Saudi Arabia)	Ibraheem Madkaly	1	1

== King Cup of Champions ==
=== Quarter-final ===
Team 1	Agg.	Team 2	1st leg	2nd leg
Al Nassr FC	1-1	Al-Hilal	1-1	0-0

Al-Hilal qualified by Away goals rule.

==== First leg ====
2009-04-17

Al Nassr FC	1–1	Al-Hilal
Belal 21'	(Report)	Wilhelmsson 89'

King Fahd Stadium, Riyadh

==== Second leg ====
2009-04-26

Al-Hilal	0–0	Al Nassr FC
	(Report)

King Fahd Stadium, Riyadh

== Crown Prince Cup ==
=== Round of 16 ===
2009-02-14

Al Nassr FC	2 – 0	Al-Faiha
Élton 34'; Ghaly 88' (pen.)	(Report)

King Fahd Stadium, Riyadh

=== Quarter-final ===
2009-02-19

Al-Ittihad	1 – 1 (aet) (3 – 5 pen.)	Al Nassr FC
Noor 118'	(Report)	Belal 114'
Penalties
Renato (penalty scored) Mohammed Noor (penalty scored); Saleh Al-Saqri (penalty scored) Emad Moteab (penalty missed)	3 – 5	(penalty scored) Hossam Ghaly (penalty scored) Élton José; (penalty scored) Abdullah Al-Waked; (penalty scored) Éder Gaúcho (penalty scored) Abdoh Baker Bernaoy

Abdullah al-Faisal Stadium, Jeddah

=== Semi-final ===
2009-02-23

Al-Hilal	1 – 0	Al Nassr FC
Wilhelmsson 7'

King Fahd Stadium, Riyadh

== Saudi Federation cup ==
=== Group stage ===
2008-12-24

Abha	0 – 2	Al Nassr FC
	(Report)	Élton 20'; Awad AL-otabi 71'

Sultan bin Abdul Aziz Stadium

2009-01-01

Al Nassr FC	1 – 0	Al-Ittifaq
Élton 50'	(Report)

Faisal bin Fahd Stadium, Riyadh

2009-01-06

Al Nassr FC	1 – 0	Abha
Élton 72' (pen.)	(Report)

Faisal bin Fahd Stadium, Riyadh

2009-01-15

Al-Ittifaq	0 – 2	Al Nassr FC
	(Report)	Belal 28'; Al-shahrani 74'

Saud bin Jalawi Stadium, Khobar

=== Group D Standing ===
Final Standing
Team		Pts	G	W	D	L	GF	GA	GD
1	Al-Nasr	12	4	4	0	0	6	0	+6
2	Al-Ittifaq	6	4	2	0	2	3	3	0
3	Abha	0	4	0	0	4	0	6	-6
Pts – points earned; G – games played; W - wins; D - draws; L - losses; GF – goals for; GA – goals against; GD – goal differential

Teams qualified to the semifinals

=== Semi-finals ===
2009-02-04

Al Nassr FC	1 – 0	Al-Ittihad
Élton 88'	(Report)

King Fahd Stadium, Riyadh

=== Final ===
2009-03-14

Al-Shabab	0 – 0 (aet) (4 – 3 pen.)	Al Nassr FC
	(Report)
Penalties
Camacho (penalty scored) Hassan Muath (penalty scored); Ahmed Otaif (penalty missed); Saleh Sadeeq (penalty missed); Nasser Al-Shamrani (penalty scored) Abdoh Otaif (penalty scored)	4 – 3	(penalty scored) Élton (penalty missed) Éder Gaúcho; (penalty missed) Ryan Belal; (penalty scored) Ibraheem Madkaly; (penalty scored) Ahmad Al-Bahri (penalty missed) Hamad Al-Sagoor

King Fahd Stadium, Riyadh

== Gulf Club Champions Cup ==
=== Group stage ===
2008-08-16

Al-Nasr (Saudi Arabia)	0 – 1	(Kuwait) Al Qadisiya
	(Report)	Selim Ben Achour 17'

Al-Khawr Stadium, Qatar

2008-08-19

Al-Nasr (Saudi Arabia)	0 – 0	(Bahrain) Al-Muharraq
	(Report)

Al-Khawr Stadium, Qatar

2008-08-23

Al-Nasr (Saudi Arabia)	2 – 1	(Oman) Al-Nahda
Mohammed Al-shahrani 12'; Ryan Belal 29'	(Report)	Salim Al-Shamsi 76'

Al-Khawr Stadium, Qatar

2008-08-26

Al-Nasr (Saudi Arabia)	3 – 1	(Qatar) Al-Khor
Mohammed Al-shahrani 52' 85'; Élton José 62'	(Report)	Fabricio Souza 65'

Al-Khawr Stadium, Qatar

=== Group A Standing ===
Final Standing
Team		Pts	G	W	D	L	GF	GA	GD
1	(Kuwait) Al Qadisiya	10	4	3	1	0	11	1	+10
2	(Saudi Arabia) Al-Nasr	7	4	2	1	1	5	3	+2
3	(Bahrain) Al-Muharraq	6	4	3	1	0	4	2	+2
4	(Qatar) Al-Khor	2	4	0	2	2	3	10	-7
5	(Oman) Al-Nahda	1	4	0	1	3	2	9	-7
Pts – points earned; G – games played; W - wins; D - draws; L - losses; GF – goals for; GA – goals against; GD – goal differential

Teams qualified to the semifinals

=== Semi-final ===
Al-Nasr Game against Al-Ahli was supposed to be the semi-final. However, FIFA suspended the Kuwait Football Association and Kuwaiti National Teams and clubs were suspended from all international matches and activities because of the government interference in the affairs of the football federation. Therefore, the other semi final between Al Qadisiya and Al Salmiya (both from Kuwait) has been canceled and Al-Nasr and Al-Ahli match was considered as the final.

=== Final ===
==== First leg ====
2008-11-28

Al-Ahli (Saudi Arabia)	1–0	(Saudi Arabia) Al-Nasr
Al Raheb 34'	(Report)

Abdullah al-Faisal Stadium, Jeddah

==== Second leg ====
2008-12-03

Al-Nasr (Saudi Arabia)	0–2	(Saudi Arabia) Al-Ahli
	(Report)	Al Raheb 68'; Al-Kharashi 81'

King Fahd Stadium, Riyadh

=== Goal scorers ===
Position	Nation	Number	Name	League	King Cup	CP Cup	FED. Cup	Gulf Cup	Total
1	(Saudi Arabia)	29	Ryan Belal	6	1	1	1	1	10
2	(Brazil)	7	Élton José	3	0	1	4	1	9
3	(Saudi Arabia)	17	Mohammed Al-shahrani	1	0	0	1	3	5
4	(Saudi Arabia)	15	Ahmed Al-Mobarak	3	0	0	0	0	3
=	(Saudi Arabia)	11	Saad Al-Harthi	3	0	0	0	0	3
5	(Benin)	/	Razak Omotoyossi	2	/	/	0	0	2
=	(Egypt)	10	Hossam Ghaly	1	0	1	0	/	2
=	(Saudi Arabia)	10	Abdulrahman Al-Bishi	2	0	0	0	/	2
6	(Saudi Arabia)	9	Awad AL-otabi	0	0	0	1	0	1
=	(Saudi Arabia)	5	Ahmad Al-Bahri	1	0	0	0	/	1
=	(Saudi Arabia)	20	Éder Gaúcho	1	0	0	0	/	1
/	/	/	TOTALS	24	1	3	7	5	40

== Under 20 Team ==
=== Results ===
2008-11-20

Al Nassr FC	1 – 1	Al-Ittifaq

Al-Nasr, Riyadh
2008-11-27

Al-Shabab	1 – 0	Al Nassr FC

Al-Shabab, Riyadh
2008-12-01

Al Nassr FC	4 – 1	Najran

Al-Nasr, Riyadh
2008-12-17

Al Nassr FC	2 – 2	Hottain

Al-Nasr, Riyadh
2008-12-21

Al-Ahli	0 – 1	Al Nassr FC

Al-Ahli, Jeddah
2008-12-26

Al Nassr FC	0 – 0	Al-Ta'ee

Al-Nasr, Riyadh
2009-01-01

Al-Ittihad	1 – 2	Al Nassr FC

Al-Ittihad, Jeddah
2009-01-08

Al Nassr FC	1 – 2	Al-Hilal

Al-Nasr, Riyadh
2008-01-16

Al-Batin	1 – 1	Al Nassr FC

Al-Batin, Hafer Al-Batin
2009-01-23

Al Nassr FC	2 – 0	Al-Wahda

Al-Nasr, Riyadh
2009-01-29

Al-Fath	1 – 2	Al Nassr FC

Al-Fath, Al-Hasa
2009-02-26

Al-Ittifaq	1 – 1	Al Nassr FC

Al-Ittifaq, Dammam
2009-03-05

Al Nassr FC	0 – 0	Al-Shabab

Al-Nasr, Riyadh
2009-03-12

Najran	1 – 2	Al Nassr FC

Najran, Najran
2009-03-19

Hottain	4 – 1	Al Nassr FC

Hottain, Jizan
2009-03-25

Al Nassr FC	3 – 1	Al-Ahli

Al-Nasr, Riyadh
2009-03-29

Al-Ta'ee	0 – 3	Al Nassr FC

Al-Ta'ee, Ha'il
2009-04-03

Al Nassr FC	1 – 0	Al-Ittihad

Al-Nasr, Riyadh
2009-04-09

Al-Hilal	0 – 2	Al Nassr FC

Al-Hilal, Riyadh
2009-04-17

Al Nassr FC	1 – 0	Al-Batin

Al-Nasr, Riyadh
2009-04-24

Al-Wahda	0 – 1	Al Nassr FC

Al-Wahda, Mecca
2009-05-01

Al Nassr FC	2 – 2	Al-Fath

Al-Nasr, Riyadh

=== Results by round ===
Win Draw Loss

Round	1	2	3	4	5	6	7	8	9	10	11	12	13	14	15	16	17	18	19	20	21	22
Ground	H	A	H	H	A	H	A	H	A	H	A	A	H	A	A	H	A	H	A	H	A	H
Result	1-1	0-1	4-1	2-2	1-0	0-0	2-1	1-2	1-1	2-0	2-1	1-1	0-0	2-1	1-4	3-1	3-0	1-0	2-0	1-0	1-0	2-2

=== Al-Nasr Standing ===
Last Updated 2009-04-25
Team		Pts	G	W	D	L	GF	GA	GD
3	Al-Nasr	43	22	12	7	3	35	21	+14
Pts – points earned; G – games played; W - wins; D - draws; L - losses; GF – goals for; GA – goals against; GD – goal differential

== Under 17 Team ==
=== Results ===
2008-11-13

Al Nassr FC	5 – 1	Al-Okdod

Al-Nasr, Riyadh
2008-11-20

Al-Ansar	0 – 3	Al Nassr FC

Al-Ansar, Medina
2008-11-26

Al Nassr FC	3 – 4	Al-Ittihad

Al-Nasr, Riyadh
2008-11-30

Al-Ittifaq	2 – 2	Al Nassr FC

Al-Ittifaq, Dammam
2008-12-18

Al Nassr FC	5 – 0	Al-Ahli

Al-Nasr, Riyadh
2008-12-24

Al-Ta'ee	1 – 0	Al Nassr FC

Al-Ta'ee, Ha'il
2008-12-28

Al Nassr FC	2 – 0	Al-Fath

Al-Nasr, Riyadh
2009-01-02

Al-Wahda	2 – 2	Al Nassr FC

Al-Wahda, Mecca
2009-01-09

Al Nassr FC	1 – 0	Al-Shabab

Al-Nasr, Riyadh
2009-01-15

Hottain	1 – 1	Al Nassr FC

Hottain, Jizan
2009-01-22

Al Nassr FC	1 – 3	Al-Hilal

Al-Nasr, Riyadh
2009-01-29

Al-Okdod	2 – 1	Al Nassr FC

Al-Okdod, Najran
2009-02-26

Al Nassr FC	0 – 0	Al-Ansar

Al-Nasr, Riyadh
2009-03-05

Al-Ittihad	2 – 0	Al Nassr FC

Al-Ittihad, Jeddah
2009-03-12

Al Nassr FC	1 – 1	Al-Ittifaq

Al-Nasr, Riyadh
2009-03-19

Al-Ahli	1 – 0	Al Nassr FC

Al-Ahli, Jeddah
2009-03-26

Al Nassr FC	1 – 1	Al-Ta'ee

Al-Nasr, Riyadh
2009-04-02

Al-Fath	3 – 0	Al Nassr FC

Al-Fath, Al-Hasa
2009-04-09

Al Nassr FC	2 – 2	Al-Wahda

Al-Nasr, Riyadh
2009-04-16

Al-Shabab	1 – 1	Al Nassr FC

Al-Shabab, Riyadh
2009-04-23

Al Nassr FC	2 – 0	Hottain

Al-Nasr, Riyadh
2009-04-30

Al-Hilal	1 – 2	Al Nassr FC

Al-Hilal, Riyadh

=== Results by round ===
Win Draw Loss

Round	1	2	3	4	5	6	7	8	9	10	11	12	13	14	15	16	17	18	19	20	21	22
Ground	H	A	H	A	H	A	H	A	H	A	H	A	H	A	H	A	H	A	H	A	H	A
Result	5-1	3-0	3-4	2-2	5-0	0-1	2-0	2-2	1-0	1-1	1-3	1-2	0-0	0-2	1-1	0-1	1-1	0-3	2-2	1-1	2-0	2-1

=== Al-Nasr Standing ===
Last Updated 2009-04-25
Team		Pts	G	W	D	L	GF	GA	GD
7	Al-Nasr	29	22	7	8	7	35	28	+7
Pts – points earned; G – games played; W - wins; D - draws; L - losses; GF – goals for; GA – goals against; GD – goal differential
