= 2009–10 Al-Nassr FC season =

Al-Nassr
2009–10 season
- Chairman: Prince Faisal Bin Turki Bin Nasser
- Manager: Jorge da Silva
- Saudi Professional League: 3rd
- King Cup of Champions: 3rd
- Crown Prince Cup: Quarter-final
- Saudi Royal Federation cup: 1st round
- Gulf Club Champions Cup: Semi-final
- Under 20: 7th
- Under 17: 3rd
- Top goalscorer: League: Mohammad Sahlawi (11); All: Mohammad Sahlawi (20)

The 2009–10 season was Al-Nassr's 34th consecutive season in the top flight of Saudi football and 54th year in existence as a football club

== Team kit ==
Supplier: Lotto
Sponsor(s): Saudi Telecom Company

Home	Away	3rd

== Current first team squad ==
Note: Flags indicate national team as defined under FIFA eligibility rules; some limited exceptions apply. Players may hold more than one non-FIFA nationality.

No.	Pos.	Nation	Player
1	GK	KSA	Khalid Radhy
2	DF	KSA	Majed Hazzazi
3	DF	KSA	Abdoh Baker Bernaoy
4	DF	KSA	Mohamed Eid
5	DF	KSA	Ahmad Al-Bahri
6	MF	KSA	Ahmad Abbas
7	FW	KOR	Lee Chun-Soo
8	MF	ARG	Víctor Figueroa
10	FW	KSA	Mohammad Al-Sahlawi
11	FW	KSA	Saad Al-Harthi
14	MF	EGY	Hossam Ghaly
15	MF	KSA	Ahmed Al-Mobarak

No.	Pos.	Nation	Player
16	MF	KSA	Ibrahim Ghaleb
17	MF	KSA	Saud Hamood
18	DF	KSA	Abdullah Al-Garni
20	MF	GUI	Pascal Feindouno (on loan from Al-Rayyan)
21	GK	KSA	Kameel Al-Wabary
23	MF	KSA	Abdullah Al-Waked
24	DF	KSA	Hussein Sulaimani (captain)
25	MF	KSA	Khaled Al-Zylaeei
27	MF	KSA	Abdulla Al-Mousa
29	FW	KSA	Ryan Belal
32	DF	KSA	Ahmed Dokhi
33	DF	KSA	Saleh Sadeeq

== Saudi Professional League ==
=== Results ===
Kickoff times are in GMT+3.

25 August 2009	Al-Ittifaq	1–1	Al-Nassr	Mohamed bin Fahd, Dammam
22:15	Hussein 37' (o.g.)	(Report)	Hussein 71'

24 September 2009	Al-Nassr	0–2	Al-Shabab	King Fahd Stadium, Riyadh
20:10		(Report)	Al-Shamrani 50' 79'

29 September 2009	Al-Hilal	2–2	Al-Nassr	King Fahd Stadium, Riyadh
20:05	Fraidi 33'; Swaileh 71'	(Report)	Sahlawi 4' (pen.); Hussein 63'

5 October 2009	Al-Nassr	3–0	Al-Qadisiya	Faisal bin Fahd, Riyadh
19:50	Figueroa 29'; Harthi 35'; Ghaly 54'	(Report)

23 October 2009	Najran	1–1	Al-Nassr	Al-Ukhdood Stadium, Najran
19:45	Kamara 69'	(Report)	Sahlawi 66'

21 November 2009	Al-Ahli	3–3	Al-Nassr	Abdullah al-Faisal, Jeddah
19:45	Raheb 3'; Toledo 28'; Saheb 44'	(Report)	Figueroa 48' 78'; Belal 76'

4 December 2009	Al-Nassr	3–1	Al-Fath	Faisal bin Fahd, Riyadh
19:35	Sahlawi 47'; Soo 59' 74'	(Report)	Naeem 76' (pen.)

10 December 2009	Al-Raed	0–0	Al-Nassr	King Abdullah Stadium, Buraidah
19:35		(Report)

15 December 2009	Al Hazm	2–2	Al-Nassr	Al Hazm Stadium, Ar Rass
19:35	Jezani 66' (pen.); Aqqal 90+4'	(Report)	Taee 13' (o.g.); Sahlawi 27'

21 December 2009	Al-Nassr	1–0	Al-Ittifaq	Faisal bin Fahd, Riyadh
19:35	Belal 77'	(Report)

25 December 2009	Al-Shabab	3–2	Al-Nassr	Faisal bin Fahd, Riyadh
15:15	Shamrani 45+1'; Shuhail 53'; Astaa 67'	(Report)	Figueroa 47' 67'

31 December 2009	Al-Nassr	2–1	Al-Hilal	King Fahd Stadium, Riyadh
15:20	Garnei 7'; Sahlawi 70'	(Report)	Al-Shalhoub 94' (pen.)

6 January 2010	Al-Qadisiya	0–2	Al-Nassr	Saud bin Jalawi, Khobar
20:50		(Report)	Sahlawi 24'; Sahlawi 52'

10 January 2010	Al-Ittihad	1–2	Al-Nassr	Abdullah al-Faisal, Jeddah
20:50	Ahmed Hadid 56'	(Report)	Al-Garnei 30'; Sahlawi 79'

14 January 2010	Najran	2–3	Al-Nassr	Al-Ukhdood Stadium, Najran
19:55	Al-Yami 60'; Al-Yami 83' (pen.)	(Report)	Sahlawi 43' (pen.); Lee Chun-Soo 67'; Harthi 77'

19 January 2010	Al-Wahda	0–2	Al-Nassr	King Abdul Aziz Stadium, Mecca
19:55		(Report)	Hussein 38'; Figueroa 41'

24 January 2010	Al-Nassr	0–1	Al-Ittihad	King Fahd Stadium, Riyadh
20:00		(Report)	Talal Al-Meshal 9'

30 January 2010	Al-Nassr	1–1	Al-Ahli	King Fahd Stadium, Riyadh
20:00	Abbas 24'	(Report)	Simões 52'

25 February 2010	Al-Nassr	1–0	Al Hazm	Faisal bin Fahd, Riyadh
20:20	Figueroa 84' (pen.)

7 March 2010	Al-Nassr	1–0	Al-Wahda	Faisal bin Fahd, Riyadh
20:20	Pascal 65'

14 March 2010	Al Fateh	0–2	Al-Nassr	Prince Abdullah Bin Jlwai's Stadium, Al-Hasa
20:30			Figueroa 9'; Pascal 93'

18 March 2010	Al-Nassr	4–2	Al-Raed	King Fahd Stadium, Riyadh
20:30	Sahlawi 22' (pen.) 30'; Figueroa 38'; Abbas 80'		Musa Al-Shamri 29'; Garni 43'

=== Results summary ===
Overall								Home						Away					
Pld	W	D	L	GF	GA	GD	Pts	W	D	L	GF	GA	GD	W	D	L	GF	GA	GD
22	12	7	3	38	23	+15	43	7	1	2	16	8	+8	5	6	1	22	15	+7

=== Results by round ===
Win Draw Loss

Round	1	2	3	4	5	6	7	8	9	10	11	12	13	14	15	16	17	18	19	20	21	22
Ground	A	H	A	H	A	A	H	A	A	H	A	H	A	A	H	A	H	H	H	H	A	H
Result	1–1	0–2	2–2	3–0	1–1	3–3	3–1	0–0	2–2	1–0	2–3	2–1	2–0	2–1	3–2	2–0	0–1	1–1	1–0	1–0	2–0	4–2

=== Al-Nassr Standing in 2008–2009 League ===
Last Updated 2010–1–20
Team		Pts	G	W	D	L	GF	GA	GD
2<	Al-Ittihad	45	22	14	3	5	46	30	+16
3	Al-Nassr	43	22	12	7	3	38	23	+15
4	Al-Shabab	40	22	11	7	4	36	23	+13
Pts – points earned; G – games played; W – wins; D – draws; L – losses; GF – goals for; GA – goals against; GD – goal differential

== Crown Prince Cup ==
=== Round of 16 ===
4 February 2010	Al-Raed	0–2	Al-Nassr	King Abdullah Stadium, Buraidah
20:10		(Report)	Ghaly 65'; Ghaly 84'

=== Quarterfinal ===
10 February 2010	Al-Hilal	2–1	Al-Nassr	King Fahd Stadium, Riyadh
20:15	Neves 61'; Wilhelmsson 113'		Pascal 56'

== Saudi Federation cup ==
=== Group stage ===
Kickoff times are in GMT+3.

2 September 2009	Al-Nassr	9–0	Al-Watani	Faisal bin Fahd, Riyadh
22:15	Bernaoy 13'; Ghaleb 35' 39'; Homoud 36'; Al-Zylaeei 42'; Al-Harthi 66' 76'; Al-Sahlawi 80'; Al-Sufyani 91' (pen.)	(Report)

8 September 2009	Al-Shabab	2–3	Al-Nassr	Shabab Club Stadium, Riyadh
22:15	Al-Mowalad 5'; Al-Sultan 26'	(Report)	Al-Sahlawi 54' 63'; Al-Harthi 83'

3 October 2009	Al-Nassr	3–0	Al-Riyadh	Al-Nasr Club Stadium, Riyadh
15:30	Bahri 8'; Thakafi 86'; Belal 90' (pen.)	(Report)

11 October 2009	Al-Hilal	2–1	Al-Nassr	Faisal bin Fahd, Riyadh
20:45	Abeid 34'; Dosari 75'	(Report)	Al-Sahlawi 53'

7 November 2009	Al-Watani	3–1	Al-Nassr	King Khalid, Tabuk
19:45	Otaibi 11'; Abo Robe 60'; Jokami 75'	(Report)	Abbas 47'

15 November 2009	Al-Nassr	2–4	Al-Shabab	Al-Nasr Club Stadium, Riyadh
19:35	Al-Zylaeei 52'; Al-Garnei 76'		Majrashi 6' (pen.) 18' (pen.) 82' (pen.); Fisal Bin Sultan 71'

18 November 2009	Al-Nassr	4–2	Al-Shoalah	Al-Nasr Club Stadium, Riyadh
19:45	Hazzazi 1'; Bernaoy 60'; Belal 78'; Al-Sahlawi 85' (pen.)	(Report)	Mesfer Al-Beashi 2'; Ahmed Al-Zahrani 90' (pen.)

6 December 2009	Al-Riyadh	1–2	Al-Nassr	Riyadh Club Stadium, Riyadh
19:35	Enazi 90'	(Report)	Al-Sahlawi 6' (pen.) 64'

12 December 2009	Al-Nassr	2–2	Al-Hilal	Faisal bin Fahd, Riyadh
19:35	Al-Sahlawi 54' (pen.); Belal 80'	(Report)	Al-Faraj 5'; Shafi 31'

26 December 2009	Al-Shoalah	3–0	Al-Nassr	Shoalah Club Stadium, Al Kharj
19:35	Hamdan 28'; Ajlan 77' 94'	(Report)

=== Group A Standing ===
Last Updated 2009-12-27
Team		Pts	G	W	D	L	GF	GA	GD
1	Al-Shabab	22	10	7	1	2	20	12	+8
2	Al-Hilal	20	10	6	2	2	21	11	+10
3	Al-Nassr	16	10	5	1	4	27	19	+8
4	Al-Watani	13	10	4	1	5	23	31	-8
5	Al-Shoalah	10	10	3	1	6	14	19	-5
6	Al-Riyadh	5	10	1	2	7	6	19	-13
Pts – points earned; G – games played; W – wins; D – draws; L – losses; GF – goals for; GA – goals against; GD – goal differential

Teams qualified to the quarter finals

== Gulf Club Champions Cup ==
=== Group stage ===
Kickoff times are in GMT+3.

15 September 2009	Sur (Oman)	1–2	(Saudi Arabia) Al-Nassr	Sur Stadium, Oman
20:30	Al-Mokaini 5'	(Report)	Al-Sahlawi 37'; Belal 61'

19 October 2009	Al-Nassr (Saudi Arabia)	2–2	(Oman) Sur	King Fahd Stadium, Riyadh
19:50	Zylaeei 25'; Harthi 55'	(Report)	Daoodi 39'; Oraimi 65'

27 October 2009	Al-Nassr (Saudi Arabia)	3–1	(Qatar) Al Khor	King Fahd Stadium, Riyadh
19:45	Hazzazi 4'; Éder 16'; Harthi 78'	(Report)	Ballan 39'

25 November 2009	Al Khor (Qatar)	0–4	(Saudi Arabia) Al-Nassr	Al-Khawr Stadium, Qatar
17:30		(Report)	Homoud 15'; Soo 50'; Figueroa 63'; Zylaeei 74'

=== Group A Standing ===
Last Updated 2009-12-09
Team		Pts	G	W	D	L	GF	GA	GD
1	(Saudi Arabia) Al-Nassr	10	4	3	1	0	11	4	+7
2	(Oman) Sur	4	4	1	1	2	4	5	-1
3	(Qatar) Al Khor	3	4	1	0	3	2	8	-6
Pts – points earned; G – games played; W – wins; D – draws; L – losses; GF – goals for; GA – goals against; GD – goal differential

Teams qualified to the semifinals

=== Semi-final ===
==== First leg ====
25 March 2010	Al-Nassr (Saudi Arabia)	3–1	(United Arab Emirates) Al Wasl	King Fahd Stadium, Riyadh
19:00

==== Second leg ====
30 March 2010	Al Wasl (United Arab Emirates)	–	(Saudi Arabia) Al-Nassr	Zabeel Stadium, Dubai
18:00

== Goal scorers ==
Position	Nation	Number	Name	League	King Cup	CP Cup	FED. Cup	Gulf Cup	Total
1	(Saudi Arabia)	10	Mohammad Al-Sahlawi	11	0	0	8	1	20
2	(Argentina)	8	Víctor Figueroa	9	0	0	0	1	10
3	(Saudi Arabia)	11	Saad Al-Harthi	2	0	0	3	2	7
4	(Saudi Arabia)	15	Ryan Belal	2	0	0	3	1	6
5	(Saudi Arabia)	25	Khaled Al-Zylaeei	0	0	0	2	2	4
5	(South Korea)	7	Lee Chun-Soo	3	0	0	0	1	4
7	(Guinea)	14	Pascal Feindouno	2	0	1	0	0	3
7	(Egypt)	14	Hossam Ghaly	1	0	2	0	0	3
7	(Saudi Arabia)	27	Abdullah Al-Garnei	2	0	0	1	0	3
7	(Saudi Arabia)	24	Hussein Sulaimani	3	0	0	0	0	3
7	(Saudi Arabia)	6	Ahmad Abbas	2	0	0	1	0	3
12	(Saudi Arabia)	16	Ibrahim Ghaleb	0	0	0	2	0	2
12	(Saudi Arabia)	3	Abdoh Bernaoy	0	0	0	2	0	2
12	(Saudi Arabia)	2	Majed Hazzazi	0	0	0	1	1	2
12	(Saudi Arabia)	17	Saud Homoud	0	0	0	1	1	2
16	(Saudi Arabia)	15	Turki Al-Sufyani	0	0	0	1	0	1
16	(Saudi Arabia)	5	Ahmad Al-Bahri	0	0	0	1	0	1
16	(Saudi Arabia)	30	Mansour Al-Thakafi	0	0	0	1	0	1
16	(Brazil)	20	Éder Gaúcho	0	0	0	0	1	1
/	/	/	Own Goal	1	0	0	0	0	1
/	/	/	TOTAL	37	0	3	27	11	78

== Under 20 Team ==
=== Results ===
19 November 2009	Al-Ta'ee	2–1	Al-Nassr	Hail Stadium, Ha'il
15:15

4 December 2009	Al-Nassr	1–0	Al-Wahda	Al-Nassr Stadium, Riyadh
15:15

10 December 2009	Al-Ettifaq	2–1	Al-Nassr	Al-Ettifaq Stadium, Dammam
15:00

18 December 2009	Al-Nassr	0–1	Al-Shabab	Al-Nassr Stadium, Riyadh
15:15

25 December 2009	Hettien	0–1	Al-Nassr	Hettien Stadium, Jizan
15:15

1 January 2010	Al-Nassr	1–1	Ar'ar	Al-Nassr Stadium, Riyadh
15:15

8 January 2010	Najran	0–1	Al-Nassr	Al-Ukhdood Stadium, Najran
15:15

15 January 2010	Al-Nassr	0–1	Al-Ahli	Al-Nassr Stadium, Riyadh
15:15

21 January 2010	Al-Ittihad	–	Al-Nassr	Ittihad Club Stadium, Jeddah
15:15

=== Results by round ===
Win Draw Loss

Round	1	2	3	4	5	6	7	8	9	10	11	12	13	14	15	16	17	18	19	20	21	22
Ground	A	H	A	H	A	H	A	H	A	H	A	H	A	H	A	H	A	H	A	H	A	H
Result	1–2	1–0	1–2	0–1	1–0	1–1	1–0	0–1														

=== Al-Nasr Standing ===
Last Updated 2010–1–16
Team		Pts	G	W	D	L	GF	GA	GD
7	Al-Nasr	10	8	3	1	4	6	7	-1
Pts – points earned; G – games played; W – wins; D – draws; L – losses; GF – goals for; GA – goals against; GD – goal differential

== Under 17 Team ==
=== Results ===
7 November 2009	Al-Shabab	1–2	Al-Nassr	Shabab Club Stadium, Riyadh
15:15		(Report)

12 November 2009	Al-Nassr	–	Hettien	Al-Nasr Club Stadium, Riyadh
Postponed

18 November 2009	Al-Ittihad	0–1	Al-Nassr	Ittihad Club Stadium, Riyadh
15:15		(Report)

11 December 2009	Al-Nassr	1–0	Al-Watani	Al-Nasr Club Stadium, Riyadh
15:15

17 December 2009	Al-Ta'ee	1–1	Al-Nassr	Hail Stadium, Ha'il
15:15

25 December 2009	Al-Nassr	1–0	Al-Ettifaq	Al-Nasr Club Stadium, Riyadh
15:15

31 December 2009	Al-Nassr	0–1	Al-Hilal	Faisal bin Fahd, Riyadh
15:15

7 January 2010	Al-Ahli	2–1	Al-Nassr	Ahli Club Stadium, Jeddah
15:15

14 January 2010	Al-Nassr	3–1	Al-Khaleej	Al-Nasr Club Stadium, Riyadh
15:15

20 January 2010	Al-Ansar	0–2	Al-Nassr	Ansar Club Stadium, Medina
15:15

=== Results by round ===
Win Draw Loss

Round	1	2	3	4	5	6	7	8	9	10	11	12	13	14	15	16	17	18	19	20	21	22
Ground	A	H	A	H	A	H	H	A	H	A	H	H	A	H	A	H	A	A	H	A	H	A
Result	2–1		1–0	1–0	1–1	1–0	0–1	1–2	3–1	2–0												

=== Al-Nasr Standing ===
Last Updated 2010–1–21
Team		Pts	G	W	D	L	GF	GA	GD
3	Al-Nasr	19	9	6	1	2	12	6	+6
Pts – points earned; G – games played; W – wins; D – draws; L – losses; GF – goals for; GA – goals against; GD – goal differential
