= 2017 Saudi Crown Prince Cup final =

- Event: 2016–17 Saudi Crown Prince Cup
Al-Ittihad	Al-Nassr
1	0
- Date: 10 March 2017
- Venue: King Fahd International Stadium, Riyadh
- Referee: Mark Clattenburg (England)
- Attendance: 57,584
- Weather: Partly cloudy 24 °C (75 °F); 18% humidity

The 2017 Saudi Crown Prince Cup final was the 42nd and last final of the Crown Prince Cup. It took place on 10 March 2017 at the King Fahd International Stadium in Riyadh, Saudi Arabia and was contested between Al-Ittihad and Al-Nassr. It was Al-Ittihad's 12th Crown Prince Cup final and first since 2007 and Al-Nassr's 7th final. This was the second meeting between these two clubs in the final with Al-Ittihad winning in 1991.

Al-Ittihad won the match 1–0 and secured their 8th Crown Prince Cup title.

== Teams ==
Team	Previous finals appearances (bold indicates winners)
Al-Ittihad	11 (**1958**, **1959**, **1963**, 1965, **1991**, 1993, **1997**, **2001**, 2002, **2004**, 2007)
Al-Nassr	6 (**1973**, **1974**, 1991, 1996, 2013, **2014**)

== Venue ==
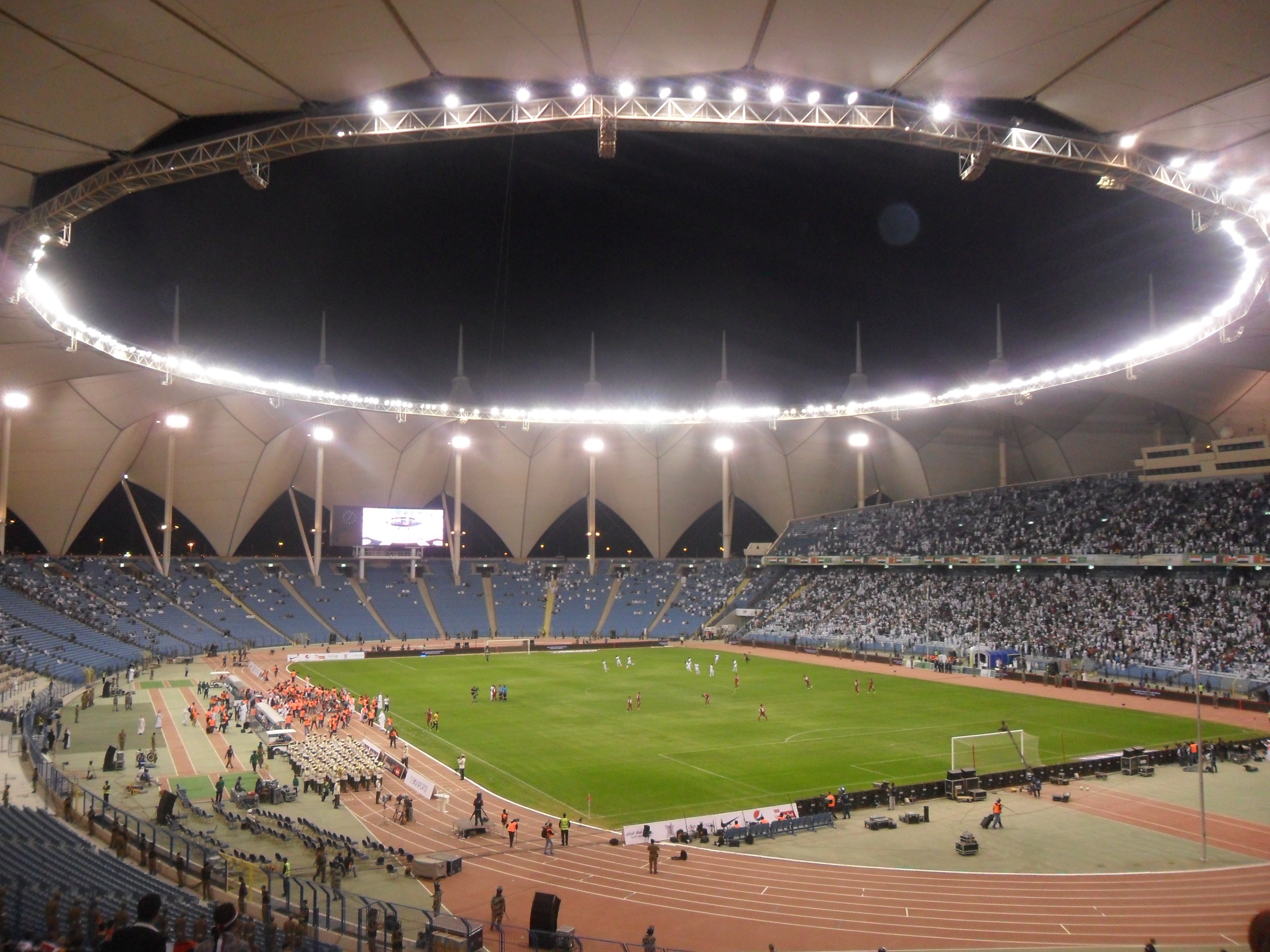
The King Fahd International Stadium in Riyadh hosted the final

On 27 January 2015, the King Fahd International Stadium was announced as the host of the final venue. This was the 15th Crown Prince Cup final hosted in the King Fahd International Stadium following those in 1992, 1994, 1998, 2003, 2004, 2005, 2006, 2008, 2009, 2010, 2012, 2013, 2014, 2015 and 2016.

The King Fahd International Stadium was built in 1982 and was opened in 1987. The stadium was used as a venue for the 1992, 1995, and the 1997 editions of the FIFA Confederations Cup. Its current capacity is 68,752 and it is used by the Saudi Arabia national football team, Al-Nassr, Al-Shabab, and major domestic matches.

== Background ==
Al-Ittihad reached their 12th final after a 3–2 win against derby rivals Al-Ahli. This was Al-Ittihad's first final since 2007. Previously, they won finals in 1958, 1959, 1963, 1991, 1997, 2001, and 2004, and lost in 1965, 1993, 2002 and 2007.

Al-Nassr reached their seventh final, after a 2–0 win against derby rivals and title holdersAl-Hilal. They reached their first final since 2014. Previously, they won finals in 1973, 1974, and 2014, and lost in 1991, 1996, and 2013. This was the first final since 2001 that did not feature either Al-Ahli or Al-Hilal.

The two teams played each other once in the season prior to the final. The match ended in a 1–0 win for Al-Nassr.

== Road to the final ==
Al-Ittihad		Round	Al-Nassr
Opponent	Result		Opponent	Result
Al-Jeel	3–2 (H)	Preliminary round	Al-Nojoom	3–0 (H)
Al-Qadisiyah	1–1 (8–7 p) (H)	Round of 16	Al-Watani	3–1 (A)
Al-Batin	1–0 (A)	Quarter-finals	Al-Wehda	1–0 (H)
Al-Ahli	3–2 (H)	Semi-finals	Al-Hilal	2–0 (A)

Key: (H) = Home; (A) = Away

== Match ==
=== Details ===
10 March 2017
20:35 UTC+3

Al-Ittihad	1–0	Al-Nassr
Kahraba 16'	Report

King Fahd International Stadium, Riyadh
Attendance: 57,584
Referee: Mark Clattenburg (England)

**Al-Ittihad**	**Al-Nassr**

GK	22	(Saudi Arabia) Fawaz Al-Qarni
RB	32	(Saudi Arabia) Omar Al-Muziel		(substituted off) 71'
CB	13	(Saudi Arabia) Ahmed Assiri
CB	33	(Saudi Arabia) Yassin Hamzah
LB	19	(Saudi Arabia) Adnan Fallatah (c)	(yellow card) 56'	(substituted off) 60'
DM	11	(Kuwait) Fahad Al Ansari
DM	15	(Saudi Arabia) Jamal Bajandouh
RW	38	(Saudi Arabia) Ammar Al-Najjar		(substituted off) 67'
AM	23	(Chile) Carlos Villanueva
LW	10	(Egypt) Kahraba
CF	9	(Tunisia) Ahmed Akaïchi	(yellow card) 90+4'
Substitutes:
GK	25	(Saudi Arabia) Hani Al-Nahedh
DF	2	(Saudi Arabia) Abdulrahman Al-Rio
DF	16	(Saudi Arabia) Mohammed Qassem		(substituted in) 60'
DF	27	(Saudi Arabia) Awadh Khrees	(yellow card) 74'	(substituted in) 71'
MF	6	(Saudi Arabia) Khaled Al-Sumairi		(substituted in) 67'
MF	14	(Saudi Arabia) Moataz Tombakti
FW	26	(Saudi Arabia) Abdulaziz Al-Aryani
Manager:
(Chile) José Luis Sierra

GK	22	(Saudi Arabia) Abdullah Al-Enezi
RB	12	(Saudi Arabia) Khalid Al-Ghamdi
CB	4	(Saudi Arabia) Omar Hawsawi	(yellow card) 67'
CB	2	(Brazil) Bruno Uvini	(yellow card) 90+5'
LB	24	(Saudi Arabia) Hussein Abdulghani (c)
DM	14	(Saudi Arabia) Ibrahim Ghaleb
DM	27	(Saudi Arabia) Awadh Khamis
RW	8	(Saudi Arabia) Yahya Al-Shehri
AM	20	(Paraguay) Víctor Ayala		(substituted off) 46'
LW	11	(Croatia) Marin Tomasov		(substituted off) 80'
CF	10	(Saudi Arabia) Mohammad Al-Sahlawi
Substitutes:
GK	23	(Saudi Arabia) Hussain Shae'an
DF	3	(Saudi Arabia) Abdullah Madu
MF	5	(Croatia) Ivan Tomečak
MF	15	(Saudi Arabia) Ahmed Al-Fraidi		(substituted in) 46'
MF	26	(Saudi Arabia) Shaye Sharahili
FW	9	(Saudi Arabia) Naif Hazazi
FW	99	(Saudi Arabia) Hassan Al-Raheb		(substituted in) 80'
Manager:
(France) Patrice Carteron

Assistant referees:
Fahad Al-Amri
Ahmed Al-Fakihi
Fourth official:
Saleh Al-Hathlool

**Match rules**

- 90 minutes.
- 30 minutes of extra-time if necessary.
- Penalty shoot-out if scores still level.
- Seven named substitutes.
- Maximum of three substitutions.

==== Statistics ====
Overall
Statistic	Al-Ittihad	Al-Nassr
Goals scored	1	0
Total shots	14	21
Shots on target	6	6
Blocked shots	1	5
Ball possession	46%	54%
Corner kicks	3	9
Fouls committed	16	6
Offsides	5	3
Yellow cards	3	2
Red cards	0	0

== See also ==
- 2016–17 Saudi Crown Prince Cup
- 2016–17 Saudi Professional League
- 2017 King Cup
