= 2010–11 Al-Nassr FC season =

Al Nassr FC
2010–11 season
- Chairman: Prince Faisal Bin Turki Bin Nasser
- Manager: Walter Zenga/Dragan Skočić
- Stadium: King Fahd Stadium and Prince Faisal bin Fahd Stadium
- 2010-11 ZPL: 5th
- 2011 AFC Champions League: Round of 16
- Crown Prince Cup: Semi-final
- 2011 King Cup of Champions: Quarter-finals
- Saudi Federation Cup: 3rd
- Top goalscorer: League: Ryan Belal (7); All: Saud Hamood (11)
- Highest home attendance: 18058
- Lowest home attendance: 1603
| Home colours | Away colours | Third colours |

The 2010–11 season was Al-Nassr's 35th consecutive season in the top flight of Saudi football and 55th year in existence as a football club.

== Competitions ==
=== 2010-11 Saudi Professional League ===
==== Results summary ====
| Overall | | | | | | | | Home | | | | | | Away | | | | | |
| Pld | W | D | L | GF | GA | GD | Pts | W | D | L | GF | GA | GD | W | D | L | GF | GA | GD |
|---|---|---|---|---|---|---|---|---|---|---|---|---|---|---|---|---|---|---|---|
| 26 | 11 | 10 | 5 | 44 | 34 | +10 | 43 | 7 | 4 | 2 | 24 | 14 | +10 | 4 | 6 | 3 | 20 | 20 | 0 |

Last updated: 2 September.
Source: Competitive Matches

==== Results by round ====
| Round | 1 | 2 | 3 | 4 | 5 | 6 | 7 | 8 | 9 | 10 | 11 | 12 | 13 | 14 | 15 | 16 | 17 | 18 | 19 | 20 | 21 | 22 | 23 | 24 | 25 | 26 |
|---|---|---|---|---|---|---|---|---|---|---|---|---|---|---|---|---|---|---|---|---|---|---|---|---|---|---|
| Ground | A | H | A | H | A | A | H | A | H | A | H | H | A | A | H | H | A | H | H | H | A | A | H | A | H | A |
| Result | W | W | D | D | D | W | L | D | W | D | W | W | D | W | D | D | L | W | D | W | W | D | L | L | W | L |
| Position | 6 | 1 | 4 | 5 | 4 | 3 | 4 | 4 | 3 | 4 | 3 | 3 | 4 | 3 | 3 | 3 | 4 | 3 | 4 | 3 | 3 | 3 | 3 | 5 | 4 | 5 |

Updated to match(es) played on 20 May. Source: slstat.com
A = Away; H = Home; W = Win; D = Draw; L = Loss

==== Matches ====
Kickoff times are in AST (UTC+3).

| 14 August 2010 Round 1 | Najran | 0 - 1 | Al Nassr | Al-Ukhdood Stadium, Najran |
| 22:00 AST | Abdullah Rasan (yellow card) 33' (red card) 90+1'; Fahad Adawi (yellow card) 69'; Abdul-Aziz Al-Hamsal (yellow card) 86' | (Report) | Mohamed Eid (yellow card) 59'; Ovidiu Petre 83' | Attendance: 2335; Referee: Saad Al-Kathiri (سعد الكثيري) |

| 19 August 2010 Round 2 | Al Nassr | 4 - 2 | Al Fateh | Prince Faisal bin Fahd Stadium, Riyadh |
| 22:00 AST | Ibrahim Ghaleb 4'; Saad Al-Harthi (yellow card) 33'; Ovidiu Petre (yellow card) 43'; Mohammad Al-Sahlawi 42', 77'; Khaled Al-Zylaeei 89'; Ahmed Dokhi (yellow card) 90+1' | (Report) | Ramzi Ben Younès (yellow card) 20'; Ahmed Boabeed (yellow card) 24'; Ahmed Mubarak Al Mahaijri (yellow card) 48'; Fesal Seef 57'; Rabeaa Sefiani 60'; Jaber Hagawi (yellow card) 83' | Attendance: 13126; Referee: Meree Al-Awagi (مرعي العواجي) |

| 24 August 2010 Round 3 | Al Taawon | 2 - 2 | Al Nassr | King Abdullah Sport City Stadium, Buraidah |
| 22:15 AST | Saad Al-Harthi 90+1'; Ibrahim Ghaleb (yellow card) 90+1'; Mohammad Al-Sahlawi 90+2' | (Report) | bader Al-khamees 76'; Ali Al-Turki (yellow card) 85'; Mubrik Al-Mubrik (yellow card) 86'; Amir Azmi (yellow card) 87' (red card) 90+7'; Naif Al-Karri (yellow card) 90+5'; Mohammed Al-Rashed 90+5' (yellow card) 90+6' | Attendance: 12707; Referee: Abbas Ibrahim (عباس ابراهيم) |

| 28 August 2010 Round 4 | Al Nassr | 0 - 0 | Al Shabab | King Fahd International Stadium, Riyadh |
| 22:00 AST |

| 16 September 2010 Round 5 | Al Faisaly | 1 - 1 | Al Nassr | Prince Salman Bin Abdulaziz Sport City Stadium, Al Majma'ah |
| 20:20 AST |

| 23 September 2010 Round 6 | Al Qadisiyah | 1 - 3 | Al Nassr | Prince Saud bin Jalawi Stadium, Khobar |
| 20:15 AST |

| 28 September 2010 Round 7 | Al Nassr | 0 - 1 | Al Wehda | King Fahd International Stadium, Riyadh |
| 22:10 AST |

| 2 October 2010 Round 8 | Al Raed | 1 - 1 | Al Nassr | King Abdullah Sport City Stadium, Buraidah |
| 22:05 AST |

=== 2011 AFC Champions League ===
==== Group stage ====
| Team | Pld | W | D | L | GF | GA | GD | Pts |
|---|---|---|---|---|---|---|---|---|
| (Qatar) Al-Sadd | 6 | 2 | 4 | 0 | 8 | 6 | +2 | 10 |
| (Saudi Arabia) Al-Nassr | 6 | 2 | 2 | 2 | 10 | 7 | +3 | 8 |
| (Iran) Esteghlal | 6 | 2 | 2 | 2 | 11 | 10 | +1 | 8 |
| (Uzbekistan) Pakhtakor | 6 | 1 | 2 | 3 | 8 | 14 | −6 | 5 |

| 1 March 2011 Round 1 | Pakhtakor (Uzbekistan) | 2 – 2 | (Saudi Arabia) Al-Nassr | Pakhtakor Markaziy Stadium, Tashkent |
| 17:00 UTC+05:00 | Karimov 45'; Sharofetdinov 61' | Report | Al-Mutwa 51'; Miladinović 88' (o.g.) | Attendance: 15,000; Referee: Minoru Tojo (Japan) |

| 15 March 2011 Round 2 | Al-Nassr (Saudi Arabia) | 2 – 1 | (Iran) Esteghlal | King Fahd International Stadium, Riyadh |
| 20:30 UTC+03:00 | Sulaimani 60'; Al-Harthi 81' | Report | Omranzadeh 21' | Attendance: 12,878; Referee: Abdullah Al Hilali (Oman) |

| 5 April 2011 Round 3 | Al-Sadd (Qatar) | 1 – 0 | (Saudi Arabia) Al-Nassr | Jassim Bin Hamad Stadium, Doha |
| 18:15 UTC+03:00 | Lee Jung-Soo 61' | Report | | Attendance: 8,603; Referee: Mohamed Al Zarooni (UAE) |

| 19 April 2011 Round 4 | Al-Nassr (Saudi Arabia) | 1 – 1 | (Qatar) Al-Sadd | King Fahd International Stadium, Riyadh |
| 20:40 UTC+03:00 | Sulaimani 75' | Report | Siddiq 37' | Attendance: 18,421; Referee: Tan Hai (China PR) |

| 4 May 2011 Round 5 | Al-Nassr (Saudi Arabia) | 4 – 0 | (Uzbekistan) Pakhtakor | King Fahd International Stadium, Riyadh |
| 20:45 UTC+03:00 | Hamood 8'; Al-Mutwa 24', 65'; Al-Sahlawi 61' | Report | | Attendance: 4,034; Referee: Peter Green (Australia) |

| 11 May 2011 Round 6 | Esteghlal (Iran) | 2 – 1 | (Saudi Arabia) Al-Nassr | Azadi Stadium, Tehran |
| 18:00 UTC+04:30 | Majidi 62'; Hawar 89' | Report | Al-Mutwa 60' | Attendance: 85,422; Referee: Maasaki Toma (Japan) |

==== Knockout stage ====
| 25 May 2011 Round of 16 | Zob Ahan (Iran) | 4 – 1 | (Saudi Arabia) Al-Nassr | Foolad Shahr Stadium, Isfahan |
| 19:15 UTC+04:30 | Ghazi 1'; Castro 5', 63'; Kheiri 74' | Report | Al-Mutwa 66' | Attendance: 5,711; Referee: Choi Myung-Yong (Korea Republic) |

=== 2011 King Cup of Champions ===
| 29 May 2011 First Leg | Al Nassr | 3 - 3 | Al Ittihad | King Fahd International Stadium, Riyadh |
| 21:00 AST |

| 10 June 2011 Second Leg | Al Ittihad | 1 - 1 (4a – 4 agg.) | Al Nassr | Prince Abdullah al-Faisal Stadium, Jeddah |
| 20:35 |

=== 2010-11 Saudi Crown Prince Cup ===
==== Matches ====
| 3 February 2011 Round of 16 | Al Nassr | 5 - 1 | Al Qadisiyah | Prince Faisal bin Fahd Stadium, Riyadh |
| 20:10 AST |

| 17 February 2011 Quarter-finals | Al Riyadh | 1 - 2 | Al Nassr | King Fahd International Stadium, Riyadh |
| 20:15 AST |

| 10 March 2011 Semi-finals | Al Nassr | 0 - 2 | Al Hilal | King Fahd International Stadium, Riyadh |
| 20:35 AST |
