= Ali Al-Abdali =

Saudi Arabian footballer

Personal information
- Full name: Ali Al-Abdali
- Date of birth: February 5, 1979 (age 47)
- Place of birth: Saudi Arabia
- Height: 1.76 m (5 ft 9 1/2 in)
- Position: Defender

Youth career
- Al-Ahli

Senior career*
Years	Team	Apps	(Gls)
1998–2008	Al-Ahli		
2008–2009	Al-Raed	7	(0)
2009–2010	Al-Qadsiah	16	(0)
2010–2011	Al-Ansar		
2011–2014	Al-Rabe'e		

International career
2004	Saudi Arabia	2	(0)
- * Club domestic league appearances and goals

Ali Al-Abdali (Arabic: علي العبدلي; born 5 February 1979) is a former Saudi Arabian footballer who played as a defender. He spent the majority of his career at Al-Ahli and he also played for Al-Raed, Al-Qadsiah, Al-Ansar, and Al-Rabe'e. He played for the Saudi Arabia national team in the 2004 AFC Asian Cup.

== Honours ==
Al-Ahli

- Crown Prince Cup: 2001–02, 2006–07
- Federation Cup: 2000–01, 2001–02, 2006–07
- Arab Unified Club Championship: 2002–03
- Gulf Club Champions Cup: 2002, 2008
