= Hussein Abdulghani =

Saudi Arabian footballer (born 1977)

Hussein Abdulghani حُسَيْن عَبْد الْغَنِيّ
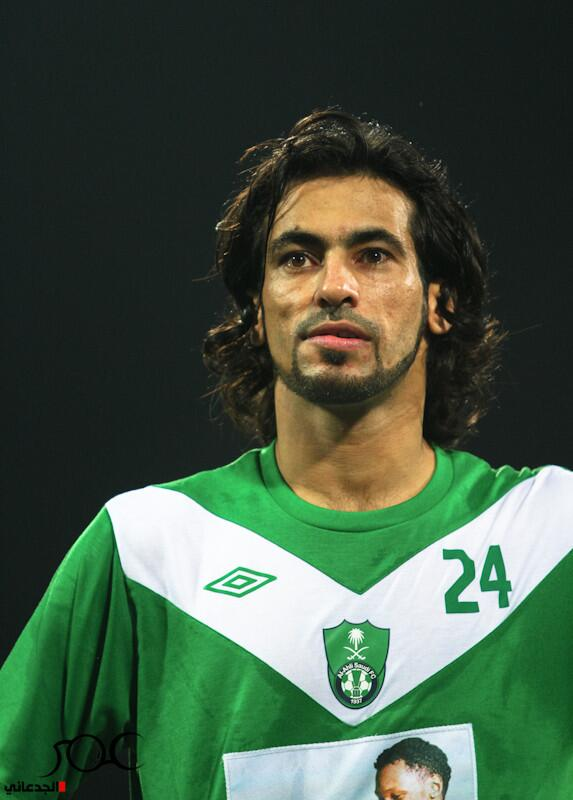
- Hussein Abdel-Ghani in the Al-Ahli club shirt

Personal information
- Full name: Hussein Omar Abdulghani Sulaimani
- Date of birth: 21 January 1977 (age 49)
- Place of birth: Jeddah, Saudi Arabia
- Height: 1.74 m (5 ft 8 1/2 in)
- Position: Left-back

Youth career
- 1992–1995: Al-Ahli

Senior career*
Years	Team	Apps	(Gls)
1995–2008	Al-Ahli	287	(30)
2007	→ Al-Rayyan SC (loan)	1	(0)
2008–2009	Neuchâtel Xamax	21	(0)
2009–2017	Al-Nassr	205	(9)
2017–2018	Vereya	14	(0)
2018–2019	Ohod	11	(1)
2019–2020	Al-Ahli	29	(0)
Total		568	(40)

International career^{‡}
1996–2018	Saudi Arabia	138	(5)
- * Club domestic league appearances and goals as of 19:13, 17 September 2020 (UTC) ‡ National team caps and goals as of 20:56, 20 November 2018 (UTC)

Hussein Omar Abdulghani Sulaimani (Arabic: حُسَيْن عُمَر عَبْد الْغَنِيّ سُلَيْمَانِيّ; born 21 January 1977) is a Saudi Arabian former professional footballer who played as a left-back in the Saudi Professional League.

== Club career ==
=== Al-Ahli ===
Abdulghani began his career at Al-Ahli, joining the youth team in 1992. He originally started his career as a forward but was moved to full-back, a position he would mainly play at for the remainder of his career, by Amin Dabo, the youth team manager at the time. Abdulghani made his Al-Ahli debut on 26 September 1995 in a Federation Cup tie with Al-Qadsiah. The match ended in a 2–1 loss.

On 25 November 1995, Abdulghani made his league in the derby match against Al-Ittihad that ended in a 2–1 win. He made 24 appearances in all competitions in his first season with the club as Al-Ahli finished runners-up in the league. In his second season, Abdulghani missed matches for Al-Ahli due to the national team's participation in the 1996 AFC Asian Cup. On 25 December 1997, Abdulghani scored his first league goal for the club against Al-Wehda. On 11 March 1998, Abdulghani started the Crown Prince Cup final against Al-Riyadh and provided the assist for Masaad's golden goal in the 97th minute, as Al-Ahli won their third Crown Prince Cup title. This was Al-Ahli's first silverware since 1985. On 15 November 1999, Abdulghani made his continental debut for Al-Ahli against Syrian side Al-Jaish in the 1999–2000 Asian Cup Winners' Cup.

Abdulghani missed most of the 2001–02 season with Al-Ahli through injury after injuring his anterior cruciate ligament while on international duty. He was substituted in the 84th minute in the 2002 FIFA World Cup qualification match against Thailand on 21 October 2001. He made his return on 15 March 2002 in the Gulf Club Champions Cup match against Emirati side Al-Shabab. On 22 March 2002, Abdulghani started in the 2–0 win against Omani side Dhofar as Al-Ahli won their second Gulf Club Champions Cup. On 27 December 2002, Abdulghani was suspended for six matches for comments he made towards the referee, Mamdouh Al-Mirdas, following the loss against Al-Hilal. On 3 February 2003, Abdulghani started the Arab Unified Club Championship final against Tunisian side Club Africain as Al-Ahli won their first Arab title.

Following the retirement of Mohammed Al-Jahani, Abdulghani was named as the club captain starting from the 2004–05 season. His first final as club captain ended in a loss in the 2005 Federation Cup final against Al-Hilal. Six months later, Abdulghani also captained the side in the 2006 Crown Prince Cup final loss against Al-Hilal as well. On 9 February 2007, Abdulghani captained Al-Ahli as they won their third Federation Cup, defeating derby rivals Al-Ittihad in the final by 3–0 at the Prince Abdullah Al-Faisal Stadium. Two months later, on 27 April 2007, Abdulghani captained Al-Ahli as they won their fifth Crown Prince Cup title, defeating derby rivals Al-Ittihad in the final once again.

In May 2007, Abdulghani was loaned to Qatari side Al-Rayyan on a short-term deal. He made one appearance in the Emir of Qatar Cup quarter-finals. Abdulghani missed a penalty in the penalty shoot-outs as Al-Rayyan were eliminated by Al-Arabi. On 4 April 2008, Abdulghani was sent off in the league match against Najran, and was suspended for two matches. On 26 April 2008, his suspension was lifted. On 27 April 2008, Abdulghani made his final appearance for Al-Ahli in the 3–1 loss against Al-Shabab in the 2nd leg of the King Cup quarter-finals.

=== Neuchâtel Xamax ===
On 10 July 2008, Abdulghani joined Swiss based Neuchâtel Xamax on a three-year contract for a reported fee of $1 million. His transfer to Europe had made him the third Saudi footballer to play in Europe, after Sami Al-Jaber and Fahad Al-Ghesheyan and the first to play in the Swiss Super League. He made his debut on 2 August 2008 as a 70th minute in the league match against Aarau. On 17 August 2008, he made his first start for the club against Grasshoppers. He made 21 appearances in all competitions in his only season at the club.

=== Al-Nassr ===
On 3 July 2009, Abdulghani returned to Saudi Arabia and joined Al-Nassr on a three-year contract. This move did not go down well with Al-Ahli supporters, who held up a banner saying "Traitor 24" during the league match between Al-Ahli and Al-Nassr on 22 November 2009. On 25 August 2009, Abdulghani made his debut for Al-Nassr as well as score his first goal in the 1–1 draw against Al-Ettifaq. On 9 February 2010, Abdulghani injured his right knee in the Crown Prince Cup quarter-final match against derby rivals Al-Hilal and was ruled out for the rest of the season. He made 22 appearances and scored 3 goals in all competitions helping Al-Nassr to a 3rd place finish, their highest since 2002. On 10 October 2010, Abdulghani made his return in a friendly match against Al-Diriyah. On 16 October 2010, Abdulghani made his return as a substitute in the 2–1 win against former club Al-Ahli. On 28 September 2011, Abdulghani was suspended for three matches for elbowing former Al-Ahli teammate and Al-Faisaly goalkeeper Tisir Al-Antaif. On 18 May 2012, Abdulghani captained Al-Nassr in the 2012 King Cup final loss to Al-Ahli. On 25 May 2012, Abdulghani renewed his contract with Al-Nassr for another two years. During the 2013-14 season, Abdulghani made 23 appearances and assisted 7 goals in the league helping Al-Nassr win their first league title since 1995. He also captained Al-Nassr to a 2–1 win over derby rivals Al-Hilal in the 2014 Saudi Crown Prince Cup final. Their first Crown Prince Cup title since 1974. On 8 April 2014, Abdulghani renewed his contract with Al-Nassr. On 11 August 2014, Abdulghani was suspended for two matches following an altercation with Abdulmalek Al-Khaibri after a penalty shootout loss in the 2014 Saudi Super Cup. During the 2014–15 season, Abdulghani made 22 appearances, scored twice and assisted three times helping Al-Nassr win a second consecutive league title. On 11 June 2015, Abdulghani was suspended for six matches after an altercation with a fan following the penalty shootout defeat to Al-Hilal in the 2015 King Cup final. On 9 July 2016, Abdulghani renewed his contract with Al-Nassr for two years. On 28 June 2017, Al-Nassr and Abdulghani mutually agreed to release him from his contract.

=== Later career ===
On 13 September 2017, Abdulghani signed a one-year contract with Bulgarian First League club Vereya. Becoming the first Saudi to play in the Bulgarian First League. He hoped to take a chance to play for the Saudi Arabia national team at the 2018 FIFA World Cup in Russia. On 11 June 2018, Abdulghani went back to Saudi Arabia to sign for the newly promoted Pro League side Ohod. In January 2019, he returned to his former club Al-Ahli. On 15 October 2020, Abdulghani announced his retirement.

== International career ==
Abdulghani was a regular member of the Saudi Arabia national team. He was on the national team that won 1996 AFC Asian Cup at age 19. He was selected for the 1998, 2002 and 2006 FIFA World Cups. Abdulghani announced his retirement from international football after failing to lead his national team to the 2010 FIFA World Cup. On 6 October 2018, he received a call-up for a friendly match against Brazil.

== Career statistics ==
=== Club ===
Updated 26 January 2024.

Appearances and goals by club, season and competition
Club	Season	League			National Cup (Note: Includes King Cup, Swiss Cup and Bulgarian Cup)		League Cup (Note: Includes Crown Prince Cup)		Continental		Other		Total	
Club	Season	Division	Apps	Goals	Apps	Goals	Apps	Goals	Apps	Goals	Apps	Goals	Apps	Goals
Al-Ahli	1995–96	SPL	14	0	—		1	0	—		9 (Note: Appearances in Federation Cup)	0	24	0
Al-Ahli	1996–97	SPL	4	0	—		2	0	—		—		6	0
Al-Ahli	1997–98	SPL	10	1	—		3	0	—		3 (Note: Appearances in Arab Club Champions Cup)	0	16	1
Al-Ahli	1998–99	SPL	21	2	—		1	0	—		—		22	2
Al-Ahli	1999–2000	SPL	21	2	—		2	0	3	0	4 (Note: Appearances in Saudi Founder's Cup)	0	30	2
Al-Ahli	2000–01	SPL	14	1	—		2	0	—		3	0	19	1
Al-Ahli	2001–02	SPL	3	0	—		0	0	—		4 (Note: Appearances in GCC Champions League)	0	7	0
Al-Ahli	2002–03	SPL	18	2	—		4	1	2	0	9	0	33	3
Al-Ahli	2003–04	SPL	18	2	—		4	0	—		14	2	36	4
Al-Ahli	2004–05	SPL	12	0	—		1	0	5	2	7	1	25	3
Al-Ahli	2005–06	SPL	11	1	—		2	0	—		8	2	21	3
Al-Ahli	2006–07	SPL	11	1	—		3	0	—		9 (Note: Eight appearances in Arab Club Champions Cup, one appearance in Federation Cup)	0	23	1
Al-Ahli	2007–08	SPL	12	1	1	0	4	1	6	1	3	1	23	3
Al-Ahli	Total		169	13	1	0	29	2	16	3	73	6	288	24
Neuchâtel Xamax	2008–09	SSL	19	0	2	0	—		—		—		21	0
Al-Nassr	2009–10	SPL	17	3	0	0	1	0	—		4 (Note: Three appearances in GCC Champions League, one appearance in Federation Cup)	0	22	3
Al-Nassr	2010–11	SPL	13	0	1	0	2	0	5	2	—		21	2
Al-Nassr	2011–12	SPL	17	0	5	0	2	0	—		—		24	0
Al-Nassr	2012–13	SPL	24	1	2	0	4	0	—		4	0	34	1
Al-Nassr	2013–14	SPL	23	0	1	0	4	0	—		—		28	0
Al-Nassr	2014–15	SPL	22	2	4	0	2	0	6	0	1 (Note: Appearances in Saudi Super Cup)	0	35	2
Al-Nassr	2015–16	SPL	18	0	5	0	1	0	5	1	0	0	29	1
Al-Nassr	2016–17	SPL	8	0	1	0	3	0	—		—		12	0
Al-Nassr	Total		142	6	19	0	19	0	16	3	9	0	205	9
Vereya	2017–18	BFL	13	0	1	0	—		—		—		14	0
Ohod	2018–19	SPL	11	1	0	0	—		—		—		11	1
Al-Ahli	2018–19	SPL	3	0	2	0	—		7	0	—		12	0
Al-Ahli	2019–20	SPL	10	0	0	0	—		7	0	—		17	0
Al-Ahli	Total		13	0	2	0	0	0	14	0	0	0	29	0
Al-Ahli Total			182	0	3	0	29	2	30	3	73	6	317	24
Career total			367	20	25	0	48	2	46	6	82	6	568	34

=== International ===
As of 20 November 2018

Appearances and goals by national team and year
National team	Year	Apps	Goals
Saudi Arabia	1996	18	0
Saudi Arabia	1997	21	0
Saudi Arabia	1998	22	0
Saudi Arabia	1999	14	2
Saudi Arabia	2000	0	0
Saudi Arabia	2001	17	2
Saudi Arabia	2002	5	0
Saudi Arabia	2003	0	0
Saudi Arabia	2004	4	1
Saudi Arabia	2005	4	0
Saudi Arabia	2006	14	0
Saudi Arabia	2007	3	0
Saudi Arabia	2008	2	0
Saudi Arabia	2009	8	0
Saudi Arabia	2014	2	0
Saudi Arabia	2018	4	0
Total		138	5

==== International goals ====
#	Date	Venue	Opponent	Score	Result	Competition
1	22 June 1999	Prince Sultan bin Abdulaziz Sports City Stadium, Abha, Saudi Arabia	Jordan	2–0	2–1	Friendly
2	9 July 1999	Titan Stadium, Fullerton, United States	Canada	2–0	2–0	Friendly
3	8 February 2001	Prince Mohamed bin Fahd Stadium, Dammam, Saudi Arabia	Mongolia	4–0	6–0	2002 FIFA World Cup qualification
4	8 February 2001	Prince Mohamed bin Fahd Stadium, Dammam, Saudi Arabia	Mongolia	5–0	6–0	2002 FIFA World Cup qualification
5	14 October 2004	Gelora Bung Karno Stadium, Jakarta, Indonesia	Indonesia	2–0	3–1	2006 FIFA World Cup qualification

== Honours ==
Al-Ahli

- Crown Prince Cup: 1998, 2002, 2006–07
- Saudi Federation Cup: 2001, 2002, 2007
- Arab Champions League: 2002–03
- Gulf Club Champions Cup: 2002, 2008
- International Friendship Football Tournament: 2001, 2002

Neuchâtel Xamax FCS

- Swiss Cup - 3rd place

Al-Nassr

- Pro League: 2013–14, 2014–15
- Crown Prince Cup: 2013–14
- Baniyas International Championship: 2011, 2013
- Alwehda International Championship: 2012

OHOD

- Gulf of Aqaba Cup: 2018
- Jordan International Championship: 2018

Saudi Arabia

- Summer Olympic Games: 1996 Summer Olympics
- AFC Asian Cup: 1996
- Arab Nations Cup: 1998, 2002
- Gulf Cup: 2002
- 1997 FIFA Confederations Cup: Group Stage
- 1998 FIFA World Cup: Group Stage
- 1999 FIFA Confederations Cup: 4th Place
- 2002 FIFA World Cup: Group Stage
- 2006 FIFA World Cup: Group Stage

individual

- The best promising Gulf player in 1996.
- Best Arab player in 1997.
- He won the best player award 3 times from 8 matches in the final qualifiers for the World Cup in France, as a record for a player in the defense line.
- He was chosen to play in the Asian Stars team in Moscow in 1998.
- He was chosen to play in the World Stars team in 1997 and 2000 in Marseille.
- He won the SANYO award for the best Asian full back in 2000.
- Best defender in the Arab Clubs Cup in 2003 in Jeddah.
- The best Arab player in the World Cup twice, 1998 AD and 2006.
- He was chosen as the best Saudi football player in 2006.
- The US magazine Esquire chose him as the best international player for teams in the Middle East and North Africa in the first decade of the millennium (2000 - 2009).
- The Best Asian Goal Award for the month of April 2011 from the Asian Confederation.
- Best Saudi Defender of 2014 from Opta.
- Best Professional in Bulgaria in 2018.

== Other prizes ==
- 1997: Saudi Arabia - Al-Ahli Club Golden Shield
- 1998: Morocco - Arab Excellence Award from the Moroccan Arab Sports Magazine
- 2002: Palestine - the shield of the Palestinian Football Association for its support for the Palestinian cause
- 2014: France - Civilization and Excellence Award from the Encyclopedia of Excellence and World Civilization in Paris
- 2017: Qatar - World Cup Ambassador for Orphans in Qatar

== See also ==
- List of men's footballers with 100 or more international caps
