= 2006–07 Saudi Crown Prince Cup =

2006–07 Crown Prince Cup
Tournament details
- Country: Saudi Arabia
- Dates: 30 November 2006 – 27 April 2007
- Teams: 44 (all); 32 (qualifying competition); 16 (main competition)

Final positions
- Champions: Al-Ahli (5th title)
- Runners-up: Al-Ittihad
- AFC Champions League: Al-Ahli

Tournament statistics
- Matches played: 17
- Goals scored: 57 (3.35 per match)
- Top goal scorer(s): Alhassane Keita (6 goals)
- All statistics correct as of 27 April 2007. (Note: All statistics do not include qualifying play-offs)

The 2006–07 Crown Prince Cup was the 32nd season of the Saudi premier knockout tournament since its establishment in 1957. It started with the Qualifying Rounds on 30 November 2006 and concluded with the final on 27 April 2007.

Premier League side Al-Hilal were the defending champions, but they were eliminated by Al-Ahli in the Semi-finals. Al-Ahli won their fifth Crown Prince Cup title and their first since 2002. As winners of the tournament, Al-Ahli qualified for the 2008 AFC Champions League group stage.

== Qualifying rounds ==
All of the competing teams that are not members of the Premier League competed in the qualifying rounds to secure one of 4 available places in the Round of 16. The qualifying competition began on 30 November 2006.

=== First round ===
Source: Al-Jazirah.

| Home team (tier) | Score | Away team (tier) |
Thursday 30 November 2006
| Al-Fayha (2) | 1–0 | Al-Raed (3) |
| Al-Taawoun (2) | 3–1 | Al-Najma (3) |
| Al-Jabalain (2) | 0–0 (3–2 p) | Al-Qotah (3) |
| Sdoos (2) | 3–3 (4–5 p) | Al-Hamadah (3) |
| Al-Riyadh (2) | 3–2 | Al-Taqadom (4) |
| Al-Shoulla (2) | 1–2 | Al-Qarah (4) |
| Al-Orobah (3) | 4–0 | Duba (4) |
| Al-Majd (4) | 0–2 | Al-Watani (2) |
| Al-Nahda (2) | 1–0 | Al-Noor (3) |
| Al-Ansar (2) | 2–2 (2–4 p) | Wej (4) |
| Al-Rabe'e (3) | 1–0 | Ohod (3) |
| Al-Adalah (3) | 1–2 | Hajer (2) |
| Al-Fateh (2) | 1–2 | Al-Oyoon (3) |
| Abha (2) | 1–1 (3–2 p) | Hetten (4) |
| Al-Akhdoud (3) | 2–3 | Damac (2) |
| Al-Tuhami (3) | 0–1 | Najran (2) |

=== Second round ===
| Home team (tier) | Score | Away team (tier) |
Thursday 14 December 2006
| Al-Hamadah (3) | 2–3 | Al-Riyadh (2) |
| Al-Fayha (2) | 1–3 | Al-Taawoun (2) |
| Al-Nahda (2) | 2–0 | Al-Qarah (4) |
| Al-Oyoon (3) | 1–1 (3–2 p) | Hajer (2) |
| Al-Rabe'e (3) | 1–0 | Wej (4) |
| Al-Orobah (3) | 1–3 | Al-Jabalain (2) |
| Najran (2) | 3–2 | Al-Watani (2) |
| Abha (2) | 2–3 | Damac (2) |

=== Final Round ===
| Home team (tier) | Score | Away team (tier) |
Monday 25 December 2006
| Al-Oyoon (3) | 1–2 | Al-Rabe'e (3) |
| Al-Jabalain (2) | 1–1 (4–2 p) | Al-Taawoun (2) |
| Al-Nahda (2) | 0–2 | Al-Riyadh (2) |
| Damac (2) | 1–3 (a.e.t.) | Najran (2) |

== Bracket ==
Round of 16
H | Al-Shabab | 5
A | Al-Rabe'e | 0
A | Al-Ettifaq | 2
H | Al-Khaleej | 1
H | Al-Ittihad | 6
A | Al-Tai | 1
A | Al-Qadisiyah | 1
H | Najran | 2
H | Al-Hilal | 2
A | Al-Wehda | 1
A | Al-Hazem | 2
H | Al-Jabalain | 1
A | Al-Ahli | 3
H | Al-Riyadh | 1
H | Al-Nassr | 1 (4)
A | Al-Faisaly (pen.) | 1 (5)

Quarter-finals
H | Al-Shabab | 0
A | Al-Ettifaq | 1
H | Al-Ittihad | 10
A | Najran | 0
H | Al-Hilal (a.e.t.) | 2
A | Al-Hazem | 0
H | Al-Ahli | 1
A | Al-Faisaly | 0

Semi-finals
A | Al-Ettifaq | 1 | 1 | 2
H | Al-Ittihad | 0 | 4 | 4
A | Al-Hilal | 0 | 1 | 1
H | Al-Ahli | 2 | 1 | 3

Final
– | Al-Ittihad | 1
– | Al-Ahli | 2

== Round of 16 ==
The Round of 16 fixtures were played on 21, 22, 23 and 25 February 2007. All times are local, AST (UTC+3).

| 21 February 2007 1 | Al-Rabe'e (3) | 0–5 | Al-Shabab (1) | Jeddah |
| 20:10 | | Report | Al-Gizani 22'; Abdoh Otaif 27'; Al-Haqbani 42'; Fallatah 47', 85' | Stadium: Prince Abdullah Al-Faisal Stadium; Referee: Abdullah Al-Dubais |

| 21 February 2007 7 | Al-Riyadh (2) | 1–3 | Al-Ahli (1) | Riyadh |
| 20:10 | Al-Dawood 52' | Report | Guemamdia 13'; Caio 85'; Al-Jassim 86' | Stadium: Prince Faisal bin Fahd Stadium; Referee: Mamdouh Al-Mirdas |

| 21 February 2007 8 | Al-Nassr (1) | 1–1 (a.e.t.) (4–5 p) | Al-Faisaly (1) | Riyadh |
| 20:10 | Haroon 83' (pen.) | Report | Al-Fahad 67' | Stadium: King Fahd International Stadium; Referee: Ali Al-Mutlaq |
| | Penalties |
| | Haroon (penalty scored); Al-Sagoor (penalty scored); Al-Salamah (penalty missed); Al-Shahrani (penalty scored); Al-Bishi (penalty scored) | | (penalty scored) Massolin; (penalty scored) Al-Zahrani; (penalty scored) Al-Kaltham; (penalty scored) Cissé; (penalty scored) Al-Mohammadi |

| 22 February 2007 5 | Al-Hilal (1) | 2–1 | Al-Wehda (1) | Riyadh |
| 20:10 | Rodrigão 54' (pen.), 74' | Report | Al-Shamrani 8' (pen.) | Stadium: Prince Faisal bin Fahd Stadium; Referee: César Muñiz Fernández (Spain) |

| 22 February 2007 4 | Najran (2) | 2–1 | Al-Qadisiyah (1) | Najran |
| 20:10 | Al Theiban 19', 47' | Report | Al-Wadani 34' | Stadium: Al Akhdoud Club Stadium |

| 23 February 2007 3 | Al-Ittihad (1) | 6–1 | Al-Tai (1) | Jeddah |
| 20:10 | Keita 12', 71'; Abushgeer 24'; Reinaldo 66', 70'; Al-Saeed 80' | Report | Al-Ghamdi 69' | Stadium: Prince Abdullah Al-Faisal Stadium |

| 23 February 2007 6 | Al-Jabalain (2) | 1–2 | Al-Hazem (1) | Ha'il |
| 20:10 | Al-Moathin 13' | Report | Mabrook 56'; Abdullah 76' | Stadium: Prince Abdul Aziz bin Musa'ed Stadium; Referee: Abdulrahman Al-Amri |

| 25 February 2007 2 | Al-Khaleej (1) | 1–2 | Al-Ettifaq (1) | Dammam |
| 20:10 | Al-Raheb 13' | Report | Al-Qahtani 60'; Al-Rajaa 62' | Stadium: Prince Mohamed bin Fahd Stadium; Referee: Saad Al-Kathairi |

== Quarter-finals ==
The Quarter-finals fixtures were played on 2, 3 and 4 March 2007. All times are local, AST (UTC+3).

| 2 March 2007 9 | Al-Shabab (1) | 0–1 | Al-Ettifaq (1) | Riyadh |
| 20:10 | | Report | Al-Qahtani 74' | Stadium: Prince Faisal bin Fahd Stadium; Referee: Mutraf Al-Qahtani |

| 2 March 2007 11 | Al-Hilal (1) | 2–0 (a.e.t.) | Al-Hazem (1) | Riyadh |
| 20:10 | Al-Jaber 116', 119' | Report | | Stadium: King Fahd International Stadium; Referee: Khalil Al Ghamdi |

| 3 March 2007 10 | Al-Ittihad (1) | 10–0 | Najran (2) | Jeddah |
| 20:10 | Wágner 7', 60'; Kariri 15', 81'; Reinaldo 26'; Keita 28', 65', 70'; Al-Otaibi 59', 86' | Report | | Stadium: Prince Abdullah Al-Faisal Stadium |

| 4 March 2007 12 | Al-Ahli (1) | 1–0 | Al-Faisaly (1) | Jeddah |
| 20:10 | Mouath 43' | Report | | Stadium: Prince Abdullah Al-Faisal Stadium; Referee: Abdullah Al-Jaroon |

== Semi-finals ==
The Semi-finals first legs were played on 18 March and 1 April 2007 while the second legs were played on 5 and 7 April 2007. The first leg of the Al-Ahli v Al-Hilal match up was moved to 18 March due to Al-Ahli's participation in the semi-finals of the 2006–07 Arab Champions League. All times are local, AST (UTC+3).

| Team 1 | Agg. | Team 2 | 1st leg | 2nd leg |
|---|---|---|---|---|
| Al-Ettifaq (1) | 2–4 | Al-Ittihad (1) | 1–0 | 1–4 |
| Al-Hilal (1) | 1–3 | Al-Ahli (1) | 0–2 | 1–1 |

=== Matches ===
1 April 2007
20:10

| Al-Ettifaq (1) | 1–0 | Al-Ittihad (1) |
|---|---|---|
| Al-Moghanam 73' | Report |

Prince Mohamed bin Fahd Stadium, Dammam
5 April 2007
20:10

| Al-Ittihad (1) | 4–1 | Al-Ettifaq (1) |
|---|---|---|
| Tukar 4', 67'; Reinaldo 8', 26' | Report | Bashir 9' |

Prince Abdullah Al-Faisal Stadium, Jeddah

Al-Ittihad won 4–2 on aggregate.

18 March 2007
20:10

| Al-Ahli (1) | 2–0 | Al-Hilal (1) |
|---|---|---|
| Badra 23' (pen.); Mouath 42' | Report |

Prince Abdullah Al-Faisal Stadium, Jeddah
Referee: Luis Medina Cantalejo (Spain)
7 April 2007
20:30

| Al-Hilal (1) | 1–1 | Al-Ahli (1) |
|---|---|---|
| El Taib 7' | Report | Mouath 41' |

King Fahd International Stadium, Riyadh

Al-Ahli won 3–1 on aggregate.

== Final ==
The final was held on 27 April 2007. All times are local, AST (UTC+3).

27 April 2007
20:45

| Al-Ittihad | 1–2 | Al-Ahli |
|---|---|---|
| Keita 88' | Report | Al-Jassim 80'; Mouath 87' |

Prince Abdullah Al-Faisal Stadium, Jeddah
Attendance: 27,000
Referee: Massimo Busacca (Switzerland)

== Top goalscorers ==
As of 27 April 2007

| Rank | Player | Club | Goals |
|---|---|---|---|
| 1 | (Guinea) Alhassane Keita | Al-Ittihad | 6 |
| 2 | (Brazil) Reinaldo | Al-Ittihad | 5 |
| 3 | (Saudi Arabia) Malek Mouath | Al-Ahli | 4 |

== See also ==
- 2006–07 Saudi Premier League
- 2008 AFC Champions League
