= 2007 Saudi Crown Prince Cup final =

- Event: 2006–07 Saudi Crown Prince Cup
Al-Ittihad	Al-Ahli
1	2
- Date: 27 April 2007
- Venue: Prince Abdullah Al Faisal Stadium, Jeddah
- Referee: Massimo Busacca (Switzerland)
- Attendance: 27,000

The 2007 Saudi Crown Prince Cup final was the 32nd final of the Crown Prince Cup, Saudi Arabia's main football knock-out competition at the time.

It took place on 27 April 2007 at the Prince Abdullah Al Faisal Stadium in Jeddah, Saudi Arabia and was contested between city rivals Al-Ittihad and Al-Ahli. It was Al-Ahli's tenth Crown Prince Cup final and Al-Ittihad's 11th. This was the fourth meeting between these two clubs in the final.

Al-Ahli won the game 2–1 to secure their fifth title and first since 2002. As winners of the 2006–07 Saudi Crown Prince Cup, Al-Ahli qualified for the 2008 AFC Champions League group stage.

== Teams ==
Team	Previous finals appearances (bold indicates winners)
Al-Ittihad	10 (**1958**, **1959**, **1963**, 1965, **1991**, 1993, **1997**, **2001**, 2002, **2004**)
Al-Ahli	9 (**1957**, 1958, **1970**, 1974, **1998**, **2002**, 2003, 2004, 2006)

== Venue ==
The Prince Abdullah Al Faisal Stadium in Jeddah was announced as the host of the final. This was the ninth Crown Prince Cup final to be hosted in the Prince Abdullah Al Faisal Stadium following those in 1991, 1993, 1995, 1996, 1997, 2000, 2001, and 2002.

The Prince Abdullah Al Faisal Stadium was opened in 1970 and was known as the Youth Welfare Stadium until 2001. The stadium was used as a venue for the 1989 FIFA World Youth Championship and hosted the final of the 2000–01 Asian Cup Winners' Cup. The stadium was used by the Saudi Arabia national football team, Al-Ahli, and Al-Ittihad, and hosted major domestic matches. The stadium underwent major construction in 2012 with plans to expand the number of seats and as of 2019 is still under construction.

== Background ==
Al-Ittihad reached their 11th final after a 4–2 aggregate win against Al-Ettifaq. This was Al-Ittihad's first final since 2004 when they defeated Al-Ahli 1–0.

Al-Ahli reached their ninth final, after a 3–1 aggregate win against Al-Hilal. They finished as runners-up in the previous season, losing to Al-Hilal.

This was the twelfth meeting between the two sides in the Crown Prince Cup with Al-Ahli and Al-Ittihad winning five times each and one draw between them occurred. The two teams met three times in the final with Al-Ittihad winning twice in 1958 and 2004, and Al-Ahli won the 2002 final. The two teams played each other twice in the season prior to the final, once in the league and once in the Federation Cup final. Al-Ahli defeated Al-Ittihad 3–0 in the final to win their fifth Federation Cup and Al-Ittihad won the league match 3–0.

== Road to the final ==
Al-Ittihad		Round	Al-Ahli
Opponent	Result		Opponent	Result
Al-Tai	6–1 (H)	Round of 16	Al-Riyadh	3–1 (A)
Najran	10–0 (H)	Quarter-finals	Al-Faisaly	1–0 (H)
Al-Ettifaq	0–1 (A)	Semi-finals	Al-Hilal	2–0 (H)
Al-Ettifaq	4–1 (H)	Semi-finals	Al-Hilal	1–1 (A)

Key: (H) = Home; (A) = Away

== Match ==
=== Details ===
27 April 2007
20:45 AST

Al-Ittihad	1–2	Al-Ahli
Keita 88'	Report	Al-Jassim 80'; Mouath 87'

Prince Abdullah Al-Faisal Stadium, Jeddah
Attendance: 27,000
Referee: Massimo Busacca (Switzerland)

**Al-Ittihad**	**Al-Ahli**

GK	1	(Saudi Arabia) Mabrouk Zaid
RB	2	(Saudi Arabia) Ahmed Dokhi		(substituted off) 83'
CB	33	(Saudi Arabia) Osama Al-Muwallad
CB	21	(Saudi Arabia) Hamad Al-Montashari
LB	19	(Saudi Arabia) Saleh Al-Saqri
CM	23	(Saudi Arabia) Abdullah Al-Waked		(substituted off) 50'
CM	14	(Saudi Arabia) Saud Kariri
RW	27	(Saudi Arabia) Ibrahim Al-Shahrani		(substituted off) 89'
AM	18	(Saudi Arabia) Mohammed Noor (c)
LW	10	(Brazil) Wágner
CF	3	(Guinea) Alhassane Keita
Substitutes:
DF	4	(Saudi Arabia) Redha Tukar		(substituted in) 89'
FW	9	(Saudi Arabia) Hamzah Idris		(substituted in) 83'
FW	11	(Brazil) Reinaldo	(yellow card) 63'	(substituted in) 50'
Manager:
(Belgium) Dimitri Davidovic

GK	1	(Saudi Arabia) Yasser Al-Mosailem
RB	30	(Saudi Arabia) Ibrahim Hazzazi		(substituted off) 90+3'
CB	19	(Saudi Arabia) Walid Jahdali	(yellow card) 57'
CB	2	(Tunisia) Khaled Badra
LB	24	(Saudi Arabia) Hussein Abdulghani (c)
DM	5	(Saudi Arabia) Moataz Al-Musa		(substituted off) 85'
CM	8	(Saudi Arabia) Taisir Al-Jassim	(yellow card) 65'
CM	15	(Saudi Arabia) Saheb Al-Abdullah
AM	7	(Saudi Arabia) Turky Al-Thagafi		(substituted off) 60'
AM	10	(Brazil) Caio	(yellow card) 32'
CF	9	(Saudi Arabia) Malek Mouath
Substitutes:
DF	4	(Saudi Arabia) Mohamed Al-Bishi		(substituted in) 85'
MF	18	(Saudi Arabia) Ahmed Darwish		(substituted in) 60'
DF	28	(Saudi Arabia) Jufain Al-Bishi		(substituted in) 90+3'
Manager:
(Serbia) Nebojša Vučković

**Match rules**

- 90 minutes.
- 30 minutes of extra-time if necessary.
- Penalty shoot-out if scores still level.
- Seven named substitutes.
- Maximum of three substitutions.

== See also ==
- 2006–07 Saudi Crown Prince Cup
- 2006–07 Saudi Premier League
- 2008 AFC Champions League
