= 2002 Saudi Crown Prince Cup =

2002 Crown Prince Cup
Tournament details
- Country: Saudi Arabia
- Dates: 1 February – 24 April 2002
- Teams: 16 (main competition)

Final positions
- Champions: Al-Ahli (4th title)
- Runners-up: Al-Ittihad
- AFC Champions League: Al-Ahli

Tournament statistics
- Matches played: 15
- Goals scored: 51 (3.4 per match)
- Top goal scorer(s): Luizinho Vieira (6 goals)

The 2002 Crown Prince Cup was the 27th season of the Saudi premier knockout tournament since its establishment in 1957. The main competition started on 1 February 2002 and concluded with the final on 24 April 2002.

In the final, Al-Ahli defeated defending champions Al-Ittihad 2–1 to secure their fourth title. The final was held at the Prince Abdullah Al-Faisal Stadium in Jeddah. As winners of the tournament, Al-Ahli qualified for the 2002–03 AFC Champions League third qualifying round.

== Qualifying rounds ==
All of the competing teams that are not members of the Premier League competed in the qualifying rounds to secure one of 4 available places in the Round of 16. First Division sides Abha and Al-Raed and Second Division sides Al-Adalah and Najran qualified.

== Bracket ==
Round of 16
H	Al-Ahli	2
A	Al-Raed	0
H	Al-Ettifaq	2
A	Al-Wehda	1
A	Al-Nassr	2
H	Al-Adalah	0
H	Al-Shabab	4
A	Al-Najma	0
A	Al-Hilal	1
H	Al-Tai	3
A	Al-Ansar	2
H	Najran	1
H	Al-Ittihad	6
A	Abha	0
A	Al-Riyadh	1
H	Al-Shoulla (asdet)	2

Quarter-finals
H	Al-Ahli (asdet)	1
A	Al-Ettifaq	0
H	Al-Nassr (asdet)	2
A	Al-Shabab	1
A	Al-Tai	0
H	Al-Ansar	1
H	Al-Ittihad (asdet)	4
A	Al-Shoulla	3

Semi-finals
A	Al-Ahli	2
H	Al-Nassr	1
H	Al-Ansar	2
A	Al-Ittihad	4

Final
–	Al-Ahli	2
–	Al-Ittihad	1

Source: Al-Jazirah

== Round of 16 ==
The Round of 16 fixtures were played on 1 and 2 February 2002. All times are local, AST (UTC+3).

1 February 2002 3	Al-Adalah (3)	0–2	Al-Nassr (1)	Al-Hasa
16:00		Report	Al-Harthi 88'; César 90+2'	Stadium: Prince Abdullah bin Jalawi Stadium

1 February 2002 4	Al-Shabab (1)	4–0	Al-Najma (1)	Riyadh
16:00	Khathran 20'; Majrashi 22', 45'; Al-Dossari 90'	Report		Stadium: Prince Faisal bin Fahd Stadium

1 February 2002 1	Al-Ahli (1)	2–0	Al-Raed (2)	Jeddah
20:00	Gahwji 66', 74'	Report		Stadium: Prince Abdullah Al-Faisal Stadium

1 February 2002 2	Al-Ettifaq (1)	2–1	Al-Wehda (1)	Dammam
20:00	Kamouna; Ndiaye	Report	Silva	Stadium: Prince Mohamed bin Fahd Stadium

2 February 2002 5	Al-Tai (1)	3–1	Al-Hilal (1)	Ha'il
16:00	Hamad Ji 20'; Celso 44' (pen.); Al-Rashid 56'	Report	Macedo 17'	Stadium: Prince Abdul Aziz bin Musa'ed Stadium; Referee: Khalil Al Ghamdi

2 February 2002 6	Najran (3)	1–2	Al-Ansar (1)	Najran
16:00	Hatrash 82'	Report	Al-Fraidi 35', 72'	Stadium: Al Akhdoud Club Stadium

2 February 2002 7	Al-Ittihad (1)	6–0	Abha (2)	Jeddah
20:00	Vieira,, Idris; Al-Muwallad; Lindomar	Report		Stadium: Prince Abdullah Al-Faisal Stadium

2 February 2002 8	Al-Shoulla (1)	2–1 (a.e.t.)	Al-Riyadh (1)	Al-Kharj
20:00	Cláudio 8', 91'	Report	Al-Haya'e 90+2'	Stadium: Al-Shoulla Club Stadium; Referee: Dhafer Abo Zanda

== Quarter-finals ==
The Quarter-finals fixtures were played on 6 and 7 February 2002. All times are local, AST (UTC+3).

6 February 2002 9	Al-Ahli (1)	1–0 (a.e.t.)	Al-Ettifaq (1)	Jeddah
16:00	Al-Shahrani 96' (pen.)	Report		Stadium: Prince Abdullah Al-Faisal Stadium; Referee: Mohammed Al-Marwani

6 February 2002 10	Al-Nassr (1)	2–1 (a.e.t.)	Al-Shabab (1)	Riyadh
16:00	Keïta 65'; Yazid 92'	Report	Antônio 30'	Stadium: Prince Faisal bin Fahd Stadium; Referee: Abdulrahman Al-Ghimlas

7 February 2002 11	Al-Ansar (1)	1–0	Al-Tai (1)	Medina
16:00	Al-Mutlaq 6'	Report		Stadium: Prince Mohammed bin Abdul Aziz Stadium; Referee: Dhafer Abo Zanda

7 February 2002 12	Al-Ittihad (1)	4–3 (a.e.t.)	Al-Shoulla (1)	Jeddah
20:00	Vieira 45+1' (pen.), 75'; Idris 62'; Shas 111'	Report	Cláudio 80', 83' (pen.); Al-Daajani 87'	Stadium: Prince Abdullah Al-Faisal Stadium; Referee: Yousef Al-Aqili

== Semi-finals ==
The Semi-finals fixtures were played on 18 and 19 February 2002. All times are local, AST (UTC+3).

18 February 2002 13	Al-Nassr (1)	1–2	Al-Ahli (1)	Riyadh
20:00	Al-Harthi 90+1'	Report	Al-Shehri 6', 13'	Stadium: Prince Faisal bin Fahd Stadium; Attendance: 3,592; Referee: Dhafer Abo Zanda

19 February 2002 14	Al-Ansar (1)	2–4	Al-Ittihad (1)	Medina
16:00	Salem 80', 88'	Report	Lindomar 28'; Vieira 68'; Al-Yami 76'; Idris 78'	Stadium: Prince Mohammed bin Abdul Aziz Stadium; Referee: Abdulrahman Al-Zaid

== Final ==
The 2002 Crown Prince Cup Final was played on 24 April 2002 at the Prince Abdullah Al-Faisal Stadium in Jeddah between derby rivals Al-Ahli and Al-Ittihad. This was the eighth Crown Prince Cup final to be held at the stadium. The two sides met once in the final, in 1958, which Al-Ittihad won. All times are local, AST (UTC+3).

24 April 2002
20:30

Al-Ahli	2–1	Al-Ittihad
Al-Abdali 21'; Al-Shenaif 87' (pen.)	Report	Al-Yami 46'

Prince Abdullah Al-Faisal Stadium, Jeddah
Referee: Abdulrahman Al-Zaid

== Top goalscorers ==
Rank	Player	Club	Goals
1	(Brazil) Luizinho Vieira	Al-Ittihad	6
2	(Brazil) Cláudio	Al-Shoulla	4
3	(Saudi Arabia) Hamzah Idris	Al-Ittihad	3
4	(Saudi Arabia) Naji Majrashi	Al-Shabab	2
4	(Saudi Arabia) Khaled Gahwji	Al-Ahli	2
4	(Saudi Arabia) Ghazi Al-Fraidi	Al-Ansar	2
4	(Saudi Arabia) Fouzi Al-Shehri	Al-Ahli	2
4	(Saudi Arabia) Mohsen Al-Harthi	Al-Nassr	2
4	(Brazil) Lindomar	Al-Ittihad	2
4	(Saudi Arabia) Al Tayeb Salem	Al-Ansar	2
4	(Saudi Arabia) Al Hasan Al-Yami	Al-Ittihad	2

== See also ==
- 2001–02 Saudi Premier League
