= Víctor Figueroa =

Argentine footballer

Personal information
- Full name: Víctor Alberto Figueroa
- Date of birth: September 29, 1983 (age 43)
- Place of birth: San Isidro, Argentina
- Height: 1.68 m (5 ft 6 in)
- Position: Midfielder

Team information
- Current team: Chacarita Juniors

Senior career*
Years	Team	Apps	(Gls)
2003–2006	Chacarita Juniors	116	(11)
2006	Germinal Beerschot	11	(0)
2007	Sarmiento de Junín	14	(1)
2007–2008	Chacarita	34	(9)
2008–2009	Godoy Cruz	36	(9)
2009–2011	Al-Nassr	42	(19)
2011–2019	Newell's Old Boys	198	(19)
2016	→ Colón (loan)	14	(2)
2019–2022	Aucas	104	(36)
2023	Cuniburo		(6)
2024–	Chacarita Juniors	37	(5)
- * Club domestic league appearances and goals

Víctor Alberto Figueroa (born 29 September 1983 in San Isidro) is an Argentine football midfielder who currently plays for Chacarita Juniors.

== Career ==
Figueroa started his career at Chacarita Juniors in the Primera Division Argentina in 2002. At the end of the 2003–2004 season Chacarita were relegated to the Argentine 2nd Division. Figueroa stayed at the club and became a regular starter for the team.

In 2006, he played for K.F.C. Germinal Beerschot in Belgium and in 2007 he played for Sarmiento before returning to Chacarita Juniors. In 2008, he was loaned to Godoy Cruz which plays in the Primera División Argentina.

In 2009, he returned to international soccer, this time at a club in Saudi Arabia, Al-Nassr, where he played 42 games and converted 19. goals.

On 15 July 2011 Figueroa signed for Newell's Old Boys. On 20 January 2016 he was loaned out to Club Atlético Colón on a 5-month deal.

On the second semester of 2019, he joined S.D. Aucas, where he played until the end of 2022, year in which the club obtained the title of champions of the Ecuadorian Serie A.

== Honours ==
Newell's Old Boys

- Primera División: 2013 Final
- Copa Libertadores da América: 1992
