= Ibrahim Madkhali =

Saudi Arabian footballer

Personal information
- Full name: Ibrahim Ahmed Madkhali
- Date of birth: November 17, 1984 (age 41)
- Place of birth: Saudi Arabia
- Height: 1.79 m (5 ft 10 in)
- Position: Defender

Senior career*
Years	Team	Apps	(Gls)
2005–2008	Al-Riyadh SC	??	(7)
2008–2009	Al-Nassr FC	7	(0)
2009–2011	Al-Faisaly	24	(2)
2011–2016	Al-Raed FC	87	(3)
2016–2017	Al-Qaisomah	10	(0)
2017–2018	Al-Sharq		
2018–2019	Al-Najma		
- * Club domestic league appearances and goals

Ibrahim Madkhali [إبراهيم مدخلي in Arabic] (born 17 November 1984) is a Saudi football player who currently plays as a defender .
