= Abdullah Al-Dossari (born 1983) =

Saudi Arabian footballer (born 1983)

Abdullah Al-Dossari عبد الله الدوسري
Personal information
- Full name: Abdullah Abdulrahman Al-Dossari
- Date of birth: 1 February 1983 (age 43)
- Place of birth: Saudi Arabia
- Height: 1.77 m (5 ft 10 in)
- Position: Midfielder

Youth career
- Al-Shabab

Senior career*
Years	Team	Apps	(Gls)
2002–2010	Al-Shabab		
2008–2009	→ Al-Wehda (loan)	15	(0)
2010–2011	Al-Hazem	14	(0)
2011–2012	Al-Fateh	25	(0)
2012–2013	Al-Ettifaq	9	(0)
2013–2015	Al-Fateh	31	(0)
2017–2018	Al-Mujazzal		

International career
2002–2003	Saudi Arabia U20		
2006	Saudi Arabia	1	(0)
- * Club domestic league appearances and goals as of 17 May 2020

Abdullah Al-Dossari (Arabic: عبد الله الدوسري; born 1 February 1983) is a Saudi Arabian footballer who plays as a midfielder.
