= Ala Al-Kuwaikabi =

Saudi Arabian footballer (born 1980)

Personal information
- Full name: Ala Al-Kuwaikabi
- Date of birth: 30 August 1980 (age 46)
- Place of birth: Saudi Arabia
- Height: 1.78 m (5 ft 10 in)
- Position: Striker

Youth career
- Al-Wahda

Senior career*
Years	Team	Apps	(Gls)
?–2010	Al-Wahda		
2006	→ Al-Shabab (loan)		
2009	→ Al-Nassr FC (loan)		

International career
2006	Saudi Arabia	3	(0)
- * Club domestic league appearances and goals

Ala Al-Kuwaikabi (Arabic: علاء الكويكبي; born 30 August 1980) is a football wing midfielder playing at Al-Nasr Club in Saudi Arabia.

He joined Al-Nasr in the winter of 2009 coming from Al-Wahda FC (Mecca).
