= Fahad Al-Zahrani =

Saudi Arabian footballer

Personal information
- Full name: Fahad Al-Zahrani
- Date of birth: 2 February 1979 (age 47)
- Place of birth: Saudi Arabia
- Height: 1.70 m (5 ft 7 in)
- Position: Midfielder

Senior career*
Years	Team	Apps	(Gls)
1997–2008	Al-Ahli		
2007–2008	→ Al-Nassr (loan)		
2008–2009	Al-Nassr		
2009–2010	Al Fateh (Sports Club)		
2010–2011	Al-Ansar		
2011–2012	Al-Ameed		

International career
- Saudi Arabia
- * Club domestic league appearances and goals

Fahad Al-Zahrani (born 2 February 1979) is a football midfielder. At the club level, he currently plays for Al-Nassr in Saudi Arabia.

Al-Zahrani joined Al-Nasr at the summer of 2007 on a one-year loan from Al-Ahli. In 2008, he moved permanently to Al-Nasr.

Al-Zahrani also played for Saudi Arabia at the 1999 FIFA World Youth Championship in Nigeria.
