= 24th GCC Champions League =

2008 GCC Champions League
Tournament details
- Teams: 9 (from AFC/UAFA confederations)

Final positions
- Champions: (Saudi Arabia) Al-Ahli (3rd title)
- Runners-up: (Saudi Arabia) Al-Nassr

Tournament statistics
- Top scorer: (Kuwait) Bader Al-Mutawa (6 goals)

The 24th GCC Champions League (Arabic: دوري أبطال مجلس التعاون الخليجي) was the 24th edition of the GCC Champions League for clubs of the Gulf Cooperation Council nations, held in 2008.

== Participating clubs ==
- (Bahrain) Al-Najma
- (Bahrain) Al Muharraq
- (Kuwait) Al Qadsia
- (Kuwait) Al Salmiya
- (Oman) Al-Nahda
- (Oman) Dhofar
- (Qatar) Al Khor
- (Saudi Arabia) Al-Ahli
- (Saudi Arabia) Al-Nassr

== Clubs withdrawn ==
- (Qatar) Umm-Salal Sports Club, withdrew
- (United Arab Emirates) UAE representatives not entered

== Group A ==
Final Standings

Team	Pld	W	D	L	GF	GA	GD	Pts
(Kuwait) Al Qadsia	4	3	1	0	11	1	+10	10
(Saudi Arabia) Al-Nassr	4	2	1	1	5	3	+2	7
(Bahrain) Al Muharraq	4	1	3	0	4	2	+2	6
(Qatar) Al Khor	4	0	2	2	3	10	–7	2
(Oman) Al-Nahda	4	0	1	3	2	9	–7	1

== Group B ==
Final Standings

Team	Pld	W	D	L	GF	GA	GD	Pts
(Saudi Arabia) Al-Ahli	3	2	1	0	5	1	+4	7
(Kuwait) Al Salmiya	3	2	0	1	6	5	+1	6
(Oman) Dhofar	3	1	0	2	4	7	–3	3
(Bahrain) Al-Najma	3	0	1	2	2	4	–2	1

== Semi-finals ==
=== 1st legs ===
October 27, 2008

Al-Nassr (Saudi Arabia)	Promoted to final	(Saudi Arabia) Al-Ahli

King Fahd Stadium

October 19, 2008

Al Salmiya (Kuwait)	3–4	(Kuwait) Al Qadsia

Thamir Stadium

=== 2nd legs ===
November 3, 2008

Al-Ahli (Saudi Arabia)	Promoted to final	(Saudi Arabia) Al-Nassr

Prince Sultan bin Fahd Stadium

October 25, 2008

Al Qadsia (Kuwait)	Canceled^{1}	(Kuwait) Al Salmiya

Mohammed Al-Hamad Stadium

^{1} The Kuwaiti clubs' matches canceled due to FIFA's freezing of the membership of the Kuwait Football Association. Therefore the second leg clash between the Kuwaiti sides was annulled and the other semi-final involving club sides from Saudi Arabia was promoted to be played as the final.

== Final ==
November 28, 2008

Al-Ahli (Saudi Arabia)	1–0	(Saudi Arabia) Al-Nassr
Al-Raheb 35'

Prince Sultan bin Fahd Stadium

December 3, 2008

Al-Nassr (Saudi Arabia)	0–2	(Saudi Arabia) Al-Ahli
		Al-Raheb 68'; Al-Kharashi 80'

King Fahd Stadium

== Winner ==
GCC Champions League
2008 Winners

Al-Ahli
3rd Title
