= Waleed Al-Rajaa =

Saudi Arabian footballer

Personal information
- Full name: Waleed Hendi Al-Rajaa
- Date of birth: 4 November 1981 (age 44)
- Place of birth: Saudi Arabia
- Height: 1.73 m (5 ft 8 in)
- Position: Left-back

Senior career*
Years	Team	Apps	(Gls)
2002–2011	Al Ittifaq		
2010–2012	Al-Taawoun FC	7	(0)
2012–2013	Hajer	17	(1)
2013–2014	Al-Nahda	14	(0)
2014–2015	Khaleej FC	3	(0)
2015–2016	Al-Nahda		
2016–2018	Al-Sahel FC		
- * Club domestic league appearances and goals

Waleed Al-Rajaa is a Saudi Arabian footballer who played as a left-back.
