= Ahmed Al-Mubarak =

Saudi Arabian footballer

Personal information
- Full name: Ahmed Al-Mubarak
- Date of birth: 31 March 1985 (age 41)
- Place of birth: Al-Hasa, Saudi Arabia
- Height: 1.77 m (5 ft 10 in)
- Position: Winger

Youth career
- Al-Adalah

Senior career*
Years	Team	Apps	(Gls)
2005–2006	Al-Adalah		
2006–2011	Al-Nassr		
2011–2014	Ettifaq	33	(2)
2014–2015	Al-Khaleej	18	(4)
2015–2017	Al-Fateh SC		
2017–2018	Al-Nojoom FC		
- * Club domestic league appearances and goals

Ahmed Al-Mubarak (Arabic: أحمد المبارك; born 31 March 1985) is a football (soccer) player who plays as a winger.
