= Abdulrahman Al-Bishi =

Saudi Arabian footballer (1982–2026)

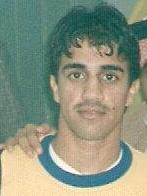

Personal information
- Date of birth: 1 July 1982
- Place of birth: Saudi Arabia
- Date of death: 15 March 2026 (aged 43)
- Height: 1.63 m (5 ft 4 in)
- Position: Forward

Youth career
- 1996–2000: Al-Nassr

Senior career*
| Years | Team | Apps | (Gls) |
| 2000–2009 | Al-Nassr | | (20+) |
| 2009–2011 | Sdoos Club | | |

International career
- Saudi Arabia U17
- Saudi Arabia U20
- Saudi Arabia U23
| 2004 | Saudi Arabia | 5 | (0) |
- * Club domestic league appearances and goals

Abdulrahman Al-Bishi (Arabic: عبدالرحمن البيشي; 1 July 1982 – 15 March 2026) was a Saudi Arabian footballer who played as a forward.

== Club career ==
Al-Bishi joined the Al-Nassr club in 1996 through Mr. Abdulla Al-Howaishel. Fifteen days after joining, he was recalled by the Al-Nasr's Under 17 squad's trainer Yousef Khamis. At the beginning, Al-Bishi played as a midfielder; however, Khamis decided that Al-Bishi would be better suited in a forward position.

In Al-Bishi's first two seasons, he scored 74 goals for Al-Nassr's under 17 team. When he was 17, Al-Bishi was called for Al-Nasr's under 20 squad. He played his first match when he was just 18.

== International career ==
Al-Bishi played with almost every Saudi Arabian team but didn't get the success he looked for due to the frequent injuries he suffered. He made three appearances for Saudi Arabia at the 2004 AFC Asian Cup finals.

He played with the Saudi schools team, under 17, under 20, under 23 and the Saudi first team.

== Illness and death ==
Al-Bishi's struggle with amyotrophic lateral sclerosis began in 2019. He died from complications of the condition on 15 March 2026, at the age of 43.
