= Saad Al-Harthi =

Saudi Arabian footballer

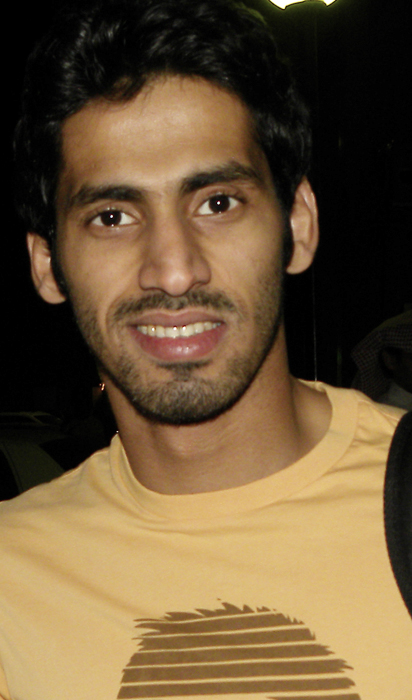

Personal information
- Full name: Saad Mish'al Al-Harthi
- Date of birth: 3 February 1984 (age 42)
- Place of birth: Riyadh, Saudi Arabia
- Height: 1.78 m (5 ft 10 in)
- Position: Striker

Senior career*
Years	Team	Apps	(Gls)
2004–2011	Al-Nassr	84	(71)
2006–2007	→ Al-Ittihad (loan)	1	(1)
2011–2013	Al-Hilal	12	(4)
Total		97	(76)

International career^{‡}
2004–2010	Saudi Arabia	44	(9)
- * Club domestic league appearances and goals as of 13 June 2009 ‡ National team caps and goals as of 23 June 2009

Saad Mish'al Al-Harthi, also transliterated Sa'ad Al-Harthi (Arabic: سعد مشعل الحارثي; born 3 February 1984) is a Saudi Arabian former football striker who played for Saudi Premiership side Al-Nassr FC. He retired from playing football in 2013.

== Career ==
On 14 March 2007, Al-Harthi was awarded the "Most promising Arab player" Award for 2006 given by the Lebanese Al-Hadth football magazine.

== International goals ==
#	Date	Venue	Opponent	Score	Result	Competition
1	November 17, 2004	Gelora Bung Karno, Jakarta	Sri Lanka	3-0	Won	2006 FIFA World Cup qualification (AFC)
2	April 9, 2005	Prince Abdullah al-Faisal Stadium, Jeddah	Yemen	4-0	Won	Football at the 2005 Islamic Solidarity Games
3	April 11, 2005	Prince Abdullah al-Faisal Stadium, Jeddah	Palestine	3-0	Won	Football at the 2005 Islamic Solidarity Games
4	June 3, 2005	King Fahd Stadium, Riyadh	Kuwait	3-0	Won	2006 FIFA World Cup qualification (AFC)
5	June 8, 2005	King Fahd Stadium, Riyadh	Uzbekistan	3-0	Won	2006 FIFA World Cup qualification (AFC)
6	14 July 2007	Gelora Bung Karno Stadium, Jakarta	Indonesia	2-1	Won	2007 AFC Asian Cup
7	11 September 2007	King Fahd Stadium, Riyadh	Ghana	5-0	Won	Friendly match
8	22 June 2008	King Fahd Stadium, Riyadh	Uzbekistan	4-0	Won	2010 FIFA World Cup qualification (AFC)
9	6 September 2008	King Fahd Stadium, Riyadh	Iran	1-1	Draw	2010 FIFA World Cup qualification (AFC)

== Honours ==
=== Club ===
Al-Nassr

- Federation Cup: 2007–08

Al-Hilal

- Crown Prince Cup: 2011–12, 2012–13

=== International ===
Saudi Arabia

- Islamic Solidarity Games: 2005
- AFC Asian Cup: Runner-up 2007
