= Éder Gaúcho =

Brazilian footballer

Personal information
- Full name: Éder Guterres Silveira
- Date of birth: 7 October 1977 (age 49)
- Place of birth: Santana do Livramento, Brazil
- Height: 1.87 m (6 ft 2 in)
- Position: Centre back

Youth career
- 1994–1996: Grêmio

Senior career*
Years	Team	Apps	(Gls)
1997–1999	Grêmio	35	(3)
2000–2002	União Leiria	60	(3)
2002–2005	Boavista	83	(5)
2005–2006	Terek Grozny	27	(1)
2007	Sertãozinho	16	(3)
2007–2008	União Leiria	21	(1)
2008–2010	Al Nassr	16	(0)
2010	Al Sharjah		
2010–2011	Baniyas	8	(0)
2011–2012	Ypiranga-RS	14	(0)
Total		266	(16)

International career
1997	Brazil U20	3	(1)
- * Club domestic league appearances and goals

Éder Guterres Silveira (born 7 October 1977), known as Éder or Éder Gaúcho, is a Brazilian retired footballer who played as a central defender.

== Club career ==
Born in São Borja, Rio Grande do Sul, Gaúcho started his professional career with Grêmio Foot-Ball Porto Alegrense. In 2000, he moved abroad, joining U.D. Leiria of Portugal, where he remained two seasons.

Éder stayed in the country afterwards, transferring to Boavista F.C. with the aid of an investment fund, which signed a portion of the player's rights and received a portion of any future transfer fee. He played all four games in the campaign's UEFA Champions League qualifying rounds, adding 12 matches and one goal in the 2002–03 UEFA Cup as the Porto club reached the semifinals.

In the 2005 summer, Gaúcho signed for Russian side FC Terek Grozny. In February 2007, however, he returned to Brazil and agreed to a six-month contract with Sertãozinho Futebol Clube, which appeared in the Paulistan League. In July he returned to Leiria, notably scoring in the 4–1 home win over FK Hajduk Kula in the second leg of the last qualifying round of the 2007 UEFA Intertoto Cup which subsequently qualified for the UEFA Cup, with his team being eliminated in the first round of the competition.

In July 2008, Éder joined Al-Nassr FC of Saudi Arabia – he also played in the Middle East region for Al-Rayyan SC, appearing in the 2009 Emir of Qatar Cup final. In January 2010 he left the club, in exchange for Pascal Feindouno.

== International career ==
Éder played for Brazil under-20s at the 1997 FIFA World Youth Championship in Malaysia. As the national team exited in the quarter-finals, he scored in a 10–0 demolition of Belgium in the round of 16.

== Honours ==
- UEFA Intertoto Cup: 2007
- Campeonato Gaúcho: 1999
