= Hamad Al-Sagoor =

Saudi Arabian footballer

Personal information
- Full name: Hamad Al-Sagoor
- Date of birth: July 1, 1979 (age 47)
- Place of birth: Najran, Saudi Arabia
- Height: 1.80 m (5 ft 11 in)
- Position: Defender

Senior career*
| Years | Team | Apps | (Gls) |
| 2000–2004 | Al-Akhdoud | | |
| 2004–2010 | Al-Nassr | | |
| 2010–2014 | Al-Raed | 54 | (2) |
| 2014 | Najran | 4 | (0) |
| 2014–2015 | Al-Akhdoud | | |
- * Club domestic league appearances and goals

Hamad Al-Sagoor (Arabic: حمد الصقور; born July 1, 1979) is a retired professional footballer who played as a defender for Al-Akhdoud, Al-Nassr, Al-Raed and Najran.
