= Abdulla Al-Mousa =

Saudi Arabian footballer

Personal information
- Full name: Abdulla Nasser Al-Mousa
- Date of birth: July 1, 1988 (age 38)
- Place of birth: Saudi Arabia
- Position: Midfielder

Youth career
- Al-Nassr

Senior career*
| Years | Team | Apps | (Gls) |
| 2007–2010 | Al-Nassr | | |
| 2010–2018 | Al-Riyadh | | |
| 2018–2021 | Al Muzahimiyyah | | |
- * Club domestic league appearances and goals

Abdulla Nasser Al-Mousa is a footballer. He currently plays as a midfielder.

Al-Mousa started playing for the first team in the 2007-2008 season.
