= Abdo Barnawi =

Saudi Arabian footballer

Personal information
- Full name: Abdo Baker Barnawi
- Date of birth: 17 February 1984 (age 42)
- Place of birth: Jeddah, Saudi Arabia
- Height: 1.78 m (5 ft 10 in)
- Position: Defender

Senior career*
Years	Team	Apps	(Gls)
?–2007	Al-Faisaly		
2007–2014	Al-Nassr		
2013	→ Al-Fateh SC (loan)		
2013–2014	→ Al-Faisaly (loan)		
2014–2016	Al-Ta'ee		
2016	Al-Nahda		
2017	Jeddah		
2017–2018	Al-Riyadh		
2018–2019	Al-Entesar		

International career
- Saudi Arabia
- * Club domestic league appearances and goals

Abdo Baker Barnawi (Arabic: عبده برناوي; born 17 February 1984) is a Saudi Arabian footballer. He plays as a defender.

He started his career at Al-Faisaly Club before joining Al-Nasr in the summer of 2007.
