= Bader Al-Kharashi =

Saudi Arabian footballer

Bader Al Kharashi
Personal information
- Full name: Bader Abdulaziz Al Karashi
- Date of birth: June 13, 1982 (age 44)
- Place of birth: Saudi Arabia
- Height: 1.73 m (5 ft 8 in)
- Position: Forward

Youth career
- 1999–2002: Al-Hilal

Senior career*
Years	Team	Apps	(Gls)
2002–2008	Al-Hilal	78	(38)
2008–2010	Al-Ahli	47	(21)
2010–2011	Al-Hazm	12	(0)
2011	Al-Raed	8	(0)
2011–2013	Al-Faisaly	17	(9)
2013–2014	Al-Taawon FC	17	(3)
2014–2015	Al-Wehda	5	(0)
- * Club domestic league appearances and goals

Bader Al Kharashi [بدر الخراشي in Arabic] (born 13 June 1982) is a Saudi football player. who currently plays for Al-Faisaly.
