= Al-Khor SC Stadium =

Stadium in Qatar

Al-Khor Stadium
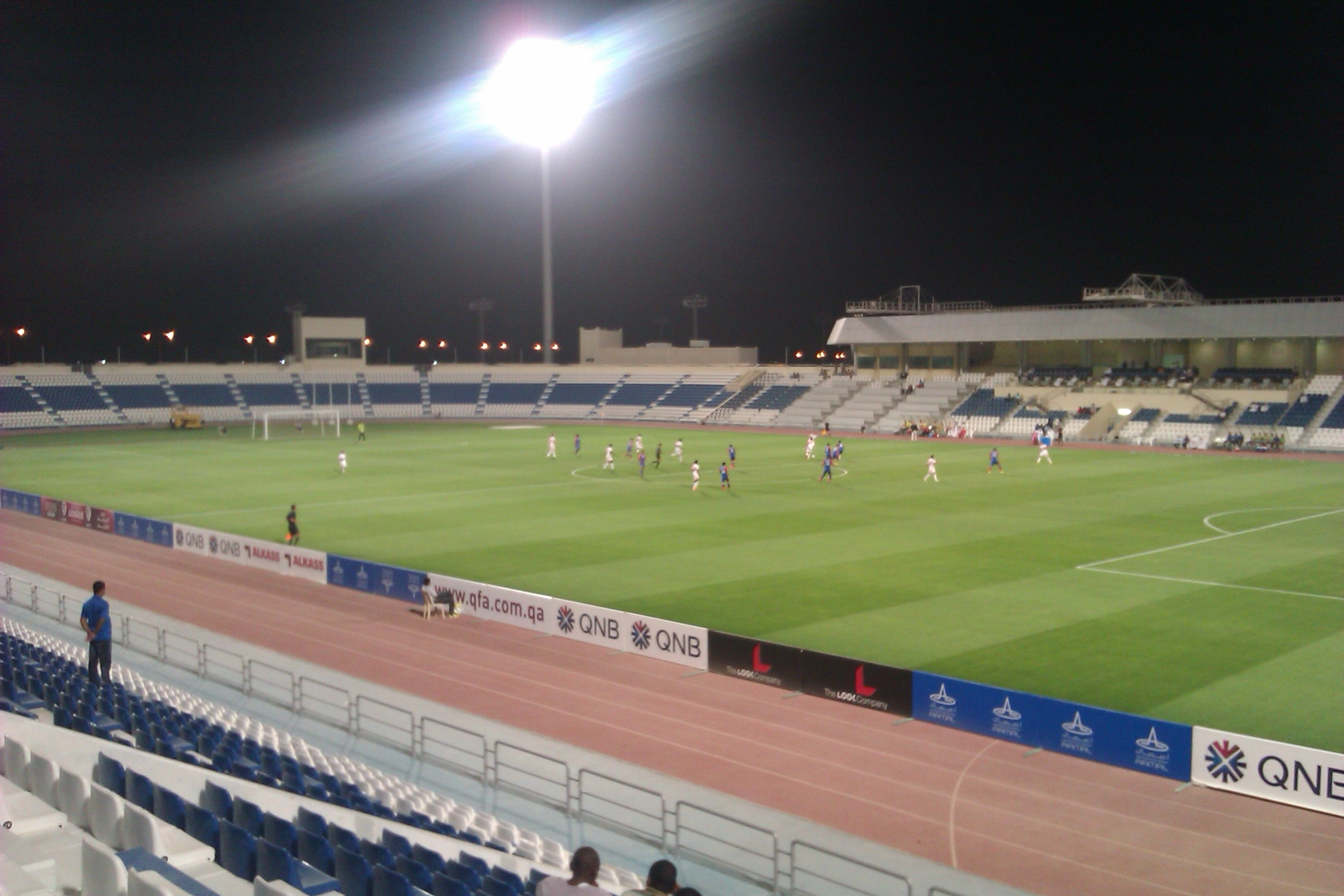
- Interactive map of Al-Khor Stadium
- Location: Al Khor, Qatar
- Coordinates: 25°40′45.86″N 51°29′33.47″E
- Owner: Al-Khor SC
- Capacity: 12,000
- Surface: Grass

Tenants
- Al-Khor SC; Al-Kharaitiyat SC

The Al-Khor Stadium (Arabic: ملعب نادي الخور) is a multi-purpose stadium in the coastal town of Al Khor, in northeastern Qatar. The stadium is home to Al-Khor Sports Club. The capacity of the stadium is 45,330, making it one of the larger stadiums in the Qatar Stars League. After the QSL, it will be reduced to a capacity of 25,500.
