= Dhaya Haroon =

Saudi Arabian footballer

Personal information
- Full name: Dhaya Haroon
- Date of birth: 18 September 1980 (age 46)
- Place of birth: ?, Saudi Arabia
- Height: 1.79 m (5 ft 10 in)
- Position: Midfielder

Senior career*
Years	Team	Apps	(Gls)
2002–2006	Al-Ansar		
2006–2009	Al-Nassr		
2009	Al-Raed		
2009–2010	Abha Club		
2010–2011	Al-Ansar		
2011–2012	Sdoos		
2013	Al Jabalain		

International career
- Saudi Arabia
- * Club domestic league appearances and goals

Dhaya Haroon is a football midfielder playing at Al-Nassr Club in Saudi Arabia.

He started playing for the first team in 2005–2006 season after joining from Al-Ansar.
