= Ryan Belal =

Saudi Arabian footballer

Personal information
- Full name: Ryan Belal
- Date of birth: October 4, 1988 (age 38)
- Place of birth: Medina, Saudi Arabia
- Height: 1.83 m (6 ft 0 in)
- Position: Striker

Youth career
- 2001–2005: Ohod

Senior career*
| Years | Team | Apps | (Gls) |
| 2005–2007 | Ohod | | |
| 2007–2012 | Al-Nassr | | |
| 2012 | Al-Qadsiah | 7 | (1) |
| 2012–2013 | Al-Raed | 12 | (0) |
| 2013–2014 | Al-Faisaly | 18 | (6) |
| 2014–2015 | Al-Taawoun | 10 | (1) |
| 2015 | → Al-Ettifaq (loan) | 4 | (0) |
| 2015–2016 | Ohod | | |
| 2016–2019 | Al-Ansar | | |
| 2019 | Wej | | |
| 2019–2021 | Al-Najma | | |
| 2021–2022 | Al-Anwar | | |
| 2024–2025 | Al-Zaytoon | | |

International career
| 2007–2009 | Saudi Arabia U23 | | |
| 2009–2010 | Saudi Arabia | 5 | (1) |
- * Club domestic league appearances and goals

Ryan Belal (Arabic: ريان بلال; born 4 October 1988) is a football player, who plays as a striker .

He joined Al-Nasr in the summer of 2007, having left the Ohod club of Medina. He is nicknamed the "Maradona of the Desert", because he scored By hand in the Saudi League 2011/2012 season.
