= Prince Faisal bin Fahd Cup =

Prince Faisal Cup
- Organiser(s): Saudi Arabian Football Federation (SAFF)
- Founded: 1975; 51 years ago (As Saudi Federation Cup)
- Abolished: 2011; 15 years ago
- Teams: 12
- Last champions: Al-Shabab (4th title)
- Most championships: Al-Hilal (7 titles)

The Prince Faisal bin Fahd Cup, formerly known as the Saudi Federation Cup, was an association football competition organized by the Saudi Arabian Football Federation.

== History ==
The competition was founded in the 1975–76 season, with Al-Nassr as the first champion. Initially, it was for senior teams, but the rules were later changed to allow only players under 23 years of age. However, after a few years and a lack of spectator interest, the competition was reopened to players of all ages.

In 2000, the name of the competition was changed from saudi federation Cup to its current title, a decision made to commemorate the late Prince Faisal bin Fahd.

The 2009-10 edition was the final tournament for first teams. It was then changed to an Under-21 competition, counting for youth teams rather than the first team. Al-Hilal is the record holder in this competition with the most championships.

== List of champions ==
=== First team ===
No.	Season	Champion	Runner-up	Score
1	1975–76	Al-Nassr	Al-Ahli	1–0
2	1985–86	Al-Ittihad	Al-Hilal	0–0 (a.e.t.), 3–2 pen.
3	1986–87	Al-Hilal	Al-Ettifaq	2–0
4	1987–88	Al-Shabab	Al-Ittihad	2–1
5	1988–89	Al-Shabab	Al-Ahli	1–1 (a.e.t.), 4–3 pen.
6	1989–90	Al-Hilal	Al-Qadsiah	1–0
7	1990–91	Al-Ettifaq	Al-Ahli	2–1
8	1992–93	Al-Hilal	Al-Qadsiah	0–0 (a.e.t.), 5–4 pen.
9	1993–94	Al-Qadsiah	Al-Nassr	2–0
10	1994–95	Al-Riyadh	Al-Ettifaq	3–2
11	1995–96	Al-Hilal	Al-Ettifaq	4–2
12	1996–97	Al-Ittihad	Al-Ahli	3–1
13	1997–98	Al-Nassr	Al-Ittihad	2–1
14	1998–99	Al-Ittihad	Al-Shabab	1–0
15	1999–2000	Al-Hilal	Al-Shabab	2–1 asdet
16	2000–01	Al-Ahli	Al-Nassr	2–2 (a.e.t.), 6–4 pen.
17	2001–02	Al-Ahli	Al-Hilal	2–2 (a.e.t.), 4–3 pen.
18	2002–03	Al-Ettifaq	Al-Ahli	4–3 asdet
19	2003–04	Al-Ettifaq	Al-Hilal	1–1 (a.e.t.), 5–4 pen.
20	2004–05	Al-Hilal	Al-Ettifaq	2–1
21	2005–06	Al-Hilal	Al-Ahli	2–0
22	2006–07	Al-Ahli	Al-Ittihad	3–0
23	2007–08	Al-Nassr	Al-Hilal	2–1
24	2008–09	Al-Shabab	Al-Nassr	0–0 (a.e.t.), 4–3 pen.
25	2009–10	Al-Shabab	Al-Hilal	2–1

=== U21 team ===
No.	Season	Champion	Runner-up
1	2010–11	Al-Shabab	Al-Ahli
2	2011–12	Al-Ahli	Al-Hilal
3	2012–13	Al-Ahli	Al-Ittihad
4	2013–14	Al-Hilal	Al-Ahli
5	2014–15	Al-Shabab	Al-Hilal

== Performance by club ==
=== First team ===
No.	Club	Winners	Runners-up
1	Al Hilal	7	5
2	Al-Shabab	4	2
3	Al-Ahli	3	6
4	Al-Ettifaq	3	4
5	Al-Ittihad	3	3
6	Al-Nassr	3	3
7	Al-Qadsiah	1	2
8	Al-Riyadh	1	0

=== U-21 team ===
No.	Club	Winners	Runners-up
1	Al-Shabab	2	0
2	Al-Ahli	2	2
3	Al-Hilal	1	2

== See also ==
- Saudi Arabia Football Federation
