= 2010–11 Saudi Pro League =

Saudi Pro League
- Season: 2010–2011
- Dates: 14 August 2010 – 20 May 2011
- Champions: Al-Hilal (13th title)
- Relegated: Al-Wehda; Al-Hazem
- Champions League: Al-Hilal; Al-Ahli; Al-Ittihad; Al-Ettifaq
- Matches: 182
- Goals: 534 (2.93 per match)
- Top goalscorer: Nasser Al-Shamrani (17 goals)
- Biggest home win: Al-Wehda 8–1 Al-Hazem (24 February 2011)
- Biggest away win: Najran 1–5 Al-Wehda (22 April 2011)
- Highest scoring: Al-Wehda 8–1 Al-Hazem (24 February 2011)
- Longest winning run: 7 games Al-Ittihad
- Longest unbeaten run: 26 games Al-Hilal
- Longest winless run: 14 games Al-Hazem
- Longest losing run: 14 games Al-Hazem
- Highest attendance: 21,174; Al-Ettifaq 2–3 Al-Hilal (1 April 2011)
- Lowest attendance: 6 (spectator ban); Al-Hazem 1–4 Al-Ettifaq (21 April 2011)
- Average attendance: 4,204

The 2010–11 Saudi Professional League (known as the Zain Professional League for sponsorship reasons) was the 35th season of the Saudi Pro League, the top Saudi professional league for association football clubs, since its establishment in 1976. The season began on 14 August 2010, and ended on 20 May 2011. Al-Hilal were the defending champions. The league was contested by the 12 teams from the 2009–10 season as well as Al-Faisaly and Al-Taawoun, who joined as the promoted clubs from the Saudi First Division. No teams were relegated the previous season following the decision to increase the number of teams from 12 to 14.

On 29 April, defending champions Al-Hilal won their 13th league title with two games to spare after a 1–0 home win over Al-Raed. Al-Hilal ended the season without a single defeat – the first team ever to do so in a 26-game league season and the second team overall (the first was Al-Ettifaq in 1983, during an 18-game league season).

Al-Hazem were the first team to be relegated following a 2–0 away defeat to Al-Taawoun. Al-Wehda became the second and final team to be relegated following the decision to dock 3 points from them.

== Overview ==
=== Changes ===
The SAFF announced that the number of teams in the league would be increased from 12 to 14.

=== Qualification and Prize money ===
The league champions, runners-up and third place as well as the winner of the King Cup of Champions qualified for the 2012 AFC Champions League.

The top six teams, and the Crown Prince Cup winners and runners-up qualified for King Cup of Champions.

Prize money:

- First place: 2.5 million SAR
- Second place: 1.5 million SAR
- Third place: 1 million SAR

== Teams ==
14 teams competed in the league – 12 teams from the previous season and two teams promoted from the First Division. No teams were relegated the previous season following the decision to increase the number of teams from 12 to 14. The promoted teams were Al-Faisaly (returning after an absence of three years) and Al Taawoun (returning after an absence of 13 years).

=== Stadiums and locations ===
Locations of teams in the 2010–11 Saudi Professional League

Club	Location	Stadium	Capacity
Al-Ahli	Jeddah	Prince Abdullah Al-Faisal Sports City	24,000
Al-Ettifaq	Dammam	Prince Mohamed bin Fahd Stadium	30,000
Al-Faisaly	Harmah	Al Majma'ah Sports City Stadium	10,000
Al-Fateh	Hofuf	Prince Abdullah bin Jalawi Stadium	20,000
Al-Hazem	Ar Rass	Al-Hazem Club Stadium	11,000
Al-Hilal	Riyadh	King Fahd Sports City; Prince Faisal bin Fahd Sports City Stadium	69,000; 22,188
Al-Ittihad	Jeddah	Prince Abdullah Al-Faisal Sports City	24,000
Al-Nassr	Riyadh	King Fahd Sports City; Prince Faisal bin Fahd Sports City Stadium	69,000; 22,188
Al-Qadsiah	Khobar	Prince Saud bin Jalawi Sports City	10,000
Al-Raed	Buraidah	King Abdullah Sports City	25,000
Al-Shabab	Riyadh	King Fahd Sports City; Prince Faisal bin Fahd Sports City Stadium	69,000; 22,188
Al-Taawoun	Buraidah	King Abdullah Sports City	25,000
Al-Wehda	Mecca	King Abdulaziz Sports City	28,550
Najran	Najran	Prince Hathloul bin Abdulaziz Sports City	10,000

=== Personnel ===
Club	Head coach	2009–10 season	Notes
Al-Ahli	(Serbia) Aleksandar Ilić	6th	
Al-Ettifaq	(Tunisia) Youssef Zouaoui	9th	
Al-Faisaly	(Croatia) Zlatko Dalić	First Division champions	
Al-Fateh	(Tunisia) Fathi Al-Jabal	8th	
Al-Hazem	(Canada) Goran Miscevic	7th	
Al-Hilal	(Argentina) Gabriel Calderón	**1st**	Qualified to the 2011 AFC Champions League
Al-Ittihad	(Serbia) Dimitri Davidović	2nd	Qualified to the 2011 AFC Champions League
Al-Nassr	(Croatia) Dragan Skočić	3rd	Qualified to the 2011 AFC Champions League
Al-Qadsiah	(Bulgaria) Dimitar Dimitrov	10th	
Al-Raed	(Portugal) Eurico Gomes	11th	
Al-Shabab	(Argentina) Enzo Trossero	4th	Qualified to the 2011 AFC Champions League
Al-Taawoun	(Romania) Florin Motroc	First Division runners-up	
Al-Wehda	(Tunisia) Lotfi Benzarti	5th	
Najran	(Portugal) José Rachão	12th	

=== Managerial changes ===
Team	Outgoing manager	Manner of departure	Date of vacancy	Position in table	Incoming manager	Date of appointment
Al-Faisaly	(Tunisia) Hadi Ben Mokhtar	End of contract	9 May 2010	Pre-season	(Croatia) Zlatko Dalić	19 May 2010
Al-Taawoun	(Romania) Grigore Sichitiu	End of contract	9 May 2010	Pre-season	(Romania) Gheorghe Mulțescu	2 July 2010
Al-Nassr	(Uruguay) Jorge da Silva	End of contract	18 May 2010	Pre-season	(Italy) Walter Zenga	18 May 2010
Al-Hazem	(Brazil) Lula Pereira	End of contract	30 May 2010	Pre-season	(Tunisia) Lutfi Rhim	10 July 2010
Al-Ittihad	(Argentina) Enzo Trossero	End of contract	30 May 2010	Pre-season	(Portugal) Manuel José	2 June 2010
Al-Raed	(Brazil) Edison Mario Souza	End of contract	30 May 2010	Pre-season	(Brazil) Lucho Nizzo	15 July 2010
Al-Shabab	(Brazil) Edgar Parreira	End of contract	30 May 2010	Pre-season	(Uruguay) Jorge Fossati	12 July 2010
Al-Wehda	(Portugal) Eurico Gomes	End of contract	30 May 2010	Pre-season	(France) Jean-Christian Lang	24 June 2010
Al-Ahli	(Brazil) Sérgio Farias	Signed by Al Wasl	1 July 2010	Pre-season	(Norway) Trond Sollied	1 July 2010
Al-Ahli	(Norway) Trond Sollied	Sacked	28 August 2010	8th	(Tunisia) Khaled Badra (caretaker)	28 August 2010
Al-Ahli	(Tunisia) Khaled Badra (caretaker)	End of caretaker period	10 September 2010	10th	(Serbia) Milovan Rajevac	10 September 2010
Al-Hilal	(Belgium) Eric Gerets	Signed by Morocco	25 October 2010	2nd	(Germany) Reinhard Stumpf (caretaker)	25 October 2010
Najran	(Tunisia) Mourad Okbi	Resigned	30 October 2010	10th	(Portugal) José Rachão	30 October 2010
Al-Hazem	(Tunisia) Lutfi Rhim	Sacked	31 October 2010	14th	(Tunisia) Fathi Al-Heric (caretaker)	31 October 2010
Al-Hilal	(Germany) Reinhard Stumpf (caretaker)	End of caretaker period	5 November 2010	1st	(Argentina) Gabriel Calderón	5 November 2010
Al-Raed	(Brazil) Lucho Nizzo	Sacked	7 November 2010	7th	(Portugal) Eurico Gomes	7 November 2010
Al-Hazem	(Tunisia) Fathi Al-Heric (caretaker)	End of caretaker period	13 November 2010	14th	(Canada) Goran Miscevic	13 November 2010
Al-Taawoun	(Romania) Gheorghe Mulțescu	Sacked	16 December 2010	11th	(Romania) Florin Motroc	22 December 2010
Al-Wehda	(France) Jean-Christian Lang	Sacked	23 December 2010	9th	(Egypt) Mokhtar Mokhtar	25 December 2010
Al-Ittihad	(Portugal) Manuel José	Resigned	24 December 2010	2nd	(Portugal) Toni	28 December 2010
Al-Shabab	(Uruguay) Jorge Fossati	Resigned	24 December 2010	5th	(Argentina) Enzo Trossero	27 December 2010
Al-Nassr	(Italy) Walter Zenga	Sacked	27 December 2010	3rd	(Croatia) Dragan Skočić	11 January 2011
Al-Ahli	(Serbia) Milovan Rajevac	Resigned	20 February 2011	7th	(Serbia) Aleksandar Ilić	24 February 2011
Al-Ettifaq	(Romania) Marin Ion	Sacked	23 March 2011	4th	(Tunisia) Youssef Zouaoui	23 March 2011
Al-Wehda	(Egypt) Mokhtar Mokhtar	Sacked	8 May 2011	11th	(Tunisia) Lotfi Benzarti	8 May 2011
Al-Ittihad	(Portugal) Toni	Sacked	11 May 2011	2nd	(Serbia) Dimitri Davidović	13 May 2011

=== Foreign players ===
The number of foreign players is restricted to four per team, including a slot for a player from AFC countries.

Players name in bold indicates the player was registered during the mid-season transfer window. Players name in italic indicates the player was de-registered or left their respective clubs during the mid-season transfer window.

Club	Player 1	Player 2	Player 3	AFC player	Former players
Al-Ahli	(Brazil) Marcinho	(Brazil) Victor Simões	(Serbia) **Nikola Petković**	(Oman) Amad Al-Hosni	(Brazil) Wánderson
Al-Ettifaq	(Argentina) Sebastián Tagliabúe	(Brazil) Bruno Lazaroni	(Brazil) Mateus	(Oman) Hassan Mudhafar Al-Gheilani	
Al-Faisaly	(Albania) Migen Memelli	(Croatia) Dario Jertec	(Senegal) Albaye Papa Diop	(Syria) Wael Ayan	
Al-Fateh	(Brazil) Élton Arábia	(Democratic Republic of the Congo) Doris Fuakumputu	(Tunisia) Ramzi Ben Younès	(Oman) Ahmed Kano	
Al-Hazem	(Serbia) **Nemanja Obrić**	(Serbia) **Nikica Košutić**	(Zambia) Francis Kasonde		(Jordan) Mohammad Khamees (Senegal) Mohamed Rebeiz
Al-Hilal	(Egypt) **Ahmed Ali**	(Romania) Mirel Rădoi	(Sweden) Christian Wilhelmsson	(South Korea) Lee Young-pyo	(Brazil) Thiago Neves
Al-Ittihad	(Algeria) Abdelmalek Ziaya	(Portugal) Nuno Assis	(Portugal) Paulo Jorge	(Oman) Ahmed Hadid Al-Mukhaini	
Al-Nassr	(Argentina) Víctor Figueroa	(Australia) Jonathan McKain	(Romania) Ovidiu Petre	(Kuwait) **Bader Al-Mutawa**	(Romania) Răzvan Cociș
Al-Qadisiyah	(Nigeria) Nasigba John-Jumbo	(Peru) **Juan Cominges**	(Tunisia) Mouin Chaâbani	(Bahrain) **Abdulla Baba Fatadi**	(Nigeria) Edorisi Master Ekhosuehi
Al-Raed	(Brazil) Charles da Silva	(Morocco) Jaouad Akaddar	(Morocco) Salaheddine Aqqal	(Oman) **Khalifa Ayil Al-Noufali**	(Jordan) Hatem Aqel
Al-Shabab	(Brazil) Marcelo Camacho	(Brazil) Marcelo Tavares	(Guinea) **Alhassane Keita**	(Kuwait) **Musaed Neda**	(South Korea) Song Chong-gug (Uruguay) Juan Manuel Olivera
Al-Taawoun	(North Macedonia) **Ertan Demiri**	(North Macedonia) **Šakir Redžepi**	(Slovenia) **Dejan Rusič**	(Jordan) Shadi Abu Hash'hash	(Egypt) Amir Azmy (Ivory Coast) Bamba Drissa (North Macedonia) Mensur Kurtiši
Al-Wehda	(Morocco) Issam Erraki	(Morocco) Youssef Kaddioui		(Jordan) **Suleiman Al-Salman**	(Bahrain) Hussain Ali Baba (Brazil) Felipe Campos (Morocco) Abdelkarim Benhania
Najran	(Brazil) Juliano Mineiro	(Democratic Republic of the Congo) Yves Diba Ilunga	(Senegal) Hamad Ji	(Jordan) Anas Bani Yaseen	

== League table ==
Pos	Team	Pld	W	D	L	GF	GA	GD	Pts	Qualification or relegation
1	Al-Hilal (C)	26	19	7	0	52	18	+34	64	Qualification for the Champions League group stage
2	Al-Ittihad	26	13	12	1	49	23	+26	51	Qualification for the Champions League group stage
3	Al-Ettifaq	26	15	3	8	45	30	+15	48	Qualification for the Champions League play-off round
4	Al-Shabab	26	13	7	6	42	30	+12	46	
5	Al-Nassr	26	11	10	5	44	34	+10	43	
6	Al-Ahli	26	11	4	11	48	41	+7	37	Qualification for the Champions League group stage (Note: Al-Ahli qualified for the Champions League group stage as 2011 King Cup of Champions winners.)
7	Al-Faisaly	26	10	5	11	39	47	−8	35	
8	Al-Taawoun	26	9	8	9	37	31	+6	32 (Note: Al-Taawoun and Al-Wehda were deducted 3 points for their deliberate delay of the kick-off time in the final round.)	
9	Al-Fateh	26	8	7	11	27	35	−8	31	
10	Al-Raed	26	7	9	10	31	40	−9	30	
11	Najran	26	8	2	16	33	52	−19	26	
12	Al-Qadsiah	26	4	11	11	31	39	−8	23	
13	Al-Wehda (R)	26	6	6	14	43	44	−1	21	Relegation to the First Division
14	Al-Hazem (R)	26	1	3	22	13	70	−57	6	Relegation to the First Division

Source: SLstat
Rules for classification: 1) Points; 2) Play-offs (only if needed to decide champion, teams for relegation or teams for international competitions); 3) Goal difference; 4) Goals scored.
(C) Champions; (R) Relegated

== Results ==
Home \ Away	AHL	ETT	FSY	FAT	HAZ	HIL	ITT	NSR	QAD	RAE	SHB	TWN	WHD	NAJ
Al-Ahli		5–1	3–0	1–2	1–0	1–1	1–3	0–0	2–1	1–2	1–2	1–1	3–2	2–1
Al-Ettifaq	4–3		1–0	2–2	2–1	2–3	2–2	3–0	1–0	2–2	1–0	1–0	3–0	1–0
Al-Faisaly	3–2	1–0		1–2	3–1	2–3	0–2	1–1	2–1	1–3	0–1	2–1	1–0	4–2
Al-Fateh	0–2	1–0	0–1		3–0	1–2	0–0	1–1	1–3	1–1	1–1	1–3	2–1	2–0
Al-Hazem	1–3	1–4	0–3	2–1		0–2	0–3	2–5	2–2	0–0	0–4	0–3	1–1	0–3
Al-Hilal	3–3	1–0	5–1	2–0	3–0		0–0	1–1	0–0	2–1	2–1	1–0	2–1	2–1
Al-Ittihad	2–0	2–1	3–3	2–0	4–0	0–0		5–2	2–2	3–0	2–2	0–1	1–1	2–0
Al-Nassr	2–1	2–1	3–2	4–2	2–1	0–1	2–2		0–0	1–0	0–0	2–2	0–1	6–1
Al-Qadsiah	1–3	0–3	2–2	0–1	1–0	0–2	1–1	1–3		1–1	1–1	4–1	1–1	2–3
Al-Raed	2–3	0–3	0–0	1–2	2–0	0–4	1–2	1–1	1–4		2–2	0–0	3–2	3–2
Al-Shabab	2–1	2–1	4–1	0–0	1–0	0–2	1–1	2–0	3–1	0–2		4–1	4–3	0–1
Al-Taawoun	2–1	0–1	4–1	0–0	2–0	2–2	0–1	2–2	1–1	1–0	4–1		1–2	2–3
Al-Wehda	1–3	0–1	3–3	3–0	8–1	1–3	1–2	1–3	0–0	2–3	1–2	0–0		2–0
Najran	2–1	2–4	0–1	2–1	4–0	0–3	2–2	0–1	2–1	0–0	1–2	0–3	1–5	

Updated to match(es) played on 20 May 2011. Source: SLstat.com
Legend: Blue = home team win; Yellow = draw; Red = away team win.

== Season statistics ==
=== Scoring ===
==== Top scorers ====
Rank	Player	Club	Goals
1	(Saudi Arabia) Nasser Al-Shamrani	Al-Shabab	17
2	(Brazil) Victor Simões	Al-Ahli	16
3	(Saudi Arabia) Mohammed Al-Rashid	Al-Taawoun / Al-Ittihad	14
3	(Saudi Arabia) Muhannad Assiri	Al-Wehda	14
3	(Saudi Arabia) Yousef Al-Salem	Al-Ettifaq	14
6	(Albania) Migen Memelli	Al-Faisaly	13
6	(Democratic Republic of the Congo) Yves Diba Ilunga	Najran	13
8	(Argentina) Sebastián Tagliabué	Al-Ettifaq	12
8	(Saudi Arabia) Naif Hazazi	Al-Ittihad	12
10	(Saudi Arabia) Yasser Al-Qahtani	Al-Hilal	11

==== Hat-tricks ====
Player	For	Against	Result	Date	Ref
(Saudi Arabia) Yasser Al-Qahtani	Al-Hilal	Al-Faisaly	5–1 (H)	25 August 2010	
(Saudi Arabia) Naif Hazazi	Al-Ittihad	Al-Hazem	4–0 (H)	29 August 2010	
(Saudi Arabia) Nasser Al-Shamrani	Al-Shabab	Al-Faisaly	4–1 (H)	11 November 2010	
(Saudi Arabia) Yasser Al-Qahtani	Al-Hilal	Al-Hazem	3–0 (H)	15 December 2010	
(Albania) Migen Memelli	Al-Faisaly	Al-Ittihad	3–3 (A)	16 December 2010	
(Saudi Arabia) Mukhtar Fallatah^{4}	Al-Wehda	Al-Hazem	8–1 (H)	24 February 2011	
(Saudi Arabia) Muhannad Assiri	Al-Wehda	Al-Hazem	8–1 (H)	24 February 2011	
(Saudi Arabia) Yousef Al-Salem	Al-Ettifaq	Najran	4–2 (A)	25 February 2011	
(Guinea) Alhassane Keita	Al-Shabab	Al-Hazem	4–0 (A)	1 April 2011	
(Brazil) Victor Simões	Al-Ahli	Al-Qadisiyah	3–1 (A)	2 April 2011	
(Nigeria) Nasigba John-Jumbo	Al-Qadisiyah	Al-Raed	4–1 (A)	22 April 2011	

Notes

^{4} Player scored 4 goals
(H) – Home team
(A) – Away team

=== Clean sheets ===
Rank	Player	Club	Clean sheets
1	(Saudi Arabia) Mabrouk Zaid	Al-Ittihad	9
2	(Saudi Arabia) Fayz Al-Sabiay	Al-Ettifaq	8
2	(Saudi Arabia) Hassan Al-Otaibi	Al-Hilal	8
4	(Saudi Arabia) Fahad Al-Thunayan	Al-Taawoun	6
5	(Saudi Arabia) Abdullah Al-Enezi	Al-Nassr	5
5	(Saudi Arabia) Waleed Abdullah	Al-Shabab	5
7	(Saudi Arabia) Awidhah Al-Aamri	Al-Faisaly	4
7	(Saudi Arabia) Mansoor Al-Najai	Al-Qadsiah	4
7	(Saudi Arabia) Mohammad Sharifi	Al-Fateh	4
7	(Saudi Arabia) Mohammed Al-Khojali	Al-Raed	4
7	(Saudi Arabia) Yasser Al-Mosailem	Al-Ahli	4

=== Discipline ===
==== Player ====
- Most yellow cards: 10
  - (Oman) Ahmed Kano (Al-Fateh)
- Most red cards: 2
  - (Brazil) Juliano Mineiro (Najran)
  - (Saudi Arabia) Fuad Al-Mutairi (Al-Hazem)
  - (Tunisia) Moïne Chaâbani (Al-Qadsiah)

==== Club ====
- Most yellow cards: 71
  - Al-Ettifaq
- Most red cards: 11
  - Al-Hazem

== Attendances ==
=== By team ===
Pos	Team	Total	High	Low	Average	Change
1	Al-Hilal	113,567	19,212	3,968	8,736	n/a
2	Al-Ittihad	98,112	15,758	648	7,547	n/a
3	Al-Ahli	97,770	16,350	1,158	7,521	n/a
4	Al-Raed	89,306	14,909	2,395	6,870	n/a
5	Al-Taawoun	87,002	15,160	2,610	6,692	n/a
6	Al-Nassr	82,830	14,750	1,603	6,372	n/a
7	Al-Ettifaq	57,138	21,174	628	4,395	n/a
8	Al-Fateh	27,142	9,281	50	2,088	n/a
9	Al-Qadsiah	26,508	9,361	100	2,039	n/a
10	Al-Wehda	25,628	8,060	110	1,971	n/a
11	Al-Shabab	22,481	9,366	46	1,729	n/a
12	Al-Faisaly	17,175	5,022	83	1,321	n/a
13	Najran	13,569	2,335	368	1,044	n/a
14	Al-Hazem	6,934	2,413	6	533	n/a
	League total	765,162	21,174	6	4,204	n/a

Updated to games played on 20 May 2011

== Awards ==
=== Arriyadiyah and Mobily Awards for Sports Excellence ===
The Arriyadiyah and Mobily Awards for Sports Excellence were awarded at the conclusion of the season for the fifth time since its inception in 2007. The awards were sponsored by Saudi newspaper Arriyadiyah and Saudi telecommunication company Mobily. The awards were presented on 11 September 2011.

Award	Winner	Club
Player of the Season	(gold) (Saudi Arabia) Mohammad Al-Shalhoub; (silver) (Saudi Arabia) Yahya Al-Shehri; (bronze) (Saudi Arabia) Bader Al-Khamees	Al-Hilal; Al-Ettifaq; Al-Taawoun
Young Player of the Season	(gold) (Saudi Arabia) Yasser Al-Shahrani; (silver) (Saudi Arabia) Abdullah Al-Sudairy; (bronze) (Saudi Arabia) Meshal Al-Enezi	Al-Qadisiyah; Al-Hilal; Al-Raed
Goldent Boot	(Saudi Arabia) Nasser Al-Shamrani	Al-Shabab

=== Al-Riyadiya Awards ===
The Al-Riyadiya Awards were awarded for the second time since its inception last year. The awards were presented on 15 June 2011.

- Best Goalkeeper: (Saudi Arabia) Hassan Al-Otaibi (Al-Hilal)
- Best defender: (Saudi Arabia) Osama Hawsawi (Al-Hilal)
- Best Midfielder: (Saudi Arabia) Mohammed Noor (Al-Ittihad)
- Best attacker: (Saudi Arabia) Nasser Al-Shamrani (Al-Shabab)
- Player of the Year: (Saudi Arabia) Hassan Al-Otaibi (Al-Hilal)

== See also ==
- 2010–11 Saudi First Division
- 2011 King Cup of Champions
- 2010–11 Saudi Crown Prince Cup
- 2012 AFC Champions League
