= 2011 Saudi Crown Prince Cup final =

- Event: 2010–11 Saudi Crown Prince Cup
Al-Wehda	Al-Hilal
0	5
- Date: 15 April 2011
- Venue: King Abdul Aziz Stadium, Mecca
- Referee: Carlos Velasco Carballo (Spain)
- Attendance: 28,000

The 2011 Saudi Crown Prince Cup final was the 36th final of the Crown Prince Cup. It took place on 15 April 2011 at the King Abdul Aziz Stadium in Makkah, Saudi Arabia and was contested between Al-Wehda and Al-Hilal. It was Al-Wehda's sixth Crown Prince Cup final and Al-Hilal's 11th final. This was the second meeting between these two clubs in the final. It was Al-Wehda's first final since 1973 and Al-Hilal's fourth final in a row.

Al-Hilal won the match 5–0 to claim their tenth Crown Prince Cup title and their fourth one in a row. By winning the match 5–0, Al-Hilal recorded the biggest victory in Crown Prince Cup finals.

== Teams ==
Team	Previous finals appearances (bold indicates winners)
Al-Hilal	10 (**1964**, **1995**, 1999, **2000**, **2003**, **2005**, **2006**, **2008**, **2009**, **2010**)
Al-Wehda	5 (1959, **1960**, 1964, 1970, 1973)

== Venue ==
The King Abdul Aziz Stadium was announced as the host of the final venue. This was the first Crown Prince Cup final to be hosted in the King Abdul Aziz Stadium as well as the first domestic final to be held in the stadium.

The King Abdul Aziz Stadium was opened in 1986. The stadium was used as a venue for the 2005 Islamic Solidarity Games and hosted the final. Its current capacity is 28,000 and it is used by Al-Wehda as a home stadium.

== Background ==
Prior to the final, the Saudi FF announced that they had redesigned the Crown Prince Cup trophy and that the new trophy would be handed to the winners of the final.

Al-Wehda reached their sixth final after defeating Al-Ettifaq 3–2 on penalties following their 2–2 draw. Al-Wehda became the first team to reach the final without winning a single match. They reached their first final since 1973 when they finished runners-up to Al-Nassr following a 2–1 defeat.

Al-Hilal reached their eleventh final after a 2–0 win against city rivals Al-Nassr. This was Al-Hilal's fourth final in a row.

This was the second meeting between these two sides in the Crown Prince Cup final. Al-Hilal won the match 4–3 in 1964. The two teams played each other twice in the season prior to the final with Al-Hilal winning both matches.

== Road to the final ==
Al-Wehda		Round	Al-Hilal
Opponent	Result		Opponent	Result
Al-Faisaly	1–1 (4–2 p) (H)	Round of 16	Najran	4–0 (H)
Al-Raed	1–1 (4–2 p) (A)	Quarter-finals	Al-Ahli	2–2 (4–3 p) (H)
Al-Ettifaq	2–2 (3–2 p) (H)	Semi-finals	Al-Nassr	2–0 (A)

Key: (H) = Home; (A) = Away

== Match ==
=== Details ===
15 April 2011
20:45 AST

Al-Wehda	0–5	Al-Hilal
	Report	Ali 24'; Al-Zori 63'; Al-Shalhoub 71'; Wilhelmsson 74'; Al-Abed 82'

King Abdul Aziz Stadium, Mecca
Attendance: 28,000
Referee: Carlos Velasco Carballo (Spain)

**Al-Wehda**	**Al-Hilal**

GK	1	(Saudi Arabia) Faisal Al-Merqeb
RB	2	(Jordan) Suleiman Al-Salman
CB	5	(Saudi Arabia) Majed Belal (c)
CB	28	(Saudi Arabia) Ibrahim Al-Zubaidi	(yellow card) 61'
LB	66	(Saudi Arabia) Adnan Fallatah
RM	16	(Morocco) Youssef Kaddioui		(substituted off) 78'
CM	31	(Saudi Arabia) Abdulkhaleq Barnawi
CM	6	(Morocco) Issam Erraki		(substituted off) 84'
LM	80	(Saudi Arabia) Salman Al-Moasher	(yellow card) 21'	(substituted off) 70'
CF	14	(Saudi Arabia) Muhannad Assiri
CF	7	(Saudi Arabia) Mukhtar Fallatah
Substitutes:
GK	40	(Saudi Arabia) Ahmed Al-Fahmi
DF	17	(Saudi Arabia) Sulaiman Amido
DF	70	(Saudi Arabia) Waleed Mahboob		(substituted on) 84'
MF	19	(Saudi Arabia) Khaled Al-Hazmi		(substituted on) 78'
MF	21	(Saudi Arabia) Majed Al-Hazzani
MF	71	(Saudi Arabia) Abdulaziz Al-Kalthem
FW	9	(Saudi Arabia) Salman Al-Sibyani		(substituted on) 70'
Manager:
(Egypt) Mokhtar Mokhtar

GK	30	(Saudi Arabia) Hassan Al-Otaibi
RB	12	(South Korea) Lee Young-pyo
CB	3	(Saudi Arabia) Osama Hawsawi
CB	25	(Saudi Arabia) Majed Al-Marshedi
LB	4	(Saudi Arabia) Abdullah Al-Zori
RM	15	(Saudi Arabia) Ahmed Al-Fraidi	(substituted off) 65'
CM	8	(Romania) Mirel Rădoi
CM	10	(Saudi Arabia) Mohammad Al-Shalhoub
LM	9	(Sweden) Christian Wilhelmsson	(substituted off) 77'
CF	18	(Egypt) Ahmed Ali	(substituted off) 76'
CF	20	(Saudi Arabia) Yasser Al-Qahtani (c)
Substitutes:
GK	22	(Saudi Arabia) Fahad Al-Shammari
DF	26	(Saudi Arabia) Salman Al-Khalidi
DF	35	(Saudi Arabia) Shafi Al-Dossari
MF	11	(Saudi Arabia) Abdullaziz Al-Dawsari	(substituted on) 76'
MF	21	(Saudi Arabia) Sultan Al-Bargan
MF	24	(Saudi Arabia) Nawaf Al Abed	(substituted on) 65'
FW	16	(Saudi Arabia) Essa Al-Mehyani	(substituted on) 77'
Manager:
(Argentina) Gabriel Calderón

Assistant referees:
Roberto Alonso Fernández (Spain)
Fermín Martínez (Spain)
Fourth official:
Abdulrahman Al-Amri

**Match rules**

- 90 minutes.
- 30 minutes of extra-time if necessary.
- Penalty shoot-out if scores still level.
- Seven named substitutes.
- Maximum of three substitutions.

== See also ==
- 2010–11 Saudi Crown Prince Cup
- 2010–11 Saudi Professional League
- 2011 King Cup of Champions
