= 2009–10 Saudi Crown Prince Cup =

2009–10 Crown Prince Cup
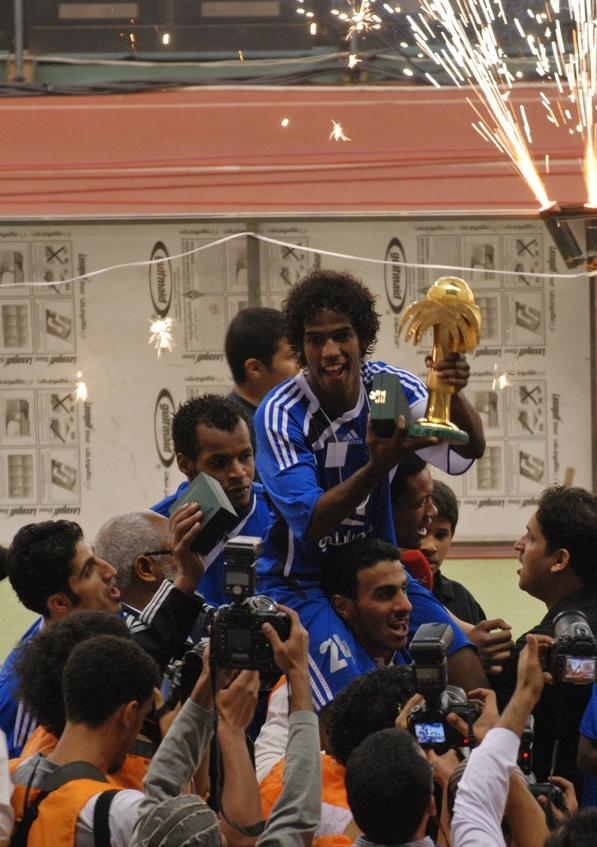
- Al-Hilal celebrating their ninth title

Tournament details
- Country: Saudi Arabia
- Dates: 6 November 2009 – 19 February 2010
- Teams: 54 (all); 42 (qualifying competition); 16 (main competition)

Final positions
- Champions: Al-Hilal (9th title)
- Runners-up: Al-Ahli

Tournament statistics
- Matches played: 15
- Goals scored: 51 (3.4 per match)
- Top goal scorer(s): Victor Simões (4 goals)
- All statistics correct as of 19 February 2010. (Note: All statistics do not include qualifying play-offs)

The 2009–10 Crown Prince Cup was the 35th season of the Saudi Crown Prince Cup since its establishment in 1957. This season's competition featured a total of 16 teams, 12 teams from the Pro League, and 4 teams from the qualifying rounds.

Al-Hilal were the two-time defending champions, having retained the trophy in 2009, and won their third consecutive title, defeating Al-Ahli in the final on 19 February 2010. Al-Hilal won their record-extending 9th title and their third title in a row.

== Qualifying rounds ==
All of the competing teams that are not members of the Pro League competed in the qualifying rounds to secure one of 4 available places in the Round of 16. First Division sides Al-Ansar, Al-Faisaly, Al-Tai and Hajer qualified.

=== Preliminary round 1 ===
The Preliminary Round 1 matches were played on 6 & 12 November 2009.

Home team (tier)	Score	Away team (tier)
Friday 6 November 2009
Al-Majd (4)	2–0	Al-Suqoor (4)
Al-Nakhil (4)	5–2	Al-Ain (4)
Al-Qala (4)	7–0	Al-Waad (4)
Al-Rawdhah (4)	3–3 (4–2 p)	Al-Hada (4)
Al-Saqr (4)	4–4 (3–4 p)	Afif (4)
Thursday 12 November 2009
Sharurah (4)	0–4	Al-Tuhami (4)

=== Preliminary round 2 ===
The Preliminary Round 2 matches were played on 13 & 17 November 2009.

Home team (tier)	Score	Away team (tier)
Friday 13 November 2009
Al-Majd (4)	3–5 (a.e.t.)	Okaz (4)
Al-Rawdhah (4)	4–3	Afif (4)
Al-Qala (4)	2–1 (a.e.t.)	Al-Hait (4)
Tuesday 17 November 2009
Al-Tuhami (4)	0–1	Al-Nakhil (4)

=== First round ===
The First Round matches were played on 3 & 4 December 2009.

Home team (tier)	Score	Away team (tier)
Thursday 3 December 2009
Al-Adalah (2)	2–0	Al-Jeel (3)
Al-Khaleej (2)	3–0	Al-Nahda (3)
Al-Riyadh (2)	2–1	Al-Diriyah (3)
Al-Hamadah (3)	2–7	Al-Faisaly (2)
Al-Fayha (3)	2–1	Najd (3)
Sdoos (3)	1–0	Al-Shoulla (2)
Al-Taawoun (2)	2–1	Al-Arabi (3)
Hajer (2)	1–0	Al-Rawdhah (4)
Friday 4 December 2009
Al-Batin (3)	1–0	Al-Najma (3)
Al-Orobah (3)	0–2	Al-Tai (2)
Abha (2)	3–2	Al-Nakhil (4)
Al-Jabalain (3)	1–3	Al-Qala (4)
Hetten (2)	1–2	Ohod (2)
Al-Akhdoud (3)	2–3	Damac (2)
Al-Ansar (2)	3–0	Al-Rabe'e (3)
Al-Watani (2)	2–1	Okaz (4)

=== Second round ===
The Second Round matches were played on 10 December 2009.

Home team (tier)	Score	Away team (tier)
Thursday 10 December 2009
Hajer (2)	2–1	Al-Riyadh (2)
Al-Khaleej (2)	2–1	Al-Adalah (2)
Al-Fayha (3)	1–2	Al-Taawoun (2)
Sdoos (3)	0–2	Al-Faisaly (2)
Al-Batin (3)	3–0 (a.e.t.)	Al-Qala (4)
Al-Tai (2)	3–0	Al-Watani (2)
Abha (2)	0–1	Damac (2)
Al-Ansar (2)	3–0	Ohod (2)

=== Final round ===
The Final Round matches were played on 17 December 2009.

Home team (tier)	Score	Away team (tier)
Tuesday 17 December 2009
Al-Khaleej (2)	1–2	Hajer (2)
Al-Faisaly (2)	2–1	Al-Taawoun (2)
Al-Batin (3)	3–3 (10–11 p)	Al-Tai (2)
Al-Ansar (2)	3–2	Damac (2)

== Bracket ==
Round of 16
H	Al-Qadisiyah	1
A	Al-Shabab	2
H	Al-Wehda	1 (4)
A	Al-Tai (p)	1 (5)
H	Hajer	2
A	Al-Ahli	3
H	Al-Fateh (a.e.t.)	3
A	Al-Ettifaq	1
H	Al-Hilal	2
A	Al-Faisaly	1
H	Al-Raed	0
A	Al-Nassr	2
H	Najran	2
A	Al-Ittihad	1
H	Al-Ansar (a.e.t.)	4
A	Al-Hazm	2

Quarter-finals
H	Al-Shabab	3
A	Al-Tai	1
A	Al-Ahli	2
H	Al-Fateh	0
A	Al-Hilal (a.e.t.)	2
H	Al-Nassr	1
A	Najran (a.e.t.)	3
H	Al-Ansar	1

Semi-finals
H	Al-Shabab	2 (1)
A	Al-Ahli (p)	2 (3)
H	Al-Hilal	2
A	Najran	1

Final
-	Al-Ahli	1
-	Al-Hilal	2

Note: H: Home team, A: Away team

== Round of 16 ==
The Round of 16 fixtures were played on 3, 4 and 5 February 2010. All times are local, AST (UTC+3).

3 February 2010 4	Al-Fateh (1)	3–1 (a.e.t.)	Al-Ettifaq (1)	Al-Hasa
20:10	Sufyani 58'; Al-Jamaan 93' (pen.); Bettayeb 100'	Report	Al-Salem 38'	Stadium: Prince Abdullah bin Jalawi Stadium; Referee: Mutraf Al-Qahtani

4 February 2010 1	Al-Qadisiyah (1)	1–2	Al-Shabab (1)	Khobar
20:10	John-Jumbo 31'	Report	Al-Gizani 38'; Camacho 55'	Stadium: Prince Saud bin Jalawi Stadium; Referee: Abdullah Al-Qahtani

4 February 2010 3	Hajer (2)	2–3	Al-Ahli (1)	Al-Hasa
20:10	Al-Khoudari 41'; Al-Mouathin 73'	Report	Al-Raheb 9'; Massad 24'; Simões 39'	Stadium: Prince Abdullah bin Jalawi Stadium; Referee: Fahad Al-Oraini

4 February 2010 5	Al-Hilal (1)	2–1	Al-Faisaly (2)	Riyadh
20:10	Wilhelmsson 56'; Balghaith 70' (o.g.)	Report	Fallatah 88'	Stadium: Prince Faisal bin Fahd Stadium; Referee: Abbas Ibrahim

4 February 2010 6	Al-Raed (1)	0–2	Al-Nassr (1)	Buraidah
20:10		Report	Ghaly 65', 84'	Stadium: King Abdullah Sport City Stadium; Referee: Khalil Al-Ghamdi

5 February 2010 2	Al-Wehda (1)	1–1 (a.e.t.) (4–5 p)	Al-Tai (2)	Makkah
20:10	Benhenia 9' (pen.)		Al-Juhaim 60'	Stadium: King Abdul Aziz Stadium; Referee: Khaled Al-Zahrani
	Penalties
	Al-Mor (penalty scored); Assiri (penalty scored); Belal (penalty missed); K. Al-Mousa (penalty scored); Rafik (penalty scored); Mahboob (penalty missed)		(penalty scored) Kaddadi; (penalty scored) Al-Juhaim; (penalty scored) Al-Matar; (penalty scored) Al-Saqri; (penalty missed) Rashid; (penalty scored) Al-Harbi

5 February 2010 7	Najran (1)	2–1	Al-Ittihad (1)	Najran
20:10	Diba 43', 65' (pen.)	Report	Noor 67' (pen.)	Stadium: Al Akhdoud Club Stadium; Referee: Marai Al-Awaji

5 February 2010 8	Al-Ansar (2)	4–2 (a.e.t.)	Al-Hazem (1)	Medina
20:10	Al-Khodair 12', 71', 110'; Al-Eisa 120+4' (pen.)	Report	Al-Muwallad 72' (pen.); Hamad Ji 87'	Stadium: Prince Mohammed bin Abdul Aziz Stadium; Referee: Mansour Al-Shammari

== Quarter-finals ==
The Quarter-finals fixtures were played on 9 and 10 February 2010. All times are local, AST (UTC+3).

9 February 2010 9	Al-Shabab (1)	3–1	Al-Tai (2)	Riyadh
20:15	Al-Yousef 26', 36'; Camacho 77'	Report	Fallatah 55'	Stadium: King Fahd International Stadium; Referee: Saad Al-Kathairi

9 February 2010 10	Al-Fateh (1)	0–2	Al-Ahli (1)	Al-Hasa
20:15		Report	Simões 61', 64'	Stadium: Prince Abdullah bin Jalawi Stadium

10 February 2010 11	Al-Nassr (1)	1–2 (a.e.t.)	Al-Hilal (1)	Riyadh
20:15	Feindouno 56'	Report	Neves 61'; Wilhelmsson 113'	Stadium: King Fahd International Stadium; Referee: Marius Avram (Romania)

10 February 2010 12	Al-Ansar (2)	1–3 (a.e.t.)	Najran (1)	Medina
20:15	Mosaed 19' (o.g.)	Report	Abu Yabis 40'; Diba 109'; Al-Najrani 116'	Stadium: Prince Mohammed bin Abdul Aziz Stadium; Referee: Abdulrahman Al-Amri

== Semi-finals ==
The Semi-finals fixtures were played on 14 and 15 February 2010. All times are local, AST (UTC+3).

14 February 2010 13	Al-Shabab (1)	2–2 (a.e.t.) (1–3 p)	Al-Ahli (1)	Riyadh
20:15	Al-Sultan 55'; Al-Gizani 68'	Report	Al-Musa 26'; Jaizawi 86'	Stadium: Prince Faisal bin Fahd Stadium; Referee: Alexandru Tudor (Romania)
	Penalties
	Camacho (penalty missed); Ahmed Otaif (penalty missed); Ali Otaif (penalty scored); Al-Haqbani (penalty missed)		(penalty missed) Marcinho; (penalty scored) Al-Safri; (penalty scored) Al-Musa; (penalty missed) Al-Fahmi; (penalty scored) Kano

15 February 2010 14	Al-Hilal (1)	2–1	Najran (1)	Riyadh
20:15	Al-Qahtani 18', 52'	Report	Abu Yabis 57'	Stadium: Prince Faisal bin Fahd Stadium; Referee: Alexandru Deaconu (Romania)

== Final ==
The final was held on 19 February 2010 in the King Fahd International Stadium in Riyadh. All times are local, AST (UTC+3).

19 February 2010
20:15

Al-Ahli	1–2	Al-Hilal
Simões 43'	Report	Wilhelmsson 66'; Neves 78'

King Fahd International Stadium, Riyadh
Referee: Massimo Busacca (Switzerland)

=== Winner ===
2009–10 Crown Prince Cup
Winners
Al-Hilal
9th Title

== Top goalscorers ==
As of 19 February 2010

Rank	Player	Club	Goals
1	(Brazil) Victor Simões	Al-Ahli	4
2	(Saudi Arabia) Turki Al-Khodair	Al-Ansar	3
2	(Democratic Republic of the Congo) Yves Diba Ilunga	Najran	3
2	(Sweden) Christian Wilhelmsson	Al-Hilal	3

== See also ==
- 2009–10 Saudi Professional League
- 2010 King Cup of Champions
