= 2010 Saudi Crown Prince Cup final =

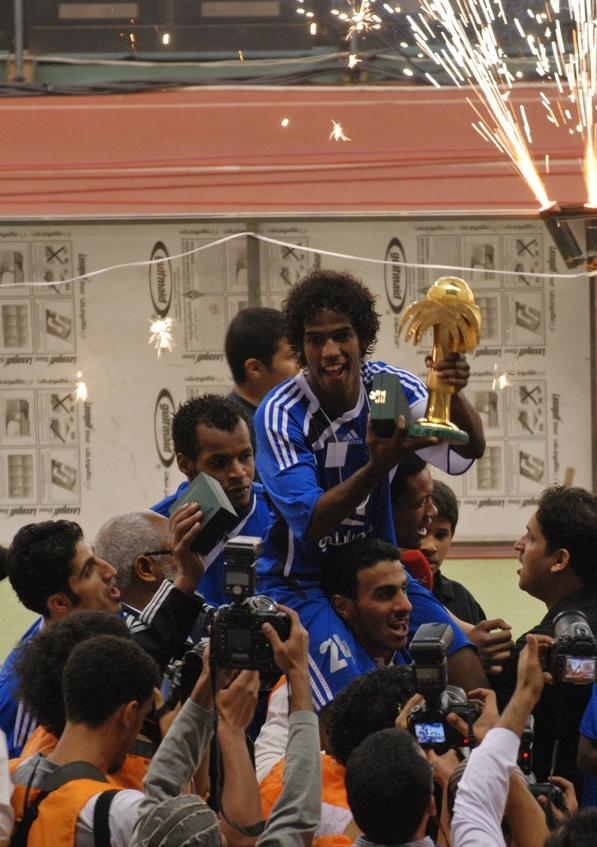
- Al-Hilal celebrating their ninth title
- Event: 2009–10 Saudi Crown Prince Cup
Al-Ahli	Al-Hilal
1	2
- Date: 19 February 2010
- Venue: King Fahd International Stadium, Riyadh
- Referee: Massimo Busacca (Switzerland)
- Attendance: 60,000

The 2010 Saudi Crown Prince Cup final was the 35th final of the Crown Prince Cup. It took place on 19 February 2010 at the King Fahd International Stadium in Riyadh, Saudi Arabia and was contested between Al-Ahli and Al-Hilal. It was Al-Ahli's 11th Crown Prince Cup final and Al-Hilal's 10th final. This was the third meeting between these two clubs in the final. It was Al-Ahli's first final since 2007 and Al-Hilal's third final in a row.

Al-Hilal won the match 2–1 to claim their ninth Crown Prince Cup title and third one in a row.

== Teams ==
Team	Previous finals appearances (bold indicates winners)
Al-Ahli	10 (**1957**, 1958, **1970**, 1974, **1998**, **2002**, 2003, 2004, 2006, **2007**)
Al-Hilal	9 (**1964**, **1995**, 1999, **2000**, **2003**, **2005**, **2006**, **2008**, **2009**)

== Venue ==
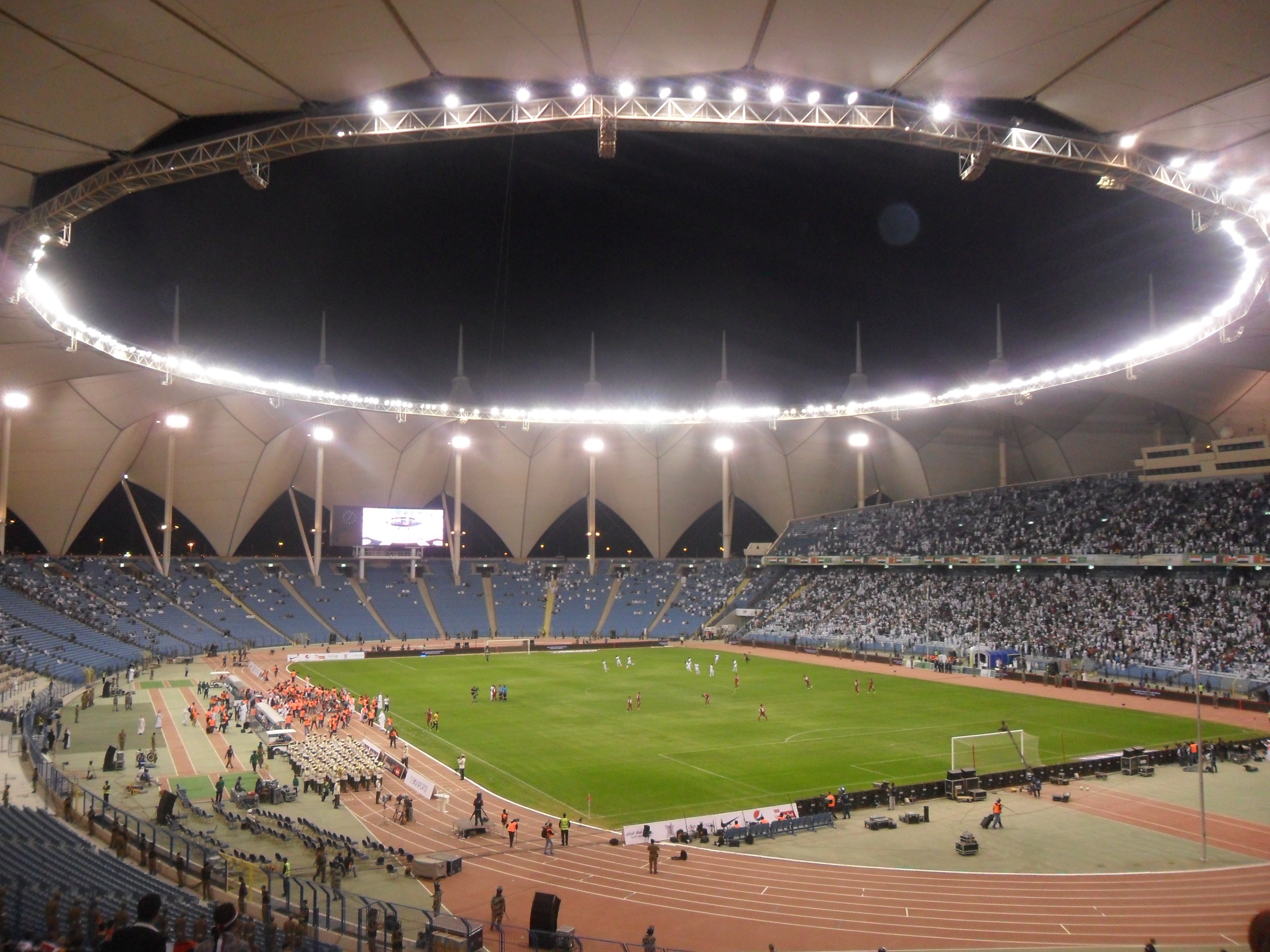
The King Fahd International Stadium in Riyadh hosted the final

The King Fahd International Stadium was announced as the host of the final venue. This was the tenth Crown Prince Cup final hosted in the King Fahd International Stadium following those in 1992, 1994, 1998, 2003, 2004, 2005, 2006, 2008 and 2009.

The King Fahd International Stadium was built in 1982 and was opened in 1987. The stadium was used as a venue for the 1992, 1995, and the 1997 editions of the FIFA Confederations Cup. Its current capacity is 68,752 and it is used by the Saudi Arabia national football team, Al-Nassr, Al-Shabab, and major domestic matches.

== Background ==
Al-Ahli reached their eleventh final, after a defeating Al-Shabab 3–1 on penalties. They reached their first final since 2007 when they won the tournament after defeating Al-Ittihad 2–1.

Al-Hilal reached their tenth final after a 2–1 win against Najran. This was Al-Hilal's third final in a row.

This was the third meeting between these two sides in the Crown Prince Cup final. Al-Hilal won twice in 2003 and 2006. The two teams played each other three times in the season prior to the final with Al-Hilal winning all 3 matches. Twice in the League, 2–1 and 3–1, and once in the Federation Cup semi-final, 4–3.

== Road to the final ==
Al-Ahli		Round	Al-Hilal
Opponent	Result		Opponent	Result
Hajer	3–2 (A)	Round of 16	Al-Faisaly	2–1 (H)
Al-Fateh	2–0 (A)	Quarter-finals	Al-Nassr	2–1 (a.e.t.) (A)
Al-Shabab	2–2 (3–1 p) (A)	Semi-finals	Najran	2–1 (H)

Key: (H) = Home; (A) = Away

== Match ==
=== Details ===
19 February 2010
20:15 AST

Al-Ahli	1–2	Al-Hilal
Simões 43'	Report	Wilhelmsson 66'; Neves 78'

King Fahd International Stadium, Riyadh
Attendance: 60,000
Referee: Massimo Busacca (Switzerland)

**Al-Ahli**	**Al-Hilal**

GK	22	(Saudi Arabia) Abdullah Al-Mayouf
RB	14	(Saudi Arabia) Mohammad Massad (c)
CB	19	(Saudi Arabia) Walid Jahdali	(yellow card) 70'
CB	28	(Saudi Arabia) Jufain Al-Bishi
LB	31	(Saudi Arabia) Mansoor Al-Harbi	(yellow card) 70'
RM	5	(Saudi Arabia) Moataz Al-Musa
CM	13	(Saudi Arabia) Ala Rishani	(yellow card) 51'	(substituted off) 84'
CM	17	(Saudi Arabia) Mohammed Al-Safri		(substituted off) 70'
LM	10	(Brazil) Marcinho
CF	9	(Saudi Arabia) Malek Mouath		(substituted off) 68'
CF	7	(Brazil) Victor Simões
Substitutes:
FW	11	(Saudi Arabia) Hassan Al-Raheb		(substituted in) 84'
MF	16	(Saudi Arabia) Waleed Bakshween		(substituted in) 70'
MF	24	(Saudi Arabia) Abdulrahim Jaizawi		(substituted in) 68'
Manager:
(Brazil) Sérgio Farias

GK	30	(Saudi Arabia) Hassan Al-Otaibi
RB	12	(South Korea) Lee Young-pyo	(yellow card) 54'
CB	3	(Saudi Arabia) Osama Hawsawi
CB	25	(Saudi Arabia) Majed Al-Marshedi
LB	4	(Saudi Arabia) Abdullah Al-Zori
CM	6	(Saudi Arabia) Khaled Aziz
CM	8	(Romania) Mirel Rădoi	(yellow card) 89'
RW	10	(Saudi Arabia) Mohammad Al-Shalhoub		(substituted off) 68'
AM	7	(Brazil) Thiago Neves		(substituted off) 90'
LW	9	(Sweden) Christian Wilhelmsson
CF	20	(Saudi Arabia) Yasser Al-Qahtani (c)
Substitutes:
MF	13	(Saudi Arabia) Omar Al-Ghamdi		(substituted in) 90'
MF	24	(Saudi Arabia) Nawaf Al Abed		(substituted in) 68'
Manager:
(Belgium) Eric Gerets

**Match rules**

- 90 minutes.
- 30 minutes of extra-time if necessary.
- Penalty shoot-out if scores still level.
- Seven named substitutes.
- Maximum of three substitutions.

== See also ==
- 2009–10 Saudi Crown Prince Cup
- 2009–10 Saudi Professional League
- 2010 King Cup of Champions
