= 2010–11 Saudi Crown Prince Cup =

2010–11 Crown Prince Cup
Tournament details
- Country: Saudi Arabia
- Dates: 23 September 2010 – 15 April 2011
- Teams: 64 (all); 50 (qualifying competition); 16 (main competition)

Final positions
- Champions: Al-Hilal (10th title)
- Runners-up: Al-Wehda

Tournament statistics
- Matches played: 15
- Goals scored: 53 (3.53 per match)
- Top goal scorer(s): Abdulrahman Al-Qahtani (3 goals)
- All statistics correct as of 15 April 2011. (Note: All statistics do not include qualifying play-offs)

The 2010–11 Saudi Crown Prince Cup was the 36th season of the Saudi Crown Prince Cup since its establishment in 1957. This season's competition featured a total of 16 teams, 14 teams from the Pro League, and 2 teams from the qualifying rounds.

Pro League side Al-Hilal were the defending champions and successfully defended their title. Al-Hilal won their fourth Crown Prince Cup title in a row and tenth in total after beating Al-Wehda 5–0 in the final.

== Qualifying rounds ==
All of the competing teams that are not members of the Pro League competed in the qualifying rounds to secure one of 2 available places in the Round of 16. First Division sides Al-Riyadh and Hajer qualified.

=== Preliminary round 1 ===
The Preliminary Round 1 matches were played on 23 September 2010.

Home team (tier)	Score	Away team (tier)
Thursday 23 September 2010
Al-Ain (4)	3–1	Sharurah (4)
Al-Jandal (4)	4–4 (5–4 p)	Al-Tadamon (4)

=== Preliminary round 2 ===
The Preliminary Round 2 matches were played on 29 & 30 September and 1 October 2010.

Home team (tier)	Score	Away team (tier)
Wednesday 29 September 2010
Al-Diriyah (3)	1–6	Heraa (4)
Al-Akhdoud (3)	4–4 (5–4 p)	Al-Tuhami (4)
Al-Zaytoon (3)	1–4	Al-Shaheed (4)
Al-Nakhil (3)	4–0	Al-Ain (4)
Al-Hait (3)	5–1	Radhwah (4)
Thursday 30 September 2010
Sdoos (3)	5–2	Al-Sahari (4)
Al-Batin (3)	1–4	Najd (3)
Al-Hamadah (3)	5–1	Al-Badaya (3)
Al-Arabi (3)	7–1	Al-Amal (4)
Al-Kawkab (3)	3–1	Al-Ardh (3)
Friday 1 October 2010
Al-Oyoon (3)	4–5	Al-Nojoom (4)
Al-Nahda (3)	8–0	Al-Alameen (4)
Al-Fayha (3)	1–3 (a.e.t.)	Al-Taqadom (3)
Al-Jabalain (3)	3–0	Jubbah (4)
Al-Qala (3)	2–1	Al-Jandal (4)
Al-Suqoor (3)	7–0	Al-Khaldi (4)

=== First round ===
The First Round matches were played on 6, 7, & 8 October 2010.

Home team (tier)	Score	Away team (tier)
Wednesday 6 October 2010
Abha (2)	4–1	Al-Shaheed (4)
Ohod (2)	5–0	Al-Hait (3)
Al-Rabe'e (2)	3–1	Heraa (4)
Damac (2)	2–1	Al-Nakhil (3)
Hetten (2)	1–0	Al-Akhdoud (3)
Thursday 7 October 2010
Al-Adalah (2)	0–1	Al-Hamadah (3)
Al-Riyadh (2)	5–0	Sdoos (3)
Al-Shoulla (2)	1–0	Al-Kawkab (3)
Al-Ansar (2)	1–0 (a.e.t.)	Al-Arabi (3)
Al-Jeel (2)	3–1	Najd (3)
Friday 8 October 2010
Hajer (2)	6–2	Al-Nojoom (4)
Al-Khaleej (2)	3–2	Al-Nahda (3)
Al-Najma (2)	0–3	Al-Taqadom (3)
Al-Tai (2)	1–1 (4–2 p)	Al-Jabalain (3)
Al-Orobah (2)	1–0	Al-Qala (3)
Al-Watani (2)	4–2	Al-Suqoor (3)

=== Second round ===
The Second Round matches were played on 20 & 21 October 2010.

Home team (tier)	Score	Away team (tier)
Wednesday 20 October 2010
Al-Riyadh (2)	3–0	Al-Shoulla (2)
Abha (2)	2–1	Hetten (2)
Ohod (2)	4–3 (a.e.t.)	Al-Ansar (2)
Damac (2)	6–5 (a.e.t.)	Al-Rabe'e (2)
Thursday 21 October 2010
Al-Jeel (2)	3–3 (5–4 p)	Al-Hamadah (3)
Al-Tai (2)	0–1	Al-Taqadom (3)
Al-Watani (2)	5–1	Al-Orobah (2)
Hajer (2)	1–0	Al-Khaleej (2)

=== Third round ===
The Third Round matches were played on 31 October 2010.

Home team (tier)	Score	Away team (tier)
Sunday 31 October 2010
Hajer (2)	2–1 (a.e.t.)	Al-Jeel (2)
Al-Riyadh (2)	3–1	Ohod (2)
Damac (2)	3–0	Abha (2)
Al-Watani (2)	4–0	Al-Taqadom (3)

=== Final round ===
The final round matches were played on 9 and 27 November 2010.

Home team (tier)	Score	Away team (tier)
Tuesday 9 November 2010
Damac (2)	2–4 (a.e.t.)	Al-Riyadh (2)
Saturday 27 November 2010
Hajer (2)	2–1	Al-Watani (2)

== Bracket ==
Round of 16
H	Al-Ittihad	3
A	Al-Taawoun	0
H	Al-Fateh	1
A	Al-Ettifaq	2
H	Al-Shabab	2
A	Al-Raed	3
H	Al-Wehda (pen.)	1 (4)
A	Al-Faisaly	1 (2)
H	Al-Nassr	5
A	Al-Qadisiyah	1
H	Al-Riyadh	4
A	Al-Hazem	0
H	Al-Hilal	4
A	Najran	0
H	Hajer	1 (2)
A	Al-Ahli (pen.)	1 (4)

Quarter-finals
A	Al-Ittihad	1
H	Al-Ettifaq (aet)	3
H	Al-Raed	1 (2)
A	Al-Wehda (pen.)	1 (4)
A	Al-Nassr	2
H	Al-Riyadh	1
H	Al-Hilal (pen.)	2 (4)
A	Al-Ahli	2 (3)

Semi-finals
A	Al-Ettifaq	2 (2)
H	Al-Wehda (pen.)	2 (3)
H	Al-Nassr	0
A	Al-Hilal	2

Final
–	Al-Wehda	0
–	Al-Hilal	5

Note: H: Home team, A: Away team

== Round of 16 ==
The Round of 16 fixtures were played on 31 January and 1, 2 and 3 February 2011. All times are local, AST (UTC+3).

31 January 2011 2	Al-Fateh (1)	1–2	Al-Ettifaq (1)	Al-Hasa
20:10	Sufyani 18'	Report	Al-Mubarak 40'; Al-Salem 79'	Stadium: Prince Abdullah bin Jalawi Stadium; Referee: Fahad Al-Mirdasi

31 January 2011 6	Al-Riyadh (2)	4–0	Al-Hazem (1)	Riyadh
20:10	Al-Dossari 15', 89'; Al-Otaibi 44'; Muaaz 79' (pen.)	Report		Stadium: King Fahd International Stadium; Referee: Mohammed Al-Nuhait

1 February 2011 1	Al-Ittihad (1)	3–0	Al-Taawoun (1)	Jeddah
20:10	Noor 43' (pen.); Hazazi 54', 72'	Report		Stadium: Prince Abdullah Al Faisal Stadium; Referee: Saad Al-Kathairi

1 February 2011 7	Al-Hilal (1)	4–0	Najran (1)	Riyadh
20:10	Hawsawi 9'; Al-Qahtani 57', 78' (pen.); Al-Gizani 90'	Report		Stadium: Prince Faisal bin Fahd Stadium; Referee: Abdulrahman Al-Amri

2 February 2011 3	Al-Shabab (1)	2–3	Al-Raed (1)	Riyadh
20:10	Al-Shamrani 14', 18'	Report	Al-Ruwaili 2'; Aqqal 47'; Sharahili 68'	Stadium: Prince Faisal bin Fahd Stadium; Referee: Abbas Ibrahim

2 February 2011 8	Hajer (2)	1–1 (a.e.t.) (2–4 p)	Al-Ahli (1)	Al-Hasa
20:10 (UTC+03:00)	Al-Showaish 55'	Report	Al-Musa 14'	Stadium: Prince Abdullah bin Jalawi Stadium; Referee: Yahya Hazazi
	Penalties
	Al-Rejaib (penalty scored); Bo Shaqra (penalty scored); Al-Enezi (penalty missed); Al-Showaish (penalty missed)		(penalty scored) Marcinho; (penalty scored) Al-Bishi; (penalty scored) Al-Harbi; (penalty scored) Mouath

3 February 2011 4	Al-Wehda (1)	1–1 (a.e.t.) (4–2 p)	Al-Faisaly (1)	Mecca
20:10	Fallatah 74'	Report	Madkhali 19'	Stadium: King Abdul Aziz Stadium; Referee: Mansour Al-Shammari

3 February 2011 5	Al-Nassr (1)	5–1	Al-Qadisiyah (1)	Riyadh
20:10	Al-Mutawa 24'; Al-Qahtani 42' (pen.), 75'; Figueroa 55'; Hamood 65'	Report	Chaâbani 33'	Stadium: Prince Faisal bin Fahd Stadium; Referee: Mutraf Al-Qahtani

== Quarter-finals ==
The Quarter-finals fixtures were played on 16 and 17 February 2011. All times are local, AST (UTC+3).

16 February 2011 10	Al-Raed (1)	1–1 (a.e.t.) (2–4 p)	Al-Wehda (1)	Buraidah
20:15	Al-Sagoor 35'	Report	Assiri 60'	Stadium: King Abdullah Sport City Stadium; Referee: Abbas Ibrahim
	Penalties
	Aqqal (penalty missed); Al-Qarni (penalty scored); Al-Ruwaili (penalty scored); Saad (penalty missed)		(penalty scored) Fallatah; (penalty scored) Al-Salman; (penalty scored) Erraki; (penalty scored) Fallatah

16 February 2011 12	Al-Hilal (1)	2–2 (a.e.t.) (4–3 p)	Al-Ahli (1)	Riyadh
20:15	Ali 19'; Al-Fraidi 43'	Report	Mouath 50'; Victor 53'	Stadium: King Fahd International Stadium; Referee: Khalil Al-Ghamdi
	Penalties
	Al-Shalhoub (penalty scored); Lee (penalty missed); Al-Gizani (penalty scored); Al-Abed (penalty missed); Hawsawi (penalty scored); Al-Qarni (penalty scored)		(penalty scored) Marcinho; (penalty scored) Petković; (penalty scored) Al-Bishi; (penalty missed) Mouath; (penalty missed) Al-Mor; (penalty missed) Victor

17 February 2011 9	Al-Ettifaq (1)	3–1 (a.e.t.)	Al-Ittihad (1)	Dammam
20:15	Al-Salem 19'; Tagliabué 93'; Al-Mubarak 111'	Report	Al-Saqri 56'	Stadium: Prince Mohamed bin Fahd Stadium; Referee: Fahad Al-Mirdasi

17 February 2011 11	Al-Riyadh (2)	1–2	Al-Nassr (1)	Riyadh
20:15	Muaaz 86'	Report	Al-Qahtani 7'; Hamood 57'	Stadium: King Fahd International Stadium; Referee: Marai Al-Awaji

== Semi-finals ==
The Semi-finals fixtures were played on 10 and 11 March 2011. All times are local, AST (UTC+3).

10 March 2011 14	Al-Nassr (1)	0–2	Al-Hilal (1)	Riyadh
20:35		Report	Rădoi 19'; Al-Fraidi 54'	Stadium: King Fahd International Stadium; Referee: Jérôme Laperrière (Switzerland)

11 March 2011 13	Al-Wehda (1)	2–2 (a.e.t.) (3–2 p)	Al-Ettifaq (1)	Mecca
20:35	Kaddioui 27'; Erraki 63' (pen.)	Report	Tagliabué 49'; Al-Bishi 81'	Stadium: King Abdul Aziz Stadium; Referee: Ilias Spathas (Greece)
	Penalties
	Fallatah (penalty missed); Kaddioui (penalty scored); Erraki (penalty scored); Al-Sibyani (penalty scored)		(penalty missed) Bruno; (penalty scored) Al-Jamaan; (penalty missed) Mateus; (penalty scored) Al-Shehri; (penalty missed) Mudhafar

== Final ==
The final was held on 15 April 2011 in the King Fahd International Stadium in Riyadh. All times are local, AST (UTC+3).

15 April 2011
20:45

Al-Wehda	0–5	Al-Hilal
	Report	Ali 24'; Al-Zori 63'; Al-Shalhoub 71'; Wilhelmsson 74'; Al-Abed 82'

King Abdul Aziz Stadium, Mecca
Attendance: 28,000
Referee: Carlos Velasco (Spain)

=== Winner ===
2010–11 Crown Prince Cup
Winners
Al-Hilal
10th Title

== Top goalscorers ==
As of 15 April 2011

Rank	Player	Club	Goals
1	(Saudi Arabia) Abdulrahman Al-Qahtani	Al-Nassr	3
2	11 Players		2

== See also ==
- 2011 Saudi Crown Prince Cup Final
- 2010–11 Saudi Professional League
- 2011 King Cup of Champions
