= 2008 GCC U-23 Championship =

البطولة الخليجية للمنتخبات تحت 23 سنة لكرة القدم (in Arabic)

Tournament details
- Host country: Saudi Arabia
- Dates: 6–17 January
- Teams: 5 (from 1 confederation)
- Venue: 1 (in 1 host city)

Final positions
- Champions: Saudi Arabia (1st title)
- Runners-up: Bahrain
- Third place: Qatar
- Fourth place: Oman

Tournament statistics
- Matches played: 10
- Goals scored: 28 (2.8 per match)
- Top scorer(s): (Qatar) Mousa Al Allaq (Qatar) Hamid Ismail (Saudi Arabia) Yousef Al-Salem (3 goals each)
- Best player: (Qatar) Hamid Ismail
- Best goalkeeper: (Saudi Arabia) Waleed Abdullah
- Fair play award: Saudi Arabia

The 2008 GCC U-23 Championship took place in Riyadh, Saudi Arabia for the first time. Five nations took part. The competition was held in Riyadh from 6 to 17 January. Saudi Arabia won the title after defeating Bahrain 1–0 on the final matchday.

== Venues ==
2008 GCC U-23 Championship is located in Saudi Arabia	Riyadh
2008 GCC U-23 Championship is located in Saudi Arabia	Prince Faisal bin Fahd Stadium
2008 GCC U-23 Championship is located in Saudi Arabia	Capacity: 22,500

== Teams ==
Team	Previous appearances in tournament (Note: Bold indicates champion for that year.)
Bahrain	0 (debut)
Kuwait	0 (debut)
Qatar	0 (debut)
Oman	0 (debut)
Saudi Arabia (host)	0 (debut)

== Tournament ==
The teams played a single round-robin style competition. The team achieving first place in the overall standings was the tournament winner.

All times are local, AST (UTC+3).

Team	Pld	W	D	L	GF	GA	GD	Pts
Saudi Arabia	4	3	1	0	7	2	+5	**10**
Bahrain	4	2	1	1	6	4	+2	**7**
Qatar	4	1	2	1	8	5	+3	**5**
Oman	4	1	0	3	4	7	–3	**3**
Kuwait	4	1	0	3	3	10	–7	**3**

== Matches ==
6 January 2008
19:45

Oman	0–1	Saudi Arabia
	Report	Al-Salem 51'

Prince Faisal bin Fahd Stadium, Riyadh
7 January 2008
19:45

Kuwait	2–1	Qatar
Al-Awadi 74'; Zaki 76'		Ismail 28'

Prince Faisal bin Fahd Stadium, Riyadh

8 January 2008
19:45

Bahrain	2–1	Oman
Al-Dakeel 25'; Gambar 82'		M. Al-Balushi 62'

Prince Faisal bin Fahd Stadium, Riyadh
10 January 2008
16:35

Qatar	2–2	Saudi Arabia
Ismail 44'; Al Yazeedi 75'	Report	Al-Dawsari 56'; Al-Kalthem 90+3'

Prince Faisal bin Fahd Stadium, Riyadh

11 January 2008
16:35

Bahrain	3–1	Kuwait
Al-Dakeel 29'; Ali 85'; Abbas 89'		Al Hadhoud 67'

Prince Faisal bin Fahd Stadium, Riyadh
13 January 2008
16:35

Oman	0–4	Qatar
		Ismail 2'; Lutfi 76'; Al Allaq 88', 90'

Prince Faisal bin Fahd Stadium, Riyadh

13 January 2008
19:45

Kuwait	0–3	Saudi Arabia
		Al-Qarni 26'; Al-Salem 81', 89'

Prince Faisal bin Fahd Stadium, Riyadh
15 January 2008
16:35

Qatar	1–1	Bahrain
Al Allaq 86'		Abbas 8' (pen.)

Prince Faisal bin Fahd Stadium, Riyadh

16 January 2008
16:35

Oman	3–0	Kuwait
Al Ghailani 31'; Al-Mukhaini 49'; Mubarak 83'

Prince Faisal bin Fahd Stadium, Riyadh
17 January 2008
19:45

Saudi Arabia	1–0	Bahrain
Al-Bishi 50' (pen.)	Report

Prince Faisal bin Fahd Stadium, Riyadh

== Statistics ==
=== Goalscorers ===
There have been 28 goals scored in 10 matches, for an average of 2.8 goals per match.

3 goals

- (Qatar) Mousa Al Allaq
- (Qatar) Hamid Ismail
- (Saudi Arabia) Yousef Al-Salem

2 goals

- (Bahrain) Mahmoud Abbas
- (Bahrain) Abdulla Al-Dakeel

1 goal

- (Bahrain) Sayed Ali
- (Bahrain) Masoud Gambar
- (Kuwait) Abdulrahman Al-Awadi
- (Kuwait) Mohammed Al Hadhoud
- (Kuwait) Marzouq Zaki
- (Oman) Mohammed Al-Balushi
- (Oman) Khaled Al Ghailani
- (Oman) Abdullah Al-Mukhaini
- (Oman) Younis Mubarak
- (Qatar) Mohammed Al Yazeedi
- (Qatar) Ahmed Lutfi
- (Saudi Arabia) Jufain Al-Bishi
- (Saudi Arabia) Abdullaziz Al-Dawsari
- (Saudi Arabia) Abdulaziz Al-Kalthem
- (Saudi Arabia) Mohsen Al-Qarni

=== Awards ===
Player of the Tournament

- (Qatar) Hamid Ismail

Golden Boot

- (Qatar) Hamid Ismail

Golden Glove

- (Saudi Arabia) Waleed Abdullah

== See also ==
- Arabian Gulf Cup
- Arab Gulf Cup Football Federation
