= 2009–10 Saudi Pro League =

Saudi Pro League
- Season: 2009–10
- Dates: 18 August 2009 – 18 March 2010
- Champions: Al-Hilal (12th title)
- Champions League: Al-Hilal; Al-Ittihad; Al-Nassr; Al-Shabab
- Matches: 132
- Goals: 377 (2.86 per match)
- Top goalscorer: Mohammad Al-Shalhoub (12 goals)
- Biggest home win: Al-Ittihad 7–1 Al-Qadsiah (26 August 2009)
- Biggest away win: Najran 0–5 Al-Wehda (7 January 2010)
- Highest scoring: Al-Ittihad 7–1 Al-Qadsiah (26 August 2009)
- Longest winning run: 6 games Al-Hilal
- Longest unbeaten run: 14 games Al-Hilal
- Longest winless run: 14 games Al-Raed
- Longest losing run: 8 games Najran

The 2009–10 Saudi Professional League (known as the Zain Professional League for sponsorship reasons) was the 34th season of the Saudi Pro League, the top Saudi professional league for association football clubs, since its establishment in 1976. The season began on 18 August 2009, and ended on 18 March 2010. Al-Ittihad were the defending champions.

Al-Hilal secured the title with a 2–0 win away to Al-Hazem on 24 January 2010. Al-Hilal won the league with three games to spare. Al-Hilal, Al-Ittihad, Al-Shabab and Al-Nassr all secured a berth for the 2011 AFC Champions League. No teams were relegated at the end of the season following the decision to increase the number of teams from 12 to 14.

== Name sponsorship ==
On 16 June 2009, the Saudi Professional League announced sponsorship agreement with telecommunication company Zain. As part of the sponsorship deal, the Saudi Professional League would be known as the Zain Professional League for the next 4 seasons.

== Qualification and Prize Money ==
The League champions, runners-up and third-placed team, as well as the winners of the King Cup of Champions, qualify for the 2011 AFC Champions League.

The top six teams, and the Crown Prince Cup winners and runners-up qualify for King Cup of Champions.

- Prize money:
  - First place: 2.5 million Saudi Riyals
  - Second place: 1.5 million Saudi Riyals
  - Third place: 1 million Saudi Riyals

== Teams ==
Twelve teams competed in the league – the top nine teams from the previous season, the relegation play-off winner and the two teams promoted from the Saudi First Division. Al-Raed defeated Abha 4–3 on aggregate to confirm their top-flight status. The promoted teams were Al-Qadsiah (returning after a season's absence) and Al-Fateh (playing top-flight football for the first time ever). They replaced Abha (relegated after a season's presence) and Al-Watani (ending their two-year top-flight spell).

=== Stadiums and locations ===
Locations of teams in the 2009–10 Saudi Professional League

Club	Location	Stadium	Capacity
Al-Ahli	Jeddah	Prince Abdullah Al-Faisal Sports City	24,000
Al-Ettifaq	Dammam	Prince Mohamed bin Fahd Stadium	30,000
Al-Fateh	Hofuf	Prince Abdullah bin Jalawi Stadium	20,000
Al-Hazem	Ar Rass	Al-Hazem Club Stadium	11,000
Al-Hilal	Riyadh	King Fahd Sports City	69,000
Al-Ittihad	Jeddah	Prince Abdullah Al-Faisal Sports City	24,000
Al-Nassr	Riyadh	King Fahd Sports City	69,000
Al-Qadsiah	Khobar	Prince Saud bin Jalawi Stadium	10,000
Al-Raed	Buraidah	King Abdullah Sports City	35,000
Al-Shabab	Riyadh	King Fahd Sports City	69,000
Al-Wehda	Mecca	King Abdulaziz Sports City	28,550
Najran	Najran	Prince Hathloul bin Abdulaziz Sports City	10,000

=== Personnel ===
Club	Head coach	2008–09 season	Notes
Al-Ahli	(Brazil) Sérgio Farias	3rd	Qualified to the 2010 AFC Champions League
Al-Ettifaq	(Romania) Marin Ion	6th	Qualified to the 2009–10 Gulf Club Champions Cup
Al-Fateh	(Tunisia) Fathi Al-Jabal	First Division runners-up	
Al-Hazem	(Brazil) Lula Pereira	8th	
Al-Hilal	(Belgium) Eric Gerets	2nd	Qualified to the 2010 AFC Champions League
Al-Ittihad	(Argentina) Enzo Trossero	**1st**	Qualified to the 2010 AFC Champions League
Al-Nassr	(Uruguay) Jorge da Silva	5th	Qualified to the 2009–10 Gulf Club Champions Cup
Al-Qadsiah	(Bulgaria) Dimitar Dimitrov	First Division champions	
Al-Raed	(Brazil) Edison	10th	
Al-Shabab	(Brazil) Edgar	4th	Qualified to the 2009–10 Gulf Club Champions Cup
Al-Wehda	(Portugal) Eurico Gomes	7th	
Najran	(Tunisia) Mourad Okbi	9th	

=== Managerial changes ===
Team	Outgoing manager	Manner of departure	Replaced by	Date
Al-Hilal	(Belgium) Georges Leekens	Sacked	(Belgium) Eric Gerets	May 2009
Al-Ahli	(Bulgaria) Stoycho Mladenov	Sacked	(Argentina) Gustavo Alfaro	June 2009
Al-Raed	(Brazil) Luiz Antônio Zaluar	End of contract	(Portugal) Acácio Casimiro	June 2009
Al-Hazem	(Tunisia) Ammar Souayah	End of contract	(Egypt) Mohsen Saleh	July 2009
Al-Nassr	(Argentina) Edgardo Bauza	End of contract	(Uruguay) Jorge da Silva	July 2009
Al-Shabab	(Argentina) Enzo Trossero	End of contract	(Portugal) Jaime Pacheco	July 2009
Al-Qadsiah	(Argentina) Daniel Lanata	Sacked	(Tunisia) Ammar Souayah	September 2009
Al-Raed	(Portugal) Acácio Casimiro	Sacked	(Brazil) Edison	October 2009
Najran	(Argentina) Marcelo Zuleta	Sacked	(Tunisia) Samir Jouili	October 2009
Al-Ettifaq	(Bulgaria) Stoycho Mladenov	Sacked	(Egypt) Saber Eid (caretaker)	October 2009
Al-Ettifaq	(Egypt) Saber Eid (caretaker)	End of caretaker period	(Romania) Marin Ion	October 2009
Al-Ahli	(Argentina) Gustavo Alfaro	Resigned	(France) Alan Guido (caretaker)	November 2009
Al-Qadsiah	(Tunisia) Ammar Souayah	Resigned	(Tunisia) Anas Al Zerqati (caretaker)	November 2009
Al-Hazem	(Egypt) Mohsen Saleh	Resigned	(Tunisia) Emad Al Solami (caretaker)	November 2009
Al-Hazem	(Tunisia) Emad Al Solami (caretaker)	End of caretaker period	(Brazil) Lula Pereira	December 2009
Al-Ahli	(France) Alan Guido (caretaker)	End of caretaker period	(Brazil) Sérgio Farias	December 2009
Al-Qadsiah	(Tunisia) Anas Al Zerqati (caretaker)	End of caretaker period	(Bulgaria) Dimitar Dimitrov	December 2009
Najran	(Tunisia) Samir Jouili	Sacked	(Tunisia) Mourad Okbi	January 2010
Al-Ittihad	(Argentina) Gabriel Calderón	Sacked	(Saudi Arabia) Hassan Khalifah (caretaker)	January 2010
Al-Ittihad	(Saudi Arabia) Hassan Khalifah (caretaker)	End of caretaker period	(Argentina) Enzo Trossero	January 2010
Al-Shabab	(Portugal) Jaime Pacheco	Sacked	(Brazil) Edgar	April 2010

=== Foreign players ===
The number of foreign players is restricted to four per team, including a slot for a player from AFC countries.

- Players name in **bold** indicates the player was registered during the mid-season transfer window.
- Players name in italic indicates the player was de-registered or left their respective clubs during the mid-season transfer window.

Club	Player 1	Player 2	Player 3	AFC Player	Former players
Al-Ahli	(Brazil) **Marcinho**	(Brazil) **Victor Simões**	(Tunisia) **Saïf Ghezal**	(Oman) Ahmed Kano	(Argentina) Javier Toledo (Argentina) Sebastián Rusculleda (Colombia) Josimar Mosquera
Al-Ettifaq	(Romania) **Cristian Dănălache**	(Romania) **Dorel Stoica**	(United States) **Jeremiah White**	(Oman) **Badar Al-Maimani**	(Morocco) Youness Mankari (Oman) Khalifa Ayil Al-Noufali (Panama) José Luis Garcés
Al-Fateh	(Nigeria) Emmanuel Emmanuel	(Tunisia) Naïm Berrabet	(Tunisia) Ramzi Ben Younès		
Al-Hazem	(Morocco) Salaheddine Aqqal	(Senegal) Hamad Ji	(Senegal) Mohamed Rebeiz	(Jordan) Bashar Bani Yaseen	
Al-Hilal	(Brazil) Thiago Neves	(Romania) Mirel Rădoi	(Sweden) Christian Wilhelmsson	(South Korea) Lee Young-pyo	
Al-Ittihad	(Algeria) **Abdelmalek Ziaya**	(Morocco) Hicham Aboucherouane	(Tunisia) Amine Chermiti	(Oman) Ahmed Hadid Al-Mukhaini	(Argentina) Luciano Leguizamón
Al-Nassr	(Argentina) Víctor Figueroa	(Egypt) Hossam Ghaly	(Guinea) **Pascal Feindouno**	(South Korea) Lee Chun-soo	(Brazil) Éder Gaúcho
Al-Qadsiah	(Nigeria) **Nasigba John-Jumbo**	(Paraguay) Nelson Figueredo	(Peru) Juan Cominges		(Argentina) Rubén Gigena (Oman) Said Suwailim Al-Shoon
Al-Raed	(Brazil) **Bruno Luiz**	(Brazil) Felipe Campos	(Brazil) **Sérgio Ricardo**	(Jordan) Hatem Aqel	(Brazil) Mário Sérgio (Mali) Sédonoudé Abouta
Al-Shabab	(Angola) Flávio Amado	(Brazil) Marcelo Camacho	(Libya) Tarik El Taib	(Bahrain) **Hussain Ali Baba**	(Australia) Adam Griffiths
Al-Wehda	(Morocco) **Abdelkarim Benhania**	(Morocco) Abdessamad Rafik	(Morocco) Youssef Kaddioui		(Brazil) Eli Felton
Najran	(Democratic Republic of the Congo) **Yves Diba Ilunga**	(Morocco) **Abdessamad Ouarrad**	(Nigeria) Moussa Soulaimane	(Jordan) Anas Bani Yaseen	(France) Cédric Kisamba (Guinea) Ibrahim Kamara

== League table ==
Pos	Team	Pld	W	D	L	GF	GA	GD	Pts	Qualification or relegation
1	Al-Hilal (C)	22	18	2	2	56	18	+38	56	Qualification for the Champions League group stage and the King Cup of Champions (Note: Since the winners of the King Cup of Champions, Al-Ittihad, qualified for the Champions League, the spot given to the King Cup of Champions winners (Champions League group stage) was passed to the fourth-placed team.)
2	Al-Ittihad	22	14	3	5	46	30	+16	45	Qualification for the Champions League group stage and the King Cup of Champions
3	Al-Nassr	22	12	7	3	38	23	+15	43	Qualification for the Champions League group stage and the King Cup of Champions
4	Al-Shabab	22	11	7	4	36	23	+13	40	Qualification for the Champions League group stage and the King Cup of Champions
5	Al-Wehda	22	7	7	8	34	27	+7	28	Qualification for the King Cup of Champions
6	Al-Ahli	22	7	7	8	28	29	−1	28	Qualification for the King Cup of Champions
7	Al-Hazem	22	6	6	10	29	38	−9	24	Qualification for the King Cup of Champions
8	Al-Fateh	22	6	6	10	26	38	−12	24	Qualification for the King Cup of Champions
9	Al-Ettifaq	22	5	7	10	24	30	−6	22	
10	Al-Qadsiah	22	5	5	12	20	40	−20	20	
11	Al-Raed	22	3	7	12	18	35	−17	16	
12	Najran	22	4	4	14	22	46	−24	16	

Source: SLstat
Rules for classification: 1) Points; 2) Total goal difference; 3) Total goals scored; 4) Head-to-head points; 5) Head-to-head goal difference; 6) Play-off (only for deciding champion, relegation and AFC competitions participation).
(C) Champions

== Results ==
Home \ Away	AHL	ETT	FAT	HAZ	HIL	ITT	NSR	QAD	RAE	SHB	WHD	NAJ
Al-Ahli		2–0	1–1	2–1	1–2	0–1	3–3	3–2	1–0	1–1	2–0	0–1
Al-Ettifaq	0–0		0–2	2–3	0–2	2–1	1–1	0–2	3–0	0–0	1–3	3–1
Al-Fateh	3–1	0–3		1–1	0–4	1–2	0–2	5–0	2–0	2–1	0–0	0–1
Al-Hazem	1–1	0–2	2–1		0–2	1–2	2–2	1–1	2–1	1–2	1–2	3–1
Al-Hilal	3–1	1–0	5–1	4–0		5–0	2–2	2–1	2–1	2–2	3–1	5–0
Al-Ittihad	2–1	1–1	1–1	5–2	2–1		1–2	7–1	3–2	1–2	2–0	3–1
Al-Nassr	1–1	1–0	3–1	1–0	2–1	0–1		3–0	4–2	0–2	1–0	3–2
Al-Qadsiah	1–2	1–1	0–1	3–1	1–2	3–3	0–2		0–0	0–3	1–0	1–0
Al-Raed	1–2	0–0	2–1	1–1	0–2	0–2	0–0	2–0		1–1	1–1	2–2
Al-Shabab	2–1	4–1	2–2	0–2	1–2	1–0	3–2	0–1	2–1		2–2	1–0
Al-Wehda	1–1	2–2	6–0	0–0	1–2	1–3	0–2	2–1	4–1	1–1		2–0
Najran	2–1	3–2	1–1	2–4	1–2	2–3	1–1	0–0	0–1	1–3	0–5	

Updated to match(es) played on 18 March 2010. Source: Slstat.com
Legend: Blue = home team win; Yellow = draw; Red = away team win.

== Season statistics ==
=== Scoring ===
==== Top scorers ====
Rank	Scorer	Club	Goals
1	(Saudi Arabia) Mohammad Al-Shalhoub	Al-Hilal	12
2	(Brazil) Thiago Neves	Al-Hilal	11
2	(Saudi Arabia) Mohammad Al-Sahlawi	Al-Nassr	11
4	(Saudi Arabia) Waleed Al-Gizani	Al-Hazem	10
5	(Argentina) Víctor Figueroa	Al-Nassr	9
5	(Saudi Arabia) Ahmed Abo Obaid	Al-Fateh	9
5	(Saudi Arabia) Muhannad Assiri	Al-Wehda	9
5	(Saudi Arabia) Nasser Al-Shamrani	Al-Shabab	9
5	(Saudi Arabia) Yasser Al-Qahtani	Al-Hilal	9
5	(Sweden) Christian Wilhelmsson	Al-Hilal	9

==== Hat-tricks ====
Player	For	Against	Result	Date	Ref
(Angola) Flávio Amado	Al-Shabab	Najran	3–1 (A)	19 August 2009	
(Saudi Arabia) Naif Hazazi	Al-Ittihad	Al-Qadsiah	7–1 (H)	26 August 2009	
(Brazil) Thiago Neves	Al-Hilal	Al-Ittihad	5–0 (H)	10 December 2009	
(Morocco) Hicham Aboucherouane	Al-Ittihad	Al-Hazem	5–2 (H)	6 January 2010	
(Saudi Arabia) Muhannad Assiri	Al-Wehda	Najran	5–0 (A)	7 January 2010	
(Morocco) Abdelkarim Benhenia^{4}	Al-Wehda	Al-Fateh	6–0 (H)	28 January 2010	

Notes

^{4} Player scored 4 goals
(H) – Home team
(A) – Away team

=== Clean sheets ===
Rank	Player	Club	Clean sheets
1	(Saudi Arabia) Khalid Radhy	Al Nassr	8
2	(Saudi Arabia) Mohamed Al-Deayea	Al Hilal	7
3	(Saudi Arabia) Mohammad Khouja	Al-Ettifaq	5
3	(Saudi Arabia) Mohammad Sharifi	Al-Fateh	5
3	(Saudi Arabia) Mohammed Al-Khojali	Al-Raed	5
3	(Saudi Arabia) Waleed Abdullah	Al-Shabab	5
7	(Saudi Arabia) Faisal Al-Merqeb	Al-Wehda	4
8	(Saudi Arabia) Jaber Al-Ameri	Najran	3
8	(Saudi Arabia) Mabrouk Zaid	Al-Ittihad	3

=== Discipline ===
==== Player ====
- Most yellow cards: 8
  - (Tunisia) Ramzi Ben Younès (Al-Fateh)
- Most red cards: 2
  - (Saudi Arabia) Abdullah Al-Garni (Al-Nassr)
  - (Saudi Arabia) Ahmed Menawer (Al-Hazem)
  - (Saudi Arabia) Mansoor Al-Harbi (Al-Ahli)
  - (Saudi Arabia) Zakaria Al-Hadaf (Al-Qadsiah)

==== Club ====
- Most yellow cards: 56
  - Al-Hazem
- Most red cards: 8
  - Al-Ittihad

== Awards ==
=== Arriyadiyah and Mobily Awards for Sports Excellence ===
The Arriyadiyah and Mobily Awards for Sports Excellence were awarded at the conclusion of the season for the fourth time since its inception in 2007. The awards were sponsored by Saudi newspaper Arriyadiyah and Saudi telecommunication company Mobily. The awards were presented on 13 May 2010.

Award	Winner	Club
Player of the Season	(gold) (Sweden) Christian Wilhelmsson; (silver) (Saudi Arabia) Osama Hawsawi; (bronze) (Saudi Arabia) Mohammad Al-Sahlawi	Al-Hilal; Al-Hilal; Al-Nassr
Young Player of the Season	(gold) (Saudi Arabia) Ibrahim Ghaleb; (silver) (Saudi Arabia) Nawaf Al-Abed; (bronze) (Saudi Arabia) Khaled Al-Mutairi	Al-Nassr; Al-Hilal; Al-Hazem
Golden Boot	(Saudi Arabia) Mohammad Al-Shalhoub	Al-Hilal

=== Al-Riyadiya Awards ===
Another set of awards was awarded at the end of the season. It was announced that AlRiyadiya were presenting their awards for the first time. The awards were known as AlRiyadiya Awards and were presented on 8 May 2010.

- Best Goalkeeper: (Saudi Arabia) Waleed Abdullah (Al-Shabab)
- Best defender: (Saudi Arabia) Osama Hawsawi (Al-Hilal)
- Best Midfielder: (Sweden) Christian Wilhelmsson (Al-Hilal)
- Best attacker: (Saudi Arabia) Mohammad Al-Sahlawi (Al-Nassr)
- Player of the Year: (Saudi Arabia) Osama Hawsawi (Al-Hilal)

== See also ==
- 2010 King Cup of Champions
- 2009–10 Crown Prince Cup (Final)
- 2011 AFC Champions League
