= Khamees =

Khamees is a surname. Notable people with the surname include:

- Adnan Khamees Al-Talyani (born 1964), retired footballer from the United Arab Emirates
- Bader Al-Khamees (born 1984), Saudi Arabian football player
- Fahad Khamees (born 1962), Emirati footballer
- Mahmoud Khamees (born 1987), Emirati footballer
- Mohammad Khamees (born 1981), Jordanian footballer
- Nasir Khamees (born 1965), Emirati footballer
- Yousef Khamees (footballer, born 1961), Saudi football forward
- Yousef Khamees (footballer, born 1990), Saudi Arabian footballer
- Khamees Saad Mubarak, UAE football forward
