= Drissa (given name) =

Drissa is both a given name and a surname. Notable people with the name include:

- Drissa Camara (born 2002), Ivorian footballer
- Drissa Diakité (born 198), Malian footballer
- Drissa Diallo (born 1973), Guinean footballer
- Drissa Diarra (footballer, born 1985), Malian footballer
- Drissa Diarra (footballer, born 1999), Malian footballer
- Drissa Diarrassouba (born 1994), Ivorian footballer
- Drissa Kone (born 1960), Malian drummer
- Drissa Sangaré (born 1987), Malian footballer
- Drissa Tou (born 1973), Burkinabé boxer
- Drissa Traoré (born 1992), Ivorian footballer
- Drissa Traouré (born 1968), Ivorian sprint canoer
- Bamba Drissa (born 1990), Ivorian footballer
