= Mohammed Al-Rashid =

Saudi Arabian footballer

Personal information
- Full name: Mohammed Ali Al-Rashid
- Date of birth: 14 June 1980 (age 46)
- Place of birth: Dammam, Saudi Arabia
- Height: 1.82 m (6 ft 0 in)
- Position: Striker

Senior career*
Years	Team	Apps	(Gls)
1999–2002	Al-Ettifaq		
2002–2013	Al-Taawoun		
2011–2012	→ Al-Ittihad (loan)	21	(10)
2013–2014	Al-Ettifaq	8	(1)
2014–2015	Hajer	26	(8)
2015–2016	Al-Khaleej	5	(0)
2016	Al-Tai	6	(0)
2016–2017	Al-Sahel FC		
- * Club domestic league appearances and goals as of 25 December 2011

Mohammed Al-Rashid (Arabic: محمد الراشد; born June 14, 1980) is a Saudi Arabian footballer, playing for Al-Sahel FC. He plays as centre forward, He played for Al-Ettifaq, moved to Al-Ittihad in loan on 2010-11. He signed a contract for 10 million SR. In his First season with Al-Ittihad he scored 14 goals.
