= Samir Jouili =

Tunisian football manager

Personal information
- Date of birth: 15 August 1963 (age 63)
- Place of birth: Tunisia

Managerial career
- Years: Team
- 2005–2006: US Monastir (assistant)
- 2006–2007: US Monastir
- 2008: EGS Gafsa
- 2008–2009: Khor Fakkan Club
- 2009: US Monastir
- 2009–2010: Najran SC
- 2011: ES Hammam-Sousse
- 2013–2014: AS Djerba
- 2014: Olympique Béja
- 2015: US Monastir
- 2015–2016: EO Sidi Bouzid
- 2016: US Ben Guerdane
- 2017: US Tataouine
- 2018–?: Al-Ansar FC
- 2022–2023: NC Magra

Samir Jouili is a Tunisian football manager.
