= Yousef Rashid =

Saudi Arabian footballer

Personal information
- Full name: Yousef Rashid Al-Muwallad
- Date of birth: June 8, 1978 (age 48)
- Place of birth: Saudi Arabia
- Position: Right-back

Youth career
- Al-Ansar

Senior career*
Years	Team	Apps	(Gls)
2000–2006	Al-Ansar		
2006–2009	Al-Hazm		
2009	→ Al-Qadisiyah (loan)		
2009–2010	Al-Ta'ee		
2010–2011	Al-Taawon		
2011–2012	Al-Ta'ee		
2012–2013	Al-Nahda		
2013–2015	Ohod		
2015–2016	Al-Ansar		
- * Club domestic league appearances and goals

Yousef Rashid (Arabic: يوسف رشيد; born June 8, 1978) is a Saudi football player who plays a right-back for Al-Ansar.
