= Bandar Al-Enezi =

Saudi Arabian footballer

Personal information
- Full name: Bandar Auddah Al-Enezi
- Date of birth: August 11, 1987 (age 39)
- Place of birth: Saudi Arabia
- Height: 1.79 m (5 ft 10 1/2 in)
- Position: Midfielder

Team information
- Current team: Al-Fadhl

Youth career
- Al Hajer

Senior career*
Years	Team	Apps	(Gls)
2004–2008	Al Hajer	?	(2)
2008–2011	Al-Hilal	0	(0)
2011–2014	Al Hajer	0	(0)
2014-2018	Al-Nojoom		
2020	Al-Omran		
2021-2022	Al-Taraf		
2022–2025	Al-Nojoom		
2025–	Al-Fadhl		
- * Club domestic league appearances and goals

Bandar Awdah Al-Enezi (Arabic: بندر العنزي) (born 11 August 1987) is a Saudi footballer who plays for Al-Fadhl as a midfielder. Having played for Al Hajer from 2004 to 2008, he moved to Al-Hilal in 2008, but returned to Al Hajer in January 2011.
