= Ala Rishani =

Saudi Arabian footballer

Personal information
- Full name: Ala Rishani
- Date of birth: October 30, 1987 (age 38)
- Place of birth: Jeddah, Saudi Arabia
- Height: 1.79 m (5 ft 10 1/2 in)
- Position: Midfielder

Youth career
- 2005–2008: Al-Ahli

Senior career*
Years	Team	Apps	(Gls)
2008–2012	Al-Ahli	33	(2)
2011	Al-Ettifaq(Loan)	11	(1)
2012–2013	Al-Taawon FC		
2013–2015	Al Faisaly		
2015–2017	Al-Khaleej		

International career
2010–	Saudi Arabia		
- * Club domestic league appearances and goals

Ala Rishani (Arabic: علاء ريشاني; born 30 October 1987) is a Saudi football player.

== Honours ==
=== Al-Ahli (Jeddah) ===
- Saudi Federation cup: 2007
- Gulf Club Champions Cup: 2008
- Saudi Champions Cup: 2011
