= Jean-Christian Lang =

French footballer and manager (born 1950)

Personal information
- Place of birth: Roubaix, France
- Position: Midfielder

Senior career*
Years	Team	Apps	(Gls)
1968–1972	Sochaux	3	(0)
1972–1974	Louhans-Cuiseaux	28	(1)
1974–1980	Châteauroux	175	(15)
1980–1981	Thonon	25	(3)

International career
	France Amateurs	30	(?)

Managerial career
- 1981–1987: Annecy
- 1987–1989: Le Puy
- 1989–1990: Montceau
- 1990–1992: Dôle-Tavaux
- 1993–1999: Sochaux (assistant)
- 2001–2005: Servette
- 2006–2008: Difaa El Jadida
- 2008: Maghreb Fez
- 2008–2009: JS Kabylie
- 2010–2011: Al Wehda
- 2011–: Lekhwiya (assistant)
- 2014–2014: ES Setif
- * Club domestic league appearances and goals

Jean-Christian Lang (born 22 August 1950) is a French football manager and former player.

Lang was born in Roubaix. He began his playing career with Sochaux, playing three Ligue 1 matches, before leaving to play in Ligue 2 with Louhans-Cuiseaux, Châteauroux, Thonon and Annecy.

Lang was a player-manager with Annecy, and went on to manage Le Puy and Montceau in Ligue 2, before moving to Swiss club Servette. He has also managed clubs in North Africa, including Difaa El Jadida and Maghreb Fez in Morocco, as well as JS Kabylie in Algeria.

Lang has Polish ancestry, and became a naturalised French citizen in 1964. He speaks fluent Polish, French and English.
