= Awidhah Al-Aamri =

Saudi Arabian footballer

Personal information
- Full name: Awidhah Ali Al-Aamri
- Date of birth: 15 March 1983 (age 43)
- Place of birth: Saudi Arabia
- Height: 1.93 m (6 ft 4 in)
- Position: Goalkeeper

Senior career*
Years	Team	Apps	(Gls)
2005–2008	Al-Ahli		
2008–2013	Al-Faisaly		
2013–2016	Al-Riyadh		
2016–2017	Al-Diriyah		
2017–2018	Najd		
2018–2020	Afif		
- * Club domestic league appearances and goals

Awidhah Al-Aamri (Arabic: عويضه العامري; born 15 March 1983) is a Saudi football player who plays as a goalkeeper.
