= Bruno Luiz =

Brazilian footballer (born 1984)

Personal information
- Full name: Bruno Luiz de Almeida Rodrigues
- Date of birth: September 9, 1984 (age 42)
- Place of birth: Rio de Janeiro, Brazil
- Height: 1.82 m (5 ft 11 1/2 in)
- Position: Forward

Team information
- Current team: Bangu

Senior career*
Years	Team	Apps	(Gls)
2004–2007	Juventude	1	(1)
2007–2008	Duque de Caxias		
2008	Resende		
2008	Volta Redonda		
2008–2009	Bangu	14	(8)
2009–2010	Macaé	6	(3)
2010	Al-Raed	2	(1)
2011	Macaé		
2012	Americano-RJ		
2012	Madureira	14	(2)
2016–	Bangu		
- * Club domestic league appearances and goals as of 8 January 2010

Bruno Luiz de Almeida Rodrigues (born September 9, 1984), known as just Bruno Luiz, is a Brazilian football forward. He most recently played in the Madureira.

Bruno Luiz previously played for Juventude in the Campeonato Brasileiro and also played for Al-Raed in the Saudi Premier League.
