= Turki Al-Khodair =

Saudi Arabian footballer

Personal information
- Full name: Turki Ahmed Al-Khodair
- Date of birth: August 23, 1987 (age 39)
- Place of birth: Madinah, Saudi Arabia
- Height: 1.78 m (5 ft 10 in)
- Position: Midfielder

Youth career
- Al-Ansar

Senior career*
Years	Team	Apps	(Gls)
2007–2013	Al-Ansar		
2013–2018	Al-Ittihad	4	(0)
2015	→ Al-Khaleej (loan)	2	(0)
2019	Al-Qaisumah	8	(0)
2019–2020	Jeddah	19	(3)
2020–2021	Ohod	34	(0)
2021–2022	Al-Bukiryah		
2022–2023	Al-Ula		
2024–2025	Al-Aqeeq		

International career^{‡}
2012	Saudi Arabia	2	(0)
- * Club domestic league appearances and goals as of 31 May 2021 (UTC) ‡ National team caps and goals as of 22 January 2017 (UTC)

Turki Al-Khodair (Arabic: تركي الخضير; born 23 August 1987) is a Saudi Arabian footballer who plays as a midfielder.

== Honours ==
Al Ittihad

- Crown Prince Cup (1): 2016–17
- King Cup of Champions: 2017–18
