= Abdullah Al-Mukhaini =

Omani footballer (born 1986)

Personal information
- Full name: Abdullah Thuwaini Al-Mukhaini
- Date of birth: 6 November 1986 (age 40)
- Place of birth: Sur, Oman
- Position: Striker

Team information
- Current team: Al-Shabab

Youth career
- 2002–2005: Sur

Senior career*
Years	Team	Apps	(Gls)
2005–2010	Sur	?	(4)
2010–2013	Al-Oruba	?	(14)
2013–2014	Al-Suwaiq	?	(5)
2014–	Al-Shabab		

International career
2007–2012	Oman	2	(0)
- * Club domestic league appearances and goals

Abdullah Thuwaini Al-Mukhaini (Arabic: عبد الله ثويني المخيني; born 6 November 1986), commonly known as Abdullah Al-Mukhaini, is an Omani footballer who plays for Al-Shabab Club in Oman Professional League.

== Club career ==
On 7 July 2014, he signed a one-year contract with Al-Shabab Club.

=== Club career statistics ===
Club	Season	Division	League		Cup		Continental (Note: Includes appearances in the AFC Champions League and AFC Cup)		Other		Total	
Club	Season	Division	Apps	Goals	Apps	Goals	Apps	Goals	Apps	Goals	Apps	Goals
Sur	2006–07	Omani League	-	1	-	1	0	0	-	0	-	2
Sur	2007–08	Omani League	-	1	-	1	0	0	-	0	-	2
Sur	2008–09	Omani League	-	2	-	0	0	0	-	1	-	3
Sur	Total		-	4	-	2	0	0	-	1	-	7
Al-Oruba	2010–11	Oman Elite League	-	8	-	2	5	0	-	0	-	10
Al-Oruba	2011–12	Oman Elite League	-	3	-	0	2	2	-	0	-	3
Al-Oruba	2012–13	Oman Elite League	-	3	-	1	0	0	-	0	-	6
Al-Oruba	Total		-	14	-	3	7	2	-	0	-	19
Al-Suwaiq	2013–14	Oman Professional League	-	5	-	0	4	0	-	0	-	5
Al-Suwaiq	Total		-	5	-	0	4	0	-	0	-	5
Career total			-	23	-	5	11	2	-	1	-	31

== International career ==
Abdullah was selected for the national team for the first time in 2011. He earned his first call-up for Oman on 15 November 2011 against Saudi Arabia in the Third Round of 2014 FIFA World Cup qualification.

== Honours ==
=== Club ===
With Sur
- Sultan Qaboos Cup (1): 2007; Runners-up 2006
- Omani Federation Cup (0): Runners-up 2007
- Oman Super Cup (0): Runners-up 2008

With Al-Oruba
- Omani League (0): Runners-up 2010–11
- Sultan Qaboos Cup (1): 2010
- Oman Super Cup (1): 2011
