= Fahad Al-Saqri =

Saudi Arabian footballer

Personal information
- Full name: Fahad Khaled Al-Saqri
- Date of birth: 11 October 1989 (age 37)
- Place of birth: Saudi Arabia
- Height: 1.71 m (5 ft 7 in)
- Position: Winger

Youth career
- –2011: Al-Tai

Senior career*
Years	Team	Apps	(Gls)
2011–2015	Al-Tai		
2015–2017	Al-Faisaly	40	(6)
2017–2018	Al-Tai	27	(1)
2018–2019	Al-Arabi		
2019–2020	Al-Shoulla		
2021	Al-Lewaa		
- * Club domestic league appearances and goals

Fahad Al-Saqri (born 11 October 1989) is a Saudi footballer who plays as a winger.
