= Mohammed Al Hadhoud =

Kuwaiti footballer

Personal information
- Full name: Mohammed Jassim Mohammed Al Hadhoud
- Date of birth: January 1, 1985 (age 41)
- Place of birth: Kuwait City, Kuwait
- Position: Midfielder

Senior career*
Years	Team	Apps	(Gls)
2001–2017	Kazma		
2010	→ Al Salmiya (loan)		
2010–2011	→ Al Naser (loan)		

International career
	Kuwait	1	(0)
- * Club domestic league appearances and goals

Mohammed Al Hadhoud (Arabic: محمد الهدهود, born 1 January 1985) is a Kuwaiti footballer. He currently plays as a midfielder for the Kuwaiti Premier League club Kazma.
