= Yousef Al-Salem =

Saudi Arabian footballer (1985–2023)

Personal information
- Full name: Yousef Mansour Al-Salem
- Date of birth: 4 May 1985
- Place of birth: Dammam, Saudi Arabia
- Date of death: 12 February 2023 (aged 37)
- Height: 1.79 m (5 ft 10 in)
- Position: Striker

Youth career
- 2002–2004: Al-Qadsiah

Senior career*
Years	Team	Apps	(Gls)
2004–2008	Al-Qadsiah	59	(21)
2008–2009	Al-Shabab	13	(2)
2009–2013	Al-Ettifaq	94	(39)
2013–2016	Al-Hilal	37	(4)
2016–2018	Al-Ettifaq	19	(3)
2020	Al-Jubail	5	(2)
2020–2021	Al-Thoqbah	23	(2)
2021–2023	Al-Jubail	19	(10)
Total		269	(83)

International career
2006–2008	Saudi Arabia U-23	18	(8)
2007–2013	Saudi Arabia	11	(3)
- * Club domestic league appearances and goals

Yousef Al-Salem (Arabic: يوسف السالم, 4 May 1985 – 12 February 2023) was a Saudi Arabian professional footballer who played as a striker for several clubs most notably Al-Ettifaq and Al-Hilal. He was a member of the Saudi Arabia national team from 2007 to 2013.

== Career ==
Al-Salem began his career at Al-Qadsiah and made his debut during the 2004–05 season. Following the club's relegation to the First Division in 2008, Al-Salem joined Al-Shabab. In his single season with the club, Al-Salem won the King Cup and Prince Faisal bin Fahd Cup. In July 2009, Al-Salem joined Al-Ettifaq on a four-year contract. He scored 52 goals in 132 appearances in his four seasons at the club. Following the expiry, Al-Salem joined Al-Hilal on a free transfer. Despite not establishing himself as a starter for the club, Al-Salem went on to make 66 appearances and scored 10 goals with the club. He also won three titles with Al-Hilal. In September 2016, Al-Salem returned to Al-Ettifaq following his release by Al-Hilal. In March 2020, after almost two years without a club, Al-Salem joined Saudi Second Division side Al-Jubail on a six-month contract. In October 2020, Al-Salem joined Al-Thoqbah.

Al-Salem was a full international, who earned caps at all youth levels. He helped the under-23 side win the 2008 GCC U-23 Championship. He made his senior debut in 2007 and scored three goals for the senior side.

== Death ==
Al-Salem died on 12 February 2023, at the age of 37. The cause of death has not been specified, other than reports that he suffered an illness about three weeks before he died.

== Career statistics ==
=== Club ===
As of match played 12 February 2023

Appearances and goals by club, season and competition
Club	Season	League			National cup (Note: Includes King Cup)		League cup (Note: Includes Crown Prince Cup)		Continental (Note: Includes AFC Champions League and AFC Cup)		Other		Total	
Club	Season	Division	Apps	Goals	Apps	Goals	Apps	Goals	Apps	Goals	Apps	Goals	Apps	Goals
Al-Qadsiah	2004–05	Premier League	10	3	—		4	1	—		4 (Note: Appearances in Prince Faisal bin Fahd Cup)	2	18	6
Al-Qadsiah	2005–06	Premier League	17	5	—		0	0	—		7 (Note: Six appearances and four goals in Prince Faisal bin Fahd Cup, one appearance in Arab Champions League)	4	24	9
Al-Qadsiah	2006–07	Premier League	16	10	—		0	0	—		3	4	19	14
Al-Qadsiah	2007–08	Premier League	16	3	—		1	1	—		5	2	22	6
Al-Qadsiah	Total		59	21	0	0	5	2	0	0	19	12	83	35
Al-Shabab	2008–09	Pro League	13	2	2	2	2	0	1	0	2	1	20	5
Al-Ettifaq	2009–10	Pro League	21	6	—		1	1	—		7 (Note: Four appearances in Prince Faisal bin Fahd Cup, three appearances in GCC Champions League)	0	29	7
Al-Ettifaq	2010–11	Pro League	24	14	2	3	3	2	—		—		29	19
Al-Ettifaq	2011–12	Pro League	24	11	2	0	4	1	10	4	—		40	16
Al-Ettifaq	2012–13	Pro League	25	8	2	1	1	0	6	1	—		34	10
Al-Ettifaq	Total		94	39	6	4	9	4	16	5	7	0	132	52
Al-Hilal	2013–14	Pro League	12	0	3	1	3	0	3	0	—		21	1
Al-Hilal	2014–15	Pro League	13	2	3	0	1	0	8	3	—		25	5
Al-Hilal	2015–16	Pro League	12	2	2	1	2	0	4	1	—		20	4
Al-Hilal	Total		37	4	8	2	6	0	15	4	0	0	66	10
Al-Ettifaq	2016–17	Pro League	15	3	2	0	0	0	—		—		17	3
Al-Ettifaq	2017–18	Pro League	4	0	0	0	0	0	—		—		4	0
Al-Ettifaq	Total		19	3	2	0	0	0	0	0	0	0	21	3
Al-Jubail	2019–20	Second Division	5	2	0	0	—		—		—		5	2
Al-Thoqbah	2020–21	MS League	23	2	—		—		—		—		23	2
Al-Jubail	2021–22	Third Division	13	4	—		—		—		—		13	4
Al-Jubail	2022–23	Third Division	6	6	—		—		—		—		6	6
Al-Jubail	Total		19	10	0	0	0	0	0	0	0	0	19	10
Career total			269	83	18	8	22	6	32	9	28	13	369	119

=== International ===
Appearances and goals by national team and year
National team	Year	Apps	Goals
Saudi Arabia	2007	3	0
Saudi Arabia	2008	0	0
Saudi Arabia	2009	0	0
Saudi Arabia	2010	0	0
Saudi Arabia	2011	3	0
Saudi Arabia	2012	1	0
Saudi Arabia	2013	4	3
Total		11	3

Scores and results list Saudi Arabia's goal tally first, score column indicates score after each Al-Salem goal.

List of international goals scored by Yousef Al-Salem
No.	Date	Venue	Opponent	Score	Result	Competition
1	17 March 2013	Shah Alam Stadium, Shah Alam, Malaysia	Malaysia	1–0	4–1	Friendly
2	23 March 2013	Gelora Bung Karno Stadium, Jakarta, Indonesia	Indonesia	1–1	2–1	2015 AFC Asian Cup qualification
3	23 March 2013	Gelora Bung Karno Stadium, Jakarta, Indonesia	Indonesia	2–1	2–1	2015 AFC Asian Cup qualification

== Honours ==
Al-Shabab

- King Cup: 2009
- Prince Faisal bin Fahd Cup: 2008–09

Al-Hilal

- King Cup: 2015
- Saudi Super Cup: 2015
- Saudi Crown Prince Cup: 2015–16

Saudi Arabia U23

- GCC U-23 Championship: 2008
