= Hussain Muaaz =

Saudi Arabian footballer

Personal information
- Full name: Hussain Muaaz Fallatah
- Date of birth: October 1, 1985 (age 41)
- Place of birth: Saudi Arabia
- Position: Forward

Youth career
- Al-Shabab

Senior career*
Years	Team	Apps	(Gls)
2006–2008	Al-Shabab		
2008–2010	Al-Hazm		
2010–2014	Al-Riyadh		
2014–2015	Al-Nahda		
2016	Al-Orobah		
2016–2018	Al-Riyadh		
2018	Al Jeel		
- * Club domestic league appearances and goals

Hussain Muaaz (Arabic: حسين معاذ; born October 1, 1985) is a Saudi football player who plays a forward .
