= Edorisi Master Ekhosuehi =

Nigerian footballer

Edo Ekhosuehi
Personal information
- Full name: Edorisi Master Ekhosuehi
- Date of birth: 20 May 1984 (age 42)
- Place of birth: Benin City, Nigeria
- Height: 1.81 m (5 ft 11 in)
- Position: Striker

Team information
- Current team: FC Locarno
- Number: 26

Senior career*
Years	Team	Apps	(Gls)
1999–2004	Shooting Stars FC		
2004–2005	Espérance Tunis		
2005–2006	Le Mans	10	(0)
2006	→ AS Livorno (loan)	9	(0)
2007–2010	Yverdon-Sport	43	(13)
2010	Al-Qadisiyah	6	(3)
2011–2012	Hammam-Lif	15	(0)
2012–	FC Locarno	5	(0)
- * Club domestic league appearances and goals

Edorisi Master Ekhosuehi (born 20 May 1984 in Benin City) is a Nigerian footballer who currently plays for FC Locarno in the Swiss Challenge League.

== Career ==
Edo arrived Le Mans in summer 2005, signed a one-year contract. On 5 July 2006, he signed for Swiss French speaking side Yverdon-Sport.
