= Christian Wilhelmsson =

Swedish footballer (born 1979)

Christian "Chippen" Wilhelmsson
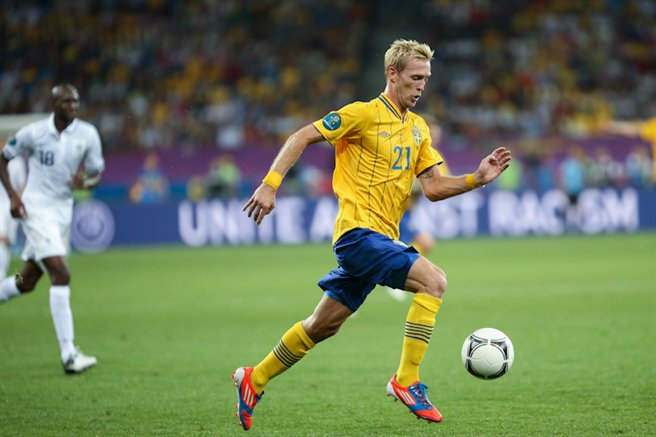
- Wilhelmsson playing for Sweden at Euro 2012

Personal information
- Full name: Christian Ulf Wilhelmsson
- Date of birth: 8 December 1979 (age 46)
- Place of birth: Malmö, Sweden
- Height: 1.77 m (5 ft 10 in)
- Position: Winger

Youth career
- 1988–1997: Mjällby AIF

Senior career*
Years	Team	Apps	(Gls)
1997–1999	Mjällby AIF	52	(11)
2000–2003	Stabæk	84	(25)
2003–2006	Anderlecht	90	(13)
2006–2008	Nantes	13	(0)
2007	→ Roma (loan)	19	(1)
2007–2008	→ Bolton Wanderers (loan)	8	(0)
2008	→ Deportivo La Coruña (loan)	15	(1)
2008–2012	Al-Hilal	69	(24)
2011–2012	→ Al Ahli (loan)	11	(0)
2012	LA Galaxy	5	(1)
2013–2014	Baniyas	8	(3)
2014	Mjällby AIF	12	(5)
2015	Mjällby AIF	3	(1)
2018	Torsby IF	1	(1)
Total		390	(86)

International career
2000–2001	Sweden U21	16	(2)
2001–2012	Sweden	79	(9)
- * Club domestic league appearances and goals

Christian Ulf Wilhelmsson (Swedish pronunciation: [ˈkrɪ̌sːtɪjan ˈvɪ̂lː(h)ɛ(l)mˌsɔn]; born 8 December 1979) is a Swedish former professional footballer who played as a winger. Beginning his career with Mjällby AIF in 1997, he went on to represent clubs in Norway, Belgium, France, Italy, Spain, England, Saudi Arabia, the United States, and Qatar before retiring at Mjällby in 2015. Wilhelmsson won 79 caps for the Sweden national team between 2001 and 2012, and represented his country at the 2006 FIFA World Cup and at Euro 2004, 2008, and 2012.

== Club career ==
=== Early years and Anderlecht ===
Born in Malmö, Wilhelmsson started his career with Mjällby AIF in 1997, playing in three second division seasons with the club. He then spent as many years in neighbouring Norway with Stabæk Fotball.

In the 2003 summer Wilhelmsson joined R.S.C. Anderlecht in Belgium, being an undisputed starter during his spell and scoring nine top division goals combined in the capital side's 2004 and 2006 league conquests.

=== Nantes ===
In 2006, Wilhelmsson moved to the French Ligue 1 team FC Nantes.

==== Loan to Roma ====
However, on 10 January of the following year, he joined A.S. Roma on loan until the end of the season, when the Italians had the option to buy for €3 million. He made his Serie A debut on 14 January against FC Messina, Roma did not take advantage of its option to buy and Wilhelmsson returned to Nantes after the season and immediately starting seeking a new club following the Canaries' relegation from Ligue 1.

==== Loan to Bolton Wanderers ====
Following speculation about a move to various Premier League clubs or Scottish club Celtic, he signed for Bolton Wanderers on a 12-month loan, with an option to make the deal permanent after 20 games. He made 13 appearances all competitions comprised, mostly as a substitute, his debut coming in a 1–3 away defeat against Portsmouth. Wilhelmsson was instrumental in closing the club's signing of countryman Johan Elmander for a record transfer fee, for 2008–09.

==== Loan to Deportivo La Coruña ====
He was again loaned by Nantes, this time moving to Spain and Deportivo de La Coruña on 30 January 2008. He played his first La Liga match against Getafe CF, coming on as a substitute in a 1–1 home draw, and made his first start two rounds later, in a home fixture match against RCD Espanyol (2–0 home win). Wilhelmsson scored his first goal for Depor on 1 March 2008, in a 2–1 home win against Sevilla FC, and finished the campaign firmly established in the side's starting XI – he would start in 13 of his league appearances – as the Galicians eventually finished ninth and qualified to the UEFA Intertoto Cup.

=== Al-Hilal ===
In 2008, Wilhelmsson signed a three-year contract with Saudi club Al-Hilal FC for about €9 million. He helped the club win the league title in his second year, scoring nine goals and making ten assists in 20 appearances; for his contributions he received the Player of the Season award, going on to win four additional major titles during his tenure, including two consecutive Saudi Crown Prince Cup where he scored in both finals.

==== Loan to Al Ahli ====
Wilhelmsson spent the first half of 2011–12 on loan with Qatar's Al Ahli SC.

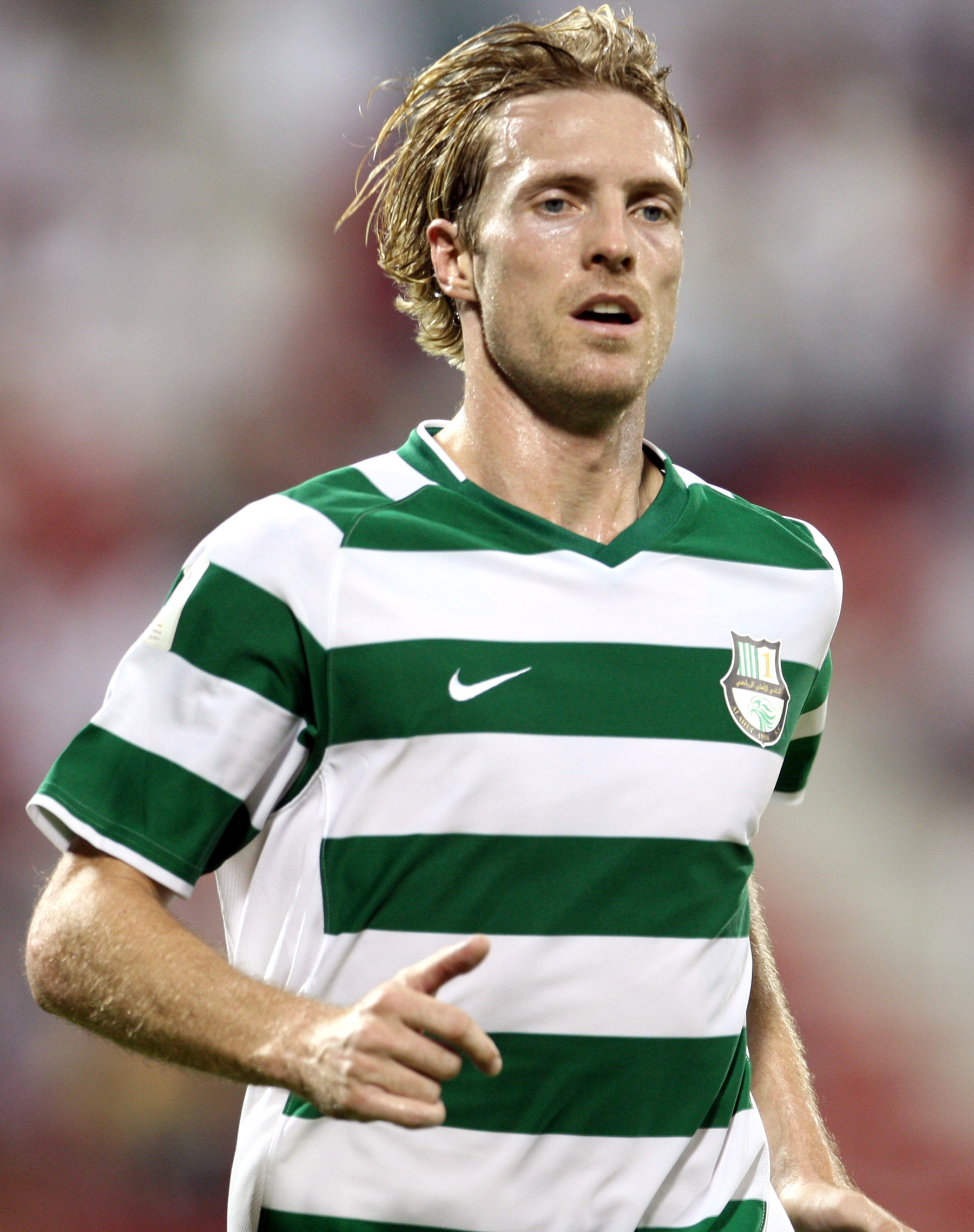
Wilhelmsson playing for Al Ahli in 2011.

=== LA Galaxy ===
Wilhelmsson was announced as a LA Galaxy player on 5 September 2012. He scored in his Major League Soccer debut nine days later, in a 2–0 win against the Colorado Rapids.

=== Baniyas ===
On 14 January 2013, Wilhelmsson signed a one-and-a-half-year deal with Baniyas SC.

=== Return to Mjällby AIF and retirement ===
Wilhelmsson signed for Mjällby AIF and made his Allsvenskan debut during the 2014 Allsvenskan season at the age of 34. After a short spell with former club Mjällby, he officially announced his retirement. However, in August 2015, he came out of retirement to help the latter team retain their status in the Superettan, which was eventually not achieved.

== International career ==
Gaining his first cap in 2001, Wilhelmsson represented Sweden at UEFA Euro 2004, Euro 2008, Euro 2012 and the 2006 FIFA World Cup, featuring in every one of the national team's four games in the latter tournament and starting in two.

On 4 September 2006 he was one of three international players sent home for breaking a curfew during a night out, the other two being Olof Mellberg and Zlatan Ibrahimović. In March 2011, he was involved in a training ground scuffle with the latter.

Wilhelmsson scored his first brace for Sweden in a Euro 2012 qualifier against San Marino on 6 September 2011 (5–0 away win), for his seventh and eighth international goals. He was also selected for the finals in Poland and Ukraine by manager Erik Hamren, collecting three bench appearances in an eventual group stage exit.

== Personal life ==
Wilhelmsson married Russian-born model Oksana Andersson in May 2010, in Las Vegas. Aside from Swedish, he also speaks fluent English.

== Career statistics ==
=== Club ===
Appearances and goals by club, season and competition
Club	Season	League			National Cup		League Cup		Continental		Total	
Club	Season	Division	Apps	Goals	Apps	Goals	Apps	Goals	Apps	Goals	Apps	Goals
Mjällby	1997	Division 1 Södra	6	0	0	0	–		–		6	0
Mjällby	1998	Division 1 Södra	21	4	0	0	–		–		21	4
Mjällby	1999	Division 1 Södra	25	7	0	0	–		–		25	7
Mjällby	Total		52	11	0	0	–		–		52	11
Stabæk	2000	Tippeligaen	24	9	0	0	–		–		24	9
Stabæk	2001	Tippeligaen	25	6	0	0	–		–		25	6
Stabæk	2002	Tippeligaen	26	6	0	0	–				26	6
Stabæk	2003	Tippeligaen	9	4	0	0	–		–		9	4
Stabæk	Total		84	25	0	0	–				84	25
Anderlecht	2003–04	Belgian Pro League	27	5	0	0	–				27	5
Anderlecht	2004–05	Belgian Pro League	32	4	0	0	–				32	4
Anderlecht	2005–06	Belgian Pro League	31	5	0	0	–				31	5
Anderlecht	Total		90	14	0	0	–				90	14
Nantes	2006–07	Ligue 1	13	0	0	0	1	0	–		14	0
Roma (loan)	2006–07	Serie A	19	1	0	0	3	0	3	0	25	1
Bolton (loan)	2007–08	Premier League	8	0	1	0	1	0	3	0	13	0
Deportivo (loan)	2007–08	La Liga	15	1	0	0	0	0	0	0	15	1
Al-Hilal	2008–09	Saudi Professional League	18	4	9	4	–		4	0	31	8
Al-Hilal	2009–10	Saudi Professional League	21	9	8	3	–		9	3	38	15
Al-Hilal	2010–11	Saudi Professional League	22	6	6	2	–		4	2	32	10
Al-Hilal	2011–12	Saudi Professional League	8	5	1	1	–		4	2	13	8
Al-Hilal	Total		69	24	24	10	–		21	7	114	41
Al Ahli (loan)	2011–12	Qatar Stars League	11	0	0	0	–		–		11	0
LA Galaxy	2012	Major League Soccer	5	1	0	0	4	0	–		9	1
Baniyas	2013–14	UAE Division One	8	3	–		–		–		8	3
Mjällby	2014	Allsvenskan	12	5	–		–		–		12	5
Mjällby	2015	Superettan	3	1	1	0	2	0	–		6	1
Mjällby	Total		15	6	1	0	2	0	–		18	6
Career total			389	86	26	10	11	0	27	7	453	103

=== International ===
Appearances and goals by national team and year
National team	Year	Apps	Goals
Sweden	2001	1	0
Sweden	2002	0	0
Sweden	2003	3	0
Sweden	2004	14	1
Sweden	2005	8	1
Sweden	2006	12	1
Sweden	2007	10	1
Sweden	2008	6	0
Sweden	2009	5	0
Sweden	2010	5	1
Sweden	2011	8	3
Sweden	2012	7	1
Total		79	9

Scores and results list Sweden's goal tally first, score column indicates score after each Wilhelmsson goal.

List of international goals scored by Christian Wilhelmsson
#	Date	Venue	Opponent	Score	Result	Competition
1.	13 October 2004	Laugardalsvöllur, Reykjavík, Iceland	Iceland	4–0	4–1	2006 FIFA World Cup qualification
2.	4 June 2005	Ullevi, Gothenburg, Sweden	Malta	3–0	6–0	2006 FIFA World Cup qualification
3.	11 October 2006	Laugardalsvöllur, Reykjavík, Iceland	Iceland	2–1	2–1	UEFA Euro 2008 qualifying
4.	13 October 2007	Rheinpark, Vaduz, Liechtenstein	Liechtenstein	2–0	3–0	UEFA Euro 2008 qualifying
5.	2 June 2010	Dinamo Stadium, Minsk, Belarus	Belarus	1–0	1–0	Friendly
6.	2 September 2011	Ferenc Puskás, Budapest, Hungary	Hungary	1–1	1–2	UEFA Euro 2012 qualifying
7.	6 September 2011	Stadio Olimpico, Serravalle, San Marino	San Marino	2–0	5–0	UEFA Euro 2012 qualifying
8.	6 September 2011	Stadio Olimpico, Serravalle, San Marino	San Marino	5–0	5–0	UEFA Euro 2012 qualifying
9.	30 May 2012	Gamla Ullevi, Gothenburg, Sweden	Iceland	3–1	3–2	Friendly

== Honours ==
Anderlecht

- Belgian Pro League: 2003–04, 2005–06

Roma

- Coppa Italia: 2006–07

Al-Hilal

- Saudi Professional League: 2009–10, 2010–11
- Saudi Crown Prince Cup: 2009–10, 2010–11, 2011–12

LA Galaxy

- MLS Cup: 2012

Baniyas

- GCC Champions League: 2012–13

Sweden

- King's Cup: 2003

Individual

- Stor Grabb: 2005
- Saudi Professional League: Silver Boot 2009–10, 2010–11
