= Ramzi Ben Younès =

Tunisian footballer

Personal information
- Full name: Ramzi Ben Younès
- Date of birth: May 31, 1978 (age 48)
- Place of birth: Tunis, Tunisia
- Height: 1.86 m (6 ft 1 in)
- Position: Defender

Senior career*
| Years | Team | Apps | (Gls) |
| 2006–2008 | Espérance Tunis | | |
| 2008–2009 | Olympique Béja | | |
| 2009–2011 | Al Fateh | 50 | (7) |
| 2011–2013 | Al Naser | 23 | (4) |
- * Club domestic league appearances and goals as of June 21, 2009 ‡ National team caps and goals as of 01:22, 20 October 2008 (UTC)

Ramzi Ben Younès (born May 31, 1978 in Tunis) is a Tunisian footballer who last played for Al Naser in Kuwait.
