= Hassan Al-Otaibi =

Saudi Arabian footballer

Personal information
- Full name: Hassan Al-Otaibi
- Date of birth: August 6, 1976 (age 50)
- Place of birth: Saudi Arabia
- Height: 1.85 m (6 ft 1 in)
- Position: Goalkeeper

Youth career
- 1991–1994: Al-Dera'a
- 1994-1998: Al-Hilal

Senior career*
Years	Team	Apps	(Gls)
1998–2013	Al-Hilal	45	(0)
2007–2008	→ Al-Qadisiya (loan)	22	(0)
- * Club domestic league appearances and goals

Hassan Al-Otaibi (Arabic: حسن العتيبي; born on August 6, 1976) is a Saudi Arabian former football goalkeeper who played for Al-Hilal and Al-Qadisiya.

== Statistics ==
Club	Season	League		Crown Prince Cup		King Cup		ACL		Other		Total	
Club	Season	Apps	G A	Apps	G A	Apps	G A	Apps	G A	Apps	G A	Apps	G A
Al-Hilal	2010–11	18	-13	4	-2	3	-4	6	-7			31	-26
Al-Hilal	2011–12	1	-1									1	-1
Career Total		19	-14	4	-2	3	-4	6	-7			32	-27

== Honours ==
=== International ===
Saudi Arabia

- Islamic Solidarity Games: 2005
