= Bamba Drissa =

Ivorian footballer

Bamba Assouman
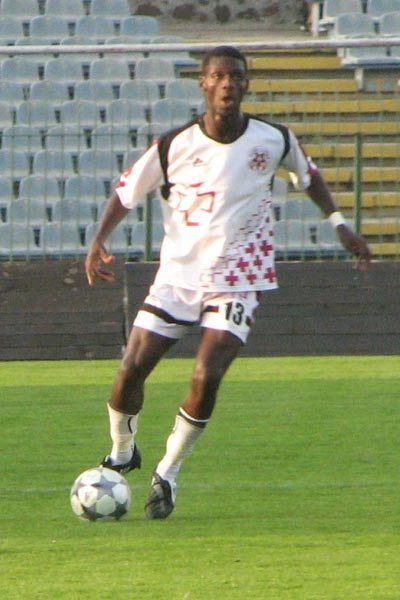

Personal information
- Full name: Bamba Assouman
- Date of birth: 1 January 1990 (age 36)
- Place of birth: Ivory Coast
- Height: 1.88 m (6 ft 2 in)
- Position: Midfielder

Team information
- Current team: Vaslui

Senior career*
| Years | Team | Apps | (Gls) |
| 2005–2007 | US Monastir | | |
| 2007–2009 | Najran SC | | |
| 2008–2009 | Olympique Béja | | |
| 2009–2010 | Volyn Lutsk | 6 | (0) |
| 2010–2011 | Al-Taawoun | 13 | (0) |
| 2011–2012 | Telephonat Bani Sweif | 15 | (1) |
| 2013– | Vaslui | 0 | (0) |
- * Club domestic league appearances and goals as of 16 February 2013

Bamba Assouman (born 1 January 1990), is an Ivorian footballer who plays as a defensive midfielder for Liga I club FC Vaslui.

== Honours ==
=== Volyn Lutsk ===
- Ukrainian First League: Runner-up 2009–10
