= Majed Belal =

Saudi Arabian footballer

Personal information
- Full name: Majed Nasser Belal
- Date of birth: September 6, 1983 (age 43)
- Place of birth: Saudi Arabia
- Height: 1.80 m (5 ft 11 in)
- Position: Defender

Youth career
- Al Rabea

Senior career*
Years	Team	Apps	(Gls)
2004–2007	Al Rabea		
2007–2012	Al-Wehda		
2012–2013	Najran		
2013–2014	Al-Ansar		
2014–2015	Al-Hazm		
2015–2016	Al-Riyadh		
2016–2017	Al-Kawkab		
2017–2018	Al-Hejaz		
- * Club domestic league appearances and goals

Majed Belal (born 6 September 1983) is a Saudi football player.
