= Mohammad Khamees =

Jordanian footballer

Personal information
- Full name: Mohammad Rajeh Khamees
- Date of birth: January 28, 1981 (age 45)
- Place of birth: Amman, Jordan
- Height: 1.84 m (6 ft 0 in)
- Position: Defender

Senior career*
Years	Team	Apps	(Gls)
2000–2008	Al-Faisaly		
2008–2009	Fujairah		
2010–2011	Al-Hazm		
2011–2015	Al-Faisaly		

International career
2005–2009	Jordan	23	(0)
- * Club domestic league appearances and goals as of February 7, 2007

Mohammad Rajeh Khamees (born January 28, 1981) is a retired Jordanian football player who played as a defender.

== Honors and Participation in International Tournaments ==
=== In WAFF Championships ===
- 2007 WAFF Championship
- 2008 WAFF Championship
