= Abdulaziz Al-Kalthem =

Saudi Arabian footballer

Personal information
- Full name: Abdulaziz Al-Kalthem
- Date of birth: 22 November 1987 (age 38)
- Place of birth: Saudi Arabian
- Height: 1.74 m (5 ft 8 1/2 in)
- Position: Midfielder

Youth career
- ????–2003: Al-Jeel

Senior career*
| Years | Team | Apps | (Gls) |
| 2003–2011 | Al-Hilal | | |
| 2008–2009 | → Al-Raed (loan) | 16 | (2) |
| 2011 | Al-Wehda | 4 | (0) |
| 2011–2012 | Al-Orubah | | |
| 2012–2013 | Al-Qadisiyah | | |
| 2013–2017 | Al Kawkb | | |
| 2017–2018 | Al-Diriyah | | |
- * Club domestic league appearances and goals

Abdulaziz Al-Kalthem is a Saudi Arabian footballer.

== Career ==
Al-Kalthem currently plays as a midfielder for Al-Hilal FC in the Saudi Premier League.
