= Nasigba John-Jumbo =

Nigerian footballer

John Jumbo
Personal information
- Full name: John Nasigba Jumbo
- Date of birth: 13 December 1988 (age 37)
- Place of birth: Port Harcourt, Nigeria
- Height: 1.82 m (6 ft 0 in)
- Position: Striker

Youth career
- FC Arugo of Owerri

Senior career*
Years	Team	Apps	(Gls)
2005–2008	El Qanah	61	(36)
2008–2009	Ismaily	17	(6)
2009–2010	Haras El Hodood	11	(3)
2010–2012	Al-Qadisiya	24	(13)
2012–2014	Al-Riffa	32	(19)
2014–2015	Al Hala SC	27	(13)
2015	→ Dolphins FC (loan)	8	(4)

International career^{‡}
2007–2008	Nigeria U-20	8	(3)
- * Club domestic league appearances and goals as of 17 January 2016 ‡ National team caps and goals as of 24 January 2010

John Nasigba Jumbo (born 13 December 1988 in Port Harcourt) is a Nigerian footballer, who currently plays with Saudi First Division (second level) side Al-Diriyah. Elegance, ability and effectiveness are his assets. A technical player with pace and good combination of both legs effectively. A clinical finisher, cool-headed and able to assume several responsibilities in times of need. He is fast and has the ability to go past his marker. He is good in the air and also used to dealing with defenders that are stronger and more experienced than him. However, his main strength is his killer instinct in front of goal.

== Career ==
Jumbo began his career with an amateur club in his native country, FC Arugo of Owerri that won the bronze medal of the Nigerian FA Cup in 2004. Soon after his explosive outing in the Nigerian FA Cup campaign, he signed a three-year professional contract with El Qanah of Egypt in 2008. At El Qanah, he didn't take long before he became the fans favourite where he scored over 52 goals in both league and cup competitions. It was never a surprise when local rival Ismaily signed him in August 2008. On 3 August 2009 left Ismaily and joined to league rival Haras El Hodood for a season. Because of lack of playing time, on 4 October 2010 he left Haras El Hodood and signed a two-year deal with Saudi Professional League side Al-Qadisiya Al Khubar and soon find his scoring boots again. In the quest for trophy, Al-Riffa a Bahraini side snapped him up and he was instrumental to the club winning the Bahraini Premier League in 2012. After a big season with Al-Riffa, he signed for Bahraini Premier League rival Al Hala SC in August 2014. In 2015, he was loaned to Dolphins FC for 6 months.

== International career ==
He was part of the Flying Eagles squad between 2007 and 2008. In 2007, he narrowly missed out of the FIFA U-20 World Cup in Canada due to an ankle injury after an impressive outing before the tournament.
