= Ahmed Al-Dokhi =

Saudi Arabian footballer (born 1976)

Ahmad Al-Dokhi
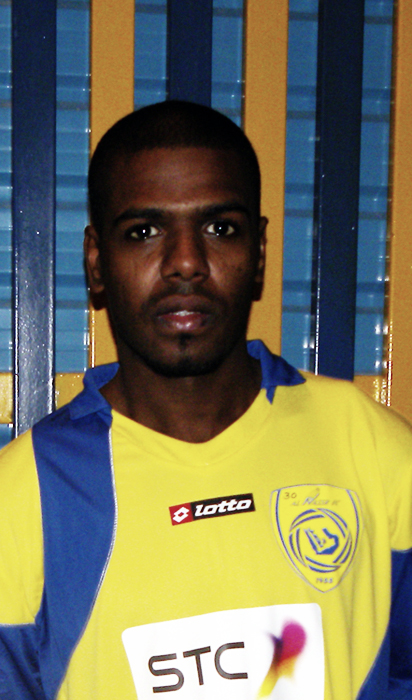

Personal information
- Full name: Ahmad Al-Dokhi Al-Dossary
- Date of birth: 25 October 1976 (age 50)
- Place of birth: Riyadh, Saudi Arabia
- Height: 1.75 m (5 ft 9 in)
- Position: Defender

Senior career*
Years	Team	Apps	(Gls)
1995–2005	Al-Hilal		
2005–2008	Al-Ittihad		
2008–2009	Qatar SC		
2009–2011	Al-Nassr	29	(1)

International career^{‡}
1997–2006	Saudi Arabia	113	(1)
- * Club domestic league appearances and goals as of 13 June 2006 ‡ National team caps and goals as of 23 June 2006

Ahmad Al-Dokhi Al-Dossary (Arabic: أحمد الدوخي; born 25 October 1976) is a former Saudi Arabian footballer who last played as a defender for Al-Nassr.

== Club career ==
Al-Dokhi was part of the Al-Hilal team that won the AFC Club Championship and AFC Super Cup in 2000. He then moved on to Al-Ittihad and helped them lift the AFC Champions League in 2005.

=== Al-Nassr ===
On 11 August 2009, Al-Nassr signed Ahmad Al-Dokhi with a one-year contract. On 30 January 2010, Ahmad played his debut against Al-Ahli. On 10 December 2010, he assisted Saad Al-Harthi to make him score against Najran, they won 6–1. On 29 April 2011, he was sent in the 91 minute against Al-Ettifaq. On 20 May 2011, Ahmad Al-Dokhi scored his first goal for Al-Nassr in his last league match against Al-Ittihad which he lost 2–5. He retired in 2011.

== International career ==
He was a member of the Saudi Arabia national team at the 1998, 2002 and 2006 FIFA World Cups.

== Hounors ==
=== Al-Hilal ===
- Saudi Professional League (4): 1995–96, 2001–02, 1997–98, 2004–05
- Saudi Founder's Cup (1): 1999-2000
- Saudi Crown Prince Cup (3): 1999–2000, 2002–03, 2004–05
- Saudi-Egyptian Super Cup (1): 2001
- Saudi Federation Cup (3): 1995–96, 1999–2000, 2004–05
- Gulf Club Champions Cup (1): 1998
- Arab Cup Winners' Cup (1): 2000
- Arab Super Cup (1): 2001
- Asian Club Championship (1): 1999–2000
- Asian Cup Winners' Cup (2): 1996–97, 2001–02
- Asian Super Cup (2): 1997, 2000

=== Ittihad ===
- Saudi Professional League (1): 2006–07
- AFC Champions League (1): 2005
- Arab Champions League (1): 2005

=== Qatar SC ===
- Qatar Cup (1): 2009

== See also ==
- List of men's footballers with 100 or more international caps
