= Sami Al-Jaber =

Saudi Arabian footballer (born 1972)

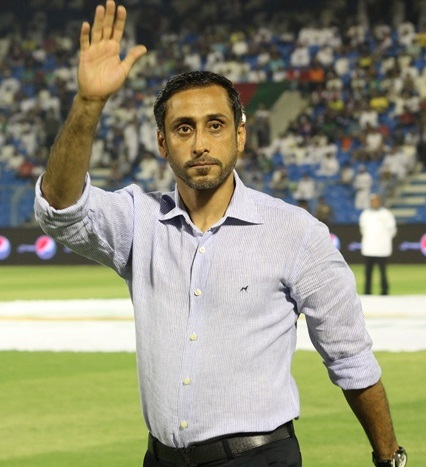
- Al-Jaber in 2013

Personal information
- Full name: Sami Abdullah Al-Jaber
- Date of birth: 11 December 1972 (age 53)
- Place of birth: Riyadh, Saudi Arabia
- Height: 1.76 m (5 ft 9 in)
- Position: Forward

Youth career
- 1986–1988: Al-Hilal

Senior career*
Years	Team	Apps	(Gls)
1989–2007	Al-Hilal	270	(101)
2000	→ Wolverhampton Wanderers (loan)	4	(0)
Total		274	(101)

International career
1992–2006	Saudi Arabia	156	(46)

Managerial career
- 2011–2012: Al-Hilal (assistant)
- 2012–2013: Auxerre (assistant)
- 2013–2014: Al-Hilal
- 2015: Al-Wahda
- 2016–2017: Al-Shabab
Medal record
Men's football
Representing Saudi Arabia
AFC Asian Cup
Winner	1996
Runner-up	2000
FIFA Confederations Cup
Runner-up	1992
Arabian Gulf Cup
Winner	1994
Winner	2002
- * Club domestic league appearances and goals

Sami Abdullah Mohammed Al-Jaber (Arabic: سَامِي عَبْد الله مُحَمَّد الْجَابِر; born 11 December 1972) is a Saudi Arabian football manager and former professional player who played as a striker. He spent the entirety of his career with Al-Hilal, apart from a five-month loan to English club Wolverhampton Wanderers.

Al-Jaber is his country's second highest international goal-scorer with 46 goals in 156 internationals from 1992 to 2006. He appeared in four consecutive FIFA World Cup tournaments, from 1994 to 2006, scoring in three of them. He was also a member of the Saudi squad which won the AFC Asian Cup in 1996. He is widely regarded as one of the greatest Saudi footballers ever.

== Club career ==
Al-Jaber made his Al-Hilal debut in 1989 and spent nearly 20 years at the club. In 2000, he joined Wolverhampton Wanderers on loan, where he made just five appearances in five months. After the club learned that Al-Jaber's father had been taken seriously ill, he was allowed to join the United Arab Emirates side Al-Ain on loan, and this was to spell the end of his time in England. Even so, to this day Al-Jaber remains one of the very few Saudi footballers to have played outside their homeland.

On 21 January 2008, Al-Hilal held a testimonial for Al-Jaber against English Premier League giants Manchester United. Al-Jaber scored a penalty en route to a 3–2 victory over the visitors, in his last game for the club.

== International career ==
On 27 May 1998, Al-Jaber made his 100th international appearance in a friendly against Norway. At 25 years, four months and 16 days old, this made him the youngest male footballer to reach 100 caps.

After gaining a runners-up medal in the 2000 Asian Cup, he appeared in the 2002 World Cup but only played in one game, a 0–8 hammering by Germany. He was ruled out of the rest of the competition when his appendix burst and he had to be rushed to hospital.

== Managerial career ==
Al-Jaber was named as assistant coach of Al-Hilal in 2009, one year after he retired from professional football. He worked under notable coaches like Eric Gerets, Gabriel Calderon and Thomas Doll. In 2012, he became assistant coach of Ligue 2 side Auxerre.

On 27 May 2013, Al-Jaber was named the manager of Al-Hilal, replaced former coach Zlatko Dalić. He became the first Saudi coach to manage Al-Hilal after 14 years of Khalil Ibrahim Al-Zayani in 1999. After his first season in his new career, he was ranked 19th in Football Coach World ranking, even though Al-Hilal decided to replace him. On 19 July 2014, Al Arabi announced his appointment as technical manager.

== Personal life ==
Al-Jaber is an advocate of football reforms, having criticised the Saudi Football Federation for its protectionist policy that prevented Saudi talents from going abroad to play better football after Saudi Arabia became the first team to be knocked out of 2002 FIFA World Cup.

== Career statistics ==
=== International ===
Scores and results list Saudi Arabia's goal tally first, score column indicates score after each Al-Jaber goal.

List of international goals scored by Sami Al-Jaber
No.	Date	Venue	Opponent	Score	Result	Competition
1	16 September 1992	Latakia, Syria	Kuwait		2–0	1992 Arab Nations Cup Group Stages
2	18 April 1993	Singapore	New Zealand		3–1	Friendly
3	24 April 1993	Singapore	New Zealand		1–0	Friendly
4	1 May 1993	Kuala Lumpur, Malaysia	Macau		6–0	1994 FIFA World Cup qualifier
5	17 September 1993	Khobar, Saudi Arabia	Thailand		4–0	Friendly
6	28 October 1993	Doha, Qatar	Iran		4–3	1994 FIFA World Cup qualifier
7	30 March 1994	Riyadh, Saudi Arabia	Chile		2–2	Friendly
8	27 April 1994	Athinai, Greece	Greece		5–1	Friendly match
9	25 June 1994	East Rutherford, New Jersey, United States	Morocco		2–1	1994 FIFA World Cup
10	19 October 1994	Dhahran, Saudi Arabia	United States		2–1	Friendly
11	6 November 1994	Abu Dhabi, United Arab Emirates	United Arab Emirates		1–1	12th Arabian Gulf Cup
12	10 December 1994	Riyadh, Saudi Arabia	Poland		2–1	Friendly
13	8 October 1995	Washington DC, United States	United States		4–3	Friendly
14	28 October 1995	Matsuyama, Japan	Japan		2–1	Friendly
15	19 October 1996	Muscat, Oman	Qatar		2–2	13th Arabian Gulf Cup
16	5 December 1996	Dubai, United Arab Emirates	Thailand		6–0	1996 AFC Asian Cup Group Stage
17	16 December 1996	Abu Dhabi, United Arab Emirates	China		4–3	1996 AFC Asian Cup Quarter-finals
18	31 March 1997	Jeddah, Saudi Arabia	Chinese Taipei		6–0	1998 FIFA World Cup qualification
19	31 March 1997	Jeddah, Saudi Arabia	Chinese Taipei		6–0	1998 FIFA World Cup qualification
20	31 March 1997	Jeddah, Saudi Arabia	Chinese Taipei		6–0	1998 FIFA World Cup qualification
21	25 September 1997	Riyadh, Saudi Arabia	Mali		5–1	Friendly
22	25 September 1997	Riyadh, Saudi Arabia	Mali		5–1	Friendly
23	9 May 1998	Cannes, France	Trinidad and Tobago		2–1	Friendly
24	12 May 1998	Nice, France	Iceland		1–1	Friendly
25	17 May 1998	Cannes, France	Namibia		2–1	Friendly
26	24 June 1998	Bordeaux, France	South Africa		2–2	1998 FIFA World Cup
27	31 May 2000	Győr, Hungary	Hungary		2–2	Friendly
28	5 October 2000	Zarqa, Jordan	China		2–0	Friendly
29	10 February 2001	Dammam, Saudi Arabia	Bangladesh		3–0	2002 FIFA World Cup qualification
30	12 February 2001	Dammam, Saudi Arabia	Vietnam		5–0	2002 FIFA World Cup qualification
31	12 February 2001	Dammam, Saudi Arabia	Vietnam		5–0	2002 FIFA World Cup qualification
32	12 February 2001	Dammam, Saudi Arabia	Vietnam		5–0	2002 FIFA World Cup qualification
33	15 February 2001	Dammam, Saudi Arabia	Mongolia		6–0	2002 FIFA World Cup qualification
34	10 July 2001	Singapore	Singapore		3–0	Friendly
35	10 July 2001	Singapore	Singapore		3–0	Friendly
36	15 September 2001	Bangkok, Thailand	Thailand		3–1	2002 FIFA World Cup qualification
37	21 September 2001	Manama, Bahrain	Bahrain		4–0	2002 FIFA World Cup qualification
38	21 October 2001	Riyadh, Saudi Arabia	Thailand		4–1	2002 FIFA World Cup qualification
39	16 January 2002	Riyadh, Saudi Arabia	Kuwait		1–1	15th Arabian Gulf Cup
40	20 January 2002	Riyadh, Saudi Arabia	Bahrain		3–1	15th Arabian Gulf Cup
41	14 May 2002	Riyadh, Saudi Arabia	Senegal		3–2	Friendly
42	9 February 2005	Tashkent, Uzbekistan	Uzbekistan		1–1	2006 FIFA World Cup qualification
43	8 June 2005	Riyadh, Saudi Arabia	Uzbekistan		3–0	2006 FIFA World Cup qualification
44	8 June 2005	Riyadh, Saudi Arabia	Uzbekistan		3–0	2006 FIFA World Cup qualification
45	15 March 2006	Riyadh, Saudi Arabia	Iraq		2–2	Friendly
46	14 June 2006	Munich, Germany	Tunisia		2–2	2006 FIFA World Cup

== Honours ==
Al-Hilal

- Saudi Premier League: 1989–90, 1995–96, 1997–98, 2001–02, 2004–05
- Crown Prince Cup: 1995, 2000, 2003, 2004–05, 2005–06
- Saudi Federation Cup: 1990, 1993, 1996, 2000
- Saudi Founder's Cup: 2000
- AFC Champions League: 2000
- Asian Cup Winners Cup: 1996–97, 2001–02
- Asian Super Cup: 1997
- Arab Champions League: 1994, 1995
- Arab Super Cup: 2001
- GCC Club Cup: 1998
- Saudi-Egyptian Super Cup: 2001

Saudi Arabia

- AFC Asian Cup: 1996; runner-up: 2000
- FIFA Confederations Cup runner-up: 1992
- Arabian Gulf Cup: 1994, 2002

Individual

- AFC Player of the Month: February 1998
- AFC Goal of the Month: April 1998
- Saudi Premier League top scorer: 1989–90 (16), 1992–93 (19)
- Arab Champions League top scorer: 1994 (7), 2004–05 (9)
- Arab Club Champions Cup Best Player: 1994
- Gulf Club Champions Cup top scorer: 1998
- Arab Club Champions Cup All-time top scorer
- Arab Super Cup top scorer: 2001
- AFC Fans' All-time XI at the FIFA World Cup: 2020

== See also ==
- List of men's footballers with 100 or more international caps
