= Fahd Al-Mehallel =

Saudi Arabian footballer (born 1970)

Fahad Al-Mehallel
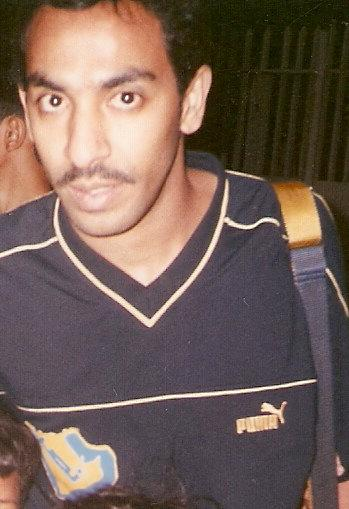

Personal information
- Full name: Fahad Al-Mehallel Al-Dosari
- Date of birth: November 11, 1970 (age 55)
- Place of birth: Riyadh, Saudi Arabia
- Height: 1.70 m (5 ft 7 in)
- Position: Striker

Senior career*
Years	Team	Apps	(Gls)
1988–1999	Al-Shabab		(76)
2000–2002	Al-Nassr		(7)

International career
1992–1999	Saudi Arabia	87	(26)
- * Club domestic league appearances and goals

Fahad Al Mehalel (Arabic: فهد المهلل, born November 11, 1970) is a Saudi Arabian former football striker.

He played at a club level for Al-Shabab and Al-Nassr. For the national team, he played at the World Cups in 1994 and 1998 FIFA World Cup, as well as the 1997 FIFA Confederations Cup. He also played at the 1989 FIFA World Youth Championship.

== Career statistics ==
=== Club ===
As of match played 1 July 2023

Club	Season	League			King Cup		Saudi Crown Prince Cup		Saudi Federation Cup		GCC Champions League		Other		Total	
Club	Season	Division	Apps	Goals	Apps	Goals	Apps	Goals	Apps	Goals	Apps	Goals	Apps	Goals	Goals	Apps
Al Shabab	1987–88	SPL		1						5						
Al Shabab	1988–89	SPL		8		0				6						
Al Shabab	1989–90	SPL		0		3										
Al Shabab	1990–91	SPL		20												
Al Shabab	1991–92	SPL		4												
Al Shabab	1992–93	SPL		3								1		2 (Note: 1 Goal in 1992 Arab Club Champions Cup) (Note: 1 Goal in 1992–93 Asian Club Championship)		
Al Shabab	1993–94	SPL		0								1				
Al Shabab	1994–95	SPL		4				0						1 (Note: 1 Goal in 1994–95 Asian Club Championship)		
Al Shabab	1995–96	SPL		2				4						2 (Note: 2 Goal in 1995 Arab Super Cup)		
Al Shabab	1996–97	SPL		1				0								
Al Shabab	1997–98	SPL		14				0								
Al Shabab	1998–99	SPL		2										1 (Note: 1 Goal in 1998 Arab Super Cup)		
Al Shabab	1999–2000	SPL		4												
Total				76				9								
Al Nassr	1999–2000	SPL		1												
Al Nassr	2000–01	SPL		4										1 (Note: Goals in 2001 Arab Super Cup)		
Al Nassr	2001–02	SPL		2												
Total				7												

=== International ===
Appearances and goals by national team and year
National team	Year	Apps	Goals
Saudi Arabia	1992	9	1
Saudi Arabia	1993	16	6
Saudi Arabia	1994	12	3
Saudi Arabia	1995	7	1
Saudi Arabia	1996	17	10
Saudi Arabia	1997	19	4
Saudi Arabia	1998	3	0
Saudi Arabia	1999	4	1
Total		87	26

Scores and results list Saudi Arabia's goal tally first, score column indicates score after each Al-Mehallel goal.

List of international goals scored by Fahad Al-Mehallel
No.	Date	Venue	Opponent	Score	Result	Competition	Ref.
1	6 December 1992	Khalifa International Stadium, Al Rayyan, Qatar	Kuwait	1–0	2–1	11th Arabian Gulf Cup	
2	18 April 1993	National Stadium, Kallang, Singapore	New Zealand	3–1	3–1	Friendly	
3	1 May 1993	Stadium Merdeka, Kuala Lumpur, Malaysia	Macau	5–0	6–0	1994 FIFA World Cup qualification	
4	20 September 1993	Prince Saud bin Jalawi Sports City, Khobar, Saudi Arabia	Thailand	3–0	3–0	Friendly	
5	6 October 1993	Prince Saud bin Jalawi Sports City, Khobar, Saudi Arabia	Russia	4–2	4–2	Friendly	
6	18 October 1993	Khalifa International Stadium, Al Rayyan, Qatar	North Korea	1–0	2–1	1994 FIFA World Cup qualification	
7	28 October 1993	Khalifa International Stadium, Al Rayyan, Qatar	Iran	2–0	4–3	1994 FIFA World Cup qualification	
8	20 April 1994	Stade de Bon Rencontre, Toulon, France	Iceland	2–0	2–0	Friendly	
9	10 November 1994	Zayed Sports City Stadium, Abu Dhabi, United Arab Emirates	Bahrain	1–0	3–1	12th Arabian Gulf Cup	
10	16 November 1994	Zayed Sports City Stadium, Abu Dhabi, United Arab Emirates	Kuwait	1–0	2–0	12th Arabian Gulf Cup	
11	8 October 1995	Robert F. Kennedy Memorial Stadium, Washington, D.C., United States	United States	2–0	3–4	Friendly	
12	19 September 1996	Prince Faisal bin Fahd Sports City, Riyadh, Saudi Arabia	Zambia	1–0	2–1	Friendly	
13	19 September 1996	Prince Faisal bin Fahd Sports City, Riyadh, Saudi Arabia	Zambia	2–1	2–1	Friendly	
14	15 October 1996	Sultan Qaboos Sports Complex, Muscat, Oman	Oman	1–0	1–0	13th Arabian Gulf Cup	
15	21 October 1996	Sultan Qaboos Sports Complex, Muscat, Oman	Bahrain	3–1	3–1	13th Arabian Gulf Cup	
16	29 November 1996	Prince Saud bin Jalawi Sports City, Khobar, Saudi Arabia	Indonesia	1–0	4–1	Friendly	
17	29 November 1996	Prince Saud bin Jalawi Sports City, Khobar, Saudi Arabia	Indonesia	2–0	4–1	Friendly	
18	5 December 1996	Maktoum bin Rashid Al Maktoum Stadium, Dubai, United Arab Emirates	Thailand	2–0	6–0	1996 AFC Asian Cup	
19	5 December 1996	Maktoum bin Rashid Al Maktoum Stadium, Dubai, United Arab Emirates	Thailand	6–0	6–0	1996 AFC Asian Cup	
20	8 December 1996	Maktoum bin Rashid Al Maktoum Stadium, Dubai, United Arab Emirates	Iraq	1–0	1–0	1996 AFC Asian Cup	
21	16 December 1996	Zayed Sports City Stadium, Abu Dhabi, United Arab Emirates	China	3–2	4–3	1996 AFC Asian Cup	
22	9 March 1997	Hougang Stadium, Hougang, Singapore	Indonesia	3–0	4–0	Friendly	
23	20 March 1997	Shah Alam Stadium, Shah Alam, Malaysia	Bangladesh	4–1	4–1	1998 FIFA World Cup qualification	
24	14 September 1997	King Fahd Sports City, Riyadh, Saudi Arabia	Kuwait	1–1	2–1	1998 FIFA World Cup qualification	
25	11 October 1997	King Fahd Sports City, Riyadh, Saudi Arabia	Qatar	1–0	1–0	1998 FIFA World Cup qualification	
26	11 September 1999	Rufaro Stadium, Harare, Zimbabwe	Zambia	–	2–1	Friendly	
