= Robert Saba =

Ghanaian footballer (born 1975)

Robert Saba (born 2 January 1975) is a Ghanaian former professional footballer who played as a midfielder for Accra Hearts of Oak for most of his career. He also played for the Ghana national team.

== Club career ==
Saba started his career with Advanced Stars before joining Voradep Ho where he won the Ghanaian FA Cup in his first season in 1991–92. He joined Accra Hearts of Oak in 1992–93 season later winning the Ghanaian FA Cup in 1993–94. He joined Al Hilal SFC and won the Saudi Premier League in 1995–96, his only season with the club.

Saba returned to Accra Hearts of Oak in 1996. He further went on to win the Ghana Premier League in five consecutive seasons from 1996–97 to 2001 and winning the Ghanaian FA Cup in 1999 and 2000. He moved to Haras El Hodoud SC in the Egyptian Premier League where he spent two seasons from 2002 to 2004.

== International career ==
Saba played for all national team ranks for Ghana from U-17, U-20, U-23 to the senior national team. Saba featured for Ghana national team twice between 1993 and 1995. He is known for being one of the few Ghanaian footballers to have played for all Ghana's national teams. He played a total 39 matches for all national teams, featuring 18 times for the senior side, the Black Stars.

== Personal life ==
Saba is the brother of fellow Ghanaian international Christian Saba who played for Bayern Munich II for most of his career. The duo lost their father Daniel Saba in 2017.

== Honours ==
Voradep Ho

- Ghanaian FA Cup: 1991–92

Hearts of Oak

- Ghana Premier League: 1996–97, 1997–98, 1999, 2000, 2001
- Ghanaian FA Cup: 1992, 1996, 1998, 1999, 2000
- Ghana Super Cup: 1992, 1997, 1998
- CAF Champions League: 2000
- CAF Super Cup: 2001

Al Hilal

- Saudi Premier League: 1995–96
