= 1994 Arab Club Champions Cup =

بطولة الأندية العربية لأبطال الدوري 1994

Tournament details
- Host country: Saudi Arabia
- City: Riyadh
- Dates: 21 - 30 November
- Teams: 8 (from 2 confederations) (from 7 associations)
- Venue: (in 1 host city)

Final positions
- Champions: (Saudi Arabia) Al-Hilal (1st title)
- Runners-up: (Saudi Arabia) Al-Ittihad

Tournament statistics
- Matches played: 15
- Goals scored: 46 (3.07 per match)
- Top scorer: (Saudi Arabia) Sami Al-Jaber (7 goals)
- Best player: (Saudi Arabia) Sami Al-Jaber
- Fair play award: (Saudi Arabia) Al-Hilal

The 1994 Arab Club Champions Cup was played in Saudi Arabia in the city of Riyadh. Al-Hilal won the championship for the first time beating in the final Al-Ittihad.

== Participants ==
Participants
Zone	Team	Qualifying method
	(Saudi Arabia) Al-Hilal	Hosts & 1992–93 Saudi Premier League Runners up
Zone 1	(Kuwait) Al-Arabi	1992–93 Kuwaiti League Winners
Zone 1	(Qatar) Al-Ittihad	1992–93 Qatari League 3rd
Zone 2	(Saudi Arabia) Al-Ittihad	1992–93 Saudi Premier League 3rd
Zone 2	(Sudan) Al-Merrikh	1992–93 Sudan League Winners
Zone 3	(Algeria) JS Kabylie	1992–93 Algerian Championnat National 4th
Zone 3	(Tunisia) CA Bizertin	1992–93 Tunisian League 3rd
Zone 4	(Palestine) Shabab Rafah	Gaza Premier League winners

== Preliminary round ==
=== Zone 1 (Gulf Area) ===
Al-Arabi & Al-Ittihad Doha advanced to the final tournament.

=== Zone 2 (Red Sea) ===
Al-Ittihad Jeddah & Al-Merrikh advanced to the final tournament.

=== Zone 3 (North Africa) ===
16 September 1994

JS Kabylie (Algeria)	3–0	(Tunisia) CA Bizertin
Djahnit 16'; Hadj Adlane 34'; Boubrit 70'

1 November Stadium, Tizi Ouzou
2 October 1994
14:00

CA Bizertin (Tunisia)	2–3	(Algeria) JS Kabylie
Trabelssi 22'; Sehbani 84'		Moussouni 17', 78'; Menad 87'

Stade 15 Octobre, Bizerte

JS Kabylie & CA Bizertin advanced to the final tournament.

=== Zone 4 (East Region) ===
Shabab Rafah advanced to the final tournament.

== Final tournament ==
Final tournament held in Riyadh, Saudi Arabia in November 1994.

=== Group stage ===
==== Group A ====
Team	Pld	W	D	L	GF	GA	GD	Pts
(Saudi Arabia) Al-Hilal	3	3	0	0	10	1	+9	9
(Algeria) JS Kabylie	3	2	0	1	7	4	+3	6
(Kuwait) Al-Arabi	3	1	0	2	6	7	−1	3
(Palestine) Shabab Rafah	3	0	0	3	3	13	−10	0

21 November 1994

Al-Hilal (Saudi Arabia)	6 – 1	(Palestine) Shabab Rafah

Riyadh
21 November 1994

JS Kabylie (Algeria)	3 – 2	(Kuwait) Al-Arabi
Hadj Adlane; Moussouni

Riyadh

23 November 1994

Al-Hilal (Saudi Arabia)	3 – 1	(Kuwait) Al-Arabi

Riyadh
23 November 1994

JS Kabylie (Algeria)	2 – 0	(Palestine) Shabab Rafah
Menad 63'; Hadj Adlane 74'

Riyadh

25 November 1994

Al-Arabi (Kuwait)	3 – 1	(Palestine) Shabab Rafah

Riyadh
25 November 1994

Al-Hilal (Saudi Arabia)	1 – 0	(Algeria) JS Kabylie
Said Al Moubarek 1'

Riyadh

==== Group B ====
Team	Pld	W	D	L	GF	GA	GD	Pts
(Saudi Arabia) Al-Ittihad	3	2	1	0	4	2	+2	7
(Tunisia) CA Bizertin	3	1	1	1	2	2	0	4
(Qatar) Al-Ittihad	3	1	0	2	3	4	−1	3
(Sudan) Al-Merrikh	3	1	0	2	2	3	−1	3

22 November 1994

Al-Ittihad (Saudi Arabia)	1 – 1	(Tunisia) CA Bizertin

Riyadh
22 November 1994

Al-Merrikh (Sudan)	2 – 1	(Qatar) Al-Ittihad

Riyadh

24 November 1994

Al-Ittihad (Saudi Arabia)	1 – 0	(Sudan) Al-Merrikh

Riyadh
24 November 1994

CA Bizertin (Tunisia)	0 – 1	(Qatar) Al-Ittihad

Riyadh

26 November 1994

Al-Ittihad (Saudi Arabia)	2 – 1	(Qatar) Al-Ittihad

Riyadh
26 November 1994

CA Bizertin (Tunisia)	1 – 0	(Sudan) Al-Merrikh

Riyadh

=== Knockout stage ===
Semi-finals
– Riyadh
(Saudi Arabia) Al-Hilal	4
(Tunisia) CA Bizertin	1
– Riyadh
(Saudi Arabia) Al-Ittihad (aet)	3
(Algeria) JS Kabylie	1

Final
– Riyadh
(Saudi Arabia) Al-Hilal (p)	0 (4)
(Saudi Arabia) Al-Ittihad	0 (3)

==== Semi-finals ====
28 November 1994
16:30

Al-Hilal (Saudi Arabia)	4–1	(Tunisia) CA Bizertin
Samy El-Djaber 24', 52'; Ahmed Bahdja 73', 80'		Said Boutaleb 30'

King Fahd International Stadium, Riyadh
Attendance: 30.000
Referee: (United Arab Emirates)

28 November 1994
18:30

Al-Ittihad (Saudi Arabia)	3–1 (a.e.t.)	(Algeria) JS Kabylie
Jamil 90+4', 96'; Ismail Harmi 108' (pen.)		Fawzi Moussouni 87'

King Fahd International Stadium, Riyadh
Attendance: 30.000
Referee: (Syria) Jamel Sherif

==== Final ====
Al-Hilal (Saudi Arabia)	0–0 (a.e.t.)	(Saudi Arabia) Al-Ittihad
Penalties
Al-Jaber (penalty scored); Al-Sagrani (penalty scored); Rouissi (penalty scored); Bahja (penalty scored)	4–3	(penalty scored) Hakemi; (penalty scored) Musa; (penalty missed) ? (penalty scored) Jamil; (penalty missed) ?

King Fahd International Stadium, Riyadh

== Winners ==
1994 Arab Club Champions Cup winners
(Saudi Arabia)
Al-Hilal
First title
