= 2003 Saudi Crown Prince Cup =

2003 Crown Prince Cup
Tournament details
- Country: Saudi Arabia
- Dates: 9 January – 9 April 2003
- Teams: 44 (all); 32 (qualifying competition); 16 (main competition)

Final positions
- Champions: Al-Hilal (4th title)
- Runners-up: Al-Ahli
- AFC Champions League: Al-Hilal

Tournament statistics
- Matches played: 15
- Goals scored: 51 (3.4 per match)
- Top goal scorer(s): Al Hasan Al-Yami; Abdulaziz Al-Saran; Bouchaib El Moubarki; Rock Buskapa (3 goals each)
- (Note: All statistics do not include qualifying play-offs)

The 2003 Crown Prince Cup was the 28th season of the Saudi premier knockout tournament since its establishment in 1957. It started with the qualifying rounds on 9 January 2003 and concluded with the final on 9 April 2003.

In the final, Al-Hilal defeated defending champions Al-Ahli 1–0 to secure their fourth title. The final was held at the King Fahd International Stadium in Riyadh. As winners of the tournament, Al-Hilal qualified for the 2004 AFC Champions League group stage.

== Qualifying rounds ==
All of the competing teams that are not members of the Premier League competed in the qualifying rounds to secure one of 4 available places in the Round of 16. The qualifying competition began on 9 January 2003. First Division sides Abha, Al-Ansar, and Al-Taawoun as well as Second Division side Al-Nahda qualified.

=== First round ===
Home team (tier)	Score	Away team (tier)
Thursday 9 January 2003
Al-Khaleej (2)	4–2	Al-Noor (3)
Al-Hazem (2)	2–1	Al-Arabi (3)
Al-Fateh (3)	2–0	Al-Taraf (4)
Al-Hamadah (2)	1–2	Al-Fayha (3)
Al-Ansar (2)	2–1 (asdet)	Al-Watani (4)
Hajer (2)	1–0	Al-Adalah (3)
Al-Tuhami (3)	0–1	Ohod (2)
Abha (2)	6–0	Al-Hejaz (4)
Najran (3)	2–1	Al-Akhdoud (4)
Al-Jabalain (2)	2–0	Al-Rayyan (4)
Sdoos (2)	7–0	Al-Sharq (4)
Al-Faisaly (3)	1–0	Al-Oyoon (3)
Al-Wehda (2)	5–0	Wej (4)
Al-Taawoun (2)	3–0	Marid (4)
Al-Nahda (3)	3–1	Al-Jubail (4)
Al-Orobah (2)	1–1 (3–5 p)	Al-Maseerah (4)

=== Second round ===
Home team (tier)	Score	Away team (tier)
Tuesday 16 January 2003
Al-Maseerah (4)	1–2	Al-Faisaly (3)
Al-Hazem (2)	1–2	Sdoos (2)
Al-Nahda (3)	1–0	Al-Khaleej (2)
Al-Fayha (3)	2–3	Al-Taawoun (2)
Al-Jabalain (2)	1–2	Al-Wehda (2)
Ohod (2)	1–2	Al-Ansar (2)
Abha (2)	2–0	Najran (3)
Hajer (2)	3–1	Al-Fateh (3)

=== Final Round ===
Home team (tier)	Score	Away team (tier)
Wednesday 22 January 2003
Hajer (2)	0–0 (6–7 p)	Al-Nahda (3)
Al-Ansar (2)	1–1 (5–4 p)	Al-Wehda (2)
Al-Taawoun (2)	4–3 (asdet)	Sdoos (2)
Al-Faisaly (3)	0–0 (4–5 p)	Abha (2)

== Bracket ==
Round of 16
A	Al-Tai	0
H	Al-Ittihad	5
H	Al-Riyadh	2
A	Al-Ansar	1
H	Al-Qadisiyah	1
A	Al-Hilal (asdet)	2
H	Abha	2
A	Al-Shoulla	3
H	Al-Ahli	4
A	Al-Nahda	1
H	Al-Shabab	4
A	Al-Najma	0
H	Al-Taawoun	1
A	Al-Nassr	4
H	Al-Ettifaq	3
A	Al-Raed	0

Quarter-finals
H	Al-Ittihad	2
A	Al-Riyadh	1
H	Al-Hilal	2
A	Al-Shoulla	0
A	Al-Ahli	4
H	Al-Shabab	1
A	Al-Nassr (asdet)	2
H	Al-Ettifaq	1

Semi-finals
A	Al-Ittihad	0
H	Al-Hilal	2
A	Al-Ahli (pen.)	1 (5)
H	Al-Nassr	1 (4)

Final
–	Al-Hilal	1
–	Al-Ahli	0

== Round of 16 ==
The Round of 16 fixtures were played on 19 and 20 March 2003. All times are local, AST (UTC+3).

19 March 2003 7	Al-Taawoun (2)	1–4	Al-Nassr (1)	Buraidah
15:30	Al-Rashid 21'	Report	Buskapa 50', 55'; Al-Khathran 83'; Al-Bishi 90+4'	Stadium: Prince Abdullah bin Abdul Aziz Stadium

19 March 2003 5	Al-Ahli (1)	4–1	Al-Nahda (3)	Jeddah
20:30	Al-Abdali 2'; El Moubarki 29'; Badra 71' (pen.); Abdulghani 88'	Report	Bilal 73'	Stadium: Prince Abdullah Al-Faisal Stadium

19 March 2003 6	Al-Shabab (1)	4–0	Al-Najma (1)	Riyadh
20:30	Lindomar 18'; Al-Saran 32', 53'; Ricardo 67'	Report		Stadium: Prince Faisal bin Fahd Stadium

19 March 2003 8	Al-Ettifaq (1)	3–0	Al-Raed (1)	Dammam
20:30	Bashir 14', 70'; A. Al-Shehri 45'	Report		Stadium: Prince Mohamed bin Fahd Stadium

20 March 2003 4	Abha (2)	2–3	Al-Shoulla (1)	Abha
15:30	A. Al-Qahtani 45'; Al-Aamry 90+2'	Report	Al-Daajani 19', 69'; Oliveira 82'	Stadium: Prince Sultan bin Abdul Aziz Stadium; Referee: Abdulrazzaq Al-Moqahwi

20 March 2003 1	Al-Ittihad (1)	5–0	Al-Tai (1)	Jeddah
20:30	Al-Yami 7', 55', 60'; Maurílio 53'; Idris 81'	Report		Stadium: Prince Abdullah Al-Faisal Stadium

20 March 2003 2	Al-Riyadh (1)	2–1	Al-Ansar (2)	Riyadh
20:30	Al-Haya'ei 45+1'; Diop 80'	Report	Ali 16'	Stadium: Prince Faisal bin Fahd Stadium

20 March 2003 3	Al-Qadisiyah (1)	1–2 (a.e.t.)	Al-Hilal (1)	Dammam
20:30	Adailton 24'	Report	Al-Jamaan 38'; Badra 114'	Stadium: Prince Mohamed bin Fahd Stadium; Referee: Mujeb Al-Dossari

== Quarter-finals ==
The Quarter-finals fixtures were played on 24 and 25 March 2003. All times are local, AST (UTC+3).

24 March 2003 11	Al-Shabab (1)	1–4	Al-Ahli (1)	Riyadh
20:30	Al-Saran 73'	Report	Barakat 31', 47'; El Moubarki 58'; Al-Meshal 65'	Stadium: Prince Faisal bin Fahd Stadium; Referee: Ibrahim Al-Nafisah

24 March 2003 12	Al-Ettifaq (1)	1–2 (a.e.t.)	Al-Nassr (1)	Dammam
20:30	Fabiano 68'	Report	Al-Janoubi 25'; César 94' (pen.)	Stadium: Prince Mohamed bin Fahd Stadium; Referee: Ali Al-Mutlaq

25 March 2003 9	Al-Ittihad (1)	2–1	Al-Riyadh (1)	Jeddah
20:30	Noor 38'; Al-Qumaizi 84' (o.g.)	Report	Diop 21'	Stadium: Prince Abdullah Al-Faisal Stadium; Referee: Abdul Rahman Al-Zaid

25 March 2003 10	Al-Hilal (1)	2–0	Al-Shoulla (1)	Riyadh
20:30	Al-Khathran 64'; Kanchelskis 74'	Report		Stadium: Prince Faisal bin Fahd Stadium; Referee: Khalil Al Ghamdi

== Semi-finals ==
The Semi-finals fixtures were played on 28 and 29 March 2003. All times are local, AST (UTC+3).

28 March 2003 13	Al-Nassr (1)	1–1 (a.e.t.) (4–5 p)	Al-Ahli (1)	Riyadh
20:30	Buskapa 77'	Report	El Moubarki 16' (pen.)	Stadium: Prince Faisal bin Fahd Stadium; Referee: Omer Al Mehannah
	Penalties
	Tenorio (penalty scored); Al-Janoubi (penalty missed); Al-Halawi (penalty scored); Buskapa (penalty scored); César (penalty scored)		(penalty scored) El Moubarki; (penalty scored) Al-Shahrani; (penalty scored) Abdulghani; (penalty scored) Al-Dosari; (penalty scored) Badra

29 March 2003 14	Al-Hilal (1)	2–0	Al-Ittihad (1)	Riyadh
20:30	Al-Jaber 8'; Suffo 65'	Report		Stadium: Prince Faisal bin Fahd Stadium; Referee: Nasser Al-Hamdan

== Final ==
The 2003 Crown Prince Cup Final was played on 9 April 2003 at the King Fahd International Stadium in Riyadh. This was the fourth Crown Prince Cup final to be held at the stadium. This was the first meeting between these two sides in the final. All times are local, AST (UTC+3).

9 April 2003
20:00

Al-Hilal	1–0	Al-Ahli
Al-Shalhoub 80'	Report

King Fahd International Stadium, Riyadh
Referee: Ali Al-Mutlaq

== Top goalscorers ==
Rank	Player	Club	Goals
1	(Saudi Arabia) Al Hasan Al-Yami	Al-Ittihad	3
1	(Saudi Arabia) Abdulaziz Al-Saran	Al-Shabab	3
1	(Morocco) Bouchaib El Moubarki	Al-Ahli	3
1	(Republic of the Congo) Rock Buskapa	Al-Nassr	3
5	(Saudi Arabia) Saleh Bashir	Al-Ettifaq	2
5	(Saudi Arabia) Nawaf Al-Daajani	Al-Shoulla	2
5	(Egypt) Mohamed Barakat	Al-Ahli	2
5	(Senegal) Mamoune Diop	Al-Riyadh	2

== See also ==
- 2002–03 Saudi Premier League
- 2004 AFC Champions League
