= Hathloul bin Abdulaziz Al Saud =

Saudi royal and businessman (1941–2012)

- Born: 1941
- Died: 29 September 2012 (aged 70–71); Switzerland
- Burial: 30 September 2012; Al Adl Cemetery, Mecca, Saudi Arabia
Names
- Hathloul bin Abdulaziz bin Abdul Rahman Al Saud
- House: Al Saud
- Father: King Abdulaziz
- Mother: Saida al Yamaniyah

Hathloul bin Abdulaziz Al Saud (Arabic: هذلول بن عبد العزيز آل سعود; 1941 – 29 September 2012) was a senior prince of the House of Saud, and a member of the Kingdom of Saudi Arabia's Allegiance Council.

== Early life ==
Prince Hathloul was born in Riyadh in 1941. He was King Abdulaziz's thirty-second son. His mother was a Yemeni woman, Saida al Yamaniyah, and a concubine of the King.

== Succession and activities ==
Prince Hathloul was a businessman and vice chair of the Najd corporation.

In August 2009 the Washington Institute for Near East Policy identified him as a potential successor to King Abdullah of Saudi Arabia. In 2012, Foreign Policy cited him as one of four potential heirs apparent after Crown Prince Salman bin Abdulaziz, adding that Prince Hathloul was much less well-known than the other three candidates.

Prince Hathloul served as president of Al-Hilal FC three times.

== Family ==
Wife	Children
'Abta bint Abdullah bin Rasheed	Reema (died 18 May 2007), Lamia (died February 2021), Nouf, Bandari, Abdulaziz, Najoud
Maddawi Al Dagaythr (divorced)	Fahda, Noura (deceased)
Dr. Salwa bint Ahmed Al Ahmed (divorced)	Sara
Mayy al 'Aeesa (divorced)	Tarfa (died January 2021)
Masha'al bint Fallah Al Hathleen (divorced)	Turki
Al Jawhara bint 'Ali bin Qria' Al Mari (divorced)	Saud
'Afaf bint 'Abeed Al Rasheed	Al 'Anood
Ghaada bint Mohamed Al Zalal Al Qahtani	
'Azeeza Al Thanian	
Ameena bint Salem Al Salem	
Hind bint Abd al Rahman bin Mohamad bin Sa'eed Al Khaldi	
Hind bint Marzough bin Shafi Al 'Aseemi (divorced)	

In 2017 his son, Turki bin Hathloul, was named deputy governor of Najran province.

== Death ==
A statement by the Royal Court announced that Prince Hathloul had died abroad on 29 September 2012. His body was taken to Jeddah on 30 September 2012. Funeral prayers for him were held the same day at the Grand Mosque in Mecca.

King Hamad bin Isa Al Khalifa and Bahraini Prime Minister Prince Khalifa bin Salman Al Khalifa sent a cable of condolences to King Abdullah bin Abdulaziz Al Saud and Crown Prince Salman bin Abdulaziz Al Saud on the demise of Prince Hathloul bin Abdulaziz Al Saud.
