= 1992–93 Saudi Premier League =

Saudi Premier League
- Season: 1992–93
- Champions: Al-Shabab (3rd title)
- Relegated: Al-Najma; Al-Tai

Statistics of the 1992–93 Saudi Premier League.

Al-Shabab became the first club to win the championship for three seasons in succession when defeating Al-Hilal in the championship match. Promoted side Al-Najma were relegated alongside Al-Tai.

== Stadia and locations ==
Locations of teams in the 1992-93 Saudi Premier League

Club	Location	Stadium
Al-Ahli	Jeddah	Prince Abdullah Al-Faisal Stadium
Al-Ettifaq	Dammam	Prince Mohamed bin Fahd Stadium
Al-Hilal	Riyadh	King Fahd Stadium
Al-Ittihad	Jeddah	Prince Abdullah Al-Faisal Stadium
Al-Nassr	Riyadh	King Fahd Stadium
Al-Najma	Unaizah	Al-Najma Club Stadium
Al-Qadsiah	Al Khubar	Prince Saud bin Jalawi Stadium
Al-Raed	Buraydah	King Abdullah Sport City Stadium
Al-Riyadh	Riyadh	King Fahd Stadium
Al-Shabab	Riyadh	King Fahd Stadium
Al-Ta'ee	Ha'il	Prince Abdul Aziz bin Musa'ed Stadium
Al-Wehda	Mecca	King Abdul Aziz Stadium

== Final league table ==
Pos	Team	Pld	W	D	L	GF	GA	GD	Pts
1	Al-Hilal	22	14	4	4	48	24	+24	32
2	Al-Shabab	22	12	7	3	35	17	+18	31
3	Al-Ittihad	22	10	6	6	32	22	+10	26
4	Al-Ettifaq	22	10	6	6	27	19	+8	26
5	Al-Ahli	22	8	7	7	26	24	+2	23
6	Al-Riyadh	22	5	11	6	27	24	+3	21
7	Al-Raed	22	8	4	10	26	31	−5	20
8	Al-Qadsiah	22	6	8	8	21	33	−12	20
9	Al-Nassr	22	7	5	10	20	31	−11	19
10	Al-Wehda	22	5	7	10	16	22	−6	17
11	Al-Najma	22	4	7	11	20	33	−13	15
12	Al-Ta'ee	22	1	12	9	15	34	−19	14

Promoted: Ohud, Al-Nahda.

== Playoffs ==
Semifinals

8 July 1993	Al-Ittihad	2–1	Al-Hilal	Prince Abdullah Al-Faisal Stadium, Jeddah
	Nazar Abbas 79'; Nazar Abbas 84'		72' Sami Al-Jaber	Referee: Mohamed Foda

9 July 1993	Al-Ettifaq	0–0	Al-Shabab	Al-Ittifaq Stadium, Dammam
				Referee: Mohammed Al-Suwaiyel

15 July 1993	Al-Hilal	1–0 (4–3 p)	Al-Ittihad	King Fahd International Stadium, Riyadh
	Shawish Al-Thunayan 79'			Referee: Omer Al Mehannah
	Penalties
	Sami Al-Jaber (penalty scored); Moussa Ndao (penalty scored); Shawish Al-Thunayan (penalty scored); Yousef Jazea'a (penalty scored)		(penalty scored) Jamal Al-Imam; (penalty scored) Bandar Al-Hindus; (penalty scored) Mohammed Al-Khilaiwi; (penalty missed) Ahmad Jamil Madani; (penalty missed) Ismail Al-Hakami

16 July 1993	Al-Shabab	4–2	Al-Ettifaq	King Fahd International Stadium, Riyadh
	Saeed Al-Owairan 12'; Fahad Al-Mehallel 26'; Yahya Jaco 52'; Fahad Al-Mehallel 60'		10' Ahmad Khalil; 40' Hamad Al-Dubekhi	Referee: Abdul Rahman Al-Zeid

=== Third place match ===
20 July 1993	Al-Ettifaq	2–3 (a.e.t.)	Al-Ittihad	Al-Ittifaq Stadium, Dammam
	Ali Al-Fuhaid; Sadoun Hamoud		58' Mohammed Swaid; Nazar Abbas; 120' Mohammed Swaid	Referee: Nasser Al-Hamdan

=== Final ===
28 July 1993	Al-Shabab	1–1 (a.e.t.) (4–3 p)	Al-Hilal	Prince Abdullah Al-Faisal Stadium, Jeddah
	Saeed Al-Owairan 50'		82' Sami Al-Jaber	Referee: Abdullah Al-Khalidi
	Penalties
	Fahd Al-Kaltham (penalty missed); Salem Saror (penalty scored); Awad Al-Anazi (penalty scored); Saud Al-Smmar (penalty scored); Abdulaziz Alrozkan (penalty scored)		(penalty missed) Sami Al-Jaber; (penalty scored) Moussa Ndao; (penalty scored) Shawish Al-Thunayan; (penalty scored) Hussein Al-Habashi; (penalty missed) Yousef Jazea'a

Saudi Premier League
1992-93 winners

3rd title
3rd consecutive title
