= 2001 Arab Super Cup =

بطولة النخبة العربية للأندية 2001

Tournament details
- Host country: Syria
- Dates: 2 – 6 April
- Teams: 4 (from UAFA confederations)
- Venue: 1 (in Damascus host cities)

Final positions
- Champions: (Saudi Arabia) Al-Hilal (1st title)
- Runners-up: (Saudi Arabia) Al-Nassr

Tournament statistics
- Matches played: 6
- Goals scored: 16 (2.67 per match)

The 2001 Arab Super Cup was an international club competition played by the winners and runners up of the Arab Club Champions Cup and Arab Cup Winners' Cup. It was the seventh and last edition and was won by Al Hilal of Saudi Arabia.

== Teams ==
Team	Qualification	Previous participation (bold indicates winners)
(Tunisia) CS Sfaxien	Winners of the 2000 Arab Club Champions Cup	
(Syria) Al-Jaish	Runners-up of the 2000 Arab Club Champions Cup	2 (1999, 2000)
(Saudi Arabia) Al-Hilal	Winners of the 2000 Arab Cup Winners' Cup	2 (1995, 1996)
(Saudi Arabia) Al-Nassr	Runners-up of the 2000 Arab Cup Winners' Cup	

== Results and standings ==
Team	Pld	W	D	L	GF	GA	GD	Pts
(Saudi Arabia) Al-Hilal	3	1	2	0	5	2	+3	**5**
(Saudi Arabia) Al-Nassr	3	1	2	0	5	3	+2	**5**
(Syria) Al-Jaish	3	1	2	0	4	3	+1	**5**
(Tunisia) CS Sfaxien	3	0	0	3	2	8	−6	**0**

2 April 2001

Al Hilal (Saudi Arabia)	0–0	(Syria) Al Jaish

Abbasiyyin Stadium, Damascus
2 April 2001

CS Sfaxien (Tunisia)	0–2	(Saudi Arabia) Al Nassr
		Reinaldo 7'; Al-Bishi 72'

Abbasiyyin Stadium, Damascus

4 April 2001

Al Nassr (Saudi Arabia)	1–1	(Saudi Arabia) Al Hilal
Mahdi 46'		Rôni 48'

Abbasiyyin Stadium, Damascus
4 April 2001

Al Jaish (Syria)	2–1	(Tunisia) CS Sfaxien
Shehada 7'; Malki 67'		Souayah 66' (pen.)

Abbasiyyin Stadium, Damascus

6 April 2001

CS Sfaxien (Tunisia)	1–4	(Saudi Arabia) Al Hilal
Benza 7'		Al-Jaber 47', 90+4'; Al-Shalhoub 56'; Rôni 86' (pen.)

Abbasiyyin Stadium, Damascus
6 April 2001

Al Nassr (Saudi Arabia)	2–2	(Syria) Al-Jaish
Al-Mehallel 49'; Bairouti 77' (o.g.)		Malki 44'; Al-Sayed 69'

Abbasiyyin Stadium, Damascus
