= Saudi Crown Prince Cup =

Saudi Crown Prince Cup كأس ولي العهد
- Organiser(s): Saudi Arabian Football Federation (SAFF)
- Founded: 1956; 70 years ago
- Abolished: 2017; 9 years ago
- Region: Saudi Arabia
- Teams: 14 (Last tournament)
- Last champions: Al-Ittihad (8th title)
- Most championships: Al-Hilal (13 titles)

The Saudi Crown Prince Cup was the oldest Saudi Arabian annual cup competition.

== History ==
The cup was the oldest and first domestic football competition in Saudi Arabia; the first edition was held in 1956–57; five editions were played between regional teams and were not at the club level; the cup was not held in a lot of periods (1965–66, 1970–1972, 1975–1990). In its last years, the competition consisted of teams from the top two tiers of Saudi league football Saudi Pro League and Saudi First Division League. In 2017, it was abolished.

Al-Hilal has won the most titles with 13 wins, also Al-Hilal has contested more finals with 17. Al-Ittihad is the last champion being the winner of 2016–17 season.

== Prize money ==
Prize money:

- Final winner: 2,500,000 Saudi Riyals.
- Final runners-up: 1,500,000 Saudi Riyals.

== Results ==
Season	Winners	Score	Runners-up	Location
1956–57	Al-Ahli	3–0	Jeddah Olympic	Jeddah
1957–58	Al-Ittihad	8–1	Al-Ahli	Jeddah
1958–59	Al-Ittihad (2)	4–2	Al-Wehda	Jeddah
1959–60	Al-Wehda	2–0 (w/o)	Al-Shatea	Jeddah
1960–61	West Team	2–1	Central Team	Jeddah
1961–62	East Team	2–1	West Team	Jeddah
1962–63	Al-Ittihad (3)	6–2	Al-Ettifaq	Jeddah
1963–64	Al-Hilal	4–3	Al-Wehda	Jeddah
1964–65	Al-Ettifaq	3–0	Al-Ittihad	Jeddah
1965–66	Not held			
1966–67	West Team	5–2	East Team	Ta'if
1967–68	West Team	4–3	Central Team	Jeddah
1968–69	Central Team	0–0 (2–0 on ck)	West Team	Jeddah
1969–70	Al-Ahli (2)	0–0 (11–5 on ck)	Al-Wehda	Riyadh
1970–71	Not held			
1971–72	Not held			
1972–73	Al-Nassr	2–1	Al-Wehda	Riyadh
1973–74	Al-Nassr (2)	1–0	Al-Ahli	Riyadh
1975	Not held from 1975 until 1990			
1990	Not held from 1975 until 1990			
1991	Al-Ittihad (4)	1–1 (5–4 on p)	Al-Nassr	Jeddah
1992	Al-Qadsiah	0–0 (4–2 on p)	Al-Shabab	Riyadh
1993	Al-Shabab	1–1 (5–3 on p)	Al-Ittihad	Jeddah
1994	Al-Riyadh	1–0 (aet)	Al-Shabab	Riyadh
1995	Al-Hilal (2)	1–0	Al-Riyadh	Jeddah
1996	Al-Shabab (2)	3–0	Al-Nassr	Jeddah
1997	Al-Ittihad (5)	2–0	Al-Tai	Jeddah
1998	Al-Ahli (3)	3–2 (aet)	Al-Riyadh	Riyadh
1999	Al-Shabab (3)	1–0	Al-Hilal	Dammam
2000	Al-Hilal (3)	3–0	Al-Shabab	Jeddah
2001	Al-Ittihad (6)	3–0	Al-Ettifaq	Jeddah
2002	Al-Ahli (4)	2–1	Al-Ittihad	Jeddah
2003	Al-Hilal (4)	1–0	Al-Ahli	Riyadh
2004	Al-Ittihad (7)	1–0	Al-Ahli	Riyadh
2004–05	Al-Hilal (5)	2–1	Al-Qadsiah	Riyadh
2005–06	Al-Hilal (6)	1–0	Al-Ahli	Riyadh
2006–07	Al-Ahli (5)	2–1	Al-Ittihad	Jeddah
2007–08	Al-Hilal (7)	2–0	Al-Ettifaq	Riyadh
2008–09	Al-Hilal (8)	1–0 (aet)	Al-Shabab	Riyadh
2009–10	Al-Hilal (9)	2–1	Al-Ahli	Riyadh
2010–11	Al-Hilal (10)	5–0	Al-Wehda	Mecca
2011–12	Al-Hilal (11)	2–1	Al-Ettifaq	Riyadh
2012–13	Al-Hilal (12)	1–1 (4–2 on p)	Al-Nassr	Riyadh
2013–14	Al-Nassr (3)	2–1	Al-Hilal	Riyadh
2014–15	Al-Ahli (6)	2–1	Al-Hilal	Riyadh
2015–16	Al-Hilal (13)	2–1	Al-Ahli	Riyadh
2016–17	Al-Ittihad (8)	1–0	Al-Nassr	Riyadh
2017–18	Abolished during tournament			

== Performance by club ==
Club	Winners	Runners-up	Winning Years
Al-Hilal	13	4	1964, 1995, 2000, 2003, 2005, 2006, 2008, 2009, 2010, 2011, 2012, 2013, 2016
Al-Ittihad	8	4	1958, 1959, 1963, 1991, 1997, 2001, 2004, 2017
Al-Ahli	6	7	1957^{1}, 1970, 1998, 2002, 2007, 2015
Al-Nassr	3	4	1973, 1974, 2014
Al-Shabab	3	4	1993, 1996, 1999
Al-Wehda	1	5	1960
Al-Ettifaq	1	4	1965
Al-Riyadh	1	2	1994
Al-Qadsiah	1	1	1992
Al-Shatea	–	1	1960
Al-Tai	–	1	1997

- ^{1}including one title as Al-Thaghar

== Performance by regional team ==
Team	Winners	Runners-up	Winning Years
West Team	3	2	1960–61, 1966–67, 1967–68
Central Team	1	2	1968–69
East Team	1	1	1961–62

== All-time Top goalscorers ==
Player	Nationality	Club(s)	Goals
Elkabech	(Saudi Arabia)	Al-Hilal (20), Al-Ahli (8), West Team (4)	32
Saeed Ghorab	(Saudi Arabia)	Al-Ittihad (9), Al-Ahli (4), Central Team (1), West Team (10)	24
Abdekader Katalog	(Saudi Arabia)	Al-Ittihad (5), Al-Ahli (1), Al-Wehda (8), West Team (2)	16
Sami Al-Jaber	(Saudi Arabia)	Al-Hilal	14
Abdellah Bakr	(Saudi Arabia)	Al-Ittihad	11
AbdeAziz Khalil Al-Haddad	(Saudi Arabia)	Al-Ahli	11
Mohammed Noor	(Saudi Arabia)	Al-Ittihad	11
Mohammad S. Abdeli	(Saudi Arabia)	Al-Nassr	11
Saeed Al-Owairan	(Saudi Arabia)	Al-Shabab	10
Fahad Al-Mehallel	(Saudi Arabia)	Al-Shabab	9
Sérgio Ricardo	(Brazil)	Al-Ittihad (6), Al-Ahli (2), Al-Hilal (1)	9
Rogério	(Brazil)	Al-Ahli (5), Al-Shabab (4)	9
Hamzah Idris	(Saudi Arabia)	Al-Ittihad (8), Ohod (1)	9
Al-Hasan Al-Yami	(Saudi Arabia)	Al-Ittihad	8
Fahd Al-Hamdan	(Saudi Arabia)	Al-Riyadh	8
Khaled Massad	(Saudi Arabia)	Al-Ahli	8
Saeed Laban	(Saudi Arabia)	Al-Wehda	8
Mohssen Bakhit	(Saudi Arabia)	Al-Hilal	8
Mohamed Omar Rajkhan	(Saudi Arabia)	Al-Ahli	8
Rashid Mossalat	(Saudi Arabia)	Al-Ittihad	7
Mubarak Al-Nasser	(Saudi Arabia)	Al-Riyadh	7
Talal Al-Meshal	(Saudi Arabia)	Al-Ahli	7
Majed Abdullah	(Saudi Arabia)	Al-Nassr	7
Mohamed Lamfoun	(Saudi Arabia)	Al-Wehda	7
Saleh Al-Qamber	(Saudi Arabia)	Al-Qadsiah	7
Ibrahim Suwayed	(Saudi Arabia)	Al-Ahli	7

== Hat-tricks ==
Player	For	Against	Score	Date
(Ghana) Ohene Kennedy	Al-Nassr	Al-Najma	3–0	20 April 1995
(Syria) Mohannad Al-Boushi	Al-Riyadh	Al-Tuhami	8–0	9 April 1996
(Saudi Arabia) Fahd Al-Hamdan	Al-Riyadh	Al-Tuhami	8–0	9 April 1996
(Saudi Arabia) Saleh Al-Ganbar	Al-Qadsiah	Al-Jabalain	3–2	24 April 1997
(Saudi Arabia) Abdullah Al-Jamaan	Al-Hilal	Al-Watani	4–0	30 March 2000
(Brazil) Luizinho Vieira	Al-Ittihad	Abha	6–0	2 February 2002
(Saudi Arabia) Al-Hasan Al-Yami	Al-Ittihad	Al-Tai	5–0	20 March 2003
(Senegal) Moudy Ndiaye	Al-Tai	Al-Ettifaq	4–3	16 February 2005
(Brazil) Sérgio Ricardo	Al-Ittihad	Al-Tai	5–1	7 March 2005
(Saudi Arabia) Taisir Al-Jassim	Al-Ahli	Abha	4–0	27 December 2005
(Saudi Arabia) Mohammad Al-Sahlawi	Al-Qadsiah	Al-Rawdhah	8–0	28 December 2005
(Brazil) Rogério	Al-Shabab	Al-Hazem	3–2	28 December 2005
(Guinea) Alhassane Keita	Al-Ittihad	Najran	10–0	3 March 2007
(Ghana) Prince Tagoe	Al-Ettifaq	Al-Rabee	5–0	9 February 2008
(Saudi Arabia) Turki Al-Khodair	Al-Ansar	Al-Hazem	4–2	5 February 2010
(Jordan) Hamza Al-Dardour	Al-Khaleej	Al-Diriyah	3–1	10 August 2014
(Ivory Coast) Didier Ya Konan	Al-Ittihad	Al-Fayha	4–0	15 September 2014
(Jordan) Hamza Al-Dardour	Al-Khaleej	Al-Orobah	3–1	24 December 2014
(Mali) Modibo Maïga	Al-Nassr	Al-Nahda	5–1	12 September 2015
(Algeria) Mohamed Benyettou	Al-Shabab	Najran	6–0	27 September 2016
(Syria) Omar Al-Somah	Al-Ahli	Hajer	6–1	25 October 2016
