= Mohamed Bairouti =

Syrian footballer (born 1976)

Personal information
- Date of birth: 29 January 1976 (age 50)
- Place of birth: Aleppo, Syria
- Height: 1.90 m (6 ft 3 in)
- Position: Goalkeeper

Youth career
- 1994–1995: Al-Hurriya

Senior career*
Years	Team	Apps	(Gls)
1998–2005	Al-Jaish		
2005–2008	Al-Wahda		
2007–2008	→ Telecom Egypt (loan)		
2008–2011	Nawair		
2010–2011	→ Al-Ittihad (loan)		
2011–2016	Al-Hurriya		

International career
1999–2003	Syria	55	(0)
- * Club domestic league appearances and goals

Mohamed Bairouti (Arabic: محمد بيروتي; born 29 January 1976) is a former Syrian footballer who played for Syria national football team.
