= 2004–05 Saudi Crown Prince Cup =

2004–05 Crown Prince Cup
Tournament details
- Country: Saudi Arabia
- Dates: 8 December 2004 – 13 May 2005
- Teams: 44 (all); 32 (qualifying competition); 16 (main competition)

Final positions
- Champions: Al-Hilal (5th title)
- Runners-up: Al-Qadisiyah

Tournament statistics
- Matches played: 17
- Goals scored: 59 (3.47 per match)
- Top goal scorer(s): Sérgio Ricardo (5 goals)
- (Note: All statistics do not include qualifying play-offs)

The 2004–05 Crown Prince Cup was the 30th season of the Saudi premier knockout tournament since its establishment in 1957. It started with the qualifying rounds on 8 December 2004 and concluded with the final on 13 May 2005.

Al-Ittihad were the defending champions, but were eliminated in the semi-finals by Al-Hilal.

Al-Hilal won their 5th title following a 2–1 win over Al-Qadisiyah in the final.

The winner of the Crown Prince Cup earns automatic qualification to the 2006 AFC Champions League group stages. However, as Al-Hilal qualified for the AFC Champions League as league winners, Al-Shabab, the league runners-up, took this Champions League spot.

== Qualifying rounds ==
All of the competing teams that are not members of the Premier League competed in the qualifying rounds to secure one of 4 available places in the Round of 16. The qualifying competition began on 8 December 2004. First Division sides Al-Khaleej, Al-Raed, and Najran, and Second Division side Al-Watani qualified.

=== First round ===
Home team (tier)	Score	Away team (tier)
Wednesday 8 December 2004
Abha (2)	2–4 (a.e.t.)	Al-Maseef (4)
Al-Akhdoud (3)	3–1	Sharurah (4)
Al-Tuhami (3)	0–1	Damac (3)
Al-Orobah (3)	4–0	Al-Entelaq (4)
Al-Jabalain (2)	3–2	Al-Rayyan (4)
Al-Watani (3)	3–0	Al-Majd (4)
Al-Arabi (3)	2–1	Al-Najma (2)
Sdoos (3)	2–0	Markh (4)
Al-Faisaly (2)	0–3	Al-Hamadah (2)
Hajer (2)	2–1	Al-Adalah (3)
Al-Hazem (2)	1–2	Al-Raed (2)
Najran (2)	2–0	Wej (4)
Al-Khaleej (2)	2–0	Al Omran (4)
Al-Fateh (2)	4–0	Al-Oyoon (3)
Al-Shoulla (2)	2–0	Al-Nahda (3)
Al-Taawoun (2)	4–3 (a.e.t.)	Al-Fayha (2)

=== Second round ===
Home team (tier)	Score	Away team (tier)
Monday 13 December 2004
Najran (2)	1–0	Damac (3)
Al-Jabalain (2)	1–4	Sdoos (3)
Al-Hamadah (2)	1–2	Al-Raed (2)
Al-Akhdoud (3)	3–1	Al-Maseef (4)
Al-Taawoun (2)	2–0	Al-Arabi (3)
Hajer (2)	0–2	Al-Fateh (2)
Al-Shoulla (2)	2–2 (3–4 p)	Al-Khaleej (2)
Al-Orobah (3)	1–3 (a.e.t.)	Al-Watani (3)

=== Final Round ===
Home team (tier)	Score	Away team (tier)
Thursday 23 December 2004
Al-Fateh (2)	0–0 (3–4 p)	Al-Khaleej (2)
Najran (2)	3–0	Al-Akhdoud (3)
Al-Taawoun (2)	0–1 (a.e.t.)	Al-Raed (2)
Sdoos (3)	0–3	Al-Watani (3)

== Round of 16 ==
The Round of 16 fixtures were played on 15, 16, 17 and 18 February 2005. All times are local, AST (UTC+3).

15 February 2005	Al-Riyadh (1)	1–3	Al-Qadisiyah (1)	Riyadh
20:00	Faqihi 36'	Report	Sousa 61'; Hakami 77'; Al-Qahtani 83'	Stadium: Prince Faisal bin Fahd Stadium; Referee: Mujeb Al-Dossari

16 February 2005	Al-Shabab (1)	4–0	Al-Khaleej (2)	Riyadh
20:00	Ahmed Otaif 47'; Attram 72'; Akram 76'; Majrashi 86'	Report		Stadium: Prince Faisal bin Fahd Stadium; Referee: Misfer Al-Shureim

16 February 2005	Al-Tai (1)	4–3	Al-Ettifaq (1)	Ha'il
20:00	Ndiaye 44', 69', 90'; Al-Shallaqi 70'	Report	Al-Bashah 8'; Bashir 14', 20'	Stadium: Prince Abdul Aziz bin Musa'ed Stadium; Referee: Mamdouh Al-Mirdasi

17 February 2005	Al-Nassr (1)	4–1	Al-Ansar (1)	Riyadh
20:00	Al-Khair 22'; Mater 31'; Al-Thagafi 75'; Al-Khojali 81' (pen.)	Report	Nami 46'	Stadium: Prince Faisal bin Fahd Stadium; Referee: Saad Al-Suwailem

17 February 2005	Al-Wehda (1)	4–2 (a.e.t.)	Ohod (1)	Mecca
20:00	Al-Jefri 30', 81' (pen.); Kazadi 103'; Al-Kuwaikabi 120'	Report	Suwayed 74'; Al-Olayani 85'	Stadium: King Abdul Aziz Stadium; Referee: Abdulrahman Al-Amri

18 February 2005	Al-Raed (2)	0–1	Al-Hilal (1)	Buraidah
15:50		Report	Al-Shalhoub 12'	Stadium: Prince Abdullah bin Abdul Aziz Stadium; Referee: Ali Al-Mutlaq

18 February 2005	Al-Ittihad (1)	5–0	Najran (2)	Jeddah
20:00	Idris 1', 10'; Sérgio 45', 83'; Al-Otaibi 90'	Report		Stadium: Prince Abdullah Al-Faisal Stadium; Referee: Abdulrahman Al-Qahtani

18 February 2005	Al-Watani (3)	2–2 (a.e.t.) (5–3 p)	Al-Ahli (1)	Tabuk
20:00	A. Al-Shammari 83'; Awaji 95'	Report	Rogério 89', 101'	Stadium: King Khalid Sport City Stadium; Referee: Mohammed Thamer
	Penalties
	Al-Harbi (penalty scored); Rabe'e (penalty scored); Al-Blwi (penalty scored); Al-Yami (penalty scored); Al-Enezi (penalty scored)		(penalty scored) Rogério; (penalty missed) Al-Qadi; (penalty scored) Al-Gizani; (penalty scored) Al-Jassim

== Quarter-finals ==
The Quarter-finals fixtures were played on 3, 4, 5 and 6 March 2005. All times are local, AST (UTC+3).

4 March 2005	Al-Shabab (1)	2–2 (a.e.t.) (3–4 p)	Al-Qadisiyah (1)	Riyadh
20:20	Manga 48'; Abdoh Otaif 88'	Report	Al-Qahtani 45'; Hakami 53'	Stadium: Prince Faisal bin Fahd Stadium; Referee: Khalil Al Ghamdi
	Penalties
	Attram (penalty scored); Abdoh Otaif (penalty missed); Ahmed Otaif (penalty scored); Al-Dossari (penalty scored); Manga (penalty missed); Akram (penalty missed)		(penalty scored) Al-Qahtani; (penalty scored) Hagawi; (penalty missed) Hakami; (penalty scored) Al-Shareedah; (penalty missed) Al-Khaldi; (penalty scored) Al-Haranda

5 March 2005	Al-Nassr (1)	1–0	Al-Watani (3)	Riyadh
20:00	Al-Sagoor 12'	Report		Stadium: Prince Faisal bin Fahd Stadium; Referee: Abdulrahman Al-Tuwaijari

6 March 2005	Al-Wehda (1)	0–1	Al-Hilal (1)	Mecca
20:30		Report	Al-Shalhoub 90+5' (pen.)	Stadium: King Abdul Aziz Stadium; Referee: Abdulrahman Al-Jarwani

7 March 2005	Al-Ittihad (1)	5–1	Al-Tai (1)	Jeddah
20:30	Sérgio 15', 43', 69'; Hamad Ji 60' (o.g.); Al-Saqri 80'	Report	Ndiaye 49'	Stadium: Prince Abdullah Al-Faisal Stadium; Referee: Mujeb Al-Dossari

== Semi-finals ==
The Semi-finals first legs were played on 25 and 26 April 2005 while the second legs were played on 29 and 30 April 2005. All times are local, AST (UTC+3).

Team 1	Agg.	Team 2	1st leg	2nd leg
Al-Qadisiyah (1)	3–2	Al-Nassr (1)	2–1	1–1
Al-Hilal (1)	2–1	Al-Ittihad (1)	1–0	1–1

=== Matches ===
25 April 2005
21:00

Al-Qadisiyah (1)	2–1	Al-Nassr (1)
Al-Qahtani 19'; Sousa 45'	Report	Al-Harthi 35'

Prince Mohamed bin Fahd Stadium, Dammam
Referee: Graham Poll (England)
29 April 2005
20:50

Al-Nassr (1)	1–1	Al-Qadisiyah (1)
Al-Dossari 90' (pen.)	Report	Al-Salem 18'

King Fahd International Stadium, Riyadh
Referee: Olegário Benquerença (Portugal)

Al-Qadisiyah won 3–2 on aggregate.

26 April 2005
20:40

Al-Hilal (1)	1–0	Al-Ittihad (1)
Al-Swaileh 78'	Report

King Fahd International Stadium, Riyadh
Referee: Julián Rodríguez Santiago (Spain)
30 April 2005
20:40

Al-Ittihad (1)	1–1	Al-Hilal (1)
Al-Montashari 7'	Report	Al-Saqri 112' (o.g.)

Prince Abdullah Al-Faisal Stadium, Jeddah
Referee: René Temmink (Netherlands)

Al-Hilal won 2–1 on aggregate.

== Final ==
The final was held on 13 May 2005. All times are local, AST (UTC+3).

13 May 2005
20:45

Al-Qadisiyah	1–2	Al-Hilal
Sousa 18'	Report	Al-Shalhoub 36'; Al-Anbar 82'

King Fahd International Stadium, Riyadh
Attendance: 60,000
Referee: Roberto Rosetti (Italy)

== Top goalscorers ==
Rank	Player	Club	Goals
1	(Brazil) Sérgio Ricardo	Al-Ittihad	5
2	(Senegal) Moudy Ndiaye	Al-Tai	4
3	(Brazil) José Sousa	Al-Qadisiyah	3
3	(Saudi Arabia) Yasser Al-Qahtani	Al-Qadisiyah	3
3	(Saudi Arabia) Mohammad Al-Shalhoub	Al-Hilal	3

== See also ==
- 2004–05 Saudi Premier League
- 2006 AFC Champions League
