= 1997–98 Saudi Premier League =

Saudi Premier League
- Season: 1997–98
- Champions: Al-Hilal (8th title)
- Relegated: Al-Shoulla; Al-Taawoun
- Asian Club Championship: Al-Hilal
- Top goalscorer: Sulaiman Al-Hadaithy (15 goals)

Statistics of the 1997–98 Saudi Premier League.

== Clubs ==
Locations of teams in the 1997–98 Saudi Professional League

Club	Location	Stadium	Head coach
Al-Ahli	Jeddah	Prince Abdullah Al-Faisal Stadium	(Brazil) Cabralzinho
Al-Ettifaq	Dammam	Prince Mohamed bin Fahd Stadium	
Al-Hilal	Riyadh	King Fahd Stadium	(Romania) Ilie Balaci
Al-Ittihad	Jeddah	Prince Abdullah Al-Faisal Stadium	(Brazil) Paulo Campos
Al-Najma	Unaizah	Department of Education Stadium	(Bulgaria) Christov Andenov
Al-Nassr	Riyadh	King Fahd Stadium	(France) Jean Fernandez
Al-Riyadh	Riyadh	King Fahd Stadium	(Saudi Arabia) Khalid Al-Koroni
Al-Shabab	Riyadh	King Fahd Stadium	(Brazil) Oscar
Al-Shoulla	Al-Kharj	Al-Shoulla Club Stadium	
Al-Taawoun	Buraydah	King Abdullah Sport City Stadium	
Al-Tai	Ḥaʼil	Prince Abdul Aziz bin Musa'ed Stadium	
Al-Wehda	Mecca	King Abdul Aziz Stadium	

=== Foreign players ===
Club	Player 1	Player 2	Player 3	Player 4	Player 5	Former players
Al-Ahli	(Brazil) Sérgio Ricardo	(Senegal) Mohammed Manga	(South Africa) Zane Moosa			
Al-Ettifaq						
Al-Hilal	(Colombia) John Jairo Tréllez	(Ecuador) Gilson de Souza	(Romania) George Timiș	(Zambia) Elijah Litana		(Peru) Carlos Flores
Al-Ittihad	(Brazil) Mário Tilico	(Brazil) Toninho	(England) Dalian Atkinson	(Ghana) Ablade Kumah	(Morocco) Ahmed Bahja	
Al-Najma						
Al-Nassr	(Bulgaria) Hristo Stoichkov	(France) Philippe Vercruysse	(Ivory Coast) Sam Abouo	(Qatar) Mohammed Salem Al-Enazi	(Senegal) Mamadou Sow	(Ghana) Ohene Kennedy
Al-Riyadh						(Morocco) Abdeljalil El Hajji
Al-Shabab	(Brazil) Emirson Ferrera	(Kuwait) Bader Haji				(Brazil) Flávio Galvão
Al-Shoulla						
Al-Taawoun	(Zambia) Harrison Chongo					
Al-Tai						
Al-Wehda						

== League table ==
Pos	Team	Pld	W	D	L	GF	GA	GD	Pts	Qualification or relegation
1	Al-Hilal	22	14	3	5	40	24	+16	45	Golden 4
2	Al-Najma	22	13	2	7	34	28	+6	41	Golden 4
3	Al-Shabab	22	10	9	3	46	29	+17	39	Golden 4
4	Al-Ahli	22	12	2	8	38	30	+8	38	Golden 4
5	Al-Nassr	22	11	4	7	34	27	+7	37	
6	Al-Ettifaq	22	8	7	7	28	33	−5	31	
7	Al-Ittihad	22	7	7	8	28	32	−4	28	
8	Al-Tai	22	5	9	8	28	38	−10	24	
9	Al-Riyadh	22	6	5	11	41	38	+3	23	
10	Al-Wehda	22	5	8	9	28	33	−5	23	
11	Al-Shoulla	22	4	7	11	23	36	−13	19	Relegate to Saudi First Division League
12	Al-Taawoun	22	3	5	14	18	38	−20	14	Relegate to Saudi First Division League

== Playoffs ==
=== Semifinals ===
16 March 1998	Al-Ahli	1–1	Al-Hilal	Prince Abdullah al-Faisal Stadium, Jeddah
	Talal Al-Meshal 35'		Yousuf Al-Thunayan 20'	Referee: Yousef Al-Aqeely

17 March 1998	Al-Shabab	4–1	Al-Najma	King Fahd International Stadium, Riyadh
	Emirson Ferrera 24'; Abdullah Al-Waked 27'; Abdullah Al-Waked 40'; Marzouk Al-Otaibi 43'		Sulaiman Al-Hadaithy 35' (pen.)	Referee: Abdul Rahman Al-Zaid

19 March 1998	Al-Hilal	2–1	Al-Ahli	King Fahd International Stadium, Riyadh
	Nawaf Al-Temyat 83'; Khalid Al-Temawi 87'		Hamzah Saleh 58'	Referee: Abdulaziz Al-Dakhil

20 March 1998	Al-Najma	0–1	Al-Shabab	Department of Education Stadium, Unaizah
			Saeed Al-Owairan 92' (pen.)	Referee: Abdulaziz Al-Sulaiman

=== Third place match ===
23 March 1998	Al-Najma	1–2 (a.e.t)	Al-Ahli	Department of Education Stadium, Unaizah
	Mohammed Al-Munif 18'		Talal Al-Meshal 11' (pen.); Bandar Al-Rais 95'	Referee: Zafer Abu Zenada

=== Final ===
25 March 1998	Al-Hilal	3–2 (a.e.t)	Al-Shabab	King Fahd International Stadium, Riyadh
	Sami Al-Jaber 67' (pen.); Sami Al-Jaber 90'; Abdullah Al-Jumaan Al-Dosari 116'		Fahad Al-Mehallel 30'; Fahad Al-Mehallel 37'	Referee: Omer Al Mehannah

Saudi Premier League
1997–98 winners

8th title
