= Saudi Founder's Cup =

- Founded
- 1999–2000
- Nation
- Saudi Arabia
- Number of Teams
- 152
- Current Holder
- Al-Hilal

Saudi Founder's Cup (Arabic: كأس المؤسس الملك عبدالعزيز), is an official Centennial football tournament, held every hundred years, organized by the Saudi Arabian Football Federation to celebrate the kingdom's centenary.

All the Saudi clubs (152 club) in all divisions participate in this tournament. First played in 1999–2000 and won by Al-Hilal.

== 20th century Match ==
16 February 2000
19:20

Al-Hilal	2–1	Al-Ahli
Nawaf Al-Temyat; Jassem Al Houwaidi		Khaled Gahwji

King Fahd International Stadium, Riyadh
Attendance: 67,000

Century Champion
(First Title)
Al-Hilal
2000
