= 1995–96 Saudi Premier League =

Saudi Premier League
- Season: 1995–96
- Champions: Al-Hilal
- Relegated: Al-Taawoun; Al-Raed
- Asian Club Championship: Al-Hilal
- Top goalscorer: Ohene Kennedy (14 goals)

The 1995–96 Saudi Premier League was won by Al-Hilal for the 7th time after defeating Al-Ahli in the final which was played in Jeddah. Al-Taawoun and Al-Raed, both of whom represented Buraidah, were relegated.

== Clubs ==
=== Stadia and locations ===
Locations of teams in the 1995-96 Saudi Premier League

Club	Location	Stadium	Head coach
Al-Ahli	Jeddah	Prince Abdullah Al-Faisal Stadium	(Brazil) Luís Antônio Zaluar
Al-Ettifaq	Dammam	Prince Mohamed bin Fahd Stadium	(Saudi Arabia) Khalil Al-Zayani
Al-Hilal	Riyadh	King Fahd Stadium	(Netherlands) Willem van Hanegem
Al-Ittihad	Jeddah	Prince Abdullah Al-Faisal Stadium	(Brazil) Paulo Campos
Al-Nassr	Riyadh	King Fahd Stadium	(Saudi Arabia) Yousef Khamees
Al-Najma	Unaizah	Al-Najma Club Stadium	
Al-Qadsiah	Khobar	Prince Saud bin Jalawi Stadium	(Germany) Hans-Dieter Schmidt
Al-Raed	Buraidah	King Abdullah Sport City Stadium	(Hungary) Bertalan Bicskei
Al-Riyadh	Riyadh	King Fahd Stadium	(Brazil) Arthur Bernardes
Al-Shabab	Riyadh	King Fahd Stadium	(Ukraine) Yuriy Sevastyanenko
Al-Taawoun	Buraidah	King Abdullah Sport City Stadium	
Al-Tai	Ḥaʼil	Prince Abdul Aziz bin Musa'ed Stadium	

=== Foreign players ===
Club	Player 1	Player 2	Player 3	Player 4	Player 5	Former players
Al-Ahli	(Brazil) Edson Souza	(Brazil) Guga				(Brazil) Paulo Henrique (Ghana) Mark Edusei
Al-Ettifaq	(Senegal) Victor Diagne					
Al-Hilal	(Ghana) Robert Saba	(Morocco) Saïd Chiba	(Morocco) Youssef Chippo	(Nigeria) John Zaki	(Zambia) Elijah Litana	
Al-Ittihad	(Germany) Jens Friedemann	(Peru) Alfonso Yáñez	(Tunisia) Lotfi Mhaissi			(Russia) Vladimir Tatarchuk
Al-Najma	(Ghana) Isaac Kwakye					
Al-Nassr	(Ghana) Ohene Kennedy	(Ivory Coast) Sam Abouo	(Ivory Coast) Youssouf Fofana			
Al-Qadsiah						
Al-Raed						
Al-Riyadh						
Al-Shabab	(Ghana) Ablade Kumah	(Morocco) Saïd Rokbi	(Senegal) Mansour Ayanda			
Al-Taawoun	(Zambia) Harrison Chongo					
Al-Tai						

== Final league table ==
Pos	Team	Pld	W	D	L	GF	GA	GD	Pts
1	Al-Ittihad	22	12	5	5	37	23	+14	41
2	Al-Ahli	22	9	11	2	35	20	+15	38
3	Al-Nassr	22	8	9	5	43	31	+12	33
4	Al-Hilal	22	8	8	6	20	18	+2	32
5	Al-Ettifaq	22	8	6	8	27	27	0	30
6	Al-Najma	22	8	6	8	21	25	−4	30
7	Al-Tai	22	6	10	6	21	19	+2	28
8	Al-Shabab	22	5	10	7	26	24	+2	25
9	Al-Riyadh	22	6	7	9	22	31	−9	25
10	Al-Qadsiah	22	7	4	11	25	38	−13	25
11	Al-Taawoun	22	6	5	11	25	35	−10	23
12	Al-Raed	22	2	13	7	21	32	−11	19

== Playoffs ==
=== Semifinals ===
16 May 1996	Al-Hilal	1–0	Al-Ittihad	King Fahd Stadium, Riyadh
	Mansour Al-Muwain 52'			Referee: Nasser Al-Hamdan

17 May 1996	Al-Nassr	1–3	Al-Ahli	King Fahd Stadium, Riyadh
	Ohene Kennedy 8'		1' Guga; 28' Khaled Gahwji; Hamzah Saleh	Referee: Abdul Rahman Al-Zeid

30 May 1996	Al-Ittihad	1–1	Al-Hilal	Prince Abdullah Al-Faisal Stadium, Jeddah

31 May 1996	Al-Ahli	1–2	Al-Nassr	Prince Abdullah Al-Faisal Stadium, Jeddah
	Khaled Gahwji 89'		2' Mohaisen Al-Jam'an; 63' Mohaisen Al-Jam'an	Referee: Abdulaziz Al-Dakhil

=== Third place match ===
11 June 1996	Al-Ittihad	2–1 (a.e.t.)	Al-Nassr	Prince Abdullah Al-Faisal Stadium, Jeddah
	Jabar Al-Shamrani 71'; Moussa Marzook 98'		62' Khaled Al-Dhaidh	Referee: Ibrahim Al-Omar

=== Final ===
14 June 1996	Al-Ahli	1–2	Al-Hilal	Prince Abdullah Al-Faisal Stadium, Jeddah
	35' Khaled Gahwji		Sami Al-Jaber 37'; Sami Al-Jaber 85'	Attendance: 25,000; Referee: Nasser Al-Hamdan

Saudi Premier League
1995-96 winners

7th title
