= 15th GCC Club Championship =

1998 GCC Club Championship
Tournament details
- Host country: Oman
- Dates: 5–16 February 1998
- Teams: 6 (from AFC/UAFA confederations)

Final positions
- Champions: (Saudi Arabia) Al-Hilal (2nd title)
- Runners-up: (Bahrain) East Riffa

The 15th GCC Club Championship (Arabic: بطولة الأنديـة الخليجية أبطال الدوري) was the fifteenth edition of the GCC Club Championship for clubs of the Gulf Cooperation Council nations. It started on 5 February and finished with the final round on 16 February 1998, and all the matches were played in Oman. Al-Hilal won the title for the second time in their history.

== Results ==
Team	Pld	W	D	L	GF	GA	GD	Pts
(Saudi Arabia) Al-Hilal	5	3	2	0	12	6	+6	11
(Bahrain) East Riffa	5	2	2	1	6	7	−1	8
(United Arab Emirates) Al-Wasl	5	1	3	1	6	6	0	6
(Oman) Sur	5	1	3	1	6	6	0	6
(Qatar) Al-Arabi	5	0	3	2	5	7	−2	3
(Kuwait) Al-Arabi	5	0	3	2	3	6	−3	3

=== Round 1 ===
5 February 1998	Sur (Oman)	2–2	(Qatar) Al-Arabi

6 February 1998	Al-Hilal (Saudi Arabia)	1–1	(United Arab Emirates) Al-Wasl

6 February 1998	East Riffa (Bahrain)	1–1	(Kuwait) Al-Arabi

=== Round 2 ===
8 February 1998	Sur (Oman)	1–0	(Kuwait) Al-Arabi

8 February 1998	Al-Hilal (Saudi Arabia)	2–1	(Qatar) Al-Arabi

9 February 1998	East Riffa (Bahrain)	2–1	(United Arab Emirates) Al-Wasl

=== Round 3 ===
10 February 1998	Sur (Oman)	2–2	(Saudi Arabia) Al-Hilal

11 February 1998	Al-Arabi (Qatar)	1–1	(Bahrain) East Riffa

11 February 1998	Al-Arabi (Kuwait)	1–1	(United Arab Emirates) Al-Wasl

=== Round 4 ===
13 February 1998	Al-Arabi (Qatar)	0–0	(Kuwait) Al-Arabi

13 February 1998	Al-Hilal (Saudi Arabia)	4–1	(Bahrain) East Riffa

14 February 1998	Sur (Oman)	1–1	(United Arab Emirates) Al-Wasl

=== Round 5 ===
15 February 1998	Al-Hilal (Saudi Arabia)	3–1	(Kuwait) Al-Arabi

16 February 1998	Al-Wasl (United Arab Emirates)	2–1	(Qatar) Al-Arabi

16 February 1998	East Riffa (Bahrain)	1–0	(Oman) Sur

== Winner ==
1998 GCC Club Championship
Winners

Al-Hilal
2nd Title
