= Al Hilal SFC =

Association football club in Saudi Arabia

Al Hilal
- Full name: Al Hilal Saudi Football Club
- Nicknames: Al-Za'eem / الزعيم (The Boss); Blue Waves / الموج الأزرق; Blue Power / القوة الزرقاء ِAsia's Club of The Century / نادي آسيا في القرن العشرين; Hilali / هلالي (supporters)
- Founded: October 16, 1957; 69 years ago
- Ground: Kingdom Arena
- Capacity: 26,000
- Owner(s): Kingdom Holding Company (70%); Al Hilal Non-Profit Foundation (25%)
- President: Nawaf bin Saad
- Head coach: Simone Inzaghi
- League: Saudi Pro League
- 2025–26: Pro League, 2nd of 18
- Website: alhilal.com
Home colours	Away colours	Third colours

Al Hilal active departments
Football (men's)	Football (women's)	Basketball (men's)

Al-Hilal Saudi Football Club (Arabic: نادي الهلال السعودي) commonly known simply as Al-Hilal, is a Saudi Arabian professional multi-sports club based in Riyadh. Its football team competes in the Saudi Pro League. The name "Al-Hilal" is Arabic for "the crescent moon". Founded on 16 October 1957, the club is one of three teams to have participated in every season of the Saudi Pro League since its establishment in 1976.

In domestic competitions, Al-Hilal are the most successful Saudi club, having won a record 21 league titles, along with a record 13 Crown Prince Cup titles, seven Saudi Federation Cup titles, 10 King's Cup titles, five Saudi Super Cups, and the Saudi Founder's Cup.

In continental competitions, the club has won a record eight AFC trophies, including four AFC Champions League titles (1991, 2000, 2019, 2021), two Asian Cup Winners' Cups (1997, 2002), and two Asian Super Cups (1997, 2000).

Internationally, Al-Hilal have made multiple appearances in the FIFA Club World Cup and were runners-up in the 2022 edition, becoming the first Asian club from outside the host nation to reach the final.

In September 2009, Al-Hilal was awarded Greatest Asian Club of the 20th Century by the IFFHS. Al-Hilal has a market value of €242.5 million as of 2024, the highest in Saudi Arabia.

== History ==
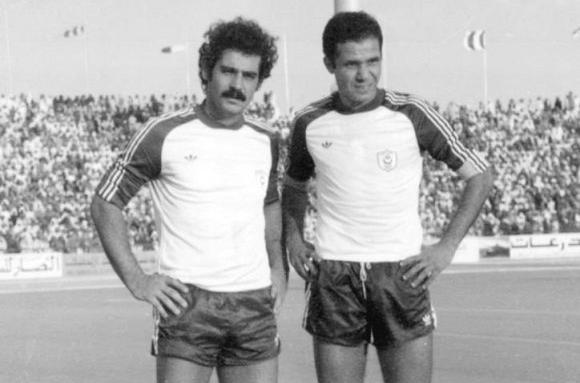
Rivellino and Néjib Limam in 1979

The idea of establishing the club began when the ranks of the Youth Club witnessed in 1957 a serious division among its leaders, which prompted Mr. Abdul Rahman bin Saeed to resign from the presidency of the Youth Club in that year, and many left with him, including a number of prominent players.

The opportunity was ripe for the establishment of a new club at the first-class level to serve Saudi sports, and this was already done when a new club was established on 15 October 1957 in Riyadh. The club's name lasted for only one year before it was changed to its current name on 3 December 1958 by King Saud. He changed the name after he attended a tournament that was contested between the Olympic Club, Al Shabab, Al Riyadh and Al-Kawkab clubs. As soon as the club's establishment, Al-Hilal enjoyed not only grassroots support but also royal attention.

After spending their formative years building a squad, the club made their first mark by lifting the King's Cup trophy in 1961. Al-Hilal won the King's Cup again in 1964, with a penalty shootout victory over two-time Asian champions Al Ittihad. The club also won the Crown Prince Cup in 1963–64.

The club were the inaugural winners when the Saudi Premier League came into existence in the 1976–77 season. Al Hilal also won the league title in 1978–79.

With the success, a number of players and coaches from outside Saudi Arabia joined the club in the 1970s, including Brazilian legends Mario Zagallo and Rivellino.

=== Sustained success (1980–1990) ===
In the 1980s, the club hired Saudi Arabian players such as the figurehead defender Saleh Al-Nu'eimeh who captained both Al Hilal and the Saudi National Football Team, and promoted the player maker Yousuf Al-Thunayan and the young forward Sami Al-Jaber. The club went on to win four league titles as well as four kings cup titles in ten years, two of those being season double's. Al Hilal were the runners-up in the Asian club Championship twice. They were second after the round-robin in the final round in 1986. They reached the final the following year in 1987, but Yomiuri were crowned the champion automatically as Al Hilal were unable to field a team for the final due to nine of the starting players being chosen for the Saudi team's preparation camp that clashed with the date fixed for the first leg.

=== Continental dominance (1991–2002) ===
The 1990s marked a shift in the dominant teams challenging for the title, such as the emergence of Al Shabab as a new contender and force in the league. As well as the resurgence of bitter rivals Al Nassr and Al Ittihad made the league become contested and shared between the four, Al Hilal achieved 23 titles during this period (1995–96, 1997–98, 2001–02). The club continued to churn out talent from its academy with players such as Nawaf Al-Temyat, Mohammed Al-Shalhoub, Abdallah Al-Jamaan, Ahmad Al-Dokhi as well as Zambian defender Elijah Litana. Al Hilal's continental spoil's during this period defined the clubs identity, decadence and standing in the Asian continent for years to come. The first of which came in 1991 when the club won their first Asian title, the Asian Club Championship, beating Iranian club Esteghlal in penalties in the final. In 1997 the Asian Cup Winners Cup and Asian super cup were also obtained. The club won the Asian Club Championship again in 1999–2000, when they scored an equaliser in the 89th minute and won the match against Japanese club Júbilo Iwata in the extra-time, with the final being one of the most exciting and competitive in the competition's history; A super cup was also achieved in the same year. Finally the last of the Asian titles to be secured in this era was the 2002 Cup Winners Cup.

=== League duopoly (2003–2011) ===
At the turn of the century the historic rivalry between Al Hilal and Al Ittihad had reached levels never seen before in Saudi football. Historically, since their first meeting, Al Hilal/Al Ittihad matches have always been aggressive and passion filled spectacles that drew huge crowds due to both teams being from the two major Saudi cities of Riyadh and Jeddah. Each team represented different cities, backgrounds and values. Al Hilal is based in Riyadh the capital of Saudi Arabia, in addition to having traditional Najdi values the club is most commonly supported by the upper and middle class and also enjoyed royal attention. While on the other hand, Al-Ittihad is based in the port city of Jeddah and is commonly supported by the lower and middle class as well as non-Saudi natives giving it the nickname "the people's club". Both teams dominated this era of Saudi football history. Al Hilal won the title/s in (2004–05, 2007–08, 2009–10, 2010–11). Al Ittihad's golden generation in this period of time equaled Al Hilal's two AFC Champions League titles, as well as winning the league title/s in (2000–01, 2002–03, 2006–07, 2008–09). This resulted in both teams exchanging winner and runner-up positions almost every season in the league for ten years with the exception of two seasons.

The pinnacle moment of the era was in the 2007–08 season when Al Ittihad was leading the table the whole season with Al Hilal always right behind in second, the final match day pitted both teams against each other in the Prince Abdullah Al-Faisal Stadium in Jeddah with Al-Ittihad needing a draw at the minimum to clinch the league title at home. Al Ittihad were the clear favourites due to their much superior quality and home advantage. The match began with Al Ittihad leading in possession and attacking opportunities but to no avail. In the 49th minute Ahmed Al-Fraidi crossed the ball from the edge of the box, to which Yasser Al-Qahtani skimmed with a header to the right bottom corner of the goal giving Al Hilal a 1–0 lead four minutes after half time. Al-Ittihad frantically tried to equalise with an abundance of shots but Mohamed Al-Deayea goalkeeping heroics the whole match denied them the goal they so desperately needed, and even more so after Al Qahtani's goal. The referee finally blew the whistle and Al Hilal were crowned the league champions in Jeddah, and under whose management of Cosmin Olăroiu was coupled with the Crown Prince Cup finishing the season with a double. The league is commonly known and remembered with the nickname (Arabic: شعره ياسر) which roughly translates to "Yasser's hair" due to the winning goal being scored when the ball skimmed by Yasser's header veering the ball towards the goal. What made the occasion even more special is that the opposite outcome happened the previous season when Al Ittihad clinched the league title in the last minutes.

Before the beginning of the 2009–10 season Eric Gerets was hired as the new Al Hilal manager. Under his management Al Hilal tactically adopted a very attacking style, combining an already talented local group of players with star foreign players such as the versatile South Korean right back Lee Young-pyo, the powerful and dominant defensive midfielder Mirel Rădoi, the speedy Swedish winger Christian Wilhelmsson and the technically gifted Brazilian attacking midfielder Thiago Neves. This blend of local and foreign talent guided by a tactically astute manager dominated the league and were crowned champions with three games to spare, a crown prince cup was also won in the same season. In the following 2010–11 season Al Hilal continued to dominate domestically and continentally until their semi-final exit from the 2010 AFC Champions League, shortly following their exit Eric Gerets left to become the new head coach of the Morocco national football team. After Gerets's departure Gabriel Calderon took over as head coach of Al Hilal and finished the updated 14 team league as undefeated champion with 19 wins and 7 draws, becoming the second team to achieve this feat after Al Ettifaq. The season also finished with a double as the Crown Prince Cup was defended.

=== Struggle at the continental stage (2012–2018) ===
After their back-to-back league titles and generally consistent success in the domestic front, Al Hilal always seemed to come up short in their continental pursuit since their last triumph in the 1999–2000 campaign. Adding to an already aging local core and departing key players, Al Hilal was in a transition period to rebuild the team that was able to challenge domestically and in the Champions league. Al Hilal reached the final of AFC Champions League in 2014, 14 years after their last appearance in the final. This time they faced Western Sydney Wanderers. The Australian club won 1–0 on aggregate. During this period of time Al Hilal was not able to win the league title for five seasons beginning from the 2011–12 to the 2015–16 season, finishing runner up in three of those seasons, and was only able to achieve five cup titles: Crown Prince cup (2011–12, 2012–13, 2015–16), King cup (2015) and a Super cup (2015) Against arch rivals Al-Nasser held at Loftus Road Stadium, in London.

At the start of the 2016–17 season a string of bad results caused Gustavo Matosas to be sacked and replaced by Ramón Díaz. Diaz's reorganised the tactical shape and style of play in which the team was engaging with as well as the conditioning his players to quickly grasp his philosophy. Taking advantage of the fact that throughout the generations Al Hilal's success largely came from academy players as well as key signings, which the squad already possessed but the group was not in sync or able to reach their true potential. Players such as goalkeeper Abdullah Al-Mayouf was brought back From Al-Ahli because of his distribution abilities, right and left backs Yasser Al-Shahrani and Mohammed Al-Breik were good in chance creation and also in attacking output. Salem Al-Dawsari was talented but unpolished player when he was promoted to the first team in 2011, but has matured to become a key player. These player became the spine of the team and an integral part of Al Hilal squad for years to come. The managerial replacement radically changed the team's performance by playing possession-based attacking football which the aforementioned players turned out to be very adept to. Al Hilal finished the season as champions of the league and King cup with the former being achieved with record points in a season.

The following season continued in the same rhythm with Al Hilal leading in the domestic league and reaching the 2017 AFC Champions League Final. But they ultimately lost to the Japanese side Urawa Red Diamonds 1–2 in aggregate after Carlos Eduardo suffered an ACL tear in the first minutes of the first leg, and Omar Kharbin suffered an injury in the second leg. The team slumped mentally after the defeat and began a series of subpar performances which lead to their exit from the next edition's group stage which was their first time leaving the group stage since 2010. Ramón Díaz was sacked on 21 February 2018 and he was replaced Juan Brown as caretaker until the end of the season, he managed to salvage the season by winning Al Hilal their 15th domestic league title.

=== Return to continental dominance and worldwide appearances (2019–present) ===
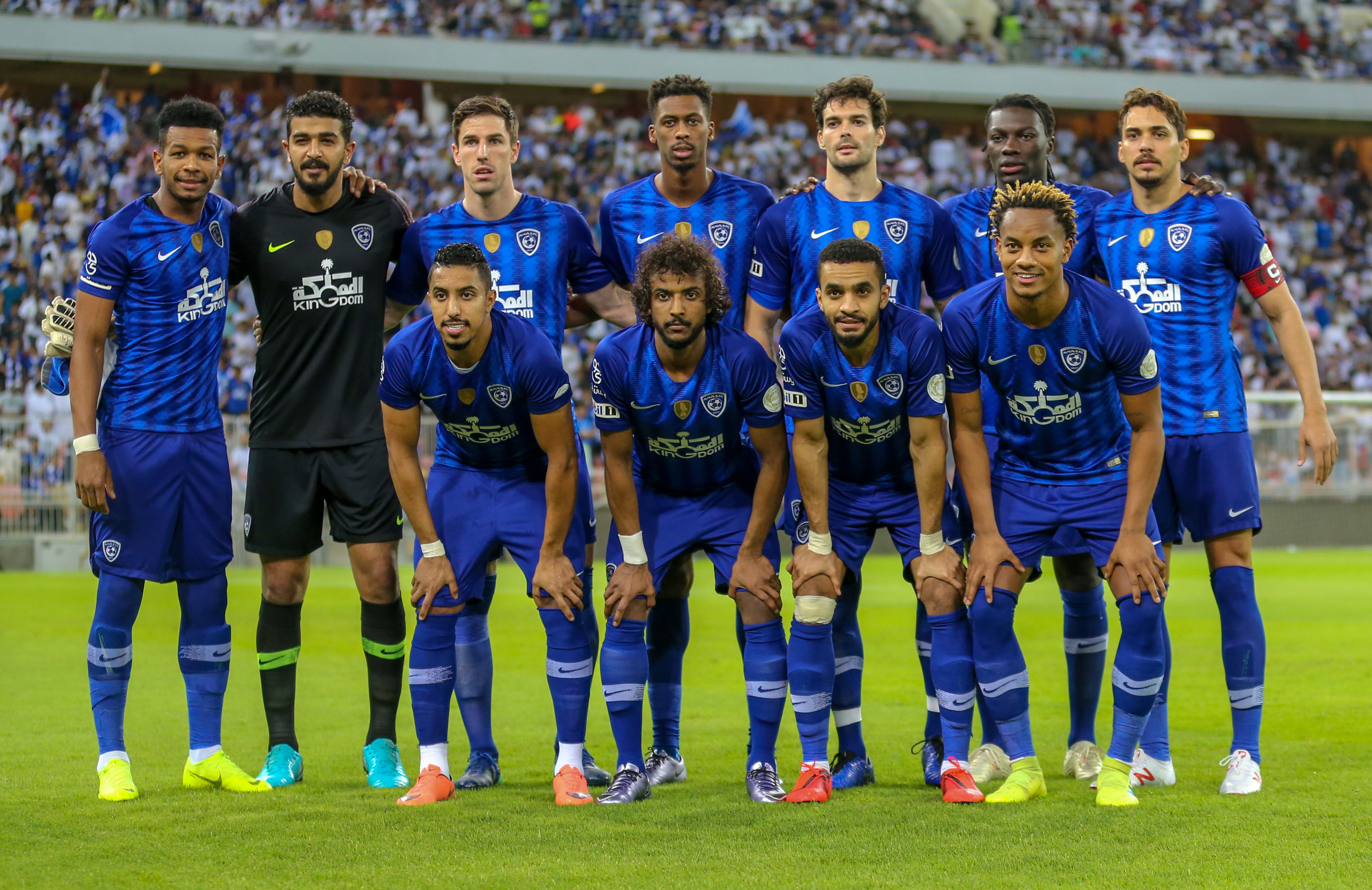
Al Hilal starting XI in 2019

The 2018–19 season saw drastic changes to the league with an increase in the number of clubs from 14 to 16, as well as the increase of foreign players to 8. This season saw the arrival of Bafetimbi Gomis, Andre Carrillo and Sebastian Giovinco managed by Jorge Jesus. The season started very well winning the first nine matches of the league, but when a new president was appointed Jorge Jesus was sacked on 30 January with no specified reason even though he had won 20 matches, was leading the league by 9 points and had won the 2018 Super Cup. Things started to go downhill from there, by the end of the season Al Hilal ended up as runner-up in the league by one point to Al-Nassr and runner-up in the 2018–19 Arab Club Champions Cup, lost out to Al-Taawoun in the semi-final of the 2019 King Cup. Mohammed bin Faisal resigned as president on the 1st of May before the season ended.

Fahad bin Nafil was elected president for a four-year term. Răzvan Lucescu was appointed as the new manager, several players that were deemed unneeded were released. South Korean defender Jang Hyun-soo was signed alongside Colombian international Gustavo Cuéllar. The 2019–2020 season started well and Al Hilal was leading the table almost the whole season with Al Nassr being the only other club in the title race with Al Hilal, nearing final rounds of the season Al Hilal thrashed Al Nassr 4–1 to end their title hopes as we'll finishing the season as champions and setting a new points record of 72. During the 2019 Champions League campaign Al Hilal produced a dominating and exciting performance in the competition to reach the final midway through the season. The first Champions league match of the season was against Al Ahli in the round of 16 Al Hilal won 4–1 away With Gomis scoring a hattrick, and lost 0–1 at home, Al Hilal qualified to the next stage with an aggregate score of 4–2. The quarter final matched Al Hilal against local rivals Al-Ittihad, the first match ended in a 0–0 stalemate away while the second match Al Hilal won 3–1 at home with memorable performances from Salem, Carrillo and Giovinco, Al Hilal qualified to the semi-final with an aggregate score of 3–1. In the semi-final Al Hilal was against their toughest opponent in the competition Al Sadd, in the away match Al Hilal won 4–1 in Doha while the opposing team player Abdulkarim Hassan was sent off. In the return leg at home in Riyadh, Al Sadd was able to turn around the score by scoring four goals to two, and in the last minute of the game they were awarded a free kick at the edge of the box and needed to score one more goal to go through to the final, but Abdullah Al-Mayouf saved the ball and the original time finished with Al Hilal winning 6–5 on aggregate, Al Hilal qualified to their third final in 5 years. After trying and failing to win on two previous finals in 2014 and 2017. They played against the Japanese club Urawa Red Diamonds, to whom they lost to in the final two years before. They successfully took a revenge and won 3–0 on aggregate 1–0 at home and 2–0 away, ending a nineteen-year wait for the Asian crown, Bafetimbi Gomis was also the tournaments top scorer and MVP. With both the 2019–20 Saudi Professional League as well as the 2019 AFC Champions League titles secured Al Hilal had one more title to win to wrap up the treble. Al Hilal reached the 2019–20 King Cup final to face Al Nassr who had not won the cup since 1990, Al Hilal won by 2–1 to complete the historic Treble.

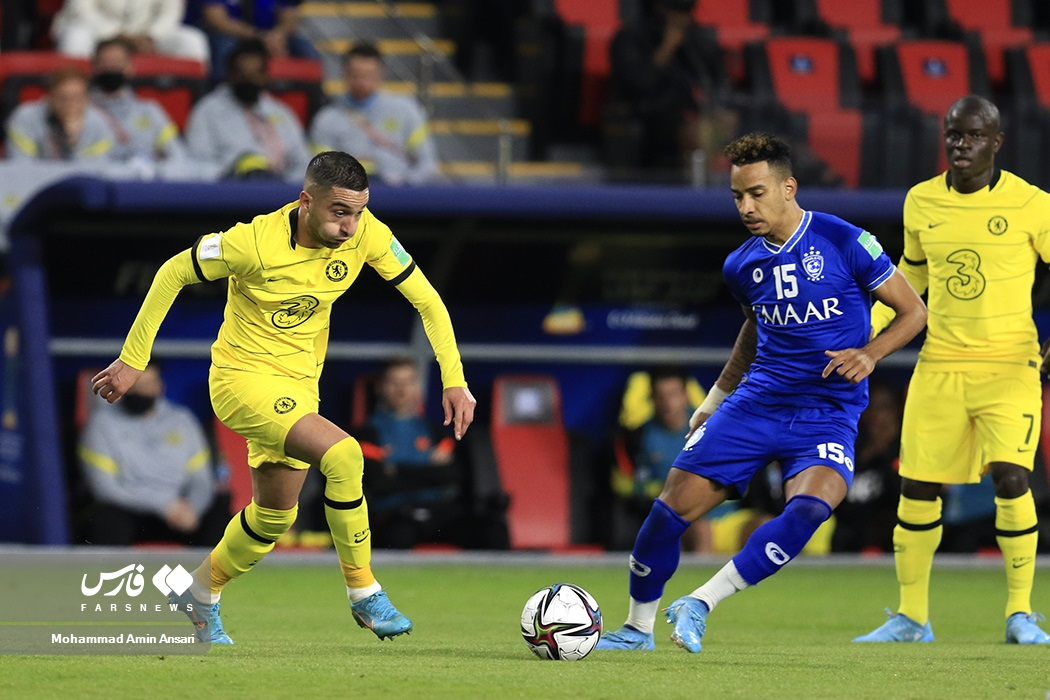
Al Hilal facing against Chelsea on 9 February 2022 in the 2021 FIFA Club World Cup

In the 2021 AFC Champions league, Al Hilal had barely managed to qualify to the knockout stages of the competition. In the round of 16 They faced Iranian team Esteghlal in Dubai and won the match 2–0, in the quarter finals they faced another Iranian team Persepolis whom they defeated 3–0 to qualify to the next stage. In the semi-final stage Al Hilal came up against their perennial rivals Al Nassr which was dubbed as the match of the century due to the long-standing animosity these historic rivals had for each other. This was the first time both teams would face each other in this competition, Further more Al Nassr had never won the AFC Champions league before and Al Hilal needed one more title to be the AFC Champions league outright record title holders. The stakes of the game were so high that the tension was felt in the city of Riyadh weeks before the game. The game finished with Al Hilal winning 2–1 against Al Nassr to reach the final in addition to bragging rights for many years to come. Al Hilal reached the final in 2021 to face South Korean club Pohang Steelers, both clubs had held a record of three AFC Champions League titles. Al Hilal came up on top to score the first goal 16 seconds after the match began. In the end a 2–0 win secured the fourth Asian champions league title, and Al Hilal became the AFC Champions League unequivocal record title holders.

As the champions of the AFC Champions League, Al Hilal qualified for the 2021 FIFA Club World Cup in the UAE, Al Hilal in their first match faced hosts Al Jazira and managed to win 6–1. Al Hilal later faced UEFA Champions League winners Chelsea but lost 1–0, Al Hilal ended up in the 4th position overall in the tournament.

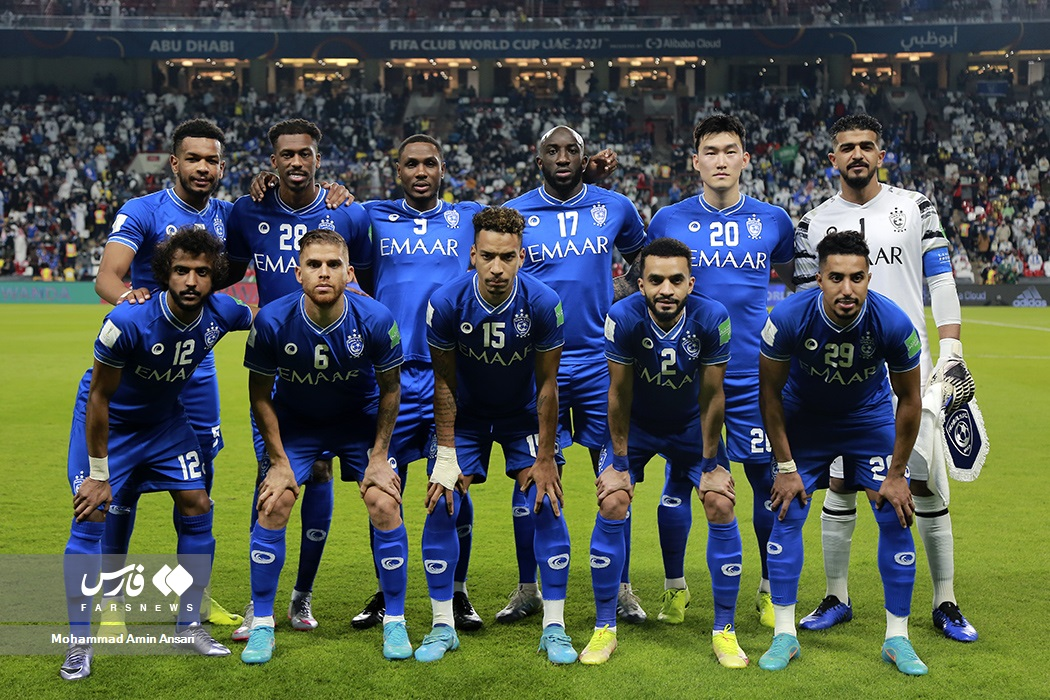
Al Hilal starting XI to face Chelsea on 9 February 2022

In September 2022, Al Hilal offered Cristiano Ronaldo a two-year contract worth €242 million. However, Ronaldo rejected the proposal, calling it "obscene". The reports of the offer first surfaced in July 2022, but the Saudi club name was not known. The President of the Saudi Arabian Football Federation, Yasser Al Misehal said he would like to see Ronaldo play in Saudi, but that it "won't happen before January unfortunately". However, he signed up for rivals Al Nassr instead on 1 January 2023.

In February 2023, Al Hilal played in the 2022 FIFA Club World Cup and reached the final after victories against Wydad Casablanca (2021–22 CAF Champions League Champions) and Flamengo (2022 Copa Libertadores Champions). In the final, Al Hilal faced Europe giants Real Madrid (Champions of the 2021–22 UEFA Champions League) and lost 5–3, becoming the runners up in the 2022 FIFA Club World Cup.

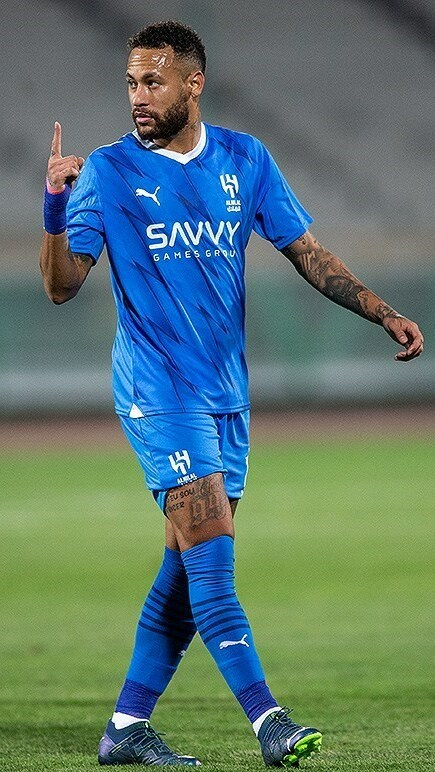
World renowned footballer Neymar playing for Al Hilal in 2023

In the 2022 AFC Champions League campaign, Al Hilal topped Group A to advance to the Round of 16. The Asian Football Confederation decided to change the competition schedule from an all-year-round (spring-to-autumn) schedule to an autumn-to-spring schedule from next season onwards, despite the 2022 season actually being held from April 2022 to May 2023. Due to this decision Al Hilal had 9-month hiatus from the end of the group stage to the first knockout game, in February 2023 Al Hilal faced Emarati Shabab Al Ahli in the round of 16 whom they defeated 3–1. Three days later in the quarter finals Al Hilal faced Iran's Foolad in a highly physical match that ended in a 1–0 win with Marega scoring a goal in 87th minute. After advancing to the semi-final stage Al Hilal was pitted against Qatari Al Duhail, some pundits claimed before the game was played that Al-Duhail would easily reach the final in particular Nashat Akram who claimed that the match was over before it started and that Al-Duhail already booked their place in the final. On the day of the game the match started with Al Hilal scoring four goals in the first 30 minutes and adding a fifth before the first half was over. In the second half Al Hilal capped off the game with two more goals with Odion Ighalo scoring a super hat-trick in a 7–0 decimating win to seal the place in the 2022 AFC Champions League Final Against Urawa Red Diamonds, however, Al Hilal lost and became the runner-ups.

On 15 August 2023, Al Hilal signed world renowned player Neymar for a record breaking Saudi Pro League transfer fee of 90 million euros plus add-ons. Al Hilal also went on to sign more European league players, including Kalidou Koulibaly, Rúben Neves, Sergej Milinković-Savić, Malcom, Yassine Bounou and Aleksandar Mitrović. Later throughout the season, Neymar suffered an ACL injury thus seeing the club signing Renan Lodi under the foreign quota slot. On 11 April 2024, Al Hilal won the 2023 Saudi Super Cup.

== Crest ==
Al Hilal SFC Logo(before 2022)

In 2022, Al Hilal Football Club introduced a major redesign of their logo, signaling a shift from their previous emblem to a more modern and simplified design. The old crest was characterized by a detailed and intricate 3D effect, featuring a gradient ball encased within a crescent moon. This emblem also included the full text of the club's name, "Al Hilal," and the year of its founding, adding layers of historical context and a classic aesthetic to the crest.

The previous design was more detailed and included the founding year while the new logo adopts a more streamlined and contemporary approach. The redesigned logo is limited to a blue and white color scheme, which helps in creating a cleaner and more distinctive visual identity.

Central to the new design are three vertical blue stripes that run parallel to each other. These stripes are interspersed with crescent moons, which are a nod to the club's historical symbol. The new logo uses negative space between the stripes. This design choice creates a white 'H,' representing 'Hilal,' the Arabic word for 'crescent' and the name of the club. Additionally, the negative space also forms a subtle 'S,' which stands for 'Saudi,' linking the emblem to the country of the club's origin.

"The merging of the two letters in both languages in the logo is to symbolize the form of a grand and solid shield suitable for all sports, and bearing the values and principals of Al-Hilal", the Al-Hilal club said officially in August 2022.

== Mascot ==
The club mascot is a shark.

"The merging of the two letters in both languages in the logo is to symbolize the form of a grand and solid shield suitable for all sports, and bearing the values and principals of Al-Hilal", Al-Hilal club said officially in August 2022.

== Grounds ==
Al Hilal currently plays their home games at Kingdom Arena, a modern, multi-purpose stadium located in Riyadh, Saudi Arabia. Inaugurated in 2024, Designed with a seating capacity of approximately 28,000 spectators, Kingdom Arena hosts a variety of events including football matches, concerts, and entertainment shows.

== Rivalries ==
The club has a long-standing rivalry with their neighbors Al Nassr, which is called Riyadh's Derby. They have met 179 times, Al Hilal has won 72 times, lost 61 times, and 45 games have ended in a draw. The biggest win is for Al Hilal when they defeated Al Nassr 5–1 in Saudi Professional League 2016–2017. The rivalry with Al Nassr is more intense between them than the rivalry with Al Ittihad. As an example, when Al Hilal reached the 2014 AFC Champions League Final, in 2nd leg Al Nassr fans awaited Western Sydney Wanderers arrival at the airport to spur them on against Al Hilal and tried to sabotage Al Hilal's ticket plan.

Al Hilal has a rivalry with Al-Ittihad. From the start of national competition the clubs were seen as representatives of the two biggest cities in Saudi Arabia: Riyadh and Jeddah. While Al Hilal have won four Asian Club Championship in years 1991, 1999–2000, 2019 and 2021, Al-Ittihad has won AFC Champions League two times in a row, in 2004 and 2005. Al Hilal won the Saudi El Clasico 62 times, Al-Ittihad won it 50 times, and two sides have drawn 35 times. As of 2023, the biggest win was when Al Hilal defeated Al Ittihad 5–0 in 2009–10.

In the AFC Champions League, Al Hilal has developed notable regional rivalries. Within the GCC region, their matches against Al Ain from the UAE and Al Sadd of Qatar are highly competitive. On the continental stage, fixtures against Iranian sides Persepolis and Esteghlal also carry high stakes, while their matches with East Asian teams Urawa Red Diamonds and Pohang Steelers represent key matchups against some of the tournament's most successful teams.

== Finance and sponsorship ==
=== Sponsorship ===
Period	Kit manufacturer	Kit main sponsor
2004–2006	Adidas	None
2006–2007	Adidas	STC
2007–2013	Adidas	Mobily
2013–2017	Nike	Mobily
2017–2019	Nike	Kingdom Holdings
2019–2022	Mouj	Emaar
2022–2023	Mouj	Jahez / Blu Store
2023–2026	Puma	Savvy Games Group (Note: owned by Public Investment Fund)
2026–present	Puma	National Housing Company (Note: owned by Ministry of Municipalities and Housing)

=== Television match broadcasting rights ===
Al Hilal receives a certain amount from the Saudi Arabia Football Federation as the federation sells the complete matches' right in one package and all the clubs in the Saudi Professional League share the revenue equally. The Saudi league broadcasting rights currently were sold to Saudi Broadcasting Authority's SBC Channel, as well as Shahid streaming service. Also SSC sports (Saudi sports company) has broadcasting rights

=== Other income sources ===
The club's president and other board members secure any extra income required to run the club from merchandising of the club's kit and other products as well as establishing an investment company owned by the club to increase the club's revenue. Sponsorships have been instrumental to the club's finances due to the numerous lucrative deals signed by the club, as the club's huge popularity and appeal locally, regionally and continentally generates a huge number of supporters and admirers, especially on social media; the club has over 15m followers across all social media accounts.

== Club facilities ==
In 2009, the club opened a new camp in Riyadh. It contains 25 rooms, meeting rooms, smart room for lectures, library, eating room, living rooms, a big salon and a medical clinic. It also has entertainment corners for video games, table tennis, billiards, table football and many others. There are two training fields for the senior team.

== Players ==
As of 3 September 2026

Note: Flags indicate national team as defined under FIFA eligibility rules; some limited exceptions apply. Players may hold more than one non-FIFA nationality.

No.	Pos.	Nation	Player
2	DF	KSA	Mohammed Mahzari
3	DF	SEN	Kalidou Koulibaly
4	DF	TUR	Yusuf Akçiçek
6	MF	KSA	Nasser Al-Dawsari
7	FW	BRA	Gabriel Martinelli
8	MF	POR	Rúben Neves
11	FW	ENG	Ollie Watkins
17	GK	KSA	Mohammed Al-Rubaie
18	MF	KSA	Murad Hawsawi
19	DF	FRA	Théo Hernandez
22	MF	SRB	Sergej Milinković-Savić
24	DF	KSA	Moteb Al-Harbi
27	MF	KSA	Sultan Mandash
28	MF	KSA	Mohamed Kanno (vice-captain)
29	FW	KSA	Salem Al-Dawsari (captain)
33	GK	KSA	Mohammed Al-Owais

No.	Pos.	Nation	Player
35	GK	KSA	Rayan Al-Dossary
37	GK	MAR	Yassine Bounou
38	FW	NED	Crysencio Summerville
44	DF	KSA	Saad Al-Mutairi
55	DF	KSA	Mishal Al-Dawood
70	MF	FRA	Saïmon Bouabré
72	MF	KSA	Sabri Dahal
73	DF	KSA	Mohammed Al-Sarnoukh
75	FW	CIV	Mohamed Kader Meïté
77	FW	KSA	Nawaf Al-Habashi
78	DF	KSA	Ali Lajami
87	DF	KSA	Hassan Al-Tambakti
88	DF	KSA	Hamad Al-Yami
93	MF	KSA	Abdullah Al-Anazi
96	MF	KSA	Suhayb Al-Zaid

=== Out on loan ===
Note: Flags indicate national team as defined under FIFA eligibility rules; some limited exceptions apply. Players may hold more than one non-FIFA nationality.

No.	Pos.	Nation	Player
14	MF	KSA	Abdulkarim Darisi (at Abha)
31	DF	KSA	Rayan Al-Ghamdi (at Al-Najma)
32	MF	KSA	Abdullah Al-Zaid (at Al-Diriyah)

No.	Pos.	Nation	Player
—	MF	BRA	Kaio César (at Corinthians)
—	FW	URU	Darwin Núñez (at Al-Diriyah)

== Personnel ==
=== Coaching staff ===
Position	Name
Head coach	(Italy) Simone Inzaghi
Assistant coach	(Italy) Massimiliano Farris (Italy) Ferruccio Cerasaro
Fitness coach	(Italy) Fabio Ripert (Italy) Claudio Spicciariello
Technical coach	(Italy) Sebastiano Siviglia
Rehab coach	(Portugal) Nuno Romano
Match analyst	(Italy) Enrico Allavena (Saudi Arabia) Abdulaziz Al-Dawsari
Interpreter	(Egypt) Mohamed Madani

=== Management ===
Post	Name
President	Prince Nawaf bin saad
Vice President	Suliman alhatlan
Board Member	Abdulmajeed Alhagbani
Chief Executive Officer	Esteve Calzada
Secretary General	Sami Abu Khudair
Sporting Director	Richard Hughes
Technical Director	Simon Francis
Treasurer	Thamer Al-Tassan
Director of Fans Supplies	Rashid Al-Anzan
Director of Legal Affairs	Thamer Al-Jasser
Director of Facilities Development and Maintenance	Badr Al-Mayouf
Director of Other Sports	Ibraheem Al-Youssef
Director of Investments Area	Abdullah Abdul-Jabbar
Director of Youth Football	Abdullateef Al-Hosainy
Director of Recruitment	Mark Burchill
Director of Scouting	Craig McKee
Technical Scout	Harry Arter

This is a list of Al Hilal SFC presidents and chairmen from their foundation in 1957.

Name	From	To	Championships (official)
(Saudi Arabia) Abdulrahman Saeed	1957	1965	3
(Saudi Arabia) Abdulrahman Al-Hamdan	1965	1966	×
(Saudi Arabia) Abdulrahman Saeed	1966	1970	×
(Saudi Arabia) Faisal Al-Shehail	1970	1972	×
(Saudi Arabia) Abdullah Nasser	1972	1976	×
(Saudi Arabia) Hazloul bin Abdulaziz Al Saud	1976	1978	1
(Saudi Arabia) Abdullah Nasser	1978	1982	2
(Saudi Arabia) Hazloul bin Abdulaziz Al Saud	1982	1983	1
(Saudi Arabia) Abdullah Saad	1983	1990	9
(Saudi Arabia) Abdulrahman Saeed	1990	1992	1
(Saudi Arabia) Mohammad Mufti	1992	1993	1
(Saudi Arabia) Abdullah Saeed	1993	1994	×
(Saudi Arabia) Khalid Mohammad	1994	1996	4
(Saudi Arabia) Bandar Mohammad	1997	2000	9
(Saudi Arabia) Saud Turki	2000	2003	6
(Saudi Arabia) Abdullah Musa'ad	2003	2004	1
(Saudi Arabia) Mohammad Faisal	2004	2008	7
(Saudi Arabia) Abdulrahman Musa'ad	2008	2015	7
(Saudi Arabia) Mohammad Al-Homaidani (caretaker)	2015	2015	1
(Saudi Arabia) Nawaf Saad	2015	2018	4
(Saudi Arabia) Sami Al-Jaber	2018		1
(Saudi Arabia) Mohammad Faisal	2018	2019	×
(Saudi Arabia) Abdullah Al-Jarbou (caretaker)	2019		×
(Saudi Arabia) Fahad Nafil Al-Otaibi	2019	Present	12

== Honours ==
Al Hilal SFC honours
Type	Competition	Titles	Seasons
Domestic	Saudi Premier League / Pro League	21	1961-62, 1964-65,1976–77, 1978–79, 1984–85, 1985–86, 1987–88, 1989–90, 1995–96, 1997–98, 2001–02, 2004–05, 2007–08, 2009–10, 2010–11, 2016–17, 2017–18, 2019–20, 2020–21, 2021–22, 2023–24
Domestic	King's Cup	10	1980, 1982, 1984, 1989, 2015, 2017, 2019–20, 2022–23, 2023–24, 2025–26
Domestic	Saudi Super Cup	5	2015, 2018, 2021, 2023, 2024
Domestic	Crown Prince Cup	13	1963–64, 1994–95, 1999–00, 2003, 2004–05, 2005–06, 2007–08, 2008–09, 2009–10, 2010–11, 2011–12, 2012–13, 2015–16
Domestic	Federation Cup	7	1986–87, 1989–90, 1992–93, 1995–96, 1999–2000, 2004–05, 2005–06
Domestic	Founder's Cup	1	1999–2000
Continental	Asian Club Championship / AFC Champions League	4	1991, 2000, 2019, 2021
Continental	Asian Cup Winners' Cup	2^{s}	1997, 2002
Continental	Asian Super Cup	2^{s}	1997, 2000
Regional (GCC Region)	Gulf Club Champions Cup	2	1986, 1998
Regional (Arab Region)	Arab Club Champions Cup	2	1996, 1997
Regional (Arab Region)	Arab Cup Winners' Cup	1	2000
Regional (Arab Region)	Arab Super Cup	1	2001
Worldwide	FIFA Club World Cup	–	–

- record
- ^{S} shared record

== Recent seasons ==
The table below chronicles the achievements of Al Hilal in various competitions since 1999.

=== Key ===
- Pld = Games played
- W = Games won
- D = Games drawn
- L = Games lost
- GF = Goals for
- GA = Goals against
- Pts = Points
- Pos = Final position
- W = Champion
- RU = Final (Runner-up)
- SF = Semi-finals
- QF = Quarter-finals
- R16/R32 = Round of 16, round of 32, etc.
- GS = Group stage
- QS = Qualifying stage

Champions	Runners-up	3rd Place, 4th Place or Losing semi-finalists

Season	Division	Pld	W	D	L	GF	GA	Pts	Pos	King Cup	Crown Prince Cup	Competition	Result	Competition	Result
Season	League									King Cup	Crown Prince Cup	AFC Competitions		Other	
1999–2000	Premier League	22	11	6	5	39	19	39	5th	Not held	W	Asian Club Championship	W	Federation Cup GCC Champions League Founder's Cup	W RU W
2000–01	Premier League	22	14	5	3	36	16	44	4th	Not held	SF	Asian Super Cup Asian Club Championship	W QF	Federation Cup Arab Cup Winners' Cup Arab Super Cup Saudi-Egyptian Super Cup	QS W W W
2001–02	Premier League	22	14	7	1	54	17	49	1st	Not held	R16	Asian Cup Winners Cup	W	Federation Cup Arab Cup Winners' Cup	RU SF
2002–03	Premier League	22	11	8	3	28	18	41	5th	Not held	W	Asian Super Cup AFC Champions League	RU GS	Federation Cup GCC Champions League	QS 3rd
2003–04	Premier League	22	12	4	6	40	18	40	4th	Not held	SF	AFC Champions League	GS	Federation Cup Arab Champions League	RU 4th
2004–05	Premier League	22	13	6	3	41	21	45	1st	Not held	W	—	—	Federation Cup Arab Champions League	W 3rd
2005–06	Premier League	22	13	5	4	41	21	44	2nd	Not held	W	AFC Champions League	GS	Federation Cup	W
2006–07	Premier League	22	17	2	3	38	15	53	2nd	Not held	SF	AFC Champions League	QF	Federation Cup GCC Champions League	QS QS
2007–08	Premier League	22	14	6	2	36	13	48	1st	SF	W	—		Federation Cup GCC Champions League	RU SF
2008–09	Pro League	22	15	5	2	41	9	50	2nd	SF	W	—		Federation Cup	SF
2009–10	Pro League	22	18	2	2	56	18	56	1st	RU	W	AFC Champions League	R16	Federation Cup	RU
2010–11	Pro League	26	19	7	0	52	18	64	1st	SF	W	AFC Champions League	SF	—	
2011–12	Pro League	26	18	6	2	58	22	60	3rd	SF	W	AFC Champions League	R16	—	
2012–13	Pro League	26	17	5	4	62	26	56	2nd	QF	W	AFC Champions League	QF	—	
2013–14	Pro League	26	20	3	3	60	24	63	2nd	QF	RU	AFC Champions League	R16	—	
2014–15	Pro League	26	16	6	4	46	17	54	3rd	W	RU	AFC Champions League	RU	—	
2015–16	Pro League	26	17	4	5	52	23	55	2nd	SF	W	AFC Champions League	SF	Saudi Super Cup	W
2016–17	Pro League	26	21	3	2	63	16	66	1st	W	SF	AFC Champions League	R16	Saudi Super Cup Arab Club Championship	RU GS
2017–18	Pro League	26	16	8	2	47	23	56	1st	R16	Not held	AFC Champions League	RU	—	
2018–19	Pro League	30	21	6	3	66	33	69	2nd	SF	Not held	AFC Champions League	GS	Saudi Super Cup Arab Club Champions Cup	W RU
2019–20	Pro League	30	22	6	2	74	26	72	1st	W	Not held	AFC Champions League	W	FIFA Club World Cup	4th
2020–21	Pro League	30	18	7	5	60	27	61	1st	R16	Not held	AFC Champions League	Withdrew (Note: Al-Hilal failed to name the required 13 players and were unable to play their final match of the group stage against Shabab Al-Ahli due to them having only 11 players left with the remaining team members testing positive for COVID-19. They were considered to have withdrawn from the competition, and all previous matches played by them shall be considered "null and void" and would not be considered in determining the final group rankings.)	Saudi Super Cup	RU
2021–22	Pro League	30	20	7	3	63	28	67	1st	RU	Not held	AFC Champions League	W	Saudi Super Cup FIFA Club World Cup	W 4th
2022–23	Pro League	30	17	8	5	54	29	59	3rd	W	Not held	AFC Champions League	RU	Saudi Super Cup FIFA Club World Cup	SF RU
2023–24	Pro League	34	31	2	0	101	23	96	1st	W	Not held	AFC Champions League	SF	Saudi Super Cup	W
2024–25	Pro League	34	23	6	5	95	41	75	2nd	QF	Not held	AFC Champions League	SF	Saudi Super Cup FIFA Club World Cup	W QF

== Records ==
=== Asian record ===
==== Overview ====
As of 25 April 2026

Competition	Pld	W	D	L	GF	GA
AFC Champions League Elite	188	103	46	39	341	183
Asian Club Championship	41	26	8	7	72	34
Asian Cup Winners' Cup	17	12	3	2	42	9
Asian Super Cup	6	3	2	1	6	4
Total	252	144	59	49	461	'230

==== Record by country ====
Country	Pld	W	D	L	GF	GA	GD	Win%
Australia	2	0	1	1	0	1	−1	0.00
Bangladesh	2	2	0	0	9	1	+8	100.00
China	1	1	0	0	2	1	+1	100.00
India	2	2	0	0	8	0	+8	100.00
Iran	52	25	12	15	72	44	+28	48.08
Iraq	9	8	1	0	22	5	+17	88.89
Japan	11	5	3	3	17	13	+4	45.45
Kazakhstan	2	1	1	0	2	0	+2	50.00
Kuwait	10	5	4	1	17	5	+12	50.00
Lebanon	1	1	0	0	3	1	+2	100.00
North Korea	1	1	0	0	2	0	+2	100.00
Oman	1	1	0	0	5	0	+5	100.00
Palestine	2	2	0	0	7	1	+6	100.00
Qatar	45	26	12	7	93	50	+43	57.78
Saudi Arabia	10	5	1	4	15	13	+2	50.00
South Korea	11	6	1	4	15	9	+6	54.55
South Yemen	2	2	0	0	7	0	+7	100.00
Syria	4	2	2	0	6	4	+2	50.00
Tajikistan	6	5	0	1	13	5	+8	83.33
Thailand	1	1	0	0	4	0	+4	100.00
Turkmenistan	1	1	0	0	4	2	+2	100.00
United Arab Emirates	49	25	14	10	80	55	+25	51.02
Uzbekistan	25	16	6	3	52	18	+34	64.00
Yemen	2	1	1	0	6	2	+4	50.00

==== Matches ====
Season	Competition	Round	Club	Home	Away	Aggregate
1986	Asian Club Championship	2R	(South Yemen) Al-Shorta	2–0	5–0	1st
1986	Asian Club Championship	Final Round	(Japan) Furukawa Electric	3–4		2nd
1986	Asian Club Championship	Final Round	(China) Liaoning	2–1		2nd
1986	Asian Club Championship	Final Round	(Iraq) Al-Talaba	2–1		2nd
1987	Asian Club Championship	Group A	(Iraq) Al-Rasheed	2–1		1st
1987	Asian Club Championship	Group A	(Thailand) Bangkok Bank	4–0		1st
1987	Asian Club Championship	Final	(Japan) Yomiuri	–		Withdrew
1990–91	Asian Cup Winners' Cup	2R	(Bangladesh) Mohammedan	7−0	2–1	9–1
1990–91	Asian Cup Winners' Cup	SF	(Iran) Persepolis	0−0	0−1	0–1
1991	Asian Club Championship	1R	(Kuwait) Al-Jahra	2–0	2–0	4–0
1991	Asian Club Championship	Group B	(North Korea) April 25	2–0		1st
1991	Asian Club Championship	Group B	(Iran) Esteghlal	1–0		1st
1991	Asian Club Championship	SF	(United Arab Emirates) Al-Shabab	1–0		1–0
1991	Asian Club Championship	Final	(Iran) Esteghlal	1–1 (4–3 p)		1–1 (4–3 p)
1996–97	Asian Cup Winners' Cup	1R	(Bahrain) Al-Qadisiya	–		w/o
1996–97	Asian Cup Winners' Cup	2R	(Kuwait) Al-Arabi	6–0	0–1	6–1
1996–97	Asian Cup Winners' Cup	QF	(Oman) Al-Nasr	5–0	–	w/o
1996–97	Asian Cup Winners' Cup	SF	(Iran) Esteghlal	0–0 (5–4 p)		0–0 (5–4 p)
1996–97	Asian Cup Winners' Cup	Final	(Japan) Nagoya Grampus Eight	3–1		3–1
1997	Asian Super Cup	Final	(South Korea) Pohang Steelers	1–0	1–1	2−1
1997–98	Asian Club Championship	2R	(Qatar) Al-Rayyan	3–2	0–0	3–2
1997–98	Asian Club Championship	QF	(Iran) Persepolis	0–1		2nd
1997–98	Asian Club Championship	QF	(Uzbekistan) Navbahor Namangan	3–1		2nd
1997–98	Asian Club Championship	QF	(Lebanon) Al-Ansar	3–1		2nd
1997–98	Asian Club Championship	SF	(South Korea) Pohang Steelers	0–1		0–1
1997–98	Asian Club Championship	Third place	(Iran) Persepolis	4–1		4–1
1998–99	Asian Club Championship	1R	(Kuwait) Al-Salmiya	3–2	0–0	3–2
1998–99	Asian Club Championship	2R	(Yemen) Al-Wehda	4–0	2–2	6–2
1998–99	Asian Club Championship	QF	(Iran) Esteghlal	1–2		3rd
1998–99	Asian Club Championship	QF	(Turkmenistan) Köpetdag Aşgabat	4–2		3rd
1998–99	Asian Club Championship	QF	(United Arab Emirates) Al-Ain	0–1		3rd
1999–2000	Asian Club Championship	2R	(Qatar) Al-Sadd	2–1	1–0	3–1
1999–2000	Asian Club Championship	QF	(Kazakhstan) Irtysh	2–0		1st
1999–2000	Asian Club Championship	QF	(Iraq) Al-Shorta	1–0		1st
1999–2000	Asian Club Championship	QF	(Iran) Persepolis	0–0		1st
1999–2000	Asian Club Championship	SF	(South Korea) Suwon Samsung Bluewings	1–0		1–0
1999–2000	Asian Club Championship	Final	(Japan) Júbilo Iwata	3–2 (asdet)		3–2 (asdet)
2000	Asian Super Cup	Final	(Japan) Shimizu S-Pulse	1–1	2–1	3−2
2000–01	Asian Club Championship	1R	(Syria) Al-Karamah	2–1	0–0	2–1
2000–01	Asian Club Championship	2R	(Kuwait) Al-Salmiya	3–1	0–0	3–1
2000–01	Asian Club Championship	QF	(Kazakhstan) Irtysh	0–0		4th
2000–01	Asian Club Championship	QF	(Saudi Arabia) Al-Ittihad	0–2		4th
2000–01	Asian Club Championship	QF	(Iran) Persepolis	1–3		4th
2001–02	Asian Cup Winners' Cup	1R	(Syria) Tishreen	1–1	3–2	4–3
2001–02	Asian Cup Winners' Cup	2R	(Palestine) Al-Aqsa	5–0	2–1	7–1
2001–02	Asian Cup Winners' Cup	QF	(Tajikistan) Regar-TadAZ Tursunzoda	3–0	2–0	5–0
2001–02	Asian Cup Winners' Cup	SF	(Qatar) Al-Sadd	1–0		1–0
2001–02	Asian Cup Winners' Cup	Final	(South Korea) Jeonbuk Hyundai Motors	2–1 (asdet)		2–1 (asdet)
2002	Asian Super Cup	Final	(South Korea) Suwon Samsung Bluewings	1–0	0–1	1–1 (2–4 p)
2002–03	AFC Champions League	Group C	(United Arab Emirates) Al-Ain	0–1		4th
2002–03	AFC Champions League	Group C	(Iran) Esteghlal	3–2		4th
2002–03	AFC Champions League	Group C	(Qatar) Al-Sadd	1–3		4th
2004	AFC Champions League	Group C	(United Arab Emirates) Sharjah	0–0	2–5	2nd
2004	AFC Champions League	Group C	(Iraq) Al-Shorta	2−0	2−1	2nd
2006	AFC Champions League	Group B	(United Arab Emirates) Al-Ain	2–1	0–2	2nd
2006	AFC Champions League	Group B	(Iraq) Al-Mina'a	3−1	1−1	2nd
2006	AFC Champions League	Group B	(Uzbekistan) Mash'al	5−0	1−2	2nd
2007	AFC Champions League	Group B	Kuwait	1–1	0–0	1st
2007	AFC Champions League	Group B	(Uzbekistan) Pakhtakor	2−0	2−0	1st
2007	AFC Champions League	QF	(United Arab Emirates) Al-Wahda	1−1	0−0	1–1 (a)
2009	AFC Champions League	Group A	(Iran) Saba Qom	1–1	1–0	1st
2009	AFC Champions League	Group A	(Uzbekistan) Pakhtakor	2−0	1−1	1st
2009	AFC Champions League	Group A	(United Arab Emirates) Al-Ahli	2−1	3−1	1st
2009	AFC Champions League	R16	(Qatar) Umm Salal	0–0 (3–4 p)	—N/a	0–0 (3–4 p)
2010	AFC Champions League	Group D	(Qatar) Al-Sadd	0–0	3–0	1st
2010	AFC Champions League	Group D	(Iran) Mes Kerman	3−1	1−3	1st
2010	AFC Champions League	Group D	(United Arab Emirates) Al-Ahli	1−1	3−2	1st
2010	AFC Champions League	R16	(Uzbekistan) Bunyodkor	3–0	—N/a	3–0
2010	AFC Champions League	QF	(Qatar) Al-Gharafa	3–0	2–4	5–4 (a.e.t.)
2010	AFC Champions League	SF	(Iran) Zob Ahan	0–1	0–1	0–2
2011	AFC Champions League	Group A	(Iran) Sepahan	1–2	1–1	2nd
2011	AFC Champions League	Group A	(Qatar) Al-Gharafa	2–0	1–0	2nd
2011	AFC Champions League	Group A	(United Arab Emirates) Al-Jazira	3−1	3–2	2nd
2011	AFC Champions League	R16	(Saudi Arabia) Al-Ittihad	—N/a	1–3	1–3
2012	AFC Champions League	Group D	(Iran) Persepolis	1–1	1–0	1st
2012	AFC Champions League	Group D	(Qatar) Al-Gharafa	2–1	3–3	1st
2012	AFC Champions League	Group D	(United Arab Emirates) Al-Shabab	2−1	1–1	1st
2012	AFC Champions League	R16	(United Arab Emirates) Baniyas	7–1	—N/a	7–1
2012	AFC Champions League	QF	(South Korea) Ulsan Hyundai	0–4	0–1	0–5
2013	AFC Champions League	Group D	(United Arab Emirates) Al-Ain	2–0	1–3	2nd
2013	AFC Champions League	Group D	(Qatar) Al-Rayyan	3–1	2–0	2nd
2013	AFC Champions League	Group D	(Iran) Esteghlal	1–2	1–0	2nd
2013	AFC Champions League	R16	(Qatar) Lekhwiya	0–1	2–2	2–3
2014	AFC Champions League	Group D	(United Arab Emirates) Al-Ahli	2–2	0–0	1st
2014	AFC Champions League	Group D	(Iran) Sepahan	1–0	2–3	1st
2014	AFC Champions League	Group D	(Qatar) Al-Sadd	5–0	2–2	1st
2014	AFC Champions League	R16	(Uzbekistan) Bunyodkor	3–0	1–0	4–0
2014	AFC Champions League	QF	(Qatar) Al-Sadd	1–0	0–0	1–0
2014	AFC Champions League	SF	(United Arab Emirates) Al-Ain	3–0	1–2	4–2
2014	AFC Champions League	Final	(Australia) Western Sydney Wanderers	0–0	0–1	0–1
2015	AFC Champions League	Group C	(Uzbekistan) Lokomotiv Tashkent	3–1	2–1	1st
2015	AFC Champions League	Group C	(Qatar) Al-Sadd	2–1	0–1	1st
2015	AFC Champions League	Group C	(Iran) Foolad	2–0	0–0	1st
2015	AFC Champions League	R16	(Iran) Persepolis	3–0	0–1	3–1
2015	AFC Champions League	QF	(Qatar) Lekhwiya	4–1	2–2	6–3
2015	AFC Champions League	SF	(United Arab Emirates) Al-Ahli	1–1	2–3	3–4
2016	AFC Champions League	Group C	(Uzbekistan) Pakhtakor	4–1	2–2	2nd
2016	AFC Champions League	Group C	(United Arab Emirates) Al-Jazira	1−0	1–1	2nd
2016	AFC Champions League	Group C	(Iran) Tractor Sazi	0−2	2–1	2nd
2016	AFC Champions League	R16	(Uzbekistan) Lokomotiv Tashkent	0–0	1–2	1–2
2017	AFC Champions League	Group D	(Iran) Persepolis	0–0	1–1	1st
2017	AFC Champions League	Group D	(Qatar) Al-Rayyan	2–1	4–3	1st
2017	AFC Champions League	Group D	(United Arab Emirates) Al-Wahda	1–0	2–2	1st
2017	AFC Champions League	R16	(Iran) Esteghlal Khuzestan	2–1	2–1	4–2
2017	AFC Champions League	QF	(United Arab Emirates) Al-Ain	3–0	0–0	3–0
2017	AFC Champions League	SF	(Iran) Persepolis	4–0	2–2	6–2
2017	AFC Champions League	Final	(Japan) Urawa Red Diamonds	1–1	0–1	1–2
2018	AFC Champions League	Group D	(United Arab Emirates) Al-Ain	0–0	1–2	4th
2018	AFC Champions League	Group D	(Iran) Esteghlal	0–1	0–1	4th
2018	AFC Champions League	Group D	(Qatar) Al-Rayyan	1–1	1–2	4th
2019	AFC Champions League	Group C	(United Arab Emirates) Al-Ain	2–0	1–0	1st
2019	AFC Champions League	Group C	(Qatar) Al-Duhail	3–1	2–2	1st
2019	AFC Champions League	Group C	(Iran) Esteghlal	1–0	1–2	1st
2019	AFC Champions League	R16	(Saudi Arabia) Al-Ahli	0–1	4–2	4–3
2019	AFC Champions League	QF	(Saudi Arabia) Al-Ittihad	3–1	0–0	3–1
2019	AFC Champions League	SF	(Qatar) Al-Sadd	2–4	4–1	6–5
2019	AFC Champions League	Final	(Japan) Urawa Red Diamonds	1–0	2–0	3–0
2020	AFC Champions League	Group B	(Iran) Shahr Khodro	2–0	0–0	Withdrew
2020	AFC Champions League	Group B	(United Arab Emirates) Shabab Al-Ahli	—N/a	2–1	Withdrew
2020	AFC Champions League	Group B	(Uzbekistan) Pakhtakor	2–1	0–0	Withdrew
2021	AFC Champions League	Group A	(Uzbekistan) AGMK	2–2	3–0	2nd
2021	AFC Champions League	Group A	(United Arab Emirates) Shabab Al-Ahli	2–0	0–2	2nd
2021	AFC Champions League	Group A	(Tajikistan) Istiklol	3–1	1–4	2nd
2021	AFC Champions League	R16	(Iran) Esteghlal	2–0		2–0
2021	AFC Champions League	QF	(Iran) Persepolis	3–0		3–0
2021	AFC Champions League	SF	(Saudi Arabia) Al-Nassr	2–1		2–1
2021	AFC Champions League	Final	(South Korea) Pohang Steelers	2–0		2–0
2022	AFC Champions League	Group A	(United Arab Emirates) Sharjah	2–1	2–2	1st
2022	AFC Champions League	Group A	(Qatar) Al-Rayyan	0–2	3–0	1st
2022	AFC Champions League	Group A	(Tajikistan) Istiklol	1–0	3–0	1st
2022	AFC Champions League	Round of 16	(United Arab Emirates) Shabab Al Ahli	3–1		3–1
2022	AFC Champions League	QF	(Iran) Foolad	1–0		1–0
2022	AFC Champions League	SF	(Qatar) Al-Duhail	7–0		7–0
2022	AFC Champions League	Final	(Japan) Urawa Red Diamonds	1–1	0–1	1–2
2023–24	AFC Champions League	Group D	(Uzbekistan) Navbahor	1–1	2–0	1st
2023–24	AFC Champions League	Group D	(Iran) Nassaji Mazandaran	2–1	3–0	1st
2023–24	AFC Champions League	Group D	(India) Mumbai City	6–0	2–0	1st
2023–24	AFC Champions League	R16	(Iran) Sepahan	3–1	3–1	6–2
2023–24	AFC Champions League	QF	(Saudi Arabia) Al-Ittihad	2–0	2–0	4–0
2023–24	AFC Champions League	SF	(United Arab Emirates) Al-Ain	2–1	2–4	4–5
2024–25	AFC Champions League Elite	League stage	(Qatar) Al-Rayyan	—N/a	3–1	1st
2024–25	AFC Champions League Elite	League stage	(Iraq) Al-Shorta	5–0	—N/a	1st
2024–25	AFC Champions League Elite	League stage	(United Arab Emirates) Al-Ain	—N/a	5–4	1st
2024–25	AFC Champions League Elite	League stage	(Iran) Esteghlal	3–0	—N/a	1st
2024–25	AFC Champions League Elite	League stage	(Qatar) Al-Sadd	—N/a	1–1	1st
2024–25	AFC Champions League Elite	League stage	(Qatar) Al-Gharafa	3–0	—N/a	1st
2024–25	AFC Champions League Elite	League stage	(Iran) Persepolis	4–1	—N/a	1st
2024–25	AFC Champions League Elite	League stage	(United Arab Emirates) Al-Wasl	—N/a	2–0	1st
2024–25	AFC Champions League Elite	R16	(Uzbekistan) Pakhtakor	4–0	0–1	4–1
2024–25	AFC Champions League Elite	QF	(South Korea) Gwangju	7–0		7–0
2024–25	AFC Champions League Elite	SF	(Saudi Arabia) Al-Ahli	1–3		1–3
2025–26	AFC Champions League Elite	League stage	(Qatar) Al Duhail	2–1	—N/a	1st
2025–26	AFC Champions League Elite	League stage	(Uzbekistan) Nasaf	—N/a	3–2	1st
2025–26	AFC Champions League Elite	League stage	(Qatar) Al-Sadd	3–1	—N/a	1st
2025–26	AFC Champions League Elite	League stage	(Qatar) Al-Gharafa	—N/a	2–1	1st
2025–26	AFC Champions League Elite	League stage	(Iraq) Al-Shorta	4–0	—N/a	1st
2025–26	AFC Champions League Elite	League stage	(United Arab Emirates) Sharjah	—N/a	1–0	1st
2025–26	AFC Champions League Elite	League stage	(United Arab Emirates) Shabab Al Ahli	—N/a	0–0	1st
2025–26	AFC Champions League Elite	League stage	(United Arab Emirates) Al-Wahda	2–1	—N/a	1st
2025–26	AFC Champions League Elite	R16	(Qatar) Al-Sadd	3–3 (2–4 p)		3–3 (2–4 p)

Key: PO – Play-off round; 1R/2R – First/Second round; R16 – Round of 16; QF – Quarter-final; SF – Semi-final;

Notes

Al Qadisiya withdrew.
Al Nasr withdrew at the start of the second half of the 1st leg.
Al Hilal failed to name the required 13 players and were unable to play their final match of the group stage against Shabab Al Ahli due to them having only 11 players left with the remaining team members testing positive for COVID-19. They were considered to have withdrawn from the competition.

==== Top scorers in Asian competitions ====
	Player	Country	Goals
1	Salem Al-Dawsari	Saudi Arabia	35
2	Sami Al-Jaber	Saudi Arabia	23
3	Bafétimbi Gomis	France	20
4	Yasser Al-Qahtani	Saudi Arabia	18
5	Aleksandar Mitrović	Serbia	14
6	Mohammad Al-Shalhoub	Saudi Arabia	13
6	Abdullah Al-Jamaan	Saudi Arabia	13
8	Carlos Eduardo	Brazil	12
9	Nasser Al-Shamrani	Saudi Arabia	11
10	Yousuf Al-Thunayan	Saudi Arabia	10
10	Omar Kharbin	Syria	10

Top scorers of all time in all competitions

Sami Al-Jaber Saudi Arabia 175

Salem Al-Dawsari Saudi Arabia 144

Yasser Al-Qahtani Saudi Arabia 132

Bafetimbi Gomis France 116

Mohammad Al-Shalhoub Saudi Arabia 102

== See also ==
- Al Hilal SFC (women)
- Al Hilal (basketball)
