= Football in Saudi Arabia =

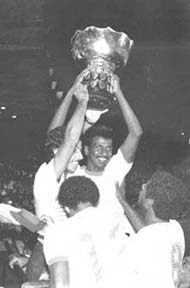
- Majed Abdullah while winning the 1984 AFC Asian Cup.
- Country: Saudi Arabia
- Governing body: SAFF
- National teams: National team Under-23 national team Under-20 national team Under-17 national team Women's national team
- Nicknames: الصقور العربية (as-Suqūr Al-'Arabiyyah, "Arabian Falcons") الصقور الخضر (as-Suqūr al-Khoḍur, "The Green Falcons") الأخضر (al-'Akhḍar, "The Green")
- First played: 1921
- Clubs: 172

National competitions
- FIFA World Cup; AFC Asian Cup; FIFA Arab Cup; WAFF Championship; Arabian Gulf Cup

Club competitions
- List: League: Saudi Pro League Saudi First Division League Saudi Second Division League Saudi Third Division League Saudi Fourth Division League Saudi Women's Premier League Saudi Women's First Division League Saudi Women's Second Division League; Cups: King's Cup Saudi Super Cup SAFF Women's Cup Saudi Women's Super Cup

International competitions
- FIFA Club World Cup; FIFA Intercontinental Cup; AFC Champions League Elite; AFC Champions League Two; AGCFF Gulf Club Champions League; Arab Club Champions Cup

Audience records
- Season: 2025–26 Saudi Pro League

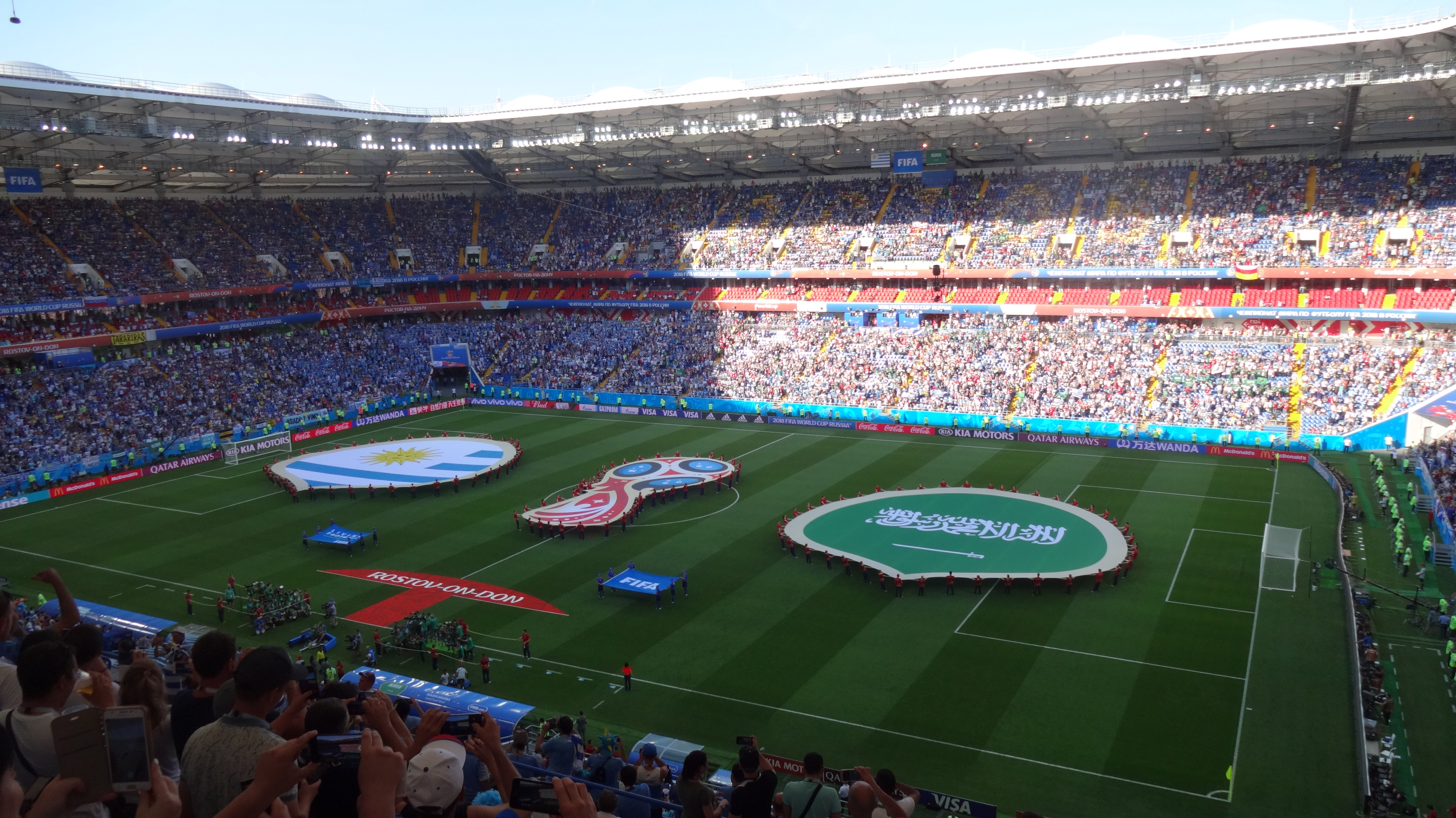
Uruguay-Saudi Arabia match at the 2018 FIFA World Cup in Russia

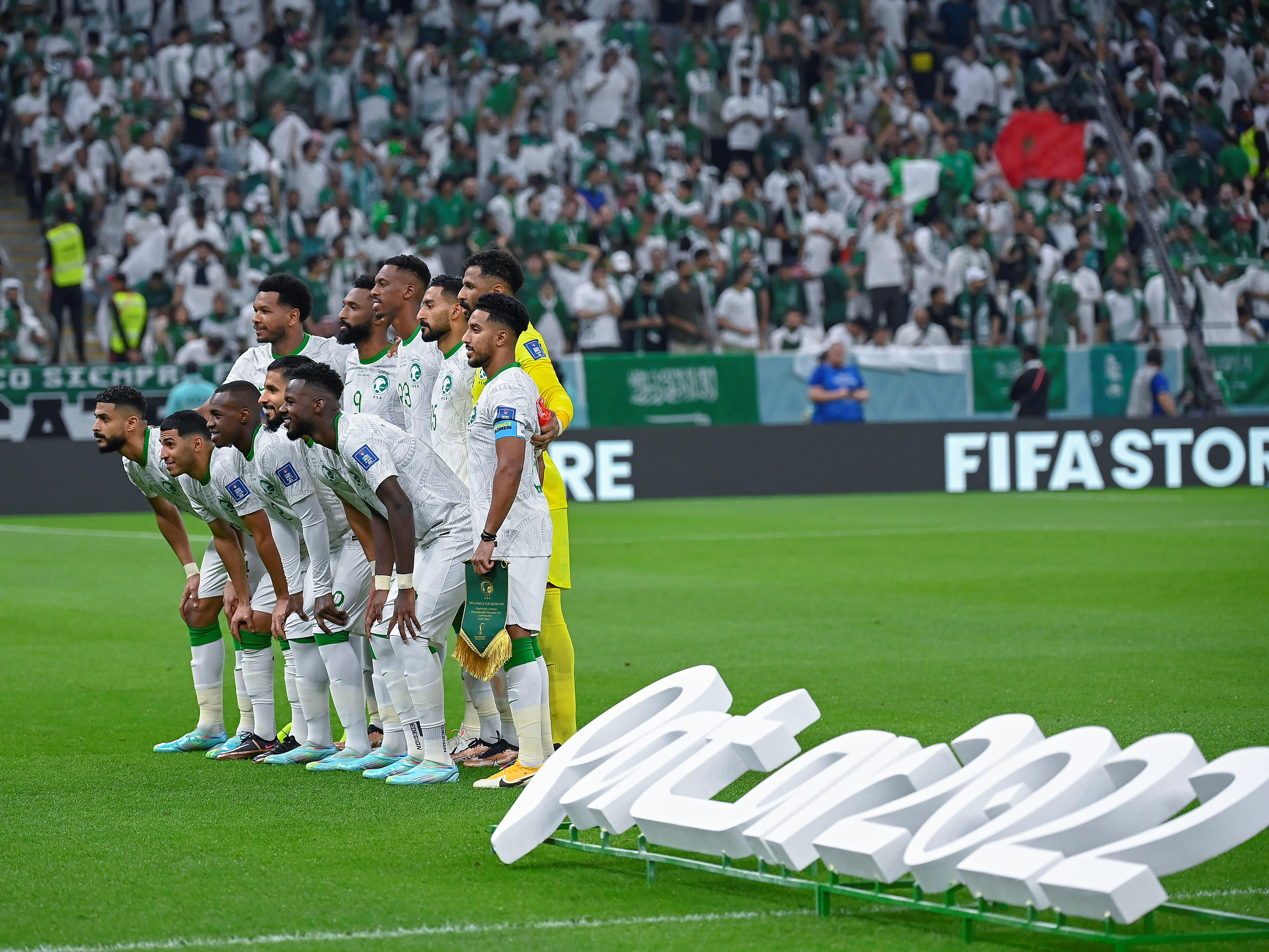
Saudi Men's National Team at the 2022 FIFA World Cup in Qatar. They were the only team to defeat Argentina, that years World Cup champions.

Football is one of the most popular sports in Saudi Arabia. Approximately 50% of the Saudi population is interested in and identify as fans of the sport. Saudi Arabia has been a FIFA member since 1956, after establishing its governing body: the Saudi Arabia Football Federation (SAFF) (Arabic: الاتحاد السعودي لكرة القدم). The SAFF administers the national football teams and the nation's growing club league system.

Saudi Arabia's National Football team first made the 1994 FIFA World Cup, hosted in the United States. Over 30 years later, on December 11, 2024, FIFA announced Saudi Arabia would be the host of the 2034 World Cup. The SAFF prepared the only bid for the tournament's nomination process.

Fandom in Saudi Arabia's league system has increased since the turn of the 21st century. The same period has seen the privatization of once state-owned clubs and the record-breaking signings of international footballers. Both components of Saudi Arabia's sports agenda are national elements in the Saudi Vision 2030 development plan.

== History ==
The first recorded history of football in Saudi Arabia comes from 1902. The first club founded in Saudi Arabia was Al-Ittihad (Jeddah) in 1927. Clubs including Al-Ahli (Jeddah), Al-Ettifaq (Dammam), Al-Shabab (Riyadh), Al-Riyadh (Riyadh), Al-Nassr (Riyadh), and Al-Hilal (Riyadh) were all founded between 1927 and 1957. In 1956, Prince Abdullah bin Faisal al Saud founded the Saudi Arabia Football Federation (SAFF, occasionally shorthanded to SFF), as a central governing body for football in the nation. Ending in a 1–1 draw, the national team played its first match on October 20, 1957, against the Syrian National Football Team in Beirut, Lebanon.

=== National Football Team ===
The Saudi Arabia National Football Team (Arabic: منتخب السعودية لكرة القدم), is nicknamed as Al-Saqour, which means The Falcons. They are one of the most successful football teams in Asia, winning the Asian Championship three times and qualified to the World Cup six times (1994, 1998, 2002, 2006, 2018, and 2022). On October 15, 2025, the team qualified for the 2026 FIFA World Cup, their seventh tournament berth. As of 21 November 2025, Saudi Arabia is placed 60th in the FIFA World Rankings.

=== Rivalries ===
Saudi Arabia has a major rivalry with Iran in football. In the past few decades, Saudi Arabia has also developed rivalries with Qatar and the United Arab Emirates (UAE), two countries in what has been called the "football triangle" of the Middle East. Also, the rivalry between Saudi Arabia and Iraq has recently been re-established, as in 2018 the Falcons traveled to Basra, Iraq to play a club team in a friendly. Weeks later, FIFA, in-part convinced by the SAFF, allowed Iraq to host international matches for the first time since 1990.

=== League ===
The Saudi Pro League is the highest level of competition in the country. until the 1970s, football was organized on a regional basis across Saudi Arabia.

In the 1976 Saudi Professional League season, with the improvement of transportation links and local football, the league was launched on a national basis. Eight clubs participated in the first season of the tournament.

In 1981, a decision was made by the Saudi Arabia Football Federation to increase the number of clubs to 18 clubs, 8 of which take part in the first league, with the other 10 competing in the second league.

In the 1985 season, the number of clubs in the first league was increased to 12.

In 1990, a league cup was introduced, known as The Custodian of the Two Holy Mosques League Cup. It was a two-stage competition, a round-robin and knockout phase. The top four teams (known as the Golden Square) from the round-robin moved to the knock-out phase to compete for the final championship.

In the 2007–08 season, The Custodian of the Two Holy Mosques Champions Cup was introduced for the more elite teams to compete for. Eight teams participate, including the top six teams of the first league, the winner of the Crown Prince Cup, and the Prince Faisal Cup.

The current Saudi Pro League (SPL) was formally organized in 2008. As of 2025, there are 18 teams that compete in Saudi Arabia's top league. Comparisons have been made between SPL and the United States' Major League Soccer (MLS) and China's Chinese Super League (CSL), as they gained popularity and secured investments in the same time period.

Since 2023, the league started growing through the investment of the Public Investment Fund, mainly in association football. World famous football players like Cristiano Ronaldo and Karim Benzema joined the top-flight football league of Saudi Arabia with the help of the Public Investment Fund. Cristiano Ronaldo made an immediate impact on the global following of his club Al-Nassr.

The 2024–25 season broke the Saudi Pro League's attendance record with over 2.5 million fans attending 306 matches.

=== Saudi Vision 2030 ===
In 2016, Saudi Arabia unveiled their future structural development plan, Saudi Vision 2030. The plan's goals are to uncouple state-wealth from non-renewable fuel exports and promote private strategic investment in the state. The government of Saudi Arabia is interested in societal change. One of the ways to get there, according to them, is strategically investing in sport. In 2023, it was announced that there would be US$2 billion invested over five years solely for sports related ventures. In November 2016, the government of Saudi Arabia approved plans to turn state-owned sports clubs into private companies. Some have made the comparison between Saudi Arabia's government and the governments of former World Cup hosts South Korea (2002) and Qatar (2022). The two nations invested heavily in sport prior to hosting the tournament. Saudi Arabia will host the World Cup in 2034. With the investment and improvement of football for Saudi Arabia's main rivals, the UAE and Qatar, arguments have been made that this investment is a push to get even with other Middle East football powerhouses.

== Events hosted ==
- 1972 Arabian Gulf Cup
- 1984 Arab Club Champions Cup
- 1985 Afro-Asian Cup of Nations
- 1985 Arab Cup
- 1985–86 Asian Club Championship
- 1986 AFC Youth Championship
- 1986 Asian Club Championship
- 1987 Arab Club Champions Cup
- 1988 Arabian Gulf Cup
- 1989 Arab Cup Winners' Cup
- 1989 FIFA World Youth Championship
- 1992 AFC U-17 Championship
- 1992 FIFA Confederations Cup
- 1995 Arab Super Cup
- 1995 FIFA Confederations Cup
- 1996 Arab Super Cup
- 1997 Asian Super Cup
- 1997 FIFA Confederations Cup
- 1998 Arab Club Champions Cup
- 1998 Asian Super Cup
- 1999 Asian Super Cup
- 2000 Arab Club Champions Cup
- 2000 Arab Cup Winners' Cup
- 2000 Asian Super Cup
- 2001 Asian Super Cup
- 2002 Arab Unified Club Championship
- 2002 Arabian Gulf Cup
- 2002 Asian Super Cup
- 2005 Islamic Solidarity Games
- 2008 AFC U-19 Championship
- 2008 GCC U-23 Championship
- 2011 Arab Cup U-17
- 2012 Arab Cup
- 2014 AFC Champions League final
- 2014 Arabian Gulf Cup
- 2017 AFC Champions League final
- 2018 Supercoppa Italiana
- 2019 AFC Champions League final
- 2019 Supercoppa Italiana
- 2020 Supercopa de España
- 2020 Arab Cup U-20
- 2021 AFC Champions League final
- 2021 WAFF U-15 Championship
- 2021 WAFF U-23 Championship
- 2022 Supercopa de España
- 2022 Arab Cup U-20
- 2022 Supercoppa Italiana
- 2022 WAFF U-23 Championship
- 2023 Arab Club Champions Cup (Final tournament)
- 2023 FIFA Club World Cup
- 2023 Supercopa de España
- 2023 Supercoppa Italiana
- 2024 WAFF U-23 Championship
- 2024 Supercoppa Italiana
- 2025 Supercopa de España
- 2024–25 AFC Champions League Elite (Final stage)
- 2025 AFC U-17 Asian Cup
- 2025–26 AFC Champions League Elite (Final stage)
- 2026 AFC U-23 Asian Cup
- 2026 Arabian Gulf Cup
- 2027 AFC Asian Cup
- 2034 FIFA World Cup

== National team ==
=== Achievements ===
- 1970 Arabian Gulf Cup – Third place
- 1972 Arabian Gulf Cup – Runner-up
- 1973 AFC Youth Championship – Fourth place
- 1974 Arabian Gulf Cup – Runner-up
- 1976 Pan Arab Games – Silver
- 1979 Arabian Gulf Cup — Third place
- 1982 Asian Games – Bronze
- 1984 Arabian Gulf Cup – Third place
- 1984 AFC Asian Cup – Champion
- 1985 Arab Cup – Third place
- 1985 Pan Arab Games – Fourth place
- 1985 Afro-Asian Cup of Nations – Runner-up
- 1985 AFC Youth Championship – Runner-up
- 1985 AFC U-16 Championship – Champion
- 1986 Arabian Gulf Cup – Third place
- 1986 Asian Games – Silver
- 1986 AFC Youth Championship – Champion
- 1986 AFC U-16 Championship – Third place
- 1988 Arabian Gulf Cup – Third place
- 1988 AFC Asian Cup – Champion
- 1988 AFC U-16 Championship – Champion
- 1989 FIFA U-16 World Championship – Champion
- 1992 Arabian Gulf Cup – Third place
- 1992 AFC Asian Cup – Runner-up
- 1992 FIFA Confederations Cup – Runner-up
- 1992 Arab Cup – Runner-up
- 1992 AFC Youth Championship – Champion
- 1992 AFC U-17 Championship – Third place
- 1994 Arabian Gulf Cup – Champion
- 1996 Arabian Gulf Cup – Third place
- 1996 AFC Asian Cup – Champion
- 1997 Afro-Asian Cup of Nations – Runner-up
- 1998 Arabian Gulf Cup – Runner-up
- 1998 Arab Cup – Champion
- 1998 AFC Youth Championship – Third place
- 1999 FIFA Confederations Cup – Fourth place
- 2000 AFC Asian Cup – Runner-up
- 2002 Arabian Gulf Cup – Champion
- 2002 Arab Cup – Champion
- 2002 AFC Youth Championship – Third place
- 2003‒04 Arabian Gulf Cup – Champion
- 2005 Islamic Solidarity Games – Gold
- 2007 Arabian Gulf Cup – Third place
- 2007 AFC Asian Cup – Runner-up
- 2007 Pan Arab Games – Bronze
- 2008 GCC U-23 Championship – Champion
- 2009 Arabian Gulf Cup – Runner-up
- 2010 Arabian Gulf Cup – Runner-up
- 2010 AFC U-19 Championship – Fourth place
- 2011 GCC U-23 Championship – Third place
- 2011 Arab Cup U-20 – Runner-up
- 2011 Arab Cup U-17 – Champion
- 2012 Arab Cup U-20 – Runner-up
- 2012 Arab Cup – Fourth place
- 2012 GCC U-23 Championship – Champion
- 2013 AFC U-22 Championship – Runner-up
- 2013 GCC U-23 Championship – Runner-up
- 2013 Islamic Solidarity Games – Fourth place
- 2014 Arabian Gulf Cup – Runner-up
- 2014 Arab Cup U-17 – Runner-up
- 2015 GCC U-23 Championship – Champion
- 2015 GCC U-19 Championship – Fourth place
- 2016 GCC U-23 Championship – Champion
- 2016 AFC U-19 Championship – Runner-up
- 2016 GCC U-19 Championship – Champion
- 2018 AFC U-19 Championship – Champion
- 2019 Arabian Gulf Cup – Runner-up
- 2020 AFC U-23 Championship – Runner-up
- 2021 Arab Cup U-20 – Champion
- 2021 Islamic Solidarity Games – Runner-up
- 2022 AFC U-23 Asian Cup – Champion
- 2022 Arab Cup U-20 – Champion
- 2022 WAFF U-23 Championship – Champion
- 2023 Arab Games U-23 – Gold medal

== Leagues of Saudi Arabia ==
As of 2025

Leagues – Men

- Saudi Pro League
- Saudi First Division League
- Saudi Second Division League
- Saudi Third Division League
- Saudi Fourth Division League
- Saudi Reserve league (defunct)

Leagues – Youth

- Youth – Premier Division League U-19
- Youth – First Division League U-19
- Youngster – Premier Division League U-17
- Youngster – First Division League U-17
- Youngster – Premier Division League U-15
- Youngster – First Division League U-15
- Youngster – Premier Division League U-13
- Youngster – First Division League U-13

Leagues – Women

- Saudi Women's Premier League
- Saudi Women's First Division League
- Saudi Women's Second Division League
- SAFF Women's National Football Championship (defunct)
- Women's Community Football League (defunct)
- Saudi Women's U-17 Tournament

Cups – Men

- King's Cup
- Saudi Super Cup
- Crown Prince's Cup (defunct)
- Saudi Federation Cup (defunct)
- Saudi Founder's Cup (held every 100 years)

Cups – Women

- SAFF Women's Cup
- Saudi Women's Super Cup

Other - Men

- Saudi Beach Soccer Premier League
- Saudi Futsal Premier League
- Saudi Futsal First Division League
- SAFF Futsal Cup
- Saudi Futsal Super Cup

Other - Women

- Saudi Women's Futsal Tournament

== List of the men Top League champions ==
No	Season	Champion	Runners up
Saudi Categorization League
C	1974–75	Al-Nassr	Al-Hilal
Saudi Premier League
–	1975–76	Canceled	
1	1976–77	Al-Hilal	Al-Nassr
2	1977–78	Al-Ahli	Al-Nassr
3	1978–79	Al-Hilal	Al-Nassr
4	1979–80	Al-Nassr	Al-Hilal
5	1980–81	Al-Nassr	Al-Hilal
6	1981–82	Al-Ittihad	Al-Shabab
7	1982–83	Al-Ettifaq	Al-Hilal
8	1983–84	Al-Ahli	Al-Ittihad
9	1984–85	Al-Hilal	Al-Shabab
10	1985–86	Al-Hilal	Al-Ittihad
11	1986–87	Al-Ettifaq	Al-Hilal
12	1987–88	Al-Hilal	Al-Ettifaq
13	1988–89	Al-Nassr	Al-Shabab
14	1989–90	Al-Hilal	Al-Ahli
15	1990–91	Al-Shabab	Al-Nassr
16	1991–92	Al-Shabab	Al-Ettifaq
17	1992–93	Al-Shabab	Al-Hilal
18	1993–94	Al-Nassr	Al-Riyadh
19	1994–95	Al-Nassr	Al-Hilal
20	1995–96	Al-Hilal	Al-Ahli
21	1996–97	Al-Ittihad	Al-Hilal
22	1997–98	Al-Hilal	Al-Shabab
23	1998–99	Al-Ittihad	Al-Ahli
24	1999–00	Al-Ittihad	Al-Ahli
25	2000–01	Al-Ittihad	Al-Nassr
26	2001–02	Al-Hilal	Al-Ittihad
27	2002–03	Al-Ittihad	Al-Ahli
28	2003–04	Al-Shabab	Al-Ittihad
29	2004–05	Al-Hilal	Al-Shabab
30	2005–06	Al-Shabab	Al-Hilal
31	2006–07	Al-Ittihad	Al-Hilal
32	2007–08	Al-Hilal	Al-Ittihad
Saudi Pro League
33	2008–09	Al-Ittihad	Al-Hilal
34	2009–10	Al-Hilal	Al-Ittihad
35	2010–11	Al-Hilal	Al-Ittihad
36	2011–12	Al-Shabab	Al-Ahli
37	2012–13	Al-Fateh	Al-Hilal
38	2013–14	Al-Nassr	Al-Hilal
39	2014–15	Al-Nassr	Al-Ahli
40	2015–16	Al-Ahli	Al-Hilal
41	2016–17	Al-Hilal	Al-Ahli
42	2017–18	Al-Hilal	Al-Ahli
43	2018–19	Al-Nassr	Al-Hilal
44	2019–20	Al-Hilal	Al-Nassr
45	2020–21	Al-Hilal	Al-Shabab
46	2021–22	Al-Hilal	Al-Ittihad
47	2022–23	Al-Ittihad	Al-Nassr
48	2023–24	Al-Hilal	Al-Nassr
49	2024–25	Al-Ittihad	Al-Hilal

== Stadiums ==
- Al-Batin Club Stadium
- Al-Bukiryah Club Stadium
- Al-Hazem Club Stadium
- Al Majma'ah Sports City
- Al-Najma Club Stadium
- Al-Okhdood Club Stadium
- Al-Shoulla Club Stadium
- Department of Education Stadium
- King Abdul Aziz Stadium
- King Abdullah Sport City Stadium (Buraidah)
- King Abdullah Sports City
- King Fahd International Stadium
- King Fahd Stadium
- King Khalid Sport City Stadium
- King Saud Sport City Stadium
- Mrsool Park
- Prince Abdul Aziz bin Musa'ed Stadium
- Prince Abdullah Al Faisal Stadium
- Prince Abdullah bin Jalawi Stadium
- Prince Faisal bin Fahd Stadium
- Prince Mohamed bin Fahd Stadium
- Prince Mohammed bin Abdul Aziz Stadium
- Prince Mohammed bin Abdullah Al Faisal Stadium
- Prince Saud bin Jalawi Stadium
- Prince Sultan bin Abdul Aziz Stadium
- Prince Turki bin Abdul Aziz Stadium

== Best Player of Asia award ==
Year	Player	Club
1994	Saeed Al-Owairan	Al-Shabab
2000	Nawaf Al-Temyat	Al-Hilal
2005	Hamad Al-Montashari	Al-Ittihad
2007	Yasser Al-Qahtani	Al-Hilal
2014	Nasser Al-Shamrani	Al-Hilal
2022	Salem Al-Dawsari	Al Hilal

== League system ==
The Saudi Arabia football association football league system is organized in a pyramidal shape similar to football league systems in many other countries. The principle of promotion and relegation binds the leagues.

== Women's football ==
Women's football is played in Saudi Arabia, but only in the affluent areas, as the country's very restrictive laws (especially those concerning women) inhibit the practice of the sport. In February 2020, Saudi Arabia launched a football league for women.

== Academies ==
In July 2020, the Saudi ministry of sport announced the establishment of Mahd Sports Academy, a sports academy which aims to scout, help, and train Saudi talent in various sports, including football. Once complete, the academy will be one of the largest in the world. In February 2024, The SAFF announced the accreditation of 33 existing private football academies. SAFF confirms the total number of football academies eligible for competitive play is now over 100.

== Attendances ==
The average attendance per top-flight football league season and the club with the highest average attendance:

Season	League average	Best club	Best club average
2024-25	8,355	Al-Ittihad	34,960
2023-24	8,159	Al-Ahli SFC	24,370
2022-23	9,339	Al-Ittihad	40,453
2021–22	8,176	Al-Ittihad	25,929
2020–21	—	—	—
2019–20	8,479	Al-Hilal	12,549
2018–19	8,361	Al-Ittihad	33,482
2017–18	5,766	Al-Ahli SFC	16,650
2016–17	7,053	Al-Ittihad	25,407
2015–16	6,893	Al-Ahli SFC	27,716
2014–15	9,676	Al-Ittihad	42,371

Sources: League pages on Wikipedia

== See also ==
- List of football clubs in Saudi Arabia
- List of football stadiums in Saudi Arabia
