= Majed Abdullah =

Saudi Arabian footballer (born 1959)

- Majed during his playing days

Personal information
- Full name: Majed Ahmed Abdullah
- Date of birth: 11 January 1959 (age 67)
- Place of birth: Jeddah, Saudi Arabia
- Height: 1.88 m (6 ft 2 in)
- Position: Striker

Youth career
- 1975–1977: Al-Nassr

Senior career*
Years	Team	Apps	(Gls)
1977–1998	Al-Nassr	194	(189)

International career
1975–1978	Saudi Arabia U17	4	(7)
1978–1994	Saudi Arabia	117	(72)
Medal record
Men's football
Representing Saudi Arabia
AFC Asian Cup
Winner	1984 Singapore
Winner	1988 Qatar
Asian Games
Silver medal – second place	1986 Seoul
Bronze medal – third place	1982 New Delhi
- * Club domestic league appearances and goals

Majed Ahmed Abdullah (Arabic: مَاجِد أَحْمَد عَبْد الله; born 11 January 1959) is a Saudi Arabian former professional footballer who played as a striker for Al-Nassr and the Saudi Arabia national team. He is the all-time leading goal scorer for Saudi Arabia with 72 goals in 117 games. At the club level, he is the record goal scorer for Al-Nassr and the all-time top scorer of the Saudi Pro League. He was often referred to by his nickname "The Arabian Pelé".

Majed Abdullah is regarded as one of the greatest Western Asian strikers of all time. He was nominated for IFFHS Asia's Player of the Century, finishing third place. He spent his entire club career at Al-Nassr, and scored 189 league goals in a twenty-one-year career. During this time, Al-Nassr established themselves as one of the dominant forces in Saudi and Asian football. With Abdullah leading the attack, Al-Nassr won five League titles and four King Cup titles as well as the 1997–98 Asian Cup Winners' Cup. Abdullah also finished as the Saudi League top scorer six times throughout his career. Majed Abdullah retired from football in 1998, after Al-Nassr's Asian Cup Winners' Cup Final victory over Suwon Samsung Bluewings.

His success was not limited to the domestic stage. In 1984 Saudi Arabia qualified for their first-ever global international tournament at the Olympic Games in Los Angeles. Abdullah scored their only goal as Saudi Arabia lost all three group games. International success did come in 1984, however, in the Asian Cup in Singapore. Saudi Arabia beat China 2–0 in the final to take the title for the first time, with Abdullah scoring the second goal. Four years later in 1988, he would score twice in the tournament in Qatar as the Saudi team retained the title by beating South Korea on penalties.

== Early life ==
Majed was born in the Al-Baghdadia District in Jeddah. Majed is the second son of Ahmed Abdullah. Living close to a sports club alongside being the son of a football manager piqued Majed's interest in football. In the mid-1960s, Abdullah and his family moved to Riyadh where his father got a job as the manager of Al-Nassr's youth team. Abdullah enrolled in Al-Jazaeria Elementary School and he passionately watched the older kids play football. A couple of years later, Majed joined the school football team as well as the neighborhood team. He used to play as a goalkeeper. One day the team's striker was absent and Majed had to replace him. This position change proved to be successful as Majed guided his team to a 3–1 victory. Abdullah's family moved to Hotat Khaled District and the young Abdullah joined Al-Motawasta Al-Thania high school. Majed and his neighbors formed a team they called "Al-Ittifaq". They tried to participate in a tournament but their request was rejected due to their young age. They did not give up and challenged one of Riyadh's best neighborhood teams for a place in that tournament. Al-Ittifaq won the match 3–1 with Abdullah scoring twice. Al-Ittifaq participated in the tournament and they went on to win the championship.

== Club career ==
Mohammed Al-Hudayan, a teammate at Al-Ittifaq, recommended Abdullah to Al-Nassr president Prince Abdulrahman Bin Saud, as did Al-Ittifaq's coach Nasseb Awad to Khaled Al-Turki and Al-Nassr coach Ljubiša Broćić. Broćić went to see Abdullah unannounced at Al-Ittifaq's training field in Al-Batha and requested that the club sign him. Abdullah officially joined Al-Nassr on 10 November 1975.

Abdullah spent 2 years playing for the youth teams before being promoted to the senior team. He made his senior debut in a friendly against Moroccan side Al-Fath in January 1977. He made his competitive debut on 20 January 1977 by coming off the bench in the league match against Al-Shabab replacing Ibrahim Al-Hamoud. Abdullah once again came off the bench in the 2–1 defeat to Al-Qadsiah on 14 March 1977 to make his second appearance for Al-Nassr. On 18 March, Abdullah made his first start as well as score his first goal for Al-Nassr, when he headed in Nasser Al-Johar's cross, in the league match against Al-Wehda. Following an injury to first-choice striker Mohammad Al-Abdeli, Abdullah was given a chance to prove himself. He repaid that trust by scoring three goals in the final three rounds of the league against Al-Shabab, Al-Ahli and derby rivals Al-Hilal. On 5 May 1977, Abdullah scored twice in the 4–0 against Hajer in the 1977 King Cup. He then scored twice against Al-Nahda in the Round of 16 and scored the opener in the 2–1 win against Al-Qadsiah in the quarter-finals. Al-Nassr were eventually eliminated in the semi-finals by Al-Hilal. He ended his first season at Al-Nassr scoring nine goals in ten appearances. Abdullah started his second season with Al-Nassr poorly, failing to score in his first three matches. On 4 November 1977, Abdullah scored a brace against Al-Nahda to score his first goals of the 1977–78 season. He then scored the only goal in a 1–0 win against Al-Qadsiah on 10 November. Abdullah scored his fourth goal of the season in a 1–0 win against Al-Ittihad. On 29 December, Abdullah was injured and forced to leave the pitch in the derby against Al-Hilal. He made his return on 12 January 1978 and scored in the 2–1 win against Al-Ettifaq. On 17 February, Abdullah scored the only goal in a 1–0 away win against Al-Nahda, his sixth of the season. On 2 March, Abdullah scored his first hattrick for Al-Nassr in the 4–0 win against Ohod. On 10 March, he scored his second hattrick in the 3–1 away win against Al-Ittihad. On 30 March, Abdullah scored twice against Al-Shate'e in the Round of 32 of the 1978 King Cup. Al-Nassr were eliminated by eventual champions Al-Ahli in the Round of 16. Majed ended the 1977–78 season scoring 14 goals in 19 appearances.

Majed Abdullah finished as the Saudi League top scorer 6 times in his career. He also won the League 4 times as well as the King Cup 4 times. Majed is the all-time top scorer of the Saudi League with 189 goals and is also Al-Nassr's all-time top scorer with 260 goals. Majed Abdullah announced his retirement on 12 April 1998 following Al-Nassr's win in the 1998 Asian Cup Winner's Cup in front of 70,000 fans in Riyadh.

== International career ==
=== Early years ===
Majed made his senior team debut in the 1978 Saudi Arabia Football Federation International Tournament, where scored two goals in his debut match against Pakistan, ending in a 6–0 victory. Majed played for Saudi Arabia in the 1979 Arabian Gulf Cup, scoring 7 goals in 6 matches, and notably scoring five against Qatar in a 7–0 win. He continued to play in the Arabian Gulf Cup, participating in the 1982, 1984 and 1986 tournaments.

=== International success ===
Majed represented his country at the 1984 AFC Asian Cup, first scoring a 90th-minute equalizer against South Korea in the group stage, then scoring again in the final against China to help Saudi Arabia secure their first Asian Cup title. He played in the next tournament in 1988, scoring a goal against Iran in the semi-finals and then converting his kick in the penalty shoot-out of the final against South Korea as his side retained their title. Majed also represented Saudi Arabia in the 1984 Summer Olympics, scoring a goal against Brazil.

=== Later years ===
He helped the country to a silver medal at the 1986 Asian Games, as well as another silver medal at the 1992 Arab Cup. Majed marked his last appearances for Saudi Arabia at the 1994 FIFA World Cup, then retired from international football shortly afterwards.

== Career statistics ==
=== Club ===
Club	Season	League			National Cup		League Cup		Continental		Other		Total	
Club	Season	Division	Apps	Goals	Apps	Goals	Apps	Goals	Apps	Goals	Apps	Goals	Apps	Goals
Al-Nassr	1976–77	SPL	6	4	4	5	—		—		—		10	9
Al-Nassr	1977–78	SPL	18	11	2	2	—		—		—		20	13
Al-Nassr	1978–79	SPL	17	18	3	6	—		—		—		20	24
Al-Nassr	1979–80	SPL	17	17	0	0	—		—		—		17	17
Al-Nassr	1980–81	SPL	15	21	4	4	—		—		—		19	25
Al-Nassr	1981–82	SPL	9	9	1	1	—		—		—		10	10
Al-Nassr	1982–83	SPL	15	14	3	3	—		—		4 (Note: Appearances in GCC Club Cup)	3	22	20
Al-Nassr	1983–84	SPL	0	0	0	0	—		—		—		0 (Note: Did not participate in the season due to the national team training camp)	0
Al-Nassr	1984–85	SPL	4	1	0	0	—		—		—		4	1
Al-Nassr	1985–86	SPL	16	15	2	1	—		—		—		18	16
Al-Nassr	1986–87	SPL	11	15	4	5	—		—		—		15	20
Al-Nassr	1987–88	SPL	6	5	3	2	—		—		—		9	7
Al-Nassr	1988–89	SPL	15	19	4	5	—		—		—		19	24
Al-Nassr	1989–90	SPL	12	13	3	5	—		—		—		15	18
Al-Nassr	1990–91	SPL	11	10	—		4	5	—		4	5	19	20
Al-Nassr	1991–92	SPL	2	3	—		0	0	2	1	—		4	4
Al-Nassr	1992–93	SPL	5	4	—		1	0	—		—		6	4
Al-Nassr	1993–94	SPL	0	0	—		0	0	—		—		0	0
Al-Nassr	1994–95	SPL	8	8	—		1	1	—		—		9	9
Al-Nassr	1995–96	SPL	3	0	—		2	2	6	0	4	5	15	7
Al-Nassr	1996–97	SPL	4	2	—		1	0	3	1	5 (Note: 2 appearances and 4 goals in Saudi Federation Cup, 3 appearances and 3 goals in GCC Club Cup)	7	13	10
Al-Nassr	1997–98	SPL	0	0	—		0	0	2	1	—		2	1
Career total			194	189	33	39	9	8	13	3	17	20	266	259 (Note: Unofficially, he scored 320 goals with Al-Nassr including 61 goals in friendly matches)

=== International ===
Statistics accurate as of match played 29 June 1994

Saudi Arabia
Year	Apps	Goals
1978	3	0
1979	6	7
1980	7	9
1981	11	4
1982	10	3
1983	0	0
1984	16	15
1985	7	3
1986	10	8
1987	0	0
1988	23	11
1989	7	2
1990	3	2
1991	0	0
1992	2	1
1993	9	6
1994	3	1
Total	117	72

=== International goals ===
No.	Cap	Date	Venue	Opponent	Score	Result	Competition
1	4	24 March 1979	Al-Shaab Stadium, Baghdad, Iraq	United Arab Emirates	2–1	2–1	5th Arabian Gulf Cup
2	5	28 March 1979	Al-Shaab Stadium, Baghdad, Iraq	Oman	4–0	4–0	5th Arabian Gulf Cup
3	7	4 April 1979	Al-Shaab Stadium, Baghdad, Iraq	Qatar	1–0	7–0	5th Arabian Gulf Cup
4	7	4 April 1979	Al-Shaab Stadium, Baghdad, Iraq	Qatar	2–0	7–0	5th Arabian Gulf Cup
5	7	4 April 1979	Al-Shaab Stadium, Baghdad, Iraq	Qatar	4–0	7–0	5th Arabian Gulf Cup
6	7	4 April 1979	Al-Shaab Stadium, Baghdad, Iraq	Qatar	5–0	7–0	5th Arabian Gulf Cup
7	7	4 April 1979	Al-Shaab Stadium, Baghdad, Iraq	Qatar	6–0	7–0	5th Arabian Gulf Cup
8	10	30 January 1980	Prince Faisal bin Fahd Stadium, Riyadh, Saudi Arabia	South Korea	1–0	1–3	Friendly
9	12	29 September 1980	İzmir Atatürk Stadium, İzmir, Turkey	Malaysia	1–0	3–0	1980 Islamic Games
10	15	12 December 1980	Prince Faisal bin Fahd Stadium, Riyadh, Saudi Arabia	Indonesia	1–0	8–0	Friendly
11	15	12 December 1980	Prince Faisal bin Fahd Stadium, Riyadh, Saudi Arabia	Indonesia	5–0	8–0	Friendly
12	15	12 December 1980	Prince Faisal bin Fahd Stadium, Riyadh, Saudi Arabia	Indonesia	6–0	8–0	Friendly
13	15	12 December 1980	Prince Faisal bin Fahd Stadium, Riyadh, Saudi Arabia	Indonesia	7–0	8–0	Friendly
14	15	12 December 1980	Prince Faisal bin Fahd Stadium, Riyadh, Saudi Arabia	Indonesia	8–0	8–0	Friendly
15	16	14 December 1980	Prince Abdullah Al Faisal Stadium, Jeddah, Saudi Arabia	Indonesia	1–0	3–0	Friendly
16	16	14 December 1980	Prince Abdullah Al Faisal Stadium, Jeddah, Saudi Arabia	Indonesia	2–0	3–0	Friendly
17	20	17 October 1981	Prince Faisal bin Fahd Stadium, Riyadh, Saudi Arabia	South Korea	2–0	2–0	Friendly
18	23	12 November 1981	Stadium Merdeka, Kuala Lumpur, Malaysia	China	2–0	2–4	1982 FIFA World Cup qualification
19	25	28 November 1981	Mount Smart Stadium, Auckland, New Zealand	New Zealand	1–1	2–2	1982 FIFA World Cup qualification
20	25	28 November 1981	Mount Smart Stadium, Auckland, New Zealand	New Zealand	2–1	2–2	1982 FIFA World Cup qualification
21	31	29 March 1982	Zayed Sports City Stadium, Abu Dhabi, United Arab Emirates	Qatar	1–0	1–0	6th Arabian Gulf Cup
22	33	2 April 1982	Zayed Sports City Stadium, Abu Dhabi, United Arab Emirates	Bahrain	1–1	2–2	6th Arabian Gulf Cup
23	33	2 April 1982	Zayed Sports City Stadium, Abu Dhabi, United Arab Emirates	Bahrain	2–2	2–2	6th Arabian Gulf Cup
24	38	21 February 1984	Prince Faisal bin Fahd Stadium, Riyadh, Saudi Arabia	Algeria	1–0	4–2	Friendly
25	38	21 February 1984	Prince Faisal bin Fahd Stadium, Riyadh, Saudi Arabia	Algeria	3–2	4–2	Friendly
26	39	10 March 1984	Royal Oman Police Stadium, Muscat, Oman	Qatar	1–1	1–2	7th Arabian Gulf Cup
27	41	25 September 1984	Prince Saud bin Jalawi Stadium, Khobar, Saudi Arabia	Iceland	1–0	1–2	Friendly
28	42	8 October 1984	Prince Abdullah Al Faisal Stadium, Jeddah, Saudi Arabia	Thailand	1–0	2–1	Friendly
29	44	19 October 1984	Prince Abdullah Al Faisal Stadium, Jeddah, Saudi Arabia	Nepal	2–0	7–0	1984 Asian Cup qualification
30	45	22 October 1984	Prince Abdullah Al Faisal Stadium, Jeddah, Saudi Arabia	United Arab Emirates	1–0	1–0	1984 Asian Cup qualification
31	46	24 October 1984	Prince Abdullah Al Faisal Stadium, Jeddah, Saudi Arabia	Sri Lanka	1–0	5–0	1984 Asian Cup qualification
32	46	24 October 1984	Prince Abdullah Al Faisal Stadium, Jeddah, Saudi Arabia	Sri Lanka	2–0	5–0	1984 Asian Cup qualification
33	46	24 October 1984	Prince Abdullah Al Faisal Stadium, Jeddah, Saudi Arabia	Sri Lanka	3–0	5–0	1984 Asian Cup qualification
34	47	26 October 1984	Prince Abdullah Al Faisal Stadium, Jeddah, Saudi Arabia	Oman	1–0	6–0	1984 Asian Cup qualification
35	47	26 October 1984	Prince Abdullah Al Faisal Stadium, Jeddah, Saudi Arabia	Oman	2–0	6–0	1984 Asian Cup qualification
36	47	26 October 1984	Prince Abdullah Al Faisal Stadium, Jeddah, Saudi Arabia	Oman	4–0	6–0	1984 Asian Cup qualification
37	48	2 December 1984	National Stadium, Kallang, Singapore	South Korea	1–1	1–1	1984 Asian Cup GS
38	53	16 December 1984	National Stadium, Kallang, Singapore	China	2–0	2–0	1984 Asian Cup Final
39	57	5 August 1985	Prince Moulay Abdellah Stadium, Rabat, Morocco	North Yemen	1–0	2–0	1985 Pan Arab Games GS
40	58	8 August 1985	Settat Municipal Stadium, Settat, Morocco	United Arab Emirates	1–0	1–0	1985 Pan Arab Games GS
41	59	14 August 1985	Mohammed V Stadium, Casablanca, Morocco	Iraq B	1–0	1–2	1985 Pan Arab Games SF
42	61	23 March 1986	Bahrain National Stadium, Riffa, Bahrain	Kuwait	1–3	1–3	8th Arabian Gulf Cup
43	62	25 March 1986	Bahrain National Stadium, Riffa, Bahrain	Bahrain	1–1	1–2	8th Arabian Gulf Cup
44	63	28 March 1986	Bahrain National Stadium, Riffa, Bahrain	Oman	1–0	3–1	8th Arabian Gulf Cup
45	63	28 March 1986	Bahrain National Stadium, Riffa, Bahrain	Oman	3–1	3–1	8th Arabian Gulf Cup
46	68	21 September 1986	Gwangju Mudeung Stadium, Gwangju, South Korea	Malaysia	2–1	3–1	1986 Asian Games GS
47	68	21 September 1986	Gwangju Mudeung Stadium, Gwangju, South Korea	Malaysia	3–1	3–1	1986 Asian Games GS
48	69	25 September 1986	Gwangju Mudeung Stadium, Gwangju, South Korea	Indonesia	1–0	2–0	1986 Asian Games GS
49	69	25 September 1986	Gwangju Mudeung Stadium, Gwangju, South Korea	Indonesia	2–0	2–0	1986 Asian Games GS
50	71	17 February 1988	Prince Faisal bin Fahd Stadium, Riyadh, Saudi Arabia	Scotland	2–2	2–2	Friendly
51	74	9 March 1988	King Fahd International Stadium, Riyadh, Saudi Arabia	Bahrain	1–0	1–0	9th Arabian Gulf Cup
52	75	13 March 1988	King Fahd International Stadium, Riyadh, Saudi Arabia	United Arab Emirates	2–2	2–2	9th Arabian Gulf Cup
53	79	23 June 1988	Olympic Park Stadium, Melbourne, Australia	New Zealand	1–3	2–3	Friendly
54	79	23 June 1988	Olympic Park Stadium, Melbourne, Australia	New Zealand	2–3	2–3	Friendly
55	80	29 June 1988	Olympic Park Stadium, Melbourne, Australia	Hong Kong	1–0	3–0	Friendly
56	82	6 July 1988	Football Park, Adelaide, Australia	Argentina	1–1	2–2	1988 Australia Gold Cup
57	84	13 July 1988	Olympic Park Stadium, Melbourne, Australia	Brazil	1–2	1–4	1988 Australia Gold Cup
58	86	16 November 1988	King Fahd International Stadium, Riyadh, Saudi Arabia	England	1–0	1–1	Friendly
59	87	23 November 1988	Prince Saud bin Jalawi Stadium, Khobar, Saudi Arabia	Tunisia	1–0	1–0	Friendly
60	92	15 December 1988	Hamad bin Khalifa Stadium, Doha, Qatar	Iran	1–0	1–0	1988 Asian Cup SF
61	94	15 March 1989	Prince Abdullah Al Faisal Stadium, Jeddah, Saudi Arabia	Syria	4–3	5–4	1990 FIFA World Cup qualification
62	97	5 April 1989	Prince Abdullah Al Faisal Stadium, Jeddah, Saudi Arabia	North Yemen	1–0	1–0	1990 FIFA World Cup qualification
63	101	24 September 1990	Xiannongtan Stadium, Beijing, China	Bangladesh	2–0	4–0	1990 Asian Games GS
64	101	24 September 1990	Xiannongtan Stadium, Beijing, China	Bangladesh	4–0	4–0	1990 Asian Games GS
65	104	11 September 1992	Al-Hamadaniah Stadium, Aleppo, Syria	Syria	1–0	1–1	1992 Arab Nations Cup GS
66	106	18 April 1993	National Stadium, Kallang, Singapore	New Zealand	2–1	3–1	Friendly
67	107	22 April 1993	National Stadium, Kallang, Singapore	Singapore	1–0	3–0	Friendly
68	109	16 May 1993	King Fahd International Stadium, Riyadh, Saudi Arabia	Malaysia	1–0	3–0	1994 FIFA World Cup qualification
69	109	16 May 1993	King Fahd International Stadium, Riyadh, Saudi Arabia	Malaysia	3–0	3–0	1994 FIFA World Cup qualification
70	110	18 May 1993	King Fahd International Stadium, Riyadh, Saudi Arabia	Kuwait	2–0	2–0	1994 FIFA World Cup qualification
71	112	27 September 1993	Prince Saud bin Jalawi Stadium, Khobar, Saudi Arabia	Singapore	2–0	3–2	Friendly
72	115	4 June 1994	Alex G. Spanos Stadium, San Luis Obispo, United States	Trinidad and Tobago	1–0	3–2	Friendly

== Firsts and lasts in Majed's life ==
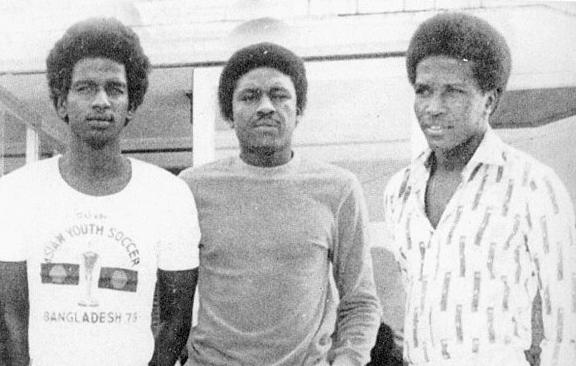
From the Left Majed Abdullah, Tawfiq Al-Muqrin and Abdullah Abed Rabbo in Iraq 1978.

=== Firsts ===
- First training camp with Al-Nassr was in London in 1976.
- First training camp with the National Team (under 17) was also in London in 1977.
- First coach with Al-Nassr was Ljubiša Broćić
- First coach with the National Team (under 17) was Jeff Faundon.
- First shirt number with Al-Nassr was 14.
- First shirt number with the National Team was 17.
- First match with Al-Nassr was against Al-Fath from Morocco in a friendly in 15-1-1977.
- First official match with Al-Nassr was against Al-Shabab in 22-1-1977.
- First goal with Al-Nassr was against Al-Wehda in 18-3-1977.
- First international goal was against Iran under 17 in 15-8-1977.
- First official goal with the Saudi Senior Team was against Pakistan in May 1978.
- First official Globally goal with the Saudi Senior Team was against Brazil in Olympic Games Los Angeles 1984.
- First "League Top Scorer" Trophy was in 1978–1979 season.

=== Lasts ===
- Last local match was against Al-Hilal in 1996–1997 season.
- Last local goal was against Al-Ittifaq in January 1997.
- Last local trophy was the Saudi Premier League 1994–1995 season.
- Last International match was against Belgium during 1994 FIFA World Cup in 29-6-1994.
- Last International goal was against Kuwait during 1994 FIFA World Cup qualifications.
- Last Globally goal with the Saudi Senior Team was against Brazil in Golden Cup Confederations in Australia 1988.
- Last goal with Al-Nassr was against Kopetdag of Turkmenistan in 11-4-1998.
- Last match with Al-Nassr was against Suwon Samsung Bluewings in the Asian Cup Winners Cup final on 13-4-1998.
- Last "League Top Scorer" Trophy was in 1988–1989 season.

== Honours ==
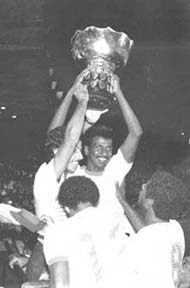
Abdullah lifting the AFC Asian Cup trophy in 1984

=== Player ===
Al-Nassr

- Saudi Premier League: 1979–80, 1980–81, 1988–89, 1994–95
- King's Cup: 1981, 1986, 1987, 1990
- GCC Club Championship: 1996, 1997
- Asian Cup Winners' Cup: 1997–98

Saudi Arabia

- AFC Asian Cup: 1984, 1988
- Asian Games silver medal: 1986
- Arab Nations Cup runner-up: 1992

Individual

- Saudi League top scorer: 1978–79, 1979–80, 1980–81, 1982–83, 1985–86, 1988–89
- King's Cup top scorer: 1979, 1987, 1989, 1990
- Arabian Golden Boot: 1981, 1989
- Arabian Gulf Cup top scorer: 1982
- Asia-Oceania Soccer Handbook Player of the Year: 1984
- Pan Arab Games top scorer: 1985
- Asian All Stars: 1985
- AFC Asian Cup Team of the Tournament: 1988
- Saudi Crown Prince Cup top scorer: 1991
- GCC Club Cup top scorer: 1991, 1996
- MasterCard Asian/Oceanian Team of the 20th Century: 1998
- IFFHS Asia's Player of the 20th Century third place: 1999
- IFFHS World's Player of the 20th Century 64th place: 2000
- IFFHS Asian Men's Team of the 20th Century: 2021
- IFFHS Asian Men's Team of All Time: 2021

== Retirement match ==
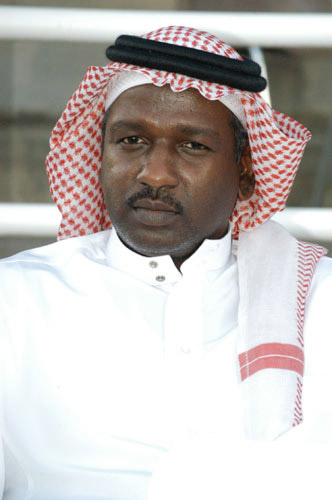
Majed Abdullah in 2012

On 20 May 2008, 10 years after Abdullah's last match, a testimonial match was held between Al-Nassr and Real Madrid, who were just crowned with their 31st La Liga title. The match was held at Al-Nassr's home ground, the King Fahd International Stadium in Riyadh. Al-Nassr won the match 4–1 with 70,000 fans in attendance. The match saw players from other clubs such as Mohamed Al-Deayea, Malek Mouath and Nashat Akram represent Al-Nassr. Arjen Robben broke the deadlock at the 50th before Mouath and Akram scored in quick succession. Saud Kariri then added a third in the 61st before Mouath scored the fourth goal in the first minute of stoppage time.

=== Match details ===
20 May 2008
21:15 AST

Al-Nassr (Saudi Arabia)	4–1	(Spain) Real Madrid
Malek 54', 90+1'; Akram 55'; Kariri 61'	Report	Robben 50'

King Fahd International Stadium, Riyadh
Attendance: 70,000
Referee: Mutraf Al-Qahtani

Al-Nassr	Real Madrid

== See also ==
- List of top international men's football goalscorers by country
- List of men's footballers with 100 or more international caps
- List of men's footballers with 50 or more international goals
- List of one-club men in association football
