= 1996 Saudi Crown Prince Cup =

1996 Crown Prince Cup
Tournament details
- Country: Saudi Arabia
- Dates: 15 April – 7 June 1996
- Teams: 16 (main competition)

Final positions
- Champions: Al-Shabab (2nd title)
- Runners-up: Al-Nassr
- Arab Cup Winners' Cup: Al-Shabab
- Asian Cup Winners' Cup: Al-Nassr

Tournament statistics
- Matches played: 15
- Goals scored: 42 (2.8 per match)
- Top goal scorer(s): Fahd Al-Hamdan; Fahad Al-Mehallel (4 goals each)

The 1996 Crown Prince Cup was the 21st season of the Saudi premier football knockout tournament since its establishment in 1957. The main competition started on 15 April and concluded with the final on 7 June 1996.

Al-Hilal were the defending champions; however, they were eliminated in the round of 16 by Al-Tai.

In the final, Al-Shabab defeated Al-Nassr 3–0 to secure their second title. The final was held at the Youth Welfare Stadium in Jeddah. As winners of the tournament, Al-Shabab chose to participate in the 1997 Arab Cup Winners' Cup. Thus, as runners-up, Al-Nassr qualified for the 1997–98 Asian Cup Winners' Cup.

== Qualifying rounds ==
All of the competing teams that are not members of the Premier League competed in the qualifying rounds to secure one of 4 available places in the Round of 16. First Division sides Al-Shoulla, Al-Wehda and Ohod and Second Division side Al-Tuhami qualified.

== Bracket ==
Round of 16
H	Al-Ettifaq	1
A	Al-Qadisiyah	0
A	Al-Ahli	0 (1)
H	Al-Shabab (pen.)	0 (3)
A	Al-Raed	1
H	Al-Shoulla	2
A	Al-Tai (pen.)	1 (3)
H	Al-Hilal	1 (0)
H	Al-Ittihad	5
A	Al-Wehda	0
A	Al-Taawoun	0
H	Al-Nassr	1
A	Al-Tuhami (asdet)	2
H	Ohod	1
H	Al-Najma	1
A	Al-Riyadh	2

Quarter-finals
A	Al-Ettifaq	0
H	Al-Shabab	1
H	Al-Shoulla	1
A	Al-Tai	2
A	Al-Ittihad	1
H	Al-Nassr	2
A	Al-Tuhami	0
H	Al-Riyadh	8

Semi-finals
H	Al-Shabab	5
A	Al-Tai	0
H	Al-Nassr	1
A	Al-Riyadh	0

Final
–	Al-Shabab	3
–	Al-Nassr	0

== Round of 16 ==
The draw for the Round of 16 and Quarter-finals was held on 6 April 1996. The Round of 16 fixtures were played on 15, 16 & 17 April 1996. All times are local, AST (UTC+3).

15 April 1996 2	Al-Najma (1)	1–2	Al-Riyadh (1)	Unaizah
15:45	Kwakye 17'	Report	Al-Hamdan 71'; Al-Suwailem 89'	Stadium: Department of Education Stadium

15 April 1996 4	Ohod (2)	1–2 (a.e.t.)	Al-Tuhami (3)	Medina
15:45	Idris 73'	Report	Baeshen 42'; Hadi 101'	Stadium: Prince Mohammed bin Abdul Aziz Stadium

15 April 1996 1	Al-Shabab (1)	0–0 (3–1 p)	Al-Ahli (1)	Riyadh
20:15		Report		Stadium: Youth Welfare Stadium in Al-Malaz; Referee: Ahmed Al-Kanhal
	Penalties
	Al-Anazi (penalty scored); Ayando (penalty scored); Al-Shenaif (penalty scored)		(penalty missed) Zubromawi; (penalty scored) Sheliah; (penalty missed) Saleh; (penalty missed) Abdulghani

15 April 1996 6	Al-Ittihad (1)	5–0	Al-Wehda (2)	Jeddah
20:15	Alfonso 65' (pen.), 71'; Al-A'araj 75'; Daghriri 81'; Fawal 87'	Report		Stadium: Youth Welfare Stadium; Referee: Abdul Rahman Al-Zaid

15 April 1996 7	Al-Shoulla (2)	2–1	Al-Raed (1)	Al-Kharj
20:15	Al-Khnain 48' (pen.), 70' (pen.)	Report	Diop 83'	Stadium: Al-Shoulla Club Stadium; Referee: Abdulaziz Al-Dakheel

16 April 1996 3	Al-Ettifaq (1)	1–0	Al-Qadisiyah (1)	Khobar
20:00	Asiri 19'	Report		Stadium: Prince Saud bin Jalawi Stadium; Referee: Yousef Al-Aqili

16 April 1996 8	Al-Hilal (1)	1–1 (0–3 p)	Al-Tai (1)	Riyadh
20:15	Al-Shareedah 52'	Report	Al-Ateeq 43'	Stadium: Youth Welfare Stadium in Al-Malaz; Referee: Omer Al Mehannah
	Penalties
	Al-Thunayan (penalty missed); Al-Shareedah (penalty missed); Al-Temawi (penalty missed)		(penalty scored) Al-Gablan; (penalty scored) Al-Jahaz; (penalty scored) Al-Ateeq

17 April 1996 5	Al-Nassr (1)	1–0	Al-Taawoun (1)	Riyadh
20:15	Al-Farhan 28'	Report		Stadium: Youth Welfare Stadium in Al-Malaz; Referee: Mohammed Al-Suwail

== Quarter-finals ==
The Quarter-finals fixtures were played on 19 April and 9 & 10 May 1996. All times are local, AST (UTC+3). Al-Riyadh's match was moved to 19 April due to their participation in the 1996 Arab Cup Winners' Cup.

19 April 1996 12	Al-Riyadh (1)	8–0	Al-Tuhami (3)	Riyadh
20:45	Al-Hamdan 18', 29', 74'; Al-Suwailem 31', 49'; Al Boushi 67', 80', 90'	Report		Stadium: Youth Welfare Stadium in Al-Malaz; Referee: Ibrahim Al-Omar

9 May 1996 9	Al-Nassr (1)	2–1	Al-Ittihad (1)	Riyadh
20:45	Kennedy 15'; Abdullah 71' (pen.)	Report	Swayed 50'	Stadium: Youth Welfare Stadium in Al-Malaz; Referee: Omer Al Mehannah

10 May 1996 10	Al-Shoulla (2)	1–2	Al-Tai (1)	Al-Kharj
20:45	Al-Hadayan 14'	Report	K. Al-Deayea 37'; Al-Jahaz 76'	Stadium: Al-Shoulla Club Stadium; Referee: Nasser Al-Hamdan

10 May 1996 11	Al-Shabab (1)	1–0	Al-Ettifaq (1)	Riyadh
20:45	Al-Mehallel 82'	Report		Stadium: Youth Welfare Stadium in Al-Malaz; Referee: Mohammed Al-Sharif

== Semi-finals ==
The draw for the Semi-finals was held on 11 May 1996. The Semi-finals fixtures were played on 23 & 26 May 1996. All times are local, AST (UTC+3). Al-Riyadh's match was postponed to 26 May due to their participation in the 1996 Arab Cup Winners' Cup.

23 May 1996 13	Al-Shabab (1)	5–0	Al-Tai (1)	Riyadh
20:45	Anwar 33'; Al-Mehallel 39', 56'; Rokbi 59'; Ayando 89' (pen.)	Report		Stadium: King Fahd International Stadium; Referee: Hassan Al-Buhairi

26 May 1996 14	Al-Nassr (1)	1–0	Al-Riyadh (1)	Riyadh
20:45	Abdullah 52'	Report		Stadium: King Fahd International Stadium; Referee: Abdulaziz Al-Eidan

== Final ==
The 1996 Crown Prince Cup Final was played on 7 June 1996 at the Youth Welfare Stadium in Jeddah between Al-Nassr and Al-Shabab. This was the fourth Crown Prince Cup final to be held at the stadium. This was Al-Nassr's fourth final and Al-Shabab's fourth final as well. All times are local, AST (UTC+3).

7 June 1996
21:00

Al-Shabab	3–0	Al-Nassr
Anwar 27'; Ayando 34' (pen.); Al-Mehallel 79'	Report

Youth Welfare Stadium, Jeddah
Referee: Abdul Rahman Al-Zaid

== Top goalscorers ==
Rank	Player	Club	Goals
1	(Saudi Arabia) Fahd Al-Hamdan	Al-Riyadh	4
1	(Saudi Arabia) Fahad Al-Mehallel	Al-Shabab	4
3	(Saudi Arabia) Khaled Al-Suwailem	Al-Riyadh	3
3	(Syria) Mohannad Al Boushi	Al-Riyadh	3
5	(Peru) Alfonso Yañez	Al-Ittihad	2
5	(Saudi Arabia) Abdulrahman Al-Khnain	Al-Shoulla	2
5	(Saudi Arabia) Majed Abdullah	Al-Nassr	2
5	(Saudi Arabia) Fuad Anwar	Al-Shabab	2
5	(Senegal) Mansour Ayando	Al-Shabab	2
