= Fahd Al-Hamdan =

Saudi Arabian footballer

Personal information
- Full name: Fahd Nasser Al-Hamdan
- Date of birth: 17 January 1966
- Place of birth: Riyadh, Saudi Arabia
- Date of death: 26 April 2013 (aged 47)
- Place of death: Riyadh, Saudi Arabia
- Height: 1.83 m (6 ft 0 in)
- Position: Striker

Senior career*
Years	Team	Apps	(Gls)
1984–2000	Al-Riyadh	252	(120)

International career
1993–1996	Saudi Arabia	9	(3)
- * Club domestic league appearances and goals

Fahd Nasser Al-Hamdan (Arabic: فهد ناصر الحمدان; 16 January 1966 – 26 April 2013) was a Saudi Arabian professional footballer who played as a striker for Al-Riyadh and the Saudi Arabia national team.

== Club career stats ==
As of match played 15 January 2025

Club	Season	League			King Cup		Saudi Crown Prince Cup		Saudi Federation Cup		Continental		Total	
Club	Season	Division	Apps	Goals	Apps	Goals	Apps	Goals	Apps	Goals	Apps	Goals	Goals	Apps
Al-Riyadh	1984–85	SPL		4										
Al-Riyadh	1985–86	SPL		5										
Al-Riyadh	1986–87	SFDL		+1										
Al-Riyadh	1987–88	SFDL		11										
Al-Riyadh	1988–89	SFDL		9										
Al-Riyadh	1989–90	SPL		12		2								
Al-Riyadh	1990–91	SPL		8										
Al-Riyadh	1991–92	SPL		11										
Al-Riyadh	1992–93	SPL		13										
Al-Riyadh	1993–94	SPL		14						11				
Al-Riyadh	1994–95	SPL		15				2						
Al-Riyadh	1995–96	SPL		5				4				6 (Note: 3 Goals in 1995 Arab Cup Winners' Cup) (Note: 3 Goals in 1995 Asian Cup Winners' Cup)		
Al-Riyadh	1996–97	SPL		13				0						
Al-Riyadh	1997–98	SPL		15				2						
Al-Riyadh	1998–99	SPL		4										
Al-Riyadh	1999–2000	SPL		1										
Career total				+141		3		9		28		6		+187
