= 1978–79 Saudi Premier League =

Premier League
- Season: 1978–79
- Champions: Al-Hilal (2nd title)
- Relegated: Al-Tai; Al-Riyadh
- Top goalscorer: (Saudi Arabia) Majed Abdullah (18 goals)

The 1978–79 season was the third season of the Saudi Premier League.

== Overview ==
Al-Tai and Al-Riyadh were relegated just one season after being promoted.

This season was the first to involve professional foreign players.

== Clubs ==
=== Stadia and locations ===
Locations of teams in the 1978–79 Saudi Premier League

| Club | Location | Stadium | Head coach |
|---|---|---|---|
| Al-Ahli | Jeddah | Prince Abdullah Al-Faisal Stadium | (Brazil) Didi |
| Al-Ettifaq | Dammam | Prince Mohamed bin Fahd Stadium | (Saudi Arabia) Khalil Al-Zayani |
| Al-Hilal | Riyadh | Prince Faisal bin Fahd Stadium | (Brazil) Mario Zagallo |
| Al-Ittihad | Jeddah | Prince Abdullah Al-Faisal Stadium | (West Germany) Dettmar Cramer |
| Al-Nahda | Khobar | Prince Saud bin Jalawi Stadium | |
| Al-Nassr | Riyadh | Prince Faisal bin Fahd Stadium | (Socialist Federal Republic of Yugoslavia) Ljubiša Broćić |
| Al-Qadsiah | Khobar | Prince Saud bin Jalawi Stadium | |
| Al-Riyadh | Riyadh | Al-Sayegh Stadium | |
| Al-Tai | Ha'il | Prince Abdul Aziz bin Musa'ed Stadium | |
| Al-Wehda | Mecca | King Abdul Aziz Stadium | |

=== Foreign players ===
| Club | Player 1 | Player 2 | Player 3 | Former players |
|---|---|---|---|---|
| Al-Ahli | (Tunisia) Tarak Dhiab | | | |
| Al-Ettifaq | | | | |
| Al-Hilal | (Brazil) Rivellino | (Tunisia) Ali Kaabi | (Tunisia) Néjib Limam | |
| Al-Ittihad | (West Germany) Theo Bücker | (Tunisia) Néjib Ghommidh | | (Sweden) Thomas Sjöberg |
| Al-Nahda | | | | |
| Al-Nassr | (Brazil) Jorge Luís | | | |
| Al-Qadsiah | | | | |
| Al-Riyadh | | | | (Tunisia) Mohamed Akid |
| Al-Tai | | | | |
| Al-Wehda | | | | |

== League table ==
| Pos | Team | Pld | Pts |
|---|---|---|---|
| 1 | Al-Hilal | 18 | 30 |
| 2 | Al-Nassr | 18 | 28 |
| 3 | Al-Ittihad | 18 | 24 |
| 4 | Al-Ahli | 18 | 20 |
| 5 | Al-Qadsiah | 18 | 19 |
| 6 | Al-Ettifaq | 18 | 16 |
| 7 | Al-Nahda | 18 | 14 |
| 8 | Al-Wehda | 18 | 14 |
| 9 | Al-Tai | 18 | 9 |
| 10 | Al-Riyadh | 18 | 7 |

Source: rsssf.com
- Promoted: Al-Shabab, Ohod.
- Full records are not known at this time

Saudi Premier League
1978–79 winners

2nd title
