= Saeed Al-Owairan =

Saudi Arabian footballer (born 1967)

Personal information
- Full name: Saeed Ali Al-Owairan Al-Dossari
- Date of birth: 19 August 1967 (age 59)
- Place of birth: Riyadh, Saudi Arabia
- Height: 1.84 m (6 ft 0 in)
- Position: Striker

Senior career*
Years	Team	Apps	(Gls)
1988–2001	Al-Shabab		(60+)

International career
1991–1998	Saudi Arabia	75	(24)
Medal record
Men's football
Representing Saudi Arabia
FIFA Arab Cup
Runner-up	1992
FIFA Confederations Cup
Runner-up	1992
AFC Asian Cup
Runner-up	1992
- * Club domestic league appearances and goals

Saeed Ali Al-Owairan Al-Dossari (Arabic: سَعِيد عَلِيّ الْعُوَيْرَان الدَّوْسَرِيّ; born 19 August 1967) is a Saudi Arabian former footballer who played as an attacking midfielder or forward for Saudi Pro League club Al-Shabab. Widely considered to be one of the greatest Asian footballers of all time, Al-Owairan is renowned for his goal against Belgium in the 1994 World Cup, which was considered the sixth-best in FIFA's Goal of the Century rankings, and earned him the nickname "the Maradona of the desert". He scored 283 goals across his 13-year career.

== Career ==
Owairan spent his entire club career at Al-Shabab, a Saudi club based in Riyadh.

He won 85 caps for the Saudi Arabia national team, scoring 34 goals, including seven in 1994 World Cup Qualifiers. He achieved international renown at the 1994 World Cup in the United States, in which he scored a stunning individual goal against Belgium at RFK Stadium in Washington, D.C. that was later voted the sixth best in FIFA's Goal of the Century rankings. The goal sent Saudi Arabia through to the second round of the World Cup for the first time. They subsequently lost 3–1 to Sweden in the Round of 16.

Following the World Cup, Owairan returned to Saudi Arabia. The same year he was named as Asian Footballer of the Year. Despite interest from European clubs, he was unable to leave the country due to a national law preventing Saudi footballers from playing abroad. Although he was selected as part of the Saudi Arabia national team at the 1998 World Cup in France, he only made two appearances as Saudi Arabia went out in the group stages.

== International goals ==
No.	Date	Venue	Opponent	Score	Result	Competition
1.	13 September 1992	Aleppo, Syria	Palestine	2–?	2–1	1992 Arab Cup
2.	17 September 1992	Aleppo, Syria	Egypt	2–2	2–3	1992 Arab Cup
3.	20 October 1992	Riyadh, Saudi Arabia	Argentina	1–3	1–3	1992 King Fahd Cup
4.	2 November 1992	Onomichi, Japan	Thailand	1–0	4–0	1992 AFC Asian Cup
5.	6 November 1992	Hiroshima, Japan	United Arab Emirates	1–0	2–0	1992 AFC Asian Cup
6.	1 May 1993	Kuala Lumpur, Malaysia	Macau	2–0	6–0	1994 FIFA World Cup qualification
7.	1 May 1993	Kuala Lumpur, Malaysia	Macau	3–0	6–0	1994 FIFA World Cup qualification
8.	14 May 1993	Riyadh, Saudi Arabia	Macau	4–0	8–0	1994 FIFA World Cup qualification
9.	14 May 1993	Riyadh, Saudi Arabia	Macau	6–0	8–0	1994 FIFA World Cup qualification
10.	14 May 1993	Riyadh, Saudi Arabia	Macau	7–0	8–0	1994 FIFA World Cup qualification
11.	18 May 1993	Riyadh, Saudi Arabia	Kuwait	1–0	2–0	1994 FIFA World Cup qualification
12.	24 October 1993	Doha, Qatar	Iraq	1–1	1–1	1994 FIFA World Cup qualification
13.	29 June 1994	Washington, D.C., United States	Belgium	1–0	1–0	1994 FIFA World Cup
14.	10 November 1994	Abu Dhabi, UAE	Bahrain	2–0	3–1	12th Arabian Gulf Cup

== Club career stats ==
As of match played 1 July 2023

Club	Season	League			King Cup		Saudi Crown Prince Cup		Arabian Compétitions		GCC Champions League		Asian Compétitions	
Club	Season	Division	Apps	Goals	Apps	Goals	Apps	Goals	Apps	Goals	Apps	Goals	Apps	Goals
Al Shabab	1988–89	SPL												
Al Shabab	1989–90	SPL												
Al Shabab	1990–91	SPL												
Al Shabab	1991–92	SPL		16										
Al Shabab	1992–93	SPL								4 (Note: 4 Goals in 1992 Arab Club Champions Cup)		3		4 (Note: 4 Goals in 1992–93 Asian Club Championship)
Al Shabab	1993–94	SPL										4		
Al Shabab	1994–95	SPL								1 (Note: 1 Goal in 1995 Arab Cup Winners' Cup)				1 (Note: 1 Goal in 1994–95 Asian Club Championship)
Al Shabab	1995–96	SPL												
Al Shabab	1996–97	SPL								1 (Note: 1 Goal in 1997 Arab Cup Winners' Cup)				
Al Shabab	1997–98	SPL												
Al Shabab	1998–99	SPL		11										
Al Shabab	1999–2000	SPL		4						4 (Note: 3 Goals in 1999 Arab Club Champions Cup) (Note: 1 Goal in 2000 Arab Super Cup)				
Al Shabab	2000–01	SPL		2										
Career total				60				10		10		8		5

== Honours ==
Al-Shabab

- Arab Club Champions Cup:1992,1999
- Saudi Premier League :1990–91,1991–92,1992–93
- Asian Cup Winners' Cup:2000–01

Saudi Arabia

- Arab Nations Cup runner-up:1992
- King Fahd Cup runner-up:1992
- AFC Asian Cup runner-up:1992

Individual

- IFFHS World's Top Goal Scorer: 1993
- Best Bombardier Saudi Premier League:1991–92
