= 1979–80 Saudi Premier League =

Saudi Premier League
- Season: 1979–80
- Champions: Al-Nassr (2nd title)
- Relegated: Al-Wehda; Ohod
- Top goalscorer: Majed Abdullah (17 goals)

The 1979–80 season was the fourth edition of the Saudi Premier League.

== Overview ==
The league was won by Al-Nassr for the second time.

Newly promoted side Ohod were relegated alongside Al-Wehda for the first time, meaning that the city of Mecca would not be represented in the top flight for the first time since the league began.

== Clubs ==
=== Stadia and locations ===
Locations of teams in the 1979-80 Saudi Premier League

Club	Location	Stadium	Head coach
Al-Ahli	Jeddah	Prince Abdullah Al-Faisal Stadium	(Brazil) Didi
Al-Ettifaq	Dammam	Prince Mohamed bin Fahd Stadium	(Saudi Arabia) Khalil Al-Zayani
Al-Hilal	Riyadh	King Fahd Stadium	(Brazil) Rubens Minelli
Al-Ittihad	Jeddah	Prince Abdullah Al-Faisal Stadium	(West Germany) Dettmar Cramer
Al-Nahda	Khobar	Prince Saud bin Jalawi Stadium	
Al-Nassr	Riyadh	King Fahd Stadium	(Brazil) Chico Formiga
Al-Qadsiah	Khobar	Prince Saud bin Jalawi Stadium	
Al-Shabab	Riyadh	King Fahd Stadium	
Al-Wehda	Mecca	King Abdul Aziz Stadium	
Ohod	Medina	Education Stadium	(Sudan) Mansour Ramadan

=== Foreign players ===
Club	Player 1	Player 2	Player 3	Player 4	Player 5	Player 6	Former players
Al-Ahli	(Brazil) Zenon	(Tunisia) Mohsen Labidi	(Tunisia) Tarak Dhiab				
Al-Ettifaq							
Al-Hilal	(Brazil) Rivellino	(Tunisia) Ali Kaabi	(Tunisia) Néjib Limam				
Al-Ittihad	(East Germany) Erich Beer	(Germany) Theo Bücker					
Al-Nahda							
Al-Nassr	(Brazil) Lino	(Brazil) Luizinho das Arábias	(Brazil) Toninho	(Tunisia) Abderraouf Ben Aziza	(Tunisia) Mohamed Ben Rehaiem	(Tunisia) Mokhtar Dhouieb	(Brazil) Jorge Luís
Al-Qadsiah							
Al-Shabab							
Al-Wehda							(Morocco) Mustapha Choukri
Ohod	(Tunisia) Habib Majeri						

== League table ==
Pos	Team	Pld	Pts
1	Al-Nassr	18	29
2	Al-Hilal	18	26
3	Al-Ittihad	18	21
4	Al-Ahli	18	21
5	Al-Shabab	18	17
6	Al-Ettifaq	18	16
7	Al-Nahda	18	15
8	Al-Qadsiah	18	14
9	Al-Wehda	18	13
10	Ohod	18	8

Source: rsssf.com
- Promoted: Al-Jabalain, Al-Riyadh.
- Full records are not known at this time

Saudi Premier League
1979–80 winners
Al-Nassr
2nd title
