= 1980–81 Saudi Premier League =

Saudi Premier League
- Season: 1980–81
- Champions: Al-Nassr (3rd title)
- Relegated: Al-Jabalain; Al-Riyadh
- Top goalscorer: Majed Abdullah (21 goals)

The 1980–81 season was the fifth edition of the Saudi Premier League.

== Overview ==
The league title was won once again by Al-Nassr for the second time in consecutive years and third time in overall.

Newly promoted sides Al-Riyadh and Al-Jabalain were initially relegated, though the Premier League and First Division would merge for the 1981–82 season, keeping them in the top flight for that year.

== Clubs ==
=== Stadia and locations ===
Locations of teams in the 1980-81 Saudi Premier League

Club	Location	Stadium	Head coach
Al-Ahli	Jeddah	Prince Abdullah Al-Faisal Stadium	(Brazil) Didi
Al-Ettifaq	Dammam	Prince Mohamed bin Fahd Stadium	(Saudi Arabia) Khalil Al-Zayani
Al-Hilal	Riyadh	King Fahd Stadium	(Brazil) Rubens Minelli
Al-Ittihad	Jeddah	Prince Abdullah Al-Faisal Stadium	(West Germany) Dettmar Cramer
Al-Jabalain	Ha'il	Prince Abdul Aziz bin Musa'ed Stadium	
Al-Nahda	Khobar	Prince Saud bin Jalawi Stadium	
Al-Nassr	Riyadh	King Fahd Stadium	(Brazil) Chico Formiga
Al-Qadsiah	Khobar	Prince Saud bin Jalawi Stadium	
Al-Riyadh	Riyadh	Prince Faisal bin Fahd Stadium	
Al-Shabab	Riyadh	King Fahd Stadium	

=== Foreign players ===
Club	Player 1	Player 2	Player 3	Player 4	Former players
Al-Ahli	(Tunisia) Mohsen Labidi				(Brazil) Zenon
Al-Ettifaq	(Brazil) Jorge Parraga				
Al-Hilal	(Brazil) Dé Aranha	(Brazil) Rivellino	(Tunisia) Ali Kaabi	(Tunisia) Néjib Limam	
Al-Ittihad	(East Germany) Erich Beer	(Germany) Theo Bücker			
Al-Jabalain					
Al-Nahda					
Al-Nassr	(Brazil) Aílton Lira	(Brazil) Manguito	(Brazil) Toninho	(Tunisia) Abderraouf Ben Aziza	
Al-Qadsiah					
Al-Riyadh	(Algeria) Fathi Chebel				
Al-Shabab					

== League table ==
Pos	Team	Pld	Pts
1	Al-Nassr	18	26
2	Al-Hilal	18	24
3	Al-Qadsiah	18	22
4	Al-Ahli	18	21
5	Al-Ettifaq	18	20
6	Al-Ittihad	18	19
7	Al-Shabab	18	19
8	Al-Nahda	18	16
9	Al-Jabalain	18	5
10	Al-Riyadh	18	5

Source: rsssf.com
- Promoted Al-Rawdah, Al-Wehda.
- Full records are not known at this time

Saudi Premier League
1980–81 winners

3rd title
