= 1975–76 Saudi Premier League =

Association football season

Premier League
- Season: 1975–76
- Champions: Canceled

The 1975–76 Saudi Premier League was the first league to be named Saudi Premier League. The Saudi League and all sports championships in that season were canceled for the assassination of King Faisal that year.

== Clubs ==
=== Stadia and locations ===
Locations of teams in the 1975–76 Saudi Premier League

Club	Location	Stadium	Head coach
Al-Ahli	Jeddah	Prince Abdullah Al-Faisal Stadium	(Egypt) Taha Ismail
Al-Hilal	Riyadh	Prince Faisal bin Fahd Stadium	(England) George Smith
Al-Ittihad	Jeddah	Prince Abdullah Al-Faisal Stadium	(Tunisia) Ali Selmi
Al-Nassr	Riyadh	Prince Faisal bin Fahd Stadium	(Egypt) Mahmoud Abou-Regaila
Al-Qadsiah	Khobar	Prince Saud bin Jalawi Stadium	
Al-Riyadh	Riyadh	Al-Sayegh Stadium	
Al-Shabab	Riyadh	Prince Faisal bin Fahd Stadium	
Al-Wehda	Mecca	King Abdul Aziz Stadium	(Egypt) Raafat Attia

=== Foreign players ===
Club	Player 1	Player 2
Al-Ahli		
Al-Hilal	(England) Eamonn O'Keefe	(Tunisia) Ali Kaabi
Al-Ittihad	(Tunisia) Taoufik Belghith	
Al-Nassr	(Sudan) Ali Gagarin	
Al-Qadsiah		
Al-Riyadh		
Al-Shabab		
Al-Wehda		

== League table ==
Pos	Team	Pld	Pts
1	Al-Hilal	4	7
2	Al-Ahli	4	6
3	Al-Nassr	4	6
4	Al-Qadsiah	4	4
5	Al-Ittihad	4	4
6	Al-Shabab	4	3
7	Al-Wehda	4	2
8	Al-Riyadh	4	0

Source: rsssf.com
