= 1988–89 Saudi Premier League =

Premier League
- Season: 1988–89
- Champions: Al-Nassr (4th title)
- Relegated: Hajer; Al-Rawdhah
- Top goalscorer: Majed Abdullah (19 goals)

Al-Nassr won the championship for the fourth time in 1989, keeping the title in the city of Riyadh.

Hajer and Al-Rawdhah entered the top flight, but like most other clubs in their position season's before, went straight back down.

== Stadia and locations ==
Locations of teams in the 1988-89 Saudi Premier League

Club	Location	Stadium
Al-Ahli	Jeddah	Prince Abdullah Al-Faisal Stadium
Al-Ettifaq	Dammam	Prince Mohamed bin Fahd Stadium
Al-Hilal	Riyadh	King Fahd Stadium
Al-Ittihad	Jeddah	Prince Abdullah Al-Faisal Stadium
Al-Nahda	Khobar	Prince Saud bin Jalawi Stadium
Al-Nassr	Riyadh	King Fahd Stadium
Al-Qadsiah	Al Khubar	Prince Saud bin Jalawi Stadium
Al-Rawdhah	Al-Jeshah	Prince Abdullah bin Jalawi Stadium
Al-Shabab	Riyadh	King Fahd Stadium
Al-Ta'ee	Ha'il	Prince Abdul Aziz bin Musa'ed Stadium
Al-Wehda	Mecca	King Abdul Aziz Stadium
Hajer	Al-Hasa	Prince Abdullah bin Jalawi Stadium

== Final league table ==
Pos	Team	Pld	W	D	L	GF	GA	GD	Pts
1	Al-Nassr	22	15	5	2	43	18	+25	35
2	Al-Shabab	22	13	6	3	37	15	+22	32
3	Al-Hilal	22	12	5	5	40	15	+25	29
4	Al-Ahli	22	12	4	6	27	13	+14	28
5	Al-Ettifaq	22	10	7	5	33	16	+17	27
6	Al-Ittihad	22	10	7	5	21	15	+6	27
7	Al-Ta'ee	22	7	7	8	22	25	−3	21
8	Al-Qadsiah	22	5	8	9	28	24	+4	18
9	Al-Nahda	22	5	7	10	19	31	−12	17
10	Al-Wehda	22	4	6	12	17	33	−16	14
11	Hajer	22	2	10	10	16	40	−24	14
12	Al-Rawdhah	22	0	2	20	15	73	−58	2

Source: rsssf.com

Al-Riyadh and Al-Raed were promoted.

Saudi Premier League
1988–89 winners
Al-Nassr
4th title
