= 1985–86 Saudi Premier League =

Saudi Professional League
- Season: 1985–86
- Champions: Al-Hilal
- Relegated: Al-Riyadh; Al-Kawkab
- Matches: 10
- Top goalscorer: Majed Abdullah (15 goals)

1985 saw the dawn of another new era in Saudi Arabian football with the league once again cut into two groups.

Al-Tai were once again promoted, replacing city neighbours Al-Jabalain who were relegated the previous season.

The winners and runners up of each six team group advanced to the finals phase to crown a champion, of which Al-Hilal won and defended the championship.

Teams finishing third and fourth in the group phases then played off for classification purposes and the teams finishing 5th and 6th played out a relegation pool. Newly promoted Al Kawkab were relegated along with Al-Riyadh.

== Stadia and locations ==
Locations of teams in the 1985-86 Saudi Premier League

Club	Location	Stadium
Al-Ahli	Jeddah	Prince Abdullah Al-Faisal Stadium
Al-Ettifaq	Dammam	Prince Mohamed bin Fahd Stadium
Al-Hilal	Riyadh	King Fahd Stadium
Al-Ittihad	Jeddah	Prince Abdullah Al-Faisal Stadium
Al-Kawkab FC	Al-Kharj	Al-Shoalah Stadium club
Al-Nahda	Khobar	Prince Saud bin Jalawi Stadium
Al-Nassr	Riyadh	King Fahd Stadium
Al-Qadsiah	Al Khubar	Prince Saud bin Jalawi Stadium
Al-Riyadh	Riyadh	Prince Faisal bin Fahd Stadium
Al-Shabab	Riyadh	King Fahd Stadium
Al-Ta'ee	Ha'il	Prince Abdul Aziz bin Musa'ed Stadium
Al-Wehda	Mecca	King Abdul Aziz Stadium

== League tables ==
=== Group A ===
Pos	Team	Pld	Pts
1	Al-Nassr	10	14
2	Al-Hilal	10	13
3	Al-Ahli	10	10
4	Al-Ta'ee	10	9
5	Al-Riyadh	10	8
6	Al-Nahda	10	6

Source: rsssf.com

=== Group B ===
Pos	Team	Pld	Pts
1	Al-Ittihad	10	15
2	Al-Wehda	10	11
3	Al-Ettifaq	10	10
4	Al-Shabab	10	9
5	Al-Kawkab FC	10	8
6	Al-Qadsiah	10	7

Source: rsssf.com

=== Championship pool ===
Pos	Team	Pld	Pts
1	Al-Hilal	6	9
2	Al-Ittihad	6	7
3	Al-Nassr	6	4
4	Al-Wehda	6	4

Source: rsssf.com

=== Classification pool ===
Pos	Team	Pld	Pts
1	Al-Ta'ee	6	7
2	Al-Ahli	6	7
3	Al-Ettifaq	6	5
4	Al-Shabab	6	5

Source: rsssf.com

=== Relegation pool ===
Pos	Team	Pld	Pts
1	Al-Qadsiah	6	8
2	Al-Nahda	6	8
3	Al-Kawkab FC	6	5
4	Al-Riyadh	6	3

Source: rsssf.com

Promoted: Al-Raed, Al-Ansar

- Full records not currently known

Saudi Premier League
1985-86 winners
Al-Hilal
4th title
