= 1987–88 Saudi Premier League =

Saudi Professional League
- Season: 1987–88
- Champions: Al-Hilal
- Relegated: Al-Kawkb; Ohud

Statistics of the 1987–88 Saudi Premier League.

== Stadia and locations ==
Locations of teams in the 1987-88 Saudi Premier League

Club	Location	Stadium
Al-Ahli	Jeddah	Prince Abdullah Al-Faisal Stadium
Ohud	Medina	Prince Mohammed bin Abdul Aziz Stadium
Al-Ettifaq	Dammam	Prince Mohamed bin Fahd Stadium
Al-Hilal	Riyadh	King Fahd Stadium
Al-Ittihad	Jeddah	Prince Abdullah Al-Faisal Stadium
Al-Nahda	Khobar	Prince Saud bin Jalawi Stadium
Al-Nassr	Riyadh	King Fahd Stadium
Al-Qadsiah	Al Khubar	Prince Saud bin Jalawi Stadium
Al-Kawkb	Al-Kharj	Al-Shoalah Stadium club
Al-Shabab	Riyadh	King Fahd Stadium
Al-Ta'ee	Ha'il	Prince Abdul Aziz bin Musa'ed Stadium
Al-Wehda	Mecca	King Abdul Aziz Stadium

== League table ==
Pos	Team	Pld	Pts
1	Al-Hilal	22	34
2	Al-Ettifaq	22	32
3	Al-Nassr	22	32
4	Al-Ittihad	22	27
5	Al-Shabab	22	24
6	Al-Ta'ee	22	22
7	Al-Qadsiah	22	20
8	Al-Nahda	22	18
9	Al-Wehda	22	17
10	Al-Ahli	22	17
11	Ohud	22	15
12	Al-Kawkb	22	6

Source: rsssf.com
- Promoted: Hajer club and Al-Rawdah
- Full records are not known at this time

Saudi Premier League
1987–88 winners
Al-Hilal
5th title
