= 1994–95 Saudi Premier League =

Saudi Premier League
- Season: 1994–95
- Champions: Al-Nassr (6th title)
- Relegated: Al-Wehda; Al-Rawdhah
- Asian Club Championship: Al-Nassr
- Top goalscorer: Fahd Al-Hamdan (15 goals)

Statistics of 1994–95 Saudi Premier League season. Al-Nassr defended the title and claimed their sixth league title after beating Al-Hilal in the final.

== Overview ==
Al-Nassr defended the championship and claimed their sixth title. The SAFF rules stipulated that both teams in the championship final had to play away, so although both finalists are from Riyadh, the final was played in Jeddah. Al-Nassr had four coaches during the season. Yousef Khamees was the lucky one to win the final, following the successive sackings of Jean Fernandez and Henri Michel.

== Clubs ==
=== Stadia and locations ===
Locations of teams in the 1994-95 Saudi Premier League

Club	Location	Stadium	Head coach
Al-Ahli	Jeddah	Prince Abdullah Al-Faisal Stadium	(Brazil) Cabralzinho
Al-Ettifaq	Dammam	Prince Mohamed bin Fahd Stadium	(Saudi Arabia) Khalil Al-Zayani
Al-Hilal	Riyadh	King Fahd Stadium	(Brazil) Oscar
Al-Ittihad	Jeddah	Prince Abdullah Al-Faisal Stadium	
Al-Nassr	Riyadh	King Fahd Stadium	(Saudi Arabia) Yousef Khamees
Al-Najma	Unaizah	Al-Najma Club Stadium	
Al-Qadsiah	Khobar	Prince Saud bin Jalawi Stadium	
Al-Raed	Buraidah	King Abdullah Sport City Stadium	
Al-Rawdhah	Al-Jeshah	Prince Abdullah bin Jalawi Stadium	
Al-Riyadh	Riyadh	King Fahd Stadium	(Brazil) Zé Mário
Al-Shabab	Riyadh	King Fahd Stadium	
Al-Wehda	Mecca	King Abdul Aziz Stadium	(Federal Republic of Yugoslavia) Pavle Dolezar

=== Foreign players ===
Club	Player 1	Player 2	Player 3	Player 4	Former players
Al-Ahli					(Tunisia) Nabil Maâloul
Al-Ettifaq	(Brazil) Soares	(Senegal) Victor Diagne			
Al-Hilal	(Brazil) Sérgio Soares	(Morocco) Ahmed Bahja	(Morocco) Saïd Chiba	(Tunisia) Faouzi Rouissi	
Al-Ittihad	(Germany) Jens Friedemann	(Morocco) Aziz Ouzougate	(Russia) Oleg Sergeyev	(Russia) Vladimir Tatarchuk	
Al-Najma	(Morocco) Aziz Lagraoui				
Al-Nassr	(Albania) Hysen Zmijani	(Ghana) Ohene Kennedy	(Ivory Coast) Sam Abouo	(Liberia) Alexander Freeman	
Al-Qadsiah	(Ghana) Shamo Quaye				
Al-Raed					
Al-Rawdhah					
Al-Riyadh					
Al-Shabab	(Ghana) Ablade Kumah	(Senegal) Mansour Ayanda			
Al-Wehda					

== Final league table ==
Pos	Team	Pld	W	D	L	GF	GA	GD	Pts
1	Al-Hilal	22	12	7	3	40	17	+23	43
2	Al-Ettifaq	22	12	5	5	46	25	+21	41
3	Al-Riyadh	22	11	8	3	36	21	+15	41
4	Al-Nassr	22	11	7	4	35	19	+16	40
5	Al-Shabab	22	10	4	8	36	33	+3	34
6	Al-Ahli	22	7	10	5	32	31	+1	31
7	Al-Ittihad	22	8	6	8	32	20	+12	30
8	Al-Qadsiah	22	8	5	9	32	36	−4	29
9	Al-Raed	22	6	5	11	24	38	−14	23
10	Al-Najma	22	5	6	11	31	42	−11	21
11	Al-Wehda	22	6	3	13	25	49	−24	21
12	Al-Rawdhah	22	1	4	17	19	57	−38	7

== Playoffs ==
=== Semifinals ===
1 June 1995	Al-Hilal	1–0 (a.e.t.)	Al-Riyadh	King Fahd International Stadium, Riyadh
	Yousuf Al-Thunayan 113'			Referee: Ibrahim Al-Omar

2 June 1995	Al-Ettifaq	1–2	Al-Nassr	Prince Saud bin Jalawi Stadium, Khobar
	Victor Diagne 66'		33' Ohene Kennedy; 41' Fahad Al-Bishi	Referee: Mohammed Al-Sharif

=== Third place match ===
7 June 1995	Al-Ettifaq	0–4	Al-Riyadh	Prince Saud bin Jalawi Stadium, Khobar
			Fahd Al-Hamdan; Fahd Al-Hamdan; Marco; Nasser Al-Dosari	Referee: Abdulaziz Al Eidan

=== Final ===
9 June 1995	Al-Hilal	1–3	Al-Nassr	Prince Abdullah Al-Faisal Stadium, Jeddah
	Mansour Al-Muwain 37'		5' Majed Abdullah; 22' Majed Abdullah; 30' Mohaisen Al-Jam'an	Referee: Ibrahim Al-Omar

Saudi Premier League
1994-95 winners

6th title
