= 1990–91 Saudi Premier League =

Saudi Professional League
- Season: 1990–91
- Champions: Al-Shabab
- Relegated: Al-Najma; Al-Arabi

In December 1990, the Saudi Federation decided to merge all the football League with the King's Cup in one tournament and the addition of the Golden Box. The Golden Box would be an end of season knockout competition played between the top four teams of the regular league season.

These teams would play at a semi-final stage to crown the champions of Saudi Arabia.

Al-Shabab came out on top and won their first championship. At the other end of the table, promoted sides Al-Najma and Al-Arabi struggled and were relegated.

== Stadia and locations ==
Locations of teams in the 1990-91 Saudi Premier League

Club	Location	Stadium
Al-Ahli	Jeddah	Prince Abdullah Al-Faisal Stadium
Al-Ettifaq	Dammam	Prince Mohamed bin Fahd Stadium
Al-Hilal	Riyadh	King Fahd Stadium
Al-Ittihad	Jeddah	Prince Abdullah Al-Faisal Stadium
Al-Arabi	Unaizah	Department of Education Stadium
Al-Nassr	Riyadh	King Fahd Stadium
Al-Qadsiah	Al Khubar	Prince Saud bin Jalawi Stadium
Al-Riyadh	Riyadh	King Fahd Stadium
Al-Shabab	Riyadh	King Fahd Stadium
Al-Ta'ee	Ha'il	Prince Abdul Aziz bin Musa'ed Stadium
Al-Wehda	Mecca	King Abdul Aziz Stadium
Al-Najma	Unaizah	Al-Najma Club Stadium

== Final league table ==
Pos	Team	Pld	W	D	L	GF	GA	GD	Pts
1	Al-Shabab	22	14	6	2	38	15	+23	34
2	Al-Nassr	22	13	6	3	30	14	+16	32
3	Al-Hilal	22	12	7	3	28	10	+18	31
4	Al-Ettifaq	22	11	6	5	29	18	+11	28
5	Al-Ittihad	22	9	8	5	24	14	+10	26
6	Al-Riyadh	22	10	3	9	28	30	−2	23
7	Al-Ahli	22	7	8	7	24	17	+7	22
8	Al-Ta'ee	22	4	11	7	22	29	−7	19
9	Al-Qadsiah	22	5	8	9	17	23	−6	18
10	Al-Wehda	22	4	9	9	14	26	−12	17
11	Al-Najma	22	0	8	14	13	35	−22	8
12	Al-Arabi	22	0	6	16	12	48	−36	6

Promoted: Ohud, Al-Nahda.

=== Semifinals ===
28 June 1991	Al-Hilal	2–2	Al-Shabab	King Fahd Stadium, Riyadh
	Mansour Al-Mowena 33'; Yousef Jazea'a 32'		65' Fahad Al-Mehallel; 67' Khaled Al-Dossari

29 June 1991	Al-Ettifaq	1–2	Al-Nassr	Prince Saud bin Jalawi Stadium, Al Khubar
	Rashid Al-Khalil 42'		10' Majed Abdullah; 30' Majed Abdullah	Referee: Abdul Rahman Al-Zeid

5 July 1991	Al-Shabab	2–1 (a.e.t.)	Al-Hilal	King Fahd Stadium, Riyadh
	Saeed Al-Owairan 8'; Khalid Al-Shanif 91'		43' (pen.) Sami Al-Jaber	Referee: Mohammed Al-Sharif

6 July 1991	Al-Nassr	1–1	Al-Ettifaq	King Fahd Stadium, Riyadh
	Majed Abdullah 67'		85' Saleh Nasser	Referee: Abdullah Al-Nasser

=== Third place match ===
11 July 1991	Al-Hilal	2-1	Al-Ettifaq	Prince Faisal bin Fahd Stadium, Riyadh
	38' Khaled Al-Nafisah; 84' Mohammed Al-Temyat		Rashid Al-Khalil 67'	Referee: Hassan Al-Beheiri

=== Final ===
17 July 1991	Al-Nassr	0-1	Al-Shabab	Prince Abdullah al-Faisal Stadium, Jeddah
			35' Fahad Al-Mehallel	Referee: Abdul Rahman Al-Zeid

Saudi Premier League
1990-91 winners
Al-Shabab
1st title
