= 1976–77 Saudi Premier League =

Saudi Premier League
- Season: 1976–77
- Champions: Al-Hilal (1st title)
- Relegated: Al-Riyadh
- Top goalscorer: (Saudi Arabia) Nasser Eid (7 goals)

The 1976–77 season marked the inception of the first-ever top division professional football league in Saudi Arabia, known then as the Saudi Premier League.

== Overview ==
The league was won by Al-Hilal. Al-Riyadh, on the other hand, would be the first team to be relegated from the top flight.

== Clubs ==
=== Stadia and locations ===
Locations of teams in the 1976–77 Saudi Premier League

Club	Location	Stadium	Head coach
Al-Ahli	Jeddah	Prince Abdullah Al-Faisal Stadium	(Saudi Arabia) Ahmed Saleh Al Yafei
Al-Hilal	Riyadh	Prince Faisal bin Fahd Stadium	(England) George Smith
Al-Ittihad	Jeddah	Prince Abdullah Al-Faisal Stadium	(Tunisia) Ali Selmi
Al-Nassr	Riyadh	Prince Faisal bin Fahd Stadium	(Socialist Federal Republic of Yugoslavia) Ljubiša Broćić
Al-Qadsiah	Khobar	Prince Saud bin Jalawi Stadium	
Al-Riyadh	Riyadh	Al-Sayegh Stadium	
Al-Shabab	Riyadh	Prince Faisal bin Fahd Stadium	
Al-Wehda	Mecca	King Abdul Aziz Stadium	(Egypt) Raafat Attia

=== Foreign players ===
Club	Player 1	Former players
Al-Ahli		
Al-Hilal	(Tunisia) Ali Kaabi	(England) Eamonn O'Keefe
Al-Ittihad		
Al-Nassr		(Sudan) Ali Gagarin
Al-Qadsiah		
Al-Riyadh		
Al-Shabab		
Al-Wehda		

== League table ==
Pos	Team	Pld	Pts
1	Al-Hilal	14	20
2	Al-Nassr	14	18
3	Al-Ahli	14	16
4	Al-Ittihad	14	16
5	Al-Wehda	14	14
6	Al-Qadsiah	14	13
7	Al-Shabab	14	10
8	Al-Riyadh	14	7

Source: rsssf.com
- Full records are not known at this time

Saudi Premier League
1976–77 winners

1st title
