= 1991–92 Saudi Premier League =

Saudi Professional League
- Season: 1991–92
- Champions: Al-Shabab (2nd title)
- Relegated: Al-Nahda; Ohud
- Top goalscorer: Saeed Al-Owairan (16)

Al-Shabab won the championship again for the second time and the second time in a row after winning the end of season championship final on penalties against Al-Ettifaq.

Promoted teams Al-Nahda and Ohud were relegated.

== Stadia and locations ==
Locations of teams in the 1991–92 Saudi Premier League

Club	Location	Stadium
Al-Ahli	Jeddah	Prince Abdullah Al-Faisal Stadium
Al-Ettifaq	Dammam	Prince Mohamed bin Fahd Stadium
Al-Hilal	Riyadh	King Fahd Stadium
Al-Ittihad	Jeddah	Prince Abdullah Al-Faisal Stadium
Al-Nahda	Khobar	Prince Saud bin Jalawi Stadium
Al-Nassr	Riyadh	King Fahd Stadium
Ohud	Medina	Prince Mohammed bin Abdul Aziz Stadium
Al-Qadsiah	Al Khubar	Prince Saud bin Jalawi Stadium
Al-Riyadh	Riyadh	King Fahd Stadium
Al-Shabab	Riyadh	King Fahd Stadium
Al-Ta'ee	Ha'il	Prince Abdul Aziz bin Musa'ed Stadium
Al-Wehda	Mecca	King Abdul Aziz Stadium

== Final League table ==
Pos	Team	Pld	W	D	L	GF	GA	GD	Pts
1	Al-Ahli	22	13	5	4	30	16	+14	31
2	Al-Shabab	22	9	12	1	30	14	+16	30
3	Al-Ettifaq	22	10	8	4	28	16	+12	28
4	Al-Nassr	22	8	11	3	27	20	+7	27
5	Al-Ittihad	22	10	6	6	27	19	+8	26
6	Al-Qadsiah	22	10	5	7	30	20	+10	25
7	Al-Hilal	22	7	9	6	27	20	+7	23
8	Al-Ta'ee	22	6	8	8	23	30	−7	20
9	Al-Wahda	22	6	7	9	21	23	−2	19
10	Al-Riyadh	22	4	8	10	24	34	−10	16
11	Al-Nahda	22	2	6	14	13	40	−27	10
12	Ohud	22	1	7	14	25	53	−28	9

Promoted: Al-Najma SC, Al-Raed.

== Playoffs ==
Semifinals

14 May 1992	Al-Ettifaq	2–0	Al-Ahli	Prince Saud bin Jalawi Stadium, Khobar
	Sadoun Hamoud; Sadoun Hamoud

15 May 1992	Al-Nassr	0–0	Al-Shabab	King Fahd Stadium, Riyadh
				Referee: Omer Al Mehannah

21 May 1992	Al-Ahli	0–0	Al-Ettifaq	Prince Abdullah Al-Faisal Stadium, Jeddah

22 May 1992	Al-Shabab	3–2 (a.e.t.)	Al-Nassr	King Fahd Stadium, Riyadh
	Khalid Al-Shanif 41'; Saeed Al-Owairan 46'; Awad Al-Anazi 106'		51' Fahad Al-Bishi; 94' Fahad Al-Bishi	Referee: Mohammed Al-Suwaiyel

Final

29 May 1992	Al-Shabab	1–1 (a.e.t.) (4–2 p)	Al-Ettifaq	King Fahd Stadium, Riyadh
	Fahad Al-Mehallel 78'		Marwan Al-Shiha 91'	Referee: Mohammed Al-Sharif
	Penalties
	Khalid Al-Shanif (penalty scored); Fahad Al-Kaltham (penalty scored); Saleh Al-Daoud (penalty scored); Sulaiman Al-Nafisah (penalty scored); Khalid Al-Zaid (penalty missed)		(penalty missed) Sadoun Hamoud; (penalty scored) Sami Jasim; (penalty scored) Ahmad Khalil; (penalty missed) Hamad Al-Dubekhi

Saudi Premier League
1991–92 winners

2nd title
