= Saudi Pro League =

Saudi association football league

- Organising body: Saudi Arabian Football Federation (SAFF)
- Founded: 1957; 69 years ago: 1957–1974 (as His Majesty's League); 1974–1975 (as the Saudi Categorization League); 1975–2007 (as the Saudi Premier League); 2008–present (as the Saudi Pro League)
- Country: Saudi Arabia
- Confederation: AFC
- Number of clubs: 18
- Level on pyramid: 1
- Relegation to: Saudi First Division League
- Domestic cup(s): King's Cup; Saudi Super Cup
- International cup(s): AFC Champions League Elite; AFC Champions League Two; GFF Gulf Club Champions League; Arab Club Champions Cup
- Current champions: Al-Nassr (11th title) (2025–26)
- Most championships: Al-Hilal (21 titles)
- Most appearances: Mohamed Al-Deayea (406)
- Top scorer: Majed Abdullah (189)
- Broadcaster: Thmanyah
- Sponsor: Roshn
- Website: spl.com.sa
- Current: 2026–27 Saudi Pro League

The Saudi Pro League (SPL), also known as the Roshn Saudi League (RSL; Arabic: دوري روشن السعودي) for sponsorship reasons, is a professional association football league in Saudi Arabia and the highest level of the Saudi football league system. The league is governed by the Saudi Arabian Football Federation.

== History ==
=== Early history (1957–2022) ===
The origins of the Saudi top division date back to the establishment of the His Majesty's League in 1957, which continued until 1974. It was followed by the 1974–75 Saudi Categorization League, a transitional season before the introduction of the Saudi Premier League. The first official season of the Saudi Premier League was the 1976–77 season.

The league used a round-robin tournament format from its first season until the 1989–90 season. Following changes by the Saudi Arabian Football Federation, the league was merged with the King's Cup and the Golden Box format was introduced. The format included a final knockout stage involving the top four teams from the regular season to decide the champion.

The round-robin format returned in the 2007–08 season. The competition was renamed the Saudi Pro League in 2008, while records from previous league formats continued to be maintained separately.

The league has used several names throughout its history. For the 2018–19 and 2019–20 seasons, it was named the Prince Mohammad bin Salman League in honour of Crown Prince Mohammed bin Salman.

In 2019, the General Sports Authority (later transformed into the Ministry of Sport) launched the Sports Clubs Support Strategy to improve governance, infrastructure, and fan engagement within Saudi clubs.

In 2022, Roshn, owned by the Public Investment Fund, signed a title sponsorship agreement with the league. The competition was renamed the Roshn Saudi League from the 2022–23 season.

=== Saudi Pro League expansion (2023–present) ===
In June 2023, the Public Investment Fund acquired 75% stakes in Al-Nassr, Al-Hilal, Al-Ittihad, and Al-Ahli as part of wider development plans linked to Saudi Vision 2030.

The league attracted global attention in 2023 after Cristiano Ronaldo joined Al-Nassr. Other international players, including Neymar, Karim Benzema, Sadio Mané, and N'Golo Kanté, later joined Saudi clubs during the same period.

The privatization process continued with several clubs changing ownership. In 2025, Al-Kholood became the first Saudi football club to be fully owned by foreign investors after being sold to The Harburg Group, led by American businessman Ben Harburg.

The league's development has received international attention and criticism. Some observers have described the investments as sportswashing, while Saudi officials have presented the reforms as part of sports development and economic diversification plans.

== Sponsorship ==
Period	Sponsor	Brand
1957–1974	No sponsor	His Majesty's League
1974–1975	No sponsor	Saudi Categorization League
1975–2007	No sponsor	Saudi Premier League
2008	No sponsor	Saudi Pro League
2009–2013	Zain	Zain Pro League
2014–2017	Abdul Latif Jameel	Abdul Latif Jameel Pro League
2018–2021	No sponsor	Saudi Pro League
2022–present	Roshn	Roshn Saudi League

== Competition format ==
=== Competition ===
As of the 2025–26 Saudi Pro League

There are 18 clubs in the Saudi Pro League. During the course of a season (usually from August to May), each club plays every other club twice (a double round-robin system), once at their home stadium and once at their opponent's, for a total of 34 games. Teams receive three points for a win, one point for a draw, and no points for a loss. Teams are ranked on the league table based on points first, then head-to-head record in case of a tie, followed by goal difference.

Each club is allowed a maximum of 25 players, including up to 10 foreign players. Of these 10 foreign players, 8 can be of any age, and 2 must be under 20 years old at the time of signing. The remaining 15 players must be Saudi nationals, with a maximum of 5 players allowed to come from the youth sector if needed or wanted.

For each league game, managers can select up to 8 foreign players to be included in the matchday squad.

=== Promotion and relegation ===
A system of promotion and relegation exists between the Saudi Pro League and Saudi First Division League. The three lowest-placed teams in the Saudi Pro League are relegated to the First Division, in the first division the top two teams are promoted to the Pro League directly, a play-off system to determine the third team to be promoted alongside the two. Teams placed between third and sixth position take part in the promotion play-offs. The fifth-placed would face the fourth, while the sixth-placed team would face the third. The final would be single-legged, hosted by the higher-placed team.

== Current clubs ==
Locations of teams in the 2026–27 Saudi Pro League

=== Stadium ===
Note: Table lists in alphabetical order.

Team	Location	Stadium	Capacity
Abha	Abha	Al-Mahalah Stadium; Damac Club Stadium (Khamis Mushait)	20,000; 5,000
Al-Ahli	Jeddah	King Abdullah Sports City Stadium; Al-Faisal Stadium	60,342; 27,000
Al-Diriyah	Diriyah	SHG Arena; Al-Awwal Park	13,537; 26,004
Al-Ettifaq	Dammam	EGO Stadium	12,984
Al-Faisaly	Harmah	Al-Majma'ah Sports City Stadium (Al-Majma'ah)	7,000
Al-Fateh	Al-Mubarraz	Maydan Tamweel Aloula	11,851
Al-Fayha	Majmaah	Majmaah Sports City Stadium	6,843
Al-Hazem	Ar Rass	Al-Hazem Club Stadium	5,100
Al-Hilal	Riyadh	Kingdom Arena	26,090
Al-Ittihad	Jeddah	King Abdullah Sports City Stadium; Al-Faisal Stadium	60,342; 27,000
Al-Khaleej	Saihat	Prince Mohamed bin Fahd Stadium (Dammam)	22,042
Al-Kholood	Ar Rass	Al-Hazem Club Stadium	5,100
Al-Nassr	Riyadh	Al-Awwal Park	26,004
Al-Qadsiah	Khobar	Prince Mohamed bin Fahd Stadium (Dammam)	22,042
Al-Riyadh	Riyadh	SHG Arena	13,537
Al-Shabab	Riyadh	SHG Arena	13,537
Al-Taawoun	Buraidah	King Abdullah Sports City Stadium Buraidah; Al-Taawoun Stadium	30,180; 5,624
Neom	Tabuk	King Khalid Sport City Stadium	12,000

=== Personnel and kits ===
Team	Manager	Captain	Kit manufacturer	Main sponsor	Other sponsors
Abha	(Croatia) Damir Burić	(Saudi Arabia) Zakaria Sami	Offside	Yelo	
Al-Ahli	(Bosnia and Herzegovina) Marino Pušić	(Senegal) Édouard Mendy	Adidas	Red Sea Global	List: Front: Saudi Investment Recycling Company, Neoleap; Back: Kayanee, Cenomi; Sleeves: None; Shorts: None
Al-Diriyah	(Portugal) Bruno Lage	(Saudi Arabia) Waleed Abdullah	Macron	Yelo, Rassin	
Al-Ettifaq	(Australia) Arthur Papas	TBA	Jako	Kammelna	List: Front: Aldyar Alarabiya, Tameeni Insurance; Back: Mouwasat Hospital, Xplere, Enterprise Rent-A-Car; Sleeves: Saudi Qaid Transport Company; Shorts: None
Al-Fateh	(Saudi Arabia) Khaled Al-Atwi	(Saudi Arabia) Mohammed Al-Fuhaid	Offside	None	List: Front: Fuchsia Bakery, Tameeni Insurance; Back: Tamweel Aloula, Dallah Hospitals; Sleeves: Orinex, Freshly Kitchen; Shorts: None
Al-Faisaly	(Italy) Giovanni Solinas	(Saudi Arabia) Yassin Barnawi	Adidas	Aldrees, Yelo	
Al-Fayha	(Brazil) Fábio Carille	(Saudi Arabia) Sami Al-Khaibari	HH Sports	Basic Electronics Company	List: Front: Tameeni Insurance; Back: Al Romaih Investment; Sleeves: Morabaha Marina Financing Company; Shorts: None
Al-Hazem	(Tunisia) Jalel Kadri	(Saudi Arabia) Abdulrahman Al-Dakheel	Hattrick	Yelo	
Al-Hilal	(Italy) Simone Inzaghi	(Saudi Arabia) Salem Al-Dawsari	Puma	NHC Innovation	List: Front: Flynas; Back: Riyad Bank; Sleeves: Tree Digital Insurance Agency; Shorts: None
Al-Ittihad	(Germany) Jens Wissing	(Portugal) Danilo Pereira	Nike	None	List: Front: Flow Progressive Logistics; Back: None; Sleeves: TCL; Shorts: None
Al-Khaleej	(Portugal) José Gomes	(Saudi Arabia) Mohammed Al-Khabrani	Laser	Yelo Rent a Car	List: Front: Fisher Electronics, Tameeni Insurance, Almana Hospital; Back: Shemagh Al Bassam, Florina Shoes, Candy; Sleeves: Locate Food Delivery App, Saudi Qaid Transport Company; Shorts: Sayyar
Al-Kholood	(England) Des Buckingham	(Suriname) Shaquille Pinas	Kappa	Yelo Rent a Car	List: Front: Tameeni Insurance; Back: Mezaj Maghribhi, Florina Shoes, Elba Cookers; Sleeves: Saudi Qaid Transport Company; Shorts: None
Al-Nassr	(Australia) Ange Postecoglou	(Portugal) Cristiano Ronaldo	Adidas	Humain	List: Front: Gathern; Back: None; Sleeves: AROYA Cruises; Shorts: None
Al-Qadsiah	(Northern Ireland) Brendan Rodgers	(Spain) Nacho	Adidas	Aloula Aviation	List: Front: BesteBit; Back: iz, Zoho Corporation, Sixt; Sleeves: Dar wa Emaar; Shorts: Batook Nova
Al-Riyadh	(Brazil) Maurício Dulac	(Canada) Milan Borjan	Black Panther	Science Technology	List: Front: Tameeni Insurance; Back: Stars Smile; Sleeves: None; Shorts: None
Al-Shabab	(Germany) Thomas Letsch	(Belgium) Yannick Carrasco	Offside	Jetour	List: Front: Theeb Rent A Car, Tameeni Insurance; Back: Mezaj Maghribi; Sleeves: Direct for Travel & Tourism; Shorts: None
Al-Taawoun	(Serbia) Žarko Lazetić	(Netherlands) Aschraf El Mahdioui	Macron	Aldyar Alarabiya	List: Front: Gree Electric, Dr Tooth Clinics; Back: Al Dahayan Aluminum Panel Factory, Al Saif Trading Agencies; Sleeves: Direct KSA, Duvet Mattresses; Shorts: None
Neom	(France) Christophe Galtier	TBA	Adidas	Oxagon	List: Front: SHG; Back: None; Sleeves: None; Shorts: None

== Champions ==
=== List of champions ===
No	Season	Champion	Runners-up
His Majesty's League 1957–1974
1	1957–58	Al-Wehda	Al-Ittihad
2	1958–59	Al-Ittihad	Al-Wehda
3	1959–60	Al-Ittihad	Al-Wehda
4	1960–61	Al-Ittihad	Al-Wehda
5	1961–62	Al-Hilal	Al-Wehda
6	1962–63	Al-Ahli	Al-Riyadh
7	1963–64	Al-Ittihad	Al-Hilal
8	1964–65	Al-Hilal	Al-Ittihad
9	1965–66	Al-Ahli	Al-Ettifaq
10	1966–67	Not completed	
11	1967–68	Not held	
12	1968–69	Al-Ahli	Al-Ettifaq
13	1969–70	Cancelled	
14	1970–71	Al-Ahli	Al-Wehda
15	1971–72	Al-Ahli	Al-Nassr
16	1972–73	Al-Ahli	Al-Nassr
17	1973–74	Al-Nassr	Al-Ahli
Saudi Categorization League 1974–1975
18	1974–75	Al-Nassr	Al-Hilal
Saudi Premier League 1975–2007
19	1975–76	Cancelled	
20	1976–77	Al-Hilal	Al-Nassr
21	1977–78	Al-Ahli	Al-Nassr
22	1978–79	Al-Hilal	Al-Nassr
23	1979–80	Al-Nassr	Al-Hilal
24	1980–81	Al-Nassr	Al-Hilal
25	1981–82	Al-Ittihad	Al-Shabab
26	1982–83	Al-Ettifaq	Al-Hilal
27	1983–84	Al-Ahli	Al-Ittihad
28	1984–85	Al-Hilal	Al-Shabab
29	1985–86	Al-Hilal	Al-Ittihad
30	1986–87	Al-Ettifaq	Al-Hilal
31	1987–88	Al-Hilal	Al-Ettifaq
32	1988–89	Al-Nassr	Al-Shabab
33	1989–90	Al-Hilal	Al-Ahli
34	1990–91	Al-Shabab	Al-Nassr
35	1991–92	Al-Shabab	Al-Ettifaq
36	1992–93	Al-Shabab	Al-Hilal
37	1993–94	Al-Nassr	Al-Riyadh
38	1994–95	Al-Nassr	Al-Hilal
39	1995–96	Al-Hilal	Al-Ahli
40	1996–97	Al-Ittihad	Al-Hilal
41	1997–98	Al-Hilal	Al-Shabab
42	1998–99	Al-Ittihad	Al-Ahli
43	1999–2000	Al-Ittihad	Al-Ahli
44	2000–01	Al-Ittihad	Al-Nassr
45	2001–02	Al-Hilal	Al-Ittihad
46	2002–03	Al-Ittihad	Al-Ahli
47	2003–04	Al-Shabab	Al-Ittihad
48	2004–05	Al-Hilal	Al-Shabab
49	2005–06	Al-Shabab	Al-Hilal
50	2006–07	Al-Ittihad	Al-Hilal
Saudi Pro League 2008–present
51	2007–08	Al-Hilal	Al-Ittihad
52	2008–09	Al-Ittihad	Al-Hilal
53	2009–10	Al-Hilal	Al-Ittihad
54	2010–11	Al-Hilal	Al-Ittihad
55	2011–12	Al-Shabab	Al-Ahli
56	2012–13	Al-Fateh	Al-Hilal
57	2013–14	Al-Nassr	Al-Hilal
58	2014–15	Al-Nassr	Al-Ahli
59	2015–16	Al-Ahli	Al-Hilal
60	2016–17	Al-Hilal	Al-Ahli
61	2017–18	Al-Hilal	Al-Ahli
62	2018–19	Al-Nassr	Al-Hilal
63	2019–20	Al-Hilal	Al-Nassr
64	2020–21	Al-Hilal	Al-Shabab
65	2021–22	Al-Hilal	Al-Ittihad
66	2022–23	Al-Ittihad	Al-Nassr
67	2023–24	Al-Hilal	Al-Nassr
68	2024–25	Al-Ittihad	Al-Hilal
69	2025–26	Al-Nassr	Al-Hilal

== League championship records ==
=== Titles by club ===
#	Club	Titles	Runners-up
1	Al-Hilal	21	18
2	Al-Ittihad	14	10
3	Al-Nassr	11	10
4	Al-Ahli	9	10
5	Al-Shabab	6	6
6	Al-Ettifaq	2	4
7	Al-Wehda	1	5
8	Al-Fateh	1	0
9	Al-Riyadh	0	2

=== Titles by city ===
Province	City	Titles	Clubs
Riyadh Province	Riyadh	38	Al-Hilal (21), Al-Nassr (11), Al-Shabab (6)
Mecca Province	Jeddah	23	Al-Ittihad (14), Al-Ahli (9)
Eastern Province	Dammam	2	Al-Ettifaq (2)
Eastern Province	Al-Mubarraz	1	Al-Fateh (1)
Mecca Province	Mecca	1	Al-Wehda (1)

=== Titles by competition era ===
Competition	Champions
Pro League	Al-Hilal (9), Al-Nassr (4), Al-Ittihad (3), Al-Fateh (1), Al-Ahli (1), Al-Shabab (1)
Premier League	Al-Hilal (10), Al-Ittihad (7), Al-Nassr (5), Al-Shabab (5), Al-Ettifaq (2), Al-Ahli (2)
Categorization League	Al-Nassr (1)
His Majesty's League	Al-Ahli (6), Al-Ittihad (4), Al-Hilal (2), Al-Wehda (1), Al-Nassr (1)

== Saudi clubs in Asia ==
Saudi Arabian clubs have won 17 continental titles in AFC competitions. The table below lists their achievements.

Club	AFC Champions League Elite	Asian Cup Winners' Cup	Asian Super Cup	Total
Al-Hilal	4 (1991, 2000, 2019, 2021)	2 (1997, 2002)	2 (1997, 2000)	8
Al-Ittihad	2 (2004, 2005)	1 (1999)	—	3
Al-Ahli	2 (2025, 2026)	—	—	2
Al-Nassr	—	1 (1998)	1 (1998)	2
Al-Shabab	—	1 (2001)	—	1
Al-Qadsiah	—	1 (1994)	—	1
Total	8	6	3	17

== Top scorers ==
=== All-time top scorers ===
As of 24 October 2026 during the 2026–27 Saudi Pro League

- **Bold** indicates a player still active in the Pro League.
- Note: This count includes only seasons from the inception of the Saudi Categorization League to the present day.

Rank	Player	Goals	Apps	Ratio	First	Last	Club(s)
1	(Saudi Arabia) Majed Abdullah	189	194	0.97	1977	1997	Al-Nassr
2	(Saudi Arabia) Nasser Al-Shamrani	166	301	0.55	2003	2019	Al-Wehda, Al-Shabab, Al-Hilal, Al-Ittihad
3	(Syria) Omar Al Somah	161	222	0.73	2014	2026	Al-Ahli, Al-Orobah, Al-Hazem
4	(Morocco) **Abderrazak Hamdallah**	159	186	0.85	2018	2026	Al-Nassr, Al-Ittihad, Al-Shabab, **Al-Taawoun**
5	(Saudi Arabia) Fahd Al-Hamdan	120	252	0.48	1984	2000	Al-Riyadh
6	(Saudi Arabia) Yasser Al-Qahtani	112	206	0.54	2000	2018	Al-Qadsiah, Al-Hilal
7	(Saudi Arabia) Mohammad Al-Sahlawi	111	257	0.43	2005	2022	Al-Qadsiah, Al-Nassr, Al-Shabab, Al-Taawoun
8	(Portugal) **Cristiano Ronaldo**	110	117	0.94	2023	2026	**Al-Nassr**
9	(Saudi Arabia) Sami Al-Jaber	101	268	0.38	1988	2007	Al-Hilal
10	(Saudi Arabia) Hamzah Idris	96	–	–	1992	2007	Ohod, Al-Ittihad

=== Top scorers by season ===
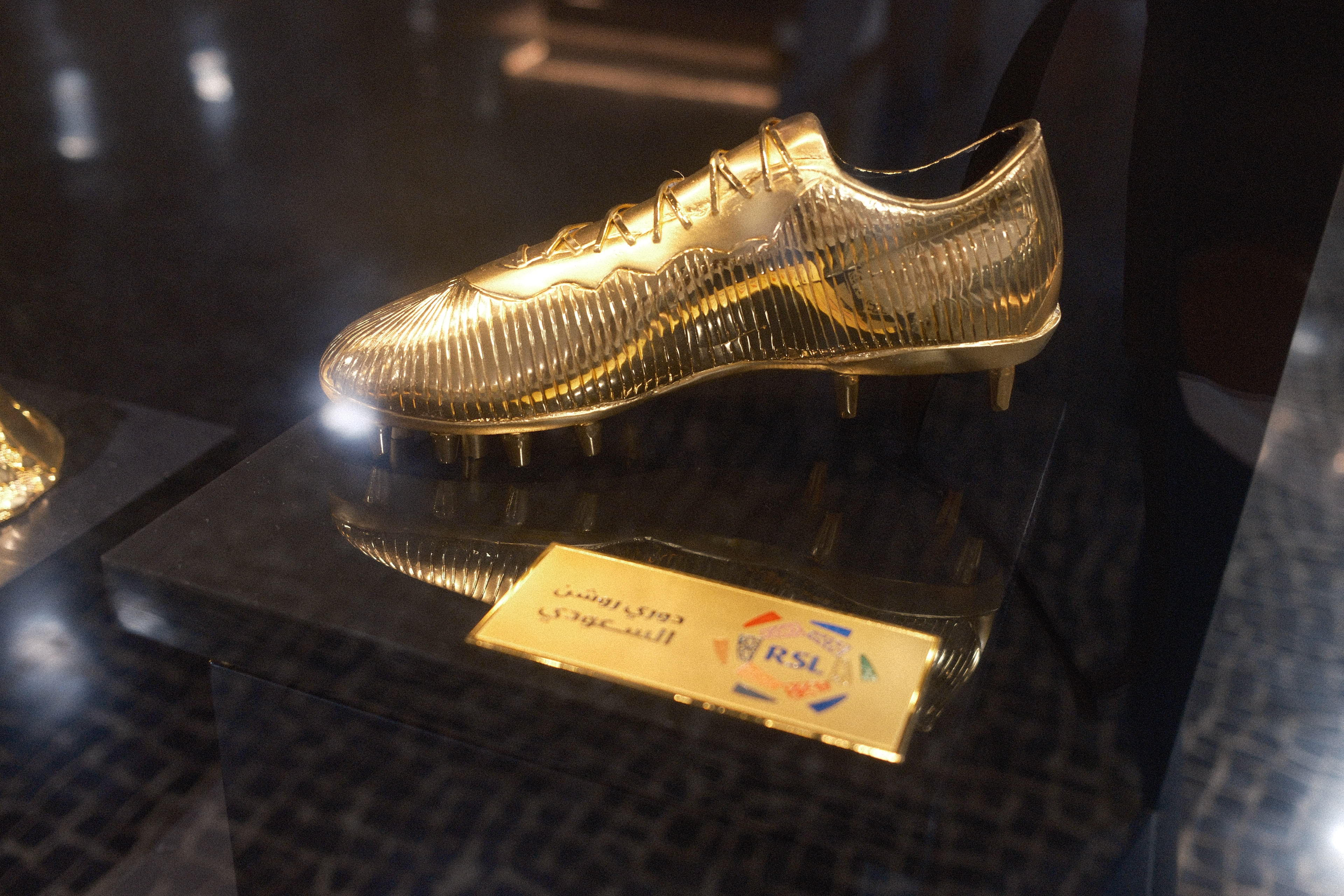
Saudi Pro League Golden Boot in the Museu CR7

Season	**Nat.**	**Top scorer(s)**	**Club(s)**	**Goals**
1974–75	(Saudi Arabia)	Mohammad S. Abdeli	Al-Nassr	13
1976–77	(Saudi Arabia)	Nasser Eid	Al-Qadsiah	7
1977–78	(Saudi Arabia)	Motamad Khojali	Al-Ahli	14
1978–79	(Saudi Arabia)	Majed Abdullah	Al-Nassr	18
1979–80	(Saudi Arabia)	Majed Abdullah	Al-Nassr	17
1980–81	(Saudi Arabia)	Majed Abdullah	Al-Nassr	21
1981–82	(Saudi Arabia)	Khalid Al-Ma'ajil	Al-Shabab	22
1982–83	(Saudi Arabia)	Majed Abdullah	Al-Nassr	14
1983–84	(Saudi Arabia)	Hussam Abu Dawood	Al-Ahli	14
1984–85	(Saudi Arabia)	Hathal Al-Dosari	Al-Hilal	15
1985–86	(Saudi Arabia)	Majed Abdullah	Al-Nassr	15
1986–87	(Saudi Arabia)	Mohammad Suwaidi	Al-Ittihad	17
1987–88	(Saudi Arabia)	Khalid Al-Ma'ajil	Al-Shabab	12
1988–89	(Saudi Arabia)	Majed Abdullah	Al-Nassr	19
1989–90	(Saudi Arabia)	Sami Al-Jaber	Al-Hilal	16
1990–91	(Saudi Arabia)	Fahd Al-Mehallel	Al-Shabab	20
1991–92	(Saudi Arabia)	Saeed Al-Owairan	Al-Shabab	16
1992–93	(Saudi Arabia)	Sami Al-Jaber	Al-Hilal	18
1993–94	(Senegal)	Moussa N'Daw	Al-Hilal	15
1994–95	(Saudi Arabia)	Fahd Al-Hamdan	Al-Riyadh	15
1995–96	(Ghana)	Ohene Kennedy	Al-Nassr	14
1996–97	(Morocco)	Ahmed Bahja	Al-Ittihad	21
1997–98	(Saudi Arabia)	Sulaiman Al-Hadaithy	Al-Najma	15
1998–99	(Saudi Arabia)	Obeid Al-Dosari	Al-Wehda	20
1999–00	(Saudi Arabia)	Hamzah Idris	Al-Ittihad	33
2000–01	(Angola)	Paulo Silva	Al-Ettifaq	13
2001–02	(Brazil)	Sérgio Ricardo	Al-Ittihad	16
2002–03	(Ecuador)	Carlos Tenorio	Al-Nassr	15
2003–04	(Ghana) (Ivory Coast)	Godwin Attram; Kandia Traoré	Al-Shabab; Al-Hilal	15
2004–05	(Senegal)	Mohammed Manga	Al-Shabab	15
2005–06	(Saudi Arabia)	Essa Al-Mehyani	Al-Wehda	16
2006–07	(Ghana)	Godwin Attram	Al-Shabab	13
2007–08	(Saudi Arabia)	Nasser Al-Shamrani	Al-Shabab	18
2008–09	(Morocco) (Saudi Arabia)	Hicham Aboucherouane; Nasser Al-Shamrani	Al-Ittihad; Al-Shabab	12
2009–10	(Saudi Arabia)	Mohammad Al-Shalhoub	Al-Hilal	12
2010–11	(Saudi Arabia)	Nasser Al-Shamrani	Al-Shabab	17
2011–12	(Brazil) (Saudi Arabia)	Victor Simões; Nasser Al-Shamrani	Al-Ahli; Al-Shabab	21
2012–13	(United Arab Emirates)	Sebastián Tagliabúe	Al-Shabab	19
2013–14	(Saudi Arabia)	Nasser Al-Shamrani	Al-Hilal	21
2014–15	(Syria)	Omar Al Somah	Al-Ahli	22
2015–16	(Syria)	Omar Al Somah	Al-Ahli	27
2016–17	(Syria)	Omar Al Somah	Al-Ahli	24
2017–18	(Chile)	Ronnie Fernández	Al-Fayha	13
2018–19	(Morocco)	Abderrazak Hamdallah	Al-Nassr	34
2019–20	(Morocco)	Abderrazak Hamdallah	Al-Nassr	29
2020–21	(France)	Bafétimbi Gomis	Al-Hilal	24
2021–22	(Nigeria)	Odion Ighalo	Al-Hilal	24
2022–23	(Morocco)	Abderrazak Hamdallah	Al-Ittihad	21
2023–24	(Portugal)	Cristiano Ronaldo	Al-Nassr	**35**
2024–25	(Portugal)	Cristiano Ronaldo	Al-Nassr	25
2025–26	(Mexico)	Julián Quiñones	Al-Qadsiah	33

- Record

== Awards ==
At the end of each season, individual awards are presented to players and managers in recognition of their performances.

Season	Manager of the Season	Player of the Season	Saudi Player of the Season	Best young player	Best Goalkeeper	Top Scorer	Goal of the Season
2018–19	(Portugal) Pedro Emanuel	(Morocco) Abderrazak Hamdallah	(Saudi Arabia) Mohamed Kanno	(Saudi Arabia) Muteb Al-Mufarrij	(Tunisia) Farouk Ben Mustapha	(Morocco) Abderrazak Hamdallah	Not awarded
2023–24	(Portugal) Jorge Jesus	Not awarded			(Morocco) Yassine Bounou	(Portugal) Cristiano Ronaldo	Not awarded
2024–25	(France) Laurent Blanc	(France) Karim Benzema	(Saudi Arabia) Salem Al-Dawsari	(Saudi Arabia) Musab Al-Juwayr	(Belgium) Koen Casteels	(Portugal) Cristiano Ronaldo	(Portugal) Cristiano Ronaldo
2025–26	(Portugal) Jorge Jesus	(Portugal) João Félix	(Saudi Arabia) Musab Al-Juwayr	(Saudi Arabia) Abdulaziz Al-Aliwa	(Senegal) Édouard Mendy	(Mexico) Julián Quiñones	(Portugal) Cristiano Ronaldo

== Broadcasters ==
Country	Broadcaster	Ref.
Middle East and North Africa	Thmanyah	
Afghanistan	SolhSport BEGIN	
Pakistan	SolhSport BEGIN	
Albania	SuperSport	
Kosovo	SuperSport	
Armenia	Setanta Sports	
Azerbaijan	Setanta Sports	
Estonia	Setanta Sports	
Georgia	Setanta Sports	
Kazakhstan	Setanta Sports	
Kyrgyzstan	Setanta Sports	
Latvia	Setanta Sports	
Lithuania	Setanta Sports	
Moldova	Setanta Sports	
Tajikistan	Setanta Sports	
Turkmenistan	Setanta Sports	
Ukraine	Setanta Sports	
Uzbekistan	Setanta Sports	
Austria	Sportdigital	
Germany	Sportdigital	
Switzerland	Sportdigital	
Bangladesh	FanCode	
India	FanCode	
Nepal	FanCode	
Sri Lanka	FanCode	
Brazil	Grupo Globo	
Brazil	Canal GOAT	
Brazil	Grupo Bandeirantes	
Bulgaria	Max Sport	
Caribbean	Fox Sports	
Latin America (exc. Brazil)	Fox Sports	
United States	Fox Sports	
China	Star Sports	
China	Qiukedao	
China	TikTok	
China	Zhibo8	
Croatia	Sport Klub	
Slovenia	Sport Klub	
Czech Republic	Strike TV	
Slovakia	Strike TV	
France	ZackNani	
Greece	Cosmote Sport	
Hungary	Spíler TV	
Italy	Como TV	
Italy	Sportitalia	
Japan	SPOTV	
Mongolia	SPOTV	
Southeast Asia	SPOTV	
Taiwan	SPOTV	
Netherlands	Talpa	
Poland	Polsat Sport 1	
Portugal	Sport TV	
Romania	Prima Sport	
Russia	Okko	
Sub-Saharan Africa	StarTimes Sports	
Sub-Saharan Africa	ESPN	
Sub-Saharan Africa	SportyTV	
Sub-Saharan Africa	New World TV	
Sub-Saharan Africa	ZAP	
Sub-Saharan Africa	Azam TV	
Spain	Movistar Plus+	
Turkey	S Sport	
Turkey	TV8.5	

== See also ==
- King's Cup
- Saudi Super Cup
- Crown Prince Cup
- Saudi Founder's Cup
- Sport in Saudi Arabia
- Football in Saudi Arabia
- Prince Faisal bin Fahd Cup
- Saudi Women's Premier League
- Saudi Arabian Football Federation
- List of Saudi Pro League hat-tricks
- List of football clubs in Saudi Arabia
- List of football stadiums in Saudi Arabia
