= 1981–82 Saudi Premier League =

Saudi Premier League
- Season: 1981–82
- Champions: Al-Ittihad (1st title)
- Relegated: Al-Kawkab; Al-Riyadh; Al-Wehda; Al-Khaleej; Okaz; Al-Tai; Al-Ansar; Al-Jabalain; Damac; Al-Taawoun
- Top goalscorer: Khalid Al-Ma'ajil (22 goals)

The 1981–82 season of the Saudi Premier League, also known as the Joint League, saw the merger of both the Saudi Premier League and the Saudi First Division League in relation to the 1982 FIFA World Cup qualification process.

== Overview ==
Twenty teams were divided into two groups, A and B.

The top two in each group would enter a semi-final phase to determine the overall champions.

The top five from each group would also create the makeup for the next season's Premier League ten clubs, while the bottom five on the other hand would be entered into the Saudi First Division League.

== Clubs ==
=== Stadia and locations ===
Locations of teams in the 1981-82 Saudi Premier League

Club	Location	Stadium	Head coach
Al-Ahli	Jeddah	Prince Abdullah Al-Faisal Stadium	(Brazil) Jorge Vieira
Al-Ansar	Medina	Prince Mohammed bin Abdul Aziz Stadium	
Al-Ettifaq	Dammam	Prince Mohamed bin Fahd Stadium	(Saudi Arabia) Khalil Al-Zayani
Al-Hilal	Riyadh	King Fahd Stadium	(Brazil) Olten Filho
Al-Ittihad	Jeddah	Prince Abdullah Al-Faisal Stadium	(Brazil) Chinesinho
Al-Jabalain	Ha'il	Prince Abdul Aziz bin Musa'ed Stadium	
Al-Kawkab	Al-Kharj	Ordnance Factories Stadium	
Al-Khaleej	Saihat	Al-Khaleej Club Stadium	
Al-Nahda	Khobar	Prince Saud bin Jalawi Stadium	
Al-Nassr	Riyadh	King Fahd Stadium	(Brazil) Chico Formiga
Al-Qadsiah	Khobar	Prince Saud bin Jalawi Stadium	
Al-Rawdah	Riyadh	Prince Faisal bin Fahd Stadium	
Al-Riyadh	Riyadh	Prince Faisal bin Fahd Stadium	
Al-Shabab	Riyadh	King Fahd Stadium	
Al-Tai	Ha'il	Prince Abdul Aziz bin Musa'ed Stadium	
Al-Taawoun	Buraidah	King Abdullah Sport City Stadium	
Al-Wehda	Mecca	King Abdul Aziz Stadium	(Egypt) Taha Ismail
Damac	Riyadh	Prince Faisal bin Fahd Stadium	(Sudan) Azzedine Abbas
Ohod	Medina	Education Stadium	(Tunisia) Hameur Hizem
Okaz	Taif	Okaz Club Stadium	

=== Foreign players ===
Club	Player 1	Player 2	Former players
Al-Ahli	(Tunisia) Mohsen Labidi		
Al-Ansar			
Al-Ettifaq			
Al-Hilal	(Tunisia) Ali Kaabi		
Al-Ittihad	(Tunisia) Témime Lahzami		
Al-Jabalain			
Al-Kawkab			
Al-Khaleej			
Al-Nahda			
Al-Nassr	(Brazil) Aílton Lira	(Tunisia) Abderraouf Ben Aziza	
Al-Qadsiah			
Al-Rawdah			
Al-Riyadh			
Al-Shabab			
Al-Tai			
Al-Taawoun			
Al-Wehda			
Damac			
Ohod	(Tunisia) Habib Majeri		
Okaz			

== League table ==
=== Group A ===
Pos	Team	Pld	Pts
1	Al-Shabab	18	28
2	Al-Nassr	18	27
3	Al-Ettifaq	18	26
4	Ohod	18	22
5	Al-Qadsiah	18	18
6	Al-Kawkab	18	17
7	Al-Riyadh	18	15
8	Al-Wehda	18	15
9	Al-Khaleej	18	10
10	Okaz	18	2

Source: rsssf.com

=== Group B ===
Pos	Team	Pld	Pts
1	Al-Ittihad	18	29
2	Al-Hilal	18	24
3	Al-Nahda	18	24
4	Al-Ahli	18	21
5	Al-Rawdah	18	19
6	Al-Tai	18	18
7	Al-Ansar	18	15
8	Al-Jabalain	18	11
9	Damac	18	11
10	Al-Taawoun	18	8

Source: rsssf.com

== Playoffs ==
=== Semifinals ===
Al-Ittihad	1–0 (a.e.t.)	Al-Nassr

Al-Shabab	2–0 (a.e.t.)	Al-Hilal

=== Third place match ===
Al-Nassr	1–3 (a.e.t.)	Al-Hilal

=== Final ===
5 February 1982	Al-Shabab	0–1 (a.e.t.)	Al-Ittihad
			Saeed Ghorab

Saudi Premier League
1981–82 winners

1st title
