= 1984–85 Saudi Premier League =

Saudi Premier League
- Season: 1984–85
- Champions: Al-Hilal
- Relegated: Al-Jabalain; Ohod
- Top goalscorer: Hathal Al-Dosari (15 goals)

1984 saw the 9th season in Saudi Arabian top-flight football. Al-Hilal won the title for the 3rd time and the first since 1979.

The league was also expanded to feature 12 teams, with no relegation from the season before.

Newly promoted sides Ohod and Al-Jabalain went straight back down.

== Stadia and locations ==
Locations of teams in the 1984-85 Saudi Premier League

Club	Location	Stadium
Al-Ahli	Jeddah	Prince Abdullah Al-Faisal Stadium
Al-Ettifaq	Dammam	Prince Mohamed bin Fahd Stadium
Al-Hilal	Riyadh	King Fahd Stadium
Al-Ittihad	Jeddah	Prince Abdullah Al-Faisal Stadium
Al-Jabalain	Ha'il	Prince Abdul Aziz bin Musa'ed Stadium
Al-Nahda	Khobar	Prince Saud bin Jalawi Stadium
Al-Nassr	Riyadh	King Fahd Stadium
Ohod	Medina	
Al-Qadsiah	Khobar	Prince Saud bin Jalawi Stadium
Al-Riyadh	Riyadh	Prince Faisal bin Fahd Stadium
Al-Shabab	Riyadh	King Fahd Stadium
Al-Wehda	Mecca	King Abdul Aziz Stadium

== League table ==
Pos	Team	Pld	Pts
1	Al-Hilal	22	37
2	Al-Shabab	22	34
3	Al-Ahli	22	29
4	Al-Ettifaq	22	29
5	Al-Nassr	22	25
6	Al-Ittihad	22	22
7	Al-Riyadh	22	19
8	Al-Qadsiah	22	19
9	Al-Nahda	22	18
10	Al-Wehda	22	14
11	Al-Jabalain	22	11
12	Ohod	22	7

Source: rsssf.com
- Promoted: Al-Tai, Al-Kawkab.
- Full records are not known at this time

== Champions ==
Saudi Premier League
1984-85 winners
Al-Hilal
3rd title
