= Jorge Luís (footballer, born 1958) =

Brazilian footballer

Personal information
- Full name: Jorge Luís Brochado Pereira
- Date of birth: 14 March 1958
- Place of birth: Barra Mansa, Brazil
- Date of death: 15 July 2024 (aged 66)
- Place of death: Barra Mansa, Brazil
- Position: Midfielder

Youth career
- 1972–1976: Flamengo

Senior career*
Years	Team	Apps	(Gls)
1976–1978	Flamengo	27	(1)
1978	Cruzeiro		
1979	Al Nassr		
1980–1981	Joinville		
1981	Guarani		
1982–1984	Atlético Paranaense		
1984	Joinville		
1985	Portuguesa		
1985	Londrina		
1986	Pinheiros-PR		

International career
1977	Brazil U20	5	(1)
- * Club domestic league appearances and goals as of 29 June 2024

Jorge Luís Brochado Pereira (14 March 1958 – 15 July 2024), simply known as Jorge Luís, was a Brazilian professional footballer who played as a midfielder.

== Career ==
A graduate of Flamengo's youth teams, Jorge Luís was notable for being the captain of the Brazil national under-20 football team in the 1977 FIFA World Youth Championship. He was also part of the champion squads for Flamengo in 1978, and later for Joinville and Athletico Paranaense in the 1980s.

== Honours ==
Flamengo

- Campeonato Carioca: 1978
- Taça Guanabara: 1978

Joinville

- Campeonato Catarinense: 1981

Athletico Paranaense

- Campeonato Paranaense: 1982, 1983

== Death ==
Jorge Luís died at the age of 66 in his hometown, Barra Mansa, on 15 July 2024.
