= Awad Al-Anazi =

Saudi Arabian footballer

Personal information
- Date of birth: 24 September 1968 (age 58)
- Place of birth: Saudi Arabia
- Height: 1.76 m (5 ft 9 in)
- Position: Defender

Senior career*
Years	Team	Apps	(Gls)
- Al-Shabab Riyadh

International career
- Saudi Arabia
- * Club domestic league appearances and goals

Awad Al-Anazi (born 24 September 1968) is a Saudi Arabian football defender who played for Saudi Arabia in the 1994 FIFA World Cup. He also played for Al-Shabab Riyadh.
