= 1989–90 Saudi Premier League =

Premier League
- Season: 1989–90
- Champions: Al-Hilal (6th title)
- Relegated: Al-Raed; Al-Nahda
- Top goalscorer: Sami Al-Jaber (16 goals)

Al-Hilal won the championship for the 6th time in 1990.

Newly promoted Al-Raed carried on the Saudi tradition by getting relegated in their first season along with Al-Nahda who were relegated for the first time since the 1977–78 season.

== Stadia and locations ==
Locations of teams in the 1989-90 Saudi Premier League

| Club | Location | Stadium |
|---|---|---|
| Al-Ahli | Jeddah | Prince Abdullah Al-Faisal Stadium |
| Al-Ettifaq | Dammam | Prince Mohamed bin Fahd Stadium |
| Al-Hilal | Riyadh | King Fahd Stadium |
| Al-Ittihad | Jeddah | Prince Abdullah Al-Faisal Stadium |
| Al-Nahda | Khobar | Prince Saud bin Jalawi Stadium |
| Al-Nassr | Riyadh | King Fahd Stadium |
| Al-Qadsiah | Al Khubar | Prince Saud bin Jalawi Stadium |
| Al-Riyadh | Riyadh | King Fahd Stadium |
| Al-Shabab | Riyadh | King Fahd Stadium |
| Al-Ta'ee | Ha'il | Prince Abdul Aziz bin Musa'ed Stadium |
| Al-Wehda | Mecca | King Abdul Aziz Stadium |
| Al-Raed | Buraydah | King Abdullah Sport City Stadium |

== Final league table ==
| Pos | Team | Pld | W | D | L | GF | GA | GD | Pts |
|---|---|---|---|---|---|---|---|---|---|
| 1 | Al-Hilal | 22 | 15 | 4 | 3 | 33 | 7 | +26 | 34 |
| 2 | Al-Ahli | 22 | 13 | 6 | 3 | 32 | 14 | +18 | 32 |
| 3 | Al-Nassr | 22 | 10 | 6 | 6 | 29 | 18 | +11 | 26 |
| 4 | Al-Ta'ee | 22 | 9 | 7 | 6 | 19 | 13 | +6 | 25 |
| 5 | Al-Shabab | 22 | 7 | 11 | 4 | 26 | 21 | +5 | 25 |
| 6 | Al-Qadsiah | 22 | 9 | 6 | 7 | 20 | 15 | +5 | 24 |
| 7 | Al-Ettifaq | 22 | 5 | 10 | 7 | 16 | 16 | 0 | 20 |
| 8 | Al-Ittihad | 22 | 6 | 8 | 8 | 17 | 20 | −3 | 20 |
| 9 | Al-Wehda | 22 | 3 | 12 | 7 | 18 | 23 | −5 | 18 |
| 10 | Al-Riyadh | 22 | 6 | 6 | 10 | 24 | 34 | −10 | 18 |
| 11 | Al-Nahda | 22 | 2 | 7 | 13 | 10 | 36 | −26 | 11 |
| 12 | Al-Raed | 22 | 1 | 9 | 12 | 8 | 35 | −27 | 11 |

Source: rsssf.com

Al-Najma and Al-Arabi were promoted.

Saudi Premier League
1989–90 winners
Al-Hilal
6th title
