= King Abdulaziz Sports City Stadium =

Multi-purpose stadium in Mecca, Saudi Arabia

- Ash-Sharaʼiʽ Stadium
- Interactive map of King Abdulaziz Sports City Stadium
- Location: Mecca, Saudi Arabia
- Coordinates: 21.485528°N 39.973744°E
- Owner: Ministry of Sport
- Capacity: 27,672

Construction
- Opened: 1986

Tenant
- Al-Wehda

The King Abdulaziz Sports City (Arabic: مدينة الملك عبدالعزيز الرياضية) is a multi-purpose stadium in Mecca, Saudi Arabia, the holy capital. It is the largest stadium in Mecca and is used mainly for football matches. The stadium holds 38,000 people, and is the home ground of Al-Wehda. The stadium was used temporarily by Jeddah clubs Al-Ittihad and Al-Ahli during the construction of stadiums in Jeddah, on account of the Mecca-based stadium's proximity to Jeddah.

== See also ==
- List of football stadiums in Saudi Arabia
