= Prince Saud bin Jalawi Sports City Stadium =

Stadium in Saudi Arabia

Coordinates: 26.3699°N 50.2052°E

- Bin Jalawi Stadium
- Interactive map of Prince Saud bin Jalawi Sports City Stadium
- Address: Khobar
- Location: Khobar, Saudi Arabia
- Owner: Ministry of Sport
- Capacity: 20,000

Construction
- Opened: 1983

Tenants
- Al-Qadsiah (1983–present)

The Prince Saud bin Jalawi Sports City is a multi-purpose stadium in Khobar, Saudi Arabia. It opened in 1983. The venue is used for multiple sports, but mostly for football. It is the home stadium of Al-Qadsiah.

== History ==
In February 2023, the "Saudi 2027" committee responsible for the Saudi bid to host the 2027 AFC Asian Cup listed Prince Saud bin Jalawi Sports City Stadium as a stadium to upgrade for the tournament. The stadium will undergo renovations including an increase in seating capacity and the construction of additional stands.

== See also ==
- List of football stadiums in Saudi Arabia
