= List of Arab Cup Winners' Cup finals =

- Founded: 1989
- Abolished: 2001
- Region: Arab world (UAFA)
- Teams: 10
- Last champions: (Tunisia) Stade Tunisien (2nd title)
- Most championships: (Morocco) CO Casablanca (3 titles)

The Arab Cup Winners' Cup was a seasonal association football competition established from 1989 to 2001 for winning clubs of national cup competitions of the 22 Union of Arab Football Associations member associations.

== List of finals ==
Key
Match was won during extra time
Match was won on a penalty shoot-out

List of Arab Club Cup Winners' Cup finals
Year	Country	Team 1	Score	Team 2	Country	Venue	Attendance
1989	Tunisia	Stade Tunisien	0–0 (a.e.t.) (6–5 p)	Kuwait SC	Kuwait	Prince Abdullah al-Faisal Stadium, Jeddah	
1990	Not held						
1991	Morocco	CO Casablanca	1–0 (a.e.t.)	Al-Mokawloon Al-Arab	Egypt	Al-Maktoum Stadium, Dubai	
1992	Morocco	CO Casablanca	2–0 (a.e.t.)	Al-Sadd	Qatar	Prince Abdullah al-Faisal Stadium, Jeddah	
1993	Morocco	CO Casablanca	1–0	Al-Qadsiah	Saudi Arabia	Khalifa International Stadium, Doha	
1994	Egypt	Al-Ahly	1–0	Al-Shabab	Saudi Arabia	Cairo International Stadium, Cairo	100 000
1995	Tunisia	Club Africain	1–0 (a.e.t.)	ES Sahel	Tunisia	Stade Olympique de Sousse, Sousse	
1996	Morocco	OC Khouribga	3–1	Al-Faisaly	Jordan	Amman International Stadium, Amman	
1997	Algeria	MC Oran	2–0	Al-Shabab	Saudi Arabia	Ismailia Stadium, Ismailia	
1998	Algeria	MC Oran	2–1 (a.e.t.)	Al-Jaish	Syria	Camille Chamoun Stadium, Beirut	
1999	Qatar	Al-Ittihad	2–0	Al-Jaish	Syria	Mohammed Al-Hamad Stadium, Kuwait City	
2000	Saudi Arabia	Al-Hilal SFC	2–1 (a.e.t.)	Al-Nassr	Saudi Arabia	King Fahd International Stadium, Riyadh	65 000
2001	Tunisia	Stade Tunisien	3–1	Al-Hilal Omdurman	Sudan	Stade Chedly Zouiten, Tunis	20 000

== Performances ==
=== By club ===
Num	Club	Winners	Runners-up
1	(Morocco) CO Casablanca	3	0
2	(Algeria) MC Oran	2	0
2	(Tunisia) Stade Tunisien	2	0
4	(Egypt) Al-Ahly	1	0
4	(Saudi Arabia) Al-Hilal SFC	1	0
4	(Qatar) Al-Gharafa*	1	0
4	(Tunisia) Club Africain	1	0
4	(Morocco) OC Khouribga	1	0
9	(Syria) Al-Jaish	0	2
9	(Saudi Arabia) Al-Shabab	0	2
11	(Jordan) Al-Faisaly	0	1
11	(Sudan) Al-Hilal Omdurman	0	1
11	(Saudi Arabia) Al-Nassr	0	1
11	(Saudi Arabia) Al-Qadisiyah	0	1
11	(Egypt) Al-Mokawloon Al-Arab	0	1
11	(Tunisia) ES Sahel	0	1
11	Kuwait SC	0	1
11	(Qatar) Al-Sadd	0	1

* Al-Gharafa SC (ex. Al-Ittihad SC)

=== By country ===
Num	Nation	Winners	Runners-up	Total
1	Morocco	4	0	4
2	Tunisia	3	1	4
3	Algeria	2	0	2
4	Saudi Arabia	1	4	5
5	Egypt	1	1	2
5	Qatar	1	1	2
7	Syria	0	2	2
8	Jordan	0	1	1
8	Kuwait	0	1	1
8	Sudan	0	1	1

=== By continent ===
Num	Continent	Winners	Runners-up
1	Africa	10	3
2	Asia	2	9
