= Jamal Sellami =

Moroccan football manager (born 1970)

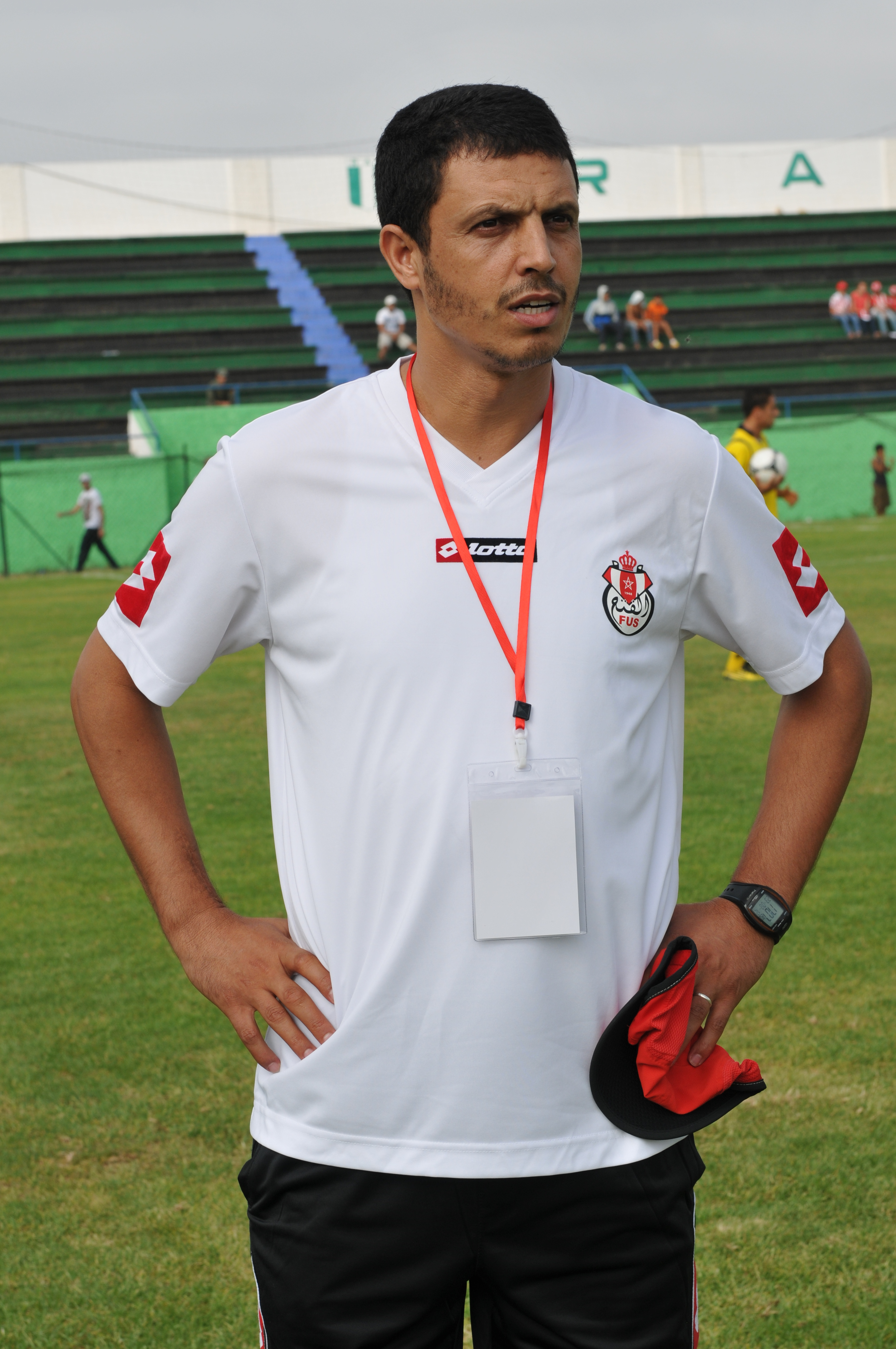
- Sellami in 2012

Personal information
- Date of birth: 6 October 1970 (age 56)
- Place of birth: Casablanca, Morocco
- Height: 1.83 m (6 ft 0 in)
- Position: Midfielder

Team information
- Current team: Al Fateh (head coach)

Senior career*
| Years | Team | Apps | (Gls) |
| 1992–1995 | Olympique Casablanca | 84 | (8) |
| 1995–1998 | Raja Casablanca | 86 | (10) |
| 1998–2001 | Beşiktaş | 54 | (6) |
| 2001–2002 | Raja Casablanca | 38 | (4) |
| 2002–2004 | MAS Fez | 56 | (6) |

International career
| 1994–2001 | Morocco | 38 | (2) |

Managerial career
- 2011–2014: FUS Rabat
- 2016–2018: Morocco A'
- 2019–2021: Raja Casablanca
- 2021–2024: FUS Rabat
- 2024–2026: Jordan
- 2026–: Al Fateh
- * Club domestic league appearances and goals

Jamal Sellami (Arabic: جَمَال السَّلَامِيّ; born 6 October 1970) is a Moroccan professional football manager and former player who is the current head coach for Al Fateh.

== Playing career ==
A midfielder, Sellami played for several clubs, including Olympique Casablanca, Raja Casablanca, Maghreb Fez and Beşiktaş in Turkey.

He played for the Morocco national team and was a participant at the 1998 FIFA World Cup.

== Coaching career ==
Sellami was the coach of the Moroccan club FUS Rabat.

In June 2024, the Jordan Football Association announced that Sellami became the manager of the Jordan national team, after Hussein Ammouta, by signing a three-year contract. He led Jordan to finish as runners-up in Group B of the World Cup qualification third round, securing their first-ever participation in the 2026 FIFA World Cup.

== Personal life ==
After the 2025 FIFA Arab Cup final loss to his native Morocco, Sellami announced that he was granted Jordanian citizenship by a royal decision from King Abdullah II. The decision was made in recognition of his significant contributions to Jordanian football, which include leading the national team to its first-ever World Cup qualification.

== Career statistics ==
| # | Date | Venue | Opponent | Score | Result | Competition |
|---|---|---|---|---|---|---|
| 1. | 17 January 1996 | Stade Jules Ladoumègue, Vitrolles, France | Armenia | 6–0 | Win | Friendly |
| 2. | 7 February 1996 | Prince Moulay Stadium, Rabat, Morocco | Luxembourg | 2–0 | Win | Friendly |
Correct as of 7 October 2015

== Managerial statistics ==
As of match played 27 June 2026

Managerial record by team and tenure
| Team | Nat. | From | To | Record | | | | | Ref. |
| Team | Nat. | From | To | G | W | D | L | Win % | Ref. |
|---|---|---|---|---|---|---|---|---|---|
| Jordan | (Jordan) | 27 August 2024 | 5 July 2026 | 34 | 11 | 11 | 12 | 32.35 | |
| Career Total | | | | 34 | 11 | 11 | 12 | 32.35 | |

== Honours ==
=== Player ===
Olympique Casablanca

- Botola Pro: 1993–94
- Moroccan Throne Cup: 1991–92
- Arab Cup Winners' Cup: 1991, 1992, 1993

Raja CA

- Botola Pro: 1995–96, 1996–97, 1997–98
- Moroccan Throne Cup: 1995–96
- CAF Champions League: 1997
- CAF Super Cup runner-up: 1998

=== Manager ===
Raja CA

- Botola Pro: 2019–20

Morocco A'

- African Nations Championship: 2018

Jordan

- FIFA Arab Cup runner-up: 2025

Individual

- Botola Pro Manager of the Season: 2019–20, 2022–23
