= Al Nasr FC in international football =

- Club: Al Nasr
- First entry: 1987 Asian Club Championship
- Latest entry: 2024–25 GCC Champions League

Titles
- GCC Champions League: 1: 2014

Al Nasr FC is an Emirati football club from the UAE Pro League, based in Dubai the country's largest city, it has contested in multiple Asian competitions, making it as far as the quarter-finals in the AFC Champions League.

== History ==
Al Nasr, despite being one of the earliest teams in the country, would only make its first real appearance in an Asian competition in 1987 Asian Club Championship where they played in the gulf group, they would finish second last only winning once and drawing once. The club would not qualify for another Asian competition until 1993–94 Asian Cup Winners' Cup however, they withdrew from the tournament. After a decade without continental football, The club finally qualified for the AFC Champions League for the first time in the 2012 edition after finishing third in the league. However, the club would fail to get past the group stage in 2012 finishing third in the group only beating the Qatari side Lekhwiya SC twice. Al Nasr made their second consecutive appearance in the AFC Champions League in 2013 but finished bottom of the group with only one point. In 2016 Al Nasr qualified for the third time after winning the president's cup, the club would pull a surprise 2–1 victory against Saudi giants Al-Ittihad to qualify for the Round of 16 of the AFC Champions League for the first time, they later faced Iranian team Tractor Sazi who topped their group. Al Nasr pulled an upset as they won 4–1 against the Iranians in the first leg, and only losing 1–3 in the second, the team qualified for the quarter-finals for the first time. The team would later face Qatari side, El Jaish, they won 3–0 on the first leg however unfortunate events hit the club as they fielded the player Wanderley, who was found to be registered using a fake Indonesian passport. the team were forced to forfeit and award the 3–0 win to El Jaish by the AFC Disciplinary Committee. The club later lost 0–1 on the second leg and the team were knocked out. They qualified again in 2019 after finishing fourth in the league but were defeated in the playoff game to the Uzbek side Pakhtakor.

== Asian competitions ==
=== AFC ===
==== Asian Club Championship ====
| Season | Round | Club | Home | Away | Aggregate |
|---|---|---|---|---|---|
| 1987 | Group 1 | (Saudi Arabia) Al-Hilal | 0–0 | | 4th |
| 1987 | Group 1 | (Bahrain) Al-Muharraq | 1–0 | | 4th |
| 1987 | Group 1 | (Kuwait) Kazma | 0–1 | | 4th |
| 1987 | Group 1 | (Oman) Fanja | 2–3 | | 4th |

==== AFC Champions League ====
| Season | Round | Club | Home | Away | Aggregate |
|---|---|---|---|---|---|
| 2012 | Group C | (Saudi Arabia) Al-Ahli | 1–2 | 1–3 | 3rd |
| 2012 | Group C | (Iran) Sepahan | 0–3 | 0–1 | 3rd |
| 2012 | Group C | (Qatar) Lekhwiya | 2–1 | 2–1 | 3rd |
| 2013 | Play-off round | (Uzbekistan) Lokomotiv Tashkent | 3–2 | | |
| 2013 | Group C | (Saudi Arabia) Al-Ahli | 1–2 | 2–2 | 4th |
| 2013 | Group C | (Iran) Sepahan | 1–2 | 0–3 | 4th |
| 2013 | Group C | (Qatar) Al-Gharafa | 2–4 | 1–3 | 4th |
| 2016 | Group A | (Iran) Sepahan | 2–0 | 0–2 | 2nd |
| 2016 | Group A | (Saudi Arabia) Al-Ittihad | 0–0 | 2–1 | 2nd |
| 2016 | Group A | (Uzbekistan) Lokomotiv Tashkent | 1–1 | 0–0 | 2nd |
| 2016 | Round of 16 | (Iran) Tractor Sazi | 4–1 | 1–3 | 5–4 |
| 2016 | Quarter-Finals | (Qatar) El Jaish | 0–1 | 0–3 (awd.) | 0–4 |
| 2019 | Play-off round | (Uzbekistan) Pakhtakor | 1–2 | | |

=== UAFA ===
==== Arab Cup Winners' Cup ====
| Season | Round | Club | Home | Away | Aggregate |
|---|---|---|---|---|---|
| 1991 | Group 1 | | | | |
| 1991 | Group 1 | (Lebanon) Al Ansar | 1–0 | | 3rd |
| 1991 | Group 1 | (Egypt) Al Mokawloon Al Arab | 0–0 | | 3rd |
| 1991 | Group 1 | (Saudi Arabia) Al-Nassr | 1–1 | | 3rd |
| 1991 | Group 1 | (Kuwait) Kazma | 0–0 | | 3rd |
| 1993 | Group 2 | | | | |
| 1993 | Group 2 | (Morocco) CO Casablanca | 0–4 | | 5th |
| 1993 | Group 2 | (Algeria) ASO Chlef | 0–1 | | 5th |
| 1993 | Group 2 | (Palestine) Haifa | 0–2 | | 5th |
| 1993 | Group 2 | (Saudi Arabia) Al Qadsiah | 0–0 | | 5th |
| 1995 | Group 2 | | | | |
| 1995 | Group 2 | (Tunisia) Club Africain | 1–2 | | 5th |
| 1995 | Group 2 | (Egypt) Al Ahly | 1–3 | | 5th |
| 1995 | Group 2 | (Syria) Al-Ittihad | 0–3 | | 5th |
| 1995 | Group 2 | (Saudi Arabia) Al-Riyadh | 0–2 | | 5th |

==== GCC Champions League ====
| Season | Round | Club | Home | Away | Aggregate |
|---|---|---|---|---|---|
| 2014 | Group C | | | | |
| 2014 | Group C | (Bahrain) Busaiteen | 0–0 | 1–0 | 1st |
| 2014 | Group C | (Qatar) Al-Khor | 5–0 | 2–2 | 1st |
| 2014 | Quarter-Finals | (Kuwait) Al Jahra | 2–2 (p) (3–1) | | |
| 2014 | Semi-Finals | (Oman) Al-Nahda | 2–1 | 1–1 | 3–2 |
| 2014 | Final | (Oman) Saham | 2–1 | | |
| 2015 | Group C | | | | |
| 2015 | Group C | (Bahrain) Manama | 2–1 | 1–2 | 1st |
| 2015 | Group C | (Kuwait) Kazma | 2–1 | 2–1 | 1st |
| 2015 | Quarter-Finals | (Saudi Arabia) Al-Taawoun | 1–1 (p) (4–2) | | |
| 2015 | Semi-Finals | (United Arab Emirates) Al Shabab | 1–1 | 0–2 | 1–3 |
| 2024–25 | Group A | | | | |
| 2024–25 | Group A | (Iraq) Duhok | | | |
| 2024–25 | Group A | (Oman) Dhofar | | | |
| 2024–25 | Group A | (Yemen) Al Ahli Sanaa | | | |

== Overall record ==
=== Record by competition ===
| Competition | Played | Won | Drew | Lost | GF | GA | GD | Win% |
|---|---|---|---|---|---|---|---|---|
| AFC Champions League | 24 | 6 | 4 | 14 | 27 | 43 | −16 | 25.00 |
| Asian Club Championship | 4 | 1 | 1 | 2 | 3 | 4 | −1 | 25.00 |
| Arab Cup Winners' Cup | 12 | 1 | 4 | 7 | 4 | 18 | −14 | 8.33 |
| GCC Champions League | 15 | 7 | 6 | 2 | 25 | 17 | +8 | 46.67 |
| Total | 55 | 15 | 15 | 25 | 59 | 82 | −23 | 27.27 |

=== Record by Country ===
| Country | Pld | W | D | L | GF | GA | GD | Win% |
|---|---|---|---|---|---|---|---|---|
| Algeria | 1 | 0 | 0 | 1 | 0 | 1 | −1 | 0.00 |
| Bahrain | 5 | 3 | 1 | 1 | 6 | 3 | +3 | 60.00 |
| Egypt | 2 | 0 | 1 | 1 | 1 | 3 | −2 | 0.00 |
| Kuwait | 5 | 2 | 2 | 1 | 6 | 5 | +1 | 40.00 |
| Lebanon | 1 | 1 | 0 | 0 | 1 | 0 | +1 | 100.00 |
| Morocco | 1 | 0 | 0 | 1 | 0 | 4 | −4 | 0.00 |
| Oman | 4 | 2 | 1 | 1 | 7 | 6 | +1 | 50.00 |
| Palestine | 1 | 0 | 0 | 1 | 0 | 2 | −2 | 0.00 |
| Qatar | 8 | 3 | 1 | 4 | 14 | 15 | −1 | 37.50 |
| Saudi Arabia | 11 | 1 | 6 | 4 | 9 | 14 | −5 | 9.09 |
| Syria | 1 | 0 | 0 | 1 | 0 | 3 | −3 | 0.00 |
| Tunisia | 1 | 0 | 0 | 1 | 1 | 2 | −1 | 0.00 |
| United Arab Emirates | 2 | 0 | 1 | 1 | 1 | 3 | −2 | 0.00 |
| Uzbekistan | 4 | 1 | 2 | 1 | 5 | 5 | +0 | 25.00 |
