= Valeriu Tița =

Romanian footballer and coach

Personal information
- Date of birth: 22 April 1966 (age 60)
- Place of birth: Turnu Severin, Romania
- Position: Midfielder

Senior career*
Years	Team	Apps	(Gls)
1984–1990	Drobeta-Turnu Severin		
1990–1992	Corvinul Hunedoara		
1992–1995	Olympique Casablanca		
1995–1996	Raja Casablanca		
1996–1998	Maghreb de Fès		
1998–2000	Drobeta-Turnu Severin		

Managerial career
- 2007–2008: Al-Ittihad Aleppo
- 2009: Drobeta-Turnu Severin
- 2010: Al-Ittihad Aleppo
- 2010–2011: Syria
- 2011: Al-Shorta
- 2011: Al Naser
- 2011: Al Sharjah
- 2012: Al Sharjah
- 2012: Al-Shorta
- 2012–2013: Al-Faisaly Amman
- 2013–2014: Al-Safa
- 2015: Al-Orobah
- 2015–2016: Nejmeh SC
- 2017–2018: Al-Talaba
- 2018–2019: Al-Safa
- 2019–2021: Al-Minaa
- 2021: Al-Hussein
- 2021–2022: Syria
- 2023: Al-Ain
- 2024–2025: Bashundhara Kings
- 2025: Al-Seeb
- * Club domestic league appearances and goals

Valeriu Tița (born 22 April 1966) is a Romanian professional football coach and former player, who last coached Oman Professional League club Al-Seeb. He led Syrian club Al-Ittihad Aleppo to the AFC Cup title in 2010.

== Playing career ==
Tița began his football career as a midfielder with hometown side FC Drobeta-Turnu Severin and Corvinul Hunedoara. In 1992, he moved to Morocco to play for Olympique de Casablanca under head coach Ilie Balaci, where he won the Moroccan Football League and the Arab Cup Winners' Cup twice. He then spent a few seasons with Raja Casablanca and Maghreb de Fès before returning to his homeland to become a manager. He holds a UEFA Pro License.

== Coaching career ==
=== Al-Ittihad Aleppo ===
Tita led Al-Ittihad Aleppo to 2010 AFC Cup Finals. Al-Ittihad won the game 4–2 after penalties shoot-out against Al-Qadsia. The game was tied 1–1 after regular time and Extra Time. It was their first title.

The AFC Cup title considered as the most honourable achievement of his coaching career and he became beloved by most Syrians.

=== Syria national team ===
On 21 December 2010, he became coach of Syria national team. In his first international friendly game, he won 1–0 against Iraq, then lost to Iraq 0–1 on a second game. Tita led Syria team in the 2011 AFC Asian Cup and won 2–1 against Saudi Arabia, and lost 1–2 to Japan and 1–2 to Jordan.

He left the Syria team after the team failed to qualify to quarter finals.

=== Short spells in different countries ===
From 2011 to 2019, Tita coached Al-Shorta in Syria, Al Naser in Kuwait, Al Sharjah in UAE, Al-Faisaly Amman in Jordan, Al-Safa and Nejmeh SC in Lebanon, Al-Orobah in Saudi Arabia, and Al-Talaba in Iraq.

On 23 July 2019, Tita came back to Iraq and signed for Al-Mina'a SC club. The Romanian coach had around 5 to 10 games to look for the players he wanted to start the next season in a more positive fashion. Tita picked 10 players from the team and wanted some new, substantial signings to improve the challenge Al-Minaa would be able to make in the Iraqi Premier League. He remained there until January 2021.

=== Return to Syria national team ===
In November 2021, he was reappointed as coach of Syria national team. He led his team during the 2021 FIFA Arab Cup, before being dismissed after two losses against United Arab Emirates and South Korea in the 2022 FIFA World Cup qualification.

=== Al-Ain ===
On 24 June 2023, Tița was appointed as head coach of Saudi club Al-Ain.

=== Bashundhara Kings ===
On 9 July 2024, Tița was appointed as head coach of Bangladesh Premier League club Bashundhara Kings. During his tenure, he led the club to two domestic cup victories, but his stint with the club ended in June 2025 following disputes over unpaid salaries and bonuses.

== Managerial statistics ==
As of match played 1 February 2022

Managerial record by team and tenure
Team	From	To	Record					Ref.
Team	From	To	P	W	D	L	Win %	Ref.
Ittihad Aleppo	1 July 2007	30 June 2008	37	19	11	7	51.4	
Drobeta Severin	14 September 2009	31 December 2009	11	5	0	6	45.5	
Ittihad Aleppo	1 July 2010	10 December 2010	14	6	5	3	42.9	
Syria	18 December 2010	9 February 2011	7	2	0	5	28.6	
Al-Shorta	8 February 2011	31 December 2011	18	10	5	3	55.6	
Al-Nasr SC	1 August 2011	18 September 2011	7	1	0	6	14.3	
Sharjah FC	18 September 2011	14 December 2011	12	2	2	8	16.7	
Sharjah FC	2 February 2012	3 April 2012	8	0	1	7	0.0	
Al-Shorta	18 April 2012	5 November 2012	6	3	1	2	50.0	
Al-Faisaly	6 November 2012	24 April 2013	23	14	6	3	60.9	
Safa SC	9 July 2013	18 May 2014	34	18	10	6	52.9	
Al-Orobah	2 January 2015	6 April 2015	10	3	1	6	30.0	
Nejmeh SC	20 July 2015	17 October 2016	37	21	10	6	56.8	
Al-Talaba	23 September 2017	13 January 2018	16	5	4	7	31.3	
Safa SC	10 July 2018	23 March 2019	7	0	3	4	0.0	
Al-Mina'a	23 July 2019	16 January 2021	27	9	9	9	33.3	
Syria	18 November 2021	2 February 2022	5	1	0	4	20.0	
Al-Ain	24 June 2023	9 November 2023	10	3	2	5	30.0	
Bashundhara Kings	9 July 2024	Present	0	0	0	0	—	
Total			290	122	71	97	42.1	—

== Honours ==
=== Player ===
Olympique Casablanca

- Moroccan League: 1993–94
- Arab Cup Winners' Cup: 1993, 1994

Raja Casablanca

- Moroccan League: 1995–96
- Moroccan Cup: 1995–96

=== Manager ===
Al-Ittihad Aleppo

- AFC Cup: 2010

Al-Safa

- Lebanese Super Cup: 2013

Nejmeh

- Lebanese FA Cup: 2015–16
- Lebanese Elite Cup: 2016
- Lebanese Super Cup: 2016

Bashundhara Kings

- Bangladesh Challenge Cup: 2024
- Federation Cup: 2024–25
