= Arab Elite Cup =

1992 Arab Elite Cup
كأس السوبر العربي 1992

Tournament details
- Host country: Morocco
- Teams: 4 (from UAFA confederations)
- Venue: 1 (in Casablanca host cities)

Final positions
- Champions: (Morocco) Wydad AC (1st title)
- Runners-up: (Saudi Arabia) Al-Hilal

Tournament statistics
- Matches played: 6
- Goals scored: 15 (2.5 per match)

The 1992 Arab Elite Cup was an international club competition played by the winners and runners up of the Arab Club Champions Cup and Arab Cup Winners' Cup. It was held in Morocco to support the country's bid to host the 1998 FIFA World Cup.

It was won by the host team and reigning Arab Club Champions Cup champions Wydad Athletic Club (winners of the last edition in 1989). Arab Club Champions Cup runners up Al-Hilal also came runners up once again. Olympique de Casablanca and El Mokawloon El Arab also took part.

A similar Arab Super Cup tournament was later launched by the Union of Arab Football Associations in 1995.

== Teams ==
Team	Qualification
(Morocco) Wydad Athletic Club	Winners of the 1989 Arab Club Champions Cup
(Saudi Arabia) Al-Hilal	Runners-up of the 1989 Arab Club Champions Cup
(Morocco) Olympique de Casablanca	Winners of the 1991 Arab Cup Winners' Cup
(Egypt) El Mokawloon El Arab	Runners-up of the 1991 Arab Cup Winners' Cup

== Results and standings ==
Team	Pld	W	D	L	GF	GA	GD	Pts
(Morocco) Wydad AC	3	1	2	0	4	3	+1	4
(Saudi Arabia) Al-Hilal	3	1	1	1	4	4	0	3
(Morocco) Olympique de Casablanca	3	1	1	1	4	4	0	3
(Egypt) El Mokawloon El Arab	3	1	0	2	3	4	−1	2

Wydad AC (Morocco)	1 - 1	(Saudi Arabia) Al-Hilal

Stade Mohammed V, Casablanca

El Mokawloon El Arab (Egypt)	0 – 2	(Morocco) Olympique de Casablanca

Stade Mohammed V, Casablanca

Wydad AC (Morocco)	1 – 1	(Morocco) Olympique de Casablanca

Stade Mohammed V, Casablanca

Al-Hilal (Saudi Arabia)	0 – 2	(Egypt) El Mokawloon El Arab

Stade Mohammed V, Casablanca

Wydad AC (Morocco)	2 – 1	(Egypt) El Mokawloon El Arab

Stade Mohammed V, Casablanca

Al-Hilal (Saudi Arabia)	3 – 1	(Morocco) Olympique de Casablanca

Stade Mohammed V, Casablanca

Results in no particular order, dates of matches not known
