= 1996 Arab Super Cup =

بطولة النخبة العربية للأندية 1996

Tournament details
- Host country: Tunisia
- Dates: 30 April – 4 May
- Teams: 3 (from UAFA confederations)
- Venue: 1 (in Tunis host cities)

Final positions
- Champions: (Tunisia) Espérance de Tunis (1st title)
- Runners-up: (Saudi Arabia) Al-Riyadh

Tournament statistics
- Matches played: 3
- Goals scored: 4 (1.33 per match)
- Top scorer: (Tunisia) Hassen Gabsi (2 goals)
- Best player: (Tunisia) Hassen Gabsi
- Best goalkeeper: (Tunisia) Chokri El Ouaer

The 1996 Arab Super Cup was an international club competition played by the winners and runners up of the Arab Club Champions Cup and Arab Cup Winners' Cup. It was the second edition of the tournament to be played. Espérance de Tunis were crowned champions, with Saudi Arabian outfit Al-Riyadh runner up. Also represented were Al-Hilal, also of Saudi Arabia. It is unclear why Al-Riyadh took part in the competition as they weren't represented as either champions or runners up of the Arab Club Champions Cup or Arab Cup Winners' Cup.

== Teams ==
Team	Qualification	Previous participation (bold indicates winners)
(Saudi Arabia) Al-Hilal	Winners of the 1995 Arab Club Champions Cup	1 (1995)
(Tunisia) Espérance de Tunis	Runners-up of the 1995 Arab Club Champions Cup	
(Saudi Arabia) Al-Riyadh	Semi-finalist of the 1995 Arab Cup Winners' Cup	

== Results and standings ==
Team	Pld	W	D	L	GF	GA	GD	Pts
(Tunisia) Espérance de Tunis	2	1	1	0	3	1	+2	**4**
(Saudi Arabia) Al-Riyadh	2	0	2	0	1	1	0	**2**
(Saudi Arabia) Al-Hilal	2	0	1	1	0	2	−2	**1**

30 April 1996

Espérance de Tunis (Tunisia)	1–1	(Saudi Arabia) Al-Riyadh
Ayadi Hamrouni		walid almadouh

Stade El Menzah, Tunis

Al-Riyadh (Saudi Arabia)	0–0	(Saudi Arabia) Al-Hilal

Stade El Menzah, Tunis

4 May 1996

Al-Hilal (Saudi Arabia)	0–2	(Tunisia) Espérance de Tunis
		Gabsi 43'; Thabet 83'

Stade El Menzah, Tunis
Attendance: 40.000
Referee: Ali Bujsaim (United Arab Emirates)

== Awards ==
- Fairplay team: Al-Riyadh
