= 1999 Saudi Crown Prince Cup =

1999 Crown Prince Cup
Tournament details
- Country: Saudi Arabia
- Dates: 14 March – 16 April 1999
- Teams: 16 (main competition)

Final positions
- Champions: Al-Shabab (3rd title)
- Runners-up: Al-Hilal
- Asian Cup Winners' Cup: Al-Shabab
- Arab Cup Winners' Cup: Al-Hilal

Tournament statistics
- Matches played: 15
- Goals scored: 37 (2.47 per match)
- Top goal scorer(s): Mohammed Al-Enazi; Bashar Abdullah; Abdullah Al-Sheehan (3 goals each)

The 1999 Crown Prince Cup was the 24th season of the Saudi premier football knockout tournament since its establishment in 1957. The main competition started on 14 March and concluded with the final on 16 April 1999.

Al-Ahli were the defending champions; however, they were eliminated in the Round of 16 by Al-Hilal.

In the final, Al-Shabab defeated Al-Hilal 1–0 to secure their third title. The final was held at the Youth Welfare Stadium in Dammam for the first time. As winners of the tournament, Al-Shabab qualified for the 2000–01 Asian Cup Winners' Cup. As runners-up, Al-Hilal qualified for the 2000 Arab Cup Winners' Cup.

== Qualifying rounds ==
All of the competing teams that are not members of the Premier League competed in the qualifying rounds to secure one of 4 available places in the Round of 16. First Division sides Al-Qadisiyah, Al-Taawoun, Al-Tai and Ohod qualified.

== Bracket ==
Round of 16
A	Al-Tai	1 (3)
H	Al-Taawoun (pen.)	1 (4)
H	Al-Ahli	1
A	Al-Hilal	2
H	Al-Ettifaq	1
A	Hajer	0
H	Al-Najma	3
A	Al-Qadisiyah	1
H	Al-Shabab	2
A	Ittihad	0
A	Ohod	4
H	Al-Ansar	2
A	Al-Shoulla	1
H	Al-Wehda (asdet)	2
H	Al-Riyadh	0
A	Al-Nassr	1

Quarter-finals
A	Al-Taawoun	0
H	Al-Hilal	1
H	Al-Ettifaq	0
A	Al-Najma	1
A	Al-Shabab	4
H	Ohod	0
A	Al-Wehda	0
H	Al-Nassr	5

Semi-finals
A	Al-Hilal	2
H	Al-Najma	0
H	Al-Shabab	1
A	Al-Nassr	0

Final
–	Al-Hilal	0
–	Al-Shabab	1

== Round of 16 ==
The draw for the Round of 16 was held on 9 March 1999. The Round of 16 fixtures were played on 14 and 15 March 1999. All times are local, AST (UTC+3).

14 March 1999 7	Al-Taawoun (2)	1–1 (a.e.t.) (4–3 p)	Al-Tai (1)	Buraidah
16:00	Al-Mansour 10' (pen.)	Report	K. Al-Deayea 13'	Stadium: Prince Abdullah bin Abdul Aziz Stadium; Referee: Mohammed Al-Suwail
	Penalties
	Al-Ahmari (penalty scored); Al-Dakheel (penalty scored); Al-Ghulaiqah (penalty missed); Al-Shaalan (penalty scored); Al-Haddad (penalty scored)		(penalty scored) Al-Ateeq; (penalty missed) Jako; (penalty scored) M. Al-Saqri; (penalty scored) Al-Ghazi; (penalty missed) M. Al-Deayea

14 March 1999 1	Al-Wehda (1)	2–1 (a.e.t.)	Al-Shoulla (2)	Mecca
20:00	Al-Dossari 6'; Mekbeshi 102'	Report	Al-Khnein 61' (pen.)	Stadium: King Abdul Aziz Stadium; Referee: Awidhah Mansour

14 March 1999 2	Al-Shabab (1)	2–0	Al-Ittihad (1)	Riyadh
20:00	Majrashi 18'; Seddiq 60'	Report		Stadium: King Fahd International Stadium; Referee: Omer Al Mehannah

15 March 1999 6	Al-Ansar (1)	2–4	Ohod (2)	Medina
16:00	Boudal 19' (pen.), 55'	Report	Suleiman 4'; Gohl 13'; Tukar 65'; Bakhit 87'	Stadium: Al-Ansar Club Stadium; Referee: Ibrahim Al-Nafisah

15 March 1999 3	Al-Ettifaq (1)	1–0	Hajer (1)	Dammam
20:30	Khalil 34'	Report		Stadium: Youth Welfare Stadium; Referee: Mujeb Al-Dossari

15 March 1999 4	Al-Najma (1)	3–1	Al-Qadisiyah (2)	Unaizah
20:30	Kwakye 7'; Sharahili 39'; Al-Jassar 58'	Report	Al-Shammari 90+1'	Stadium: Al-Najma Club Stadium; Referee: Dhafer Abo Zanda

15 March 1999 5	Al-Ahli (1)	1–2	Al-Hilal (1)	Jeddah
20:30	Gilson 30' (pen.)	Report	Hamrouni 16'; Abdullah 28'	Stadium: Youth Welfare Stadium; Referee: Yousef Al-Aqili

15 March 1999 8	Al-Riyadh (1)	0–1	Al-Nassr (1)	Riyadh
20:30		Report	Al-Enazi 6'	Stadium: King Fahd International Stadium; Referee: Abdulaziz Al-Dakheel

== Quarter-finals ==
The draw for the Quarter-finals was held on 20 March 1999. The Quarter-finals fixtures were played on 1 and 2 April 1999. All times are local, AST (UTC+3).

1 April 1999 9	Al-Nassr (1)	5–0	Al-Wehda (1)	Riyadh
20:30	Al-Huraifi 4'; Al-Enazi 19', 69'; Uche 90+1'; Mater 90+2'	Report		Stadium: King Fahd International Stadium; Referee: Mujeb Al-Dossari

1 April 1999 12	Al-Ettifaq (1)	0–1	Al-Najma (1)	Dammam
20:30		Report	Al-Wehaibi 90'	Stadium: Youth Welfare Stadium; Referee: Abdulrahman Al-Zaid

2 April 1999 10	Al-Hilal (1)	1–0	Al-Taawoun (2)	Riyadh
20:30	Abdullah 86' (pen.)	Report		Stadium: King Fahd International Stadium; Referee: Nasser Al-Hamdan

2 April 1999 11	Ohod (2)	0–4	Al-Shabab (1)	Medina
20:30		Report	Yekini 43'; Al-Waked 68'; Al-Sheehan 72'; Al-Dawod 78' (pen.)	Stadium: Prince Mohammed bin Abdul Aziz Stadium; Referee: Mohammed Al-Suwail

== Semi-finals ==
The draw for the Semi-finals was held on 3 April 1999. The Semi-finals fixtures were played on 7 and 8 April 1999. All times are local, AST (UTC+3).

7 April 1999 14	Al-Shabab (1)	1–0	Al-Nassr (1)	Riyadh
20:30	Al-Sheehan 29'	Report		Stadium: King Fahd International Stadium; Referee: Omer Al Mehannah

8 April 1999 13	Al-Najma (1)	0–2	Al-Hilal (1)	Unaizah
20:30		Report	Al-Jaber 78'; Abdullah 88'	Stadium: Department of Education Stadium; Referee: Ibrahim Al-Nafisah

== Final ==
The 1999 Crown Prince Cup Final was played on 16 April 1999 at the Youth Welfare Stadium in Dammam between Al-Hilal and Al-Shabab. This was the first Crown Prince Cup final to be held at the stadium. This was the first meeting between these two sides in the final. This was Al-Shabab's fifth final and Al-Hilal's third final. All times are local, AST (UTC+3).

16 April 1999
20:35

Al-Hilal	0–1	Al-Shabab
	Report	Al-Sheehan 24'

Youth Welfare Stadium, Dammam
Attendance: 34,058
Referee: Yousef Al-Aqili

== Top goalscorers ==
Rank	Player	Club	Goals
1	(Qatar) Mohammed Al-Enazi	Al-Nassr	3
1	(Kuwait) Bashar Abdullah	Al-Hilal	3
1	(Saudi Arabia) Abdullah Al-Sheehan	Al-Shabab	3
4	(Saudi Arabia) Faisal Boudal	Al-Ansar	2
