= 1994 Arab Cup Winners' Cup =

الكأس العربية للأندية الفائزة بالكؤوس 1994
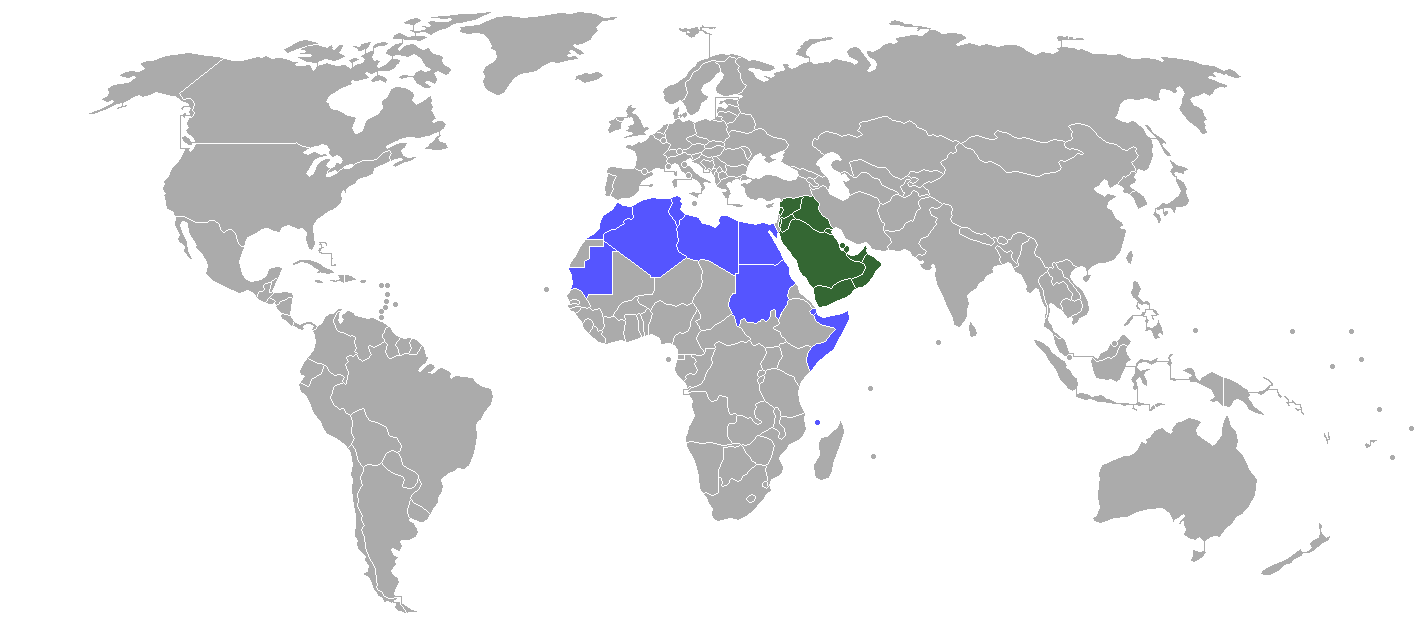
- Members of Union of Arab Football Associations.

Tournament details
- Host country: Egypt
- City: Cairo
- Dates: 10 – 19 Mar 1995
- Teams: 8 (from UAFA confederations)
- Venue: 1 (in 1 host city)

Final positions
- Champions: (Egypt) Al-Ahly (1st title)
- Runners-up: (Saudi Arabia) Al-Shabab
- Third place: (Morocco) CO Casablanca
- Fourth place: (Tunisia) AS Marsa

Tournament statistics
- Matches played: 15
- Goals scored: 44 (2.93 per match)
- Top scorer(s): (Egypt) Walid Salah El-Din (Guinea) Aboubacar Diawara (Kuwait) Hamad Al-Saleh (3 goals each)
- Best player: (Guinea) Aboubacar Diawara
- Best goalkeeper: (Saudi Arabia) Abderrahman Al-Hamdane

The 1994 Arab Cup Winners' Cup was the fifth edition of the Arab Cup Winners' Cup held in Cairo, Egypt between 10 – 19 March 1995, one year after. The teams represented Arab nations from Africa and Asia. Al-Ahly of Egypt won the final against Al-Shabab of Saudi Arabia.

== Preliminary stage ==
=== Zone 1 (Gulf Area) ===
Al-Arabi and Qadsia SC advanced to the final tournament.

=== Zone 2 (Red Sea) ===
Al-Shabab advanced to the final tournament.

=== Zone 3 (North Africa) ===
AS Marsa (Tunisia)	4 – 0	(Algeria) AS Aïn M'lila

Stade Abdelaziz Chtioui, La Marsa

AS Aïn M'lila (Algeria)	2 – 0	(Tunisia) AS Marsa

Stade des Frères Demane Debbih, Aïn M'lila

AS Marsa advanced to the final tournament.

=== Zone 4 (East Region) ===
Al-Faisaly and Shabab Rafah advanced to the final tournament.

== Group stage ==
The eight teams were drawn into two groups of four. Each group was played on one leg basis. The winners and runners-up of each group advanced to the semi-finals.

=== Group 1 ===
Team	Pld	W	D	L	GF	GA	GD	Pts
(Egypt) Al-Ahly	3	3	0	0	6	1	+5	6
(Tunisia) AS Marsa	3	1	1	1	7	4	+3	3
(Qatar) Al-Arabi	3	1	1	1	2	4	−2	3
(Jordan) Al-Faisaly	3	0	0	3	1	7	−6	0

10 March 1995

AS Marsa (Tunisia)	1 – 1	(Qatar) Al-Arabi

Cairo International Stadium, Cairo, Egypt
10 March 1995

Al-Ahly (Egypt)	1 – 0	(Jordan) Al-Faisaly
Abdel-Aal

Cairo International Stadium, Cairo, Egypt

12 March 1995

Al-Faisaly (Jordan)	0 – 1	(Qatar) Al-Arabi

Cairo International Stadium, Cairo, Egypt
12 March 1995

Al-Ahly (Egypt)	2 – 1	(Tunisia) AS Marsa
H. Hassan; Salah El-Din

Cairo International Stadium, Cairo, Egypt

14 March 1995

AS Marsa (Tunisia)	5 – 1	(Jordan) Al-Faisaly

Cairo International Stadium, Cairo, Egypt
14 March 1995

Al-Ahly (Egypt)	3 – 0	(Qatar) Al-Arabi
Ayman; Walid

Cairo International Stadium, Cairo, Egypt

=== Group 2 ===
Team	Pld	W	D	L	GF	GA	GD	Pts
(Saudi Arabia) Al-Shabab	3	3	0	0	4	0	+4	6
(Morocco) CO Casablanca	3	2	0	1	9	4	+5	4
(Kuwait) Qadsia SC	3	1	0	2	6	5	+1	2
(Palestine) Shabab Rafah	3	0	0	3	1	11	−10	0

11 March 1995

CO Casablanca (Morocco)	5 – 1	(Palestine) Shabab Rafah

Cairo International Stadium, Cairo, Egypt
11 March 1995

Al-Shabab (Saudi Arabia)	1 – 0	(Kuwait) Qadsia SC

Cairo International Stadium, Cairo, Egypt

13 March 1995

Qadsia SC (Kuwait)	4 – 0	(Palestine) Shabab Rafah

Cairo International Stadium, Cairo, Egypt
13 March 1995

CO Casablanca (Morocco)	0 – 1	(Saudi Arabia) Al-Shabab

Cairo International Stadium, Cairo, Egypt

15 March 1995

Al-Shabab (Saudi Arabia)	2 – 0	(Palestine) Shabab Rafah

Cairo International Stadium, Cairo, Egypt
15 March 1995

CO Casablanca (Morocco)	4 – 2	(Kuwait) Qadsia SC

Cairo International Stadium, Cairo, Egypt

== Knock-out stage ==
Semi-finals
17 March – Cairo
(Egypt) Al-Ahly (a.e.t.)	3
(Morocco) CO Casablanca	2
17 March – Cairo
(Saudi Arabia) Al-Shabab	2
(Tunisia) AS Marsa	0

Final
19 March – Cairo
(Egypt) Al-Ahly	1
(Saudi Arabia) Al-Shabab	0

=== Semi-finals ===
17 March 1995

Al-Ahly (Egypt)	3 – 2 (a.e.t.)	(Morocco) CO Casablanca
Hanafy 21', 55'; Salah El-Din 111'		Sellami 33'; Bellagha 78'

Cairo International Stadium, Cairo, Egypt
Attendance: 40,000
Referee: ... ... (Tunisia)

17 March 1995

Al-Shabab (Saudi Arabia)	2 – 0	(Tunisia) AS Marsa
Koma 40'; Anwar 66'

Cairo International Stadium, Cairo, Egypt

=== Final ===
19 March 1995

Al-Ahly (Egypt)	1 - 0	(Saudi Arabia) Al-Shabab
Aboagye 13'

Cairo International Stadium, Cairo
Attendance: 100,000
Referee: Ali Bujsaim (United Arab Emirates)

== Winners ==
1994 Arab Cup Winners' Cup
(Egypt)
Al Ahly
First title
