= 2000 Arab Cup Winners' Cup =

الكأس العربية للأندية الفائزة بالكؤوس 2000

Tournament details
- Host country: Saudi Arabia
- City: Riyadh
- Dates: 8 – 22 November 2000
- Teams: 10 (from UAFA confederations)
- Venues: 2 (in 1 host city)

Final positions
- Champions: (Saudi Arabia) Al-Hilal (1st title)
- Runners-up: (Saudi Arabia) Al-Nassr

Tournament statistics
- Matches played: 23
- Goals scored: 76 (3.3 per match)
- Top scorer(s): (Saudi Arabia) Abdullah Al-Dosari (6 goals)
- Best player: (Saudi Arabia) Nawaf Al-Temyat
- Best goalkeeper: (Saudi Arabia) Mohammed Al-Khojali

The 2000 Arab Cup Winners' Cup was the 11th edition of the Arab Cup Winners' Cup held in Riyadh, Saudi Arabia between 8 – 22 November 2000. The teams represented Arab nations from Africa and Asia. Al-Hilal from Saudi Arabia won the final against Al-Nassr from the same country for the first time.

== Qualifying round ==
Al-Hilal (the hosts) and Al-Ittihad (the holders) qualified automatically.

=== Zone 1 (Gulf Area) ===
Qualifying tournament held in Dubai, United Arab Emirates. Representatives of Bahrain and Oman withdrew.

Team 1	Score	Team 2
Day 1 5 September)
Al-Wasl (United Arab Emirates)	1–1	(Qatar) Al-Rayyan
Day 2 (8 September)
Al-Rayyan (Qatar)	1–2	(Kuwait) Al-Arabi
Day 3 (11 September)
Al-Arabi (Kuwait)	2–3	(United Arab Emirates) Al-Wasl

Team	Pld	W	D	L	GF	GA	GD	Pts
(United Arab Emirates) Al-Wasl	2	1	1	0	4	3	+1	4
(Kuwait) Al-Arabi	2	1	0	1	4	4	0	3
(Qatar) Al-Rayyan	2	0	1	1	2	3	−1	1

Al-Wasl & Al-Arabi advanced to the final tournament. However Al-Wasl withdrew, Al-Rayyan admitted instead.

=== Zone 2 (Red Sea) ===
Qualifying tournament held in Cairo, Egypt. Al-Wehda of Yemen withdrew.

Team 1	Score	Team 2
Day 1 25 August)
Al-Nassr (Saudi Arabia)	2–1	(Sudan) Al-Merrikh
Day 2 (27 August)
Zamalek SC (Egypt)	2–1	(Sudan) Al-Merrikh
Day 3 (29 August)
Zamalek SC (Egypt)	1–0	(Saudi Arabia) Al-Nassr

Team	Pld	W	D	L	GF	GA	GD	Pts
(Egypt) Zamalek SC	2	2	0	0	3	1	+2	6
(Saudi Arabia) Al-Nassr	2	1	0	1	2	2	0	3
(Sudan) Al-Merrikh	2	0	0	2	2	4	−2	0 (Note: Zamalek SC & Al-Nassr advanced to the final tournament. However Zamalek withdrew, Al-Merrikh admitted instead.)

=== Zone 3 (North Africa) ===
Libya representative withdrew.
USM Annaba, Algeria and SCC Mohammédia, Morocco qualified.

=== Zone 4 (East Region) ===
Qualifying tournament held in Amman, Jordan.

Team 1	Score	Team 2
Day 1 5 July)
Al-Wehdat (Jordan)	5–1	(Palestine) Shabab Khan Yunis
Day 2 (7 July)
Shabab Khan Yunis (Palestine)	1–7	(Syria) Jableh SC
Day 3 (9 July)
Al-Wehdat (Jordan)	1–0	(Syria) Jableh SC

Team	Pld	W	D	L	GF	GA	GD	Pts
(Jordan) Al-Wehdat	2	2	0	0	6	1	+5	6
(Syria) Jableh SC	2	1	0	1	7	2	+5	3
(Palestine) Shabab Khan Yunis	2	0	0	2	2	12	−10	0

Al-Wehdat & Jableh SC advanced to the final tournament.

== Group stage ==
=== Group A ===
Team	Pld	W	D	L	GF	GA	GD	Pts
(Saudi Arabia) Al-Nassr	4	3	1	0	10	2	+8	10
(Morocco) SCC Mohammédia	4	2	1	1	7	3	+4	7
(Jordan) Al-Wehdat	4	2	1	1	8	9	−1	7
(Qatar) Al-Ittihad	4	1	1	2	5	8	−3	4
(Qatar) Al-Rayyan	4	0	0	4	6	14	−8	0

8 November 2000

Al-Rayyan (Qatar)	1 – 5	(Morocco) SCC Mohammédia
Al Mulla 66'		17' Rokki; 24' Benatia; 56', 61' Omar; 75' Abderrahim

Riyadh
8 November 2000

Al-Nassr (Saudi Arabia)	3 – 0	(Jordan) Al-Wehdat
M. Al-Dosari 4'; Yazeed 36', 80'

King Fahd International Stadium, Riyadh

10 November 2000

Al-Wehdat (Jordan)	1 – 0	(Morocco) SCC Mohammédia
Abdullah 64'

King Fahd International Stadium, Riyadh
10 November 2000

Al-Nassr (Saudi Arabia)	3 – 0	(Qatar) Al-Ittihad
Junior; M. Al-Dosari; Al-Halawi

Riyadh

12 November 2000

SCC Mohammédia (Morocco)	2 – 1	(Qatar) Al-Ittihad

Riyadh
12 November 2000

Al-Wehdat (Jordan)	4 – 3	(Qatar) Al-Rayyan

Prince Faisal bin Fahd Stadium, Riyadh

14 November 2000

Al-Ittihad (Qatar)	1 – 0	(Qatar) Al-Rayyan

Riyadh
14 November 2000

SCC Mohammédia (Morocco)	0 – 0	(Saudi Arabia) Al-Nassr

Riyadh

16 November 2000

Al-Ittihad (Qatar)	3 – 3	(Jordan) Al-Wehdat

King Fahd International Stadium, Riyadh
16 November 2000

Al-Nassr (Saudi Arabia)	4 – 2	(Qatar) Al-Rayyan

Riyadh

=== Group B ===
Team	Pld	W	D	L	GF	GA	GD	Pts
(Saudi Arabia) Al-Hilal	4	3	1	0	11	4	+7	10
(Kuwait) Al-Arabi	4	3	0	1	8	3	+5	9
(Algeria) USM Annaba	4	2	0	2	7	7	0	6
(Sudan) Al-Merrikh	4	1	0	3	3	11	−8	3
(Syria) Jableh SC	4	0	1	3	5	9	−4	1

9 November 2000

Al-Hilal (Saudi Arabia)	2 – 1	(Kuwait) Al-Arabi
Gato 34'; Al-Temyat 62'		73' Seator

King Fahd International Stadium, Riyadh
Attendance: 8 000
Referee: Said Belqola (Morocco)
9 November 2000

USM Annaba (Algeria)	3 – 2	(Syria) Jableh SC
Soltani 23'; Djabelkheir 38'; El Hadi 66'		10' Al-Mustafa; 85' Al-Basha

Riyadh

9 November 2000

Jableh SC (Syria)	1 – 2	(Kuwait) Al-Arabi
Al-Mustafa 18' (pen.)		82' Hadi; 87' Claudinho

Riyadh
11 November 2000

Al-Hilal (Saudi Arabia)	5 – 0	(Sudan) Al-Merrikh
A. Al-Dosari 61', 90+2'; Gato 72', 75' (pen.); Faye 68'

Riyadh

13 November 2000

Al-Merrikh (Sudan)	2 – 0	(Syria) Jableh SC
Musa 39'; Selter 76'

Riyadh
13 November 2000

Al-Arabi (Kuwait)	2 – 0	(Algeria) USM Annaba
Claudinho 53'; Seator 86'

Riyadh

15 November 2000

Al-Hilal (Saudi Arabia)	2 – 2	(Syria) Jableh SC
A. Al-Dosari 13', 35' (pen.)		9' (pen.), 39' (pen.) Al-Mustafa

Riyadh
15 November 2000

Al-Merrikh (Sudan)	1 – 3	(Algeria) USM Annaba

Riyadh

17 November 2000

Al-Arabi (Kuwait)	3 – 0	(Sudan) Al-Merrikh

Riyadh
17 November 2000

USM Annaba (Algeria)	1 – 2	(Saudi Arabia) Al-Hilal
Boudar 23'		39' A. Al-Dosari; 58' Gato

King Fahd International Stadium, Riyadh

== Knock-out stage ==
Semi-finals
19 November – Riyadh
(Saudi Arabia) Al-Nassr	2
(Kuwait) Al-Arabi	0
19 November – Riyadh
(Saudi Arabia) Al-Hilal (a.e.t.)	1
(Morocco) SCC Mohammédia	0

Final
22 November – Riyadh
(Saudi Arabia) Al-Nassr	1
(Saudi Arabia) Al-Hilal (a.e.t.)	2

=== Semi-finals ===
19 November 2000

Al-Nassr (Saudi Arabia)	2 – 0	(Kuwait) Al-Arabi

King Fahd International Stadium, Riyadh

19 November 2000

Al-Hilal (Saudi Arabia)	1 – 0 (a.e.t.)	(Morocco) SCC Mohammédia
Al-Temyat 118'

King Fahd International Stadium, Riyadh

=== Final ===
22 November 2000

Al-Nassr (Saudi Arabia)	1 – 2 (a.e.t.)	(Saudi Arabia) Al-Hilal
Abu Thnain 53' (o.g.)		11' Al-Shalhoub; 105' (pen.) A. Al-Dosari

King Fahd International Stadium, Riyadh
Attendance: 65 000
Referee: Said Belqola (Morocco)

== Winners ==
2000 Arab Cup Winners' Cup
(Saudi Arabia)
Al-Hilal
First title
