= 1991–92 Moroccan Throne Cup =

Tournament details
- Country: Morocco

Final positions
- Champions: Olympique de Casablanca

The 1991–92 season of the Moroccan Throne Cup was the 36th edition of the competition.

Olympique de Casablanca won the cup, beating Raja Club Athletic 1–0 in a final played at the Stade El Harti in Marrakesh. Olympique de Casablanca won the competition for the third time in their history.

== Competition ==
=== Last 16 ===
Team 1	Team 2	Result
Olympique de Casablanca	USP Police	1–0
Renaissance de Settat	Amal Club de Belksiri	4–0 (Note: Match replayed after 0–0 draw)
Wydad Athletic Club	Fath Union Sport	0–2
Chabab Mohammédia	Rachad Bernoussi	1–0
Kawkab Marrakech	AS Zaza	3–1
KAC Kénitra	Olympique de Khouribga	2–0
Mouloudia Club d'Oujda	Raja Club Athletic	0–2
Raja de Beni Mellal	FAR de Rabat	0–4

=== Quarter-finals ===
Team 1	Team 2	Result
Renaissance de Settat	Olympique de Casablanca	0–2 (Note: Match replayed after 1–1 draw)
Chabab Mohammédia	Fath Union Sport	1–3
Kawkab Marrakech	Raja Club Athletic	0–1
KAC Kénitra	FAR de Rabat	2–1

=== Semi-finals ===
Team 1	Team 2	Result
Olympique de Casablanca	Fath Union Sport	1–0
KAC Kénitra	Raja Club Athletic	1–2

=== Final ===
The final took place between the two winning semi-finalists, Olympique de Casablanca and Raja Club Athletic, on 11 January 1993 at the Stade El Harti in Marrakesh.

11 January 1993
1991–92 Moroccan Throne Cup

Olympique de Casablanca	1–0	Raja Club Athletic
Maybein 77'	Report

Stade El Harti, Marrakesh
Referee: Said Belqola
