= 1982–83 Moroccan Throne Cup =

Tournament details
- Country: Morocco

Final positions
- Champions: Olympique de Casablanca

The 1982–83 season of the Moroccan Throne Cup was the 25th edition of the competition.

Olympique de Casablanca won the competition, beating Raja Club Athletic after a 1–1 draw on penalties (5–4) in the final, played at the stade Mohamed V in Casablanca.

Olympique de Casablanca won the competition for the first time in their history.

== Tournament ==
=== Last 16 ===
Team 1	Team 2	Result
Olympique de Casablanca	Tihad Gharbaoui	3–1
Stade Marocain	Raja Club Athletic	0–2
Renaissance de Berkane	Wydad Athletic Club	1–0
Raja d'Agadir	Union de Sidi Kacem	1–4
TAS de Casablanca	ASFA	1–3
Kifah Sidi Yahia Gharb	Maghreb de Fès	1–2
Difaâ Aïn Sebaâ	CODM Meknès	0–2
Ittihad Riadi Fkih Ben Salah	KAC Kénitra	2–3

=== Quarter-finals ===
Team 1	Team 2	Result
ASFA	Maghreb de Fès	1–0
Olympique de Casablanca	Union de Sidi Kacem	3–1
Renaissance de Berkane	CODM Meknès	0–2
Raja Club Athletic	KAC Kénitra	1–0

=== Semi-finals ===
Team 1	Team 2	Result
Olympique de Casablanca	CODM Meknès	2–1
Raja Club Athletic	ASFA	1–0

=== Final ===
The final took place between the two winning semi-finalists, Olympique de Casablanca and Raja Club Athletic, on 21 August 1983 at the Stade Mohamed V in Casablanca.

1982–83 Moroccan Throne Cup
21 August 1983
Final

Olympique de Casablanca	1–1	Raja Club Athletic
	Report
Penalties
	5-4

Stade Mohamed V, Casablanca
Referee: H'mida Taouil
