= 1996 Arab Cup Winners' Cup =

الكأس العربية للأندية الفائزة بالكؤوس 1996

Tournament details
- Host country: Jordan
- City: Amman
- Dates: 13 – 22 May 1996
- Teams: 8 (from UAFA confederations)
- Venue: 1 (in 1 host city)

Final positions
- Champions: (Morocco) Olympique Khouribga (1st title)
- Runners-up: (Jordan) Al-Faisaly
- Third place: (Saudi Arabia) Al-Riyadh SC
- Fourth place: (Algeria) Olympique Médéa

Tournament statistics
- Matches played: 15
- Goals scored: 48 (3.2 per match)
- Top scorer: (Morocco) Ahmed Bahja (4 goals)
- Best player: (Morocco) El Arbi Hababi
- Best goalkeeper: (Jordan) Anis Shafiq

The 1996 Arab Cup Winners' Cup was the seventh edition of the Arab Cup Winners' Cup held in Amman, Jordan between 13 – 22 May 1996. The teams represented Arab nations from Africa and Asia. Olympique Khouribga from Morocco won the final against Al-Faisaly from Jordan.

== Group stage ==
The height teams were drawn into two groups of five. Each group was played on one leg basis. The winners and runners-up of each group advanced to the semi-finals.

=== Group A ===
Team	Pld	W	D	L	GF	GA	GD	Pts
(Saudi Arabia) Al-Riyadh SC	3	2	1	0	4	1	+3	7
(Algeria) Olympique Médéa	3	2	1	0	6	4	+2	7
(Bahrain) Al-Muharraq	3	1	0	2	4	6	−2	3
(Jordan) Al-Wehdat	3	0	0	3	2	5	−3	0

13 May 1996

Al-Riyadh SC (Saudi Arabia)	2 – 0	(Bahrain) Al-Muharraq

Amman International Stadium, Amman
13 May 1996

Al-Wehdat (Jordan)	1 – 2	(Algeria) Olympique Médéa
J. Abd El-Munaim		Mekhtiche 32'; Djahmoune 90+2'

Amman International Stadium, Amman

15 May 1996

Olympique Médéa (Algeria)	3 – 2	(Bahrain) Al-Muharraq

Amman International Stadium, Amman
15 May 1996

Al-Riyadh SC (Saudi Arabia)	1 – 0	(Jordan) Al-Wehdat

Amman International Stadium, Amman

17 May 1996

Al-Muharraq (Bahrain)	2 – 1	(Jordan) Al-Wehdat
		H. Abd El-Munaim

Amman International Stadium, Amman
17 May 1996

Al-Riyadh SC (Saudi Arabia)	1 – 1	(Algeria) Olympique Médéa
		Aissa 81'

Amman International Stadium, Amman

=== Group B ===
Team	Pld	W	D	L	GF	GA	GD	Pts
(Morocco) Olympique Khouribga	3	2	1	0	6	3	+3	7
(Jordan) Al-Faisaly	3	1	2	0	6	2	+4	5
(Qatar) Al-Ittihad Doha	3	1	1	1	9	4	+5	4
(Sudan) Al-Mourada	3	0	0	3	2	14	−12	0

14 May 1996

Al-Ittihad Doha (Qatar)	0 – 0	(Jordan) Al-Faisaly

Amman International Stadium, Amman
14 May 1996

Olympique Khouribga (Morocco)	2 – 0	(Sudan) Al-Mourada

Amman International Stadium, Amman

16 May 1996

Al-Ittihad Doha (Qatar)	2 – 3	(Morocco) Olympique Khouribga

Amman International Stadium, Amman
16 May 1996

Al-Faisaly (Jordan)	5 – 1	(Sudan) Al-Mourada

Amman International Stadium, Amman

18 May 1996

Al-Ittihad Doha (Qatar)	7 – 1	(Sudan) Al-Mourada

Amman International Stadium, Amman
18 May 1996

Al-Faisaly (Jordan)	1 – 1	(Morocco) Olympique Khouribga

Amman International Stadium, Amman

== Knock-out stage ==
Semi-finals
20 May – Amman
(Saudi Arabia) Al-Riyadh SC	0
(Jordan) Al-Faisaly	1
20 May – Amman
(Morocco) O. Khouribga	2
(Algeria) O. Médéa	1

Final
22 May – Amman
(Jordan) Al-Faisaly	1
(Morocco) O. Khouribga	3

=== Semi-finals ===
20 May 1996

Al-Riyadh SC (Saudi Arabia)	0 – 1	(Jordan) Al-Faisaly
		Sliman 20'

Amman International Stadium, Amman

20 May 1996

Olympique Khouribga (Morocco)	2 – 1	(Algeria) Olympique Médéa
Zarkaoui 69'; Haddoumi 71'		Mekhtiche

Amman International Stadium, Amman

=== Final ===
22 May 1996

Al-Faisaly (Jordan)	1 – 3	(Morocco) Olympique Khouribga
Tadrus 61' (pen.)		Zweine 12'; Hababi 80', 90'

Amman International Stadium, Amman
Attendance: 25,000

== Winners ==
1996 Arab Cup Winners' Cup
(Morocco)
Olympique Khouribga
First title
