= Al-Riyadh SC =

Association football club in Riyadh, Saudi Arabia

Al-Riyadh
- Full name: Al-Riyadh Saudi Club
- Founded: 1953; 73 years ago
- Ground: Prince Faisal bin Fahd Sports City Stadium
- Capacity: 22,188
- Head coach: Maurício Dulac
- League: Saudi Pro League
- 2025–26: Pro League, 15th of 18
- Website: riyadhclub.sa
Home colours	Away colours

Riyadh F.C. or Al-Riyadh (Arabic: نادي الرياض السعودي, romanized: nādī ar-Riyāḍ as-saʿūdī, lit. 'Saudi Riyadh Club') is a professional football club based in Riyadh, Saudi Arabia. It currently plays in the Saudi Pro League (the first tier of professional football in Saudi Arabia). It was established in 1953 as Ahli Al-Riyadh, then changed its name to Al-Yamamah and finally to Al-Riyadh. Best known for its football team, Al-Riyadh also have squads in other sports.

Al-Riyadh have won one major title: the Crown Prince Cup in 1994. The team also finished as runners-up in the Saudi Premier League in 1994; they have never won the top league.

Al-Riyadh was promoted to the Saudi Pro League in 2023.

== History ==
=== Early history ===
The club was founded in 1953 under the name "Ahli Al-Riyadh", before changing to "Al-Yamama" and then to "Al-Riyadh." It is currently based in west Riyadh. They reached the final of the Kings Cup in 1962 and 1978, but triumphed on neither occasion.

=== Golden era ===
Al-Riyadh was promoted to the Saudi Premier League at the end of the 1988/89 season after winning the Saudi First Division League.

In the early 1990s, under the leadership of the Brazilian coach Zumario and players such as Khalid Al-Qarouni, Talal Al-Jabreen, Yasser Al-Taafi and Fahd Al-Hamdan, Al-Riyadh won the Crown Prince Cup in 1994. They were unable to retain the Cup in 1995, losing in the final to Al-Hilal. However, they did win the 1995 Federation Cup and reached the semi-final of the 1995 Asian Cup Winners' Cup. In 1998, Al-Riyadh once again reached the finals of the Crown Prince Cup, and lost to Al-Ahli.

Al-Riyadh were relegated at the end of the 2004/5 season.

=== Return to the top flight ===
Al-Riyadh finished fourth in the Saudi First Division League in the 2022/23 season. Normally, a fourth-place finish would not be good enough for promotion, but the Saudi Premier League was expanding from 16 teams to 18, offering an additional promotion spot.

== Honours ==
=== Domestic ===
- Saudi Premier League (tier 1)
  - Runners-up (1): 1993–94
- Saudi First Division League (tier 2)
  - Winners (2): 1977–78, 1988–89
  - Runners-up (2): 1979–80, 1982–83
- King's Cup
  - Runners-up (2): 1962, 1978
- Crown Prince's Cup
  - Winners (1): 1993–94
  - Runners-up (2): 1994–95, 1997–98
- Saudi Federation Cup
  - Winners (1): 1994–95

=== Continental ===
- Arab Super Cup
  - Runners-up (1): 1996

== Players ==
Note: Flags indicate national team as defined under FIFA eligibility rules; some limited exceptions apply. Players may hold more than one non-FIFA nationality.

No.	Pos.	Nation	Player
2	DF	KSA	Sultan Al-Essa
5	DF	KSA	Hussam Majrashi
6	MF	CIV	Kader Keïta
7	FW	EGY	Trézéguet
9	FW	SEN	Mamadou Sylla
10	FW	FRA	Teddy Okou
11	FW	KSA	Hassan Al-Ali (on loan from Neom)
12	DF	KSA	Sulaiman Hazazi
13	DF	KSA	Osama Al-Bawardi
14	MF	KSA	Essam Bahri
15	MF	JOR	Amin Abu Khalifa
16	MF	KSA	Faisal Al-Sobhi
17	MF	KSA	Hussain Al-Raqwani
19	MF	KSA	Hussain Al-Shurafa
22	MF	ALG	Victor Lekhal
24	MF	KSA	Abdulelah Al-Talea

No.	Pos.	Nation	Player
26	DF	URU	Rodrigo Abascal
28	GK	SLO	Jan Petek
29	MF	KSA	Salman Al-Matar
32	FW	ARG	Luca Ramirez
43	MF	GHA	Bernard Mensah
67	DF	KSA	Mohammed Al-Khaibari
77	FW	POR	Leandro Antunes
79	MF	KSA	Fahad Al-Jizani
82	GK	CAN	Milan Borjan
96	FW	SEN	Cheikh Fall
97	GK	KSA	Emad Al-Feda
—	DF	KSA	Mohammed Al-Shammari
—	DF	MAR	Ahmed Khatir
—	DF	KSA	Awad Dahal
—	DF	KSA	Hussain Qassem (on loan from Al-Fateh)
—	DF	KSA	Yasser Al-Mousa (on loan from Al-Wehda)

=== Out on loan ===
Note: Flags indicate national team as defined under FIFA eligibility rules; some limited exceptions apply. Players may hold more than one non-FIFA nationality.

No.	Pos.	Nation	Player
25	DF	KSA	Suwailem Al-Manhali (at Al-Zulfi)
44	MF	KSA	Saud Al-Tumbukti (at Al-Zulfi)
50	DF	KSA	Nawaf Hawsawi (at Al-Okhdood)

No.	Pos.	Nation	Player
—	MF	KSA	Talal Al-Shubili (at Al-Shabab)
—	MF	KSA	Nasser Al-Bishi (at Al-Okhdood)
—	MF	KSA	Khalil Al-Absi (at [[[Neom SC|Neom]])

== Coaching staff ==
Position	Staff
Head coach	(Brazil) Maurício Dulac
Assistant coach	(Brazil) Vinícius Martins (Brazil) Hércules Júnior (Brazil) Gabriel Silveira (Saudi Arabia) Yaser Al-Harbi
Goalkeeper coach	(Saudi Arabia) Abdullah Al-Sobhi
Fitness coach	(Brazil) Rafael Poffo
Strength and conditioning coach	(Brazil) Admilson Pinheiro (Saudi Arabia) Khaled Al-Shalhoub
Youth coach	(Portugal) Fábio Castro
Development coach	(Saudi Arabia) Bader Al-Koroni
Head of medical	(Saudi Arabia) Ibrahim Al-Khaibari
Doctor	(Brazil) Gustavo Campos (Saudi Arabia) Abdulrahman Al-Mutairi
Sporting director	(Saudi Arabia) Saleh Al-Kubaishan

== Managerial history ==
- (Brazil) Gildo Rodrigues (1989 – 1991)
- (Saudi Arabia) Khalid Al-Koroni (11 January 2010 – 12 April 2010)
- (Saudi Arabia) Fahd Al-Hamdan (caretaker) (12 April 2010 – 1 May 2010)
- (Romania) Marian Bondrea (1 July 2010 – 19 February 2011)
- (Tunisia) Mohamed Aldo (19 February 2011 – 30 May 2011)
- (Tunisia) Djamel Belkacem (26 July 2011 – 30 May 2012)
- (Egypt) Ayman El Yamani (3 July 2012 – 12 December 2012)
- (Tunisia) Habib Ben Romdhane (12 December 2012 – 1 May 2014)
- (Bosnia and Herzegovina) Amir Alagić (17 June 2014 – 15 September 2014)
- (Tunisia) Lotfi Kadri (16 September 2014 – 15 December 2014)
- (Tunisia) Zouhair Louati (15 December 2014 – 28 July 2015)
- (Brazil) Leandro Simpson (7 August 2015 – 18 December 2015)
- (Tunisia) Abderrazek Chebbi (18 December 2015 – 30 April 2016)
- (Saudi Arabia) Sultan Khamees (23 June 2016 – 18 November 2016)
- (Saudi Arabia) Hani Anwar (18 November 2016 – 30 May 2017)
- (Tunisia) Adel Latrach (13 July 2017 – 26 November 2017)
- (Saudi Arabia) Yousef Khamees (26 November 2017 – 14 February 2018)
- (Saudi Arabia) Bandar Al-Jaithen (14 February 2018 – 1 April 2018)
- (Egypt) Amro Anwar (15 August 2018 – 2 December 2018)
- (Saudi Arabia) Bandar Al-Jaithen (2 December 2018 – 27 January 2019)
- (Saudi Arabia) Khalid Al-Koroni (27 January 2019 – 15 October 2019)
- (Saudi Arabia) Saad Al-Subaie (15 October 2019 – 25 January 2020)
- (Tunisia) Yousri bin Kahla (25 January 2020 – 7 February 2021)
- (Tunisia) Anis Chaieb (10 February 2021 – 1 June 2021)
- (Tunisia) Moncef Mcharek (24 June 2021 – 1 May 2022)
- (Serbia) Dejan Arsov (3 May 2022 – 8 September 2022)
- (Croatia) Teo Pirija (caretaker) (8 September 2022 – 18 September 2022)
- (Croatia) Damir Burić (18 September 2022 – 1 June 2023)
- (Belgium) Yannick Ferrera (6 June 2023 – 20 September 2023)
- (Saudi Arabia) Bandar Al-Kubaishan (caretaker) (20 September 2023 – 8 October 2023)
- (Brazil) Odair Hellmann (8 October 2023 – 1 June 2024)
- (France) Sabri Lamouchi (12 July 2024 – 19 April 2025)
- (Saudi Arabia) Bandar Al-Kubaishan (caretaker) (19 April 2025 – 1 June 2025)
- (Spain) Javier Calleja (6 July 2025 – 10 November 2025)
- (Uruguay) José Daniel Carreño (14 November 2025 – 10 February 2026)
- (Brazil) Maurício Dulac (11 February 2026 –)

== International competitions ==
=== Overview ===
As of 1 July 2023

Competition	Pld	W	D	L	GF	GA
Arab Cup Winners' Cup	15	7	2	6	21	18
Arab Super Cup	2	0	2	0	1	1
Asian Cup Winners' Cup	4	3	0	1	7	2
TOTAL	21	10	4	7	29	21

=== Record by country ===
Country	Pld	W	D	L	GF	GA	GD	Win%
Algeria	2	1	1	0	2	1	+1	50.00
Bahrain	1	1	0	0	2	0	+2	100.00
Egypt	2	0	1	1	3	4	−1	0.00
Jordan	2	1	0	1	1	1	+0	50.00
Kuwait	2	1	0	1	2	2	+0	50.00
Lebanon	2	2	0	0	5	0	+5	100.00
Qatar	1	0	0	1	1	3	−2	0.00
Saudi Arabia	1	0	1	0	0	0	+0	0.00
Sudan	1	1	0	0	2	1	+1	100.00
Syria	2	1	0	1	3	2	+1	50.00
Tunisia	3	0	1	2	1	4	−3	0.00
United Arab Emirates	1	1	0	0	2	0	+2	100.00
Yemen	1	1	0	0	5	3	+2	100.00
TOTAL	21	10	4	7	29	21	+8	47.62

=== Matches ===
Season	Competition	Round	Club	Home	Away	Aggregate
1995	Arab Cup Winners' Cup	Group B	(Egypt) Al-Ahly	2–2		2nd
1995	Arab Cup Winners' Cup	Group B	(Tunisia) Club Africain	0–1		2nd
1995	Arab Cup Winners' Cup	Group B	(United Arab Emirates) Al-Nasr	2–0		2nd
1995	Arab Cup Winners' Cup	Group B	(Syria) Al-Ittihad Aleppo	2–0		2nd
1995	Arab Cup Winners' Cup	SF	(Tunisia) ES Sahel	0–2		0–2
1995	Asian Cup Winners' Cup	2R	(Lebanon) Homenmen	3–0	2−0	5–0
1995	Asian Cup Winners' Cup	QF	(Kuwait) Kazma	2–1	0−1	2–2
1995	Asian Cup Winners' Cup	SF	(Iraq) Al-Talaba	–		Withdrew
1996	Arab Super Cup	Final	(Tunisia) ES Tunis	1–1		2nd
1996	Arab Super Cup	Final	(Saudi Arabia) Al-Hilal	0–0		2nd
1996	Arab Cup Winners' Cup	Group A	(Bahrain) Al-Muharraq	2–0		1st
1996	Arab Cup Winners' Cup	Group A	(Jordan) Al-Wehdat	1–0		1st
1996	Arab Cup Winners' Cup	Group A	(Algeria) Olympique Médéa	1–1		1st
1996	Arab Cup Winners' Cup	SF	(Jordan) Al-Faisaly	0–1		0–1
1999	Arab Cup Winners' Cup	QR	(Sudan) Al-Merrikh	2–1		2nd
1999	Arab Cup Winners' Cup	QR	(Egypt) Al-Masry	1–2		2nd
1999	Arab Cup Winners' Cup	QR	(Yemen) Al-Ittihad Ibb	5–3		2nd
1999	Arab Cup Winners' Cup	Group B	(Syria) Al-Jaish	1–2		3rd
1999	Arab Cup Winners' Cup	Group B	(Qatar) Al-Gharafa	1–3		3rd
1999	Arab Cup Winners' Cup	Group B	(Algeria) MC Oran	1–0		3rd

Key: QR – Qualifying round; 1R/2R – First/Second round; R16 – Round of 16; QF – Quarter-final; SF – Semi-final;

Notes

Al-Riyadh advanced after Kazma withdrew.

== See also ==
- Al-Riyadh SC (women)
- List of football clubs in Saudi Arabia
