= Fuad Anwar =

Saudi Arabian footballer

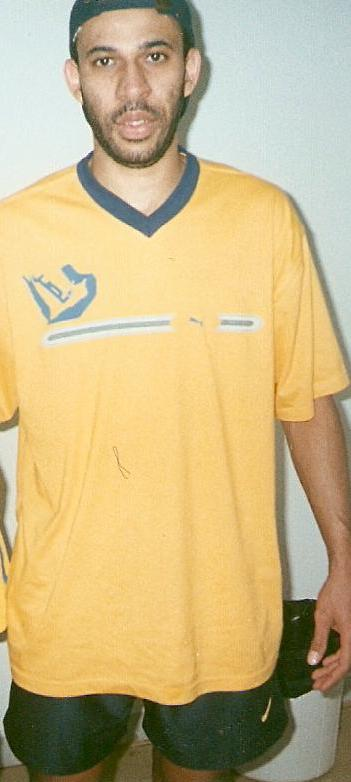
- Amin in 2002

Personal information
- Full name: Fuad Anwar Amin
- Date of birth: 13 October 1972 (age 54)
- Place of birth: Riyadh, Saudi Arabia
- Height: 1.85 m (6 ft 1 in)
- Position: Defensive midfielder

Youth career
- 1987–1990: Al-Shabab

Senior career*
Years	Team	Apps	(Gls)
1990–1998	Al-Shabab	289	(48)
1999	Sichuan	9	(1)
1999–2001	Al Nassr	42	(7)
Total		340	(56)

International career
1988–1989	Saudi Arabia U-17	13	(0)
1989	Saudi Arabia U-20	3	(0)
1995	Saudi Arabia U-23	5	(0)
1996	Saudi Arabia Olympic (O.P.)	3	(1)
1990–1998	Saudi Arabia	95	(12)
Medal record
Men's football
Representing Saudi Arabia
FIFA U-17 World Cup
Winner	1989 Scotland
- * Club domestic league appearances and goals

Fuad Anwar Amin (Arabic: فؤاد أنور أمين; born 13, October 1972) is a former Saudi Arabian footballer who played as a defensive midfielder. He spent the majority of his career with Al-Shabab FC and also had a stint at Al-Nasr FC in Saudi Arabia.

Fuad Anwar captained the Saudi national team and is notable for being the only Saudi player to have participated in the FIFA World Cup across all age categories, including the FIFA Club World Cup. He made history by scoring the first-ever World Cup goal for Saudi Arabia and was the first Saudi player to embark on an international professional career, playing for Shuang Club in China.

In 2018, a retirement festival for Fuad Anwar featured a match between Egypt’s Al-Ahly and Al-Shabab FC at Prince Faisal Bin Fahd Stadium in Riyadh, under the attended by Saudi football stars.

== International career ==
A former captain of the national team, he achieved national fame after becoming the first Saudi to score in the FIFA World Cup finals in the 2–1 defeat against the Netherlands during 1994 edition. In the same competition, he scored a long range effort against Morocco.

Amin played at the 1996 Summer Olympics.

Amin was also selected for 1998 FIFA World Cup. During the match against France, Amin was stomped by Zidane, who was banned for two games. People close to Zidane said that Amin had leveled a racial slur against the player.

== Honours ==
Al-Shabab

- Saudi Federation Cup: 1988, 1989
- Saudi Premier League: 1991, 1992, 1993
- Saudi Crown Prince Cup: 1993, 1996
- Arab Club Champions Cup: 1992
- Arab Super Cup: 1996
- GCC Club Championship: 1993, 1994

Saudi Arabia U17

- AFC U-17 Championship: 1988
- FIFA U-17 World Cup: 1989

Saudi Arabia

- AFC Asian Cup: 1996
- Arabian Gulf Cup: 1994

Individual

- Arabian Gulf Cup top scorer: 1994
- AFC Fans' All-time XI at the FIFA World Cup: 2020
