= 1989 Arab Club Champions Cup =

كأس العرب للأندية الأبطال 1989

Tournament details
- Host country: Morocco
- City: Marrakesh
- Dates: 19 November – 2 December
- Teams: 10 (from 2 confederations) (from 8 associations)
- Venue: (in 1 host city)

Final positions
- Champions: (Morocco) Wydad Athletic Club (1st title)
- Runners-up: (Saudi Arabia) Al-Hilal
- Third place: (Algeria) JS Kabylie
- Fourth place: (Tunisia) Étoile du Sahel

The 1989 Arab Club Champions Cup was played in Morocco in the city of Marrakesh. Wydad Athletic Club won the competition for the first time beating in the final Al-Hilal.

== Participants ==
Participants
| Zone | Team | Qualifying method |
|---|---|---|
| | (Morocco) Kawkab Marrakech | Hosts |
| | (Saudi Arabia) Al-Ettifaq | Holders |
| Zone 1 | (Bahrain) Al-Muharraq | 1987–88 Bahraini Premier League winners |
| Zone 1 | (Oman) Fanja SC | 1987–88 Omani League winners |
| Zone 2 | (Egypt) Al Ahly | 1987–88 Egyptian Premier League runners-up |
| Zone 2 | (Saudi Arabia) Al-Hilal | 1987–88 Saudi Premier League winners |
| Zone 2 | (Somalia) Al-Matabeh | Somali First Division representative |
| Zone 2 | (Sudan) Al-Mourada | 1987–88 Sudan Premier League winners |
| Zone 3 | (Algeria) JS Kabylie | 1987–88 Algerian Championnat National runners-up |
| Zone 3 | (Morocco) CLAS Casablanca | Moroccan Championship Sixth place |
| Zone 3 | (Morocco) Wydad Athletic Club | Moroccan Throne Cup winners |
| Zone 3 | (Tunisia) Étoile du Sahel | 1987–88 Tunisian Championship Fifth place |
| Zone 4 | (Iraq) Al-Tayaran | 1987–88 Iraqi League Third place |
| Zone 4 | (Lebanon) Al-Ansar SC | 1987–88 Lebanese Premier League winners |

== Preliminary round ==
=== Zone 1 (Gulf Area) ===
Al-Muharraq and Fanja SC advanced to the final tournament.

=== Zone 2 (Red Sea) ===
Preliminary round tournament held in Riyadh, Saudi Arabia.

| Team | Pld | W | D | L | GF | GA | GD | Pts |
|---|---|---|---|---|---|---|---|---|
| (Saudi Arabia) Al-Hilal | 3 | 2 | 1 | 0 | 12 | 2 | +10 | 5 |
| (Egypt) Al Ahly (Note: Al Ahly withdrew from the final tournament after qualification, it had been replaced by Wydad Casablanca.) | 3 | 2 | 1 | 0 | 12 | 3 | +9 | 5 |
| (Sudan) Al-Mourada | 3 | 1 | 0 | 2 | 6 | 6 | 0 | 2 |
| (Somalia) Al-Matabeh | 3 | 0 | 0 | 3 | 4 | 23 | −19 | 0 |

Notes:
27 July 1989

| Al-Hilal (Saudi Arabia) | 2 – 0 | (Sudan) Al-Mourada |

Riyadh
28 July 1989

| Al Ahly (Egypt) | 9 – 1 | (Somalia) Al-Matabeh |

Riyadh

30 July 1989

| Al-Hilal (Saudi Arabia) | 1 – 1 | (Egypt) Al Ahly |

Riyadh
31 July 1989

| Al-Mourada (Sudan) | 5 – 2 | (Somalia) Al-Matabeh |

Riyadh

1 August 1989

| Al Ahly (Egypt) | 2 – 1 | (Sudan) Al-Mourada |

Riyadh
2 August 1989

| Al-Hilal (Saudi Arabia) | 9 – 1 | (Somalia) Al-Matabeh |

Riyadh

Al-Hilal advanced to the final tournament. Al Ahly withdrew from the final tournament after qualification, it had been replaced by Wydad Casablanca.

=== Zone 3 (North Africa) ===
Preliminary round tournament held in Sousse, Tunisia.

| Team | Pld | W | D | L | GF | GA | GD | Pts |
|---|---|---|---|---|---|---|---|---|
| (Tunisia) Étoile du Sahel | 2 | 1 | 1 | 0 | 3 | 1 | +2 | 3 |
| (Algeria) JS Tizi Ouzou | 2 | 0 | 2 | 0 | 3 | 3 | 0 | 2 |
| (Morocco) CLAS Casablanca | 2 | 0 | 1 | 1 | 2 | 5 | −3 | 1 |

| Étoile du Sahel (Tunisia) | 1 – 1 | (Algeria) JS Tizi Ouzou |
|---|---|---|
| Bouazra (–) | | – (–) |

Stade Olympique de Sousse, Sousse

| Étoile du Sahel (Tunisia) | 3 – 0 | (Morocco) CLAS Casablanca |
|---|---|---|
| Hsoumi (–); Dermech (–) |

Stade Olympique de Sousse, Sousse

| JS Tizi Ouzou (Algeria) | 2 – 2 | (Morocco) CLAS Casablanca |
|---|---|---|
| Djahnit 18'; Haffaf 44' | | – (–) – (–) |

Stade Olympique de Sousse, Sousse

JS Tizi Ouzou and Étoile du Sahel advanced to the final tournament.
JS Tizi Ouzou renamed JS Kabylie from the season 1989-90 and played under this name in the final tournament.

=== Zone 4 (East Region) ===
Preliminary round tournament held in Baghdad, Iraq. Syria, Jordan and Palestine withdrew their participant.

| Team | Pld | W | D | L | GF | GA | GD | Pts |
|---|---|---|---|---|---|---|---|---|
| (Iraq) Al-Tayaran | 2 | 2 | 0 | 0 | 3 | 0 | +3 | 4 |
| (Lebanon) Al-Ansar | 2 | 0 | 0 | 2 | 0 | 3 | −3 | 0 |

4 August 1989

| Al-Ansar (Lebanon) | 0 – 2 | (Iraq) Al-Tayaran |
|---|---|---|
| | | Hamad (–) |

Al-Rasheed Stadium, Baghdad
6 August 1989

| Al-Tayaran (Iraq) | 1 – 0 | (Lebanon) Al-Ansar |
|---|---|---|
| Hashim 53' (pen.) |

Al-Rasheed Stadium, Baghdad

Al-Tayaran and Al-Ansar SC advanced to the final tournament.

== Final Tournament ==
Final tournament held in Marrakesh, Morocco from 19 November to 2 December 1989.

=== Group stage ===
==== Group A ====
| Team | Pld | W | D | L | GF | GA | GD | Pts |
|---|---|---|---|---|---|---|---|---|
| (Algeria) JS Kabylie | 4 | 1 | 3 | 0 | 4 | 3 | +1 | 5 |
| (Saudi Arabia) Al-Hilal (Note: Al-Hilal qualified after a drawing of lots with Al-Tayaran.) | 4 | 2 | 0 | 2 | 6 | 4 | +2 | 4 |
| (Iraq) Al-Tayaran | 4 | 1 | 2 | 1 | 6 | 4 | +2 | 4 |
| (Morocco) Kawkab Marrakech | 4 | 1 | 2 | 1 | 4 | 6 | −2 | 4 |
| (Bahrain) Al-Muharraq | 4 | 1 | 1 | 2 | 2 | 5 | −3 | 3 |

Notes:

| Kawkab Marrakech (Morocco) | 1 – 4 | (Saudi Arabia) Al-Hilal |

El Harti Stadium, Marrakesh
21 November 1989

| JS Kabylie (Algeria) | 1 – 1 | (Iraq) Al-Tayaran |
|---|---|---|
| – (–) | | Hamad (–) |

El Harti Stadium, Marrakesh

23 November 1989

| Al-Hilal (Saudi Arabia) | 1 – 0 | (Iraq) Al-Tayaran |

El Harti Stadium, Marrakesh

| Kawkab Marrakech (Morocco) | 1 – 0 | (Bahrain) Al-Muharraq |

El Harti Stadium, Marrakesh

| JS Kabylie (Algeria) | 1 – 1 | (Bahrain) Al-Muharraq |

El Harti Stadium, Marrakesh

| Kawkab Marrakech (Morocco) | 2 – 2 | (Iraq) Al-Tayaran |
|---|---|---|
| – (–) – (–) | | Hamad (–) |

El Harti Stadium, Marrakesh

| Kawkab Marrakech (Morocco) | 0 – 0 | (Algeria) JS Kabylie |

El Harti Stadium, Marrakesh

| Al-Hilal (Saudi Arabia) | 0 – 1 | (Bahrain) Al-Muharraq |

El Harti Stadium, Marrakesh

27 November 1989

| Al-Tayaran (Iraq) | 3 – 0 | (Bahrain) Al-Muharraq |
|---|---|---|
| Hamad (–); Hashim (–) |

El Harti Stadium, Marrakesh
27 November 1989

| JS Kabylie (Algeria) | 2 – 1 | (Saudi Arabia) Al-Hilal |
|---|---|---|
| Saïb 22'; Meftah 80' | | Al-Habashi 6' |

El Harti Stadium, Marrakesh
Referee: Yousef Belal (Libya)

==== Group B ====
| Team | Pld | W | D | L | GF | GA | GD | Pts |
|---|---|---|---|---|---|---|---|---|
| (Tunisia) Étoile du Sahel | 4 | 2 | 2 | 0 | 7 | 4 | +3 | 6 |
| (Morocco) Wydad Casablanca | 4 | 2 | 1 | 1 | 5 | 3 | +2 | 5 |
| (Saudi Arabia) Al-Ettifaq | 4 | 1 | 2 | 1 | 4 | 4 | 0 | 4 |
| (Lebanon) Al-Ansar | 4 | 1 | 2 | 1 | 4 | 5 | −1 | 4 |
| (Oman) Fanja SC | 4 | 0 | 1 | 3 | 0 | 4 | −4 | 1 |

| Al-Ansar (Lebanon) | 2 – 2 | (Tunisia) Étoile du Sahel |
|---|---|---|
| – (–) – (–) | | Brigui (–) |

Casablanca

| Al-Ettifaq (Saudi Arabia) | 0 – 2 | (Morocco) Wydad Casablanca |

Casablanca

| Al-Ettifaq (Saudi Arabia) | 1 – 1 | (Tunisia) Étoile du Sahel |
|---|---|---|
| – (–) | | Brigui (–) |

Casablanca

| Wydad Casablanca (Morocco) | 0 – 0 | (Oman) Fanja SC |

Casablanca

| Al-Ettifaq (Saudi Arabia) | 2 – 0 | (Oman) Fanja SC |

Casablanca

| Al-Ansar (Lebanon) | 0 – 2 | (Morocco) Wydad Casablanca |

Casablanca

| Étoile du Sahel (Tunisia) | 3 – 1 | (Morocco) Wydad Casablanca |
|---|---|---|
| Hsoumi (–); Gabsi (–); Dermech (–) | | – (–) |

Casablanca

| Al-Ansar (Lebanon) | 1 – 0 | (Oman) Fanja SC |

Casablanca

| Al-Ansar (Lebanon) | 1 – 1 | (Saudi Arabia) Al-Ettifaq |

Casablanca

| Étoile du Sahel (Tunisia) | 1 – 0 | (Oman) Fanja SC |
|---|---|---|
| Brigui (–) | | – (–) |

Casablanca

== Knockout stage ==
=== Bracket ===
Semi-finals
– Marrakesh
(Tunisia) Étoile du Sahel (p) | 0 (4)
(Saudi Arabia) Al-Hilal | 0 (5)
– Marrakesh
(Algeria) JS Kabylie | 2
(Morocco) Wydad Casablanca | 3

Final
2 December – Marrakesh
(Saudi Arabia) Al-Hilal | 1
(Morocco) Wydad Casablanca | 3
Third place
– Marrakesh
(Tunisia) Étoile du Sahel | 0
(Algeria) JS Kabylie | 1

==== Semi-finals ====
| Étoile du Sahel (Tunisia) | 0 – 0 | (Saudi Arabia) Al-Hilal |
Penalties
| | 4 – 5 |

El Harti Stadium, Marrakesh

| JS Kabylie (Algeria) | 2 – 3 | (Morocco) Wydad Casablanca |

El Harti Stadium, Marrakesh

==== Third place match ====
| Étoile du Sahel (Tunisia) | 0 – 1 | (Algeria) JS Kabylie |

El Harti Stadium, Marrakesh

==== Final ====
2 December 1989

| Al-Hilal (Saudi Arabia) | 1 – 3 | (Morocco) Wydad Casablanca |
|---|---|---|
| Al-Temawi 84' | | Nader 10'; N'Daw 53', 80' |

El Harti Stadium, Marrakesh
Referee: Osama Al Shami (Syria)

== Winners ==
1989 Arab Club Champions Cup winners
(Morocco)
Wydad Casablanca
First title
