= Ayman El Yamani =

Egyptian footballer and manager

Personal information
- Place of birth: Egypt
- Position: Midfielder

Senior career*
Years	Team	Apps	(Gls)
- Zamalek

Managerial career
- 2002–2003: CD Costa Do Sol
- 2004–2005: Mozambique
- 2006–2007: Swaziland
- 2009: Hearts of Oak
- * Club domestic league appearances and goals

Ayman El Yamani (Arabic: أيمن اليماني) is an Egyptian former football player and manager. He last managed Hearts of Oak in the Ghanaian Premier League.

== Coaching career ==
Becoming Hearts of Oak coach in September 2009, he vowed to build a team comparable to the Hearts side that won the 2000 CAF Champions League.

By beating Asante Kotoko, El Yamani strengthened his position as coach and confuted rumors about to his dismissal. However, he did not have any chemistry with the players and did not have a hand in signing or selling players to help Hearts of Oak. Around two months after his appointment, he was relieved of his duties with a record of four defeats, two draws, and five wins in 11 matches and has looked for a Kenyan club.
