= 1992 Arab Cup Winners' Cup =

الكأس العربية للأندية الفائزة بالكؤوس 1992

Tournament details
- Host country: Saudi Arabia
- City: Jeddah
- Dates: 18 – 27 Nov 1993
- Teams: 7 (from 1 association)

Final positions
- Champions: (Morocco) CO Casablanca (2nd title)
- Runners-up: (Qatar) Al-Sadd

Tournament statistics
- Matches played: 12
- Goals scored: 35 (2.92 per match)
- Top scorer(s): (Saudi Arabia) Abdallah Fual (Morocco) Hassan Bourouaine (Morocco) Aziz Ouzougate (Qatar) Ishaq Madjarah (3 goals each)
- Best player: (Morocco) Aziz Ouzougate
- Best goalkeeper: (Qatar) Murtada Qamsher

The 1992 Arab Cup Winners' Cup was the third edition of the Arab Cup Winners' Cup held in Jeddah, Saudi Arabia for the second time between 18 – 27 Nov 1993, one year after. The teams represented Arab nations from Africa and Asia. CO Casablanca of Morocco won the final for the second time against Al-Sadd of Qatar.

== Preliminary round ==
=== Zone 1 (Gulf Area) ===
Al-Sadd qualified for the final tournament after successfully competing in the preliminary rounds. Their performance secured them a place in the group stage of the competition.

Group Stage In the group stage, Al-Sadd was placed in Group 2 alongside CO Casablanca from Morocco, Al-Merrikh from Sudan, and Haifa SC from Palestine. Al-Sadd's notable performance in this stage included a significant 5-0 victory over Haifa SC, which helped them advance further in the tournament.

Final Al-Sadd reached the final of the 1992 Arab Cup Winners' Cup, where they faced CO Casablanca. Despite a strong effort, Al-Sadd was defeated by CO Casablanca, who won the match 2-0, securing their second title in the tournament's history.

=== Zone 2 (Red Sea) ===
Preliminary tournament held in Cairo, Egypt.

Team	Pld	W	D	L	GF	GA	GD	Pts
(Egypt) Al Ahly (H)	2	1	1	0	5	2	+3	3
(Saudi Arabia) Al-Ittihad Jeddah	2	0	2	0	3	3	0	2
(Sudan) Al-Merrikh	2	0	1	1	1	4	−3	1

(H) Hosts
21 August 1992

Al Ahly (Egypt)	2 – 2	(Saudi Arabia) Al-Ittihad Jeddah
Khashaba; Shawky		Al-Shamrani; Basas 79' (pen.)

Cairo International Stadium, Cairo
Referee: Rachid Medjiba (Algeria)

... August 1992

Al-Ittihad Jeddah (Saudi Arabia)	1 – 1	(Sudan) Al-Merrikh
Rayhan 19' (pen.)		Zico 28'

Cairo International Stadium, Cairo
Referee: Yousef Bilal (Libya)

... August 1992

Al Ahly (Egypt)	3 – 0	(Sudan) Al-Merrikh
H. Hassan 33', 87'; Shawky

Cairo International Stadium, Cairo
Referee: Ahmed Ibrahim Hakeem (United Arab Emirates)

Al-Ittihad Jeddah & Al Ahly advanced to the final tournament. But Al-Merrikh replaced Al Ahly aftrer his withrawal.

=== Zone 3 (North Africa) ===
CO Casablanca & AS Marsa advanced to the final tournament.

=== Zone 4 (East Region) ===
Al-Ramtha & Haifa SC advanced to the final tournament.

== Group stage ==
=== Group 1 ===
Team	Pld	W	D	L	GF	GA	GD	Pts
(Saudi Arabia) Al-Ittihad Jeddah	2	2	0	0	6	1	+5	4
(Tunisia) AS Marsa	2	1	0	1	4	3	+1	2
(Jordan) Al-Ramtha SC	2	0	0	2	0	6	−6	0

18 November 1993

Al-Ittihad Jeddah (Saudi Arabia)	4 – 1	(Tunisia) AS Marsa

Prince Abdullah Al Faisal Stadium, Jeddah

20 November 1993

AS Marsa (Tunisia)	4 – 0	(Jordan) Al-Ramtha SC

Prince Abdullah Al Faisal Stadium, Jeddah

22 November 1993

Al-Ittihad Jeddah (Saudi Arabia)	2 – 0	(Jordan) Al-Ramtha SC

Prince Abdullah Al Faisal Stadium, Jeddah

=== Group 2 ===
Team	Pld	W	D	L	GF	GA	GD	Pts
(Morocco) CO Casablanca	3	2	1	0	5	0	+5	5
(Qatar) Al-Sadd	3	1	1	1	6	4	+2	3
(Sudan) Al-Merrikh	3	0	2	1	2	4	−2	2
(Palestine) Haifa SC	3	0	2	1	1	6	−5	2

19 November 1993

CO Casablanca (Morocco)	3 – 0	(Qatar) Al-Sadd

Prince Abdullah Al Faisal Stadium, Jeddah
19 November 1993

Haifa SC (Palestine)	1 – 1	(Sudan) Al-Merrikh

Prince Abdullah Al Faisal Stadium, Jeddah

21 November 1993

Al-Merrikh (Sudan)	0 – 2	(Morocco) CO Casablanca

Prince Abdullah Al Faisal Stadium, Jeddah
21 November 1993

Haifa SC (Palestine)	0 – 5	(Qatar) Al-Sadd

Prince Abdullah Al Faisal Stadium, Jeddah

23 November 1993

CO Casablanca (Morocco)	0 – 0	(Palestine) Haifa SC

Prince Abdullah Al Faisal Stadium, Jeddah
23 November 1993

Al-Sadd (Qatar)	1 – 1	(Sudan) Al-Merrikh

Prince Abdullah Al Faisal Stadium, Jeddah

== Knock-out stage ==
Semi-finals
25 November – Jeddah
(Saudi Arabia) Al-Ittihad Jeddah	1
(Qatar) Al-Sadd	2
25 November – Jeddah
(Morocco) CO Casablanca	4
(Tunisia) AS Marsa	1

Final
27 November – Jeddah
(Qatar) Al-Sadd	0
(Morocco) CO Casablanca (a.e.t.)	2

=== Semi-finals ===
25 November 1993

Al-Ittihad Jeddah (Saudi Arabia)	1 – 2	(Qatar) Al-Sadd

Prince Abdullah Al Faisal Stadium, Jeddah

25 November 1993

CO Casablanca (Morocco)	4 – 1	(Tunisia) AS Marsa

Prince Abdullah Al Faisal Stadium, Jeddah

=== Final ===
27 November 1993

Al-Sadd (Qatar)	0 – 2 (a.e.t.)	(Morocco) CO Casablanca
		Mgaiwa 108', 113'

Prince Abdullah Al Faisal Stadium, Jeddah
Referee: Rachid Medjiba (Algeria)

Public information of Group 1, Group 2, and Semi-Final scores are available on The Rec.Sport.Soccer Statistics Foundation website.

== Winners ==
1992 Arab Cup Winners' Cup
(Morocco)
CO Casablanca
Second title
