= Naser Al-Halawi =

Saudi Arabian footballer

Nasser Al-Halawi
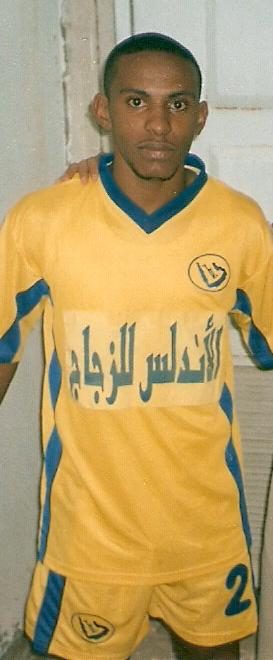

Personal information
- Full name: Nasser Al-Halawi
- Date of birth: January 10, 1979 (age 47)
- Place of birth: Riyadh, Saudi Arabia
- Position: Defender

Senior career*
Years	Team	Apps	(Gls)
???–2006	Al-Nassr	?	(?)
2006–2007	Al-Faisaly	?	(?)
2007–2008	Najran	?	(?)
2008–2009	Al-Watani	?	(?)
2009–2010	Al-Faisaly	?	(?)
2010–2012	Al-Asyah	?	(?)
2012–2013	Al-Diriyah		
2013–2015	Al-Washm		
2015–2016	Al-Waseel		

International career
2003	Saudi Arabia	4	(0)
- * Club domestic league appearances and goals

Naser Al-Halawi (Arabic: ناصر الحلوي; born January 10, 1979) is a Saudi Arabian footballer who playing with Al-Faisaly (Harmah), he was playing for many clubs including Al-Nassr.
