= 1993 Arab Cup Winners' Cup =

الكأس العربية للأندية الفائزة بالكؤوس 1993

Tournament details
- Host country: Qatar
- City: Doha
- Dates: 20 Jan – 2 Feb 1994
- Teams: 10 (from 1 association)

Final positions
- Champions: (Morocco) CO Casablanca (3rd title)
- Runners-up: (Saudi Arabia) Al-Qadisiyah

Tournament statistics
- Matches played: 23
- Goals scored: 56 (2.43 per match)
- Top scorer: (Sudan) Mohamed Ahmed Baris (4 goals)
- Best player: (Morocco) Hassan Bourouaine
- Best goalkeeper: (Qatar) Ahmed Ghulam

The 1993 Arab Cup Winners' Cup was the fourth edition of the Arab Cup Winners' Cup held in Doha, Qatar between 20 Jan – 2 Feb 1994, one year after. The teams represented Arab nations from Africa and Asia. CO Casablanca of Morocco won the final consecutively for the third time, against Al-Qadisiyah of Saudi Arabia.

== Group stage ==
=== Group 1 ===
Team	Pld	W	D	L	GF	GA	GD	Pts
(Sudan) Al-Mourada	4	3	1	0	8	3	+5	7
(Tunisia) ES Sahel	4	2	2	0	7	5	+2	6
(Qatar) Al-Ahli Doha	4	2	1	1	9	5	+4	5
(Kuwait) Al-Salmiya	4	0	1	3	3	7	−4	1
(Jordan) Al-Faisaly	4	0	1	3	3	10	−7	1

20 January 1994

ES Sahel (Tunisia)	1 – 1	(Sudan) Al-Mourada

Hamad bin Khalifa Stadium, Doha
20 January 1994

Al-Ahli Doha (Qatar)	3 – 0	(Jordan) Al-Faisaly

Hamad bin Khalifa Stadium, Doha

22 January 1994

Al-Ahli Doha (Qatar)	1 – 2	(Sudan) Al-Mourada

Hamad bin Khalifa Stadium, Doha
22 January 1994

ES Sahel (Tunisia)	2 – 0	(Kuwait) Al-Salmiya

Hamad bin Khalifa Stadium, Doha

24 January 1994

Al-Faisaly (Jordan)	1 – 2	(Tunisia) ES Sahel

Hamad bin Khalifa Stadium, Doha
24 January 1994

Al-Salmiya (Kuwait)	0 – 1	(Sudan) Al-Mourada

Hamad bin Khalifa Stadium, Doha

26 January 1994

Al-Ahli Doha (Qatar)	2 – 2	(Tunisia) ES Sahel

Hamad bin Khalifa Stadium, Doha
26 January 1994

Al-Salmiya (Kuwait)	1 – 1	(Jordan) Al-Faisaly

Hamad bin Khalifa Stadium, Doha

28 January 1994

Al-Faisaly (Jordan)	0 – 1	(Sudan) Al-Mourada

Hamad bin Khalifa Stadium, Doha
28 January 1994

Al-Ahli Doha (Qatar)	1 – 1	(Kuwait) Al-Salmiya

Hamad bin Khalifa Stadium, Doha

=== Group 2 ===
Team	Pld	W	D	L	GF	GA	GD	Pts
(Morocco) CO Casablanca	4	3	1	0	6	0	+6	7
(Saudi Arabia) Al-Qadisiyah	4	2	1	1	7	3	+4	5
(Algeria) ASO Chlef	4	2	1	1	5	4	+1	5
(Palestine) Haifa SC	4	1	0	3	2	6	−4	2
(United Arab Emirates) Al-Nasr Dubai	4	0	1	3	0	7	−7	1

21 January 1994

CO Casablanca (Morocco)	4 – 0	(United Arab Emirates) Al-Nasr Dubai

Hamad bin Khalifa Stadium, Doha
21 January 1994

ASO Chlef (Algeria)	2 – 0	(Palestine) Haifa SC

Hamad bin Khalifa Stadium, Doha

23 January 1994

Al-Qadisiyah (Saudi Arabia)	4 – 2	(Algeria) ASO Chlef

Hamad bin Khalifa Stadium, Doha
23 January 1994

CO Casablanca (Morocco)	1 – 0	(Palestine) Haifa SC

Hamad bin Khalifa Stadium, Doha

25 January 1994

ASO Chlef (Algeria)	1 – 0	(United Arab Emirates) Al-Nasr Dubai

Hamad bin Khalifa Stadium, Doha
25 January 1994

Haifa SC (Palestine)	0 – 3	(Saudi Arabia) Al-Qadisiyah

Hamad bin Khalifa Stadium, Doha

27 January 1994

Haifa SC (Palestine)	2 – 0	(United Arab Emirates) Al-Nasr Dubai

Hamad bin Khalifa Stadium, Doha
27 January 1994

CO Casablanca (Morocco)	1 – 0	(Saudi Arabia) Al-Qadisiyah

Hamad bin Khalifa Stadium, Doha

29 January 1994

ASO Chlef (Algeria)	0 – 0	(Morocco) CO Casablanca

Hamad bin Khalifa Stadium, Doha
29 January 1994

Al-Qadisiyah (Saudi Arabia)	0 – 0	(United Arab Emirates) Al-Nasr Dubai

Hamad bin Khalifa Stadium, Doha

== Knock-out stage ==
Semi-finals
31 January – Doha
(Sudan) Al-Mourada	0
(Saudi Arabia) Al-Qadisiyah	3
31 January – Doha
(Morocco) CO Casablanca	1
(Tunisia) ES Sahel	0

Final
2 February – Doha
(Saudi Arabia) Al-Qadisiyah	0
(Morocco) CO Casablanca	1

=== Semi-finals ===
31 January 1994

Al-Mourada (Sudan)	0 – 3	(Saudi Arabia) Al-Qadisiyah

Hamad bin Khalifa Stadium, Doha

31 January 1994

CO Casablanca (Morocco)	1 – 0	(Tunisia) ES Sahel

Hamad bin Khalifa Stadium, Doha

=== Final ===
2 February 1994

Al-Qadisiyah (Saudi Arabia)	0 – 1	(Morocco) CO Casablanca
		Bellagha 36'

Hamad bin Khalifa Stadium, Doha
Referee: Jamal Al Sharif (Syria)

== Winners ==
1993 Arab Cup Winners' Cup
(Morocco)
CO Casablanca
Third title
