= 1995 Arab Cup Winners' Cup =

الكأس العربية للأندية الفائزة بالكؤوس 1995

Tournament details
- Host country: Tunisia
- City: Sousse
- Dates: 29 Sep – 12 Oct 1995
- Teams: 10 (from UAFA confederations)
- Venue: 1 (in 1 host city)

Final positions
- Champions: (Tunisia) Club Africain (1st title)
- Runners-up: (Tunisia) ES Sahel
- Third place: (Saudi Arabia) Al-Riyadh SC
- Fourth place: (Egypt) Ghazl El-Mehalla

Tournament statistics
- Matches played: 23
- Goals scored: 51 (2.22 per match)
- Top scorer: (Tunisia) Imed Ben Younes (... goals)
- Best player: (Tunisia) Imed Ben Younes
- Best goalkeeper: (Saudi Arabia) Ibrahim Al-Helwah

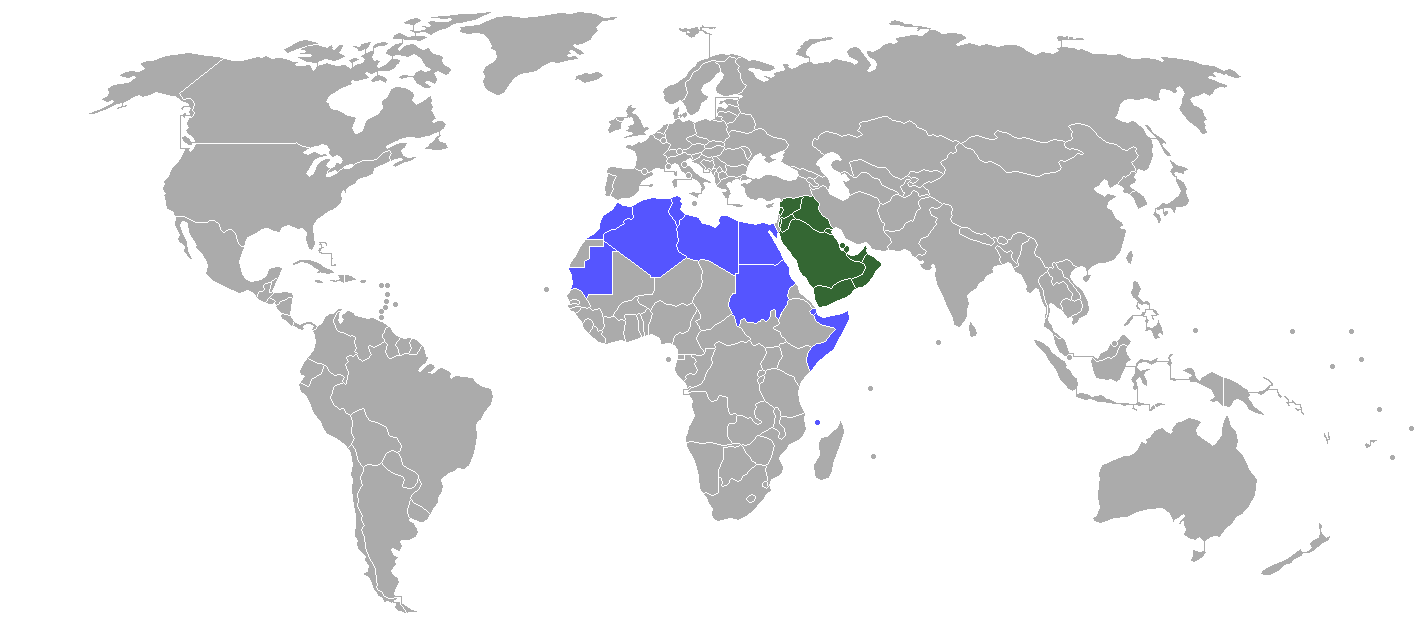
Map of Members of Union of Arab Football Associations

The 1995 Arab Cup Winners' Cup was the sixth edition of the Arab Cup Winners' Cup held in Sousse, Tunisia between 29 Sep – 12 Oct 1995. The teams represented Arab nations from Africa and Asia. Club Africain won the final against ES Sahel, both from Tunisia.

== Group stage ==
The ten teams were drawn into two groups of five. Each group was played on one leg basis. The winners and runners-up of each group advanced to the semi-finals.

=== Group A ===
| Team | Pld | W | D | L | GF | GA | GD | Pts |
|---|---|---|---|---|---|---|---|---|
| (Tunisia) ES Sahel | 4 | 4 | 0 | 0 | 6 | 0 | +6 | 12 |
| (Egypt) Ghazl El-Mehalla | 4 | 2 | 1 | 1 | 4 | 2 | +2 | 7 |
| (Jordan) Al-Faisaly | 4 | 1 | 1 | 2 | 5 | 7 | −2 | 4 |
| (Kuwait) Kazma SC | 4 | 0 | 2 | 2 | 4 | 7 | −3 | 2 |
| (Algeria) AS Aïn M'lila | 4 | 0 | 2 | 2 | 2 | 5 | −3 | 2 |

29 September 1995

| Ghazl El-Mehalla (Egypt) | 1 – 0 | (Algeria) AS Aïn M'lila |

Stade Olympique de Sousse, Sousse
29 September 1995

| ES Sahel (Tunisia) | 1 – 0 | (Kuwait) Kazma SC |

Stade Olympique de Sousse, Sousse

30 September 1995

| Al-Faisaly (Jordan) | 1 – 1 | (Algeria) AS Aïn M'lila |

Stade Olympique de Sousse, Sousse
30 September 1995

| ES Sahel (Tunisia) | 1 – 0 | (Egypt) Ghazl El-Mehalla |

Stade Olympique de Sousse, Sousse

2 October 1995

| Kazma SC (Kuwait) | 1 – 1 | (Algeria) AS Aïn M'lila |

Stade Olympique de Sousse, Sousse
2 October 1995

| Ghazl El-Mehalla (Egypt) | 2 – 0 | (Jordan) Al-Faisaly |

Stade Olympique de Sousse, Sousse

4 October 1995

| ES Sahel (Tunisia) | 2 – 0 | (Jordan) Al-Faisaly |

Stade Olympique de Sousse, Sousse
4 October 1995

| Ghazl El-Mehalla (Egypt) | 1 – 1 | (Kuwait) Kazma SC |

Stade Olympique de Sousse, Sousse

6 October 1995

| ES Sahel (Tunisia) | 2 – 0 | (Algeria) AS Aïn M'lila |

Stade Olympique de Sousse, Sousse
6 October 1995

| Al-Faisaly (Jordan) | 4 – 2 | (Kuwait) Kazma SC |

Stade Olympique de Sousse, Sousse

=== Group B ===
| Team | Pld | W | D | L | GF | GA | GD | Pts |
|---|---|---|---|---|---|---|---|---|
| (Tunisia) Club Africain | 4 | 4 | 0 | 0 | 8 | 2 | +6 | 12 |
| (Saudi Arabia) Al-Riyadh SC | 4 | 2 | 1 | 1 | 6 | 3 | +3 | 7 |
| (Egypt) Al Ahly | 4 | 2 | 1 | 1 | 7 | 7 | 0 | 7 |
| (Syria) Al-Ittihad Aleppo | 4 | 1 | 0 | 3 | 3 | 4 | −1 | 3 |
| (United Arab Emirates) Al-Nasr Dubai | 4 | 0 | 0 | 4 | 2 | 10 | −8 | 0 |

30 September 1995

| Al-Riyadh SC (Saudi Arabia) | 2 – 2 | (Egypt) Al Ahly |

Stade El Menzah, Tunis
30 September 1995

| Club Africain (Tunisia) | 2 – 1 | (United Arab Emirates) Al-Nasr Dubai |

Stade El Menzah, Tunis

1 October 1995

| Al Ahly (Egypt) | 3 – 1 | (United Arab Emirates) Al-Nasr Dubai |

Stade El Menzah, Tunis
1 October 1995

| Club Africain (Tunisia) | 1 – 0 | (Syria) Al-Ittihad Aleppo |

Stade El Menzah, Tunis

3 October 1995

| Club Africain (Tunisia) | 1 – 0 | (Saudi Arabia) Al-Riyadh SC |

Stade El Menzah, Tunis
3 October 1995

| Al-Ittihad Aleppo (Syria) | 3 – 0 | (United Arab Emirates) Al-Nasr Dubai |

Stade El Menzah, Tunis

5 October 1995

| Al Ahly (Egypt) | 1 – 0 | (Syria) Al-Ittihad Aleppo |

Stade El Menzah, Tunis
5 October 1995

| Al-Riyadh SC (Saudi Arabia) | 2 – 0 | (United Arab Emirates) Al-Nasr Dubai |

Stade El Menzah, Tunis

7 October 1995

| Club Africain (Tunisia) | 4 – 1 | (Egypt) Al Ahly |

Stade El Menzah, Tunis
Referee: Said Belqola (Morocco)
7 October 1995

| Al-Riyadh SC (Saudi Arabia) | 2 – 0 | (Syria) Al-Ittihad Aleppo |

Stade El Menzah, Tunis

== Knock-out stage ==
Semi-finals
9 October – Sousse
(Tunisia) ES Sahel | 2
(Saudi Arabia) Al-Riyadh SC | 0
9 October – Sousse
(Tunisia) Club Africain | 1
(Egypt) Ghazl El-Mehalla | 0

Final
12 October – Sousse
(Tunisia) ES Sahel | 0
(Tunisia) Club Africain (a.e.t.) | 1

=== Semi-finals ===
9 October 1995

| ES Sahel (Tunisia) | 2 – 0 | (Saudi Arabia) Al-Riyadh SC |

Stade Olympique de Sousse, Sousse

9 October 1995

| Club Africain (Tunisia) | 1 – 0 | (Egypt) Ghazl El-Mehalla |
|---|---|---|
| L. Rouissi 103' |

Stade Olympique de Sousse, Sousse

=== Final ===
12 October 1995

| ES Sahel (Tunisia) | 0 – 1 (a.e.t.) | (Tunisia) Club Africain |
|---|---|---|
| | | Maâloul 97' (pen.) |

Stade Olympique de Sousse, Sousse
Referee: Said Belqola (Morocco)

== Winners ==
1995 Arab Cup Winners' Cup
(Tunisia)
Club Africain
First title
