= El Harti Stadium =

Football stadium in Morocco

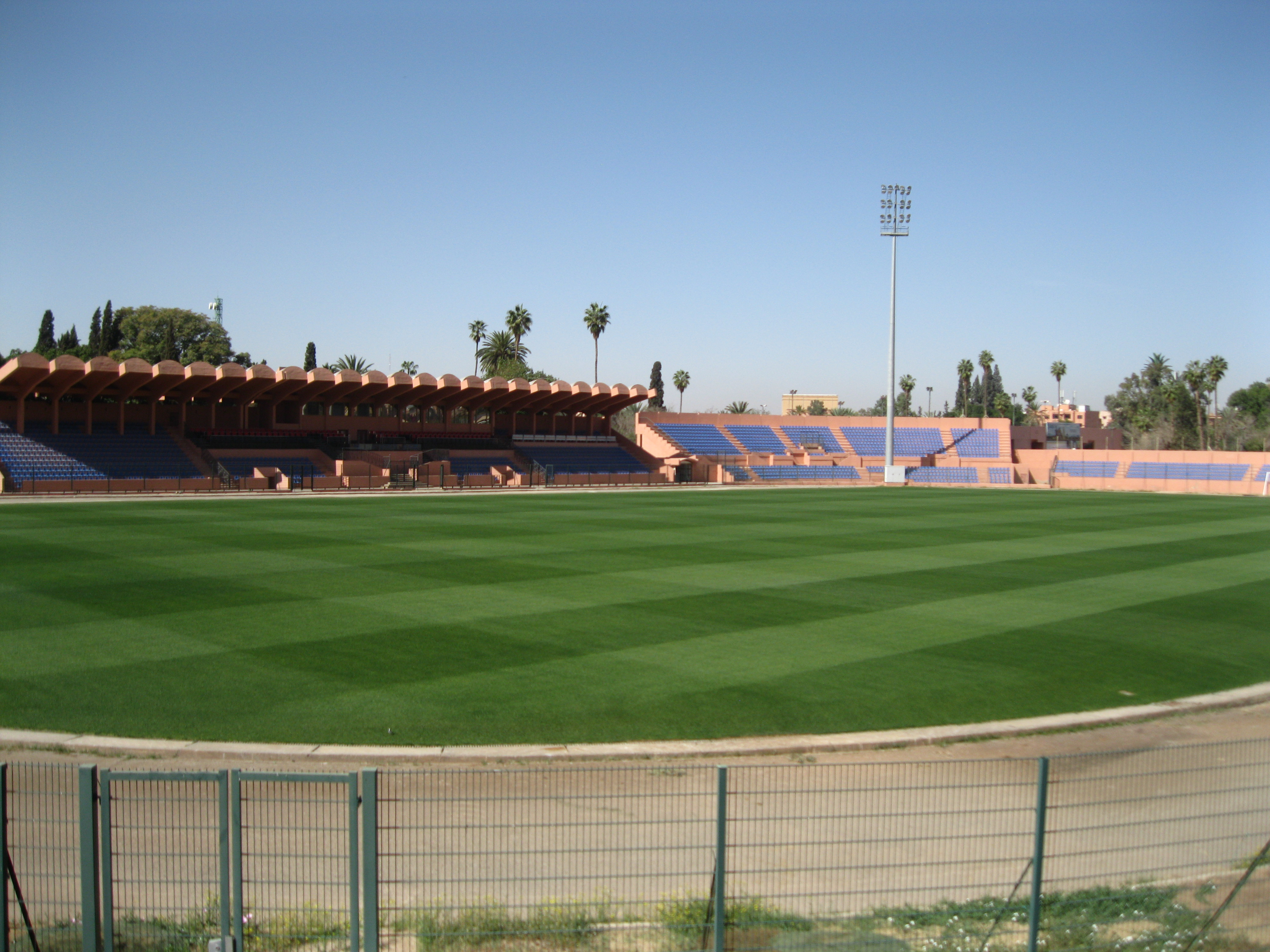
- Interactive map of El Harti Stadium
- Location: Marrakesh, Morocco
- Capacity: 10,000

Tenant
- KAC Marrakech (–2011; 2025; 2026–present)

El Harti Stadium (Arabic: ملعب الحارثي) is a multi-use stadium in Marrakesh, Morocco. It is used mostly for football matches and athletics and hosted the home games of KAC Marrakech. The stadium holds 10,000 people. It was replaced by Stade de Marrakech in 2012, and return in 2025.
