= 1993–94 Moroccan Division Nationale I =

Moroccan football league season

Division Nationale I
- Season: 1993–94
- Champions: Olympique de Casablanca (1st title)

The 1993–94 Division Nationale I is the 38th season of the Moroccan Premier League. Olympique de Casablanca are the holders of the title.
