= 1991 Arab Cup Winners' Cup =

الكأس العربية للأندية الفائزة بالكؤوس 1991

Tournament details
- Host country: UA Emirates
- City: Dubai
- Dates: 3 – 16 Dec 1991
- Teams: 10 (from 1 association)

Final positions
- Champions: (Morocco) CO Casablanca (1st title)
- Runners-up: (Egypt) El-Mokawloon El-Arab
- Third place: (Saudi Arabia) Al-Nassr
- Fourth place: (Bahrain) Al-Muharraq SC

Tournament statistics
- Matches played: 23
- Goals scored: 37 (1.61 per match)
- Top scorer: (Bahrain) Faisal Abdelaziz (3 goals)
- Best player: (Morocco) Aziz Ouzougate
- Best goalkeeper: (Bahrain) Hamood Sultan

The 1991 Arab Cup Winners' Cup was the second edition of the Arab Cup Winners' Cup held in Dubai, United Arab Emirates between 3 – 16 Dec 1991. The teams represented Arab nations from Africa and Asia. CO Casablanca of Morocco won the final against El-Mokawloon El-Arab of Egypt.

== Group stage ==
=== Group 1 ===
Team	Pld	W	D	L	GF	GA	GD	Pts
(Saudi Arabia) Al-Nassr	4	2	2	0	4	1	+3	6
(Egypt) El-Mokawloon El-Arab	4	2	1	1	5	3	+2	5
(United Arab Emirates) Al-Nasr Dubai	4	1	3	0	2	1	+1	5
(Lebanon) Al-Ansar	4	1	0	3	1	3	−2	2
(Kuwait) Kazma SC	4	0	2	2	1	5	−4	2

3 December 1991

Al-Nasr Dubai (United Arab Emirates)	1 – 0	(Lebanon) Al-Ansar

Al-Maktoum Stadium, Dubai
3 December 1991

Kazma SC (Kuwait)	1 – 4	(Egypt) El-Mokawloon El-Arab

Al-Maktoum Stadium, Dubai

5 December 1991

Al-Nasr Dubai (United Arab Emirates)	0 – 0	(Egypt) El-Mokawloon El-Arab

Al-Maktoum Stadium, Dubai
5 December 1991

Kazma SC (Kuwait)	0 – 0	(Saudi Arabia) Al-Nassr

Al-Maktoum Stadium, Dubai

7 December 1991

El-Mokawloon El-Arab (Egypt)	0 – 1	(Saudi Arabia) Al-Nassr

Al-Maktoum Stadium, Dubai
7 December 1991

Al-Ansar (Lebanon)	0 – 0	(Kuwait) Kazma SC

Al-Maktoum Stadium, Dubai

9 December 1991

El-Mokawloon El-Arab (Egypt)	1 – 0	(Lebanon) Al-Ansar

Al-Maktoum Stadium, Dubai
9 December 1991

Al-Nasr Dubai (United Arab Emirates)	1 – 1	(Saudi Arabia) Al-Nassr

Al-Maktoum Stadium, Dubai

11 December 1991

Al-Nassr (Saudi Arabia)	1 – 0	(Lebanon) Al-Ansar

Al-Maktoum Stadium, Dubai
11 December 1991

Al-Nasr Dubai (United Arab Emirates)	0 – 0	(Kuwait) Kazma SC

Al-Maktoum Stadium, Dubai

=== Group 2 ===
Team	Pld	W	D	L	GF	GA	GD	Pts
(Bahrain) Al-Muharraq SC	4	2	2	0	6	4	+2	6
(Morocco) CO Casablanca	4	2	1	1	6	4	+2	5
(Tunisia) Stade Tunisien	4	1	2	1	5	5	0	4
(Qatar) Al-Arabi	4	1	2	1	4	4	0	4
(Sudan) Al-Ittihad SC	4	0	1	3	2	6	−4	1

4 December 1991

Stade Tunisien (Tunisia)	1 – 2	(Morocco) CO Casablanca
Fjira 73'		Bourouaine 44'; El Saki 89'

Al-Maktoum Stadium, Dubai
4 December 1991

Al-Muharraq SC (Bahrain)	0 – 0	(Sudan) Al-Ittihad SC

Al-Maktoum Stadium, Dubai

6 December 1991

Al-Muharraq SC (Bahrain)	2 – 1	(Qatar) Al-Arabi

Al-Maktoum Stadium, Dubai
6 December 1991

Stade Tunisien (Tunisia)	2 – 1	(Sudan) Al-Ittihad SC

Al-Maktoum Stadium, Dubai

8 December 1991

CO Casablanca (Morocco)	1 – 2	(Bahrain) Al-Muharraq SC

Al-Maktoum Stadium, Dubai
8 December 1991

Al-Ittihad SC (Sudan)	1 – 2	(Qatar) Al-Arabi

Al-Maktoum Stadium, Dubai

10 December 1991

Stade Tunisien (Tunisia)	0 – 0	(Qatar) Al-Arabi

Al-Maktoum Stadium, Dubai
10 December 1991

CO Casablanca (Morocco)	2 – 0	(Sudan) Al-Ittihad Wad Madani

Al-Maktoum Stadium, Dubai

12 December 1991

Al-Arabi (Qatar)	1 – 1	(Morocco) CO Casablanca

Al-Maktoum Stadium, Dubai
12 December 1991

Stade Tunisien (Tunisia)	2 – 2	(Bahrain) Al-Muharraq SC

Al-Maktoum Stadium, Dubai

== Knock-out stage ==
Semi-finals
14 December – Dubai
(Bahrain) Al-Muharraq SC	0 (3)
(Egypt) El-Mokawloon (p)	0 (5)
14 December – Dubai
(Saudi Arabia) Al-Nassr	0 (3)
(Morocco) CO Casablanca (p)	0 (4)

Final
16 December – Dubai
(Egypt) El-Mokawloon	0
(Morocco) CO Casablanca	1

=== Semi-finals ===
14 December 1991

Al-Muharraq SC (Bahrain)	0 – 0 (a.e.t.)	(Egypt) El-Mokawloon El-Arab
Penalties
	3 – 5

Al-Maktoum Stadium, Dubai

14 December 1991

Al-Nassr (Saudi Arabia)	0 – 0 (a.e.t.)	(Morocco) CO Casablanca
Penalties
	3 – 4

Al-Maktoum Stadium, Dubai

=== Final ===
16 December 1991

El-Mokawloon El-Arab (Egypt)	0 – 1 (a.e.t.)	(Morocco) CO Casablanca
		Bekkari 115'

Al-Maktoum Stadium, Dubai

== Winners ==
1991 Arab Cup Winners' Cup
(Morocco)
CO Casablanca
First title
