= Haifa SC =

Iraqi football club

- Full name: Haifa Sport Club
- Founded: 1973; 52 years ago
- Ground: Haifa Stadium
- Chairman: Saad Tawfiq
- Manager: Saad Shihab
- League: Iraqi Third Division League
Home colours	Away colours

Haifa Sport Club (Arabic: نادي حيفا الرياضي), is an Iraqi football team based in Al-Baladiyat, Baghdad, that plays in the Iraqi Third Division League.

== History ==
=== Founding and Naming ===
Haifa Club was established on March 21, 1973 in Baghdad for the Palestinian community in Iraq. The name of the club was taken from the name of the city of Haifa.

=== In Premier League ===
Haifa team played in the Iraqi Premier League for the first time in the 1999–2000 season, and the team was not good enough, and finished the season at the bottom of the standings.

== Managerial history ==
- (Iraq) Saad Shihab

== See also ==
- 2020–21 Iraq FA Cup
