= CO Casablanca =

Moroccan football club

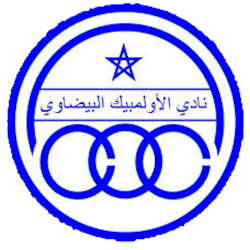
- Full name: Club Olympique de Casablanca
- Founded: 1904; 122 years ago
- Dissolved: 6 July 1995; 31 years ago
- Ground: Stade du COC
- Capacity: 5,000
- 1994–95: Botola Pro, 2nd of 16 (dissolved)
Home colours

Club Olympique de Casablanca (Arabic: نادي الأولمبيك البيضاوي) or CO Casablanca for a short, is a defunct Moroccan football club that was based in Casablanca. The club played its home games at the Stade du COC

== History ==
Olympique de Casablanca is considered to be one of the oldest Moroccan and African clubs. In the early years of the 20th century (1904), a group of French residents of the city of Casablanca who worked in the Milk Company decided to establish a multi-sports entertainment club called the Milk Association. After the independence, the club remained under the tutelage of the Milk Company and became involved in the local football department.

Little is known about the team's performances during the French protectorate in Morocco. After the independence, the team spent the next three decades playing in the lower divisions. In 1979, they contested a play-off for promotion to the second tier against Crush, which ended in a defeat. However, luck was on the club's side following the withdrawal of Crush soft drinks company and its shares were bought. Throughout this period (up until 1991), the club was known as CLAS Casablanca which stands for Centrale Laitière Association Sportive and was incorporated into ONA, the largest holding in the country.

The club created a major upset by winning the Throne Cup in 1983, when they beat the defending champions Raja CA 5–4 on penalties after the game had ended 1–1 in regular and extra time in the final at the Stade Mohammed V, becoming the first team to win it while playing in the second division. It was also the club's first title since its foundation in 1904.

As cup winners, CLAS Casablanca qualified to play in the African Cup Winners' Cup in 1984 but were eliminated in the First Round following a 1–5 loss on aggregate against the eventual champions Al Ahly. It would also be their last ever appearance at African level.

The club hit another milestone in the 1980s when they achieved promotion to the top flight in 1987 ahead of the 1987-88 season for the first time in the club's history. They finished 6th in the league standings in their maiden season and were invited to play at the 1989 Arab Club Champions Cup, going out at the preliminary round after finishing bottom of their group behind Étoile du Sahel and JS Kabylie, thereby missing the final tournament in Marrakesh.

The club were also invited to participate in the now-defunct Mohammed V Trophy, a four-team friendly tournament. In 1988, the club finished last, losing to HUS Agadir (1-1 a.e.t, 2–4 on penalties) in the semi-finals and KAC Marrakech (1–3) in the third place playoff. The team improved their performance in the following year (which was also the last edition), reaching the final before losing to FC Sochaux (0-0, 3–4 on penalties).

In 1990, the club won the Throne Cup for the second time, beating FAR Rabat 4–2 on penalties (0-0 a.e.t). Consequently, the club opted to enter the 1991 Arab Cup Winners' Cup. They managed to win the competition at first attempt, defeating Egyptian side El-Mokawloon El-Arab 1–0 in the final. In the same year, the club changed their name to become Club Olympique de Casablanca (COC). They then went on to defend their title twice consecutively in 1992 and 1993, in the process becoming the only club to have won the competition three times in a row (and overall). That streak ended in 1994, when they were beaten by Al Ahly 2–3 in the semi-finals.

At domestic level, the club won their third Throne Cup title in 1992 at the expense of Raja CA in a rematch of the 1983 final. This time with a 1–0 scoreline. In the 1993-94 season, Olympique de Casablanca won their first ever (and also their last) league title, 90 years into the club's existence, finishing 10 points ahead of runners-up Wydad Casablanca. They also came close to retaining the title in the following season, but finished runners-up one point behind COD Meknès. The club ceased to exist at the end of that season, when it was dissolved due to ONA's decision to pull out of the club for financial constraints.

== Honours ==
=== National titles ===
- Botola Pro
  - Champion: 1993–94
  - Runners-up : 1994–95
- Throne Cup
  - Winners (3): 1983, 1990, 1992
- Botola Pro 2
  - Champion: 1986-87

=== International titles ===
- Arab Cup Winners' Cup
  - Winners (3): 1991, 1992, 1993

== Performance in CAF competitions ==
- African Cup of Champions Clubs/ CAF Champions League:

1995 – Did not enter

- CAF Cup Winners' Cup: 1 appearance

1984 – First Round
1991 – Did not enter
1993 – Did not enter

Season	Competition	Round	Opposition	Home	Away	Aggregate
1984	African Cup Winners' Cup	First round	(Egypt) Al Ahly SC	0–2	1–3	1–5

== Performance in UAFA competitions ==
- Arab Club Champions Cup:

1989 – Preliminary Round

- Arab Cup Winners' Cup:

1991 – Champion
1992 – Champion
1993 – Champion
1994 – Semi-Final

- Arab Elite Cup:

1992 – Third place
