= Arab Cup Winners' Cup =

- Founded: 1989
- Abolished: 2001
- Region: Arab world (UAFA)
- Teams: 10
- Last champions: (Tunisia) Stade Tunisien (2nd title)
- Most championships: (Morocco) CO Casablanca (3 titles)

The Arab Cup Winners' Cup (Arabic: الكأس العربية للأندية الفائزة بالكؤوس) was a football competition between the winning clubs of national cup competitions in Arab nations. It started in 1989 and merged with the Arab Club Champions Cup and Arab Super Cup in 2002 to form the Arab Unified Club Championship.

== History ==
After the Arab Club Champions Cup, the UAFA held another championship for domestic cup champions, which began in its first edition in 1989. The inaugural competition was hosted by the Saudi Al-Ittihad Club in Jeddah, and the Stade Tunisien won the title. The competition continued until 2002, when it had its last edition in Tunis which was also won by Stade Tunisien.

== Records and statistics ==
=== Winners by club ===
#	Club	Winners	Runners-up
1	(Morocco) CO Casablanca	3	0
2	(Tunisia) Stade Tunisien	2	0
2	(Algeria) MC Oran	2	0
4	(Egypt) Al Ahly	1	0
4	(Saudi Arabia) Al-Hilal FC	1	0
4	(Qatar) Al-Ittihad SC (now Al-Gharafa SC)	1	0
4	(Tunisia) Club Africain	1	0
4	(Morocco) OC Khouribga	1	0
9	(Syria) Al-Jaish SC	0	2
-	(Saudi Arabia) Al-Shabab Club	0	2
11	(Jordan) Al-Faisaly Club	0	1
11	(Sudan) Al-Hilal Club	0	1
11	(Saudi Arabia) Al Nassr FC	0	1
11	(Saudi Arabia) Al-Qadisiyah FC	0	1
11	(Egypt) El Mokawloon SC	0	1
11	(Tunisia) Étoile du Sahel	0	1
11	Kuwait SC	0	1
11	(Qatar) Sadd SC	0	1

=== Winners by country ===
#	Nation	Winners	Runners-up	Total
1	Morocco	4	0	4
2	Tunisia	3	1	4
3	Algeria	2	0	2
4	Saudi Arabia	1	4	5
5	Egypt	1	1	2
5	Qatar	1	1	2
7	Syria	0	2	2
8	Jordan	0	1	1
8	Kuwait	0	1	1
8	Sudan	0	1	1

== All-time top scorers ==
Rank	Nat	Name	Goals
1	(Liberia)	Frank Seator	11
2	(Algeria)	Rachid Amrane	8
2	(Zambia)	Maybein Mokay	8
4	(Saudi Arabia)	Abdullah Al-Jumaan	7
5	(Morocco)	Toufiq Balagha	6
5	(Tunisia)	Imed Ben Younes	6
5	(Iraq)	Laith Hussein	6
5	(Syria)	Mohamed Mustapha	6
