= 1995 Saudi Crown Prince Cup =

1995 Crown Prince Cup
Tournament details
- Country: Saudi Arabia
- Dates: 19 April – 26 May 1995
- Teams: 16 (main competition)

Final positions
- Champions: Al-Hilal (2nd title)
- Runners-up: Al-Riyadh
- Asian Cup Winners' Cup: Al-Hilal
- Arab Cup Winners' Cup: Al-Riyadh

Tournament statistics
- Matches played: 15
- Goals scored: 42 (2.8 per match)
- Top goal scorer(s): Ohene Kennedy; Khaled Al-Suwailem; Ahmed Bahja (3 goals each)

The 1995 Crown Prince Cup was the 20th season of the Saudi premier knockout tournament since its establishment in 1957. The main competition started on 19 April and concluded with the final on 26 May 1995.

In the final, Al-Hilal defeated defending champions Al-Riyadh 1–0 to secure their second title and first since 1964. The final was held at the Prince Abdullah Al-Faisal Stadium in Jeddah for the third time. As winners of the tournament, Al-Hilal qualified for the 1996–97 Asian Cup Winners' Cup. As runners-up, Al-Riyadh qualified for the 1996 Arab Cup Winners' Cup.

== Qualifying rounds ==
All of the competing teams that are not members of the Premier League competed in the qualifying rounds to secure one of 4 available places in the Round of 16. First Division sides Al-Nahda and Al-Shoulla and Second Division sides Al-Jabalain and Damac qualified.

== Bracket ==
Round of 16
H	Al-Hilal	3
A	Damac	0
H	Al-Shabab	1
A	Al-Nahda	0
H	Al-Ittihad	4
A	Al-Rawdhah	0
A	Al-Najma	0
H	Al-Nassr	3
H	Al-Jabalain	1
A	Al-Wehda	2
A	Al-Riyadh (a.e.t.)	2
H	Al-Raed	1
H	Al-Shoulla	5
A	Al-Qadisiyah	4
A	Al-Ettifaq (pen.)	1 (7)
H	Al-Ahli	1 (6)

Quarter-finals
H	Al-Hilal (a.e.t.)	2
A	Al-Shabab	1
H	Al-Ittihad	3
A	Al-Nassr	1
H	Al-Wehda	0
A	Al-Riyadh	2
A	Al-Shoulla	0
H	Al-Ettifaq (a.e.t.)	1

Semi-finals
A	Al-Hilal	1
H	Al-Ittihad	0
H	Al-Riyadh	2
A	Al-Ettifaq	0

Final
–	Al-Hilal	1
–	Al-Riyadh	0

== Round of 16 ==
The draw for the Round of 16 was held on 15 April 1995. The Round of 16 fixtures were played on 19, 20 & 21 April 1995. All times are local, AST (UTC+3).

19 April 1995	Al-Hilal (1)	3–0	Damac (3)	Riyadh
20:30	Sérgio 27'; Bahja 51'; Al-Haya'e	Report		Stadium: Youth Welfare Stadium in Al-Malaz

20 April 1995	Al-Jabalain (3)	1–2	Al-Wehda (1)	Ha'il
16:00	Al-Salamah	Report	Al-Dosari; Al-Barakati pen.'	Stadium: Prince Abdul Aziz bin Musa'ed Stadium

20 April 1995	Al-Nassr (1)	3–0	Al-Najma (1)	Riyadh
20:30	Kennedy 23', 55', 89'	Report		Stadium: Youth Welfare Stadium in Al-Malaz; Referee: Ibrahim Al-Omar

20 April 1995	Al-Ittihad (1)	4–0	Al-Rawdhah (1)	Jeddah
20:30	Al-Shamrani; Rehan; Al-Khilaiwi pen.' Bassas	Report		Stadium: Youth Welfare Stadium

20 April 1995	Al-Shoulla (2)	5–4	Al-Qadisiyah (1)	Al Kharj
20:30	Al-Khnein 56' (pen.); Al-Farhan 67'; Mike 78'; García 88', 90+1'	Report	Al-Shareedah 23'; Al-Khaldi 34'; Al-Ganbar 62', 90+3'	Stadium: Al-Shoulla Club Stadium; Referee: Hassan Al-Buhairi

21 April 1995	Al-Raed (1)	1–2 (a.e.t.)	Al-Riyadh (1)	Buraidah
20:30	Al-Hussain	Report	Al-Suwailem 34', 111'	Stadium: Prince Abdullah bin Abdul Aziz Stadium

21 April 1995	Al-Ahli (1)	1–1 (a.e.t.) (6–7 p)	Al-Ettifaq (1)	Jeddah
20:30	Masaad 45' (pen.)	Report	Khaleel 33'	Stadium: Youth Welfare Stadium; Referee: Nasser Al-Hamdan
	Penalties
	Okbi (penalty missed); Saleh (penalty missed); Zubromawi (penalty scored); Masaad (penalty scored); Aloui (penalty scored); Sheliah (penalty scored); Gahwji (penalty missed); Al-Shehri (penalty missed); Abo Sifeen (penalty scored); Al-Qarni (penalty scored); Al-Haddad (penalty missed); Okbi (penalty missed)		(penalty scored) Victor; (penalty scored) Al-Dossari; (penalty scored) Khaleel; (penalty missed) Al-Beloushi; (penalty missed) Al-Maghlouth; (penalty scored) Al-Dubaikhi; (penalty missed) Al-Makhdum; (penalty missed) Saleh; (penalty scored) Al-Fuhaid; (penalty scored) Hilal; (penalty missed) Al-Antaif; (penalty scored) Victor

21 April 1995	Al-Shabab (1)	1–0	Al-Nahda (2)	Riyadh
20:30	Al-Owairan 15'	Report		Stadium: Youth Welfare Stadium in Al-Malaz

== Quarter-finals ==
The draw for the Quarter-finals was held on 22 April 1995. The Quarter-finals fixtures were played on 27 & 28 April 1995. All times are local, AST (UTC+3).

27 April 1995	Al-Hilal (1)	2–1 (a.e.t.)	Al-Shabab (1)	Riyadh
20:45	Bahja 50'; Al-Rashaid 110'	Report	Ayando 86'	Stadium: Youth Welfare Stadium in Al-Malaz; Referee: Hassan Al-Buhairi

27 April 1995	Al-Wehda (1)	0–2	Al-Riyadh (1)	Mecca
20:45		Report	Al-Suwailem 13'; Al-Dossari 40'	Stadium: King Abdul Aziz Stadium

28 April 1995	Al-Ittihad (1)	3–1	Al-Nassr (1)	Jeddah
20:45	Swayed 2'; Tatarchuk 76'; Sergeyev 79'	Report	Abdullah 89' (pen.)	Stadium: Youth Welfare Stadium; Referee: Abdulaziz Al-Dakheel

28 April 1995	Al-Ettifaq (1)	1–0 (a.e.t.)	Al-Shoulla (2)	Khobar
20:45	Saleh 98'	Report		Stadium: Prince Saud bin Jalawi Stadium; Referee: Abdulaziz Al-Eidan

== Semi-finals ==
The draw for the Semi-finals was held on 29 April 1995. The Semi-finals fixtures were played on 18 & 19 May 1995. All times are local, AST (UTC+3).

18 May 1995	Al-Ittihad (1)	0–1	Al-Hilal (1)	Jeddah
20:45		Report	Bahja 52'	Stadium: Youth Welfare Stadium; Referee: Omer Al Mehannah

19 May 1995	Al-Riyadh (1)	2–0	Al-Ettifaq (1)	Riyadh
20:45	Al-Hamdan 61', 73'	Report		Stadium: Youth Welfare Stadium in Al-Malaz; Referee: Abdul Rahman Al-Zaid

== Final ==
The 1995 Crown Prince Cup Final was played on 26 May 1995 at the Youth Welfare Stadium in Jeddah between Al-Hilal and Al-Riyadh. This was the third Crown Prince Cup final to be held at the stadium. This was Al-Hilal's second final and Al-Riyadh's second final as well. All times are local, AST (UTC+3).

26 May 1995
20:30

Al-Hilal	1–0	Al-Riyadh
Al-Jaber 47'	Report

Youth Welfare Stadium, Jeddah
Referee: Abdulaziz Al-Dakheel

== Top goalscorers ==
Rank	Player	Club	Goals
1	(Ghana) Ohene Kennedy	Al-Nassr	3
1	(Saudi Arabia) Khaled Al-Suwailem	Al-Riyadh	3
1	(Morocco) Ahmed Bahja	Al-Hilal	3
4	(Bolivia) Arturo García	Al-Shoulla	2
4	(Saudi Arabia) Saleh Al-Ganbar	Al-Qadisiyah	2
4	(Saudi Arabia) Fahd Al-Hamdan	Al-Riyadh	2
