= List of Al-Nassr FC presidents and chief executive officers =

This is a chronological list of presidents and chief executive officers (CEOs) of Al-Nassr FC, a professional association football club based in Riyadh, Saudi Arabia. Founded in 1955, the club initially operated under a traditional governance model where the president held full administrative and financial authority over all club operations. Following the club's privatization and structural reorganization in 2023, a two-tier administrative framework was established. Under this current model, the president is elected by the club's general assembly to lead the non-profit foundation and the board of directors, while an appointed chief executive officer oversees the daily corporate management and commercial operations of the club company.

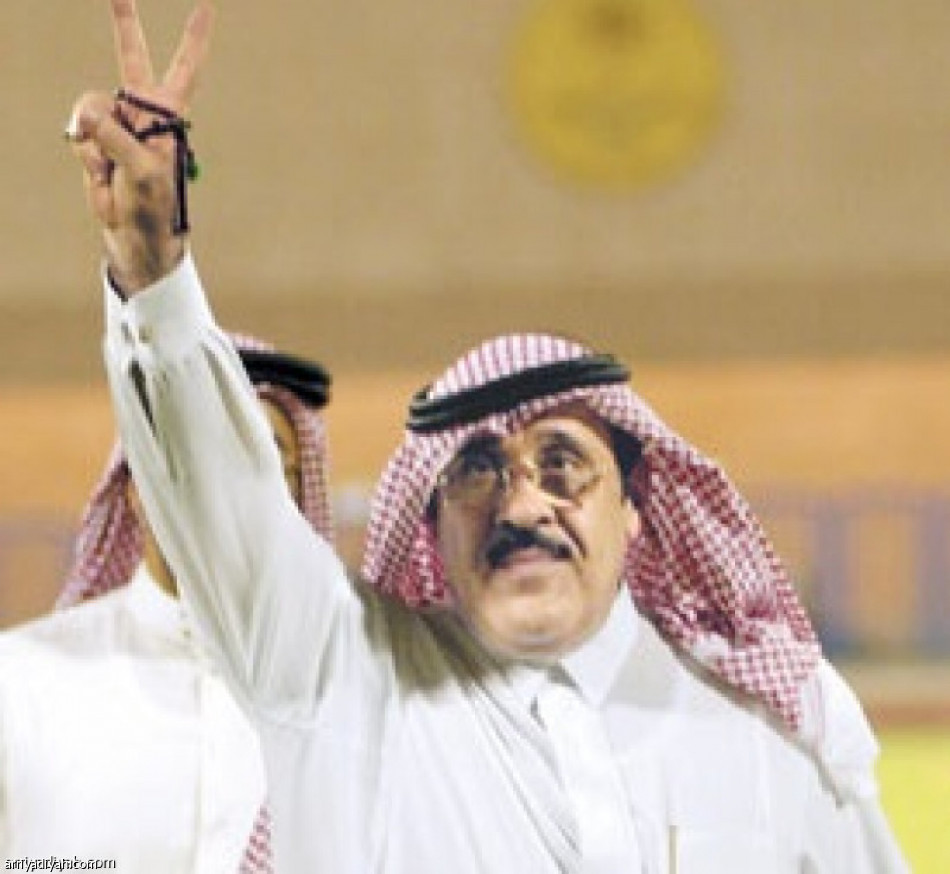
Abdulrahman bin Saud served as president for over 36 years across three separate tenures.

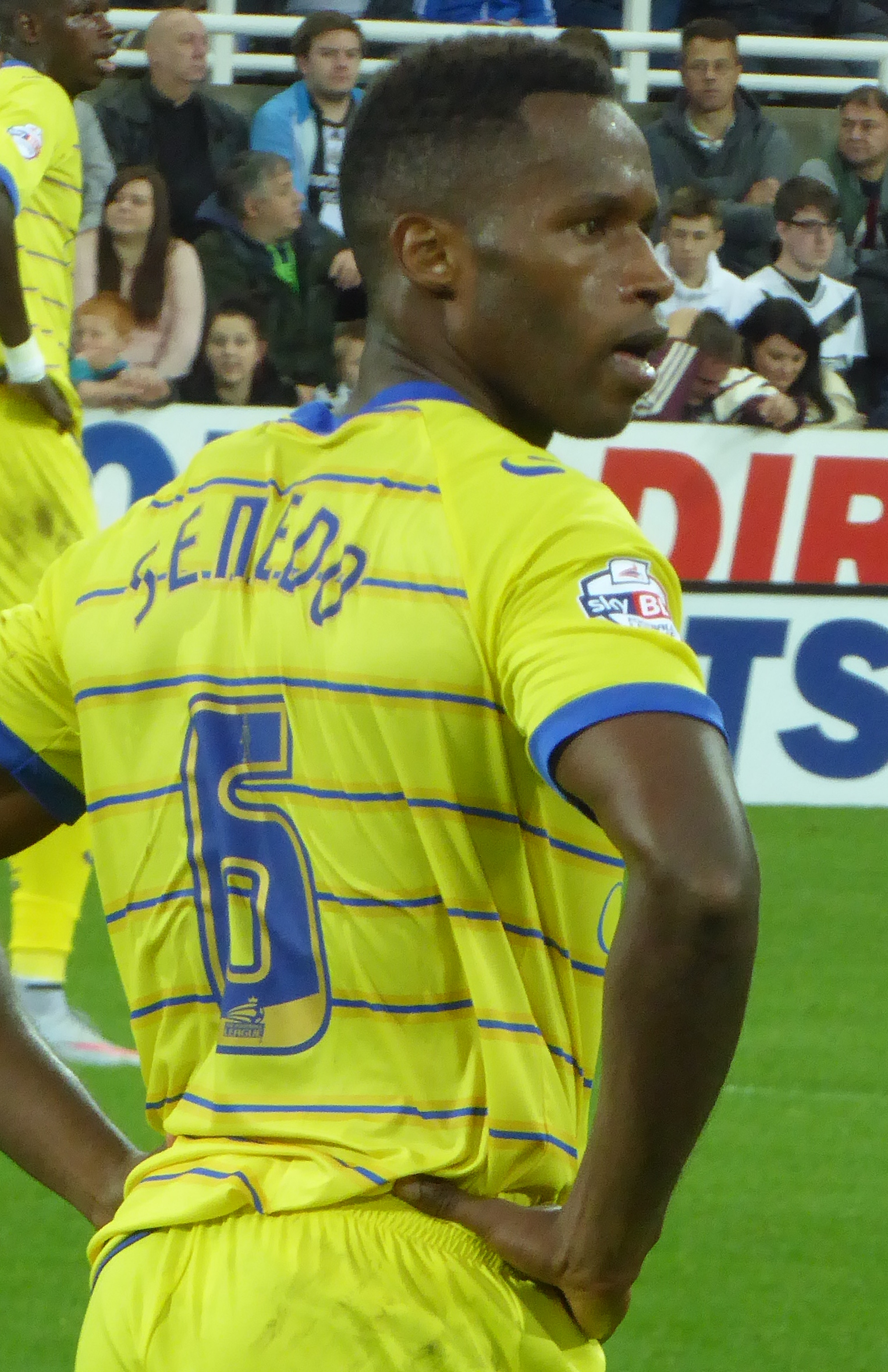
Portuguese former footballer José Semedo is the current acting CEO of the club.

== Presidents ==
No.	President	Term began	Term ended
1	(Saudi Arabia) Zaid Al-Jaaba	24 October 1955	1956
2	(Sudan) Ahmed Al-Barbari	1956	1960
3	(Saudi Arabia) Mohammed Saad Al-Wehaibi	1960	1960
4	(Saudi Arabia) Mohammed Ahmed Al-Odaini	1960	1960
5	(Saudi Arabia) Abdulrahman bin Saud (1st term)	1960	1969
6	(Saudi Arabia) Sultan bin Saud	1969	1975
7	(Saudi Arabia) Abdulrahman bin Saud (2nd term)	1975	1997
8	(Saudi Arabia) Faisal bin Abdulrahman (1st term)	1997	2000
9	(Saudi Arabia) Abdulrahman bin Saud (3rd term)	2000	2004
10	(Saudi Arabia) Mamdouh bin Abdulrahman	2005	2006
11	(Saudi Arabia) Faisal bin Abdulrahman (2nd term)	2006	2009
12	(Saudi Arabia) Faisal bin Turki	15 March 2009	1 January 2018
–	(Saudi Arabia) Salman Al-Malik (Acting)	1 January 2018	14 March 2018
–	(Saudi Arabia) Saud Al-Suwailem (Acting)	14 March 2018	13 July 2019
13	(Saudi Arabia) Safwan Al-Suwaiket	13 July 2019	21 March 2021
14	(Saudi Arabia) Musalli Al-Muammar	1 April 2021	19 March 2024
15	(Saudi Arabia) Ibrahim Al-Muhaidib	21 June 2024	3 September 2024
16	(Saudi Arabia) Abdullah Al-Majed	28 October 2024	Incumbent

== Chief Executive Officers ==
No.	Chief Executive Officer	Term began	Term ended
1	(Saudi Arabia) Ahmed Al-Ghamdi	4 April 2021	27 September 2023
2	(Italy) Guido Fienga	27 September 2023	1 January 2025
3	(Saudi Arabia) Majid Al-Jam'an	1 January 2025	17 July 2025
—	(Portugal) José Semedo (Acting)	18 July 2025	Incumbent

== See also ==
- Al-Nassr FC
- Al-Nassr FC (women)
- List of Al-Nassr FC managers
