= 1995 Arab Club Champions Cup =

بطولة الأندية العربية لأبطال الدوري 1995

Tournament details
- Host country: Saudi Arabia
- City: Riyadh
- Dates: 30 November - 13 December
- Teams: 10 (from 2 confederations) (from 9 associations)
- Venue: (in 1 host city)

Final positions
- Champions: (Saudi Arabia) Al-Hilal (2nd title)
- Runners-up: (Tunisia) Espérance de Tunis

Tournament statistics
- Matches played: 23
- Goals scored: 69 (3 per match)
- Top scorer: (Ghana) Ohene Kennedy (4 goals)
- Best goalkeeper: (Saudi Arabia) Modhe Al-Dosari

Arab Club Champions Cup Text logo

The 1995 Arab Club Champions Cup was played in Saudi Arabia in the city of Riyadh. Al-Hilal won the championship for the second time beating in the final Espérance de Tunis.

== Participants ==
Participants
Zone	Team	Qualifying method
	(Saudi Arabia) Al-Nassr	Hosts
Zone 1	(Bahrain) East Riffa	1993–94 Bahraini Premier League winners
Zone 1	(Kuwait) Kazma	1992–93 Kuwaiti League winners
Zone 2	(Saudi Arabia) Al-Hilal (Riyadh)	Holders & 1993–94 Saudi Premier League 3rd
Zone 2	(Sudan) Al-Hilal (Omdurman)	1994–95 Sudan Premier League winners
Zone 2	(Yemen) Al-Wehda	1993–94 Yemeni League 4th
Zone 3	(Algeria) CR Belouizdad	1993–94 Algerian Championnat National 4th
Zone 3	(Tunisia) Espérance de Tunis	1993–94 Tunisian League winners
Zone 4	(Jordan) Al-Wehdat	1993–94 Jordan League winners
Zone 4	(Palestine) Jabal Al-Mukaber	West Bank Premier League representative

== Final tournament ==
Final tournament held in Riyadh, Saudi Arabia in December 1995.

=== Group stage ===
==== Group A ====
Team	Pld	W	D	L	GF	GA	GD	Pts
(Algeria) CR Belouizdad	4	4	0	0	8	0	+8	12
(Saudi Arabia) Al-Nassr	4	2	1	1	11	3	+8	7
(Kuwait) Kazma	4	2	1	1	8	5	+3	7
(Jordan) Al-Wehdat	4	0	1	3	4	11	−7	1
(Yemen) Al-Wehda	4	0	1	3	2	14	−12	1

CR Belouizdad (Algeria)	1 – 0	(Saudi Arabia) Al-Nassr
Ali Moussa (–)

Riyadh

Al-Wehdat (Jordan)	2 – 3	(Kuwait) Kazma
Mahmoud (–)

Riyadh

CR Belouizdad (Algeria)	1 – 0	(Jordan) Al-Wehdat

Riyadh

Al-Nassr (Saudi Arabia)	4 – 0	(Yemen) Al-Wehda
Kennedy (–); Ibn-Nusaib (–)

Riyadh

CR Belouizdad (Algeria)	1 – 0	(Kuwait) Kazma

Riyadh

Al-Wehdat (Jordan)	1 – 1	(Yemen) Al-Wehda
Abdul-Moneim (–)

Riyadh

CR Belouizdad (Algeria)	5 – 0	(Yemen) Al-Wehda

Riyadh

Al-Nassr (Saudi Arabia)	1 – 1	(Kuwait) Kazma
Kennedy (–)		– (–)

Riyadh

Al-Nassr (Saudi Arabia)	6 – 1	(Jordan) Al-Wehdat
Al-Esa (–); Al-Jam'an (–); Al-Shui'i (–); Idris (–)		Abdul-Moneim (–)

Riyadh

Kazma (Kuwait)	4 – 1	(Yemen) Al-Wehda

Riyadh

==== Group B ====
Team	Pld	W	D	L	GF	GA	GD	Pts
(Saudi Arabia) Al-Hilal (Riyadh)	4	3	1	0	8	1	+7	10
(Tunisia) Espérance de Tunis	4	2	1	1	9	2	+7	7
(Sudan) Al-Hilal (Omdurman)	4	2	0	2	7	3	+4	6
(Bahrain) East Riffa	4	2	0	2	4	5	−1	6
(Palestine) Jabal Al-Mukaber	4	0	0	4	0	17	−17	0

Espérance de Tunis (Tunisia)	1 – 0	(Sudan) Al-Hilal (Omdurman)

Riyadh

Al-Hilal (Riyadh) (Saudi Arabia)	3 – 1	(Bahrain) East Riffa

Riyadh

Espérance de Tunis (Tunisia)	1 – 1	(Saudi Arabia) Al-Hilal (Riyadh)

Riyadh

Al-Hilal (Omdurman) (Sudan)	4 – 0	(Palestine) Jabal Al-Mukaber
Walieldin

Riyadh

Espérance de Tunis (Tunisia)	0 – 1	(Bahrain) East Riffa

Riyadh

Al-Hilal (Riyadh) (Saudi Arabia)	4 – 0	(Palestine) Jabal Al-Mukaber

Riyadh

Espérance de Tunis (Tunisia)	7 – 0	(Palestine) Jabal Al-Mukaber

Riyadh

Al-Hilal (Omdurman) (Sudan)	3 – 1	(Bahrain) East Riffa
Walieldin; Anas

Riyadh

Al-Hilal (Omdurman) (Sudan)	0 – 1	(Saudi Arabia) Al-Hilal (Riyadh)

Riyadh

East Riffa (Bahrain)	2 – 0	(Palestine) Jabal Al-Mukaber

Riyadh

=== Knockout stage ===
Semi-finals
– Riyadh
(Algeria) CR Belouizdad	0
(Tunisia) Espérance (aet)	1
– Riyadh
(Saudi Arabia) Al-Hilal (p)	0 (4)
(Saudi Arabia) Al-Nassr	0 (2)

Final
– Riyadh
(Tunisia) Espérance	0
(Saudi Arabia) Al-Hilal	1

==== Semi-finals ====
CR Belouizdad (Algeria)	0 – 1 (a.e.t.)	(Tunisia) Espérance de Tunis
		Berkhissa 95'

King Fahd International Stadium, Riyadh
Attendance: 70 000
Referee: Omer Al Mehannah (Saudi Arabia)

Al-Hilal (Saudi Arabia)	0 – 0	(Saudi Arabia) Al-Nassr
Penalties
	4–2

King Fahd International Stadium, Riyadh
Attendance: 70 000
Referee: Ali Mandani (Kuwait)

==== Final ====
Espérance de Tunis (Tunisia)	0 – 1	(Saudi Arabia) Al-Hilal
		Al-Thunayan 17'

King Fahd International Stadium, Riyadh
Attendance: 70 000
Referee: Gamal Al-Ghandour (Egypt)

== Winners ==
1995 Arab Club Champions Cup winners
(Saudi Arabia)
Al-Hilal
Second title
