= 1996–97 Saudi Premier League =

Football league season

Saudi Premier League
- Season: 1996–97
- Champions: Al-Ittihad (2nd title)
- Relegated: Al-Ansar; Al-Qadsiah
- Asian Club Championship: Al-Ittihad
- Top goalscorer: Ahmed Bahja (21 goals)

Statistics of the 1996–97 Saudi Premier League.

Al-Ittihad won the championship, their second title after 1982.

== Clubs ==
=== Stadia and locations ===
Locations of teams in the 1996-97 Saudi Premier League

Club	Location	Stadium	Head coach
Al-Ahli	Jeddah	Prince Abdullah Al-Faisal Stadium	(Brazil) Vantuir
Al-Ansar	Medina	Prince Mohammed bin Abdul Aziz Stadium	
Al-Ettifaq	Dammam	Prince Mohamed bin Fahd Stadium	(Brazil) João Francisco
Al-Hilal	Riyadh	King Fahd Stadium	(Brazil) Oscar
Al-Ittihad	Jeddah	Prince Abdullah Al-Faisal Stadium	(Federal Republic of Yugoslavia) Dimitri Davidović
Al-Nassr	Riyadh	King Fahd Stadium	(Romania) Ilie Balaci
Al-Najma	Unaizah	Al-Najma Club Stadium	
Al-Qadsiah	Khobar	Prince Saud bin Jalawi Stadium	
Al-Riyadh	Riyadh	King Fahd Stadium	(Brazil) Zé Mário
Al-Shabab	Riyadh	King Fahd Stadium	(France) Jean Fernandez
Al-Tai	Ḥaʼil	Prince Abdul Aziz bin Musa'ed Stadium	
Al-Wehda	Mecca	King Abdul Aziz Stadium	

=== Foreign players ===
Club	Player 1	Player 2	Player 3	Player 4	Player 5	Player 6	Former players
Al-Ahli	(Argentina) Marcos Lencina	(Brazil) Luís Antônio	(Kuwait) Ali Marwi				
Al-Ansar							
Al-Ettifaq	(Morocco) Mohamed Fidadi	(Zambia) Kenneth Malitoli					(Senegal) Victor Diagne
Al-Hilal	(Colombia) John Jairo Tréllez	(Morocco) Salaheddine Bassir	(Nigeria) Ricky Owubokiri	(Nigeria) Samson Siasia	(Peru) Carlos Flores	(Zambia) Elijah Litana	(Romania) Ilie Lazăr
Al-Ittihad	(Brazil) Toninho	(Morocco) Abdeljalil Hadda	(Morocco) Ahmed Bahja	(Peru) Alfonso Yáñez			
Al-Najma							
Al-Nassr	(Albania) Hysen Zmijani	(Ghana) Ohene Kennedy	(Ivory Coast) Sam Abouo	(Senegal) Pape Malick Diop	(Senegal) Victor Diagne		(Ivory Coast) Youssouf Fofana
Al-Qadsiah	(Senegal) Diene Faye						
Al-Riyadh	(Iraq) Amer Abdul-Wahab Abdul-Hussein	(Morocco) Abdeljalil El Hajji	(Morocco) Hussein Ammouta	(Syria) Mohannad Al Boushi			
Al-Shabab	(Brazil) Luciano Roger	(Ghana) Ablade Kumah	(Senegal) Mansour Ayanda				
Al-Tai	(Nigeria) Yaya Jaco	(Senegal) Mamadou Sow					
Al-Wehda	(Egypt) Adel Abdel Rahman	(Egypt) Effat Nssar	(Morocco) Mohammed Simou	(Morocco) Saïd Rokbi	(Tunisia) Sabri Jaballah		

== Final league table ==
Pos	Team	Pld	W	D	L	GF	GA	GD	Pts
1	Al-Ittihad	22	14	2	6	54	24	+30	44
2	Al-Nassr	22	12	3	7	37	31	+6	39
3	Al-Hilal	22	10	6	6	23	19	+4	36
4	Al-Shabab	22	10	5	7	31	23	+8	35
5	Al-Ahli	22	7	9	6	28	28	0	30
6	Al-Riyadh	22	7	8	7	33	30	+3	29
7	Al-Ettifaq	22	9	2	11	35	36	−1	29
8	Al-Wehda	22	8	4	10	37	49	−12	28
9	Al-Najma	22	6	8	8	28	30	−2	26
10	Al-Tai	22	7	5	10	27	34	−7	26
11	Al-Ansar	22	7	4	11	23	34	−11	25
12	Al-Qadsiah	22	5	4	13	26	44	−18	19

Promoted from First Division: Al-Shoulla and Al-Taawoun.

== Playoffs ==
=== Semifinals ===
22 May 1997	Al-Shabab	2–4	Al-Ittihad	King Fahd Stadium, Riyadh
	Salem Suroor 40'; Fuad Anwar 41'		15' Ahmed Bahja; 25' (pen.) Ahmed Bahja; 36' Ahmed Bahja; 86' (pen.) Ahmed Bahja	Referee: Ibrahim Al-Omar

23 May 1997	Al-Hilal	2–2	Al-Nassr	King Fahd Stadium, Riyadh
	25' Mansour Al-Muwain; 46' Mansour Al-Muwain		Ohene Kennedy 60'; Ohene Kennedy 67'	Referee: Omer Al Mehannah

29 May 1997	Al-Ittihad	2–2	Al-Shabab	Prince Abdullah Al-Faisal Stadium, Jeddah
	Khamis Al-Zahrani 42'; Meshal Al-Turki 73'		30' Fahad Al-Mehallel; 63' Abdullah Al-Shihan	Referee: Abdul Rahman Al-Zaid

30 May 1997	Al-Nassr	1–3	Al-Hilal	King Fahd Stadium, Riyadh
	81' Victor Diagne		Abdullah Al-Sharida 30'; Khamis Al-Owairan 44'; Sami Al-Jaber 86'	Referee: Abdulaziz Al-Dakhil

=== Third place match ===
4 June 1996	Al-Nassr	1–0	Al-Shabab	Prince Faisal bin Fahd Stadium, Riyadh
	Khaled Al-Dhaidh 88'			Referee: Abdulaziz Al-Sulaiman

=== Final ===
6 June 1997	Al-Ittihad	2–0	Al-Hilal	Prince Abdullah Al-Faisal Stadium, Jeddah
	13' Jabar Al-Shamrani; 90' Jari Al-Qarni			Referee: Omer Al Mehannah

Saudi Premier League
1996-97 winners

2nd title
