= Sultan bin Saud Al Saud =

Saudi royal (died 1975)

- Died: 1975
- Issue: List: Prince Saud; Prince Khalid; Prince Mansour; Prince Turki; Prince Mohammed; Prince Talal
Names
- Sultan bin Saud bin Abdulaziz
- House: Al Saud
- Father: King Saud
- Mother: Munirah Al Haboot Al Mutairi

Sultan bin Saud Al Saud (Arabic: سلطان بن سعود آل سعود Sulṭan bin Suʿūd Āl Suʿūd; died 1975) was one of the children of King Saud and one of the grandsons of Saudi Arabia's founder King Abdulaziz.

== Biography ==
Prince Sultan was the 6th President of the Al-Nasr Club in Saudi Arabia and held that office for 6 years (1969–1975). One of his brothers, Prince Abdul Rahman bin Saud, was the godfather of Al Nasr. Two of his nephews, Faisal bin Abdul Rahman and Mamdouh bin Abdul Rahman, were also Al Nasr presidents.

Prince Sultan had six sons. One of them, Mansour, died in November 2012 at the age of 42.
