= 1998–99 UE Lleida season =

UE Lleida
1998–99 season
- President: Antoni Gausí
- Manager: Miquel Corominass
- Grounds: Camp d'Esports
- Segunda División: 11th
- Copa del Rey: Third Round
- Copa Catalunya: 2nd Place
- Ciutat de Lleida Trophy: 2nd Place
- Top goalscorer: League: Josemi Pérez; All: Josemi Pérez

This is a complete list of appearances by members of the professional playing squad of UE Lleida during the 1998–99 season.

Lleida finished 11th in the Segunda División league table.

No.		Player	Pos	Lge Apps	Lge Gls	Cup Apps	Cup Gls	Tot Apps	Tot Gls	Date signed	Previous club
Goalkeepers
1	(Spain)	Raúl Ojeda	GK	16	-	5	-	21	-	1996	Gavà
25	(Spain)	Miguel Mora	GK	26 (1)	-	1	-	27 (1)	-	1998	Binéfar
Defenders
2	(Spain)	Fran Figueroa	DF	38	-	3 (1)	-	41 (1)	-	1998	Polideportivo Almería
3	(North Macedonia)	Goran Stanić	DF	27 (2)	1	5	-	32 (2)	1	1998	Vardar
5	(Brazil)	Vlademir Giordani	DF	11 (4)	1	3	-	14 (4)	1	1998	Ypiranga
12	(Serbia)	Goran Milošević	DF	6	-	2	-	8	-	1998	Espanyol
19	(Spain)	Francesc Navarro	DF	31 (1)	1	1	-	32 (1)	1	1997	Logroñés
21	(Spain)	Quique Álvarez	DF	37 (1)	1	4	-	41 (1)	1	1998	Logroñés
22	(Spain)	David Sánchez	DF	0 (1)	-	1	-	1 (1)	-	1998	Espanyol B
-	(Spain)	Oriol Lozano	DF	4	-	-	-	4	-	1998	Academy
Midfielders
4	(Bosnia and Herzegovina)	Radoslav Radulović	MF	21 (2)	2	4	-	25 (2)	2	1998	Zemun
6	(Spain)	Vicente Simeón	MF	10 (3)	-	2 (2)	-	12 (5)	-	1997	Villarreal
8	(Spain)	Antonio Roa	MF	26 (7)	5	3 (1)	-	29 (8)	5	1994	Mérida
10	(Spain)	Antonio Calderón	MF	12 (24)	2	4	1	16 (24)	3	1996	Rayo Vallecano
16	(Serbia)	Ilija Stolica	MF	6 (12)	-	3 (1)	2	9 (13)	2	1998	Zemun
17	(Spain)	Jordi Torrecilla	MF	10 (16)	-	6	-	16 (16)	-	1998	Espanyol B
20	(Spain)	Josep Setvalls	MF	37 (2)	3	2 (1)	1	39 (3)	4	1997	Barça Atlètic
-	(Brazil)	Luis Simplício	MF	12 (5)	-	3 (1)	-	15 (6)	-	1998	Portuguesa
-	(Spain)	Marc Callicó	MF	1 (3)	-	-	-	1 (3)	-	1998	Vilassar
Forwards
7	(Spain)	Gerard Escoda	CF	38 (2)	7	2 (4)	-	40 (6)	7	1996	Nàstic
9	(Spain)	Raúl Tamudo	CF	9 (5)	5	4	1	13 (5)	6	1998	Espanyol
11	(Spain)	Juan Carlos Moreno	CF	24 (7)	1	1 (3)	1	25 (10)	2	1998	Albacete
15	(Spain)	Pablo Maqueda	CF	10 (19)	6	2	-	12 (19)	6	1998	Avispa
18	(Argentina)	Marcos Lencina	CF	0 (1)	-	3	-	3 (1)	-	1999	Osorno
23	(Spain)	Josemi Pérez	CF	23 (7)	12	2 (2)	1	25 (9)	13	1998	Mallorca
-	(Spain)	Aitor García	CF	0 (1)	-	0 (2)	2	0 (3)	2	1998	Academy
-	(Spain)	Fido Porcar	CF	0 (5)	-	-	-	0 (5)	-	1998	Vilassar
-	(Romania)	Sabin Ilie	CF	15 (5)	3	-	-	15 (5)	3	1998	Valencia
