= Belhassen =

Belhassen is a family name frequent in Tunisia. It may refer to:

- Belhassen Aloui (born 1973), Tunisian footballer
- Belhassen Oueslati, current Tunisia's military speaker
- Belhassen Trabelsi (born 1962), Tunisian businessman

== See also ==
- Joël Bellassen (born 1950), French linguist
- Laurent Belissen (1693–1762), French Baroque composer
