= Mamdouh bin Abdul Rahman Al Saud =

Saudi prince

- Spouse: Hassa bint Salman Al Saud (divorced)
- Issue: Prince Saud; Princess Al Jawhara; Princess Al Hunuf; Princess Al Rym
Names
- Mamdouh bin Abdul Rahman bin Saud bin Abdulaziz bin Abdul Rahman Al Saud
- House: Al Saud
- Father: Abdul Rahman bin Saud
- Mother: Anoud bint Abdallah bin Abdul Rahman

Mamdouh bin Abdul Rahman bin Saud (Arabic: ممدوح بن عبد الرحمن آل سعود) is a Saudi prince who was the 10th president of Al-Nassr Club from 2005 to 2006.

== Biography ==
Mamdouh bin Abdul Rahman is a grandson of King Saud and the son of Abdul Rahman bin Saud Al Saud, the President of Al-Nassr Club. In addition, he is the nephew of Sultan bin Saud, the 6th President of Al-Nassr and the half-brother of Faisal bin Abdul Rahman bin Saud, the 8th President of the club. In April 2015 Mamdouh was banned from joining sports-related activities in Saudi Arabia for one year due to his racist remarks.
