= Faisal bin Abdul Rahman Al Saud =

Saudi prince

Names
- Faisal bin Abdul Rahman bin Saud bin Abdulaziz bin Abdul Rahman Al Saud
- House: Al Saud
- Father: Abdul Rahman bin Saud Al Saud
- Mother: Jawhara bint Nasir bin Abdulaziz Al Saud

Faisal bin Abdul Rahman Al Saud (Arabic: فيصل بن عبد الرحمن آل سعود Fayṣal bin 'Abd ar Raḥman Āl Su'ūd) is a Saudi prince who was the 8th president of Al-Nassr Club. He was the head of Al-Nassr from 1997 to 2000, where he led the club to the FIFA Club World Cup in Brazil, and from 2006 onward.

He is a grandson of King Saud and the son of Prince Abdul Rahman bin Saud Al Saud, the godfather of Al-Nassr Club. In addition, he is the nephew of Prince Sultan bin Saud, the 6th president of Al-Nassr, and the half-brother of Mamdouh bin Abdul Rahman bin Saud, the 10th president of the club.
