= Ricardo Gomes da Silva =

Portuguese footballer (born 1976)

Ricardo Silva
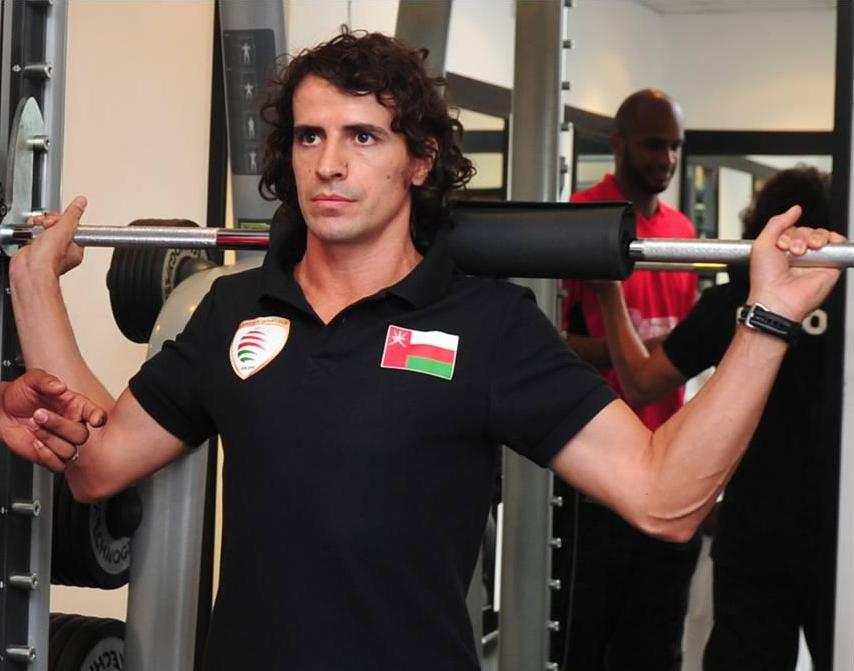
- Born: 24 September 1976 (age 50); Porto, Portugal
- Occupation: Sports fitness trainer
- Height: 1.75 m (5 ft 9 in)

Ricardo André Gomes da Silva commonly known as Ricardo Silva (born 24 September 1976) is a Portuguese football fitness coach, a rehabilitation specialist, a sports scientist and a fitness coordinator who is the current head of football fitness department of the Oman Football Association.

== Fitness coaching career ==
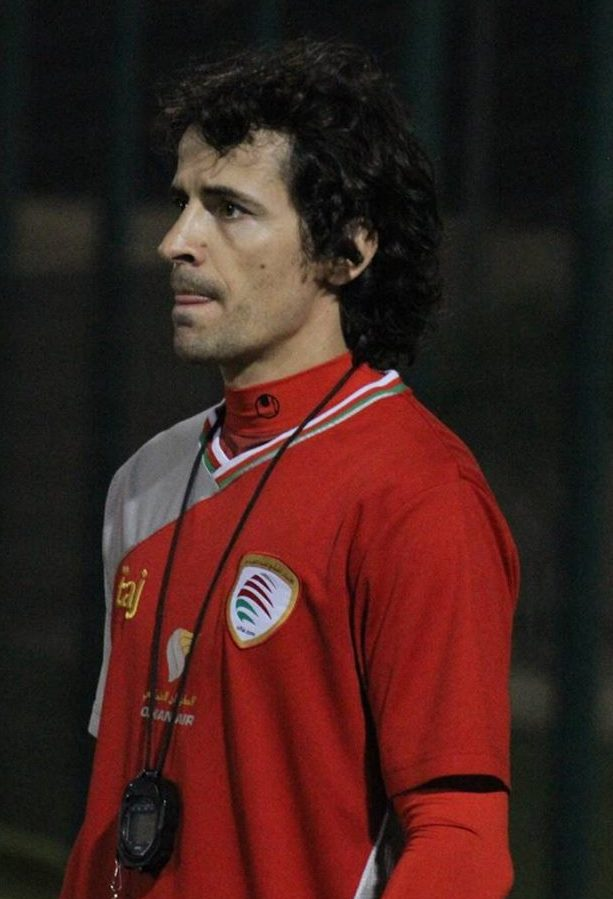
Ricardo Silva - Oman U-23

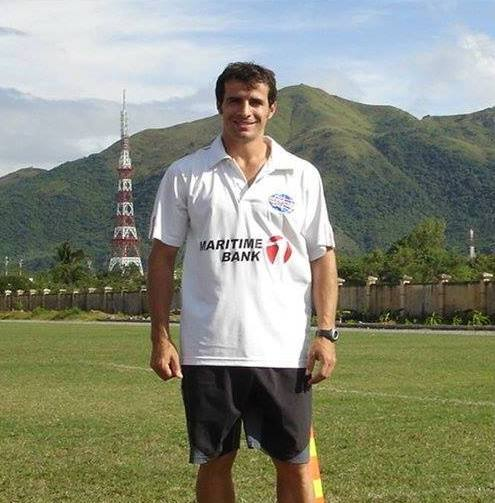
Ricardo Silva - Becamex Binh Duong

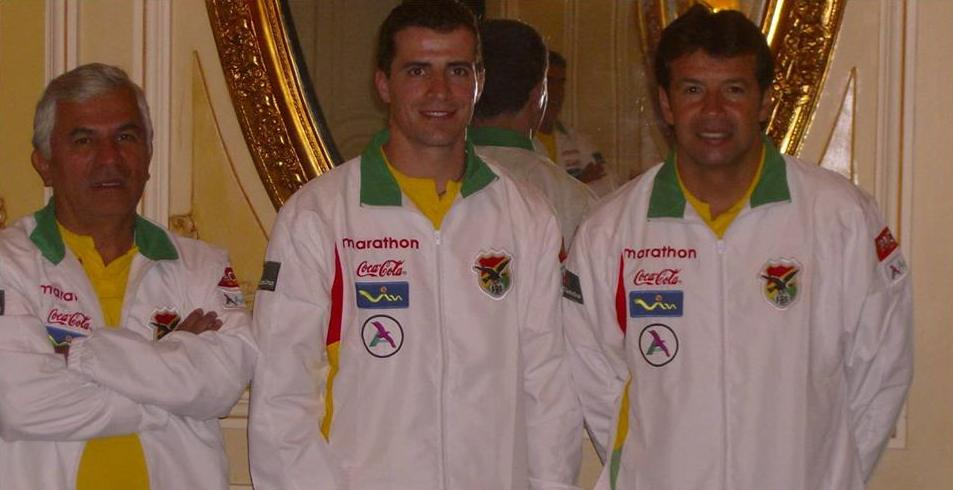
Ricardo Silva - Bolivia

Ricardo is a graduate in Sports Science from the Faculdade de Desporto da Universidade do Porto. He also holds the FIFA Football Emergency Certificate and the FIFA Football Fitness Coaching Certificate from FIFA. He holds the Personal Training Certificate from Holmes Place Academy, Paço de Arcos and has a detailed knowledge of Proprioception and Cryotherapy. He has worked as an instructor for Level 1 and Level 2 football fitness courses organised by Portuguese Football Federation. He has also taken part in various football fitness courses organised by the Oman Football Association in coordination with FIFA.

=== Portugal ===
Ricardo began his coaching career as a fitness coach in 1999 with his hometown, Porto-based Primeira Liga club, Boavista F.C. where he worked with teams of different levels. In his six-year long stay with the Porto-based club, he worked with Portuguese international and former Liverpool F.C. and Chelsea F.C. player, Raul Meireles.

=== Bolivia ===
He first moved out of Portugal in 2008 to South American nation, Bolivia where he was appointed to support the fitness staff under the Bolivian fitness coach, Jose Antonio Vaca of the Bolivia national football team under former Bolivia national team head coach, Erwin Sánchez. In his two-year stint with the South American nation, he participated in various games as the fitness coach which also included 2010 FIFA World Cup Qualification which included a famous 6–1 victory over South American giants, Argentina, a team which included the likes of Lionel Messi and Javier Zanetti.

=== Vietnam ===
In 2010, he again moved out of Portugal and this time to Southeast Asia and more accurately to Vietnam where he signed a one-year contract with V.League 1 club, Becamex Binh Duong F.C. under then the head coach of the Thủ Dầu Một-based club, Ricardo Formosinho. He helped his side achieve the runners-up position in the 2011 BTV Cup where his side lost 2–0 to Brazilian side, Sociedade Esportiva Matsubara in the finals.

=== Oman ===
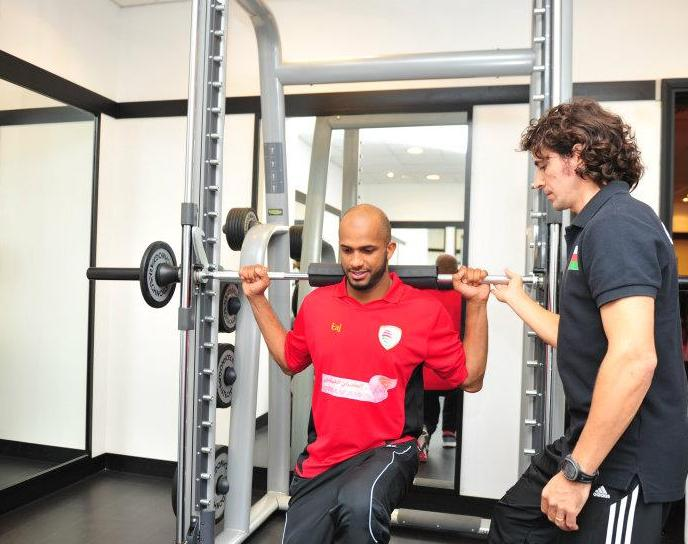
Ricardo Silva and Ali Al-Habsi - OFA Performance Center

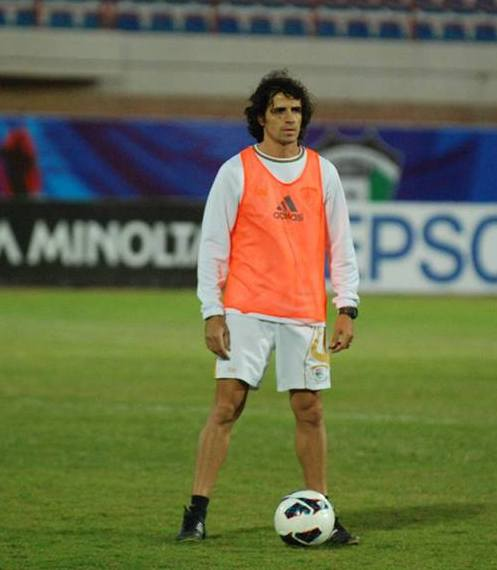
2012 WAFF Championship

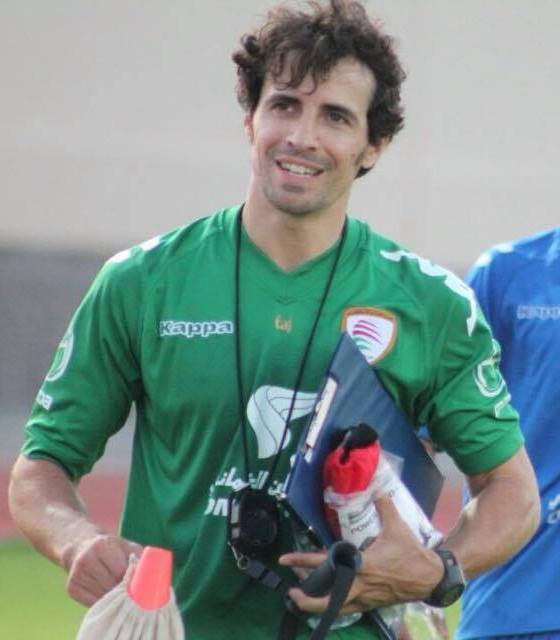
With Oman national football team

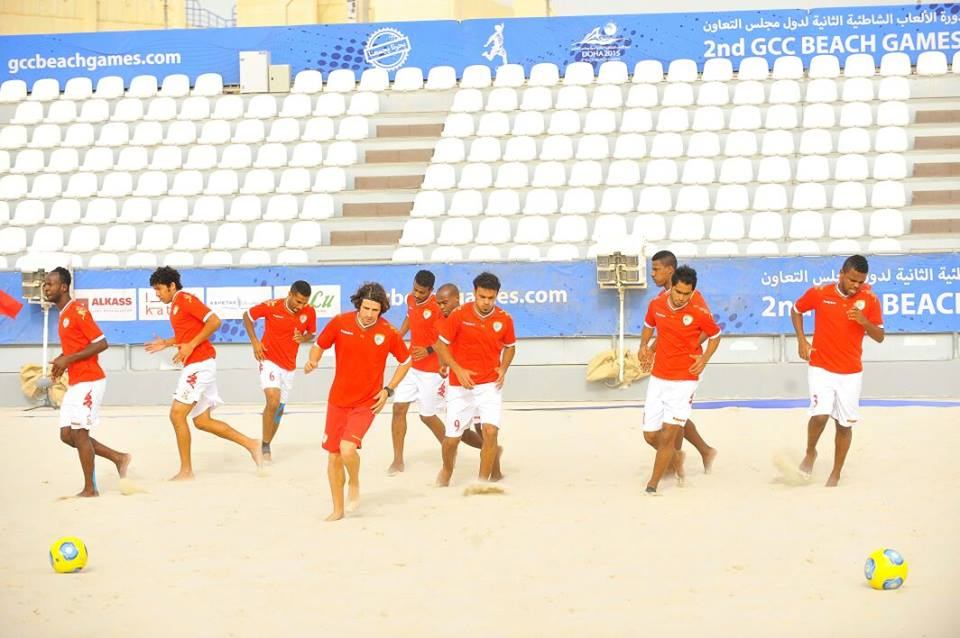
With Oman national beach soccer team

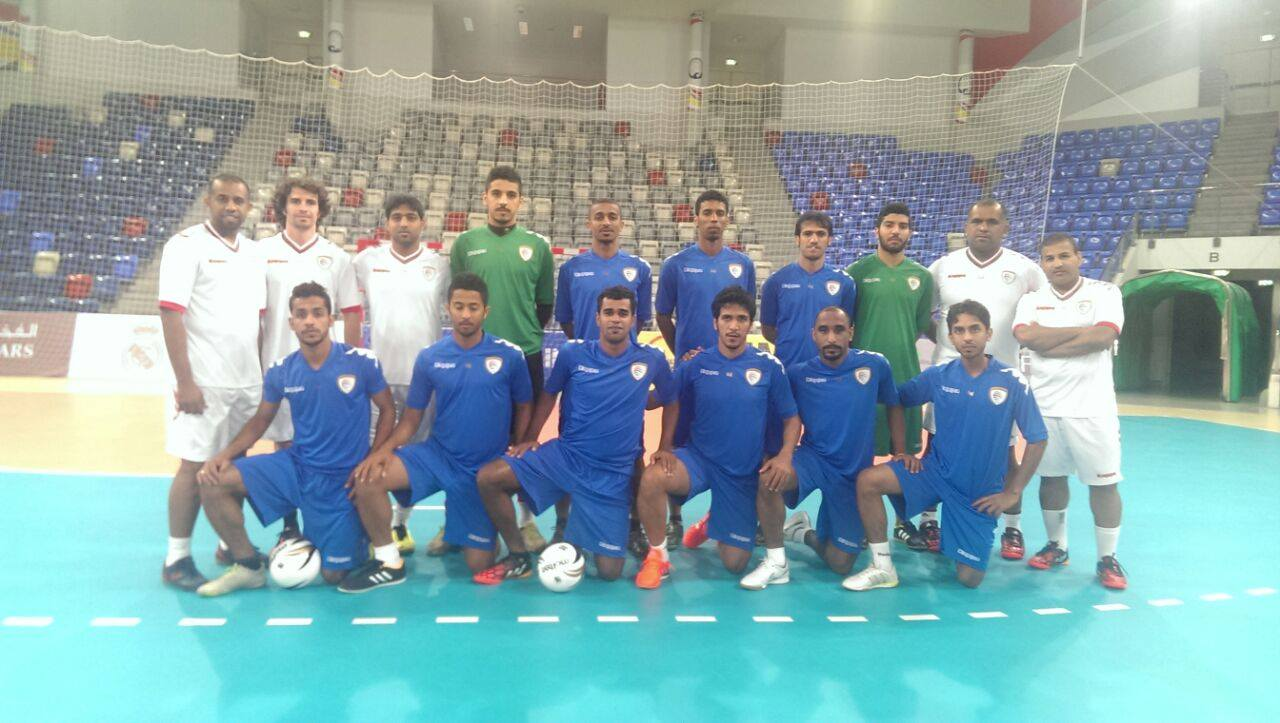
With Oman national futsal team

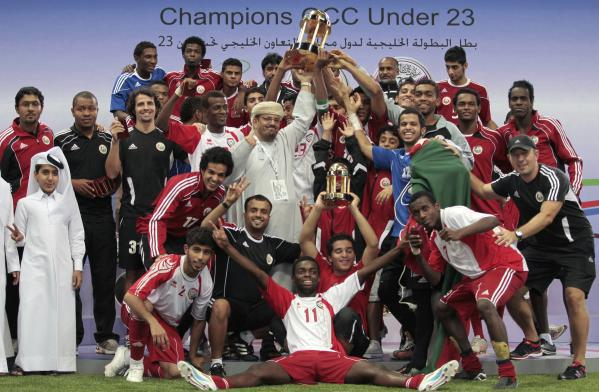
With Oman U-23 - 2011 GCC U-23 Championship

In 2011, he moved to the Middle East and more accurately to Oman where he was appointed as the head fitness coordinator of the Oman Football Association to work as the fitness coach and rehabilitation specialist with national teams of various levels and also the Oman national beach soccer team and the Oman national futsal team.

He first worked as the fitness coach for Omani football manager, Hamad Al-Azani's Oman national under-23 football team with whom he helped his side win the 2011 GCC U-23 Championship which was held in region's famous, Aspire Dome, Doha, Qatar and also participated as the fitness coach in the Men's Asian Qualifiers of the 2012 Summer Olympics. He also helped the U-23 side achieve the second runners-up position in the 2012 WAFF Championship under former Oman U-23 head coach, Philippe Burle.

He was appointed as the fitness coach for the Oman national beach soccer team in 2015. He helped his side win the gold medal in the 2015 GCC Beach Games which is the nation's best ever achievement in the competition's history. He also helped them win the 2015 AFC Beach Soccer Championship where in the finals they defeated Asian beach soccer giants, Japan 3–2 on penalties and thus earning a spot in the 2015 FIFA Beach Soccer World Cup which was held in Espinho, Portugal.

In early 2018, the Portuguese helped Oman win only its 2nd Arabian Gulf Cup title defeating the United Arab Emirates in the final on penalties following a goalless draw.

== Honours ==
=== National team ===
- Arabian Gulf Cup (1): 2017
