= Tisir Al-Antaif =

Saudi Arabian former footballer (born 1974)

Personal information
- Full name: Tisir Ahmed A. Al-Antaif
- Date of birth: 16 February 1974 (age 52)
- Place of birth: Dammam, Saudi Arabia
- Height: 1.83 m (6 ft 0 in)
- Position: Goalkeeper

Youth career
- Al-Ittifaq

Senior career*
Years	Team	Apps	(Gls)
1993–2000	Al-Ittifaq		
2000–2004	Al-Ahli		
2004–2005	Al-Khaleej		
2005–2011	Al-Ittihad		
2011–2013	Al-Faisaly	51	(0)
2013	Al-Nahda		

International career
1997–2008	Saudi Arabia	6	(0)
- * Club domestic league appearances and goals

Tisir Ahmed Al-Antaif (Arabic: تيسير الأنتيف; born February 16, 1974, in Dammam) is a Saudi Arabian former footballer playing in the goalkeeper role.

He played for Al-Ittifaq at club level and for the national team at the 1998 FIFA World Cup.
