= Ahmad Khaleel =

Saudi Arabian footballer (born 1970)

Personal information
- Full name: Ahmad Khaleel Rashid Al-Shaaban Al-Dossary
- Date of birth: 29 July 1970 (age 56)
- Place of birth: Dammam, Saudi Arabia
- Position: Defender

Senior career*
| Years | Team | Apps | (Gls) |
| 1998–1999 | Ettifaq | | |
| 1999–2007 | Al Hilal | | |
| 2007–2008 | Khaleej | | |
| 2008 | Al-Tai | | |

International career
| 1998–2006 | Saudi Arabia | 27 | (0) |
- * Club domestic league appearances and goals

Ahmad Khaleel Rashid Al-Shaaban Al-Dossary (Arabic: أحمد خليل رشيد الشعبان الدوسري; born 29 July 1970) is a Saudi Arabian former professional footballer who played as a defender.

Khaleel represented Saudi Arabia internationally as their captain at the 2000 AFC Asian Cup.
