= Ahmed Bahja =

Moroccan footballer (born 1970)

Personal information
- Date of birth: 21 December 1970 (age 55)
- Place of birth: Marrakesh, Morocco
- Height: 1.83 m (6 ft 0 in)
- Position: Forward

Senior career*
Years	Team	Apps	(Gls)
1989–1996	KAC Marrakech		
1994–1995	Al-Hilal		(7)
1996–1999	Al-Ittihad		(59)
1999	Al Wasl		(0)
2000	Al Nassr		(1)
2002	Al-Nasr SC (Dubai)		(4)
2002–2003	Raja CA		
2003–2005	Maghreb Fez		
2005	Al Khartoum SC		(2)
2005–2007	Najm de Marrakech		

International career
1990–1992	Morocco U23	4	(2)
1994–2000	Morocco	23	(8)
- * Club domestic league appearances and goals

Ahmed Bahja (Arabic: أحمد البهجة; born 21 December 1970) is a Moroccan retired footballer. He played for several clubs, including KAC Marrakech, Raja CA. and Dubai's Al Wasl F.C.. In addition, he played for Al Nassr, Al-Ittihad, Al-Hilal in Saudi Arabia and Al-Gharafa in Qatar 2 loan spells 1996 & 1998 for Qatar Emir Cup.

Bahja played for the Morocco national football team and was a participant at the 1992 Summer Olympics and the 1994 FIFA World Cup.

== Career statistics ==
=== Club ===
As of 19 March 2023

Club	Season	Saudi Pro League		Saudi Federation Cup		Crown Prince Cup		AFC Cup Winners Cup		Other		Total	
Club	Season	Apps	Goals	Apps	Goals	Apps	Goals	Apps	Goals	Apps	Goals	Apps	Goals
Al-Hilal	1994–95		7		5		3			4	4 (Note: Appearances in 1994 Arab Club Champions Cup)		17
Career total			7		5		3			4	4		17
Al Ittihad	1996–97		25		12		2						39
Al Ittihad	1997–98	15	6		5								11
Al Ittihad	1998–99		10		4				6	4	3 (Note: Appearances in 1998 Arab Club Champions Cup)		23
Career total			41		21		2		6	4	3		73
Al Nassr	1999–2000		1							3	1 (Note: Appearance in 2000 FIFA Club World Cup)		2
Career total			1							3	1		2

=== International ===
Scores and results list Morocco's goal tally first, score column indicates score after each Bahja goal.

List of international goals scored by Ahmed Bahja
No.	Date	Venue	Opponent	Score	Result	Competition
1	18 March 1992	Stade Mohammed V, Casablanca, Morocco	United States	1–0	3–1	Friendly
2	11 December 1996	Stade Mohammed V, Casablanca, Morocco	Croatia	2–2	2–2 (6–7 p)	1996 King Hassan II International Cup Tournament
3	6 April 1997	Stade Omar Bongo, Libreville, Gabon	Gabon	1–0	4–0	1998 FIFA World Cup qualification
4	6 April 1997	Stade Omar Bongo, Libreville, Gabon	Gabon	2–0	4–0	1998 FIFA World Cup qualification
5	31 May 1997	Prince Moulay Abdellah Stadium, Rabat, Morocco	Ethiopia	2–0	4–0	1998 Africa Cup of Nations qualification
6	17 August 1997	Stade Mohammed V, Casablanca, Morocco	Gabon	2–0	2–0	1998 FIFA World Cup qualification
7	5 February 1998	El Harti Stadium, Marrakesh, Morocco	Niger	3–0	3–0	Friendly
8	9 February 1998	Stade Omnisports, Bobo-Dioulasso, Burkina Faso	Zambia	1–0	1–1	1998 Africa Cup of Nations

== Honours ==
Ittihad

- Saudi Premier League: 1996/1997
- Saudi Premier League: 1998/1999
- Saudi Federation Cup: 1996/1997
- Saudi Federation Cup: 1998/1999
- Saudi Crown Prince Cup: 1996/1997
- Asian Cup Winners Cup : 1999

Hillal

- Saudi Crown Prince Cup: 1994/1995
- Arab Club Champions Cup:1994

Individual

- SFA Forward of the Season: 1997
- Arabian Golden Shoe: 1997
- Saudi Premier League Top Scorer: 1996–97:25 goals
- Saudi Federation Cup Top Scorer: 1996–97 :12 goals
- Asian Cup Winners Cup Top Scorer : 1999 : 6 goals
- Qatar Emir Cup Top Scorer : 1998 : 10 goals
- Arab Cup Winners' Cup Top Scorer : 1996 : 4 goals
- Botola Pro 1 Top Scorer : 93/1994 : 14 goals
