= Belhassen Aloui =

Tunisian footballer

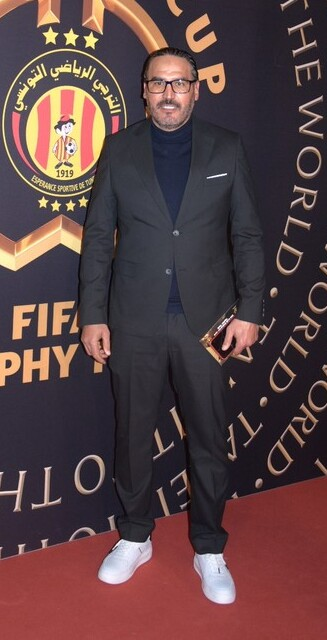
- Belhassen Aloui in 2025

Personal information
- Date of birth: 17 March 1973 (age 53)
- Place of birth: Tunis, Tunisia
- Height: 1.83 m (6 ft 0 in)
- Position: Forward

Senior career*
Years	Team	Apps	(Gls)
1992–1994	ES Tunis	5	(1)
1994–1996	Hammam-Lif	38	(33)
1996–1997	Club Africain	26	(7)
1997–1998	CO Médenine	7	(1)
1998–1999	Club Africain	17	(0)
1999–2002	Hammam-Lif	19	(2)
2005	Binh Duong		
2006	Mikado Nam Dinh		
2007	Da Nang		

International career
1995–1996	Tunisia	8	(2)
- * Club domestic league appearances and goals

Belhassen Aloui (born 17 March 1973) is a Tunisian footballer. He played in eight matches for the Tunisia national football team in 1995 and 1996. He was also named in Tunisia's squad for the 1996 African Cup of Nations tournament.
