= 1993–94 Saudi Premier League =

Saudi Premier League
- Season: 1993–94
- Champions: Al-Nassr (5th title)
- Relegated: Al-Nahda; Ohod
- Asian Club Championship: Al-Nassr
- Top goalscorer: Moussa N'Daw (15 goals)

Statistics of the 1993–94 Saudi Premier League season. Al-Nassr won the league title after beating city neighbours Al-Riyadh in the final.

== Overview ==
The end of season playoffs were changed to one-legged affairs from the previous home-and-away two-legged matchups.

Allowed the team record 3 foreign players in this year, and preparations for the national team camps.

This was the first season a non-Saudi player won the top scorer award.

== Stadia and locations ==
Locations of teams in the 1993-94 Saudi Premier League

Club	Location	Stadium
Al-Ahli	Jeddah	Prince Abdullah Al-Faisal Stadium
Al-Ettifaq	Dammam	Prince Mohamed bin Fahd Stadium
Al-Hilal	Riyadh	King Fahd Stadium
Al-Ittihad	Jeddah	Prince Abdullah Al-Faisal Stadium
Al-Nassr	Riyadh	King Fahd Stadium
Al-Nahda	Khobar	Prince Saud bin Jalawi Stadium
Al-Qadsiah	Al Khubar	Prince Saud bin Jalawi Stadium
Al-Raed	Buraydah	King Abdullah Sport City Stadium
Al-Riyadh	Riyadh	King Fahd Stadium
Al-Shabab	Riyadh	King Fahd Stadium
Ohod	Medina	Prince Mohammed bin Abdul Aziz Stadium
Al-Wehda	Mecca	King Abdul Aziz Stadium

== Final league table ==
Pos	Team	Pld	W	D	L	GF	GA	GD	Pts
1	Al-Hilal	22	12	8	2	36	14	+22	44
2	Al-Riyadh	22	11	6	5	29	17	+12	39
3	Al-Nassr	22	10	8	4	31	24	+7	38
4	Al-Shabab	22	10	7	5	27	16	+11	37
5	Al-Qadsiah	22	8	9	5	26	21	+5	33
6	Al-Ahli	22	8	6	8	30	26	+4	30
7	Al-Ittihad	22	6	11	5	20	18	+2	29
8	Al-Wehda	22	5	11	6	33	34	−1	26
9	Al-Ettifaq	22	6	8	8	21	26	−5	26
10	Al-Raed	22	5	7	10	25	43	−18	22
11	Al-Nahda	22	5	6	11	22	32	−10	21
12	Ohod	22	0	5	17	12	41	−29	5

Promoted: Al-Najma, Al-Rawdah

== Playoffs ==
=== Semifinals ===
21 April 1994	Al-Hilal	0–1	Al-Nassr	King Fahd Stadium, Riyadh
			15' Fahad Al-Bishi	Referee: Omer Al Mehannah

22 April 1994	Al-Riyadh	3–1 (a.e.t.)	Al-Shabab	King Fahd Stadium, Riyadh
	Abdulmohsen Al-Obeid 120'; Mohammed Al-Qadi 100'; Waleed Al-Zuhair 66'		60' Mansour Ayanda	Referee: Abdul Rahman Al-Zaid

=== Third place match ===
27 April 1994	Al-Hilal	4–1	Al-Shabab	Prince Faisal bin Fahd Stadium, Riyadh
	Bentinho 9'; Muhammad Lutfi 39'; Hussein Al-Massari 77'; Muhammad Lutfi 82'		93' Abdulaziz Al-Rozkan

=== Final ===
29 April 1994	Al-Nassr	1–0 (a.e.t.)	Al-Riyadh	King Fahd Stadium, Riyadh
			59' (o.g.) Talal Jebreen	Referee: Abdul Rahman Al-Zaid

Saudi Premier League 1993–94 winners

5th title
