= Victor Diagne =

Senegalese footballer

Personal information
- Date of birth: 5 July 1971 (age 55)
- Position: Forward

Senior career*
Years	Team	Apps	(Gls)
1990–1992	ASC Jaraaf		
1992–1994	Germinal Ekeren		

International career
1990–1996	Senegal	20	(4)
- * Club domestic league appearances and goals

Victor Diagne (born 5 July 1971) is a Senegalese footballer. He played in twenty matches for the Senegal national football team from 1990 to 1996. He was also named in Senegal's squad for the 1992 African Cup of Nations tournament.

== Career statistics ==
=== International ===
Appearances and goals by national team and year
National team	Year	Apps	Goals
Senegal	1990	1	0
Senegal	1991	11	3
Senegal	1992	3	1
Senegal	1993	2	1
Senegal	1994	–	
Senegal	1995	2	0
Senegal	1996	1	0
Total		20	4

Scores and results list Senegal's goal tally first, score column indicates score after each Diagne goal.

List of international goals scored by Victor Diagne
No.	Date	Venue	Opponent	Score	Result	Competition
1	17 February 1991	Stade de l'Amitié, Dakar, Senegal	Algeria	1–0	2–2 (3–1 p)	1991 Dakar Tournament
2	31 October 1991	Felix Houphouet Boigny Stadium, Abidjan, Ivory Coast	Ghana	2–0	3–2	1991 CEDEAO Cup
3	16 December 1991	Stade du 5 Juillet, Algiers, Algeria	Algeria	1–3	1–3	Friendly
4	16 January 1992	Stade de l'Amitié, Dakar, Senegal	Kenya	3–0	3–0	1992 Africa Cup of Nations
