= Ohene Kennedy =

Ghanaian footballer

Personal information
- Full name: Ohene Kennedy
- Date of birth: 28 April 1973 (age 53)
- Place of birth: Accra, Ghana
- Height: 1.81 m (5 ft 11 1/2 in)
- Position: Forward

Senior career*
Years	Team	Apps	(Gls)
1992–1993	Mysterious Dwarfs		
1993–1997	Al-Nassr	159	(74)
1997–2002	MKE Ankaragücü	106	(38)
2002–2003	Adanaspor	0	(0)
2003–2004	Dhanmondi Club		

International career
1994–2000	Ghana	7	(0)
- * Club domestic league appearances and goals

Ohene Kennedy (born 28 April 1973) is a retired Ghanaian football striker.

== Club career ==
Kennedy's golden days were with Al-Nassr in Saudi Arabia, where he played and scored many goals. He began his professional career at the Mysterious Dwarfs club of Ghana in the 1992–93 season, aged 19.

He joined Al-Nassr in 1993, and soon became one of the team's most valuable players and top scorers. In total, he scored 74 goals for Al-Nassr and won the Saudi league twice; 1994 and 1995, he also was the league's top scorer in 1996 with 14 goals. He had 4 hat-tricks during this period. On 10 November 1996, he scored a hat-trick for Al-Nassr to win 3–2 against Persepolis in the 1996–97 Asian Club Championship quarterfinals.

He later played in Turkey for MKE Ankaragücü and Adanaspor, then in Bangladesh for Dhanmondi Club.

== International career ==
He was part of the Ghanaian 2000 African Nations Cup team, who exited in the quarter-finals after losing to South Africa. He was also a member of the Ghanaian squad at the 1996 Summer Olympics.

== Post-retirement ==
Kennedy went to live in Croydon, England after retirement from football, where he worked for a transportation company called Dynamic Parcel Distribution (DPD).

== Career statistics ==
=== International ===
Ghana national team
Year	Apps	Goals
1994	2	0
1994	1	0
1996	0	0
1997	0	0
1998	2	0
1999	1	0
2000	1	0
Total	7	0

Statistics accurate as of match played 6 February 2000

== Honours ==
Al-Nassr

- Saudi Premier League: 1993–94, 1994–95
