= Abdul Rahman bin Saud Al Saud =

Saudi royal, government official and Al Nassr football club president (1946–2004)

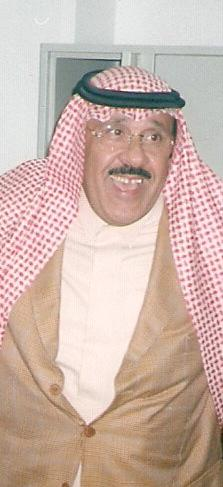
- Born: 19 November 1946; Riyadh, Saudi Arabia
- Died: 29 July 2004 (aged 57); Riyadh, Saudi Arabia
- Burial: 30 July 2004; Al Oud cemetery, Riyadh, Saudi Arabia
- Spouse: Princess Anoud bint Abdullah bin Abdul Rahman; Princess Jawhara bint Nasir bin Abdulaziz
- Issue: 9
Names
- Abdul Rahman bin Saud bin Abdulaziz
- House: Al Saud
- Father: King Saud
- Mother: Jawhara bint Turki bin Ahmed Al Sudairi
- Occupation: President of Al Nassr football club; Government official

Abdul Rahman bin Saud Al Saud (Arabic: عبد الرحمن بن سعود آل سعود ʿAbd ar Raḥman bin Suʿūd Āl Suʿūd; 19 November 1946 – 29 July 2004) was a Saudi prince, a son of King Saud, one of the grandsons of Saudi's founder King Abdulaziz, and the longtime president of the football club Al-Nassr.

== Biography ==
Prince Abdul Rahman was born in Riyadh on 19 November 1946. He was a son of King Saud. His mother was Al Jawhara bint Turki bin Ahmed Al Sudairi, who died when Prince Abdul Rahman was fifteen years old. Prince Abdul Rahman completed his education at Ma'had Al Anjal School.

Prince Abdul Rahman and his brother Prince Mishaal were the first sons of King Saud who declared allegiance to King Faisal, successor of the former, following the abdication of King Saud in 1964. His allegiance to King Faisal was announced on 25 November 1964. Then he began to serve as the director general of budget and finance at the ministry of finance.

He was known as the 'godfather' of the sports club Al-Nassr, having spent more than 36 years as its president. He had this role for three periods: 1960–1969, 1975–1997 and 2000–2005. During his tenure, Al-Nassr advanced from a second division club to a national champion.

=== Personal life ===
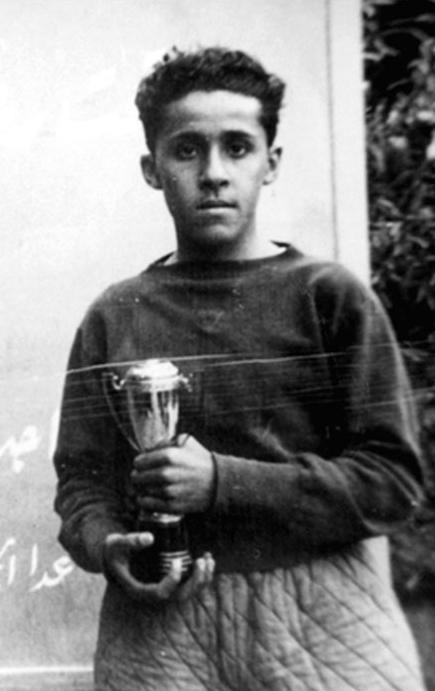
Abdul Rahman in his childhood

Prince Abdul Rahman married twice. He had six sons and three daughters.

Prince Abdul Rahman bin Saud had three sons and two daughters with Princess Al Anoud bint Abdullah, daughter of his father's uncle Abdullah bin Abdul Rahman:

- Prince Mamdouh, who has four children: Prince Saud, Princess Al Jawhara, Princess Al Hunuf, and Princess Al Rym.
- Princess Manal
- Princess Ahad
- Prince Saud
- Prince Fahd

Prince Abdul Rahman had three sons and one daughter with his paternal cousin Princess Al Jawhara bint Nasser, daughter of his uncle Prince Nasser bin Abdulaziz:

- Prince Khalid, who has seven children: Prince Bandar, Princess Al Jawhara, Prince Abdulaziz, Princess Mashael, Prince Abdul Rahman, Prince Saud, and Prince Mohammed.
- Prince Abdulaziz, who has three children: Princess Anoud, Princess Jawahir and Prince Abdulaziz.
- Prince Faisal
- Princess Al Jawhara

== Death ==
Prince Abdul Rahman died of a heart attack on 29 July 2004 at age of 57. His funeral prayers were performed at Imam Turki bin Abdullah Mosque in Riyadh on 30 July 2004.
