= Marcos Lencina =

Argentine footballer

Personal information
- Full name: Marcos Alejandro Lencina
- Date of birth: 29 March 1973 (age 53)
- Place of birth: Pergamino, Buenos Aires, Argentina
- Height: 1.77 m (5 ft 10 in)
- Position: Forward

Senior career*
| Years | Team | Apps | (Gls) |
| 1990–1997 | Douglas Haig | | |
| 1997 | Al-Ahli | 1 | (0) |
| 1997–1998 | Provincial Osorno | 8 | (2) |
| 1998 | Lleida | 1 | (0) |
| 1999 | Deportes Concepción | 18 | (3) |
| 2000 | Estudiantes RC | | |
| 2001 | Douglas Haig | | |
| 2001 | Swansea City | 0 | (0) |
| 2001–2003 | Fanfulla | | |
| 2003–2005 | Castellana | | |
| 2006 | Yupanqui | 1 | (0) |
| 2006–2007 | Lavagnese | | |

Managerial career
- 2016: Douglas Haig
- 2018: Defensores de Salto
- * Club domestic league appearances and goals

Marcos Alejandro Lencina (born 29 March 1973) is an Argentine former footballer who played for clubs of Argentina, Chile, Spain, England and Italy.

== Teams ==
=== Player ===
- (Argentina) Douglas Haig 1990–1997
- (Saudi Arabia) Al-Ahli 1997
- (Chile) Provincial Osorno 1997–1998
- (Spain) Lleida 1998
- (Chile) Deportes Concepción 1999
- (Argentina) Estudiantes de Río Cuarto 2000
- (Argentina) Douglas Haig 2001
- (Wales) Swansea City 2001
- (Italy) Fanfulla 2001–2003
- (Italy) Castellana 2003–2005
- (Argentina) Yupanqui 2006
- (Italy) Lavagnese 2006–2007

=== Manager ===
- (Argentina) Douglas Haig 2016
- (Argentina) Defensores de Salto 2018
