= Al-Nassr FC =

Association football club in Saudi Arabia

Al-Nassr
- Full name: Al-Nassr Football Club
- Nicknames: List: Al-Alami (The Global One); Faris Najd (Knight of Najd); Nadi Al-Shams (The sun club); Qalb Najd (Heart of Najd); Al-Asfar Al-Kabir (The big Yellow); Nassrawis (Supporters)
- Founded: October 24, 1955; 71 years ago
- Stadium: Al-Awwal Park
- Capacity: 25,000
- Owner(s): Public Investment Fund (75%); Al-Nassr Non-Profit Foundation (25%)
- President: Abdullah Al-Majid
- Head coach: Ange Postecoglou
- League: Saudi Pro League
- 2025–26: Pro League, 1st of 18 (champions)
- Website: alnassr.sa
Home colours	Away colours

Al-Nassr Football Club, commonly known as Al-Nassr or simply Nassr (Arabic: نادي النصر), is a Saudi Arabian professional association football club based in Riyadh. Founded in 1955, the club competes in the Saudi Pro League, the top tier of football in Saudi Arabia, and is one of three teams never relegated from the top flight.

== History ==
=== Beginnings and triumphs (1955–1989) ===
Al Nassr was established in 1955 by the Al-Ja'ba brothers. Training took place in an old playground at Gashlat Al-Shortah, west shirts. In addition to the Al-Ja'ba brothers, Ali and Al-Owais, Prince Abdul Rahman bin Saud Al Saud became the head of Al Nassr, he spent more than 39 years as the president for 3 stints until his death. His love of the team made him accept the challenge of being the president of a second-division club and turning it into a champion, and therefore, he is known as Al-Nassr's Godfather. They were promoted to the first division in 1963. During the 1970s and 1980s, the club won one Categorization League and three Saudi Premier League titles, Five King's Cups, two Crown Prince's Cups, and one Federation Cup. The team's success was built around the "Saudi Golden Trio" of Majed Abdullah, Fahd Al-Bishi and Mohaisen Al-Jam'an.

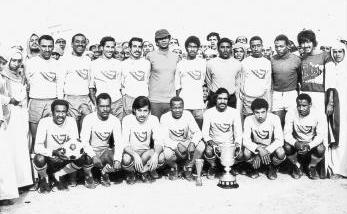
Picture for the team with trophies won in 1974

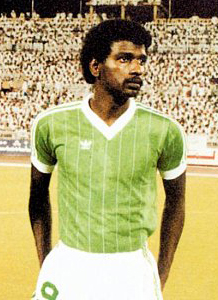
Majed Ahmed Abdullah is Al Nassr's all-time leader in goals scored and appearances.

=== End of the Majed Abdullah era (1989–2000) ===
In the 1990s (year), Al Nassr managed to win two further Saudi Premier League titles in the 1993–1994 and 1994–1995 seasons, the 1990 King's Cup and the 1997–1998 Federation Cup. Towards the end of Majed Abdullah's career, he still wasn't able to lift the ultimate prize in UAFA region; the Arab Club Champions Cup while the other top clubs in Saudi already succeeded in doing this. Despite that, Al Nassr managed to triumph in the continental tournaments. The 37-year-old striker, Majed Abdullah at the time, managed to win two GCC Club Cups, one Asian Cup Winners' Cup and one Asian Super Cup. Majed Abdullah announced his retirement on 12 April 1998 following Al-Nassr's win in the 1998 Asian Cup Winner's Cup against Suwon Samsung Bluewings from South Korea in front of 70,000 fans in Riyadh. Majed retired at 39 years old as the all-time top scorer of the Saudi League with 189 goals and is also Al-Nassr's all-time top scorer with 260 goals, a record that was considered untouchable until the coming of Abderrazak Hamdallah.

After becoming champion of the Asian Super Cup, Al-Nassr was eligible to represent the AFC region in the first FIFA Club World Cup. In that championship Al-Nassr played against Corinthians, Real Madrid and Raja Casablanca and finished 3rd in the group, the club became the first team to officially represent Asia in an international tournament, which was held in Brazil from 5 January to 14 January, in the year 2000. The nickname "The Global One (Al-Alami)" was obtained following their respective participation in the Club World Cup. Al Nassr won the FIFA Fair Play Award and 6th place following the end of the Club World Cup and was the first team in the world to win the award.

==== Participating squad in the World Cup ====
Number		Player
Goalkeepers
1	(Saudi Arabia)	Mansoor Al-Qahtani
22	(Saudi Arabia)	Mohammed Al-Khojali
9	(Saudi Arabia)	Mohamed Shareefy
Defenders
2	(Saudi Arabia)	Nasser Al Halawi
5	(Morocco)	Smahi Triki
4	(Saudi Arabia)	Saleh Aboshahin
12	(Saudi Arabia)	Hamad Al Khathran
16	(Saudi Arabia)	Abdulaziz Al-Janoubi
20	(Saudi Arabia)	Mohsin Harthi
21	(Saudi Arabia)	Hadi Sharify
23	(Saudi Arabia)	Ibrahim Al Shokia
Midfielders
3	(Saudi Arabia)	Faisal Al Dosari
6	(Saudi Arabia)	Ibrahim Al-Harbi
8	(Saudi Arabia)	Fahad Al-Bishi
10	(Saudi Arabia)	Fuad Amin
14	(Saudi Arabia)	Nassib Al Ghamdi
17	(Saudi Arabia)	Mansour Al-Mousa
18	(Saudi Arabia)	Abdullah Al Karni
Forwards
7	(Saudi Arabia)	Fahad Al-Mehallel
11	(Saudi Arabia)	Mohaisn Al-Jam'aan
13	(Morocco)	Ahmed Bahja
15	(Saudi Arabia)	Nahar Al Dhaferi
19	(Algeria)	Moussa Saïb
Manager
	(Serbia and Montenegro)	Milan Živadinović

=== Decline (2001–2007) ===
Following the retirement of the Golden Trio, Al-Nassr’s squad reached the FIFA Club World Cup for the first time. The club signed international players including Ivory Coast forward Fadel Keïta and former Barcelona midfielder Julio César Baldivieso.

Results declined in subsequent seasons. In 2006–07 Al-Nassr finished ninth with 21 points and avoided relegation on the final matchday. Honorary members, including Majed Abdullah, intervened to begin a long-term restructuring of the club’s management. During this period Al-Hilal recorded more derby victories against Al-Nassr than in any previous era.

=== Revival (2008–2015) ===
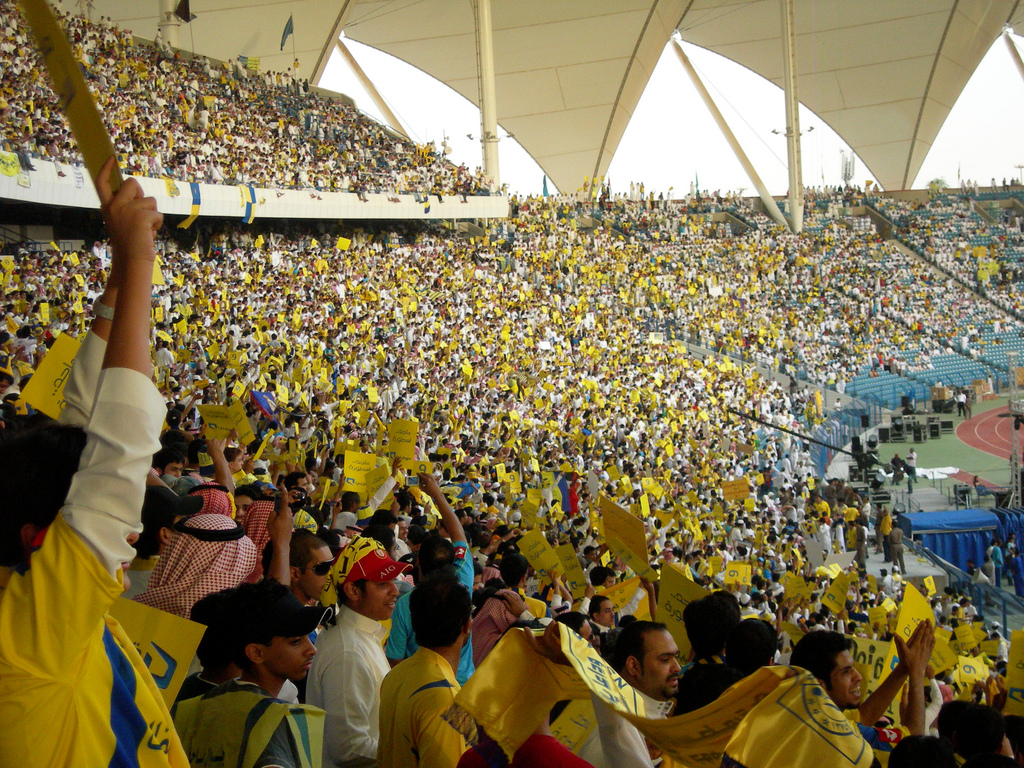
Al-Nassr supporters at the King Fahd International Stadium in 2008

After a major overhaul of the playing staff, Al-Nassr defeated city rivals Al-Hilal to win the 2008 Federation Cup. In 2009 the club signed Mohammad Al-Sahlawi from Al-Qadsiah for a reported SR32 million, then a domestic record.

In his first season Al-Sahlawi scored 21 goals in 36 matches and was named Young Player of the Year by STC. Al-Nassr finished third in the 2009–10 league and qualified for the 2011 AFC Champions League.

==== 2011 AFC Champions League ====
Al-Nassr finished second in their group. Results included a 2–2 draw with Pakhtakor (goal by loaned player Bader Al-Mutawa), a 2–1 win over Esteghlal (Hussein Abdulghani), a 1–0 defeat to Al-Sadd, a further draw with Al-Sadd, a 4–0 victory over Pakhtakor (goals by Saud Hamood, Al-Sahlawi and two by Al-Mutawa), and a 2–1 loss to Esteghlal. In the round of 16 the club was eliminated 4–1 by Zob Ahan. Al-Mutawa scored five goals in the competition before returning to Kuwait.

==== League and cup success ====
Under coach Francisco Maturana in 2011–12 Al-Nassr reached the Crown Prince Cup final but lost to Al-Hilal on penalties. In 2013–14, with José Daniel Carreño as coach, the team recorded a 22-match unbeaten run and won both the Saudi Pro League and the Crown Prince Cup against Al-Hilal, qualifying for the 2015 AFC Champions League.

Al-Nassr retained the league title in 2014–15. The side lost the King’s Cup final and exited the Crown Prince Cup in the semi-finals. In the 2015 AFC Champions League the team finished bottom of a group containing Bunyodkor, Al-Duhail and Persepolis. Al-Sahlawi scored 25 goals in 37 appearances that season. René Higuita was appointed coach but the club again failed to progress beyond the group stage of the 2016 AFC Champions League.

=== Hamdallah era (2016–2022) ===
Al-Nassr finished third in the 2016–17 league behind Al-Ahli and Al-Hilal. The club were runners-up in both the Crown Prince Cup and the King’s Cup and did not qualify for the AFC Champions League in 2017 or 2018. Al-Sahlawi scored 10, 11 and 12 league goals across the three seasons from 2015–16 to 2017–18.

In March 2018 coach Gustavo Quinteros signed Sultan Al-Ghannam on a free transfer from Al-Faisaly. In the summer the club added Moroccan players Abderrazak Hamdallah and Nordin Amrabat. Hamdallah finished the 2018–19 season as league top scorer with 34 goals and helped Al-Nassr win the title. He also scored heavily in the King’s Cup, including multiple hat-tricks. At the end of the calendar year he was recognised by the IFFHS as the world’s leading goalscorer with 57 goals. Al-Sahlawi left for Al-Shabab.

Al-Nassr won the Saudi Super Cup in January 2020 (1–1 draw with Al-Taawoun, Hamdallah scoring) and again in January 2021 (3–0 against Al-Hilal). In the 2019 AFC Champions League the club reached the quarter-finals before losing to Al-Sadd; Hamdallah scored four goals. In the 2020 edition Al-Nassr reached the semi-finals, losing on penalties to Persepolis. Hamdallah shared the golden boot with seven goals.

Hamdallah’s contract was terminated in November 2020 although he remained available until the end of the season. In May and June 2021 the club signed Talisca (reported €9.5 million) and Vincent Aboubakar (reported €6 million). Both scored on debut in a 4–1 win over Damac in August 2021. Under coaches Miguel Ángel Russo and later Rudi Garcia the team finished without major trophies in 2021–22. Talisca scored a hat-trick in a 4–1 win at Al-Raed.

=== Ronaldo era (2023–present) ===
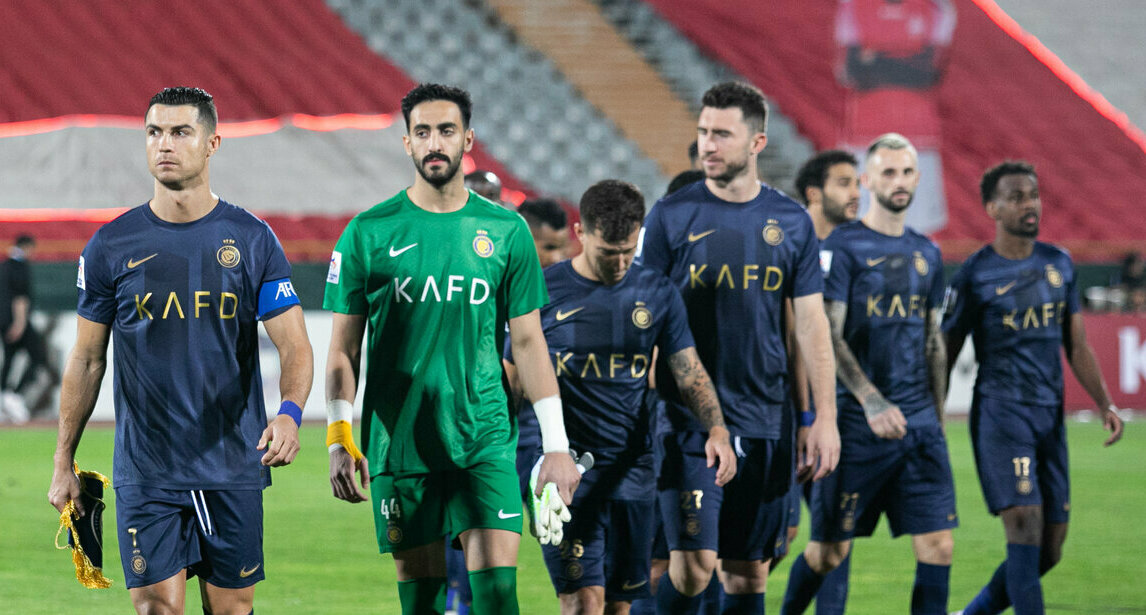
Cristiano Ronaldo captaining Al-Nassr in 2023

On 30 December 2022 Al-Nassr signed Cristiano Ronaldo on a two-and-a-half-year contract later extended. The reported annual salary was among the highest ever paid to a footballer. Al-Nassr finished second in the 2022–23 Saudi Pro League.

==== 2023–2024 ====
Al-Nassr won the 2023 Arab Club Champions Cup. After drawing 0–0 with Al-Shabab, beating US Monastir 4–1 (Ronaldo scoring) and drawing 1–1 with Zamalek, the side defeated Raja Casablanca 3–1 and Al-Shorta 1–0 (Ronaldo penalty). In the final against Al-Hilal, Al-Nassr came from 1–0 down, finished with ten men, and won 2–1 after extra time with both goals scored by Ronaldo. He finished as the tournament’s top scorer with six goals.

In the summer of 2023 the club added Otávio, Sadio Mané, Aymeric Laporte, Seko Fofana, Marcelo Brozović, Aziz Behich and Alex Telles. At the end of 2023 Al-Nassr stood second in the league. The side topped their AFC Champions League group unbeaten and reached the King’s Cup semi-finals. Talisca led the AFC Champions League scoring charts with eight group-stage goals.

Ronaldo was named the IFFHS World’s best goalscorer for 2023 with 54 goals. Al-Nassr were eliminated from the 2023–24 AFC Champions League by Al-Ain on penalties after a 4–4 aggregate. The club also lost the King’s Cup final on penalties, exited the Super Cup in the semi-finals, and finished second in the league with a club-record 82 points. Ronaldo won the golden boot and set a new single-season league scoring record.

==== 2024–2025 ====
President Ibrahim al-Muhaidib resigned in 2024. New signings included Mohamed Simakan, Ângelo Gabriel, Wesley and Bento. Luís Castro was replaced by Stefano Pioli in September 2024. The club launched “Nassr TV” in partnership with DAZN.

In January 2025 Majid Al-Jam’an replaced Guido Fienga as executive director. The club signed Jhon Durán and sold Seko Fofana to Rennes for a reported €20 million. In July 2025, José Semedo became acting CEO, Simão Coutinho was appointed sporting director, and Jorge Jesus replaced Pioli as manager. Further arrivals included João Félix, Iñigo Martínez and Kingsley Coman. Later in August 2025, Al-Nassr lost the Saudi Super Cup final to Al-Ahli on penalties.

==== 2025–2026 ====
During the 2025–26 season under Jesus, Al-Nassr reached the AFC Champions League 2 Final but were defeated by Gamba Osaka. The club went on to win the Saudi Pro League title. Following the season, Jorge Jesus departed the club. Ange Postecoglou was subsequently appointed as manager, with Samu Costa joining the squad as a new signing.

== Crests and colours ==
=== Crests ===
1955

1971

2009

2011

2020

2025

Al-Nassr (Arabic: النصر) is the Arabic word for "victory". While several football clubs across the Arab world share this name, the Saudi Arabian club Al-Nassr FC was the first to adopt it.

The club’s logo features a stylized map of the Arabian Peninsula, symbolising the team's regional identity. The yellow colour in the logo represents the sands of the Arabian deserts, while the blue represents surrounding bodies of water, including the Arabian Sea, the Arabian Gulf, and the Red Sea.

=== Kit suppliers and shirt sponsors ===
Period	Kit manufacturer	Shirt main sponsor
1955–1978	In-House	None
1979–1980	Adidas	None
1981–1988	In-House	None
1989–1990	Duarig	None
1991–1996	In-House	None
1997–2001	Nike	None
2002–2005	In-House	None
2006–2008	Lotto	Al-Jawal
2008–2010	STC	None
2010–2012	Nike	None
2012–2013	NFC (In-House brand)	None
2013–2014	NFC (In-House brand)	Nassrawi.com (Note: To promote the club's website.)
2014–2017	NFC (In-House brand)	Mobily
2017–2018	New Balance	None
2018–2021	Victory (In-House brand)	Etihad Airways
2021–2022	Victory (In-House brand)	Lebara
2022–2023	Duneus	Shurfah
2023–2024	Nike	KAFD (Note: Owned by Public Investment Fund)
2024–2026	Adidas	KAFD
2026–present	Adidas	Humain

=== Kit deals ===
Kit supplier	Period	Total value	Ref.
Adidas	2024–2027	€27 million (€9 million per year)	

== Grounds ==
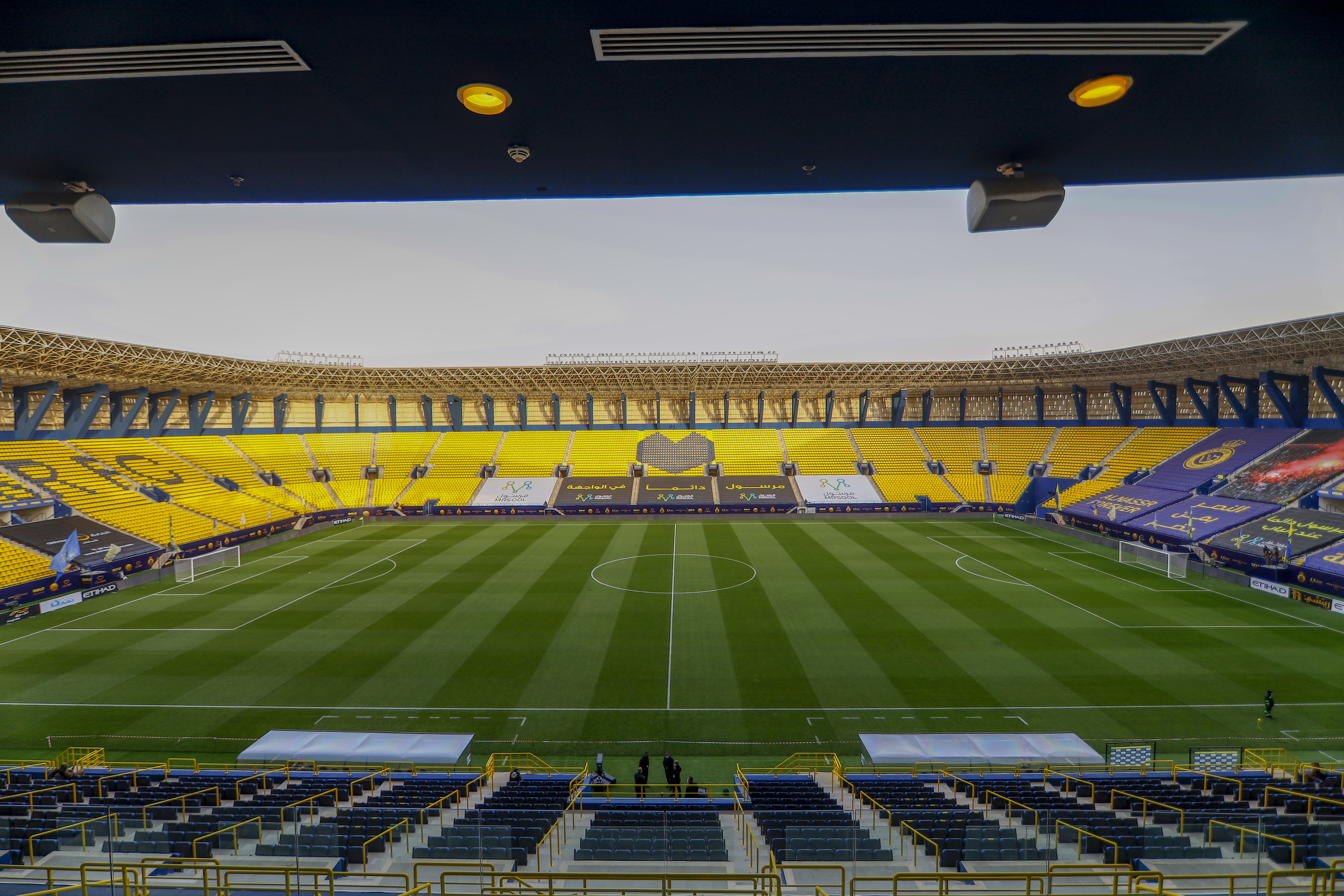
Interior view of King Saud University Stadium, which has served as a home ground of Al-Nassr since 2020

Throughout its history, Al-Nassr has played in many stadiums. From 1972 until 2020, the club's home stadium was Prince Faisal bin Fahd Sports City Stadium. From 1987 until 2020, the club alternated its home stadium with King Fahd Sports City Stadium. In 2020, Al-Nassr moved to King Saud University Stadium: this move stirred controversy, as the stadium had been the home of their rivals, Al-Hilal, between 2018 and 2020. Al-Nassr and Al-Hilal are expected to share the Prince Mohammed bin Salman Stadium upon its planned completion in 2029.

== Players ==
As of 6 September 2026

Note: Flags indicate national team as defined under FIFA eligibility rules; some limited exceptions apply. Players may hold more than one non-FIFA nationality.

No.	Pos.	Nation	Player
1	GK	KSA	Nawaf Al-Aqidi
2	DF	KSA	Sultan Al-Ghannam (vice-captain)
3	DF	FRA	Mohamed Simakan
4	DF	KSA	Nader Al-Sharari
5	DF	KSA	Abdulelah Al-Amri
6	DF	KSA	Saad Al-Nasser
7	FW	POR	Cristiano Ronaldo (captain)
8	MF	IRQ	Hayder Abdulkareem
9	FW	KSA	Abdullah Al-Hamdan
10	FW	SEN	Sadio Mané
11	MF	POR	Samú Costa
12	DF	KSA	Nawaf Boushal
14	MF	KSA	Sami Al-Najei
16	FW	KSA	Mohammed Maran
17	MF	KSA	Abdullah Al-Khaibari
20	MF	BRA	Ângelo Gabriel
21	FW	FRA	Kingsley Coman
22	GK	KSA	Abdulhadi Al-Alwan (on loan from Al-Fateh)

No.	Pos.	Nation	Player
23	MF	KSA	Ayman Yahya
24	GK	BRA	Bento
26	DF	ESP	Iñigo Martínez
29	MF	KSA	Abdulrahman Ghareeb
36	GK	KSA	Raghed Al-Najjar
40	DF	KSA	Youssef Al-Tahan
46	MF	TUN	Yassine Sallem
50	DF	KSA	Majed Qasheesh
53	GK	KSA	Abdulrahman Al-Otaibi
56	DF	KSA	Rakan Al-Ghamdi
60	FW	KSA	Saad Haqawi
61	GK	KSA	Mubarak Al-Buainain
66	GK	KSA	Sultan Almas
70	DF	KSA	Awad Aman
79	FW	POR	João Félix
83	DF	KSA	Salem Al-Najdi
88	MF	KSA	Bassam Hazazi
94	MF	KSA	Abdulrahaman Sufyani

=== Out on loan ===
Note: Flags indicate national team as defined under FIFA eligibility rules; some limited exceptions apply. Players may hold more than one non-FIFA nationality.

No.	Pos.	Nation	Player
18	MF	KSA	Abdulmalik Al-Jaber (at Al-Qadsiah)
77	FW	KSA	Haroune Camara (at Neom)

No.	Pos.	Nation	Player
80	FW	BRA	Wesley (at Cruzeiro)
—	FW	COL	Jhon Durán (at Benfica)

== Personnel ==
=== Current technical staff ===
Position	Name
Head coach	(Australia) Ange Postecoglou
Assistant coach	(England) Paul Nevin (Serbia) Aleksandar Rogić (Portugal) Ricardo Gomes da Silva
Goalkeeping coach	(Spain) Toni Mengual
Fitness coach	(Portugal) Carlos Bruno
Conditioning coach	(Portugal) Daniel Guerreiro
Video analyst	TBA
Technical coach	TBA
Head doctor	(Portugal) Carlos Miguel
Chief scout	TBA

- Information as of May 2026

=== Management ===
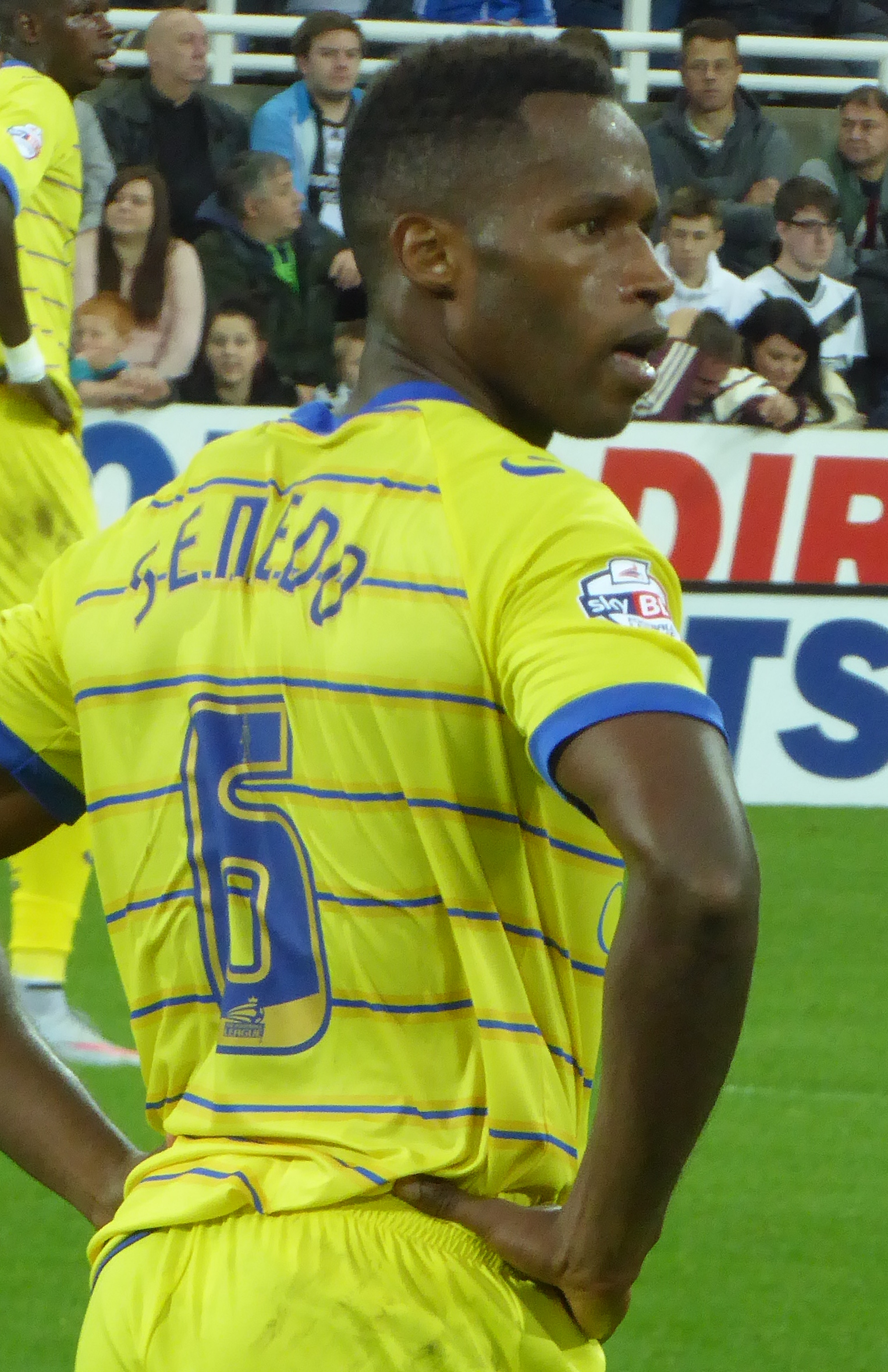
Portuguese former footballer José Semedo, who serves as the current acting CEO of Al-Nassr FC

Position	Name	Ref.
President	(Saudi Arabia) Abdullah Al-Majid	
Chief Executive Officer	(Portugal) José Semedo	
Sporting Director	(Portugal) Simão Coutinho	

- Information as of May 2026

== Honours ==
Al-Nassr Football Club has won a total of 30 competitive honours, making it one of the most successful clubs in Saudi Arabian football history. The club holds various domestic and international records and has consistently been a dominant force in the region.

The club made history by becoming the first Asian club to participate in the FIFA Club World Cup, competing in the inaugural edition of the tournament in 2000. On the continental level, the club has reached four Asian finals, winning two and finishing as runners-up in two.

Al-Nassr FC Honours
Type	Competition	Titles	Seasons
Domestic (SAFF)	Saudi Pro League	11	1973–74, 1974–75, 1979–80, 1980–81, 1988–89, 1993–94, 1994–95, 2013–14, 2014–15, 2018–19, 2025–26
Domestic (SAFF)	Saudi First Division League	1	1963–64
Domestic (SAFF)	King's Cup	5	1976, 1981, 1986, 1987, 1990
Domestic (SAFF)	Crown Prince Cup	3	1972–73, 1973–74, 2013–14
Domestic (SAFF)	Prince Faisal Cup/Saudi Federation Cup	3	1975–76, 1997–98, 2007–08
Domestic (SAFF)	Saudi Super Cup	2	2019, 2020
Continental (AFC)	Asian Cup Winners' Cup	1	1997–98
Continental (AFC)	Asian Super Cup	1	1998
Regional	Arab Club Champions Cup	1	2023
Regional	GCC Club Championship	2	1996, 1997

- record
- ^{s} shared record

=== Double ===
- 1980–81: Premier League and King Cup

== Records and statistics ==
=== League records ===
Season	Division	Tms.	Pos.	Pts
1974–75	Categorization League	16 (8)	1	21
1975–76	Cancelled	8	3	6
1976–77	Premier League	8	2	17
1977–78	Premier League	10	2	28
1978–79	Premier League	10	2	28
1979–80	Premier League	10	1	29
1980–81	Premier League	10	1	26
1981–82	Premier League	20 (10)	4	27
1982–83	Premier League	10	3	20
1983–84	Premier League	10	3	20
1984–85	Premier League	12	5	25
1985–86	Premier League	12 (6)	3	17
1986–87	Premier League	12	3	31
1987–88	Premier League	12	3	32
1988–89	Premier League	12	1	35
1989–90	Premier League	12	3	26
1990–91	Premier League	12	2	32
1991–92	Premier League	12	3	27
1992–93	Premier League	12	9	19
1993–94	Premier League	12	1	38
1994–95	Premier League	12	1	40
1995–96	Premier League	12	4	33
1996–97	Premier League	12	3	39
1997–98	Premier League	12	4	37
1998–99	Premier League	12	4	33
1999–00	Premier League	12	3	45
2000–01	Premier League	12	2	41
2001–02	Premier League	12	3	44
2002–03	Premier League	12	4	42
2003–04	Premier League	12	4	32
2004–05	Premier League	12	4	38
2005–06	Premier League	12	5	30
2006–07	Premier League	12	6	21
2007–08	Premier League	12	4	33
2008–09	Pro League	12	4	34
2009–10	Pro League	12	3	43
2010–11	Pro League	14	5	43
2011–12	Pro League	14	7	35
2012–13	Pro League	14	4	50
2013–14	Pro League	14	1	65
2014–15	Pro League	14	1	64
2015–16	Pro League	14	8	32
2016–17	Pro League	14	3	52
2017–18	Pro League	14	3	44
2018–19	Pro League	16	1	70
2019–20	Pro League	16	2	64
2020–21	Pro League	16	4	46
2021–22	Pro League	16	3	61
2022–23	Pro League	16	2	67
2023–24	Pro League	18	2	82
2024–25	Pro League	18	3	70
2025–26	Pro League	18	1	86

=== Top strikers in the league ===
As of 20 November 2026

#	Player	Nationality	Years	Goals
1	Majed Abdullah	Saudi Arabia	1977–1998	189
2	Cristiano Ronaldo	Portugal	2023–present	111
3	Mohammad Al-Sahlawi	Saudi Arabia	2009–2019	103
4	Abderrazak Hamdallah	Morocco	2018–2021	77
5	Talisca	Brazil	2021–2025	62
6	Sadio Mané	Senegal	2023–present	40
7	Saad Al-Harthi	Saudi Arabia	2004–2011	36
8	Hassan Al-Raheb	Saudi Arabia	2013–2018	26
9	João Félix	Portugal	2025–present	23
10	Yahya Al-Shehri	Saudi Arabia	2013–2018	19
10	Giuliano	Brazil	2018–2020	19
12	Adrian Mierzejewski	Poland	2014–2016	18

=== International records ===
Competition	Pld	W	D	L	GF	GA	GD	Win%
Arab Club Champions Cup	38	17	11	10	73	37	+36	44.74
Arab Cup Winners' Cup	13	7	4	2	19	7	+12	53.85
Arab Super Cup	3	1	2	0	5	3	+2	33.33
FIFA Club World Cup	3	1	0	2	5	8	−3	33.33
Total	57	26	17	14	102	55	+47	45.61

=== All–time top goalscorers ===
==== All competitions ====
As of 20 November 2026

	Player	Nationality	Years	Goals
1	Majed Abdullah	Saudi Arabia	1977–1998	259
2	Cristiano Ronaldo	Portugal	2023–present	139
3	Mohammad Al-Sahlawi	Saudi Arabia	2009–2019	131
4	Abderrazak Hamdallah	Morocco	2018–2021	115
5	Mohaisen Al-Jam'an	Saudi Arabia	1984–2000	110
6	Talisca	Brazil	2021–2025	77
7	Ohene Kennedy	Ghana	1993–1997	74
7	Fahd Al-Bishi	Saudi Arabia	1984–2000	74
9	Mohammad S. Abdeli	Saudi Arabia	1965–1980	73
10	Saad Al-Harthi	Saudi Arabia	2004–2011	71

== Record in Asian Football ==
Al-Nassr has reached five Asian finals, winning two titles and finishing as runners-up in three others, they claimed the Asian Cup Winners' Cup and the Asian Super Cup as champions, while finishing as runners-up in the Asian Cup Winners' Cup, the Asian Club Championship and the AFC Champions League Two.

As of 2 November 2026

Competition	Pld	W	D	L	GF	GA	GD	Win%
AFC Champions League Elite (Note: Founded in 1967 as the Asian Champion Club Tournament, later the Asian Club Championship, then the AFC Champions League, and finally the AFC Champions League Elite.)	86	45	20	21	149	96	+53	52.33
AFC Champions League Two	11	10	0	1	33	4	+29	90.91
Asian Cup Winners' Cup	14	10	2	2	19	17	+2	71.43
Asian Super Cup	2	0	2	0	1	1	+0	0.00
Total	113	65	24	24	202	118	+84	57.52

=== Top scorers in Asian competitions ===
As of 2 November 2026

#	Player	Nationality	Years	Goals
1	Abderrazak Hamdallah; Cristiano Ronaldo	Morocco; Portugal	2018–2021; 2023–present	16
3	Talisca	Brazil	2021–2025	11
4	Giuliano	Brazil	2018–2020	8
5	Fahd Al-Bishi; Sadio Mané	Saudi Arabia; Senegal	1984–2000; 2023–present	7
7	Abdulrahman Ghareeb; Kingsley Coman; João Félix	Saudi Arabia; France; Portugal	2022–present 2025–present 2025–present	6
10	Kennedy; Bader Al-Mutawa	Ghana; Kuwait	1993–1997; 2011	5

==== Matches ====
As of 2 November 2026

Season	Competition	Round	Club	Home	Away	Aggregate
1991–92	Asian Cup Winners' Cup	1R	(Lebanon) Al Ansar	2–1	2–1	4–2
1991–92	Asian Cup Winners' Cup	2R	(Yemen) Al Ahli	2–0	0–0	2–0
1991–92	Asian Cup Winners' Cup	QF	(Kuwait) Kazma	2–1	1–0	3–1
1991–92	Asian Cup Winners' Cup	SF	(Jordan) Al Ramtha	2–1	1–0	3–1
1991–92	Asian Cup Winners' Cup	Final	(Japan) Nissan	1–1	0–5	1–6
1995	Asian Club Championship	2R	(Kazakhstan) Yelimay Semipalatinsk	3–0 (Note: Yelimay Semipalatinsk withdrew after the 1st leg.)	1–0	4–0
1995	Asian Club Championship	QF	(Qatar) Al-Arabi	2–1		1st of 4
1995	Asian Club Championship	QF	(Iran) Saipa	0–0		1st of 4
1995	Asian Club Championship	QF	(Turkmenistan) Köpetdag Aşgabat	1–0		1st of 4
1995	Asian Club Championship	SF	(Thailand) Thai Farmers Bank	1–0		
1995	Asian Club Championship	Final	(South Korea) Ilhwa Chunma	0–1		
1996–97	Asian Club Championship	2R	(Lebanon) Nejmeh	4–0	0–1	4–1
1996–97	Asian Club Championship	QF	(Qatar) Al-Rayyan	1–2		3rd of 4
1996–97	Asian Club Championship	QF	(Iran) Persepolis	3–2		3rd of 4
1996–97	Asian Club Championship	QF	(Iraq) Al-Zawraa	0–0		3rd of 4
1997–98	Asian Cup Winners' Cup	QF	(Qatar) Al-Ittihad	0–0	3–2	3–2
1997–98	Asian Cup Winners' Cup	SF	(Turkmenistan) Köpetdag Aşgabat	2–1		
1997–98	Asian Cup Winners' Cup	Final	(South Korea) Suwon Samsung Bluewings	1–0		
1998	Asian Super Cup	Final	(South Korea) Pohang Steelers	0–0	1–1	1−1 (a)
1998–99	Asian Cup Winners' Cup	2R	(Kuwait) Kazma	2–1	0–3	2−4
2011	AFC Champions League	Group stage (Group B)	(Uzbekistan) Pakhtakor	4–0	2–2	2nd of 4
2011	AFC Champions League	Group stage (Group B)	(Iran) Esteghlal	2–1	1–2	2nd of 4
2011	AFC Champions League	Group stage (Group B)	(Qatar) Al-Sadd	1–1	0–1	2nd of 4
2011	AFC Champions League	R16	(Iran) Zob Ahan	1–4		
2015	AFC Champions League	Group stage (Group A)	(Uzbekistan) Bunyodkor	1–1	1–0	3rd of 4
2015	AFC Champions League	Group stage (Group A)	(Qatar) Lekhwiya	1–3	1–1	3rd of 4
2015	AFC Champions League	Group stage (Group A)	(Iran) Persepolis	3–0	0–1	3rd of 4
2016	AFC Champions League	Group stage (Group B)	(Uzbekistan) Bunyodkor	3–3	1–0	3rd of 4
2016	AFC Champions League	Group stage (Group B)	(Qatar) Lekhwiya	1–1	0–4	3rd of 4
2016	AFC Champions League	Group stage (Group B)	(Iran) Zob Ahan	0–3	0–3	3rd of 4
2019	AFC Champions League	PO	(Uzbekistan) AGMK	4–0		
2019	AFC Champions League	Group stage (Group A)	(United Arab Emirates) Al-Wasl	3–1	0–1	2nd of 4
2019	AFC Champions League	Group stage (Group A)	(Iran) Zob Ahan	2–3	0–0	2nd of 4
2019	AFC Champions League	Group stage (Group A)	(Iraq) Al-Zawraa	4–1	2–1	2nd of 4
2019	AFC Champions League	R16	(United Arab Emirates) Al-Wahda	1–1	3–2	4–3
2019	AFC Champions League	QF	(Qatar) Al-Sadd	2–1	1–3	3–4
2020	AFC Champions League	Group stage (Group D)	(Qatar) Al-Sadd	2–2	1–1	1st of 4
2020	AFC Champions League	Group stage (Group D)	(United Arab Emirates) Al-Ain	0–1	2–1	1st of 4
2020	AFC Champions League	Group stage (Group D)	(Iran) Sepahan	2–0	2–0	1st of 4
2020	AFC Champions League	R16	(Saudi Arabia) Al-Taawoun	1–0		
2020	AFC Champions League	QF	(Saudi Arabia) Al-Ahli	2–0		
2020	AFC Champions League	SF	(Iran) Persepolis	1–1 (3–5 p)		
2021	AFC Champions League	Group stage (Group D)	(Jordan) Al-Wehdat	1–2	0–0	1st of 4
2021	AFC Champions League	Group stage (Group D)	(Qatar) Al-Sadd	3–1	2–1	1st of 4
2021	AFC Champions League	Group stage (Group D)	(Iran) Foolad	2–0	1–1	1st of 4
2021	AFC Champions League	R16	(Iran) Tractor	1–0		
2021	AFC Champions League	QF	(United Arab Emirates) Al-Wahda	5–1		
2021	AFC Champions League	SF	(Saudi Arabia) Al-Hilal	1–2		
2023–24	AFC Champions League	PO	(United Arab Emirates) Shabab Al-Ahli	4–2 (H)		
2023–24	AFC Champions League	Group stage (Group E)	(Iran) Persepolis	0–0	2–0	1st of 4
2023–24	AFC Champions League	Group stage (Group E)	(Tajikistan) Istiklol	3–1	1–1	1st of 4
2023–24	AFC Champions League	Group stage (Group E)	(Qatar) Al-Duhail	4–3	3–2	1st of 4
2023–24	AFC Champions League	R16	(Saudi Arabia) Al-Fayha	2–0	1–0	3–0
2023–24	AFC Champions League	QF	(United Arab Emirates) Al-Ain	4–3	0–1	4–4 (1–3 p)
2024–25	AFC Champions League Elite	League stage	(Iraq) Al-Shorta	1–1 (A)		3rd of 12
2024–25	AFC Champions League Elite	League stage	(Qatar) Al-Rayyan	2–1 (H)		3rd of 12
2024–25	AFC Champions League Elite	League stage	(Iran) Esteghlal	1–0 (A)		3rd of 12
2024–25	AFC Champions League Elite	League stage	(United Arab Emirates) Al-Ain	5–1 (H)		3rd of 12
2024–25	AFC Champions League Elite	League stage	(Qatar) Al-Gharafa	3–1 (A)		3rd of 12
2024–25	AFC Champions League Elite	League stage	(Qatar) Al-Sadd	1–2 (H)		3rd of 12
2024–25	AFC Champions League Elite	League stage	(United Arab Emirates) Al-Wasl	4–0 (H)		3rd of 12
2024–25	AFC Champions League Elite	League stage	(Iran) Persepolis	0–0 (A)		3rd of 12
2024–25	AFC Champions League Elite	R16	(Iran) Esteghlal	3–0	0–0	3–0
2024–25	AFC Champions League Elite	QF	(Japan) Yokohama F. Marinos	4–1 (N)		
2024–25	AFC Champions League Elite	SF	(Japan) Kawasaki Frontale	2–3 (N)		
2025–26	AFC Champions League Two	Group stage (Group D)	(Tajikistan) Istiklol	5–0	4–0	1st of 4
2025–26	AFC Champions League Two	Group stage (Group D)	(Iraq) Al-Zawraa	5–1	2–0	1st of 4
2025–26	AFC Champions League Two	Group stage (Group D)	(India) Goa	4–0	2–1	1st of 4
2025–26	AFC Champions League Two	R16	(Turkmenistan) Arkadag	1–0	1–0	2–0
2025–26	AFC Champions League Two	QF	(United Arab Emirates) Al-Wasl	4–0 (A)		
2025–26	AFC Champions League Two	SF	(Qatar) Al Ahli	5–1 (N)		
2025–26	AFC Champions League Two	Final	(Japan) Gamba Osaka	0–1 (H)		
2026–27	AFC Champions League Elite	League stage	(United Arab Emirates) Al Ain	0–4 (A)		TBD
2026–27	AFC Champions League Elite	League stage	(Uzbekistan) Neftchi	3–1 (H)		TBD
2026–27	AFC Champions League Elite	League stage	(United Arab Emirates) Al Wasl	(H)		TBD
2026–27	AFC Champions League Elite	League stage	(Uzbekistan) Pakhtakor	6–2 (A)		TBD
2026–27	AFC Champions League Elite	League stage	(Qatar) Al-Sadd	(H)		TBD
2026–27	AFC Champions League Elite	League stage	(Qatar) Al-Gharafa	(A)		TBD
2026–27	AFC Champions League Elite	League stage	(Qatar) Al-Shamal	(H)		TBD
2026–27	AFC Champions League Elite	League stage	(United Arab Emirates) Shabab Al Ahli	(A)		TBD

Key: PO – Play-off round; 1R/2R – First/Second round; R16 – Round of 16; QF – Quarter-final; SF – Semi-final; H – Home game; A – Away game; N – Neutral venue game

Colour key:

Wins
Draws
Losses
Finals won
Finals lost

== Notable players ==
Saudi Arabia (SAFF)	Asia (AFC)	Africa (CAF)	Europe (UEFA)	South America (CONMEBOL)
(Saudi Arabia) Majed Abdullah; (Saudi Arabia) Mohammad S. Abdeli; (Saudi Arabia) Hussein Abdulghani; (Saudi Arabia) Fahad Al-Bishi; (Saudi Arabia) Mohammad Al-Sahlawi; (Saudi Arabia) Abdullah Madu; (Saudi Arabia) Sultan Al-Ghannam; (Saudi Arabia) Yahya Al-Shehri; (Saudi Arabia) Omar Hawsawi; (Saudi Arabia) Saeed Ghorab	(Iraq) Nashat Akram; (Kuwait) Bader Al-Mutawa; (Oman) Amad Al-Hosni; (South Korea) Kim Jin-su; (Bahrain) Mohammed Husain	(Ghana) Ohene Kennedy; (Ivory Coast) Seko Fofana; (Ivory Coast) Ghislain Konan; (Morocco) Nordin Amrabat; (Morocco) Abderrazak Hamdallah; (Nigeria) Ahmed Musa; (Senegal) Sadio Mané	(Albania) Hysen Zmijani; (Bulgaria) Hristo Stoichkov; (Croatia) Marcelo Brozović; (France) Kingsley Coman; (France) Mohamed Simakan; (Greece) Angelos Charisteas; (Poland) Adrian Mierzejewski; (Portugal) Cristiano Ronaldo; (Portugal) Otávio; (Portugal) João Félix; (Spain) Álvaro González; (Spain) Aymeric Laporte; (Spain) Iñigo Martínez	(Argentina) Pity Martínez; (Bolivia) Julio César Baldivieso; (Brazil) Alex Telles; (Brazil) Talisca; (Brazil) Bruno Uvini; (Brazil) Petros; (Brazil) Ângelo Gabriel; (Brazil) Bento; (Brazil) Wesley; (Brazil) Luiz Gustavo; (Brazil) Toninho; (Brazil) Denílson; (Colombia) Jhon Durán; (Colombia) David Ospina; (Uruguay) Fabián Estoyanoff

== See also ==
- List of football clubs in Saudi Arabia

== Notes ==
Preceded by Al Hilal	Asian Cup Winners' Cup; 1998	Succeeded by Al-Ittihad
Preceded by Al Hilal	Asian Super Cup; 1998	Succeeded by Júbilo Iwata
Preceded by Kazma	Gulf Club Champions Cup; 1996, 1997	Succeeded by Al Hilal
