= 2013–14 Melbourne Victory FC season =

Melbourne Victory
2013–14 season
- Chairman: Anthony Di Pietro
- Manager: Ange Postecoglou (until 31 October 2013); Kevin Muscat (from 31 October 2013)
- Stadium: Etihad Stadium, AAMI Park
- A-League: 4th
- A-League Finals series: Semi-finals
- AFC Champions League: Group stage
- Top goalscorer: James Troisi (12)
Home colours	Away colours

The 2013–14 Melbourne Victory season is the ninth A-League season for the club.

== History ==
The 2013–14 season was Melbourne Victory's ninth season in the A-League. On Monday 13 May 2013, Melbourne Victory announced their first signing of the season by signing Brisbane Roar Mitch Nichols on a two-year deal, reuniting him with his former Roar manager Ange Postecoglou. He became Postecoglou's first new signing ahead of the 2013/14 A-League season. On 9 June it was speculated that Melbourne Victory was the prime club looking to sign Greece national team captain, Giorgos Karagounis, after it was confirmed he was to be released by Premier League club Fulham. After it was confirmed the Karagounis talks had come to a halt, Fulham then had second thoughts about the release and decided to pursue Karagounis' signature, which in the end they did. Argentine Marque player Marcos Flores was released with mutual consent on 5 July. Following Flores' departure to Central Coast Mariners, Victory attempted to sign Italian international Fabrizio Miccoli as their marquee player however he signed with Lecce. Following these two disappointments for the Melbourne Victory stakeholders, the victory hosted one of the most notable sporting events in Australian Sporting history. This event was a Melbourne Victory against Liverpool at the MCG in front of 95,446 spectators. The full Liverpool squad was brought to Melbourne, including stars such as Steven Gerrard, Luis Suárez, Kolo Touré, Simon Mignolet, and Brad Jones. Melbourne lost the game 0–2 in what was considered a 'thriller', and has since sparked rumours of the development of a sister club relationship. Following the Liverpool match, Kosta Barbarouses was signed on a 3-year deal. On 17 September, Adrian Leijer handed over the captaincy role to Mark Milligan. On 23 October 2013, it was revealed that Ange Postecoglou will coach the Socceroos and it was rumoured that Kevin Muscat would take over as coach of Melbourne Victory. On 31 October 2013, Muscat was officially appointed as Melbourne Victory's coach.

== Players ==
=== Senior squad ===
As of 21 January 2014.
Note: Flags indicate national team as defined under FIFA eligibility rules; some limited exceptions apply. Players may hold more than one non-FIFA nationality.

No.	Pos.	Nation	Player
1	GK	AUS	Nathan Coe
2	DF	CHI	Pablo Contreras
3	DF	CIV	Adama Traoré
4	DF	AUS	Nick Ansell
5	MF	AUS	Mark Milligan (Captain)
6	MF	AUS	Leigh Broxham (Vice-Captain)
7	MF	BRA	Guilherme Finkler
9	FW	NZL	Kosta Barbarouses
10	FW	AUS	Archie Thompson
11	FW	AUS	Connor Pain
13	FW	AUS	Andrew Nabbout
14	MF	AUS	James Troisi (On loan from Atalanta)

No.	Pos.	Nation	Player
16	MF	AUS	Rashid Mahazi
17	MF	AUS	James Jeggo
18	MF	AUS	Francesco Stella
20	GK	AUS	Lawrence Thomas
21	MF	AUS	Tom Rogić (On loan from Celtic)
22	FW	AUS	Jesse Makarounas
23	DF	AUS	Adrian Leijer (2nd Vice-Captain)
24	DF	AUS	Scott Galloway
25	DF	AUS	Jason Geria
26	MF	AUS	Jordan Brown
27	MF	AUS	Christopher Cristaldo
31	DF	AUS	Dylan Murnane

== Transfers ==
=== Winter ===
==== In ====
Note: Flags indicate national team as defined under FIFA eligibility rules; some limited exceptions apply. Players may hold more than one non-FIFA nationality.

No.	Pos.	Nation	Player
15	MF	AUS	Mitch Nichols (Free transfer from (Australia) Brisbane Roar)
9	FW	NZL	Kosta Barbarouses (Free transfer from (Russia) Alania Vladikavkaz)
2	DF	CHI	Pablo Contreras (Free transfer from (Greece) Olympiacos)
14	FW	AUS	James Troisi (Loan from (Italy) Atalanta)
16	MF	AUS	Rashid Mahazi (Free transfer from (Australia) Northcote City)

==== Out ====
Note: Flags indicate national team as defined under FIFA eligibility rules; some limited exceptions apply. Players may hold more than one non-FIFA nationality.

No.	Pos.	Nation	Player
1	GK	AUS	Tando Velaphi (Released)
2	DF	AUS	Matthew Foschini (Free transfer to (India) Salgaocar)
9	MF	ARG	Marcos Flores (Free transfer to (Australia) Central Coast Mariners)
11	FW	NZL	Marco Rojas (Free transfer to (Germany) VfB Stuttgart)
13	DF	AUS	Diogo Ferreira
14	MF	AUS	Billy Celeski (Transfer to (United Arab Emirates) Al Shaab)
15	DF	AUS	Sam Gallagher (Released)
16	FW	AUS	Theo Markelis (Released)
21	DF	AUS	Spase Dilevski (Released)
25	MF	AUS	Luke O'Dea (Transfer to (Australia) Melbourne Heart Youth)
33	DF	AUS	Daniel Mullen (Loan return to (China) Dalian Aerbin)

=== Summer ===
==== In ====
Note: Flags indicate national team as defined under FIFA eligibility rules; some limited exceptions apply. Players may hold more than one non-FIFA nationality.

No.	Pos.	Nation	Player
21	MF	AUS	Tom Rogić (Loan from (Scotland) Celtic)

==== Out ====
Note: Flags indicate national team as defined under FIFA eligibility rules; some limited exceptions apply. Players may hold more than one non-FIFA nationality.

No.	Pos.	Nation	Player
8	MF	MRI	Jonathan Bru (Released)
15	MF	AUS	Mitch Nichols (To (Japan) Cerezo Osaka)

== Competitions ==
=== Overall ===
Competition	Started round	Current position / round	Final position / round	First match	Last match
A-League	—	—	4th	12 October 2013	12 April 2014
AFC Champions League	Qualifying play-off	—	Group stage	15 February 2014	22 April 2014
National Youth League	—	—	3rd	26 October 2013	1 March 2014

=== Pre-season ===
2 July 2013	Richmond SC (Australia)	1–2	(Australia) Melbourne Victory	Melbourne
	Armenian 9'	Report	J. Jeggo 25'; Nabbout 35'	Stadium: Kevin Bartlett Reserve

9 July 2013	Bentleigh Greens (Australia)	1–1	(Australia) Melbourne Victory	Melbourne
	Milovanović 24'	Report	Nabbout 76'	Stadium: Kingston Heath Soccer Complex

16 July 2013	Port Melbourne Sharks (Australia)	0–1	(Australia) Melbourne Victory	Melbourne
		Report	Geria 22'	Stadium: SS Anderson Reserve

24 July 2013	Melbourne Victory (Australia)	0–2	(England) Liverpool	Melbourne
		Report	Gerrard 36'; Aspas 90+3'	Stadium: MCG; Attendance: 95,446

8 September 2013	Hume City (Australia)	0–3	(Australia) Melbourne Victory	Melbourne
Sunday 14:00		Report	Makarounas 11'; Stella 50'; Cristaldo 85'	Stadium: Broadmeadows Valley Park

14 September 2013	Brisbane Roar	1–0	Melbourne Victory	Ipswich
Saturday 15:15	Yeboah 83'	Report		Stadium: Qld Group Stadium; Attendance: 2,542; Referee: Alan Milliner

18 September 2013	Melbourne Victory	0–1	Newcastle Jets	Melbourne
Wednesday 14:00		Report	Virgili 49' (pen.)	Stadium: AAMI Park; Referee: Lucien Laverdure

29 September 2013	Tasmania XI (Australia)	1–6	(Australia) Melbourne Victory	Kingston
Sunday 12:00	Brassington 11'	Report	Finkler 8', 28', 39'; Proia 36', 60'; Duzel 90'	Stadium: Twin Ovals

29 September 2013	Melbourne Victory	3–0	Western Sydney Wanderers	Kingston
Sunday 14:30	Nichols 1'; Barbarouses 27'; Čović 76' (o.g.)	Report		Stadium: Twin Ovals; Attendance: 5,290

3 October 2013	Melbourne Victory	1–2	Adelaide United	Melbourne
Thursday 15:30	Barbarouses 83'	Report	Neumann 23'; Elrich 72'	Stadium: AAMI Park; Attendance: Closed to the public Referee: Shaun Evans

=== A-League ===
==== Matches ====
12 October 2013 1	Melbourne Victory	0–0	Melbourne Heart	Melbourne
Saturday 19:45		Report		Stadium: Etihad Stadium; Attendance: 45,202; Referee: Peter Green

18 October 2013 2	Adelaide United	2–2	Melbourne Victory	Adelaide
Friday 19:30	Cirio 21' (pen.); Jerónimo 25'	Report	Finkler 79'; Troisi 90+3'	Stadium: Coopers Stadium; Attendance: 16,504; Referee: Alan Milliner

25 October 2013 3	Melbourne Victory	1–0	Brisbane Roar	Melbourne
Friday 19:30	Troisi 56'	Report		Stadium: Etihad Stadium; Attendance: 21,693; Referee: Ben Williams

4 November 2013 4	Melbourne Victory	3–2	Wellington Phoenix	Melbourne
Monday 19:30	A. Thompson 9'; Troisi 22', 31'	Report	Brockie 37'; Ifill 85'	Stadium: Etihad Stadium; Attendance: 23,226; Referee: Matthew Gillett

9 November 2013 5	Sydney FC	3–2	Melbourne Victory	Sydney
Saturday 19:30	Garcia 3'; Ryall 15'; Del Piero 37' (pen.)	Report	A. Thompson 17'; Troisi 27'	Stadium: Allianz Stadium; Attendance: 18,784; Referee: Peter Green

16 November 2013 6	Western Sydney Wanderers	1–0	Melbourne Victory	Sydney
Saturday 19:45	Bridge 82'	Report		Stadium: Pirtek Stadium; Attendance: 15,854; Referee: Kris Griffiths-Jones

23 November 2013 7	Melbourne Victory	3–0	Adelaide United	Melbourne
Saturday 19:45	Barbarouses 14'; A. Thompson 68'; Nichols 76'	Report		Stadium: Etihad Stadium; Attendance: 20,064; Referee: Ben Williams

29 November 2013 8	Central Coast Mariners	0–0	Melbourne Victory	Gosford
Friday 19:30		Report		Stadium: Bluetongue Stadium; Attendance: 5,787; Referee: Kris Griffiths-Jones

8 December 2013 9	Melbourne Victory	1–2	Newcastle Jets	Melbourne
Sunday 17:00	Troisi 50'	Report	N. Burns 44', 66'	Stadium: AAMI Park; Attendance: 18,113; Referee: Alan Milliner

13 December 2013 10	Melbourne Victory	2–0	Perth Glory	Melbourne
Friday 19:30	Traoré 36'; Finkler 90'	Report		Stadium: AAMI Park; Attendance: 17,008; Referee: Peter Green

21 December 2013 11	Melbourne Heart	1–3	Melbourne Victory	Melbourne
Saturday 19:30	Kalmar 81'	Report	Nichols 38', 63'; Troisi 60'	Stadium: AAMI Park; Attendance: 26,491; Referee: Ben Williams

28 December 2013 12	Melbourne Victory	1–1	Western Sydney Wanderers	Melbourne
Saturday 19:30	Finkler 90+4'	Report	Šantalab 71'	Stadium: AAMI Park; Attendance: 22,133; Referee: Peter Green

4 January 2014 13	Melbourne Victory	0–3	Brisbane Roar	Melbourne
Saturday 19:30		Report	Miller 28'; McKay 56'; Petratos 67'	Stadium: AAMI Park; Attendance: 23,121; Referee: Kris Griffiths-Jones

10 January 2014 14	Newcastle Jets	1–1	Melbourne Victory	Newcastle
Friday 19:30	Nichols 42' (o.g.)	Report	Nabbout 49'	Stadium: Hunter Stadium; Attendance: 12,270; Referee: Strebre Delovski

18 January 2014 15	Wellington Phoenix	5–0	Melbourne Victory	Wellington
Saturday 17:30	Hernández 21', 45+2' (pen.); Cunningham 45+1'; Brockie 85'; Huysegems 87'	Report		Stadium: Westpac Stadium; Attendance: 6,813; Referee: Adam Kersey

26 January 2014 16	Melbourne Victory	0–5	Sydney FC	Melbourne
Sunday 17:00		Report	Despotović 11'; Del Piero 20' (pen.), 54'; Ryall 25'; Carle 87'	Stadium: Etihad Stadium; Attendance: 24,354; Referee: Ben Williams

31 January 2014 17	Perth Glory	1–1	Melbourne Victory	Perth
Friday 21:45	Šernas 50'	Report	Finkler 37' (pen.)	Stadium: nib Stadium; Attendance: 10,151; Referee: Kris Griffiths-Jones

8 February 2014 18	Central Coast Mariners	1–3	Melbourne Victory	Gosford
Saturday 17:30	Ibini 11'	Report	Troisi 45+1', 62'; A. Thompson 50'	Stadium: Central Coast Stadium; Attendance: 9,138; Referee: Matthew Gillett

14 January 2014; Rescheduled 19	Melbourne Victory	3–1	Western Sydney Wanderers	Melbourne
Tuesday 19:30	A. Thompson 52'; Barbarouses 62'; Finkler 90+5'	Report	Juric 90+4'	Stadium: AAMI Park; Attendance: 14,774; Referee: Ben Williams

22 February 2014 20	Melbourne Victory	4–3	Adelaide United	Melbourne
Saturday 19:30	Finkler 15', 56'; A. Thompson 66'; Barbarouses 75'	Report	Cirio 3', 45', 83'	Stadium: AAMI Park; Attendance: 18,341; Referee: Kris Griffiths-Jones

1 March 2014 21	Melbourne Heart	4–0	Melbourne Victory	Melbourne
Saturday 19:30	Engelaar 9'; Dugandžić 15'; Williams 83'; Kewell 86'	Report		Stadium: AAMI Park; Attendance: 25,546; Referee: Strebre Delovski

7 March 2014 22	Melbourne Victory	3–1	Central Coast Mariners	Melbourne
Friday 19:30	J. Jeggo 31'; Troisi 77' (pen.); Barbarouses 90+2'	Report	Anderson 63'	Stadium: AAMI Park; Attendance: 15,031; Referee: Ben Williams

15 March 2014 23	Perth Glory	1–2	Melbourne Victory	Perth
Saturday 22:15	Milligan 27' (o.g.)	Report	Milligan 40' (pen.); A. Thompson 90'	Stadium: nib Stadium; Attendance: 7,068; Referee: Shaun Evans

22 March 2014 24	Brisbane Roar	1–0	Melbourne Victory	Brisbane
Saturday 19:30	Brattan 90+2'	Report		Stadium: Suncorp Stadium; Attendance: 17,965; Referee: Peter Green

29 March 2014 25	Melbourne Victory	1–1	Sydney FC	Melbourne
Saturday 19:30	Troisi 64'	Report	Chianese 48'	Stadium: AAMI Park; Attendance: 20,447; Referee: Jarred Gillett

5 April 2014 26	Newcastle Jets	2–2	Melbourne Victory	Newcastle
Saturday 17:30	Taggart 18'; Leijer 23' (o.g.)	Report	Milligan 21', 85' (pen.)	Stadium: Hunter Stadium; Attendance: 10,185; Referee: Strebre Delovski

12 April 2014 27	Wellington Phoenix	1–4	Melbourne Victory	Wellington
Saturday 15:30	Brockie 90'	Report	Thompson 1'; Troisi 29'; Finkler 45'; Milligan 59' (pen.)	Stadium: Westpac Stadium; Attendance: 5,336; Referee: Chris Beath

==== League table ====
Pos	Team	Pld	W	D	L	GF	GA	GD	Pts	Qualification
1	Brisbane Roar (C)	27	16	4	7	43	25	+18	52	Qualificaition for 2015 AFC Champions League group stage and finals series
2	Western Sydney Wanderers	27	11	9	7	34	29	+5	42	Qualificaition for 2015 AFC Champions League group stage and finals series
3	Central Coast Mariners	27	12	6	9	33	36	−3	42	Qualification for 2015 AFC Champions League qualifying play-off and finals series (Note: Since the winner of 2014 A-League Grand Final (Brisbane Roar) qualified for the 2015 AFC Champions League group stage, the 2nd and 3rd placed teams qualified for the group stage and the qualifying play-off of 2015 AFC Champions League.)
4	Melbourne Victory	27	11	8	8	42	43	−1	41	Qualification for Finals series
5	Sydney FC	27	12	3	12	40	38	+2	39	Qualification for Finals series
6	Adelaide United	27	10	8	9	45	36	+9	38	Qualification for Finals series
7	Newcastle Jets	27	10	6	11	34	34	0	36	
8	Perth Glory	27	7	7	13	28	37	−9	28	
9	Wellington Phoenix (Note: Wellington Phoenix cannot qualify for the AFC Champions League as they are not recognised as an AFC club.)	27	7	7	13	36	51	−15	28	
10	Melbourne Heart	27	6	8	13	36	42	−6	26	

Updated to match(es) played on 13 April 2014. Source: ultimatealeague.com
Rules for classification: 1) points; 2) goal difference; 3) number of goals scored.
(C) Champions

==== Results summary ====
Overall								Home						Away					
Pld	W	D	L	GF	GA	GD	Pts	W	D	L	GF	GA	GD	W	D	L	GF	GA	GD
27	11	8	8	42	43	−1	41	7	3	3	22	19	+3	4	5	5	20	24	−4

Last updated: 13 April 2014.
Source: Competitive Matches

==== Results by round ====
Round	1	2	3	4	5	6	7	8	9	10	11	12	13	14	15	16	17	18	19	20	21	22	23	24	25	26	27
Ground	H	A	H	H	A	A	H	A	H	H	A	H	H	A	A	H	A	A	H	H	A	H	A	A	H	A	A
Result	D	D	W	W	L	L	W	D	L	W	W	D	L	D	L	L	D	W	W	W	L	W	W	L	D	D	W
Position	6	5	4	3	3	6	5	4	6	4	3	3	4	4	4	4	4	4	3\4 (Note: Round 19 was played early (between rounds 14 and 15) due to clash with ACL games. The first position (3) is after the round 19 match. The second position (4) is after the rest of round 19 matches.)	3	5	3	2	3	5	5	4

Updated to match(es) played on 13 April 2014. Source: Matches
A = Away; H = Home; W = Win; D = Draw; L = Loss

==== League Goalscorers per Round ====
Total	Player		Goals per Round																										
Total	Player		1	2	3	4	5	6	7	8	9	10	11	12	13	14	15	16	17	18	19	20	21	22	23	24	25	26	27
12	(Australia)	James Troisi		1	1	2	1				1		1							2				1			1		1
8	(Australia)	Archie Thompson				1	1		1											1	1	1			1				1
8	(Brazil)	Guilherme Finkler		1								1		1					1		1	2							1
4	(New Zealand)	Kosta Barbarouses							1												1	1		1					
4	(Australia)	Mark Milligan																							1			2	1
3	(Australia)	Mitch Nichols							1				2																
1	(Ivory Coast)	Adama Traoré										1																	
1	(Australia)	Andrew Nabbout														1													
1	(Australia)	James Jeggo																						1					
42	TOTAL		0	2	1	3	2	0	3	0	1	2	3	1	0	1	0	0	1	3	3	4	0	3	2	0	1	2	4

=== AFC Champions League ===
==== Qualifying play-off ====
15 February 2014 1	Melbourne Victory (Australia)	2–1	(Thailand) Muangthong United	Geelong, Australia
Saturday 19:45 AEDT	Troisi 58'; Broxham 83'	Report	Gjurovski 22'; Thonglao (red card) 90+4'	Stadium: Kardinia Park; Attendance: 8,304; Referee: Masaaki Toma (Japan)

==== Group stage ====
Pos	Team	Pld	W	D	L	GF	GA	GD	Pts	Qualification	GUA	JEO	MEL	YFM
1	(China) Guangzhou Evergrande	6	3	1	2	10	8	+2	10	Advance to knockout stage	—	3–1	4–2	2–1
2	(South Korea) Jeonbuk Hyundai Motors	6	2	2	2	8	7	+1	8	Advance to knockout stage	1–0	—	0–0	3–0
3	(Australia) Melbourne Victory	6	2	2	2	9	9	0	8		2–0	2–2	—	1–0
4	(Japan) Yokohama F. Marinos	6	2	1	3	7	10	−3	7		1–1	2–1	3–2	—

26 February 2014 1	Guangzhou Evergrande (China)	4–2	(Australia) Melbourne Victory	Guangzhou, China
Wednesday 20:00 CST	Huang B W 59'; Diamanti 65', 85'; Elkeson 71'	Report	Contreras 36'; Broxham 41'	Stadium: Tianhe Stadium; Attendance: 39,841; Referee: Abdulrahman Abdou (Qatar)

12 March 2014 2	Melbourne Victory (Australia)	2–2	(South Korea) Jeonbuk Hyundai Motors	Melbourne, Australia
Wednesday 19:30 AEDT	Ansell 31'; Barbarouses 81'	Report	Lee Dong-Gook 76', 79'	Stadium: Docklands Stadium; Attendance: 6,128; Referee: Mohamed Al Zarouni (United Arab Emirates)

18 March 2014 3	Melbourne Victory (Australia)	1–0	(Japan) Yokohama F. Marinos	Melbourne, Australia
Tuesday 19:30 AEDT	Barbarouses 9'	Report		Stadium: Melbourne Rectangular Stadium; Attendance: 6,357; Referee: Mohd Amirul Izwan Bin Yaacob (Malaysia)

2 April 2014 4	Yokohama F. Marinos (Japan)	3–2	(Australia) Melbourne Victory	Yokohama, Japan
Wednesday 19:30 JST	Ito 21'; Nakamachi 27'; Hyodo 89'	Report	Troisi 7' (pen.); J. Jeggo 90+2'	Stadium: International Stadium Yokohama; Attendance: 7,395; Referee: Liu Kwok Man (Hong Kong)

15 April 2014 5	Melbourne Victory (Australia)	2–0	(China) Guangzhou Evergrande	Melbourne, Australia
Tuesday 19:30 AEST	Milligan 2'; Troisi 90+1'	Report		Stadium: Docklands Stadium; Attendance: 13,120; Referee: Fahad Al-Mirdasi (Saudi Arabia)

22 April 2014 6	Jeonbuk Hyundai Motors (South Korea)	0–0	(Australia) Melbourne Victory	Jeonju, South Korea
Tuesday 19:00 KST		Report		Stadium: Jeonju World Cup Stadium; Attendance: 12,891; Referee: Nawaf Shukralla (Bahrain)

==== Goalscorers ====
3 goals

- (Australia) James Troisi

2 goals

- (New Zealand) Kosta Barbarouses
- (Australia) Leigh Broxham

1 goal

- (Australia) Nick Ansell
- (Chile) Pablo Contreras
- (Australia) James Jeggo
- (Australia) Mark Milligan

== Awards ==
- Player of the Week (Round 25) – Mark Milligan
