= 2014 AFC Champions League group stage =

The group stage of the 2014 AFC Champions League was played from 25 February to 23 April 2014. A total of 32 teams competed in the group stage.

== Draw ==
The draw for the group stage was held on 10 December 2013, 16:00 UTC+8, at the AFC House in Kuala Lumpur, Malaysia. The 32 teams were drawn into eight groups of four. Teams from the same association could not be drawn into the same group.

The following 32 teams (16 from West Zone, 16 from East Zone) were entered into the group-stage draw, which included the 28 automatic qualifiers and the four qualifying play-off winners, whose identity was not known at the time of the draw:

Zone	Teams
West Zone (Groups A–D)	(Iran) Esteghlal; (Iran) Sepahan; (Iran) Tractor Sazi; (Iran) Foolad; (Saudi Arabia) Al-Fateh; (Saudi Arabia) Al-Ittihad; (Saudi Arabia) Al-Hilal; (Saudi Arabia) Al-Shabab; (United Arab Emirates) Al-Ain; (United Arab Emirates) Al-Ahli; (United Arab Emirates) Al-Jazira; (Qatar) Al-Sadd; (Qatar) Al-Rayyan; (Uzbekistan) Bunyodkor; Winner of play-off West 1: (Qatar) El Jaish; Winner of play-off West 2: (Qatar) Lekhwiya
East Zone (Groups E–H)	(Japan) Sanfrecce Hiroshima; (Japan) Yokohama F. Marinos; (Japan) Kawasaki Frontale; (Japan) Cerezo Osaka; (South Korea) Pohang Steelers; (South Korea) Ulsan Hyundai; (South Korea) Jeonbuk Hyundai Motors; (South Korea) FC Seoul; (China) Guangzhou Evergrande; (China) Guizhou Renhe; (China) Shandong Luneng Taishan; (Australia) Western Sydney Wanderers; (Australia) Central Coast Mariners; (Thailand) Buriram United; Winner of play-off East 1: (China) Beijing Guoan; Winner of play-off East 2: (Australia) Melbourne Victory

== Format ==
In the group stage, each group was played on a home-and-away round-robin basis. The winners and runners-up of each group advanced to the round of 16.

=== Tiebreakers ===
The teams are ranked according to points (3 points for a win, 1 point for a draw, 0 points for a loss). If tied on points, tiebreakers are applied in the following order:

1. Greater number of points obtained in the group matches between the teams concerned
2. Goal difference resulting from the group matches between the teams concerned
3. Greater number of goals scored in the group matches between the teams concerned (away goals do not apply)
4. Goal difference in all the group matches
5. Greater number of goals scored in all the group matches
6. Penalty shoot-out if only two teams are involved and they are both on the field of play
7. Fewer score calculated according to the number of yellow and red cards received in the group matches (1 point for a single yellow card, 3 points for a red card as a consequence of two yellow cards, 3 points for a direct red card, 4 points for a yellow card followed by a direct red card)
8. Drawing of lots

== Groups ==
The matchdays were 25–26 February, 11–12 March, 18–19 March, 1–2 April, 15–16 April, and 22–23 April 2014.

=== Group A ===
Pos	Team	Pld	W	D	L	GF	GA	GD	Pts	Qualification	SHB	JAZ	EST	RAY
1	(Saudi Arabia) Al-Shabab	6	5	0	1	12	8	+4	15	Advance to knockout stage	—	1–3	2–1	4–3
2	(United Arab Emirates) Al-Jazira	6	3	1	2	12	10	+2	10	Advance to knockout stage	1–2	—	0–1	3–2
3	(Iran) Esteghlal	6	2	1	3	7	7	0	7		0–1	2–2	—	3–1
4	(Qatar) Al-Rayyan	6	1	0	5	9	15	−6	3		0–2	2–3	1–0	—

25 February 2014
19:20 UTC+4

Al-Jazira (United Arab Emirates)	3–2	(Qatar) Al-Rayyan
Caicedo 3'; Barrada 9'; Al Ghilani 73'	Report	González 59'; Uche 90+2'

Mohammed Bin Zayed Stadium, Abu Dhabi
Attendance: 13,528
Referee: Nawaf Shukralla (Bahrain)
25 February 2014
19:30 UTC+3:30

Esteghlal (Iran)	0–1	(Saudi Arabia) Al-Shabab
	Report	Khalili 58'

Azadi Stadium, Tehran
Attendance: 23,300
Referee: Tan Hai (China PR)

11 March 2014
18:30 UTC+3

Al-Rayyan (Qatar)	1–0	(Iran) Esteghlal
Uche 14'	Report

Ahmed bin Ali Stadium, Al Rayyan
Attendance: 2,394
Referee: Peter Green (Australia)
11 March 2014
20:25 UTC+3

Al-Shabab (Saudi Arabia)	1–3	(United Arab Emirates) Al-Jazira
Otaif 53'	Report	Mabkhout 7'; Qasem 12'; Jucilei 56'

King Fahd International Stadium, Riyadh
Attendance: 4,286
Referee: Strebre Delovski (Australia)

18 March 2014
19:30 UTC+3:30

Esteghlal (Iran)	2–2	(United Arab Emirates) Al-Jazira
Ghazi 17'; Omranzadeh 65'	Report	Barrada 6', 56'

Azadi Stadium, Tehran
Attendance: 6,350
Referee: Hettikamkanamge Perera (Sri Lanka)
18 March 2014
20:30 UTC+3

Al-Shabab (Saudi Arabia)	4–3	(Qatar) Al-Rayyan
Al-Marshedi 3'; Otaif 22'; Rafinha 48', 56'	Report	Uche 9', 41'; Al-Korbi 18'

King Fahd International Stadium, Riyadh
Attendance: 4,680
Referee: Minoru Tōjō (Japan)

2 April 2014
19:40 UTC+4

Al-Jazira (United Arab Emirates)	0–1	(Iran) Esteghlal
	Report	Ghazi 69'

Mohammed Bin Zayed Stadium, Abu Dhabi
Attendance: 13,550
Referee: Kim Dong-jin (South Korea)
2 April 2014
18:45 UTC+3

Al-Rayyan (Qatar)	0–2	(Saudi Arabia) Al-Shabab
	Report	Al-Mehyani 7'; Fallatah 90+2'

Ahmed bin Ali Stadium, Al Rayyan
Attendance: 729
Referee: Kim Jong-hyeok (South Korea)

16 April 2014
18:55 UTC+3

Al-Rayyan (Qatar)	2–3	(United Arab Emirates) Al-Jazira
Yakubu 48' (pen.); Haroon 53'	Report	Barrada 45'; Mabkhout 60'; Cho Yong-hyung 90' (o.g.)

Ahmed bin Ali Stadium, Al Rayyan
Attendance: 950
Referee: Abdullah Al Hilali (Oman)
16 April 2014
20:35 UTC+3

Al-Shabab (Saudi Arabia)	2–1	(Iran) Esteghlal
Menegazzo 82' (pen.); Al-Dosari 90+5'	Report	Borhani 47'

King Fahd International Stadium, Riyadh
Attendance: 4,100
Referee: Nawaf Shukralla (Bahrain)

23 April 2014
21:00 UTC+4:30

Esteghlal (Iran)	3–1	(Qatar) Al-Rayyan
Kébé 54', 73'; Ghazi 60'	Report	Khalfan 81'

Azadi Stadium, Tehran
Attendance: 330
Referee: Mohd Amirul Izwan Bin Yaacob (Malaysia)
23 April 2014
20:30 UTC+4

Al-Jazira (United Arab Emirates)	1–2	(Saudi Arabia) Al-Shabab
Ali 58'	Report	Al-Ruwaili 35', 89'

Mohammed Bin Zayed Stadium, Abu Dhabi
Attendance: 2,952
Referee: Masaaki Toma (Japan)

=== Group B ===
Pos	Team	Pld	W	D	L	GF	GA	GD	Pts	Qualification	FLD	BUN	JSH	FAT
1	(Iran) Foolad	6	4	2	0	11	3	+8	14	Advance to knockout stage	—	1–0	3–1	1–0
2	(Uzbekistan) Bunyodkor	6	2	2	2	7	7	0	8 (Note: Tiebreakers: Bunyodkor and El-Jaish are tied on head-to-head record and overall goal difference, and so are ranked on overall goals scored.)	Advance to knockout stage	1–1	—	1–2	3–2
3	(Qatar) El Jaish	6	2	2	2	6	6	0	8		0–0	1–2	—	2–0
4	(Saudi Arabia) Al-Fateh	6	0	2	4	3	11	−8	2		1–5	0–0	0–0	—

Notes:
25 February 2014
20:00 UTC+3

Al-Fateh (Saudi Arabia)	0–0	(Uzbekistan) Bunyodkor
	Report

Prince Abdullah bin Jalawi Stadium, Al-Hasa
Attendance: 13,200
Referee: Kim Dong-jin (South Korea)
25 February 2014
20:00 UTC+3

El Jaish (Qatar)	0–0	(Iran) Foolad
	Report

Abdullah bin Khalifa Stadium, Doha
Attendance: 5,417
Referee: Kim Sang-woo (South Korea)

11 March 2014
17:00 UTC+5

Bunyodkor (Uzbekistan)	1–2	(Qatar) El Jaish
Pardaev 90+3'	Report	Nilmar 34', 69'

Pakhtakor Markaziy Stadium, Tashkent
Attendance: 3,600
Referee: Masaaki Toma (Japan)
11 March 2014
16:30 UTC+3:30

Foolad (Iran)	1–0	(Saudi Arabia) Al-Fateh
Rahmani 68' (pen.)	Report

Ghadir Stadium, Ahvaz
Attendance: 37,391
Referee: Ryuji Sato (Japan)

19 March 2014
18:00 UTC+5

Bunyodkor (Uzbekistan)	1–1	(Iran) Foolad
Shodiev 90+2'	Report	Karami 74'

Pakhtakor Markaziy Stadium, Tashkent
Attendance: 1,950
Referee: Ali Shaban (Kuwait)
19 March 2014
20:00 UTC+3

Al-Fateh (Saudi Arabia)	0–0	(Qatar) El Jaish
	Report

Prince Abdullah bin Jalawi Stadium, Al-Hasa
Attendance: 5,000
Referee: Mohamed Al Zarouni (United Arab Emirates)

1 April 2014
17:30 UTC+4:30

Foolad (Iran)	1–0	(Uzbekistan) Bunyodkor
Vali 77'	Report

Ghadir Stadium, Ahvaz
Attendance: 24,175
Referee: Mohamed Al Zarouni (United Arab Emirates)
1 April 2014
20:00 UTC+3

El Jaish (Qatar)	2–0	(Saudi Arabia) Al-Fateh
Nilmar 58' (pen.); Fayez 89'	Report

Abdullah bin Khalifa Stadium, Doha
Attendance: 5,024
Referee: Nagor Amir Noor Mohamed (Malaysia)

16 April 2014
18:00 UTC+5

Bunyodkor (Uzbekistan)	3–2	(Saudi Arabia) Al-Fateh
Zoteev 43'; Shodiev 83'; Rakhmatullaev 85'	Report	Fuakumputu 68'; Al-Hamdan 79'

Pakhtakor Markaziy Stadium, Tashkent
Attendance: 2,150
Referee: Ko Hyung-jin (South Korea)
16 April 2014
17:30 UTC+4:30

Foolad (Iran)	3–1	(Qatar) El Jaish
Rahmani 21'; Rezaei 45'; Chimba 90+3'	Report	Nilmar 10'

Ghadir Stadium, Ahvaz
Attendance: 38,452
Referee: Minoru Tōjō (Japan)

23 April 2014
20:15 UTC+3

Al-Fateh (Saudi Arabia)	1–5	(Iran) Foolad
Al-Nakhli 62'	Report	Chimba 10', 36' (pen.), 44' (pen.); Rezaei 78', 90+4' (pen.)

Prince Abdullah bin Jalawi Stadium, Al-Hasa
Attendance: 300
Referee: Chris Beath (Australia)
23 April 2014
20:15 UTC+3

El Jaish (Qatar)	1–2	(Uzbekistan) Bunyodkor
Muntari 52'	Report	Symonenko 13'; Rashidov 90+4'

Abdullah bin Khalifa Stadium, Doha
Attendance: 5,184
Referee: Mohanad Qasim Eesee Sarray (Iraq)

=== Group C ===
Pos	Team	Pld	W	D	L	GF	GA	GD	Pts	Qualification	AIN	ITT	LEK	TRA
1	(United Arab Emirates) Al-Ain	6	3	2	1	14	7	+7	11	Advance to knockout stage	—	1–1	2–1	3–1
2	(Saudi Arabia) Al-Ittihad	6	3	1	2	8	6	+2	10	Advance to knockout stage	2–1	—	3–1	2–0
3	(Qatar) Lekhwiya	6	2	1	3	5	10	−5	7		0–5	2–0	—	0–0
4	(Iran) Tractor Sazi	6	1	2	3	4	8	−4	5		2–2	1–0	0–1	—

Source: Soccerway
26 February 2014
16:00 UTC+3:30

Tractor Sazi (Iran)	1–0	(Saudi Arabia) Al-Ittihad
Ansarifard 82'	Report

Sahand Stadium, Tabriz
Attendance: 35,420
Referee: Liu Kwok Man (Hong Kong)
26 February 2014
20:00 UTC+4

Al-Ain (United Arab Emirates)	2–1	(Qatar) Lekhwiya
Diaky 13'; Gyan 65'	Report	Weiss 40'

Hazza Bin Zayed Stadium, Al Ain
Attendance: 4,936
Referee: Peter Green (Australia)

12 March 2014
18:30 UTC+3

Lekhwiya (Qatar)	0–0	(Iran) Tractor Sazi
	Report

Abdullah bin Khalifa Stadium, Doha
Attendance: 2,477
Referee: Kim Dong-jin (South Korea)
12 March 2014
20:20 UTC+3

Al-Ittihad (Saudi Arabia)	2–1	(United Arab Emirates) Al-Ain
Fallatah 68', 75'	Report	Gyan 38'

King Abdul Aziz Stadium, Makkah
Attendance: 16,571
Referee: Kim Jong-hyeok (South Korea)

18 March 2014
18:30 UTC+3

Lekhwiya (Qatar)	2–0	(Saudi Arabia) Al-Ittihad
Soria 22'; Nam Tae-hee 79' (pen.)	Report

Abdullah bin Khalifa Stadium, Doha
Attendance: 3,382
Referee: Yudai Yamamoto (Japan)
18 March 2014
20:15 UTC+4

Al-Ain (United Arab Emirates)	3–1	(Iran) Tractor Sazi
Gyan 16', 73'; M. Abdulrahman 37'	Report	Fakhreddini 42'

Hazza Bin Zayed Stadium, Al Ain
Attendance: 7,103
Referee: Jumpei Iida (Japan)

1 April 2014
19:00 UTC+4:30

Tractor Sazi (Iran)	2–2	(United Arab Emirates) Al-Ain
Daghighi 20'; Ahmadzadeh 61'	Report	Gyan 54'; M. Abdulrahman 59'

Sahand Stadium, Tabriz
Attendance: 39,120
Referee: Muhammad Taqi Aljaafari Bin Jahari (Singapore)
2 April 2014
20:30 UTC+3

Al-Ittihad (Saudi Arabia)	3–1	(Qatar) Lekhwiya
Fallatah 16'; Ab. Assiri 26', 79'	Report	Lami 21'

King Abdul Aziz Stadium, Makkah
Attendance: 15,498
Referee: Abdullah Al Hilali (Oman)

15 April 2014
18:30 UTC+3

Lekhwiya (Qatar)	0–5	(United Arab Emirates) Al-Ain
	Report	Diaky 26'; Brosque 43'; M. Abdulrahman 57'; Gyan 70', 90+2'

Abdullah bin Khalifa Stadium, Doha
Attendance: 3,850
Referee: Strebre Delovski (Australia)
15 April 2014
20:30 UTC+3

Al-Ittihad (Saudi Arabia)	2–0	(Iran) Tractor Sazi
Ab. Assiri 18'; Fallatah 60'	Report

King Abdul Aziz Stadium, Makkah
Attendance: 30,405
Referee: Ben Williams (Australia)

22 April 2014
19:30 UTC+4

Al-Ain (United Arab Emirates)	1–1	(Saudi Arabia) Al-Ittihad
Sharahili 22' (o.g.)	Report	Al-Ghamdi 36' (pen.)

Hazza Bin Zayed Stadium, Al Ain
Attendance: 8,606
Referee: Kim Sang-woo (South Korea)
22 April 2014
20:00 UTC+4:30

Tractor Sazi (Iran)	0–1	(Qatar) Lekhwiya
	Report	Bougherra 73' (pen.)

Sahand Stadium, Tabriz
Attendance: 1,960
Referee: Wang Di (China PR)

=== Group D ===
Pos	Team	Pld	W	D	L	GF	GA	GD	Pts	Qualification	HIL	SAD	AHL	SEP
1	(Saudi Arabia) Al-Hilal	6	2	3	1	12	7	+5	9	Advance to knockout stage	—	5–0	2–2	1–0
2	(Qatar) Al-Sadd	6	2	2	2	8	14	−6	8	Advance to knockout stage	2–2	—	2–1	3–1
3	(United Arab Emirates) Al-Ahli	6	1	4	1	6	6	0	7		0–0	1–1	—	0–0
4	(Iran) Sepahan	6	2	1	3	9	8	+1	7		3–2	4–0	1–2	—

Tiebreakers

- Al-Ahli and Sepahan are ranked on head-to-head record.
26 February 2014
18:30 UTC+3

Al-Sadd (Qatar)	3–1	(Iran) Sepahan
Ibrahim 18'; Belhadj 87'; Tabata 90+2'	Report	Sharifi 78'

Jassim bin Hamad Stadium, Al Rayyan
Attendance: 5,000
Referee: Minoru Tōjō (Japan)
26 February 2014
20:25 UTC+3

Al-Hilal (Saudi Arabia)	2–2	(United Arab Emirates) Al-Ahli
Al-Shamrani 60', 74'	Report	Jiménez 53'; Grafite 58'

King Fahd International Stadium, Riyadh
Attendance: 38,520
Referee: Valentin Kovalenko (Uzbekistan)

12 March 2014
19:00 UTC+3:30

Sepahan (Iran)	3–2	(Saudi Arabia) Al-Hilal
Bulku 18'; Sharifi 72'; Sukaj 90+1'	Report	Castillo 28'; Neves 33'

Foolad Shahr Stadium, Fuladshahr
Attendance: 3,250
Referee: Ben Williams (Australia)
12 March 2014
20:15 UTC+4

Al-Ahli (United Arab Emirates)	1–1	(Qatar) Al-Sadd
Grafite 68'	Report	Belhadj 24'

Al-Rashid Stadium, Dubai
Attendance: 5,749
Referee: Tan Hai (China PR)

19 March 2014
19:00 UTC+3:30

Sepahan (Iran)	1–2	(United Arab Emirates) Al-Ahli
Van Dijk 74'	Report	Khalil 39'; Al Hammadi 90+5'

Foolad Shahr Stadium, Fuladshahr
Attendance: 6,800
Referee: Ko Hyung-jin (South Korea)
19 March 2014
18:45 UTC+3

Al-Sadd (Qatar)	2–2	(Saudi Arabia) Al-Hilal
Al-Bloushi 26'; Belhadj 66'	Report	Neves 45+1', 56'

Jassim bin Hamad Stadium, Al Rayyan
Attendance: 7,761
Referee: Kim Sang-woo (South Korea)

1 April 2014
20:20 UTC+4

Al-Ahli (United Arab Emirates)	0–0	(Iran) Sepahan
	Report

Al-Rashid Stadium, Dubai
Attendance: 7,500
Referee: Ravshan Irmatov (Uzbekistan)
1 April 2014
20:40 UTC+3

Al-Hilal (Saudi Arabia)	5–0	(Qatar) Al-Sadd
Al-Qahtani 3' (pen.); Al-Deayea 28'; Al-Shamrani 34', 58', 62'	Report

King Fahd International Stadium, Riyadh
Attendance: 18,321
Referee: Ryuji Sato (Japan)

15 April 2014
20:30 UTC+4:30

Sepahan (Iran)	4–0	(Qatar) Al-Sadd
Sharifi 48', 56'; Sukaj 63'; Majid 90+3' (o.g.)	Report

Foolad Shahr Stadium, Fuladshahr
Attendance: 6,350
Referee: Kim Dong-jin (South Korea)
15 April 2014
20:30 UTC+4

Al-Ahli (United Arab Emirates)	0–0	(Saudi Arabia) Al-Hilal
	Report

Al-Rashid Stadium, Dubai
Attendance: 9,400
Referee: Kim Jong-hyeok (South Korea)

22 April 2014
20:50 UTC+3

Al-Sadd (Qatar)	2–1	(United Arab Emirates) Al-Ahli
Ibrahim 34'; Tabata 79'	Report	Grafite 15'

Jassim bin Hamad Stadium, Al Rayyan
Attendance: 3,680
Referee: Peter Green (Australia)
22 April 2014
20:50 UTC+3

Al-Hilal (Saudi Arabia)	1–0	(Iran) Sepahan
Al-Shamrani 45+2'	Report

King Fahd International Stadium, Riyadh
Attendance: 49,650
Referee: Yuichi Nishimura (Japan)

=== Group E ===
Pos	Team	Pld	W	D	L	GF	GA	GD	Pts	Qualification	POH	CER	BUR	SHD
1	(South Korea) Pohang Steelers	6	3	3	0	11	6	+5	12	Advance to knockout stage	—	1–1	0–0	2–2
2	(Japan) Cerezo Osaka	6	2	2	2	10	9	+1	8	Advance to knockout stage	0–2	—	4–0	1–3
3	(Thailand) Buriram United	6	1	3	2	5	9	−4	6		1–2	2–2	—	1–0
4	(China) Shandong Luneng Taishan	6	1	2	3	9	11	−2	5		2–4	1–2	1–1	—

25 February 2014
15:30 UTC+8

Shandong Luneng Taishan (China)	1–1	(Thailand) Buriram United
Liu Binbin 83'	Report	Adisak 90+2'

Jinan Olympic Sports Center Stadium, Jinan
Attendance: 26,365
Referee: Alireza Faghani (Iran)
25 February 2014
19:30 UTC+9

Pohang Steelers (South Korea)	1–1	(Japan) Cerezo Osaka
Bae Chun-suk 61'	Report	Kakitani 11'

Pohang Steel Yard, Pohang
Attendance: 10,426
Referee: Ben Williams (Australia)

11 March 2014
19:00 UTC+9

Cerezo Osaka (Japan)	1–3	(China) Shandong Luneng Taishan
Kakitani 84'	Report	Aloísio 5'; Vágner Love 26', 56'

Nagai Stadium, Osaka
Attendance: 11,865
Referee: Abdullah Al Hilali (Oman)
11 March 2014
18:00 UTC+7

Buriram United (Thailand)	1–2	(South Korea) Pohang Steelers
Adisak 69'	Report	Kim Tae-su 19'; Kim Seung-dae 24'

New I-Mobile Stadium, Buriram
Attendance: 10,610
Referee: Nawaf Shukralla (Bahrain)

18 March 2014
19:00 UTC+9

Cerezo Osaka (Japan)	4–0	(Thailand) Buriram United
Kakitani 4'; Minamino 34', 82'; Forlán 90+3'	Report

Nagai Stadium, Osaka
Attendance: 11,259
Referee: Abdullah Balideh (Qatar)
18 March 2014
19:30 UTC+9

Pohang Steelers (South Korea)	2–2	(China) Shandong Luneng Taishan
Kim Tae-su 32'; Kim Seung-dae 78'	Report	Vágner Love 13' (pen.), 23' (pen.)

Pohang Steel Yard, Pohang
Attendance: 5,368
Referee: Ammar Al-Jeneibi (United Arab Emirates)

2 April 2014
18:00 UTC+7

Buriram United (Thailand)	2–2	(Japan) Cerezo Osaka
Theeraton 10'; Suchao 41'	Report	Yamashita 65', 88'

New I-Mobile Stadium, Buriram
Attendance: 14,029
Referee: Strebre Delovski (Australia)
2 April 2014
19:30 UTC+8

Shandong Luneng Taishan (China)	2–4	(South Korea) Pohang Steelers
Du Wei 85'; Han Peng 90+3'	Report	Go Moo-yul 35'; Kim Tae-su 65' (pen.); Kim Seung-dae 71'; Liu Binbin 83' (o.g.)

Jinan Olympic Sports Center Stadium, Jinan
Attendance: 32,817
Referee: Valentin Kovalenko (Uzbekistan)

16 April 2014
19:00 UTC+9

Cerezo Osaka (Japan)	0–2	(South Korea) Pohang Steelers
	Report	Lee Myung-joo 23'; Kim Seung-dae 65'

Nagai Stadium, Osaka
Attendance: 12,037
Referee: Abdulla Hassan Mohamed (United Arab Emirates)
16 April 2014
18:00 UTC+7

Buriram United (Thailand)	1–0	(China) Shandong Luneng Taishan
Hirano 35'	Report

New I-Mobile Stadium, Buriram
Attendance: 14,266
Referee: Hettikamkanamge Perera (Sri Lanka)

23 April 2014
20:00 UTC+9

Pohang Steelers (South Korea)	0–0	(Thailand) Buriram United
	Report

Pohang Steel Yard, Pohang
Attendance: 3,714
Referee: Abdulrahman Abdou (Qatar)
23 April 2014
19:00 UTC+8

Shandong Luneng Taishan (China)	1–2	(Japan) Cerezo Osaka
Vágner Love 19' (pen.)	Report	Kakitani 46'; Forlán 48'

Jinan Olympic Sports Center Stadium, Jinan
Attendance: 26,379
Referee: Fahad Al-Marri (Qatar)

=== Group F ===
Pos	Team	Pld	W	D	L	GF	GA	GD	Pts	Qualification	SEO	HIR	BEI	CCM
1	(South Korea) FC Seoul	6	3	2	1	9	6	+3	11	Advance to knockout stage	—	2–2	2–1	2–0
2	(Japan) Sanfrecce Hiroshima	6	2	3	1	9	8	+1	9	Advance to knockout stage	2–1	—	1–1	1–0
3	(China) Beijing Guoan	6	1	3	2	7	8	−1	6		1–1	2–2	—	2–1
4	(Australia) Central Coast Mariners	6	2	0	4	4	7	−3	6		0–1	2–1	1–0	—

Tiebreakers

- Beijing Guoan and Central Coast Mariners are tied on head-to-head record, and so are ranked by overall goal difference.
25 February 2014
19:00 UTC+9

Sanfrecce Hiroshima (Japan)	1–1	(China) Beijing Guoan
Chiba 77'	Report	Ha Dae-sung 62'

Hiroshima Big Arch, Hiroshima
Attendance: 6,021
Referee: Abdulla Hassan Mohamed (United Arab Emirates)
25 February 2014
19:30 UTC+9

FC Seoul (South Korea)	2–0	(Australia) Central Coast Mariners
Osmar 32' (pen.); Yun Il-lok 56'	Report

Seoul World Cup Stadium, Seoul
Attendance: 6,491
Referee: Fahad Al-Mirdasi (Saudi Arabia)

11 March 2014
19:30 UTC+11

Central Coast Mariners (Australia)	2–1	(Japan) Sanfrecce Hiroshima
Sterjovski 23', 32'	Report	Shiotani 21'

Central Coast Stadium, Gosford
Attendance: 2,168
Referee: Abdulrahman Abdou (Qatar)
11 March 2014
19:30 UTC+8

Beijing Guoan (China)	1–1	(South Korea) FC Seoul
Utaka 20'	Report	Go Yo-han 71'

Workers Stadium, Beijing
Attendance: 33,813
Referee: Banjar Al-Dosari (Qatar)

19 March 2014
19:00 UTC+9

Sanfrecce Hiroshima (Japan)	2–1	(South Korea) FC Seoul
Takahagi 53'; Shiotani 79'	Report	Rafael Costa 60'

Hiroshima Big Arch, Hiroshima
Attendance: 6,281
Referee: Valentin Kovalenko (Uzbekistan)
19 March 2014
19:30 UTC+8

Beijing Guoan (China)	2–1	(Australia) Central Coast Mariners
Shao Jiayi 45'; Utaka 63'	Report	Fitzgerald 85' (pen.)

Workers Stadium, Beijing
Attendance: 32,198
Referee: Nagor Amir Noor Mohamed (Malaysia)

1 April 2014
19:30 UTC+11

Central Coast Mariners (Australia)	1–0	(China) Beijing Guoan
Seip 73'	Report

Central Coast Stadium, Gosford
Attendance: 3,316
Referee: Hettikamkanamge Perera (Sri Lanka)
1 April 2014
19:30 UTC+9

FC Seoul (South Korea)	2–2	(Japan) Sanfrecce Hiroshima
Yun Il-lok 53'; Rafael Costa 90+4' (pen.)	Report	Notsuda 20'; Hwang Seok-ho 70'

Seoul World Cup Stadium, Seoul
Attendance: 8,897
Referee: Fahad Al-Marri (Qatar)

16 April 2014
19:30 UTC+10

Central Coast Mariners (Australia)	0–1	(South Korea) FC Seoul
	Report	Hutchinson 90+2' (o.g.)

Central Coast Stadium, Gosford
Attendance: 4,118
Referee: Ammar Al-Jeneibi (United Arab Emirates)
16 April 2014
19:30 UTC+8

Beijing Guoan (China)	2–2	(Japan) Sanfrecce Hiroshima
Shao Jiayi 55'; Guerrón 60'	Report	Ishihara 66'; Zhao Hejing 70' (o.g.)

Workers Stadium, Beijing
Attendance: 36,738
Referee: Marai Al Awaji (Saudi Arabia)

23 April 2014
19:30 UTC+9

Sanfrecce Hiroshima (Japan)	1–0	(Australia) Central Coast Mariners
Yamagishi 72'	Report

Hiroshima Big Arch, Hiroshima
Attendance: 9,778
Referee: Ravshan Irmatov (Uzbekistan)
23 April 2014
19:30 UTC+9

FC Seoul (South Korea)	2–1	(China) Beijing Guoan
Kang Seung-jo 43'; Yun Ju-tae 57'	Report	Yu Yang 88'

Seoul World Cup Stadium, Seoul
Attendance: 9,562
Referee: Jameel Abdulhusin (Bahrain)

=== Group G ===
Pos	Team	Pld	W	D	L	GF	GA	GD	Pts	Qualification	GUA	JEO	MEL	YFM
1	(China) Guangzhou Evergrande	6	3	1	2	10	8	+2	10	Advance to knockout stage	—	3–1	4–2	2–1
2	(South Korea) Jeonbuk Hyundai Motors	6	2	2	2	8	7	+1	8	Advance to knockout stage	1–0	—	0–0	3–0
3	(Australia) Melbourne Victory	6	2	2	2	9	9	0	8		2–0	2–2	—	1–0
4	(Japan) Yokohama F. Marinos	6	2	1	3	7	10	−3	7		1–1	2–1	3–2	—

Tiebreakers

- Jeonbuk Hyundai Motors and Melbourne Victory are tied on head-to-head record, and so are ranked by overall goal difference.
26 February 2014
19:00 UTC+9

Jeonbuk Hyundai Motors (South Korea)	3–0	(Japan) Yokohama F. Marinos
Lee Seung-gi 61', 69'; Leonardo 72' (pen.)	Report

Jeonju World Cup Stadium, Jeonju
Attendance: 8,328
Referee: Abdullah Balideh (Qatar)
26 February 2014
20:00 UTC+8

Guangzhou Evergrande (China)	4–2	(Australia) Melbourne Victory
Huang Bowen 59'; Diamanti 65', 85'; Elkeson 71'	Report	Contreras 37'; Broxham 41'

Tianhe Stadium, Guangzhou
Attendance: 39,841
Referee: Abdulrahman Abdou (Qatar)

12 March 2014
19:30 UTC+11

Melbourne Victory (Australia)	2–2	(South Korea) Jeonbuk Hyundai Motors
Ansell 31'; Barbarouses 81'	Report	Lee Dong-gook 76', 79'

Docklands Stadium, Melbourne
Attendance: 6,128
Referee: Mohamed Al Zarouni (United Arab Emirates)
12 March 2014
19:30 UTC+9

Yokohama F. Marinos (Japan)	1–1	(China) Guangzhou Evergrande
Hanato 21'	Report	Diamanti 38'

International Stadium Yokohama, Yokohama
Attendance: 12,230
Referee: Marai Al Awaji (Saudi Arabia)

18 March 2014
19:30 UTC+11

Melbourne Victory (Australia)	1–0	(Japan) Yokohama F. Marinos
Barbarouses 9'	Report

Melbourne Rectangular Stadium, Melbourne
Attendance: 6,357
Referee: Mohd Amirul Izwan Bin Yaacob (Malaysia)
18 March 2014
20:00 UTC+8

Guangzhou Evergrande (China)	3–1	(South Korea) Jeonbuk Hyundai Motors
Gao Lin 17', 21'; Liao Lisheng 61'	Report	Lee Dong-gook 39'

Tianhe Stadium, Guangzhou
Attendance: 39,987
Referee: Abdullah Al Hilali (Oman)

2 April 2014
19:00 UTC+9

Jeonbuk Hyundai Motors (South Korea)	1–0	(China) Guangzhou Evergrande
Leonardo 76'	Report

Jeonju World Cup Stadium, Jeonju
Attendance: 18,974
Referee: Mohd Amirul Izwan Bin Yaacob (Malaysia)
2 April 2014
19:30 UTC+9

Yokohama F. Marinos (Japan)	3–2	(Australia) Melbourne Victory
Ito 21'; Nakamachi 27'; Hyodo 89'	Report	Troisi 7' (pen.); J. Jeggo 90+2'

International Stadium Yokohama, Yokohama
Attendance: 7,395
Referee: Ammar Al-Jeneibi (United Arab Emirates)

15 April 2014
19:30 UTC+10

Melbourne Victory (Australia)	2–0	(China) Guangzhou Evergrande
Milligan 2'; Troisi 90+1'	Report

Docklands Stadium, Melbourne
Attendance: 13,120
Referee: Fahad Al-Mirdasi (Saudi Arabia)
15 April 2014
19:30 UTC+9

Yokohama F. Marinos (Japan)	2–1	(South Korea) Jeonbuk Hyundai Motors
Saitō 64', 65'	Report	Han Kyo-won 7'

International Stadium Yokohama, Yokohama
Attendance: 7,110
Referee: Valentin Kovalenko (Uzbekistan)

22 April 2014
19:00 UTC+8

Guangzhou Evergrande (China)	2–1	(Japan) Yokohama F. Marinos
Elkeson 11', 38'	Report	Saitō 85'

Tianhe Stadium, Guangzhou
Attendance: 39,874
Referee: Mohamed Al Zarouni (United Arab Emirates)
22 April 2014
20:00 UTC+9

Jeonbuk Hyundai Motors (South Korea)	0–0	(Australia) Melbourne Victory
	Report

Jeonju World Cup Stadium, Jeonju
Attendance: 12,891
Referee: Nawaf Shukralla (Bahrain)

=== Group H ===
Pos	Team	Pld	W	D	L	GF	GA	GD	Pts	Qualification	WSW	KAW	ULS	GUI
1	(Australia) Western Sydney Wanderers	6	4	0	2	11	5	+6	12	Advance to knockout stage	—	1–0	1–3	5–0
2	(Japan) Kawasaki Frontale	6	4	0	2	7	5	+2	12	Advance to knockout stage	2–1	—	3–1	1–0
3	(South Korea) Ulsan Hyundai	6	2	1	3	8	10	−2	7		0–2	2–0	—	1–1
4	(China) Guizhou Renhe	6	1	1	4	4	10	−6	4		0–1	0–1	3–1	—

Tiebreakers

- Western Sydney Wanderers and Kawasaki Frontale are tied on head-to-head record, and so are ranked by overall goal difference.
26 February 2014
19:30 UTC+11

Western Sydney Wanderers (Australia)	1–3	(South Korea) Ulsan Hyundai
Šantalab 1'	Report	Kim Shin-wook 35'; Ko Chang-hyun 43'; Kang Min-soo 66'

Parramatta Stadium, Sydney
Attendance: 11,212
Referee: Abdullah Al Hilali (Oman)
26 February 2014
19:00 UTC+9

Kawasaki Frontale (Japan)	1–0	(China) Guizhou Renhe
Renato 31'	Report

Todoroki Athletics Stadium, Kawasaki
Attendance: 9,609
Referee: Marai Al Awaji (Saudi Arabia)

12 March 2014
19:30 UTC+9

Ulsan Hyundai (South Korea)	2–0	(Japan) Kawasaki Frontale
Yoo Jun-soo 84'; Kim Shin-wook 90+3'	Report

Ulsan Munsu Football Stadium, Ulsan
Attendance: 2,535
Referee: Alireza Faghani (Iran)
12 March 2014
20:00 UTC+8

Guizhou Renhe (China)	0–1	(Australia) Western Sydney Wanderers
	Report	Bridge 10'

Guiyang Olympic Sports Center, Guiyang
Attendance: 21,184
Referee: Muhammad Taqi Aljaafari Bin Jahari (Singapore)

19 March 2014
19:30 UTC+11

Western Sydney Wanderers (Australia)	1–0	(Japan) Kawasaki Frontale
Haliti 3'	Report

Parramatta Stadium, Sydney
Attendance: 9,292
Referee: Ng Kai Lam (Hong Kong)
19 March 2014
19:30 UTC+9

Ulsan Hyundai (South Korea)	1–1	(China) Guizhou Renhe
Rafinha 58' (pen.)	Report	Yang Hao 87'

Ulsan Munsu Football Stadium, Ulsan
Attendance: 3,150
Referee: Fahad Al-Marri (Qatar)

1 April 2014
19:00 UTC+9

Kawasaki Frontale (Japan)	2–1	(Australia) Western Sydney Wanderers
Nakamura 74'; Oshima 88'	Report	Haliti 24'

Todoroki Athletics Stadium, Kawasaki
Attendance: 10,943
Referee: Fahad Al-Mirdasi (Saudi Arabia)
1 April 2014
20:00 UTC+8

Guizhou Renhe (China)	3–1	(South Korea) Ulsan Hyundai
Chen Zijie 39', 89'; Qu Bo 52'	Report	Yoo Jun-soo 34'

Guiyang Olympic Sports Center, Guiyang
Attendance: 16,120
Referee: Abdulla Hassan Mohamed (United Arab Emirates)

15 April 2014
19:30 UTC+9

Ulsan Hyundai (South Korea)	0–2	(Australia) Western Sydney Wanderers
	Report	Bridge 60'; Šantalab 80'

Ulsan Munsu Football Stadium, Ulsan
Attendance: 2,500
Referee: Abdullah Balideh (Qatar)
15 April 2014
20:00 UTC+8

Guizhou Renhe (China)	0–1	(Japan) Kawasaki Frontale
	Report	Nakamura 38'

Guiyang Olympic Sports Center, Guiyang
Attendance: 25,161
Referee: Banjar Al-Dosari (Qatar)

22 April 2014
20:00 UTC+10

Western Sydney Wanderers (Australia)	5–0	(China) Guizhou Renhe
Cole 7'; Haliti 75'; Mooy 81' (pen.); Ono 85'; Topor-Stanley 88'	Report

Parramatta Stadium, Sydney
Attendance: 11,099
Referee: Alireza Faghani (Iran)
22 April 2014
19:00 UTC+9

Kawasaki Frontale (Japan)	3–1	(South Korea) Ulsan Hyundai
Kobayashi 32'; Ōkubo 34'; Jeci 77'	Report	Rafinha 35'

Todoroki Athletics Stadium, Kawasaki
Attendance: 9,338
Referee: Muhammad Taqi Aljaafari Bin Jahari (Singapore)
