= 2014 AFC Champions League knockout stage =

The knock-out stage of the 2014 AFC Champions League was played from 6 May to 1 November 2014. A total of 16 teams competed in the knock-out stage.

== Qualified teams ==
The winners and runners-up of each of the eight groups in the group stage qualified for the knock-out stage. Both West Zone and East Zone had eight teams qualified.

Zone	Group	Winners	Runners-up
West Zone (Groups A–D)	A	(Saudi Arabia) Al-Shabab	(United Arab Emirates) Al-Jazira
West Zone (Groups A–D)	B	(Iran) Foolad	(Uzbekistan) Bunyodkor
West Zone (Groups A–D)	C	(United Arab Emirates) Al-Ain	(Saudi Arabia) Al-Ittihad
West Zone (Groups A–D)	D	(Saudi Arabia) Al-Hilal	(Qatar) Al-Sadd
East Zone (Groups E–H)	E	(South Korea) Pohang Steelers	(Japan) Cerezo Osaka
East Zone (Groups E–H)	F	(South Korea) FC Seoul	(Japan) Sanfrecce Hiroshima
East Zone (Groups E–H)	G	(China) Guangzhou Evergrande	(South Korea) Jeonbuk Hyundai Motors
East Zone (Groups E–H)	H	(Australia) Western Sydney Wanderers	(Japan) Kawasaki Frontale

== Format ==
In the knock-out stage, the 16 teams played a single-elimination tournament, with the teams split between the two zones until the final. Each tie was played on a home-and-away two-legged basis. The away goals rule, extra time (away goals do not apply in extra time) and penalty shoot-out were used to decide the winner if necessary.

== Schedule ==
The schedule of each round was as follows.

Round	First leg	Second leg
Round of 16	6–7 May 2014	13–14 May 2014
Quarter-finals	19–20 August 2014	26–27 August 2014
Semi-finals	16–17 September 2014	30 September–1 October 2014
Final	25 October 2014	1 November 2014

== Bracket ==
In the round of 16, the winners of one group played the runners-up of another group in the same zone, with the group winners hosting the second leg. The matchups were determined as follows:

West Zone

- Winner Group A vs. Runner-up Group C
- Winner Group C vs. Runner-up Group A
- Winner Group B vs. Runner-up Group D
- Winner Group D vs. Runner-up Group B

East Zone

- Winner Group E vs. Runner-up Group G
- Winner Group G vs. Runner-up Group E
- Winner Group F vs. Runner-up Group H
- Winner Group H vs. Runner-up Group F

The draw for the quarter-finals was held on 28 May 2014, 16:00 UTC+8, at the AFC House in Kuala Lumpur, Malaysia. The "country protection" rule was not applied, so teams from the same association could be drawn into the same tie.

There was no draw for the semi-finals, with the matchups determined by the quarter-final draw: Winner QF1 vs. Winner QF2 (West Zone) and Winner QF3 vs. Winner QF4 (East Zone), with winners QF2 and QF4 hosting the second leg.

The draw to decide the order of two legs of the final was held after the quarter-final draw.

Round of 16
(South Korea) Jeonbuk Hyundai Motors	1	0	1
(South Korea) Pohang Steelers	2	1	3
(Japan) Kawasaki Frontale	2	2	4
(South Korea) FC Seoul (a)	3	1	4
(Japan) Sanfrecce Hiroshima	3	0	3
(Australia) Western Sydney Wanderers (a)	1	2	3
(Japan) Cerezo Osaka	1	1	2
(China) Guangzhou Evergrande	5	0	5
(Uzbekistan) Bunyodkor	0	0	0
(Saudi Arabia) Al-Hilal	1	3	4
(Qatar) Al-Sadd (a)	0	2	2
(Iran) Foolad	0	2	2
(United Arab Emirates) Al-Jazira	1	1	2
(United Arab Emirates) Al-Ain	2	2	4
(Saudi Arabia) Al-Ittihad	1	3	4
(Saudi Arabia) Al-Shabab	0	1	1

Quarter-finals
(South Korea) Pohang Steelers	0	0	0 (0)
(South Korea) FC Seoul (p)	0	0	0 (3)
(Australia) Western Sydney Wanderers (a)	1	1	2
(China) Guangzhou Evergrande	0	2	2
(Saudi Arabia) Al-Hilal	1	0	1
(Qatar) Al-Sadd	0	0	0
(United Arab Emirates) Al-Ain	2	3	5
(Saudi Arabia) Al-Ittihad	0	1	1

Semi-finals
(South Korea) FC Seoul	0	0	0
(Australia) Western Sydney Wanderers	0	2	2
(Saudi Arabia) Al-Hilal	3	1	4
(United Arab Emirates) Al-Ain	0	2	2

Final
(Australia) Western Sydney Wanderers	1	0	1
(Saudi Arabia) Al-Hilal	0	0	0

== Round of 16 ==
West Zone
Team 1	Agg.	Team 2	1st leg	2nd leg
Al-Ittihad (Saudi Arabia)	4–1	(Saudi Arabia) Al-Shabab	1–0	3–1
Al-Jazira (United Arab Emirates)	2–4	(United Arab Emirates) Al-Ain	1–2	1–2
Al-Sadd (Qatar)	2–2 (a)	(Iran) Foolad	0–0	2–2
Bunyodkor (Uzbekistan)	0–4	(Saudi Arabia) Al-Hilal	0–1	0–3

East Zone
Team 1	Agg.	Team 2	1st leg	2nd leg
Jeonbuk Hyundai Motors (South Korea)	1–3	(South Korea) Pohang Steelers	1–2	0–1
Cerezo Osaka (Japan)	2–5	(China) Guangzhou Evergrande	1–5	1–0
Kawasaki Frontale (Japan)	4–4 (a)	(South Korea) FC Seoul	2–3	2–1
Sanfrecce Hiroshima (Japan)	3–3 (a)	(Australia) Western Sydney Wanderers	3–1	0–2

=== First leg ===
6 May 2014
16:00 UTC+9

Jeonbuk Hyundai Motors (South Korea)	1–2	(South Korea) Pohang Steelers
Lee Jae-sung 54'	Report	Son Joon-ho 58'; Go Moo-yul 74'

Jeonju World Cup Stadium, Jeonju
Attendance: 19,327
Referee: Banjar Al-Dosari (Qatar)

6 May 2014
19:00 UTC+9

Cerezo Osaka (Japan)	1–5	(China) Guangzhou Evergrande
Hasegawa 30'	Report	Muriqui 22', 84'; Elkeson 34' (pen.), 37'; Gao Lin 78'

Nagai Stadium, Osaka
Attendance: 17,612
Referee: Muhammad Taqi Aljaafari Bin Jahari (Singapore)

6 May 2014
20:00 UTC+4

Al-Jazira (United Arab Emirates)	1–2	(United Arab Emirates) Al-Ain
Fayez 58'	Report	Gyan 11'; O. Abdulrahman 15'

Mohammed Bin Zayed Stadium, Abu Dhabi
Attendance: 18,650
Referee: Kim Jong-hyeok (South Korea)

6 May 2014
20:50 UTC+3

Al-Ittihad (Saudi Arabia)	1–0	(Saudi Arabia) Al-Shabab
Fallatah 77'	Report

King Abdul Aziz Stadium, Makkah
Attendance: 15,549
Referee: Hettikamkanamge Perera (Sri Lanka)

7 May 2014
19:00 UTC+9

Sanfrecce Hiroshima (Japan)	3–1	(Australia) Western Sydney Wanderers
Ishihara 51', 65'; Shibasaki 90+1'	Report	Juric 78' (pen.)

Hiroshima Big Arch, Hiroshima
Attendance: 8,423
Referee: Abdullah Al Hilali (Oman)

7 May 2014
19:00 UTC+9

Kawasaki Frontale (Japan)	2–3	(South Korea) FC Seoul
Kobayashi 49'; Renato 61' (pen.)	Report	Escudero 51'; Kim Chi-woo 83'; Yun Il-lok 90+3'

Todoroki Athletics Stadium, Kawasaki
Attendance: 9,161
Referee: Mohamed Al Zarouni (United Arab Emirates)

7 May 2014
18:00 UTC+5

Bunyodkor (Uzbekistan)	0–1	(Saudi Arabia) Al-Hilal
	Report	S. Al-Dawsari 38'

Pakhtakor Markaziy Stadium, Tashkent
Attendance: 5,360
Referee: Mohd Amirul Izwan Bin Yaacob (Malaysia)

7 May 2014
19:00 UTC+3

Al-Sadd (Qatar)	0–0	(Iran) Foolad
	Report

Jassim bin Hamad Stadium, Al Rayyan
Attendance: 6,320
Referee: Ryuji Sato (Japan)

=== Second leg ===
13 May 2014
19:30 UTC+9

Pohang Steelers (South Korea)	1–0	(South Korea) Jeonbuk Hyundai Motors
Kim Seung-dae 6'	Report

Pohang Steel Yard, Pohang
Attendance: 13,155
Referee: Ravshan Irmatov (Uzbekistan)

Pohang Steelers won 3–1 on aggregate.

13 May 2014
20:00 UTC+8

Guangzhou Evergrande (China)	0–1	(Japan) Cerezo Osaka
	Report	Liao Lisheng 49' (o.g.)

Tianhe Stadium, Guangzhou
Attendance: 38,431
Referee: Alireza Faghani (Iran)

Guangzhou Evergrande won 5–2 on aggregate.

13 May 2014
20:00 UTC+4

Al-Ain (United Arab Emirates)	2–1	(United Arab Emirates) Al-Jazira
Gyan 61', 81'	Report	Mabkhout 17'

Hazza Bin Zayed Stadium, Al Ain
Attendance: 9,379
Referee: Valentin Kovalenko (Uzbekistan)

Al-Ain won 4–2 on aggregate.

13 May 2014
20:45 UTC+3

Al-Shabab (Saudi Arabia)	1–3	(Saudi Arabia) Al-Ittihad
Al-Ruwaili 80'	Report	Fallatah 8'; F. Al-Muwallad 72', 90+1'

King Fahd International Stadium, Riyadh
Attendance: 18,643
Referee: Yuichi Nishimura (Japan)

Al-Ittihad won 4–1 on aggregate.

14 May 2014
19:30 UTC+10

Western Sydney Wanderers (Australia)	2–0	(Japan) Sanfrecce Hiroshima
Cole 55'; Šantalab 85'	Report

Parramatta Stadium, Sydney
Attendance: 10,639
Referee: Nawaf Shukralla (Bahrain)

3–3 on aggregate. Western Sydney Wanderers won on away goals.

14 May 2014
19:30 UTC+9

FC Seoul (South Korea)	1–2	(Japan) Kawasaki Frontale
Escudero 8'	Report	Kobayashi 29'; Morishima 90+2'

Seoul World Cup Stadium, Seoul
Attendance: 12,287
Referee: Abdulrahman Abdou (Qatar)

4–4 on aggregate. FC Seoul won on away goals.

14 May 2014
19:30 UTC+4:30

Foolad (Iran)	2–2	(Qatar) Al-Sadd
Chimba 77' (pen.), 87'	Report	Belhadj 16'; Ibrahim 29'

Ghadir Stadium, Ahvaz
Attendance: 48,753
Referee: Kim Dong-jin (South Korea)

2–2 on aggregate. Al-Sadd won on away goals.

14 May 2014
21:00 UTC+3

Al-Hilal (Saudi Arabia)	3–0	(Uzbekistan) Bunyodkor
Al-Qahtani 20'; Al-Shamrani 47'; S. Al-Dawsari 58'	Report

King Fahd International Stadium, Riyadh
Attendance: 40,851
Referee: Ben Williams (Australia)

Al-Hilal won 4–0 on aggregate.

== Quarter-finals ==
West Zone
Team 1	Agg.	Team 2	1st leg	2nd leg
Al-Hilal (Saudi Arabia)	1–0	(Qatar) Al-Sadd	1–0	0–0
Al-Ain (United Arab Emirates)	5–1	(Saudi Arabia) Al-Ittihad	2–0	3–1

East Zone
Team 1	Agg.	Team 2	1st leg	2nd leg
Pohang Steelers (South Korea)	0–0 (a.e.t.) (0–3p)	(South Korea) FC Seoul	0–0	0–0 (a.e.t.)
Western Sydney Wanderers (Australia)	2–2 (a)	(China) Guangzhou Evergrande	1–0	1–2

=== First leg ===
19 August 2014
20:00 UTC+4

Al-Ain (United Arab Emirates)	2–0	(Saudi Arabia) Al-Ittihad
Ismail 48'; Gyan 61'	Report

Hazza Bin Zayed Stadium, Al Ain
Attendance: 18,830
Referee: Abdullah Al Hilali (Oman)

19 August 2014
20:55 UTC+3

Al-Hilal (Saudi Arabia)	1–0	(Qatar) Al-Sadd
Al-Faraj 71'	Report

King Fahd International Stadium, Riyadh
Attendance: 63,500
Referee: Valentin Kovalenko (Uzbekistan)

20 August 2014
19:30 UTC+10

Western Sydney Wanderers (Australia)	1–0	(China) Guangzhou Evergrande
Golec 60'	Report

Parramatta Stadium, Sydney
Attendance: 17,093
Referee: Abdulla Hassan Mohamed (United Arab Emirates)

20 August 2014
19:30 UTC+9

Pohang Steelers (South Korea)	0–0	(South Korea) FC Seoul
	Report

Pohang Steel Yard, Pohang
Attendance: 6,553
Referee: Fahad Al-Mirdasi (Saudi Arabia)

=== Second leg ===
26 August 2014
19:00 UTC+3

Al-Sadd (Qatar)	0–0	(Saudi Arabia) Al-Hilal
	Report

Jassim bin Hamad Stadium, Al Rayyan
Attendance: 14,200
Referee: Kim Jong-hyeok (South Korea)

Al-Hilal won 1–0 on aggregate.

26 August 2014
20:50 UTC+3

Al-Ittihad (Saudi Arabia)	1–3	(United Arab Emirates) Al-Ain
Ismail 35' (o.g.)	Report	Gyan 40'; O. Abdulrahman 66'; Diaky 84'

King Abdul Aziz Stadium, Makkah
Attendance: 342
Referee: Peter Green (Australia)

Al-Ain won 5–1 on aggregate.

27 August 2014
19:30 UTC+9

FC Seoul (South Korea)	0–0 (a.e.t.)	(South Korea) Pohang Steelers
	Report
Penalties
Éverton Santos (penalty scored); Osmar (penalty scored); Kim Jin-kyu (penalty missed); Molina (penalty scored)	3–0	(penalty missed) Hwang Ji-soo; (penalty missed) Kim Jae-sung; (penalty missed) Park Hee-chul

Seoul World Cup Stadium, Seoul
Attendance: 14,122
Referee: Abdullah Balideh (Qatar)

0–0 on aggregate. FC Seoul won 3–0 on penalties.

27 August 2014
20:00 UTC+8

Guangzhou Evergrande (China)	2–1	(Australia) Western Sydney Wanderers
Diamanti 61'; Elkeson 90+1'	Report	Juric 58' (pen.)

Tianhe Stadium, Guangzhou
Attendance: 39,874
Referee: Ryuji Sato (Japan)

2–2 on aggregate. Western Sydney Wanderers won on away goals.

Notes

1. The Al-Ittihad and Al-Ain match was played behind closed doors due to punishment by AFC.

== Semi-finals ==
West Zone
Team 1	Agg.	Team 2	1st leg	2nd leg
Al-Hilal (Saudi Arabia)	4–2	(United Arab Emirates) Al-Ain	3–0	1–2

East Zone
Team 1	Agg.	Team 2	1st leg	2nd leg
FC Seoul (South Korea)	0–2	(Australia) Western Sydney Wanderers	0–0	0–2

=== First leg ===
16 September 2014
20:30 UTC+3

Al-Hilal (Saudi Arabia)	3–0	(United Arab Emirates) Al-Ain
Al-Shamrani 61', 64'; Neves 70'	Report

King Fahd International Stadium, Riyadh
Attendance: 57,170
Referee: Masaaki Toma (Japan)

17 September 2014
19:30 UTC+9

FC Seoul (South Korea)	0–0	(Australia) Western Sydney Wanderers
	Report

Seoul World Cup Stadium, Seoul
Attendance: 12,901
Referee: Nawaf Shukralla (Bahrain)

=== Second leg ===
30 September 2014
19:15 UTC+4

Al-Ain (United Arab Emirates)	2–1	(Saudi Arabia) Al-Hilal
Lee Myung-joo 10'; Kembo 78'	Report	Al-Shamrani 66'

Hazza Bin Zayed Stadium, Al Ain
Attendance: 24,204
Referee: Ravshan Irmatov (Uzbekistan)

Al-Hilal won 4–2 on aggregate.

1 October 2014
19:30 UTC+10

Western Sydney Wanderers (Australia)	2–0	(South Korea) FC Seoul
Poljak 3'; Cole 64'	Report

Parramatta Stadium, Sydney
Attendance: 18,896
Referee: Abdulrahman Abdou (Qatar)

Western Sydney Wanderers won 2–0 on aggregate.

== Final ==
Team 1	Agg.	Team 2	1st leg	2nd leg
Western Sydney Wanderers (Australia)	1–0	(Saudi Arabia) Al-Hilal	1–0	0–0

25 October 2014
19:30 UTC+11

Western Sydney Wanderers (Australia)	1–0	(Saudi Arabia) Al-Hilal
Juric 64'	Report

Parramatta Stadium, Sydney
Attendance: 20,053
Referee: Alireza Faghani (Iran)
1 November 2014
20:30 UTC+3

Al-Hilal (Saudi Arabia)	0–0	(Australia) Western Sydney Wanderers
	Report

King Fahd International Stadium, Riyadh
Attendance: 63,763
Referee: Yuichi Nishimura (Japan)

Western Sydney Wanderers won 1–0 on aggregate.
