= 2014 AFC Champions League qualifying play-off =

Football tournament in Asia

The qualifying play-off of the 2014 AFC Champions League was played from 29 January to 15 February 2014, to decide four of the 32 places in the group stage.

== Format ==
The bracket for the qualifying play-off was determined by the AFC based on the association ranking of each team, with teams from the higher-ranked associations entering at later rounds. Teams from the same association may not play each other in the qualifying play-off. Each tie was played as a single match, with the team from the higher-ranked association hosting the match. Extra time and penalty shoot-out were used to decide the winner if necessary. The winners of each tie in round 3 advanced to the group stage to join the 28 automatic qualifiers. All losers of each round from associations with only play-off slots entered the AFC Cup group stage.

== Teams ==
The following 19 teams (11 from West Zone, 8 from East Zone) were entered into the qualifying play-off:

Zone	Teams entering in Round 3	Teams entering in Round 2	Teams entering in Round 1
West Zone		(United Arab Emirates) Baniyas; (Qatar) Lekhwiya; (Qatar) El Jaish; (Uzbekistan) Lokomotiv Tashkent; (Uzbekistan) Nasaf Qarshi	(Jordan) Shabab Al-Ordon; (Oman) Al-Suwaiq; (Bahrain) Al-Hidd; (Iraq) Al-Shorta; Al-Kuwait; (Kuwait) Al-Qadsia
East Zone	(China) Beijing Guoan; (Australia) Melbourne Victory	(Thailand) Muangthong United; (Thailand) Chonburi	(India) Pune; (Singapore) Tampines Rovers; (Hong Kong) South China; (Vietnam) Hà Nội T&T

== Schedule ==
The schedule of the competition was as follows.

Round	Match date
Round 1	2 February 2014
Round 2	8 February 2014
Round 3	15 February 2014

== Bracket ==
=== West Zone ===
Round 1
(Oman) Al-Suwaiq	0
(Kuwait) Al-Qadsia	1
(Jordan) Shabab Al-Ordon	1
(Bahrain) Al-Hidd (a.e.t.)	3
Al-Kuwait	1
(Iraq) Al-Shorta	0

Round 2
(Qatar) El Jaish	5
(Uzbekistan) Nasaf Qarshi	1
(United Arab Emirates) Baniyas	0
(Kuwait) Al-Qadsia	4
(Qatar) Lekhwiya	2
(Bahrain) Al-Hidd	1
(Uzbekistan) Lokomotiv Tashkent	1
Al-Kuwait	3

Round 3
(Qatar) El Jaish	3
(Kuwait) Al-Qadsia	0
(Qatar) Lekhwiya	4
Al-Kuwait	1

Advance to group stage
(Qatar) El Jaish	—
(Qatar) Lekhwiya	—

=== East Zone ===
Round 1
(Singapore) Tampines Rovers	1
(Hong Kong) South China (a.e.t.)	2
(India) Pune	0
(Vietnam) Hà Nội T&T	3

Round 2
(Thailand) Chonburi	3
(Hong Kong) South China	0
(Thailand) Muangthong United	2
(Vietnam) Hà Nội T&T	0

Round 3
(China) Beijing Guoan	4
(Thailand) Chonburi	0
(Australia) Melbourne Victory	2
(Thailand) Muangthong United	1

Advance to group stage
(China) Beijing Guoan	—
(Australia) Melbourne Victory	—

== Round 1 ==
West Zone
Team 1	Score	Team 2
Al-Suwaiq (Oman)	0–1	(Kuwait) Al-Qadsia
Shabab Al-Ordon (Jordan)	1–3 (a.e.t.)	(Bahrain) Al-Hidd
Al-Kuwait	1–0	(Iraq) Al-Shorta

East Zone
Team 1	Score	Team 2
Tampines Rovers (Singapore)	1–2 (a.e.t.)	(Hong Kong) South China
Pune (India)	0–3	(Vietnam) Hà Nội T&T

=== West Zone ===
2 February 2014
19:00 UTC+4

Al-Suwaiq (Oman)	0–1	(Kuwait) Al-Qadsia
	Report	Keita 90+4'

Al-Seeb Stadium, Al-Seeb
Attendance: 6,200
Referee: Abdulrahman Abdou (Qatar)

2 February 2014
17:00 UTC+2

Shabab Al-Ordon (Jordan)	1–3 (a.e.t.)	(Bahrain) Al-Hidd
Mubaideen 42'	Report	Tuca 83' (pen.); Orok 96', 102'

Amman International Stadium, Amman
Attendance: 579
Referee: Abdullah Al Hilali (Oman)

2 February 2014
19:30 UTC+3

Al-Kuwait	1–0	(Iraq) Al-Shorta
Nekounam 63'	Report

Al Kuwait Sports Club Stadium, Kuwait City
Attendance: 1,450
Referee: Abdulla Hassan Mohamed (United Arab Emirates)

=== East Zone ===
29 January 2014
18:30 UTC+5:30

Pune (India)	0–3	(Vietnam) Hà Nội T&T
	Report	Gallagher 52'; Nguyễn Văn Quyết 71'; Hector 83'

Shree Shiv Chhatrapati Sports Complex, Pune
Attendance: 4,500
Referee: Abdullah Balideh (Qatar)

2 February 2014
19:30 UTC+8

Tampines Rovers (Singapore)	1–2 (a.e.t.)	(Hong Kong) South China
Mrdaković 64'	Report	Barisic 20', 103'

Jalan Besar Stadium, Singapore
Attendance: 1,192
Referee: Jumpei Iida (Japan)

== Round 2 ==
West Zone
Team 1	Score	Team 2
Baniyas (United Arab Emirates)	0–4	(Kuwait) Al-Qadsia
El Jaish (Qatar)	5–1	(Uzbekistan) Nasaf Qarshi
Lekhwiya (Qatar)	2–1	(Bahrain) Al-Hidd
Lokomotiv Tashkent (Uzbekistan)	1–3	Al-Kuwait

East Zone
Team 1	Score	Team 2
Chonburi (Thailand)	3–0	(Hong Kong) South China
Muangthong United (Thailand)	2–0	(Vietnam) Hà Nội T&T

=== West Zone ===
8 February 2014
18:00 UTC+3

Lekhwiya (Qatar)	2–1	(Bahrain) Al-Hidd
Nam Tae-hee 35'; Nasief 48' (o.g.)	Report	Nasief 60'

Abdullah bin Khalifa Stadium, Doha
Attendance: 927
Referee: Mohamed Al Zarouni (United Arab Emirates)

8 February 2014
20:00 UTC+4

Baniyas (United Arab Emirates)	0–4	(Kuwait) Al-Qadsia
	Report	Neda 10'; Al Soma 35'; Al Sheikh 73'; Al Ansari 83'

Baniyas Stadium, Abu Dhabi
Attendance: 1,932
Referee: Fahad Al-Mirdasi (Saudi Arabia)

8 February 2014
19:00 UTC+3

El Jaish (Qatar)	5–1	(Uzbekistan) Nasaf Qarshi
Go Seul-ki 4', 27', 80'; Nilmar 36'; Abubakar 49'	Report	Sayfiev 76'

Suheim bin Hamad Stadium, Doha
Attendance: 5,400
Referee: Strebre Delovski (Australia)

9 February 2014
14:00 UTC+5

Lokomotiv Tashkent (Uzbekistan)	1–3	Al-Kuwait
Nagaev 66'	Report	Jemâa 22', 37', 86'

Pakhtakor Markaziy Stadium, Tashkent
Attendance: 5,000
Referee: Minoru Tōjō (Japan)

Notes

1. Lokomotiv Tashkent v Al-Kuwait was originally scheduled to be played on 8 February 2014, 15:00 UTC+5, but was postponed due to heavy snowfall.

=== East Zone ===
8 February 2014
19:30 UTC+7

Muangthong United (Thailand)	2–0	(Vietnam) Hà Nội T&T
Gjurovski 36'; Bothroyd 62'	Report

SCG Stadium, Nonthaburi
Attendance: 7,927
Referee: Kim Dong-jin (South Korea)

9 February 2014
18:30 UTC+7

Chonburi (Thailand)	3–0	(Hong Kong) South China
Pipob 19'; Cunha 37', 55'	Report

Chonburi Municipality Stadium, Chonburi
Attendance: 7,336
Referee: Peter Green (Australia)

== Round 3 ==
West Zone
Team 1	Score	Team 2
El Jaish (Qatar)	3–0	(Kuwait) Al-Qadsia
Lekhwiya (Qatar)	4–1	Al-Kuwait

East Zone
Team 1	Score	Team 2
Beijing Guoan (China)	4–0	(Thailand) Chonburi
Melbourne Victory (Australia)	2–1	(Thailand) Muangthong United

=== West Zone ===
15 February 2014
18:00 UTC+3

Lekhwiya (Qatar)	4–1	Al-Kuwait
Soria 29'; Msakni 72'; Boudiaf 78'; Luiz Ceará 90+3'	Report	Nekounam 34' (pen.)

Abdullah bin Khalifa Stadium, Doha
Attendance: 2,075
Referee: Kim Jong-hyeok (South Korea)

15 February 2014
20:00 UTC+3

El Jaish (Qatar)	3–0	(Kuwait) Al-Qadsia
Nilmar 36'; Muntari 63'; El-Sayed 85'	Report

Suheim bin Hamad Stadium, Doha
Attendance: 5,326
Referee: Ryuji Sato (Japan)

=== East Zone ===
15 February 2014
19:45 UTC+11

Melbourne Victory (Australia)	2–1	(Thailand) Muangthong United
Troisi 58'; Broxham 83'	Report	Gjurovski 22'

Kardinia Park, Geelong
Attendance: 8,304
Referee: Masaaki Toma (Japan)

15 February 2014
19:30 UTC+8

Beijing Guoan (China)	4–0	(Thailand) Chonburi
Guerrón 1', 11'; Utaka 18'; Shao Jiayi 89'	Report

Workers Stadium, Beijing
Attendance: 20,055
Referee: Valentin Kovalenko (Uzbekistan)
