= Rashid Mahazi =

Australian soccer player (born 1992)

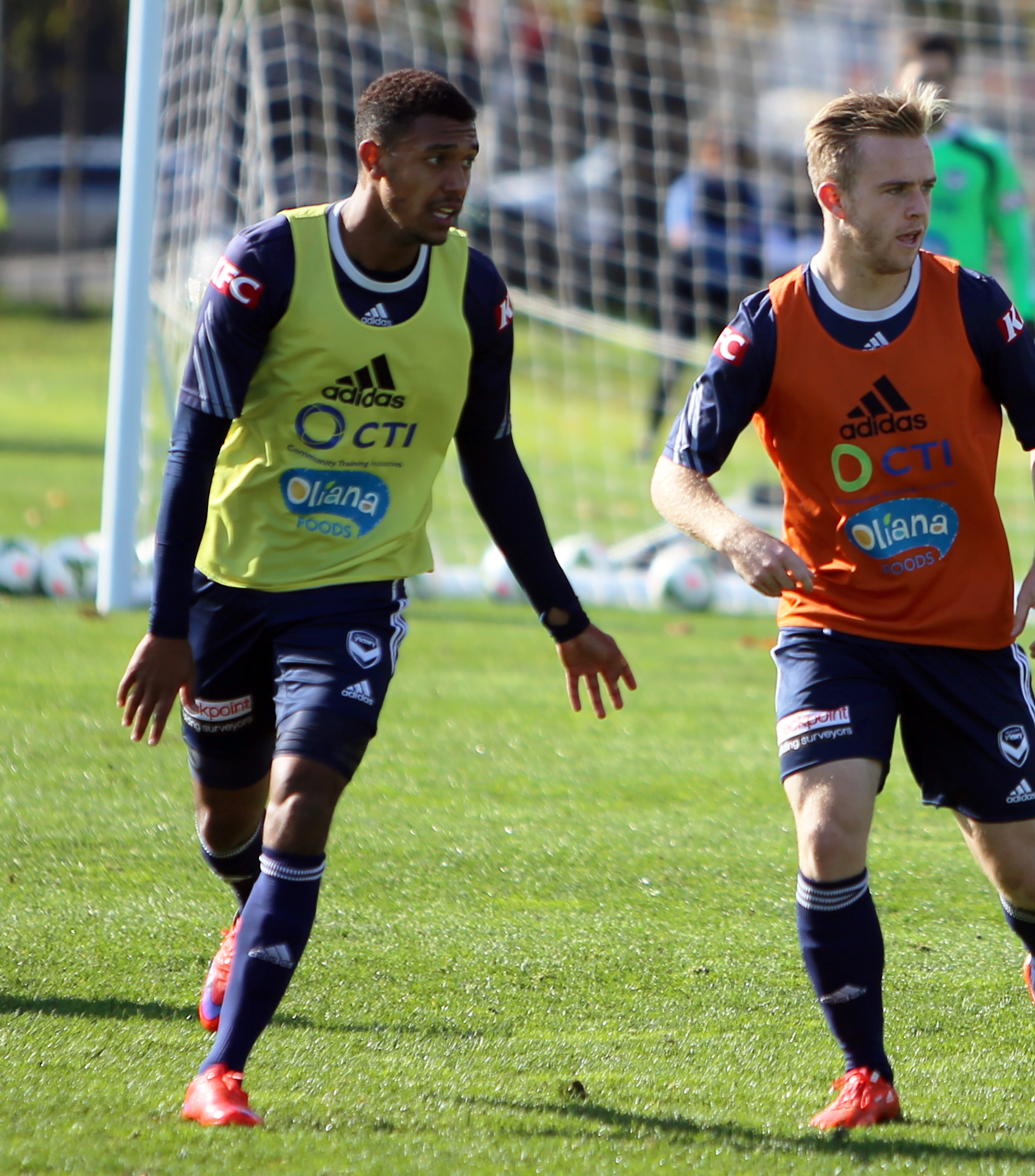
- Rashid Mahazi (left) with Connor Pain (right) training for Melbourne Victory, May 2015

Personal information
- Full name: Rashid Abdulhakim Mahazi
- Date of birth: 20 April 1992 (age 34)
- Place of birth: Melbourne, Victoria, Australia
- Height: 1.78 m (5 ft 10 in)
- Position: Central midfielder

Youth career
- Monash City
- Box Hill United
- Dandenong Thunder
- River Plate
- Independiente
- 2013: Northcote City

Senior career*
Years	Team	Apps	(Gls)
2013	Northcote City	15	(0)
2013–2017	Melbourne Victory	73	(0)
2017–2018	Moreland Zebras	27	(2)
2018–2019	Western Sydney Wanderers	16	(1)
2019	Moreland Zebras	2	(0)
2019–2020	Incheon United	20	(1)
Total		97	(4)
- * Club domestic league appearances and goals as of 28 December 2020

Rashid Abdulhakim Mahazi (born 20 April 1992) is an Australian former football player. A natural defensive minded player, Mahazi also played as a right back or as a defensive midfielder as he primarily did in the 2014–15 A-League season, under coach Kevin Muscat in Melbourne Victory's premiership and grand final victories. He announced his retirement in December 2020.

== Early life ==
Mahazi was born in Melbourne, Victoria, on 20 April 1992 to an Australian mother and Dinka Kenyan father. Mahazi began his soccer playing for Monash City as a child, where his father was the coach. His father died during the 2016–17 A-League season, and this was considered be a factor when Mahazi decided at the season's conclusion to take a hiatus from the sport.

Rashid attended Rowville Secondary College as part of the Rowville Sports Academy, Football program. He later returned as an Assistant coach in the program.

== Youth career ==
Mahazi became a defensive minded central midfielder but would also occasionally play as a right back. Mahazi started his junior development at Monash City FC, and progressed through the youth systems of Box Hill United, Dandenong Thunder, before moving to Argentina play with River Plate and Independiente.

Whilst with Independiente, Mahazi first received public attention in Melbourne after local Herald Sun journalist Matt Windley wrote an article on News.com.au about Australian footballers playing overseas on 7 January 2013. Upon being released and returning home to Australia, Mahazi signed for Victorian Premier League club Northcote City, where he would make fifteen appearances. At the conclusion of the 2013 season, Mahazi signed his first professional contract with hometown club Melbourne Victory in the A-League, then under Ange Postecoglou weeks before his departure to the Socceroos.

== Club career ==
=== Melbourne Victory ===
==== 2013–14 ====
Mahazi signed his first professional senior contract with home town giants Melbourne Victory on 4 October 2013 on a two-year contract, being the fifth signing, following Pablo Contreras, James Troisi, Kosta Barbarouses & Mitch Nichols. Mahazi made his debut at professional level on 12 October 2013 against local rivals Melbourne Heart in a 0–0 draw. He started in the right central midfield role and was given a yellow card at the 41st minute of the match following a challenge, logging 79 minutes before being substituted for injury returning Guilherme Finkler. Mahazi would have to wait four rounds until he could make his second appearance in round six, whilst being on the bench three of those four times. His first away appearance for Melbourne and second start, turned out to be Mahazi's first full ninety-minute appearance against the Western Sydney Wanderers in a 0–1 loss at Pirtek Stadium, on 16 November 2013. His performance awarded him a first full appearance in front of his home supporters on 23 November, in a 3–0 win over Adelaide United at Etihad Stadium. Mahazi was to make another eleven A-League appearances for Melbourne, bringing the season total to fourteen, logging a total of 1,046 minutes and twelve starts.

Mahazi was selected by coach Kevin Muscat to be part of the victory's thirty man squad. He was on the bench for play off match against Muangthong United, but featured in all six group stage games, making his Asian and continental debut against Guangzhou Evergrande coming on as a substitute in the 67th minute with the game finishing in a 2–4 loss. He logged a total of 384 minutes, and started in four of these six games, with three being full ninety-minute appearances.

Along with making his A-League and ACL debut, Mahazi also made his home and away debuts to national finals football, for Melbourne Victory. Mahazi played in both of the Victory's elimination and semi-final games, coming on as a substitute in both, logging a total of 34 minutes in finals football.

==== 2014–15 ====
Mahazi featured in the first game of the A-League & Melbourne Victory's tenth season, coming on as a substitute for Macedonian team mate Daniel Georgievski in the 86th minute, against Western Sydney Wanderers on 10 October 2014. Following this appearance, Mahazi went on to make eighteen more appearances for Melbourne Victory in the A-League season with five of these being starts, two of which were full ninety-minute appearances, as well as thirteen substitution appearances, including the premiership winning match against Central Coast Mariners on 26 April 2015. Mahazi did not participate in the 2014 FFA Cup for the Victory.

Mahazi featured in both matches as a substitute of the Victory's 2015 final series campaign. Mahazi was substituted on for Mathieu Delpierre in the 89th minute of the semi-final derby against Melbourne City on 8 May 2015. Mahazi's grand final debut came the week later on 17 May 2015 against Sydney FC, being substituted on for Gui Finkler at the 87th minute.

==== 2015–16 ====
With the offseason departure of Mark Milligan, and with captain Carl Valeri ruled out for the majority of the season for medical reasons, Mahazi featured in 23 of the Victory's 28 A-League matches, starting 16 times. Mahazi featured in the 2015 FFA Cup Final victory against Perth Glory, being substituted on at the 84th minute for Guilherme Finkler. In total, Mahazi made 780 passes, won 78 duels, and 110 recoveries throughout the season, and was named as one of the Herald Sun's top 5 unsung heroes of the A-League season.

==== 2016–17 ====
On 23 July 2016, Mahazi made his unofficial first appearance for the 2016–17 campaign, starting for Melbourne in the club's inaugural International Champions Cup match against Juventus in the 2016 tournament, in what finished in a 4–3 victory on penalties at the Melbourne Cricket Ground. On 3 August 2016, Mahazi officially commenced the season in the round of 32 of the 2016 FFA Cup, starting for Melbourne against Newcastle Jets winning 3–1. Following the departure of marquee Oliver Bozanic, Mahazi became a regular fixture in midfield to the dismay of supporters, who were critical of his first touch and passing skills. In the regular season's conclusion, Mahazi made thirteen appearances including five starts.

In the final series, Mahazi was an unused substitute in both the semi and grand final matches, but was awarded runners up medal. It is believed in the grand final that Kevin Muscat planned to have Mahazi be substituted on for captain Carl Valeri but was averted following the contraction of a migraine in the pre game warm up. Days after the club's loss in the grand final, it was reported that Mahazi was planning to take hiatus from the sport for personal reasons, reportedly turning down a renewal offer from Melbourne as well as two other offers from unnamed clubs. On 12 May 2017, Melbourne confirmed that Mahazi was to depart the football club, having made a total of ninety-four appearances in four separate competitions.

== Career statistics ==
As of 31 October 2020

Club	Season	League^{[A]}			Cup^{[B]}		Continental^{[C]}		Total	
Club	Season	Division	Apps	Goals	Apps	Goals	Apps	Goals	Apps	Goals
Northcote City	2013	Victorian Premier League	15	0	1	0	—		16	0
Northcote City	Total		15	0	1	0	0	0	16	0
Melbourne Victory	2013–14	A-League	16	0	—		6	0	22	0
Melbourne Victory	2014–15	A-League	21	0	1	0	—		22	0
Melbourne Victory	2015–16	A-League	23	0	4	0	4	0	31	0
Melbourne Victory	2016–17	A-League	13	0	3	0	—		16	0
Melbourne Victory	Total		73	0	8	0	10	0	91	0
Western Sydney; Wanderers	2018–19	A-League	16	1	0	0	—		16	1
Western Sydney; Wanderers	Total		18	1	0	0	0	0	18	1
Incheon United	2019	K League 1	13	1	0	0	—		13	1
Incheon United	2020	K League 1	7	0	0	0	—		7	0
Incheon United	Total		20	1	0	0	0	0	20	1
Career total			126	2	9	0	10	0	145	2

=== Footnotes ===
A Includes appearances in the A-League finals.
B Includes appearances in the Dockerty and FFA cups.
C Includes appearances in the AFC Champions League.

== Honours ==
=== Club ===
Melbourne Victory:

- A-League Championship: 2014–2015
- A-League Premiership: 2014–2015
- FFA Cup: 2015
