= 2014 AFC Champions League =

33rd edition of premier club football tournament organized by the AFC

Tournament details
- Dates: 29 January – 1 November 2014
- Teams: 47 (from 19 associations)

Final positions
- Champions: (Australia) Western Sydney Wanderers (1st title)
- Runners-up: (Saudi Arabia) Al-Hilal

Tournament statistics
- Matches played: 126
- Goals scored: 325 (2.58 per match)
- Attendance: 1,897,236 (15,057 per match)
- Top scorer(s): Asamoah Gyan (12 goals)
- Best player: Ante Covic

The 2014 AFC Champions League was the 33rd edition of the top-level Asian club football tournament organized by the Asian Football Confederation (AFC), and the 12th under the current AFC Champions League title. Guangzhou Evergrande were the defending champions, but were eliminated by Western Sydney Wanderers in the quarter-finals.

In the final, Western Sydney Wanderers of Australia defeated Al-Hilal of Saudi Arabia 1–0 on aggregate, to become the first Australian team to win the title, and in doing so qualified for the 2014 FIFA Club World Cup. The Australian club were making their debut in the competition, having won entry to the competition by winning the 2012–13 A-League Premiership in their first year of existence.

== Allocation of entries per association ==
The AFC laid out the procedure for deciding the participating associations and the allocation of slots, with inspection of the associations interested in participating in the AFC Champions League to be carried out in 2013, and the final decision to be made by the AFC on 26 November 2013.

The AFC Competitions Committee proposed the following participating criteria for the 2014–2016 editions of the AFC Champions League on 12 March 2013:

- The top 23 member associations (MAs) as per the AFC rankings can apply either for direct slots or play-off slots. The interested MAs are given points and ranked according to the AFC evaluating system.
- In both the East and West zones, there are a total of 14 direct slots in the group stage, with the 2 remaining slots filled through play-offs.
- The top five MAs in both the East and West zones, if they acquire a minimum of 600 points, get direct slots in the group stage, while the remaining MAs, if they meet the minimum requirements, get play-off slots. The following scheme of allocating slots was approved by the AFC for the 2014–16 tournaments:
  - The top two ranked MAs in both the East and West zones get four direct slots each.
  - The third-ranked MAs get three direct and one play-off slot.
  - The fourth-ranked MAs get two direct and two play-off slots.
  - The fifth-ranked MAs get one direct and two play-off slots.
  - The sixth- to eleventh-ranked MAs each get one play-off slot.
- The maximum number of slots for each MA is one-third of the total number of clubs in the top division (e.g., Australia can only get a maximum of three total slots as there are only nine Australia-based clubs in the A-League).
- The AFC Cup winners and runners-up are given a play-off slot, regardless of their respective MA's rank, as long as the club meets the minimum criteria. If they have already qualified based on domestic performance, the slot is given to the next eligible club in its MA, as long as the club meets the minimum criteria.

On 26 November 2013, the AFC Executive Committee approved the slots for the 2014 edition of the AFC Champions League.

Evaluation for 2014 AFC Champions League
| Fulfills criteria (> 600 points) |
| Does not fulfill criteria, but allocated slots |
| Not assessed, but allocated slots |

West Asia Zone
| Rank | Member Association | Points | Slots | | | |
| Rank | Member Association | Points | Group stage | Play-off | | |
| Rank | Member Association | Points | Group stage | Round 3 | Round 2 | Round 1 |
|---|---|---|---|---|---|---|
| 1 | Iran | 908.47 | 4 | 0 | 0 | 0 |
| 2 | Saudi Arabia | 869.62 | 4 | 0 | 0 | 0 |
| 3 | United Arab Emirates | 848.94 | 3 | 0 | 1 | 0 |
| 4 | Qatar | 848.56 | 2 | 0 | 2 | 0 |
| 5 | Uzbekistan | 693.38 | 1 | 0 | 2 | 0 |
| 6 | India | 526.55 | 0 | 0 | 0 | 1 |
| 7 | Jordan | 500.89 | 0 | 0 | 0 | 1 |
| 8 | Oman | 390.02 | 0 | 0 | 0 | 1 |
| 9 | Bahrain | 253.67 | 0 | 0 | 0 | 1 |
| 10 | Iraq | — | 0 | 0 | 0 | 1 |
| 10 | Kuwait | — | 0 | 0 | 0 | 1+1 |
| Total | | | 14 | 0 | 5 | 6 |
| Total | | | 14 | 11 | | |

East Asia Zone
| Rank | Member Association | Points | Slots | | | |
| Rank | Member Association | Points | Group stage | Play-off | | |
| Rank | Member Association | Points | Group stage | Round 3 | Round 2 | Round 1 |
|---|---|---|---|---|---|---|
| 1 | Japan | 935.30 | 4 | 0 | 0 | 0 |
| 2 | South Korea | 887.45 | 4 | 0 | 0 | 0 |
| 3 | China PR | 843.54 | 3 | 1 | 0 | 0 |
| 4 | Australia | 804.08 | 2 | 1 | 0 | 0 |
| 5 | Thailand | 601.20 | 1 | 0 | 2 | 0 |
| 6 | Singapore | 438.34 | 0 | 0 | 0 | 1 |
| 7 | Hong Kong | 408.02 | 0 | 0 | 0 | 1 |
| 8 | Vietnam | 301.31 | 0 | 0 | 0 | 1 |
| Total | | | 14 | 2 | 2 | 4 |
| Total | | | 14 | 8 | | |

Notes

1. The play-off entrant from India is moved to the East Asia Zone.
2. Kuwait got one play-off slot based on the AFC Champions League evaluation. Moreover, Al-Kuwait and Al-Qadsia were the 2013 AFC Cup winners and runners-up respectively, and were given play-off slots. However, since they were the only two Kuwaiti clubs which passed the club licensing requirements, Kuwait only had two teams entering the qualifying play-off.

== Teams ==
The following teams entered the competition.

In the following table, the number of appearances and last appearance count only those since the 2002–03 season (including qualifying rounds), when the competition was rebranded as the AFC Champions League. TH means title holders.

West Asia Zone
| Team | Qualifying method | App | Last App |
Group stage direct entrants (Groups A–D)
| (Iran) Esteghlal | 2012–13 Iran Pro League champions | 7th | 2013 |
| (Iran) Sepahan | 2012–13 Hazfi Cup winners 2012–13 Iran Pro League 3rd place | 10th | 2013 |
| (Iran) Tractor | 2012–13 Iran Pro League runners-up | 2nd | 2013 |
| (Iran) Foolad | 2012–13 Iran Pro League 4th place | 2nd | 2006 |
| (Saudi Arabia) Al-Fateh | 2012–13 Saudi Professional League champions | 1st | none |
| (Saudi Arabia) Al-Ittihad | 2013 King Cup of Champions winners | 9th | 2012 |
| (Saudi Arabia) Al-Hilal | 2012–13 Saudi Professional League runners-up | 10th | 2013 |
| (Saudi Arabia) Al-Shabab | 2012–13 Saudi Professional League 3rd place | 8th | 2013 |
| (United Arab Emirates) Al-Ain | 2012–13 UAE Pro-League champions | 9th | 2013 |
| (United Arab Emirates) Al-Ahli | 2012–13 UAE President's Cup winners 2012–13 UAE Pro-League runners-up | 5th | 2010 |
| (United Arab Emirates) Al-Jazira | 2012–13 UAE Pro-League 3rd place | 6th | 2013 |
| (Qatar) Al-Sadd | 2012–13 Qatar Stars League champions | 9th | 2011 |
| (Qatar) Al-Rayyan | 2013 Emir of Qatar Cup winners | 6th | 2013 |
| (Uzbekistan) Bunyodkor | 2013 Uzbek League champions and 2013 Uzbekistan Cup winners | 7th | 2013 |
Qualifying play-off participants
Entering in Round 2
| (United Arab Emirates) Baniyas | 2012–13 UAE Pro-League 4th place | 2nd | 2012 |
| (Qatar) Lekhwiya | 2012–13 Qatar Stars League runners-up | 3rd | 2013 |
| (Qatar) El Jaish | 2012–13 Qatar Stars League 3rd place | 2nd | 2013 |
| (Uzbekistan) Lokomotiv Tashkent | 2013 Uzbek League runners-up | 2nd | 2013 |
| (Uzbekistan) Nasaf Qarshi | 2013 Uzbek League 3rd place | 2nd | 2012 |
Entering in Round 1
| (Jordan) Shabab Al-Ordon | 2012–13 Jordan League champions | 1st | none |
| (Oman) Al-Suwaiq | 2012–13 Oman Elite League champions | 1st | none |
| (Bahrain) Al-Hidd | 2012–13 Bahrain First Division League 3rd place | 1st | none |
| (Iraq) Al-Shorta | 2012–13 Iraqi Elite League champions | 3rd | 2005 |
| Al-Kuwait | 2013 AFC Cup winners and 2012–13 Kuwaiti Premier League champions | 5th | 2008 |
| (Kuwait) Al-Qadsia | 2013 AFC Cup runners-up 2012–13 Kuwaiti Premier League runners-up | 4th | 2008 |

East Asia Zone
| Team | Qualifying method | App | Last App |
Group stage direct entrants (Groups E–H)
| (Japan) Sanfrecce Hiroshima | 2013 J. League Division 1 champions | 3rd | 2013 |
| (Japan) Yokohama F. Marinos | 2013 Emperor's Cup winners 2013 J. League Division 1 runners-up | 3rd | 2005 |
| (Japan) Kawasaki Frontale | 2013 J. League Division 1 3rd place | 4th | 2010 |
| (Japan) Cerezo Osaka | 2013 J. League Division 1 4th place | 2nd | 2011 |
| (South Korea) Pohang Steelers | 2013 K League Classic champions and 2013 Korean FA Cup winners | 6th | 2013 |
| (South Korea) Ulsan Hyundai | 2013 K League Classic runners-up | 4th | 2012 |
| (South Korea) Jeonbuk Hyundai Motors | 2013 K League Classic 3rd place | 8th | 2013 |
| (South Korea) FC Seoul | 2013 K League Classic 4th place | 4th | 2013 |
| (China) Guangzhou Evergrande^{TH} | 2013 Chinese Super League champions | 3rd | 2013 |
| (China) Guizhou Renhe | 2013 Chinese FA Cup winners | 2nd | 2013 |
| (China) Shandong Luneng Taishan | 2013 Chinese Super League runners-up | 6th | 2011 |
| (Australia) Western Sydney Wanderers | 2012–13 A-League premiers | 1st | none |
| (Australia) Central Coast Mariners | 2013 A-League Grand Final winners 2012–13 A-League regular season runners-up | 4th | 2013 |
| (Thailand) Buriram United | 2013 Thai Premier League champions and 2013 Thai FA Cup winners | 4th | 2013 |
Qualifying play-off participants
Entering in Round 3
| (China) Beijing Guoan | 2013 Chinese Super League 3rd place | 6th | 2013 |
| (Australia) Melbourne Victory | 2012–13 A-League regular season 3rd place | 4th | 2011 |
Entering in Round 2
| (Thailand) Muangthong United | 2013 Thai Premier League runners-up | 4th | 2013 |
| (Thailand) Chonburi | 2013 Thai Premier League 3rd place | 3rd | 2012 |
Entering in Round 1
| (India) Pune | 2012–13 I-League runners-up | 1st | none |
| (Singapore) Tampines Rovers | 2013 S.League champions | 1st | none |
| (Hong Kong) South China | 2012–13 Hong Kong First Division League champions | 2nd | 2002–03 |
| (Vietnam) Hà Nội T&T | 2013 V.League 1 champions | 1st | none |

Notes

1. Bahrain (BHR): Al-Hidd were chosen to represent Bahrain in the AFC Champions League as they passed the club licensing requirements.
2. India (IND): Pune were chosen to represent India in the AFC Champions League as they passed the club licensing requirements.
Location of teams of the 2014 AFC Champions League.
West Asia Zone
East Asia Zone
(p) Qualifying play-off participants

== Schedule ==
The schedule of the competition was as follows (all draws held at AFC headquarters in Kuala Lumpur, Malaysia).

| Phase | Round | Draw date | First leg | Second leg |
|---|---|---|---|---|
| Qualifying play-off | Round 1 | N/A | 2 February 2014 | |
| Qualifying play-off | Round 2 | N/A | 8 February 2014 | |
| Qualifying play-off | Round 3 | N/A | 15 February 2014 | |
| Group stage | Matchday 1 | 10 December 2013 | 25–26 February 2014 | |
| Group stage | Matchday 2 | 10 December 2013 | 11–12 March 2014 | |
| Group stage | Matchday 3 | 10 December 2013 | 18–19 March 2014 | |
| Group stage | Matchday 4 | 10 December 2013 | 1–2 April 2014 | |
| Group stage | Matchday 5 | 10 December 2013 | 15–16 April 2014 | |
| Group stage | Matchday 6 | 10 December 2013 | 22–23 April 2014 | |
| Knock-out stage | Round of 16 | 10 December 2013 | 6–7 May 2014 | 13–14 May 2014 |
| Knock-out stage | Quarter-finals | 28 May 2014 | 19–20 August 2014 | 26–27 August 2014 |
| Knock-out stage | Semi-finals | 28 May 2014 | 16–17 September 2014 | 30 September–1 October 2014 |
| Knock-out stage | Final | 28 May 2014 | 25 October 2014 | 1 November 2014 |

On 25 November 2013, the AFC Competitions Committee proposed to continue to play the final over two legs on a home-and-away basis (instead of reverting to playing the final as a single match as original proposed), and to split the competition on zonal basis to guarantee an East vs West final for the next three years.

== Qualifying play-off ==
The bracket for the qualifying play-off was determined by the AFC based on the association ranking of each team, with teams from the higher-ranked associations entering at later rounds. Teams from the same association may not play each other in the qualifying play-off. Each tie was played as a single match, with the team from the higher-ranked association hosting the match. Extra time and penalty shoot-out were used to decide the winner if necessary. The winners of each tie in round 3 advanced to the group stage to join the 28 automatic qualifiers. All losers of each round from associations with only play-off slots entered the 2014 AFC Cup group stage.

=== Round 1 ===
| Team 1 | Score | Team 2 |
West Asia Zone
| Al-Suwaiq (Oman) | 0–1 | (Kuwait) Al-Qadsia |
| Shabab Al-Ordon (Jordan) | 1–3 (a.e.t.) | (Bahrain) Al-Hidd |
| Al-Kuwait | 1–0 | (Iraq) Al-Shorta |
East Asia Zone
| Tampines Rovers (Singapore) | 1–2 (a.e.t.) | (Hong Kong) South China |
| Pune (India) | 0–3 | (Vietnam) Hà Nội T&T |

=== Round 2 ===
| Team 1 | Score | Team 2 |
West Asia Zone
| Baniyas (United Arab Emirates) | 0–4 | (Kuwait) Al-Qadsia |
| El Jaish (Qatar) | 5–1 | (Uzbekistan) Nasaf Qarshi |
| Lekhwiya (Qatar) | 2–1 | (Bahrain) Al-Hidd |
| Lokomotiv Tashkent (Uzbekistan) | 1–3 | Al-Kuwait |
East Asia Zone
| Chonburi (Thailand) | 3–0 | (Hong Kong) South China |
| Muangthong United (Thailand) | 2–0 | (Vietnam) Hà Nội T&T |

=== Round 3 ===
| Team 1 | Score | Team 2 |
West Asia Zone
| El Jaish (Qatar) | 3–0 | (Kuwait) Al-Qadsia |
| Lekhwiya (Qatar) | 4–1 | Al-Kuwait |
East Asia Zone
| Beijing Guoan (China) | 4–0 | (Thailand) Chonburi |
| Melbourne Victory (Australia) | 2–1 | (Thailand) Muangthong United |

== Group stage ==
The draw for the group stage was held on 10 December 2013. The 32 teams were drawn into eight groups of four. Teams from the same association could not be drawn into the same group. Each group was played on a home-and-away round-robin basis. The winners and runners-up of each group advanced to the round of 16.

Tiebreakers

The teams are ranked according to points (3 points for a win, 1 point for a draw, 0 points for a loss). If tied on points, tiebreakers are applied in the following order:

1. Greater number of points obtained in the group matches between the teams concerned
2. Goal difference resulting from the group matches between the teams concerned
3. Greater number of goals scored in the group matches between the teams concerned (away goals do not apply)
4. Goal difference in all the group matches
5. Greater number of goals scored in all the group matches
6. Penalty shoot-out if only two teams are involved and they are both on the field of play
7. Fewer score calculated according to the number of yellow and red cards received in the group matches (1 point for a single yellow card, 3 points for a red card as a consequence of two yellow cards, 3 points for a direct red card, 4 points for a yellow card followed by a direct red card)
8. Drawing of lots

=== Group A ===
| Pos | Team | Pld | W | D | L | GF | GA | GD | Pts | Qualification | SHB | JAZ | EST | RAY |
|---|---|---|---|---|---|---|---|---|---|---|---|---|---|---|
| 1 | (Saudi Arabia) Al-Shabab | 6 | 5 | 0 | 1 | 12 | 8 | +4 | 15 | Advance to knockout stage | — | 1–3 | 2–1 | 4–3 |
| 2 | (United Arab Emirates) Al-Jazira | 6 | 3 | 1 | 2 | 12 | 10 | +2 | 10 | Advance to knockout stage | 1–2 | — | 0–1 | 3–2 |
| 3 | (Iran) Esteghlal | 6 | 2 | 1 | 3 | 7 | 7 | 0 | 7 | | 0–1 | 2–2 | — | 3–1 |
| 4 | (Qatar) Al-Rayyan | 6 | 1 | 0 | 5 | 9 | 15 | −6 | 3 | | 0–2 | 2–3 | 1–0 | — |

=== Group B ===
| Pos | Team | Pld | W | D | L | GF | GA | GD | Pts | Qualification | FLD | BUN | JSH | FAT |
|---|---|---|---|---|---|---|---|---|---|---|---|---|---|---|
| 1 | (Iran) Foolad | 6 | 4 | 2 | 0 | 11 | 3 | +8 | 14 | Advance to knockout stage | — | 1–0 | 3–1 | 1–0 |
| 2 | (Uzbekistan) Bunyodkor | 6 | 2 | 2 | 2 | 7 | 7 | 0 | 8 (Note: Tiebreakers: Bunyodkor and El-Jaish are tied on head-to-head record and overall goal difference, and so are ranked on overall goals scored.) | Advance to knockout stage | 1–1 | — | 1–2 | 3–2 |
| 3 | (Qatar) El Jaish | 6 | 2 | 2 | 2 | 6 | 6 | 0 | 8 | | 0–0 | 1–2 | — | 2–0 |
| 4 | (Saudi Arabia) Al-Fateh | 6 | 0 | 2 | 4 | 3 | 11 | −8 | 2 | | 1–5 | 0–0 | 0–0 | — |

Notes:

Tiebreakers

- Bunyodkor and El-Jaish are tied on head-to-head record and overall goal difference, and so are ranked on overall goals scored.

=== Group C ===
| Pos | Team | Pld | W | D | L | GF | GA | GD | Pts | Qualification | AIN | ITT | LEK | TRA |
|---|---|---|---|---|---|---|---|---|---|---|---|---|---|---|
| 1 | (United Arab Emirates) Al-Ain | 6 | 3 | 2 | 1 | 14 | 7 | +7 | 11 | Advance to knockout stage | — | 1–1 | 2–1 | 3–1 |
| 2 | (Saudi Arabia) Al-Ittihad | 6 | 3 | 1 | 2 | 8 | 6 | +2 | 10 | Advance to knockout stage | 2–1 | — | 3–1 | 2–0 |
| 3 | (Qatar) Lekhwiya | 6 | 2 | 1 | 3 | 5 | 10 | −5 | 7 | | 0–5 | 2–0 | — | 0–0 |
| 4 | (Iran) Tractor Sazi | 6 | 1 | 2 | 3 | 4 | 8 | −4 | 5 | | 2–2 | 1–0 | 0–1 | — |

Source: Soccerway

=== Group D ===
| Pos | Team | Pld | W | D | L | GF | GA | GD | Pts | Qualification | HIL | SAD | AHL | SEP |
|---|---|---|---|---|---|---|---|---|---|---|---|---|---|---|
| 1 | (Saudi Arabia) Al-Hilal | 6 | 2 | 3 | 1 | 12 | 7 | +5 | 9 | Advance to knockout stage | — | 5–0 | 2–2 | 1–0 |
| 2 | (Qatar) Al-Sadd | 6 | 2 | 2 | 2 | 8 | 14 | −6 | 8 | Advance to knockout stage | 2–2 | — | 2–1 | 3–1 |
| 3 | (United Arab Emirates) Al-Ahli | 6 | 1 | 4 | 1 | 6 | 6 | 0 | 7 | | 0–0 | 1–1 | — | 0–0 |
| 4 | (Iran) Sepahan | 6 | 2 | 1 | 3 | 9 | 8 | +1 | 7 | | 3–2 | 4–0 | 1–2 | — |

Tiebreakers

- Al-Ahli and Sepahan are ranked on head-to-head record.

=== Group E ===
| Pos | Team | Pld | W | D | L | GF | GA | GD | Pts | Qualification | POH | CER | BUR | SHD |
|---|---|---|---|---|---|---|---|---|---|---|---|---|---|---|
| 1 | (South Korea) Pohang Steelers | 6 | 3 | 3 | 0 | 11 | 6 | +5 | 12 | Advance to knockout stage | — | 1–1 | 0–0 | 2–2 |
| 2 | (Japan) Cerezo Osaka | 6 | 2 | 2 | 2 | 10 | 9 | +1 | 8 | Advance to knockout stage | 0–2 | — | 4–0 | 1–3 |
| 3 | (Thailand) Buriram United | 6 | 1 | 3 | 2 | 5 | 9 | −4 | 6 | | 1–2 | 2–2 | — | 1–0 |
| 4 | (China) Shandong Luneng Taishan | 6 | 1 | 2 | 3 | 9 | 11 | −2 | 5 | | 2–4 | 1–2 | 1–1 | — |

=== Group F ===
| Pos | Team | Pld | W | D | L | GF | GA | GD | Pts | Qualification | SEO | HIR | BEI | CCM |
|---|---|---|---|---|---|---|---|---|---|---|---|---|---|---|
| 1 | (South Korea) FC Seoul | 6 | 3 | 2 | 1 | 9 | 6 | +3 | 11 | Advance to knockout stage | — | 2–2 | 2–1 | 2–0 |
| 2 | (Japan) Sanfrecce Hiroshima | 6 | 2 | 3 | 1 | 9 | 8 | +1 | 9 | Advance to knockout stage | 2–1 | — | 1–1 | 1–0 |
| 3 | (China) Beijing Guoan | 6 | 1 | 3 | 2 | 7 | 8 | −1 | 6 | | 1–1 | 2–2 | — | 2–1 |
| 4 | (Australia) Central Coast Mariners | 6 | 2 | 0 | 4 | 4 | 7 | −3 | 6 | | 0–1 | 2–1 | 1–0 | — |

Tiebreakers

- Beijing Guoan and Central Coast Mariners are tied on head-to-head record, and so are ranked by overall goal difference.

=== Group G ===
| Pos | Team | Pld | W | D | L | GF | GA | GD | Pts | Qualification | GUA | JEO | MEL | YFM |
|---|---|---|---|---|---|---|---|---|---|---|---|---|---|---|
| 1 | (China) Guangzhou Evergrande | 6 | 3 | 1 | 2 | 10 | 8 | +2 | 10 | Advance to knockout stage | — | 3–1 | 4–2 | 2–1 |
| 2 | (South Korea) Jeonbuk Hyundai Motors | 6 | 2 | 2 | 2 | 8 | 7 | +1 | 8 | Advance to knockout stage | 1–0 | — | 0–0 | 3–0 |
| 3 | (Australia) Melbourne Victory | 6 | 2 | 2 | 2 | 9 | 9 | 0 | 8 | | 2–0 | 2–2 | — | 1–0 |
| 4 | (Japan) Yokohama F. Marinos | 6 | 2 | 1 | 3 | 7 | 10 | −3 | 7 | | 1–1 | 2–1 | 3–2 | — |

Tiebreakers

- Jeonbuk Hyundai Motors and Melbourne Victory are tied on head-to-head record, and so are ranked by overall goal difference.

=== Group H ===
| Pos | Team | Pld | W | D | L | GF | GA | GD | Pts | Qualification | WSW | KAW | ULS | GUI |
|---|---|---|---|---|---|---|---|---|---|---|---|---|---|---|
| 1 | (Australia) Western Sydney Wanderers | 6 | 4 | 0 | 2 | 11 | 5 | +6 | 12 | Advance to knockout stage | — | 1–0 | 1–3 | 5–0 |
| 2 | (Japan) Kawasaki Frontale | 6 | 4 | 0 | 2 | 7 | 5 | +2 | 12 | Advance to knockout stage | 2–1 | — | 3–1 | 1–0 |
| 3 | (South Korea) Ulsan Hyundai | 6 | 2 | 1 | 3 | 8 | 10 | −2 | 7 | | 0–2 | 2–0 | — | 1–1 |
| 4 | (China) Guizhou Renhe | 6 | 1 | 1 | 4 | 4 | 10 | −6 | 4 | | 0–1 | 0–1 | 3–1 | — |

Tiebreakers

- Western Sydney Wanderers and Kawasaki Frontale are tied on head-to-head record, and so are ranked by overall goal difference.

== Knockout stage ==
In the knock-out stage, the 16 teams played a single-elimination tournament, with the teams split between the two zones until the final. Each tie was played on a home-and-away two-legged basis. The away goals rule, extra time (away goals do not apply in extra time) and penalty shoot-out were used to decide the winner if necessary.

=== Bracket ===
Round of 16
(South Korea) Jeonbuk Hyundai Motors | 1 | 0 | 1
(South Korea) Pohang Steelers | 2 | 1 | 3
(Japan) Kawasaki Frontale | 2 | 2 | 4
(South Korea) FC Seoul (a) | 3 | 1 | 4
(Japan) Sanfrecce Hiroshima | 3 | 0 | 3
(Australia) Western Sydney Wanderers (a) | 1 | 2 | 3
(Japan) Cerezo Osaka | 1 | 1 | 2
(China) Guangzhou Evergrande | 5 | 0 | 5
(Uzbekistan) Bunyodkor | 0 | 0 | 0
(Saudi Arabia) Al-Hilal | 1 | 3 | 4
(Qatar) Al-Sadd (a) | 0 | 2 | 2
(Iran) Foolad | 0 | 2 | 2
(United Arab Emirates) Al-Jazira | 1 | 1 | 2
(United Arab Emirates) Al-Ain | 2 | 2 | 4
(Saudi Arabia) Al-Ittihad | 1 | 3 | 4
(Saudi Arabia) Al-Shabab | 0 | 1 | 1

Quarter-finals
(South Korea) Pohang Steelers | 0 | 0 | 0 (0)
(South Korea) FC Seoul (p) | 0 | 0 | 0 (3)
(Australia) Western Sydney Wanderers (a) | 1 | 1 | 2
(China) Guangzhou Evergrande | 0 | 2 | 2
(Saudi Arabia) Al-Hilal | 1 | 0 | 1
(Qatar) Al-Sadd | 0 | 0 | 0
(United Arab Emirates) Al-Ain | 2 | 3 | 5
(Saudi Arabia) Al-Ittihad | 0 | 1 | 1

Semi-finals
(South Korea) FC Seoul | 0 | 0 | 0
(Australia) Western Sydney Wanderers | 0 | 2 | 2
(Saudi Arabia) Al-Hilal | 3 | 1 | 4
(United Arab Emirates) Al-Ain | 0 | 2 | 2

Final
(Australia) Western Sydney Wanderers | 1 | 0 | 1
(Saudi Arabia) Al-Hilal | 0 | 0 | 0

=== Round of 16 ===
In the round of 16, the winners of one group played the runners-up of another group in the same zone, with the group winners hosting the second leg.

West Zone
| Team 1 | Agg. | Team 2 | 1st leg | 2nd leg |
|---|---|---|---|---|
| Al-Ittihad (Saudi Arabia) | 4–1 | (Saudi Arabia) Al-Shabab | 1–0 | 3–1 |
| Al-Jazira (United Arab Emirates) | 2–4 | (United Arab Emirates) Al-Ain | 1–2 | 1–2 |
| Al-Sadd (Qatar) | 2–2 (a) | (Iran) Foolad | 0–0 | 2–2 |
| Bunyodkor (Uzbekistan) | 0–4 | (Saudi Arabia) Al-Hilal | 0–1 | 0–3 |

East Zone
| Team 1 | Agg. | Team 2 | 1st leg | 2nd leg |
|---|---|---|---|---|
| Jeonbuk Hyundai Motors (South Korea) | 1–3 | (South Korea) Pohang Steelers | 1–2 | 0–1 |
| Cerezo Osaka (Japan) | 2–5 | (China) Guangzhou Evergrande | 1–5 | 1–0 |
| Kawasaki Frontale (Japan) | 4–4 (a) | (South Korea) FC Seoul | 2–3 | 2–1 |
| Sanfrecce Hiroshima (Japan) | 3–3 (a) | (Australia) Western Sydney Wanderers | 3–1 | 0–2 |

=== Quarter-finals ===
The draw for the quarter-finals was held on 28 May 2014. The "country protection" rule was not applied, so teams from the same association could be drawn into the same tie.

West Zone
| Team 1 | Agg. | Team 2 | 1st leg | 2nd leg |
|---|---|---|---|---|
| Al-Hilal (Saudi Arabia) | 1–0 | (Qatar) Al-Sadd | 1–0 | 0–0 |
| Al-Ain (United Arab Emirates) | 5–1 | (Saudi Arabia) Al-Ittihad | 2–0 | 3–1 |

East Zone
| Team 1 | Agg. | Team 2 | 1st leg | 2nd leg |
|---|---|---|---|---|
| Pohang Steelers (South Korea) | 0–0 (a.e.t.) (0–3p) | (South Korea) FC Seoul | 0–0 | 0–0 (a.e.t.) |
| Western Sydney Wanderers (Australia) | 2–2 (a) | (China) Guangzhou Evergrande | 1–0 | 1–2 |

=== Semi-finals ===
West Zone
| Team 1 | Agg. | Team 2 | 1st leg | 2nd leg |
|---|---|---|---|---|
| Al-Hilal (Saudi Arabia) | 4–2 | (United Arab Emirates) Al-Ain | 3–0 | 1–2 |

East Zone
| Team 1 | Agg. | Team 2 | 1st leg | 2nd leg |
|---|---|---|---|---|
| FC Seoul (South Korea) | 0–2 | (Australia) Western Sydney Wanderers | 0–0 | 0–2 |

=== Final ===
The draw to decide the order of two legs of the final was held after the quarter-final draw.

25 October 2014
19:30 UTC+11

| Western Sydney Wanderers (Australia) | 1–0 | (Saudi Arabia) Al-Hilal |
|---|---|---|
| Juric 64' | Report |

Parramatta Stadium, Sydney
Attendance: 20,053
Referee: Alireza Faghani (Iran)
1 November 2014
20:30 UTC+3

| Al-Hilal (Saudi Arabia) | 0–0 | (Australia) Western Sydney Wanderers |
|---|---|---|
| | Report |

King Fahd International Stadium, Riyadh
Attendance: 63,763
Referee: Yuichi Nishimura (Japan)

Western Sydney Wanderers won 1–0 on aggregate.

== Awards ==
| Award | Player | Team |
|---|---|---|
| Most Valuable Player | (Australia) Ante Covic | (Australia) Western Sydney Wanderers |
| Top Goalscorer | (Ghana) Asamoah Gyan | (United Arab Emirates) Al-Ain |
| Fair Play Award | — | (Saudi Arabia) Al-Hilal |

AFC Champions League 2014 Dream Team
Starting XI
| Pos. | Player | Team |
|---|---|---|
| GK | (Australia) Ante Covic | (Australia) Western Sydney Wanderers |
| DF | (Australia) Shannon Cole | (Australia) Western Sydney Wanderers |
| DF | (Australia) Nikolai Topor-Stanley | (Australia) Western Sydney Wanderers |
| DF | (South Korea) Kwak Tae-Hwi | (Saudi Arabia) Al-Hilal |
| DF | (Saudi Arabia) Abdullah Al-Zori | (Saudi Arabia) Al-Hilal |
| MF | (Algeria) Nadir Belhadj | (Qatar) Al-Sadd |
| MF | (United Arab Emirates) Omar Abdulrahman | (United Arab Emirates) Al-Ain |
| MF | (Brazil) Thiago Neves | (Saudi Arabia) Al-Hilal |
| MF | (Brazil) Elkeson | (China) Guangzhou Evergrande |
| FW | (Ghana) Asamoah Gyan | (United Arab Emirates) Al-Ain |
| FW | (Saudi Arabia) Nasser Al-Shamrani | (Saudi Arabia) Al-Hilal |
Substitutes
| GK | (Saudi Arabia) Abdullah Al-Sudairy | (Saudi Arabia) Al-Hilal |
| DF | (South Korea) Kim Ju-Young | (South Korea) FC Seoul |
| DF | (South Korea) Cha Du-Ri | (South Korea) FC Seoul |
| MF | (South Korea) Lee Myung-Joo | (United Arab Emirates) Al-Ain |
| MF | (South Korea) Yun Il-Lok | (South Korea) FC Seoul |
| FW | (Australia) Tomi Juric | (Australia) Western Sydney Wanderers |

== Top scorers ==
| Rank | Player | Team | MD1 | MD2 | MD3 | MD4 | MD5 | MD6 | 2R1 | 2R2 | QF1 | QF2 | SF1 | SF2 | F1 | F2 | Total |
|---|---|---|---|---|---|---|---|---|---|---|---|---|---|---|---|---|---|
| 1 | (Ghana) Asamoah Gyan | (United Arab Emirates) Al-Ain | 1 | 1 | 2 | 1 | 2 | | 1 | 2 | 1 | 1 | | | | | 12 |
| 2 | (Saudi Arabia) Nasser Al-Shamrani | (Saudi Arabia) Al-Hilal | 2 | | | 3 | | 1 | | 1 | | | 2 | 1 | | | 10 |
| 3 | (Brazil) Elkeson | (China) Guangzhou Evergrande | 1 | | | | | 2 | 2 | | | 1 | | | | | 6 |
| 3 | (Saudi Arabia) Mokhtar Fallatah | (Saudi Arabia) Al-Ittihad | | 2 | | 1 | 1 | | 1 | 1 | | | | | | | 6 |
| 3 | (Brazil) Luciano | (Iran) Foolad | | | | | 1 | 3 | | 2 | | | | | | | 6 |
| 6 | (South Korea) Kim Seung-dae | (South Korea) Pohang Steelers | | 1 | 1 | 1 | 1 | | | 1 | | | | | | | 5 |
| 6 | (Brazil) Vágner Love | (China) Shandong Luneng Taishan | | 2 | 2 | | | 1 | | | | | | | | | 5 |
| 8 | (Morocco) Abdelaziz Barrada | (United Arab Emirates) Al-Jazira | 1 | | 2 | | 1 | | | | | | | | | | 4 |
| 8 | (Algeria) Nadir Belhadj | (Qatar) Al-Sadd | 1 | 1 | 1 | | | | | 1 | | | | | | | 4 |
| 8 | (Australia) Tomi Juric | (Australia) Western Sydney Wanderers | | | | | | | 1 | | 1 | 1 | | | 1 | | 4 |
| 8 | (Japan) Yoichiro Kakitani | (Japan) Cerezo Osaka | 1 | 1 | 1 | | | 1 | | | | | | | | | 4 |
| 8 | (Brazil) Thiago Neves | (Saudi Arabia) Al-Hilal | | 1 | 2 | | | | | | | | 1 | | | | 4 |
| 8 | (Brazil) Nilmar | (Qatar) El Jaish | | 2 | | 1 | 1 | | | | | | | | | | 4 |
| 8 | (Iran) Mehdi Sharifi | (Iran) Sepahan | 1 | 1 | | | 2 | | | | | | | | | | 4 |
| 8 | (Nigeria) Kalu Uche | (Qatar) Al-Rayyan | 1 | 1 | 2 | | | | | | | | | | | | 4 |

Note: Goals scored in qualifying play-off not counted (see regulations, Article 74c).

== See also ==
- 2014 AFC Cup
- 2014 AFC President's Cup
- 2014 FIFA Club World Cup
