= Sayaf Al-Korbi =

Qatari footballer (born 1991)

Sayaf Al Korbi
Personal information
- Full name: Sayaf Mohsin Al Korbi
- Date of birth: 14 September 1991 (age 35)
- Height: 1.60 m (5 ft 3 in)
- Position: Midfielder

Senior career*
Years	Team	Apps	(Gls)
2008–2016	Al Rayyan	39	(1)
2015–2016	→ Al-Sailiya SC (loan)	13	(2)
2016–2019	Al-Sailiya SC	22	(2)
2017	→El Jaish (Loan)	2	(0)
2019–2022	Al Kharaitiyat		
- * Club domestic league appearances and goals

Sayaf Al Korbi (Arabic:سياف الكربي; born 14 September 1991) is a Qatari footballer who currently plays as a midfielder . He is a graduate of Qatar's Aspire Academy.
