= Banjar Al-Dosari =

Qatari football referee

Banjar Al Dosari
- Full name: Banjar Mohammed Al Dosari
- Born: 8 August 1981 (age 45); Qatar

International
| Years | League | Role |
| 2008-2016 | FIFA | Referee |

Banjar Mohammed Al Dosari (born 8 August 1981) is a Qatari football referee who has been a full international referee for FIFA.

Al Dosari was a FIFA referee from 2008 to 2016. He has served as a referee at competitions including the 2014 FIFA World Cup qualifiers, beginning with the preliminary-round match between Palestine and Afghanistan.
