= Kim Seung-dae =

South Korean footballer (born 1991)

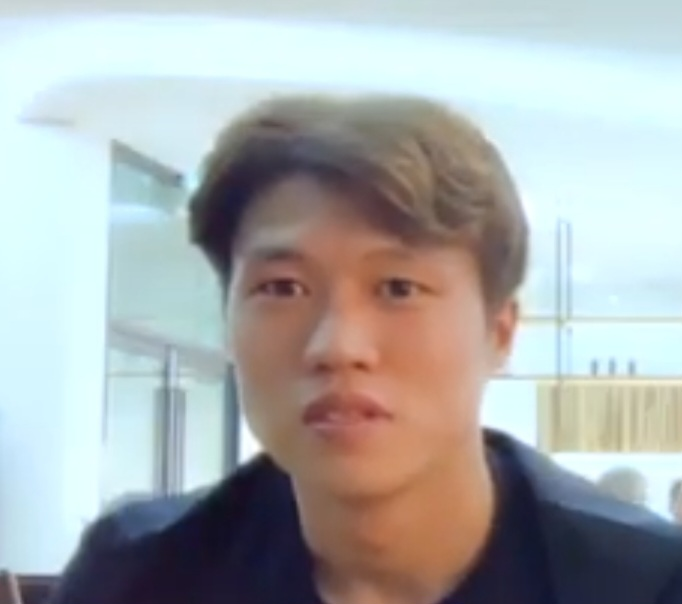

Personal information
- Date of birth: 1 April 1991 (age 35)
- Place of birth: Pohang, Gyeongbuk, South Korea
- Height: 1.76 m (5 ft 9 1/2 in)
- Positions: Forward; attacking midfielder

Team information
- Current team: Daejeon Hana Citizen
- Number: 12

Youth career
- 2007–2009: Pohang Jecheol High School
- 2010–2012: Youngnam University

Senior career*
Years	Team	Apps	(Gls)
2013–2015	Pohang Steelers	85	(21)
2016–2017	Yanbian Funde	36	(9)
2017–2019	Pohang Steelers	69	(13)
2019–2022	Jeonbuk Hyundai Motors	32	(1)
2020	→ Gangwon FC (loan)	22	(2)
2022–2024	Pohang Steelers	62	(9)
2024–	Daejeon Hana Citizen	30	(2)

International career^{‡}
2010	South Korea U-20	2	(0)
2014	South Korea U-23	8	(4)
2015–	South Korea	6	(1)
Medal record
Representing South Korea
Asian Games
Gold medal – first place	2014 Incheon	Team
- * Club domestic league appearances and goals as of 5 January 2026 ‡ National team caps and goals as of 11 December 2019

- Kim Seung-dae
- Hangul: 김승대
- Hanja: 金承大
- RR: Gim Seungdae
- MR: Kim Sŭngdae

Kim Seung-dae (Korean: 김승대; born 1 April 1991) is a South Korean footballer who plays as forward for Daejeon Hana Citizen.

== Career ==
Kim joined Pohang Steelers before the start of the 2013 season and scored his debut goal in the 2013 Korean FA Cup finals against Jeonbuk Hyundai Motors. He played in the 2014 Asian Games where the South Korea U-23 national team won gold on home soil.

== Career statistics ==
=== Club ===
As of 24 November 2024

Club	Season	League			Cup		Continental		Total	
Club	Season	Division	Apps	Goals	Apps	Goals	Apps	Goals	Apps	Goals
Pohang Steelers	2013	K League 1	21	3	3	1	2	0	26	4
Pohang Steelers	2014	K League 1	30	10	2	0	8	5	40	15
Pohang Steelers	2015	K League 1	34	8	3	0	—		37	8
Pohang Steelers	total		85	21	8	1	10	5	103	27
Yanbian Funde	2016	Chinese Super League	30	8	0	0	—		30	8
Yanbian Funde	2017	Chinese Super League	6	1	0	0	—		6	1
Yanbian Funde	total		36	9	0	0	—		36	9
Pohang Steelers	2017	K League 1	11	2	0	0	—		11	2
Pohang Steelers	2018	K League 1	38	8	0	0	—		38	8
Pohang Steelers	2019	K League 1	20	3	0	0	—		20	3
Pohang Steelers	total		69	13	0	0	—		69	13
Jeonbuk Hyundai Motors	2019	K League 1	11	1	0	0	—		11	1
Jeonbuk Hyundai Motors	2021	K League 1	20	0	1	0	5	1	26	1
Jeonbuk Hyundai Motors	2022	K League 1	1	0	0	0	0	0	1	0
Jeonbuk Hyundai Motors	total		32	1	1	0	5	1	38	2
Gangwon FC (loan)	2020	K League 1	22	2	1	0	—		23	2
Pohang Steelers	2022	K League 1	27	6	1	0	—		28	6
Pohang Steelers	2023	K League 1	35	3	4	0	5	0	44	3
Pohang Steelers	total		62	9	5	0	5	0	72	9
Daejeon Hana Citizen	2024	K League 1	26	2	0	0	—		26	2
Career total			332	57	15	1	20	6	367	64

=== International goals ===
No.	Date	Venue	Opponent	Score	Result	Competition
1	2 August 2015	Wuhan Sports Center Stadium, Wuhan, China	China	1–0	2–0	2015 EAFF East Asian Cup

== Honours ==
=== Club ===
Pohang Steelers

- K League 1 : 2013
- Korean FA Cup : 2013

Jeonbuk Hyundai Motors

- K League 1 : 2019

=== International ===
South Korea

- EAFF East Asian Cup : 2015, 2019

South Korea U23

- Asian Games Gold Medal: 2014

=== Individual ===
- K-League Rookie of the Year Award: 2014
