= Abdullah Al Hilali =

Omani football referee

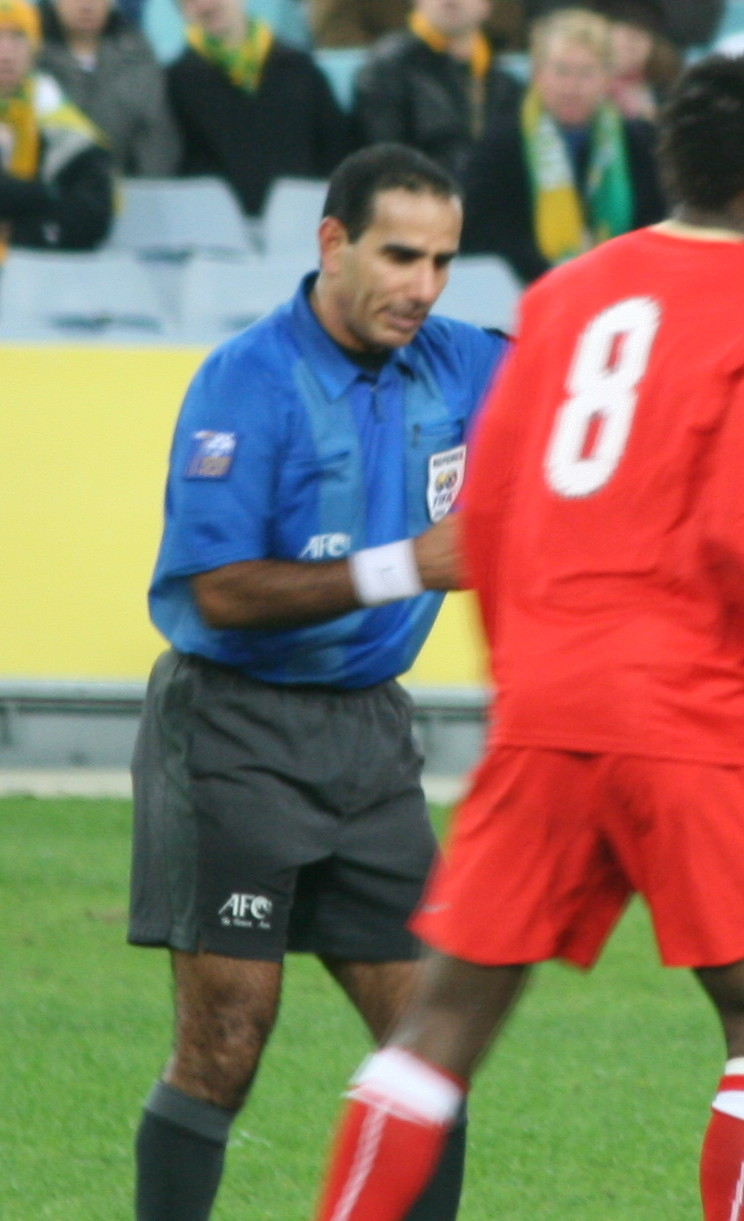
- Full name: Abdullah Mohamed Al Hilali
- Born: January 1, 1970 (age 56); Nakhal, Oman
- Other occupation: Soldier (former)

International
Years	League	Role
2002-	AFC Champions League, 2008 Summer Olympics, FIFA World Cup	Referee

Abdullah Al Hilali (born January 1, 1970) is an Omani association football referee for FIFA, and the Asian Football Confederation. He has performed at many international football competitions since 2002 including the 2008 Summer Olympics, the AFC Champions League 2009 and the World Cup 2010 qualifiers.

A former soldier in the Omani army, in 2008 Al Hilali became the first Omani to officiate at the Olympic Games in Beijing. During the Beijing Olympics he officiated the Men's First Round Group A match between Argentina and Serbia during which he sent off Duško Tošić. In 2006, he was one of the referees for the AFC Youth Championship 2006 held in India.

Al Hilali is named as one of 54 candidates to officiate the 2010 World Cup. On January 28, 2009 Al Hilali was the referee for the Yemen-Hong Kong qualifier for the 2011 AFC Asian Cup qualification. On June 10, 2009 he was the referee for the Australia-Bahrain world cup qualifiers.

He resides in Nakhal.
