= Mohamed Al-Zarouni =

Emirati football referee (born 1972)

Mohamed Al Zarouni
- Full name: Mohamed Abdelkarim Mohamed Ismail Al Zarouni
- Born: 6 February 1972 (age 54); United Arab Emirates

International
Years	League	Role
2002 -	FIFA	Referee

Mohamed Abdelkarim Mohamed Ismail Al Zarouni (Arabic: محمد عبدالكريم محمد إسماعيل الزرعوني; born 6 February 1972) is an Emirati football referee who has been a full international referee for FIFA.

Al Zarouni became a FIFA referee in 2002. He has served as a referee in competitions including the AFC Champions League and 2014 FIFA World Cup qualifiers, beginning with the match between Bahrain and Qatar.

Al Zarouni has also officiated matches in regional competitions like the UAE Pro League.
