= Abdulrahman Abdou =

Qatari football referee

- Full name: Abdulrahman Mohammed Hussain
- Born: October 1, 1972 (age 54)

International
| Years | League | Role |
| 2005-2016 | FIFA listed | Referee |

Abdulrahman Mohammed Hussain (Arabic: عبد الرحمن عبدو, born 1 October 1972) is a Qatari football referee. He was a referee at the 2007 and 2011 AFC Asian Cup and also the AFC Champions League.
