= 2011–12 Zob Ahan F.C. season =

Zob Ahan Isfahan FC
2015–16 season
- Chairman: Mohammad Asghari
- Manager: Mansour Ebrahimzadeh
- Stadium: Foolad Shahr Stadium, Fooladshahr
- IPL: 6th
- Hazfi Cup: Round of 32
- AFC Champions League: 2011: Quarter Final; 2012: Group stage
- Highest home attendance: 21.000 v Tractor Sazi (7 August 2011)
- Lowest home attendance: 980 v Mes Sarcheshmeh
Home colours	Away colours	Third colours

The 2011–12 season was Zob Ahan Football Club's 11th season in the Iran Pro League, and their 16th consecutive season in the top division of Iranian football. They also competed in the Hazfi Cup, and AFC Champions League, and had their 42nd year in existence as a football club.

== Player ==
=== First team squad ===
As of 2 August 2011.

Out for Injuries	Released – Retired

No.	Name	Nationality	Position (s)	Date of birth (age)	Signed from
Goalkeepers
1	Shahab Gordan	(Iran)	GK	May 22, 1984 (aged 27)	(Iran) Aboomoslem
~~12~~	~~Abbas Ghasemi~~	(Iran)	~~GK~~	~~October 23, 1982 (aged 28)~~	~~(Youth system)~~
22	Mohammad Bagher Sadeghi	(Iran)	GK	April 1, 1989 (aged 22)	(Youth system)
33	Hamid Reza Bajlavand	(Iran)	GK	October 8, 1985 (aged 25)	(Youth system)
Defenders
2	Mohammad Hosseini	(Iran)	DF	June 22, 1979 (aged 32)	(Iran) Aboomoslem
4	Farshid Talebi	(Iran)	DF	August 24, 1981 (aged 29)	(Iran) Fajr Sepasi
5	Mohammad-Ali Ahmadi	(Iran)	DF	June 24, 1983 (aged 28)	(Youth system)
7	Mohammad Salsali	(Iran)	DF	August 28, 1983 (aged 27)	(Youth system) (Iran) Aboomoslem
13	Hamid Parvar	(Iran)	DF	September 12, 1989 (aged 21)	(Youth system)
20	Hossein Mahini	(Iran)	RB, LB	September 16, 1986 (aged 24)	(Iran) Esteghlal Ahvaz
27	Ali Goudarzi	(Iran)	DF	March 8, 1992 (aged 19)	(Youth system)
28	Iman Shirazi	(Iran)	DF	March 10, 1992 (aged 19)	(Youth system)
34	Hamid Shafaat	(Iran)	DF	November 3, 1984 (aged 26)	(Youth system)
Midfielders
3	Felipe Alves de Souza	(Brazil)	DM, CM	June 1, 1981 (aged 30)	(Iran) Esteghlal
6	Majid Noormohammadi	(Iran)	MF	September 16, 1978 (aged 32)	(Iran) Rah Ahan
8	Ghasem Hadadifar	(Iran)	MF	July 12, 1983 (aged 28)	(Youth system)
9	Hawar	(Iraq)	LW, LM	June 1, 1981 (aged 30)	(Iran) Esteghlal
16	Hugo Machado	(Portugal)	MF	July 4, 1982 (aged 29)	(Portugal) Naval
17	Sina Ashouri	(Iran)	DM	September 16, 1988 (aged 22)	(Youth system)
21	Omid Abolhassani	(Iran)	MF, ST	September 20, 1988 (aged 22)	(Youth system) (Iran) PAS Hamedan
23	Ahmad Mohammadpour	(Iran)	MF	February 1, 1980 (aged 31)	(Iran) Sepahan
24	Alireza Hadadifar	(Iran)	MF	August 6, 1987 (aged 23)	(Youth system)
26	Payam Sadeghian	(Iran)	MF	February 29, 1992 (aged 19)	(Youth system)
37	Alireza Asgari	(Iran)	MF	January 8, 1992 (aged 19)	(Youth system)
Forwards
10	Esmaeil Farhadi	(Iran)	ST	July 26, 1982 (aged 29)	(Iran) Polyacryl Esfahan
11	Mohammad Ghazi	(Iran)	ST	December 30, 1984 (aged 26)	(Iran) Foolad
15	Igor	(Brazil)	ST	August 25, 1981 (aged 29)	(Brazil) Coritiba
40	Mohammad Ahmadpouri	(Iran)	ST	November 21, 1979 (aged 31)	(Iran) Tractor Sazi

=== Iran Pro League squad ===
As of 16 June 2011

Note: Flags indicate national team as defined under FIFA eligibility rules; some limited exceptions apply. Players may hold more than one non-FIFA nationality.

No.	Pos.	Nation	Player
1	GK	IRI	Shahab Gordan
2	DF	IRI	Seyed Mohammad Hosseini
3	MF	BRA	Felipe Alves de Souza
4	DF	IRI	Farshid Talebi
5	DF	IRI	Mohamad Ali Ahmadi
6	MF	IRI	Davoud Haghi
7	DF	IRI	Mohammad Salsali (Captain)
8	MF	IRI	Ghasem Hadadifar (Vice-Captain)
9	MF	IRQ	Hawar Mulla Mohammed
10	FW	IRI	Esmaeil Farhadi
11	FW	IRI	Mohammad Ghazi
12	GK	IRI	Abbas Ghasemi
13	DF	IRI	Hamid Parvar
15	FW	BRA	Igor Castro

No.	Pos.	Nation	Player
16	MF	POR	Hugo Machado
17	MF	IRI	Sina Ashouri
20	DF	IRI	Hossein Mahini
21	MF	IRI	Omid Abolhassani
22	GK	IRI	Mohammad Bagher Sadeghi
23	MF	IRI	Ahmad Mohammadpour
24	MF	IRI	Alireza Hadadifar
26	MF	IRI	Payam Sadeghian
27	DF	IRI	Ali Goudarzi
28	DF	IRI	Iman Shirazi
33	GK	IRI	Hamid Reza Bajlavand
34	DF	IRI	Hamid Shafaat
37	MF	IRI	Alireza Asgari
40	FW	IRI	Mohammad Ahmadpouri

For recent transfers, see List of Iranian football transfers, summer 2011.

== Transfers ==
Confirmed transfers 2011–12

=== Summer ===
In: Note: Flags indicate national team as defined under FIFA eligibility rules; some limited exceptions apply. Players may hold more than one non-FIFA nationality.

No.	Pos.	Nation	Player
—	FW	IRI	Mohammad Ahmadpouri (from Shahin Bushehr)
6	MF	IRI	Davoud Haghi (from Saba Qom)
3	MF	BRA	Felipe Alves de Souza (from Esteghlal)
16	MF	POR	Hugo Machado (from (Portugal) Naval)
9	MF	IRQ	Hawar Mulla Mohammed (from Esteghlal)

Out: Note: Flags indicate national team as defined under FIFA eligibility rules; some limited exceptions apply. Players may hold more than one non-FIFA nationality.

No.	Pos.	Nation	Player
9	MF	IRI	Mohammad Reza Khalatbari (to (Qatar) Al Gharafa)
30	MF	IRI	Mehdi Rajabzadeh (to Fajr Sepasi)
14	MF	IRI	Jalal Rafkhaei (to Malavan)
6	MF	IRI	Majid Noormohammadi (to Aluminium Hormozgan)

== Competitions ==
Competition	Started round	Current position / round	Final position / round	First match	Last match
2011–12 Persian Gulf Cup	—	—	6th	2 August 2011	11 May 2012
AFC Champions League	—	—		6 or 7 March 2012	
2011–12 Hazfi Cup	—	—			

Updated to match played 14 October 2011
Source: Competitions

=== Iran Pro League ===
==== Standings ====
Pos	Team	Pld	W	D	L	GF	GA	GD	Pts	Qualification or relegation
4	Saba Qom	34	12	14	8	40	38	+2	50	Qualification for the 2013 AFC Champions League qualifying play-off
5	Naft Tehran	34	13	10	11	36	38	−2	49	
6	Zob Ahan	34	9	18	7	29	33	−4	45	
7	Damash	34	11	11	12	34	38	−4	44	
8	Saipa	34	10	13	11	50	39	+11	43	

Updated to match(es) played on 11 May 2012. Source: varzesh3.com
Rules for classification: 1) points; 2) goal difference; 3) number of goals scored.

==== Results summary ====
Overall								Home						Away					
Pld	W	D	L	GF	GA	GD	Pts	W	D	L	GF	GA	GD	W	D	L	GF	GA	GD
33	8	17	8	29	31	−2	41	4	7	6	13	19	−6	4	10	2	16	12	+4

Last updated: 6 May 2012.
Source: Ipl Stats

==== Results by round ====
Round	1	2	3	4	5	6	7	8	9	10	11	12	13	14	15	16	17	18	19	20	21	22	23	24	25	26	27	28	29	30	31	32	33	34
Ground	A	H	A	H	A	H	A	H	A	A	H	A	H	A	H	A	H	H	A	H	A	H	A	H	A	A	H	A	H	A	H	A	H	A
Result	D	L	W	W	D	D	D	D	W	W	L	D	L	D	D	D	W	L	L	L	W	D	D	W	D	W	W	D	D	D	D	D	D	L
Position	4	17	9	5	7	4	7	6	6	6	6	6	6	6	6	6	6	6	6	6	6	6	6	6	6	6	6	6	6	6	6	6	6	6

Updated to match(es) played on 6 May 2012. Source: "Ipl".
A = Away; H = Home; W = Win; D = Draw; L = Loss

==== Matches ====
Win Draw Loss

August 2, 2011 1	Rah Ahan	2–2	Zob Ahan	Rey
22:00 UTC+04:30	Alishah 60'; Abbasfard 90'; Alishah (yellow card); Kaebi (yellow card)	Report	Own goal 15'; Castro 83'; Haghi (yellow card); Castro (yellow card)	Stadium: Rah Ahan Stadium; Attendance: 30.000; Referee: Saeed Mozafarizadeh

August 7, 2011 2	Zob Ahan	0–1	Tractor Sazi	Isfahan
22:00 UTC+04:30	Ghazi (yellow card)	Report	Arifi 36'; Hosseini (yellow card); Sadeghi (yellow card)	Stadium: Foolad Shahr Stadium; Attendance: 22.000; Referee: Mahmoud Rafiei

August 11, 2011 3	Saipa	0–1	Zob Ahan	Karaj
22:00 UTC+04:30	Mansouri (yellow card); Ghorbani (yellow card)	Report	Ghazi 85'	Stadium: Enghelab Stadium; Attendance: 2.000; Referee: Ghasem Vahedi

August 16, 2011 4	Zob Ahan	1–0	Foolad	Isfahan
22:00 UTC+04:30	Hosseini 73' de Souza (yellow card); Castro (yellow card)	Report	Norouzi (penalty missed); Afshin (yellow card); Soroush Rafaei (yellow card)	Stadium: Foolad Shahr Stadium; Attendance: 20.178; Referee: Alireza Faghani

August 23, 2011 5	Malavan	3–3	Zob Ahan	Anzali
22:00 UTC+04:30	Rafkhaei 23'; Rafkhaei (penalty scored); Rafkhaei (penalty scored); Rafkhaei (yellow card); Heidari (yellow card); Jarahkar (yellow card)	Report	Sadeghian 22'; Machado 46'; Castro 72'; Ashouri (red card); Sadeghian (yellow card); Mahini (yellow card); Ahmadi (yellow card)	Stadium: Takhti Stadium; Attendance: 15.000; Referee: Mohsen Ghahremani

September 10, 2011 6	Zob Ahan	2–2	Persepolis	Isfahan
20:00 UTC+04:30	Farhadi 2'; Machado 79'	Report	Karimi 49'; Noormohammadi 52'	Stadium: Foolad Shahr Stadium; Attendance: 9,679; Referee: Mahmoud Rafee

September 17, 2011 7	Shahin Bushehr	1–1	Zob Ahan	Bushehr
20:30 UTC+04:30	Noori 62'	Repor	Ahmadpouri 74'; Mahini (yellow card); Ahmadi (yellow card)	Stadium: Shahid Beheshti Stadium; Attendance: 8,111; Referee: Alireza Faghani

October 17, 2011 8	Zob Ahan	1–0	Mes Sarcheshmeh	Isfahan
17:45 UTC+4:30	Hawar Mulla Mohammed 77'	Summary		Stadium: Foolad Shahr Stadium; Attendance: 500; Referee: Alireza Faghani

October 2, 2011 9	Zob Ahan	1–1	Naft Tehran	Isfahan
21:00 UTC+4:30	Ghazi 36'; Ahmadpouri (yellow card)	Report	Zarei 67'	Stadium: Foolad Shahr Stadium; Attendance: 10,000; Referee: Mohsen Torki

October 14, 2011 10	Saba Qom	0–1	Zob Ahan	Qom
19:30 UTC+4:30	Nouri (yellow card)	Report	Castro 65'; Haghi (yellow card); Castro (yellow card); Hadadifar (yellow card)	Stadium: Yadegar-e Emam Stadium; Attendance: 1,200; Referee: Ashkan Khorshidi

October 21, 2011 11	Zob Ahan	0–2	Esteghlal	Isfahan
18:45	Mahini (yellow card); Hadadifar (yellow card)	Summary	Omranzadeh 8'; Zandi (yellow card); Majidi (yellow card); Meydavoudi 45'	Stadium: Foolad Shahr Stadium; Attendance: 10,000; Referee: Mohsen Torki

October 30, 2011 12	Shahrdari Tabriz	0–0	Zob Ahan	Tabriz
16:40	Daghighi (yellow card); Mohammadreza Zeynalkheyri (yellow card)	Summary		Stadium: Bagh Shomal Stadium; Attendance: 1,000; Referee: G.Jabbari

November 18, 2011 13	Zob Ahan	1–3	Sanat Naft	Isfahan
15:15	Mahini 43'; Haghi (yellow card)	Summary	Founéké Sy 10', 79'; Talebi 19' (o.g.); Pachajyan (yellow card); Sharifinasab (yellow card); Navidkia (yellow card)	Stadium: Foolad Shahr Stadium; Attendance: 1,000; Referee: Yadollah Jahanbazi

November 22, 2011 14	Damash	1–1	Zob Ahan	Rasht
16:15	Zeneyedpour 58'; Gholami (yellow card)	Summary	Mahini (yellow card); Farhadi 45'; Ahmadi (yellow card)	Stadium: Dr. Azodi Stadium; Attendance: 5,000; Referee: Mahmoud Rafiei

December 3, 2011 15	Zob Ahan	1–1	Fajr Sepasi	Isfahan
16:15	Ghazi 76'	Summary	Mohammad Mehdi Nazari 90+4'	Stadium: Foolad Shahr Stadium; Attendance: 100; Referee: Mohsen Ghahremani

December 9, 2011 16	Sepahan	1–1	Zob Ahan	Isfahan
16:00	Bengar (yellow card); Januário 53'; Ebrahimi (yellow card)	Summary	Ghazi 39'; Ashouri (yellow card)	Stadium: Foolad Shahr Stadium; Attendance: 3,000; Referee: Alireza Faghani

December 15, 2011 17	Zob Ahan	1–0	Mes Kerman	Isfahan
16:00	Salsali (yellow card); Hosseini 90+3'	Summary	Salaripour (yellow card); Amraei (yellow card)	Stadium: Foolad Shahr Stadium; Attendance: 200; Referee: Reza Kermanshahi

January 5, 2012 18	Zob Ahan	0–2	Rah Ahan	Isfahan
16:00	Ahmadi (yellow card)	Summary	Alishah 42'; Karimi (yellow card); Kaebi (yellow card); Abbasfard 90'	Stadium: Foolad Shahr Stadium; Attendance: 100; Referee: Saeid Bakhshizadeh

January 10, 2012 19	Tractor Sazi	21	Zob Ahan	Tabriz
16:00	Sarlak 58'; Akbarpour 64'	Summary	Ghazi 25'; Talebi (yellow card)	Stadium: Yadegar-e Emam Stadium; Attendance: 30,000; Referee: Mohsen Torki

January 15, 2012 20	Zob Ahan	0–3	Saipa	Isfahan
16:00	Salsali (yellow card); Felipe Alves (yellow card); Sadeghian (yellow card)	Summary	Kheiri 41'; Ansarifard 49'; Manouchehri 54'	Stadium: Foolad Shahr Stadium; Attendance: 200

January 19, 2012 21	Foolad	0–1	Zob Ahan	Ahvaz
16:00	Omid Khaledi (yellow card)	Summary	Sadeghi (yellow card); Mansouri (yellow card); Igor Castro 84'; Ghazi (yellow card)	Stadium: Takhti Stadium; Attendance: 5,000; Referee: Ghasem Vahedi

January 25, 2012 22	Zob Ahan	0–0	Malavan	Isfahan
16:30		Summary	Ramezani (yellow card)	Stadium: Foolad Shahr Stadium; Attendance: 500; Referee: Mehdi Seyedali

January 29, 2012 23	Persepolis	0–0	Zob Ahan	Tehran
19:00	Norouzi (yellow card); Aliasgari (yellow card)	Summary		Stadium: Azadi Stadium; Attendance: 15,000; Referee: Mohsen Ghahremani

February 2, 2012 24	Zob Ahan	1–0	Shahin Bushehr	Isfahan
16:30	Mahini (yellow card); Talebi 90+6'	Summary	Kcira (yellow card); Pourkhosravani (yellow card); Kiani (yellow card)	Stadium: Foolad Shahr Stadium; Attendance: 350; Referee: Alborz Hajipour

February 6, 2012 25	Mes Sarcheshmeh	0–0	Zob Ahan	Kerman
16:30	Ali Khanegi (yellow card); Bajelan (yellow card); Masoud Ebrahimi (yellow card)	Summary	Ashouri (yellow card)	Stadium: Mes Sarcheshmeh Stadium; Attendance: 200; Referee: Mahmoud Rafiei

February 15, 2012 26	Naft Tehran	0–1	Zob Ahan	Rey
16:30	Khosravi (yellow card); Marco Paixão (yellow card)	Summary	Mahini (yellow card); Ashouri (yellow card); Kouroshi 75' (o.g.); Haghi (yellow card)	Stadium: Rah Ahan Stadium; Attendance: 50; Referee: Yadollah Jahanbazi

March 10, 2012 27	Zob Ahan	2–1	Saba Qom	Isfahan
17:00	Ahmadi (yellow card); Haghi (yellow card); Ghazi 61'; Mansouri (yellow card); Igor Castro (yellow card); Sadeghian 90'	Summary	Bakhtiarizadeh (yellow card); Nouri (yellow card); Enayati 63' (pen.)	Stadium: Foolad Shahr Stadium; Referee: Alireza Faghani

March 24, 2012 28	Esteghlal	2–2	Zob Ahan	Isfahan
17:00	Yousefi 64'; Sharifat (yellow card); Meydavoudi 71'	Summary	Salsali (yellow card); Mansouri 35'; Felipe Alves 56'	Stadium: Azadi Stadium; Referee: Turaj Haghverdi

April 8, 2012 29	Zob Ahan	2–2	Shahrdari Tabriz	Isfahan
16:30	Žarković 23' (o.g.); Sadeghi (yellow card); Ashouri (yellow card); Ghazi 62'; Farhadi (yellow card)	Summary	Kamyabinia (yellow card) (goal) 56'; Behnam Dadashvand (yellow card); Daghighi 87' (pen.)	Stadium: Foolad Shahr Stadium; Referee: Reza Kermanshahi

April 13, 2012 30	Sanat Naft	1–1	Zob Ahan	Abadan
17:00	Hossein Baghlani (yellow card); Koohnavard (yellow card) (goal) 53'	Summary	Shafaat (yellow card); Ahmadi 62'	Stadium: Takhti Stadium; Referee: Rahim Mehrpishe

April 22, 2012 31	Zob Ahan	0–0	Damash	Isfahan
18:00	Ashouri (yellow card); Igor Castro (yellow card)	Summary	Ali Hosseini (yellow card)	Stadium: Foolad Shahr Stadium; Referee: Shahin Haj Babaei

April 27, 2012 32	Fajr Sepasi	0–0	Zob Ahan	Shiraz
18:00		Summary		Stadium: Hafezieh Stadium; Referee: Seyed Zargar

May 6, 2012 33	Zob Ahan	0–0	Sepahan	Isfahan
18:00		Summary		Stadium: Foolad Shahr Stadium; Referee: Yadollah Jahanbazi

May 11, 2012 34	Mes Kerman	2–0	Zob Ahan	Kerman
18:00				Stadium: Shahid Bahonar Stadium

=== AFC Champions League ===
==== AFC Champions League 2011 ====
===== Quarter-finals =====
September 14, 2011 1st Leg	Suwon Samsung Bluewings	1–1	ZOB AHAN	Gyeonggi-do
19:30 UTC+09:00	Hyun-Beom 67'; Jong-Jin (yellow card); Ristić (yellow card)	Report	Ghazi 58'	Stadium: Suwon World Cup Stadium; Attendance: 20,000; Referee: Masaki

September 28, 2011 2nd Leg	ZOB AHAN	1–2 (2–3 agg.)	Suwon Samsung Bluewings	Isfahan
17:20 UTC+03:30	Ghazi 50'; Ahmadi (red card)	Report	Seng-Min 77'; Nertljak (penalty scored)	Stadium: Foolad Shahr Stadium; Attendance: 8,250; Referee: Khalil Amdi

==== Qualifying play-off ====
Win Draw Loss Postponed

February 10, 2012 Semi-final	Esteghlal (Iran)	2–0	(Iran) Zob Ahan	Tehran
17:15 UTC+03:30	Heydari 23'; Borhani 67'	Report		Stadium: Azadi Stadium; Attendance: 33,750; Referee: Minoru Tōjō (Japan)

=== Hazfi Cup ===
==== Matches ====
Win Draw Loss

===== Round of 32 =====
26 October 2011 1/32	Zob Ahan	2–1	Gostaresh Foolad	Fuladshahr
17:00		Summary		Stadium: Foolad Shahr Stadium

===== Last 16 =====
27 November 2011 1/16	Zob Ahan	2–3	Persepolis	Fuladshahr
15:30		Summary		Stadium: Foolad Shahr Stadium

=== Friendly Matches ===
Win Draw Loss

July 15, 2011 1	Zob Ahan	7–1	Zob Ahan Novin	Isfahan
20:00 UTC+04:30		Report		Stadium: Foolad Shahr Stadium; Attendance: 2.000; Referee: Ali Ramazani

== Statistics ==
=== Appearances ===
No.	Pos	Nat	Player	Total		Iran Pro League		AFC Champions League		Hazfi Cup	
No.	Pos	Nat	Player	Apps	Goals	Apps	Goals	Apps	Goals	Apps	Goals
1	GK	(Iran) IRI	Shahab Gordan	11	0	9+0	0	2+0	0	0+0	0
2	DF	(Iran) IRI	Mohammad Hosseini	9	0	7+0	0	2+0	0	0+0	0
3	MF	(Brazil) BRA	Felipe Alves de Souza	9	0	7+0	0	2+0	0	0+0	0
4	DF	(Iran) IRI	Farshid Talebi	9	0	7+0	0	2+0	0	0+0	0
5	DF	(Iran) IRI	Mohamad Ali Ahmadi	7	0	5+0	0	2+0	0	0+0	0
6	MF	(Iran) IRI	Davoud Haghi	8	0	6+0	0	2+0	0	0+0	0
7	MF	(Iran) IRI	Mohammad Salsali	7	0	5+0	0	2+0	0	0+0	0
8	DF	(Iran) IRI	Ghasem Hadadifar	4	0	4+0	0	0+0	0	0+0	0
9	MF	(Iraq) IRQ	Hawar Mulla Mohammed	8	0	6+0	0	2+0	0	0+0	0
10	FW	(Iran) IRI	Esmaeil Farhadi	9	0	7+0	0	2+0	0	0+0	0
11	FW	(Iran) IRI	Mohammad Ghazi	7	4	5+0	2	2+0	2	0+0	0
12	GK	(Iran) IRI	Abbas Ghasemi	0	0	0+0	0	0+0	0	0+0	0
13	DF	(Iran) IRI	Hamid Parvar	0	0	0+0	0	0+0	0	0+0	0
15	FW	(Brazil) BRA	Igor José Marigo de Castro	10	3	8+0	3	2+0	0	0+0	0
16	MF	(Portugal) POR	Hugo Machado	7	1	5+0	1	2+0	0	0+0	0
17	MF	(Iran) IRI	Sina Ashouri	3	0	2+0	0	1+0	0	0+0	0
20	DF	(Iran) IRI	Hossein Mahini	8	0	7+0	0	1+0	0	0+0	0
21	MF	(Iran) IRI	Omid Abolhassani	1	0	0+1	0	0+0	0	0+0	0
22	GK	(Iran) IRI	Mohammad Bagher Sadeghi	0	0	0+0	0	0+0	0	0+0	0
23	MF	(Iran) IRI	Ahmad Mohammadpour	0	0	0+0	0	0+0	0	0+0	0
24	MF	(Iran) IRI	Alireza Hadadifar	1	0	1+0	0	0+0	0	0+0	0
26	MF	(Iran) IRI	Payam Sadeghian	6	1	5+0	1	1+0	0	0+0	0
27	DF	(Iran) IRI	Ali Goudarzi	1	0	1+0	0	0+0	0	0+0	0
28	DF	(Iran) IRI	Iman Shirazi	0	0	0+0	0	0+0	0	0+0	0
33	GK	(Iran) IRI	Hamid Reza Bajlavand	0	0	0+0	0	0+0	0	0+0	0
34	DF	(Iran) IRI	Hamid Shafaat	1	0	0+1	0	0+0	0	0+0	0
37	MF	(Iran) IRI	Alireza Asgari	0	0	0+0	0	0+0	0	0+0	0
40	FW	(Iran) IRI	Mohammad Ahmadpouri	2	1	2+0	1	0+0	0	0+0	0

=== Top scorers ===
Includes all competitive matches. The list is sorted by shirt number when total goals are equal.

Last updated on 14 October 2011

Ranking	Position	Nation	Name	Pro League	Champions League	Hazfi Cup	Total
1	FW	(Iran)	Mohammad Ghazi	2	2	0	4
2	FW	(Brazil)	Igor Castro	3	0	0	3
3	MF	(Iran)	Payam Sadeghian	1	0	0	1
3	FW	(Iran)	Mohammad Hosseini	1	0	0	1
3	FW	(Portugal)	Hugo Machado	1	0	0	1
3	FW	(Iran)	Mohammad Ahmadpouri	1	0	0	1
Own goal				0	0	0	0
TOTALS				9	2	0	11

Friendlies and Pre season goals are not recognized as competitive match goals.

=== Top assistors ===
Includes all competitive matches. The list is sorted by shirt number when total assistors are equal.

Last updated on 14 October 2011

Ranking	Position	Nation	Name	Pro League	Champions League	Hazfi Cup	Total
1	FW	(Portugal)	Hugo Machado	0	2	0	2
2	FW	(Brazil)	Igor Castro	1	0	0	1
2	MF	(Iran)	Mohammad Salsali	1	0	0	1
2	MF	(Iran)	Payam Sadeghian	1	0	0	1
TOTALS				3	1	0	4

Friendlies and Pre season goals are not recognized as competitive match assist.

=== Disciplinary record ===
Includes all competitive matches. Players with 1 card or more included only.

Last updated on 14 October 2011

				Iran Pro League			AFC Champions League			Hazfi Cup			Total		
Position	Nation	Number	Name	Yellow card	(yellow card) (yellow-red card)	Red card	Yellow card	(yellow card) (yellow-red card)	Red card	Yellow card	(yellow card) (yellow-red card)	Red card	Yellow card	(yellow card) (yellow-red card)	Red card
1	(Brazil)	15	Igor Castro	3	0	0	0	0	0	0	0	0	3	0	0
2	(Iran)	6	Davoud Haghi	2	0	0	0	0	0	0	0	0	2	0	0
3
3	(Iran)	17	Sina Ashouri	0	0	1	0	0	0	0	0	0	0	0	1
3	(Iran)	7	Mohammad Ghazi	1	0	0	0	0	0	0	0	0	1	0	0
3	(Brazil)	15	Felipe Alves de Souza	1	0	0	0	0	0	0	0	0	1	0	0
3	(Iran)	20	Hossein Mahini	1	0	0	0	0	0	0	0	0	1	0	0
3	(Iran)	5	Mohamad Ali Ahmadi	1	0	0	0	0	1	0	0	0	1	0	1
3	(Iran)	30	Mohammad Ahmadpouri	1	0	0	0	0	1	0	0	0	1	0	1
3	(Iran)	8	Ghasem Haddadifar	1	0	0	0	0	1	0	0	0	1	0	1
TOTALS				11	0	0	0	0	1	0	0	0	11	0	1

=== Goals conceded ===
- Updated on 14 October 2011

Position	Nation	Number	Name	Pro League	Champions League	Hazfi Cup	Total	Minutes per goal
GK	(Iran)	1	Shahab Gordan	8	3	0	0	11
TOTALS				8	3	0	0	11

=== Own goals ===
- Updated on 14 October 2011

Position	Nation	Number	Name	Pro League	Champions League	Hazfi Cup	Total
TOTALS				0	0	0	0

== Club ==
=== Coaching staff ===
Position	Staff
Head coach	(Iran) Mansour Ebrahimzadeh
First Team coach	(Germany) Hans-Jürgen Gede
Goalkeeping coach	(Serbia) Tomislav Savic
Fitness coach	(Spain) Robberto Sakashvi
Technical manager	(Iran) Bahram Atef
Physiotherapis	(Iran) Abbas Moradi
Team doctor	(Iran) Amir Hossein Sharifianpour
Logistics	(Iran) Mahmoud Mehruyan
Director	(Iran) Ali Shojaei

=== Other information ===
Chairman	(Iran) Mohammad Asghari
Ground (capacity and dimensions)	Foolad Shahr Stadium (20,000 / )

Updated to match played 23 August 2011

== See also ==
- 2011–12 Persian Gulf Cup
- 2011–12 Hazfi Cup
- 2011 AFC Champions League
- 2012 AFC Champions League
