= 2010–11 Zob Ahan F.C. season =

Zob Ahan F.C.
2010–11 season
- Chairman: (Iran) Asghar Dalili
- Manager: (Iran) Mansour Ebrahimzadeh
- Persian Gulf League: 3rd
- Hazfi Cup: Round of 32
- Champions League: Runner-up
- Top goalscorer: Mohammad Reza Khalatbari (11)
Home colours	Away colours

This is a list of Zob Ahan F.C.'s results at the 2010–11 Persian Gulf Cup, 2010–11 Hazfi Cup and ACL 2010.

== Current squad ==
Note: Flags indicate national team as defined under FIFA eligibility rules; some limited exceptions apply. Players may hold more than one non-FIFA nationality.

No.	Pos.	Nation	Player
1	GK	IRI	Shahab Gordan
2	DF	IRI	Seyed Mohammad Hosseini
3	DF	IRI	Mohamad Ali Ahmadi
4	DF	IRI	Farshid Talebi
5	DF	IRI	Mohammad Salsali (captain)
9	MF	IRI	Mohammad Reza Khalatbari
10	FW	IRI	Esmaeil Farhadi
12	GK	IRI	Abbas Ghasemi
14	MF	IRI	Ghasem Hadadifar (vice-captain)
15	FW	BRA	Igor Castro
17	MF	IRI	Sina Ashouri
19	FW	IRI	Mohammad Ghazi
20	MF	IRI	Alireza Hadadifar
21	MF	IRI	Omid Abolhassani
22	GK	IRI	Mohammad Bagher Sadeghi

No.	Pos.	Nation	Player
23	MF	IRI	Ahmad Mohammadpour
25	DF	IRI	Hossein Mahini
26	MF	IRI	Payam Sadeghian
27	MF	IRI	Ali Goudarzi
28	MF	IRI	Iman Shirazi
29	DF	BRA	Vinicius Evandro
30	FW	IRI	Mehdi Rajabzadeh
31	MF	IRI	Shahin Kheiri
32	FW	IRI	Jalal Rafkhaei
33	GK	IRI	Hamid Reza Bajlavand
34	DF	IRI	Hamid Shafaat
35	MF	IRI	Majid Noormohammadi
36	DF	IRI	Hamid Parvar
37	MF	IRI	Alireza Asgari

== Iran Pro League ==
=== Matches ===
Win	Draw	Lose

Last updated May 20, 2011

#	Date	Home	Score	Away	Venue	Goal	Yellow card	Red card	Fans	Ref
1	26-Jul-2010	Zob Ahan	2-1	Peykan	Foolad Shahr/Esfahan	Mohammad-Reza Khalatbari 14' (pen.), 36'	Mohamad Ghazi, Mehdi Rajabzadeh, Majid Noormohammadi	Mehdi Rajabzadeh	1,000	Bakhshizadeh
2	31-Jul-2010	Mes	1-2	Zob Ahan	Shahid Bahonar/Kerman	Esmail Farhadi 10', Mohammad Ghazi 59'	Farsheed Talebi, Ghasem Haddadifar, Mohamad Reza Khalatbari, Shahin Khayri	-	3,000	Jabbari
3	05-Aug-2010	Zob Ahan	1-1	Esteghlal	Foolad Shahr/Esfahan	Mohammad Hosseini 79'	Mohamad Ali Ahmadi, Mohamad Reza Khalatbari	-	10,000	Afsharian
4	14-Aug-2010	Saipa	0-2	Zob Ahan	Enghelab/Karaj	Igor Castro 12', Mohammad Hossaini 42'	Ghasem Hadadifar	-	3.000	Torki
5	18-Sep-2010	Zob Ahan	1-0	Sepahan	Foolad Shahr/Esfahan	Mohammad Reza Khalatbari 27'	Shahabeddin Gordan	-	8,000	Moradi
6	23-Aug-2010	Sanat Naft	2-1	Zob Ahan	Takhti/Abadan	Mohammad Hossaini 10'	Shahin Khayri, Hossain Mahini	-	25,000	Jahanbazi
7	28-Aug-2010	Zob Ahan	2-1	Saba	Foolad Shahr/Esfahan	Igor Castro 66', Mohammad Hossaini 82'	Ghasem Haddadifar, Sina Ashori, Omid Abolhassani	-	3,000	Hajipour
8	10-Sep-2010	Teraktor Sazi	1-2	Zob Ahan	Yadegar Emam/Tabriz	Mohammad Hossaini 24', Mohammad Ghazi 61'	Shahin Khayri, Ahmad Mohamadpour, Mehdi Rajabzadeh, Mohamad Ali Ahmadi, Omid Abolhassani	-	70,000	Mombaini
9	29-Sep-2010	Zob Ahan	0-0	Rah Ahan	Foolad Shahr/Esfahan	-	Hossain Pashaei, Iman Razzaghirad	-	2,000	Bakhshizadeh
10	10-Oct-2010	Shahin Pars	1-1	Zob Ahan	Shahid Beheshti/Bushehr	Mehdi Rajabzadeh 45+2'	Ghasem Haddadifar	-	7,000	Haj Babaei
11	15-Oct-2010	Zob Ahan	3-0	Malavan	Foolad Shahr/Esfahan	Mohammad Hossaini 3', Jalal Rafkhaei 12', Saeed Salarzadeh 15' (o.g.)	Ghasem Haddadifar	-	1,000	Noori
12	25-Oct-2010	Perspolis	2-0	Zob Ahan	Azadi/Tehran	_	Mohamad Reza Khalatbari, Ghasem Haddadifar, Shahabeddin Gordan, Seyed Mohammad Hossaini	Mohamad Ali Ahmadi	20,000	Mozzafari Zadeh
13	30-Oct-2010	Shahrdari	1-1	Zob Ahan	Yadegar Emam/Tabriz	Mehdi Rajabzadeh 4'	Mohamad Reza Khalatbari, Mohamad Ghazi, Shahin Khayri, Hossain Mahini	-	2,000	Akbarian
14	04-Nov-2010	Zob Ahan	1-0	Pas	Foolad Shahr/Esfahan	Igor Castro 5'	Jalal Rafakhahi	_	1,000	Mehr Pisheh
15	21-Nov-2010	Foolad	1-2	Zob Ahan	Takhti/Ahvaz	Igor Castro 5', Hossain Mahini 30'	Mohammad Hossaini, Igor Castro, Farsheed Talebi	-	2,000	Jahanbazi
16	29-Nov-2010	Zob Ahan	2-0	Naft	Foolad Shahr/Esfahan	Mohammad Hossaini 49' 54'	Mohammad Hossaini, Shahin Khayri, Mohamad Ali Ahmadi	-	1,500	Ameri
17	04-Dec-2010	Steel Azin	0-2	Zob Ahan	Dastgerdi/Tehran	Mehdi Rajabzadeh 16', Mohamad Reza Khalatbari 74'	Mohamad Reza Khalatbari, Sina Ashori	-	1,000	Moradi
18	10-Dec-2010	Peykan	0-0	Zob Ahan	Shahid Rajai/Ghazvin	-	Ahmad Mohamadpour, Mohamad Ali Ahmadi	-	3,000	Asadi
20	23-Dec-2010	Esteghlal	1-2	Zob Ahan	Azadi/Tehran	Seyed Jalal Rafkhaei 63', Mohamad Reza Khalatbari 84' (pen.)	Ghasem Haddadifar, Mohamad Reza Khalatbari, Mohamad Ghazi, Mohamad Ali Ahmadi, Esmail Farhadi	-	50,000	Torki
19	31-Jan-2011	Zob Ahan	1-0	Mes	Shahid Bahonar/Kerman	Seyed Jalal Rafkhaei 90+6'	Seyed Jalal Rafkhaei	-	3,000	Bakhshizadeh
21	05-Feb-2011	Zob Ahan	0 - 2	Saipa	Foolad Shahr/Esfahan		Ansarifard 17', Manoochehri 58'		2,000	Mombeni
22	13-Feb-2011	Sepahan	2 - 0	Zob Ahan	Naghsh-i Jahan/Esfahan				10,000	Torki
23	15-Feb-2011	Zob Ahan	6 - 0	Sanat Naft	Foolad Shahr/Esfahan	Najafabadi 20'; Hosseini 26'; Rafkhaei 64'; Igor 69'; Rajabzadeh 71' (pen.); Talebi 90+1'	Hosseini, Ahmadi		2,000	Rafiei
24	20-Feb-2011	Saba	1 - 2	Zob Ahan	Qom/Qom	Rezaian 87'	Rafkhaei 90+1', Ghazi 90+2'		1,000	Mozzafari Zadeh
25	25-Feb-2011	Zob Ahan	0 - 0	Teraktor Sazi	Yadegar Emam/Tabriz			Ghasem Haddadifar	1,000	Haghverdi
26	4-Mar-2011	Rah Ahan	2 - 2	Zob Ahan	Rah Ahan/Shahr Rey	Razzaghirad 68', Aghaei 82'	Ghazi 3', Hosseini 90+2'		1,000	Afsharian
27	11-Mar-2011	Zob Ahan	2 - 1	Shahin Pars	Shahid Beheshti/Bushehr	Talebi 25', Rafkhaei 85'	Kiani 90+2' (pen.)		2,000	Afsharian
28	18-Mar-2011	Malavan	1 - 0	Zob Ahan	Takhti/Anzali	Oladi 45' (pen.)			8,000	Mombaini
29	8-Apr-2011	Zob Ahan	0 - 3	Perspolis	Foolad Shahr/Esfahan		Feshangchi 45+5', Hashemian 68', Nouri 71'		10,000	Mozzafari Zadeh
30	15-Apr-2011	Zob Ahan	2 - 1	Shahrdari	Foolad Shahr/Esfahan	Hosseini 44', Salsali 80' (pen.)		Kheiri	2,000	Vahedi
31	22-Apr-2011	Pas	2 - 1	Zob Ahan	Shahid Mofatteh/Esfahan	Aziz Mohammadi 32', Khayrkhah 57' (pen.)	Ali Ahmadi 37'		8,000	Faghani
32	29-Apr-2011	Zob Ahan	1 - 1	Foolad	Foolad Shahr/Esfahan	Rajabzadeh 68'	Dyakite 41'		3,000	Rafiei
33	13-May-2011	Naft	1 - 2	Zob Ahan	Rah Ahan/Tehran	Rajabzadeh 43', Hosseini 79'	Ganji 90+2'		1,000	Torki
34	20-May-2011	Zob Ahan	2 - 0	Steel Azin	Foolad Shahr/Esfahan	Ghazi 61', Mahini 75'			10,000	Jabbari

=== League standings ===
Pos	Team	Pld	W	D	L	GF	GA	GD	Pts	Qualification or relegation
1	Sepahan (C)	34	18	12	4	56	29	+27	66	Qualification for the 2012 AFC Champions League group stage
2	Esteghlal	34	18	11	5	55	34	+21	65	Qualification for the 2012 AFC Champions League Qualifying play-off
3	Zob Ahan	34	18	9	7	49	31	+18	63	Qualification for the 2012 AFC Champions League Qualifying play-off
4	Persepolis	34	17	7	10	50	36	+14	58	Qualification for 2012 AFC Champions League group stage (Note: Persepolis qualified to AFC Champions League group stage directly by winning the Hazfi Cup)
5	Tractor Sazi	34	15	12	7	42	29	+13	57	

Updated to match(es) played on 1 SEP 2018. Source: IPL Stats, Soccerway
Rules for classification: 1) Points; 2) Goal difference; 3) Goals scored.
(C) Champions

== Hazfi Cup ==
Last updated January 25, 2011

25 November 2010 Round of 32	Zob Ahan	0 - 1	Shahrdari Yasuj	Isfahan
18:30 (UTC+4:30)		Report	Cheraghi 120'	Stadium: Foolad Shahr Stadium; Attendance: 950; Referee: Masoud Moradi

== 2010 AFC Champions League ==
=== Quarter-finals ===
15 September 2010 1st Leg	Zob Ahan (Iran)	2 - 1	(South Korea) Pohang Steelers	Isfahan
18:30 (UTC+4:30)	Igor 18'; Rajabzadeh 76' (pen.)	Report	Mota 56'	Stadium: Foolad Shahr Stadium; Attendance: 9,156; Referee: Abdullah Al-Hilali (Oman)

22 September 2010 2nd Leg	Pohang Steelers (South Korea)	1 - 1 (2 - 3 agg.)	(Iran) Zob Ahan	Pohang
19:30 (UTC+9)	Kim Jae-Sung 10'	Report	80' Khalatbari	Stadium: Steelyard Stadium; Attendance: 8,617; Referee: Ben Williams (Australia)

=== Semi-finals ===
6 October 2010 1st Leg	Zob Ahan (Iran)	1 - 0	(South Korea) Pohang Steelers	Isfahan
17:00 (UTC+3:30)	Hadadifar 57'	Report		Stadium: Foolad Shahr Stadium; Attendance: 9,811; Referee: Subkhiddin Mohd Salleh (Malaysia)

20 October 2010 2nd Leg	Al-Hilal (Saudi Arabia)	0 – 1 (0 – 2 agg.)	(Iran) Zob Ahan	Riyadh
20:00 (UTC+3)		Report	55' Igor	Stadium: King Fahd International Stadium; Attendance: 68,752; Referee: Ravshan Irmatov (Uzbekistan)

=== Final ===
13 November 2010 Final	Seongnam Ilhwa Chunma (South Korea)	3 – 1	(Iran) Zob Ahan	Tokyo
19:00 (JST)	Saša 29'; Cho Byung-Kuk 53'; Kim Cheol-Ho 83'	Report	67' Khalatbari	Stadium: National Olympic Stadium; Attendance: 27,308; Referee: Yuichi Nishimura (Japan)

=== Statistics ===
==== Goalscorers ====
4 Goals

- (Iran) Mohammad Reza Khalatbari
- (Brazil) Igor Castro

2 Goals

- (Iran) Mohammad Ghazi

1 Goal

- (Iran) Seyed Mohammad Hosseini
- (Iran) Esmaeil Farhadi
- (Iran) Mehdi Rajabzadeh
- (Iran) Ghasem Hadadifar

==== Assists ====
3 Assistants

- (Iran) Hassan Ashjari

1 Assistant

- (Iran) Farshid Talebi
- (Iran) Ghasem Hadadifar
- (Iran) Mohammad Ghazi

==== Cards ====
Player	Yellow card	Yellow card Red card	Red card
(Iran) Seyed Mohammad Hosseini	2	0	0
(Iran) Sina Ashouri	2	0	0
(Iran) Ghasem Hadadifar	2	0	0
(Iran) Farshid Talebi	2	0	0
(Iran) Mohammad Reza Khalatbari	2	0	0
(Iran) Mohamad Ali Ahmadi	1	0	0
(Iran) Mohammad Mansouri	1	0	0
Total cards	12	0	0

== 2011 AFC Champions League ==
=== Group stage ===
Pos	Team	Pld	W	D	L	GF	GA	GD	Pts	Qualification
1	(Iran) Zob Ahan	6	4	1	1	7	3	+4	13	Advance to knockout stage
2	(Saudi Arabia) Al-Shabab	6	3	2	1	8	4	+4	11	Advance to knockout stage
3	(United Arab Emirates) Emirates	6	2	0	4	6	10	−4	6	
4	(Qatar) Al-Rayyan	6	1	1	4	4	8	−4	4	

2 March 2011 G1	Zob Ahan (Iran)	2 – 1	(United Arab Emirates) Emirates	Isfahan
18:30 UTC+03:30	Hosseini 45+1'; Igor Castro 53'	Report	39' Daoudi	Stadium: Foolad Shahr Stadium; Attendance: 3,480; Referee: Valentin Kovalenko (Uzbekistan)

16 March 2011 G2	Al-Shabab (Saudi Arabia)	0 – 0	(Iran) Zob Ahan	Riyadh
20:00 UTC+03:00		Report		Stadium: Prince Faisal bin Fahd Stadium; Attendance: 3,920; Referee: Nawaf Shukralla (Bahrain)

6 April 2011 G3	Al-Rayyan (Qatar)	1 – 3	(Iran) Zob Ahan	Al-Rayyan
18:30 UTC+03:00	Al Marri 13'	Report	11' Khalatbari; 24' Igor Castro; 71' Hadadifar	Stadium: Ahmed bin Ali Stadium; Attendance: 3,009; Referee: Andre El Haddad (Lebanon)

19 April 2011 G4	Zob Ahan (Iran)	1 – 0	(Qatar) Al-Rayyan	Isfahan
20:00 UTC+04:30	Farhadi 21'	Report		Stadium: Foolad Shahr Stadium; Attendance: 3,351; Referee: Minoru Tojo (Japan)

3 May 2011 G5	Emirates (United Arab Emirates)	0 – 1	(Iran) Zob Ahan	Ras al-Khaimah
19:35 UTC+04:00		Report	80' Ghazi	Stadium: Emirates Club Stadium; Attendance: 5,450; Referee: Abdul Malik (Singapore)

10 May 2011 G6	(Iran) Zob Ahan	0 – 1	(Saudi Arabia) Al-Shabab	Isfahan
20:30 UTC+04:30		Report	Bin Sultan 57'	Stadium: Foolad Shahr Stadium; Attendance: 4,160; Referee: Ravshan Irmatov (Uzbekistan)

=== Round of 16 ===
25 May 2011 R16	(Iran) Zob Ahan	4 – 1	(Saudi Arabia) Al-Nassr	Isfahan
19:15 UTC+04:30	Ghazi 1'; Igor Castro 5', 63'; Kheiri 74'		Al-Mutwa 66'	Stadium: Foolad Shahr Stadium; Attendance: 5,711; Referee: Ravshan Irmatov (Uzbekistan)
