= 2009 Hazfi Cup final =

- Event: 2008-09 Hazfi Cup
Rah Ahan	Zob Ahan
2	5

First leg
Rah Ahan	Zob Ahan
1	0
- Date: May 18, 2009
- Venue: Rah Ahan Stadium, Ekbatan
- Referee: Khodadad Afsharian
- Attendance: 5,000

Second leg
Zob Ahan	Rah Ahan
5	1
- Date: May 22, 2009
- Venue: Foolad Shahr Stadium, Fooladshahr
- Referee: Saeed Mozafarizadeh
- Attendance: 15,000

The 2009 Hazfi Cup final was a two-legged football tie in order to determine the 2008–09 Hazfi Cup champion of Iranian football clubs. Rah Ahan faced Zob Ahan in this final game. The first leg took place on May 18, 2009 at 17:00 local time (UTC+3:30) at Rah Ahan Stadium in Ekbatan and the second leg took place on May 22, 2009 at 17:00 local time (UTC+3:30) at Foolad Shahr Stadium, Fooladshahr.

== Format ==
The rules for the final were exactly the same as the one in the previous knockout rounds. The tie was contested over two legs with away goals deciding the winner if the two teams were level on goals after the second leg. If the teams could still not be separated at that stage, then extra time would have been played with a penalty shootout (taking place if the teams were still level after extra time).

== Route to the final ==
Rah Ahan				Round	Zob Ahan
Opponent	Result	H/A	Rah Ahan goalscorers	Second stage	Opponent	Result	H/A	Zob Ahan goalscorers
Petroshimi Tabriz	3–1	A	Sohrab Entezari, Alireza Noormohammadi, Mohsen Mirabi	1/16 Final	Shirin Faraz Kermanshah	4–1	H	Igor Castro, Hassan Ashjari (2), Mohammad Mansouri
Bargh Shiraz	4–1	H	Davoud Haghi (2), Mojtaba Zarei, Ahmad Momenzadeh	1/8 Final	Aboomoslem Mashhad	1–0	A	Mohammad Salsali
Teraktor Sazi Tabriz	1–0	A	Sohrab Entezari	Quarter-Final	Foolad Ahvaz	3–0	H	Ghasem Hadadifar (2), Mohammad Reza Khalatbari
Pas Hamedan	1–0	H	Mojtaba Zarei	Semi-Final	Saba Qom	0–0 (5-4)	A

== Final Summary ==
Team 1	Agg.	Team 2	1st leg	2nd leg
Rah Ahan	2-5	Zob Ahan	1-0	1-5

=== Leg 1 ===
May 18, 2009
17:00 (UTC+3:30)

Rah Ahan	1–0	Zob Ahan
Zarei 88'	Report

Rah Ahan Stadium, Ekbatan
Attendance: 5,000
Referee: Khodadad Afsharian

Rah Ahan:
GK	(Iran) Nader Ghobishavi
DF	(Iran) Alireza Noormohammadi
DF	(Iran) Abouzar Rahimi	Temporarily suspended
DF	(Iran) Ebrahim Karimi
DF	(Iran) Ali Mohammad Dehghan	(substituted off) 19'
MF	(Iran) Hossein Pashaei
MF	(Iran) Ahmad Taghavi	Temporarily suspended	(substituted off) 79'
MF	(Iran) Davoud Haghi
FW	(Iran) Sohrab Entezari	(substituted off) 64'
FW	11	(Iran) Mojtaba Zarei	89'
FW	(Iran) Ahmad Momenzadeh
Substitutes:
DF	(Iran) Hamed Noormohammadi	(substituted in) 19'
FW	(Iran) Amin Torkashvand	(substituted in) 79'
MF	(Armenia) Hamlet Mkhitaryan	(substituted in) 64'
Manager:
(Iran) Mehdi Tartar

Zob Ahan:
GK	1	(Senegal) Issa Ndoye
DF	(Iran) Mohammad Salsali	Temporarily suspended
DF	(Iran) Seyed Mohammad Hosseini
MF	(Iran) Hassan Ashjari
MF	(Iran) Shahin Kheiri
DF	(Iran) Farshid Talebi
MF	(Iran) Mohammad Mansouri
FW	(Iran) Mohsen Mosalman	Temporarily suspended	(substituted off) 77'
MF	14	(Iran) Ghasem Hadadifar	Temporarily suspended	(substituted off) 91+1'
FW	10	(Iran) Esmaeil Farhadi	(substituted off) 88'
FW	15	(Brazil) Igor José Marigo de Castro
Substitutes:
(Iran) Majid Bajelan	(substituted in) 77'
MF	(Iran) Sina Ashouri	(substituted in) 90+1'
MF	(Iran) Mostafa Salehi Nejad	(substituted in) 88'
Manager:
(Iran) Mansour Ebrahimzadeh

=== Leg 2 ===
May 22, 2009
17:00 (UTC+3:30)

Zob Ahan	5–1	Rah Ahan
Kheiri 20'; Farhadi 31'; Hadadifar 46' 90'; Salehi Nejad 95'	Report	Zarei 37'

Foolad Shahr Stadium, Fooladshahr
Attendance: 15,000
Referee: Saeed Mozafarizadeh

Zob Ahan:
GK	1	(Senegal) Issa Ndoye
DF		(Iran) Seyed Mohammad Hosseini
DF		(Iran) Mohammad Salsali
DF		(Iran) Farshid Talebi
MF		(Iran) Hassan Ashjari			(substituted off) 75'
MF	31	(Iran) Shahin Kheiri	20'	Temporarily suspended
MF		(Iran) Mohammad Mansouri			(substituted off) 69'
MF	14	(Iran) Ghasem Hadadifar	46', 90'	Temporarily suspended
MF		(Iran) Mostafa Salehi Nejad	95'
FW	10	(Iran) Esmaeil Farhadi	31'		(substituted off) 84'
MF		(Iran) Mohammad Reza Khalatbari
Substitutes:
MF		(Iran) Ahmad Mohammadpour			(substituted in) 75'
MF	18	(Iran) Babak Razi		Temporarily suspended	(substituted in) 69'
FW	15	(Brazil) Igor José Marigo de Castro			(substituted in) 84'
Manager:
(Iran) Mansour Ebrahimzadeh

Rah Ahan:
GK	30	(Iran) Hossein Ashena	Temporarily suspended
DF	(Iran) Alireza Noormohammadi
DF	(Iran) Ebrahim Karimi
DF	(Iran) Abouzar Rahimi
DF	(Iran) Ali Mohammad Dehghan	Temporarily suspended	(substituted off) 85'
MF	(Iran) Hossein Pashaei
MF	(Iran) Majid Noormohammadi	(substituted off) 73'
MF	(Iran) Davoud Haghi	Temporarily suspended
FW	11	(Iran) Mojtaba Zarei	37'
FW	(Iran) Ahmad Momenzadeh
FW	(Iran) Sohrab Entezari	(substituted off) 61'
Substitutes:
DF	(Iran) Mohsen Mirabi	(substituted in) 85'
FW	(Iran) Amin Torkashvand	(substituted in) 73'
MF	(Armenia) Hamlet Mkhitaryan	(substituted in) 61'
Manager:
(Iran) Mehdi Tartar

== Champions ==
Champions 2008–09 Hazfi Cup
Zob Ahan Isfahan
Second title

== See also ==
- 2008–09 Persian Gulf Cup
- 2008–09 Azadegan League
- 2008–09 Iran Football's 2nd Division
- 2008–09 Iran Football's 3rd Division
- 2008–09 Hazfi Cup
- Iranian Super Cup
- 2008–09 Iranian Futsal Super League
