= 2010 AFC Champions League final =

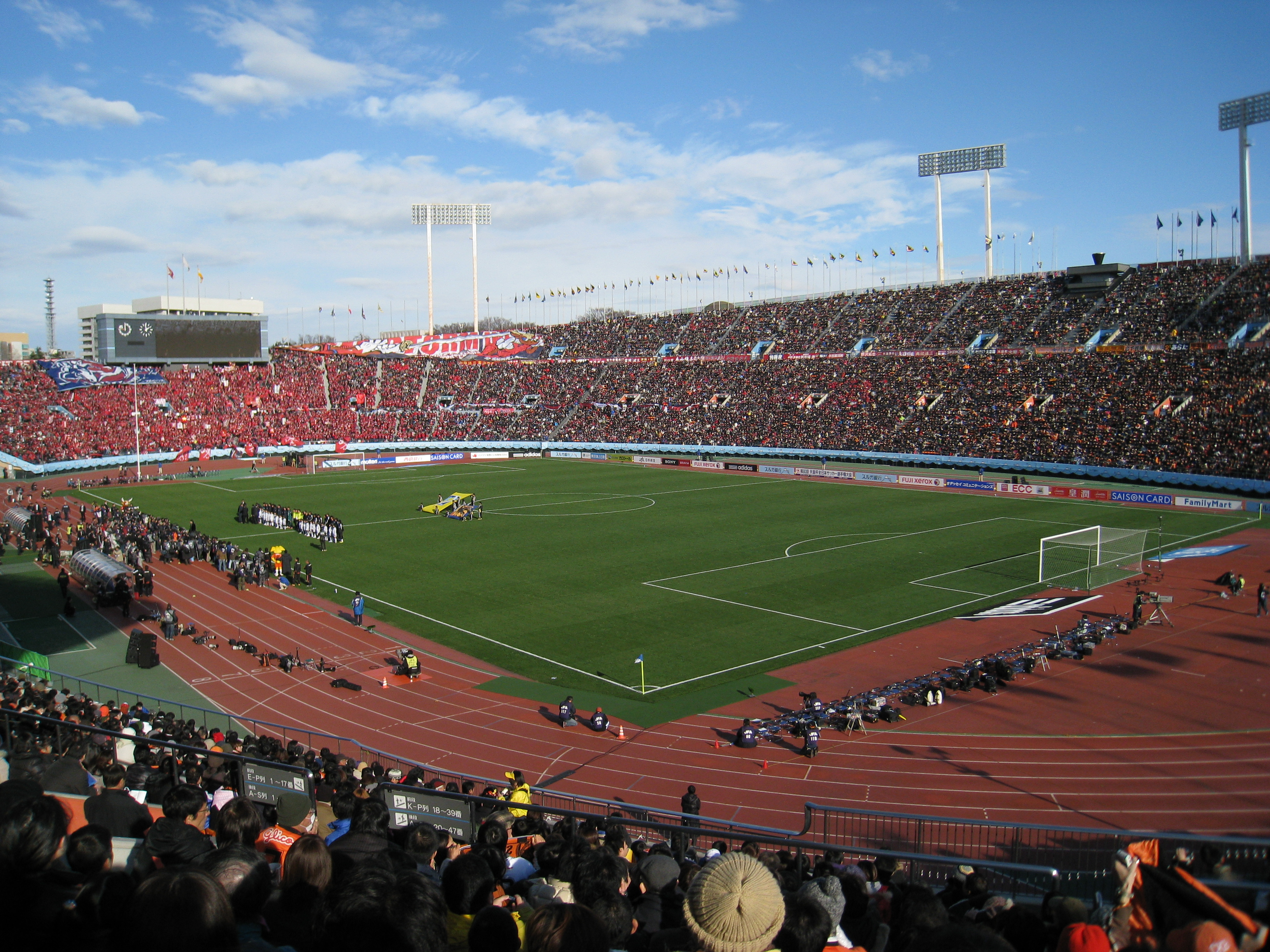
- Event: 2010 AFC Champions League
Seongnam Ilhwa Chunma	Zob Ahan
(South Korea)	(Iran)
3	1
- Date: 13 November 2010
- Venue: National Stadium, Tokyo
- AFC Man of the Match: Saša Ognenovski (Seongnam)
- Fans' Man of the Match: Saša Ognenovski (Seongnam)
- Referee: Yuichi Nishimura (Japan)
- Attendance: 27,308
- Weather: Fine

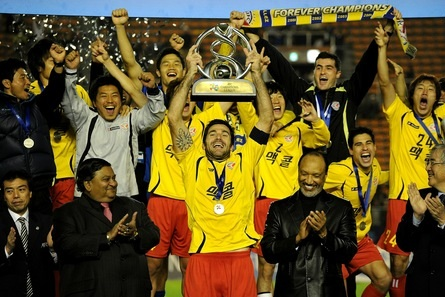
2010 AFC Champions League winner Seongnam Ilhwa Chunma.

The 2010 AFC Champions League final was a football match which was played on Saturday, 13 November 2010. It was the 29th final of the AFC Champions League, Asia's premier club football tournament. The match was played at the National Stadium in Tokyo and was contested by Seongnam Ilhwa Chunma of South Korea and Zob Ahan from Iran. For Seongnam this was the fourth appearance in the final of the main AFC tournament, after two consecutive Asian Club Championship finals in 1996 and 1997 and AFC Champions League final in 2004, with one trophy been won in 1996. Zob Ahan was a debutant of the final stage.

The winners entered the quarterfinals of the 2010 FIFA Club World Cup.

Seongnam won 3–1 to clinch the title.

== Qualified teams ==
Team	Previous finals appearances (bold indicates winners)
(South Korea) Seongnam Ilhwa Chunma	**1995**, 1997, 2004
(Iran) Zob Ahan	None

== Road to Tokyo ==
Seongnam Ilhwa Chunma			Round	Zob Ahan		
Main article: 2010 AFC Champions League group stage: Group E: Team / Pld / W / D / L / GF / GA / GD / Pts; (South Korea) Seongnam Ilhwa Chunma / 6 / 5 / 0 / 1 / 11 / 6 / +5 / **15**; (China) Beijing Guoan / 6 / 3 / 1 / 2 / 7 / 5 / +2 / **10**; (Japan) Kawasaki Frontale / 6 / 2 / 0 / 4 / 8 / 8 / 0 / **6**; (Australia) Melbourne Victory / 6 / 1 / 1 / 4 / 3 / 10 / −7 / **4**			Group stage	Main article: 2010 AFC Champions League group stage: Group B: Team / Pld / W / D / L / GF / GA / GD / Pts; (Iran) Zob Ahan / 6 / 4 / 1 / 1 / 8 / 3 / +5 / **13**; (Uzbekistan) Bunyodkor / 6 / 3 / 1 / 2 / 10 / 7 / +3 / **10**; (Saudi Arabia) Al-Ittihad / 6 / 2 / 2 / 2 / 9 / 7 / +2 / **8**; (United Arab Emirates) Al-Wahda / 6 / 1 / 0 / 5 / 3 / 13 / −10 / **3**		
Opponent	Result	Legs	Knockout stage	Opponent	Result	Legs
(Japan) Gamba Osaka	3–0	One-leg match played	Round of 16	(Iran) Mes Kerman	1–0	One-leg match played
(South Korea) Suwon Samsung Bluewings	4–3	4–1 home; 0–2 away	Quarterfinals	(South Korea) Pohang Steelers	3–2	2–1 home; 1–1 away
(Saudi Arabia) Al-Shabab	4–4 (a)	1–0 home; 3–4 away	Semifinals	(Saudi Arabia) Al-Hilal	2–0	1–0 home; 1–0 away

== Match details ==
13 November 2010
19:00 (JST)

Seongnam Ilhwa Chunma (South Korea)	3 – 1	(Iran) Zob Ahan
Ognenovski 29'; Cho Byung-kuk 53'; Kim Cheol-ho 83'	Report	Khalatbari 67'

National Stadium, Tokyo
Attendance: 27,308
Referee: Yuichi Nishimura (Japan)

**Seongnam Ilhwa Chunma**	**Zob Ahan**

GK	1	(South Korea) Jung Sung-ryong
CB	24	(South Korea) Kim Tae-yoon
CB	5	(South Korea) Cho Byung-kuk
CB	4	(Australia) Saša Ognenovski (c)
RM	2	(South Korea) Ko Jae-sung
CM	16	(South Korea) Kim Sung-hwan
CM	17	(South Korea) Kim Cheol-ho
LM	14	(South Korea) Song Ho-young		(substituted off) 80'
AM	30	(South Korea) Jo Jae-cheol	(yellow card) 71'
AM	11	(Colombia) Mauricio Molina
CF	9	(South Korea) Cho Dong-geon		(substituted off) 88'
**Substitutes**
DF	3	(South Korea) Yun Young-sun
DF	13	(South Korea) Jeong Ho-jeong
FW	18	(South Korea) Namkung Do		(substituted on) 88'
FW	20	(South Korea) Kim Jin-yong		(substituted on) 80'
FW	28	(South Korea) Moon Dae-seong
DF	38	(South Korea) Yong Hyun-jin
GK	41	(South Korea) Kang Sung-kwan
**Manager**
(South Korea) Shin Tae-yong

GK	1	(Iran) Shahab Gordan
RB	2	(Iran) Mohammad Hosseini
CB	3	(Iran) Mohamad Ali Ahmadi	(yellow card) 81'
CB	4	(Iran) Farshid Talebi
LB	25	(Iran) Hossein Mahini	(yellow card) 69'
CM	14	(Iran) Ghasem Hadadifar (c)
CM	19	(Iran) Mohammad Ghazi	(yellow card) 90'
CM	15	(Brazil) Igor Castro		(substituted off) 87'
RF	31	(Iran) Shahin Kheiri		(substituted off) 56'
CF	30	(Iran) Mehdi Rajabzadeh		(substituted off) 69'
LF	9	(Iran) Mohammad Reza Khalatbari
**Substitutes**
DF	5	(Iran) Mohammad Salsali		(substituted on) 87'
FW	10	(Iran) Esmail Farhadi		(substituted on) 69'
GK	12	(Iran) Abbas Ghasemi
MF	17	(Iran) Sina Ashouri	(yellow card) 86'	(substituted on) 56'
DF	23	(Iran) Ahmad Mohammadpour
MF	24	(Iran) Alireza Hadadifar
FW	32	(Iran) Jalal Rafkhaei
**Manager**
(Iran) Mansour Ebrahimzadeh

AFC Man of the Match:
(Australia) Saša Ognenovski (Seongnam Ilhwa Chunma)

Association referees:
Toru Sagara (Japan)
Toshiyuki Nagi (Japan)
Fourth official:
Hiroyoshi Takayama (Japan)

== See also ==
- 2010 AFC Champions League
- 2010 FIFA Club World Cup
