= 2008–09 Hazfi Cup =

Hazfi Cup
- Season: 2008–09
- Champions: Zob Ahan Isfahan
- Matches: 97
- Goals: 298 (3.07 per match)
- Biggest home win: Esteghlal Tehran 8–1 Damash Gilan
- Biggest away win: Azadi Bandar Rig 0–10 Niroye Zamini Tehran

The Hazfi Cup 2008–09 was the 22nd staging of Iran's football knockout competition. Esteghlal were the defending champions.

The cup winner, Zob Ahan Isfahan, were guaranteed a place in the 2010 AFC Champions League.

== First round ==
Matches were played between 9 and 11 October 2008.

Home team	Score	Away team
Persepolis Khorramabad	1–3	Armin Tehran
Shahrdari Kerman	2–2	Gostaresh Foolad
Foolad Gostar progress 5–3 on penalties.
Sanaye talaee Semnan	4–0	Saze saraye Mazandaran
Shahrdari Tabriz	(w/o)	Siman Khash
Shirin Faraz Kermanshah	3–0	Kashi Bastan Meybud Yazd
Nirou Moharekeh Qazvin	0–2	Sepahan Novin Esfahan
Palayeshgah Gaz Ilam	0–1	Naft Tehran
Foolad Yazd	8–2	Ekbatan Gachsaran
Mehrkam Pars Tehran	1–2	Shahrdari Yasuj
Mes Sarcheshme Kerman	1–1	Teraktor Sazi Tabriz
Teraktor Sazi progress 5–4 on penalties.
Kowsar Lorestan	1–1	Homa Tehran
Homa progress 3–1 on penalties.
Foolad Novin Ahvaz	4–0	Shahrdari Anzali
Ghandil Saqqez	0–2	Steel Azin Tehran
Ehsan Ray	2–0	Fajr Shahid Kalhor Karaj
Shahin Bushehr	1–0	Moghavemat Tehran
Aali Herfee Mashhad	0–5	Mes Rafsanjan
Maharat Semnan	1–3	Foolad Hormozgan
Petroshimi Tabriz	2–1	Sorkhposhan (Deihim Ahvaz)
Payam Shodaye Kelar Aabad	2–1	Shahrdari Shahrekord
Shohadaye Deh Kohrang	1–1	Sanat Gaz Sarakhs
Sanat Gaz progress 5–4 on penalties.
Azadi Bandar Rig	0–10	Niroye Zamini Tehran
Nafton Tehran	1–2	Sazan Rah Qom
Daneshgah Azad Langarud	2–0	Daro Sazi Sobhan Rasht
Esteghlal Abyek	1–3	Persepolis Qazvin
Sepidrood Rasht	3–1	Salim Rah Fars
Hepco Arak	1–1	Aflak Lorestan
Hepco progress 8–7 on penalties.
Eram Sazan Vahdat Qom	3–0	Azadi Shirvan
Shahin Bandar Gez	2–2	Aluminium Sazi Arak(B)
Shahin won on penalties.
Tarbiat Yazd	1–0	Kaveh Tehran

== Second round ==
Matches were played between 16 and 18 October 2008.

Home team	Score	Away team
Machine Sazi Tabriz	0–1	Petroshimi Tabriz
Persepolis Qazvin	1–0	Sanat Naft Abadan
Sanat Zogal Kerman	1–2	Shahin Ahvaz
Azar Aab Pile Savar Ardebil	1–2	Shirin Faraz Kermanshah
Mogavemat Mazandaran	1–0	Sepidrood Rasht
Bargh Esfehan	1–2	Foolad Yazd
Shahrdari Kerman	2–1	Mogavemat Basij Fars
Armin Tehran	2–1	Pasargard Bojnourd
Sanaye talaee Semnan	1–1	Shahin Bandar Gez
Sanaye Talaee progress 4–2 on penalties.
Sazan Rah Qom	1–2	Shahrdari Bandar Abbas
Daneshgah Azad Langarud	1–0	Aluminium Sazi Arak
Farhang Ramhormoz	0–0	Niroye Zamini Tehran
Niroye Zamini progress 3–1 on penalties.
Ehsan Ray	7–0	Ghahreman Kermanshah
Esteghlal Jonub Tehran	0–1	Naft Tehran
Payam Shodaye Kelar Aabad	3–1	Shahrdari Birjand
Shahin Bushehr	1–0	Payam Mokhaberat Shiraz
Tarbiat Yazd	1–2	Mes Rafsanjan
Sanat Gaz Sarakhs	(w/o)	Ghahreman Kish
Teraktor Sazi Tabriz	4–1	Foolad Hormozgan
Shamoushak Noshahr	3–2	Homa Tehran
Nassaji Mazandaran	(w/o)	Olympic Khoy

== Third round ==
Matches were played between 6 November and 13 December 2008.

Home team	Score	Away team
Steel Azin Tehran	2–1	Shahin Pars Jonoubi Bushehr
Niroye Zamini Tehran	0–1	Shahrdari Tabriz
Shirin Faraz Kermanshah	(w/o)	Shahin Ahvaz
Shahrdari Bandar Abbas	5–3	Foolad Novin Ahvaz
Petroshimi Tabriz	4–3	Persepolis Qazvin
Foolad Yazd	1–2	Shahrdari Yasuj
Sepahan Novin Esfahan	4–2	Daneshgah Azad Langarud
Naft Tehran	2–1	Ehsan Ray
Mogavemat Mazandaran	5–0	Eram Sazan Vahdat Qom
Nassaji Mazandaran	3–2	Hepco Arak
Teraktor Sazi Tabriz	2–0	Shahrdari Kerman
Zob Ahan Ardabil	0–1	Shamoushak Noshahr
Esteghlal Tehran	8–1	Damash Gilan
Mes Rafsanjan	1–0	Mes Kerman
Payam Shodaye Kelar Aabad Mazandaran	5–1	Sanat Gaz Sarakhs

== Final stage ==
=== Bracket ===
1st Round
Shahrdari Tabriz	0
Saba Qom	1
Shamoushak	2
Saipa	1
Malavan	2
Sepahan Novin	1
Mes Rafsanjan	2(5)
Esteghlal	2(4)
Shah. Bandar Abbas	1(3)
Foolad	1(4)
Esteghlal Ahvaz	1
Naft Tehran	0
Aboomoslem	3
Armin Tehran	2
Zob Ahan	4
Shirin Faraz	1
Sepahan	7
Mogavemat Mazandaran	1
Sanaye talaee	1
Persepolis	3
Shahrdari Yasuj	0
Pas Hamedan	3
Payam Mashhad	3
Shodaye Kelar Aabad	0
Nassaji Mazandaran	-
Bargh Shiraz	(w/o)
Petroshimi Tabriz	1
Rah Ahan	3
Paykan	0
Teraktor Sazi	1
Moghavemat Sepasi	0
Steel Azin	1

2nd Round
Saba Qom	6
Shamoushak	1
Malavan	0
Mes Rafsanjan	1
Foolad	1
Esteghlal Ahvaz	0
Aboomoslem	0
Zob Ahan	1
Sepahan	0
Persepolis	1
Pas Hamedan	4
Payam Mashhad	0
Bargh Shiraz	1
Rah Ahan	4
Teraktor Sazi	2(6)
Steel Azin	2(5)

Quarterfinals
Saba Qom	3
Mes Rafsanjan	2
Foolad	0
Zob Ahan	3
Persepolis	1
Pas Hamedan	2
Rah Ahan	1
Teraktor Sazi	0

Semifinals
Saba Qom	1(4)
Zob Ahan	1(5)
Pas Hamedan	0
Rah Ahan	1

Finals
Zob Ahan	0 / 5 (agg. 5)
Rah Ahan	1 / 1 (agg. 2)

=== Round of 32 ===
Matches were played between 21 November 2008 and 30 April 2009.

Home team	Score	Away team
Aboomoslem Mashhad	3–2	Armin Tehran
Zob Ahan Esfehan	4–1	Shirin Faraz Kermanshah
Sepahan Esfehan	7–1	Mogavemat Mazandaran
Moghavemat Sepasi Shiraz	0–1	Steel Azin Tehran
Paykan Qazvin	0–1	Teraktor Sazi Tabriz
Petroshimi Tabriz	1–3	Rah Ahan Ray
Shahrdari Bandar Abbas	1–1	Foolad Ahvaz
Foolad progress 4–3 on penalties.
Esteghlal Ahvaz	1–0	Naft Tehran
Sanaye talaee Semnan	1–3	Persepolis Tehran
Payam Mashhad	3–0	Payam Shodaye Kelar Aabad Mazandaran
Shahrdari Yasuj	0–3	Pas Hamedan
Shahrdari Tabriz	0–1	Saba Qom
Malavan Bandar Anzali	2–1	Sepahan Novin Esfahan
Shamoushak Noshahr	2–1	Saipa Karaj
Nassaji Mazandaran	(w/o)	Bargh Shiraz
Mes Rafsanjan	2–2	Esteghlal Tehran
Mes progress 5–4 on penalties.

=== Round of 16 ===
Matches were played between 8 March and 5 May 2009.

Home team	Score	Away team
Aboomoslem Mashhad	0–1	Zob Ahan Esfehan
Foolad Ahvaz	1–0	Esteghlal Ahvaz
Teraktor Sazi Tabriz	2–2	Steel Azin Tehran
Teraktor Sazi progress 6–5 on penalties.
Pas Hamedan	4–0	Payam Mashhad
Persepolis Tehran	1–0	Sepahan Esfehan
Saba Qom	6–1	Shamoushak Noshahr
Rah Ahan Ray	4–1	Bargh Shiraz
Mes Rafsanjan	1–0	Malavan Bandar Anzali

=== Quarter-finals ===
Matches were played between 1 and 10 May 2009.

Home team	Score	Away team
Zob Ahan Esfehan	3–0	Foolad Ahvaz
Teraktor Sazi Tabriz	0–1	Rah Ahan Ray
Pas Hamedan	2–1	Persepolis Tehran
Saba Qom	3–2	Mes Rafsanjan

=== Semi-finals ===
Matches were played on 14 May 2009.

Home team	Score	Away team
Saba Qom	1–1	Zob Ahan Esfehan
Zob Ahan progress 5–4 on penalties.
Rah Ahan Ray	1–0	Pas Hamedan

=== Final ===
Team 1	Agg.	Team 2	1st leg	2nd leg
Rah Ahan	2–5	Zob Ahan	1–0	1–5

=== Leg 1 ===
18 May 2009
17:00

Rah Ahan	1–0	Zob Ahan
Zarei 88'

Ekbatan Stadium, Ekbatan
Attendance: 5,000
Referee: Khodadad Afsharian

=== Leg 2 ===
22 May 2009
17:00

Zob Ahan	5–1	Rah Ahan
Kheiri 20'; Farhadi 31'; Hadadifar 46', 90'; Nejad 95'		Zarei 37'

Foolad Shahr Stadium, Fooladshahr
Attendance: 15,000
Referee: Saeed Mozafarizadeh

== See also ==
- 2008–09 Persian Gulf Cup
- 2008–09 Azadegan League
- 2008–09 Iran Football's 2nd Division
- 2009 Hazfi Cup Final
- Iranian Super Cup
- 2008–09 Iranian Futsal Super League
