= Ali Shojaei =

Ali Shojaei may refer to:

- Ali Shojaei (footballer, born 1953)
- Ali Shojaei (footballer, born 1997)
