= Mohsen Mirabi =

Iranian footballer

Personal information
- Date of birth: 8 August 1986 (age 40)
- Place of birth: Iran
- Position: Midfielder

Youth career
- –2006: Pas Tehran

Senior career*
| Years | Team | Apps | (Gls) |
| 2006–2007 | Pas Tehran | 3 | (0) |
| 2007–2008 | Pas | 12 | (0) |
| 2008– | Rah Ahan | 41 | (1) |
| 2011 | → Gostaresh (loan) | | |
| 2012–2013 | Nassaji Mazandaran | 14 | (1) |
| 2013–2014 | Esteghlal Ahvaz | 13 | (1) |
| 2014–2015 | Parseh Tehran | 9 | (2) |
| 2015 | Rah Ahan | 1 | (0) |

International career
| 2009– | Iran | 4 | (0) |
| 2007– | Iran U20 | 7 | (1) |
| 2005– | Iran U17 | 13 | (3) |
- * Club domestic league appearances and goals

Mohsen Mirabi (born 8 August 1983) is an Iranian former professional footballer who played as a midfielder.

== Career ==
Mirabi joined Rah Ahan F.C. in 2008.

== Career statistics ==
Appearances and goals by club, season and competition
| Club | Season | League | | | Hazfi Cup | | Asia | | Total | |
| Club | Season | Division | Apps | Goals | Apps | Goals | Apps | Goals | Apps | Goals |
|---|---|---|---|---|---|---|---|---|---|---|
| Rah Ahan | 2010–11 | Persian Gulf Cup | 7 | 0 | | | | | | |
| Nassaji Mazandaran | 2012–13 | Azadegan League | 14 | 1 | | | | | | |
| Esteghlal Ahvaz | 2013–14 | Azadegan League | 13 | 1 | | | | | | |
| Parseh Tehran | 2014–15 | Azadegan League | 9 | 2 | | | | | | |
| Rah Ahan | 2014–15 | Persian Gulf Pro League | 1 | 0 | | | | | | |
| Career total | | | | | | | | | | |
