= Mohammad Ghazi (footballer) =

Iranian footballer

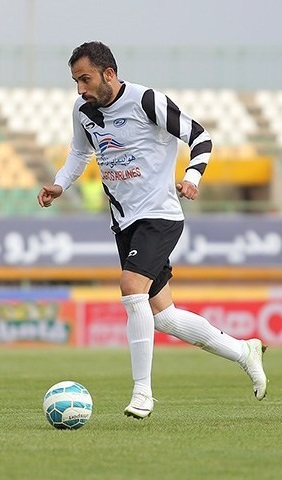
- Ghazi in 2016

Personal information
- Full name: Mohammad Ghazi Najafabadi
- Date of birth: December 30, 1984 (age 41)
- Place of birth: Tehran, Iran
- Height: 1.87 m (6 ft 1 1/2 in)
- Position: Striker

Senior career*
Years	Team	Apps	(Gls)
2004–2006	Fajr Sepasi Shiraz		
2005–2006	→ Oghab (loan)		
2006–2007	Homa		
2007–2009	Foolad	49	(14)
2009–2012	Zob Ahan	81	(16)
2012–2013	Persepolis	22	(3)
2013–2015	Esteghlal	40	(11)
2015	Foolad	9	(3)
2015–2016	Saba Qom	27	(5)
2016–2017	Naft Tehran	26	(12)
2017–2018	Padideh	29	(11)
2018–2019	Paykan	21	(3)
2019	Nassaji	7	(0)
2020	Shahr Khodro	13	(2)
2020–2021	Mes Rafsanjan	23	(3)
2021–2022	Havadar	13	(1)

International career^{‡}
2011–2013	Iran	10	(3)
- * Club domestic league appearances and goals as of 19 October 2017 ‡ National team caps and goals as of 22 September 2012

Mohammad Ghazi (Persian: محمد قاضی; born December 30, 1984) is an Iranian footballer who plays as a striker for Havadar in the Persian Gulf Pro League.

== Career ==
Ghazi joined Zob Ahan in 2009 after spending the previous two seasons at Foolad. He signed a two-year contract with Persepolis on 30 May 2012. After spending one season at Persepolis which he was almost on the bench and not a starter, he terminated his contract with the club. He joined Esteghlal with a one-year contract before the start of 2013–14 season. He extended his contract with Esteghlal for another two years on 14 June 2014.

=== Club career statistics ===
As of 31 December 2017.

Club	Division	Season	League		Hazfi Cup		Asia		Total	
Club	Division	Season	Apps	Goals	Apps	Goals	Apps	Goals	Apps	Goals
Foolad	Division 1	2007–08	24	6	5	2	–	–	31	8
Foolad	Pro League	2008–09	28	6	3	0	–	–	31	6
Zob Ahan	Pro League	2009–10	28	3	5	4	12	2	45	9
Zob Ahan	Pro League	2010–11	26	6	1	0	7	4	34	10
Zob Ahan	Pro League	2011–12	29	7	2	1	1	0	32	9
Persepolis	Pro League	2012–13	22	3	3	0	–	–	25	3
Esteghlal	Pro League	2013–14	25	7	3	0	10	4	38	11
Esteghlal	Pro League	2014–15	15	4	2	1	–	–	17	5
Foolad	Pro League	2014–15	8	3	0	0	3	0	11	3
Saba Qom	Pro League	2015–16	27	5	0	0	–	–	27	5
Naft Tehran	Pro League	2016–17	26	9	3	3	–	–	29	12
Padideh	Pro League	2017–18	16	9	1	0	–	–	17	9
Peykan	Pro League	2018–19	20	3	1	0	–	–	21	3
Career totals			294	71	29	11	32	10	358	92

- Assist Goals

Season	Team	Assists
09–10	Zob Ahan	2
10–11	Zob Ahan	1
11–12	Zob Ahan	2
12–13	Persepolis	2
13–14	Esteghlal	1
14–15	Esteghlal	0

== International career ==
He was called to the national team for World Cup 2014 qualification by coach Carlos Queiroz.

=== International goals ===
Scores and results list Iran's goal tally first.

#	Date	Venue	Opponent	Score	Result	Competition
1	5 October 2011	Azadi Stadium, Tehran	Palestine	1–0	7–0 W	Friendly
2	23 February 2012	Zabeel Stadium, Dubai	Jordan	1–2	2–2 D	Friendly
3	15 August 2012	Széktói Stadion, Kecskemét	Tunisia	1–1	2–2 D	Friendly

== Honours ==
=== Club ===
Zob Ahan

- AFC Champions League: 2010 (Runner-up)
- Iran Pro League: 2009–10 (Runner-up)

Persepolis

- Hazfi Cup: 2012–13 (Runner-up)

Naft Tehran

- Hazfi Cup (1): 2016–17

=== Individual ===
- Hazfi Cup Top scorer: 2016–17
