= Mohammad Mansouri (born 1979) =

Iranian footballer

Personal information
- Full name: Mohammad Mansouri
- Date of birth: 23 September 1979 (age 47)
- Place of birth: Iran
- Position: Midfielder

Senior career*
Years	Team	Apps	(Gls)
1999–2004	Bargh Shiraz	121	(29)
2004–2010	Zob Ahan	155	(8)
2010–2011	Mes Kerman	29	(2)
2011	Saipa	9	(0)
2012–2013	Mes Sarcheshmeh	0	(0)
- * Club domestic league appearances and goals as of 3 January 2012 (UTC) ‡ National team caps and goals as of 10 May 2010

Mohammad Mansouri (born September 23, 1979) is an Iranian footballer who currently plays for Mes Sarcheshmeh in the Iran Pro League.

== Club career ==
Mansouri has been with Zob Ahan since 2004.

=== Club career statistics ===
As of 4 August 2011

Club performance			League		Cup		Continental		Total	
Season	Club	League	Apps	Goals	Apps	Goals	Apps	Goals	Apps	Goals
Iran			League		Hazfi Cup		Asia		Total	
1999–00	Bargh	Division 2	14	1			-	-		
2000–01	Bargh	Azadegan League	24	5			-	-		
2001–02	Bargh	Pro League	28	8			-	-		
2002–03	Bargh	Pro League	27	8			-	-		
2003–04	Bargh	Pro League	28	7			-	-		
2004–05	Zob Ahan	Pro League	15	1			-	-		
2005–06	Zob Ahan	Pro League	18	1			-	-		
2006–07	Zob Ahan	Pro League	28	1			-	-		
2007–08	Zob Ahan	Pro League	28	2			-	-		
2008–09	Zob Ahan	Pro League	32	2			-	-		
2009–10	Zob Ahan	Pro League	34	1			7	0		
2010–11	Mes	Pro League	29	2			-	-		
2011–12	Saipa	Pro League	9	0	1	0	-	-	10	0
2011–12	Mes SCH	Pro League	0	0	0	0	-	-	0	0
Career total			314	38			7	0		

- Assist Goals

Season	Team	Assists
09–10	Zob Ahan	5
10–11	Mes	2
11–12	Saipa	1
11–12	Mes SCH	0
