= Mohammad Ahmadpouri =

Iranian football midfielder

Personal information
- Date of birth: 21 September 1979 (age 47)
- Place of birth: Masjed Soleyman, Iran
- Position: Forward

Senior career*
Years	Team	Apps	(Gls)
2007	Kesht-o-Sanat Shoushtar		
2007–2009	Shirin Faraz	32	(16)
2009–2011	Shahin Bushehr	39	(9)
2011	→ Tractor Sazi (loan)	6	(0)
2011–2012	Zob Ahan	12	(1)
2012–2013	Iranjavan		
2013	Aboomoslem	9	(3)
2014	Yazd Louleh	8	(2)
2014–2015	Rahian		
- * Club domestic league appearances and goals

Mohammad Ahmadpouri (Persian: محمد احمدپوری; born 21 September 1979) is an Iranian former football midfielder.

== Club career ==
In 2009, Ahmadpouri joined Shahin Bushehr after spending the previous two years at Shirin Faraz

=== Club career statistics ===
Last Update 21 September 2011

Club performance			League		Cup		Continental		Total	
Season	Club	League	Apps	Goals	Apps	Goals	Apps	Goals	Apps	Goals
Iran			League		Hazfi Cup		Asia		Total	
2007–08	Shirin Faraz	Pro League	21	2			-	-		
2008–09	Shirin Faraz	Division 1	11	14			-	-		
2009–10	Shahin	Pro League	29	9			-	-		
2010–11	Shahin	Pro League	10	0	1	0	-	-	11	0
2010–11	Tractor Sazi	Pro League	6	0	0	0	-	-	6	0
2011–12	Zob Ahan	Pro League	1	1	0	0	0	0	1	1
Career total			78	16			0	0		

- Assist Goals

Season	Team	Assists
09–10	Shahin	1
10–11	Shahin	0
11–12	Zob Ahan	0
