= Hugo Machado =

Portuguese footballer

Personal information
- Full name: Hugo Miguel Alves Machado
- Date of birth: 4 July 1982 (age 44)
- Place of birth: Lisbon, Portugal
- Height: 1.75 m (5 ft 9 in)
- Position: Attacking midfielder

Team information
- Current team: Olivais Moscavide

Youth career
- 1991–2001: Sporting CP

Senior career*
Years	Team	Apps	(Gls)
2001–2005	Sporting CP B	100	(12)
2004–2005	→ Estrela Amadora (loan)	20	(1)
2005–2006	Barreirense	27	(2)
2006	Apollon Limassol	10	(0)
2006–2008	Olympiakos Nicosia	36	(5)
2008–2009	Alki Larnaca	25	(1)
2009–2010	Standard Sumgayit	25	(3)
2010–2011	Naval	16	(0)
2011–2012	Zob Ahan	38	(3)
2012–2013	Sanat Naft	8	(0)
2013	Churchill Brothers	8	(1)
2014–2015	Kallithea	27	(4)
2015–2016	Chania	27	(3)
2016–2017	OFI	1	(0)
2017–2018	Oriental	28	(7)
2018–2019	Real Massamá	30	(7)
2019–2020	Loures	23	(6)
2020–2021	Cova Piedade	7	(0)
2021	Loures	13	(2)
2021–2024	Oriental	79	(26)
2024−2025	Atlético Malveira	26	(5)
2025−	Olivais Moscavide	9	(2)

International career
1998	Portugal U15	8	(1)
- * Club domestic league appearances and goals as of 20:44, 29 December 2025 (UTC)

Hugo Miguel Alves Machado (born 4 July 1982 in Lisbon) is a Portuguese footballer who plays as an attacking midfielder for C.D. Olivais e Moscavide.

== Career statistics ==
As of 6 November 2013

Season	Club	League			Cup		Other		Total	
Season	Club	Division	Apps	Goals	Apps	Goals	Apps	Goals	Apps	Goals
2000–01	Sporting CP B	Segunda Divisão	1	0	0	0	-		1	0
2001–02	Sporting CP B	Segunda Divisão	28	1	0	0	-		28	1
2002–03	Sporting CP B	Segunda Divisão	36	4	0	0	-		36	4
2003–04	Sporting CP B	Segunda Divisão	35	7	0	0	-		35	7
2004–05	Estrela Amadora	Segunda Liga	20	1	2	0	-		22	1
2005–06	Barreirense	Segunda Liga	27	2	0	0	-		27	2
2006–07	Apollon Limassol	Cypriot First Division	10	0			2	0	12	0
2006–07	Olympiakos Nicosia	Cypriot First Division	11	0			-		11	0
2007–08	Olympiakos Nicosia	Cypriot First Division	25	5			-		25	5
2008–09	Alki Larnaca	Cypriot First Division	25	1			-		25	1
2009–10	Standard Sumgayit	Azerbaijan Premier League	25	3	2	0	-		27	3
2010–11	Naval	Primeira Liga	16	0	3	0	0	0	19	0
2011–12	Zob Ahan	Iran Pro League	23	2	0	0	2	0	25	2
2012–13	Zob Ahan	Iran Pro League	15	1	0	0	1	0	16	1
2012–13	Sanat Naft	Iran Pro League	8	0	0	0	-		8	0
2013–14	Churchill Brothers	I-League	8	1	3	0	0	0	11	1
Total	Portugal		163	15	5	0	-	-	168	15
Total	Cyprus		71	6	0	0	2	0	73	6
Total	Azerbaijan		25	3	2	0	-	-	27	3
Total	Iran		46	3	0	0	3	0	49	3
Total	India		8	1	3	0	0	0	11	1
Career total			313	24	10	0	5	0	328	24
