= Vinicius Evandro =

Brazilian footballer

Personal information
- Full name: Vinicius Julianetti Evandro
- Date of birth: April 23, 1987 (age 39)
- Place of birth: Araraquara, Brazil
- Height: 1.69 m (5 ft 6 1/2 in)
- Position: Defender

Team information
- Current team: Brusque

Senior career*
Years	Team	Apps	(Gls)
2008	Joinville		
2008–2010	Tours FC	10	(0)
2009–2010	→ Rodez AF (loan)	21	(1)
2010–2011	Zob Ahan	5	(0)
2011–	Brusque	5	(0)
- * Club domestic league appearances and goals as of 13:44, 1 feb 2011(UTC)

Vinicius Julianetti Evandro, known as Vinicius Evandro (born April 23, 1987) is a Brazilian professional football player. Currently, he plays for Brusque Futebol Clube.

He played on the professional level in Ligue 2 for Tours FC and Zob Ahan in Iran Pro League.

== Club career ==
=== Club Career Statistics ===
Last update: 1 Feb 2010

Club performance			League		Cup		Continental		Total	
Season	Club	League	Apps	Goals	Apps	Goals	Apps	Goals	Apps	Goals
Iran			League		Hazfi Cup		Asia		Total	
2010-11	Zob Ahan	Persian Gulf Cup	5	0	1	0	0	0	6	0
Total	Iran		5	0	1	0	0	0	6	0
Career total			5	0	1	0	0	0	6	0

- Assist Goals

Season	Team	Assists
10/11	Zob Ahan	0
