= Hamid Parvar =

Iranian footballer

Personal information
- Date of birth: 12 September 1989 (age 37)
- Place of birth: Iran
- Position: Defender

Youth career
- 2007–2010: Zob Ahan

Senior career*
Years	Team	Apps	(Gls)
2010–2014	Zob Ahan	8	(0)
2016–2017	Shahrdari Hamedan		
- * Club domestic league appearances and goals

Hamid Parvar (Persian: حمید پرور; born 12 September 1989) is an Iranian former footballer.

== Club career ==
Parvar has been with Zob Ahan since 2010.

Club performance			League		Cup		Continental		Total	
Season	Club	League	Apps	Goals	Apps	Goals	Apps	Goals	Apps	Goals
Iran			League		Hazfi Cup		Asia		Total	
2010–11	Zob Ahan	IPL	1	0			1	0		
Total	Iran		1	0			1	0		
Career total			1	0			1	0		

== External sources ==
- Profile at PersianLeague
