= Mostafa Salehinejad =

Iranian footballer

Personal information
- Full name: Mostafa Salehinejad
- Date of birth: 21 March 1981 (age 45)
- Place of birth: Isfahan, Iran
- Position: Defender

Youth career
- Zob Ahan

Senior career*
Years	Team	Apps	(Gls)
2004–2010	Zob Ahan	124	(5)
2010–	Paykan	4	(0)
- * Club domestic league appearances and goals as of 30 September 2010

Mostafa Salehi Nejad is an Iranian football player who currently plays for Paykan in Iran's Premier Football League.

== Club career ==
=== Club career statistics ===
Last Update 19 October 2010

Club performance			League		Cup		Continental		Total	
Season	Club	League	Apps	Goals	Apps	Goals	Apps	Goals	Apps	Goals
Iran			League		Hazfi Cup		Asia		Total	
2004–05	Zob Ahan	Persian Gulf Cup	22	0			-	-		
2005–06	Zob Ahan	Persian Gulf Cup	23	1			-	-		
2006–07	Zob Ahan	Persian Gulf Cup	6	0			-	-		
2007–08	Zob Ahan	Persian Gulf Cup	28	1			-	-		
2008–09	Zob Ahan	Persian Gulf Cup	25	2			-	-		
2009–10	Zob Ahan	Persian Gulf Cup	20	1			6	0		
2010–11	Paykan	Persian Gulf Cup	4	0	1	0	-	-	5	0
Total	Iran		128	5			6	0		
Total	Career total			5			6	0		

- Assist Goals

Season	Team	Assists
05–06	Zob Ahan	1
07–08	Zob Ahan	1
09–10	Zob Ahan	1
10–11	Paykan	0
