= Ali Shojaei (footballer, born 1953) =

Iranian footballer

Personal information
- Full name: Ali Shojaei
- Date of birth: March 23, 1953 (age 73)
- Place of birth: Iran
- Position: Libero

Senior career*
Years	Team	Apps	(Gls)
1973–1976	Zob Ahan		
1977–1978	Sepahan		

International career
1977–1978	Iran	5	(0)
- * Club domestic league appearances and goals

Ali Shojaei is a retired Iranian football player.

== Club career ==
He played for Zob Ahan and Sepahan Isfahan in his career.

== International career ==
He played for the Iran national football team and participated at the 1978 FIFA World Cup as a member of the squad.
