= Ali Goudarzi =

Iranian footballer

Personal information
- Full name: Ali Goudarzi
- Date of birth: March 8, 1992 (age 34)
- Place of birth: Anzali, Iran
- Height: 1.76 m (5 ft 9 1/2 in)
- Position: Defender

Youth career
- 2009–2013: Zob Ahan

Senior career*
Years	Team	Apps	(Gls)
2010–2013	Zob Ahan	11	(0)
2013–2014	Saba Qom	0	(0)
2014–2015	Esteghlal Ahvaz	14	(3)
2015-2016	Naft Masjed Soleyman F.C.	20	(0)
2016	F.C. Kheybar Khorramabad	7	(0)
2016–2017	F.C. Nassaji Mazandaran	8	(0)
2017–2018	Naft Masjed Soleyman F.C.	22	(0)
2018–2019	Shahin Bushehr F.C.	19	(1)
2019–2020	Aluminium Arak F.C.	12	(0)
2020	Havadar S.C.	3	(0)
2020–2021	Shahin Bushehr F.C.	21	(2)
2021–2022	F.C. Rayka Babol	12	(0)
2022–	Shams Azar F.C.	5	(1)

International career
2009–2011	Iran U-17		
- * Club domestic league appearances and goals as of 15 April 2015

Ali Goudarzi (Persian: علی گودرزی; born March 8, 1992) is an Iranian footballer.

== Club career ==
Goudarzi had been with Zob Ahan from 2010 to 2013.

Club performance			League		Cup		Continental		Total	
Season	Club	League	Apps	Goals	Apps	Goals	Apps	Goals	Apps	Goals
Iran			League		Hazfi Cup		Asia		Total	
2010–11	Zob Ahan	Pro League	0	0	0	0	0	0	0	0
2011–12	Zob Ahan	Pro League	9	0	0	0	0	0	9	0
2012–13	Zob Ahan	Pro League	2	0	0	0	–	–	2	0
2013–14	Saba Qom	Pro League	0	0	0	0	–	–	0	0
Career total			11	0	0	0	0	0	11	0

== External sources ==
- Profile at PersianLeague
- Ali Goudarzi at Soccerway (archived)
