= Hamid Shafaat =

Iranian footballer

Personal information
- Date of birth: 3 November 1984 (age 42)
- Place of birth: Isfahan, Iran
- Height: 1.86 m (6 ft 1 in)
- Position: Defender

Senior career*
Years	Team	Apps	(Gls)
2010–2013	Zob Ahan	31	(0)
2013–2016	Giti Pasand	57	(0)
2016–2017	Sepehr Naghshe Jahan		
- * Club domestic league appearances and goals

Hamid Shafaat (Persian: حمید شفاعت; born 3 November 1984) is an Iranian former footballer.

== Club career ==
Shafaat had been with Zob Ahan from 2010 to 2013.

Club performance			League		Cup		Continental		Total	
Season	Club	League	Apps	Goals	Apps	Goals	Apps	Goals	Apps	Goals
Iran			League		Hazfi Cup		Asia		Total	
2010–11	Zob Ahan	Pro League	1	0			2	0		
2011–12	Zob Ahan	Pro League	16	0			0	0		
2012–13	Zob Ahan	Pro League	6	0	0	0	–	–	6	0
2013–14	Giti Pasand	Division 1	21	0			0	0	21	0
2014–15	Giti Pasand	Division 1	14	0			0	0	14	0
2015–16	Giti Pasand	Division 1	21	0			0	0	21	0
Career total			79	0			2	0		

== External sources ==
- Profile at PersianLeague
- https://metafootball.com/fa/info/person/%D8%AD%D9%85%DB%8C%D8%AF-%D8%B4%D9%81%D8%A7%D8%B9%D8%AA/25170/
