= Ebrahim Karimi (footballer) =

Iranian footballer

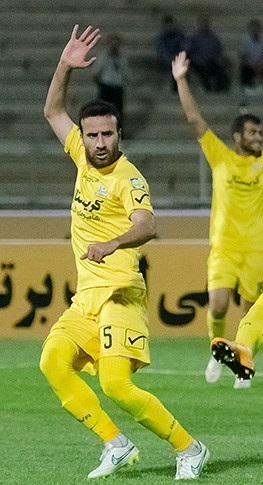

Personal information
- Full name: Ebrahim Karimi Senjid
- Date of birth: 6 March 1986 (age 40)
- Place of birth: Rey, Iran
- Height: 1.78 m (5 ft 10 in)
- Position: Central defender

Youth career
- 1999–2006: Rah Ahan

Senior career*
Years	Team	Apps	(Gls)
2005–2016	Rah Ahan	281	(2)
2016–2018	Baadraan	52	(0)
2018	Arvand Khorramshahr	8	(0)

International career
2007	Iran U–23	5	(0)
2012	Iran	1	(0)
- * Club domestic league appearances and goals

Ebrahim Karimi Senjid (Persian: ابراهیم کریمی; born 6 March 1986) is an Iranian former footballer.

== Club career ==
Karimi has played most of his career with Rah Ahan.

=== Club career statistics ===
As of 18 December 2015

Club performance			League		Cup		Continental		Total	
Season	Club	League	Apps	Goals	Apps	Goals	Apps	Goals	Apps	Goals
Iran			League		Hazfi Cup		Asia		Total	
2005–06	Rah Ahan	Pro League	0	0	2	0	–		2	0
2006–07	Rah Ahan	Pro League	20	0	1	0	–		21	0
2007–08	Rah Ahan	Pro League	32	0	2	0	–		34	0
2008–09	Rah Ahan	Pro League	33	1	1	0	–		34	1
2009–10	Rah Ahan	Pro League	29	0	1	0	–		30	0
2010–11	Rah Ahan	Pro League	28	0	1	0	–		29	0
2011–12	Rah Ahan	Pro League	31	0	1	0	–		32	0
2012–13	Rah Ahan	Pro League	31	0	0	0	–		31	0
2013–14	Rah Ahan	Pro League	22	0	1	0	–		23	0
2014–15	Rah Ahan	Pro League	22	0	2	0	–		24	0
2015–16	Rah Ahan	Pro League	15	0	3	0	–		18	0
Career total			248	1	15	0	–		263	1

== International career ==
He made his debut against Mauritania in April 2012 under Carlos Queiroz.
