= Iman Shirazi =

Iranian footballer (born 1992)

Personal information
- Date of birth: 11 March 1992 (age 34)
- Place of birth: Isfahan, Iran
- Height: 1.83 m (6 ft 0 in)
- Position: Defender

Youth career
- –2013: Zob Ahan

Senior career*
Years	Team	Apps	(Gls)
2013–2014	Rah Ahan	12	(0)
2014–2016	Giti Pasand	27	(0)
2016–2017	Nirooye Zamini		
2017–2018	Sardar Bukan	20	(0)
2018–2019	Moghavemat Tehran		
2019–2020	Sardar Bukan		
2020–2022	Van Pars		

International career
2008–2009	Iran U-17	6	(0)
2010	Iran U-19	2	(0)
- * Club domestic league appearances and goals

Iman Shirazi (Persian: ایمان شیرازی; born 11 March 1992) is an Iranian former footballer.
