= Omid Abolhassani =

Iranian footballer (born 1988)

Personal information
- Date of birth: 20 September 1988 (age 38)
- Place of birth: Tehran, Iran
- Height: 1.82 m (6 ft 0 in)
- Position: Striker

Team information
- Current team: Van Pars

Youth career
- 2005–2008: Zob Ahan

Senior career*
Years	Team	Apps	(Gls)
2007–2008	Zob Ahan	13	(3)
2008–2010	PAS Hamedan	39	(4)
2010–2012	Zob Ahan	11	(0)
2012–2013	Shahin Bushehr		
2013–2015	Albadr		
2015–2016	Giti Pasand	9	(1)
2016–2017	Naft Novin		
2017–2018	Saba Qom	5	(1)
2021–2022	Shahid Ghandi Yazd		
2022–2023	Parseh Isfahan		
2023–	Van Pars		

International career^{‡}
2010	Iran U23	2	(0)
- * Club domestic league appearances and goals as of 29 April 2018 ‡ National team caps and goals as of 29 September 2010

Omid Abolhassani (Persian: امید ابولحسنی; born 20 September 1988) is an Iranian footballer who plays for Van Pars as a striker. He was banned from any sports activity for four years, due to his use of forbidden substance higenamine.

== Career ==
A product of the Zob Ahan 's youth system, Rasouli was drafted into the first team for the IPL 2007/08 season.

Omid Abolhasani was banned from any sports activity for four years, due to his use of forbidden substance higenamine.

== Club career ==
Club performance			League		Cup		Continental		Total	
Season	Club	League	Apps	Goals	Apps	Goals	Apps	Goals	Apps	Goals
Iran			League		Hazfi Cup		Asia		Total	
2008–09	Pas	Persian Gulf Cup	23	3	1	0	-	-	24	3
2009–10	Pas	Persian Gulf Cup	16	1		0	-	-		1
2010–11	Zob Ahan	Persian Gulf Cup	4	0	0	0	3	0	7	0
2011–12	Zob Ahan	Persian Gulf Cup	1	0	0	0	0	0	1	0
Total	Iran		44	4		0	3	0		4
Career total			44	4		0	3	0		4

- Assists

Season	Team	Assists
08/09	PAS Hamedan	1
09/10	PAS Hamedan	2
10/11	Zob Ahan	1
