= Davoud Haghi =

Iranian footballer

Personal information
- Full name: Davoud Haghi
- Date of birth: 26 January 1981 (age 45)
- Place of birth: Tehran, Iran
- Position: Midfielder

Youth career
- Dokhaniat Tehran

Senior career*
Years	Team	Apps	(Gls)
- Nirouye Zamini
2002–2005	Esteghlal Ahvaz	?	(6)
2005–2007	Rah Ahan	26	(6)
2007–2008	Esteghlal Ahvaz	32	(10)
2008–2009	Rah Ahan	29	(12)
2009–2011	Saba	59	(16)
2011–2012	Zob Ahan	15	(4)
2013–2014	Paykan	17	(2)

International career
2003–2004	Iran U23	2	(1)
2008	Iran	6	(0)
- * Club domestic league appearances and goals as of 21 September 2011

Davoud Haghi (Persian: داوود حقی, born 26 January 1981) is an Iranian former footballer. He was Iran Pro League best assist in 2007–08 season.

== Club career ==
Haghi has played for Esteghlal Ahvaz in the Iranian Premier League.

=== Club career statistics ===
As of 6 May 2013

Club performance			League		Cup		Continental		Total	
Season	Club	League	Apps	Goals	Apps	Goals	Apps	Goals	Apps	Goals
Iran			League		Hazfi Cup		Asia		Total	
2002–03	Esteghlal Ahvaz	Persian Gulf Cup		3			-	-		
2003–04	Esteghlal Ahvaz	Persian Gulf Cup	21	3			-	-		
2004–05	Esteghlal Ahvaz	Persian Gulf Cup	0	0			-	-		
2005–06	Rah Ahan	Persian Gulf Cup	2	0			-	-		
2006–07	Rah Ahan	Persian Gulf Cup	24	6			-	-		
2007–08	Esteghlal Ahvaz	Persian Gulf Cup	32	10			-	-		
2008–09	Rah Ahan	Persian Gulf Cup	29	12			-	-		
2009–10	Saba	Persian Gulf Cup	30	13			-	-		
2010–11	Saba	Persian Gulf Cup	29	3	1	0	-	-	30	3
2011–12	Zob Ahan	Persian Gulf Cup	30	0	0	0	2	0	32	0
2012–13	Paykan	Persian Gulf Cup	17	0	2	0	0	0	19	0
Career total				53			2	0		

- Assist Goals

Season	Team	Assists
07–08	Esteghlal Ahvaz	8
08–09	Rah Ahan	2
09–10	Saba	3
10–11	Saba	1
11–12	Zob Ahan	0
