= Rah Ahan-e Ekbatan Stadium =

Multi-purpose stadium in Tehran, Iran

Coordinates: 35°42′30″N 51°18′53″E

Rah Ahan-e Ekbatan
- Interactive map of Rah Ahan-e Ekbatan
- Full name: Rah Ahan-e Ekbatan Stadium
- Former names: Apadana Stadium; Persepolis Stadium (During the 1974 Asian Games)
- Location: Ekbatan, Tehran, Iran
- Owner: Rah Ahan F.C.
- Operator: Rah Ahan F.C.
- Capacity: 12,000
- Surface: Grass

Construction
- Built: 1973
- Opened: 1973

Tenant
- Rah Ahan F.C. 1975-

The Rah Ahan-e Ekbatan Stadium (Persian: ورزشگاه راه‌آهن اکباتان) formerly known as Apadana Stadium (Persian: ورزشگاه آپادانا) and Persepolis Stadium (Persian: ورزشگاه پرسپولیس) is a multi-purpose stadium in Tehran, Iran. It is currently used mostly for football matches and is the home stadium of Rah Ahan F.C., who currently play in Iran's Premier Football League.The stadium holds 12,000 people.

== Tournaments ==
The Stadium under the name of Persepolis Stadium along with Aryamehr Stadium and Amjadieh Stadium was the host of preliminary round of the football matches at the 1974 Asian Games (Group A and Group C).

Rah Ahan Stadium and Shahid Dastgerdi Stadium hosted the 2012 AFC U-16 Championship.
