= Sina Ashouri =

Iranian footballer (born 1988)

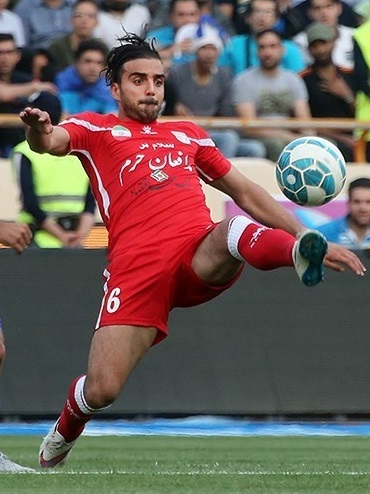
- Ashoru with Tractor colours

Personal information
- Full name: Sina Ashouri
- Date of birth: 16 September 1988 (age 38)
- Place of birth: Falavarjan, Iran
- Height: 1.78 m (5 ft 10 in)
- Position: Defensive midfielder

Youth career
- 2006–2008: Zob Ahan

Senior career*
Years	Team	Apps	(Gls)
2008–2016	Zob Ahan	131	(5)
2015–2016	→ Tractor (loan)	21	(0)
2016–2018	Tractor	13	(1)

International career^{‡}
2004	Iran U17		
2006–2007	Iran U20		
2007–2010	Iran U23	4	(0)
- * Club domestic league appearances and goals as of 16 September 2016 ‡ National team caps and goals as of 25 November 2010

Sina Ashouri (Persian: سینا عشوری; born 16 September 1988) is an Iranian retired footballer who last played for Tractor and Zob Ahan among other clubs in Persian Gulf Pro League.

== Club career ==
Ashouri has been with Zob Ahan since 2006 in their youth system, and in 2008 he was promoted to the first team. Before 2015–16, Ashouri was loaned out to Tractor to spend his military conscription there. After the end of the loan in the summer 2016, Ashouri permanently moved to Tractor until 26 January 2018.

=== Club career statistics ===
Last Update 7 March 2016

Club performance			League		Cup		Continental		Total	
Season	Club	League	Apps	Goals	Apps	Goals	Apps	Goals	Apps	Goals
Iran			League		Hazfi Cup		Asia		Total	
2008–09	Zob Ahan	Pro League	20	1	5	0	-	-	25	1
2009–10	Zob Ahan	Pro League	24	1	3	0	9	0	36	0
2010–11	Zob Ahan	Pro League	17	1	0	0	2	0	18	1
2011–12	Zob Ahan	Pro League	23	0	0	0	1	0	24	0
2012–13	Zob Ahan	Pro League	21	1	0	0	-	-	21	1
2013–14	Zob Ahan	Pro League	20	1	1	0	-	-	21	1
2014–15	Zob Ahan	Pro League	6	0	0	0	-	-	6	0
2015–16	Tractor	Pro League	21	0	2	0	8	0	31	0
Career total			152	5	11	0	20	0	183	5

- Assist Goals

Season	Team	Assists
10–11	Zob Ahan	0
11–12	Zob Ahan	0
12–13	Zob Ahan	1
13–14	Zob Ahan	0
14–15	Zob Ahan	0

== Honors ==
=== Club ===
Zob Ahan

- AFC Champions League : 2010 Runner up
- Persian Gulf Pro League : 2008-09 Runner up, 2009-10 Runner up
- Hazfi Cup (2) : 2008-09, 2014-15

Tractor

- Hazfi Cup : 2016-17 Runner up
- Shohada Cup (1): 2017
