= Mohammad Salsali =

Iranian footballer

Personal information
- Full name: Mohammad Salsali
- Date of birth: August 28, 1983 (age 43)
- Place of birth: Isfahan, Iran
- Position: Defender

Youth career
- 2001–2004: Zob Ahan

Senior career*
Years	Team	Apps	(Gls)
2004–2014	Zob Ahan	220	(11)
2004–2005	→ Aboomoslem (loan)	22	(1)
2014–2015	Giti Pasand	9	(0)
2015	Padideh	6	(0)
2016	Giti Pasand	13	(1)
- * Club domestic league appearances and goals

Mohammad Salsali (Persian: محمد صلصالی, born August 28, 1983, in Esfahan, Iran) is an Iranian football player.

== Club career ==
=== Club career statistics ===
Last Update 10 May 2013

Club performance			League		Cup		Continental		Total	
Season	Club	League	Apps	Goals	Apps	Goals	Apps	Goals	Apps	Goals
Iran			League		Hazfi Cup		Asia		Total	
2004–05	Aboomoslem	Pro League	22	1			–	–		
2005–06	Zob Ahan	Pro League	19	2			–	–		
2006–07	Zob Ahan	Pro League	19	3			–	–		
2007–08	Zob Ahan	Pro League	32	1			–	–		
2008–09	Zob Ahan	Pro League	31	3			–	–		
2009–10	Zob Ahan	Pro League	27	1			6	0		
2010–11	Zob Ahan	Pro League	12	1	1	0	7	0	20	1
2011–12	Zob Ahan	Pro League	30	0			1	0		
2012–13	Zob Ahan	Pro League	25	0	0	0	–	–	25	0
2013–14	Zob Ahan	Pro League	25	0	0	0	–	–	25	0
2014–15	Giti Pasand	Azadegan League	9	0			–	–	9	0
2014–15	Padideh	Pro League	6	0			–	–	6	0
2015–16	Giti Pasand	Azadegan League	13	1	0	0	–	–	13	1
Career total			270	13			14	0		

- Assist Goals

Season	Team	Assists
05–06	Zob Ahan	2
06–07	Zob Ahan	1
10–11	Zob Ahan	0
11–12	Zob Ahan	1

== Honours ==
Aboomoslem

- Hazfi Cup
  - Runners-up (1): 2004–05

Zob Ahan

- AFC Champions League
  - Runners-up (1): 2010
- Iran Pro League
  - Runners-up (2): 2008–09, 2009–10
- Hazfi Cup (1): 2008–09
