= Ghasem Haddadifar =

Iranian footballer

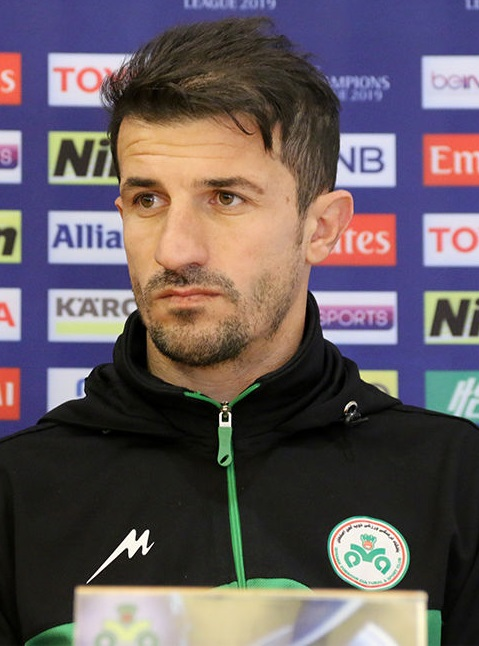

Personal information
- Full name: Ghasem Haddadifar
- Date of birth: 12 July 1983 (age 43)
- Place of birth: Isfahan, Iran
- Height: 1.80 m (5 ft 11 in)
- Position: Midfielder

Team information
- Current team: Iran U20 (manager)

Youth career
- 1996–2003: Zob Ahan

Senior career*
Years	Team	Apps	(Gls)
2003–2022	Zob Ahan	330	(15)
2005–2006	→ Sanat Naft Abadan (loan)	20	(2)
2012	→ Tractor (loan)	13	(1)

International career^{‡}
2010–2014	Iran	16	(0)

Managerial career
- 2022–2025: Zob Ahan (assistant)
- 2025–2026: Zob Ahan
- 2026–: Iran U20
- * Club domestic league appearances and goals as of 20:52, 12 May 2015 (UTC) ‡ National team caps and goals as of 15:00,1 June 2015 (UTC)

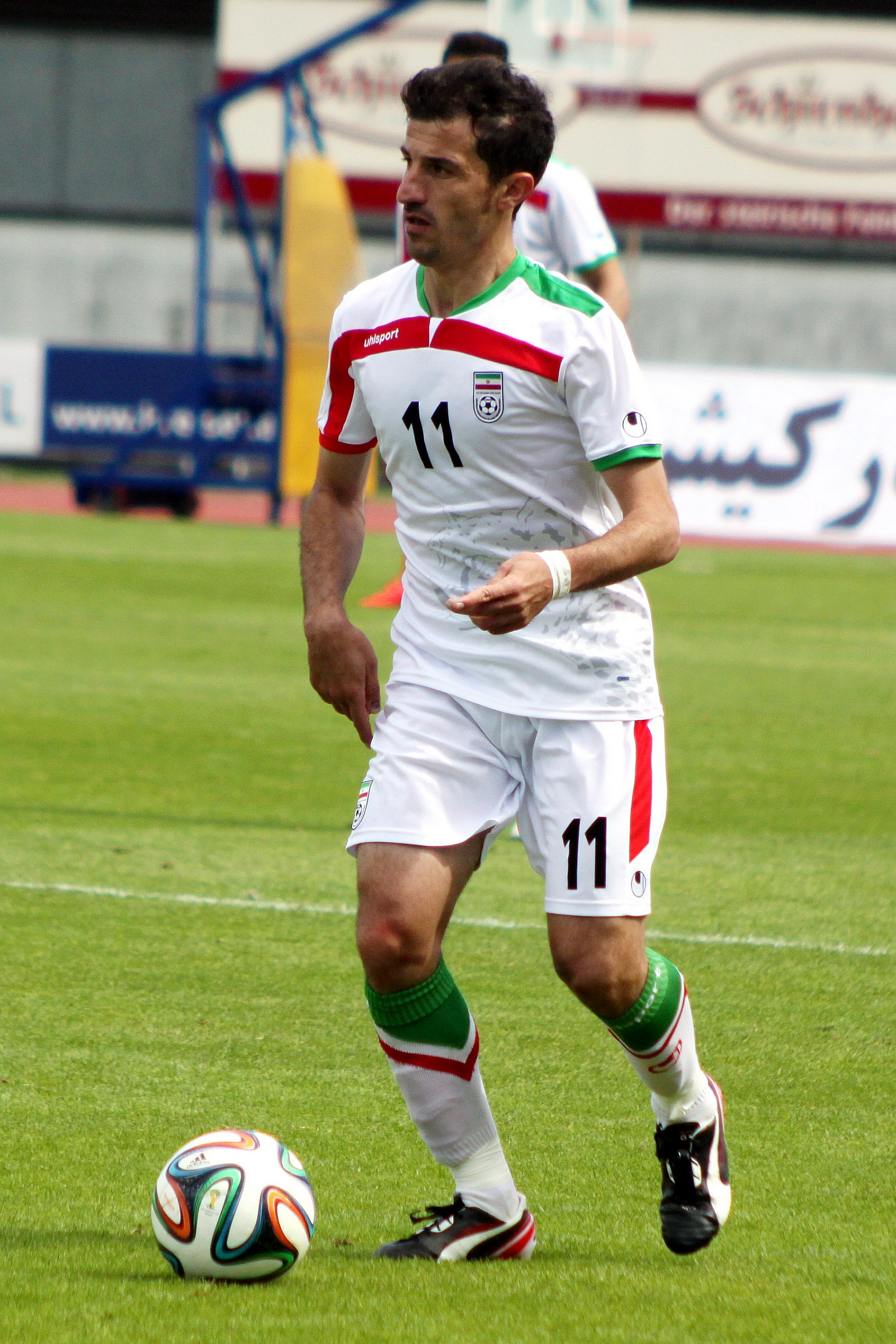
Haddadifar in a friendly-match against Angola in 2014

Ghasem Haddadifar (Persian: قاسم حدادی‌فر; born July 12, 1983) is an Iranian former footballer and current coach. He was also member of the Iranian national team and represented Iran at the 2014 FIFA World Cup.

In 2015 Haddadifar was named Iranian footballer of the season for the 2014–15 Persian Gulf Pro League season with Zob Ahan.

== Club career ==
=== Zob Ahan ===
Hadadifar joined Zob Ahan in 2003 after spending seven years with the club's youth teams. Haddadifar made his debut in the 2003–04 season making nine appearances and scoring once throughout his first season. The next year again Haddadifar played a minor role and mainly came on as a substitute in the season which Zob Ahan finished runners up in the league.

He has also been loaned out to Sanat Naft who played in the Azadegan League in 2005 to gain some experience and playing time. Haddadifar was a big part in Sanat Naft's successful season scoring twice in which the club finished third.

After returning to Zob Ahan in 2006 Haddadifar broke into the first team having an increasing role and helping Zob Ahan clinch an eight place finish. In the 2008–09 season Ghasem was Zob Ahan's best player scoring six times and leading Zob Ahan to another league runners-up and scoring twice in Zob Ahan's 5–2 Hazfi Cup final victory over Rah Ahan. The following season Haddadifar had continued success with Zob Ahan, again achieving a runners-up finish in the league. The same season with the help of Haddadifar goal in the semi-final against Al Hilal, Zob Ahan made the final of the AFC Champions League, becoming the second Iranian club to do so, but the club eventually lost to South Korean club Seongnam FC.

After struggling with injury in the 2011–12 season Haddadifar was loaned out to Tractor for the later half of the season. He helped Tractor achieve a runners-up finish and the club clinched an AFC Champions League spot for the first time in their history.

The following season after Haddadifar returned to Zob Ahan, the team had a poor season finishing in a relegation play-off, but the club managed to stay up after beating Pas Hamedan in a two-legged play-off. The 2013–14 season did not fare much better for Haddadifar or the club. Zob Ahan escaped relegation on goal difference after finishing thirteenth.

After the arrival of Yahya Golmohammadi as manager of Zob Ahan, both the club and Haddadifar were revived. Haddidifar had a stellar season, helping the club to win the Hazfi Cup again and earn a fourth-place finish in the league, which earned Zob Ahan a Champions League slot after a six-year absence. Haddidifar was recognized for his individual performances and was named to the 2014–15 Persian Gulf Pro League Team of the Year and was also recognized as the 2014–15 Persian Gulf Pro League Player of the Year.

=== Career statistics ===
Club performance			League		Cup		Continental		Total	
Season	Club	League	Apps	Goals	Apps	Goals	Apps	Goals	Apps	Goals
Iran			League		Hazfi Cup		Asia		Total	
2003–04	Zob Ahan	Pro League	7	1	2	0	-	-	9	1
2004–05	Zob Ahan	Pro League	10	0	1	0	-	-	11	0
2005–06	Sanat Naft	Division 1	20	2	0	0	-	-	20	2
2006–07	Zob Ahan	Pro League	23	0	1	0	-	-	24	0
2007–08	Zob Ahan	Pro League	24	0	2	0	-	-	26	0
2008–09	Zob Ahan	Pro League	23	4	6	2	-	-	29	6
2009–10	Zob Ahan	Pro League	32	3	5	0	5	1	42	4
2010–11	Zob Ahan	Pro League	30	1	1	0	6	1	37	2
2011–12	Zob Ahan	Pro League	8	0	0	0	0	0	8	0
2011–12	Tractor	Pro League	13	1	0	0	-	-	13	1
2012–13	Zob Ahan	Pro League	28	2	3	0	-	-	31	2
2013–14	Zob Ahan	Pro League	28	2	2	0	-	-	30	2
2014–15	Zob Ahan	Pro League	27	0	5	1	-	-	32	1
2015–16	Zob Ahan	Pro League	24	0	4	0	8	0	36	0
2016–17	Zob Ahan	Pro League	4	0	0	0	3	0	7	0
2017–18	Zob Ahan	Pro League	15	1	0	0	8	1	23	2
2018–19	Zob Ahan	Pro League	22	0	1	0	8	0	31	0
2019–20	Zob Ahan	Pro League	25	1	1	0	0	0	26	1
2019–20	Zob Ahan	Pro League	16	0	1	0	0	0	17	1
Career total			379	18	35	3	38	2	452	24

== International career ==
In 2010, Hadadifar received his first cap for Iran in a friendly match against Armenia. On 1 June 2014, he was called into Iran's 2014 FIFA World Cup squad by Carlos Queiroz.

== Honours ==
Zob Ahan

- AFC Champions League runner-up: 2010
- Persian Gulf Pro League runner-up: 2004–05, 2008–09, 2009–10
- Hazfi Cup: 2002–03, 2008–09, 2014–15, 2015–16
- Iranian Super Cup: 2016

Tractor

- Persian Gulf Pro League runner-up: 2011–12

Individual

- Iranian Footballer of the Year: 2015
- Persian Gulf Pro League Team of the Year: 2014–15

== Personal life ==
His father was an employee of Zob Ahan Isfahan Steel Company, and he was born in Zob Ahan Hospital. His brother Alireza is also a footballer and is his teammate.

Sporting positions
Preceded by Mehdi Rajabzadeh	Zob Ahan Isfahan F.C. captain 2018–2022	Succeeded by Mohammad Ghoreishi
