= Abbas Ghasemi =

Iranian footballer (born 1982)

Personal information
- Full name: Abbas Ghasemi Dastjerdi
- Date of birth: 23 October 1982 (age 44)
- Place of birth: Iran
- Position: Goalkeeper

Team information
- Current team: Paykan
- Number: 22

Youth career
- 1999–2001: Zob Ahan

Senior career*
Years	Team	Apps	(Gls)
2001–2011	Zob Ahan	65	(0)
2003–2004	→ Sepahan (loan)	3	(0)
2013–	Paykan	5	(0)

International career^{‡}
2000	Iran U17		
2001	Iran U20	3	(0)
2003	Iran U23	0	(0)
2005	Iran B	0	(0)
- * Club domestic league appearances and goals as of 1 June 2010 ‡ National team caps and goals as of 13 March 2010

Abbas Ghasemi (Persian: عباس قاسمی; born October 23, 1982) is an Iranian footballer who currently plays for Paykan in Iran Pro League.

== Career ==
Ghasemi has spent his entire career with Zob Ahan. He was suspended for two years from football in 2011 because of doping.

=== Club career statistics ===
As of 26 August 2011

Club performance			League		Cup		Continental		Total	
Season	Club	League	Apps	Goals	Apps	Goals	Apps	Goals	Apps	Goals
Iran			League		Hazfi Cup		Asia		Total	
2001–02	Zob Ahan	Persian Gulf Cup					-	-		
2002–03	Zob Ahan	Persian Gulf Cup	16	0			-	-		
2003–04	Sepahan	Persian Gulf Cup	3	0						
2004–05	Zob Ahan	Persian Gulf Cup	0	0		0	-	-		0
2005–06	Zob Ahan	Persian Gulf Cup	20	0		0	-	-		0
2006–07	Zob Ahan	Persian Gulf Cup	15	0		0	-	-		0
2007–08	Zob Ahan	Persian Gulf Cup	2	0		0	-	-		0
2008–09	Zob Ahan	Persian Gulf Cup	5	0		0	-	-		0
2009–10	Zob Ahan	Persian Gulf Cup	7	0		0	1	0		0
2010–11	Zob Ahan	Persian Gulf Cup	0	0	1	0	0	0	1	0
Total	Iran		68	0		0	1	0		0
Total	Career total			0		0	1	0		0
