= Majid Noormohammadi =

Iranian footballer (born 1978)

Personal information
- Full name: Majid Noormohammadi
- Date of birth: September 16, 1978 (age 48)
- Place of birth: Babol, Iran
- Position: Midfielder

Team information
- Current team: Padideh Shandiz

Senior career*
Years	Team	Apps	(Gls)
2003–2005	Shamoushak	?	(1)
2005–2007	Aboomoslem	46	(2)
2007–2010	Rah Ahan	78	(9)
2010–2011	Zob Ahan	17	(0)
2011–2012	Aluminium	26	(5)
2012–2013	Aboomoslem	15	(3)
2013–	Padideh Shandiz	11	(1)
- * Club domestic league appearances and goals

Majid Noormohammadi (born September 16, 1978) is an Iranian Football player who currently plays for Padideh Shandiz in Azadegan League.

== Professional ==
Noormohammadi had played for Zob Ahan from 2010 to 2011.

=== Club Career Statistics ===
Last Update 10 May 2013

Club performance			League		Cup		Continental		Total	
Season	Club	League	Apps	Goals	Apps	Goals	Apps	Goals	Apps	Goals
Iran			League		Hazfi Cup		Asia		Total	
2003–04	Shamoushak	Persian Gulf Cup	9	1			-	-		
2004–05	Shamoushak	Azadegan League					-	-		
2005–06	Aboomoslem	Persian Gulf Cup	25	1			-	-		
2006–07	Aboomoslem	Persian Gulf Cup	21	1	1	0	-	-	22	1
2007–08	Rah Ahan	Persian Gulf Cup	27	2			-	-		
2008–09	Rah Ahan	Persian Gulf Cup	20	2			-	-		
2009–10	Rah Ahan	Persian Gulf Cup	31	5	1	0	-	-	31	5
2010–11	Zob Ahan	Persian Gulf Cup	16	0	0	0	2	0	18	0
Total	Iran						2	0		
Career total							2	0		

- Assist Goals

Season	Team	Assists
10–11	Zob Ahan	1
