= Mojtaba Zarei =

Iranian footballer

Personal information
- Full name: Mojtaba Zareshooli
- Date of birth: 20 February 1983 (age 43)
- Place of birth: marvdasht, Iran
- Height: 1.80 m (5 ft 11 in)
- Position: Deep-lying striker

Team information
- Current team: sahrdari mahshahr
- Number: 30

Senior career*
Years	Team	Apps	(Gls)
2004–2005	Aboomoslem	3	(0)
2005–2008	Moghavemat Sepasi	60	(5)
2008–2009	Rah Ahan	32	(8)
2009–2011	Persepolis	44	(3)
2011–2012	Naft Tehran	16	(5)
2012–2013	Gahar Zagros	8	(0)
2013	Aluminium	4	(0)
2013–2014	Fajr Sepasi		
2014–	Paykan		

International career^{‡}
2009–2010	Iran	2	(0)
- * Club domestic league appearances and goals as of 10 May 2013 ‡ National team caps and goals as of 5 September 2009

Mojtaba Zarei (Persian: مجتبی زارعی, born February 20, 1983) is an Iranian footballer who last played for Peykan and Perspolis among other clubs in Persian Gulf Pro League.

== Club career ==
After playing for Moghavemat for 3 seasons and playing for Rah Ahan for one season, at the end of the 2008/09 season he moved to Persepolis on a two-year deal.

== International career ==
He started his international career in August 2009 under Afshin Ghotbi against Bahrain.

== Career statistics ==
- Last Update: 20 January 2012

Club performance			League		Cup		Continental		Total	
Season	Club	League	Apps	Goals	Apps	Goals	Apps	Goals	Apps	Goals
Iran			League		Hazfi Cup		Asia		Total	
2004–05	Aboomoslem	Pro League	3	0			-	-		
2005–06	Fajr Sepasi	Pro League	17	2			-	-		
2006–07	Fajr Sepasi	Pro League	15	1	1	0	-	-	16	1
2007–08	Fajr Sepasi	Pro League	28	2	0	0	-	-	28	2
2008–09	Rah Ahan	Pro League	32	8	6	5	-	-	38	13
2009–10	Persepolis	Pro League	30	2	5	0	-	-	35	2
2010–11	Persepolis	Pro League	14	1	0	0	2	0	16	1
2011–12	Naft Tehran	Pro League	16	5	1	1	-	-	17	6
Career total			155	21			2	0		

== Honours ==
- Hazfi Cup
  - Winner: 2
    - 2009/10 with Persepolis
    - 2010/11 with Persepolis
  - Runner Up:1
    - 2008/09 with Rah Ahan
