= Ahmad Mohammadpour =

Iranian footballer

Personal information
- Full name: Seyed Ahmad Mohammadpour
- Date of birth: 1 February 1980 (age 46)
- Place of birth: Iran
- Position: Left back

Youth career
- –2000: Zob Ahan

Senior career*
Years	Team	Apps	(Gls)
2000–2005	Zob Ahan	39	(1)
2005–2007	Sepahan	28	(2)
2007–2011	Zob Ahan	47	(0)
2011–2012	Aboumoslem	20	(8)
2012–2013	Zob Ahan	10	(0)
- * Club domestic league appearances and goals

Ahmad Mohammadpour (Persian: احمد محمدپور; born 1 February 1980) is an Iranian former footballer.

== Club career ==
Mohammadpour joined Zob Ahan in 2007 after spending the previous two seasons at rivals Sepahan.

=== Club career statistics ===
As of 24 August 2012

Club performance			League		Cup		Continental		Total	
Season	Club	League	Apps	Goals	Apps	Goals	Apps	Goals	Apps	Goals
Iran			League		Hazfi Cup		Asia		Total	
2004–05	Zob Ahan	Pro League	24	1			-	-		
2005–06	Sepahan	Pro League	19	2			-	-		
2006–07	Sepahan	Pro League	9	0				0		
2007–08	Zob Ahan	Pro League	23	0			-	-		
2008–09	Zob Ahan	Pro League	4	0			-	-		
2009–10	Zob Ahan	Pro League	2	0			4	0		
2010–11	Zob Ahan	Pro League	11	0	1	0	2	0	14	0
2011–12	Aboumoslem	Division 1	20	8			-	-		
2012–13	Zob Ahan	Pro League	3	0	0	0	-	-	3	0
Career total			117	11				0		

- Assist Goals

Season	Team	Assists
10–11	Zob Ahan	1
