= Shahin Kheiri =

Iranian footballer

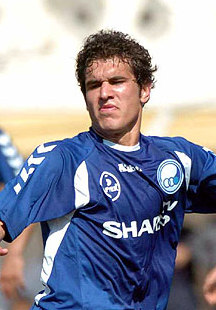

Personal information
- Full name: Shahin Kheiri
- Date of birth: 20 April 1980 (age 46)
- Place of birth: Iran
- Position: Midfielder

Senior career*
Years	Team	Apps	(Gls)
- Sepahan
2004–2006	Esteghlal	31	(1)
2006–2008	Mes	39	(0)
2008–2009	Zob Ahan	28	(0)
2009–2010	Sepahan	32	(0)
2010–2011	Zob Ahan	23	(0)
2011–2012	Naft Tehran	15	(0)
- * Club domestic league appearances and goals as of 6 December 2011 (UTC) ‡ National team caps and goals as of 27 March 2010

Shahin Kheiri (born April 20, 1980) is an Iranian footballer who plays for Naft Tehran F.C. in the IPL.

== Club career ==
Kheiri joined Sepahan F.C. in 2009.

=== Club career statistics ===
As of 6 December 2011

Club performance			League		Cup		Continental		Total	
Season	Club	League	Apps	Goals	Apps	Goals	Apps	Goals	Apps	Goals
Iran			League		Hazfi Cup		Asia		Total	
2004–05	Esteghlal	Pro League	17	1			-	-		
2005–06	Esteghlal	Pro League	14	0			-	-		
2006–07	Mes	Pro League	21	0			-	-		
2007–08	Mes	Pro League	18	0			-	-		
2008–09	Zob Ahan	Pro League	28	0			-	-		
2009–10	Sepahan	Pro League	32	0			6	0		
2010–11	Zob Ahan	Pro League	23	0	1	0	12	1	36	1
2011–12	Naft Tehran	Pro League	3	0	0	0	-	-	3	0
Career total			156	1			18	1		

- Assist Goals

Season	Team	Assists
10–11	Zob Ahan	1
11-12	Naft Tehran	0

== Honours ==
=== Club ===
- Iran's Premier Football League
  - Winner: 2
    - 2005/06 with Esteghlal
    - 2009/10 with Sepahan
