= Alireza Hadadifar =

Iranian footballer (born 1987)

Personal information
- Date of birth: 6 August 1987 (age 39)
- Place of birth: Iran
- Position: Midfielder

Youth career
- Zob Ahan

Senior career*
Years	Team	Apps	(Gls)
2008–2013	Zob Ahan	34	(1)
- * Club domestic league appearances and goals

Alireza Hadadifar (Persian: علیرضا حدادی فر; born 6 August 1987) is an Iranian former footballer.

== Club career ==
Hadahifar was with Zob Ahan in 2008.

=== Club career statistics ===
As of 24 August 2011

Club performance			League		Cup		Continental		Total	
Season	Club	League	Apps	Goals	Apps	Goals	Apps	Goals	Apps	Goals
Iran			League		Hazfi Cup		Asia		Total	
2008–09	Zob Ahan	Pro League	7	0			-	-		
2009–10	Zob Ahan	Pro League	1	0			0	0		
2010–11	Zob Ahan	Pro League	7	0	0	0	1	0	8	0
2011–12	Zob Ahan	Pro League	11	0			0	0		
2012–13	Zob Ahan	Pro League	0	0	0	0	-	-	0	0
Career total			26	0			1	0		

- Assist Goals

Season	Team	Assists
10–11	Zob Ahan	0
11-12	Zob Ahan	0
