= Igor Castro =

Brazilian footballer (born 1981)

Personal information
- Full name: Igor José Marigo de Castro
- Date of birth: 25 August 1981 (age 45)
- Place of birth: Muriaé, Brazil
- Height: 1.74 m (5 ft 9 in)
- Position: Striker

Senior career*
Years	Team	Apps	(Gls)
2002–2003	Flamengo		
2003–2005	Brasiliense	37	(11)
2005–2006	São Caetano	8	(0)
2006–2007	Avaí	12	(2)
2007–2008	Coritiba	1	(1)
2008–2012	Zob Ahan	121	(30)
2012–2013	Yokohama	7	(2)
2013	Rah Ahan	9	(2)
2014–	Brasília	0	(0)
- * Club domestic league appearances and goals as of 10 May 2013 ‡ National team caps and goals as of 1 September 2011

Igor José Marigo de Castro (born 25 August 1981), commonly known as Igor or Igor Castro is a Brazilian footballer.

== Club career ==
=== Brasiliense ===
In the 2005 season Igor Castro scored 11 goals in 36 games for Brasiliense. He also played for São Caetano in the Campeonato Brasileiro.

=== Zob Ahan ===
He moved to the Iranian club Zob Ahan in the summer of 2008 and was one of the top scorers of the league in his first season with 16 goals. Castro lead Zob Ahan to two straight Iran Pro League second-place finishes in 2009 and 2010. With the help of Castro Zob Ahan also won the Hazfi Cup in 2009. In 2010, he was one of the key players in Zob Ahan's run to the AFC Champions League final which they eventually lost.

=== Retirement ===
After spending 4 seasons in the Iran Pro League with Zob Ahan, in 2012 he transferred to Japanese club Yokohama F.C. but after an unsuccessful half-season he moved back to Iran once again but this time to Rah Ahan under coach Ali Daei. He was released at the end of the season by the club and later retired from professional football.

== Club career statistics ==
- Last Update: 20 March 2013

Club performance			League		Cup		Continental		Total	
Season	Club	League	Apps	Goals	Apps	Goals	Apps	Goals	Apps	Goals
Brazil			League		Copa do Brasil		South America		Total	
2005	Brasiliense	Série A	37	11	2	1	-	-	39	12
2006	São Caetano	Série A	8	0	1	0	-	-	9	0
2006	Avaí	Série B	12	2	0	0	-	-	12	2
2007	Coritiba	Série B	1	1	2	0	-	-	3	1
Iran			League		Hazfi Cup		Asia		Total	
2008–09	Zob Ahan	Persian Gulf Cup	30	16	7	1	-	-	37	17
2009–10	Zob Ahan	Persian Gulf Cup	30	5	4	1	11	4	45	10
2010–11	Zob Ahan	Persian Gulf Cup	34	5	0	0	9	4	32	9
2011–12	Zob Ahan	Persian Gulf Cup	27	4	1	0	1	0	28	4
Japan			League		Emperor's Cup		Asia		Total	
2012	Yokohama	J. League	7	2	1	0	-	-	8	2
Iran			League		Hazfi Cup		Asia		Total	
2012–13	Rah Ahan	Persian Gulf Cup	9	2	0	0	-	-	9	2
Total	Brazil		58	14	5	1	-	-	63	15
Total	Iran		130	32	12	2	20	10	150	44
Total	Japan		7	2	1	0	0	0	8	2
Career total			195	47	18	3	20	10	233	57

- Assist Goals

Season	Team	Assists
08/09	Zob Ahan	0
09/10	Zob Ahan	1
10/11	Zob Ahan	3
11/12	Zob Ahan	1
