= Esmaeil Farhadi =

Iranian football player

Personal information
- Date of birth: 26 July 1982 (age 44)
- Place of birth: Esfahan, Iran
- Height: 1.79 m (5 ft 10 in)
- Position: Striker

Youth career
- 1999–2000: Polyacryl Esfahan

Senior career*
Years	Team	Apps	(Gls)
2000–2005	Polyacryl Esfahan	17	(6)
2005–2015	Zob Ahan	280	(44)
2015–2016	Giti Pasand	18	(3)
2016–2017	Oxin Alborz	23	(3)
2017–2018	Gostaresh Foolad	19	(1)
2018–2019	Machine Sazi	8	(0)
2019–2020	Atrak Bojnourd		
2020–2021	Shams Azar		
- * Club domestic league appearances and goals

Esmaeil Farhadi (Persian: اسماعیل فرهادی; born 26 July 1982) is an Iranian former football player.

== Club career ==
Farhadi played for Zob Ahan in the 2010 AFC Champions League group stage.

=== Club career statistics ===
As of 26 December 2017

Club performance			League		Cup		Continental		Total	
Season	Club	League	Apps	Goals	Apps	Goals	Apps	Goals	Apps	Goals
Iran			League		Hazfi Cup		Asia		Total	
2005–06	Zob Ahan	Pro League	18	7	0	0	-	-	18	7
2006–07	Zob Ahan	Pro League	24	2	0	0	-	-	24	2
2007–08	Zob Ahan	Pro League	33	9	0	0	-	-	33	9
2008–09	Zob Ahan	Pro League	32	8	0	0	-	-	32	8
2009–10	Zob Ahan	Pro League	33	6	0	0	12	1	33	6
2010–11	Zob Ahan	Pro League	33	1	1	0	8	1	42	2
2011–12	Zob Ahan	Pro League	31	1	0	0	1	0	31	1
2012–13	Zob Ahan	Pro League	33	7	2	1	-	-	19	5
2013–14	Zob Ahan	Pro League	24	2	2	0	-	-	26	2
2014–15	Zob Ahan	Pro League	19	1	2	0	-	-	21	1
2015-16	Giti Pasand	Azadegan League	18	3	0	0	-	-	18	3
2016-17	Oxin Alborz	Azadegan League	23	3	1	0	-	-	24	3
2017-18	Gostaresh Foulad	Pro League	19	1	2	0	-	-	21	1
Career total			305	47	8	1	21	2	329	50

- Assist Goals

Season	Team	Assists
07–08	Zob Ahan	3
08–09	Zob Ahan	9
09–10	Zob Ahan	6
10–11	Zob Ahan	4
11-12	Zob Ahan	0

== Honours ==
=== Club ===
Zob Ahan

- Hazfi Cup (2): 2008–09, 2014–15
- Iran Pro League Runner-up: 2008–09, 2009–10
- AFC Champions League Runner-up: 2010

=== Individual ===
- Iran's Premier Football League
  - 2008/09 Top Goalassistant with 9 assists, shared with Mohammad Reza Khalatbari and Ivan Petrović, Zob Ahan
