= Saudi Arabian football clubs in Asian competitions =

The Saudi Pro League clubs in the AFC Champions League.This details the participation and performances in the competition since its based at 2002 as a result of the merger between the Asian Club Championship, the FIFA Club World Cup and AFC Champions League Elite.

== Overview ==
=== Results ===
Q : Qualified, PO : Qualifying play-off, GS : Group stage, R16 : Round of 16, QF : Quarter-finals, SF : Semi-finals, RU : Runners-up, W : Winners

| Team | Qualified | 2003 | 2004 | 2005 | 2006 | 2007 | 2008 | 2009 | 2010 | 2011 | 2012 | 2013 | 2014 | 2015 | 2016 | 2017 | 2018 | 2019 | 2020 | 2021 | 2022 |
|---|---|---|---|---|---|---|---|---|---|---|---|---|---|---|---|---|---|---|---|---|---|
| Al-Hilal | 17 | GS | GS | – | GS | QF | – | R16 | SF | R16 | QF | R16 | RU | SF | R16 | RU | GS | W | GS | W | Q |
| Al-Ahli | 13 | PO | – | QF | – | – | GS | – | GS | – | RU | QF | – | R16 | GS | QF | R16 | R16 | QF | GS | – |
| Al-Ittihad | 11 | – | W | W | QF | – | GS | RU | GS | SF | SF | – | QF | – | GS | – | – | QF | – | – | – |
| Al-Shabab | 9 | – | – | GS | QF | GS | – | R16 | SF | R16 | – | QF | R16 | GS | – | – | – | – | – | – | Q |
| Al-Nassr | 6 | – | – | – | – | – | – | – | – | R16 | – | – | – | GS | GS | – | – | QF | SF | SF | – |
| Al-Ettifaq | 3 | – | – | – | – | – | – | R16 | – | – | PO | GS | – | – | – | – | – | – | – | – | – |
| Al-Taawoun | 3 | – | – | – | – | – | – | – | – | – | – | – | – | – | – | GS | – | – | R16 | – | GS |
| Al-Fateh | 2 | – | – | – | – | – | – | – | – | – | – | – | GS | – | – | GS | – | – | – | – | – |
| Al-Faisaly | 1 | – | – | – | – | – | – | – | – | – | – | – | – | – | – | – | – | – | – | – | Q |
| Al-Wehda | 1 | – | – | – | – | – | – | – | – | – | – | – | – | – | – | – | – | – | – | PO | – |

=== Statistics by club ===
As of 24 November 2019

This table does not include qualifying round matches.

| # | Team | Pld | W | D | L | GF | GA | GD | Pts | Best Finish |
|---|---|---|---|---|---|---|---|---|---|---|
| 1 | Al-Hilal | 129 | 60 | 37 | 32 | 204 | 134 | +70 | 217 | Winners |
| 2 | Al-Ittihad | 92 | 49 | 21 | 22 | 176 | 99 | +77 | 168 | Winners |
| 3 | Al-Ahli | 82 | 37 | 21 | 24 | 138 | 99 | +39 | 132 | Runners-up |
| 4 | Al-Shabab | 67 | 33 | 12 | 22 | 90 | 76 | +14 | 111 | Semi-finals |
| 5 | Al-Nassr | 29 | 10 | 8 | 11 | 41 | 45 | −4 | 38 | Quarter-finals |
| 6 | Al-Ettifaq | 13 | 6 | 1 | 6 | 22 | 15 | +7 | 19 | Round of 16 |
| 7 | Al-Fateh | 12 | 1 | 5 | 6 | 10 | 20 | −10 | 8 | Group stage |
| 8 | Al-Taawoun | 6 | 1 | 2 | 3 | 7 | 12 | −5 | 5 | Group stage |

=== Statistics by season ===
As of 24 May 2016

| Season | Pld | W | D | L | GF | GA | GD | Pts |
|---|---|---|---|---|---|---|---|---|
| 2003 | 3 | 1 | 0 | 2 | 4 | 6 | −2 | 3 |
| 2004 | 16 | 9 | 4 | 3 | 32 | 17 | +15 | 31 |
| 2005 | 20 | 13 | 3 | 4 | 48 | 22 | +26 | 42 |
| 2006 | 16 | 8 | 2 | 6 | 23 | 24 | −1 | 26 |
| 2007 | 12 | 5 | 5 | 2 | 15 | 5 | +10 | 20 |
| 2008 | 12 | 3 | 4 | 5 | 11 | 12 | −1 | 13 |
| 2009 | 31 | 17 | 8 | 6 | 61 | 29 | +32 | 59 |
| 2010 | 34 | 15 | 5 | 14 | 58 | 44 | +14 | 50 |
| 2011 | 32 | 14 | 7 | 11 | 50 | 38 | +12 | 49 |
| 2012 | 32 | 17 | 7 | 8 | 58 | 37 | +21 | 58 |
| 2013 | 34 | 17 | 9 | 8 | 53 | 34 | +19 | 60 |
| 2014 | 38 | 16 | 8 | 14 | 50 | 45 | +5 | 56 |
| 2015 | 32 | 13 | 10 | 9 | 46 | 35 | +11 | 49 |
| 2016 | 26 | 9 | 8 | 9 | 35 | 34 | +1 | 35 |
| Total | 338 | 157 | 80 | 101 | 544 | 382 | +162 | 551 |

== Statistics by Saudi club ==
| Match won | Match drawn | Match lost |

=== Al-Hilal ===
Al-Hilal results
| Season | Round | Result | Opponent | Venue |
|---|---|---|---|---|
| 2003 | Group stage | 0–1 | (United Arab Emirates) Al Ain | Al Ain, UAE |
| 2003 | Group stage | 3–2 | (Iran) Esteghlal | Al Ain, UAE |
| 2003 | Group stage | 1–3 | (Qatar) Al Sadd | Al Ain, UAE |
| 2004 | Group stage | 0–0 | (United Arab Emirates) Al-Sharjah | Riyadh, Saudi Arabia |
| 2004 | Group stage | 2–1 | (Iraq) Al Shorta | Kuwait City, Kuwait |
| 2004 | Group stage | 2–0 | (Iraq) Al Shorta | Riyadh, Saudi Arabia |
| 2004 | Group stage | 2–5 | (United Arab Emirates) Al-Sharjah | Sharjah, UAE |
| 2006 | Group stage | 0–2 | (United Arab Emirates) Al Ain | Al Ain, UAE |
| 2006 | Group stage | 3–1 | (Iraq) Al-Mina'a | Riyadh, Saudi Arabia |
| 2006 | Group stage | 5–0 | (Uzbekistan) Mashʼal | Riyadh, Saudi Arabia |
| 2006 | Group stage | 1–2 | (Uzbekistan) Mashʼal | Qarshi, Uzbekistan |
| 2006 | Group stage | 2–1 | (United Arab Emirates) Al Ain | Riyadh, Saudi Arabia |
| 2006 | Group stage | 1–1 | (Iraq) Al-Mina'a | Kuwait City, Kuwait |
| 2007 | Group stage | 1–1 | Al Kuwait | Riyadh, Saudi Arabia |
| 2007 | Group stage | 2–0 | (Uzbekistan) Pakhtakor | Tashkent, Uzbekistan |
| 2007 | Group stage | 2–0 | (Uzbekistan) Pakhtakor | Riyadh, Saudi Arabia |
| 2007 | Group stage | 0–0 | Al Kuwait | Kuwait City, Kuwait |
| 2007 | Quarter-final | 0–0 | (United Arab Emirates) Al-Wahda | Abu Dhabi, UAE |
| 2007 | Quarter-final | 1–1 | (United Arab Emirates) Al-Wahda | Riyadh, Saudi Arabia |
| 2009 | Group stage | 1–1 | (Iran) Saba Qom | Riyadh, Saudi Arabia |
| 2009 | Group stage | 1–1 | (Uzbekistan) Pakhtakor | Tashkent, Uzbekistan |
| 2009 | Group stage | 2–1 | (United Arab Emirates) Al-Ahli | Riyadh, Saudi Arabia |
| 2009 | Group stage | 3–1 | (United Arab Emirates) Al-Ahli | Dubai, UAE |
| 2009 | Group stage | 1–0 | (Iran) Saba Qom | Qom, Iran |
| 2009 | Group stage | 2–0 | (Uzbekistan) Pakhtakor | Riyadh, Saudi Arabia |
| 2009 | Round of 16 | 0–0(3-4p) | (Qatar) Umm Salal | Riyadh, Saudi Arabia |
| 2010 | Group stage | 3–0 | (Qatar) Al Sadd | Doha, Qatar |
| 2010 | Group stage | 3–1 | (Iran) Mes Kerman | Riyadh, Saudi Arabia |
| 2010 | Group stage | 1–1 | (United Arab Emirates) Al-Ahli | Riyadh, Saudi Arabia |
| 2010 | Group stage | 3–2 | (United Arab Emirates) Al-Ahli | Dubai, UAE |
| 2010 | Group stage | 0–0 | (Qatar) Al Sadd | Riyadh, Saudi Arabia |
| 2010 | Group stage | 1–3 | (Iran) Mes Kerman | Kerman, Iran |
| 2010 | Round of 16 | 3–0 | (Uzbekistan) Bunyodkor | Riyadh, Saudi Arabia |
| 2010 | Quarter-final | 3–0 | (Qatar) Al-Gharafa | Riyadh, Saudi Arabia |
| 2010 | Quarter-final | 2–4 | (Qatar) Al-Gharafa | Doha, Qatar |
| 2010 | Semi-final | 0–1 | (Iran) Zob Ahan | Isfahan, Iran |
| 2010 | Semi-final | 0–1 | (Iran) Zob Ahan | Riyadh, Saudi Arabia |
| 2011 | Group stage | 1–2 | (Iran) Sepahan | Riyadh, Saudi Arabia |
| 2011 | Group stage | 1–0 | (Qatar) Al-Gharafa | Doha, Qatar |
| 2011 | Group stage | 3–1 | (United Arab Emirates) Al Jazira | Riyadh, Saudi Arabia |
| 2011 | Group stage | 3–2 | (United Arab Emirates) Al Jazira | Abu Dhabi, UAE |
| 2011 | Group stage | 1–1 | (Iran) Sepahan | Isfahan, Iran |
| 2011 | Group stage | 2–0 | (Qatar) Al-Gharafa | Riyadh, Saudi Arabia |
| 2011 | Round of 16 | 1–3 | (Saudi Arabia) Al-Ittihad | Jeddah, Saudi Arabia |
| 2012 | Group stage | 1–1 | (Iran) Persepolis | Riyadh, Saudi Arabia |
| 2012 | Group stage | 3–3 | (Qatar) Al-Gharafa | Doha, Qatar |
| 2012 | Group stage | 1–1 | (United Arab Emirates) Al Shabab | Dubai, UAE |
| 2012 | Group stage | 2–1 | (United Arab Emirates) Al Shabab | Riyadh, Saudi Arabia |
| 2012 | Group stage | 1–0 | (Iran) Persepolis | Tehran, Iran |
| 2012 | Group stage | 2–1 | (Qatar) Al-Gharafa | Riyadh, Saudi Arabia |
| 2012 | Round of 16 | 7–1 | (United Arab Emirates) Baniyas | Riyadh, Saudi Arabia |
| 2012 | Quarter-final | 0–1 | (South Korea) Ulsan Hyundai | Ulsan, South Korea |
| 2012 | Quarter-final | 0–4 | (South Korea) Ulsan Hyundai | Riyadh, Saudi Arabia |
| 2013 | Group stage | 1–3 | (United Arab Emirates) Al Ain | Al Ain, UAE |
| 2013 | Group stage | 3–1 | (Qatar) Al Rayyan | Riyadh, Saudi Arabia |
| 2013 | Group stage | 1–2 | (Iran) Esteghlal | Riyadh, Saudi Arabia |
| 2013 | Group stage | 1–0 | (Iran) Esteghlal | Tehran, Iran |
| 2013 | Group stage | 2–0 | (United Arab Emirates) Al Ain | Riyadh, Saudi Arabia |
| 2013 | Group stage | 2–0 | (Qatar) Al Rayyan | Al Rayyan, Qatar |
| 2013 | Round of 16 | 0–1 | (Qatar) Lekhwiya | Riyadh, Saudi Arabia |
| 2013 | Round of 16 | 2–2 | (Qatar) Lekhwiya | Doha, Qatar |
| 2014 | Group stage | 2–2 | (United Arab Emirates) Al-Ahli | Riyadh, Saudi Arabia |
| 2014 | Group stage | 2–3 | (Iran) Sepahan | Isfahan, Iran |
| 2014 | Group stage | 2–2 | (Qatar) Al Sadd | Doha, Qatar |
| 2014 | Group stage | 5–0 | (Qatar) Al Sadd | Riyadh, Saudi Arabia |
| 2014 | Group stage | 0–0 | (United Arab Emirates) Al-Ahli | Dubai, UAE |
| 2014 | Group stage | 1–0 | (Iran) Sepahan | Riyadh, Saudi Arabia |
| 2014 | Round of 16 | 1–0 | (Uzbekistan) Bunyodkor | Tashkent, Uzbekistan |
| 2014 | Round of 16 | 3–0 | (Uzbekistan) Bunyodkor | Riyadh, Saudi Arabia |
| 2014 | Quarter-final | 1–0 | (Qatar) Al Sadd | Riyadh, Saudi Arabia |
| 2014 | Quarter-final | 0–0 | (Qatar) Al Sadd | Doha, Qatar |
| 2014 | Semi-final | 3–0 | (United Arab Emirates) Al Ain | Riyadh, Saudi Arabia |
| 2014 | Semi-final | 1–2 | (United Arab Emirates) Al Ain | Al Ain, UAE |
| 2014 | Final | 0–1 | (Australia) W.S. Wanderers | Sydney, Australia |
| 2014 | Final | 0–0 | (Australia) W.S. Wanderers | Riyadh, Saudi Arabia |
| 2015 | Group stage | 3–1 | (Uzbekistan) Lokomotiv | Riyadh, Saudi Arabia |
| 2015 | Group stage | 0–1 | (Qatar) Al Sadd | Doha, Qatar |
| 2015 | Group stage | 0–0 | (Iran) Foolad | Ahwaz, Iran |
| 2015 | Group stage | 2–0 | (Iran) Foolad | Riyadh, Saudi Arabia |
| 2015 | Group stage | 2–1 | (Uzbekistan) Lokomotiv | Tashkent, Uzbekistan |
| 2015 | Group stage | 2–1 | (Qatar) Al Sadd | Riyadh, Saudi Arabia |
| 2015 | Round of 16 | 0–1 | (Iran) Persepolis | Tehran, Iran |
| 2015 | Round of 16 | 3–0 | (Iran) Persepolis | Riyadh, Saudi Arabia |
| 2015 | Quarter-final | 4–1 | (Qatar) Lekhwiya | Riyadh, Saudi Arabia |
| 2015 | Quarter-final | 2–2 | (Qatar) Lekhwiya | Doha, Qatar |
| 2015 | Semi-final | 1–1 | (United Arab Emirates) Al-Ahli | Riyadh, Saudi Arabia |
| 2015 | Semi-final | 2–3 | (United Arab Emirates) Al-Ahli | Dubai, UAE |
| 2016 | Group stage | 2–2 | (Uzbekistan) Pakhtakor | Tashkent, Uzbekistan |
| 2016 | Group stage | 4–1 | (Uzbekistan) Pakhtakor | Riyadh, Saudi Arabia |
| 2016 | Group stage | 1–1 | (United Arab Emirates) Al-Jazira | Abu Dhabi, UAE |
| 2016 | Group stage | 1–0 | (United Arab Emirates) Al-Jazira | Riyadh, Saudi Arabia |
| 2016 | Group stage | 0–2 | (Iran) Tractor Sazi | Doha, Qatar (H) |
| 2016 | Group stage | 2–1 | (Iran) Tractor Sazi | Muscat, Oman (A) |
| 2016 | Round of 16 | 0–0 | (Uzbekistan) Lokomotiv | Riyadh, Saudi Arabia |
| 2016 | Round of 16 | 1–2 | (Uzbekistan) Lokomotiv | Tashkent, Uzbekistan |
| 2017 | Group stage | 1–1 | (Iran) Persepolis | Muscat, Oman (A) |
| 2017 | Group stage | 2–1 | (Qatar) Al-Rayyan | Riyadh, Saudi Arabia |
| 2017 | Group stage | 2–2 | (United Arab Emirates) Al-Wahda | Abu Dhabi, UAE |
| 2017 | Group stage | 1–0 | (United Arab Emirates) Al-Wahda | Riyadh, Saudi Arabia |
| 2017 | Group stage | 0–0 | (Iran) Persepolis | Muscat, Oman (H) |
| 2017 | Group stage | 4–3 | (Qatar) Al-Rayyan | Doha, Qatar |
| 2017 | Round of 16 | 2–1 | (Iran) Esteghlal | Seeb, Oman (A) |
| 2017 | Round of 16 | 2–1 | (Iran) Esteghlal | Al Rayyan, Qatar (H) |
| 2017 | Quarter-final | 0–0 | (United Arab Emirates) Al Ain FC | Al Ain, UAE |
| 2017 | Quarter-final | 3–0 | (United Arab Emirates) Al Ain FC | Riyadh, Saudi Arabia |

=== Al-Ittihad ===
Al-Ittihad results
| Season | Round | Result | Opponent | Venue |
|---|---|---|---|---|
| 2004 | Group stage | 2–0 | (Kuwait) Al-Arabi | Jeddah, Saudi Arabia |
| 2004 | Group stage | 3–1 | (Uzbekistan) Neftchi | Fergana, Uzbekistan |
| 2004 | Group stage | 2–3 | (Iran) Sepahan | Fuladshahr, Iran |
| 2004 | Group stage | 4–0 | (Iran) Sepahan | Jeddah, Saudi Arabia |
| 2004 | Group stage | 0–0 | (Kuwait) Al-Arabi | Kuwait City, Kuwait |
| 2004 | Group stage | 3–0 | (Uzbekistan) Neftchi | Jeddah, Saudi Arabia |
| 2004 | Quarter-final | 1–1 | (China) Dalian Shide | Dalian, China |
| 2004 | Quarter-final | 1–0 | (China) Dalian Shide | Jeddah, Saudi Arabia |
| 2004 | Semi-final | 2–1 | (South Korea) Jeonbuk H.M. | Jeddah, Saudi Arabia |
| 2004 | Semi-final | 2–2 | (South Korea) Jeonbuk H.M. | Jeonju, South Korea |
| 2004 | Final | 1–3 | (South Korea) Seongnam I.C. | Jeddah, Saudi Arabia |
| 2004 | Final | 5–0 | (South Korea) Seongnam I.C. | Seongnam, South Korea |
| 2005 | Quarter-final | 1–1 | (China) Shandong Luneng | Jinan, China |
| 2005 | Quarter-final | 7–2 | (China) Shandong Luneng | Jeddah, Saudi Arabia |
| 2005 | Semi-final | 5–0 | (South Korea) Busan IPark | Busan, South Korea |
| 2005 | Semi-final | 2–0 | (South Korea) Busan IPark | Jeddah, Saudi Arabia |
| 2005 | Final | 1–1 | (United Arab Emirates) Al Ain | Al Ain, UAE |
| 2005 | Final | 4–2 | (United Arab Emirates) Al Ain | Jeddah, Saudi Arabia |
| 2006 | Quarter-final | 2–0 | (Syria) Al-Karamah | Jeddah, Saudi Arabia |
| 2006 | Quarter-final | 0–4 | (Syria) Al-Karamah | Homs, Syria |
| 2008 | Group stage | 1–0 | (Uzbekistan) Bunyodkor | Jeddah, Saudi Arabia |
| 2008 | Group stage | 1–0 | (Syria) Al-Ittihad | Aleppo, Syria |
| 2008 | Group stage | 1–2 | (Iran) Sepahan | Fuladshahr, Iran |
| 2008 | Group stage | 0–1 | (Iran) Sepahan | Jeddah, Saudi Arabia |
| 2008 | Group stage | 0–2 | (Uzbekistan) Bunyodkor | Tashkent, Uzbekistan |
| 2008 | Group stage | 3–0 | (Syria) Al-Ittihad | Jeddah, Saudi Arabia |
| 2009 | Group stage | 2–1 | (Iran) Esteghlal | Jeddah, Saudi Arabia |
| 2009 | Group stage | 3–1 | (Qatar) Umm Salal | Doha, Qatar |
| 2009 | Group stage | 0–0 | (United Arab Emirates) Al Jazira | Dubai, UAE |
| 2009 | Group stage | 1–1 | (United Arab Emirates) Al Jazira | Jeddah, Saudi Arabia |
| 2009 | Group stage | 1–1 | (Iran) Esteghlal | Tehran, Iran |
| 2009 | Group stage | 7–0 | (Qatar) Umm Salal | Jeddah, Saudi Arabia |
| 2009 | Round of 16 | 2–1 | (Saudi Arabia) Al-Shabab | Jeddah, Saudi Arabia |
| 2009 | Quarter-final | 1–1 | (Uzbekistan) Pakhtakor | Tashkent, Uzbekistan |
| 2009 | Quarter-final | 4–0 | (Uzbekistan) Pakhtakor | Jeddah, Saudi Arabia |
| 2009 | Semi-final | 6–2 | (Japan) Nagoya Grampus | Jeddah, Saudi Arabia |
| 2009 | Semi-final | 2–1 | (Japan) Nagoya Grampus | Nagoya, Japan |
| 2009 | Final | 1–2 | (South Korea) Pohang Steelers | Tokyo, Japan |
| 2010 | Group stage | 0–3 | (Uzbekistan) Bunyodkor | Tashkent, Uzbekistan |
| 2010 | Group stage | 2–2 | (Iran) Zob Ahan | Jeddah, Saudi Arabia |
| 2010 | Group stage | 2–0 | (United Arab Emirates) Al-Wahda | Abu Dhabi, UAE |
| 2010 | Group stage | 4–0 | (United Arab Emirates) Al-Wahda | Jeddah, Saudi Arabia |
| 2010 | Group stage | 1–1 | (Uzbekistan) Bunyodkor | Jeddah, Saudi Arabia |
| 2010 | Group stage | 0–1 | (Iran) Zob Ahan | Fuladshahr, Iran |
| 2011 | Group stage | 3–1 | (Iran) Persepolis | Jeddah, Saudi Arabia |
| 2011 | Group stage | 1–0 | (Uzbekistan) Bunyodkor | Tashkent, Uzbekistan |
| 2011 | Group stage | 3–0 | (United Arab Emirates) Al-Wahda | Abu Dhabi, UAE |
| 2011 | Group stage | 0–0 | (United Arab Emirates) Al-Wahda | Jeddah, Saudi Arabia |
| 2011 | Group stage | 2–3 | (Iran) Persepolis | Tehran, Iran |
| 2011 | Group stage | 1–1 | (Uzbekistan) Bunyodkor | Jeddah, Saudi Arabia |
| 2011 | Round of 16 | 3–1 | (Saudi Arabia) Al-Hilal | Jeddah, Saudi Arabia |
| 2011 | Quarter-final | 3–1 | (South Korea) FC Seoul | Jeddah, Saudi Arabia |
| 2011 | Quarter-final | 0–1 | (South Korea) FC Seoul | Seoul, South Korea |
| 2011 | Semi-final | 2–3 | (South Korea) Jeonbuk H.M. | Jeddah, Saudi Arabia |
| 2011 | Semi-final | 1–2 | (South Korea) Jeonbuk H.M. | Jeonju, South Korea |
| 2012 | Group stage | 4–0 | (Uzbekistan) Pakhtakor | Jeddah, Saudi Arabia |
| 2012 | Group stage | 3–1 | (Qatar) Al-Arabi | Doha, Qatar |
| 2012 | Group stage | 1–0 | (United Arab Emirates) Baniyas | Jeddah, Saudi Arabia |
| 2012 | Group stage | 0–0 | (United Arab Emirates) Baniyas | Abu Dhabi, UAE |
| 2012 | Group stage | 2–1 | (Uzbekistan) Pakhtakor | Tashkent, Uzbekistan |
| 2012 | Group stage | 3–2 | (Qatar) Al-Arabi | Jeddah, Saudi Arabia |
| 2012 | Round of 16 | 3–0 | (Iran) Persepolis | Jeddah, Saudi Arabia |
| 2012 | Quarter-final | 4–2 | (China) Guangzhou Evergrande | Jeddah, Saudi Arabia |
| 2012 | Quarter-final | 1–2 | (China) Guangzhou Evergrande | Guangzhou, China |
| 2012 | Semi-final | 1–0 | (Saudi Arabia) Al-Ahli | Jeddah, Saudi Arabia |
| 2012 | Semi-final | 0–2 | (Saudi Arabia) Al-Ahli | Jeddah, Saudi Arabia |
| 2014 | Group stage | 0–1 | (Iran) Tractor Sazi | Tabriz, Iran |
| 2014 | Group stage | 2–1 | (United Arab Emirates) Al-Ain | Makkah, Saudi Arabia |
| 2014 | Group stage | 0–2 | (Qatar) Lekhwiya | Doha, Qatar |
| 2014 | Group stage | 3–1 | (Qatar) Lekhwiya | Makkah, Saudi Arabia |
| 2014 | Group stage | 2–0 | (Iran) Tractor Sazi | Makkah, Saudi Arabia |
| 2014 | Group stage | 1–1 | (United Arab Emirates) Al-Ain | Al Ain, UAE |
| 2014 | Round of 16 | 1–0 | (Saudi Arabia) Al-Shabab | Makkah, Saudi Arabia |
| 2014 | Round of 16 | 3–1 | (Saudi Arabia) Al-Shabab | Riyadh, Saudi Arabia |
| 2014 | Quarter-final | 0–2 | (United Arab Emirates) Al-Ain | Al Ain, UAE |
| 2014 | Quarter-final | 1–3 | (United Arab Emirates) Al-Ain | Makkah, Saudi Arabia |
| 2016 | Qualifying play-off | 2–1 | (Jordan) Al-Wehdat | Jeddah, Saudi Arabia |
| 2016 | Group stage | 1–1 | (Uzbekistan) Lokomotiv | Tashkent, Uzbekistan |
| 2016 | Group stage | 1–1 | (Uzbekistan) Lokomotiv | Jeddah, Saudi Arabia |
| 2016 | Group stage | 1–2 | (United Arab Emirates) Al-Nasr | Jeddah, Saudi Arabia |
| 2016 | Group stage | 0–0 | (United Arab Emirates) Al-Nasr | Dubai, UAE |
| 2016 | Group stage | 4–0 | (Iran) Sepahan | Doha, Qatar (H) |
| 2016 | Group stage | 2–0 | (Iran) Sepahan | Muscat, Oman (A) |

=== Al-Shabab ===
Al-Shabab results
| Season | Round | Result | Opponent | Venue |
|---|---|---|---|---|
| 2005 | Group stage | 1–1 | (Iran) Sepahan | Riyadh, Saudi Arabia |
| 2005 | Group stage | 2–1 | (Syria) Al-Wahda | Damascus, Syria |
| 2005 | Group stage | 0–3 | (United Arab Emirates) Al Ain | Al Ain, UAE |
| 2005 | Group stage | 1–0 | (United Arab Emirates) Al Ain | Riyadh, Saudi Arabia |
| 2005 | Group stage | 0–1 | (Iran) Sepahan | Fuladshahr, Iran |
| 2005 | Group stage | 3–1 | (Syria) Al-Wahda | Riyadh, Saudi Arabia |
| 2006 | Group stage | 0–0 | (Qatar) Al Sadd | Riyadh, Saudi Arabia |
| 2006 | Group stage | 2–0 | (Iraq) Al-Quwa Al-Jawiya | Tripoli, Lebanon |
| 2006 | Group stage | 0–3 | (Kuwait) Al-Arabi | Kuwait City, Kuwait |
| 2006 | Group stage | 2–0 | (Kuwait) Al-Arabi | Riyadh, Saudi Arabia |
| 2006 | Group stage | 3–2 | (Qatar) Al Sadd | Doha, Qatar |
| 2006 | Group stage | 2–1 | (Iraq) Al-Quwa Al-Jawiya | Riyadh, Saudi Arabia |
| 2006 | Quarter-final | 0–6 | (South Korea) Ulsan Hyundai | Ulsan, South Korea |
| 2006 | Quarter-final | 0–1 | (South Korea) Ulsan Hyundai | Riyadh, Saudi Arabia |
| 2007 | Group stage | 2–0 | (United Arab Emirates) Al Ain | Al Ain, UAE |
| 2007 | Group stage | 0–1 | (Iran) Sepahan | Riyadh, Saudi Arabia |
| 2007 | Group stage | 4–0 | (Syria) Al-Ittihad | Riyadh, Saudi Arabia |
| 2007 | Group stage | 1–1 | (Syria) Al-Ittihad | Aleppo, Syria |
| 2007 | Group stage | 2–0 | (United Arab Emirates) Al Ain | Riyadh, Saudi Arabia |
| 2007 | Group stage | 0–1 | (Iran) Sepahan | Fuladshahr, Iran |
| 2009 | Group stage | 3–1 | (Qatar) Al-Gharafa | Doha, Qatar |
| 2009 | Group stage | 0–0 | (Iran) Persepolis | Riyadh, Saudi Arabia |
| 2009 | Group stage | 1–0 | (Qatar) Al-Gharafa | Riyadh, Saudi Arabia |
| 2009 | Group stage | 0–1 | (Iran) Persepolis | Tehran, Iran |
| 2009 | Round of 16 | 1–2 | (Saudi Arabia) Al-Ittihad | Jeddah, Saudi Arabia |
| 2010 | Group stage | 1–1 | (Iran) Sepahan | Riyadh, Saudi Arabia |
| 2010 | Group stage | 3–1 | (Uzbekistan) Pakhtakor | Tashkent, Uzbekistan |
| 2010 | Group stage | 1–2 | (United Arab Emirates) Al-Ain | Al Ain, UAE |
| 2010 | Group stage | 3–2 | (United Arab Emirates) Al-Ain | Riyadh, Saudi Arabia |
| 2010 | Group stage | 0–1 | (Iran) Sepahan | Fuladshahr, Iran |
| 2010 | Group stage | 2–1 | (Uzbekistan) Pakhtakor | Riyadh, Saudi Arabia |
| 2010 | Round of 16 | 3–2 | (Iran) Esteghlal | Riyadh, Saudi Arabia |
| 2010 | Quarter-final | 2–0 | (South Korea) Jeonbuk H.M. | Jeonju, South Korea |
| 2010 | Quarter-final | 0–1 | (South Korea) Jeonbuk H.M. | Riyadh, Saudi Arabia |
| 2010 | Semi-final | 4–3 | (South Korea) Seongnam I.C. | Riyadh, Saudi Arabia |
| 2010 | Semi-final | 0–1 | (South Korea) Seongnam I.C. | Seongnam, South Korea |
| 2011 | Group stage | 1–1 | (Qatar) Al-Rayyan | Al-Rayyan, Qatar |
| 2011 | Group stage | 0–0 | (Iran) Zob Ahan | Riyadh, Saudi Arabia |
| 2011 | Group stage | 4–1 | (United Arab Emirates) Emirates | Riyadh, Saudi Arabia |
| 2011 | Group stage | 1–2 | (United Arab Emirates) Emirates | Ras al-Khaimah, UAE |
| 2011 | Group stage | 1–0 | (Qatar) Al-Rayyan | Riyadh, Saudi Arabia |
| 2011 | Group stage | 1–0 | (Iran) Zob Ahan | Fuladshahr, Iran |
| 2011 | Round of 16 | 0–1 | (Qatar) Al-Sadd | Doha, Qatar |
| 2013 | Group stage | 2–0 | (Qatar) El-Jaish | Riyadh, Saudi Arabia |
| 2013 | Group stage | 1–1 | (United Arab Emirates) Al-Jazira | Abu Dhabi, UAE |
| 2013 | Group stage | 1–0 | (Iran) Tractor Sazi | Riyadh, Saudi Arabia |
| 2013 | Group stage | 1–0 | (Iran) Tractor Sazi | Tabriz, Iran |
| 2013 | Group stage | 0–3 | (Qatar) El-Jaish | Al Rayyan, Qatar |
| 2013 | Group stage | 2–1 | (United Arab Emirates) Al-Jazira | Riyadh, Saudi Arabia |
| 2013 | Round of 16 | 2–1 | (Qatar) Al-Gharafa | Doha, Qatar |
| 2013 | Round of 16 | 3–0 | (Qatar) Al-Gharafa | Riyadh, Saudi Arabia |
| 2013 | Quarter-final | 1–1 | (Japan) Kashiwa Reysol | Kashiwa, Japan |
| 2013 | Quarter-final | 2–2 | (Japan) Kashiwa Reysol | Riyadh, Saudi Arabia |
| 2014 | Group stage | 1–0 | (Iran) Esteghlal | Tehran, Iran |
| 2014 | Group stage | 1–3 | (United Arab Emirates) Al-Jazira | Riyadh, Saudi Arabia |
| 2014 | Group stage | 4–3 | (Qatar) Al-Rayyan | Riyadh, Saudi Arabia |
| 2014 | Group stage | 2–0 | (Qatar) Al-Rayyan | Al Rayyan, Qatar |
| 2014 | Group stage | 2–1 | (Iran) Esteghlal | Riyadh, Saudi Arabia |
| 2014 | Group stage | 2–1 | (United Arab Emirates) Al-Jazira | Abu Dhabi, UAE |
| 2014 | Round of 16 | 0–1 | (Saudi Arabia) Al-Ittihad | Makkah, Saudi Arabia |
| 2014 | Round of 16 | 1–3 | (Saudi Arabia) Al-Ittihad | Riyadh, Saudi Arabia |
| 2015 | Group stage | 0–0 | (United Arab Emirates) Al-Ain | Al Ain, UAE |
| 2015 | Group stage | 2–2 | (Uzbekistan) Pakhtakor | Riyadh, Saudi Arabia |
| 2015 | Group stage | 1–2 | (Iran) Naft Tehran | Tehran, Iran |
| 2015 | Group stage | 0–3 | (Iran) Naft Tehran | Riyadh, Saudi Arabia |
| 2015 | Group stage | 0–1 | (United Arab Emirates) Al-Ain | Riyadh, Saudi Arabia |
| 2015 | Group stage | 2–0 | (Uzbekistan) Pakhtakor | Tashkent, Uzbekistan |

=== Al-Ahli ===
Al-Ahli results
| Season | Round | Result | Opponent | Venue |
|---|---|---|---|---|
| 2003 | Qualifying play-off | 2–3 | (United Arab Emirates) Al-Ahli | Dubai, UAE |
| 2003 | Qualifying play-off | 2–2 | (United Arab Emirates) Al-Ahli | Jeddah, Saudi Arabia |
| 2005 | Group stage | 2–1 | (Iraq) Al-Zawra'a | Beirut, Lebanon |
| 2005 | Group stage | 3–1 | (Syria) Al-Jaish | Jeddah, Saudi Arabia |
| 2005 | Group stage | 3–0 | (Uzbekistan) Pakhtakor | Jeddah, Saudi Arabia |
| 2005 | Group stage | 1–2 | (Uzbekistan) Pakhtakor | Tashkent, Uzbekistan |
| 2005 | Group stage | 5–1 | (Iraq) Al-Zawra'a | Jeddah, Saudi Arabia |
| 2005 | Group stage | 4–0 | (Syria) Al-Jaish | Damascus, Syria |
| 2005 | Quarter-final | 2–1 | (China) Shenzhen | Jeddah, Saudi Arabia |
| 2005 | Quarter-final | 1–3 | (China) Shenzhen | Shenzhen, China |
| 2008 | Group stage | 1–2 | (Qatar) Al Sadd | Doha, Qatar |
| 2008 | Group stage | 1–1 | (Syria) Al-Karamah | Jeddah, Saudi Arabia |
| 2008 | Group stage | 0–0 | (United Arab Emirates) Al-Wahda | Jeddah, Saudi Arabia |
| 2008 | Group stage | 1–2 | (United Arab Emirates) Al-Wahda | Abu Dhabi, UAE |
| 2008 | Group stage | 2–2 | (Qatar) Al Sadd | Jeddah, Saudi Arabia |
| 2008 | Group stage | 0–0 | (Syria) Al-Karamah | Homs, Syria |
| 2010 | Group stage | 1–2 | (Iran) Esteghlal | Jeddah, Saudi Arabia |
| 2010 | Group stage | 2–3 | (Qatar) Al-Gharafa | Doha, Qatar |
| 2010 | Group stage | 5–1 | (United Arab Emirates) Al Jazira | Jeddah, Saudi Arabia |
| 2010 | Group stage | 2–0 | (United Arab Emirates) Al Jazira | Abu Dhabi, UAE |
| 2010 | Group stage | 1–2 | (Iran) Esteghlal | Tehran, Iran |
| 2010 | Group stage | 0–1 | (Qatar) Al-Gharafa | Jeddah, Saudi Arabia |
| 2012 | Group stage | 0–1 | (Qatar) Lekhwiya | Doha, Qatar |
| 2012 | Group stage | 1–1 | (Iran) Sepahan | Jeddah, Saudi Arabia |
| 2012 | Group stage | 2–1 | (United Arab Emirates) Al-Nasr | Dubai, UAE |
| 2012 | Group stage | 3–1 | (United Arab Emirates) Al-Nasr | Jeddah, Saudi Arabia |
| 2012 | Group stage | 3–0 | (Qatar) Lekhwiya | Jeddah, Saudi Arabia |
| 2012 | Group stage | 1–2 | (Iran) Sepahan | Isfahan, Iran |
| 2012 | Round of 16 | 3–3(4-2p) | (United Arab Emirates) Al Jazira | Abu Dhabi, UAE |
| 2012 | Quarter-final | 0–0 | (Iran) Sepahan | Isfahan, Iran |
| 2012 | Quarter-final | 4–1 | (Iran) Sepahan | Jeddah, Saudi Arabia |
| 2012 | Semi-final | 0–1 | (Saudi Arabia) Al-Ittihad | Jeddah, Saudi Arabia |
| 2012 | Semi-final | 2–0 | (Saudi Arabia) Al-Ittihad | Jeddah, Saudi Arabia |
| 2012 | Final | 0–3 | (South Korea) Ulsan Hyundai | Ulsan, South Korea |
| 2013 | Group stage | 2–0 | (Qatar) Al-Gharafa | Makkah, Saudi Arabia |
| 2013 | Group stage | 2–1 | (United Arab Emirates) Al-Nasr | Dubai, UAE |
| 2013 | Group stage | 4–2 | (Iran) Sepahan | Fuladshahr, Iran |
| 2013 | Group stage | 4–1 | (Iran) Sepahan | Makkah, Saudi Arabia |
| 2013 | Group stage | 2–2 | (Qatar) Al-Gharafa | Doha, Qatar |
| 2013 | Group stage | 2–2 | (United Arab Emirates) Al-Nasr | Makkah, Saudi Arabia |
| 2013 | Round of 16 | 1–1 | (Qatar) El Jaish | Doha, Qatar |
| 2013 | Round of 16 | 2–0 | (Qatar) El Jaish | Makkah, Saudi Arabia |
| 2013 | Quarter-final | 1–1 | (South Korea) FC Seoul | Makkah, Saudi Arabia |
| 2013 | Quarter-final | 0–1 | (South Korea) FC Seoul | Seoul, South Korea |
| 2015 | Qualifying play-off | 2–1 | (Kuwait) Al-Qadsia | Jeddah, Saudi Arabia |
| 2015 | Group stage | 3–3 | (United Arab Emirates) Al-Ahli | Dubai, UAE |
| 2015 | Group stage | 2–1 | (Uzbekistan) FC Nasaf | Jeddah, Saudi Arabia |
| 2015 | Group stage | 2–0 | (Iran) Tractor Sazi | Jeddah, Saudi Arabia |
| 2015 | Group stage | 2–2 | (Iran) Tractor Sazi | Tabriz, Iran |
| 2015 | Group stage | 2–1 | (United Arab Emirates) Al-Ahli | Jeddah, Saudi Arabia |
| 2015 | Group stage | 0–0 | (Uzbekistan) FC Nasaf | Qarshi, Uzbekistan |
| 2015 | Round of 16 | 0–1 | (Iran) Naft Tehran | Tehran, Iran |
| 2015 | Round of 16 | 2–1 | (Iran) Naft Tehran | Jeddah, Saudi Arabia |
| 2016 | Group stage | 2–1 | (Uzbekistan) FC Nasaf | Jeddah, Saudi Arabia |
| 2016 | Group stage | 1–2 | (Uzbekistan) FC Nasaf | Qarshi, Uzbekistan |
| 2016 | Group stage | 0–1 | (United Arab Emirates) Al-Ain | Al Ain, UAE |
| 2016 | Group stage | 1–2 | (United Arab Emirates) Al-Ain | Jeddah, Saudi Arabia |
| 2016 | Group stage | 4–1 | (Qatar) El Jaish | Doha, Qatar |
| 2016 | Group stage | 2–0 | (Qatar) El Jaish | Jeddah, Saudi Arabia |

=== Al-Ettifaq ===
Al-Ettifaq results
| Season | Round | Result | Opponent | Venue |
|---|---|---|---|---|
| 2009 | Group stage | 1–2 | (Uzbekistan) Bunyodkor | Tashkent, Uzbekistan |
| 2009 | Group stage | 2–1 | (Iran) Sepahan | Dammam, Saudi Arabia |
| 2009 | Group stage | 4–1 | (United Arab Emirates) Al Shabab | Dammam, Saudi Arabia |
| 2009 | Group stage | 4–1 | (United Arab Emirates) Al Shabab | Dubai, UAE |
| 2009 | Group stage | 4–0 | (Uzbekistan) Bunyodkor | Dammam, Saudi Arabia |
| 2009 | Group stage | 0–3 | (Iran) Sepahan | Isfahan, Iran |
| 2009 | Round of 16 | 1–2 | (Uzbekistan) Pakhtakor | Dammam, Saudi Arabia |
| 2012 | Qualifying play-off | 1–3 | (Iran) Esteghlal | Tehran, Iran |
| 2013 | Group stage | 0–1 | (Uzbekistan) Pakhtakor | Tashkent, Uzbekistan |
| 2013 | Group stage | 0–0 | (Qatar) Lekhwiya | Dammam, Saudi Arabia |
| 2013 | Group stage | 0–1 | (United Arab Emirates) Al Shabab | Dubai, UAE |
| 2013 | Group stage | 4–1 | (United Arab Emirates) Al Shabab | Dammam, Saudi Arabia |
| 2013 | Group stage | 2–0 | (Uzbekistan) Pakhtakor | Dammam, Saudi Arabia |
| 2013 | Group stage | 0–2 | (Qatar) Lekhwiya | Doha, Qatar |

=== Al-Nassr ===
Al-Nassr results
| Season | Round | Result | Opponent | Venue |
|---|---|---|---|---|
| 2011 | Group stage | 2–2 | (Uzbekistan) Pakhtakor | Tashkent, Uzbekistan |
| 2011 | Group stage | 2–1 | (Iran) Esteghlal | Riyadh, Saudi Arabia |
| 2011 | Group stage | 0–1 | (Qatar) Al Sadd | Doha, Qatar |
| 2011 | Group stage | 1–1 | (Qatar) Al Sadd | Riyadh, Saudi Arabia |
| 2011 | Group stage | 4–0 | (Uzbekistan) Pakhtakor | Riyadh, Saudi Arabia |
| 2011 | Group stage | 1–2 | (Iran) Esteghlal | Tehran, Iran |
| 2011 | Round of 16 | 1–4 | (Iran) Zob Ahan | Isfahan, Iran |
| 2015 | Group stage | 1–1 | (Uzbekistan) Bunyodkor | Riyadh, Saudi Arabia |
| 2015 | Group stage | 1–1 | (Qatar) Lekhwiya | Doha, Qatar |
| 2015 | Group stage | 3–0 | (Iran) Persepolis | Riyadh, Saudi Arabia |
| 2015 | Group stage | 0–1 | (Iran) Persepolis | Tehran, Iran |
| 2015 | Group stage | 1–0 | (Uzbekistan) Bunyodkor | Tashkent, Uzbekistan |
| 2015 | Group stage | 1–3 | (Qatar) Lekhwiya | Riyadh, Saudi Arabia |
| 2016 | Group Stage | 3–3 | (Uzbekistan) Bunyodkor | Riyadh, Saudi Arabia |
| 2016 | Group Stage | 1–0 | (Uzbekistan) Bunyodkor | Tashkent, Uzbekistan |
| 2016 | Group Stage | 1–1 | (Qatar) Lekhwiya | Riyadh, Saudi Arabia |
| 2016 | Group Stage | 0–4 | (Qatar) Lekhwiya | Doha, Qatar |
| 2016 | Group Stage | 0–3 | (Iran) Zob Ahan | Muscat, Oman (A) |
| 2016 | Group Stage | 0–3 | (Iran) Zob Ahan | Dubai, UAE (H) |

=== Al-Fateh ===
Al-Fateh results
| Season | Round | Result | Opponent | Venue |
|---|---|---|---|---|
| 2014 | Group stage | 0–0 | (Uzbekistan) Bunyodkor | Al-Hasa, Saudi Arabia |
| 2014 | Group stage | 0–1 | (Iran) Foolad | Ahwaz, Iran |
| 2014 | Group stage | 0–0 | (Qatar) El Jaish | Al-Hasa, Saudi Arabia |
| 2014 | Group stage | 0–2 | (Qatar) El Jaish | Doha, Qatar |
| 2014 | Group stage | 2–3 | (Uzbekistan) Bunyodkor | Tashkent, Uzbekistan |
| 2014 | Group stage | 1–5 | (Iran) Foolad | Al-Hasa, Saudi Arabia |

== Statistics against each other ==
Against Saudi clubs
| Team | Pld | W | D | L | GF | GA | GD | Pts |
|---|---|---|---|---|---|---|---|---|
| (Saudi Arabia) Al-Ittihad | 6 | 5 | 0 | 1 | 10 | 5 | +5 | 15 |
| (Saudi Arabia) Al-Ahli | 2 | 1 | 0 | 1 | 2 | 1 | +1 | 3 |
| (Saudi Arabia) Al-Hilal | 1 | 0 | 0 | 1 | 1 | 3 | −2 | 0 |
| (Saudi Arabia) Al-Shabab | 3 | 0 | 0 | 3 | 2 | 6 | −4 | 0 |

- In the following table, the results of 4 meetings between Saudi teams have been played:

| Season | Round | Home team | Result | Away team | Venue |
|---|---|---|---|---|---|
| 2009 | Round of 16 | Al-Ittihad | 2–1 | Al-Shabab | Jeddah, Saudi Arabia |
| 2011 | Round of 16 | Al-Ittihad | 3–1 | Al-Hilal | Jeddah, Saudi Arabia |
| 2012 | Semi-Final | Al-Ittihad | 1–0 | Al-Ahli | Jeddah, Saudi Arabia |
| 2012 | Semi-Final | Al-Ahli | 2–0 | Al-Ittihad | Jeddah, Saudi Arabia |
| 2014 | Round of 16 | Al-Ittihad | 1–0 | Al-Shabab | Jeddah, Saudi Arabia |
| 2014 | Round of 16 | Al-Shabab | 1–3 | Al-Ittihad | Riyadh, Saudi Arabia |

== Statistics by opponents league ==
The following statistics does not include qualifying round matches.

As of 24 May 2016

=== A-League ===
Against Australian clubs
| Team | Pld | W | D | L | GF | GA | GD | Pts |
|---|---|---|---|---|---|---|---|---|
| (Saudi Arabia) Al-Hilal | 2 | 0 | 1 | 1 | 0 | 1 | −1 | 1 |
| Total | 2 | 0 | 1 | 1 | 0 | 1 | −1 | 1 |

=== Chinese Super League ===
Against Chinese clubs
| Team | Pld | W | D | L | GF | GA | GD | Pts |
|---|---|---|---|---|---|---|---|---|
| (Saudi Arabia) Al-Ittihad | 6 | 3 | 2 | 1 | 15 | 8 | +7 | 11 |
| (Saudi Arabia) Al-Ahli | 2 | 1 | 0 | 1 | 3 | 4 | −1 | 3 |
| Total | 8 | 4 | 2 | 2 | 18 | 12 | +6 | 14 |

=== Iran Pro League ===
Against Iranian clubs
| Team | Pld | W | D | L | GF | GA | GD | Pts |
|---|---|---|---|---|---|---|---|---|
| (Saudi Arabia) Al-Hilal | 21 | 9 | 4 | 8 | 25 | 22 | +3 | 31 |
| (Saudi Arabia) Al-Ittihad | 15 | 7 | 2 | 6 | 28 | 16 | +12 | 23 |
| (Saudi Arabia) Al-Shabab | 17 | 6 | 4 | 7 | 12 | 15 | −3 | 22 |
| (Saudi Arabia) Al-Ahli | 12 | 5 | 3 | 4 | 22 | 15 | +7 | 18 |
| (Saudi Arabia) Al-Nassr | 7 | 2 | 0 | 5 | 7 | 14 | −7 | 6 |
| (Saudi Arabia) Al-Ettifaq | 2 | 1 | 0 | 1 | 2 | 4 | −2 | 3 |
| (Saudi Arabia) Al-Fateh | 2 | 0 | 0 | 2 | 1 | 6 | −5 | 0 |
| Total | 76 | 30 | 13 | 33 | 97 | 92 | +5 | 103 |

=== Iraqi Premier League ===
Against Iraqi clubs
| Team | Pld | W | D | L | GF | GA | GD | Pts |
|---|---|---|---|---|---|---|---|---|
| (Saudi Arabia) Al-Hilal | 4 | 3 | 1 | 0 | 8 | 3 | +5 | 10 |
| (Saudi Arabia) Al-Ahli | 2 | 2 | 0 | 1 | 7 | 2 | +5 | 6 |
| (Saudi Arabia) Al-Shabab | 2 | 2 | 0 | 0 | 4 | 1 | +3 | 6 |
| Total | 8 | 7 | 1 | 1 | 19 | 6 | +13 | 22 |

=== J1 League ===
Against Japanese clubs
| Team | Pld | W | D | L | GF | GA | GD | Pts |
|---|---|---|---|---|---|---|---|---|
| (Saudi Arabia) Al-Ittihad | 2 | 2 | 0 | 0 | 8 | 3 | +5 | 6 |
| (Saudi Arabia) Al-Shabab | 2 | 0 | 2 | 0 | 3 | 3 | 0 | 2 |
| Total | 4 | 2 | 2 | 0 | 11 | 6 | +5 | 8 |

=== K League Classic ===
Against South Korean clubs
| Team | Pld | W | D | L | GF | GA | GD | Pts |
|---|---|---|---|---|---|---|---|---|
| (Saudi Arabia) Al-Ittihad | 11 | 5 | 1 | 5 | 24 | 15 | +9 | 16 |
| (Saudi Arabia) Al-Shabab | 6 | 2 | 0 | 4 | 6 | 12 | −6 | 6 |
| (Saudi Arabia) Al-Ahli | 3 | 0 | 1 | 2 | 1 | 5 | −4 | 1 |
| (Saudi Arabia) Al-Hilal | 2 | 0 | 0 | 2 | 0 | 5 | −5 | 0 |
| Total | 22 | 7 | 2 | 13 | 31 | 37 | −6 | 23 |

=== Kuwaiti Premier League ===
Against Kuwaiti clubs
| Team | Pld | W | D | L | GF | GA | GD | Pts |
|---|---|---|---|---|---|---|---|---|
| (Saudi Arabia) Al-Ittihad | 2 | 1 | 1 | 0 | 2 | 0 | +2 | 4 |
| (Saudi Arabia) Al-Shabab | 2 | 1 | 0 | 1 | 2 | 3 | −1 | 3 |
| (Saudi Arabia) Al-Hilal | 2 | 0 | 2 | 0 | 1 | 1 | 0 | 2 |
| Total | 6 | 2 | 3 | 1 | 5 | 4 | +1 | 9 |

=== Qatar Stars League ===
Against Qatari clubs
| Team | Pld | W | D | L | GF | GA | GD | Pts |
|---|---|---|---|---|---|---|---|---|
| (Saudi Arabia) Al-Hilal | 22 | 11 | 7 | 4 | 40 | 22 | +18 | 40 |
| (Saudi Arabia) Al-Shabab | 13 | 9 | 2 | 2 | 22 | 12 | +10 | 29 |
| (Saudi Arabia) Al-Ahli | 12 | 5 | 3 | 4 | 21 | 13 | +8 | 18 |
| (Saudi Arabia) Al-Ittihad | 6 | 5 | 0 | 1 | 19 | 7 | +12 | 15 |
| (Saudi Arabia) Al-Nassr | 6 | 0 | 3 | 3 | 4 | 11 | −7 | 3 |
| (Saudi Arabia) Al-Ettifaq | 2 | 0 | 1 | 1 | 0 | 2 | −2 | 1 |
| (Saudi Arabia) Al-Fateh | 2 | 0 | 1 | 1 | 0 | 2 | −2 | 1 |
| Total | 63 | 30 | 17 | 16 | 106 | 69 | +37 | 107 |

=== Syrian Premier League ===
Against Syrian clubs
| Team | Pld | W | D | L | GF | GA | GD | Pts |
|---|---|---|---|---|---|---|---|---|
| (Saudi Arabia) Al-Shabab | 4 | 3 | 1 | 0 | 10 | 3 | +7 | 10 |
| (Saudi Arabia) Al-Ittihad | 4 | 3 | 0 | 1 | 6 | 4 | +2 | 9 |
| (Saudi Arabia) Al-Ahli | 4 | 2 | 2 | 0 | 8 | 2 | +6 | 8 |
| Total | 12 | 8 | 3 | 1 | 24 | 9 | +15 | 27 |

=== UAE Arabian Gulf League ===
Against Emirati clubs
| Team | Pld | W | D | L | GF | GA | GD | Pts |
|---|---|---|---|---|---|---|---|---|
| (Saudi Arabia) Al-Hilal | 26 | 11 | 9 | 6 | 44 | 33 | +11 | 42 |
| (Saudi Arabia) Al-Ittihad | 16 | 6 | 7 | 3 | 22 | 13 | +8 | 25 |
| (Saudi Arabia) Al-Ahli | 15 | 6 | 5 | 4 | 30 | 23 | +7 | 23 |
| (Saudi Arabia) Al-Shabab | 14 | 7 | 2 | 5 | 20 | 17 | +3 | 23 |
| (Saudi Arabia) Al-Ettifaq | 4 | 3 | 0 | 1 | 12 | 4 | +8 | 9 |
| Total | 75 | 33 | 23 | 19 | 127 | 90 | +37 | 122 |

=== Uzbek League ===
Against Uzbek clubs
| Team | Pld | W | D | L | GF | GA | GD | Pts |
|---|---|---|---|---|---|---|---|---|
| (Saudi Arabia) Al-Hilal | 15 | 10 | 3 | 2 | 32 | 10 | +22 | 33 |
| (Saudi Arabia) Al-Ittihad | 14 | 7 | 5 | 2 | 23 | 12 | +11 | 26 |
| (Saudi Arabia) Al-Nassr | 6 | 3 | 3 | 0 | 12 | 6 | +6 | 12 |
| (Saudi Arabia) Al-Shabab | 4 | 3 | 1 | 0 | 9 | 4 | +5 | 10 |
| (Saudi Arabia) Al-Ahli | 6 | 3 | 1 | 2 | 9 | 6 | +3 | 10 |
| (Saudi Arabia) Al-Ettifaq | 5 | 2 | 0 | 3 | 8 | 5 | +3 | 6 |
| (Saudi Arabia) Al-Fateh | 2 | 0 | 1 | 1 | 2 | 3 | −1 | 1 |
| Total | 52 | 28 | 14 | 10 | 95 | 46 | +49 | 98 |

== Finals ==
Performance by clubs
| Club | Winners | Runners-up | Years won | Years runners-up |
|---|---|---|---|---|
| Al Hilal | 4 | 4 | 1991, 1999–2000, 2019, 2021 | 1986, 1987, 2014, 2017 |
| Al-Ittihad | 2 | 1 | 2004, 2005 | 2009 |
| Al Ahli | 0 | 2 | | 1985–86, 2012 |
| Al Shabab | 0 | 1 | | 1992–93 |
| Al Nassr | 0 | 1 | | 1995 |
