= 2011 AFC Champions League =

30th edition of premier club football tournament organized by the AFC

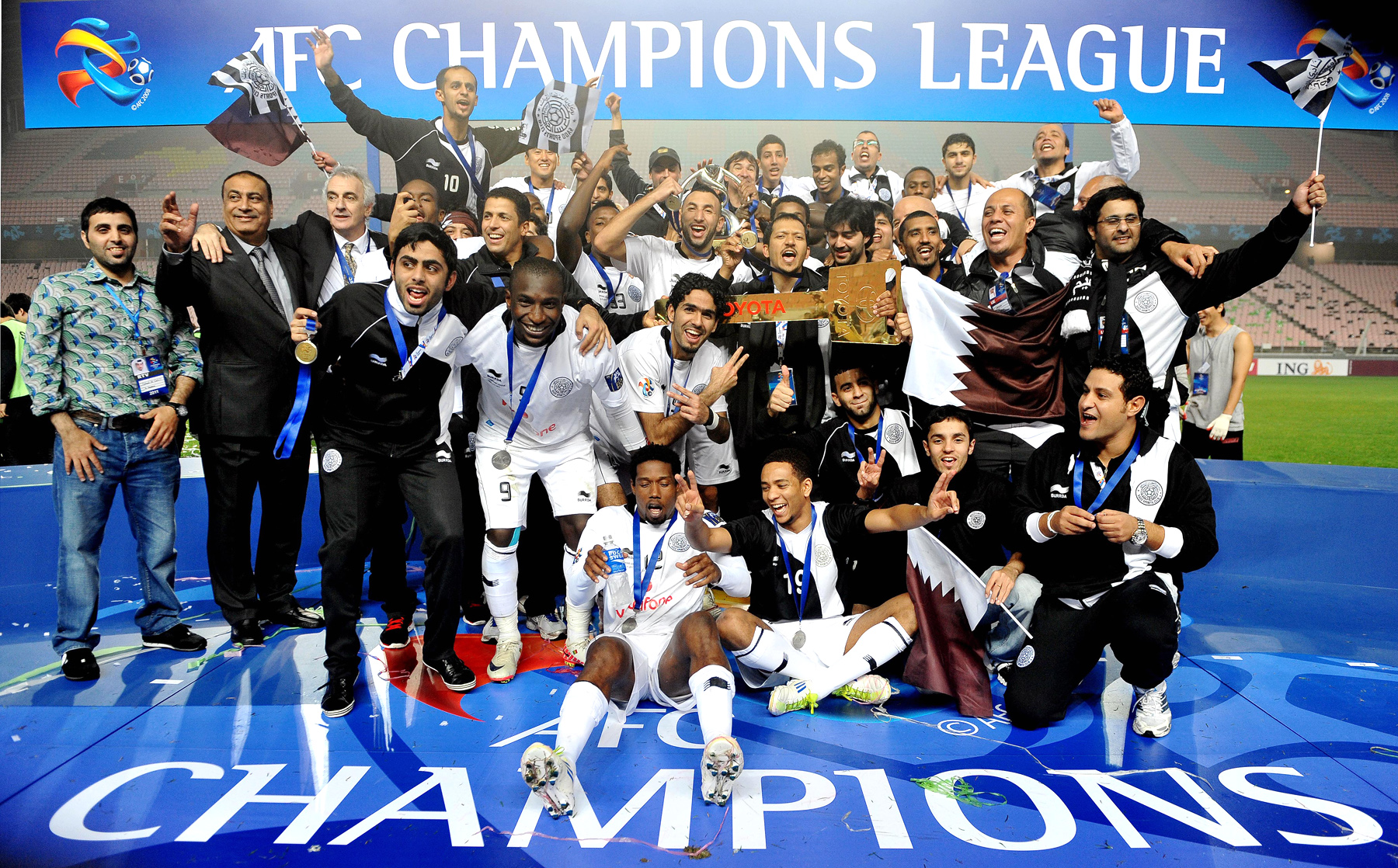
- Al-Sadd players celebrate after winning the final

Tournament details
- Dates: 12 February – 5 November 2011
- Teams: 36 (from 13 associations)

Final positions
- Champions: (Qatar) Al-Sadd (2nd title)
- Runners-up: (South Korea) Jeonbuk Hyundai Motors

Tournament statistics
- Matches played: 117
- Goals scored: 323 (2.76 per match)
- Attendance: 1,264,547 (10,808 per match)
- Top scorer(s): Lee Dong-gook (9 goals)
- Best player: Lee Dong-gook

The 2011 AFC Champions League was the 30th edition of the top-level Asian club football tournament organized by the Asian Football Confederation (AFC), and the 9th under the current AFC Champions League title. The winners, Al-Sadd qualified for the 2011 FIFA Club World Cup in Japan.

== Allocation of entries per association ==
The AFC approved criteria for participation in the 2011 and 2012 seasons. The final decision date was set after the Executive Committee meeting in November 2010.

On 30 November 2009, the AFC announced 12 more MA's that were keen to join the ACL, in addition to ten participating national associations. Singapore later withdrew. The full list of candidate associations were as follows:

East Asia

- Already participating: Australia, China PR, Indonesia, Japan, (South Korea) Korea Republic
- Keen to participate: Malaysia, Myanmar, Thailand
- Withdrew: Singapore
- Disqualified: Vietnam

West Asia

- Already participating: Iran, Qatar, Saudi Arabia, (United Arab Emirates) UAE, Uzbekistan
- Keen to participate: Iraq, Jordan, Oman, Pakistan, Palestine, Tajikistan, Yemen, India

Note: Singapore, Thailand, Vietnam and India have clubs taking part in play-offs to qualify for the group stages of ACL in 2010.

=== Entrants per association ===
The allocation for entry to the 2011 ACL stayed the same as the previous two seasons with the exception of Vietnam who were disqualified and their previous playoff slot was awarded to Qatar.

West Asia
Member Association	Clubs	Spots		
Member Association	Clubs	Group stage	Play-off	AFC Cup
Saudi Arabia	14	4	0	0
Iran	18	4	0	0
(United Arab Emirates) UAE	12	3	1	0
Qatar	12	2	1	0
Uzbekistan	14	2	0	2
India	14	0	1	1
Iraq	36	0	0	3
Jordan	12	0	0	2
Oman	12	0	0	2
Yemen	14	0	0	2
Pakistan	16	0	0	0
Palestine	22	0	0	0
Tajikistan	10	0	0	0

Meet the criteria
Do not meet the criteria

East Asia
Member Association	Clubs	Spots		
Member Association	Clubs	Group stage	Play-off	AFC Cup
Japan	18	4	0	0
(South Korea) Korea Republic	15^{*}	4	0	0
China PR	16	4	0	0
Australia	9+1^{**}	2	0	0
Indonesia	18	1	1	1
Thailand	18	0	1	1
Vietnam	14	0	0	2
Singapore	12	0	0	1
Malaysia	14	0	0	0
Myanmar	12	0	0	0

^{*} One of the K-League clubs, Sangju Sangmu Phoenix, is unable to qualify for the ACL because the team is not a commercial entity and their players are not professionally contracted.

^{**} One of the A-League clubs, Wellington Phoenix, is based in New Zealand, an OFC member country. They are unable to qualify for the ACL.

The finalists of the 2010 AFC Cup also participated in the play-off, provided that they meet the Champions League criteria.

== Teams ==
The following is the list of direct entrants for the group stage confirmed by the AFC.

Group stage direct entrants: West Asia (Groups A–D)
Team	Qualifying method	App*	Last App
(Iran) Sepahan	2009–10 Persian Gulf Cup champions	7th	2010
(Iran) Persepolis	2009–10 Hazfi Cup winners	3rd	2009
(Iran) Zob Ahan	2009–10 Persian Gulf Cup runners-up	3rd	2010
(Iran) Esteghlal	2009–10 Persian Gulf Cup 3rd place	4th	2010
(Saudi Arabia) Al-Hilal	2009–10 Saudi Professional League champions	7th	2010
(Saudi Arabia) Al-Ittihad Jeddah	2009–10 Saudi Professional League runners-up 2010 King Cup of Champions winners	7th	2010
(Saudi Arabia) Al-Nassr	2009–10 Saudi Professional League 3rd place	1st	none
(Saudi Arabia) Al-Shabab	2009–10 Saudi Professional League 4th place	6th	2010
(United Arab Emirates) Al-Wahda	2009–10 UAE Premier League champions	6th	2010
(United Arab Emirates) Emirates	2009–10 UAE President's Cup winners	1st	none
(United Arab Emirates) Al-Jazira	2009–10 UAE Premier League runners-up	3rd	2010
(Qatar) Al-Gharafa	2009–10 Qatar Stars League champions	6th	2010
(Qatar) Al-Rayyan	2010 Emir of Qatar Cup winners	3rd	2007
(Uzbekistan) Bunyodkor	2010 Uzbek League champions 2010 Uzbekistan Cup winners	4th	2010
(Uzbekistan) Pakhtakor	2010 Uzbek League runners-up	9th	2010

Group stage direct entrants: East Asia (Groups E–H)
Team	Qualifying method	App*	Last App
(Japan) Nagoya Grampus	2010 J. League Division 1 champions	2nd	2009
(Japan) Kashima Antlers	2010 Emperor's Cup winners	5th	2010
(Japan) Gamba Osaka	2010 J. League Division 1 runners-up	5th	2010
(Japan) Cerezo Osaka	2010 J. League Division 1 3rd place	1st	none
(China) Shandong Luneng Taishan	2010 Chinese Super League champions	5th	2010
(China) Tianjin Teda	2010 Chinese Super League runners-up	2nd	2009
(China) Shanghai Shenhua	2010 Chinese Super League 3rd place	6th	2009
(China) Hangzhou Greentown	2010 Chinese Super League 4th place	1st	none
(South Korea) FC Seoul	2010 K-League champions	2nd	2009
(South Korea) Suwon Samsung Bluewings	2010 Korean FA Cup winners	4th	2010
(South Korea) Jeju United	2010 K-League runners-up	1st	none
(South Korea) Jeonbuk Hyundai Motors	2010 K-League 3rd place	5th	2010
(Australia) Sydney FC	2009–10 A-League premiers 2010 A-League Grand Final winners	2nd	2007
(Australia) Melbourne Victory	2009–10 A-League regular season runners-up	3rd	2010
(Indonesia) Arema	2009–10 Indonesia Super League champions	2nd	2007

* Number of appearances (including qualifying rounds) since the 2002/03 season, when the competition was rebranded as the AFC Champions League

The following is the list of participants for the playoff stage confirmed by the AFC. The committee further proposed that one team be shifted by the means of a draw from the West to the East for sake of balance.

Qualifying play-off participants: West Asia
Team	Qualifying method	App*	Last App
(India) Dempo	2009–10 I-League champions	2nd	2009
(United Arab Emirates) Al-Ain	2009–10 UAE Premier League 3rd place	7th	2010
(Syria) Al-Ittihad	2010 AFC Cup winners	5th	2008
(Qatar) Al-Sadd	2009–10 Qatar Stars League runners-up	8th	2010

Qualifying play-off participants: East Asia
Team	Qualifying method	App*	Last App
(Indonesia) Sriwijaya	2010 Piala Indonesia winners	3rd	2010
(Thailand) Muangthong United	2010 Thai Premier League champions	2nd	2010

== Schedule ==
Schedule of dates for 2011 competition.

Phase	Round	Draw date	First leg	Second leg
Qualifying play-offs	Semi-finals	7 December 2010	12–13 February 2011	
Qualifying play-offs	Finals	7 December 2010	19 February 2011	
Group stage	Matchday 1	7 December 2010	1–2 March 2011	
Group stage	Matchday 2	7 December 2010	15–16 March 2011	
Group stage	Matchday 3	7 December 2010	5–6 April 2011	
Group stage	Matchday 4	7 December 2010	19–20 April 2011	
Group stage	Matchday 5	7 December 2010	3–4 May 2011	
Group stage	Matchday 6	7 December 2010	10–11 May 2011	
Knockout phase	Round of 16	7 December 2010	24–25 May 2011	
Knockout phase	Quarter-finals	7 June 2011	14 September 2011	27–28 September 2011
Knockout phase	Semi-finals	7 June 2011	19 October 2011	26 October 2011
Knockout phase	Final	7 June 2011	4 or 5 November 2011	

== Qualifying play-off ==
The draw for the qualifying play-off was held in Kuala Lumpur, Malaysia on 7 December 2010. In order to create balance another draw was held, moving one of the teams (Al-Ain) from the West into the East side of the play-offs.

The two winners from the qualifying play-off (one from West Asia and one from East Asia) advanced to the group stage. All losers from the qualifying play-off entered the 2011 AFC Cup group stage.

=== West Asia ===
Team 1	Score	Team 2
Semi-final
Al-Sadd (Qatar)	5–1	(Syria) Al-Ittihad
Final
Al-Sadd (Qatar)	2–0	(India) Dempo

=== East Asia ===
Team 1	Score	Team 2
Semi-final
Sriwijaya (Indonesia)	2–2 (aet)(7–6p)	(Thailand) Muangthong United
Final
Sriwijaya (Indonesia)	0–4	(United Arab Emirates) Al-Ain

== Group stage ==
The draw for the group stage was held in Kuala Lumpur, Malaysia on 7 December 2010. Clubs from the same country may not be drawn into the same group. The winners and runners-up of each group advanced to the knockout stage.

=== Group A ===
Pos	Team	Pld	W	D	L	GF	GA	GD	Pts	Qualification	SEP	HIL	GHA	JAZ
1	(Iran) Sepahan	6	4	1	1	14	5	+9	13 (Note: Tiebreakers: Sepahan and Al-Hilal are ranked by their head-to-head records: Sepahan (4 pts), Al-Hilal (1 pt).)	Advance to knockout stage	—	1–1	2–0	5–1
2	(Saudi Arabia) Al-Hilal	6	4	1	1	11	6	+5	13	Advance to knockout stage	1–2	—	2–0	3–1
3	(Qatar) Al-Gharafa	6	2	1	3	6	7	−1	7		1–0	0–1	—	5–2
4	(United Arab Emirates) Al-Jazira	6	0	1	5	7	20	−13	1		1–4	2–3	0–0	—

=== Group B ===
Pos	Team	Pld	W	D	L	GF	GA	GD	Pts	Qualification	SAD	NAS	EST	PAK
1	(Qatar) Al-Sadd	6	2	4	0	8	6	+2	10	Advance to knockout stage	—	1–0	2–2	2–1
2	(Saudi Arabia) Al-Nassr	6	2	2	2	10	7	+3	8 (Note: Tiebreakers: Al-Nassr and Esteghlal are also tied on their head-to-head records (3 pts, 0 GD, 3 GF), and so are ranked by their overall goal difference.)	Advance to knockout stage	1–1	—	2–1	4–0
3	(Iran) Esteghlal	6	2	2	2	11	10	+1	8		1–1	2–1	—	4–2
4	(Uzbekistan) Pakhtakor	6	1	2	3	8	14	−6	5		1–1	2–2	2–1	—

=== Group C ===
Pos	Team	Pld	W	D	L	GF	GA	GD	Pts	Qualification	ITT	BUN	WAH	PER
1	(Saudi Arabia) Al-Ittihad Jeddah	6	3	2	1	10	5	+5	11	Advance to knockout stage	—	1–1	0–0	3–1
2	(Uzbekistan) Bunyodkor	6	2	3	1	8	6	+2	9	Advance to knockout stage	0–1	—	3–2	0–0
3	(United Arab Emirates) Al-Wahda	6	1	3	2	6	8	−2	6		0–3	1–1	—	2–0
4	(Iran) Persepolis	6	1	2	3	6	11	−5	5		3–2	1–3	1–1	—

=== Group D ===
Pos	Team	Pld	W	D	L	GF	GA	GD	Pts	Qualification	ZOB	SHA	EMI	RAY
1	(Iran) Zob Ahan	6	4	1	1	7	3	+4	13	Advance to knockout stage	—	0–1	2–1	1–0
2	(Saudi Arabia) Al-Shabab	6	3	2	1	8	4	+4	11	Advance to knockout stage	0–0	—	4–1	1–0
3	(United Arab Emirates) Emirates	6	2	0	4	6	10	−4	6		0–1	2–1	—	2–0
4	(Qatar) Al-Rayyan	6	1	1	4	4	8	−4	4		1–3	1–1	2–0	—

=== Group E ===
Pos	Team	Pld	W	D	L	GF	GA	GD	Pts	Qualification	GAM	TIA	JEJ	MEL
1	(Japan) Gamba Osaka	6	3	1	2	13	7	+6	10 (Note: Tiebreakers: Gamba Osaka and Tianjin Teda are ranked by their head-to-head records: Gamba Osaka (3 pts, +1 GD), Tianjin Teda (3 pts, –1 GD).)	Advance to knockout stage	—	2–0	3–1	5–1
2	(China) Tianjin Teda	6	3	1	2	8	6	+2	10	Advance to knockout stage	2–1	—	3–0	1–1
3	(South Korea) Jeju United	6	2	1	3	6	10	−4	7		2–1	0–1	—	1–1
4	(Australia) Melbourne Victory	6	1	3	2	7	11	−4	6		1–1	2–1	1–2	—

=== Group F ===
Pos	Team	Pld	W	D	L	GF	GA	GD	Pts	Qualification	SEO	NAG	AIN	HAN
1	(South Korea) FC Seoul	6	3	2	1	9	4	+5	11	Advance to knockout stage	—	0–2	3–0	3–0
2	(Japan) Nagoya Grampus	6	3	1	2	9	6	+3	10	Advance to knockout stage	1–1	—	4–0	1–0
3	(United Arab Emirates) Al-Ain	6	2	1	3	4	9	−5	7		0–1	3–1	—	1–0
4	(China) Hangzhou Greentown	6	1	2	3	3	6	−3	5		1–1	2–0	0–0	—

Source: Stats.The-AFC.com

=== Group G ===
Pos	Team	Pld	W	D	L	GF	GA	GD	Pts	Qualification	JEO	CER	SHL	ARE
1	(South Korea) Jeonbuk Hyundai Motors	6	5	0	1	14	2	+12	15	Advance to knockout stage	—	1–0	1–0	6–0
2	(Japan) Cerezo Osaka	6	4	0	2	11	4	+7	12	Advance to knockout stage	1–0	—	4–0	2–1
3	(China) Shandong Luneng	6	2	1	3	9	8	+1	7		1–2	2–0	—	5–0
4	(Indonesia) Arema	6	0	1	5	2	22	−20	1		0–4	0–4	1–1	—

=== Group H ===
Pos	Team	Pld	W	D	L	GF	GA	GD	Pts	Qualification	SUW	KSH	SYD	SHS
1	(South Korea) Suwon Samsung Bluewings	6	3	3	0	12	3	+9	12 (Note: Tiebreakers: Suwon Samsung Bluewings and Kashima Antlers are also tied on their head-to-head records (2 pts, 0 GD, 2 GF), and so are ranked by their overall goal difference.)	Advance to knockout stage	—	1–1	3–1	4–0
2	(Japan) Kashima Antlers	6	3	3	0	9	3	+6	12	Advance to knockout stage	1–1	—	2–1	2–0
3	(Australia) Sydney FC	6	1	2	3	6	11	−5	5		0–0	0–3	—	1–1
4	(China) Shanghai Shenhua	6	0	2	4	3	13	−10	2		0–3	0–0	2–3	—

== Knockout stage ==
=== Bracket ===
Round of 16
(Saudi Arabia) Al-Ittihad	3
(Saudi Arabia) Al-Hilal	1
(South Korea) FC Seoul	3
(Japan) Kashima Antlers	0
(Japan) Gamba Osaka	0
(Japan) Cerezo Osaka	1
(South Korea) Jeonbuk Hyundai Motors	3
(China) Tianjin Teda	0
(South Korea) Suwon Samsung Bluewings	2
(Japan) Nagoya Grampus	0
(Iran) Zob Ahan	4
(Saudi Arabia) Al-Nassr	1
(Iran) Sepahan	3
(Uzbekistan) Bunyodkor	1
(Qatar) Al-Sadd	1
(Saudi Arabia) Al-Shabab	0

Quarter-finals
(Saudi Arabia) Al-Ittihad	3	0	3
(South Korea) FC Seoul	1	1	2
(Japan) Cerezo Osaka	4	1	5
(South Korea) Jeonbuk Hyundai Motors	3	6	9
(South Korea) Suwon Samsung Bluewings (a.e.t.)	1	2	3
(Iran) Zob Ahan	1	1	2
(Iran) Sepahan	0	2	2
(Qatar) Al-Sadd	3	1	4

Semi-finals
(Saudi Arabia) Al-Ittihad	2	1	3
(South Korea) Jeonbuk Hyundai Motors	3	2	5
(South Korea) Suwon Samsung Bluewings	0	1	1
(Qatar) Al-Sadd	2	0	2

Final
(South Korea) Jeonbuk Hyundai Motors	2 (2)
(Qatar) Al-Sadd (p)	2 (4)

=== Round of 16 ===
Based on the results from the group stage, the matchups of the round of 16 were decided as below. Each tie was played as one match, hosted by the winners of each group (Team 1) against the runners-up of another group (Team 2).

West Asia
Team 1	Score	Team 2
Sepahan (Iran)	3–1	(Uzbekistan) Bunyodkor
Al-Ittihad (Saudi Arabia)	3–1	(Saudi Arabia) Al-Hilal
Al-Sadd (Qatar)	1–0	(Saudi Arabia) Al-Shabab
Zob Ahan (Iran)	4–1	(Saudi Arabia) Al-Nassr

East Asia
Team 1	Score	Team 2
Gamba Osaka (Japan)	0–1	(Japan) Cerezo Osaka
Jeonbuk Hyundai Motors (South Korea)	3–0	(China) Tianjin Teda
FC Seoul (South Korea)	3–0	(Japan) Kashima Antlers
Suwon Samsung Bluewings (South Korea)	2–0	(Japan) Nagoya Grampus

=== Quarter-finals ===
The draw for the quarter-finals, semi-finals, and final was held in Kuala Lumpur, Malaysia on 7 June 2011. In this draw, the "country protection" rule was applied: if there are exactly two clubs from the same country, they may not face each other in the quarter-finals; however, if there are more than two clubs from the same country, they may face each other in the quarter-finals.

Team 1	Agg.	Team 2	1st leg	2nd leg
Cerezo Osaka (Japan)	5–9	(South Korea) Jeonbuk Hyundai Motors	4–3	1–6
Al-Ittihad (Saudi Arabia)	3–2	(South Korea) FC Seoul	3–1	0–1
Sepahan (Iran)	2–4	(Qatar) Al-Sadd	0–3	2–1
Suwon Samsung Bluewings (South Korea)	3–2	(Iran) Zob Ahan	1–1	2–1 (aet)

Notes

1. The AFC Disciplinary Committee decided to award the quarter-final first leg to Al-Sadd against Sepahan as a 3–0 forfeit win after Sepahan were found guilty of fielding an ineligible player. The match originally ended 1–0 to Sepahan.

=== Semi-finals ===
Team 1	Agg.	Team 2	1st leg	2nd leg
Suwon Samsung Bluewings (South Korea)	1–2	(Qatar) Al-Sadd	0–2	1–0
Al-Ittihad (Saudi Arabia)	3–5	(South Korea) Jeonbuk Hyundai Motors	2–3	1–2

=== Final ===
The final of the 2011 AFC Champions League was hosted by one of the finalists, decided by draw. This format was a change from the 2009 and 2010 editions, where the final was played at a neutral venue.

5 November 2011
19:00 UTC+09:00

Jeonbuk Hyundai Motors (South Korea)	2 – 2 (a.e.t.)	(Qatar) Al-Sadd
Eninho 17'; Lee Seung-Hyun 90+2'	Report	Sim Woo-Yeon 30' (o.g.); Keïta 61'
Penalties
Eninho (penalty scored); Kim Dong-Chan (penalty missed); Park Won-Jae (penalty missed); Kim Sang-Sik (penalty scored)	2 – 4	(penalty scored) Niang; (penalty scored) Al-Haydos; (penalty missed) Lee Jung-Soo; (penalty scored) Majid; (penalty scored) Belhadj

Jeonju World Cup Stadium, Jeonju
Attendance: 41,805
Referee: Ravshan Irmatov (Uzbekistan)

== Awards ==
The following awards were given for the 2011 AFC Champions League:

- Most Valuable Player Award: (South Korea) Lee Dong-Gook (Jeonbuk Hyundai Motors)
- Top Scorer: (South Korea) Lee Dong-Gook (Jeonbuk Hyundai Motors)
- Fair Play Award: (South Korea) Jeonbuk Hyundai Motors

== Top scorers ==
Note: Goals scored in qualifying round not counted.

Rank	Player	Club	MD1	MD2	MD3	MD4	MD5	MD6	R16	QF1	QF2	SF1	SF2	F	Total
1	(South Korea) Lee Dong-Gook	(South Korea) Jeonbuk Hyundai Motors				1	2			2	4				9
2	(Brazil) Eninho	(South Korea) Jeonbuk Hyundai Motors							2		1	1	2	1	7
3	(South Korea) Ha Tae-Gyun	(South Korea) Suwon Samsung Bluewings		3			1	2							6
4	(Kuwait) Bader Al-Mutawa	(Saudi Arabia) Al-Nassr	1				2	1	1						5
4	(Iran) Farhad Majidi	(Iran) Esteghlal	1		1		2	1							5
4	(Montenegro) Dejan Damjanović	(South Korea) FC Seoul	1	1			2		1						5
4	(Senegal) Ibrahima Touré	(Iran) Sepahan	1	1				2	1						5
8	(Saudi Arabia) Yasser Al-Qahtani	(Saudi Arabia) Al-Hilal			1	2		1							4
8	(Algeria) Abdelmalek Ziaya	(Saudi Arabia) Al-Ittihad	2		1				1						4
8	(Japan) Hiroshi Kiyotake	(Japan) Cerezo Osaka					1	1		2					4
8	(Japan) Takashi Inui	(Japan) Cerezo Osaka			1		2	1							4
8	(Brazil) Rodrigo Pimpão	(Japan) Cerezo Osaka	2				1	1							4
8	(South Korea) Yeom Ki-Hun	(South Korea) Suwon Samsung Bluewings			1	1	1		1						4
8	(Brazil) Igor Castro	(Iran) Zob Ahan	1		1				2						4
8	(Iran) Mohammad Ghazi	(Iran) Zob Ahan					1		1	1	1				4

== See also ==
- 2011 AFC Cup
- 2011 AFC President's Cup
