= 2011 AFC Champions League qualifying play-off =

Football tournament qualification stage

Six teams, four from West Asia and two from East Asia, competed in the 2011 AFC Champions League qualifying play-off.

The draw for the qualifying play-off was held in Kuala Lumpur, Malaysia on 7 December 2010. In order to create balance another draw was held, moving one of the teams (Al-Ain) from the West into the East side of the play-offs.

Both the semi-finals and finals were played in one match, hosted by one of the teams. Extra time and penalty shootout are used to decide the winner if necessary. The semi-finals were played 12 February 2011, and the finals were played 19 February 2011.

The two winners from the qualifying play-off, one from West Asia and one from East Asia, advanced to the group stage to join the 30 automatic qualifiers. All losers from the qualifying play-off entered the 2011 AFC Cup group stage.

== Matches ==
=== West Asia ===
Team 1	Score	Team 2
Semi-final
Al-Sadd (Qatar)	5–1	(Syria) Al-Ittihad
Final
Al-Sadd (Qatar)	2–0	(India) Dempo

==== Semi-final ====
12 February 2011
17:45 UTC+03:00

Al-Sadd (Qatar)	5 – 1	(Syria) Al-Ittihad
Keïta 12', 30'; Leandro 33', 67'; Siddiq 76'	Report	Hemidi 82' (pen.)

Jassim bin Hamad Stadium, Al Rayyan
Attendance: 2,000
Referee: Alireza Faghani (Iran)

==== Final ====
19 February 2011
17:50 UTC+03:00

Al-Sadd (Qatar)	2 – 0	(India) Dempo
Keïta 33'; Leandro 89'	Report

Jassim bin Hamad Stadium, Al Rayyan
Attendance: 3,841
Referee: Valentin Kovalenko (Uzbekistan)

=== East Asia ===
Team 1	Score	Team 2
Semi-final
Sriwijaya (Indonesia)	2–2 (aet)(7–6p)	(Thailand) Muangthong United
Final
Sriwijaya (Indonesia)	0–4	(United Arab Emirates) Al-Ain

==== Semi-final ====
12 February 2011
15:30 UTC+07:00

Sriwijaya (Indonesia)	2 – 2 (a.e.t.)	(Thailand) Muangthong United
Gumbs 49'; Gathuessi 112'	Report	Datsakorn 82'; Teerasil 93'
Penalties
Gumbs (penalty scored); Astaman (penalty scored); Sudarsono (penalty scored); Lasut (penalty scored); Diano (penalty missed); Gathuessi (penalty missed); Panggabean (penalty scored); Nasir (penalty scored); Jufriyanto (penalty scored)	7 – 6	(penalty scored) Datsakorn; (penalty scored) Jakkraphan P. (penalty scored) Anon S. (penalty scored) Naruphol; (penalty missed) Dagno; (penalty missed) Kouakou; (penalty scored) Teerasil; (penalty scored) Nattaporn; (penalty missed) Weerawut

Jakabaring Stadium, Palembang
Attendance: 12,000
Referee: Malik Abdul Bashir (Singapore)

==== Final ====
19 February 2011
15:30 UTC+07:00

Sriwijaya (Indonesia)	0 – 4	(United Arab Emirates) Al-Ain
	Report	Haddaf 13'; Elias 45+4' (pen.), 53'; Abdulrahman 50' (pen.)

Jakabaring Stadium, Palembang
Attendance: 12,000
Referee: Masaaki Toma (Japan)
