= 2011 AFC Champions League knockout stage =

Football tournament knockout stage

A total of 16 teams, 8 from West Asia and 8 from East Asia, competed in the 2011 AFC Champions League knockout stage. They included the 8 group winners and the 8 group runners-up from the group stage.

Each round of this single-elimination tournament was played over one or two matches. In the round of 16, each tie was played in one match, hosted by the winners of each group against the runners-up of another group. In the quarter-finals and semi-finals, each tie was played over two legs on a home-and-away basis. The final was hosted by one of the finalists, decided by draw. The away goals rule (for two-legged ties), extra time (away goals do not apply in extra time) and penalty shootout would be used to decide the winner if necessary.

The matchups for the round of 16 were decided prior to the group stage draw. After the completion of the round of 16, the draw for the quarter-finals, semi-finals, and final was held in Kuala Lumpur, Malaysia on 7 June 2011. In this draw, the "country protection" rule was applied: if there are exactly two clubs from the same country, they may not face each other in the quarter-finals; however, if there are more than two clubs from the same country, they may face each other in the quarter-finals.

== Qualified teams ==
Group	Winners	Runners-up
A	(Iran) Sepahan	(Saudi Arabia) Al-Hilal
B	(Qatar) Al-Sadd	(Saudi Arabia) Al-Nassr
C	(Saudi Arabia) Al-Ittihad	(Uzbekistan) Bunyodkor
D	(Iran) Zob Ahan	(Saudi Arabia) Al-Shabab
E	(Japan) Gamba Osaka	(China) Tianjin Teda
F	(South Korea) FC Seoul	(Japan) Nagoya Grampus
G	(South Korea) Jeonbuk Hyundai Motors	(Japan) Cerezo Osaka
H	(South Korea) Suwon Samsung Bluewings	(Japan) Kashima Antlers

== Bracket ==
While the bracket below shows the entire knockout stage, the draw for the round of 16 matches was determined at the time of the group draw, and kept teams from East and West Asia completely separate for that round.

The draw for the quarter-finals and beyond was held separately, after the conclusion of the round of 16.

Round of 16
(Saudi Arabia) Al-Ittihad	3
(Saudi Arabia) Al-Hilal	1
(South Korea) FC Seoul	3
(Japan) Kashima Antlers	0
(Japan) Gamba Osaka	0
(Japan) Cerezo Osaka	1
(South Korea) Jeonbuk Hyundai Motors	3
(China) Tianjin Teda	0
(South Korea) Suwon Samsung Bluewings	2
(Japan) Nagoya Grampus	0
(Iran) Zob Ahan	4
(Saudi Arabia) Al-Nassr	1
(Iran) Sepahan	3
(Uzbekistan) Bunyodkor	1
(Qatar) Al-Sadd	1
(Saudi Arabia) Al-Shabab	0

Quarter-finals
(Saudi Arabia) Al-Ittihad	3	0	3
(South Korea) FC Seoul	1	1	2
(Japan) Cerezo Osaka	4	1	5
(South Korea) Jeonbuk Hyundai Motors	3	6	9
(South Korea) Suwon Samsung Bluewings (a.e.t.)	1	2	3
(Iran) Zob Ahan	1	1	2
(Iran) Sepahan	0	2	2
(Qatar) Al-Sadd	3	1	4

Semi-finals
(Saudi Arabia) Al-Ittihad	2	1	3
(South Korea) Jeonbuk Hyundai Motors	3	2	5
(South Korea) Suwon Samsung Bluewings	0	1	1
(Qatar) Al-Sadd	2	0	2

Final
(South Korea) Jeonbuk Hyundai Motors	2 (2)
(Qatar) Al-Sadd (p)	2 (4)

== Round of 16 ==
The matches were played 24–25 May 2011.

West Asia
Team 1	Score	Team 2
Sepahan (Iran)	3–1	(Uzbekistan) Bunyodkor
Al-Ittihad (Saudi Arabia)	3–1	(Saudi Arabia) Al-Hilal
Al-Sadd (Qatar)	1–0	(Saudi Arabia) Al-Shabab
Zob Ahan (Iran)	4–1	(Saudi Arabia) Al-Nassr

East Asia
Team 1	Score	Team 2
Gamba Osaka (Japan)	0–1	(Japan) Cerezo Osaka
Jeonbuk Hyundai Motors (South Korea)	3–0	(China) Tianjin Teda
FC Seoul (South Korea)	3–0	(Japan) Kashima Antlers
Suwon Samsung Bluewings (South Korea)	2–0	(Japan) Nagoya Grampus

=== Matches ===
24 May 2011
19:00 UTC+09:00

Jeonbuk Hyundai Motors (South Korea)	3 – 0	(China) Tianjin Teda
Eninho 32', 84'; Lee Seung-Hyun 43'	Report

Jeonju World Cup Stadium, Jeonju
Attendance: 5,254
Referee: Ali Al Badwawi (UAE)

24 May 2011
19:00 UTC+09:00

Gamba Osaka (Japan)	0 – 1	(Japan) Cerezo Osaka
	Report	Takahashi 88'

Osaka Expo '70 Stadium, Suita
Attendance: 16,463
Referee: Alireza Faghani (Iran)

24 May 2011
19:30 UTC+04:30

Sepahan (Iran)	3 – 1	(Uzbekistan) Bunyodkor
Januário 28'; Touré 33'; Aghili 69' (pen.)	Report	Slavoljub Đorđević 57'

Foolad Shahr Stadium, Isfahan
Attendance: 6,318
Referee: Masaaki Toma (Japan)

24 May 2011
21:05 UTC+03:00

Al-Ittihad (Saudi Arabia)	3 – 1	(Saudi Arabia) Al-Hilal
Nuno Assis 15', 59'; Ziaya 17'	Report	Al-Dosari 82'

Prince Abdullah al-Faisal Stadium, Jeddah
Attendance: 17,150
Referee: Kim Dong-Jin (Korea Republic)

25 May 2011
19:30 UTC+09:00

Suwon Samsung Bluewings (South Korea)	2 – 0	(Japan) Nagoya Grampus
Yeom Ki-Hun 23'; Lee Sang-ho 57'	Report

Suwon World Cup Stadium, Suwon
Attendance: 11,036
Referee: Abdulrahman Abdou (Qatar)

25 May 2011
19:30 UTC+09:00

FC Seoul (South Korea)	3 – 0	(Japan) Kashima Antlers
Bang Seung-Hwan 38'; Damjanović 55'; Ko Myong-Jin 90+2'	Report

Seoul World Cup Stadium, Seoul
Attendance: 12,725
Referee: Nawaf Shukralla (Bahrain)

25 May 2011
19:15 UTC+04:30

Zob Ahan (Iran)	4 – 1	(Saudi Arabia) Al-Nassr
Ghazi 1'; Castro 5', 63'; Kheiri 74'	Report	Al-Mutwa 66'

Foolad Shahr Stadium, Isfahan
Attendance: 5,711
Referee: Choi Myung-Yong (Korea Republic)

25 May 2011
19:00 UTC+03:00

Al-Sadd (Qatar)	1 – 0	(Saudi Arabia) Al-Shabab
Koni 12'	Report

Jassim bin Hamad Stadium, Al Rayyan
Attendance: 7,140
Referee: Yuichi Nishimura (Japan)

== Quarter-finals ==
The first legs were played 14 September 2011, and the second legs were played 27–28 September 2011.

Team 1	Agg.	Team 2	1st leg	2nd leg
Cerezo Osaka (Japan)	5–9	(South Korea) Jeonbuk Hyundai Motors	4–3	1–6
Al-Ittihad (Saudi Arabia)	3–2	(South Korea) FC Seoul	3–1	0–1
Sepahan (Iran)	2–4	(Qatar) Al-Sadd	0–3	2–1
Suwon Samsung Bluewings (South Korea)	3–2	(Iran) Zob Ahan	1–1	2–1 (aet)

Notes

1. The AFC Disciplinary Committee decided to award the quarter-final first leg to Al-Sadd against Sepahan as a 3–0 forfeit win after Sepahan were found guilty of fielding an ineligible player. The match originally ended 1–0 to Sepahan.

=== First legs ===
14 September 2011
19:30 UTC+09:00

Cerezo Osaka (Japan)	4 – 3	(South Korea) Jeonbuk Hyundai Motors
Bando 29'; Kiyotake 56', 81'; Kim Bo-Kyung 64' (pen.)	Report	Lee Dong-Gook 6', 45+1'; Cho Sung-Hwan 58'

Nagai Stadium, Osaka
Attendance: 15,450
Referee: Tan Hai (China PR)

14 September 2011
19:30 UTC+09:00

Suwon Samsung Bluewings (South Korea)	1 – 1	(Iran) Zob Ahan
Park Hyun-Beom 66'	Report	Ghazi 57'

Suwon World Cup Stadium, Suwon
Attendance: 7,659
Referee: Masaaki Toma (Japan)

14 September 2011
19:30 UTC+04:30

Sepahan (Iran)	0 – 3 Awarded	(Qatar) Al-Sadd
Ebrahimi 12'	Report

Foolad Shahr Stadium, Isfahan
Attendance: 5,621
Referee: Ben Williams (Australia)

14 September 2011
20:35 UTC+03:00

Al-Ittihad (Saudi Arabia)	3 – 1	(South Korea) FC Seoul
Noor 45'; Al-Muwallad 76'; Wendel 90+2'	Report	Choi Tae-Uk 83'

Prince Abdullah al-Faisal Stadium, Jeddah
Attendance: 16,790
Referee: Alireza Faghani (Iran)

=== Second legs ===
27 September 2011
19:00 UTC+09:00

Jeonbuk Hyundai Motors (South Korea)	6 – 1	(Japan) Cerezo Osaka
Eninho 31'; Lee Dong-Gook 49', 55', 64', 90+1'; Kim Dong-Chan 76'	Report	Komatsu 72'

Jeonju World Cup Stadium, Jeonju
Attendance: 16,423
Referee: Abdulrahman Abdou (Qatar)

Jeonbuk Hyundai Motors won 9–5 on aggregate.

27 September 2011
19:30 UTC+09:00

FC Seoul (South Korea)	1 – 0	(Saudi Arabia) Al-Ittihad
Molina 85'	Report

Seoul World Cup Stadium, Seoul
Attendance: 15,000
Referee: Valentin Kovalenko (Uzbekistan)

Al-Ittihad won 3–2 on aggregate.

28 September 2011
17:20 UTC+03:30

Zob Ahan (Iran)	1 – 2 (a.e.t.)	(South Korea) Suwon Samsung Bluewings
Ghazi 50'	Report	Yang Sang-Min 77'; Neretljak 99' (pen.)

Foolad Shahr Stadium, Isfahan
Attendance: 7,250
Referee: Khalil Al Ghamdi (Saudi Arabia)

Suwon Samsung Bluewings won 3–2 on aggregate.

28 September 2011
18:20 UTC+03:00

Al-Sadd (Qatar)	1 – 2	(Iran) Sepahan
Niang 86'	Report	Emad 7'; Ashjari 27'

Jassim bin Hamad Stadium, Al Rayyan
Attendance: 6,026
Referee: Yuichi Nishimura (Japan)

Al-Sadd won 4–2 on aggregate.

== Semi-finals ==
The first legs were played 19 October 2011, and the second legs were played 26 October 2011.

Team 1	Agg.	Team 2	1st leg	2nd leg
Suwon Samsung Bluewings (South Korea)	1–2	(Qatar) Al-Sadd	0–2	1–0
Al-Ittihad (Saudi Arabia)	3–5	(South Korea) Jeonbuk Hyundai Motors	2–3	1–2

=== First legs ===
19 October 2011
19:30 UTC+09:00

Suwon Samsung Bluewings (South Korea)	0 – 2	(Qatar) Al-Sadd
	Report	Niang 70', 81'

Suwon World Cup Stadium, Suwon
Attendance: 9,864
Referee: Malik Abdul Bashir (Singapore)

19 October 2011
20:05 UTC+03:00

Al-Ittihad (Saudi Arabia)	2 – 3	(South Korea) Jeonbuk Hyundai Motors
Hazazi 6', 18'	Report	Eninho 2'; Son Seung-Joon 57'; Cho Sung-Hwan 77'

Prince Abdullah al-Faisal Stadium, Jeddah
Attendance: 16,942
Referee: Nawaf Shukralla (Bahrain)

=== Second legs ===
26 October 2011
19:00 UTC+09:00

Jeonbuk Hyundai Motors (South Korea)	2 – 1	(Saudi Arabia) Al-Ittihad
Eninho 22', 36'	Report	Wendel 73'

Jeonju World Cup Stadium, Jeonju
Attendance: 17,069
Referee: Andre El Haddad (Lebanon)

Jeonbuk Hyundai Motors won 5–3 on aggregate.

26 October 2011
18:00 UTC+03:00

Al-Sadd (Qatar)	0 – 1	(South Korea) Suwon Samsung Bluewings
	Report	Oh Jang-Eun 7'

Jassim bin Hamad Stadium, Al Rayyan
Attendance: 10,800
Referee: Ali Al Badwawi (UAE)

Al-Sadd won 2–1 on aggregate.

== Final ==
The final was played 5 November 2011 at home of one of the finalists, decided by draw. This format is different from the 2009 and 2010 editions, where the final was played at a neutral venue.

5 November 2011
19:00 UTC+09:00

Jeonbuk Hyundai Motors (South Korea)	2 – 2 (a.e.t.)	(Qatar) Al-Sadd
Eninho 17'; Lee Seung-Hyun 90+2'	Report	Sim Woo-Yeon 30' (o.g.); Keïta 61'
Penalties
Eninho (penalty scored); Kim Dong-Chan (penalty missed); Park Won-Jae (penalty missed); Kim Sang-Sik (penalty scored)	2 – 4	(penalty scored) Niang; (penalty scored) Al-Haydos; (penalty missed) Lee Jung-Soo; (penalty scored) Majid; (penalty scored) Belhadj

Jeonju World Cup Stadium, Jeonju
Attendance: 41,805
Referee: Ravshan Irmatov (Uzbekistan)
