= 2011 AFC Champions League group stage =

Football tournament group stage

A total of 32 teams, 16 from West Asia and 16 from East Asia, competed in the 2011 AFC Champions League group stage. They included 30 direct entries and 2 winners of the qualifying play-off (one from West Asia and one from East Asia).

The draw for the group stage was held in Kuala Lumpur, Malaysia on 7 December 2010. The 32 teams were drawn into eight groups of four. Clubs from the same country may not be drawn into the same group.

In each group, teams played each other home-and-away in a round-robin format. The matchdays were 1–2 March, 15–16 March, 5–6 April, 19–20 April, 3–4 May, and 10–11 May 2011.

The winners and runners-up of each group advanced to the knockout stage.

== Tiebreakers ==
The clubs are ranked according to points and tie breakers are in following order:

1. Greater number of points obtained in the group matches between the teams concerned;
2. Goal difference resulting from the group matches between the teams concerned;
3. Greater number of goals scored in the group matches between the teams concerned; (Away goals do not apply)
4. Goal difference in all the group matches;
5. Greater number of goals scored in all the group matches;
6. Kicks from the penalty mark if only two teams are involved and they are both on the field of play;
7. Fewer score calculated according to the number of yellow and red cards received in the group matches; (1 point for each yellow card, 3 points for each red card as a consequence of two yellow cards, 3 points for each direct red card, 4 points for each yellow card followed by a direct red card)
8. Drawing of lots.

== Groups ==
=== Group A ===
Pos	Team	Pld	W	D	L	GF	GA	GD	Pts	Qualification	SEP	HIL	GHA	JAZ
1	(Iran) Sepahan	6	4	1	1	14	5	+9	13 (Note: Tiebreakers: Sepahan and Al-Hilal are ranked by their head-to-head records: Sepahan (4 pts), Al-Hilal (1 pt).)	Advance to knockout stage	—	1–1	2–0	5–1
2	(Saudi Arabia) Al-Hilal	6	4	1	1	11	6	+5	13	Advance to knockout stage	1–2	—	2–0	3–1
3	(Qatar) Al-Gharafa	6	2	1	3	6	7	−1	7		1–0	0–1	—	5–2
4	(United Arab Emirates) Al-Jazira	6	0	1	5	7	20	−13	1		1–4	2–3	0–0	—

Notes:
1 March 2011
19:25 UTC+04:00

Al-Jazira (United Arab Emirates)	0 – 0	(Qatar) Al-Gharafa
	Report

Mohammed bin Zayed Stadium, Abu Dhabi
Attendance: 9,625
Referee: Nawaf Shukralla (Bahrain)
1 March 2011
20:30 UTC+03:00

Al-Hilal (Saudi Arabia)	1 – 2	(Iran) Sepahan
Wilhelmsson 90+3'	Report	Touré 51'; Januário 60'

King Fahd International Stadium, Riyadh
Attendance: 15,000
Referee: Ravshan Irmatov (Uzbekistan)

15 March 2011
18:30 UTC+03:00

Al-Gharafa (Qatar)	0 – 1	(Saudi Arabia) Al-Hilal
	Report	Wilhelmsson 9'

Al-Gharafa Stadium, Al Rayyan
Attendance: 8,310
Referee: Kim Dong-Jin (Korea Republic)
15 March 2011
19:00 UTC+03:30

Sepahan (Iran)	5 – 1	(United Arab Emirates) Al-Jazira
Jamshidian 2', 24'; Touré 56'; Janjuš 65'; Kazemian 90'	Report	Baré 54'

Foolad Shahr Stadium, Isfahan
Attendance: 2,520
Referee: Malik Abdul Bashir (Singapore)

5 April 2011
20:00 UTC+04:30

Sepahan (Iran)	2 – 0	(Qatar) Al-Gharafa
Aghili 54' (pen.); Jamshidian 66'	Report

Foolad Shahr Stadium, Isfahan
Attendance: 5,668
Referee: Yuichi Nishimura (Japan)
5 April 2011
20:45 UTC+03:00

Al-Hilal (Saudi Arabia)	3 – 1	(United Arab Emirates) Al-Jazira
Kamel 4'; Al-Qahtani 14'; Al-Shalhoub 90+4'	Report	Jumaa 19'

King Fahd International Stadium, Riyadh
Attendance: 13,421
Referee: Ben Williams (Australia)

20 April 2011
18:50 UTC+03:00

Al-Gharafa (Qatar)	1 – 0	(Iran) Sepahan
Diané 19'	Report

Al-Gharafa Stadium, Al Rayyan
Attendance: 3,426
Referee: Muhsen Basma (Syria)
20 April 2011
19:50 UTC+04:00

Al-Jazira (United Arab Emirates)	2 – 3	(Saudi Arabia) Al-Hilal
Mabkhout 44'; Qasem 45'	Report	Al-Qahtani 56', 65'; Rădoi 77' (pen.)

Mohammed bin Zayed Stadium, Abu Dhabi
Attendance: 6,154
Referee: Masaaki Toma (Japan)

4 May 2011
20:00 UTC+04:30

Sepahan (Iran)	1 – 1	(Saudi Arabia) Al-Hilal
Navidkia 55'	Report	Al-Zori 46'

Foolad Shahr Stadium, Isfahan
Attendance: 8,833
Referee: Tan Hai (China PR)
4 May 2011
19:00 UTC+03:00

Al-Gharafa (Qatar)	5 – 2	(United Arab Emirates) Al-Jazira
Mahmoud 10', 62', 80'; Diané 48'; Al Zain 60'	Report	Jumaa 31'; Ricardo Oliveira 37' (pen.)

Al-Gharafa Stadium, Al Rayyan
Attendance: 5,786
Referee: Valentin Kovalenko (Uzbekistan)

11 May 2011
20:00 UTC+04:00

Al-Jazira (United Arab Emirates)	1 – 4	(Iran) Sepahan
Baré 14'	Report	Kazemian 32'; Touré 60', 71'; Enayati 90+1'

Mohammed bin Zayed Stadium, Abu Dhabi
Attendance: 2,265
Referee: Choi Myung-Yong (Korea Republic)
11 May 2011
21:05 UTC+03:00

Al-Hilal (Saudi Arabia)	2 – 0	(Qatar) Al-Gharafa
Al-Qahtani 47'; Al-Fraidi 82'	Report

King Fahd International Stadium, Riyadh
Attendance: 19,123
Referee: Minoru Tōjō (Japan)

=== Group B ===
Pos	Team	Pld	W	D	L	GF	GA	GD	Pts	Qualification	SAD	NAS	EST	PAK
1	(Qatar) Al-Sadd	6	2	4	0	8	6	+2	10	Advance to knockout stage	—	1–0	2–2	2–1
2	(Saudi Arabia) Al-Nassr	6	2	2	2	10	7	+3	8 (Note: Tiebreakers: Al-Nassr and Esteghlal are also tied on their head-to-head records (3 pts, 0 GD, 3 GF), and so are ranked by their overall goal difference.)	Advance to knockout stage	1–1	—	2–1	4–0
3	(Iran) Esteghlal	6	2	2	2	11	10	+1	8		1–1	2–1	—	4–2
4	(Uzbekistan) Pakhtakor	6	1	2	3	8	14	−6	5		1–1	2–2	2–1	—

Notes:
1 March 2011
17:00 UTC+05:00

Pakhtakor (Uzbekistan)	2 – 2	(Saudi Arabia) Al-Nassr
Karimov 45'; Sharofetdinov 61'	Report	Al-Mutwa 51'; Miladinović 88' (o.g.)

Pakhtakor Markaziy Stadium, Tashkent
Attendance: 15,000
Referee: Minoru Tōjō (Japan)
1 March 2011
17:30 UTC+03:30

Esteghlal (Iran)	1 – 1	(Qatar) Al-Sadd
Majidi 27'	Report	Keita 88'

Azadi Stadium, Tehran
Attendance: 15,000
Referee: Kim Dong-Jin (Korea Republic)

15 March 2011
20:30 UTC+03:00

Al-Nassr (Saudi Arabia)	2 – 1	(Iran) Esteghlal
Sulaimani 60'; Al-Harthi 81'	Report	Omranzadeh 21'

King Fahd International Stadium, Riyadh
Attendance: 12,878
Referee: Abdullah Al Hilali (Oman)
16 March 2011
18:05 UTC+03:00

Al-Sadd (Qatar)	2 – 1	(Uzbekistan) Pakhtakor
Lee Jung-Soo 45'; Afif 61'	Report	Abdukholiqov 57'

Jassim bin Hamad Stadium, Al Rayyan
Attendance: 3,782
Referee: Choi Myung-Yong (Korea Republic)

5 April 2011
18:15 UTC+03:00

Al-Sadd (Qatar)	1 – 0	(Saudi Arabia) Al-Nassr
Lee Jung-Soo 61'	Report

Jassim bin Hamad Stadium, Al Rayyan
Attendance: 8,603
Referee: Mohamed Al Zarooni (UAE)
6 April 2011
17:30 UTC+04:30

Esteghlal (Iran)	4 – 2	(Uzbekistan) Pakhtakor
Hawar 12'; Majidi 23'; Seyed-Salehi 57'; Borhani 90+3'	Report	Savić 4'; Shikhov 90'

Azadi Stadium, Tehran
Attendance: 17,654
Referee: Ali Al Badwawi (UAE)

19 April 2011
18:00 UTC+05:00

Pakhtakor (Uzbekistan)	2 – 1	(Iran) Esteghlal
Andreev 28'; Krimets 88'	Report	Borhani 45'

Pakhtakor Markaziy Stadium, Tashkent
Attendance: 7,000
Referee: Yuichi Nishimura (Japan)
19 April 2011
20:40 UTC+03:00

Al-Nassr (Saudi Arabia)	1 – 1	(Qatar) Al-Sadd
Sulaimani 75'	Report	Siddiq 37'

King Fahd International Stadium, Riyadh
Attendance: 18,421
Referee: Tan Hai (China PR)

3 May 2011
18:25 UTC+03:00

Al-Sadd (Qatar)	2 – 2	(Iran) Esteghlal
Ibrahim 54'; Al-Haydos 76'	Report	Majidi 6', 37'

Jassim bin Hamad Stadium, Al Rayyan
Attendance: 5,060
Referee: Ben Williams (Australia)
4 May 2011
20:45 UTC+03:00

Al-Nassr (Saudi Arabia)	4 – 0	(Uzbekistan) Pakhtakor
Hamood 8'; Al-Mutwa 24', 65'; Al-Sahlawi 61'	Report

King Fahd International Stadium, Riyadh
Attendance: 4,034
Referee: Peter Green (Australia)

11 May 2011
18:00 UTC+05:00

Pakhtakor (Uzbekistan)	1 – 1	(Qatar) Al-Sadd
Andreev 60'	Report	Siddiq 90+3'

Pakhtakor Markaziy Stadium, Tashkent
Attendance: 2,950
Referee: Andre El Haddad (Lebanon)
11 May 2011
18:00 UTC+04:30

Esteghlal (Iran)	2 – 1	(Saudi Arabia) Al-Nassr
Majidi 62'; Hawar 89'	Report	Al-Mutwa 60'

Azadi Stadium, Tehran
Attendance: 85,422
Referee: Masaaki Toma (Japan)

=== Group C ===
Pos	Team	Pld	W	D	L	GF	GA	GD	Pts	Qualification	ITT	BUN	WAH	PER
1	(Saudi Arabia) Al-Ittihad Jeddah	6	3	2	1	10	5	+5	11	Advance to knockout stage	—	1–1	0–0	3–1
2	(Uzbekistan) Bunyodkor	6	2	3	1	8	6	+2	9	Advance to knockout stage	0–1	—	3–2	0–0
3	(United Arab Emirates) Al-Wahda	6	1	3	2	6	8	−2	6		0–3	1–1	—	2–0
4	(Iran) Persepolis	6	1	2	3	6	11	−5	5		3–2	1–3	1–1	—

2 March 2011
20:00 UTC+04:00

Al-Wahda (United Arab Emirates)	1 – 1	(Uzbekistan) Bunyodkor
Hugo 88'	Report	Haydarov 85'

Al-Nahyan Stadium, Abu Dhabi
Attendance: 5,622
Referee: Ben Williams (Australia)
2 March 2011
20:35 UTC+03:00

Al-Ittihad (Saudi Arabia)	3 – 1	(Iran) Persepolis
Ziaya 13', 75'; Noor 48' (pen.)	Report	Zare 19'

Prince Abdullah al-Faisal Stadium, Jeddah
Attendance: 10,787
Referee: Subkhiddin Mohd Salleh (Malaysia)

16 March 2011
17:00 UTC+05:00

Bunyodkor (Uzbekistan)	0 – 1	(Saudi Arabia) Al-Ittihad
	Report	Al-Muwallad 34'

JAR Stadium, Tashkent
Attendance: 6,150
Referee: Masaaki Toma (Japan)
16 March 2011
17:30 UTC+03:30

Persepolis (Iran)	1 – 1	(United Arab Emirates) Al-Wahda
Badamaki 66'	Report	Ameen 54'

Azadi Stadium, Tehran
Attendance: 15,000
Referee: Yuichi Nishimura (Japan)

5 April 2011
18:00 UTC+05:00

Bunyodkor (Uzbekistan)	0 – 0	(Iran) Persepolis
	Report

JAR Stadium, Tashkent
Attendance: 7,000
Referee: Nawaf Shukralla (Bahrain)
5 April 2011
20:20 UTC+04:00

Al-Wahda (United Arab Emirates)	0 – 3	(Saudi Arabia) Al-Ittihad
	Report	Ziaya 33'; Abushgeer 45+1'; Paulo Jorge 87'

Al-Nahyan Stadium, Abu Dhabi
Attendance: 7,873
Referee: Abdulrahman Abdou (Qatar)

20 April 2011
17:30 UTC+03:30

Persepolis (Iran)	1 – 3	(Uzbekistan) Bunyodkor
Arifi 87'	Report	Rajabov 60'; Karimov 71' (pen.); Karpenko 90+5'

Azadi Stadium, Tehran
Attendance: 31,765
Referee: Abdullah Balideh (Qatar)
20 April 2011
21:00 UTC+03:00

Al-Ittihad (Saudi Arabia)	0 – 0	(United Arab Emirates) Al-Wahda
	Report

Prince Abdullah al-Faisal Stadium, Jeddah
Attendance: 6,546
Referee: Kim Dong-Jin (Korea Republic)

3 May 2011
17:30 UTC+04:30

Persepolis (Iran)	3 – 2	(Saudi Arabia) Al-Ittihad
Ali Asgari 14', 69'; Arifi 16'	Report	Al-Rashid 19', 90+4'

Azadi Stadium, Tehran
Attendance: 25,486
Referee: Muhsen Basma (Syria)
3 May 2011
18:00 UTC+05:00

Bunyodkor (Uzbekistan)	3 – 2	(United Arab Emirates) Al-Wahda
Trifunović 11', 35'; Soliev 85'	Report	Matar 2'; Hugo 54' (pen.)

JAR Stadium, Tashkent
Attendance: 7,600
Referee: Subkhiddin Mohd Salleh (Malaysia)

10 May 2011
20:30 UTC+04:00

Al-Wahda (United Arab Emirates)	2 – 0	(Iran) Persepolis
Saleh 13'; Al Shehhi 70'	Report

Al-Nahyan Stadium, Abu Dhabi
Attendance: 1,900
Referee: Abdullah Al Hilali (Oman)
10 May 2011
21:10 UTC+03:00

Al-Ittihad (Saudi Arabia)	1 – 1	(Uzbekistan) Bunyodkor
Assis 30'	Report	Trifunović 14'

Prince Abdullah al-Faisal Stadium, Jeddah
Attendance: 7,882
Referee: Yuichi Nishimura (Japan)

=== Group D ===
Pos	Team	Pld	W	D	L	GF	GA	GD	Pts	Qualification	ZOB	SHA	EMI	RAY
1	(Iran) Zob Ahan	6	4	1	1	7	3	+4	13	Advance to knockout stage	—	0–1	2–1	1–0
2	(Saudi Arabia) Al-Shabab	6	3	2	1	8	4	+4	11	Advance to knockout stage	0–0	—	4–1	1–0
3	(United Arab Emirates) Emirates	6	2	0	4	6	10	−4	6		0–1	2–1	—	2–0
4	(Qatar) Al-Rayyan	6	1	1	4	4	8	−4	4		1–3	1–1	2–0	—

2 March 2011
18:30 UTC+03:30

Zob Ahan (Iran)	2 – 1	(United Arab Emirates) Emirates
Hosseini 45+1'; Igor Castro 53'	Report	Daoudi 39'

Foolad Shahr Stadium, Isfahan
Attendance: 3,480
Referee: Valentin Kovalenko (Uzbekistan)
2 March 2011
18:15 UTC+03:00

Al-Rayyan (Qatar)	1 – 1	(Saudi Arabia) Al-Shabab
Itamar 34' (pen.)	Report	Al-Shamrani 59'

Ahmed bin Ali Stadium, Al Rayyan
Attendance: 3,509
Referee: Yuichi Nishimura (Japan)

16 March 2011
19:15 UTC+04:00

Emirates (United Arab Emirates)	2 – 0	(Qatar) Al-Rayyan
Daoudi 5'; Ahmed 24'	Report

Emirates Club Stadium, Ras al-Khaimah
Attendance: 5,150
Referee: Lee Min-Hu (Korea Republic)
16 March 2011
20:00 UTC+03:00

Al-Shabab (Saudi Arabia)	0 – 0	(Iran) Zob Ahan
	Report

Prince Faisal bin Fahd Stadium, Riyadh
Attendance: 3,920
Referee: Nawaf Shukralla (Bahrain)

6 April 2011
18:30 UTC+03:00

Al-Rayyan (Qatar)	1 – 3	(Iran) Zob Ahan
Al Marri 13'	Report	Khalatbari 11'; Igor Castro 24'; Hadadifar 71'

Ahmed bin Ali Stadium, Al Rayyan
Attendance: 3,009
Referee: Andre El Haddad (Lebanon)
6 April 2011
20:05 UTC+03:00

Al-Shabab (Saudi Arabia)	4 – 1	(United Arab Emirates) Emirates
Keita 45+4', 50'; Muath 74'; Shuhail 85'	Report	Daoudi 5'

Prince Faisal bin Fahd Stadium, Riyadh
Attendance: 4,652
Referee: Masaaki Toma (Japan)

19 April 2011
19:30 UTC+04:00

Emirates (United Arab Emirates)	2 – 1	(Saudi Arabia) Al-Shabab
Bouguèche 25', 41'	Report	Bin Saran 45'

Emirates Club Stadium, Ras al-Khaimah
Attendance: 5,250
Referee: Choi Myung-Yong (Korea Republic)
19 April 2011
20:00 UTC+04:30

Zob Ahan (Iran)	1 – 0	(Qatar) Al-Rayyan
Farhadi 21'	Report

Foolad Shahr Stadium, Isfahan
Attendance: 3,351
Referee: Minoru Tōjō (Japan)

3 May 2011
19:35 UTC+04:00

Emirates (United Arab Emirates)	0 – 1	(Iran) Zob Ahan
	Report	Ghazi 80'

Emirates Club Stadium, Ras al-Khaimah
Attendance: 5,450
Referee: Malik Abdul Bashir (Singapore)
3 May 2011
20:20 UTC+03:00

Al-Shabab (Saudi Arabia)	1 – 0	(Qatar) Al-Rayyan
Al-Shamrani 76'	Report

Prince Faisal bin Fahd Stadium, Riyadh
Attendance: 4,000
Referee: Abdullah Al Hilali (Oman)

10 May 2011
18:50 UTC+03:00

Al-Rayyan (Qatar)	2 – 0	(United Arab Emirates) Emirates
Ghafoor Murad 74'; Alaaeldin 90+5'	Report

Ahmed bin Ali Stadium, Al Rayyan
Attendance: 607
Referee: Nawaf Shukralla (Bahrain)
10 May 2011
20:30 UTC+04:30

Zob Ahan (Iran)	0 – 1	(Saudi Arabia) Al-Shabab
	Report	Bin Sultan 57'

Foolad Shahr Stadium, Isfahan
Attendance: 4,160
Referee: Ravshan Irmatov (Uzbekistan)

=== Group E ===
Pos	Team	Pld	W	D	L	GF	GA	GD	Pts	Qualification	GAM	TIA	JEJ	MEL
1	(Japan) Gamba Osaka	6	3	1	2	13	7	+6	10 (Note: Tiebreakers: Gamba Osaka and Tianjin Teda are ranked by their head-to-head records: Gamba Osaka (3 pts, +1 GD), Tianjin Teda (3 pts, –1 GD).)	Advance to knockout stage	—	2–0	3–1	5–1
2	(China) Tianjin Teda	6	3	1	2	8	6	+2	10	Advance to knockout stage	2–1	—	3–0	1–1
3	(South Korea) Jeju United	6	2	1	3	6	10	−4	7		2–1	0–1	—	1–1
4	(Australia) Melbourne Victory	6	1	3	2	7	11	−4	6		1–1	2–1	1–2	—

Notes:
1 March 2011
15:00 UTC+09:00

Jeju United (South Korea)	0 – 1	(China) Tianjin Teda
	Report	Yu Dabao 55'

Jeju World Cup Stadium, Jeju
Attendance: 5,245
Referee: Abdullah Al Hilali (Oman)
1 March 2011
19:00 UTC+09:00

Gamba Osaka (Japan)	5 – 1	(Australia) Melbourne Victory
Takei 4'; Adriano 7' (pen.); Lee Keun-Ho 10'; Futagawa 62'; Kim Seung-Yong 90+1'	Report	Muscat 21' (pen.)

Osaka Expo '70 Stadium, Suita
Attendance: 12,949
Referee: Ali Al Badwawi (UAE)

15 March 2011
19:30 UTC+11:00

Melbourne Victory (Australia)	1 – 2	(South Korea) Jeju United
Allsopp 37'	Report	Park Hyun-Beom 41'; Lee Hyun-Ho 84'

Docklands Stadium, Melbourne
Attendance: 4,825
Referee: Subkhiddin Mohd Salleh (Malaysia)
15 March 2011
19:30 UTC+08:00

Tianjin Teda (China)	2 – 1	(Japan) Gamba Osaka
Chen Tao 25'; Cao Yang 53' (pen.)	Report	Lee Keun-Ho 31'

TEDA Football Stadium, Tianjin
Attendance: 26,866
Referee: Abdullah Balideh (Qatar)

5 April 2011
19:30 UTC+09:00

Jeju United (South Korea)	2 – 1	(Japan) Gamba Osaka
Shin Young-Rok 53'; Bae Ki-Jong 64'	Report	Nakazawa 23'

Jeju World Cup Stadium, Jeju
Attendance: 2,167
Referee: Mohsen Torky (Iran)
5 April 2011
19:30 UTC+08:00

Tianjin Teda (China)	1 – 1	(Australia) Melbourne Victory
Zorić 19'	Report	Muscat 52'

TEDA Football Stadium, Tianjin
Attendance: 25,456
Referee: Valentin Kovalenko (Uzbekistan)

20 April 2011
19:30 UTC+10:00

Melbourne Victory (Australia)	2 – 1	(China) Tianjin Teda
Hernández 44'; Muscat 45+1' (pen.)	Report	Chen Tao 37'

Docklands Stadium, Melbourne
Attendance: 5,693
Referee: Alireza Faghani (Iran)
20 April 2011
19:00 UTC+09:00

Gamba Osaka (Japan)	3 – 1	(South Korea) Jeju United
Adriano 26', 48'; Takei 88'	Report	Shin Young-Rok 67'

Osaka Expo '70 Stadium, Suita
Attendance: 11,398
Referee: Ravshan Irmatov (Uzbekistan)

4 May 2011
19:30 UTC+10:00

Melbourne Victory (Australia)	1 – 1	(Japan) Gamba Osaka
Leijer 12'	Report	Nakazawa 43'

Docklands Stadium, Melbourne
Attendance: 7,437
Referee: Abdulrahman Abdou (Qatar)
4 May 2011
19:30 UTC+08:00

Tianjin Teda (China)	3 – 0	(South Korea) Jeju United
Olguín 8'; Wu Weian 21'; Cao Yang 72' (pen.)	Report

TEDA Football Stadium, Tianjin
Attendance: 26,683
Referee: Mohamed Al Zarooni (UAE)

11 May 2011
19:00 UTC+09:00

Gamba Osaka (Japan)	2 – 0	(China) Tianjin Teda
Endo 74'; Usami 90+4' (pen.)	Report

Osaka Expo '70 Stadium, Suita
Attendance: 7,939
Referee: Saeid Mozaffarizadeh (Iran)
11 May 2011
19:30 UTC+09:00

Jeju United (South Korea)	1 – 1	(Australia) Melbourne Victory
Kim Eun-Jung 25'	Report	Ferreira 61'

Jeju World Cup Stadium, Jeju
Attendance: 1,519
Referee: Valentin Kovalenko (Uzbekistan)

=== Group F ===
Pos	Team	Pld	W	D	L	GF	GA	GD	Pts	Qualification	SEO	NAG	AIN	HAN
1	(South Korea) FC Seoul	6	3	2	1	9	4	+5	11	Advance to knockout stage	—	0–2	3–0	3–0
2	(Japan) Nagoya Grampus	6	3	1	2	9	6	+3	10	Advance to knockout stage	1–1	—	4–0	1–0
3	(United Arab Emirates) Al-Ain	6	2	1	3	4	9	−5	7		0–1	3–1	—	1–0
4	(China) Hangzhou Greentown	6	1	2	3	3	6	−3	5		1–1	2–0	0–0	—

Source: Stats.The-AFC.com
1 March 2011
19:35 UTC+08:00

Hangzhou Greentown (China)	2 – 0	(Japan) Nagoya Grampus
Ramírez 60'; Bari 86'	Report

Zheijiang Dragon Stadium, Hangzhou
Attendance: 28,674
Referee: Abdulrahman Abdou (Qatar)
2 March 2011
19:05 UTC+04:00

Al-Ain (United Arab Emirates)	0 – 1	(South Korea) FC Seoul
	Report	Damjanović 25'

Tahnoun bin Mohammed Stadium, Al Ain
Attendance: 5,128
Referee: Alireza Faghani (Iran)

15 March 2011
20:00 UTC+09:00

FC Seoul (South Korea)	3 – 0	(China) Hangzhou Greentown
Damjanović 16'; Ou Kyoung-Jun 70'; Molina 80'	Report

Seoul World Cup Stadium, Seoul
Attendance: 6,103
Referee: Ravshan Irmatov (Uzbekistan)

6 April 2011
19:00 UTC+09:00

Nagoya Grampus (Japan)	1 – 1	(South Korea) FC Seoul
Nagai 14'	Report	Choi Hyun-Tae 61'

Mizuho Athletic Stadium, Nagoya
Attendance: 7,348
Referee: Khalil Al Ghamdi (Saudi Arabia)
6 April 2011
20:00 UTC+08:00

Hangzhou Greentown (China)	0 – 0	(United Arab Emirates) Al-Ain
	Report

Zheijiang Dragon Stadium, Hangzhou
Attendance: 26,973
Referee: Saeid Mozaffarizadeh (Iran)

12 April 2011^{1}
19:00 UTC+09:00

Nagoya Grampus (Japan)	4 – 0	(United Arab Emirates) Al-Ain
Kanazaki 27', 45+1'; Keita 61' (o.g.); Fujimoto 77'	Report

Mizuho Athletic Stadium, Nagoya
Attendance: 5,914
Referee: Subkhiddin Mohd Salleh (Malaysia)

19 April 2011
20:00 UTC+09:00

FC Seoul (South Korea)	0 – 2	(Japan) Nagoya Grampus
	Report	Kanazaki 26'; Nagai 81'

Seoul World Cup Stadium, Seoul
Attendance: 10,927
Referee: Mohsen Torky (Iran)
19 April 2011
19:30 UTC+04:00

Al-Ain (United Arab Emirates)	1 – 0	(China) Hangzhou Greentown
Abdulrahman 60'	Report

Tahnoun bin Mohammed Stadium, Al Ain
Attendance: 2,324
Referee: Valentin Kovalenko (Uzbekistan)

4 May 2011
14:00 UTC+09:00

Nagoya Grampus (Japan)	1 – 0	(China) Hangzhou Greentown
Fujimoto 77' (pen.)	Report

Mizuho Athletic Stadium, Nagoya
Attendance: 13,767
Referee: Nawaf Shukralla (Bahrain)
4 May 2011
20:00 UTC+09:00

FC Seoul (South Korea)	3 – 0	(United Arab Emirates) Al-Ain
Ko Yo-Han 16'; Damjanović 39', 72'	Report

Seoul World Cup Stadium, Seoul
Attendance: 23,623
Referee: Abdullah Balideh (Qatar)

11 May 2011
20:00 UTC+08:00

Hangzhou Greentown (China)	1 – 1	(South Korea) FC Seoul
Zeng Yue 90+2'	Report	Bang Seung-Hwan 66'

Zheijiang Dragon Stadium, Hangzhou
Attendance: 12,178
Referee: Alireza Faghani (Iran)
11 May 2011
19:40 UTC+04:00

Al-Ain (United Arab Emirates)	3 – 1	(Japan) Nagoya Grampus
Al Merri 21'; Elias 39', 50' (pen.)	Report	Fujimoto 49'

Tahnoun bin Mohammed Stadium, Al Ain
Attendance: 892
Referee: Muhsen Basma (Syria)

Notes

- Note 1: Nagoya Grampus v Al-Ain postponed from 15 March 2011 to 12 April 2011 due to earthquake in Japan.

=== Group G ===
Pos	Team	Pld	W	D	L	GF	GA	GD	Pts	Qualification	JEO	CER	SHL	ARE
1	(South Korea) Jeonbuk Hyundai Motors	6	5	0	1	14	2	+12	15	Advance to knockout stage	—	1–0	1–0	6–0
2	(Japan) Cerezo Osaka	6	4	0	2	11	4	+7	12	Advance to knockout stage	1–0	—	4–0	2–1
3	(China) Shandong Luneng	6	2	1	3	9	8	+1	7		1–2	2–0	—	5–0
4	(Indonesia) Arema	6	0	1	5	2	22	−20	1		0–4	0–4	1–1	—

2 March 2011
19:00 UTC+09:00

Jeonbuk Hyundai Motors (South Korea)	1 – 0	(China) Shandong Luneng
Park Won-Jae 59'	Report

Jeonju World Cup Stadium, Jeonju
Attendance: 3,826
Referee: Peter Green (Australia)
2 March 2011
19:00 UTC+09:00

Cerezo Osaka (Japan)	2 – 1	(Indonesia) Arema
Rodrigo Pimpão 14', 76'	Report	Alam Shah 50' (pen.)

Nagai Stadium, Osaka
Attendance: 10,856
Referee: Mohsen Torky (Iran)

16 March 2011
15:30 UTC+08:00

Shandong Luneng (China)	2 – 0	(Japan) Cerezo Osaka
Renato Silva 22'; Wang Yongpo 32'	Report

Shandong Stadium, Jinan
Attendance: 20,821
Referee: Khalil Al Ghamdi (Saudi Arabia)
16 March 2011
15:30 UTC+07:00

Arema (Indonesia)	0 – 4	(South Korea) Jeonbuk Hyundai Motors
	Report	Kim Ji-Woong 25'; Huang Bowen 77'; Luiz Henrique 82', 88'

Kanjuruhan Stadium, Malang
Attendance: 30,000
Referee: Andre El Haddad (Lebanon)

5 April 2011
15:30 UTC+07:00

Arema (Indonesia)	1 – 1	(China) Shandong Luneng
Fakhrudin 90+3' (pen.)	Report	Obina 8'

Kanjuruhan Stadium, Malang
Attendance: 5,600
Referee: Alireza Faghani (Iran)
5 April 2011
19:00 UTC+09:00

Cerezo Osaka (Japan)	1 – 0	(South Korea) Jeonbuk Hyundai Motors
Inui 53'	Report

Nagai Stadium, Osaka
Attendance: 11,351
Referee: Ravshan Irmatov (Uzbekistan)

20 April 2011
15:30 UTC+08:00

Shandong Luneng (China)	5 – 0	(Indonesia) Arema
Deng Zhuoxiang 25'; Obina 44'; Han Peng 71'; Mozhapa 81'; Wang Yongpo 90+2'	Report

Shandong Stadium, Jinan
Attendance: 10,059
Referee: Ali Al Badwawi (UAE)
20 April 2011
19:00 UTC+09:00

Jeonbuk Hyundai Motors (South Korea)	1 – 0	(Japan) Cerezo Osaka
Lee Dong-Gook 77'	Report

Jeonju World Cup Stadium, Jeonju
Attendance: 7,892
Referee: Mohamed Al Zarooni (UAE)

3 May 2011
15:30 UTC+07:00

Arema (Indonesia)	0 – 4	(Japan) Cerezo Osaka
	Report	Kiyotake 30'; Rodrigo Pimpão 43'; Inui 46', 60'

Kanjuruhan Stadium, Malang
Attendance: 4,000
Referee: Khalil Al Ghamdi (Saudi Arabia)
3 May 2011
19:30 UTC+08:00

Shandong Luneng (China)	1 – 2	(South Korea) Jeonbuk Hyundai Motors
Zhou Haibin 40'	Report	Lee Dong-Gook 31', 53'

Shandong Stadium, Jinan
Attendance: 17,343
Referee: Saeid Mozaffarizadeh (Iran)

10 May 2011
15:00 UTC+09:00

Jeonbuk Hyundai Motors (South Korea)	6 – 0	(Indonesia) Arema
Lovrek 1', 45+2', 60'; Kim Dong-Chan 9'; Jeong Shung-Hoon 27'; Kang Seung-Jo 77'	Report

Jeonju World Cup Stadium, Jeonju
Attendance: 6,439
Referee: Abdulrahman Abdou (Qatar)
10 May 2011
19:00 UTC+09:00

Cerezo Osaka (Japan)	4 – 0	(China) Shandong Luneng
Rodrigo Pimpão 39'; Kiyotake 47'; Inui 73'; Kurata 81'	Report

Nagai Stadium, Osaka
Attendance: 9,035
Referee: Abdullah Balideh (Qatar)

=== Group H ===
Pos	Team	Pld	W	D	L	GF	GA	GD	Pts	Qualification	SUW	KSH	SYD	SHS
1	(South Korea) Suwon Samsung Bluewings	6	3	3	0	12	3	+9	12 (Note: Tiebreakers: Suwon Samsung Bluewings and Kashima Antlers are also tied on their head-to-head records (2 pts, 0 GD, 2 GF), and so are ranked by their overall goal difference.)	Advance to knockout stage	—	1–1	3–1	4–0
2	(Japan) Kashima Antlers	6	3	3	0	9	3	+6	12	Advance to knockout stage	1–1	—	2–1	2–0
3	(Australia) Sydney FC	6	1	2	3	6	11	−5	5		0–0	0–3	—	1–1
4	(China) Shanghai Shenhua	6	0	2	4	3	13	−10	2		0–3	0–0	2–3	—

Notes:
2 March 2011
20:00 UTC+11:00

Sydney FC (Australia)	0 – 0	(South Korea) Suwon Samsung Bluewings
	Report

Sydney Football Stadium, Sydney
Attendance: 7,095
Referee: Malik Abdul Bashir (Singapore)
2 March 2011
20:00 UTC+08:00

Shanghai Shenhua (China)	0 – 0	(Japan) Kashima Antlers
	Report

Hongkou Stadium, Shanghai
Attendance: 20,036
Referee: Khalil Al Ghamdi (Saudi Arabia)

16 March 2011
19:30 UTC+09:00

Suwon Samsung Bluewings (South Korea)	4 – 0	(China) Shanghai Shenhua
Ha Tae-Gyun 2', 60', 76'; Oh Jang-Eun 42'	Report

Suwon World Cup Stadium, Suwon
Attendance: 5,393
Referee: Mohamed Al Zarooni (UAE)

6 April 2011
20:00 UTC+10:00

Sydney FC (Australia)	1 – 1	(China) Shanghai Shenhua
Carle 12'	Report	Riascos 6'

Sydney Football Stadium, Sydney
Attendance: 7,007
Referee: Abdullah Balideh (Qatar)
6 April 2011
19:30 UTC+09:00

Suwon Samsung Bluewings (South Korea)	1 – 1	(Japan) Kashima Antlers
Yeom Ki-Hoon 67'	Report	K. Nakata 71'

Suwon World Cup Stadium, Suwon
Attendance: 7,689
Referee: Abdullah Al Hilali (Oman)

13 April 2011^{2}
20:00 UTC+10:00

Sydney FC (Australia)	0 – 3	(Japan) Kashima Antlers
	Report	Nozawa 41'; Gabriel 51'; Koroki 90+2'

Sydney Football Stadium, Sydney
Attendance: 7,320
Referee: Ali Al Badwawi (UAE)

19 April 2011
14:00 UTC+09:00

Kashima Antlers (Japan)	1 – 1	(South Korea) Suwon Samsung Bluewings
Tashiro 55'	Report	Yeom Ki-Hun 48'

National Olympic Stadium, Tokyo^{2}
Attendance: 4,619
Referee: Abdulrahman Abdou (Qatar)
19 April 2011
20:00 UTC+08:00

Shanghai Shenhua (China)	2 – 3	(Australia) Sydney FC
Jiang Jiajun 8'; Jamieson 52' (o.g.)	Report	Cazarine 45+1', 59'; Bridge 90+3'

Hongkou Stadium, Shanghai
Attendance: 10,215
Referee: Subkhiddin Mohd Salleh (Malaysia)

3 May 2011
15:00 UTC+09:00

Kashima Antlers (Japan)	2 – 0	(China) Shanghai Shenhua
Koroki 32', 80'	Report

National Olympic Stadium, Tokyo^{2}
Attendance: 11,954
Referee: Andre El Haddad (Lebanon)
3 May 2011
19:30 UTC+09:00

Suwon Samsung Bluewings (South Korea)	3 – 1	(Australia) Sydney FC
Ha Tae-Gyun 34'; Neretljak 50'; Yeom Ki-Hoon 80'	Report	Cazarine 51'

Suwon World Cup Stadium, Suwon
Attendance: 9,495
Referee: Ravshan Irmatov (Uzbekistan)

10 May 2011^{2}
15:00 UTC+09:00

Kashima Antlers (Japan)	2 – 1	(Australia) Sydney FC
Osako 64'; Nozawa 84'	Report	Jurman 26'

National Olympic Stadium, Tokyo^{2}
Attendance: 3,164
Referee: Khalil Al Ghamdi (Saudi Arabia)
10 May 2011
20:00 UTC+08:00

Shanghai Shenhua (China)	0 – 3	(South Korea) Suwon Samsung Bluewings
	Report	Ha Tae-Gyun 13', 55'; Shin Se-Gye 89'

Hongkou Stadium, Shanghai
Attendance: 6,730
Referee: Mohsen Torky (Iran)

Notes

- Note 2: The Kashima Antlers v Sydney FC match was postponed from 16 March 2011 to 10 May 2011 due to the 2011 Tōhoku earthquake and tsunami in Japan. The return match, Sydney FC v Kashima Antlers, was brought forward from 10 May 2011 to 13 April 2011. All home matches of the Kashima Antlers were moved to the National Olympic Stadium in Tokyo as the Kashima Soccer Stadium in Kashima was damaged in the earthquake.
