= Masaaki Toma =

Japanese football referee

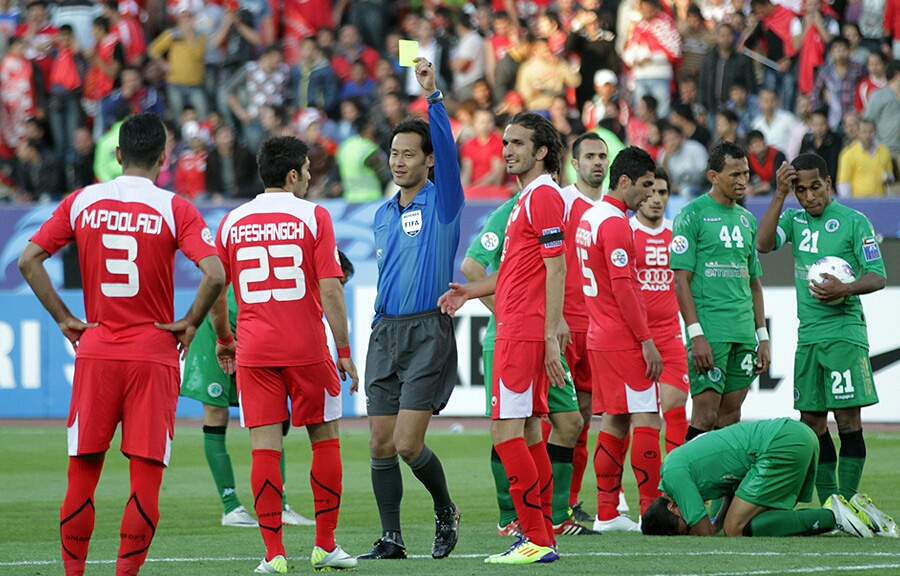
- Full name: Masaaki Toma
- Born: June 2, 1973 (age 53); Hiroshima, Japan

Domestic
Years	League	Role
2008–present	J-League	Referee

International
Years	League	Role
2005–2016	FIFA	Referee

Masaaki Toma (當麻 政明, Tōma Masaaki), born Masaaki Iemoto (家本 政明, Iemoto Masaaki), is a professional Japanese football referee. He has been refereeing in the J-League since 2008 and has officiated a number of international club and country matches.

== Career ==
Toma's first J-League game was in 2008, when he officiated the match between Omiya Ardija and Jubilo Iwata. Toma has also officiated in the Asian Champions League. In November 2011, Toma became the first foreign referee ever to be invited to officiate in a match in England's FA Cup when he was chosen to referee the First Round match between Brentford and Basingstoke Town.

=== International Matches officiated ===
Since officiating his first international match in 2005, Toma has officiated 4 matches. His most notable fixture to date has been a friendly between England and Mexico in 2010.

Date	Home	Away	Result	Competition
July 30, 2008	India	Afghanistan	1 – 0	2008 AFC Challenge Cup
August 2, 2008	Nepal	North Korea	0 – 1	2008 AFC Challenge Cup
August 7, 2008	North Korea	Tajikistan	0 – 1	2008 AFC Challenge Cup
January 14, 2009	Vietnam	Lebanon	3 – 1	2011 AFC Asian Cup qualification
August 12, 2009	South Korea	Paraguay	1 – 0	Friendly Match
October 14, 2009	Australia	Oman	1 – 0	2011 AFC Asian Cup qualification
May 24, 2010	England	Mexico	3 – 1	Friendly Match
November 17, 2010	Poland	Ivory Coast	3 – 1	Friendly Match
Dectember 26, 2010	Malaysia	Indonesia	3 – 0	2010 AFF Suzuki Cup
September 2, 2011	Iran	Indonesia	3 – 0	2014 FIFA World Cup qualification – AFC third round
October 11, 2011	Lebanon	Kuwait	2 – 2	2014 FIFA World Cup qualification – AFC third round
February 29, 2012	Oman	Thailand	2 – 0	2014 FIFA World Cup qualification – AFC third round
December 19, 2012	Singapore	Thailand	3 – 1	2012 AFF Suzuki Cup - Final (First leg)
August 14, 2013	Singapore	Oman	0 – 2	2015 AFC Asian Cup qualification
November 15, 2013	Saudi Arabia	Iraq	2 – 1	2015 AFC Asian Cup qualification
December 11, 2014	Vietnam	Malaysia	2 – 4	2014 AFF Championship Semi-Final Second Leg
September 8, 2015	Thailand	Iraq	2 – 2	2018 FIFA World Cup qualification – AFC second round
October 8, 2015	Jordan	Australia	2 – 0	2018 FIFA World Cup qualification – AFC second round

== See also ==
- List of football referees
