= 2009–10 Zob Ahan F.C. season =

Zob Ahan F.C.
2009–10 season
- Chairman: Asghar Dalili
- Manager: Mansour Ebrahimzadeh
- Iran Pro League: 2nd
- AFC Champions League: -
- Hazfi Cup: Semi-final
- Top goalscorer: League: Mohammad Reza Khalatbari (11); All: Mohammad Reza Khalatbari (15)
Home colours	Away colours

This is a list of Zob Ahan F.C.'s results at the 2009–10 Persian Gulf Cup, 2009–10 Hazfi Cup and 2010 ACL. The club is competing in the Iran Pro League, Hazfi Cup and Asian Champions League.

== Persian Gulf Cup ==
=== Matches ===
Win	Draw	Lose

Last updated 19 May 2010

#	Date	Home	Score	Away	Venue	Goal	Yellow card	Red card	Fans	Ref	Rank
1	7-August–2009	Zob Ahan	3-0	Saipa	Foolad Shahr/Esfahan	Morteza Ebrahimi 2' (o.g.), Mohsen Mosalman 23', Esmail Farhadi 82'	Mohammad Salsali, Mostafa Salehinejad	-	2,000	Yadolah Jahanbazi	1
2	15-August–2009	Tractor Sazi	0-0	Zob Ahan	Yadegar Emam/Tabriz	-	Mohamad Reza Khalatbari, Mostafa Salehinejad	-	35,000	Saeed Mozaffari Zadeh	2
3	21-August–2009	Zob Ahan	3-1	Steel Azin	Foolad Shahr/Esfahan	Esmail Farhadi 32', 52', Sina Ashori 88'	Mohamad Ali Ahmadi, Farsheed Talebi, Sina Ashori	Farsheed Talebi(65)	10,000	Hedayat Mombeini	1
4	28-August–2009	Aboomoslem	1-2	Zob Ahan	Samen/Mashhad	Mohamad Reza Khalatbari 26', 64'	Sina Ashori, Mohamad Ali Ahmadi, Mohamad Reza Khalatbari	-	7.000	Saeed Bakhshi Zadeh	1
5	07-September–2009	Zob Ahan	1-1	Persepolis	Foolad Shahr/Esfahan	Seyed Mohammad Hossaini 58'	Mostafa Salehinejad, Mohsen Mosalman	-	15,000	Alireza Faghani	2
6	13-September–2009	Mes Kerman	5-2	Zob Ahan	Shahid Bahonar /Kerman	Seyed Mohammad Hossaini 61', Mostafa Salehinejad 70'	-	-	12,000	Rahim Mehrpishe	4
7	19-September–2009	Zob Ahan	5-2	Est. Ahvaz	Foolad Shahr/Esfahan	Esmail Farhadi 20', Ghasem Haddadifar 31', Igor Castro 32', Farsheed Talebi 55', Mohamad Ghazi 80'	Alireza Haddadifar, Sina Ashori, Mohamad Ghazi	-	2,000	Mohsen Torki	3
8	24-September–2009	Pas Hamedan	1-1	Zob Ahan	Ghods /Hamedan	Ghasem Haddadifar 18'	Mohammad Mansori, Shahabeddin Gordan, Ghasem Haddadifar	-	3,000	Hedayat Mombeini	3
9	1-October–2009	Zob Ahan	2-1	Saba QOM	Foolad Shahr/Esfahan	Igor Castro 41', Mohamad Reza Khalatbari 86'	Farsheed Talebi	-	3,000	Mohsen Ghahremani	3
10	6-October–2009	Zob Ahan	0-0	Sepahan	Foolad Shahr/Esfahan	-	Hassan Ashjari	-	13,000	Masoud Moradi	3
11	11-October–2009	Shahin Bushehr	1-1	Zob Ahan	Shahid Beheshti /Bushehr	Mohamad Reza Khalatbari 31'	Jalal Omidian	-	20,000	Toraj Haghverdi	3
12	16-October–2009	Zob Ahan	1-2	Rah Ahan	Foolad Shahr/Esfahan	Esmail Farhadi 3'	Sina Ashori	-	2,000	Farshid Afshar	4
13	23-October–2009	Paykan	1-1	Zob Ahan	Shahid Rajaei /Qazvin	Seyed Mohammad Hossaini 67'	Mohammad Salsali, Mostafa Salehi Nejad, Ghasem Hadadifar	-	3,000	Shahin Hajbabaei	4
14	6-November–2009	Zob Ahan	1-0	Esteghlal	Foolad Shahr/Esfahan	Mohamad Reza Khalatbari 23'	Seyed Mohammad Hossaini, Mohamad Reza Khalatbari	-	15,000	Saeed Mozaffari Zadeh	3
15	2-November–2009	Moghavemat	0-2	Zob Ahan	Hafezieh/Shiraz	Mohammad Mansori 62', Mohamad Ghazi 90'	Sina Ashori	-	8,000	Gholam Reza Jabari	3
16	7-November–2009	Zob Ahan	1-0	Foolad	Foolad Shahr/Esfahan	Igor Castro 78'	-	-	3,000	Rasol Rahbar Fam	2
17	27-November–2009	Malavan	0-1	Zob Ahan	Takhti/Anzali	Mohamad Ghazi 68'	Mohammad Salsali, Igor Castro, Shahabeddin Gordan	-	10,000	Masoud Moradi	2
18	4-December–2009	Saipa	2-1	Zob Ahan	Enghelab/Karaj	Ghasem Hadadifar 39'	Ghasem Hadadifar	-	1,000	Shahin Hajbabaei	2
19	11-December–2009	Zob Ahan	1-0	Tractor Sazi	Foolad Shahr/Esfahan	Mohamad Reza Khalatbari 87'	Mohamad Reza Khalatbari, Mohsen Mosalman	-	3,000	Mohsen Ghahremani	2
20	17-December–2009	Steel Azin	2-2	Zob Ahan	Takhti/ Tehran	Mohamad Reza Khalatbari 45+2', Seyed Mohammad Hossaini 52'	Mohammad Salsali, Mohsen Mosalman, Sina Ashori	-	1,000	Toraj Haghverdi	2
21	23-December–2009	Zob Ahan	3-1	Aboomoslem	Foolad Shahr/Esfahan	Mohammad Salsali 10'(P), Seyed Mohammad Hossaini 76', Mohamad Reza Khalatbari 87'	-	-	3000	Navid Mozaffari	2
22	9-January–2010	Persepolis	1-1	Zob Ahan	Azadi /Tehran	Kayvon Amraei 86'	Mohamad Ali Ahmadi	-	20000	Mohsen Ghahremani	2
23	16-January–2010	Zob Ahan	0-0	Mes Kerman	Foolad Shahr/Esfahan	-	Mohammad Salsali, Hassan Ashjari, Babak Razi, Ghasem Haddadifar	-	3000	Saeed Bakhshi Zadeh	2
24	22-January–2010	Est. Ahvaz	1-2	Zob Ahan	Takhti/Ahvaz	Mohamad Reza Khalatbari 60', Esmail Farhadi 73'	Mohamad Reza Khalatbari, Mohamad Ali Ahmadi	-	4000	Shahin Hajbabaei	2
25	5-February–2010	Zob Ahan	0-1	Pas Hamedan	Foolad Shahr/Esfahan	-	Hassan Ashjari	Mohamad Ali Ahmadi(85), Mohamad Reza Khalatbari(90)	3000	Mahmoud Rafiei	2
26	2-February–2010	Saba Qom	1-1	Zob Ahan	Yadegar Emam/ Qom	Payam Sadeghian 65'	Kayvon Amraei, Ghasem Haddadifar, Hassan Ashjari	-	5000	Khodadad Afsharian	2
27	17-February–2010	Sepahan	0-1	Zob Ahan	Foolad Shahr/Esfahan	Seyed Mohammad Hossaini 70'	-	-	12000	Mohsen Torki	2
28	5-March-2010	Zob Ahan	1-0	Shahin Bushehr	Foolad Shahr/Esfahan	Seyed Mohammad Hossaini 90+5'	Mohamad Ghazi, Mohamad Reza Khalatbari	-	2000	Saeed Mozaffari Zadeh	2
29	14-March-2010	Rah Ahan	0-0	Zob Ahan	Ekbatan/Tehran	-	Mohamad Ghazi, Ghasem Haddadifar	-	1000	Masoud Moradi	2
30	4-April–2010	Zob Ahan	2-2	Paykan	Foolad Shahr/Esfahan	Igor Castro 7', Mohsen Mosalman 52'	Sina Ashori, Mohsen Mosalman	-	4000	Shahin Hajbabaei	2
31	19-April–2010	Esteghlal	1-0	Zob Ahan	Azadi /Tehran	-	Igor Castro	-	40000	Mohsen Ghahremani	2
32	2-May–2010	Zob Ahan	2-0	Moghavemat	Foolad Shahr/Esfahan	Farsheed Talebi 18', Mohamad Reza Khalatbari 75'(P)	Sina Ashori, Shahabeddin Gordan, Mohamad Ali Ahmadi, Hassan Ashjari	-	2000	Hedayat Mombeini	2
33	6-May–2010	Foolad	1-1	Zob Ahan	Foolad /Ahvaz	Farsheed Talebi 78'	Mostafa Salehinejad, Hassan Ashjari, Farsheed Talebi	-	5000	Alireza Faghani	2
34	6-May–2010	Zob Ahan	3-0	Malavan	Foolad Shahr/Esfahan	Farsheed Talebi 30', Igor Castro 60', Mohamad Reza Khalatbari 67'(P)	-	-	3000	Masoud Moradi	2

=== Results by round ===
Round	1	2	3	4	5	6	7	8	9	10	11	12	13	14	15	16	17	18	19	20	21	22	23	24	25	26	27	28	29	30	31	32	33	34
Ground	H	A	H	A	H	A	H	A	H	H	A	H	A	H	A	H	A	A	H	A	H	A	H	A	H	A	A	H	A	H	A	H	A	H
Result	W	D	W	W	D	L	W	D	W	D	D	L	D	W	W	W	W	L	W	D	W	D	D	W	L	D	W	W	D	D	L	W	D	W
Position	1	2	1	1	2	4	3	3	3	3	3	4	4	3	3	2	2	2	2	2	2	2	2	2	2	2	2	2	2	2	2	2	2	2

Updated to match(es) played on 6 May 2010. Source: "Ipl".
A = Away; H = Home; W = Win; D = Draw; L = Loss

=== Results summary ===
Overall								Home						Away					
Pld	W	D	L	GF	GA	GD	Pts	W	D	L	GF	GA	GD	W	D	L	GF	GA	GD
34	16	13	5	48	29	+19	61	11	4	2	29	11	+18	5	9	3	19	18	+1

=== League standings ===
Pos	Team	Pld	W	D	L	GF	GA	GD	Pts	Qualification or relegation
1	Sepahan (C)	34	19	10	5	67	30	+37	67	Qualification for the 2011 AFC Champions League
2	Zob Ahan	34	16	13	5	48	29	+19	61	Qualification for the 2011 AFC Champions League
3	Esteghlal	34	16	11	7	49	32	+17	59	Qualification for the 2011 AFC Champions League
4	Persepolis	34	13	14	7	46	40	+6	53	Qualification for the 2011 AFC Champions League
5	Steel Azin	34	13	13	8	55	49	+6	52	

Updated to match(es) played on 01 SEP 2018. Source: IPL Stats, Soccerway
Rules for classification: 1) Points; 2) Goal difference; 3) Goals scored.
(C) Champions

=== Top scorers and assists ===
==== Goal scorers ====
11 Goals

- (Iran) Mohammad Reza Khalatbari

7 Goals

- (Iran) Seyed Mohammad Hosseini

6 Goals

- (Iran) Esmaeil Farhadi

5 Goals

- (Brazil) Igor Castro

4 Goals

- (Iran) Farshid Talebi

3 Goals

- (Iran) Ghasem Hadadifar
- (Iran) Mohammad Ghazi

2 Goals

- (Iran) Mohsen Mosalman

1 Goal

- (Iran) Sina Ashouri
- (Iran) Keivan Amraei
- (Iran) Mostafa Salehi Nejad
- (Iran) Mohammad Mansouri
- (Iran) Mohammad Salsali
- (Iran) Payam Sadeghian

==== Assists ====
8 Assists

- (Iran) Hassan Ashjari

7 Assists

- (Iran) Mohammad Mansouri

6 Assists

- (Iran) Esmaeil Farhadi

5 Assists

- (Iran) Mohammad Reza Khalatbari

2 Assists

- (Iran) Mohammad Ghazi

1 Assist

- (Iran) Seyed Mohammad Hosseini
- (Iran) Farshid Talebi
- (Iran) Ghasem Hadadifar
- (Iran) Mohsen Mosalman
- (Iran) Mostafa Salehi Nejad
- (Iran) Abbas Ghasemi
- (Brazil) Igor Castro

==== Cards ====
Player	Yellow card	Yellow card Red card	Red card
(Iran) Sina Ashouri	9	0	0
(Iran) Mohammad Reza Khalatbari	6	0	1
(Iran) Mohamad Ali Ahmadi	5	0	1
(Iran) Hassan Ashjari	6	0	0
(Iran) Ghasem Hadadifar	6	0	0
(Iran) Mostafa Salehi Nejad	5	0	0
(Iran) Mohammad Salsali	5	0	0
(Iran) Mohsen Mosalman	4	0	0
(Iran) Farshid Talebi	3	1	0
(Iran) Mohammad Ghazi	3	0	0
(Iran) Shahab Gordan	3	0	0
(Brazil) Igor Castro	2	0	0
(Iran) Keivan Amraei	1	0	0
(Iran) Alireza Hadadifar	1	0	0
(Iran) Seyed Mohammad Hosseini	1	0	0
(Iran) Mohammad Mansouri	1	0	0
(Iran) Jalal Omidian	1	0	0
(Iran) Babak Razi	1	0	0
Total cards	63	1	2

==== Matches played ====
28 Matches

- (Iran) Seyed Mohammad Hosseini

27 Matches

- (Iran) Hassan Ashjari
- (Iran) Shahab Gordan

26 Matches

- (Iran) Mohammad Salsali

== Hazfi Cup ==
=== Matches ===
Last updated 13 April 2010

Round	Date	Home	Score	Away	Venue	Goal	Yellow card	Red card	Fans	Ref
Third Round	8-February–2010	Saipa	1-3	Zob Ahan	Enghelab/Karaj	Mohammad Ghazi 30', 32', 44'	Reza Mahmoudi, Ghasem Hadadifar, Sina Ashouri	-	1,500	Saeed Mozaffari Zadeh
1/16	25-February–2010	Zob Ahan	2-0	Sanat Naft Abadan	Foolad Shahr/Esfahan	Mohammad Ghazi 100', Mohammad Reza Khalatbari 103'	-	Mostafa Salehi Nejad (55)	1,500	Mohsen Ghahremani
1/8	19-Mar-2010	Shahin Bushehr	1-3	Zob Ahan	Shahid Beheshti /Bushehr	Mohammad Mansouri 32'(P), Igor José Marigo de Castro|Igor Castro 34', Seyed Mohammad Hosseini 70'	Mohsen Mosalman, Mohammad Mansouri, Sina Ashouri	-	15,000	Khodadad Afsharian
1/4	8-April–2010	Zob Ahan	0(4)--0(3)	Steel Azin Tehran	Foolad Shahr/Esfahan	Penalties: Mohammad Reza Khalatbari (penalty missed) , Hassan Ashjari (penalty scored) , Ahmad Mohammadpour (penalty scored) , Seyed Mohammad Hosseini (penalty scored) , Mohsen Mosalman (penalty scored)	Mohammad Ghazi, Mohammad Reza Khalatbari	-	10,000	Mohsen Torki
Semi-Final	23-April–2010	Gostaresh Foolad Tabriz	2–0	Zob Ahan	Yadegar Emam/Tabriz	-	Mohamad Ali Ahmadi, Mohammad Reza Khalatbari, Sina Ashouri	-	20,000	Yadolah Jahanbazi

=== Statistics ===
==== Goalscorers ====
4 Goals

- (Iran) Mohammad Ghazi

1 Goal

- (Iran) Mohammad Reza Khalatbari
- (Iran) Mohammad Mansouri
- (Iran) Seyed Mohammad Hosseini
- (Brazil) Igor Castro

==== Goalassistants ====
2 Assists

- (Iran) Ghasem Hadadifar

1 Assist

- (Iran) Babak Razi
- (Iran) Mohammad Salsali
- (Iran) Mohammad Ghazi

==== Cards ====
Player	Yellow card	Yellow card Red card	Red card
(Iran) Sina Ashouri	3	0	0
(Iran) Mostafa Salehi Nejad	0	0	1
(Iran) Reza Mahmoudi	1	0	0
(Iran) Ghasem Hadadifar	1	0	0
(Iran) Mohsen Mosalman	1	0	0
(Iran) Mohammad Mansouri	1	0	0
(Iran) Mohammad Ghazi	1	0	0
(Iran) Mohammad Reza Khalatbari	1	0	0
(Iran) Mohamad Ali Ahmadi	1	0	0

== Asian Champions League ==
=== Group B ===
Pos	Team	Pld	W	D	L	GF	GA	GD	Pts	Qualification	ZOB	BUN	ITT	WAH
1	(Iran) Zob Ahan	6	4	1	1	8	3	+5	13	Advance to knockout stage	—	3–0	1–0	1–0
2	(Uzbekistan) Bunyodkor	6	3	1	2	10	7	+3	10	Advance to knockout stage	0–1	—	3–0	4–1
3	(Saudi Arabia) Al-Ittihad Jeddah	6	2	2	2	9	7	+2	8		2–2	1–1	—	4–0
4	(United Arab Emirates) Al-Wahda	6	1	0	5	3	13	−10	3		1–0	1–2	0–2	—

Source: AFC Champions League Official Page

=== Matches ===
==== Group stage ====
23 February 2010
17:30 (UTC+3:30)

Zob Ahan (Iran)	1–0	(United Arab Emirates) Al-Wahda
Igor 60'	Report

Foolad Shahr Stadium, Isfahan
Attendance: 4,568
Referee: (Japan) Minoru Tojo

9 March 2010
20:35 (UTC+3)

Al-Ittihad (Saudi Arabia)	2–2	(Iran) Zob Ahan
Ziaya 13'; Noor 41'	Report	Farhadi 50'; Ghazi 52'

Prince Abdullah al-Faisal Stadium, Jeddah
Attendance: 15,343
Referee: (Qatar) Abdulrahman Abdou

24 March 2010
18:00 (UTC+3:30)

Zob Ahan (Iran)	3–0	(Uzbekistan) Bunyodkor
Hosseini 38'; Ghazi 54'; Khalatbari 80'	Report

Foolad Shahr Stadium, Isfahan
Attendance: 5,250
Referee: (South Korea) Choi Myung Yong

30 March 2010
17:00 (UTC+5)

Bunyodkor (Uzbekistan)	0–1	(Iran) Zob Ahan
	Report	Khalatbari 30'

JAR Stadium, Tashkent
Attendance: 9,000
Referee: (China) Sun Baojie

14 April 2010
19:35 (UTC+4)

Al-Wahda (United Arab Emirates)	1–0	(Iran) Zob Ahan
Ameen 72'	Report

Al-Nahyan Stadium, Abu Dhabi
Attendance: 1,575
Referee: (Bahrain) Nawaf Abdulla

28 April 2010
18:30 (UTC+3:30)

Zob Ahan (Iran)	1–0	(Saudi Arabia) Al-Ittihad
Khalatbari 56'	Report

Foolad Shahr Stadium, Isfahan
Attendance: 5,961
Referee: (Australia) Peter Green

==== Round of 16 ====
12 May 2010
19:00 (UTC+4:30)

Zob Ahan (Iran)	1–0	(Iran) Mes Kerman
Igor 85'	Report

Foolad Shahr Stadium, Isfahan
Attendance: 6,700
Referee: (South Korea) Choi Myung-Yong

==== Quarter-finals ====
Team 1	Score	Team 2
Zob Ahan (Iran)		(South Korea) Pohang Steelers

15 September 2010
18:30 (UTC+4:30)

Zob Ahan (Iran)	v	(South Korea) Pohang Steelers

Foolad Shahr Stadium, Isfahan

22 September 2010
19:30 (UTC+9)

Pohang Steelers (South Korea)	v	(Iran) Zob Ahan

Steelyard Stadium, Pohang

=== Top scorers and assists ===
==== Goal scorers ====
3 Goals

- (Iran) Mohammad Reza Khalatbari

2 Goals

- (Iran) Mohammad Ghazi
- (Brazil) Igor Castro

1 Goal

- (Iran) Seyed Mohammad Hosseini
- (Iran) Esmaeil Farhadi

==== Assists ====
2 Assists

- (Iran) Hassan Ashjari

1 Assist

- (Iran) Farshid Talebi
- (Iran) Ghasem Hadadifar
- (Iran) Mohammad Ghazi

==== Cards ====
Player	Yellow card	Yellow card Red card	Red card
(Iran) Seyed Mohammad Hosseini	2	0	0
(Iran) Sina Ashouri	2	0	0
(Iran) Ghasem Hadadifar	2	0	0
(Iran) Farshid Talebi	2	0	0
(Iran) Mohammad Reza Khalatbari	2	0	0
(Iran) Mohamad Ali Ahmadi	1	0	0
(Iran) Mohammad Mansouri	1	0	0
Total cards	12	0	0
