= 2010 AFC Champions League =

29th edition of premier club football tournament organized by the AFC

Tournament details
- Dates: 30 January – 13 November 2010
- Teams: 37 (from 15 associations)

Final positions
- Champions: (South Korea) Seongnam Ilhwa Chunma (2nd title)
- Runners-up: (Iran) Zob Ahan

Tournament statistics
- Matches played: 117
- Goals scored: 339 (2.9 per match)
- Attendance: 1,390,376 (11,884 per match)
- Top scorer(s): José Mota (9 goals)
- Best player: Saša Ognenovski

The 2010 AFC Champions League was the 29th edition of the top-level Asian club football tournament organized by the Asian Football Confederation (AFC), and the 8th under the current AFC Champions League title. The final was held at the National Stadium in Tokyo on 13 November 2010. The winner, Seongnam Ilhwa Chunma, qualified for the 2010 FIFA Club World Cup in UAE.

== Qualification ==
The preliminary qualification scheme for the AFC 2010 was released in 2008. A total of 38 clubs were due to participate in the 2010 AFC Champions League (eventually reduced to 37).

=== AFC assessment ranking ===
West Asia
Pos	Member Association	Points (total 500)	Clubs	Spots		
Pos	Member Association	Points (total 500)	Clubs	Group stage	Play-off	AFC Cup
4	Saudi Arabia	365	12	4	0	0
5	(United Arab Emirates) UAE	356	12	3	1	0
7	Iran	340	18	4	0	0
9	Uzbekistan	289	16	2	0	1
10	Qatar	270	10	2	0	0
13	India	202	10	0	1	1

Meet the criteria
Do not meet the criteria

East Asia
Pos	Member Association	Points (total 500)	Clubs	Spots		
Pos	Member Association	Points (total 500)	Clubs	Group stage	Play-off	AFC Cup
1	Japan	470	18	4	0	0
2	(South Korea) Korea Republic	441	14	4	0	0
3	China PR	431	16	4	0	0
4	Australia	343	7+1^{†}	2	0	0
5	Indonesia	296	18	1	1	0
6	Singapore	279	12	0	1	1
7	Thailand	221	16	0	1	1
8	Vietnam	191	14	0	0	2

^{†} One of the A-League clubs, Wellington Phoenix, is based in New Zealand, an OFC member country, therefore not being eligible to compete in the ACL.

=== Allocation of entries ===
Qualifying play-off (8 teams)

- United Arab Emirates, Indonesia, Singapore, Thailand, India, Vietnam each have 1 team qualify
- 2009 AFC Cup finalists

However, Al Kuwait, the 2009 AFC Cup winners, were removed as their league did not meet the Champions League criteria.

Group stage (32 teams)

- 2 qualifying play-off winners
- 4 teams qualified: Iran, China PR, Japan, (South Korea) Korea Republic, Saudi Arabia
- 3 teams qualified: United Arab Emirates
- 2 teams qualified: Australia, Uzbekistan, Qatar
- 1 team qualified: Indonesia

== Teams ==
In the following table, the number of appearances and last appearance count only those since the 2002–03 season (including qualifying rounds), when the competition was rebranded as the AFC Champions League. TH means title holders.

West Asia (Groups A–D)
Team	Qualifying method	App*	Last App
(Iran) Esteghlal	2008–09 Persian Gulf Cup champions	3rd	2009
(Iran) Zob Ahan	2008–09 Persian Gulf Cup runners-up 2008–09 Hazfi Cup winners	2nd	2004
(Iran) Mes Kerman	2008–09 Persian Gulf Cup 3rd place	1st	none
(Iran) Sepahan	2008–09 Persian Gulf Cup 4th place	6th	2009
(Saudi Arabia) Al-Ittihad	2008–09 Saudi Professional League champions	6th	2009
(Saudi Arabia) Al-Shabab	2009 King Cup of Champions winners	5th	2009
(Saudi Arabia) Al-Hilal	2008–09 Saudi Professional League runners-up	6th	2009
(Saudi Arabia) Al-Ahli	2008–09 Saudi Professional League 3rd place	4th	2008
(United Arab Emirates) Al-Ahli	2008–09 UAE Pro-League champions	4th	2009
(United Arab Emirates) Al-Ain	2008–09 UAE Presidents Cup winners	6th	2007
(United Arab Emirates) Al-Jazira	2008–09 UAE Pro-League runners-up	2nd	2009
(Qatar) Al-Gharafa	2008–09 Qatar Stars League champions 2009 Emir of Qatar Cup winners	5th	2009
(Qatar) Al-Sadd	2008–09 Qatar Stars League runners-up	7th	2008
(Uzbekistan) Bunyodkor	2009 Uzbek League champions	3rd	2009
(Uzbekistan) Pakhtakor	2009 Uzbekistani Cup winners	8th	2009
Qualifying play-off participants
(India) Churchill Brothers	2008–09 I-League champions	2nd	2002–03
(Syria) Al-Karamah	2009 AFC Cup runners-up 2008–09 Syrian Premier League runners-up	4th	2008
(United Arab Emirates) Al-Wahda	2008–09 UAE Pro-League 4th place	5th	2008

East Asia (Groups E–H)
Team	Qualifying method	App*	Last App
(China) Beijing Guoan	2009 Chinese Super League champions	3rd	2009
(China) Changchun Yatai	2009 Chinese Super League runners-up	2nd	2008
(China) Henan Jianye	2009 Chinese Super League 3rd place	1st	none
(China) Shandong Luneng Taishan	2009 Chinese Super League 4th place	4th	2009
(Japan) Kashima Antlers	2009 J. League Division 1 champions	4th	2009
(Japan) Kawasaki Frontale	2009 J. League Division 1 runners-up	3rd	2009
(Japan) Gamba Osaka	2009 J. League Division 1 3rd place 2009–10 Emperor's Cup winners	4th	2009
(Japan) Sanfrecce Hiroshima	2009 J. League Division 1 4th place	1st	none
(South Korea) Pohang Steelers^{TH}	2009 AFC Champions League champions 2009 K-League 3rd place	3rd	2009
(South Korea) Jeonbuk Hyundai Motors	2009 K-League champions	4th	2007
(South Korea) Suwon Samsung Bluewings	2009 Korean FA Cup winners	3rd	2009
(South Korea) Seongnam Ilhwa Chunma	2009 K-League runners-up	4th	2007
(Australia) Melbourne Victory	2008–09 A-League premiers 2009 A-League Grand Final winners	2nd	2008
(Australia) Adelaide United	2008–09 A-League regular season runners-up	3rd	2008
(Indonesia) Persipura Jayapura	2008–09 Indonesia Super League champions	1st	none
Qualifying play-off participants
(Indonesia) Sriwijaya	2008–09 Copa Indonesia winners	2nd	2009
Singapore Armed Forces	2009 S.League champions	2nd	2009
(Thailand) Muangthong United	2009 Thai Premier League champions	1st	none
(Vietnam) Đà Nẵng	2009 V-League champions	2nd	2006

* Number of appearances (including qualifying rounds) since the 2002/03 season, when the competition was rebranded as the AFC Champions League

Location of the 2010 AFC Champions League group stage teams

== Schedule ==
The ACL 2010 schedule was released on 17 July 2009. It will have the same format as the 2009 AFC Champions League.

Date	Event
7 December	Draw for qualifying play-off, group stage, and round of 16
30 January	Qualifying play-off semi-finals
6 February	Qualifying play-off finals
23–24 February	Group stage Match Day 1
9–10 March	Group stage Match Day 2
23–24 March	Group stage Match Day 3
30–31 March	Group stage Match Day 4
13–14 April	Group stage Match Day 5

Date	Event
27–28 April	Group stage Match Day 6
11–12 May	Round of 16
25 May	Draw for remaining rounds
15 September	Quarter-finals 1st leg
22 September	Quarter-finals 2nd leg
6 October	Semi-finals 1st leg
20 October	Semi-finals 2nd leg
13 November	Final (National Stadium, Tokyo, Japan)

== Qualifying play-off ==
The teams have been divided into two zones. East has four teams while West has three after AFC Cup champions Kuwait SC's failure to fulfil the criteria set by AFC to compete in the play-offs. The draw for the qualifying play-off was held on 7 December 2009 in Kuala Lumpur, Malaysia. All losers from the qualifying play-off will enter the 2010 AFC Cup.

Team 1	Score	Team 2
West Asia Semi-final
Al-Karamah (Syria)	0–1	(United Arab Emirates) Al-Wahda
West Asia Final
Al-Wahda (United Arab Emirates)	5–2	(India) Churchill Brothers
East Asia Semi-finals
Singapore Armed Forces	3–0	(Indonesia) Sriwijaya
SHB Đà Nẵng (Vietnam)	0–3	(Thailand) Muangthong United
East Asia Final
Singapore Armed Forces	0–0 (aet)(4–3p)	(Thailand) Muangthong United

== Group stage ==
The draw for the group stage was held on 7 December 2009 in Kuala Lumpur, Malaysia.

Each club plays double round-robin (home and away) against fellow three group members, a total of 6 matches each. Clubs receive 3 points for a win, 1 point for a tie, 0 points for a loss. The clubs are ranked according to points and tie breakers are in following order:

1. Greater number of points obtained in the group matches between the teams concerned;
2. Goal difference resulting from the group matches between the teams concerned; (Away goals do not apply)
3. Greater number of goals scored in the group matches between the teams concerned; (Away goals do not apply)
4. Goal difference in all the group matches;
5. Greater number of goals scored in all the group matches;
6. Kicks from the penalty mark if only two teams are involved and they are both on the field of play;
7. Fewer score calculated according to the number of yellow and red cards received in the group matches; (1 point for each yellow card, 3 points for each red card as a consequence of two yellow cards, 3 points for each direct red card, 4 points for each yellow card followed by a direct red card)
8. Drawing of lots.

Winners and runners-up of each group will qualify for the next round.

=== Group A ===
Pos	Team	Pld	W	D	L	GF	GA	GD	Pts	Qualification	GHA	EST	AHL	JAZ
1	(Qatar) Al-Gharafa	6	4	1	1	11	9	+2	13	Advance to knockout stage	—	1–1	3–2	4–2
2	(Iran) Esteghlal	6	3	2	1	9	5	+4	11	Advance to knockout stage	3–0	—	2–1	0–0
3	(Saudi Arabia) Al-Ahli	6	2	0	4	11	9	+2	6		0–1	1–2	—	5–1
4	(United Arab Emirates) Al-Jazira	6	1	1	4	6	14	−8	4		1–2	2–1	0–2	—

Source: AFC Champions League Official Page

=== Group B ===
Pos	Team	Pld	W	D	L	GF	GA	GD	Pts	Qualification	ZOB	BUN	ITT	WAH
1	(Iran) Zob Ahan	6	4	1	1	8	3	+5	13	Advance to knockout stage	—	3–0	1–0	1–0
2	(Uzbekistan) Bunyodkor	6	3	1	2	10	7	+3	10	Advance to knockout stage	0–1	—	3–0	4–1
3	(Saudi Arabia) Al-Ittihad Jeddah	6	2	2	2	9	7	+2	8		2–2	1–1	—	4–0
4	(United Arab Emirates) Al-Wahda	6	1	0	5	3	13	−10	3		1–0	1–2	0–2	—

Source: AFC Champions League Official Page

=== Group C ===
Pos	Team	Pld	W	D	L	GF	GA	GD	Pts	Qualification	SHB	PAK	SEP	AIN
1	(Saudi Arabia) Al-Shabab	6	3	1	2	10	8	+2	10	Advance to knockout stage	—	2–1	1–1	3–2
2	(Uzbekistan) Pakhtakor	6	3	0	3	8	10	−2	9	Advance to knockout stage	1–3	—	2–1	3–2
3	(Iran) Sepahan	6	2	2	2	5	5	0	8		1–0	2–0	—	0–0
4	(United Arab Emirates) Al-Ain	6	2	1	3	8	8	0	7		2–1	0–1	2–0	—

Source: AFC Champions League Official Page

=== Group D ===
Pos	Team	Pld	W	D	L	GF	GA	GD	Pts	Qualification	HIL	MES	SAD	AHL
1	(Saudi Arabia) Al-Hilal	6	3	2	1	11	7	+4	11	Advance to knockout stage	—	3–1	0–0	1–1
2	(Iran) Mes Kerman	6	3	0	3	13	13	0	9	Advance to knockout stage	3–1	—	3–1	4–2
3	(Qatar) Al-Sadd	6	2	2	2	12	9	+3	8		0–3	4–1	—	2–2
4	(United Arab Emirates) Al-Ahli	6	1	2	3	9	16	−7	5		2–3	2–1	0–5	—

Source: AFC Champions League Official Page

=== Group E ===
Pos	Team	Pld	W	D	L	GF	GA	GD	Pts	Qualification	SEO	BEI	KAW	MEL
1	(South Korea) Seongnam Ilhwa Chunma	6	5	0	1	11	6	+5	15	Advance to knockout stage	—	3–1	2–0	3–2
2	(China) Beijing Guoan	6	3	1	2	7	5	+2	10	Advance to knockout stage	0–1	—	2–0	1–0
3	(Japan) Kawasaki Frontale	6	2	0	4	8	8	0	6		3–0	1–3	—	4–0
4	(Australia) Melbourne Victory	6	1	1	4	3	10	−7	4		0–2	0–0	1–0	—

Source: AFC Champions League Official Page

=== Group F ===
Pos	Team	Pld	W	D	L	GF	GA	GD	Pts	Qualification	KAS	JEO	CHA	JAY
1	(Japan) Kashima Antlers	6	6	0	0	14	3	+11	18	Advance to knockout stage	—	2–1	1–0	5–0
2	(South Korea) Jeonbuk Hyundai Motors	6	4	0	2	17	6	+11	12	Advance to knockout stage	1–2	—	1–0	8–0
3	(China) Changchun Yatai	6	1	0	5	10	7	+3	3		0–1	1–2	—	9–0
4	(Indonesia) Persipura Jayapura	6	1	0	5	4	29	−25	3		1–3	1–4	2–0	—

Source: AFC Champions League Official Page

=== Group G ===
Pos	Team	Pld	W	D	L	GF	GA	GD	Pts	Qualification	SUW	OSA	SAF	HEN
1	(South Korea) Suwon Samsung Bluewings	6	4	1	1	13	4	+9	13	Advance to knockout stage	—	0–0	6–2	2–0
2	(Japan) Gamba Osaka	6	3	3	0	11	5	+6	12	Advance to knockout stage	2–1	—	3–0	1–1
3	Singapore Armed Forces	6	1	1	4	6	16	−10	4		0–2	2–4	—	2–1
4	(China) Henan Jianye	6	0	3	3	3	8	−5	3		0–2	1–1	0–0	—

Source: AFC Champions League Official Page

=== Group H ===
Pos	Team	Pld	W	D	L	GF	GA	GD	Pts	Qualification	ADE	POH	HIR	SHA
1	(Australia) Adelaide United	6	3	1	2	6	4	+2	10	Advance to knockout stage	—	1–0	3–2	0–1
2	(South Korea) Pohang Steelers	6	3	1	2	8	7	+1	10	Advance to knockout stage	0–0	—	2–1	1–0
3	(Japan) Sanfrecce Hiroshima	6	3	0	3	11	11	0	9		1–0	4–3	—	0–1
4	(China) Shandong Luneng	6	2	0	4	5	8	−3	6		0–2	1–2	2–3	—

Source: AFC Champions League Official Page

== Knockout stage ==
=== Bracket ===
Round of 16
(Australia) Adelaide United	2
(South Korea) Jeonbuk Motors (a.e.t.)	3
(Saudi Arabia) Al-Shabab	3
(Iran) Esteghlal	2
(South Korea) Seongnam Ilhwa Chunma	3
(Japan) Gamba Osaka	0
(South Korea) Suwon Samsung Bluewings	2
(China) Beijing Guoan	0
(Iran) Zob Ahan	1
(Iran) Mes Kerman	0
(Japan) Kashima Antlers	0
(South Korea) Pohang Steelers	1
(Saudi Arabia) Al-Hilal	3
(Uzbekistan) Bunyodkor	0
(Qatar) Al-Gharafa	1
(Uzbekistan) Pakhtakor	0

Quarter-finals
(South Korea) Jeonbuk Hyundai Motors	0	1	1
(Saudi Arabia) Al-Shabab	2	0	2
(South Korea) Seongnam Ilhwa Chunma	4	0	4
(South Korea) Suwon Samsung Bluewings	1	2	3
(Iran) Zob Ahan	2	1	3
(South Korea) Pohang Steelers	1	1	2
(Saudi Arabia) Al-Hilal (a.e.t.)	3	2	5
(Qatar) Al-Gharafa	0	4	4

Semi-finals
(Saudi Arabia) Al-Shabab	4	0	4
(South Korea) Seongnam Ihwa (a)	3	1	4
(Iran) Zob Ahan	1	1	2
(Saudi Arabia) Al-Hilal	0	0	0

Final
(South Korea) Seongnam Ilhwa Chunma	3
(Iran) Zob Ahan	1

=== Round of 16 ===
The draw for the round of 16 was held on 7 December 2009, along with the draw for the qualifying play-off and group stage. The matches were played on 11 and 12 May 2010.

West Asia
Team 1	Score	Team 2
Al-Gharafa (Qatar)	1–0	(Uzbekistan) Pakhtakor
Al-Shabab (Saudi Arabia)	3–2	(Iran) Esteghlal
Zob Ahan (Iran)	1–0	(Iran) Mes Kerman
Al-Hilal (Saudi Arabia)	3–0	(Uzbekistan) Bunyodkor

East Asia
Team 1	Score	Team 2
Seongnam Ilhwa Chunma (South Korea)	3–0	(Japan) Gamba Osaka
Suwon Samsung Bluewings (South Korea)	2–0	(China) Beijing Guoan
Kashima Antlers (Japan)	0–1	(South Korea) Pohang Steelers
Adelaide United (Australia)	2–3 (aet)	(South Korea) Jeonbuk Hyundai Motors

=== Quarter-finals ===
The draw for the remaining rounds was held in Kuala Lumpur, Malaysia on 25 May 2010. Because of the country protection rule, if there are two clubs from the same country, they will not face each other in the quarter-finals. Therefore, the two clubs from Saudi Arabia may not be drawn with each other in the quarter-finals. However, the same rule does not apply if there are more than two clubs from the country. Therefore, the four clubs from the Korea Republic may be drawn with each other in the quarter-finals.

The first legs were played on 15 September, and the second legs were played on 22 September 2010.

Team 1	Agg.	Team 2	1st leg	2nd leg
Al-Hilal (Saudi Arabia)	5–4	(Qatar) Al-Gharafa	3–0	2–4 (aet)
Zob Ahan (Iran)	3–2	(South Korea) Pohang Steelers	2–1	1–1
Jeonbuk Hyundai Motors (South Korea)	1–2	(Saudi Arabia) Al-Shabab	0–2	1–0
Seongnam Ilhwa Chunma (South Korea)	4–3	(South Korea) Suwon Samsung Bluewings	4–1	0–2

=== Semi-finals ===
The first legs were played on 5 and 6 October, and the second legs were played on 20 October 2010.

Team 1	Agg.	Team 2	1st leg	2nd leg
Al-Shabab (Saudi Arabia)	4–4 (a)	(South Korea) Seongnam Ilhwa Chunma	4–3	0–1
Zob Ahan (Iran)	2–0	(Saudi Arabia) Al-Hilal	1–0	1–0

=== Final ===
The final was played on 13 November 2010. It was a one-leg match played at the National Stadium, Tokyo, Japan.

13 November 2010
19:00 (JST)

Seongnam Ilhwa Chunma (South Korea)	3 – 1	(Iran) Zob Ahan
Saša 29'; Cho Byung-Kuk 53'; Kim Chul-ho 83'	Report	Khalatbari 67'

National Olympic Stadium, Tokyo
Attendance: 27,308
Referee: Yuichi Nishimura (Japan)

== Top scorers ==
Note: Goals scored in qualifying round not counted.

Rank	Player	Club	MD1	MD2	MD3	MD4	MD5	MD6	R16	QF1	QF2	SF1	SF2	F	Total
1	(Brazil) José Mota	(South Korea) Suwon Samsung Bluewings		1	2	1	1	2	2						9
2	(Colombia) Mauricio Molina	(South Korea) Seongnam Ilhwa Chunma	1			1			2	1		2			7
3	(Brazil) Denilson	(Uzbekistan) FC Bunyodkor	1	2				2							5
3	(Iran) Mohammad Reza Khalatbari	(Iran) Zob Ahan			1	1		1			1			1	5
3	(Iran) Farhad Majidi	(Iran) Esteghlal	2		2			1							5
3	(Brazil) Leandro	(Qatar) Al-Sadd		3	2										5
3	(Angola) Flávio	(Saudi Arabia) Al-Shabab		2		2		1							5
3	(Brazil) Araújo	(Qatar) Al-Gharafa		1			3		1						5
3	(Brazil) Eninho	(South Korea) Jeonbuk Hyundai Motors		1			2		2						5
3	(Iran) Mehdi Rajabzadeh	(Iran) Mes Kerman / (Iran) Zob Ahan	2				1	1		1					5
3	(Saudi Arabia) Yasser Al-Qahtani	(Saudi Arabia) Al-Hilal	2	1		1					1				5
