= 2010 AFC Champions League qualifying play-off =

Championship qualifiers

Seven teams contested in the 2010 AFC Champions League qualifying play-off. The two winners advanced to the 2010 AFC Champions League group stage. The losers entered the 2010 AFC Cup group stage.

== Bracket ==
=== East Asia ===
Round 1
1	(Singapore) SAFFC	3
4	(Indonesia) Sriwijaya	0
3	(Vietnam) SHB Đà Nẵng	0
2	(Thailand) Muangthong United	3

Final
(Singapore) SAFFC (p)	0 (4)
(Thailand) Muangthong United	0 (3)

=== West Asia ===
Round 1
1	(Syria) Al-Karamah	0
4	(United Arab Emirates) Al-Wahda	1
3	(India) Churchill Brothers
2	(bye)	-

Final
(United Arab Emirates) Al-Wahda	5
(India) Churchill Brothers	2

== Matches ==
=== East Asia ===
==== Semi-final Round ====
30 January 2010
19:30 UTC+8

Singapore Armed Forces	3 – 0	(Indonesia) Sriwijaya
Akiyoshi 6'; Martinez 64' (pen.); Sahdan 89' (pen.)	Report

Jalan Besar Stadium, Singapore
Attendance: 2,057
Referee: Ben Williams (Australia)

31 January 2010
16:00 UTC+7

SHB Đà Nẵng (Vietnam)	0 – 3	(Thailand) Muangthong United
	Report	Wongsa 33'; Kouakou 45'; Kaewprom 81'

Chi Lăng Stadium, Da Nang
Attendance: 14,000
Referee: Subkhiddin Mohd Salleh (Malaysia)

==== Final Round ====
6 February 2010
19:30 UTC+8

Singapore Armed Forces	0 – 0 (a.e.t.)	(Thailand) Muangthong United
	Report
Penalties
Sahdan (penalty scored); Wilkinson (penalty scored); Sandberg (penalty scored); Bennett (penalty scored); Akiyoshi (penalty missed)	4 – 3	(penalty scored) Tamaphan; (penalty missed) Wongsa; (penalty scored) Winothai; (penalty scored) Zaizen; (penalty missed) Sansook

Jalan Besar Stadium, Singapore
Attendance: 2,809
Referee: Kim Dong-Jin (Korea Republic)

=== West Asia ===
==== Semi-final Round ====
30 January 2010
19:00 UTC+3

Al-Karamah (Syria)	0 – 1	(United Arab Emirates) Al-Wahda
	Report	Khamees 72'

Khaled bin Walid Stadium, Homs
Attendance: 30,000
Referee: Valentin Kovalenko (Uzbekistan)

==== Final Round ====
6 February 2010
19:00 UTC+4

Al-Wahda (United Arab Emirates)	5 – 2	(India) Churchill Brothers
Baiano 45', 65'; Khamees 46'; Jumaa 63'; Matar 85'	Report	Ito 41'; Singh 77'

Al-Nahyan Stadium, Abu Dhabi
Attendance: 3,000
Referee: Mohsen Torky (Iran)
