= Taisuke Akiyoshi =

Japanese footballer (born 1989)

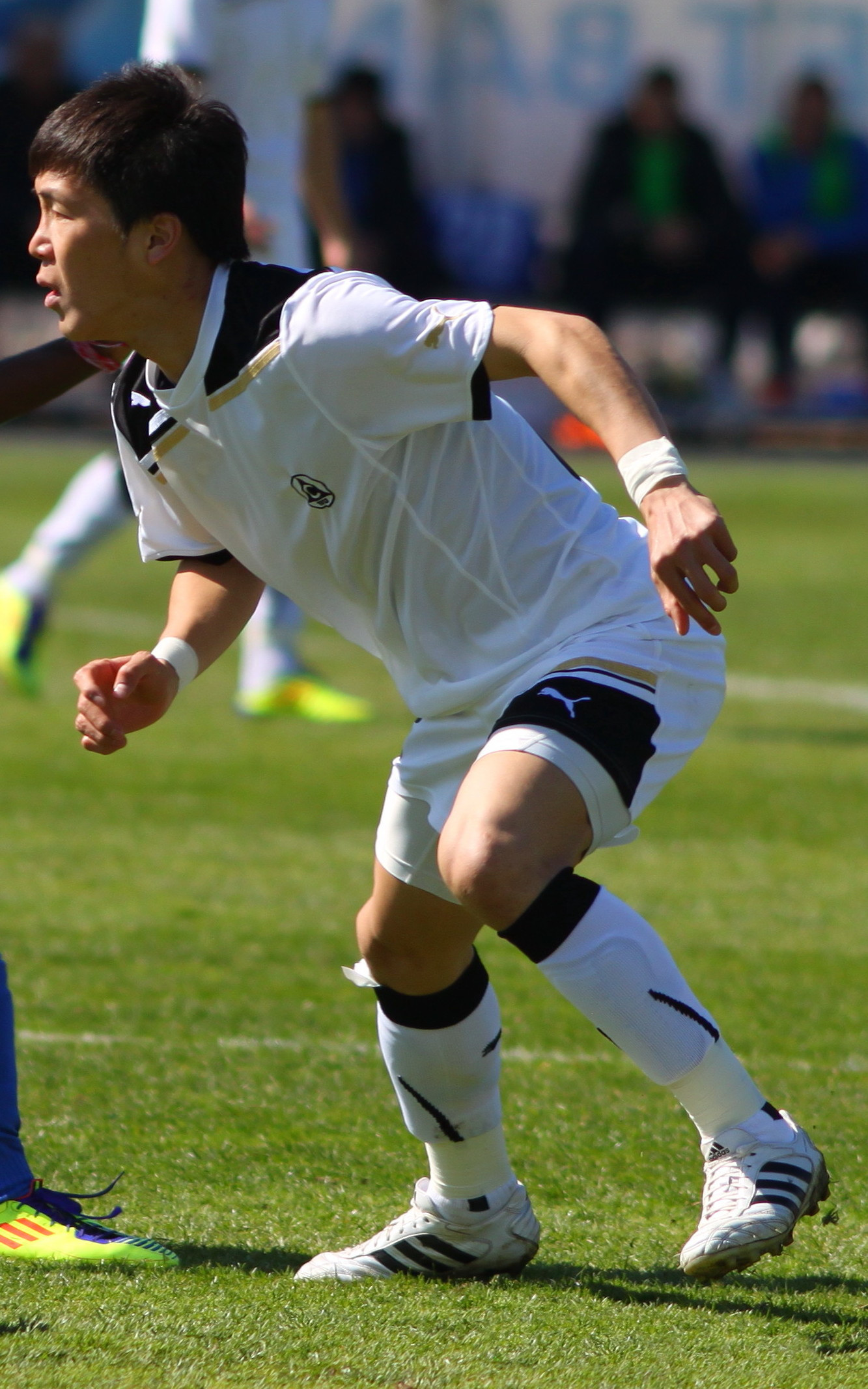

Personal information
- Full name: Taisuke Akiyoshi
- Date of birth: 18 April 1989 (age 37)
- Place of birth: Kumamoto, Japan
- Height: 1.74 m (5 ft 8 1/2 in)
- Position: Midfielder

Team information
- Current team: Vanraure Hachinohe
- Number: 44

Youth career
- 2000–2001: Blaze Kumamoto
- 2002–2004: Luther Gakuin Junior High School
- 2005–2007: Luther Gakuin High School

Senior career*
Years	Team	Apps	(Gls)
2008–2009	Albirex Niigata Singapore	28	(1)
2010–2011	Singapore Armed Forces	56	(6)
2012–2013	Slavia Sofia	23	(2)
2013–2014	Zvijezda Gradačac	11	(0)
2014–2015	Sturm Graz	2	(0)
2015–2016	Ventforet Kofu	0	(0)
2016	→ Fagiano Okayama (loan)	1	(0)
2017	ReinMeer Aomori	26	(3)
2018–	Vanraure Hachinohe		
- * Club domestic league appearances and goals as of 23 February 2018

Taisuke Akiyoshi (秋吉 泰佑) (born 18 April 1989 in Kumamoto) is a Japanese footballer who plays as a midfielder currently playing for Vanraure Hachinohe.

== Career ==
Akiyoshi was the captain of his school's soccer team at Luther Senior High School. After graduating from high school, he started his career with Albirex Niigata FC (Singapore) in 2008, playing for 2 seasons. He turned down the chance to train with the parent club Albirex Niigata in order to join Singapore Armed Forces FC in 2010. He played for the club in the 2010 AFC Champions League group stage.

In January 2012, Akiyoshi was reported to be on trial with Kazakhstan Premier League side FC Kaisar.

=== Slavia Sofia ===
On 18 February 2012, after a successful trial period, Akiyoshi signed a 2 1/2-year contract at Slavia Sofia, becoming the first ever Japanese to play in the Bulgarian A Professional Football Group. He made his league debut in a 2–1 win over Minyor Pernik on 11 March, coming on as a substitute for Yordan Yurukov. On 7 April, Akiyoshi scored his first competitive goal for Slavia, scoring the equaliser in a 2–1 away win over Kaliakra Kavarna.

== Club statistics ==
Updated to 23 February 2018.

Club performance			League		Cup		League Cup		Total	
Season	Club	League	Apps	Goals	Apps	Goals	Apps	Goals	Apps	Goals
Japan			League		Emperor's Cup		J. League Cup		Total	
2015	Ventforet Kofu	J1 League	0	0	1	1	–		1	1
2016	Fagiano Okayama	J2 League	1	0	2	2	–		3	2
2017	ReinMeer Aomori	JFL	26	3	–		–		1	1
Career total			27	3	3	3	–		30	6
