= 2010 AFC Champions League group stage =

Football tournament group stage

The 2010 AFC Champions League group stage matches took place between 23 February and 28 April 2010.

== Groups ==
=== Group A ===
Pos	Team	Pld	W	D	L	GF	GA	GD	Pts	Qualification	GHA	EST	AHL	JAZ
1	(Qatar) Al-Gharafa	6	4	1	1	11	9	+2	13	Advance to knockout stage	—	1–1	3–2	4–2
2	(Iran) Esteghlal	6	3	2	1	9	5	+4	11	Advance to knockout stage	3–0	—	2–1	0–0
3	(Saudi Arabia) Al-Ahli	6	2	0	4	11	9	+2	6		0–1	1–2	—	5–1
4	(United Arab Emirates) Al-Jazira	6	1	1	4	6	14	−8	4		1–2	2–1	0–2	—

Source: AFC Champions League Official Page
23 February 2010
19:15 (UTC+4)

Al-Jazira (United Arab Emirates)	1–2	(Qatar) Al-Gharafa
Rafael Sóbis 56'	Report	El Assas 17'; Younis Mahmoud 53'

Mohammed bin Zayed Stadium, Abu Dhabi
Attendance: 5,810
Referee: Yuichi Nishimura (Japan)
23 February 2010
20:20 (UTC+3)

Al-Ahli (Saudi Arabia)	1–2	(Iran) Esteghlal
Al-Raheb 85'	Report	Majidi 11', 75'

Prince Abdullah al-Faisal Stadium, Jeddah
Attendance: 16,000
Referee: Hiroyoshi Takayama (Japan)

9 March 2010
17:30 (UTC+3:30)

Esteghlal (Iran)	0–0	(United Arab Emirates) Al-Jazira
	Report

Azadi Stadium, Tehran
Attendance: 32,000
Referee: Choi Myung-Yong (Korea Republic)
9 March 2010
18:40 (UTC+3)

Al-Gharafa (Qatar)	3–2	(Saudi Arabia) Al-Ahli
Al-Zain 2'; S. Al-Shammari 79'; Araújo 81'	Report	Marcinho 45+1'; Jaizawi 64'

Al-Gharafa Stadium, Al Rayyan
Attendance: 6,091
Referee: Mohsen Basma (Syria)

23 March 2010
17:30 (UTC+4:30)

Esteghlal (Iran)	3–0	(Qatar) Al-Gharafa
Majidi 13', 53'; Montazeri 79'	Report

Azadi Stadium, Tehran
Attendance: 60,000
Referee: Valentin Kovalenko (Uzbekistan)
23 March 2010
20:30 (UTC+3)

Al-Ahli (Saudi Arabia)	5–1	(United Arab Emirates) Al-Jazira
Victor Simões 2'; Marcinho 55', 78'; Jaizawi 57', 90'	Report	Toni 62'

Prince Abdullah al-Faisal Stadium, Jeddah
Attendance: 11,000
Referee: Ravshan Irmatov (Uzbekistan)

31 March 2010
18:45 (UTC+3)

Al-Gharafa (Qatar)	1–1	(Iran) Esteghlal
Younis Mahmoud 45+3'	Report	Seyed-Salehi 59'

Al-Gharafa Stadium, Al Rayyan
Attendance: 6,023
Referee: Peter Green (Australia)
31 March 2010
19:30 (UTC+4)

Al-Jazira (United Arab Emirates)	0–2	(Saudi Arabia) Al-Ahli
	Report	Victor Simões 7', 50'

Mohammed bin Zayed Stadium, Abu Dhabi
Attendance: 2,006
Referee: Abdul Malik Bashir (Singapore)

14 April 2010
17:30 (UTC+4:30)

Esteghlal (Iran)	2–1	(Saudi Arabia) Al-Ahli
Seyed-Salehi 25'; Sadeghi 44'	Report	Victor Simões 36' (pen.)

Azadi Stadium, Tehran
Attendance: 64,840
Referee: Sun Baojie (China)
14 April 2010
19:00 (UTC+3)

Al-Gharafa (Qatar)	4–2	(United Arab Emirates) Al-Jazira
Araújo 11', 41', 46'; El Assas 65'	Report	A. Mousa 88'; Rafael Sóbis 74'

Al-Gharafa Stadium, Al Rayyan
Attendance: 5,432
Referee: Kim Dong-Jin (Korea Republic)

28 April 2010
19:45 (UTC+4)

Al-Jazira (United Arab Emirates)	2–1	(Iran) Esteghlal
Basheer 51'; Ahmed 53'	Report	Majidi 38'

Mohammed bin Zayed Stadium, Abu Dhabi
Attendance: 2,129
Referee: Minoru Tojo (Japan)
28 April 2010
20:40 (UTC+3)

Al-Ahli (Saudi Arabia)	0–1	(Qatar) Al-Gharafa
	Report	Kamel 90+2'

Prince Abdullah al-Faisal Stadium, Jeddah
Attendance: 500
Referee: Ben Williams (Australia)

=== Group B ===
Pos	Team	Pld	W	D	L	GF	GA	GD	Pts	Qualification	ZOB	BUN	ITT	WAH
1	(Iran) Zob Ahan	6	4	1	1	8	3	+5	13	Advance to knockout stage	—	3–0	1–0	1–0
2	(Uzbekistan) Bunyodkor	6	3	1	2	10	7	+3	10	Advance to knockout stage	0–1	—	3–0	4–1
3	(Saudi Arabia) Al-Ittihad Jeddah	6	2	2	2	9	7	+2	8		2–2	1–1	—	4–0
4	(United Arab Emirates) Al-Wahda	6	1	0	5	3	13	−10	3		1–0	1–2	0–2	—

Source: AFC Champions League Official Page
23 February 2010
16:00 (UTC+5)

Bunyodkor (Uzbekistan)	3–0	(Saudi Arabia) Al-Ittihad
Rivaldo 3'; Hasanov 21'; Denilson 66'	Report

JAR Stadium, Tashkent
Attendance: 7,500
Referee: Ben Williams (Australia)
23 February 2010
17:30 (UTC+3:30)

Zob Ahan (Iran)	1–0	(United Arab Emirates) Al-Wahda
Igor 60'	Report

Foolad Shahr Stadium, Isfahan
Attendance: 4,568
Referee: Minoru Tojo (Japan)

9 March 2010
19:20 (UTC+4)

Al-Wahda (United Arab Emirates)	1–2	(Uzbekistan) Bunyodkor
Al Kathiri 89'	Report	Denilson 37', 85'

Al-Nahyan Stadium, Abu Dhabi
Attendance: 5,000
Referee: Abdullah Balideh (Qatar)
9 March 2010
20:35 (UTC+3)

Al-Ittihad (Saudi Arabia)	2–2	(Iran) Zob Ahan
Ziaya 13'; Noor 41'	Report	Farhadi 50'; Ghazi 52'

Prince Abdullah al-Faisal Stadium, Jeddah
Attendance: 15,343
Referee: Abdulrahman Abdou (Qatar)

24 March 2010
18:00 (UTC+4:30)

Zob Ahan (Iran)	3–0	(Uzbekistan) Bunyodkor
Hosseini 38'; Ghazi 54'; Khalatbari 80'	Report

Foolad Shahr Stadium, Isfahan
Attendance: 5,250
Referee: Choi Myung Yong (Korea Republic)
24 March 2010
19:30 (UTC+4)

Al-Wahda (United Arab Emirates)	0–2	(Saudi Arabia) Al-Ittihad
	Report	Ziaya 17'; Noor 90'

Al-Nahyan Stadium, Abu Dhabi
Attendance: 8,553
Referee: Tan Hai (China)

30 March 2010
17:00 (UTC+5)

Bunyodkor (Uzbekistan)	0–1	(Iran) Zob Ahan
	Report	Khalatbari 30'

JAR Stadium, Tashkent
Attendance: 9,000
Referee: Sun Baojie (China)
30 March 2010
20:45 (UTC+3)

Al-Ittihad (Saudi Arabia)	4–0	(United Arab Emirates) Al-Wahda
Ziaya 11'; Kariri 16', 19'; Al-Nemri 32'	Report

Prince Abdullah al-Faisal Stadium, Jeddah
Attendance: 15,500
Referee: Chaiya Mahaprab (Thailand)

14 April 2010
19:35 (UTC+4)

Al-Wahda (United Arab Emirates)	1–0	(Iran) Zob Ahan
Ameen 72'	Report

Al-Nahyan Stadium, Abu Dhabi
Attendance: 1,575
Referee: Nawaf Shukralla (Bahrain)
14 April 2010
20:50 (UTC+3)

Al-Ittihad (Saudi Arabia)	1–1	(Uzbekistan) Bunyodkor
Noor 38' (pen.)	Report	Soliev 62'

Prince Abdullah al-Faisal Stadium, Jeddah
Attendance: 17,500
Referee: Yuichi Nishimura (Japan)

28 April 2010
18:00 (UTC+5)

Bunyodkor (Uzbekistan)	4–1	(United Arab Emirates) Al-Wahda
Rivaldo 28'; Denilson 31', 57'; Haydarov 79'	Report	Razzaq 90'

JAR Stadium, Tashkent
Attendance: 7,992
Referee: Kim Dong-Jin (Korea Republic)
28 April 2010
18:30 (UTC+4:30)

Zob Ahan (Iran)	1–0	(Saudi Arabia) Al-Ittihad
Khalatbari 56'	Report

Foolad Shahr Stadium, Isfahan
Attendance: 5,961
Referee: Peter Green (Australia)

=== Group C ===
Pos	Team	Pld	W	D	L	GF	GA	GD	Pts	Qualification	SHB	PAK	SEP	AIN
1	(Saudi Arabia) Al-Shabab	6	3	1	2	10	8	+2	10	Advance to knockout stage	—	2–1	1–1	3–2
2	(Uzbekistan) Pakhtakor	6	3	0	3	8	10	−2	9	Advance to knockout stage	1–3	—	2–1	3–2
3	(Iran) Sepahan	6	2	2	2	5	5	0	8		1–0	2–0	—	0–0
4	(United Arab Emirates) Al-Ain	6	2	1	3	8	8	0	7		2–1	0–1	2–0	—

Source: AFC Champions League Official Page
24 February 2010
19:20 (UTC+4)

Al-Ain (United Arab Emirates)	0–1	(Uzbekistan) Pakhtakor
	Report	Gevorkyan 60'

Sheikh Khalifa International Stadium, Al Ain
Attendance: 6,405
Referee: Sun Baojie (China)
24 February 2010
20:20 (UTC+3)

Al-Shabab (Saudi Arabia)	1–1	(Iran) Sepahan
Bin Sultan 69'	Report	Hosseini 14'

King Fahd International Stadium, Riyadh
Attendance: 7,000
Referee: Abdulrahman Abdou (Qatar)

10 March 2010
17:00 (UTC+5)

Pakhtakor (Uzbekistan)	1–3	(Saudi Arabia) Al-Shabab
Azizov 77'	Report	Flávio 61', 74'; Al-Kaabi 90+7'

Pakhtakor Markaziy Stadium, Tashkent
Attendance: 12,000
Referee: Minoru Tojo (Japan)
10 March 2010
17:00 (UTC+3:30)

Sepahan (Iran)	0–0	(United Arab Emirates) Al-Ain
	Report

Foolad Shahr Stadium, Isfahan
Attendance: 8,000
Referee: Abdul Malik Bashir (Singapore)

23 March 2010
17:00 (UTC+5)

Pakhtakor (Uzbekistan)	2–1	(Iran) Sepahan
Gevorkyan 38'; Geynrikh 71'	Report	Jamshidian 45+1'

Pakhtakor Markaziy Stadium, Tashkent
Attendance: 9,500
Referee: Mohsen Basma (Syria)
23 March 2010
19:30 (UTC+4)

Al-Ain (United Arab Emirates)	2–1	(Saudi Arabia) Al-Shabab
Emerson 14'; Sand 23'	Report	Bin Saran 45+1'

Sheikh Khalifa International Stadium, Al Ain
Attendance: 4,607
Referee: Kim Dong-Jin (Korea Republic)

31 March 2010
18:00 (UTC+4:30)

Sepahan (Iran)	2–0	(Uzbekistan) Pakhtakor
Touré 74'; Bengar 75'	Report

Foolad Shahr Stadium, Isfahan
Attendance: 9,570
Referee: Abdullah Balideh (Qatar)
31 March 2010
20:30 (UTC+3)

Al-Shabab (Saudi Arabia)	3–2	(United Arab Emirates) Al-Ain
Flávio 12', 66'; Camacho 83'	Report	Sand 31'; Neda 56' (o.g.)

King Fahd International Stadium, Riyadh
Attendance: 10,000
Referee: Mohsen Basma (Syria)

13 April 2010
18:00 (UTC+5)

Pakhtakor (Uzbekistan)	3–2	(United Arab Emirates) Al-Ain
Ahmedov 9', 12', 29'	Report	Valdivia 2'; Suyunov 20' (o.g.)

Pakhtakor Markaziy Stadium, Tashkent
Attendance: 14,600
Referee: Matthew Breeze (Australia)
13 April 2010
18:30 (UTC+4:30)

Sepahan (Iran)	1–0	(Saudi Arabia) Al-Shabab
Jamshidian 9'	Report

Foolad Shahr Stadium, Isfahan
Attendance: 9,500
Referee: Subkhiddin Mohd Salleh (Malaysia)

27 April 2010
19:50 (UTC+4)

Al-Ain (United Arab Emirates)	2–0	(Iran) Sepahan
Sand 43' (pen.), 71'	Report

Sheikh Khalifa International Stadium, Al Ain
Attendance: 1,543
Referee: Hiroyoshi Takayama (Japan)
27 April 2010
20:40 (UTC+3)

Al-Shabab (Saudi Arabia)	2–1	(Uzbekistan) Pakhtakor
Camacho 64' (pen.); Flávio 86'	Report	Karimov 31'

King Fahd International Stadium, Riyadh
Attendance: 7,251
Referee: Choi Myung-Yong (Korea Republic)

=== Group D ===
Pos	Team	Pld	W	D	L	GF	GA	GD	Pts	Qualification	HIL	MES	SAD	AHL
1	(Saudi Arabia) Al-Hilal	6	3	2	1	11	7	+4	11	Advance to knockout stage	—	3–1	0–0	1–1
2	(Iran) Mes Kerman	6	3	0	3	13	13	0	9	Advance to knockout stage	3–1	—	3–1	4–2
3	(Qatar) Al-Sadd	6	2	2	2	12	9	+3	8		0–3	4–1	—	2–2
4	(United Arab Emirates) Al-Ahli	6	1	2	3	9	16	−7	5		2–3	2–1	0–5	—

Source: AFC Champions League Official Page
24 February 2010
17:55 (UTC+3)

Al-Sadd (Qatar)	0–3	(Saudi Arabia) Al-Hilal
	Report	Al-Qahtani 9', 66'; Thiago Neves 90+3'

Jassim bin Hamad Stadium, Al Rayyan
Attendance: 11,100
Referee: Ravshan Irmatov (Uzbekistan)
24 February 2010
19:00 (UTC+3:30)

Mes Kerman (Iran)	4–2	(United Arab Emirates) Al-Ahli
Seifi 20'; Rajabzadeh 75', 85'; Samereh 90+3'	Report	Khamis 45+2'; Madanchi 57'

Kerman Municipal Stadium, Kerman
Attendance: 10,000
Referee: Valentin Kovalenko (Uzbekistan)

10 March 2010
19:15 (UTC+4)

Al-Ahli (United Arab Emirates)	0–5	(Qatar) Al-Sadd
	Report	Afif 36'; Leandro 44', 45+2', 76'; Ahmed 64'

Al-Rashid Stadium, Dubai
Attendance: 1,351
Referee: Kim Dong-Jin (Korea Republic)
10 March 2010
20:25 (UTC+3)

Al-Hilal (Saudi Arabia)	3–1	(Iran) Mes Kerman
Wilhelmsson 3'; Hawsawi 15'; Al-Qahtani 81'	Report	Samereh 90+3'

King Fahd International Stadium, Riyadh
Attendance: 22,000
Referee: Tan Hai (China)

24 March 2010
18:10 (UTC+3)

Al-Sadd (Qatar)	4–1	(Iran) Mes Kerman
Leandro 46', 49'; Felipe 53'; Al-Bloushi 60'	Report	Edinho 21'

Jassim bin Hamad Stadium, Al Rayyan
Attendance: 5,672
Referee: Hiroyoshi Takayama (Japan)
24 March 2010
20:30 (UTC+3)

Al-Hilal (Saudi Arabia)	1–1	(United Arab Emirates) Al-Ahli
Al-Mehyani 48'	Report	Abd Rabo 90+1'

King Fahd International Stadium, Riyadh
Attendance: 12,000
Referee: Nawaf Shukralla (Bahrain)

30 March 2010
18:00 (UTC+4:30)

Mes Kerman (Iran)	3–1	(Qatar) Al-Sadd
Edinho 37'; Samereh 48'; Zaltron 83'	Report	Ibrahim 7'

Kerman Municipal Stadium, Kerman
Attendance: 9,000
Referee: Ben Williams (Australia)
30 March 2010
19:25 (UTC+4)

Al-Ahli (United Arab Emirates)	2–3	(Saudi Arabia) Al-Hilal
A. Khalil 43'; César 65'	Report	Al-Qahtani 10'; Wilhelmsson 15'; Lee Young-Pyo 90+2'

Al-Rashid Stadium, Dubai
Attendance: 4,000
Referee: Yuichi Nishimura (Japan)

13 April 2010
19:35 (UTC+4)

Al-Ahli (United Arab Emirates)	2–1	(Iran) Mes Kerman
Hosseinkhani 30' (o.g.); A. Khalil 83' (pen.)	Report	Rajabzadeh 75'

Al-Rashid Stadium, Dubai
Attendance: 1,223
Referee: Mohsen Basma (Syria)
13 April 2010
20:35 (UTC+3)

Al-Hilal (Saudi Arabia)	0–0	(Qatar) Al-Sadd
	Report

King Fahd International Stadium, Riyadh
Attendance: 17,000
Referee: Abdullah Al-Hilali (Oman)

27 April 2010
18:00 (UTC+4:30)

Mes Kerman (Iran)	3–1	(Saudi Arabia) Al-Hilal
Edinho 1'; Zaltron 76'; Rajabzadeh 90+2'	Report	Al-Mehyani 51'

Kerman Municipal Stadium, Kerman
Attendance: 11,100
Referee: Masaaki Toma (Japan)
27 April 2010
18:25 (UTC+3)

Al-Sadd (Qatar)	2–2	(United Arab Emirates) Al-Ahli
Felipe 16'; Al-Bloushi 20'	Report	Baré 14'; Abbas 90+3'

Jassim bin Hamad Stadium, Al Rayyan
Attendance: 5,100
Referee: Chaiya Mahaprab (Thailand)

=== Group E ===
Pos	Team	Pld	W	D	L	GF	GA	GD	Pts	Qualification	SEO	BEI	KAW	MEL
1	(South Korea) Seongnam Ilhwa Chunma	6	5	0	1	11	6	+5	15	Advance to knockout stage	—	3–1	2–0	3–2
2	(China) Beijing Guoan	6	3	1	2	7	5	+2	10	Advance to knockout stage	0–1	—	2–0	1–0
3	(Japan) Kawasaki Frontale	6	2	0	4	8	8	0	6		3–0	1–3	—	4–0
4	(Australia) Melbourne Victory	6	1	1	4	3	10	−7	4		0–2	0–0	1–0	—

Source: AFC Champions League Official Page
23 February 2010
19:00 (UTC+9)

Seongnam Ilhwa Chunma (South Korea)	2–0	(Japan) Kawasaki Frontale
Molina 35'; Radončić 78'	Report

Tancheon Sports Complex, Seongnam
Attendance: 4,983
Referee: Subkhiddin Mohd Salleh (Malaysia)
23 February 2010
19:30 (UTC+8)

Beijing Guoan (China)	1–0	(Australia) Melbourne Victory
J. Griffiths 52'	Report

Workers Stadium, Beijing
Attendance: 31,000
Referee: Ali Hamad Al-Badwawi (UAE)

9 March 2010
19:30 (UTC+11)

Melbourne Victory (Australia)	0–2	(South Korea) Seongnam Ilhwa Chunma
	Report	Ognenovski 40'; Yun Young-Sun 85'

Etihad Stadium, Melbourne
Attendance: 7,899
Referee: Nawaf Shukralla (Bahrain)
9 March 2010
19:00 (UTC+9)

Kawasaki Frontale (Japan)	1–3	(China) Beijing Guoan
Kikuchi 39'	Report	J. Griffiths 37'; Wang Changqing 65', 86'

Todoroki Athletics Stadium, Kawasaki
Attendance: 6,606
Referee: Saeid Mozaffarizadeh (Iran)

23 March 2010
19:00 (UTC+9)

Seongnam Ilhwa Chunma (South Korea)	3–1	(China) Beijing Guoan
Song Ho-Young 80'; Radončić 87'; Jo Jae-Cheol 90'	Report	Ross 18'

Tancheon Sports Complex, Seongnam
Attendance: 1,224
Referee: Masoud Moradi (Iran)
23 March 2010
19:00 (UTC+9)

Kawasaki Frontale (Japan)	4–0	(Australia) Melbourne Victory
Jong Tae-Se 3'; Kurotsu 11'; Renatinho 22'; Taniguchi 90'	Report

Todoroki Athletics Stadium, Kawasaki
Attendance: 9,728
Referee: Khalil Al-Ghamdi (Saudi Arabia)

31 March 2010
19:30 (UTC+8)

Beijing Guoan (China)	0–1	(South Korea) Seongnam Ilhwa Chunma
	Report	Molina 73'

Workers Stadium, Beijing
Attendance: 31,200
Referee: Khalil Al-Ghamdi (Saudi Arabia)
31 March 2010
19:30 (UTC+11)

Melbourne Victory (Australia)	1–0	(Japan) Kawasaki Frontale
Muscat 60' (pen.)	Report

Etihad Stadium, Melbourne
Attendance: 6,011
Referee: Saeid Mozaffarizadeh (Iran)

14 April 2010
19:00 (UTC+9)

Kawasaki Frontale (Japan)	3–0	(South Korea) Seongnam Ilhwa Chunma
Taniguchi 4'; Tasaka 21'; Renatinho 69' (pen.)	Report

Todoroki Athletics Stadium, Kawasaki
Attendance: 10,403
Referee: Abdulrahman Abdou (Qatar)
14 April 2010
19:30 (UTC+10)

Melbourne Victory (Australia)	0–0	(China) Beijing Guoan
	Report

Etihad Stadium, Melbourne
Attendance: 6,394
Referee: Abdul Malik Bashir (Singapore)

28 April 2010
19:00 (UTC+9)

Seongnam Ilhwa Chunma (South Korea)	3–2	(Australia) Melbourne Victory
Jeon Kwang-Jin 27'; Namgung Do 72'; Jo Jae-Cheol 83'	Report	Dugandžić 46'; Pondeljak 77'

Tancheon Sports Complex, Seongnam
Attendance: 502
Referee: Mohamed Al Zarouni (UAE)
28 April 2010
19:30 (UTC+8)

Beijing Guoan (China)	2–0	(Japan) Kawasaki Frontale
J. Griffiths 26'; Valdo 47'	Report

Workers Stadium, Beijing
Attendance: 42,690
Referee: Valentin Kovalenko (Uzbekistan)

=== Group F ===
Pos	Team	Pld	W	D	L	GF	GA	GD	Pts	Qualification	KAS	JEO	CHA	JAY
1	(Japan) Kashima Antlers	6	6	0	0	14	3	+11	18	Advance to knockout stage	—	2–1	1–0	5–0
2	(South Korea) Jeonbuk Hyundai Motors	6	4	0	2	17	6	+11	12	Advance to knockout stage	1–2	—	1–0	8–0
3	(China) Changchun Yatai	6	1	0	5	10	7	+3	3		0–1	1–2	—	9–0
4	(Indonesia) Persipura Jayapura	6	1	0	5	4	29	−25	3		1–3	1–4	2–0	—

Source: AFC Champions League Official Page
23 February 2010
19:00 (UTC+7)

Persipura Jayapura (Indonesia)	1–4	(South Korea) Jeonbuk Hyundai Motors
Pae 68'	Report	Kim Seung-Yong 17' (pen.); Lovrek 26', 67', 82'

Gelora Bung Karno Stadium, Jakarta
Attendance: 7,534
Referee: Abdul Malik Bashir (Singapore)
23 February 2010
19:00 (UTC+9)

Kashima Antlers (Japan)	1–0	(China) Changchun Yatai
Nakata 42'	Report

Kashima Soccer Stadium, Kashima
Attendance: 5,757
Referee: Masoud Moradi (Iran)

9 March 2010
14:30 (UTC+8)

Changchun Yatai (China)	9–0	(Indonesia) Persipura Jayapura
Gao Jian 23', 34', 57'; Lambert 45', 52', 59'; Liu Weidong 65', 90+1'; Wang Bo 84'	Report

Changchun City Stadium, Changchun
Attendance: 15,000
Referee: Chaiya Mahaprab (Thailand)
9 March 2010
19:00 (UTC+9)

Jeonbuk Hyundai Motors (South Korea)	1–2	(Japan) Kashima Antlers
Eninho 42'	Report	Nakata 70'; Yasushi Endo 90'

Jeonju World Cup Stadium, Jeonju
Attendance: 3,800
Referee: Valentin Kovalenko (Uzbekistan)

24 March 2010
14:30 (UTC+8)

Changchun Yatai (China)	1–2	(South Korea) Jeonbuk Hyundai Motors
Du Zhenyu 64'	Report	Choi Tae-Uk 74'; Lee Dong-Gook 86'

Changchun City Stadium, Changchun
Attendance: 18,000
Referee: Abdullah Al-Hilali (Oman)
24 March 2010
19:00 (UTC+9)

Kashima Antlers (Japan)	5–0	(Indonesia) Persipura Jayapura
Araiba 39'; Marquinhos 45', 76'; Ogasawara 66' (pen.); Osako 68'	Report

Kashima Soccer Stadium, Kashima
Attendance: 4,708
Referee: Mohamed Al Zarouni (UAE)

30 March 2010
19:00 (UTC+7)

Persipura Jayapura (Indonesia)	1–3	(Japan) Kashima Antlers
Pae 19'	Report	Yasushi Endo 2'; Koroki 26'; Uchida 34'

Gelora Bung Karno Stadium, Jakarta
Attendance: 732
Referee: Nawaf Shukralla (Bahrain)
30 March 2010
19:00 (UTC+9)

Jeonbuk Hyundai Motors (South Korea)	1–0	(China) Changchun Yatai
Lee Dong-Gook 54'	Report

Jeonju World Cup Stadium, Jeonju
Attendance: 5,860
Referee: Mohsen Torky (Iran)

14 April 2010
14:30 (UTC+8)

Changchun Yatai (China)	0–1	(Japan) Kashima Antlers
	Report	Koroki 37'

Changchun City Stadium, Changchun
Attendance: 6,000
Referee: Ali Hamad Al-Badwawi (UAE)
14 April 2010
19:00 (UTC+9)

Jeonbuk Hyundai Motors (South Korea)	8–0	(Indonesia) Persipura Jayapura
Eninho 12', 56'; Sim Woo-Yeon 30', 80', 85'; Lee Dong-Gook 40' (pen.); Seo Jung-Jin 59'; Lim Sang-Hyub 81'	Report

Jeonju World Cup Stadium, Jeonju
Attendance: 1,862
Referee: Abdullah Balideh (Qatar)

28 April 2010
19:00 (UTC+7)

Persipura Jayapura (Indonesia)	2–0	(China) Changchun Yatai
Ivakdalam 26'; Pae 66'	Report

Gelora Bung Karno Stadium, Jakarta
Attendance: 500
Referee: Tayeb Hasan Shamsuzzaman (Bangladesh)
28 April 2010
19:00 (UTC+9)

Kashima Antlers (Japan)	2–1	(South Korea) Jeonbuk Hyundai Motors
Lee Jung-Soo 20'; Nozawa 22'	Report	Jin Kyung-Sun 77'

Kashima Soccer Stadium, Kashima
Attendance: 6,490
Referee: Masoud Moradi (Iran)

=== Group G ===
Pos	Team	Pld	W	D	L	GF	GA	GD	Pts	Qualification	SUW	OSA	SAF	HEN
1	(South Korea) Suwon Samsung Bluewings	6	4	1	1	13	4	+9	13	Advance to knockout stage	—	0–0	6–2	2–0
2	(Japan) Gamba Osaka	6	3	3	0	11	5	+6	12	Advance to knockout stage	2–1	—	3–0	1–1
3	Singapore Armed Forces	6	1	1	4	6	16	−10	4		0–2	2–4	—	2–1
4	(China) Henan Jianye	6	0	3	3	3	8	−5	3		0–2	1–1	0–0	—

Source: AFC Champions League Official Page
24 February 2010
19:30 (UTC+9)

Suwon Samsung Bluewings (South Korea)	0–0	(Japan) Gamba Osaka
	Report

Suwon World Cup Stadium, Suwon
Attendance: 17,264
Referee: Matthew Breeze (Australia)
24 February 2010
20:00 (UTC+8)

Henan Jianye (China)	0–0	Singapore Armed Forces
	Report

Zhengzhou Hanghai Stadium, Zhengzhou
Attendance: 20,893
Referee: Mohsen Torky (Iran)

10 March 2010
19:00 (UTC+9)

Gamba Osaka (Japan)	1–1	(China) Henan Jianye
Lucas 35' (pen.)	Report	Zhang Lu 3'

Osaka Expo '70 Stadium, Suita
Attendance: 7,598
Referee: Ali Hamad Al-Badwawi (UAE)
10 March 2010
19:30 (UTC+8)

Singapore Armed Forces	0–2	(South Korea) Suwon Samsung Bluewings
	Report	Juninho 45+1'; José Mota 73'

Jalan Besar Stadium, Singapore
Attendance: 2,674
Referee: Mohamed Al Zarouni (UAE)

23 March 2010
19:30 (UTC+8)

Singapore Armed Forces	2–4	(Japan) Gamba Osaka
Gunawan 32'; Sandberg 53'	Report	Hirai 6', 46', 83'; Nakazawa 71'

Jalan Besar Stadium, Singapore
Attendance: 3,226
Referee: Abdulrahman Abdou (Qatar)
23 March 2010
20:00 (UTC+8)

Henan Jianye (China)	0–2	(South Korea) Suwon Samsung Bluewings
	Report	José Mota 47', 61'

Zhengzhou Hanghai Stadium, Zhengzhou
Attendance: 20,666
Referee: Tayeb Hasan Shamsuzzaman (Bangladesh)

31 March 2010
19:00 (UTC+9)

Gamba Osaka (Japan)	3–0	Singapore Armed Forces
M. Yasuda 27'; Hirai 55'; Zé Carlos 90+2'	Report

Osaka Expo '70 Stadium, Suita
Attendance: 7,526
Referee: Valentin Kovalenko (Uzbekistan)
31 March 2010
19:30 (UTC+9)

Suwon Samsung Bluewings (South Korea)	2–0	(China) Henan Jianye
José Mota 10'; Kim Dae-Eui 90'	Report

Suwon World Cup Stadium, Suwon
Attendance: 11,456
Referee: Ravshan Irmatov (Uzbekistan)

13 April 2010
19:00 (UTC+9)

Gamba Osaka (Japan)	2–1	(South Korea) Suwon Samsung Bluewings
Futagawa 61'; Usami 90'	Report	José Mota 58'

Osaka Expo '70 Stadium, Suita
Attendance: 12,311
Referee: Masoud Moradi (Iran)
13 April 2010
19:30 (UTC+8)

Singapore Armed Forces	2–1	(China) Henan Jianye
Bennett 65'; Gunawan 77'	Report	Yu Le 71'

Jalan Besar Stadium, Singapore
Attendance: 2,278
Referee: Ben Williams (Australia)

27 April 2010
19:30 (UTC+9)

Suwon Samsung Bluewings (South Korea)	6–2	Singapore Armed Forces
José Mota 11', 38'; Lee Hyun-Jin 13'; Kwak Hee-Joo 28'; Yeom Ki-Hun 46', 90'	Report	Martinez 5'; Lovric 70'

Suwon World Cup Stadium, Suwon
Attendance: 2,963
Referee: Mohsen Basma (Syria)
27 April 2010
20:00 (UTC+8)

Henan Jianye (China)	1–1	(Japan) Gamba Osaka
Song Tae-Lim 90'	Report	Usami 39'

Zhengzhou Hanghai Stadium, Zhengzhou
Attendance: 17,645
Referee: Abdullah Balideh (Qatar)

=== Group H ===
Pos	Team	Pld	W	D	L	GF	GA	GD	Pts	Qualification	ADE	POH	HIR	SHA
1	(Australia) Adelaide United	6	3	1	2	6	4	+2	10	Advance to knockout stage	—	1–0	3–2	0–1
2	(South Korea) Pohang Steelers	6	3	1	2	8	7	+1	10	Advance to knockout stage	0–0	—	2–1	1–0
3	(Japan) Sanfrecce Hiroshima	6	3	0	3	11	11	0	9		1–0	4–3	—	0–1
4	(China) Shandong Luneng	6	2	0	4	5	8	−3	6		0–2	1–2	2–3	—

Source: AFC Champions League Official Page
24 February 2010
19:00 (UTC+9)

Sanfrecce Hiroshima (Japan)	0–1	(China) Shandong Luneng
	Report	Han Peng 77'

Hiroshima Big Arch, Hiroshima
Attendance: 11,955
Referee: Abdullah Balideh (Qatar)
24 February 2010
19:30 (UTC+10:30)

Adelaide United (Australia)	1–0	(South Korea) Pohang Steelers
Leckie 45+1'	Report

Hindmarsh Stadium, Adelaide
Attendance: 8,374
Referee: Mohsen Basma (Syria)

10 March 2010
15:30 (UTC+8)

Shandong Luneng (China)	0–2	(Australia) Adelaide United
	Report	van Dijk 27'; Leckie 70'

Shandong Stadium, Jinan
Attendance: 22,176
Referee: Alireza Faghani (Iran)
10 March 2010
19:30 (UTC+9)

Pohang Steelers (South Korea)	2–1	(Japan) Sanfrecce Hiroshima
Hwang Jae-Won 54'; Almir 90+2'	Report	Stoyanov 89'

Steelyard Stadium, Pohang
Attendance: 10,293
Referee: Mohsen Torky (Iran)

24 March 2010
19:30 (UTC+10:30)

Adelaide United (Australia)	3–2	(Japan) Sanfrecce Hiroshima
Dodd 12'; Cornthwaite 79'; Cássio 82'	Report	Kazuyuki Morisaki 55'; Takayanagi 76'

Hindmarsh Stadium, Adelaide
Attendance: 12,841
Referee: Subkhiddin Mohd Salleh (Malaysia)
24 March 2010
19:30 (UTC+9)

Pohang Steelers (South Korea)	1–0	(China) Shandong Luneng
No Byung-Jun 7'	Report

Steelyard Stadium, Pohang
Attendance: 10,128
Referee: Ali Hamad Al-Badwawi (UAE)

30 March 2010
19:00 (UTC+9)

Sanfrecce Hiroshima (Japan)	1–0	(Australia) Adelaide United
Satō 45'	Report

Hiroshima Big Arch, Hiroshima
Attendance: 12,094
Referee: Ali Hamad Al-Badwawi (UAE)
30 March 2010
19:30 (UTC+8)

Shandong Luneng (China)	1–2	(South Korea) Pohang Steelers
Li Jinyu 74'	Report	Kim Jae-Sung 51'; Kim Tae-Su 86'

Shandong Stadium, Jinan
Attendance: 11,810
Referee: Subkhiddin Mohd Salleh (Malaysia)

13 April 2010
19:30 (UTC+8)

Shandong Luneng (China)	2–3	(Japan) Sanfrecce Hiroshima
Han Peng 45'; Benson 85'	Report	Koji Morisaki 73'; T. Lee 78', 90+1'

Shandong Stadium, Jinan
Attendance: 8,876
Referee: Khalil Al-Ghamdi (Saudi Arabia)
13 April 2010
19:30 (UTC+9)

Pohang Steelers (South Korea)	0–0	(Australia) Adelaide United
	Report

Steelyard Stadium, Pohang
Attendance: 8,217
Referee: Ravshan Irmatov (Uzbekistan)

27 April 2010
19:00 (UTC+9)

Sanfrecce Hiroshima (Japan)	4–3	(South Korea) Pohang Steelers
Osaki 1'; T. Lee 31'; Kuwada 43'; Makino 81'	Report	Kim Jae-Sung 4', 48'; Shin Hyung-Min 63'

Hiroshima Big Arch, Hiroshima
Attendance: 5,612
Referee: Abdullah Al-Hilali (Oman)
27 April 2010
19:30 (UTC+9:30)

Adelaide United (Australia)	0–1	(China) Shandong Luneng
	Report	Li Wei 53'

Hindmarsh Stadium, Adelaide
Attendance: 10,313
Referee: Nawaf Shukralla (Bahrain)
