= 2010 AFC Champions League knockout stage =

Football tournament knockout stage

== Bracket ==
Note: while the bracket below shows the entire knockout stage, the draw for the round of 16 matches was determined at the time of the group draw, and kept teams from East and West Asia completely separate for that round.

The draw for the quarter-finals and beyond was held separately, after the conclusion of the round of 16. Because of the country protection rule, if there are two clubs from the same country, they will not face each other in the quarter-finals. Therefore, the two clubs from Saudi Arabia may not be drawn with each other in the quarter-finals. However, the same rule does not apply if there are more than two clubs from the country. Therefore, the four clubs from the Korea Republic may be drawn against each other in the quarter-finals.

Round of 16
(Australia) Adelaide United	2
(South Korea) Jeonbuk Motors (a.e.t.)	3
(Saudi Arabia) Al-Shabab	3
(Iran) Esteghlal	2
(South Korea) Seongnam Ilhwa Chunma	3
(Japan) Gamba Osaka	0
(South Korea) Suwon Samsung Bluewings	2
(China) Beijing Guoan	0
(Iran) Zob Ahan	1
(Iran) Mes Kerman	0
(Japan) Kashima Antlers	0
(South Korea) Pohang Steelers	1
(Saudi Arabia) Al-Hilal	3
(Uzbekistan) Bunyodkor	0
(Qatar) Al-Gharafa	1
(Uzbekistan) Pakhtakor	0

Quarter-finals
(South Korea) Jeonbuk Hyundai Motors	0	1	1
(Saudi Arabia) Al-Shabab	2	0	2
(South Korea) Seongnam Ilhwa Chunma	4	0	4
(South Korea) Suwon Samsung Bluewings	1	2	3
(Iran) Zob Ahan	2	1	3
(South Korea) Pohang Steelers	1	1	2
(Saudi Arabia) Al-Hilal (a.e.t.)	3	2	5
(Qatar) Al-Gharafa	0	4	4

Semi-finals
(Saudi Arabia) Al-Shabab	4	0	4
(South Korea) Seongnam Ihwa (a)	3	1	4
(Iran) Zob Ahan	1	1	2
(Saudi Arabia) Al-Hilal	0	0	0

Final
(South Korea) Seongnam Ilhwa Chunma	3
(Iran) Zob Ahan	1

== Round of 16 ==
The draw for the round of 16 of the 2010 AFC Champions League was held on 7 December 2009, along with the draw for the group stage.

=== West Asia ===
11 May 2010
19:20 (UTC+3)

Al-Gharafa (Qatar)	1–0	(Uzbekistan) Pakhtakor
Araújo 86' (pen.)	Report

Al-Gharafa Stadium, Al Rayyan
Attendance: 7,283
Referee: Mohsen Basma (Syria)

11 May 2010
20:45 (UTC+3)

Al-Shabab (Saudi Arabia)	3–2	(Iran) Esteghlal
Bin Sultan 22'; El Taib 47'; Al-Gizani 88'	Report	Akbarpour 24' (pen.); Kazemi 31'

King Fahd International Stadium, Riyadh
Attendance: 6,853
Referee: Masaaki Toma (Japan)

12 May 2010
19:00 (UTC+4:30)

Zob Ahan (Iran)	1–0	(Iran) Mes Kerman
Igor 85'	Report

Foolad Shahr Stadium, Isfahan
Attendance: 6,700
Referee: Choi Myung-Yong (Korea Republic)

12 May 2010
20:45 (UTC+3)

Al-Hilal (Saudi Arabia)	3–0	(Uzbekistan) Bunyodkor
Al-Marshedi 9'; Wilhelmsson 57'; Neves 61'	Report

King Fahd International Stadium, Riyadh
Attendance: 52,129
Referee: Ben Williams (Australia)

=== East Asia ===
11 May 2010
19:30 (UTC+9)

Seongnam Ilhwa Chunma (South Korea)	3–0	(Japan) Gamba Osaka
Molina 74' (pen.), 90'; Song Ho-Young 84'	Report

Tancheon Sports Complex, Seongnam
Attendance: 9,368
Referee: Abdullah Al-Hilali (Oman)

11 May 2010
19:30 (UTC+9)

Suwon Samsung Bluewings (South Korea)	2–0	(China) Beijing Guoan
José Mota 27', 86'	Report

Suwon World Cup Stadium, Suwon
Attendance: 5,693
Referee: Ali Hamad Al-Badwawi (UAE)

12 May 2010
19:00 (UTC+9)

Kashima Antlers (Japan)	0–1	(South Korea) Pohang Steelers
	Report	Mota 29'

Kashima Soccer Stadium, Kashima
Attendance: 9,794
Referee: Valentin Kovalenko (Uzbekistan)

12 May 2010
19:30 (UTC+9:30)

Adelaide United (Australia)	2–3 (a.e.t.)	(South Korea) Jeonbuk Hyundai Motors
Cornthwaite 78' van Dijk 90+5'	Report	Eninho 38', 88'; Lee Dong-Gook 116'

Hindmarsh Stadium, Adelaide
Attendance: 12,015
Referee: Abdulrahman Abdou (Qatar)

== Quarter-finals ==
=== First leg ===
15 September 2010
19:00 (UTC+9)

Jeonbuk Hyundai Motors (South Korea)	0–2	(Saudi Arabia) Al-Shabab
	Report	Al Yamani 68'; Olivera 90'

Jeonju World Cup Stadium, Jeonju
Attendance: 6,784
Referee: Mohsen Torky (Iran)

15 September 2010
19:30 (UTC+9)

Seongnam Ilhwa Chunma (South Korea)	4–1	(South Korea) Suwon Samsung Bluewings
Radončić 8', 66'; Molina 33'; Yang Sang-Min 82' (o.g.)	Report	Yeom Ki-Hun 17'

Tancheon Sports Complex, Seongnam
Attendance: 7,462
Referee: Abdulrahman Abdou (Qatar)

15 September 2010
18:30 (UTC+4:30)

Zob Ahan (Iran)	2–1	(South Korea) Pohang Steelers
Igor 18'; Rajabzadeh 76' (pen.)	Report	Mota 56'

Foolad Shahr Stadium, Isfahan
Attendance: 9,156
Referee: Abdullah Al-Hilali (Oman)

15 September 2010
20:35 (UTC+3)

Al-Hilal (Saudi Arabia)	3–0	(Qatar) Al-Gharafa
Al-Shalhoub 13'; Al-Fraidi 59'; Al-Gizani 85'	Report

King Fahd International Stadium, Riyadh
Attendance: 53,241
Referee: Masaaki Toma (Japan)

=== Second leg ===
22 September 2010
19:30 (UTC+9)

Pohang Steelers (South Korea)	1–1	(Iran) Zob Ahan
Kim Jae-Sung 10'	Report	Khalatbari 80'

Steelyard Stadium, Pohang
Attendance: 8,617
Referee: Ben Williams (Australia)

Zob Ahan won 3–2 on aggregate.

22 September 2010
19:30 (UTC+9)

Suwon Samsung Bluewings (South Korea)	2–0	(South Korea) Seongnam Ilhwa Chunma
Yeom Ki-Hun 31'; Lee Sang-ho 58'	Report

Suwon World Cup Stadium, Suwon
Attendance: 13,076
Referee: Mohsen Basma (Syria)

Seongnam Ilhwa Chunma won 4–3 on aggregate.

22 September 2010
18:30 (UTC+3)

Al-Gharafa (Qatar)	4–2 (a.e.t.)	(Saudi Arabia) Al-Hilal
Al Zain 2'; Mahmoud 38', 102'; El Assas 41'	Report	Al-Qahtani 117'; Al-Mehyani 119'

Al-Gharafa Stadium, Al Rayyan
Attendance: 13,632
Referee: Abdul Malik Bashir (Singapore)

Al-Hilal won 5–4 on aggregate.

22 September 2010
20:15 (UTC+3)

Al-Shabab (Saudi Arabia)	0–1	(South Korea) Jeonbuk Hyundai Motors
	Report	Kim Ji-Woong 24'

King Fahd International Stadium, Riyadh
Attendance: 8,340
Referee: Valentin Kovalenko (Uzbekistan)

Al-Shabab won 2–1 on aggregate.

== Semi-finals ==
=== First leg ===
5 October 2010
20:00 (UTC+3)

Al-Shabab (Saudi Arabia)	4–3	(South Korea) Seongnam Ilhwa Chunma
Olivera 15', 83'; Nasser 56'; Fisal 89'	Report	Molina 4', 68'; Jo Jae-Cheol 26'

King Fahd International Stadium, Riyadh
Attendance: 9,507
Referee: Matthew Breeze (Australia)

6 October 2010
17:00 (UTC+3:30)

Zob Ahan (Iran)	1–0	(Saudi Arabia) Al-Hilal
Hadadifar 57'	Report

Foolad Shahr Stadium, Isfahan
Attendance: 9,811
Referee: Subkhiddin Mohd Salleh (Malaysia)

=== Second leg ===
20 October 2010
19:30 (UTC+9)

Seongnam Ilhwa Chunma (South Korea)	1–0	(Saudi Arabia) Al-Shabab
Cho Dong-Geon 31'	Report

Tancheon Sports Complex, Seongnam
Attendance: 10,996
Referee: Ali Hamad Al-Badwawi (UAE)

4–4 on aggregate. Seongnam Ilhwa Chunma won on away goals.

20 October 2010
20:00 (UTC+3)

Al-Hilal (Saudi Arabia)	0–1	(Iran) Zob Ahan
	Report	Igor 55'

King Fahd International Stadium, Riyadh
Attendance: 68,752
Referee: Ravshan Irmatov (Uzbekistan)

Zob Ahan won 2–0 on aggregate.

== Final ==
13 November 2010
19:00 (UTC+9)

Seongnam Ilhwa Chunma (South Korea)	3–1	(Iran) Zob Ahan
Saša 29'; Cho Byung-Kuk 53'; Kim Cheol-Ho 83'	Report	Khalatbari 67'

National Stadium, Tokyo
Attendance: 27,308
Referee: Yuichi Nishimura (Japan)
