= Subkhiddin Mohd Salleh =

Malaysian retired football referee (born 1966)

Subkhiddin Salleh
- Full name: Mohd Subkhiddin Bin Mohd Salleh
- Born: 17 November 1966 (age 59); Parit Buntar, Perak, Malaysia
- Other occupation: Teacher

Domestic
Years	League	Role
1995–2011	Super League Malaysia	Referee

International
Years	League	Role
2000–2011	FIFA listed	Referee
2008–2011	AFC Elite	Referee

Subkhiddin Mohd Salleh (born 17 November 1966) is a Malaysian retired football referee who currently resides in Parit Buntar. He has been refereeing in the Super League Malaysia since 1995. He has been a full international referee for FIFA since 2000. In 2008, Subkhiddin became an AFC Elite referee. He is the only referee in Malaysia to be an AFC Elite Referee

== Career ==
Subkhiddin first International game was a 2002 FIFA World Cup qualification match with Iraq playing Nepal. Subkhiddin booked 5 people and sent off a player.

He was selected as a referee for the 2007 FIFA Under-20 World Cup in Canada, where he refereed the group stage match between Panama and Argentina, the quarterfinal between Chile and Portugal, where he sent off three players. In the latter match, he was involved in a bizarre incident where Portuguese player Zéquinha took the red card out of his hand while he was sending off Mano, to the bemusement of spectators and sports commentators, which in turn led to the prompt sending-off of Zéquinha. He also blew the whistle at the match between Scotland and Costa Rica. On 31 January 2010, Subkhiddin refereed the 2010 AFC Champions League qualifying play-off match, SHB Đà Nẵng vs. Muangthong United at the Chi Lăng Stadium in Da Nang.

He was selected as the 4th official for the 2010 FIFA World Cup.

The Malaysian born referee was the first referee in the country to be selected to represent FIFA World Cup 2010. Subkhiddin also officiated at the 2011 AFC Asian Cup.

Subkhiddin officially retired in August 2011 and currently resides in Parit Buntar.

== Tournaments ==
- 2002 Tiger Cup
- Football at the 2004 Summer Olympics
- 2004 AFC Asian Cup
- 2005 FIFA U-17 World Championship
- 2006 FIFA Club World Cup
- 2007 FIFA U-20 World Cup
- 2008 AFF Suzuki Cup
- 2009 FIFA U-20 World Cup
- 2010 FIFA World Cup
- 2011 AFC Asian Cup

== Personal life ==
Subkhiddin currently resides at Parit Buntar, Perak. He is a local Teacher teaching at Nibong Tebal, Pulau Pinang. Subkhiddin also likes to play Bowling, Sepak takraw and watching WWE.
