= Mohammad Reza Khalatbari (footballer, born 1983) =

Iranian footballer

Mohammad-Reza Khalatbari
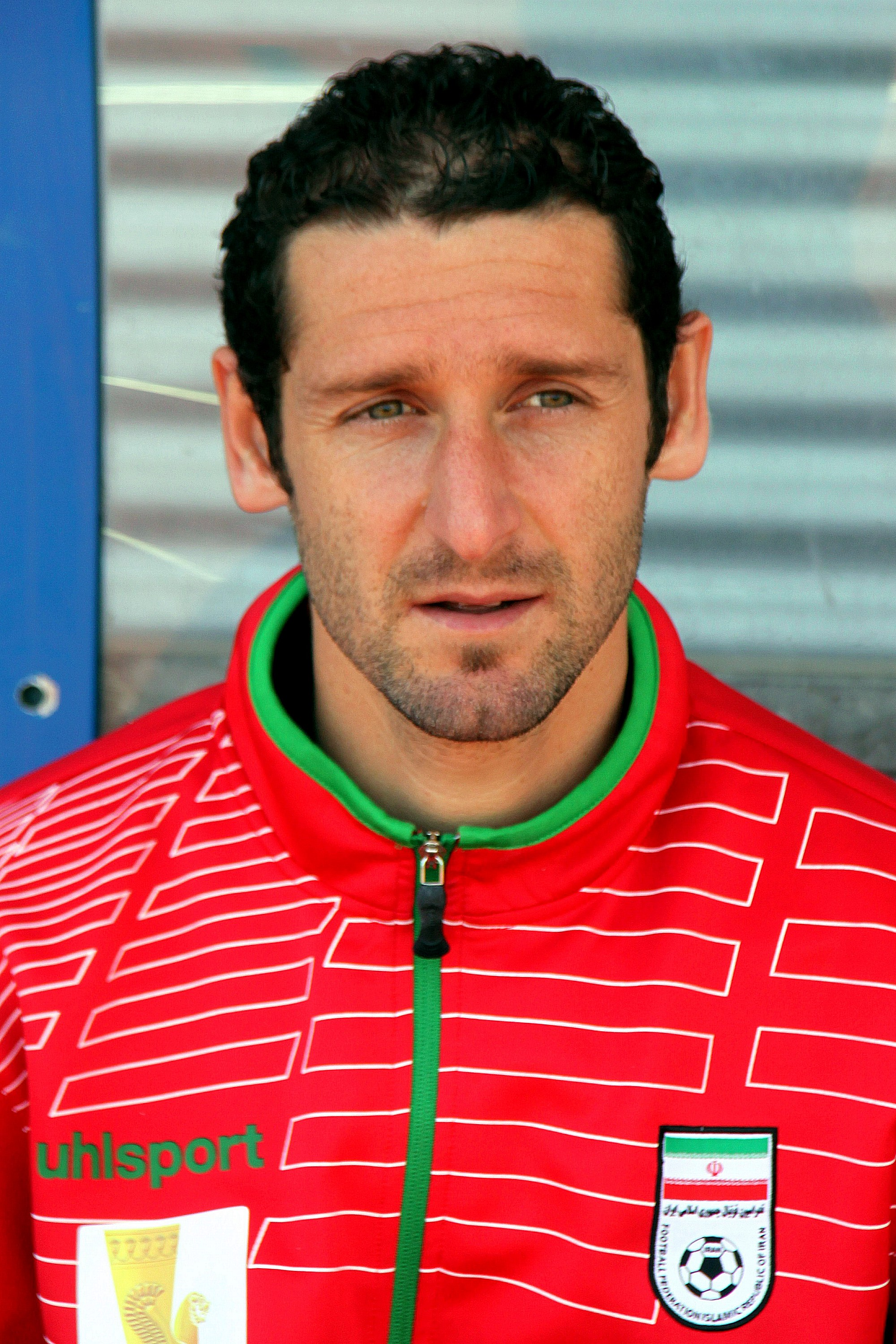
- Khalatbari with Iran in May 2014

Personal information
- Full name: Mohammad-Reza Khalatbari Limaki
- Date of birth: 14 September 1983 (age 43)
- Place of birth: Ramsar, Iran
- Height: 1.69 m (5 ft 7 in)
- Positions: Winger; forward

Youth career
- 2000–2003: Shamoushak

Senior career*
| Years | Team | Apps | (Gls) |
| 2003–2004 | Shamoushak | 14 | (1) |
| 2004–2006 | Aboomoslem | 51 | (3) |
| 2006–2011 | Zob Ahan | 126 | (35) |
| 2011–2012 | Al-Gharafa | 6 | (1) |
| 2012 | → Al Wasl (loan) | 10 | (3) |
| 2012–2013 | Sepahan | 32 | (13) |
| 2013 | Ajman | 0 | (0) |
| 2013–2014 | Persepolis | 22 | (6) |
| 2014–2016 | Sepahan | 51 | (13) |
| 2016–2017 | Gostaresh Foulad | 13 | (0) |
| 2017 | Saipa | 13 | (1) |
| 2017–2019 | Padideh | 39 | (3) |
| 2019–2020 | Zob Ahan | 11 | (1) |
| 2020 | Shahr Khodro | 10 | (1) |
| 2020–2022 | Sepahan | 33 | (1) |
| 2022–2023 | Foolad | 11 | (1) |
| 2023 | Aluminium Arak | 2 | (0) |

International career
| 2005–2015 | Iran | 60 | (5) |
- * Club domestic league appearances and goals

Mohammad Reza Khalatbari (Persian: محمدرضا خلعتبری; born 14 September 1983) is an Iranian former professional footballer. During his professional football career, he has played as an attacking midfielder, Winger and Forward in the Persian Gulf Pro League, UAE Pro League and Qatar Stars League. Khalatbari has scored 5 goals in 60 matches for the Iran national football team.

== Club career ==
=== Early years ===
Khalatbari began his career with Shamoushak's youth teams and joined Aboomoslem in the summer of 2004. He helped Aboumoslem reach the Hazfi Cup final where they lost to Saba Qom on penalties.

=== Zob Ahan ===
After two years with Aboumoslem, in July 2006, he signed for Zob Ahan, where he played important matches and led his team to win the Hazfi Cup in June 2009. During the summer of 2009, Khalatbari had a trial at 1. FC Köln, however the manager (Zvonimir Soldo) stated that Khalatbari was "lacking physical strength" and that "he might be a problem in Germany". He returned after his failed trial to become one of the most influential players in league and ACL in the 2009–10 season, where Zob Ahan reached the Champions League final for the first time in club history.

=== Al-Gharafa ===
He left Zob Ahan in June 2011 and signed a contract with Al-Gharafa. After an unsuccessful half-season at Al-Gharafa, Khalatbari left the club in the winter transfer window.

=== Al Ain F.C. ===
In early 2012, he was moved to Al Ain F.C.; a successful loan from Al Gharafa, he Scored 3 goals in 17 caps for Al Ain F.C.

=== Sepahan and Ajman ===
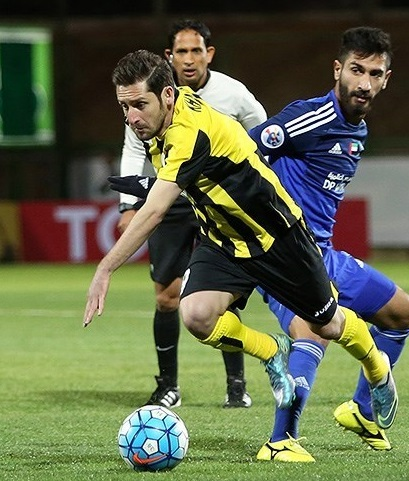
Khalatbari playing for Sepahan in an AFC Champions League match against Al-Nasr

On 10 July 2012, he joined Iranian champion Sepahan. He won the Hazfi Cup with Sepahan and became the league's top assistant player with 13 assists. He was also one of the league's top scorers with 14 league goals. Khalatbari had one of the best years in hs career with 17 goals in 45 appearances in all competitions. At the end of 2012–13 season, he moved to Ajman but the transfer was canceled after the renaming of UAE Pro League to UAE Arabian Gulf League.

=== Persepolis ===
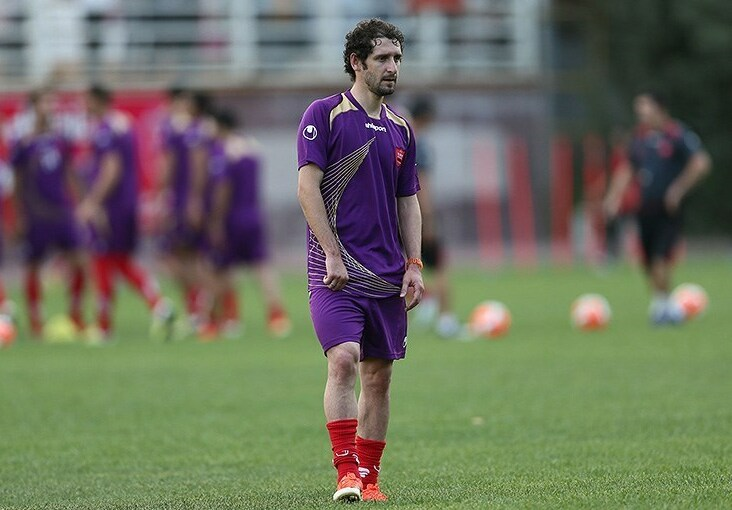
Khalatbari in Persepolis Training in September 2013

On 1 September 2013, Persepolis and Ajman reached an agreement with a fee around $800,000 and he joined Persepolis with a two-year contract. He made his debut in the Tehran derby match against Esteghlal. His first goal came when he scored a penalty kick in a match against Gostaresh Foulad. His six league goals helped Persepolis to a second-place league finish and a berth in the Asian Champions League. At the end of season, while he had financial problems with Persepolis, he paid one third of Ajman's debt (fee around $250,000) and skip his debts (fee around 3,400 million Rials). on 15 July 2014, Persepolis released him.

=== Return to Sepahan ===
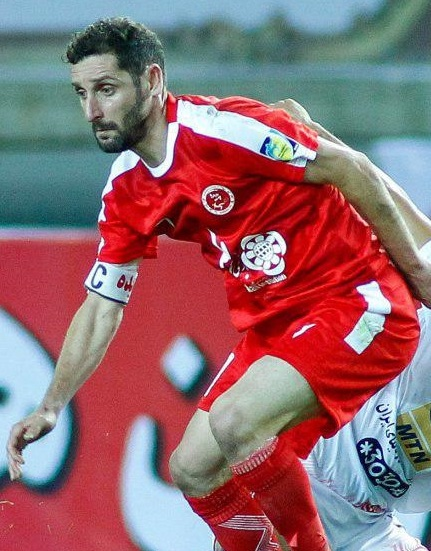
Khalatbari playing for Padideh in 2018

On 15 July 2014, Khalatbari returned to Sepahan, signing a two-year contract.

=== Club career statistics ===
As of 20 October 2018

| Club performance | | | League | | Cup | | Continental | | Total | |
| Season | Club | League | Apps | Goals | Apps | Goals | Apps | Goals | Apps | Goals |
| Iran | | | League | | Hazfi Cup | | Asia | | Total | |
|---|---|---|---|---|---|---|---|---|---|---|
| 2003–04 | Shamoushak | Iran Pro League | 14 | 1 | 0 | 0 | – | – | 14 | 1 |
| 2004–05 | Aboomoslem | Iran Pro League | 25 | 0 | 0 | 0 | – | – | 25 | 0 |
| 2005–06 | Aboomoslem | Iran Pro League | 26 | 3 | 0 | 0 | – | – | 26 | 3 |
| 2006–07 | Zob Ahan | Iran Pro League | 19 | 1 | 1 | 0 | – | – | 20 | 1 |
| 2007–08 | Zob Ahan | Iran Pro League | 25 | 7 | 2 | 0 | – | – | 27 | 7 |
| 2008–09 | Zob Ahan | Iran Pro League | 28 | 10 | 3 | 2 | – | – | 31 | 12 |
| 2009–10 | Zob Ahan | Iran Pro League | 26 | 11 | 4 | 1 | 11 | 5 | 40 | 17 |
| 2010–11 | Zob Ahan | Iran Pro League | 28 | 5 | 1 | 0 | 6 | 1 | 35 | 6 |
| Qatar | | | League | | Emir of Qatar Cup | | Asia | | Total | |
| 2011–12 | Al Gharrafa | Qatar Stars League | 8 | 2 | 1 | 1 | 0 | 0 | 9 | 3 |
| United Arab Emirates | | | League | | President's Cup | | Asia | | Total | |
| 2011–12 | Al Ain | UAE Pro-League | 16 | 2 | 1 | 1 | - | - | 17 | 3 |
| Iran | | | League | | Hazfi Cup | | Asia | | Total | |
| 2012–13 | Sepahan | Iran Pro League | 32 | 14 | 5 | 2 | 8 | 1 | 45 | 17 |
| 2013–14 | Persepolis | Iran Pro League | 21 | 6 | 2 | 0 | – | – | 21 | 6 |
| 2014–15 | Sepahan | Iran Pro League | 26 | 9 | 1 | 0 | – | – | 27 | 9 |
| 2015–16 | Sepahan | Iran Pro League | 9 | 1 | 1 | 1 | 6 | 0 | 16 | 2 |
| 2016–17 | Gostaresh | Iran Pro League | 20 | 2 | 0 | 0 | – | – | 20 | 2 |
| 2017 | Saipa | Iran Pro League | 13 | 1 | 0 | 0 | – | – | 13 | 1 |
| 2017–18 | Padideh | Iran Pro League | 7 | 1 | 0 | 0 | – | – | 7 | 1 |
| 2018–19 | Padideh | Iran Pro League | 15 | 2 | 2 | 0 | – | – | 17 | 2 |
| 2018–19 | Zob Ahan | Iran Pro League | 1 | 0 | 0 | 0 | – | – | 1 | 0 |
| 2019–20 | Zob Ahan | Iran Pro League | 2 | 1 | 0 | 0 | 0 | 0 | 2 | 1 |
| 2020 | Shahr Khodro | Iran Pro League | 14 | 1 | 1 | 0 | 2 | 0 | 17 | 2 |
| Total | Iran | | 351 | 78 | 20 | 6 | 35 | 7 | 406 | 88 |
| Total | Qatar | | 8 | 2 | 1 | 1 | 0 | 0 | 9 | 3 |
| Total | United Arab Emirates | | 10 | 3 | 4 | 1 | – | – | 14 | 4 |
| Career total | | | 369 | 83 | 25 | 8 | 35 | 7 | 429 | 98 |

- Assists

| Season | Team | Assists |
|---|---|---|
| 05–06 | Aboomoslem | 1 |
| 06–07 | Zob Ahan | 2 |
| 07–08 | Zob Ahan | 4 |
| 08–09 | Zob Ahan | 14 |
| 09–10 | Zob Ahan | 5 |
| 10–11 | Zob Ahan | 11 |
| 11–12 | Al Gharrafa | 4 |
| 11–12 | Al Ain | 2 |
| 12–13 | Sepahan | 13 |
| 13–14 | Persepolis | 5 |
| 14–15 | Sepahan | 3 |

== International career ==
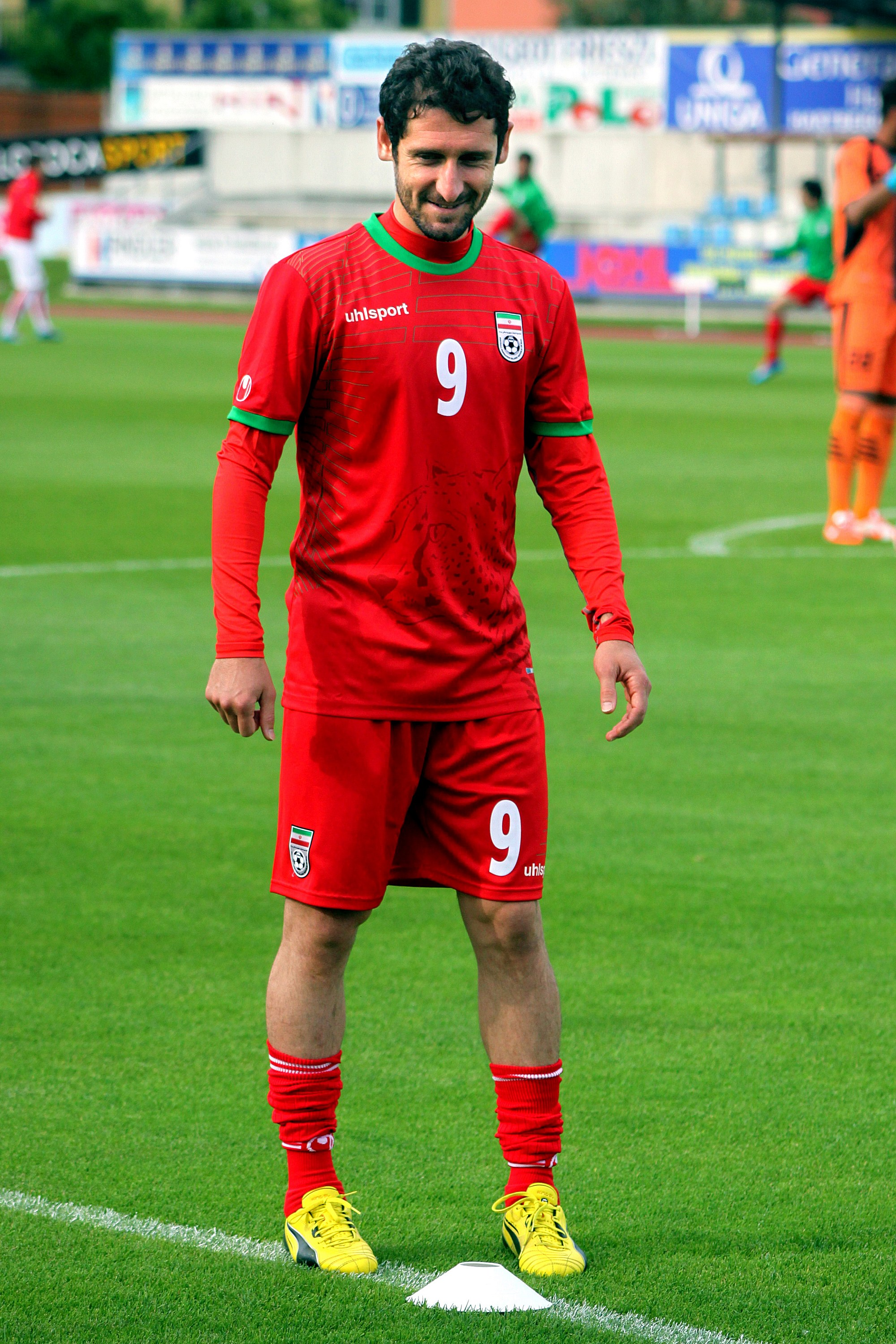
Khalatbari in training with Iran

Khalatbari plays as both winger and attacking midfielder for Iran. He's played in the WAFF Championships, 2010 World Cup qualifiers and 2011 Asian Cup qualifiers. He played an important role in securing Iran's spot in the 2014 FIFA World Cup under manager Carlos Queiroz. He was selected in Iran's 30-man provisional squad for the 2014 FIFA World Cup by Carlos Queiroz. However, Khalatbari did not make in the final 23-man squad.

=== International goals ===
Scores and results list Iran's goal tally first.

| # | Date | Venue | Opponent | Score | Result | Competition |
|---|---|---|---|---|---|---|
| 1. | 9 February 2011 | Al Dhafra Stadium, Madinat Zayed, United Arab Emirates | Russia | 1–0 | 1–0 | Friendly |
| 2. | 28 July 2011 | Galolhu National Stadium, Malé, Maldives | Maldives | 1–0 | 1–0 | 2014 FIFA World Cup qualification |
| 3. | 3 June 2012 | JAR Stadium, Tashkent, Uzbekistan | Uzbekistan | 1–0 | 1–0 | 2014 FIFA World Cup qualification |
| 4. | 15 August 2012 | Széktói Stadion, Kecskemét, Hungary | Tunisia | 2–2 | 2–2 | Friendly |
| 5. | 11 June 2013 | Azadi Stadium, Tehran, Iran | Lebanon | 1–0 | 4–0 | 2014 FIFA World Cup qualification |

== Attributes ==
Khalatbari is best known for his technical skill and fast pace on the ball, his vision, and his shooting capabilities.

== Honours ==
=== Club ===
Abomooslem

- Hazfi Cup: 2004–05 (Runner-up)

Zob Ahan

- AFC Champions League: 2010 (Runner-up)
- Iran Pro League: 2008–09 (Runner-up), 2009–10 (Runner-up)
- Hazfi Cup: 2008–09

Al Ain FC

- 2012–13 UAE Pro League UAE Pro League Winner

Sepahan

- Iran Pro League (1): 2014–15
- Hazfi Cup: 2012–13

Persepolis

- Iran Pro League: 2013–14 (Runner-up)

Foolad

- Iranian Super Cup: 2021

=== Country ===
- WAFF Championship: 2008

=== Individual ===
- Iran Pro League top goal assistant: 2008–09, 2012–13
